= 2004 IBF World Junior Championships – mixed doubles =

2004 IBF World Junior Championships mixed doubles
Tournament details
- Dates: 25 October 2004 – 30 October 2004
- Edition: 7th
- Level: International
- Venue: Minoru Arena
- Location: Richmond, Canada

The mixed doubles event for the 2004 IBF World Junior Championships was held between 25 October and 30 October. Yu Yang defended her title from the last edition, this time with her new partner He Hanbin.

== Seeded ==
1. (China) Shen Ye / Feng Chen (quarter-final)
2. (South Korea) Yoo Yeon-seong / Ha Jung-eun (quarter-final)
3. (South Korea) Lee Yong-dae / Park Soo-hee (semi-final)
4. (China) He Hanbin / Yu Yang (champion)
5. (China) Li Rui / Tian Qing (quarter-final)
6. (Chinese Taipei) Lee Sheng-mu / Cheng Shao-chieh (semi-final)
7. (Denmark) Rasmus Bonde / Christinna Pedersen (second round)
8. (Indonesia) Muhammad Rijal / Greysia Polii (final)

== Draw ==
=== Finals ===
Semifinals
5/8	(Indonesia) Muhammad Rijal (Indonesia) Greysia Polii	15	17
3/4	(South Korea) Lee Yong-dae (South Korea) Park Soo-hee	5	15
3/4	(China) He Hanbin (China) Yu Yang	15	15
5/8	(Chinese Taipei) Lee Sheng-mu (Chinese Taipei) Cheng Shao-chieh	3	1

Final
5/8	(Indonesia) Muhammad Rijal (Indonesia) Greysia Polii	12	12
3/4	(China) He Hanbin (China) Yu Yang	15	15

=== Top half ===
==== Section 1 ====
First round
1	(China) Shen Y (China) Feng C	15	15
(Nigeria) O Elewa (Nigeria) M Samuel	1	3
(Netherlands) S Afif (Netherlands) E Besselink	8	7
(Slovenia) I Utroša (Slovenia) U Silvester	15	15
(Czech Republic) T Kopřiva (Czech Republic) P Janošová	15	15
(Canada) A Pang (Canada) A Man	5	9
(Chinese Taipei) Fang C-m (Chinese Taipei) Tsai P-l	15	15
(Malaysia) Hoon TH (Malaysia) Haw CH	7	11
5/8	(Indonesia) M Rijal (Indonesia) G Polii	17	15
(England) R Ouseph (England) M Agathangelou	14	12
(Singapore) Koh YS (Singapore) V Neo	15	15
(Malaysia) Chong WF (Malaysia) A Raj Kaur	3	6
(Russia) K Khlestov (Russia) E Chernjavskaya	WO
(Canada) N Keifer (Canada) C Chee
(Hong Kong) Wong WH (Hong Kong) Yip PY	4	3
(Germany) J Schulz (Germany) A Lillie	15	15

Second round
1	(China) Shen Y (China) Feng C	15	15
(Slovenia) I Utroša (Slovenia) U Silvester	2	1
(Czech Republic) T Kopřiva (Czech Republic) P Janošová	9	7
(Chinese Taipei) Fang C-m (Chinese Taipei) Tsai P-l	15	15
5/8	(Indonesia) M Rijal (Indonesia) G Polii	15	15
(Singapore) Koh YS (Singapore) V Neo	7	9
(Canada) N Keifer (Canada) C Chee	1	5
(Germany) J Schulz (Germany) A Lillie	15	15

Third round
1	(China) Shen Y (China) Feng C	15	17
(Chinese Taipei) Fang C-m (Chinese Taipei) Tsai P-l	5	14
5/8	(Indonesia) M Rijal (Indonesia) G Polii	15	15
(Germany) J Schulz (Germany) A Lillie	6	7

Quarter finals
1	(China) Shen Y (China) Feng C	10	12
5/8	(Indonesia) M Rijal (Indonesia) G Polii	15	15

==== Section 2 ====
First round
3/4	(South Korea) Lee Y-d (South Korea) Park S-h	15	15
(Sweden) M Wigardt (Sweden) S Jonsson	6	5
(Russia) V Ivanov (Russia) O Kozlova	15	15
(Slovenia) N Boljka (Slovenia) A Kovač	6	5
(Japan) M Nasuka (Japan) M Sekiya	15	15
(Peru) M del Valle (Peru) C Aicardi	4	4
(China) Cao L (China) Pan P	15	15
(Sweden) R Eidestedt (Sweden) E Wengberg	6	8
5/8	(Denmark) R Bonde (Denmark) C Pedersen	15	15
(Peru) S Salazar (Peru) A Monteverde	5	5
(Japan) M Takeuchi (Japan) K Mizuma	8	5
(Chinese Taipei) Chen H-l (Chinese Taipei) Hsieh P-c	15	15
(South Korea) Jung J-y (South Korea) Oh S-k	15	15
(Croatia) N Rihtar (Croatia) M Savor	2	4
(United States) D Lim (United States) L Todt	4	3
(Germany) D Nyenhuis (Germany) J Goliszewski	15	15

Second round
3/4	(South Korea) Lee Y-d (South Korea) Park S-h	15	15
(Russia) V Ivanov (Russia) O Kozlova	4	6
(Japan) M Nasuka (Japan) M Sekiya	0	0
(China) Cao L (China) Pan P	15	15
5/8	(Denmark) R Bonde (Denmark) C Pedersen	11	7
(Chinese Taipei) Chen H-l (Chinese Taipei) Hsieh P-c	15	15
(South Korea) Jung J-y (South Korea) Oh S-k	15	15
(Germany) D Nyenhuis (Germany) J Goliszewski	9	3

Third round
3/4	(South Korea) Lee Y-d (South Korea) Park S-h	10	15	15
(China) Cao L (China) Pan P	15	12	7
(Chinese Taipei) Chen H-l (Chinese Taipei) Hsieh P-c	17	15
(South Korea) Jung J-y (South Korea) Oh S-k	14	13

Quarter finals
3/4	(South Korea) Lee Y-d (South Korea) Park S-h	15	15
(Chinese Taipei) Chen H-l (Chinese Taipei) Hsieh P-c	11	3

=== Bottom half ===
==== Section 3 ====
First round
(Japan) J Tamura (Japan) Y Kimura	16	17	15
(Canada) B Dejong (Canada) S Ralph	17	14	7
(Netherlands) J de Ruiter (Netherlands) I Vaessen	9	2
(Czech Republic) P Florián (Czech Republic) K Ludíková	15	15
(South Korea) Jeon J-b (South Korea) Park S-r	12	4
(Denmark) K Henriksen (Denmark) T Kruse	15	15
(Hong Kong) Leung CY (Hong Kong) Chan TK	1	7
5/8	(China) Li R (China) Tian Q	15	15
(Indonesia) I Agung (Indonesia) H Budiman	13	15	15
(Netherlands) L Oey (Netherlands) P Stolzenbach	15	9	5
(United States) T Blanchet (United States) T Kimura	11	10
(Hong Kong) Lau CY (Hong Kong) Mong KY	15	15
(Peru) A de Vinatea (Peru) C Rivero	8	5
(Malaysia) KK Ananthakrishnan (Malaysia) A Anscelly	15	15
(England) T Dunlop (England) H Olver	0	3
3/4	(China) He HB (China) Yu Y	15	15

Second round
(Japan) J Tamura (Japan) Y Kimura	7	4
(Czech Republic) P Florián (Czech Republic) K Ludíková	15	15
(Denmark) K Henriksen (Denmark) T Kruse	12	8
5/8	(China) Li R (China) Tian Q	15	15
(Indonesia) I Agung (Indonesia) H Budiman	15	15
(Hong Kong) Lau CY (Hong Kong) Mong KY	1	2
(Malaysia) KK Ananthakrishnan (Malaysia) A Anscelly	0	4
3/4	(China) He HB (China) Yu Y	15	15

Third round
(Czech Republic) P Florián (Czech Republic) K Ludíková	0	4
5/8	(China) Li R (China) Tian Q	15	15
(Indonesia) I Agung (Indonesia) H Budiman	2	2
3/4	(China) He HB (China) Yu Y	15	15

Quarter finals
5/8	(China) Li R (China) Tian Q	10	9
3/4	(China) He HB (China) Yu Y	15	15

==== Section 4 ====
First round
(Nigeria) A Otagada (Nigeria) M Gideon	3	4
(Germany) D Domke (Germany) M Reich	15	15
(Russia) M Danchenko (Russia) A Kudinova	15	15
(Slovenia) R Cinc (Slovenia) Š Silvester	13	4
(Japan) K Oshima (Japan) Y Oku	15	12	15
(Chinese Taipei) Yeh C-h (Chinese Taipei) Chang Y-l	13	15	13
(Germany) T Zander (Germany) J Köhler	2	4
5/8	(Chinese Taipei) Lee S-m (Chinese Taipei) Cheng S-c	15	15
(Estonia) R Must (Estonia) S Kamilova	4	2
(England) R Adcock (England) J Wallwork	15	15
(Hong Kong) Hui WH (Hong Kong) Lam SY	14	15	15
(Canada) R Liang (Canada) C Chau	17	5	6
(Singapore) A Latib (Singapore) Tan WQ	3	9
(Russia) V Malkov (Russia) N Vislova	15	15
(Sweden) H Hurskainen (Sweden) E Lennartsson	WO
2	(South Korea) Yoo Y-s (South Korea) Ha J-e

Second round
(Germany) D Domke (Germany) M Reich	3	15	8
(Russia) M Danchenko (Russia) A Kudinova	15	13	15
(Japan) K Oshima (Japan) Y Oku	5	3
5/8	(Chinese Taipei) Lee S-m (Chinese Taipei) Cheng S-c	15	15
(England) R Adcock (England) J Wallwork	15	15
(Hong Kong) Hui WH (Hong Kong) Lam SY	1	7
(Russia) V Malkov (Russia) N Vislova	8	7
2	(South Korea) Yoo Y-s (South Korea) Ha J-e	15	15

Third round
(Russia) M Danchenko (Russia) A Kudinova	10	7
5/8	(Chinese Taipei) Lee S-m (Chinese Taipei) Cheng S-c	15	15
(England) R Adcock (England) J Wallwork	7	6
2	(South Korea) Yoo Y-s (South Korea) Ha J-e	15	15

Quarter finals
5/8	(Chinese Taipei) Lee S-m (Chinese Taipei) Cheng S-c	11	15	15
2	(South Korea) Yoo Y-s (South Korea) Ha J-e	15	12	9
