= 2010 BWF World Championships – Women's doubles =

Badminton championships

Women's doubles at the 2010 BWF World Championships
- Venue: Stade Pierre de Coubertin
- Location: Paris, France
- Dates: August 23, 2010 – August 29, 2010

Medalists
gold medal	Du Jing; Yu Yang	China
silver medal	Ma Jin; Wang Xiaoli	China
bronze medal	Cheng Shu; Zhao Yunlei	China
bronze medal	Cheng Wen-hsing; Chien Yu-chin	Chinese Taipei

The 2010 BWF World Championships was the 18th tournament of the World Badminton Championships. It was held at Stade Pierre de Coubertin in Paris, France, from August 23 to August 29, 2010. Following the results of the women's doubles.

== Seeds ==
1. (China) Ma Jin / Wang Xiaoli (finalists)
2. (China) Du Jing / Yu Yang (champions)
3. (Chinese Taipei) Cheng Wen-hsing / Chien Yu-chin (semifinals)
4. (China) Cheng Shu / Zhao Yunlei (semifinals)
5. (Japan) Miyuki Maeda / Satoko Suetsuna (quarterfinals)
6. (South Korea) Ha Jung-eun / Kim Min-jung (quarterfinals)
7. (China) Pan Pan / Tian Qing (quarterfinals)
8. (South Korea) Yoo Hyun-young / Jung Kyung-eun (quarterfinals)
9. (Japan) Mizuki Fujii / Reika Kakiiwa (second round, retired)
10. (Bulgaria) Petya Nedelcheva / (Russia) Anastasia Russkikh (third round)
11. (Singapore) Shinta Mulia Sari / Yao Lei (third round)
12. (Russia) Valeria Sorokina / Nina Vislova (third round)
13. (Thailand) Savitree Amitrapai / Vacharaporn Munkit (first round)
14. (Thailand) Duanganong Aroonkesorn / Kunchala Voravichitchaikul (third round)
15. (Japan) Shizuka Matsuo / Mami Naito (third round)
16. (India) Jwala Gutta / Ashwini Ponnappa (third round)

== Main stage ==
=== Section 1 ===
First round
(Australia) L Cooper (Australia) A-L Slee	21	21
(Nigeria) S Ideh (Nigeria) M Braimoh	11	13
16	(India) J Gutta (India) A Ponnappa
(Netherlands) S Barning (Netherlands) E Muskens	wo
(South Africa) M Edwards (South Africa) A Viljoen	13	6
(Ukraine) M Ulitina (Ukraine) N Voytsekh	21	21

Second round
1	(China) Ma J (China) Wang XL	21	21
(United States) I Wang (United States) R Wang	7	7
11	(Singapore) SM Sari (Singapore) Yao L	21	21
(Australia) L Cooper (Australia) A-L Slee	10	7
6	(South Korea) Ha J-e (South Korea) Kim M-j	21	21
(Switzerland) M Gruber (Switzerland) S Jaquet	2	5
16	(India) J Gutta (India) A Ponnappa	21	21
(Ukraine) M Ulitina (Ukraine) N Voytsekh	8	10

Third round
1	(China) Ma J (China) Wang XL	21	21
11	(Singapore) SM Sari (Singapore) Yao L	9	14
6	(South Korea) Ha J-e (South Korea) Kim M-j	21	21
16	(India) J Gutta (India) A Ponnappa	14	15

Quarterfinals
1	(China) Ma J (China) Wang XL	21	17	21
6	(South Korea) Ha J-e (South Korea) Kim M-j	19	21	12

=== Section 2 ===
First round
14	(Thailand) D Aroonkesorn (Thailand) K Voravichitchaikul	21	21
(Greece) I Karkantzia (Greece) T Ligomenou	6	9
(Germany) S Marinello (Germany) B Overzier	22	21
(Denmark) L Damkjaer Kruse (Denmark) M Schjott-Kristensen	20	19
10	(Bulgaria) P Nedelcheva (Russia) A Russkikh	21	21
(France) L Choinet (France) W Rasidi	7	16
(England) J Wallwork (England) G White	21	21
(Canada) M Cloutier (Canada) V St. Jacques	3	14

Second round
4	(China) Cheng S (China) Zhao YL
(Chinese Taipei) Chang H-y (Chinese Taipei) Chou C-c	wo
14	(Thailand) D Aroonkesorn (Thailand) K Voravichitchaikul	21	21
(Germany) S Marinello (Germany) B Overzier	15	17
5	(Japan) M Maeda (Japan) S Suetsuna	21	21
(Spain) L Molina (Spain) H Ojeda	7	7
10	(Bulgaria) P Nedelcheva (Russia) A Russkikh	21	21
(England) J Wallwork (England) G White	16	16

Third round
4	(China) Cheng S (China) Zhao YL	21	21
14	(Thailand) D Aroonkesorn (Thailand) K Voravichitchaikul	13	11
5	(Japan) M Maeda (Japan) S Suetsuna	21	21
10	(Bulgaria) P Nedelcheva (Russia) A Russkikh	12	15

Quarterfinals
4	(China) Cheng S (China) Zhao YL	21	21
5	(Japan) M Maeda (Japan) S Suetsuna	8	14

=== Section 3 ===
First round
(France) E Chanteur (France) B Matias
(Czech Republic) A Bášová (Czech Republic) S Krizkova	wo
(Ukraine) A Kobtseva (Ukraine) E Prus	16	5
12	(Russia) V Sorokina (Russia) N Vislova	21	21
(Denmark) L Frier Kristiansen (Denmark) M Roepke	wo
(Netherlands) L Jonathans (Netherlands) P van Dooremalen
(Scotland) I Bankier (Scotland) E Mason	21	15	21
13	(Thailand) S Amitrapai (Thailand) V Munkit	17	21	15

Second round
(France) E Chanteur (France) B Matias	8	7
12	(Russia) V Sorokina (Russia) N Vislova	21	21
(Canada) G Gao (Canada) J Ko	10	0^{r}
8	(South Korea) Yoo H-y (South Korea) Jung K-e	21	0
(Netherlands) L Jonathans (Netherlands) P van Dooremalen	21	21
(Scotland) I Bankier (Scotland) E Mason	17	13
(Hong Kong) Chan TK (Hong Kong) Chau HW	5	9
3	(Chinese Taipei) Cheng W-h (Chinese Taipei) Chien Y-c	21	21

Third round
12	(Russia) V Sorokina (Russia) N Vislova	21	19	24
8	' (South Korea) Yoo H-y (South Korea) Jung K-e	13	21	26
3	(Netherlands) L Jonathans (Netherlands) P van Dooremalen	14	15
3	(Chinese Taipei) Cheng W-h (Chinese Taipei) Chien Y-c	21	21

Quarterfinals
8	(South Korea) Yoo H-y (South Korea) Jung K-e	14	17
3	(Chinese Taipei) Cheng W-h (Chinese Taipei) Chien Y-c	21	21

=== Section 4 ===
First round
(Australia) Tang HT (Australia) R Veeran	21	21
(Sweden) E Wengberg (Sweden) E Lennartsson	11	14
(United States) Ra Yeh (United States) Re Yeh	8	10
9	(Japan) M Fujii (Japan) R Kakiiwa	8	10
(Belgium) S Annys (Belgium) S Corvilain	15	21	11
(Finland) S Rautala (Finland) N Virta	21	19	21
(Poland) N Pocztowiak (Poland) A Wojtkowska	11	6
15	(Japan) S Matsuo (Japan) M Naito	21	21

Second round
(Australia) Tang HT (Australia) R Veeran	13	8
9	(Japan) M Fujii (Japan) R Kakiiwa	21	21
(South Korea) Lee H-j (South Korea) Lee K-w	wo
7	(China) Pan P (China) Tian Q
(Finland) S Rautala (Finland) N Virta	0	8
15	(Japan) S Matsuo (Japan) M Naito	21	21
(France) A Fontaine (France) M Luttmann	12	8
2	(China) Du J (China) Yu Y	21	21

Third round
9	(Japan) M Fujii (Japan) R Kakiiwa	18	9
7	(China) Pan P (China) Tian Q	21	21
15	(Japan) S Matsuo (Japan) M Naito	10	10
2	(China) Du J (China) Yu Y	21	21

Quarterfinals
7	(China) Pan P (China) Tian Q	20	18
2	(China) Du J (China) Yu Y	22	21

== Final stage ==
Quarterfinals
1	(China) Ma Jin (China) Wang Xiaoli	21	17	21
6	(South Korea) Ha Jung-eun (South Korea) Kim Min-jung	19	21	12
4	(China) Cheng Shu (China) Zhao Yunlei	21	21
5	(Japan) Miyuki Maeda (Japan) Satoko Suetsuna	8	14
8	(South Korea) Yoo Hyun-young (South Korea) Jung Kyung-eun	14	17
3	(Chinese Taipei) Cheng Wen-hsing (Chinese Taipei) Chien Yu-chin	21	21
7	(China) Pan Pan (China) Tian Qing	20	18
2	(China) Du Jing (China) Yu Yang	22	21

Semifinals
1	(China) Ma Jin (China) Wang Xiaoli	10	21	21
4	(China) Cheng Shu (China) Zhao Yunlei	21	10	13
3	(Chinese Taipei) Cheng Wen-hsing (Chinese Taipei) Chien Yu-chin	16	15
2	(China) Du Jing (China) Yu Yang	21	21

Finals
1	(China) Ma Jin (China) Wang Xiaoli	9	17
2	(China) Du Jing (China) Yu Yang	21	21
