= 2011 BWF World Championships – Women's doubles =

Badminton championships

Women's doubles at the 2011 BWF World Championships
- Venue: Wembley Arena
- Location: London, England
- Dates: August 8, 2011 – August 14, 2011

Medalists
gold medal	Wang Xiaoli; Yu Yang	China
silver medal	Tian Qing; Zhao Yunlei	China
bronze medal	Miyuki Maeda; Satoko Suetsuna	Japan
bronze medal	Jwala Gutta; Ashwini Ponnappa	India

The women's doubles tournament of the 2011 BWF World Championships (World Badminton Championships) was held from August 8 to 14. Du Jing and Yu Yang were the defending champions.
Wang Xiaoli and Yu Yang defeated Tian Qing and Zhao Yunlei 22–20, 21–11 in the final to win their first gold medals at the World Championships.

== Seeds ==
1. (China) Wang Xiaoli / Yu Yang (champions)
2. (Chinese Taipei) Cheng Wen-hsing / Chien Yu-chin (second round)
3. (Japan) Miyuki Maeda / Satoko Suetsuna (semifinals)
4. (Japan) Mizuki Fujii / Reika Kakiiwa (quarterfinals)
5. (China) Tian Qing / Zhao Yunlei (final)
6. (South Korea) Ha Jung-eun / Kim Min-jung (second round, retired)
7. (Japan) Shizuka Matsuo / Mami Naito (quarterfinals)
8. (Indonesia) Meiliana Jauhari / Greysia Polii (quarterfinals)
9. (Thailand) Duanganong Aroonkesorn / Kunchala Voravichitchaikul (third round)
10. (Russia) Valeria Sorokina / Nina Vislova (third round)
11. (Hong Kong) Poon Lok Yan / Tse Ying Suet (third round)
12. (Indonesia) Vita Marissa / Nadya Melati (quarterfinals)
13. (Netherlands) Lotte Jonathans / Paulien van Dooremalen (second round)
14. (Denmark) Christinna Pedersen / Kamilla Rytter Juhl (third round)
15. (Japan) Misaki Matsutomo / Ayaka Takahashi (third round)
16. (Singapore) Shinta Mulia Sari / Yao Lei (third round)

== Draw ==
=== Finals ===
Quarterfinals
1	(China) Wang Xiaoli (China) Yu Yang	21	21
7	(Japan) Shizuka Matsuo (Japan) Mami Naito	13	12
3	(Japan) Miyuki Maeda (Japan) Satoko Suetsuna	21	21
8	(Indonesia) Meiliana Jauhari (Indonesia) Greysia Polii	15	17
5	(China) Tian Qing (China) Zhao Yunlei	21	21
4	(Japan) Mizuki Fujii (Japan) Reika Kakiiwa	16	10
12	(Indonesia) Vita Marissa (Indonesia) Nadya Melati	21	10	17
(India) Jwala Gutta (India) Ashwini Ponnappa	17	21	21

Semifinals
1	(China) Wang Xiaoli (China) Yu Yang	21	21
3	(Japan) Miyuki Maeda (Japan) Satoko Suetsuna	8	15
5	(China) Tian Qing (China) Zhao Yunlei	21	21
(India) Jwala Gutta (India) Ashwini Ponnappa	14	16

Final
1	(China) Wang Xiaoli (China) Yu Yang	22	21
5	(China) Tian Qing (China) Zhao Yunlei	20	11

=== Section 1 ===
First Round
(Chinese Taipei) Hsieh P-c (Chinese Taipei) Wang P-r	14	17
(Germany) S Marinello (Germany) B Michels	21	21
(Denmark) L Damkjær Kruse (Denmark) M Roepke	21	21
(Mexico) C Gonzalez (Mexico) V Montero	12	10
(Hong Kong) Chan TK (Hong Kong) Chau HW	17	21	21
(England) M Agathangelou (England) H Olver	21	12	15

Second Round
1	(China) Wang XL (China) Yu Y	21	21
(Sweden) E Lennartsson (Sweden) E Wengberg	14	8
9	(Thailand) D Aroonkesorn (Thailand) K Voravichitchaikul	21	21
(Germany) S Marinello (Germany) B Michels	12	15
7	(Japan) S Matsuo (Japan) M Naito	21	21
(Denmark) L Damkjær Kruse (Denmark) M Roepke	10	18
13	(Netherlands) L Jonathans (Netherlands) P van Dooremalen	14	10
(Hong Kong) Chan TK (Hong Kong) Chau HW	21	21

Third Round
1	(China) Wang XL (China) Yu Y	21	21
9	(Thailand) D Aroonkesorn (Thailand) K Voravichitchaikul	13	19
7	(Japan) S Matsuo (Japan) M Naito	21	21
(Hong Kong) Chan TK (Hong Kong) Chau HW	6	16

Quarterfinals
1	(China) Wang XL (China) Yu Y	21	21
7	(Japan) S Matsuo (Japan) M Naito	13	12

=== Section 2 ===
First Round
(Canada) G Gao (Canada) J Ko	18	17
(Indonesia) DD Haris (Indonesia) SR Andini	21	21
(Malaysia) Ng HE (Malaysia) Ng HL	21	22
(Ukraine) A Kobceva (Ukraine) E Prus	14	20
(Russia) A Chervaykova (Russia) M Korobeyinkova	21	16	15
(Turkey) N Kilic (Turkey) N Yigit	17	21	21
(United States) I Wang (United States) R Wang	21	21
(Belgium) J Elst (Belgium) J Snoeck	6	11

Second Round
3	(Japan) M Maeda (Japan) S Suetsuna	21	21
(Indonesia) DD Haris (Indonesia) SR Andini	14	15
15	(Japan) M Matsutomo (Japan) A Takahashi	21	21
(Malaysia) Ng HE (Malaysia) Ng HL	10	11
8	(Indonesia) M Jauhari (Indonesia) G Polii	21	21
(Turkey) N Kilic (Turkey) N Yigit	8	8
16	(Singapore) SM Sari (Singapore) Y Lei	21	21
(United States) I Wang (United States) R Wang	11	17

Third Round
3	(Japan) M Maeda (Japan) S Suetsuna	18	21	21
15	(Japan) M Matsutomo (Japan) A Takahashi	21	15	17
8	(Indonesia) M Jauhari (Indonesia) G Polii	21	21
16	(Singapore) SM Sari (Singapore) Y Lei	13	13

Quarterfinals
3	(Japan) M Maeda (Japan) S Suetsuna	21	21
8	(Indonesia) M Jauhari (Indonesia) G Polii	15	17

=== Section 3 ===
First Round
(South Africa) MC Edwards (South Africa) A Viljoen	12	19
(Sweden) L Eriksson (Sweden) A Wallin	21	21
(Turkey) Ö Bayrak (Turkey) C Fere	10	11
(Sri Lanka) A Mudiyanselage (Sri Lanka) U Weerasinghe	21	21
(Belgium) S Annys (Belgium) S Corvilain	6	9
(Australia) L Choo (Australia) R Veeran	21	21
(Malaysia) Chin EH (Malaysia) Wong PT	21	21
(England) J Wallwork (England) G White	14	12

Second Round
(Sweden) L Eriksson (Sweden) A Wallin	15	12
14	(Denmark) C Pedersen (Denmark) K Rytter Juhl	21	21
(Sri Lanka) A Mudiyanselage (Sri Lanka) U Weerasinghe	13	5
5	(China) Tian Q (China) Zhao YL	21	21
(Australia) L Choo (Australia) R Veeran	22	11	5
10	(Russia) V Sorokina (Russia) N Vislova	20	21	21
(Malaysia) Chin EH (Malaysia) Wong PT	16	24	20
4	(Japan) M Fujii (Japan) R Kakiiwa	21	22	22

Third Round
14	(Denmark) C Pedersen (Denmark) K Rytter Juhl	20	16
5	(China) Tian Q (China) Zhao YL	22	21
10	(Russia) V Sorokina (Russia) N Vislova	12	21	14
4	(Japan) M Fujii (Japan) R Kakiiwa	21	18	21

Quarterfinals
5	(China) Tian Q (China) Zhao YL	21	21
4	(Japan) M Fujii (Japan) R Kakiiwa	16	10

=== Section 4 ===
First Round
(Germany) J Goliszewski (Germany) C Nelte	15	21	21
(Ukraine) M Ulitina (Ukraine) N Voytsekh	21	9	10
(Canada) A Bruce (Canada) M Li	21	17	13
(Netherlands) S Piek (Netherlands) I Tabeling	12	21	21
(England) A Langley (England) L Smith	21	21
(Spain) N Jiménez (Spain) P Rodríguez	9	15
(United States) E Lee (United States) PL Obañana	9	18
(India) J Gutta (India) A Ponnappa	21	21

Second Round
(Germany) J Goliszewski (Germany) C Nelte	18	18
12	(Indonesia) V Marissa (Indonesia) N Melati	21	21
(Netherlands) S Piek (Netherlands) I Tabeling
6	(South Korea) Ha J-e (South Korea) Kim M-j	wo
(England) A Langley (England) L Smith	10	20
11	(Hong Kong) Poon LY (Hong Kong) Tse YS	21	22
(India) J Gutta (India) A Ponnappa	21	21
2	(Chinese Taipei) Cheng W-h (Chinese Taipei) Chien Y-c	18	18

Third Round
12	(Indonesia) V Marissa (Indonesia) N Melati	21	21
(Netherlands) S Piek (Netherlands) I Tabeling	11	10
11	(Hong Kong) Poon LY (Hong Kong) Tse YS	21	17	19
(India) J Gutta (India) A Ponnappa	19	21	21

Quarterfinals
12	(Indonesia) V Marissa (Indonesia) N Melati	21	10	17
(India) J Gutta (India) A Ponnappa	17	21	21
