= Oh Seul-ki =

South Korean badminton player (born 1987)

Personal information
- Born: 20 August 1987 (age 39)

Sport
- Country: South Korea
- Sport: Badminton
- Event: Women's & mixed doubles

Women's & mixed doubles
- BWF profile
Medal record
Women's badminton
Representing South Korea
World Junior Championships
Silver medal – second place	2004 Richmond	Mixed team
Bronze medal – third place	2004 Richmond	Girls' doubles
Asian Junior Championships
Silver medal – second place	2004 Hwacheon	Girls' team
Bronze medal – third place	2004 Hwacheon	Girls' doubles

Oh Seul-ki (Korean: 오슬기; born 20 August 1987) is a South Korean badminton player. She was the girls' doubles bronze medallists at the 2004 Asian and World Junior Championships partnered with Ha Jung-eun, also claimed the silver medal in the Asian girls' team and World mixed team. Oh who was educated at the Jeonju Sungsim Girls' high school was the champion at the 2003 Indonesia Junior tournament. She won her first international title at the 2003 Norwegian International tournament in the women's doubles event. She then claimed doubles title at the 2005 Vietnam Satellite tournament by winning the women's and mixed doubles event. Oh then affiliated with the Yeongdong team became the runner-up at the 2012 Korean National Badminton Championships in the mixed doubles event with Jeon Jun-bum.

== Achievements ==
=== World Junior Championships ===
Girls' doubles
Year	Venue	Partner	Opponent	Score	Result
2004	Minoru Arena; Richmond, Canada	(South Korea) Ha Jung-eun	(China) Feng Chen (China) Pan Pan	10–15, 9–15	Bronze

=== Asian Junior Championships ===
Girls' doubles
Year	Venue	Partner	Opponent	Score	Result
2004	Hwacheon Indoor Stadium; Hwacheon, South Korea	(South Korea) Ha Jung-eun	(China) Ding Jiao (China) Zhao Yunlei	6–15, 12–15	Bronze

=== BWF International Challenge/Series ===
Women's doubles
Year	Tournament	Partner	Opponent	Score	Result
2007	Canadian International	(South Korea) Joo Hyun-hee	(South Korea) Hwang Yu-mi (South Korea) Ha Jung-eun	16–21, 7–21	(silver) Runner-up
2006	Vietnam Satellite	(South Korea) Kim Min-jung	(Thailand) Duanganong Aroonkesorn (Thailand) Kunchala Voravichitchaikul	23–21, 12–21, 21–9	(gold) Winner
2005	Canadian International	(South Korea) Ha Jung-eun	(South Korea) Jun Woul-sik (South Korea) Ra Kyung-min	5–15, 9–15	(silver) Runner-up
2005	Mongolian Satellite	(South Korea) Ha Jung-eun	(China) Tao Xiaolan (China) Wu Bei		(silver) Runner-up
2005	Vietnam Satellite	(South Korea) Ha Jung-eun	(South Korea) Kang hae-won (South Korea) Kim Min-jung	15–6, 7–15, 15–5	(gold) Winner
2003	Norwegian International	(South Korea) Ha Jung-eun	(South Korea) Jang Soo-young (South Korea) Kim Mi-young	15–6, 15–2	(gold) Winner

Mixed doubles
Year	Tournament	Partner	Opponent	Score	Result
2005	Vietnam Satellite	(South Korea) Hwang Ji-man	(South Korea) Jeon Jun-bum (South Korea) Ha Jung-eun	7–15, 15–6, 15–12	(gold) Winner

BWF International Challenge tournament
BWF International Series tournament
