= Yu Yang (badminton) =

Chinese badminton player (born 1986)

Yu Yang 于洋
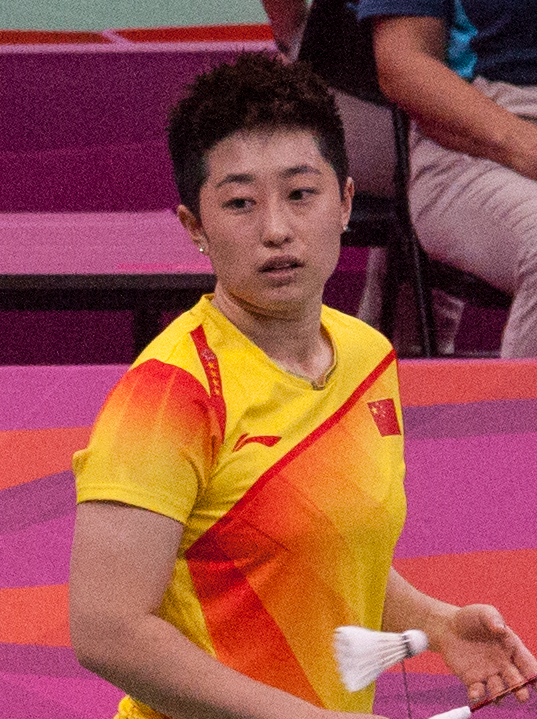
- Yu at the 2012 Summer Olympics

Personal information
- Born: April 7, 1986 (age 40) Haicheng, Liaoning, China
- Height: 1.68 m (5 ft 6 in)

Sport
- Country: China
- Sport: Badminton
- Handedness: Right

Women's & mixed doubles
- Highest ranking: 1 (April 28, 2011)
- BWF profile
Medal record
Women's badminton
Representing China
Olympic Games
Gold medal – first place	2008 Beijing	Women's doubles
Bronze medal – third place	2008 Beijing	Mixed doubles
World Championships
Gold medal – first place	2010 Paris	Women's doubles
Gold medal – first place	2011 London	Women's doubles
Gold medal – first place	2013 Guangzhou	Women's doubles
Silver medal – second place	2010 Paris	Mixed doubles
Silver medal – second place	2014 Copenhagen	Women's doubles
Bronze medal – third place	2006 Madrid	Women's doubles
Bronze medal – third place	2009 Hyderabad	Women's doubles
Sudirman Cup
Gold medal – first place	2009 Guangzhou	Mixed team
Gold medal – first place	2011 Qingdao	Mixed team
Gold medal – first place	2013 Kuala Lumpur	Mixed team
Gold medal – first place	2015 Dongguan	Mixed team
Uber Cup
Gold medal – first place	2006 Sendai/Tokyo	Women's team
Gold medal – first place	2012 Wuhan	Women's team
Gold medal – first place	2016 Kunshan	Women's team
Silver medal – second place	2010 Kuala Lumpur	Women's team
Asian Games
Gold medal – first place	2010 Guangzhou	Women's team
Gold medal – first place	2014 Incheon	Women's team
Silver medal – second place	2010 Guangzhou	Women's doubles
Asian Championships
Gold medal – first place	2006 Johor Bahru	Women's doubles
Gold medal – first place	2007 Johor Bahru	Mixed doubles
Gold medal – first place	2011 Chengdu	Women's doubles
Gold medal – first place	2013 Taipei	Women's doubles
Silver medal – second place	2004 Kuala Lumpur	Women's doubles
Silver medal – second place	2015 Wuhan	Women's doubles
Bronze medal – third place	2004 Kuala Lumpur	Mixed doubles
Bronze medal – third place	2006 Johor Bahru	Mixed doubles
Bronze medal – third place	2008 Johor Bahru	Mixed doubles
Asia Team Championships
Gold medal – first place	2016 Hyderabad	Women's team
World Junior Championships
Gold medal – first place	2002 Pretoria	Mixed doubles
Gold medal – first place	2002 Pretoria	Mixed team
Gold medal – first place	2004 Richmond	Girls' doubles
Gold medal – first place	2004 Richmond	Mixed doubles
Gold medal – first place	2004 Richmond	Mixed team
Silver medal – second place	2002 Pretoria	Girls' doubles
Asian Junior Championships
Gold medal – first place	2002 Kuala Lumpur	Girls' team

Yu Yang (Chinese: 于洋; pinyin: Yú Yáng; born April 7, 1986) is a retired Chinese badminton player specializing in doubles. She is an Olympic Games gold medalist, three time World Champion and four time Asian Champion. Yu was part of the China winning team in four Sudirman Cup, three Uber Cup, two Asian Games, and in a Asia Team Championships.

She graduated with a bachelor's degree from the University of Science and Technology of China.

== Career ==
A doubles specialist, Yu and her regular partner Du Jing have steadily emerged as one of the world's elite women's doubles teams since 2004. They confirmed this status by winning the gold medal at the 2008 Olympics in Beijing over South Korea's Lee Hyo-jung and Lee Kyung-won. Their other titles have included the Polish Open (2004): the China Masters (2005); the Asian Championships and Swiss Open in 2006; the Russian, Hong Kong, and Indonesia Opens in 2007; and the French, South Korea, and Singapore Opens in 2008. Yu and Du were bronze medalists at the World Championships in 2006, but were unable to play in the tourney's 2007 edition. They were runners-up at the prestigious All-England Championships in 2008, but avenged that loss by beating their All-England conquerors in the Olympic final.

Yu has also enjoyed recent success in mixed doubles with He Hanbin. They captured titles at the Badminton Asia Championships and the Thailand and Denmark Opens in 2007; and the India, Swiss, Malaysia, and French Opens in 2008. They finished in third place at the Beijing Olympics, making Yu one of only two players to win two medals at the competition.

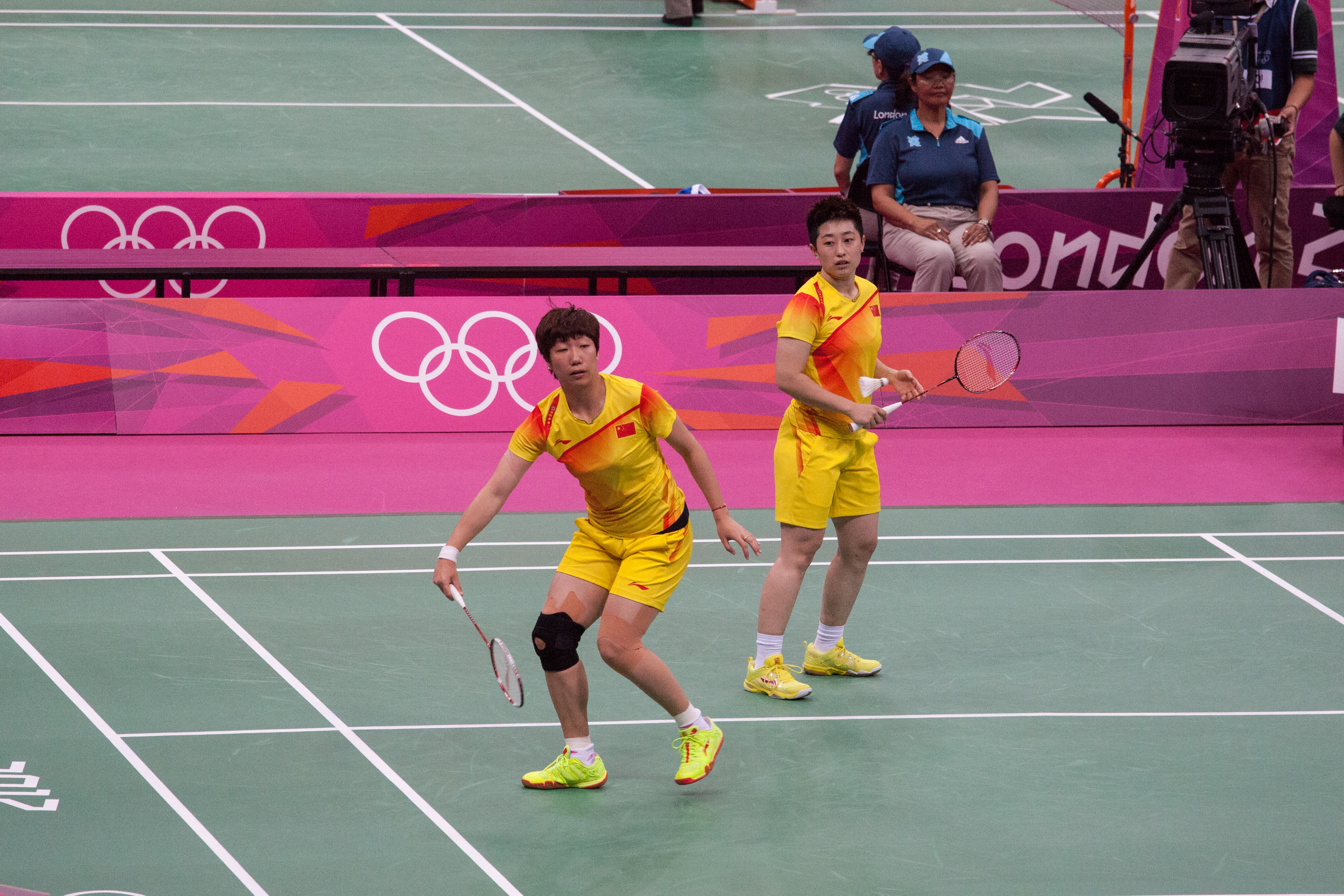
Yu (right) and Wang Xiaoli at the 2012 Summer Olympics

At the 2012 Summer Olympics, Yu Yang and her partner, Wang Xiaoli, along with Jung Kyung-eun and Kim Ha-na, Ha Jung-eun and Kim Min-jung of South Korea, and Meiliana Jauhari and Greysia Polii of Indonesia were disqualified from the competition for "not using one's best efforts to win a match" and "conducting oneself in a manner that is clearly abusive or detrimental to the sport" following matches the previous evening during which they were accused of throwing the match. Yu Yang and Wang Xiaoli played against South Korea's Jung Kyung-eun and Kim Ha-na, and it has been suggested both teams wanted to lose in order to secure an easier draw, although Yu claimed "she and her partner were just trying to conserve their strength for the knockout rounds". Shortly after, Yu Yang announced that she would retire from badminton.

== Achievements ==
=== Olympic Games ===
Women's doubles
Year	Venue	Partner	Opponent	Score	Result
2008	Beijing University of Technology Gymnasium, Beijing, China	(China) Du Jing	(South Korea) Lee Hyo-jung (South Korea) Lee Kyung-won	21–15, 21–13	Gold

Mixed doubles
Year	Venue	Partner	Opponent	Score	Result
2008	Beijing University of Technology Gymnasium, Beijing, China	(China) He Hanbin	(Indonesia) Flandy Limpele (Indonesia) Vita Marissa	19–21, 21–17, 23–21	Bronze

=== BWF World Championships ===
Women's doubles
Year	Venue	Partner	Opponent	Score	Result
2006	Palacio de Deportes de la Comunidad, Madrid, Spain	(China) Du Jing	(China) Gao Ling (China) Huang Sui	21–18, 20–22, 21–17	Bronze
2009	Gachibowli Indoor Stadium, Hyderabad, India	(China) Du Jing	(China) Zhang Yawen (China) Zhao Tingting	22–24, 21–18, 8–21	Bronze
2010	Stade Pierre de Coubertin, Paris, France	(China) Du Jing	(China) Ma Jin (China) Wang Xiaoli	21–9, 21–17	Gold
2011	Wembley Arena, London, England	(China) Wang Xiaoli	(China) Tian Qing (China) Zhao Yunlei	22–20, 21–11	Gold
2013	Tianhe Sports Center, Guangzhou, China	(China) Wang Xiaoli	(South Korea) Eom Hye-won (South Korea) Jang Ye-na	21–14, 18–21, 21–8	Gold
2014	Ballerup Super Arena, Copenhagen, Denmark	(China) Wang Xiaoli	(China) Tian Qing (China) Zhao Yunlei	19–21, 15–21	Silver

Mixed doubles
Year	Venue	Partner	Opponent	Score	Result
2010	Stade Pierre de Coubertin, Paris, France	(China) He Hanbin	(China) Zheng Bo (China) Ma Jin	14–21, 10–21	Silver

=== Asian Games ===
Women's doubles
Year	Venue	Partner	Opponent	Score	Result
2010	Tianhe Gymnasium, Guangzhou, China	(China) Wang Xiaoli	(China) Tian Qing (China) Zhao Yunlei	22–20, 15–21, 12–21	Silver

=== Asian Championships ===
Women's doubles
Year	Venue	Partner	Opponent	Score	Result
2004	Kuala Lumpur Badminton Stadium, Kuala Lumpur, Malaysia	(China) Du Jing	(South Korea) Lee Hyo-jung (South Korea) Lee Kyung-won	15–6, 11–15, 7–15	Silver
2006	Bandaraya Stadium, Johor Bahru, Malaysia	(China) Du Jing	(Chinese Taipei) Cheng Wen-hsing (Chinese Taipei) Chien Yu-chin	21–11, 21–16	Gold
2011	Sichuan Gymnasium, Chengdu, China	(China) Wang Xiaoli	(China) Tian Qing (China) Zhao Yunlei	21–13, 21–10	Gold
2013	Taipei Arena, Taipei, Taiwan	(China) Wang Xiaoli	(China) Ma Jin (China) Tang Jinhua	21–15, 14–21, 21–15	Gold
2015	Wuhan Sports Center Gymnasium, Wuhan, China	(China) Wang Xiaoli	(China) Ma Jin (China) Tang Yuanting	12–21, 12–21	Silver

Mixed doubles
Year	Venue	Partner	Opponent	Score	Result
2004	Kuala Lumpur Badminton Stadium, Kuala Lumpur, Malaysia	(China) Xie Zhongbo	(Thailand) Sudket Prapakamol (Thailand) Saralee Thungthongkam	3–15, 11–15	Bronze
2006	Bandaraya Stadium, Johor Bahru, Malaysia	(China) Zhang Wei	(Indonesia) Nova Widianto (Indonesia) Liliyana Natsir	9–21, 9–21	Bronze
2007	Bandaraya Stadium, Johor Bahru, Malaysia	(China) He Hanbin	(China) Xu Chen (China) Zhao Tingting	22–20, 21–15	Gold
2008	Bandaraya Stadium, Johor Bahru, Malaysia	(China) He Hanbin	(Indonesia) Nova Widianto (Indonesia) Liliyana Natsir	14–21, 17–21	Bronze

=== World Junior Championships ===
Girls' doubles
Year	Venue	Partner	Opponent	Score	Result
2002	Pretoria Showgrounds, Pretoria, South Africa	(China) Chen Lanting	(China) Du Jing (China) Rong Lu	6–11, 7–11	Silver
2004	Minoru Arena, Richmond, Canada	(China) Tian Qing	(China) Feng Chen (China) Pan Pan	15–3, 15–5	Gold

Mixed doubles
Year	Venue	Partner	Opponent	Score	Result
2002	Pretoria Showgrounds, Pretoria, South Africa	(China) Guo Zhendong	(China) Cao Chen (China) Rong Lu	11–2, 11–1	Gold
2004	Minoru Arena, Richmond, Canada	(China) He Hanbin	(Indonesia) Muhammad Rijal (Indonesia) Greysia Polii	15–12, 15–12	Gold

=== BWF Superseries (42 titles, 16 runner-ups) ===
The BWF Superseries, which was launched on December 14, 2006 and implemented in 2007, is a series of elite badminton tournaments, sanctioned by the Badminton World Federation (BWF). BWF Superseries levels are Superseries and Superseries Premier. A season of Superseries consists of twelve tournaments around the world that have been introduced since 2011. Successful players are invited to the Superseries Finals, which are held at the end of each year.

Women's doubles
Year	Tournament	Partner	Opponent	Score	Result
2007	Indonesia Open	(China) Du Jing	(China) Yang Wei (China) Zhao Tingting	21–8, 16–21, 22–20	(gold) Winner
2007	Japan Open	(China) Zhao Tingting	(China) Yang Wei (China) Zhang Jiewen	17–21, 5–21	(silver) Runner-up
2007	French Open	(China) Zhao Tingting	(China) Wei Yili (China) Zhang Yawen	10–21, 15–21	(silver) Runner-up
2007	China Open	(China) Du Jing	(China) Gao Ling (China) Zhao Tingting	21–17, 15–21, 8–21	(silver) Runner-up
2007	Hong Kong Open	(China) Du Jing	(China) Wei Yili (China) Zhang Yawen	22–20, 13–21, 21–17	(gold) Winner
2008	Korea Open	(China) Du Jing	(China) Gao Ling (China) Zhao Tingting	21–15, 21–13	(gold) Winner
2008	All England Open	(China) Du Jing	(South Korea) Lee Hyo-jung (South Korea) Lee Kyung-won	21–12, 18–21, 14–21	(silver) Runner-up
2008	Singapore Open	(China) Du Jing	(Chinese Taipei) Cheng Wen-hsing (Chinese Taipei) Chien Yu-chin	21–16, 21–19	(gold) Winner
2008	French Open	(China) Du Jing	(Malaysia) Chin Eei Hui (Malaysia) Wong Pei Tty	20–22, 21–19, 21–11	(gold) Winner
2009	Swiss Open	(China) Du Jing	(South Korea) Lee Hyo-jung (South Korea) Lee Kyung-won	21–11, 21–12	(gold) Winner
2009	China Masters	(China) Du Jing	(China) Cheng Shu (China) Zhao Yunlei	21–15, 21–15	(gold) Winner
2009	Hong Kong Open	(China) Du Jing	(China) Ma Jin (China) Wang Xiaoli	21–16, 19–21, 12–21	(silver) Runner-up
2009	China Open	(China) Du Jing	(China) Tian Qing (China) Zhang Yawen	14–21, 14–21	(silver) Runner-up
2010	Malaysia Open	(China) Du Jing	(China) Ma Jin (China) Wang Xiaoli	21–16, 21–12	(gold) Winner
2010	All England Open	(China) Du Jing	(China) Cheng Shu (China) Zhao Yunlei	20–22, 21–16, 21–13	(gold) Winner
2010	Swiss Open	(China) Tian Qing	(Japan) Miyuki Maeda (Japan) Satoko Suetsuna	21–16, 21–13	(gold) Winner
2010	China Masters	(China) Wang Xiaoli	(China) Bao Yixin (China) Lu Lu	21–8, 21–8	(gold) Winner
2010	Japan Open	(China) Wang Xiaoli	(China) Cheng Shu (China) Zhao Yunlei	21–17, 21–6	(gold) Winner
2010	Hong Kong Open	(China) Wang Xiaoli	(Chinese Taipei) Cheng Wen-hsing (Chinese Taipei) Chien Yu-chin	21–11, 21–12	(gold) Winner
2010	World Superseries Finals	(China) Wang Xiaoli	(China) Cheng Shu (China) Zhao Yunlei	21–7, 21–17	(gold) Winner
2011	Malaysia Open	(China) Wang Xiaoli	(China) Tian Qing (China) Zhao Yunlei	12–21, 21–6, 17–21	(silver) Runner-up
2011	Korea Open	(China) Wang Xiaoli	(China) Tian Qing (China) Zhao Yunlei	21–18, 19–21, 21–4	(gold) Winner
2011	All England Open	(China) Wang Xiaoli	(Japan) Mizuki Fujii (Japan) Reika Kakiiwa	21–2, 21–9	(gold) Winner
2011	Indonesia Open	(China) Wang Xiaoli	(Indonesia) Vita Marissa (Indonesia) Nadya Melati	21–12, 21–10	(gold) Winner
2011	China Masters	(China) Wang Xiaoli	(China) Tang Jinhua (China) Xia Huan	19–21, retired	(silver) Runner-up
2011	Denmark Open	(China) Wang Xiaoli	(China) Tian Qing (China) Zhao Yunlei	22–20, 21–16	(gold) Winner
2011	French Open	(China) Wang Xiaoli	(China) Tian Qing (China) Zhao Yunlei	26–24, 21–15	(gold) Winner
2011	Hong Kong Open	(China) Wang Xiaoli	(China) Tian Qing (China) Zhao Yunlei	21–12, 14–2 retired	(gold) Winner
2011	China Open	(China) Wang Xiaoli	(China) Tang Jinhua (China) Xia Huan	21–11, 21–10	(gold) Winner
2011	World Superseries Finals	(China) Wang Xiaoli	(South Korea) Ha Jung-eun (South Korea) Kim Min-jung	21–8, 21–12	(gold) Winner
2012	All England Open	(China) Wang Xiaoli	(China) Tian Qing (China) Zhao Yunlei	17–21, 12–21	(silver) Runner-up
2012	Indonesia Open	(China) Wang Xiaoli	(China) Tian Qing (China) Zhao Yunlei	17–21, 21–9, 21–16	(gold) Winner
2012	China Open	(China) Wang Xiaoli	(Japan) Miyuki Maeda (Japan) Satoko Suetsuna	21–19, 14–7 retired	(gold) Winner
2012	Hong Kong Open	(China) Wang Xiaoli	(China) Tian Qing (China) Zhao Yunlei	20–22, 21–14, 17–21	(silver) Runner-up
2012	World Superseries Finals	(China) Wang Xiaoli	(Denmark) Christinna Pedersen (Denmark) Kamilla Rytter Juhl	21–16, 21–14	(gold) Winner
2013	Korea Open	(China) Wang Xiaoli	(China) Ma Jin (China) Tang Jinhua	21–17, 21–13	(gold) Winner
2013	All England Open	(China) Wang Xiaoli	(China) Cheng Shu (China) Zhao Yunlei	21–18, 21–10	(gold) Winner
2013	Indonesia Open	(China) Wang Xiaoli	(China) Bao Yixin (China) Cheng Shu	21–15, 18–21, 18–21	(silver) Runner-up
2013	China Masters	(China) Wang Xiaoli	(China) Ma Jin (China) Tang Jinhua	21–17, 21–16	(gold) Winner
2013	China Open	(China) Wang Xiaoli	(China) Bao Yixin (China) Zhong Qianxin	21–13, 21–7	(gold) Winner
2014	All England Open	(China) Wang Xiaoli	(China) Ma Jin (China) Tang Yuanting	21–17, 18–21, 23–21	(gold) Winner
2014	India Open	(China) Tang Yuanting	(South Korea) Jung Kyung-eun (South Korea) Kim Ha-na	21–10, 13–21, 21–16	(gold) Winner
2014	Denmark Open	(China) Wang Xiaoli	(Japan) Misaki Matsutomo (Japan) Ayaka Takahashi	21–14, 21–14	(gold) Winner
2014	French Open	(China) Wang Xiaoli	(China) Ma Jin (China) Tang Yuanting	21–15, 21–9	(gold) Winner
2014	China Open	(China) Wang Xiaoli	(China) Tian Qing (China) Zhao Yunlei	21–16, 19–21, 22–20	(gold) Winner
2015	All England Open	(China) Wang Xiaoli	(China) Bao Yixin (China) Tang Yuanting	14–21, 14–21	(silver) Runner-up
2015	China Open	(China) Tang Yuanting	(Japan) Misaki Matsutomo (Japan) Ayaka Takahashi	18–21, 21–13, 21–12	(gold) Winner
2015	Hong Kong Open	(China) Tang Yuanting	(China) Tian Qing (China) Zhao Yunlei	15–21, 12–21	(silver) Runner-up
2016	All England Open	(China) Tang Yuanting	(Japan) Misaki Matsutomo (Japan) Ayaka Takahashi	10–21, 12–21	(silver) Runner-up
2016	Malaysia Open	(China) Tang Yuanting	(South Korea) Jung Kyung-eun (South Korea) Shin Seung-chan	21–11, 21–17	(gold) Winner
2016	Indonesia Open	(China) Tang Yuanting	(Japan) Misaki Matsutomo (Japan) Ayaka Takahashi	15–21, 21–8, 15–21	(silver) Runner-up

Mixed doubles
Year	Tournament	Partner	Opponent	Score	Result
2007	Denmark Open	(China) He Hanbin	(England) Nathan Robertson (England) Gail Emms	21–17, 19–21, 21–17	(gold) Winner
2008	Malaysia Open	(China) He Hanbin	(South Korea) Lee Yong-dae (South Korea) Lee Hyo-jung	21–14, 21–15	(gold) Winner
2008	Swiss Open	(China) He Hanbin	(England) Anthony Clark (England) Donna Kellogg	21–15, 21–9	(gold) Winner
2008	French Open	(China) He Hanbin	(England) Anthony Clark (England) Donna Kellogg	21–13, 21–19	(gold) Winner
2009	All England Open	(China) He Hanbin	(South Korea) Ko Sung-hyun (South Korea) Ha Jung-eun	13–21, 21–15, 21–9	(gold) Winner
2010	Korea Open	(China) He Hanbin	(China) Tao Jiaming (China) Zhang Yawen	21–15, 21–16	(gold) Winner
2010	China Masters	(China) Xu Chen	(China) Tao Jiaming (China) Tian Qing	11–21, 14–21	(silver) Runner-up

BWF Super Series Finals tournament
BWF Super Series Premier tournament
BWF Super Series tournament

=== BWF Grand Prix (10 titles, 9 runner-ups) ===
The BWF Grand Prix had two levels, the BWF Grand Prix and Grand Prix Gold. It was a series of badminton tournaments sanctioned by the Badminton World Federation (BWF) which was held from 2007 to 2017.

Women's doubles
Year	Tournament	Partner	Opponent	Score	Result
2004	Thailand Open	(China) Du Jing	(China) Zhang Dan (China) Zhang Yawen	5–15, 7–15	(silver) Runner-up
2005	China Masters	(China) Du Jing	(China) Gao Ling (China) Huang Sui	15–4, 17–14	(gold) Winner
2006	Swiss Open	(China) Du Jing	(China) Zhang Dan (China) Zhao Tingting	15–5, 10–15, 15–11	(gold) Winner
2007	German Open	(China) Du Jing	(China) Yang Wei (China) Zhang Jiewen	8–21, 7–21	(silver) Runner-up
2007	Thailand Open	(China) Du Jing	(China) Gao Ling (China) Huang Sui	Walkover	(silver) Runner-up
2007	Russian Open	(China) Du Jing	(Chinese Taipei) Cheng Wen-hsing (Chinese Taipei) Chien Yu-chin	21–14, 21–14	(gold) Winner
2009	Macau Open	(China) Du Jing	(China) Yang Wei (China) Zhang Jiewen	21–16, 21–11	(gold) Winner
2014	Chinese Taipei Open	(China) Wang Xiaoli	(Indonesia) Nitya Krishinda Maheswari (Indonesia) Greysia Polii	18–21, 11–21	(silver) Runner-up
2015	U.S. Open	(China) Zhong Qianxin	(Japan) Ayane Kurihara (Japan) Naru Shinoya	21–14, 21–10	(gold) Winner
2015	Bitburger Open	(China) Tang Yuanting	(Hong Kong) Poon Lok Yan (Hong Kong) Tse Ying Suet	21–10, 21–18	(gold) Winner
2015	Indonesian Masters	(China) Tang Yuanting	(Indonesia) Nitya Krishinda Maheswari (Indonesia) Greysia Polii	21–17, 21–11	(gold) Winner
2016	Malaysia Masters	(China) Tang Yuanting	(Japan) Misaki Matsutomo (Japan) Ayaka Takahashi	18–21, 20–22	(silver) Runner-up
2016	Thailand Masters	(China) Tang Yuanting	(China) Tian Qing (China) Zhao Yunlei	21–11, 12–21, 21–23	(silver) Runner-up

Mixed doubles
Year	Tournament	Partner	Opponent	Score	Result
2007	Thailand Open	(China) He Hanbin	(South Korea) Han Sang-hoon (South Korea) Hwang Yu-mi	21–12, 21–14	(gold) Winner
2007	Russian Open	(China) He Hanbin	(Poland) Robert Mateusiak (Poland) Nadieżda Kostiuczyk	23–25, 21–13, 13–21	(silver) Runner-up
2008	German Open	(China) He Hanbin	(South Korea) Lee Yong-dae (South Korea) Lee Hyo-jung	21–9, 25–27, 18–21	(silver) Runner-up
2008	India Open	(China) He Hanbin	(Germany) Kristof Hopp (Germany) Birgit Overzier	21–18, 21–9	(gold) Winner
2008	Thailand Open	(China) He Hanbin	(China) Xie Zhongbo (China) Zhang Yawen	25–23, 10–21, 21–23	(silver) Runner-up
2009	Macau Open	(China) He Hanbin	(Indonesia) Hendra Aprida Gunawan (Indonesia) Vita Marissa	21–14, 21–9	(gold) Winner

BWF Grand Prix Gold tournament
BWF Grand Prix tournament

=== IBF International (3 titles) ===
Women's doubles
Year	Tournament	Partner	Opponent	Score	Result
2004	French International	(China) Du Jing	(China) Feng Chen (China) Pan Pan	5–15, 15–4, 15–6	(gold) Winner
2004	Polish International	(China) Du Jing	(China) Feng Chen (China) Pan Pan	15–5, 15–6	(gold) Winner

Mixed doubles
Year	Tournament	Partner	Opponent	Score	Result
2004	French International	(China) Xie Zhongbo	(Russia) Nikolaj Zuev (Russia) Marina Yakusheva	17–16, 15–9	(gold) Winner

== Record against selected opponents ==
Women's doubles results with former partner Du Jing against Super Series finalists, World semi-finalists, and Olympic quarterfinalists:

- (Bulgaria) Petya Nedelcheva & (Russia) Anastasia Russkikh 1–0
- (China) Cheng Shu & Zhao Yunlei 5–0
- (China) Gao Ling & Huang Sui 1–2
- (China) Ma Jin & Wang Xiaoli 4–1
- (China) Pan Pan & Zhang Yawen 1–0
- (China) Tian Qing & Zhang Yawen 1–1
- (China) Wei Yili & Zhang Yawen 6–0
- (China) Wei Yili & Zhao Tingting 0–1
- (China) Yang Wei & Zhang Jiewen 2–6
- (Chinese Taipei) Cheng Wen-hsing & Chien Yu-chin 8–0
- (India) Jwala Gutta & Ashwini Ponnappa 1–0
- (Japan) Mizuki Fujii & Reika Kakiiwa 1–0
- (Japan) Miyuki Maeda & Satoko Suetsuna 5–0
- (Japan) Kumiko Ogura & Reiko Shiota 6–0
- (South Korea) Ha Jung-eun & Kim Min-jung 3–0
- (South Korea) Lee Hyo-jung & Lee Kyung-won 6–4
- (Malaysia) Chin Eei Hui & Wong Pei Tty 5–1
- (Singapore) Jiang Yanmei & Li Yujia 2–0
- (Thailand) Duanganong Aroonkesorn & Kunchala Voravichitchaikul 4–0
