= 2004 IBF World Junior Championships – girls' doubles =

2004 IBF World Junior Championships girls' doubles
Tournament details
- Dates: 25 October 2004 – 30 October 2004
- Edition: 7th
- Level: International
- Venue: Minoru Arena
- Location: Richmond, Canada

The girls' doubles event for the 2004 IBF World Junior Championships was held between 25 October and 30 October. Tian Qing and Yu Yang of China won the title.

== Seeded ==
1. (China) Tian Qing / Yu Yang (champion)
2. (China) Feng Chen / Pan Pan (final)
3. (Indonesia) Greysia Polii / Heni Budiman (semi-final)
4. (South Korea) Ha Jung-eun / Oh Seul-ki (semi-final)
5. (Denmark) Christinna Pedersen / Tinne Kruse (quarter-final)
6. (Japan) Kana Mizuma / Yuina Kimura (second round)
7. (Chinese Taipei) Hsieh Pei-chen / Tsai Pei-ling (quarter-final)
8. (South Korea) Park So-ri / Park Soo-hee (quarter-final)

== Draw ==
=== Finals ===
Semifinals
1	(China) Tian Qing (China) Yu Yang	15	15
3/4	(Indonesia) Greysia Polii (Indonesia) Heni Budiman	1	2
3/4	(South Korea) Ha Jung-eun (South Korea) Oh Seul-ki	10	9
2	(China) Feng Chen (China) Pan Pan	15	15

Final
1	(China) Tian Qing (China) Yu Yang	15	15
2	(China) Feng Chen (China) Pan Pan	3	5

=== Top half ===
==== Section 1 ====
First round

Second round
1	(China) Tian Q (China) Yu Y	15	15
(Singapore) V Neo (Singapore) C Goh	0	2
(Denmark) D Matthiesen (Denmark) M Nielsen
(Russia) A Kudinova (Russia) E Chernjavskaya	WO
5/8	(South Korea) Park S-r (South Korea) Park S-h	15	15
(India) S Gokhale (India) V Dave	1	5
(Hong Kong) Yip PY (Hong Kong) Lam SY
(Bulgaria) L Zetchiri (Switzerland) J Cicognini	WO

Third round
1	(China) Tian Q (China) Yu Y	15	15
(Denmark) D Matthiesen (Denmark) M Nielsen	1	3
5/8	(South Korea) Park S-r (South Korea) Park S-h	15	15
(Hong Kong) Yip PY (Hong Kong) Lam SY	3	8

Quarter finals
1	(China) Tian Q (China) Yu Y	15	15
5/8	(South Korea) Park S-r (South Korea) Park S-h	1	2

==== Section 2 ====
First round
(Chinese Taipei) Yang C-h (Chinese Taipei) Hung S-t	15	15
(Nigeria) M Samuel (Nigeria) M Gideon	2	1

Second round
3/4	(Indonesia) G Polii (Indonesia) H Budiman	15	15
(United States) L Todt (United States) T Kimura	2	2
(England) H Olver (England) J Wallwork	3	17	15
(Czech Republic) P Janošová (Czech Republic) K Ludíková	15	16	5
5/8	(Japan) K Mizuma (Japan) Y Kimura	13	15	6
(Germany) J Köhler (Germany) A Lillie	15	11	15
(Canada) J Ko (Canada) C Chau	5	15	9
(Chinese Taipei) Yang C-h (Chinese Taipei) Hung S-t	15	13	15

Third round
3/4	(Indonesia) G Polii (Indonesia) H Budiman	15	15
(England) H Olver (England) J Wallwork	5	10
(Germany) J Köhler (Germany) A Lillie	15	15
(Chinese Taipei) Yang C-h (Chinese Taipei) Hung S-t	5	8

Quarter finals
3/4	(Indonesia) G Polii (Indonesia) H Budiman	15	15
(Germany) J Köhler (Germany) A Lillie	7	13

=== Bottom half ===
==== Section 3 ====
First round
(Japan) M Sekiya (Japan) Y Oku	8	4
(India) A Balan (India) S Nehwal	15	15

Second round
(India) A Balan (India) S Nehwal	17	15
(Netherlands) E Besselink (Netherlands) I Vaessen	14	3
(Sweden) E Lennartsson (Sweden) S Jonsson	8	9
5/8	(Chinese Taipei) Hsieh P-c (Chinese Taipei) Tsai P-l	15	15
(Canada) S Ralph (Canada) A Man	9	3
(Malaysia) A Anscelly (Malaysia) Haw CH	15	15
(Russia) N Vislova (Russia) O Kozlova	1	1
3/4	(South Korea) Ha J-e (South Korea) Oh S-k	15	15

Third round
(India) A Balan (India) S Nehwal	7	4
5/8	(Chinese Taipei) Hsieh P-c (Chinese Taipei) Tsai P-l	15	15
(Malaysia) A Anscelly (Malaysia) Haw CH	0	4
3/4	(South Korea) Ha J-e (South Korea) Oh S-k	15	15

Quarter finals
5/8	(Chinese Taipei) Hsieh P-c (Chinese Taipei) Tsai P-l	4	1
3/4	(South Korea) Ha J-e (South Korea) Oh S-k	15	15

==== Section 4 ====
First round

Second round
(Indonesia) N Maheswari (Indonesia) Y Kartika	15	15
(Peru) C Aicardi (Peru) C Rivero	5	10
(Germany) J Goliszewski (Germany) M Reich	2	1
5/8	(Denmark) C Pedersen (Denmark) T Kruse	15	15
(Hong Kong) Chan TK (Hong Kong) Mong KY	15	13	5
(Slovenia) Š Silvester (Slovenia) U Silvester	8	15	15
(England) M Agathangelou (England) M Cheung	2	1
2	(China) Feng C (China) Pan P	15	15

Third round
(Indonesia) N Maheswari (Indonesia) Y Kartika	4	4
5/8	(Denmark) C Pedersen (Denmark) T Kruse	15	15
(Slovenia) Š Silvester (Slovenia) U Silvester	2	1
2	(China) Feng C (China) Pan P	15	15

Quarter finals
5/8	(Denmark) C Pedersen (Denmark) T Kruse	5	4
2	(China) Feng C (China) Pan P	15	15
