= 2013 BWF World Championships – Women's doubles =

Women's doubles at the 2013 BWF World Championships
- Venue: Tianhe Sports Center
- Location: Guangzhou, China
- Dates: August 5, 2013 – August 11, 2013

Medalists
gold medal	Wang Xiaoli; Yu Yang	China
silver medal	Eom Hye-won; Jang Ye-na	South Korea
bronze medal	Christinna Pedersen; Kamilla Rytter Juhl	Denmark
bronze medal	Tian Qing; Zhao Yunlei	China

The women's doubles tournament of the 2013 BWF World Championships (World Badminton Championships) was held from August 5 to 11. Wang Xiaoli and Yu Yang were the defending champions.

Wang Xiaoli and Yu Yang defeated Eom Hye-won and Jang Ye-na 21–14, 18–21, 21–8 in the final.

== Seeds ==
1. (China) Wang Xiaoli / Yu Yang (champion)
2. (China) Ma Jin / Tang Jinhua (quarterfinals)
3. (Japan) Misaki Matsutomo / Ayaka Takahashi (second round)
4. (Denmark) Christinna Pedersen / Kamilla Rytter Juhl (semifinals)
5. (China) Tian Qing / Zhao Yunlei (semifinals)
6. (Japan) Miyuki Maeda / Satoko Suetsuna (third round)
7. (China) Bao Yixin / Zhong Qianxin (quarterfinals)
8. (South Korea) Eom Hye-won / Jang Ye-na (final)

9. (Indonesia) Pia Zebadiah Bernadeth / Rizki Amelia Pradipta (quarterfinals)
10. (Thailand) Duanganong Aroonkesorn / Kunchala Voravichitchaikul (third round)
11. (South Korea) Jung Kyung-eun / Kim Ha-na (quarterfinals)
12. (Hong Kong) Poon Lok Yan / Tse Ying Suet (third round)
13. (South Korea) Lee So-hee / Shin Seung-chan (third round)
14. (Malaysia) Vivian Hoo Kah Mun / Woon Khe Wei (third round)
15. (Indonesia) Gebby Ristiyani Imawan / Tiara Rosalia Nuraidah (second round)
16. (South Korea) Ko A-ra / Yoo Hae-won (third round)

Click on the seed number of a player to go to their draw section.

== Draw ==
=== Finals ===
Quarterfinals
1	(China) Wang Xiaoli (China) Yu Yang	21	21
11	(South Korea) Jung Kyung-eun (South Korea) Kim Ha-na	11	19
4	(Denmark) Christinna Pedersen (Denmark) Kamilla Rytter Juhl	21	13	21
7	(China) Bao Yixin (China) Zhong Qianxin	17	21	18
8	(South Korea) Eom Hye-won (South Korea) Jang Ye-na	22	21
9	(Indonesia) Pia Zebadiah Bernadeth (Indonesia) Rizki Amelia Pradipta	20	15
5	(China) Tian Qing (China) Zhao Yunlei	21	21
2	(China) Ma Jin (China) Tang Jinhua	17	17

Semifinals
1	(China) Wang Xiaoli (China) Yu Yang	21	14	21
4	(Denmark) Christinna Pedersen (Denmark) Kamilla Rytter Juhl	14	21	15
8	(South Korea) Eom Hye-won (South Korea) Jang Ye-na	21	21
5	(China) Tian Qing (China) Zhao Yunlei	16	19

Final
1	(China) Wang Xiaoli (China) Yu Yang	21	18	21
8	(South Korea) Eom Hye-won (South Korea) Jang Ye-na	14	21	8

=== Section 1 ===
First Round
(Malaysia) Ng Hui Ern (Malaysia) Ng Hui Lin	21	21
(New Zealand) Amanda Brown (New Zealand) Kritteka Gregory	9	8
(Hong Kong) Chan Hung Yung (Hong Kong) Chau Hoi Wah	14	13
(Germany) Johanna Goliszewski (Germany) Birgit Michels	21	21
(Malaysia) Goh Liu Ying (Malaysia) Lim Yin Loo	21	19	21
(Russia) Irina Khlebko (Russia) Ksenia Polikarpova	13	21	9

Second Round
1	(China) Wang Xiaoli (China) Yu Yang	21	23
(Chinese Taipei) Cheng Wen-hsing (Chinese Taipei) Hsieh Pei-chen	6	21
13	(South Korea) Lee So-hee (South Korea) Shin Seung-chan	21	20	25
(Malaysia) Ng Hui Ern (Malaysia) Ng Hui Lin	13	22	23
6	(Japan) Miyuki Maeda (Japan) Satoko Suetsuna	21	11	21
(Germany) Johanna Goliszewski (Germany) Birgit Michels	15	21	13
11	(South Korea) Jung Kyung-eun (South Korea) Kim Ha-na	22	21
(Malaysia) Goh Liu Ying (Malaysia) Lim Yin Loo	20	7

Third Round
1	(China) Wang Xiaoli (China) Yu Yang	21	21
13	(South Korea) Lee So-hee (South Korea) Shin Seung-chan	7	3
6	(Japan) Miyuki Maeda (Japan) Satoko Suetsuna	9	18
11	(South Korea) Jung Kyung-eun (South Korea) Kim Ha-na	21	21

Quarterfinals
1	(China) Wang Xiaoli (China) Yu Yang	21	21
11	(South Korea) Jung Kyung-eun (South Korea) Kim Ha-na	11	19

=== Section 2 ===
First Round
(Ukraine) Yuliya Kazarinova (Ukraine) Anna Kobceva	20	21	13
(United States) Eva Lee (United States) Paula Lynn Obanana	22	17	21
(Belgium) Mattijs Dierickx (Belgium) Freek Golinski	11	10
(Chinese Taipei) Chen Hsiao-huan (Chinese Taipei) Lai Chia-wen	21	21
(India) Aparna Balan (India) N. Siki Reddy	15	17
(England) Lauren Smith (England) Gabrielle White	21	21
(Chinese Taipei) Chien Yu-chin (Chinese Taipei) Wu Ti-jung	19	19
(Japan) Rie Eto (Japan) Yu Wakita	21	21

Second Round
4	(Denmark) Christinna Pedersen (Denmark) Kamilla Rytter Juhl	21	21
(United States) Eva Lee (United States) Paula Lynn Obanana	9	15
10	(Thailand) Duanganong Aroonkesorn (Thailand) Kunchala Voravichitchaikul	21	21
(Chinese Taipei) Chen Hsiao-huan (Chinese Taipei) Lai Chia-wen	12	19
7	(China) Bao Yixin (China) Zhong Qianxin	21	21
(England) Lauren Smith (England) Gabrielle White	16	14
15	(Indonesia) Gebby Ristiyani Imawan (Indonesia) Tiara Rosalia Nuraidah	21	19	11
(Japan) Rie Eto (Japan) Yu Wakita	17	21	21

Third Round
4	(Denmark) Christinna Pedersen (Denmark) Kamilla Rytter Juhl	21	21
10	(Thailand) Duanganong Aroonkesorn (Thailand) Kunchala Voravichitchaikul	17	10
7	(China) Bao Yixin (China) Zhong Qianxin	21	21
(Japan) Rie Eto (Japan) Yu Wakita	12	19

Quarterfinals
4	(Denmark) Christinna Pedersen (Denmark) Kamilla Rytter Juhl	21	13	21
7	(China) Bao Yixin (China) Zhong Qianxin	17	21	18

=== Section 3 ===
First Round
(Japan) Yuriko Miki (Japan) Koharu Yonemoto	21	21
(New Zealand) Anna Rankin (New Zealand) Madeleine Stapleton	6	7
(Germany) Isabel Herttrich (Germany) Carla Nelte	21	13	18
(Bulgaria) Gabriela Stoeva (Bulgaria) Stefani Stoeva	19	21	21
(France) Audrey Fontaine (France) Emilie Lefel	12	14
(Malaysia) Amelia Alicia Anscelly (Malaysia) Soong Fie Cho	21	21
(Scotland) Imogen Bankier (Bulgaria) Petya Nedelcheva	21	18	16
(Thailand) Lam Narissapat (Thailand) Saralee Thoungthongkam	18	21	21

Second Round
(Japan) Yuriko Miki (Japan) Koharu Yonemoto	20	14
14	(Malaysia) Vivian Hoo Kah Mun (Malaysia) Woon Khe Wei	22	21
(Bulgaria) Gabriela Stoeva (Bulgaria) Stefani Stoeva	12	8
8	(South Korea) Eom Hye-won (South Korea) Jang Ye-na	21	21
(Malaysia) Amelia Alicia Anscelly (Malaysia) Soong Fie Cho	14	19
9	(Indonesia) Pia Zebadiah Bernadeth (Indonesia) Rizki Amelia Pradipta	21	21
(Thailand) Lam Narissapat (Thailand) Saralee Thoungthongkam	22	21
3	(Japan) Misaki Matsutomo (Japan) Ayaka Takahashi	20	17

Third Round
14	(Malaysia) Vivian Hoo Kah Mun (Malaysia) Woon Khe Wei	16	18
8	(South Korea) Eom Hye-won (South Korea) Jang Ye-na	21	21
9	(Indonesia) Pia Zebadiah Bernadeth (Indonesia) Rizki Amelia Pradipta	17	21	21
(Thailand) Lam Narissapat (Thailand) Saralee Thoungthongkam	21	16	11

Quarterfinals
8	(South Korea) Eom Hye-won (South Korea) Jang Ye-na	22	21
9	(Indonesia) Pia Zebadiah Bernadeth (Indonesia) Rizki Amelia Pradipta	20	15

=== Section 4 ===
First Round
(Chinese Taipei) Chiang Kai-hsin (Chinese Taipei) Tsai Pei-ling	21	14
(England) Heather Olver (England) Kate Robertshaw	23	21
(Denmark) Line Damkjaer Kruse (Denmark) Marie Roepke	21	21	21
(India) Pradnya Gadre (India) Ashwini Ponnappa	23	18	17
(United States) Rulan Yeh (United States) Rulien Yeh	6	8
(Russia) Tatjana Bibik (Russia) Anastasia Chervaykova	21	21

Second Round
(England) Heather Olver (England) Kate Robertshaw	10	15
16	(South Korea) Ko A-ra (South Korea) Yoo Hae-won	21	21
(Denmark) Line Damkjaer Kruse (Denmark) Marie Roepke	8	4
5	(China) Tian Qing (China) Zhao Yunlei	21	21
(Russia) Tatjana Bibik (Russia) Anastasia Chervaykova	10	15
12	(Hong Kong) Poon Lok Yan (Hong Kong) Tse Ying Suet	21	21
(Australia) Jacqueline Guan (Australia) Gronya Somerville	5	5
2	(China) Ma Jin (China) Tang Jinhua	21	21

Third Round
16	(South Korea) Ko A-ra (South Korea) Yoo Hae-won	13	10
5	(China) Tian Qing (China) Zhao Yunlei	21	21
12	(Hong Kong) Poon Lok Yan (Hong Kong) Tse Ying Suet	9	16
2	(China) Ma Jin (China) Tang Jinhua	21	21

Quarterfinals
5	(China) Tian Qing (China) Zhao Yunlei	21	21
2	(China) Ma Jin (China) Tang Jinhua	17	17
