= 2004 IBF World Junior Championships =

Tournament details
- Dates: October 21, 2004 - October 30, 2004
- Edition: 7th
- Venue: Minoru Arena
- Location: Richmond, Canada

The 2004 IBF World Junior Championships was an international badminton tournament held in Richmond, Canada.

== Medalists ==
Event	Gold	Silver	Bronze
Boys singles	(China) Chen Jin	(China) Gong Weijie	(South Korea) Hwang Jung-woon
Boys singles	(China) Chen Jin	(China) Gong Weijie	(South Korea) Lee Cheol-ho
Girls singles	(Chinese Taipei) Cheng Shao-chieh	(China) Lu Lan	(South Korea) Ha Jung-eun
Girls singles	(Chinese Taipei) Cheng Shao-chieh	(China) Lu Lan	(China) Wang Lin
Boys doubles	(Malaysia) Hoon Thien How (Malaysia) Tan Boon Heong	(South Korea) Lee Yong-dae (South Korea) Jung Jung-young	(South Korea) Yoo Yeon-seong (South Korea) Jeon Jun-bum
Boys doubles	(Malaysia) Hoon Thien How (Malaysia) Tan Boon Heong	(South Korea) Lee Yong-dae (South Korea) Jung Jung-young	(China) Shen Ye (China) He Hanbin
Girls doubles	(China) Tian Qing (China) Yu Yang	(China) Feng Chen (China) Pan Pan	(Indonesia) Greysia Polii (Indonesia) Heni Budiman
Girls doubles	(China) Tian Qing (China) Yu Yang	(China) Feng Chen (China) Pan Pan	(South Korea) Ha Jung-eun (South Korea) Oh Seul-ki
Mixed doubles	(China) He Hanbin (China) Yu Yang	(Indonesia) Muhammad Rijal (Indonesia) Greysia Polii	(South Korea) Lee Yong-dae (South Korea) Park Soo-hee
Mixed doubles	(China) He Hanbin (China) Yu Yang	(Indonesia) Muhammad Rijal (Indonesia) Greysia Polii	(Chinese Taipei) Lee Sheng-mu (Chinese Taipei) Cheng Shao-chieh
Teams	China; Cao Liu; Chen Jin; Chen Tianyu; Gong Weijie; He Hanbin; Li Rui; Lu Qicheng; Shen Ye; Feng Chen; Jiang Yanjiao; Lu Lan; Pan Pan; Tian Qing; Wang Lin; Wang Yihan; Yu Yang	South Korea; Han Ki-hoon; Hong Ji-hoon; Hwang Jung-woon; Jeon Jun-bum; Jung Jung-young; Lee Cheol-ho; Lee Yong-dae; Yoo Yeon-seong; Ha Jung-eun; Jang Soo-young; Kim Mi-young; Lee Hyun-jin; Oh Seul-ki; Park So-ri; Park Soo-hee	Indonesia; I Made Agung; Achmad Rivai; Muhammad Rijal; Tommy Sugiarto; Ari Yuli Wahyu; Markus Wijanu; Heni Budiman; Yuan Kartika; Nitya Krishinda Maheswari; Wiwis Meilyanna; Greysia Polii; Fransisca Ratnasari

== Team competition ==
A total of 20 countries competed at the team competition in 2004 IBF World Junior Championships.

=== Final positions ===
1. China
2. South Korea
3. Indonesia
4. Chinese Taipei
5. Malaysia
6. England
7. Denmark
8. Germany
9. Hong Kong
10. Russia
11. India
12. Slovenia (Debut)
13. Sweden
14. Japan
15. Singapore
16. Peru (Debut)
17. Netherlands
18. Canada
19. Czech Republic
20. United States (Debut)

=== Final Round ===
China
3
Richmond, Canada
October 24, 2004

South Korea
0

			1	2	3
1	(China) (South Korea)	Shen Ye / Feng Chen; Lee Yong-dae / Park So-hee	15; 6	15; 7
2	(China) (South Korea)	Jiang Yanjiao; Jang Soo-young	13; 10	11; 3
3	(China) (South Korea)	Chen Jin; Lee Cheol-ho	15; 3	15; 9
4	(China) (South Korea)	Tian Qing / Yu Yang; Ha Jung-eun / Oh Seul-ki				not played
5	(China) (South Korea)	Shen Ye / He Hanbin; Lee Yong-dae / Jung Jung-young				not played

== Medal table ==
Pos	Country	Gold	Silver	Bronze	Total
1	China	4	3	2	8
2	Chinese Taipei	1	0	1	2
2	Malaysia	1	0	0	1
4	South Korea	0	2	6	8
5	Indonesia	0	1	2	3
