= 2006 Asian Badminton Championships =

Badminton championships

Tournament details
- Host country: Malaysia
- City: Johor Bahru
- Venue(s): Bandaraya Stadium
- Dates: March 28 – April 2, 2006

The 2006 Asian Badminton Championships was the 25th edition of the Asian Badminton Championships. It was held in Johor Bahru, Malaysia from March 28 to April 2, 2006 as a four-star tournament.

== Medalists ==
Event	Gold	Silver	Bronze
Men's singles	(Malaysia) Lee Chong Wei	(Thailand) Boonsak Ponsana	(South Korea) Park Sung-hwan
Men's singles	(Malaysia) Lee Chong Wei	(Thailand) Boonsak Ponsana	(China) Chen Yu
Women's singles	(Hong Kong) Wang Chen	(Japan) Kaori Mori	(China) Jiang Yanjiao
Women's singles	(Hong Kong) Wang Chen	(Japan) Kaori Mori	(China) Chen Li
Men's doubles	(Malaysia) Choong Tan Fook and Lee Wan Wah	(Malaysia) Hoon Thien How and Tan Boon Heong	(Indonesia) Luluk Hadiyanto and Alvent Yulianto
Men's doubles	(Malaysia) Choong Tan Fook and Lee Wan Wah	(Malaysia) Hoon Thien How and Tan Boon Heong	(South Korea) Hwang Ji-man and Jung Tae-keuk
Women's doubles	(China) Du Jing and Yu Yang	(Chinese Taipei) Cheng Wen-hsing and Chien Yu-chin	(China) Pan Pan and Tian Qing
Women's doubles	(China) Du Jing and Yu Yang	(Chinese Taipei) Cheng Wen-hsing and Chien Yu-chin	(Malaysia) Lim Pek Siah and Joanne Quay
Mixed doubles	(Indonesia) Nova Widianto and Liliyana Natsir	(Thailand) Sudket Prapakamol and Saralee Thungthongkam	(China) Zhang Wei and Yu Yang
Mixed doubles	(Indonesia) Nova Widianto and Liliyana Natsir	(Thailand) Sudket Prapakamol and Saralee Thungthongkam	(Singapore) Hendri Kurniawan Saputra and Li Yujia

== Medal count ==
Pos	Country	Gold	Silver	Bronze	Total
1	Malaysia	2	1	1	4
2	China	1	0	5	6
3	Indonesia	1	0	1	2
4	Hong Kong	1	0	0	1
5	Thailand	0	2	0	2
6	Japan	0	1	0	1
6	Chinese Taipei	0	1	0	1
8	South Korea	0	0	2	2
9	Singapore	0	0	1	1

== Final results ==
=== Men's singles ===
Semi-finals
(Malaysia) Lee Chong Wei	21	21
(South Korea) Park Sung-hwan	15	15
(China) Chen Yu	22	13
(Thailand) Boonsak Ponsana	24	21

Final
(Malaysia) Lee Chong Wei	21	21
(Thailand) Boonsak Ponsana	12	16

=== Women's singles ===
Semi-finals
(Hong Kong) Wang Chen	21	21
(China) Jiang Yanjiao	17	18
(China) Chen Li	17	19
(Japan) Kaori Mori	21	21

Final
(Hong Kong) Wang Chen	21	9	21
(Japan) Kaori Mori	14	21	13

=== Men's doubles ===
Semi-finals
(Malaysia) Choong Tan Fook (Malaysia) Lee Wan Wah	21	18	21
(Indonesia) Luluk Hadiyanto (Indonesia) Alvent Yulianto	14	21	15
(Malaysia) Hoon Thien How (Malaysia) Tan Boon Heong	21	21
(South Korea) Hwang Ji-man (South Korea) Jung Tae-keuk	19	18

Final
(Malaysia) Choong Tan Fook (Malaysia) Lee Wan Wah	17	21	21
(Malaysia) Hoon Thien How (Malaysia) Tan Boon Heong	21	11	12

=== Women's doubles ===
Semi-finals
(Chinese Taipei) Cheng Wen-hsing (Chinese Taipei) Chien Yu-chin	21	21
(Malaysia) Joanne Quay (Malaysia) Lim Pek Siah	9	15
(China) Du Jing (China) Yu Yang	w	/	o
(China) Pan Pan (China) Tian Qing

Final
(Chinese Taipei) Cheng Wen-hsing (Chinese Taipei) Chien Yu-chin	11	16
(China) Du Jing (China) Yu Yang	21	21

=== Mixed doubles ===
Semi-finals
(Indonesia) Nova Widianto (Indonesia) Liliyana Natsir	21	21
(China) Zhang Wei (China) Yu Yang	9	9
(Singapore) Hendri Kurniawan Saputra (Singapore) Li Yujia	21	19	9
(Thailand) Sudket Prapakamol (Thailand) Saralee Thungthongkam	14	21	21

Final
(Indonesia) Nova Widianto (Indonesia) Liliyana Natsir	21	21	21
(Thailand) Sudket Prapakamol (Thailand) Saralee Thungthongkam	16	23	14
