= Badminton at the 2010 Asian Games – Women's doubles =

2010 Asian Games Badminton event

Women's doubles at the 2010 Asian Games
- Venue: Tianhe Gymnasium
- Dates: 16–19 November
- Competitors: 46 from 13 nations

Medalists
gold medal	Tian Qing; Zhao Yunlei	China
silver medal	Wang Xiaoli; Yu Yang	China
bronze medal	Ha Jung-eun; Lee Kyung-won	South Korea
bronze medal	Kim Min-jung; Lee Hyo-jung	South Korea

The badminton women's doubles tournament at the 2010 Asian Games in Guangzhou took place from 16 November to 19 November at Tianhe Gymnasium.

== Schedule ==
All times are China Standard Time (UTC+08:00)

Date	Time	Event
Tuesday, 16 November 2010	09:00	Round of 32
Tuesday, 16 November 2010	19:00	Round of 16
Wednesday, 17 November 2010	19:00	Quarterfinals
Thursday, 18 November 2010	20:00	Semifinals
Friday, 19 November 2010	21:45	Final

== Results ==
Legend

- r — Retired
- WO — Won by walkover

=== Final ===
Final
5	Wang Xiaoli (CHN); Yu Yang (CHN)	22	15	12
2	Tian Qing (CHN); Zhao Yunlei (CHN)	20	21	21

=== Top half ===
Round of 32
Shendy Puspa Irawati (INA); Nitya Krishinda Maheswari (INA)	21	15	21
Poon Lok Yan (HKG); Tse Ying Suet (HKG)	16	21	18
Duanganong Aroonkesorn (THA); Kunchala Voravichitchaikul (THA)	21	21
Thilini Jayasinghe (SRI); Subodha Dahanayake (SRI)	5	9
Aparna Balan (IND); Prajakta Sawant (IND)	17	7
Marylen Ng (MAS); Woon Khe Wei (MAS)	21	21

Round of 16
1	Cheng Wen-hsing (TPE); Chien Yu-chin (TPE)	W	O
Zhang Dan (MAC); Zhang Zhibo (MAC)
5	Wang Xiaoli (CHN); Yu Yang (CHN)	21	21
Shendy Puspa Irawati (INA); Nitya Krishinda Maheswari (INA)	10	11
3	Miyuki Maeda (JPN); Satoko Suetsuna (JPN)	21	21
Duanganong Aroonkesorn (THA); Kunchala Voravichitchaikul (THA)	14	17
8	Ha Jung-eun (KOR); Lee Kyung-won (KOR)	21	21
Marylen Ng (MAS); Woon Khe Wei (MAS)	8	15

Quarterfinals
1	Cheng Wen-hsing (TPE); Chien Yu-chin (TPE)	18	16
5	Wang Xiaoli (CHN); Yu Yang (CHN)	21	21
3	Miyuki Maeda (JPN); Satoko Suetsuna (JPN)	21	19	18
8	Ha Jung-eun (KOR); Lee Kyung-won (KOR)	13	21	21

Semifinals
5	Wang Xiaoli (CHN); Yu Yang (CHN)	21	21
8	Ha Jung-eun (KOR); Lee Kyung-won (KOR)	17	14

=== Bottom half ===
Round of 32
Chan Tsz Ka (HKG); Chau Hoi Wah (HKG)	14	15
Hsieh Pei-chen (TPE); Wang Pei-rong (TPE)	21	21
Sujana Shrestha (NEP); Sara Devi Tamang (NEP)	3	4
Kim Min-jung (KOR); Lee Hyo-jung (KOR)	21	21
Long Ying (MAC); Mak Ka Lei (MAC)	9	12
Vivian Hoo (MAS); Lim Yin Loo (MAS)	21	21
Jwala Gutta (IND); Ashwini Ponnappa (IND)	21
Savitree Amitrapai (THA); Punyada Munkitchokecharoen (THA)	13	r

Round of 16
Hsieh Pei-chen (TPE); Wang Pei-rong (TPE)	21	21
7	Meiliana Jauhari (INA); Greysia Polii (INA)	19	18
Kim Min-jung (KOR); Lee Hyo-jung (KOR)	21	21
4	Mizuki Fujii (JPN); Reika Kakiiwa (JPN)	14	15
Vivian Hoo (MAS); Lim Yin Loo (MAS)	16	16
6	Shinta Mulia Sari (SIN); Yao Lei (SIN)	21	21
Jwala Gutta (IND); Ashwini Ponnappa (IND)	10	5
2	Tian Qing (CHN); Zhao Yunlei (CHN)	21	21

Quarterfinals
Hsieh Pei-chen (TPE); Wang Pei-rong (TPE)	17	9
Kim Min-jung (KOR); Lee Hyo-jung (KOR)	21	21
6	Shinta Mulia Sari (SIN); Yao Lei (SIN)	8	11
2	Tian Qing (CHN); Zhao Yunlei (CHN)	21	21

Semifinals
Kim Min-jung (KOR); Lee Hyo-jung (KOR)	9	12
2	Tian Qing (CHN); Zhao Yunlei (CHN)	21	21
