= 2010 BWF World Championships – Mixed doubles =

Mixed Doubles at the 2010 BWF World Championships
- Venue: Stade Pierre de Coubertin
- Location: Paris, France
- Dates: August 23, 2010 – August 29, 2010

Medalists
gold medal	Zheng Bo; Ma Jin	China
silver medal	He Hanbin; Yu Yang	China
bronze medal	Ko Sung-hyun; Ha Jung-eun	South Korea
bronze medal	Lee Sheng-mu; Chien Yu-chin	Chinese Taipei

The 2010 BWF World Championships was the 18th tournament of the World Badminton Championships. It was held at Stade Pierre de Coubertin in Paris, France, from August 23 to August 29, 2010. Following the results of the mixed doubles.

== Seeds ==
1. (Indonesia) Nova Widianto / Lilyana Natsir (quarterfinals)
2. (Denmark) Thomas Laybourn / Kamilla Rytter Juhl (quarterfinals)
3. (Poland) Robert Mateusiak / Nadieżda Kostiuczyk (second round)
4. (Indonesia) Hendra Aprida Gunawan / Vita Marissa (third round)
5. (Denmark) Joachim Fischer Nielsen / Christinna Pedersen (third round)
6. (China) He Hanbin / Yu Yang (finalists)
7. (South Korea) Lee Yong-dae / Lee Hyo-jung (third round)
8. (China) Zheng Bo / Ma Jin (champions)
9. (India) Valiyaveetil Diju / Jwala Gutta (quarterfinals)
10. (China) Tao Jiaming / Zhang Yawen (quarterfinals)
11. (Chinese Taipei) Chen Hung-ling / Chou Chia-chi (second round)
12. (South Korea) Ko Sung-hyun / Ha Jung-eun (semifinals)
13. (Thailand) Songphon Anugritayawon / Kunchala Voravichitchaikul (third round)
14. (Thailand) Sudket Prapakamol / Saralee Thungthongkam (third round)
15. (England) Nathan Robertson / Jenny Wallwork (third round)
16. (Chinese Taipei) Lee Sheng-mu / Chien Yu-chin (semifinals)

== Main stage ==
=== Section 1 ===
First round
11	(Chinese Taipei) Chen H-l (Chinese Taipei) Chou C-c	21	21
(Germany) J Schöttler (Germany) S Marinello	13	14
(Australia) Ra Veeran (Australia) Re Veeran	14	13
(South Korea) Yoo Y-s (South Korea) Kim M-j	21	21
14	(Thailand) S Prapakamol (Thailand) S Thoungthongkam	23	23
(Croatia) Z Durkinjak (Croatia) S Poznanovic	21	21
(Hong Kong) Wong WH (Hong Kong) Chau HW	21	21
(Republic of Ireland) S Magee (Republic of Ireland) C Magee	17	16

Second round
1	(Indonesia) N Widianto (Indonesia) L Natsir	21	21
(Indonesia) F Kurniawan (Indonesia) P Zebadiah	15	14
11	(Chinese Taipei) Chen H-l (Chinese Taipei) Chou C-c	12	21	22
(South Korea) Yoo Y-s (South Korea) Kim M-j	21	18	24
8	(China) Zheng B (China) Ma J	21	21
(Ukraine) D Zavadsky (Ukraine) M Diptan	7	9
14	(Thailand) S Prapakamol (Thailand) S Thoungthongkam	22	21
(Hong Kong) Wong WH (Hong Kong) Chau HW	20	11

Third round
1	(Indonesia) N Widianto (Indonesia) L Natsir	21	13	21
(South Korea) Yoo Y-s (South Korea) Kim M-j	17	21	19
8	(China) Zheng B (China) Ma J	21	21
14	(Thailand) S Prapakamol (Thailand) S Thoungthongkam	19	15

Quarterfinals
1	(Indonesia) N Widianto (Indonesia) L Natsir	19	21
8	(China) Zheng B (China) Ma J	21	23

=== Section 2 ===
First round
9	(India) V Diju (India) J Gutta	21	14	21
(England) C Adcock (England) G White	6	21	8
(Malaysia) Chan PS (Malaysia) Goh LY	21	21
(Belgium) J Gillis (Belgium) S Corvilain	12	14
12	(South Korea) Ko S-h (South Korea) Ha J-e	21	21
(Switzerland) A Dumartheray (Switzerland) S Jaquet	11	16
(France) B Careme (France) L Choinet	15	15
(Japan) H Hashimoto (Japan) M Fujii	21	21

Second round
3	(Poland) R Mateusiak (Poland) N Zieba	13	21	14
(Singapore) C Triyachart (Singapore) Yao L	21	16	21
9	(India) V Diju (India) J Gutta	21	21
(Malaysia) Chan PS (Malaysia) Goh LY	19	8
5	(Denmark) J Fischer Nielsen (Denmark) C Pedersen	21	21
(Russia) A Nikolaenko (Russia) V Sorokina	15	19
12	(South Korea) Ko S-h (South Korea) Ha J-e	21	21
(Japan) H Hashimoto (Japan) M Fujii	16	16

Third round
(Singapore) C Triyachart (Singapore) Yao L	21	18	14
9	(India) V Diju (India) J Gutta	14	21	21
5	(Denmark) J Fischer Nielsen (Denmark) C Pedersen	13	21	19
12	(South Korea) Ko S-h (South Korea) Ha J-e	21	13	21

Quarterfinals
9	(India) V Diju (India) J Gutta	16	19
12	(South Korea) Ko S-h (South Korea) Ha J-e	21	21

=== Section 3 ===
First round
(Vietnam) Duong BD (Vietnam) Thai THG	9	15
(Hong Kong) YH Wiratama (Hong Kong) Tse YS	21	21
(Russia) V Durkin (Russia) N Vislova	22	14	16
16	(Chinese Taipei) Lee S-m (Chinese Taipei) Chien Y-c	20	21	21
(Canada) T Ng (Canada) G Gao	8	16
(Japan) N Hirata (Japan) M Maeda	21	21
(France) R Labar (France) W Rasidi	17	16
10	(China) Tao JM (China) Zhang YW	21	21

Second round
(Hong Kong) YH Wiratama (Hong Kong) Tse YS	21	15	15
16	(Chinese Taipei) Lee S-m (Chinese Taipei) Chien Y-c	17	21	21
(Denmark) M Delbo Larsen (Denmark) M Schjott-Kristensen	15	9
7	(South Korea) Lee Y-d (South Korea) Lee H-j	21	21
(Japan) N Hirata (Japan) M Maeda	21	6
10	(China) Tao JM (China) Zhang YW	23	21
(South Africa) D James (South Africa) M Edwards	21	10	9
4	(Indonesia) HA Gunawan (Indonesia) V Marissa	16	21	21

Third round
16	(Chinese Taipei) Lee S-m (Chinese Taipei) Chien Y-c	21	22
7	(South Korea) Lee Y-d (South Korea) Lee H-j	17	20
10	(China) Tao JM (China) Zhang YW	21	15
4	(Indonesia) HA Gunawan (Indonesia) V Marissa	16	10^{r}

Quarterfinals
16	(Chinese Taipei) Lee S-m (Chinese Taipei) Chien Y-c	14	21	21
10	(China) Tao JM (China) Zhang YW	21	18	17

=== Section 4 ===
First round
(Israel) M Zilberman (Israel) S Zilberman	9	14
(Austria) R Zirnwald (Austria) S Prutsch	21	21
(Germany) I Kindervater (Germany) B Overzier	17	20
13	(Thailand) S Anugritayawon (Thailand) K Voravichitchaikul	21	22
(Bulgaria) S Makarski (Bulgaria) D Dimova	14	21	21
(Netherlands) D Khodabux (Netherlands) S Barning	21	11	19
(Ukraine) V Atrashchenkov (Ukraine) E Prus	16	15
15	(England) N Robertson (England) J Wallwork	21	21

Second round
(Austria) R Zirnwald (Austria) S Prutsch	15	12
13	(Thailand) S Anugritayawon (Thailand) K Voravichitchaikul	21	21
(Spain) C Longo (Spain) H Ojeda	5	5
6	(China) He HB (China) Yu Y	21	21
(Bulgaria) S Makarski (Bulgaria) D Dimova	9	12
15	(England) N Robertson (England) J Wallwork	21	21
(Poland) W Szkudlarczyk (Poland) A Wojtkowska	15	17
2	(Denmark) T Laybourn (Denmark) K Rytter Juhl	21	21

Third round
13	(Thailand) S Anugritayawon (Thailand) K Voravichitchaikul	14	13
6	(China) He HB (China) Yu Y	21	21
15	(England) N Robertson (England) J Wallwork	22	12	18
2	(Denmark) T Laybourn (Denmark) K Rytter Juhl	20	21	21

Quarterfinals
6	(China) He HB (China) Yu Y	21	21
2	(Denmark) T Laybourn (Denmark) K Rytter Juhl	19	17

== Final stage ==
Quarterfinals
1	(Indonesia) Nova Widianto (Indonesia) Lilyana Natsir	19	21
8	(China) Zheng Bo (China) Ma Jin	21	23
9	(India) Valiyaveetil Diju (India) Jwala Gutta	16	19
12	(South Korea) Ko Sung-hyun (South Korea) Ha Jung-eun	21	21
16	(Chinese Taipei) Lee Sheng-mu (Chinese Taipei) Chien Yu-chin	14	21	21
10	(China) Tao Jiaming (China) Zhang Yawen	21	18	17
6	(China) He Hanbin (China) Yu Yang	21	21
2	(Denmark) Thomas Laybourn (Denmark) Kamilla Rytter Juhl	19	17

Semifinals
8	(China) Zheng Bo (China) Ma Jin	15	21	21
12	(South Korea) Ko Sung-hyun (South Korea) Ha Jung-eun	21	11	16
16	(Chinese Taipei) Lee S-m (Chinese Taipei) Chien Yu-chin	13	8
6	(China) He Hanbin (China) Yu Yang	21	21

Finals
8	(China) Zheng Bo (China) Ma Jin	21	21
6	(China) He Hanbin (China) Yu Yang	14	10
