= Tian Qing =

Chinese badminton player (born 1986)

Tian Qing 田卿
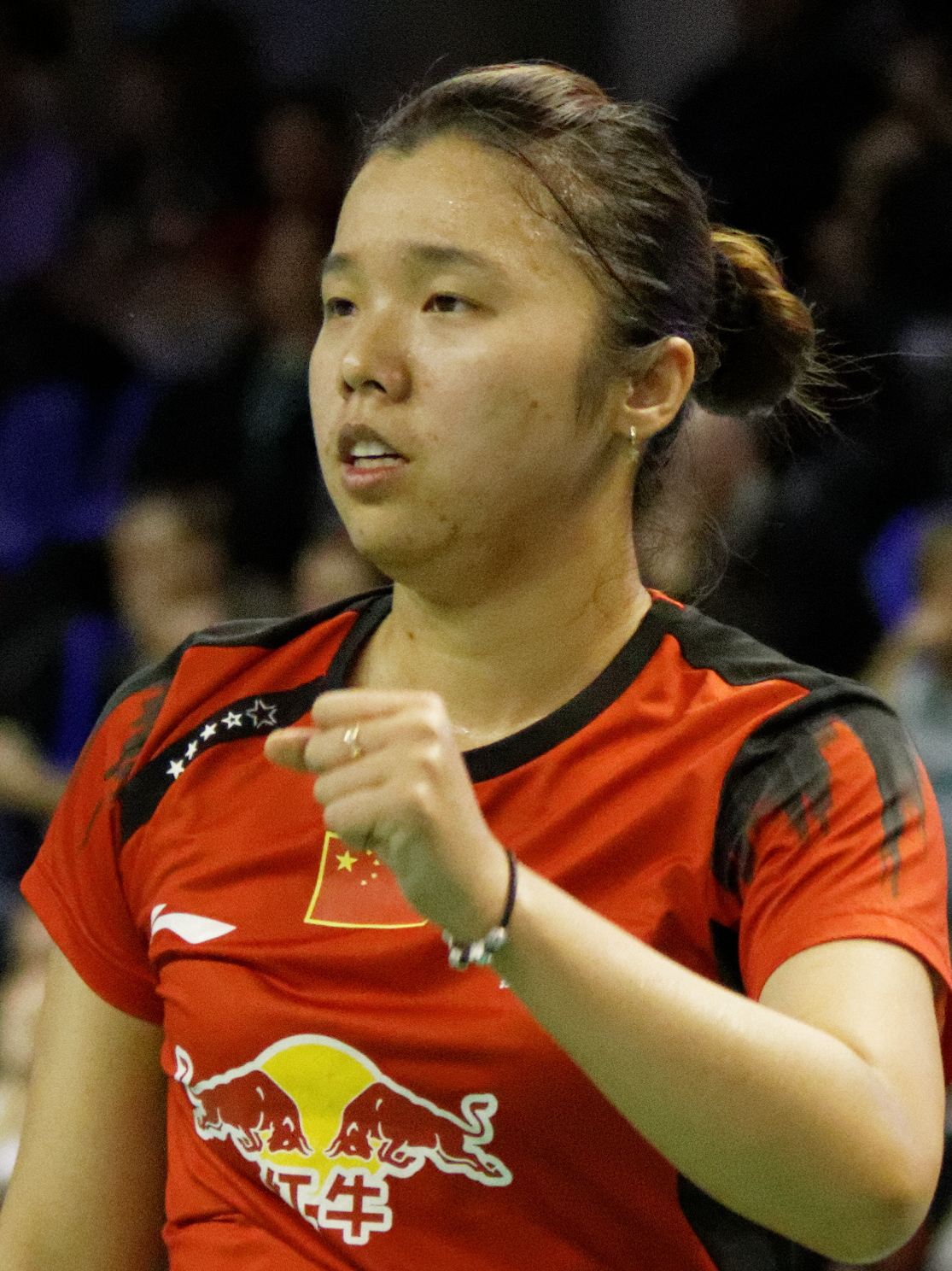
- Tian at the 2013 French Open

Personal information
- Born: 19 August 1986 (age 40) Anhua, Yiyang, China
- Height: 1.68 m (5 ft 6 in)
- Weight: 62 kg (137 lb)
- Spouse: Zhang Nan (m. 2018)

Sport
- Country: China
- Sport: Badminton
- Handedness: Right
- Coached by: Chen Qiqiu

Women's & mixed doubles
- Highest ranking: 1 (WD with Zhao Yunlei, 20 September 2012); 2 (XD with Tao Jiaming, 18 August 2011)
- BWF profile
Medal record
Women's badminton
Representing China
Olympic Games
| Gold medal – first place | 2012 London | Women's doubles |
World Championships
| Gold medal – first place | 2014 Copenhagen | Women's doubles |
| Gold medal – first place | 2015 Jakarta | Women's doubles |
| Silver medal – second place | 2011 London | Women's doubles |
| Bronze medal – third place | 2013 Guangzhou | Women's doubles |
Sudirman Cup
| Gold medal – first place | 2009 Guangzhou | Mixed team |
| Gold medal – first place | 2011 Qingdao | Mixed team |
| Gold medal – first place | 2013 Kuala Lumpur | Mixed team |
Uber Cup
| Gold medal – first place | 2012 Wuhan | Women's team |
| Gold medal – first place | 2014 New Delhi | Women's team |
| Gold medal – first place | 2016 Kunshan | Women's team |
| Silver medal – second place | 2010 Kuala Lumpur | Women's team |
Asian Games
| Gold medal – first place | 2010 Guangzhou | Women's doubles |
| Gold medal – first place | 2010 Guangzhou | Women's team |
| Gold medal – first place | 2014 Incheon | Women's team |
| Bronze medal – third place | 2014 Incheon | Women's doubles |
Asian Championships
| Gold medal – first place | 2010 New Delhi | Women's doubles |
| Gold medal – first place | 2012 Qingdao | Women's doubles |
| Silver medal – second place | 2011 Chengdu | Women's doubles |
| Bronze medal – third place | 2006 Johor Bahru | Women's doubles |
| Bronze medal – third place | 2010 New Delhi | Mixed doubles |
Asia Team Championships
| Gold medal – first place | 2016 Hyderabad | Women's team |
Summer Universiade
| Silver medal – second place | 2007 Bangkok | Women's doubles |
| Silver medal – second place | 2007 Bangkok | Mixed team |
| Silver medal – second place | 2013 Kazan | Women's doubles |
| Silver medal – second place | 2013 Kazan | Mixed doubles |
| Silver medal – second place | 2013 Kazan | Mixed team |
World Junior Championships
| Gold medal – first place | 2004 Richmond | Girls' doubles |
| Gold medal – first place | 2004 Richmond | Mixed team |

Tian Qing (Chinese: 田卿; pinyin: Tián Qīng; born 19 August 1986) is a Chinese badminton player specializing in doubles.

== Career ==
Tian Qing started to practice badminton with her father Tian Jianyi who also a badminton coach in Anhua Sports School at aged 7. In 1998, she moved to Hunan Province Sports School and in 2004, she competed at the World Junior Championships and win gold in the girls' doubles event teamed-up with Yu Yang. In 2006, she joined the national team. In her early career at the national team, she was partnered with Pan Pan, and they participated in the 2009 World Championships, and 2010 Uber Cup.

In 2010, she competed at the 2010 Guangzhou Asian Games in the mixed team and women's doubles event partnered with Zhao Yunlei, where she won two gold medals respectively. At the same year, she also competed in the mixed doubles event partnered with Tao Jiaming, and they were won the titles at the China Masters and China Open. She also won the women's doubles title at the Swiss Open with Yu Yang and a gold medal at the Asia Championships with Pan Pan. In 2011, she set to teamed-up with Zhao Yunlei, and they managed to win the women's doubles title at the Malaysia and Singapore Open. They also won silver medal at the 2011 BWF World Championships and ensure to compete at the 2012 London Olympics.

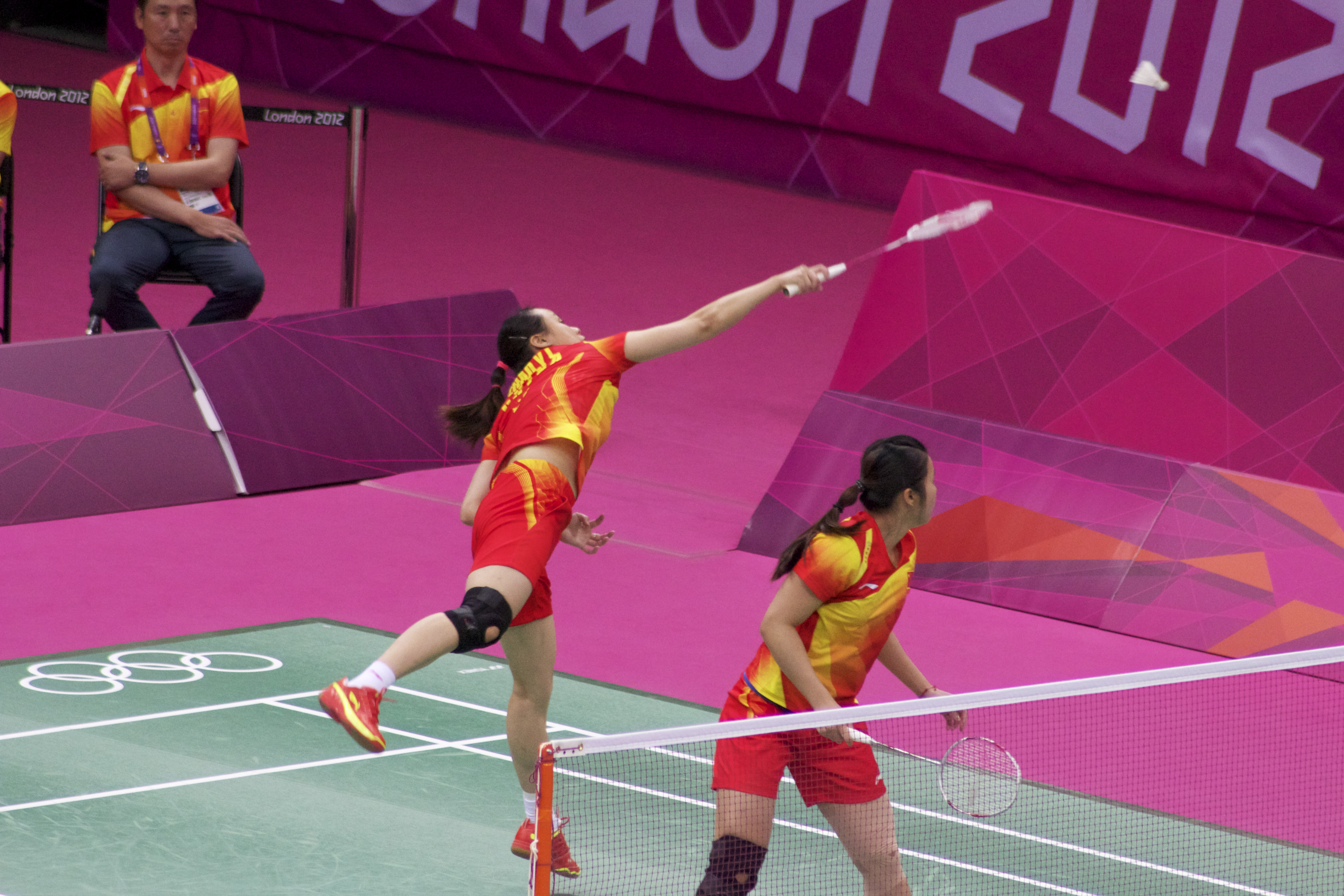
Tian Qing and Zhao Yunlei at the 2012 Summer Olympics

In London 2012, she and Zhao won the women's doubles gold after outplayed Mizuki Fujii and Reika Kakiiwa in the final. Compete as the number 2 seed, they can reach the knock-uot stage after place second in the group stage lose a match to Danish pair Christinna Pedersen and Kamilla Rytter Juhl. They also won the women's doubles title in Korea, All England, and Hong Kong Open.

In 2013, she won the women's doubles title at the Malaysia Open teamed-up with Bao Yixin. She also won the Singapore Open and became the runner-up at the French Open with Zhao Yunlei. In 2014, she and Zhao won the Superseries Premier title at the Indonesia Open. They won the title without even having to hold a racket in the final round, following their opponent Ma Jin withdrew from the match after suffered an injury. In August 2014, she and Zhao won the gold medal at the World Championships in Copenhagen after beat their compatriots Wang Xiaoli and Yu Yang. At the end of the 2014 BWF Superseries, they qualified to compete at the Dubai World Superseries Finals. They finally became the runner-up after lose to Japanese pair Misaki Matsutomo and Ayaka Takahashi in the final.

In 2015, she defend her title at the Indonesia Open with different partner (Tang Jinhua). She also defended her title at the Hong Kong Open and World Championships with Zhao Yunlei. In 2016, Tian who ranked No. 3 in the world partnered with Zhao Yunlei, was not listed on the player rooster to compete at the 2016 Rio Olympics. Their names replaced by Luo Ying and Luo Yu who are currently ranked No. 7. Zhao who plays in two sectors and the match schedule into consideration to Chinese Olympic Committee. In September 2016, she reported her retirement in the Chinese Press.

== Personal life ==
Tian is married to Zhang Nan in November 2018.

== Achievements ==
=== Olympic Games ===
Women's doubles
| Year | Venue | Partner | Opponent | Score | Result |
|---|---|---|---|---|---|
| 2012 | Wembley Arena, London, Great Britain | (China) Zhao Yunlei | (Japan) Mizuki Fujii (Japan) Reika Kakiiwa | 21–10, 25–23 | Gold |

=== BWF World Championships ===
Women's doubles
| Year | Venue | Partner | Opponent | Score | Result |
|---|---|---|---|---|---|
| 2011 | Wembley Arena, London, England | (China) Zhao Yunlei | (China) Wang Xiaoli (China) Yu Yang | 20–22, 11–21 | Silver |
| 2013 | Tianhe Sports Center, Guangzhou, China | (China) Zhao Yunlei | (South Korea) Chang Ye-na (South Korea) Eom Hye-won | 16–21, 19–21 | Bronze |
| 2014 | Ballerup Super Arena, Copenhagen, Denmark | (China) Zhao Yunlei | (China) Wang Xiaoli (China) Yu Yang | 21–19, 21–15 | Gold |
| 2015 | Istora Gelora Bung Karno, Jakarta, Indonesia | (China) Zhao Yunlei | (Denmark) Christinna Pedersen (Denmark) Kamilla Rytter Juhl | 23–25, 21–8, 21–15 | Gold |

=== Asian Games ===
Women's doubles
| Year | Venue | Partner | Opponent | Score | Result |
|---|---|---|---|---|---|
| 2010 | Tianhe Gymnasium, Guangzhou, China | (China) Zhao Yunlei | (China) Wang Xiaoli (China) Yu Yang | 20–22, 21–15, 21–12 | Gold |
| 2014 | Gyeyang Gymnasium, Incheon, South Korea | (China) Zhao Yunlei | (Indonesia) Nitya Krishinda Maheswari (Indonesia) Greysia Polii | 17–21, 21–19, 17–21 | Bronze |

=== Asian Championships ===
Women's doubles
| Year | Venue | Partner | Opponent | Score | Result |
|---|---|---|---|---|---|
| 2006 | Bandaraya Stadium, Johor Bahru, Malaysia | (China) Pan Pan | (China) Du Jing (China) Yu Yang | Walkover | Bronze |
| 2010 | Siri Fort Indoor Stadium, New Delhi, India | (China) Pan Pan | (Malaysia) Vivian Hoo (Malaysia) Woon Khe Wei | 21–10, 21–6 | Gold |
| 2011 | Sichuan Gymnasium, Chengdu, China | (China) Zhao Yunlei | (China) Wang Xiaoli (China) Yu Yang | 13–21, 10–21 | Silver |
| 2012 | Qingdao Sports Centre Conson Stadium, Qingdao, China | (China) Zhao Yunlei | (China) Bao Yixin (China) Zhong Qianxin | 21–14, 21–15 | Gold |

Mixed doubles
| Year | Venue | Partner | Opponent | Score | Result |
|---|---|---|---|---|---|
| 2010 | Siri Fort Indoor Stadium, New Delhi, India | (China) Qiu Zihan | (South Korea) Yoo Yeon-seong (South Korea) Kim Min-jung | 22–24, 21–13, 11–21 | Bronze |

=== Summer Universiade ===
Women's doubles
| Year | Venue | Partner | Opponent | Score | Result |
|---|---|---|---|---|---|
| 2007 | Thammasat University, Pathum Thani, Thailand | (China) Pan Pan | (Chinese Taipei) Cheng Wen-hsing (Chinese Taipei) Chien Yu-chin | 9–21, 13–21 | Silver |
| 2013 | Tennis Academy, Kazan, Russia | (China) Luo Yu | (South Korea) Jang Ye-na (South Korea) Kim So-young | 25–27, 21–15, 21–23 | Silver |

Mixed doubles
| Year | Venue | Partner | Opponent | Score | Result |
|---|---|---|---|---|---|
| 2013 | Tennis Academy, Kazan, Russia | (China) Liu Cheng | (South Korea) Kim Gi-jung (South Korea) Kim So-young | 20–22, 14–21 | Silver |

=== World Junior Championships ===
Girls' doubles
| Year | Venue | Partner | Opponent | Score | Result |
|---|---|---|---|---|---|
| 2004 | Minoru Arena, Richmond, Canada | (China) Yu Yang | (China) Feng Chen (China) Pan Pan | 15–3, 15–5 | Gold |

=== BWF Superseries (16 titles, 13 runners-up) ===
The BWF Superseries, which was launched on 14 December 2006 and implemented in 2007, is a series of elite badminton tournaments, sanctioned by the Badminton World Federation (BWF). BWF Superseries levels are Superseries and Superseries Premier. A season of Superseries consists of twelve tournaments around the world that have been introduced since 2011. Successful players are invited to the Superseries Finals, which are held at the end of each year.

Women's doubles
| Year | Tournament | Partner | Opponent | Score | Result |
|---|---|---|---|---|---|
| 2009 | China Open | (China) Zhang Yawen | (China) Du Jing (China) Yu Yang | 21–14, 21–14 | (gold) Winner |
| 2010 | Swiss Open | (China) Yu Yang | (Japan) Miyuki Maeda (Japan) Satoko Suetsuna | 21–16, 21–13 | (gold) Winner |
| 2011 | Malaysia Open | (China) Zhao Yunlei | (China) Wang Xiaoli (China) Yu Yang | 21–12, 6–21, 21–17 | (gold) Winner |
| 2011 | Korea Open | (China) Zhao Yunlei | (China) Wang Xiaoli (China) Yu Yang | 18–21, 21–19, 4–21 | (silver) Runner-up |
| 2011 | Singapore Open | (China) Zhao Yunlei | (South Korea) Ha Jung-eun (South Korea) Kim Min-jung | 21–13, 21–16 | (gold) Winner |
| 2011 | Denmark Open | (China) Zhao Yunlei | (China) Wang Xiaoli (China) Yu Yang | 20–22, 16–21 | (silver) Runner-up |
| 2011 | French Open | (China) Zhao Yunlei | (China) Wang Xiaoli (China) Yu Yang | 24–26, 15–21 | (silver) Runner-up |
| 2011 | Hong Kong Open | (China) Zhao Yunlei | (China) Wang Xiaoli (China) Yu Yang | 12–21, 2–14 retired | (silver) Runner-up |
| 2012 | Korea Open | (China) Zhao Yunlei | (South Korea) Ha Jung-eun (South Korea) Kim Min-jung | 21–18, 21–13 | (gold) Winner |
| 2012 | All England Open | (China) Zhao Yunlei | (China) Wang Xiaoli (China) Yu Yang | 21–17, 21–12 | (gold) Winner |
| 2012 | Indonesia Open | (China) Zhao Yunlei | (China) Wang Xiaoli (China) Yu Yang | 21–17, 9–21, 16–21 | (silver) Runner-up |
| 2012 | Hong Kong Open | (China) Zhao Yunlei | (China) Wang Xiaoli (China) Yu Yang | 22–20, 14–21, 21–17 | (gold) Winner |
| 2013 | Malaysia Open | (China) Bao Yixin | (Japan) Misaki Matsutomo (Japan) Ayaka Takahashi | 21–16, 21–14 | (gold) Winner |
| 2013 | Singapore Open | (China) Zhao Yunlei | (Japan) Misaki Matsutomo (Japan) Ayaka Takahashi | 21–19, 21–16 | (gold) Winner |
| 2013 | French Open | (China) Zhao Yunlei | (China) Bao Yixin (China) Tang Jinhua | 13–21, 17–21 | (silver) Runner-up |
| 2014 | Indonesia Open | (China) Zhao Yunlei | (China) Ma Jin (China) Tang Yuanting | Walkover | (gold) Winner |
| 2014 | Australian Open | (China) Zhao Yunlei | (Japan) Misaki Matsutomo (Japan) Ayaka Takahashi | 21–15, 21–9 | (gold) Winner |
| 2014 | China Open | (China) Zhao Yunlei | (China) Wang Xiaoli (China) Yu Yang | 16–21, 21–19, 20–22 | (silver) Runner-up |
| 2014 | Hong Kong Open | (China) Zhao Yunlei | (Japan) Misaki Matsutomo (Japan) Ayaka Takahashi | 21–13, 21–13 | (gold) Winner |
| 2014 | Dubai World Superseries Finals | (China) Zhao Yunlei | (Japan) Misaki Matsutomo (Japan) Ayaka Takahashi | 17–21, 14–21 | (silver) Runner-up |
| 2015 | Australian Open | (China) Tang Jinhua | (China) Ma Jin (China) Tang Yuanting | 19–21, 21–16, 20–22 | (silver) Runner-up |
| 2015 | Indonesia Open | (China) Tang Jinhua | (Indonesia) Nitya Krishinda Maheswari (Indonesia) Greysia Polii | 21–11, 21–10 | (gold) Winner |
| 2015 | Denmark Open | (China) Zhao Yunlei | (South Korea) Jung Kyung-eun (South Korea) Shin Seung-chan | Walkover | (silver) Runner-up |
| 2015 | Hong Kong Open | (China) Zhao Yunlei | (China) Tang Yuanting (China) Yu Yang | 21–15, 21–12 | (gold) Winner |

Mixed doubles
| Year | Tournament | Partner | Opponent | Score | Result |
|---|---|---|---|---|---|
| 2010 | China Masters | (China) Tao Jiaming | (China) Xu Chen (China) Yu Yang | 21–11, 21–14 | (gold) Winner |
| 2010 | Japan Open | (China) Tao Jiaming | (China) Zhang Nan (China) Zhao Yunlei | 19–21, 20–22 | (silver) Runner-up |
| 2010 | China Open | (China) Tao Jiaming | (China) Zhang Nan (China) Zhao Yunlei | 21–18, 21–17 | (gold) Winner |
| 2011 | Malaysia Open | (China) Tao Jiaming | (China) He Hanbin (China) Ma Jin | 13–21, 21–13, 16–21 | (silver) Runner-up |
| 2011 | Korea Open | (China) Tao Jiaming | (China) Zhang Nan (China) Zhao Yunlei | 17–21, 21–13, 19–21 | (silver) Runner-up |

BWF Super Series Finals tournament
BWF Super Series Premier tournament
BWF Super Series tournament

=== BWF Grand Prix (3 titles, 2 runners-up) ===
The BWF Grand Prix had two levels, the BWF Grand Prix and Grand Prix Gold. It was a series of badminton tournaments sanctioned by the Badminton World Federation (BWF) which was held from 2007 to 2017.

Women's doubles
| Year | Tournament | Partner | Opponent | Score | Result |
|---|---|---|---|---|---|
| 2007 | Philippines Open | (China) Pan Pan | (Chinese Taipei) Cheng Wen-hsing (Chinese Taipei) Chien Yu-chin | 20–22, 14–21 | (silver) Runner-up |
| 2009 | German Open | (China) Pan Pan | (China) Cheng Shu (China) Zhao Yunlei | 21–18, 13–21, 16–21 | (silver) Runner-up |
| 2010 | Bitburger Open | (China) Pan Pan | (Netherlands) Lotte Bruil-Jonathans (Netherlands) Pauline van Dooremalen | 21–7, 21–10 | (gold) Winner |
| 2011 | Thailand Open | (China) Zhao Yunlei | (China) Bao Yixin (China) Cheng Shu | 21–7, 21–8 | (gold) Winner |
| 2016 | Thailand Masters | (China) Zhao Yunlei | (China) Tang Yuanting (China) Yu Yang | 11–21, 21–12, 23–21 | (gold) Winner |

BWF Grand Prix Gold tournament
BWF Grand Prix tournament

=== BWF International Challenge/Series (1 runners-up) ===
Women's doubles
| Year | Tournament | Partner | Opponent | Score | Result |
|---|---|---|---|---|---|
| 2007 | Austrian International | (China) Pan Pan | (China) Cheng Shu (China) Zhao Yunlei | 18–21, 13–21 | (silver) Runner-up |

BWF International Challenge tournament
BWF International Series tournament
