= Feng Chen (badminton) =

Chinese badminton player

Feng Chen 冯晨
Personal information
- Born: 29 August 1987 (age 39) Hubei, China

Sport
- Country: China
- Sport: Badminton
- Event: Women's & mixed doubles

Women's & mixed doubles
- BWF profile
Medal record
Women's badminton
Representing China
World Junior Championships
Gold medal – first place	2004 Richmond	Mixed team
Silver medal – second place	2004 Richmond	Girls' doubles
Asian Junior Championships
Gold medal – first place	2004 Hwacheon	Mixed doubles
Gold medal – first place	2004 Hwacheon	Girls' team
Gold medal – first place	2002 Kuala Lumpur	Girls' team
Silver medal – second place	2004 Hwacheon	Girls' doubles

Feng Chen (Chinese: 冯晨; pinyin: Féng Chén; born 29 August 1987) is a retired Chinese badminton player. She was selected to join the Chinese junior team competed at the 2002 and 2004 Asian Junior Championships, and has collected 2 gold medals from the girls' team event, a gold in the mixed doubles, and a silver in the girls' doubles. Feng then won the mixed team gold medal at the 2004 World Junior Championships, and also clinched the silver medal in the girls' doubles event. In the senior international level, she was the runners-up at the 2004 French and Polish International tournaments. Feng also was the mixed doubles semifinalist at the World Grand Prix tournament, in 2005 China Masters partnered with He Hanbin. At the 2006 World University Championships in China University of Geosciences, Wuhan, she claimed three gold medals in the women's doubles, mixed doubles, and team event.

== Achievements ==
=== World Junior Championships ===
Girls' doubles
Year	Venue	Partner	Opponent	Score	Result
2004	Minoru Arena, Richmond, Canada	(China) Pan Pan	(China) Tian Qing (China) Yu Yang	3–15, 5–15	Silver

=== Asian Junior Championships ===
Girls' doubles
Year	Venue	Partner	Opponent	Score	Result
2004	Hwacheon Indoor Stadium, Hwacheon, South Korea	(China) Pan Pan	(China) Ding Jiao (China) Zhao Yunlei	15–5, 8–15, 12–15	Silver

Mixed doubles
Year	Venue	Partner	Opponent	Score	Result
2004	Hwacheon Indoor Stadium, Hwacheon, South Korea	(China) Shen Ye	(South Korea) Yoo Yeon-seong (South Korea) Ha Jung-eun	15–11, 15–6	Gold

=== IBF International ===
Women's doubles
Year	Tournament	Partner	Opponent	Score	Result
2004	Polish International	(China) Pan Pan	(China) Du Jing (China) Yu Yang	5–15, 6–15	(silver) Runner-up
2004	French International	(China) Pan Pan	(China) Du Jing (China) Yu Yang	15–5, 4–15, 6–15	(silver) Runner-up
