= Pan Pan (badminton) =

Chinese badminton player (born 1986)

Pan Pan 潘攀
Personal information
- Born: 27 April 1986 (age 40) Shijiazhuang, Hebei, China
- Height: 1.70 m (5 ft 7 in)
- Weight: 60 kg (132 lb)
- Spouse: Xu Chen (m. 2011)

Sport
- Country: China
- Sport: Badminton

Women's & mixed doubles
- Highest ranking: 5 (WD, 6 January 2011)
- BWF profile
Medal record
Women's badminton
Representing China
Sudirman Cup
Gold medal – first place	2011 Qingdao	Mixed team
Gold medal – first place	2009 Guangzhou	Mixed team
Uber Cup
Gold medal – first place	2012 Wuhan	Women's team
Silver medal – second place	2010 Kuala Lumpur	Women's team
Asian Championships
Gold medal – first place	2010 New Delhi	Women's doubles
Bronze medal – third place	2012 Qingdao	Women's doubles
Bronze medal – third place	2011 Chengdu	Mixed doubles
Bronze medal – third place	2006 Johor Bahru	Women's doubles
East Asian Games
Gold medal – first place	2009 Hong Kong	Women's team
Summer Universiade
Silver medal – second place	2007 Bangkok	Women's doubles
Silver medal – second place	2007 Bangkok	Mixed team
World Junior Championships
Gold medal – first place	2004 Richmond	Mixed team
Silver medal – second place	2004 Richmond	Girls' doubles
Asian Junior Championships
Gold medal – first place	2004 Hwacheon	Girls' team
Gold medal – first place	2002 Kuala Lumpur	Girls' team
Silver medal – second place	2004 Hwacheon	Girls' doubles
Bronze medal – third place	2004 Hwacheon	Mixed doubles

Pan Pan (Chinese: 潘攀; pinyin: Pān Pān; born 27 April 1986) is a retired Chinese professional badminton player. With her partner Tian Qing, they managed to reach the fifth position in the world rankings. She retired in 2012 to be an assistant coach in Chinese Badminton Association. She married Xu Chen in mid-2011.

== Achievements ==
=== Asian Championships ===
Women's doubles
Year	Venue	Partner	Opponent	Score	Result
2012	Qingdao Sports Centre Conson Stadium, Qingdao, China	(China) Cheng Shu	(China) Tian Qing (China) Zhao Yunlei	Walkover	Bronze
2010	Siri Fort Indoor Stadium, New Delhi, India	(China) Tian Qing	(Malaysia) Vivian Hoo Kah Mun (Malaysia) Woon Khe Wei	21–10, 21–6	Gold
2006	Bandaraya Stadium, Johor Bahru, Malaysia	(China) Tian Qing	(China) Du Jing (China) Yu Yang	Walkover	Bronze

Mixed doubles
Year	Venue	Partner	Opponent	Score	Result
2011	Sichuan Gymnasium, Chengdu, China	(China) Hong Wei	(China) Zhang Nan (China) Zhao Yunlei	15–21, 11–21	Bronze

=== Summer Universiade ===
Women's doubles
Year	Venue	Partner	Opponent	Score	Result
2007	Thammasat University, Pathum Thani, Thailand	(China) Tian Qing	(Chinese Taipei) Chien Yu-chin (Chinese Taipei) Cheng Wen-hsing	9–21, 13–21	Silver

=== World Junior Championships ===
Girls' doubles
Year	Venue	Partner	Opponent	Score	Result
2004	Minoru Arena, Richmond, Canada	(China) Feng Chen	(China) Tian Qing (China) Yu Yang	3–15, 5–15	Silver

=== Asian Junior Championships ===
Girls' doubles
Year	Venue	Partner	Opponent	Score	Result
2004	Hwacheon Indoor Stadium, Hwacheon, South Korea	(China) Feng Chen	(China) Ding Jiao (China) Zhao Yunlei	15–5, 8–15, 12–15	Silver

Mixed doubles
Year	Venue	Partner	Opponent	Score	Result
2004	Hwacheon Indoor Stadium, Hwacheon, South Korea	(China) He Hanbin	(South Korea) Yoo Yeon-seong (South Korea) Ha Jung-eun	13–15, 15–6, 13–15	Bronze

=== BWF Superseries ===
The BWF Superseries, launched on 14 December 2006 and implemented in 2007, is a series of elite badminton tournaments, sanctioned by Badminton World Federation (BWF). BWF Superseries has two level such as Superseries and Superseries Premier. A season of Superseries features twelve tournaments around the world, which introduced since 2011, with successful players invited to the Superseries Finals held at the year end.

Women's doubles
Year	Tournament	Partner	Opponent	Score	Result
2009	Denmark Open	(China) Zhang Yawen	(Denmark) Kamilla Rytter Juhl (Denmark) Lena Frier Kristiansen	22–20, 18–21, 21–12	(gold) Winner

BWF Super Series Finals tournament
BWF Super Series Premier tournament
BWF Super Series tournament

=== BWF Grand Prix ===
The BWF Grand Prix has two levels: Grand Prix and Grand Prix Gold. It is a series of badminton tournaments, sanctioned by Badminton World Federation (BWF) since 2007.

Women's doubles
Year	Tournament	Partner	Opponent	Score	Result
2012	Thailand Open	(China) Cheng Shu	(Thailand) Narissapat Lam (Thailand) Saralee Thoungthongkam	15–21, 21–10, 13–21	(silver) Runner-up
2010	Bitburger Open	(China) Tian Qing	(Netherlands) Lotte Bruil-Jonathans (Netherlands) Pauline van Dooremalen	21–7, 21–10	(gold) Winner
2009	German Open	(China) Tian Qing	(China) Cheng Shu (China) Zhao Yunlei	21–18, 13–21, 16–21	(silver) Runner-up
2007	Philippines Open	(China) Tian Qing	(Chinese Taipei) Chien Yu-chin (Chinese Taipei) Cheng Wen-hsing	20–22, 14–21	(silver) Runner-up

BWF Grand Prix Gold tournament
BWF Grand Prix tournament

=== BWF International Challenge/Series ===
Women's doubles
Year	Tournament	Partner	Opponent	Score	Result
2007	Austrian International	(China) Tian Qing	(China) Cheng Shu (China) Zhao Yunlei	18–21, 13–21	(silver) Runner-up
2004	Polish International	(China) Feng Chen	(China) Du Jing (China) Yu Yang	5–15, 6–15	(silver) Runner-up
2004	French International	(China) Feng Chen	(China) Du Jing (China) Yu Yang	15–5, 4–15, 6–15	(silver) Runner-up
2003	Malaysia Satellite	(China) Wang Xin	(Japan) Aki Akao (Japan) Tomomi Matsuda	15–8, 9–15, 11–15	(silver) Runner-up

Mixed doubles
Year	Tournament	Partner	Opponent	Score	Result
2004	Polish International	(China) Sun Junjie	(Ukraine) Vladislav Druzchenko (Ukraine) Elena Nozdran	11–15, 7–15	(silver) Runner-up

BWF International Challenge tournament
BWF International Series tournament
