= Ha Jung-eun =

South Korean badminton player (born 1987)

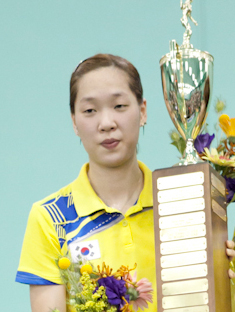

Personal information
- Born: April 26, 1987 (age 39) Busan, South Korea
- Years active: 2003 – 2012
- Height: 1.73 m (5 ft 8 in)
- Weight: 66 kg (130 lb)

Sport
- Country: South Korea
- Sport: Badminton
- Handedness: Right

Women's & mixed doubles
- Highest ranking: 2 (WD with Kim Min-jung); 4 (XD)
- BWF profile
Medal record
Women's badminton
Representing South Korea
World Championships
Bronze medal – third place	2010 Paris	Mixed doubles
World Cup
Bronze medal – third place	2005 Yiyang	Women's doubles
Sudirman Cup
Silver medal – second place	2009 Guangzhou	Mixed team
Bronze medal – third place	2011 Qingdao	Mixed team
Bronze medal – third place	2005 Beijing	Mixed team
Uber Cup
Gold medal – first place	2010 Kuala Lumpur	Women's team
Silver medal – second place	2012 Wuhan	Women's team
Silver medal – second place	2004 Jakarta	Women's team
Bronze medal – third place	2008 Jakarta	Women's team
Asian Games
Bronze medal – third place	2010 Guangzhou	Women's doubles
Bronze medal – third place	2010 Guangzhou	Women's team
Bronze medal – third place	2006 Doha	Women's team
Asian Championships
Bronze medal – third place	2011 Chengdu	Women's doubles
World Junior Championships
Silver medal – second place	2004 Richmond	Mixed team
Bronze medal – third place	2004 Richmond	Girls' singles
Bronze medal – third place	2004 Richmond	Girls' doubles
Asian Junior Championships
Gold medal – first place	2005 Jakarta	Mixed doubles
Silver medal – second place	2005 Jakarta	Girls' doubles
Silver medal – second place	2004 Hwacheon	Mixed doubles
Silver medal – second place	2004 Hwacheon	Girls' team
Bronze medal – third place	2005 Jakarta	Girls' team
Bronze medal – third place	2004 Hwacheon	Girls' doubles

Ha Jung-eun (Korean: 하정은; born April 26, 1987) is a women's and mixed doubles badminton player from South Korea. Ha was competed at the 2006, 2010 Asian Games, 2008 and 2012 Summer Olympics. Together with the Korean national women's team, they won the Uber Cup in 2010. At the same year, she won the bronze medal at the World Championships in the mixed doubles event.

== Career ==
Ha was competed at the 2004 World Junior Championships in Richmond, Canada, reached the semi-finals round in the girs' singles and doubles event. At the 2004 and 2005 Asian Junior Championships, she achieved the best result by winning the 2005 mixed doubles title partnered with Lee Yong-dae. Ha junior was selected to join at the Korean national women's team, compete at the 2004 Uber Cup in Jakarta Indonesia. The team finished as the runner-up losing to China with the score 3–1.

In 2010, Ha with her women's doubles partner, Lee Kyung-won, became the semi-finalists in Korea Open Super Series, and with Ko Sung-hyun in the mixed event, they only reached the quarter-finals. In All England, Ha and Ko suffered a first-round defeat to Zheng Bo and Ma Jin of China 17–21 and 12–21. Meanwhile, Ha and Lee, seeded seventh, vanquished Indonesia's Shendy Puspa Irawati and Nitya Krishinda Maheswari in straight sets, 21–18 and 21–18, before bowing out to Chinese third seeds, Cheng Shu and Zhao Yunlei in the semi-finals.

The next week's tournament in Switzerland brought unsatisfying result for Ha and Ko as they lost to the eventual finalists and their countrymen, Shin Baek-cheol and Yoo Hyun-young, in a tough three-setter, 21–19, 9–21, 19–21. However, in the women's event, Ha and Lee succeeded to their third semi-final of 2010, edging fourth-seeded Petya Nedeltcheva and Anastasia Russkikh out with a 21–17 and 21–11 win. Ha and Lee fought hard in the semi-final but finally lost 21–13, 19–21, and 20–22 to Miyuki Maeda and Satoko Suetsuna of Japan. Ha played for the Korean Uber Cup team on May 9–16. She and Lee Kyung-won defeated Yu Yang and Du Jing of China in the final 19–21, 21–14, and 21–19, giving the first Uber Cup for Korea.

In 2011, Ha paired up with Lee Yong-dae again and they won the U.S. Open Grand Prix Gold title in July. In the women's doubles event, she also won the Grand Prix Gold title in Swiss, U.S., and Chinese Taipei partnered with Kim Min-jung. She and Kim was qualified at the Superseries Finals, and finished in the second place after losing a match to Wang Xiaoli and Yu Yang.

At the 2012 Summer Olympics, Ha and her partner Kim Min-jung, along with Jung Kyung-eun and Kim Ha-na of South Korea, Wang Xiaoli and Yu Yang of China, and Meiliana Jauhari and Greysia Polii of Indonesia were disqualified from the competition for "not using one's best efforts to win a match" and "conducting oneself in a manner that is clearly abusive or detrimental to the sport" following matches the previous evening during which they were accused of trying to lose in order to manipulate the draw. Ha and her partner Kim Min-jung played against Indonesia's Meiliana Jauhari and Greysia Polii. It is suspected that the Koreans emulated China so to avoid playing against another Korean team in the semi-finals; the Korean head coach Sung Han-kook said "Because they don't want to play the semi-final against each other, so we did the same. We didn't want to play the South Korean team again". South Korea filed an appeal to the case, but it was rejected by the Badminton World Federation.

== Achievements ==
=== BWF World Championships ===
Mixed doubles
Year	Venue	Partner	Opponent	Score	Result
2010	Stade Pierre de Coubertin; Paris, France	(South Korea) Ko Sung-hyun	(China) Zheng Bo (China) Ma Jin	21–15, 11–21, 16–21	Bronze

=== World Cup ===
Women's doubles
Year	Venue	Partner	Opponent	Score	Result
2005	Olympic Park, Yiyang, China	(South Korea) Kim Min-jung	(China) Wei Yili (China) Zhang Yawen	11–21, 13–21	Bronze

=== Asian Games ===
Women's doubles
Year	Venue	Partner	Opponent	Score	Result
2010	Tianhe Gymnasium; Guangzhou, China	(South Korea) Lee Kyung-won	(China) Wang Xiaoli (China) Yu Yang	17–21, 14–21	Bronze

=== Asian Championships ===
Women's doubles
Year	Venue	Partner	Opponent	Score	Result
2011	Sichuan Gymnasium; Chengdu, China	(South Korea) Kim Min-jung	(China) Tian Qing (China) Zhao Yunlei	15–21, 21–19, 17–21	Bronze

=== World Junior Championships ===
Girls' singles
Year	Venue	Opponent	Score	Result
2004	Minoru Arena; Richmond, Canada	(Chinese Taipei) Cheng Shao-chieh	4–11, 2–11	Bronze

Girls' doubles
Year	Venue	Partner	Opponent	Score	Result
2004	Minoru Arena; Richmond, Canada	(South Korea) Oh Seul-ki	(China) Feng Chen (China) Pan Pan	10–15, 9–15	Bronze

=== Asian Junior Championships ===
Girls' doubles
Year	Venue	Partner	Opponent	Score	Result
2005	Tennis Indoor Senayan; Jakarta, Indonesia	(South Korea) Hong Soo-jung	(China) Cheng Shu (China) Liao Jingmei	15–11, 12–15, 5–15	Silver
2004	Hwacheon Indoor Stadium; Hwacheon, South Korea	(South Korea) Oh Seul-ki	(China) Ding Jiao (China) Zhao Yunlei	6–15, 12–15	Bronze

Mixed doubles
Year	Venue	Partner	Opponent	Score	Result
2005	Tennis Indoor Senayan; Jakarta, Indonesia	(South Korea) Lee Yong-dae	(China) Zhang Wei (China) Liao Jingmei	11–15, 15–8, 15–2	Gold
2004	Hwacheon Indoor Stadium; Hwacheon, South Korea	(South Korea) Yoo Yeon-seong	(China) Shen Ye (China) Feng Chen	11–15, 6–15	Silver

=== BWF Superseries ===
The BWF Superseries, launched on December 14, 2006 and implemented in 2007, is a series of elite badminton tournaments, sanctioned by Badminton World Federation (BWF). BWF Superseries has two level such as Superseries and Superseries Premier. A season of Superseries features twelve tournaments around the world, which introduced since 2011, with successful players invited to the Superseries Finals held at the year end.

Women's doubles
Year	Tournament	Partner	Opponent	Score	Result
2012	Malaysia Open	(South Korea) Kim Min-jung	(Denmark) Christinna Pedersen (Denmark) Kamilla Rytter Juhl	19–21, 18–21	(silver) Runner-up
2012	Korea Open	(South Korea) Kim Min-jung	(China) Tian Qing (China) Zhao Yunlei	18–21, 13–21	(silver) Runner-up
2011	Superseries Finals	(South Korea) Kim Min-jung	(China) Wang Xiaoli (China) Yu Yang	8–21, 12–21	(silver) Runner-up
2011	Singapore Open	(South Korea) Kim Min-jung	(China) Tian Qing (China) Zhao Yunlei	13–21, 16–21	(silver) Runner-up

Mixed doubles
Year	Tournament	Partner	Opponent	Score	Result
2012	Korea Open	(South Korea) Lee Yong-dae	(China) Xu Chen (China) Ma Jin	12–21, 21–19, 10–21	(silver) Runner-up
2009	All England Open	(South Korea) Ko Sung-hyun	(China) He Hanbin (China) Yu Yang	21–13, 15–21, 9–21	(silver) Runner-up

BWF Super Series Finals tournament
BWF Super Series Premier tournament
BWF Super Series tournament

=== BWF Grand Prix ===
The BWF Grand Prix has two levels, the Grand Prix Gold and Grand Prix. It is a series of badminton tournaments, sanctioned by the Badminton World Federation (BWF) since 2007. The World Badminton Grand Prix has been sanctioned by the International Badminton Federation since 1983.

Women's doubles
Year	Tournament	Partner	Opponent	Score	Result
2011	Chinese Taipei Open	(South Korea) Kim Min-jung	(Indonesia) Meiliana Jauhari (Indonesia) Greysia Polii	17–21, 21–18, 2–0 Retired	(gold) Winner
2011	U.S. Open	(South Korea) Kim Min-jung	(South Korea) Jung Kyung-eun (South Korea) Kim Ha-na	14–21, 22–20, 21–18	(gold) Winner
2011	Swiss Open	(South Korea) Kim Min-jung	(South Korea) Jung Kyung-eun (South Korea) Kim Ha-na	21–12, 21–13	(gold) Winner
2011	German Open	(South Korea) Kim Min-jung	(Japan) Mizuki Fujii (Japan) Reika Kakiiwa	6–21, 14–21	(silver) Runner-up
2003	U.S. Open	(South Korea) Lee Eun-woo	(Japan) Yoshiko Iwata (Japan) Miyuki Tai	5–15, 4–15	(silver) Runner-up

Mixed doubles
Year	Tournament	Partner	Opponent	Score	Result
2012	German Open	(South Korea) Lee Yong-dae	(Denmark) Thomas Laybourn (Denmark) Kamilla Rytter Juhl	9–21, 16–21	(silver) Runner-up
2011	U.S. Open	(South Korea) Lee Yong-dae	(Chinese Taipei) Chen Hung-ling (Chinese Taipei) Cheng Wen-hsing	21–19, 21–13	(gold) Winner

BWF Grand Prix Gold tournament
BWF Grand Prix tournament

=== BWF International Challenge/Series/Satellite ===
Women's singles
Year	Tournament	Opponent	Score	Result
2003	Canadian International	(South Korea) Lee Eun-woo	2–11, 11–7, 1–11	(silver) Runner-up
2003	Hungarian International	(Scotland) Susan Hughes	4–11, 4–11	(silver) Runner-up

Women's doubles
Year	Tournament	Partner	Opponent	Score	Result
2009	Korea International	(South Korea) Lee Kyung-won	(South Korea) Yoo Hyun-young (South Korea) Jung Kyung-eun	19–21, 10–21	(silver) Runner-up
2008	Korea International	(South Korea) Kim Min-jung	(South Korea) Jang Ye-na (South Korea) Kim Mi-young	21–15, 21–14	(gold) Winner
2008	Osaka International	(South Korea) Kim Min-jung	(Japan) Kumiko Ogura (Japan) Reiko Shiota	22–20, 8–21, 13–21	(silver) Runner-up
2007	Canadian International	(South Korea) Hwang Yu-mi	(South Korea) Joo Hyun-hee (South Korea) Oh Seul-ki	21–16, 21–7	(gold) Winner
2007	Cheers Asian Satellite	(South Korea) Kim Min-jung	(Indonesia) Richi Puspita Dili (Indonesia) Yulianti CJ	21–18, 21–12	(gold) Winner
2007	Vietnam International	(South Korea) Kim Min-jung	(Indonesia) Richi Puspita Dili (Indonesia) Yulianti CJ	17–21, 21–9, 16–21	(silver) Runner-up
2005	Cheers Asian Satellite	(South Korea) Kim Min-jung	(Singapore) Jiang Yanmei (Singapore) Li Yujia	3–15, 1–15	(silver) Runner-up
2005	Surabaya Satellite	(South Korea) Kim Min-jung	(Indonesia) Nitya Krishinda Maheswari (Indonesia) Nadya Melati	15–13, 15–0	(gold) Winner
2005	Mongolian Satellite	(South Korea) Oh Seul-ki	(China) Tao Xiaolan (China) Wu Bei		(silver) Runner-up
2005	Vietnam Satellite	(South Korea) Oh Seul-ki	(South Korea) Kang Hae-won (South Korea) Kim Min-jung	15–6, 7–15, 15–5	(silver) Runner-up
2005	Canadian International	(South Korea) Oh Seul-ki	(South Korea) Jun Woul-sik (South Korea) Ra Kyung-min	5–15, 9–15	(silver) Runner-up
2003	Canadian International	(South Korea) Lee Eun-woo	(South Korea) Jang Soo-young (South Korea) Kim Mi-young	1–15, 17–16, 15–9	(gold) Winner
2003	Norwegian International	(South Korea) Oh Seul-ki	(South Korea) Jang Soo-young (South Korea) Kim Mi-young	15–6, 15–2	(gold) Winner

Mixed doubles
Year	Tournament	Partner	Opponent	Score	Result
2009	Korea International	(South Korea) Ko Sung-hyun	(South Korea) Lee Yong-dae (South Korea) Lee Hyo-jung	14–21, 21–15, 9–21	(silver) Runner-up
2008	Osaka International	(South Korea) Kwon Yi-goo	(Japan) Noriyasu Hirata (Japan) Shizuka Matsuo	24–22, 21–13	(gold) Winner
2007	Cheers Asian Satellite	(South Korea) Yoo Yeon-seong	(South Korea) Cho Gun-woo (South Korea) Kim Min-jung	19–21, 15–21	(silver) Runner-up
2005	Cheers Asian Satellite	(South Korea) Lee Yong-dae	(Singapore) Hendri Kurniawan Saputra (Singapore) Li Yujia	6–15, 8–15	(silver) Runner-up
2005	Mongolian Satellite	(South Korea) Lee Yong-dae	(China) Wang Wei (China) Tao Xiaolan	15–7, 15–11	(gold) Winner
2005	Vietnam Satellite	(South Korea) Jeon Jun-bum	(South Korea) Hwang Ji-man (South Korea) Oh Seul-ki	15–7, 6–15, 12–15	(silver) Runner-up
2005	Canadian International	(South Korea) Kang Kyung-jin	(South Korea) Han Sung-wook (South Korea) Joo Hyun-hee	15–12, 15–13	(gold) Winner

BWF International Challenge tournament
BWF International Series tournament
