= Kim Sa-rang (badminton) =

South Korean badminton player (born 1989)

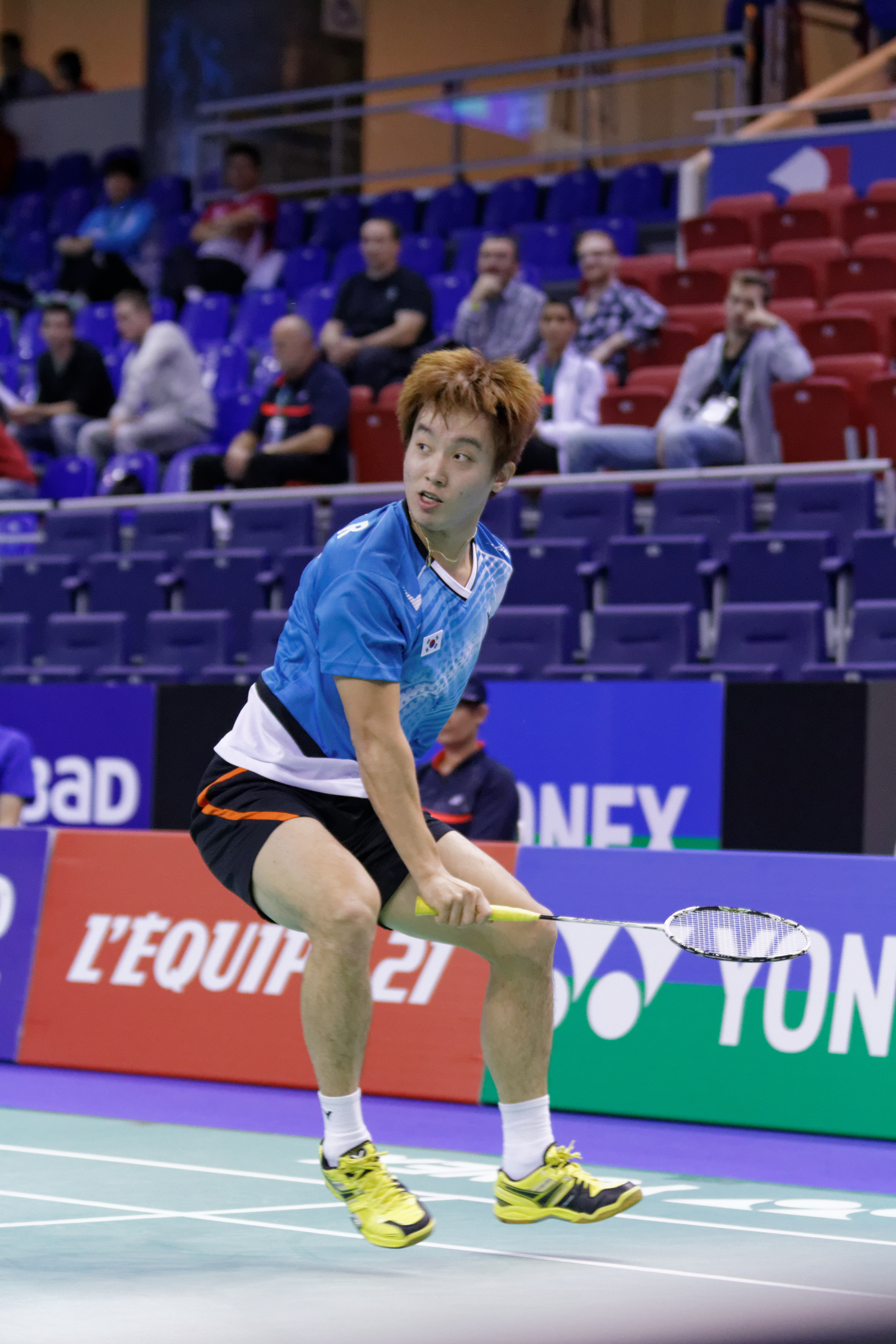
- Kim Sa-rang at the 2013 French Super Series.

Personal information
- Born: 22 August 1989 (age 37) Incheon, South Korea
- Height: 1.78 m (5 ft 10 in)
- Weight: 63 kg (139 lb)

Sport
- Country: South Korea
- Sport: Badminton
- Handedness: Right

Men's singles & doubles
- Highest ranking: 76 (MS 8 April 2010); 2 (MD with Kim Gi-jung 22 September 2016); 41 (XD with Choi Hye-in 28 February 2013)
- Current ranking: 62 (MD with Kim Gi-jung 4 March 2025)
- BWF profile
Medal record
Men's badminton
Representing South Korea
World Championships
| Bronze medal – third place | 2013 Guangzhou | Men's doubles |
| Bronze medal – third place | 2014 Copenhagen | Men's doubles |
Sudirman Cup
| Silver medal – second place | 2013 Kuala Lumpur | Mixed team |
| Bronze medal – third place | 2015 Dongguan | Mixed team |
Thomas Cup
| Silver medal – second place | 2012 Wuhan | Men's team |
| Bronze medal – third place | 2016 Kunshan | Men's team |
Asian Games
| Gold medal – first place | 2014 Incheon | Men's team |
| Bronze medal – third place | 2014 Incheon | Men's doubles |
Asian Championships
| Gold medal – first place | 2012 Qingdao | Men's doubles |
| Silver medal – second place | 2013 Taipei | Men's doubles |
| Bronze medal – third place | 2012 Qingdao | Mixed doubles |
| Bronze medal – third place | 2015 Wuhan | Men's doubles |
Asia Team Championships
| Bronze medal – third place | 2016 Hyderabad | Men's team |
Summer Universiade
| Gold medal – first place | 2015 Gwangju | Men's doubles |
| Gold medal – first place | 2015 Gwangju | Mixed team |
| Bronze medal – third place | 2015 Gwangju | Mixed doubles |
World Junior Championships
| Silver medal – second place | 2007 Waitakere City | Mixed team |

Kim Sa-rang (Korean: 김사랑; Korean pronunciation: [kim.sa.ɾaŋ]; born 22 August 1989) is a South Korean badminton player. He competed at the Rio 2016 Summer Olympics.

== Career ==
Kim Sa-rang started playing badminton when he was in elementary school, and his international debut on the Osaka International tournament. He joined the Korea national badminton team in 2008. At that year, he won the Australia International Challenge tournament in the men's doubles event partnered with Choi Sang-won. In 2011, he won the Turkey International tournament in the men's doubles event with Kim Gi-jung.

In 2012, he and Kim Gi-jung won their first Superseries title at the Japan Open tournament. In the final round they beat the Malaysian pair Koo Kien Keat and Tan Boon Heong. At the 2012 Badminton Asia Championships in Qingdao, China, they won a gold medal after defeat Hiroyuki Endo and Kenichi Hayakawa of Japan in the final round. In September 2012, they also won the men's doubles title at the Indonesian Masters tournament.

In 2013, he became the champion at the Chinese Taipei and South Korea Grand Prix Gold tournament. At the Chinese Taipei, he and Kim Gi-jung beat the host partner Lee Sheng-mu and Tsai Chia-hsin in the straight set. At the Korea, they won the title after beat their compatriots Ko Sung-hyun and Shin Baek-cheol with the score 2–1. He also won a silver medal at the 2013 Badminton Asia Championships in Taipei. At the 2013 BWF World Championships in Guangzhou, he and his partner were seeded fifth in that tournament. They beat the second seeded of Malaysia in the quarterfinal round, and in the semifinal round they were defeated by Boe and Mogensen in three sets, and settle for the bronze medal. At the end of the 2013 BWF Season, he qualified to compete at the Super Series Masters Finals in Kuala Lumpur, Malaysia. Finally, he became the runner-up in the men's doubles event after defeated by Mohammad Ahsan and Hendra Setiawan of Indonesia. In 2014, he won a bronze medal at the Asian Games in the men's doubles event.

In 2015, he and Kim Gi-jung won the Korea Masters Grand Prix Gold tournament in the men's doubles event. In the final round they beat Ko Sung-hyun and Shin Baek-cheol with the score 16–21, 21–18, 21–19. They also won the China Open Super Series Premier tournament, after beat Chai Biao and Hong Wei in the straight games. In 2016, they also won the Superseries Premier tournament in Malaysia. He and his partner beat the third seeded from China in the quarterfinal round, and the world No.1 pair, Lee Yong-dae and Yoo Yeon-seong in the semifinal. In the final round they beat Chai Biao and Hong Wei with the score 21–19, 21–15. He and Kim Sa-rang also competed at the Summer Olympics in the men's doubles event. They lost in the quarterfinal round, defeated by Fu Haifeng and Zhang Nan of China with the score 21–11, 18-21 and 22–24. After the Rio Olympics, he decided to retire from the national team, and on 31 October 2016, BWF sites officially announced his retirement. However, in 2018 he has since played as an independent player separate from the BKA with the Malaysian former world number one, Tan Boon Heong, in the Macau Open and Korea Masters.

== Achievements ==
=== BWF World Championships ===
Men's doubles
| Year | Venue | Partner | Opponent | Score | Result |
|---|---|---|---|---|---|
| 2013 | Tianhe Sports Center; Guangzhou, China | (South Korea) Kim Gi-jung | (Denmark) Mathias Boe (Denmark) Carsten Mogensen | 23–21, 18–21, 18–21 | Bronze |
| 2014 | Ballerup Super Arena; Copenhagen, Denmark | (South Korea) Kim Gi-jung | (South Korea) Ko Sung-hyun (South Korea) Shin Baek-cheol | Walkover | Bronze |

=== Asian Games ===
Men's doubles
| Year | Venue | Partner | Opponent | Score | Result |
|---|---|---|---|---|---|
| 2014 | Gyeyang Gymnasium; Incheon, South Korea | (South Korea) Kim Gi-jung | (Indonesia) Mohammad Ahsan (Indonesia) Hendra Setiawan | 21–19, 16–21, 18–21 | Bronze |

=== Asian Championships ===
Men's doubles
| Year | Venue | Partner | Opponent | Score | Result |
|---|---|---|---|---|---|
| 2012 | Qingdao Sports Centre Conson Stadium; Qingdao, China | (South Korea) Kim Gi-jung | (Japan) Hiroyuki Endo (Japan) Kenichi Hayakawa | 21–12, 21–16 | Gold |
| 2013 | Taipei Arena; Taipei, Taiwan | (South Korea) Kim Gi-jung | (South Korea) Ko Sung-hyun (South Korea) Lee Yong-dae | 13–21, 20–22 | Silver |
| 2015 | Wuhan Sports Center Gymnasium; Wuhan, China | (South Korea) Kim Gi-jung | (South Korea) Lee Yong-dae (South Korea) Yoo Yeon-seong | 18–21, 9–21 | Bronze |

Mixed doubles
| Year | Venue | Partner | Opponent | Score | Result |
|---|---|---|---|---|---|
| 2012 | Qingdao Sports Centre Conson Stadium; Qingdao, China | (South Korea) Choi Hye-in | (China) Zhang Nan (China) Zhao Yunlei | 13–21, 21–12, 13–21 | Bronze |

=== Summer Universiade ===
Men's doubles
| Year | Venue | Partner | Opponent | Score | Result |
|---|---|---|---|---|---|
| 2015 | Hwasun Hanium Culture Sports Center; Hwasun, South Korea | (South Korea) Kim Gi-jung | (China) Wang Yilyu (China) Zhang Wen | 21–16, 22–20 | Gold |

Mixed doubles
| Year | Venue | Partner | Opponent | Score | Result |
|---|---|---|---|---|---|
| 2015 | Hwasun Hanium Culture Sports Center; Hwasun, South Korea | (South Korea) Go Ah-ra | (South Korea) Kim Gi-jung (South Korea) Shin Seung-chan | 10–21, 17–21 | Bronze |

=== BWF World Tour (2 titles) ===
The BWF World Tour, which was announced on 19 March 2017 and implemented in 2018, is a series of elite badminton tournaments sanctioned by the Badminton World Federation (BWF). The BWF World Tour is divided into levels of World Tour Finals, Super 1000, Super 750, Super 500, Super 300, and the BWF Tour Super 100.

Men's doubles
| Year | Tournament | Level | Partner | Opponent | Score | Result |
|---|---|---|---|---|---|---|
| 2022 | Korea Masters | Super 300 | (South Korea) Kim Gi-jung | (China) Liu Yuchen (China) Ou Xuanyi | 21–14, 21–16 | (gold) Winner |

Mixed doubles
| Year | Tournament | Level | Partner | Opponent | Score | Result |
|---|---|---|---|---|---|---|
| 2020 | Spain Masters | Super 300 | (South Korea) Kim Ha-na | (France) Thom Gicquel (France) Delphine Delrue | 15–21, 21–11, 21–10 | (gold) Winner |

=== BWF Superseries (3 titles, 3 runners-up) ===
The BWF Superseries, which was launched on 14 December 2006 and implemented in 2007, was a series of elite badminton tournaments, sanctioned by the Badminton World Federation (BWF). BWF Superseries levels were Superseries and Superseries Premier. A season of Superseries consisted of twelve tournaments around the world that had been introduced since 2011. Successful players were invited to the Superseries Finals, which were held at the end of each year.

Men's doubles
| Year | Tournament | Partner | Opponent | Score | Result |
|---|---|---|---|---|---|
| 2012 | Japan Open | (South Korea) Kim Gi-jung | (Malaysia) Koo Kien Keat (Malaysia) Tan Boon Heong | 21–16, 21–19 | (gold) Winner |
| 2013 | Hong Kong Open | (South Korea) Kim Gi-jung | (South Korea) Lee Yong-dae (South Korea) Yoo Yeon-seong | 21–12, 15–21, 18–21 | (silver) Runner-up |
| 2013 | World Superseries Finals | (South Korea) Kim Gi-jung | (Indonesia) Mohammad Ahsan (Indonesia) Hendra Setiawan | 14–21, 16–21 | (silver) Runner-up |
| 2015 | Korea Open | (South Korea) Kim Gi-jung | (South Korea) Lee Yong-dae (South Korea) Yoo Yeon-seong | 16–21, 12–21 | (silver) Runner-up |
| 2015 | China Open | (South Korea) Kim Gi-jung | (China) Chai Biao (China) Hong Wei | 21–13, 21–19 | (gold) Winner |
| 2016 | Malaysia Open | (South Korea) Kim Gi-jung | (China) Chai Biao (China) Hong Wei | 21–19, 21–15 | (gold) Winner |

BWF Super Series Finals tournament
BWF Super Series Premier tournament
BWF Super Series tournament

=== BWF Grand Prix (4 titles, 4 runners-up) ===
The BWF Grand Prix had two levels, the Grand Prix and Grand Prix Gold. It was a series of badminton tournaments sanctioned by the Badminton World Federation (BWF) and played between 2007 and 2017.

Men's doubles
| Year | Tournament | Partner | Opponent | Score | Result |
|---|---|---|---|---|---|
| 2011 | German Open | (South Korea) Kim Gi-jung | (South Korea) Jung Jae-sung (South Korea) Lee Yong-dae | 19–21, 21–18, 11–21 | (silver) Runner-up |
| 2012 | Indonesia Grand Prix Gold | (South Korea) Kim Gi-jung | (Indonesia) Angga Pratama (Indonesia) Rian Agung Saputro | 21–13, 21–9 | (gold) Winner |
| 2012 | Korea Grand Prix Gold | (South Korea) Kim Gi-jung | (South Korea) Ko Sung-hyun (South Korea) Lee Yong-dae | 12–21, 11–21 | (silver) Runner-up |
| 2013 | Chinese Taipei Open | (South Korea) Kim Gi-jung | (Chinese Taipei) Lee Sheng-mu (Chinese Taipei) Tsai Chia-hsin | 21–11, 21–11 | (gold) Winner |
| 2013 | Korea Grand Prix Gold | (South Korea) Kim Gi-jung | (South Korea) Ko Sung-hyun (South Korea) Shin Baek-cheol | 21–15, 18–21, 25–23 | (gold) Winner |
| 2015 | Korea Masters | (South Korea) Kim Gi-jung | (South Korea) Ko Sung-hyun (South Korea) Shin Baek-cheol | 16–21, 21–18, 21–19 | (gold) Winner |
| 2016 | Thailand Masters | (South Korea) Kim Gi-jung | (Indonesia) Mohammad Ahsan (Indonesia) Hendra Setiawan | 21–12, 15–21, 12–21 | (silver) Runner-up |
| 2016 | China Masters | (South Korea) Kim Gi-jung | (South Korea) Lee Yong-dae (South Korea) Yoo Yeon-seong | 17–21, 14–21 | (silver) Runner-up |

BWF Grand Prix Gold tournament
BWF Grand Prix tournament

=== BWF International Challenge/Series (6 titles, 4 runners-up) ===
Men's doubles
| Year | Tournament | Partner | Opponent | Score | Result |
|---|---|---|---|---|---|
| 2008 | Australia International | (South Korea) Choi Sang-won | (Chinese Taipei) Chien Yu-hsun (Chinese Taipei) Lin Yu-lang | 21–17, 16–21, 21–11 | (gold) Winner |
| 2011 | Turkey International | (South Korea) Kim Gi-jung | (South Korea) Cho Gun-woo (South Korea) Shin Baek-choel | 21–17, 16–21, 21–15 | (gold) Winner |
| 2019 | South Australia International | (South Korea) Kim Duk-young | (Malaysia) Shia Chun Kang (Malaysia) Tan Boon Heong | 21–14, 17–21, 21–16 | (gold) Winner |
| 2019 | Hungarian International | (South Korea) Kim Duk-young | (Canada) Peter Briggs (Canada) Joshua Hurlburt-Yu | 21–12, 21–17 | (gold) Winner |
| 2021 | Welsh International | (South Korea) Kim Gi-jung | (Malaysia) Man Wei Chong (Malaysia) Tee Kai Wun | 21–18, 18–21, 21–15 | (gold) Winner |

Mixed doubles
| Year | Tournament | Partner | Opponent | Score | Result |
|---|---|---|---|---|---|
| 2011 | Turkey International | (South Korea) Lee So-hee | (South Korea) Cho Gun-woo (South Korea) Yoo Hyun-young | 25–23, 9–21, 19–21 | (silver) Runner-up |
| 2019 | Dubai International | (South Korea) Kim Ha-na | (Russia) Rodion Alimov (Russia) Alina Davletova | 20–22, 16–21 | (silver) Runner-up |
| 2019 | Hungarian International | (South Korea) Kim Ha-na | (Denmark) Mathias Christiansen (Denmark) Alexandra Bøje | 21–12, 21–15 | (gold) Winner |
| 2019 | Nepal International | (South Korea) Kim Ha-na | (Thailand) Supak Jomkoh (Thailand) Supissara Paewsampran | 18–21, 16–21 | (silver) Runner-up |
| 2019 | Italian International | (South Korea) Eom Hye-won | (Russia) Vladimir Ivanov (Russia) Ekaterina Bolotova | 12–21, 21–18, 15–21 | (silver) Runner-up |

BWF International Challenge tournament
BWF International Series tournament
