= 2015 China Open Super Series Premier =

Tournament details
- Dates: 10 November 2015 – 15 November 2015
- Level: Super Series Premier
- Total prize money: US$700,000
- Venue: Haixia Olympic Sports Center
- Location: Fuzhou, China

Champions
- Men's singles: (Malaysia) Lee Chong Wei
- Women's singles: (China) Li Xuerui
- Men's doubles: (South Korea) Kim Gi-jung (South Korea) Kim Sa-rang
- Women's doubles: (China) Tang Yuanting (China) Yu Yang
- Mixed doubles: (China) Zhang Nan (China) Zhao Yunlei

The 2015 China Open Super Series Premier was the eleventh Super Series tournament of the 2015 BWF Super Series. The tournament was contested in Fuzhou, China from November 10 to November 15, 2015 with a total purse of $700,000. A qualification occurred to fill four places in three disciplines of the main draws.

Players from twenty-one nations competed. The winners were: Lee Chong Wei of Malaysia (Men's Singles); Li Xuerui of China (Women's Singles); Kim Gi-jung & Kim Sa-rang of South Korea (Men's Doubles); Tang Yuanting & Yu Yang of China (Women's Doubles); and Zhang Nan & Zhao Yunlei of China (Mixed Doubles).

== Players by nation ==
Nation	First round	Second round	Quarterfinals	Semifinals	Final
(China)	11	8	6	6	2
(Chinese Taipei)	9	3			
(Japan)	8	4	2	1	1
(Indonesia)	6	1	1		
(United States)	6				
(India)	5	1			1
(Germany)	4	1			
(Thailand)	4	1			
(South Korea)	3	7	1	3	
(Hong Kong)	3	3	1		
(Malaysia)	3	3	1		
(Egypt)	3				
(Netherlands)	2	1			
(Russia)	2				
(Denmark)	1	1	4		1
(Republic of Ireland)	1				
(New Zealand)	1				
(England)	1		1		
(France)		1			
(Canada)		1			
(Spain)			1		

== Men's singles ==
=== Seeds ===
1. (China) Chen Long (final)
2. (Denmark) Jan Ø. Jørgensen (quarterfinals)
3. (China) Lin Dan (semifinals)
4. (Japan) Kento Momota (second round)
5. (India) Srikanth Kidambi (first round)
6. (Chinese Taipei) Chou Tien-chen (second round)
7. (Denmark) Viktor Axelsen (quarterfinals)
8. (India) Parupalli Kashyap (withdrawn)
Qualification

=== Qualifying draw ===
==== Qualifier 1 ====
First Round
1	(Republic of Ireland) Scott Evans	P	M	D
(China) Wu Xin
(China) Zhou Zeqi	21	21
(Scotland) Alistair Casey	8	18

Second Round
(China) Wu Xin	17	14
(China) Zhou Zeqi	21	21

==== Qualifier 2 ====
First Round
3	(Chinese Taipei) Wang Tzu-wei	15	18
(China) Qiao Bin	21	21
(China) Ren Pengbo	21	21
(Egypt) Abdelrahman Kashkal	3	9

Second Round
(China) Qiao Bin	21	21
(China) Ren Pengbo	16	9

==== Qualifier 3 ====
First Round
(Indonesia) Wibowo Kho Henrikho	12	17
(China) Liu Haichao	21	21
(China) Shi Yuqi	21	18	21
4	(China) Huang Yuxiang	13	21	10

Second Round
(China) Liu Haichao	19	18
(China) Shi Yuqi	21	21

==== Qualifier 4 ====
First Round
(China) Zhu Siyuan	21	21
(Egypt) Ali Ahmed El Khateeb	7	10
(China) Guo Kai
2	(Japan) Kenichi Tago	P	M	D

Second Round
(China) Zhu Siyuan	21	20	16
(China) Guo Kai	14	22	21

=== Top half ===
First Round
1	(China) Chen L	21	21
(India) A Jayaram	12	11
(Chinese Taipei) Hsu J-h	21	19	21
(Germany) M Zwiebler	14	21	14
7	(Denmark) V Axelsen	18	21	21
(Hong Kong) Wei N	21	11	18
(Indonesia) T Sugiarto	21	13	12
(Hong Kong) Wong W K	18	21	21
4	(Japan) K Momota	18	21	21
(China) Wang ZM	21	16	19
(South Korea) Son W-h	21	21
(Japan) S Sasaki	8	19
PFQ	(Republic of Ireland) S Evans	14	21	20
(South Korea) Lee D-k	21	18	22
PFQ	(Japan) K Tago	21	6	16
Q3	(China) Shi YQ	14	21	21

Second Round
1	(China) Chen L	21	21
(Chinese Taipei) Hsu J-h	5	8
7	(Denmark) V Axelsen	21	19	21
(Hong Kong) Wong W K	14	21	19
4	(Japan) K Momota	15	14
(South Korea) Son W-h	21	21
(South Korea) Lee D-k	19	16
Q3	(China) Shi YQ	21	21

Quarterfinals
1	(China) Chen L	21	21
7	(Denmark) V Axelsen	17	13
(South Korea) Son W-h	21	11	21
Q3	(China) Shi YQ	19	21	18

Semifinals
1	(China) Chen L	21	21
(South Korea) Son W-h	11	17

=== Bottom half ===
First Round
(Thailand) B Ponsana	21	21
(China) Tian HW	19	18
(Hong Kong) Hu Y	21	21
5	(India) K. Srikanth	12	18
(France) B Leverdez	13	21	21
Q1	(China) Zhou ZQ	21	15	18
Q2	(China) Qiao B	21	8	16
3	(China) Lin D	11	21	21
(Malaysia) Lee C W	21	21
(Hong Kong) Ng K L	10	15
(China) Xue S	21	15	17
6	(Chinese Taipei) Chou T-c	12	21	21
(India) H. S. Prannoy	14	21	19
Q4	(China) Guo K	21	17	21
(Japan) T Ueda	13	13
2	(Denmark) J Ø Jørgensen	21	21

Second Round
(Thailand) B Ponsana	21	19	9
(Hong Kong) Hu Y	13	21	21
(France) B Leverdez	6	10
3	(China) Lin D	21	21
(Malaysia) Lee C W	21	15	21
6	(Chinese Taipei) Chou T-c	9	21	12
Q4	(China) Guo K	19	19
2	(Denmark) J Ø Jørgensen	21	21

Quarterfinals
(Hong Kong) Hu Y	8	21	17
3	(China) Lin D	21	10	21
(Malaysia) Lee C W	21	11	21
2	(Denmark) J Ø Jørgensen	11	21	10

Semifinals
3	(China) Lin D	21	19	19
(Malaysia) Lee C W	17	21	21

=== Finals ===
Semifinals
1	(China) Chen Long	21	21
(South Korea) Son Wan-ho	11	17
3	(China) Lin Dan	21	19	19
(Malaysia) Lee Chong Wei	17	21	21

Final
1	(China) Chen Long	15	11
(Malaysia) Lee Chong Wei	21	21

== Women's singles ==
=== Seeds ===
1. (India) Saina Nehwal (final)
2. (Spain) Carolina Marin (quarterfinals)
3. (South Korea) Sung Ji-hyun (quarterfinals)
4. (Chinese Taipei) Tai Tzu-ying (quarterfinals)
5. (China) Wang Shixian (semifinals)
6. (China) Li Xuerui (champion)
7. (China) Wang Yihan (semifinals)
8. (Thailand) Ratchanok Intanon (first round)
Qualification

=== Qualifying draw ===
==== Qualifier 1 ====
First Round
1	(Egypt) Hadia Hosny	P	M	D
Bye
Bye
(China) Cai Yanyan

Second Round
Bye
(China) Cai Yanyan

==== Qualifier 2 ====
First Round
4	(China) Hui Xirui
Bye
Bye
(China) Chen Xiaoxin

Second Round
(China) Hui Xirui	11	21	16
(China) Chen Xiaoxin	21	16	21

==== Qualifier 3 ====
First Round
(China) Li Wenmei	21	18	15
(Chinese Taipei) Chen Hsiao-huan	15	21	21
Bye
3	(Egypt) Doha Hany

Second Round
(Chinese Taipei) Chen Hsiao-huan	21	21
3	(Egypt) Doha Hany	4	6

==== Qualifier 4 ====
First Round
Bye
(China) Zhang Yiman
Bye
2	(China) Shen Yaying	P	M	D

Second Round
(China) Zhang Yiman
Bye

=== Top half ===
First Round
1	(India) S Nehwal	22	21
(China) Sun Y	20	18
(Malaysia) Tee J Y	21	22
Q3	(Chinese Taipei) Chen H-h	17	20
8	(Thailand) R Intanon	15	19
(Japan) N Okuhara	21	21
Q2	(China) Chen XX	18	21	21
(Chinese Taipei) Hsu Y-c	21	9	19
4	(Chinese Taipei) Tai T-y	21	21
Q1	(China) Cai YY	13	14
(Thailand) B Ongbumrungpan	15	21	14
(Japan) A Yamaguchi	21	19	21
7	(China) Wang YH	21	21
PFQ	(Egypt) H Hosny	3	4
(Japan) M Mitani	19	21	21
(United States) Zhang BW	21	3	8

Second Round
1	(India) S Nehwal	21	19	21
(Malaysia) Tee J Y	10	21	19
(Japan) N Okuhara	21	21
Q2	(China) Chen XX	16	7
4	(Chinese Taipei) Tai T-y	21	21
(Japan) A Yamaguchi	15	19
7	(China) Wang YH	21	21
(Japan) M Mitani	14	10

Quarterfinals
1	(India) S Nehwal	21	21
(Japan) N Okuhara	16	13
4	(Chinese Taipei) Tai T-y	18	17
7	(China) Wang YH	21	21

Semifinals
1	(India) S Nehwal	21	21
7	(China) Wang YH	13	18

=== Bottom half ===
First Round
(Chinese Taipei) Pai Y-p	22	21
(United States) I Wang	20	14
Q4	(China) Zhang YM	11	13
6	(China) Li XR	21	21
(Germany) K Schnaase	13	13
(Japan) Y Hashimoto	21	21
PFQ	(China) Shen YY	7	21	12
3	(South Korea) Sung J-h	21	16	21
(India) P.V. Sindhu	21	21
(Russia) K Polikarpova	14	9
(South Korea) Bae-Y-j	9	13
5	(China) Wang SX	21	21
(United States) R Schafer	11	16
(Canada) M Li	21	21
(Indonesia) M F Kusumastuti	10	10
2	(Spain) C Marín	21	21

Second Round
(Chinese Taipei) Pai Y-p	18	14
6	(China) Li XR	21	21
(Japan) Y Hashimoto	21	6	22
3	(South Korea) Sung J-h	15	21	24
(India) P.V. Sindhu	21	18	16
5	(China) Wang SX	18	21	21
(Canada) M Li	9	12
2	(Spain) C Marín	21	21

Quarterfinals
6	(China) Li XR	21	21
3	(South Korea) Sung J-h	16	13
5	(China) Wang SX	21	10	21
2	(Spain) C Marín	13	21	10

Semifinals
6	(China) Li XR	21	21
5	(China) Wang SX	14	5

=== Finals ===
Semifinals
1	(India) Saina Nehwal	21	21
7	(China) Wang Yihan	13	18
6	(China) Li Xuerui	21	21
5	(China) Wang Shixian	14	5

Final
1	(India) Saina Nehwal	12	15
6	(China) Li Xuerui	21	21

== Men's doubles ==
=== Seeds ===
1. (South Korea) Lee Yong-dae / Yoo Yeon-seong (second round)
2. (Indonesia) Mohammad Ahsan / Hendra Setiawan (second round)
3. (China) Fu Haifeng / Zhang Nan (withdrawn)
4. (Denmark) Mathias Boe / Carsten Mogensen (quarterfinals)
5. (Japan) Hiroyuki Endo / Kenichi Hayakawa (semifinals)
6. (China) Chai Biao / Hong Wei (final)
7. (China) Liu Xiaolong / Qiu Zihan (second round)
8. (Chinese Taipei) Lee Sheng-mu / Tsai Chia-hsin (first round)

=== Top half ===
First Round
(China) Li JH (China) Liu YC	23	21
(Japan) T Kamura (Japan) K Sonoda	21	17
7	(China) Liu XL (China) Qiu ZH	21	15	27
(Indonesia) A Pratama (Indonesia) R K Suwardi	12	21	25
(Chinese Taipei) Chen H-l (Chinese Taipei) Wang C-l	12	21	19
(South Korea) Ko S-h (South Korea) Shin B-c	21	17	21
3	(China) Fu HF (China) Zhang N
(Japan) H Hashimoto (Japan) N Hirata	w	/	o
(India) M Attri (India) B S Reddy
(Malaysia) Koo K K (Malaysia) Tan B H	w	/	o
6	(China) Chai B (China) Hong W	21	21
(Egypt) A A El Khateeb (Egypt) A Kashkal	9	4
(China) Huang KX (China) Wang SJ	23	14	22
(Germany) M Fuchs (Germany) J Schöttler	21	21	20

Second Round
1	(South Korea) Lee Y-d (South Korea) Yoo Y-s	21	18	21
(China) Li JH (China) Liu YC	18	21	23
7	(China) Liu XL (China) Qiu ZH	5	21	14
(South Korea) Ko S-h (South Korea) Shin B-c	21	18	21
(Japan) H Hashimoto (Japan) N Hirata	21	22
(Malaysia) Koo K K (Malaysia) Tan B H	12	20
6	(China) Chai B (China) Hong W	21	21
(China) Huang KX (China) Wang SJ	17	18

Quarterfinals
(China) Li JH (China) Liu YC	18	14
(South Korea) Ko S-h (South Korea) Shin B-c	21	21
(Japan) H Hashimoto (Japan) N Hirata	16	11
6	(China) Chai B (China) Hong W	21	21

Semifinals
(South Korea) Ko S-h (South Korea) Shin B-c	15	19
6	(China) Chai B (China) Hong W	21	21

=== Bottom half ===
First Round
(Denmark) K Astrup (Denmark) A S Rasmussen	21	21
(United States) P Chew (United States) S Pongnairat	10	16
(South Korea) Kim G-j (South Korea) Kim S-r	21	19	21
8	(Chinese Taipei) Lee S-m (Chinese Taipei) Tsai C-h	12	21	18
(Malaysia) Goh V S (Malaysia) Tan W K	21	21
(Netherlands) R Bosch (New Zealand) O Leydon-Davis	16	11
(Malaysia) Hoon T H (Malaysia) Lim K W	16	21	13
4	(Denmark) M Boe (Denmark) C Mogensen	21	18	21
(Hong Kong) Chan Y L (Hong Kong) Lee C H	15	19
(China) Cai Y (China) Lu K	21	21
(Chinese Taipei) Liao M-c (Chinese Taipei) Tseng M-h	21	13
5	(Japan) H Endo (Japan) K Hayakawa	23	21
(Chinese Taipei) Huang P-j (Chinese Taipei) Tien T-c	15	8
(China) Wang YL (China) Zhang W	21	21
(Denmark) M Conrad-Petersen (Denmark) M Pieler Kolding	19	11
2	(Indonesia) M Ahsan (Indonesia) H Setiawan	21	21

Second Round
(Denmark) K Astrup (Denmark) A S Rasmussen	16	13
(South Korea) Kim G-j (South Korea) Kim S-r	21	21
(Malaysia) Goh V S (Malaysia) Tan W K	21	16	12
4	(Denmark) M Boe (Denmark) C Mogensen	17	21	21
(China) Cai Y (China) Lu K	18	13
5	(Japan) H Endo (Japan) K Hayakawa	21	21
(China) Wang YL (China) Zhang W	15	21	21
2	(Indonesia) M Ahsan (Indonesia) H Setiawan	21	11	14

Quarterfinals
(South Korea) Kim G-j (South Korea) Kim S-r	19	21	21
4	(Denmark) M Boe (Denmark) C Mogensen	21	13	9
5	(Japan) H Endo (Japan) K Hayakawa	21	21
(China) Wang YL (China) Zhang W	11	14

Semifinals
(South Korea) Kim G-j (South Korea) Kim S-r	21	21
5	(Japan) H Endo (Japan) K Hayakawa	17	18

=== Finals ===
Semifinals
(South Korea) Ko Sung-hyun (South Korea) Shin Baek-cheol	15	19
6	(China) Chai Biao (China) Hong Wei	21	21
(South Korea) Kim Gi-jung (South Korea) Kim Sa-rang	21	21
5	(Japan) Hiroyuki Endo (Japan) Kenichi Hayakawa	17	18

Final
6	(China) Chai Biao (China) Hong Wei	13	19
(South Korea) Kim Gi-jung (South Korea) Kim Sa-rang	21	21

== Women's doubles ==
=== Seeds ===
1. (Japan) Misaki Matsutomo / Ayaka Takahashi (final)
2. (China) Luo Ying / Luo Yu (quarterfinals)
3. (Denmark) Christinna Pedersen / Kamilla Rytter Juhl (quarterfinals)
4. (Indonesia) Nitya Krishinda Maheswari / Greysia Polii (second round)
5. (China) Tian Qing / Zhao Yunlei (semifinals)
6. (Japan) Reika Kakiiwa / Miyuki Maeda (first round)
7. (Netherlands) Eefje Muskens / Selena Piek (second round)
8. (China) Huang Yaqiong / Wang Xiaoli (withdrawn)

=== Top half ===
First Round
(Malaysia) Vivian Hoo K M (Malaysia) Woon K W	14	16
(South Korea) Chae Y-j (South Korea) Kim S-y	21	21
8	(China) Huang YQ (China) Wang XL
(South Korea) Jung K-e (South Korea) Shin S-c	w	/	o
(Malaysia) A A Anscelly (Malaysia) Soong F C	21	21
(Egypt) D Hany (Egypt) H Hosny	7	8
(Japan) N Fukuman (Japan) K Yonao	21	21
(India) J Gutta (India) A Ponnappa	16	11
6	(Japan) R Kakiiwa (Japan) M Maeda	10	4
(South Korea) Chang Y-n (South Korea) Lee S-h	21	21
(Germany) I Herttrich (Germany) B Michels
(China) Tang JH (China) Zhong QX	w	/	o

Second Round
1	(Japan) M Matsutomo (Japan) A Takahashi	14	21	21
(South Korea) Chae Y-j (South Korea) Kim S-y	21	11	5
(South Korea) Jung K-e (South Korea) Shin S-c	18	19
(Malaysia) A A Anscelly (Malaysia) Soong F C	21	21
3	(Denmark) C Pedersen (Denmark) K Rytter Juhl	21	21
(Japan) N Fukuman (Japan) K Yonao	10	13
(South Korea) Chang Y-n (South Korea) Lee S-h	21	21	21
(China) Tang JH (China) Zhong QX	15	23	12

Quarterfinals
1	(Japan) M Matsutomo (Japan) A Takahashi	21	21
(Malaysia) A A Anscelly (Malaysia) Soong F C	17	12
3	(Denmark) C Pedersen (Denmark) K Rytter Juhl	18	16
(South Korea) Chang Y-n (South Korea) Lee S-h	21	21

Semifinals
1	(Japan) M Matsutomo (Japan) A Takahashi	21	21
(South Korea) Chang Y-n (South Korea) Lee S-h	18	17

=== Bottom half ===
First Round
(Thailand) J Kittiharakul (Thailand) R Prajongjai	8	21	12
(China) Huang DP (China) Ou DN	21	13	21
(Chinese Taipei) Hsieh P-c (Chinese Taipei) Wu T-j	19	14
7	(Netherlands) E Muskens (Netherlands) S Piek	21	21
(China) Tang YT (China) Yu Y	w	/	o
(Germany) J Goliszewski (Germany) C Nelte
(South Korea) Go A-r (South Korea) Yoo H-w	21	21
(Chinese Taipei) Hsu Y-c (Chinese Taipei) Pai Y-p	12	15
(England) H Olver (England) L Smith	14	8
5	(China) Tian Q (China) Zhao YL	21	21
(Hong Kong) Poon L Y (Hong Kong) Tse Y S	21	21
(United States) E Lee (United States) P L Obanana	19	9

Second Round
(China) Huang DP (China) Ou DN	21	21
7	(Netherlands) E Muskens (Netherlands) S Piek	13	16
(China) Tang YT (China) Yu Y	21	21
4	(Indonesia) N K Maheswari (Indonesia) G Polii	10	16
(South Korea) Go A-r (South Korea) Yoo H-w	7	11
5	(China) Tian Q (China) Zhao YL	21	21
(Hong Kong) Poon L Y (Hong Kong) Tse Y S	19	21	14
2	(China) Luo Y (China) Luo Y	21	13	21

Quarterfinals
(China) Huang DP (China) Ou DN	9	17
(China) Tang YT (China) Yu Y	21	21
5	(China) Tian Q (China) Zhao YL	16	21	21
2	(China) Luo Y (China) Luo Y	21	15	12

Semifinals
(China) Tang YT (China) Yu Y	21	21
5	(China) Tian Q (China) Zhao YL	13	19

=== Finals ===
Semifinals
1	(Japan) Misaki Matsutomo (Japan) Ayaka Takahashi	21	21
(South Korea) Chang Ye-na (South Korea) Lee So-hee	18	17
(China) Tang Yuanting (China) Yu Yang	21	21
5	(China) Tian Qing (China) Zhao Yunlei	13	19

Final
1	(Japan) Misaki Matsutomo (Japan) Ayaka Takahashi	21	13	12
(China) Tang Yuanting (China) Yu Yang	18	21	21

== Mixed doubles ==
=== Seeds ===
1. (China) Zhang Nan / Zhao Yunlei (champion)
2. (Indonesia) Tantowi Ahmad / Liliyana Natsir (first round)
3. (China) Xu Chen / Ma Jin (semifinals)
4. (China) Liu Cheng / Bao Yixin (semifinals)
5. (Denmark) Joachim Fischer Nielsen / Christinna Pedersen (final)
6. (England) Chris Adcock / Gabrielle Adcock (quarterfinals)
7. (South Korea) Ko Sung-hyun / Kim Ha-na (second round)
8. (China) Lu Kai / Huang Yaqiong (second round)
Qualification

=== Qualifying draw ===
==== Qualifier 1 ====
Final QualiFication Round
1	(Chinese Taipei) Liao Min-chun (Chinese Taipei) Chen Hsiao-huan	P	M	D
	Bye

==== Qualifier 2 ====
Final QualiFication Round
(Egypt) Ali Ahmed El Khateeb (Egypt) Doha Hany	5	3
(China) Liu Yuchen (China) Ou Dongni	21	21

==== Qualifier 3 ====
Final QualiFication Round
(South Korea) Yoo Yeon-seong (South Korea) Chang Ye-na	21	21
(Egypt) Abdelrahman Kashkal (Egypt) Hadia Hosny	11	11

==== Qualifier 4 ====
Final QualiFication Round
	(Japan) Kenta Kazuno (Japan) Ayane Kurihara	21	21
2	(South Korea) Kim Gi-jung (South Korea) Shin Seung-chan	11	17

=== Top half ===
First Round
1	(China) Zhang N (China) Zhao YL	21	21
(United States) P Chew (United States) J Subandhi	12	10
(South Korea) Lee Y-d (South Korea) Lee S-h	22	21
(Russia) E Dremin (Russia) E Dimova	20	17
7	(South Korea) Ko S-h (South Korea) Kim H-n	21	21
(Indonesia) M Kido (Indonesia) P Z Bernadeth	10	12
(Indonesia) P Jordan (Indonesia) D Susanto	24	20	21
(Japan) K Hayakawa (Japan) M Matsutomo	22	22	13
3	(China) Xu C (China) Ma J	21	21
(Indonesia) R Widianto (Indonesia) R P Dili	13	10
Q3	(South Korea) Yoo Y-s (South Korea) Chang Y-n
Q1	BYE
8	(China) Lu K (China) Huang YQ	21	21
(Singapore) D B Chrisnanta (Singapore) Vanessa Neo Y Y	18	17
(Denmark) N Nohr (Denmark) S Thygesen	21	21
(Thailand) S Prapakamol (Thailand) S Thoungthongkam	18	19

Second Round
1	(China) Zhang N (China) Zhao YL	17	21	21
(South Korea) Lee Y-d (South Korea) Lee S-h	21	13	16
7	(South Korea) Ko S-h (South Korea) Kim H-n	21	11	16
(Indonesia) P Jordan (Indonesia) D Susanto	15	21	21
3	(China) Xu C (China) Ma J	21	21
Q3	(South Korea) Yoo Y-s (South Korea) Chang Y-n	19	15
8	(China) Lu K (China) Huang YQ	14	17
(Denmark) N Nohr (Denmark) S Thygesen	21	21

Quarterfinals
1	(China) Zhang N (China) Zhao YL	19	21	21
(Indonesia) P Jordan (Indonesia) D Susanto	21	13	16
3	(China) Xu C (China) Ma J	27	21
(Denmark) N Nohr (Denmark) S Thygesen	25	19

Semifinals
1	(China) Zhang N (China) Zhao YL	21	21
3	(China) Xu C (China) Ma J	19	11

=== Bottom half ===
First Round
PFQ	(Chinese Taipei) Liao M-c (Chinese Taipei) Chen H-h	15	21	18
(China) Huang KX (China) Huang DP	21	17	21
(South Korea) Shin B-c (South Korea) Chae Y-j	20	21	17
6	(England) C Adcock (England) G Adcock	22	17	21
(Malaysia) Chan P S (Malaysia) Goh L Y	21	18
(Hong Kong) Lee C H (Hong Kong) Chau H W	23	21
(Japan) K Sonoda (Japan) N Fukuman	8	21	7
4	(China) Liu C (China) Bao YX	21	19	21
(Hong Kong) Chan Y L (Hong Kong) Tse Y S	23	21
Q4	(Japan) K Kazuno (Japan) A Kurihara	21	11
(Netherlands) J Arends (Netherlands) S Piek	10	16
5	(Denmark) J Fischer Nielsen (Denmark) C Pedersen	21	21
(South Korea) Choi S-g (South Korea) Eom H-w	16	15
Q2	(China) Liu YC (China) Ou DN	21	21
(Germany) M Fuchs (Germany) B Michels	21	22
2	(Indonesia) T Ahmad (Indonesia) L Natsir	19	20

Second Round
(China) Huang KX (China) Huang DP	10	21
6	(England) C Adcock (England) G Adcock	21	23
(Hong Kong) Lee C H (Hong Kong) Chau H W	16	14
4	(China) Liu C (China) Bao YX	21	21
(Hong Kong) Chan Y L (Hong Kong) Tse Y S	13	13
5	(Denmark) J Fischer Nielsen (Denmark) C Pedersen	21	21
Q2	(China) Liu YC (China) Ou DN	21	13	21
(Germany) M Fuchs (Germany) B Michels	18	21	9

Quarterfinals
6	(England) C Adcock (England) G Adcock	10	18
4	(China) Liu C (China) Bao YX	21	21
5	(Denmark) J Fischer Nielsen (Denmark) C Pedersen	21	24
Q2	(China) Liu YC (China) Ou DN	13	22

Semifinals
4	(China) Liu C (China) Bao YX	16	19
5	(Denmark) J Fischer Nielsen (Denmark) C Pedersen	21	21

=== Finals ===
Semifinals
1	(China) Zhang Nan (China) Zhao Yunlei	21	21
3	(China) Xu Chen (China) Ma Jin	19	11
4	(China) Liu Cheng (China) Bao Yixin	16	19
5	(Denmark) Joachim Fischer Nielsen (Denmark) Christinna Pedersen	21	21

Final
1	(China) Zhang Nan (China) Zhao Yunlei	21	17	21
5	(Denmark) Joachim Fischer Nielsen (Denmark) Christinna Pedersen	19	21	19

Preceded by 2014 China Open Super Series Premier	China Open	Succeeded by 2016 China Open Super Series Premier
Preceded by 2015 French Super Series	BWF Super Series; 2015 BWF Season	Succeeded by 2015 Hong Kong Super Series
