= Kim Gi-jung =

South Korean badminton player (born 1990)

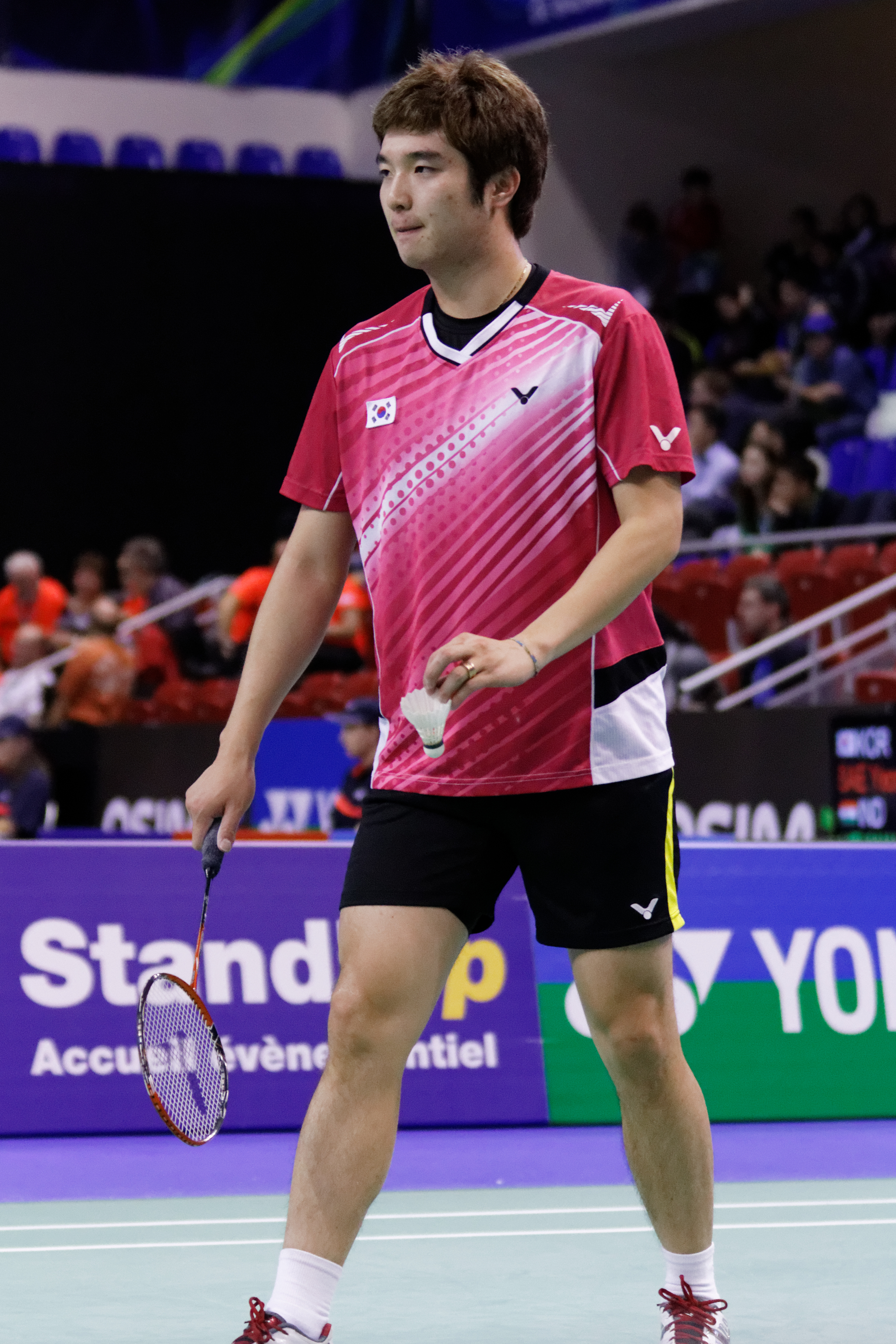
- Kim at the 2013 French Super Series

Personal information
- Born: 14 August 1990 (age 36) Dangjin, South Chungcheong, South Korea
- Height: 1.79 m (5 ft 10 in)
- Weight: 72 kg (159 lb)

Sport
- Country: South Korea
- Sport: Badminton
- Handedness: Right

Men's & mixed doubles
- Highest ranking: 2 (MD with Kim Sa-rang 22 September 2016); 19 (XD with Shin Seung-chan 26 January 2017)
- Current ranking: 62 (MD with Kim Sa-rang 4 March 2025)
- BWF profile
Medal record
Men's badminton
Representing South Korea
World Championships
Bronze medal – third place	2013 Guangzhou	Men's doubles
Bronze medal – third place	2014 Copenhagen	Men's doubles
Sudirman Cup
Silver medal – second place	2013 Kuala Lumpur	Mixed team
Bronze medal – third place	2015 Dongguan	Mixed team
Thomas Cup
Silver medal – second place	2012 Wuhan	Men's team
Bronze medal – third place	2016 Kunshan	Men's team
Asian Games
Gold medal – first place	2014 Incheon	Men's team
Silver medal – second place	2010 Guangzhou	Men's team
Bronze medal – third place	2014 Incheon	Men's doubles
Asian Championships
Gold medal – first place	2012 Qingdao	Men's doubles
Silver medal – second place	2013 Taipei	Men's doubles
Bronze medal – third place	2015 Wuhan	Men's doubles
Asia Mixed Team Championships
Silver medal – second place	2017 Ho Chi Minh	Mixed team
Asia Team Championships
Bronze medal – third place	2016 Hyderabad	Men's team
East Asian Games
Silver medal – second place	2009 Hong Kong	Mixed team
Bronze medal – third place	2009 Hong Kong	Men's doubles
Summer Universiade
Gold medal – first place	2013 Kazan	Mixed doubles
Gold medal – first place	2013 Kazan	Mixed team
Gold medal – first place	2015 Gwangju	Men's doubles
Gold medal – first place	2015 Gwangju	Mixed doubles
Gold medal – first place	2015 Gwangju	Mixed team
Bronze medal – third place	2013 Kazan	Men's doubles
World Junior Championships
Gold medal – first place	2006 Incheon	Mixed team
Silver medal – second place	2007 Waitakere City	Mixed team
Silver medal – second place	2008 Pune	Mixed team
Bronze medal – third place	2006 Incheon	Boys' doubles
Bronze medal – third place	2008 Pune	Mixed doubles
Asian Junior Championships
Silver medal – second place	2008 Kuala Lumpur	Boys' doubles
Silver medal – second place	2008 Kuala Lumpur	Mixed doubles
Silver medal – second place	2008 Kuala Lumpur	Mixed team

Korean name
- Hangul: 김기정
- RR: Gim Gijeong
- MR: Kim Kijŏng
- IPA: [kim.ɡi.dʑʌŋ] or [kim] [ki.dʑʌŋ]

Kim Gi-jung or Kim Ki-jung (Korean: 김기정; born 14 August 1990) is a South Korean badminton player. He competed at the Rio 2016 Summer Olympics in the men's doubles event.

== Career ==
In 2008, he won a bronze medal at the World Junior Championships in the mixed doubles event partnered with Eom Hye-Won. In 2009, he competed at the Hong Kong East Asian Games and won a silver medal in the men's team event and a bronze medal in the men's doubles event partnered with Kwon Yi-goo. In 2011, he won the Turkey International tournament in the men's doubles event with Kim Sa-rang.

In 2012, he and Kim Sa-rang won their first Superseries title at the Japan Open tournament. In the final round they beat the Malaysian pair Koo Kien Keat and Tan Boon Heong. At the 2012 Badminton Asia Championships in Qingdao, China, they won a gold medal after defeat Hiroyuki Endo and Kenichi Hayakawa of Japan in the final round. In September 2012, they also won men's doubles title at the Indonesian Masters tournament.

In 2013, he became the champion at the Chinese Taipei and South Korea Grand Prix Gold tournament. At the Chinese Taipei, he and Kim Sa-rang beat the host partner Lee Sheng-mu and Tsai Chia-hsin in the straight set. At the Korea, they won the title after beat their compatriots Ko Sung-hyun and Shin Baek-cheol with the score 2–1. He also won a silver medal at the 2013 Badminton Asia Championships in Taipei. At the 2013 BWF World Championships in Guangzhou, he and his partner were seeded fifth in that tournament. They beat the second seeded of Malaysia in the quarterfinal round, and in the semifinal round they were defeated by Boe and Mogensen in three sets, and settle for the bronze medal. At the end of the 2013 BWF Season, he qualified to compete at the Super Series Masters Finals in Kuala Lumpur, Malaysia. Finally, he became the runner-up in the men's doubles event after defeated by Mohammad Ahsan and Hendra Setiawan of Indonesia.

In 2014, he and Lee Yong-dae have been handed one year suspensions for missing doping tests under the BWF Anti-Doping Regulations. He and Lee were required to provide whereabouts information for the BWF to conduct out-of-competition testing. In 2013, both athletes accumulated three whereabouts failures in connection with this administrative process. The Korea Badminton Association imposed $41,170 penalty for administrative failures. The panels that manage the doping tests reconsidered the case and decided to lift the punishment. The information and evidence presented at the January hearing was insufficient and ambiguous and there was no proof beyond reasonable doubt that the players were not at fault. In April 2014, after reviewing its original decision, the BWF panel wiped out the players missed tests and filing failures and expunged their records.

In 2015, he and Kim Sa-rang won the Korea Masters Grand Prix Gold tournament in the men's doubles event. In the final round they beat Ko Sung-hyun and Shin Baek-cheol with the score 16–21, 21–18, 21–19. They also won the China Open Super Series Premier tournament, after beat Chai Biao and Hong Wei in the straight games. In 2016, they also won the Superseries Premier tournament in Malaysia. He and Kim Sa-rang beat the third seeded from China in the quarterfinal round, and the world No.1 pair, Lee Yong-dae and Yoo Yeon-seong in the semifinal. In the final round they beat Chai Biao and Hong Wei with the score 21–19, 21–15. He and Kim Sa-rang competed at the Summer Olympics in the men's doubles event. They lost in the quarterfinal round, defeated by Fu Haifeng and Zhang Nan of China with the score 21–11, 18-21 and 22–24.

== Achievements ==
=== BWF World Championships ===
Men's doubles
Year	Venue	Partner	Opponent	Score	Result
2013	Tianhe Sports Center; Guangzhou, China	(South Korea) Kim Sa-rang	(Denmark) Mathias Boe (Denmark) Carsten Mogensen	23–21, 18–21, 18–21	Bronze
2014	Ballerup Super Arena; Copenhagen, Denmark	(South Korea) Kim Sa-rang	(South Korea) Ko Sung-hyun (South Korea) Shin Baek-cheol	Walkover	Bronze

=== Asian Games ===
Men's doubles
Year	Venue	Partner	Opponent	Score	Result
2014	Gyeyang Gymnasium; Incheon, South Korea	(South Korea) Kim Sa-rang	(Indonesia) Mohammad Ahsan (Indonesia) Hendra Setiawan	21–19, 16–21, 18–21	Bronze

=== Asian Championships ===
Men's doubles
Year	Venue	Partner	Opponent	Score	Result
2012	Qingdao Sports Centre Conson Stadium; Qingdao, China	(South Korea) Kim Sa-rang	(Japan) Hiroyuki Endo (Japan) Kenichi Hayakawa	21–12, 21–16	Gold
2013	Taipei Arena; Taipei, Taiwan	(South Korea) Kim Sa-rang	(South Korea) Ko Sung-hyun (South Korea) Lee Yong-dae	13–21, 20–22	Silver
2015	Wuhan Sports Center Gymnasium; Wuhan, China	(South Korea) Kim Sa-rang	(South Korea) Lee Yong-dae (South Korea) Yoo Yeon-seong	18–21, 9–21	Bronze

=== Summer Universiade ===
Men's doubles
Year	Venue	Partner	Opponent	Score	Result
2013	Tennis Academy; Kazan, Russia	(South Korea) Hong Ji-hoon	(Russia) Vladimir Ivanov (Russia) Ivan Sozonov	21–17, 11–21, 15–21	Bronze
2015	Hwasun Hanium Culture Sports Center; Hwasun, South Korea	(South Korea) Kim Sa-rang	(China) Wang Yilyu (China) Zhang Wen	21–16, 22–20	Gold

Mixed doubles
Year	Venue	Partner	Opponent	Score	Result
2013	Tennis Academy; Kazan, Russia	(South Korea) Kim So-yeong	(China) Liu Cheng (China) Tian Qing	22–20, 21–14	Gold
2015	Hwasun Hanium Culture Sports Center; Hwasun, South Korea	(South Korea) Shin Seung-chan	(Chinese Taipei) Lu Ching-yao (Chinese Taipei) Chiang Kai-hsin	21–14, 21–11	Gold

=== East Asian Games ===
Men's doubles
Year	Venue	Partner	Opponent	Score	Result
2009	Queen Elizabeth Stadium, Hong Kong	(South Korea) Kwon Yi-goo	(Chinese Taipei) Hu Chung-hsien (Chinese Taipei) Tsai Chia-hsin	13–21, 23–21, 10–21	Bronze

=== BWF World Junior Championships ===
Boys' doubles
Year	Venue	Partner	Opponent	Score	Result
2006	Samsan World Gymnasium; Incheon, South Korea	(South Korea) Lee Jung-hwan	(China) Li Tian (China) Liu Xiaolong	20–22, 21–19, 19–21	Bronze

Mixed doubles
Year	Venue	Partner	Opponent	Score	Result
2008	Shree Shiv Chhatrapati Badminton Hall; Pune, India	(South Korea) Eom Hye-won	(China) Chai Biao (China) Xie Jing	13–21, 19–21	Bronze

=== Asian Junior Championships ===
Boys' doubles
Year	Venue	Partner	Opponent	Score	Result
2008	Stadium Juara; Kuala Lumpur, Malaysia	(South Korea) Choi Young-woo	(Malaysia) Mak Hee Chun (Malaysia) Teo Kok Siang	13–21, 18–21	Silver

Mixed doubles
Year	Venue	Partner	Opponent	Score	Result
2008	Stadium Juara; Kuala Lumpur, Malaysia	(South Korea) Eom Hye-won	(China) Zhang Nan (China) Lu Lu	21–14, 15–21, 22–24	Silver

=== BWF World Tour (4 titles) ===
The BWF World Tour, which was announced on 19 March 2017 and implemented in 2018, is a series of elite badminton tournaments sanctioned by the Badminton World Federation (BWF). The BWF World Tour is divided into levels of World Tour Finals, Super 1000, Super 750, Super 500, Super 300, and the BWF Tour Super 100.

Men's doubles
Year	Tournament	Level	Partner	Opponent	Score	Result
2018	Spain Masters	Super 300	(South Korea) Lee Yong-dae	(Thailand) Bodin Isara (Thailand) Maneepong Jongjit	21–13, 21–17	(gold) Winner
2018	Macau Open	Super 300	(South Korea) Lee Yong-dae	(South Korea) Ko Sung-hyun (South Korea) Shin Baek-cheol	17–21, 21–13, 21–19	(gold) Winner
2020	Malaysia Masters	Super 500	(South Korea) Lee Yong-dae	(China) Li Junhui (China) Liu Yuchen	21–14, 21–16	(gold) Winner
2022	Korea Masters	Super 300	(South Korea) Kim Sa-rang	(China) Liu Yuchen (China) Ou Xuanyi	21–14, 21–16	(gold) Winner

=== BWF Superseries (3 titles, 4 runners-up) ===
The BWF Superseries, which was launched on 14 December 2006 and implemented in 2007, was a series of elite badminton tournaments, sanctioned by the Badminton World Federation (BWF). BWF Superseries levels were Superseries and Superseries Premier. A season of Superseries consisted of twelve tournaments around the world that had been introduced since 2011. Successful players were invited to the Superseries Finals, which were held at the end of each year.

Men's doubles
Year	Tournament	Partner	Opponent	Score	Result
2012	Japan Open	(South Korea) Kim Sa-rang	(Malaysia) Koo Kien Keat (Malaysia) Tan Boon Heong	21–16, 21–19	(gold) Winner
2013	Hong Kong Open	(South Korea) Kim Sa-rang	(South Korea) Lee Yong-dae (South Korea) Yoo Yeon-seong	21–12, 15–21, 18–21	(silver) Runner-up
2013	World Superseries Finals	(South Korea) Kim Sa-rang	(Indonesia) Mohammad Ahsan (Indonesia) Hendra Setiawan	14–21, 16–21	(silver) Runner-up
2015	Korea Open	(South Korea) Kim Sa-rang	(South Korea) Lee Yong-dae (South Korea) Yoo Yeon-seong	16–21, 12–21	(silver) Runner-up
2015	China Open	(South Korea) Kim Sa-rang	(China) Chai Biao (China) Hong Wei	21–13, 21–19	(gold) Winner
2016	Malaysia Open	(South Korea) Kim Sa-rang	(China) Chai Biao (China) Hong Wei	21–19, 21–15	(gold) Winner
2016	Japan Open	(South Korea) Ko Sung-hyun	(China) Li Junhui (China) Liu Yuchen	12–21, 12–21	(silver) Runner-up

BWF Super Series Finals tournament
BWF Super Series Premier tournament
BWF Super Series tournament

=== BWF Grand Prix (4 titles, 6 runners-up) ===
The BWF Grand Prix had two levels, the Grand Prix and Grand Prix Gold. It was a series of badminton tournaments sanctioned by the Badminton World Federation (BWF) and played between 2007 and 2017.

Men's doubles
Year	Tournament	Partner	Opponent	Score	Result
2011	German Open	(South Korea) Kim Sa-rang	(South Korea) Jung Jae-sung (South Korea) Lee Yong-dae	19–21, 21–18, 11–21	(silver) Runner-up
2012	Indonesia Grand Prix Gold	(South Korea) Kim Sa-rang	(Indonesia) Angga Pratama (Indonesia) Rian Agung Saputro	21–13, 21–9	(gold) Winner
2012	Korea Grand Prix Gold	(South Korea) Kim Sa-rang	(South Korea) Ko Sung-hyun (South Korea) Lee Yong-dae	12–21, 11–21	(silver) Runner-up
2013	Chinese Taipei Open	(South Korea) Kim Sa-rang	(Chinese Taipei) Lee Sheng-mu (Chinese Taipei) Tsai Chia-hsin	21–11, 21–11	(gold) Winner
2013	Korea Grand Prix Gold	(South Korea) Kim Sa-rang	(South Korea) Ko Sung-hyun (South Korea) Shin Baek-cheol	21–15, 18–21, 25–23	(gold) Winner
2015	Korea Masters	(South Korea) Kim Sa-rang	(South Korea) Ko Sung-hyun (South Korea) Shin Baek-cheol	16–21, 21–18, 21–19	(gold) Winner
2016	Thailand Masters	(South Korea) Kim Sa-rang	(Indonesia) Mohammad Ahsan (Indonesia) Hendra Setiawan	21–12, 15–21, 12–21	(silver) Runner-up
2016	China Masters	(South Korea) Kim Sa-rang	(South Korea) Lee Yong-dae (South Korea) Yoo Yeon-seong	17–21, 14–21	(silver) Runner-up
2017	Korea Masters	(South Korea) Jung Jae-wook	(South Korea) Kim Won-ho (South Korea) Seo Seung-jae	15–21, 16–21	(silver) Runner-up

Mixed doubles
Year	Tournament	Partner	Opponent	Score	Result
2011	Korea Grand Prix Gold	(South Korea) Jung Kyung-eun	(South Korea) Yoo Yeon-seong (South Korea) Jang Ye-na	17–21, 19–21	(silver) Runner-up

BWF Grand Prix Gold tournament
BWF Grand Prix tournament

=== BWF International Challenge/Series (2 titles, 2 runners-up) ===
Men's doubles
Year	Tournament	Partner	Opponent	Score	Result
2006	Mongolian Satellite	(South Korea) Lee Jung-hwan	(South Korea) Jeon Jun-bum (South Korea) Yoo Yeon-seong	14–21, 14–21	(silver) Runner-up
2010	Vietnam International	(South Korea) Shin Baek-choel	(Malaysia) Goh V Shem (Malaysia) Teo Kok Siang	23–21, 17–21, 19–21	(silver) Runner-up
2011	Turkey International	(South Korea) Kim Sa-rang	(South Korea) Cho Gun-woo (South Korea) Shin Baek-choel	21–17, 16–21, 21–15	(gold) Winner
2021	Welsh International	(South Korea) Kim Sa-rang	(Malaysia) Man Wei Chong (Malaysia) Tee Kai Wun	21–18, 18–21, 21–15	(gold) Winner

BWF International Challenge tournament
BWF International Series tournament
