= 2013 BWF World Championships – Men's doubles =

Badminton tournament

Men's doubles at the 2013 BWF World Championships
- Venue: Tianhe Sports Center
- Location: Guangzhou, China
- Dates: August 5, 2013 – August 11, 2013

Medalists
gold medal	Mohammad Ahsan; Hendra Setiawan	Indonesia
silver medal	Mathias Boe; Carsten Mogensen	Denmark
bronze medal	Cai Yun; Fu Haifeng	China
bronze medal	Kim Ki-jung; Kim Sa-rang	South Korea

The men's doubles tournament of the 2013 BWF World Championships (World Badminton Championships) was held from August 5 to 11. Cai Yun and Fu Haifeng were the defending champions.

Indonesians Mohammad Ahsan and Hendra Setiawan defeated Danes Mathias Boe and Carsten Mogensen 21–13, 23–21 in the final.

== Seeds ==
1. (South Korea) Ko Sung-hyun / Lee Yong-dae (third round)
2. (Malaysia) Koo Kien Keat / Tan Boon Heong (quarter-finals)
3. (Denmark) Mathias Boe / Carsten Mogensen (final)
4. (Japan) Hiroyuki Endo / Kenichi Hayakawa (quarter-finals)
5. (South Korea) Kim Ki-jung / Kim Sa-rang (semifinals)
6. (Indonesia) Mohammad Ahsan / Hendra Setiawan (champion)
7. (China) Liu Xiaolong / Qiu Zihan (third round)
8. (China) Cai Yun / Fu Haifeng (semifinals)

9. (China) Chai Biao / Zhang Nan (third round)
10. (Indonesia) Angga Pratama / Rian Agung Saputro (quarter-finals)
11. (Malaysia) Hoon Thien How / Tan Wee Kiong (third round)
12. (South Korea) Shin Baek-cheol / Yoo Yeon-seong (third round)
13. (Chinese Taipei) Lee Sheng-mu / Tsai Chia-hsin (quarter-finals)
14. (Russia) Vladimir Ivanov / Ivan Sozonov (second round)
15. (Indonesia) Alvent Yulianto Chandra / Markis Kido (third round)
16. (Thailand) Maneepong Jongjit / Nipitphon Puangpuapech (withdrew)

Click on the seed number of a player to go to their draw section.

== Draw ==
=== Finals ===
Quarterfinals
13	(Chinese Taipei) Lee Sheng-mu (Chinese Taipei) Tsai Chia-hsin	14	18
6	(Indonesia) Mohammad Ahsan (Indonesia) Hendra Setiawan	21	21
4	(Japan) Hiroyuki Endo (Japan) Kenichi Hayakawa	13	20
8	(China) Cai Yun (China) Fu Haifeng	21	22
10	(Indonesia) Angga Pratama (Indonesia) Rian Agung Saputro	13	21	17
3	(Denmark) Mathias Boe (Denmark) Carsten Mogensen	21	11	21
5	(South Korea) Kim Ki-jung (South Korea) Kim Sa-rang	21	21
2	(Malaysia) Koo Kien Keat (Malaysia) Tan Boon Heong	15	16

Semifinals
6	(Indonesia) Mohammad Ahsan (Indonesia) Hendra Setiawan	21	21
8	(China) Cai Yun (China) Fu Haifeng	19	17
3	(Denmark) Mathias Boe (Denmark) Carsten Mogensen	21	21	21
5	(South Korea) Kim Ki-jung (South Korea) Kim Sa-rang	23	18	18

Final
6	(Indonesia) Mohammad Ahsan (Indonesia) Hendra Setiawan	21	23
3	(Denmark) Mathias Boe (Denmark) Carsten Mogensen	13	21

=== Section 1 ===
First Round
(Denmark) Rasmus Bonde (Denmark) Mads Conrad-Petersen	14	25	21
(Indonesia) Yonathan Suryatama Dasuki (Indonesia) Hendra Aprida Gunawan	21	23	18
(New Zealand) Kevin Dennerly-Minturn (New Zealand) Oliver Leydon-Davis	13	14
(Germany) Ingo Kindervater (Germany) Johannes Schöttler	21	21
(Philippines) Ronel Estanislao (Philippines) Paul Jefferson Vivas	20	21	21
(Ukraine) Gennadiy Natarov (Ukraine) Artem Pochtarev	22	19	15
(India) Tarun Kona (India) Arun Vishnu
(Poland) Adam Cwalina (Poland) Przemyslaw Wacha	w/o

Second Round
1	(South Korea) Ko Sung-hyun (South Korea) Lee Yong-dae	21	21
(Denmark) Rasmus Bonde (Denmark) Mads Conrad-Petersen	12	16
13	(Chinese Taipei) Lee Sheng-mu (Chinese Taipei) Tsai Chia-hsin	16	21	21
(Germany) Ingo Kindervater (Germany) Johannes Schöttler	21	14	10
6	(Indonesia) Mohammad Ahsan (Indonesia) Hendra Setiawan	21	21
(Philippines) Ronel Estanislao (Philippines) Paul Jefferson Vivas	9	12
15	(Indonesia) Alvent Yulianto Chandra (Indonesia) Markis Kido	21	13	21
(India) Tarun Kona (India) Arun Vishnu	15	21	17

Third Round
1	(South Korea) Ko Sung-hyun (South Korea) Lee Yong-dae	21	14	19
13	(Chinese Taipei) Lee Sheng-mu (Chinese Taipei) Tsai Chia-hsin	14	21	21
6	(Indonesia) Mohammad Ahsan (Indonesia) Hendra Setiawan	21	21
15	(Indonesia) Alvent Yulianto Chandra (Indonesia) Markis Kido	19	17

Quarterfinals
13	(Chinese Taipei) Lee Sheng-mu (Chinese Taipei) Tsai Chia-hsin	14	18
6	(Indonesia) Mohammad Ahsan (Indonesia) Hendra Setiawan	21	21

=== Section 2 ===
First Round
(England) Chris Langridge (England) Peter Mills	21	21
(Hong Kong) Chan Tsz Kit (Hong Kong) Lo Lok Kei	12	15
(Malaysia) Mohd Zakry Abdul Latif (Malaysia) Mohd Fairuzizuan Mohd Tazari	21	13	21
(United States) Phillip Chew (United States) Sattawat Pongnairat	14	21	10
(Belgium) Mattijs Dierickx (Belgium) Freek Golinski
(Thailand) Songphon Anugritayawon (Thailand) Sudket Prapakamol	w/o
(Malaysia) Goh V Shem (Malaysia) Lim Khim Wah	22	21
(Scotland) Martin Campbell (Scotland) Patrick MacHugh	20	17

Second Round
4	(Japan) Hiroyuki Endo (Japan) Kenichi Hayakawa	21	22
(England) Chris Langridge (England) Peter Mills	7	20
14	(Russia) Vladimir Ivanov (Russia) Ivan Sozonov	21	15	16
(Malaysia) Mohd Zakry Abdul Latif (Malaysia) Mohd Fairuzizuan Mohd Tazari	14	21	21
8	(China) Cai Yun (China) Fu Haifeng	21	21
(Belgium) Mattijs Dierickx (Belgium) Freek Golinski	10	18
11	(Malaysia) Hoon Thien How (Malaysia) Tan Wee Kiong	21	21
(Malaysia) Goh V Shem (Malaysia) Lim Khim Wah	15	18

Third Round
4	(Japan) Hiroyuki Endo (Japan) Kenichi Hayakawa	23	21
(Malaysia) Mohd Zakry Abdul Latif (Malaysia) Mohd Fairuzizuan Mohd Tazari	21	7
8	(China) Cai Yun (China) Fu Haifeng	21	21
11	(Malaysia) Hoon Thien How (Malaysia) Tan Wee Kiong	19	13

Quarterfinals
4	(Japan) Hiroyuki Endo (Japan) Kenichi Hayakawa	13	20
8	(China) Cai Yun (China) Fu Haifeng	21	22

=== Section 3 ===
First Round
(Norway) Jonas Christensen (Norway) Marius Myhre	15	8
(England) Marcus Ellis (Scotland) Paul Van Rietvelde	21	21
(Japan) Hirokatsu Hashimoto (Japan) Noriyasu Hirata	21	21
(Mexico) Andres Lopez (Mexico) Lino Munoz	8	8
(England) Chris Adcock (England) Andrew Ellis	21	21
(Netherlands) Ruud Bosch (Netherlands) Koen Ridder	17	18
(Poland) Lukasz Moren (Poland) Wojciech Szkudlarczyk	w/o
(Philippines) Philip Joper Escueta (Philippines) Peter Gabriel Magnaye

Second Round
(England) Marcus Ellis (Scotland) Paul Van Rietvelde	11	8
10	(Indonesia) Angga Pratama (Indonesia) Rian Agung Saputro	21	21
(Japan) Hirokatsu Hashimoto (Japan) Noriyasu Hirata	13	15
7	(China) Liu Xiaolong (China) Qiu Zihan	21	21
(England) Chris Adcock (England) Andrew Ellis	11	21	8
9	(China) Chai Biao (China) Zhang Nan	21	17	21
(Philippines) Philip Joper Escueta (Philippines) Peter Gabriel Magnaye	11	10
3	(Denmark) Mathias Boe (Denmark) Carsten Mogensen	21	21

Third Round
10	(Indonesia) Angga Pratama (Indonesia) Rian Agung Saputro	21	21
7	(China) Liu Xiaolong (China) Qiu Zihan	19	15
9	(China) Chai Biao (China) Zhang Nan	15	18
3	(Denmark) Mathias Boe (Denmark) Carsten Mogensen	21	21

Quarterfinals
10	(Indonesia) Angga Pratama (Indonesia) Rian Agung Saputro	13	21	17
3	(Denmark) Mathias Boe (Denmark) Carsten Mogensen	21	11	21

=== Section 4 ===
First Round
(Russia) Evgenij Dremin (Russia) Sergey Lunev
(Wales) Daniel Font (Wales) Oliver Gwilt	w/o
(China) Hong Wei (China) Shen Ye	20	19
(Chinese Taipei) Chen Hung-ling (Chinese Taipei) Lu Chia-bin	22	21
(Hong Kong) Lee Chun Hei (Hong Kong) Ng Ka Long	24	21
(Canada) Adrian Liu (Canada) Derrick Ng	22	19
(Germany) Peter Kaesbauer (Germany) Josche Zurwonne	w/o
(India) Pranaav Jerry Chopra (India) Akshay Dewalkar	w/o

Second Round
(Russia) Evgenij Dremin (Russia) Sergey Lunev	17	12
12	(South Korea) Shin Baek-cheol (South Korea) Yoo Yeon-seong	21	21
(Chinese Taipei) Chen Hung-ling (Chinese Taipei) Lu Chia-bin	9	11
5	(South Korea) Kim Ki-jung (South Korea) Kim Sa-rang	21	21
(Hong Kong) Lee Chun Hei (Hong Kong) Ng Ka Long
16	(Thailand) Maneepong Jongjit (Thailand) Nipitphon Puangpuapech	w/o
Bye
2	(Malaysia) Koo Kien Keat (Malaysia) Tan Boon Heong

Third Round
12	(South Korea) Shin Baek-cheol (South Korea) Yoo Yeon-seong	21	18	18
5	(South Korea) Kim Ki-jung (South Korea) Kim Sa-rang	17	21	21
(Hong Kong) Lee Chun Hei (Hong Kong) Ng Ka Long	17	7
2	(Malaysia) Koo Kien Keat (Malaysia) Tan Boon Heong	21	21

Quarterfinals
5	(South Korea) Kim Ki-jung (South Korea) Kim Sa-rang	21	21
2	(Malaysia) Koo Kien Keat (Malaysia) Tan Boon Heong	15	16
