= Badminton at the 2014 Asian Games – Men's doubles =

Men's doubles at the 2014 Asian Games
- Venue: Gyeyang Gymnasium
- Dates: 24–28 September
- Competitors: 54 from 15 nations

Medalists
gold medal	Mohammad Ahsan; Hendra Setiawan	Indonesia
silver medal	Lee Yong-dae; Yoo Yeon-seong	South Korea
bronze medal	Goh V Shem; Tan Wee Kiong	Malaysia
bronze medal	Kim Gi-jung; Kim Sa-rang	South Korea

The badminton Men's doubles tournament at the 2014 Asian Games in Incheon took place from 24 September to 28 at Gyeyang Gymnasium.

== Schedule ==
All times are Korea Standard Time (UTC+09:00)

Date	Time	Event
Wednesday, 24 September 2014	10:20	Round of 32
Thursday, 25 September 2014	13:00	Round of 16
Friday, 26 September 2014	15:40	Quarterfinals
Saturday, 27 September 2014	17:30	Semifinals
Sunday, 28 September 2014	19:00	Gold medal match

== Results ==
Legend

- WO — Won by walkover

=== Final ===
Gold medal match
1	Lee Yong-dae (KOR); Yoo Yeon-seong (KOR)	16	21	17
2	Mohammad Ahsan (INA); Hendra Setiawan (INA)	21	16	21

=== Top half ===
Round of 32
Bishnu Katuwal (NEP); Ratnajit Tamang (NEP)	14	13
Chan Yun Lung (HKG); Law Cheuk Him (HKG)	21	21
Cai Yun (CHN); Fu Haifeng (CHN)	21	21
Pranav Chopra (IND); Akshay Dewalkar (IND)	10	15
Wan Wai Chi (MAC); Wong Chi Chong (MAC)	13	16
Irfan Saeed Bhatti (PAK); Umer Zeeshan (PAK)	21	21
5	Lee Sheng-mu (TPE); Tsai Chia-hsin (TPE)	21	12	20
Goh V Shem (MAS); Tan Wee Kiong (MAS)	15	21	22
Mohamed Ajfan Rasheed (MDV); Hassan Afsheen Shaheem (MDV)	3	4
Wannawat Ampunsuwan (THA); Patiphat Chalardchaleam (THA)	21	21

Round of 16
1	Lee Yong-dae (KOR); Yoo Yeon-seong (KOR)	21	21
Chan Yun Lung (HKG); Law Cheuk Him (HKG)	17	18
7	Angga Pratama (INA); Rian Agung Saputro (INA)	13	21	22
Cai Yun (CHN); Fu Haifeng (CHN)	21	19	20
3	Hiroyuki Endo (JPN); Kenichi Hayakawa (JPN)	21	21
Irfan Saeed Bhatti (PAK); Umer Zeeshan (PAK)	12	10
Goh V Shem (MAS); Tan Wee Kiong (MAS)	21	15	21
Wannawat Ampunsuwan (THA); Patiphat Chalardchaleam (THA)	19	21	15

Quarterfinals
1	Lee Yong-dae (KOR); Yoo Yeon-seong (KOR)	21	21
7	Angga Pratama (INA); Rian Agung Saputro (INA)	16	11
3	Hiroyuki Endo (JPN); Kenichi Hayakawa (JPN)	16	16
Goh V Shem (MAS); Tan Wee Kiong (MAS)	21	21

Semifinals
1	Lee Yong-dae (KOR); Yoo Yeon-seong (KOR)	21	21
Goh V Shem (MAS); Tan Wee Kiong (MAS)	6	15

=== Bottom half ===
Round of 32
Takeshi Kamura (JPN); Keigo Sonoda (JPN)	21	21
Liang Jui-wei (TPE); Liao Kuan-hao (TPE)	12	10
Iek U Ieong (MAC); Lou Hok Man (MAC)	10	17
8	Maneepong Jongjit (THA); Nipitphon Phuangphuapet (THA)	21	21
Ahmad Shekib Iqbal (AFG); Sayed Imran Miri (AFG)	5	12
Danny Bawa Chrisnanta (SIN); Chayut Triyachart (SIN)	21	21
Manu Attri (IND); B. Sumeeth Reddy (IND)	21	21
Mohamed Sharim (MDV); Nasheeu Sharafuddeen (MDV)	7	7
Hoon Thien How (MAS); Tan Boon Heong (MAS)
6	Liu Xiaolong (CHN); Qiu Zihan (CHN)	W	O
Lee Chun Hei (HKG); Tang Chun Man (HKG)	21	21
Bikash Shrestha (NEP); Sajan Krishna Tamrakar (NEP)	11	5

Round of 16
Takeshi Kamura (JPN); Keigo Sonoda (JPN)	21	15	21
8	Maneepong Jongjit (THA); Nipitphon Phuangphuapet (THA)	14	21	5
Danny Bawa Chrisnanta (SIN); Chayut Triyachart (SIN)	14	15
4	Kim Gi-jung (KOR); Kim Sa-rang (KOR)	21	21
Manu Attri (IND); B. Sumeeth Reddy (IND)	21	21
6	Liu Xiaolong (CHN); Qiu Zihan (CHN)	17	16
Lee Chun Hei (HKG); Tang Chun Man (HKG)	11	15
2	Mohammad Ahsan (INA); Hendra Setiawan (INA)	21	21

Quarterfinals
Takeshi Kamura (JPN); Keigo Sonoda (JPN)	15	15
4	Kim Gi-jung (KOR); Kim Sa-rang (KOR)	21	21
Manu Attri (IND); B. Sumeeth Reddy (IND)	12	19
2	Mohammad Ahsan (INA); Hendra Setiawan (INA)	21	21

Semifinals
4	Kim Gi-jung (KOR); Kim Sa-rang (KOR)	21	16	18
2	Mohammad Ahsan (INA); Hendra Setiawan (INA)	19	21	21
