= 2014 BWF World Championships – Men's doubles =

Men's doubles at the 2014 BWF World Championships
- Venue: Ballerup Super Arena
- Location: Copenhagen, Denmark
- Dates: August 25, 2014 – August 31, 2014

Medalists
gold medal	Ko Sung-hyun; Shin Baek-cheol	South Korea
silver medal	Lee Yong-dae; Yoo Yeon-seong	South Korea
bronze medal	Mathias Boe; Carsten Mogensen	Denmark
bronze medal	Kim Ki-jung; Kim Sa-rang	South Korea

The men's doubles tournament of the 2014 Copenhagen World Championships (World Badminton Championships) took place from August 25 to 31. Hendra Setiawan and Mohammad Ahsan enter the competition as the current champions.

== Seeds ==
1. (Indonesia) Mohammad Ahsan / Hendra Setiawan (withdrew)
2. (South Korea) Lee Yong-dae / Yoo Yeon-seong (final)
3. (Denmark) Mathias Boe / Carsten Mogensen (semifinals)
4. (Japan) Hiroyuki Endo / Kenichi Hayakawa (third round)
5. (South Korea) Kim Ki-jung / Kim Sa-rang (semifinals)
6. (Chinese Taipei) Lee Sheng-mu / Tsai Chia-hsin (quarterfinals)
7. (Malaysia) Hoon Thien How / Tan Wee Kiong (quarterfinals)
8. (China) Liu Xiaolong / Qiu Zihan (quarterfinals)

9. (Indonesia) Markus Fernaldi Gideon / Markis Kido (third round)
10. (Malaysia) Koo Kien Keat / Tan Boon Heong (third round)
11. (Indonesia) Angga Pratama / Rian Agung Saputro (quarterfinals)
12. (South Korea) Ko Sung-hyun / Shin Baek-cheol (champion)
13. (China) Chai Biao / Hong Wei (third round)
14. (England) Chris Adcock / Andrew Ellis (second round)
15. (Japan) Hirokatsu Hashimoto / Noriyasu Hirata (second round)
16. (Thailand) Maneepong Jongjit / Nipitphon Puangpuapech (second round)

Click on the seed number of a player to go to their draw section.

== Draw ==
=== Finals ===
Quarterfinals
11	(Indonesia) Angga Pratama (Indonesia) Rian Agung Saputro	14	13
5	(South Korea) Kim Ki-jung (South Korea) Kim Sa-rang	21	21
12	(South Korea) Ko Sung-hyun (South Korea) Shin Baek-cheol	21	21
7	(Malaysia) Hoon Thien How (Malaysia) Tan Wee Kiong	18	13
8	(China) Liu Xiaolong (China) Qiu Zihan	8	17
3	(Denmark) Mathias Boe (Denmark) Carsten Mogensen	21	21
6	(Chinese Taipei) Lee Sheng-mu (Chinese Taipei) Tsai Chia-hsin	16	13
2	(South Korea) Lee Yong-dae (South Korea) Yoo Yeon-seong	21	21

Semifinals
5	(South Korea) Kim Ki-jung (South Korea) Kim Sa-rang
12	(South Korea) Ko Sung-hyun (South Korea) Shin Baek-cheol	WO
3	(Denmark) Mathias Boe (Denmark) Carsten Mogensen	12	18
2	(South Korea) Lee Yong-dae (South Korea) Yoo Yeon-seong	21	21

Final
12	(South Korea) Ko Sung-hyun (South Korea) Shin Baek-cheol	22	21	21
2	(South Korea) Lee Yong-dae (South Korea) Yoo Yeon-seong	20	23	18

=== Section 1 ===
First Round
(Denmark) M Conrad-Petersen (Denmark) M Pieler Kolding	21	21
(Russia) V Ivanov (Russia) I Sozonov	18	18
(Hong Kong) Chan Y L (Hong Kong) Lee C H	19	21	20
(India) P J Chopra (India) A Dewalker	21	16	22
(Chinese Taipei) Chen H-l (Chinese Taipei) Lu C-b	8	23	21
(Denmark) A Skårup Rasmussen (Denmark) K Astrup Sorensen	21	21	16

Second Round
1	(Indonesia) M Ahsan (Indonesia) H Setiawan
(Thailand) W Ampunsuwan (Thailand) P Chalardchaleam	w	/	o
11	(Indonesia) A Pratama (Indonesia) R A Saputro	17	21	21
(Denmark) M Conrad-Petersen (Denmark) M Pieler Kolding	21	19	19
5	(South Korea) Kim K-j (South Korea) Kim S-r	21	21
(India) P J Chopra (India) A Dewalker	15	17
13	(China) Chai B (China) Hong W	21	22
(Chinese Taipei) Chen H-l (Chinese Taipei) Lu C-b	18	20

Third Round
(Thailand) W Ampunsuwan (Thailand) P Chalardchaleam	19	12
11	(Indonesia) A Pratama (Indonesia) R A Saputro	21	21
5	(South Korea) Kim K-j (South Korea) Kim S-r	21	7	21
13	(China) Chai B (China) Hong W	16	21	18

Quarterfinals
11	(Indonesia) A Pratama (Indonesia) R A Saputro	14	13
5	(South Korea) Kim K-j (South Korea) Kim S-r	21	21

=== Section 2 ===
First Round
(Chinese Taipei) Liang J-w (Chinese Taipei) Liao K-h	21	19	26
(Germany) P Käsbauer (Germany) J Zurwonne	15	21	28
(Australia) R Middleton (Australia) R Smith	20	24	21
(Canada) K Li (Canada) N Yakura	22	22	7
(Poland) Ł Moren (Poland) W Szkudlarczyk	21	21
(Belgium) M Dierickx (Belgium) F Golinski	19	18
(China) Kang J (China) Liu C	21	19	17
(Japan) T Kamura (Japan) K Sonoda	16	21	21

Second Round
4	(Japan) H Endo (Japan) K Hayakawa	21	21
(Germany) P Käsbauer (Germany) J Zurwonne	11	12
12	(South Korea) Ko S-h (South Korea) Shin B-c	22	21
(Australia) R Middleton (Australia) R Smith	20	10
7	(Malaysia) Hoon T H (Malaysia) Tan W K	18	21	21
(Poland) Ł Moren (Poland) W Szkudlarczyk	21	14	19
14	(England) C Adcock (England) A Ellis	21	17	15
(Japan) T Kamura (Japan) K Sonoda	18	21	21

Third Round
4	(Japan) H Endo (Japan) K Hayakawa	21	17
12	(South Korea) Ko S-h (South Korea) Shin B-c	23	21
7	(Malaysia) Hoon T H (Malaysia) Tan W K	19	21	21
(Japan) T Kamura (Japan) K Sonoda	21	17	19

Quarterfinals
12	(South Korea) Ko S-h (South Korea) Shin B-c	21	21
7	(Malaysia) Hoon T H (Malaysia) Tan W K	18	13

=== Section 3 ===
First Round
(Indonesia) B Angriawan (Indonesia) R K Suwardi	21	21
(Canada) A Liu (Canada) D Ng	13	13
(United States) P Chew (United States) S Pongnairat	10	10
(England) C Langridge (England) P Mills	21	21
(Netherlands) J Arends (Netherlands) J Maas	16	13
(Germany) M Fuchs (Germany) J Schöttler	21	21
(New Zealand) K J Dennerly-Minturn (New Zealand) O Leydon-Davis	21	16	15
(Singapore) D B Chrisnanta (Singapore) C Triyachart	15	21	21

Second Round
(Indonesia) B Angriawan (Indonesia) R K Suwardi	15	25	9
9	(Indonesia) M F Gideon (Indonesia) M Kido	21	23	21
(England) C Langridge (England) P Mills	14	11
8	(China) Liu XL (China) Qiu ZH	21	21
(Germany) M Fuchs (Germany) J Schöttler	21	19	21
16	(Thailand) M Jongjit (Thailand) N Puangpuapech	19	21	15
(Singapore) D B Chrisnanta (Singapore) C Triyachart	8	16
3	(Denmark) M Boe (Denmark) C Mogensen	21	21

Third Round
9	(Indonesia) M F Gideon (Indonesia) M Kido	17	21	16
8	(China) Liu XL (China) Qiu ZH	21	13	21
(Germany) M Fuchs (Germany) J Schöttler	17	14
3	(Denmark) M Boe (Denmark) C Mogensen	21	21

Quarterfinals
8	(China) Liu XL (China) Qiu ZH	8	17
3	(Denmark) M Boe (Denmark) C Mogensen	21	21

=== Section 4 ===
First Round
(China) Li JH (China) Liu YC	21	21
(Scotland) M Campbell (Scotland) P MacHugh	16	12
(South Africa) A Malan (South Africa) W Viljoen	12	12
(Malaysia) Goh V S (Malaysia) Lim K W	21	21
(India) M Attri (India) B S Reddy	21	21	21
(Russia) N Khakimov (Russia) V Kuznetsov	19	21	19
(Brazil) H Arthuso (Brazil) A Y Tjong	17	12
(Australia) R Tam (Australia) G Warfe	21	21

Second Round
(China) Li JH (China) Liu YC	14	18
10	(Malaysia) Koo K K (Malaysia) Tan B H	21	21
(Malaysia) Goh V S (Malaysia) Lim K W	11	7^{r}
6	(Chinese Taipei) Lee S-m (Chinese Taipei) Tsai C-h	21	11
(India) M Attri (India) B S Reddy	21	21
15	(Japan) H Hashimoto (Japan) N Hirata	19	19
(Australia) R Tam (Australia) G Warfe	10	14
2	(South Korea) Lee Y-d (South Korea) Yoo Y-s	21	21

Third Round
10	(Malaysia) Koo K K (Malaysia) Tan B H	21	10	19
6	(Chinese Taipei) Lee S-m (Chinese Taipei) Tsai C-h	14	21	21
(India) M Attri (India) B S Reddy	12	17
2	(South Korea) Lee Y-d (South Korea) Yoo Y-s	21	21

Quarterfinals
6	(Chinese Taipei) Lee S-m (Chinese Taipei) Tsai C-h	16	13
2	(South Korea) Lee Y-d (South Korea) Yoo Y-s	21	21
