= 2013 BWF World Championships =

Tournament details
- Dates: 5 August – 11 August
- Edition: 20th
- Level: International
- Competitors: 345 from 49 nations
- Venue: Tianhe Sports Center
- Location: Guangzhou, China

The 2013 BWF World Championships was a badminton tournament which was held from 5 to 11 August 2013 at the Tianhe Sports Center in Guangzhou, China.

== Host city selection ==
Copenhagen, Guangzhou, and Macau submitted bids for this edition of championships. On 9 December 2011, Badminton World Federation decided to award the championships to Guangzhou during a meeting in Queenstown, New Zealand.

== Draw ==
The draw was held on 22 July at Guangzhou, China.

== Schedule ==
All five events started on the first day and concluded with the final on the last day.

All times are local (UTC+8).

Date	Time	Round
5 August 2013	10:00	Round of 64
6 August 2013	13:00	Round of 64
6 August 2013	13:00	Round of 32
7 August 2013	10:00	Round of 32
8 August 2013	13:00	Round of 16
9 August 2013	12:00	Quarterfinals
9 August 2013	18:00	Quarterfinals
10 August 2013	12:00	Semifinals
10 August 2013	18:00	Semifinals
11 August 2013	13:00	Finals

== Medalists ==
Event	Gold	Silver	Bronze
Men's singles	Lin Dan; China	Lee Chong Wei; Malaysia	Du Pengyu; China
Men's singles	Lin Dan; China	Lee Chong Wei; Malaysia	Nguyễn Tiến Minh; Vietnam
Women's singles	Ratchanok Intanon; Thailand	Li Xuerui; China	Bae Yeon-ju; South Korea
Women's singles	Ratchanok Intanon; Thailand	Li Xuerui; China	P. V. Sindhu; India
Men's doubles	Indonesia; Hendra Setiawan; Mohammad Ahsan	Denmark; Mathias Boe; Carsten Mogensen	China; Cai Yun; Fu Haifeng
Men's doubles	Indonesia; Hendra Setiawan; Mohammad Ahsan	Denmark; Mathias Boe; Carsten Mogensen	South Korea; Kim Ki-jung; Kim Sa-rang
Women's doubles	China; Wang Xiaoli; Yu Yang	South Korea; Eom Hye-won; Chang Ye-na	Denmark; Christinna Pedersen; Kamilla Rytter Juhl
Women's doubles	China; Wang Xiaoli; Yu Yang	South Korea; Eom Hye-won; Chang Ye-na	China; Tian Qing; Zhao Yunlei
Mixed doubles	Indonesia; Tontowi Ahmad; Lilyana Natsir	China; Xu Chen; Ma Jin	South Korea; Shin Baek-cheol; Eom Hye-won
Mixed doubles	Indonesia; Tontowi Ahmad; Lilyana Natsir	China; Xu Chen; Ma Jin	China; Zhang Nan; Zhao Yunlei

== Medal table ==
* Host nation (China)

Rank	Nation	Gold	Silver	Bronze	Total
1	China (CHN)*	2	2	4	8
2	Indonesia (INA)	2	0	0	2
3	Thailand (THA)	1	0	0	1
4	South Korea (KOR)	0	1	3	4
5	Denmark (DEN)	0	1	1	2
6	Malaysia (MAS)	0	1	0	1
7	India (IND)	0	0	1	1
7	Vietnam (VIE)	0	0	1	1
Totals (8 entries)		5	5	10	20

== Participating countries ==
345 players from 49 countries participated at this year's edition. The number in parentheses indicate the player contributed by each country.

- Australia (2)
- Austria (2)
- Belarus (1)
- Belgium (5)
- Bulgaria (4)
- Canada (3)
- China (26)
- Chinese Taipei (17)
- Croatia (2)
- Cuba (1)
- Czech Republic (5)
- Denmark (17)
- Egypt (2)
- England (12)
- Estonia (1)
- Finland (2)
- France (5)
- Germany (14)
- Hong Kong (13)
- India (14)
- Indonesia (28)
- Ireland (3)
- Israel (1)
- Japan (19)
- South Korea (18)
- Lithuania (1)
- Malaysia (25)
- Mauritius (1)
- Mexico (3)
- Netherlands (6)
- New Zealand (8)
- Norway (2)
- Philippines (4)
- Poland (6)
- Russia (14)
- Scotland (6)
- Singapore (6)
- Slovakia (1)
- Slovenia (2)
- Spain (3)
- Sri Lanka (1)
- Sweden (3)
- Switzerland (3)
- Thailand (14)
- United States (8)
- Uganda (1)
- Ukraine (7)
- Vietnam (1)
- Wales (2)
