= Carsten Mogensen =

Danish badminton player (born 1983)

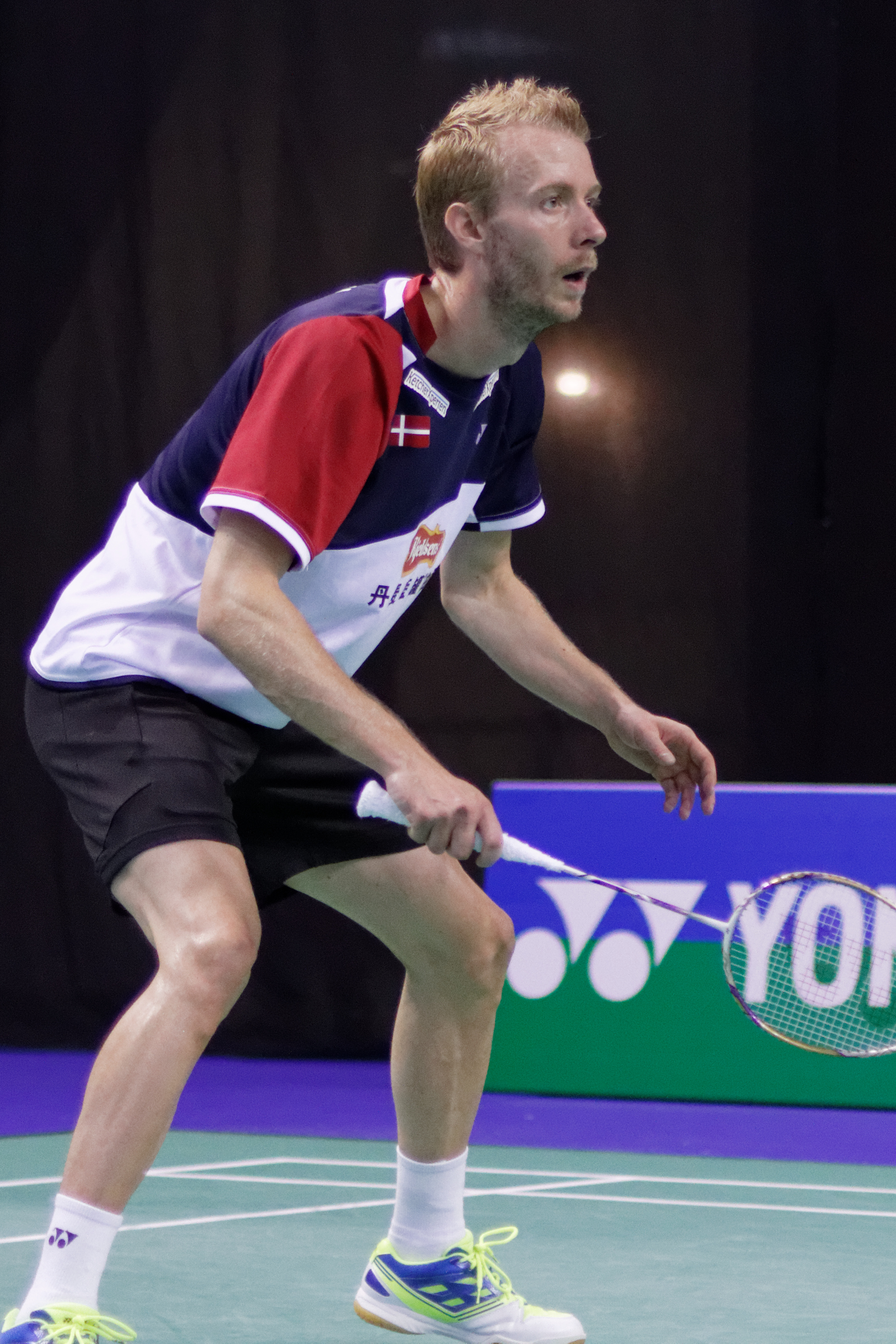
- Mogensen at the 2013 French Super Series

Personal information
- Born: 24 July 1983 (age 43) Roskilde, Denmark
- Height: 1.85 m (6 ft 1 in)
- Weight: 75 kg (165 lb)

Sport
- Country: Denmark
- Sport: Badminton
- Handedness: Right
- Coached by: Claus Poulsen
- Retired: 7 July 2020

Men's doubles
- Highest ranking: 1 (with Mathias Boe 11 November 2010)
- BWF profile
Medal record
Men's badminton
Representing Denmark
Olympic Games
Silver medal – second place	2012 London	Men's doubles
World Championships
Silver medal – second place	2013 Guangzhou	Men's doubles
Bronze medal – third place	2014 Copenhagen	Men's doubles
Sudirman Cup
Silver medal – second place	2011 Qingdao	Mixed team
Bronze medal – third place	2013 Kuala Lumpur	Mixed team
Thomas Cup
Silver medal – second place	2006 Sendai & Tokyo	Men's team
Bronze medal – third place	2012 Wuhan	Men's team
European Games
Gold medal – first place	2015 Baku	Men's doubles
European Championships
Gold medal – first place	2012 Karlskrona	Men's doubles
Gold medal – first place	2017 Kolding	Men's doubles
Silver medal – second place	2006 Den Bosch	Men's doubles
Silver medal – second place	2010 Manchester	Men's doubles
Bronze medal – third place	2008 Herning	Mixed doubles
Bronze medal – third place	2014 Kazan	Men's doubles
European Mixed Team Championships
Gold medal – first place	2015 Leuven	Mixed team
Gold medal – first place	2017 Lubin	Mixed team
Silver medal – second place	2013 Moscow	Mixed team
European Men's Team Championships
Gold medal – first place	2006 Thessalonica	Men's team
Gold medal – first place	2008 Almere	Men's team
Gold medal – first place	2010 Warsaw	Men's team
Gold medal – first place	2012 Amsterdam	Men's team
Gold medal – first place	2014 Basel	Men's team
Gold medal – first place	2016 Kazan	Men's team
Gold medal – first place	2020 Liévin	Men's team
European Junior Championships
Gold medal – first place	2001 Spała	Boys' doubles
Silver medal – second place	2001 Spała	Mixed doubles
Silver medal – second place	2001 Spała	Mixed team

Carsten Mogensen (born 24 July 1983) is a former badminton player from Denmark. He was the gold medalist at the 2015 European Games, two time European champions winning in 2012 and 2017, and the silver medalist at the 2012 Summer Olympics. Mogensen was a former world number 1 in the BWF World ranking together with Mathias Boe.

== Early life ==
Mogensen was born in Roskilde, a city on the island of Zealand and is currently living in nearby Greve.

== Career ==
He won the silver medal at the 2006 European Badminton Championships in men's doubles, with Mathias Boe. Two years later he won the bronze medal at the 2008 European Badminton Championships in mixed doubles with Helle Nielsen. In 2010, Mogensen and Boe won the titles at the Denmark Super Series, French Super Series and the Super Series Final held in Taipei. One year later Mogensen and Boe won the All England Super Series. After that they won the Li Ning China Open 2011 and the Li Ning BWF World Superseries Finals 2011. In 2012, Mogensen and Boe won the silver medal in men's doubles at the Olympics in London. He also took the silver medal at the 2013 BWF World Championships. In 2014 Li-Ning BWF World Championships he and Boe was defeated by the world number 1 Lee Yong Dae/Yoo Yeon Seong from Korea in two straight game at the semifinals, then he and Boe just taken the bronze medal in that world championships. In March 2015, Mogensen and Boe again won the All England Super Series.

While in Kazan with the national team at the 2016 European Men's Team Championship, Mogensen suffered an intracranial aneurysm and had to undergo brain surgery.

== Achievements ==
=== Olympic Games ===
Men's doubles
Year	Venue	Partner	Opponent	Score	Result
2012	Wembley Arena, London, Great Britain	(Denmark) Mathias Boe	(China) Cai Yun (China) Fu Haifeng	16–21, 15–21	Silver

=== BWF World Championships ===
Men's doubles
Year	Venue	Partner	Opponent	Score	Result
2013	Tianhe Sports Center, Guangzhou, China	(Denmark) Mathias Boe	(Indonesia) Mohammad Ahsan (Indonesia) Hendra Setiawan	13–21, 21–23	Silver
2014	Ballerup Super Arena, Copenhagen, Denmark	(Denmark) Mathias Boe	(South Korea) Lee Yong-dae (South Korea) Yoo Yeon-seong	12–21, 18–21	Bronze

=== European Games ===
Men's doubles
Year	Venue	Partner	Opponent	Score	Result
2015	Baku Sports Hall, Baku, Azerbaijan	(Denmark) Mathias Boe	(Russia) Vladimir Ivanov (Russia) Ivan Sozonov	21–8, 21–13	Gold

=== European Championships ===
Men's doubles
Year	Venue	Partner	Opponent	Score	Result
2006	Maaspoort Sports and Events; Den Bosch, Netherlands	(Denmark) Mathias Boe	(Denmark) Jens Eriksen (Denmark) Martin Lundgaard Hansen	15–21, 17–21	Silver
2010	Manchester Evening News Arena; Manchester, England	(Denmark) Mathias Boe	(Denmark) Lars Paaske (Denmark) Jonas Rasmussen	22–24, 20–22	Silver
2012	Telenor Arena; Karlskrona, Sweden	(Denmark) Mathias Boe	(Germany) Michael Fuchs (Germany) Oliver Roth	21–11, 21–11	Gold
2014	Gymnastics Center; Kazan, Russia	(Denmark) Mathias Boe	(Russia) Vladimir Ivanov (Russia) Ivan Sozonov	19–21, 21–18, 18–21	Bronze
2017	Sydbank Arena; Kolding, Denmark	(Denmark) Mathias Boe	(Denmark) Mads Conrad-Petersen (Denmark) Mads Pieler Kolding	21–16, 22–20	Gold

Mixed doubles
Year	Venue	Partner	Opponent	Score	Result
2008	Messecenter; Herning, Denmark	(Denmark) Helle Nielsen	(England) Anthony Clark (England) Donna Kellogg	18–21, 19–21	Bronze

=== European Junior Championships ===
Boys' doubles
Year	Venue	Partner	Opponent	Score	Result
2001	Spała Olympic Center, Spała, Poland	(Denmark) Rasmus Andersen	(Denmark) Peter Hasbak (Denmark) Rune Ulsing	15–9, 15–11	Gold

Mixed doubles
Year	Venue	Partner	Opponent	Score	Result
2001	Spała Olympic Center, Spała, Poland	(Denmark) Kamilla Rytter Juhl	(Denmark) Rasmus Andersen (Denmark) Mette Nielsen	15–8, 9–15, 15–17	Silver

=== BWF World Tour ===
The BWF World Tour, announced on 19 March 2017 and implemented in 2018, is a series of elite badminton tournaments, sanctioned by Badminton World Federation (BWF). The BWF World Tour are divided into six levels, namely World Tour Finals, Super 1000, Super 750, Super 500, Super 300 (part of the HSBC World Tour), and the BWF Tour Super 100.

Men's doubles
Year	Tournament	Level	Partner	Opponent	Score	Result
2018	Swiss Open	Super 300	(Denmark) Mathias Boe	(Thailand) Tinn Isriyanet (Thailand) Kittisak Namdash	21–15, 21–11	(gold) Winner
2018	All England Open	Super 1000	(Denmark) Mathias Boe	(Indonesia) Marcus Fernaldi Gideon (Indonesia) Kevin Sanjaya Sukamuljo	18–21, 17–21	(silver) Runner-up

=== BWF Superseries ===
The BWF Superseries, launched on 14 December 2006 and implemented in 2007, is a series of elite badminton tournaments, sanctioned by Badminton World Federation (BWF). BWF Superseries has two levels: Superseries and Superseries Premier. A season of Superseries features twelve tournaments around the world, which introduced since 2011, with successful players invited to the Superseries Finals held at the year end.

Men's doubles
Year	Tournament	Partner	Opponent	Score	Result
2008	China Open	(Denmark) Mathias Boe	(South Korea) Jung Jae-sung (South Korea) Lee Yong-dae	21–17, 17–21, 13–21	(silver) Runner-up
2009	Korea Open	(Denmark) Mathias Boe	(South Korea) Jung Jae-sung (South Korea) Lee Yong-dae	21–12, 24–22	(gold) Winner
2009	Swiss Open	(Denmark) Mathias Boe	(Malaysia) Koo Kien Keat (Malaysia) Tan Boon Heong	14–21, 18–21	(silver) Runner-up
2009	Denmark Open	(Denmark) Mathias Boe	(Malaysia) Koo Kien Keat (Malaysia) Tan Boon Heong	22–20, 14–21, 17–21	(silver) Runner-up
2009	World Superseries Masters Finals	(Denmark) Mathias Boe	(South Korea) Jung Jae-sung (South Korea) Lee Yong-dae	15–21, 15–21	(silver) Runner-up
2010	All England Open	(Denmark) Mathias Boe	(Denmark) Lars Paaske (Denmark) Jonas Rasmussen	23–21, 19–21, 24–26	(silver) Runner-up
2010	Denmark Open	(Denmark) Mathias Boe	(Indonesia) Markis Kido (Indonesia) Hendra Setiawan	21–13, 21–12	(gold) Winner
2010	French Open	(Denmark) Mathias Boe	(Germany) Ingo Kindervater (Germany) Johannes Schottler	21–15, 21–9	(gold) Winner
2010	World Superseries Finals	(Denmark) Mathias Boe	(South Korea) Jung Jae-sung (South Korea) Lee Yong-dae	21–17, 21–15	(gold) Winner
2011	Korea Open	(Denmark) Mathias Boe	(South Korea) Jung Jae-sung (South Korea) Lee Yong-dae	6–21, 13–21	(silver) Runner-up
2011	All England Open	(Denmark) Mathias Boe	(Malaysia) Koo Kien Keat (Malaysia) Tan Boon Heong	15–21, 21–18, 21–18	(gold) Winner
2011	China Open	(Denmark) Mathias Boe	(South Korea) Ko Sung-hyun (South Korea) Yoo Yeon-seong	21–17, 21–13	(gold) Winner
2011	World Superseries Finals	(Denmark) Mathias Boe	(China) Chai Biao (China) Guo Zhendong	25–23, 21–17	(gold) Winner
2012	Indonesia Open	(Denmark) Mathias Boe	(South Korea) Jung Jae-sung (South Korea) Lee Yong-dae	21–23, 21–19, 11–21	(silver) Runner-up
2012	China Open	(Denmark) Mathias Boe	(South Korea) Ko Sung-hyun (South Korea) Lee Yong-dae	21–15, 21–14	(gold) Winner
2012	World Superseries Finals	(Denmark) Mathias Boe	(Japan) Hiroyuki Endo (Japan) Kenichi Hayakawa	21–17, 21–19	(gold) Winner
2013	Korea Open	(Denmark) Mathias Boe	(South Korea) Ko Sung-hyun (South Korea) Lee Yong-dae	21–19, 13–21, 10–21	(silver) Runner-up
2014	Korea Open	(Denmark) Mathias Boe	(China) Fu Haifeng (China) Hong Wei	21–12, 21–17	(gold) Winner
2014	India Open	(Denmark) Mathias Boe	(China) Liu Xiaolong (China) Qiu Zihan	17–21, 21–15, 21–15	(gold) Winner
2014	French Open	(Denmark) Mathias Boe	(Japan) Hiroyuki Endo (Japan) Kenichi Hayakawa	18–21, 21–9, 21–7	(gold) Winner
2015	All England Open	(Denmark) Mathias Boe	(China) Fu Haifeng (China) Zhang Nan	21–17, 22–20	(gold) Winner
2015	Hong Kong Open	(Denmark) Mathias Boe	(South Korea) Lee Yong-dae (South Korea) Yoo Yeon-seong	7–21, 21–18, 18–21	(silver) Runner-up
2016	French Open	(Denmark) Mathias Boe	(Thailand) Bodin Isara (Thailand) Nipitphon Phuangphuapet	19–21, 21–18, 3–0 retired	(gold) Winner
2016	China Open	(Denmark) Mathias Boe	(Indonesia) Marcus Fernaldi Gideon (Indonesia) Kevin Sanjaya Sukamuljo	18–21, 20–22	(silver) Runner-up
2016	Hong Kong Open	(Denmark) Mathias Boe	(Japan) Takeshi Kamura (Japan) Keigo Sonoda	19–21, 19–21	(silver) Runner-up
2017	Singapore Open	(Denmark) Mathias Boe	(China) Li Junhui (China) Liu Yuchen	21–13, 21–14	(gold) Winner
2017	Indonesia Open	(Denmark) Mathias Boe	(China) Li Junhui (China) Liu Yuchen	19–21, 21–19, 18–21	(silver) Runner-up
2017	Korea Open	(Denmark) Mathias Boe	(Indonesia) Marcus Fernaldi Gideon (Indonesia) Kevin Sanjaya Sukamuljo	21–19, 19–21, 21–15	(gold) Winner
2017	French Open	(Denmark) Mathias Boe	(Chinese Taipei) Lee Jhe-huei (Chinese Taipei) Lee Yang	19–21, 21–23	(silver) Runner-up
2017	China Open	(Denmark) Mathias Boe	(Indonesia) Marcus Fernaldi Gideon (Indonesia) Kevin Sanjaya Sukamuljo	19–21, 11–21	(silver) Runner-up

BWF Super Series Finals tournament
BWF Super Series Premier tournament
BWF Super Series tournament

=== BWF Grand Prix ===
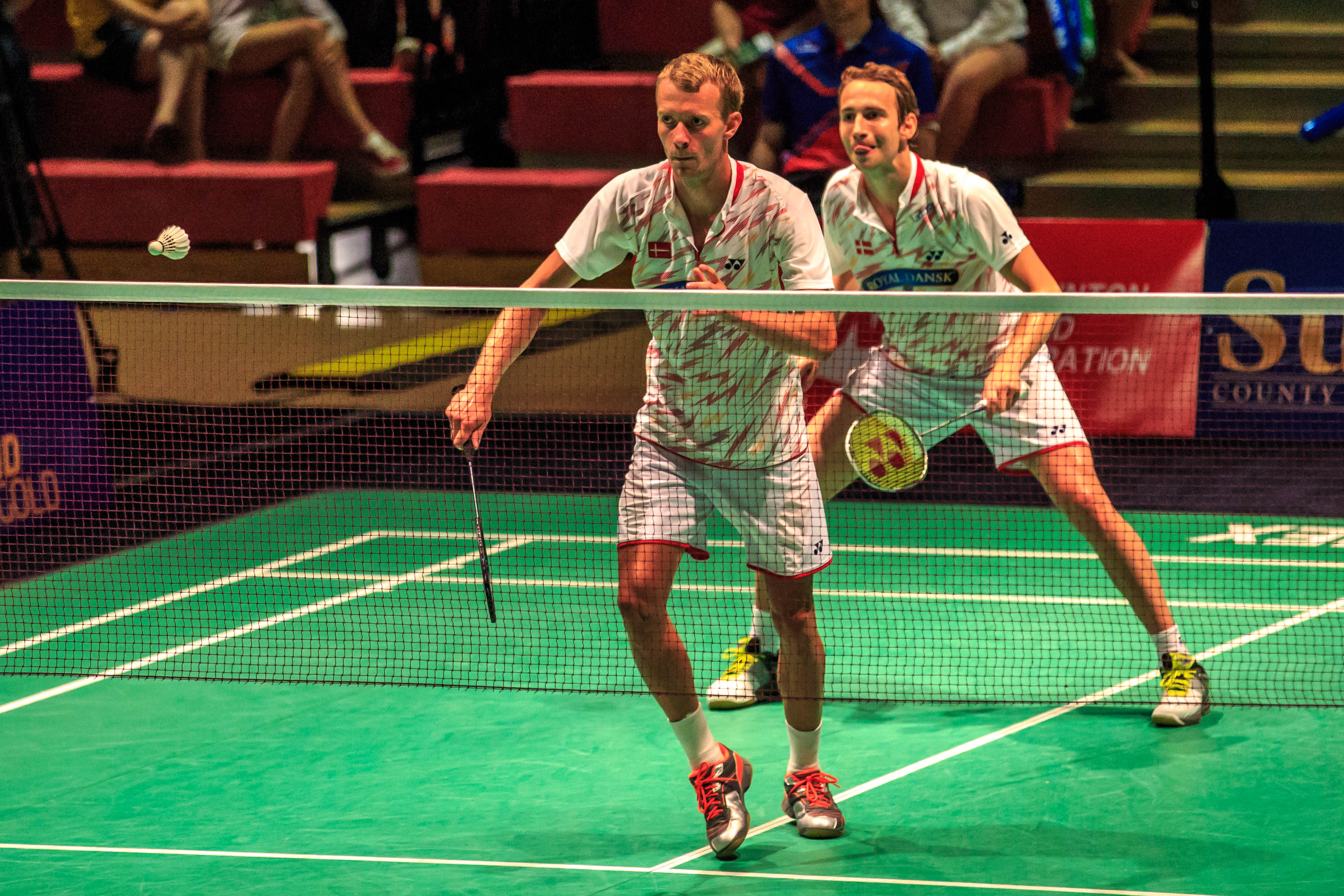
Mogensen with his partner Mathias Boe at the 2014 U.S. Open Grand Prix Gold

The BWF Grand Prix has two levels, Grand Prix and Grand Prix Gold. It is a series of badminton tournaments sanctioned by the Badminton World Federation (BWF) since 2007. The World Badminton Grand Prix sanctioned by International Badminton Federation (IBF) since 1983.

Men's doubles
Year	Tournament	Partner	Opponent	Score	Result
2004	German Open	(Denmark) Mathias Boe	(Denmark) Joachim Fischer Nielsen (Denmark) Jesper Larsen	15–6, 17–14	(gold) Winner
2004	U.S. Open	(Denmark) Mathias Boe	(United States) Howard Bach (United States) Tony Gunawan	5–15, 7–15	(silver) Runner-up
2005	Singapore Open	(Denmark) Mathias Boe	(Indonesia) Sigit Budiarto (Indonesia) Candra Wijaya	15–8, 8–15, 7–15	(silver) Runner-up
2005	Chinese Taipei Open	(Denmark) Mathias Boe	(United States) Tony Gunawan (United States) Halim Haryanto	13–15, 13–15	(silver) Runner-up
2006	Swiss Open	(Denmark) Mathias Boe	(Malaysia) Chan Chong Ming (Malaysia) Koo Kien Keat	14–17, 15–8, 14–17	(silver) Runner-up
2007	Bitburger Open	(Denmark) Mathias Boe	(England) Robert Blair (England) David Lindley	21–17, 21–15	(gold) Winner
2008	Chinese Taipei Open	(Denmark) Mathias Boe	(United States) Tony Gunawan (Indonesia) Candra Wijaya	22–20, 21–14	(gold) Winner
2008	Bitburger Open	(Denmark) Mathias Boe	(Germany) Kristof Hopp (Germany) Johannes Schottler	21–11, 21–15	(gold) Winner
2008	Bulgaria Open	(Denmark) Mathias Boe	(Indonesia) Fran Kurniawan (Indonesia) Rendra Wijaya	25–23, 21–16	(gold) Winner
2010	Bitburger Open	(Denmark) Mathias Boe	(Germany) Ingo Kindervater (Germany) Johannes Schottler	21–16, 21–16	(gold) Winner
2013	London Open	(Denmark) Mathias Boe	(Indonesia) Berry Angriawan (Indonesia) Ricky Karanda Suwardi	21–13, 21–16	(gold) Winner
2014	U.S. Open	(Denmark) Mathias Boe	(Thailand) Maneepong Jongjit (Thailand) Nipitphon Phuangphuapet	17–21, 21–15, 18–21	(silver) Runner-up
2015	Syed Modi International	(Denmark) Mathias Boe	(Russia) Vladimir Ivanov (Russia) Ivan Sozonov	21–9, 22–20	(gold) Winner
2016	U.S. Open	(Denmark) Mathias Boe	(Japan) Takuro Hoki (Japan) Yugo Kobayashi	21–11, 22–20	(gold) Winner
2017	Syed Modi International	(Denmark) Mathias Boe	(Chinese Taipei) Lu Ching-yao (Chinese Taipei) Yang Po-han	21–14, 21–15	(gold) Winner

Mixed doubles
Year	Tournament	Partner	Opponent	Score	Result
2004	German Open	(Denmark) Rikke Olsen	(China) Chen Qiqiu (China) Zhao Tingting	12–15, 15–8, 15–9	(gold) Winner

BWF Grand Prix Gold tournament
BWF Grand Prix tournament

=== BWF International Challenge/Series/European Circuit ===
Men's doubles
Year	Tournament	Partner	Opponent	Score	Result
2002	Slovenian International	(Denmark) Rasmus Andersen	(Spain) José Antonio Crespo (Spain) Sergio Llopis	15–4, 15–7	(gold) Winner
2003	French International	(Denmark) Joachim Fischer Nielsen	(Russia) Stanislav Pukhov (Russia) Nikolai Zuyev	15–13, 15–9	(gold) Winner
2003	Dutch International	(Denmark) Rasmus Andersen	(Denmark) Tommy Sørensen (Denmark) Jesper Thomsen	15–12, 15–11	(gold) Winner
2007	Spanish Open	(Denmark) Mathias Boe	(England) Richard Eidestedt (England) Robin Middleton	21–4, 21–10	(gold) Winner
2007	Le Volant d'Or de Toulouse	(Denmark) Mathias Boe	(Germany) Kristof Hopp (Germany) Ingo Kindervater	22–24, 21–12, 21–9	(gold) Winner
2007	Italian International	(Denmark) Mathias Boe	(Indonesia) Yonathan Suryatama Dasuki (Indonesia) Rian Sukmawan	21–18, 16–21, 21–11	(gold) Winner

Mixed doubles
Year	Tournament	Partner	Opponent	Score	Result
2002	Portugal International	(Denmark) Kamilla Rytter Juhl	(Sweden) Fredrik Bergström (Sweden) Jenny Karlsson	3–7, 7–2, 4–7, 4–7	(silver) Runner-up
2002	Le Volant d'Or de Toulouse	(Denmark) Kamilla Rytter Juhl	(Denmark) Jonas Glyager Jensen (Denmark) Majken Vange	5–11, 8–11	(silver) Runner-up
2003	Portugal International	(Denmark) Helle Nielsen	(Sweden) Fredrik Bergström (Sweden) Johanna Persson	13–10, 5–11, 7–11	(silver) Runner-up
2003	French International	(Denmark) Kamilla Rytter Juhl	(Sweden) Jörgen Olsson (Sweden) Frida Andreasson	11–5, 9–11, 7–11	(silver) Runner-up
2003	Croatian International	(Denmark) Kamilla Rytter Juhl	(Denmark) Rasmus Andersen (Denmark) Lena Frier Kristiansen	11–2, 11–3	(gold) Winner

BWF International Challenge tournament
BWF International Series tournament
