= Mathias Boe =

Danish badminton player (born 1980)

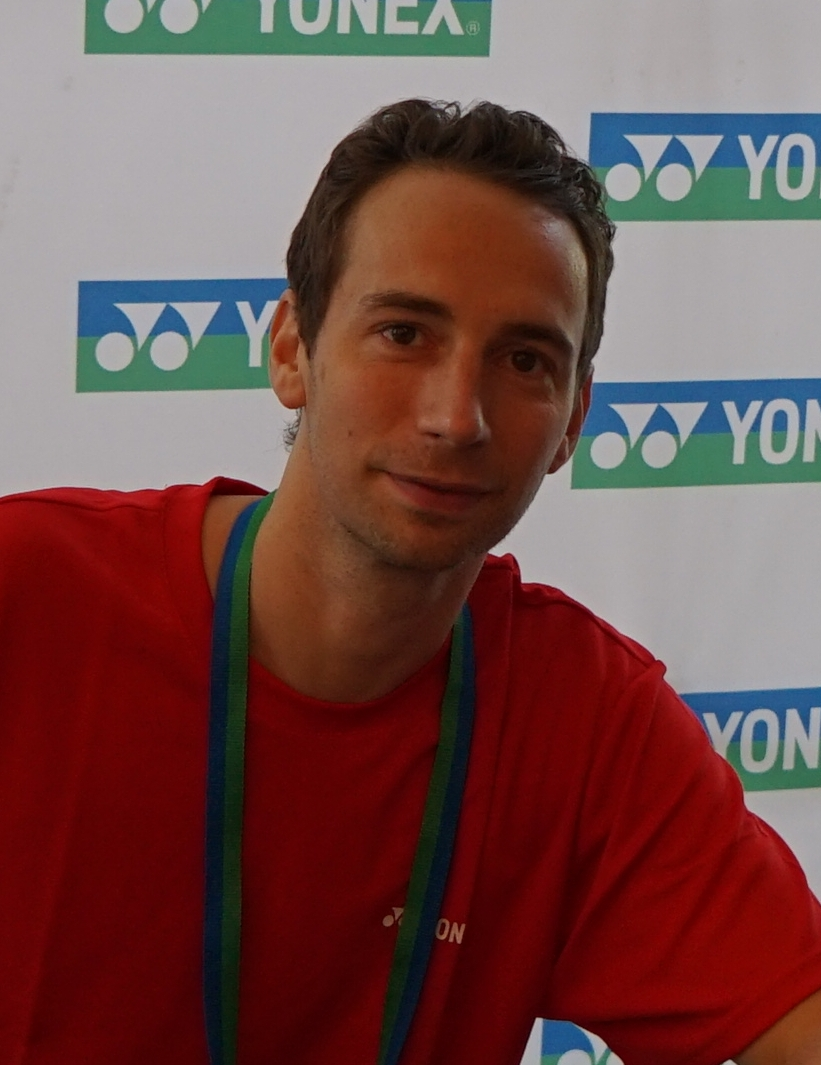
- Boe at the 2019 Chinese Taipei Open

Personal information
- Born: 11 July 1980 (age 46) Frederikssund, Denmark
- Height: 1.85 m (6 ft 1 in)
- Spouse: Taapsee Pannu (m. 2023)

Sport
- Country: Denmark
- Sport: Badminton
- Handedness: Left
- Retired: 23 April 2020

Men's doubles
- Highest ranking: 1 (with Carsten Mogensen 11 November 2010)
- BWF profile
Medal record
Men's badminton
Representing Denmark
Olympic Games
Silver medal – second place	2012 London	Men's doubles
World Championships
Silver medal – second place	2013 Guangzhou	Men's doubles
Bronze medal – third place	2014 Copenhagen	Men's doubles
Sudirman Cup
Silver medal – second place	2011 Qingdao	Mixed team
Bronze medal – third place	2013 Kuala Lumpur	Mixed team
Thomas Cup
Gold medal – first place	2016 Kunshan	Men's team
Bronze medal – third place	2012 Wuhan	Men's team
Bronze medal – third place	2018 Bangkok	Men's team
European Games
Gold medal – first place	2015 Baku	Men's doubles
European Championships
Gold medal – first place	2012 Karlskrona	Men's doubles
Gold medal – first place	2017 Kolding	Men's doubles
Silver medal – second place	2006 Den Bosch	Men's doubles
Silver medal – second place	2010 Manchester	Men's doubles
Bronze medal – third place	2014 Kazan	Men's doubles
European Mixed Team Championships
Gold medal – first place	2015 Leuven	Mixed team
Gold medal – first place	2017 Lubin	Mixed team
Silver medal – second place	2013 Moscow	Mixed team
European Men's Team Championships
Gold medal – first place	2006 Thessalonica	Men's team
Gold medal – first place	2008 Almere	Men's team
Gold medal – first place	2010 Warsaw	Men's team
Gold medal – first place	2012 Amsterdam	Men's team
Gold medal – first place	2014 Basel	Men's team
Gold medal – first place	2016 Kazan	Men's team
Gold medal – first place	2020 Liévin	Men's team
European Junior Championships
Gold medal – first place	1999 Glasgow	Boys' doubles
Gold medal – first place	1999 Glasgow	Mixed doubles
Bronze medal – third place	1999 Glasgow	Mixed team

Mathias Boe (born 11 July 1980) is a Danish former badminton player. He was the gold medalist at the 2015 European Games, two time European champions winning in 2012 and 2017, and the silver medalist at the 2012 Summer Olympics. Boe was a part of the 2016 Thomas Cup winning team.

== Career ==
He won the silver medal at the 2006 European Championships in men's doubles with Carsten Mogensen.

In 2010, Mogensen and Boe won the titles at the Denmark and French Opens and also the Superseries Final held in Taipei. One year later Mogensen and Boe won the All England Open.

With Mogensen, he won the silver medal in the men's doubles at the 2012 Olympics. He took the silver medal with Mogensen in the 2013 World Championships while losing to Muhammad Ahsan and Hendra Setiawan in the final.

Boe announced in February 2020, that the Thomas Cup or Olympic Games would be his last tournament, but in April 2020, he decided to retire as professional badminton player at the age of 39. He revealed that, mentally, he is lately simply too exhausted both in training and competition.

He was the men's doubles coach for the India national badminton team. Post the defeat of Satwiksairaj Rankireddy and Chirag Shetty in the Quarterfinals of the Paris Olympics 2024, he announced his retirement from all roles related to Badminton.

== Achievements ==
=== Olympic Games ===
Men's doubles
Year	Venue	Partner	Opponent	Score	Result
2012	Wembley Arena, London, Great Britain	(Denmark) Carsten Mogensen	(China) Cai Yun (China) Fu Haifeng	16–21, 15–21	Silver

=== World Championships ===
Men's doubles
Year	Venue	Partner	Opponent	Score	Result
2013	Tianhe Sports Center, Guangzhou, China	(Denmark) Carsten Mogensen	(Indonesia) Mohammad Ahsan (Indonesia) Hendra Setiawan	13–21, 21–23	Silver
2014	Ballerup Super Arena, Copenhagen, Denmark	(Denmark) Carsten Mogensen	(South Korea) Lee Yong-dae (South Korea) Yoo Yeon-seong	12–21, 18–21	Bronze

=== European Games ===
Men's doubles
Year	Venue	Partner	Opponent	Score	Result
2015	Baku Sports Hall, Baku, Azerbaijan	(Denmark) Carsten Mogensen	(Russia) Vladimir Ivanov (Russia) Ivan Sozonov	21–8, 21–13	Gold

=== European Championships ===
Men's doubles
Year	Venue	Partner	Opponent	Score	Result
2006	Maaspoort Sports and Events; Den Bosch, Netherlands	(Denmark) Carsten Mogensen	(Denmark) Jens Eriksen (Denmark) Martin Lundgaard Hansen	15–21, 17–21	Silver
2010	Manchester Evening News Arena; Manchester, England	(Denmark) Carsten Mogensen	(Denmark) Lars Paaske (Denmark) Jonas Rasmussen	22–24, 20–22	Silver
2012	Telenor Arena; Karlskrona, Sweden	(Denmark) Carsten Mogensen	(Germany) Michael Fuchs (Germany) Oliver Roth	21–11, 21–11	Gold
2014	Gymnastics Center; Kazan, Russia	(Denmark) Carsten Mogensen	(Russia) Vladimir Ivanov (Russia) Ivan Sozonov	19–21, 21–18, 18–21	Bronze
2017	Sydbank Arena; Kolding, Denmark	(Denmark) Carsten Mogensen	(Denmark) Mads Conrad-Petersen (Denmark) Mads Pieler Kolding	21–16, 22–20	Gold

=== European Junior Championships ===
Boys' doubles
Year	Venue	Partner	Opponent	Score	Result
1999	Kelvin Hall, Glasgow, Scotland	(Denmark) Kasper Kiim Jensen	(Poland) Przemysław Wacha (Poland) Piotr Żołądek	15–3, 15–8	Gold

Mixed doubles
Year	Venue	Partner	Opponent	Score	Result
1999	Kelvin Hall, Glasgow, Scotland	(Denmark) Karina Sørensen	(Germany) Sebastian Schmidt (Germany) Anne Hönscheid	15–5, 15–4	Gold

=== BWF World Tour (3 titles, 1 runner-up) ===
The BWF World Tour, which was announced on 19 March 2017 and implemented in 2018, is a series of elite badminton tournaments sanctioned by the Badminton World Federation (BWF). The BWF World Tour is divided into levels of World Tour Finals, Super 1000, Super 750, Super 500, Super 300, and the BWF Tour Super 100.

Men's doubles
Year	Tournament	Level	Partner	Opponent	Score	Result
2018	Swiss Open	Super 300	(Denmark) Carsten Mogensen	(Thailand) Tinn Isriyanet (Thailand) Kittisak Namdash	21–15, 21–11	(gold) Winner
2018	All England Open	Super 1000	(Denmark) Carsten Mogensen	(Indonesia) Marcus Fernaldi Gideon (Indonesia) Kevin Sanjaya Sukamuljo	18–21, 17–21	(silver) Runner-up
2019	Canada Open	Super 100	(Denmark) Mads Conrad-Petersen	(Japan) Hiroki Okamura (Japan) Masayuki Onodera	21–12, 21–18	(gold) Winner
2019	Russian Open	Super 100	(Denmark) Mads Conrad-Petersen	(Japan) Keiichiro Matsui (Japan) Yoshinori Takeuchi	21–18, 21–13	(gold) Winner

=== BWF Superseries ===
The BWF Superseries, launched on 14 December 2006 and implemented in 2007, is a series of elite badminton tournaments, sanctioned by Badminton World Federation (BWF). BWF Superseries has two levels: Superseries and Superseries Premier. A season of Superseries features twelve tournaments around the world, which introduced since 2011, with successful players invited to the Superseries Finals held at the year end.

Men's doubles
Year	Tournament	Partner	Opponent	Score	Result
2008	China Open	(Denmark) Carsten Mogensen	(South Korea) Jung Jae-sung (South Korea) Lee Yong-dae	21–17, 17–21, 13–21	(silver) Runner-up
2009	Korea Open	(Denmark) Carsten Mogensen	(South Korea) Jung Jae-sung (South Korea) Lee Yong-dae	21–12, 24–22	(gold) Winner
2009	Swiss Open	(Denmark) Carsten Mogensen	(Malaysia) Koo Kien Keat (Malaysia) Tan Boon Heong	14–21, 18–21	(silver) Runner-up
2009	Denmark Open	(Denmark) Carsten Mogensen	(Malaysia) Koo Kien Keat (Malaysia) Tan Boon Heong	22–20, 14–21, 17–21	(silver) Runner-up
2009	World Superseries Masters Finals	(Denmark) Carsten Mogensen	(South Korea) Jung Jae-sung (South Korea) Lee Yong-dae	15–21, 15–21	(silver) Runner-up
2010	All England Open	(Denmark) Carsten Mogensen	(Denmark) Lars Paaske (Denmark) Jonas Rasmussen	23–21, 19–21, 24–26	(silver) Runner-up
2010	Denmark Open	(Denmark) Carsten Mogensen	(Indonesia) Markis Kido (Indonesia) Hendra Setiawan	21–13, 21–12	(gold) Winner
2010	French Open	(Denmark) Carsten Mogensen	(Germany) Ingo Kindervater (Germany) Johannes Schottler	21–15, 21–9	(gold) Winner
2010	World Superseries Finals	(Denmark) Carsten Mogensen	(South Korea) Jung Jae-sung (South Korea) Lee Yong-dae	21–17, 21–15	(gold) Winner
2011	Korea Open	(Denmark) Carsten Mogensen	(South Korea) Jung Jae-sung (South Korea) Lee Yong-dae	6–21, 13–21	(silver) Runner-up
2011	All England Open	(Denmark) Carsten Mogensen	(Malaysia) Koo Kien Keat (Malaysia) Tan Boon Heong	15–21, 21–18, 21–18	(gold) Winner
2011	China Open	(Denmark) Carsten Mogensen	(South Korea) Ko Sung-hyun (South Korea) Yoo Yeon-seong	21–17, 21–13	(gold) Winner
2011	World Superseries Finals	(Denmark) Carsten Mogensen	(China) Chai Biao (China) Guo Zhendong	25–23, 21–17	(gold) Winner
2012	Indonesia Open	(Denmark) Carsten Mogensen	(South Korea) Jung Jae-sung (South Korea) Lee Yong-dae	21–23, 21–19, 11–21	(silver) Runner-up
2012	China Open	(Denmark) Carsten Mogensen	(South Korea) Ko Sung-hyun (South Korea) Lee Yong-dae	21–15, 21–14	(gold) Winner
2012	World Superseries Finals	(Denmark) Carsten Mogensen	(Japan) Hiroyuki Endo (Japan) Kenichi Hayakawa	21–17, 21–19	(gold) Winner
2013	Korea Open	(Denmark) Carsten Mogensen	(South Korea) Ko Sung-hyun (South Korea) Lee Yong-dae	21–19, 13–21, 10–21	(silver) Runner-up
2014	Korea Open	(Denmark) Carsten Mogensen	(China) Fu Haifeng (China) Hong Wei	21–12, 21–17	(gold) Winner
2014	India Open	(Denmark) Carsten Mogensen	(China) Liu Xiaolong (China) Qiu Zihan	17–21, 21–15, 21–15	(gold) Winner
2014	French Open	(Denmark) Carsten Mogensen	(Japan) Hiroyuki Endo (Japan) Kenichi Hayakawa	18–21, 21–9, 21–7	(gold) Winner
2015	All England Open	(Denmark) Carsten Mogensen	(China) Fu Haifeng (China) Zhang Nan	21–17, 22–20	(gold) Winner
2015	Hong Kong Open	(Denmark) Carsten Mogensen	(South Korea) Lee Yong-dae (South Korea) Yoo Yeon-seong	7–21, 21–18, 18–21	(silver) Runner-up
2016	French Open	(Denmark) Carsten Mogensen	(Thailand) Bodin Isara (Thailand) Nipitphon Phuangphuapet	19–21, 21–18, 3–0 retired	(gold) Winner
2016	China Open	(Denmark) Carsten Mogensen	(Indonesia) Marcus Fernaldi Gideon (Indonesia) Kevin Sanjaya Sukamuljo	18–21, 20–22	(silver) Runner-up
2016	Hong Kong Open	(Denmark) Carsten Mogensen	(Japan) Takeshi Kamura (Japan) Keigo Sonoda	19–21, 19–21	(silver) Runner-up
2017	Singapore Open	(Denmark) Carsten Mogensen	(China) Li Junhui (China) Liu Yuchen	21–13, 21–14	(gold) Winner
2017	Indonesia Open	(Denmark) Carsten Mogensen	(China) Li Junhui (China) Liu Yuchen	19–21, 21–19, 18–21	(silver) Runner-up
2017	Korea Open	(Denmark) Carsten Mogensen	(Indonesia) Marcus Fernaldi Gideon (Indonesia) Kevin Sanjaya Sukamuljo	21–19, 19–21, 21–15	(gold) Winner
2017	French Open	(Denmark) Carsten Mogensen	(Chinese Taipei) Lee Jhe-huei (Chinese Taipei) Lee Yang	19–21, 21–23	(silver) Runner-up
2017	China Open	(Denmark) Carsten Mogensen	(Indonesia) Marcus Fernaldi Gideon (Indonesia) Kevin Sanjaya Sukamuljo	19–21, 11–21	(silver) Runner-up

BWF Super Series Finals tournament
BWF Super Series Premier tournament
BWF Super Series tournament

=== BWF Grand Prix ===
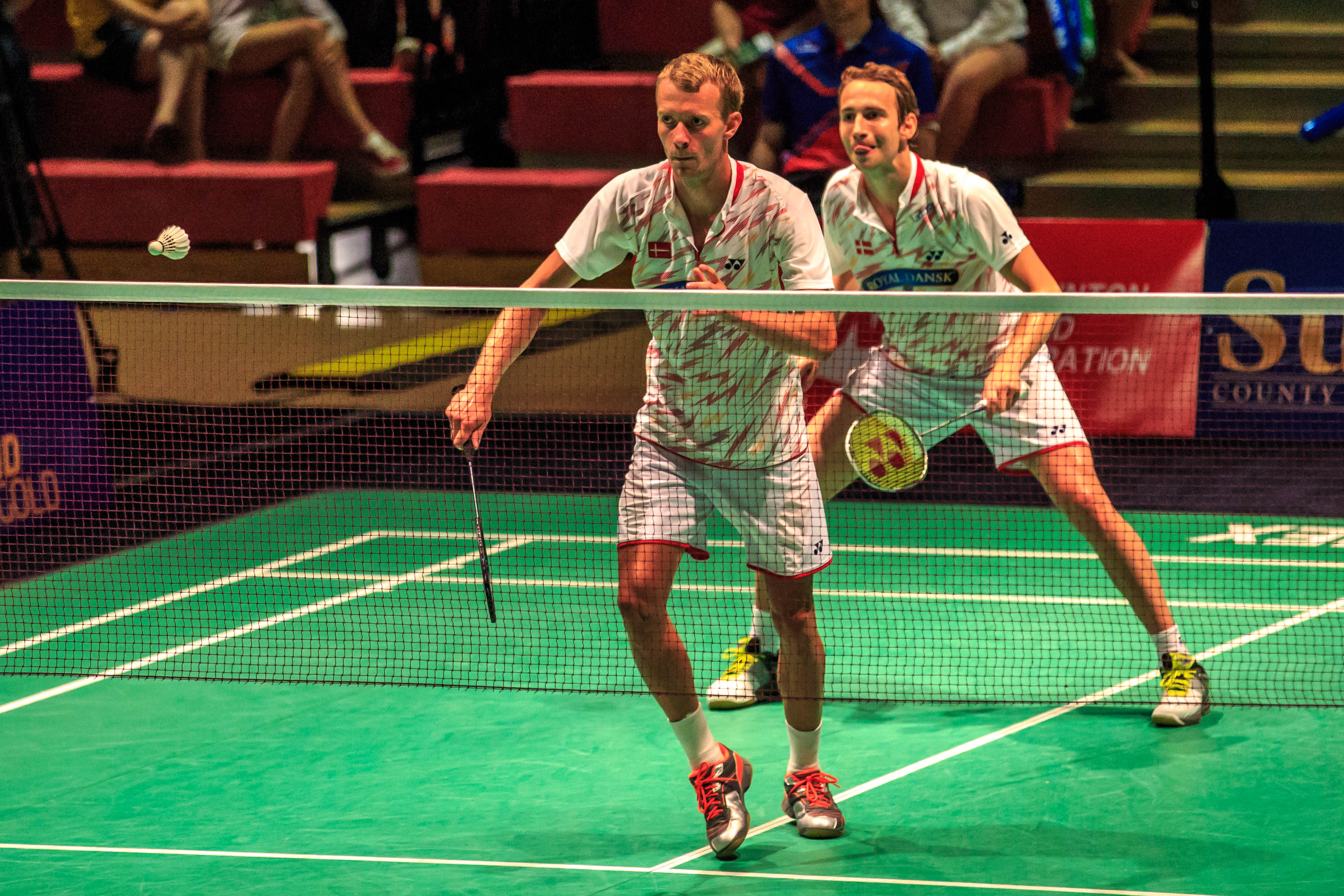
Boe with his partner Carsten Mogensen at the 2014 U.S. Open Grand Prix Gold

The BWF Grand Prix has two levels, Grand Prix and Grand Prix Gold. It is a series of badminton tournaments sanctioned by the Badminton World Federation (BWF) since 2007. The World Badminton Grand Prix sanctioned by International Badminton Federation (IBF) since 1983.

Men's doubles
Year	Tournament	Partner	Opponent	Score	Result
2004	German Open	(Denmark) Carsten Mogensen	(Denmark) Joachim Fischer Nielsen (Denmark) Jesper Larsen	15–6, 17–14	(gold) Winner
2004	U.S. Open	(Denmark) Carsten Mogensen	(United States) Howard Bach (United States) Tony Gunawan	5–15, 7–15	(silver) Runner-up
2005	Singapore Open	(Denmark) Carsten Mogensen	(Indonesia) Sigit Budiarto (Indonesia) Candra Wijaya	15–8, 8–15, 7–15	(silver) Runner-up
2005	Chinese Taipei Open	(Denmark) Carsten Mogensen	(United States) Tony Gunawan (United States) Halim Haryanto	13–15, 13–15	(silver) Runner-up
2006	Swiss Open	(Denmark) Carsten Mogensen	(Malaysia) Chan Chong Ming (Malaysia) Koo Kien Keat	14–17, 15–8, 14–17	(silver) Runner-up
2006	Bulgaria Open	(Denmark) Joachim Fischer Nielsen	(Denmark) Anders Kristiansen (Denmark) Simon Mollyhus	18–21, 21–18, 25–23	(gold) Winner
2006	Denmark Open	(Denmark) Joachim Fischer Nielsen	(Denmark) Lars Paaske (Denmark) Jonas Rasmussen	21–18, 10–21, 17–21	(silver) Runner-up
2007	Bitburger Open	(Denmark) Carsten Mogensen	(England) Robert Blair (England) David Lindley	21–17, 21–15	(gold) Winner
2008	Chinese Taipei Open	(Denmark) Carsten Mogensen	(United States) Tony Gunawan (Indonesia) Candra Wijaya	22–20, 21–14	(gold) Winner
2008	Bitburger Open	(Denmark) Carsten Mogensen	(Germany) Kristof Hopp (Germany) Johannes Schottler	21–11, 21–15	(gold) Winner
2008	Bulgaria Open	(Denmark) Carsten Mogensen	(Indonesia) Fran Kurniawan (Indonesia) Rendra Wijaya	25–23, 21–16	(gold) Winner
2010	Bitburger Open	(Denmark) Carsten Mogensen	(Germany) Ingo Kindervater (Germany) Johannes Schottler	21–16, 21–16	(gold) Winner
2013	London Open	(Denmark) Carsten Mogensen	(Indonesia) Berry Angriawan (Indonesia) Ricky Karanda Suwardi	21–13, 21–16	(gold) Winner
2014	U.S. Open	(Denmark) Carsten Mogensen	(Thailand) Maneepong Jongjit (Thailand) Nipitphon Phuangphuapet	17–21, 21–15, 18–21	(silver) Runner-up
2015	Syed Modi International	(Denmark) Carsten Mogensen	(Russia) Vladimir Ivanov (Russia) Ivan Sozonov	21–9, 22–20	(gold) Winner
2016	U.S. Open	(Denmark) Carsten Mogensen	(Japan) Takuro Hoki (Japan) Yugo Kobayashi	21–11, 22–20	(gold) Winner
2017	Syed Modi International	(Denmark) Carsten Mogensen	(Chinese Taipei) Lu Ching-yao (Chinese Taipei) Yang Po-han	21–14, 21–15	(gold) Winner

Mixed doubles
Year	Tournament	Partner	Opponent	Score	Result
2001	U.S. Open	(Denmark) Majken Vange	(Canada) William Milroy (Canada) Denyse Julien	7–2, 7–3, 7–1	(gold) Winner

BWF Grand Prix Gold tournament
BWF Grand Prix tournament

=== BWF International Challenge/Series/European Circuit ===
Men's doubles
Year	Tournament	Partner	Opponent	Score	Result
2000	Romanian International	(Denmark) Michael Jensen	(Austria) Harald Koch (Austria) Jürgen Koch	15–4, 15–3	(gold) Winner
2000	Slovenian International	(Denmark) Michael Jensen	(Denmark) Kristian Langbak (Denmark) Peter Steffensen	Walkover	(gold) Winner
2001	Dutch International	(Denmark) Thomas Hovgaard	(Denmark) Martin Delfs (Denmark) Jonas Glyager Jensen	15–4, 15–9	(gold) Winner
2001	Austrian International	(Denmark) Thomas Hovgaard	(Poland) Michał Łogosz (Poland) Robert Mateusiak	13–15, 3–15	(silver) Runner-up
2003	Portugal International	(Denmark) Michael Lamp	(Denmark) Jim Laugesen (Denmark) Michael Søgaard	7–15, 3–15	(silver) Runner-up
2003	Spanish International	(Denmark) Michael Lamp	(Russia) Stanislav Pukhov (Russia) Nikolai Zuyev	15–4, 15–9	(gold) Winner
2007	Spanish Open	(Denmark) Carsten Mogensen	(England) Richard Eidestedt (England) Robin Middleton	21–4, 21–10	(gold) Winner
2007	Le Volant d'Or de Toulouse	(Denmark) Carsten Mogensen	(Germany) Kristof Hopp (Germany) Ingo Kindervater	22–24, 21–12, 21–9	(gold) Winner
2007	Italian International	(Denmark) Carsten Mogensen	(Indonesia) Yonathan Suryatama Dasuki (Indonesia) Rian Sukmawan	21–18, 16–21, 21–11	(gold) Winner
2019	Spanish International	(Denmark) Mads Conrad-Petersen	(Denmark) Joel Eipe (Denmark) Rasmus Kjær	21–11, 21–10	(gold) Winner

Mixed doubles
Year	Tournament	Partner	Opponent	Score	Result
2000	Portugal International	(Denmark) Karina Sørensen	(Ukraine) Valeriy Strelcov (Ukraine) Natalia Golovkina	15–4, 15–12	(gold) Winner
2000	Dutch International	(Denmark) Karina Sørensen	(Netherlands) Tijs Creemers (Netherlands) Betty Krab	15–8, 15–9	(gold) Winner
2000	Romanian International	(Denmark) Britta Andersen	(Denmark) Michael Jensen (Denmark) Lene Mørk	15–7, 15–8	(gold) Winner
2000	Czech International	(Denmark) Britta Andersen	(Denmark) Jonas Glyager Jensen (Denmark) Lene Mørk	16–17, 15–7, 15–7	(gold) Winner
2000	Slovenian International	(Denmark) Britta Andersen	(Scotland) Russell Hogg (Scotland) Kirsteen McEwan	15–9, 15–3	(gold) Winner
2001	Austrian International	(Denmark) Britta Andersen	(Denmark) Peter Steffensen (Denmark) Lene Mørk	15–2, 15–5	(gold) Winner
2002	BMW International	(Denmark) Rikke Olsen	(England) Nathan Robertson (England) Gail Emms	9–11, 11–3, 9–11	(silver) Runner-up

BWF International Challenge tournament
BWF International Series tournament

== Personal life ==
Boe was in an eleven-year relationship with Indian actress Taapsee Pannu and was engaged to her for nine years before getting married. Following a court marriage in December 2023, Boe married Pannu on 23 March 2024 in a traditional wedding ceremony in Udaipur.
