= He Hanbin =

Chinese badminton player (born 1986)

He Hanbin 何汉斌
Personal information
- Born: 10 January 1986 (age 40) Donghu, Nanchang, Jiangxi, China
- Height: 1.78 m (5 ft 10 in)
- Weight: 76 kg (168 lb)

Sport
- Country: China
- Sport: Badminton
- Handedness: Right
- Event: Men's & mixed doubles

Men's & mixed doubles
- BWF profile
Medal record
Men's badminton
Representing China
Olympic Games
Bronze medal – third place	2008 Beijing	Mixed doubles
World Championships
Silver medal – second place	2010 Paris	Mixed doubles
Sudirman Cup
Gold medal – first place	2009 Guangzhou	Mixed team
Thomas Cup
Gold medal – first place	2008 Jakarta	Men's team
Asian Games
Gold medal – first place	2010 Guangzhou	Men's team
Bronze medal – third place	2010 Guangzhou	Mixed doubles
Asian Championships
Gold medal – first place	2007 Johor Bahru	Mixed doubles
Bronze medal – third place	2008 Johor Bahru	Mixed doubles
World Junior Championships
Gold medal – first place	2004 Richmond	Mixed doubles
Gold medal – first place	2004 Richmond	Mixed team
Bronze medal – third place	2004 Richmond	Boys' doubles
Asian Junior Championships
Gold medal – first place	2004 Hwacheon	Boys' team
Bronze medal – third place	2004 Hwacheon	Boys' doubles
Bronze medal – third place	2004 Hwacheon	Mixed doubles

He Hanbin (simplified Chinese: 何汉斌; traditional Chinese: 何漢斌; pinyin: Hé Hànbīn; born 10 January 1986) is a retired badminton player from China.

== Career ==
A doubles specialist, He won men's doubles at the Austrian International tourney with Guo Zhendong in 2007. Most of his accomplishments, however, have come in mixed doubles with Yu Yang. They have captured the Asian Championships (2007) together, as well as the Thailand (2007), Denmark (2007), Swiss (2008), Malaysia (2008), and French (2008) Opens. At the 2008 Beijing Olympics He and Yu lost a very close semifinal match to Indonesia's Nova Widianto and Lilyana Natsir, but won an equally close match over another Indonesian pair, Flandy Limpele and Vita Marissa to earn a bronze medal.

== Achievements ==
=== Olympic Games ===
Mixed doubles
Year	Venue	Partner	Opponent	Score	Result
2008	Beijing University of Technology Gymnasium, Beijing, China	(China) Yu Yang	(Indonesia) Flandy Limpele (Indonesia) Vita Marissa	19–21, 21–17, 23–21	Bronze

=== BWF World Championships ===
Mixed doubles
Year	Venue	Partner	Opponent	Score	Result
2010	Stade Pierre de Coubertin, Paris, France	(China) Yu Yang	(China) Zheng Bo (China) Ma Jin	14–21, 10–21	Silver

=== Asian Games ===
Mixed doubles
Year	Venue	Partner	Opponent	Score	Result
2010	Tianhe Gymnasium, Guangzhou, China	(China) Ma Jin	(South Korea) Shin Baek-cheol (South Korea) Lee Hyo-jung	22–20, 18–21, 20–22	Bronze

=== Asian Championships ===
Mixed doubles
Year	Venue	Partner	Opponent	Score	Result
2007	Bandaraya Stadium, Johor Bahru, Malaysia	(China) Yu Yang	(China) Xu Chen (China) Zhao Tingting	22–20, 21–15	Gold
2008	Bandaraya Stadium, Johor Bahru, Malaysia	(China) Yu Yang	(Indonesia) Nova Widianto (Indonesia) Liliyana Natsir	14–21, 17–21	Bronze

=== World Junior Championships ===
Boys' doubles
Year	Venue	Partner	Opponent	Score	Result
2004	Minoru Arena, Richmond, Canada	(China) Shen Ye	(South Korea) Jung Jung-young (South Korea) Lee Yong-dae	14–17, 15–11, 5–15	Bronze

Mixed doubles
Year	Venue	Partner	Opponent	Score	Result
2004	Minoru Arena, Richmond, Canada	(China) Yu Yang	(Indonesia) Muhammad Rijal (Indonesia) Greysia Polii	15–12, 15–12	Gold

=== Asian Junior Championships ===
Boys' doubles
Year	Venue	Partner	Opponent	Score	Result
2004	Hwacheon Indoor Stadium, Hwacheon, South Korea	(China) Shen Ye	(South Korea) Jung Jung-young (South Korea) Lee Yong-dae	15–5, 8–15, 5–15	Bronze

Mixed doubles
Year	Venue	Partner	Opponent	Score	Result
2004	Hwacheon Indoor Stadium, Hwacheon, South Korea	(China) Pan Pan	(South Korea) Yoo Yeon-seong (South Korea) Ha Jung-eun	13–15, 15–6, 13–15	Bronze

=== BWF Superseries ===
The BWF Superseries, launched on 14 December 2006 and implemented in 2007, is a series of elite badminton tournaments, sanctioned by Badminton World Federation (BWF). BWF Superseries has two level such as Superseries and Superseries Premier. A season of Superseries features twelve tournaments around the world, which introduced since 2011, with successful players invited to the Superseries Finals held at the year end.

Mixed doubles
Year	Tournament	Partner	Opponent	Score	Result
2007	Denmark Open	(China) Yu Yang	(England) Nathan Robertson (England) Gail Emms	21–17, 19–21, 21–17	(gold) Winner
2008	Malaysia Open	(China) Yu Yang	(South Korea) Lee Yong-dae (South Korea) Lee Hyo-jung	21–14, 21–15	(gold) Winner
2008	Swiss Open	(China) Yu Yang	(England) Anthony Clark (England) Donna Kellogg	21–15, 21–9	(gold) Winner
2008	French Open	(China) Yu Yang	(England) Anthony Clark (England) Donna Kellogg	21–13, 21–19	(gold) Winner
2009	All England Open	(China) Yu Yang	(South Korea) Ko Sung-hyun (South Korea) Ha Jung-eun	13–21, 21–15, 21–9	(gold) Winner
2010	Korea Open	(China) Yu Yang	(China) Tao Jiaming (China) Zhang Yawen	21–15, 21–16	(gold) Winner
2011	Malaysia Open	(China) Ma Jin	(China) Tao Jiaming (China) Tian Qing	21–13, 13–21, 21–16	(gold) Winner

BWF Super Series Finals tournament
BWF Super Series Premier tournament
BWF Super Series tournament

=== BWF Grand Prix ===
The BWF Grand Prix has two levels, the BWF Grand Prix and Grand Prix Gold. It is a series of badminton tournaments sanctioned by the Badminton World Federation (BWF) since 2007.

Mixed doubles
Year	Tournament	Partner	Opponent	Score	Result
2007	Thailand Open	(China) Yu Yang	(South Korea) Han Sang-hoon (South Korea) Hwang Yu-mi	21–12, 21–14	(gold) Winner
2007	Russian Open	(China) Yu Yang	(Poland) Robert Mateusiak (Poland) Nadieżda Kostiuczyk	23–25, 21–13, 13–21	(silver) Runner-up
2008	German Open	(China) Yu Yang	(South Korea) Lee Yong-dae (South Korea) Lee Hyo-jung	21–9, 25–27, 18–21	(silver) Runner-up
2008	India Open	(China) Yu Yang	(Germany) Kristof Hopp (Germany) Birgit Overzier	21–18, 21–9	(gold) Winner
2008	Thailand Open	(China) Yu Yang	(China) Xie Zhongbo (China) Zhang Yawen	25–23, 10–21, 21–23	(silver) Runner-up
2009	Macau Open	(China) Yu Yang	(Indonesia) Hendra Aprida Gunawan (Indonesia) Vita Marissa	21–14, 21–9	(gold) Winner
2010	Vietnam Open	(China) Ma Jin	(Hong Kong) Yohan Hadikusumo Wiratama (Hong Kong) Tse Ying Suet	21–18, 21–11	(gold) Winner
2011	Indonesia Grand Prix Gold	(China) Bao Yixin	(China) Xu Chen (China) Ma Jin	21–19, 1–4 retired	(gold) Winner

BWF Grand Prix Gold tournament
BWF Grand Prix tournament

=== BWF International Challenge/Series ===
Men's doubles
Year	Tournament	Partner	Opponent	Score	Result
2007	Austrian International	(China) Guo Zhendong	(Russia) Vitalij Durkin (Russia) Alexandr Nikolaenko	21–15, 19–21, 21–17	(gold) Winner

BWF International Challenge tournament
BWF International Series tournament
