= Jeon Jun-bum =

South Korean badminton player

Personal information
- Born: 29 September 1986 (age 40) Jeonju, South Korea

Sport
- Country: South Korea
- Sport: Badminton
- Event: Men's & mixed doubles

Men's & mixed doubles
- BWF profile
Medal record
Men's badminton
Representing South Korea
World Junior Championships
Silver medal – second place	2004 Richmond	Mixed team
Bronze medal – third place	2004 Richmond	Boys' doubles
Asian Junior Championships
Silver medal – second place	2004 Hwacheon	Boys' doubles
Silver medal – second place	2004 Hwacheon	Boys' team

Jeon Jun-bum (Korean: 전준범; born 29 September 1986) is a South Korean badminton player. Born in Jeonju, Jeon has shown his talent in doubles category when he won the Dutch and German Junior boys' doubles title in 2003. Jeon who was educated at the Jeonju Life Science high school, was part of the Korean national junior team that won the silver medal at the 2004 Asian Junior Championships in the boys' team event, also clinched the silver medal in the boys' doubles event partnered with Yoo Yeon-seong. At the same year, he also competed at the World Junior Championships, clinched the silver medal in the mixed team event and a bronze medal in the boys' doubles event. Jeon affiliated with the Wonkwang University, he won his first senior international title at the 2006 Mongolia Satellite tournament, and claimed the World Grand Prix title at the Vietnam Open.

== Achievements ==
=== World Junior Championships ===
Boys' doubles
Year	Venue	Partner	Opponent	Score	Result
2004	Minoru Arena, Richmond, Canada	(South Korea) Yoo Yeon-seong	(Malaysia) Hoon Thien How (Malaysia) Tan Boon Heong	10–15, 14–17	Bronze

=== Asian Junior Championships ===
Boys' doubles
Year	Venue	Partner	Opponent	Score	Result
2004	Hwacheon Indoor Stadium; Hwacheon, South Korea	(South Korea) Yoo Yeon-seong	(South Korea) Jung Jung-young (South Korea) Lee Yong-dae	11–15, 3–15	Silver

=== IBF World Grand Prix ===
The World Badminton Grand Prix sanctioned by International Badminton Federation (IBF) since 1983.

Men's doubles
Year	Tournament	Partner	Opponent	Score	Result
2006	Vietnam Open	(South Korea) Yoo Yeon-seong	(Malaysia) Chew Choon Eng (Malaysia) Hong Chieng Hun	21–19, 21–19	(gold) Winner

=== IBF International ===
Men's doubles
Year	Tournament	Partner	Opponent	Score	Result
2003	Hungarian International	(South Korea) Yoo Yeon-seong	(South Korea) Hwang Ji-man (South Korea) Lee Jae-jin	12–15, 12–15	(silver) Runner-up
2005	Thailand Satellite	(South Korea) Kim Dae-sung	(South Korea) Han Sang-hoon (South Korea) Hwang Ji-man	6–15, 12–15	(silver) Runner-up
2006	Mongolia Satellite	(South Korea) Yoo Yeon-seong	(South Korea) Kim Ki-jung (South Korea) Lee Jung-hwan	21–14, 21–14	(gold) Winner

Mixed doubles
Year	Tournament	Partner	Opponent	Score	Result
2005	Vietnam Satellite	(South Korea) Ha Jung-eun	(South Korea) Hwang Ji-man (South Korea) Oh Seul-ki	15–7, 6–15, 12–15	(silver) Runner-up
