= 2004 IBF World Junior Championships – boys' doubles =

2004 IBF World Junior Championships boys' doubles
Tournament details
- Dates: 25 October 2004 – 30 October 2004
- Edition: 7th
- Level: International
- Venue: Minoru Arena
- Location: Richmond, Canada

The boys' doubles event for the 2004 IBF World Junior Championships was held between 25 October and 30 October. Hoon Thien How and Tan Boon Heong of Malaysia won the title.

== Seeded ==
1. (South Korea) Yoo Yeon-seong / Jeon Jun-bum (semi-final)
2. (South Korea) Lee Yong-dae / Jung Jung-young (final)
3. (China) Shen Ye / He Hanbin (semi-final)
4. (China) Li Rui / Cao Liu (quarter-final)
5. (Chinese Taipei) Fang Chieh-min / Lee Sheng-mu (quarter-final)
6. (Malaysia) Hoon Thien How / Tan Boon Heong (champion)
7. (Japan) Kazuaki Oshima / Jun Tamura (second round)
8. (Indonesia) Muhammad Rijal / I Made Agung (quarter-final)

== Draw ==
=== Finals ===
Semifinals
1	(South Korea) Yoo Yeon-seong (South Korea) Jeon Jun-bum	10	14
5/8	(Malaysia) Hoon Thien How (Malaysia) Tan Boon Heong	15	17
3/4	(China) Shen Ye (China) He Hanbin	14	15	5
2	(South Korea) Lee Yong-dae (South Korea) Jung Jung-young	17	11	15

Final
5/8	(Malaysia) Hoon Thien How (Malaysia) Tan Boon Heong	15	3	15
2	(South Korea) Lee Yong-dae (South Korea) Jung Jung-young	6	15	12

=== Top half ===
==== Section 1 ====
First round
(United States) A Todt (United States) D Lim	6	6
(Indonesia) T Sugiarto (Indonesia) A Rivai	15	15
(Canada) B Dejong (Canada) N Keifer	11	6
(Croatia) N Rihtar (Portugal) A Paixão	15	15

Second round
1	(South Korea) Yoo Y-s (South Korea) Jeon J-b	15	15
(Japan) M Takeuchi (Japan) M Nasuka	0	7
(Slovenia) I Utroša (Slovenia) R Cinc	1	9
(Indonesia) T Sugiarto (Indonesia) A Rivai	15	15
5/8	(Chinese Taipei) Fang C-m (Chinese Taipei) Lee S-m	15	15
(Sweden) T Foo (Sweden) R Eidestedt	11	6
(England) R Adcock (England) E Foster	15	15
(Croatia) N Rihtar (Portugal) A Paixão	12	11

Third round
1	(South Korea) Yoo Y-s (South Korea) Jeon J-b	15	15
(Indonesia) T Sugiarto (Indonesia) A Rivai	6	3
5/8	(Chinese Taipei) Fang C-m (Chinese Taipei) Lee S-m	15	15
(England) R Adcock (England) E Foster	9	9

Quarter finals
1	(South Korea) Yoo Y-s (South Korea) Jeon J-b	15	13	15
5/8	(Chinese Taipei) Fang C-m (Chinese Taipei) Lee S-m	5	15	7

==== Section 2 ====
First round
(India) J Sanyal (India) S Chopda	13	8
(Germany) J Schulz (Germany) T Zander	15	15
(Jamaica) N Robinson (Jamaica) S Forrester	WO
(Russia) V Ivanov (Russia) M Danchenko

Second round
3/4	(China) Li R (China) Cao L	15	15
(Singapore) Koh YS (Singapore) A Latib	4	3
(Denmark) H Vittinghus (Denmark) U Nielsen	7	5
(Germany) J Schulz (Germany) T Zander	15	15
5/8	(Malaysia) Hoon TH (Malaysia) Tan BH	15	15
(Czech Republic) T Kopřiva (Czech Republic) P Florián	6	2
(Nigeria) K Omoruyi (Nigeria) A Otagada	6	10
(Russia) V Ivanov (Russia) M Danchenko	15	15

Third round
3/4	(China) Li R (China) Cao L	15	15
(Germany) J Schulz (Germany) T Zander	10	8
5/8	(Malaysia) Hoon TH (Malaysia) Tan BH	15	15
(Russia) V Ivanov (Russia) M Danchenko	5	1

Quarter finals
3/4	(China) Li R (China) Cao L	5	10
5/8	(Malaysia) Hoon TH (Malaysia) Tan BH	15	15

=== Bottom half ===
==== Section 3 ====
First round
(Nigeria) J Bulus (Nigeria) O Elewa	WO
(Germany) D Domke (Germany) D Nyenhuis
(Malaysia) A Azahar (Malaysia) Tan CS	15	14	3
(Chinese Taipei) Chen H-l (Chinese Taipei) Yeh C-h	13	17	15

Second round
(Germany) D Domke (Germany) D Nyenhuis	12	13
(Singapore) D Wong (Singapore) A Tan	15	15
(Canada) R Liang (Canada) A Pang	9	13
5/8	(Indonesia) M Rijal (Indonesia) I Agung	15	15
(Chinese Taipei) Chen H-l (Chinese Taipei) Yeh C-h	15	15
(Peru) M del Valle (Peru) A de Vinatea	4	2
(Sweden) M Wigardt (Sweden) H Hurskainen	WO
3/4	(China) Shen Y (China) He HB

Third round
(Singapore) D Wong (Singapore) A Tan	6	7
5/8	(Indonesia) M Rijal (Indonesia) I Agung	15	15
(Chinese Taipei) Chen H-l (Chinese Taipei) Yeh C-h	5	8
3/4	(China) Shen Y (China) He HB	15	15

Quarter finals
5/8	(Indonesia) M Rijal (Indonesia) I Agung	15	8	16
3/4	(China) Shen Y (China) He HB	9	15	17

==== Section 4 ====
First round
(Hong Kong) Hui WH (Hong Kong) Leung CY	15	9	9
(Thailand) S Viboonsin (Thailand) T Huansuriya	11	15	15
(Netherlands) L Oey (Netherlands) J de Ruiter	8	3
(Denmark) R Bonde (Denmark) K Henriksen	15	15

Second round
(Thailand) S Viboonsin (Thailand) T Huansuriya	15	15
(Guatemala) K Cordón (Guatemala) R Ramírez	3	2
(Russia) V Malkov (Russia) K Khlestov	15	17
5/8	(Japan) K Oshima (Japan) J Tamura	10	14
(Denmark) R Bonde (Denmark) K Henriksen
(Jamaica) V Tolan (Peru) S Salazar	WO
(United States) A Ali (United States) S Ali	0	1
2	(South Korea) Lee Y-d (South Korea) Jung J-y	15	15

Third round
(Thailand) S Viboonsin (Thailand) T Huansuriya	9	10
(Russia) V Malkov (Russia) K Khlestov	15	15
(Denmark) R Bonde (Denmark) K Henriksen	9	15	2
2	(South Korea) Lee Y-d (South Korea) Jung J-y	15	6	15

Quarter finals
(Russia) V Malkov (Russia) K Khlestov	2	1
2	(South Korea) Lee Y-d (South Korea) Jung J-y	15	15
