= Lee Yong-dae =

South Korean badminton player (born 1988)

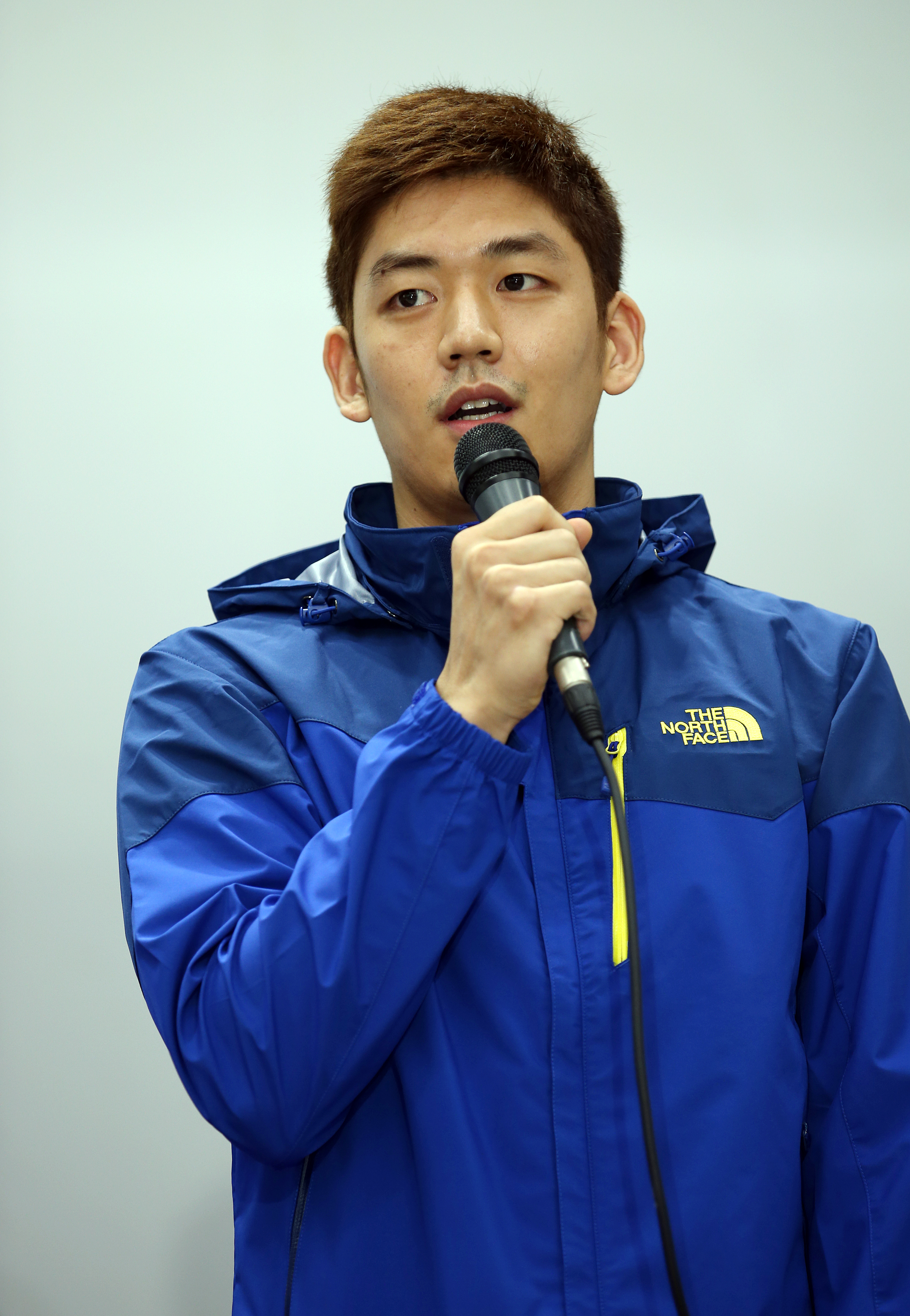
- Lee in 2014

Personal information
- Born: 11 September 1988 (age 38) Hwasun, South Jeolla, South Korea
- Years active: 2003–2018, 2019–present
- Height: 1.76 m (5 ft 9 in)
- Weight: 76.2 kg (168 lb)

Sport
- Country: South Korea
- Sport: Badminton
- Handedness: Right
- Coached by: Kang Kyung-jin

Men's & mixed doubles
- Highest ranking: 1 (MD with Jung Jae-sung 22 January 2009); 1 (MD with Ko Sung-hyun 30 May 2013); 1 (MD with Yoo Yeon-seong 14 August 2014); 1 (XD with Lee Hyo-jung 2009)
- Current ranking: 31 (MD with Kim Gi-jung 17 March 2020)
- BWF profile
Medal record
Men's badminton
Representing South Korea
Olympic Games
Gold medal – first place	2008 Beijing	Mixed doubles
Bronze medal – third place	2012 London	Men's doubles
World Championships
Silver medal – second place	2007 Kuala Lumpur	Men's doubles
Silver medal – second place	2009 Hyderabad	Men's doubles
Silver medal – second place	2014 Copenhagen	Men's doubles
Bronze medal – third place	2009 Hyderabad	Mixed doubles
Bronze medal – third place	2011 London	Men's doubles
Bronze medal – third place	2015 Jakarta	Men's doubles
Sudirman Cup
Silver medal – second place	2009 Guangzhou	Mixed team
Silver medal – second place	2013 Kuala Lumpur	Mixed team
Bronze medal – third place	2011 Qingdao	Mixed team
Bronze medal – third place	2015 Dongguan	Mixed team
Thomas Cup
Silver medal – second place	2008 Jakarta	Men's team
Silver medal – second place	2012 Wuhan	Men's team
Bronze medal – third place	2016 Kunshan	Men's team
Asian Games
Gold medal – first place	2014 Incheon	Men's team
Silver medal – second place	2006 Doha	Men's team
Silver medal – second place	2010 Guangzhou	Men's team
Silver medal – second place	2014 Incheon	Men's doubles
Bronze medal – third place	2006 Doha	Men's doubles
Bronze medal – third place	2010 Guangzhou	Men's doubles
Asian Championships
Gold medal – first place	2008 Johor Bahru	Men's doubles
Gold medal – first place	2009 Suwon	Mixed doubles
Gold medal – first place	2013 Taipei	Men's doubles
Gold medal – first place	2015 Wuhan	Men's doubles
Gold medal – first place	2016 Wuhan	Men's doubles
Summer Universiade
Gold medal – first place	2013 Kazan	Men's doubles
Gold medal – first place	2013 Kazan	Mixed team
Gold medal – first place	2015 Gwangju	Mixed team
World Junior Championships
Gold medal – first place	2006 Incheon	Boys' doubles
Gold medal – first place	2006 Incheon	Mixed doubles
Gold medal – first place	2006 Incheon	Mixed team
Silver medal – second place	2004 Richmond	Boys' doubles
Silver medal – second place	2004 Richmond	Mixed team
Bronze medal – third place	2004 Richmond	Mixed doubles
Asian Junior Championships
Gold medal – first place	2004 Hwacheon	Boys' doubles
Gold medal – first place	2005 Jakarta	Boys' doubles
Gold medal – first place	2005 Jakarta	Mixed doubles
Gold medal – first place	2005 Jakarta	Boys' team
Gold medal – first place	2006 Kuala Lumpur	Boys' doubles
Gold medal – first place	2006 Kuala Lumpur	Mixed doubles
Gold medal – first place	2006 Kuala Lumpur	Mixed team
Silver medal – second place	2004 Hwacheon	Boys' team
Bronze medal – third place	2004 Hwacheon	Mixed doubles

Lee Yong-dae (Korean: 이용대; Hanja: 李龍大; Korean pronunciation: [i.joŋ.dɛ̝]; born 11 September 1988) is a South Korean professional badminton player who had been successful in both the men's and mixed doubles. He reached world number 1 ranking with 4 different partners, Jung Jae-sung, Ko Sung-hyun and Yoo Yeon-seong in the men's doubles, and Lee Hyo-jung in the mixed doubles. He won a total of 43 Superseries titles, 37 in the men's doubles, the most of any doubles player in one discipline, and 6 in mixed doubles. He was ranked world number 1 in men's doubles for 117 consecutive weeks with his last partner, Yoo Yeon-seong.

After winning the 2016 Korean Superseries with Yoo, Lee announced his retirement from international badminton. He made a comeback to the international stage at the end of 2017, and started a new partnership with Kim Gi-jung in 2018. Lee was inducted to BWF Badminton Hall of Fame on 9 December 2024.

== Early life ==
Lee started playing badminton at his local elementary school at the age of 8, taking up the sport to lose weight. When he first began competing internationally, in 2003, he was a member of the Hwasun Middle School team, then he was with Hwasun Vocational High School until the end of his junior days in 2006, before joining the Samsung Electromechanics team in 2006. He joined the national badminton team of South Korea in 2003, at the age of 15 years.

== Career ==
=== 2003 ===
Lee participated in the OCBC/Yonex US Open, where he played in both the singles and doubles category. In both events, he was ousted in the second round.

=== 2004 ===
Lee started off 2004 with the French Open International, where he played in the singles, men's doubles (with Jung Jung-young) and mixed doubles (with Kang Hae-won). In the mixed doubles event, the pair managed to reach the semi-finals, before losing to the Russians. He participated in several other tournaments without any major results. At the Vietnam Satellite, he reached the quarter-finals in the mixed doubles category, partnering Oh Seul-ki.

=== 2005 ===
Still struggling to find the right partner, he played several tournaments without getting any big results. However, he did reach the finals of the Cheers Asian Satellite in the mixed and men's doubles category. He won the gold medals at the Asian Junior Championships in the boys' doubles, mixed doubles and team events.

=== 2006 ===
In July, Lee repeated his achievements at the Asian Junior by capturing three gold medals at the Championships held in Cheras, Kuala Lumpur, Malaysia where he played a pivotal role to secure the boys' doubles and mixed doubles victories for South Korea and frustrate Malaysia in the mixed team final.

In November, Lee made another gold medal hat trick at the World Junior Championships where he led team Korea to their first world junior championship, never dropping a single set in boys' doubles, mixed doubles and mixed team event through the tournament.

Lee won two titles at the Thailand Open in the men's doubles with Jung Jae-sung and mixed doubles with Ha Jung-eun.

At the Asian Games, Lee and Jung became bronze medalist after losing the semi-finals to Luluk Hadiyanto and Alvent Yulianto of Indonesia in the individual men's doubles event. In the team event, South Korea lost to China in the final 2–3, thus gaining Lee a silver medal.

=== 2007 ===
In January, Lee and Jung participated in the Malaysia Open, the first ever BWF Super Series event. There they got through the first round but had to resign from the tournament due to injury. However a week later they blew away competition to take the first prize at the Korea Open. On top of that, Lee also won the mixed doubles with Lee Hyo-jung. Lee and Jung lost to Hwang Ji-man and Lee Jae-jin in the final of the German Open; in mixed doubles Lee and Lee Hyo-jung lost to Zheng Bo and Gao Ling of China in the semi-finals. Zheng and Gao went on to win the tournament.

At the Swiss Open, Lee and Lee Hyo-jung took another title, winning the final in three games. For the rest of the year there were no good results in mixed doubles for Lee, mainly because he didn't participate or played with another partner. In men's doubles, he and Jung were eliminated in a disappointing second round.

Lee participated in the 2007 Sudirman Cup with the South Korea team. The team lost to China in the semi-finals with a score of 0–3.

In July, after a period of disappointing results in men's doubles, Lee became runner-up with Jung at the Thailand Open, losing to Hwang Ji-man and Lee Jae-jin. Not much later, the pair went on to take the silver medal in the 2007 BWF World Championships. They were defeated in the final by Markis Kido and Hendra Setiawan of Indonesia, 19–21, 19–21. In mixed doubles, Lee reached the third round with Lee Hyo-jung. There they lost to Nathan Robertson and Gail Emms of England in three games. With Jung Jae-sung, the rest of the year also resulted in quite disappointing achievements, as he failed to pass the quarterfinals in any major events, except in the French Open. Lee and Jung there lost to the eventual winners, Cai Yun and Fu Haifeng of China.

=== 2008 ===
To start 2008, Lee, together with Jung, disappointingly lost to an unseeded pair in the second round of the Malaysia Open. Mixed doubles went better for Lee and Lee Hyo-jung this time, finishing as runners-up. They lost to He Hanbin and Yu Yang of China. In South Korea, things went a bit better in men's doubles, achieving a quarterfinal. Lee and Jung lost to runners-up Luluk Hadiyanto and Alvent Yulianto of Indonesia there, but in mixed doubles Lee and his partner won the title against Flandy Limpele and Vita Marissa of Indonesia.

More than a month later, Lee and Jung came back with a bang to win the 2008 All England Open, beating Choong Tan Fook and Lee Wan Wah in a thrilling semi-final (coming back from a 16–20 deficit in the third game) and Hwang Ji-man and Lee Jae-jin, also from Korea, in the final. In mixed doubles with Lee Hyo-jung, they lost in the quarter-finals to eventual winners Zheng Bo and Gao Ling. A week later, Lee was victorious with Jung in the Swiss Open too. In mixed doubles they lost against He Hanbin and Yu Yang, who went on to the semi-finals.

At the Asian Championships Lee and Jung became winners, beating Nova Widianto and Candra Wijaya of Indonesia in the final.

Lee and Jung pair were the only ones to score a point for South Korea against China in the Thomas Cup final, which ended in a 3–1 win for China.

==== 2008 Olympics ====
Not having participated in the two Super Series events prior to the Olympics, supposedly because of their preparations for the Summer Olympics, Lee was disappointingly knocked out in the first round in Beijing with Jung. However, Lee and Lee Hyo-jung upset the badminton world and went on to get the gold medal in mixed doubles, becoming the youngest gold medalists in Olympic badminton.

=== 2009 ===
Lee Yong-dae started the year brightly when he and Jung Jae-sung won the Malaysia Open. In the Korea Open Super Series, Lee won the mixed doubles title with Lee Hyo-jung, while he and Jung reached the final. However, as Jung had to join the military service for two months, Lee paired with Shin Baek-cheol for the German Open and claimed the title. In the Swiss Open Super Series, Lee Yong-dae and Lee Hyo-jung reached the mixed doubles final but failed to capture the trophy as they lost to China's Zheng Bo and Ma Jin. A month later, they subdued teammates Yoo Yeon-seong and Kim Min-jung to clinch the Asian Championships title.

In the Sudirman Cup on May 10–17, Lee Yong-dae brought South Korea to the final to meet defending champion China. Lee won in both the men's doubles and mixed doubles events. However, in the final, he and Lee Hyo-jung lost to Zheng Bo and Yu Yang, while a few hours later he and Jung Jae-sung also lost to Cai Yun and Fu Haifeng. China then won the cup for the third consecutive time.

In June, Lee Yong-dae played in the Singapore Open Super Series, but he did not win the title. In Indonesia a week later, he reached both the finals of men's doubles and mixed doubles event. Again, he and Lee Hyo-jung were defeated by Zheng Bo and Ma Jin, the Chinese pair who beat them in Singapore semi-final. Happily, he took the men's doubles title with Jung Jae-sung, conquering China's top pair Cai Yun and Fu Haifeng.

In August, Lee Yong-dae participated in the World Championships in [Hyderabad, India. Unfortunately, in the mixed doubles, he and Lee Hyo-jung, who were the first seeds, lost to Thomas Laybourn and Kamilla Rytter Juhl of Denmark in the semi-final, who later became the champions. He had a better run with Jung Jae-sung in the men's doubles, reaching the final, but lost to Chinese pair Cai and Fu.

In November, after a two-month absence due to injury, Lee Yong-dae returned to play in Hong Kong Open. Though he and Lee Hyo-jung lost in the first round, he fared better in the men's doubles with Jung Jae-sung. In the final, they defeated Lars Paaske and Jonas Rasmussen of Denmark.

Only a week later, Lee successfully defended his two titles in China Open Super Series. He and Lee Hyo-jung beat Zheng Bo and Ma Jin in the mixed doubles final. With Jung, he defeated Koo Kien Keat and Tan Boon Heong in men's doubles final.

In December, Lee and Jung participated in Superseries Finals in Johor Bahru, Malaysia. Unbelievably, they did not drop a single set from the group stage to the final. In the final, they outclassed Denmark's Mathias Boe and Carsten Mogensen, whom they had subdued in the group stage.

=== 2010 ===
On January 17, Lee Yong-dae successfully started the 2010 year by winning Korea Open Super Series in Seoul with Jung Jae-sung. In the final, the top seeds defeated Cai Yun and Fu Haifeng of China 21–11, 14–21, and 21–18. However, in the mixed doubles, Lee who paired with Lee Hyo-jung were subdued 13–21 and 16–21 by Chinese pair Tao Jiaming and Zhang Yawen in the first round. The same pair defeated Lee and Lee in the second round of Malaysia Open a week later without a match.

In March's All England Championship, Lee Yong-dae and Lee Hyo-jung reached the semi-finals, playing Nova Widianto and Liliyana Natsir. The third seeds lost to the Indonesian pair 16–21, 21–18, and 8–21. With Jung Jae-sung in the men's doubles, Lee only made it to the quarter-finals, defeated 18–21, 10–21 by Xu Chen and Guo Zhendong of China.

Lee Yong-dae and Lee Hyo-jung grabbed their first title of the year in Swiss Open Super Series after subduing compatriots Shin Baek-cheol and Yoo Hyun-young in straight sets, 21–14 and 21–18.

Lee Yong-dae was absent from the Thomas Cup due to injury. However, his comeback was successful as he and Jung Jae-sung won the first tournament they played after the injury, Chinese Taipei Grand Prix Gold. The third seeds beat compatriot Cho Gun-woo and Kwon Yi-goo.

In the Asian Games in November, Lee Yong-dae and Jung Jae-sung helped South Korea men's team to reach the final. They beat Chinese Cai Yun and Fu Haifeng in the final, yet Korea was failed to win the gold medal as China downed Korea 3–1. For the individual event, Lee Yong-dae and Jung Jae-sung gained the bronze medal after beaten by Indonesia's Markis Kido and Hendra Setiawan in the last four.

=== 2011 ===
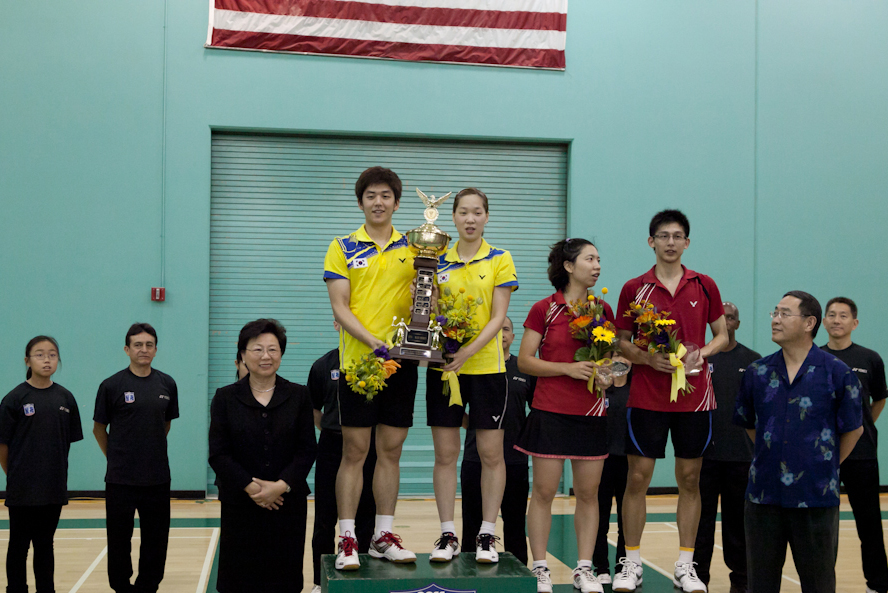
Lee won the mixed doubles title at the 2011 U.S. Open partnered with Ha Jung-eun

Lee Yong-dae started the 2011 season with a not-so-satisfying result in the 2010 Superseries Finals in Taiwan as he and Jung Jae-sung finished as runner-up. However, their disappointment disappeared after they became the first winner of Korea Open Super Series Premier in January. In the final, they conquered top-seeded Denmark's Mathias Boe and Carsten Mogensen easily, 21–6 and 21–13.

With the retirement of Lee Hyo-jung, Lee has now paired with Ha Jung-eun in the mixed doubles. They won the US Open Grand Prix Gold in July with a 21–19, 21–13 win over fifth-seeded Chen Hung-ling and Cheng Wen-hsing of Chinese Taipei, also won the men's doubles with Ko Sung-hyun beating Howard Bach and Tony Gunawan of United States in the final. The next week, he participated in the Canada Open at the Richmond Olympic Oval. With Ko, he won the title. However, in the mixed doubles, Lee and his partner, Ha Jung-eun, lost to qualifier Liu Cheng and Luo Ying in the second round.

In September, Lee Yong-dae and Jung Jae-sung won China Masters title after defeating China's Cai Yun and Fu Haifeng 21–17, 21–10. Lee also played in Japan Open, pairing with Ko Sung-hyun again, but they lost in the quarter-finals against Indonesia's Markis Kido and Hendra Setiawan.

In October, Lee Yong-dae and Jung Jae-sung once again defeated Cai Yun and Fu Haifeng 21–16, 21–17 to win Denmark Open Super Series Premier. Lee and Jung were again victorious against Cai and Fu in three sets, 14–21 21–15 21–11, to win the French Super Series title.

=== 2012 ===
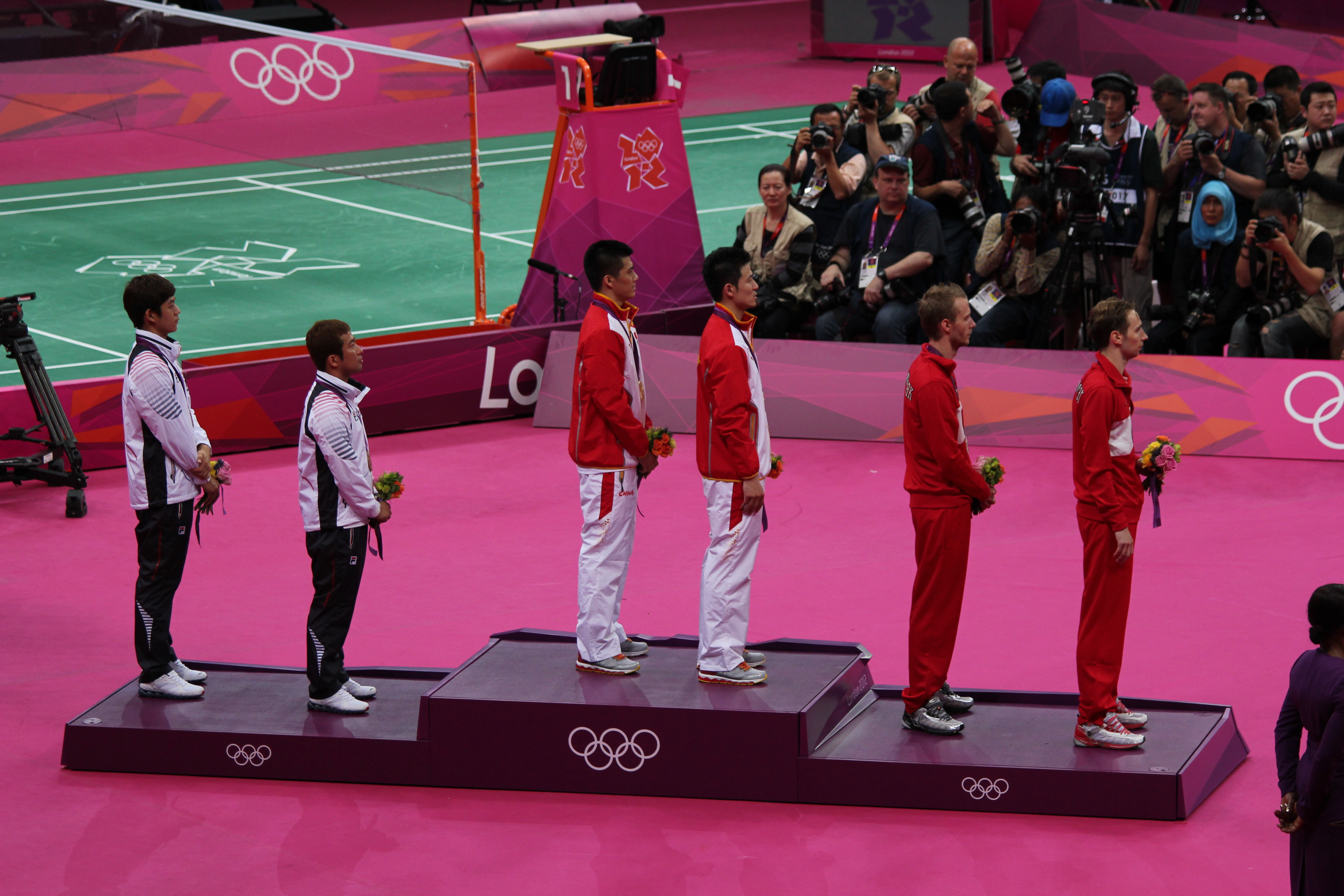
Lee Yong-dae (left) at the podium of 2012 London Olympics

Lee Yong-dae and Jung Jae-sung didn't start off the year so well with a loss in their home game at the 2012 Korea Open Super Series Premier losing to Cai Yun and Fu Haifeng in three sets, 18–21 21–17 21–19. In German Open, Lee and Jung reached the final but lost to unseeded Chinese pair, Hong Wei and Shen Ye.

However, they managed to win against Cai and Fu again in March to win their second All England Open title with a 21–23, 21–9, and 21–14 victory.

In June, Lee Yong-dae and Jung Jae-sung won their second Indonesia Open title after defeating Danish Mathias Boe and Carsten Mogensen 23–21, 19–21, and 21–11. His record against the Danish players was good but unfortunately, in their last meeting in 2012 in the semi-final of 2012 Olympic Games was won by the Danish players in 3 thrilling sets, breaking Koreans' hope to take the gold medals. Instead they had to be satisfied with bronze medals.

After the 2012 Olympic Games, South Korean national team coach, Kim Joong-soo, decided to pairing Lee with Ko Sung-hyun focusing in the men's doubles.

=== 2013 ===
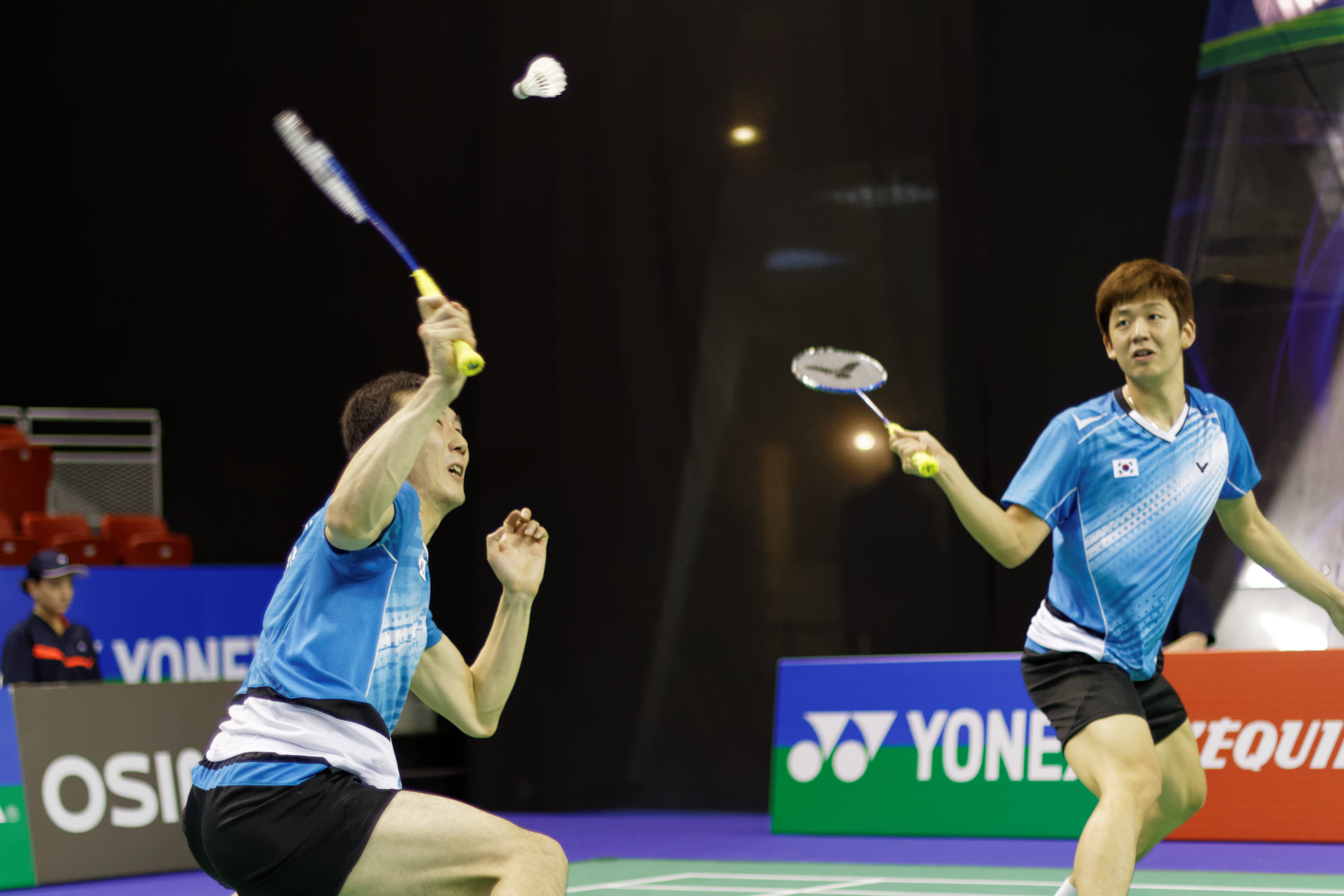
Lee with his partner Yoo Yeon-Seong at the 2013 French Open

Lee Yong-dae started the year with his new partner Ko Sung-hyun winning the Korea Open against Mathias Boe and Carsten Mogensen 19–21, 21–13, 21–10. They then entered the Malaysia Open and placed second losing to Indonesian pairs Mohammad Ahsan and Hendra Setiawan 15–21, 13–21. After the Malaysian Open, the pair failed to perform losing 14–21, 14–21 to Liu Xiaolong and Qiu Zihan of China in the quarter-finals of the German Open. A week later, the pair lost again in round one of the All England Open to unseeded German Pair Ingo Kindervater and Johannes Schoettler 21–23, 18–21. At the India Open in April, the pair lost in the final to Liu Xiaolong and Qiu Zihan of China 20–22, 18–21.

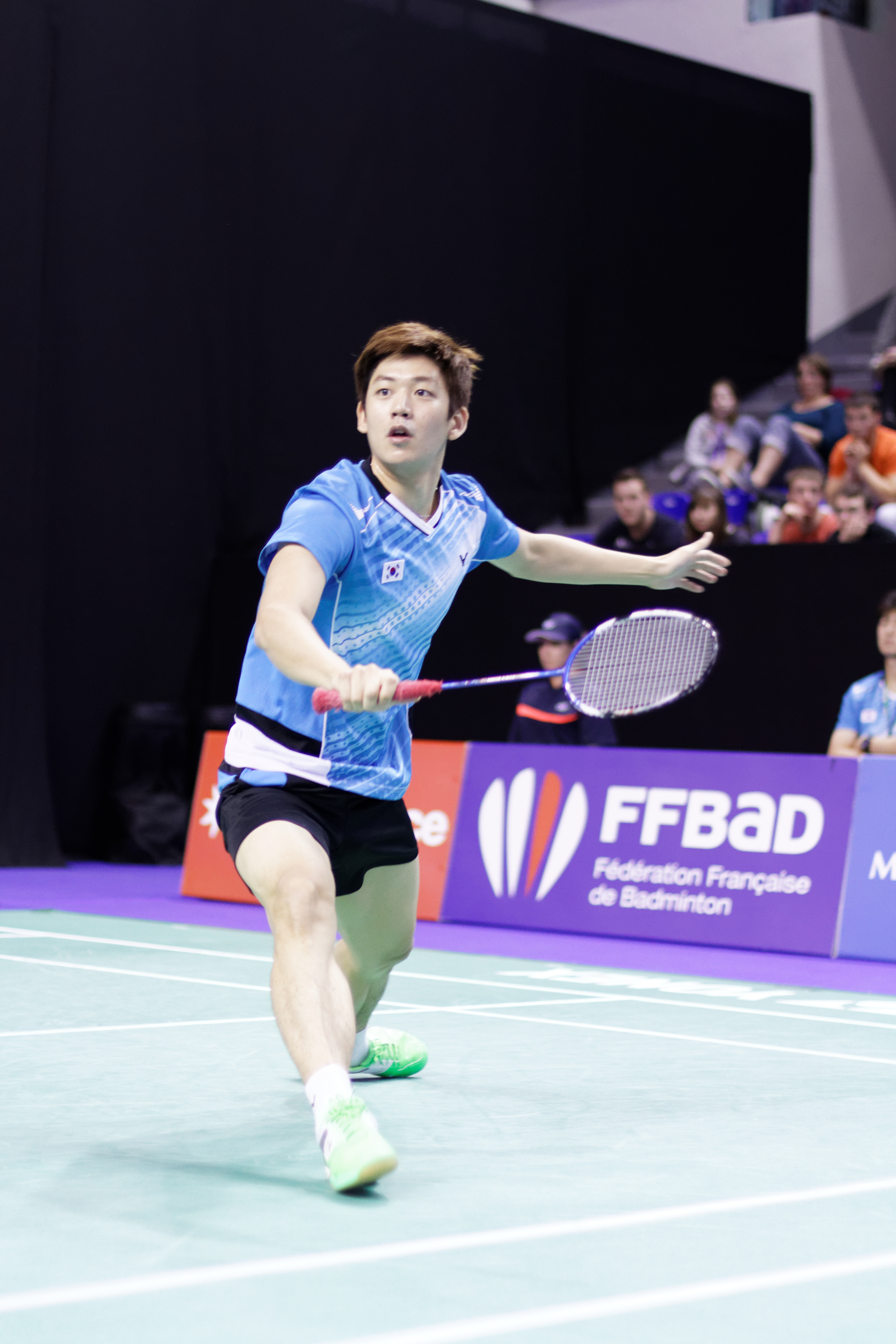
Lee in 2013

After a one-year partnership, Lee Yong-dae and Ko Sung-hyun split and Lee paired with current world #8 and Ko's former partner Yoo Yeon-Seong. This partnership won two consecutive tournaments 2013 Denmark Super Series Premier and China Open.

=== 2014 ===
In January, Lee Yong-dae and Kim Gi-jung were banned for a year by the BWF from playing any international tournament due to their absence during a drug test. However, after further investigation, the ban was lifted several months later due to lack of evidence and claims that their absence was due to a misunderstanding with the Badminton Association of Korea.

Lee immediately returned to the badminton scene in May by contributing to the national squad at the 2014 Thomas Cup. South Korea came in second to Malaysia in the group stage but eventually lost 2–3 to Indonesia in the quarter-finals.

In June, Lee and his partner, Yoo Yeon-Seong consecutively won 3 Superseries titles in 3 weeks which were the Japan Open, Indonesian Open and Australian Open. This made the pair go up two spots in the world rankings from No. 4 to No. 2. They are currently ranking No. 1 in the world.

In 2014 World Championships men's doubles final, Lee and Yoo Yeon-Seong surprisingly lost to their compatriots Ko Sung Hyun and Shin Baek-cheol 20–22, 23–21, 18–21. Therefore, Lee won his third silver medal in World Championships.

=== 2015 ===
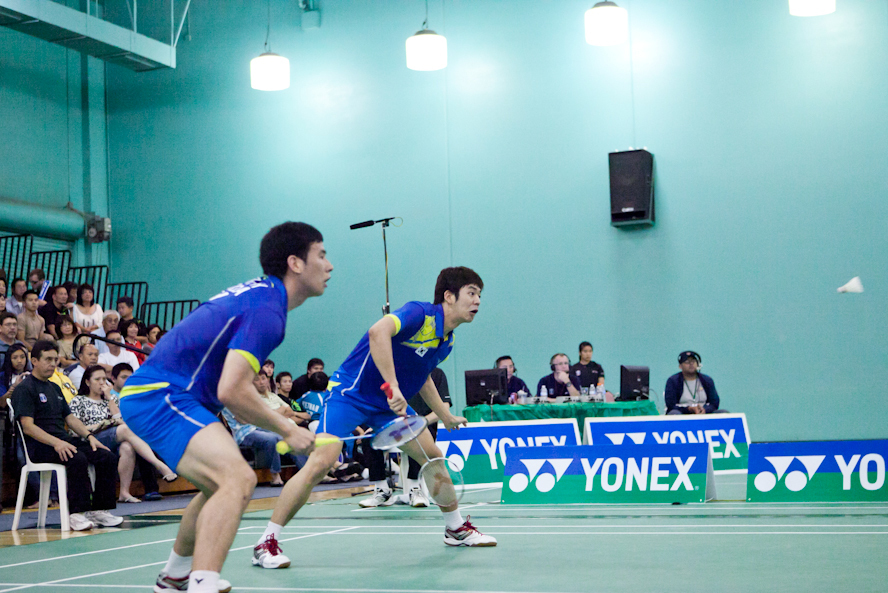
Lee defending against a smash; he is known as one of the best defensive players in badminton

Lee Yong-dae had a bright year in 2015 despite a slow start to the year. He won a total of 6 Superseries titles, 4 consecutively, namely Australia, Japan, Korea, Denmark, France and Hong Kong with partner Yoo Yeon Seong, and were top seeds for the Dubai Superseries finals, despite losing to Indonesian rivals Mohammad Ahsan and Hendra Setiawan in the semi-finals.

=== 2016 ===
Lee Yong-dae and partner Yoo Yeon-seong started off the year at the 2016 German Open Grand Prix Gold and lost to compatriots Ko Sung-hyun and Shin Baek-cheol in the finals. They reached the semi-finals at the 2016 All England Super Series Premier but suffered a shock loss to unseeded Russian pair Vladimir Ivanov and Ivan Sozonov, who went on to take their first Super Series title. They also reached the semi-finals stage of the 2016 Malaysia Super Series Premier and the 2016 Singapore Super Series, but were knocked out by compatriots Kim Gi-jung and Kim Sa-rang, and Chinese pair Fu Haifeng and Zhang Nan, respectively. Both pairs went on to win the tournaments. Lee and Yoo won their first title of 2016 at the China Masters against Kim Gi-jung and Kim Sa-rang, and their second at the Asian Championships against unseeded Chinese pairing of Li Junhui and Liu Yuchen. They then contested the 2016 Thomas Cup representing Korea, and won three out of four matches they played, their only loss coming from eventual finalists, Indonesia's Ahsan and Setiawan. Lee and Yoo then won their first Superseries title of the year, and their third in total, at the Indonesia Open, beating China's fifth seeds Chai Biao and Hong Wei in the final. They represented Korea at the 2016 Summer Olympics as the top seeds, but crashed out in the quarter-finals to unseeded Malaysian pair Goh V Shem and Tan Wee Kiong which was their second losses in 9 meetings with the Malaysian pair. Lee announced that he would retire following the 2016 Summer Olympics, with his last tournament being the Korea Open in September in which he won alongside his partner Yoo Yeon-seong against the Chinese Li and Liu pair.

=== 2018 ===
Lee Yong-dae made a comeback in the men's doubles and partnered up with Kim Gi-jung, and won the titles of Spain Masters and Macau Open.

=== 2020 ===
Lee began the 2020 season by winning the Malaysia Masters with Kim Gi-jung. The duo claimed the title after beating third seeded Chinese pair Li Junhui and Liu Yuchen in the final in two straight games.

== Personal life ==
Lee's gold medal win at the 2008 Olympics, his first appearance at the Olympic Games, propelled him from relative obscurity to national fame. He has since made several appearances on the sports-themed variety show Our Neighborhood Arts and Physical Education.

Lee start dating actress Byun Soo-mi in 2011 and went public with their relationship in 2012. The two met at a badminton event hosted by Byun's father. On February 8, 2017, Lee announced they were engaged and planned to have a small private wedding ceremony. On April 10, 2017, their daughter was born, and her growth was documented in the KBS reality show Pot Stand. The couple divorced in December 2018 and Lee has sole custody of their daughter.

== Achievements ==
=== Olympic Games ===
Men's doubles
Year	Venue	Partner	Opponent	Score	Result
2012	Wembley Arena, London, Great Britain	(South Korea) Jung Jae-sung	(Malaysia) Koo Kien Keat (Malaysia) Tan Boon Heong	23–21, 21–10	Bronze

Mixed doubles
Year	Venue	Partner	Opponent	Score	Result
2008	Beijing University of Technology Gymnasium, Beijing, China	(South Korea) Lee Hyo-jung	(Indonesia) Nova Widianto (Indonesia) Liliyana Natsir	21–11, 21–17	Gold

=== BWF World Championships ===
Men's doubles
Year	Venue	Partner	Opponent	Score	Result
2007	Putra Indoor Stadium, Kuala Lumpur, Malaysia	(South Korea) Jung Jae-sung	(Indonesia) Markis Kido (Indonesia) Hendra Setiawan	19–21, 19–21	Silver
2009	Gachibowli Indoor Stadium, Hyderabad, India	(South Korea) Jung Jae-sung	(China) Cai Yun (China) Fu Haifeng	18–21, 21–16, 26–28	Silver
2011	Wembley Arena, London, England	(South Korea) Jung Jae-sung	(China) Cai Yun (China) Fu Haifeng	18–21, 14–21	Bronze
2014	Ballerup Super Arena, Copenhagen, Denmark	(South Korea) Yoo Yeon-seong	(South Korea) Ko Sung-hyun (South Korea) Shin Baek-cheol	20–22, 23–21, 18–21	Silver
2015	Istora Senayan, Jakarta, Indonesia	(South Korea) Yoo Yeon-seong	(Indonesia) Mohammad Ahsan (Indonesia) Hendra Setiawan	17–21, 19–21	Bronze

Mixed doubles
Year	Venue	Partner	Opponent	Score	Result
2009	Gachibowli Indoor Stadium, Hyderabad, India	(South Korea) Lee Hyo-jung	(Denmark) Thomas Laybourn (Denmark) Kamilla Rytter Juhl	21–18, 9–21, 18–21	Bronze

=== Asian Games ===
Men's doubles
Year	Venue	Partner	Opponent	Score	Result
2006	Aspire Hall 3, Doha, Qatar	(South Korea) Jung Jae-sung	(Indonesia) Luluk Hadiyanto (Indonesia) Alvent Yulianto	25–23, 18–21, 19–21	Bronze
2010	Tianhe Gymnasium, Guangzhou, China	(South Korea) Jung Jae-sung	(Indonesia) Markis Kido (Indonesia) Hendra Setiawan	15–21, 21–13, 18–21	Bronze
2014	Gyeyang Gymnasium, Incheon, South Korea	(South Korea) Yoo Yeon-seong	(Indonesia) Mohammad Ahsan (Indonesia) Hendra Setiawan	16–21, 21–16, 17–21	Silver

=== Asian Championships ===
Men's doubles
Year	Venue	Partner	Opponent	Score	Result
2008	Bandaraya Stadium, Johor Bahru, Malaysia	(South Korea) Jung Jae-sung	(Indonesia) Nova Widianto (Indonesia) Candra Wijaya	21–16, 21–18	Gold
2013	Taipei Arena, Taipei, Taiwan	(South Korea) Ko Sung-hyun	(South Korea) Kim Gi-jung (South Korea) Kim Sa-rang	21–13, 22–20	Gold
2015	Wuhan Sports Center Gymnasium, Wuhan, China	(South Korea) Yoo Yeon-seong	(Indonesia) Mohammad Ahsan (Indonesia) Hendra Setiawan	18–21, 24–22, 21–19	Gold
2016	Wuhan Sports Center Gymnasium, Wuhan, China	(South Korea) Yoo Yeon-seong	(China) Li Junhui (China) Liu Yuchen	21–14, 28–26	Gold

Mixed doubles
Year	Venue	Partner	Opponent	Score	Result
2009	Suwon Indoor Stadium, Suwon, South Korea	(South Korea) Lee Hyo-jung	(South Korea) Yoo Yeon-seong (South Korea) Kim Min-jung	21–12, 21–15	Gold

=== Summer Universiade ===
Men's doubles
Year	Venue	Partner	Opponent	Score	Result
2013	Tennis Academy, Kazan, Russia	(South Korea) Ko Sung-hyun	(Russia) Vladimir Ivanov (Russia) Ivan Sozonov	13–21, 21–13, 21–13	Gold

=== World Junior Championships ===
Boys' doubles
Year	Venue	Partner	Opponent	Score	Result
2004	Minoru Arena, Richmond, Canada	(South Korea) Jung Jung-young	(Malaysia) Hoon Thien How (Malaysia) Tan Boon Heong	6–15, 15–3, 12–15	Silver
2006	Samsan World Gymnasium, Incheon, South Korea	(South Korea) Cho Gun-woo	(China) Liu Xiaolong (China) Li Tian	21–12, 21–16	Gold

Mixed doubles
Year	Venue	Partner	Opponent	Score	Result
2004	Minoru Arena, Richmond, Canada	(South Korea) Park Soo-hee	(Indonesia) Muhammad Rijal (Indonesia) Greysia Polii	5–15, 15–17	Bronze
2006	Samsan World Gymnasium, Incheon, South Korea	(South Korea) Yoo Hyun-young	(China) Li Tian (China) Ma Jin	18–21, 21–19, 21–14	Gold

=== Asian Junior Championships ===
Boys' doubles
Year	Venue	Partner	Opponent	Score	Result
2004	Hwacheon Indoor Stadium, Hwacheon, South Korea	(South Korea) Jung Jung-young	(South Korea) Jeon Jun-bum (South Korea) Yoo Yeon-seong	15–11, 15–3	Gold
2005	Tennis Indoor Senayan, Jakarta, Indonesia	(South Korea) Cho Gun-woo	(China) Shen Ye (China) Zhang Wei	8–15, 15–8, 15–8	Gold
2006	Kuala Lumpur Badminton Stadium, Kuala Lumpur, Malaysia	(South Korea) Cho Gun-woo	(Malaysia) Mohamad Arif Abdul Latif (Malaysia) Vountus Indra Mawan	21–12, 21–9	Gold

Mixed doubles
Year	Venue	Partner	Opponent	Score	Result
2004	Hwacheon Indoor Stadium, Hwacheon, South Korea	(South Korea) Kang Hae-won	(China) Shen Ye (China) Feng Chen	7–15, 6–15	Bronze
2005	Tennis Indoor Senayan, Jakarta, Indonesia	(South Korea) Ha Jung-eun	(China) Zhang Wei (China) Liao Jingmei	11–15, 15–8, 15–2	Gold
2006	Kuala Lumpur Badminton Stadium, Kuala Lumpur, Malaysia	(South Korea) Yoo Hyun-young	(Malaysia) Tan Wee Kiong (Malaysia) Woon Khe Wei	21–15, 21–9	Gold

=== BWF World Tour (3 titles) ===
The BWF World Tour, which was announced on 19 March 2017 and implemented in 2018, is a series of elite badminton tournaments sanctioned by the Badminton World Federation (BWF). The BWF World Tours are divided into levels of World Tour Finals, Super 1000, Super 750, Super 500, Super 300 (part of the HSBC World Tour), and the BWF Tour Super 100.

Men's doubles
Year	Tournament	Level	Partner	Opponent	Score	Result
2018	Spain Masters	Super 300	(South Korea) Kim Gi-jung	(Thailand) Bodin Isara (Thailand) Maneepong Jongjit	21–13, 21–17	(gold) Winner
2018	Macau Open	Super 300	(South Korea) Kim Gi-jung	(South Korea) Ko Sung-hyun (South Korea) Shin Baek-cheol	17–21, 21–13, 21–19	(gold) Winner
2020	Malaysia Masters	Super 500	(South Korea) Kim Gi-jung	(China) Li Junhui (China) Liu Yuchen	21–14, 21–16	(gold) Winner

=== BWF Superseries (43 titles, 18 runners-up) ===
The BWF Superseries, which was launched on 14 December 2006 and implemented in 2007, was a series of elite badminton tournaments, sanctioned by the Badminton World Federation (BWF). BWF Superseries levels were Superseries and Superseries Premier. A season of Superseries consisted of twelve tournaments around the world that had been introduced since 2011. Successful players were invited to the Superseries Finals, which were held at the end of each year.

Men's doubles
Year	Tournament	Partner	Opponent	Score	Result
2007	Korea Open	(South Korea) Jung Jae-sung	(South Korea) Hwang Ji-man (South Korea) Lee Jae-jin	21–16, 21–15	(gold) Winner
2008	All England Open	(South Korea) Jung Jae-sung	(South Korea) Hwang Ji-man (South Korea) Lee Jae-jin	20–22, 21–19, 21–18	(gold) Winner
2008	Swiss Open	(South Korea) Jung Jae-sung	(Indonesia) Markis Kido (Indonesia) Hendra Setiawan	17–21, 21–16, 21–13	(gold) Winner
2008	China Open	(South Korea) Jung Jae-sung	(Denmark) Mathias Boe (Denmark) Carsten Mogensen	17–21, 21–17, 21–13	(gold) Winner
2008	Hong Kong Open	(South Korea) Jung Jae-sung	(Malaysia) Mohd Zakry Abdul Latif (Malaysia) Mohd Fairuzizuan Mohd Tazari	25–23, 19–21, 22–20	(gold) Winner
2008	World Superseries Masters Finals	(South Korea) Jung Jae-sung	(Malaysia) Koo Kien Keat (Malaysia) Tan Boon Heong	18–21, 14–21	(silver) Runner-up
2009	Malaysia Open	(South Korea) Jung Jae-sung	(Indonesia) Hendra Aprida Gunawan (Indonesia) Alvent Yulianto	18–21, 21–14, 21–14	(gold) Winner
2009	Korea Open	(South Korea) Jung Jae-sung	(Denmark) Mathias Boe (Denmark) Carsten Mogensen	12–21, 22–24	(silver) Runner-up
2009	Indonesia Open	(South Korea) Jung Jae-sung	(China) Cai Yun (China) Fu Haifeng	21–15, 21–18	(gold) Winner
2009	Hong Kong Open	(South Korea) Jung Jae-sung	(Denmark) Lars Paaske (Denmark) Jonas Rasmussen	13–21, 21–15, 21–8	(gold) Winner
2009	China Open	(South Korea) Jung Jae-sung	(Malaysia) Koo Kien Keat (Malaysia) Tan Boon Heong	21–13, 19–21, 21–18	(gold) Winner
2009	World Superseries Masters Finals	(South Korea) Jung Jae-sung	(Denmark) Mathias Boe (Denmark) Carsten Mogensen	21–15, 21–15	(gold) Winner
2010	Korea Open	(South Korea) Jung Jae-sung	(China) Cai Yun (China) Fu Haifeng	21–11, 14–21, 21–18	(gold) Winner
2010	China Open	(South Korea) Jung Jae-sung	(China) Chai Biao (China) Zhang Nan	21–15, 21–12	(gold) Winner
2010	World Superseries Finals	(South Korea) Jung Jae-sung	(Denmark) Mathias Boe (Denmark) Carsten Mogensen	17–21, 15–21	(silver) Runner-up
2011	Korea Open	(South Korea) Jung Jae-sung	(Denmark) Mathias Boe (Denmark) Carsten Mogensen	21–6, 21–13	(gold) Winner
2011	China Masters	(South Korea) Jung Jae-sung	(China) Cai Yun (China) Fu Haifeng	21–17, 21–10	(gold) Winner
2011	Denmark Open	(South Korea) Jung Jae-sung	(China) Cai Yun (China) Fu Haifeng	21–16, 21–17	(gold) Winner
2011	French Open	(South Korea) Jung Jae-sung	(China) Cai Yun (China) Fu Haifeng	14–21, 21–15, 21–11	(gold) Winner
2011	Hong Kong Open	(South Korea) Jung Jae-sung	(China) Cai Yun (China) Fu Haifeng	21–14, 22–24, 19–21	(silver) Runner-up
2012	Korea Open	(South Korea) Jung Jae-sung	(China) Cai Yun (China) Fu Haifeng	21–18, 17–21, 19–21	(silver) Runner-up
2012	All England Open	(South Korea) Jung Jae-sung	(China) Cai Yun (China) Fu Haifeng	21–23, 21–9, 21–14	(gold) Winner
2012	Indonesia Open	(South Korea) Jung Jae-sung	(Denmark) Mathias Boe (Denmark) Carsten Mogensen	23–21, 19–21, 21–11	(gold) Winner
2012	French Open	(South Korea) Ko Sung-hyun	(Thailand) Bodin Isara (Thailand) Maneepong Jongjit	22–24, 21–17, 21–11	(gold) Winner
2012	China Open	(South Korea) Ko Sung-hyun	(Denmark) Mathias Boe (Denmark) Carsten Mogensen	15–21, 14–21	(silver) Runner-up
2013	Korea Open	(South Korea) Ko Sung-hyun	(Denmark) Mathias Boe (Denmark) Carsten Mogensen	19–21, 21–13, 21–10	(gold) Winner
2013	Malaysia Open	(South Korea) Ko Sung-hyun	(Indonesia) Mohammad Ahsan (Indonesia) Hendra Setiawan	15–21, 13–21	(silver) Runner-up
2013	India Open	(South Korea) Ko Sung-hyun	(China) Liu Xiaolong (China) Qiu Zihan	20–22, 18–21	(silver) Runner-up
2013	Indonesia Open	(South Korea) Ko Sung-hyun	(Indonesia) Mohammad Ahsan (Indonesia) Hendra Setiawan	14–21, 18–21	(silver) Runner-up
2013	Singapore Open	(South Korea) Ko Sung-hyun	(Indonesia) Mohammad Ahsan (Indonesia) Hendra Setiawan	15–21, 18–21	(silver) Runner-up
2013	China Masters	(South Korea) Ko Sung-hyun	(Japan) Hiroyuki Endo (Japan) Kenichi Hayakawa	25–23, 21–19	(gold) Winner
2013	Denmark Open	(South Korea) Yoo Yeon-seong	(Indonesia) Mohammad Ahsan (Indonesia) Hendra Setiawan	21–19, 21–16	(gold) Winner
2013	China Open	(South Korea) Yoo Yeon-seong	(Malaysia) Hoon Thien How (Malaysia) Tan Wee Kiong	21–13, 21–12	(gold) Winner
2013	Hong Kong Open	(South Korea) Yoo Yeon-seong	(South Korea) Kim Gi-jung (South Korea) Kim Sa-rang	12–21, 21–15, 21–18	(gold) Winner
2014	Japan Open	(South Korea) Yoo Yeon-seong	(Indonesia) Mohammad Ahsan (Indonesia) Hendra Setiawan	21–12, 26–24	(gold) Winner
2014	Indonesia Open	(South Korea) Yoo Yeon-seong	(Indonesia) Mohammad Ahsan (Indonesia) Hendra Setiawan	21–15, 21–17	(gold) Winner
2014	Australian Open	(South Korea) Yoo Yeon-seong	(Chinese Taipei) Lee Sheng-mu (Chinese Taipei) Tsai Chia-hsin	21–14, 21–18	(gold) Winner
2014	Denmark Open	(South Korea) Yoo Yeon-seong	(China) Fu Haifeng (China) Zhang Nan	13–21, 23–25	(silver) Runner-up
2014	China Open	(South Korea) Yoo Yeon-seong	(China) Chai Biao (China) Hong Wei	21–14, 21–15	(gold) Winner
2014	Dubai World Superseries Finals	(South Korea) Yoo Yeon-seong	(China) Chai Biao (China) Hong Wei	19–21, 21–19, 21–16	(gold) Winner
2015	Malaysia Open	(South Korea) Yoo Yeon-seong	(Indonesia) Mohammad Ahsan (Indonesia) Hendra Setiawan	21–14, 15–21, 21–23	(silver) Runner-up
2015	Australian Open	(South Korea) Yoo Yeon-seong	(China) Liu Cheng (China) Lu Kai	21–16, 21–17	(gold) Winner
2015	Japan Open	(South Korea) Yoo Yeon-seong	(China) Fu Haifeng (China) Zhang Nan	21–19, 29–27	(gold) Winner
2015	Korea Open	(South Korea) Yoo Yeon-seong	(South Korea) Kim Gi-jung (South Korea) Kim Sa-rang	21–16, 21–12	(gold) Winner
2015	Denmark Open	(South Korea) Yoo Yeon-seong	(China) Liu Cheng (China) Lu Kai	21–8, 21–14	(gold) Winner
2015	French Open	(South Korea) Yoo Yeon-seong	(Denmark) Mads Conrad-Petersen (Denmark) Mads Pieler Kolding	21–14, 21–19	(gold) Winner
2015	Hong Kong Open	(South Korea) Yoo Yeon-seong	(Denmark) Mathias Boe (Denmark) Carsten Mogensen	21–7, 18–21, 21–18	(gold) Winner
2016	Indonesia Open	(South Korea) Yoo Yeon-seong	(China) Chai Biao (China) Hong Wei	13–21, 21–13, 21–16	(gold) Winner
2016	Korea Open	(South Korea) Yoo Yeon-seong	(China) Li Junhui (China) Liu Yuchen	15–21, 22–20, 21–18	(gold) Winner

Mixed doubles
Year	Tournament	Partner	Opponent	Score	Result
2007	Swiss Open	(South Korea) Lee Hyo-jung	(Indonesia) Muhammad Rijal (Indonesia) Greysia Polii	14–21, 21–16, 21–18	(gold) Winner
2008	Malaysia Open	(South Korea) Lee Hyo-jung	(China) He Hanbin (China) Yu Yang	14–21, 15–21	(silver) Runner-up
2008	Korea Open	(South Korea) Lee Hyo-jung	(Indonesia) Flandy Limpele (Indonesia) Vita Marissa	15–21, 21–14, 21–18	(gold) Winner
2008	China Open	(South Korea) Lee Hyo-jung	(China) Xu Chen (China) Zhao Yunlei	21–16, 21–15	(gold) Winner
2008	Hong Kong Open	(South Korea) Lee Hyo-jung	(China) Xie Zhongbo (China) Zhang Yawen	14–21, 16–21	(silver) Runner-up
2009	Malaysia Open	(South Korea) Lee Hyo-jung	(Indonesia) Nova Widianto (Indonesia) Liliyana Natsir	14–21, 19–21	(silver) Runner-up
2009	Korea Open	(South Korea) Lee Hyo-jung	(Thailand) Songphon Anugritayawon (Thailand) Kunchala Voravichitchaikul	21–8, 21–7	(gold) Winner
2009	Swiss Open	(South Korea) Lee Hyo-jung	(China) Zheng Bo (China) Ma Jin	16–21, 15–21	(silver) Runner-up
2009	Indonesia Open	(South Korea) Lee Hyo-jung	(China) Zheng Bo (China) Ma Jin	17–21, 21–8, 16–21	(silver) Runner-up
2009	China Open	(South Korea) Lee Hyo-jung	(China) Zheng Bo (China) Ma Jin	21–18, 15–21, 21–15	(gold) Winner
2010	Swiss Open	(South Korea) Lee Hyo-jung	(South Korea) Shin Baek-cheol (South Korea) Yoo Hyun-young	21–14, 21–18	(gold) Winner
2012	Korea Open	(South Korea) Ha Jung-eun	(China) Xu Chen (China) Ma Jin	12–21, 21–19, 10–21	(silver) Runner-up

BWF Super Series Finals tournament
BWF Super Series Premier tournament
BWF Super Series tournament

=== BWF Grand Prix (16 titles, 11 runners-up) ===
The BWF Grand Prix had two levels, the BWF Grand Prix and Grand Prix Gold. It was a series of badminton tournaments sanctioned by the Badminton World Federation (BWF) which was held from 2007 to 2017. The World Badminton Grand Prix has been sanctioned by the International Badminton Federation from 1983 to 2006.

Men's doubles
Year	Tournament	Partner	Opponent	Score	Result
2006	German Open	(South Korea) Jung Jae-sung	(England) Robert Blair (England) Anthony Clark	15–11, 15–6	(gold) Winner
2006	Chinese Taipei Open	(South Korea) Jung Jae-sung	(China) Cai Yun (China) Fu Haifeng	14–21, 18–21	(silver) Runner-up
2006	Thailand Open	(South Korea) Jung Jae-sung	(South Korea) Hwang Ji-man (South Korea) Lee Jae-jin	Walkover	(gold) Winner
2007	German Open	(South Korea) Jung Jae-sung	(South Korea) Hwang Ji-man (South Korea) Lee Jae-jin	18–21, 20–22	(silver) Runner-up
2007	Thailand Open	(South Korea) Jung Jae-sung	(South Korea) Hwang Ji-man (South Korea) Lee Jae-jin	19–21, 21–19, 9–21	(silver) Runner-up
2008	German Open	(South Korea) Jung Jae-sung	(South Korea) Hwang Ji-man (South Korea) Lee Jae-jin	13–21, 19–21	(silver) Runner-up
2009	German Open	(South Korea) Shin Baek-cheol	(Japan) Kenichi Hayakawa (Japan) Kenta Kazuno	21–13, 21–16	(gold) Winner
2010	Chinese Taipei Open	(South Korea) Jung Jae-sung	(South Korea) Cho Gun-woo (South Korea) Kwon Yi-goo	21–10, 21–16	(gold) Winner
2010	Korea Grand Prix	(South Korea) Jung Jae-sung	(South Korea) Ko Sung-hyun (South Korea) Yoo Yeon-seong	18–21, 21–18, 27–27	(gold) Winner
2011	German Open	(South Korea) Jung Jae-sung	(South Korea) Kim Gi-jung (South Korea) Kim Sa-rang	21–19, 18–21, 21–11	(gold) Winner
2011	Swiss Open	(South Korea) Jung Jae-sung	(South Korea) Ko Sung-hyun (South Korea) Yoo Yeon-seong	17–21, 16–21	(silver) Runner-up
2011	Thailand Open	(South Korea) Jung Jae-sung	(Indonesia) Hendra Aprida Gunawan (Indonesia) Alvent Yulianto	24–22, 21–14	(gold) Winner
2011	U.S. Open	(South Korea) Ko Sung-hyun	(United States) Howard Bach (United States) Tony Gunawan	21–9, 21–19	(gold) Winner
2011	Canada Open	(South Korea) Ko Sung-hyun	(China) Liu Xiaolong (China) Qiu Zihan	21–18, 21–16	(gold) Winner
2011	Chinese Taipei Open	(South Korea) Jung Jae-sung	(South Korea) Ko Sung-hyun (South Korea) Yoo Yeon-seong	21–23, 17–21	(silver) Runner-up
2011	Korea Grand Prix Gold	(South Korea) Jung Jae-sung	(South Korea) Ko Sung-hyun (South Korea) Yoo Yeon-seong	15–21, 22–24	(silver) Runner-up
2012	German Open	(South Korea) Jung Jae-sung	(China) Hong Wei (China) Shen Ye	19–21, 21–18, 19–21	(silver) Runner-up
2012	Korea Grand Prix Gold	(South Korea) Ko Sung-hyun	(South Korea) Kim Gi-jung (South Korea) Kim Sa-rang	21–12, 21–11	(gold) Winner
2012	India Grand Prix Gold	(South Korea) Ko Sung-hyun	(South Korea) Kang Ji-wook (South Korea) Lee Sang-joon	21–13, 21–19	(gold) Winner
2013	Swiss Open	(South Korea) Ko Sung-hyun	(China) Chai Biao (China) Hong Wei	14–21, 21–18, 14–21	(silver) Runner-up
2014	Korea Grand Prix	(South Korea) Yoo Yeon-seong	(South Korea) Ko Sung-hyun (South Korea) Shin Baek-cheol	21–18, 21–19	(gold) Winner
2016	German Open	(South Korea) Yoo Yeon-seong	(South Korea) Ko Sung-hyun (South Korea) Shin Baek-cheol	22–20, 18–21, 17–21	(silver) Runner-up
2016	China Masters	(South Korea) Yoo Yeon-seong	(South Korea) Kim Gi-jung (South Korea) Kim Sa-rang	21–17, 21–14	(gold) Winner

Mixed doubles
Year	Tournament	Partner	Opponent	Score	Result
2006	Thailand Open	(South Korea) Hwang Yu-mi	(Thailand) Sudket Prapakamol (Thailand) Saralee Thungthongkam	21–11, 18–21, 22–20	(gold) Winner
2008	German Open	(South Korea) Lee Hyo-jung	(China) He Hanbin (China) Yu Yang	9–21, 27–25, 21–18	(gold) Winner
2011	U.S. Open	(South Korea) Ha Jung-eun	(Chinese Taipei) Chen Hung-ling (Chinese Taipei) Cheng Wen-hsing	21–19, 21–13	(gold) Winner
2012	German Open	(South Korea) Ha Jung-eun	(Denmark) Thomas Laybourn (Denmark) Kamilla Rytter Juhl	19–21, 16–21	(silver) Runner-up

BWF Grand Prix Gold tournament
BWF Grand Prix tournament

=== BWF International Challenge/Series/Satellite (6 titles, 2 runners-up) ===
Men's doubles
Year	Tournament	Partner	Opponent	Score	Result
2005	Cheers Asian Satellite	(South Korea) Cho Gun-woo	(Malaysia) Hong Chieng Hun (Malaysia) Ng Kean Kok	15–13, 6–15, 3–15	(silver) Runner-up
2005	Mongolian Satellite	(South Korea) Han Sang-hoon	(China) Wang Wei (China) Zhang Lei	15–3, 15–12	(gold) Winner
2008	Korea International	(South Korea) Jung Jae-sung	(South Korea) Cho Gun-woo (South Korea) Yoo Yeon-seong	21–16, 26–24	(gold) Winner
2009	Korea International	(South Korea) Jung Jae-sung	(South Korea) Ko Sung-hyun (South Korea) Yoo Yeon-seong	21–19, 15–21, 21–15	(gold) Winner
2012	India International	(South Korea) Ko Sung-hyun	(South Korea) Cho Gun-woo (South Korea) Kim Dae-eun	21–11, 21–10	(gold) Winner

Mixed doubles
Year	Tournament	Partner	Opponent	Score	Result
2005	Cheers Asian Satellite	(South Korea) Ha Jung-eun	(Singapore) Hendri Kurniawan Saputra (Singapore) Li Yujia	6–15, 8–15	(silver) Runner-up
2005	Mongolian Satellite	(South Korea) Ha Jung-eun	(China) Wang Wei (China) Tao Xiaolan	15–7, 15–11	(gold) Winner
2009	Korea International	(South Korea) Lee Hyo-jung	(South Korea) Ko Sung-hyun (South Korea) Ha Jung-eun	21–14, 15–21, 21–9	(gold) Winner

BWF International Challenge tournament
BWF International Series tournament

== Filmography ==
=== Television series ===
Year	Title	Role	Notes	Ref.
2021	Racket Boys	Lee Yong-dae	Cameo (Episode 15)	

=== Television Show ===
Year	Title	Role	Notes	Ref.
2018	Law of the Jungle in Last Indian Ocean	Cast Member	Episode 340–343	
2020–2021	Let's Play Soccer	Cast Member	Episode 66–82	
2021	Racket Boys	Main Cast		
2022	legendfestival	Participant		
