= Yoo Yeon-seong =

South Korean badminton player (born 1986)

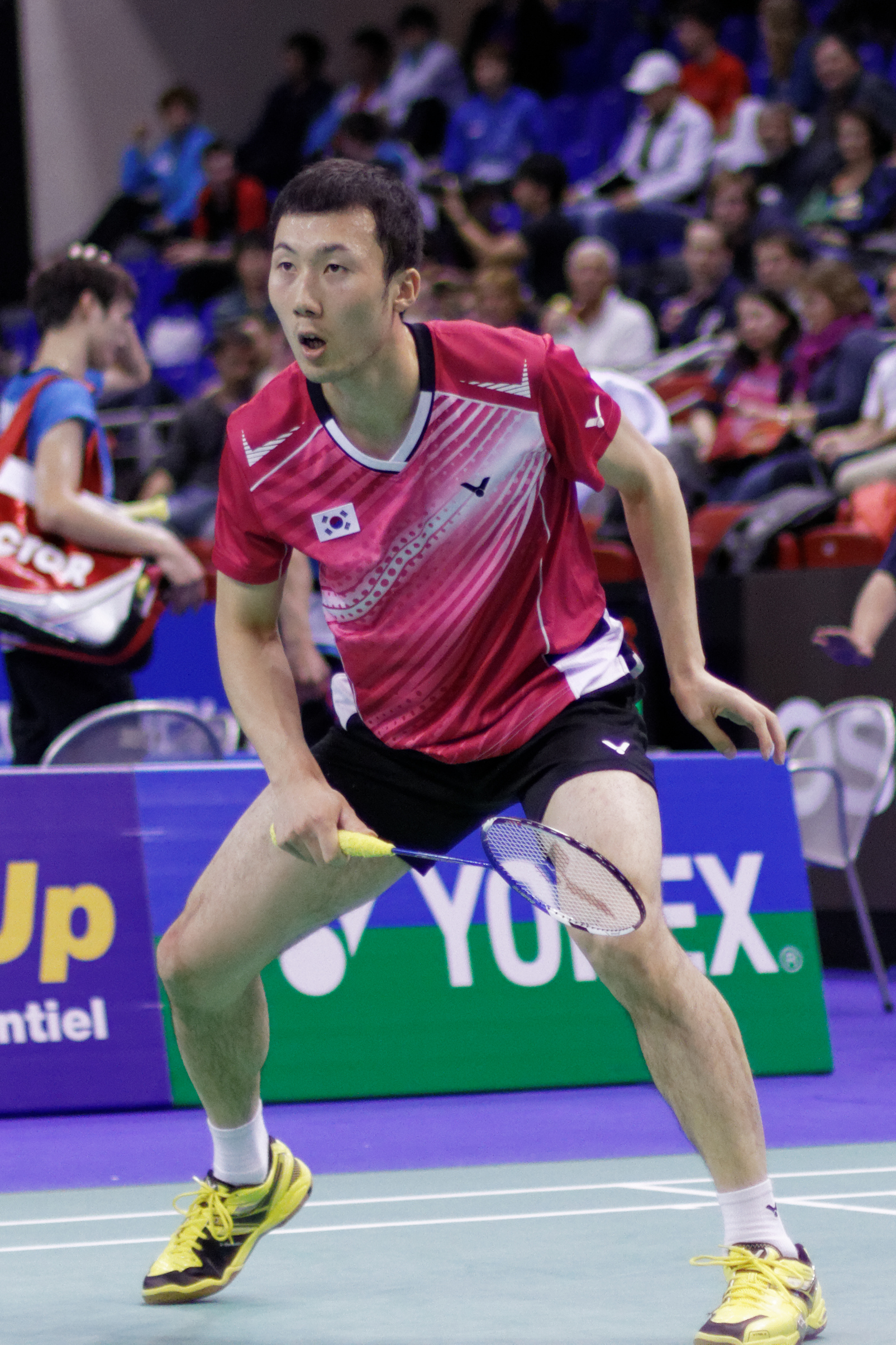
- Yoo Yeon-seong at the 2013 French Super Series.

Personal information
- Born: 19 August 1986 (age 40) Jeongeup, Jeonbuk, South Korea
- Height: 1.80 m (5 ft 11 in)
- Weight: 68 kg (150 lb)

Sport
- Country: South Korea
- Sport: Badminton
- Handedness: Right

Men's & mixed doubles
- Highest ranking: 1 (MD with Lee Yong-dae 14 August 2014); 11 (XD with Kim Min-jung)
- BWF profile
Medal record
Men's badminton
Representing South Korea
World Championships
Silver medal – second place	2011 London	Men's doubles
Silver medal – second place	2014 Copenhagen	Men's doubles
Bronze medal – third place	2015 Jakarta	Men's doubles
Sudirman Cup
Silver medal – second place	2009 Guangzhou	Mixed team
Bronze medal – third place	2011 Qingdao	Mixed team
Bronze medal – third place	2015 Dongguan	Mixed team
Thomas Cup
Silver medal – second place	2012 Wuhan	Men's team
Bronze medal – third place	2016 Kunshan	Men's team
Asian Games
Gold medal – first place	2014 Incheon	Men's team
Silver medal – second place	2010 Guangzhou	Men's team
Silver medal – second place	2014 Incheon	Men's doubles
Asia Championships
Gold medal – first place	2010 New Delhi	Men's doubles
Gold medal – first place	2014 Gimcheon	Men's doubles
Gold medal – first place	2015 Wuhan	Men's doubles
Gold medal – first place	2016 Wuhan	Men's doubles
Silver medal – second place	2009 Suwon	Men's doubles
Silver medal – second place	2009 Suwon	Mixed doubles
Silver medal – second place	2010 New Delhi	Mixed doubles
Asia Mixed Team Championships
Silver medal – second place	2017 Ho Chi Minh	Mixed team
Asia Team Championships
Bronze medal – third place	2016 Hyderabad	Men's team
Summer Universiade
Gold medal – first place	2007 Bangkok	Mixed doubles
World Junior Championships
Silver medal – second place	2004 Richmond	Mixed team
Bronze medal – third place	2004 Richmond	Boys' doubles
Asian Junior Championships
Silver medal – second place	2004 Hwacheon	Boys' doubles
Silver medal – second place	2004 Hwacheon	Mixed doubles
Silver medal – second place	2004 Hwacheon	Boys' team

- Yoo Yeon-seong
- Hangul: 유연성
- Hanja: 柳延星
- RR: Yu Yeonseong
- MR: Yu Yŏnsŏng

Yoo Yeon-seong (Korean pronunciation: [ju.jʌn.sʌŋ]; born 19 August 1986) is a South Korean professional badminton player.

He specializes in doubles events and was formerly ranked No. 1 worldwide with his former partner, Lee Yong Dae for 117 consecutive weeks between 2014 and 2016. The two also competed at the 2012 Summer Olympics. For a long time he played mixed doubles with Kim Min-jung, but later switched partners to play with Chang Ye-na, starting in 2011. Starting in late 2013, his men's doubles partner was Lee Yong-dae. Together, they reached a world ranking of No.1 in August 2014.

Yoo was among 4 players reported to be retiring and hanging up his national team jersey after the Rio Olympics but during the Korea Open that September, it was revealed that he would be continuing to play on the national team after his partner Lee Yong-dae retired. Yoo said that he wants to spend more time with his family. After he and Lee won the Korea Open title, Yoo played an additional 9 international ranking events but his name was finally removed from the Korean national team list a few weeks after the 2017 Singapore Open.

== Achievements ==
=== BWF World Championships ===
Men's doubles
Year	Venue	Partner	Opponent	Score	Result
2011	Wembley Arena, London, England	(South Korea) Ko Sung-hyun	(China) Cai Yun (China) Fu Haifeng	22–24, 16–21	Silver
2014	Ballerup Super Arena, Copenhagen, Denmark	(South Korea) Lee Yong-dae	(South Korea) Ko Sung-hyun (South Korea) Shin Baek-cheol	20–22, 23–21, 18–21	Silver
2015	Istora Senayan, Jakarta, Indonesia	(South Korea) Lee Yong-dae	(Indonesia) Mohammad Ahsan (Indonesia) Hendra Setiawan	17–21, 19–21	Bronze

=== Asian Games ===
Men's doubles
Year	Venue	Partner	Opponent	Score	Result
2014	Gyeyang Gymnasium, Incheon, South Korea	(South Korea) Lee Yong-dae	(Indonesia) Mohammad Ahsan (Indonesia) Hendra Setiawan	16–21, 21–16, 17–21	Silver

=== Asia Championships ===
Men's doubles
Year	Venue	Partner	Opponent	Score	Result
2009	Suwon Indoor Stadium; Suwon, South Korea	(South Korea) Ko Sung-hyun	(Indonesia) Markis Kido (Indonesia) Hendra Setiawan	18–21, 24–26	Silver
2010	Siri Fort Indoor Stadium; New Delhi, India	(South Korea) Cho Gun-woo	(Chinese Taipei) Chen Hung-ling (Chinese Taipei) Lin Yu-lang	21–19, 12–21, 21–17	Gold
2014	Gimcheon Indoor Stadium; Gimcheon, South Korea	(South Korea) Shin Baek-choel	(China) Li Junhui (China) Liu Yuchen	22–20, 21–17	Gold
2015	Wuhan Sports Center Gymnasium; Wuhan, China	(South Korea) Lee Yong-dae	(Indonesia) Mohammad Ahsan (Indonesia) Hendra Setiawan	18–21, 24–22, 21–19	Gold
2016	Wuhan Sports Center Gymnasium; Wuhan, China	(South Korea) Lee Yong-dae	(China) Li Junhui (China) Liu Yuchen	21–14, 28–26	Gold

Mixed doubles
Year	Venue	Partner	Opponent	Score	Result
2009	Suwon Indoor Stadium; Suwon, South Korea	(South Korea) Kim Min-jung	(South Korea) Lee Yong-dae (South Korea) Lee Hyo-jung	12–21, 15–21	Silver
2010	Siri Fort Indoor Stadium; New Delhi, India	(South Korea) Kim Min-jung	(Malaysia) Chan Peng Soon (Malaysia) Goh Liu Ying	17–21, 22–20, 19–21	Silver

=== Summer Universiade ===
Mixed doubles
Year	Venue	Partner	Opponent	Score	Result
2007	Thammasat University; Pathum Thani, Thailand	(South Korea) Kim Min-jung	(Chinese Taipei) Fang Chieh-min (Chinese Taipei) Cheng Wen-hsing	21–19, 13–21, 21–17	Gold

=== World Junior Championships ===
Boys' doubles
Year	Venue	Partner	Opponent	Score	Result
2004	Minoru Arena; Richmond, Canada	(South Korea) Jeon Jun-bum	(Malaysia) Hoon Thien How (Malaysia) Tan Boon Heong	10–15, 14–17	Bronze

=== Asian Junior Championships ===
Boys' doubles
Year	Venue	Partner	Opponent	Score	Result
2004	Hwacheon Indoor Stadium; Hwacheon, South Korea	(South Korea) Jeon Jun-bum	(South Korea) Jung Jung-young (South Korea) Lee Yong-dae	11–15, 3–15	Silver

Mixed doubles
Year	Venue	Partner	Opponent	Score	Result
2004	Hwacheon Indoor Stadium; Hwacheon, South Korea	(South Korea) Ha Jung-eun	(China) Shen Ye (China) Feng Chen	11–15, 6–15	Silver

=== BWF Superseries (19 titles, 10 runners-up) ===
The BWF Superseries, launched on 14 December 2006 and implemented in 2007, is a series of elite badminton tournaments, sanctioned by Badminton World Federation (BWF). BWF Superseries has two level such as Superseries and Superseries Premier. A season of Superseries features twelve tournaments around the world, which introduced since 2011, with successful players invited to the Superseries Finals held at the year end.

Men's doubles
Year	Tournament	Partner	Opponent	Score	Result
2010	Swiss Open	(South Korea) Ko Sung-hyun	(Malaysia) Koo Kean Keat (Malaysia) Tan Boon Heong	21–18, 21–16	(gold) Winner
2010	China Masters	(South Korea) Ko Sung-hyun	(China) Cai Yun (China) Fu Haifeng	14–21, 19–21	(silver) Runner-up
2010	Hong Kong Open	(South Korea) Ko Sung-hyun	(Indonesia) Markis Kido (Indonesia) Hendra Setiawan	21–19, 14–21, 23–21	(gold) Winner
2011	China Open	(South Korea) Ko Sung-hyun	(Denmark) Mathias Boe (Denmark) Carsten Mogensen	17–21, 13–21	(silver) Runner-up
2012	India Open	(South Korea) Ko Sung-hyun	(Thailand) Bodin Isara (Thailand) Maneepong Jongjit	17–21, 21–14, 14–21	(silver) Runner-up
2012	Singapore Open	(South Korea) Ko Sung-hyun	(Indonesia) Markis Kido (Indonesia) Hendra Setiawan	20–22, 21–11, 6–21	(silver) Runner-up
2012	Denmark Open	(South Korea) Shin Baek-choel	(Malaysia) Koo Kien Keat (Malaysia) Tan Boon Heong	19–21, 21–11, 21–19	(gold) Winner
2013	Denmark Open	(South Korea) Lee Yong-dae	(Indonesia) Mohammad Ahsan (Indonesia) Hendra Setiawan	21–19, 21–16	(gold) Winner
2013	China Open	(South Korea) Lee Yong-dae	(Malaysia) Hoon Thien How (Malaysia) Tan Wee Kiong	21–13, 21–12	(gold) Winner
2013	Hong Kong Open	(South Korea) Lee Yong-dae	(South Korea) Kim Gi-jung (South Korea) Kim Sa-rang	12–21, 21–15, 21–18	(gold) Winner
2014	Japan Open	(South Korea) Lee Yong-dae	(Indonesia) Mohammad Ahsan (Indonesia) Hendra Setiawan	21–12, 26–24	(gold) Winner
2014	Indonesia Open	(South Korea) Lee Yong-dae	(Indonesia) Mohammad Ahsan (Indonesia) Hendra Setiawan	21–15, 21–17	(gold) Winner
2014	Australian Open	(South Korea) Lee Yong-dae	(Chinese Taipei) Lee Sheng-mu (Chinese Taipei) Tsai Chia-hsin	21–14, 21–18	(gold) Winner
2014	Denmark Open	(South Korea) Lee Yong-dae	(China) Fu Haifeng (China) Zhang Nan	13–21, 23–25	(silver) Runner-up
2014	China Open	(South Korea) Lee Yong-dae	(China) Chai Biao (China) Hong Wei	21–14, 21–15	(gold) Winner
2014	Dubai World Superseries Finals	(South Korea) Lee Yong-dae	(China) Chai Biao (China) Hong Wei	19–21, 21–19, 21–16	(gold) Winner
2015	Malaysia Open	(South Korea) Lee Yong-dae	(Indonesia) Mohammad Ahsan (Indonesia) Hendra Setiawan	21–14, 15–21, 21–23	(silver) Runner-up
2015	Australian Open	(South Korea) Lee Yong-dae	(China) Liu Cheng (China) Lu Kai	21–16, 21–17	(gold) Winner
2015	Japan Open	(South Korea) Lee Yong-dae	(China) Fu Haifeng (China) Zhang Nan	21–19, 29–27	(gold) Winner
2015	Korea Open	(South Korea) Lee Yong-dae	(South Korea) Kim Gi-jung (South Korea) Kim Sa-rang	21–16, 21–12	(gold) Winner
2015	Denmark Open	(South Korea) Lee Yong-dae	(China) Liu Cheng (China) Lu Kai	21–8, 21–14	(gold) Winner
2015	French Open	(South Korea) Lee Yong-dae	(Denmark) Mads Conrad-Petersen (Denmark) Mads Pieler Kolding	21–14, 21–19	(gold) Winner
2015	Hong Kong Open	(South Korea) Lee Yong-dae	(Denmark) Mathias Boe (Denmark) Carsten Mogensen	21–7, 18–21, 21–18	(gold) Winner
2016	Indonesia Open	(South Korea) Lee Yong-dae	(China) Chai Biao (China) Hong Wei	13–21, 21–13, 21–16	(gold) Winner
2016	Korea Open	(South Korea) Lee Yong-dae	(China) Li Junhui (China) Liu Yuchen	15–21, 22–20, 21–18	(gold) Winner

Mixed doubles
Year	Tournament	Partner	Opponent	Score	Result
2011	China Masters	(South Korea) Jang Ye-na	(China) Xu Chen (China) Ma Jin	13–21, 16–21	(silver) Runner-up
2013	Singapore Open	(South Korea) Eom Hye-won	(Indonesia) Tontowi Ahmad (Indonesia) Liliyana Natsir	12–21, 12–21	(silver) Runner-up
2013	China Masters	(South Korea) Eom Hye-won	(China) Zhang Nan (China) Zhao Yunlei	18–21, 12–21	(silver) Runner-up
2014	China Open	(South Korea) Eom Hye-won	(China) Zhang Nan (China) Zhao Yunlei	25–23, 14–21, 18–21	(silver) Runner-up

BWF Super Series Finals tournament
BWF Super Series Premier tournament
BWF Super Series tournament

=== BWF Grand Prix (12 titles, 5 runners-up) ===
The BWF Grand Prix has two levels, the BWF Grand Prix and Grand Prix Gold. It is a series of badminton tournaments sanctioned by the Badminton World Federation (BWF) since 2007. The World Badminton Grand Prix sanctioned by International Badminton Federation (IBF) since 1983.

Men's doubles
Year	Tournament	Partner	Opponent	Score	Result
2006	Vietnam Open	(South Korea) Jeon Jun-bum	(Malaysia) Chew Choon Eng (Malaysia) Hong Chieng Hun	21–19, 21–19	(gold) Winner
2010	Macau Open	(South Korea) Ko Sung-hyun	(Indonesia) Hendra Aprida Gunawan (Indonesia) Alvent Yulianto	21–17, 21–15	(gold) Winner
2010	Korea Grand Prix	(South Korea) Ko Sung-hyun	(South Korea) Jung Jae-sung (South Korea) Lee Yong-dae	21–18, 18–21, 25–27	(silver) Runner-up
2011	Swiss Open	(South Korea) Ko Sung-hyun	(South Korea) Jung Jae-sung (South Korea) Lee Yong-dae	21–17, 21–16	(gold) Winner
2011	Chinese Taipei Open	(South Korea) Ko Sung-hyun	(South Korea) Jung Jae-sung (South Korea) Lee Yong-dae	23–21, 21–17	(gold) Winner
2011	Macau Open	(South Korea) Ko Sung-hyun	(China) Chai Biao (China) Guo Zhendong	19–21, 19–21	(silver) Runner-up
2011	Korea Grand Prix Gold	(South Korea) Ko Sung-hyun	(South Korea) Jung Jae-sung (South Korea) Lee Yong-dae	21–15, 24–22	(gold) Winner
2013	Thailand Open	(South Korea) Shin Baek-cheol	(Russia) Vladimir Ivanov (Russia) Ivan Sozonov	18–21, 21–15, 21–14	(gold) Winner
2014	Korea Grand Prix	(South Korea) Lee Yong-dae	(South Korea) Ko Sung-hyun (South Korea) Shin Baek-cheol	21–18, 21–19	(gold) Winner
2016	German Open	(South Korea) Lee Yong-dae	(South Korea) Ko Sung-hyun (South Korea) Shin Baek-cheol	22–20, 18–21, 17–21	(silver) Runner-up
2016	China Masters	(South Korea) Lee Yong-dae	(South Korea) Kim Gi-jung (South Korea) Kim Sa-rang	21–17, 21–14	(gold) Winner

Mixed doubles
Year	Tournament	Partner	Opponent	Score	Result
2006	Vietnam Open	(South Korea) Lee Jung-mi	(South Korea) Kang Myeong-won (South Korea) Kang Joo-young	21–17, 17–21, 21–18	(gold) Winner
2010	Korea Grand Prix	(South Korea) Kim Min-jung	(South Korea) Choi Young-woo (South Korea) Eom Hye-won	21–15, 21–13	(gold) Winner
2011	Korea Grand Prix Gold	(South Korea) Jang Ye-na	(South Korea) Kim Ki-jung (South Korea) Jung Kyung-eun	21–17, 21–19	(gold) Winner
2012	Korea Grand Prix Gold	(South Korea) Jang Ye-na	(South Korea) Shin Baek-cheol (South Korea) Eom Hye-won	21–11, 18–21, 23–25	(silver) Runner-up
2013	Chinese Taipei Open	(South Korea) Eom Hye-won	(South Korea) Shin Baek-cheol (South Korea) Jang Ye-na	20–22, 21–12, 16–21	(silver) Runner-up
2013	Korea Grand Prix Gold	(South Korea) Jang Ye-na	(South Korea) Kang Ji-wook (South Korea) Choi Hye-in	21–13, 21–11	(gold) Winner

BWF Grand Prix Gold tournament
BWF Grand Prix tournament

=== BWF International Challenge/Series (4 titles, 6 runners-up) ===
Men's doubles
Year	Tournament	Partner	Opponent	Score	Result
2003	Hungarian International	(South Korea) Jeon Jun-bum	(South Korea) Hwang Ji-man (South Korea) Lee Jae-jin	12–15, 12–15	(silver) Runner-up
2006	Mongolian Satellite	(South Korea) Jeon Jun-bum	(South Korea) Kim Ki-jung (South Korea) Lee Jung-hwan	21–14, 21–14	(gold) Winner
2007	Vietnam International	(South Korea) Cho Gun-woo	(Indonesia) Mohammad Ahsan (Indonesia) Bona Septano	15–21, 19–21	(silver) Runner-up
2008	Korea International	(South Korea) Cho Gun-woo	(South Korea) Jung Jae-sung (South Korea) Lee Yong-dae	16–21, 24–26	(silver) Runner-up
2009	Korea International	(South Korea) Ko Sung-hyun	(South Korea) Jung Jae-sung (South Korea) Lee Yong-dae	19–21, 21–15, 15–21	(silver) Runner-up
2018	Dubai International	(South Korea) Kim Sang-soo	(Malaysia) Lim Khim Wah (India) Tarun Kona	21–16, 21–9	(gold) Winner

Mixed doubles
Year	Tournament	Partner	Opponent	Score	Result
2006	Mongolian Satellite	(South Korea) Kim Min-jung	(South Korea) Lee Jung-hwan (South Korea) Yoo Hyun-young	21–13, 21–15	(gold) Winner
2007	Cheers Asian Satellite	(South Korea) Ha Jung-eun	(South Korea) Cho Gun-woo (South Korea) Kim Min-jung	19–21, 15–21	(silver) Runner-up
2007	Indonesia International	(South Korea) Kim Min-jung	(Indonesia) Tontowi Ahmad (Indonesia) Yulianti CJ	16–21, 21–15, 9–21	(silver) Runner-up
2018	Dubai International	(South Korea) Park So-young	(Russia) Denis Grachev (Russia) Ekaterina Bolotova	21–14, 17–21, 21–14	(gold) Winner

BWF International Challenge tournament
BWF International Series tournament

== Record against selected opponents ==
Men's doubles results with Ko Sung-hyun against Super Series finalists, World Championships semifinalists, and Olympic quarterfinalists.

- (China) Cai Yun & Fu Haifeng 1–7
- (China) Chai Biao & Guo Zhendong 1-2
- (China) Guo Zhendong & Xu Chen 2–0
- (Chinese Taipei) Fang Chieh-min & Lee Sheng-mu 3–1
- (Denmark) Mathias Boe & Carsten Mogensen 0–6
- (Denmark) Lars Påske & Jonas Rasmussen 1–1
- (Denmark) Jonas Rasmussen & Mads Conrad-Petersen 1–0
- (Indonesia) Mohammad Ahsan & Bona Septano 5–1
- (Indonesia) Alvent Yulianto Chandra & Hendra Aprida Gunawan 4–1
- (Indonesia) Markis Kido & Hendra Setiawan 2–3
- (Japan) Hirokatsu Hashimoto & Noriyasu Hirata 4–2
- (South Korea) Jung Jae-sung & Lee Yong-dae 4–4
- (South Korea) Cho Gun-woo & Shin Baek-cheol 1–0
- (Malaysia) Choong Tan Fook & Lee Wan Wah 1–0
- (Malaysia) Koo Kien Keat & Tan Boon Heong 6–1
- (Poland) Adam Cwalina & Michał Łogosz 1–0
- (Thailand) Bodin Isara & Maneepong Jongjit 0–3
- (United States) Howard Bach & Tony Gunawan 3–1
