= Hoon Thien How =

Malaysian badminton player

Hoon Thien How 云天豪
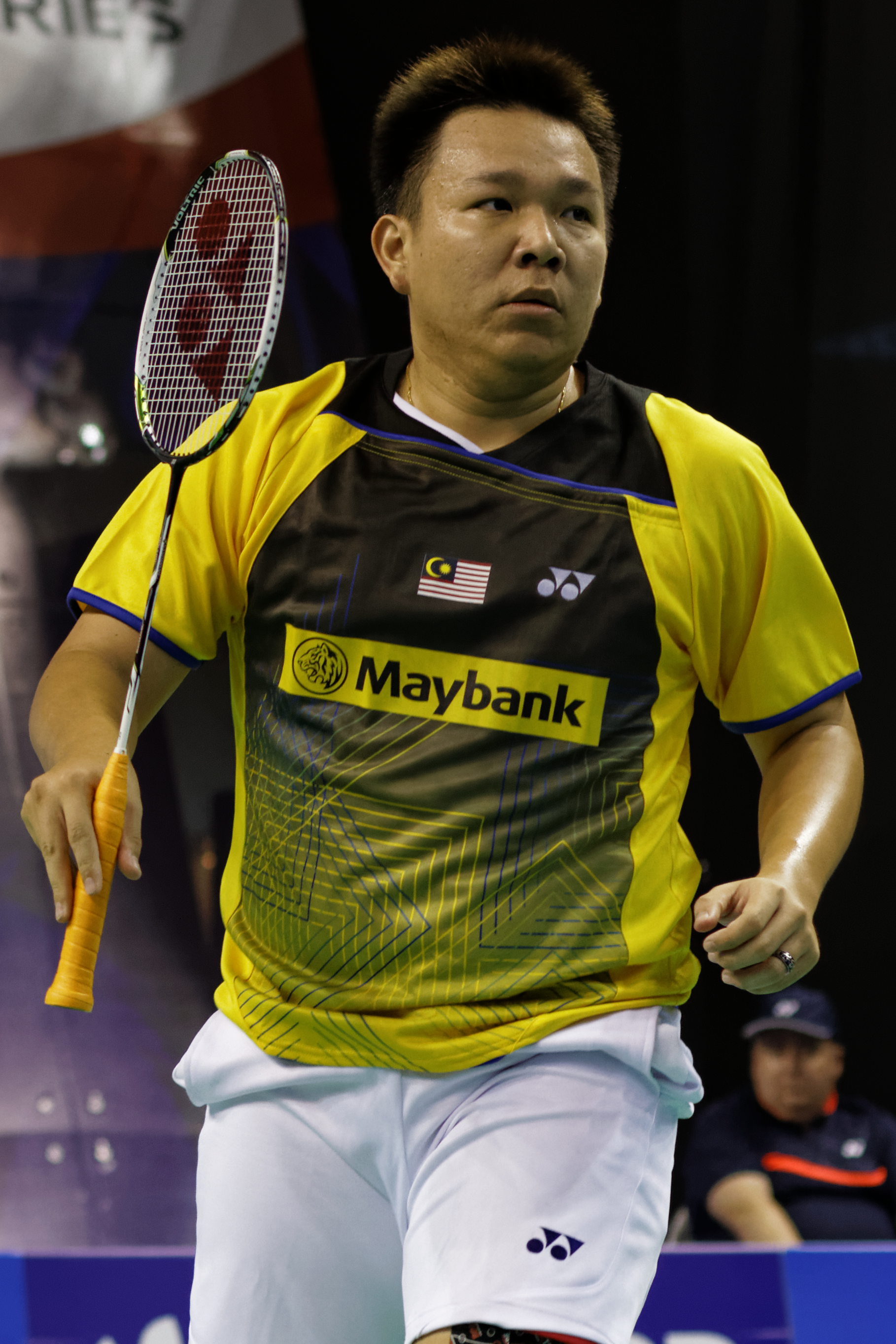

Personal information
- Born: 24 December 1986 (age 39) Kuala Lumpur, Malaysia
- Years active: 2004-2017
- Height: 1.72 m (5 ft 8 in)

Sport
- Country: Malaysia
- Sport: Badminton
- Handedness: Right

Men's doubles
- Highest ranking: 7 (14 March 2013)
- BWF profile
Medal record
Men's badminton
Representing Malaysia
Thomas Cup
Silver medal – second place	2014 New Delhi	Men's team
Bronze medal – third place	2010 Kuala Lumpur	Men's team
Asian Games
Bronze medal – third place	2014 Incheon	Men's team
Asian Championships
Silver medal – second place	2006 Johor Bahru	Men's doubles
World Junior Championships
Gold medal – first place	2004 Richmond	Boys' doubles
Commonwealth Youth Games
Gold medal – first place	2004 Bendigo	Mixed team
Asian Junior Championships
Bronze medal – third place	2004 Hwacheon	Boys' team

Hoon Thien How
- Chinese: 雲天豪
Transcriptions
Yue: Cantonese
- Jyutping: Wan4 Tin1 Hou4
Southern Min
- Hokkien POJ: Hûn Thian-hô

Hoon Thien How (born 24 December 1986) is a Malaysian former badminton player who played in the men's doubles category. Currently, he is one of the assistant coaches for Malaysia men's doubles national team.

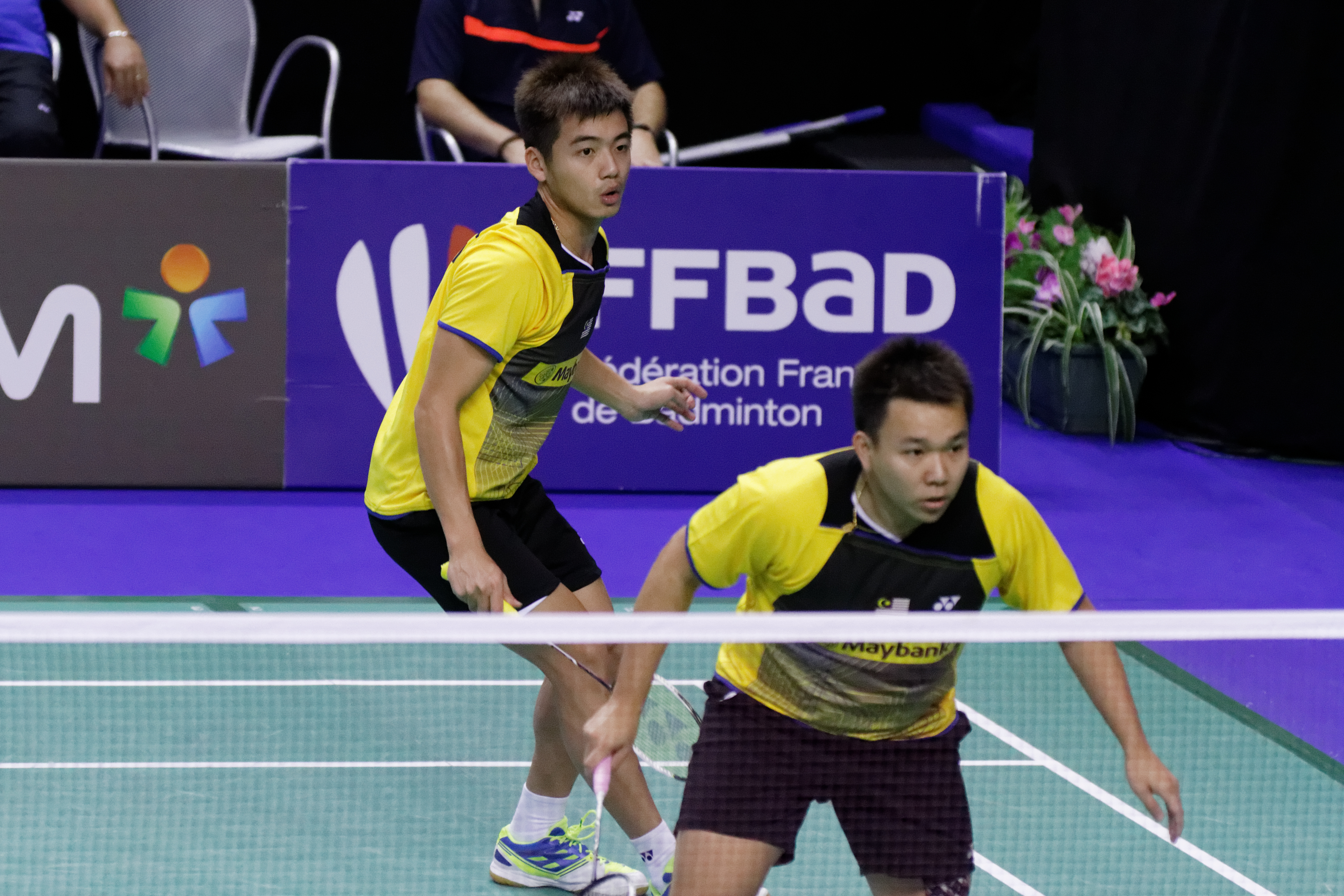
Hoon with his partner Tan Wee Kiong

== Career ==
Hoon Thien How and Tan Boon Heong were the World Junior Champions in 2004. Their partnership continued until early 2006 when they won the silver medal at the 2006 Asian Badminton Championships. Shortly after, Tan was partnered with Koo Kien Keat and Hoon was briefly partnered with Chan Chong Ming and then, Ong Soon Hock.

Hoon and Ong participated in the 2008 Indonesia Open and reached the semi-finals before being beaten by Candra Wijaya and Tony Gunawan, 25–23, 15–21, 15–21. This was followed by a defeat to second-seeded Cai Yun/Fu Haifeng in the 2008 China Masters 15–21, 21–17, and 20–22.

In 2010, Hoon and Ong were chosen to play for Malaysia Thomas Cup squad. From 2010 onward, he was paired with Tan Wee Kiong. Hoon and Tan broke into the top 10 in the world rankings on 20 December 2012. Together, their highest ranking was at No. 7. Hoon and Tan did not win any Super Series tournaments during their partnership. However, they often made it to the quarterfinals, semifinals or finals of the tournaments which contributed to their world ranking.

In May 2014, Hoon represented Malaysia at 2014 Thomas Cup with former partner, Tan Boon Heong as a scratch pair. They played first doubles and defeated World No. 1 pair, Mohammad Ahsan and Hendra Setiawan of Indonesia in the semi-finals but failed to defeat world No. 3 pair, Hiroyuki Endo and Kenichi Hayakawa of Japan in the finals. Malaysia lost narrowly 2–3 to Japan.

After 8 years since they last played together as official partners, Hoon's partnership with Tan Boon Heong was permanently resumed in September 2014. This was due to the resignation of Boon Heong's partner, Koo Kien Keat earlier that year along with Tan Wee Kiong's new partnership with Goh V Shem.

== Achievements ==
=== Asian Championships ===
Men's doubles
Year	Venue	Partner	Opponent	Score	Result
2006	Bandaraya Stadium, Johor Bahru, Malaysia	(Malaysia) Tan Boon Heong	(Malaysia) Choong Tan Fook (Malaysia) Lee Wan Wah	21–17, 11–21, 12–21	Silver

=== World Junior Championships ===
Boys' doubles
Year	Venue	Partner	Opponent	Score	Result
2004	Minoru Arena, Richmond, Canada	(Malaysia) Tan Boon Heong	(South Korea) Jung Jung-young (South Korea) Lee Yong-dae	15–6, 3–15, 15–12	Gold

=== BWF Superseries ===
The BWF Superseries, which was launched on 14 December 2006 and implemented in 2007, was a series of elite badminton tournaments, sanctioned by the Badminton World Federation (BWF). BWF Superseries levels were Superseries and Superseries Premier. A season of Superseries consisted of twelve tournaments around the world that had been introduced since 2011. Successful players were invited to the Superseries Finals, which were held at the end of each year.

Men's doubles
Year	Tournament	Partner	Opponent	Score	Result
2013	China Open	(Malaysia) Tan Wee Kiong	(South Korea) Lee Yong-dae (South Korea) Yoo Yeon-seong	13–21, 12–21	(silver) Runner-up

BWF Super Series Finals tournament
BWF Super Series Premier tournament
BWF Super Series tournament

=== BWF Grand Prix ===
The BWF Grand Prix had two levels, the Grand Prix and Grand Prix Gold. It was a series of badminton tournaments sanctioned by the Badminton World Federation (BWF) and played between 2007 and 2017.

Men's doubles
Year	Tournament	Partner	Opponent	Score	Result
2007	New Zealand Open	(Malaysia) Chan Chong Ming	(Hong Kong) Albert Susanto Njoto (Hong Kong) Yohan Hadikusuma Wiratama	21–14, 20–22, 21–11	(gold) Winner
2009	Vietnam Open	(Malaysia) Ong Soon Hock	(Indonesia) Luluk Hadiyanto (Indonesia) Joko Riyadi	19–21, 20–22	(silver) Runner-up
2013	Macau Open	(Malaysia) Tan Wee Kiong	(Chinese Taipei) Lee Sheng-mu (Chinese Taipei) Tsai Chia-hsin	21–16, 21–19	(gold) Winner
2015	Chinese Taipei Masters	(Malaysia) Lim Khim Wah	(Indonesia) Marcus Fernaldi Gideon (Indonesia) Kevin Sanjaya Sukamuljo	12–21, 8–21	(silver) Runner-up

BWF Grand Prix Gold tournament
BWF Grand Prix tournament
