= Jung Jung-young =

South Korean badminton player (born 1986)

Personal information
- Born: 20 October 1986 (age 40)
- Height: 1.70 m (5 ft 7 in)
- Weight: 73 kg (161 lb)

Sport
- Country: South Korea
- Sport: Badminton
- Handedness: Right
- Event: Men's & mixed doubles

Men's & mixed doubles
- BWF profile
Medal record
Men's badminton
Representing South Korea
World Junior Championships
| Silver medal – second place | 2004 Richmond | Boys' doubles |
| Silver medal – second place | 2004 Richmond | Mixed team |
Asian Junior Championships
| Gold medal – first place | 2004 Hwacheon | Boys' doubles |
| Silver medal – second place | 2004 Hwacheon | Boys' team |

Jung Jung-young (Korean: 정정영; born 20 October 1986) is a South Korean badminton player who affiliate with Yone team since 2019. In 2004, he won the boys' doubles gold medal at the Asian Junior Championships and silver medal at the World Junior Championships partnered with Lee Yong-dae. He and Lee also won the 2004 Indonesia Junior tournament.

== Achievements ==
=== World Junior Championships ===
Boys' doubles
| Year | Venue | Partner | Opponent | Score | Result |
|---|---|---|---|---|---|
| 2004 | Minoru Arena, Richmond, Canada | (South Korea) Lee Yong-dae | (Malaysia) Hoon Thien How (Malaysia) Tan Boon Heong | 6–15, 15–3, 12–15 | Silver |

=== Asian Junior Championships ===
Boys' doubles
| Year | Venue | Partner | Opponent | Score | Result |
|---|---|---|---|---|---|
| 2004 | Hwacheon Indoor Stadium, Hwacheon, South Korea | (South Korea) Lee Yong-dae | (South Korea) Jeon Jun-bum (South Korea) Yoo Yeon-seong | 15–11, 15–3 | Gold |

=== BWF International Challenge/Series ===
Men's doubles
| Year | Tournament | Partner | Opponent | Score | Result |
|---|---|---|---|---|---|
| 2017 | Mongolia International | (South Korea) Shin Hee-kwang | (South Korea) Jung Suk-hoon (South Korea) Lee Ji-su | 21–12, 18–21, 21–11 | (gold) Winner |

Mixed doubles
| Year | Tournament | Partner | Opponent | Score | Result |
|---|---|---|---|---|---|
| 2017 | Mongolia International | (South Korea) Ko Hye-ryeon | (Mongolia) Olonbayar Enkhbat (Mongolia) Dashdondov Bulgamaa | 21–11, 21–16 | (gold) Winner |

BWF International Challenge tournament
BWF International Series tournament
