= Tan Boon Heong =

Malaysian badminton player (born 1987)

Tan Boon Heong 陈文宏
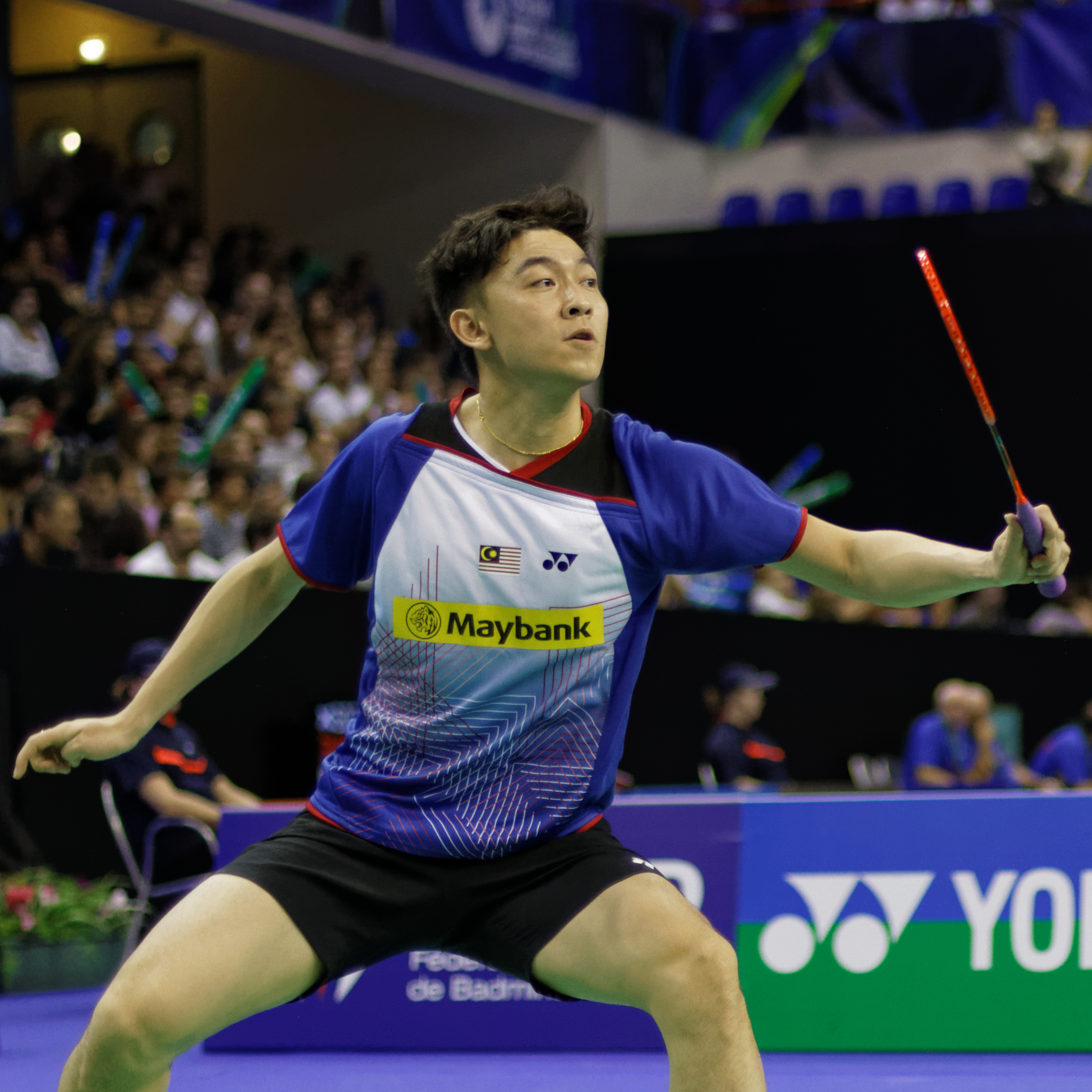

Personal information
- Born: 18 September 1987 (age 39) Alor Setar, Kedah, Malaysia
- Years active: 2004 – 2019
- Height: 1.81 m (5 ft 11 in)
- Weight: 75 kg (165 lb; 11.8 st)

Sport
- Country: Malaysia
- Sport: Badminton
- Handedness: Left
- Coached by: Rexy Mainaky; Lee Wan Wah
- Retired: 2019

Men's doubles
- Highest ranking: 1 (11 October 2007 with koo kien keat)
- BWF profile
Medal record
Men's badminton
Representing Malaysia
World Championships
Silver medal – second place	2010 Paris	Men's doubles
Bronze medal – third place	2009 Hyderabad	Men's doubles
Sudirman Cup
Bronze medal – third place	2009 Guangzhou	Mixed team
Thomas Cup
Silver medal – second place	2014 New Delhi	Men's team
Bronze medal – third place	2006 Sendai & Tokyo	Men's team
Bronze medal – third place	2008 Jakarta	Men's team
Bronze medal – third place	2010 Kuala Lumpur	Men's team
Bronze medal – third place	2016 Kunshan	Men's team
Commonwealth Games
Gold medal – first place	2010 Delhi	Men's doubles
Gold medal – first place	2010 Delhi	Mixed team
Asian Games
Gold medal – first place	2006 Doha	Men's doubles
Silver medal – second place	2010 Guangzhou	Men's doubles
Bronze medal – third place	2006 Doha	Men's team
Bronze medal – third place	2014 Incheon	Men's team
Asian Championships
Silver medal – second place	2006 Johor Bahru	Men's doubles
Silver medal – second place	2007 Johor Bahru	Men's doubles
Bronze medal – third place	2008 Johor Bahru	Men's doubles
Southeast Asian Games
Silver medal – second place	2009 Vientiane	Men's doubles
Silver medal – second place	2009 Vientiane	Men's team
World Junior Championships
Gold medal – first place	2004 Richmond	Boys' doubles
Commonwealth Youth Games
Gold medal – first place	2004 Bendigo	Mixed team
Asian Junior Championships
Bronze medal – third place	2004 Hwacheon	Boys' team
Bronze medal – third place	2005 Jakarta	Boys' team

Tan Boon Heong
- Traditional Chinese: 陳文宏
- Simplified Chinese: 陈文宏
Transcriptions
Standard Mandarin
- Hanyu Pinyin: Chén Wénhóng
Yue: Cantonese
- Jyutping: Can4 Man4 Wang4
Southern Min
- Hokkien POJ: Tân Bûn-hông

Tan Boon Heong (Chinese: 陈文宏; pinyin: Chén Wénhóng; Pe̍h-ōe-jī: Tân Bûn-hông, born 18 September 1987) is a former World No.1 Malaysian professional badminton player in the men's doubles event.

== Career ==
=== 2004-2006 ===
Tan was previously paired with Hoon Thien How, with whom he won the World Junior Championships in 2004 and a silver medal at the 2006 Asian Badminton Championships.

=== 2006 ===
Nearing the Doha Asian Games in 2006, Rexy Mainaky (the Malaysian doubles coach) decided to split them up and partner Tan Boon Heong with Koo Kien Keat instead. This move, nevertheless, proved to be spot-on as this pair went on to become the Asian Games champion, winning the gold medal in their maiden outing by defeating the then Chinese world champions, Cai Yun and Fu Haifeng, in the quarterfinals, Indonesia's Markis Kido and Hendra Setiawan in the semifinals, and finally Luluk Hadiyanto and Alvent Yulianto, also from Indonesia, in the finals. They are the youngest men's doubles to win gold medal at Asian Games at the age of 21 and 19 respectively.

=== 2007 ===
2007 was the best year for Koo and Tan. They became the first qualifiers to win the Superseries at the Malaysian Open. They also became the World No.1 that year. They won their first All England Open after beating Chinese pair, Cai Yun and Fu Haifeng in straight games.

=== 2008 ===
They competed at the 2008 Olympics, reaching the quarter-finals.

=== 2009 ===
At the Japan Open, Tan set the world record for badminton smashes at 421 km/h. This was done under lab conditions and recorded by Yonex representatives, and not in an official match. Later, he and Koo Kien Keat won the bronze medal at the 2009 World Championships.

=== 2010 ===
At the 2010 BWF World Championships, Tan and partner Koo Kien Keat launched themselves into the semifinals after beating Korean rivals Lee Yong-dae and Jung Jae-sung. In the semifinals they defeated China's Guo Zhendong and Xu Chen 21–14, 21–18. Tan Boon Heong and Koo Kien Keat were the first Malaysian pair to enter a World Championships final in 13 years. In the finals, they played China's Cai Yun and Fu Haifeng and lost 21–18, 18–21, 14–21. The year 2010 was the last time Koo and Tan ranked World No. 1.

=== 2011 ===
At the 2011 All England Open, Tan and Koo defeated 2008 Olympic champions Markis Kido and Hendra Setiawan in the quarterfinals. They then defeated World champions Cai Yun and Fu Haifeng 21–11, 23–21. They lost to Danes and world no.1 Mathias Boe and Carsten Mogensen 21–15, 18–21, 18–21. In doing so, they failed to win their second All England Open title.

=== 2012 ===
Tan competed at the 2012 Olympics with Koo Kien Keat, reaching the semi-finals, and losing 0–2 in the bronze medal match to the Koreans.

=== 2013 ===
Tan and Koo suffered a lot of early round exits in 2013 and a three-year major title drought but they managed to remain in the top 5 of the world ranking.

=== 2014 ===
As of March 2014, following the resignation of his partner, Koo Kien Keat, which was due to their deteriorating performance, Tan was scratch partnered with several men's doubles players including Goh V Shem, Ow Yao Han, Hoon Thien How and Tan Wee Kiong. Following the tournament, Tan has been officially re-partnered with Hoon Thien How. In August that year, Koo returned to play his last tournament with Tan at the 2014 BWF World Championships. Their last match together was in the third round where they lost to Chinese Taipei pair Lee Sheng-mu and Tsai Chia-hsin with a score of 19–21 in the deciding game.

=== 2015 ===
In early 2015, Tan announced his resignation from the Badminton Association of Malaysia. Koo and Tan announced that they are coming out of retirement and try to qualify for the 2016 Rio Olympics before they call it quits for good. They are currently sponsored by Seri Mutiara Development Sdn Bhd. They have achieved some breakthroughs this year. Winning the Dutch Open and runners-up in the Thailand Open. They have also made it to 2 Superseries quarterfinals in Australia and Korea.

=== 2016 ===
In 2016, Koo and Tan managed to enter the top 15 of the world rankings. However, due to the new Olympic qualification requirement set by the BWF whereby each country can send two representatives for each event only if they are both in the top 8 of the world rankings in their discipline and if they are not then only the highest ranked representative will contest, Koo and Tan narrowly failed to qualify for the Olympics.

=== 2017 ===
Tan and Hendra Setiawan debut tournament at the 2017 Syed Modi International, they managed to advance until the quarter-finals. They reached the final round at the Australian Open but were beaten by third seed Takeshi Kamura and Keigo Sonoda from Japan.

=== 2018 ===
Tan was partner with Yoo Yeon Seong from South Korea. Subsequently, he was partner with Kim Sa Rang and they play together in men's doubles in 18/19 Purple League.

=== 2019 ===
Tan was also currently training with Goh V Shem, Tan Wee Kiong, Goh Liu Ying and Chan Peng Soon after their resignation from Badminton Association of Malaysia.

== Personal life ==
Tan Boon Heong is married to beautician Sherlyn Tan Yean Ling since 2016.

== Achievements ==
=== BWF World Championships ===
Men's doubles
Year	Venue	Partner	Opponent	Score	Result
2009	Gachibowli Indoor Stadium, Hyderabad, India	(Malaysia) Koo Kien Keat	(South Korea) Jung Jae-sung (South Korea) Lee Yong-dae	21–16, 14–21, 20–22	Bronze
2010	Stade Pierre de Coubertin, Paris, France	(Malaysia) Koo Kien Keat	(China) Cai Yun (China) Fu Haifeng	21–18, 18–21, 14–21	Silver

=== Commonwealth Games ===
Men's doubles
Year	Venue	Partner	Opponent	Score	Result
2010	Siri Fort Sports Complex, New Delhi, India	(Malaysia) Koo Kien Keat	(England) Anthony Clark (England) Nathan Robertson	21–19, 21–14	Gold

=== Asian Games ===
Men's doubles
Year	Venue	Partner	Opponent	Score	Result
2006	Aspire Hall 3, Doha, Qatar	(Malaysia) Koo Kien Keat	(Indonesia) Luluk Hadiyanto (Indonesia) Alvent Yulianto	21–13, 21–14	Gold
2010	Tianhe Gymnasium, Guangzhou, China	(Malaysia) Koo Kien Keat	(Indonesia) Markis Kido (Indonesia) Hendra Setiawan	21–16, 24–26, 19–21	Silver

=== Asian Championships ===
Men's doubles
Year	Venue	Partner	Opponent	Score	Result
2006	Bandaraya Stadium, Johor Bahru, Malaysia	(Malaysia) Hoon Thien How	(Malaysia) Choong Tan Fook (Malaysia) Lee Wan Wah	21–17, 11–21, 12–21	Silver
2007	Bandaraya Stadium, Johor Bahru, Malaysia	(Malaysia) Koo Kien Keat	(Malaysia) Choong Tan Fook (Malaysia) Lee Wan Wah	14–21, 21–11, 12–21	Silver
2008	Bandaraya Stadium, Johor Bahru, Malaysia	(Malaysia) Koo Kien Keat	(South Korea) Jung Jae-sung (South Korea) Lee Yong-dae	21–16, 16–21, 18–21	Bronze

=== Southeast Asian Games ===
Men's doubles
Year	Venue	Partner	Opponent	Score	Result
2009	Gym Hall 1, National Sports Complex, Vientiane, Laos	(Malaysia) Koo Kien Keat	(Indonesia) Markis Kido (Indonesia) Hendra Setiawan	17–21, 17–21	Silver

=== World Junior Championships ===
Boys' doubles
Year	Venue	Partner	Opponent	Score	Result
2004	Minoru Arena, Richmond, Canada]	(Malaysia) Hoon Thien How	(South Korea) Lee Yong-dae (South Korea) Jung Jung-young	15–6, 3–15, 15–12	Gold

=== BWF Superseries (8 titles, 10 runners-up) ===
The BWF Superseries, which was launched on 14 December 2006 and implemented in 2007, was a series of elite badminton tournaments, sanctioned by the Badminton World Federation (BWF). BWF Superseries levels were Superseries and Superseries Premier. A season of Superseries consisted of twelve tournaments around the world that had been introduced since 2011. Successful players were invited to the Superseries Finals, which were held at the end of each year.

Men's doubles
Year	Tournament	Partner	Opponent	Score	Result
2007	Malaysia Open	(Malaysia) Koo Kien Keat	(United States) Tony Gunawan (Indonesia) Candra Wijaya	21–15, 21–18	(gold) Winner
2007	All England Open	(Malaysia) Koo Kien Keat	(China) Cai Yun (China) Fu Haifeng	21–15, 21–18	(gold) Winner
2007	Swiss Open	(Malaysia) Koo Kien Keat	(Denmark) Jens Eriksen (Denmark) Martin Lundgaard Hansen	17–21, 21–16, 21–12	(gold) Winner
2007	Denmark Open	(Malaysia) Koo Kien Keat	(Denmark) Jens Eriksen (Denmark) Martin Lundgaard Hansen	14–21, 21–14, 21–12	(gold) Winner
2008	World Superseries Masters Finals	(Malaysia) Koo Kien Keat	(South Korea) Jung Jae-sung (South Korea) Lee Yong-dae	21–18, 21–14	(gold) Winner
2009	Swiss Open	(Malaysia) Koo Kien Keat	(Denmark) Mathias Boe (Denmark) Carsten Mogensen	21–14, 21–18	(gold) Winner
2009	Denmark Open	(Malaysia) Koo Kien Keat	(Denmark) Mathias Boe (Denmark) Carsten Mogensen	20–22, 21–14, 21–17	(gold) Winner
2009	French Open	(Malaysia) Koo Kien Keat	(Indonesia) Markis Kido (Indonesia) Hendra Setiawan	21–15, 15–21, 14–21	(silver) Runner-up
2009	China Open	(Malaysia) Koo Kien Keat	(South Korea) Jung Jae-sung (South Korea) Lee Yong-dae	13–21, 21–19, 18–21	(silver) Runner-up
2010	Malaysia Open	(Malaysia) Koo Kien Keat	(China) Guo Zhendong (China) Xu Chen	21–15, 17–21, 21–16	(gold) Winner
2010	Swiss Open	(Malaysia) Koo Kien Keat	(South Korea) Ko Sung-hyun (South Korea) Yoo Yeon-seong	18–21, 16–21	(silver) Runner-up
2010	Japan Open	(Malaysia) Koo Kien Keat	(China) Cai Yun (China) Fu Haifeng	21–18, 14–21, 12–21	(silver) Runner-up
2011	All England Open	(Malaysia) Koo Kien Keat	(Denmark) Mathias Boe (Denmark) Carsten Mogensen	21–15, 18–21, 18–21	(silver) Runner-up
2012	Japan Open	(Malaysia) Koo Kien Keat	(South Korea) Kim Gi-jung (South Korea) Kim Sa-rang	16–21, 19–21	(silver) Runner-up
2012	Denmark Open	(Malaysia) Koo Kien Keat	(South Korea) Shin Baek-cheol (South Korea) Yoo Yeon-seong	21–19, 11–21, 19–21	(silver) Runner-up
2012	Hong Kong Open	(Malaysia) Koo Kien Keat	(China) Cai Yun (China) Fu Haifeng	16–21, 17–21	(silver) Runner-up
2013	French Open	(Malaysia) Koo Kien Keat	(Indonesia) Marcus Fernaldi Gideon (Indonesia) Markis Kido	16–21, 18–21	(silver) Runner-up
2017	Australian Open	(Indonesia) Hendra Setiawan	(Japan) Takeshi Kamura (Japan) Keigo Sonoda	17–21, 19–21	(silver) Runner-up

BWF Super Series Finals tournament
BWF Super Series Premier tournament
BWF Super Series tournament

=== BWF Grand Prix (8 titles, 5 runners-up) ===
The BWF Grand Prix had two levels, the Grand Prix and Grand Prix Gold. It was a series of badminton tournaments sanctioned by the Badminton World Federation (BWF) and played between 2007 and 2017. The World Badminton Grand Prix was sanctioned by the International Badminton Federation from 1983 to 2006.

Men's doubles
Year	Tournament	Partner	Opponent	Score	Result
2006	Japan Open	(Malaysia) Koo Kien Keat	(United States) Tony Gunawan (Indonesia) Candra Wijaya	15–21, 14–21	(silver) Runner-up
2007	Philippines Open	(Malaysia) Koo Kien Keat	(China) Guo Zhendong (China) Xie Zhongbo	21–8, 26–24	(gold) Winner
2007	Macau Open	(Malaysia) Koo Kien Keat	(Malaysia) Choong Tan Fook (Malaysia) Lee Wan Wah	21–18, 17–21, 23–21	(gold) Winner
2008	Macau Open	(Malaysia) Koo Kien Keat	(Chinese Taipei) Fang Chieh-min (Chinese Taipei) Lee Sheng-mu	21–16, 21–18	(gold) Winner
2009	Malaysia Grand Prix Gold	(Malaysia) Koo Kien Keat	(Malaysia) Gan Teik Chai (Malaysia) Tan Bin Shen	21–11, 21–13	(gold) Winner
2009	Macau Open	(Malaysia) Koo Kien Keat	(Malaysia) Choong Tan Fook (Malaysia) Lee Wan Wah	21–14, 17–21, 21–12	(gold) Winner
2011	Malaysia Grand Prix Gold	(Malaysia) Koo Kien Keat	(Indonesia) Hendra Aprida Gunawan (Indonesia) Alvent Yulianto	21–16, 21–7	(gold) Winner
2012	Malaysia Grand Prix Gold	(Malaysia) Koo Kien Keat	(Malaysia) Chooi Kah Ming (Malaysia) Ow Yao Han	21–15, 21–19	(gold) Winner
2013	Malaysia Grand Prix Gold	(Malaysia) Koo Kien Keat	(Malaysia) Goh V Shem (Malaysia) Lim Khim Wah	20–22, 15–21	(silver) Runner-up
2015	Thailand Open	(Malaysia) Koo Kien Keat	(Indonesia) Wahyu Nayaka (Indonesia) Ade Yusuf	22–20, 21–23, 16–21	(silver) Runner-up
2015	Dutch Open	(Malaysia) Koo Kien Keat	(India) Manu Attri (India) B. Sumeeth Reddy	21–15, 21–10	(gold) Winner
2016	Malaysia Masters	(Malaysia) Koo Kien Keat	(Indonesia) Marcus Fernaldi Gideon (Indonesia) Kevin Sanjaya Sukamuljo	21–18, 13–21, 18–21	(silver) Runner-up
2016	Vietnam Open	(Malaysia) Koo Kien Keat	(Chinese Taipei) Lee Jhe-huei (Chinese Taipei) Lee Yang	21–18, 14–21, 7–21	(silver) Runner-up

BWF Grand Prix Gold tournament
BWF Grand Prix tournament

=== BWF International Challenge/Series (4 titles, 2 runners-up) ===
Men's doubles
Year	Tournament	Partner	Opponent	Score	Result
2015	Sri Lanka International	(Malaysia) Koo Kien Keat	(Malaysia) Chooi Kah Ming (Malaysia) Ow Yao Han	21–19, 21–17	(gold) Winner
2015	White Nights	(Malaysia) Koo Kien Keat	(England) Marcus Ellis (England) Chris Langridge	21–10, 21–12	(gold) Winner
2015	Swiss International	(Malaysia) Koo Kien Keat	(England) Peter Briggs (England) Tom Wolfenden	18–21, 21–16, 21–16	(gold) Winner
2019	Perth International	(Malaysia) Shia Chun Kang	(Chinese Taipei) Lee Chia-hao (Chinese Taipei) Liu Wei-chi	21–17, 21–16	(gold) Winner
2019	South Australia International	(Malaysia) Shia Chun Kang	(South Korea) Kim Duk-young (South Korea) Kim Sa-rang	14–21, 21–17, 16–21	(silver) Runner-up
2019	Dubai International	(Malaysia) Shia Chun Kang	(Japan) Keiichiro Matsui (Japan) Yoshinori Takeuchi	14–21, 14–21	(silver) Runner-up

BWF International Challenge tournament
BWF International Series tournament
BWF Future Series tournament

== Record against selected opponents ==
Men's doubles results with Koo Kien Keat against Superseries finalists, World Championships semi-finalists, and Olympic quarterfinalists, plus all Olympic opponents.

- (China) Cai Yun & Fu Haifeng 3-14
- (China) Chai Biao & Guo Zhendong 1–0
- (China) Sun Junjie & Xu Chen 0–1
- (China) Cai Yun & Xu Chen 0–1
- (China) Liu Xiaolong & Qiu Zihan 6–1
- (China) Guo Zhendong & Xie Zhongbo 1–0
- (China) Chai Biao & Hong Wei 0–1
- (China) Guo Zhendong & Xu Chen 3–0
- (Chinese Taipei) Fang Chieh-min & Lee Sheng-mu 1–1
- (Chinese Taipei) Lee Sheng-mu & Tsai Chia-hsin 2–3
- (Denmark) Lars Påske & Jonas Rasmussen 3–2
- (Denmark) Mathias Boe & Carsten Mogensen 10–5
- (Denmark) Jonas Rasmussen & Mads Conrad-Petersen 1–1
- (Denmark) Jens Eriksen & Martin Lundgård Hansen 4–0
- (England) / (Scotland) Anthony Clark & Robert Blair 1–1
- (England) Anthony Clark & Nathan Robertson 2–1
- (Indonesia) Mohammad Ahsan & Bona Septano 2–3
- (Indonesia) Luluk Hadiyanto & Alvent Yulianto Chandra 1–1
- (Indonesia) Markis Kido & Hendra Setiawan 7–4
- (Indonesia) Angga Pratama & Rian Agung Saputro 1–1
- (Indonesia) Kevin Sanjaya Sukamuljo & Marcus Fernaldi Gideon 0-3
- (Indonesia) Mohammad Ahsan & Hendra Setiawan 2–1
- (Indonesia) Markis Kido & Marcus Fernaldi Gideon 0–1
- (Japan) Shuichi Sakamoto & Shintaro Ikeda 3–2
- (Japan) Naoki Kawamae & Shoji Sato 5–0
- (Japan) Hirokatsu Hashimoto & Noriyasu Hirata 2–2
- (Japan) Hiroyuki Endo & Kenichi Hayakawa 3–0
- (South Korea) Cho Gun-woo & Shin Baek-cheol 1–0
- (South Korea) Jung Jae-sung & Lee Yong-dae 3–13
- (South Korea) Ko Sung-hyun & Yoo Yeon-seong 1–6
- (South Korea) Lee Jae-jin & Hwang Ji-man 1–1
- (South Korea) Ko Sung-hyun & Lee Yong-dae 1–2
- (South Korea) Lee Yong-dae & Yoo Yeon-seong 0–1
- (South Korea) Kim Gi-jung & Kim Sa-rang 1–6
- (Malaysia) Choong Tan Fook & Lee Wan Wah 3–1
- (Malaysia) Mohd Zakry Abdul Latif & Mohd Fairuzizuan Mohd Tazari 6–4
- (Malaysia) Goh V Shem & Tan Wee Kiong 0-2
- (Thailand) Bodin Isara & Maneepong Jongjit 2–0
- (United States) Howard Bach & Tony Gunawan 3–0
- (United States) / (Indonesia) Tony Gunawan & Candra Wijaya 2–2

== Filmography ==
- Sepahtu Reunion Live

Year:2022 Role:himself Channel:Astro Warna

Program

- Maharaja Lawak Mega

Year:2022 Role:Guest Pair:Boro
