= 2012 India Super Series =

2012 All England Super Series
Tournament details
- Dates: 24–29 April 2012
- Level: Super Series Premier
- Total prize money: US$200,000
- Venue: Siri Fort Indoor Stadium
- Location: New Delhi, India

Champions
- Men's singles: (South Korea) Son Wan-ho
- Women's singles: (China) Li Xuerui
- Men's doubles: (Thailand) Bodin Isara (Thailand) Maneepong Jongjit
- Women's doubles: (South Korea) Jung Kyung-eun (South Korea) Kim Ha-na
- Mixed doubles: (Indonesia) Tontowi Ahmad (Indonesia) Liliyana Natsir

The 2012 India Super Series was the fourth super series tournament of the 2012 BWF Super Series. The tournament took place in New Delhi, India from 24–29 April 2012 and had out a total purse of $200,000.

== Men's singles ==
=== Seeds ===
1. (Malaysia) Lee Chong Wei (final)
2. (Denmark) Peter Gade (quarter-finals)
3. (China) Chen Jin (quarter-finals)
4. (Japan) Sho Sasaki (first round)
5. (South Korea) Lee Hyun-il (first round)
6. (Indonesia) Simon Santoso (first round)
7. (Indonesia) Taufik Hidayat (quarter-finals)
8. (Denmark) Jan Ø. Jørgensen (withdrew)

=== Top half ===
First Round
1	(Malaysia) Lee C W	21	21
(Chinese Taipei) Hsueh H-y	8	19
PFQ	(India) S Varma	15	21	11
(India) A Jayaram	21	17	21
7	(Indonesia) T Hidayat	21	21
(Hong Kong) Hu Y	11	19
(Indonesia) D H Rumbaka	17	15
(China) Wang ZM	21	21
4	(Japan) S Sasaki	17	8
(Chinese Taipei) Hsu J-h	21	21
Q1	(Russia) V Ivanov	21	21
Q3	(Singapore) Yong Z A C	18	13
6	(Indonesia) S Santoso	15	15
(Denmark) H-K Vittinghus	21	21
PFQ	(Malaysia) Chong W F	21	21
Q4	(Thailand) S Avihingsanon	7	16

Second Round
1	(Malaysia) Lee C W	21	15	21
(India) A Jayaram	16	21	5
7	(Indonesia) T Hidayat	16	21	21
(China) Wang ZM	21	16	11
(Chinese Taipei) Hsu J-h	21	10	22
Q1	(Russia) V Ivanov	16	21	20
(Denmark) H-K Vittinghus	21	8	21
PFQ	(Malaysia) Chong W F	13	21	12

Quarterfinals
1	(Malaysia) Lee C W	21	21
7	(Indonesia) T Hidayat	16	13
(Chinese Taipei) Hsu J-h	21	21
(Denmark) H-K Vittinghus	19	18

Semifinals
1	(Malaysia) Lee C W	21	21
(Chinese Taipei) Hsu J-h	13	7

=== Bottom half ===
First Round
(India) K Parupalli	21	21
(Belgium) Y Tan	11	14
(Thailand) B Ponsana	17	21	21
5	(South Korea) Lee H-i	21	14	13
(Japan) K Yamada	24	21	13
(Malaysia) M H Hashim	26	14	21
(Hong Kong) Wong W K	17	16
3	(China) Chen J	21	21
(South Korea) Son W-h	21	24
(Malaysia) D Liew	12	22
(Indonesia) T Sugiarto	21	21
PFQ	(Singapore) Zi L D W	10	9
(India) R.M.V. Gurusaidatt	21	18	19
Q2	(Thailand) T Saensomboonsuk	16	21	21
(France) B Leverdez	11	21	12
2	(Denmark) P Gade	21	19	21

Second Round
(India) K Parupalli	15	21	22
(Thailand) B Ponsana	21	14	20
(Malaysia) M H Hashim	18	15
3	(China) Chen J	21	21
(South Korea) Son W-h	21	21
(Indonesia) T Sugiarto	13	17
(Thailand) T Saensomboonsuk	19	20
2	(Denmark) P Gade	21	22

Quarterfinals
(India) K Parupalli	w	/	o
3	(China) Chen J
(South Korea) Son W-h	24	21
2	(Denmark) P Gade	22	18

Semifinals
(India) K Parupalli	14	21	16
(South Korea) Son W-h	21	19	21

=== Finals ===
Semifinals
1	(Malaysia) Lee Chong Wei	21	21
(Chinese Taipei) Hsu Jen-hao	13	7
(India) Kashyap Parupalli	14	21	16
(South Korea) Son Wan-ho	21	19	21

Final
1	(Malaysia) Lee Chong Wei	18	21	19
(South Korea) Son Wan-ho	21	14	21

== Women's singles ==
=== Seeds ===
1. (China) Wang Shixian (quarter-finals)
2. (China) Li Xuerui (champion)
3. (India) Saina Nehwal (second round)
4. (China) Jiang Yanjiao (semi-finals)
5. (Denmark) Tine Baun (second round)
6. (Germany) Juliane Schenk (final)
7. (Thailand) Ratchanok Intanon (first round)
8. (South Korea) Sung Ji-hyun (second round)

=== Top half ===
First Round
1	(China) Wang SX	21	21
(Thailand) S Taerattanachai	13	13
(Thailand) P Buranaprasertsuk	16	17
(Japan) A Goto	21	21
6	(Germany) J Schenk	21	21
(Indonesia) A Firdasari	16	11
Q3	(Thailand) N Jindapon	13	22	21
(Japan) E Hirose	21	20	14
3	(India) S Nehwal	21	21
(Hong Kong) Yip P Y	14	6
(Indonesia) M F Kusumastuti	12	9
(South Korea) Bae Y-j	21	21
5	(Denmark) T Baun	21	22
(Japan) S Sato	15	20
(Indonesia) A Yuswandari	17	11
Q2	(China) Chen XJ	21	21

Second Round
1	(China) Wang SX	21	21
(Japan) A Goto	19	19
6	(Germany) J Schenk	21	21
Q3	(Thailand) N Jindapon	15	12
3	(India) S Nehwal	19	10
(South Korea) Bae Y-j	21	21
5	(Denmark) T Baun	13	17
Q2	(China) Chen XJ	21	21

Quarterfinals
1	(China) Wang SX	21	10	16
6	(Germany) J Schenk	6	21	21
(South Korea) Bae Y-j	17	13
Q3	(China) Chen XJ	21	21

Semifinals
6	(Germany) J Schenk	21	21
Q3	(China) Chen XJ	16	13

=== Bottom half ===
First Round
(Chinese Taipei) Tai T-y	17	19
(India) P.V. Sindhu	21	21
(Scotland) S Egelstaff	19	7
8	(South Korea) Sung J-h	21	21
(Switzerland) J Cicognini	18	17
(Netherlands) Yao J	21	21
Q1	(India) A Pantawane	9	11
4	(China) Jiang YJ	21	21
PFQ	(Malaysia) Tee J Y	18	21	19
Q4	(India) N Pandit	21	9	21
(Singapore) Gu J	21	21	11
7	(Thailand) R Intanon	23	19	6^{r}
PFQ	(Canada) N Grether	14	14
(Singapore) Fu MT	21	21
(Bulgaria) P Nedelcheva	17	21	12
2	(China) Li XR	21	18	21

Second Round
(India) P.V. Sindhu	21	22
8	(South Korea) Sung J-h	17	20
(Netherlands) Yao J	11	10
4	(China) Jiang YJ	21	21
Q4	(India) N Pandit	13	10
(Singapore) Gu J	21	21
(Singapore) Fu MT	19	11
2	(China) Li XR	21	21

Quarterfinals
(India) P.V. Sindhu	21	12	18
4	(China) Jiang YJ	18	21	21
(Singapore) Gu J	15	11
2	(China) Li XR	21	21

Semifinals
4	(China) Jiang YJ
2	(China) Li XR	w	/	o

=== Finals ===
Semifinals
6	(Germany) Juliane Schenk	21	21
Q3	(China) Chen Xiaojia	16	13
4	(China) Jiang Yanjiao
2	(China) Li Xuerui	w	/	o

Final
6	(Germany) Juliane Schenk	21	17	8
2	(China) Li Xuerui	14	21	21

== Men's doubles ==
=== Seeds ===
1. (South Korea) Jung Jae-sung / Lee Yong-dae
2. (South Korea) Ko Sung-hyun / Yoo Yeon-seong
3. (China) Chai Biao / Guo Zhendong
4. (Indonesia) Mohammad Ahsan / Bona Septano
5. (Japan) Hirokatsu Hashimoto / Noriyasu Hirata
6. (Malaysia) Koo Kien Keat / Tan Boon Heong
7. (Japan) Naoki Kawamae / Shoji Sato
8. (Indonesia) Alvent Yulianto Chandra / Hendra Aprida Gunawan

=== Top half ===
First Round
1	(South Korea) Jung J-s (South Korea) Lee Y-d
(India) K.T. R Kumar (India) S Thomas	w	/	o
(South Korea) Kim K-j (South Korea) Kim S-r	21	21
PFQ	(India) B Antony (India) Suraj P.H.	17	12
5	(Japan) H Hashimoto (Japan) N Hirata	19	15
(Thailand) P Chalardchaleam (Thailand) N Puangpuapech	21	21
(Thailand) B Issara (Thailand) M Jongjit	21	21
(India) P Chopra (India) A Dewalker	12	11
3	(China) Chai B (China) Guo ZD	21	21
PFQ	(India) M Behal (India) M Mohan K.K.	9	7
(Indonesia) A Pratama (Indonesia) R A Saputro	21	21
(India) K Tarun (India) A Vishnu	15	10
6	(Malaysia) Koo K K (Malaysia) Tan B H	21	7
(England) C Adcock (England) A Ellis	9	2^{r}
(China) Liu XL (China) Qiu ZH	17	26	13
(Japan) H Endo (Japan) K Hayakawa	21	24	21

Second Round
(India) R Kumar K.T. (India) S Thomas	21	18	21
(South Korea) Kim K-j (South Korea) Kim S-r	18	21	19
(Thailand) P Chalardchaleam (Thailand) N Puangpuapech	19	19
(Thailand) B Issara (Thailand) M Jongjit	21	21
3	(China) Chai B (China) Guo ZD	21	17	14
(Indonesia) A Pratama (Indonesia) R A Saputro	14	21	21
6	(Malaysia) Koo K K (Malaysia) Tan B H	21	21
(Japan) H Endo (Japan) K Hayakawa	18	18

Quarterfinals
(India) R Kumar K.T. (India) S Thomas	12	12
(Thailand) B Issara (Thailand) M Jongjit	21	21
(Indonesia) A Pratama (Indonesia) R A Saputro	21	15	21
6	(Malaysia) Koo K K (Malaysia) Tan B H	18	21	19

Semifinals
(Thailand) B Issara (Thailand) M Jongjit	21	20	21
(Indonesia) A Pratama (Indonesia) R A Saputro	15	22	15

=== Bottom half ===
First Round
Q4
(Russia) V Ivanov (Russia) I Sozonov
Q1
8	(Indonesia) A Y Chandra (Indonesia) H A Gunawan
Q3	(India) G Raju G. (India) S Sharma	7	15
(Malaysia) Goh V S (Malaysia) Lim K W	21	21
PFQ	(India) S Reddy B (India) H Babu T.	12	13
4	(Indonesia) M Ahsan (Indonesia) B Septano	21	21
(India) M Attri (India) J Sanyal	13	17
(Poland) A Cwalina (Poland) M Logosz	21	21
(China) Hong W (China) Shen Y	21	23	21
7	(Japan) N Kawamae (Japan) S Sato	13	25	19
(India) M Gupta (India) G Venkat	21	15	21
Q2	(India) Sanjeeth S. (India) J Yadav	14	21	15
(Indonesia) Y R Sugiarto (Indonesia) A Y Wirawan	14	9
2	(South Korea) Ko S-h (South Korea) Yoo Y-s	21	21

Second Round
(Russia) V Ivanov (Russia) I Sozonov	21	21
8	(Indonesia) A Y Chandra (Indonesia) H A Gunawan	14	18
(Malaysia) Goh V S (Malaysia) Lim K W	13	21	21
4	(Indonesia) M Ahsan (Indonesia) B Septano	21	19	18
(Poland) A Cwalina (Poland) M Logosz	10	17
(China) Hong W (China) Shen Y	21	21
(India) M Gupta (India) G Venkat	10	9
2	(South Korea) Ko S-h (South Korea) Yoo Y-s	21	21

Quarterfinals
(Russia) V Ivanov (Russia) I Sozonov	17	21	10
(Malaysia) Goh V S (Malaysia) Lim K W	21	16	10
(China) Hong W (China) Shen Y	21	17	12
2	(South Korea) Ko S-h (South Korea) Yoo Y-s	15	21	21

Semifinals
(Malaysia) Goh V S (Malaysia) Lim K W	15	16
2	(South Korea) Ko S-h (South Korea) Yoo Y-s	21	21

=== Finals ===
Semifinals
(Thailand) Bodin Issara (Thailand) Maneepong Jongjit	21	20	21
(Indonesia) Angga Pratama (Indonesia) Rian Agung Saputro	15	22	15
(Malaysia) Goh V Shem (Malaysia) Lim Khim Wah	15	16
2	(South Korea) Ko Sung-hyun (South Korea) Yoo Yeon-seong	21	21

Final
(Thailand) Bodin Issara (Thailand) Maneepong Jongjit	21	14	21
2	(South Korea) Ko Sung-hyun (South Korea) Yoo Yeon-seong	17	21	14

== Women's doubles ==
=== Seeds ===
1. (South Korea) Ha Jung-eun / Kim Min-jung
2. (Japan) Mizuki Fujii / Reika Kakiiwa
3. (Japan) Miyuki Maeda / Satoko Suetsuna
4. (Japan) Shizuka Matsuo / Mami Naito
5. (Indonesia) Meiliana Jauhari / Greysia Polii
6. (South Korea) Jung Kyung-eun / Kim Ha-na
7. (Hong Kong) Poon Lok Yan / Tse Ying Suet
8. (Singapore) Shinta Mulia Sari / Lei Yao

=== Top half ===
First Round
1	(South Korea) Ha J-e (South Korea) Kim M-j
Bye; Bye
(United States) I Wang (United States) R Wang
(Malaysia) Goh L Y (Malaysia) Lim Y L	w	/	o
5	(Indonesia) M Jauhari (Indonesia) G Polii	w	/	o
(Netherlands) L Jonathans (Netherlands) P van Dooremalen
(India) A Balan (India) N. S Reddy	13	13
(China) Bao YX (China) Zhong QX	21	21
3	(Japan) M Maeda (Japan) S Suetsuna	w	/	o
(England) M Agathangelou (England) H Olver
(Indonesia) A F Agustin (Indonesia) N K Maheswari	w	/	o
(Thailand) S Amitapai (Thailand) S Taerattanachai
7	(Hong Kong) Poon L Y (Hong Kong) Tse Y S
(India) J Gutta (India) A Ponnappa	w	/	o
(United States) E Lee (United States) P L Obanana	21	10	12
(Indonesia) V Marissa (Indonesia) N Melati	11	21	21

Second Round
1	(South Korea) Ha J-e (South Korea) Kim M-j	21	21
(Malaysia) Goh L Y (Malaysia) Lim Y L	13	19
5	(Indonesia) M Jauhari (Indonesia) G Polii	21	20	18
(China) Bao YX (China) Zhong QX	17	22	21
3	(Japan) M Maeda (Japan) S Suetsuna	21	18	21
(Indonesia) A F Agustin (Indonesia) N K Maheswari	15	21	14
(India) J Gutta (India) A Ponnappa	16	21	21
(Indonesia) V Marissa (Indonesia) N Melati	21	15	17

Quarterfinals
1	(South Korea) Ha J-e (South Korea) Kim M-j	21	20	16
(China) Bao YX (China) Zhong QX	18	22	21
3	(Japan) M Maeda (Japan) S Suetsuna	19	21	21
(India) J Gutta (India) A Ponnappa	21	13	14

Semifinals
(China) Bao YX (China) Zhong QX	25	21
3	(Japan) M Maeda (Japan) S Suetsuna	23	14

=== Bottom half ===
First Round
(Thailand) D Aroonkesorn (Thailand) K Voravichitchaikul	19	21	21
(India) P Gadre (India) P Sawant	21	11	10
(China) Luo Y (China) Luo Y	21	18
6	(South Korea) Jung K-e (South Korea) Kim H-n	23	21
(Japan) M Matsutomo (Japan) A Takahashi	21	21
(Canada) N Grether (Canada) C Reid	12	12
(China) Xia H (China) Tang JH	21	21
4	(Japan) S Matsuo (Japan) M Naito	11	17
(South Korea) Eom H-w (South Korea) Jang Y-n	21	21
(India) P. Jyotshna (India) P.C. Thulasi	13	14
(Malaysia) Hoo V K M (Malaysia) Woon K W	21	13	9
8	(Singapore) S M Sari (Singapore) Yao L	15	21	21
(Russia) V Sorokina (Russia) N Vislova	13	14
(Malaysia) Chin E H (Malaysia) Wong P T	21	21
(Germany) S Marinello (Germany) B Michels	21	19	14
2	(Japan) M Fujii (Japan) R Kakiiwa	12	21	21

Second Round
(Thailand) D Aroonkesorn (Thailand) K Voravichitchaikul	9	10
6	(South Korea) Jung K-e (South Korea) Kim H-n	21	21
(Japan) M Matsutomo (Japan) A Takahashi	21	9	21
(China) Xia H (China) Tang JH	14	21	14
(South Korea) Eom H-w (South Korea) Jang Y-n	19	21	24
8	(Singapore) S M Sari (Singapore) Yao Lei	21	14	22
(Malaysia) Chin E H (Malaysia) Wong P T	16	11
2	(Japan) M Fujii (Japan) R Kakiiwa	21	21

Quarterfinals
6	(South Korea) Jung K-e (South Korea) Kim H-n	21	23
(Japan) M Matsutomo (Japan) A Takahashi	12	21
(South Korea) Eom H-w (South Korea) Jang Y-n	9	17
2	(Japan) M Fujii (Japan) R Kakiiwa	21	21

Semifinals
6	(South Korea) Jung K-e (South Korea) Kim H-n	11	21	21
2	(Japan) M Fujii (Japan) R Kakiiwa	21	18	19

=== Finals ===
Semifinals
(China) Bao Yixin (China) Zhong Qianxin	25	21
3	(Japan) Miyuki Maeda (Japan) Satoko Suetsuna	23	14
6	(South Korea) Jung Kyung-eun (South Korea) Kim Ha-na	11	21	21
2	(Japan) Mizuki Fujii (Japan) Reika Kakiiwa	21	18	19

Final
(China) Bao Yixin (China) Zhong Qianxin	17	18
6	(South Korea) Jung Kyung-eun (South Korea) Kim Ha-na	21	21

== Mixed doubles ==
=== Seeds ===
1. (China) Xu Chen / Ma Jin
2. (Indonesia) Tantowi Ahmad / Lilyana Natsir
3. (South Korea) Lee Yong-dae / Ha Jung-eun
4. (Malaysia) Chan Peng Soon / Goh Liu Ying
5. (Thailand) Sudket Prapakamol / Saralee Thoungthongkam
6. (England) / (Scotland) Chris Adcock / Imogen Bankier
7. (Japan) Shintaro Ikeda / Reiko Shiota
8. (Russia) Aleksandr Nikolaenko / Valeria Sorokina

=== Top half ===
First Round
PFQ	(India) T Kona (India) A Ponnappa	20	21	22
(Indonesia) M Rijal (Indonesia) D Susanto	22	18	20
(South Korea) Kim K-j (South Korea) Jung K-e	21	16	17
(Japan) S Sato (Japan) S Matsuo	13	21	21
6	(England) C Adcock (Scotland) I Bankier	w	d	n
Q1
(India) Diju V. (India) J Gutta	18	19
(China) Tao JM (China) Xia H	21	21
4	(Malaysia) Chan P S (Malaysia) Goh L Y	21	13	22
(South Korea) Yoo Y-s (South Korea) Jang Y-n	19	21	20
(Japan) N Hirata (Japan) M Maeda	16	21	21
(India) P Chopra (India) P Sawant	21	19	11
5	(Thailand) S Prapakamol (Thailand) S Thoungthongkam	21	21
(China) Qiu ZH (China) Luo Y	15	17
PFQ	(India) G Venkat (India) J Dewangan
Q4

Second Round
PFQ	(India) T Kona (India) A Ponnappa	12	14
(Japan) S Sato (Japan) S Matsuo	21	21
(China) Tao JM (China) Xia H
4	(Malaysia) Chan P S (Malaysia) Goh L Y	21	21
(Japan) N Hirata (Japan) M Maeda	16	13
5	(Thailand) S Prapakamol (Thailand) S Thoungthongkam	21	21
PFQ	(India) G Venkat (India) J Dewangan	6	15

Quarterfinals
(Japan) S Sato (Japan) S Matsuo	22	14	10
(China) Tao JM (China) Xia H	20	21	21
4	(Malaysia) Chan P S (Malaysia) Goh L Y	14	21	18
5	(Thailand) S Prapakamol (Thailand) S Thoungthongkam	21	15	21

Semifinals
(China) Tao JM (China) Xia H	19	20
5	(Thailand) S Prapakamol (Thailand) S Thoungthongkam	21	22

=== Bottom half ===
First Round
(Indonesia) F Kurniawan (Indonesia) S P Irawati
Q2
(India) A Vishnu (India) A Balan	9	19
7	(Japan) S Ikeda (Japan) R Shiota	21	21
(Switzerland) A Dumartheray (Switzerland) S Jaquet	13	21	21
PFQ	(Malaysia) Ong J G (Malaysia) Lim Y L	21	19	18
(India) A Dewalker (India) P Gadre	18	15
3	(South Korea) Lee Y-d (South Korea) Ha J-e	21	21
(India) H Babu T. (India) P. Jyotshna	13	13
(China) He HB (China) Bao YX	21	21
Q3
8	(Russia) A Nikolaenko (Russia) V Sorokina
(Singapore) D B Chrisnanta (Singapore) Y Y V Neo	21	17	21
(India) M Attri (India) S Reddy N.	11	21	15
(South Korea) Ko S-h (South Korea) Eom H-w	9	21	18
2	(Indonesia) T Ahmad (Indonesia) L Natsir	21	17	21

Second Round
(Indonesia) F Kurniawan (Indonesia) S P Irawati	19	12
7	(Japan) S Ikeda (Japan) R Shiota	21	21
(Switzerland) A Dumartheray (Switzerland) S Jacquet	10	16
3	(South Korea) Lee Y-d (South Korea) Ha J-e	21	21
(China) He HB (China) Bao YX	21	23
8	(Russia) A Nikolaenko (Russia) V Sorokina	19	21
(Singapore) D B Chrisnanta (Singapore) Y Y V Neo	12	15
2	(Indonesia) T Ahmad (Indonesia) L Natsir	21	21

Quarterfinals
7	(Japan) S Ikeda (Japan) R Shiota	21	13	14
3	(South Korea) Lee Y-d (South Korea) Ha J-e	19	21	21
(China) He HB (China) Bao YX	16	14
2	(Indonesia) T Ahmad (Indonesia) L Natsir	21	21

Semifinals
3	(South Korea) Lee Y-d (South Korea) Ha J-e	7	14
2	(Indonesia) T Ahmad (Indonesia) L Natsir	21	21

=== Finals ===
Semifinals
(China) Tao Jiaming (China) Xia Huan	19	20
5	(Thailand) Sudket Prapakamol (Thailand) Saralee Thoungthongkam	21	22
3	(South Korea) Lee Yong-dae (South Korea) Ha Jung-eun	7	14
2	(Indonesia) Tantowi Ahmad (Indonesia) Lilyana Natsir	21	21

Final
5	(Thailand) Sudket Prapakamol (Thailand) Saralee Thoungthongkam	16	21	14
2	(Indonesia) Tantowi Ahmad (Indonesia) Lilyana Natsir	21	12	21

Preceded by 2011 India Super Series	India Open	Succeeded by 2013 India Super Series
Preceded by 2012 All England Super Series Premier	BWF Super Series; 2012 season	Succeeded by 2012 Indonesia Super Series Premier
