= 2011 India Super Series =

Tournament details
- Dates: April 26, 2011 - May 1, 2011
- Edition: 1st
- Total prize money: US$200,000
- Venue: Siri Fort Indoor Stadium
- Location: New Delhi, India

Champions
- Men's singles: (Malaysia) Lee Chong Wei
- Women's singles: (Thailand) Porntip Buranaprasertsuk
- Men's doubles: (Japan) Hirokatsu Hashimoto (Japan) Noriyasu Hirata
- Women's doubles: (Japan) Miyuki Maeda (Japan) Satoko Suetsuna
- Mixed doubles: (Indonesia) Tontowi Ahmad (Indonesia) Liliyana Natsir

The 2011 India Super Series was the fourth super series tournament of the 2011 BWF Super Series. It was the first competition under the new format where a select group of Super Series events were elevated to premier status. The tournament was held in New Delhi, India from 26 April – 1 May 2011 and had a total purse of $200,000.

== Men's singles ==
=== Seeds ===
1. (Malaysia) Lee Chong Wei (champion)
2. (Indonesia) Taufik Hidayat (quarter-finals)
3. (Denmark) Peter Gade (final)
4. (Thailand) Boonsak Ponsana (first round)
5. (Indonesia) Simon Santoso (first round)
6. (South Korea) Park Sung-hwan (semi-finals)
7. (Japan) Kenichi Tago (second round)
8. (Hong Kong) Hu Yun (semi-finals)

=== Top half ===
First Round
1	(Malaysia) Lee C W	21	21
(India) A Jayaram	19	18
(South Korea) Lee H-i	21	21
(Indonesia) D H Rumbaka	16	19
7	(Japan) K Tago	25	21
(France) B Leverdez	23	13
(Indonesia) S D Kuncoro	18	19
Q4	(India) S Verma	21	21
4	(Thailand) B Ponsana	20	21	19
(India) G Dutt	22	18	21
(Belgium) Y Tan	21	21
(France) M L Ying Ping	12	19
8	(Hong Kong) Hu Y	13	21	21
(Indonesia) A Yunus	21	17	19
(Malaysia) Liew D	23	12
(Hong Kong) Chan Y K	25	21

Second Round
1	(Malaysia) Lee C W	21	21
(South Korea) Lee H-i	13	17
7	(Japan) K Tago	19	21	11
Q4	(India) S Verma	21	18	21
(India) G Dutt	21	14	21
(Belgium) Y Tan	13	21	13
8	(Hong Kong) Hu Y	21	21
(Hong Kong) Chan Y K	16	14

Quarterfinals
1	(Malaysia) Lee C W	21	21
Q4	(India) S Verma	7	8
(India) G Dutt	10	16
8	(Hong Kong) Hu Y	21	21

Semifinals
1	(Malaysia) Lee C W	21	21
8	(Hong Kong) Hu Y	11	15

=== Bottom half ===
First Round
Q2	(India) B. Sai Praneeth	19	12
(Hong Kong) Wong W K	21	21
(Japan) T Ueda	21	22
5	(Indonesia) S Santoso	13	20
(India) A Pawar	21	17	12
(Japan) S Sasaki	19	21	21
(Japan) K Yamada	21	20	8
3	(Denmark) P Gade	13	22	21
(South Korea) Son W-h	21	21
Q1	(India) Prannoy H. S.	14	12
(India) A Bhat	14	16
6	(South Korea) Park S-h	21	21
(Slovakia) M Matejka	7	15
(India) P Kashyap	21	21
Q3	(India) A Sridhar	13	5
2	(Indonesia) T Hidayat	21	21

Second Round
(Hong Kong) Wong W K	19	21	16
(Japan) T Ueda	21	18	21
(Japan) S Sasaki	12	17
3	(Denmark) P Gade	21	21
(South Korea) Son W-h	12	17
6	(South Korea) Park S-h	21	21
(India) P Kashyap	17	19
2	(Indonesia) T Hidayat	21	21

Quarterfinals
(Japan) T Ueda	21	10
3	(Denmark) P Gade	23	21
6	(South Korea) Park S-h	21	21
2	(Indonesia) Taufik Hidayat	17	17

Semifinals
3	(Denmark) P Gade	21	21
6	(South Korea) Park S-h	15	19

=== Finals ===
Semifinals
1	(Malaysia) Lee Chong Wei	21	21
8	(Hong Kong) Hu Yun	11	15
3	(Denmark) Peter Gade	21	21
6	(South Korea) Park Sung-hwan	15	19

Final
1	(Malaysia) Lee Chong Wei	21	12	21
3	(Denmark) Peter Gade	12	21	15

== Women's singles ==
=== Seeds ===
1. (India) Saina Nehwal (first round)
2. (Denmark) Tine Baun (second round)
3. (South Korea) Bae Yeon-ju (final)
4. (Hong Kong) Yip Pui Yin (semi-finals)
5. (Japan) Eriko Hirose (second round)
6. (South Korea) Sung Ji-hyun (second round)
7. (Netherlands) Yao Jie (quarter-finals)
8. (Thailand) Salakjit Ponsana (second round)

=== Top half ===
First Round
1	(India) S Nehwal	17	19
(Japan) A Goto	21	21
(Singapore) Gu J	21	21
(Indonesia) M F Kusumastuti	11	11
5	(Japan) E Hirose	18	21	21
(Indonesia) A Firdasari	21	8	16
(Thailand) P Buranaprasertsuk	21	14	21
Q3	(Hong Kong) Poon L Y	16	21	16
4	(Hong Kong) Yip P Y	21	21
(India) A Mutatkar	14	8
(Japan) K Imabeppu	18	21	21
(Thailand) N Jindapol	21	11	19
6	(South Korea) Sung J-h	21	16	21
(Singapore) Fu MT	14	21	13
(Hong Kong) Chan T K	21	13	14
(Thailand) R Intanon	16	21	21

Second Round
(Japan) A Goto	21	8	23
(Singapore) Gu J	17	21	25
5	(Japan) E Hirose	9	21	20
(Thailand) P Buranaprasertsuk	21	15	22
4	(Hong Kong) Yip P Y	21	21
(Japan) K Imabeppu	16	19
6	(South Korea) Sung J-h	14	24	12
(Thailand) R Intanon	21	22	21

Quarterfinals
(Singapore) Gu J	16	21
(Thailand) P Buranaprasertsuk	21	23
4	(Hong Kong) Yip P Y	21	21
(Thailand) R Intanon	17	15

Semifinals
(Thailand) P Buranaprasertsuk	21	21
4	(Hong Kong) Yip P Y	13	8

=== Bottom half ===
First Round
(Indonesia) A Yuswandari	21	21
Q2	(India) T Murgunde	12	5
(Austria) S Prutsch	15	6
7	(Netherlands) Yao J	21	21
(Indonesia) L Fanetri	24	19	21
(Japan) A Kurihara	22	21	18
(Slovenia) M Tvrdy	0^{r}
3	(South Korea) Bae Y-j	1
(Belgium) L Tan	3	11
(Japan) S Sato	21	21
Q4	(India) P. V. Sindhu	19	20
8	(Thailand) S Ponsana	21	22
Q1	(India) S Gokhale	21	21	19
(Singapore) Chen JY	23	15	21
(Singapore) Xing AY	22	16	12
2	(Denmark) T Baun	20	21	21

Second Round
(Indonesia) A Yuswandari	10	21	10
7	(Netherlands) Yao J	21	19	21
(Indonesia) L Fanetri	15	10
3	(South Korea) Bae Y-j	21	21
(Japan) S Sato	22	21
8	(Thailand) S Ponsana	20	12
(Singapore) Chen JY	21	21
2	(Denmark) T Baun	13	11

Quarterfinals
7	(Netherlands) Yao J	13	18
3	(South Korea) Bae Y-j	21	21
(Japan) S Sato	18	21	21
(Singapore) Chen JY	21	15	15

Semifinals
3	(South Korea) Bae Y-j	23	15	21
(Japan) S Sato	21	21	12

=== Finals ===
Semifinals
(Thailand) Porntip Buranaprasertsuk	21	21
4	(Hong Kong) Yip Pui Yin	13	8
3	(South Korea) Bae Yeon-ju	23	15	21
(Japan) Sayaka Sato	21	21	12

Final
(Thailand) Porntip Buranaprasertsuk	21	21
3	(South Korea) Bae Yeon-ju	13	16

== Men's doubles ==
=== Seeds ===
1. (Malaysia) Koo Kien Keat / Tan Boon Heong (semi-finals)
2. (Indonesia) Mohammad Ahsan / Bona Septano (second round)
3. (Indonesia) Alvent Yulianto / Hendra Aprida Gunawan (semi-finals)
4. (Japan) Hirokatsu Hashimoto / Noriyasu Hirata (champions)
5. (South Korea) Cho Gun-woo / Kwon Yi-goo (quarter-finals)
6. (Japan) Naoki Kawamae / Shōji Satō (quarter-finals)
7. (Japan) Hiroyuki Endo / Kenichi Hayakawa (quarter-finals)
8. (India) Rupesh Kumar K. T. / Sanave Thomas (second round)

=== Top half ===
First Round
(India) G Manish (India) G Venkat	6	9
(Japan) Y Hirobe (Japan) K Kazuno	21	21
(Thailand) P Chalardchaleam (Thailand) N Phuangphuapet	21	21
(India) A Dewalkar (India) A Vishnu	18	17
(India) P Chopra (India) T Kona	17	16
(Indonesia) Y R Sugiarto (Indonesia) A Y Wirawan	21	21

Second Round
1	(Malaysia) Koo K K (Malaysia) Tan B H	21	21
(India) M Attri (India) J Sanyal	9	14
5	(South Korea) Cho G-w (South Korea) Kwon Y-g	21	21
(Japan) Y Hirobe (Japan) K Kazuno	12	13
4	(Japan) H Hashimoto (Japan) N Hirata	21	21
(Thailand) P Chalardchaleam (Thailand) N Phuangphuapet	9	15
8	(India) R Kumar K. T. (India) S Thomas	19	12
(Indonesia) Y R Sugiarto (Indonesia) A Y Wirawan	21	21

Quarterfinals
1	(Malaysia) Koo K K (Malaysia) Tan B H	21	21
5	(South Korea) Cho G-w (South Korea) Kwon Y-g	19	16
4	(Japan) H Hashimoto (Japan) N Hirata	21	21
(Indonesia) Y R Sugiarto (Indonesia) A Y Wirawan	15	18

Semifinals
1	(Malaysia) Koo K K (Malaysia) Tan B H	16	19
4	(Japan) H Hashimoto (Japan) N Hirata	21	21

=== Bottom half ===
First Round
(India) SDS Krishna (India) V Manuel	10	7
(South Korea) Kim G-j (South Korea) Kim S-r	21	21
(India) U Mishra (India) R Singh	9	17
(Malaysia) M Z A Latif (Malaysia) Hoon T H	21	21
(Malaysia) Chan P S (Malaysia) Tan W K	21	21
(India) S Sahitya (India) J Yadav	7	17
(Thailand) S Anugritayawon (Thailand) S Prapakamol	21	7	11
(Indonesia) A Pratama (Indonesia) R A Saputro	16	21	21

Second Round
(South Korea) Kim G-j (South Korea) Kim S-r	19	16
7	(Japan) H Endo (Japan) K Hayakawa	21	21
(Malaysia) M Z A Latif (Malaysia) Hoon T H	21	15	16
3	(Indonesia) A Yulianto (Indonesia) H A Gunawan	12	21	21
(Malaysia) Chan P S (Malaysia) Tan W K	15	22	15
6	(Japan) N Kawamae (Japan) S Satō	21	20	21
(Indonesia) A Pratama (Indonesia) R A Saputro	16	21	21
2	(Indonesia) M Ahsan (Indonesia) B Septano	21	16	15

Quarterfinals
7	(Japan) H Endo (Japan) K Hayakawa	15	17
3	(Indonesia) A Yulianto (Indonesia) H A Gunawan	21	21
6	(Japan) N Kawamae (Japan) S Satō	14	19
(Indonesia) A Pratama (Indonesia) R A Saputro	21	21

Semifinals
3	(Indonesia) A Yulianto (Indonesia) H A Gunawan	23	18	14
(Indonesia) A Pratama (Indonesia) R A Saputro	21	21	21

=== Finals ===
Semifinals
1	(Malaysia) Koo Kien Keat (Malaysia) Tan Boon Heong	16	19
4	(Japan) Hirokatsu Hashimoto (Japan) Noriyasu Hirata	21	21
3	(Indonesia) Alvent Yulianto (Indonesia) Hendra Aprida Gunawan	23	18	14
(Indonesia) Angga Pratama (Indonesia) Rian Agung Saputro	21	21	21

Final
4	(Japan) Hirokatsu Hashimoto (Japan) Noriyasu Hirata	21	21
(Indonesia) Angga Pratama (Indonesia) Rian Agung Saputro	17	9

== Women's doubles ==
=== Seeds ===
1. (Japan) Miyuki Maeda / Satoko Suetsuna (champions)
2. (Japan) Mizuki Fujii / Reika Kakiiwa (final)
3. (Thailand) Duanganong Aroonkesorn / Kunchala Voravichitchaikul (second round)
4. (Indonesia) Meiliana Jauhari / Greysia Polii (semi-finals)
5. (Singapore) Shinta Mulia Sari / Yao Lei (second round)
6. (Japan) Shizuka Matsuo / Mami Naito (second round)
7. (Japan) Misaki Matsutomo / Ayaka Takahashi (second round)
8. (India) Jwala Gutta / Ashwini Ponnappa (second round)

=== Top half ===
First Round
(India) M Nair (India) M Sahdev	10	13
(South Korea) Chang Y-n (South Korea) Kim M-s	21	21
(Thailand) S Amitrapai (Thailand) S Nessara	15	21	17
(Singapore) Fu MT (Singapore) Gu J	21	11	21
(Malaysia) Chin E H (Malaysia) Wong P T	21	21
(India) P. C. Thulasi (India) N. S Reddy	7	11

Second Round
1	(Japan) M Maeda (Japan) S Suetsuna	21	21
(India) P Gadre (India) P. Jyotshna	8	16
6	(Japan) S Matsuo (Japan) M Naito	19	25
(South Korea) Chang Y-n (South Korea) Kim M-s	21	27
4	(Indonesia) M Jauhari (Indonesia) G Polii	21	21
(Singapore) F MT (Singapore) Gu J	13	13
8	(India) J Gutta (India) A Ponnappa	20	18
(Malaysia) Chin E H (Malaysia) Wong P T	22	21

Quarterfinals
1	(Japan) M Maeda (Japan) S Suetsuna	21	21
(South Korea) Chang Y-n (South Korea) Kim M-s	11	13
4	(Indonesia) M Jauhari (Indonesia) G Polii	21	21
(Malaysia) Chin E H (Malaysia) Wong P T	15	16

Semifinals
1	(Japan) M Maeda (Japan) S Suetsuna	25	21
4	(Indonesia) M Jauhari (Indonesia) G Polii	23	8

=== Bottom half ===
First Round
(India) S Ghorpade (India) S Rane	21	13	12
(Malaysia) Chong S C (Malaysia) Goh L Y	19	21	21
(Singapore) Chen JY (Singapore) Xing AY	20	19
(Hong Kong) Poon L Y (Hong Kong) Tse Y S	22	21
(India) A Balan (India) P Sawant	13	9
(South Korea) Jung K-e (South Korea) Kim H-n	21	21

Second Round
(Malaysia) Chong S C (Malaysia) Goh L Y	w	/	o
5	(Singapore) S M Sari (Singapore) Yao L
(Hong Kong) Poon L Y (Hong Kong) Tse Y S	21	21
3	(Thailand) D Aroonkesorn (Thailand) K Voravichitchaikul	19	18
(South Korea) Jung K-e (South Korea) Kim H-n	21	21
7	(Japan) M Matsutomo (Japan) A Takahashi	17	14
(Indonesia) A F Agustin (Indonesia) N K Maheswari	16	18
2	(Japan) M Fujii (Japan) R Kakiiwa	21	21

Quarterfinals
(Malaysia) Chong S C (Malaysia) Goh L Y	21	10
(Hong Kong) Poon L Y (Hong Kong) Tse Y S	23	21
(South Korea) Jung K-e (South Korea) Kim H-n	21	18	18
2	(Japan) M Fujii (Japan) R Kakiiwa	8	21	21

Semifinals
(Hong Kong) Poon L Y (Hong Kong) Tse Y S	17	21	16
2	(Japan) M Fujii (Japan) R Kakiiwa	21	16	21

=== Finals ===
Semifinals
1	(Japan) Miyuki Maeda (Japan) Satoko Suetsuna	25	21
4	(Indonesia) Meiliana Jauhari (Indonesia) Greysia Polii	23	8
(Hong Kong) Poon Lok Yan (Hong Kong) Tse Ying Suet	17	21	16
2	(Japan) Mizuki Fujii (Japan) Reika Kakiiwa	21	16	21

Final
1	(Japan) Miyuki Maeda (Japan) Satoko Suetsuna	26	21
2	(Japan) Mizuki Fujii (Japan) Reika Kakiiwa	24	15

== Mixed doubles ==
=== Seeds ===
1. (Thailand) Sudket Prapakamol / Saralee Thungthongkam (second round)
2. (Thailand) Songphon Anugritayawon / Kunchala Voravichitchaikul (quarter-finals)
3. (Indonesia) Fran Kurniawan / Pia Zebadiah Bernadet (final)
4. (Indonesia) Tontowi Ahmad / Liliyana Natsir (champions)
5. (Malaysia) Chan Peng Soon / Goh Liu Ying (semi-finals)
6. (India) Valiyaveetil Diju / Jwala Gutta (first round)
7. (Indonesia) Muhammad Rijal / Debby Susanto (semi-finals)
8. (Japan) Shintaro Ikeda / Reiko Shiota (second round)

=== Top half ===
First Round
(Japan) S Satō (Japan) S Matsuo	21	21
(South Korea) Kwon Y-g (South Korea) Kim H-n	18	18
7	(Indonesia) M Rijal (Indonesia) D Susanto	21	21
(India) G Venkat (India) J Dewangan	6	11
(India) P Chopra (India) P Sawant	21	21
(Japan) K Kazuno (Japan) A Takahashi	14	18
(South Korea) Cho G-w (South Korea) Kim M-s	21	21
(India) J Sanyal (India) P. Jyotshna	12	14
6	(India) V. Diju (India) J Gutta
(South Korea) Kim S-r (South Korea) Chang Y-n	w	/	o
(Indonesia) N Widianto (Indonesia) V Marissa	21	21
(Japan) H Hashimoto (Japan) M Fujii	12	15

Second Round
1	(Thailand) S Prapakamol (Thailand) S Thungthongkam	19	16
(Japan) S Satō (Japan) S Matsuo	21	21
7	(Indonesia) M Rijal (Indonesia) D Susanto	21	19	21
(India) P Chopra (India) P Sawant	11	21	13
4	(Indonesia) T Ahmad (Indonesia) L Natsir	21	16	21
(South Korea) Cho G-w (South Korea) Kim M-s	8	21	14
(South Korea) Kim S-r (South Korea) Chang Y-n	12	15
(Indonesia) N Widianto (Indonesia) V Marissa	21	21

Quarterfinals
(Japan) S Satō (Japan) S Matsuo	8	21	19
7	(Indonesia) M Rijal (Indonesia) D Susanto	21	15	21
4	(Indonesia) T Ahmad (Indonesia) L Natsir	17	21	21
(Indonesia) N Widianto (Indonesia) V Marissa	21	12	9

Semifinals
7	(Indonesia) M Rijal (Indonesia) D Susanto	17	9^{r}
4	(Indonesia) T Ahmad (Indonesia) L Natsir	21	15

=== Bottom half ===
First Round
(Thailand) M Jongjit (Thailand) S Amitrapai	22	21
(Malaysia) Ong J G (Malaysia) Chong S C	20	6
(India) A Vishnu (India) A Balan	18	21	14
8	(Japan) S Ikeda (Japan) R Shiota	21	17	21
(India) P Singh (India) N Saini	7	9
(Hong Kong) Wong W H (Hong Kong) Chau H W	21	21
(Japan) N Hirata (Japan) M Maeda	17	17
(India) A Dewalkar (India) P Gadre	21	21
(India) T Kona (India) A Ponnappa	21	10
5	(Malaysia) Chan P S (Malaysia) Goh L Y	23	21
(Japan) K Hayakawa (Japan) M Matsutomo	16	21	22
(South Korea) Kim G-j (South Korea) Jung K-e	21	17	24

Second Round
(Thailand) M Jongjit (Thailand) S Amitrapai	21	17	22
8	(Japan) S Ikeda (Japan) R Shiota	18	21	20
(Hong Kong) Wong W H (Hong Kong) Chau H W	12	17
3	(Indonesia) F Kurniawan (Indonesia) P Z Bernadet	21	21
(India) A Dewalkar (India) P Gadre	18	24	12
5	(Malaysia) Chan P S (Malaysia) Goh L Y	21	22	21
(South Korea) Kim G-j (South Korea) Jung K-e	19	13
2	(Thailand) S Anugritayawon (Thailand) K Voravichitchaikul	21	21

Quarterfinals
(Thailand) M Jongjit (Thailand) S Amitrapai	15	10
3	(Indonesia) F Kurniawan (Indonesia) P Z Bernadet	21	21
5	(Malaysia) Chan P S (Malaysia) Goh L Y	21	21
2	(Thailand) S Anugritayawan (Thailand) K Voravichitchaikul	13	16

Semifinals
3	(Indonesia) F Kurniawan (Indonesia) P Z Bernadet	21	21
5	(Malaysia) Chan P S (Malaysia) Goh L Y	12	16

=== Finals ===
Semifinals
7	(Indonesia) Muhammad Rijal (Indonesia) Debby Susanto	17	9^{r}
4	(Indonesia) Tontowi Ahmad (Indonesia) Liliyana Natsir	21	15
3	(Indonesia) Fran Kurniawan (Indonesia) Pia Zebadiah Bernadet	21	21
5	(Malaysia) Chan Peng Soon (Malaysia) Goh Liu Ying	12	16

Final
4	(Indonesia) Tontowi Ahmad (Indonesia) Liliyana Natsir	21	23
3	(Indonesia) Fran Kurniawan (Indonesia) Pia Zebadiah Bernadet	18	21

Preceded by 2010 India Open Grand Prix Gold	India Super Series	Succeeded by 2012 India Super Series
Preceded by 2011 All England Super Series	BWF Super Series; 2011 season	Succeeded by 2011 Singapore Super Series
