= 2013 India Super Series =

Tournament details
- Dates: 23–28 April 2013
- Level: Super Series
- Total prize money: US$200,000
- Venue: Siri Fort Indoor Stadium
- Location: New Delhi, India

Champions
- Men's singles: (Malaysia) Lee Chong Wei
- Women's singles: (Thailand) Ratchanok Intanon
- Men's doubles: (China) Liu Xiaolong (China) Qiu Zihan
- Women's doubles: (Japan) Miyuki Maeda (Japan) Satoko Suetsuna
- Mixed doubles: (Indonesia) Tontowi Ahmad (Indonesia) Liliyana Natsir

The 2013 India Super Series was the fourth super series tournament of the 2013 BWF Super Series. The tournament was held in New Delhi, India, from 23 to 28 April 2013 and had a total purse of $200,000. A qualification was held to fill four places in both singles events and Men's doubles of the main draws.

== Men's singles ==
=== Seeds ===
1. (Malaysia) Lee Chong Wei
2. (Indonesia) Sony Dwi Kuncoro (withdrew)
3. (Hong Kong) Hu Yun (second round)
4. (Denmark) Jan Ø. Jørgensen (first round)
5. (India) Parupalli Kashyap (first round)
6. (Japan) Kenichi Tago
7. (Thailand) Boonsak Ponsana(semi-finals)
8. (Japan) Sho Sasaki (withdrew)

=== Top half ===
First round
1	(Malaysia) Lee C W	21	21
(Republic of Ireland) S Evans	16	5
(Hong Kong) Wong W K	16	21	12
(Japan) K Sakai	21	18	21
5	(India) P Kashyap	21	21	18
(Indonesia) T Hidayat	13	23	21
(Thailand) S Avihingsanon	17	20
Q4	(India) Prannoy H. S.	21	22
4	(Denmark) J Ø Jørgensen	7	21	12
PFQ	(India) K. Srikanth	21	18	21
(India) G Datt R.M.V.	21	21
(Indonesia) T Sugiarto	16	17
7	(Thailand) B Ponsana	21	21
(Chinese Taipei) Chou T-c	4	4
(Thailand) T Saensomboonsuk	21	15	21
(England) R Ouseph	17	21	9

Second round
1	(Malaysia) Lee C W	21	21
(Japan) K Sakai	17	9
(Indonesia) T Hidayat	24	9
Q4	(India) Prannoy H. S.	26	21
PFQ	(India) K. Srikanth	12	16
(India) G Datt R.M.V.	21	21
7	(Thailand) B Ponsana	21	21
(Thailand) T Saensomboonsuk	12	10

Quarterfinals
1	(Malaysia) Lee C W	21	21
(India) Prannoy H. S.	14	19
(India) G Datt R.M.V.	12	21	12
7	(Thailand) B Ponsana	21	11	21

Semifinals
1	(Malaysia) Lee C W	21	18	21
7	(Thailand) B Ponsana	11	21	8

=== Bottom half ===
First round
(China) Chen YK	22	21	14
(Indonesia) D H Rumbaka	24	19	21
(India) A Jayaram	21	21
PFQ	(Russia) V Malkov	17	17
(India) A Pawar	11	21	21
(Japan) T Ueda	21	13	19
(Indonesia) S Santoso	18	21	6
3	(Hong Kong) Hu Y	21	13	21
(India) S Varma	21	21
Q1	(India) C Anand	13	8
Q3	(India) A Bhat	9	9
6	(Japan) K Tago	21	21
(India) S Praneeth	21	21
(Japan) K Momota	17	11
Q2	(India) S Dey	17	11
PFQ	(Malaysia) I S Zainuddin	21	21

Second round
(Indonesia) D H Rumbaka	15	12
(India) A Jayaram	21	21
(India) A Pawar	21	15	21
3	(Hong Kong) Hu Y	15	21	10
(India) S Varma	21	16	14
6	(Japan) K Tago	19	21	21
(India) S Praneeth	16	29	21
(Malaysia) I S Zainuddin	21	27	16

Quarterfinals
(India) A Jayaram	6	16
(India) A Pawar	21	21
6	(Japan) K Tago	21	19	21
(India) S Praneeth	17	21	11

Semifinals
(India) A Pawar	16	11
6	(Japan) K Tago	21	21

=== Finals ===
Semifinals
1	(Malaysia) Lee Chong Wei	21	18	21
7	(Thailand) Boonsak Ponsana	11	21	8
(India) Anand Pawar	16	11
6	(Japan) Kenichi Tago	21	21

Final
1	(Malaysia) Lee Chong Wei	21	18	21
6	(Japan) Kenichi Tago	15	21	17

== Women's singles ==
=== Seeds ===
1. (India) Saina Nehwal
2. (Germany) Juliane Schenk
3. (Thailand) Ratchanok Inthanon
4. (Japan) Minatsu Mitani (second round)
5. (South Korea) Bae Youn-joo
6. (Japan) Eriko Hirose (second round)
7. (China) Jiang Yanjiao (withdrew)
8. (India) Pusarla Venkata Sindhu

=== Top half ===
First round
1	(India) S Nehwal	21	21
(Indonesia) B Manuputi	12	15
(Japan) Y Hashimoto	21	21
(Singapore) Xing AY	17	12
8	(India) P V Sindhu	17	21	21
(China) Yao X	21	18	14
(Singapore) Gu J	9	16
(China) Yu S	21	21
3	(Thailand) R Inthanon	21	21
PFQ	(India) S Gokhale	8	12
(Japan) S Takahashi	21	13	16
(Hong Kong) Chan T K	8	21	21
PFQ	(India) N Pandit	21	11
Q2	(India) T Murgunde	11	4^{r}
(India) A Pantawane	21	17	21
(Thailand) S Taerattanachai	14	21	19

Second round
1	(India) S Nehwal	21	12	20
(Japan) Y Hashimoto	13	21	22
8	(India) P.V. Sindhu	19	21	21
(China) Yu S	21	19	15
3	(Thailand) R Inthanon	21	21
(Hong Kong) Chan T K	6	9
PFQ	(India) N Pandit	18	20
(India) A Pantawane	21	22

Quarterfinals
(Japan) Y Hashimoto	16	16
8	(India) P.V. Sindhu	21	21
3	(Thailand) R Inthanon	14	21	21
(India) A Pantawane	21	7	16

Semifinals
8	(India) P V Sindhu	12	6
3	(Thailand) R Inthanon	21	21

=== Bottom half ===
First round
(Thailand) N Jindapon	21	21
(Austria) S Prutsch	8	10
(India) P. C. Thulasi	7	13
6	(Japan) E Hirose	21	21
(Indonesia) A Yuswandari	25	21
(Russia) N Perminova	23	6
Q3	(India) G R Shivani	10	20
4	(Japan) M Mitani	21	22
(India) T Lad	21	20	14
Q4	(India) S Rane	14	22	21
(Hong Kong) Yip P Y	21	18	18
5	(South Korea) Bae Y-j	12	21	21
(Japan) K Imabeppu	14	17
(Thailand) B Ongbumrungpan	21	21
Q1	(India) R Das	12	15
2	(Germany) J Schenk	21	21

Second round
(Thailand) N Jindapon	24	21
6	(Japan) E Hirose	22	16
(Indonesia) A Yuswandari	27	23
4	(Japan) M Mitani	25	21
Q4	(India) S Rane	16	19
5	(South Korea) Bae Y-j	21	21
(Thailand) B Ongbumrungpan	17	12
2	(Germany) J Schenk	21	21

Quarterfinals
(Thailand) N Jindapon	21	16	18
(Indonesia) A Yuswandari	18	21	21
5	(South Korea) Bae Y-j	17	13
2	(Germany) J Schenk	21	21

Semifinals
(Indonesia) A Yuswandari	18	18
2	(Germany) J Schenk	21	21

=== Finals ===
Semifinals
8	(India) Pusarla Venkata Sindhu	12	6
3	(Thailand) Ratchanok Inthanon	21	21
(Indonesia) Aprilla Yuswandari	18	18
2	(Germany) Juliane Schenk	21	21

Final
3	(Thailand) Ratchanok Inthanon	22	21
2	(Germany) Juliane Schenk	20	14

== Men's doubles ==
=== Seeds ===
1. (Denmark) Mathias Boe / Carsten Mogensen
2. (Malaysia) Koo Kien Keat / Tan Boon Heong
3. (South Korea) Ko Sung-hyun / Lee Yong-dae
4. (Japan) Hiroyuki Endo / Kenichi Hayakawa
5. (South Korea) Kim Ki-jung / Kim Sa-rang
6. (Indonesia) Mohammad Ahsan / Hendra Setiawan
7. (Malaysia) Hoon Thien How / Tan Wee Kiong
8. (China) Liu Xiaolong / Qiu Zihan

=== Top half ===
First round
1	(Denmark) M Boe (Denmark) C Mogensen	21	21
(India) K T Rupesh K (India) S Thomas	9	15
(Indonesia) R K Suwardi (Indonesia) M Ulinnuha	21	21
(India) S. Sanjeeth (India) J Yadav	6	13
8	(China) Liu XL (China) Qiu ZH	21	21
Q3	(United States) R Muradia (India) K Singh	14	11
PFQ	(India) K. Nandagopol (India) S. Sunjith	11	7
(India) M Attri (India) B S Reddy	21	21
4	(Japan) H Endo (Japan) K Hayakawa	21	21
Q1	(India) K Kumar B (India) A Raju M	6	5
(Japan) H Hashimoto (Japan) N Hirata	21	21
(India) M Gupta (India) G Venkat	11	18
7	(Malaysia) Hoon T H (Malaysia) Tan W K	21	21
(India) K Chahal (India) D Khatri	2	11
(Indonesia) A Pratama (Indonesia) R A Saputro	21	21
(India) M Behal (India) T Gill	11	17

Second round
1	(Denmark) M Boe (Denmark) C Mogensen	21	10	21
(Indonesia) R K Suwardi (Indonesia) M Ulinnuha	10	21	13
8	(China) Liu XL (China) Qiu ZH	21	21
(India) M Attri (India) B S Reddy	8	13
4	(Japan) H Endo (Japan) K Hayakawa	22	19	21
(Japan) H Hashimoto (Japan) N Hirata	20	21	13
7	(Malaysia) Hoon T H (Malaysia) Tan W K	12	12
(Indonesia) A Pratama (Indonesia) R A Saputro	21	21

Quarterfinals
1	(Denmark) M Boe (Denmark) C Mogensen	19	19
8	(China) Liu XL (China) Qiu ZH	21	21
4	(Japan) H Endo (Japan) K Hayakawa	22	21	16
(Indonesia) A Pratama (Indonesia) R A Saputro	24	19	21

Semifinals
8	(China) Liu XL (China) Qiu ZH	22	21
(Indonesia) A Pratama (Indonesia) R A Saputro	20	19

=== Bottom half ===
First round
(Thailand) M Jongjit (Thailand) N Puangpuapech	21	21
(India) K Tarun (India) A Vishnu	17	11
(England) C Adcock (England) A Ellis	21	21
PFQ	(India) S Nandaluri (India) P V K Reddy	8	14
Q2	(India) K C Reddy (India) S Ravuri	8	14
(India) P J Chopra (India) A Dewalker	21	21
(Indonesia) Y S Dasuki (Indonesia) H A Gunawan
3	(South Korea) Ko S-h (South Korea) Lee Y-d	w	/	o
(Japan) T Kamura (Japan) K Sonoda	21	21
(India) A Francis (India) Diju V.	18	14
(England) C Langridge (England) P Mills
5	(South Korea) Kim K-j (South Korea) Kim S-r	w	/	o
Q4	(India) R Surender (India) N Vashist	17	21	21
(India) J James (India) K. Dilshad	21	18	16
(Thailand) S Anugritayawon (Thailand) P Pisit	15	18
2	(Malaysia) Koo K K (Malaysia) Tan B H	21	21

Second round
(Thailand) M Jongjit (Thailand) N Puangpuapech	16	21	21
(England) C Adcock (England) A Ellis	21	13	19
(India) P J Chopra (India) A Dewalker	17	12
3	(South Korea) Ko S-h (South Korea) Lee Y-d	21	21
(Japan) T Kamura (Japan) K Sonoda	14	8
5	(South Korea) Kim K-j (South Korea) Kim S-r	21	21
Q1	(India) S Rathee (India) N Vashist	13	8
2	(Malaysia) Koo K K (Malaysia) Tan B H	21	21

Quarterfinals
(Thailand) M Jongjit (Thailand) N Puangpuapech	20	19
3	(South Korea) Ko S-h (South Korea) Lee Y-d	22	21
5	(South Korea) Kim K-j (South Korea) Kim S-r	21	21
2	(Malaysia) Koo K K (Malaysia) Tan B H	19	14

Semifinals
3	(South Korea) Ko S-h (South Korea) Lee Y-d	21	21
5	(South Korea) Kim K-j (South Korea) Kim S-r	11	13

=== Finals ===
Semifinals
8	(China) Liu Xiaolong (China) Qiu Zihan	22	21
(Indonesia) Angga Pratama (Indonesia) Rian Agung Saputro	20	19
3	(South Korea) Ko Sung-hyun (South Korea) Lee Yong-dae	21	21
5	(South Korea) Kim Ki-jung (South Korea) Kim Sa-rang	11	13

Final
8	(China) Liu Xiaolong (China) Qiu Zihan	22	21
3	(South Korea) Ko Sung-hyun (South Korea) Lee Yong-dae	20	18

== Women's doubles ==
=== Seeds ===
1. (Japan) Misaki Matsutomo / Ayaka Takahashi
2. (Denmark) Christinna Pedersen / Kamilla Rytter Juhl(Runner Up)
3. (South Korea) Jung Kyung-eun / Kim Ha-na
4. (Japan) Miyuki Maeda / Satoko Suetsuna(champion)
5. (Thailand) Duanganong Aroonkesorn / Kunchala Voravichitchaikul
6. (Hong Kong) Poon Lok Yan / Tse Ying Suet
7. (Thailand) Narissapat Lam / Saralee Thoungthongkam
8. (Indonesia) Anneke Feinya Agustin / Nitya Krishinda Maheswari

=== Top half ===
First round
(England) L Smith (England) G White	21	20	11
(India) P Gadre (India) A Ponnappa	19	22	21
8	(Indonesia) A F Agustin (Indonesia) N K Maheswari	w	d	n
(England) H Olver (England) K Robertshaw
(Indonesia) G R Imawan (Indonesia) T R Nuraidah
(Malaysia) Hoo V K M (Malaysia) Woon K W	w	d	n
(India) J Gutta (India) P Sawant	19	10
(Japan) M Aratama (Japan) M Taruno	21	21
5	(Thailand) D Aroonkesorn (Thailand) K Voravichitchaikul	21	22
(India) S Ghorpade (India) K. Maneesha	9	20
(Japan) Y Fukushima (Japan) R Kakiiwa	21	21
(India) A Balan (India) N. S Reddy	17	14

Second round
1	(Japan) M Matsutomo (Japan) A Takahashi	21	20	21
(India) P Gadre (India) A Ponnappa	14	22	12
(England) H Olver (England) K Robertshaw	20	18
(Indonesia) G R Imawan (Indonesia) T R Nuraidah	22	21
4	(Japan) M Maeda (Japan) S Suetsuna	21	21
(Japan) M Aratama (Japan) M Taruno	11	16
5	(Thailand) D Aroonkesorn (Thailand) K Voravichitchaikul	21	19	21
(Japan) Y Fukushima (Japan) Reika Kakiiwa	12	21	16

Quarterfinals
1	(Japan) M Matsutomo (Japan) A Takahashi	21	21
(Indonesia) G R Imawan (Indonesia) T R Nuraidah	17	15
4	(Japan) M Maeda (Japan) S Suetsuna	21	29
5	(Thailand) D Aroonkesorn (Thailand) K Voravichitchaikul	13	27

Semifinals
1	(Japan) M Matsutomo (Japan) A Takahashi	16	14
4	(Japan) M Maeda (Japan) S Suetsuna	21	21

=== Bottom half ===
First round
(South Korea) Jang Y-n (South Korea) Kim So-yeong	21	21
(India) D Gautam (India) E Kalia	3	3
(India) J R Rachapalli (India) L L Rachapalli	8	10
7	(Thailand) N Lam (Thailand) S Thoungthongkam	21	21
(Russia) T Bibik (Russia) A Chervaikova	21	21
(India) V V Belawadi (India) G M Nischitha	5	11
(India) K Das (India) J A Kowsar	2	2
3	(South Korea) Jung K-e (South Korea) Kim H-n	21	21
(Japan) N Fukuman (Japan) K Yonao	13	13
(South Korea) Lee S-h (South Korea) Shin S-c	21	21
(India) J Nashier (India) J Nashier	4	8
6	(Hong Kong) Pook L Y (Hong Kong) Tse Y S	21	21
(Indonesia) S R Andini (Indonesia) D D Haris	21	21
(India) G R Shivani (India) J. Meghana	10	9

Second round
(South Korea) Jang Y-n (South Korea) Kim S-y	22	21
7	(Thailand) N Lam (Thailand) S Thoungthongkam	20	12
(Russia) T Bibik (Russia) A Chervaikova	8	9
3	(South Korea) Jung K-e (South Korea) Kim H-n	21	21
(South Korea) Lee S-h (South Korea) Shin S-c	21	18	18
6	(Hong Kong) Poon L Y (Hong Kong) Tse Y S	19	21	21
(Indonesia) A R Andini (Indonesia) D D Haris	17	12
2	(Denmark) C Pedersen (Denmark) K Rytter Juhl	21	21

Quarterfinals
(South Korea) Jang Y-n (South Korea) Kim S-y	21	17	21
3	(South Korea) Jung K-e (South Korea) Kim H-n	16	21	17
6	(Hong Kong) Poon L Y (Hong Kong) Tse Y S	9	21	18
2	(Denmark) C Pedersen (Denmark) K Rytter Juhl	21	19	21

Semifinals
(South Korea) Jang Y-n (South Korea) Kim S-y	18	12
2	(Denmark) C Pedersen (Denmark) K Rytter Juhl	21	21

=== Finals ===
Semifinals
1	(Japan) Misaki Matsutomo (Japan) Ayaka Takahashi	16	14
4	(Japan) Miyuki Maeda (Japan) Satoko Suetsuna	21	21
(South Korea) Jang Ye-na (South Korea) Kim So-young	18	12
2	(Denmark) Christinna Pedersen (Denmark) Kamilla Rytter Juhl	21	21

Final
4	(Japan) Miyuki Maeda (Japan) Satoko Suetsuna	12	23	21
2	(Denmark) Christinna Pedersen (Denmark) Kamilla Rytter Juhl	21	21	18

== Mixed doubles ==
=== Seeds ===
1. (Indonesia) Tantowi Ahmad / Lilyana Natsir (champion)
2. (Denmark) Joachim Fischer Nielsen / Christinna Pedersen
3. (Malaysia) Chan Peng Soon / Goh Liu Ying
4. (Thailand) Sudket Prapakamol / Saralee Thoungthongkam
5. (Poland) Robert Mateusiak / Nadiezda Zieba
6. (Indonesia) Muhammad Rijal / Debby Susanto
7. (Indonesia) Fran Kurniawan / Shendy Puspa Irawati
8. (England) Chris Adcock / Gabrielle White

=== Top half ===
First round
(India) A Prakash (India) K Das
(Russia) I Sozonov (Russia) T Bibik	w	d	n
6	(Indonesia) M Rijal (Indonesia) D Susanto	w	d	n
(India) G Venkat (India) J Dewangan
(South Korea) Shin B-c (South Korea) Jang Y-n	22	21
(India) K. Nandagopal (India) J. Meghana	20	14
(Japan) H Hashimoto (Japan) M Maeda	21	21
(India) M Attri (India) S Ghorpade	14	15
5	(Poland) R Mateusiak (Poland) N Zieba	21	21
(India) H Malik (India) E Kalia	5	10
(India) A Dewalker (India) P Gadre	16	22	21
(England) A Ellis (England) L Smith	21	20	19

Second round
1	(Indonesia) T Ahmad (Indonesia) L Natsir	21	21
(India) A Prakash (India) K Das	4	10
(India) G Venkat (India) J Dewangan	9	12
(South Korea) Shin B-c (South Korea) Jang Y-n	21	21
3	(Malaysia) Chan P S (Malaysia) Goh L Y	19	21	23
(Japan) H Hashimoto (Japan) M Maeda	21	10	21
5	(Poland) R Mateusiak (Poland) N Zieba	21	21
(India) A Dewalker (India) P Gadre	16	17

Quarterfinals
1	(Indonesia) T Ahmad (Indonesia) L Natsir	21	21
(South Korea) Shin B-c (South Korea) Jang Y-n	18	16
3	(Malaysia) Chan P S (Malaysia) Goh L Y	13	18
5	(Poland) R Mateusiak (Poland) N Zieba	21	21

Semifinals
1	(Indonesia) T Ahmad (Indonesia) L Natsir	21	21
5	(Poland) R Mateusiak (Poland) N Zieba	5	10

=== Bottom half ===
First round
(Japan) K Hayakawa (Japan) M Matsutomo	21	21
(India) A Manota (India) R Sachdev	6	8
(India) A Vishnu (India) A Balan	15	16
8	(England) C Adcock (England) G White	21	21
(England) C Langridge (England) H Olver	21	15	16
(India) Diju V. (India) J Gutta	19	21	21
(Thailand) S Anugritayawon (Thailand) K Voravichitchaikul	19	21	21
(India) P J Chopra (India) K. Maneesha	21	19	16
(Denmark) M Pieler Kolding (Denmark) K Rytter Juhl	16	19
7	(Indonesia) F Kurniawan (Indonesia) S P Irawati	21	21
(South Korea) Ko S-h (South Korea) Kim H-n	21	23	21
(India) K Tarun (India) A Ponnappa	16	25	19

Second round
(Japan) K Hayakawa (Japan) M Matsutomo	10	21	13
8	(England) C Adcock (England) G White	21	11	21
(India) Diju V. (India) J Gutta	17	10
4	(Thailand) S Prapakamol (Thailand) S Thoungthongkam	21	21
(Thailand) S Anugritayawon (Thailand) K Voravichitchaikul	13	14
7	(Indonesia) F Kurniawan (Indonesia) S P Irawati	21	21
(South Korea) Ko S-h (South Korea) Kim H-n	22	23
2	(Denmark) J Fischer Nielsen (Denmark) C Pedersen	20	21

Quarterfinals
8	(England) C Adcock (England) G White	19	21	21
4	(Thailand) S Prapakamol (Thailand) S Thoungthongkam	21	11	15
7	(Indonesia) F Kurniawan (Indonesia) S P Irawati	21	19	12
(South Korea) Ko S-h (South Korea) Kim H-n	19	21	21

Semifinals
8	(England) C Adcock (England) G White	14	21	17
(South Korea) Ko S-h (South Korea) Kim H-n	21	12	21

=== Finals ===
Semifinals
1	(Indonesia) Tantowi Ahmad (Indonesia) Lilyana Natsir	21	21
5	(Poland) Robert Mateusiak (Poland) Nadiezda Zieba	5	10
8	(England) Chris Adcock (England) Gabrielle White	14	21	17
(South Korea) Ko Sung-hyun (South Korea) Kim Ha-na	21	12	21

Final
1	(Indonesia) Tantowi Ahmad (Indonesia) Lilyana Natsir	21	21
(South Korea) Ko Sung-hyun (South Korea) Kim Ha-na	16	13

Preceded by 2012 India Super Series	India Open	Succeeded by 2014 India Super Series
Preceded by 2013 All England Super Series Premier	BWF Super Series; 2013 season	Succeeded by 2013 Indonesia Super Series Premier
