= S. M. Arif =

Indian badminton coach

S. M. Arif Sahaab
- Born: 29 January 1944 (age 82); Hyderabad
- Occupation: Badminton Coach

Syed Mohammed Arif (born 29 January 1944), popularly known as Arif Saahab, is an Indian badminton coach. He is a recipient of Dronacharya Award and Padma Shri Award by the Government of India.

== Early life ==
S. M. Arif is from Hyderabad, Telangana. He received his B.Sc. from University of Hyderabad. He also played cricket at School, led Anwar ul Uloom college for four years and played for Deccan Blues in the HCA league. He quit after being sidelined by his cricket coach and pursued badminton.

== Career ==
S. M. Arif, during his college days, won the inter-varsity badminton championship by representing University of Hyderabad. He also represented Andhra Pradesh in several national tournaments.

He earned a diploma in badminton coaching from National Institute of Sports at Patiala. In 1974, he joined the national panel of coaches for badminton and in 1997 he was appointed as the National Chief Badminton Coach. Arif coached several Indian badminton players, including the former All England Badminton Champion Pullela Gopichand, the former Indian National Badminton champions P. V. V. Lakshmi, Jwala Gutta, and Saina Nehwal.

== Awards ==
- Dronacharya Award, Government India for his contribution to Indian Badminton - 2000.
- Meritorious certificate award, Badminton World Federation
- Padma Shri - 2012
