= 2011 BWF World Championships =

Tournament details
- Dates: 8 August – 14 August
- Edition: 19th
- Level: International
- Competitors: 347 from 48 nations
- Venue: Wembley Arena
- Location: London, England

Champions
- Men's singles: (China) Lin Dan
- Women's singles: (China) Wang Yihan
- Men's doubles: (China) Cai Yun (China) Fu Haifeng
- Women's doubles: (China) Wang Xiaoli (China) Yu Yang
- Mixed doubles: (China) Zhang Nan (China) Zhao Yunlei

The 2011 BWF World Championships was the 19th tournament of the World Badminton Championships, a global tournament in the sport of badminton. It was held at Wembley Arena in London, England, from August 8 to August 14, 2011.

China clean swept all the titles for a record third time and became the first nation to successfully defend all the titles won from the previous edition. Scotland won their first medal from mixed pair and India won their medal in women's doubles and their seconds worlds medal after 28 years.

== Draw ==
The draw was held on 25 July at Kuala Lumpur, Malaysia.

== Schedule ==
All five events started on the first day and concluded with the final on the last day.

All times are local (UTC+1).

Date	Time	Round
8 August 2011	10:00	Round of 64
9 August 2011	11:00	Round of 64
9 August 2011	11:00	Round of 32
10 August 2011	11:00	Round of 32
11 August 2011	11:00	Round of 16
12 August 2011	11:00	Quarterfinals
12 August 2011	17:00	Quarterfinals
13 August 2011	11:00	Semifinals
13 August 2011	17:30	Semifinals
14 August 2011	12:00	Finals

== Medalists ==
=== Medal table ===
* Host nation (England)

Rank	Nation	Gold	Silver	Bronze	Total
1	China	5	1	3	9
2	South Korea	0	1	1	2
3	Chinese Taipei	0	1	0	1
3	Malaysia	0	1	0	1
5	England*	0	0.5	0	0.5
5	Scotland	0	0.5	0	0.5
7	Indonesia	0	0	2	2
8	Denmark	0	0	1	1
8	Germany	0	0	1	1
8	India	0	0	1	1
8	Japan	0	0	1	1
Totals (11 entries)		5	5	10	20

=== Events ===
Event	Gold	Silver	Bronze
Men's singles	Lin Dan; China	Lee Chong Wei; Malaysia	Chen Jin; China
Men's singles	Lin Dan; China	Lee Chong Wei; Malaysia	Peter Gade; Denmark
Women's singles	Wang Yihan; China	Cheng Shao-chieh; Chinese Taipei	Juliane Schenk; Germany
Women's singles	Wang Yihan; China	Cheng Shao-chieh; Chinese Taipei	Wang Xin; China
Men's doubles	China; Cai Yun; Fu Haifeng	South Korea; Ko Sung-hyun; Yoo Yeon-seong	South Korea; Jung Jae-sung; Lee Yong-dae
Men's doubles	China; Cai Yun; Fu Haifeng	South Korea; Ko Sung-hyun; Yoo Yeon-seong	Indonesia; Mohammad Ahsan; Bona Septano
Women's doubles	China; Wang Xiaoli; Yu Yang	China; Tian Qing; Zhao Yunlei	Japan; Miyuki Maeda; Satoko Suetsuna
Women's doubles	China; Wang Xiaoli; Yu Yang	China; Tian Qing; Zhao Yunlei	India; Jwala Gutta; Ashwini Ponnappa
Mixed doubles	China; Zhang Nan; Zhao Yunlei	England; Chris Adcock; Scotland; Imogen Bankier	China; Xu Chen; Ma Jin
Mixed doubles	China; Zhang Nan; Zhao Yunlei	England; Chris Adcock; Scotland; Imogen Bankier	Indonesia; Tontowi Ahmad; Lilyana Natsir

== Participating countries ==
347 players from 48 countries participated at this year's edition. The number in parentheses indicate the player contributed by each country.

- Australia (4)
- Austria (4)
- Belarus (2)
- Belgium (8)
- Brazil (2)
- Bulgaria (4)
- Canada (10)
- China (24)
- Chinese Taipei (14)
- Croatia (3)
- Czech Republic (2)
- Denmark (16)
- England (18)
- Finland (2)
- France (7)
- Germany (12)
- Guatemala (1)
- Hong Kong (8)
- India (12)
- Indonesia (24)
- Ireland (4)
- Israel (1)
- Italy (1)
- Japan (24)
- Lithuania (1)
- Malaysia (15)
- Mexico (3)
- Morocco (1)
- Netherlands (14)
- New Zealand (1)
- Peru (3)
- Poland (8)
- Russia (11)
- Scotland (5)
- Singapore (9)
- Slovakia (1)
- Slovenia (1)
- South Africa (5)
- South Korea (13)
- Spain (4)
- Sri Lanka (2)
- Sweden (5)
- Switzerland (3)
- Thailand (10)
- Turkey (4)
- Ukraine (8)
- United States (9)
- Vietnam (1)
