= Satoko Suetsuna =

Japanese badminton player

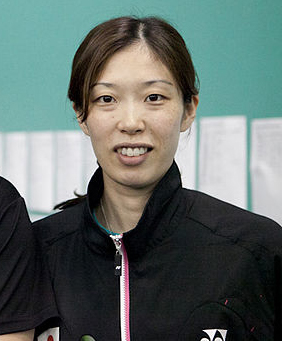

Personal information
- Born: 30 January 1981 (age 45) Ōita, Ōita Prefecture, Japan
- Height: 1.68 m (5 ft 6 in)
- Weight: 60 kg (132 lb)

Sport
- Country: Japan
- Sport: Badminton

Women's doubles
- Highest ranking: 2 (with Miyuki Maeda, 11 November 2010)
- BWF profile
Medal record
Women's Badminton
Representing Japan
World Championships
Bronze medal – third place	2011 London	Women's doubles
Uber Cup
Bronze medal – third place	2010 Kuala Lumpur	Women's team
Asian Games
Silver medal – second place	2006 Doha	Women's team

Satoko Suetsuna (末綱 聡子, Suetsuna Satoko; born 30 January 1981) is a badminton player from Japan. Born in Ōita, Ōita Prefecture, she joined Renesas badminton club and later affiliated with Saishunkan team. She was a bronze medalist at the 2011 BWF World Championships with her partner Miyuki Maeda.

== Career ==
Suetsuna has gained prominence in badminton through her success in women's doubles with her partner Miyuki Maeda, and the partnerships known by the Japanese media as "Suemae". Together they won the 2010 Denmark Open, their first major tournament victory. They went on to win the 2011 Malaysia Grand Prix Gold and the 2011 India Open. Suetsuna and Maeda also have two bronze medals from major competitions from making the semifinals at the 2011 London World Championships and 2010 Uber Cup in Kuala Lumpur. She competed at the 2006 and 2010 Asian Games as well in 2008 and 2012 Olympic Games. In 2008 Beijing Olympics, with her women's doubles partner Maeda, they finished fourth, the 2nd best performance to date by Japanese badminton players at the Olympics.

Satoko Suetsuna has competed with several men in mixed doubles, but has not achieved the same level of success as she has in her main event.

Suetsuna retired from the Japan team in September 2013.

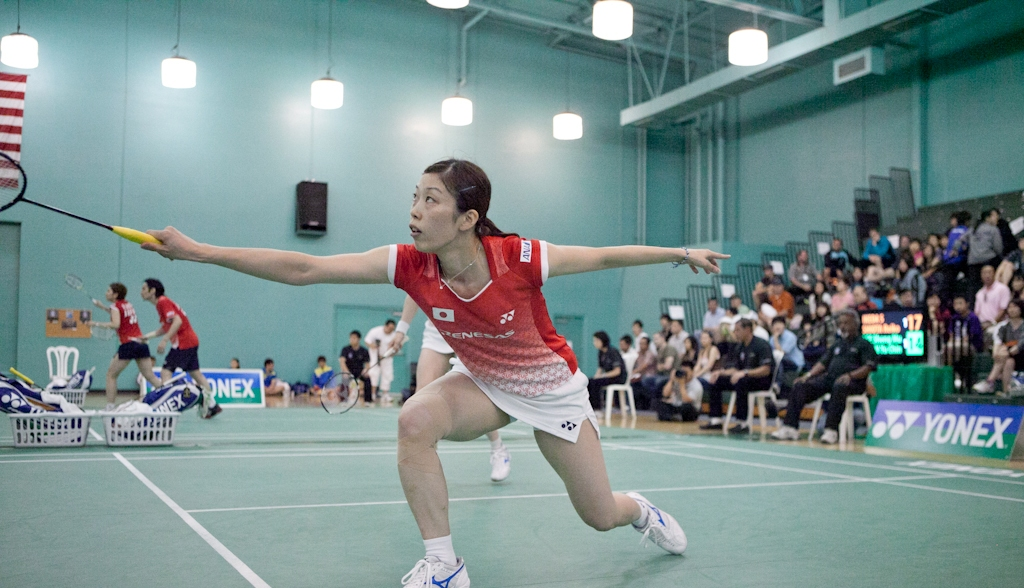
Suetsuna participated at the 2011 U.S. Open

== Achievements ==
=== BWF World Championships ===
Women's doubles
Year	Venue	Partner	Opponent	Score	Result
2011	Wembley Arena; London, England	(Japan) Miyuki Maeda	(China) Wang Xiaoli (China) Yu Yang	8–21, 15–21	Bronze

=== BWF Superseries ===
The BWF Superseries, which was launched on 14 December 2006 and implemented in 2007, is a series of elite badminton tournaments, sanctioned by the Badminton World Federation (BWF). BWF Superseries levels are Superseries and Superseries Premier. A season of Superseries consists of twelve tournaments around the world that have been introduced since 2011. Successful players are invited to the Superseries Finals, which are held at the end of each year.

Women's doubles
Year	Tournament	Partner	Opponent	Score	Result	Ref.
2008	Indonesia Open	(Japan) Miyuki Maeda	(Indonesia) Vita Marissa (Indonesia) Liliyana Natsir	15–21, 14–21	(silver) Runner-up	
2009	Japan Open	(Japan) Miyuki Maeda	(China) Ma Jin (China) Wang Xiaoli	19–21, 18–21	(silver) Runner-up	
2010	Swiss Open	(Japan) Miyuki Maeda	(China) Tian Qing (China) Yu Yang	16–21, 13–21	(silver) Runner-up	
2010	Denmark Open	(Japan) Miyuki Maeda	(Japan) Shizuka Matsuo (Japan) Mami Naito	21–17, 21–14	(gold) Winner	
2011	India Open	(Japan) Miyuki Maeda	(Japan) Mizuki Fujii (Japan) Reika Kakiiwa	26–24, 21–15	(gold) Winner	
2012	China Open	(Japan) Miyuki Maeda	(China) Wang Xiaoli (China) Yu Yang	19–21, 7–14 retired	(silver) Runner-up	
2013	India Open	(Japan) Miyuki Maeda	(Denmark) Christinna Pedersen (Denmark) Kamilla Rytter Juhl	12–21, 23–21, 21–18	(gold) Winner	

BWF Super Series Premier tournament
BWF Super Series tournament

=== BWF Grand Prix ===
The BWF Grand Prix had two levels, the BWF Grand Prix and Grand Prix Gold. It was a series of badminton tournaments sanctioned by the Badminton World Federation (BWF) which was held from 2007 to 2017.

Women's doubles
Year	Tournament	Partner	Opponent	Score	Result	Ref.
2007	U.S. Open	(Japan) Miyuki Maeda	(Japan) Aki Akao (Japan) Tomomi Matsuda	16–21, 21–14, 21–15	(gold) Winner	
2008	German Open	(Japan) Miyuki Maeda	(South Korea) Lee Hyo-jung (South Korea) Lee Kyung-won	17–21, 16–21	(silver) Runner-up	
2008	India Open	(Japan) Miyuki Maeda	(Chinese Taipei) Cheng Wen-hsing (Chinese Taipei) Chien Yu-chin	17–21, 16–21	(silver) Runner-up	
2011	Malaysia Grand Prix Gold	(Japan) Miyuki Maeda	(Japan) Shizuka Matsuo (Japan) Mami Naito	21–18, 21–13	(gold) Winner	
2011	India Grand Prix Gold	(Japan) Miyuki Maeda	(Singapore) Shinta Mulia Sari (Singapore) Yao Lei	17–21, 18–21	(silver) Runner-up	

BWF Grand Prix Gold tournament
BWF Grand Prix tournament

== Record against selected opponents ==
Record against year-end Finals finalists, World Championships semi-finalists, and Olympic quarter-finalists.

=== Miyuki Maeda ===
- (Australia) Leanne Choo & Renuga Veeran 2–0
- (Canada) Alex Bruce & Michelle Li 1–0
- (China) Cheng Shu & Zhao Yunlei 0–2
- (China) Du Jing & Yu Yang 0–5
- (China) Gao Ling & Huang Sui 0–1
- (China) Ma Jin & Wang Xiaoli 0–1
- (China) Tian Qing & Zhao Yunlei 0–3
- (China) Wang Xiaoli & Yu Yang 0–5
- (China) Wei Yili & Zhang Yawen 0–2
- (China) Wei Yili & Zhao Tingting 0–2
- (China) Yang Wei & Zhang Jiewen 1–2
- (Chinese Taipei) Cheng Wen-hsing & Chien Yu-chin 1–11
- (Denmark) Christinna Pedersen & Kamilla Rytter Juhl 2–3
- (India) Jwala Gutta & Ashwini Ponnappa 4–1
- (Indonesia) Vita Marissa & Liliyana Natsir 1–2
- (Indonesia) Nitya Krishinda Maheswari & Greysia Polii 1–2
- (Japan) Mizuki Fujii & Reika Kakiiwa 2–0
- (Japan) Kumiko Ogura & Reiko Shiota 0–2
- (Japan) Misaki Matsutomo & Ayaka Takahashi 2–1
- (Malaysia) Chin Eei Hui & Wong Pei Tty 4–4
- (Russia) Valeria Sorokina & Nina Vislova 5–0
- (Singapore) Jiang Yanmei & Li Yujia 0–3
- (South Korea) Lee Hyo-jung & Lee Kyung-won 0–7
