= Miyuki Maeda =

Japanese badminton player

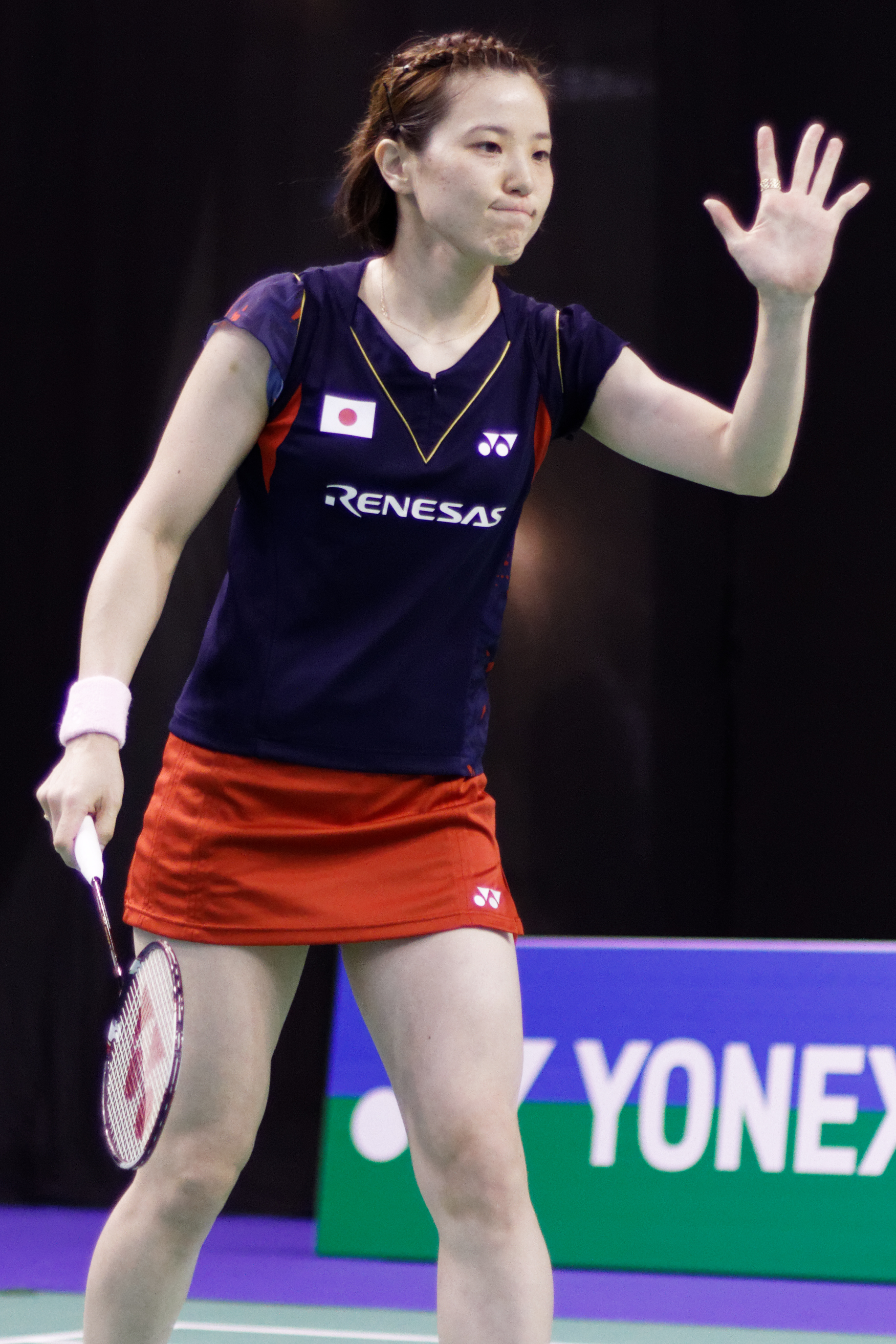
- Miyuki Maeda at the 2013 French Super Series.

Personal information
- Born: 14 October 1985 (age 41) Kirishima, Kagoshima, Japan
- Height: 1.69 m (5 ft 7 in)
- Weight: 62 kg (137 lb)

Sport
- Country: Japan
- Sport: Badminton
- Handedness: Right

Women's & mixed doubles
- Highest ranking: 2 (WD with Satoko Suetsuna, 11 November 2010); 20 (XD with Hirokatsu Hashimoto, 6 March 2014)
- BWF profile
Medal record
Women's badminton
Representing Japan
World Championships
| Bronze medal – third place | 2011 London | Women's doubles |
| Bronze medal – third place | 2014 Copenhagen | Women's doubles |
Sudirman Cup
| Silver medal – second place | 2015 Dongguan | Mixed team |
Uber Cup
| Silver medal – second place | 2014 New Delhi | Women's team |
| Bronze medal – third place | 2010 Kuala Lumpur | Women's team |
Asian Games
| Silver medal – second place | 2006 Doha | Women's team |
| Bronze medal – third place | 2014 Incheon | Women's team |
Asian Championships
| Bronze medal – third place | 2009 Suwon | Mixed doubles |

For the wrestler, see Miyuki Maeda.

Miyuki Maeda (前田 美順, Maeda Miyuki; born 14 October 1985) is a Japanese international badminton player from the Renesas badminton club and later affiliated with Saishunkan team. She participated at the 2008 and 2012 Olympic Games, and also in three Asian Games editions from 2006 to 2014.

== Career ==
Maeda's first major success was at the 2008 Beijing Olympic Games. With her women's doubles partner Satoko Suetsuna they finished fourth, the 2nd best performance to date by Japanese badminton players at the Olympics. The two have continued to compete together after the Olympics and have maintained a top six ranking since March 2010. On the national level they won their first doubles title in 2010.

In the mixed doubles Maeda competed with Noriyasu Hirata, winning the national championships in 2009 and 2010.

== Awards ==
In 2010, she received the Valuable Player Award with her partner Satoko Suetsuna at the 2010 Badminton Nihon League.

== Achievements ==
=== World Championships ===
Women's doubles
| Year | Venue | Partner | Opponent | Score | Result | Ref. |
|---|---|---|---|---|---|---|
| 2011 | Wembley Arena; London, England | (Japan) Satoko Suetsuna | (China) Wang Xiaoli (China) Yu Yang | 8–21, 15–21 | Bronze | |
| 2014 | Ballerup Super Arena; Copenhagen, Denmark | (Japan) Reika Kakiiwa | (China) Wang Xiaoli (China) Yu Yang | 8–21, 13–21 | Bronze | |

=== Asian Championships ===
Mixed doubles
| Year | Venue | Partner | Opponent | Score | Result | Ref. |
|---|---|---|---|---|---|---|
| 2009 | Suwon Indoor Stadium; Suwon, South Korea | (Japan) Noriyasu Hirata | (South Korea) Yoo Yeon-seong (South Korea) Kim Min-jung | 15–21, 15–21 | Bronze | |

=== BWF Superseries ===
The BWF Superseries, which was launched on 14 December 2006 and implemented in 2007, is a series of elite badminton tournaments, sanctioned by the Badminton World Federation (BWF). BWF Superseries levels are Superseries and Superseries Premier. A season of Superseries consists of twelve tournaments around the world that have been introduced since 2011. Successful players are invited to the Superseries Finals, which are held at the end of each year.

Women's doubles
| Year | Tournament | Partner | Opponent | Score | Result | Ref. |
|---|---|---|---|---|---|---|
| 2008 | Indonesia Open | (Japan) Satoko Suetsuna | (Indonesia) Vita Marissa (Indonesia) Liliyana Natsir | 15–21, 14–21 | (silver) Runner-up | |
| 2009 | Japan Open | (Japan) Satoko Suetsuna | (China) Ma Jin (China) Wang Xiaoli | 19–21, 18–21 | (silver) Runner-up | |
| 2010 | Swiss Open | (Japan) Satoko Suetsuna | (China) Tian Qing (China) Yu Yang | 16–21, 13–21 | (silver) Runner-up | |
| 2010 | Denmark Open | (Japan) Satoko Suetsuna | (Japan) Shizuka Matsuo (Japan) Mami Naito | 21–17, 21–14 | (gold) Winner | |
| 2011 | India Open | (Japan) Satoko Suetsuna | (Japan) Mizuki Fujii (Japan) Reika Kakiiwa | 26–24, 21–15 | (gold) Winner | |
| 2012 | China Open | (Japan) Satoko Suetsuna | (China) Wang Xiaoli (China) Yu Yang | 19–21, 7–14 retired | (silver) Runner-up | |
| 2013 | India Open | (Japan) Satoko Suetsuna | (Denmark) Christinna Pedersen (Denmark) Kamilla Rytter Juhl | 12–21, 23–21, 21–18 | (gold) Winner | |
| 2014 | Japan Open | (Japan) Reika Kakiiwa | (Japan) Misaki Matsutomo (Japan) Ayaka Takahashi | 13–21, 17–21 | (silver) Runner-up | |

BWF Super Series Premier tournament
BWF Super Series tournament

=== BWF Grand Prix ===
The BWF Grand Prix had two levels, the BWF Grand Prix and Grand Prix Gold. It was a series of badminton tournaments sanctioned by the Badminton World Federation (BWF) which was held from 2007 to 2017.

Women's doubles
| Year | Tournament | Partner | Opponent | Score | Result | Ref. |
|---|---|---|---|---|---|---|
| 2007 | U.S. Open | (Japan) Satoko Suetsuna | (Japan) Aki Akao (Japan) Tomomi Matsuda | 16–21, 21–14, 21–15 | (gold) Winner | |
| 2008 | German Open | (Japan) Satoko Suetsuna | (South Korea) Lee Hyo-jung (South Korea) Lee Kyung-won | 17–21, 16–21 | (silver) Runner-up | |
| 2008 | India Open | (Japan) Satoko Suetsuna | (Chinese Taipei) Cheng Wen-hsing (Chinese Taipei) Chien Yu-chin | 17–21, 16–21 | (silver) Runner-up | |
| 2011 | Malaysia Grand Prix Gold | (Japan) Satoko Suetsuna | (Japan) Shizuka Matsuo (Japan) Mami Naito | 21–18, 21–13 | (gold) Winner | |
| 2011 | India Grand Prix Gold | (Japan) Satoko Suetsuna | (Singapore) Shinta Mulia Sari (Singapore) Yao Lei | 17–21, 18–21 | (silver) Runner-up | |

Mixed doubles
| Year | Tournament | Partner | Opponent | Score | Result |
|---|---|---|---|---|---|
| 2007 | U.S. Open | (Japan) Keita Masuda | (United States) Howard Bach (United States) Eva Lee | 19–21, 21–11, 21–19 | (gold) Winner |

BWF Grand Prix Gold tournament
BWF Grand Prix tournament

=== BWF International Challenge/Series ===
Mixed doubles
| Year | Tournament | Partner | Opponent | Score | Result | Ref. |
|---|---|---|---|---|---|---|
| 2007 | Osaka International | (Japan) Keita Masuda | (South Korea) Cho Gun-woo (South Korea) Hong Soo-jung | 21–10, 21–9 | (gold) Winner | |

BWF International Challenge tournament

== Record against selected opponents ==
Record against year-end Finals finalists, World Championships semi-finalists, and Olympic quarter-finalists.

=== Satoko Suetsuna ===
- (Australia) Leanne Choo & Renuga Veeran 2–0
- (Canada) Alex Bruce & Michelle Li 1–0
- (China) Cheng Shu & Zhao Yunlei 0–2
- (China) Du Jing & Yu Yang 0–5
- (China) Gao Ling & Huang Sui 0–1
- (China) Ma Jin & Wang Xiaoli 0–1
- (China) Tian Qing & Zhao Yunlei 0–3
- (China) Wang Xiaoli & Yu Yang 0–5
- (China) Wei Yili & Zhang Yawen 0–2
- (China) Wei Yili & Zhao Tingting 0–2
- (China) Yang Wei & Zhang Jiewen 1–2
- (Chinese Taipei) Cheng Wen-hsing & Chien Yu-chin 1–11
- (Denmark) Christinna Pedersen & Kamilla Rytter Juhl 2–3
- (India) Jwala Gutta & Ashwini Ponnappa 4–1
- (Indonesia) Vita Marissa & Liliyana Natsir 1–2
- (Indonesia) Nitya Krishinda Maheswari & Greysia Polii 1–2
- (Japan) Mizuki Fujii & Reika Kakiiwa 2–0
- (Japan) Kumiko Ogura & Reiko Shiota 0–2
- (Japan) Misaki Matsutomo & Ayaka Takahashi 2–1
- (Malaysia) Chin Eei Hui & Wong Pei Tty 4–4
- (Russia) Valeria Sorokina & Nina Vislova 5–0
- (Singapore) Jiang Yanmei & Li Yujia 0–3
- (South Korea) Lee Hyo-jung & Lee Kyung-won 0–7
