= P. Jyotshna =

Indian badminton player (born 1988)

Personal information
- Born: Jyotshna Polavarapu; 22 December 1988 (age 37) India

Sport
- Country: India
- Sport: Badminton
- Handedness: Right

Women's & mixed doubles
- Highest ranking: 80 (WD 21 January 2010); 111 (XD 13 September 2012)
- BWF profile

Jyotshna Polavarapu (born 22 December 1988) is an Indian badminton player. She plays both doubles and mixed doubles. She partnered Pradnya Gadre earlier for women's doubles events. She was trained at the Gopichand Badminton Academy, and reached the women's doubles number 3 in the national ranking. She was the runners-up at the national championships in the mixed doubles event in 2006/07, and in the women's doubles in 2010/11.

== Achievements ==
=== BWF International Challenge/Series ===
Women's doubles

Year	Tournament	Partner	Opponent	Score	Result
2008	Nepal International	(India) Anjali Kalita	(India) Jwala Gutta (India) Shruti Kurien	6–21, 8–21	(silver) Runner-up
2007	India International	(India) Aparna Balan	(India) Jwala Gutta (India) Shruti Kurien	11–21, 8–21	(silver) Runner-up

BWF International Challenge tournament
BWF International Series tournament
