= Pradnya Gadre =

Indian badminton player (born 1990)

Personal information
- Born: Pradnya Gadre; 17 October 1990 (age 36) India

Sport
- Country: India
- Sport: Badminton
- Handedness: Right

Women's Doubles
- Highest ranking: 26 (9 Aug 2013)
- Current ranking: 29 (15 Aug 2013)
- BWF profile
Medal record
Uber Cup
Bronze medal – third place	2014 New Delhi	Team
Asian Games
Bronze medal – third place	2014 Incheon	Women's team

Pradnya Gadre (born 17 October 1990) is an Indian badminton player from Nashik, Maharashtra who currently plays doubles and mixed doubles. She partners Ashwini Ponnappa for women's doubles events. The other partners she earlier paired up for women's doubles are Jyotshna P, Prajakta Sawant, Nitya Sosale. She is married to Indian badminton player Pranav Chopra. For mixed doubles Events she partners with Akshay Dewalkar, earlier it was Pranaav Jerry Chopra. She is sponsored by Flypower-arbi sports.

== Achievements ==
=== BWF International Challenge/Series (7 titles, 2 runners-up) ===
Women's doubles
Year	Tournament	Partner	Opponent	Score	Result
2015	Lagos International	(India) N. Sikki Reddy	(Turkey) Özge Bayrak (Turkey) Neslihan Yiğit	21–19, 21–23, 21–15	(gold) Winner
2015	Polish Open	(India) N. Sikki Reddy	(Canada) Alexandra Bruce (Canada) Phyllis Chan	21–16, 21–18	(gold) Winner
2014	Bangladesh International	(India) N. Sikki Reddy	(Turkey) Özge Bayrak (Turkey) Neslihan Yiğit	21–10, 22–24, 21–16	(gold) Winner
2013	Bahrain International Challenge	(India) N. Sikki Reddy	(India) Aparna Balan (India) Sanyogita Ghorpade	21–13, 19–21, 21–5	(gold) Winner
2013	Tata Open India International	(India) N. Sikki Reddy	(India) Jwala Gutta (India) Ashwini Ponnappa	21–19, 21–19	(gold) Winner

Mixed doubles
Year	Tournament	Partner	Opponent	Score	Result
2015	Polish Open	(India) Akshay Dewalkar	(Malaysia) Chan Peng Soon (Malaysia) Goh Liu Ying	26–28, 18–21	(silver) Runner-up
2014	Tata Open India International	(India) Akshay Dewalkar	(India) Manu Attri (India) N. Sikki Reddy	19–21, 21–19, 10–21	(silver) Runner-up
2014	Sri Lanka International	(India) Akshay Dewalkar	(Malaysia) Vountus Indra Mawan (India) Prajakta Sawant	21–16, 21–18	(gold) Winner
2013	Tata Open India International	(India) Akshay Dewalkar	(India) Tarun Kona (India) Ashwini Ponnappa	21–17, 18–21, 21–18	(gold) Winner

BWF International Challenge tournament
BWF Future Series tournament

== See also ==
- Ashwini Ponnappa
