= Jwala Gutta =

Indian badminton player (born 1983)

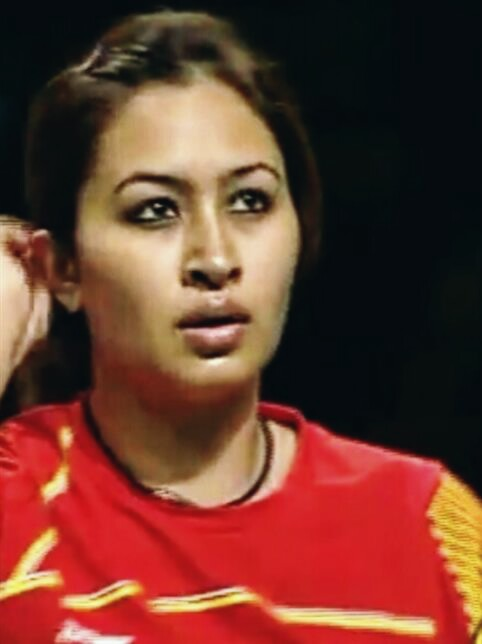
- Gutta in 2015

Personal information
- Born: 7 September 1983 (age 43) Wardha, Maharashtra, India
- Years active: 1999–2017
- Height: 1.78 m (5 ft 10 in)
- Weight: 75 kg (165 lb)

Sport
- Country: India
- Sport: Badminton
- Handedness: Left

Mixed Doubles/ Women's Doubles
- Highest ranking: 6 (XD August 2010); 10 (WD August 2015)
- BWF profile
Medal record
Women's badminton
Representing India
World Championships
Bronze medal – third place	2011 London	Women's doubles
Uber Cup
Bronze medal – third place	2014 New Delhi	Women's team
Bronze medal – third place	2016 Kunshan	Women's team
Commonwealth Games
Gold medal – first place	2010 Delhi	Women's doubles
Silver medal – second place	2010 Delhi	Mixed team
Silver medal – second place	2014 Glasgow	Women's doubles
Bronze medal – third place	2006 Melbourne	Mixed team
Asian Championships
Bronze medal – third place	2014 Gimcheon	Women's doubles
South Asian Games
Gold medal – first place	2004 Islamabad	Women's doubles
Gold medal – first place	2004 Islamabad	Mixed doubles
Gold medal – first place	2004 Islamabad	Women's team
Gold medal – first place	2006 Colombo	Women's doubles
Gold medal – first place	2006 Colombo	Mixed doubles
Gold medal – first place	2006 Colombo	Women's team
Gold medal – first place	2016 Guwahati-Shillong	Women's doubles
Gold medal – first place	2016 Guwahati-Shillong	Women's team

Jwala Gutta (Note: Telugu: గుత్తా జ్వాల, romanized: Guttā Jvāla; family names traditionally precede personal names in Telugu naming customs) (born 7 September 1983) is an Indian badminton player. Beginning in the late 1990s, she represented India at international events in both mixed and women's doubles formats. She has a total of 316 match wins in both the disciplines—the most by any Indian—and peaked at no. 6 in the world rankings. Gutta has won medals at numerous tournaments on the BWF circuit including a silver at the 2009 Superseries Masters Finals and a bronze at the 2011 World Championships.

Born in Wardha to a Chinese mother and a Telugu father, she began playing badminton at a young age. A fourteen-time National Champion, Gutta played with Shruti Kurien earlier in her career, but found greater international success with Ashwini Ponnappa. The pair consistently figured among the top-twenty in the BWF World Ranking reaching as high as no. 10 in 2015. Gutta is the first badminton player of Indian origin to qualify for two events in the Olympics–women's doubles with Ponnappa and mixed doubles with V. Diju at London. Gutta is known for her skilled left-handed stroke-play and is one of the very few doubles players to use a forehand service.

Gutta has won numerous medals for Indian badminton including the bronze medal 2011 BWF World Championships in London and a gold and silver at 2010 and 2014 Commonwealth Games respectively in the women's doubles event which were the first for the country in the discipline. Other achievements include the historic bronze medal at the 2014 Thomas & Uber Cup held in New Delhi, a bronze medal at Badminton Asia Championships in the same year and final and semi-final appearances in many big international events most notably the finals appearance at the 2009 BWF Super Series Masters Finals, alongside Diju which was the first for the country in any discipline.

Gutta has been credited with bringing recognition for doubles badminton in India, first with her mixed doubles partner Diju with whom she peaked at no. 6 in 2010 becoming the first doubles partnership from the country to be ranked among the top-10 and later with her partnership with Ponnappa in women's doubles matches. She paired with Ponappa at the Rio 2016 Olympics where the pair crashed out in the group stage with two consecutive losses at the hands of opponents from Japan and Netherlands. Gutta has won medals at all major international badminton tournaments and multi-sport events, except for the Olympics.

In addition to her badminton career, Gutta has been vocal about social issues she advocates for, ranging from fair treatment of women in sports, health and education, to women's empowerment and gender equality.

She has been listed several times among the most inspiring sportswomen of India. She was awarded the Arjuna Award, India's second highest sporting award, for her achievements. Gutta was married to badminton player Chetan Anand from 2005 to 2011. She told ESPN that she was contemplating retirement, after entering negotiations for a coaching role for BAI in May 2017.

== Early life and junior career ==
Jwala Gutta was born on 7 September 1983 in Wardha, Maharashtra and brought up in Hyderabad, Telangana, to a Chinese mother and a Telugu father. Jwala's father, Kranti Gutta, hailed from Andhra Pradesh's Guntur district and belonged to a family of freedom fighters and Leftists political thought. Her mother, Yelan Gutta, was born in China and is a granddaughter of a Gandhian named Zeng. Yelan first came to India in 1977 with her grandfather to visit the Sevagram ashram, where she translated Gandhi's autobiography and other works into the Chinese language. Gutta has a younger sister, Insi Gutta.

Initially inclined towards playing tennis, Gutta shifted to badminton at the insistence of her mother. She was introduced to the national badminton coach S. M. Arif, by her father at the age of four. Arif recommended her to learn gymnastics or swimming for a couple of years before starting training for badminton. Gutta later started training under Arif, at the Lal Bahadur Shastri Stadium.

Gutta started playing badminton at the age of six. Her chief achievement as a youngster was to win the Under-13 Girls Mini National Badminton Championship held at Thrissur, Kerala. In 2000, Gutta (aged 17) won the Junior National Badminton Championship. The same year, she also won the Women's Doubles Junior National Championship and the Senior National Badminton Championship, both in partnership with Shruti Kurien. This association was to last several years, and the pairing of Gutta and Shruti Kurien won the Women's Doubles National title for seven years in succession, from 2002 to 2008.

== Playing style ==
Gutta plays aggressively in the front court. She is considered dangerous in the front court. She also has a strong smash from the back court and often makes use of deceptive drops. Gutta is vulnerable in some areas of her game, most evidently in her movement across the court. She can commit certain unforced errors when forced to move out of her favoured positions. She has also had some fitness issues and injury troubles in her career. Gutta is also known for being one of the only top doubles player to still use the forehand service, since most other doubles specialists opt for the safer backhand serve. She stands unique in this aspect.

== Performance in women's doubles ==
=== Early years: 2002–09 ===
Gutta partnered Shruti Kurien-Kanetkar during the early part of her career for the women's doubles competition. The duo reached the semi-final round of their second international tournament itself, the India Asia Satellite tournament 2002. They also reached the semi-final round of the same tournament in the year 2004, and finished runner-up at the Le Volant d'Or Tournament, known as Toulouse Open the same year. Further, she reached the Final Rounds of the Scottish International tournament 2004 and 40th Portuguese Badminton Championship 2004. In the year 2006, she won the Sri Lanka International Satellite tournament; while in the year 2007, she won the Cyprus Badminton International tournament. The same year, she also won at the Pakistan International Challenge tournament and the Indian International Challenge tournament. Apart from these achievements, Gutta won the Nepal International Series tournament 2008 and Yonex Dutch Open Grand Prix 2008 in the Women's Doubles category.

=== 2010: Commonwealth Gold and breakthrough ===
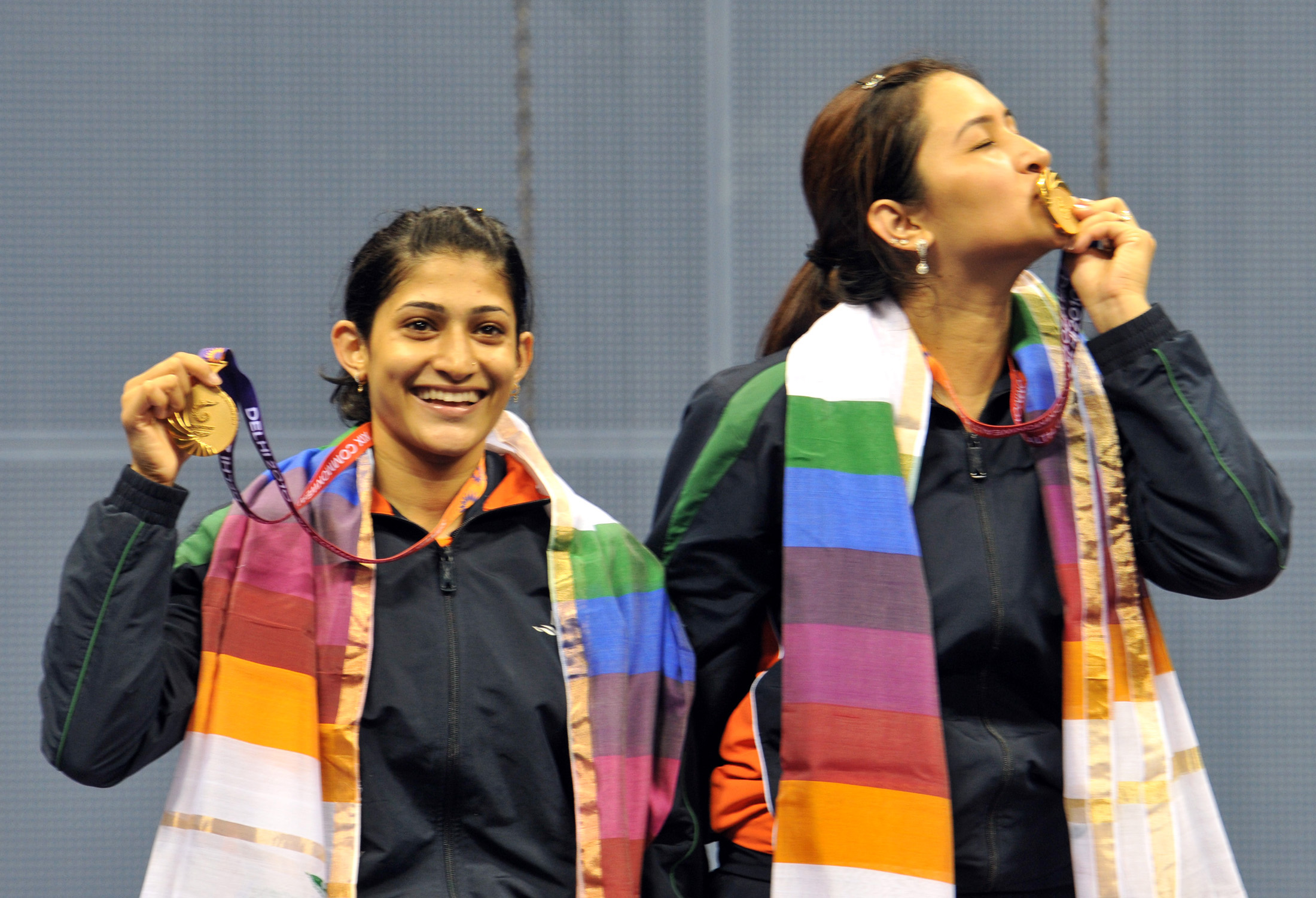
Gutta and Ashwini Ponnappa winning gold medal for India at Commonwealth Games 2010

Gutta then split with her longtime partner Shruti Kurien due to compatibility issues. She then paired up with young Ashwini Ponnappa from Bangalore who was called up for the national camp just before the Commonwealth Games. She and Ponnappa then went on to win the sensational gold medal in the women's doubles at the New Delhi Commonwealth Games making history of winning the first gold medal for India in the event. They beat much higher ranked Singaporean pair of Shinta Mulia Sari and Yao Lei in the finals 21–15, 21–19 in front of the cheering home crowd and set the stadium ablaze with their win. Gutta and Ponnappa then became household names after winning the medal in front of home crowd. Since, their Gold Medal effort at the games they brought women's doubles into limelight in the country.

After the win Gutta at a press conference stated, "It's unbelievable. I think it was long pending for me. I am quite emotional. The feeling is yet to sink in. Ashwini played exceptionally well and we hope to continue the good work, I want to dedicate the medal to my family who stood by me, my coaches, especially SM Arif, Atik Jauhari and all the team members, Gopi. I owe this medal to all who helped me," and added that "This medal will silence my critics. This is my answer to them to whatever happened. I am very happy and everyone who has negative thoughts about me, I would like to say just shut-up now,"

=== 2011: World Championships bronze ===
In 2011, they came up with one of their finest performances when the pair etched their names in history books becoming the first Indian pair to ensure a medal at the World Badminton Championships. The pair defeated 12th seeds Vita Marrisa and Nadya Melati of Indonesia 17–21, 21–10, 21–17 to storm into the women's doubles semifinal before losing out to the Chinese fifth seeds in the semi-finals in London, thereby winning a bronze in the Badminton World Championship. They had previously beaten Poon Lok Yan and Tse Ying Suet of Hong Kong 19–21, 21–17, 21–19 in Round of 16. Also, in the second round they had caused a big upset by beating the 2nd seeds and former World Num 1s. Cheng Wen-hsing Chien Yu-chin of Chinese Taipei 21–18 21–18. In a 2016 report published by Sportskeeda, the feat was ranked as the fifth greatest achievement of Indian badminton.

=== 2012: London Olympics ===
She played women's doubles as well as mixed doubles at the 2012 London Olympics becoming the first and the only Indian to qualify in two events in the entire history of the game. Gutta pairing with Ashwini Ponappa lost their opening women's doubles match against the Japanese duo of Mizuki Fujii and Reika Kakiiwa. They then went on to beat the much higher ranked Cheng Wen-hsing and Chien Yu-chin of Chinese Taipei 25–23, 16–21, 21–18 to register their first win in the group stages. Gutta and Ashwini missed out on a quarterfinal berth by a difference of just one point, even though they beat Shinta Mulia Sari and Lei Yao of Singapore 21–16 21–15 in their last group B match, after tying with Japan and Taipei on the number of wins. Prior to India's final group game on Tuesday night, the World number five Japanese pair of Mizuki Fujii and Reika Kakiiwa had shockingly lost to Chinese Taipei's Cheng Wen Hsing and Chien Yu Chin, ranked 10th, 19–21 11–21. India lodged a formal protest with the Games organisers to probe if the women's doubles badminton match involving Japan and Chinese Taipei was played in the right spirit, following the elimination of medal hopes Gutta and Ashwini Ponnappa but no action was taken. Following the Olympic Games, Gutta went to a temporary sabbatical from the game.

=== 2013: Comeback and IBL ===
In January 2013, Gutta announced her comeback to the game and partnered Prajakta Sawant since Ponnappa was partnering with Pradnya Gadre and had committed to continue her partnership with Gadre so went on play with Sawant, who at that time was going through a battle against national coach Pullela Gopichand. Indian Badminton League (IBL) was announced the same year.

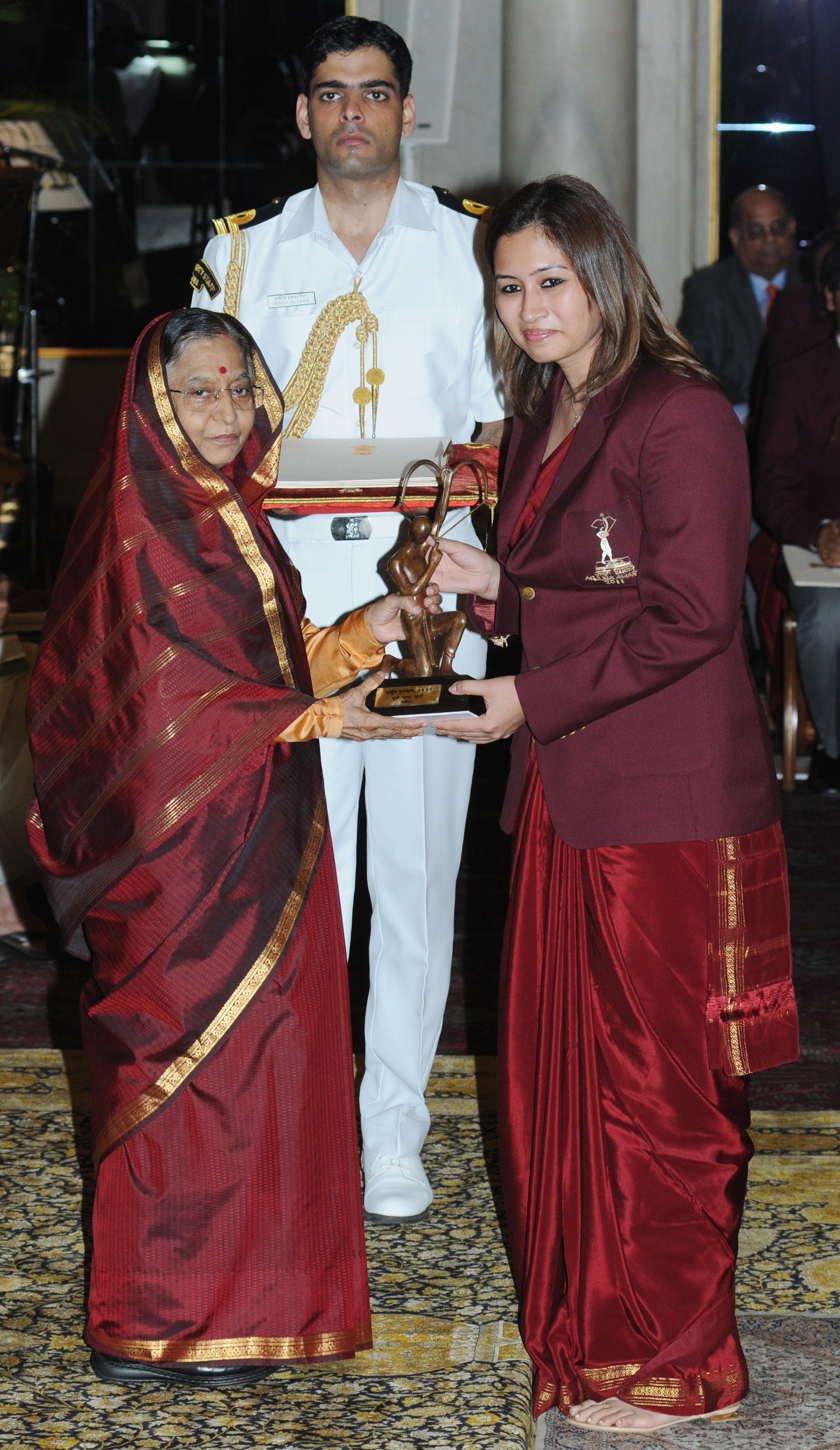
President Pratibha Patil presenting the Arjuna Award for the year 2011 to Gutta

IBL was a franchise league commercially managed by an Indian sports rights management company, Sporty Solutionz as commercial partners. With the brand value of US$1 million, Indian Badminton League was the richest badminton league in the world. Gutta was one of the six marquee players and team captains to be auctioned. The auction itself was not short of controversy. The base price of Gutta and Ashwini Ponnappa was halved from US$50,000 to US$25,000, without the players' notice and Women's Doubles event was replaced by a second Men's Singles. This left both Gutta and Ashwini hurt and angry. Gutta was bought for US$31,000 and captained the Delhi franchise, but the team did not reach the semis and finished fifth. Gutta and Ponnappa after IBL confirmed on that they were set to reunite. Gutta went on to add that the two decided to come together because of a couple of reasons. The first was the Indian Badminton League's organisers knocking out the women's doubles category from the tournament, which in turn resulted in the base prices of Gutta and Ashwini.

=== 2014: Asian and Uber Cup bronze, CWG silver ===
In 2014 Gutta and Ashwini won the bronze medal at Asian Championships in April defeating 3rd seeded Thai pair of Kunchala Voravichitchaikul and Duanganong Aroonkesorn 21–11, 21–18 en route losing out to Chinese twins Luo Ying and Luo Yu at the semi-final stage. The pair played a key role in India's historic Bronze at the Uber Cup in New Delhi. The duo unleashed a giant-killing spree as they had to face much higher ranked opponents in most of their matches and they won each, their biggest win came when outplayed the World No. 9 team of Greysia Polii and Nitya Krishinda Maheswari 21–18, 21–18 from Indonesia in the first doubles match of the tie. The win took India to the semis for the first time in Uber Cup history and assured them of the bronze medal. They later participated at the 2014 Commonwealth Games and narrowly missed the podium finish in the team event came up with the silver medal at the games losing put to Malaysian pair of Vivian Hoo and Woon Khe Wei in a closely contested final. The Indian pair lost the first game 17–21, before going down in a well-fought second game. Gutta and Ponnappa had taken the lead and looked good to take the match into the deciding third game. It was their second medal at the games after the 2010 Gold.

=== 2015: Canada GP title and top-10 ranking ===
Gutta and Ashwini kick-started 2015 with a semi-final appearance at 2015 India Open Grand Prix Gold held at Lucknow. They next appeared in the prestigious All England Open reached the 2nd round losing out to the top seeds Tian Qing and Zhao Yunlei in straight games. The pair of Gutta and Ponnappa also re-entered the Top-20 rankings after All England.

In May, Gutta played for India at the 2015 Sudirman Cup as they were placed in group 1D, clubbed together with three-time winner Korea and Malaysia. The Malaysian team was buoyed by the return of former world no. 1 Lee Chong Wei from a dope-related suspension and that made things difficult for India. India started with a narrow 2–3 loss to Malaysia Saina Nehwal and the duo of Gutta and Ponnappa delivered the wins. Gutta and Ashwini stole the show with their determined efforts that saw them upsetting the world no. 11 pair of Vivian Hoo and Woon Khe Wei 21–18, 19–21, 21–15.

After the narrow defeat against Malaysia, India needed to win the tie v Korea to progress into the quarter-finals. Parupalli Kashyap and the men's doubles pair of Pranav Chopra and Akshay Dewalkar lost both their matches the onus was once again on Gutta and Ponnappa. They fought hard but it was not enough to topple the Koreans. Chang Ye Na and Jung Kyung-eun won the contest 18–21, 21–12, 21–12 to seal a 3–1 victory for Korea. With defeats in both the rubbers India failed to make the quarter-finals.

Gutta and Ashwini then participated in the 2015 U.S. Open Grand Prix Gold and the pair seeded 4th reached the semi-finals losing out to Japanese pair of Ayane Kurihara and Naru Shinoya 17–21, 11–21. En route to semis they did not lose a single game and defeated Turkish pair of Neslihan Yiğit and Özge Bayrak 21–10, 21–18 and in the quarter-finals defeated German seventh seeds Johanna Goliszewski and Carla Nelte 21–17, 21–14.

The pair next participated in the 2015 Canada Open Grand Prix and seeded third went on to win the title defeating top seeded Dutch pair of Eefje Muskens and Selena Piek 21–19, 21–16. It was the pairs first title since coming back together after the 2012 Olympics. The win was commended by the Indian media as the duo were the only women's doubles pair from the country to win a Grand Prix title. Gutta expressed her concerns for lack of support for doubles in the country and prompted the association and the government to promote doubles. Gutta told NDTV in an interview, "We though big wins would wake up concerned people but it hasn't happened yet. We are still confident of representing India at an international level but here, extra support is needed as we can't afford it on our own.

Continuing their good form Gutta and Ponnappa reached the quarter-final stage of the 2015 BWF World Championships. The pair received a bye in the first round and defeated Hsieh Pei-chen and Wu Ti-jung of Chinese Taipei in straight sets. In the last 16 clash the pair stunned world no. 6 pair of Reika Kakiiwa and Miyuki Maeda from Japan 21–15, 18–21, 21–19. The pair missed out on the bronze medal after losing out to another Japanese pair of Naoko Fukuman and Kurumi Yonao.

The quarter-final finish at the World Championships helped Gutta and Ponnappa jump 2 places in the BWF World Ranking, and they entered the top 10 for the first time in their career. With this Gutta thus became the first player to be ranked in the Top-10 of the world rankings in both the doubles category.

=== 2016: PBL & Second Uber Cup Bronze ===
Gutta began her 2016 with the Premier Badminton League, where she represented Hyderabad Hunters alongside Lee Chong Wei and Parupalli Kashyap. She played in the mixed doubles alongside Indonesian Markis Kido and Danish Carsten Mogensen. The team couldn't qualify for the knock-out stage, finishing fifth in the standings.

In May, Gutta was part of the Indian team for the 2016 Thomas & Uber Cup held at Kunshan, China. The Indian women's team was put into Group- D alongside Japan, Germany and Australia. The India team beat Germany and Australia 5–0 before losing out to Japan to finish second in the group. In the quarter-finals they came back from a 0–1 deficit after Saina Nehwal lost the first singles to beat Thailand 3–1. Gutta and Ponnappa won their match in straight sets to secure a semifinal berth and the team's second consecutive bronze medal. The Indian team was however beaten by eventual champions China in the semifinal stage.

== Performance in mixed doubles ==
=== Early years ===
Gutta has won titles in the Jakarta Satellite tournament and Welsh International tournament in the year 2005, Sri Lanka International Satellite tournament, Cyprus Badminton International tournament and Indian International Challenge tournament in the year 2007, and Nepal International Series tournament, Bitburger Open Grand Prix tournament and KLRC Bulgaria Open Grand Prix tournament in the year 2008.

=== Success and top-10 breakthrough ===
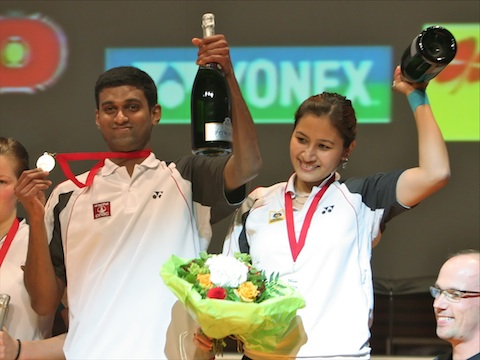
Gutta and Diju won the Chinese Taipei Open in 2009 becoming the first Indian pair to win Grand Prix Gold Event.

Their breakthrough came when Gutta and her partner Valiyaveetil Diju became the first Indian badminton mixed doubles pair to win a Grand Prix Gold title. They defeated Indonesia's Hendra Aprida Gunawan and Vita Marissa 24–22, 21–18 in the Chinese Taipei Open final. In the quarterfinal, the world No. 7 pair and third seed in the tournament, defeated Korean pair Shin Baek-cheol and Yoo Hyun-Young and in the semi-final Diju and Gutta prevailed over Malaysians Goh Liu Ying and Chan Peng Soon 21–11, 17–21, 24–22.

But the biggest achievement came in the same year where she and Diju again reached the quarters of the 2009 BWF World Championships and became the first Indians to do so repeating the feat at The Championships the following year. The Championships were held at Hyderabad, India. The duo, seeded 8th, got a bye in the first round followed by a walkover in the second. In the third round they defeated 12th seed Polish pair of Robert Mateusiak and Nadieżda Kostiuczyk 21–11 22–20 in a 31-minute clash. In the quarterfinal they went down to defending champions and second seeds Nova Widianto and Liliyana Natsir of Indonesia. The Indian pair was beaten 16–21, 14–21 in 27 minutes.

The same year they went on to reach the finals of the BWF Super Series Masters Finals, an annual tournament held at the end of every year where only the top players with the most points from that calendar year's twelve events of the BWF Super Series compete. They beat Robert Mateusiak and Nadieżda Kostiuczyk again in straight-games 21–19 21–11. In the final the Indian pair went down to World Championship bronze medallists Christinna Pedersen and Joachim Fischer Nielsen from Denmark 21–14, 21–18. By reaching the tournament finals they became the first Indians to reach the feat in any of the 5 disciplines.

In 2010 the pair reached the quarter-finals of the World Championships for the second consecutive year beaten by Koreans Ha Jung-eun and Ko Sung-hyun 21–16, 21–19 having beaten the English pair of Gabrielle White and Chris Adcock and Malaysians Liu Ying and Peng Soon in straight games and overcoming Yao Lei and Chayut Triyachart from Indonesia in the pre-quarters in three games. The pair also won the 2010 India Open Grand Prix Gold for their second Grand Prix Gold title beating Lei and Triyachart in three games. In 2011 Gutta and Diju reached the quarter-finals or better at three tournaments including two Super Series Premieres events at Denmark Open and China Masters where they reached the semi-finals, their first since 2009. They beat second seeded Chinese pair of Tao Jiaming and Tian Qing in the first round 5–21, 21–14, 21–18.

=== 2012 Olympics and sabbatical ===
Gutta and Diju reached two quarter-finals in 2012 at the Victor Korea Superseries Premier Singapore Open Superseries before competing at 2012 Summer Olympics. Pairing with Diju, Gutta lost her opening match 16–21, 12–21 in just 25 minutes at the Wembley Arena in London Olympics. The pair also lost their next two matches and thus could not qualify for the knockout stage. Despite having enjoyed great success in the Mixed Doubles category, she has shifted her focus on to Women's Doubles event since her sabbatical. In March 2016, Gutta announced a comeback to the mixed category. She stated in her interview that she missed the titles she "used to win with V Diju". She confirmed that she would not play alongside Diju but was a looking for a suitable partner and would start playing in April.

=== 2016: Comeback to mixed doubles ===
In an interview in August 2016, Gutta shared her plans of returning to the mixed doubles competition, without disclosing a probable partner.

== Personal life and other works ==
During her badminton career, Gutta began dating fellow badminton player Chetan Anand. The couple married on 17 July 2005 and got divorced on 29 June 2011. Her divorce gained unwanted media attention and speculation arose about an affair with ex-cricketer Mohammad Azharuddin which was never confirmed amid constant denials from Gutta herself. Azharuddin confirmed filing his divorce but denied that it had anything to do with Gutta.

Azhar had also hinted that these stories had been planted by people in the Badminton Association of India, who wanted to tarnish his image since he tried to contest for the presidents' elections. He said, "These are planted stories and motivated by people, who are against me in the Badminton Association of India. They are so upsetting." In 2013, Gutta said in an interview, "I learnt a lot from the marriage but we weren't growing as a couple. A part of me forgot that I too was a part of the sport. I was satisfied thinking that his victories were our victories."

Gutta has supported some social causes, including women empowerment issues, anti-tobacco and anti-zoo campaigns. She has also been involved in many other campaigns including the Ice Bucket Challenge and Swachh Bharat Abhiyan. Gutta also launched the Indian Badminton League's (IBL) school programme 'Shuttle Express' in Pune for school children. Speaking during the briefing, Gutta said: "I am really happy to be here with the kids who are playing not only to win the Shuttle Express but to be the next badminton champion for India. Wishing everyone all the best and I know the Pune participants will make everyone proud."

In 2013, she made her film debut with a cameo appearance in a song from the Telugu-language film Gunde Jaari Gallanthayyinde. Jwala describes herself as atheist.

Gutta was reportedly dating Tamil film actor Vishnu Vishal. Both of them posted pictures on their social media, confirming the same, for the New Year 2020. On her birthday in 2020, the couple got engaged. They were married on 22 April 2021, in Hyderabad. Their daughter was born on their fourth wedding anniversary. Aamir Khan named their child Mira.

== In the media ==
"Life is all about love. It's a score in badminton, but in both, one begins from scratch, is what I believe in." – Jwala in an interview with the Hindustan Times.

Gutta has been listed among the most inspirational sportswomen from India on numerous occasions. Her outspoken nature has often attracted controversies from various groups. According to Gutta, such controversies do not bother her as she had been taught to speak up for whats right and take a stand for herself and others too. "My father (Kranti) told me at a young age to fight for what I believed in. I've never learnt to butter up people," stated Gutta in an interview with Hindustan Times. "Controversies don't bother me. I'm not the one who instigates them. But when your name gets dragged into it, you can't keep quiet," she said. She said she is targeted because she speaks her mind. S. M. Arif, Gutta's coach, said, "This girl, she is there with me since she was 4 years old, from that age she is there with me and one thing about her is that she is the laziest person as far as the training is concerned and as far as the court is concerned you keep her for the whole long day and she will be happy, otherwise her genes might be helping her out."

Gutta has spoken against body shaming in sports. In an interview she said, "I don't understand this image thing. What's wrong in liking clothes or dressing up? In India, there is this image that if you dress shabbily, you are a serious sportsperson. If you care about dressing up, you aren't one. People are under the impression I lead an exciting life but honestly, all I do is sleep, eat and practice". Gutta is also a celebrity endorser and has been associated with several brands and services, also appearing on the covers of numerous magazines.

In January 2020, Gutta taunted Saina Nehwal for joining the current ruling party BJP.

== IBL row ==
A controversy erupted during the 25 August tie of the Indian Badminton League when the Delhi Smashers had threatened to pull out from the lot match against Banga Beats over the last-minute replacement of injured Hu Yun of Hong Kong, with Denmark's Jan Ø. Jørgensen. As the team captain for Smashers, Gutta was involved in a lengthy discussion, which was resolved after Beats agreed to drop Jorgensen. Gutta was then served a 14-day showcause notice by BAI for her conduct during the tie, which was delayed by half an hour. In what was dubbed a surprise decision, BAI's disciplinary committee recommended a life ban on Gutta for the same.

BAI president Akhilesh Das Gupta had said that if Gutta tenders an unconditional apology, her case may be reconsidered. However, she said that she would not apologise as asked by the BAI. Her camp made note of two potential reasons for the harsh stand taken by BAI; first, Gutta had been vocal against the women's doubles event being taken off the competition in IBL, a decision that had created quite a stir before the tournament, and second, the coming together of Gutta and Ponnappa for the women's doubles (who did not train at Pullela Gopichand's academy). On the advice of her coach, S. M. Arif, Gutta filed a defamation suit against BAI for going to the press without issuing her a ban notice. "This is cruellest joke on badminton and on a player of Gutta's calibre," Arif said adding that she committed no mistake and hence there is no question of an apology. He said that the BAI had repeatedly insulted the player who has brought laurels to the country.

Blaming Gopichand, the chief national coach, for "not supporting her" in the fiasco, Gutta said she tried to resolve the issue by talking to everyone in the administration even before the show cause notice was issued. She spoke with the press saying, "I love to play [...] No one on this earth can stop me from playing. In fact, no one should stop anyone from playing. I never thought that they [BAI] would stoop down to this level."

Eventually, the Delhi High Court put a stay on BAI's decision to not allow Gutta to play at international tournaments. Justice V.K. Jain told the BAI, "You must allow her to play.". During the controversy, Gutta received overwhelming support from fans and fellow sports-persons. Several former players described the BAI disciplinary committee's recommendation of a life ban on the player as "ridiculous" and "harsh". Former national coach U. Vimal Kumar said the HC order has shown Indian badminton in bad light. S.M. Arif, was even harsher saying, "The emphasis on her apology rather than the misconduct attributed to her shows clearly that the BAI has gone off the rails." Gutta also received support from Petroleum Minister Veerappa Moily, who wrote a letter to Sports Minister Jitendra Singh, saying that Gutta was being treated unfairly and if it continued then the Petroleum sector may be forced to reconsider its association with BAI at various levels. He warned the Sports Ministry be fair to Gutta or lose funding. The Sports Minister responded to Moily's letter saying that he would examine her case and extend all the support to her.

The long-standing deadlock between Gutta and the Association ended with the national federation dropping all the charges against her. The impasse was reported to have ended in New Delhi when Gutta met BAI president Akhilesh Das after the 78th Senior National Championships where she had emerged as the doubles champion alongside Ponnappa. "I am very happy with the decision BAI has taken. I will be playing as a part of the Indian team in future tournaments too. It will be an honour to represent the country as always," Gutta was quoted as saying to the Times of India.

== Awards ==
In 2011, Gutta was awarded the Arjuna award by the Indian Government, India's second highest sporting honour for her achievements as a badminton player.

== Career highlights ==
=== BWF World Championships ===
Women's doubles
Year	Venue	Partner	Opponent	Score	Result
2011	Wembley Arena, London, England	(India) Ashwini Ponnappa	(China) Tian Qing (China) Zhao Yunlei	14–21, 16–21	Bronze

=== Commonwealth Games ===
Women's doubles
Year	Venue	Partner	Opponent	Score	Result
2014	Emirates Arena, Glasgow, Scotland	(India) Ashwini Ponnappa	(Malaysia) Vivian Kah Mun Hoo (Malaysia) Woon Khe Wei	17–21, 21–23	Silver
2010	Siri Fort Sports Complex, New Delhi, India	(India) Ashwini Ponnappa	(Singapore) Shinta Mulia Sari (Singapore) Yao Lei	21–16, 21–19	Gold

=== Asian Championships ===
Women's doubles
Year	Venue	Partner	Opponent	Score	Result
2014	Gimcheon Indoor Stadium; Gimcheon, South Korea	(India) Ashwini Ponnappa	(China) Luo Ying (China) Luo Yu	12–21, 7–21	Bronze

=== South Asian Games ===
Women's doubles
Year	Venue	Partner	Opponent	Score	Result
2016	Multipurpose Hall SAI-SAG Centre; Shillong, India	(India) Ashwini Ponnappa	(India) N. Sikki Reddy (India) K. Maneesha	21–9, 21–17	Gold
2006	Sugathadasa Indoor Stadium; Colombo, Sri Lanka	(India) Shruti Kurien	(India) B. R. Meenakshi (India) Aparna Balan	18–21, 23–21, 21–12	Gold
2004	Rodham Hall, Islamabad, Pakistan	(India) Shruti Kurien	(India) Fathima Nazneen (India) Manjusha Kanwar	15–6, 15–3	Gold

Mixed doubles
Year	Venue	Partner	Opponent	Score	Result
2006	Sugathadasa Indoor Stadium; Colombo, Sri Lanka	(India) V. Diju	(India) Thomas Kurien (India) Aparna Balan	21–11, 21–13	Gold
2004	Rodham Hall, Islamabad, Pakistan	(India) Jaseel P. Ismail	(India) Marcos Bristow (India) Manjusha Kanwar	15–6, 15–3	Gold

=== BWF Superseries ===
Mixed doubles
Year	Tournament	Partner	Opponent	Score	Result
2009	Superseries Finals	(India) V. Diju	(Denmark) Joachim Fischer Nielsen (Denmark) Christinna Pedersen	14–21, 18–21	(silver) Runner-up

BWF Super Series Finals tournament
BWF Super Series Premier tournament
BWF Super Series tournament

=== BWF Grand Prix ===
Women's doubles
Year	Tournament	Partner	Opponent	Score	Result
2015	Canada Open	(India) Ashwini Ponnappa	(Netherlands) Eefje Muskens (Netherlands) Selena Piek	21–19, 21–16	(gold) Winner
2010	India Open	(India) Ashwini Ponnappa	(Singapore) Shinta Mulia Sari (Singapore) Yao Lei	11–21, 21–9, 15–21	(silver) Runner-up
2008	Bulgarian Open	(India) Shruti Kurien	(Indonesia) Shendy Puspa Irawati (Indonesia) Meiliana Jauhari	21–11, 21–19	(gold) Winner

Mixed doubles
Year	Tournament	Partner	Opponent	Score	Result
2010	India Open	(India) V. Diju	(Singapore) Chayut Triyachart (Singapore) Yao Lei	23–21, 20–22, 21–7	(gold) Winner
2009	Chinese Taipei Open	(India) V. Diju	(Indonesia) Hendra Aprida Gunawan (Indonesia) Vita Marissa	23–21, 21–18	(gold) Winner
2009	India Open	(India) V. Diju	(Indonesia) Flandy Limpele (Indonesia) Vita Marissa	14–21, 17–21	(silver) Runner-up
2008	Bulgarian Open	(India) V. Diju	(Indonesia) Fran Kurniawan (Indonesia) Shendy Puspa Irawati	15–21, 21–18, 21–19	(gold) Winner
2008	Bitburger Open	(India) V. Diju	(Denmark) Joachim Fischer Nielsen (Denmark) Christinna Pedersen	8–21, 21–17, 22–20	(gold) Winner

=== BWF International Challenge/Series/Satellite ===
Women's doubles
Year	Tournament	Partner	Opponent	Score	Result
2008	Nepal International	(India) Shruti Kurien	(India) Anjali Kalita (India) Jyotshna Polavarapu	21–6, 21–8	(gold) Winner
2007	Tata Open India International	(India) Shruti Kurien	(India) Jyotshna Polavarapu (India) Aparna Balan	21–11, 21–8	(gold) Winner
2007	Pakistan International	(India) Shruti Kurien	(Sri Lanka) Renu Chandrika Hettiarachchige (Sri Lanka) Thilini Jayasinghe	21–13, 21–14	(gold) Winner
2007	Cyprus International	(India) Shruti Kurien	(Estonia) Kati Tolmoff (Iceland) Ragna Ingolfsdottir	21–12, 21–13	(gold) Winner
2006	India Satellite	(India) Shruti Kurien	(South Korea) Jung Youn-kyung (South Korea) Kim Min-jung	18–21, 19–21	(silver) Runner-up
2006	Sri Lanka Satellite	(India) Shruti Kurien	(Malaysia) Haw Chiou Hwee (Malaysia) Lim Yin Loo	21–15, 14–21, 22–20	(gold) Winner
2004	Syed Modi International	(India) Shruti Kurien	(Malaysia) Wong Mew Choo (Malaysia) Anita Raj Kaur	15–5, 17–15	(gold) Winner
2004	Le Volant d'Or de Toulouse	(India) Shruti Kurien	(Russia) Anastasia Russkikh (Bulgaria) Petya Nedelcheva	11–15, 6–15	(silver) Runner-up

Mixed doubles
Year	Tournament	Partner	Opponent	Score	Result
2008	Nepal International	(India) V. Diju	(India) J. B. S. Vidyadhar (India) Shruti Kurien	21–12, 21–15	(gold) Winner
2007	Tata Open India International	(India) V. Diju	(India) Rupesh Kumar (India) Aparna Balan	21–14, 21–16	(gold) Winner
2007	Cyprus International	(India) Chetan Anand	(Denmark) Christian John Skovgaard (Denmark) Maria Kaaberbol Thorberg	21–14, 22–20	(gold) Winner
2006	Sri Lanka Satellite	(India) Chetan Anand	(Malaysia) Chan Peng Soon (Malaysia) Haw Chiou Hwee	21–10, 15–21, 21–18	(gold) Winner
2005	Welsh International	(India) V. Diju	(Scotland) Watson Briggs (Scotland) Imogen Bankier	12–15, 15–2, 15–9	(gold) Winner
2005	Jakarta Satellite	(India) V. Diju	(Vietnam) Trần Thanh Hải (Vietnam) Ngô Hải Vân	15–1, 15–3	(gold) Winner
2001	India Satellite	(India) J. B. S. Vidyadhar	(India) Sandesh Chouta (India) B. R. Meenakshi	15–10, 11–15, 15–9	(gold) Winner

BWF International Challenge tournament
BWF International Series tournament

=== BWF events ===
Result	Year	Tournament	Partner
Quarter-Finals	2009	BWF World Championships	V. Diju
Quarter-Finals	2010	BWF World Championships	V. Diju
Bronze Medal	2011	BWF World Championships	Ashwini Ponnappa
Bronze Medal	2014	Uber Cup	Women's Team
Quarter-Finals	2015	BWF World Championships	Ashwini Ponnappa
Bronze Medal	2016	Uber Cup	Women's Team

=== Others ===
Result	Year	Tournament	Partner
Bronze Medal	2006	Commonwealth Games	Mixed Team
Gold Medal	2010	Commonwealth Games	Ashwini Ponnappa
Silver Medal	2010	Commonwealth Games	Mixed Team
Bronze Medal	2014	Badminton Asia Championships	Ashwini Ponnappa
Silver Medal	2014	Commonwealth Games	Ashwini Ponnappa
