= 2009 BWF season =

2009 BWF Season
Details
- Duration: January 6, 2009 – December 20, 2009

Achievements (singles)

Awards
- Player of the year: (Malaysia) Lee Chong Wei (Male) (China) Wang Yihan (Female)

The 2009 BWF Season was the overall badminton circuit organized by the Badminton World Federation (BWF) for the 2009 badminton season to publish and promote the sport. Besides the BWF World Championships, BWF promotes the sport of Badminton through an extensive worldwide program of events. These events have various purposes according to their level and territory in which they are held but those events owned by BWF seek to showcase the Sport via the widest possible quality television broadcast and build the fanbase of the Sport throughout the World.

The world badminton tournament structure has four levels: Level 1 (BWF Major Events: Thomas Cup, Uber Cup, Sudirman Cup, Suhadinata Cup, World Championships, Bimantara Cup, and World Senior Championships), Level 2 (BWF Superseries: Superseries and Superseries Masters Finals), Level 3 (BWF Grand Prix: Grand Prix and Grand Prix Gold), and Level 4 (BWF Continental Tournament: International Challenge, International Series, and Future Series). The Thomas Cup & Uber Cup, Sudirman Cup and Suhandinata Cup are Teams Events. The others – Superseries, Grand Prix Events, International Challenge, International Series, Future Series and Bimantara Cup are all individual tournaments. The higher the level of tournament, the larger the prize money and the more ranking points available.

The 2009 BWF Season calendar comprised the World Championships tournaments, the Sudirman Cup, the BWF Super Series (Super Series and Super Series Masters Finals), the Grand Prix (Grand Prix Gold and Grand Prix), the International Series (International Series and International Challenge), and Future Series.

== Schedule ==
This is the complete schedule of events on the 2009 calendar, with the Champions and Runners-up documented.

Key

World Championships
Super Series Finals
Super Series
Grand Prix Gold
Grand Prix
International Challenge
International Series
Future Series
Team events

=== January ===
Week of	Tournament	Champions	Runners-up
January 5	Malaysia Open (Draw): Host: Kuala Lumpur, Malaysia; Level: Superseries; Format: 32MS/32WS/32MD/32WD/32XD	(Malaysia) Lee Chong Wei	(South Korea) Park Sung-hwan
January 5	Malaysia Open (Draw): Host: Kuala Lumpur, Malaysia; Level: Superseries; Format: 32MS/32WS/32MD/32WD/32XD	Score: 21–13, 21–7	
January 5	Malaysia Open (Draw): Host: Kuala Lumpur, Malaysia; Level: Superseries; Format: 32MS/32WS/32MD/32WD/32XD	(Denmark) Tine Rasmussen	(Hong Kong) Zhou Mi
January 5	Malaysia Open (Draw): Host: Kuala Lumpur, Malaysia; Level: Superseries; Format: 32MS/32WS/32MD/32WD/32XD	Score: 21–17, 15–21, 21–16	
January 5	Malaysia Open (Draw): Host: Kuala Lumpur, Malaysia; Level: Superseries; Format: 32MS/32WS/32MD/32WD/32XD	(South Korea) Jung Jae-sung (South Korea) Lee Yong-dae	(Indonesia) Alvent Yulianto Chandra (Indonesia) Hendra Aprida Gunawan
January 5	Malaysia Open (Draw): Host: Kuala Lumpur, Malaysia; Level: Superseries; Format: 32MS/32WS/32MD/32WD/32XD	Score: 18–21, 21–14, 21–14	
January 5	Malaysia Open (Draw): Host: Kuala Lumpur, Malaysia; Level: Superseries; Format: 32MS/32WS/32MD/32WD/32XD	(South Korea) Lee Hyo-jung (South Korea) Lee Kyung-won	(China) Yang Wei (China) Zhang Jiewen
January 5	Malaysia Open (Draw): Host: Kuala Lumpur, Malaysia; Level: Superseries; Format: 32MS/32WS/32MD/32WD/32XD	Score: 21–15, 21–12	
January 5	Malaysia Open (Draw): Host: Kuala Lumpur, Malaysia; Level: Superseries; Format: 32MS/32WS/32MD/32WD/32XD	(Indonesia) Nova Widianto (Indonesia) Lilyana Natsir	(South Korea) Lee Yong-dae (South Korea) Lee Hyo-jung
January 5	Malaysia Open (Draw): Host: Kuala Lumpur, Malaysia; Level: Superseries; Format: 32MS/32WS/32MD/32WD/32XD	Score: 21–14, 21–19	
January 12	Korea Open (Draw): Host: Seoul, South Korea; Level: Superseries; Format: 32MS/32WS/32MD/32WD/32XD	(Denmark) Peter Hoeg Gade	(Malaysia) Lee Chong Wei
January 12	Korea Open (Draw): Host: Seoul, South Korea; Level: Superseries; Format: 32MS/32WS/32MD/32WD/32XD	Score: 21–18, 10–21, 21–17	
January 12	Korea Open (Draw): Host: Seoul, South Korea; Level: Superseries; Format: 32MS/32WS/32MD/32WD/32XD	(Denmark) Tine Rasmussen	(France) Pi Hongyan
January 12	Korea Open (Draw): Host: Seoul, South Korea; Level: Superseries; Format: 32MS/32WS/32MD/32WD/32XD	Score: 21–19, 21–19	
January 12	Korea Open (Draw): Host: Seoul, South Korea; Level: Superseries; Format: 32MS/32WS/32MD/32WD/32XD	(Denmark) Mathias Boe (Denmark) Carsten Mogensen	(South Korea) Jung Jae-sung (South Korea) Lee Yong-dae
January 12	Korea Open (Draw): Host: Seoul, South Korea; Level: Superseries; Format: 32MS/32WS/32MD/32WD/32XD	Score: 21–12, 24–22	
January 12	Korea Open (Draw): Host: Seoul, South Korea; Level: Superseries; Format: 32MS/32WS/32MD/32WD/32XD	(Chinese Taipei) Cheng Wen-hsing (Chinese Taipei) Chien Yu-chin	(South Korea) Lee Hyo-jung (South Korea) Lee Kyung-won
January 12	Korea Open (Draw): Host: Seoul, South Korea; Level: Superseries; Format: 32MS/32WS/32MD/32WD/32XD	Score: 21–19, 21–8	
January 12	Korea Open (Draw): Host: Seoul, South Korea; Level: Superseries; Format: 32MS/32WS/32MD/32WD/32XD	(South Korea) Lee Yong-dae (South Korea) Lee Hyo-jung	(Thailand) Songphon Anugritayawon (Thailand) Kunchala Voravichitchaikul
January 12	Korea Open (Draw): Host: Seoul, South Korea; Level: Superseries; Format: 32MS/32WS/32MD/32WD/32XD	Score: 21–8, 21–7	
January 12	Estonian International: Host: Tallinn, Estonia; Level: International Series; Format: 32MS/32WS/32MD/32WD/32XD	(Finland) Ville Lang	(Denmark) Kasper Ipsen
January 12	Estonian International: Host: Tallinn, Estonia; Level: International Series; Format: 32MS/32WS/32MD/32WD/32XD	Score: 21–14, 21–19	
January 12	Estonian International: Host: Tallinn, Estonia; Level: International Series; Format: 32MS/32WS/32MD/32WD/32XD	(Russia) Tatjana Bibik	(Denmark) Anne Hald Jensen
January 12	Estonian International: Host: Tallinn, Estonia; Level: International Series; Format: 32MS/32WS/32MD/32WD/32XD	Score: 21–11, 21–10	
January 12	Estonian International: Host: Tallinn, Estonia; Level: International Series; Format: 32MS/32WS/32MD/32WD/32XD	(Japan) Naoki Kawamae (Japan) Shoji Sato	(Russia) Andrey Ashmarin (Russia) Anton Ivanov
January 12	Estonian International: Host: Tallinn, Estonia; Level: International Series; Format: 32MS/32WS/32MD/32WD/32XD	Score: 21–13, 21–9	
January 12	Estonian International: Host: Tallinn, Estonia; Level: International Series; Format: 32MS/32WS/32MD/32WD/32XD	(China) Cai Jiani (China) Rong Bo	(Russia) Irina Khlebko (Russia) Ksenia Polikarpova
January 12	Estonian International: Host: Tallinn, Estonia; Level: International Series; Format: 32MS/32WS/32MD/32WD/32XD	Score: 21–13, 21–15	
January 12	Estonian International: Host: Tallinn, Estonia; Level: International Series; Format: 32MS/32WS/32MD/32WD/32XD	(China) Zhang Yi (China) Cai Jiani	(Russia) Andrey Ashmarin (Russia) Ksenia Polikarpova
January 12	Estonian International: Host: Tallinn, Estonia; Level: International Series; Format: 32MS/32WS/32MD/32WD/32XD	Score: 21–9, 21–14	
January 19	Swedish International: Host: Stockholm, Sweden; Level: International Challenge; Format: 32MS/32WS/32MD/32WD/32XD	(Denmark) Jan Ø. Jørgensen	(Netherlands) Dicky Palyama
January 19	Swedish International: Host: Stockholm, Sweden; Level: International Challenge; Format: 32MS/32WS/32MD/32WD/32XD	Score: 16–21, 22–20, 21–17	
January 19	Swedish International: Host: Stockholm, Sweden; Level: International Challenge; Format: 32MS/32WS/32MD/32WD/32XD	(Japan) Yu Hirayama	(Malaysia) Anita Raj Kaur
January 19	Swedish International: Host: Stockholm, Sweden; Level: International Challenge; Format: 32MS/32WS/32MD/32WD/32XD	Score: 21–15, 21–14	
January 19	Swedish International: Host: Stockholm, Sweden; Level: International Challenge; Format: 32MS/32WS/32MD/32WD/32XD	(Japan) Naoki Kawamae (Japan) Shoji Sato	(England) Chris Langridge (England) David Lindley
January 19	Swedish International: Host: Stockholm, Sweden; Level: International Challenge; Format: 32MS/32WS/32MD/32WD/32XD	Score: 15–21, 21–14, 21–17	
January 19	Swedish International: Host: Stockholm, Sweden; Level: International Challenge; Format: 32MS/32WS/32MD/32WD/32XD	(Netherlands) Rachel Van Cutsen (Netherlands) Paulien Van Dooremalen	(Sweden) Emelie Lennartsson (Sweden) Emma Wengberg
January 19	Swedish International: Host: Stockholm, Sweden; Level: International Challenge; Format: 32MS/32WS/32MD/32WD/32XD	Score: 20–22, 21–19, 22–20	
January 19	Swedish International: Host: Stockholm, Sweden; Level: International Challenge; Format: 32MS/32WS/32MD/32WD/32XD	(Ukraine) Valeriy Atrashchenkov (Ukraine) Elena Prus	(England) Robert Adcock (England) Heather Olver
January 19	Swedish International: Host: Stockholm, Sweden; Level: International Challenge; Format: 32MS/32WS/32MD/32WD/32XD	Score: 21–16, 21–11	

=== February ===
Week of	Tournament	Champions	Runners-up
February 2	Iran Fajr International: Host: Tehran, Iran; Level: International Series; Format: 64MS/64WS/32MD/32WD	(Iran) Mohammad Reza Kheradmandi	(Iran) Ali Shahhosseini
February 2	Iran Fajr International: Host: Tehran, Iran; Level: International Series; Format: 64MS/64WS/32MD/32WD	Score: 18–21, 21–18, 21–16	
February 2	Iran Fajr International: Host: Tehran, Iran; Level: International Series; Format: 64MS/64WS/32MD/32WD	(Turkey) Aprilsasi Putri Lejarsar Variella	(Malaysia) Sannatasah Saniru
February 2	Iran Fajr International: Host: Tehran, Iran; Level: International Series; Format: 64MS/64WS/32MD/32WD	Score: 17–21, 21–18, 21–17	
February 2	Iran Fajr International: Host: Tehran, Iran; Level: International Series; Format: 64MS/64WS/32MD/32WD	(Iran) Mohammad Reza Kheradmandi (Iran) Ali Shahhosseini	(Turkey) Kaya Ali (Turkey) Yoga Ukikasah
February 2	Iran Fajr International: Host: Tehran, Iran; Level: International Series; Format: 64MS/64WS/32MD/32WD	Score: 23–25, 23–21, 21–16	
February 2	Iran Fajr International: Host: Tehran, Iran; Level: International Series; Format: 64MS/64WS/32MD/32WD	(Turkey) Aprilsasi Putri Lejarsar Variella (Turkey) Ezgi Epice	(Malaysia) Sannatasah Saniru (Malaysia) Vivian Hoo Kah Mun
February 2	Iran Fajr International: Host: Tehran, Iran; Level: International Series; Format: 64MS/64WS/32MD/32WD	Score: 9–21, 21–11, 21–9	
February 9	European Mixed Team Badminton Championships (Draw): Host: Liverpool, England; Level: CC Team Championships; Format: 32 Teams (Round robin)	Denmark; Players: Mathias Boe, Joachim Fischer Nielsen, Peter Gade, Jan O. Jorgensen, Thomas Laybourn, Carsten Mogensen, Lars Paaske, Joachim Persson, Jonas Rasmussen, Hans-Kristian Vittinghus, Nanna Brosolat Jensen, Helle Nielsen, Lena Frier Kristiansen, Christinna Pedersen, Tine Rasmussen, Marie Roepke, Kamilla Rytter Juhl, Mie Schjoett-Kristensen	England; Players: Christopher Adcock, Robert Adcock, Ben Beckman, Robert Blair, Anthony Clark, Andrew Ellis, Rajiv Ouseph, Nathan Robertson, Andrew Smith, Mariana Agathangelou, Elizabeth Cann, Hellen Davies, Donna Kellogg, Sarah Walker, Jennifer Wallwork, Gabrielle White
February 9	European Mixed Team Badminton Championships (Draw): Host: Liverpool, England; Level: CC Team Championships; Format: 32 Teams (Round robin)	Score: 3–2	
February 16	Austrian International: Host: Vienna, Austria; Level: International Challenge; Format: 32MS/32WS/32MD/32WD/32XD	(Japan) Kazuteru Kozai	(Malaysia) Yeoh Kay Bin
February 16	Austrian International: Host: Vienna, Austria; Level: International Challenge; Format: 32MS/32WS/32MD/32WD/32XD	Score: 21–12, 12–21, 21–15	
February 16	Austrian International: Host: Vienna, Austria; Level: International Challenge; Format: 32MS/32WS/32MD/32WD/32XD	(Germany) Juliane Schenk	(Bulgaria) Petya Nedelcheva
February 16	Austrian International: Host: Vienna, Austria; Level: International Challenge; Format: 32MS/32WS/32MD/32WD/32XD	Score: 20–22, 21–8, 22–20	
February 16	Austrian International: Host: Vienna, Austria; Level: International Challenge; Format: 32MS/32WS/32MD/32WD/32XD	(Japan) Naoki Kawamae (Japan) Shoji Sato	(Japan) Yoshiteru Hirobe (Japan) Hajime Komiyama
February 16	Austrian International: Host: Vienna, Austria; Level: International Challenge; Format: 32MS/32WS/32MD/32WD/32XD	Score: 21–19, 21–17	
February 16	Austrian International: Host: Vienna, Austria; Level: International Challenge; Format: 32MS/32WS/32MD/32WD/32XD	(Japan) Shizuka Matsuo (Japan) Mami Naito	(Japan) Mizuki Fujii (Japan) Reika Kakiiwa
February 16	Austrian International: Host: Vienna, Austria; Level: International Challenge; Format: 32MS/32WS/32MD/32WD/32XD	Score: 21–15, 21–18	
February 16	Austrian International: Host: Vienna, Austria; Level: International Challenge; Format: 32MS/32WS/32MD/32WD/32XD	(England) Robert Adcock (England) Heather Olver	(Ukraine) Valeriy Atrashchenkov (Ukraine) Elena Prus
February 16	Austrian International: Host: Vienna, Austria; Level: International Challenge; Format: 32MS/32WS/32MD/32WD/32XD	Score: 21–17, 21–18	
February 16	Uganda International: Host: Kampala, Uganda; Level: International Series; Format: 64MS/32WS/16MD/16WD/16XD	(Iran) Ali Shahosseini	(Uganda) Wilson Tukire
February 16	Uganda International: Host: Kampala, Uganda; Level: International Series; Format: 64MS/32WS/16MD/16WD/16XD	Score: 21–17, 21–17	
February 16	Uganda International: Host: Kampala, Uganda; Level: International Series; Format: 64MS/32WS/16MD/16WD/16XD	(Mauritius) Karen Foo Kune	(Uganda) Margaret Nankabirwa
February 16	Uganda International: Host: Kampala, Uganda; Level: International Series; Format: 64MS/32WS/16MD/16WD/16XD	Score: 21–16, 21–9	
February 16	Uganda International: Host: Kampala, Uganda; Level: International Series; Format: 64MS/32WS/16MD/16WD/16XD	(Uganda) Shaban Nkutu (Iran) Ali Shahosseini	(Uganda) Brian Suuna (Uganda) Wilson Tukire
February 16	Uganda International: Host: Kampala, Uganda; Level: International Series; Format: 64MS/32WS/16MD/16WD/16XD	Score: 21–19, 21–18	
February 16	Uganda International: Host: Kampala, Uganda; Level: International Series; Format: 64MS/32WS/16MD/16WD/16XD	(Uganda) Shamim Bangi (Uganda) Margaret Nankabirwa	(Uganda) Rose Nakalya (Uganda) Norah Nassimbwa
February 16	Uganda International: Host: Kampala, Uganda; Level: International Series; Format: 64MS/32WS/16MD/16WD/16XD	Score: 21–16, 21–10	
February 16	Uganda International: Host: Kampala, Uganda; Level: International Series; Format: 64MS/32WS/16MD/16WD/16XD	(Uganda) Abraham Wogute (Uganda) Rita Namusisi	(Uganda) Ivan Karimunda (Uganda) Rose Nakalya
February 16	Uganda International: Host: Kampala, Uganda; Level: International Series; Format: 64MS/32WS/16MD/16WD/16XD	Score: 21–14, 21–10	
February 23	German Open: Host: Mülheim, Germany; Level: Grand Prix; Format: 64MS/32WS/32MD/32WD/32XD	(China) Bao Chunlai	(China) Gong Weijie
February 23	German Open: Host: Mülheim, Germany; Level: Grand Prix; Format: 64MS/32WS/32MD/32WD/32XD	Score: 21–18, 21–14	
February 23	German Open: Host: Mülheim, Germany; Level: Grand Prix; Format: 64MS/32WS/32MD/32WD/32XD	(China) Wang Yihan	(China) Zhu Lin
February 23	German Open: Host: Mülheim, Germany; Level: Grand Prix; Format: 64MS/32WS/32MD/32WD/32XD	Score: 20–22, 21–13, 21–11	
February 23	German Open: Host: Mülheim, Germany; Level: Grand Prix; Format: 64MS/32WS/32MD/32WD/32XD	(South Korea) Lee Yong-dae (South Korea) Shin Baek-cheol	(Japan) Kenichi Hayakawa (Japan) Kenta Kazuno
February 23	German Open: Host: Mülheim, Germany; Level: Grand Prix; Format: 64MS/32WS/32MD/32WD/32XD	Score: 21–13, 21–16	
February 23	German Open: Host: Mülheim, Germany; Level: Grand Prix; Format: 64MS/32WS/32MD/32WD/32XD	(China) Cheng Shu (China) Zhao Yunlei	(China) Pan Pan (China) Tian Qing
February 23	German Open: Host: Mülheim, Germany; Level: Grand Prix; Format: 64MS/32WS/32MD/32WD/32XD	Score: 18–21, 21–13, 21–16	
February 23	German Open: Host: Mülheim, Germany; Level: Grand Prix; Format: 64MS/32WS/32MD/32WD/32XD	(China) Xu Chen (China) Zhao Yunlei	(China) Zheng Bo (China) Ma Jin
February 23	German Open: Host: Mülheim, Germany; Level: Grand Prix; Format: 64MS/32WS/32MD/32WD/32XD	Score: 21–18, 23–21	

=== March ===
Week of	Tournament	Champions	Runners-up
March 2	All England Open (Draw): Host: Birmingham, England; Level: Superseries; Format: 32MS/32WS/32MD/32WD/32XD	(China) Lin Dan	(Malaysia) Lee Chong Wei
March 2	All England Open (Draw): Host: Birmingham, England; Level: Superseries; Format: 32MS/32WS/32MD/32WD/32XD	Score: 21–19, 21–12	
March 2	All England Open (Draw): Host: Birmingham, England; Level: Superseries; Format: 32MS/32WS/32MD/32WD/32XD	(China) Wang Yihan	(Denmark) Tine Rasmussen
March 2	All England Open (Draw): Host: Birmingham, England; Level: Superseries; Format: 32MS/32WS/32MD/32WD/32XD	Score: 21–19, 21–23, 21–11	
March 2	All England Open (Draw): Host: Birmingham, England; Level: Superseries; Format: 32MS/32WS/32MD/32WD/32XD	(China) Cai Yun (China) Fu Haifeng	(South Korea) Han Sang-hoon (South Korea) Hwang Ji-man
March 2	All England Open (Draw): Host: Birmingham, England; Level: Superseries; Format: 32MS/32WS/32MD/32WD/32XD	Score: 21–17, 21–15	
March 2	All England Open (Draw): Host: Birmingham, England; Level: Superseries; Format: 32MS/32WS/32MD/32WD/32XD	(China) Zhang Yawen (China) Zhao Tingting	(China) Cheng Shu (China) Zhao Yunlei
March 2	All England Open (Draw): Host: Birmingham, England; Level: Superseries; Format: 32MS/32WS/32MD/32WD/32XD	Score: 21–13, 21–15	
March 2	All England Open (Draw): Host: Birmingham, England; Level: Superseries; Format: 32MS/32WS/32MD/32WD/32XD	(China) He Hanbin (China) Yu Yang	(South Korea) Ko Sung-hyun (South Korea) Ha Jung-eun
March 2	All England Open (Draw): Host: Birmingham, England; Level: Superseries; Format: 32MS/32WS/32MD/32WD/32XD	Score: 13–21, 21–15, 21–9	
March 2	Croatian International: Host: Zagreb, Croatia; Level: International Series; Format: 32MS/32WS/32MD/16WD/32XD	(Denmark) Peter Mikkelsen	(Czech Republic) Jan Vondra
March 2	Croatian International: Host: Zagreb, Croatia; Level: International Series; Format: 32MS/32WS/32MD/16WD/32XD	Score: 23–21, 21–6	
March 2	Croatian International: Host: Zagreb, Croatia; Level: International Series; Format: 32MS/32WS/32MD/16WD/32XD	(Malaysia) Anita Raj Kaur	(Russia) Tatiana Bibik
March 2	Croatian International: Host: Zagreb, Croatia; Level: International Series; Format: 32MS/32WS/32MD/16WD/32XD	Score: 19–21, 21–12, 21–12	
March 2	Croatian International: Host: Zagreb, Croatia; Level: International Series; Format: 32MS/32WS/32MD/16WD/32XD	(Denmark) Mads Conrad-Petersen (Denmark) Mads Pieler Kolding	(Japan) Naoki Kawamae (Japan) Shoji Sato
March 2	Croatian International: Host: Zagreb, Croatia; Level: International Series; Format: 32MS/32WS/32MD/16WD/32XD	Score: 21–15, 21–19	
March 2	Croatian International: Host: Zagreb, Croatia; Level: International Series; Format: 32MS/32WS/32MD/16WD/32XD	(Turkey) Ezgi Epice (Germany) Claudia Vogelgsang	(Croatia) Matea Cica (Croatia) Andrea Žvorc
March 2	Croatian International: Host: Zagreb, Croatia; Level: International Series; Format: 32MS/32WS/32MD/16WD/32XD	Score: 20–22, 21–14, 21–9	
March 2	Croatian International: Host: Zagreb, Croatia; Level: International Series; Format: 32MS/32WS/32MD/16WD/32XD	(Croatia) Zvonimir Durkinjak (Croatia) Staša Poznanović	(Bulgaria) Konstantin Dobrev (Bulgaria) Maya Dobreva
March 2	Croatian International: Host: Zagreb, Croatia; Level: International Series; Format: 32MS/32WS/32MD/16WD/32XD	Score: 21–13, 17–21, 21–9	
March 9	Swiss Open (Draw): Host: Basel, Switzerland; Level: Superseries; Format: 32MS/32WS/32MD/32WD/32XD	(Malaysia) Lee Chong Wei	(China) Lin Dan
March 9	Swiss Open (Draw): Host: Basel, Switzerland; Level: Superseries; Format: 32MS/32WS/32MD/32WD/32XD	Score: 21–16, 21–16	
March 9	Swiss Open (Draw): Host: Basel, Switzerland; Level: Superseries; Format: 32MS/32WS/32MD/32WD/32XD	(China) Wang Yihan	(China) Jiang Yanjiao
March 9	Swiss Open (Draw): Host: Basel, Switzerland; Level: Superseries; Format: 32MS/32WS/32MD/32WD/32XD	Score: 21–17, 17–21, 21–13	
March 9	Swiss Open (Draw): Host: Basel, Switzerland; Level: Superseries; Format: 32MS/32WS/32MD/32WD/32XD	(Malaysia) Koo Kien Keat (Malaysia) Tan Boon Heong	(Denmark) Mathias Boe (Denmark) Carsten Mogensen
March 9	Swiss Open (Draw): Host: Basel, Switzerland; Level: Superseries; Format: 32MS/32WS/32MD/32WD/32XD	Score: 21–14, 21–18	
March 9	Swiss Open (Draw): Host: Basel, Switzerland; Level: Superseries; Format: 32MS/32WS/32MD/32WD/32XD	(China) Du Jing (China) Yu Yang	(South Korea) Lee Hyo-jung (South Korea) Lee Kyung-won
March 9	Swiss Open (Draw): Host: Basel, Switzerland; Level: Superseries; Format: 32MS/32WS/32MD/32WD/32XD	Score: 21–11, 21–12	
March 9	Swiss Open (Draw): Host: Basel, Switzerland; Level: Superseries; Format: 32MS/32WS/32MD/32WD/32XD	(China) Zheng Bo (China) Ma Jin	(South Korea) Lee Yong-dae (South Korea) Lee Hyo-jung
March 9	Swiss Open (Draw): Host: Basel, Switzerland; Level: Superseries; Format: 32MS/32WS/32MD/32WD/32XD	Score: 21–16, 21–15	
March 16	Banuinvest International: Host: Timișoara, Romania; Level: International Series; Format: 32MS/32WS/32MD/16WD/32XD	(Indonesia) Dionysius Hayom Rumbaka	(Indonesia) Bandar Sigit Pamungkas
March 16	Banuinvest International: Host: Timișoara, Romania; Level: International Series; Format: 32MS/32WS/32MD/16WD/32XD	Score: 16–21, 21–14, 21–12	
March 16	Banuinvest International: Host: Timișoara, Romania; Level: International Series; Format: 32MS/32WS/32MD/16WD/32XD	(Bulgaria) Petya Nedelcheva	(Bulgaria) Linda Zechiri
March 16	Banuinvest International: Host: Timișoara, Romania; Level: International Series; Format: 32MS/32WS/32MD/16WD/32XD	Score: 21–9, 21–17	
March 16	Banuinvest International: Host: Timișoara, Romania; Level: International Series; Format: 32MS/32WS/32MD/16WD/32XD	(Bulgaria) Julian Hristov (Bulgaria) Vladimir Metodiev	(Czech Republic) Ondrej Kopriva (Czech Republic) Tomas Kopriva
March 16	Banuinvest International: Host: Timișoara, Romania; Level: International Series; Format: 32MS/32WS/32MD/16WD/32XD	Score: 18–21, 21–15, 22–20	
March 16	Banuinvest International: Host: Timișoara, Romania; Level: International Series; Format: 32MS/32WS/32MD/16WD/32XD	(Bulgaria) Petya Nedelcheva (Bulgaria) Dimitria Popstoikova	(Romania) Alexandra Milon (Romania) Florentina Petre
March 16	Banuinvest International: Host: Timișoara, Romania; Level: International Series; Format: 32MS/32WS/32MD/16WD/32XD	Score: 21–17, 21–14	
March 16	Banuinvest International: Host: Timișoara, Romania; Level: International Series; Format: 32MS/32WS/32MD/16WD/32XD	(Ukraine) Valeriy Atrashchenkov (Ukraine) Elena Prus	(Wales) Richard Vaughan (Wales) Sarah Thomas
March 16	Banuinvest International: Host: Timișoara, Romania; Level: International Series; Format: 32MS/32WS/32MD/16WD/32XD	Score: 21–19, 21–12	
March 23	India Open: Host: Hyderabad, India; Level: Grand Prix Gold; Format: 64MS/32WS/32MD/32WD/32XD	(Indonesia) Taufik Hidayat	(Malaysia) Muhammad Hafiz Hashim
March 23	India Open: Host: Hyderabad, India; Level: Grand Prix Gold; Format: 64MS/32WS/32MD/32WD/32XD	Score: 21–18, 21–19	
March 23	India Open: Host: Hyderabad, India; Level: Grand Prix Gold; Format: 64MS/32WS/32MD/32WD/32XD	(France) Pi Hongyan	(Malaysia) Julia Wong Pei Xian
March 23	India Open: Host: Hyderabad, India; Level: Grand Prix Gold; Format: 64MS/32WS/32MD/32WD/32XD	Score: 17–21, 21–15, 21–14	
March 23	India Open: Host: Hyderabad, India; Level: Grand Prix Gold; Format: 64MS/32WS/32MD/32WD/32XD	(Malaysia) Choong Tan Fook (Malaysia) Lee Wan Wah	(Singapore) Hendri Kurniawan Saputra (Singapore) Hendra Wijaya
March 23	India Open: Host: Hyderabad, India; Level: Grand Prix Gold; Format: 64MS/32WS/32MD/32WD/32XD	Score: 21–9, 21–11	
March 23	India Open: Host: Hyderabad, India; Level: Grand Prix Gold; Format: 64MS/32WS/32MD/32WD/32XD	(China) Ma Jin (China) Wang Xiaoli	(Indonesia) Vita Marissa (Indonesia) Nadya Melati
March 23	India Open: Host: Hyderabad, India; Level: Grand Prix Gold; Format: 64MS/32WS/32MD/32WD/32XD	Score: 21–14, 21–13	
March 23	India Open: Host: Hyderabad, India; Level: Grand Prix Gold; Format: 64MS/32WS/32MD/32WD/32XD	(Indonesia) Flandy Limpele (Indonesia) Vita Marissa	(India) Diju Valiyaveetil (India) Jwala Gutta
March 23	India Open: Host: Hyderabad, India; Level: Grand Prix Gold; Format: 64MS/32WS/32MD/32WD/32XD	Score: 21–14, 21–17	
March 23	Polish International: Host: Warsaw, Poland; Level: International Challenge; Format: 64MS/64WS/32MD/32WD/32XD	(Netherlands) Dicky Palyama	(Estonia) Raul Must
March 23	Polish International: Host: Warsaw, Poland; Level: International Challenge; Format: 64MS/64WS/32MD/32WD/32XD	Score: 21–12, 21–17	
March 23	Polish International: Host: Warsaw, Poland; Level: International Challenge; Format: 64MS/64WS/32MD/32WD/32XD	(Poland) Linling Wang	(Bulgaria) Petya Nedelcheva
March 23	Polish International: Host: Warsaw, Poland; Level: International Challenge; Format: 64MS/64WS/32MD/32WD/32XD	Score: 21–15, 21–14	
March 23	Polish International: Host: Warsaw, Poland; Level: International Challenge; Format: 64MS/64WS/32MD/32WD/32XD	(Chinese Taipei) Chen Hung-ling (Chinese Taipei) Lin Yu-lang	(Denmark) Kasper Faust Henriksen (Denmark) Christian John Skovgaard
March 23	Polish International: Host: Warsaw, Poland; Level: International Challenge; Format: 64MS/64WS/32MD/32WD/32XD	Score: 21–14, 17–21, 21–19	
March 23	Polish International: Host: Warsaw, Poland; Level: International Challenge; Format: 64MS/64WS/32MD/32WD/32XD	(Bulgaria) Diana Dimova (Bulgaria) Petya Nedelcheva	(Netherlands) Rachel van Cutsen (Netherlands) Paulien van Dooremalen
March 23	Polish International: Host: Warsaw, Poland; Level: International Challenge; Format: 64MS/64WS/32MD/32WD/32XD	Score: 21–18, 14–21, 21–16	
March 23	Polish International: Host: Warsaw, Poland; Level: International Challenge; Format: 64MS/64WS/32MD/32WD/32XD	(Poland) Michal Logosz (Poland) Olga Konon	(Poland) Adam Cwalina (Poland) Malgorzata Kurdelska
March 23	Polish International: Host: Warsaw, Poland; Level: International Challenge; Format: 64MS/64WS/32MD/32WD/32XD	Score: 23–25, 21–11, 21–7	
March 23	Giraldilla International: Host: Havana, Cuba; Level: Future Series; Format: 32MS/32WS/16MD/8WD/16XD	(Indonesia) Ari Trisnanto	(Guatemala) Kevin Cordon
March 23	Giraldilla International: Host: Havana, Cuba; Level: Future Series; Format: 32MS/32WS/16MD/8WD/16XD	Score: 19–21, 21–14, 21–18	
March 23	Giraldilla International: Host: Havana, Cuba; Level: Future Series; Format: 32MS/32WS/16MD/8WD/16XD	(Cuba) Solangel Guzman	(Cuba) Maria L Hernandez
March 23	Giraldilla International: Host: Havana, Cuba; Level: Future Series; Format: 32MS/32WS/16MD/8WD/16XD	Score: 21–17, 18–21, 21–18	
March 23	Giraldilla International: Host: Havana, Cuba; Level: Future Series; Format: 32MS/32WS/16MD/8WD/16XD	(Indonesia) Rizki Yanu Kresnayandi (Indonesia) Albert Saputra	(Peru) Antonio de Vinatea (Peru) Martin del Valle
March 23	Giraldilla International: Host: Havana, Cuba; Level: Future Series; Format: 32MS/32WS/16MD/8WD/16XD	Score: 21–10, 21–9	
March 23	Giraldilla International: Host: Havana, Cuba; Level: Future Series; Format: 32MS/32WS/16MD/8WD/16XD	(Cuba) Solangel Guzman (Cuba) Lisandra Suarez	(Peru) Katherine Winder (Peru) Claudia Zornoza
March 23	Giraldilla International: Host: Havana, Cuba; Level: Future Series; Format: 32MS/32WS/16MD/8WD/16XD	Score: 21–14, 26–24	
March 23	Giraldilla International: Host: Havana, Cuba; Level: Future Series; Format: 32MS/32WS/16MD/8WD/16XD	(Cuba) Alexander Hernandez (Cuba) Maria L Hernandez	(Cuba) Osleni Guerrero (Cuba) Solangel Guzman
March 23	Giraldilla International: Host: Havana, Cuba; Level: Future Series; Format: 32MS/32WS/16MD/8WD/16XD	Score: 21–17, 21–12	

=== April ===
Week of	Tournament	Champions	Runners-up
April 1	Osaka International: Host: Osaka, Japan; Level: International Challenge; Format: 32MS/32WS/32MD/32WD/32XD	(South Korea) Lee Cheol-ho	(South Korea) Son Wan-ho
April 1	Osaka International: Host: Osaka, Japan; Level: International Challenge; Format: 32MS/32WS/32MD/32WD/32XD	Score: 19–21, 21–11, 21–11	
April 1	Osaka International: Host: Osaka, Japan; Level: International Challenge; Format: 32MS/32WS/32MD/32WD/32XD	(Japan) Ai Goto	(South Korea) Kim Moon-hi
April 1	Osaka International: Host: Osaka, Japan; Level: International Challenge; Format: 32MS/32WS/32MD/32WD/32XD	Score: 21–14, 21–14	
April 1	Osaka International: Host: Osaka, Japan; Level: International Challenge; Format: 32MS/32WS/32MD/32WD/32XD	(Japan) Yoshiteru Hirobe (Japan) Hajime Komiyama	(Japan) Hirokatsu Hashimoto (Japan) Noriyasu Hirata
April 1	Osaka International: Host: Osaka, Japan; Level: International Challenge; Format: 32MS/32WS/32MD/32WD/32XD	Score: 21–19, 21–10	
April 1	Osaka International: Host: Osaka, Japan; Level: International Challenge; Format: 32MS/32WS/32MD/32WD/32XD	(Japan) Misaki Matsutomo (Japan) Ayaka Takahashi	(Japan) Kaori Mori (Japan) Aya Wakisaka
April 1	Osaka International: Host: Osaka, Japan; Level: International Challenge; Format: 32MS/32WS/32MD/32WD/32XD	Score: 21–16, 16–21, 24–22	
April 1	Osaka International: Host: Osaka, Japan; Level: International Challenge; Format: 32MS/32WS/32MD/32WD/32XD	(Chinese Taipei) Hsieh Yu-hsing (Chinese Taipei) Chien Yu-chin	(Japan) Noriyasu Hirata (Japan) Shizuka Matsuo
April 1	Osaka International: Host: Osaka, Japan; Level: International Challenge; Format: 32MS/32WS/32MD/32WD/32XD	Score: 21–18, 21–15	
April 1	Finnish International: Host: Helsinki, Finland; Level: International Challenge; Format: 32MS/32WS/32MD/32WD/32XD	(Denmark) Peter Mikkelsen	(Germany) Marc Zwiebler
April 1	Finnish International: Host: Helsinki, Finland; Level: International Challenge; Format: 32MS/32WS/32MD/32WD/32XD	Score: 21–14, 16–21, 22–20	
April 1	Finnish International: Host: Helsinki, Finland; Level: International Challenge; Format: 32MS/32WS/32MD/32WD/32XD	(Germany) Juliane Schenk	(Netherlands) Judith Meulendijks
April 1	Finnish International: Host: Helsinki, Finland; Level: International Challenge; Format: 32MS/32WS/32MD/32WD/32XD	Score: 21–13, 21–13	
April 1	Finnish International: Host: Helsinki, Finland; Level: International Challenge; Format: 32MS/32WS/32MD/32WD/32XD	(Chinese Taipei) Chen Hung-ling (Chinese Taipei) Lin Yu-lang	(Denmark) Rasmus Bonde (Denmark) Mikkel Delbo Larsen
April 1	Finnish International: Host: Helsinki, Finland; Level: International Challenge; Format: 32MS/32WS/32MD/32WD/32XD	Score: 21–19, 21–16	
April 1	Finnish International: Host: Helsinki, Finland; Level: International Challenge; Format: 32MS/32WS/32MD/32WD/32XD	(Russia) Valeria Sorokina (Russia) Nina Vislova	(Germany) Sandra Marinello (Germany) Birgit Overzier
April 1	Finnish International: Host: Helsinki, Finland; Level: International Challenge; Format: 32MS/32WS/32MD/32WD/32XD	Score: 16–21, 21–12, 21–13	
April 1	Finnish International: Host: Helsinki, Finland; Level: International Challenge; Format: 32MS/32WS/32MD/32WD/32XD	(Russia) Vitalij Durkin (Russia) Nina Vislova	(England) Robin Middleton (Scotland) Imogen Bankier
April 1	Finnish International: Host: Helsinki, Finland; Level: International Challenge; Format: 32MS/32WS/32MD/32WD/32XD	Score: 21–18, 21–13	
April 6	Badminton Asia Championships (Draw): Host: Suwon, South Korea; Level: Continental Championships; Format: 64MS/32WS/32MD/32WD/32XD	(China) Bao Chunlai	(China) Chen Long
April 6	Badminton Asia Championships (Draw): Host: Suwon, South Korea; Level: Continental Championships; Format: 64MS/32WS/32MD/32WD/32XD	Score: 16–21, 21–10, 21–16	
April 6	Badminton Asia Championships (Draw): Host: Suwon, South Korea; Level: Continental Championships; Format: 64MS/32WS/32MD/32WD/32XD	(China) Zhu Lin	(China) Xie Xingfang
April 6	Badminton Asia Championships (Draw): Host: Suwon, South Korea; Level: Continental Championships; Format: 64MS/32WS/32MD/32WD/32XD	Score: 21–11, 21–10	
April 6	Badminton Asia Championships (Draw): Host: Suwon, South Korea; Level: Continental Championships; Format: 64MS/32WS/32MD/32WD/32XD	(Indonesia) Markis Kido (Indonesia) Hendra Setiawan	(South Korea) Ko Sung-hyun (South Korea) Yoo Yeon-seong
April 6	Badminton Asia Championships (Draw): Host: Suwon, South Korea; Level: Continental Championships; Format: 64MS/32WS/32MD/32WD/32XD	Score: 21–16, 26–24	
April 6	Badminton Asia Championships (Draw): Host: Suwon, South Korea; Level: Continental Championships; Format: 64MS/32WS/32MD/32WD/32XD	(China) Ma Jin (China) Wang Xiaoli	(South Korea) Lee Hyo-jung (South Korea) Lee Kyung-won
April 6	Badminton Asia Championships (Draw): Host: Suwon, South Korea; Level: Continental Championships; Format: 64MS/32WS/32MD/32WD/32XD	Score: 21–11, 21–18	
April 6	Badminton Asia Championships (Draw): Host: Suwon, South Korea; Level: Continental Championships; Format: 64MS/32WS/32MD/32WD/32XD	(South Korea) Lee Yong-dae (South Korea) Lee Hyo-jung	(South Korea) Yoo Yeon-seong (South Korea) Kim Min-jung
April 6	Badminton Asia Championships (Draw): Host: Suwon, South Korea; Level: Continental Championships; Format: 64MS/32WS/32MD/32WD/32XD	Score: 21–12, 21–15	
April 13	Dutch International: Host: Wateringen, Netherlands; Level: International Challenge; Format: 32MS/32WS/32MD/16WD/32XD	(Netherlands) Dicky Palyama	(Netherlands) Eric Pang
April 13	Dutch International: Host: Wateringen, Netherlands; Level: International Challenge; Format: 32MS/32WS/32MD/16WD/32XD	Score: 21–11, 14–21, 21–15	
April 13	Dutch International: Host: Wateringen, Netherlands; Level: International Challenge; Format: 32MS/32WS/32MD/16WD/32XD	(Germany) Juliane Schenk	(Bulgaria) Petya Nedelcheva
April 13	Dutch International: Host: Wateringen, Netherlands; Level: International Challenge; Format: 32MS/32WS/32MD/16WD/32XD	Score: 21–12, 21–16	
April 13	Dutch International: Host: Wateringen, Netherlands; Level: International Challenge; Format: 32MS/32WS/32MD/16WD/32XD	(Denmark) Mads Conrad-Petersen (Denmark) Mads Pieler Kolding	(Netherlands) Ruud Bosch (Netherlands) Koen Ridder
April 13	Dutch International: Host: Wateringen, Netherlands; Level: International Challenge; Format: 32MS/32WS/32MD/16WD/32XD	Score: 21–14, 22–20	
April 13	Dutch International: Host: Wateringen, Netherlands; Level: International Challenge; Format: 32MS/32WS/32MD/16WD/32XD	(Denmark) Line Damkjær Kruse (Denmark) Mie Schjøtt-Kristensen	(Germany) Sandra Marinello (Germany) Birgit Overzier
April 13	Dutch International: Host: Wateringen, Netherlands; Level: International Challenge; Format: 32MS/32WS/32MD/16WD/32XD	Score: 21–19, 21–18	
April 13	Dutch International: Host: Wateringen, Netherlands; Level: International Challenge; Format: 32MS/32WS/32MD/16WD/32XD	(Germany) Johannes Schöttler (Germany) Birgit Overzier	(Denmark) Christian John Skovgaard (Denmark) Anne Skelbæk
April 13	Dutch International: Host: Wateringen, Netherlands; Level: International Challenge; Format: 32MS/32WS/32MD/16WD/32XD	Score: 21–16, 21–10	
April 13	Peru International: Host: Lima, Peru; Level: International Series; Format: 64MS/64WS/32MD/32WD/64XD	(Japan) Kimihiro Yamaguchi	(Cuba) Osleni Guerrero
April 13	Peru International: Host: Lima, Peru; Level: International Series; Format: 64MS/64WS/32MD/32WD/64XD	Score: 21–16, 21–13	
April 13	Peru International: Host: Lima, Peru; Level: International Series; Format: 64MS/64WS/32MD/32WD/64XD	(Peru) Claudia Rivero	(Cuba) Solángel Guzmán
April 13	Peru International: Host: Lima, Peru; Level: International Series; Format: 64MS/64WS/32MD/32WD/64XD	Score: 21–18, 21–15	
April 13	Peru International: Host: Lima, Peru; Level: International Series; Format: 64MS/64WS/32MD/32WD/64XD	(Guatemala) Kevin Cordón (Guatemala) Rodolfo Ramírez	(Spain) José Vicente Martínez (Spain) Javier Tur
April 13	Peru International: Host: Lima, Peru; Level: International Series; Format: 64MS/64WS/32MD/32WD/64XD	Score: 16–21, 8–2 retired	
April 13	Peru International: Host: Lima, Peru; Level: International Series; Format: 64MS/64WS/32MD/32WD/64XD	(Peru) Cristina Aicardi (Peru) Claudia Rivero	(Cuba) Solángel Guzmán (Cuba) Lisandra Suárez
April 13	Peru International: Host: Lima, Peru; Level: International Series; Format: 64MS/64WS/32MD/32WD/64XD	Score: 21–12, 16–21, 21–16	
April 13	Peru International: Host: Lima, Peru; Level: International Series; Format: 64MS/64WS/32MD/32WD/64XD	(Guatemala) Pedro Yang (Spain) Paula Rodríguez	(Peru) Antonio de Vinatea (Peru) Claudia Rivero
April 13	Peru International: Host: Lima, Peru; Level: International Series; Format: 64MS/64WS/32MD/32WD/64XD	Score: 18–21, 21–12, 21–13	
April 13	African Badminton Championships (Draw): Host: Nairobi, Kenya; Level: Continental Championships; Format: 64MS/64WS/32MD/32WD/64XD	(Nigeria) Ola Fagbemi	(Nigeria) Jinkan Ifraimu
April 13	African Badminton Championships (Draw): Host: Nairobi, Kenya; Level: Continental Championships; Format: 64MS/64WS/32MD/32WD/64XD	Score: 21–18, 21–18	
April 13	African Badminton Championships (Draw): Host: Nairobi, Kenya; Level: Continental Championships; Format: 64MS/64WS/32MD/32WD/64XD	(Seychelles) Juliette Ah-Wan	(South Africa) Stacey Doubell
April 13	African Badminton Championships (Draw): Host: Nairobi, Kenya; Level: Continental Championships; Format: 64MS/64WS/32MD/32WD/64XD	Score: 21–15, 21–7	
April 13	African Badminton Championships (Draw): Host: Nairobi, Kenya; Level: Continental Championships; Format: 64MS/64WS/32MD/32WD/64XD	(Nigeria) Jinkan Ifraimu (Nigeria) Ola Fagbemi	(South Africa) Dorian James (South Africa) Chris Dednam
April 13	African Badminton Championships (Draw): Host: Nairobi, Kenya; Level: Continental Championships; Format: 64MS/64WS/32MD/32WD/64XD	Score: 21–13, 21–14	
April 13	African Badminton Championships (Draw): Host: Nairobi, Kenya; Level: Continental Championships; Format: 64MS/64WS/32MD/32WD/64XD	(Nigeria) Grace Daniel (Nigeria) Mary Gideon	(South Africa) Stacey Doubell (South Africa) Kerry-Lee Harrington
April 13	African Badminton Championships (Draw): Host: Nairobi, Kenya; Level: Continental Championships; Format: 64MS/64WS/32MD/32WD/64XD	Score: 21–16, 21–15	
April 13	African Badminton Championships (Draw): Host: Nairobi, Kenya; Level: Continental Championships; Format: 64MS/64WS/32MD/32WD/64XD	(Nigeria) Ola Fagbemi (Nigeria) Grace Daniel	(Seychelles) Georgie Cupidon (Seychelles) Juliette Ah-Wan
April 13	African Badminton Championships (Draw): Host: Nairobi, Kenya; Level: Continental Championships; Format: 64MS/64WS/32MD/32WD/64XD	Score: 18–21, 22–20, 21–16	
April 20	Vietnam International: Host: Hanoi, Vietnam; Level: International Challenge; Format: 64MS/32WS/32MD/32WD/32XD	(Vietnam) Nguyễn Tiến Minh	(Indonesia) Dionysius Hayom Rumbaka
April 20	Vietnam International: Host: Hanoi, Vietnam; Level: International Challenge; Format: 64MS/32WS/32MD/32WD/32XD	Score: 21–13, 21–15	
April 20	Vietnam International: Host: Hanoi, Vietnam; Level: International Challenge; Format: 64MS/32WS/32MD/32WD/32XD	(Thailand) Ratchanok Intanon	(Indonesia) Maria Elfira Christina
April 20	Vietnam International: Host: Hanoi, Vietnam; Level: International Challenge; Format: 64MS/32WS/32MD/32WD/32XD	Score: 21–18, 21–14	
April 20	Vietnam International: Host: Hanoi, Vietnam; Level: International Challenge; Format: 64MS/32WS/32MD/32WD/32XD	(Japan) Takeshi Kamura (Japan) Takuma Ueda	(Malaysia) Chow Pak Chuu (Malaysia) Hong Chieng Hun
April 20	Vietnam International: Host: Hanoi, Vietnam; Level: International Challenge; Format: 64MS/32WS/32MD/32WD/32XD	Score: 21–14, 21–14	
April 20	Vietnam International: Host: Hanoi, Vietnam; Level: International Challenge; Format: 64MS/32WS/32MD/32WD/32XD	(Indonesia) Pia Zebadiah Bernadet (Indonesia) Debby Susanto	(Japan) Yuki Itagaki (Japan) Yui Miyauchi
April 20	Vietnam International: Host: Hanoi, Vietnam; Level: International Challenge; Format: 64MS/32WS/32MD/32WD/32XD	Score: 21–17, 17–21, 21–15	
April 20	Vietnam International: Host: Hanoi, Vietnam; Level: International Challenge; Format: 64MS/32WS/32MD/32WD/32XD	(Indonesia) Tontowi Ahmad (Indonesia) Richi Puspita Dili	(Indonesia) Fran Kurniawan (Indonesia) Pia Zebadiah Bernadet
April 20	Vietnam International: Host: Hanoi, Vietnam; Level: International Challenge; Format: 64MS/32WS/32MD/32WD/32XD	Score: 21–14, 21–8	
April 20	Kenya International: Host: Nairobi, Kenya; Level: International Series; Format: 64MS/64WS/32MD/32WD/64XD	(Iran) Ali Shahhosseini	(Nigeria) Jinkan Ifraimu
April 20	Kenya International: Host: Nairobi, Kenya; Level: International Series; Format: 64MS/64WS/32MD/32WD/64XD	Score: No match	
April 20	Kenya International: Host: Nairobi, Kenya; Level: International Series; Format: 64MS/64WS/32MD/32WD/64XD	(Egypt) Dina Nagy	(Nigeria) Susan Ideh
April 20	Kenya International: Host: Nairobi, Kenya; Level: International Series; Format: 64MS/64WS/32MD/32WD/64XD	Score: 21–8, 21–16	
April 20	Kenya International: Host: Nairobi, Kenya; Level: International Series; Format: 64MS/64WS/32MD/32WD/64XD	(South Africa) Dorian James (South Africa) Chris Dednam	(Nigeria) Ola Fagbemi (Nigeria) Jinkan Ifraimu
April 20	Kenya International: Host: Nairobi, Kenya; Level: International Series; Format: 64MS/64WS/32MD/32WD/64XD	Score: 21–14, 21–13	
April 20	Kenya International: Host: Nairobi, Kenya; Level: International Series; Format: 64MS/64WS/32MD/32WD/64XD	(India) Dhanya Nair (India) Anita Ohlan	(South Africa) Michelle Edwards (South Africa) Annari Viljoen
April 20	Kenya International: Host: Nairobi, Kenya; Level: International Series; Format: 64MS/64WS/32MD/32WD/64XD	Score: 17–21, 21–15, 23–21	
April 20	Kenya International: Host: Nairobi, Kenya; Level: International Series; Format: 64MS/64WS/32MD/32WD/64XD	(South Africa) Chris Dednam (South Africa) Michelle Edwards	(South Africa) Dorian James (South Africa) Annari Viljoen
April 20	Kenya International: Host: Nairobi, Kenya; Level: International Series; Format: 64MS/64WS/32MD/32WD/64XD	Score: 21–11, 21–13	
April 27	Canadian International: Host: Quebec, Canada; Level: International Challenge; Format: 32MS/32WS/32MD/16WD/32XD	(England) Rajiv Ouseph	(England) Carl Baxter
April 27	Canadian International: Host: Quebec, Canada; Level: International Challenge; Format: 32MS/32WS/32MD/16WD/32XD	Score: 21–11, 21–19	
April 27	Canadian International: Host: Quebec, Canada; Level: International Challenge; Format: 32MS/32WS/32MD/16WD/32XD	(Japan) Nozomi Kametani	(Japan) Yasuyo Imabeppu
April 27	Canadian International: Host: Quebec, Canada; Level: International Challenge; Format: 32MS/32WS/32MD/16WD/32XD	Score: 21–8, 21–7	
April 27	Canadian International: Host: Quebec, Canada; Level: International Challenge; Format: 32MS/32WS/32MD/16WD/32XD	(Japan) Naoki Kawamae (Japan) Shoji Sato	(Canada) Alvin Lau (Canada) Chi-lin Li
April 27	Canadian International: Host: Quebec, Canada; Level: International Challenge; Format: 32MS/32WS/32MD/16WD/32XD	Score: 21–15, 21–12	
April 27	Canadian International: Host: Quebec, Canada; Level: International Challenge; Format: 32MS/32WS/32MD/16WD/32XD	(Japan) Aki Akao (Japan) Yasuyo Imabeppu	(Canada) Stephanie Ko (Canada) Melody Liang
April 27	Canadian International: Host: Quebec, Canada; Level: International Challenge; Format: 32MS/32WS/32MD/16WD/32XD	Score: 21–9, 21–12	
April 27	Canadian International: Host: Quebec, Canada; Level: International Challenge; Format: 32MS/32WS/32MD/16WD/32XD	(Canada) Kevin Cao (Canada) Melody Liang	(South Korea) Lee Heang-ham (Canada) Fiona McKee
April 27	Canadian International: Host: Quebec, Canada; Level: International Challenge; Format: 32MS/32WS/32MD/16WD/32XD	Score: 21–10, 21–12	
April 27	Smiling Fish International: Host: Trang, Thailand; Level: International Series; Format: 64MS/32WS/32MD/32WD/32XD	(Thailand) Tanongsak Saensomboonsuk	(India) Kashyap Parupalli
April 27	Smiling Fish International: Host: Trang, Thailand; Level: International Series; Format: 64MS/32WS/32MD/32WD/32XD	Score: 23–21, 21–14	
April 27	Smiling Fish International: Host: Trang, Thailand; Level: International Series; Format: 64MS/32WS/32MD/32WD/32XD	(Thailand) Porntip Buranaprasertsuk	(Thailand) Chanida Julrattanamanee
April 27	Smiling Fish International: Host: Trang, Thailand; Level: International Series; Format: 64MS/32WS/32MD/32WD/32XD	Score: 21–18, 21–18	
April 27	Smiling Fish International: Host: Trang, Thailand; Level: International Series; Format: 64MS/32WS/32MD/32WD/32XD	(Thailand) Bodin Isara (Thailand) Maneepong Jongjit	(Thailand) Songphon Anugritayawon (Thailand) Nitipong Saengsila
April 27	Smiling Fish International: Host: Trang, Thailand; Level: International Series; Format: 64MS/32WS/32MD/32WD/32XD	Score: 21–12, 21–12	
April 27	Smiling Fish International: Host: Trang, Thailand; Level: International Series; Format: 64MS/32WS/32MD/32WD/32XD	(Thailand) Porntip Buranaprasertsuk (Thailand) Sapsiree Taerattanachai	(India) P. C. Thulasi (India) N. Sikki Reddy
April 27	Smiling Fish International: Host: Trang, Thailand; Level: International Series; Format: 64MS/32WS/32MD/32WD/32XD	Score: 21–19, 21–17	
April 27	Smiling Fish International: Host: Trang, Thailand; Level: International Series; Format: 64MS/32WS/32MD/32WD/32XD	(Thailand) Patiphat Chalardchaleam (Thailand) Savitree Amitrapai	(Thailand) Thitipong Lapho (Thailand) Vacharaporn Munkit
April 27	Smiling Fish International: Host: Trang, Thailand; Level: International Series; Format: 64MS/32WS/32MD/32WD/32XD	Score: 21–10, 21–19	
April 27	Portugal International: Host: Caldas da Rainha, Portugal; Level: International Series; Format: 32MS/32WS/32MD/32WD/32XD	(Sweden) Magnus Sahlberg	(Denmark) Christian Lind Thomsen
April 27	Portugal International: Host: Caldas da Rainha, Portugal; Level: International Series; Format: 32MS/32WS/32MD/32WD/32XD	Score: 21–11, 21–16	
April 27	Portugal International: Host: Caldas da Rainha, Portugal; Level: International Series; Format: 32MS/32WS/32MD/32WD/32XD	(England) Jill Pittard	(Portugal) Telma Santos
April 27	Portugal International: Host: Caldas da Rainha, Portugal; Level: International Series; Format: 32MS/32WS/32MD/32WD/32XD	Score: 21–16, 21–14	
April 27	Portugal International: Host: Caldas da Rainha, Portugal; Level: International Series; Format: 32MS/32WS/32MD/32WD/32XD	(Spain) Ruben Gordown Khosadalina (Spain) Stenny Kusuma	(France) Laurent Constantin (France) Sébastien Vincent
April 27	Portugal International: Host: Caldas da Rainha, Portugal; Level: International Series; Format: 32MS/32WS/32MD/32WD/32XD	Score: 21–12, 21–11	
April 27	Portugal International: Host: Caldas da Rainha, Portugal; Level: International Series; Format: 32MS/32WS/32MD/32WD/32XD	(Sweden) Emelie Lennartsson (Sweden) Emma Wengberg	(Finland) Sanni Rautala (Finland) Noora Virta
April 27	Portugal International: Host: Caldas da Rainha, Portugal; Level: International Series; Format: 32MS/32WS/32MD/32WD/32XD	Score: 21–10, 20–22, 21–12	
April 27	Portugal International: Host: Caldas da Rainha, Portugal; Level: International Series; Format: 32MS/32WS/32MD/32WD/32XD	(Poland) Łukasz Moreń (Poland) Natalia Pocztowiak	(Russia) Nikita Khakimov (Russia) Liubov Chudentseva
April 27	Portugal International: Host: Caldas da Rainha, Portugal; Level: International Series; Format: 32MS/32WS/32MD/32WD/32XD	Score: 21–13, 21–14	

=== May ===
Week of	Tournament	Champions	Runners-up
May 4	Sudirman Cup (Draw): Host: Guangzhou, China; Level: World Mixed Team Championships; Format: 8 Teams (Round robin)	China; Players: Bao Chunlai, Cai Yun, Chai Biao, Chen Jin, Chen Long, Fu Haifeng, Guo Zhendong, He Hanbin, Lin Dan, Shen Ye, Sun Junjie, Xie Zhongbo, Xu Chen, Zheng Bo, Cheng Shu, Du Jing, Lu Lan, Ma Jin, Pan Pan, Tian Qing, Wang Lin, Wang Yihan, Xie Xingfang, Yu Yang, Zhang Yawen, Zhao Tingting, Zhao Yunlei	South Korea; Players: Han Sang-hoon, Hwang Ji-man, Jang Young-soo, Jung Jae-sung, Lee Yong-dae, Park Sung-hwan, Shin Baek-cheol, Yoo Yeon-seong, Ha Jung-eun, Hwang Hye-youn, Kim Min-jung, Kim Moon-hi, Lee Hyo-jung, Lee Kyung-won
May 4	Sudirman Cup (Draw): Host: Guangzhou, China; Level: World Mixed Team Championships; Format: 8 Teams (Round robin)	Score: 3–0	
May 11	Slovenian International: Host: Lendava, Slovenia; Level: International Series; Format: 32MS/32WS/32MD/16WD/32XD	(England) Harry Wright	(Denmark) Kristian Midtgaard
May 11	Slovenian International: Host: Lendava, Slovenia; Level: International Series; Format: 32MS/32WS/32MD/16WD/32XD	Score: 21–10, 21–17	
May 11	Slovenian International: Host: Lendava, Slovenia; Level: International Series; Format: 32MS/32WS/32MD/16WD/32XD	(Slovenia) Maja Tvrdy	(Belgium) Lianne Tan
May 11	Slovenian International: Host: Lendava, Slovenia; Level: International Series; Format: 32MS/32WS/32MD/16WD/32XD	Score: 21–10, 21–16	
May 11	Slovenian International: Host: Lendava, Slovenia; Level: International Series; Format: 32MS/32WS/32MD/16WD/32XD	(Austria) Jürgen Koch (Austria) Peter Zauner	(Austria) Daniel Grassmück (Austria) Roman Zirnwald
May 11	Slovenian International: Host: Lendava, Slovenia; Level: International Series; Format: 32MS/32WS/32MD/16WD/32XD	Score: 21–18, 21–14	
May 11	Slovenian International: Host: Lendava, Slovenia; Level: International Series; Format: 32MS/32WS/32MD/16WD/32XD	(Germany) Johanna Goliszewski (Germany) Claudia Vogelgsang	(Denmark) Lotte Bonde (Denmark) Louise Hansen
May 11	Slovenian International: Host: Lendava, Slovenia; Level: International Series; Format: 32MS/32WS/32MD/16WD/32XD	Score: 21–18, 21–15	
May 11	Slovenian International: Host: Lendava, Slovenia; Level: International Series; Format: 32MS/32WS/32MD/16WD/32XD	(Austria) Peter Zauner (Austria) Simone Prutsch	(Denmark) Martin Kragh (Denmark) Louise Hansen
May 11	Slovenian International: Host: Lendava, Slovenia; Level: International Series; Format: 32MS/32WS/32MD/16WD/32XD	Score: 21–23, 21–17, 21–17	
May 18	Spanish Open: Host: Madrid, Spain; Level: International Challenge; Format: 32MS/32WS/32MD/32WD/32XD	(Denmark) Hans-Kristian Vittinghus	(India) Kashyap Parupalli
May 18	Spanish Open: Host: Madrid, Spain; Level: International Challenge; Format: 32MS/32WS/32MD/32WD/32XD	Score: 21–10, 21–16	
May 18	Spanish Open: Host: Madrid, Spain; Level: International Challenge; Format: 32MS/32WS/32MD/32WD/32XD	(India) Sayali Gokhale	(Belgium) Lianne Tan
May 18	Spanish Open: Host: Madrid, Spain; Level: International Challenge; Format: 32MS/32WS/32MD/32WD/32XD	Score: 21–9, 21–18	
May 18	Spanish Open: Host: Madrid, Spain; Level: International Challenge; Format: 32MS/32WS/32MD/32WD/32XD	(Denmark) Rasmus Bonde (Denmark) Mikkel Delbo Larsen	(England) Dean George (England) Chris Langridge
May 18	Spanish Open: Host: Madrid, Spain; Level: International Challenge; Format: 32MS/32WS/32MD/32WD/32XD	Score: 26–24, 23–21	
May 18	Spanish Open: Host: Madrid, Spain; Level: International Challenge; Format: 32MS/32WS/32MD/32WD/32XD	(Denmark) Line Damkjær Kruse (Denmark) Mie Schjøtt-Kristensen	(India) Aparna Balan (India) Shruti Kurian
May 18	Spanish Open: Host: Madrid, Spain; Level: International Challenge; Format: 32MS/32WS/32MD/32WD/32XD	Score: 21–14, 17–21, 21–15	
May 18	Spanish Open: Host: Madrid, Spain; Level: International Challenge; Format: 32MS/32WS/32MD/32WD/32XD	(England) Robin Middleton (England) Mariana Agathangelou	(India) Arun Vishnu (India) Aparna Balan
May 18	Spanish Open: Host: Madrid, Spain; Level: International Challenge; Format: 32MS/32WS/32MD/32WD/32XD	Score: 21–16, 21–15	
May 25	Le Volant d'Or de Toulouse: Host: Toulouse, France; Level: International Challenge; Format: 32MS/32WS/32MD/32WD/32XD	(England) Rajiv Ouseph	(India) Kashyap Parupalli
May 25	Le Volant d'Or de Toulouse: Host: Toulouse, France; Level: International Challenge; Format: 32MS/32WS/32MD/32WD/32XD	Score: 21–11, 21–12	
May 25	Le Volant d'Or de Toulouse: Host: Toulouse, France; Level: International Challenge; Format: 32MS/32WS/32MD/32WD/32XD	(Russia) Ella Diehl	(England) Jill Pittard
May 25	Le Volant d'Or de Toulouse: Host: Toulouse, France; Level: International Challenge; Format: 32MS/32WS/32MD/32WD/32XD	Score: 21–8, 21–13	
May 25	Le Volant d'Or de Toulouse: Host: Toulouse, France; Level: International Challenge; Format: 32MS/32WS/32MD/32WD/32XD	(England) Chris Langridge (England) Robin Middleton	(Denmark) Rasmus Bonde (Denmark) Mikkel Delbo Larsen
May 25	Le Volant d'Or de Toulouse: Host: Toulouse, France; Level: International Challenge; Format: 32MS/32WS/32MD/32WD/32XD	Score: 21–11, 21–19	
May 25	Le Volant d'Or de Toulouse: Host: Toulouse, France; Level: International Challenge; Format: 32MS/32WS/32MD/32WD/32XD	(Russia) Valeri Sorokina (Russia) Nina Vislova	(France) Laura Choinet (France) Weny Rahmawati
May 25	Le Volant d'Or de Toulouse: Host: Toulouse, France; Level: International Challenge; Format: 32MS/32WS/32MD/32WD/32XD	Score: 21–12, 15–21, 21–9	
May 25	Le Volant d'Or de Toulouse: Host: Toulouse, France; Level: International Challenge; Format: 32MS/32WS/32MD/32WD/32XD	(Poland) Robert Mateusiak (Poland) Nadieżda Kostiuczyk	(Denmark) Rasmus Bonde (Denmark) Britta Andersen
May 25	Le Volant d'Or de Toulouse: Host: Toulouse, France; Level: International Challenge; Format: 32MS/32WS/32MD/32WD/32XD	Score: 21–10, 21–11	

=== June ===
Week of	Tournament	Champions	Runners-up
June 1	Badminton Europe Circuit Finals: Host: Assen, Netherlands; Format: 6MS/6WS (Round robin) 2MD/2WD/2XD 2U19MS/2U19WS	(England) Rajiv Ouseph	(Estonia) Raul Must
June 1	Badminton Europe Circuit Finals: Host: Assen, Netherlands; Format: 6MS/6WS (Round robin) 2MD/2WD/2XD 2U19MS/2U19WS	Score: 21–19, 22–20	
June 1	Badminton Europe Circuit Finals: Host: Assen, Netherlands; Format: 6MS/6WS (Round robin) 2MD/2WD/2XD 2U19MS/2U19WS	(Netherlands) Rachel van Cutsen	(Germany) Juliane Schenk
June 1	Badminton Europe Circuit Finals: Host: Assen, Netherlands; Format: 6MS/6WS (Round robin) 2MD/2WD/2XD 2U19MS/2U19WS	Score: 24–22, 21–17	
June 1	Badminton Europe Circuit Finals: Host: Assen, Netherlands; Format: 6MS/6WS (Round robin) 2MD/2WD/2XD 2U19MS/2U19WS	(Austria) Jurgen Koch (Austria) Peter Zauner	(Denmark) Kasper Henriksen (Denmark) Christian Skovgaard
June 1	Badminton Europe Circuit Finals: Host: Assen, Netherlands; Format: 6MS/6WS (Round robin) 2MD/2WD/2XD 2U19MS/2U19WS	Score: 22–20, 22–24, 21–19	
June 1	Badminton Europe Circuit Finals: Host: Assen, Netherlands; Format: 6MS/6WS (Round robin) 2MD/2WD/2XD 2U19MS/2U19WS	(Sweden) Emelie Lennartsson (Sweden) Emma Wengberg	(Netherlands) Rachel van Cutsen (Netherlands) Paulien van Dooremalen
June 1	Badminton Europe Circuit Finals: Host: Assen, Netherlands; Format: 6MS/6WS (Round robin) 2MD/2WD/2XD 2U19MS/2U19WS	Score: 21–18, 21–19	
June 1	Badminton Europe Circuit Finals: Host: Assen, Netherlands; Format: 6MS/6WS (Round robin) 2MD/2WD/2XD 2U19MS/2U19WS	(Russia) Vitalij Durkin (Russia) Nina Vislova	(Ukraine) Valeriy Atrashchenkov (Ukraine) Elena Prus
June 1	Badminton Europe Circuit Finals: Host: Assen, Netherlands; Format: 6MS/6WS (Round robin) 2MD/2WD/2XD 2U19MS/2U19WS	Score: 21–18, 21–16	
June 1	Badminton Europe Circuit Finals: Host: Assen, Netherlands; Format: 6MS/6WS (Round robin) 2MD/2WD/2XD 2U19MS/2U19WS	(France) Alexandre Francoise	(Austria) Luka Wraber
June 1	Badminton Europe Circuit Finals: Host: Assen, Netherlands; Format: 6MS/6WS (Round robin) 2MD/2WD/2XD 2U19MS/2U19WS	Score: 21–19, 19–21, 21–18	
June 1	Badminton Europe Circuit Finals: Host: Assen, Netherlands; Format: 6MS/6WS (Round robin) 2MD/2WD/2XD 2U19MS/2U19WS	(Russia) Natalia Perminova	(Russia) Romina Gabdullina
June 1	Badminton Europe Circuit Finals: Host: Assen, Netherlands; Format: 6MS/6WS (Round robin) 2MD/2WD/2XD 2U19MS/2U19WS	Score: 22–20, 21–17	
June 8	Singapore Open (Draw): Host: Singapore; Level: Superseries; Format: 32MS/32WS/32MD/32WD/32XD	(China) Bao Chunlai	(Thailand) Boonsak Ponsana
June 8	Singapore Open (Draw): Host: Singapore; Level: Superseries; Format: 32MS/32WS/32MD/32WD/32XD	Score: 21–19, 16–21, 21–15	
June 8	Singapore Open (Draw): Host: Singapore; Level: Superseries; Format: 32MS/32WS/32MD/32WD/32XD	(Hong Kong) Zhou Mi	(China) Xie Xingfang
June 8	Singapore Open (Draw): Host: Singapore; Level: Superseries; Format: 32MS/32WS/32MD/32WD/32XD	Score: 21–19, 18–21, 21–10	
June 8	Singapore Open (Draw): Host: Singapore; Level: Superseries; Format: 32MS/32WS/32MD/32WD/32XD	(England) Anthony Clark (England) Nathan Robertson	(Indonesia) Markis Kido (Indonesia) Hendra Setiawan
June 8	Singapore Open (Draw): Host: Singapore; Level: Superseries; Format: 32MS/32WS/32MD/32WD/32XD	Score: 21–12, 21–11	
June 8	Singapore Open (Draw): Host: Singapore; Level: Superseries; Format: 32MS/32WS/32MD/32WD/32XD	(China) Zhang Yawen (China) Zhao Tingting	(Indonesia) Nitya Krishinda Maheswari (Indonesia) Greysia Polii
June 8	Singapore Open (Draw): Host: Singapore; Level: Superseries; Format: 32MS/32WS/32MD/32WD/32XD	Score: 21–14, 21–13	
June 8	Singapore Open (Draw): Host: Singapore; Level: Superseries; Format: 32MS/32WS/32MD/32WD/32XD	(China) Zheng Bo (China) Ma Jin	(China) Xie Zhongbo (China) Zhang Yawen
June 8	Singapore Open (Draw): Host: Singapore; Level: Superseries; Format: 32MS/32WS/32MD/32WD/32XD	Score: 19–21, 21–19, 21–11	
June 15	Indonesia Open (Draw): Host: Jakarta, Indonesia; Level: Superseries; Format: 32MS/32WS/32MD/32WD/32XD	(Malaysia) Lee Chong Wei	(Indonesia) Taufik Hidayat
June 15	Indonesia Open (Draw): Host: Jakarta, Indonesia; Level: Superseries; Format: 32MS/32WS/32MD/32WD/32XD	Score: 21–9, 21–14	
June 15	Indonesia Open (Draw): Host: Jakarta, Indonesia; Level: Superseries; Format: 32MS/32WS/32MD/32WD/32XD	(India) Saina Nehwal	(China) Wang Lin
June 15	Indonesia Open (Draw): Host: Jakarta, Indonesia; Level: Superseries; Format: 32MS/32WS/32MD/32WD/32XD	Score: 12–21, 21–18, 21–9	
June 15	Indonesia Open (Draw): Host: Jakarta, Indonesia; Level: Superseries; Format: 32MS/32WS/32MD/32WD/32XD	(South Korea) Jung Jae-sung (South Korea) Lee Yong-dae	(China) Cai Yun (China) Fu Haifeng
June 15	Indonesia Open (Draw): Host: Jakarta, Indonesia; Level: Superseries; Format: 32MS/32WS/32MD/32WD/32XD	Score: 21–15, 21–18	
June 15	Indonesia Open (Draw): Host: Jakarta, Indonesia; Level: Superseries; Format: 32MS/32WS/32MD/32WD/32XD	(Malaysia) Chin Eei Hui (Malaysia) Wong Pei Tty	(China) Cheng Shu (China) Zhao Yunlei
June 15	Indonesia Open (Draw): Host: Jakarta, Indonesia; Level: Superseries; Format: 32MS/32WS/32MD/32WD/32XD	Score: 21–16, 21–16	
June 15	Indonesia Open (Draw): Host: Jakarta, Indonesia; Level: Superseries; Format: 32MS/32WS/32MD/32WD/32XD	(China) Zheng Bo (China) Ma Jin	(South Korea) Lee Yong-dae (South Korea) Lee Hyo-jung
June 15	Indonesia Open (Draw): Host: Jakarta, Indonesia; Level: Superseries; Format: 32MS/32WS/32MD/32WD/32XD	Score: 21–17, 8–21, 21–16	
June 15	Auckland International: Host: Auckland, New Zealand; Level: International Series; Format: 32MS/32WS/16MD/32WD/32XD	(Indonesia) Riyanto Subagja	(New Zealand) Joe Wu
June 15	Auckland International: Host: Auckland, New Zealand; Level: International Series; Format: 32MS/32WS/16MD/32WD/32XD	Score: 14–21, 21–16, 21–10	
June 15	Auckland International: Host: Auckland, New Zealand; Level: International Series; Format: 32MS/32WS/16MD/32WD/32XD	(Indonesia) Febby Angguni	(Indonesia) Rosaria Yusfin Pungkasari
June 15	Auckland International: Host: Auckland, New Zealand; Level: International Series; Format: 32MS/32WS/16MD/32WD/32XD	Score: 21–15, 21–16	
June 15	Auckland International: Host: Auckland, New Zealand; Level: International Series; Format: 32MS/32WS/16MD/32WD/32XD	(Indonesia) Berry Angriawan (Indonesia) Muhammad Ulinnuha	(Indonesia) Didit Juang Indrianto (Indonesia) Seiko Wahyu Kusdianto
June 15	Auckland International: Host: Auckland, New Zealand; Level: International Series; Format: 32MS/32WS/16MD/32WD/32XD	Score: 21–14, 21–19	
June 15	Auckland International: Host: Auckland, New Zealand; Level: International Series; Format: 32MS/32WS/16MD/32WD/32XD	(Indonesia) Jenna Gozali (Indonesia) Rufika Olivta	(New Zealand) Michelle Chan (New Zealand) Rachel Hindley
June 15	Auckland International: Host: Auckland, New Zealand; Level: International Series; Format: 32MS/32WS/16MD/32WD/32XD	Score: 21–16, 21–11	
June 15	Auckland International: Host: Auckland, New Zealand; Level: International Series; Format: 32MS/32WS/16MD/32WD/32XD	(Australia) Glenn Warfe (Australia) Renuga Veeran	(Australia) Chad Whitehead (Australia) Eugenia Tanaka
June 15	Auckland International: Host: Auckland, New Zealand; Level: International Series; Format: 32MS/32WS/16MD/32WD/32XD	Score: 21–12, 21–15	
June 15	European University Championships: Host: Geneva, Switzerland; Format: 64MS/64WS/32MD/32WD/32XD	(Poland) Przemyslaw Wacha	(Ukraine) Dmytro Zavadsky
June 15	European University Championships: Host: Geneva, Switzerland; Format: 64MS/64WS/32MD/32WD/32XD	Score: 21–17, 21–19	
June 15	European University Championships: Host: Geneva, Switzerland; Format: 64MS/64WS/32MD/32WD/32XD	(Poland) Olga Konon	(Ukraine) Mariya Diptan
June 15	European University Championships: Host: Geneva, Switzerland; Format: 64MS/64WS/32MD/32WD/32XD	Score: 21–13, 21–15	
June 15	European University Championships: Host: Geneva, Switzerland; Format: 64MS/64WS/32MD/32WD/32XD	(Germany) Peter Kasbauer (Germany) Oliver Roth	(Poland) Lukasz Moren (Poland) Michal Rogalski
June 15	European University Championships: Host: Geneva, Switzerland; Format: 64MS/64WS/32MD/32WD/32XD	Score: 21–10, 19–21, 21–11	
June 15	European University Championships: Host: Geneva, Switzerland; Format: 64MS/64WS/32MD/32WD/32XD	(Poland) Olga Konon (Poland) Agnieszka Wojtkowska	(Poland) Malgorzata Kurdelska (Poland) Natalia Pocztowiak
June 15	European University Championships: Host: Geneva, Switzerland; Format: 64MS/64WS/32MD/32WD/32XD	Score: 21–17, 21–19	
June 15	European University Championships: Host: Geneva, Switzerland; Format: 64MS/64WS/32MD/32WD/32XD	(England) Tom Armstrong (England) Jenny Day	(Poland) Lukasz Moren (Poland) Agnieszka Wojtkowska
June 15	European University Championships: Host: Geneva, Switzerland; Format: 64MS/64WS/32MD/32WD/32XD	Score: 28–26, 21–11	
June 22	Malaysia Open Grand Prix Gold: Host: Johor Bahru, Malaysia; Level: Grand Prix Gold; Format: 64MS/32WS/32MD/32WD/32XD	(Malaysia) Lee Chong Wei	(China) Chen Long
June 22	Malaysia Open Grand Prix Gold: Host: Johor Bahru, Malaysia; Level: Grand Prix Gold; Format: 64MS/32WS/32MD/32WD/32XD	Score: 21–16, 21–9	
June 22	Malaysia Open Grand Prix Gold: Host: Johor Bahru, Malaysia; Level: Grand Prix Gold; Format: 64MS/32WS/32MD/32WD/32XD	(China) Wang Shixian	(China) Wang Xin
June 22	Malaysia Open Grand Prix Gold: Host: Johor Bahru, Malaysia; Level: Grand Prix Gold; Format: 64MS/32WS/32MD/32WD/32XD	Score: 21–16, 18–21, 21–10	
June 22	Malaysia Open Grand Prix Gold: Host: Johor Bahru, Malaysia; Level: Grand Prix Gold; Format: 64MS/32WS/32MD/32WD/32XD	(Malaysia) Koo Kien Keat (Malaysia) Tan Boon Heong	(Malaysia) Gan Teik Chai (Malaysia) Tan Bin Shen
June 22	Malaysia Open Grand Prix Gold: Host: Johor Bahru, Malaysia; Level: Grand Prix Gold; Format: 64MS/32WS/32MD/32WD/32XD	Score: 21–11, 21–13	
June 22	Malaysia Open Grand Prix Gold: Host: Johor Bahru, Malaysia; Level: Grand Prix Gold; Format: 64MS/32WS/32MD/32WD/32XD	(China) Ma Jin (China) Wang Xiaoli	(Malaysia) Chin Eei Hui (Malaysia) Wong Pei Tty
June 22	Malaysia Open Grand Prix Gold: Host: Johor Bahru, Malaysia; Level: Grand Prix Gold; Format: 64MS/32WS/32MD/32WD/32XD	Score: 21–9, 21–11	
June 22	Malaysia Open Grand Prix Gold: Host: Johor Bahru, Malaysia; Level: Grand Prix Gold; Format: 64MS/32WS/32MD/32WD/32XD	(China) Zheng Bo (China) Ma Jin	(China) Xu Chen (China) Zhao Yunlei
June 22	Malaysia Open Grand Prix Gold: Host: Johor Bahru, Malaysia; Level: Grand Prix Gold; Format: 64MS/32WS/32MD/32WD/32XD	Score: 5–5 Retired	
June 22	European Cup: Host: Sofia, Bulgaria; Level: Continental Club Championships; Format: 20 Teams (Round robin)	(Russia) Favorit-Ramenskoe; Players: Andrey Ashmarin, Valeriy Atrashchenkov, Vladimir Ivanov, Aleksandr Nikolaenko, Kamila Augustyn, Tatjana Bibik, Ksenia Polikarpova, Elena Prus	(France) Issy Les Moulineaux; Players: Fabrice Bernabé, Arif Rasidi, Agus Sugimin, Yoann Turlan, Sébastien Vincent, Vidre Wibowo, Elisa Chanteur, Perrine Lebuhanic, Julie Leverdez, Maily Prevot, Weny Rahmawati
June 22	European Cup: Host: Sofia, Bulgaria; Level: Continental Club Championships; Format: 20 Teams (Round robin)	Score: 4–2	
June 22	Victorian International: Host: Melbourne, Australia; Level: Future Series; Format: 32MS/32WS/32MD/16WD/32XD	(Indonesia) Marcus Fernaldi Gideon	(New Zealand) Joe Wu
June 22	Victorian International: Host: Melbourne, Australia; Level: Future Series; Format: 32MS/32WS/32MD/16WD/32XD	Score: 17–21, 21–8, 21–15	
June 22	Victorian International: Host: Melbourne, Australia; Level: Future Series; Format: 32MS/32WS/32MD/16WD/32XD	(Australia) Renuga Veeran	(Australia) Leisha Cooper
June 22	Victorian International: Host: Melbourne, Australia; Level: Future Series; Format: 32MS/32WS/32MD/16WD/32XD	Score: 21–15, 21–13	
June 22	Victorian International: Host: Melbourne, Australia; Level: Future Series; Format: 32MS/32WS/32MD/16WD/32XD	(Australia) Benjamin Walklate (Australia) Glenn Warfe	(Australia) Ben McCarthy (Australia) Raj Veeran
June 22	Victorian International: Host: Melbourne, Australia; Level: Future Series; Format: 32MS/32WS/32MD/16WD/32XD	Score: 21–15, 21–19	
June 22	Victorian International: Host: Melbourne, Australia; Level: Future Series; Format: 32MS/32WS/32MD/16WD/32XD	(Australia) Erin Carroll (Australia) Renuga Veeran	(New Zealand) Danielle Barry (New Zealand) Donna Haliday
June 22	Victorian International: Host: Melbourne, Australia; Level: Future Series; Format: 32MS/32WS/32MD/16WD/32XD	Score: 16–21, 21–19, 22–20	
June 22	Victorian International: Host: Melbourne, Australia; Level: Future Series; Format: 32MS/32WS/32MD/16WD/32XD	(Australia) Raj Veeran (Australia) Renuga Veeran	(New Zealand) Henry Tam (New Zealand) Donna Haliday
June 22	Victorian International: Host: Melbourne, Australia; Level: Future Series; Format: 32MS/32WS/32MD/16WD/32XD	Score: 21–12, 21–15	
June 22	Mauritius International: Host: Port Louis, Mauritius; Level: International Series; Format: 64MS/16WS/32MD/8WD/16XD	(Czech Republic) Jan Frohlich	(France) Maxime Mora
June 22	Mauritius International: Host: Port Louis, Mauritius; Level: International Series; Format: 64MS/16WS/32MD/8WD/16XD	Score: Walkover	
June 22	Mauritius International: Host: Port Louis, Mauritius; Level: International Series; Format: 64MS/16WS/32MD/8WD/16XD	(Nigeria) Grace Daniel	(Seychelles) Juliette Ah-Wan
June 22	Mauritius International: Host: Port Louis, Mauritius; Level: International Series; Format: 64MS/16WS/32MD/8WD/16XD	Score: 21–13, 21–17	
June 22	Mauritius International: Host: Port Louis, Mauritius; Level: International Series; Format: 64MS/16WS/32MD/8WD/16XD	(South Africa) Dorian James (South Africa) Willem Viljoen	(Nigeria) Ola Fagbemi (Nigeria) Jinkan Ifraimu
June 22	Mauritius International: Host: Port Louis, Mauritius; Level: International Series; Format: 64MS/16WS/32MD/8WD/16XD	Score: 19–21, 22–20, 21–8	
June 22	Mauritius International: Host: Port Louis, Mauritius; Level: International Series; Format: 64MS/16WS/32MD/8WD/16XD	(Nigeria) Susan Ideh (Seychelles) Juliette Ah-Wan	(Mauritius) Shama Aboobakar (Mauritius) Amrita Sawaram
June 22	Mauritius International: Host: Port Louis, Mauritius; Level: International Series; Format: 64MS/16WS/32MD/8WD/16XD	Score: 21–18, 21–17	
June 22	Mauritius International: Host: Port Louis, Mauritius; Level: International Series; Format: 64MS/16WS/32MD/8WD/16XD	(Nigeria) Ola Fagbemi (Nigeria) Grace Daniel	(Seychelles) Georgie Cupidon (Seychelles) Juliette Ah-Wan
June 22	Mauritius International: Host: Port Louis, Mauritius; Level: International Series; Format: 64MS/16WS/32MD/8WD/16XD	Score: 21–17, 21–16	
June 29	Philippines Open: Host: Manila, Philippines; Level: Grand Prix Gold; Format: 64MS/32WS/32MD/32WD/32XD	(China) Chen Long	(Hong Kong) Hu Yun
June 29	Philippines Open: Host: Manila, Philippines; Level: Grand Prix Gold; Format: 64MS/32WS/32MD/32WD/32XD	Score: 21–13, 21–6	
June 29	Philippines Open: Host: Manila, Philippines; Level: Grand Prix Gold; Format: 64MS/32WS/32MD/32WD/32XD	(China) Wang Xin	(Hong Kong) Zhou Mi
June 29	Philippines Open: Host: Manila, Philippines; Level: Grand Prix Gold; Format: 64MS/32WS/32MD/32WD/32XD	Score: 21–10, 12–21, 23–21	
June 29	Philippines Open: Host: Manila, Philippines; Level: Grand Prix Gold; Format: 64MS/32WS/32MD/32WD/32XD	(Indonesia) Mohammad Ahsan (Indonesia) Bona Septano	(Indonesia) Alvent Yulianto Chandra (Indonesia) Hendra Aprida Gunawan
June 29	Philippines Open: Host: Manila, Philippines; Level: Grand Prix Gold; Format: 64MS/32WS/32MD/32WD/32XD	Score: 10–21, 21–14, 21–17	
June 29	Philippines Open: Host: Manila, Philippines; Level: Grand Prix Gold; Format: 64MS/32WS/32MD/32WD/32XD	(China) Gao Ling (China) Wei Yili	(Indonesia) Shendy Puspa Irawati (Indonesia) Meiliana Jauhari
June 29	Philippines Open: Host: Manila, Philippines; Level: Grand Prix Gold; Format: 64MS/32WS/32MD/32WD/32XD	Score: 21–11, 21–11	
June 29	Philippines Open: Host: Manila, Philippines; Level: Grand Prix Gold; Format: 64MS/32WS/32MD/32WD/32XD	(China) Zhang Nan (China) Lu Lu	(China) Chen Zhiben (China) Zhang Jinkang
June 29	Philippines Open: Host: Manila, Philippines; Level: Grand Prix Gold; Format: 64MS/32WS/32MD/32WD/32XD	Score: 22–20, 21–19	

=== July ===
Week of	Tournament	Champions	Runners-up
July 1	White Nights: Host: Gatchina, Russia; Level: International Challenge; Format: 64MS/32WS/32MD/16WD/32XD	(Ukraine) Dmytro Zavadsky	(Russia) Stanislav Pukhov
July 1	White Nights: Host: Gatchina, Russia; Level: International Challenge; Format: 64MS/32WS/32MD/16WD/32XD	Score: 21–0, 21–0 disqualified	
July 1	White Nights: Host: Gatchina, Russia; Level: International Challenge; Format: 64MS/32WS/32MD/16WD/32XD	(Russia) Ella Diehl	(Ukraine) Elena Prus
July 1	White Nights: Host: Gatchina, Russia; Level: International Challenge; Format: 64MS/32WS/32MD/16WD/32XD	Score: 21–10, 21–10	
July 1	White Nights: Host: Gatchina, Russia; Level: International Challenge; Format: 64MS/32WS/32MD/16WD/32XD	(Russia) Vitalij Durkin (Russia) Aleksandr Nikolaenko	(Russia) Vladimir Ivanov (Russia) Ivan Sozonov
July 1	White Nights: Host: Gatchina, Russia; Level: International Challenge; Format: 64MS/32WS/32MD/16WD/32XD	Score: 21–17, 21–11	
July 1	White Nights: Host: Gatchina, Russia; Level: International Challenge; Format: 64MS/32WS/32MD/16WD/32XD	(Russia) Valeria Sorokina (Russia) Nina Vislova	(Russia) Anastasia Prokopenko (Russia) Anastasia Russkikh
July 1	White Nights: Host: Gatchina, Russia; Level: International Challenge; Format: 64MS/32WS/32MD/16WD/32XD	Score: 21–19, 13–21, 21–17	
July 1	White Nights: Host: Gatchina, Russia; Level: International Challenge; Format: 64MS/32WS/32MD/16WD/32XD	(Indonesia) Flandi Limpele (Russia) Anastasia Russkikh	(Russia) Vitalij Durkin (Russia) Nina Vislova
July 1	White Nights: Host: Gatchina, Russia; Level: International Challenge; Format: 64MS/32WS/32MD/16WD/32XD	Score: 21–14, 25–23	
July 6	U.S. Open: Host: Orange, California, United States; Level: Grand Prix; Format: 64MS/32WS/32MD/32WD/32XD	(Indonesia) Taufik Hidayat	(Chinese Taipei) Hsueh Hsuan-yi
July 6	U.S. Open: Host: Orange, California, United States; Level: Grand Prix; Format: 64MS/32WS/32MD/32WD/32XD	Score: 21–15, 21–16	
July 6	U.S. Open: Host: Orange, California, United States; Level: Grand Prix; Format: 64MS/32WS/32MD/32WD/32XD	(Canada) Anna Rice	(United States) Mona Santoso
July 6	U.S. Open: Host: Orange, California, United States; Level: Grand Prix; Format: 64MS/32WS/32MD/32WD/32XD	Score: 21–17, 21–9	
July 6	U.S. Open: Host: Orange, California, United States; Level: Grand Prix; Format: 64MS/32WS/32MD/32WD/32XD	(United States) Howard Bach (United States) Tony Gunawan	(Austria) Jürgen Koch (Austria) Peter Zauner
July 6	U.S. Open: Host: Orange, California, United States; Level: Grand Prix; Format: 64MS/32WS/32MD/32WD/32XD	Score: 21–12, 21–9	
July 6	U.S. Open: Host: Orange, California, United States; Level: Grand Prix; Format: 64MS/32WS/32MD/32WD/32XD	(Canada) Huang Ruilin (Canada) Jiang Xuelian	(United States) Chen Ying (United States) Peng Yun
July 6	U.S. Open: Host: Orange, California, United States; Level: Grand Prix; Format: 64MS/32WS/32MD/32WD/32XD	Score: 14–21, 21–15, 21–11	
July 6	U.S. Open: Host: Orange, California, United States; Level: Grand Prix; Format: 64MS/32WS/32MD/32WD/32XD	(United States) Howard Bach (United States) Eva Lee	(Canada) Alvin Lau (Canada) Jiang Xuelian
July 6	U.S. Open: Host: Orange, California, United States; Level: Grand Prix; Format: 64MS/32WS/32MD/32WD/32XD	Score: 21–13, 21–12	
July 13	Nouméa International: Host: Nouméa, New Caledonia; Level: Future Series; Format: 32MS/8WS/8MD/16WD/16XD	(New Zealand) Joe Wu	(India) Aditya Elango
July 13	Nouméa International: Host: Nouméa, New Caledonia; Level: Future Series; Format: 32MS/8WS/8MD/16WD/16XD	Score: 21–17, 21–13	
July 13	Nouméa International: Host: Nouméa, New Caledonia; Level: Future Series; Format: 32MS/8WS/8MD/16WD/16XD	(Mexico) Deyanira Angulo	(New Zealand) Danielle Barry
July 13	Nouméa International: Host: Nouméa, New Caledonia; Level: Future Series; Format: 32MS/8WS/8MD/16WD/16XD	Score: 21–17, 16–21, 21–19	
July 13	Nouméa International: Host: Nouméa, New Caledonia; Level: Future Series; Format: 32MS/8WS/8MD/16WD/16XD	(New Zealand) Oliver Leydon-Davis (New Zealand) Henry Tam	(New Zealand) Kevin Dennerly-Minturn (New Zealand) Joe Wu
July 13	Nouméa International: Host: Nouméa, New Caledonia; Level: Future Series; Format: 32MS/8WS/8MD/16WD/16XD	Score: 21–17, 22–24, 21–16	
July 13	Nouméa International: Host: Nouméa, New Caledonia; Level: Future Series; Format: 32MS/8WS/8MD/16WD/16XD	(New Zealand) Danielle Barry (New Zealand) Donna Haliday	(Mexico) Deyanira Angulo (Australia) Louise McKenzie
July 13	Nouméa International: Host: Nouméa, New Caledonia; Level: Future Series; Format: 32MS/8WS/8MD/16WD/16XD	Score: 21–5, 21–11	
July 13	Nouméa International: Host: Nouméa, New Caledonia; Level: Future Series; Format: 32MS/8WS/8MD/16WD/16XD	(New Zealand) Henry Tam (New Zealand) Donna Haliday	(New Zealand) Kevin Dennerly-Minturn (Australia) Louise McKenzie
July 13	Nouméa International: Host: Nouméa, New Caledonia; Level: Future Series; Format: 32MS/8WS/8MD/16WD/16XD	Score: 21–19, 21–15	
July 20	Thailand Open: Host: Bangkok, Thailand; Level: Grand Prix Gold; Format: 64MS/32WS/32MD/32WD/32XD	(Vietnam) Nguyễn Tiến Minh	(Thailand) Boonsak Ponsana
July 20	Thailand Open: Host: Bangkok, Thailand; Level: Grand Prix Gold; Format: 64MS/32WS/32MD/32WD/32XD	Score: 21–16, 21–13	
July 20	Thailand Open: Host: Bangkok, Thailand; Level: Grand Prix Gold; Format: 64MS/32WS/32MD/32WD/32XD	(China) Liu Jian	(China) Wang Rong
July 20	Thailand Open: Host: Bangkok, Thailand; Level: Grand Prix Gold; Format: 64MS/32WS/32MD/32WD/32XD	Score: 21–16, 21–18	
July 20	Thailand Open: Host: Bangkok, Thailand; Level: Grand Prix Gold; Format: 64MS/32WS/32MD/32WD/32XD	(Malaysia) Chan Peng Soon (Malaysia) Lim Khim Wah	(Malaysia) Choong Tan Fook (Malaysia) Lee Wan Wah
July 20	Thailand Open: Host: Bangkok, Thailand; Level: Grand Prix Gold; Format: 64MS/32WS/32MD/32WD/32XD	Score: 20–22, 21–14, 21–11	
July 20	Thailand Open: Host: Bangkok, Thailand; Level: Grand Prix Gold; Format: 64MS/32WS/32MD/32WD/32XD	(China) Yang Wei (China) Zhang Jiewen	(China) Gao Ling (China) Wei Yili
July 20	Thailand Open: Host: Bangkok, Thailand; Level: Grand Prix Gold; Format: 64MS/32WS/32MD/32WD/32XD	Score: 22–24, 21–17, 21–15	
July 20	Thailand Open: Host: Bangkok, Thailand; Level: Grand Prix Gold; Format: 64MS/32WS/32MD/32WD/32XD	(Thailand) Songphon Anugritayawon (Thailand) Kunchala Voravichitchaikul	(Thailand) Sudket Prapakamol (Thailand) Saralee Thungthongkam
July 20	Thailand Open: Host: Bangkok, Thailand; Level: Grand Prix Gold; Format: 64MS/32WS/32MD/32WD/32XD	Score:11–21, 21–17, 21–14	
July 20	Australian Open: Host: Victoria, Melbourne, Australia; Level: Grand Prix; Format: 64MS/32WS/32MD/32WD/32XD	(Indonesia) Dionysius Hayom Rumbaka	(Indonesia) Alamsyah Yunus
July 20	Australian Open: Host: Victoria, Melbourne, Australia; Level: Grand Prix; Format: 64MS/32WS/32MD/32WD/32XD	Score: 21–17, 21–18	
July 20	Australian Open: Host: Victoria, Melbourne, Australia; Level: Grand Prix; Format: 64MS/32WS/32MD/32WD/32XD	(Indonesia) Maria Febe Kusumastuti	(Hong Kong) Yip Pui Yin
July 20	Australian Open: Host: Victoria, Melbourne, Australia; Level: Grand Prix; Format: 64MS/32WS/32MD/32WD/32XD	Score: 21–18, 21–19	
July 20	Australian Open: Host: Victoria, Melbourne, Australia; Level: Grand Prix; Format: 64MS/32WS/32MD/32WD/32XD	(Malaysia) Gan Teik Chai (Malaysia) Tan Bin Shen	(India) Rupesh Kumar (India) Sanave Thomas
July 20	Australian Open: Host: Victoria, Melbourne, Australia; Level: Grand Prix; Format: 64MS/32WS/32MD/32WD/32XD	Score: 21–13, 21–11	
July 20	Australian Open: Host: Victoria, Melbourne, Australia; Level: Grand Prix; Format: 64MS/32WS/32MD/32WD/32XD	(Australia) Huang Chia-chi (Australia) Tang He Tian	(India) Aparna Balan (India) Shruti Kurian
July 20	Australian Open: Host: Victoria, Melbourne, Australia; Level: Grand Prix; Format: 64MS/32WS/32MD/32WD/32XD	Score: 21–13, 21–9	
July 20	Australian Open: Host: Victoria, Melbourne, Australia; Level: Grand Prix; Format: 64MS/32WS/32MD/32WD/32XD	(Hong Kong) Yohan Hadikusumo Wiratama (Hong Kong) Chau Hoi Wah	(New Zealand) Henry Tam (New Zealand) Donna Haliday
July 20	Australian Open: Host: Victoria, Melbourne, Australia; Level: Grand Prix; Format: 64MS/32WS/32MD/32WD/32XD	Score:21–11, 21–5	
July 27	New Zealand Open: Host: North Shore, New Zealand; Level: Grand Prix; Format: 64MS/32WS/32MD/32WD/32XD	(Hong Kong) Chan Yan Kit	(Hong Kong) Wong Wing Ki
July 27	New Zealand Open: Host: North Shore, New Zealand; Level: Grand Prix; Format: 64MS/32WS/32MD/32WD/32XD	Score: 21–9, 21–9	
July 27	New Zealand Open: Host: North Shore, New Zealand; Level: Grand Prix; Format: 64MS/32WS/32MD/32WD/32XD	(Japan) Sayaka Sato	(Indonesia) Maria Febe Kusumastuti
July 27	New Zealand Open: Host: North Shore, New Zealand; Level: Grand Prix; Format: 64MS/32WS/32MD/32WD/32XD	Score: 21–10, 21–16	
July 27	New Zealand Open: Host: North Shore, New Zealand; Level: Grand Prix; Format: 64MS/32WS/32MD/32WD/32XD	(India) Rupesh Kumar (India) Sanave Thomas	(Japan) Hirokatsu Hashimoto (Japan) Noriyasu Hirata
July 27	New Zealand Open: Host: North Shore, New Zealand; Level: Grand Prix; Format: 64MS/32WS/32MD/32WD/32XD	Score: 21–16, 15–21, 21–13	
July 27	New Zealand Open: Host: North Shore, New Zealand; Level: Grand Prix; Format: 64MS/32WS/32MD/32WD/32XD	(Indonesia) Anneke Feinya Agustin (Indonesia) Anisa Wahyuni	(Hong Kong) Chan Tsz Ka (Hong Kong) Tse Ying Suet
July 27	New Zealand Open: Host: North Shore, New Zealand; Level: Grand Prix; Format: 64MS/32WS/32MD/32WD/32XD	Score: 21–19, 21–17	
July 27	New Zealand Open: Host: North Shore, New Zealand; Level: Grand Prix; Format: 64MS/32WS/32MD/32WD/32XD	(Indonesia) Fran Kurniawan (Indonesia) Pia Zebadiah Bernadet	(Hong Kong) Yohan Hadikusumo Wiratama (Hong Kong) Chau Hoi Wah
July 27	New Zealand Open: Host: North Shore, New Zealand; Level: Grand Prix; Format: 64MS/32WS/32MD/32WD/32XD	Score:21–13, 21–19	
July 27	Lao International: Host: Vientiane, Laos; Level: International Challenge; Format: 32MS/32WS/32MD/16WD/32XD	(Malaysia) Beryno Wong Jiann Tze	(Vietnam) Nguyễn Hoàng Nam
July 27	Lao International: Host: Vientiane, Laos; Level: International Challenge; Format: 32MS/32WS/32MD/16WD/32XD	Score: 21–17, 21–16	
July 27	Lao International: Host: Vientiane, Laos; Level: International Challenge; Format: 32MS/32WS/32MD/16WD/32XD	(Japan) Chie Umezu	(Japan) Nozomi Kametani
July 27	Lao International: Host: Vientiane, Laos; Level: International Challenge; Format: 32MS/32WS/32MD/16WD/32XD	Score: 19–21, 21–15, 21–12	
July 27	Lao International: Host: Vientiane, Laos; Level: International Challenge; Format: 32MS/32WS/32MD/16WD/32XD	(Indonesia) Berry Anggriawan (Indonesia) Muhammad Ulinnuha	(Laos) Chanda Vanvilay (Laos) Nyothin Latsavong
July 27	Lao International: Host: Vientiane, Laos; Level: International Challenge; Format: 32MS/32WS/32MD/16WD/32XD	Score: 21–12, 21–11	
July 27	Lao International: Host: Vientiane, Laos; Level: International Challenge; Format: 32MS/32WS/32MD/16WD/32XD	(Japan) Aki Akao (Japan) Yasuyo Imabeppu	(Japan) Seiko Yamada (Japan) Yuka Hayashi
July 27	Lao International: Host: Vientiane, Laos; Level: International Challenge; Format: 32MS/32WS/32MD/16WD/32XD	Score: 15–21, 21–11, 21–14	
July 27	Lao International: Host: Vientiane, Laos; Level: International Challenge; Format: 32MS/32WS/32MD/16WD/32XD	(Vietnam) Dương Bảo Đức (Vietnam) Thái Thị Hồng Gấm	(Indonesia) Muhammad Ulinnuha (Indonesia) Jenna Gozali
July 27	Lao International: Host: Vientiane, Laos; Level: International Challenge; Format: 32MS/32WS/32MD/16WD/32XD	Score: 21–17, 21–23, 21–18	

=== August ===
Week of	Tournament	Champions	Runners-up
August 3	Indonesia International: Host: Jakarta, Indonesia; Level: International Challenge; Format: 128MS/64WS/64MD/32WD/64XD	(Indonesia) Dionysius Hayom Rumbaka	(Indonesia) Fauzi Adnan
August 3	Indonesia International: Host: Jakarta, Indonesia; Level: International Challenge; Format: 128MS/64WS/64MD/32WD/64XD	Score: 21–14, 11–6 Retired	
August 3	Indonesia International: Host: Jakarta, Indonesia; Level: International Challenge; Format: 128MS/64WS/64MD/32WD/64XD	(Indonesia) Fransisca Ratnasari	(Indonesia) Maria Elfira Christina
August 3	Indonesia International: Host: Jakarta, Indonesia; Level: International Challenge; Format: 128MS/64WS/64MD/32WD/64XD	Score: 21–12, 21–19	
August 3	Indonesia International: Host: Jakarta, Indonesia; Level: International Challenge; Format: 128MS/64WS/64MD/32WD/64XD	(Indonesia) Hendra Aprida Gunawan (Indonesia) Alvent Yulianto	(Indonesia) Angga Pratama (Indonesia) Rian Agung Saputra
August 3	Indonesia International: Host: Jakarta, Indonesia; Level: International Challenge; Format: 128MS/64WS/64MD/32WD/64XD	Score: 21–17, 21–12	
August 3	Indonesia International: Host: Jakarta, Indonesia; Level: International Challenge; Format: 128MS/64WS/64MD/32WD/64XD	(Indonesia) Nadya Melati (Indonesia) Vita Marissa	(Indonesia) Della Destiara Haris (Indonesia) Ni Made Claudia Ayu Wijaya
August 3	Indonesia International: Host: Jakarta, Indonesia; Level: International Challenge; Format: 128MS/64WS/64MD/32WD/64XD	Score: 22–20, 21–16	
August 3	Indonesia International: Host: Jakarta, Indonesia; Level: International Challenge; Format: 128MS/64WS/64MD/32WD/64XD	(Indonesia) Riky Widianto (Indonesia) Devi Tika Permatasari	(Indonesia) Irfan Fadhilah (Indonesia) Weni Anggraini
August 3	Indonesia International: Host: Jakarta, Indonesia; Level: International Challenge; Format: 128MS/64WS/64MD/32WD/64XD	Score: 21–12, 21–18	
August 10	World Championships (Draw): Host: Hyderabad, India; Level: BWF Major Event; Format: 64MS/64WS/64MD/64WD/64XD	(China) Lin Dan	(China) Chen Jin
August 10	World Championships (Draw): Host: Hyderabad, India; Level: BWF Major Event; Format: 64MS/64WS/64MD/64WD/64XD	Score: 21–18, 21–16	
August 10	World Championships (Draw): Host: Hyderabad, India; Level: BWF Major Event; Format: 64MS/64WS/64MD/64WD/64XD	(China) Lu Lan	(China) Xie Xingfang
August 10	World Championships (Draw): Host: Hyderabad, India; Level: BWF Major Event; Format: 64MS/64WS/64MD/64WD/64XD	Score: 23–21, 21–12	
August 10	World Championships (Draw): Host: Hyderabad, India; Level: BWF Major Event; Format: 64MS/64WS/64MD/64WD/64XD	(China) Cai Yun (China) Fu Haifeng	(South Korea) Jung Jae-sung (South Korea) Lee Yong-dae
August 10	World Championships (Draw): Host: Hyderabad, India; Level: BWF Major Event; Format: 64MS/64WS/64MD/64WD/64XD	Score: 21–18, 16–21, 28–26	
August 10	World Championships (Draw): Host: Hyderabad, India; Level: BWF Major Event; Format: 64MS/64WS/64MD/64WD/64XD	(China) Zhang Yawen (China) Zhao Tingting	(China) Cheng Shu (China) Zhao Yunlei
August 10	World Championships (Draw): Host: Hyderabad, India; Level: BWF Major Event; Format: 64MS/64WS/64MD/64WD/64XD	Score: 17–21, 21–17, 21–16	
August 10	World Championships (Draw): Host: Hyderabad, India; Level: BWF Major Event; Format: 64MS/64WS/64MD/64WD/64XD	(Denmark) Thomas Laybourn (Denmark) Kamilla Rytter Juhl	(Indonesia) Nova Widianto (Indonesia) Liliyana Natsir
August 10	World Championships (Draw): Host: Hyderabad, India; Level: BWF Major Event; Format: 64MS/64WS/64MD/64WD/64XD	Score: 21–13, 21–17	
August 17	Macau Open: Host: Macau; Level: Grand Prix Gold; Format: 64MS/32WS/32MD/32WD/32XD	(Malaysia) Lee Chong Wei	(Malaysia) Wong Choong Hann
August 17	Macau Open: Host: Macau; Level: Grand Prix Gold; Format: 64MS/32WS/32MD/32WD/32XD	Score: 21–15, 21–19	
August 17	Macau Open: Host: Macau; Level: Grand Prix Gold; Format: 64MS/32WS/32MD/32WD/32XD	(China) Wang Yihan	(China) Jiang Yanjiao
August 17	Macau Open: Host: Macau; Level: Grand Prix Gold; Format: 64MS/32WS/32MD/32WD/32XD	Score: 16–21, 22–20, 21–12	
August 17	Macau Open: Host: Macau; Level: Grand Prix Gold; Format: 64MS/32WS/32MD/32WD/32XD	(Malaysia) Koo Kien Keat (Malaysia) Tan Boon Heong	(Malaysia) Choong Tan Fook (Malaysia) Lee Wan Wah
August 17	Macau Open: Host: Macau; Level: Grand Prix Gold; Format: 64MS/32WS/32MD/32WD/32XD	Score: 21–14, 17–21, 21–12	
August 17	Macau Open: Host: Macau; Level: Grand Prix Gold; Format: 64MS/32WS/32MD/32WD/32XD	(China) Du Jing (China) Yu Yang	(China) Yang Wei (China) Zhang Jiewen
August 17	Macau Open: Host: Macau; Level: Grand Prix Gold; Format: 64MS/32WS/32MD/32WD/32XD	Score: 21–16, 21–11	
August 17	Macau Open: Host: Macau; Level: Grand Prix Gold; Format: 64MS/32WS/32MD/32WD/32XD	(China) He Hanbin (China) Yu Yang	(Indonesia) Hendra Aprida Gunawan (Indonesia) Vita Marissa
August 17	Macau Open: Host: Macau; Level: Grand Prix Gold; Format: 64MS/32WS/32MD/32WD/32XD	Score: 21–14, 21–9	
August 24	Chinese Taipei Open: Host: Taipei, Chinese Taipei; Level: Grand Prix Gold; Format: 64MS/32WS/32MD/32WD/32XD	(Vietnam) Nguyễn Tiến Minh	(Malaysia) Wong Choong Hann
August 24	Chinese Taipei Open: Host: Taipei, Chinese Taipei; Level: Grand Prix Gold; Format: 64MS/32WS/32MD/32WD/32XD	Score: 21–11, 21–14	
August 24	Chinese Taipei Open: Host: Taipei, Chinese Taipei; Level: Grand Prix Gold; Format: 64MS/32WS/32MD/32WD/32XD	(Chinese Taipei) Cheng Shao-chieh	(South Korea) Bae Seung-hee
August 24	Chinese Taipei Open: Host: Taipei, Chinese Taipei; Level: Grand Prix Gold; Format: 64MS/32WS/32MD/32WD/32XD	Score: 17–21, 21–12, 21–15	
August 24	Chinese Taipei Open: Host: Taipei, Chinese Taipei; Level: Grand Prix Gold; Format: 64MS/32WS/32MD/32WD/32XD	(Chinese Taipei) Chen Hung-ling (Chinese Taipei) Lin Yu-lang	(Hong Kong) Yohan Hadikusumo Wiratama (Hong Kong) Wong Wai Hong
August 24	Chinese Taipei Open: Host: Taipei, Chinese Taipei; Level: Grand Prix Gold; Format: 64MS/32WS/32MD/32WD/32XD	Score: 14–21, 21–12, 21–19	
August 24	Chinese Taipei Open: Host: Taipei, Chinese Taipei; Level: Grand Prix Gold; Format: 64MS/32WS/32MD/32WD/32XD	(China) Yang Wei (China) Zhang Jiewen	(Indonesia) Vita Marissa (United States) Mona Santoso
August 24	Chinese Taipei Open: Host: Taipei, Chinese Taipei; Level: Grand Prix Gold; Format: 64MS/32WS/32MD/32WD/32XD	Score: 21–14, 21–9	
August 24	Chinese Taipei Open: Host: Taipei, Chinese Taipei; Level: Grand Prix Gold; Format: 64MS/32WS/32MD/32WD/32XD	(India) Valiyaveetil Diju (India) Jwala Gutta	(Indonesia) Hendra Aprida Gunawan (Indonesia) Vita Marissa
August 24	Chinese Taipei Open: Host: Taipei, Chinese Taipei; Level: Grand Prix Gold; Format: 64MS/32WS/32MD/32WD/32XD	Score: 23–21, 21–18	

=== September ===
Week of	Tournament	Champions	Runners-up
September 1	Belgian International: Host: Mechelen, Belgium; Level: International Challenge; Format: 32MS/32WS/32MD/32WD/32XD	(Germany) Marc Zwiebler	(Denmark) Christian Lind Thomsen
September 1	Belgian International: Host: Mechelen, Belgium; Level: International Challenge; Format: 32MS/32WS/32MD/32WD/32XD	Score: 21–13, 16–21, 21–15	
September 1	Belgian International: Host: Mechelen, Belgium; Level: International Challenge; Format: 32MS/32WS/32MD/32WD/32XD	(Netherlands) Yao Jie	(Japan) Misaki Matsutomo
September 1	Belgian International: Host: Mechelen, Belgium; Level: International Challenge; Format: 32MS/32WS/32MD/32WD/32XD	Score: 21–14, 14–21, 21–16	
September 1	Belgian International: Host: Mechelen, Belgium; Level: International Challenge; Format: 32MS/32WS/32MD/32WD/32XD	(Netherlands) Ruud Bosch (Netherlands) Koen Ridder	(England) Marcus Ellis (England) Peter Mills
September 1	Belgian International: Host: Mechelen, Belgium; Level: International Challenge; Format: 32MS/32WS/32MD/32WD/32XD	Score: 30–28, 21–12	
September 1	Belgian International: Host: Mechelen, Belgium; Level: International Challenge; Format: 32MS/32WS/32MD/32WD/32XD	(Japan) Misaki Matsutomo (Japan) Ayaka Takahashi	(Scotland) Emma Mason (England) Samantha Ward
September 1	Belgian International: Host: Mechelen, Belgium; Level: International Challenge; Format: 32MS/32WS/32MD/32WD/32XD	Score: 21–8, 18–21, 21–13	
September 1	Belgian International: Host: Mechelen, Belgium; Level: International Challenge; Format: 32MS/32WS/32MD/32WD/32XD	(England) Marcus Ellis (England) Heather Olver	(Belgium) Wouter Claes (Belgium) Nathalie Descamps
September 1	Belgian International: Host: Mechelen, Belgium; Level: International Challenge; Format: 32MS/32WS/32MD/32WD/32XD	Score: 21–9, 25–23	
September 7	Kharkiv International: Host: Kharkiv, Ukraine; Level: International Series; Format: 32MS/32WS/32MD/16WD/32XD	(Ukraine) Dmytro Zavadsky	(Denmark) Kristian Midtgaard
September 7	Kharkiv International: Host: Kharkiv, Ukraine; Level: International Series; Format: 32MS/32WS/32MD/16WD/32XD	Score: 17–21, 21–8, 21–13	
September 7	Kharkiv International: Host: Kharkiv, Ukraine; Level: International Series; Format: 32MS/32WS/32MD/16WD/32XD	(Denmark) Anne Hald Jensen	(Russia) Tatjana Bibik
September 7	Kharkiv International: Host: Kharkiv, Ukraine; Level: International Series; Format: 32MS/32WS/32MD/16WD/32XD	Score: 21–17, 21–13	
September 7	Kharkiv International: Host: Kharkiv, Ukraine; Level: International Series; Format: 32MS/32WS/32MD/16WD/32XD	(Russia) Andrey Ashmarin (Russia) Andrei Ivanov	(Ukraine) Valeriy Atrashchenkov (Ukraine) Vladislav Druzchenko
September 7	Kharkiv International: Host: Kharkiv, Ukraine; Level: International Series; Format: 32MS/32WS/32MD/16WD/32XD	Score: 21–16, 23–21	
September 7	Kharkiv International: Host: Kharkiv, Ukraine; Level: International Series; Format: 32MS/32WS/32MD/16WD/32XD	(Ukraine) Anna Kobceva (Ukraine) Elena Prus	(Russia) Tatjana Bibik (Russia) Olga Golovanova
September 7	Kharkiv International: Host: Kharkiv, Ukraine; Level: International Series; Format: 32MS/32WS/32MD/16WD/32XD	Score: 8–21, 21–18, 21–18	
September 7	Kharkiv International: Host: Kharkiv, Ukraine; Level: International Series; Format: 32MS/32WS/32MD/16WD/32XD	(Ukraine) Valeriy Atrashchenkov (Ukraine) Elena Prus	(Russia) Andrey Ashmarin (Russia) Anastasia Prokopenko
September 7	Kharkiv International: Host: Kharkiv, Ukraine; Level: International Series; Format: 32MS/32WS/32MD/16WD/32XD	Score: Walkover	
September 14	China Masters (Draw): Host: Changzhou, China; Level: Superseries; Format: 32MS/32WS/32MD/32WD/32XD	(China) Lin Dan	(Thailand) Boonsak Ponsana
September 14	China Masters (Draw): Host: Changzhou, China; Level: Superseries; Format: 32MS/32WS/32MD/32WD/32XD	Score: 21–17, 21–17	
September 14	China Masters (Draw): Host: Changzhou, China; Level: Superseries; Format: 32MS/32WS/32MD/32WD/32XD	(China) Wang Shixian	(China) Wang Lin
September 14	China Masters (Draw): Host: Changzhou, China; Level: Superseries; Format: 32MS/32WS/32MD/32WD/32XD	Score: 21–14, 14–21, 21–14	
September 14	China Masters (Draw): Host: Changzhou, China; Level: Superseries; Format: 32MS/32WS/32MD/32WD/32XD	(China) Guo Zhendong (China) Xu Chen	(China) Cai Yun (China) Fu Haifeng
September 14	China Masters (Draw): Host: Changzhou, China; Level: Superseries; Format: 32MS/32WS/32MD/32WD/32XD	Score: Walkover	
September 14	China Masters (Draw): Host: Changzhou, China; Level: Superseries; Format: 32MS/32WS/32MD/32WD/32XD	(China) Du Jing (China) Yu Yang	(China) Cheng Shu (China) Zhao Yunlei
September 14	China Masters (Draw): Host: Changzhou, China; Level: Superseries; Format: 32MS/32WS/32MD/32WD/32XD	Score: 21–15, 21–15	
September 14	China Masters (Draw): Host: Changzhou, China; Level: Superseries; Format: 32MS/32WS/32MD/32WD/32XD	(China) Tao Jiaming (China) Wang Xiaoli	(China) Xie Zhongbo (China) Zhang Yawen
September 14	China Masters (Draw): Host: Changzhou, China; Level: Superseries; Format: 32MS/32WS/32MD/32WD/32XD	Score: 13–21, 21–19, 8–4 retired	
September 14	Colombia International: Host: Bogotá, Colombia; Level: Future Series; Format: 32MS/16WS/16MD/16XD	(Brazil) Daniel Paiola	(Peru) Mario Cuba
September 14	Colombia International: Host: Bogotá, Colombia; Level: Future Series; Format: 32MS/16WS/16MD/16XD	Score: 21–19, 21–15	
September 14	Colombia International: Host: Bogotá, Colombia; Level: Future Series; Format: 32MS/16WS/16MD/16XD	(Peru) Katherine Winder	(Peru) Lorena Duany
September 14	Colombia International: Host: Bogotá, Colombia; Level: Future Series; Format: 32MS/16WS/16MD/16XD	Score: 21–10, 21–13	
September 14	Colombia International: Host: Bogotá, Colombia; Level: Future Series; Format: 32MS/16WS/16MD/16XD	(United States) David Neumann (United States) Mathew Fogarty	(Ecuador) Santiago Zambrano (Ecuador) Sebastian Teran
September 14	Colombia International: Host: Bogotá, Colombia; Level: Future Series; Format: 32MS/16WS/16MD/16XD	Score: 21–9, 17–21, 21–14	
September 14	Colombia International: Host: Bogotá, Colombia; Level: Future Series; Format: 32MS/16WS/16MD/16XD	(Peru) Mario Cuba (Peru) Katherine Winder	(Peru) Gonzalo Duany (Peru) Lorena Duany
September 14	Colombia International: Host: Bogotá, Colombia; Level: Future Series; Format: 32MS/16WS/16MD/16XD	Score: 21–18, 21–9	
September 21	Japan Open (Draw): Host: Tokyo, Japan; Level: Superseries; Format: 32MS/32WS/32MD/32WD/32XD	(China) Bao Chunlai	(Indonesia) Taufik Hidayat
September 21	Japan Open (Draw): Host: Tokyo, Japan; Level: Superseries; Format: 32MS/32WS/32MD/32WD/32XD	Score: 21–15, 21–12	
September 21	Japan Open (Draw): Host: Tokyo, Japan; Level: Superseries; Format: 32MS/32WS/32MD/32WD/32XD	(China) Wang Yihan	(China) Wang Xin
September 21	Japan Open (Draw): Host: Tokyo, Japan; Level: Superseries; Format: 32MS/32WS/32MD/32WD/32XD	Score: 21–8, 21–9	
September 21	Japan Open (Draw): Host: Tokyo, Japan; Level: Superseries; Format: 32MS/32WS/32MD/32WD/32XD	(Indonesia) Markis Kido (Indonesia) Hendra Setiawan	(Indonesia) Yonathan Suryatama Dasuki (Indonesia) Rian Sukmawan
September 21	Japan Open (Draw): Host: Tokyo, Japan; Level: Superseries; Format: 32MS/32WS/32MD/32WD/32XD	Score: 21–19, 24–22	
September 21	Japan Open (Draw): Host: Tokyo, Japan; Level: Superseries; Format: 32MS/32WS/32MD/32WD/32XD	(China) Ma Jin (China) Wang Xiaoli	(Japan) Miyuki Maeda (Japan) Satoko Suetsuna
September 21	Japan Open (Draw): Host: Tokyo, Japan; Level: Superseries; Format: 32MS/32WS/32MD/32WD/32XD	Score: 21–19, 21–18	
September 21	Japan Open (Draw): Host: Tokyo, Japan; Level: Superseries; Format: 32MS/32WS/32MD/32WD/32XD	(Thailand) Songphon Anugritayawon (Thailand) Kunchala Voravichitchaikul	(Denmark) Joachim Fischer Nielsen (Denmark) Christinna Pedersen
September 21	Japan Open (Draw): Host: Tokyo, Japan; Level: Superseries; Format: 32MS/32WS/32MD/32WD/32XD	Score: 13–21, 21–16, 22–20	
September 21	Russian Open: Host: Vladivostok, Russia; Level: Grand Prix; Format: 32MS/32WS/16MD/16WD/32XD	(Russia) Vladimir Malkov	(France) Brice Leverdez
September 21	Russian Open: Host: Vladivostok, Russia; Level: Grand Prix; Format: 32MS/32WS/16MD/16WD/32XD	Score: 21–17, 11–21, 21–8	
September 21	Russian Open: Host: Vladivostok, Russia; Level: Grand Prix; Format: 32MS/32WS/16MD/16WD/32XD	(Russia) Ella Diehl	(Russia) Tatjana Bibik
September 21	Russian Open: Host: Vladivostok, Russia; Level: Grand Prix; Format: 32MS/32WS/16MD/16WD/32XD	Score: 21–17, 16–21, 21–11	
September 21	Russian Open: Host: Vladivostok, Russia; Level: Grand Prix; Format: 32MS/32WS/16MD/16WD/32XD	(Russia) Vladimir Ivanov (Russia) Ivan Sozonov	(Russia) Vitalij Durkin (Russia) Aleksandr Nikolaenko
September 21	Russian Open: Host: Vladivostok, Russia; Level: Grand Prix; Format: 32MS/32WS/16MD/16WD/32XD	Score: 21–19, 21–19	
September 21	Russian Open: Host: Vladivostok, Russia; Level: Grand Prix; Format: 32MS/32WS/16MD/16WD/32XD	(Russia) Valeria Sorokina (Russia) Nina Vislova	(Russia) Tatjana Bibik (Russia) Olga Golovanova
September 21	Russian Open: Host: Vladivostok, Russia; Level: Grand Prix; Format: 32MS/32WS/16MD/16WD/32XD	Score: 21–8, 22–20	
September 21	Russian Open: Host: Vladivostok, Russia; Level: Grand Prix; Format: 32MS/32WS/16MD/16WD/32XD	(Russia) Vitalij Durkin (Russia) Nina Vislova	(Russia) Aleksandr Nikolaenko (Russia) Valeria Sorokina
September 21	Russian Open: Host: Vladivostok, Russia; Level: Grand Prix; Format: 32MS/32WS/16MD/16WD/32XD	Score: 21–16, 21–16	
September 21	Czech International: Host: Brno, Czech Republic; Level: International Series; Format: 32MS/32WS/32MD/32WD/32XD	(Czech Republic) Petr Koukal	(Ukraine) Dmytro Zavadsky
September 21	Czech International: Host: Brno, Czech Republic; Level: International Series; Format: 32MS/32WS/32MD/32WD/32XD	Score: 21–17, 21–19	
September 21	Czech International: Host: Brno, Czech Republic; Level: International Series; Format: 32MS/32WS/32MD/32WD/32XD	(India) Trupti Murgunde	(Switzerland) Jeanine Cicognini
September 21	Czech International: Host: Brno, Czech Republic; Level: International Series; Format: 32MS/32WS/32MD/32WD/32XD	Score: 21–17, 21–12	
September 21	Czech International: Host: Brno, Czech Republic; Level: International Series; Format: 32MS/32WS/32MD/32WD/32XD	(Denmark) Mads Conrad-Petersen (Denmark) Mads Pieler Kolding	(Denmark) Mikkel Elbjorn (Denmark) Christian John Skovgaard
September 21	Czech International: Host: Brno, Czech Republic; Level: International Series; Format: 32MS/32WS/32MD/32WD/32XD	Score: 21–14, 17–21, 21–9	
September 21	Czech International: Host: Brno, Czech Republic; Level: International Series; Format: 32MS/32WS/32MD/32WD/32XD	(Denmark) Maria Helsbøl (Denmark) Anne Skelbæk	(Switzerland) Marion Gruber (Switzerland) Sabrina Jaquet
September 21	Czech International: Host: Brno, Czech Republic; Level: International Series; Format: 32MS/32WS/32MD/32WD/32XD	Score: 21–14, 21–10	
September 21	Czech International: Host: Brno, Czech Republic; Level: International Series; Format: 32MS/32WS/32MD/32WD/32XD	(Indonesia) Indra Viki Okvana (Indonesia) Gustiani Megawati	(Denmark) Mads Conrad-Petersen (Denmark) Anne Skelbæk
September 21	Czech International: Host: Brno, Czech Republic; Level: International Series; Format: 32MS/32WS/32MD/32WD/32XD	Score: 21–11, 21–13	
September 28	Bitburger Open: Host: Saarbrücken, Germany; Level: Grand Prix; Format: 64MS/32WS/32MD/32WD/32XD	(Denmark) Jan Ø. Jørgensen	(Netherlands) Eric Pang
September 28	Bitburger Open: Host: Saarbrücken, Germany; Level: Grand Prix; Format: 64MS/32WS/32MD/32WD/32XD	Score: 12–21, 21–13, 21–15	
September 28	Bitburger Open: Host: Saarbrücken, Germany; Level: Grand Prix; Format: 64MS/32WS/32MD/32WD/32XD	(Germany) Juliane Schenk	(Japan) Yu Hirayama
September 28	Bitburger Open: Host: Saarbrücken, Germany; Level: Grand Prix; Format: 64MS/32WS/32MD/32WD/32XD	Score: 21–18, 21–10	
September 28	Bitburger Open: Host: Saarbrücken, Germany; Level: Grand Prix; Format: 64MS/32WS/32MD/32WD/32XD	(India) Rupesh Kumar (India) Sanave Thomas	(England) Chris Adcock (England) Andrew Ellis
September 28	Bitburger Open: Host: Saarbrücken, Germany; Level: Grand Prix; Format: 64MS/32WS/32MD/32WD/32XD	Score: 17–21, 22–20, 24–22	
September 28	Bitburger Open: Host: Saarbrücken, Germany; Level: Grand Prix; Format: 64MS/32WS/32MD/32WD/32XD	(Denmark) Helle Nielsen (Denmark) Marie Røpke	(Denmark) Line Damkjaer Kruse (Denmark) Mie Schjøtt-Kristensen
September 28	Bitburger Open: Host: Saarbrücken, Germany; Level: Grand Prix; Format: 64MS/32WS/32MD/32WD/32XD	Score: 18–21, 21–19, 21–19	
September 28	Bitburger Open: Host: Saarbrücken, Germany; Level: Grand Prix; Format: 64MS/32WS/32MD/32WD/32XD	(Denmark) Mikkel Delbo Larsen (Denmark) Mie Schjøtt-Kristensen	(Netherlands) Ruud Bosch (Netherlands) Paulien van Dooremalen
September 28	Bitburger Open: Host: Saarbrücken, Germany; Level: Grand Prix; Format: 64MS/32WS/32MD/32WD/32XD	Score: 21–17, 21–16	
September 28	Singapore International: Host: Singapore; Level: International Series; Format: 64MS/32WS/32MD/16WD/32XD	(South Korea) Shon Seung-mo	(Indonesia) Fauzi Adnan
September 28	Singapore International: Host: Singapore; Level: International Series; Format: 64MS/32WS/32MD/16WD/32XD	Score: 21–9, 21–12	
September 28	Singapore International: Host: Singapore; Level: International Series; Format: 64MS/32WS/32MD/16WD/32XD	(South Korea) Bae Yeon-ju	(South Korea) Bae Seung-hee
September 28	Singapore International: Host: Singapore; Level: International Series; Format: 64MS/32WS/32MD/16WD/32XD	Score: 21–15, 21–14	
September 28	Singapore International: Host: Singapore; Level: International Series; Format: 64MS/32WS/32MD/16WD/32XD	(South Korea) Heo Hoon-hoi (South Korea) Lee Jae-jin	(Singapore) Chayut Triyachart (Singapore) Danny Bawa Chrisnanta
September 28	Singapore International: Host: Singapore; Level: International Series; Format: 64MS/32WS/32MD/16WD/32XD	Score: 20–22, 21–18, 21–16	
September 28	Singapore International: Host: Singapore; Level: International Series; Format: 64MS/32WS/32MD/16WD/32XD	(South Korea) Kim Jin-ock (South Korea) Jung Kyung-eun	(Singapore) Yao Lei (Singapore) Shinta Mulia Sari
September 28	Singapore International: Host: Singapore; Level: International Series; Format: 64MS/32WS/32MD/16WD/32XD	Score: 22–20, 18–21, 22–20	
September 28	Singapore International: Host: Singapore; Level: International Series; Format: 64MS/32WS/32MD/16WD/32XD	(South Korea) Lee Jae-jin (South Korea) Kim Jin-ock	(South Korea) Heo Hoon-hoi (South Korea) Jung Kyung-eun
September 28	Singapore International: Host: Singapore; Level: International Series; Format: 64MS/32WS/32MD/16WD/32XD	Score: 21–19, 21–11	

=== October ===
Week of	Tournament	Champions	Runners-up
October 1	Bulgarian International: Host: Sofia, Bulgaria; Level: International Challenge; Format: 32MS/32WS/32MD/32WD/32XD	(Denmark) Rune Ulsing	(Scotland) Kieran Merrilees
October 1	Bulgarian International: Host: Sofia, Bulgaria; Level: International Challenge; Format: 32MS/32WS/32MD/32WD/32XD	Score: 21–10, 20–22, 21–5	
October 1	Bulgarian International: Host: Sofia, Bulgaria; Level: International Challenge; Format: 32MS/32WS/32MD/32WD/32XD	(Bulgaria) Petya Nedelcheva	(Bulgaria) Linda Zetchiri
October 1	Bulgarian International: Host: Sofia, Bulgaria; Level: International Challenge; Format: 32MS/32WS/32MD/32WD/32XD	Score: 21–4, 19–8 Retired	
October 1	Bulgarian International: Host: Sofia, Bulgaria; Level: International Challenge; Format: 32MS/32WS/32MD/32WD/32XD	(Denmark) Kasper Faust Henriksen (Denmark) Anders Kristiansen	(Russia) Vladimir Ivanov (Russia) Ivan Sozonov
October 1	Bulgarian International: Host: Sofia, Bulgaria; Level: International Challenge; Format: 32MS/32WS/32MD/32WD/32XD	Score: 21–11, 21–11	
October 1	Bulgarian International: Host: Sofia, Bulgaria; Level: International Challenge; Format: 32MS/32WS/32MD/32WD/32XD	(Bulgaria) Petya Nedelcheva (Russia) Anastasia Russkikh	(Germany) Nicole Grether (Canada) Charmaine Reid
October 1	Bulgarian International: Host: Sofia, Bulgaria; Level: International Challenge; Format: 32MS/32WS/32MD/32WD/32XD	Score: 21–11, 21–18	
October 1	Bulgarian International: Host: Sofia, Bulgaria; Level: International Challenge; Format: 32MS/32WS/32MD/32WD/32XD	(Poland) Robert Mateusiak (Poland) Nadieżda Kostiuczyk	(Poland) Adam Cwalina (Poland) Małgorzata Kurdelska
October 1	Bulgarian International: Host: Sofia, Bulgaria; Level: International Challenge; Format: 32MS/32WS/32MD/32WD/32XD	Score: 21–18, 21–9	
October 5	Vietnam Open: Host: Ho Chi Minh City, Vietnam; Level: Grand Prix; Format: 64MS/32WS/32MD/32WD/32XD	(Vietnam) Nguyễn Tiến Minh	(Malaysia) Chong Wei Feng
October 5	Vietnam Open: Host: Ho Chi Minh City, Vietnam; Level: Grand Prix; Format: 64MS/32WS/32MD/32WD/32XD	Score: 21–7, 19–21, 21–14	
October 5	Vietnam Open: Host: Ho Chi Minh City, Vietnam; Level: Grand Prix; Format: 64MS/32WS/32MD/32WD/32XD	(Indonesia) Fransisca Ratnasari	(Chinese Taipei) Tai Tzu-ying
October 5	Vietnam Open: Host: Ho Chi Minh City, Vietnam; Level: Grand Prix; Format: 64MS/32WS/32MD/32WD/32XD	Score: 21–19, 15–21, 21–13	
October 5	Vietnam Open: Host: Ho Chi Minh City, Vietnam; Level: Grand Prix; Format: 64MS/32WS/32MD/32WD/32XD	(Indonesia) Luluk Hadiyanto (Indonesia) Joko Riyadi	(Malaysia) Hoon Thien How (Malaysia) Ong Soon Hock
October 5	Vietnam Open: Host: Ho Chi Minh City, Vietnam; Level: Grand Prix; Format: 64MS/32WS/32MD/32WD/32XD	Score: 21–19, 22–20	
October 5	Vietnam Open: Host: Ho Chi Minh City, Vietnam; Level: Grand Prix; Format: 64MS/32WS/32MD/32WD/32XD	(Indonesia) Anneke Feinya Agustin (Indonesia) Annisa Wahyuni	(Thailand) Savitree Amitrapai (Thailand) Vacharaporn Munkit
October 5	Vietnam Open: Host: Ho Chi Minh City, Vietnam; Level: Grand Prix; Format: 64MS/32WS/32MD/32WD/32XD	Score: 21–14, 21–13	
October 5	Vietnam Open: Host: Ho Chi Minh City, Vietnam; Level: Grand Prix; Format: 64MS/32WS/32MD/32WD/32XD	(Indonesia) Flandy Limpele (Chinese Taipei) Cheng Wen-hsing	(Malaysia) Chan Peng Soon (Malaysia) Goh Liu Ying
October 5	Vietnam Open: Host: Ho Chi Minh City, Vietnam; Level: Grand Prix; Format: 64MS/32WS/32MD/32WD/32XD	Score: 25–23, 21–19	
October 5	Mongolia International: Host: Ulaanbaatar, Mongolia; Level: International Series; Format: 16MS/8WS/8MD/4WD/8XD	(Slovakia) Michal Matejka	(Mongolia) Sainbuyan Purevsuren
October 5	Mongolia International: Host: Ulaanbaatar, Mongolia; Level: International Series; Format: 16MS/8WS/8MD/4WD/8XD	Score: 21–13, 21–17	
October 5	Mongolia International: Host: Ulaanbaatar, Mongolia; Level: International Series; Format: 16MS/8WS/8MD/4WD/8XD	(Slovakia) Monika Fašungová	(Mauritius) Karen Foo Kune
October 5	Mongolia International: Host: Ulaanbaatar, Mongolia; Level: International Series; Format: 16MS/8WS/8MD/4WD/8XD	Score: 18–21, 21–12, 21–15	
October 5	Mongolia International: Host: Ulaanbaatar, Mongolia; Level: International Series; Format: 16MS/8WS/8MD/4WD/8XD	(Mongolia) Davaasuren Batur (Mongolia) Zolzaya Munkhbaatar	(Mongolia) Erdenebayar Enkhbold (Slovakia) Michal Matejka
October 5	Mongolia International: Host: Ulaanbaatar, Mongolia; Level: International Series; Format: 16MS/8WS/8MD/4WD/8XD	Score: 21–16, 18–21, 24–22	
October 5	Mongolia International: Host: Ulaanbaatar, Mongolia; Level: International Series; Format: 16MS/8WS/8MD/4WD/8XD	(Mongolia) Dulamsuren Munkhbayar (Slovakia) Monika Fašungová	(Mongolia) Gerelmaa Batchuluun (Mongolia) Dolgorsuren Batsaikhan
October 5	Mongolia International: Host: Ulaanbaatar, Mongolia; Level: International Series; Format: 16MS/8WS/8MD/4WD/8XD	Score:	
October 5	Mongolia International: Host: Ulaanbaatar, Mongolia; Level: International Series; Format: 16MS/8WS/8MD/4WD/8XD	(Slovakia) Michal Matejka (Slovakia) Monika Fašungová	(Mongolia) Enkhbat Olonbayar (Mongolia) Gerelmaa Batchuluun
October 5	Mongolia International: Host: Ulaanbaatar, Mongolia; Level: International Series; Format: 16MS/8WS/8MD/4WD/8XD	Score: 20–22, 21–12, 21–14	
October 5	Cyprus International: Host: Nicosia, Cyprus; Level: International Series; Format: 32MS/32WS/32MD/16WD/32XD	(France) Simon Maunoury	(Spain) Ernesto Velázquez
October 5	Cyprus International: Host: Nicosia, Cyprus; Level: International Series; Format: 32MS/32WS/32MD/16WD/32XD	Score: 21–16, 21–13	
October 5	Cyprus International: Host: Nicosia, Cyprus; Level: International Series; Format: 32MS/32WS/32MD/16WD/32XD	(Slovenia) Špela Silvester	(Spain) Carolina Marín
October 5	Cyprus International: Host: Nicosia, Cyprus; Level: International Series; Format: 32MS/32WS/32MD/16WD/32XD	Score: 23–21, 23–21	
October 5	Cyprus International: Host: Nicosia, Cyprus; Level: International Series; Format: 32MS/32WS/32MD/16WD/32XD	(Denmark) Christopher Bruun Jensen (Denmark) Morten Kronborg	(France) Laurent Constantin (France) Sébastien Vincent
October 5	Cyprus International: Host: Nicosia, Cyprus; Level: International Series; Format: 32MS/32WS/32MD/16WD/32XD	Score: 21–16, 8–21, 21–17	
October 5	Cyprus International: Host: Nicosia, Cyprus; Level: International Series; Format: 32MS/32WS/32MD/16WD/32XD	(Russia) Anastasia Chervyakova (Russia) Natalia Perminova	(New Zealand) Danielle Barry (New Zealand) Donna Haliday
October 5	Cyprus International: Host: Nicosia, Cyprus; Level: International Series; Format: 32MS/32WS/32MD/16WD/32XD	Score: 21–18, 22–20	
October 5	Cyprus International: Host: Nicosia, Cyprus; Level: International Series; Format: 32MS/32WS/32MD/16WD/32XD	(New Zealand) Henry Tam (New Zealand) Donna Haliday	(Wales) Richard Vaughan (Wales) Sarah Thomas
October 5	Cyprus International: Host: Nicosia, Cyprus; Level: International Series; Format: 32MS/32WS/32MD/16WD/32XD	Score: 21–18, 21–14	
October 5	Brazil International: Host: São Paulo, Brazil; Level: Future Series; Format: 32MS/32WS/16MD/16WD/16XD	(Peru) Andres Corpancho	(Brazil) Thomas Moretti
October 5	Brazil International: Host: São Paulo, Brazil; Level: Future Series; Format: 32MS/32WS/16MD/16WD/16XD	Score: 23–21, 13–21, 21–12	
October 5	Brazil International: Host: São Paulo, Brazil; Level: Future Series; Format: 32MS/32WS/16MD/16WD/16XD	(Peru) Christina Aicardi	(Peru) Claudia Rivero
October 5	Brazil International: Host: São Paulo, Brazil; Level: Future Series; Format: 32MS/32WS/16MD/16WD/16XD	Score: 23–25, 21–19, 21–11	
October 5	Brazil International: Host: São Paulo, Brazil; Level: Future Series; Format: 32MS/32WS/16MD/16WD/16XD	(Peru) Antonio de Vinatea (Peru) Martín del Valle	(Peru) Mario Cuba (Peru) Bruno Monteverde
October 5	Brazil International: Host: São Paulo, Brazil; Level: Future Series; Format: 32MS/32WS/16MD/16WD/16XD	Score: 23–21, 21–12	
October 5	Brazil International: Host: São Paulo, Brazil; Level: Future Series; Format: 32MS/32WS/16MD/16WD/16XD	(Peru) Christina Aicardi (Peru) Alejandra Monteverde	(Peru) Katherine Winder (Peru) Claudia Zornoza
October 5	Brazil International: Host: São Paulo, Brazil; Level: Future Series; Format: 32MS/32WS/16MD/16WD/16XD	Score: 22–20, 23–21	
October 5	Brazil International: Host: São Paulo, Brazil; Level: Future Series; Format: 32MS/32WS/16MD/16WD/16XD	(Spain) Alejandro Barriga (Spain) Sandra Chirlaque	(Peru) Andres Corpancho (Peru) Lorena Duany
October 5	Brazil International: Host: São Paulo, Brazil; Level: Future Series; Format: 32MS/32WS/16MD/16WD/16XD	Score: 14–21, 21–17, 21–18	
October 12	Dutch Open: Host: Almere, Netherlands; Level: Grand Prix; Format: 32MS/32WS/32MD/32WD/32XD	(India) Chetan Anand	(Netherlands) Eric Pang
October 12	Dutch Open: Host: Almere, Netherlands; Level: Grand Prix; Format: 32MS/32WS/32MD/32WD/32XD	Score: 21–12, 21–15	
October 12	Dutch Open: Host: Almere, Netherlands; Level: Grand Prix; Format: 32MS/32WS/32MD/32WD/32XD	(Netherlands) Yao Jie	(Netherlands) Judith Meulendijks
October 12	Dutch Open: Host: Almere, Netherlands; Level: Grand Prix; Format: 32MS/32WS/32MD/32WD/32XD	Score: 21–11, 21–12	
October 12	Dutch Open: Host: Almere, Netherlands; Level: Grand Prix; Format: 32MS/32WS/32MD/32WD/32XD	(Germany) Kristof Hopp (Germany) Johannes Schöttler	(Germany) Michael Fuchs (Germany) Ingo Kindervater
October 12	Dutch Open: Host: Almere, Netherlands; Level: Grand Prix; Format: 32MS/32WS/32MD/32WD/32XD	Score: 21–15, 21–16	
October 12	Dutch Open: Host: Almere, Netherlands; Level: Grand Prix; Format: 32MS/32WS/32MD/32WD/32XD	(Russia) Valeria Sorokina (Russia) Nina Vislova	(Germany) Sandra Marinello (Germany) Birgit Overzier
October 12	Dutch Open: Host: Almere, Netherlands; Level: Grand Prix; Format: 32MS/32WS/32MD/32WD/32XD	Score: 21–13, 21–17	
October 12	Dutch Open: Host: Almere, Netherlands; Level: Grand Prix; Format: 32MS/32WS/32MD/32WD/32XD	(Russia) Aleksandr Nikolaenko (Russia) Valeria Sorokina	(Russia) Vitalij Durkin (Russia) Nina Vislova
October 12	Dutch Open: Host: Almere, Netherlands; Level: Grand Prix; Format: 32MS/32WS/32MD/32WD/32XD	Score: 13–21, 21–16, 21–12	
October 12	Guatemala International: Host: Guatemala City, Guatemala; Level: Future Series; Format: 32MS/16WS/16MD/16XD	(Guatemala) Kevin Cordón	(Guatemala) Rodolfo Ramírez
October 12	Guatemala International: Host: Guatemala City, Guatemala; Level: Future Series; Format: 32MS/16WS/16MD/16XD	Score: 21–16, 21–12	
October 12	Guatemala International: Host: Guatemala City, Guatemala; Level: Future Series; Format: 32MS/16WS/16MD/16XD	(Spain) Sandra Chirlaque	(Guatemala) Nikté Sotomayor
October 12	Guatemala International: Host: Guatemala City, Guatemala; Level: Future Series; Format: 32MS/16WS/16MD/16XD	Score: 21–17, 21–12	
October 12	Guatemala International: Host: Guatemala City, Guatemala; Level: Future Series; Format: 32MS/16WS/16MD/16XD	(Guatemala) Kevin Cordón (Guatemala) Rodolfo Ramírez	(United States) Mathew Fogarthy (United States) David Neumann
October 12	Guatemala International: Host: Guatemala City, Guatemala; Level: Future Series; Format: 32MS/16WS/16MD/16XD	Score: 21–16, 21–14	
October 12	Guatemala International: Host: Guatemala City, Guatemala; Level: Future Series; Format: 32MS/16WS/16MD/16XD	(Guatemala) Rodolfo Ramírez (Peru) Lorena Duany	(Spain) Alejandro Barriga (Spain) Sandra Chirlaque
October 12	Guatemala International: Host: Guatemala City, Guatemala; Level: Future Series; Format: 32MS/16WS/16MD/16XD	Score: 21–18, 21–15	
October 19	Denmark Open (Draw): Host: Odense, Denmark; Level: Superseries; Format: 32MS/32WS/32MD/32WD/32XD	(Indonesia) Simon Santoso	(Germany) Marc Zwiebler
October 19	Denmark Open (Draw): Host: Odense, Denmark; Level: Superseries; Format: 32MS/32WS/32MD/32WD/32XD	Score: 21–14, 21–6	
October 19	Denmark Open (Draw): Host: Odense, Denmark; Level: Superseries; Format: 32MS/32WS/32MD/32WD/32XD	(Denmark) Tine Rasmussen	(China) Wang Yihan
October 19	Denmark Open (Draw): Host: Odense, Denmark; Level: Superseries; Format: 32MS/32WS/32MD/32WD/32XD	Score: 21–18, 19–21, 21–14	
October 19	Denmark Open (Draw): Host: Odense, Denmark; Level: Superseries; Format: 32MS/32WS/32MD/32WD/32XD	(Malaysia) Koo Kien Keat (Malaysia) Tan Boon Heong	(Denmark) Mathias Boe (Denmark) Carsten Mogensen
October 19	Denmark Open (Draw): Host: Odense, Denmark; Level: Superseries; Format: 32MS/32WS/32MD/32WD/32XD	Score: 20–22, 21–14, 21–17	
October 19	Denmark Open (Draw): Host: Odense, Denmark; Level: Superseries; Format: 32MS/32WS/32MD/32WD/32XD	(China) Pan Pan (China) Zhang Yawen	(Denmark) Kamilla Rytter Juhl (Denmark) Lena Frier Kristiansen
October 19	Denmark Open (Draw): Host: Odense, Denmark; Level: Superseries; Format: 32MS/32WS/32MD/32WD/32XD	Score: 22–20, 18–21, 21–12	
October 19	Denmark Open (Draw): Host: Odense, Denmark; Level: Superseries; Format: 32MS/32WS/32MD/32WD/32XD	(Denmark) Joachim Fischer Nielsen (Denmark) Christinna Pedersen	(England) Anthony Clark (England) Donna Kellogg
October 19	Denmark Open (Draw): Host: Odense, Denmark; Level: Superseries; Format: 32MS/32WS/32MD/32WD/32XD	Score: 21–16, 25–27, 21–17	
October 19	Pan Am Badminton Championships (Draw): Host: Guadalajara, Mexico; Level: Continental Championships; Format: 8XT/64MS/32WS/32MD/16WD/32XD	Canada; Players: Adrian Liu, Toby Ng, Alexander Pang, Joseph Rogers, Alex Bruce, Grace Gao, Joycelyn Ko, Anna Rice	Peru; Players: Andres Corpancho, Antonio de Vinatea, Martín del Valle, Rodrigo Pacheco, Christina Aicardi, Alejandra Monteverde, Claudia Rivero, Claudia Zornoza
October 19	Pan Am Badminton Championships (Draw): Host: Guadalajara, Mexico; Level: Continental Championships; Format: 8XT/64MS/32WS/32MD/16WD/32XD	Score: 3–0	
October 19	Pan Am Badminton Championships (Draw): Host: Guadalajara, Mexico; Level: Continental Championships; Format: 8XT/64MS/32WS/32MD/16WD/32XD	(Guatemala) Kevin Cordón	(Canada) Stephan Wojcikiewicz
October 19	Pan Am Badminton Championships (Draw): Host: Guadalajara, Mexico; Level: Continental Championships; Format: 8XT/64MS/32WS/32MD/16WD/32XD	Score: 21–11, 21–19	
October 19	Pan Am Badminton Championships (Draw): Host: Guadalajara, Mexico; Level: Continental Championships; Format: 8XT/64MS/32WS/32MD/16WD/32XD	(Canada) Anna Rice	(Canada) Joycelyn Ko
October 19	Pan Am Badminton Championships (Draw): Host: Guadalajara, Mexico; Level: Continental Championships; Format: 8XT/64MS/32WS/32MD/16WD/32XD	Score: 21–17, 21–14	
October 19	Pan Am Badminton Championships (Draw): Host: Guadalajara, Mexico; Level: Continental Championships; Format: 8XT/64MS/32WS/32MD/16WD/32XD	(Guatemala) Kevin Cordón (Guatemala) Rodolfo Ramírez	(Peru) Antonio de Vinatea (Peru) Martín del Valle
October 19	Pan Am Badminton Championships (Draw): Host: Guadalajara, Mexico; Level: Continental Championships; Format: 8XT/64MS/32WS/32MD/16WD/32XD	Score: 21–18, 17–21, 23–21	
October 19	Pan Am Badminton Championships (Draw): Host: Guadalajara, Mexico; Level: Continental Championships; Format: 8XT/64MS/32WS/32MD/16WD/32XD	(Canada) Milaine Cloutier (Canada) Valerie Jacques	(Canada) Fiona McKee (Canada) Grace Gao
October 19	Pan Am Badminton Championships (Draw): Host: Guadalajara, Mexico; Level: Continental Championships; Format: 8XT/64MS/32WS/32MD/16WD/32XD	Score: 13–21, 21–14, 21–17	
October 19	Pan Am Badminton Championships (Draw): Host: Guadalajara, Mexico; Level: Continental Championships; Format: 8XT/64MS/32WS/32MD/16WD/32XD	(Canada) Toby Ng (Canada) Grace Gao	(Canada) Alexander Pang (Canada) Joycelyn Ko
October 19	Pan Am Badminton Championships (Draw): Host: Guadalajara, Mexico; Level: Continental Championships; Format: 8XT/64MS/32WS/32MD/16WD/32XD	Score: 21–15, 21–16	
October 19	Slovak Open: Host: Prešov, Slovakia; Level: Future Series; Format: 32MS/32WS/32MD/16WD/16XD	(Italy) Wisnu Haryo Putro	(England) Ben Beckman
October 19	Slovak Open: Host: Prešov, Slovakia; Level: Future Series; Format: 32MS/32WS/32MD/16WD/16XD	Score: 21–13, 17–21, 21–14	
October 19	Slovak Open: Host: Prešov, Slovakia; Level: Future Series; Format: 32MS/32WS/32MD/16WD/16XD	(Belarus) Alesia Zaitsava	(Indonesia) Gustiani Megawati
October 19	Slovak Open: Host: Prešov, Slovakia; Level: Future Series; Format: 32MS/32WS/32MD/16WD/16XD	Score: 17–21, 21–19, 21–10	
October 19	Slovak Open: Host: Prešov, Slovakia; Level: Future Series; Format: 32MS/32WS/32MD/16WD/16XD	(Czech Republic) Ondřej Kopřiva (Czech Republic) Tomáš Kopřiva	(Denmark) Søren Gravholt (Denmark) Christian Westergaard Nielsen
October 19	Slovak Open: Host: Prešov, Slovakia; Level: Future Series; Format: 32MS/32WS/32MD/16WD/16XD	Score: 21–18, 21–12	
October 19	Slovak Open: Host: Prešov, Slovakia; Level: Future Series; Format: 32MS/32WS/32MD/16WD/16XD	(Denmark) Maria Lykke Andersen (Denmark) Karina Sørensen	(Ukraine) Marija Ulitina (Ukraine) Natalya Voytsekh
October 19	Slovak Open: Host: Prešov, Slovakia; Level: Future Series; Format: 32MS/32WS/32MD/16WD/16XD	Score: 21–17, 21–10	
October 19	Slovak Open: Host: Prešov, Slovakia; Level: Future Series; Format: 32MS/32WS/32MD/16WD/16XD	(Denmark) Mark Philip Winther (Denmark) Karina Sørensen	(Belarus) Aleksei Konakh (Belarus) Alesia Zaitsava
October 19	Slovak Open: Host: Prešov, Slovakia; Level: Future Series; Format: 32MS/32WS/32MD/16WD/16XD	Score: 18–21, 21–9, 21–13	
October 19	BWF World Junior Championships (Draw): Host: Alor Setar, Malaysia; Level: Suhandinata & Eye Level Cup; Format: 22XT/128MS/128WS/64MD/64WD/128XD	China	Malaysia
October 19	BWF World Junior Championships (Draw): Host: Alor Setar, Malaysia; Level: Suhandinata & Eye Level Cup; Format: 22XT/128MS/128WS/64MD/64WD/128XD	Score: 3–0	
October 19	BWF World Junior Championships (Draw): Host: Alor Setar, Malaysia; Level: Suhandinata & Eye Level Cup; Format: 22XT/128MS/128WS/64MD/64WD/128XD	(China) Tian Houwei	(Malaysia) Iskandar Zulkarnain Zainuddin
October 19	BWF World Junior Championships (Draw): Host: Alor Setar, Malaysia; Level: Suhandinata & Eye Level Cup; Format: 22XT/128MS/128WS/64MD/64WD/128XD	Score: 21–12, 21–17	
October 19	BWF World Junior Championships (Draw): Host: Alor Setar, Malaysia; Level: Suhandinata & Eye Level Cup; Format: 22XT/128MS/128WS/64MD/64WD/128XD	(Thailand) Ratchanok Intanon	(Thailand) Porntip Buranaprasertsuk
October 19	BWF World Junior Championships (Draw): Host: Alor Setar, Malaysia; Level: Suhandinata & Eye Level Cup; Format: 22XT/128MS/128WS/64MD/64WD/128XD	Score: 21–15, 21–23, 21–10	
October 19	BWF World Junior Championships (Draw): Host: Alor Setar, Malaysia; Level: Suhandinata & Eye Level Cup; Format: 22XT/128MS/128WS/64MD/64WD/128XD	(Malaysia) Chooi Kah Ming (Malaysia) Ow Yao Han	(Indonesia) Berry Angriawan (Indonesia) Muhammad Ulinnuha
October 19	BWF World Junior Championships (Draw): Host: Alor Setar, Malaysia; Level: Suhandinata & Eye Level Cup; Format: 22XT/128MS/128WS/64MD/64WD/128XD	Score: 19–21, 21–12, 23–21	
October 19	BWF World Junior Championships (Draw): Host: Alor Setar, Malaysia; Level: Suhandinata & Eye Level Cup; Format: 22XT/128MS/128WS/64MD/64WD/128XD	(China) Tang Jinhua (China) Xia Huan	(Indonesia) Suci Rizky Andini (Indonesia) Tiara Rosalia Nuraidah
October 19	BWF World Junior Championships (Draw): Host: Alor Setar, Malaysia; Level: Suhandinata & Eye Level Cup; Format: 22XT/128MS/128WS/64MD/64WD/128XD	Score: 21–9, 21–18	
October 19	BWF World Junior Championships (Draw): Host: Alor Setar, Malaysia; Level: Suhandinata & Eye Level Cup; Format: 22XT/128MS/128WS/64MD/64WD/128XD	(Thailand) Maneepong Jongjit (Thailand) Rodjana Chuthabunditkul	(Indonesia) Angga Pratama (Indonesia) Della Destiara Haris
October 19	BWF World Junior Championships (Draw): Host: Alor Setar, Malaysia; Level: Suhandinata & Eye Level Cup; Format: 22XT/128MS/128WS/64MD/64WD/128XD	Score: 21–19, 14–21, 21–17	
October 26	French Open (Draw): Host: Paris, France; Level: Superseries; Format: 32MS/32WS/32MD/32WD/32XD	(China) Lin Dan	(Indonesia) Taufik Hidayat
October 26	French Open (Draw): Host: Paris, France; Level: Superseries; Format: 32MS/32WS/32MD/32WD/32XD	Score: 21–6, 21–15	
October 26	French Open (Draw): Host: Paris, France; Level: Superseries; Format: 32MS/32WS/32MD/32WD/32XD	(China) Wang Yihan	(China) Wang Lin
October 26	French Open (Draw): Host: Paris, France; Level: Superseries; Format: 32MS/32WS/32MD/32WD/32XD	Score: 21–9, 21–12	
October 26	French Open (Draw): Host: Paris, France; Level: Superseries; Format: 32MS/32WS/32MD/32WD/32XD	(Indonesia) Markis Kido (Indonesia) Hendra Setiawan	(Malaysia) Koo Kien Keat (Malaysia) Tan Boon Heong
October 26	French Open (Draw): Host: Paris, France; Level: Superseries; Format: 32MS/32WS/32MD/32WD/32XD	Score: 15–21, 21–15, 21–14	
October 26	French Open (Draw): Host: Paris, France; Level: Superseries; Format: 32MS/32WS/32MD/32WD/32XD	(China) Ma Jin (China) Wang Xiaoli	(China) Cheng Shu (China) Zhao Yunlei
October 26	French Open (Draw): Host: Paris, France; Level: Superseries; Format: 32MS/32WS/32MD/32WD/32XD	Score: 21–13, 21–8	
October 26	French Open (Draw): Host: Paris, France; Level: Superseries; Format: 32MS/32WS/32MD/32WD/32XD	(Indonesia) Nova Widianto (Indonesia) Liliyana Natsir	(Indonesia) Hendra Aprida Gunawan (Indonesia) Vita Marissa
October 26	French Open (Draw): Host: Paris, France; Level: Superseries; Format: 32MS/32WS/32MD/32WD/32XD	Score: 21–7, 21–7	
October 26	Santo Domingo Open: Host: Santo Domingo, Dominican Republic; Level: International Series; Format: 64MS/32WS/16MD/16WD/16XD	(Guatemala) Kevin Cordón	(Guatemala) Rodolfo Ramírez
October 26	Santo Domingo Open: Host: Santo Domingo, Dominican Republic; Level: International Series; Format: 64MS/32WS/16MD/16WD/16XD	Score: 21–17, 21–12	
October 26	Santo Domingo Open: Host: Santo Domingo, Dominican Republic; Level: International Series; Format: 64MS/32WS/16MD/16WD/16XD	(Slovenia) Maja Tvrdy	(Canada) Anna Rice
October 26	Santo Domingo Open: Host: Santo Domingo, Dominican Republic; Level: International Series; Format: 64MS/32WS/16MD/16WD/16XD	Score: 21–19, 21–23, 21–18	
October 26	Santo Domingo Open: Host: Santo Domingo, Dominican Republic; Level: International Series; Format: 64MS/32WS/16MD/16WD/16XD	(Guatemala) Kevin Cordón (Guatemala) Rodolfo Ramírez	(United States) Phillip Chew (United States) Halim Haryanto
October 26	Santo Domingo Open: Host: Santo Domingo, Dominican Republic; Level: International Series; Format: 64MS/32WS/16MD/16WD/16XD	Score: 21–23, 15–21, 21–17	
October 26	Santo Domingo Open: Host: Santo Domingo, Dominican Republic; Level: International Series; Format: 64MS/32WS/16MD/16WD/16XD	(Peru) Christina Aicardi (Peru) Claudia Rivero	(Peru) Katherine Winder (Peru) Claudia Zornoza
October 26	Santo Domingo Open: Host: Santo Domingo, Dominican Republic; Level: International Series; Format: 64MS/32WS/16MD/16WD/16XD	Score: 21–15, 21–16	
October 26	Santo Domingo Open: Host: Santo Domingo, Dominican Republic; Level: International Series; Format: 64MS/32WS/16MD/16WD/16XD	(Peru) Mario Cuba (Peru) Katherine Winder	(Peru) Bruno Monteverde (Peru) Claudia Zornoza
October 26	Santo Domingo Open: Host: Santo Domingo, Dominican Republic; Level: International Series; Format: 64MS/32WS/16MD/16WD/16XD	Score: 21–14, 21–16	
October 26	Hungarian International: Host: Budapest, Hungary; Level: International Series; Format: 32MS/32WS/32MD/32WD/32XD	(Germany) Dieter Domke	(Sweden) Magnus Sahlberg
October 26	Hungarian International: Host: Budapest, Hungary; Level: International Series; Format: 32MS/32WS/32MD/32WD/32XD	Score: 21–14, 21–10	
October 26	Hungarian International: Host: Budapest, Hungary; Level: International Series; Format: 32MS/32WS/32MD/32WD/32XD	(Switzerland) Jeanine Cicognini	(Russia) Tatjana Bibik
October 26	Hungarian International: Host: Budapest, Hungary; Level: International Series; Format: 32MS/32WS/32MD/32WD/32XD	Score: 22–20, 21–12	
October 26	Hungarian International: Host: Budapest, Hungary; Level: International Series; Format: 32MS/32WS/32MD/32WD/32XD	(Poland) Adam Cwalina (Poland) Wojciech Szkudlarczyk	(Russia) Vladimir Ivanov (Russia) Ivan Sozonov
October 26	Hungarian International: Host: Budapest, Hungary; Level: International Series; Format: 32MS/32WS/32MD/32WD/32XD	Score: 21–17, 13–21, 28–26	
October 26	Hungarian International: Host: Budapest, Hungary; Level: International Series; Format: 32MS/32WS/32MD/32WD/32XD	(Russia) Tatjana Bibik (Russia) Olga Golovanova	(Russia) Irina Khlebko (Russia) Ksenia Polikarpova
October 26	Hungarian International: Host: Budapest, Hungary; Level: International Series; Format: 32MS/32WS/32MD/32WD/32XD	Score: 21–16, 17–21, 21–13	
October 26	Hungarian International: Host: Budapest, Hungary; Level: International Series; Format: 32MS/32WS/32MD/32WD/32XD	(Poland) Wojciech Szkudlarczyk (Poland) Agnieszka Wojtkowska	(Germany) Peter Käsbauer (Germany) Johanna Goliszewski
October 26	Hungarian International: Host: Budapest, Hungary; Level: International Series; Format: 32MS/32WS/32MD/32WD/32XD	Score: 21–15, 8–21, 21–10	

=== November ===
Week of	Tournament	Champions	Runners-up
November 1	Iceland International: Host: Reykjavík, Iceland; Level: International Series; Format: 32MS/32WS/32MD/16WD/32XD	(Denmark) Christian Lind Thomsen	(Denmark) Kasper Ødum
November 1	Iceland International: Host: Reykjavík, Iceland; Level: International Series; Format: 32MS/32WS/32MD/16WD/32XD	Score: 21–8, 21–17	
November 1	Iceland International: Host: Reykjavík, Iceland; Level: International Series; Format: 32MS/32WS/32MD/16WD/32XD	(Iceland) Ragna Ingólfsdóttir	(Denmark) Camilla Overgaard
November 1	Iceland International: Host: Reykjavík, Iceland; Level: International Series; Format: 32MS/32WS/32MD/16WD/32XD	Score: 21–14, 16–21, 21–13	
November 1	Iceland International: Host: Reykjavík, Iceland; Level: International Series; Format: 32MS/32WS/32MD/16WD/32XD	(Denmark) Anders Skaarup Rasmussen (Denmark) René Lindskow	(Denmark) Christopher Bruun Jensen (Denmark) Thomas Fynbo
November 1	Iceland International: Host: Reykjavík, Iceland; Level: International Series; Format: 32MS/32WS/32MD/16WD/32XD	Score: 21–16, 21–16	
November 1	Iceland International: Host: Reykjavík, Iceland; Level: International Series; Format: 32MS/32WS/32MD/16WD/32XD	(Iceland) Ragna Ingólfsdóttir (Iceland) Snjólaug Jóhannsdóttir	(Iceland) Brynja Pétursdóttir (Iceland) Erla Björg Hafsteinsdóttir
November 1	Iceland International: Host: Reykjavík, Iceland; Level: International Series; Format: 32MS/32WS/32MD/16WD/32XD	Score: 21–10, 21–13	
November 1	Iceland International: Host: Reykjavík, Iceland; Level: International Series; Format: 32MS/32WS/32MD/16WD/32XD	(Denmark) Theis Christiansen (Denmark) Joan Christiansen	(Denmark) Niklas Hoff (Denmark) Amalie Fangel
November 1	Iceland International: Host: Reykjavík, Iceland; Level: International Series; Format: 32MS/32WS/32MD/16WD/32XD	Score: 23–21, 20–22, 21–16	
November 1	Puerto Rico International: Host: Guaynabo, Puerto Rico; Level: International Challenge; Format: 64MS/32WS/32MD/16WD/16XD	(Guatemala) Kevin Cordón	(Portugal) Pedro Martins
November 1	Puerto Rico International: Host: Guaynabo, Puerto Rico; Level: International Challenge; Format: 64MS/32WS/32MD/16WD/16XD	Score: 18–21, 21–13, 21–17	
November 1	Puerto Rico International: Host: Guaynabo, Puerto Rico; Level: International Challenge; Format: 64MS/32WS/32MD/16WD/16XD	(Canada) Anna Rice	(Slovenia) Maja Tvrdy
November 1	Puerto Rico International: Host: Guaynabo, Puerto Rico; Level: International Challenge; Format: 64MS/32WS/32MD/16WD/16XD	Score: 13–21, 21–12, 21–13	
November 1	Puerto Rico International: Host: Guaynabo, Puerto Rico; Level: International Challenge; Format: 64MS/32WS/32MD/16WD/16XD	(Guatemala) Kevin Cordón (Guatemala) Rodolfo Ramírez	(United States) Phillip Chew (United States) Halim Haryanto
November 1	Puerto Rico International: Host: Guaynabo, Puerto Rico; Level: International Challenge; Format: 64MS/32WS/32MD/16WD/16XD	Score: 21–19, 13–21, 21–16	
November 1	Puerto Rico International: Host: Guaynabo, Puerto Rico; Level: International Challenge; Format: 64MS/32WS/32MD/16WD/16XD	(Peru) Christina Aicardi (Peru) Claudia Rivero	(Peru) Katherine Winder (Peru) Claudia Zornoza
November 1	Puerto Rico International: Host: Guaynabo, Puerto Rico; Level: International Challenge; Format: 64MS/32WS/32MD/16WD/16XD	Score: 21–10, 24–22	
November 1	Puerto Rico International: Host: Guaynabo, Puerto Rico; Level: International Challenge; Format: 64MS/32WS/32MD/16WD/16XD	(Peru) Bruno Monteverde (Peru) Claudia Zornoza	(Peru) Mario Cuba (Peru) Katherine Winder
November 1	Puerto Rico International: Host: Guaynabo, Puerto Rico; Level: International Challenge; Format: 64MS/32WS/32MD/16WD/16XD	Score: 21–17, 21–19	
November 9	Hong Kong Open (Draw): Host: Hong Kong; Level: Superseries; Format: 32MS/32WS/32MD/32WD/32XD	(Malaysia) Lee Chong Wei	(Denmark) Peter Gade
November 9	Hong Kong Open (Draw): Host: Hong Kong; Level: Superseries; Format: 32MS/32WS/32MD/32WD/32XD	Score: 21–13, 13–21, 21–16	
November 9	Hong Kong Open (Draw): Host: Hong Kong; Level: Superseries; Format: 32MS/32WS/32MD/32WD/32XD	(China) Wang Yihan	(China) Jiang Yanjiao
November 9	Hong Kong Open (Draw): Host: Hong Kong; Level: Superseries; Format: 32MS/32WS/32MD/32WD/32XD	Score: 21–13, 21–15	
November 9	Hong Kong Open (Draw): Host: Hong Kong; Level: Superseries; Format: 32MS/32WS/32MD/32WD/32XD	(South Korea) Jung Jae-sung (South Korea) Lee Yong-dae	(Denmark) Lars Paaske (Denmark) Jonas Rasmussen
November 9	Hong Kong Open (Draw): Host: Hong Kong; Level: Superseries; Format: 32MS/32WS/32MD/32WD/32XD	Score: 13–21, 21–15, 21–8	
November 9	Hong Kong Open (Draw): Host: Hong Kong; Level: Superseries; Format: 32MS/32WS/32MD/32WD/32XD	(China) Ma Jin (China) Wang Xiaoli	(China) Du Jing (China) Yu Yang
November 9	Hong Kong Open (Draw): Host: Hong Kong; Level: Superseries; Format: 32MS/32WS/32MD/32WD/32XD	Score: 16–21, 21–19, 21–12	
November 9	Hong Kong Open (Draw): Host: Hong Kong; Level: Superseries; Format: 32MS/32WS/32MD/32WD/32XD	(Poland) Robert Mateusiak (Poland) Nadieżda Kostiuczyk	(Indonesia) Nova Widianto (Indonesia) Liliyana Natsir
November 9	Hong Kong Open (Draw): Host: Hong Kong; Level: Superseries; Format: 32MS/32WS/32MD/32WD/32XD	Score: 22–20, 21–16	
November 9	Miami Pan Am International: Host: Miami, United States; Level: Future Series; Format: 64MS/32WS/16MD/8WD/32XD	(United States) Hock Lai Lee	(Denmark) Sune Gavnholt
November 9	Miami Pan Am International: Host: Miami, United States; Level: Future Series; Format: 64MS/32WS/16MD/8WD/32XD	Score: 21–17, 17–21, 21–13	
November 9	Miami Pan Am International: Host: Miami, United States; Level: Future Series; Format: 64MS/32WS/16MD/8WD/32XD	(Canada) Joycelyn Ko	(United States) Karyn Velez
November 9	Miami Pan Am International: Host: Miami, United States; Level: Future Series; Format: 64MS/32WS/16MD/8WD/32XD	Score: 21–15, 15–21, 21–19	
November 9	Miami Pan Am International: Host: Miami, United States; Level: Future Series; Format: 64MS/32WS/16MD/8WD/32XD	(United States) Sameera Gunatileka (United States) Vincent Nguy	(Spain) Jose Vicente Martinez (Spain) Alejandro Villar
November 9	Miami Pan Am International: Host: Miami, United States; Level: Future Series; Format: 64MS/32WS/16MD/8WD/32XD	Score: 21–7, 21–14	
November 9	Miami Pan Am International: Host: Miami, United States; Level: Future Series; Format: 64MS/32WS/16MD/8WD/32XD	(United States) Priscilla Lun (United States) Paula Lynn Obañana	(Spain) Sandra Chirlaque (Peru) Alejandra Monteverde
November 9	Miami Pan Am International: Host: Miami, United States; Level: Future Series; Format: 64MS/32WS/16MD/8WD/32XD	Score: 22–20, 13–21, 21–13	
November 9	Miami Pan Am International: Host: Miami, United States; Level: Future Series; Format: 64MS/32WS/16MD/8WD/32XD	(United States) Hock Lai Lee (United States) Priscilla Lun	(Canada) Alexander Pang (Canada) Joycelyn Ko
November 9	Miami Pan Am International: Host: Miami, United States; Level: Future Series; Format: 64MS/32WS/16MD/8WD/32XD	Score: 21–14, 21–15	
November 9	Norwegian International: Host: Oslo, Norway; Level: International Challenge; Format: 32MS/32WS/32MD/32WD/32XD	(Denmark) Hans-Kristian Vittinghus	(Germany) Marc Zwiebler
November 9	Norwegian International: Host: Oslo, Norway; Level: International Challenge; Format: 32MS/32WS/32MD/32WD/32XD	Score: 15–21, 21–18, 21–19	
November 9	Norwegian International: Host: Oslo, Norway; Level: International Challenge; Format: 32MS/32WS/32MD/32WD/32XD	(Germany) Juliane Schenk	(Netherlands) Rachel van Cutsen
November 9	Norwegian International: Host: Oslo, Norway; Level: International Challenge; Format: 32MS/32WS/32MD/32WD/32XD	Score: 21–12, 19–21, 21–11	
November 9	Norwegian International: Host: Oslo, Norway; Level: International Challenge; Format: 32MS/32WS/32MD/32WD/32XD	(Denmark) Rasmus Bonde (Denmark) Simon Mollyhus	(Germany) Kristof Hopp (Germany) Johannes Schöttler
November 9	Norwegian International: Host: Oslo, Norway; Level: International Challenge; Format: 32MS/32WS/32MD/32WD/32XD	Score: 18–21, 21–17, 21–19	
November 9	Norwegian International: Host: Oslo, Norway; Level: International Challenge; Format: 32MS/32WS/32MD/32WD/32XD	(Denmark) Helle Nielsen (Denmark) Marie Røpke	(Netherlands) Samantha Barning (Netherlands) Eefje Muskens
November 9	Norwegian International: Host: Oslo, Norway; Level: International Challenge; Format: 32MS/32WS/32MD/32WD/32XD	Score: 21–13, 21–18	
November 9	Norwegian International: Host: Oslo, Norway; Level: International Challenge; Format: 32MS/32WS/32MD/32WD/32XD	(England) Marcus Ellis (England) Heather Olver	(England) Robin Middleton (England) Mariana Agathangelou
November 9	Norwegian International: Host: Oslo, Norway; Level: International Challenge; Format: 32MS/32WS/32MD/32WD/32XD	Score: 21–19, 21–17	
November 9	South Africa International: Host: South Africa; Level: International Series; Format: 64MS/32WS/32MD/16WD/32XD	(Iran) Ali Shahhosseini	(Iran) Mohammad Reza Kheradmandi
November 9	South Africa International: Host: South Africa; Level: International Series; Format: 64MS/32WS/32MD/16WD/32XD	Score: 22–20, 21–17	
November 9	South Africa International: Host: South Africa; Level: International Series; Format: 64MS/32WS/32MD/16WD/32XD	(South Africa) Michelle Edwards	(Iran) Negin Amiripour
November 9	South Africa International: Host: South Africa; Level: International Series; Format: 64MS/32WS/32MD/16WD/32XD	Score: 21–15, 21–18	
November 9	South Africa International: Host: South Africa; Level: International Series; Format: 64MS/32WS/32MD/16WD/32XD	(South Africa) Dorian James (South Africa) Willem Viljoen	(Iran) Mohammad Reza Kheradmandi (Iran) Ali Shahhosseini
November 9	South Africa International: Host: South Africa; Level: International Series; Format: 64MS/32WS/32MD/16WD/32XD	Score: 22–20, 17–21, 21–15	
November 9	South Africa International: Host: South Africa; Level: International Series; Format: 64MS/32WS/32MD/16WD/32XD	(South Africa) Michelle Edwards (South Africa) Annari Viljoen	(Iran) Negin Amiripour (Iran) Sahar Zamanian
November 9	South Africa International: Host: South Africa; Level: International Series; Format: 64MS/32WS/32MD/16WD/32XD	Score: 21–16, 21–14	
November 9	South Africa International: Host: South Africa; Level: International Series; Format: 64MS/32WS/32MD/16WD/32XD	(South Africa) Dorian James (South Africa) Michelle Edwards	(South Africa) Willem Viljoen (South Africa) Jade Morgan
November 9	South Africa International: Host: South Africa; Level: International Series; Format: 64MS/32WS/32MD/16WD/32XD	Score: 21–11, 21–17	
November 16	China Open (Draw): Host: Shanghai, China; Level: Superseries; Format: 32MS/32WS/32MD/32WD/32XD	(China) Lin Dan	(Denmark) Jan Ø. Jørgensen
November 16	China Open (Draw): Host: Shanghai, China; Level: Superseries; Format: 32MS/32WS/32MD/32WD/32XD	Score: 21–12, 21–12	
November 16	China Open (Draw): Host: Shanghai, China; Level: Superseries; Format: 32MS/32WS/32MD/32WD/32XD	(China) Jiang Yanjiao	(China) Wang Xin
November 16	China Open (Draw): Host: Shanghai, China; Level: Superseries; Format: 32MS/32WS/32MD/32WD/32XD	Score: 21–19, 22–20	
November 16	China Open (Draw): Host: Shanghai, China; Level: Superseries; Format: 32MS/32WS/32MD/32WD/32XD	(South Korea) Jung Jae-sung (South Korea) Lee Yong-dae	(Malaysia) Koo Kien Keat (Malaysia) Tan Boon Heong
November 16	China Open (Draw): Host: Shanghai, China; Level: Superseries; Format: 32MS/32WS/32MD/32WD/32XD	Score: 21–13, 19–21, 21–18	
November 16	China Open (Draw): Host: Shanghai, China; Level: Superseries; Format: 32MS/32WS/32MD/32WD/32XD	(China) Tian Qing (China) Zhang Yawen	(China) Du Jing (China) Yu Yang
November 16	China Open (Draw): Host: Shanghai, China; Level: Superseries; Format: 32MS/32WS/32MD/32WD/32XD	Score: 21–14, 21–14	
November 16	China Open (Draw): Host: Shanghai, China; Level: Superseries; Format: 32MS/32WS/32MD/32WD/32XD	(South Korea) Lee Yong-dae (South Korea) Lee Hyo-jung	(China) Zheng Bo (China) Ma Jin
November 16	China Open (Draw): Host: Shanghai, China; Level: Superseries; Format: 32MS/32WS/32MD/32WD/32XD	Score: 21–18, 15–21, 21–15	
November 16	Malaysia International: Host: Ipoh, Perak, Malaysia; Level: International Challenge; Format: 64MS/32WS/32MD/32WD/32XD	(Malaysia) Chong Wei Feng	(Malaysia) Chan Kwong Beng
November 16	Malaysia International: Host: Ipoh, Perak, Malaysia; Level: International Challenge; Format: 64MS/32WS/32MD/32WD/32XD	Score: 21–17, 21–14	
November 16	Malaysia International: Host: Ipoh, Perak, Malaysia; Level: International Challenge; Format: 64MS/32WS/32MD/32WD/32XD	(Thailand) Sapsiree Taerattanachai	(Thailand) Ratchanok Intanon
November 16	Malaysia International: Host: Ipoh, Perak, Malaysia; Level: International Challenge; Format: 64MS/32WS/32MD/32WD/32XD	Score: 21–11, 19–21, 22–20	
November 16	Malaysia International: Host: Ipoh, Perak, Malaysia; Level: International Challenge; Format: 64MS/32WS/32MD/32WD/32XD	(Malaysia) Lim Khim Wah (Malaysia) Chan Peng Soon	(Thailand) Bodin Isara (Thailand) Maneepong Jongjit
November 16	Malaysia International: Host: Ipoh, Perak, Malaysia; Level: International Challenge; Format: 64MS/32WS/32MD/32WD/32XD	Score: 22–20, 28–26	
November 16	Malaysia International: Host: Ipoh, Perak, Malaysia; Level: International Challenge; Format: 64MS/32WS/32MD/32WD/32XD	(Japan) Rie Eto (Japan) Yu Wakita	(Malaysia) Woon Khe Wei (Malaysia) Chong Sook Chin
November 16	Malaysia International: Host: Ipoh, Perak, Malaysia; Level: International Challenge; Format: 64MS/32WS/32MD/32WD/32XD	Score: 21–18, 21–11	
November 16	Malaysia International: Host: Ipoh, Perak, Malaysia; Level: International Challenge; Format: 64MS/32WS/32MD/32WD/32XD	(Malaysia) Tan Wee Kiong (Malaysia) Woon Khe Wei	(Malaysia) Mak Hee Chun (Malaysia) Ng Hui Lin
November 16	Malaysia International: Host: Ipoh, Perak, Malaysia; Level: International Challenge; Format: 64MS/32WS/32MD/32WD/32XD	Score: 21–6, 13–21, 21–17	
November 16	Scotland International: Host: Glasgow, Scotland; Level: International Challenge; Format: 64MS/64WS/32MD/32WD/32XD	(Germany) Marc Zwiebler	(Denmark) Peter Mikkelsen
November 16	Scotland International: Host: Glasgow, Scotland; Level: International Challenge; Format: 64MS/64WS/32MD/32WD/32XD	Score: 21–15, 15–21, 21–16	
November 16	Scotland International: Host: Glasgow, Scotland; Level: International Challenge; Format: 64MS/64WS/32MD/32WD/32XD	(Scotland) Susan Egelstaff	(Russia) Ella Diehl
November 16	Scotland International: Host: Glasgow, Scotland; Level: International Challenge; Format: 64MS/64WS/32MD/32WD/32XD	Score: 21–18, 21–10	
November 16	Scotland International: Host: Glasgow, Scotland; Level: International Challenge; Format: 64MS/64WS/32MD/32WD/32XD	(Denmark) Mads Conrad-Petersen (Denmark) Mads Pieler Kolding	(England) Chris Langridge (England) Robin Middleton
November 16	Scotland International: Host: Glasgow, Scotland; Level: International Challenge; Format: 64MS/64WS/32MD/32WD/32XD	Score: 19–21, 26–24, 21–11	
November 16	Scotland International: Host: Glasgow, Scotland; Level: International Challenge; Format: 64MS/64WS/32MD/32WD/32XD	(Russia) Valeria Sorokina (Russia) Nina Vislova	(England) Mariana Agathangelou (Scotland) Emma Mason
November 16	Scotland International: Host: Glasgow, Scotland; Level: International Challenge; Format: 64MS/64WS/32MD/32WD/32XD	Score: 21–16, 21–16	
November 16	Scotland International: Host: Glasgow, Scotland; Level: International Challenge; Format: 64MS/64WS/32MD/32WD/32XD	(Russia) Aleksandr Nikolaenko (Russia) Valeria Sorokina	(Australia) Raj Veeran (Australia) Renuga Veeran
November 16	Scotland International: Host: Glasgow, Scotland; Level: International Challenge; Format: 64MS/64WS/32MD/32WD/32XD	Score: 21–11, 21–16	
November 16	Suriname International: Host: Paramaribo, Suriname; Level: Future Series; Format: 32MS/16WS/16MD/16XD	(Suriname) Virgil Soeroredjo	(Brazil) Daniel Paiola
November 16	Suriname International: Host: Paramaribo, Suriname; Level: Future Series; Format: 32MS/16WS/16MD/16XD	Score: 21–19, 21–13	
November 16	Suriname International: Host: Paramaribo, Suriname; Level: Future Series; Format: 32MS/16WS/16MD/16XD	(Suriname) Danielle Melchiot	(Suriname) Crystal Leefmans
November 16	Suriname International: Host: Paramaribo, Suriname; Level: Future Series; Format: 32MS/16WS/16MD/16XD	Score: 21–14, 18–21, 21–14	
November 16	Suriname International: Host: Paramaribo, Suriname; Level: Future Series; Format: 32MS/16WS/16MD/16XD	(Suriname) Mitchel Wongsodikromo (Suriname) Virgil Soeroredjo	(Suriname) Oscar Brandon (Trinidad and Tobago) Raul Rampersad
November 16	Suriname International: Host: Paramaribo, Suriname; Level: Future Series; Format: 32MS/16WS/16MD/16XD	Score: 21–15, 21–16	
November 16	Suriname International: Host: Paramaribo, Suriname; Level: Future Series; Format: 32MS/16WS/16MD/16XD	(Suriname) Mitchel Wongsodikromo (Suriname) Priscila Tjitrodipo	(Suriname) Irfan Djabar (Suriname) Quennie Pawirosentono
November 16	Suriname International: Host: Paramaribo, Suriname; Level: Future Series; Format: 32MS/16WS/16MD/16XD	Score: 21–16, 21–15	
November 23	Korea International: Host: Hwasun County, South Korea; Level: International Challenge; Format: 64MS/32WS/32MD/32WD/32XD	(South Korea) Rho Ye-wook	(South Korea) Hwang Jong-soo
November 23	Korea International: Host: Hwasun County, South Korea; Level: International Challenge; Format: 64MS/32WS/32MD/32WD/32XD	Score: 14–21, 21–14, 21–14	
November 23	Korea International: Host: Hwasun County, South Korea; Level: International Challenge; Format: 64MS/32WS/32MD/32WD/32XD	(South Korea) Bae Yeon-ju	(South Korea) Lee Yun-hwa
November 23	Korea International: Host: Hwasun County, South Korea; Level: International Challenge; Format: 64MS/32WS/32MD/32WD/32XD	Score: 21–15, 21–18	
November 23	Korea International: Host: Hwasun County, South Korea; Level: International Challenge; Format: 64MS/32WS/32MD/32WD/32XD	(South Korea) Jung Jae-sung (South Korea) Lee Yong-dae	(South Korea) Ko Sung-hyun (South Korea) Yoo Yeon-seong
November 23	Korea International: Host: Hwasun County, South Korea; Level: International Challenge; Format: 64MS/32WS/32MD/32WD/32XD	Score: 21–19, 15–21, 21–15	
November 23	Korea International: Host: Hwasun County, South Korea; Level: International Challenge; Format: 64MS/32WS/32MD/32WD/32XD	(South Korea) Yoo Hyun-young (South Korea) Jung Kyung-eun	(South Korea) Ha Jung-eun (South Korea) Lee Kyung-won
November 23	Korea International: Host: Hwasun County, South Korea; Level: International Challenge; Format: 64MS/32WS/32MD/32WD/32XD	Score: 21–19, 21–10	
November 23	Korea International: Host: Hwasun County, South Korea; Level: International Challenge; Format: 64MS/32WS/32MD/32WD/32XD	(South Korea) Lee Yong-dae (South Korea) Lee Hyo-jung	(South Korea) Ko Sung-hyun (South Korea) Ha Jung-eun
November 23	Korea International: Host: Hwasun County, South Korea; Level: International Challenge; Format: 64MS/32WS/32MD/32WD/32XD	Score: 21–14, 15–21, 21–9	
November 23	Mexican International: Host: Mexico City, Mexico; Level: Future Series; Format: 32MS/32WS/16MD/16WD/16XD	(Guatemala) Kevin Cordón	(Jamaica) Charles Pyne
November 23	Mexican International: Host: Mexico City, Mexico; Level: Future Series; Format: 32MS/32WS/16MD/16WD/16XD	Score: 21–11, 21–13	
November 23	Mexican International: Host: Mexico City, Mexico; Level: Future Series; Format: 32MS/32WS/16MD/16WD/16XD	(United States) Karyn Velez	(Mexico) Victoria Montero
November 23	Mexican International: Host: Mexico City, Mexico; Level: Future Series; Format: 32MS/32WS/16MD/16WD/16XD	Score: 21–13, 12–21, 21–15	
November 23	Mexican International: Host: Mexico City, Mexico; Level: Future Series; Format: 32MS/32WS/16MD/16WD/16XD	(Mexico) José Luis González (Mexico) Andrés López	(United States) Mathew Fogarty (United States) David Neumann
November 23	Mexican International: Host: Mexico City, Mexico; Level: Future Series; Format: 32MS/32WS/16MD/16WD/16XD	Score: 21–18, 16–21, 21–14	
November 23	Mexican International: Host: Mexico City, Mexico; Level: Future Series; Format: 32MS/32WS/16MD/16WD/16XD	(Mexico) Victoria Montero (United States) Karyn Velez	(Mexico) Marisol Dominguez (Mexico) Naty Rangel
November 23	Mexican International: Host: Mexico City, Mexico; Level: Future Series; Format: 32MS/32WS/16MD/16WD/16XD	Score: 21–17, 24–26, 21–7	
November 23	Mexican International: Host: Mexico City, Mexico; Level: Future Series; Format: 32MS/32WS/16MD/16WD/16XD	(Mexico) José Luis González (Mexico) Naty Rangel	(Mexico) David Melo (Mexico) Victoria Montero
November 23	Mexican International: Host: Mexico City, Mexico; Level: Future Series; Format: 32MS/32WS/16MD/16WD/16XD	Score: 21–14, 21–19	
November 23	Welsh International: Host: Cardiff, Wales; Level: International Series; Format: 32MS/32WS/32MD/32WD/32XD	(Denmark) Kristian Nielsen	(Portugal) Pedro Martins
November 23	Welsh International: Host: Cardiff, Wales; Level: International Series; Format: 32MS/32WS/32MD/32WD/32XD	Score: 21–19, 12–21, 21–9	
November 23	Welsh International: Host: Cardiff, Wales; Level: International Series; Format: 32MS/32WS/32MD/32WD/32XD	(Russia) Tatjana Bibik	(Malaysia) Anita Raj Kaur
November 23	Welsh International: Host: Cardiff, Wales; Level: International Series; Format: 32MS/32WS/32MD/32WD/32XD	Score: 21–19, 15–21, 21–18	
November 23	Welsh International: Host: Cardiff, Wales; Level: International Series; Format: 32MS/32WS/32MD/32WD/32XD	(Russia) Vitalij Durkin (Russia) Aleksandr Nikolaenko	(Germany) Peter Käsbauer (Germany) Oliver Roth
November 23	Welsh International: Host: Cardiff, Wales; Level: International Series; Format: 32MS/32WS/32MD/32WD/32XD	Score: 21–18, 21–18	
November 23	Welsh International: Host: Cardiff, Wales; Level: International Series; Format: 32MS/32WS/32MD/32WD/32XD	(Russia) Valeria Sorokina (Russia) Nina Vislova	(Malaysia) Anita Raj Kaur (Malaysia) Joanne Quay
November 23	Welsh International: Host: Cardiff, Wales; Level: International Series; Format: 32MS/32WS/32MD/32WD/32XD	Score: 21–14, 21–16	
November 23	Welsh International: Host: Cardiff, Wales; Level: International Series; Format: 32MS/32WS/32MD/32WD/32XD	(Russia) Vitalij Durkin (Russia) Nina Vislova	(Russia) Aleksandr Nikolaenko (Russia) Valeria Sorokina
November 23	Welsh International: Host: Cardiff, Wales; Level: International Series; Format: 32MS/32WS/32MD/32WD/32XD	Score: 21–13, 21–13	

=== December ===
Week of	Tournament	Champions	Runners-up
December 1	Bahrain International: Host: Juffair, Bahrain; Level: International Series; Format: 64MS/16WS/32MD/8WD/16XD	(Iran) Ali Shahhosseini	(Iran) Mohammad Reza Kheradmandi
December 1	Bahrain International: Host: Juffair, Bahrain; Level: International Series; Format: 64MS/16WS/32MD/8WD/16XD	Score: 14–21, 21–14, 21–13	
December 1	Bahrain International: Host: Juffair, Bahrain; Level: International Series; Format: 64MS/16WS/32MD/8WD/16XD	(Indonesia) Putri Variella	(Iran) Nejat Zadeh Sahar Zamanian
December 1	Bahrain International: Host: Juffair, Bahrain; Level: International Series; Format: 64MS/16WS/32MD/8WD/16XD	Score: 21–12, 21–18	
December 1	Bahrain International: Host: Juffair, Bahrain; Level: International Series; Format: 64MS/16WS/32MD/8WD/16XD	(India) Aneesh Aneefa Kannangayath (India) Sanave Thomas	(Bahrain) Ebrahim Jaffer Al Sayed Jaffer (Bahrain) Heri Setiawan
December 1	Bahrain International: Host: Juffair, Bahrain; Level: International Series; Format: 64MS/16WS/32MD/8WD/16XD	Score: 21–16, 21–14	
December 1	Bahrain International: Host: Juffair, Bahrain; Level: International Series; Format: 64MS/16WS/32MD/8WD/16XD	(Iran) Negin Amiripour (Iran) Nejat Zadeh Sahar Zamanian	(Bahrain) Twina Bora (Indonesia) Putri Variella
December 1	Bahrain International: Host: Juffair, Bahrain; Level: International Series; Format: 64MS/16WS/32MD/8WD/16XD	Score: 21–10, 13–21, 21–15	
December 1	Bahrain International: Host: Juffair, Bahrain; Level: International Series; Format: 64MS/16WS/32MD/8WD/16XD	(Bahrain) Ebrahim Jaffer Al Sayed Jaffer (Indonesia) Putri Variella	(India) Jaison Xavier (India) Daya Elsa Jacob
December 1	Bahrain International: Host: Juffair, Bahrain; Level: International Series; Format: 64MS/16WS/32MD/8WD/16XD	Score: 12–21, 21–16, 21–15	
December 1	Super Series Masters Finals (Draw): Host: Johor Bahru, Malaysia; Level: Super Series Masters Finals; Format: 8MS (RR)/8WS (RR)/8MD (RR)/8WD (RR)/8XD (RR)	(Malaysia) Lee Chong Wei	(South Korea) Park Sung-hwan
December 1	Super Series Masters Finals (Draw): Host: Johor Bahru, Malaysia; Level: Super Series Masters Finals; Format: 8MS (RR)/8WS (RR)/8MD (RR)/8WD (RR)/8XD (RR)	Score: 21–17, 21–17	
December 1	Super Series Masters Finals (Draw): Host: Johor Bahru, Malaysia; Level: Super Series Masters Finals; Format: 8MS (RR)/8WS (RR)/8MD (RR)/8WD (RR)/8XD (RR)	(Malaysia) Wong Mew Choo	(Germany) Juliane Schenk
December 1	Super Series Masters Finals (Draw): Host: Johor Bahru, Malaysia; Level: Super Series Masters Finals; Format: 8MS (RR)/8WS (RR)/8MD (RR)/8WD (RR)/8XD (RR)	Score: 21–15, 21–7	
December 1	Super Series Masters Finals (Draw): Host: Johor Bahru, Malaysia; Level: Super Series Masters Finals; Format: 8MS (RR)/8WS (RR)/8MD (RR)/8WD (RR)/8XD (RR)	(South Korea) Jung Jae-sung (South Korea) Lee Yong-dae	(Denmark) Mathias Boe (Denmark) Carsten Mogensen
December 1	Super Series Masters Finals (Draw): Host: Johor Bahru, Malaysia; Level: Super Series Masters Finals; Format: 8MS (RR)/8WS (RR)/8MD (RR)/8WD (RR)/8XD (RR)	Score: 21–15, 21–15	
December 1	Super Series Masters Finals (Draw): Host: Johor Bahru, Malaysia; Level: Super Series Masters Finals; Format: 8MS (RR)/8WS (RR)/8MD (RR)/8WD (RR)/8XD (RR)	(Malaysia) Chin Eei Hui (Malaysia) Wong Pei Tty	(Denmark) Kamilla Rytter Juhl (Denmark) Lena Frier Kristiansen
December 1	Super Series Masters Finals (Draw): Host: Johor Bahru, Malaysia; Level: Super Series Masters Finals; Format: 8MS (RR)/8WS (RR)/8MD (RR)/8WD (RR)/8XD (RR)	Score: 21–17, 21–14	
December 1	Super Series Masters Finals (Draw): Host: Johor Bahru, Malaysia; Level: Super Series Masters Finals; Format: 8MS (RR)/8WS (RR)/8MD (RR)/8WD (RR)/8XD (RR)	(Denmark) Joachim Fischer Nielsen (Denmark) Christinna Pedersen	(India) Diju Valiyaveetil (India) Jwala Gutta
December 1	Super Series Masters Finals (Draw): Host: Johor Bahru, Malaysia; Level: Super Series Masters Finals; Format: 8MS (RR)/8WS (RR)/8MD (RR)/8WD (RR)/8XD (RR)	Score: 21–14, 21–18	
December 1	Irish International: Host: Dublin, Ireland; Level: International Challenge; Format: 32MS/32WS/32MD/32WD/32XD	(Sweden) Henri Hurskainen	(Denmark) Peter Mikkelsen
December 1	Irish International: Host: Dublin, Ireland; Level: International Challenge; Format: 32MS/32WS/32MD/32WD/32XD	Score: 21–15, 13–21, 21–17	
December 1	Irish International: Host: Dublin, Ireland; Level: International Challenge; Format: 32MS/32WS/32MD/32WD/32XD	(Spain) Carolina Marin	(Netherlands) Rachel Van Cutsen
December 1	Irish International: Host: Dublin, Ireland; Level: International Challenge; Format: 32MS/32WS/32MD/32WD/32XD	Score: 22–24, 21–14, 21–16	
December 1	Irish International: Host: Dublin, Ireland; Level: International Challenge; Format: 32MS/32WS/32MD/32WD/32XD	(Denmark) Mads Conrad-Petersen (Denmark) Mads Pieler Kolding	(England) Marcus Ellis (England) Peter Mills
December 1	Irish International: Host: Dublin, Ireland; Level: International Challenge; Format: 32MS/32WS/32MD/32WD/32XD	Score: 21–18, 21–11	
December 1	Irish International: Host: Dublin, Ireland; Level: International Challenge; Format: 32MS/32WS/32MD/32WD/32XD	(England) Mariana Agathangelou (England) Heather Olver	(Denmark) Maria Helsbol (Denmark) Anne Skelbaek
December 1	Irish International: Host: Dublin, Ireland; Level: International Challenge; Format: 32MS/32WS/32MD/32WD/32XD	Score: 21–13, 21–19	
December 1	Irish International: Host: Dublin, Ireland; Level: International Challenge; Format: 32MS/32WS/32MD/32WD/32XD	(Denmark) Mikkel Delbo Larsen (Denmark) Mie Schjott Kristensen	(England) Robin Middleton (England) Mariana Agathangelou
December 1	Irish International: Host: Dublin, Ireland; Level: International Challenge; Format: 32MS/32WS/32MD/32WD/32XD	Score: 21–16, 23–21	
December 7	East Asian Games (Draw): Host: Hong Kong; Level: Multisport event; Format: 6MT/6WT/16MS/16WS/16MD/16WD/16XD	China	South Korea
December 7	East Asian Games (Draw): Host: Hong Kong; Level: Multisport event; Format: 6MT/6WT/16MS/16WS/16MD/16WD/16XD	Score: 3–1	
December 7	East Asian Games (Draw): Host: Hong Kong; Level: Multisport event; Format: 6MT/6WT/16MS/16WS/16MD/16WD/16XD	China	Chinese Taipei
December 7	East Asian Games (Draw): Host: Hong Kong; Level: Multisport event; Format: 6MT/6WT/16MS/16WS/16MD/16WD/16XD	Score: 3–1	
December 7	East Asian Games (Draw): Host: Hong Kong; Level: Multisport event; Format: 6MT/6WT/16MS/16WS/16MD/16WD/16XD	(South Korea) Choi Ho-jin	(China) Lin Dan
December 7	East Asian Games (Draw): Host: Hong Kong; Level: Multisport event; Format: 6MT/6WT/16MS/16WS/16MD/16WD/16XD	Score: 21–19, 21–18	
December 7	East Asian Games (Draw): Host: Hong Kong; Level: Multisport event; Format: 6MT/6WT/16MS/16WS/16MD/16WD/16XD	(Hong Kong) Yip Pui Yin	(Hong Kong) Zhou Mi
December 7	East Asian Games (Draw): Host: Hong Kong; Level: Multisport event; Format: 6MT/6WT/16MS/16WS/16MD/16WD/16XD	Score: 15–21, 21–13, 17–10 Retired	
December 7	East Asian Games (Draw): Host: Hong Kong; Level: Multisport event; Format: 6MT/6WT/16MS/16WS/16MD/16WD/16XD	(Chinese Taipei) Hu Chung-hsien (Chinese Taipei) Tsai Chia-hsin	(Chinese Taipei) Chen Hung-ling (Chinese Taipei) Lin Yu-lang
December 7	East Asian Games (Draw): Host: Hong Kong; Level: Multisport event; Format: 6MT/6WT/16MS/16WS/16MD/16WD/16XD	Score: 21–17, 22–20	
December 7	East Asian Games (Draw): Host: Hong Kong; Level: Multisport event; Format: 6MT/6WT/16MS/16WS/16MD/16WD/16XD	(Macau) Zhang Dan (Macau) Zhang Zhibo	(China) Ma Jin (China) Wang Xiaoli
December 7	East Asian Games (Draw): Host: Hong Kong; Level: Multisport event; Format: 6MT/6WT/16MS/16WS/16MD/16WD/16XD	Score: 22–20, 21–16	
December 7	East Asian Games (Draw): Host: Hong Kong; Level: Multisport event; Format: 6MT/6WT/16MS/16WS/16MD/16WD/16XD	(China) Tao Jiaming (China) Zhang Yawen	(China) Zhang Nan (China) Ma Jin
December 7	East Asian Games (Draw): Host: Hong Kong; Level: Multisport event; Format: 6MT/6WT/16MS/16WS/16MD/16WD/16XD	Score: 21–15, 21–14	
December 14	India Open Grand Prix (Draw): Host: Lucknow, India; Level: Grand Prix; Format: 64MS/32WS/32MD/32WD/32XD	(India) Chetan Anand	(Indonesia) Dionysius Hayom Rumbaka
December 14	India Open Grand Prix (Draw): Host: Lucknow, India; Level: Grand Prix; Format: 64MS/32WS/32MD/32WD/32XD	Score: 21–17, 19–21, 21–16	
December 14	India Open Grand Prix (Draw): Host: Lucknow, India; Level: Grand Prix; Format: 64MS/32WS/32MD/32WD/32XD	(India) Saina Nehwal	(India) Aditi Mutatkar
December 14	India Open Grand Prix (Draw): Host: Lucknow, India; Level: Grand Prix; Format: 64MS/32WS/32MD/32WD/32XD	Score: 21–17, 21–13	
December 14	India Open Grand Prix (Draw): Host: Lucknow, India; Level: Grand Prix; Format: 64MS/32WS/32MD/32WD/32XD	(Indonesia) Fauzi Adnan (Indonesia) Trikusuma Wardhana	(India) Akshay Dewalkar (India) Jishnu Sanyal
December 14	India Open Grand Prix (Draw): Host: Lucknow, India; Level: Grand Prix; Format: 64MS/32WS/32MD/32WD/32XD	Score: 27–25, 23–25, 21–15	
December 14	India Open Grand Prix (Draw): Host: Lucknow, India; Level: Grand Prix; Format: 64MS/32WS/32MD/32WD/32XD	(Japan) Misaki Matsutomo (Japan) Ayaka Takahashi	(Indonesia) Nadya Melati (Indonesia) Devi Tika Permatasari
December 14	India Open Grand Prix (Draw): Host: Lucknow, India; Level: Grand Prix; Format: 64MS/32WS/32MD/32WD/32XD	Score: 21–14, 15–21, 21–15	
December 14	India Open Grand Prix (Draw): Host: Lucknow, India; Level: Grand Prix; Format: 64MS/32WS/32MD/32WD/32XD	(India) Arun Vishnu (India) Aparna Balan	(India) Tarun Kona (India) Shruti Kurien-Kanetkar
December 14	India Open Grand Prix (Draw): Host: Lucknow, India; Level: Grand Prix; Format: 64MS/32WS/32MD/32WD/32XD	Score: 21–14, 17–21, 21–19	
December 14	Turkiye International: Host: Istanbul, Turkey; Level: International Series; Format: 32MS/32WS/32MD/32WD/32XD	(Finland) Ville Lang	(Sweden) Henri Hurskainen
December 14	Turkiye International: Host: Istanbul, Turkey; Level: International Series; Format: 32MS/32WS/32MD/32WD/32XD	Score: 21–14, 21–23, 21–19	
December 14	Turkiye International: Host: Istanbul, Turkey; Level: International Series; Format: 32MS/32WS/32MD/32WD/32XD	(Turkey) Li Shuang	(Denmark) Anne Hald Jensen
December 14	Turkiye International: Host: Istanbul, Turkey; Level: International Series; Format: 32MS/32WS/32MD/32WD/32XD	Score: 21–14, 21–16	
December 14	Turkiye International: Host: Istanbul, Turkey; Level: International Series; Format: 32MS/32WS/32MD/32WD/32XD	(Sweden) Joel Johansson-Berg (Indonesia) Imam Sodikin	(Croatia) Zvonimir Durkinjak (Croatia) Zvonimir Hoelbling
December 14	Turkiye International: Host: Istanbul, Turkey; Level: International Series; Format: 32MS/32WS/32MD/32WD/32XD	Score: Walkover	
December 14	Turkiye International: Host: Istanbul, Turkey; Level: International Series; Format: 32MS/32WS/32MD/32WD/32XD	(Sweden) Emelie Lennartsson (Sweden) Emma Wengberg	(Turkey) Özge Bayrak (Turkey) Li Shuang
December 14	Turkiye International: Host: Istanbul, Turkey; Level: International Series; Format: 32MS/32WS/32MD/32WD/32XD	Score: 21–11, 21–9	
December 14	Turkiye International: Host: Istanbul, Turkey; Level: International Series; Format: 32MS/32WS/32MD/32WD/32XD	(Indonesia) Viki Indra Okvana (Indonesia) Gustiani Megawati	(Denmark) Tore Villhelmsen (Denmark) Sara Thygesen
December 14	Turkiye International: Host: Istanbul, Turkey; Level: International Series; Format: 32MS/32WS/32MD/32WD/32XD	Score: 21–11, 21–18	
December 28	Copenhagen Masters: Host: Frederiksberg, Copenhagen, Denmark; Level: Invitation tournament; Format: 6MS/4WS/4MD/4XD	(Denmark) Jan Ø. Jørgensen	(Netherlands) Dicky Palyama
December 28	Copenhagen Masters: Host: Frederiksberg, Copenhagen, Denmark; Level: Invitation tournament; Format: 6MS/4WS/4MD/4XD	Score: 21–7, 21–14	
December 28	Copenhagen Masters: Host: Frederiksberg, Copenhagen, Denmark; Level: Invitation tournament; Format: 6MS/4WS/4MD/4XD	(Denmark) Tine Rasmussen	(Malaysia) Lydia Cheah
December 28	Copenhagen Masters: Host: Frederiksberg, Copenhagen, Denmark; Level: Invitation tournament; Format: 6MS/4WS/4MD/4XD	Score: 21–11, 18–21, 21–10	
December 28	Copenhagen Masters: Host: Frederiksberg, Copenhagen, Denmark; Level: Invitation tournament; Format: 6MS/4WS/4MD/4XD	(Denmark) Lars Paaske (Denmark) Jonas Rasmussen	(Denmark) Mathias Boe (Denmark) Carsten Mogensen
December 28	Copenhagen Masters: Host: Frederiksberg, Copenhagen, Denmark; Level: Invitation tournament; Format: 6MS/4WS/4MD/4XD	Score: 21–16, 22–20	
December 28	Copenhagen Masters: Host: Frederiksberg, Copenhagen, Denmark; Level: Invitation tournament; Format: 6MS/4WS/4MD/4XD	(Denmark) Thomas Laybourn (Denmark) Kamilla Rytter Juhl	(Poland) Robert Mateusiak (Poland) Nadieżda Kostiuczyk
December 28	Copenhagen Masters: Host: Frederiksberg, Copenhagen, Denmark; Level: Invitation tournament; Format: 6MS/4WS/4MD/4XD	Score: Walkover	
