= Surinamese National Junior Badminton Championships =

Surinamese National Junior Badminton Championships is a yearly organized event by the Surinaamse Badminton Bond (SBB) the governing body for the sport of badminton in Suriname, to crown the best National badminton junior players in Suriname. It was locally called the "Open Jeugdkampioenschappen van Suriname".

The tournament started in 1968 and is held every year, except for the years 1971 and 1989 when no National championships were held. Since the year 1996 the National Championships of Suriname is divided between the different age categories for junior players Under-19 (U-19) years, Under 17 (U-17) years, Under 15 (U-15) years and Under 13 (U-13) years. In 2001 the Under 11 (U-11) age category was added. Furthermore a National Championships for adults is also organized every year since 1966. There also used to be yearly Surinamese National Badminton Club Championships for club teams held since 1964.

== Title holders National Championships U-19 (was some years U-18 till 1996) ==
Season	Boys' Singles	Girls' Singles	Boys' Doubles	Girls' Doubles	Mixed Doubles
1968	Jeffrey Haselhoef	Lilian Abendanon	Henri Dijk / Frits Terborg	Diana Pengel / Hildegaard Illes	Henri Dijk / Gerda Lobato de Mesquita
1969			Reginald Chin Jong /		
1970	Steven Stjeward	Sandra Apon	Reginald Chin Jong /		Reginald Chin Jong / Sandra Apon
1972					
1973					
1974					
1975	Howard Stewart	Sandra Apon	Alvin Cheung / Frankie Lieuw	Sandra Apon / Suzy Tjin A Sjoe	Frankie Lieuw / Sandra Apon
1976			Alvin Cheung / Frankie Lieuw	Kathleen Burke /	/ Kathleen Burke
1977	Jimmy Snabelië		Alvin Cheung / Frankie Lieuw	M. Adhin / M. Abas	Jimmy Snabelië /
1978	Armand Vliet				Armand Vliet / Ivy Wongsodimedjo
1979	Mike van Daal	Ivy Wongsodimedjo	Mike van Daal / Armand Vliet	Olivia Wijntuin / Ivy Wongsodimedjo	Mike van Daal / Sherita Breidel
1980	not held	not held	not held	not held	not held
1981		Sherida Ramzan		Sherida Ramzan /	
1982	Steeve Nobibux	Sherida Ramzan		Sherida Ramzan /	
1983		Sherida Ramzan		Sherida Ramzan /	
1984	Hedwig de La Fuente	Joan Jong Pian Kie	Eric Bleau / Fariek Nazir	Carmen Partoredjo / Joan Jong Pian Kie	Hedwig de La Fuente /
1985				Audrey Pawironadi / Mireille Pawironadi	Steeve Nobibux / Audrey Pawironadi
1986	Oscar Brandon		Oscar Brandon /		
1987					
1988	Oscar Brandon	Letitia Wongsodimedjo	Eric Bleau / Fariek Nazir	Letitia Wongsodimedjo / Ninon Nojodipo	Eric Bleau / Ninon Nojodipo
1990	Clint Fazal-Alikhan	Letitia Wongsodimedjo	Clint Fazal-Alikhan / Harvey Kasanwidjojo	not held	Clint Fazal-Alikhan / Letitia Wongsodimedjo
1991	Misdi Soerodimedjo	Sharon Carrilho	Jerrel Burleson / Ryan Samidin	Sharon Carrilho / Melinda Buiteman	Jerrel Burleson / Sharon Carrilho
1992					
1993					
1994					
1995					
1996		Nathalie Haynes			
1997	Brian Kliwon	Nathalie Haynes	Raul Neijhorst /	Nathalie Haynes /	Raul Neijhorst / Nathalie Haynes
1998	Mitchel Wongsodikromo	Nathalie Haynes	Mitchel Wongsodikromo / Brian Kliwon	Nathalie Haynes / Charlene Soerodimedjo	Virgil Soeroredjo / Nathalie Haynes
1999	Mitchel Wongsodikromo	Daniëlle Melchiot	Mitchel Wongsodikromo / Virgil Soeroredjo		Mitchel Wongsodikromo / Carolyn Davids
2000	Mitchel Wongsodikromo	Daniëlle Melchiot	Virgil Soeroredjo / Redon Coulor	Nathalie Haynes / Daniëlle Melchiot	Mitchel Wongsodikromo / Carolyn Davids
2001	Mitchel Wongsodikromo	Carolyn Davids	Virgil Soeroredjo / Redon Coulor	Carolyn Davids / Priscille Tjitrodipo	Mitchel Wongsodikromo / Carolyn Davids
2002	Mitchel Wongsodikromo	Sefania Esajas	Mitchel Wongsodikromo / Dion Sjauw Mook	Sefania Esajas / Stephanie Jadi	Virgil Soeroredjo / Stephanie Jadi
2003	Mitchel Wongsodikromo	Carolyn Davids	Mitchel Wongsodikromo / Virgil Soeroredjo		
2004	Gilmar Jones	Carolyn Davids	Gilmar Jones / Danny Liu		Gilmar Jones / Gaelle Jones
2005		Jill Sjauw Mook	Irfan Djabar /	Jill Sjauw Mook / Gaelle Jones	Irfan Djabar / Gaelle Jones
2006	Irfan Djabar	Jill Sjauw Mook	Dwayne Heath / Romario Mamatoe	Jill Sjauw Mook /	/ Jill Sjauw Mook
2007	Dylan Darmohoetomo	Crystal Leefmans	Irfan Djabar / Dwayne Heath	Crystal Leefmans / Arantxa Ilahibaks	Irfan Djabar / Quennie Pawirosentono
2008	Irfan Djabar	Quennie Pawirosentono	Dylan Darmohoetomo / Irfan Djabar	Ushafe Djarkasi / Rugshaar Ishaak	Irfan Djabar / Quennie Pawirosentono
2009	Irfan Djabar	Crystal Leefmans	Dylan Darmohoetomo / Irfan Djabar	Crystal Leefmans / Quennie Pawirosemito	Irfan Djabar / Quennie Pawirosemito
2010	Irfan Djabar	Crystal Leefmans			Irfan Djabar / Quennie Pawirosomito
2011	Sören Opti	Crystal Leefmans	Sören Opti / Jair Liew	Crystal Leefmans / Sherifa Jameson	Alrick Toney / Crystal Leefmans
2012	Sören Opti	Crystal Leefmans	Sören Opti / Alrick Toney	Sherifa Jameson / Crystal Leefmans	Sören Opti / Rugshaar Ishaak
2013	Sören Opti	Rugshaar Ishaak	Sören Opti / Mitch Nai Chung Tong	Rugshaar Ishaak / Santusha Ramzan	Sören Opti / Rugshaar Ishaak
2014	Sören Opti	Rugshaar Ishaak	Sören Opti / Mitch Nai Chung Tong	Rugshaar Ishaak / Santusha Ramzan	Sören Opti / Rugshaar Ishaak
2015	Sören Opti	Shemara Lindveld	Sören Opti / Mitch Nai Chung Tong	Shemara Lindveld / Santusha Ramzan	Sören Opti / Santusha Ramzan
2016	Danny Chen	Santusha Ramzan	Juan Delprado / Denzel Sweet		Denzel Sweet / Caroline Jameson
2017	Danny Chen	Shemara Lindveld	Jascha Atmodikromo / Danny Chen	Imani Mangroe / Mary-Ann Zhong	Tariq Sweet / Shemara Lindveld
2018	Danny Chen	Imani Mangroe	Geordan Tjon Kon Joen / Eric Wu	Imani Mangroe / Faith Sariman	Danny Chen / Isabella Li
2019	David Cheung	Imani Mangroe	Jason Chen / Kevin Karg	Erisa Bleau / Sion Zeegelaar	Kevin Karg / Erisa Bleau
2020	National Junior Championships not held due to COVID-19 pandemic				
2021	National Junior Championships not held due to COVID-19 pandemic				
2022	Quinn van de Leuv	Sion Zegelaar	Diego dos Ramos / Al-Hassan Somedjo	not held	Rivano Bisphan / Sion Zegelaar
2023	Rivano Bisphan	Sion Zegelaar	Diego dos Ramos / Al-Hassan Somedjo	Jade Asmoredjo / Sion Zegelaar	Rivano Bisphan / Sion Zegelaar
2024	Dickson Liao	Le Yan Sharon Li	Dickson Liao / Yu Rui Tony Zhu	not held	Daniel Li / Chantal Huang
2025					

== Title holders National Championships U-17 (was some years U-16 till 1996) ==
Season	Boys' Singles	Girls' Singles	Boys' Doubles	Girls' Doubles	Mixed Doubles
1975	Orlando Kenton				
1976	Amernath Jhinkoerai	Kathleen Burke			
1977	Amernath Jhinkoerai	Ivy Wongsodimedjo	Amernath Jhinkoerai /	Ivy Wongsodimedjo /	Amernath Jhinkoerai / Ivy Wongsodimedjo
1978	Mike van Daal		Mike van Daal / Armand Vliet		Mike van Daal / Anne Watkin
1979	Mike van Daal		Mike van Daal / Howard Breidel	/	Mike van Daal / Anne Watkin
1980					
1981					
1982					
1983		Donna Amatkarijo			
1984	Fayaz Nazir	Audrey Pawironadi		Donna Amatkarijo /	Fayaz Nazir / Donna Amatkarijo
1985	Oscar Brandon	Letitia Wongsodimedjo	Oscar Brandon / Marlon Djojodiwongso		/ Audrey Pawironadi
1986	Oscar Brandon	Letitia Wongsodimedjo	Oscar Brandon /		
1988	Clint Fazal-Alikhan	Thalitia Sjauw Mook	Clint Fazal-Alikhan / Harvey Kasanwidjojo	Letitia Wongsodimedjo / Thalitia Sjauw Mook	Clint Fazal-Alikhan / Natalia Carrilho
1990	Misdi Soerodimedjo	not held	Misdi Soerodimedjo / Junaedhy "Juny" Samidin	not held	not held
1991	Junaedhy "Juny" Samidin	Revelya Wongsodimedjo	Terry Kastoredjo / Wensley Sarip	Sharon Sandjon / Audrey Hankers	Michael Harkisoen / Priscilla Ngalimoertomo
1992					
1993					Winston Sanijo /
1994		Nathalie Haynes			
1995	Sergio Gesrooh	Nathalie Haynes			Eduard Ramjiawan / Shiva Schillevoort
1996					
1997	Mitchel Wongsodikromo	Nathalie Haynes	Mitchel Wongsodikromo /	Nathalie Haynes /	Raul Neijhorst / Nathalie Haynes
1998	This age group not held this year	This age group not held this year	This age group not held this year	This age group not held this year	This age group not held this year
1999		Carolyn Davids		Carolyn Davids / Cheryl Blokland	Mitchel Wongsodikromo / Carolyn Davids
2000	Amilcar Cooman				
2001	Gilmar Jones	Sefania Esajas	Gilmar Jones / Danny Liu	Sefania Esajas / Janet de Freitas	Gilmar Jones / Sefania Esajas
2002	Gilmar Jones	Jill Sjauw Mook	Gilmar Jones / Dino Kappel	Jill Sjauw Mook / Xavira Jons	Dion Sjauw Mook/ Jill Sjauw Mook
2003					
2004	Irfan Djabar				
2005	Dwayne Heath				
2006					
2007	Irfan Djabar	Ushafe Djarkasi	Irfan Djabar / Jair Liew	Crystal Leefmans / Arantxa Ilahibaks	Dylan Darmohoetomo / Sharon Rakijo
2008	Irfan Djabar	Ushafe Djarkasi	Irfan Djabar / Jair Liew	Cheryl Nai Chung Tong / Preciosa Veerhuizen	Dylan Darmohoetomo / Sharon Rakijo
2009					
2010					
2011	Sören Opti	Santusha Ramzan	Mitch Nai Chung Tong / Sören Opti	Nazia Kurban / Santusha Ramzan	Alrick Toney / Nazia Kurban
2012	Sören Opti	Rugshaar Ishaak	Mitch Nai Chung Tong / Sören Opti	Rugshaar Ishaak / Santusha Ramzan	Sören Opti / Rugshaar Ishaak
2013	Sören Opti	Santusha Ramzan	Mitch Nai Chung Tong / Sören Opti	Caroline Jameson / Shemara Lindveld	Sören Opti / Santusha Ramzan
2014	Denzel Sweet	Santusha Ramzan	Denzel Sweet / Tariq Sweet	Caroline Jameson / Shemara Lindveld	Denzel Sweet / Shemara Lindveld
2015	Tariq Sweet	Shemara Lindveld	Jia Luo / Eric Wu	Imani Mangroe / Mary-Ann Zhong	Juan Delprado / Mary-Ann Zhong
2016	Jascha Atmodikromo	Imani Mangroe	Jascha Atmodikromo / Danny Chen	Abigael Hing / Faith Sariman	Jascha Atmodikromo / Imani Mangroe
2017	Danny Chen	Imani Mangroe	Jair Naipal / Geordan Tjon Kon Joen	Imani Mangroe / Vivian Huang	Kevin Karg / Imani Mangroe
2018	Danny Chen	Chaista Soemodipoero	Jason Chen / Kevin Karg	Chaista Soemodipoero / Erisa Bleau	Danny Chen / Isabella Li
2019	Kevin Karg	Vivian Huang	Kevin Karg / Timothy Karg	Erisa Bleau / Sion Zeegelaar	Kevin Karg / Erisa Bleau
2020	National Junior Championships not held due to COVID-19 pandemic				
2021	National Junior Championships not held due to COVID-19 pandemic				
2022	Yu Rui Tony Zhu	Melody Sjauw Koen Fa	Dickson Liao / Yu Rui Tony Zhu	Chantal Huang / Melody Sjauw Koen Fa	Yu Rui Tony Zhu / Melody Sjauw Koen Fa
2023	Dickson Liao	Megan Peng	Daniel Li / Dickson Liao	not held	Yu Rui Tony Zhu / Jade Asmoredjo
2024					
2025					

== Title holders National Championships U-15 (was some years U-14 till 1996) ==
Season	Boys' Singles	Girls' Singles	Boys' Doubles	Girls' Doubles	Mixed Doubles
1991	Marvin Amatoeloes	Myrre Babb	Marvin Amatoeloes / Romano Nejal		Winston Sanijo / Priscilla Ngalimoertomo
1992			Derrick Stjeward / Marvin Amatoeloes		
1993			Sergio Gesrooh / Eduard Ramjiawan		
1994		Nathalie Haynes	Mitchel Wongsodikromo /		Mitchel Wongsodikromo /
1995	Mitchel Wongsodikromo	Nathalie Haynes	Mitchel Wongsodikromo /	Nathalie Haynes	Mitchel Wongsodikromo / Nathalie Haynes
1996	Mitchel Wongsodikromo	Carolyn Davids	Mitchel Wongsodikromo /		Mitchel Wongsodikromo /
1997		Carolyn Davids	Mitchel Wongsodikromo /		
1998	Mitchel Wongsodikromo	Pricille Tjitrodipo	Virgil Soeroredjo / Danny Liu	Pricille Tjitrodipo / Stephanie Jadi	Mitchel Wongsodikromo / Pricille Tjitrodipo
1999	Mitchel Wongsodikromo	Sefanja Esajas	Virgil Soeroredjo / Gilmar Jones	Priscille Tjitrodipo / Stephanie Jadi	Mitchel Wongsodikromo / Priscille Tjitrodipo
2000	Gilmar Jones	Priscille Tjitrodipo	Gilmar Jones / Danny Liu	Priscille Tjitrodipo / Jill Sjauw Mook	Gilmar Jones / Priscille Tjitrodipo
2001	Dino Kappel	Jill Sjauw Mook	Ryan van Russel / Jimmy Jong A Pin	Jill Sjauw Mook / Xavira Jons	Dino Kappel / Janet de Freitas
2002	Randy Wakiran	Jill Sjauw Mook	Randy Wakiran / Harvey Salijo	Jill Sjauw Mook / Xavira Jons	Randy Wakiran / Maroushka van der Claus
2003					
2004	Irfan Djabar	Gaelle Jones	Irfan Djabar / Quin Lie A Fat	Ushafe Djarkasi / Lilièn Tjioe	
2005	Irfan Djabar	Ushafe Djarkasi	Irfan Djabar /	Ushafe Djarkasi / Quennie Pawirosemito	Irfan Djabar / Ushafe Djarkasi
2006					/ Quennie Pawirosemito
2007	Jair Liew	Crystal Leefmans	Jair Liew / Sören Opti	Crystal Leefmans / Arantxa Ilahibaks	Jair Liew / Crystal Leefmans
2008	Jair Liew	Rugshaar Ishaak	Jair Liew / Sören Opti	Rugshaar Ishaak / Crystal Leefmans	Jair Liew / Crystal Leefmans
2009	Sören Opti	Crystal Leefmans	Sören Opti / Alrick Toney	Rugshaar Ishaak / Crystal Leefmans	Sören Opti / Crystal Leefmans
2010	Sören Opti	Rugshaar Ishaak			Sören Opti / Rugshaar Ishaak
2011	Sören Opti	Santusha Ramzan	Sören Opti / Mitch Nai Chung Tong	Santusha Ramzan / Shemara Lindveld	Sören Opti / Santusha Ramzan
2012	Mitch Nai Chung Tong	Santusha Ramzan	Juan Delprado / Mitch Nai Chung Tong	Santusha Ramzan / Shemara Lindveld	Mitch Nai Chung Tong / Santusha Ramzan
2013	Arvind Nannanpanday	Shemara Lindveld	Jascha Atmodikromo / Mitch Wong A Foe	Caroline Jameson / Shemara Lindveld	Tariq Sweet / Shemara Lindveld
2014	Tariq Sweet	Shemara Lindveld	Danny Chen / Eric Wu	Stacy Cheung / Shemara Lindveld	Tariq Sweet / Shemara Lindveld
2015	Manish Nannanpanday	Imani Mangroe	Danny Chen / David Cheung	Abigael Hing / Joy Yzer	David Cheung / Faith Sariman
2016	Danny Chen	Abigael Hing	Kevin Karg / Jair Naipal	Kayleigh Moenne / Chaista Soemodipoero	Kevin Karg / Abigael Hing
2017	Kevin Karg	Erisa Bleau	Kevin Karg / Jason Chen	Erisa Bleau / Vivian Huang	Kevin Karg / Erisa Bleau
2018	Rivano Bisphan	Vivian Huang	Rivano Bisphan / Timothy Karg	Chloe Poeketie / Sion Zeegelaar	Rivano Bisphan / Sion Zeegelaar
2019	Al-Hassan Somedjo	Sion Zeegelaar	Zair Amatkarijo / Al-Hassan Somedjo	Chloe Poeketie / Sion Zeegelaar	Quinn Van De Leuv / Chloe Poeketie
2020	National Junior Championships not held due to COVID-19 pandemic				
2021	National Junior Championships not held due to COVID-19 pandemic				
2022	Wilson Huang	Jade Asmoredjo	Wilson Huang / Terence Li	Le Yan Sharon Li / Jade Asmoredjo	Daniel Li / Le Yan Sharon Li
2023	Joshua Lan	Megan Peng	Joshua Lan / Terence Li	Megan Peng / Elise Wu	Joshua Lan / Megan Peng
2024	Ruiz Lieuw-A-Joe	Riana Wijngaarde	Ruiz Lieuw-A-Joe / Zane Setrowidjojo	Hanna-Christa Emanuels / Riana Wijngaarde	Ruiz Lieuw-A-Joe / Riana Wijngaarde
2025					

== Title holders National Championships U-13 (was some years U-12 till 1996) ==
Season	Boys' Singles	Girls' Singles	Boys' Doubles	Girls' Doubles	Mixed Doubles
1975			Hedwig de La Fuente / Loepi Caster		
1977	Hedwig de La Fuente	D. Jong Tjien Fa		D. Jong Tjien Fa /	/ D. Jong Tjien Fa
1988	Terry Kastoredjo	not held	Terry Kastoredjo / Wesley Sarip	not held	not held
1991	Clyde Fernandes	Byanthie Djoewan	not held	Byanthie Djoewan / Shiva Schillevoort	not held
1993	Mitchel Wongsodikromo		Mitchel Wongsodikromo /		
1994	Mitchel Wongsodikromo				Mitchel Wongsodikromo /
1995	Mitchel Wongsodikromo	Cheryl Blokland	Mitchel Wongsodikromo /		Mitchel Wongsodikromo /
1996	Mitchel Wongsodikromo		Mitchel Wongsodikromo /		Mitchel Wongsodikromo /
1997	Mitchel Wongsodikromo				Virgil Soeroredjo /
1998	This age group not held this year	This age group not held this year	This age group not held this year	This age group not held this year	This age group not held this year
1999					
2000	Angelo Wouter	Jill Sjauw Mook	Angelo Wouter / Eldridge Tholel	Jill Sjauw Mook / Xavira Jons	Andreas Amatkarijo / Jill Sjauw Mook
2001	Romario Mamatoe	Xavira Jons	Romario Mamatoe / Dwayne Heath	Xavira Jons / Michelle Tjoen A Choy	Dylan Darmohoetomo / Xavira Jons
2002	Irfan Djabar	Gaella Jones	Irfan Djabar / Dylan Darmohoetomo	Gaella Jones / Preciosa Veerhuissen	Quin Lie A Fat / Ushafe Djarkasi
2003					
2004	Irfan Djabar	Ushafe Djarkasi	Irfan Djabar / Quin Lie A Fat	Ushafe Djarkasi / Sharon Rakijo	Quin Lie A Fat / Ushafe Djarkasi
2005				Arantxa Ilahibaks/	Jair Liew / Arantxa Ilahibaks
2006					
2007	Sören Opti	Crystal Leefmans	Sören Opti / Mitch Nai Chung Tong	Crystal Leefmans / Rugshaar Ishaak	Sören Opti / Crystal Leefmans
2008	Sören Opti	Rugshaar Ishaak	Sören Opti / Mitch Nai Chung Tong	Rugshaar Ishaak / Santusha Ramzan	Sören Opti / Rugshaar Ishaak
2009					
2010					
2011	Juan Delprado	Caroline Jameson	Juan Delprado / Arvind Nannanpanday	Caroline Jameson / Iraisa Ramnandanlal	Juan Delprado / Caroline Jameson
2012	Sjarief Djabar	Shemara Lindveld	Jascha Atmodikromo / Damien Kort	Shemara Lindveld / Nazeeya Oemar	Jascha Atmodikromo / Erisa Bleau
2013	Danny Chen	Stacy Cheung	Danny Chen / Damien Kort	Stacy Cheung / Imani Mangroe	Danny Chen / Stacy Cheung
2014	Danny Chen	Erisa Bleau	Jason Chen / Jair Naipal	Erisa Bleau / Faith Sariman	Jason Chen / Erisa Bleau
2015	Jason Chen	Erisa Bleau	Jason Chen / Kevin Karg	Vivian Huang / Lichelle Yeung	Jason Chen / Erisa Bleau
2016	Rivano Bisphan	Vivian Huang	Rivano Bisphan / Timothy Karg	Igwensa Mateda / Peresa Todie	Rivano Bisphan / Sion Zeegelaar
2017	Rivano Bisphan	Sion Zeegelaar	Rivano Bisphan / Al-Hassan Somedjo	Chloe Poeketie / Sion Zeegelaar	Rivano Bisphan / Sion Zeegelaar
2018	Angelo Chen	Melody Sjauw Koen Fa	Angelo Chen / Stanley Wu	Melody Sjauw Koen Fa / Miracle Abdillah	Angelo Chen / Melody Sjauw Koen Fa
2019	Dickson Liao	Le Yan Sharon Li	Dickson Liao / Jia Le Kevin Fang	Le Yan Sharon Li / Sheryl Liu	Dickson Liao / Le Yan Sharon Li
2020	National Junior Championships not held due to COVID-19 pandemic				
2021	National Junior Championships not held due to COVID-19 pandemic				
2022	Hilton Li	Elise Wu	Ruiz Lieuw A Joe / Nathan Zhong	Elise Wu / Giselle Wu	Hilton Li / Elise Wu
2023	Jezreёl Pick	Hanna-Christa Emanuels	Jezreёl Pick / Damian Ramkissoon	Faith Comvalius / Hanna-Christa Emanuels	Jezreёl Pick / Hanna-Christa Emanuels
2024					
2025					

== Title holders National Championships U-11 ==
Season	Boys' Singles	Girls' Singles	Boys' Doubles	Girls' Doubles	Mixed Doubles
2001	Romario Mamatoe				
2002	Irfan Djabar	Ushafe Djarkasi	Irfan Djabar / Dylan Darmohoetomo	Ushafe Djarkasi / Tanija Wakiran	Quin Lie A Fat / Ushafe Djarkasi
2003					
2004	Jair Liew	Crystal Leefmans	Jair Liew / Sören Opti	Crystal Leefmans / Tanya Wakiran	Gideon van der Jagt / Crystal Leefmans
2005	Sören Opti	Crystal Leefmans	Sören Opti /	Crystal Leefmans /	Sören Opti / Crystal Leefmans
2006					
2007	Mitch Nai Chung Tong	Santusha Ramzan	Mitch Nai Chung Tong / Shawn Brandon	Shveta Nannan Panday / Simran Pritemani	Faustino Struiken / Santusha Ramzan
2008	Mitch Nai Chung Tong	Santusha Ramzan	Mitch Nai Chung Tong / Shawn Brandon	Santusha Ramzan / Daphne Wong A Foe	Mitch Nai Chung Tong / Santusha Ramzan
2009	Juan Del Prado	Caroline Jameson	Juan Del Prado / Sjarief Djabar	Caroline Jameson / Charien Vervuurt	Juan Del Prado / Caroline Jameson
2010	Sjarief Djabar	Shemara Lindveld			Sjarief Djabar / Iraisa Ramnandanlal
2011	Manish Nannanpanday	Nazeeya Oemar	Danny Chen / Damien Kort	Erisa Bleau / Stacey Cheung	Damien Kort / Erisa Bleau
2012	Danny Chen	Erisa Bleau	Danny Chen / David Cheung	Erisa Bleau / Faith Sariman	Danny Chen / Erisa Bleau
2013	Jason Chen	Erisa Bleau	Jason Chen / Troy Kort	Erisa Bleau / Fauroez Lindveld	Jason Chen / Erisa Bleau
2014	Timothy Karg	Vivian Huang	Rivano Bisphan / Timothy Karg	Vivian Huang / Lana-Sue Landburg	Angelo Chen / Vivian Huang
2015	Rivano Bisphan	Sion Zeegelaar	Zair Amatkarijo / Al-Hassan Somedjo	Chante Koswal / Sion Zeegelaar	Rivano Bisphan / Sion Zeegelaar
2016	Angelo Chen	Miracle Abdillah	Angelo Chen / Stanley Wu	Miracle Abdillah / Sheetal Autar	Angelo Chen / Melody Sjauw Koen Fa
2017	Dickson Liao	Sheryl Ramdaras	Dickson Liao / Sean Li	Siara Bleau / Xue-Wen Fung	Dickson Liao / Sheryl Ramdaras
2018	Jeric Van Der Leuv	Le Yan Sharon Li	Jeric van der Leuv / Terence Huang	not held	Jeric van der Leuv / Gillian Jones
2019	Terrence Li	Elise Wu	Shaquille Somedjo / Nathan Zhong	Elise Wu / Kirsten Rais	Joshua Lan / Elise Wu
2020	National Junior Championships not held due to COVID-19 pandemic				
2021	National Junior Championships not held due to COVID-19 pandemic				
2022	Damien Ramkissoon	C'Ayra Kromosoeto	Ayden Lee / Roche Ramlal	Kaithlyn de Vries / C'Ayra Kromosoeto	Damien Ramkissoon / C'Ayra Kromosoeto
2023	Jeremi Fraser	Chayenne Ramlal	not held	Lindsey Schmeltz / Miley Schmeltz	not held
2024	Jeremi Fraser	La-Fay Stenhuijs	Joshua Fernandes / Issey Samiran	Miley Schmeltz / La-Fay Stenhuijs	Jeremi Fraser / La-Fay Stenhuijs
2025					
