= Dylan Darmohoetomo =

Surinamese badminton player

Personal information
- Born: 22 December 1992 (age 33) Nieuw Nickerie, Suriname

Sport
- Country: Suriname
- Sport: Badminton
- Handedness: Left

Men's singles & doubles
- Highest ranking: 306 (MS 28 May 2015); 190 (MD 13 September 2012); 216 (XD 1 December 2011)
- Current ranking: 548 (MS), 344 (MD), 299 (XD) (6 September 2018)
- BWF profile

Dylan Darmohoetomo (born 22 December 1992) is a Surinamese badminton player and coach. He is a member of the Surinamese badminton club Perfect Flying Feathers (P.F.F.). He was the flagbearer for Suriname at the 2019 Pan Am Games

== Career ==
Already in 2001 Dylan won the National junior Mixed Doubles title followed in 2002 by the National Boys Doubles U-11 & U-13 titles. Many more junior titles followed in the years there after. Most of his Boys Doubles junior titles were with his friend and long time doubles partner Irfan Djabar. In 2007 Dylan became the National U-19 Boys Singles champion of Suriname. Dylan took the Pan Am Juniors 2009 Bronze medal Boys Doubles U-19. He won a silver medal as runner-up at the South American Juniors Championships 2010 in the U-19 category in Teresina, Brazil. Also taking two gold medals at the same event winning both the Boys Doubles U-19 with Irfan Djabar and the Mixed Doubles U-19 with Arantxa Ilahibaks. Dylan was the "Most Promising Badminton Junior Player in 2010" from Suriname.

Dylan won his first adult National title in Suriname in 2010 in Mixed Doubles with Crystal Leefmans. It took five years before he won another National title. This time in 2015 it even was a triple championship winning in Men's Singles, Men's Doubles and Mixed Doubles. He won the National Men's doubles title again in 2017 with doubles partner Gilmar Jones.

Dylan participated for Suriname at the 2014 CACSO Games in Veracruz, Mexico and also at three consecutive Pan Am Games, the 2011 Pan Am Games in Guadalajara, Mexico, the 2015 Pan Am Games in Toronto, Ontario, Canada and also the 2019 Pan Am Games in Lima, Peru. In 2013 Dylan participated at the 2013 Summer Universiade in Kazan, Russia. where he lost against Michał Rogalski from Poland (12–21, 13–21). In 2017 Dylan participated in the 2017 Summer Universiade in Taipei, Taiwan, where he managed to win two rounds against Mark Banda from Zambia and Shailesh Dahal from Nepal, before losing to Daniel Fan from Australia with 15–21, 17–21 in the round of 32 of the Men's Singles event.

His biggest international achievements to date are winning the Caribbean Carebaco International title at home in Mixed Doubles with Crystal Leefmans in 2018 and winning the Men's Doubles with Gilmar Jones in 2016 at the Carebaco International in Aruba. Dylan Darmohoetomo previously reached the semi-finals in the men's doubles category at the 2012 Carebaco International at Santo Domingo with his former doubles partner Irfan Djabar.

Dylan followed the coach level 1 & 2 Course in Kingston, Jamaica in January 2019. Dylan completed his coach level 3 course when this BWF Coach Level 3 Continental Pilot Course was held in Lima, Peru in November 2019.

== Achievements ==
=== BWF International Challenge/Series ===
Men's doubles
Year	Tournament	Partner	Opponent	Score	Result
2018	Carebaco International	(Suriname) Gilmar Jones	(Barbados) Dakeil Thorpe (Barbados) Shae Michael Martin	19–21, 21–18, 16–21	(silver) Runner-up
2016	Carebaco International	(Suriname) Gilmar Jones	(Dominican Republic) Therry Aquino (Dominican Republic) Reimi Starling Cabrera Rosario	21–18, 21–15	(gold) Winner
2012	Suriname International	(Suriname) Irfan Djabar	(Guatemala) Humblers Heymard (Guatemala) Anibal Marroquin	11–21, 16–21	(silver) Runner-up
2008	Suriname International	(Suriname) Irfan Djabar	(Suriname) Mitchel Wongsodikromo (Suriname) Virgil Soeroredjo	15–21, 15–21	(silver) Runner-up

Mixed doubles
Year	Tournament	Partner	Opponent	Score	Result
2018	Carebaco International	(Suriname) Crystal Leefmans	(Barbados) Dakeil Thorpe (Barbados) Tamisha Williams	22–20, 18–21, 21–19	(gold) Winner
2015	Suriname International	(Suriname) Jill Sjauw Mook	(Germany) Jonathan Persson (Brazil) Ana Paula Campos	9–21, 15–21	(silver) Runner-up

BWF International Challenge tournament
BWF International Series tournament
BWF Future Series tournament

=== South American Junior Championships ===
Boys' singles U-19
Year	Venue	Opponent	Score	Result
2010	Teresina, Piauí, Brazil	(Brazil) Lucas Alves Pinto	14–21, 14–21	Silver

Boys' doubles U-19
Year	Venue	Partner	Opponent	Score	Result
2010	Teresina, Piauí, Brazil	(Suriname) Irfan Djabar	(Brazil) Rodolfo Augusto Salles Almeida (Brazil) Gabriel Keiti Tsukada Guibu	21–14, 21–5	Gold

Mixed doubles U-19
Year	Venue	Partner	Opponent	Score	Result
2010	Teresina, Piauí, Brazil	(Suriname) Arantxa Ilahibaks	(Brazil) Marcelo Hideki Tsuchida (Brazil) Vanessa Nakamura Tanaka	21–11, 21–13	Gold
