= Surinamese National Badminton Championships =

The Surinamese National Badminton Championships is a tournament organized by the Surinaamse Badminton Bond (SBB) the governing body for the sport of badminton in Suriname, to crown the best badminton players in Suriname.

The tournament started in 1966 and is held every year, except for the years 1971, 1986, 1989, 2002 and 2007 when no National championships were held. Since the year 2000 the National Championships of Suriname is divided between Category A for elite players and Category B for recreational players. Furthermore a National Junior Championships is also organized every year. There also used to be yearly Surinamese National Badminton Club Championships for club teams held since 1964.

== Past winners National Championships Category A ==
| Year | No. | Men's singles | Women's singles | Men's doubles | Women's doubles | Mixed doubles |
|---|---|---|---|---|---|---|
| 1965 - 1966 | 1 | Romeo Ebeciljo Caster | Lilian Bendter | Romeo Ebeciljo Caster; Karel Bueno de Mesquita | Jacqueline Zwennicker; Julia Gefferie | Romeo Ebeciljo Caster; Lilian Bendter |
| 1966 - 1967 | 2 | Joseph Krieger | Annemarie Arias | Edmund Bleau; Lud Nijman | Jacqueline Zwennicker; Julia Gefferie | Edmund Bleau; Jacqueline Zwennicker |
| 1968 | 3 | Romeo Ebeciljo Caster | Lilian Bendter | Romeo Ebeciljo Caster; Theo Bueno de Mesquita | Maria Ho; Eline Chin Yun | Romeo Ebeciljo Caster; Lilian Bendter |
| 1969 | 4 | Romeo Ebeciljo Caster | Cornelly da Silva | Romeo Ebeciljo Caster; Theo Bueno de Mesquita | Cornelly da Silva; Johanna Asin | Walter Illes; Hildegard Illes |
| 1970 | 5 | Romeo Ebeciljo Caster | Cornelly da Silva | Romeo Ebeciljo Caster; Theo Bueno de Mesquita | Maria Ho; Ingrid Kong | Raymond Sjauw Mook; Eline Chin Yun |
| 1971 | National Championships not held | | | | | |
| 1972 | 6 | Walther Illes | Annemarie Hensen-Arias | Roel Sjauw Mook; Reginald Chin Jong | Lilian Bendter; Cornelly da Silva | Walther Illes; Annemarie Hensen-Arias |
| 1973 | 7 | Romeo Ebeciljo Caster | Cornelly da Silva | Roel Sjauw Mook; Otmar Arti Kersout | Lilian Bendter; Cornelly da Silva | Romeo Ebeciljo Caster; Lilian Bendter |
| 1974 | 8 | Walther Illes | Cornelly da Silva | Raymond Sjauw Mook; Emanuel Sjauw Mook | Loes Jong A Pin; Sandra Apon | Walther Illes; Jenny Willemsz |
| 1975 | 9 | Romeo Ebeciljo Caster | Sonja Leckie | Raymond Sjauw Mook; Roel Sjauw Mook | Sonja Leckie; Joyce Henning | Romeo Ebeciljo Caster; Sonja Leckie |
| 1976 | 10 | Romeo Ebeciljo Caster | Sonja Leckie | Roel Sjauw Mook; Otmar Arti Kersout | Loes Jong A Pin; Kathleen Burke | Raymond Sjauw Mook; Diana Uiterloo |
| 1977 | 11 | Romeo Ebeciljo Caster | Sonja Leckie | Raymond Sjauw Mook; Emanuel Sjauw Mook | Sonja Leckie; Diana Uiterloo | Reginald Chin Jong; Diana Uiterloo |
| 1978 | 12 | Otmar Arti Kersout | Sonja Leckie | Roel Sjauw Mook; Otmar Arti Kersout | Sonja Leckie; Diana Uiterloo | Otmar Arti Kersout; Sonja Leckie |
| 1979 | 13 | Mike van Daal | Sonja Leckie | | | |
| 1980 | 14 | Mike van Daal | Cornelly Emanuelson - da Silva | | | |
| 1981 | 15 | Mike van Daal | Sonja Leckie | | Ivy Wongsodimedjo | Mike van Daal; Henriette Blokland |
| 1982 | 16 | Mike van Daal | Olivia Wijntuin | | | Mike van Daal; Henriette Blokland |
| 1983 | 17 | Mike van Daal | Olivia Wijntuin | Mike van Daal; Clyde van Daal | Olivia Wijntuin; Diana Uiterloo | Mike van Daal; Henriette Blokland |
| 1984 | 18 | Mike van Daal | Olivia Wijntuin | Mike van Daal; Clyde van Daal | Rinia Haynes; Sherida Ramzan | Mike van Daal; Henriette Blokland |
| 1985 | 19 | Mike van Daal | Ivy Wongsodimedjo | Mike van Daal; Clyde van Daal | Tania Spreeuw; Sherida Ramzan | Mike van Daal; Mireille Pawironadi |
| 1986 | National Championships not held | | | | | |
| 1987 | 20 | Hedwig de la Fuente | | Reginald Chin Jong; Johnny Wagiso | Rinia Haynes | Johnny Wagiso |
| 1988 | 21 | Hedwig de la Fuente | Yu Nilen Shoh Chung | Roel Sjauw Mook; Otmar Arti Kersout | Loes Sjauw Mook; Yu Nilen Shoh Chung | Reginald Chin Jong; Yu Nilen Shoh Chung |
| 1989 | National Championships not held | | | | | |
| 1990 | 22 | Hedwig de la Fuente | Rinia Haynes | Roel Sjauw Mook; Emanuel Sjauw Mook | Diana Adams; Anne Top-Watkin | Clyde van Daal; Irene Haynes |
| 1991 | 23 | Oscar Brandon | Rinia Haynes | Oscar Brandon; Hedwig de la Fuente | Rinia Haynes; Irene Haynes | Oscar Brandon; Rinia Haynes |
| 1992 | 24 | Mike van Daal | Rinia Haynes | Mike van Daal; Clyde van Daal | Women's doubles event not held | Mike van Daal; Tania Spreeuw |
| 1993 | 25 | Oscar Brandon | Women's singles event not held | | | Oscar Brandon |
| 1994 | 26 | Oscar Brandon | Rinia Haynes | Oscar Brandon | | Oscar Brandon |
| 1995 | 27 | Oscar Brandon | Rinia Haynes | Oscar Brandon | | Oscar Brandon; Nathalie Haynes |
| 1996 | 28 | Oscar Brandon | Rinia Haynes | Oscar Brandon | Nathalie Haynes | Oscar Brandon |
| 1997 | 29 | Oscar Brandon | Nathalie Haynes | Oscar Brandon; Derrick Stjeward | | Oscar Brandon; Nathalie Haynes |
| 1998 | 30 | Oscar Brandon | Nathalie Haynes | Oscar Brandon; Derrick Stjeward | Nathalie Haynes; Irene Haynes | Oscar Brandon; Nathalie Haynes |
| 1999 | 31 | Oscar Brandon | Carolyn Davids | Oscar Brandon; Derrick Stjeward | Carolyn Davids; Danielle Melchiot | Oscar Brandon; Irene Haynes |
| 2000 | 32 | Oscar Brandon | Carolyn Davids | Mitchel Wongsodikromo; Virgil Soeroredjo | Nathalie Haynes; Danielle Melchiot | Virgil Soeroredjo; Nathalie Haynes |
| 2001 | 33 | Oscar Brandon | Carolyn Davids | Oscar Brandon; Redon Coulor | Carolyn Davids; Sherita Breidel | Oscar Brandon; Nathalie Haynes |
| 2002 | National Championships not held | | | | | |
| 2003 | 34 | Mitchel Wongsodikromo | Carolyn Davids | Mitchel Wongsodikromo; Virgil Soeroredjo | Carolyn Davids; Stephanie Jadi | Mitchel Wongsodikromo; Carolyn Davids |
| 2004 | 35 | Virgil Soeroredjo | Carolyn Davids | Mitchel Wongsodikromo; Virgil Soeroredjo | | Mitchel Wongsodikromo; Carolyn Davids |
| 2005 | 36 | Mitchel Wongsodikromo | Carolyn Davids | Derrick Stjeward; Virgil Soeroredjo | Carolyn Davids; Jill Sjauw Mook | Mitchel Wongsodikromo; Carolyn Davids |
| 2006 | 37 | Virgil Soeroredjo | Women's singles event not held | Mitchel Wongsodikromo; Virgil Soeroredjo | Nathalie Haynes; Sefanja Esajas | Virgil Soeroredjo; Stephanie Jadi |
| 2007 | National Championships not held | | | | | |
| 2008 | 38 | Virgil Soeroredjo | Danielle Melchiot | Mitchel Wongsodikromo; Virgil Soeroredjo | Irene Haynes; Nathalie Haynes | Mitchel Wongsodikromo; Nathalie Haynes |
| 2009 | 39 | Mitchel Wongsodikromo | Crystal Leefmans | Oscar Brandon; Mitchel Wongsodikromo | Crystal Leefmans; Quennie Pawirosemito | Mitchel Wongsodikromo; Nathalie Haynes |
| 2010 | 40 | Mitchel Wongsodikromo | Crystal Leefmans | Mitchel Wongsodikromo; Redon Coulor | | Dylan Darmohoetomo; Crystal Leefmans |
| 2011 | 41 | Virgil Soeroredjo | Danielle Melchiot | Virgil Soeroredjo; Mitchel Wongsodikromo | Rugshaar Ishaak; Santusha Ramzan | Virgil Soeroredjo; Priscille Tjitrodipo |
| 2012 | 42 | Mitchel Wongsodikromo | Crystal Leefmans | Mitchel Wongsodikromo; Redon Coulor | Crystal Leefmans; Priscille Tjitrodipo | Mitchel Wongsodikromo; Crystal Leefmans |
| 2013 | 43 | Virgil Soeroredjo | Danielle Melchiot | Sören Opti; Virgil Soeroredjo | Stephanie Jadi; Danielle Melchiot | Oscar Brandon; Stephanie Jadi |
| 2014 | 44 | Virgil Soeroredjo | Crystal Leefmans | Redon Coulor; Irfan Djabar | Crystal Leefmans; Priscille Tjitrodipo | Mitchel Wongsodikromo; Crystal Leefmans |
| 2015 | 45 | Dylan Darmohoetomo | Crystal Leefmans | Dylan Darmohoetomo; Gilmar Jones | Crystal Leefmans; Shemara Lindveld | Dylan Darmohoetomo; Jill Sjauw Mook |
| 2016 | 46 | Sören Opti | Santusha Ramzan | Sören Opti; Irfan Djabar | Caroline Jameson; Sherifa Jameson | Mitchel Wongsodikromo; Santusha Ramzan |
| 2017 | 47 | Sören Opti | Santusha Ramzan | Gilmar Jones; Dylan Darmohoetomo | Crystal Leefmans; Priscille Tjitrodipo | Gilmar Jones; Priscille Tjitrodipo |
| 2018 | 48 | Sören Opti | Jill Sjauw Mook | Sören Opti; Oscar Brandon | Crystal Leefmans; Priscille Tjitrodipo | Gilmar Jones; Rugshaar Ishaak |
| 2019 | 49 | Sören Opti | Imani Mangroe | Mitchel Wongsodikromo; Danny Chen | Imani Mangroe; Chaista Soemodipoero | Gilmar Jones; Anjali Paragsingh |
| 2020 | National Championships not held due to COVID-19 pandemic | | | | | |
| 2021 | National Championships not held due to COVID-19 pandemic | | | | | |
| 2022 | 50 | Sören Opti | Chan Chan Yang | Rivano Bisphan; Dylan Darmohoetomo | Crystal Leefmans; Kayleigh Moenne | Gilmar Jones; Chan Chan Yang |
| 2023 | 51 | Sören Opti | Women's singles event not held | Sören Opti; Mitchel Wongsodikromo | Faith Sariman; Sion Zegelaar | Rivano Bisphan; Chan Chan Yang |
| 2024 | 52 | Sören Opti | Women's singles event not held | Sören Opti; Mitchel Wongsodikromo | Crystal Leefmans; Chan Chan Yang | Rivano Bisphan; Sion Zegelaar |
| 2025 | 53 | Sören Opti | Sion Zegelaar | Sören Opti; Mitchel Wongsodikromo | Women's doubles event not held | Danny Chen; Chan Chan Yang |
| 2026 | 53 | Sören Opti | Megan Peng | Sören Opti; Danny Chen | Crystal Leefmans; Priscille Tjitrodipo | Sören Opti; Crystal Leefmans |
