= Jada Renales =

Trinidad and Tobago badminton player

Personal information
- Born: 27 December 1998 (age 27)

Sport
- Country: Trinidad and Tobago
- Sport: Badminton

Women's & mixed doubles
- Highest ranking: 574 (WD) 27 Aug 2015; 1014 (XD) 12 May 2016
- BWF profile

Jada Renales (born 27 December 1998) is a Trinidadian badminton player. Renales is coached by her father, Derwin Renales, a former national badminton player. She was the national under-19 champion for three consecutive years. At the 2012-2016 Carebaco Junior International tournament, she was 6 times in the second place and 5 times in third place. In 2014, she represented her country competed at the Veracruz Central American and Caribbean Games. In 2017, she won double title at the Solo Open Championships. She clinched the women's and mixed doubles title, and also place second in the singles event. She also received the TTBA's 2012 Most Outstanding Female Junior, 2014 Female Player of the Year, and 2015 Junior Female Player of the Year.

== Achievements ==
=== BWF International Challenge/Series ===
Women's Doubles

Year	Tournament	Partner	Opponent	Score	Result
2016	Suriname International	(Trinidad and Tobago) Solangel Guzman	(Suriname) Sherifa Jameson (Suriname) Anjali Paragsingh	21–11, 21–9	(gold) Winner

BWF International Challenge tournament
BWF International Series tournament
BWF Future Series tournament
