= Badminton at the 2002 Central American and Caribbean Games =

Tournament details
- Dates: 19–30 November
- Edition: 2
- Location: San Salvador, El Salvador

Badminton competition at the 2002 Central American and Caribbean Games took place between 19–30 November in San Salvador, El Salvador. It was the second appearance for badminton at the Games. There were 48 athletes from 9 countries competing in five events.

== Medal summary ==
=== Medal table ===
* Host nation (El Salvador)

Rank	Nation	Gold	Silver	Bronze	Total
1	Jamaica (JAM)	3	2	1	6
2	Guatemala (GUA)	2	1	0	3
3	Mexico (MEX)	0	1	3	4
4	Barbados (BAR)	0	1	0	1
5	Trinidad and Tobago (TRI)	0	0	4	4
6	Suriname (SUR)	0	0	2	2
Totals (6 entries)		5	5	10	20

=== Men's events ===
Event	Gold	Silver	Bronze
Singles	Pedro Yang (GUA)	Charles Pyne (JAM)	Mitchel Wongsodikromo (SUR); Virgil Soeroredjo (SUR)
Doubles	Guatemala (GUA); Pedro Yang; Erick Anguiano	Jamaica (JAM); Bradley Graham; Albert Myles	Trinidad and Tobago (TRI); Anil Seepaul; Kerwyn Pantin; Mexico (MEX); Bernaldo Monreal; Arturo Amaya

=== Women's events ===
Event	Gold	Silver	Bronze
Singles	Nigella Saunders (JAM)	Verónica Estrada (MEX)	Abigail García (MEX); Sabrina Cassie (TRI)
Doubles	Jamaica (JAM); Terry Walker; Nigella Saunders	Barbados (BAR); Dionne Forde; Mariana Eastmond	Trinidad and Tobago (TRI); Kesma Benito; Nadine Julien; Mexico (MEX); Abigail García; Laura Amaya

=== Mixed events ===
Event	Gold	Silver	Bronze
Doubles	Jamaica (JAM); Charles Pyne; Nigella Saunders	Guatemala (GUA); Pedro Yang; Annelisse Micheo	Jamaica (JAM); Bradley Graham; Terry Walker; Trinidad and Tobago (TRI); Anil Seepaul; Zeudi Mack

== Results ==
Men's singles

Semifinals
1	(Guatemala) Pedro Yang	15	15
(Suriname) Virgil Soeroredjo	3	0
(Suriname) Mitchel Wongsodikromo	7	7
2	(Jamaica) Charles Pyne	15	15

Final
1	(Guatemala) Pedro Yang	15	15
(Jamaica) Charles Pyne	9	12

Women's singles

Semifinals
(Trinidad and Tobago) Sabrina Cassie	11	3	2
(Mexico) Verónica Estrada	9	11	11
(Jamaica) Nigella Saunders	11	11
2	(Mexico) Abigail García	5	7

Final
(Mexico) Verónica Estrada	11	1	2
(Jamaica) Nigella Saunders	9	11	11

Men's doubles

Semifinals
(Trinidad and Tobago) Anil Seepaul (Trinidad and Tobago) Kerwyn Pantin	7	11
(Jamaica) Bradley Graham (Jamaica) Albert Myles	15	15
(Mexico) Bernaldo Monreal (Mexico) Arturo Amaya	11	10
2	(Guatemala) Pedro Yang (Guatemala) Erick Anguiano	15	15

Final
(Jamaica) Bradley Graham (Jamaica) Albert Myles	5	12
2	(Guatemala) Pedro Yang (Guatemala) Erick Anguiano	15	15

Women's doubles

Semifinals
(Mexico) Abigail García (Mexico) Laura Amaya	2	0
(Jamaica) Terry Walker (Jamaica) Nigella Saunders	11	11
(Barbados) Dionne Forde (Barbados) Mariana Eastmond	13	11
(Trinidad and Tobago) Kesma Benito (Trinidad and Tobago) Nadine Julien	10	8

Final
(Jamaica) Terry Walker (Jamaica) Nigella Saunders	11	11
2	(Barbados) Dionne Forde (Barbados) Mariana Eastmond	3	7

Mixed doubles

Semifinals
(Guatemala) Pedro Yang (Guatemala) Annelisse Micheo	11	11
(Jamaica) Bradley Graham (Jamaica) Terry Walker	3	9
(Jamaica) Charles Pyne (Jamaica) Nigella Saunders	13	11
2	(Trinidad and Tobago) Anil Seepaul (Trinidad and Tobago) Zeudi Mack	10	9

Final
(Guatemala) Pedro Yang (Guatemala) Annelisse Micheo	8	13	10
2	(Jamaica) Charles Pyne (Jamaica) Nigella Saunders	11	11	13

== Participants ==
Country	Men's	Women's	Total athletes
Barbados (BAR)	Curwin Cherubin; Andre Omar Padmore; Ryan Holder	Dionne Natasha Forde; Mariana Ayanna Eastmond	5
El Salvador (ESA)	Oscar Antonio Abrego Reyes; José Osmin Nieto Álvarez; Carlos Pérez	Abigail Chavez; Karen Ramirez	5
Jamaica (JAM)	Bradley Graham; Albert Nyles; Alex Haddad; Charles Pyne	Nigella Saunders; Terry Walker	6
Puerto Rico (PUR)	Victor Perez; Angel M. Santana	–	2
Suriname (SUR)	Mitchel Wongsodikromo; Virgil Soeroredjo	–	2
Dominican Republic (DOM)	Nelson Javier Ozuna; Roberto Rodriguez; Héctor Pena; Pedro Pena	Fiordaliza Reyes; Nairobis Castillo	6
Guatemala (GUA)	Pedro Yang; Erick Anguiano; David López; Kevin Cordón	Marlin Maldonado; Annelisse Micheo	6
Mexico (MEX)	José Ramón Noria; Bernaldo Monreal; Arturo Amaya; Luis Suárez	María de la Paz Luna Félix; Veronica Estrada; Abigail García; Laura Amaya	8
Trinidad and Tobago (TRI)	Mohammed S. Anil Seepaul; Kerwyn Pantin; Glendon Thomas	Sabrina Cassie; Zeudi Mack; Kesma Benito; Nadine Julien	8
