= French Guiana International =

The French Guiana International is an open international badminton tournament in French Guiana, an overseas department and region of France. It was the highest international championship in French Guiana. The event is part of the Badminton World Federation's Future Series and part of the Badminton Pan America's circuit. The inaugural edition was held in 2023.

== Previous winners ==
Year	Men's singles	Women's singles	Men's doubles	Women's doubles	Mixed doubles
2023	(United States) Howard Shu	(Mauritius) Kate Ludik	(Suriname) Sören Opti (Suriname) Mitchel Wongsodikromo	no competition	(French Guiana) Peter Dirifo (French Guiana) Elize Nijean
2024	No competition				
2025	No competition				

== Performances by nation ==
As of the 2023 edition

Pos.	Nation	MS	WS	MD	WD	XD	Total
1	French Guiana	0	0	0	0	1	1
1	Mauritius	0	1	0	0	0	1
1	Suriname	0	0	1	0	0	1
1	United States	1	0	0	0	0	1
Total		1	1	1	0	1	4
