= Suriname International =

Badminton tournament

The Suriname International Badminton Tournament is a Pan American Circuit badminton event first held inaugural in 1998 at the Anthony Nesty Indoor Stadium in Paramaribo, Suriname. The Suriname International Badminton Tournament is now held annually in Paramaribo since 2008, and is hosted by the Surinamese Badminton Association (SBB) also sanctioned by the Badminton World Federation (BWF) and the Badminton Pan America (Badminton Pan Am)

== Past winners ==
Below is the list of all the past winners.

Year	Men's singles	Women's singles	Men's doubles	Women's doubles	Mixed doubles	Ref
1998	(Suriname) Oscar Brandon	(Canada) Denyse Julien	(Canada) Iain Sydie (Canada) Brent Olynyk	(Canada) Denyse Julien (Canada) Charmaine Reid	(Canada) Iain Sydie (Canada) Denyse Julien	
1999– 2007	No competition					
2008	(Suriname) Virgil Soeroredjo	(Barbados) Shari Watson	(Suriname) Mitchel Wongsodikromo (Suriname) Virgil Soeroredjo	(Suriname) Nathalie Haynes (Suriname) Danielle Melchiot	(Suriname) Virgil Soeroredjo (Suriname) Nathalie Haynes	
2009	(Suriname) Virgil Soeroredjo	(Suriname) Danielle Melchiot	(Suriname) Mitchel Wongsodikromo (Suriname) Virgil Soeroredjo	No competition	(Suriname) Mitchel Wongsodikromo (Suriname) Priscila Tjitrodipo	
2010	(Guatemala) Kevin Cordón	(Peru) Cristina Aicardi	(Guatemala) Kevin Cordón (Guatemala) Rodolfo Ramírez	(Peru) Cristina Aicardi (Peru) Alejandra Monteverde	(Suriname) Virgil Soeroredjo (Suriname) Mireille van Daal	
2011	(Portugal) Pedro Martins	(Turkey) Neslihan Yiğit	(Suriname) Mitchel Wongsodikromo (Suriname) Virgil Soeroredjo	(Turkey) Özge Bayrak (Turkey) Neslihan Yiğit	(Brazil) Hugo Arthuso (Brazil) Fabiana Silva	
2012	(Israel) Misha Zilberman	(Netherlands) Patty Stolzenbach	(Guatemala) Humblers Heymard (Guatemala) Aníbal Marroquín	(Suriname) Crystal Leefmans (Suriname) Priscila Tjitrodipo	(Suriname) Mitchel Wongsodikromo (Suriname) Crystal Leefmans	
2013	(Cuba) Osleni Guerrero	(Trinidad and Tobago) Solángel Guzmán	(Netherlands) Dave Khodabux (Netherlands) Joris van Soerland	(Suriname) Crystal Leefmans (Suriname) Priscila Tjitrodipo	(Netherlands) Dave Khodabux (Netherlands) Elisa Piek	
2014	(Cuba) Osleni Guerrero	(Peru) Daniela Macías	(Peru) Mario Cuba (Peru) Martin del Valle	(Peru) Katherine Winder (Peru) Luz María Zornoza	(Peru) Mario Cuba (Peru) Katherine Winder	
2015	(Cuba) Osleni Guerrero	(Portugal) Telma Santos	(Mexico) Job Castillo (Mexico) Lino Munoz	(Mexico) Haramara Gaitan (Mexico) Sabrina Solis	(Germany) Jonathan Persson (Brazil) Ana Paula Campos	
2016	(Israel) Misha Zilberman	(Trinidad and Tobago) Solángel Guzmán	(Barbados) Cory Fanus (Barbados) Dakeil Thorpe	(Trinidad and Tobago) Solángel Guzmán (Trinidad and Tobago) Jada Renales	(Israel) Misha Zilberman (Israel) Svetlana Zilberman	
2017	(Canada) Brian Yang	(Cuba) Tahimara Oropeza	(Jamaica) Dennis Coke (Jamaica) Anthony McNee	(Barbados) Monyata Riviera (Barbados) Tamisha Williams	(Cuba) Leodannis Martinez (Cuba) Tahimara Oropeza	
2018	(Guatemala) Kevin Cordón	(Belgium) Lianne Tan	(Jamaica) Dennis Coke (Jamaica) Anthony McNee	(Peru) Daniela Macías (Peru) Dánica Nishimura	(Dominican Republic) César Brito (Dominican Republic) Bermary Polanco	
2019	(Canada) Brian Yang	(Mexico) Haramara Gaitán	(Suriname) Mitchel Wongsodikromo (Suriname) Danny Chen	(Peru) Daniela Macías (Peru) Dánica Nishimura	(Barbados) Shae Martin (Barbados) Sabrina Scott	
2020	Cancelled (Note: This tournament, originally to be played from 10 to 14 November, was later cancelled due to COVID-19 pandemic in Suriname.)					
2021– 2022	No competition					
2023	(El Salvador) Uriel Canjura	(Mexico) Haramara Gaitán	(Suriname) Sören Opti (Suriname) Mitchel Wongsodikromo	(Mexico) Haramara Gaitan (Mexico) Sabrina Solis	(Suriname) Mitchel Wongsodikromo (French Guiana) Loriane Dréan	
2024	(Israel) Misha Zilberman	(Peru) Inés Castillo	(Suriname) Sören Opti (Suriname) Mitchel Wongsodikromo	(Peru) Inés Castillo (Peru) Namie Miyahira	(Guatemala) Christopher Martínez (Guatemala) Diana Corleto	
2025	(El Salvador) Uriel Canjura	(Switzerland) Dounia Pelupessy	(Peru) Adriano Viale (Israel) Misha Zilberman	(Italy) Martina Corsini (Italy) Emma Piccinin	(Trinidad and Tobago) Parth Mehta (Trinidad and Tobago) Chequeda de Boulet	
2026	(Azerbaijan) Ade Resky Dwicahyo	(Azerbaijan) Keisha Fatimah Azzahra	(Azerbaijan) Ade Resky Dwicahyo (Azerbaijan) Dicky Dwi Pangestu	(Peru) Naomi Junco (Peru) Namie Miyahira	(Azerbaijan) Dicky Dwi Pangestu (Azerbaijan) Keisha Fatimah Azzahra	

== Finals ==
=== 2026 Ring Sport Center, Paramaribo ===
Category	Winners	Runners-up	Score
Men's singles	(Azerbaijan) Ade Resky Dwicahyo	(Azerbaijan) Dicky Dwi Pangestu	21–12, 21–17
Women's singles	(Azerbaijan) Keisha Fatimah Azzahra	(Peru) Inés Castillo	21–19, 20–22, 21–14
Men's doubles	(Azerbaijan) Ade Resky Dwicahyo / Dicky Dwi Pangestu	(Malaysia) Andy Kok / Lim Yu Sheng	21–8, 21–10
Women's doubles	(Peru) Naomi Junco / Nami Miyahira	(Trinidad and Tobago) Aliyah Urquhart / Amara Urquhart	21–8, 21–5
Mixed doubles	(Azerbaijan) Dicky Dwi Pangestu / Keisha Fatimah Azzahra	(Suriname) Sören Opti / Crystal Leefmans	21–10, 21–16

=== 2025 Ring Sport Center, Paramaribo ===
Category	Winners	Runners-up	Score
Men's singles	(El Salvador) Uriel Canjura	(Switzerland) Julien Scheiwiller	18–21, 21–8, 21–9
Women's singles	(Switzerland) Dounia Pelupessy	(Czech Republic) Sharleen van Coppenolle	17–21, 21–11, 21–15
Men's doubles	(Peru) Adriano Viale / (Israel) Misha Zilberman	(Slovakia) Andrej Suchý / Simeon Suchý	22–20, 21–18
Women's doubles	(Italy) Martina Corsini / Emma Piccinin	(Lithuania) Viltė Paulauskaitė / (Czech Republic) Sharleen van Coppenolle	21–16, 21–9
Mixed doubles	(Trinidad and Tobago) Parth Mehta / Chequeda de Boulet	(Suriname) Al-Hassan Somedjo / Faith Sariman	21–11, 21–6

=== 2024 Ring Sport Center, Paramaribo ===
Category	Winners	Runners-up	Score
Men's singles	(Israel) Misha Zilberman	(Peru) Adriano Viale	21–12, 23–21
Women's singles	(Peru) Inés Castillo	(Mexico) Sabrina Solís	21–15, 21–16
Men's doubles	(Suriname) Sören Opti / Mitchel Wongsodikromo	(Suriname) Rivano Bisphan / Danny Chen	21–14, 21–8
Women's doubles	(Peru) Inés Castillo / Namie Miyahira	(Trinidad and Tobago) Chequeda de Boulet / (Guyana) Priyanna Ramdhani	21–16, 21–12
Mixed doubles	(Guatemala) Christopher Martínez / Diana Corleto	(Suriname) Rivano Bisphan / Sion Zeegelaar	21–14, 21–6

=== 2023 Ring Sport Center, Paramaribo ===
Category	Winners	Runners-up	Score
Men's singles	(El Salvador) Uriel Canjura	(Italy) Giovanni Toti	21–11, 21–12
Women's singles	(Mexico) Haramara Gaitán	(Mexico) Sabrina Solis	18–21, 21–9, 21–17
Men's doubles	(Suriname) Sören Opti / Mitchel Wongsodikromo	(Suriname) Diego Dos Ramos / Al-Hassan Somedjo	21–18, 21–9
Women's doubles	(Mexico) Haramara Gaitan / Sabrina Solis	(Trinidad and Tobago) Amara Urquhart / (Suriname) Chan Yang	21–7, 21–11
Mixed doubles	(Suriname) Mitchel Wongsodikromo / (French Guiana) Loriane Dréan	(Suriname) Rivano Bisphan / Sion Zeegelaar	21–18, 21–17

=== 2019 Ring Sport Center, Paramaribo ===
Category	Winners	Runners-up	Score
Men's singles	(Canada) Brian Yang	(Guatemala) Kevin Cordon	Walkover
Women's singles	(Mexico) Haramara Gaitán	(Czech Republic) Tereza Švábíková	16–21, 21–10, 23–21
Men's doubles	(Suriname) Mitchel Wongsodikromo / Danny Chen	(Barbados) Shae Michael Martin / Gavin Robinson	21–18, 21–15
Women's doubles	(Peru) Daniela Macías / Dánica Nishimura	(Barbados) Monyata Riviera / Sabrina Scott	21–4, 21–7
Mixed doubles	(Barbados) Shae Michael Martin / Sabrina Scott	(Barbados) Gavin Robinson / Monyata Riviera	21–15, 21–16

=== 2018 Ring Sport Center, Paramaribo ===
Category	Winners	Runners-up	Score
Men's singles	(Guatemala) Kevin Cordon	(Belgium) Elias Bracke	21–13, 21–15
Women's singles	(Belgium) Lianne Tan	(Peru) Daniela Macías	21–10, 21–6
Men's doubles	(Jamaica) Dennis Coke / Anthony McNee	(Guatemala) Rodolfo Ramírez / Jonathan Solís	Walkover
Women's doubles	(Peru) Daniela Macías / Dánica Nishimura	(Guatemala) Nikté Sotomayor / Diana Corleto	21–10, 21–12
Mixed doubles	(Dominican Republic) Cesar Brito / Bermary Polanco	(Suriname) Mitchel Wongsodikromo / (Jamaica) Katherine Wynter	21–10, 21–16

=== 2017 Ismay van Wilgen Sporthal, Paramaribo ===
Category	Winners	Runners-up	Score
Men's singles	(Canada) Brian Yang	(Cuba) Osleni Guerrero	12–21, 21–17, 21–14
Women's singles	(Cuba) Tahimara Oropeza	(Peru) Fernanda Saponara Rivva	21–19, 21–8
Men's doubles	(Jamaica) Dennis Coke / Anthony Mcnee	(Jamaica) Gareth Henry / Samuel Ricketts	8–21, 21–19, 21–18
Women's doubles	(Barbados) Monyata Riviera / Tamisha Williams	(Suriname) Crystal Leefmans / Priscila Tjitrodipo	21–17, 21–17
Mixed doubles	(Cuba) Leodannis Martinez / Tahimara Oropeza	(Jamaica) Dennis Coke / Katherine Wynter	21–16, 21–18

=== 2016 Ismay van Wilgen Sporthal, Paramaribo ===
Category	Winners	Runners-up	Score
Men's singles	(Israel) Misha Zilberman	(Belgium) Maxime Moreels	21–14, 12–21, 21–12
Women's singles	(Trinidad and Tobago) Solángel Guzmán	(Barbados) Tamisha Williams	24–26, 21–12, 21–5
Men's doubles	(Barbados) Cory Fanus / Dakeil Jonathan Thorpe	(Suriname) Mitchel Wongsodikromo / Alrick Toney	21–16, 21–12
Women's doubles	(Trinidad and Tobago) Solángel Guzmán / Jada Renales	(Suriname) Sherifa Jameson / Anjali Paragsingh	21–11, 21–9
Mixed doubles	(Israel) Misha Zilberman / Svetlana Zilberman	(Trinidad and Tobago) Alistair Espinoza / Solángel Guzmán	21–14, 21–15

=== 2015 Ismay van Wilgen Sporthal, Paramaribo ===
Category	Winners	Runners-up	Score
Men's singles	(Cuba) Osleni Guerrero	(United States) Howard Shu	21–11, 21–16
Women's singles	(Portugal) Telma Santos	(Brazil) Lohaynny Vicente	No match
Men's doubles	(Mexico) Job Castillo / Lino Munoz	(Italy) Giovanni Greco / Rosario Maddaloni	No match
Women's doubles	(Mexico) Haramara Gaitan / Sabrina Solis	(Brazil) Ana Paula Campos / Fabiana Silva	No match
Mixed doubles	(Germany) / (Brazil) Jonathan Persson / Ana Paula Campos	(Suriname) Dylan Darmohoetomo / Jill Sjauw Mook	21–9, 21–15

=== 2014 Ismay van Wilgen Sporthal, Paramaribo ===
Category	Winners	Runners-up	Score
Men's singles	(Cuba) Osleni Guerrero	(Czech Republic) Jan Fröhlich	21–7, Retired
Women's singles	(Peru) Daniela Macías	(Peru) Dánica Nishimura	21–16, 21–12
Men's doubles	(Peru) Mario Cuba / Martin del Valle	(Suriname) Gilmar Jones / Mitchel Wongsodikromo	21–11, 21–14
Women's doubles	(Peru) Katherine Winder / Luz María Zornoza	(Peru) Daniela Macías / Dánica Nishimura	21–13, 21–14
Mixed doubles	(Peru) Mario Cuba / Katherine Winder	(Peru) Andrés Corpancho / Luz María Zornoza	21–12, 21–8

=== 2013 Ismay van Wilgen Sporthal, Paramaribo ===
Category	Winners	Runners-up	Score
Men's singles	(Cuba) Osleni Guerrero	(Czech Republic) Jan Fröhlich	21–11, 21–18
Women's singles	(Trinidad and Tobago) Solángel Guzmán	(Mexico) Haramara Gaitan	21–19, 20–22, 21–19
Men's doubles	(Netherlands) Dave Khodabux / Joris van Soerland	(Italy) Giovanni Greco / Rosario Maddaloni	21–14, 21–18
Women's doubles	(Suriname) Crystal Leefmans / Priscila Tjitrodipo	(Trinidad and Tobago) Solángel Guzmán / Virginia Chariandy	23–21, 21–16
Mixed doubles	(Netherlands) Dave Khodabux / Elisa Piek	(Suriname) Mitchel Wongsodikromo / Crystal Leefmans	21–17, 18–21, 21–19

=== 2012 Ismay van Wilgen Sporthal, Paramaribo ===
Category	Winners	Runners-up	Score
Men's singles	(Israel) Misha Zilberman	(Cuba) Osleni Guerrero	16–21, 21–18, 21–11
Women's singles	(Netherlands) Patty Stolzenbach	(Suriname) Crystal Leefmans	21–6, 21–12
Men's doubles	(Guatemala) Humblers Heymard / Aníbal Marroquín	(Suriname) Dylan Darmohoetomo / Irfan Djabar	21–11, 21–16
Women's doubles (round-robin)	(Suriname) Crystal Leefmans / Priscila Tjitrodipo	(Barbados) Mariama Eastmond / Dionne Forde	21–10, 21–11
Mixed doubles	(Suriname) Mitchel Wongsodikromo / Crystal Leefmans	(Guatemala) Rubén Castellanos / Nikté Sotomayor	21–12, 21–18

=== 2011 Anthony Nesty Indoor Stadium, Paramaribo ===
Category	Winners	Runners-up	Score
Men's singles	(Portugal) Pedro Martins	(Austria) Michael Lahnsteiner	14–21, 21–16, 21–18
Women's singles	(Turkey) Neslihan Yiğit	(Turkey) Özge Bayrak	21–16, 23–21
Men's doubles	(Suriname) Mitchel Wongsodikromo / Virgil Soeroredjo	(Brazil) Luiz Henrique dos Santos jr. / Alex Tjong	21–14, 21–17
Women's doubles	(Turkey) Özge Bayrak / Neslihan Yiğit	(Suriname) Crystal Leefmans / Rugshaar Ishaak	21–3, 21–7
Mixed doubles	(Brazil) Hugo Arthuso / Fabiana Silva	(Suriname) Mitchel Wongsodikromo / Crystal Leefmans	22–20, 21–18

=== 2010 Anthony Nesty Indoor Stadium, Paramaribo ===
Category	Winners	Runners-up	Score
Men's singles	(Guatemala) Kevin Cordón	(India) Abdul Aditya	23–21, 21–9
Women's singles	(Peru) Cristina Aicardi	(Peru) Alejandra Monteverde	21–19, 21–13
Men's doubles	(Guatemala) Kevin Cordón / Rodolfo Ramírez	(Suriname) Mitchel Wongsodikromo / Virgil Soeroredjo	21–14, 21–16
Women's doubles	(Peru) Cristina Aicardi / Alejandra Monteverde	(Suriname) Danielle Melchiot / Priscila Tjitrodipo	21–9, 21–13
Mixed doubles	(Suriname) Virgil Soeroredjo / Mireille van Daal	(Suriname) Mitchel Wongsodikromo / Priscila Tjitrodipo	21–8, 21–10

=== 2009 Anthony Nesty Indoor Stadium, Paramaribo ===
Category	Winners	Runners-up	Score
Men's singles	(Suriname) Virgil Soeroredjo	(Brazil) Daniel Paiola	21–19, 21–13
Women's singles	(Suriname) Danielle Melchiot	(Suriname) Crystal Leefmans	21–14, 18–21, 21–14
Men's doubles	(Suriname) Mitchel Wongsodikromo / Virgil Soeroredjo	(Suriname) / (Trinidad and Tobago) Oscar Brandon / Raul Rampersad	21–15, 21–16
Women's doubles			
Mixed doubles	(Suriname) Mitchel Wongsodikromo / Priscila Tjitrodipo	(Suriname) Irfan Djabar / Quennie Pawirosentono	21–16, 21–15

=== 2008 Anthony Nesty Indoor Stadium, Paramaribo ===
Category	Winners	Runners-up	Score
Men's singles	(Suriname) Virgil Soeroredjo	(Suriname) Mitchel Wongsodikromo	10–21, 21–13, 21–10
Women's singles	(Barbados) Shari Watson	(Curaçao) Milangela Plate	21–19, 21–17
Men's doubles	(Suriname) Mitchel Wongsodikromo / Virgil Soeroredjo	(Suriname) Dylan Darmohoetomo / Irfan Djabar	21–15, 21–15
Women's doubles	(Suriname) Nathalie Haynes / Danielle Melchiot	(Suriname) Crystal Leefmans / Quennie Pawirosentono	21–13, 21–19
Mixed doubles	(Suriname) Virgil Soeroredjo / Nathalie Haynes	(Suriname) Mitchel Wongsodikromo / Jill Sjauw Mook	21–16, 21–16

=== 1998 Anthony Nesty Indoor Stadium, Paramaribo ===
Category	Winners	Runners-up	Score
Men's singles	(Suriname) Oscar Brandon	(Jamaica) Roy Paul jr.	15–13, 12–15, 15–8
Women's singles	(Canada) Denyse Julien	(Canada) Charmaine Reid	11–9, 11–3
Men's doubles	(Canada) Brent Olynyk / Iain Sydie	(United States) Matt Fogarty / Dean Schoppe	15–3, 15–2
Women's doubles	(Canada) Denyse Julien / Charmaine Reid	(Peru) / (Suriname) Adrienn Kocsis / Nathalie Haynes	15–5, 15–4
Mixed doubles	(Canada) Iain Sydie / Denyse Julien	(Peru) Mario Carulla / Adrienn Kocsis	15–1, 15–9

== Successful players ==
Below is the list of the most ever successful players in the Suriname International Badminton Tournament with more than one title:

Name	MS	WS	MD	WD	XD	Total
(Suriname) Mitchel Wongsodikromo			6		3	9
(Suriname) Virgil Soeroredjo	2		3		2	7
(Israel) Misha Zilberman	3		1		1	5
(Mexico) Haramara Gaitán		2		2		4
(Guatemala) Kevin Cordón	2		1			3
(Cuba) Osleni Guerrero	3					3
(Trinidad and Tobago) Solángel Guzmán		2		1		3
(Canada) Denyse Julien		1		1	1	3
(Suriname) Crystal Leefmans				2	1	3
(Peru) Daniela Macías		1		2		3
(Suriname) Priscila Tjitrodipo				2	1	3
(Peru) Cristina Aicardi		1		1		2
(Jamaica) Dennis Coke			2			2
(Peru) Mario Cuba			1		1	2
(Suriname) Nathalie Haynes				1	1	2
(Netherlands) Dave Khodabux			1		1	2
(Peru) Dánica Nishimura				2		2
(Jamaica) Anthony McNee			2			2
(Suriname) Danielle Melchiot		1		1		2
(Cuba) Tahimara Oropeza		1			1	2
(Mexico) Sabrina Solis				2		2
(Canada) Iain Sydie			1		1	2
(Peru) Katherine Winder			1		1	2
(Canada) Brian Yang	2					2
(Turkey) Neslihan Yiğit		1		1		2
(Peru) Inés Castillo		1		1		2
(Suriname) Sören Opti			2			2
(El Salvador) Uriel Canjura	2					2
(Azerbaijan) Ade Resky Dwicahyo	1		1			2
(Azerbaijan) Keisha Fatimah Azzahra		1			1	2
(Azerbaijan) Dicky Dwi Pangestu			1		1	2
(Peru) Namie Miyahira				2		2

== Performances by nation ==
As of the 2026 edition

	Nation	MS	WS	MD	WD	XD	Total
1	Suriname*	3	1	6	3	4.5	17.5
2	Peru	0	3	1.5	6	1	11.5
3	Canada	2	1	1	1	1	6
4	Cuba	3	1	0	0	1	5
4	Guatemala	2	0	2	0	1	5
4	Mexico	0	2	1	2	0	5
7	Israel	3	0	0.5	0	1	4.5
8	Azerbaijan	1	1	1	0	1	4
8	Barbados	0	1	1	1	1	4
8	Trinidad and Tobago	0	2	0	1	1	4
11	Netherlands	0	1	1	0	1	3
12	El Salvador	2	0	0	0	0	2
12	Jamaica	0	0	2	0	0	2
12	Portugal	1	1	0	0	0	2
12	Turkey	0	1	0	1	0	2
16	Brazil	0	0	0	0	1.5	1.5
17	Belgium	0	1	0	0	0	1
17	Dominican Republic	0	0	0	0	1	1
17	Italy	0	0	0	1	0	1
17	Switzerland	0	1	0	0	0	1
21	French Guiana	0	0	0	0	0.5	0.5
21	Germany	0	0	0	0	0.5	0.5
Total		17	17	17	16	17	84

* Host nation
