= Carebaco Junior International =

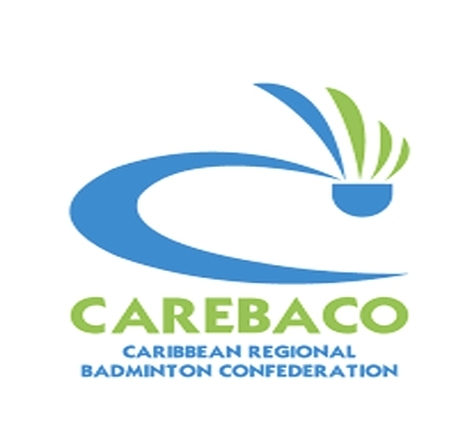
Carebaco logo

The Carebaco Junior International Badminton Championships is an open junior U19 tournament organized yearly since 2013 at the Carebaco Games by the Caribbean Regional Badminton Confederation (CAREBACO) normally one week prior to the Carebaco International.

The tournament is an event for under 19 year old junior individual players The Pan Am event is part of the BWF Future juniors series and therefore eligible for BWF Junior World Ranking Points. Member countries of Carebaco can apply in advance as candidates to organize the event as part of the complete yearly held Carebaco Games.

== Gold medal winners individual Carebaco Junior U19 open badminton Championships ==
Year	Host city	Boys' singles	Girls' singles	Boys' doubles	Girls' doubles	Mixed doubles
2019	St Michael, Barbados	(Canada) Joseph Lu	(Guyana) Priyanna Ramdhani	(Barbados) Kennie King (Barbados) Dominick Scantlebury	(Trinidad and Tobago) Chequeda De Boulet (Guyana) Priyanna Ramdhani	(Guyana) Tyrese Jeffrey (Guyana) Priyanna Ramdhani
2018	Paramaribo, Suriname	(Suriname) Danny Chen	(Guyana) Priyanna Ramdhani	(Suriname) Danny Chen (Suriname) Jair Naipal	(Trinidad and Tobago) Chequeda De Boulet (Guyana) Priyanna Ramdhani	(Suriname) Geordan Tjon Kon Joe (Suriname) Imani Mangroe
2017	Tacarigua, Trinidad and Tobago	(Italy) Giovanni Toti	(Peru) Fernanda Saponara	(Peru) Nicolas Macías (Peru) Diego Mini	(Peru) Inés Castillo (Peru) Paula la Torre Regal	(Dominican Republic) César Brito González (Dominican Republic) Nairoby Abigail Jiménez
2016	Oranjestad, Aruba	(Dominican Republic) César Brito González	(Dominican Republic) Bermary Polanco	(Barbados) Shae Michael Martin (Barbados) Keshem Moore	(Suriname) Santusha Ramzan (Suriname) Mary-Ann Zhong	(Barbados) Shae Michael Martin (Barbados) Amanda Haywood
2015	Santo Domingo, Dominican Republic	(Suriname) Sören Opti	(Dominican Republic) Bermary Polanco	(Dominican Republic) César Brito González (Dominican Republic) Angel Argenis Marinez Ulloa	(Dominican Republic) Nairoby Abigail Jiménez (Dominican Republic) Bermary Polanco	(Dominican Republic) César Brito González (Dominican Republic) Nairoby Abigail Jiménez
2014	Kingston, Jamaica	(Jamaica) Samuel Ricketts	(Jamaica) Katherine Wynter	(Jamaica) Samuel Ricketts (Jamaica) Sean Wilson	(Jamaica) Jade Clarke (Jamaica) Katherine Wynter	(Jamaica) Sean Wilson (Jamaica) Jade Clarke
2013	San Juan, Puerto Rico	(Guatemala) Ruben Castellanos	(Puerto Rico) Saribel Caceres Ramos	(Guatemala) Ruben Castellanos (Guatemala) Brandon Samayoa	(Dominican Republic) Yamile Martinez (Dominican Republic) Arianna Licelot Sanchez Matos	(Puerto Rico) Aleandro Roman Solas (Puerto Rico) Saribel Caceres Ramos
