= Sören Opti =

Surinamese badminton player

Personal information
- Born: Sören Hans Brad Opti; 16 May 1997 (age 29) Paramaribo, Suriname
- Height: 1.87 m (6 ft 2 in)

Sport
- Country: Suriname
- Sport: Badminton
- Handedness: Right

Men's singles & doubles
- Highest ranking: 209 (MS 13 August 2019); 228 (MD 15 October 2019); 347 (XD 22 November 2018)
- Current ranking: 274 (MS), 285 (MD) (23 July 2024)
- BWF profile

Sören Hans Brad Opti (born 16 May 1997) is a badminton player from Suriname. He is a two time Olympian, respresenting Suriname at the 2016 Rio Olympics and at the 2024 Paris Olympics. He was also selected to represent his country at the 2020 Tokyo Olympic Games, but had to stay home due to a positive Covid-test. During the opening ceremony of the 2016 Olympics, Opti was the flagbearer for Suriname. Opti participated in the 2014 and 2018 Central American and Caribbean Games.

== Career ==
After winning many National and Regional junior titles, he became Surinamese National Champion Men's Singles in 2016 and retained this title in 2017, 2018, 2019, 2022 and 2023. In 2016 and 2018 he was runner-up at the Carebaco International. In 2016 he reached the semi-finals at the Chile International and the Santo Domingo Open. He competed at the 2016 Rio Summer Olympics. He lost to both Lee Chong Wei of Malaysia and Derek Wong Zi Liang of Singapore during group play and did not advance further.

Opti participated at the 2019 Pan Am Games for Suriname in the Men's Singles and Men's Doubles events. In 2019 he reached the semi-finals in the Men's Doubles category with his doubles partner Mitch Nai Chung Tong at the Carebaco International in Bridgetown, Barbados. At the end of 2019 he joined the Cuntapay Badminton Academy (CBA) in Switzerland. In 2021, Opti received a Tripartite invitation for the 2020 Tokyo Olympics Men's Singles event. For the 2020 Tokyo Olympics Opti was placed by draw in a group with Shi Yuqi from China and Matthew Abela from Malta. However, due to attaining a positive Covid test upon departure to Tokyo, he had to withdraw his participation.

== Achievements ==
=== National badminton titles ===
- 2026 - National Championships : Men's Singles Gold, Men's Doubles Gold, Mixed Doubles Gold
- 2025 - National Championships : Men's Singles Gold, Men's Doubles Gold
- 2024 - National Championships : Men's Singles Gold, Men's Doubles Gold
- 2023 - National Championships : Men's Singles Gold, Men's Doubles Gold
- 2022 - National Championships : Men's Singles Gold
- 2019 - National Championships : Men's Singles Gold, Men's Doubles Bronze
- 2018 - National Championships : Men's Singles Gold, Men's Doubles Gold, Mixed Doubles Bronze
- 2017 - National Championships : Men's Singles Gold
- 2016 - National Championships : Men's Singles Gold, Men's Doubles Gold
- 2015 - National Junior Championships : Boys' Singles U19 Gold, Boys' Doubles U19 Gold, Mixed Doubles U19 Gold
- 2014 - National Championships : Men's Singles Silver, Men's Doubles Bronze, Mixed Doubles Silver
- 2014 - National Junior Championships : Boys' Singles U19 Gold, Boys' Doubles U19 Gold, Mixed Doubles U19 Gold
- 2013 - National Championships : Men's Singles Bronze, Men's Doubles Gold, Mixed Doubles Bronze
- 2013 - National Junior Championships : Boys' Singles U19 Gold, Boys' Doubles U19 Gold, Mixed Doubles U19 Gold
- 2013 - National Junior Championships : Boys' Singles U17 Gold, Boys' Doubles U17 Gold, Mixed Doubles U17 Gold
- 2012 - National Junior Championships : Boys' Singles U19 Gold, Boys' Doubles U19 Gold, Mixed Doubles U19 Gold
- 2012 - National Junior Championships : Boys' Singles U17 Gold, Boys' Doubles U17 Gold, Mixed Doubles U17 Gold
- 2011 - National Junior Championships : Boys' Singles U19 Gold, Boys' Doubles U19 Gold
- 2011 - National Junior Championships : Boys' Singles U17 Gold, Boys' Doubles U17 Gold, Mixed Doubles U17 Silver
- 2011 - National Junior Championships : Boys' Singles U15 Gold, Boys' Doubles U15 Gold, Mixed Doubles U15 Gold
- 2010 - National Junior Championships : Boys' Singles U19 Bronze
- 2010 - National Junior Championships : Boys' Singles U15 Gold, Mixed Doubles U15 Gold
- 2009 - National Junior Championships : Boys' Singles U19 Bronze, Boys' Doubles U19 Silver
- 2009 - National Junior Championships : Boys' Singles U15 Gold, Boys' Doubles U15 Gold, Mixed Doubles U15 Gold
- 2008 - National Junior Championships : Boys' Singles U13 Gold, Boys' Doubles U13 Gold, Mixed Doubles U13 Gold
- 2005 - National Junior Championships : Boys' Singles U11 Gold, Boys' Doubles U11 Gold, Mixed Doubles U11 Gold

6-time badminton athlete of the year in Suriname (2013, 2015, 2016, 2017, 2018 & 2019) Most Promising Sportman of the year in Suriname 2012

=== International badminton achievements ===
- 2026 - Suriname International (Paramaribo) Mixed Doubles Silver Finalist
- 2026 - Suriname International (Paramaribo) Men's Doubles Bronze Semi-Finalist
- 2025 - Suriname International (Paramaribo) Men's Doubles Bronze Semi-Finalist
- 2024 - Suriname International (Paramaribo) Men's Doubles Gold Winner
- 2023 - French Guiana International Men's Doubles Gold Winner, Men's Singles Bronze Semi-Finalist
- 2023 - Suriname International (Paramaribo) Men's Doubles Gold Winner
- 2019 - Carebaco International (Barbados) Men's Doubles Bronze Semi-Finalist
- 2019 - Pan American Games (Lima, Peru) Participant
- 2018 - CACSO Games (Barranquilla, Colombia) Participant
- 2018 - Carebaco International (Paramaribo) Men's Singles Silver Finalist
- 2016 - Santo Domingo Open Men's Singles Bronze Semi-Finalist
- 2016 - Carebaco International (Oranjestad, Aruba) Men's Singles Silver Finalist
- 2016 - Carebaco Games (Oranjestad, Aruba) Mixed Team Championships Silver
- 2016 - 2016 Rio Summer Olympics - Men's Singles (Brazil) Participant
- 2016 - Chile International Men's Singles Bronze Semi-Finalist
- 2015 - BWF World Junior Championships (Lima, Peru) Participant
- 2015 - Carebaco Junior International (Santo Domingo) U19 Boys' Singles Gold Winner & U19 Boys' Doubles Silver Finalist
- 2015 - Carebaco Games Junior (Santo Domingo) U19 Boys' Singles Silver Finalist, U19 Boys' Doubles Gold Winner
- 2015 - Peru Junior U19 International (Lima) U19 Boys' Singles Bronze Semi-Finalist
- 2014 - CACSO Games (Veracruz, Mexico) Participant
- 2014 - Suriname International (Paramaribo) Men's Doubles Bronze Semi-Finalist
- 2013 - Suriname International (Paramaribo) Men's Doubles Bronze Semi-Finalist & Mixed Doubles Bronze Semi-Finalist
- 2013 - South American Youth Games (Lima, Peru) U19 Boys' Singles Bronze Semi-Finalist & U19 Mixed Doubles Bronze Semi-Finalist
- 2013 - Carebaco Games Junior (San Juan, Puerto Rico) U17 Boys' Singles Silver Finalist, U17 Boys' Doubles Silver Finalist & U17 Mixed Doubles Gold Winner
- 2012 - South American Junior Championships (Lima, Peru) U17 Boys' Singles Bronze Semi-Finalist & U17 Boys' Doubles Silver Finalist
- 2012 - Carebaco Games Junior (Santo Domingo) U17 Boys' Singles Bronze Semi-Finalist, U17 Boys' Doubles Silver Finalist & U17 Mixed Doubles Silver Finalist
- 2012 - Carebaco Games Junior (Santo Domingo) Mixed Team Junior Championships Bronze
- 2012 - Junior Master Gulicktoernooi (Tegelen, the Netherlands) U17 Boys' Singles Gold Winner, U17 Boys' Doubles Gold Winner & U17 Mixed Doubles Gold Winner
- 2012 - Junior Master BCRS (Spijkenisse, the Netherlands) U17 Boys' Singles Gold Winner, U19 Boys' Doubles Silver Finalist & U17 Mixed Doubles Gold Winner
- 2011 - Carebaco Games Junior (Barbados) U15 Boys' Singles Gold Winner, U15 Boys' Doubles Gold Winner & U15 Mixed Doubles Gold Winner
- 2011 - Carebaco Games Junior (Barbados) Mixed Team Junior Championships Silver
- 2010 - Suriname International (Paramaribo) Men's Doubles Bronze Semi-Finalist
- 2008 - Pan Am Junior Badminton Championships (Guatemala) U15 Boys' Doubles Bronze Semi-Finalist
- 2008 - Suriname Junior International (Paramaribo) U13 Boys' Singles Gold Winner, U13 Boys' Doubles Gold Winner, U13 Mixed Doubles Gold Winner, U15 Boys' Singles Silver Finalist & U15 Boys' Doubles Gold Winner
- 2006 - Pan Am Junior Badminton Championships (Campinas, Brazil) U11 Boys' Singles Silver Finalist & U11 Boys' Doubles Bronze Semi-Finalist

== Achievements with results ==
=== BWF International Challenge/Series (3 titles, 3 runners-up) ===
Men's singles
Year	Tournament	Opponent	Score	Result
2016	Carebaco International	(Dominican Republic) Nelson Javier	17–21, 21–13, 7–21	(silver) Runner-up
2018	Carebaco International	(Luxembourg) Robert Mann	21–18, 12–21, 17–21	(silver) Runner-up

Men's doubles
Year	Tournament	Partner	Opponent	Score	Result
2023	Suriname International	(Suriname) Mitchel Wongsodikromo	(Suriname) Diego Dos Ramos (Suriname) Al-Hassan Somedjo	21–18, 21–9	(gold) Winner
2023	French Guiana International	(Suriname) Mitchel Wongsodikromo	(French Guiana) Dimitri Antony (French Guiana) Bons Vincent	21–9, 21–12	(gold) Winner
2024	Suriname International	(Suriname) Mitchel Wongsodikromo	(Suriname) Rivano Bisphan (Suriname) Danny Chen	21–14, 21–8	(gold) Winner

Mixed doubles
Year	Tournament	Partner	Opponent	Score	Result
2026	Suriname International	(Suriname) Crystal Leefmans	(Azerbaijan) Dicky Dwi Pangestu (Azerbaijan) Keisha Fatimah Azzahra	10–21, 16–21	(silver) Runner-up

BWF International Challenge tournament
BWF International Series tournament
BWF Future Series tournament

=== BWF Junior International (1 title, 1 runners-up) ===
Boys' singles
Year	Tournament	Opponent	Score	Result
2015	Carebaco Junior International	(Jamaica) Matthew Lee	21–7, 19–21, 21–6	(gold) Winner

Boys' doubles
Year	Tournament	Partner	Opponent	Score	Result
2015	Carebaco Junior International	(Suriname) Mitch Nai Chung Tong	(Dominican Republic) Cesar Adonis Brito González (Dominican Republic) Angel Argenis Marinez Ulloa	20–22, 17–21	(silver) Runner-up

BWF Junior International Grand Prix tournament
BWF Junior International Challenge tournament
BWF Junior International Series tournament
BWF Junior Future Series tournament

Olympic Games
Preceded by Chinyere Pigot	Flagbearer for Suriname; 2016 Rio Summer Olympics	Succeeded by Incumbent
