= Oscar Brandon =

Surinamese badminton player

Personal information
- Full name: Oscar Roël Brandon
- Born: August 8, 1971 (age 55) Paramaribo, Suriname
- Height: 182 cm (6 ft 0 in)
- Weight: 75 kg (165 lb)

Sport
- Country: Suriname
- Sport: Badminton
- Coached by: Ma Lefi & Otmar "Arti" Kersout
- Career record: 33 wins, 23 losses (men's singles), 23 wins, 26 losses (men's doubles), 24 wins, 16 losses (mixed doubles)
- Career titles: 3 international, 10 national singles
- Highest ranking: 62 (singles), 125 (doubles) (1998)
- BWF profile
- Updated on 12 August 2016

Oscar Roël Brandon (born 8 August 1971) is a Surinamese badminton player, coach and Olympic team manager. He competed for Suriname at the 1996 Summer Olympics as a badminton player in the Men's singles event. And he was "chef de mission" (team manager) for Suriname at the 2012 Summer Olympics in London and the 2016 Summer Olympics in Rio de Janeiro.

== Early years ==
At the age of six Oscar Brandon accompanied his dad to the badminton "Ismay van Wilgen sportshall" and when he turned 12 years old became a member of the SCVU (Sociaal Culturele Vereniging Uitvlugt) badminton club at the outskirts of the city of Paramaribo. There he nurtured his talent under guidance and supervision of trainer and coach "Ma Lefi". He quickly became a junior champ and was then soon included in the National Juniors Squad of Suriname for centralized training.

== Career ==
His first big international success came in 1988 as a junior player winning the Carebaco juniors event in boys singles. In 1990 he reached the semi-finals in Men's Singles at the 1990 CACSO Games in Mexico City. Unfortunately he lost the semi-final against experienced home player Ernesto de La Torre and then he lost the bronze medal match against Jamaican Robert Richards. After a short period of training and playing tournaments in the Netherlands, he decided to play a full year of badminton competition abroad in the Netherlands. There he was part of the famous BV van Zijderveld club in Amstelveen. He won a record of ten National Men's Singles titles, the first in 1991 and then was undisputed from 1993 till 2001. In 1996 he received a wildcard to participate at the 1996 Summer Olympics a first in badminton for Suriname. At the Atlanta Olympics he would also become the first Olympic torch bearer for his country, participating in the Olympic Torch Relay in Miami. In the Men's Singles event at the 1996 Summer Olympics he lost his first match against Jamie Dawson of Canada 5–15, 4–15. In 1998 he became "Sportsman of the Year" in Suriname after reaching the 62nd place on the badminton world ranking, by winning the first edition of the Suriname International and reaching the final of the Argentina International. That year 1998 he also won both the Argentina International and Brazil International São Paulo Cup 1998 in the mixed doubles event with Adrienn Kocsis a former Hungarian player playing for Peru. In 1999 Oscar Brandon participated in both the Pan Am Games and the World Championships, a first for his country Suriname. Once again in 1999 he was chosen to be "Sportsman of the Year" in Suriname. In 2001 he was crowned "Badminton player of the century" in his native Suriname.

== Achievements ==
=== 1985 ===
- Winner at the Carebaco Juniors Boys Doubles with Marlon Djojodiwongso of Suriname

=== 1988 ===
- Winner at the Carebaco Juniors Boys Singles
- Winner at the Carebaco Juniors Boys Doubles with Eric Bleau of Suriname
- Runner-Up at the Carebaco Juniors Mixed Doubles
- Most Valuable Player Juniors Carebaco 1988

=== 1989 ===
- Winner (Golden medal) at the Junior Carifta Games 1989 Boys Single
- Runner-Up (Silver medal) at the Junior Carifta Games 1989 Boys Doubles with Eric Bleau of Suriname
- Semi-Final (Bronze medal) at the Junior Carifta Games 1989 Mixed Doubles with Letitia Wongsodimedjo of Suriname

=== 1990 ===
- 4th Place at the 1990 CACSO Games Men's Singles

=== 1992 ===
- Winner at the Caribbean Easter Tournament Curacao Men's Singles
- Semi-Final at the Carebaco International Men's Singles
- Quarter-Final at the Carebaco International Men's Doubles with Veron Griffiths of Jamaica
- Quarter-Final at the Carebaco International Mixed Doubles with E. Hoeymaakers of Curacao

=== 1995 ===
- First round at the Pan Am Games Men's Singles

=== 1996 ===
- First round at the 1996 Summer Olympics Men's Singles

=== 1997 ===
- Quarter-Final at the Peru International Men's Singles and Men's Doubles with Alejandro Elias of Peru
- Semi-Final at the Carebaco International Men's Doubles with Eric Bleau of Suriname
- Quarter-Final at the Carebaco International Men's Singles
- Quarter-Final at the Guatemala International Men's Singles and Men's Doubles with Anil Seepaul of Trinidad and Tobago
- Semi-Final at the Guatemala International Mixed Doubles with Shackera Cupidon of Jamaica

=== 1998 ===
- Quarter-Final at the Peru International Men's Doubles with Pieter van Soerland of the Netherlands
- Quarter-Final at the Peru International Mixed Doubles with Nigella Saunders of Jamaica
- Runner-Up at the Carebaco International Mixed Doubles with Nathalie Haynes of Suriname
- Semi-Final at the Carebaco International Men's Singles and Men's Doubles with Derrick Stjeward of Suriname
- Winner at the Brazil International São Paulo Cup 1998 Mixed Doubles with Adrienn Kocsis of Peru
- Semi-Final at the Brazil International São Paulo Cup 1998 Men's Doubles with Leandro Santos of Brazil
- Runner-Up at the South American Badminton Championships Men's Doubles with Derrick Stjeward of Suriname
- Runner-Up at the Argentina International Men's Singles
- Winner at the Argentina International Mixed Doubles with Adrienn Kocsis of Peru
- Semi-Final at the Argentina International Men's Doubles with Jorge Meyer of Argentina
- Winner at the Suriname International Men's Singles
- Semi-Final at the Suriname International Men's Doubles with Derrick Stjeward of Suriname
- Quarter-Final at the Suriname International Mixed Doubles with Nathalie Haynes of Suriname

=== 1999 ===
- Qualification round at the 1999 IBF World Championships Men's Singles and Men's Doubles with Derrick Stjeward of Suriname
- First round at the Pan Am Games Men's Singles and Men's Doubles with Derrick Stjeward of Suriname
- Second round at the Pan Am Games Mixed Doubles with Nathalie Haynes of Suriname
- Quarter-Final at the Carebaco International Men's Singles and Men's Doubles with Derrick Stjeward of Suriname
- Semi-Final at the Jamaica International Mixed Doubles with Kristal Karjohn of Jamaica

=== 2001 ===
- Semi-Final at the Carebaco International Men's Singles

=== 2003 ===
- Semi-Final at the Suriname International Mixed Doubles with Stephanie Jadi of Suriname

=== 2008 ===
- Semi-Final at the Suriname International Men's Doubles with Jair Liew of Suriname

=== 2009 ===
- Runner-Up at the Suriname International Men's Doubles with Raul Rampersad of Trinidad and Tobago
- Semi-Final at the Suriname International Mixed Doubles with Danielle Melchiot of Suriname

=== 2013 ===
- Semi-Final at the Suriname International Mixed Doubles with Stephanie Jadi of Suriname

== Achievements with results ==
=== BWF International Challenge/Series ===
Men's singles
Year	Tournament	Opponent	Score	Result
1998	Suriname International	(Jamaica) Roy Paul Jnr	15-13, 12–15, 15–8	(gold) Winner
1998	Argentina International	(Wales) Richard Vaughan	1-15, 4–15	(silver) Runner-Up

Men's doubles
Year	Tournament	Partner	Opponent	Score	Result
2009	Suriname International	(Trinidad and Tobago) Raul Rampersad	(Suriname) Virgil Soeroredjo (Suriname) Mitchel Wongsodikromo	15–21, 16–21	(silver) Runner-up

Mixed doubles
Year	Tournament	Partner	Opponent	Score	Result
1998	Argentina International	(Peru) Adrienn Kocsis	(Mexico) Bernardo Monreal (Mexico) Gabriela Melgoza	15–6, 15-3	(gold) Winner
1998	Brazil International	(Peru) Adrienn Kocsis	(Mexico) Bernardo Monreal (Mexico) Gabriela Melgoza	15–4, 15-8	(gold) Winner
1998	Carebaco International	(Suriname) Nathalie Haynes	(Jamaica) Roy Paul Jnr (Jamaica) Terry Leyow	11–15, 6-15	(silver) Runner-up

BWF International Challenge tournament
BWF International Series tournament
BWF Future Series tournament

== Post-playing career ==
After his active career Oscar Brandon became a badminton coach, team manager and politician for his country. In November 1998 he was chosen as a member of the National Assembly, the Parliament, representing the legislative branch of government in Suriname. He is also a member of the Suriname Olympic Committee and took up the "chef de mission" (team manager) role for Suriname at the 2010 Central American and Caribbean Games, the 2010 Summer Youth Olympics, the 2010 South American Games, the 2012 Summer Olympics, the 2014 Central American and Caribbean Games, the 2014 South American Games, the 2014 Summer Youth Olympics, the 2015 Pan American Games and the 2016 Summer Olympics.

== Personal life ==
Oscar Brandon is married and the couple have a son Shawn, who occasionally also participated in the National Badminton Circuit of Suriname and was also selected as a junior international to participate in the Carebaco Games.
