= Mitchel Wongsodikromo =

Surinamese badminton player (born 1985)

Personal information
- Full name: Mitchel Arthur Wongsodikromo
- Born: August 26, 1985 (age 41) Paramaribo, Suriname
- Height: 172 cm (5.64 ft)
- Weight: 72 kg (159 lb)

Sport
- Country: Suriname
- Sport: Badminton
- Handedness: Right
- Coached by: Otmar Kersout

Men's Singles & Men's Doubles
- Highest ranking: 205 (MS 8 March 2012); 76 (MD 5 April 2012)
- Current ranking: 872 (MS 24 December 2019); 348 (MD 24 December 2019)
- BWF profile
Medal record
Men's Badminton
Representing Suriname
Central American and Caribbean Games
| Bronze medal – third place | 2002 San Salvador | Singles |
| Bronze medal – third place | 2010 Mayagüez | Men's Doubles |
South American Games
| Bronze medal – third place | 2010 Medellín | Mixed Doubles |
| Bronze medal – third place | 2010 Medellín | Mixed Team |

Mitchel Arthur Wongsodikromo (born 26 August 1985) is a Surinamese badminton player and coach. He competed for Suriname at three Pan Am Games: 2003 Pan American Games, 2007 Pan American Games & the 2011 Pan American Games. As a very young badminton player with the club T.N.F. (Tan Na Fesi) in Suriname, Wongsodikromo was an exceptional talent and won numerous juniors titles and was soon selected to represent his country abroad, winning several juniors medals at Caribbean, Central American and South American events. Much of his success was with his doubles partner Virgil Soeroredjo.

== Multiple Caribbean and Pan Am Juniors badminton championships ==
Together Wongsodikromo and Soeroredjo grew up to become a badminton force for Suriname in the Pan Am region. In 1997 Wongsodikromo participated in the Surinamese U-19 juniors team event winning a silver medal in Barbados. Also that year, Wongsodikromo became South American Boys Singles U-13 Champion and Boys Doubles U-15 Champion in São Paulo, Brazil, also winning a silver medal in Mixed Doubles U-17. In 1999 Wongsodikromo took gold in the Mixed Doubles U-19 and the Team Event U-19, and also silver in the Boys Singles & Boys Doubles U-19 categories at the Carebaco Games held in Suriname.

The year 2000 was a top year for Wongsodikromo; he participated in the IBF World Academy training camp held in Cape Town, South Africa. In 2000 Wongsodikromo won a gold medal in the Boys Singles U-15 category at the South American Juniors Championships in Argentina. At that same event, he also won a silver medal in the Boys Doubles U-15 category. In the same year, he and Soeroredjo won the Pan American Boys Doubles U-17 juniors title at Cuba after they had already won the Caribbean Boys Doubles titles U-17 and U-19 the same year at Barbados. At the 2000 Carebaco Games, Wongsodikromo won five gold medals, winning the triple in the U-19 category plus Boys Doubles in the U-17 category and the U-19 team event for Suriname.

In 2001 Wongsodikromo managed to successfully defend four of his five Carebaco juniors titles, only losing his singles U-19 title in Jamaica. In 2001 Wongsodikromo and Soeroredjo won Boys Doubles U-17 Gold at the South American Juniors Championships in Rio de Janeiro, Brazil. Wongsodikromo also took bronze at the Boys Singles U-17 event and bronze at the Mixed Doubles U-19 event. That year they also won the Regatas Cup for Boys Doubles U-17 in Lima, Peru. Wongsodikromo again also took two bronze medals in Peru at the Boys Singles U-17 and Mixed Doubles U-17.

In 2002 Wongsodikromo and Soeroredjo became Pan American Juniors Semi-Champions U-19 in Orange County, USA. At the same event, Wongsodikromo also took a bronze medal in the U-19 Mixed team event, where the Surinamese juniors team surprisingly beat favorites Canada, ending up in third place behind the USA and Peru, but beating out fourth-place Canada and fifth-place Brazil. In the 2002 Carebaco Games, Wongsodikromo won gold in the Men's Doubles U-19 and silver in the Men's Singles juniors categories in Puerto Rico. In the 2003 Carebaco Games in Trinidad and Tobago, Soeroredjo lost both the U-19 Boys Singles & Mixed Doubles finals to his compatriot Wongsodikromo, who took four gold medals at that event. Together they eventually won the Boys Doubles U-19 title and the Carebaco Juniors 2003 team event.

== International & national achievements ==
In 2002 Wongsodikromo and Soeroredjo both won a Men's Singles Bronze medal at the 2002 Central American and Caribbean Games (CACSO Games 2002) in San Salvador. At that time this was a special achievement since they were both still only 17-year-old juniors. In 2005 at the Carebaco Open Championships Wongsodikromo was part of the Surinamese team that won a bronze medal in the Caribbean Team Event held in Cuba.

Wongsodikromo gained five National Men's Singles titles in 2003, 2005, 2009, 2010 and 2012. Internationally, he was a three-time Men's Doubles champion at the Suriname International Badminton Tournament in 2008, 2009 and 2011. He also won the Mixed Doubles title two times at the Suriname International in 2009 and in 2012. In 2010 Wongsodikromo & Soeroredjo reached the final at the Bill Graham Miami International, and in 2011 they reached the semi-final of that same event. In 2011 Wongsodikromo won both the Suriname International and the Carebaco International in Men's Doubles. In March 2010 Wongsodikromo was also part of the Suriname badminton team that won a bronze medal in Mixed Teams at the 2010 South American Games in Medellín. With his compatriot Crystal Leefmans, Wongsodikromo won another bronze medal in the individual Mixed Doubles event. In July 2010 Wongsodikromo and Soeroredjo won the only medal, a bronze, for Suriname at the 2010 Central American and Caribbean Games by reaching the semi-finals. In 2012 Wongsodikromo was part of the first Suriname men's badminton team that participated at the Thomas Cup preliminaries in Los Angeles, USA.

=== National badminton titles ===
- 2024 – National Championships: Men's Doubles Gold
- 2023 – National Championships: Men's Doubles Gold
- 2019 – National Championships: Men's Doubles Gold & Mixed Doubles Silver
- 2018 – National Championships: Mitchel Wongsodikromo did not participate that year
- 2017 – National Championships: Men's Doubles Silver
- 2016 – National Championships: Mixed Doubles Gold
- 2014 – National Championships: Mixed Doubles Gold
- 2013 – National Championships: Mitchel Wongsodikromo did not participate that year
- 2012 – National Championships: Men's Singles Gold, Men's Doubles Gold & Mixed Doubles Gold
- 2011 – National Championships: Men's Singles Silver, & Men's Doubles Gold
- 2010 – National Championships: Men's Singles Gold, Men's Doubles Gold & Mixed Doubles Silver
- 2009 – National Championships: Men's Singles Gold, Men's Doubles Gold & Mixed Doubles Gold
- 2008 – National Championships: Men's Singles Silver, Men's Doubles Gold & Mixed Doubles Gold
- 2007 – National Championships: No National Championships held that year
- 2006 – National Championships: Men's Singles Silver, Men's Doubles Gold & Mixed Doubles Silver
- 2005 – National Championships: Men's Singles Gold, & Mixed Doubles Gold
- 2004 – National Championships: Men's Singles Silver &, Men's Doubles Gold & Mixed Doubles Gold
- 2003 – National Championships: Men's Singles Gold, Men's Doubles Gold & Mixed Doubles Gold
- 2002 – National Championships: No National Championships held that year
- 2001 – National Championships: Mixed Doubles Silver
- 2000 – National Championships: Men's Doubles Gold
- 1999 – National Championships: Men's Doubles Silver
- 1997 – Surinamese National Junior Badminton Championships: Boys' Singles & Boys' Doubles U-13, U-15, U-17 Gold & Mixed Doubles U-15 Gold
- 1996 – Surinamese National Junior Badminton Championships: Boys' Singles, Boys' Doubles & Mixed Doubles U-12 & U-14 Gold
- 1995 – Surinamese National Junior Badminton Championships: Boys' Singles, Boys' Doubles & Mixed Doubles U-12 & U-14 Gold
- 1994 – Surinamese National Junior Badminton Championships: Boys' Singles, Boys' Doubles & Mixed Doubles U-12 Gold & Boys' Singles U-14 Gold
- 1993 – Surinamese National Junior Badminton Championships: Boys' Singles & Boys' Doubles U-12 Gold

=== Surinamese national badminton circuit titles, A Class ===
- 2018 – 12e Boijmans Memorial Toernooi 2018: Men's Doubles Silver
- 2017 – 30ste Ma Lefi Toernooi 2017: Men's Doubles Gold & Mixed Doubles Silver
- 2017 – Lilian Bendter Toernooi 2017: Men's Doubles Gold & Mixed Doubles Gold
- 2015 – 3e KNTS Nieuwjaars-Badmintontoernooi 2015: Mixed Doubles Gold
- 2015 – 9e Gerard Boijmans Memorial Badminton Toernooi 2015: Men's Singles Gold
- 2015 – 19e Ro Caster Memorial Badminton Toernooi 2015: Men's Doubles Gold
- 2015 – 28e Ma Lefi Badminton Toernooi 2015: Men's Singles Gold & Mixed Doubles Silver
- 2014 – 8e Gerard Boijmans Memorial Badminton Toernooi 2015: Men's Singles Gold
- 2014 – 3rd Assuria International Easter Badminton Tournament 2014: Men's Singles Bronze
- 2013 – 7e Gerard Boijmans Memorial Badminton Toernooi 2015: Men's Singles Gold
- 2013 – 2e Nieuw Stenov Badminton Paastoernooi 2013: Mixed Doubles Gold
- 2013 – 26e Ma Lefi Badmintontoernooi 2013: Men's Singles Gold & Mixed Doubles Gold
- 2013 – 2e Top 8 Masters Badminton Invitatie Toernooi 2013: Men's Singles Gold
- 2013 – Lilian Bendter Memorial 2013 toernooi: Men's Doubles Silver

=== International badminton titles ===
- 1997 – Carebaco Juniors Championships: Team Event U-19 Silver
- 1997 – South American Juniors Championships: Boys Singles U-13 Gold, Boys Doubles U-15 Gold, Mixed Doubles U-19 Gold
- 1998 – Caribbean Easter Tournament Curaçao: Boys Doubles U-19 Silver
- 1998 – Carebaco Juniors Championships: Team Event U-19 Bronze
- 1999 – Caribbean Easter Tournament Curaçao: Boys Singles U-15 Gold, Boys Doubles U-15 Gold, Boys Doubles U-19 Bronze & Mixed Doubles U-15 Gold
- 1999 – Carebaco Juniors Championships: Boys Single U-19 Silver, Boys Doubles U-19 Silver, Mixed Doubles U-19 Gold, Team Event U-19 Gold
- 2000 – South American Juniors Championships: Boys Singles U-15 Gold & Boys Doubles U-15 Silver
- 2000 – Carebaco Juniors Championships: Boys Singles U-19 Gold, Boys Doubles U-17 & U-19 Gold & Mixed Doubles U-19 Gold & Team Event U-19 Gold
- 2000 – Pan Am Juniors Championships: Boys Singles U-17 Silver & Boys Doubles U-17 Gold
- 2001 – Regatas Peru Juniors Open: Boys Singles U-17 Bronze, Boys Doubles U-17 Gold, Mixed Doubles U-17 Bronze
- 2001 – Carebaco Juniors Championships: Boys Doubles U-17 & U-19 Gold, Mixed Doubles U-19 Gold & Team Event U-19 Gold
- 2001 – South American Juniors Championships: Boys Singles U-17 Bronze, Boys Doubles U-19 Gold, Mixed Doubles U-19 Gold
- 2002 – Pan Am Juniors Championships: Boys Doubles U-19 Silver & Team Event U-19 Bronze
- 2002 – Carebaco Juniors Championships: Boys Singles U-19 Silver & Boys Doubles U-19 Gold
- 2002 – CACSO Games El Salvador: Men's Singles Bronze Medal
- 2002 – Kembit Youth International Hoensbroek – Limburg, NL: Mixed Doubles U-19 Bronze
- 2003 – Carebaco Juniors Championships: Boys Singles U-19 Gold, Boys Doubles U-19 Gold, Mixed Doubles U-19 Gold, Team Event U-19 Gold, Team Event Seniors Bronze
- 2003 – 2003 PAN AM Games Santo Domingo: Participation
- 2005 – Carebaco Open Championships: Team Event Bronze
- 2006 – BC70 Veluwe Open Tournament Vaassen, NL: Men's Doubles Gold
- 2006 – BC Weesp Tournament, NL: Men's Doubles Gold
- 2007 – Carebaco Open Championships: Men's Doubles Bronze
- 2007 – 2007 PAN AM Games Rio de Janeiro: Participation
- 2008 – 2nd Suriname International: Men's Singles Silver, Men's Doubles Gold & Mixed Doubles Silver
- 2009 – 3rd Suriname International: Men's Doubles Gold & Mixed Doubles Gold
- 2010 – CACSO Games Mayagüez: Men's Doubles Bronze Medal
- 2010 – SOUTH AMERICAN Games Medellín: Mixed Doubles Bronze & Team Event Bronze
- 2010 – Bill Graham Miami International: Men's Doubles Silver
- 2010 – 4th Suriname International: Men's Doubles Silver & Mixed Doubles Silver
- 2011 – Cuba Giraldilla International: Men's Singles Bronze
- 2011 – Carebaco Open Championships: Men's Doubles Gold & Mixed Doubles Gold
- 2011 – 2011 PAN AM Games Guadalajara: Participation
- 2011 – Bill Graham Miami International: Men's Doubles Bronze
- 2011 – 5th Suriname International: Men's Doubles Gold
- 2012 – Thomas Cup Pan Am preliminaries: 1st Participation Surinamese Men's Team
- 2012 – Trilan Tournament Landgraaf, NL: Men's Singles Silver & Men's Doubles Bronze
- 2012 – Carebaco Open Championships: Men's Singles Bronze, Mixed Doubles Silver & Team Event Silver
- 2012 – Bill Graham Miami International: Men's Doubles Bronze & Mixed Doubles Silver
- 2012 – 6th Suriname International: Mixed Doubles Gold
- 2013 – 7th Suriname International: Mixed Doubles Silver
- 2014 – 8th Suriname International: Men's Doubles Silver
- 2015 – Jamaica International: Men's Doubles Bronze
- 2016 – 10th Suriname International: Men's Doubles Silver
- 2016 – 10th Suriname International: Mixed Doubles Bronze
- 2017 – 11th Suriname International: Men's Doubles Bronze
- 2018 – Carebaco Open Championships: Men's Doubles Bronze
- 2018 – 12th Suriname International: Mixed Doubles Silver
- 2019 – 13th Suriname International: Men's Doubles Gold

== Achievements with results ==
=== Central American and Caribbean Games ===
Men's singles
| Year | Venue | Opponent | Score | Result |
|---|---|---|---|---|
| 2002 | San Salvador, El Salvador | (Jamaica) Charles Pyne | 7–15, 7–15 | Bronze |

Men's doubles
| Year | Venue | Partner | Opponent | Score | Result |
|---|---|---|---|---|---|
| 2010 | Raymond Dalmau Coliseum, Porta del Sol; Mayagüez, Puerto Rico | (Suriname) Virgil Soeroredjo | (Mexico) Andrés López (Mexico) Lino Muñoz | 14–21, 17–21 | Bronze |

=== South American Games ===
Mixed doubles
| Year | Venue | Partner | Opponent | Score | Result |
|---|---|---|---|---|---|
| 2010 | Medellín, Colombia | (Suriname) Crystal Leefmans | (Brazil) Alex Yuwan Tjong (Brazil) Yasmin Cury | 24-22, 17-21, 12–21 | Bronze |

=== BWF International Series/ Future Series (12 titles, 12 runner-up) ===
Men's singles
| Year | Tournament | Opponent | Score | Result |
|---|---|---|---|---|
| 2008 | Suriname International | (Suriname) Virgil Soeroredjo | 21-10, 13-21, 10–21 | (silver) Runner-up |

Men's doubles
| Year | Tournament | Partner | Opponent | Score | Result |
|---|---|---|---|---|---|
| 2008 | Suriname International | (Suriname) Virgil Soeroredjo | (Suriname) Irfan Djabar (Suriname) Dylan Darmohoetomo | 21–15, 21–15 | (gold) Winner |
| 2009 | Suriname International | (Suriname) Virgil Soeroredjo | (Suriname) Oscar Brandon (Trinidad and Tobago) Raul Rampersad | 21–15, 21–16 | (gold) Winner |
| 2010 | Miami International | (Suriname) Virgil Soeroredjo | (United States) Sameera Gunatileka (United States) Vincent Nguy | 14–21, 17–21 | (silver) Runner-up |
| 2010 | Suriname International | (Suriname) Virgil Soeroredjo | (Guatemala) Kevin Cordón (Guatemala) Rodolfo Ramírez | 14–21, 16–21 | (silver) Runner-up |
| 2011 | Carebaco International | (Suriname) Virgil Soeroredjo | (Dominican Republic) Nelson Javier (Dominican Republic) Alberto Rapozo | 22-20, 21–18 | (gold) Winner |
| 2011 | Suriname International | (Suriname) Virgil Soeroredjo | (Brazil) Luíz dos Santos (Brazil) Alex Yuwan Tjong | 21-14, 21–17 | (gold) Winner |
| 2014 | Suriname International | (Suriname) Gilmar Jones | (Peru) Mario Cuba (Peru) Martin Del Valle | 11–21, 14–21 | (silver) Runner-up |
| 2016 | Suriname International | (Suriname) Alrick Toney | (Barbados) Corey Fanus (Barbados) Dakeil Thorpe | 16–21, 12–21 | (silver) Runner-up |
| 2019 | Suriname International | (Suriname) Danny Chen | (Barbados) Shae Michael Martin (Barbados) Gavin Robinson | 21-18, 21-15 | (gold) Winner |
| 2023 | Suriname International | (Suriname) Sören Opti | (Suriname) Diego Dos Ramos (Suriname) Al-Hassan Somedjo | 21–18, 21–9 | (gold) Winner |
| 2023 | French Guiana International | (Suriname) Sören Opti | (French Guiana) Dimitri Antony (French Guiana) Bons Vincent | 21–9, 21–12 | (gold) Winner |
| 2024 | Suriname International | (Suriname) Sören Opti | (Suriname) Rivano Bisphan (Suriname) Danny Chen | 21–14, 21–8 | (gold) Winner |

Mixed doubles
| Year | Tournament | Partner | Opponent | Score | Result |
|---|---|---|---|---|---|
| 2008 | Suriname International | (Suriname) Jill Sjauw Mook | (Suriname) Virgil Soeroredjo (Suriname) Nathalie Haynes | 16–21, 16–21 | (silver) Runner-up |
| 2009 | Suriname International | (Suriname) Priscille Tjitrodipo | (Suriname) Irfan Djabar (Suriname) Quennie Pawirosemito | 21–16, 21–15 | (gold) Winner |
| 2010 | Suriname International | (Suriname) Priscille Tjitrodipo | (Suriname) Virgil Soeroredjo (Suriname) Mireille van Daal | 8–21, 10–21 | (silver) Runner-up |
| 2011 | Carebaco International | (Suriname) Crystal Leefmans | (Jamaica) Gareth Henry (Jamaica) Geordine Henry | 21–17, 21–11 | (gold) Winner |
| 2011 | Suriname International | (Suriname) Crystal Leefmans | (Brazil) Hugo Arthuso (Brazil) Fabiana Silva | 20–22, 18–21 | (silver) Runner-up |
| 2012 | Carebaco International | (Suriname) Crystal Leefmans | (Dominican Republic) Nelson Javier (Dominican Republic) Berónica Vibieca | 21–11, 17–21, 13–21 | (silver) Runner-up |
| 2012 | Miami International | (Suriname) Crystal Leefmans | (France) Laurent Constantin (France) Andréa Vanderstukken | 21–23, 14–21 | (silver) Runner-up |
| 2012 | Suriname International | (Suriname) Crystal Leefmans | (Guatemala) Rubén Castellanos (Guatemala) Nikté Sotomayor | 21–12, 21-18 | (gold) Winner |
| 2013 | Suriname International | (Suriname) Crystal Leefmans | (Netherlands) Dave Khodabux (Netherlands) Elisa Piek | 17–21, 21–18, 19–21 | (silver) Runner-up |
| 2018 | Suriname International | (Jamaica) Katherine Wynter | (Dominican Republic) César Brito (Dominican Republic) Bermary Polanco | 10–21, 16–21 | (silver) Runner-up |
| 2023 | Suriname International | (French Guiana) Loriane Dréan | (Suriname) Rivano Bisphan (Suriname) Sion Zeegelaar | 21–18, 21–17 | (gold) Winner |

BWF International Challenge tournament
BWF International Series tournament
BWF Future Series tournament
