= Crystal Leefmans =

Surinamese badminton player

Personal information
- Born: 6 January 1995 (age 31)

Sport
- Country: Suriname
- Sport: Badminton
- Handedness: Right

Women's singles & doubles
- Highest ranking: 239 (WS 17 November 2011); 233 (WD 8 November 2012); 131 (XD 16 August 2012)
- BWF profile
Medal record
Women's badminton
Representing Suriname
South American Games
| Bronze medal – third place | 2010 Medellín | Mixed doubles |
| Bronze medal – third place | 2010 Medellín | Mixed team |

Crystal Leefmans (born 6 January 1995) is a Surinamese badminton player. In 2010, she won the bronze medals at the Medellín South American Games in the mixed doubles and team event. In 2011, she won the mixed doubles title at the Carebaco International tournament in the individuals event of the Carebaco Games partnered with Mitchel Wongsodikromo. Leefmans was also the champion at the Suriname International tournament in 2012 and 2013. In 2018 she won the mixed doubles Carebaco International title again at home, this time partnering compatriot Dylan Darmohoetomo. She was the flagbearer for Suriname at the 2011 Pan Am Games.

== Career ==
Crystal Leefmans, who originates from Badminton Club Lelydorp and switched to club TNF after moving to the capital city of Paramaribo, was voted Female Badminton Player of the year in Suriname in 2010, 2012, 2013, 2014 & 2015. After winning many National juniors titles, Crystal won her first of a total of five National Women's singles titles in 2009 at the Surinamese National Badminton Championships. She held on to her title in 2010, then lost it to Danielle Melchiot the following year, but regained her singles title in 2012 to lose it again to Melchiot the following year 2013. In 2014 she took her fourth singles title and defended this one successfully in 2015. Crystal Leefmans also holds nine National Women's doubles titles (2009, 2012, 2014, 2015, 2017, 2018, 2022, 2024 and 2026) and four National Mixed doubles titles (2010, 2012, 2014 & 2026). With these achievements she is holder of two National Triple crowns in 2012 and 2014.

== Achievements ==
=== South American Games ===
Mixed doubles
| Year | Venue | Partner | Opponent | Score | Result |
|---|---|---|---|---|---|
| 2010 | Plaza Mayor; Medellín, Colombia | (Suriname) Mitchel Wongsodikromo | (Brazil) Alex Tjong (Brazil) Yasmin Cury | 24–22, 17–21, 12–21 | Bronze |

=== BWF International Series/ Future Series (5 titles, 11 runner-up) ===
Women's singles
| Year | Tournament | Opponent | Score | Result |
|---|---|---|---|---|
| 2009 | Suriname International | (Suriname) Danielle Melchiot | 14–21, 21–18, 14–21 | (silver) Runner-up |
| 2012 | Suriname International | (Netherlands) Patty Stolzenbach | 6–21, 12–21 | (silver) Runner-up |

Women's doubles
| Year | Tournament | Partner | Opponent | Score | Result |
|---|---|---|---|---|---|
| 2008 | Suriname International | (Suriname) Quennie Pawirosentono | (Suriname) Nathalie Haynes (Suriname) Danielle Melchiot | 13–21, 19–21 | (silver) Runner-up |
| 2011 | Suriname International | (Suriname) Rugshaar Ishaak | (Turkey) Özge Bayrak (Turkey) Neslihan Yiğit | 3–21, 7–21 | (silver) Runner-up |
| 2012 | Miami International | (Suriname) Priscille Tjitrodipo | (France) Perrine Le Buhanic (France) Andréa Vanderstukken | 15–21, 5–21 | (silver) Runner-up |
| 2012 | Suriname International | (Suriname) Priscille Tjitrodipo | (Barbados) Mariama Eastmond (Barbados) Dionne Forde | Round robin | (gold) Winner |
| 2013 | Suriname International | (Suriname) Priscille Tjitrodipo | (Trinidad and Tobago) Virginia Chariandy (Trinidad and Tobago) Solángel Guzmán | 23–21, 21–16 | (gold) Winner |
| 2017 | Suriname International | (Suriname) Priscille Tjitrodipo | (Barbados) Monyata Riviera (Barbados) Tamisha Williams | 17–21, 17–21 | (silver) Runner-up |

Mixed doubles
| Year | Tournament | Partner | Opponent | Score | Result |
|---|---|---|---|---|---|
| 2011 | Carebaco International | (Suriname) Mitchel Wongsodikromo | (Jamaica) Gareth Henry (Jamaica) Geordine Henry | 21–17, 21–11 | (gold) Winner |
| 2011 | Suriname International | (Suriname) Mitchel Wongsodikromo | (Brazil) Hugo Arthuso (Brazil) Fabiana Silva | 20–22, 18–21 | (silver) Runner-up |
| 2012 | Carebaco International | (Suriname) Mitchel Wongsodikromo | (Dominican Republic) Nelson Javier (Dominican Republic) Berónica Vibieca | 21–11, 17–21, 13–21 | (silver) Runner-up |
| 2012 | Miami International | (Suriname) Mitchel Wongsodikromo | (France) Laurent Constantin (France) Andréa Vanderstukken | 21–23, 14–21 | (silver) Runner-up |
| 2012 | Suriname International | (Suriname) Mitchel Wongsodikromo | (Guatemala) Rubén Castellanos (Guatemala) Nikté Sotomayor | 21–12, 21-18 | (gold) Winner |
| 2013 | Suriname International | (Suriname) Mitchel Wongsodikromo | (Netherlands) Dave Khodabux (Netherlands) Elisa Piek | 17–21, 21–18, 19–21 | (silver) Runner-up |
| 2018 | Carebaco International | (Suriname) Dylan Darmohoetomo | (Barbados) Dakeil Thorpe (Barbados) Tamisha Williams | 22–20, 18–21, 21–19 | (gold) Winner |
| 2026 | Suriname International | (Suriname) Sören Opti | (Azerbaijan) Dicky Dwi Pangestu (Azerbaijan) Keisha Fatimah Azzahra | 10–21, 16–21 | (silver) Runner-up |

BWF International Challenge tournament
BWF International Series tournament
BWF Future Series tournament

=== National badminton titles ===
- 2026 - National Championships : Mixed Doubles Gold
- 2026 - National Championships : Women Doubles Gold
- 2025 - National Championships : Women Doubles Bronze
- 2024 - National Championships : Women Doubles Gold
- 2024 - National Championships : Women Doubles Bronze
- 2022 - National Championships : Women Doubles Gold
- 2022 - National Championships : Mixed Doubles Silver
- 2018 - National Championships : Women Doubles Gold
- 2017 - National Championships : Women Doubles Gold
- 2017 - National Championships : Mixed Doubles Silver
- 2015 - National Championships : Women Singles Gold
- 2015 - National Championships : Women Doubles Gold
- 2014 - National Championships : Women Singles Gold
- 2014 - National Championships : Women Doubles Gold
- 2014 - National Championships : Mixed Doubles Gold
- 2012 - National Championships : Women Singles Gold
- 2012 - National Championships : Women Doubles Gold
- 2012 - National Championships : Mixed Doubles Gold
- 2010 - National Championships : Women Singles Gold
- 2010 - National Championships : Women Doubles Gold
- 2010 - National Championships : Mixed Doubles Gold
- 2009 - National Championships : Women Singles Gold
- 2009 - National Championships : Women Doubles Gold
- 2008 - National Championships : Women Singles Silver
- 2008 - National Championships : Women Doubles Bronze
- 2009 - Surinamese National Junior Badminton Championships Girls Singles U15 Gold
- 2009 - Surinamese National Junior Badminton Championships Girls Doubles U15 Gold
- 2009 - Surinamese National Junior Badminton Championships Mixed Doubles U15 Gold
- 2009 - Surinamese National Junior Badminton Championships Girls Singles U19 Gold
- 2009 - Surinamese National Junior Badminton Championships Girls Doubles U19 Gold
- 2009 - Surinamese National Junior Badminton Championships Mixed Doubles U19 Bronze
- 2008 - Surinamese National Junior Badminton Championships Girls Singles U15 Silver
- 2008 - Surinamese National Junior Badminton Championships Girls Doubles U15 Gold
- 2008 - Surinamese National Junior Badminton Championships Mixed Doubles U15 Gold
- 2008 - Surinamese National Junior Badminton Championships Girls Doubles U19 Silver
- 2008 - Surinamese National Junior Badminton Championships Mixed Doubles U19 Silver
