= Virgil Soeroredjo =

Surinamese badminton player (born 1985)

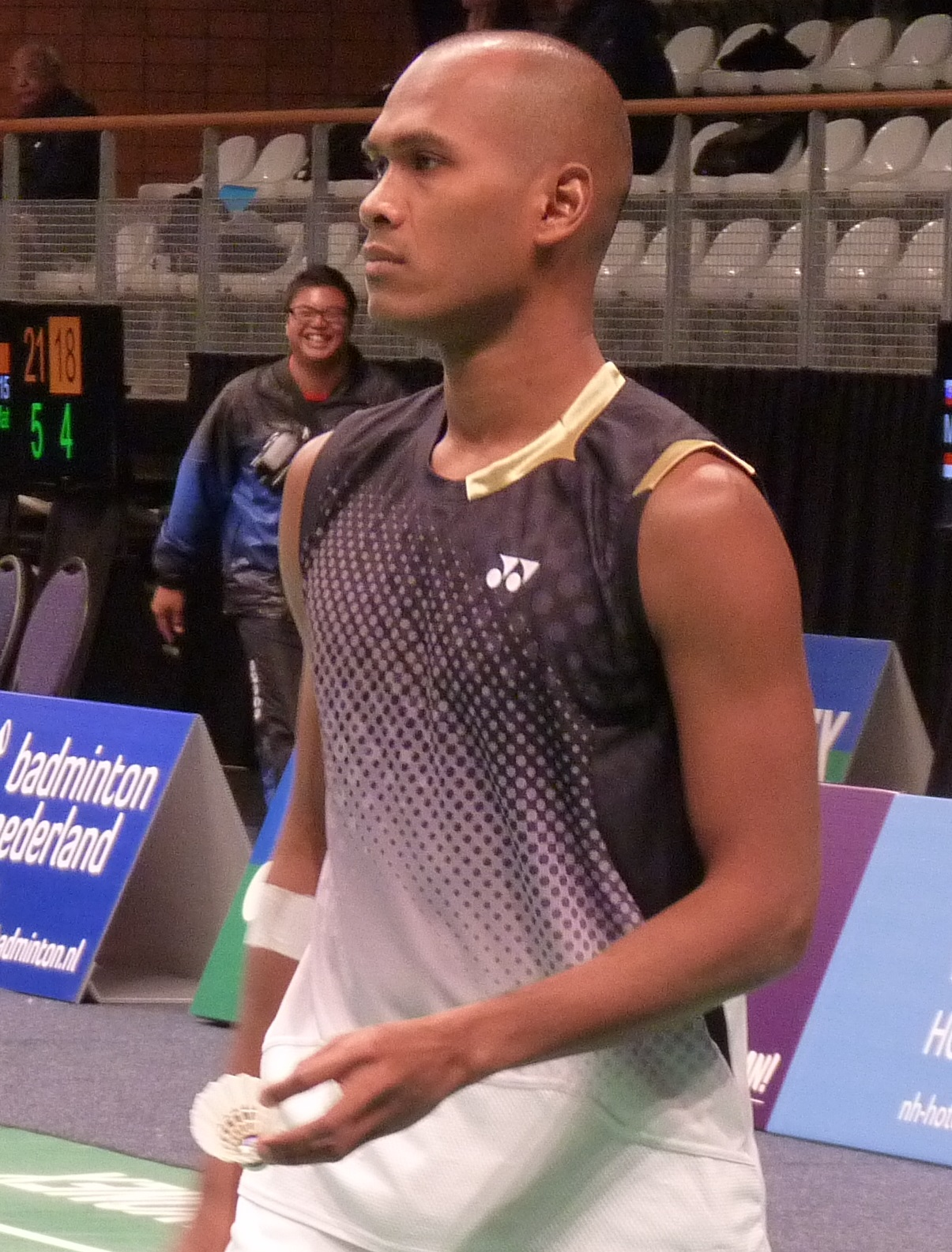

Personal information
- Born: 11 March 1985 (age 41) Paramaribo, Suriname
- Height: 175 cm (5 ft 9 in)
- Weight: 72 kg (159 lb)

Sport
- Country: Suriname
- Sport: Badminton
- Handedness: Right
- Coached by: Mike van Daal / Henk Brunings / Oscar Brandon

Men's Singles Men's Doubles Mixed Doubles
- Career titles: Singles Champion of Suriname 2004, 2006, 2008, 2011, 2013 & 2014 Doubles Champion of Suriname 2000, 2005, 2006, 2008, 2011 & 2013, Mixed Doubles Champion of Suriname 2000, 2006 & 2011 Surinam International 2008 Winner Men's Singles, Men's Doubles, Mixed Doubles SI 2009 Winner Men's Singles, Men's Doubles SI 2010 Winner Mixed Doubles SI 2011 Winner Men's Doubles Carebaco International 2011 Winner Men's Doubles
- Highest ranking: 175 (MS) 16 August 2012; 76 (MD) (5 April 2012)
- BWF profile
Medal record
Men's badminton
Representing Suriname
Central American and Caribbean Games
Bronze medal – third place	2002 San Salvador	Men's singles
Bronze medal – third place	2010 Mayaguez	Men's doubles
South American Games
Bronze medal – third place	2010 Medellín	Mixed team

Virgil Soeroredjo (born 11 March 1985) is a former Surinamese badminton player and now coach. He competed for Suriname at the 2012 Summer Olympics. He also competed for Suriname at 3 Pan Am Games: 2003, the 2007 & 2011. As a young badminton player with the club SCVU in Suriname, Soeroredjo won juniors titles and was selected to represent his country abroad, winning several juniors medals at Caribbean, Central American and South American events. Much of his success was with his doubles partner Mitchel Wongsodikromo.

== Multiple Caribbean and Pan Am Juniors badminton championships ==
Together Soeroredjo and Wongsodikromo won the Pan Am Boys Doubles U-17 juniors title at Cuba after they won the Caribbean Boys Doubles titles U-17 & U-19 the same year at Barbados. At the 2000 Carebaco Games, Soeroredjo won five gold medals and a silver medal, winning the triple in the U-17 category plus Boys Doubles in the U-19 category and the U-19 team event for Suriname and second place in Mixed Doubles U-19. In 2001, Soeroredjo successfully defended four of his five Carebaco juniors titles, only losing his singles U-17 title in the final at Jamaica. In 2001 Soeroredjo & Wongsodikromo won Boys Doubles U-17 gold at the South American Juniors Championships in Rio de Janeiro, Brazil. That year they also won the Regatas Cup for Boys Doubles U-17 in Lima, Peru. In 2002, Soeroredjo & Wongsodikromo became Pan American Juniors Semi-Champions U-19 in Orange County, USA. At the same event, Soeroredjo also took two bronze medals, one in the U-19 Mixed Doubles category and also in the team event, where the Surinamese juniors team beat favorites Canada. In the 2002 Carebaco Games, Soeroredjo won gold in the Men's Singles and the Men's Doubles U-19 juniors categories at Puerto Rico. Together with compatriot Carolyn Davids he participated in the Pan American IBF World Academy training camp held in Lima, Peru in 2002. In the 2003 Carebaco Games at Trinidad and Tobago, Soeroredjo lost both the U-19 Boys Singles & Mixed Doubles finals to his compatriot Wongsodikromo. Together, they won the Boys Doubles U-19 title and the Carebaco Juniors 2003 team event.

== International and national achievements ==
In 2002, they both won a Men's Singles bronze medal at the 2002 Central American and Caribbean Games (CACSO Games 2002) in San Salvador. In 2003 Soeroredjo was part of the first Surinamese badminton team that participated at the Sudirman Cup Mixed Teams World Championships in Eindhoven, the Netherlands. In 2005 at the Carebaco Open Championships held in Cuba, Soeroredjo managed to reach the semi-finals in Men's Singles, achieving a bronze medal for that as well as in the Team Event.

Soeroredjo won six National Men's Singles titles in 2004, 2006, 2008, 2011, 2013 & 2014. Internationally he was a triple champion at the Suriname International in 2008 winning all three categories in Men's Singles, Men's Doubles and Mixed Doubles. In 2009, he won the Men's Singles and Men's Doubles titles at the Suriname International, in 2010 he won the Mixed Doubles title and in 2011, he won the Men's Doubles title at the Suriname International.

In 2010, Soeroredjo & Wongsodikromo reached the final at the Bill Graham Miami International and in 2011 they reached the semi-final of that same event. In 2011, Soeroredjo won both the Suriname International and the Carebaco International in Men's Doubles. In March 2010 Soeroredjo was also part of the Suriname badminton team that won a bronze medal in Mixed Teams at the 2010 South American Games in Medellín. In July 2010, Soeroredjo & Wongsodikromo won the only medal, a bronze, for Suriname at the 2010 Central American and Caribbean Games by reaching the semi-finals. In 2012 Soeroredjo was part of the first Suriname Men's badminton team that participated at the Thomas Cup preliminaries in Los Angeles, USA.

In 2009, Soeroredjo moved to the Netherlands, training under coach Mike van Daal. He participated at the highest badminton club competition level, the Eredivisie, for BC Culemborg and BV van Zijderveld. At that time Soeroredjo started turning his focus to his sports management studies at the Johan Cruyff University in Amsterdam. From 2012, the Surinamese national badminton association, Surinaamse Badminton Bond, had been organizing an annual Top 8 Singles event in honor of Soeroredjo's participation at the 2012 London Olympics. Soeroredjo was planning on attending the 2013 event in his home country held by the badminton club of Nieuw Stenov, but unfortunately could not due to his busy study schedule.

In November 2013, Soeroredjo attended the National Championships and 7th Suriname International in Paramaribo. In April 2014, he won the 3rd Assuria International Easter Badminton Tournament 2014 in Paramaribo, beating young Jamaican talent Samuel Ricketts in the final. In November 2014, Soeroredjo attended the National Championships and 8th Suriname International in Paramaribo. Due to a recurring knee injury, Soeroredjo decided to retire as an international player in December 2015. He then went on to successfully complete the BWF Level 1 and Level 2 Badminton Coaches courses.

=== National badminton titles ===
- 1999 - National Championships: Men's Doubles Silver
- 2000 - National Championships: Men's Singles Silver, Men's Doubles Silver & Mixed Doubles Gold
- 2001 - National Championships: Men's Doubles Gold
- 2003 - National Championships: Men's Singles Silver
- 2004 - National Championships: Men's Singles Gold & Mixed Doubles Silver
- 2005 - National Championships: Men's Singles Silver, Men's Doubles Gold & Mixed Doubles Silver
- 2006 - National Championships: Men's Singles Gold, Men's Doubles Gold & Mixed Doubles Gold
- 2008 - National Championships: Men's Singles Gold, Men's Doubles Gold & Mixed Doubles Silver
- 2011 - National Championships: Men's Singles Gold, Men's Doubles Gold & Mixed Doubles Gold
- 2013 - National Championships: Men's Singles Gold, Men's Doubles Gold & Mixed Doubles Silver
- 2014 - National Championships: Men's Singles Gold, Men's Doubles Silver

=== International badminton titles ===
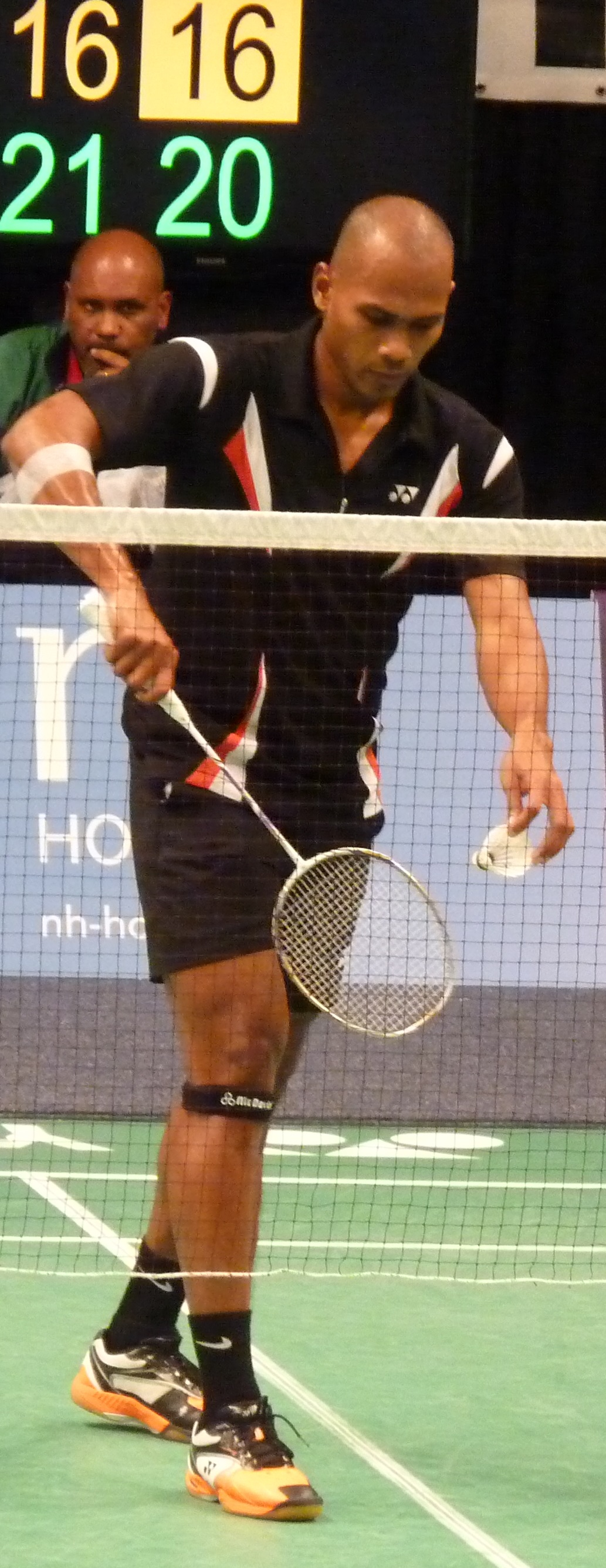
Virgil Soeroredjo (SUR) 2008 & 2009 Suriname International Men's Singles winner

- 1999 - Caribbean Easter Tournament Curaçao: Boys Singles U-15 Silver, Boys Doubles U-15 Gold, Boys Doubles U-19 Bronze & Mixed Doubles U-15 Bronze
- 1999 - Carebaco Juniors Championships: Boys Doubles U-19 Bronze, Team Event U-19 Gold
- 2000 - South American Juniors Championships: Boys Singles U-15 Silver, Boys Doubles U-15 Silver
- 2000 - Caribbean Easter Tournament Curaçao: Boys Singles U-15 Silver, Boys Doubles U-15 Gold, Mixed Doubles U-15 Bronze & Boys Doubles U-19 Bronze
- 2000 - Carebaco Juniors Championships: Boys Singles U-17 Gold, Boys Doubles U-17 Gold & Mixed Doubles U-17 Gold, Mixed Doubles U-19 Silver, Team Event U-19 Gold
- 2000 - Pan Am Juniors Championships: Boys Doubles U-17 Gold, Mixed Doubles U-17 Silver
- 2001 - Carebaco Juniors Championships: Boys Singles U-17 Silver, Boys Doubles & Mixed Doubles U-17 Gold, Mixed Doubles U-19 Gold & Team Event U-19 Gold
- 2001 - Regatas Peru Juniors Open: Boys Singles U-17 Bronze, Boys Doubles U-17 Gold, Mixed Doubles U-17 Bronze
- 2002 - Carebaco Juniors Championships: Boys Singles U-19 Gold & Boys Doubles U-19 Gold
- 2002 - Pan Am Juniors Championships: Boys Doubles U-19 Silver, Mixed Doubles U-19 Bronze & Team Event U-19 Bronze
- 2002 - CACSO Games El Salvador: Men's Singles Bronze Medal
- 2003 - 2003 PAN AM Games Santo Domingo: Participation
- 2003 - Carebaco Juniors Championships: Boys Singles U-19 Silver, Boys Doubles U-19 Gold, Mixed Doubles U-19 Silver, Team Event U-19 Gold, Team Event Seniors Bronze
- 2003 - Sudirman Cup World Championship: 1st Participation Surinamese Mixed Team
- 2005 - Carebaco International Open Championships: Men's Singles Bronze
- 2006 - BC70 Veluwe Open Tournament Vaassen, NL: Men's Singles Gold & Men's Doubles Gold
- 2006 - BC Weesp Tournament, NL: Men's Singles Bronze & Men's Doubles Bronze
- 2007 - Carebaco International Open Championships: Men's Doubles Bronze
- 2007 - Racketeers Tournament Jamaica: Men's Singles A Silver & Men's Doubles A Silver
- 2007 - 2007 PAN AM Games Rio de Janeiro: Participation
- 2008 - 2nd Suriname International: Men's Singles Gold, Men's Doubles Gold & Mixed Doubles Gold
- 2009 - BC70 Veluwe Dauwtrappers Tournament Vaassen, NL: Men's Singles Gold
- 2009 - BC70 Veluwe Open Tournament Vaassen, NL: Men's Singles Gold
- 2009 - Open Alphense Tournament, NL: Men's Singles Gold
- 2009 - 3rd Suriname International: Men's Singles Gold & Men's Doubles Gold
- 2010 - AMOR Tournament Groningen, NL: Men's Singles Silver
- 2010 - CACSO Games Mayaguez: Men's Doubles Bronze Medal
- 2010 - SOUTH AMERICAN GAMES Medellin: Team Event Bronze
- 2010 - Bill Graham Miami International: Men's Doubles Silver
- 2010 - 4th Suriname International: Men's Doubles Silver & Mixed Doubles Gold
- 2011 - Carebaco International Open Championships: Men's Doubles Gold
- 2011 - 2011 PAN AM Games Guadalajara: Participation
- 2011 - Bill Graham Miami International: Men's Doubles Bronze
- 2011 - 5th Suriname International: Men's Doubles Gold
- 2012 - Thomas Cup Pan Am preliminaries: 1st Participation Surinamese Men's Team
- 2012 - 2012 London OLYMPIC GAMES: 2nd Surinamese Badminton Player to participate at the Olympic Games after Oscar Brandon
- 2013 - 7th Suriname International: Men's Doubles Bronze
- 2014 - Carlton GT1 Master toernooi Almere 2014, NL: Men's Singles Bronze
- 2014 - 3rd Assuria International Easter Badminton Tournament 2014, SUR: Men's Singles Gold
- 2014 - Phytalis Drop Shot Grand Prix Toernooi 2014, NL: Men's Singles Bronze
- 2014 - 8th Suriname International: Men's Singles Bronze

== Achievements with results ==
=== Central American and Caribbean Games ===
Men's singles
Year	Venue	Opponent	Score	Result
2002	San Salvador, El Salvador	(Guatemala) Pedro Yang	3–15, 0–15	Bronze

Men's doubles
Year	Venue	Partner	Opponent	Score	Result
2010	Raymond Dalmau Coliseum, Porta del Sol; Mayagüez, Puerto Rico	(Suriname) Mitchel Wongsodikromo	(Mexico) Andrés López (Mexico) Lino Muñoz	14–21, 17–21	Bronze

=== BWF International Series/ Future Series ===
Men's singles
Year	Tournament	Opponent	Score	Result
2009	Suriname International	(Brazil) Daniel Paiola	21-19, 21–13	(gold) Winner
2008	Suriname International	(Suriname) Mitchel Wongsodikromo	10-21, 21–13, 21–10	(gold) Winner

Men's doubles
Year	Tournament	Partner	Opponent	Score	Result
2011	Suriname International	(Suriname) Mitchel Wongsodikromo	(Brazil) Luis Henrique Dos Santos Jr. (Brazil) Alex Yuwan Tjong	21-14, 21–17	(gold) Winner
2011	Carebaco International	(Suriname) Mitchel Wongsodikromo	(Dominican Republic) Nelson Javier (Dominican Republic) Alberto Rapozo	22-20, 21–18	(gold) Winner
2010	Suriname International	(Suriname) Mitchel Wongsodikromo	(Guatemala) Kevin Cordón (Guatemala) Rodolfo Ramírez	14–21, 16–21	(silver) Runner-up
2010	Miami International	(Suriname) Mitchel Wongsodikromo	(United States) Sameera Gunatileka (United States) Vincent Nguy	14–21, 17–21	(silver) Runner-up
2009	Suriname International	(Suriname) Mitchel Wongsodikromo	(Suriname) Oscar Brandon (Trinidad and Tobago) Raul Rampersad	21–15, 21–16	(gold) Winner
2008	Suriname International	(Suriname) Mitchel Wongsodikromo	(Suriname) Irfan Djabar (Suriname) Dylan Darmohoetomo	21–15, 21–15	(gold) Winner

Mixed doubles
Year	Tournament	Partner	Opponent	Score	Result
2010	Suriname International	(Suriname) Mireille van Daal	(Suriname) Mitchel Wongsodikromo (Suriname) Priscille Tjitrodipo	21-8, 21-10	(gold) Winner
2008	Suriname International	(Suriname) Nathalie Haynes	(Suriname) Mitchel Wongsodikromo (Suriname) Jill Sjauw Mook	21-16, 21-16	(gold) Winner

BWF International Challenge tournament
BWF International Series tournament
BWF Future Series tournament

== Personal life ==
Soeroredjo and his wife Willeke have two daughters and lives in Zeeland, the Netherlands. Soeroredjo graduated in 2018 in sports marketing from the Johan Cruijff University in the Netherlands, and was trainer/coach at the Dutch premier division club The Flying Shuttle Barendrecht during the 2018/2019 season.
