= Gilmar Jones =

Surinamese badminton player and coach

Personal information
- Born: January 21, 1986 (age 40)

Sport
- Country: Suriname
- Sport: Badminton
- Handedness: Right

Men's singles & doubles
- Highest ranking: 535 (MS 24 November 2016); 261 (MD 1 December 2016); 370 (XD 19 January 2017)
- Current ranking: 539 (MD) (7 May 2024)
- BWF profile

Gilmar Jones (born 21 January 1986) is a Surinamese badminton player and national coach of the Surinamese badminton team. In 2015 and 2017, he became the champion in men's doubles event at the Surinamese National Badminton Championships. He is a four times National mixed doubles champion of Suriname. He first won the mixed doubles title in 2017 with Priscille Tjitrodipo, and retained the National Surinamese title the following two years with different partners in 2018 with Rugshaar Ishaak and in 2019 with Anjali Paragsingh. After the two covid years 2020 & 2021 without a National championship, he took his fourth National mixed doubles title with Chan Chan Yang in 2022.

His biggest international achievement to date is winning the Caribbean title in men's doubles with Dylan Darmohoetomo in 2016 at the Carebaco International in Aruba. Together with doubles partner Dylan Darmohoetomo he also reached the finals of the Carebaco International in 2018 held in his home town Paramaribo. Beginning of 2018 Gilmar Jones was appointed the head-coach of the National badminton team of Suriname. In 2023 he took a bronze medal in the mens doubles event at the Suriname International with Dion Sjauw Mook.

== Achievements ==
=== BWF International Challenge/Series ===
Men's doubles
Year	Tournament	Partner	Opponent	Score	Result
2014	Suriname International	(Suriname) Mitchel Wongsodikromo	(Peru) Mario Cuba (Peru) Martín del Valle	11–21, 14–21	(silver) Runner-up
2016	Carebaco International	(Suriname) Dylan Darmohoetomo	(Dominican Republic) Therry Aquino (Dominican Republic) Reimi Starling Cabrera Rosario	21–18, 21–15	(gold) Winner
2018	Carebaco International	(Suriname) Dylan Darmohoetomo	(Barbados) Dakeil Thorpe (Barbados) Shae Martin	19–21, 21–18, 16–21	(silver) Runner-up

BWF International Challenge tournament
BWF International Series tournament
BWF Future Series tournament
