= Jamaican National Badminton Championships =

Jamaican National Badminton Championships are officially held since the year 1937. After the first edition the tournament paused for 13 years.

== Past winners ==
Year	Men's singles	Women's singles	Men's doubles	Women's doubles	Mixed doubles
1937	Alan Ritchie	Mrs. Clayton			
1950					
1951					
1952					
1953	Jim Leslie				
1954	Jim Leslie				
1955	Jim Leslie	Barbara Tai Tenn Quee			
1956		Barbara Tai Tenn Quee			
1957		Barbara Tai Tenn Quee			
1958		Barbara Tai Tenn Quee		Barbara Tai Tenn Quee	Barbara Tai Tenn Quee
1959		Barbara Tai Tenn Quee			
1960	Brendan Clear	Barbara Tai Tenn Quee		Barbara Tai Tenn Quee	Barbara Tai Tenn Quee
1961	Richard Roberts	Barbara Tai Tenn Quee			
1962		Barbara Tai Tenn Quee		Barbara Tai Tenn Quee	Barbara Tai Tenn Quee
1963	Keith Palmer				
1964	Richard Roberts	Barbara Tai Tenn Quee	Anthony Garcia; Richard Roberts	Barbara Tai Tenn Quee; Sheila Phillips	
1965	Keith Palmer	Barbara Tai Tenn Quee	Anthony Garcia; Richard Roberts		Keith Palmer; Barbara Tai Tenn Quee
1966	Anthony Garcia	Pauline Laman	Anthony Garcia; Richard Roberts	Barbara Tai Tenn Quee; Sheila Phillips	Richard Roberts; Chris Bennett
1967	Anthony Garcia	Barbara Tai Tenn Quee	Keith Palmer; Douglas Bennett	Barbara Tai Tenn Quee; Sheila Phillips	Keith Palmer; Barbara Tai Tenn Quee
1968	Anthony Garcia	Pauline Laman	Anthony Garcia; Richard Roberts	Barbara Tai Tenn Quee; Margaret Parslow	Anthony Garcia; Barbara Tai Tenn Quee
1969	Keith Palmer	Pauline Laman	Keith Palmer; Geoffrey Haddad	Jennifer Haddad; Beverley Haddad	Keith Palmer; Pauline Laman
1970	Keith Palmer	Jennifer Haddad	Keith Palmer; Geoff Atkinson	Barbara Tai Tenn Quee; Lai Jean Chin	Keith Palmer; Chris Bennett
1971	Keith Palmer	Margaret Parslow	Anthony Garcia; Richard Roberts	Jennifer Haddad; Joan Lyn	Anthony Garcia; Norma Haddad
1972	Keith Palmer	Margaret Parslow	Keith Palmer; Richard Wong	Jennifer Haddad; Joan Lyn	Keith Palmer; Chris Bennett
1973	Keith Palmer	Jennifer Haddad	Richard Roberts; Anthony Garcia	Jennifer Haddad; Norma Haddad	Richard Wong; Margaret Parslow
1974	Trevor Stewart		Richard Roberts; Anthony Garcia		
1975	Richard Wong				
1976	Richard Wong	Jennifer Haddad			
1977		Jennifer Haddad			George Hugh; Marie Leyow
1978					
1979	George Hugh				
1980	George Hugh	Annette Leyow	George Hugh; Sammy Leyow	Carol Leyow; Marie Leyow	George Hugh; Marie Leyow
1981	Robert Richards				
1982	Garth King				
1983	Robert Richards				
1984	Robert Richards				
1985					
1986	Garth King	Deborah Binns	Garth King; Robert Richards	Carol Leyow Jones; Marie Leyow	Garth King; Carol Leyow Jones
1987	Robert Richards				
1988	Garth King				
1989	Robert Richards				
1990	Robert Richards				
1991	Robert Richards				
1992	Robert Richards				
1993	Roy Paul Jr.				
1994	Roy Paul Jr.				
1995	Robert Richards				
1996	Garth Walker				
1997	Robert Richards				
1998	Robert Richards				
1999	Robert Richards				
2000	Roy Paul Jr.				
2001	Charles Pyne	Nigella Saunders	Bradley Graham; Charles Pyne	Nigella Saunders (with partner)	Charles Pyne; Nigella Saunders
2002	Bradley Graham	Nigella Saunders	Bradley Graham; Albert Myles	Nigella Saunders; Terry Leyow Walker	Bradley Graham; Nigella Saunders
2003	Bradley Graham	Nigella Saunders	Bradley Graham; Albert Myles		Bradley Graham; Nigella Saunders
2004	Bradley Graham	Shenelle Peart			
2005	Bradley Graham	Nigella Saunders	Charles Pyne; Vishwanauth Tolan	Nigella Saunders; Alya Lewis	Bradley Graham; Nigella Saunders
2006	Bradley Graham	Nigella Saunders	Charles Pyne; Vishwanauth Tolan	Nigella Saunders; Alya Lewis	Bradley Graham; Nigella Saunders
2007	Charles Pyne	Nigella Saunders	Charles Pyne; Emelio Mendez	Nigella Saunders; Alya Lewis	Garron Palmer; Tracy Morgan
2008	Gareth Henry	Nigella Saunders	Vijay Myles; Willroy Myles	Nigella Saunders; Geordine Henry	Gareth Henry; Geordine Henry
2009	Charles Pyne	Nigella Saunders	Daniel Thompson; Gareth Henry	Nigella Saunders; Debra O'Connor	Daniel Thompson; Mikaylia Haldane
2010	Charles Pyne	Alya Lewis	Garron Palmer; Gareth Henry	Kristal Karjohn; Christine Leyow-Mayne	Charles Pyne; Christine Leyow-Mayne
2011	Bradley Graham	Debra O'Connor	Garron Palmer; Gerald Isaacs	Alya Lewis; Christine Leyow-Mayne	Bradley Graham; Alya Lewis
2012	Gareth Henry	Katherine Wynter	Garron Palmer; Gareth Henry	Debra O'Connor; Christine Leyow-Mayne	Gareth Henry; Geordine Henry
2013	Gareth Henry	Geordine Henry	Garron Palmer; Gareth Henry	Katherine Wynter; Ruth Williams	Gareth Henry; Geordine Henry
2014	Gareth Henry	Katherine Wynter	Garron Palmer; Gareth Henry	no competition	Gareth Henry; Geordine Henry
2015	Gareth Henry	Katherine Wynter	Anthony McNee; Dennis Coke	Debra O'Connor; Christine Leyow-Mayne	Gareth Henry; Geordine Henry
2016	Dennis Coke	Katherine Wynter	Anthony McNee; Dennis Coke	Katherine Wynter; Mikaylia Haldane	Gareth Henry; Geordine Henry

== Junior champions ==
Year	Men's singles	Women's singles	Men's doubles	Women's doubles	Mixed doubles
1983	Jimmy Chang	Camile Lue	Jimmy Chang / Nicholas Wiltshire	Camile Lue / Felice Yap	Jimmy Chang / Camile Lue
1995	Bradley Graham	Nigella Saunders			Bradley Graham / Nigella Saunders
1996	Bradley Graham	Nigella Saunders			Bradley Graham / Nigella Saunders
1997	Bradley Graham	Nigella Saunders			Bradley Graham / Nigella Saunders
1998		Nigella Saunders			
2005	Vishwanauth Tolan	Shenelle Peart	Vishwanauth Tolan / Kyle Wong Chew Onn	Geordine Henry / Shawnekka Phillips	Vishwanauth Tolan / Shawnekka Phillips
2006	Gareth Henry	Shenelle Peart	Willroy Myles / Dayvon Reid	Shenelle Peart / Alyssa Woon	Gareth Henry / Geordine Henry
2007	Gareth Henry	Mikaylia Haldane	Gareth Henry / Chadwick Parsons	Crystal Blake / Alicia Lewis	Shawn Forrester / Crystal Blake
2008	Gareth Henry	Mikaylia Haldane	Tossainte Taylor / Shawn Forrester	Mikaylia Haldane / Alicia Lewis	Gareth Henry / Mikaylia Haldane
2009	Dennis Coke	Shana-Kay Bailey	Dennis Coke / Anthony McNee	Mikaylia Haldane / Micole Simpson	Anthony McNee / Shana-Kay Bailey
2010					
