= Jamaica at the 2014 Commonwealth Games =

- CGF code: JAM
- CGA: Jamaica Olympic Association
- Website: www.joa.org.jm

in Glasgow, Scotland
- Flag bearer: Warren Weir
- Medals Ranked 10th: Gold 10 Silver 4 Bronze 8 Total 22

Commonwealth Games appearances (overview)
- 1934; 1938–1950; 1954; 1958; 1962; 1966; 1970; 1974; 1978; 1982; 1986; 1990; 1994; 1998; 2002; 2006; 2010; 2014; 2018; 2022; 2026; 2030

Jamaica competed in the 2014 Commonwealth Games in Glasgow, Scotland from 23 July – 3 August 2014.

== Medalists ==
Medal	Name	Sport	Event	Date
Gold	Kemar Bailey-Cole	Athletics	Men's 100 metres	July 28
Gold	O'Dayne Richards	Athletics	Men's shot put	July 28
Gold	Andrew Riley	Athletics	Men's 110 metres hurdles	July 29
Gold	Kimberly Williams	Athletics	Women's triple jump	July 29
Gold	Stephanie McPherson	Athletics	Women's 400 metres	July 29
Gold	Kaliese Spencer	Athletics	Women's 400 metres hurdles	July 31
Gold	Rasheed Dwyer	Athletics	Men's 200 metres	July 31
Gold	Jason Livermore; Kemar Bailey-Cole; Nickel Ashmeade; Usain Bolt	Athletics	Men's 4 × 100 metres relay	August 2
Gold	Kerron Stewart; Veronica Campbell-Brown; Schillonie Calvert; Shelly-Ann Fraser-Pryce	Athletics	Women's 4 × 100 metres relay	August 2
Gold	Christine Day; Novlene Williams-Mills; Anastasia le-Roy; Stephanie McPherson	Athletics	Women's 4 × 400 metres relay	August 2
Silver	Alia Atkinson	Swimming	Women's 50 metre breaststroke	July 25
Silver	Veronica Campbell-Brown	Athletics	Women's 100 metres	July 28
Silver	Novlene Williams-Mills	Athletics	Women's 400 metres	July 29
Silver	Warren Weir	Athletics	Men's 200 metres	July 31
Bronze	Alia Atkinson	Swimming	Women's 100 metre breaststroke	July 28
Bronze	Nickel Ashmeade	Athletics	Men's 100 metres	July 28
Bronze	Kerron Stewart	Athletics	Women's 100 metres	July 28
Bronze	Christine Day	Athletics	Women's 400 metres	July 29
Bronze	Jason Livermore	Athletics	Men's 200 metres	July 31
Bronze	Jason Morgan	Athletics	Men's discus throw	July 31
Bronze	Janieve Russell	Athletics	Women's 400 metres hurdles	July 31
Bronze	Jamaica national netball team: Romelda Aiken; Shanice Beckford; Kasey Evering; Stacian Facey; Thristina Harwood; Sasher-Gaye Henry; Malysha Kelly; Nicole Pinnock; Jhaniele Reid; Paula Thompson; Khadijah Williams; Vangelee Williams	Netball	Women's tournament	August 3

== Athletics ==
Men

Athlete	Event	Round 1		Semifinal		Final	
Athlete	Event	Result	Rank	Result	Rank	Result	Rank
Nickel Ashmeade	100 m	10.40	1 Q	10.21	2 Q	10.12	3rd place, bronze medalist(s)
Kemar Bailey-Cole	100 m	10.16	1 Q	10.00 SB	1 Q	10.00 =SB	1st place, gold medalist(s)
Jason Livermore	100 m	10.26	1 Q	10.11	2 Q	10.18	6
Rasheed Dwyer	200 m	20.59	1 Q	20.42	1 Q	20.14	1st place, gold medalist(s)
Jason Livermore	200 m	20.71	1 Q	20.47	1 Q	20.32	3rd place, bronze medalist(s)
Warren Weir	200 m	20.71	1 Q	20.48	1 Q	20.26	2nd place, silver medalist(s)
Akheem Gauntlett	400 m	46.31	3 Q	46.16	5	did not advance	
Hugh Graham Jr.	400 m	Disqualified					
Rusheen McDonald	400 m	46.14	3 Q	45.95	4	did not advance	
Ricardo Cunningham	800 m	1:47.71 SB	3 Q	1:47.80	4	did not advance	
Andrew Riley	110 metres hurdles	13.47	1 Q	—		13.32	1st place, gold medalist(s)
Hansle Parchment	110 metres hurdles	did not start		—		did not advance	
Richard Phillips	110 metres hurdles	13.94	4	—		did not advance	
Roxroy Cato	400 metres hurdles	Disqualified		—		did not advance	
Leford Green	400 metres hurdles	Disqualified		—		did not advance	
Annsert Whyte	400 metres hurdles	49.58	2 Q	—		did not finish	
Kimmari Roach (Heat Only); Julian Forte (Heat Only); Nickel Ashmeade; Usain Bolt; Jason Livermore (Final Only); Kemar Bailey-Cole (Final Only)	4 x 100 metres relay	38.99	1 Q	—		37.58 GR	1st place, gold medalist(s)
Chumaine Fitten (Heat Only); Edino Steele; Hugh Graham Jr (Heat Only); Omar Johnson (Heat Only); Akheem Gauntlett (Final Only); Chumaine Fitten (Final Only); Rusheen McDonald (Final Only)	4 x 400 metres relay	3:03.47	2 Q	—		3:02.17	4

Athlete	Event	Qualification		Final	
Athlete	Event	Distance	Rank	Distance	Rank
Damar Forbes	Long jump	7.90	5 Q	7.71	9
Nicholas Gordon	Long jump	7.37	18	did not advance	
Daniel Lewis	Triple jump	16.17	7 q	16.09	7
Damon McLean	Triple jump	15.91	11 q	15.38	10
Wayne Northover	Triple jump	15.50	14	did not advance	
Darrell Garwood	High jump	2.06	=19	did not advance	
K'Don Samuels	Pole vault	—		5.00	8
Raymond Brown	Shot put	18.11	12 q	18.65	8
O'Dayne Richards	Shot put	20.24	2 Q	21.62	1st place, gold medalist(s)
Jason Morgan	Discus throw	63.82	3 Q	62.34	3rd place, bronze medalist(s)
Chad Wright	Discus throw	61.08	5 q	60.33	6
Orrin Powell	Javelin throw	61.09	20	did not advance	

Women

Athlete	Event	Round 1		Semifinal		Final	
Athlete	Event	Result	Rank	Result	Rank	Result	Rank
Schillonie Calvert	100 m	11.29	1 Q	11.08 =SB	1 Q	11.21	5
Veronica Campbell-Brown	100 m	11.29	1 Q	11.02	1 Q	11.03	2nd place, silver medalist(s)
Kerron Stewart	100 m	11.35	1 Q	11.20 SB	2 Q	11.07 SB	3rd place, bronze medalist(s)
Schillonie Calvert	200 m	23.14	1 Q	22.97	1 Q	22.94	6
Samantha Henry-Robinson	200 m	23.18	2 Q	23.43	2 Q	23.24	8
Anneisha McLaughlin	200 m	23.27	1 Q	22.79	3 Q	22.68 SB	5
Christine Day	400 m	52.25	1 Q	51.02	1 Q	51.09	3rd place, bronze medalist(s)
Stephenie Ann McPherson	400 m	52.25	1 Q	50.69	1 Q	50.67	1st place, gold medalist(s)
Novlene Williams-Mills	400 m	52.39	1 Q	50.73	1 Q	50.86	2nd place, silver medalist(s)
Simoya Campbell	800 m	2.15.00	7	did not advance			
Natoya Goule	800 m	2.03.62	3 Q	2:04.23	5	did not advance	
Kimara McDonald	800 m	2.08.59	7	did not advance			
Monique Morgan	100 metres hurdles	13.61	4	—		did not advance	
Indira Spence	100 metres hurdles	13.44	4	—		did not advance	
Danielle Williams	100 metres hurdles	13.15	2 Q	—		13.06	4
Janieve Russell	400 metres hurdles	56.18	1 Q	—		55.64	3rd place, bronze medalist(s)
Kaliese Spencer	400 metres hurdles	55.45	1 Q	—		54.10	1st place, gold medalist(s)
Nikita Tracey	400 metres hurdles	57.63	3	—		did not advance	
Kerron Stewart; Veronica Campbell-Brown; Elaine Thompson (Heat Only); Shelly-Ann Fraser-Pryce; Schillonie Calvert (Final Only)	4 x 100 metres relay	42.44	1 Q	—		41.83 GR	1st place, gold medalist(s)
Christine Day; Anastasia Le-Roy; Janieve Russell (Heat Only); Shericka Williams (Heat Only); Novlene Williams-Mills (Final Only); Stephanie McPherson (Final Only)	4 x 400 metres relay	3:28.29	1 Q	—		3:23.82 GR	1st place, gold medalist(s)

Combined events – Heptathlon

Athlete	Event	100H	HJ	SP	200 m	LJ	JT	800 m	Final	Rank
Salcia Slack	Result	14.34	1.63	12.82	24.67	5.87	44.48	2:20.2	5718	5
Salcia Slack	Points	931	771	715	917	810	753	821	5718	5

Athlete	Event	Qualification		Final	
Athlete	Event	Distance	Position	Distance	Position
Jovanee Jarrett	Long jump	6.24	13	did not advance	
Chanice Porter	Long jump	did not start		did not advance	
Kimberly Williams	Triple jump	13.94	1 Q	14.21	1st place, gold medalist(s)
Shanieka Thomas	Triple jump	13.27	8 q	13.85	4
Saniel Atkinson-Grier	High jump	1.85	=9 Q	1.86	7
Kimberly Williamson	High jump	1.71	=21	did not advance	
Kellion Knibb	Discus throw	56.64	6 q	57.39	6
Danniel Thomas	Discus throw	54.32	9 q	55.02	8
Natalie Grant	Hammer throw	56.10	15	did not advance	
Vanessa Levy	Hammer throw	50.29	16	did not advance	

== Badminton ==
Mixed team

Pool E

Pos	Team	Pld	W	L	GF	GA	GD	PF	PA	PD	Pts	Qualification
1	Singapore	3	3	0	30	1	+29	644	278	+366	3	Quarterfinals
2	South Africa	3	2	1	18	14	+4	551	457	+94	2	
3	Jamaica	3	1	2	15	18	−3	527	510	+17	1	
4	Norfolk Island	3	0	3	0	30	−30	153	630	−477	0	

Source: glasgow2014.com

Singapore
5
Commonwealth Arena, Glasgow
24 July

Jamaica
0

			1	2	3
1	(Singapore) (Jamaica)	Chayut Triyachart / Yao Lei; Garron Palmer / Geordine Henry	21; 8	21; 11
2	(Singapore) (Jamaica)	Derek Wong; Gareth Henry	21; 11	21; 11
3	(Singapore) (Jamaica)	Liang Xiaoyu; Ruth Williams	21; 7	21; 5
4	(Singapore) (Jamaica)	Danny Bawa Chrisnanta / Terry Hee; Gareth Henry / Garron Palmer	21; 14	14; 21	21; 14
5	(Singapore) (Jamaica)	Vanessa Neo / Fu Mingtian; Ruth Williams / Geordine Henry	21; 4	21; 8

Norfolk Island
0
Commonwealth Arena, Glasgow
25 July

Jamaica
5

			1	2	3
1	(Norfolk Island) (Jamaica)	Michael Donohoe / Joanne Snell; Garron Palmer / Geordine Henry	4; 21	6; 21
2	(Norfolk Island) (Jamaica)	Richard Cribb; Gareth Henry	7; 21	3; 21
3	(Norfolk Island) (Jamaica)	Terry Gray; Ruth Williams	7; 21	10; 21
4	(Norfolk Island) (Jamaica)	Jason Quintal / Michael Donohoe; Gareth Henry / Garron Palmer	2; 21	5; 21
5	(Norfolk Island) (Jamaica)	Terry Gray / Joanne Snell; Ruth Williams / Gareth Henry	7; 21	10; 21

South Africa
3
Commonwealth Arena, Glasgow
26 July

Jamaica
2

			1	2	3
1	(South Africa) (Jamaica)	Andries Malan / Jennifer Fry; Garron Palmer / Geordine Henry	21; 12	14; 21	15; 21
2	(South Africa) (Jamaica)	Prakash Vijayanath; Gareth Henry	16; 21	23; 21	10; 21
3	(South Africa) (Jamaica)	Elme de Villiers; Ruth Williams	21; 12	21; 18
4	(South Africa) (Jamaica)	Willem Viljoen / Andries Malan; Geordine Henry / Garron Palmer	21; 17	21; 16
5	(South Africa) (Jamaica)	Sandra le Grange / Jennifer Fry; Ruth Williams / Geordine Henry	21; 8	21; 15

== Cycling ==
=== Mountain biking ===
Athlete	Event	Time	Rank
Robert Barnes	Men's cross-country	LAP	30

=== Road ===
Women

Athlete	Event	Time	Rank
Bianca Hernould	Road race	DNF	
Bianca Hernould	Time trial	55:32.10	31

=== Track ===
Sprint

Athlete	Event	Qualification		Round 1	Repechage	Quarterfinals	Semifinals	Final	
Athlete	Event	Time Speed (km/h)	Rank	Opposition Time Speed (km/h)	Opposition Time Speed (km/h)	Opposition Time	Opposition Time	Opposition Time	Rank
Dahlia Palmer	Women's sprint	15.220; 47.306	13	did not advance					

Pursuit

Athlete	Event	Qualification		Final	
Athlete	Event	Time	Rank	Opponent Results	Rank
Bianca Hernould	Women's pursuit	4:19.202	19	did not advance	

Time trial

Athlete	Event	Time	Rank
Dahlia Palmer	Women's time trial	39.041	12

Points race

Athlete	Event	Qualification		Final	
Athlete	Event	Points	Rank	Points	Rank
Marloe Rodman	Men's point race	3	11 Q	DNF	
Oneil Samuels	Men's point race	-40	14	did not advance	

Scratch race

Athlete	Event	Qualification	Final
Athlete	Event	Rank	Rank
Marloe Rodman	Men's scratch race	7 Q	DNF
Oneil Samuels	Men's scratch race	DNF	Did not advance
Bianca Hernould	Women's scratch race	—	23

== Diving ==
Men

Athlete	Event	Preliminaries		Final	
Athlete	Event	Points	Rank	Points	Rank
Yona Knight-Wisdom	1 m springboard	333.10	8	391.20	5
Yona Knight-Wisdom	3 m springboard	393.20	7	360.90	11

== Netball ==
Pool A

Team	Pld	W	L	PF	PA	PD	Pts	Qualification
New Zealand	5	5	0	337	151	+186	10	Semi-finals
Jamaica	5	4	1	344	184	+160	8	Semi-finals
Malawi	5	3	2	299	244	+55	6	
Northern Ireland	5	2	3	211	286	−75	4	
Scotland	5	1	4	165	268	−103	2	
Saint Lucia	5	0	5	141	364	−223	0	

Source: glasgow2014.com

24 July 2014
19:00

Report
Saint Lucia
24 – 88
Jamaica

SECC Precinct
Umpires:
Yvonne Morgan (NZL)
Sharon Kelly (AUS)
Reserve umpire:
Joshua Bowring (AUS)
Hippolyte 4/4 (100%)
Laurencin 9/13 (69%)
Maxwell 11/16 (69%)

Aiken 23/28 (82%)
Beckford 16/18 (89%)
Harwood 17/18 (94%)
Reid 32/35 (91%)

25 July 2014
19:00

Report
Jamaica
65 – 34
Northern Ireland

SECC Precinct
Umpires:
Tracy Smith (ENG)
Clare McCabe (AUS)
Reserve umpire:
Yvonne Morgan (NZL)
Beckford 12/16 (75%)
Harwood 4/7 (57%)
Reid 19/55 (35%)

Lennon 13/21 (62%)
McCullough 9/16 (56%)
Somerville 12/17 (71%)

27 July 2014
09:30

Report
Jamaica
68 – 26
Scotland

SECC Precinct
Umpires:
Theresa Prince (RSA)
Joshua Bowring (AUS)
Reserve umpire:
Gary Burgess (ENG)
Aiken 42/49 (86%)
Harwood 15/21 (71%)
Reid 11/14 (79%)

Gallagher 6/10 (60%)
MacDonald 12/17 (71%)
Pettitt 5/5 (100%)
Sole 3/5 (60%)

28 July 2014
19:00

Report
Jamaica
81 – 50
Malawi

SECC Precinct
Umpires:
Michelle Phippard (AUS)
Joshua Bowring (AUS)
Reserve umpire:
Jonathan Bredin (NZL)
Aiken 24/27 (89%)
Harwood 2/4 (50%)
Reid 55/59 (93%)

Chimaliro 3/7 (43%)
Kumwenda 31/33 (94%)
Simtowe 16/25 (64%)

30 July 2014
11:30

Report
New Zealand
50 – 42
Jamaica

SECC Precinct
Umpires:
Sharon Kelly (AUS)
Michelle Phippard (AUS)
Reserve umpire:
Clare McCabe (AUS)
Brown 29/41 (71%)
Halpenny 21/28 (75%)

Beckford 7/8 (88%)
Reid 35/39 (90%)

== Swimming ==
Men

Athlete	Event	Heat		Semifinal		Final	
Athlete	Event	Time	Rank	Time	Rank	Time	Rank
Jevon Atkinson	50 m freestyle	23.55	20	did not advance			
Jevon Atkinson	100 m freestyle	52.03	24	did not advance			
Dominic Walter	400 m freestyle	4:09.53	23	—		did not advance	
Dominic Walter	1500 m freestyle	16:56.28	19	—		did not advance	
Timothy Wynter	50 m backstroke	27.47	18	did not advance			
Timothy Wynter	100 m backstroke	58.97	20	did not advance			
Timothy Wynter	200 m backstroke	2:09.23	12	—		did not advance	
Timothy Wynter	50 m butterfly	25.79	=22	did not advance			
Dominic Walter	200 m butterfly	2:11.51	14	—		did not advance	
Dominic Walter	400 m individual medley	4:43.86	13	—		did not advance	

Women

Athlete	Event	Heat		Semifinal		Final	
Athlete	Event	Time	Rank	Time	Rank	Time	Rank
Alia Atkinson	50 m breaststroke	30.49	1 Q	30.17 GR	1 Q	30.67	2nd place, silver medalist(s)
Alia Atkinson	100 m breaststroke	1:07.95	2 Q	1:06.87	1 Q	1:08.14	3rd place, bronze medalist(s)
Zara Bailey	100 m breaststroke	1:14.49	22	did not advance			
Alia Atkinson	200 m breaststroke	2:28.33	8 Q	—		2:25.48	7
Zara Bailey	200 m breaststroke	2:37.51	16	—		did not advance	
Trudiann Patrick	50 m butterfly	28.78	23	did not advance			
Zara Bailey	100 m butterfly	1:04.25	20	did not advance			
Trudiann Patrick	100 m butterfly	1:02.82	17	did not advance			
Trudiann Patrick	200 m butterfly	2:21.28	18	—		did not advance	
Zara Bailey	200 m individual medley	2:19.83	15	—		did not advance	
Zara Bailey	400 m individual medley	4:59.78	11	—		did not advance	

== Triathlon ==
Athlete	Event	Swim (1.5 km)	Bike (40 km)	Run (10 km)	Total Time	Rank
Elisabeth Mondon	Women's	Lapped				
