= Badminton at the 2011 Pan American Games – Mixed doubles =

Badminton – Mixed doubles at the 2011 Pan American Games
- Venue: Multipurpose Gymnasium
- Dates: October 15 - October 20
- Competitors: 54 from 17 nations

Medalists
Gold medal	Toby Ng; Grace Gao	Canada
Silver medal	Halim Haryanto Ho; Eva Lee	United States
Bronze medal	Rodrigo Pacheco; Claudia Rivero	Peru
Bronze medal	Howard Bach; Paula Lynn Obañana	United States

The mixed doubles badminton event at the 2011 Pan American Games was held from October 15–20 at the Multipurpose Gymnasium in Guadalajara. The defending Pan American Games champions were Eva Lee and Howard Bach of the United States, while the defending Pan American Championship champions were Toby Ng and Grace Gao of Canada. The mixed doubles was the final badminton event of the Games.

The athletes were drawn into an elimination stage draw. Once a team lost a match it was no longer able to compete. The draw for the competition was done on October 7, 2011.

== Seeds ==
1. Toby Ng / (Canada) Grace Gao (CAN) (champions)
2. Halim Haryanto Ho / (United States) Eva Lee (USA) (final)
3. Rodrigo Pacheco / (Peru) Claudia Rivero (PER) (semifinals)
4. Lino Muñoz / (Mexico) Cynthia González (MEX) (second round)

== Results ==
=== Finals ===
Semifinals
1	Toby Ng (Canada) Grace Gao (CAN)	21	19	21
Howard Bach (United States) Paula Lynn Obañana (USA)	11	21	14
3	Rodrigo Pacheco (Peru) Claudia Rivero (PER)	13	19
2	Halim Haryanto Ho (United States) Eva Lee (USA)	21	21

Final
1	Toby Ng (Canada) Grace Gao (CAN)	21	9	21
2	Halim Haryanto Ho (United States) Eva Lee (USA)	13	21	17

=== Top half ===
First Round
D Paiola (Brazil) F Silva (BRA)	14	19
M Cuba (Peru) L Duany (PER)	21	21
M Wongsodikromo (Suriname) C Leefmans (SUR)	23	21
R Toledo (Cuba) C Mislenis (CUB)	21	11
C Araya (Chile) C Macaya (CHI)	15	15
G Henry (Jamaica) M Haldane (JAM)	21	21
N Javier (Dominican Republic) B Vibieca (DOM)	21	21
L Camacho (Venezuela) L Tovar (VEN)	14	14
H Bach (United States) P Obañana (USA)	21	21
S Teran (Ecuador) E Capote (ECU)	10	5

Second Round
1	T Ng (Canada) G Gao (CAN)	22	21
M Cuba (Peru) L Duany (PER)	20	12
A Padmore (Barbados) S Watson (BAR)	23	14	20
M Wongsodikromo (Suriname) C Leefmans (SUR)	21	21	22
4	L Muñoz (Mexico) C González (MEX)	14	19
G Henry (Jamaica) M Haldane (JAM)	21	21
N Javier (Dominican Republic) B Vibieca (DOM)	10	7
H Bach (United States) P Obañana (USA)	21	21

Quarterfinals
1	T Ng (Canada) G Gao (CAN)	21	21
M Wongsodikromo (Suriname) C Leefmans (SUR)	9	11
G Henry (Jamaica) M Haldane (JAM)	9	11
H Bach (United States) P Obañana (USA)	21	21

Semifinals
1	T Ng (Canada) G Gao (CAN)	21	19	21
H Bach (United States) P Obañana (USA)	11	21	14

=== Bottom half ===
First Round
E Mujica (Chile) N Norambuena (CHI)	19	17
C Pyne (Jamaica) K Wynter (JAM)	21	21
H Humblers (Guatemala) N Sotomayor (GUA)	22	21
D Darmohoetomo (Suriname) R Ishaak (SUR)	20	12
A López (Mexico) V Montero (MEX)	21	22
H Arthuso (Brazil) M Eliezer (BRA)	12	20
O Guerrero (Cuba) M Hernandez (CUB)	21	21
F Diaz (Argentina) V Valdesolo (ARG)	12	9
B Valentín (Puerto Rico) D Santana (PUR)	22	21	21
A Raposo (Dominican Republic) O Cabrera (DOM)	24	19	12
U Uzcategui (Venezuela) G Araujo (VEN)	6	11
D Ng (Canada) A Bruce (CAN)	21	21

Second Round
C Pyne (Jamaica) K Wynter (JAM)	19	11
H Humblers (Guatemala) N Sotomayor (GUA)	21	21
A López (Mexico) V Montero (MEX)	17	11
3	R Pacheco (Peru) C Rivero (PER)	21	21
O Guerrero (Cuba) M Hernandez (CUB)	21	21
B Valentin (Puerto Rico) D Santana (PUR)	19	9
D Ng (Canada) A Bruce (CAN)	17	9
2	H Haryanto Ho (United States) E Lee (USA)	21	21

Quarterfinals
H Humblers (Guatemala) N Sotomayor (GUA)	10	13
3	R Pacheco (Peru) C Rivero (PER)	21	21
O Guerrero (Cuba) M Hernandez (CUB)	15	13
2	H Haryanto Ho (United States) E Lee (USA)	21	21

Semifinals
3	R Pacheco (Peru) C Rivero (PER)	13	19
2	H Haryanto Ho (United States) E Lee (USA)	21	21
