= 2018 Badminton Asia Championships =

Tournament details
- Dates: 24–29 April
- Total prize money: US$350,000
- Venue: Wuhan Sports Center Gymnasium
- Location: Wuhan, China

The 2018 Badminton Asia Championships, was a badminton tournament which took place at Wuhan Sports Center Gymnasium in China from 24 to 29 April 2018 and has a total purse of $350,000.

== Tournament ==
The 2018 Badminton Asia Championships is the 37th edition of the Badminton Asia Championships. This tournament was hosted by the Chinese Badminton Association, with the sanctioned from the Badminton Asia.

=== Venue ===
This international tournament was hold at Wuhan Sports Center Gymnasium in Wuhan, China.

=== Point distribution ===
This tournament is graded based on the BWF points system for the BWF World Tour Super 500 event. Below is the table with the point distribution for each phase of the tournament.

| Winner | Runner-up | 3/4 | 5/8 | 9/16 | 17/32 | 33/64 | 65/128 | 129/256 | 257/512 | 513/1024 |
|---|---|---|---|---|---|---|---|---|---|---|
| 9,200 | 7,800 | 6,420 | 5,040 | 3,600 | 2,220 | 880 | 430 | 170 | 80 | 40 |

=== Prize money ===
The total prize money for this year tournament is US$350,000. Distribution of prize money is in accordance with BWF regulations.

| Event | Winner | Finals | Semifinals | Quarterfinals | Last 16 |
| Singles | $26,250 | $13,300 | $5,075 | $2,100 | $1,225 |
| Doubles | $27,650 | $13,300 | $4,900 | $2,537.50 | $1,312.50 |

== Medal summary ==
=== Medalists ===
| Event | Gold | Silver | Bronze |
|---|---|---|---|
| Men's singles | (Japan) Kento Momota | (China) Chen Long | (Malaysia) Lee Chong Wei |
| Men's singles | (Japan) Kento Momota | (China) Chen Long | (India) H. S. Prannoy |
| Women's singles | (Chinese Taipei) Tai Tzu-ying | (China) Chen Yufei | (India) Saina Nehwal |
| Women's singles | (Chinese Taipei) Tai Tzu-ying | (China) Chen Yufei | (South Korea) Sung Ji-hyun |
| Men's doubles | (China) Li Junhui (China) Liu Yuchen | (Japan) Takeshi Kamura (Japan) Keigo Sonoda | (China) Huang Kaixiang (China) Wang Yilü |
| Men's doubles | (China) Li Junhui (China) Liu Yuchen | (Japan) Takeshi Kamura (Japan) Keigo Sonoda | (China) Liu Cheng (China) Zhang Nan |
| Women's doubles | (Japan) Yuki Fukushima (Japan) Sayaka Hirota | (Japan) Misaki Matsutomo (Japan) Ayaka Takahashi | (Indonesia) Della Destiara Haris (Indonesia) Rizki Amelia Pradipta |
| Women's doubles | (Japan) Yuki Fukushima (Japan) Sayaka Hirota | (Japan) Misaki Matsutomo (Japan) Ayaka Takahashi | (South Korea) Kim So-yeong (South Korea) Kong Hee-yong |
| Mixed doubles | (China) Wang Yilü (China) Huang Dongping | (Indonesia) Tontowi Ahmad (Indonesia) Liliyana Natsir | (China) Zheng Siwei (China) Huang Yaqiong |
| Mixed doubles | (China) Wang Yilü (China) Huang Dongping | (Indonesia) Tontowi Ahmad (Indonesia) Liliyana Natsir | (China) Zhang Nan (China) Li Yinhui |

=== Medal table ===
| Rank | Nation | Gold | Silver | Bronze | Total |
|---|---|---|---|---|---|
| 1 | China | 2 | 2 | 4 | 8 |
| 2 | Japan | 2 | 2 | 0 | 4 |
| 3 | Chinese Taipei | 1 | 0 | 0 | 1 |
| 4 | Indonesia | 0 | 1 | 1 | 2 |
| 5 | India | 0 | 0 | 2 | 2 |
| 5 | South Korea | 0 | 0 | 2 | 2 |
| 7 | Malaysia | 0 | 0 | 1 | 1 |
| Totals (7 entries) | | 5 | 5 | 10 | 20 |

== Group stage ==
=== Men's singles ===
==== Group A ====
| Athlete | Pts | Pld | W | L | SF | SA | PF | PA |
|---|---|---|---|---|---|---|---|---|
| (Hong Kong) Hu Yun | 2 | 1 | 2 | 0 | 4 | 0 | 84 | 55 |
| (Bahrain) Adrian Ebrahim | 1 | 2 | 1 | 1 | 2 | 3 | 94 | 100 |
| (Iran) Mehran Shahbazi | 0 | 2 | 0 | 2 | 1 | 4 | 83 | 106 |

| Date | | Score | | Set 1 | Set 2 | Set 3 |
|---|---|---|---|---|---|---|
| 24 April 10:00 | (Hong Kong) Hu Yun | 2–0 | (Bahrain) Adnan Ebrahim | 21–16 | 21–14 | |
| 24 April 12:00 | (Iran) Mehran Shahbazi | 1–2 | (Bahrain) Adnan Ebrahim | 23–21 | 20–22 | 15–21 |
| 24 April 13:20 | (Hong Kong) Hu Yun | 2–0 | (Iran) Mehran Shahbazi | 21–15 | 21–10 | |

==== Group B ====
| Athlete | Pts | Pld | W | L | SF | SA | PF | PA |
|---|---|---|---|---|---|---|---|---|
| (Jordan) Bahaedeen Ahmad Alshannik | 2 | 1 | 2 | 0 | 4 | 0 | 84 | 50 |
| (Brunei) Jaspar Yu Woon Chai | 1 | 2 | 1 | 1 | 2 | 2 | 75 | 70 |
| (Mongolia) Batdavaa Munkhbat | 0 | 2 | 0 | 2 | 0 | 4 | 55 | 84 |

| Date | | Score | | Set 1 | Set 2 | Set 3 |
|---|---|---|---|---|---|---|
| 24 April 10:00 | (Jordan) Bahaedeen Ahmad Alshannik | 2–0 | (Brunei) Jaspar Yu Woon Chai | 21–18 | 21–15 | |
| 24 April 12:00 | (Mongolia) Batdavaa Munkhbat | 0–2 | (Brunei) Jaspar Yu Woon Chai | 15–21 | 13–21 | |
| 24 April 13:20 | (Jordan) Bahaedeen Ahmad Alshannik | 2–0 | (Mongolia) Batdavaa Munkhbat | 21–17 | 21–10 | |

==== Group C ====
| Athlete | Pts | Pld | W | L | SF | SA | PF | PA |
|---|---|---|---|---|---|---|---|---|
| (Thailand) Kantaphon Wangcharoen | 2 | 2 | 2 | 0 | 4 | 0 | 84 | 39 |
| (Kazakhstan) Dmitriy Panarin | 1 | 2 | 1 | 1 | 2 | 2 | 65 | 63 |
| (Maldives) Hussein Zayan Shaheed | 0 | 2 | 0 | 2 | 0 | 4 | 37 | 84 |

| Date | | Score | | Set 1 | Set 2 | Set 3 |
|---|---|---|---|---|---|---|
| 24 April 10:00 | (Thailand) Kantaphon Wangcharoen | 2–0 | (Kazakhstan) Dmitriy Panarin | 21–14 | 21–9 | |
| 24 April 12:00 | (Maldives) Hussein Zayan Shaheed | 0–2 | (Kazakhstan) Dmitriy Panarin | 16–21 | 5–21 | |
| 24 April 13:20 | (Thailand) Kantaphon Wangcharoen | 2–0 | (Maldives) Hussein Zayan Shaheed | 21–5 | 21–11 | |

==== Group D ====
| Athlete | Pts | Pld | W | L | SF | SA | PF | PA |
|---|---|---|---|---|---|---|---|---|
| (Nepal) Ratnajit Tamang | 2 | 2 | 2 | 0 | 4 | 2 | 111 | 107 |
| (Macau) Pui Pang Fong | 1 | 2 | 1 | 1 | 3 | 2 | 95 | 84 |
| (Uzbekistan) Artyom Savatyugin | 0 | 2 | 0 | 2 | 1 | 4 | 79 | 94 |

| Date | | Score | | Set 1 | Set 2 | Set 3 |
|---|---|---|---|---|---|---|
| 24 April 10:00 | (Nepal) Ratnajit Tamang | 2–1 | (Macau) Pui Pang Fong | 17–21 | 21–16 | 21–16 |
| 24 April 11:20 | (Nepal) Ratnajit Tamang | 2–1 | (Uzbekistan) Artyom Savatyugin | 21–18 | 10–21 | 21–15 |
| 24 April 12:40 | (Uzbekistan) Artyom Savatyugin | 0–2 | (Macau) Pui Pang Fong | 16–21 | 9–21 | |

=== Women's singles ===
==== Group A ====
| Athlete | Pts | Pld | W | L | SF | SA | PF | PA |
|---|---|---|---|---|---|---|---|---|
| (Vietnam) Vũ Thị Trang | Promoted to Main Draw | | | | | | | |
| (South Korea) Jeon Ju-i | 1 | 1 | 1 | 0 | 2 | 0 | 42 | 13 |
| (Sri Lanka) Thilini Pramodika Hendahewa | 0 | 1 | 0 | 1 | 0 | 2 | 13 | 42 |

| Date | | Score | | Set 1 | Set 2 | Set 3 |
|---|---|---|---|---|---|---|
| 24 April | (Vietnam) Vũ Thị Trang | no match | (Sri Lanka) Thilini Pramodika Hendahewa | | | |
| 24 April | (Vietnam) Vũ Thị Trang | no match | (South Korea) Jeon Ju-i | | | |
| 24 April 10:40 | (Sri Lanka) Thilini Pramodika Hendahewa | 0–2 | (South Korea) Jeon Ju-i | 6–21 | 7–21 | |

==== Group B ====
| Athlete | Pts | Pld | W | L | SF | SA | PF | PA |
|---|---|---|---|---|---|---|---|---|
| (Vietnam) Nguyễn Thùy Linh | 1 | 1 | 1 | 0 | 2 | 0 | 42 | 11 |
| (Maldives) Fathimath Nabaaha Abdul Razzaq | 0 | 1 | 0 | 1 | 0 | 2 | 11 | 42 |
| (India) Gadde Ruthvika Shivani | Withdrawn | | | | | | | |

| Date | | Score | | Set 1 | Set 2 | Set 3 |
|---|---|---|---|---|---|---|
| 24 April | (India) Gadde Ruthvika Shivani | w/o | (Maldives) Fathimath Nabaaha Abdul Razzaq | | | |
| 24 April | (India) Gadde Ruthvika Shivani | w/o | (Vietnam) Nguyễn Thùy Linh | | | |
| 24 April 11:20 | (Maldives) Fathimath Nabaaha Abdul Razzaq | 0–2 | (Vietnam) Nguyễn Thùy Linh | 7–21 | 4–21 | |

==== Group C ====
| Athlete | Pts | Pld | W | L | SF | SA | PF | PA |
|---|---|---|---|---|---|---|---|---|
| (Singapore) Yeo Jia Min | 2 | 2 | 2 | 0 | 4 | 0 | 84 | 38 |
| (India) Sri Krisha Pruya Kudaravalli | 1 | 2 | 1 | 1 | 2 | 2 | 85 | 49 |
| (Iran) Sorayya Aghaei | 0 | 2 | 0 | 2 | 0 | 4 | 53 | 85 |

| Date | | Score | | Set 1 | Set 2 | Set 3 |
|---|---|---|---|---|---|---|
| 24 April 10:40 | (India) Sri Krisha Pruya Kudaravalli | 2–0 | (Iran) Sorayya Aghaei | 21–12 | 22–20 | |
| 24 April 12:00 | (Singapore) Yeo Jia Min | 2–0 | (Iran) Sorayya Aghaei | 21–10 | 21–11 | |
| 24 April 14:00 | (India) Sri Krisha Pruya Kudaravalli | 0–2 | (Singapore) Yeo Jia Min | 6–21 | 11–21 | |

==== Group D ====
| Athlete | Pts | Pld | W | L | SF | SA | PF | PA |
|---|---|---|---|---|---|---|---|---|
| (Indonesia) Lyanny Alessandra Mainaky | Promoted to Main Draw | | | | | | | |
| (Singapore) Grace Chua Hui Zhen | 1 | 1 | 1 | 0 | 2 | 0 | 42 | 12 |
| (Macau) Ng Weng Chi | 0 | 1 | 0 | 1 | 0 | 2 | 12 | 42 |

| Date | | Score | | Set 1 | Set 2 | Set 3 |
|---|---|---|---|---|---|---|
| 24 April | (Indonesia) Lyanny Alessandra Mainaky | no match | (Malaysia) Ng Weng Chi | | | |
| 24 April | (Indonesia) Lyanny Alessandra Mainaky | no match | (Singapore) Grace Chua Hui Zhen | | | |
| 24 April 11:20 | (Macau) Ng Weng Chi | 0–2 | (Singapore) Grace Chua Hui Zhen | 3–21 | 9–21 | |

=== Men's doubles ===
==== Group A ====
| Athlete | Pts | Pld | W | L | SF | SA | PF | PA |
|---|---|---|---|---|---|---|---|---|
| (Jordan) Bahaedeen Ahmad Alshannik (Jordan) Mohd Naser Mansour Nayef | Promoted to Main Draw | | | | | | | |
| (Uzbekistan) Amrullo Bakhshullaev (Uzbekistan) Artyom Savatyugin | 0 | 0 | 0 | 0 | 0 | 0 | 0 | 0 |

| Date | | Score | | Set 1 | Set 2 | Set 3 |
|---|---|---|---|---|---|---|
| 24 April | (Jordan) Bahaedeen Ahmad Alshannik (Jordan) Mohd Naser Mansour Nayef | no match | (Uzbekistan) Amrullo Bakhshullaev (Uzbekistan) Artyom Savatyugin | | | |

==== Group B ====
| Athlete | Pts | Pld | W | L | SF | SA | PF | PA |
|---|---|---|---|---|---|---|---|---|
| (Sri Lanka) Dinuka Karunaratne (Sri Lanka) Niluka Karunaratne | 1 | 1 | 1 | 0 | 2 | 0 | 42 | 24 |
| (Macau) Leong Iok Chong (Macau) Pui Pang Fong | 0 | 1 | 0 | 1 | 0 | 2 | 24 | 42 |
| (India) Kapil Chaudhary (India) Brijesh Yadav | Withdrawn | | | | | | | |

| Date | | Score | | Set 1 | Set 2 | Set 3 |
|---|---|---|---|---|---|---|
| 24 April 11:20 | (India) Kapil Chaudhary (India) Brijesh Yadav | w/o | (Macau) Leong Iok Chong (Macau) Pui Pang Fong | | | |
| 24 April 12:40 | (India) Kapil Chaudhary (India) Brijesh Yadav | w/o | (Sri Lanka) Dinuka Karunaratne (Sri Lanka) Niluka Karunaratne | | | |
| 24 April 14:00 | (Sri Lanka) Dinuka Karunaratne (Sri Lanka) Niluka Karunaratne | 2–0 | (Macau) Leong Iok Chong (Macau) Pui Pang Fong | 21–13 | 21–11 | |

==== Group C ====
| Athlete | Pts | Pld | W | L | SF | SA | PF | PA |
|---|---|---|---|---|---|---|---|---|
| (Indonesia) Angga Pratama (Indonesia) Rian Agung Saputro | 2 | 2 | 2 | 0 | 4 | 2 | 84 | 56 |
| (Singapore) Danny Bawa Chrisnanta (Singapore) Terry Hee Yong Kai | 1 | 2 | 1 | 1 | 2 | 2 | 75 | 76 |
| (Kazakhstan) Artur Niyazov (Kazakhstan) Dmitiny Panarin | 0 | 2 | 0 | 2 | 0 | 4 | 55 | 84 |

| Date | | Score | | Set 1 | Set 2 | Set 3 |
|---|---|---|---|---|---|---|
| 24 April 10:40 | (Singapore) Danny Bawa Chrisnanta (Singapore) Terry Hee Yong Kai | 0–2 | (Indonesia) Angga Pratama (Indonesia) Rian Agung Saputro | 19–21 | 14–21 | |
| 24 April 13:20 | (Kazakhstan) Arutr Niyazov (Kazakhstan) Dmitriy Panarin | 0–2 | (Indonesia) Angga Pratama (Indonesia) Rian Agung Saputro | 6–21 | 15–21 | |
| 24 April 14:40 | (Singapore) Danny Bawa Chrisnanta (Singapore) Terry Hee Yong Kai | 2–0 | (Kazakhstan) Arutr Niyazov (Kazakhstan) Dmitriy Panarin | 21–19 | 21–15 | |

==== Group D ====
| Athlete | Pts | Pld | W | L | SF | SA | PF | PA |
|---|---|---|---|---|---|---|---|---|
| (Indonesia) Mohammad Ahsan (Indonesia) Hendra Setiawan | 2 | 2 | 2 | 0 | 4 | 0 | 84 | 36 |
| (Nepal) Dipesh Dhami (Nepal) Ratnajit Tamang | 1 | 2 | 1 | 1 | 2 | 3 | 78 | 91 |
| (Brunei) Ahmad Mahyuddin Haju Abas (Brunei) Mohamad Fairie Syah Ruslan | 0 | 2 | 0 | 2 | 1 | 4 | 72 | 104 |

| Date | | Score | | Set 1 | Set 2 | Set 3 |
|---|---|---|---|---|---|---|
| 24 April 10:00 | (Indonesia) Mohammad Ahsan (Indonesia) Hendra Setiawan | 2–0 | (Brunei) Ahmad Mahyuddin Haju Abas (Brunei) Mohamad Fairie Syah Ruslan | 21–8 | 21–15 | |
| 24 April 12:40 | (Nepal) Dipesh Dhami (Nepal) Ratnajit Tamang | 2–1 | (Brunei) Ahmad Mahyuddin Haju Abas (Brunei) Mohamad Fairie Syah Ruslan | 20–22 | 21–8 | 21–19 |
| 24 April 14:00 | (Indonesia) Mohammad Ahsan (Indonesia) Hendra Setiawan | 2–0 | (Nepal) Dipesh Dhami (Nepal) Ratnajit Tamang | 21–9 | 21–7 | |

=== Women's doubles ===
==== Group A ====
| Athlete | Pts | Pld | W | L | SF | SA | PF | PA |
|---|---|---|---|---|---|---|---|---|
| (Singapore) Ong Ren-ne (Singapore) Crystal Wong Jia Ying | Promoted to Main Draw | | | | | | | |

==== Group B ====
| Athlete | Pts | Pld | W | L | SF | SA | PF | PA |
|---|---|---|---|---|---|---|---|---|
| (India) Sanyogita Ghorpade (India) Prajakta Sawant | Withdrawn | | | | | | | |

==== Group C ====
| Athlete | Pts | Pld | W | L | SF | SA | PF | PA |
|---|---|---|---|---|---|---|---|---|
| (India) Kuhoo Garg (India) Ningshi Block Hazarika | Promoted to Main Draw | | | | | | | |
| (Sri Lanka) Thilini Pramodika Hendahewa (Sri Lanka) Kavidi Sirimannage | Promoted to Main Draw | | | | | | | |

==== Group D ====
| Athlete | Pts | Pld | W | L | SF | SA | PF | PA |
|---|---|---|---|---|---|---|---|---|
| (Maldives) Aminath Nabeeha Abdul Razzaq (Maldives) Fathimath Nabaaha Abdul Razzaq | Promoted to Main Draw | | | | | | | |
| (Macau) Gong Xue Xin (Macau) Ng Weng Chi | Promoted to Main Draw | | | | | | | |

=== Mixed doubles ===
==== Group A ====
| Athlete | Pts | Pld | W | L | SF | SA | PF | PA |
|---|---|---|---|---|---|---|---|---|
| (India) Rohan Kapoor (India) Kuhoo Garg | Promoted to Main Draw | | | | | | | |

==== Group B ====
| Athlete | Pts | Pld | W | L | SF | SA | PF | PA |
|---|---|---|---|---|---|---|---|---|
| (India) Saurabh Sharma (India) Anoushka Parikh | Promoted to Main Draw | | | | | | | |

==== Group C ====
| Athlete | Pts | Pld | W | L | SF | SA | PF | PA |
|---|---|---|---|---|---|---|---|---|
| (Singapore) Terry Hee Yong Kai (Singapore) Ong Ren-ne | Promoted to Main Draw | | | | | | | |
| (Sri Lanka) Sachin Dias (Sri Lanka) Thilini Pramodika Hendahewa | Promoted to Main Draw | | | | | | | |

==== Group D ====
| Athlete | Pts | Pld | W | L | SF | SA | PF | PA |
|---|---|---|---|---|---|---|---|---|
| (Maldives) Hussein Zayan Shaheed (Maldives) Fathimath Nabaaha Abdul Razzaq | Promoted to Main Draw | | | | | | | |
| (Sri Lanka) Niluka Karunaratne (Sri Lanka) Chandrika de Silva | Withdrawn | | | | | | | |

== Men's singles ==
=== Seeds ===
1. (India) Srikanth Kidambi (quarterfinals)
2. (South Korea) Son Wan-ho (quarterfinals)
3. (China) Chen Long (final)
4. (China) Shi Yuqi (second round)
5. (Malaysia) Lee Chong Wei (semifinals)
6. (China) Lin Dan (first round)
7. (Chinese Taipei) Chou Tien-chen (quarterfinals)
8. (Hong Kong) Ng Ka Long (quarterfinals)

=== Finals ===
Semifinals
5 | (Malaysia) Lee Chong Wei | 19 | 14
(Japan) Kento Momota | 21 | 21
3 | (China) Chen Long | 21 | 21
(India) H. S. Prannoy | 16 | 18

Final
(Japan) Kento Momota | 21 | 21
3 | (China) Chen Long | 17 | 13

=== Top half ===
==== Section 1 ====
First Round
1 | (India) S Kidambi | 13 | 21 | 21
(Japan) K Nishimoto | 21 | 16 | 16
D1 | (Nepal) R Tamang | 16 | 21 | 4
(Hong Kong) Wong W K | 21 | 17 | 21
5 | (Malaysia) Lee C W | 21 | 21
(China) Qiao B | 17 | 16
(Sri Lanka) N Karunaratne | 20 | 12
(Indonesia) A S Ginting | 22 | 21

Second Round
1 | (India) S Kidambi | 7
(Hong Kong) Wong W K | 2^{r}
5 | (Malaysia) Lee C W | 16 | 21 | 21
(Indonesia) A S Ginting | 21 | 9 | 11

Quarterfinals
1 | (India) S Kidambi | 12 | 15
5 | (Malaysia) Lee C W | 21 | 21

==== Section 2 ====
First Round
4 | (China) Shi YQ | 21 | 6
(South Korea) Lee D-k | 3 | 2^{r}
(Vietnam) Nguyễn TM | 11 | 15
(Japan) K Momota | 21 | 21
7 | (Chinese Taipei) Chou T-c | 23 | 21
(India) S Verma | 21 | 17
A1 | (Hong Kong) Hu Y | 14 | 8
(Thailand) K Phetpradab | 21 | 21

Second Round
4 | (China) Shi YQ | 15 | 21 | 12
(Japan) K Momota | 21 | 12 | 21
7 | (Chinese Taipei) Chou T-c | 21 | 18 | 21
(Thailand) K Phetpradab | 18 | 21 | 13

Quarterfinals
(Japan) K Momota | 21 | 21
7 | (Chinese Taipei) Chou T-c | 5 | 13

=== Bottom half ===
==== Section 3 ====
First Round
(Japan) K Sakai | 13 | 11
(Indonesia) J Christie | 21 | 21
(Chinese Taipei) Hsu J-h | 18 | 21 | 14
8 | (Hong Kong) Ng K L | 21 | 14 | 21
(Thailand) S Avihingsanon | 13 | 21 | 19
(India) B. S Praneeth | 21 | 11 | 21
B1 | (Jordan) B A Alshannik | 8 | 8
3 | (China) Chen L | 21 | 21

Second Round
(Indonesia) J Christie | 19 | 21 | 15
8 | (Hong Kong) Ng K L | 21 | 12 | 21
(India) B. S Praneeth | 12 | 12
3 | (China) Chen L | 21 | 21

Quarterfinals
8 | (Hong Kong) Ng K L | 24 | 15 | 17
3 | (China) Chen L | 22 | 21 | 21

==== Section 4 ====
First Round
(India) H. S. Prannoy | 21 | 19 | 21
C1 | (Thailand) K Wangcharoen | 15 | 21 | 19
(Chinese Taipei) Wang T-w | 15 | 21 | 21
6 | (China) Lin D | 21 | 9 | 16
(Japan) K Tsuneyama | 21 | 21
PFQ | (Singapore) R Ng Z R | 5 | 17
(Indonesia) I M Mustofa | 17 | 10
2 | (South Korea) Son W-h | 21 | 21

Second Round
(India) H. S. Prannoy | 16 | 21 | 21
(Chinese Taipei) Wang T-w | 21 | 14 | 12
(Japan) K Tsuneyama | 12 | 18
2 | (South Korea) Son W-h | 21 | 21

Quarterfinals
(India) H. S. Prannoy | 18 | 23 | 21
2 | (South Korea) Son W-h | 21 | 21 | 12

== Women's singles ==
=== Seeds ===
1. (Chinese Taipei) Tai Tzu-ying (champion)
2. (Japan) Akane Yamaguchi (withdrew)
3. (India) P. V. Sindhu (quarterfinals)
4. (Thailand) Ratchanok Intanon (second round)
5. (Japan) Nozomi Okuhara (first round)
6. (China) Chen Yufei (final)
7. (South Korea) Sung Ji-hyun (semifinals)
8. (China) He Bingjiao (quarterfinals)

=== Finals ===
Semifinals
1 | (Chinese Taipei) Tai Tzu-ying | 27 | 21
(India) Saina Nehwal | 25 | 19
7 | (South Korea) Sung Ji-hyun | 12 | 13
6 | (China) Chen Yufei | 21 | 21

Final
1 | (Chinese Taipei) Tai Tzu-ying | 21 | 22
6 | (China) Chen Yufei | 19 | 20

=== Top half ===
==== Section 1 ====
First Round
1 | (Chinese Taipei) Tai T-y | 21 | 21
A1 | (South Korea) Jeon J-i | 13 | 9
(South Korea) Kim H-m | 21 | 21
PFQ | (Indonesia) L A Mainaky | 10 | 10
8 | (China) He BJ | 21 | 21
(Hong Kong) Yip P Y | 19 | 14
(Japan) A Ohori | 7 | 21 | 18
(Thailand) P Chochuwong | 21 | 16 | 21

Second Round
1 | (Chinese Taipei) Tai T-y | 21 | 21
(South Korea) Kim H-m | 16 | 12
8 | (China) He BJ | 21 | 21
(Thailand) P Chochuwong | 10 | 12

Quarterfinals
1 | (Chinese Taipei) Tai T-y | 21 | 21
8 | (China) He BJ | 14 | 9

==== Section 2 ====
First Round
4 | (Thailand) R Intanon | 21 | 21
(Chinese Taipei) Lee C-h | 7 | 13
(Indonesia) H Ramadini | 17 | 21 | 23
(South Korea) Lee J-m | 21 | 17 | 25
5 | (Japan) N Okuhara | 15 | 21
(China) Gao FJ | 21 | 23
C1 | (Singapore) Yeo J M | 12 | 9
(India) S Nehwal | 21 | 21

Second Round
4 | (Thailand) R Intanon | 21 | 17 | 15
(South Korea) Lee J-m | 19 | 21 | 21
(China) Gao FJ | 18 | 8
(India) S Nehwal | 21 | 21

Quarterfinals
(South Korea) Lee J-m | 15 | 13
(India) S Nehwal | 21 | 21

=== Bottom half ===
==== Section 3 ====
First Round
(Malaysia) Goh J W | 21 | 15 | 10
(Thailand) B Ongbumrungpan | 18 | 21 | 21
(Japan) S Sato | 13 | 19
7 | (South Korea) Sung J-h | 21 | 21
(China) Chen XX | 21 | 21
B1 | (Vietnam) Nguyễn T L | 13 | 9
(Chinese Taipei) Pai Y-p | 14 | 19
3 | (India) P. V. Sindhu | 21 | 21

Second Round
(Thailand) B Ongbumrungpan | 14 | 12
7 | (South Korea) Sung J-h | 21 | 21
(China) Chen XX | 12 | 15
3 | (India) P. V. Sindhu | 21 | 21

Quarterfinals
7 | (South Korea) Sung J-h | 21 | 21
3 | (India) P. V. Sindhu | 19 | 10

==== Section 4 ====
First Round
(Malaysia) Lee Y Y | 21 | 17 | 17
(Thailand) N Jindapol | 12 | 21 | 21
(Chinese Taipei) Chiang M-h | 10 | 15
6 | (China) Chen YF | 21 | 21
(Hong Kong) Cheung N Y | 21 | 21
(Indonesia) D D Ayustine | 17 | 18
D1 | (Singapore) G Chua H Z | 10 | 17
PFQ | (Vietnam) Vũ T T | 21 | 21

Second Round
(Thailand) N Jindapol | 19 | 14
6 | (China) Chen YF | 21 | 21
(Hong Kong) Cheung N Y | 21 | 21
PFQ | (Vietnam) Vũ T T | 18 | 12

Quarterfinals
6 | (China) Chen YF | 21 | 21
(Hong Kong) Cheung N Y | 9 | 18

== Men's doubles ==
=== Seeds ===
1. (China) Li Junhui / Liu Yuchen (champions)
2. (China) Liu Cheng / Zhang Nan (semifinals)
3. (Japan) Takeshi Kamura / Keigo Sonoda (final)
4. (Chinese Taipei) Chen Hung-ling / Wang Chi-lin (first round)
5. (Chinese Taipei) Lee Jhe-huei / Lee Yang (quarterfinals)
6. (Japan) Takuto Inoue / Yuki Kaneko (quarterfinals)
7. (Indonesia) Fajar Alfian / Muhammad Rian Ardianto (second round)
8. (Malaysia) Goh V Shem / Tan Wee Kiong (quarterfinals)

=== Finals ===
Semifinals
1 | (China) Li Junhui (China) Liu Yuchen | 21 | 14 | 21
(China) Huang Kaixiang (China) Wang Yilü | 17 | 21 | 10
3 | (Japan) Takeshi Kamura (Japan) Keigo Sonoda | 14 | 21 | 25
2 | (China) Liu Cheng (China) Zhang Nan | 21 | 12 | 23

Final
1 | (China) Li Junhui (China) Liu Yuchen | 11 | 21 | 21
3 | (Japan) Takeshi Kamura (Japan) Keigo Sonoda | 21 | 10 | 13

=== Top half ===
==== Section 1 ====
First Round
1 | (China) Li JH (China) Liu YC | 21 | 21
B1 | (Sri Lanka) D Karunaratne (Sri Lanka) N Karunaratne | 12 | 10
(South Korea) Chung E-s (South Korea) Kim D-y | 23 | 21
(India) Arjun M.R. (India) R Shlok | 25 | 23
6 | (Japan) T Inoue (Japan) Y Kaneko | 21 | 21
(Hong Kong) Or C C (Hong Kong) Tang C M | 13 | 10
(Chinese Taipei) Lu C-y (Chinese Taipei) Yang P-h | 20 | 21 | 21
(Malaysia) Goh S F (Malaysia) N Izzuddin | 22 | 18 | 17

Second Round
1 | (China) Li JH (China) Liu YC | 21 | 21
(India) Arjun M.R. (India) R Shlok | 11 | 19
6 | (Japan) T Inoue (Japan) Y Kaneko | 21 | 21
(Chinese Taipei) Lu C-y (Chinese Taipei) Yang P-h | 16 | 8

Quarterfinals
1 | (China) Li JH (China) Liu YC | 21 | 15 | 21
6 | (Japan) T Inoue (Japan) Y Kaneko | 17 | 21 | 17

==== Section 2 ====
First Round
4 | (Chinese Taipei) Chen H-l (Chinese Taipei) Wang C-l | 11 | 19
(China) Huang KX (China) Wang YL | 21 | 21
(Malaysia) Ong Y S (Malaysia) Teo E Y | 17 | 23
C1 | (Indonesia) A Pratama (Indonesia) R A Saputro | 21 | 25
7 | (Indonesia) F Alfian (Indonesia) M R Ardianto | 21 | 21
(South Korea) Choi H-g (South Korea) Park K-h | 18 | 17
(Thailand) K Kedren (Thailand) D Puavaranukroh | 11 | 10
(Japan) H Endo (Japan) Y Watanabe | 21 | 21

Second Round
(China) Huang KX (China) Wang YL | 11
C1 | (Indonesia) A Pratama (Indonesia) R A Saputro | 4^{r}
7 | (Indonesia) F Alfian (Indonesia) M R Ardianto | 16 | 21 | 13
(Japan) H Endo (Japan) Y Watanabe | 21 | 16 | 21

Quarterfinals
(China) Huang KX (China) Wang YL | 21 | 21
(Japan) H Endo (Japan) Y Watanabe | 15 | 18

=== Bottom half ===
==== Section 3 ====
First Round
(Indonesia) B Angriawan (Indonesia) Hardianto | 15 | 22 | 21
(South Korea) Choi S-g (South Korea) Kim J-h | 21 | 20 | 15
(Chinese Taipei) Liao M-c (Chinese Taipei) Su C-h | 22 | 20
8 | (Malaysia) Goh V S (Malaysia) Tan W K | 24 | 22
(China) He JT (China) Tan Q | 21 | 21
(Thailand) T Isriyanet (Thailand) K Namdash | 14 | 18
A1 | (Uzbekistan) A Bakhshullaev (Uzbekistan) A Savatyugin | 8 | 7
3 | (Japan) T Kamura (Japan) K Sonoda | 21 | 21

Second Round
(Indonesia) B Angriawan (Indonesia) Hardianto | 16 | 18
8 | (Malaysia) Goh V S (Malaysia) Tan W K | 21 | 21
(China) He JT (China) Tan Q | 16 | 17
3 | (Japan) T Kamura (Japan) K Sonoda | 21 | 21

Quarterfinals
8 | (Malaysia) Goh V S (Malaysia) Tan W K | 18 | 17
3 | (Japan) T Kamura (Japan) K Sonoda | 21 | 21

==== Section 4 ====
First Round
(South Korea) Kim W-h (South Korea) Seo S-j | 17 | 18
D1 | (Indonesia) M Ahsan (Indonesia) H Setiawan | 21 | 21
(Malaysia) Chooi K M (Malaysia) Low J S | 16 | 21 | 16
5 | (Chinese Taipei) Lee J-h (Chinese Taipei) Lee Y | 21 | 18 | 21
(Thailand) B Issara (Thailand) N Phuangphuapet | 21 | 21
(India) M Attri (India) B. S Reddy | 14 | 16
PFQ | (Jordan) B A Alshannik (Jordan) M N M Nayef | 11 | 16
2 | (China) Liu C (China) Zhang N | 21 | 21

Second Round
D1 | (Indonesia) M Ahsan (Indonesia) H Setiawan | 18 | 21 | 16
5 | (Chinese Taipei) Lee J-h (Chinese Taipei) Lee Y | 21 | 18 | 21
(Thailand) B Issara (Thailand) N Phuangphuapet | 14 | 16
2 | (China) Liu C (China) Zhang N | 21 | 21

Quarterfinals
5 | (Chinese Taipei) Lee J-h (Chinese Taipei) Lee Y | 21 | 14 | 15
2 | (China) Liu C (China) Zhang N | 19 | 21 | 21

== Women's doubles ==
=== Seeds ===
1. (China) Chen Qingchen / Jia Yifan (second round)
2. (Japan) Misaki Matsutomo / Ayaka Takahashi (final)
3. (Japan) Yuki Fukushima / Sayaka Hirota (champions)
4. (Japan) Shiho Tanaka / Koharu Yonemoto (first round)
5. (Indonesia) Greysia Polii / Apriyani Rahayu (quarterfinals)
6. (South Korea) Lee So-hee / Shin Seung-chan (first round)
7. (Thailand) Jongkolphan Kititharakul / Rawinda Prajongjai (quarterfinals)
8. (China) Du Yue / Li Yinhui (quarterfinals)

=== Finals ===
Semifinals
(Indonesia) Della Destiara Haris (Indonesia) Rizki Amelia Pradipta | 29 | 17 | 11
3 | (Japan) Yuki Fukushima (Japan) Sayaka Hirota | 27 | 21 | 21
(South Korea) Kim So-yeong (South Korea) Kong Hee-yong | 17 | 22 | 14
2 | (Japan) Misaki Matsutomo (Japan) Ayaka Takahashi | 21 | 20 | 21

Final
3 | (Japan) Yuki Fukushima (Japan) Sayaka Hirota | 21 | 18 | 21
2 | (Japan) Misaki Matsutomo (Japan) Ayaka Takahashi | 18 | 21 | 15

=== Top half ===
==== Section 1 ====
First Round
1 | (China) Chen QC (China) Jia YF | 21 | 21
(Thailand) K Dubthuk (Thailand) N Saengchote | 10 | 18
(Indonesia) D D Haris (Indonesia) R A Pradipta | 21 | 21
(Chinese Taipei) Hsu Y-c (Chinese Taipei) Wu T-j | 17 | 16
6 | (South Korea) Lee S-h (South Korea) Shin S-c | 2^{r}
(Japan) N Fukuman (Japan) K Yonao | 5
(Hong Kong) Ng W Y (Hong Kong) Yeung N T
D1 | Bye

Second Round
1 | (China) Chen QC (China) Jia YF | 16 | 14
(Indonesia) D D Haris (Indonesia) R A Pradipta | 21 | 21
(Japan) N Fukuman (Japan) K Yonao | 21 | 21
(Hong Kong) Ng W Y (Hong Kong) Yeung N T | 8 | 12

Quarterfinals
(Indonesia) D D Haris (Indonesia) R A Pradipta | 21 | 21
(Japan) N Fukuman (Japan) K Yonao | 12 | 12

==== Section 2 ====
First Round
3 | (Japan) Y Fukushima (Japan) S Hirota | 21 | 21
(Malaysia) Chow M K (Malaysia) Lee M Y | 12 | 7
(Chinese Taipei) Cheng Y-c (Chinese Taipei) Hu L-f | 13 | 15
(China) Huang YQ (China) Tang JH | 21 | 21
7 | (Thailand) J Kititharakul (Thailand) R Prajongjai | 21 | 21
PFQ | (Macau) Gong X X (Macau) Ng W C | 11 | 9
PFQ | (Singapore) Ong R N (Singapore) C Wong J Y | 21 | 20 | 17
(India) M Jakkampudi (India) P S Ram | 14 | 22 | 21

Second Round
3 | (Japan) Y Fukushima (Japan) S Hirota | 21 | 21
(China) Huang YQ (China) Tang JH | 15 | 15
7 | (Thailand) J Kititharakul (Thailand) R Prajongjai | 21 | 21
(India) M Jakkampudi (India) P S Ram | 8 | 9

Quarterfinals
3 | (Japan) Y Fukushima (Japan) S Hirota | 21 | 21
7 | (Thailand) J Kititharakul (Thailand) R Prajongjai | 19 | 13

=== Bottom half ===
==== Section 3 ====
First Round
(Malaysia) Soong F C (Malaysia) Tee J Y | 21 | 21
PFQ | (India) K Garg (India) N B Hazarika | 10 | 12
(Thailand) C Chaladchalam (Thailand) P Muenwong | 10 | 17
8 | (China) Du Y (China) Li YH | 21 | 21
PFQ | (Maldives) A N Abdul Razzaq (Maldives) F N Abdul Razzaq | 9 | 12
(Chinese Taipei) Lin X-m (Chinese Taipei) Wu F-c | 21 | 21
(South Korea) Kim S-y (South Korea) Kong H-y | 19 | 23 | 21
4 | (Japan) S Tanaka (Japan) K Yonemoto | 21 | 21 | 19

Second Round
(Malaysia) Soong F C (Malaysia) Tee J Y | 18 | 10
8 | (China) Du Y (China) Li YH | 21 | 21
(Chinese Taipei) Lin X-m (Chinese Taipei) Wu F-c | 7 | 5
(South Korea) Kim S-y (South Korea) Kong H-y | 21 | 21

Quarterfinals
8 | (China) Du Y (China) Li YH | 17 | 22 | 11
(South Korea) Kim S-y (South Korea) Kong H-y | 21 | 20 | 21

==== Section 4 ====
First Round
(India) A Balan (India) Sruthi K.P | 10 | 10
(South Korea) Baek H-n (South Korea) Lee Y-r | 21 | 21
(China) Huang DP (China) Li WM | 21 | 11 | 19
5 | (Indonesia) G Polii (Indonesia) A Rahayu | 15 | 21 | 21
(Chinese Taipei) Chiang K-h (Chinese Taipei) Hung S-h | 18 | 13
(Thailand) S Amitrapai (Thailand) P Chochuwong | 21 | 21
PFQ | (Sri Lanka) T P Hendahewa (Sri Lanka) K Sirimannage | 6 | 7
2 | (Japan) M Matsutomo (Japan) A Takahashi | 21 | 21

Second Round
(South Korea) Baek H-n (South Korea) Lee Y-r | 12 | 21 | 13
5 | (Indonesia) G Polii (Indonesia) A Rahayu | 21 | 17 | 21
(Thailand) S Amitrapai (Thailand) P Chochuwong | 11 | 0^{r}
2 | (Japan) M Matsutomo (Japan) A Takahashi | 21 | 0

Quarterfinals
5 | (Indonesia) G Polii (Indonesia) A Rahayu | 19 | 14
2 | (Japan) M Matsutomo (Japan) A Takahashi | 21 | 21

== Mixed doubles ==
=== Seeds ===
1. (Indonesia) Tontowi Ahmad / Liliyana Natsir (final)
2. (China) Wang Yilü / Huang Dongping (champions)
3. (Hong Kong) Tang Chun Man / Tse Ying Suet (quarterfinals)
4. (South Korea) Seo Seung-jae / Kim Ha-na (first round)
5. (China) Zheng Siwei / Huang Yaqiong (semifinals)
6. (Malaysia) Goh Soon Huat / Shevon Jemie Lai (second round)
7. (Malaysia) Tan Kian Meng / Lai Pei Jing (first round)
8. (Thailand) Dechapol Puavaranukroh / Sapsiree Taerattanachai (quarterfinals)

=== Finals ===
Semifinals
1 | (Indonesia) Tontowi Ahmad (Indonesia) Liliyana Natsir | 21 | 21
5 | (China) Zheng Siwei (China) Huang Yaqiong | 11 | 13
(China) Zhang Nan (China) Li Yinhui | 21 | 18 | 17
2 | (China) Wang Yilü (China) Huang Dongping | 18 | 21 | 21

Final
1 | (Indonesia) Tontowi Ahmad (Indonesia) Liliyana Natsir | 17 | 17
2 | (China) Wang Yilü (China) Huang Dongping | 21 | 21

=== Top half ===
==== Section 1 ====
First Round
1 | (Indonesia) T Ahmad (Indonesia) L Natsir | 21 | 21
(Japan) Y Kaneko (Japan) K Yonemoto | 18 | 12
(Thailand) T Isriyanet (Thailand) P Chochuwong | 21 | 17 | 21
(Chinese Taipei) Lu C-y (Chinese Taipei) Chiang K-h | 11 | 21 | 12
7 | (Malaysia) Tan K M (Malaysia) Lai P J | 21 | 12 | 16
(China) He JT (China) Du Y | 18 | 21 | 21
(South Korea) Kim W-h (South Korea) Shin S-c | 21 | 21
PFQ | (India) S Sharma (India) A Parikh | 17 | 14

Second Round
1 | (Indonesia) T Ahmad (Indonesia) L Natsir | 21 | 21
(Thailand) T Isriyanet (Thailand) P Chochuwong | 16 | 15
(China) He JT (China) Du Y | 21 | 21
(South Korea) Kim W-h (South Korea) Shin S-c | 12 | 18

Quarterfinals
1 | (Indonesia) T Ahmad (Indonesia) L Natsir | 21 | 9 | 21
(China) He JT (China) Du Y | 11 | 21 | 10

==== Section 2 ====
First Round
3 | (Hong Kong) Tang C M (Hong Kong) Tse Y S | 21 | 21
(Indonesia) P Jordan (Indonesia) M D Oktavianti | 16 | 12
(Thailand) N Phuangphuapet (Thailand) J Kititharakul | 21 | 13 | 21
(Singapore) D B Chrisnanta (Singapore) C Wong J Y | 9 | 21 | 12
5 | (China) Zheng SW (China) Huang YQ | 21 | 21
PFQ | (Maldives) H Z Shaheed (Maldives) F N Abdul Razzaq | 2 | 9
(Chinese Taipei) Liao M-c (Chinese Taipei) Chen H-h | 17 | 22
(South Korea) Choi S-g (South Korea) Chae Y-j | 21 | 24

Second Round
3 | (Hong Kong) Tang C M (Hong Kong) Tse Y S | 22 | 21
(Thailand) N Phuangphuapet (Thailand) J Kititharakul | 20 | 12
5 | (China) Zheng SW (China) Huang YQ | 21 | 21
(South Korea) Choi S-g (South Korea) Chae Y-j | 16 | 16

Quarterfinals
3 | (Hong Kong) Tang C M (Hong Kong) Tse Y S | 8 | 7
5 | (China) Zheng SW (China) Huang YQ | 21 | 21

=== Bottom half ===
==== Section 3 ====
First Round
(Chinese Taipei) Wang C-l (Chinese Taipei) Lee C-h | 21 | 21
PFQ | (Singapore) T Hee Y K (Singapore) Ong R N | 15 | 13
(Hong Kong) Chang T C (Hong Kong) Ng W Y | 21 | 12 | 15
8 | (Thailand) D Puavaranukroh (Thailand) S Taerattanachai | 18 | 21 | 21
PFQ | (India) R Kapoor (India) K Garg | 10 | 17
(China) Zhang N (China) Li YH | 21 | 21
(Japan) Y Watanabe (Japan) A Higashino | 21 | 21
4 | (South Korea) Seo S-j (South Korea) Kim H-n | 16 | 12

Second Round
(Chinese Taipei) Wang C-l (Chinese Taipei) Lee C-h | 21 | 18 | 18
8 | (Thailand) D Puavaranukroh (Thailand) S Taerattanachai | 11 | 21 | 21
(China) Zhang N (China) Li YH | 19 | 22 | 21
(Japan) Y Watanabe (Japan) A Higashino | 21 | 20 | 8

Quarterfinals
8 | (Thailand) D Puavaranukroh (Thailand) S Taerattanachai | 16 | 16
(China) Zhang N (China) Li YH | 21 | 21

==== Section 4 ====
First Round
PFQ | (Sri Lanka) S Dias (Sri Lanka) T P Hendahewa | 14 | 21 | 10
(Indonesia) R K Suwardi (Indonesia) D Susanto | 21 | 17 | 21
(Chinese Taipei) Lee Y (Chinese Taipei) Hsu Y-c | 19 | 6
6 | (Malaysia) Goh S H (Malaysia) S J Lai | 21 | 21
(Hong Kong) Lee C H (Hong Kong) Chau H W | 21 | 21
(India) V G Prasad (India) J Dewangan | 11 | 13
(Vietnam) Đỗ Tu Đ (Vietnam) Phạm N T | 10 | 15
2 | (China) Wang YL (China) Huang DP | 21 | 21

Second Round
(Indonesia) R K Suwardi (Indonesia) D Susanto | 21 | 26
6 | (Malaysia) Goh S H (Malaysia) S J Lai | 16 | 24
(Hong Kong) Lee C H (Hong Kong) Chau H W | 16 | 17
2 | (China) Wang YL (China) Huang DP | 21 | 21

Quarterfinals
(Indonesia) R K Suwardi (Indonesia) D Susanto | 15 | 19
2 | (China) Wang YL (China) Huang DP | 21 | 21
