= Dennis Coke =

Jamaican badminton player

Personal information
- Born: 7 October 1993 (age 33) Kingston, Jamaica
- Height: 1.82 m (6 ft 0 in)
- Weight: 70 kg (154 lb)

Sport
- Country: Jamaica
- Sport: Badminton

Men's singles & doubles
- Highest ranking: 218 (MS 22 February 2018); 121 (MD 5 April 2018); 149 (XD 30 November 2017)
- BWF profile
Medal record
Men's badminton
Representing Jamaica
Pan Am Championships
Bronze medal – third place	2016 Campinas	Mixed doubles
Pan Am Men's Team Championships
Bronze medal – third place	2018 Tacarigua	Men's team

Dennis Coke (born 7 October 1993) is a Jamaican badminton player who competed at the 2010 Summer Youth Olympics in Singapore. In 2009, he won the boys' singles and doubles at the All Jamaica Junior Championships. At the BWF International tournament, he was the men's doubles runner-up at the 2015 Carebaco International and mixed doubles runner-up at the 2017 Jamaica International. He also won the bronze medal at the 2016 Pan Am Badminton Championships in the mixed doubles event partnered with Wynter. In 2017, he won the Jamaican National Badminton Championships in the men's singles and doubles event partnered with Anthony McNee. Coke was part of the national team that won the men's team bronze at the 2018 Pan Am Men's Team Championships. In 2018, he competed at the Commonwealth Games in Gold Coast.

Coke graduated from the G.C Foster College, and now works as P.E. teacher at St. Anne's Primary School.

== Achievements ==
=== Pan Am Championships ===
Mixed doubles
Year	Venue	Partner	Opponent	Score	Result
2016	Clube Fonte São Paulo; Campinas, Brazil	(Jamaica) Katherine Wynter	(Canada) Nyl Yakura (Canada) Brittney Tam	11–21, 9–21	Bronze

=== BWF International Challenge/Series (2 titles, 5 runners-up) ===
Men's doubles
Year	Tournament	Partner	Opponent	Score	Result
2018	Suriname International	(Jamaica) Anthony McNee	(Guatemala) Rodolfo Ramírez (Guatemala) Jonathan Solís	Walkover	(gold) Winner
2017	Suriname International	(Jamaica) Anthony McNee	(Jamaica) Gareth Henry (Jamaica) Samuel O'Brien Ricketts	8–21, 21–19, 21–18	(gold) Winner
2015	Carebaco International	(Jamaica) Anthony McNee	(Jamaica) Gareth Henry (Jamaica) Dayvon Reid	16–21, 22–20, 18–21	(silver) Runner-up

Mixed doubles
Year	Tournament	Partner	Opponent	Score	Result
2020	Jamaica International	(Jamaica) Tahlia Richardson	(Guatemala) Jonathan Solís (Guatemala) Diana Corleto Soto	21–23, 17–21	(silver) Runner-up
2017	Suriname International	(Jamaica) Katherine Wynter	(Cuba) Leodannis Martinez (Cuba) Tahimara Oropeza	16–21, 18–21	(silver) Runner-up
2017	Peru International	(Jamaica) Katherine Wynter	(Peru) Mario Cuba (Peru) Katherine Winder	9–21, 9–21	(silver) Runner-up
2017	Jamaica International	(Jamaica) Katherine Wynter	(Canada) Toby Ng (Canada) Rachel Honderich	9–21, 8–21	(silver) Runner-up

BWF International Challenge tournament
BWF International Series tournament
BWF Future Series tournament
