= Gareth Henry =

Jamaican badminton player (born 1991)

Personal information
- Born: Gareth Andre Theodore Henry; 10 August 1991 (age 35) Mandeville, Jamaica
- Height: 1.82 m (6 ft 0 in)
- Weight: 77 kg (170 lb)

Sport
- Country: Jamaica
- Sport: Badminton

Men's singles & doubles
- Highest ranking: 116 (MS 19 April 2012); 109 (MD 19 July 2018); 169 (XD 18 February 2015)
- BWF profile
Medal record
Men's badminton
Representing Jamaica
Pan Am Championships
Bronze medal – third place	2019 Aguascalientes	Men's doubles
Pan Am Men's Team Championships
Bronze medal – third place	2018 Tacarigua	Men's team
Central American and Caribbean Games
Gold medal – first place	2018 Barranquilla	Men's doubles
Silver medal – second place	2010 Mayagüez	Mixed doubles
Silver medal – second place	2010 Mayagüez	Men's team
Bronze medal – third place	2010 Mayagüez	Men's singles
Bronze medal – third place	2010 Mayagüez	Men's doubles

Gareth Andre Theodore Henry (born 10 August 1991) is a Jamaican badminton player. He competed at the 2014 Commonwealth Games; and 2011 and 2015 Pan American Games. Henry was part of the national team that won the men's team bronze at the 2018 Pan Am Men's Team Championships. Partnered with Samuel O'Brien Ricketts, he clinched the men's doubles gold at the 2018 Central American and Caribbean Games.

== Personal life ==
Her sister, Geordine Henry also a professional badminton player. They teamed-up and won the mixed doubles title at the Jamaican National Badminton Championships six times from 2008 to 2016.

== Achievements ==
=== Pan Am Championships ===
Men's doubles
Year	Venue	Partner	Opponent	Score	Result
2019	Gimnasio Olímpico; Aguascalientes, Mexico	(Jamaica) Samuel O'Brien Ricketts	(Canada) Jason Ho-shue (Canada) Nyl Yakura	15–21, 13–21	Bronze

=== Central American and Caribbean Games ===
Men's singles
Year	Venue	Opponent	Score	Result
2010	Raymond Dalmau Coliseum; Mayagüez, Puerto Rico	(Guatemala) Kevin Cordón	7–21, 11–21	Bronze

Men's doubles
Year	Venue	Partner	Opponent	Score	Result
2018	Coliseo Universidad del Norte; Barranquilla, Colombia	(Jamaica) Samuel O'Brien Ricketts	(Cuba) Osleni Guerrero (Cuba) Leodannis Martínez	21–12, 11–21, 21–19	Gold
2010	Raymond Dalmau Coliseum; Mayagüez, Puerto Rico	(Jamaica) Garron Palmer	(Guatemala) Kevin Cordón (Guatemala) Rodolfo Ramirez	12–21, 17–21	Bronze

Mixed doubles
Year	Venue	Partner	Opponent	Score	Result
2010	Raymond Dalmau Coliseum; Mayagüez, Puerto Rico	(Jamaica) Kristal Karjohn	(Jamaica) Garron Palmer (Jamaica) Alya Lewis	14–21, 15–21	Silver

=== BWF International Challenge/Series (8 titles, 7 runner-up) ===
Men's singles
Year	Tournament	Opponent	Score	Result
2015	Carebaco International	(Dominican Republic) William Cabrera	21–8, 21–16	(gold) Winner
2014	Carebaco International	(Jamaica) Anthony McNee	21–17, 21–15	(gold) Winner

Men's doubles
Year	Tournament	Partner	Opponent	Score	Result
2019	Carebaco International	(Jamaica) Samuel Ricketts	(United States) Timothy Lam (Canada) Antonio Li	21–9, 21–16	(gold) Winner
2019	Jamaica International	(Jamaica) Samuel Ricketts	(Guatemala) Jonathan Solís (Guatemala) Rodolfo Ramírez	8–21, 21–14, 18–21	(silver) Runner-up
2018	Jamaica International	(Jamaica) Samuel Ricketts	(India) Tarun Kona (India) Saurabh Sharma	17–21, 17–21	(silver) Runner-up
2017	Suriname International	(Jamaica) Samuel Ricketts	(Jamaica) Dennis Coke (Jamaica) Anthony McNee	21–8, 19–21, 18–21	(silver) Runner-up
2017	Carebaco International	(Jamaica) Samuel Ricketts	(United States) Phillip Chew (United States) Ryan Chew	12–21, 21–14, 21–12	(gold) Winner
2015	Carebaco International	(Jamaica) Dayvon Reid	(Jamaica) Dennis Coke (Jamaica) Anthony McNee	21–16, 20–22, 21–18	(gold) Winner
2014	Carebaco International	(Jamaica) Garron Palmer	(Jamaica) Wilroy Myles (Jamaica) Jamari Rose	21–19, 29–27	(gold) Winner
2013	Santo Domingo Open	(Jamaica) Samuel Ricketts	(Brazil) Hugo Arthuso (Brazil) Alex Yuwan Tjong	19–21, 21–16, 21–15	(gold) Winner
2013	Carebaco International	(United States) Bjorn Seguin	(Dominican Republic) Nelson Javier (Dominican Republic) Alberto Raposo	21–19, 21–17	(gold) Winner
2011	Santo Domingo Open	(Jamaica) Charles Pyne	(Canada) Francois Bourret (Canada) Kevin Li	19–21, 21–6, 21–12	(silver) Runner-up

Mixed doubles
Year	Tournament	Partner	Opponent	Score	Result
2015	Carebaco International	(Jamaica) Katherine Wynter	(Dominican Republic) Nelson Javier (Dominican Republic) Daigenis Saturria	17–21, 19–21	(silver) Runner-up
2013	Carebaco International	(Jamaica) Geordine Henry	(Guatemala) Anibal Marroquin (Guatemala) Krisley López	16–21, 19–21	(silver) Runner-up
2011	Carebaco International	(Jamaica) Geordine Henry	(Suriname) Mitchel Wongsodikromo (Suriname) Crystal Leefmans	17–21, 11–21	(silver) Runner-up

BWF International Challenge tournament
BWF International Series tournament
BWF Future Series tournament
