= Mikaylia Haldane =

Jamaican badminton player (born 1995)

Personal information
- Born: Mikaylia Roanna Haldane; 25 February 1995 (age 31)
- Height: 1.62 m (5 ft 4 in)
- Weight: 56 kg (123 lb)

Sport
- Country: Jamaica
- Sport: Badminton

Women's singles & doubles
- Highest ranking: 385 (WS 3 November 2016); 454 (WD 27 September 2012); 263 (XD 13 September 2012)
- BWF profile

Mikaylia Roanna Haldane (born 25 February 1995) is a Jamaican badminton player. Haldane was the mixed doubles champion at the 2009 National Championships with her partner Daniel Thompson. She was selected to compete at the 2011 Pan American Games in Guadalajara, Mexico. Partnered with Garron Palmer, she emerged as the mixed doubles champion at the 2014 Carebaco International tournament. Haldane also participated at the 2014 and 2018 Central American and Caribbean Games.

== Achievements ==
=== BWF International Challenge/Series ===
Women's doubles
Year	Tournament	Partner	Opponent	Score	Result
2014	Carebaco International	(Jamaica) Geordine Henry	(Barbados) Shari Watson (Barbados) Tamisha Williams	11–21, 17–21	(silver) Runner-up
2016	Jamaica International	(Jamaica) Geordine Henry	(Jamaica) Ruth Williams (Jamaica) Katherine Wynter	17–21, 21–10, 15–21	(silver) Runner-up
2016	Carebaco International	(Jamaica) Katherine Wynter	(Dominican Republic) Nairoby Jiménez (Dominican Republic) Bermary Polanco	17–21, 23–21, 15–21	(silver) Runner-up
2017	Jamaica International	(Jamaica) Katherine Wynter	(Australia) Leanne Choo (Canada) Rachel Honderich	2–21, 8–21	(silver) Runner-up

Mixed doubles
Year	Tournament	Partner	Opponent	Score	Result
2014	Carebaco International	(Jamaica) Garron Palmer	(Jamaica) Jamari Rose (Jamaica) Terry Leyow-Walker	21–19, 21–15	(gold) Winner

BWF International Challenge tournament
BWF International Series tournament
BWF Future Series tournament
