= Nepal International =

International badminton tournament

The Nepal International is an international badminton tournament held in Nepal. The tournament sanctioned by the Badminton World Federation and part of the Badminton Asia circuit.

== Past winners ==
Year	Men's singles	Women's singles	Men's doubles	Women's doubles	Mixed doubles	Ref
2005	(Pakistan) Qamar Ahsan	(Sri Lanka) Chandrika de Silva	(Pakistan) Mir Tahir Ishaq (Pakistan) Ahmed Waqas	No competition	(Sri Lanka) Thushara Edirisinghe (Sri Lanka) Chandrika de Silva	
2006– 2007	No competition					
2008	(India) Chetan Anand	(India) Bibari Basumatary	(India) Diju Valiyaveetil (India) Akshay Dewalkar	(India) Jwala Gutta (India) Shruti Kurien	(India) Diju Valiyaveetil (India) Jwala Gutta	
2009– 2015	No competition					
2016	(India) Abhishek Yeligar	(Vietnam) Nguyễn Thùy Linh	(India) Arjun M.R. (India) Ramchandran Shlok	(India) Meghana Jakkampudi (India) Poorvisha S. Ram	(India) Saurabh Sharma (India) Anoushka Parikh	
2017	(India) Shreyansh Jaiswal	(China) Deng Joy Xuan	(Singapore) Danny Bawa Chrisnanta (Singapore) Terry Hee Yong Kai	(India) Aparna Balan (India) Sruthi K.P.	(India) Vighnesh Devlekar (India) Harika Veludurthi	
2018	(Thailand) Kunlavut Vitidsarn	(Thailand) Chananchida Jucharoen	(Thailand) Supak Jomkoh (Thailand) Wachirawit Sothon	(India) Aparna Balan (India) Sruthi K.P.	(Thailand) Supak Jomkoh (Thailand) Supissara Paewsampran	
2019 IS	(Malaysia) Yeoh Seng Zoe	(India) Malvika Bansod	(India) Rohan Kapoor (India) Saurabh Sharma	(Nepal) Pooja Shrestha (Nepal) Nangsal Tamang	(India) Venkat Gaurav Prasad (India) Juhi Dewangan	
2019 IC	(Vietnam) Phạm Cao Cường	(Thailand) Porntip Buranaprasertsuk	(India) Manu Attri (India) B. Sumeeth Reddy	(Australia) Setyana Mapasa (Australia) Gronya Somerville	(Thailand) Supak Jomkoh (Thailand) Supissara Paewsampran	
2020– 2023	No competition					
2024	(India) Meiraba Maisnam	(Thailand) Lalinrat Chaiwan	(Malaysia) Lau Yi Sheng (Malaysia) Lee Yi Bo	(Malaysia) Kisona Selvaduray (Malaysia) Yap Rui Chen	(Malaysia) Lau Yi Sheng (Malaysia) Yap Rui Chen	
2025	No competition					

== Performances by nation ==
As of the 2024 edition

Pos	Nation	MS	WS	MD	WD	XD	Total
1	India	4	2	4	4	4	18
2	Thailand	1	3	1	0	2	7
3	Malaysia	1	0	1	1	1	4
4	Pakistan	1	0	1	0	0	2
4	Sri Lanka	0	1	0	0	1	2
4	Vietnam	1	1	0	0	0	2
7	Australia	0	0	0	1	0	1
7	China	0	1	0	0	0	1
7	Nepal	0	0	0	1	0	1
7	Singapore	0	0	1	0	0	1
Total		8	8	8	7	8	39
