= Tamisha Williams =

Barbadian badminton player (born 1982)

Personal information
- Born: Tamisha Janelle Williams; 29 November 1982 (age 43)

Sport
- Country: Barbados
- Sport: Badminton

Women's singles & doubles
- Highest ranking: 236 (WS 13 August 2019); 174 (WD 29 March 2018); 203 (XD 13 August 2019)
- BWF profile

Tamisha Janelle Williams (born 29 November 1982) is a Barbadian badminton player.

== Achievements ==
=== BWF International Challenge/Series ===
Women's singles
Year	Tournament	Opponent	Score	Result
2018	Carebaco International	(Guyana) Priyanna Ramdhani	21–17, 17–21, 21–18	(gold) Winner
2016	Suriname International	(Trinidad and Tobago) Solangel Guzman	26–24, 12–21, 5–21	(silver) Runner-up
2014	Carebaco International	(Trinidad and Tobago) Solangel Guzman	4–21, 11–21	(silver) Runner-up

Women's doubles
Year	Tournament	Partner	Opponent	Score	Result
2019	Carebaco International	(Barbados) Monyata Riviera	(Czech Republic) Tereza Švábíková (Czech Republic) Katerina Tomalova	Walkover	(gold) Winner
2018	Carebaco International	(Barbados) Monyata Riviera	(Trinidad and Tobago) Chequeda De Boulet (Guyana) Priyanna Ramdhani	21–15, 21–14	(gold) Winner
2017	Suriname International	(Barbados) Monyata Riviera	(Suriname) Crystal Leefmans (Suriname) Priscila Tjitrodipo	21–17, 21–17	(gold) Winner
2014	Carebaco International	(Barbados) Shari Watson	(Jamaica) Mikaylia Haldane (Jamaica) Geordine Henry	21–11, 21–17	(gold) Winner

Mixed doubles
Year	Tournament	Partner	Opponent	Score	Result
2018	Carebaco International	(Barbados) Dakeil Jonathan Thorpe	(Suriname) Dylan Darmohoetomo (Dominican Republic) Crystal Leefmans	20–22, 21–18, 19–21	(silver) Runner-up
2016	Carebaco International	(Barbados) Dakeil Jonathan Thorpe	(Dominican Republic) Nelson Javier (Dominican Republic) Noemi Almonte	21–10, 21–18	(gold) Winner

BWF International Challenge tournament
BWF International Series tournament
BWF Future Series tournament
