= Dominic Walter =

Jamaican swimmer (born 1992)

Personal information
- Nationality: Jamaica
- Born: December 17, 1992 (age 33) Kingston, Jamaica

Sport
- Sport: Swimming
- Strokes: Freestyle

Dominic Walter is a competitive swimmer from Jamaica.
