= Anoushka Parikh =

Indian badminton player (born 1997)

Personal information
- Born: Anoushka Ashit Parikh; 26 March 1997 (age 29) Ahmedabad, Gujarat, India

Sport
- Country: India
- Sport: Badminton
- Handedness: Right

Women's Doubles & Mixed Doubles
- Highest ranking: 95 (WD 10 December 2019); 44 (XD 9 July 2019)
- BWF profile
Medal record
Women's badminton
Representing India
South Asian Games
Gold medal – first place	2019 Kathmandu-Pokhara	Women's team
Bronze medal – third place	2019 Kathmandu-Pokhara	Women's doubles

Anoushka Ashit Parikh (born 26 March 1997) is an Indian badminton player.

== Achievements ==
=== South Asian Games ===
Women's doubles
Year	Venue	Partner	Opponent	Score	Result
2019	Badminton Covered Hall; Pokhara, Nepal	(India) Kuhoo Garg	(Sri Lanka) Achini Ratnasiri (Sri Lanka) Upuli Weerasinghe	10–21, 18–21	Bronze

=== BWF International Challenge/Series ===
Women's doubles
Year	Tournament	Partner	Opponent	Score	Result
2016	Nepal International	(India) Harika Veludurthi	(India) Meghana Jakkampudi (India) Poorvisha S Ram	16–21, 12–21	(silver) Runner-up

Mixed doubles
Year	Tournament	Partner	Opponent	Score	Result
2018	Kharkiv International	(India) Saurabh Sharma	(Poland) Paweł Śmiłowski (Poland) Magdalena Świerczyńska	18–21, 21–19, 22–20	(gold) Winner
2018	Brazil International	(India) Saurabh Sharma	(Russia) Evgenij Dremin (Russia) Evgenia Dimova	17–21, 14–21	(silver) Runner-up
2017	South Africa International	(India) Saurabh Sharma	(South Africa) Andries Malan (South Africa) Jennifer Fry	19–21, 19–21	(silver) Runner-up
2017	Kharkiv International	(India) Saurabh Sharma	(India) K. Nandagopal (India) Mahima Aggarwal	14–21, 15–21	(silver) Runner-up
2016	Nepal International	(India) Saurabh Sharma	(India) Venkat Gaurav Prasad (India) Juhi Dewangan	14–21, 21–19, 21–19	(gold) Winner

BWF International Challenge tournament
BWF International Series tournament
BWF Future Series tournament
