= Alya Lewis =

Jamaican badminton player

Personal information
- Full name: Alya Dawn Lewis
- Born: 29 January 1980 (age 46) Kingston, Jamaica
- Height: 1.52 m (5 ft 0 in) (2006)
- Weight: 46 kg (101 lb) (2006)

Sport
- Sport: Badminton
- BWF profile
Medal record
Women's badminton
Representing Jamaica
Central American and Caribbean Games
Gold medal – first place	2010 Mayagüez	Mixed doubles

Alya Dawn Lewis (born 29 January 1980) is a badminton player and coach from Jamaica.

== Career ==
Aged 18, Lewis took part her first international competition at the 1998 Commonwealth Games in Kuala Lumpur, on 10 September 1998.

Competing at the Jamaican senior level, Lewis paired with Nigella Saunders to win the ladies' doubles in 2005, 2006, and 2007. She won the ladies' singles in 2010. In 2011, she paired with Christine Leyow-Mayne to win the ladies' doubles and with Bradley Graham to win the mixed doubles.

Pairing with Garron Palmer, Lewis won the mixed doubles final in 2009 and 2010.

Lewis was the number one ranking women's Badminton player in Jamaica for most of 2012.

Between 1997 and 2010, she played 38 matches in her international badminton career, winning 20 of them. Her most recent international match was at the 2010 Commonwealth Games in Delhi.

She completed the Badminton World Federation Level One coaching course.in 2014, and worked as a coach and a manager for the Jamaica Badminton Association from at least 2013 to 2015.
