= Saurabh Sharma =

Indian badminton player (born 1997)

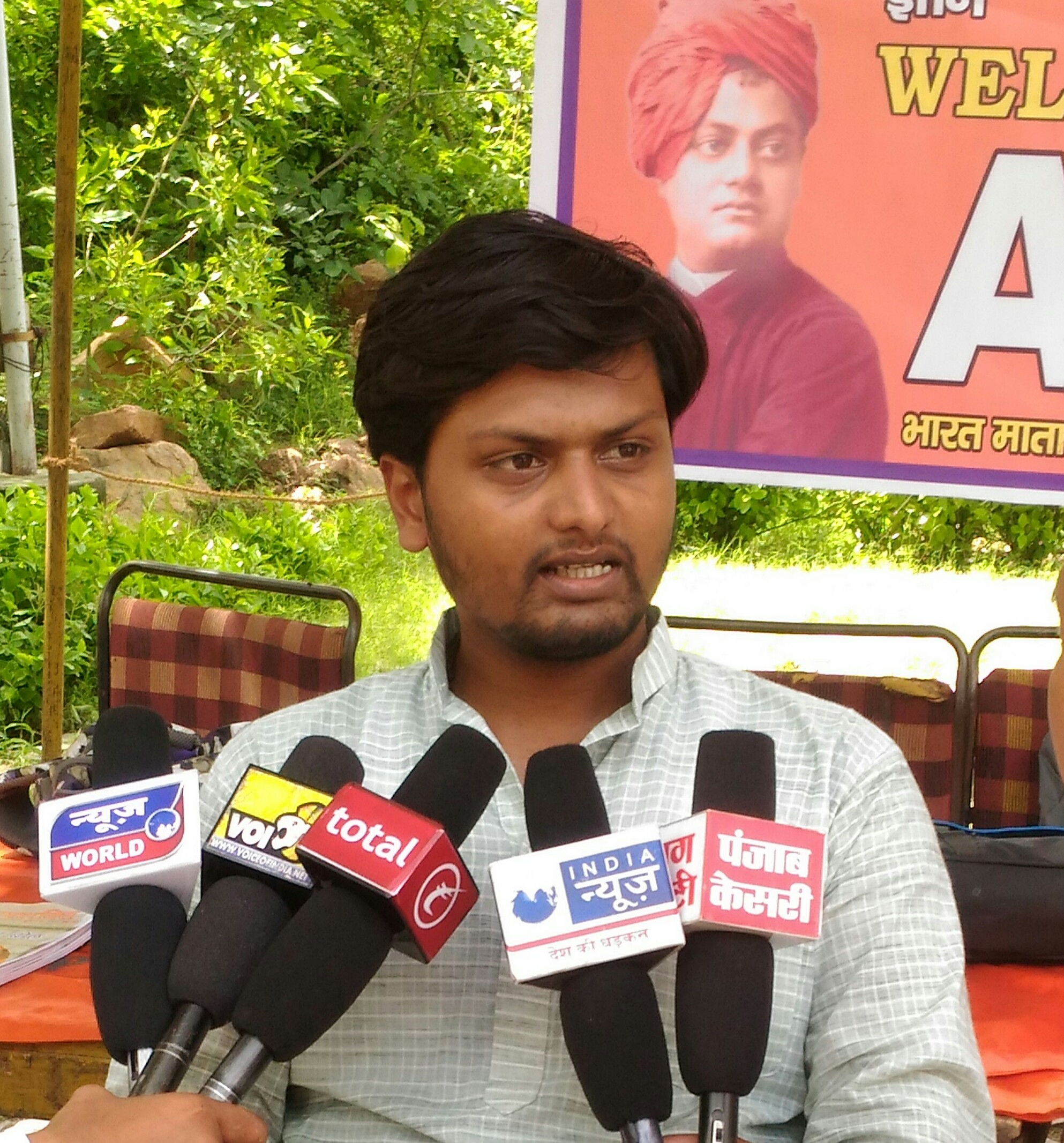

Personal information
- Born: 30 December 1997 (age 28) Sonipat, Haryana
- Years active: 2016-present

Sport
- Country: India
- Sport: Badminton
- Handedness: Right handed
- Coached by: Pullela Gopichand

Men's & mixed doubles
- Highest ranking: 50 (MD 30 August 2018); 44 (XD 9 July 2019)
- BWF profile

Saurabh Sharma (born 30 December 1997) is an Indian badminton player. He has represented India in BWF International tournaments, having won multiple mixed doubles and men's doubles tournaments. He also became the U-19 Mixed doubles champion in the junior nationals.

== Background ==
Sharma spent the early years of his life in Sonipat in Haryana. He started playing badminton at the age of eight and in 2009 he joined the Gopichand Badminton Academy for training.

== Career ==
In 2016, Sharma and Parikh won the Nepal International after defeating Venkat Gaurav Prasad and Juhi Dewangan in the final.

In 2017, Sharma and Parikh were runners-up in the Kharkiv International and South Africa International. In 2018, the pair reached the final of the Brazil International but were defeated by Russian pair of Evgenij Dremin of Evgenia Dimova.

Sharma and Parikh won the Kharkiv title in 2018 after they defeated the Polish pair of Paweł Śmiłowski of Magdalena Świerczyńska.

In the Men's doubles category he won the South Africa International in 2017, Jamaica International in 2018 and the Nepal International in 2019.

== Achievements ==
=== BWF International Challenge/Series ===
Men's doubles
Year	Tournament	Partner	Opponent	Score	Result
2016	Mauritius International	(India) Dhruv Kapila	(India) Satwiksairaj Rankireddy (India) Chirag Shetty	12–21, 16–21	(silver) Runner-up
2017	South Africa International	(India) Tarun Kona	(Mauritius) Aatish Lubah (Mauritius) Julien Paul	21–9, 21–15	(gold) Winner
2018	Iran Fajr International	(India) Tarun Kona	(India) Alwin Francis (India) K. Nandagopal	11–9, 6–11, 11–7, 8–11, 9–11	(silver) Runner-up
2018	Jamaica International	(India) Tarun Kona	(Jamaica) Gareth Henry (Jamaica) Samuel Ricketts	21–17, 21–17	(gold) Winner
2018	Brazil International	(India) Tarun Kona	(Canada) Jason Ho-Shue (Canada) Nyl Yakura	7–21 retired	(silver) Runner-up
2019	Nepal International	(India) Rohan Kapoor	(Malaysia) Izzat Farhan Azhar (Malaysia) Zachary Sia	21–10, 21–12	(gold) Winner
2019	Bahrain International	(India) Rohan Kapoor	(Thailand) Prad Tangsrirapeephan (Thailand) Apichasit Teerawiwat	21–19, 16–21, 22–24	(silver) Runner-up

Mixed doubles
Year	Tournament	Partner	Opponent	Score	Result
2016	Nepal International	(India) Anoushka Parikh	(India) Venkat Gaurav Prasad (India) Juhi Dewangan	14–21, 21–19, 21–19	(gold) Winner
2017	Kharkiv International	(India) Anoushka Parikh	(India) K. Nandagopal (India) Mahima Aggarwal	14–21, 15–21	(silver) Runner-up
2017	South Africa International	(India) Anoushka Parikh	(South Africa) Andries Malan (South Africa) Jennifer Fry	19–21, 19–21	(silver) Runner-up
2018	Brazil International	(India) Anoushka Parikh	(Russia) Evgenij Dremin (Russia) Evgenia Dimova	17–21, 14–21	(silver) Runner-up
2018	Kharkiv International	(India) Anoushka Parikh	(Poland) Paweł Śmiłowski (Poland) Magdalena Świerczyńska	18–21, 21–19, 22–20	(gold) Winner

BWF International Challenge tournament
BWF International Series tournament
BWF Future Series tournament
