= Geordine Henry =

Jamaican badminton player (born 1988)

Personal information
- Born: 21 March 1988 (age 38)
- Height: 1.64 m (5 ft 5 in)
- Weight: 68 kg (150 lb)

Sport
- Country: Jamaica
- Sport: Badminton

Women's
- Highest ranking: 385 (WS) 3 Nov 2016; 454 (WD) 27 Sep 2012; 263 (XD) 13 Sep 2012
- BWF profile

Geordine Henry (born 21 March 1988) is a Jamaican female badminton player.

== Achievements ==
=== BWF International Challenge/Series ===
Women's Doubles
Year	Tournament	Partner	Opponent	Score	Result
2014	Carebaco International	(Jamaica) Mikaylia Haldane	(Barbados) Shari Watson (Barbados) Tamisha Williams	11-21, 17–21	(silver) Runner-up
2016	Jamaica International	(Jamaica) Mikaylia Haldane	(Jamaica) Ruth Williams (Jamaica) Katherine Wynter	17-21, 21–10, 15–21	(silver) Runner-up

Mixed Doubles
Year	Tournament	Partner	Opponent	Score	Result
2011	Carebaco International	(Jamaica) Gareth Henry	(Suriname) Mitchel Wongsodikromo (Suriname) Crystal Leefmans	17-21, 11–21	(silver) Runner-up
2013	Carebaco International	(Jamaica) Gareth Henry	(Guatemala) Anibal Marroquin (Guatemala) Krisley López	16-21, 19–21	(silver) Runner-up

BWF International Challenge tournament
BWF International Series tournament
BWF Future Series tournament
