= Bradley Graham =

Brad or Bradley Graham may refer to:

- Brad Graham (born 2001), English professional rugby league player
- Bradley Graham, American bookseller and co-owner of Politics and Prose
