= Nigella Saunders =

Jamaican badminton player (born 1979)

Personal information
- Born: December 7, 1979 (age 46) Kingston, Jamaica

Sport
- Sport: Badminton
- Handedness: Right
- BWF profile
Medal record
Representing Jamaica
Women's badminton
Pan American Games
Gold medal – first place	Santo Domingo 2003	Women's singles
Bronze medal – third place	Santo Domingo 2003	Mixed doubles

Nigella Jekyll Saunders (born 7 December 1979) is a female badminton player from Jamaica, who won two medals (gold and bronze) at the 2003 Pan American Games. Saunders played badminton at the 2004 Summer Olympics, losing to Mia Audina of the Netherlands in the round of 32. In her home country, she won more than a dozen titles at the Jamaican National Badminton Championships.
