= Ruth Williams (badminton) =

Jamaican badminton player

Personal information
- Born: 31 August 1989 (age 37) Mandeville, Jamaica
- Height: 1.57 m (5 ft 2 in)
- Weight: 59 kg (130 lb)

Sport
- Country: Jamaica
- Sport: Badminton

Women's
- Highest ranking: 361 (WS) 17 Sep 2015; 232 (WD) 14 Aug 2014; 283 (XD) 28 Apr 2016
- BWF profile

Ruth Williams (born 31 August 1989) is a Jamaican female badminton player. In 2014, he competed at the Commonwealth Games in Glasgow, Scotland. In 2015, he competed at the Pan Am Games in Toronto, Canada. In 2016, she won the Jamaica International tournament in the women's doubles event partnered with Katherine Wynter.

== Achievements ==
=== BWF International Challenge/Series ===
Women's Doubles
Year	Tournament	Partner	Opponent	Score	Result
2016	Jamaica International	(Jamaica) Katherine Wynter	(Jamaica) Henry Geordine (Jamaica) Mikaylia Haldane	21-17, 10–21, 21–15	(gold) Winner

BWF International Challenge tournament
BWF International Series tournament
BWF Future Series tournament
