= Katherine Wynter =

Jamaican badminton player (born 1996)

Personal information
- Born: 9 February 1996 (age 30) Kingston, Jamaica
- Height: 1.68 m (5 ft 6 in)
- Weight: 58 kg (128 lb)

Sport
- Country: Jamaica
- Sport: Badminton

Women's singles & doubles
- Highest ranking: 227 (WS 21 December 2017); 232 (WD 14 August 2014); 149 (XD 30 November 2017)
- BWF profile
Medal record
Women's badminton
Representing Jamaica
Pan Am Championships
Bronze medal – third place	2016 Campinas	Mixed doubles
Central American and Caribbean Games
Bronze medal – third place	2023 San Salvador	Women's doubles
Bronze medal – third place	2023 San Salvador	Mixed team

Katherine Wynter (born 9 February 1996) is a Jamaican badminton player. She won the 2016 Jamaica International tournament in the women's doubles event partnered with Ruth Williams. Wynter was the bronze medalists in the mixed doubles at the 2016 Pan Am Badminton Championships partnered with Dennis Coke, and also in the team event and women's doubles at the 2023 Central American and Caribbean Games. She competed at the 2018 and 2022 Commonwealth Games.

== Personal life ==
Wynter educated at the University of the West Indies in Mona, and was awarded University Sportswoman of the Year in 2015 and 2016.

== Achievements ==
=== Pan Am Championships ===
Mixed doubles
Year	Venue	Partner	Opponent	Score	Result
2016	Clube Fonte São Paulo; Campinas, Brazil	(Jamaica) Dennis Coke	(Canada) Nyl Yakura (Canada) Brittney Tam	11–21, 9–21	Bronze

=== Central American and Caribbean Games ===
Women's doubles
Year	Venue	Partner	Opponent	Score	Result
2023	Coliseo Complejo El Polvorín; San Salvador, El Salvador	(Jamaica) Tahlia Richardson	Diana Corleto; Nikté Sotomayor	13–21, 16–21	Bronze

=== BWF International Challenge/Series ===
Women's doubles
Year	Tournament	Partner	Opponent	Score	Result
2016	Jamaica International	(Jamaica) Ruth Williams	(Jamaica) Geordine Henry (Jamaica) Mikaylia Haldane	21–17, 10–21, 21–15	(gold) Winner
2016	Carebaco International	(Jamaica) Mikaylia Haldane	(Dominican Republic) Nairoby Jiménez (Dominican Republic) Bermary Polanco	17–21, 23–21, 15–21	(silver) Runner-up
2017	Jamaica International	(Jamaica) Mikaylia Haldane	(Australia) Leanne Choo (Canada) Rachel Honderich	2–21, 8–21	(silver) Runner-up

Mixed doubles
Year	Tournament	Partner	Opponent	Score	Result
2015	Carebaco International	(Jamaica) Gareth Henry	(Dominican Republic) Nelson Javier (Dominican Republic) Daigenis Saturria	17–21, 19–21	(silver) Runner-up
2017	Jamaica International	(Jamaica) Dennis Coke	(Canada) Toby Ng (Canada) Rachel Honderich	9–21, 8–21	(silver) Runner-up
2017	Peru International	(Jamaica) Dennis Coke	(Peru) Mario Cuba (Peru) Katherine Winder	9–21, 9–21	(silver) Runner-up
2017	Suriname International	(Jamaica) Dennis Coke	(Cuba) Leodannis Martínez (Cuba) Taymara Oropesa	16–21, 18–21	(silver) Runner-up
2018	Suriname International	(Suriname) Mitchel Wongsodikromo	(Dominican Republic) César Brito (Dominican Republic) Bermary Polanco	10–21, 16–21	(silver) Runner-up

BWF International Challenge tournament
BWF International Series tournament
BWF Future Series tournament
