= Jamaica International =

The Jamaica International is an open international badminton tournament in Jamaica. This tournament established since 1970s, thus making this as one of the oldest badminton tournament in the Caribbean. The tournament has been an International Series level.

== Previous Winners ==
Year	Men's singles	Women's singles	Men's doubles	Women's doubles	Mixed doubles	Ref
1971	(Mexico) Roy Díaz González	(Jamaica) Margaret Parslow	(Jamaica) Anthony Garcia (Canada) Jamie Paulson	(Jamaica) Barbara Lai (Jamaica) Annie Lowe	(Canada) Jamie Paulson (Jamaica) Jennifer Haddad	
1972	(Canada) Jamie Paulson	(Canada) Nancy McKinley	(Canada) Yves Paré (Canada) Jamie Paulson	(Canada) Nancy McKinley (United States) Pam Stockton	(Mexico) Roy Díaz González (United States) Pam Stockton	
1973	(Sweden) Sture Johnsson	(England) Margaret Beck	(Canada) Yves Paré (Canada) Jamie Paulson	(England) Margaret Beck (England) Bridget Cooper	(Sweden) Sture Johnsson (Sweden) Eva Twedberg	
1974	(Sweden) Sture Johnsson	(Jamaica) Jennifer Haddad	(Indonesia) Ade Chandra (Indonesia) Herman	(Jamaica) Jennifer Haddad (Jamaica) Norma Haddad	(Jamaica) Robert Richards (Jamaica) Jennifer Haddad	
1975	(Denmark) Flemming Delfs	(Denmark) Lene Køppen	(England) Ray Stevens (England) Mike Tredgett	(Denmark) Lene Køppen (Netherlands) Joke van Beusekom	(Denmark) Elo Hansen (Denmark) Lene Køppen	
1976	(Sweden) Willy Nilsson	(Canada) Lesley Harris	(Sweden) Stefan Karlsson (Sweden) Claes Nordin	(Canada) Pauline Delisle (Canada) Lesley Harris	(Canada) Lucio Fabris (Canada) Pauline Delisle	
1977– 1981	No competition					
1982	(Peru) Federico Valdez	(Jamaica) Marie Leyow	(Peru) Federico Valdez (Peru) Germán Valdez	(Jamaica) Marie Leyow (Jamaica) Judy Ziadie	(Jamaica) Robert Richards (Jamaica) Marie Leyow	
1983– 1998	No competition					
1999	(United States) Kevin Han	(Canada) Kara Solmundson	(United States) Howard Bach (United States) Mark Manha	(Jamaica) Shackerah Cupidon (Jamaica) Nigella Saunders	(Canada) Mike Beres (Canada) Kara Solmundson	
2000– 2014	No competition					
2015	(Canada) Martin Giuffre	(Turkey) Ebru Tunalı	(Guatemala) Rodolfo Ramírez (Guatemala) Jonathan Solís	(Turkey) Cemre Fere (Turkey) Ebru Tunalı	(Turkey) Ramazan Öztürk (Turkey) Neslihan Kılıç	
2016	(Portugal) Pedro Martins	(Italy) Jeanine Cicognini	(Belgium) Matijs Dierickx (Belgium) Freek Golinski	(Jamaica) Ruth Williams (Jamaica) Katherine Wynter	(Austria) David Obernosterer (Austria) Elisabeth Baldauf	
2017	(Denmark) Søren Toft	(Canada) Rachel Honderich	(India) Venkatesh Prasad (India) Jagadish Yadav	(Australia) Leanne Choo (Canada) Rachel Honderich	(Canada) Toby Ng (Canada) Rachel Honderich	
2018	(Canada) Jason Ho-Shue	(United States) Jamie Hsu	(India) Tarun Kona (India) Saurabh Sharma	(United States) Jamie Hsu (United States) Jamie Subandhi	(Cuba) Osleni Guerrero (Cuba) Yeily Ortiz	
2019	(Japan) Kodai Naraoka	(Wales) Jordan Hart	(Guatemala) Jonathan Solís (Guatemala) Rudolfo Ramírez	(United States) Breanna Chi (United States) Jennie Gai	(Brazil) Artur Pomoceno (Brazil) Lohaynny Vicente	
2020	(Japan) Takuma Obayashi	(Japan) Momoka Kimura	(Guatemala) Aníbal Marroquín (Guatemala) Jonathan Solís	(Japan) Sayaka Hobara (Japan) Rena Miyaura	(Guatemala) Jonathan Solís (Guatemala) Diana Corleto	
2021– 2025	No competition					
2026	(Switzerland) Julien Scheiwiller	(Peru) Inés Castillo	(India) Sai Pratheek K. (India) Ruban Kumar	(United States) Sydney Li (United States) Katelin Ngo	(Jamaica) Joel Angus (Jamaica) Tahlia Richardson	

== Performances by nation ==
As of 2026 edition

Top Nations
Pos	Nation	MS	WS	MD	WD	XD	Total
1	Canada	3	4	2.5	2	3.5	15
2	Jamaica*		3	0.5	5	3.5	12
3	United States	1	1	1	3.5	0.5	7
4	Sweden	3		1		1	5
5	Denmark	2	1		0.5	1	4.5
6	Guatemala			3		1	4
6	Japan	2	1		1		4
8	England		1	1	1		3
8	India			3			3
8	Peru	1	1	1			3
8	Turkey		1		1	1	3
12	Mexico	1				0.5	1.5
13	Austria					1	1
13	Belgium			1			1
13	Brazil					1	1
13	Cuba					1	1
13	Indonesia			1			1
13	Italy		1				1
13	Portugal	1					1
13	Switzerland	1					1
13	Wales		1				1
22	Australia				0.5		0.5
22	Netherlands				0.5		0.5
Total		15	15	15	15	15	75

* Host nation
