= Cycling at the 2023 Pan American Games – Qualification =

The following is the qualification system and qualified countries for the cycling at the 2023 Pan American Games competition in Santiago, Chile.

== Qualification system ==
A total of 283 cyclists (142 men and 141 women) will qualify to compete. 187 will qualify in road/track, 36 in mountain biking and 60 in BMX. Various events and rankings were used to determine the qualifiers. A nation could enter a maximum of 34 athletes, four in mountain biking (two per gender), six in BMX (three per gender) 18 in track (nine per gender) and six in road (three per gender). Chile as host nation, was automatically awarded the maximum quota of 34 spots.

Event	Men	Women	Total
BMX racing	21	21	42
BMX freestyle	9	9	18
Mountain Biking	18	18	36
Road+Track	94	93	187
Total athletes	142	141	283

== Qualification timeline ==
Event	Date	Venue
BMX
2021 Junior Pan American Games	November 25 – December 5	Cali, Colombia
UCI Individual Ranking (racing)	December 31, 2022	–
UCI Individual Ranking (freestyle)	May 31, 2023	–
Mountain Bike
2021 Junior Pan American Games	November 25 – December 5	Cali, Colombia
2022 South American Games	October 2	Asunción, Paraguay
2023 Pan American Continental Championship	April 26–30	(Brazil) Congonhas
2023 Central American and Caribbean Games	June 23 – July 8	San Salvador, El Salvador
Road/Track
2021 Junior Pan American Games	November 25 – December 5	Cali, Colombia
2022 South American Games	October 1–15, 2022	Asunción, Paraguay
2022 Central American Road Cycling Championships	October 14–16	Various cities, Costa Rica
2022 Caribbean Road Cycling Championships	October 21–22	Various cities, Dominican Republic
2023 Pan American Road Cycling Championship	April 18–23	Panama
2023 Pan American Track Cycling Championships	June 14–18	San Juan, Argentina
UCI Ranking	March 31, 2023	–

== Qualification summary ==
A total of 26 countries qualified cyclists so far as of July 12, 2023.

Nation	BMX		Freestyle		Mountain		Road/Track		Total		
Nation	Men	Women	Men	Women	Men	Women	Men	Women	Men	Women	Total
Argentina	2	3	1	1	2	2	10	5	15	11	26
Aruba		2							0	2	2
Barbados								1	0	1	1
Bermuda							2		2	0	2
Bolivia	2	2							2	2	4
Brazil	2	2	1	1	2	2	5	7	10	12	22
Canada	2	2			2	2	11	11	15	15	30
Chile	2	2	1	1	3	2	12	12	18	17	35
Colombia	3	2	1	1	2	3	12	14	18	20	38
Costa Rica			1		2	1	3	3	6	4	10
Cuba								2	0	2	2
Dominican Republic							1	1	1	1	2
Ecuador	2	2					2	1	4	3	7
Guatemala						1	2		2	1	3
Honduras					1				1	0	1
Jamaica								2	0	2	2
Mexico			1	1	2	2	9	12	12	15	27
Panama							1		1	0	1
Paraguay				1				1	0	2	2
Peru	2	2	1	1			1		4	3	7
Puerto Rico					1				1	0	1
Suriname							2	1	2	1	3
Trinidad and Tobago							4	2	4	2	6
United States	2	2	1	1		2	9	11	12	16	28
Uruguay							3	1	3	1	4
Venezuela	2		1	1			4	6	7	7	14
Total: 26 NOCs	21	21	9	9	18	18	93	93	141	141	282

== BMX ==
=== Racing ===
A maximum of 21 male and 21 female athletes will be allowed to compete in BMX racing. The host nation (Chile) automatically receives the maximum of two quota spots per event, and all other nations may qualify a maximum of two athletes per event. Qualification will be done using the 2021 Junior Pan American Games and the UCI rankings as of December 31, 2022.

==== Men ====
Event	Quotas	Athlete total	Qualified
Host nation	2	2	Chile
2021 Junior Pan American Games	1	1	Mateo Carmona (COL)
UCI World Ranking of Nations	2	18	Colombia; United States; Argentina; Brazil; Ecuador; Canada; Venezuela; Bolivia; Peru
Total		21	

==== Women ====
Event	Quotas	Athlete total	Qualified
Host nation	2	2	Chile
2021 Junior Pan American Games	1	1	Agustina Cavalli (ARG)
UCI World Ranking of Nations	2	12	Colombia; United States; Brazil; Canada; Ecuador; ~~Aruba~~; ~~Argentina~~; Bolivia; ~~Peru~~
UCI World Ranking of Nations	1	4	Aruba; Guatemala; Paraguay; Peru
Total		19	

- Argentina declined two quotas and Aruba and Peru declined one quota each, for an available four additional quotas. These were redistributed to Guatemala (1 quota) and Paraguay (1 quota).

=== Freestyle ===
A maximum of nine male and nine female athletes will be allowed to compete in BMX freestyle. The host nation (Chile) automatically receives the maximum one quota spot per event, and all other nations may qualify a maximum of one athlete per event. All qualification will be done using the UCI rankings as of May 31, 2023.

==== Men ====
Event	Quotas	Qualified
Host nation	1	Chile
UCI World Rankings	8	United States; Argentina; Costa Rica; Venezuela; Brazil; Mexico; Peru; Colombia
Total	9	

==== Women ====
Event	Quotas	Qualified
Host nation	1	Chile
UCI World Rankings	8	United States; Colombia; Argentina; Brazil; Venezuela; Peru; Paraguay; Mexico
Total	9	

== Mountain biking ==
A maximum of 18 male and 18 female athletes will be allowed to compete in mountain biking. The host nation (Chile) automatically receives the maximum two quota spot per event, and all other nations may qualify a maximum of two athletes per event. Qualification will be done across four tournaments.

=== Men ===
Event	Quotas	Qualified
Host nation	2	Chile; Chile
2021 Junior Pan American Games	1	Martín Vidaurre (CHI)
2022 South American Games	1	Brazil
2023 Pan American Championships	13	Mexico; Canada; Argentina; Brazil; Canada; Colombia; Puerto Rico; Costa Rica; Colombia; Argentina; Honduras; Mexico; Costa Rica
2023 Central American and Caribbean Games	0	—
Reallocation	1	Peru
Total	18	

=== Women ===
Event	Quotas	Qualified
Host nation	2	Chile; Chile
2021 Junior Pan American Games	1	Angie Lara (COL)
2022 South American Games	1	Brazil
2023 Pan American Championships	13	United States; United States; Brazil; Mexico; Canada; Colombia; Mexico; Canada; Costa Rica; Argentina; Colombia; Argentina; Guatemala
2023 Central American and Caribbean Games	1	Costa Rica
Total	18	

== Road/Track ==
A maximum of 94 male and 93 female athletes will be allowed to compete in the road and track cycling events. The host nation (Chile) automatically receives the maximum 24 quotas (12 men and 12 women), and all other nations may qualify a maximum of 24 cyclists as well. Qualification was done across six tournaments and the UCI Rankings of March 31, 2023. A nation qualified in team events in track cycling, cannot qualify additional athletes in the individual events.

=== Men ===
==== Track ====
Team sprint

Event	Quota(s)	Qualified NOC	Athletes per NOC
Host nation	1	Chile	3
South American Games	1	Colombia	3
Pan American Ranking	1	Canada	3
Pan American Championships	3	Trinidad and Tobago; Mexico; United States	3
Total	6		18

Sprint

Event	Quota(s)	Qualified NOC	Athletes per NOC
Qualified sprint teams	12	Canada; Chile; Colombia; Trinidad and Tobago; Mexico; United States	Up to 2*
Junior American Games	1	Cristian Ortega (COL)	1
South American Games	1	Argentina	1
Pan American Ranking	1	Venezuela*	1
Pan American Championships	2	Suriname; Brazil	1
Total	17		5

- Team sprint quotas do not add additional athletes and are not included in the total.
- Ranking quota was reallocated as Trinidad and Tobago later qualified a sprint team.

Keirin

Event	Quota(s)	Qualified NOC	Athletes per NOC
Qualified sprint teams	6	Canada; Chile; Colombia; Trinidad and Tobago; Mexico; United States	1*
Junior American Games	1	Cristian Ortega (COL)*	1
South American Games	1	Argentina	1
Pan American Ranking	1	Venezuela*	1
Pan American Championships	2	Suriname; Brazil	1
Total	11		4

- Team sprint quotas do not add additional athletes and are not included in the total.
- Cristian David Ortega Fontalvo already qualified in the men's sprint, and his athlete total is not included in Keirin.
- Ranking quota was reallocated as Trinidad and Tobago later qualified a sprint team.

Team pursuit

Event	Quota(s)	Qualified NOC	Athletes per NOC
Host nation	1	Chile	4
South American Games	1	Colombia	4
Pan American Ranking	1	Canada	4
Pan American Championships	3	United States; Mexico; Argentina	4
Total	6		24

Madison

Event	Quota(s)	Qualified NOC	Athletes per NOC
Host nation	1	Chile	2
South American Games	1	Argentina	2
Pan American Ranking	1	United States	2
Pan American Championships	3	Mexico; Canada; Colombia	2
Total	6		12

Omnium

Event	Quota(s)	Qualified NOC	Athletes per NOC
Qualified pursuit teams	6	Chile; Colombia; Canada; United States; Mexico; Argentina	1*
Junior American Games	1	Anderson Arboleda (COL)	1
South American Games	1	Peru*	1
Pan American Ranking	1	Trinidad and Tobago*	1
Pan American Championships	2	Brazil; Venezuela	1
Total	11		5

- Team pursuit quotas do not add additional athletes and are not included in the total.
- Ranking and South American Games quotas were reallocated as the United States and Argentina later qualified pursuit teams.

==== Road ====
Event	Quota(s)	Qualified NOC
Host nation road race	2	Chile; Chile
Host nation time trial	1	Chile
Central American Championships road race	1	Guatemala
Caribbean	1	Dominican Republic
Junior Pan American Games road race	1	Gabriel Rojas (CRC)
Junior Pan American Games time trial	1	Victor Ocampo (COL)
Pan American Championships road race	13	Canada; Argentina; Canada; Uruguay; Ecuador; Brazil; Costa Rica; Guatemala; Brazil; Costa Rica; Venezuela; Uruguay; Bermuda
Pan American Championships time trial	6	Colombia; Bermuda; Uruguay; Panama; Argentina; Ecuador
Total	26	

=== Women ===
==== Track ====
Team sprint

Event	Quota(s)	Qualified NOC	Athletes per NOC
Host nation	1	Chile	3
South American Games	1	Colombia	3
Pan American Ranking	1	Canada	3
Pan American Championships	3	Mexico; United States; Argentina	3
Total	6		18

Sprint

Event	Quota(s)	Qualified NOC	Athletes per NOC
Qualified sprint teams	12	Chile; Colombia; Canada; Mexico; United States; Argentina	Up to 2*
Junior American Games	1	Marianis Salazar (COL)	1
South American Games	1	Venezuela	1
Pan American Ranking	1	Jamaica	1
Pan American Championships	2	Brazil; Costa Rica	1
Total	17		5

- Team sprint quotas do not add additional athletes and are not included in the total.

Keirin

Event	Quota(s)	Qualified NOC	Athletes per NOC
Qualified sprint teams	6	Chile; Colombia; Canada; Mexico; United States; Argentina	1*
Junior American Games	1	Marianis Salazar (COL)*	1
South American Games	1	Venezuela	1
Pan American Ranking	1	Jamaica	1
Pan American Championships	2	Brazil; Suriname	1
Total	11		4

- Team sprint quotas do not add additional athletes and are not included in the total.
- Marianis Salazar Sanchez already qualified in the men's sprint, and her athlete total is not included in the keirin.

Team pursuit

Event	Quota(s)	Qualified NOC	Athletes per NOC
Host nation	1	Chile	4
South American Games	1	Colombia	4
Pan American Ranking	1	Canada	4
Pan American Championships	3	Mexico; United States; Venezuela	4
Total	6		24

Madison

Event	Quota(s)	Qualified NOC	Athletes per NOC
Host nation	1	Chile	2
South American Games	1	Colombia	2
Pan American Ranking	1	United States	2
Pan American Championships	3	Canada; Mexico; Brazil	2
Total	6		12

Omnium

Event	Quota(s)	Qualified NOC	Athletes per NOC
Qualified pursuit teams	6	Chile; Colombia; Canada; Mexico; United States; Argentina	1*
Junior American Games	1	Lina Hernández (COL)	1
South American Games	1	Brazil	1
Pan American Ranking	1	Barbados	1
Pan American Championships	2	Trinidad and Tobago; Argentina	1
Total	11		4

- Lina Marcela Hernández Gomez already qualified in the women's road cycling events, and her athlete total is not included in the Ominium.

==== Road ====
Event	Quota(s)	Qualified NOC
Host nation road race	2	Chile; Chile
Host nation time trial	1	Chile
Central American Championships road race	1	Costa Rica
Caribbean	1	Cuba
Junior Pan American Games road race	1	Yareli Acevedo (MEX)
Junior Pan American Games time trial	1	Lina Hernández (COL)
Pan American Championships road race	13	United States; Canada; Colombia; Brazil; Colombia; Mexico; Brazil; Costa Rica; Cuba; Uruguay; Dominican Republic; Argentina; Ecuador
Pan American Championships time trial	6	United States; Canada; Paraguay; Trinidad and Tobago; Colombia; Mexico
Total	26	

== See also ==
- Cycling at the 2024 Summer Olympics – Qualification
