= Jamaica at the 2011 Pan American Games =

- IOC code: JAM
- NOC: Jamaica Olympic Association

in Guadalajara 14–30 October 2011
- Competitors: 58 in 10 sports
- Flag bearer: Marloe Rodman
- Medals Ranked 14th: Gold 1 Silver 5 Bronze 1 Total 7

Pan American Games appearances (overview)
- 1951; 1955; 1959; 1963; 1967; 1971; 1975; 1979; 1983; 1987; 1991; 1995; 1999; 2003; 2007; 2011; 2015; 2019; 2023; 2027

Jamaica competed at the 2011 Pan American Games in Guadalajara, Mexico from October 14–30, 2011, with 58 athletes in 10 sports.

== Medalists ==
Medal	Name	Sport	Event	Date
Gold	Lerone Clarke	Athletics	Men's 100 metres	October 25
Silver	Alia Atkinson	Swimming	Women's 200 metre individual medley	October 18
Silver	Maurice Smith	Athletics	Men's decathlon	October 25
Silver	Lansford Spence	Athletics	Men's 200 metres	October 27
Silver	Simone Facey	Athletics	Women's 200 metres	October 27
Silver	Isa Phillips	Athletics	Men's 400 metres hurdles	October 27
Bronze	Charles Pyne	Badminton	Men's singles	October 18

== Athletics ==
=== Men ===
Track and road events

Event	Athletes	Heats		Semifinal		Final	
Event	Athletes	Time	Rank	Time	Rank	Time	Rank
100 m	Oshane Bailey	10.41	3rd q	DSQ		Did not advance	
100 m	Lerone Clarke	10.15	1st Q	10.17	1st Q	10.01 PB	1st place, gold medalist(s)
200 m	Jason Livermore	20.73 SB	2nd Q	20.76	3rd	Did not advance	
200 m	Lansford Spence	20.59	1st Q	20.33 PB	1st Q	20.38	2nd place, silver medalist(s)
400 m	Michael Mason			46.09	3rd	Did not advance	
400 m	Annert Whyte			47.57	6th	Did not advance	
110 m hurdles	Eric Keddo			13.83	6th	Did not advance	
400 m hurdles	Isa Phillips			49.62	1st Q	48.82	2nd place, silver medalist(s)
4 × 100 m relay	Jermaine Hamilton; Jason Livermore; Hannukkah Wallace; Oshane Bailey			DSQ		Did not advance	
4 × 400 m relay	Michael Mason; Omar Johnson; Annert Whyte; Jason Livermore			3:10.05	3rd Q	DNS	

Field events

Event	Athletes	Semifinal		Final	
Event	Athletes	Result	Rank	Result	Rank
Pole vault	Jabari Ennis			4.90 m.	10th
Long jump	Herbert McGregor	7.46 m.	8th	Did not advance	
Shot put	Odayne Richards			DNS	
Discus throw	Jason Morgan			58.91 m.	10th
Discus throw	Odayne Richards			DNS	

Combined events

Decathlon	Event	Clanston Bernard			Maurice Smith		
Decathlon	Event	Results	Points	Rank	Results	Points	Rank
	100 m	11.16	825	11th	10.86	892	7th
	Long jump	7.09 m.	835	7th	7.36 m.	900	4th
	Shot put	13.55 m.	701	8th	17.35 m.	935	1st
	High jump	1.96 m.	767	6th	1.99 m.	794	5th
	400 m	52.00	725	12th	49.26	849	5th
	110 m hurdles	14.92	859	9th	14.20	949	1st
	Discus throw	43.79 m.	742	4th	48.79 m.	845	1st
	Pole vault	4.20 m.	673	8th	4.40 m.	731	5th
	Javelin throw	55.49 m.	670	10th	59.57 m.	731	3rd
	1500 m	5:20.11	449	11th	4:55.18	588	8th
Final			7246	8th		8214	2nd place, silver medalist(s)

=== Women ===
Track and road events

Event	Athletes	Semifinal		Final	
Event	Athletes	Time	Rank	Time	Rank
200 m	Simone Facey	22.99 PB	2nd Q	22.86 PB	2nd place, silver medalist(s)
200 m	Anastasia Le-Roy	23.68	5th	Did not advance	
400 m	Patricia Hall	52.47	3rd Q	52.69	7th
400 m hurdles	Rushell Clayton	1:03.44	6th	Did not advance	
400 m hurdles	Sheryl Morgan	59.59	5th	Did not advance	
4 × 100 m relay	Ornella Livingston; Anastasia Le-Roy; Simone Facey; Yanique Ellington			DNF	
4 × 400 m relay	Rushell Clayton; Sheryl Morgan; Anastasia Le-Roy; Patricia Hall; Yanique Ellington			DNS	

Field events

Event	Athletes	Semifinal		Final	
Event	Athletes	Result	Rank	Result	Rank
High jump	Kimberley Williamson			1.78 m.	8th
Long jump	Yanique Levy			5.81 m.	12th
Long jump	Nickevea Wilson			5.44 m.	13th
Shot put	Zara Northover			16.64 PB	6th
Discus throw	Allinson Randall			50.90 m.	9th
Hammer throw	Natalie Grant			57.73 m.	13th
Javelin throw	Olivia McKoy			51.40 m.	7th
Javelin throw	Kateema Riettie			50.97 m.	8th

== Badminton ==
Jamaica has qualified two male and two female athletes in the badminton competition.

Men

Athlete	Event	First round	Second round	Third round	Quarterfinals	Semifinals	Final	Rank
Athlete	Event	Opposition Result	Opposition Result	Opposition Result	Opposition Result	Opposition Result	Opposition Result	Rank
Gareth Henry	Men's singles	BYE	P Yang (GUA); L 0–2 (19–21, 20–22)	Did not advance				
Charles Pyne	Men's singles	BYE	K Matute (VEN); W 2–0 (21–9, 21–9)	R Pacheco (PER); W 2–1 (21–23, 21–17, 21–10)	A Tjong (BRA); W 2–1 (21–14, 19–21, 21–19)	O Guerrero (CUB); L 1–2 (18–21, 21–18, 18–21)	DNA	3rd place, bronze medalist(s)
Gareth Henry; Charles Pyne	Men's doubles			H Bach (USA); T Gunawan (USA); L 0–2 (12–21, 5–21)	Did not advance			

Women

Athlete	Event	First round	Second round	Third round	Quarterfinals	Semifinals	Final	Rank
Athlete	Event	Opposition Result	Opposition Result	Opposition Result	Opposition Result	Opposition Result	Opposition Result	Rank
Katherine Wynter	Women's singles	BYE	V Montero (MEX); L 0–2 (7–21, 3–21)	Did not advance				
Mikaylia Haldane	Women's singles	BYE	L Vicente (BRA); L 0–2 (17–21, 7–21)	Did not advance				
Mikaylia Haldane; Katherine Wynter	Women's doubles		BYE	O Cabrera (DOM); B Vibieca (DOM); L 1–2 (21–17, 17–21, 14–21)	Did not advance			

Mixed

Athlete	Event	First round	Second round	Quarterfinals	Semifinals	Final	Rank
Athlete	Event	Opposition Result	Opposition Result	Opposition Result	Opposition Result	Opposition Result	Rank
Gareth Henry; Mikaylia Haldane	Mixed doubles	C Araya (CHI); C Macaya (CHI); W 2–0 (21–15, 21–15)	L Muñoz (MEX); C González (MEX); W 2–0 (21–14, 21–19)	H Bach (USA); P Obañana (USA); L 0–2 (9–21, 11–21)	Did not advance		
Charles Pyne; Katherine Wynter	Mixed doubles	E Mujica (CHI); N Norambuena (CHI); W 2–0 (21–19, 21–17)	H Humblers (GUA); N Sotomayor (GUA); L 0–2 (19–21, 11–21)	Did not advance			

== Basketball ==
Women

Team

- Shereel Brown
- Zandria Dell
- Nicole Dias
- Sasha Dixon
- Stacian Facey
- Melissa Farquharson
- Loretta Gordon
- Simone Jackson
- Tracey-Ann Kelly
- Ladonna Lamonth
- Shnell Moodie

Standings

Pos	Team	Pld	W	L	PF	PA	PD	Pts	Qualification
1	Brazil	3	3	0	280	140	+140	6	Advance to Semifinals
2	Colombia	3	2	1	195	169	+26	5	Advance to Semifinals
3	Canada	3	1	2	206	166	+40	4	
4	Jamaica	3	0	3	89	295	−206	3	

Results

October 21
17:30

Report

Jamaica	26–83	Colombia
Scoring by quarter: 7–20, 5–14, 12–15, 2–34
Pts: Brown, 10; Rebs: Dixon, 8 Asts: 2 players, 2		Pts: Mosquera, 21; Rebs: 2 players, 6 Asts: Olarte, 5

CODE Dome, Guadalajara

October 22
10:30

Report

Brazil	116–34	Jamaica
Scoring by quarter: 25–2, 27–9, 30–11, 34–12
Pts: De Souza, 22; Rebs: De Souza, 15; Asts: De Queiroz, 9		Pts: Jackson, 13; Rebs: Brown, 7 Asts: 2 players, 1

CODE Dome, Guadalajara

October 23
17:30

Report

Canada	96–29	Jamaica
Scoring by quarter: 17–8, 32–6, 20–13, 27–2
Pts: Colley, 16; Rebs: Wolfram, 11; Asts: 6 players, 3		Pts: Dixon, 13; Rebs: Dixon, 7 Asts: 3 players, 1

CODE Dome, Guadalajara

Seventh place match

October 24
10:30

Report

United States	87–41	Jamaica
Scoring by quarter: 24–11, 28–6, 19–15, 16–9
Pts: James, 19; Rebs: 2 players, 10; Asts: 2 players, 5		Pts: Jackson, 19; Rebs: Jackson, 10; Asts: Dell, 2

CODE Dome, Guadalajara

2011 Pan American Games Bronze medal

Jamaica

== Beach volleyball ==
Jamaica has qualified a men's team in the beach volleyball competition.

Athlete	Event	Preliminary round			Quarterfinals	Semifinals	Finals	
Athlete	Event	Opposition Score	Opposition Score	Opposition Score	Opposition Score	Opposition Score	Opposition Score	Rank
Dellan Brown; Namarie Gordon	Men	Santiago Etchegaray (ARG); Pablo Miguel Suárez (ARG); L 13-21, 9-21	Erick Garrido (GUA); Andy Leonardo (JAM); L 9-21, 15-21	Roberto Rodríguez (PUR); Christopher Underwood (PUR); L 11-21, 13-21	Did not advance			

== Boxing ==
=== Men ===
Athlete	Event	Preliminaries	Quarterfinals	Semifinals	Final
Athlete	Event	Opposition Result	Opposition Result	Opposition Result	Opposition Result
Reece Shagourie	Middleweight	Juan Carlos Rodríguez (VEN); L 10 – 16	Did not advance		

== Cycling ==
=== Road Cycling ===
Men

Athlete	Event	Time	Rank
Marlor Rodman	Road race	DNF	

== Shooting ==
Men

Event	Athlete	Qualification		Final	
Event	Athlete	Score	Rank	Score	Rank
10 m air pistol	Ronald Brown	548- 5x	30th	Did not advance	
Trap	Shaun Barnes	101	27th	Did not advance	

== Squash ==
=== Men ===
Athlete	Event	Round of 32	Round of 16	Quarterfinals	Semifinals	Final
Athlete	Event	Opposition Score	Opposition Score	Opposition Score	Opposition Score	Opposition Score
Christopher Binnie	Singles	José Méndez (GUA); W 11-5, 11-4, 13-11	Christopher Gordon (USA); L 7-11, 5-11, 5-13	Did not advance		

== Swimming ==
Women

Event	Athletes	Heats		Final	
Event	Athletes	Time	Position	Time	Position
100 m Freestyle	Kendese Nangle	DNS		Did not advance	
100 m Backstroke	Kendese Nangle	1:07.47	19th	Did not advance	
100 m Breaststroke	Alia Atkinson	1:09.28	3rd Q	1:09.11	4th
200 m Breaststroke	Alia Atkinson	2:32.33	4th Q	2:30.96	4th
100 m Butterfly	Alia Atkinson	1:01.41	6th Q	1:01.17	7th
200 m Individual Medley	Alia Atkinson	2:18.04	2nd Q	2:14.75	2nd place, silver medalist(s)
200 m Individual Medley	Zara Bailey	2:28.38	16th qB	2:26.84	6th B
400 m Individual Medley	Zara Bailey	5:19.46	15th qB	5:17.72	6th B

== Taekwondo ==
Jamaica has qualified two athletes in the 68 kg and 80+kg men's categories.

Men

Athlete	Event	Round of 16	Quarterfinals	Semifinals	Final
Athlete	Event	Opposition Result	Opposition Result	Opposition Result	Opposition Result
Nicholos Dusard	Lightweight (-68kg)	Diogo Da Silva (BRA); L 5 – 8	Did not advance		
Kenneth Edwards	Lightweight (+80kg)	David Rajjab (GUY); W 12 – 6	Françoise Colombe (CAN); L 3 – 15	Did not advance	
