= Ornella =

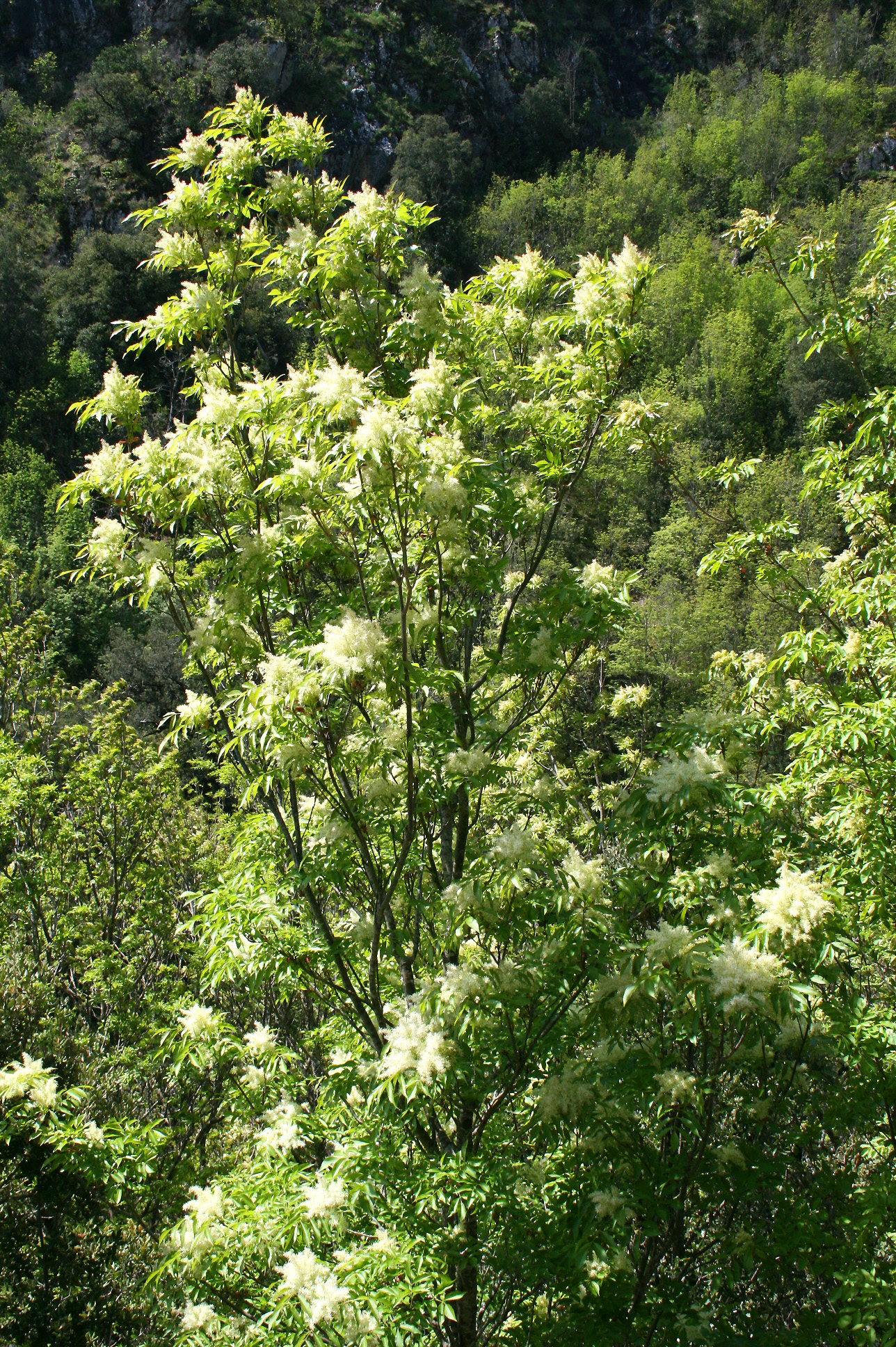
- A flowering ash
- Pronunciation: Italian: [orˈnɛlla]
- Gender: feminine
- Language: Italian

Origin
- Meaning: Fraxinus ornus

Other names
- Variant form: Ornelia

Ornella is an Italian feminine given name, probably derived from ornello, "flowering ash tree" (Fraxinus ornus). It was coined by Gabriele D'Annunzio in his 1904 play The Daughter of Iorio and popularized by the fame of singer Ornella Vanoni and, later, of actress Ornella Muti. It is most widespread in central and northern Italy, as well as in Abruzzo, while it is rarer in the South of the country.

Closely related but very rare names include Ornelia, and the masculine versions Ornello and Ornelio.

== People ==
=== Given name ===
- Ornella Bankole (born 1997), French basketball player
- Ornella Barra (born 1953), Italian-born Monegasque businesswoman
- Ornella Bertorotta (born 1967), Italian politician
- Ornella Domini (born 1988), Swiss boxer
- Ornella Ferrara (born 1968), Italian long-distance runner
- Ornella Ferrari (1909–1983), Italian song lyricist
- Ornella Havyarimana (born 1994), Burundian boxer
- Ornella Livingston (born 1991), Jamaican sprinter
- Ornella Micheli (fl. 1950–1981), Italian film editor
- Ornella Muti (born 1955 as Francesca Romana Rivelli), Italian actress
- Ornella Oettl Reyes (born 1991), Peruvian-German Alpine skier
- Ornella Ongaro (born 1990), French motorcycle racer
- Elena Ornella Paciotti (born 1941), Italian politician and magistrate
- Ornella Palla (born 1990), Uruguayan handball player
- Ornella Santana (born 1990), Argentine basketball player
- Ornella Sathoud (born 1987), Ghanaian boxer
- Ornella Vanoni (1934–2025), Italian singer
- Ornella Vignola (born 2004), Spanish footballer
- Ornella Volta (1927–2020), Italian-born French musicologist and translator
- Ornella Wahner (born 1993), German boxer

=== Family name ===
- José Ornella Ferreira, Venezuelan military officer

== See also ==
- Ornellas or d'Ornellas, a surname
