= Suriname at the 1991 Pan American Games =

- IOC code: SUR
- NOC: Surinaams Olympisch Comité

in Havana 8–18 August 1991
- Medals Ranked 12th: Gold 1 Silver 2 Bronze 1 Total 4

Pan American Games appearances (overview)
- 1971; 1975; 1979; 1983; 1987; 1991; 1995; 1999; 2003; 2007; 2011; 2015; 2019; 2023

The 11th Pan American Games were held in Havana, Cuba from August 2 to August 18, 1991.

== Medals ==
=== Gold ===
===== Swimming =====
- Men's 100 m butterfly: Anthony Nesty

=== Silver ===
===== Athletics =====
- Women's 1500 metres: Letitia Vriesde

===== Swimming =====
- Men's 200 m butterfly: Anthony Nesty

=== Bronze ===
===== Athletics =====
- Men's 800 metres: Tommy Asinga

== See also ==
- Suriname at the 1992 Summer Olympics
