= Suriname at the 2015 Pan American Games =

- IOC code: SUR
- NOC: Surinaams Olympisch Comité

in Toronto, Canada 10–26 July 2015
- Competitors: 9 in 5 sports
- Flag bearer (opening): Chinyere Pigot
- Flag bearer (closing): Konstantinos Panagiotidis (volunteer)
- Medals: Gold 0 Silver 0 Bronze 0 Total 0

Pan American Games appearances (overview)
- 1971; 1975; 1979; 1983; 1987; 1991; 1995; 1999; 2003; 2007; 2011; 2015; 2019; 2023; 2027

Suriname competed in the 2015 Pan American Games in Toronto, Canada from July 10 to 26, 2015.

On July 4, 2015 a team of 9 athletes in 5 sports was announced to represent the country at the games.

Swimmer Chinyere Pigot was the flagbearer for the team during the opening ceremony.

== Competitors ==
The following table lists Suriname's delegation per sport and gender.

Sport	Men	Women	Total
Athletics	1	1	2
Badminton	1	1	2
Cycling	1	0	1
Swimming	1	2	3
Taekwondo	1	0	1
Total	5	4	9

== Athletics ==
Suriname qualified two athletes.

Key

- Note – Ranks given for track events are for the entire round
- PB = Personal best

Men

Athlete	Event	Final	
Athlete	Event	Distance	Rank
Miguel Van Assen	Men's Triple Jump	16.25	7

Women

Athlete	Event	Heat		Semi Final		Final	
Athlete	Event	Time	Rank	Time	Rank	Time	Rank
Sunayna Wahi	200m	23.92 PB	21	did not advance			

== Badminton ==
Suriname qualified a team of two athletes (one man and one woman).

Athlete	Event	First round	Round of 32	Round of 16	Quarterfinals	Semifinals	Final	Rank
Athlete	Event	Opposition Result	Opposition Result	Opposition Result	Opposition Result	Opposition Result	Opposition Result	Rank
Dylan Darmohoetomo	Men's singles	Seguin (USA); L (9–21, 7–21)	did not advance					
Priscila Tjitrodipo	Women's singles	Silva (BRA); L (5–21, 4–21)	did not advance					
Dylan Darmohoetomo; Priscila Tjitrodipo	Mixed doubles	—N/a	Cabrera / Polanco (DOM); L (16–21, 12–21)	did not advance				

== Cycling ==
Track cycling

Suriname qualified one athlete.

Keirin

Athlete	Event	1st round	Final
Athlete	Event	Rank	Rank
Jair Tjon En Fa	Men's keirin	3 Q	6

Sprint

Athlete	Event	Qualification		Round 1	Repechage 1	Quarterfinals	Semifinals	Final	
Athlete	Event	Time Speed (km/h)	Rank	Opposition Time Speed (km/h)	Opposition Time Speed (km/h)	Opposition Time Speed (km/h)	Opposition Time Speed (km/h)	Opposition Time Speed (km/h)	Rank
Jair Tjon En Fa	Men's sprint	10.193	7 Q	Baranoski (USA); L	Espinoza (USA); Barrette (CAN); L	did not advance			

== Swimming ==
Suriname qualified three swimmers (one male and two females).

Key

- Note – Ranks given are for the entire round
- FA = Qualified for the A Finals
- FB = Qualified for the B Finals

Athlete	Event	Heat		Final	
Athlete	Event	Time	Rank	Time	Rank
Renzo Tjon A Joe	Men's 50 m freestyle	22.31	4 FA	22.30	7
Renzo Tjon A Joe	Men's 100 m freestyle	49.47	7 FA	49.60	8
Evita Leter	Women's 100 m breaststroke	1:15.84	15 FB	1:15.38	16
Chinyere Pigot	Women's 50 m freestyle	25.76	10 FB	25.79	10
Chinyere Pigot	Women's 100 m freestyle	57.29	15 FB	57.25	13

== Taekwondo ==
Suriname qualified one male athlete.

Men

Athlete	Event	Round of 16	Quarterfinals	Semifinals	Repechage	Bronze Medal	Final	
Athlete	Event	Opposition Result	Opposition Result	Opposition Result	Opposition Result	Opposition Result	Opposition Result	Rank
Tosh van Dijk	-68kg	Zelaya (GUA); W 10–9	Colon (PUR); L 7–8	did not advance				

== See also ==
- Suriname at the 2016 Summer Olympics
