= Athletics at the 2015 Pan American Games – Women's 200 metres =

Women's 200 metres at the 2015 Pan American Games
- Venue: CIBC Pan Am and Parapan Am Athletics Stadium
- Dates: July 23 – July 24
- Competitors: 23 from 15 nations
- Winning time: 22.65

Medalists
Gold medal	Kaylin Whitney	United States
Silver medal	Kyra Jefferson	United States
Bronze medal	Simone Facey	Jamaica

The women's 200 metres sprint competition of the athletics events at the 2015 Pan American Games took place between the 23 and 24 of July at the CIBC Pan Am and Parapan Am Athletics Stadium in Toronto, Canada. The defending Pan American Games champion is Ana Cláudia Silva from Brazil.

== Records ==
Prior to this competition, the existing world and Pan American Games records were as follows:

World record	Florence Griffith-Joyner (USA)	21.34	Seoul, South Korea	September 29, 1988
Pan American Games record	Evelyn Ashford (USA)	22.45	San Juan, Puerto Rico	July 9, 1979

== Qualification ==
Each National Olympic Committee (NOC) was able to enter up to two entrants providing they had met the minimum standard (23.64) in the qualifying period (January 1, 2014 to June 28, 2015).

== Schedule ==
Date	Time	Round
July 23, 2015	10:25	Heats
July 23, 2015	18:00	Semifinals
July 24, 2015	17:40	Final

== Results ==
All times shown are in seconds.

KEY:	q	Fastest non-qualifiers	Q	Qualified	NR	National record	PB	Personal best	SB	Seasonal best	DQ	Disqualified

=== Heats ===
Rank	Heat	Name	Nationality	Time	Wind	Notes
1	2	Kamaria Durant	Trinidad and Tobago	22.74	+1.2	Q, PB
2	2	Ángela Tenorio	Ecuador	22.86	+1.2	Q
3	2	Kaylin Whitney	United States	22.88	+1.2	Q
4	3	Simone Facey	Jamaica	22.95	+1.9	Q
4	2	Isidora Jiménez	Chile	22.95	+1.2	Q, PB
6	1	Kerron Stewart	Jamaica	22.97	+1.7	Q
7	2	Nercely Soto	Venezuela	22.99	+1.2	q, SB
8	1	Kyra Jefferson	United States	23.00	+1.7	Q
9	2	Sheniqua Ferguson	Bahamas	23.03	+1.2	q, SB
10	3	Anthonique Strachan	Bahamas	23.10	+1.9	Q
11	1	Reyare Thomas	Trinidad and Tobago	23.30	+1.7	Q
11	3	Kimberly Hyacinthe	Canada	23.30	+1.9	Q
13	3	Arialis Gandulla	Cuba	23.31	+1.9	Q, SB
14	1	Vitoria Cristina Rosa	Brazil	23.36	+1.7	Q
15	2	Kanika Beckles	Grenada	23.38	+1.2	q, PB
16	1	Raquel Tjernagel	Canada	23.63	+1.7	q
17	1	Nediam Vargas	Venezuela	23.65	+1.7	
18	3	Sharolyn Josephs	Costa Rica	23.70	+1.9	NR
19	1	Narcisa Landazuri	Ecuador	23.74	+1.7	
20	3	Allison Peter	Virgin Islands	23.89	+1.9	SB
21	3	Sunayna Wahi	Suriname	23.92	+1.9	PB
22	3	Karene King	British Virgin Islands	24.16	+1.9	
23	2	Ana Cláudia Lemos	Brazil	37.60	+1.2	

=== Semifinals ===
Rank	Heat	Name	Nationality	Time	Wind	Notes
1	2	Ángela Tenorio	Ecuador	22.59	+2.6	Q
2	2	Simone Facey	Jamaica	22.64	+2.6	Q
3	2	Kyra Jefferson	United States	22.65	+2.6	Q
4	1	Kaylin Whitney	United States	22.68	+1.6	Q
5	1	Kerron Stewart	Jamaica	22.72	+1.6	Q, SB
6	1	Anthonique Strachan	Bahamas	22.79	+1.6	Q
7	2	Kimberly Hyacinthe	Canada	22.81	+2.6	q
8	2	Reyare Thomas	Trinidad and Tobago	22.88	+2.6	q
9	1	Kamaria Durant	Trinidad and Tobago	22.94	+1.6	
10	1	Isidora Jiménez	Chile	22.96	+1.6	
11	2	Sheniqua Ferguson	Bahamas	23.03	+2.6	
12	2	Nercely Soto	Venezuela	23.06	+2.6	
13	1	Arialis Gandulla	Cuba	23.08	+1.6	PB
14	2	Vitoria Cristina Rosa	Brazil	23.14	+2.6	
15	1	Raquel Tjernagel	Canada	24.07	+1.6	
16	1	Kanika Beckles	Grenada	28.14	+1.6	

=== Final ===
Wind: +1.1 m/s

Rank	Lane	Name	Nationality	Time	Notes
1st place, gold medalist(s)	5	Kaylin Whitney	United States	22.65	
2nd place, silver medalist(s)	7	Kyra Jefferson	United States	22.72	
3rd place, bronze medalist(s)	4	Simone Facey	Jamaica	22.74	
4	3	Ángela Tenorio	Ecuador	22.88	
5	6	Kerron Stewart	Jamaica	23.07	
6	1	Kimberly Hyacinthe	Canada	23.28	
7	2	Reyare Thomas	Trinidad and Tobago	23.32	
	8	Anthonique Strachan	Bahamas	DNF	
