= Swimming at the 2011 Pan American Games – Women's 200 metre individual medley =

WOMen's 200 metre individual medley at the 2011 Pan American Games
- Venue: Scotiabank Aquatics Center
- Dates: October 18 (preliminaries and finals)
- Competitors: 23 from 16 nations

Medalists
Gold medal	Julia Smit	United States
Silver medal	Alia Atkinson	Jamaica
Bronze medal	Joanna Maranhão	Brazil

The women's 200 metre individual medley competition of the swimming events at the 2011 Pan American Games took place on October 18 at the Scotiabank Aquatics Center in the municipality of Zapopan, near Guadalajara, Mexico. The defending Pan American Games champion was Julia Smit of the United States,

This race consisted of four lengths of the pool, one each in backstroke, breaststroke, butterfly and freestyle swimming.

== Records ==
Prior to this competition, the existing world and Pan American Games records were as follows:

World record	Ariana Kukors (USA)	2:06.15	Rome, Italy	July 27, 2009
Pan American Games record	Julia Smit (USA)	2:13.07	Rio de Janeiro, Brazil	July 20, 2007

== Qualification ==
Each National Olympic Committee (NOC) was able to enter up to two entrants providing they had met the A standard (2:25.7) in the qualifying period (January 1, 2010 to September 4, 2011). NOCs were also permitted to enter one athlete providing they had met the B standard (2:30.1) in the same qualifying period.

== Results ==
All times are in minutes and seconds.

KEY:	q	Fastest non-qualifiers	Q	Qualified	GR	Games record	NR	National record	PB	Personal best	SB	Seasonal best

=== Heats ===
The first round was held on October 18.

Rank	Heat	Lane	Name	Nationality	Time	Notes
1	3	4	Julia Smit	United States	2:15.52	QA
2	3	5	Alia Atkinson	Jamaica	2:18.04	QA
3	2	5	Joanna Maranhão	Brazil	2:19.71	QA
4	1	5	Hanna Pierse	Canada	2:19.86	QA
5	3	3	Georgina Bardach	Argentina	2:20.57	QA
6	2	4	Whitney Myers	United States	2:20.62	QA
7	1	3	Daniela Victoria	Venezuela	2:22.04	QA
8	3	6	Arantxa Medina	Mexico	2:23.08	QA
9	1	4	Paige Schultz	Canada	2:23.31	QB
10	3	2	Julia Arino	Argentina	2:23.74	QB
11	1	6	Larissa Cieslak	Brazil	2:25.57	QB
12	3	7	Eliana Barrios	Venezuela	2:25.97	QB
13	2	3	Mckayla Lightbourn	Bahamas	2:26.66	QB
14	1	7	Ana Castellanos	Honduras	2:28.03	QB
15	2	6	Barbara Caraballo	Puerto Rico	2:28.36	QB
16	1	2	Zara Bailey	Jamaica	2:28.38	QB
17	3	1	Maria Alejandra Torres	Peru	2:30.53	
18	2	7	Lisa Blackburn	Bermuda	2:31.87	
19	3	8	Daniella van der Berg	Aruba	2:32.43	
20	1	1	Daniela Reyes	Chile	2:33.37	
21	2	1	Lara Butler	Cayman Islands	2:34.86	
	2	2	Alana Dillette	Bahamas		DNS
	2	8	Laura Rodriguez	Dominican Republic		DNS

=== B Final ===
The B final was also held on October 18.

Rank	Lane	Name	Nationality	Time	Notes
9	2	Mckayla Lightbourn	Bahamas	2:20.62	
10	4	Paige Schultz	Canada	2:21.38	
11	5	Julia Arino	Argentina	2:24.01	
12	6	Eliana Barrios	Venezuela	2:25.01	
13	3	Larissa Cieslak	Brazil	2:26.23	
14	8	Zara Bailey	Jamaica	2:26.84	
15	7	Ana Castellanos	Honduras	2:27.31	
16	1	Barbara Caraballo	Puerto Rico	2:27.57	

=== A Final ===
The A final was also held on October 18.

Rank	Lane	Name	Nationality	Time	Notes
1st place, gold medalist(s)	4	Julia Smit	United States	2:13.73	
2nd place, silver medalist(s)	5	Alia Atkinson	Jamaica	2:14.75	
3rd place, bronze medalist(s)	3	Joanna Maranhão	Brazil	2:15.08	
4	7	Whitney Myers	United States	2:15.23	
5	6	Hanna Pierse	Canada	2:19.12	
6	8	Arantxa Medina	Mexico	2:21.74	
7	2	Georgina Bardach	Argentina	2:22.65	
8	1	Daniela Victoria	Venezuela	2:22.67	
