= Cycling at the 2023 Pan American Games – Women's keirin =

Women's keirin at the 2023 Pan American Games
- Venue: Velodrome
- Dates: October 25
- Competitors: 12 from 11 nations

Medalists
Gold medal	Martha Bayona	Colombia
Silver medal	Daniela Gaxiola	Mexico
Bronze medal	Dahlia Palmer	Jamaica

The women's keirin competition of the cycling events at the 2023 Pan American Games was held on October 25 at the Velodrome in Santiago, Chile.

== Schedule ==
Date	Time	Round
October 25, 2023	10:24	First round
October 25, 2023	19:17	Finals

== Results ==
=== First round ===
First 3 riders in each heat qualify to Final 1-6 and the others to Final 7-12.

==== Heat 1 ====
Rank	Name	Nation	Notes
1	Martha Bayona	Colombia	Q
2	Daniela Colilef	Chile	Q
3	Dahlia Palmer	Jamaica	Q
4	Marianis Salazar	Colombia	
5	Tachana Dalger	Suriname	
	Jacklynn Boyle	Canada	DNF

==== Heat 2 ====
Rank	Name	Nation	Notes
1	Daniela Gaxiola	Mexico	Q
2	Natalia Vera	Argentina	Q
3	Mandy Marquardt	United States	Q
4	Abigail Recio	Costa Rica	
5	Carolina Barbosa	Brazil	
6	Jalymar Rodríguez	Venezuela	

=== Finals ===
The final classification is determined in the medal finals.

==== Finals 7–12 ====
Rank	Name	Nation	Notes
7	Marianis Salazar	Colombia	
8	Abigail Recio	Costa Rica	
9	Tachana Dalger	Suriname	
10	Jalymar Rodríguez	Venezuela	
11	Carolina Barbosa	Brazil	

==== Finals 1–6 ====
Rank	Name	Nation	Notes
1st place, gold medalist(s)	Martha Bayona	Colombia	
2nd place, silver medalist(s)	Daniela Gaxiola	Mexico	
3rd place, bronze medalist(s)	Dahlia Palmer	Jamaica	
4	Daniela Colilef	Chile	
5	Mandy Marquardt	United States	
	Natalia Vera	Argentina	
