= Ornellas =

Ornellas, d'Ornellas or D'Ornellas are surnames of Portuguese origin. Notable people with these surnames include:

== Ornellas ==
- José Ornellas (1921–2025), Brazilian politician
- Marcus Ornellas (born 1982), Brazilian actor

== d'Ornellas ==
- Charlotte d'Ornellas (born 1986), French journalist and columnist
- Colin d'Ornellas (1889–1934), a cricketer from British Guiana
- Pierre d'Ornellas (born 1953), French Roman Catholic archbishop

== D'Ornellas ==
- Manuel D'Ornellas (1937–1999), Peruvian lawyer and journalist

== See also ==
- Ornella, an Italian feminine given name
