= Suriname at the Pan American Games =

- IOC code: SUR
- NOC: Surinaams Olympisch Comité
- Medals Ranked 22nd: Gold 3 Silver 3 Bronze 5 Total 11

Pan American Games appearances (overview)
- 1971; 1975; 1979; 1983; 1987; 1991; 1995; 1999; 2003; 2007; 2011; 2015; 2019; 2023

Suriname at the Pan American Games.

== Medal count ==
To sort the tables by host city, total medal count, or any other column, click on the icon next to the column title.

=== Summer ===
Year	Edition	Host city	Gold	Silver	Bronze	Total
1951	I	(Argentina) Buenos Aires	did not participate			
1955	II	Mexico City	did not participate			
1959	III	(United States) Chicago	did not participate			
1963	IV	(Brazil) São Paulo	did not participate			
1967	V	(Canada) Winnipeg	did not participate			
1971	VI	(Colombia) Cali	0	0	0	0
1975	VII	Mexico City	0	0	0	0
1979	VIII	(Puerto Rico) San Juan	0	0	0	0
1983	IX	(Venezuela) Caracas	0	0	0	0
1987	X	(United States) Indianapolis	1	0	1	2
1991	XI	(Cuba) Havana	1	2	1	4
1995	XII	(Argentina) Mar del Plata	0	0	2	2
1999	XIII	(Canada) Winnipeg	1	0	1	2
2003	XIV	(Dominican Republic) Santo Domingo	0	0	0	0
2007	XV	(Brazil) Rio de Janeiro	0	0	0	0
2011	XVI	(Mexico) Guadalajara	0	0	0	0
2015	XVII	(Canada) Toronto	0	0	0	0
2019	XVIII	(Peru) Lima	0	0	0	0
2023	XIX	(Chile) Santiago	0	1	0	1
Total			3	3	5	11

=== Winter ===
Year	Edition	Host city	Gold	Silver	Bronze	Total
1990	I	(Argentina) Las Leñas	did not participate			
Total			0	0	0	0
