= Suriname at the 2011 Pan American Games =

- IOC code: SUR
- NOC: Surinaams Olympisch Comité

in Guadalajara 14–30 October 2011
- Competitors: 11 in 4 sports
- Flag bearer: Crystal Leefmans
- Medals: Gold 0 Silver 0 Bronze 0 Total 0

Pan American Games appearances (overview)
- 1971; 1975; 1979; 1983; 1987; 1991; 1995; 1999; 2003; 2007; 2011; 2015; 2019; 2023

Suriname competed at the 2011 Pan American Games in Guadalajara, Mexico from October 14 to 30, 2011. Oscar Brandon was the Chef de mission. Suriname competed with eleven athletes in four sports.

== Athletics ==
Suriname sent two athletes.

=== Men ===
Track and road events

Event	Athlete	Preliminaries		Semifinals		Final	
Event	Athlete	Result	Rank	Result	Rank	Result	Rank
100 m	Jurgen Themen	11.71	31st	did not advance			

=== Women ===
Track and road events

Event	Athletes	Semifinal		Final	
Event	Athletes	Time	Rank	Time	Rank
100 m	Ramona Van der Vloot	12.01 PB	16th	did not advance	
200 m	Ramona Van der Vloot	24.69	12th	did not advance	

== Badminton ==
Suriname qualified three male and three female athletes in the badminton competition; this represented more than half the entire team.

Men

Athlete	Event	First round	Second round	Third round	Quarterfinals	Semifinals	Final
Athlete	Event	Opposition Result	Opposition Result	Opposition Result	Opposition Result	Opposition Result	Opposition Result
Mitchel Wongsodikromo	Men's singles	Andre Padmore (BAR); W 21–8, 21–10	Toledo Ronald (CUB); L 18-21, 21–14, 13-21	did not advance			
Virgil Soeroredjo	Men's singles		Osleni Guerrero (CUB); L 11–21, 16–21	did not advance			
Dylan Darmohoetomo	Men's singles		Cristian Araya (CHI); L 17–21, 17–21	did not advance			
Virgil Soeroredjo; Mitchel Wongsodikromo	Men's doubles			Hugo Arthuso (BRA); Daniel Paiola (BRA); L 18–21, 21–17, 11–21	did not advance		

Women

Athlete	Event	First round	Second round	Third round	Quarterfinals	Semifinals	Final
Athlete	Event	Opposition Result	Opposition Result	Opposition Result	Opposition Result	Opposition Result	Opposition Result
Crystal Leefmans	Women's singles		Victoria Valdesolo (ARG); W 21–16, 21–6	Iris Wang (USA); L 10–21, 10–21	did not advance		
Priscila Tjitrodipo	Women's singles		Edith Capote (ECU); L 16–21, 8–21	did not advance			
Rugshaar Ishaak	Women's singles		Alejandra Monteverde (PER); L 11–21, 9–21	did not advance			
Crystal Leefmans; Priscila Tjitrodipo	Women's doubles			Cynthia Gonzalez (MEX); Victoria Montero (MEX); L 5–21, 19–21	did not advance		

Mixed

Athlete	Event	First round	Second round	Quarterfinals	Semifinals	Final
Athlete	Event	Opposition Result	Opposition Result	Opposition Result	Opposition Result	Opposition Result
Mitchel Wongsodikromo; Crystal Leefmans	Mixed doubles	Toledo Ronald (CUB); Chaviano Mislenis (CUB); W 23–21, 21–11	Andre Padmore (BAR); Shari Watson (BAR); W 21–23, 21–14, 22–20	Toby Ng (CAN); Grace Gao (CAN); L 9-21, 11–21	did not advance	
Dylan Darmohoetomo; Rugshaar Ishaak	Mixed doubles	Heymard Humblers (GUA); Nicte Sotomayor (GUA); L 20–22, 12–21	did not advance			

== Swimming ==
Suriname sent two swimmers.

Men

Athlete	Event	Heats		Final	
Athlete	Event	Time	Rank	Time	Rank
Diguan Pigot	100 m breaststroke	1:06.54	21st	did not advance	
Diguan Pigot	200 m medley	2:31.40	12th	did not advance	

Women

Athlete	Event	Heats		Final	
Athlete	Event	Time	Rank	Time	Rank
Chinyere Pigot	50 m freestyle	26.89	14th	did not advance	
Chinyere Pigot	100 m freestyle	58.95	14th	did not advance	

== Taekwondo ==
Suriname received a wildcard to send one male taekwondo athlete.

Men

Athlete	Event	Round of 16	Quarterfinals	Semifinals	Final	
Athlete	Event	Opposition Result	Opposition Result	Opposition Result	Opposition Result	Rank
Jurmen Amiena	+80 kg	Christopher Moitland (CRC); L 5 - 8	did not advance			
