= Suriname at the 2003 Pan American Games =

- IOC code: SUR
- NOC: Surinaams Olympisch Comité

in Santo Domingo 1–17 August 2003
- Medals: Gold 0 Silver 0 Bronze 0 Total 0

Pan American Games appearances (overview)
- 1971; 1975; 1979; 1983; 1987; 1991; 1995; 1999; 2003; 2007; 2011; 2015; 2019; 2023; 2027

The 14th Pan American Games were held in Santo Domingo, Dominican Republic from August 1 to August 17, 2003.

== Medals ==
=== Gold ===
Suriname has originally won one gold medal through Letitia Vriesde's performance in the women's 800m. However she was later stripped of the medal due to testing positive for drugs.

== Results by event ==
=== Triathlon ===
Athlete	Event	Race			Total	
Athlete	Event	Swim	Bike	Run	Time	Rank
Anthony van Lierop	Men's Individual	21:02.000	1:01:57.100	41:38.900	02:05:35	26

=== Swimming ===
==== Women's competitions ====
Athlete	Event	Time	Rank
Sade Daal	100 metre freestyle	1:04.62	25

Men's competitions

Athlete	Event	Time	Rank
Gordon Touw Ngie Tjouw	100 metres butterfly	57.99	18

== See also ==
- Suriname at the 2002 Central American and Caribbean Games
- Suriname at the 2004 Summer Olympics
