= Suriname at the 2019 Pan American Games =

- IOC code: SUR
- NOC: Surinaams Olympisch Comité

in Lima, Peru 26 July–11 August, 2019
- Competitors: 6 in 4 sports
- Flag bearer: Dylan Darmohoetomo (opening)
- Medals: Gold 0 Silver 0 Bronze 0 Total 0

Pan American Games appearances (overview)
- 1971; 1975; 1979; 1983; 1987; 1991; 1995; 1999; 2003; 2007; 2011; 2015; 2019; 2023

Suriname competed at the 2019 Pan American Games in Lima, Peru from July 26 to August 11, 2019.

The Suriname team consisted of six athletes (five men and one woman) competing in four sports. Triple jumper Miguel Van Assen had to withdraw from the team due to injury. During the opening ceremony of the games, badminton player Dylan Darmohoetomo carried the flag of the country as part of the parade of nations.

== Competitors ==
The following is the list of number of competitors (per gender) participating at the games per sport/discipline.

Sport	Men	Women	Total
Badminton	2	0	2
Cycling	1	0	1
Swimming	1	1	2
Taekwondo	1	0	1
Total	5	1	6

== Badminton ==
Suriname qualified a team of two male badminton athletes. Originally Suriname also qualified two women, but declined the quotas.

Men

Athlete	Event	Round of 64	Round of 32	Round of 16	Quarterfinals	Semifinals	Final	Rank
Athlete	Event	Opposition Result	Opposition Result	Opposition Result	Opposition Result	Opposition Result	Opposition Result	Rank
Dylan Darmohoetomo	Singles	León (CHI); L 0–2 (20–22, 11–21)	did not advance					
Sören Opti	Singles	Bye	Baque (ECU); W 2–1 (21–17, 13–21, 21–17)	Guerrero (CUB); L 0–2 (20–22, 9–21)	did not advance			
Dylan Darmohoetomo; Sören Opti	Doubles	—N/a		Solís / Ramírez (GUA); L 0–2 (7–22, 9–21)	did not advance			

== Cycling ==
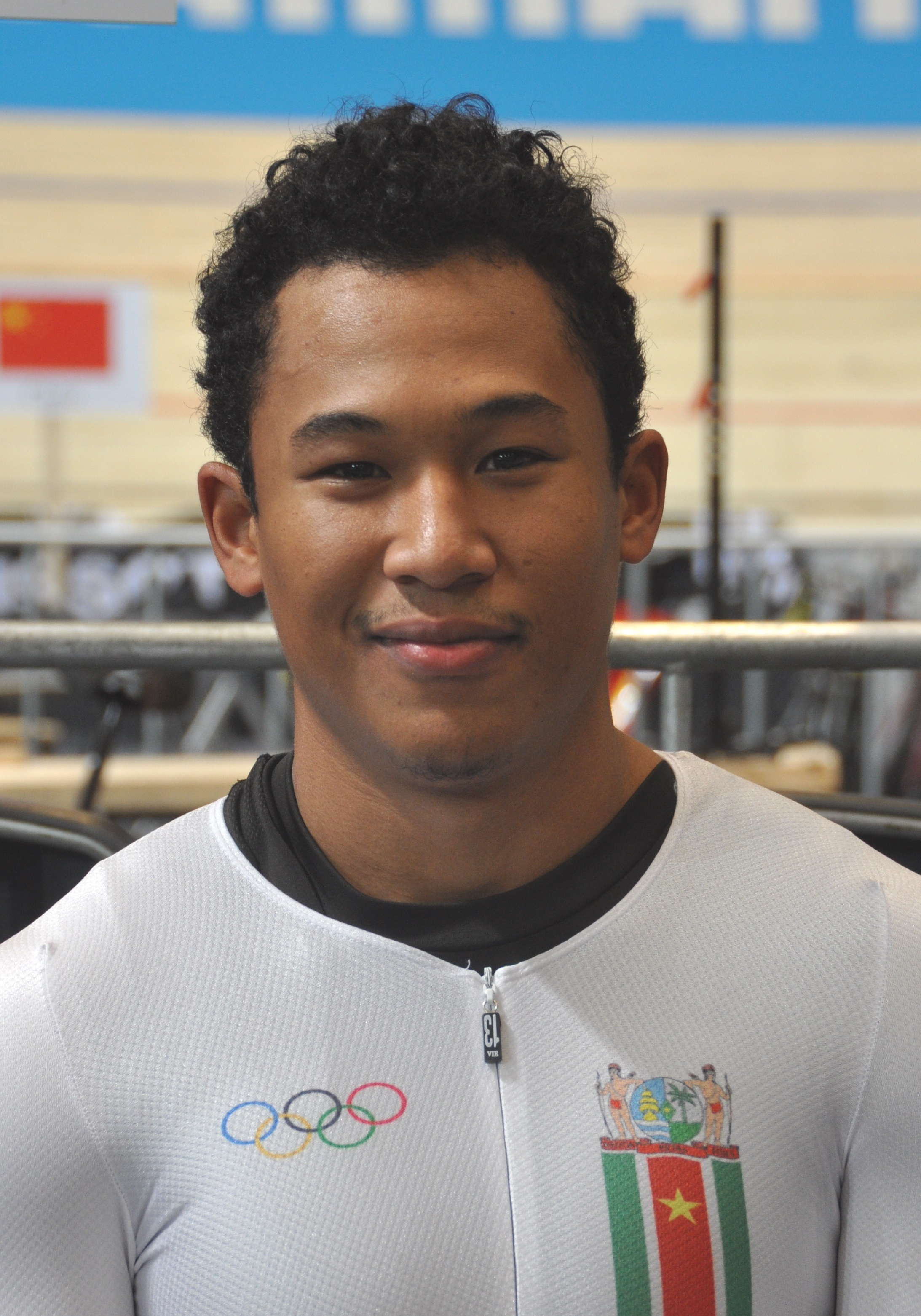
Jair Tjon En Fa competed in two events

Suriname qualified one male track cyclist.

=== Track ===
Men
Keirin

Key

- Note – Ranks given are within the heat
- QA – Qualified for Final A

Athlete	Event	1st round	Repechage	Final
Athlete	Event	Rank	Rank	Rank
Jair Tjon En Fa	Keirin	2 QA	Bye	5

Sprint

Athlete	Event	Qualification		Round 1	Repechage 1	Quarterfinals	Semifinals	Final (5th-8th)	
Athlete	Event	Time Speed (km/h)	Rank	Opposition Time Speed (km/h)	Opposition Time Speed (km/h)	Opposition Time Speed (km/h)	Opposition Time Speed (km/h)	Opposition Time Speed (km/h)	Rank
Jair Tjon En Fa	Sprint	10.166; 70.824	5 Q	Estrada (GUA); W	Bye	Puerta (COL); L 10.519, L 10.453	—N/a	2nd	6

== Swimming ==
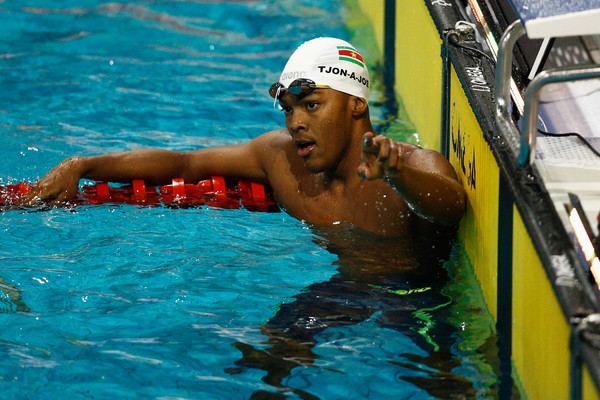
Renzo Tjon-A-Joe competed in two events

Suriname qualified one male swimmer and received a universality spot to enter one female.

Key

- Note – Ranks given are for the entire round
- QA – Qualified for Final A

Athlete	Event	Heat		Final	
Athlete	Event	Time	Rank	Time	Rank
Renzo Tjon-A-Joe	Men's 50 m freestyle	22.24	5 QA	22.58	8
Renzo Tjon-A-Joe	Men's 100 m freestyle	57.61	=8	did not advance	
Evita Leter	Women's 100 m breaststroke	1:18.44	20	did not advance	

- Tjon-A-Joe did not compete in the swim-off in the 100 m freestyle event, thus he did not qualify for the either final.

== Taekwondo ==
Suriname qualified one male taekwondo practitioner.

Kyorugi
Men

Athlete	Event	Round of 16	Quarterfinals	Semifinals	Repechage	Final / BM	Rank
Athlete	Event	Opposition Result	Opposition Result	Opposition Result	Opposition Result	Opposition Result	Rank
Tosh Van Dijk	-68 kg	Morales (CHI); L DSQ	did not advance				

== See also ==
- Suriname at the 2020 Summer Olympics
