= Jamaica at the 2003 Pan American Games =

- IOC code: JAM
- NOC: Jamaica Olympic Association

in Santo Domingo 1–17 August 2003
- Flag bearer: Deavial Cleark
- Medals Ranked 10th: Gold 5 Silver 2 Bronze 6 Total 13

Pan American Games appearances (overview)
- 1951; 1955; 1959; 1963; 1967; 1971; 1975; 1979; 1983; 1987; 1991; 1995; 1999; 2003; 2007; 2011; 2015; 2019; 2023

The 14th Pan American Games were held in Santo Domingo, Dominican Republic from August 1 to August 17, 2003. Jamaica came in tenth place in the final medals table, a drop in placing from the ninth spot in Winnipeg (1999) but showing a significant increase in the number of gold medals won.

== Medals ==
=== Gold ===
===== Athletics =====
- Men's 100 metres: Michael Frater
- Men's 4x400m Relay: Michael Campbell, Sanjay Ayre, Lansford Spence, and Davian Clarke
- Men's High Jump: Germaine Mason
- Women's 100m Hurdles: Brigitte Foster

===== Badminton =====
- Women's Singles: Nigella Saunders

=== Silver ===
===== Athletics =====
- Men's 200 metres: Christopher Williams
- Women's 4x400m Relay: Naleya Downer, Michelle Burgher, Novlene Williams, and Allison Beckford

=== Bronze ===
===== Athletics =====
- Men's 400m Hurdles: Dean Griffiths
- Women's 4x100m Relay: Lacena Golding-Clarke, Judyth Kitson, Shellene Williams, and Danielle Browning
- Women's 1,500 metres: Mardrea Hyman
- Women's 100m Hurdles: Lacena Golding-Clarke

===== Badminton =====
- Men's Doubles: Bradley Graham and Charles Pyne
- Mixed Doubles: Nigella Saunders and Charles Pyne

== Results by event ==
=== Athletics ===
Track

Athlete	Event	Heat		Final	
Athlete	Event	Time	Rank	Time	Rank
Michael Frater	Men's 100 m	10.39	3	10.21	1st place, gold medalist(s)
Sheldon Morant	Men's 100 m	10.61	8	10.36	6
Mardrea Hyman	Women's 1,500 m	—	—	4:10.08	3rd place, bronze medalist(s)
Dean Griffiths	Men's 400 m hurdles	49.08	3	49.35	3rd place, bronze medalist(s)
Allison Beckford	Women's 400 m hurdles	56.85	8	55.50	6
Debbie-Ann Parris-Thymes	Women's 400 m hurdles	55.97	6	56.73	7

Field

Athlete	Event	Throws						Total	
Athlete	Event	1	2	3	4	5	6	Distance	Rank
Natalie Grant	Women's Hammer	57.44	57.28	X	X	59.13	59.99	59.99 m	6
Kimberly Barrett	Women's Hammer	—	—	—				DNS	—
Dorian Scott	Men's Shot Put	X	16.67	17.02	—	—	—	17.02 m	10

=== Swimming ===
==== Men's Competition ====
Athlete	Event	Heat		Final	
Athlete	Event	Time	Rank	Time	Rank
Timothy Wong	100 m butterfly	59.60	24	did not advance	
Timothy Wong	200 m butterfly	2:12.16	22	did not advance	

==== Women's Competition ====
Athlete	Event	Heat		Final	
Athlete	Event	Time	Rank	Time	Rank
Janelle Atkinson	200 m freestyle	2:03.73	3	2:03.27	7
Angela Chuck	200 m freestyle	2:06.52	10	2:06.76	11
Janelle Atkinson	400 m freestyle	4:19.39	4	4:15.99	5

== See also ==
- Jamaica at the 2004 Summer Olympics
