= Jamaica at the 1999 Pan American Games =

- IOC code: JAM
- NOC: Jamaica Olympic Association

in Winnipeg 23 July – 8 August 1999
- Medals Ranked 9th: Gold 3 Silver 4 Bronze 6 Total 13

Pan American Games appearances (overview)
- 1951; 1955; 1959; 1963; 1967; 1971; 1975; 1979; 1983; 1987; 1991; 1995; 1999; 2003; 2007; 2011; 2015; 2019; 2023

Jamaica competed at the 13th Pan American Games, which were held in Winnipeg, Manitoba, Canada from July 23 to August 8, 1999.

== Medals ==
=== Gold ===
===== Athletics =====
- Men's 400 metres: Greg Haughton
- Men's 4x400 metres: Davian Clarke, Michael McDonald, Danny McFarlane and Greg Haughton
- Women's 4x100 metres: Peta-Gaye Gayle, Beverly Grant, Kerry Ann Richards, and Aleen Bailey

=== Silver ===
===== Athletics =====
- Women's Triple Jump: Suzette Lee

===== Swimming =====
- Women's 200m freestyle: Janelle Atkinson
- Women's 400m freestyle: Janelle Atkinson
- Women's 800m freestyle: Janelle Atkinson

=== Bronze ===
===== Athletics =====
- Men's 4x100 metres: Patrick Jarrett, Dwight Thomas, Garth Robinson, and Christopher Williams
- Women's 100 metres: Peta-Gaye Gayle
- Women's 400 metres: Claudine Williams

===== Boxing =====
- Men's Light Middleweight (– 71 kilograms): David Sean Black
- Men's Heavyweight (– 91 kilograms): Kerron Speid

== See also ==
- Jamaica at the 1998 Commonwealth Games
- Jamaica at the 2000 Summer Olympics
