= Jamaica at the 2007 Pan American Games =

- IOC code: JAM
- NOC: Jamaica Olympic Association

in Rio de Janeiro 13–29 July 2007
- Competitors: 147
- Flag bearer: Alia Atkinson
- Medals Ranked 13th: Gold 3 Silver 5 Bronze 1 Total 9

Pan American Games appearances (overview)
- 1951; 1955; 1959; 1963; 1967; 1971; 1975; 1979; 1983; 1987; 1991; 1995; 1999; 2003; 2007; 2011; 2015; 2019; 2023

The 15th Pan American Games were held in Rio de Janeiro, Brazil from 13 July to 29 July 2007. Jamaica came in 13th place in the final medals table, a drop in placing from the tenth spot in Santo Domingo (2003).

== Medals ==
=== Gold ===
===== Athletics =====
- Men's Decathlon: Maurice Smith
- Women's 4×100 metres relay: Sheri-Ann Brooks, Tracy-Ann Rowe, Aleen Bailey and Peta-Gaye Gayle
- Women's 100 metres hurdles: Delloreen Ennis-London

=== Silver ===
===== Athletics =====
- Men's 200 metres: Marvin Anderson
- Men's Shot Put: Dorian Scott
- Women's 200 metres: Sheri-Ann Brooks
- Women's 400 metres hurdles: Nickiesha Wilson

===== Football =====
- Men's Team Competition: Jamaica national football team

=== Bronze ===
===== Boxing =====
- Men's Welterweight: Ricardo Smith

== Results by event ==
=== Basketball ===
==== Women's team competition ====
- Preliminary Round

- Lost to Brazil (69-81)
- Lost to Canada (46-58)
- Defeated Mexico (69-46)

- Classification Round

- 5th/8th place: Lost to Argentina (61-73)
- 7th/8th place: Lost to Mexico (56-63) → 8th place

- Team Roster

- Rashida Aikens
- Kimberly Bennett
- Latoya Byfield
- Simone Edwards
- Vanessa Gidden
- Simone Jackson
- Nicole Louden
- Antoinette Messam
- Oberon Pitterson
- Rebecca Richman
- Sharon Wiles
- Demoya Williams

=== Football ===
==== Men's team competition ====
- Preliminary Round

- Defeated Colombia (1-0)
- Defeated Argentina (2-0)
- Defeated Haiti (4-0)

- Semi Finals

- Defeated Mexico (0-0, 5-4 on penalties)

- Final

- Lost to Ecuador (1-2) → Silver Medal

- Team Roster

- Dwayne Miller
- Andrae Campbell
- Ajuran Brown
- Jermaine Jarrett
- Ricardo Cousins
- Eric Vernan
- Keammar Daley
- James Thomas
- Edward Campbell
- O'Brian Woodbine
- Duwayne Kerr
- Alanzo Adlam
- Dawyne Smith
- John-Ross Doyley
- Norman Bailey
- Damaine Thompson
- Troy Smith
- Draion McNain

==== Women's team competition ====
- Preliminary Round

- Defeated Ecuador (1-0)
- Lost to Brazil (0-5)
- Drew with Uruguay (1-1)
- Lost to Canada (1-11) → did not advance

== See also ==
- Jamaica at the 2006 Commonwealth Games
- Jamaica at the 2008 Summer Olympics
