= Jamaica at the 1991 Pan American Games =

- IOC code: JAM
- NOC: Jamaica Olympic Association

in Havana 8–18 August 1991
- Medals Ranked 11th: Gold 2 Silver 1 Bronze 5 Total 8

Pan American Games appearances (overview)
- 1951; 1955; 1959; 1963; 1967; 1971; 1975; 1979; 1983; 1987; 1991; 1995; 1999; 2003; 2007; 2011; 2015; 2019; 2023

The 11th Pan American Games were held in Havana, Cuba from August 2 to August 18, 1991.

== Medals ==
=== Gold ===
===== Athletics =====
- Women's Long Jump: Diane Guthrie-Gresham
- Women's 4 × 100 m Relay: Dahlia Duhaney, Merlene Frazer, Cheryl-Ann Phillips, and Beverly McDonald

=== Silver ===
===== Athletics =====
- Women's 400 metres hurdles: Deon Hemmings

=== Bronze ===
===== Athletics =====
- Women's 100 metres: Beverly McDonald
- Women's 200 metres: Merlene Frazer
- Men's 4 × 400 m Relay: Michael Anderson, Howard Burnett, Seymour Fagan, and Patrick O'Connor
- Women's 4 × 400 m Relay: Vivienne Spence, Cathy Rattray-Williams, Sandie Richards, and Inez Turner

===== Boxing =====
- Men's Lightweight (– 60 kilograms): Delroy Leslie

== See also ==
- Jamaica at the 1990 Commonwealth Games
- Jamaica at the 1992 Summer Olympics
