= Suriname at the 2023 Pan American Games =

- IOC code: SUR
- NOC: Suriname Olympic Committee

in Santiago, Chile 20 October 2023 – 5 November 2023
- Competitors: 6 in 4 sports
- Flag bearers (opening): Irvin Hoost & Kaelyn Djoparto
- Flag bearer (closing): TBD
- Medals Ranked =28th: Gold 0 Silver 1 Bronze 0 Total 1

Pan American Games appearances (overview)
- 1971; 1975; 1979; 1983; 1987; 1991; 1995; 1999; 2003; 2007; 2011; 2015; 2019; 2023

Suriname competed at the 2023 Pan American Games in Santiago, Chile from October 20 to November 5, 2023. This was Suriname's 14th appearance at the Pan American Games, having competed at every Games since 1971.

The Surinamese team consisted of six athletes competing in four sports. Swimmers Irvin Hoost and Kaeylin Djoparto were the country's flagbearers during the opening ceremony. Cyclist Jaïr Tjon En Fa won Suriname's first medal since the 1999 Pan American Games in Winnipeg, Canada, representing a span of 24 years.

== Medalists ==
The following Surinamese competitors won medals at the games. In the by discipline sections below, medalists' names are bolded.

Medal	Name	Sport	Event	Date
Silver	Jaïr Tjon En Fa	Cycling	Men's sprint	October 24

== Competitors ==
The following is the list of number of competitors (per gender) participating at the games per sport/discipline.

Sport	Men	Women	Total
Badminton	1	0	1
Cycling	1	1	2
Swimming	1	1	2
Taekwondo	1	0	1
Total	4	2	6

== Badminton ==
Suriname qualified one male athlete. Soren Opti, Suriname's only representative in the sport, won his first match before losing to number one seed Brian Yang of Canada.

Men

Athlete	Event	First round	Second round	Quarterfinals	Semifinals	Final	Rank
Athlete	Event	Opposition Result	Opposition Result	Opposition Result	Opposition Result	Opposition Result	Rank
Sören Opti	Singles	Evans (JAM); **W** 2–0 (21–16, 21–18)	Yang (CAN); **L** 0–2 (8–21, 9–21)	Did not advance			

== Cycling ==
Suriname qualified a total of 3 cyclists (two men and one woman). However, only one male and female cyclist was entered.

=== Track ===
Sprint

Athlete	Event	Qualification		Round of 16	Repechage 1	Quarterfinals	Semifinals	Final	
Athlete	Event	Time	Rank	Opposition Time	Opposition Time	Opposition Result	Opposition Result	Opposition Result	Rank
**Jaïr Tjon En Fa**	Men's individual	9.703	3 **Q**	Silva (BRA); **W** 10.362	Bye	Rorke (CAN); **W** 10.143 / 10.246	Wammes (CAN); **W** 10.161 / 10.103	Paul (TTO); **L**	2nd place, silver medalist(s)
Tachana Dalger	Women's individual	11.565	16	Did not advance					

Keirin

Athlete	Event	Heats	Final
Athlete	Event	Rank	Rank
Jaïr Tjon En Fa	Men's	2 **FA**	5
Tachana Dalger	Women's	5 **FB**	9

== Swimming ==
Suriname qualified two swimmers (one man and one woman).

Athlete	Event	Heat		Final	
Athlete	Event	Time	Rank	Time	Rank
Irvin Hoost	Men's 50 m freestyle	24.18	27	Did not advance	
Irvin Hoost	Men's 100 m freestyle	53.37	30	Did not advance	
Irvin Hoost	Men's 100 m butterfly	58.76	28	Did not advance	
Kaeylin Djoparto	Women's 50 m freestyle	30.21	34	Did not advance	
Kaeylin Djoparto	Women's 100 m freestyle	1:08.74	39	Did not advance	
Kaeylin Djoparto	Women's 100 m butterfly	1:13.47	28	Did not advance	

Qualification legend: Q – Qualify to the medal final; q – Qualify to the non-medal final

== Taekwondo ==
Suriname qualified one male athlete after receiving a wildcard.

Kyorugi

Men

Athlete	Event	Round of 16	Quarterfinals	Semifinals	Repechage	Final/ BM	
Athlete	Event	Opposition Result	Opposition Result	Opposition Result	Opposition Result	Opposition Result	Rank
Samaki Pinas	–68 kg	Morales (CHI); **L** 0–2	Did not advance				

== See also ==
- Suriname at the 2024 Summer Olympics
