= Jamaica at the 2015 Pan American Games =

- IOC code: JAM
- NOC: Jamaica Olympic Association

in Toronto, Canada 10–26 July 2015
- Competitors: 56 in 7 sports
- Flag bearer (opening): Gareth Henry
- Flag bearer (closing): RasheedDwyer
- Medals Ranked 13th: Gold 3 Silver 4 Bronze 2 Total 9

Pan American Games appearances (overview)
- 1951; 1955; 1959; 1963; 1967; 1971; 1975; 1979; 1983; 1987; 1991; 1995; 1999; 2003; 2007; 2011; 2015; 2019; 2023

Jamaica competed in the 2015 Pan American Games in Toronto, Ontario, Canada from July 10 to 26, 2015.

The Jamaican team consisting of 56 athletes in 7 sports was announced on July 3, 2015 by the Jamaica Olympic Association.

Badminton player Gareth Henry was the flagbearer for the team during the opening ceremony.

== Competitors ==
The following table lists Jamaica's delegation per sport and gender.

Sport	Men	Women	Total
Athletics	21	20	41
Badminton	2	2	4
Cycling	1	0	1
Diving	1	0	1
Golf	1	0	1
Shooting	1	0	1
Swimming	1	4	5
Taekwondo	1	1	2
Total	29	27	56

== Medalists ==
The following competitors from Jamaica won medals at the games. In the by discipline sections below, medalists' names are bolded.

Medal	Name	Sport	Event	Date
Gold	O'Dayne Richards	Athletics	Men's shot put	July 21
Gold	Sherone Simpson	Athletics	Women's 100 m	July 22
Gold	Fedrick Dacres	Athletics	Men's discus throw	July 23
Silver	Alia Atkinson	Swimming	Women's 100 m breaststroke	July 17
Silver	Rasheed Dwyer	Athletics	Men's 200 m	July 24
Silver	Samantha Henry-Robinson; Schillonie Calvert; Simone Facey; Kerron Stewart Stewart; Sherone Simpson	Athletics	Women's 4 × 100 metres relay	July 25
Silver	Anastasia Le-Roy; Verone Chambers; Chrisann Gordon; Bobby-Gaye Wilkins	Athletics	Women's 4 × 400 metres relay	July 25
Bronze	Roxroy Cato	Athletics	Men's 400 m hurdles	July 23
Bronze	Simone Facey	Athletics	Women's 200 m	July 24

**Medals by sport**
**Sport**	1st place, gold medalist(s)	2nd place, silver medalist(s)	3rd place, bronze medalist(s)	**Total**
Athletics	3	3	2	8
Swimming	0	1	0	1
**Total**	**3**	**4**	**2**	**9**

**Medals by day**
**Day**	1st place, gold medalist(s)	2nd place, silver medalist(s)	3rd place, bronze medalist(s)	**Total**
July 10	0	0	0	0
July 11	0	0	0	0
July 12	0	0	0	0
July 13	0	0	0	0
July 14	0	0	0	0
July 15	0	0	0	0
July 16	0	0	0	0
July 17	0	1	0	1
July 18	0	0	0	0
July 19	0	0	0	0
July 20	0	0	0	0
July 21	1	0	0	1
July 22	1	0	0	1
July 23	1	0	1	2
July 24	0	1	1	2
July 25	0	2	0	2
July 26	0	0	0	0
**Total**	**3**	**4**	**2**	**9**

== Athletics ==
Jamaica qualified 50 athletes (25 men and 25 women). However, only 41 (21 men and 20 women) eventually competed as the organizers had to reduce the number of athletes competing because too many had been entered into the competition. Athlete Jonique Day was named to the team in the women's 4 × 400 m relay event, but did not compete in the semifinals or final.

Key

- Note – Ranks given for track events are for the entire round
- Q = Qualified for the next round
- q = Qualified for the next round as a fastest loser or, in field events, by position without achieving the qualifying target
- NR = National record
- PR = Pan American Games Record
- PB = Personal best
- SB = Seasonal best
- NM = No mark
- N/A = Round not applicable for the event

Men
Track

Athlete	Event	Round 1		Semifinal		Final	
Athlete	Event	Result	Rank	Result	Rank	Result	Rank
Jason Livermore	100 m	10.09	6 Q	10.10	=3	10.17	7
Sheldon Mitchell	100 m	10.14	=9 Q	10.35	14	did not advance	
Rasheed Dwyer	200 m	20.25	4 Q	19.80 PR	1 Q	19.90	2nd place, silver medalist(s)
Jason Livermore	200 m	21.02	=22	did not advance			
Ricardo Cunningham	800 m	—N/a		1:49.22	=4 Q	1:48.65	4
Jowayne Hibbert	800 m	—N/a		1:49.22	=4 Q	1:49.24	8
Tyler Mason	110 metres hurdles	—N/a		13.40	=3 Q	13.69	7
Dwight Thomas	110 metres hurdles	—N/a		13.58	10	did not advance	
Roxroy Cato	400 metres hurdles	—N/a		49.85	=2 Q	48.72 SB	3rd place, bronze medalist(s)
Leford Green	400 metres hurdles	—N/a		50.51	5 Q	49.42	6
Bernardo Brady; Dexter Lee; Jason Livermore; Sheldon Mitchell; Oshane Bailey*	4 × 100 metres relay	—N/a		38.75	7 q	DNF	
Jonia McDonald; Dane Hyatt; Javere Bell; Ricardo Chambers; Riker Hylton*	4 × 400 metres relay	—N/a		3:03.72	6 Q	3:01.97	6

- Athletes with stars competed in the heats only.

Field

Athlete	Event	Qualification		Final	
Athlete	Event	Distance	Rank	Distance	Rank
Fedrick Dacres	Discus throw	—N/a		64.80	1st place, gold medalist(s)
Damar Forbes	Long jump	7.67	9 q	DNS	
O'Dayne Richards	Shot put	—N/a		21.69 NR	1st place, gold medalist(s)
Raymond Brown	Shot put	—N/a		18.39	9

Women
Track

Athlete	Event	Round 1		Semifinal		Final	
Athlete	Event	Result	Rank	Result	Rank	Result	Rank
Schillonie Calvert	100 m	11.27	12 Q	11.29	11	did not advance	
Sherone Simpson	100 m	11.18	10 q	11.02	3 Q	10.95 SB	1st place, gold medalist(s)
Simone Facey	200 m	22.95	4 Q	22.64	2 Q	22.74	3rd place, bronze medalist(s)
Kerron Stewart	200 m	22.97	6 Q	22.72	5 Q	23.07	5
Chrisann Gordon	400 m	—N/a		52.47	5 Q	51.75	4
Anastasia Le-Roy	400 m	—N/a		53.13	7 q	52.05	5
Kimarra McDonald	800 m	—N/a		2:05.72	8 q	2:04.37	8
Kimberly Laing	100 metres hurdles	—N/a		12.86	3 Q	12.95	4
Monique Morgan	100 metres hurdles	—N/a		did not start			
Samantha Elliott	400 metres hurdles	—N/a		58.30	9	did not advance	
Ristananna Tracey	400 metres hurdles	—N/a		58.62	11	did not advance	
Samantha Henry-Robinson; Schillonie Calvert; Simone Facey; Kerron Stewart; Sherone Simpson*	4 × 100 metres relay	—N/a		42.82	1 Q	42.68	2nd place, silver medalist(s)
Anastasia Le-Roy; Verone Chambers; Chrisann Gordon; Bobby-Gaye Wilkins	4 × 400 metres relay	—N/a		3:30.29	3 Q	3:27.27	2nd place, silver medalist(s)

- Athletes with stars competed in the heats only. Athletes who competed in the preliminaries were also awarded medals.

Field

Athlete	Event	Final	
Athlete	Event	Distance	Rank
Saniel Atkinson-Grier	High jump	1.80	=9
Kimberly Williamson	High jump	1.88	6
Shanieka Thomas	Triple jump	13.74	9
Danniel Thomas	Shot put	17.76 PB	5
Daina Levy	Hammer throw	NM	

== Badminton ==
Jamaica qualified a team of four athletes (two men and two women). The team was named on June 2, 2015.

Men

Athlete	Event	First round	Second round	Third round	Quarterfinals	Semifinals	Final	Rank
Athlete	Event	Opposition Result	Opposition Result	Opposition Result	Opposition Result	Opposition Result	Opposition Result	Rank
Gareth Henry	Singles	Bye	D’Souza (CAN); L (21–16, 16–21, 11–21)	did not advance				
Dayvon Reid	Singles	Bye	Cordón (GUA); L (12–21, 14–21)	did not advance				
Gareth Henry; Dayvon Reid	Doubles	—N/a	—N/a	Diaz / Macagno (ARG); W (21–15, 21–14)	Chew / Pongnairat (USA); L (14–21, 17–21)	did not advance		

Women

Athlete	Event	First round	Second round	Third round	Quarterfinals	Semifinals	Final	Rank
Athlete	Event	Opposition Result	Opposition Result	Opposition Result	Opposition Result	Opposition Result	Opposition Result	Rank
Ruth Williams	Singles	Bye	Chou (MEX); L (14–21, 12–21)	did not advance				
Katherine Wynter	Singles	Bye	Ugalde (GUA); L (12–21, 14–21)	did not advance				
Ruth Williams; Katherine Wynter	Doubles	—N/a	—N/a	Macias / Nishimura (PER); L (13–21, 7–21)	did not advance			

Mixed

Athlete	Event	First round	Second round	Quarterfinals	Semifinals	Final	Rank
Athlete	Event	Opposition Result	Opposition Result	Opposition Result	Opposition Result	Mixed doubles	Rank
Gareth Henry; Katherine Wynter	Doubles	Zambrano / Zambrano (ECU); W (23–21, 21–19)	Javier / Saturria (DOM); W (21–17, 17–21, 23–21)	Tjong / Vicente (BRA); L (11–21, 17–21)	did not advance		
Dayvon Reid; Ruth Williams	Doubles	Sanchez Lama / Ortiz Prada (VEN); W (21–14, 21–14)	Cuba / Winder (PER); L (19–21, 11–21)	did not advance			

== Cycling ==
Jamaica received a reallocated spot in the men's BMX category.

BMX

Athlete	Event	Seeding		Quarterfinal		Semifinal		Final	
Athlete	Event	Result	Rank	Points	Rank	Time	Rank	Time	Rank
Maliek Byndloss	Men's BMX	42.760	18	11	4 Q	48.100	8	did not advance	

== Diving ==
Jamaica qualified one male diver.

Men

Athlete	Event	Preliminary		Final	
Athlete	Event	Points	Rank	Points	Rank
Yona Knight-Wisdom	3 m springboard	362.50	9 Q	380.00	10

== Golf ==
Jamaica received a reallocated spot in the men's individual event.

Men

Athlete	Event	Final					
Athlete	Event	Round 1	Round 2	Round 3	Round 4	Total	Rank
Ian Facey	Individual	77	80	76	81	314	30

== Shooting ==
Jamaica received a reallocation quota in the men's rifle category.

Men

Athlete	Event	Qualification		Final	
Athlete	Event	Points	Rank	Points	Rank
Dwayne Ford	50 metre rifle prone	577.8	28	did not advance	

== Swimming ==
Jamaica qualified five swimmers (four women and one man).

Key

- Note – Ranks given are for the entire round
- FB = Qualified for the B Final
- FA = Qualified for the A Final
- DNS = Did not start

Men

Athlete	Event	Heat		Final	
Athlete	Event	Time	Rank	Time	Rank
Timothy Wynter	100 m freestyle	52.59	18 QB	52.23	14
Timothy Wynter	100 m backstroke	57.86	14 QB	57.47	13
Timothy Wynter	200 m backstroke	2:07.17	17 QB	2:07.78	16

Women

Athlete	Event	Heat		Final	
Athlete	Event	Time	Rank	Time	Rank
Alia Atkinson	100 m freestyle	56.29	11 QB	DNS	
Alia Atkinson	100 m breaststroke	1:07.46	3 QA	1:06.59	2nd place, silver medalist(s)
Alia Atkinson	200 m breaststroke	2:28.86	6 QA	2:27.15	4
Alia Atkinson	200 m individual medley	2:15.16	5 QA	2:18.02	8
Trudian Patrick	50 m freestyle	27.99	25	did not advance	
Trudian Patrick	100 m butterfly	1:04.43	18	did not advance	
Trudian Patrick	200 m butterfly	2:24.26	16 QB	2:23.65	16
Alia Atkinson; Danielle Boothe; Trudian Patrick; Breanna Roman	4 × 100 m freestyle relay	3:59.09	8 Q	3:56.01	8
Alia Atkinson; Danielle Boothe; Trudian Patrick; Breanna Roman	4 × 100 m medley relay	4:24.18	7 Q	4:14.58	7

== Taekwondo ==
Jamaica qualified a team of two athletes (one man and one woman).

Athlete	Event	First round	Quarterfinals	Semifinals	Repechage	Bronze Medal	Final	
Athlete	Event	Opposition Result	Opposition Result	Opposition Result	Opposition Result	Opposition Result	Opposition Result	Rank
Kenneth Edwards	Men's +80 kg	(United States) Philip Yun; L 0–7	did not advance					
Cyriese Hall	Women's -49 kg	(Dominican Republic) Candelaria Martes; L 2–12	did not advance					

== See also ==
- Jamaica at the 2016 Summer Olympics
