= Jamaica at the Pan American Games =

- IOC code: JAM
- NOC: Jamaica Olympic Association
- Medals Ranked 13th: Gold 31 Silver 49 Bronze 69 Total 149

Pan American Games appearances (overview)
- 1951; 1955; 1959; 1963; 1967; 1971; 1975; 1979; 1983; 1987; 1991; 1995; 1999; 2003; 2007; 2011; 2015; 2019; 2023

Jamaica at the Pan American Games.

At the most recent games in 2019, Jamaica won a record 19 medals.

== Medal count ==
=== Pan Am Games ===
Year	Host city	Gold	Silver	Bronze	Total
1951	Buenos Aires	0	0	3	3
1955	Mexico City	0	2	1	3
1959	Chicago	2	4	8	14
1963	São Paulo	0	2	2	4
1967	Winnipeg	0	0	3	3
1971	Cali	4	3	4	11
1975	Mexico City	0	1	3	4
1979	San Juan	0	4	1	5
1983	Caracas	0	0	6	6
1987	Indianapolis	2	3	8	13
1991	Havana	2	1	5	8
1995	Mar del Plata	0	2	2	4
1999	Winnipeg	3	4	6	13
2003	Santo Domingo	5	2	6	13
2007	Rio de Janeiro	3	5	1	9
2011	Guadalajara	1	5	1	7
2015	Toronto	3	4	2	9
2019	Lima	6	6	7	19
2023	Santiago	1	0	5	6
Total		32	49	74	155

=== Junior Pan American Games ===
- (Colombia) 2021 Cali-Valle
- (Paraguay) 2025 Asunción Future event
