= Jamaica at the 1995 Pan American Games =

- IOC code: JAM
- NOC: Jamaica Olympic Association

in Mar del Plata 11–26 March 1995
- Medals Ranked 18th: Gold 0 Silver 2 Bronze 2 Total 4

Pan American Games appearances (overview)
- 1951; 1955; 1959; 1963; 1967; 1971; 1975; 1979; 1983; 1987; 1991; 1995; 1999; 2003; 2007; 2011; 2015; 2019; 2023

Jamaica competed at the 12th Pan American Games, which were held in Mar del Plata, Argentina from 11 to 26 March 1995.

== Medals ==
=== Silver ===
===== Athletics =====
- Women's 200 metres: Dahlia Duhaney
- Men's 4x400 metres: Orville Taylor, Dennis Blake, Roxbert Martin, and Michael McDonald

=== Bronze ===
===== Badminton =====
- Men's Doubles:
- Mixed Doubles:

== See also ==
- Jamaica at the 1994 Commonwealth Games
- Jamaica at the 1996 Summer Olympics
