= Jamaica at the 2023 Pan American Games =

- IOC code: JAM
- NOC: Jamaica Olympic Association

in Santiago, Chile 20 October 2023 – 5 November 2023
- Competitors: 58 in 10 sports
- Flag bearers (opening): Samuel Ricketts & Tyesha Mattis
- Flag bearer (closing): Tahjay Solomon
- Medals Ranked 22nd: Gold 1 Silver 0 Bronze 5 Total 6

Pan American Games appearances (overview)
- 1951; 1955; 1959; 1963; 1967; 1971; 1975; 1979; 1983; 1987; 1991; 1995; 1999; 2003; 2007; 2011; 2015; 2019; 2023

Jamaica is scheduled to compete at the 2023 Pan American Games in Santiago, Chile from October 20 to November 5, 2023. This will be Jamaica's 19th appearance at the Pan American Games, having competed at every edition of the Games.

Badminton athlete Samuel Ricketts and artistic gymnast Tyesha Mattis were the country's flagbearers during the opening ceremony. Meanwhile, e-sports athlete Tahjay Solomon (competing as part of the concurrent Pan American e-sports championships) was the country's flagbearer during the closing ceremony.

== Competitors ==
The following is the list of number of competitors (per gender) participating at the games per sport/discipline.

Sport	Men	Women	Total
Athletics	15	15	30
Badminton	2	2	4
Basketball	0	4	4
Boxing	2	0	2
Canoeing	1	0	1
Cycling	0	2	2
Football	0	18	18
Gymnastics	1	1	2
Rugby sevens	12	12	24
Taekwondo	1	0	1
Weightlifting	0	1	1
Wrestling	1	0	1
Total	20	40	60

== Medalists ==
The following Jamaican competitors won medals at the games. In the by discipline sections below, medalists' names are bolded.

Medal	Name	Sport	Event	Date
Gold	Jaheel Hyde	Athletics	Men's 400 metres hurdles	November 3
Bronze	Dahlia Palmer	Cycling	Women's keirin	October 25
Bronze	Fedrick Dacres	Athletics	Men's discus throw	October 30
Bronze	Samantha Hall	Athletics	Women's discus throw	October 30
Bronze	Aaron Johnson	Wrestling	Men's freestyle 125 kg	November 1
Bronze	Navasky Anderson	Athletics	Men's 800 metres	November 4

== Athletics ==
Jamaica Athletics squad list was delayed, since many of their top athletes recently ended their season. However a few field athletes participate in the Games

Men
Track & road events

Athlete	Event	Semifinal		Final	
Athlete	Event	Time	Rank	Time	Rank
Jaheel Hyde	400 m hurdles				1st place, gold medalist(s)

== Badminton ==
Jamaica qualified a team of four athletes (two men and two women).

Men

Athlete	Event	First round	Second round	Quarterfinals	Semifinals	Final / BM	
Athlete	Event	Opposition Result	Opposition Result	Opposition Result	Opposition Result	Opposition Result	Rank
Bradley Evans	Singles	Opti (SUR)					
Samuel Ricketts	Singles	Garrido (MEX)					
Bradley Evans; Samuel Ricketts	Doubles	Fabricio Farias (BRA); Davi Silva (BRA)	—N/a				

Women

Athlete	Event	First round	Second round	Third round	Quarterfinals	Semifinals	Final / BM	
Athlete	Event	Opposition Result	Opposition Result	Opposition Result	Opposition Result	Opposition Result	Opposition Result	Rank
Tahila Richardson	Singles	Bye						
Katherine Wynter	Singles	Siviora (BOL)						
Tahila Richardson; Katherine Wynter	Doubles	Astorga Camila (CHI); Santos Valeria (CHI)	—N/a					

Mixed

Athlete	Event	First round	Second round	Quarterfinals	Semifinals	Final / BM	
Athlete	Event	Opposition Result	Opposition Result	Opposition Result	Opposition Result	Opposition Result	Rank
Samuel Ricketts; Tahlia Richardson	Doubles	Bye					
Bradley Evans; Katherine Wynter	Doubles	Juan Bencomo Otaño (CUB); Yeily Ortiz Rodriguez (CUB)					

== Basketball ==
3x3

=== Women's tournament ===
Jamaica qualified a women's team (of 4 athletes) by finishing fifth at the 2022 FIBA 3x3 Americup.

Summary

Team	Event	Preliminary round						Semifinal	Final / BM / Pl.	
Team	Event	Opposition Result	Opposition Result	Opposition Result	Opposition Result	Opposition Result	Rank	Opposition Result	Opposition Result	Rank
Jamaica women	Women's tournament									

== Boxing ==
Jamaica qualified two male boxers.

Athlete	Event	Quarterfinal	Semifinal	Final	
Athlete	Event	Opposition Result	Opposition Result	Opposition Result	Rank
Sanji Williams	Men's –63.5 kg				
Jaden Eccleston	Men's –80 kg				

== Canoeing ==
=== Slalom ===
Jamaica qualified a male slalom athlete.

Athlete	Event	Preliminary round			Heat		Semifinal		Final	
Athlete	Event	Run 1	Run 2	Rank	Time	Rank	Time	Rank	Time	Rank
Soloman Maragh	Men's K-1				—N/a					

== Cycling ==
Jamaica qualified two female cyclists.

=== Track ===
Sprint

Athlete	Event	Qualification		Round of 16	Repechage 1	Quarterfinals	Semifinals	Final	
Athlete	Event	Time	Rank	Opposition Time	Opposition Time	Opposition Result	Opposition Result	Opposition Result	Rank
	Women's individual								

Keirin

Athlete	Event	Heats	Repechage	Final
Athlete	Event	Rank	Rank	Rank
Dahlia Palmer	Women's			Bronze

== Football ==
=== Women's tournament ===
Jamaica qualified a women's team of 18 athletes after finishing as the top ranked Caribbean team at the 2022 CONCACAF W Championship.

Summary

Key:

- A.E.T – After extra time.
- P – Match decided by penalty-shootout.

Team	Event	Group Stage				Semifinal	Final / BM	
Team	Event	Opposition Score	Opposition Score	Opposition Score	Rank	Opposition Score	Opposition Score	Rank
Jamaica women's	Women's tournament							

== Gymnastics ==
=== Artistic ===
Jamaica qualified two gymnasts in artistic (one man and one woman) at the 2023 Pan American Championships.

Men

Athlete	Event	Qualification						Total	Rank
Athlete	Event	F	PH	R	V	PB	HB	Total	Rank
	Individual all-around								

Qualification Legend: Q = Qualified to apparatus final

Women

Athlete	Event	Qualification				Total	Rank
Athlete	Event	V	UB	BB	F	Total	Rank
	Individual all-around						

Qualification Legend: Q = Qualified to apparatus final

== Rugby sevens ==
=== Men's tournament ===
Jamaica qualified a men's team (of 12 athletes) by reaching the final of the 2022 RAN Super Sevens.

Summary

Team	Event	Group stage				Semifinal	Final / BM / Pl.	
Team	Event	Opposition Result	Opposition Result	Opposition Result	Rank	Opposition Result	Opposition Result	Rank
Jamaica men	Men's tournament							

=== Women's tournament ===
Jamaica qualified a women's team (of 12 athletes) by reaching the final of the 2022 RAN Women's Super Sevens

Summary

Team	Event	Group stage				Semifinal	Final / BM / Pl.	
Team	Event	Opposition Result	Opposition Result	Opposition Result	Rank	Opposition Result	Opposition Result	Rank
Jamaica women	Women's tournament							

== Taekwondo ==
Jamaica has qualified one male athlete during the Pan American Games Qualification Tournament.

Kyorugi

Athlete	Event	Round of 16	Quarterfinals	Semifinals	Repechage	Final/ BM	
Athlete	Event	Opposition Result	Opposition Result	Opposition Result	Opposition Result	Opposition Result	Rank
	–80 kg						

== Weightlifting ==
Jamaica was awarded a wildcard to send one female weightlifter.

Athlete	Event	Snatch		Clean & Jerk		Total	Rank
Athlete	Event	Result	Rank	Result	Rank	Total	Rank

== Wrestling ==
Jamaica qualified a male wrestler through the 2022 Pan American Wrestling Championships and the 2023 Pan American Wrestling Championships.

Key:

- VT – Victory by fall.
- PP – Decision by points – the loser with technical points.
- PO – Decision by points – the loser without technical points.
- SP – Technical superiority – the loser with technical points and a margin of victory of at least 9 (Greco-Roman) or 10 (freestyle) points.
- ST – Great superiority – the loser without technical points and a margin of victory of at least 8 (Greco-Roman) or 10 (freestyle) points.
- VA – Decision by withdrawal

Men

Athlete	Event	Quarterfinal	Semifinal	Final / BM	
Athlete	Event	Opposition Result	Opposition Result	Opposition Result	Rank
Aaron Johnson	Freestyle 125 kg				Bronze
