= Ornella Livingston =

Jamaican sprinter (born 1991)

Personal information
- Born: 19 May 1991 (age 34) St. Ann Parish, Jamaica

Sport
- Sport: Track and field
- Club: St. Augustine's Falcons

Ornella Livingston (born 19 May 1991) is a Jamaican former sprinter who represented Jamaica at the CARIFTA Games and the Pan American Games.
