= Surinamese National Badminton Club Championships =

The Surinamese National Badminton Club Championships, locally called in Dutch "Nationale Clubkampioenschappen" is the badminton league organized by the Surinaamse Badminton Bond (SBB) the governing body for the sport of badminton in Suriname, to crown the best badminton clubteams in Suriname. There used to be different levels for teams, premier A-Class called "Hoofdklasse", First division called "1e Klasse" and a Second division called "2e Klasse". For juniors there first used to be only an under-19 (U-19) age class, later changed in an under-21 (U-21) age class and under-17 (U-17) age class. From 2001 an under-15 (U-15) age class was added, but this changed in 2005 to an under-13 (U-13) age class.

The first official edition was held in 1964 and won by Badminton Club Paramaribo with BC Amicitia ending runners-up. The last edition to date has been held by the S.B.B. in 2017 for juniors U-13 and U-17 age groups. Prior to the first official championships there was a team club event in Suriname held from 1958 - 1960 followed up by an inter-club team Cup trophy event called the Shell Badminton Cup (Shell wisselbeker Toernooi) from 1963 till 1966. These were the inaugural National Club Championships for Suriname. For individual titles each year the S.B.B. is organizing the Surinamese National Badminton Championships and the Surinamese National Junior Badminton Championships.

== Champions Hoofdklasse (Premier Class) A-Class ==
| Season | Winner |
|---|---|
| 1964 | BC Paramaribo |
| 1965 | BC Magic Stars |
| 1966 | BC Magic Stars |
| 1967 | BC Tsang Ngen Foei (T.N.F.) |
| 1968 | BC Magic Stars |
| 1969 | BC Magic Stars |
| 1970 | BC Tsang Ngen Foei (T.N.F.) |
| 1971 | National Club Championships not held |
| 1972 | BC Magic Stars |
| 1973 | BC Magic Stars |
| 1974 | National Club Championships not held |
| 1975 | BC Tsang Ngen Foei (T.N.F.) |
| 1976 | BC Tsang Ngen Foei (T.N.F.) |
| 1977 | BC Magic Stars |
| 1978 | BC Magic Stars |
| 1979 | BC Tsang Ngen Foei (T.N.F.) |
| 1980 | BC Tsang Ngen Foei (T.N.F.) |
| 1981 | BC Tsang Ngen Foei (T.N.F.) |
| 1982 | BC Tsang Ngen Foei (T.N.F.) |
| 1983 | BC Tsang Ngen Foei (T.N.F.) |
| 1984 | BC Tsang Ngen Foei (T.N.F.) |
| 1985 | Sport Vereniging Strijd en Overwinning (SV STENOV) |
| 1986 | Sociaal Culturele Vereniging Uitvlugt (SCVU) |
| 1987 | BC Tsang Ngen Foei (T.N.F.) |
| 1988 | BC Tsang Ngen Foei (T.N.F.) |
| 1989 | National Club Championships not held |
| 1990 | Sociaal Culturele Vereniging Uitvlugt (SCVU) |
| 1991 | Sociaal Culturele Vereniging Uitvlugt (SCVU) |
| 1992 | Sociaal Culturele Vereniging Uitvlugt (SCVU) |
| 1993 | Sociaal Culturele Vereniging Uitvlugt (SCVU) |
| 1994; 1998 | National Club Championships not held |
| 1999 (Challenge) | Sociaal Culturele Vereniging Uitvlugt (SCVU) |
| 2000; 2001 | National Club Championships not held |
| 2002 | |
| 2003 | |
| 2004 | National Club Championships not held |
| 2005 | |
| 2006 | |
| 2007 | |
| 2008 | National Club Championships not held |
| 2009 | |
| 2010 | |
| 2011 | BC Tan Na Fesi (T.N.F.) |
| 2012 | BC Tan Na Fesi (T.N.F.) |
| 2013 | Sociaal Culturele Vereniging Uitvlugt (SCVU) |
| 2014 | BC Tan Na Fesi (T.N.F.) |
| 2015 | BC Tan Na Fesi (T.N.F.) |
| 2016 | National Club Championships Class A not held |
| 2017 | Team Mitchel (Friendly inter team match against Team Redon) |
| 2018; 2023 | National Club Championships not held |

== Champions Inaugural Inter-Club tournament "Championship of Paramaribo" ==
| Season | Winner |
|---|---|
| 1958 | Het Park |
| 1959 | Ferson |
| 1960 | |

== Champions Inaugural Shell Badminton Cup ==
| Season | Winner |
|---|---|
| 1963 | BC Paramaribo |
| 1964 | Castrol Sport Club |
| 1965 | BC Magic Stars |
| 1966 | BC Magic Stars |

== Champions 1e klasse (First Division) B-Class ==
| Season | Winner |
|---|---|
| 1965 | R.S.L. (Ridderlijkheid en Sportiviteit Lonen) |
| 1966 | BC Tsang Ngen Foei (T.N.F.) |
| 1967 | BC Fajalobi (From Billiton) |
| 1968 | |
| 1969 | |
| 1970 | |
| 1971 | National Club Championships not held |
| 1972 | |
| 1973 | BC Paramaribo |
| 1974 | National Club Championships not held |
| 1975 | |
| 1976 | |
| 1977 | Flying Shuttle Tropica |
| 1978 | |
| 1979 | William Stars |
| 1980 | |
| 1981 | |
| 1982 | |
| 1983 | |
| 1984 | |
| 1985 | |
| 1986 | |
| 1987 | |
| 1988 | |
| 1989 | National Club Championships not held |
| 1990 | |
| 1991 | |
| 1992 | |
| 1993 | |
| 1994; 2002 | National Club Championships B-Class not held |
| 2003 | |
| 2004; 2008 | National Club Championships B-Class not held |
| 2009 | |
| 2010 | |
| 2011 | BC Perfect Flying Feathers-3 (P.F.F. 3) |
| 2012 | Sociaal Culturele Vereniging Uitvlugt-2 (SCVU-2) |
| 2013 | BC Perfect Flying Feathers-2 (P.F.F. 2) |
| 2014 | BC Tan Na Fesi-2 (T.N.F. 2) |
| 2015 | BC Perfect Flying Feathers-1 (P.F.F. 1) |
| 2016 | Sociaal Culturele Vereniging Uitvlugt-1 (SCVU-1) |
| 2017 | BC Perfect Flying Feathers-1 (P.F.F. 1) |
| 2018; 2024 | National Club Championships not held |

== Champions Junior (Jeugd) Age Classes ==
| Season | Age Class | Winner |
|---|---|---|
| 1967 | U-17 | Billiton B.C. |
| 1968 | U-17 | |
| 1969 | U-17 | |
| 1970 | U-17 | |
| 1971 | N/A | National Club Championships not held |
| 1972 | U-19 | R.S.L. (Ridderlijkheid en Sportiviteit Lonen) |
| 1973 | U-19 | |
| 1974 | N/A | National Club Championships not held |
| 1975 | U-19 | |
| 1976 | U-19 | BC Tsang Ngen Foei-3 (T.N.F. 3) |
| 1977 | U-19 | BC A.B.O.-1 |
| 1978 | U-19 | BC A.B.O.-1 |
| 1979 | U-19 | |
| 1980 | U-19 | |
| 1981 | U-19 | BC A.B.O. |
| 1982 | U-19 | |
| 1983 | U-19 | BC Tsang Ngen Foei-1 (T.N.F. 1) |
| 1984 | U-19 | |
| 1985 | U-19 | |
| 1986 | U-19 | B.C. ARROW-1 |
| 1987 | U-19 | |
| 1988 | U-19 | Yellow Birds |
| 1989 | N/A | National Club Championships not held |
| 1990 | U-19 | B.C. Lelydorp-1 (B.C.L. 1) |
| 1991 | U-19 | B.C. Lelydorp-1 (B.C.L. 1) |
| 1992 | U-19 | B.C. Lelydorp-1 (B.C.L. 1) |
| 1993 | U-19 | |
| 1994; 1999 | N/A | National Club Championships not held |
| 2000 | U-21A | Sociaal Culturele Vereniging Uitvlugt (SCVU) |
| 2000 | U-21B | BC Perfect Flying Feathers-1 (P.F.F. 1) |
| 2001 | U-21A | BC Tan Na Fesi-3 (T.N.F. 3) |
| 2001 | U-21B | BC Perfect Flying Feathers-2 (P.F.F. 2) |
| 2001 | U-15 | Sociaal Culturele Vereniging Uitvlugt-3 (SCVU 3) |
| 2002 | U-19 | |
| 2002 | U-15 | |
| 2003 | U-19 | |
| 2003 | U-15 | |
| 2004 | N/A | National Club Championships not held |
| 2005 | U-17 | BC Tan Na Fesi-1 (T.N.F. 1) |
| 2005 | U-13 | Sociaal Culturele Vereniging Uitvlugt-3 (SCVU 3) |
| 2006 | U-21A | Sociaal Culturele Vereniging Uitvlugt-1 (SCVU 1) |
| 2006 | U-21B | Nieuw Stenov |
| 2006 | U-17 | BC Tan Na Fesi-1 (T.N.F. 1) |
| 2006 | U-13 | Sociaal Culturele Vereniging Uitvlugt-4 (SCVU 4) |
| 2011 | U-17 | BC Tan Na Fesi-3 (T.N.F. 3) |
| 2011 | U-13 | Sociaal Culturele Vereniging Uitvlugt-5 (SCVU 5) |
| 2012 | U-17 | Sociaal Culturele Vereniging Uitvlugt-4 (SCVU 4) |
| 2012 | U-13 | Sociaal Culturele Vereniging Uitvlugt-9 (SCVU 9) |
| 2013 | U-17 | Sociaal Culturele Vereniging Uitvlugt-4 (SCVU 4) |
| 2013 | U-13 | Sociaal Culturele Vereniging Uitvlugt-7 (SCVU 7) |
| 2014 | U-17 | BC Tan Na Fesi-3 (T.N.F. 3) |
| 2014 | U-13 | BC Perfect Flying Feathers-5 (P.F.F. 5) |
| 2015 | U-17 | BC Tan Na Fesi-3 (T.N.F. 3) |
| 2015 | U-13 | BC Golden Eagles |
| 2016 | U-17 | BC Tan Na Fesi-3 (T.N.F. 3) |
| 2016 | U-13 | |
| 2017 | U-17 | BC Perfect Flying Feathers (P.F.F.) |
| 2017 | U-13 | BC Golden Eagles |
| 2018; 2024 | N/A | National Club Championships not held |
