= 2016 U.S. Open Grand Prix Gold =

Tournament details
- Dates: 5–10 July 2016
- Level: Grand Prix Gold
- Total prize money: US$120,000
- Venue: Los Angeles Badminton Club
- Location: El Monte, California, United States

Champions
- Men's singles: (South Korea) Lee Hyun-il
- Women's singles: (Japan) Ayumi Mine
- Men's doubles: (Denmark) Mathias Boe (Denmark) Carsten Mogensen
- Women's doubles: (Japan) Shiho Tanaka (Japan) Koharu Yonemoto
- Mixed doubles: (Japan) Yugo Kobayashi (Japan) Wakana Nagahara

The 2016 U.S. Open Grand Prix Gold, is the tenth Grand Prix's badminton tournament of the 2016 BWF Grand Prix and Grand Prix Gold. The tournament will be held in Los Angeles, United States on 5–10 July 2016 and has a total purse of $120,000.

== Men's singles ==
=== Seeds ===
1. (India) Srikanth Kidambi (withdrew)
2. (Germany) Marc Zwiebler (withdrew)
3. (England) Rajiv Ouseph (withdrew)
4. (India) Ajay Jayaram (semifinal)
5. (India) H. S. Prannoy (third round)
6. (India) B. Sai Praneeth (third round)
7. (Vietnam) Nguyen Tien Minh (withdrew)
8. (Spain) Pablo Abián (quarterfinal)

=== Finals ===
Quarterfinals
(Israel) Misha Zilberman	13	17
(South Korea) Lee Hyun-il	21	21
(Guatemala) Kevin Cordón	21	21
(Japan) Kazumasa Sakai	18	14
(India) Anand Pawar	11	11
4	(India) Ajay Jayaram	21	21
8	(Spain) Pablo Abián	23	16	15
(Japan) Kanta Tsuneyama	21	21	21

Semifinals
(South Korea) Lee Hyun-il	21	21
(Guatemala) Kevin Cordón	16	8
4	(India) Ajay Jayaram	10	14
(Japan) Kanta Tsuneyama	21	21

Final
(South Korea) Lee Hyun-il	24	21
(Japan) Kanta Tsuneyama	22	8

=== Top half ===
==== Section 1 ====
First round
1	(India) S Kimdambi
BYE
(India) H Dani	18	18
(Israel) M Zilberman	21	21
(Guatemala) R Castellanos	21	21
(Trinidad and Tobago) N Bonkowsky	11	12
(Nepal) R Tamang	w	/	o
(Japan) R Takeshita

Second round
1	(India) S Kimdambi
(Israel) M Zilberman	w	/	o
(Guatemala) R Castellanos	21	15	8
(Nepal) R Tamang	18	21	21

Third round
(Israel) M Zilberman	21	21
(Nepal) R Tamang	14	14

==== Section 2 ====
First round
5	(India) H. S. Prannoy	21	21
(United States) C Lin	7	6
(Republic of Ireland) J Magee	23	21
(United States) S Pongnairat	21	19
(Austria) R Gnedt	16	6
(United States) T Lam	21	21
(France) B Leverdez	18	17
(South Korea) Lee H-i	21	21

Second round
5	(India) H. S. Prannoy	21	21
(Republic of Ireland) J Magee	9	8
(United States) T Lam	14	14
(South Korea) Lee H-i	21	21

Third round
5	(India) H. S. Prannoy	23	21
(South Korea) Lee H-i	25	23

==== Section 3 ====
First round
3	(England) R Ouseph
BYE
(Denmark) C L Thomsen	14	21	21
(United States) H L Lee	21	18	19
(Mexico) L Munoz
(Guatemala) K Cordón	w	/	o
(Sweden) M Westerback	17	26	16
(Poland) A Dziolko	21	24	21

Second round
3	(England) R Ouseph
(Denmark) C L Thomsen	w	/	o
(Guatemala) K Cordón	21	21
(Poland) A Dziolko	13	17

Third round
(Denmark) C L Thomsen	16	15
(Guatemala) K Cordón	21	21

==== Section 4 ====
First round
6	(India) B. S Praneeth	21	21
(Sweden) H Hurskainen	13	12
(United States) D Schoppe	7	3
(Canada) B. R. Sankeerth	21	21
(United States) P Jap	8	13
(India) R. M. V. Gurusaidutt	21	21
(Japan) K Sakai	21	21
(Guatemala) A Marroquin	10	9

Second round
6	(India) B. S Praneeth	21	21
(Canada) B. R. Sankeerth	15	7
(India) R. M. V. Gurusaidutt	17	12
(Japan) K Sakai	21	21

Third round
6	(India) B. S Praneeth	21	17	20
(Japan) K Sakai	13	21	22

=== Bottom half ===
==== Section 5 ====
First round
(Canada) K Golding	9	15
(Czech Republic) M Ludík	21	21
(India) P Joshi	21	21
(Canada) K Barkman	13	13
(India) A Pawar	21	21
(Denmark) P Sovndal	7	7
(Austria) D Obernosterer	w	/	o
7	(Vietnam) Nguyen T M

Second round
(Czech Republic) M Ludík	18	13
(India) P Joshi	21	21
(India) A Pawar	21	21
(Austria) D Obernosterer	12	9

Third round
(India) P Joshi	10	13
(India) A Pawar	21	21

==== Section 6 ====
First round
(Indonesia) D Pandu	12	3
(Japan) K Naraoka	21	21
(Malaysia) Z Zulkiffli
(Portugal) P Martins	w	/	o
(United States) M Y Ong	9	13
(Estonia) R Must	21	21
(Denmark) J Persson
4	(India) A Jayaram	w	/	o

Second round
(Japan) K Naraoka	18	14
(Portugal) P Martins	21	21
(Estonia) R Must	14	9
4	(India) A Jayaram	21	21

Third round
(Portugal) P Martins	11	15
4	(India) A Jayaram	21	21

==== Section 7 ====
First round
(Mexico) H A Fajardo	21	21
(United States) A Viettry	4	13
(United States) H Shu	21	12	21
(Brazil) Y C D Oliveira	12	21	14
(Canada) T Chiu	21	21
(United States) Y T Chan	16	11
(Canada) M Giuffre	19	21	8
8	(Spain) P Abián	21	15	21

Second round
(Mexico) H A Fajardo	16	12
(United States) H Shu	21	21
(Canada) T Chiu	19	10
8	(Spain) P Abián	21	21

Third round
(United States) H Shu	13	14
8	(Spain) P Abián	21	21

==== Section 8 ====
First round
(Sweden) M Borg	13	22	18
(Japan) H Shimono	21	20	21
(Sri Lanka) N Karunaratne	21	21
(Guatemala) R Ramírez	17	12
(Japan) K Tsuneyama	21	21
(Nepal) B Shrestha	8	9
BYE
2	(Germany) M Zwiebler

Second round
(Japan) H Shimono	14	20
(Sri Lanka) N Karunaratne	21	22
(Japan) K Tsuneyama	w	/	o
2	(Germany) M Zwiebler

Third round
(Sri Lanka) N Karunaratne	21	7	12
(Japan) K Tsuneyama	19	21	21

== Women's singles ==
=== Seeds ===
1. (Scotland) Kirsty Gilmour (withdrew)
2. (Canada) Michelle Li (semifinal)
3. (Japan) Yui Hashimoto (quarterfinal)
4. (Japan) Kaori Imabeppu (second round)
5. (United States) Zhang Beiwen (quarterfinal)
6. (United States) Iris Wang (first round)
7. (Bulgaria) Linda Zetchiri (semifinal)
8. (Japan) Aya Ohori (second round)

=== Finals ===
Semifinals
7	(Bulgaria) Linda Zetchiri	20	12
(Japan) Ayumi Mine	22	21
(Japan) Saena Kawakami	21	21
2	(Canada) Michelle Li	18	12

Final
(Japan) Ayumi Mine	16	21	21
(Japan) Saena Kawakami	21	11	15

=== Top half ===
==== Section 1 ====
First round
PFQ	(United States) J W Myers	5	4
(Canada) R Honderich	21	21
(United States) M Chen	13	8
(Republic of Ireland) C Magee	21	22
7	(Bulgaria) L Zetchiri	21	21
(United States) C Pan	18	11
Q1	(Canada) Q Ouyang	14	21	14
(Denmark) J Finne-Ipsen	21	11	21

Second round
(Canada) R Honderich	16	11
(Republic of Ireland) C Magee	21	21
7	(Bulgaria) L Zetchiri	21	21
(Denmark) J Finne-Ipsen	3	19

Quarterfinals
(Republic of Ireland) C Magee	20	12
7	(Bulgaria) L Zetchiri	22	21

==== Section 2 ====
First round
3	(Japan) Y Hashimoto	21	21
Q4	(Canada) O Lei	9	10
(Brazil) L Vicente	21	17	21
(Italy) J Cicognini	19	21	13
6	(United States) I Wang	17	16
(Vietnam) Vu T T	21	21
(India) R S Gadde	19	21	18
(Japan) A Mine	21	15	21

Second round
3	(Japan) Y Hashimoto	21	21
(Brazil) L Vicente	13	3
(Vietnam) Vu T T	17	6
(Japan) A Mine	21	21

Quarterfinals
3	(Japan) Y Hashimoto	15	14
(Japan) A Mine	21	21

=== Bottom half ===
==== Section 3 ====
First round
(France) D Lansac	21	21
Q3	(United States) K Xu	18	16
(Switzerland) S Jaquet	21	24
8	(Japan) A Ohori	23	26
(Japan) S Kawakami	21	21
(Spain) B Corrales	12	11
(United States) J Yee	3	1
4	(Japan) K Imabeppu	21	21

Second round
(France) D Lansac	21	23
8	(Japan) A Ohori	14	21
(Japan) S Kawakami	21	21
4	(Japan) K Imabeppu	10	15

Quarterfinals
(France) D Lansac	21	13	12
(Japan) S Kawakami	19	21	21

==== Section 4 ====
First round
(India) T Lad	21	21
(Guatemala) N A Sotomayor	6	9
(Austria) E Baldauf	12	18
5	(United States) Zhang BW	21	21
Q2	(Canada) T Yi	21	21
(Nepal) N Tamang	7	8
(United States) D Gupta	18	7
2	(Canada) M Li	21	21

Second round
(India) T Lad	17	15
5	(United States) Zhang BW	21	21
Q2	(Canada) T Yi	12	20
2	(Canada) M Li	21	22

Quarterfinals
5	(United States) Zhang BW	14	10
2	(Canada) M Li	21	21

== Men's doubles ==
=== Seeds ===
1. (Denmark) Mathias Boe / Carsten Mogensen (champion)
2. (India) Manu Attri / B. Sumeeth Reddy (quarterfinal)
3. (Poland) Adam Cwalina / Przemyslaw Wacha (semifinal)
4. (India) Pranaav Jerry Chopra / Akshay Dewalkar (withdrew)

=== Finals ===
Semifinals

Final

1
- (Denmark) Mathias Boe
- (Denmark) Carsten Mogensen
21
21

- (Japan) Takuto Inoue
- (Japan) Yuki Kaneko
17
16

1
- (Denmark) Mathias Boe
- (Denmark) Carsten Mogensen
21
22

- (Japan) Takuro Hoki
- (Japan) Yugo Kobayashi
11
20

3
- (Poland) Adam Cwalina
- (Poland) Przemyslaw Wacha
15
21
13

- (Japan) Takuro Hoki
- (Japan) Yugo Kobayashi
21
17
21

=== Top half ===
==== Section 1 ====
First round

Second round

Quarterfinals

1
- (Denmark) M Boe
- (Denmark) C Mogensen

BYE

1
- (Denmark) M Boe
- (Denmark) C Mogensen
21
18
22

- (Japan) H Saeki
- (Japan) R Taohata
12
21
20

- (Japan) H Saeki
- (Japan) R Taohata
21
21

- (Guatemala) R Castellanos
- (Guatemala) A Marroquin
4
8

1
- (Denmark) M Boe
- (Denmark) C Mogensen
21
21

- (Japan) T Shimada
- (Japan) Y Takeuchi
16
17

- (United States) Y T Chan
- (United States) C Lin
11
10

- (Australia) M Chau
- (Australia) S Serasinghe
21
21

- (Australia) M Chau
- (Australia) S Serasinghe
19
16

- (Japan) T Shimada
- (Japan) Y Takeuchi
21
21

- (Vietnam) Bao M
- (Vietnam) Duong B C
9
15

- (Japan) T Shimada
- (Japan) Y Takeuchi
21
21

==== Section 2 ====
First round

Second round

Quarterfinals

4
- (India) P J Chopra
- (India) A Dewalkar

BYE

4
- (India) P J Chopra
- (India) A Dewalkar

- (Japan) T Inoue
- (Japan) Y Kaneko
w
/
o

- (Sweden) R Eidestedt
- (Sweden) N Ruponen
16
21
17

- (Japan) T Inoue
- (Japan) Y Kaneko
21
17
21

- (Japan) T Inoue
- (Japan) Y Kaneko
21
21
23

- (United States) T Gunawan
- (South Korea) Yoo Y-s
18
23
21

- (United States) T Gunawan
- (South Korea) Yoo Y-s
21
21

- (United States) M J Buasan
- (United States) S Gunatileka
11
8

- (United States) T Gunawan
- (South Korea) Yoo Y-s
21
21

- (Canada) A Liu
- (Canada) T Ng
16
13

- (Scotland) A Casey
- (United States) K Emerick
15
11

- (Canada) A Liu
- (Canada) T Ng
21
21

=== Bottom half ===
==== Section 3 ====
First round

Second round

Quarterfinals

- (Czech Republic) M Ludík
- (Denmark) P Sovndal
15
8

- (Canada) A Dong
- (Canada) N Yakura
21
21

- (Canada) A Dong
- (Canada) N Yakura
21
15
21

- (United States) P Chew
- (United States) S Pongnairat
14
21
19

- (United States) P Chew
- (United States) S Pongnairat
21
22

- (Republic of Ireland) J Magee
- (Republic of Ireland) S Magee
15
20

- (Canada) A Dong
- (Canada) N Yakura
15
10

3
- (Poland) A Cwalina
- (Poland) P Wacha
21
21

- (Canada) K Barkman
- (Canada) K Golding
21
23

- (Nepal) B Shrestha
- (Nepal) R Tamang
12
21

- (Canada) K Barkman
- (Canada) K Golding
12
5

3
- (Poland) A Cwalina
- (Poland) P Wacha
21
21

- (United States) C Y Christianto
- (United States) M Y Ong
11
8

3
- (Poland) A Cwalina
- (Poland) P Wacha
21
21

==== Section 4 ====
First round

Second round

Quarterfinals

- (Guatemala) S Jonathan
- (Guatemala) R Ramirez
10
14

- (Japan) T Hoki
- (Japan) Y Kobayashi
21
21

- (Japan) T Hoki
- (Japan) Y Kobayashi
21
21

- (Trinidad and Tobago) N Bonkowsky
- (United States) M Fogarty
2
4

- (United States) D Schoppe
- (United States) A Viettry
14
15

- (Trinidad and Tobago) N Bonkowsky
- (United States) M Fogarty
21
21

- (Japan) T Hoki
- (Japan) Y Kobayashi
18
21
21

2
- (India) M Attri
- (India) B. S Reddy
21
7
16

- (Japan) K Mitsuhashi
- (Japan) Y Watanabe
21
21

- (United States) D Gouw
- (United States) P Jap
5
4

- (Japan) K Mitsuhashi
- (Japan) Y Watanabe
21
13

2
- (India) M Attri
- (India) B. S Reddy
23
21

BYE

2
- (India) M Attri
- (India) B. S Reddy

== Women's doubles ==
=== Seeds ===
1. (India) Jwala Gutta / Ashwini Ponnappa (withdrew)
2. (United States) Eva Lee / Paula Lynn Obanana (semifinal)
3. (Australia) Setyana Mapasa / Gronya Somerville (quarterfinal)
4. (Japan) Shiho Tanaka / Koharu Yonemoto (champion)

=== Finals ===
Semifinals

Final

- (United States) Jing Yu Hong
- (United States) Zhang Beiwen
8
8

- (Japan) Mayu Matsumoto
- (Japan) Wakana Nagahara
21
21

- (Japan) Mayu Matsumoto
- (Japan) Wakana Nagahara
22
15
19

4
- (Japan) Shiho Tanaka
- (Japan) Koharu Yonemoto
20
21
21

4
- (Japan) Shiho Tanaka
- (Japan) Koharu Yonemoto
21
21

2
- (United States) Eva Lee
- (United States) Paula Lynn Obanana
13
13

=== Top half ===
==== Section 1 ====
First round

Second round

Quarterfinals

1
- (India) J Gutta
- (India) A Ponnappa

BYE

1
- (India) J Gutta
- (India) A Ponnappa

- (United States) J Y Hong
- (United States) Zhang BW
w
/
o

- (United States) J Y Hong
- (United States) Zhang BW

BYE

- (United States) J Y Hong
- (United States) Zhang BW
21
21

- (Sweden) C Nistad
- (Sweden) E Wengberg
17
13

- (Sweden) C Nistad
- (Sweden) E Wengberg

BYE

- (Sweden) C Nistad
- (Sweden) E Wengberg
21
21

- (Chinese Taipei) Hung Y-t
- (Chinese Taipei) Su H-l
14
11

- (Chinese Taipei) Hung Y-t
- (Chinese Taipei) Su H-l

BYE

==== Section 2 ====
First round

Second round

Quarterfinals

3
- (Australia) S Mapasa
- (Australia) G Somerville

BYE

3
- (Australia) S Mapasa
- (Australia) G Somerville
23
16
21

- (Indonesia) J Gozali
- (United States) C Pan
21
21
17

- (Indonesia) J Gozali
- (United States) C Pan

BYE

3
- (Australia) S Mapasa
- (Australia) G Somerville
16
17

- (Japan) M Matsumoto
- (Japan) W Nagahara
21
21

- (Canada) P Chan
- (Canada) T Yi

BYE

- (Canada) P Chan
- (Canada) T Yi
14
13

- (Japan) M Matsumoto
- (Japan) W Nagahara
21
21

- (Japan) M Matsumoto
- (Japan) W Nagahara

BYE

=== Bottom half ===
==== Section 3 ====
First round

Second round

Quarterfinals

- (Japan) Y Fukushima
- (Japan) C Shida
21
21

- (Canada) O Lei
- (Canada) M Tong
8
11

- (Japan) Y Fukushima
- (Japan) C Shida
21
21

- (Denmark) J Finne-Ipsen
- (Denmark) R S Hansen
14
16

BYE

- (Denmark) J Finne-Ipsen
- (Denmark) R S Hansen

- (Japan) Y Fukushima
- (Japan) C Shida
17
21
15

4
- (Japan) S Tanaka
- (Japan) K Yonemoto
21
13
21

BYE

- (United States) A Xu
- (United States) K Xu

- (United States) A Xu
- (United States) K Xu
11
15

4
- (Japan) S Tanaka
- (Japan) K Yonemoto
21
21

BYE

4
- (Japan) S Tanaka
- (Japan) K Yonemoto

==== Section 4 ====
First round

Second round

Quarterfinals

BYE

- (United States) A Lee
- (United States) S Lee

- (United States) A Lee
- (United States) S Lee
16
6

- (India) M Jakkampudi
- (India) S. P Ram
21
21

BYE

- (India) M Jakkampudi
- (India) S. P Ram

- (India) M Jakkampudi
- (India) S. P Ram
15
12

2
- (United States) E Lee
- (United States) P L Obanana
21
21

BYE

- (Australia) L Choo
- (Canada) R Honderich

- (Australia) L Choo
- (Canada) R Honderich
16
21

2
- (United States) E Lee
- (United States) P L Obanana
21
23

BYE

2
- (United States) E Lee
- (United States) P L Obanana

== Mixed doubles ==
=== Seeds ===
1. (England) Chris Adcock / Gabrielle Adcock (withdrew)
2. (Poland) Robert Mateusiak / Nadiezda Zieba (final)
3. (United States) Phillip Chew / Jamie Subandhi (quarterfinal)
4. (Australia) Robin Middleton / Leanne Choo (semifinal)

=== Finals ===
Semifinals

Final

- (Japan) Yugo Kobayashi
- (Japan) Wakana Nagahara
21
21

4
- (Australia) Robin Middleton
- (Australia) Leanne Choo
18
15

- (Japan) Yugo Kobayashi
- (Japan) Wakana Nagahara
21
21

2
- (Poland) Robert Mateusiak
- (Poland) Nadiezda Zieba
16
18

- (United States) Hock Lai Lee
- (Canada) Phyllis Chan
13
15

2
- (Poland) Robert Mateusiak
- (Poland) Nadiezda Zieba
21
21

=== Top half ===
==== Section 1 ====
First round

Second round

Quarterfinals

1
- (England) C Adcock
- (England) G Adcock

BYE

1
- (England) C Adcock
- (England) G Adcock

- (Canada) N Yakura
- (Canada) B Tam
w
/
o

- (Trinidad and Tobago) N Bonkowsky
- (United States) Y Cohn
5
7

- (Canada) N Yakura
- (Canada) B Tam
21
21

- (Canada) N Yakura
- (Canada) B Tam
17
21
20

- (Japan) Y Kobayashi
- (Japan) W Nagahara
21
19
22

- (Japan) Y Kobayashi
- (Japan) W Nagahara
21
21

- (Nepal) B Shrestha
- (Nepal) N Tamang
7
4

- (Japan) Y Kobayashi
- (Japan) W Nagahara
21
21

- (Canada) A Dong
- (Canada) Q Ouyang
18
17

- (India) M Attri
- (India) A Ponnappa

- (Canada) A Dong
- (Canada) Q Ouyang
w
/
o

==== Section 2 ====
First round

Second round

Quarterfinals

4
- (Australia) R Middleton
- (Australia) L Choo
21
21

- (United States) Y T Chan
- (United States) Y Kawasaki
6
9

4
- (Australia) R Middleton
- (Australia) L Choo
21
15
21

- (United States) T Gunawan
- (United States) J Hsu
18
21
6

- (Australia) M Chau
- (Australia) G Somerville
17
19

- (United States) T Gunawan
- (United States) J Hsu
21
21

4
- (Australia) R Middleton
- (Australia) L Choo
14
21
21

- (Republic of Ireland) S Magee
- (Republic of Ireland) C Magee
21
18
11

- (Vietnam) Do T C
- (Vietnam) Pham N T
21
21

- (United States) A Ahlawat
- (United States) J Y Hong
18
16

- (Vietnam) Do T C
- (Vietnam) Pham N T
18
21
17

- (Republic of Ireland) S Magee
- (Republic of Ireland) C Magee
21
18
21

- (Republic of Ireland) S Magee
- (Republic of Ireland) C Magee
21
18
21

- (South Korea) Yoo Y-s
- (United States) D Ng
7
21
11

=== Bottom half ===
==== Section 3 ====
First round

Second round

Quarterfinals

- (Canada) T Ng
- (Canada) R Honderich
21
21

- (Guatemala) S Jonathan
- (Guatemala) N A Sotomayor
5
16

- (Canada) T Ng
- (Canada) R Honderich
20
21
18

- (United States) H L Lee
- (Canada) P Chan
22
13
21

- (United States) H L Lee
- (Canada) P Chan
12
21
21

- (Canada) B. R. Sankeerth
- (Canada) C Rowe
21
16
12

- (United States) H L Lee
- (Canada) P Chan
21
21

3
- (United States) P Chew
- (United States) J Subandhi
18
16

- (Sweden) N Ruponen
- (Sweden) A Hogstrom
w
/
o

- (England) M Nottingham
- (England) E Westwood

- (Sweden) N Ruponen
- (Sweden) A Hogstrom
21
17
18

3
- (United States) P Chew
- (United States) J Subandhi
18
21
21

- (India) P J Chopra
- (India) N S Reddy

3
- (United States) P Chew
- (United States) J Subandhi
w
/
o

==== Section 4 ====
First round

Second round

Quarterfinals

- (Japan) Y Watanabe
- (Japan) A Higashino
21
21

- (Canada) A Liu
- (Canada) M Tong
15
13

- (Japan) Y Watanabe
- (Japan) A Higashino
12
21
15

- (Japan) R Taohata
- (Japan) K Yonemoto
21
13
21

- (Australia) S Serasinghe
- (Australia) S Mapasa
12
21
15

- (Japan) R Taohata
- (Japan) K Yonemoto
21
12
21

- (Japan) R Taohata
- (Japan) K Yonemoto
20
21
17

2
- (Poland) R Mateusiak
- (Poland) N Zieba
22
18
21

- (Vietnam) Duong B D
- (Vietnam) Vu T T
21
21

- (Austria) D Obernosterer
- (Austria) E Baldauf
19
11

- (Vietnam) Duong B D
- (Vietnam) Vu T T

2
- (Poland) R Mateusiak
- (Poland) N Zieba
w
/
o

BYE

2
- (Poland) R Mateusiak
- (Poland) N Zieba

Preceded by 2016 Chinese Taipei Open Grand Prix Gold; 2016 Canada Open Grand Prix	BWF Grand Prix and Grand Prix Gold; 2016 BWF season	Succeeded by 2016 Vietnam Open Grand Prix
