= 2016 Korea Masters Grand Prix Gold =

2016 Korea Master Grand Prix Gold
Tournament details
- Dates: 6 – 11 December 2016
- Level: Grand Prix Gold
- Total prize money: US$120,000
- Venue: Seogwipo Olympic Memorial Civic Center
- Location: Seogwipo, South Korea

Champions
- Men's singles: (South Korea) Son Wan-ho
- Women's singles: (South Korea) Sung Ji-hyun
- Men's doubles: (South Korea) Kim Jae-hwan (South Korea) Ko Sung-hyun
- Women's doubles: (South Korea) Jung Kyung-eun (South Korea) Shin Seung-chan
- Mixed doubles: (South Korea) Ko Sung-hyun (South Korea) Kim Ha-na

The 2016 Korea Masters Grand Prix Gold was the 21st Grand Prix badminton tournament of the 2016 BWF Grand Prix Gold and Grand Prix. The tournament was held at Seogwipo Olympic Memorial Civic Center in Seogwipo in South Korea 6–11 December 2016 and had a total purse of $120,000.

== Men's singles ==
=== Seeds ===
1. (South Korea) Son Wan-ho (champion)
2. (South Korea) Lee Hyun-il (second round)
3. (South Korea) Lee Dong-keun (quarterfinals)
4. (Chinese Taipei) Wang Tzu-wei (second round)
5. (Malaysia) Zulfadli Zulkiffli (withdrew)
6. (South Korea) Jeon Hyeok-jin (quarterfinals)
7. (Japan) Kanta Tsuneyama (withdrew)
8. (Thailand) Pannawit Thongnuam (second round)

=== Finals ===
Quarterfinals
1	(South Korea) Son Wan-ho	21	21
(Chinese Taipei) Hsueh Hsuan-yi	17	15
(India) Parupalli Kashyap	18	21	21
6	(South Korea) Jeon Hyeok-jin	21	8	16
(Malaysia) Liew Daren	21	21
3	(South Korea) Lee Dong-keun	19	16
(Chinese Taipei) Chen Chun-wei	12	21	21
(South Korea) Hwang Jong-soo	21	17	16

Semifinals
1	(South Korea) Son Wan-ho	23	21
(India) Parupalli Kashyap	21	16
(Malaysia) Liew Daren	21	21
(Chinese Taipei) Chen Chun-wei	13	7

Final
1	(South Korea) Son Wan-ho	21	21
(Malaysia) Liew Daren	13	16

=== Top half ===
==== Section 1 ====
First round
1	(South Korea) Son W-h
BYE
(Japan) Y Onodera	15	21	21
(South Korea) Park T-h	21	9	10
(United States) E Lee	4	3
(South Korea) Kim M-j	21	21
(South Korea) Kang J-w
(Chinese Taipei) Yang C-h	w	/	o

Second round
1	(South Korea) Son W-h	21	21
(Japan) Y Onodera	16	16
(South Korea) Kim M-j	21	21
(Chinese Taipei) Yang C-h	9	18

Third round
1	(South Korea) Son W-h	21	21
(South Korea) Kim M-j	11	11

==== Section 2 ====
First round
5	(Malaysia) Z Zulkiffli
(South Korea) Heo K-h	w	/	o
(South Korea) Choi J-h	17	10
(China) Guo K	21	21
(Chinese Taipei) Hsueh H-y	21	21
(South Korea) Noh J-h	18	12
(South Korea) Jung K-h	21	21
(Russia) D Grachev	14	13

Second round
(South Korea) Heo K-h	21	15	21
(China) Guo K	18	21	13
(Chinese Taipei) Hsueh H-y	25	21
(South Korea) Jung K-h	23	15

Third round
(South Korea) Heo K-h	17	22	19
(Chinese Taipei) Hsueh H-y	21	20	21

==== Section 3 ====
First round
4	(Chinese Taipei) Wang T-w	22	10	21
(South Korea) Park W-h	20	21	16
(India) P Kashyap	w	/	o
(South Korea) Kang M-w
(China) Zhou ZQ	21	21
(South Korea) Ha Y-w	13	13
(South Korea) Lee H-b	10	8
(China) Sun FX	21	21

Second round
4	(Chinese Taipei) Wang T-w	15	21	19
(India) P Kashayap	21	9	21
(China) Zhou ZQ	25	23	21
(China) Sun FX	23	25	19

Third round
(India) P Kashayap	21	13	21
(China) Zhou ZQ	11	21	8

==== Section 4 ====
First round
6	(South Korea) Jeon H-j	17	21	21
(South Korea) Yim J-w	21	19	15
(South Korea) Kim M-k	9	15
(China) Zhu SY	21	21
(South Korea) Park J-s	21	21
(England) H S Wong	13	14
(South Korea) Seo S-j	21	15	16
(Japan) H Shimono	19	21	21

Second round
6	(South Korea) Jeon H-j	13	21	21
(China) Zhu SY	21	14	19
(South Korea) Park J-s	9	14
(Japan) H Shimono	21	21

Third round
6	(South Korea) Jeon H-j	22	21
(Japan) H Shimono	20	16

=== Bottom half ===
==== Section 5 ====
First round
(Japan) K Watanabe	21	21
(South Korea) Han K-h	14	17
(South Korea) Woo S-h	15	22	14
(Malaysia) Liew D	21	20	21
(South Korea) Rho Y-w	5^{r}
(Japan) K Naraoka	9
(South Korea) Kim D-h	w	/	o
7	(Japan) K Tsuneyama

Second round
(Japan) K Watanabe	15	13
(Malaysia) Liew D	21	21
(Japan) K Naraoka	16	21	15
(South Korea) Kim D-h	21	13	21

Third round
(Malaysia) Liew D	21	19	21
(South Korea) Kim D-h	8	21	14

==== Section 6 ====
First round
(South Korea) Ko G-b	21	16	14
(Chinese Taipei) Shih K-c	11	21	21
(South Korea) Lee H-s	16	22	21
(Indonesia) Y F Mainaky	21	20	16
(Czech Republic) M Ludík	4
(South Korea) Kim I-w	0^{r}
(South Korea) Choi Y-w	8	16
3	(South Korea) Lee D-k	21	21

Second round
(Chinese Taipei) Shih K-c	21	21
(South Korea) Lee H-s	11	9
(Czech Republic) M Ludík	10	10
3	(South Korea) Lee D-k	21	21

Third round
(Chinese Taipei) Shih K-c	17	12
3	(South Korea) Lee D-k	21	21

==== Section 7 ====
First round
(China) Zhao JP	23	21
(South Korea) Jo G-y	21	13
(Chinese Taipei) Chu H-c	21	21
(South Korea) Nam S-h	16	19
(South Korea) Ha Y-s	11	13
(Chinese Taipei) Chen C-w	21	21
(South Korea) Kim J-h	7	14
8	(Thailand) P Thongnuam	21	21

Second round
(China) Zhao JP	22	21	18
(Chinese Taipei) Chu H-c	24	9	21
(Chinese Taipei) Chen C-w	22	11
8	(Thailand) P Thongnuam	20	4^{r}

Third round
(Chinese Taipei) Chu H-c	14	21	17
(Chinese Taipei) Chen C-w	21	15	21

==== Section 8 ====
First round
(Russia) S Sirant	20	10
(South Korea) Hwang J-s	22	21
(South Korea) Lee S-m	16	21	12
(Japan) Y Igarashi	21	18	21
(Chinese Taipei) Chang E-c	21	21
(South Korea) Seo M-s	14	14
BYE
2	(South Korea) Lee H-i

Second round
(South Korea) Hwang J-s	21	21
(Japan) Y Igarashi	14	13
(Chinese Taipei) Chang E-c	21	11
2	(South Korea) Lee H-i	15	4^{r}

Third round
(South Korea) Hwang J-s	21	21
(Chinese Taipei) Chang E-c	14	17

== Women's singles ==
=== Seeds ===
1. (South Korea) Sung Ji-hyun (champion)
2. (South Korea) Bae Yeon-ju (first round)
3. (Japan) Yui Hashimoto (second round)
4. (Japan) Ayumi Mine (quarterfinals)
5. (Japan) Aya Ohori (second round)
6. (Chinese Taipei) Hsu Ya-ching (first round)
7. (South Korea) Kim Hyo-min (second round)
8. (Chinese Taipei) Lee Chia-hsin (quarterfinals)

=== Finals ===
Semifinals
1	(South Korea) Sung Ji-hyun	21	21
(South Korea) Kim Ga-eun	13	8
(South Korea) Lee Jang-mi	21	21
(Japan) Natsuki Nidaira	14	16

Final
1	(South Korea) Sung Ji-hyun	21	21
(South Korea) Lee Jang-mi	8	10

=== Top half ===
==== Section 1 ====
First round
1	(South Korea) Sung J-h	21	21
(Japan) Y Nakai	11	15
(China) Zhang YM	21	15	12
(South Korea) Lee M-j	18	21	21
5	(Japan) A Ohori	21	23
Q1	(South Korea) Sim Y-j	17	21
(China) Chen XX	21	21
(Chinese Taipei) Yu C-h	12	10

Second round
1	(South Korea) Sung J-h	21	21
(South Korea) Lee M-j	15	11
5	(Japan) A Ohori	19	7
(China) Chen XX	21	21

Quarterfinals
1	(South Korea) Sung J-h	21	21
(China) Chen XX	12	15

==== Section 2 ====
First round
3	(Japan) Y Hashimoto	21	13	21
Q2	(South Korea) Kim Y-j	18	21	16
(South Korea) Kim G-e	21	21
(Chinese Taipei) Hu L-f	15	17
8	(Chinese Taipei) Lee C-h	21	18	21
(China) Cai YY	20	21	18
(Japan) A Takahashi	21	21
(Chinese Taipei) Hung S-h	10	17

Second round
3	(Japan) Y Hashimoto	21	16	12
(South Korea) Kim G-e	18	21	21
8	(Chinese Taipei) Lee C-h	21	21
(Japan) A Takahashi	18	19

Quarterfinals
(South Korea) Kim G-e	22	21
8	(Chinese Taipei) Lee C-h	20	18

=== Bottom half ===
==== Section 3 ====
First round
Q4	(South Korea) Ahn C-h	16	16
(Chinese Taipei) Chen S-y	21	21
(South Korea) Lee J-m	21	21
6	(Chinese Taipei) Hsu Y-c	13	16
(Japan) K Imabeppu	21	11	22
(South Korea) Kim N-y	18	21	20
(China) Han Y	21	16	20
4	(Japan) A Mine	19	21	22

Second round
(Chinese Taipei) Chen S-y	9	15
(South Korea) Lee J-m	21	21
(Japan) K Imabeppu	19	18
4	(Japan) A Mine	21	21

Quarterfinals
(South Korea) Lee J-m	21	21
4	(Japan) A Mine	13	5

==== Section 4 ====
First round
(Chinese Taipei) Chiang M-h	21	16	13
Q3	(South Korea) Jun J-i	18	21	21
(Japan) S Kawakami	21	21	14
7	(South Korea) Kim H-m	18	23	21
(Indonesia) L A Mainaky	21	18	16
(South Korea) Kim H-i	15	21	21
(Japan) N Nidaira	6
2	(South Korea) Bae Y-j	5^{r}

Second round
Q3	(South Korea) Jun J-i	21	21
7	(South Korea) Kim H-m	18	18
(South Korea) Kim H-i	17	0^{r}
(Japan) N Nidaira	21	0

Quarterfinals
Q3	(South Korea) Jun J-i	17	9
(Japan) N Nidaira	21	21

== Men's doubles ==
=== Seeds ===
1. (Chinese Taipei) Lee Jhe-huei / Lee Yang (final)
2. (Thailand) Kittinupong Kedren / Dechapol Puavaranukroh (second round)
3. (Singapore) Danny Bawa Chrisnanta / Hendra Wijaya (first round)
4. (Japan) Takuto Inoue / Yuki Kaneko (first round)
5. (China) Huang Kaixiang / Wang Yilu (withdrew)
6. (Chinese Taipei) Lu Ching-yao / Yang Po-han (semifinals)
7. (Japan) Hiroyuki Saeki / Ryota Taohata (quarterfinals)
8. (Chinese Taipei) Lin Chia-yu / Wang Chi-lin (quarterfinals)

=== Finals ===
Semifinals

Final

1
- (Chinese Taipei) Lee Jhe-huei
- (Chinese Taipei) Lee Yang
14
21
21

- (South Korea) Chung Eui-seok
- (South Korea) Kim Duk-young
21
10
17

1
- (Chinese Taipei) Lee Jhe-huei
- (Chinese Taipei) Lee Yang
19
18

- (South Korea) Kim Jae-hwan
- (South Korea) Ko Sung-hyun
21
21

6
- (Chinese Taipei) Lu Ching-yao
- (Chinese Taipei) Yang Po-han
16
16

- (South Korea) Kim Jae-hwan
- (South Korea) Ko Sung-hyun
21
21

=== Top half ===
==== Section 1 ====
First round

Second round

Quarterfinals

1
- (Chinese Taipei) Lee J-h
- (Chinese Taipei) Lee Y
21
16
21

- (South Korea) Bae K-y
- (South Korea) Kim D-e
17
21
12

1
- (Chinese Taipei) Lee J-h
- (Chinese Taipei) Lee Y
11
21
21

- (South Korea) Kim H-t
- (South Korea) Lim J-s
21
13
12

- (Russia) E Dremin
- (Russia) D Grachev
21
19
19

- (South Korea) Kim H-t
- (South Korea) Lim J-s
15
21
21

1
- (Chinese Taipei) Lee J-h
- (Chinese Taipei) Lee Y
21
21

7
- (Japan) H Saeki
- (Japan) R Taohata
14
10

7
- (Japan) H Saeki
- (Japan) R Taohata
21
21

Q2
- (South Korea) Kim M-j
- (South Korea) Lee S-m
14
13

7
- (Japan) H Saeki
- (Japan) R Taohata
21
21

- (Thailand) S Jomkoh
- (Thailand) P Kuna-Anuvit
14
16

- (Thailand) S Jomkoh
- (Thailand) P Kuna-Anuvit
21
18
21

- (South Korea) Jeon H-j
- (South Korea) Yun D-i
14
21
13

==== Section 2 ====
First round

Second round

Quarterfinals

3
- (Singapore) D B Chrisnanta
- (Singapore) H Wijaya
17
21
19

- (South Korea) Lee S-w
- (South Korea) Park K-h
21
14
21

- (South Korea) Lee S-w
- (South Korea) Park K-h
21
10
14

- (South Korea) Chung E-s
- (South Korea) Kim D-y
17
21
21

- (South Korea) Chung E-s
- (South Korea) Kim D-y
21
15
21

Q1
- (South Korea) Kang M-h
- (South Korea) Kim W-h
13
21
17

- (South Korea) Chung E-s
- (South Korea) Kim D-y
21
21

8
- (Chinese Taipei) Lin C-y
- (Chinese Taipei) Wang C-l
17
14

8
- (Chinese Taipei) Lin C-y
- (Chinese Taipei) Wang C-l
21
21

- (South Korea) Park S-w
- (South Korea) Seo G-m
7
11

8
- (Chinese Taipei) Lin C-y
- (Chinese Taipei) Wang C-l
21
21

- (China) He JT
- (China) Tan Q
16
14

- (China) He JT
- (China) Tan Q
21
21

Q3
- (South Korea) Ahn J-a
- (South Korea) Park M-s
14
7

=== Bottom half ===
==== Section 3 ====
First round

Second round

Quarterfinals

- (Japan) T Shimada
- (Japan) Y Takeuchi
21
21

PFQ
- (South Korea) Jun B-c
- (South Korea) Jung H-m
18
17

- (Japan) T Shimada
- (Japan) Y Takeuchi
18
13

6
- (Chinese Taipei) Lu C-y
- (Chinese Taipei) Yang P-h
21
21

- (South Korea) Jo C-w
- (South Korea) Kim S-h
12
6

6
- (Chinese Taipei) Lu C-y
- (Chinese Taipei) Yang P-h
21
21

6
- (Chinese Taipei) Lu C-y
- (Chinese Taipei) Yang P-h
22
21

- (South Korea) Kang J-w
- (South Korea) Lee S-j
20
17

(Chinese Taipei) Liu W-c
(Chinese Taipei) Tseng M-h
21
16
21

(Singapore) T Hee Y K
(Singapore) Loh K H
17
21
14

(Chinese Taipei) Liu W-c
(Chinese Taipei) Tseng M-h
13
15

- (South Korea) Kang J-w
- (South Korea) Lee S-j
21
21

- (South Korea) Kang J-w
- (South Korea) Lee S-j
10
21
21

4
- (Japan) T Inoue
- (Japan) Y Kaneko
21
18
14

==== Section 4 ====
First round

Second round

Quarterfinals

- (Chinese Taipei) Po L-w
- (Chinese Taipei) Yang M-t
16
12

- (Japan) K Mitsuhashi
- (Japan) Y Watanabe
21
21

- (Japan) K Mitsuhashi
- (Japan) Y Watanabe
11
21
21

PFQ
- (South Korea) Choi J-w
- (South Korea) Jang S-h
21
11
19

- (Chinese Taipei) Chang E-c
- (Chinese Taipei) Wu Y-c
9
15

PFQ
- (South Korea) Choi J-w
- (South Korea) Jang S-h
21
21

- (Japan) K Mitsuhashi
- (Japan) Y Watanabe
18
17

- (South Korea) Kim J-h
- (South Korea) Ko S-h
21
21

Q4
- (South Korea) Jin Y-h
- (South Korea) Kim Y-s
11
18

- (South Korea) Kim J-h
- (South Korea) Ko S-h
21
21

- (South Korea) Kim J-h
- (South Korea) Ko S-h
21
21

2
- (Thailand) K Kedren
- (Thailand) D Puavaranukroh
10
19

- (South Korea) Lee H-b
- (South Korea) Na S-s
15
10

2
- (Thailand) K Kedren
- (Thailand) D Puavaranukroh
21
21

== Women's doubles ==
=== Seeds ===
1. (South Korea) Jung Kyung-eun / Shin Seung-chan (champion)
2. (South Korea) Chang Ye-na / Lee So-hee (quarterfinals)
3. (Thailand) Puttita Supajirakul / Sapsiree Taerattanachai (first round)
4. (Japan) Yuki Fukushima / Sayaka Hirota (first round)
5. (China) Bao Yixin / Yu Xiaohan (withdrew)
6. (South Korea) Chae Yoo-jung / Kim So-yeong (final)
7. (South Korea) Kim Hye-rin / Yoo Hae-won (semifinals)
8. (Japan) Mayu Matsumoto / Wakana Nagahara (quarterfinals)

=== Finals ===
Semifinals

Final

1
- (South Korea) Jung Kyung-eun
- (South Korea) Shin Seung-chan
21
21

- (Japan) Ayako Sakuramoto
- (Japan) Yukiko Takahata
12
17

1
- (South Korea) Jung Kyung-eun
- (South Korea) Shin Seung-chan
21
21

6
- (South Korea) Chae Yoo-jung
- (South Korea) Kim So-yeong
14
14

7
- (South Korea) Kim Hye-rin
- (South Korea) Yoo Hae-won
16
15

6
- (South Korea) Chae Yoo-jung
- (South Korea) Kim So-yeong
21
21

=== Top half ===
==== Section 1 ====
First round

Second round

Quarterfinals

1
- (South Korea) Jung K-e
- (South Korea) Shin S-c
21
21

Q2
- (South Korea) Lee S-m
- (South Korea) Park S-r
19
11

1
- (South Korea) Jung K-e
- (South Korea) Shin S-c
21
21

Q4
- (Japan) N Matsuyama
- (Japan) C Shida
13
17

Q4
- (Japan) N Matsuyama
- (Japan) C Shida
21
22

- (Chinese Taipei) Chiang K-h
- (Chinese Taipei) Hung S-h
18
20

1
- (South Korea) Jung K-e
- (South Korea) Shin S-c
21
21

- (Japan) S Tanaka
- (Japan) K Yonemoto
13
15

PFQ
- (Chinese Taipei) Chang C-h
- (Chinese Taipei) Yu C-h
24
10
6

- (Japan) S Tanaka
- (Japan) K Yonemoto
22
21
21

- (Japan) S Tanaka
- (Japan) K Yonemoto
21
21

- (Thailand) N Saengchote
6
11

- (Thailand) N Saengchote
10
21
21

- (Japan) M Maeda
- (Japan) N Ono
21
16
17

==== Section 2 ====
First round

Second round

Quarterfinals

3
- (Thailand) P Supajirakul
17
21
15

- (Japan) A Sakuramoto
- (Japan) Y Takahata
21
12
21

- (Japan) A Sakuramoto
- (Japan) Y Takahata
18
21
21

- (South Korea) Park K-h
- (South Korea) Seong S-y
21
16
12

- (South Korea) Park K-h
- (South Korea) Seong S-y
21
15
22

- (Chinese Taipei) Lin X-m
- (Chinese Taipei) Wu F-c
16
21
20

- (Japan) A Sakuramoto
- (Japan) Y Takahata
22
21

8
- (Japan) M Matsumoto
- (Japan) W Nagahara
20
18

8
- (Japan) M Matsumoto
- (Japan) W Nagahara
21
21

- (South Korea) Hwang Y-m
- (South Korea) Kang C-h
17
17

8
- (Japan) M Matsumoto
- (Japan) W Nagahara
21
21

Q3
- (South Korea) Baek H-n
- (South Korea) Song H-j
15
13

- (South Korea) Kim M-j
- (South Korea) Kim S-e
12
10

Q3
- (South Korea) Baek H-n
- (South Korea) Song H-j
21
21

=== Bottom half ===
==== Section 3 ====
First round

Second round

Quarterfinals

- (Chinese Taipei) Chen H-h
- (Chinese Taipei) Liang T-y
9
17

- (China) Du Y
- (China) Xu Y
21
21

- (China) Du Y
- (China) Xu Y
12
21
8

7
- (South Korea) Kim H-r
- (South Korea) Yoo H-w
21
19
21

Q1
- (South Korea) Kim Y-r
- (South Korea) Lee Y-r
10
10

7
- (South Korea) Kim H-r
- (South Korea) Yoo H-w
21
21

7
- (South Korea) Kim H-r
- (South Korea) Yoo H-w
21
21

- (South Korea) Go A-r
- (South Korea) Kong H-y
19
7

- (Thailand) N Chatupornkarnchana
17
13

- (Chinese Taipei) Cheng Y-c
- (Chinese Taipei) Hu L-f
21
21

- (Chinese Taipei) Cheng Y-c
- (Chinese Taipei) Hu L-f
11
14

- (South Korea) Go A-r
- (South Korea) Kong H-y
21
21

- (South Korea) Go A-r
- (South Korea) Kong H-y
11
21
21

4
- (Japan) Y Fukushima
- (Japan) S Hirota
21
19
19

==== Section 4 ====
First round

Second round

Quarterfinals

- (South Korea) Kim C-m
- (South Korea) Kim H-j
21
21

- (Thailand) C Chaladchalam
- (Thailand) P Muenwong
15
10

- (South Korea) Kim C-m
- (South Korea) Kim H-j
18
19

6
- (South Korea) Chae Y-j
- (South Korea) Kim S-y
21
21

- (Chinese Taipei) Chen S-y
- (Chinese Taipei) Kuo Y-w
15
8

6
- (South Korea) Chae Y-j
- (South Korea) Kim S-y
21
21

6
- (South Korea) Chae Y-j
- (South Korea) Kim S-y
20
21
24

2
- (South Korea) Chang Y-n
- (South Korea) Lee S-h
22
13
22

- (South Korea) Eom H-w
- (South Korea) Kim M-k
22
21
21

- (Chinese Taipei) Hsu Y-c
- (Chinese Taipei) Wu T-j
24
17
16

- (South Korea) Eom H-w
- (South Korea) Kim M-k
17
15

2
- (South Korea) Chang Y-n
- (South Korea) Lee S-h
21
21

- (Japan) M Kashihara
- (Japan) M Kato
17
21
10

2
- (South Korea) Chang Y-n
- (South Korea) Lee S-h
21
19
21

== Mixed doubles ==
=== Seeds ===
1. (South Korea) Ko Sung-hyun / Kim Ha-na (champion)
2. (Thailand) Dechapol Puavaranukroh / Sapsiree Taerattanachai (final)
3. (Singapore) Terry Hee Yong Kai / Tan Wei Han (semifinals)
4. (Russia) Evgenij Dremin / Evgenia Dimova (first round)
5. (Japan) Yuta Watanabe / Arisa Higashino (second round)
6. (China) Wang Yilu / Du Yue (withdrew)
7. (Chinese Taipei) Lee Jhe-huei / Wu Ti-jung (first round)
8. (China) He Jiting / Xu Ya (quarterfinals)

=== Finals ===
Semifinals
1	(South Korea) Ko Sung-hyun (South Korea) Kim Ha-na	21	17	21
3	(Singapore) Terry Hee Yong Kai (Singapore) Tan Wei Han	14	21	7
(South Korea) Choi Sol-gyu (South Korea) Chae Yoo-jung	14	14
2	(Thailand) Dechapol Puavaranukroh (Thailand) Sapsiree Taerattanachai	21	21

Final
1	(South Korea) Ko Sung-hyun (South Korea) Kim Ha-na	21	21
2	(Thailand) Dechapol Puavaranukroh (Thailand) Sapsiree Taerattanachai	19	16

=== Top half ===
==== Section 1 ====
First round

Second round

Quarterfinals

1
- (South Korea) Ko S-h
- (South Korea) Kim H-n
21
22

- (Chinese Taipei) Lee Y
- (Chinese Taipei) Kuo Y-w
13
20

1
- (South Korea) Ko S-h
- (South Korea) Kim H-n
21
19
21

- (South Korea) Kim J-h
- (South Korea) Kim S-y
9
21
16

(Indonesia) Y F Mainaky
(Indonesia) L A Mainaky
9
11

- (South Korea) Kim J-h
- (South Korea) Kim S-y
21
21

1
- (South Korea) Ko S-h
- (South Korea) Kim H-n
15
21
21

- (South Korea) Kang J-y
- (South Korea) Eom H-w
21
19
18

5
- (Japan) Y Watanabe
- (Japan) A Higashino
21
21

- (South Korea) Bae K-y
- (South Korea) Kong H-y
12
10

5
- (Japan) Y Watanabe
- (Japan) A Higashino
17
17

- (South Korea) Kang J-y
- (South Korea) Eom H-w
21
21

- (South Korea) Kang J-y
- (South Korea) Eom H-w
21
21

- (Chinese Taipei) Liu W-c
- (Chinese Taipei) Chen H-h
11
17

==== Section 2 ====
First round

Second round

Quarterfinals

3
(Singapore) Terry Hee Y K
(Singapore) Tan W H
20
21
21

(Thailand) S Jomkoh
(Thailand) P Supajirakul
22
19
8

3
- (Singapore) Terry Hee Y K
21
24

- (Chinese Taipei) Lu C-y
- (Chinese Taipei) Chiang K-h
15
22

Q2
- (Japan) K Mitsuhashi
- (Japan) M Kato
17
21
12

- (Chinese Taipei) Lu C-y
- (Chinese Taipei) Chiang K-h
21
18
21

3
- (Singapore) Terry Hee Y K
21
21

8
- (China) He JT
- (China) Xu Y
15
16

8
- (China) He JT
- (China) Xu Y
21
21

- (Chinese Taipei) Chen C-w
- (Chinese Taipei) Chen S-y
11
6

8
- (China) He JT
- (China) Xu Y
13
21
21

- (Chinese Taipei) Lin c-y
- (Chinese Taipei) Hsu Y-c
21
14
6

- (Chinese Taipei) Lin c-y
- (Chinese Taipei) Hsu Y-c
21
21

(Thailand) P Thongnuam
(Thailand) N Saengchote
11
10

=== Bottom half ===
==== Section 3 ====
First round

Second round

Quarterfinals

Q1
- (South Korea) Han T-s
- (South Korea) Han G-h
16
19

- (South Korea) Chung E-s
- (South Korea) Yoo H-w
21
21

- (South Korea) Chung E-s
- (South Korea) Yoo H-w
21
21

- (Japan) T Takashina
- (Japan) R Etoh
13
12

- (Japan) T Takashina
- (Japan) R Etoh
21
21

7
- (Chinese Taipei) Lee J-h
- (Chinese Taipei) Wu T-j
18
11

- (South Korea) Chung E-s
- (South Korea) Yoo H-w
17
18

- (South Korea) Choi S-g
- (South Korea) Chae Y-j
21
21

- (South Korea) Choi S-g
- (South Korea) Chae Y-j
21
17
21

- (Japan) R Taohata
- (Japan) K Yonemoto
16
21
12

- (South Korea) Choi S-g
- (South Korea) Chae Y-j
21
23

Q3
- (South Korea) Lee S-j
- (South Korea) Kim H-j
12
21

Q3
- (South Korea) Lee S-j
- (South Korea) Kim H-j
21
10
14

4
- (Russia) E Dremin
- (Russia) E Dimova
13
21
21

==== Section 4 ====
First round

Second round

Quarterfinals

- (South Korea) Kim D-e
- (South Korea) Go A-r
21
21

- (Chinese Taipei) Wu Y-c
- (Chinese Taipei) Peng L-t
18
12

- (South Korea) Kim D-e
- (South Korea) Go A-r
21
18
21

PFQ
- (Chinese Taipei) Tseng M-h
- (Chinese Taipei) Hu L-f
12
21
8

- (Japan) Y Kaneko
- (Japan) M Matsumoto
21
16

PFQ
- (Chinese Taipei) Tseng M-h
- (Chinese Taipei) Hu L-f
23
21

- (South Korea) Kim D-e
- (South Korea) Go A-r
10
21
14

2
- (Thailand) D Puavaranukroh
21
15
21

Q4
- (South Korea) Kim W-h
- (South Korea) Lee Y-r
21
21

- (South Korea) Kim D-y
- (South Korea) Kim H-r
18
19

Q4
- (South Korea) Kim W-h
- (South Korea) Lee Y-r
21
17

2
- (Thailand) D Puavaranukroh
23
21

- (Chinese Taipei) Yang M-t
- (Chinese Taipei) Yu C-h
13
12

2
- (Thailand) D Puavaranukroh
21
21

Preceded by 2016 Macau Open Grand Prix Gold	BWF Grand Prix and Grand Prix Gold; 2016 BWF Season	Succeeded by 2017 Malaysia Masters Grand Prix Gold
