= Eva Lee (badminton) =

American badminton player

Eva Lee 李意恒
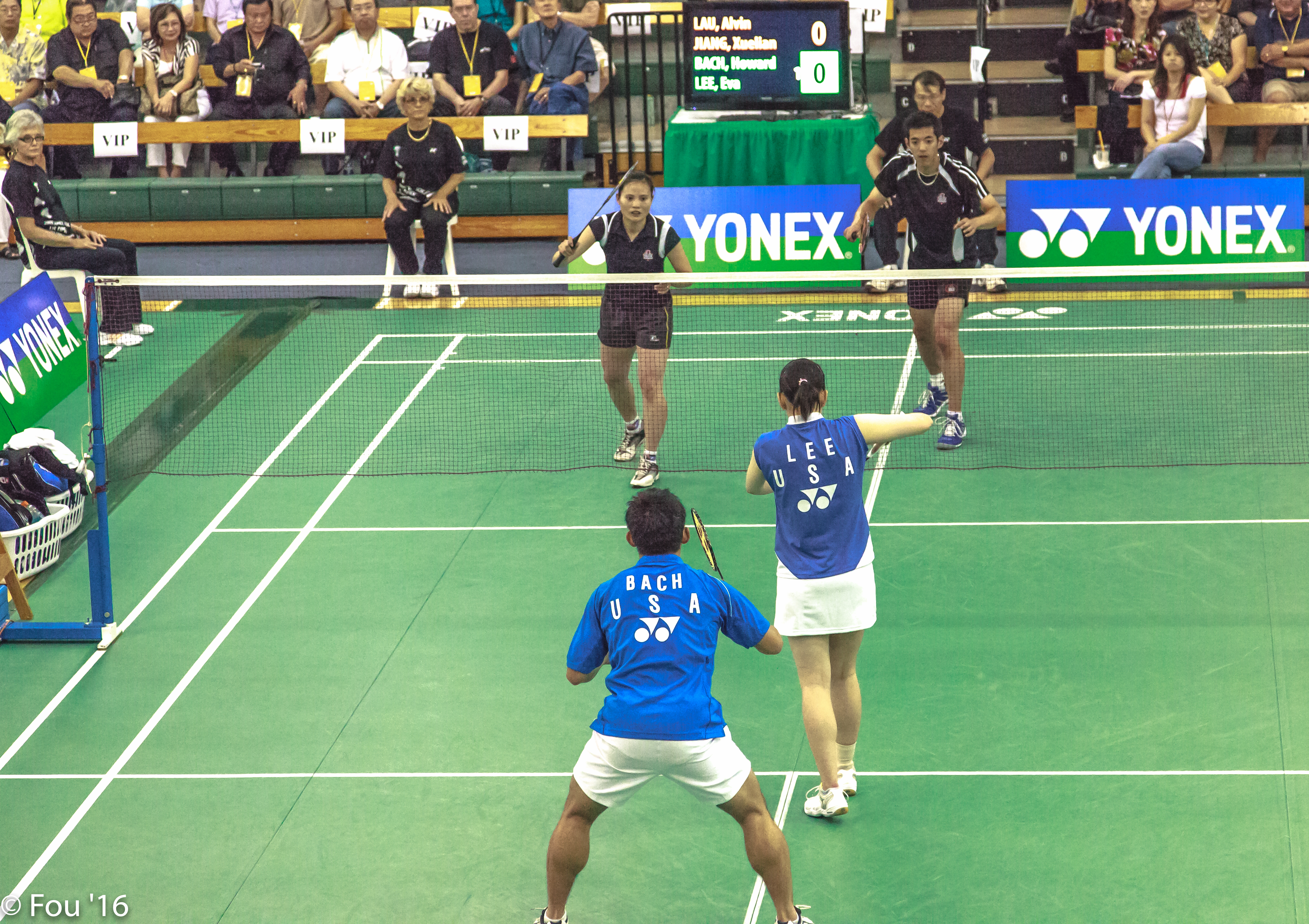

Personal information
- Born: August 7, 1986 (age 40) British Hong Kong
- Height: 1.67 m (5 ft 6 in)
- Weight: 58 kg (128 lb)

Sport
- Country: United States
- Sport: Badminton
- Handedness: Right
- Coached by: Johanna Lee

Women's & mixed doubles
- Highest ranking: 61 (WS October 22, 2008); 17 (WD April 2, 2015); 21 (XD March 12, 2008)
- BWF profile
Medal record
Women's badminton
Representing United States
Pan American Games
| Gold medal – first place | 2007 Rio de Janeiro | Women's singles |
| Gold medal – first place | 2007 Rio de Janeiro | Women's doubles |
| Gold medal – first place | 2007 Rio de Janeiro | Mixed doubles |
| Gold medal – first place | 2015 Toronto | Women's doubles |
| Silver medal – second place | 2011 Guadalajara | Mixed doubles |
| Bronze medal – third place | 2011 Guadalajara | Women's doubles |
Pan Am Championships
| Gold medal – first place | 2007 Calgary | Mixed doubles |
| Gold medal – first place | 2013 Santo Domingo | Women's doubles |
| Gold medal – first place | 2014 Markham | Women's doubles |
| Silver medal – second place | 2007 Calgary | Women's doubles |
| Silver medal – second place | 2007 Calgary | Mixed team |
| Silver medal – second place | 2013 Santo Domingo | Mixed doubles |
| Silver medal – second place | 2013 Santo Domingo | Mixed team |
| Silver medal – second place | 2014 Markham | Mixed team |
Pan Am Junior Championships
| Gold medal – first place | 2004 Lima | Mixed team |
| Gold medal – first place | 2002 California | Girls' doubles |
| Gold medal – first place | 2002 California | Mixed doubles |
| Silver medal – second place | 2002 California | Girls' singles |

Eva Lee (Chinese: 李意恒, born August 7, 1986) is an American badminton player.

Eva Lee at the U.S. Open International Badminton tournament in 2009 with her partner Howard Bach.

== Early life ==
Lee was born in Hong Kong and moved to the United States as a child. She was raised in Diamond Bar, California.

== Career ==
1997

She started to play badminton and trained with her first coach Peter Baum (former US National Team member).

1998

She took her first three crown titles in US Junior National Championships.

1999

She captured her first crown title in Canadian Junior Open (under 17 Singles).

2005 World Championships

She played at the 2005 World Badminton Championships in Anaheim and lost in the first round.

2006 Intercollegiate Championships

She was both singles and doubles champion at the California Community College Athletic Association State Championships.

2006 Canadian International

In 2006 Eva Lee grabbed three titles at the Canadian Open.

2006 Boston Badminton Open

At the Boston Badminton Open she won the doubles title together with Mesinee Mangkalakiri.

2007 Pan American Games

Lee also competed in badminton at the 2007 Pan American Games in Rio de Janeiro. She won three gold medals, one in women's singles, one in women's doubles with Mesinee Mangkalakiri, and another in mixed doubles with Howard Bach.

2008 Beijing Olympics

Lee lost in the first round to Canadian Anna Rice. While losing the first game, she made a quick comeback in the second and won. In the third, she maintained lead until halfway through where Anna Rice took command and finished through.

== Achievements ==
=== Pan American Games ===
Women's singles
| Year | Venue | Opponent | Score | Result |
|---|---|---|---|---|
| 2007 | Riocentro Sports Complex Pavilion 4B; Rio de Janeiro, Brazil | (Canada) Charmaine Reid | 21–14, 21–18 | Gold |

Women's doubles
| Year | Venue | Partner | Opponent | Score | Result |
|---|---|---|---|---|---|
| 2007 | Riocentro Sports Complex Pavilion 4B; Rio de Janeiro, Brazil | (United States) Mesinee Mangkalakiri | (Canada) Charmaine Reid (Canada) Fiona McKee | 21–14, 21–15 | Gold |
| 2011 | Multipurpose Gymnasium; Guadalajara, Mexico | (United States) Paula Lynn Obañana | (Canada) Alex Bruce (Canada) Michelle Li | 21–12, 16–21, 19–21 | Bronze |
| 2015 | Atos Markham Pan Am Centre; Toronto, Canada | (United States) Paula Lynn Obañana | (Brazil) Lohaynny Vicente (Brazil) Luana Vicente | 21–14, 21–6 | Gold |

Mixed doubles
| Year | Venue | Partner | Opponent | Score | Result |
|---|---|---|---|---|---|
| 2007 | Riocentro Sports Complex Pavilion 4B; Rio de Janeiro, Brazil | (United States) Howard Bach | (Canada) Mike Beres (Canada) Valerie Loker | 21–19, 21–16 | Gold |
| 2011 | Multipurpose Gymnasium; Guadalajara, Mexico | (United States) Halim Haryanto | (Canada) Toby Ng (Canada) Grace Gao | 13–21, 21–9, 17–21 | Silver |

=== Pan Am Championships ===
Women's doubles
| Year | Venue | Partner | Opponent | Score | Result |
|---|---|---|---|---|---|
| 2007 | Calgary Winter Club; Calgary, Canada | (United States) Mesinee Mangkalakiri | (Canada) Fiona McKee (Canada) Charmaine Reid | 20–22, 21–17, 18–21 | Silver |
| 2013 | Palacio de los Deportes Virgilio Travieso Soto; Santo Domingo, Dominican Republic | (United States) Paula Lynn Obañana | (Canada) Alex Bruce (Canada) Phyllis Chan | 21–15, 21–13 | Gold |
| 2014 | Markham Pan Am Centre; Markham, Canada | (United States) Paula Lynn Obañana | (Brazil) Lohaynny Vicente (Brazil) Luana Vicente | 23–21, 21–14 | Gold |

Mixed doubles
| Year | Venue | Partner | Opponent | Score | Result |
|---|---|---|---|---|---|
| 2007 | Calgary Winter Club; Calgary, Canada | (United States) Howard Bach | (Canada) Mike Beres (Canada) Valerie Loker | 21–18, 21–17 | Gold |
| 2013 | Palacio de los Deportes Virgilio Travieso Soto; Santo Domingo, Dominican Republic | (United States) Howard Shu | (Canada) Toby Ng (Canada) Alex Bruce | 12–21, 21–23 | Silver |

=== BWF Grand Prix ===
The BWF Grand Prix had two levels, the Grand Prix and Grand Prix Gold. It was a series of badminton tournaments sanctioned by the Badminton World Federation (BWF) and played between 2007 and 2017.

Women's doubles
| Year | Tournament | Partner | Opponent | Score | Result |
|---|---|---|---|---|---|
| 2014 | U.S. Grand Prix | (United States) Paula Lynn Obañana | (Chinese Taipei) Hsieh Pei-chen (Chinese Taipei) Wu Ti-jung | 16–21, 10–21 | (silver) Runner-up |

Mixed doubles
| Year | Tournament | Partner | Opponent | Score | Result |
|---|---|---|---|---|---|
| 2009 | U.S. Open | (United States) Howard Bach | (Canada) Alvin Lau (Canada) Jiang Xuelian | 21–13, 21–12 | (gold) Winner |
| 2014 | U.S. Grand Prix | (United States) Howard Shu | (Germany) Peter Käsbauer (Germany) Isabel Herttrich | 12–21, 14–21 | (silver) Runner-up |

BWF Grand Prix Gold tournament
BWF Grand Prix tournament

=== BWF International Challenge/Series ===
Women's singles
| Year | Tournament | Opponent | Score | Result |
|---|---|---|---|---|
| 2006 | Canadian International | (Canada) Denyse Julien | 21–12, 21–12 | (gold) Winner |

Women's doubles
| Year | Tournament | Partner | Opponent | Score | Result |
|---|---|---|---|---|---|
| 2006 | Canadian International | (United States) Mesinee Mangkalakiri | (Germany) Caren Hueckstaedt (Switzerland) Razi Huwaina | 21–13, 21–14 | (gold) Winner |
| 2007 | Irish International | (United States) Mesinee Mangkalakiri | (Republic of Ireland) Huang Bing (Republic of Ireland) Chloe Magee | 15–21, 21–9, 11–21 | (silver) Runner-up |
| 2008 | Banuinvest International | (United States) Mesinee Mangkalakiri | (Russia) Olga Golovanova (Russia) Anastasia Prokopenko | 18–21, 15–21 | (silver) Runner-up |
| 2010 | Brazil International | (United States) Paula Lynn Obañana | (United States) Iris Wang (United States) Rena Wang | 14–21, 21–11, 21–12 | (gold) Winner |
| 2011 | Guatemala International | (United States) Paula Lynn Obañana | (Canada) Grace Gao (Canada) Joycelyn Ko | 19–21, 21–18, 21–13 | (gold) Winner |
| 2011 | Brazil International | (United States) Paula Lynn Obañana | (Canada) Alex Bruce (Canada) Michelle Li | 21–14, 21–17 | (gold) Winner |
| 2011 | Norwegian International | (United States) Paula Lynn Obañana | (Netherlands) Lotte Jonathans (Netherlands) Paulien van Dooremalen | 17–21, 21–6, 21–13 | (gold) Winner |
| 2012 | Swedish Masters | (United States) Paula Lynn Obañana | (England) Mariana Agathangelou (England) Heather Olver | 15–21, 12–21 | (silver) Runner-up |
| 2012 | Austrian International | (United States) Paula Lynn Obañana | (Malaysia) Ng Hui Ern (Malaysia) Ng Hui Lin | 16–21, 18–21 | (silver) Runner-up |
| 2012 | Polish Open | (United States) Paula Lynn Obañana | (England) Mariana Agathangelou (England) Heather Olver | 12–21, 21–23 | (silver) Runner-up |
| 2012 | Tahiti International | (United States) Paula Lynn Obañana | (Canada) Alex Bruce (Canada) Michelle Li | 21–13, 21–12 | (gold) Winner |
| 2013 | Canadian International | (United States) Paula Lynn Obañana | (Canada) Alex Bruce (Canada) Phyllis Chan | 15–21, 14–21 | (gold) Winner |
| 2013 | Bulgarian International | (United States) Paula Lynn Obañana | (Bulgaria) Gabriela Stoeva (Bulgaria) Stefani Stoeva | 15–21, 10–21 | (silver) Runner-up |
| 2014 | Peru International | (United States) Paula Lynn Obañana | (Canada) Nicole Grether (Canada) Charmaine Reid | 21–14, 21–15 | (gold) Winner |
| 2014 | Guatemala International | (United States) Paula Lynn Obañana | (Brazil) Paula Pereira (Brazil) Fabiana Silva | 11–3, 11–3, 11–10 | (gold) Winner |
| 2014 | USA International | (United States) Paula Lynn Obañana | (Japan) Naoko Fukuman (Japan) Kurumi Yonao | 10–21, 23–25 | (silver) Runner-up |
| 2015 | Guatemala International | (United States) Paula Lynn Obañana | (Germany) Johanna Goliszewski (Germany) Carla Nelte | 18–21, 22–24 | (silver) Runner-up |
| 2015 | Bulgarian International | (United States) Paula Lynn Obañana | (Bulgaria) Gabriela Stoeva (Bulgaria) Stefani Stoeva | 14–21, 10–21 | (silver) Runner-up |
| 2015 | Chile International Challenge | (United States) Paula Lynn Obañana | (Brazil) Lohaynny Vicente (Brazil) Luana Vicente | 21–17, 21–16 | (gold) Winner |
| 2016 | Austrian Open | (United States) Paula Lynn Obañana | (Russia) Ekaterina Bolotova (Russia) Evgeniya Kosetskaya | 11–21, 21–23 | (silver) Runner-up |
| 2016 | Tahiti International | (United States) Paula Lynn Obañana | (Japan) Akane Araki (Japan) Ayaka Kawasaki | 13–21, 12–21 | (silver) Runner-up |
| 2016 | Yonex / K&D Graphics International | (United States) Paula Lynn Obañana | (United States) Jing Yu Hong (United States) Beiwen Zhang | 17–21, 20–22 | (silver) Runner-up |

Mixed doubles
| Year | Tournament | Partner | Opponent | Score | Result |
|---|---|---|---|---|---|
| 2006 | Canadian International | (United States) Howard Bach | (Canada) William Milroy (Canada) Tammy Sun | 21–19, 21–15 | (gold) Winner |
| 2007 | Miami Pan Am International | (United States) Howard Bach | (Canada) Mike Beres (Canada) Valerie Loker | 21–17, 23–21, 20–22 | (silver) Runner-up |
| 2007 | Irish International | (United States) Howard Bach | (Belgium) Wouter Claes (Belgium) Nathalie Descamps | 21–10, 21–13 | (gold) Winner |
| 2010 | Brazil International | (United States) Halim Haryanto | (United States) Hock Lai Lee (United States) Priscilla Lun | 21–11, 22–20 | (gold) Winner |
| 2011 | Peru International | (United States) Halim Haryanto | (Canada) Toby Ng (Canada) Grace Gao | 11–21, 21–14, 15–21 | (silver) Runner-up |
| 2011 | Brazil International | (United States) Halim Haryanto | (Australia) Glenn Warfe (Australia) Leanne Choo | 21–11, 21–15 | (gold) Winner |
| 2013 | Italian International | (Croatia) Zvonimir Đurkinjak | (Netherlands) Jacco Arends (Netherlands) Selena Piek | 23–21, 21–18 | (gold) Winner |
| 2014 | Peru International | (United States) Christian Yahya Christianto | (Canada) Derrick Ng (Canada) Michelle Li | 21–16, 21–18 | (gold) Winner |
| 2014 | Guatemala International | (United States) Howard Shu | (United States) Phillip Chew (United States) Jamie Subandhi | 10–11, 11–5, 11–10, 8–11, 11–5 | (gold) Winner |

BWF International Challenge tournament
BWF International Series tournament
BWF Future Series tournament
