= 2014 U.S. Open Grand Prix =

Tournament details
- Dates: December 8, 2014 - December 13, 2014
- Total prize money: US$50,000
- Venue: Orange County Badminton Club
- Location: Orange, United States

The 2014 U.S. Open Grand Prix was the seventh grand prix gold and grand prix tournament of the 2014 BWF Grand Prix Gold and Grand Prix. The tournament was held in Orange County Badminton Club, Orange, United States December 8 until December 13, 2014 and had a total purse of $50,000.

== Players by nation ==
| Nation | First round | Second round | Third round | Quarterfinals | Semifinals | Final |
|---|---|---|---|---|---|---|
| (United States) | 12 | 13 | | 3 | 2 | 2 |
| (Canada) | 6 | 9 | 2 | 2 | 3 | 1 |
| (Brazil) | 3 | 6 | | 2 | | |
| (Guatemala) | 3 | 4 | 1 | | | |
| (Peru) | 3 | 2 | | 2 | | |
| (Austria) | 2 | 1 | | 1 | | |
| (Indonesia) | 2 | | | | | |
| (Chinese Taipei) | 1 | | 1 | 2 | 1 | |
| (Scotland) | 1 | 1 | | | | |
| (Australia) | 1 | | | 1 | | |
| (Bangladesh) | 1 | | | | | |
| (Netherlands) | | 1 | | | | |
| (Belgium) | | | 1 | | | |
| (Slovakia) | | | 1 | | | |
| (Norway) | | | 1 | | | |
| (Vietnam) | | | 1 | | | |
| (Malaysia) | | 1 | | 2 | | |
| (Germany) | | 1 | | 1 | 1 | |
| (Thailand) | | | | 1 | 1 | |
| (Czech Republic) | | | | | 1 | 1 |
| (Israel) | | | | | 1 | |
| (Japan) | | | | | | 1 |

== Men's singles ==
=== Seeds ===
1. (Chinese Taipei) Hsu Jen-hao (champion)
2. (Israel) Misha Zilberman (semi-final)
3. (United States) Howard Shu (second round)
4. (Malaysia) Zulfadli Zulkiffli (quarter-final)
5. (Guatemala) Kevin Cordon (second round)
6. (Brazil) Daniel Paiola (second round)
7. (United States) Sattawat Pongnairat (second round)
8. (Czech Republic) Petr Koukal (final)

=== Finals ===
Quarterfinals
1 | (Chinese Taipei) Hsu Jen-hao | 22 | 21
(England) Andrew Smith | 20 | 19
4 | (Malaysia) Zulfadli Zulkiffli | 21 | 15 | 16
(Thailand) Sitthikom Thammasin | 16 | 21 | 21
8 | (Czech Republic) Petr Koukal | 17 | 21 | 21
(Chinese Taipei) Kuo Ching-hung | 21 | 18 | 17
(Austria) David Obernosterer | 12 | 21 | 19
2 | (Israel) Misha Zilberman | 21 | 11 | 21

Semifinals
1 | (Chinese Taipei) Hsu Jen-hao | 21 | 17 | 21
(Thailand) Sitthikom Thammasin | 14 | 21 | 19
8 | (Czech Republic) Petr Koukal | 21 | 21
2 | (Israel) Misha Zilberman | 15 | 18

Final
1 | (Chinese Taipei) Hsu Jen-hao | 21 | 19 | 21
8 | (Czech Republic) Petr Koukal | 19 | 21 | 8

=== Top half ===
==== Section 1 ====
First Round
1 | (Chinese Taipei) Hsu J-h
BYE
(Peru) A Corpancho
BYE
(Guatemala) A Marroquin
BYE
(Canada) B.R. Sankeerth | 21 | 21
(United States) C Lin | 14 | 12

Second Round
1 | (Chinese Taipei) Hsu J-h | 21 | 21
(Peru) A Corpancho | 10 | 15
(Guatemala) A Marroquin | 18 | 13
(Canada) B.R. Sankeerth | 21 | 21

Third Round
1 | (Chinese Taipei) Hsu J-h | 21 | 21
(Canada) B.R. Sankeerth | 5 | 11

==== Section 2 ====
First Round
7 | (United States) S Pongnairat
BYE
(England) A Smith | 21 | 21
(Canada) H Wiebe | 12 | 14
(Canada) A Droler
BYE
(Canada) L Couture | 21 | 21
(United States) MY Ong | 13 | 15

Second Round
7 | (United States) S Pongnairat | 19 | 16
(England) A Smith | 21 | 21
(Canada) A Droler | 13 | 15
(Canada) L Couture | 21 | 21

Third Round
(England) A Smith | 21 | 21
(Canada) L Couture | 13 | 10

==== Section 3 ====
First Round
4 | (Malaysia) Zf Zulkiffli
BYE
(Brazil) L Santos Jr | 21 | 21
(Canada) P Pilote | 9 | 15
(Guatemala) H Heymard
BYE
(Guatemala) R Ramirez | 21 | 21
(United States) X Zeng | 14 | 14

Second Round
4 | (Malaysia) Zf Zulkiffli | 21 | 21
(Brazil) L Santos Jr | 7 | 10
(Guatemala) H Heymard | 17 | 21 | 17
(Guatemala) R Ramirez | 21 | 19 | 21

Third Round
4 | (Malaysia) Zf Zulkiffli | 21 | 21
(Guatemala) R Ramirez | 5 | 17

==== Section 4 ====
First Round
6 | (Brazil) D Paiola
BYE
(Belgium) Y Tan | 21 | 21
(Canada) M Tétreault | 14 | 16
(Thailand) S Thammasin
BYE
(Bangladesh) P A Habib | w/o
(United States) HL Lee

Second Round
6 | (Brazil) D Paiola | 5 | 14
(Belgium) Y Tan | 21 | 21
(Thailand) S Thammasin | 21 | 21
(United States) HL Lee | 19 | 10

Third Round
(Belgium) Y Tan | 15 | 18
(Thailand) S Thammasin | 21 | 21

=== Bottom half ===
==== Section 5 ====
First Round
(Norway) M Myhre | 21 | 21
(Indonesia) D Pandu | 15 | 16
BYE
(Netherlands) N Fransman
(Guatemala) D Humblers | 11 | 7
(Brazil) A Tjong | 21 | 21
BYE
8 | (Czech Republic) P Koukal

Second Round
(Norway) M Myhre | 21 | 21
(Netherlands) N Fransman | 19 | 11
(Brazil) A Tjong | 10 | 12
8 | (Czech Republic) P Koukal | 21 | 21

Third Round
(Norway) M Myhre | 10 | 21 | 15
8 | (Czech Republic) P Koukal | 21 | 16 | 21

==== Section 6 ====
First Round
(Canada) F Beaucage | 21 | 21
(United States) R Chew | 18 | 13
BYE
(Chinese Taipei) Kuo C-h
(Denmark) R Holmgaaed | 17 | 21 | 15
(Slovakia) J Vicen | 21 | 17 | 21
BYE
3 | (United States) H Shu

Second Round
(Canada) F Beaucage | 3 | 11
(Chinese Taipei) Kuo C-h | 21 | 21
(Slovakia) J Vicen | 11 | 22 | 21
3 | (United States) H Shu | 21 | 20 | 18

Third Round
(Chinese Taipei) Kuo C-h | 21 | 21
(Slovakia) J Vicen | 12 | 15

==== Section 7 ====
First Round
(Canada) T Chiu | 15 | 19
(United States) T Lam | 21 | 21
BYE
(Chinese Taipei) Lo C-y
(Canada) M Giuffre | 16 | 21 | 7
(Austria) D Obernosterer | 21 | 16 | 21
BYE
5 | (Guatemala) K Cordon

Second Round
(United States) T Lam | 13 | 21 | 14
(Chinese Taipei) Lo C-y | 21 | 16 | 21
(Austria) D Obernosterer | 18 | 21 | 21
5 | (Guatemala) K Cordon | 21 | 15 | 12

Third Round
(Chinese Taipei) Lo C-y | 21 | 19 | 15
(Austria) D Obernosterer | 19 | 21 | 21

==== Section 8 ====
First Round
(Malaysia) Zh Zulkiffli
(United States) C Stensland | w/o
BYE
(Vietnam) Pham CC
(Peru) M Cuba | 20 | 21 | 21
(United States) S Blamchet | 22 | 15 | 12
BYE
2 | (Israel) M Zilberman

Second Round
(Malaysia) Zh Zulkiffli | 20 | 19
(Vietnam) Pham CC | 22 | 21
(Peru) M Cuba | 13 | 8
2 | (Israel) M Zilberman | 21 | 21

Third Round
(Vietnam) Pham CC | 19 | 17
2 | (Israel) M Zilberman | 21 | 21

== Women's singles ==
=== Seeds ===
1. (United States) Zhang Beiwen (champion)
2. (United States) Iris Wang (second round)
3. (United States) Jamie Subandhi (second round)
4. (Brazil) Fabiana Silva (second round)

=== Finals ===
Semifinals
1 | (United States) Zhang Beiwen | 21 | 21
(Canada) Brittney Tam | 16 | 14
(Czech Republic) Zuzana Pavelkova | 8 | 16
(Canada) Rachael Honderich | 21 | 21

Final
1 | (United States) Zhang Beiwen | 21 | 21
(Canada) Rachael Honderich | 11 | 13

=== Top half ===
==== Section 1 ====
First Round
1 | (United States) Zhang BW
BYE
(United States) A Phongasavithas
BYE
(Brazil) A Campos
BYE
(United States) D Gupta | 13 | 13
(Peru) D Macias | 21 | 21

Second Round
1 | (United States) Zhang BW | 21 | 21
(United States) A Phongasavithas | 2 | 4
(Brazil) A Campos | 6 | 7
(Peru) D Macias | 21 | 21

Quarterfinals
1 | (United States) Zhang BW | 21 | 21
(Peru) D Macias | 9 | 12

==== Section 2 ====
First Round
3 | (United States) J Subandhi
BYE
(Canada) B Tam | 21 | 21
(United States) S Lee | 7 | 4
(United States) S Pohl
BYE
(Australia) J Lai | 21 | 22
(Peru) D Nishimura | 13 | 20

Second Round
3 | (United States) J Subandhi | w/o
(Canada) B Tam
(United States) S Pohl | 3 | 9
(Australia) J Lai | 21 | 21

Quarterfinals
(Canada) B Tam | 22 | 21
(Australia) J Lai | 20 | 14

=== Bottom half ===
==== Section 3 ====
First Round
(Peru) L Zornoza | 17 | 7
(Czech Republic) Z Pavelkova | 21 | 21
BYE
(United States) V Phongasavithas
(United States) A Lee | 8 | 6
(Chinese Taipei) Su H-l | 21 | 21
BYE
4 | (Brazil) F Silva

Second Round
(Czech Republic) Z Pavelkova | 21 | 21
(United States) V Phongasavithas | 7 | 12
(Chinese Taipei) Su H-l | 21 | 21
4 | (Brazil) F Silva | 19 | 17

Quarterfinals
(Czech Republic) Z Pavelkova | 21 | 21
(Chinese Taipei) Su H-l | 18 | 17

==== Section 4 ====
First Round
(Canada) N Bergeron
(Indonesia) L Josephine | w/o
BYE
(United States) C Pan
(Austria) E Baldauf | 19 | 5
(Canada) R Honderich | 21 | 21
BYE
2 | (United States) I Wang

Second Round
(Canada) N Bergeron | 16 | 11
(United States) C Pan | 21 | 21
(Canada) R Honderich | 21 | 21
2 | (United States) I Wang | 17 | 12

Quarterfinals
(United States) C Pan | 18 | 1^{r}
(Canada) R Honderich | 21 | 1

== Men's doubles ==
=== Seeds ===
1. (Poland) Adam Cwalina / Przemysław Wacha (champion)
2. (United States) Phillip Chew / Sattawat Pongnairat (semi-final)
3. (Germany) Max Schwenger / Josche Zurwonne (second round)
4. (Guatemala) Solis Jonathan / Rodolfo Ramirez (second round)

=== Finals ===
Semifinals
1 | (Poland) Adam Cwalina (Poland) Przemysław Wacha | 21 | 21
(Canada) Kevin Li (Canada) Nyl Yakura | 14 | 13
(Japan) Taiki Shimada (Japan) Yoshinori Takeuchi | 21 | 23
2 | (United States) Phillip Chew (United States) Sattawat Pongnairat | 19 | 21

Final
1 | (Poland) Adam Cwalina (Poland) Przemysław Wacha | 21 | 21
(Japan) Taiki Shimada (Japan) Yoshinori Takeuchi | 13 | 6

=== Top half ===
==== Section 1 ====
First Round
1 | (Poland) A Cwałina (Poland) P Wacha
BYE
(United States) HL Lee (Canada) T Ng
BYE
(United States) R Chew (United States) R Gunawan
BYE
(Thailand) K Ketlen (Thailand) D Puavaranukroh | 21 | 21
(Guatemala) H Heymard (Guatemala) D Humblers | 5 | 14

Second Round
1 | (Poland) A Cwałina (Poland) P Wacha | 21 | 21
(United States) HL Lee (Canada) T Ng | 13 | 14
(United States) R Chew (United States) R Gunawan | 4 | 11
(Thailand) K Ketlen (Thailand) D Puavaranukroh | 21 | 21

Quarterfinals
1 | (Poland) A Cwałina (Poland) P Wacha | 21 | 13 | 21
(Thailand) K Ketlen (Thailand) D Puavaranukroh | 19 | 21 | 12

==== Section 2 ====
First Round
4 | (Guatemala) S Jonathan (Guatemala) R Ramirez
BYE
(United States) C Lin (United States) M Lin
BYE
(Canada) F Beaucage (Canada) A Droler
BYE
(Canada) K Li (Canada) N Yakura | 21 | 21
(Brazil) H Arthuso (Brazil) D Paiola | 17 | 17

Second Round
4 | (Guatemala) S Jonathan (Guatemala) R Ramirez | 21 | 21 | 20
(United States) C Lin (United States) M Lin | 19 | 23 | 22
(Canada) F Beaucage (Canada) A Droler | 14 | 9
(Canada) K Li (Canada) N Yakura | 21 | 21

Quarterfinals
(United States) C Lin (United States) M Lin | 14 | 12
(Canada) K Li (Canada) N Yakura | 21 | 21

=== Bottom half ===
==== Section 3 ====
First Round
(Guatemala) K Cordon (Guatemala) A Marroquin | 22 | 17 | 16
(Malaysia) Z B Zulkiffli (Malaysia) Zh Zulkiffli | 20 | 21 | 21
BYE
(United States) T Gunawan (United States) MY Ong
(Japan) T Shimada (Japan) Y Takeuchi | 21 | 21
(United States) D Schoppe (United States) T Wadood | 6 | 6
BYE
3 | (Germany) M Schwenger (Germany) J Zurwonne

Second Round
(Malaysia) Z B Zulkiffli (Malaysia) Zh Zulkiffli | 21 | 22 | 21
(United States) T Gunawan (United States) MY Ong | 18 | 24 | 12
(Japan) T Shimada (Japan) Y Takeuchi | 16 | 21 | 21
3 | (Germany) M Schwenger (Germany) J Zurwonne | 21 | 11 | 19

Quarterfinals
(Malaysia) Z B Zulkiffli (Malaysia) Zh Zulkiffli | 4 | 15
(Japan) T Shimada (Japan) Y Takeuchi | 21 | 21

==== Section 4 ====
First Round
(Brazil) L Santos Jr (Brazil) A Tjong | 20 | 15
(Scotland) A Casey (United States) K Emerick | 22 | 21
BYE
(Peru) M Cuba (Peru) M Valle
BYE
(Canada) P Pilote (Canada) M Tétreault
BYE
2 | (United States) P Chew (United States) S Pongnairat

Second Round
(Scotland) A Casey (United States) K Emerick | 15 | 15
(Peru) M Cuba (Peru) M Valle | 21 | 21
(Canada) P Pilote (Canada) M Tétreault | 11 | 12
2 | (United States) P Chew (United States) S Pongnairat | 21 | 21

Quarterfinals
(Peru) M Cuba (Peru) M Valle | 15 | 22 | 12
2 | (United States) P Chew (United States) S Pongnairat | 21 | 20 | 21

== Women's doubles ==
=== Seeds ===
1. (United States) Eva Lee / Paula Lynn Obanana (final)
2. (Germany) Johanna Goliszewski / Carla Nelte (quarter-final)

=== Finals ===
Semifinals
1 | (United States) Eva Lee (United States) Paula Lynn Obanana | 21 | 19 | 21
(Chinese Taipei) Yang Ching-tun (Chinese Taipei) Yu Min-ju | 10 | 21 | 16
(Canada) Alex Bruce (Canada) Phyllis Chan | 20 | 19
(Chinese Taipei) Hsieh Pei-chen (Chinese Taipei) Wu Ti-jung | 22 | 21

Final
1 | (United States) Eva Lee (United States) Paula Lynn Obanana | 16 | 10
(Chinese Taipei) Hsieh Pei-chen (Chinese Taipei) Wu Ti-jung | 21 | 21

=== Top half ===
First Round
1 | (United States) E Lee (United States) P Obanana
BYE
(Canada) G Gao (Canada) R Honderich | 21 | 21
(United States) P Phongasavithas (United States) V Phongasavithas | 3 | 8
(United States) A Lee (United States) S Lee | 4 | 2
(Brazil) P Pereira (Brazil) F Silva | 21 | 21
(Chinese Taipei) Yang C-t (Chinese Taipei) Yu M-j | 21 | 21
(Peru) K Winder (Peru) L Zornoza | 11 | 12

Quarterfinals
1 | (United States) E Lee (United States) P Obanana | 21 | 21 | 21
(Canada) G Gao (Canada) R Honderich | 14 | 23 | 18
(Brazil) P Pereira (Brazil) F Silva | 14 | 17
(Chinese Taipei) Yang C-t (Chinese Taipei) Yu M-j | 21 | 21

Semifinals
1 | (United States) E Lee (United States) P Obanana | 21 | 18 | 21
(Chinese Taipei) Yang C-t (Chinese Taipei) Yu M-j | 10 | 21 | 16

=== Bottom half ===
First Round
(Canada) N Grether (Canada) C Reid | w/o
(United States) JY Hong (United States) Zhang BW
(Canada) A Bruce (Canada) P Chan | 21 | 21
(Peru) D Macias (Peru) D Nishinura | 6 | 12
(Austria) E Baldauf (Germany) I Herttrich | 15 | 9
(Chinese Taipei) Hsieh P-c (Chinese Taipei) Wu T-j | 21 | 21
BYE
2 | (Germany) J Goliszewski (Germany) C Nelte

Quarterfinals
(United States) JY Hong (United States) Zhang BW | 19 | 16
(Canada) A Bruce (Canada) P Chan | 21 | 21
(Chinese Taipei) Hsieh P-c (Chinese Taipei) Wu T-j | 21 | 23
2 | (Germany) J Goliszewski (Germany) C Nelte | 10 | 21

Semifinals
(Canada) A Bruce (Canada) P Chan | 20 | 19
(Chinese Taipei) Hsieh P-c (Chinese Taipei) Wu T-j | 22 | 21

== Mixed doubles ==
=== Seeds ===
1. (Germany) Max Schwenger / Carla Nelte (semi-final)
2. (United States) Phillip Chew / Jamie Subandhi (second round)
3. (Germany) Peter Kaesbauer / Isabel Herttrich (champion)
4. (Peru) Mario Cuba / Katherine Winder (quarter-final)

=== Finals ===
Semifinals
1 | (Germany) Max Schwenger (Germany) Carla Nelte | w/o
(United States) Howard Shu (United States) Eva Lee
3 | (Germany) Peter Kaesbauer (Germany) Isabel Herttrich | 21 | 21
(United States) Halim Haryanto Ho (United States) Jing Yu Hong | 13 | 10

Final
(United States) Howard Shu (United States) Eva Lee | 12 | 14
3 | (Germany) Peter Kaesbauer (Germany) Isabel Herttrich | 21 | 21

=== Top half ===
==== Section 1 ====
First Round
1 | (Germany) M Schwenger (Germany) C Nelte
BYE
(Austria) D Obernosterer (Austria) E Baldauf | 21 | 22
(Chinese Taipei) Kuo C-h (Chinese Taipei) Yu M-j | 9 | 20
(United States) R Gunawan (United States) A Lee
BYE
(United States) T Gunawan (United States) E Gunawan | 19 | 21 | 21
(Canada) H Wiebe (Canada) G Gao | 21 | 14 | 9

Second Round
1 | (Germany) M Schwenger (Germany) C Nelte | 21 | 25
(Austria) D Obernosterer (Austria) E Baldauf | 13 | 23
(United States) R Gunawan (United States) A Lee | 7 | 10
(United States) T Gunawan (United States) E Gunawan | 21 | 21

Quarterfinals
1 | (Germany) M Schwenger (Germany) C Nelte | 17 | 21 | 21
(United States) T Gunawan (United States) E Gunawan | 21 | 16 | 16

==== Section 2 ====
First Round
4 | (Peru) M Cuba (Peru) K Winder
BYE
(Scotland) A Casey (United States) Y Kawasaki | 8 | 9
(Canada) K Li (Canada) R Honderich | 21 | 21
(Brazil) H Arthuso (Brazil) F Silva
BYE
(United States) H Shu (United States) E Lee | 21 | 21
(Canada) N Yakura (Canada) B Tam | 19 | 14

Second Round
4 | (Peru) M Cuba (Peru) K Winder | 17 | 25 | 21
(Canada) K Li (Canada) R Honderich | 21 | 23 | 15
(Brazil) H Arthuso (Brazil) F Silva | 8 | 20
(United States) H Shu (United States) E Lee | 21 | 22

Quarterfinals
4 | (Peru) M Cuba (Peru) K Winder | 18 | 16
(United States) H Shu (United States) E Lee | 21 | 21

=== Bottom half ===
==== Section 3 ====
First Round
(Peru) M Valle (Peru) D Macias | 17 | 21 | 10
(Canada) F Beaucage (Canada) N Bergeron | 21 | 16 | 21
(Chinese Taipei) Lo C-y (Chinese Taipei) Hsieh P-c | 21 | 16 | 20
(Canada) T Ng (Canada) A Bruce | 15 | 21 | 22
(Brazil) A Tjong (Brazil) A Campos | 20 | 10
(Canada) P Charron (Canada) P Chan | 22 | 21
BYE
3 | (Germany) P Kaesbauer (Germany) I Herttrich

Second Round
(Canada) F Beaucage (Canada) N Bergeron | 12 | 10
(Canada) T Ng (Canada) A Bruce | 21 | 21
(Canada) P Charron (Canada) P Chan | 9 | 13
3 | (Germany) P Kaesbauer (Germany) I Herttrich | 21 | 21

Quarterfinals
(Canada) T Ng (Canada) A Bruce | 25 | 15
3 | (Germany) P Kaesbauer (Germany) I Herttrich | 27 | 21

==== Section 4 ====
First Round
(United States) H Ho (United States) JY Hong
(Australia) S Serasinghe (Australia) S Mapasa | w/o
BYE
(Peru) A Corpancho (Peru) L Zornoza
(United States) R Chew (United States) S Lee | 9 | 13
(Brazil) D Paiola (Brazil) P Pereira | 21 | 21
BYE
2 | (United States) P Chew (United States) J Subandhi

Second Round
(United States) H Ho (United States) JY Hong | 19 | 21 | 21
(Peru) A Corpancho (Peru) L Zornoza | 21 | 17 | 10
(Brazil) D Paiola (Brazil) P Pereira
2 | (United States) P Chew (United States) J Subandhi | w/o

Quarterfinals
(United States) H Ho (United States) JY Hong | 21 | 21
(Brazil) D Paiola (Brazil) P Pereira | 14 | 11

| Preceded by 2014 Macau Open Grand Prix Gold | BWF Grand Prix Gold and Grand Prix; 2014 season | Succeeded by 2015 Malaysia Open Grand Prix Gold |
