= US International =

US International may refer to:

- the US-International keyboard layout
- the U.S. International badminton tournament
