= Hsieh Pei-chen =

Taiwanese badminton player (born 1988)

Hsieh Pei-chen 謝沛蓁
Personal information
- Born: 31 January 1988 (age 38) Taipei, Taiwan
- Height: 1.59 m (5 ft 3 in)
- Weight: 53 kg (117 lb)

Sport
- Country: Republic of China (Taiwan)
- Sport: Badminton
- Handedness: Right

Women's & mixed doubles
- Highest ranking: 18 (WD 28 August 2014); 60 (XD 21 June 2012)
- BWF profile
Medal record
Women's badminton
Representing Chinese Taipei
East Asian Games
Silver medal – second place	2009 Hong Kong	Women's team
Silver medal – second place	2013 Tianjin	Women's team
Bronze medal – third place	2009 Hong Kong	Mixed doubles
Bronze medal – third place	2013 Tianjin	Women's doubles
Summer Universiade
Silver medal – second place	2011 Shenzhen	Mixed doubles
Bronze medal – third place	2011 Shenzhen	Women's doubles
Bronze medal – third place	2011 Shenzhen	Mixed team
Bronze medal – third place	2015 Gwangju	Mixed doubles
Asian Junior Championships
Bronze medal – third place	2005 Jakarta	Mixed doubles
Bronze medal – third place	2004 Hwacheon	Girls' team

Hsieh Pei-chen (Chinese: 謝沛蓁; pinyin: Xiè Pèizhēn; born 31 January 1988) is a Taiwanese badminton player. She won gold medal at the 2010 World University Championships in the mixed doubles event partnered with Chen Hung-ling.

== Achievements ==
=== East Asian Games ===
Women's doubles
Year	Venue	Partner	Opponent	Score	Result
2013	Binhai New Area Dagang Gymnasium; Tianjin, China	(Chinese Taipei) Cheng Wen-hsing	(China) Ou Dongni (China) Tang Yuanting	17–21, 18–21	Bronze

Mixed doubles
Year	Venue	Partner	Opponent	Score	Result
2009	Queen Elizabeth Stadium; Hong Kong	(Chinese Taipei) Chen Hung-ling	(China) Zhang Yawen (China) Tao Jiaming	15–21, 16–21	Bronze

=== Summer Universiade ===
Women's doubles
Year	Venue	Partner	Opponent	Score	Result
2011	Gymnasium of SZIIT; Shenzhen, China	(Chinese Taipei) Wang Pei-rong	(Chinese Taipei) Cheng Shao-chieh (Chinese Taipei) Pai Hsiao-ma	19–21, 21–18, 12–21	Bronze

Mixed doubles
Year	Venue	Partner	Opponent	Score	Result
2011	Gymnasium of SZIIT; Shenzhen, China	(Chinese Taipei) Lee Sheng-mu	(South Korea) Shin Baek-choel (South Korea) Eom Hye-won	21–15, 11–21, 19–21	Silver
2015	Hwasun Hanium Culture Sports Center; Hwasun, South Korea	(Chinese Taipei) Tseng Min-hao	(Chinese Taipei) Lu Ching-yao (Chinese Taipei) Chiang Kai-hsin	15–21, 21–18, 15–21	Bronze

=== World University Championships ===
Women's doubles
Year	Venue	Partner	Opponent	Score	Result
2014	Municipal Sport Palace Vista Alegre; Córdoba, Spain	(Chinese Taipei) Wu Ti-jung	(China) Ou Dongni (China) Tang Yuanting	8–21, 13–21	Bronze

Mixed doubles
Year	Venue	Partner	Opponent	Score	Result
2010	Taipei Gymnasium; Taipei, Chinese Taipei	(Chinese Taipei) Chen Hung-ling	(China) Huang Haitao (China) Cheng Shu	21–11, 21–19	Gold

=== Asian Junior Championships ===
Mixed doubles
Year	Venue	Partner	Opponent	Score	Result
2005	Tennis Indoor Senayan; Jakarta, Indonesia	(Chinese Taipei) Cheng Jen-yo	(South Korea) Lee Yong-dae (South Korea) Ha Jung-eun	4–15, 2–15	Bronze

=== BWF Grand Prix ===
The BWF Grand Prix has two levels, the BWF Grand Prix and Grand Prix Gold. It is a series of badminton tournaments sanctioned by the Badminton World Federation (BWF) since 2007.

Women's doubles
Year	Tournament	Partner	Opponent	Score	Result
2014	U.S. Grand Prix	(Chinese Taipei) Wu Ti-jung	(United States) Eva Lee (United States) Paula Lynn Obanana	21–16, 21–10	(gold) Winner

BWF Grand Prix Gold tournament
BWF Grand Prix tournament

=== BWF International Challenge/Series ===
Women's doubles
Year	Tournament	Partner	Opponent	Score	Result
2008	Australian International	(Chinese Taipei) Lee Tai-an	(Japan) Yasuyo Imabeppu (Japan) Shizuka Matsuo	17–21, 10–21	(silver) Runner-up

Mixed doubles
Year	Tournament	Partner	Opponent	Score	Result
2008	Hellas International	(Chinese Taipei) Chen Hung-ling	(Denmark) Peter Mork (Denmark) Maria Helsbol	21–6, 21–9	(gold) Winner

BWF International Challenge tournament
BWF International Series tournament
BWF Future Series tournament
