= Beiwen Zhang =

Badminton player (born 1990)

Beiwen Zhang 张蓓雯
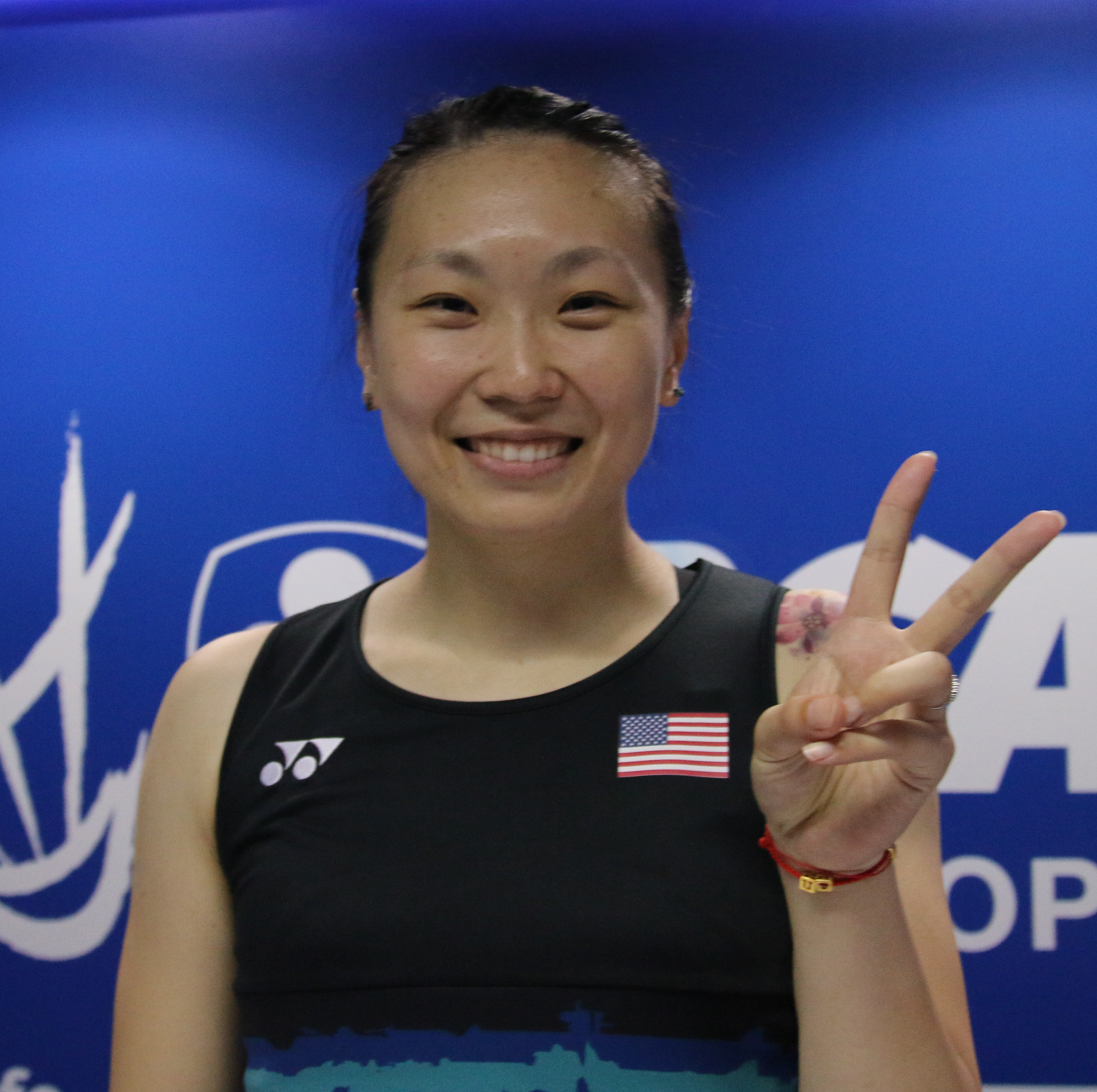
- Zhang at 2017 Indonesia Super Series Premier

Personal information
- Born: 12 July 1990 (age 36) Anshan, Liaoning, China
- Height: 1.69 m (5 ft 7 in)

Sport
- Country: China (1990–2007); Singapore (2007–2013); United States (2013–present)
- Sport: Badminton
- Handedness: Right

Women's singles
- Career record: 358 wins, 195 losses
- Highest ranking: 9 (22 June 2017)
- Current ranking: 33 (3 November 2026)
- BWF profile
Medal record
Women's badminton
Representing the United States
Pan American Games
Gold medal – first place	2023 Santiago	Women's singles
Pan Am Championships
Gold medal – first place	2021 Guatemala City	Women's singles
Gold medal – first place	2024 Guatemala City	Women's singles
Silver medal – second place	2022 San Salvador	Women's singles
Silver medal – second place	2023 Kingston	Women's singles
Pan Am Mixed Team Championships
Silver medal – second place	2023 Guadalajara	Mixed team
Pan Am Female Badminton Cup
Silver medal – second place	2024 São Paulo	Women's team
Silver medal – second place	2026 Guatemala City	Women's team
Representing Singapore
Southeast Asian Games
Bronze medal – third place	2009 Vientiane	Women's team
World Junior Championships
Bronze medal – third place	2007 Waitakere City	Mixed team

Beiwen Zhang (simplified Chinese: 张蓓雯; traditional Chinese: 張蓓雯; pinyin: Zhāng Bèiwén; born 12 July 1990) is a badminton player who is a singles specialist. Born in China, she previously represented Singapore and currently represents the United States. She won the women's singles title at the 2021 Pan Am Championships and at the 2023 Pan American Games.

== Career ==
=== 2003–2013: Singapore ===
Zhang was born in China and moved to Singapore at the age of 13 in 2003, under the Foreign Sports Talent Scheme, and played with the Singapore National Team until 2012. In 2007, Zhang took up Singapore citizenship.

In 2009, she was part of the Singapore national badminton team, winning a bronze medal at the women's team event of the 2009 Southeast Asian Games. After a one-year break in which she did not play any tournaments at all, in 2013, she came back on her way to reach top level again.

In 2011, her contract with the Singapore Badminton Association (SBA) was not renewed after a reported falling out with then-singles head coach Luan Ching over a curfew.

=== 2013–present: United States ===
In 2013, Zhang moved to Las Vegas with her parents and continued playing the sport. That same year, she won four international challenge tournaments with singles titles at the Swiss International in Yverdon-les-Bains; the Yonex USA International in Orlando, Florida; the Yonex Welsh International in Cardiff; and the Carlton Irish Open International in Dublin. In 2014, she continued her winning streak for her new country the US, with victories in Peru, the US, Brazil and the Netherlands. She won her first Grand Prix title at the 2014 U.S. Open Grand Prix Gold, then won the 2014 Brazil Open Grand Prix and 2014 Dutch Open Grand Prix.

In 2016, Zhang started to compete in the Danish Badminton League, for Vendsyssel Elite Badminton. Zhang reached the final round at a BWF Super Series event, the French Open, for the first time, but finished as the runner-up after losing the final to He Bingjiao of China in straight games. In 2018, she won her first BWF World Tour title at the India Open, defeating host player and defending champion P. V. Sindhu with the score 21–18, 11–21, 22–20 in the final.

In 2021, Zhang competed in her first Pan Am Championships and clinched the women's singles title after beating Rachel Chan of Canada in straight games. On March the same year, she became a naturalized U.S. citizen. She then competed in the 2020 Summer Olympics. Her bid for a medal was cut short, however, when she suffered an apparent achilles injury during a match against He Bingjiao of China in the round of 16.

Zhang started the 2023 season in Asia by competing in Malaysia, India, Indonesia, and Thailand，where her best performance was entering the quarter-finals in India. Her performance improved on tour in Europe, by being a finalist in the Orléans Masters, semi-finalist in the Swiss Open, and also quarter-finalist in the Spain Masters. She then took part in the Pan Am Championships in Jamaica, and won the women's singles silver medal. Zhang's form picked up in recent months. She finished runner-up at the Taipei Open in June, made the Canada Open semi-finals and reached the Japan Open quarter-finals in July. She then won her first World Tour title in five years in the Australian Open in August, beating Kim Ga-eun in the final. In October, she claimed the gold medal in the women's singles in her debut at the Pan American Games.

== Achievements ==
=== Pan American Games ===
Women's singles
Year	Venue	Opponent	Score	Result
2023	Olympic Training Center, Santiago, Chile	(United States) Jennie Gai	21–8, 21–12	Gold

=== Pan American Championships ===
Women's singles
Year	Venue	Opponent	Score	Result
2021	Sagrado Corazon de Jesus, Guatemala City, Guatemala	(Canada) Rachel Chan	21–14, 21–18	Gold
2022	Palacio de los Deportes Carlos "El Famoso" Hernández, San Salvador, El Salvador	(Canada) Michelle Li	18–21, 21–16, 23–25	Silver
2023	G.C. Foster College of Physical Education and Sport, Kingston, Jamaica	(Canada) Michelle Li	19–21, 9–21	Silver
2024	Teodoro Palacios Flores Gymnasium, Guatemala City, Guatemala	(Canada) Michelle Li	21–18, 18–21, 21–17	Gold

=== BWF World Tour (4 titles, 5 runners-up) ===
The BWF World Tour, which was announced on 19 March 2017 and implemented in 2018, is a series of elite badminton tournaments sanctioned by the Badminton World Federation (BWF). The BWF World Tour is divided into levels of World Tour Finals, Super 1000, Super 750, Super 500, Super 300, and the BWF Tour Super 100.

Women's singles
Year	Tournament	Level	Opponent	Score	Result
2018	India Open	Super 500	(India) P. V. Sindhu	21–18, 11–21, 22–20	(gold) Winner
2018	U.S. Open	Super 300	(China) Li Xuerui	26–24, 15–21, 11–21	(silver) Runner-up
2018	Korea Open	Super 500	(Japan) Nozomi Okuhara	10–21, 21–17, 16–21	(silver) Runner-up
2023	Orléans Masters	Super 300	(Spain) Carolina Marín	23–25, 21–9, 10–21	(silver) Runner-up
2023	Taipei Open	Super 300	(Chinese Taipei) Tai Tzu-ying	14–21, 17–21	(silver) Runner-up
2023	Australian Open	Super 500	(South Korea) Kim Ga-eun	20–22, 21–16, 21–8	(gold) Winner
2023	Hylo Open	Super 300	(Denmark) Line Kjærsfeldt	21–18, 16–21, 21–16	(gold) Winner
2024	U.S. Open	Super 300	(Japan) Natsuki Nidaira	21–17, 18–21, 22–24	(silver) Runner-up
2025	U.S. Open	Super 300	(India) Tanvi Sharma	21–11, 16–21, 21–10	(gold) Winner

=== BWF Superseries (1 runner-up) ===
The BWF Superseries, which was launched on 14 December 2006 and implemented in 2007, was a series of elite badminton tournaments, sanctioned by the Badminton World Federation (BWF). BWF Superseries levels were Superseries and Superseries Premier. A season of Superseries consisted of twelve tournaments around the world that had been introduced since 2011. Successful players were invited to the Superseries Finals, which were held at the end of each year.

Women's singles
Year	Tournament	Opponent	Score	Result
2016	French Open	(China) He Bingjiao	9–21 9–21	(silver) Runner-up

BWF Super Series Finals tournament
BWF Super Series Premier tournament
BWF Super Series tournament

=== BWF Grand Prix (7 titles, 2 runner-up) ===
The BWF Grand Prix had two levels, the Grand Prix and Grand Prix Gold. It was a series of badminton tournaments sanctioned by the Badminton World Federation (BWF) and played between 2007 and 2017.

Women's singles
Year	Tournament	Opponent	Score	Result
2008	Vietnam Open	(Singapore) Xing Aiying	11–21, 21–19, 22–20	(gold) Winner
2014	U.S. Open	(Japan) Kana Ito	21–8, 21–17	(gold) Winner
2014	Brasil Open	(Japan) Kaori Imabeppu	6–11, 11–5, 4–11, 11–8, 11–9	(gold) Winner
2014	Dutch Open	(Chinese Taipei) Pai Yu-po	11–9, 11–7, 11–8	(gold) Winner
2014	U.S. Grand Prix	(Canada) Rachel Honderich	21–11, 21–13	(gold) Winner
2016	Canada Open	(Canada) Michelle Li	Walkover	(silver) Runner-up
2016	Dutch Open	(Chinese Taipei) Hsu Ya-ching	21–11, 21–19	(gold) Winner
2017	Dutch Open	(Canada) Michelle Li	21–16, 21–14	(gold) Winner
2017	Bitburger Open	(Thailand) Nitchaon Jindapol	17–21, 21–15, 19–21	(silver) Runner-up

BWF Grand Prix Gold tournament
BWF Grand Prix tournament

=== BWF International Challenge/Series (9 titles, 2 runner-up) ===
Women's singles
Year	Tournament	Opponent	Score	Result
2013	Swiss International	(India) Tanvi Lad	21–12, 21–12	(gold) Winner
2013	USA International	(United States) Iris Wang	21–10, 21–12	(gold) Winner
2013	Welsh International	(Spain) Beatriz Corrales	21–12, 21–15	(gold) Winner
2013	Irish Open	(Spain) Beatriz Corrales	21–9, 17–21, 21–10	(gold) Winner
2014	Peru International	(Canada) Michelle Li	27–25, 21–19	(gold) Winner
2015	USA International	(Chinese Taipei) Pai Yu-po	21–14, 13–21, 21–19	(gold) Winner
2016	Yonex / K&D Graphics International	(Canada) Rachel Honderich	21–13, 21–12	(gold) Winner

Women's doubles
Year	Tournament	Partner	Opponent	Score	Result
2005	Croatian International	(Singapore) Fu Mingtian	(Singapore) Frances Liu (Singapore) Shinta Mulia Sari	Walkover	(silver) Runner-up
2007	Croatian International	(Singapore) Gu Juan	(China) Cai Jiani (China) Guo Xin	21–15, 6–21, 10–21	(silver) Runner-up
2013	USA International	(United States) Jing Yu Hong	(Brazil) Paula Pereira (Brazil) Lohaynny Vicente	21–7, 21–14	(gold) Winner
2016	Yonex / K&D Graphics International	(United States) Jing Yu Hong	(United States) Eva Lee (United States) Paula Lynn Obañana	21–17, 22–20	(gold) Winner

BWF International Challenge tournament
BWF International Series tournament
BWF Future Series tournament

== Record against selected opponents ==
Record against Year-end Finals finalists, World Championships semi-finalists, and Olympic quarter-finalists. Accurate as of 6 August 2024.

Players	Matches	Results		Difference
Players	Matches	Won	Lost	Difference
(China) Chen Yufei	7	1	6	–5
(China) He Bingjiao	13	2	11	–9
(China) Li Xuerui	3	0	3	–3
(China) Wang Lin	3	0	3	–3
(China) Wang Shixian	1	0	1	–1
(China) Wang Yihan	3	0	3	–3
(China) Wang Xin	1	0	1	–1
(China) Zhang Yiman	3	2	1	+1
(Chinese Taipei) Cheng Shao-chieh	1	0	1	–1
(Chinese Taipei) Tai Tzu-ying	13	3	10	–7
(Denmark) Tine Baun	1	0	1	–1
(Germany) Juliane Schenk	2	1	1	0
(Hong Kong) Yip Pui Yin	4	3	1	+2
(India) Saina Nehwal	4	1	3	–2

Players	Matches	Results		Difference
Players	Matches	Won	Lost	Difference
(India) P. V. Sindhu	12	5	7	–2
(Indonesia) Maria Kristin Yulianti	1	1	0	+1
(Indonesia) Gregoria Mariska Tunjung	8	2	6	–4
(Japan) Minatsu Mitani	4	2	2	0
(Japan) Aya Ohori	5	4	1	+3
(Japan) Nozomi Okuhara	7	0	7	–7
(Japan) Akane Yamaguchi	11	4	7	–3
(South Korea) An Se-young	5	0	5	–5
(South Korea) Bae Yeon-ju	4	2	2	0
(South Korea) Sung Ji-hyun	6	3	3	0
(Spain) Carolina Marín	12	3	9	–6
(Thailand) Porntip Buranaprasertsuk	3	3	0	+3
(Thailand) Ratchanok Intanon	8	2	6	–4
