= Kang Min-woo =

Kang Min-woo may refer to:

- Kang Min-woo (footballer, born 1987), South Korean football defender
- Kang Min-woo (footballer, born 2006), South Korean football defender for Jong Genk
