= Yoshinori Takeuchi =

Japanese badminton player (born 1992)

Personal information
- Born: 8 October 1992 (age 34) Saitama Prefecture, Japan
- Height: 1.80 m (5 ft 11 in)
- Weight: 70 kg (154 lb)
- Spouse: Mami Naito (m. 2018)

Sport
- Country: Japan
- Sport: Badminton
- Handedness: Right
- Retired: 28 March 2025

Men's and mixed doubles
- Highest ranking: 26 (MD with Keiichiro Matsui, 19 September 2023); 285 (XD with Ayako Sakuramoto, 19 January 2017)
- BWF profile
Medal record
Men's badminton
Representing Japan
Thomas Cup
Bronze medal – third place	2022 Bangkok	Men's team

Yoshinori Takeuchi (竹內 義憲, Takeuchi Yoshinori; born 8 October 1992) is a Japanese badminton player.

== Career summary ==
In 2013, he competed at the Summer Universiade in Kazan, Russia. In 2014, he became the runner-up at the U.S. Open Grand Prix tournament in the men's doubles event partnered with Taiki Shimada.

Takeuchi announced his retirement via Instagram on 28 March 2025.

== Personal life ==
In 2018, Takeuchi married Mami Naito, a former member of the Japan national team.

== Achievements ==
=== BWF World Tour (1 runner-up) ===
The BWF World Tour, which was announced on 19 March 2017 and implemented in 2018, is a series of elite badminton tournaments sanctioned by the Badminton World Federation (BWF). The BWF World Tour is divided into levels of World Tour Finals, Super 1000, Super 750, Super 500, Super 300 (part of the HSBC World Tour), and the BWF Tour Super 100.

Men's doubles
Year	Tournament	Level	Partner	Opponent	Score	Result	Ref.
2019	Russian Open	Super 100	(Japan) Keiichiro Matsui	(Denmark) Mathias Boe (Denmark) Mads Conrad-Petersen	18–21, 13–21	(silver) Runner-up	

=== BWF Grand Prix (1 runner-up) ===
The BWF Grand Prix had two levels, the Grand Prix and Grand Prix Gold. It was a series of badminton tournaments sanctioned by the Badminton World Federation (BWF) and played between 2007 and 2017.

Men's doubles
Year	Tournament	Partner	Opponent	Score	Result	Ref.
2014	U.S. Grand Prix	(Japan) Taiki Shimada	(Poland) Adam Cwalina (Poland) Przemysław Wacha	13–21, 6–21	(silver) Runner-up	

BWF Grand Prix tournament

=== BWF International Challenge/Series (2 titles, 1 runner-up) ===
Men's doubles
Year	Tournament	Partner	Opponent	Score	Result	Ref.
2017	Spanish International	(Japan) Keiichiro Matsui	(Netherlands) Jacco Arends (Netherlands) Ruben Jille	17–21, 19–21	(silver) Runner Up	
2019	Maldives International	(Japan) Keiichiro Matsui	(India) Arun George (India) Sanyam Shukla	21–9, 22–20	(gold) Winner	
2019	Dubai International	(Japan) Keiichiro Matsui	(Malaysia) Shia Chun Kang (Malaysia) Tan Boon Heong	21–14, 21–14	(gold) Winner	

BWF International Challenge tournament
