= Wu Ti-jung =

Taiwanese badminton player (born 1993)

Wu Ti-jung 吳玓蓉
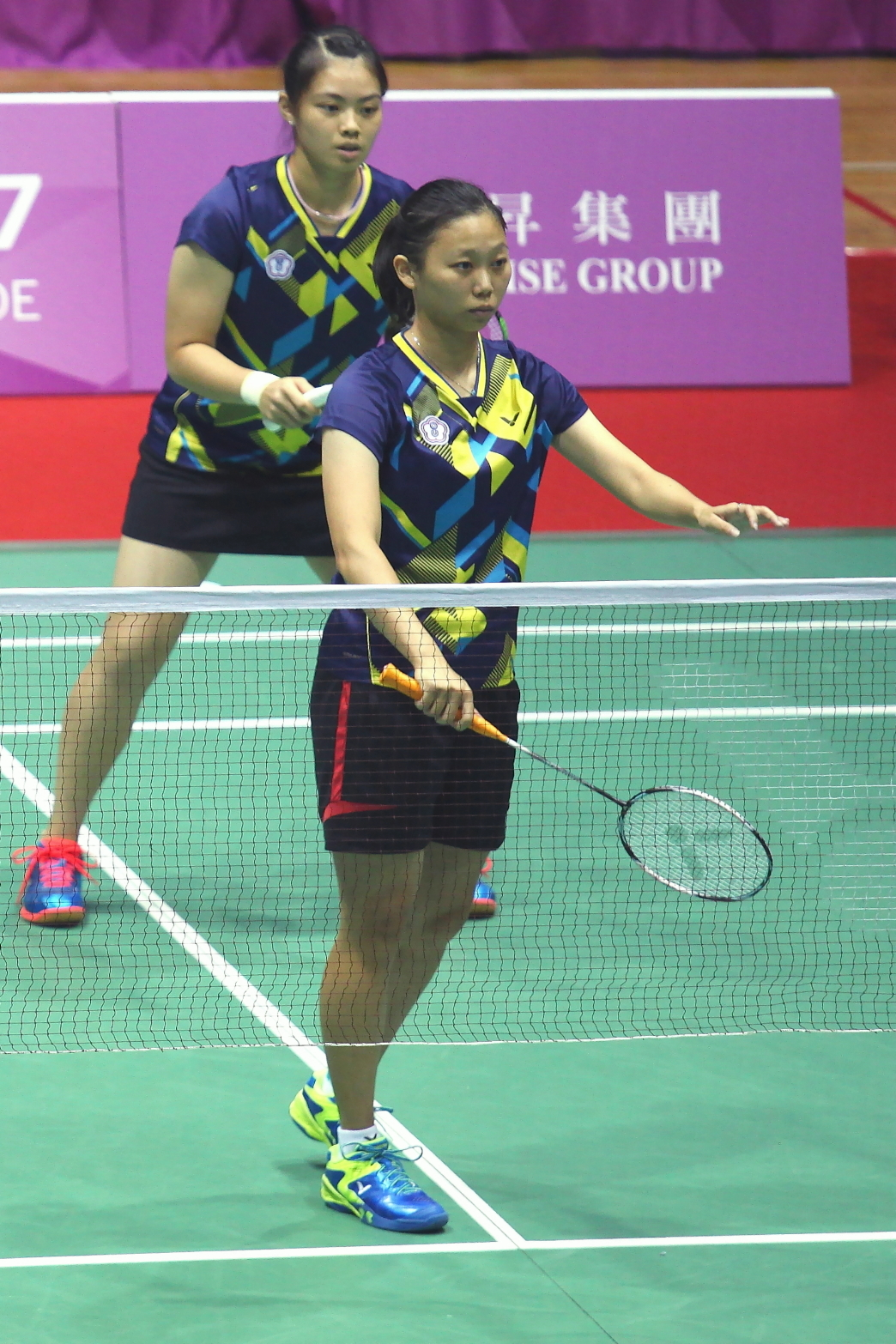

Personal information
- Born: 23 February 1993 (age 33) Taipei, Taiwan
- Height: 1.66 m (5 ft 5 in)

Sport
- Country: Republic of China (Taiwan)
- Sport: Badminton
- Handedness: Right

Women's & mixed doubles
- Highest ranking: 17 (WD 15 June 2017); 33 (XD 12 October 2017)
- Current ranking: 100 (WD), 207 (XD) (17 March 2020)
- BWF profile
Medal record
Women's badminton
Representing Chinese Taipei
Summer Universiade
Gold medal – first place	2017 Taipei	Women's doubles
Gold medal – first place	2017 Taipei	Mixed team
World Junior Championships
Bronze medal – third place	2011 Taipei	Mixed team

Wu Ti-jung (Chinese: 吳玓蓉; born 23 February 1993) is a Taiwanese badminton player. Teamed-up with Lee Chia-hsin, she won the 2013 Polish International tournament. Her big achievement is to win the women's doubles title at the 2014 U.S. Open Grand Prix partnered with Hsieh Pei-chen.

== Achievements ==
=== Summer Universiade ===
Women's doubles
Year	Venue	Partner	Opponent	Score	Result
2017	Taipei Gymnasium; Taipei, Taiwan	(Chinese Taipei) Hsu Ya-ching	(Thailand) Chayanit Chaladchalam (Thailand) Phataimas Muenwong	21–17, 22–20	Gold

=== BWF World Tour (1 runner-up) ===
The BWF World Tour, which was announced on 19 March 2017 and implemented in 2018, is a series of elite badminton tournaments, sanctioned by Badminton World Federation (BWF). The BWF World Tour is divided into six levels, namely World Tour Finals, Super 1000, Super 750, Super 500, Super 300 (part of the HSBC World Tour), and the BWF Tour Super 100.

Mixed doubles
Year	Tournament	Level	Partner	Opponent	Score	Result
2018	Chinese Taipei Open	Super 300	(Chinese Taipei) Yang Po-hsuan	(Indonesia) Alfian Eko Prasetya (Indonesia) Marsheilla Gischa Islami	15–21, 11–21	(silver) Runner-up

=== BWF Grand Prix (1 title) ===
The BWF Grand Prix had two levels, the Grand Prix and Grand Prix Gold. It was a series of badminton tournaments, sanctioned by the Badminton World Federation (BWF) from 2007 to 2017.

Women's doubles
Year	Tournament	Partner	Opponent	Score	Result
2014	U.S. Grand Prix	(Chinese Taipei) Hsieh Pei-chen	(United States) Eva Lee (United States) Paula Lynn Obanana	21–16, 21–10	(gold) Winner

BWF Grand Prix Gold tournament
BWF Grand Prix tournament

=== BWF International Challenge/Series (4 titles, 2 runners-up) ===
Women's doubles
Year	Tournament	Partner	Opponent	Score	Result
2013	Polish International	(Chinese Taipei) Lee Chia-hsin	(Chinese Taipei) Chiang Mei-hui (Chinese Taipei) Hsu Ya-ching	21–10, 21–16	(gold) Winner
2020	Slovak International	(Chinese Taipei) Hsieh Pei-shan	(Chinese Taipei) Lee Chia-hsin (Chinese Taipei) Lin Jhih-yun	18–21, 18–21	(silver) Runner-up
2022	Bahrain International	(Chinese Taipei) Liang Ting-yu	(Chinese Taipei) Hsieh Pei-shan (Chinese Taipei) Tseng Yu-chi	21–19, 20–22, 21–10	(gold) Winner

Mixed doubles
Year	Tournament	Partner	Opponent	Score	Result
2013	Czech International	(Chinese Taipei) Wang Chi-lin	(Czech Republic) Jakub Bitman (Czech Republic) Alzbeta Basova	21–19, 21–13	(gold) Winner
2013	Malaysia International	(Chinese Taipei) Wang Chi-lin	(Indonesia) Alfian Eko Prasetya (Indonesia) Shendy Puspa Irawati	15–21, 16–21	(silver) Runner-up
2020	Slovak International	(Chinese Taipei) Lu Ming-che	(Chinese Taipei) Tseng Min-hao (Chinese Taipei) Hsieh Pei-shan	21–15, 21–14	(gold) Winner

BWF International Challenge tournament
BWF International Series tournament
BWF Future Series tournament
