= Adam Cwalina =

Polish badminton player (born 1985)

Personal information
- Born: 26 January 1985 (age 41) Częstochowa, Poland
- Years active: 2008
- Height: 1.86 m (6 ft 1 in)
- Weight: 82 kg (181 lb)

Sport
- Country: Poland
- Sport: Badminton
- Handedness: Right
- Coached by: Tadeusz Brzozowski; Jacek Hankiewicz

Men's & mixed doubles
- Highest ranking: 19 (MD 26 February 2015); 43 (XD 26 August 2010)
- Current ranking: 74 (MD 14 May 2019)
- BWF profile
Medal record
Men's badminton
Representing Poland
European Mixed Team Championships
Bronze medal – third place	2008 Herning	Mixed team
European Men's Team Championships
Silver medal – second place	2010 Warsaw	Men's team

Adam Cwalina (Polish pronunciation: [ˈadam tsfaˈlina]; born 26 January 1985) is a Polish badminton player. He competed in men's doubles event at the 2012 Summer Olympics with Michał Łogosz and 2016 Summer Olympics with Przemysław Wacha.

== Achievements ==
=== BWF Grand Prix ===
The BWF Grand Prix had two levels, the Grand Prix and Grand Prix Gold. It was a series of badminton tournaments sanctioned by the Badminton World Federation (BWF) and played between 2007 and 2017.

Men's doubles
Year	Tournament	Partner	Opponent	Score	Result
2011	Dutch Open	(Poland) Michał Łogosz	(Germany) Ingo Kindervater (Germany) Johannes Schöttler	21–19, 19–21, 21–14	(gold) Winner
2014	U.S. Grand Prix	(Poland) Przemysław Wacha	(Japan) Taiki Shimada (Japan) Yoshinori Takeuchi	21–13, 21–6	(gold) Winner

BWF Grand Prix Gold tournament
BWF Grand Prix tournament

=== BWF International Challenge/Series ===
Men's doubles
Year	Tournament	Partner	Opponent	Score	Result
2006	Estonian International	(Poland) Rafał Hawel	(Russia) Andrey Ashmarin (Russia) Anton Nazarenko	17–21, 15–21	(silver) Runner-up
2006	Lithuanian International	(Poland) Wojciech Szkudlarczyk	(Czech Republic) Pavel Florián (Czech Republic) Stanislav Kohoutek	26–24, 21–9	(gold) Winner
2007	Welsh International	(Poland) Wojciech Szkudlarczyk	(England) Matthew Honey (England) Peter Mills	21–10, 20–22, 21–15	(gold) Winner
2008	Polish International	(Poland) Wojciech Szkudlarczyk	(Poland) Michał Łogosz (Poland) Robert Mateusiak	16–21, 5–21	(silver) Runner-up
2008	Spanish International	(Poland) Wojciech Szkudlarczyk	(Indonesia) Fran Kurniawan (Indonesia) Rendra Wijaya	11–21, 13–21	(silver) Runner-up
2008	Bulgarian International	(Poland) Wojciech Szkudlarczyk	(Russia) Vitalij Durkin (Russia) Aleksandr Nikolaenko	23–21, 12–21, 20–22	(silver) Runner-up
2009	Hungarian International	(Poland) Wojciech Szkudlarczyk	(Russia) Vladimir Ivanov (Russia) Ivan Sozonov	21–17, 13–21, 28–26	(gold) Winner
2010	White Nights	(Poland) Michał Łogosz	(Russia) Vitalij Durkin (Russia) Alexander Nikolaenko	21–19, 29–27	(gold) Winner
2010	Kharkiv International	(Poland) Michał Łogosz	(Russia) Vladimir Ivanov (Russia) Ivan Sozonov	28–26, 21–15	(gold) Winner
2010	Turkey International	(Poland) Michał Łogosz	(Russia) Vladimir Ivanov (Russia) Ivan Sozonov	12–21, 18–21	(silver) Runner-up
2011	Polish Open	(Poland) Michał Łogosz	(Russia) Vladimir Ivanov (Russia) Ivan Sozonov	21–23, 17–21	(silver) Runner-up
2011	Kharkiv International	(Poland) Michał Łogosz	(Russia) Vladimir Ivanov (Russia) Ivan Sozonov	21–19, 19–21, 16–21	(silver) Runner-up
2011	Belgian International	(Poland) Michał Łogosz	(Austria) Jürgen Koch (Austria) Peter Zauner	21–11, 21–15	(gold) Winner
2011	Brazil International	(Poland) Michał Łogosz	(Russia) Vladimir Ivanov (Russia) Ivan Sozonov	21–16, 14–21, 22–24	(silver) Runner-up
2011	Czech International	(Poland) Michał Łogosz	(Russia) Vitalij Durkin (Russia) Alexandr Nikolaenko	21–13, 21–16	(gold) Winner
2011	Norwegian International	(Poland) Michał Łogosz	(Denmark) Rasmus Bonde (Denmark) Anders Kristiansen	17–21, 18–21	(silver) Runner-up
2011	Irish International	(Poland) Michał Łogosz	(England) Marcus Ellis (England) Peter Mills	21–15, 21–15	(gold) Winner
2012	Polish Open	(Poland) Michał Łogosz	(Russia) Vladimir Ivanov (Russia) Ivan Sozonov	11–21, 13–21	(silver) Runner-up
2012	Belgian International	(Netherlands) Koen Ridder	(England) Marcus Ellis (Scotland) Paul van Rietvelde	21–18, 21–17	(gold) Winner
2012	Swiss International	(Poland) Przemysław Wacha	(England) Chris Coles (England) Matthew Nottingham	23–21, 21–14	(gold) Winner
2013	Polish Open	(Poland) Przemysław Wacha	(Japan) Yuya Komatsuzaki (Japan) Hiroki Takeuchi	21–19, 22–24, 21–17	(gold) Winner
2013	French International	(Poland) Przemysław Wacha	(France) Baptiste Carême (France) Gaëtan Mittelheisser	21–18, 21–16	(gold) Winner
2013	Spanish Open	(Poland) Przemysław Wacha	(Poland) Michał Łogosz (Poland) Łukasz Moreń	21–10, 18–21, 21–19	(gold) Winner
2013	Kharkiv International	(Poland) Przemysław Wacha	(Denmark) Kim Astrup (Denmark) Anders Skaarup Rasmussen	22–20, 15–21, 21–12	(gold) Winner
2013	Czech International	(Poland) Przemysław Wacha	(Chinese Taipei) Chen Chung-jen (Chinese Taipei) Wang Chi-lin	20–22, 22–20, 21–12	(gold) Winner
2013	Bulgarian International	(Poland) Przemysław Wacha	(Poland) Łukasz Moreń (Poland) Wojciech Szkudlarczyk	16–21, 21–13, 22–24	(silver) Runner-up
2013	Irish Open	(Poland) Przemysław Wacha	(Netherlands) Jacco Arends (Netherlands) Jelle Maas	21–9, 21–6	(gold) Winner
2013	Italian International	(Poland) Przemysław Wacha	(Poland) Łukasz Moreń (Poland) Wojciech Szkudlarczyk	23–21, 21–17	(gold) Winner
2014	Swedish Masters	(Poland) Przemysław Wacha	(Poland) Łukasz Moreń (Poland) Wojciech Szkudlarczyk	21–18, 20–22, 21–15	(gold) Winner
2014	Polish Open	(Poland) Przemysław Wacha	(Russia) Nikita Khakimov (Russia) Vasily Kuznetsov	21–10, 21–11	(gold) Winner
2014	Orléans International	(Poland) Przemysław Wacha	(France) Bastian Kersaudy (France) Gaëtan Mittelheisser	13–21, 21–17, 21–18	(gold) Winner
2014	Spanish Open	(Poland) Przemysław Wacha	(Poland) Łukasz Moreń (Poland) Wojciech Szkudlarczyk	21–9, 15–21, 16–21	(silver) Runner-up
2014	Polish International	(Poland) Przemysław Wacha	(Germany) Daniel Benz (Germany) Jones Ralfy Jansen	11–8, 6–11, 11–5, 8–11, 11–9	(gold) Winner
2014	Czech International	(Poland) Przemysław Wacha	(Poland) Łukasz Moreń (Poland) Wojciech Szkudlarczyk	21–15, 21–15	(gold) Winner
2014	Irish Open	(Poland) Przemysław Wacha	(Germany) Max Schwenger (Germany) Josche Zurwonne	12–21, 21–10, 21–18	(gold) Winner
2015	Swedish Masters	(Poland) Przemysław Wacha	(Denmark) Kim Astrup (Denmark) Anders Skaarup Rasmussen	15–21, 11–21	(silver) Runner-up
2015	Polish Open	(Poland) Przemysław Wacha	(Japan) Kenta Kazuno (Japan) Kazushi Yamada	19–21, 12–21	(silver) Runner-up
2015	Orléans International	(Poland) Przemysław Wacha	(England) Matthew Nottingham (England) Harley Towler	12–21, 18–21	(silver) Runner-up
2015	Peru International	(Poland) Przemysław Wacha	(France) Lucas Claerbout (France) Lucas Corvée	21–18, 21–11	(gold) Winner
2015	Spanish International	(Poland) Przemysław Wacha	(Denmark) Kasper Antonsen (Denmark) Oliver Babic	21–17, 21–14	(gold) Winner
2015	Lagos International	(Poland) Przemysław Wacha	(India) Manu Attri (India) B. Sumeeth Reddy	17–21, 17–21	(silver) Runner-up
2015	Kharkiv International	(Poland) Przemysław Wacha	(Thailand) Bodin Isara (Thailand) Nipitphon Phuangphuapet	18–21, 13–21	(silver) Runner-up
2015	Belgian International	(Poland) Przemysław Wacha	(India) Manu Attri (India) B. Sumeeth Reddy	20–22, 21–19, 20–22	(silver) Runner-up
2015	Czech Open	(Poland) Przemysław Wacha	(India) Manu Attri (India) B. Sumeeth Reddy	19–21, 22–20, 21–14	(gold) Winner
2015	Welsh International	(Poland) Przemysław Wacha	(England) Marcus Ellis (England) Chris Langridge	16–21, 21–16, 16–21	(silver) Runner-up
2015	Irish Open	(Poland) Przemysław Wacha	(Germany) Raphael Beck (Germany) Peter Käsbauer	16–21, 18–21	(silver) Runner-up
2015	Mersin Turkey International	(Poland) Przemysław Wacha	(Denmark) Kasper Antonsen (Denmark) Niclas Nøhr	16–21, 15–21	(silver) Runner-up
2016	Brazil International	(Poland) Przemysław Wacha	(India) Alwin Francis (India) Tarun Kona	21–15, 21–16	(gold) Winner
2016	Finnish Open	(Poland) Przemysław Wacha	(Denmark) Mathias Christiansen (Denmark) David Daugaard	23–21, 12–21, 12–21	(silver) Runner-up
2016	Peru International	(Poland) Przemysław Wacha	(India) Manu Attri (India) B. Sumeeth Reddy	21–19, 18–21, 30–28	(gold) Winner
2016	Tahiti International	(Poland) Przemysław Wacha	(United States) Phillip Chew (United States) Sattawat Pongnairat	9–5 retired	(gold) Winner
2017	Czech Open	(Poland) Miłosz Bochat	(England) Ben Lane (England) Sean Vendy	21–18, 23–21	(gold) Winner
2017	Italian International	(Poland) Miłosz Bochat	(Netherlands) Jelle Maas (Netherlands) Robin Tabeling	21–23, 18–21	(silver) Runner-up
2018	Polish International	(Poland) Miłosz Bochat	(Chinese Taipei) Lin Shang-kai (Chinese Taipei) Tseng Min-hao	13–21, 16–21	(silver) Runner-up
2018	Czech Open	(Poland) Miłosz Bochat	(France) Thom Gicquel (France) Ronan Labar	18–21, 21–17, 15–21	(silver) Runner-up
2018	Hungarian International	(Poland) Miłosz Bochat	(Denmark) David Daugaard (Denmark) Frederik Søgaard	21–15, 12–21, 12–21	(silver) Runner-up
2019	Slovenian International	(Poland) Paweł Pietryja	(Japan) Shohei Hoshino (Japan) Yujiro Nishikawa	9–21, 11–21	(silver) Runner-up

Mixed doubles
Year	Tournament	Partner	Opponent	Score	Result
2005	Slovak International	(Poland) Małgorzata Kurdelska	(Czech Republic) Jan Fröhlich (Czech Republic) Hana Milisová	4–15, 1–15	(silver) Runner-up
2006	Estonian International	(Poland) Małgorzata Kurdelska	(Ukraine) Valeriy Atrashchenkov (Ukraine) Elena Prus	22–20, 21–19	(gold) Winner
2006	Lithuanian International	(Poland) Małgorzata Kurdelska	(Russia) Andrei Ivanov (Russia) Elena Chernyavskaya	21–10, 21–15	(gold) Winner
2007	Croatian International	(Poland) Malgorzata Kurdelska	(Belgium) Wouter Claes (Belgium) Nathalie Descamps	13–21, 21–16, 13–21	(silver) Runner-up
2007	Welsh International	(Poland) Małgorzata Kurdelska	(Netherlands) Jorrit de Ruiter (Netherlands) Ilse Vaessen	21–16, 21–19	(gold) Winner
2009	Polish International	(Poland) Małgorzata Kurdelska	(Poland) Michał Łogosz (Poland) Olga Konon	25–23, 11–21, 7–21	(silver) Runner-up
2009	Bulgarian International	(Poland) Małgorzata Kurdelska	(Poland) Robert Mateusiak (Poland) Nadieżda Kostiuczyk	18–21 9–21	(silver) Runner-up

BWF International Challenge tournament
BWF International Series tournament
