= Taiki Shimada =

Japanese badminton player (born 1992)

Personal information
- Born: 31 July 1992 (age 34) Hokkaido, Japan
- Height: 1.85 m (6 ft 1 in)

Sport
- Country: Japan
- Sport: Badminton

Men's doubles
- Highest ranking: 54 (19 January 2017)
- Current ranking: 64 (29 June 2017)
- BWF profile

Taiki Shimada (島田 大輝, Shimada Taiki; born 31 July 1992) is a Japanese male badminton player from the Yonex team and educated at the Nippon Sport Science University. In 2014, he became the runner-up at the U.S. Open Grand Prix, tournament in men's doubles event partnered with Yoshinori Takeuchi. In 2016, he and Takeuchi also the semi-finalist at the Malaysia International Challenge tournament.

== Achievements ==
=== BWF Grand Prix ===
The BWF Grand Prix has two level such as Grand Prix and Grand Prix Gold. It is a series of badminton tournaments, sanctioned by Badminton World Federation (BWF) since 2007.

Men's Doubles
Year	Tournament	Partner	Opponent	Score	Result	Ref.
2014	U.S. Grand Prix	(Japan) Yoshinori Takeuchi	(Poland) Adam Cwalina (Poland) Przemysław Wacha	13–21, 6–21	(silver) Runner-up	

BWF Grand Prix tournament
