= Hong Jingyu =

Chinese badminton player

Jing Yu Hong 洪静宇
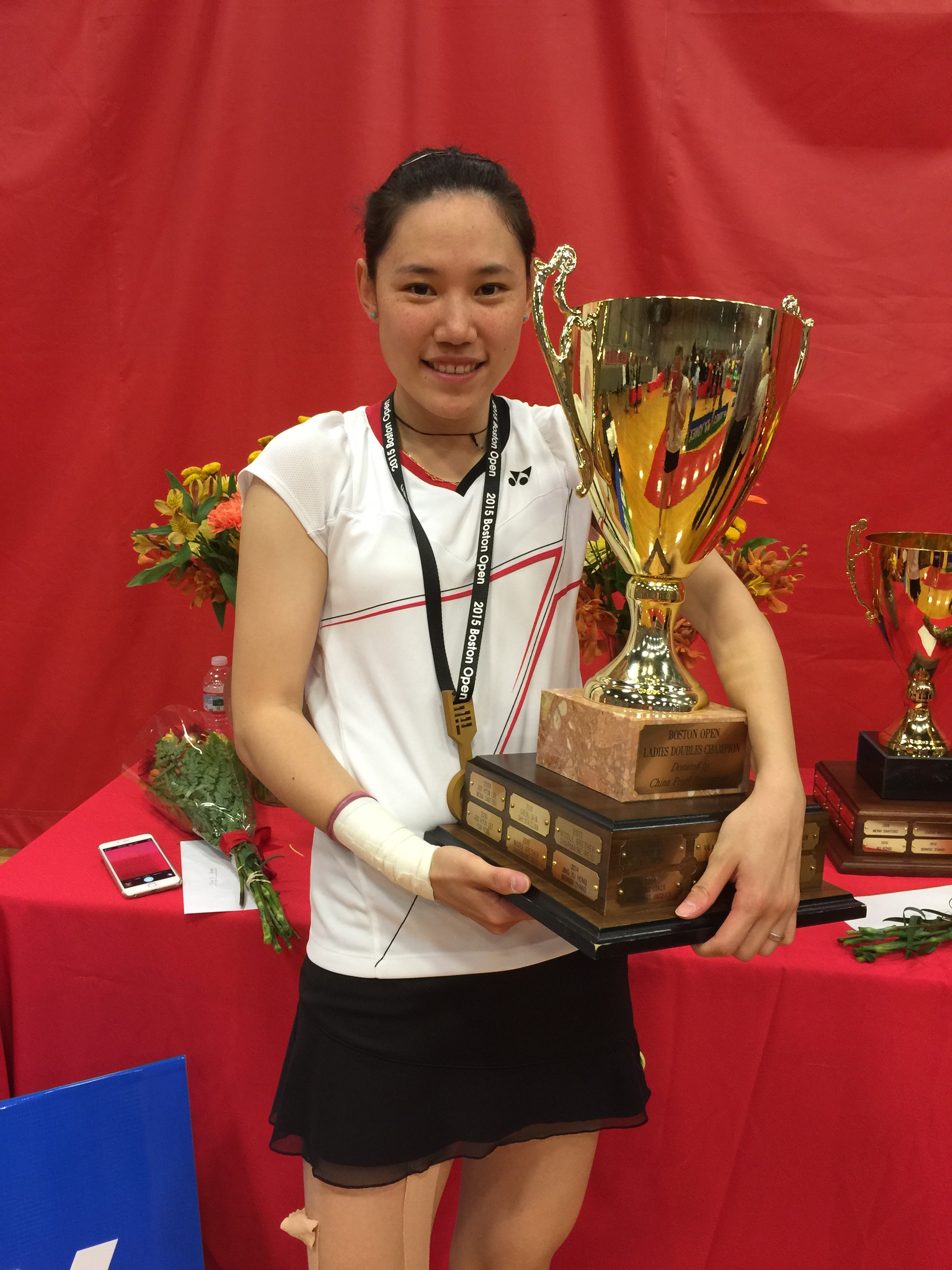
- 1st Place at Boston Open

Personal information
- Born: 洪静宇; 2 July 1984 (age 42) Beijing, China
- Years active: 1993–2018
- Height: 1.68 m (5 ft 6 in)
- Weight: 55 kg (121 lb; 8.7 st)

Sport
- Country: China (2000–2010); United States (2013–present)
- Sport: Badminton
- Handedness: Right

Women's & mixed doubles
- Highest ranking: 116 (WD) Nov 24, 2016; 249 (XD) Aug 27, 2015
- BWF profile

Hong Jingyu (simplified Chinese: 洪静宇; traditional Chinese: 洪靜宇); born 2 July 1984 in Beijing), also known as Jing Yu Hong, is a professional badminton player from China who is a doubles and mixed specialist. She started her badminton career at the age of 9.

At age 11, Hong left home to train full-time at a professional sports center. In 2002, she was recognized for her abilities and was selected for the Chinese National Youth Team. She was later selected for the China National 2nd Tier Team for Women's Doubles. During her time with the National Team, she won recognition and several titles in China's National Team and individual tournaments.

In 2012, Hong joined the EastBay Badminton Association and began representing the United States.

== Achievement ==
=== BWF International Challenge/Series ===
Women's doubles
Year	Tournament	Partner	Opponent	Score	Result
2016	Yonex / K&D Graphics International	(United States) Beiwen Zhang	(United States) Eva Lee (United States) Paula Lynn Obanana	21–17, 22–20	(gold) Winner
2013	USA International	(United States) Beiwen Zhang	(Brazil) Paula Pereira (Brazil) Lohaynny Vicente	21–7, 21–14	(gold) Winner

BWF International Challenge tournament
BWF International Series tournament

Mixed doubles
Year	Tournament	Partner	Opponent	Score	Result
2013	USA International	(United States) Halim Ho	(Canada) Toby Ng (Canada) Michelle Li	16–21, 15–21	(silver) Runner-Up
