= U.S. International =

The U.S. International (officially Yonex / K&D Graphics International) is an open international badminton tournament held in the United States. The tournament was formerly classified as a Grand Prix level event. In 2016, the Badminton World Federation (BWF) reclassified the tournament as an International Challenge event. The 2017 edition featured both International Challenge and International Series events.

While the tournament was historically held in Orange County, California, it is scheduled to return in October 2026 as the Arise International Challenge. This edition will be hosted in Brookshire, Texas, marking the return of the BWF International Challenge to the United States after a hiatus.

== Previous winners ==
Year	Men's singles	Women's singles	Men's doubles	Women's doubles	Mixed doubles
2014	(Chinese Taipei) Hsu Jen-hao	(United States) Beiwen Zhang	(Poland) Adam Cwalina (Poland) Przemysław Wacha	(Chinese Taipei) Hsieh Pei-chen (Chinese Taipei) Wu Ti-jung	(Germany) Peter Käsbauer (Germany) Isabel Herttrich
2015	(South Korea) Lee Hyun-il	(Chinese Taipei) Pai Yu-po	(Malaysia) Goh V Shem (Malaysia) Tan Wee Kiong	(South Korea) Jung Kyung-eun (South Korea) Shin Seung-chan	(South Korea) Choi Sol-gyu (South Korea) Eom Hye-won
2016	(Japan) Riichi Takeshita	(United States) Beiwen Zhang	(Denmark) Frederik Colberg (Denmark) Rasmus Fladberg	(United States) Jing Yu Hong (United States) Beiwen Zhang	(Russia) Evgenij Dremin (Russia) Evgenia Dimova
2017	(Japan) Kento Momota	(United States) Jamie Hsu	(United States) Tony Gunawan (United States) Vinson Chiu	(United States) Annie Xu (United States) Kerry Xu	(Canada) Toby Ng (Canada) Josephine Wu
2017	(Chinese Taipei) Lu Chia-hung	(Japan) Natsuki Nidaira	(England) Marcus Ellis (England) Chris Langridge	(Canada) Rachel Honderich (Canada) Kristen Tsai	(Canada) Nyl Yakura (Canada) Kristen Tsai
2018	(Canada) B.R. Sankeerth	(Japan) Saya Yamamoto	(Canada) Joshua Hurlburt-Yu (Canada) Duncan Yao	(Japan) Akane Araki (Japan) Riko Imai	(Canada) Joshua Hurlburt-Yu (Canada) Josephine Wu
2018	(Japan) Koki Watanabe	(Japan) Aya Ohori	(Chinese Taipei) Lu Chia-hung (Chinese Taipei) Lu Chia-pin	(Canada) Rachel Honderich (Canada) Kristen Tsai	(Japan) Kohei Gondo (Japan) Ayane Kurihara
2019	(Japan) Kodai Naraoka	(Vietnam) Vũ Thị Trang	(Chinese Taipei) Chen Xin-yuan (Chinese Taipei) Lin Yu-chieh	(Australia) Setyana Mapasa (Australia) Gronya Somerville	(Canada) Joshua Hurlburt-Yu (Canada) Josephine Wu
2020– 2025	No competition				
2026 I	(Indonesia) Muhammad Reza Al Fajri	(Chinese Taipei) Huang Ching-ping	(Canada) Kevin Lee (Canada) Ty Alexander Lindeman	(Canada) Jackie Dent (Canada) Crystal Lai	(Brazil) Davi Silva (Brazil) Sânia Lima
2026 II					

BWF Grand Prix
BWF International Challenge
BWF International Series

== Performances by nation ==
As of 2026 I edition

Pos.	Nation	MS	WS	MD	WD	XD	Total
1	Canada	1		2	3	4	10
2	Japan	4	3		1	1	9
3	Chinese Taipei	2	2	2	1		7
4	United States*		3	1	2		6
5	South Korea	1			1	1	3
6	Australia				1		1
6	Brazil					1	1
6	Denmark			1			1
6	England			1			1
6	Germany					1	1
6	Indonesia	1					1
6	Malaysia			1			1
6	Poland			1			1
6	Russia					1	1
6	Vietnam		1				1
Total		9	9	9	9	9	45

* Host nation
