= Phyllis Chan =

Canadian badminton player (born 1991)

Phyllis Chan 陈继怡
Personal information
- Born: July 18, 1991 (age 34)
- Height: 1.69 m (5 ft 7 in)
- Weight: 120 lb (54 kg)

Sport
- Country: Canada
- Sport: Badminton
Medal record
Women's badminton
Representing Canada
Pan American Games
| Bronze medal – third place | 2015 Toronto | Doubles |

Phyllis Kai Yi Chan (born July 18, 1991) is a Canadian badminton player from Vancouver, British Columbia. She has been one of the top ranked women's individual and doubles player on the continent and a contender in major international competitions. She is a national champion in women's doubles with Alex Bruce, and has won several international titles since 2010. She also got married on September 17, 2019.
