= 2018 in badminton =

== International badminton events (Grade 1) ==
- May 20 – 27: 2018 Thomas & Uber Cup (Grade 1) in (Thailand) Bangkok
  - Thomas Cup winners: China
  - Uber Cup winners: Japan
- July 30 – August 5: 2018 BWF World Championships (Grade 1) in Nanjing
  - Singles: (Japan) Kento Momota (m) / (Spain) Carolina Marín (f)
  - Doubles: China (Li Junhui & Liu Yuchen) (m) / Japan (Mayu Matsumoto & Wakana Nagahara) (f)
  - Mixed: China (Zheng Siwei & Huang Yaqiong)
- October 15 – 21: 2018 World University Badminton Championships in (Malaysia) Kuala Lumpur
- November 5 – 18: 2018 BWF World Junior Championships (Individual & Team; Grade 1) in (Canada) Markham, Ontario
  - Singles: (Thailand) Kunlavut Vitidsarn (m) / (Malaysia) Goh Jin Wei (f)
  - Doubles: China (Di Zijian & Wang Chang) (m) / China (Liu Xuanxuan & Xia Yuting) (f)
  - Mixed: Indonesia (Leo Rolly Carnando & Indah Cahya Sari Jamil)
  - Team: China
- December 12 – 16: HSBC BWF World Tour Finals 2018 in Guangzhou
  - Singles: (China) Shi Yuqi (m) / (India) P. V. Sindhu (f)
  - Doubles: China (Li Junhui & Liu Yuchen) (m) / Japan (Misaki Matsutomo & Ayaka Takahashi) (f)
  - Mixed: China (Wang Yilyu & Huang Dongping)

== Continental badminton events ==
- February 6 – 11: 2018 Oceania Badminton Championships in Hamilton, New Zealand
  - Singles: (New Zealand) Abhinav Manota (m) / (Australia) Chen Hsuan-yu (f)
  - Doubles: Australia (Matthew Chau & Sawan Serasinghe) (m) / Australia (Setyana Mapasa & Gronya Somerville) (f)
  - Mixed: Australia (Sawan Serasinghe & Setyana Mapasa)
  - Men's Team: Australia (Anthony Joe, Ashwant Gobinathan, Eric Vuong, Jacob Schueler, Matthew Chau, Pit Seng Low, Raymond Tam, Robin Middleton, Ross Smith, Sawan Serasinghe)
  - Women's Team: Australia (Gronya Somerville, Chen Hsuan-yu, Jennifer Tam, Joy Lai, Leanne Choo, Louisa Ma, Setyana Mapasa)
- February 6 – 11: 2018 Badminton Asia Team Championships in (Malaysia) Alor Setar
  - Men: Indonesia (Mohammad Ahsan, Jonatan Christie, Marcus Fernaldi Gideon, Anthony Sinisuka Ginting, Firman Abdul Kholik, Ihsan Maulana Mustofa, Angga Pratama, Rian Agung Saputro, Hendra Setiawan, Kevin Sanjaya Sukamuljo)
  - Women: Japan (Yuki Fukushima, Sayaka Hirota, Misaki Matsutomo, Aya Ohori, Nozomi Okuhara, Sayaka Sato, Ayaka Takahashi, Shiho Tanaka, Akane Yamaguchi, Koharu Yonemoto)
- February 12 – 15: 2018 All Africa Men's and Women's Team Badminton Championships in Algiers
  - Men: Algeria (Adel Hamek, Adel Meddah, Koceila Mammeri, Majed Yacine Balahoune, Mohamed Abdelaziz Ouchefoun, Mohamed Abderrahime Belarbi, Samy Khaldi, Sifeddine Larbaoui, Youcef Sabri Medel)
  - Women: Mauritius (Aurelie Marie Elisa Allet, Ganesha Mungrah, Kate Foo Kune, Kobita Dookhee, Nicki Chan-Lam, Sendila Mourat)
- February 13 – 18: 2018 European Men's and Women's Team Badminton Championships in (Russia) Kazan
  - Men: Denmark (Anders Antonsen, Mads Conrad-Petersen, Mads Pieler Kolding, Emil Holst, Kim Astrup, Mathias Christiansen, Jan Ø. Jørgensen)
  - Women: Denmark (Mia Blichfeldt, Kamilla Rytter Juhl, Christinna Pedersen, Line Kjaersfeldt, Maiken Fruergaard, Sara Thygesen, Natalia Koch Rohde)
- February 15 – 18: 2018 Pan Am Badminton Championships (Team) in (Trinidad and Tobago) Tacarigua
  - Men: Canada (Austin James Bauer, Paul-Antoine Dostie-Gundon, Jason Ho-shue, Jonathan Lai, Ty Alexander Lindeman, Nyl Yakura, Brian Yang, Duncan Yao)
  - Women: Canada (Anne-Julie Beaulieu, Catherine Choi, Michelle Li, Talia Ng, Stéphanie Pakenham, Brittney Tam, Michelle Tong, Josephine Wu)
- April 24 – 29: 2018 Badminton Asia Championships in Wuhan
  - Singles: (Japan) Kento Momota (m) / (Chinese Taipei) Tai Tzu-ying (f)
  - Doubles: China (Li Junhui & Liu Yuchen) (m) / Japan (Yuki Fukushima & Sayaka Hirota) (f)
  - Mixed: China (Wang Yilyu & Huang Dongping)
- April 24 – 29: 2018 European Badminton Championships in (Spain) Huelva
  - Singles: (Denmark) Viktor Axelsen (m) / (Spain) Carolina Marín (f)
  - Doubles: Denmark (Kim Astrup & Anders Skaarup Rasmussen) (m) / Bulgaria (Gabriela Stoeva & Stefani Stoeva) (f)
  - Mixed: England (Chris Adcock & Gabby Adcock)
- April 26 – 29: 2018 Pan American Badminton Championships in Guatemala City
  - Singles: (Brazil) Ygor Coelho / (Canada) Michelle Li (f)
  - Doubles: Canada (Jason Ho-shue & Nyl Yakura) (m) / Canada (Rachel Honderich & Kristen Tsai) (f)
  - Mixed: Canada (Ty Alexander Lindeman & Josephine Wu)
- July 14 – 22: Badminton Asia Junior Championships 2018 in Jakarta
  - Singles: (India) Lakshya Sen (m) / (China) WANG Zhiyi (f)
  - Doubles: China (DI Zijian & WANG Chang) (m) / Indonesia (Febriana Dwipuji Kusuma & Ribka Sugiarto) (f)
  - Mixed: China (GUO Xinwa & LIU Xuanxuan)
  - Team: China defeated Japan, 3–0 in matches played, in the final. Indonesia & Malaysia took third place.
- July 18 – 26: 2018 Pan Am Junior Badminton Championships in Salvador, Bahia
  - Singles: (Brazil) Jonathan Matias (m) / (Canada) Talia Ng (f)
  - Doubles: United States (Ryan Zheng & Winston Tsai) (m) / Canada (Crystal Lai & Wendy Zhang) (f)
  - Mixed: Canada (Kevin Wang & Wendy Zhang)
  - Team: Canada defeated Brazil, 3–2 in matches played, in the final. United States took third place.
- September 7 – 16: 2018 European Junior Badminton Championships in (Estonia) Tallinn
  - Singles: (France) Arnaud Merkle (m) / (Denmark) Line Christopher (f)
  - Doubles: France (Fabien Delrue & William Villeger) (m) / Turkey (Bengisu Ercetin & Nazlıcan Inci) (f)
  - Mixed: France (Fabien Delrue & Juliette Moinard)
  - Team: France defeated Denmark, 3–2 in matches played, in the final. The semifinal loser teams were Germany & Russia.

== 2018 BWF Season (Grade 2) ==
- January 9 – December 2: 2018 BWF Season

Level Two (Super 1000)

- March 14 – 18: 2018 All England Open in Birmingham
  - Singles: (China) Shi Yuqi (m) / (Chinese Taipei) Tai Tzu-ying (f)
  - Doubles: Indonesia (Marcus Fernaldi Gideon & Kevin Sanjaya Sukamuljo) (m) / Denmark (Kamilla Rytter Juhl & Christinna Pedersen) (f)
  - Mixed: Japan (Yuta Watanabe & Arisa Higashino)
- July 3 – 8: 2018 Indonesia Open in Jakarta
  - Singles: (Japan) Kento Momota (m) / (Chinese Taipei) Tai Tzu-ying (f)
  - Doubles: Indonesia (Marcus Fernaldi Gideon & Kevin Sanjaya Sukamuljo) (m) / Japan (Yuki Fukushima & Sayaka Hirota) (f)
  - Mixed: Indonesia (Tontowi Ahmad & Liliyana Natsir)
- September 18 – 23: 2018 China Open (final) in Changzhou
  - Singles: (Indonesia) Anthony Sinisuka Ginting (m) / (Spain) Carolina Marín (f)
  - Doubles: Denmark (Kim Astrup & Anders Skaarup Rasmussen) (m) / Japan (Misaki Matsutomo & Ayaka Takahashi) (f)
  - Mixed: China (Zheng Siwei & Huang Yaqiong)

Level Three (Super 750)

- June 26 – July 1: Malaysia Open 2018 in Kuala Lumpur
  - Singles: (Malaysia) Lee Chong Wei (m) / (Chinese Taipei) Tai Tzu-ying (f)
  - Doubles: Japan (Takeshi Kamura & Keigo Sonoda) (m) / Japan (Misaki Matsutomo & Ayaka Takahashi) (f)
  - Mixed: China (Zheng Siwei & Huang Yaqiong)
- September 11 – 16: Japan Open 2018 in Tokyo
  - Singles: (Japan) Kento Momota (m) / (Spain) Carolina Marín (f)
  - Doubles: Indonesia (Marcus Fernaldi Gideon & Kevin Sanjaya Sukamuljo) (m) / Japan (Yuki Fukushima & Sayaka Hirota) (f)
  - Mixed: China (Zheng Siwei & Huang Yaqiong)
- October 16 – 21: Denmark Open 2018 in Odense
  - Singles: (Japan) Kento Momota (m) / (Chinese Taipei) Tai Tzu-ying (f)
  - Doubles: Indonesia (Marcus Fernaldi Gideon & Kevin Sanjaya Sukamuljo) (m) / Japan (Yuki Fukushima & Sayaka Hirota) (f)
  - Mixed: China (Zheng Siwei & Huang Yaqiong)
- October 23 – 28: French Open 2018 in (France) Paris
  - Singles: (China) Chen Long (m) / (Japan) Akane Yamaguchi (f)
  - Doubles: China (Han Chengkai & Zhou Haodong) (m) / Japan (Mayu Matsumoto & Wakana Nagahara) (f)
  - Mixed: China (Zheng Siwei & Huang Yaqiong)
- November 6 – 11: China Masters 2018 (final) in Fuzhou
  - Singles: (Japan) Kento Momota (m) / (China) Chen Yufei (f)
  - Doubles: Indonesia (Marcus Fernaldi Gideon & Kevin Sanjaya Sukamuljo) (m) / South Korea (Lee So-hee & Shin Seung-chan) (f)
  - Mixed: China (Zheng Siwei & Huang Yaqiong)

Level Four (Super 500)

- January 16 – 21: 2018 Malaysia Masters in Kuala Lumpur
  - Singles: (Denmark) Viktor Axelsen (m) / (Thailand) Ratchanok Intanon (f)
  - Doubles: Indonesia (Fajar Alfian & Muhammad Rian Ardianto) (m) / Denmark (Kamilla Rytter Juhl & Christinna Pedersen) (f)
  - Mixed: Hong Kong (Tang Chun Man & Tse Ying Suet)
- January 23 – 28: 2018 Indonesia Masters in Jakarta
  - Singles: (Indonesia) Anthony Sinisuka Ginting (m) / (Chinese Taipei) Tai Tzu-ying (f)
  - Doubles: Indonesia (Marcus Fernaldi Gideon & Kevin Sanjaya Sukamuljo) (m) / Japan (Misaki Matsutomo & Ayaka Takahashi) (f)
  - Mixed: China (Zheng Siwei & Huang Yaqiong)
- January 30 – February 4: 2018 India Open in New Delhi
  - Singles: (China) Shi Yuqi (m) / (United States) Zhang Beiwen (f)
  - Doubles: Indonesia (Marcus Fernaldi Gideon & Kevin Sanjaya Sukamuljo) (m) / Indonesia (Greysia Polii & Apriyani Rahayu) (f)
  - Mixed: Denmark (Mathias Christiansen & Christinna Pedersen)
- July 10 – 15: 2018 Thailand Open in Bangkok
  - Singles: (Japan) Kanta Tsuneyama (m) / (Japan) Nozomi Okuhara (f)
  - Doubles: Japan (Takeshi Kamura & Keigo Sonoda) (m) / Indonesia (Greysia Polii & Apriyani Rahayu) (f)
  - Mixed: Indonesia (Hafiz Faizal & Gloria Emanuelle Widjaja)
- July 17 – 22: 2018 Singapore Open in Singapore
  - Singles: (Chinese Taipei) Chou Tien-chen (m) / (Japan) Sayaka Takahashi (f)
  - Doubles: Indonesia (Mohammad Ahsan & Hendra Setiawan) (m) / Japan (Ayako Sakuramoto & Yukiko Takahata) (f)
  - Mixed: Malaysia (Goh Soon Huat & Shevon Jemie Lai)
- September 25 – 30: 2018 Korea Open in (South Korea) Seoul
  - Singles: (Chinese Taipei) Chou Tien-chen (m) / (Japan) Nozomi Okuhara (f)
  - Doubles: Japan (Hiroyuki Endo & Yuta Watanabe) (m) / Japan (Misaki Matsutomo & Ayaka Takahashi) (f)
  - Mixed: China (He Jiting & Du Yue)
- November 13 – 18: 2018 Hong Kong Open (final) in Hong Kong
  - Singles: (South Korea) Son Wan-ho (m) / (Japan) Nozomi Okuhara (f)
  - Doubles: Indonesia (Marcus Fernaldi Gideon & Kevin Sanjaya Sukamuljo) (m) / Japan (Yuki Fukushima & Sayaka Hirota) (f)
  - Mixed: Japan (Yuta Watanabe & Arisa Higashino)

Level Five (Super 300)

- January 9 – 14: 2018 Thailand Masters in Bangkok
  - Singles: (Indonesia) Tommy Sugiarto (m) / (Thailand) Nichaon Jindapon (f)
  - Doubles: Thailand (Tinn Isriyanet & Kittisak Namdash) (m) / Thailand (Jongkolphan Kititharakul & Rawinda Prajongjai) (f)
  - Mixed: Malaysia (Chan Peng Soon & Goh Liu Ying)
- February 20 – 25: 2018 Swiss Open in (Switzerland) Basel
  - Singles: (India) Sameer Verma (m) / (Japan) Sayaka Takahashi (f)
  - Doubles: Denmark (Mathias Boe & Carsten Mogensen) (m) / Japan (Ayako Sakuramoto & Yukiko Takahata) (f)
  - Mixed: Germany (Mark Lamsfuß & Isabel Herttrich)
- March 6 – 11: 2018 German Open in (Germany) Mülheim
  - Singles: (Chinese Taipei) Chou Tien-chen (m) / (Japan) Akane Yamaguchi (f)
  - Doubles: Japan (Takuto Inoue & Yuki Kaneko) (m) / Japan (Yuki Fukushima & Sayaka Hirota) (f)
  - Mixed: Malaysia (Goh Soon Huat & Shevon Jemie Lai)
- May 1 – 6: 2018 New Zealand Open in Auckland
  - Singles: (China) Lin Dan (m) / (Japan) Sayaka Takahashi (f)
  - Doubles: Chinese Taipei (Chen Hung-ling & Wang Chi-lin) (m) / Japan (Ayako Sakuramoto & Yukiko Takahata) (f)
  - Mixed: Chinese Taipei (Wang Chi-lin & Lee Chia-hsin)
- May 8 – 13: 2018 Australian Open in (Australia) Sydney
  - Singles: (China) LU Guangzu (m) / (China) Cai Yanyan (f)
  - Doubles: Indonesia (Berry Angriawan & Hardianto) (m) / Japan (Ayako Sakuramoto & Yukiko Takahata) (f)
  - Mixed: South Korea (Seo Seung-jae & Chae Yoo-jung)
- June 12 – 17: 2018 U.S. Open in (United States) Fullerton
  - Singles: (South Korea) Lee Dong-keun (m) / (China) Li Xuerui (f)
  - Doubles: China (OU Xuanyi & REN Xiangyu) (m) / China (Tang Jinhua & Yu Xiaohan) (f)
  - Mixed: Malaysia (Chan Peng Soon & Goh Liu Ying)
- August 28 – September 2: 2018 Spanish Open in (Spain) Barcelona
  - Singles: (Denmark) Rasmus Gemke (m) / (Japan) Minatsu Mitani (f)
  - Doubles: South Korea (Kim Gi-jung & Lee Yong-dae) (m) / Japan (Mayu Matsumoto & Wakana Nagahara) (f)
  - Mixed: Denmark (Niclas Nøhr & Sara Thygesen)
- October 2 – 7: 2018 Chinese Taipei Open in Taipei
  - Singles: (Malaysia) Lee Zii Jia (m) / (Chinese Taipei) Tai Tzu-ying (f)
  - Doubles: Chinese Taipei (Chen Hung-ling & Wang Chi-lin) (m) / Japan (Nami Matsuyama & Chiharu Shida) (f)
  - Mixed: Indonesia (Alfian Eko Prasetya & Marsheilla Gischa Islami)
- October 30 – November 4: 2018 Macau Open in Macau
  - Singles: (South Korea) Lee Hyun-il (m) / (Canada) Michelle Li (f)
  - Doubles: South Korea (Kim Gi-jung & Lee Yong-dae) (m) / Malaysia (Vivian Hoo Kah Mun & Yap Cheng Wen) (f)
  - Mixed: Hong Kong (Tang Chun Man & Tse Ying Suet)
- November 20 – 25: 2018 Syed Modi International in (India) Lucknow
  - Singles: (India) Sameer Verma (m) / (China) Han Yue (f)
  - Doubles: Indonesia (Fajar Alfian & Muhammad Rian Ardianto) (m) / Malaysia (Chow Mei Kuan & Lee Meng Yean) (f)
  - Mixed: China (OU Xuanyi & Feng Xueying)
- November 27 – December 2: Korea Masters 2018 (final) in Gwangju
  - Singles: (South Korea) Son Wan-ho (m) / (China) Li Xuerui (f)
  - Doubles: South Korea (Choi Sol-gyu & Seo Seung-jae) (m) / South Korea (Chang Ye-na & Jung Kyung-eun) (f)
  - Mixed: South Korea (Ko Sung-hyun & Eom Hye-won)

Level Six (Super 100)

- March 27 – April 1: Orleans Masters 2018 in (France) Orléans
  - Singles: (Netherlands) Mark Caljouw (m) / (Japan) Shiori Saito (f)
  - Doubles: Germany (Mark Lamsfuß & Marvin Emil Seidel) (m) / Bulgaria (Gabriela Stoeva & Stefani Stoeva) (f)
  - Mixed: Denmark (Niclas Nøhr & Sara Thygesen)
- April 10 – 15: Lingshui China Masters in Lingshui
  - Singles: (Chinese Taipei) Lin Yu-hsien (m) / (China) Li Xuerui (f)
  - Doubles: China (Han Chengkai & Zhou Haodong) (m) / China (Du Yue & Li Yinhui) (f)
  - Mixed: China (GUO Xinwa & LIU Xuanxuan)
- June 19 – 24: Canada Open 2018 in Calgary
  - Singles: (China) LU Guangzu (m) / (China) Li Xuerui (f)
  - Doubles: England (Marcus Ellis & Chris Langridge) (m) / Japan (Ayako Sakuramoto & Yukiko Takahata) (f)
  - Mixed: England (Marcus Ellis & Lauren Smith)
- July 24 – 29: Japan Masters 2018 in Akita
  - Singles: (Thailand) Sitthikom Thammasin (m) / (Japan) Sayaka Takahashi (f)
  - Doubles: Indonesia (Akbar Bintang Cahyono & Muhammad Reza Pahlevi Isfahani) (m) / Japan (Ayako Sakuramoto & Yukiko Takahata) (f)
  - Mixed: Japan (Kohei Gondo & Ayane Kurihara)
- July 24 – 29: Russian Open 2018 in (Russia) Vladivostok
  - Singles: (India) Sourabh Verma (m) / (Malaysia) Ho Yen Mei (f)
  - Doubles: Malaysia (Mohamad Arif Abdul Latif & Nur Mohd Azriyn Ayub) (m) / Japan (Chisato Hoshi & Kie Nakanishi) (f)
  - Mixed: (Russia) Vladimir Ivanov & (South Korea) KIM Min-Kyung
- August 7 – 12: Vietnam Open 2018 in Ho Chi Minh City
  - Singles: (Indonesia) Shesar Hiren Rhustavito (m) / (Singapore) Yeo Jia Min (f)
  - Doubles: South Korea (Ko Sung-hyun & Shin Baek-cheol) (m) / Japan (Misato Aratama & Akane Watanabe) (f)
  - Mixed: Thailand (Nipitphon Phuangphuapet & Savitree Amitrapai)
- September 4 – 9: Hyderabad Open in India
  - Singles: (India) Sameer Verma (m) / (South Korea) Kim Ga-eun (f)
  - Doubles: India (Satwiksairaj Rankireddy & Chirag Shetty) (m) / Hong Kong (Ng Tsz Yau & Yuen Sin Ying) (f)
  - Mixed: Indonesia (Akbar Bintang Cahyono & Winny Oktavina Kandow)
- September 18 – 23: 2018 Bangka Belitung Indonesia Masters in Pangkal Pinang
  - Singles: (Indonesia) Ihsan Maulana Mustofa (m) / (Japan) Minatsu Mitani (f)
  - Doubles: Chinese Taipei (Chang Ko-chi & Lu Chia-pin) (m) / Japan (Ayako Sakuramoto & Yukiko Takahata) (f)
  - Mixed: Indonesia (Rinov Rivaldy & Pitha Haningtyas Mentari)
- October 9 – 14: Dutch Open 2018 in (Netherlands) Almere
  - Singles: (India) Sourabh Verma (m) / (Denmark) Mia Blichfeldt (f)
  - Doubles: Indonesia (Wahyu Nayaka & Ade Yusuf) (m) / Bulgaria (Gabriela Stoeva & Stefani Stoeva) (f)
  - Mixed: England (Marcus Ellis & Lauren Smith)
- October 30 – November 4: SaarLorLux 2018 in (Germany) Saarbrücken
  - Singles: (India) Subhankar Dey (m) / (China) Cai Yanyan (f)
  - Doubles: England (Marcus Ellis & Chris Langridge) (m) / Bulgaria (Gabriela Stoeva & Stefani Stoeva) (f)
  - Mixed: England (Marcus Ellis & Lauren Smith)
- November 21 – 25: Scottish Open 2018 (final) in (Scotland) Glasgow
  - Singles: (China) LIU Haichao (m) / (Scotland) Kirsty Gilmour (f)
  - Doubles: England (Marcus Ellis & Chris Langridge) (m) / Bulgaria (Gabriela Stoeva & Stefani Stoeva) (f)
  - Mixed: England (Marcus Ellis & Lauren Smith)

== Leagues ==
- December 23, 2017 – January 14, 2018: 2017-18 Premier Badminton League in India
  - The Hyderabad Hunters defeated the Bengaluru Blasters, 4–3, to win their first Premier Badminton League title.
