= 2019 Sudirman Cup squads =

This article lists the confirmed squad lists for badminton's 2019 Sudirman Cup. The rankings below are based on 5 March 2019 as per stated in prospectus.

== Group 1A ==
=== Japan ===
17 players are scheduled to represent Japan in the 2019 Sudirman Cup.

Name	DoB/Age	MS Rank	WS Rank	MD Rank	WD Rank	XD Rank
Hiroyuki Endo	16 December 1986 (aged 32)	-	-	4	-	-
Yuki Fukushima	6 May 1993 (aged 26)	-	-	-	1	-
Arisa Higashino	1 August 1996 (aged 22)	-	-	-	206	3
Sayaka Hirota	1 August 1994 (aged 24)	-	-	-	1	-
Takuro Hoki	14 August 1995 (aged 23)	-	-	27	-	44
Takeshi Kamura	14 February 1990 (aged 29)	-	-	3	-	-
Yugo Kobayashi	10 July 1995 (aged 23)	-	-	27	-	70
Mayu Matsumoto	7 August 1995 (aged 23)	-	-	-	3	149
Misaki Matsutomo	8 February 1992 (aged 27)	-	-	-	2	52
Kento Momota	1 September 1994 (aged 24)	1	-	-	-	-
Wakana Nagahara	9 January 1996 (aged 23)	-	-	-	3	44
Kenta Nishimoto	30 August 1994 (aged 24)	10	-	-	-	-
Nozomi Okuhara	13 March 1995 (aged 24)	-	2	-	-	-
Keigo Sonoda	20 February 1990 (aged 29)	-	-	3	-	-
Ayaka Takahashi	19 April 1990 (aged 29)	-	-	-	2	-
Yuta Watanabe	13 June 1997 (aged 21)	-	-	4	-	3
Akane Yamaguchi	6 June 1997 (aged 21)	-	5	-	-	-

=== Thailand ===
16 players are scheduled to represent Thailand in the 2019 Sudirman Cup.

Name	DoB/Age	MS Rank	WS Rank	MD Rank	WD Rank	XD Rank
Savitree Amitrapai	19 November 1988 (aged 30)	-	-	-	83	18
Pornpawee Chochuwong	22 January 1998 (aged 21)	-	23	-	-	-
Ratchanok Intanon	5 February 1995 (aged 24)	-	8	-	-	-
Tinn Isriyanet	7 July 1993 (aged 25)	-	-	36	-	186
Kittinupong Kedren	19 July 1996 (aged 22)	-	-	40	-	-
Jongkolphan Kititharakul	1 March 1993 (aged 26)	-	-	-	9	279
Kittisak Namdash	4 August 1995 (aged 23)	-	-	36	-	-
Busanan Ongbamrungphan	22 March 1996 (aged 23)	-	26	-	-	-
Khosit Phetpradab	8 July 1994 (aged 24)	16	-	-	-	-
Nipitphon Phuangphuapet	31 May 1991 (aged 27)	-	-	73	-	18
Rawinda Prajongjai	29 June 1993 (aged 25)	-	-	-	9	-
Dechapol Puavaranukroh	20 May 1997 (aged 21)	-	-	40	-	4
Puttita Supajirakul	29 March 1996 (aged 23)	-	-	-	35	157
Sapsiree Taerattanachai	18 April 1992 (aged 27)	-	-	-	35	4
Sitthikom Thammasin	7 April 1995 (aged 24)	37	-	-	-	-
Kantaphon Wangcharoen	18 September 1998 (aged 20)	18	-	-	-	-

=== Russia ===
10 players are scheduled to represent Russia in the 2019 Sudirman Cup.

Name	DoB/Age	MS Rank	WS Rank	MD Rank	WD Rank	XD Rank
Rodion Alimov	21 April 1998 (aged 21)	-	-	130	-	35
Ekaterina Bolotova	12 December 1992 (aged 26)	-	-	-	22	64
Alina Davletova	18 July 1998 (aged 20)	-	-	-	22	35
Evgenia Dimova	29 April 1982 (aged 37)	-	-	-	-	29
Evgenij Dremin	24 February 1981 (aged 38)	-	-	102	-	29
Vladimir Ivanov	3 July 1987 (aged 31)	-	-	23	-	193
Evgeniya Kosetskaya	16 November 1994 (aged 24)	-	34	-	-	-
Vladimir Malkov	9 April 1986 (aged 33)	62	-	-	-	-
Natalia Perminova	14 November 1991 (aged 27)	-	89	-	-	324
Ivan Sozonov	6 July 1989 (aged 29)	-	-	23	-	-

== Group 1B ==
=== Indonesia ===
20 players are scheduled to represent Indonesia in the 2019 Sudirman Cup.

Name	DoB/Age	MS Rank	WS Rank	MD Rank	WD Rank	XD Rank
Tontowi Ahmad	18 July 1987 (aged 31)	-	-	-	-	164
Mohammad Ahsan	7 September 1987 (aged 31)	-	-	7	-	-
Fajar Alfian	7 March 1995 (aged 24)	-	-	9	-	-
Muhammad Rian Ardianto	13 February 1996 (aged 23)	-	-	9	-	-
Jonatan Christie	15 September 1997 (aged 21)	9	-	-	-	-
Hafiz Faizal	23 September 1994 (aged 24)	-	-	-	-	10
Fitriani	27 December 1996 (aged 22)	-	28	-	-	-
Marcus Fernaldi Gideon	9 March 1991 (aged 28)	-	-	1	-	-
Anthony Sinisuka Ginting	20 October 1996 (aged 22)	7	-	-	-	-
Ni Ketut Mahadewi Istirani	12 September 1994 (aged 24)	-	-	-	43	-
Praveen Jordan	26 April 1993 (aged 26)	-	-	-	-	15
Winny Oktavina Kandow	14 October 1998 (aged 20)	-	-	-	149	164
Melati Daeva Oktavianti	26 October 1994 (aged 24)	-	-	-	-	15
Greysia Polii	11 August 1987 (aged 31)	-	-	-	4	-
Apriyani Rahayu	29 April 1998 (aged 21)	-	-	-	4	-
Shesar Hiren Rhustavito	3 March 1994 (aged 25)	49	-	-	-	-
Hendra Setiawan	25 August 1984 (aged 34)	-	-	7		-
Kevin Sanjaya Sukamuljo	2 August 1995 (aged 23)	-	-	1	-	-
Gregoria Mariska Tunjung	11 August 1999 (aged 19)	-	15	-	-	-
Gloria Emanuelle Widjaja	28 November 1993 (aged 25)	-	-	-	-	10

=== Denmark ===
13 players are scheduled to represent Denmark in the 2019 Sudirman Cup.

Name	DoB/Age	MS Rank	WS Rank	MD Rank	WD Rank	XD Rank
Anders Antonsen	27 April 1997 (aged 22)	13	-	-	-	-
Kim Astrup	6 March 1992 (aged 27)	-	-	6	-	-
Viktor Axelsen	4 January 1994 (aged 25)	6	-	-	-	-
Mia Blichfeldt	19 August 1997 (aged 21)	-	17	-	-	-
Alexandra Bøje	6 December 1999 (aged 19)	-	-	-	105	45
Mathias Boe	11 July 1980 (aged 38)	-	-	22	-	-
Mathias Christiansen	20 February 1994 (aged 25)	-	-	82	-	11
Maiken Fruergaard	11 May 1995 (aged 24)	-	-	-	16	-
Line Kjærsfeldt	20 April 1994 (aged 25)	-	19	-	-	-
Niclas Nøhr	2 August 1991 (aged 27)	-	-	95	-	32
Anders Skaarup Rasmussen	15 February 1989 (aged 30)	-	-	6	-	-
Rikke Søby Hansen	1 February 1995 (aged 24)	-	-	-	84	100
Sara Thygesen	20 January 1991 (aged 28)	-	-	-	16	32

=== England ===
8 players are scheduled to represent England in the 2019 Sudirman Cup.

Name	DoB/Age	MS Rank	WS Rank	MD Rank	WD Rank	XD Rank
Chris Adcock	27 April 1989 (aged 30)	-	-	1376	-	6
Gabby Adcock	30 September 1990 (aged 28)	-	-	-	-	6
Chloe Birch	16 September 1995 (aged 23)	-	43	-	33	-
Marcus Ellis	14 September 1989 (aged 29)	-	-	19	-	12
Abigail Holden	29 August 1999 (aged 19)	-	154	-	158	1252
Chris Langridge	2 May 1985 (aged 34)	-	-	19	-	-
Toby Penty	12 August 1992 (aged 26)	63	-	-	-	-
Lauren Smith	26 September 1991 (aged 27)	-	-	-	33	12

== Group 1C ==
=== Chinese Taipei ===
18 players are scheduled to represent Chinese Taipei in the 2019 Sudirman Cup.

Name	DoB/Age	MS Rank	WS Rank	MD Rank	WD Rank	XD Rank
Chang Ching-hui	17 May 1996 (aged 23)	-	-	-	56	59
Chen Su-yu	19 December 1997 (aged 21)	-	69	-	139	-
Chou Tien-chen	8 January 1990 (aged 29)	3	-	-	-	-
Hsieh Pei-shan	22 November 1997 (aged 21)	-	-	-	143	174
Lee Yang	12 August 1995 (aged 23)	-	-	127	-	31
Liang Ting-yu	3 January 1998 (aged 21)	-	83	-	450	565
Liao Min-chun	27 January 1998 (aged 21)	-	-	11	-	89
Lu Ching-yao	7 June 1993 (aged 25)	-	-	25	-	85
Pai Yu-po	18 April 1994 (aged 25)	-	45	-	125	-
Su Ching-heng	10 November 1992 (aged 26)	-	-	11	-	512
Tai Tzu-ying	20 June 1994 (aged 24)	-	1	-	-	-
Tseng Min-hao	15 June 1998 (aged 20)	-	-	62	-	164
Wang Chi-lin	18 January 1995 (aged 24)	-	-	127	-	16
Wang Tzu-wei	27 February 1995 (aged 24)	28	-	-	-	-
Wu Ti-jung	23 February 1993 (aged 26)	-	-	-	26	132
Yang Chih-chieh	10 December 1991 (aged 27)	85	-	-	-	-
Yang Ching-tun	17 November 1995 (aged 23)	-	-	-	56	177
Yang Po-han	13 March 1994 (aged 25)	-	-	25	-	-

=== South Korea ===
14 players are scheduled to represent South Korea in the 2019 Sudirman Cup.

Name	DoB/Age	MS Rank	WS Rank	MD Rank	WD Rank	XD Rank
An Se-young	5 February 2002 (aged 17)	-	95	-	332	-
Chae Yoo-jung	9 May 1995 (aged 24)	-	-	-	107	7
Chang Ye-na	13 December 1989 (aged 29)	-	-	-	14	277
Choi Sol-gyu	5 August 1995 (aged 23)	-	-	42	-	113
Heo Kwang-hee	11 August 1995 (aged 23)	47	-	-	-	-
Kang Min-hyuk	17 February 1999 (aged 20)	-	-	33	-	243
Kim Ga-eun	7 February 1998 (aged 21)	-	39	-	-	-
Kim Won-ho	2 June 1999 (aged 19)	-	-	33	-	87
Kim So-yeong	9 July 1992 (aged 26)	-	-	-	23	168
Kong Hee-yong	11 December 1996 (aged 22)	-	-	-	23	192
Lee Dong-keun	20 November 1990 (aged 28)	22	-	-	-	-
Na Sung-seung	28 August 1999 (aged 19)	-	-	352	-	-
Seo Seung-jae	4 September 1997 (aged 21)	-	-	42	-	7
Shin Seung-chan	6 December 1994 (aged 24)	-	-	-	6	113

=== Hong Kong ===
16 players are scheduled to represent Hong Kong in the 2019 Sudirman Cup.

Name	DoB/Age	MS Rank	WS Rank	MD Rank	WD Rank	XD Rank
Chau Hoi Wah	5 June 1986 (aged 32)	-	-	-	-	24
Cheung Ngan Yi	27 April 1993 (aged 26)	-	30	-	-	-
Law Cheuk Him	26 June 1994 (aged 24)	-	-	348	-	-
Lee Cheuk Yiu	28 August 1996 (aged 22)	35	-	-	-	-
Ng Ka Long	24 June 1994 (aged 24)	15	-	-	-	-
Ng Tsz Yau	24 April 1998 (aged 21)	-	-	-	29	107
Ng Wing Yung	17 May 1995 (aged 24)	-	-	39	-	36
Or Chin Chung	26 October 1994 (aged 24)	-	-	198	-	-
Tam Chun Hei	2 August 1993 (aged 25)	-	-	60	-	176
Tang Chun Man	20 March 1995 (aged 24)	-	-	198	-	9
Tse Ying Suet	9 November 1991 (aged 27)	-	-	-	-	9
Yeung Nga Ting	13 October 1998 (aged 20)	-	-	-	39	55
Yeung Shing Choi	21 March 1996 (aged 23)	-	-	164	-	154
Yip Pui Yin	6 August 1987 (aged 31)	-	37	-	-	-
Yonny Chung	2 May 1997 (aged 22)	-	-	60	-	129
Yuen Sin Ying	13 January 1994 (aged 25)	-	-	-	29	114

== Group 1D ==
=== China ===
20 players are scheduled to represent China in the 2019 Sudirman Cup.

Name	DoB/Age	MS Rank	WS Rank	MD Rank	WD Rank	XD Rank
Chen Long	18 January 1989 (aged 30)	4	-	-	-	-
Chen Qingchen	23 June 1997 (aged 21)	-	-	-	5	-
Chen Yufei	1 March 1998 (aged 21)	-	4	-	-	-
Du Yue	15 February 1998 (aged 21)	-	-	-	10	13
Han Chengkai	29 January 1998 (aged 21)	-	-	8	-	-
Han Yue	18 November 1999 (aged 19)	-	14	-	-	-
He Bingjiao	21 March 1997 (aged 22)	-	7	-	-	-
He Jiting	19 February 1998 (aged 21)	-	-	13	-	13
Huang Dongping	20 January 1995 (aged 24)	-	-	-	48	2
Huang Yaqiong	28 February 1994 (aged 25)	-	-	-	146	1
Jia Yifan	29 June 1997 (aged 21)	-	-	-	5	-
Li Junhui	10 May 1995 (aged 24)	-	-	2	-	-
Li Yinhui	11 March 1997 (aged 22)	-	-	-	10	8
Liu Yuchen	25 July 1995 (aged 23)	-	-	2	-	-
Lu Guangzu	19 October 1996 (aged 22)	20	-	-	-	-
Shi Yuqi	28 February 1996 (aged 23)	2	-	-	-	-
Wang Yilü	8 November 1994 (aged 24)	-	-	61	-	2
Zheng Siwei	26 February 1997 (aged 22)	-	-	335	-	1
Zheng Yu	7 February 1996 (aged 23)	-	-	-	37	996
Zhou Haodong	20 February 1998 (aged 21)	-	-	8	-	-

=== India ===
13 players are scheduled to represent India in the 2019 Sudirman Cup.

Name	DoB/Age	MS Rank	WS Rank	MD Rank	WD Rank	XD Rank
Manu Attri	31 December 1992 (aged 26)	-	-	26	-	252
Pranav Chopra	6 September 1992 (aged 26)	-	-	-	-	30
Meghana Jakkampudi	28 December 1995 (aged 23)	-	-	-	34	199
Srikanth Kidambi	7 February 1993 (aged 26)	8	-	-	-	-
Saina Nehwal	17 March 1990 (aged 29)	-	9	-	-	-
Ashwini Ponnappa	18 September 1989 (aged 29)	-	-	-	25	25
Poorvisha S. Ram	24 January 1995 (aged 24)	-	-	-	34	93
Satwiksairaj Rankireddy	13 August 2000 (aged 18)	-	-	20	-	25
N. Sikki Reddy	18 August 1993 (aged 25)	-	-	-	25	30
B. Sumeeth Reddy	26 September 1991 (aged 27)	-	-	26	-	181
Chirag Shetty	4 July 1997 (aged 21)	-	-	20	-	-
P. V. Sindhu	5 July 1995 (aged 23)	-	6	-	-	-
Sameer Verma	22 October 1994 (aged 24)	14	-	-	-	-

=== Malaysia ===
20 players are scheduled to represent Malaysia in the 2019 Sudirman Cup.

Name	DoB/Age	MS Rank	WS Rank	MD Rank	WD Rank	XD Rank
Soniia Cheah Su Ya	19 June 1993 (aged 25)	-	36	-	-	-
Cheam June Wei	23 January 1997 (aged 22)	73	-	-	-	-
Chen Tang Jie	5 January 1998 (aged 21)	-	-	176	-	37
Aaron Chia	24 February 1997 (aged 22)	-	-	18	-	-
Chow Mei Kuan	23 December 1994 (aged 24)	-	-	-	17	-
Goh Jin Wei	30 January 2000 (aged 19)	-	24	-	-	-
Vivian Hoo Kah Mun	19 March 1990 (aged 29)	-	-	-	20	-
Goh Soon Huat	27 June 1990 (aged 28)	-	-	328	-	14
Nur Izzuddin	11 November 1997 (aged 21)	-	-	39	-	-
Lai Pei Jing	8 August 1992 (aged 26)	-	-	-	-	38
Shevon Jemie Lai	8 August 1993 (aged 25)	-	-	-	-	14
Lee Meng Yean	30 March 1994 (aged 25)	-	-	-	17	-
Lee Ying Ying	25 October 1997 (aged 21)	-	57	-	-	-
Lee Zii Jia	29 March 1998 (aged 21)	21	-	-	-	-
Ong Yew Sin	30 January 1995 (aged 24)	-	-	21	-	-
Soh Wooi Yik	17 February 1998 (aged 21)	-	-	18	-	-
Soong Joo Ven	19 May 1995 (aged 24)	75	-	-	-	-
Tan Kian Meng	1 June 1994 (aged 24)	-	-	-	-	38
Teo Ee Yi	4 April 1993 (aged 26)	-	-	21	-	-
Yap Cheng Wen	4 January 1995 (aged 24)	-	-	-	20	-

== Group 2A ==
=== Netherlands ===
8 players are scheduled to represent Netherlands in the 2019 Sudirman Cup.

Name	DoB/Age	MS Rank	WS Rank	MD Rank	WD Rank	XD Rank
Jacco Arends	28 January 1991 (aged 28)	-	-	43	-	28
Mark Caljouw	25 January 1995 (aged 24)	29	-	-	-	-
Ruben Jille	11 July 1996 (aged 22)	-	-	43	-	106
Jelle Maas	19 February 1991 (aged 28)	-	-	30	-	326
Gayle Mahulette	17 April 1993 (aged 26)	-	88	-	-	-
Selena Piek	30 September 1991 (aged 27)	-	-	-	18	28
Cheryl Seinen	4 August 1995 (aged 23)	-	-	-	18	41
Robin Tabeling	24 April 1994 (aged 25)	-	-	30	-	41

=== France ===
10 players are scheduled to represent France in the 2019 Sudirman Cup.

Name	DoB/Age	MS Rank	WS Rank	MD Rank	WD Rank	XD Rank
Marie Batomene	10 March 1995 (aged 24)	-	124	-	-	-
Delphine Delrue	6 November 1998 (aged 20)	-	-	-	27	48
Thom Gicquel	12 January 1999 (aged 20)	-	-	55	-	48
Yaëlle Hoyaux	1 February 1998 (aged 21)	-	141	-	-	-
Ronan Labar	3 May 1989 (aged 30)	-	-	55	-	40
Émilie Lefel	25 August 1988 (aged 30)	-	-	-	19	266
Brice Leverdez	9 April 1986 (aged 33)	25	-	-	-	-
Léa Palermo	7 July 1994 (aged 24)	-	-	-	27	115
Thomas Rouxel	26 May 1991 (aged 27)	58	-	-	-	-
Anne Tran	27 April 1996 (aged 23)	-	-	-	19	120

=== United States ===
10 players are scheduled to represent United States in the 2019 Sudirman Cup.

Name	DoB/Age	MS Rank	WS Rank	MD Rank	WD Rank	XD Rank
Angela Zhang	12 June 1997 (aged 21)	-	590	-	183	247
Breanna Chi	30 January 2001 (aged 18)	-	-	-	183	283
Howard Shu	28 November 1990 (aged 28)	382	-	-	-	201
Iris Wang	2 September 1994 (aged 24)	-	147	-	-	-
Jennie Gai	25 February 2001 (aged 18)	-	109	-	197	-
Phillip Chew	16 May 1994 (aged 25)	-	-	47	-	127
Paula Lynn Obañana	19 March 1985 (aged 34)	-	-	-	160	201
Ryan Chew	12 August 1996 (aged 22)	-	-	47	-	139
Timothy Lam	24 August 1997 (aged 21)	159	-	-	-	-
Vinson Chiu	8 August 1998 (aged 20)	433	-	275	-	251

=== Vietnam ===
10 players are scheduled to represent Vietnam in the 2019 Sudirman Cup.

Name	DoB/Age	MS Rank	WS Rank	MD Rank	WD Rank	XD Rank
Đinh Thị Phương Hồng	23 February 1995 (aged 24)	-	439	-	320	-
Đỗ Tuấn Đức	6 February 1996 (aged 23)	-	-	90	-	42
Lê Đức Phát	1 February 1998 (aged 21)	224	-	-	-	-
Nguyễn Hải Đăng	24 September 2000 (aged 18)	779	-	-	-	-
Nguyễn Tiến Minh	12 February 1983 (aged 36)	64	-	-	-	-
Nguyễn Thùy Linh	20 November 1997 (aged 21)	-	52	-	462	-
Phạm Cao Cường	30 May 1996 (aged 22)	84	-	-	-	-
Phạm Như Thảo	30 May 1996 (aged 22)	-	-	-	-	42
Vũ Thị Trang	19 May 1992 (aged 27)	-	59	-	443	-

== Group 2B ==
=== Germany ===
12 players are scheduled to represent Germany in the 2019 Sudirman Cup.

Name	DoB/Age	MS Rank	WS Rank	MD Rank	WD Rank	XD Rank
Alexander Roovers	17 March 1987 (aged 32)	82	-	-	-	-
Fabienne Deprez	8 February 1992 (aged 27)	-	82	-	-	-
Isabel Herttrich	17 March 1992 (aged 27)	-	-	-	44	20
Johanna Goliszewski	5 September 1986 (aged 32)	-	-	-	36	143
Jones Ralfy Jansen	28 April 1992 (aged 27)	-	-	37	-	142
Kai Schäfer	13 June 1993 (aged 25)	110	-	-	-	-
Lara Käpplein	25 May 1995 (aged 23)	-	-	-	36	249
Linda Efler	23 January 1995 (aged 24)	-	-	-	44	22
Mark Lamsfuß	19 April 1994 (aged 25)	-	-	28	-	20
Marvin Emil Seidel	9 November 1995 (aged 23)	-	-	28	-	22
Peter Käsbauer	17 March 1988 (aged 31)	-	-	143	-	54
Yvonne Li	30 May 1998 (aged 20)	-	44	-	-	-

=== Canada ===
11 players are scheduled to represent Canada in the 2019 Sudirman Cup.

Name	DoB/Age	MS Rank	WS Rank	MD Rank	WD Rank	XD Rank
B. R. Sankeerth	22 December 1997 (aged 21)	188	-	662	-	632
Brian Yang	25 November 2001 (aged 17)	200	-	-	-	366
Brittney Tam	23 August 1997 (aged 21)	-	74	-	-	283
Duncan Yao	14 September 1995 (aged 23)	-	-	86	-	285
Josephine Wu	20 January 1995 (aged 24)	-	434	-	100	78
Jason Ho-shue	28 August 1998 (aged 20)	68	-	34	-	-
Joshua Hurlburt-Yu	28 December 1994 (aged 24)	531	-	86	-	78
Kristen Tsai	11 July 1995 (aged 23)	-	-	-	30	76
Michelle Li	3 November 1991 (aged 27)	-	13	-	-	-
Nyl Yakura	14 February 1993 (aged 26)	-	-	34	-	76
Rachel Honderich	21 April 1996 (aged 23)	-	40	-	30	683

=== Singapore ===
11 players are scheduled to represent Singapore in the 2019 Sudirman Cup.

Name	DoB/Age	MS Rank	WS Rank	MD Rank	WD Rank	XD Rank
Crystal Wong	2 August 1999 (aged 19)	-	-	-	318	66
Danny Bawa Chrisnanta	30 December 1988 (aged 30)	-	-	71	-	66
Jaslyn Hooi	5 October 2000 (aged 18)	-	235	-	318	-
Jin Yujia	6 February 1997 (aged 22)	-	-	-	62	75
Joel Koh	23 November 2000 (aged 18)	290	-	-	-	-
Lim Ming Hui	5 December 1999 (aged 19)	-	754	-	212	470
Loh Kean Hean	12 March 1995 (aged 24)	-	-	174	-	-
Loh Kean Yew	26 June 1997 (aged 21)	61	-	-	-	-
Tan Wei Han	16 July 1993 (aged 25)	-	-	-	-	91
Toh Han Zhuo	22 December 2000 (aged 18)	-	-	358	-	1388
Yeo Jia Min	1 February 1999 (aged 20)	-	33	-	-	-

=== Israel ===
9 players are scheduled to represent Israel in the 2019 Sudirman Cup.

Name	DoB/Age	MS Rank	WS Rank	MD Rank	WD Rank	XD Rank
Ariel Shainski	2 April 1993 (aged 26)	821	-	1394	-	733
Ksenia Polikarpova	11 March 1990 (aged 29)	-	63	-	-	233
Margeret Lurie	22 April 1999 (aged 20)	-	910	-	-	1029
Maxim Grinblat	3 March 2001 (aged 18)	1006	-	738	-	1089
May Bar Netzer	5 April 2000 (aged 19)	795	-	738	-	1029
Misha Zilberman	30 January 1989 (aged 30)	50	-	-	-	65
Shery Rotshtein	3 November 2000 (aged 18)	-	699	-	367	1029
Svetlana Zilberman	10 May 1958 (aged 61)	-	-	-	-	65
Yuval Pugach	15 November 2001 (aged 17)	-	561	-	367	733

== Group 3A ==
=== Ireland ===
5 players are scheduled to represent Ireland in the 2019 Sudirman Cup.

Name	DoB/Age	MS Rank	WS Rank	MD Rank	WD Rank	XD Rank
Chloe Magee	29 October 1987 (aged 31)	-	-	-	989	39
Kate Frost	9 November 1998 (aged 20)	-	694	-	235	-
Nhat Nguyen	16 June 2000 (aged 18)	103	-	328	-	-
Rachael Darragh	24 September 1997 (aged 21)	-	198	-	147	153
Sam Magee	9 January 1990 (aged 29)	-	-	1419	-	39

=== Australia ===
9 players are scheduled to represent Australia in the 2019 Sudirman Cup.

Name	DoB/Age	MS Rank	WS Rank	MD Rank	WD Rank	XD Rank
Ashwant Gobinathan	8 September 1993 (aged 25)	392	-	541	-	782
Eric Vuong	21 June 1995 (aged 23)	-	-	234	-	317
Gronya Somerville	10 May 1995 (aged 24)	-	-	-	90	151
Jacob Schueler	17 February 1998 (aged 21)	456	-	317	-	409
Louisa Ma	26 November 1994 (aged 24)	-	175	-	198	349
Sawan Serasinghe	21 February 1994 (aged 25)	-	-	234	-	294
Setyana Mapasa	15 August 1995 (aged 23)	-	-	-	90	338
Simon Leung	24 November 1996 (aged 22)	-	-	91	-	151
Tiffany Ho	6 January 1998 (aged 21)	-	382	-	395	-

=== New Zealand ===
8 players are scheduled to represent New Zealand in the 2019 Sudirman Cup.

Name	DoB/Age	MS Rank	WS Rank	MD Rank	WD Rank	XD Rank
Abhinav Manota	7 April 1992 (aged 27)	138	-	295	-	300
Alyssa Tagle	27 August 1999 (aged 19)	-	-	-	131	512
Anona Pak	29 November 1993 (aged 25)	-	-	-	135	204
Dacmen Vong	16 April 2000 (aged 19)	869	-	328	-	512
Edward Lau	22 February 2001 (aged 18)	-	-	-	-	-
Justine Villegas	22 December 1995 (aged 23)	-	542	-	299	300
Oliver Leydon-Davis	10 May 1990 (aged 29)	-	-	295	-	409
Sally Fu	4 August 1999 (aged 19)	-	213	-	131	-

=== Nepal ===
4 players are scheduled to represent Nepal in the 2019 Sudirman Cup.

Name	DoB/Age	MS Rank	WS Rank	MD Rank	WD Rank	XD Rank
Amita Giri	26 February 1993 (aged 26)	-	482	-	395	409
Dipesh Dhami	18 January 1997 (aged 22)	557	-	152	-	409
Nangsal Tamang	28 December 1987 (aged 31)	-	239	-	395	272
Ratnajit Tamang	1 January 1993 (aged 26)	225	-	152	-	272

== Group 3B ==
=== Switzerland ===
7 players are scheduled to represent Switzerland in the 2019 Sudirman Cup.

Name	DoB/Age	MS Rank	WS Rank	MD Rank	WD Rank	XD Rank
Céline Burkart	25 April 1995 (aged 24)	-	-	-	209	62
Christian Kirchmayr	19 January 1994 (aged 25)	157	-	-	-	-
Jenjira Stadelmann	20 November 1999 (aged 19)	-	457	-	209	553
Oliver Schaller	15 August 1994 (aged 24)	-	-	1440	-	62
Ronja Stern	29 June 1997 (aged 21)	-	130	-	-	-
Sabrina Jaquet	21 June 1987 (aged 31)	-	53	-	1017	-
Tobias Künzi	18 February 1998 (aged 21)	203	-	1440	-	-

=== Sri Lanka ===
6 players are scheduled to represent Sri Lanka in the 2019 Sudirman Cup.

Name	DoB/Age	MS Rank	WS Rank	MD Rank	WD Rank	XD Rank
Buwaneka Goonethilleka	8 May 1996 (aged 23)	641	-	191	-	-
Dilmi Dias	4 May 2001 (aged 18)	-	-	-	-	-
Dinuka Karunaratne	6 October 1987 (aged 31)	171	-	137	-	-
Kavidi Sirimannage	27 September 1995 (aged 23)	-	209	-	128	-
Sachin Dias	18 July 1996 (aged 22)	-	-	191	-	232
Thilini Pramodika Hendahewa	18 September 1996 (aged 22)	-	257	-	128	232

=== Slovakia ===
6 players are scheduled to represent Slovakia in the 2019 Sudirman Cup.

Name	DoB/Age	MS Rank	WS Rank	MD Rank	WD Rank	XD Rank
Andrej Antoška	12 January 2002 (aged 17)	-	-	751	-	1448
Jakub Horák	15 August 2001 (aged 17)	-	-	751	-	1029
Juraj Vachálek	31 October 1990 (aged 28)	1711	-	408	-	1293
Martina Repiská	21 October 1995 (aged 23)	-	85	-	947	104
Mia Tarcalová	26 September 2001 (aged 17)	-	-	-	947	1029
Milan Dratva	24 April 1996 (aged 23)	221	-	245	-	104

=== Lithuania ===
4 players are scheduled to represent Lithuania in the 2019 Sudirman Cup.

Name	DoB/Age	MS Rank	WS Rank	MD Rank	WD Rank	XD Rank
Gerda Voitechovskaja	15 May 1991 (aged 28)	-	217	-	89	-
Mark Šames	29 October 1999 (aged 19)	567	-	1193	-	267
Povilas Bartušis	1 September 1993 (aged 25)	1545	-	-	-	-
Vytautė Fomkinaitė	12 October 1997 (aged 21)	-	200	-	89	267

== Group 4 ==
=== Macau ===
9 players are scheduled to represent Macau in the 2019 Sudirman Cup.

Name	DoB/Age	MS Rank	WS Rank	MD Rank	WD Rank	XD Rank
Ao I Kuan	9 October 1999 (aged 19)	-	754	-	341	-
Gong Xue Xin	12 October 1999 (aged 19)	-	503	-	115	279
Kuan Chi Leng	19 September 1998 (aged 20)	-	-	-	-	341
Lam Chi Man		-	-	-	-	-
Leong Kin Fai		-	-	-	-	-
Ng Chi Chong	10 April 1994 (aged 25)	-	-	-	-	-
Ng Weng Chi	31 March 1998 (aged 21)	-	290	-	115	632
Pui Chi Wa	1 February 2005 (aged 14)	-	-	-	-	-
Pui Pang Fong	13 March 2000 (aged 19)	339	-	375	-	-

=== Kazakhstan ===
11 players are scheduled to represent Kazakhstan in the 2019 Sudirman Cup.

Name	DoB/Age	MS Rank	WS Rank	MD Rank	WD Rank	XD Rank
Aisha Zhumabek	7 June 2000 (aged 18)	-	556	-	463	611
Arina Sazonova	23 December 1988 (aged 30)	-	754	-	656	782
Arman Murzabekov	19 February 1995 (aged 24)	606	-	1241	-	-
Artur Niyazov	30 August 1993 (aged 25)	294	-	147	-	487
Dmitriy Panarin	8 January 2000 (aged 19)	236	-	147	-	289
Kamila Smagulova	14 June 1997 (aged 21)	-	754	-	656	1089
Khaitmurat Kulmatov	19 February 1996 (aged 23)	341	-	409	-	611
Nikita Bragin	1 April 1988 (aged 31)	641	-	1050	-	782
Oxsana Shtelle	30 April 1998 (aged 21)	-	-	-	-	-
Veronika Sorokina		754	-	463	-	487
Yevgeniy Yevseyev	21 August 1997 (aged 21)	532	-	627	-	1089

=== Greenland ===
6 players are scheduled to represent Greenland in the 2019 Sudirman Cup.

Name	DoB/Age	MS Rank	WS Rank	MD Rank	WD Rank	XD Rank
Frederik Elsner	24 July 1986 (aged 32)	821	-	1241	-	-
Jens-Frederik Nielsen	22 June 1991 (aged 27)	821	-	1241	-	-
Milka Brønlund	24 April 1998 (aged 21)	-	-	-	-	-
Nina Høegh	20 April 1993 (aged 26)	-	-	-	-	-
Sara Lindskov Jacobsen	15 July 1994 (aged 24)	-	910	-	800	-
Toke Ketwa-Driefer	7 October 1998 (aged 20)	1120	-	-	-	1029
