= Badminton at the 2015 Summer Universiade – Mixed team =

Mixed team at the 2015 Summer Universiade
- Venue: Hwasun Hanium Culture Sports Center
- Location: Hwasun, South Korea
- Dates: 6–8 July 2015
- Nations: 25

Medalists
gold medal	South Korea (KOR)
silver medal	China (CHN)
bronze medal	Malaysia (MAS)
bronze medal	Thailand (THA)

The mixed team badminton event at the 2015 Summer Universiade was held from 6 to 8 July at the Hwasun Hanium Culture Sports Center in Hwasun, South Korea.

South Korea defended their title after defeating China in the final.

== Group composition ==
Group A	Group B	Group C	Group D
China; Poland; United States	France; Japan; Philippines	Australia; Chinese Taipei; Sri Lanka	India; Switzerland; Thailand
Group E	Group F	Group G	Group H
Estonia; Hong Kong; Indonesia; Russia	Brazil; Finland; Malaysia	Botswana; Canada; Germany	Great Britain; South Korea; Uganda

== Group stage ==
=== Group A ===
Pos	Team	Pld	W	L	MF	MA	MD	GF	GA	GD	PF	PA	PD	Pts	Qualification	People's Republic of China	Poland	United States
1	China	2	2	0	10	0	+10	20	0	+20	420	182	+238	2	Quarter-finals	—	5–0	5–0
2	Poland	2	1	1	5	5	0	10	10	0	325	347	−22	1	9th–16th place		—	5–0
3	United States	2	0	2	0	10	−10	0	20	−20	204	420	−216	0	17th–24th place			—

Source: gwangju2015.com

==== China vs United States ====
China
5
Hwasun Hanium Culture Sports Center,
Court 1
6 July 2015, 09:00 UTC+9

United States
0

			1	2	3
1	(China) (United States)	Wang Yilyu / Yu Xiaohan; Erika Sporkert / Timothy Hsu	21; 4	21; 9
2	(China) (United States)	Qiao Bin; Chetan Potu	21; 6	21; 8
3	(China) (United States)	Xu Zuopeng / Zhang Zhijun; Derrick Long / Ashwin Narkar	21; 5	21; 11
4	(China) (United States)	Fan Mengyan; Angela Zhang	21; 3	21; 3
5	(China) (United States)	Ou Dongni / Yu Xiaohan; Stephanie Lam / Adrienne Lin	21; 11	21; 7

==== Poland vs United States ====
Poland
5
Hwasun Hanium Culture Sports Center,
Court 7
6 July 2015, 15:00 UTC+9

United States
0

			1	2	3
1	(Poland) (United States)	Paweł Pietryja / Aneta Wojtkowska; Derrick Long / Adrienne Lin	21; 12	21; 8
2	(Poland) (United States)	Mateusz Dubowski; Chetan Potu	21; 19	21; 17
3	(Poland) (United States)	Weronika Grudzina; Angela Zhang	21; 12	21; 17
4	(Poland) (United States)	Paweł Pietryja / Mateusz Świerczyński; Ashwin Narkar / Chetan Potu	21; 14	21; 12
5	(Poland) (United States)	Karolina Gajos / Aneta Wojtkowska; Stephanie Lam / Adrienne Lin	21; 8	21; 18

==== China vs Poland ====
China
5
Hwasun Hanium Culture Sports Center,
Court 8
7 July 2015, 09:00 UTC+9

Poland
0

			1	2	3
1	(China) (Poland)	Wang Yilyu / Yu Xiaohan; Paweł Pietryja / Aneta Wojtkowska	21; 16	21; 12
2	(China) (Poland)	Gao Huan; Mateusz Świerczyński	21; 17	21; 15
3	(China) (Poland)	Wang Yilyu / Zhang Wen; Mateusz Dubowski / Paweł Pietryja	21; 17	21; 9
4	(China) (Poland)	Hui Xirui; Weronika Grudzina	21; 5	21; 9
5	(China) (Poland)	Ou Dongni / Yu Xiaohan; Karolina Gajos / Aneta Wojtkowska	21; 6	21; 9

=== Group B ===
Pos	Team	Pld	W	L	MF	MA	MD	GF	GA	GD	PF	PA	PD	Pts	Qualification	Japan	France	Philippines
1	Japan	2	2	0	9	1	+8	18	3	+15	436	268	+168	2	Quarter-finals	—	4–1	5–0
2	France	2	1	1	6	4	+2	13	10	+3	424	368	+56	1	9th–16th place		—	5–0
3	Philippines	2	0	2	0	10	−10	2	20	−18	231	455	−224	0	17th–24th place			—

Source: gwangju2015.com

==== Japan vs Philippines ====
Japan
5
Hwasun Hanium Culture Sports Center,
Court 2
6 July 2015, 09:00 UTC+9

Philippines
0

			1	2	3
1	(Japan) (Philippines)	Akira Koga / Shiho Tanaka; Petronilo Jr. Nim / Gielyn Erika Ochoa	21; 8	21; 7
2	(Japan) (Philippines)	Kenta Nishimoto; J. C. Clarito	21; 7	21; 11
3	(Japan) (Philippines)	Natsumi Shimoda; Gilly Chavez	21; 10	21; 3
4	(Japan) (Philippines)	Kohtaro Miyajima / Masato Takano; J. C. Clarito / Petronilo Jr. Nim	21; 18	21; 10
5	(Japan) (Philippines)	Mirai Shinoda / Natsumi Uratani; Gielyn Erika Ochoa / Jean Marie Lucas	21; 6	21; 9

==== France vs Philippines ====
France
5
Hwasun Hanium Culture Sports Center,
Court 8
6 July 2015, 15:00 UTC+9

Philippines
0

			1	2	3
1	(France) (Philippines)	Bastian Kersaudy / Lea Palermo; Petronilo Jr. Nim / Gielyn Erika Ochoa	21; 9	21; 12
2	(France) (Philippines)	Yoann Turlan; J. C. Clarito	21; 15	19; 21	21; 12
3	(France) (Philippines)	Anne Tran; Gilly Chavez	21; 7	21; 10
4	(France) (Philippines)	Laurent Constantin / Bastian Kersaudy; J. C. Clarito / Petronilo Jr. Nim	16; 21	21; 8	21; 8
5	(France) (Philippines)	Marie Batomene / Lorraine Baumann; Gielyn Erika Ochoa / Jean Marie Lucas	21; 10	21; 9

==== Japan vs France ====
Japan
4
Hwasun Hanium Culture Sports Center,
Court 5
7 July 2015, 09:00 UTC+9

France
1

			1	2	3
1	(Japan) (France)	Ryo Kanda / Tomoki Arai; Bastian Kersaudy / Laurent Constantin	21; 13	21; 18
2	(Japan) (France)	Kenta Nishimoto; Lucas Claerbout	15; 21	21; 13	21; 11
3	(Japan) (France)	Natsumi Shimoda; Tran Anne	21; 17	21; 11
4	(Japan) (France)	Miki Kashihara / Miyuki Kato; Lorraine Baumann / Marie Batomene	21; 12	21; 16
5	(Japan) (France)	Akira Koga / Shiho Tanaka; Bastian Kersaudy / Lea Palermo	19; 21	24; 26

=== Group C ===
Pos	Team	Pld	W	L	MF	MA	MD	GF	GA	GD	PF	PA	PD	Pts	Qualification	Chinese Taipei for Universiade	Sri Lanka	Australia
1	Chinese Taipei	2	2	0	10	0	+10	20	0	+20	420	204	+216	2	Quarter-finals	—	5–0	5–0
2	Sri Lanka	2	1	1	3	7	−4	6	15	−9	292	394	−102	1	9th–16th place		—	3–2
3	Australia	2	0	2	2	8	−6	5	16	−11	284	398	−114	0	17th–24th place			—

Source: gwangju2015.com

==== Chinese Taipei vs Sri Lanka ====
Chinese Taipei
5
Hwasun Hanium Culture Sports Center,
Court 3
6 July 2015, 09:00 UTC+9

Sri Lanka
0

			1	2	3
1	(Chinese Taipei) (Sri Lanka)	Liao Min-chun / Tseng Min-hao; Chinthaka Manimel Wadu / P. R. Weerasuriya	21; 7	21; 8
2	(Chinese Taipei) (Sri Lanka)	Tai Tzu-ying; Achini Ratnasiri	21; 11	21; 17
3	(Chinese Taipei) (Sri Lanka)	Chou Tien-chen; Pamuditha Lahiru Ambegoda	21; 12	21; 12
4	(Chinese Taipei) (Sri Lanka)	Hsieh Pei-chen / Wu Ti-jung; Achini Narmada Herath / S. N. Weerasinghe	21; 9	21; 6
5	(Chinese Taipei) (Sri Lanka)	Lu Ching-yao / Chiang Kai-hsin; Pamuditha Lahiru Ambegoda / Achini Ratnasiri	21; 12	21; 10

==== Australia vs Sri Lanka ====
Australia
2
Hwasun Hanium Culture Sports Center,
Court 9
6 July 2015, 15:00 UTC+9

Sri Lanka
3

			1	2	3
1	(Australia) (Sri Lanka)	Eric Vuong; Pamuditha Lahiru Ambegoda	14; 21	21; 19	15; 21
2	(Australia) (Sri Lanka)	Melinda Sun; Achini Ratnasiri	11; 21	11; 21
3	(Australia) (Sri Lanka)	Luke Chong / Elliott Clutterbuck; Chinthaka Manimel Wadu / P. R. Weerasuriya	21; 11	21; 15
4	(Australia) (Sri Lanka)	Ann-Louise Slee / Jennifer Tam; Achini Narmada Herath / S. N. Weerasinghe	21; 8	21; 9
5	(Australia) (Sri Lanka)	Luke Chong / Ann-Louise Slee; Pamuditha Lahiru Ambegoda / Achini Ratnasiri	15; 21	13; 21

==== Chinese Taipei vs Australia ====
Chinese Taipei
5
Hwasun Hanium Culture Sports Center,
Court 3
7 July 2015, 09:00 UTC+9

Australia
0

			1	2	3
1	(Chinese Taipei) (Australia)	Hsu Jen-hao; Luke Chong	21; 11	21; 11
2	(Chinese Taipei) (Australia)	Pai Yu-po; Melinda Sun	21; 3	21; 11
3	(Chinese Taipei) (Australia)	Hsu Jen-hao / Lu Ching-yao; Luke Chong / Eric Vuong	21; 14	21; 13
4	(Chinese Taipei) (Australia)	Hsu Ya-ching / Pai Yu-po; Ann-Louise Slee / Jennifer Tam	21; 5	21; 11
5	(Chinese Taipei) (Australia)	Wang Chi-lin / Wu Ti-jung; Elliott Clutterbuck / Melinda Sun	21; 12	21; 9

=== Group D ===
Pos	Team	Pld	W	L	MF	MA	MD	GF	GA	GD	PF	PA	PD	Pts	Qualification	Thailand	India	Switzerland
1	Thailand	2	2	0	10	0	+10	20	1	+19	438	267	+171	2	Quarter-finals	—	5–0	5–0
2	India	2	1	1	4	6	−2	10	13	−3	388	424	−36	1	9th–16th place		—	4–1
3	Switzerland	2	0	2	1	9	−8	3	19	−16	324	459	−135	0	17th–24th place			—

Source: gwangju2015.com

==== Thailand vs India ====
Thailand
5
Hwasun Hanium Culture Sports Center,
Court 4
6 July 2015, 09:00 UTC+9

India
0

			1	2	3
1	(Thailand) (India)	Nipitphon Phuangphuapet / Phataimas Muenwong; Hema Nagendra Babu Thandarang / K. Maneesha	21; 9	21; 18
2	(Thailand) (India)	Tanongsak Saensomboonsuk; Shreyansh Jaiswal	21; 18	21; 17
3	(Thailand) (India)	Bodin Isara / Nipitphon Phuangphuapet; Arjun Malgari / Santosh Ravuri	21; 7	21; 15
4	(Thailand) (India)	Busanan Ongbamrungphan; Vaishnavi Bhale	21; 6	21; 11
5	(Thailand) (India)	Jongkolphan Kititharakul / Rawinda Prajongjai; K. Maneesha / Meghana Jakkampudi	21; 11	21; 9

==== Switzerland vs India ====
Switzerland
1
Hwasun Hanium Culture Sports Center,
Court 1
6 July 2015, 15:00 UTC+9

India
4

			1	2	3
1	(Switzerland) (India)	Thomas Heiniger / Sanya Herzig; Hema Nagendra Babu Thandarang / Meghana Jakkampudi	12; 21	21; 19	21; 18
2	(Switzerland) (India)	Christian Kirchmayr; Shreyansh Jaiswal	18; 21	9; 21
3	(Switzerland) (India)	Christoph Heiniger / Thomas Heiniger; Arjun Malgari / Hema Nagendra Babu Thandarang	25; 23	16; 21	12; 21
4	(Switzerland) (India)	Ayla Huser; Vaishnavi Bhale	14; 21	14; 21
5	(Switzerland) (India)	Cendrine Hantz / Sanya Herzig; K. Maneesha / Meghana Jakkampudi	17; 21	17; 21

==== Thailand vs Switzerland ====
Thailand
5
Hwasun Hanium Culture Sports Center,
Court 4
7 July 2015, 09:00 UTC+9

Switzerland
0

			1	2	3
1	(Thailand) (Switzerland)	Jakkit Tuntirasin / Chayanit Chaladchalam; Thomas Heiniger / Sanya Herzig	21; 9	21; 18
2	(Thailand) (Switzerland)	Suppanyu Avihingsanon; Christian Kirchmayr	21; 15	21; 14
3	(Thailand) (Switzerland)	Bodin Isara / Nipitphon Phuangphuapet; Christoph Heiniger / Thomas Heiniger	21; 12	21; 10
4	(Thailand) (Switzerland)	Porntip Buranaprasertsuk; Cendrine Hantz	21; 14	21; 13
5	(Thailand) (Switzerland)	Jongkolphan Kititharakul / Rawinda Prajongjai; Sanya Herzig / Ayla Huser	21; 10	21; 13

=== Group E ===
Pos	Team	Pld	W	L	MF	MA	MD	GF	GA	GD	PF	PA	PD	Pts	Qualification	Indonesia	Russia	Hong Kong	Estonia
1	Indonesia	3	3	0	13	2	+11	27	7	+20	665	484	+181	3	Quarter-finals	—	3–2	5–0	5–0
2	Russia	3	2	1	11	4	+7	24	9	+15	659	449	+210	2	9th–16th place		—	5–0	4–1
3	Hong Kong	3	1	2	4	11	−7	10	22	−12	518	555	−37	1	17th–24th place			—	4–1
4	Estonia	3	0	3	2	13	−11	4	27	−23	294	648	−354	0	25th place				—

Source: gwangju2015.com

==== Russia vs Estonia ====
Russia
4
Hwasun Hanium Culture Sports Center,
Court 5
6 July 2015, 09:00 UTC+9

Estonia
1

			1	2	3
1	(Russia) (Estonia)	Denis Grachev / Irina Khlebko; Kert Räis / Melissa Mazurtšak				w/o
2	(Russia) (Estonia)	Anton Ivanov; Kaspar Kapp	21; 16	21; 15
3	(Russia) (Estonia)	Elena Komendrovskaja; Karoliine Hõim	19; 21	21; 11	24; 26
4	(Russia) (Estonia)	Nikita Khakimov / Vasily Kuznetsov; Kaspar Kapp / Kert Räis				w/o
5	(Russia) (Estonia)	Anastasia Chervyakova / Olga Morozova; Karoliine Hõim / Melissa Mazurtšak	21; 11	21; 8

==== Indonesia vs Hong Kong ====
Indonesia
5
Hwasun Hanium Culture Sports Center,
Court 9
6 July 2015, 09:00 UTC+9

Hong Kong
0

			1	2	3
1	(Indonesia) (Hong Kong)	Arya Maulana Aldiartama / Febby Angguni; Ng Ka Wai / Yeung Hiu Tung	17; 21	21; 13	21; 13
2	(Indonesia) (Hong Kong)	Siswanto; Tang Ho Kan	21; 19	21; 19
3	(Indonesia) (Hong Kong)	Aprilia Yuswandari; Yeung Lee Ling	21; 8	21; 13
4	(Indonesia) (Hong Kong)	Setiawan Hidayat / Agripina Prima Rahmanto Putra; Ng Ka Wai / Tang Ho Kan	21; 19	17; 21	21; 12
5	(Indonesia) (Hong Kong)	Keshya Nurvita Hanadia / Devi Tika Permatasari; Yeung Hiu Tung / Yeung Lee Ling	21; 11	21; 13

==== Indonesia vs Estonia ====
Indonesia
5
Hwasun Hanium Culture Sports Center,
Court 6
6 July 2015, 15:00 UTC+9

Estonia
0

			1	2	3
1	(Indonesia) (Estonia)	Agripina Prima Rahmanto Putra / Keshya Nurvita Hanadia; Kert Räis / Melissa Mazurtšak				w/o
2	(Indonesia) (Estonia)	Siswanto; Kaspar Kapp	21; 16	21; 10
3	(Indonesia) (Estonia)	Febby Angguni; Karoliine Hõim	22; 20	21; 19
4	(Indonesia) (Estonia)	Arya Maulana Aldiartama / Setiawan Hidayat; Kaspar Kapp / Kert Räis				w/o
5	(Indonesia) (Estonia)	Devi Tika Permatasari / Aprilia Yuswandari; Karoliine Hõim / Melissa Mazurtšak	21; 11	21; 9

==== Hong Kong vs Estonia ====
Hong Kong
4
Hwasun Hanium Culture Sports Center,
Court 9
7 July 2015, 09:00 UTC+9

Estonia
1

			1	2	3
1	(Hong Kong) (Estonia)	Tang Ho Kan / Yeung Hiu Tung; Kert Räis / Melissa Mazurtšak				w/o
2	(Hong Kong) (Estonia)	Ng Ka Wai; Kaspar Kapp	21; 17	21; 17
3	(Hong Kong) (Estonia)	Yeung Lee Ling; Karoliine Hõim	17; 21	20; 22
4	(Hong Kong) (Estonia)	Tang Ho Kan / Yuen Pak Ho; Kaspar Kapp / Kert Räis				w/o
5	(Hong Kong) (Estonia)	Yeung Hiu Tung / Yeung Lee Ling; Karoliine Hõim / Melissa Mazurtšak	21; 12	21; 12

==== Indonesia vs Russia ====
Indonesia
3
Hwasun Hanium Culture Sports Center,
Court 2
7 July 2015, 09:00 UTC+9

Russia
2

			1	2	3
1	(Indonesia) (Russia)	Agripina Prima Rahmanto Putra / Devi Tika Permatasari; Andrey Parakhodin / Anastasia Chervyakova	21; 18	21; 10
2	(Indonesia) (Russia)	Siswanto; Sergey Sirant	10; 21	6; 21
3	(Indonesia) (Russia)	Arya Maulana Aldiartama / Setiawan Hidayat; Nikita Khakimov / Vasily Kuznetsov	21; 18	14; 21	16; 21
4	(Indonesia) (Russia)	Aprilia Yuswandari; Elena Komendrovskaja	21; 14	21; 14
5	(Indonesia) (Russia)	Devi Tika Permatasari / Keshya Nurvita Hanadia; Anastasia Chervyakova / Olga Morozova	21; 18	16; 21	22; 20

==== Russia vs Hong Kong ====
Russia
5
Hwasun Hanium Culture Sports Center,
Court 2
7 July 2015, 15:00 UTC+9

Hong Kong
0

			1	2	3
1	(Russia) (Hong Kong)	Andrey Parakhodin / Anastasia Chervyakova; Ng Ka Wai / Yeung Hiu Tung	21; 5	21; 17
2	(Russia) (Hong Kong)	Sergey Sirant; Tang Ho Kan	21; 11	21; 15
3	(Russia) (Hong Kong)	Elena Komendrovskaja; Yeung Lee Ling	21; 14	21; 18
4	(Russia) (Hong Kong)	Nikita Khakimov / Vasily Kuznetsov; Ng Ka Wai / Tang Ho Kan	21; 10	21; 16
5	(Russia) (Hong Kong)	Anastasia Chervyakova / Olga Morozova; Yeung Hiu Tung / Yeung Lee Ling	21; 15	21; 10

=== Group F ===
Pos	Team	Pld	W	L	MF	MA	MD	GF	GA	GD	PF	PA	PD	Pts	Qualification	Malaysia	Finland	Brazil
1	Malaysia	2	2	0	10	0	+10	20	1	+19	440	254	+186	2	Quarter-finals	—	5–0	5–0
2	Finland	2	1	1	5	5	0	11	11	0	392	370	+22	1	9th–16th place		—	5–0
3	Brazil	2	0	2	0	10	−10	1	20	−19	232	440	−208	0	17th–24th place			—

Source: gwangju2015.com

==== Malaysia vs Finland ====
Malaysia
5
Hwasun Hanium Culture Sports Center,
Court 6
6 July 2015, 09:00 UTC+9

Finland
0

			1	2	3
1	(Malaysia) (Finland)	Muhammad Syawal Mohd Ismail / Sannatasah Saniru; Petri Hautala / Sanni Rautala	19; 21	21; 10	22; 20
2	(Malaysia) (Finland)	Zulfadli Zulkiffli; Anton Kaisti	21; 18	21; 15
3	(Malaysia) (Finland)	Lyddia Cheah; Sonja Pekkola	21; 10	21; 5
4	(Malaysia) (Finland)	Vountus Indra Mawan / Jagdish Singh; Petri Hautala / Anton Kaisti	21; 16	21; 17
5	(Malaysia) (Finland)	Erica Khoo / Ti Wei Chyi; Sonja Pekkola / Sanni Rautala	21; 15	21; 15

==== Finland vs Brazil ====
Finland
5
Hwasun Hanium Culture Sports Center,
Court 3
6 July 2015, 15:00 UTC+9

Brazil
0

			1	2	3
1	(Finland) (Brazil)	Anton Kaisti / Sanni Rautala; Leonardo Alkimim / Ana Paula Campos	21; 8	21; 14
2	(Finland) (Brazil)	Petri Hautala; Luíz dos Santos	21; 12	21; 14
3	(Finland) (Brazil)	Sonja Pekkola; Gabriela Santos	21; 8	21; 14
4	(Finland) (Brazil)	Petri Hautala / Anton Kaisti; Leonardo Alkimim / Luíz dos Santos	20; 22	21; 19	21; 17
5	(Finland) (Brazil)	Sonja Pekkola / Sanni Rautala; Ana Paula Campos / Gabriela Santos	21; 8	21; 4

==== Malaysia vs Brazil ====
Malaysia
5
Hwasun Hanium Culture Sports Center,
Court 6
7 July 2015, 09:00 UTC+9

Brazil
0

			1	2	3
1	(Malaysia) (Brazil)	Vountus Indra Mawan / Sannatasah Saniru; Leonardo Alkimim / Ana Paula Campos	21; 13	21; 5
2	(Malaysia) (Brazil)	Zulfadli Zulkiffli; Luíz dos Santos	21; 16	21; 14
3	(Malaysia) (Brazil)	Sylvia Kavita Kumares; Gabriela Santos	21; 8	21; 4
4	(Malaysia) (Brazil)	Low Juan Shen / Jagdish Singh; Leonardo Alkimim / Luíz dos Santos	21; 8	21; 8
5	(Malaysia) (Brazil)	Erica Khoo / Daphne Ng; Ana Paula Campos / Gabriela Santos	21; 6	21; 10

=== Group G ===
Pos	Team	Pld	W	L	MF	MA	MD	GF	GA	GD	PF	PA	PD	Pts	Qualification	Germany	Canada	Botswana
1	Germany	2	2	0	9	1	+8	18	3	+15	415	205	+210	2	Quarter-finals	—	4–1	5–0
2	Canada	2	1	1	6	4	+2	13	8	+5	358	293	+65	1	9th–16th place		—	5–0
3	Botswana	2	0	2	0	10	−10	0	20	−20	145	420	−275	0	17th–24th place			—

Source: gwangju2015.com

==== Germany vs Botswana ====
Germany
5
Hwasun Hanium Culture Sports Center,
Court 7
6 July 2015, 09:00 UTC+9

Botswana
0

			1	2	3
1	(Germany) (Botswana)	Fabian Holzer / Linda Efler; Tumisang Olekantse / Dintle Malepa	21; 2	21; 5
2	(Germany) (Botswana)	Fabian Roth; Gaone Tawana	21; 5	21; 10
3	(Germany) (Botswana)	Franziska Volkmann; Botho Makubate	21; 7	21; 12
4	(Germany) (Botswana)	Peter Käsbauer / Mark Lamsfuß; Tumisang Olekantse / Gaone Tawana	21; 2	21; 3
5	(Germany) (Botswana)	Isabel Herttrich / Franziska Volkmann; Botho Makubate / Dintle Malepa	21; 6	21; 5

==== Canada vs Botswana ====
Canada
5
Hwasun Hanium Culture Sports Center,
Court 4
6 July 2015, 15:00 UTC+9

Botswana
0

			1	2	3
1	(Canada) (Botswana)	Phillipe Charron / Caroline Beauregard; Gaone Tawana / Dintle Malepa	21; 8	21; 8
2	(Canada) (Botswana)	Alexis Gohier-Drolet; Tumisang Olekantse	21; 11	21; 9
3	(Canada) (Botswana)	Stéphanie Pakenham; Botho Makubate	21; 7	21; 4
4	(Canada) (Botswana)	Phillipe Gaumond / Maxime Marin; Tumisang Olekantse / Gaone Tawana	21; 11	21; 14
5	(Canada) (Botswana)	Vicky Girard-Simmons / Tracy Wong; Dintle Malepa / Botho Makubate	21; 9	21; 7

==== Germany vs Canada ====
Germany
4
Hwasun Hanium Culture Sports Center,
Court 7
7 July 2015, 09:00 UTC+9

Canada
1

			1	2	3
1	(Germany) (Canada)	Mark Lamsfuß / Isabel Herttrich; Phillipe Gaumond / Tracy Wong	21; 13	21; 10
2	(Germany) (Canada)	Fabian Roth; Alexis Gohier-Drolet	21; 9	21; 10
3	(Germany) (Canada)	Fabian Holzer / Peter Käsbauer; Phillipe Charron / Maxime Tétreault	21; 16	21; 14
4	(Germany) (Canada)	Franziska Volkmann; Stéphanie Pakenham	9; 21	10; 21
5	(Germany) (Canada)	Linda Efler / Isabel Herttrich; Caroline Beauregard / Vicky Girard-Simmons	18; 21	21; 3	21; 10

=== Group H ===
Pos	Team	Pld	W	L	MF	MA	MD	GF	GA	GD	PF	PA	PD	Pts	Qualification	South Korea	United Kingdom	Uganda
1	South Korea	2	2	0	10	0	+10	20	1	+19	437	212	+225	2	Quarter-finals	—	5–0	5–0
2	Great Britain	2	1	1	5	5	0	11	10	+1	356	322	+34	1	9th–16th place		—	5–0
3	Uganda	2	0	2	0	10	−10	0	20	−20	161	420	−259	0	17th–24th place			—

Source: gwangju2015.com

==== South Korea vs Uganda ====
South Korea
5
Hwasun Hanium Culture Sports Center,
Court 8
6 July 2015, 09:00 UTC+9

Uganda
0

			1	2	3
1	(South Korea) (Uganda)	Ko Sung-hyun / Lee So-hee; Herbert Ebayo / Daisy Nakalyango	21; 8	21; 4
2	(South Korea) (Uganda)	Jeon Hyeok-jin; Jacob Musisi	21; 4	21; 14
3	(South Korea) (Uganda)	Kim Hyo-min; Bridget Shamim Bangi	21; 4	21; 12
4	(South Korea) (Uganda)	Kim Gi-jung / Kim Sa-rang; Herbert Ebayo / Jacob Musisi	21; 4	21; 8
5	(South Korea) (Uganda)	Go Ah-ra / Yoo Hae-won; Bridget Shamim Bangi / Daisy Nakalyango	21; 4	21; 4

==== Great Britain vs Uganda ====
Great Britain
5
Hwasun Hanium Culture Sports Center,
Court 5
6 July 2015, 15:00 UTC+9

Uganda
0

			1	2	3
1	(United Kingdom) (Uganda)	Martin Campbell / Victoria Williams; Herbert Ebayo / Daisy Nakalyango	21; 3	21; 12
2	(United Kingdom) (Uganda)	Angus Nils Pedersen; Daniel Mihigo	21; 5	21; 16
3	(United Kingdom) (Uganda)	Kerri Scott; Bridget Shamim Bangi	21; 12	21; 18
4	(United Kingdom) (Uganda)	Martin Campbell / Patrick MacHugh; Herbert Ebayo / Jacob Musisi	21; 7	21; 5
5	(United Kingdom) (Uganda)	Caitlin Pringle / Rebekka Findlay; Bridget Shamin Bangi / Daisy Nakalyango	21; 8	21; 9

==== South Korea vs Great Britain ====
South Korea
5
Hwasun Hanium Culture Sports Center,
Court 1
7 July 2015, 09:00 UTC+9

Great Britain
0

			1	2	3
1	(South Korea) (United Kingdom)	Kim Gi-jung / Shin Seung-chan; Martin Campbell / Victoria Williams	21; 8	21; 16
2	(South Korea) (United Kingdom)	Son Wan-ho; Matthew Carder	21; 14	21; 7
3	(South Korea) (United Kingdom)	Sung Ji-hyun; Chloe Birch	21; 17	17; 21	21; 17
4	(South Korea) (United Kingdom)	Ko Sung-hyun / Lee Yong-dae; Martin Campbell / Patrick MacHugh	21; 9	21; 15
5	(South Korea) (United Kingdom)	Go Ah-ra / Yoo Hae-won; Chloe Birch / Victoria Williams	21; 12	21; 10

== Ranking stage ==
=== Main draw ===
Quarter-finals
China	3
Japan	0
Chinese Taipei	2
Thailand	3
Indonesia	2
Malaysia	3
Germany	0
South Korea	3

Semi-finals
China	3
Thailand	1
Malaysia	0
South Korea	3

Gold medal match
China	0
South Korea	3

==== Quarter-finals ====
China
3
Hwasun Hanium Culture Sports Center,
Court 3
7 July 2015, 15:00 UTC+9

Japan
0

			1	2	3
1	(China) (Japan)	Wang Yilyu / Yu Xiaohan; Akira Koga / Shiho Tanaka	21; 11	20; 22	22; 20
2	(China) (Japan)	Qiao Bin; Kenta Nishimoto	21; 15	21; 14
3	(China) (Japan)	Wang Yilyu / Zhang Wen; Akira Koga / Masato Takano	21; 16	21; 9
4	(China) (Japan)	Hui Xirui; Natsumi Shimoda				not played
5	(China) (Japan)	Ou Dongni / Yu Xiaohan; Shiho Tanaka / Natsumi Uratani				not played

Chinese Taipei
2
Hwasun Hanium Culture Sports Center,
Court 1
7 July 2015, 15:00 UTC+9

Thailand
3

			1	2	3
1	(Chinese Taipei) (Thailand)	Liao Min-chun / Tseng Min-hao; Bodin Isara / Nipitphon Phuangphuapet	21; 19	17; 21	18; 21
2	(Chinese Taipei) (Thailand)	Tai Tzu-ying; Busanan Ongbamrungphan	21; 7	21; 15
3	(Chinese Taipei) (Thailand)	Chou Tien-chen; Tanongsak Saensomboonsuk	21; 19	21; 16
4	(Chinese Taipei) (Thailand)	Hsieh Pei-chen / Wu Ti-jung; Porntip Buranaprasertsuk / Busanan Ongbamrungphan	24; 26	21; 15	12; 21
5	(Chinese Taipei) (Thailand)	Lu Ching-yao / Chiang Kai-hsin; Nipitphon Phuangphuapet / Chayanit Chaladchalam	13; 21	17; 21

Indonesia
2
Hwasun Hanium Culture Sports Center,
Court 4
7 July 2015, 15:00 UTC+9

Malaysia
3

			1	2	3
1	(Indonesia) (Malaysia)	Agripina Prima Rahmanto Putra / Keshya Nurvita Hanadia; Mohamad Arif Abdul Latif / Sannatasah Saniru	21; 15	21; 13
2	(Indonesia) (Malaysia)	Siswanto; Zulfadli Zulkiffli	9; 21	11; 21
3	(Indonesia) (Malaysia)	Arya Maulana Aldiartama / Agripina Prima Rahmanto Putra; Mohamad Arif Abdul Latif / Vountus Indra Mawan	21; 19	15; 21	17; 21
4	(Indonesia) (Malaysia)	Aprilia Yuswandari; Lyddia Cheah	21; 17	14; 21	21; 15
5	(Indonesia) (Malaysia)	Keshya Nurvita Hanadia / Devi Tika Permatasari; Sannatasah Saniru / Ti Wei Chyi	20; 22	21; 13	16; 23

Germany
0
Hwasun Hanium Culture Sports Center,
Court 2
7 July 2015, 15:00 UTC+9

South Korea
3

			1	2	3
1	(Germany) (South Korea)	Mark Lamsfuß / Isabel Herttrich; Ko Sung-hyun / Lee So-hee	21; 11	17; 21	20; 22
2	(Germany) (South Korea)	Fabian Roth; Jeon Hyeok-jin	18; 21	19; 21
3	(Germany) (South Korea)	Fabian Holzer / Peter Käsbauer; Kim Gi-jung / Kim Sa-rang	15; 21	15; 21
4	(Germany) (South Korea)	Franziska Volkmann; Kim Hyo-min				not played
5	(Germany) (South Korea)	Linda Efler / Isabel Herttrich; Lee So-hee / Shin Seung-chan				not played

==== Semi-finals ====
China
3
Hwasun Hanium Culture Sports Center,
Court 2
8 July 2015, 09:00 UTC+9

Thailand
1

			1	2	3
1	(China) (Thailand)	Wang Yilyu / Yu Xiaohan; Nipitphon Phuangphuapet / Chayanit Chaladchalam	20; 22	21; 13	21; 12
2	(China) (Thailand)	Qiao Bin; Tanongsak Saensomboonsuk	16; 21	21; 16	17; 21
3	(China) (Thailand)	Wang Yilyu / Zhang Wen; Bodin Isara / Nipitphon Phuangphuapet	21; 19	21; 12
4	(China) (Thailand)	Hui Xirui; Busanan Ongbamrungphan	22; 20	22; 20
5	(China) (Thailand)	Ou Dongni / Yu Xiaohan; Jongkolphan Kititharakul / Rawinda Prajongjai				not played

Malaysia
0
Hwasun Hanium Culture Sports Center,
Court 1
8 July 2015, 09:00 UTC+9

South Korea
3

			1	2	3
1	(Malaysia) (South Korea)	Low Juan Shen / Jagdish Singh; Kim Gi-jung / Kim Sa-rang	20; 22	18; 21
2	(Malaysia) (South Korea)	Sylvia Kavita Kumares; Kim Hyo-min	4; 21	7; 21
3	(Malaysia) (South Korea)	Mohamad Arif Abdul Latif; Jeon Hyeok-jin	16; 21	18; 21
4	(Malaysia) (South Korea)	Daphne Ng / Ti Wei Chyi; Lee So-hee / Shin Seung-chan				not played
5	(Malaysia) (South Korea)	Muhammad Syawal Mohd Ismail / Lyddia Cheah; Ko Sung-hyun / Yoo Hae-won				not played

==== Final ====
China
0
Hwasun Hanium Culture Sports Center,
Court 1
8 July 2015, 18:00 UTC+9

South Korea
3

			1	2	3
1	(China) (South Korea)	Zhang Wen / Ou Dongni; Kim Gi-jung / Shin Seung-chan	21; 15	17; 21	7; 21
2	(China) (South Korea)	Gao Huan; Son Wan-ho	13; 21	8; 21
3	(China) (South Korea)	Wang Yilyu / Zhang Wen; Lee Yong-dae / Ko Sung-hyun	19; 21	8; 21
4	(China) (South Korea)	Hui Xirui; Sung Ji-hyun				not played
5	(China) (South Korea)	Ou Dongni / Yu Xiaohan; Lee So-hee / Shin Seung-chan				not played

=== 9th–16th classification round ===
9th–16th
Poland	0
France	3
Sri Lanka	1
India	3
Russia	3
Finland	1
Canada	1
Great Britain	3

9th–12th
France	2
India	3
Russia	1
Great Britain	3

9th–10th
India	3
Great Britain	2

==== 9th–16th place ====
Poland
0
Hwasun Hanium Culture Sports Center,
Court 5
7 July 2015, 15:00 UTC+9

France
3

			1	2	3
1	(Poland) (France)	Paweł Pietryja / Aneta Wojtkowska; Bastian Kersaudy / Lea Palermo	21; 17	8; 21	12; 21
2	(Poland) (France)	Mateusz Świerczyński; Lucas Claerbout	14; 21	9; 21
3	(Poland) (France)	Weronika Grudzina; Anne Tran	24; 22	18; 21	20; 22
4	(Poland) (France)	Mateusz Dubowski / Paweł Pietryja; Laurent Constantin / Bastian Kersaudy				not played
5	(Poland) (France)	Karolina Gajos / Aneta Wojtkowska; Lea Palermo / Anne Tran				not played

Sri Lanka
1
Hwasun Hanium Culture Sports Center,
Court 6
7 July 2015, 15:00 UTC+9

India
3

			1	2	3
1	(Sri Lanka) (India)	Pamuditha Lahiru Ambegoda; Shreyansh Jaiswal	12; 21	11; 21
2	(Sri Lanka) (India)	Achini Ratnasiri; Vaishnavi Bhale	21; 13	15; 21	21; 8
3	(Sri Lanka) (India)	U. Y. S. Kariyawasam / P. R. Weerasuriya; Arjun Malgari / Hema Nagendra Babu Thandarang	7; 21	8; 21
4	(Sri Lanka) (India)	Achini Narmada Herath / S. N. Weerasinghe; K. Maneesha / Meghana Jakkampudi	4; 21	8; 21
5	(Sri Lanka) (India)	Pamuditha Lahiru Ambegoda / Achini Ratnasiri; Arjun Malgari / K. Maneesha				not played

Russia
3
Hwasun Hanium Culture Sports Center,
Court 7
7 July 2015, 15:00 UTC+9

Finland
1

			1	2	3
1	(Russia) (Finland)	Denis Grachev / Irina Khlebko; Petri Hautala / Sanni Rautala	21; 13	23; 21
2	(Russia) (Finland)	Anton Ivanov; Anton Kaisti	17; 21	20; 22
3	(Russia) (Finland)	Maria Shegurova; Sonja Pekkola	21; 18	21; 11
4	(Russia) (Finland)	Denis Grachev / Andrey Parakhodin; Petri Hautala / Anton Kaisti	21; 12	21; 10
5	(Russia) (Finland)	Irina Khlebko / Elena Komendrovskaja; Sonja Pekkola / Sanni Rautala				not played

Canada
1
Hwasun Hanium Culture Sports Center,
Court 8
7 July 2015, 15:00 UTC+9

Great Britain
3

			1	2	3
1	(Canada) (United Kingdom)	Phillipe Charron / Caroline Beauregard; Martin Campbell / Victoria Williams	13; 21	14; 21
2	(Canada) (United Kingdom)	Maxime Tétreault; Matthew Carder	13; 21	8; 21
3	(Canada) (United Kingdom)	Stéphanie Pakenham; Chloe Birch	21; 8	16; 21	21; 15
4	(Canada) (United Kingdom)	Phillipe Gaumond / Maxime Marin; Martin Campbell / Patrick MacHugh	14; 21	16; 21
5	(Canada) (United Kingdom)	Vicky Girard-Simmons / Tracy Wong; Chloe Birch / Victoria Williams				not played

==== 9th–12th place ====
France
2
Hwasun Hanium Culture Sports Center,
Court 3
8 July 2015, 09:00 UTC+9

India
3

			1	2	3
1	(France) (India)	Lucas Claerbout; Shreyansh Jaiswal	21; 16	18; 21	17; 21
2	(France) (India)	Anne Tran; Leela Lakshmi Rachapalli	21; 7	21; 18
3	(France) (India)	Laurent Constantin / Bastian Kersaudy; Arjun Malgari / Hema Nagendra Babu Thandarang	21; 13	19; 21	21; 9
4	(France) (India)	Marie Batomene / Lorraine Baumann; K. Maneesha / Meghana Jakkampudi	11; 21	21; 17	18; 21
5	(France) (India)	Bastian Kersaudy / Lea Palermo; Hema Nagendra Babu Thandarang / K. Maneesha	15; 21	21; 18	11; 21

Russia
1
Hwasun Hanium Culture Sports Center,
Court 4
8 July 2015, 09:00 UTC+9

Great Britain
3

			1	2	3
1	(Russia) (United Kingdom)	Vasily Kuznetsov / Olga Morozova; Martin Campbell / Victoria Williams	17; 21	21; 19	14; 21
2	(Russia) (United Kingdom)	Sergey Sirant; Matthew Carder	21; 14	21; 15
3	(Russia) (United Kingdom)	Nikita Khakimov / Vasily Kuznetsov; Martin Campbell / Patrick MacHugh	21; 16	14; 21	23; 25
4	(Russia) (United Kingdom)	Victoria Dergunova; Chloe Birch	13; 21	20; 22
5	(Russia) (United Kingdom)	Irina Khlebko / Elena Komendrovskaja; Caitlin Pringle / Victoria Williams				not played

==== 9th–10th place ====
India
3
Hwasun Hanium Culture Sports Center,
Court 3
8 July 2015, 14:00 UTC+9

Great Britain
2

			1	2	3
1	(India) (United Kingdom)	Hema Nagendra Babu Thandarang / K. Maneesha; Martin Campbell / Victoria Williams	21; 19	14; 21	16; 21
2	(India) (United Kingdom)	Rohit Yadav Chittaboina; Matthew Carder	21; 18	21; 15
3	(India) (United Kingdom)	Arjun Malgari / Santosh Ravuri; Martin Campbell / Patrick MacHugh	21; 16	21; 18
4	(India) (United Kingdom)	Leela Lakshmi Rachapalli; Chloe Birch	11; 21	8; 21
5	(India) (United Kingdom)	K. Maneesha / Meghana Jakkampudi; Caitlin Pringle / Victoria Williams	21; 9	13; 21	21; 19

=== 17th–24th classification round ===
17th–24th
United States	w/o
Philippines
Australia	2
Switzerland	3
Hong Kong	3
Brazil	1
Botswana	1
Uganda	3

17th–20th
United States	0
Switzerland	3
Hong Kong	3
Uganda	0

17th–18th
Switzerland	3
Hong Kong	0

==== 17th–24th place ====
Australia
2
Hwasun Hanium Culture Sports Center,
Court 3
7 July 2015, 17:00 UTC+9

Switzerland
3

			1	2	3
1	(Australia) (Switzerland)	Eric Vuong / Ann-Louise Slee; Thomas Heiniger / Sanya Herzig	17; 21	21; 18	13; 21
2	(Australia) (Switzerland)	Luke Chong; Christian Kirchmayr	14; 21	13; 21
3	(Australia) (Switzerland)	Jennifer Tam; Ayla Huser	14; 21	21; 12	21; 12
4	(Australia) (Switzerland)	Luke Chong / Elliott Clutterbuck; Christoph Heiniger / Thomas Heiniger	14; 21	21; 18	21; 19
5	(Australia) (Switzerland)	Ann-Louise Slee / Jennifer Tam; Cendrine Hantz / Sanya Herzig	14; 21	18; 21

Hong Kong
3
Hwasun Hanium Culture Sports Center,
Court 2
7 July 2015, 17:00 UTC+9

Brazil
1

			1	2	3
1	(Hong Kong) (Brazil)	Tang Ho Kan / Yeung Lee Ling; Leonardo Alkimim / Gabriela Santos	21; 15	21; 14
2	(Hong Kong) (Brazil)	Ng Ka Wai; Luíz dos Santos	14; 21	19; 21
3	(Hong Kong) (Brazil)	Yeung Hiu Tung; Ana Paula Campos	21; 12	21; 11
4	(Hong Kong) (Brazil)	Ng Ka Wai / Tang Ho Kan; Leonardo Alkimim / Luíz dos Santos	17; 21	21; 17	21; 6
5	(Hong Kong) (Brazil)	Yeung Hiu Tung / Yeung Lee Ling; Ana Paula Campos / Gabriela Santos				not played

Botswana
1
Hwasun Hanium Culture Sports Center,
Court 6
7 July 2015, 17:00 UTC+9

Uganda
3

			1	2	3
1	(Botswana) (Uganda)	Tumisang Olekantse / Dintle Malepa; Herbert Ebayo / Daisy Nakalyango	14; 21	14; 21
2	(Botswana) (Uganda)	Gaone Tawana; Daniel Mihigo	21; 9	21; 15
3	(Botswana) (Uganda)	Botho Makubate; Bridget Shamim Bangi	2; 21	9; 21
4	(Botswana) (Uganda)	Gaone Tawana / Tumisang Olekantse; Herbert Ebayo / Jacob Musisi	14; 21	21; 12	19; 21
5	(Botswana) (Uganda)	Botho Makubate / Dintle Malepa; Bridget Shamim Bangi / Daisy Nakalyango				not played

==== 17th–20th place ====
United States
0
Hwasun Hanium Culture Sports Center,
Court 7
8 July 2015, 09:00 UTC+9

Switzerland
3

			1	2	3
1	(United States) (Switzerland)	Derrick Long / Stephanie Lam; Thomas Heiniger / Sanya Herzig	10; 21	8; 21
2	(United States) (Switzerland)	Chetan Potu; Christian Kirchmayr	7; 21	8; 21
3	(United States) (Switzerland)	Angela Zhang; Cendrine Hantz	16; 21	14; 21
4	(United States) (Switzerland)	Ashwin Narkar / Chetan Potu; Christoph Heiniger / Thomas Heiniger				not played
5	(United States) (Switzerland)	Stephanie Lam / Adrienne Lin; Cendrine Hantz / Ayla Huser				not played

Hong Kong
3
Hwasun Hanium Culture Sports Center,
Court 8
8 July 2015, 09:00 UTC+9

Uganda
0

			1	2	3
1	(Hong Kong) (Uganda)	Ng Ka Wai / Yeung Lee Ling; Herbert Ebayo / Daisy Nakalyango	21; 13	21; 13
2	(Hong Kong) (Uganda)	Tang Ho Kan; Jacob Musisi	21; 14	21; 17
3	(Hong Kong) (Uganda)	Yeung Hiu Tung; Bridget Shamim Bangi	21; 14	21; 12
4	(Hong Kong) (Uganda)	Tang Ho Kan / Yuen Pak Ho; Herbert Ebayo / Jacob Musisi				not played
5	(Hong Kong) (Uganda)	Yeung Hiu Tung / Yeung Lee Ling; Bridget Shamim Bangi / Daisy Nakalyango				not played

==== 17th–18th place ====
Switzerland
3
Hwasun Hanium Culture Sports Center,
Court 4
8 July 2015, 13:00 UTC+9

Hong Kong
0

			1	2	3
1	(Switzerland) (Hong Kong)	Thomas Heiniger / Sanya Herzig; Ng Ka Wai / Yeung Hiu Tung	21; 19	19; 21	21; 18
2	(Switzerland) (Hong Kong)	Christian Kirchmayr; Tang Ho Kan	21; 17	17; 21	21; 13
3	(Switzerland) (Hong Kong)	Cendrine Hantz; Yeung Lee Ling	21; 10	17; 21	21; 18
4	(Switzerland) (Hong Kong)	Christoph Heiniger / Thomas Heiniger; Christoph Heiniger / Thomas Heiniger				not played
5	(Switzerland) (Hong Kong)	Cendrine Hantz / Ayla Huser; Yeung Hiu Tung / Yeung Lee Ling				not played

== Final ranking ==
Pos	Team
1st place, gold medalist(s)	South Korea
2nd place, silver medalist(s)	China
3rd place, bronze medalist(s)	Thailand
3rd place, bronze medalist(s)	Malaysia
5	Indonesia
5	Chinese Taipei
5	Germany
5	Japan
9	India
10	Great Britain
11	Russia
11	France
13	Canada
13	Finland
13	Poland
13	Sri Lanka
17	Switzerland
18	Hong Kong
19	Uganda
19	United States
20	Australia
20	Brazil
20	Philippines
20	Botswana
25	Estonia
