= 2017 Pan Am Badminton Championships =

Tournament details
- Dates: 16–19 February 2017 (Team event); 27-30 April 2017 (Individual event)
- Venue: Juan Pablo Duarte Olympic Center Volleyball Pavilion (Team event); Sports City Coliseum (Individual event)
- Location: Santo Domingo, Dominican Republic (Team event); Havana, Cuba (Individual event)

The XXI 2017 Pan American Badminton Championships consisted of two separate events held in different countries. From 16 to 19 February, the team event took place in Santo Domingo, Dominican Republic. From 27 to 30 April, the individual event occurred in Havana, Cuba.

== Venue ==
- The team event took place at the Juan Pablo Duarte Olympic Center Volleyball Pavilion in Santo Domingo, Dominican Republic.
- The individual event was held at the Sports City Coliseum, in Havana, Cuba.

== Medalists ==
In the team event, Canada secured the gold medal by defeating Brazil 3–0, winning the men's singles, women's singles and men's doubles matches.

Event	Gold	Silver	Bronze
Teams	Canada; Phillipe Gaumond, Jason Ho-Shue, Maxime Marin, Nyl Yakura, Anne-Julie Beaulieu, Josephine Wu, Stephanie Pakenham, Brittney Tam, Michelle Tong	Brazil; Artur Pomoceno, Hugo Arthuso, Francielton Farias, Fabricio Farias, Felipe Fonseca, Mateus Cutti, Vinicius Paula, Matheus Voigt, Ygor Oliveira, Luiz Santos, Ana Paula Campos, Mariana Freitas, Bianca Lima, Jaqueline Lima, Samia Lima, Amanda Santos, Fabiana Silva, Paloma Silva	United States; Vinson Chiu, Timothy Lam, Howard Shu, Nicholas Waller, Darren Yang, Nicole Frevold, Jennie Gai, Crystal Pan, Annie Xu, Kerry Xu
Men's singles	(Brazil) Ygor Coelho	(Cuba) Osleni Guerrero	(Cuba) Leodannis Martinez
Men's singles	(Brazil) Ygor Coelho	(Cuba) Osleni Guerrero	(United States) Bjorn Seguin
Women's singles	(Canada) Rachel Honderich	(Canada) Brittney Tam	(United States) Jamie Subandhi
Women's singles	(Canada) Rachel Honderich	(Canada) Brittney Tam	(Mexico) Mariana Ugalde
Men's doubles	(Canada) Jason Anthony Ho-Shue (Canada) Nyl Yakura	(Canada) Austin James Bauer (Canada) Ty Alexander Lindeman	(Guatemala) Ruben Castellanos (Guatemala) Anibal Marroquin
Men's doubles	(Canada) Jason Anthony Ho-Shue (Canada) Nyl Yakura	(Canada) Austin James Bauer (Canada) Ty Alexander Lindeman	(Peru) Mario Cuba (Peru) Diego Mini
Women's doubles	(Canada) Michelle Tong (Canada) Josephine Wu	(Peru) Daniela Macias (Peru) Danica Nishimura	(Canada) Anne-Julie Beaulieu (Canada) Stephanie Pakenham
Women's doubles	(Canada) Michelle Tong (Canada) Josephine Wu	(Peru) Daniela Macias (Peru) Danica Nishimura	(Peru) Paula La Torre Regal (Peru) Daniela Zapata
Mixed doubles	(Canada) Toby Ng (Canada) Rachel Honderich	(Canada) Nyl Yakura (Canada) Brittney Tam	(Peru) Mario Cuba (Peru) Katherine Winder
Mixed doubles	(Canada) Toby Ng (Canada) Rachel Honderich	(Canada) Nyl Yakura (Canada) Brittney Tam	(Mexico) Lino Munoz (Mexico) Cynthia Gonzalez
