= Nathan Osborne =

Canadian badminton player (born 1995)

Personal information
- Born: Nathan Ngai Han Osborne; 29 June 1995 (age 31)

Sport
- Country: Canada
- Sport: Badminton

Men's
- Highest ranking: 319 (MS) 5 Dec 2013; 585 (MD) 21 Mar 2013; 112 (XD) 13 Mar 2014
- BWF profile
Medal record
Badminton
Representing Canada
Pan Am Championships
Silver medal – second place	2016 Campinas	Mixed doubles
Pan Am Junior Championships
Gold medal – first place	2013 Puerto Vallarta	Mixed doubles
Gold medal – first place	2013 Puerto Vallarta	Mixed team
Silver medal – second place	2012 Edmonton	Mixed team
Bronze medal – third place	2012 Edmonton	Boys' doubles
Bronze medal – third place	2012 Edmonton	Mixed doubles

Nathan Ngai Han Osborne (born 29 June 1995) is a Canadian male badminton player. In 2013, he won gold medals at the Pan Am Junior Badminton Championships in mixed doubles and team events. In 2016, he won a silver medal at the Pan Am Badminton Championships in mixed doubles event partnered with Josephine Wu.

== Achievements ==
=== Pan Am Championships ===
Mixed Doubles
Year	Venue	Partner	Opponent	Score	Result
2016	Clube Fonte São Paulo; Campinas, Brazil	(Canada) Josephine Wu	(Canada) Nyl Yakura (Canada) Brittney Tam	17-21, 17-21	Silver

=== Pan Am Junior Championships ===
Boys' Doubles
Year	Venue	Partner	Opponent	Score	Result
2012	Millennium Place; Edmonton, Canada	(Canada) Mac Lee	(United States) Phillip Chew (United States) Jeffrey Kuo	14-21, 14-21	Bronze

Mixed Doubles
Year	Venue	Partner	Opponent	Score	Result
2013	Puerto Vallarta, Mexico	(Canada) Josephine Wu	(United States) Kevin Chan (United States) Christine Yang	21-16, 15–21, 21-18	Gold
2012	Millennium Place; Edmonton, Canada	(Canada) Josephine Wu	(United States) Phillip Chew (United States) Iris Wang	19-21, 16-21	Bronze
