= Badminton at the 2019 Pan American Games – Men's doubles =

Badminton – Men's doubles at the 2019 Pan American Games
- Venue: Polideportivo 3
- Dates: July 30 – August 2
- Competitors: 26 from 12 nations

Medalists
Gold medal	Jason Ho-Shue; Nyl Yakura	Canada
Silver medal	Phillip Chew; Ryan Chew	United States
Bronze medal	Osleni Guerrero; Leodannis Martínez	Cuba
Bronze medal	Fabricio Farias; Francielton Farias	Brazil

The men's doubles badminton event at the 2019 Pan American Games will be held from July 30 – August 2 at the Polideportivo 3 in Lima, Peru. The defending Pan American Games champion is Phillip Chew and Sattawat Pongnairat of the United States.

Each National Olympic Committee could enter a maximum of four athletes (two pairs) into the competition. The athletes will be drawn into an elimination stage draw. Once a team lost a match, it will be not longer be able to compete. Each match will be contested as the best of three games.

== Seeds ==
The following pairs were seeded:

1. Jason Ho-Shue / Nyl Yakura (CAN) (champions)
2. Phillip Chew / Ryan Chew (USA) (final)

== Results ==
=== Bracket ===
First Round
M Cuba (PER); D Mini (PER)	21	21
C Araya (CHI); I Leon (CHI)	12	13
W Cabrera (DOM); N Javier (DOM)	14	15
O Guerrero (CUB); L Martínez (CUB)	21	21
J Guevara (PER); D la Torre (PER)	12	21	12
Fa Farias (BRA); Fr Farias (BRA)	21	19	21
D Darmohoetomo (SUR); S Opti (SUR)	7	9
J Solís (GUA); R Ramirez (GUA)	21	21
A López (MEX); L Montoya (MEX)	21	21
D Howell (BAR); D Thorpe (BAR)	14	14

Quarterfinals
1	J Ho-Shue (CAN); N Yakura (CAN)	21	21
M Cuba (PER); D Mini (PER)	13	10
G Henry (JAM); S Ricketts (JAM)	19	9
O Guerrero (CUB); L Martínez (CUB)	21	21
Fa Farias (BRA); Fr Farias (BRA)	21	19	21
J Solís (GUA); R Ramirez (GUA)	19	21	16
A López (MEX); L Montoya (MEX)	16	17
2	P Chew (USA); R Chew (USA)	21	21

Semifinals
1	J Ho-Shue (CAN); N Yakura (CAN)	23	21
O Guerrero (CUB); L Martínez (CUB)	21	15
Fa Farias (BRA); Fr Farias (BRA)	22	13	17
2	P Chew (USA); R Chew (USA)	20	21	21

Final
1	J Ho-Shue (CAN); N Yakura (CAN)	21	19	'21
2	P Chew (USA); R Chew (USA)	11	21	18
