= 2016 Pan Am Badminton Championships =

Tournament details
- Dates: 28 April - 1 May 2016
- Venue: Clube Fonte São Paulo
- Location: Campinas, Brazil

The XX 2016 Pan Am Badminton Championships were held in Campinas, Brazil, between 28 April and 1 May 2016.

== Venue ==
- Clube Fonte São Paulo, within the Vila Itapura of Campinas, São Paulo, Brazil.

== Medalists ==
Event	Gold	Silver	Bronze
Teams	Canada	Brazil	Peru
Men's singles	(Canada) Jason Ho-Shue	(Brazil) Artur Pomoceno	(Chile) Iván León
Men's singles	(Canada) Jason Ho-Shue	(Brazil) Artur Pomoceno	(Brazil) Alex Yuwan Tjong
Women's singles	(Canada) Brittney Tam	(Canada) Stephanie Pakenham	(Peru) Daniela Macias
Women's singles	(Canada) Brittney Tam	(Canada) Stephanie Pakenham	(Brazil) Paloma da Silva
Men's doubles	(Canada) Jason Ho-Shue and Nyl Yakura	(Canada) Phillipe Gaumond and Maxime Marin	(Chile) Cristian Araya and Iván León
Men's doubles	(Canada) Jason Ho-Shue and Nyl Yakura	(Canada) Phillipe Gaumond and Maxime Marin	(Brazil) Felippe Cury and Igor Ibrahim
Women's doubles	(Canada) Michelle Tong and Josephine Wu	(Peru) Paula la Torre and Luz Maria Zornoza	
Women's doubles	(Canada) Michelle Tong and Josephine Wu	(Peru) Paula la Torre and Luz Maria Zornoza	(Peru) Daniela Macias and Danica Nishimura
Mixed doubles	(Canada) Nyl Yakura and Brittney Tam	(Canada) Nathan Osborne and Josephine Wu	(Jamaica) Dennis Coke and Katherine Wynter
Mixed doubles	(Canada) Nyl Yakura and Brittney Tam	(Canada) Nathan Osborne and Josephine Wu	(Peru) Diego Mini and Luz Maria Zornoza
