= Anne-Julie Beaulieu =

Canadian badminton player

Personal information
- Born: September 26, 1994 (age 31) Quebec City, Quebec
- Height: 5 ft 6 in (168 cm)

Sport
- Country: Canada
- Sport: Badminton
- Club: CB Rouge et Or
- Coached by: Étienne Couture
Medal record
Badminton
Representing Canada
Pan American Championships
Gold medal – first place	2017 Santo Domingo	Team event
Gold medal – first place	2018 Tacarigua	Women's team
Bronze medal – third place	2014 Markham	Women's doubles
Bronze medal – third place	2017 Santo Domingo	Women's doubles

Anne-Julie Beaulieu (born September 26, 1994) is a Canadian badminton player who competes in international level events.
