= Matthew Carder =

Scottish badminton player (born 1993)

Personal information
- Born: 16 June 1993 (age 33) Livingston, Scotland
- Height: 1.71 m (5 ft 7 in)
- Weight: 73 kg (161 lb)

Sport
- Country: Scotland
- Sport: Badminton
- Handedness: Right
- Coached by: Yvette Yun Luo

Men's singles & doubles
- Highest ranking: 115 (MS 07 January 2017); 287 (MD 5 April 2012); 548 (XD 20 August 2015)
- BWF profile

Matthew Carder (born 16 June 1993) is a Scottish badminton player. He won the 2016 Scottish National Championships in the men's singles event.

== Achievements ==
=== BWF International Challenge/Series ===
Men's singles
Year	Tournament	Opponent	Score	Result
2016	Slovak Open	(Bulgaria) Ivan Rusev	11–6, 11–7, 11–6	(gold) Winner
2017	Slovak Open	(Slovenia) Andraž Krapež	21–15, 18–21, 22–24	(silver) Runner-up

BWF International Challenge tournament
BWF International Series tournament
BWF Future Series tournament
