= Ryan Chew =

American badminton player (born 1996)

Ryan Chew 周赖恩
Personal information
- Born: August 12, 1996 (age 30)
- Height: 5 ft 10 in (1.78 m)

Sport
- Country: United States
- Sport: Badminton

Men's doubles
- Highest ranking: 35 (MD with Phillip Chew) (May 4, 2021)
- Current ranking: 35 (MD with Phillip Chew) (August 10, 2021)
- BWF profile
Medal record
Men's badminton
Representing United States
Pan American Games
Silver medal – second place	2019 Lima	Men's doubles
Pan Am Championships
Gold medal – first place	2021 Guatemala City	Men's doubles
Silver medal – second place	2018 Guatemala City	Men's doubles
Pan Am Mixed Team Championships
Silver medal – second place	2019 Lima	Mixed team
Pan Am Men's Team Championships
Silver medal – second place	2018 Tacarigua	Men's team
Bronze medal – third place	2020 Salvador	Men's team

Ryan Chew (born August 12, 1996) is an American badminton player. He won the 2021 Pan Am Championships doubles with his brother Phillip Chew. He trains at the Orange County Badminton Club, which is founded by his grandfather, Don Chew. He competed at the 2020 Tokyo Summer Games.

== Achievements ==
=== Pan American Games ===
Men's doubles
Year	Venue	Partner	Opponent	Score	Result
2019	Polideportivo 3 Lima, Peru	(United States) Phillip Chew	(Canada) Jason Ho-Shue (Canada) Nyl Yakura	11–21, 21–19, 18–21	Silver

=== Pan Am Championships ===
Men's doubles
Year	Venue	Partner	Opponent	Score	Result
2018	Teodoro Palacios Flores Gymnasium; Guatemala City, Guatemala	(United States) Phillip Chew	(Canada) Jason Ho-Shue (Canada) Nyl Yakura	17–21, 17–21	Silver
2021	Sagrado Corazon de Jesus; Guatemala City, Guatemala	(United States) Phillip Chew	(Canada) Jason Ho-Shue (Canada) Nyl Yakura	Walkover	Gold

=== BWF International Challenge/Series ===
Men's doubles
Year	Tournament	Partner	Opponent	Score	Result
2017	Carebaco International	(United States) Phillip Chew	(Jamaica) Gareth Henry (Jamaica) Samuel O'Brien Ricketts	21–12, 14–21, 12–21	(silver) Runner-up
2017	Guatemala International	(United States) Phillip Chew	(Guatemala) Rodolfo Ramírez (Guatemala) Jonathan Solís	21–10, 21–16	(gold) Winner
2018	Yonex / K&D Graphics International	(United States) Phillip Chew	(Chinese Taipei) Lu Chia-hung (Chinese Taipei) Lu Chia-pin	18–21, 10–21	(silver) Runner-up
