= Phillipe Gaumond =

Canadian badminton player

Philippe Gaumond
Personal information
- Nickname: Fuge
- Born: 8 August 1988 (age 37) Saint-Hyacinthe, Quebec, Canada
- Weight: 80 kg (176 lb)

Sport
- Country: Canada
- Sport: Badminton

Men's doubles
- Highest ranking: 185 (19 April 2012)
- BWF profile
Medal record
Badminton
Representing Canada
Pan Am Championships
Gold medal – first place	2017 Santo Domingo	Mixed team
Gold medal – first place	2016 Campinas	Mixed team
Silver medal – second place	2016 Campinas	Men's doubles

Philippe Gaumond (born 8 August 1988) is a Canadian male badminton player. In 2013, he competed at the Summer Universiade in Kazan, Russia. In 2016, he won the gold medal in mixed team event at the Pan Am Badminton Championships. In the individual event, he won the silver medal in men's doubles event partnered with Maxime Marin.

== Achievements ==
=== Pan Am Championships ===
Men's Doubles

Year	Venue	Partner	Opponent	Score	Result
2016	Clube Fonte São Paulo, Campinas, Brazil	(Canada) Maxime Marin	(Canada) Jason Ho-shue (Canada) Nyl Yakura	13–21, 13–21	Silver
