= Austin Bauer =

Canadian badminton player (born 1997)

Personal information
- Born: Austin James Bauer; 7 February 1997 (age 29) Calgary, Alberta, Canada
- Height: 1.83 m (6 ft 0 in)
- Weight: 70 kg (154 lb)

Sport
- Country: Canada
- Sport: Badminton

Men's & mixed doubles
- Highest ranking: 150 (MD 2 February 2018); 660 (XD 22 September 2016)
- BWF profile
Medal record
Men's badminton
Representing Canada
Pan Am Championships
Silver medal – second place	2017 Havana	Men's doubles
Pan Am Men's Team Championships
Gold medal – first place	2018 Tacarigua	Men's team
Pan Am Junior Championships
Silver medal – second place	2015 Tijuana	Boys' doubles

Austin James Bauer (born 7 February 1997) is a Canadian badminton player. He started playing badminton at aged 5, and in 2014, he competed at the World Junior Championships in Malaysia. Bauer trained at the Calgary Winter Club in a beginners group, then he moved to the ClearOne badminton club. He won silver at the 2017 Pan Am Badminton Championships for men's doubles with his partner, Ty Alexander Lindeman.

== Achievements ==
=== Pan Am Championships ===
Men's doubles
Year	Venue	Partner	Opponent	Score	Result
2017	Sports City Coliseum; Havana, Cuba	(Canada) Ty Alexander Lindeman	(Canada) Jason Ho-Shue (Canada) Nyl Yakura	18–21, 6–21	Silver

=== Pan Am Junior Championships ===
Boys' doubles
Year	Venue	Partner	Opponent	Score	Result
2015	Centro de Alto Rendimiento; Tijuana, Mexico	(Canada) Ty Alexander Lindeman	(Canada) Jason Ho-Shue (Canada) Jonathan Lai	15–21, 16–21	Silver
