= Maxime Marin =

Canadian badminton player (born 1992)

Personal information
- Born: 16 July 1992 (age 33)

Sport
- Country: Canada
- Sport: Badminton

Men's doubles
- Highest ranking: 399 (2 June 2016)
- BWF profile
Medal record
Men's badminton
Representing Canada
Pan Am Championships
Gold medal – first place	2017 Santo Domingo	Mixed team
Gold medal – first place	2016 Campinas	Mixed team
Silver medal – second place	2016 Campinas	Men's doubles

Maxime Marin (born 16 July 1992) is a Canadian male badminton player. In 2015, he competed at the Summer Universiade in Gwangju, South Korea. In 2016, he won the gold medal in mixed team event at the Pan Am Badminton Championships. In the individual event, he won the silver medal in men's doubles event partnered with Phillipe Gaumond.

== Achievements ==
=== Pan Am Championships ===
Men's doubles

Year	Venue	Partner	Opponent	Score	Result
2016	Clube Fonte São Paulo, Campinas, Brazil	(Canada) Phillipe Gaumond	(Canada) Jason Ho-shue (Canada) Nyl Yakura	13–21, 13–21	Silver
