= Stéphanie Pakenham =

Canadian badminton player (born 1990)

Personal information
- Born: 29 November 1990 (age 35)
- Height: 1.68 m (5 ft 6 in)

Sport
- Country: Canada
- Sport: Badminton

Women's singles & doubles
- Highest ranking: 310 (WS 21 Jun 2012); 227 (WD 9 Nov 2017); 246 (XD 13 Sep 2012)
- BWF profile
Medal record
Women's badminton
Representing Canada
Pan Am Championships
Gold medal – first place	2017 Santo Domingo	Mixed team
Gold medal – first place	2016 Campinas	Mixed team
Silver medal – second place	2016 Campinas	Women's singles
Bronze medal – third place	2017 Havana	Women's doubles
Pan Am Women's Team Championships
Gold medal – first place	2018 Tacarigua	Women's team

Stéphanie Pakenham (born 29 November 1990) is a Canadian female badminton player. In 2016, she won the gold medal in the mixed team event at the Pan Am Badminton Championships. In the individual event, she won the silver medal in the women's singles event.

== Achievements ==
=== Pan Am Championships ===
Women's singles
Year	Venue	Opponent	Score	Result
2016	Clube Fonte São Paulo; Campinas, Brazil	(Canada) Brittney Tam	11–21, 19–21	Silver

Women's doubles
Year	Venue	Partner	Opponent	Score	Result
2017	Sports City Coliseum; Havana, Cuba	(Canada) Anne-Julie Beaulieu	(Peru) Daniela Macias (Peru) Danica Nishimura	21–19, 20–22, 15–21	Bronze
