= Brittney Tam =

Canadian badminton player (born 1997)

Brittney Tam 谭碧贤
Personal information
- Born: Brittney Shannon Tam; 23 August 1997 (age 29) Toronto, Canada
- Years active: 2014
- Height: 1.70 m (5 ft 7 in)
- Weight: 60 kg (132 lb)

Sport
- Country: Canada
- Sport: Badminton
- Handedness: Right
- Coached by: Kevin Cao

Women's singles & doubles
- Highest ranking: 43 (WS 24 December 2019); 326 (WD 14 April 2016); 74 (XD 18 June 2015)
- Current ranking: 79 (WS 9 August 2022)
- BWF profile
Medal record
Women's badminton
Representing Canada
Pan Am Championships
Gold medal – first place	2014 Markham	Mixed team
Gold medal – first place	2016 Campinas	Mixed team
Gold medal – first place	2016 Campinas	Women's singles
Gold medal – first place	2016 Campinas	Mixed doubles
Gold medal – first place	2017 Santo Domingo	Mixed team
Gold medal – first place	2019 Lima	Mixed team
Silver medal – second place	2017 Havana	Women's singles
Silver medal – second place	2017 Havana	Mixed doubles
Silver medal – second place	2019 Aguascalientes	Women's singles
Bronze medal – third place	2018 Guatemala City	Women's singles
Pan Am Women's Team Championships
Gold medal – first place	2018 Tacarigua	Women's team
Gold medal – first place	2020 Salvador	Women's team
Pan Am Junior Championships
Gold medal – first place	2013 Puerto Vallarta	Mixed team
Silver medal – second place	2012 Edmonton	Mixed doubles
Silver medal – second place	2012 Edmonton	Mixed team

Brittney Shannon Tam (born 23 August 1997) is a Canadian badminton player. In 2012, she won a silver medal at the Pan Am Junior Badminton Championships in the mixed doubles event. In 2016, she won the gold medal in the mixed team event at the Pan Am Badminton Championships. In the individual event, she won the gold medals in the women's singles and mixed doubles event. She competed at the 2018 Commonwealth Games in Gold Coast.

== Achievements ==
=== Pan Am Championships ===
Women's singles
Year	Venue	Opponent	Score	Result
2016	Clube Fonte São Paulo; Campinas, Brazil	(Canada) Stephanie Pakenham	21–11, 21–19	Gold
2017	Sports City Coliseum; Havana, Cuba	(Canada) Rachel Honderich	8–21, 21–12, 7–21	Silver
2018	Teodoro Palacios Flores Gymnasium; Guatemala City, Guatemala	(Canada) Michelle Li	10–21, 18–21	Bronze
2019	Gimnasio Olímpico; Aguascalientes, Mexico	(Canada) Michelle Li	15–21, 22–24	Silver

Mixed doubles
Year	Venue	Partner	Opponent	Score	Result
2016	Clube Fonte São Paulo; Campinas, Brazil	(Canada) Nyl Yakura	(Canada) Nathan Osborne (Canada) Josephine Wu	21–17, 21–17	Gold
2017	Sports City Coliseum; Havana, Cuba	(Canada) Nyl Yakura	(Canada) Toby Ng (Canada) Rachel Honderich	13–21, 14–21	Silver

=== Pan Am Junior Championships ===
Mixed doubles
Year	Venue	Partner	Opponent	Score	Result
2012	Millennium Place; Edmonton, Canada	(Canada) Joshua Hurlburt-Yu	(United States) Phillip Chew (United States) Iris Wang	24–22, 17–21, 22–24	Silver

=== BWF International Challenge/Series (1 title, 1 runner-up) ===
Women's singles
Year	Tournament	Opponent	Score	Result
2017	Waikato International	(Chinese Taipei) Huang Yin-hsuan	17–21, 25–23, 21–16	(gold) Winner
2019	Yonex / K&D Graphics International	(Vietnam) Vũ Thị Trang	14–21, 22–20, 11–21	(silver) Runner-up

BWF International Challenge tournament
BWF International Series tournament
