= Nyl Yakura =

Canadian badminton player (born 1993)

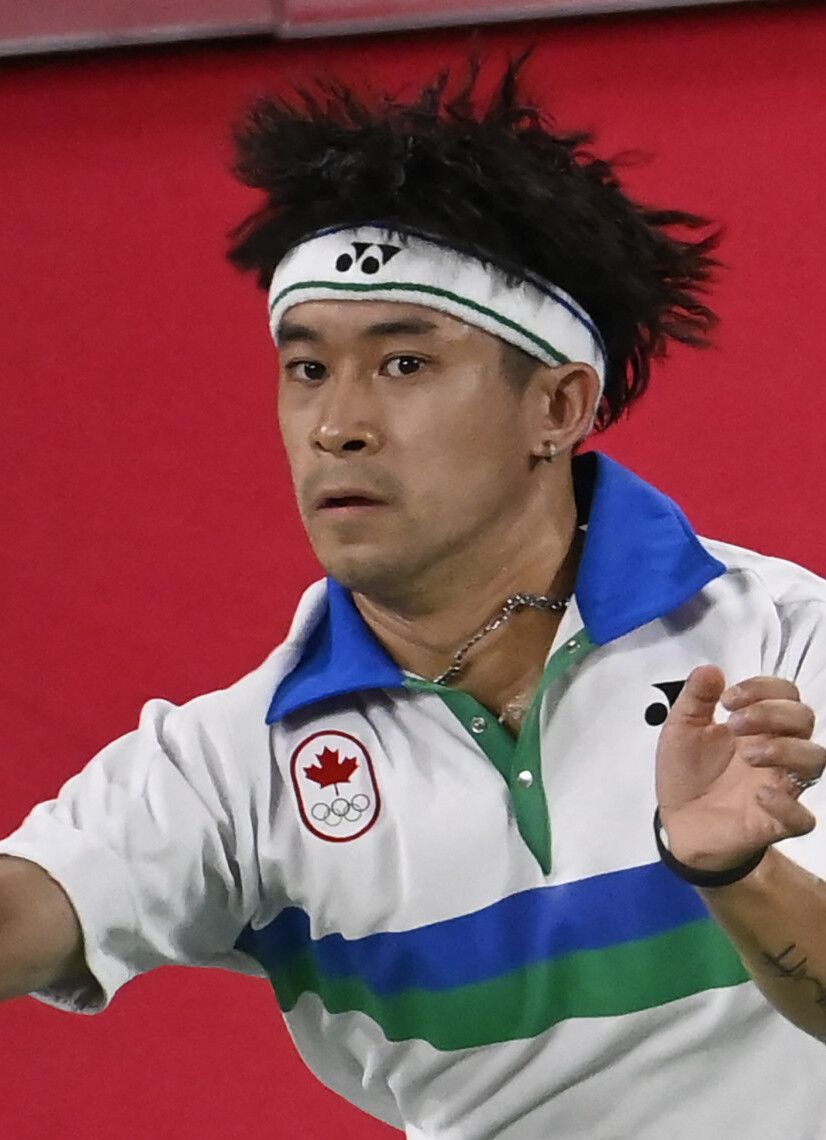
- Yakura at the 2020 Summer Olympics

Personal information
- Born: Nyl Kiyoshi Yakura; 14 February 1993 (age 33) Scarborough, Ontario, Canada
- Height: 1.70 m (5 ft 7 in)
- Weight: 150 lb (68 kg)

Sport
- Country: Canada
- Sport: Badminton
- Handedness: Right
- Coached by: Kevin Cao

Men's & mixed doubles
- Highest ranking: 181 (MS, 13 December 2012); 29 (MD with Jason Ho-Shue, 28 June 2018); 59 (XD with Kristen Tsai, 24 September 2019)
- Current ranking: 69 (MD with Jonathan Lai, 20 May 2025)
- BWF profile
Medal record
Men's badminton
Representing Canada
Pan American Games
Gold medal – first place	2019 Lima	Men's doubles
Gold medal – first place	2023 Santiago	Men's doubles
Silver medal – second place	2019 Lima	Mixed doubles
Pan Am Championships
Gold medal – first place	2016 Campinas	Men's doubles
Gold medal – first place	2016 Campinas	Mixed doubles
Gold medal – first place	2017 Havana	Men's doubles
Gold medal – first place	2018 Guatemala City	Men's doubles
Gold medal – first place	2019 Aguascalientes	Men's doubles
Gold medal – first place	2023 Kingston	Men's doubles
Silver medal – second place	2013 Santo Domingo	Men's doubles
Silver medal – second place	2017 Havana	Mixed doubles
Silver medal – second place	2018 Guatemala City	Mixed doubles
Silver medal – second place	2021 Guatemala City	Men's doubles
Silver medal – second place	2024 Guatemala City	Men's doubles
Bronze medal – third place	2019 Aguascalientes	Mixed doubles
Bronze medal – third place	2022 San Salvador	Men's doubles
Bronze medal – third place	2022 San Salvador	Mixed doubles
Bronze medal – third place	2025 Lima	Men's doubles
Pan Am Mixed Team Championships
Gold medal – first place	2013 Santo Domingo	Mixed team
Gold medal – first place	2014 Markham	Mixed team
Gold medal – first place	2016 Campinas	Mixed team
Gold medal – first place	2017 Santo Domingo	Mixed team
Gold medal – first place	2019 Lima	Mixed team
Gold medal – first place	2023 Guadalajara	Mixed team
Gold medal – first place	2025 Aguascalientes	Mixed team
Pan Am Male Cup
Gold medal – first place	2018 Tacarigua	Men's team
Gold medal – first place	2020 Salvador	Men's team
Gold medal – first place	2022 Acapulco	Men's team
Gold medal – first place	2024 São Paulo	Men's team
Gold medal – first place	2026 Guatemala City	Men's team
Pan Am Junior Championships
Gold medal – first place	2010 Santo Domingo	Boys' singles
Gold medal – first place	2010 Santo Domingo	Boys' doubles
Gold medal – first place	2010 Santo Domingo	Mixed doubles
Gold medal – first place	2011 Kingston	Boys' doubles
Gold medal – first place	2011 Kingston	Mixed doubles
Gold medal – first place	2011 Kingston	Mixed team

Nyl Kiyoshi Yakura (born 14 February 1993) is a Canadian badminton player. He captured two gold medals at the Pan American Games, winning the men's doubles title in 2019 and 2023, and also a silver in the mixed doubles in 2019. Yakura, who grew up in Pickering, Ontario, currently lives in Toronto and trains at the KC Badminton Club in Markham. He has Japanese and Indonesian heritage.

== Career ==
Yakura competed at the 2018 Commonwealth Games.

In June 2021, Yakura was named to Canada's Olympic team. Competing in the men's doubles event with Jason Ho-Shue, his pace was stopped in the group stage.

== Achievements ==
=== Pan American Games ===
Men's doubles
Year	Venue	Partner	Opponent	Score	Result
2019	Polideportivo 3 Lima, Peru	(Canada) Jason Ho-Shue	(United States) Phillip Chew (United States) Ryan Chew	21–11, 19–21, 21–18	Gold
2023	Olympic Training Center; Santiago, Chile	(Canada) Adam Dong	(Brazil) Fabrício Farias (Brazil) Davi Silva	19–21, 21–15, 21–18	Gold

Mixed doubles
Year	Venue	Partner	Opponent	Score	Result
2019	Polideportivo 3 Lima, Peru	(Canada) Kristen Tsai	(Canada) Joshua Hurlburt-Yu (Canada) Josephine Wu	21–18, 12–21, 15–21	Silver

=== Pan Am Championships ===
Men's doubles
Year	Venue	Partner	Opponent	Score	Result
2013	Palacio de los Deportes Virgilio Travieso Soto; Santo Domingo, Dominican Republic	(Canada) Kevin Li	(Canada) Adrian Liu (Canada) Derrick Ng	21–17, 6–21, 16–21	Silver
2016	Clube Fonte São Paulo; Campinas, Brazil	(Canada) Jason Ho-Shue	(Canada) Phillipe Gaumond (Canada) Maxime Marin	21–13, 21–13	Gold
2017	Sports City Coliseum; Havana, Cuba	(Canada) Jason Ho-Shue	(Canada) Austin Bauer (Canada) Ty Alexander Lindeman	21–18, 21–6	Gold
2018	Teodoro Palacios Flores Gymnasium; Guatemala City, Guatemala	(Canada) Jason Ho-Shue	(United States) Phillip Chew (United States) Ryan Chew	21–17, 21–17	Gold
2019	Gimnasio Olímpico; Aguascalientes, Mexico	(Canada) Jason Ho-Shue	(Cuba) Osleni Guerrero (Cuba) Leodannis Martínez	21–11, 20–22, 21–10	Gold
2021	Sagrado Corazon de Jesus; Guatemala City, Guatemala	(Canada) Jason Ho-Shue	(United States) Phillip Chew (United States) Ryan Chew	Walkover	Silver
2022	Palacio de los Deportes Carlos "El Famoso" Hernández; San Salvador, El Salvador	(Canada) Adam Dong	(Mexico) Job Castillo (Mexico) Luis Montoya	21–17, 19–21, 13–21	Bronze
2023	G.C. Foster College of Physical Education and Sport; Kingston, Jamaica	(Canada) Adam Dong	(Canada) Kevin Lee (Canada) Ty Alexander Lindeman	21–10, 16–21, 22–20	Gold
2024	Teodoro Palacios Flores Gymnasium; Guatemala City, Guatemala	(Canada) Adam Dong	(United States) Chen Zhi-yi (United States) Presley Smith	14–21, 11–21	Silver
2025	Videna Poli 2 Lima, Peru	(Canada) Jonathan Lai	(United States) Chen Zhi-yi (United States) Presley Smith	10–21, 23–21, 11–21	Bronze

Mixed doubles
Year	Venue	Partner	Opponent	Score	Result
2016	Clube Fonte São Paulo; Campinas, Brazil	(Canada) Brittney Tam	(Canada) Nathan Osborne (Canada) Josephine Wu	21–17, 21–17	Gold
2017	Sports City Coliseum; Havana, Cuba	(Canada) Brittney Tam	(Canada) Toby Ng (Canada) Rachel Honderich	13–21, 14–21	Silver
2018	Teodoro Palacios Flores Gymnasium; Guatemala City, Guatemala	(Canada) Kristen Tsai	(Canada) Ty Alexander Lindeman (Canada) Josephine Wu	14–21, 24–26	Silver
2019	Gimnasio Olímpico; Aguascalientes, Mexico	(Canada) Kristen Tsai	(Brazil) Fabrício Farias (Brazil) Jaqueline Lima	22–24, 19–21	Bronze
2022	Palacio de los Deportes Carlos "El Famoso" Hernández; San Salvador, El Salvador	(Canada) Crystal Lai	(Canada) Ty Alexander Lindeman (Canada) Josephine Wu	14–21, 15–21	Bronze

=== Pan Am Junior Championships ===
Boys' singles
Year	Venue	Opponent	Score	Result
2010	Santo Domingo, Dominican Republic	(Brazil) Luiz Enrique Dias Dos Santos Junior	18–21, 21–18, 21–11	Gold

Boys' doubles
Year	Venue	Partner	Opponent	Score	Result
2010	Santo Domingo, Dominican Republic	(Canada) Henry Wiebe	(Canada) Neil Tai-Pow (Canada) Andrew Wilkinson	21–8, 21–18	Gold
2011	National Indoor Sports Centre; Kingston, Jamaica	(Canada) Clinton Wong	(Canada) Andrew Lau (Canada) Andrew Wilkinson	16–21, 21–17, 21–8	Gold

Mixed doubles
Year	Venue	Partner	Opponent	Score	Result
2010	Santo Domingo, Dominican Republic	(Canada) Adrianna Giuffre	(Canada) Michael Diamond (Canada) Surabhi Kadam	19–21, 21–16, 21–16	Gold
2011	National Indoor Sports Centre; Kingston, Jamaica	(Canada) Adrianna Giuffre	(Canada) Andrew Wilkinson (Canada) Jody Chan	21–18, 17–21, 21–16	Gold

=== BWF International Challenge/Series (5 titles, 6 runners-up) ===
Men's doubles
Year	Tournament	Partner	Opponent	Score	Result
2016	Yonex / K&D Graphics International	(Canada) B. R. Sankeerth	(Denmark) Frederik Colberg (Denmark) Rasmus Fladberg	8–21, 21–18, 6–21	(silver) Runner-up
2017	Internacional Mexicano	(Canada) Jason Ho-Shue	(Mexico) Job Castillo (Mexico) Lino Muñoz	18–21, 21–11, 21–17	(gold) Winner
2018	Brazil International	(Canada) Jason Ho-Shue	(India) Tarun Kona (India) Saurabh Sharma	21–7 retired	(gold) Winner
2019	Yonex / K&D Graphics International	(Canada) Jason Ho-Shue	(Chinese Taipei) Chen Xin-yuan (Chinese Taipei) Lin Yu-chieh	21–23, 20–22	(silver) Runner-up
2021	Internacional Mexicano	(Canada) Adam Dong	(Italy) Fabio Caponio (Italy) Giovanni Toti	21–10, 21–10	(gold) Winner
2022	Sydney International	(Canada) Adam Dong	(Chinese Taipei) Lee Fang-chih (Chinese Taipei) Lee Fang-jen	12–21, 21–16, 16–21	(silver) Runner-up
2022	Peru Challenge	(Canada) Adam Dong	(Canada) Jason Ho-Shue (Canada) Joshua Hurlburt-Yu	15–21, 21–18, 12–21	(silver) Runner-up
2023	Peru Challenge	(Canada) Adam Dong	(Canada) Kevin Lee (Canada) Ty Alexander Lindeman	16–21, 18–21	(silver) Runner-up
2023	Canadian International	(Canada) Adam Dong	(Malaysia) Mohamad Arif Abdul Latif (Canada) Jonathan Lai	21–13, 17–21, 15–21	(silver) Runner-up
2024	Hungarian International	(Canada) Jonathan Lai	(England) Oliver Butler (England) Samuel Jones	9–21, 21–11, 21–11	(gold) Winner

Mixed doubles
Year	Tournament	Partner	Opponent	Score	Result
2017	Yonex / K&D Graphics International	(Canada) Kristen Tsai	(New Zealand) Oliver Leydon-Davis (New Zealand) Susannah Leydon-Davis	21–11, 21–8	(gold) Winner

BWF International Challenge tournament
BWF International Series tournament
BWF Future Series tournament
