= Jason Ho-Shue =

Canadian badminton player (born 1998)

Personal information
- Born: Jason Anthony Ho-Shue; 29 August 1998 (age 28) Markham, Ontario, Canada
- Years active: 2016–Present
- Height: 1.82 m (6 ft 0 in)
- Weight: 69 kg (152 lb)

Sport
- Country: Canada
- Sport: Badminton
- Handedness: Right
- Coached by: Efendi Wijaya; Mike Butler

Men's singles & doubles
- Highest ranking: 41 (MS 4 May 2021); 29 (MD with Nyl Yakura 28 June 2018)
- Current ranking: 65 (MS); 107 (MD with Joshua Hurlburt-Yu) (3 January 2023)
- BWF profile
Medal record
Men's badminton
Representing Canada
Pan American Games
| Gold medal – first place | 2019 Lima | Men's doubles |
| Bronze medal – third place | 2019 Lima | Men's singles |
Pan Am Championships
| Gold medal – first place | 2016 Campinas | Men's singles |
| Gold medal – first place | 2016 Campinas | Men's doubles |
| Gold medal – first place | 2017 Havana | Men's doubles |
| Gold medal – first place | 2018 Guatemala City | Men's doubles |
| Gold medal – first place | 2019 Aguascalientes | Men's doubles |
| Silver medal – second place | 2018 Guatemala City | Men's singles |
| Silver medal – second place | 2021 Guatemala City | Men's singles |
| Silver medal – second place | 2021 Guatemala City | Men's doubles |
| Bronze medal – third place | 2019 Aguascalientes | Men's singles |
Pan Am Mixed Team Championships
| Gold medal – first place | 2016 Campinas | Mixed team |
| Gold medal – first place | 2017 Santo Domingo | Mixed team |
| Gold medal – first place | 2019 Lima | Mixed team |
| Gold medal – first place | 2023 Guadalajara | Mixed team |
Pan Am Men's Team Championships
| Gold medal – first place | 2018 Tacarigua | Men's team |
| Gold medal – first place | 2020 Salvador | Men's team |
Pan Am Junior Championships
| Gold medal – first place | 2015 Tijuana | Boys' singles |
| Gold medal – first place | 2015 Tijuana | Boys' doubles |
| Gold medal – first place | 2015 Tijuana | Mixed doubles |
| Bronze medal – third place | 2015 Tijuana | Mixed team |

Jason Anthony Ho-Shue (born 29 August 1998) is a Canadian badminton player. He won the gold medal in the men's doubles at the 2019 Pan American Games, and at the Pan Am Championships in 2016, 2017, 2018 and 2019. He also won the men's singles title at the Pan Am Championships in 2016.

== Career ==
In 2015, he settled triple crowns at the Pan Am Junior Badminton Championships in boys' singles, doubles, and mixed doubles event. In the mixed team event, he won the bronze medal. In 2016, he became the youngest Canadian badminton player who won the national title in men's singles event. He also won double titles at the XX Pan Am Individual Championships in men's singles and doubles event. He represented his country competed at the 2018 Commonwealth Games in Gold Coast. He was a gold medalist in the men's doubles event partnered with Nyl Yakura at the 2019 Lima Pan American Games, also won a bronze medal in the men's singles.

In June 2021, Ho-Shue was named to Canada's Olympic team for the 2020 Summer Olympics. Partnered with Nyl Yakura, he was eliminated in the group stage.

== Achievements ==
=== Pan American Games ===
Men's singles
| Year | Venue | Opponent | Score | Result |
|---|---|---|---|---|
| 2019 | Polideportivo 3 Lima, Peru | (Brazil) Ygor Coelho | 22–20, 20–22, 8–21 | Bronze |

Men's doubles
| Year | Venue | Partner | Opponent | Score | Result |
|---|---|---|---|---|---|
| 2019 | Polideportivo 3 Lima, Peru | (Canada) Nyl Yakura | (United States) Phillip Chew (United States) Ryan Chew | 21–11, 19–21, 21–18 | Gold |

=== Pan Am Championships ===
Men's singles
| Year | Venue | Opponent | Score | Result |
|---|---|---|---|---|
| 2016 | Clube Fonte São Paulo; Campinas, Brazil | (Brazil) Artur Pomoceno | 21–17, 21–11 | Gold |
| 2018 | Teodoro Palacios Flores Gymnasium; Guatemala City, Guatemala | (Brazil) Ygor Coelho | 12–21, 15–21 | Silver |
| 2019 | Gimnasio Olímpico; Aguascalientes, Mexico | (Cuba) Osleni Guerrero | 21–16, 19–21, 16–21 | Bronze |
| 2021 | Sagrado Corazon de Jesus, Guatemala City, Guatemala | (Canada) Brian Yang | 13–21, 10–18 retired | Silver |

Men's doubles
| Year | Venue | Partner | Opponent | Score | Result |
|---|---|---|---|---|---|
| 2016 | Clube Fonte São Paulo; Campinas, Brazil | (Canada) Nyl Yakura | (Canada) Phillipe Gaumond (Canada) Maxime Marin | 21–13, 21–13 | Gold |
| 2017 | Sports City Coliseum; Havana, Cuba | (Canada) Nyl Yakura | (Canada) Austin Bauer (Canada) Ty Alexander Lindeman | 21–18, 21–6 | Gold |
| 2018 | Teodoro Palacios Flores Gymnasium; Guatemala City, Guatemala | (Canada) Nyl Yakura | (United States) Phillip Chew (United States) Ryan Chew | 21–17, 21–17 | Gold |
| 2019 | Gimnasio Olímpico; Aguascalientes, Mexico | (Canada) Nyl Yakura | (Cuba) Osleni Guerrero (Cuba) Leodannis Martínez | 21–11, 20–22, 21–10 | Gold |
| 2021 | Sagrado Corazon de Jesus; Guatemala City, Guatemala | (Canada) Nyl Yakura | (United States) Phillip Chew (United States) Ryan Chew | Walkover | Silver |

=== Pan Am Junior Championships ===
Boys' singles
| Year | Venue | Opponent | Score | Result |
|---|---|---|---|---|
| 2015 | Centro de Alto Rendimiento; Tijuana, Mexico | (Brazil) Artur Pomoceno | 21–18, 21–11 | Gold |

Boys' doubles
| Year | Venue | Partner | Opponent | Score | Result |
|---|---|---|---|---|---|
| 2015 | Centro de Alto Rendimiento; Tijuana, Mexico | (Canada) Jonathan Lai | (Canada) Austin Bauer (Canada) Ty Alexander Lindeman | 21–15, 21–16 | Gold |

Mixed doubles
| Year | Venue | Partner | Opponent | Score | Result |
|---|---|---|---|---|---|
| 2015 | Centro de Alto Rendimiento; Tijuana, Mexico | (Canada) Qingzi Ouyang | (Canada) Ty Alexander Lindeman (Canada) Takeisha Wang | 21–10, 21–15 | Gold |

=== BWF International Challenge/Series (5 titles, 3 runners-up) ===
Men's singles
| Year | Tournament | Opponent | Score | Result |
|---|---|---|---|---|
| 2018 | Jamaica International | (Canada) Sheng Xiaodong | 21–6, 21–13 | (gold) Winner |
| 2019 | Bahrain International | (India) Priyanshu Rajawat | 21–16, 7–21, 12–21 | (silver) Runner-up |
| 2019 | Yonex / K&D Graphics International | (Japan) Kodai Naraoka | 13–21, 14–21 | (silver) Runner-up |
| 2022 | Peru Challenge | (Spain) Luis Enrique Peñalver | 21–19, 21–23, 23–21 | (gold) Winner |

Men's doubles
| Year | Tournament | Partner | Opponent | Score | Result |
|---|---|---|---|---|---|
| 2017 | Mexican International | (Canada) Nyl Yakura | (Mexico) Job Castillo (Mexico) Lino Muñoz | 18–21, 21–11, 21–17 | (gold) Winner |
| 2018 | Brazil International | (Canada) Nyl Yakura | (India) Tarun Kona (India) Saurabh Sharma | 21–7 retired | (gold) Winner |
| 2019 | Yonex / K&D Graphics International | (Canada) Nyl Yakura | (Chinese Taipei) Chen Xin-yuan (Chinese Taipei) Lin Yu-chieh | 21–23, 20–22 | (silver) Runner-up |
| 2022 | Peru Challenge | (Canada) Joshua Hurlburt-Yu | (Canada) Adam Dong (Canada) Nyl Yakura | 21–15, 18–21, 21–12 | (gold) Winner |

BWF International Challenge tournament
BWF International Series tournament
