= Kevin Cordón =

Guatemalan badminton player (born 1986)

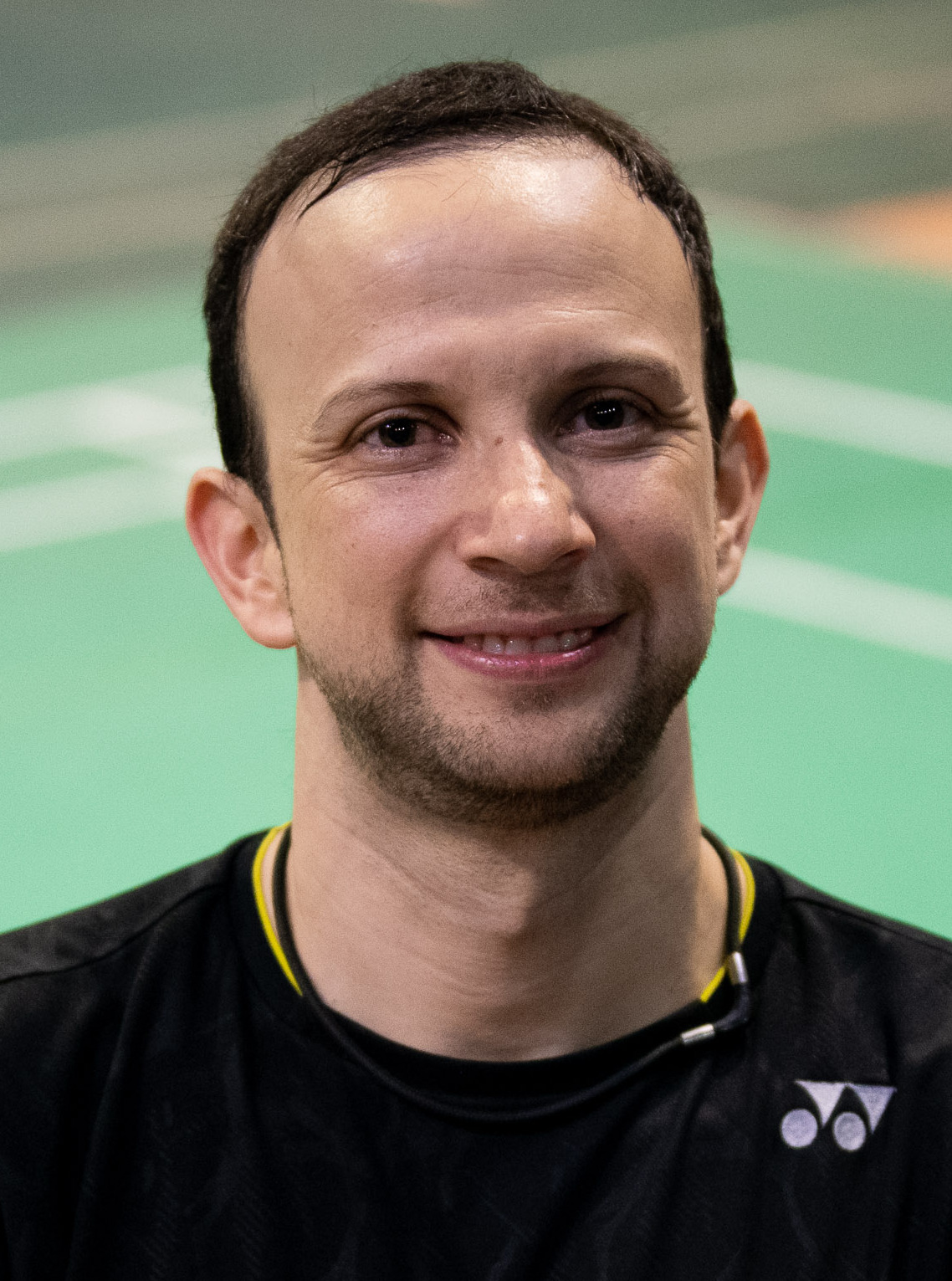
- Cordón in 2024

Personal information
- Born: Kevin Haroldo Cordón Buezo; 28 November 1986 (age 39) La Unión, Zacapa, Guatemala
- Years active: 1998–present
- Height: 5 ft 11.5 in (1.82 m)
- Weight: 150 lb (68 kg)

Sport
- Country: Guatemala
- Sport: Badminton
- Handedness: Left
- Coached by: José María Solís

Men's singles & doubles
- Highest ranking: 24 (MS, 12 April 2012); 43 (MD, 21 October 2010)
- Current ranking: 90 (MS, 3 November 2026)
- BWF profile
Medal record
Men's badminton
Representing Guatemala
Pan American Games
Gold medal – first place	2011 Guadalajara	Men's singles
Gold medal – first place	2015 Toronto	Men's singles
Silver medal – second place	2007 Rio de Janeiro	Men's singles
Bronze medal – third place	2019 Lima	Men's singles
Pan Am Championships
Gold medal – first place	2009 Guadalajara	Men's singles
Gold medal – first place	2009 Guadalajara	Men's doubles
Gold medal – first place	2012 Lima	Men's singles
Gold medal – first place	2022 San Salvador	Men's singles
Gold medal – first place	2024 Guatemala City	Men's singles
Silver medal – second place	2008 Lima	Men's doubles
Silver medal – second place	2019 Aguascalientes	Men's singles
Bronze medal – third place	2008 Lima	Men's singles
Bronze medal – third place	2014 Markham	Men's doubles
Bronze medal – third place	2018 Guatemala City	Men's singles
Bronze medal – third place	2021 Guatemala City	Men's singles
Bronze medal – third place	2023 Kingston	Men's singles
Bronze medal – third place	2025 Lima	Men's singles
Central American and Caribbean Games
Gold medal – first place	2006 Cartagena	Men's singles
Gold medal – first place	2010 Mayagüez	Men's singles
Gold medal – first place	2010 Mayagüez	Men's doubles
Gold medal – first place	2010 Mayagüez	Men's team
Gold medal – first place	2014 Veracruz	Men's singles
Gold medal – first place	2014 Veracruz	Men's doubles
Gold medal – first place	2014 Veracruz	Mixed team
Gold medal – first place	2018 Barranquilla	Men's singles
Silver medal – second place	2006 Cartagena	Men's team
Silver medal – second place	2026 Santo Domingo	Mixed team
Bronze medal – third place	2006 Cartagena	Men's doubles
Bronze medal – third place	2018 Barranquilla	Mixed team
Representing Independent Athletes Team
Pan American Games
Silver medal – second place	2023 Santiago	Men's singles

Kevin Haroldo Cordón Buezo (born 28 November 1986) is a Guatemalan badminton player. He won two men's singles titles at the Pan American Games, four titles at the Pan Am Championships (3 in singles and 1 in doubles), and six titles at the Central American and Caribbean Games (4 in singles and 2 in doubles). He is a five-time Olympian for Guatemala participating at the 2008, 2012, 2016, 2020 and the 2024 Olympic Games.

== Career ==
Born in La Unión, Zacapa, Cordón was named after former England international footballer Kevin Keegan, of whom his father was a fan. In spite of badminton not being popular in Guatemala during his childhood, he became a badminton player as he thought it would give him a better chance of one day becoming an Olympian than if he played a different sport being the first member of his family to practice the sport. He began playing at the age of 11 and by 1998 he was a part of the Zacapa Department's youth team.

After winning the silver medal at the 2007 Pan American Games, Cordón qualified to the 2008 Olympic Games and was selected as the flag bearer of his nation's Olympic team. At the Beijing Games, he lost against the #3 seeded player, Bao Chunlai from China.

At the 2010 Central American and Caribbean Games, he won three gold medals in the singles, doubles, and team events, being the Guatemalan athlete with the most medals won during the games.

Cordón then competed at the 2011 BWF World Championships in London, where he reached the quarterfinals after beating fifth-seeded Chen Long from China, Henri Hurskainen from Sweden and Pablo Abian from Spain to face the tournament's top-seeded Lee Chong Wei. There he lost to the Malaysian player in two straight sets.

Cordón was selected as the flag bearer for the Guatemalan team at the opening ceremony of the 2011 Pan American Games, and was also the top seeded player in the men's singles event. On 20 October 2011, he won his first Pan-American Games gold medal by beating Cuban competitor Osleni Guerrero in the final. Cordón did not lose one set in the tournament. In 2015, he successfully defended his men's singles Pan Am Games title at the Atos Markham Pan Am Centre in Toronto at the Pan American Games beating Canadian Andrew D'Souza 21–13, 21–14 in the final.

Cordón qualified for the 2012 Summer Olympics singles competition. He won both of his group matches, beating 15th seed Englishman Rajiv Ouseph and Swedish player Henri Hurskainen in the process, thus winning a place in the round of 16. He lost his round of 16 match versus Sho Sasaki of Japan. He qualified again to the 2016 Summer Olympics, but had to withdraw due to injury after finishing the first match, losing a tough 3-setter against Adrian Dziolko of Poland.

Cordón qualified again for the 2020 Summer Olympics. He won both of his group matches, defeating Mexican Lino Munoz and the 8th-seeded Ng Ka Long, thus winning a place in the round of 16. He defeated Mark Caljouw of the Netherlands to advance to the quarter-finals for the first time ever. In the quarter-finals, he defeated Korean Heo Kwang-hee 21–13 and 21–18 to become the first Central American to advance to the Olympic badminton semi-finals. He lost the semi-final to eventual gold medalist Viktor Axelsen of Denmark and the bronze medal match to Indonesian Anthony Sinisuka Ginting, both in straight games.

Kevin Cordón twice won the continental Pan Am Badminton Championships in the men's singles event in 2009 and 2012 and also once the men's doubles Pan Am badminton event in 2009 with compatriot Rodolfo Ramirez.

Already as a junior player in 2004, he won the continental Pan Am Junior Badminton Championships boys' singles title in the U-19 category.

On 3 July 2024, he and female sport shooter Waleska Soto were chosen by the Guatemalan Olympic Committee to be the flag bearers in the 2024 Summer Olympics opening ceremony. Playing in his fifth Olympics, he broke the Olympic record for a badminton player, along with Pablo Abián. However, after losing his first group match, he withdrew from the tournament due to injury.

In 2026, at the age of 39, Cordón won the gold medal at the Central American and Caribbean Games in Santo Domingo.

== Achievements ==
=== Pan American Games ===
Men's singles
Year	Venue	Opponent	Score	Result
2007	Riocentro Sports Complex, Pavilion 4B, Rio de Janeiro, Brazil	(Canada) Mike Beres	21–13, 11–21, 10–21	Silver
2011	Multipurpose Gymnasium, Guadalajara, Mexico	(Cuba) Osleni Guerrero	23–21, 21–19	Gold
2015	Atos Markham Pan Am Centre, Toronto, Canada	(Canada) Andrew D'Souza	21–13, 21–14	Gold
2019	Polideportivo 3, Lima, Peru	(Canada) Brian Yang	21–15, 13–21, 3–13 retired	Bronze
2023	Olympic Training Center, Santiago, Chile	(Canada) Brian Yang	18–21, 6–21	Silver

=== Pan Am Championships ===
Men's singles
Year	Venue	Opponent	Score	Result
2008	Club de Regatas, Lima, Peru	(Canada) David Snider	21–23, 21–6, 19–21	Bronze
2009	Coliseo Olímpico de la Universidad de Guadalajara, Guadalajara, Mexico	(Canada) Stephan Wojcikiewicz	21–11, 21–19	Gold
2012	Manuel Bonilla Stadium, Lima, Peru	(Cuba) Osleni Guerrero	23–21, 21–19	Gold
2018	Teodoro Palacios Flores Gymnasium, Guatemala City, Guatemala	(Canada) Jason Ho-Shue	14–21, 17–21	Bronze
2019	Gimnasio Olímpico, Aguascalientes, Mexico	(Cuba) Osleni Guerrero	11–21, 20–22	Silver
2021	Sagrado Corazon de Jesus, Guatemala City, Guatemala	(Canada) Jason Ho-Shue	17–21, 18–21	Bronze
2022	Palacio de los Deportes Carlos "El Famoso" Hernández, San Salvador, El Salvador	(Canada) Brian Yang	21–17, 21–14	Gold
2023	G.C. Foster College of Physical Education and Sport, Kingston, Jamaica	(El Salvador) Uriel Canjura	22–20, 12–21, 14–21	Bronze
2024	Teodoro Palacios Flores Gymnasium, Guatemala City, Guatemala	(El Salvador) Uriel Canjura	14–21, 21–17, 21–13	Gold
2025	Videna Poli 2, Lima, Peru	(Canada) Victor Lai	10–21, 14–21	Bronze

Men's doubles
Year	Venue	Partner	Opponent	Score	Result
2008	Club de Regatas; Lima, Peru	(Guatemala) Rodolfo Ramírez	(Canada) Toby Ng (Canada) William Milroy	16–21, 9–21	Silver
2009	Coliseo Olímpico de la Universidad de Guadalajara; Guadalajara, Mexico	(Guatemala) Rodolfo Ramírez	(Peru) Antonio de Vinatea (Peru) Martín del Valle	21–18, 17–21, 23–21	Gold
2014	Markham Pan Am Centre; Markham, Canada	(Guatemala) Aníbal Marroquín	(United States) Phillip Chew (United States) Sattawat Pongnairat	13–21, 7–21	Bronze

=== Central American and Caribbean Games ===
Men's singles
Year	Venue	Opponent	Score	Result
2006	Pavilion of Parque del Este, Santo Domingo, Dominican Republic	(Cuba) Ilian Perez		Gold
2010	Raymond Dalmau Coliseum, Mayagüez, Puerto Rico	(Guatemala) Pedro Yang	21–15, 21–12	Gold
2014	Omega Complex, Veracruz, Mexico	(Cuba) Osleni Guerrero	20–22, 21–13, 24–22	Gold
2018	Coliseo Universidad del Norte, Barranquilla, Colombia	(Cuba) Osleni Guerrero	21–16, 14–21, 25–23	Gold
2026	Pabellón de Tenis de Mesa, Santo Domingo Este, Dominican Republic	(Mexico) Luis Montoya	19–21, 21–10, 21–17	Gold

Men's doubles
Year	Venue	Partner	Opponent	Score	Result
2006	Pavilion of Parque del Este; Santo Domingo, Dominican Republic	(Guatemala) Rodolfo Ramírez	(Cuba) Lazaro Jerez (Cuba) Ilian Perez	21–12, 13–21, 15–21	Bronze
2010	Raymond Dalmau Coliseum; Mayagüez, Puerto Rico	(Guatemala) Rodolfo Ramírez	(Mexico) Andrés López (Mexico) Lino Muñoz	18–21, 21–17, 21–6	Gold
2014	Omega Complex; Veracruz, Mexico	(Guatemala) Aníbal Marroquín	(Guatemala) Rodolfo Ramírez (Guatemala) Jonathan Solís	22–20, 22–20	Gold

=== BWF International Challenge/Series (47 titles, 21 runners-up) ===
Men's singles
Year	Tournament	Opponent	Score	Result
2007	Bulgarian International	(Czech Republic) Jan Fröhlich	13–21, 7–17 retired	(silver) Runner-up
2007	Cyprus International	(India) Chetan Anand	8–21, 24–26	(silver) Runner-up
2008	Peru International	(Peru) Andrés Corpancho	21–14, 21–14	(gold) Winner
2008	Miami PanAm International	(Denmark) Christian Lind Thomsen	21–18, 21–10	(gold) Winner
2008	Brazil International	(Peru) Andrés Corpancho	21–15, 21–14	(gold) Winner
2008	Puerto Rico International	(Iran) Kaveh Mehrabi	21–13, 21–9	(gold) Winner
2009	Giraldilla International	(Indonesia) Ari Trisnanto	21–19, 14–21, 18–21	(silver) Runner-up
2009	Puerto Rico International	(Portugal) Pedro Martins	18–21, 21–13, 21–17	(gold) Winner
2009	Mexican International	(Jamaica) Charles Pyne	21–11, 21–13	(gold) Winner
2009	Santo Domingo Open	(Guatemala) Rodolfo Ramírez	21–17, 21–12	(gold) Winner
2009	Guatemala International	(Guatemala) Rodolfo Ramírez	21–16, 21–12	(gold) Winner
2010	Suriname International	(India) Abdul Aditya	23–21, 21–9	(gold) Winner
2010	Miami PanAm International	(United States) Hock Lai Lee	13–21, 21–14, 21–18	(gold) Winner
2010	Santo Domingo Open	(Portugal) Pedro Martins	10–21, 13–21	(silver) Runner-up
2010	Guatemala International	(Guatemala) Rodolfo Ramírez	21–14, 21–16	(gold) Winner
2010	Brazil International	(United States) Hock Lai Lee	13–21, 17–21	(silver) Runner-up
2011	Peru International	(Austria) Michael Lahnsteiner	23–21, 6–21, 21–12	(gold) Winner
2011	Slovenian International	(Chinese Taipei) Hsu Jen-hao	14–21, 21–19, 10–21	(silver) Runner-up
2012	Guatemala International	(United States) Howard Shu	Walkover	(gold) Winner
2012	Brazil International	(Sri Lanka) Niluka Karunaratne	17–21, 22–20, 21–19	(gold) Winner
2014	Mercosul International	(Guatemala) Rodolfo Ramírez	21–14, 21–16	(gold) Winner
2014	Argentina International	(Brazil) Daniel Paiola	21–12, 21–18	(gold) Winner
2014	Chile International	(Guatemala) Rodolfo Ramírez	9–11, 11–9, 11–2, 11–6	(gold) Winner
2014	Guatemala International	(Spain) Pablo Abián	11–4, 8–11, 5–11, 10–11	(silver) Runner-up
2015	Peru International Series	(Brazil) Daniel Paiola	21–16, 22–20	(gold) Winner
2015	Mercosul International	(Norway) Marius Myhre	21–14, 21–17	(gold) Winner
2015	Mauritius International	(Austria) Luka Wraber	21–12, 21–18	(gold) Winner
2015	Guatemala International	(Brazil) Ygor Coelho	22–20, 21–11	(gold) Winner
2015	Brazil International	(Brazil) Ygor Coelho	18–21, 22–20, 19–21	(silver) Runner-up
2015	Puerto Rico International	(United States) Howard Shu	21–17, 21–15	(gold) Winner
2016	Guatemala International	(Cuba) Osleni Guerrero	Walkover	(silver) Runner-up
2017	Yonex / K&D Graphics International	(Japan) Kento Momota	7–21, 15–21	(silver) Runner-up
2017	Carebaco International	(India) Karan Rajan Rajarajan	21–19, 21–18	(gold) Winner
2017	Internacional Mexicano	(Guatemala) Aníbal Marroquín	21–12, 21–9	(gold) Winner
2017	Guatemala International	(Cuba) Leodannis Martínez	21–17, 21–18	(gold) Winner
2018	Peru International	(Cuba) Osleni Guerrero	22–20, 14–21, 21–15	(gold) Winner
2018	International Mexicano	(Belgium) Maxime Moreels	21–19, 21–14	(gold) Winner
2018	Guatemala International	(United States) Timothy Lam	21–12, 21–13	(gold) Winner
2018	Suriname International	(Belgium) Elias Bracke	21–13, 21–15	(gold) Winner
2019	Jamaica International	(Japan) Kodai Naraoka	17–21, 8–21	(silver) Runner-up
2019	Peru International	(Canada) Brian Yang	21–15, 13–21, 12–21	(silver) Runner-up
2019	International Mexicano	(Mexico) Lino Muñoz	21–16, 21–13	(gold) Winner
2019	Guatemala International	(Mexico) Lino Muñoz	21–6, 11–3 retired	(gold) Winner
2019	Brazil International	(Mexico) Lino Muñoz	21–19, 21–19	(gold) Winner
2019	Santo Domingo Open	(Canada) Brian Yang	8–21, 4–21	(silver) Runner-up
2019	Suriname International	(Canada) Brian Yang	Walkover	(silver) Runner-up
2021	Guatemala International	(Canada) Victor Lai	21–13, 21–11	(gold) Winner
2022	Mexican International	(Brazil) Jonathan Matias	21–10, 21–13	(gold) Winner
2022	El Salvador International	(El Salvador) Uriel Canjura	18–21, 23–21, 18–21	(silver) Runner-up
2023	Brazil International	(Brazil) Ygor Coelho	22–20, 14–21, 21–16	(gold) Winner
2023	Guatemala International	(Brazil) Ygor Coelho	21–17, 11–21, 21–23	(silver) Runner-up
2023	Peru Challenge	(Japan) Takuma Kawamoto	12–21, 21–16, 14–21	(silver) Runner-up
2023	Guatemala International	(Italy) Giovanni Toti	21–8, 21–19	(gold) Winner
2023	Mexican International	(Croatia) Aria Dinata	21–15, 21–15	(gold) Winner
2023	El Salvador International	(Brazil) Ygor Coelho	21–17, 15–21, 21–19	(gold) Winner
2025	Giraldilla International	(Guatemala) Yeison del Cid	21–15, 22–24, 18–21	(silver) Runner-up
2025	Bolivia International	(Cuba) Roberto Herrera	21–11, 21–15	(gold) Winner
2025	Costa Rica Future Series	(Sri Lanka) Dumindu Abeywickrama	21–18, 12–21, 21–16	(gold) Winner
2025	Perú International	(France) Arthur Wakhevitsch	8–15, 15–12, 15–11	(gold) Winner
2025	Guatemala International	(Brazil) Jonathan Matias	No data	(silver) Runner-up

Men's doubles
Year	Tournament	Partner	Opponent	Score	Result
2009	Peru International	(Guatemala) Rodolfo Ramírez	(Spain) José Vicente Martínez (Spain) Javier Tur	16–21, 8–2 retired	(gold) Winner
2009	Puerto Rico International	(Guatemala) Rodolfo Ramírez	(United States) Phillip Chew (United States) Halim Haryanto	21–19, 13–21, 21–16	(gold) Winner
2009	Santo Domingo Open	(Guatemala) Rodolfo Ramírez	(United States) Phillip Chew (United States) Halim Haryanto	21–23, 21–15, 21–17	(gold) Winner
2009	Guatemala International	(Guatemala) Rodolfo Ramírez	(United States) Mathew Fogarthy (United States) David Neuman	21–16, 21–14	(gold) Winner
2010	Suriname International	(Guatemala) Rodolfo Ramírez	(Suriname) Virgil Soeroredjo (Suriname) Mitchel Wongsodikromo	21–14, 21–16	(gold) Winner
2010	Santo Domingo Open	(Guatemala) Rodolfo Ramírez	(Canada) Adrian Liu (Canada) Derrick Ng	21–18, 24–22	(gold) Winner
2010	Guatemala International	(Guatemala) Rodolfo Ramírez	(Canada) Adrian Liu (Canada) Derrick Ng	21–23, 20–22	(silver) Runner-up
2017	Mercosul International	(Guatemala) Aníbal Marroquín	(Guatemala) Rodolfo Ramírez (Guatemala) Jonathan Solís	21–15, 13–21, 13–21	(silver) Runner-up

BWF International Challenge tournament
BWF International Series tournament
BWF Future Series tournament

== Record against selected opponents ==
Includes results against CACSO Games finalists, Pan Am Games finalists, Pan Am Championships finalists, Super Series finalists, World Championship semifinalists, Olympic quarter-finalists, and all Olympic opponents.

- (Brazil) Ygor Coelho 4–1
- (Canada) Mike Beres 0–1
- (Canada) Andrew D'Souza 1–0
- (Canada) Jason Ho-Shue 2–2
- (Canada) Brian Yang 1–5
- (Canada) Stephan Wojcikiewicz 3–0
- (China) Bao Chunlai 0–1
- (China) Chen Long 1–0
- (Cuba) Osleni Guerrero 10–5
- (Cuba) Ilian Perez 0–1
- (Czech Republic) Jan Fröhlich 1–3
- (Denmark) Peter Gade 0–1
- (Denmark) Joachim Persson 1–1
- (Denmark) Viktor Axelsen 0–1
- (England) Rajiv Ouseph 1–1
- (Germany) Marc Zwiebler 0–2
- (Guatemala) Pedro Yang 2–0
- (Hong Kong) Ng Ka Long 1–0
- (India) Ajay Jayaram 0–2
- (India) Lakshya Sen 0–2
- (India) Parupalli Kashyap 0–1
- (Indonesia) Anthony Sinisuka Ginting 0–1
- (Indonesia) Taufik Hidayat 0–1
- (Japan) Kento Momota 0–1
- (Japan) Sho Sasaki 0–2
- (Malaysia) Lee Chong Wei 0–2
- (Mexico) Lino Muñoz 14–1
- (Netherlands) Mark Caljouw 1–1
- (Poland) Adrian Dziółko 2–1
- (South Korea) Heo Kwang-hee 1–0
- (South Korea) Lee Hyun-il 0–1
- (Spain) Pablo Abián 2–7
- (Sri Lanka) Niluka Karunaratne 2–1
- (Sweden) Henri Hurskainen 2–2
- (Thailand) Boonsak Ponsana 0–1
- (United States) Howard Shu 9–0
- (Vietnam) Nguyễn Tiến Minh 1–0

Olympic Games
Preceded by Gisela Morales	Flagbearer for Guatemala; Beijing 2008	Succeeded by Juan Ignacio Maegli
Preceded by Isabella Maegli; Juan Ignacio Maegli	Flagbearer for Guatemala; París 2024; With: Waleska Soto	Succeeded by Incumbent
