= Badminton at the 2019 Pan American Games – Men's singles =

Badminton – Men's singles at the 2019 Pan American Games
- Venue: Polideportivo 3
- Dates: July 29 – August 2
- Competitors: 35 from 19 nations

Medalists
Gold medal	Ygor Coelho	Brazil
Silver medal	Brian Yang	Canada
Bronze medal	Jason Ho-Shue	Canada
Bronze medal	Kevin Cordón	Guatemala

The men's singles badminton event at the 2019 Pan American Games will be held from July 29 – August 2 at the Polideportivo 3 in Lima, Peru. The defending Pan American Games champion is Kevin Cordón of Guatemala.

Each National Olympic Committee could enter a maximum of three athletes into the competition. The athletes will be drawn into an elimination stage draw. Once an athlete lost a match, they will be no longer able to compete. Each match will be contested as the best of three games.

== Seeds ==
The following athletes were seeded:

1. Ygor Coelho (BRA) (champion)
2. Kevin Cordón (GUA) (semifinals)
3. Jason Ho-shue (CAN) (semifinals)
4. Osleni Guerrero (CUB) (quarterfinals)
5. Brian Yang (CAN) (final)
6. Lino Munoz (MEX) (quarterfinals)
7. Timothy Lam (USA) (quarterfinals)
8. Artur Pomoceno (BRA) (second round)

== Results ==
=== Finals ===
Semifinals
1	Ygor Coelho (BRA)	20	22	21
3	Jason Ho-shue (CAN)	22	20	8
5	Brian Yang (CAN)	15	21	13
2	Kevin Cordón (GUA)	21	13	3^{r}

Final
1	Ygor Coelho (BRA)	21	21
5	Brian Yang (CAN)	19	10

=== Top half ===
==== Section 1 ====
First Round

Second Round
1	Y Coelho (BRA)	21	21
U Canjura (ESA)	19	11
D Thorpe (BAR)	8	6
L Martínez (CUB)	21	21
7	T Lam (USA)	21	21
F Barrios (VEN)	10	9
R Castellanos (GUA)	21	21
G Henry (JAM)	12	5

Third Round
1	Y Coelho (BRA)	21	22
L Martínez (CUB)	15	20
7	T Lam (USA)	21	21
R Castellanos (GUA)	9	17

Quarterfinals
1	Y Coelho (BRA)	21	21
7	T Lam (USA)	16	6

==== Section 2 ====
First Round
I Leon (CHI)	22	21
D Darmohoetomo (SUR)	20	11

Second Round
3	J Ho-shue (CAN)	21	21
W Cabrera (DOM)	5	9
F Farias (BRA)	21	18	21
R Herrera (CUB)	16	21	14
6	L Munoz (MEX)	21	21
D la Torre (PER)	17	11
G Cavallotti (CRC)	12	15
I Leon (CHI)	21	21

Third Round
3	J Ho-shue (CAN)	21	21
F Farias (BRA)	12	9
6	L Munoz (MEX)	21	21
I Leon (CHI)	10	9

Quarterfinals
3	J Ho-shue (CAN)	21	21
6	L Munoz (MEX)	14	15

=== Bottom half ===
==== Section 3 ====
First Round
N Javier (DOM)	15	19
J Guevara (PER)	21	21

Second Round
J Guevara (PER)	16	20
A López (MEX)	21	22
H Shu (USA)	21	11	6
5	B Yang (CAN)	18	21	21
S Opti (SUR)	21	13	21
A Baque (ECU)	17	21	17
N Oliva (ARG)	8	6
4	O Guerrero (CUB)	21	21

Third Round
A López (MEX)	11	10
5	B Yang (CAN)	21	21
S Opti (SUR)	20	9
4	O Guerrero (CUB)	22	21

Quarterfinals
5	B Yang (CAN)	21	15	21
4	O Guerrero (CUB)	10	21	13

==== Section 4 ====
First Round
K Seixas (PAN)	21	21
D Howell (BAR)	17	17

Second Round
K Seixas (PAN)	11	12
C Araya (CHI)	21	21
L Montoya (MEX)	22	21
8	A Pomoceno (BRA)	20	11
N Ramdhani (GUY)	13	23
S Ricketts (JAM)	21	25
C Brito (DOM)	8	18
2	K Cordón (GUA)	21	21

Third Round
C Araya (CHI)	12	14
L Montoya (MEX)	21	21
S Ricketts (JAM)	15	13
2	K Cordón (GUA)	21	21

Quarterfinals
L Montoya (MEX)	16	13
2	K Cordón (GUA)	21	21
