= Badminton at the 2023 Pan American Games – Men's singles =

Badminton – Men's singles at the 2023 Pan American Games
- Venue: Olympic Training Center
- Start date: October 21, 2023
- End date: October 25, 2023
- Competitors: 31 from 20 nations

Medalists
Gold medal	Brian Yang	Canada
Silver medal	Kevin Cordón	Independent Athletes Team
Bronze medal	Uriel Canjura	El Salvador
Bronze medal	Luis Ramón Garrido	Mexico

The men's singles badminton event at the 2023 Pan American Games was held from October 21 to 25 at the Olympic Training Center, located in Ñuñoa, a suburb of Santiago. The defending Pan American Games champion is Ygor Coelho of Brazil.

Each National Olympic Committee could enter a maximum of three athletes into the competition. The athletes will be drawn into an elimination stage draw. Once an athlete lost a match, they will be no longer able to compete. Each match will be contested as the best of three games. A total of 31 athletes from 20 NOC's competed.

== Qualification ==
A total of 90 athletes (45 men and 45 women) qualified to compete at the games. A nation may enter a maximum of four athletes per gender (five if qualified through the 2021 Junior Pan American Games. As host nation, Chile automatically qualified a full team of eights athletes. All other quotas will be awarded through the team world rankings as of May 2, 2023. Each nation's highest ranked athlete/pair's points in each of the five events will be added to determine a country's point total.

== Seeds ==
The following athletes were seeded:

1. Brian Yang (CAN) (champion, gold medalist)
2. Ygor Coelho (BRA) (quarter-finals)
3. Kevin Cordón (EAI) (final, silver medalist)
4. Uriel Canjura (ESA) (semi-finals, bronze medalist)

== Results ==
=== Final ===
Final
1	Brian Yang (CAN)	21	21
3	Kevin Cordón (EAI)	18	6

=== Top half ===
First Round
Bradley Evans (JAM)	16	18
Sören Opti (SUR)	21	21
Juan Bencomo (CUB)	21	18	20
Frank Barrios (VEN)	6	21	22
Alonso Medel (CHI)	9	13
Jonathan Matias (BRA)	21	21
4	Uriel Canjura (ESA)	21	17	21
Job Castillo (MEX)	19	21	10
Ángel Mariñez (DOM)	16	15
Miguel Quirama (COL)	21	21
Santiago Otero (ARG)	10	12
Howard Shu (USA)	21	21
Henry Huebla (ECU)	21	21
Gianpiero Cavallotti (CRC)	12	17

Second Round
1	Brian Yang (CAN)	21	21
Sören Opti (SUR)	8	9
Frank Barrios (VEN)	10	8
Jonathan Matias (BRA)	21	21
4	Uriel Canjura (ESA)	21	21
Miguel Quirama (COL)	10	7
Howard Shu (USA)	23	21
Henry Huebla (ECU)	21	8

Quarter-finals
1	Brian Yang (CAN)	21	21
Jonathan Matias (BRA)	10	12
4	Uriel Canjura (ESA)	21	21
Howard Shu (USA)	12	3

Semi-finals
1	Brian Yang (CAN)	21	21
4	Uriel Canjura (ESA)	11	10

=== Bottom half ===
First Round
Adriano Viale (PER)	21	21
Reece Marcano (TTO)	9	8
Sebastian Vasquez (CHI)	13	18
Leo Lee (PAR)	21	21
Yonatan Linarez (DOM)	21	21
Manuel Mejía (ESA)	14	13
Justin Ma (USA)	13	12
3	Kevin Cordón (EAI)	21	21
Luis Ramón Garrido (MEX)	21	21
Samuel Ricketts (JAM)	13	16
Roberto Herrera (CUB)	21	21
Kennie King (BAR)	16	15
Javier Alas (ESA)	11	8
Nicolás Oliva (ARG)	21	21
Fernando Sanhueza (CHI)	10	9
2	Ygor Coelho (BRA)	21	21

Second Round
Adriano Viale (PER)	21	21
Leo Lee (PAR)	12	12
Yonatan Linarez (DOM)	11	11
3	Kevin Cordón (EAI)	21	21
Luis Ramón Garrido (MEX)	21	21
Roberto Herrera (CUB)	12	17
Nicolás Oliva (ARG)	17	15
2	Ygor Coelho (BRA)	21	21

Quarter-finals
Adriano Viale (PER)	15	9
3	Kevin Cordón (EAI)	21	21
Luis Ramón Garrido (MEX)	21	21
2	Ygor Coelho (BRA)	14	15

Semi-finals
3	Kevin Cordón (EAI)	21	21
Luis Ramón Garrido (MEX)	17	12
