= Badminton at the 2011 Pan American Games – Men's singles =

Badminton – Men's singles at the 2011 Pan American Games
- Venue: Multipurpose Gymnasium
- Dates: October 15 - October 20
- Competitors: 34 from 16 nations

Medalists
Gold medal	Kevin Cordón	Guatemala
Silver medal	Osleni Guerrero	Cuba
Bronze medal	Daniel Paiola	Brazil
Bronze medal	Charles Pyne	Jamaica

The men's singles badminton event at the 2011 Pan American Games was held October 15–20 at the Multipurpose Gymnasium in Guadalajara. The defending Pan American Games champion was Mike Beres of Canada, while the defending Pan American Championship champion was Stephan Wojcikiewicz, also of Canada. Beres retired after the 2008 Summer Olympics in Beijing, China.

The athletes were drawn into an elimination stage draw. Once a team lost a match it was no longer able to compete. Each match was contested as the best of three games.

The draw for the competition was done on October 7, 2011.

== Seeds ==
1. Kevin Cordón (GUA) (champion)
2. Rodrigo Pacheco (PER) (third round)
3. Stephan Wojcikiewicz (CAN) (quarterfinals)
4. Daniel Paiola (BRA) (semifinals)
5. Sattawat Pongnairat (USA) (third round)
6. Rodolfo Ramírez (GUA) (third round)
7. Lino Muñoz (MEX) (quarterfinals)
8. Alex Tjong (BRA) (quarterfinals)

== Results ==
=== Finals ===
Quarterfinals
1	Kevin Cordón (GUA)	21	21
Pedro Yang (GUA)	11	16
4	Daniel Paiola (BRA)	21	21
7	Lino Muñoz (MEX)	12	16
Osleni Guerrero (CUB)	10	22	21
3	Stephan Wojcikiewicz (CAN)	21	20	18
8	Alex Yuwan Tjong (BRA)	14	21	19
Charles Pyne (JAM)	21	19	21

Semifinals
1	Kevin Cordón (GUA)	21	21
4	Daniel Paiola (BRA)	14	8
Osleni Guerrero (CUB)	21	18	21
Charles Pyne (JAM)	18	21	18

Finals
1	Kevin Cordón (GUA)	23	21
Osleni Guerrero (CUB)	21	19

=== Top half ===
==== Section 1 ====
First round

Second round
1	K Cordón (GUA)	21	21
T Ng (CAN)	11	11
M Cuba (PER)	21	22
J Castillo (MEX)	18	20
5	S Pongnairat (USA)	21	21
B Valentín (PUR)	12	12
G Henry (JAM)	19	20
P Yang (GUA)	21	22

Third round
1	K Cordón (GUA)	21	23
M Cuba (PER)	15	21
5	S Pongnairat (USA)	14	21	16
P Yang (GUA)	21	13	21

Quarterfinals
1	K Cordón (GUA)	21	21
P Yang (GUA)	11	16

==== Section 2 ====
First round
A Padmore (BAR)	8	10
M Wongsodikromo (SUR)	21	21

Second round
4	D Paiola (BRA)	21	21
L Camacho (VEN)	14	9
A Raposo (DOM)	21	21
E Mujica (CHI)	13	14
7	L Muñoz (MEX)	21	21
M del Valle (PER)	10	3
R Toledo (CUB)	21	14	21
M Wongsodikromo (SUR)	18	21	13

Third round
4	D Paiola (BRA)	21	21
A Raposo (DOM)	7	8
7	L Muñoz (MEX)	21	21
T Ronald (CUB)	12	17

Quarterfinals
4	D Paiola (BRA)	21	21
7	L Muñoz (MEX)	12	16

=== Bottom half ===
==== Section 3 ====
First round
F Diaz (ARG)	5	15
O Guerrero (CUB)	21	21

Second round
O Guerrero (CUB)	21	21
V Soeroredjo (SUR)	11	16
A Trigo (CHI)	8	5
6	R Ramírez (GUA)	21	21
N Javier (DOM)	17	21	21
S Teran (ECU)	21	11	12
L dos Santos (BRA)	13	13
3	S Wojcikiewicz (CAN)	21	21

Third round
O Guerrero (CUB)	22	23
6	R Ramírez (GUA)	20	21
N Javier (DOM)	13	16
3	S Wojcikiewicz (CAN)	21	21

Quarterfinals
O Guerrero (CUB)	10	22	21
3	S Wojcikiewicz (CAN)	21	20	18

==== Section 4 ====
First round

Second round
C Araya (CHI)	21	21
D Darmohoetomo (SUR)	17	17
L Uzcategui (VEN)	6	8
8	A Tjong (BRA)	21	21
C Pyne (JAM)	21	21
K Matute (VEN)	9	9
A López (MEX)	12	20
2	R Pacheco (PER)	21	22

Third round
C Araya (CHI)	13	14
8	A Tjong (BRA)	21	21
C Pyne (JAM)	21	21	21
2	R Pacheco (PER)	22	17	10

Quarterfinals
8	A Tjong (BRA)	14	21	19
C Pyne (JAM)	21	19	21
