= Badminton at the 2016 Summer Olympics – Men's singles =

Men's singles at the Games of the XXXI Olympiad
- Venue: Riocentro - Pavilion 4
- Date: 11–20 August 2016
- Competitors: 41 from 37 nations

Medalists
1st place, gold medalist(s)		Chen Long	China
2nd place, silver medalist(s)		Lee Chong Wei	Malaysia
3rd place, bronze medalist(s)		Viktor Axelsen	Denmark

The badminton men's singles tournament at the 2016 Summer Olympics took place from 11 to 20 August at Riocentro - Pavilion 4. The seeding was decided on 21 July 2016.

China's Chen Long defeated Lee Chong Wei of Malaysia, 21–18, 21–18, to win the gold medal in men's singles badminton at the 2016 Summer Olympics. This was Lee's third consecutive Olympic silver medal. In the bronze-medal match, Denmark's Viktor Axelsen defeated the two-time defending Olympic champion Lin Dan of China, 15–21, 21–10, 21–17.

== Competition format ==
The tournament started with a group phase round-robin followed by a knockout stage.

== Seeds ==
A total of 13 players were given seeds.

1. Lee Chong Wei (MAS) (silver medalist)
2. Chen Long (CHN) (gold medalist)
3. Lin Dan (CHN) (fourth place)
4. Viktor Axelsen (DEN) (bronze medalist)
5. Jan Ø. Jørgensen (DEN) (round of 16)
6. Chou Tien-chen (TPE) (quarter-finals)
7. Tommy Sugiarto (INA) (round of 16)
8. Son Wan-ho (KOR) (quarter-finals)
9. Srikanth Kidambi (IND) (quarter-finals)
10. Hu Yun (HKG) (round of 16)
11. Ng Ka Long (HKG) (round of 16)
12. Marc Zwiebler (GER) (group stage)
13. Rajiv Ouseph (GBR) (quarter-finals)

== Group stage ==
=== Group A ===
Athlete	Pld	W	L	SW	SL	Pts
Lee Chong Wei (MAS)	2	2	0	4	0	2
Derek Wong Zi Liang (SIN)	2	1	1	2	2	1
Soren Opti (SUR)	2	0	2	0	4	0

Athlete 1	Score	Athlete 2
11 August, 09:35
Lee Chong Wei (MAS)	21–2; 21–3	Soren Opti (SUR)
12 August, 10:45
Derek Wong Zi Liang (SIN)	21–5; 21–6	Soren Opti (SUR)
14 August, 08:55
Lee Chong Wei (MAS)	21–18; 21–8	Derek Wong Zi Liang (SIN)

=== Group C ===
Athlete	Pld	W	L	SW	SL	Pts
Chou Tien-chen (TPE)	2	2	0	4	0	2
Misha Zilberman (ISR)	2	1	1	2	2	1
Yuhan Tan (BEL)	2	0	2	0	4	0

Athlete 1	Score	Athlete 2
12 August, 20:30
Chou Tien-chen (TPE)	21–9; 21–11	Misha Zilberman (ISR)
13 August, 17:25
Yuhan Tan (BEL)	20–22; 12–21	Misha Zilberman (ISR)
14 August, 10:05
Chou Tien-chen (TPE)	21–14; 21–8	Yuhan Tan (BEL)

=== Group D ===
Athlete	Pld	W	L	SW	SL	Pts
Hu Yun (HKG)	2	2	0	4	0	2
Pablo Abián (ESP)	2	1	1	2	2	1
Jaspar Yu Woon (BRU)	2	0	2	0	4	0

Athlete 1	Score	Athlete 2
12 August, 19:55
Hu Yun (HKG)	21–16; 21–15	Jaspar Yu Woon (BRU)
13 August, 20:30
Pablo Abián (ESP)	21–12; 21–10	Jaspar Yu Woon (BRU)
14 August, 15:30
Hu Yun (HKG)	21–18; 21–19	Pablo Abián (ESP)

=== Group E ===
Athlete	Pld	W	L	SW	SL	Pts
Lin Dan (CHN)	3	3	0	6	0	3
Nguyễn Tiến Minh (VIE)	3	2	1	4	3	2
Vladimir Malkov (RUS)	3	1	2	3	4	1
David Obernosterer (AUT)	3	0	3	0	6	0

Athlete 1	Score	Athlete 2
11 August, 08:25
Lin Dan (CHN)	21–5; 21–11	David Obernosterer (AUT)
11 August, 11:55
Nguyễn Tiến Minh (VIE)	15–21; 21–9; 21–13	Vladimir Malkov (RUS)
12 August, 09:00
Lin Dan (CHN)	21–18; 21–7	Vladimir Malkov (RUS)
12 August, 20:30
Nguyễn Tiến Minh (VIE)	21–18; 21–14	David Obernosterer (AUT)
14 August, 09:40
Lin Dan (CHN)	21–7; 21–12	Nguyễn Tiến Minh (VIE)
14 August, 10:40
Vladimir Malkov (RUS)	21–11; 21–10	David Obernosterer (AUT)

=== Group G ===
Athlete	Pld	W	L	SW	SL	Pts
Jan Ø. Jørgensen (DEN)	2	2	0	4	0	2
Brice Leverdez (FRA)	2	1	1	2	3	1
Raul Must (EST)	2	0	2	1	4	0

Athlete 1	Score	Athlete 2
12 August, 16:40
Jan Ø. Jørgensen (DEN)	21–8; 21–15	Raul Must (EST)
13 August, 20:30
Brice Leverdez (FRA)	21–18; 18–21; 21–12	Raul Must (EST)
14 August, 15:30
Jan Ø. Jørgensen (DEN)	21–11; 21–18	Brice Leverdez (FRA)

=== Group H ===
Athlete	Pld	W	L	SW	SL	Pts
Srikanth Kidambi (IND)	2	2	0	4	0	2
Henri Hurskainen (SWE)	2	1	1	2	2	1
Lino Muñoz (MEX)	2	0	2	0	4	0

Athlete 1	Score	Athlete 2
11 August, 21:05
Srikanth Kidambi (IND)	21–11; 21–17	Lino Muñoz (MEX)
13 August, 15:55
Henri Hurskainen (SWE)	21–12; 21–11	Lino Muñoz (MEX)
14 August, 10:40
Srikanth Kidambi (IND)	21–6; 21–18	Henri Hurskainen (SWE)

=== Group I ===
Athlete	Pld	W	L	SW	SL	Pts
Rajiv Ouseph (GBR)	2	2	0	4	0	2
Sho Sasaki (JPN)	2	1	1	2	3	1
Petr Koukal (CZE)	2	0	2	1	4	0

Athlete 1	Score	Athlete 2
11 August, 19:55
Rajiv Ouseph (GBR)	21–14; 21–18	Petr Koukal (CZE)
13 August, 10:10
Sho Sasaki (JPN)	21–10; 16–21; 21–12	Petr Koukal (CZE)
14 August, 10:05
Rajiv Ouseph (GBR)	21–15; 21–9	Sho Sasaki (JPN)

=== Group J ===
Athlete	Pld	W	L	SW	SL	Pts
Tommy Sugiarto (INA)	2	2	0	4	0	2
Osleni Guerrero (CUB)	2	1	1	2	2	1
Howard Shu (USA)	2	0	2	0	4	0

Athlete 1	Score	Athlete 2
12 August, 08:00
Tommy Sugiarto (INA)	21–14; 21–10	Howard Shu (USA)
13 August, 11:20
Osleni Guerrero (CUB)	21–16; 21–15	Howard Shu (USA)
14 August, 08:55
Tommy Sugiarto (INA)	21–12; 21–14	Osleni Guerrero (CUB)

=== Group K ===
Athlete	Pld	W	L	SW	SL	Pts
Scott Evans (IRL)	2	2	0	4	2	2
Marc Zwiebler (GER)	2	1	1	3	2	1
Ygor Coelho de Oliveira (BRA)	2	0	2	1	4	0

Athlete 1	Score	Athlete 2
12 August, 11:20
Marc Zwiebler (GER)	21–9; 17–21; 7–21	Scott Evans (IRL)
13 August, 19:55
Ygor Coelho de Oliveira (BRA)	8–21; 21–19; 8–21	Scott Evans (IRL)
14 August, 15:55
Marc Zwiebler (GER)	21–12; 21–12	Ygor Coelho de Oliveira (BRA)

=== Group L ===
Athlete	Pld	W	L	SW	SL	Pts
Viktor Axelsen (DEN)	2	2	0	4	0	2
Boonsak Ponsana (THA)	2	1	1	2	3	1
Lee Dong-keun (KOR)	2	0	2	1	4	0

Athlete 1	Score	Athlete 2
11 August, 11:20
Viktor Axelsen (DEN)	21–14; 21–13	Boonsak Ponsana (THA)
13 August, 09:35
Lee Dong-keun (KOR)	19–21; 21–17; 16–21	Boonsak Ponsana (THA)
14 August, 11:15
Viktor Axelsen (DEN)	21–11; 21–13	Lee Dong-keun (KOR)

=== Group M ===
Athlete	Pld	W	L	SW	SL	Pts
Ng Ka Long (HKG)	2	2	0	4	0	2
Martin Giuffre (CAN)	2	1	1	2	3	1
Pedro Martins (POR)	2	0	2	1	4	0

Athlete 1	Score	Athlete 2
11 August, 19:30
Ng Ka Long (HKG)	21–11; 21–14	Martin Giuffre (CAN)
13 August, 11:20
Pedro Martins (POR)	21–14; 22–24; 6–21	Martin Giuffre (CAN)
14 August, 09:40
Ng Ka Long (HKG)	21–17; 21–18	Pedro Martins (POR)

=== Group N ===
Athlete	Pld	W	L	SW	SL	Pts
Son Wan-ho (KOR)	2	2	0	4	0	2
Jacob Maliekal (RSA)	2	1	1	2	2	1
Artem Pochtarev (UKR)	2	0	2	0	4	0

Athlete 1	Score	Athlete 2
11 August, 19:30
Son Wan-ho (KOR)	21–10; 21–10	Jacob Maliekal (RSA)
12 August, 19:55
Artem Pochtarev (UKR)	18–21; 19–21	Jacob Maliekal (RSA)
14 August, 08:30
Son Wan-ho (KOR)	21–9; 21–15	Artem Pochtarev (UKR)

=== Group P ===
Athlete	Pld	W	L	SW	SL	Pts
Chen Long (CHN)	3	3	0	6	0	3
Niluka Karunaratne (SRI)	3	2	1	2	2	2
Adrian Dziółko (POL)	3	1	2	0	4	1
Kevin Cordón (GUA)	—N/a ^{1}					

Athlete 1	Score	Athlete 2
11 August, 10:10
Chen Long (CHN)	21–7; 21–10	Niluka Karunaratne (SRI)
11 August, 20:30
Kevin Cordón (GUA)	21–18; 10–21; 13–21^{1}	Adrian Dziółko (POL)
12 August, 19:30
Kevin Cordón (GUA)	w/o^{1}	Niluka Karunaratne (SRI)
13 August, 08:25
Chen Long (CHN)	21–12; 21–9	Adrian Dziółko (POL)
14 August, 10:40
Chen Long (CHN)	w/o^{1}	Kevin Cordón (GUA)
14 August, 15:55
Adrian Dziółko (POL)	19–21; 22–24	Niluka Karunaratne (SRI)

^{1} Cordòn was forced to retire from the competition due to an ankle injury he suffered during the third set of his match against Dziółko.

== Finals ==
Round of 16
Chou Tien-chen (TPE)	21	21
Hu Yun (HKG)	10	13
Jan Ø. Jørgensen (DEN)	19	19
Srikanth Kidambi (IND)	21	21
Rajiv Ouseph (GBR)	21	14	21
Tommy Sugiarto (INA)	13	21	16
Scott Evans (IRL)	16	12
Viktor Axelsen (DEN)	21	21
Ng Ka Long (HKG)	21	17
Son Wan-ho (KOR)	23	21

Quarter-finals
Lee Chong Wei (MAS)	21	21
Chou Tien-chen (TPE)	9	15
Lin Dan (CHN)	21	11	21
Srikanth Kidambi (IND)	6	21	18
Rajiv Ouseph (GBR)	12	16
Viktor Axelsen (DEN)	21	21
Son Wan-ho (KOR)	11	21	11
Chen Long (CHN)	21	18	21

Semi-finals
Lee Chong Wei (MAS)	15	21	22
Lin Dan (CHN)	21	11	20
Viktor Axelsen (DEN)	14	15
Chen Long (CHN)	21	21

Gold medal match
Lee Chong Wei (MAS)	18	18
Chen Long (CHN)	21	21
Bronze-medal match
Lin Dan (CHN)	21	10	17
Viktor Axelsen (DEN)	15	21	21
