= Badminton at the 2015 Pan American Games =

- Badminton pictogram for the games
- Venue: Atos Markham Pan Am Centre
- Dates: July 11–16
- No. of events: 5 (2 men, 2 women, 1 mixed)
- Competitors: 84 from 18 nations

Badminton competitions at the 2015 Pan American Games in Toronto were held from July 11 to 16 at the Markham Pan Am Centre (Atos Markham Pan Am Centre) in Markham. Due to naming rights the arena was known as the latter for the duration of the games. A total of five badminton events will be held: two each for men and women, along with a mixed doubles event.

== Venue ==
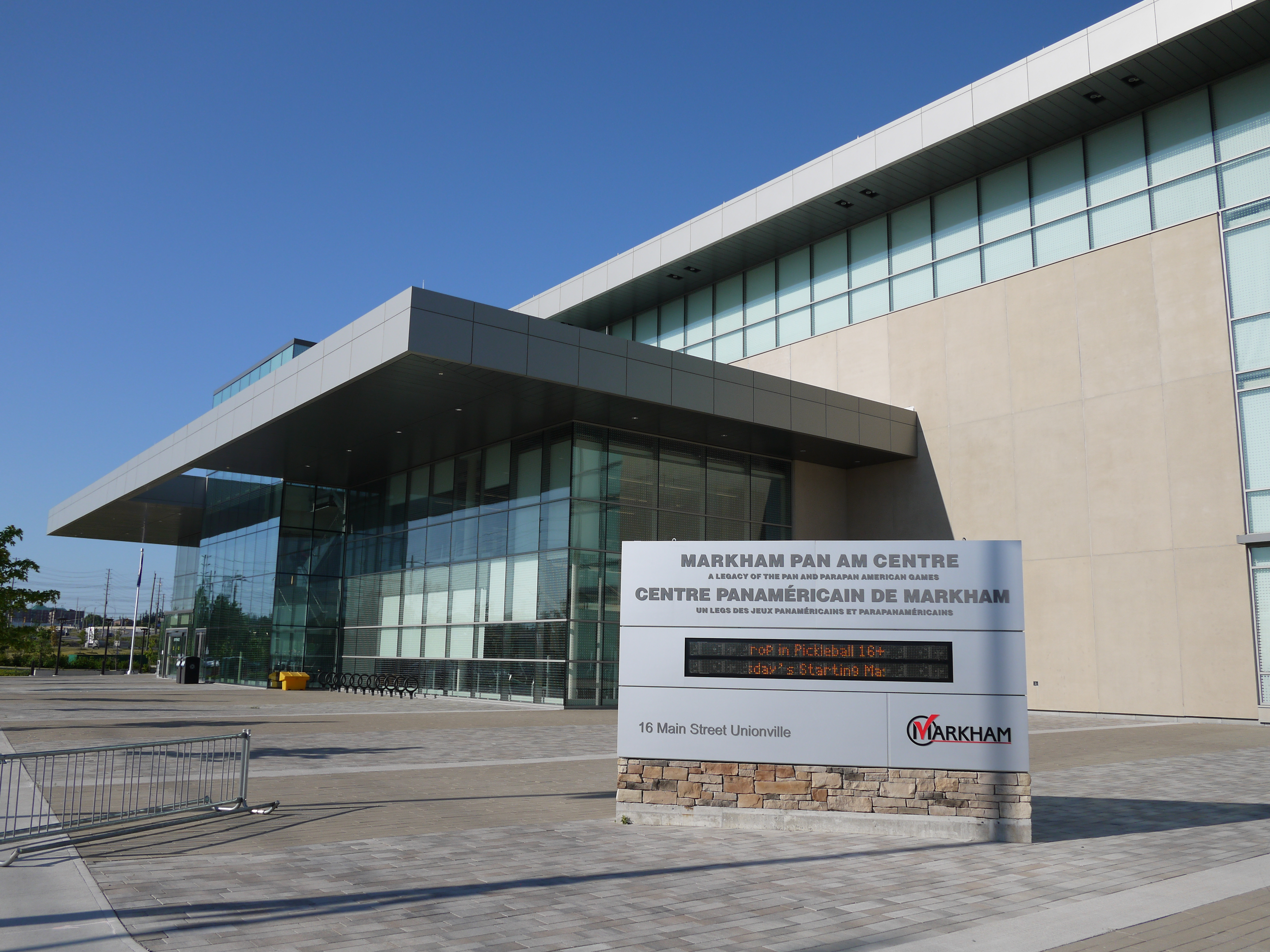
The Markham Pan Am Centre (Atos Markham Pan Am Centre), in Markham, was the venue for the badminton competitions.

The competitions took at the Atos Markham Pan Am Centre (Markham Pan Am Centre) located in the city of Markham, about 31 kilometers from the athletes village. The arena had a capacity of 2,000 people per session (1,000 permanent seating + 1,000 temporary seats). The venue also hosted table tennis competitions later during the games. The venue hosted the water polo competitions, but in the other side of the centre (an Olympic sized pool).

== Competition schedule ==
The following was the competition schedule for the badminton competitions:

P	Preliminaries	R64	Round of 64	R32	Round of 32	R16	Round of 16	¼	Quarterfinals	½	Semifinals	F	Final

Event↓/Date →	Sat 11		Sun 12	Mon 13	Tue 14	Wed 15	Thu 16
Men's singles	R64	R32	R16	¼	½		F
Men's doubles	R32		R16	¼	½	F	
Women's singles	R64	R32	R16	¼	½		F
Women's doubles	R32		R16	¼	½	F	
Mixed doubles	R32		R16	¼	½		F

== Medal table ==
* Host nation (Canada)

Rank	Nation	Gold	Silver	Bronze	Total
1	United States	3	0	3	6
2	Canada*	1	3	2	6
3	Guatemala	1	0	0	1
4	Brazil	0	2	1	3
5	Cuba	0	0	1	1
5	Dominican Republic	0	0	1	1
5	Mexico	0	0	1	1
5	Peru	0	0	1	1
Totals (8 entries)		5	5	10	20

== Medalists ==
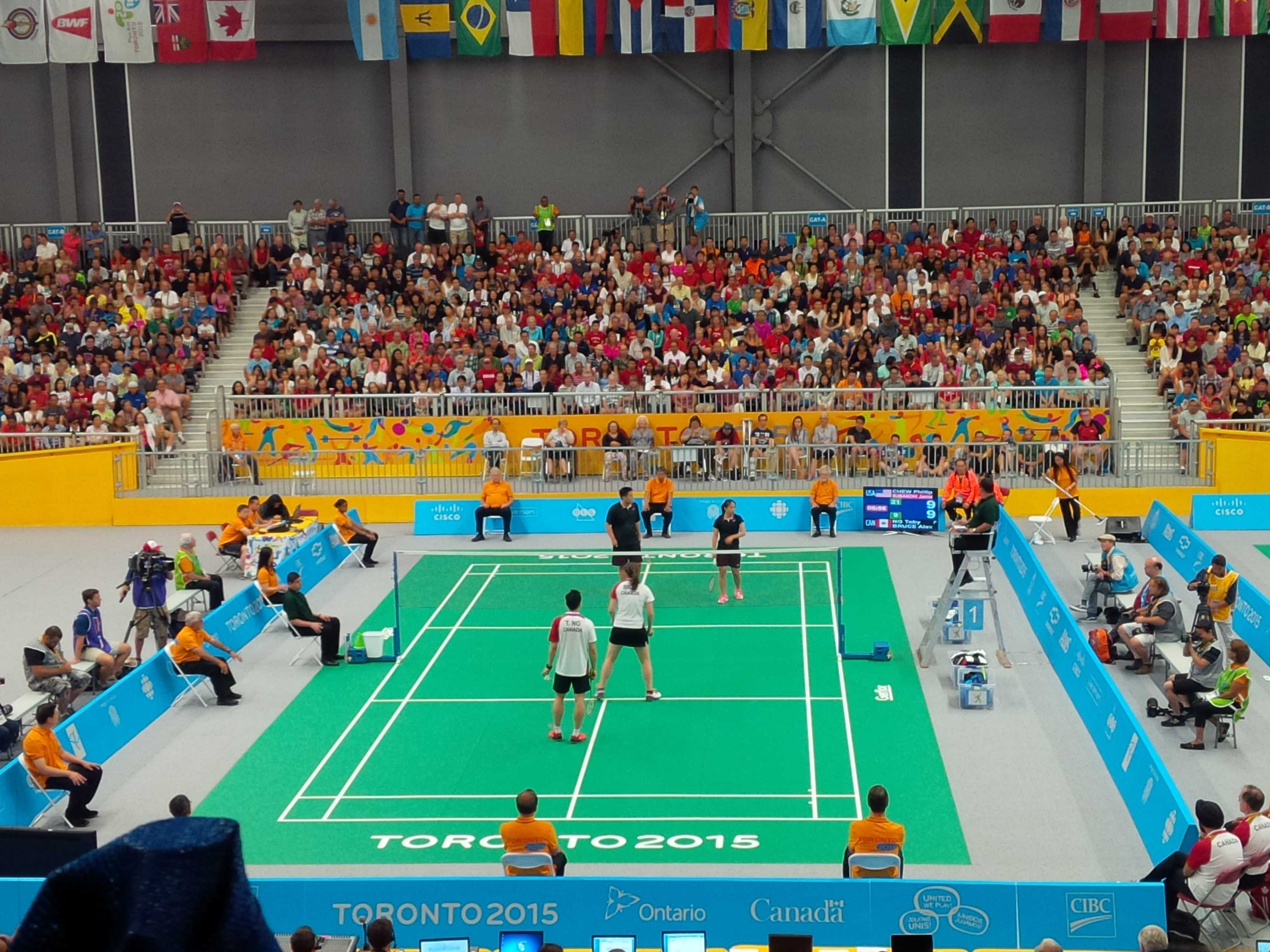
During the competition

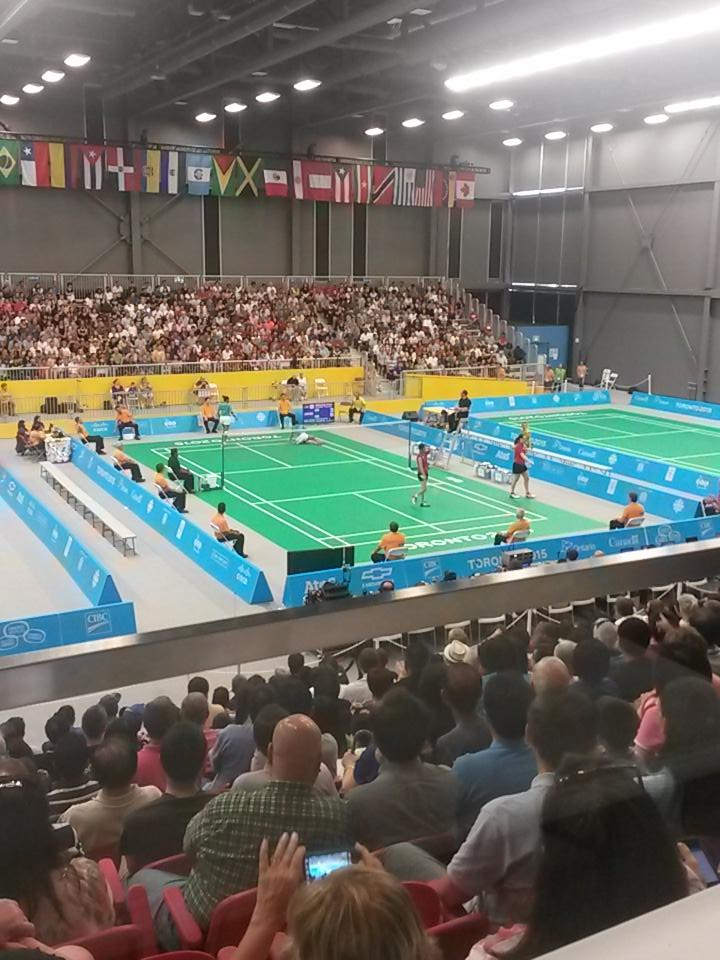
During the competition

Event	Gold	Silver	Bronze
Men's singles	Kevin Cordón; Guatemala	Andrew D'Souza; Canada	Osleni Guerrero; Cuba
Men's singles	Kevin Cordón; Guatemala	Andrew D'Souza; Canada	Howard Shu; United States
Women's singles	Michelle Li; Canada	Rachel Honderich; Canada	Iris Wang; United States
Women's singles	Michelle Li; Canada	Rachel Honderich; Canada	Jamie Subandhi; United States
Men's doubles	United States; Phillip Chew; Sattawat Pongnairat	Brazil; Hugo Arthuso; Daniel Paiola	Dominican Republic; Willian Cabrera; Nelson Javier
Men's doubles	United States; Phillip Chew; Sattawat Pongnairat	Brazil; Hugo Arthuso; Daniel Paiola	Mexico; Job Castillo; Lino Muñoz
Women's doubles	United States; Eva Lee; Paula Lynn Obañana	Brazil; Lohaynny Vicente; Luana Vicente	Canada; Rachel Honderich; Michelle Li
Women's doubles	United States; Eva Lee; Paula Lynn Obañana	Brazil; Lohaynny Vicente; Luana Vicente	Canada; Alex Bruce; Phyllis Chan
Mixed doubles	United States; Phillip Chew; Jamie Subandhi	Canada; Toby Ng; Alex Bruce	Brazil; Alex Yuwan Tjong; Lohaynny Vicente
Mixed doubles	United States; Phillip Chew; Jamie Subandhi	Canada; Toby Ng; Alex Bruce	Peru; Mario Cuba; Katherine Winder

== Participating nations ==
A total of 18 countries qualified athletes. The number of athletes a nation entered is in parentheses beside the name of the country. El Salvador and Guyana made their sport debuts at the Pan American Games.

- Argentina (6)
- Barbados (2)
- Brazil (8)
- Canada (6)
- Chile (4)
- Cuba (7)
- Dominican Republic (4)
- Ecuador (2)
- El Salvador (2)
- Guatemala (8)
- Guyana (2)
- Jamaica (4)
- Mexico (8)
- Peru (8)
- Suriname (2)
- Trinidad and Tobago (1)
- United States (8)
- Venezuela (2)

== Qualification ==
A maximum total of 88 athletes (44 men and 44 women) qualified to compete at the games. A nation may enter a maximum of four athletes per gender. As host nation, Canada automatically qualified a full team of eights athletes. All other athletes qualified through the team world rankings as of February 26, 2015.

== Controversy ==
Badminton Canada mistakenly entered three time defending Pan American Championships gold medalists Adrian Liu and Derrick Ng in overlapping events, which is a World Badminton Federation rule violation. Badminton Canada launched an appeal, however it was ultimately unsuccessful. Therefore, both athletes had to be withdrawn from the games.

== See also ==
- Badminton at the 2016 Summer Olympics
