= Badminton at the 2020 Summer Olympics – Men's singles =

Men's singles at the Games of the XXXII Olympiad
- Venue: Musashino Forest Sport Plaza
- Dates: 24 July – 2 August 2021
- Competitors: 42 from 36 nations

Medalists
1st place, gold medalist(s)		Viktor Axelsen	Denmark
2nd place, silver medalist(s)		Chen Long	China
3rd place, bronze medalist(s)		Anthony Sinisuka Ginting	Indonesia

The men's singles badminton tournament at the 2020 Summer Olympics took place from 24 July to 2 August 2021 at the Musashino Forest Sport Plaza at Tokyo. A total of 41 players from 36 nations competed at the tournament.

Denmark's Viktor Axelsen defeated the defending Olympic champion Chen Long from China 21–15, 21–12, to win the gold medal in men's singles badminton at the 2020 Summer Olympics. He became the first non-Asian to win the badminton men's singles event since compatriot Poul-Erik Høyer Larsen, who achieved the feat in 1996. Axelsen did not lose a game during the tournament, becoming the first player to achieve this feat since Lin Dan in 2008.

In the bronze-medal match, Indonesia's Anthony Sinisuka Ginting defeated Guatemala's Kevin Cordón 21–11, 21–13. Ginting became the first Olympic badminton medalist from Indonesia in men's singles since Sony Dwi Kuncoro in 2004. He also became the first Youth Olympic badminton medalist to win a medal at the Olympics, having also won bronze in 2014.

== Background ==
This was the 8th appearance of the event as a full medal event. Badminton was introduced as a demonstration sport in 1972, held again as an exhibition sport in 1988, and added to the full programme in 1992; the men's singles tournament had been held since.

The reigning champion was Chen Long of China, who also won bronze in 2012. 2016 bronze medalist Viktor Axelsen of Denmark also qualified. The top-ranked qualifier was Kento Momota of Japan who was also the reigning world champion.

== Qualification ==
The badminton qualification system was designed to ensure that 86 men and 86 women receive quota spots; the size of the men's singles field adjusts to hit that target quota. Following revisions due to the COVID-19 pandemic, the qualifying periods were set on 29 April 2019 to 15 March 2020 and 4 January to 13 June 2021, with the ranking list of 15 June 2021 deciding qualification.

There were 38 initial quota places for the men's singles: 34 from the ranking list, 3 from Tripartite Commission invitations, and 1 host nation place. Nations with multiple players in the top 16 of the ranking list could earn 2 quota places; all others were limited to 1. Players were taken from the ranking list in order, respecting the national limits, until the places were filled. Each continent was guaranteed one spot, either through the invitational spots or by replacing the lowest-ranked player if necessary. The host nation spot was unused since Japan qualified two players through the ranking list and was reallocated to the ranking list.

Additional places beyond 38 were added where players qualified in both the men's singles and one of the doubles events. This resulted in 3 additional places added to the ranking list. One place was also given to a member of the Refugee Team, Aram Mahmoud. The total of qualified players was thus 42.

== Competition format ==
The tournament started with a group phase round-robin followed by a knockout stage. For the group stage, the players were divided into between 12 and 16 groups of between 3 and 4 players each. Each group played a round-robin. The top player in each group advanced to the knockout rounds. The knockout stage was a four-round single elimination tournament with a bronze medal match. If there were fewer than 16 groups in the group stage, some players received a bye in the round of 16.

Matches were played best-of-three games. Each game was played to 21, except that a player must win by 2 unless the score reaches 30–29.

== Schedule ==
The tournament was held over a 10-day period, with 9 competition days and 1 open day.

Legend

P	Preliminaries	R	Round of 16	QF	Quarter-finals	SF	Semi-finals	M	Medal matches

Date	24 Jul		25 Jul		26 Jul		27 Jul		28 Jul		29 Jul		30 Jul		31 Jul		1 Aug		2 Aug	
Event	M	E	M	E	M	E	M	E	M	E	M	E	M	A	M	E	A	E	A	E
Men's singles	P									P		R			QF		SF			M

== Seeds ==
A total of 14 players were given seeds.

1. Kento Momota (JPN) (group stage)
2. Chou Tien-chen (TPE) (quarter-finals)
3. Anders Antonsen (DEN) (quarter-finals)
4. Viktor Axelsen (DEN) (gold medalist)
5. Anthony Sinisuka Ginting (INA) (bronze medalist)
6. Chen Long (CHN) (silver medalist)
7. Jonatan Christie (INA) (round of 16)
8. Ng Ka Long (HKG) (group stage)
9. Lee Zii Jia (MAS) (round of 16)
10. Wang Tzu-wei (TPE) (round of 16)
11. Shi Yuqi (CHN) (quarter-finals)
12. Kanta Tsuneyama (JPN) (round of 16)
13. B. Sai Praneeth (IND) (group stage)
14. Kantaphon Wangcharoen (THA) (group stage)

== Group stage ==
The group stage was played from 24 to 28 July. The winner of each group advanced to the knockout rounds.

=== Group A ===
Pos	Team	Pld	W	L	GF	GA	GD	PF	PA	PD	Pts	Qualification
1	Heo Kwang-hee (KOR)	2	2	0	4	0	+4	84	59	+25	2	Advance to quarter-finals
2	Kento Momota (JPN) (H)	2	1	1	2	2	0	76	63	+13	1	
3	Timothy Lam (USA)	2	0	2	0	4	−4	46	84	−38	0	

Source: TOCOG
(H) Host

Date	Time	Player 1	Score	Player 2	Set 1	Set 2	Set 3
25 July	18:00	Kento Momota (Japan)	2–0 (Note: Archived 25 July 2021 at the Wayback Machine)	(United States) Timothy Lam	21–12	21–9	
26 July	18:40	Heo Kwang-hee (South Korea)	2–0 (Note: Archived 26 July 2021 at the Wayback Machine)	(United States) Timothy Lam	21–10	21–15	
28 July	20:00	Kento Momota (Japan)	0–2 (Note: Archived 28 July 2021 at the Wayback Machine)	(South Korea) Heo Kwang-hee	15–21	19–21	

=== Group C ===
Pos	Team	Pld	W	L	GF	GA	GD	PF	PA	PD	Pts	Qualification
1	Kevin Cordón (GUA)	2	2	0	4	0	+4	85	59	+26	2	Advance to elimination round
2	Ng Ka Long (HKG)	2	1	1	2	2	0	75	62	+13	1	
3	Lino Muñoz (MEX)	2	0	2	0	4	−4	45	84	−39	0	

Source: TOCOG

Date	Time	Player 1	Score	Player 2	Set 1	Set 2	Set 3
24 July	10:20	Ng Ka Long (Hong Kong)	2–0 (Note: Archived 29 July 2021 at the Wayback Machine)	(Mexico) Lino Muñoz	21–9	21–10	
26 July	14:00	Kevin Cordón (Guatemala)	2–0 (Note: Archived 26 July 2021 at the Wayback Machine)	(Mexico) Lino Muñoz	21–14	21–12	
28 July	18:00	Ng Ka Long (Hong Kong)	0–2 (Note: Archived 27 July 2021 at the Wayback Machine)	(Guatemala) Kevin Cordón	20–22	13–21	

=== Group D ===
Pos	Team	Pld	W	L	GF	GA	GD	PF	PA	PD	Pts	Qualification
1	Mark Caljouw (NED)	2	2	0	4	1	+3	101	68	+33	2	Advance to elimination round
2	Misha Zilberman (ISR)	2	1	1	3	2	+1	82	91	−9	1	
3	B. Sai Praneeth (IND)	2	0	2	0	4	−4	60	84	−24	0	

Source: TOCOG

Date	Time	Player 1	Score	Player 2	Set 1	Set 2	Set 3
24 July	13:00	B. Sai Praneeth (India)	0–2 (Note: Archived 25 July 2021 at the Wayback Machine)	(Israel) Misha Zilberman	17–21	15-21	
26 July	11:20	Mark Caljouw (Netherlands)	2–1 (Note: Archived 26 July 2021 at the Wayback Machine)	(Israel) Misha Zilberman	17–21	21–9	21–10
28 July	18:00	B. Sai Praneeth (India)	0–2 (Note: Archived 27 July 2021 at the Wayback Machine)	(Netherlands) Mark Caljouw	14–21	14–21	

=== Group E ===
Pos	Team	Pld	W	L	GF	GA	GD	PF	PA	PD	Pts	Qualification
1	Viktor Axelsen (DEN)	2	2	0	4	0	+4	84	45	+39	2	Advance to elimination round
2	Kalle Koljonen (FIN)	2	1	1	2	2	0	64	72	−8	1	
3	Luka Wraber (AUT)	2	0	2	0	4	−4	53	84	−31	0	

Source: TOCOG

Date	Time	Player 1	Score	Player 2	Set 1	Set 2	Set 3
24 July	19:20	Viktor Axelsen (Denmark)	2–0 (Note: Archived 25 July 2021 at the Wayback Machine)	(Austria) Luka Wraber	21–12	21–11	
26 July	10:40	Kalle Koljonen (Finland)	2–0 (Note: Archived 26 July 2021 at the Wayback Machine)	(Austria) Luka Wraber	21–13	21–17	
28 July	18:40	Viktor Axelsen (Denmark)	2–0 (Note: Archived 27 July 2021 at the Wayback Machine)	(Finland) Kalle Koljonen	21–9	21–13	

=== Group F ===
Pos	Team	Pld	W	L	GF	GA	GD	PF	PA	PD	Pts	Qualification
1	Wang Tzu-wei (TPE)	2	2	0	4	1	+3	102	72	+30	2	Advance to elimination round
2	Nhat Nguyen (IRL)	2	1	1	3	2	+1	87	90	−3	1	
3	Niluka Karunaratne (SRI)	2	0	2	0	4	−4	57	84	−27	0	

Source: TOCOG

Date	Time	Player 1	Score	Player 2	Set 1	Set 2	Set 3
24 July	20:00	Wang Tzu-wei (Chinese Taipei)	2–0 (Note: Archived 26 July 2021 at the Wayback Machine)	(Sri Lanka) Niluka Karunaratne	21–12	21–15	
26 July	20:00	Nhat Nguyen (Republic of Ireland)	2–0 (Note: Archived 26 July 2021 at the Wayback Machine)	(Sri Lanka) Niluka Karunaratne	21–16	21–14	
28 July	18:40	Wang Tzu-wei (Chinese Taipei)	2–1 (Note: Archived 28 July 2021 at the Wayback Machine)	(Republic of Ireland) Nhat Nguyen	21–12	18–21	21–12

=== Group G ===
Pos	Team	Pld	W	L	GF	GA	GD	PF	PA	PD	Pts	Qualification
1	Jonatan Christie (INA)	2	2	0	4	1	+3	98	81	+17	2	Advance to elimination round
2	Loh Kean Yew (SGP)	2	1	1	3	2	+1	101	83	+18	1	
3	Aram Mahmoud (EOR)	2	0	2	0	4	−4	49	84	−35	0	

Source: TOCOG

Date	Time	Player 1	Score	Player 2	Set 1	Set 2	Set 3
24 July	11:00	Jonatan Christie (Indonesia)	2–0 (Note: Archived 26 July 2021 at the Wayback Machine)	Aram Mahmoud	21–8	21–14	
26 July	20:00	Loh Kean Yew (Singapore)	2–0 (Note: Archived 28 July 2021 at the Wayback Machine)	Aram Mahmoud	21–15	21–12	
28 July	19:20	Jonatan Christie (Indonesia)	2–1 (Note: Archived 28 July 2021 at the Wayback Machine)	(Singapore) Loh Kean Yew	22–20	13–21	21–18

=== Group H ===
Pos	Team	Pld	W	L	GF	GA	GD	PF	PA	PD	Pts	Qualification
1	Shi Yuqi (CHN)	1	1	0	2	0	+2	42	17	+25	1	Advance to elimination round
2	Matthew Abela (MLT)	1	0	1	0	2	−2	17	42	−25	0	
3	Sören Opti (SUR) (N)	0	0	0	0	0	0	0	0	0	0	

Source: TOCOG
(N) Did not start

Date	Time	Player 1	Score	Player 2	Set 1	Set 2	Set 3
25 July	12:40	Shi Yuqi (China)	2–0 (Note: Archived 26 July 2021 at the Wayback Machine)	(Malta) Matthew Abela	21–8	21–9	
26 July	19:20	Sören Opti (Suriname)	N/P (Note: Archived 27 July 2021 at the Wayback Machine)	(Malta) Matthew Abela	Cancelled		
28 July	19:20	Shi Yuqi (China)	N/P (Note: Archived 27 July 2021 at the Wayback Machine)	(Suriname) Sören Opti	Cancelled		

=== Group I ===
Pos	Team	Pld	W	L	GF	GA	GD	PF	PA	PD	Pts	Qualification
1	Kanta Tsuneyama (JPN) (H)	2	2	0	4	0	+4	84	36	+48	2	Advance to elimination round
2	Ygor Coelho (BRA)	2	1	1	2	2	0	64	63	+1	1	
3	Julien Paul (MRI)	2	0	2	0	4	−4	35	84	−49	0	

Source: TOCOG
(H) Host

Date	Time	Player 1	Score	Player 2	Set 1	Set 2	Set 3
25 July	10:40	Kanta Tsuneyama (Japan)	2–0 (Note: Archived 25 July 2021 at the Wayback Machine)	(Mauritius) Julien Paul	21–8	21–6	
26 July	14:00	Ygor Coelho (Brazil)	2–0 (Note: Archived 26 July 2021 at the Wayback Machine)	(Mauritius) Julien Paul	21–5	21–16	
28 July	19:20	Kanta Tsuneyama (Japan)	2–0 (Note: Archived 27 July 2021 at the Wayback Machine)	(Brazil) Ygor Coelho	21–14	21–8	

=== Group J ===
Pos	Team	Pld	W	L	GF	GA	GD	PF	PA	PD	Pts	Qualification
1	Anthony Sinisuka Ginting (INA)	2	2	0	4	0	+4	84	43	+41	2	Advance to elimination round
2	Sergey Sirant (ROC)	2	1	1	2	2	0	64	78	−14	1	
3	Gergely Krausz (HUN)	2	0	2	0	4	−4	57	84	−27	0	

Source: TOCOG

Date	Time	Player 1	Score	Player 2	Set 1	Set 2	Set 3
25 July	13:20	Anthony Sinisuka Ginting (Indonesia)	2–0 (Note: Archived 25 July 2021 at the Wayback Machine)	(Hungary) Gergely Krausz	21–13	21–8	
27 July	10:00	Sergey Sirant (Russia)	2–0 (Note: Archived 26 July 2021 at the Wayback Machine)	(Hungary) Gergely Krausz	21–18	21–18	
28 July	18:00	Anthony Sinisuka Ginting (Indonesia)	2–0 (Note: Archived 28 July 2021 at the Wayback Machine)	(Russia) Sergey Sirant	21–12	21–10	

=== Group K ===
Pos	Team	Pld	W	L	GF	GA	GD	PF	PA	PD	Pts	Qualification
1	Toby Penty (GBR)	2	2	0	4	0	+4	84	60	+24	2	Advance to elimination round
2	Kantaphon Wangcharoen (THA)	2	1	1	2	2	0	73	70	+3	1	
3	Kai Schäfer (GER)	2	0	2	0	4	−4	57	84	−27	0	

Source: TOCOG

Date	Time	Player 1	Score	Player 2	Set 1	Set 2	Set 3
25 July	20:00	Kantaphon Wangcharoen (Thailand)	2–0 (Note: Archived 25 July 2021 at the Wayback Machine)	(Germany) Kai Schäfer	21–13	21–15	
27 July	10:40	Toby Penty (United Kingdom)	2–0 (Note: Archived 25 July 2021 at the Wayback Machine)	(Germany) Kai Schäfer	21–18	21–11	
28 July	20:00	Kantaphon Wangcharoen (Thailand)	0–2 (Note: Archived 27 July 2021 at the Wayback Machine)	(United Kingdom) Toby Penty	19–21	12–21	

=== Group L ===
Pos	Team	Pld	W	L	GF	GA	GD	PF	PA	PD	Pts	Qualification
1	Anders Antonsen (DEN)	2	2	0	4	0	+4	84	57	+27	2	Advance to elimination round
2	Ade Resky Dwicahyo (AZE)	2	1	1	2	2	0	73	74	−1	1	
3	Nguyễn Tiến Minh (VIE)	2	0	2	0	4	−4	58	84	−26	0	

Source: TOCOG

Date	Time	Player 1	Score	Player 2	Set 1	Set 2	Set 3
25 July	20:00	Anders Antonsen (Denmark)	2–0 (Note: Archived 28 July 2021 at the Wayback Machine)	(Vietnam) Nguyễn Tiến Minh	21–13	21–13	
27 July	20:00	Ade Resky Dwicahyo (Azerbaijan)	2–0 (Note: Archived 25 July 2021 at the Wayback Machine)	(Vietnam) Nguyễn Tiến Minh	21–14	21–18	
28 July	20:00	Anders Antonsen (Denmark)	2–0 (Note: Archived 27 July 2021 at the Wayback Machine)	(Azerbaijan) Ade Resky Dwicahyo	21–16	21–15	

=== Group M ===
Pos	Team	Pld	W	L	GF	GA	GD	PF	PA	PD	Pts	Qualification
1	Lee Zii Jia (MAS)	2	2	0	4	0	+4	84	38	+46	2	Advance to elimination round
2	Brice Leverdez (FRA)	2	1	1	2	2	0	64	60	+4	1	
3	Artem Pochtarov (UKR)	2	0	2	0	4	−4	34	84	−50	0	

Source: TOCOG

Date	Time	Player 1	Score	Player 2	Set 1	Set 2	Set 3
25 July	18:40	Lee Zii Jia (Malaysia)	2–0 (Note: Archived 26 July 2021 at the Wayback Machine)	(Ukraine) Artem Pochtarov	21–5	21–11	
27 July	13:20	Brice Leverdez (France)	2–0 (Note: Archived 27 July 2021 at the Wayback Machine)	(Ukraine) Artem Pochtarov	21–10	21–8	
28 July	20:40	Lee Zii Jia (Malaysia)	2–0 (Note: Archived 27 July 2021 at the Wayback Machine)	(France) Brice Leverdez	21–17	21–5	

=== Group N ===
Pos	Team	Pld	W	L	GF	GA	GD	PF	PA	PD	Pts	Qualification
1	Chen Long (CHN)	2	2	0	4	0	+4	84	40	+44	2	Advance to elimination round
2	Pablo Abián (ESP)	2	1	1	2	2	0	63	60	+3	1	
3	Raul Must (EST)	2	0	2	0	4	−4	37	84	−47	0	

Source: TOCOG

Date	Time	Player 1	Score	Player 2	Set 1	Set 2	Set 3
25 July	14:00	Chen Long (China)	2–0 (Note: Archived 26 July 2021 at the Wayback Machine)	(Estonia) Raul Must	21–10	21–9	
27 July	10:00	Pablo Abián (Spain)	2–0 (Note: Archived 25 July 2021 at the Wayback Machine)	(Estonia) Raul Must	21–7	21–11	
28 July	20:40	Chen Long (China)	2–0 (Note: Archived 27 July 2021 at the Wayback Machine)	(Spain) Pablo Abián	21–11	21–10	

=== Group P ===
Pos	Team	Pld	W	L	GF	GA	GD	PF	PA	PD	Pts	Qualification
1	Chou Tien-chen (TPE)	2	2	0	4	1	+3	101	82	+19	2	Advance to quarter-finals
2	Felix Burestedt (SWE)	2	1	1	2	2	0	65	71	−6	1	
3	Brian Yang (CAN)	2	0	2	1	4	−3	88	101	−13	0	

Source: TOCOG

Date	Time	Player 1	Score	Player 2	Set 1	Set 2	Set 3
25 July	10:00	Chou Tien-chen (Chinese Taipei)	2–0 (Note: Archived 25 July 2021 at the Wayback Machine)	(Sweden) Felix Burestedt	21–12	21–11	
27 July	19:20	Brian Yang (Canada)	0–2 (Note: Archived 25 July 2021 at the Wayback Machine)	(Sweden) Felix Burestedt	12–21	17–21	
28 July	18:40	Chou Tien-chen (Chinese Taipei)	2–1 (Note: Archived 28 July 2021 at the Wayback Machine)	(Canada) Brian Yang	21–18	16–21	22–20

== Finals ==
The knockout stage was played from 29 July to 2 August. One round was held per day, with a day off on 30 July. This stage was a single-elimination tournament with a bronze medal match.

Round of 16
C1	Kevin Cordón (GUA)	21	3	21
D1	Mark Caljouw (NED)	17	21	19
E1	Viktor Axelsen (DEN)	21	21
F1	Wang Tzu-wei (TPE)	16	14
G1	Jonatan Christie (INA)	11	9
H1	Shi Yuqi (CHN)	21	21
I1	Kanta Tsuneyama (JPN)	18	14
J1	Anthony Sinisuka Ginting (INA)	21	21
K1	Toby Penty (GBR)	10	15
L1	Anders Antonsen (DEN)	21	21
M1	Lee Zii Jia (MAS)	21	19	5
N1	Chen Long (CHN)	8	21	21

Quarter-finals
A1	Heo Kwang-hee (KOR)	13	18
C1	Kevin Cordón (GUA)	21	21
E1	Viktor Axelsen (DEN)	21	21
H1	Shi Yuqi (CHN)	13	13
J1	Anthony Sinisuka Ginting (INA)	21	15	21
L1	Anders Antonsen (DEN)	18	21	18
N1	Chen Long (CHN)	21	9	21
P1	Chou Tien-chen (TPE)	14	21	14

Semi-finals
C1	Kevin Cordón (GUA)	18	11
E1	Viktor Axelsen (DEN)	21	21
J1	Anthony Sinisuka Ginting (INA)	16	11
N1	Chen Long (CHN)	21	21

Gold medal match
E1	Viktor Axelsen (DEN)	21	21
N1	Chen Long (CHN)	15	12
Bronze medal match
C1	Kevin Cordón (GUA)	11	13
J1	Anthony Sinisuka Ginting (INA)	21	21
