= Badminton at the 2015 Pan American Games – Men's singles =

Badminton – Men's singles at the 2015 Pan American Games
- Venue: Atos Markham Pan Am Centre
- Dates: July 11 – July 16
- Competitors: 35 from 19 nations

Medalists
Gold medal	Kevin Cordón	Guatemala
Silver medal	Andrew D'Souza	Canada
Bronze medal	Howard Shu	United States
Bronze medal	Osleni Guerrero	Cuba

The men's singles badminton event at the 2015 Pan American Games will be held from July 11–16 at the Atos Markham Pan Am Centre in Toronto. The defending Pan American Games champion is Kevin Cordón of Guatemala.

The athletes will be drawn into an elimination stage draw. Once a team lost a match, it will be not longer able to compete. Each match will be contested as the best of three games.

== Schedule ==
All times are Central Standard Time (UTC-6).

Date	Time	Round
July 11, 2015	9:00	First Round
July 11, 2015	9:35	Second Round
July 12, 2015	13:40	Third Round
July 13, 2015	11:00	Quarterfinals
July 14, 2015	12:00	Semifinals
July 16, 2015	15:30	Final

== Seeds ==
1. Osleni Guerrero (CUB) (semifinals)
2. Howard Shu (USA) (semifinals)
3. Kevin Cordón (GUA) (champion)
4. Sattawat Pongnairat (USA) (quarterfinals)
5. Daniel Paiola (BRA) (quarterfinals)
6. Bjorn Seguin (USA) (third round)
7. Alex Tjong (BRA) (second round)
8. Ygor Coelho de Oliveira (BRA) (quarterfinals)

== Results ==
=== Finals ===
Semifinals
1	Osleni Guerrero (CUB)	21	14	13
Andrew D'Souza (CAN)	13	21	21
3	Kevin Cordón (GUA)	16	21	21
2	Howard Shu (USA)	21	14	18

Final
Andrew D'Souza (CAN)	13	14
3	Kevin Cordón (GUA)	21	21

=== Top half ===
==== Section 1 ====
First Round

Second Round
1	O Guerrero (CUB)	21	21
I Leon (CHI)	2	9
N Ramdhani (GUY)	14	18
N Javier (DOM)	21	21
6	B Seguin (USA)	21	21
D Darmohoetomo (SUR)	7	9
L Muñoz (MEX)	21	21
G Jassiel (ESA)	5	6

Third Round
1	O Guerrero (CUB)	21	21
N Javier (DOM)	9	15
6	B Seguin (USA)	18	9
L Muñoz (MEX)	21	21

Quarterfinals
1	O Guerrero (CUB)	21	21
L Muñoz (MEX)	8	15

==== Section 2 ====
First Round
A D'Souza (CAN)	21	21
P Macagno (ARG)	9	9

Second Round
4	S Pongnairat (USA)	21	21
N Bonkowsky (TTO)	8	11
H Humblers (GUA)	21	21
D Thorpe (BAR)	5	7
7	A Tjong (BRA)	14	13
M Cuba (PER)	21	21
G Henry (JAM)	21	16	11
A D'Souza (CAN)	16	21	21

Third Round
4	S Pongnairat (USA)	21	11	21
H Humblers (GUA)	13	21	8
M Cuba (PER)	8	9
A D'Souza (CAN)	21	21

Quarterfinals
4	S Pongnairat (USA)	14	10
A D'Souza (CAN)	21	21

=== Bottom half ===
==== Section 3 ====
First Round
A Corpancho (PER)	18	18
J Castillo (MEX)	21	21

Second Round
J Castillo (MEX)	21	21
J Lama (VEN)	10	7
F Diaz (ARG)	21	8	12
8	YC de Oliveira (BRA)	19	21	21
J Guevara (PER)	12	10
L Garrido (MEX)	21	21
D Reid (JAM)	12	14
3	K Cordón (GUA)	21	21

Third Round
J Castillo (MEX)	14	17
8	YC de Oliveira (BRA)	21	21
L Garrido (MEX)	13	13
3	K Cordón (GUA)	21	21

Quarterfinals
8	YC de Oliveira (BRA)	18	15
3	K Cordón (GUA)	21	21

==== Section 4 ====
First Round
R Ramirez (GUA)	21	21
C Araya (CHI)	9	8

Second Round
R Ramirez (GUA)	21	21
T Thouyaret (ARG)	14	6
L Martinez (CUB)	16	17
5	D Paiola (BRA)	21	21
W Cabrera (DOM)	21	21
E Zambrano (ECU)	17	10
B Veliz Arbolay (CUB)	12	13
2	H Shu (USA)	21	21

Third Round
R Ramirez (GUA)	11	17
5	D Paiola (BRA)	21	21
W Cabrera (DOM)	9	14
2	H Shu (USA)	21	21

Quarterfinals
5	D Paiola (BRA)	21	16	18
2	H Shu (USA)	12	21	21
