= Andrew D'Souza =

Canadian badminton player (born 1994)

Personal information
- Born: Andrew William D'Souza; 1 July 1994 (age 32) Ottawa, Ontario, Canada
- Height: 1.78 m (5 ft 10 in)
- Weight: 71 kg (157 lb)

Sport
- Country: Canada
- Sport: Badminton
- Handedness: Right

Men's singles & doubles
- Highest ranking: 161 (MS) 23 September 2015; 106 (MD) 14 November 2013
- BWF profile
Medal record
Badminton
Representing Canada
Pan American Games
Silver medal – second place	2015 Toronto	Men's singles
Pan Am Championships
Gold medal – first place	2014 Markham	Mixed team
Gold medal – first place	2013 Santo Domingo	Mixed team

Andrew William D'Souza (born 1 July 1994) is a Canadian male badminton player from Ottawa, Ontario. He has been a top ranked men's individual on the continent and a contender in major international competitions such as the 2012 BWF World Junior Championships, the 2014 Commonwealth Games and 2015 Pan American Games. He has won the men's singles title at the Canadian National Badminton Championships in 2015. In 2011, he trained at the Gopichand Badminton Academy in India.

== Achievements ==
=== Pan American Games ===
Men's Singles
Year	Venue	Opponent	Score	Result
2015	Atos Markham Pan Am Centre, Toronto, Ontario, Canada	(Guatemala) Kevin Cordón	13–21, 14–21	Silver

=== BWF International Challenge/Series ===
Men's Doubles
Year	Tournament	Partner	Opponent	Score	Result
2013	USA International	(Canada) Sergiy Shatenko	(United States) Christian Yahya Christianto (United States) Hock Lai Lee	9–21, 14–21	(silver) Runner-up

BWF International Challenge tournament
BWF International Series tournament
