= Badminton at the 2007 Pan American Games – Men's singles =

The men's singles at the 2007 Pan American Games was played at the Riocentro Sports Complex, Pavilion 4B. The competition was held between July 14 and 19.

== Medals ==
Gold	Mike Beres; Canada
Silver	Kevin Cordón; Guatemala
Bronze	Rodrigo Pacheco; Peru
Bronze	Eric Go; United States

== Draw ==
=== Finals ===
Semifinals					Final
	Mike Beres (CAN)	17	21	21
3	Rodrigo Pacheco (PER)	21	13	19		Mike Beres (CAN)	13	21	21
4	Kevin Cordón (GUA)	18	21	21	4	Kevin Cordón (GUA)	21	11	10
2	Eric Go (USA)	21	13	16

=== Top half ===
First Round
1	P Yang (GUA)	21	21
T Thouyaret (ARG)	9	8
K Wood (BAR)	8	8
K Pantin (TRI)	21	21
5	P von Scala (BRA)	13	19
M Beres (CAN)	21	21
J Martin (JAM)	11	6
JL Gonzalez (MEX)	21	21
3	R Pacheco (PER)	21	21
M Wongsodikromo (SUR)	14	11
A Hernandez (CUB)	21	21
E Mujica (CHI)	19	13
6	N Jinadasa (USA)	21	21
S Zambrano (ECU)	4	5
G Thomas (TRI)	10	9
D Snider (CAN)	21	21

Second Round
1	P Yang (GUA)	21	21
K Pantin (TRI)	7	10
M Beres (CAN)	23	19	21
JL Gonzalez (MEX)	21	21	15
3	R Pacheco (PER)	21	17	21
A Hernandez (CUB)	11	21	19
6	N Jinadasa (USA)	14	16
D Snider (CAN)	21	21

Quarterfinals
1	P Yang (GUA)	21	8	14
M Beres (CAN)	17	21	21
3	R Pacheco (PER)	21	21
D Snider (CAN)	17	11

Semifinals
M Beres (CAN)	17	21	21
3	R Pacheco (PER)	21	13	19

=== Bottom half ===
First Round
L Araujo (BRA)	21	17	21
J Jimeno (PER)	16	21	13
J Rogers (CAN)	15	4
7	E Anguiano (GUA)	21	21
S Sánchez (MEX)	21	21
A Seepaul (TRI)	17	12
J Aguilar (MEX)	21	16	10
4	K Cordón (GUA)	17	21	21
S Bugallo (ARG)	16	20
E Mendez (JAM)	21	22
O Guerrero (CUB)	21	21
8	A Corpancho (PER)	15	17
G Pardo (BRA)	21	21
A Padmore (BAR)	13	12
V Soeroredjo (SUR)	6	8
2	E Go (USA)	21	21

Second Round
L Araujo (BRA)	21	16	17
7	E Anguiano (GUA)	18	21	21
S Sánchez (MEX)	10	13
4	K Cordón (GUA)	21	21
E Mendez (JAM)	6	12
O Guerrero (CUB)	21	21
G Pardo (BRA)	16	17
2	E Go (USA)	21	21

Quarterfinals
7	E Anguiano (GUA)	12	19
4	K Cordón (GUA)	21	21
O Guerrero (CUB)	15	19
E Go (USA)	21	21

Semifinals
4	K Cordón (GUA)	21	13	16
2	E Go (USA)	18	21	21
