= Osleni Guerrero =

Cuban badminton player (born 1989)

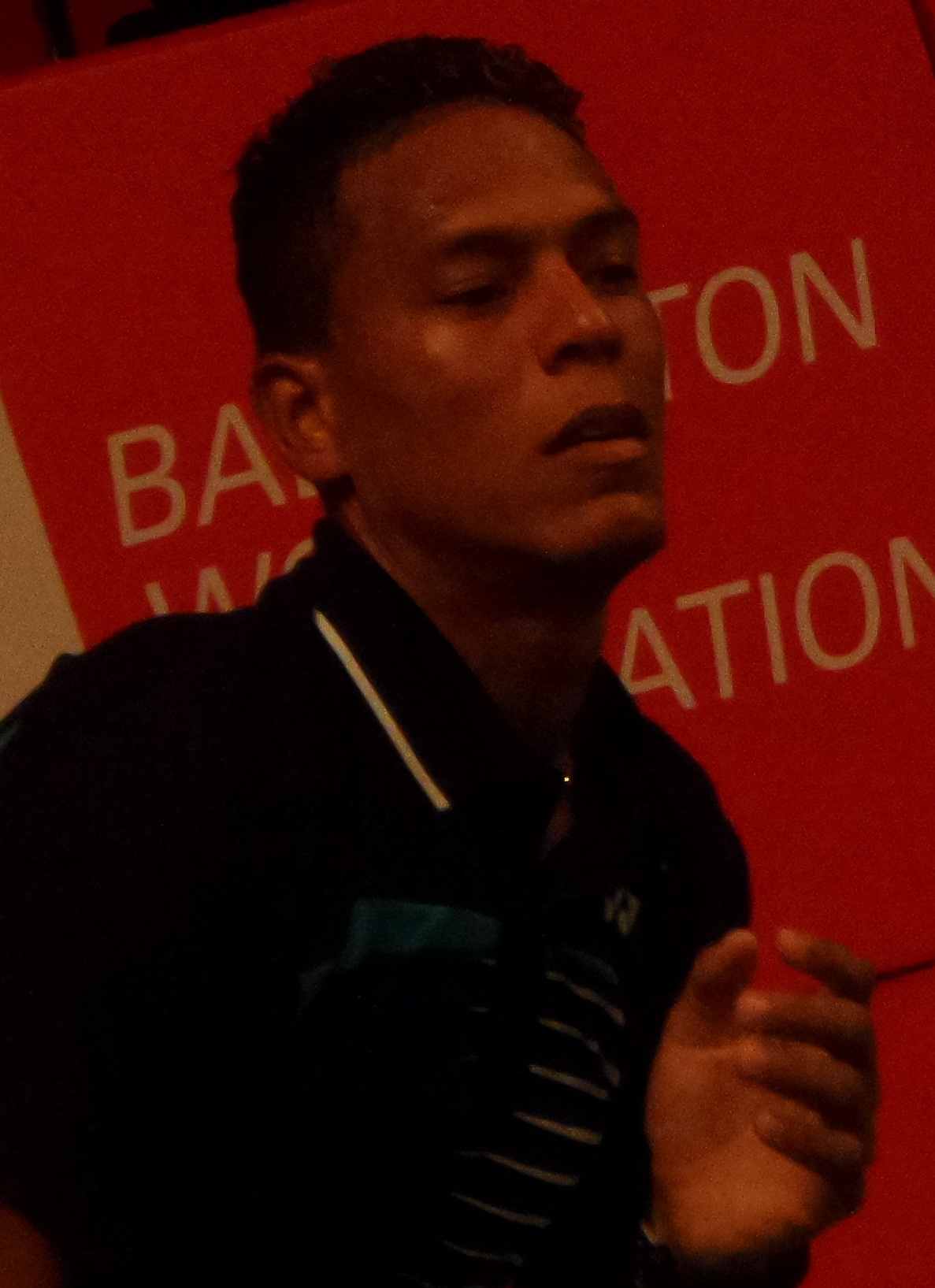
- Guerrero at the 2015 World Championships

Personal information
- Born: Osleni Guerrero Velazco; 18 October 1989 (age 37) Havana, Cuba
- Height: 1.89 m (6 ft 2 in)

Sport
- Country: Cuba
- Sport: Badminton
- Handedness: Right

Men's singles & doubles
- Highest ranking: 43 (MS 5 March 2015); 65 (MD 13 August 2019); 93 (XD 22 October 2019)
- Current ranking: 124 (MS), 139 (MD), 158 (XD) (26 April 2022)
- BWF profile
Medal record
Men's badminton
Representing Cuba
Pan American Games
Silver medal – second place	2011 Guadalajara	Men's singles
Bronze medal – third place	2015 Toronto	Men's singles
Bronze medal – third place	2019 Lima	Men's doubles
Pan Am Championships
Gold medal – first place	2013 Santo Domingo	Men's singles
Gold medal – first place	2014 Markham	Men's singles
Gold medal – first place	2019 Aguascalientes	Men's singles
Silver medal – second place	2012 Lima	Men's singles
Silver medal – second place	2017 Havana	Men's singles
Silver medal – second place	2019 Aguascalientes	Men's doubles
Bronze medal – third place	2018 Guatemala City	Men's singles
Central American and Caribbean Games
Gold medal – first place	2014 Veracruz	Mixed doubles
Gold medal – first place	2018 Barranquilla	Mixed doubles
Silver medal – second place	2014 Veracruz	Men's singles
Silver medal – second place	2018 Barranquilla	Men's singles
Silver medal – second place	2018 Barranquilla	Men's doubles
Silver medal – second place	2018 Barranquilla	Mixed team
Bronze medal – third place	2014 Veracruz	Mixed team

Osleni Guerrero Velazco (born 18 October 1989) is a Cuban badminton player. He is the first Cuban badminton player to win a medal in the Pan American Games. Guerrero also competed at the 2016 Summer Olympics.

== Career ==
Guerrero, born in Havana, started competing in badminton in 2000, and joined the national team in 2005. As a junior player he won the under-19 category at the 2007 Pan Am Junior Badminton Championships held at Puerto Vallarta, Mexico where he beat first seed Howard Shu of the US, 21–13, 21–10 in the final.

Guerrero won a bronze medal in the men's singles event at the 2015 Pan Am Games, losing the semi-final to Canadian Andrew D'Souza. In the 2011 Pan American Games he made history, reaching the final and a silver [an Am Games medal for Cuba at badminton for the first time. He eventually lost that final to first seeded Kevin Cordón of Guatemala with 13–21, 19–21.

Guerrero competed in 2014 and 2015 BWF World Championships. He is a member of the Cuban national badminton team since 2005. He twice won the continental Pan American Badminton Championship. First in 2013 at Santo Domingo, beating first seeded American Sattawat Pongnairat 17–21, 21–6, 21–16 in a close 51 minutes final. In 2014 at Markham venue, he successfully defended his Pan American badminton title, this time beating another American Bjorn Seguin in another close fought final of 58 minutes with 19–21, 21–14, and 21–13. Guerrero won many events in the Pan American Badminton circuit.

At the 2016 Rio Olympics, Guerrero played the men's singles event in Group J with Tommy Sugiarto of Indonesia, and Howard Shu of United States. He placed second in the group standing after won a match to Shu, but lost to Sugiarto. He won the silver medal at the 2017 Pan Am Championships defeated by the Brazilian Ygor Coelho de Oliveira in the final.

In 2018, he won four medals at the Central American and Caribbean Games, a gold medal in the mixed doubles, also three silver medals in the men's singles, doubles, and team events.

In 2019, he reached the finals at the Pan Am Championships in two different events, won a gold medal in the men's singles event.

== Achievements ==
=== Pan American Games ===
Men's singles
Year	Venue	Opponent	Score	Result
2011	Multipurpose Gymnasium, Guadalajara, Mexico	(Guatemala) Kevin Cordón	21–23, 19–21	Silver
2015	Atos Markham Pan Am Centre, Toronto, Canada	(Canada) Andrew D'Souza	21–13, 14–21, 13–21	Bronze

Men's doubles
Year	Venue	Partner	Opponent	Score	Result
2019	Polideportivo 3 Lima, Peru	(Cuba) Leodannis Martínez	(Canada) Jason Ho-shue (Canada) Nyl Yakura	21–23, 15–21	Bronze

=== Pan Am Championships ===
Men's singles
Year	Venue	Opponent	Score	Result
2012	Manuel Bonilla Stadium, Lima, Peru	(Guatemala) Kevin Cordón	20–22, 10–21	Silver
2013	Palacio de los Deportes Virgilio Travieso Soto, Santo Domingo, Dominican Republic	(United States) Sattawat Pongnairat	17–21, 21–6, 21–16	Gold
2014	Markham Pan Am Centre, Markham, Canada	(United States) Bjorn Seguin	19–21, 21–14, 21–13	Gold
2017	Sports City Coliseum, Havana, Cuba	(Brazil) Ygor Coelho	21–12, 16–21, 10–21	Silver
2018	Teodoro Palacios Flores Gymnasium, Guatemala City, Guatemala	(Brazil) Ygor Coelho	17–21, 7–21	Bronze
2019	Gimnasio Olímpico, Aguascalientes, Mexico	(Guatemala) Kevin Cordón	21–11, 22–20	Gold

Men's doubles
Year	Venue	Partner	Opponent	Score	Result
2019	Gimnasio Olímpico; Aguascalientes, Mexico	(Cuba) Leodannis Martínez	(Canada) Jason Ho-shue (Canada) Nyl Yakura	11–21, 22–20, 10–21	Silver

=== Central American and Caribbean Games ===
Men's singles
Year	Venue	Opponent	Score	Result
2014	Omega Complex, Veracruz, Mexico	(Guatemala) Kevin Cordón	22–20, 13–21, 22–24	Silver
2018	Coliseo Universidad del Norte, Barranquilla, Colombia	(Guatemala) Kevin Cordón	16–21, 21–14, 23–25	Silver

Men's doubles
Year	Venue	Partner	Opponent	Score	Result
2018	Coliseo Universidad del Norte; Barranquilla, Colombia	(Cuba) Leodannis Martínez	(Jamaica) Gareth Henry (Jamaica) Samuel Ricketts	12–21, 21–11, 19–21	Silver

Mixed doubles
Year	Venue	Partner	Opponent	Score	Result
2014	Omega Complex; Veracruz, Mexico	(Cuba) Taymara Oropesa	(Mexico) Job Castillo (Mexico) Sabrina Solis	16–21, 21–14, 21–13	Gold
2018	Coliseo Universidad del Norte; Barranquilla, Colombia	(Cuba) Adriana Artiz	(Cuba) Leodannis Martínez (Cuba) Taymara Oropesa	18–21, 21–17, 21–19	Gold

=== Pan Am Junior Championships ===
Boys' singles
Year	Venue	Opponent	Score	Result
2007	Puerto Vallarta, Mexico	(United States) Howard Shu	21–13, 21–10	Gold

=== BWF International Challenge/Series (33 titles, 17 runners-up) ===
Men's singles
Year	Tournament	Opponent	Score	Result
2009	Peru International	(Japan) Kimihiro Yamaguchi	16–21, 13–21	(silver) Runner-up
2010	Giraldilla International	(Cuba) Alexander Hernández	21–13, 21–17	(gold) Winner
2010	Internacional Mexicano	(New Zealand) Bjorn Seguin	17–21, 21–19, 21–17	(gold) Winner
2011	Giraldilla International	(Indonesia) Arief Gifar Ramadhan	19–21, 17–21	(silver) Runner-up
2012	Giraldilla International	(Jamaica) Charles Pyne	21–17, 21–19	(gold) Winner
2012	Peru International	(Malaysia) Tan Chun Seang	15–21, 11–21	(silver) Runner-up
2012	Venezuela International	(United States) Ilian Perez	21–17, 17–21, 21–15	(gold) Winner
2012	Suriname International	(Israel) Misha Zilberman	21–16, 18–21, 11–21	(silver) Runner-up
2013	Giraldilla International	(Czech Republic) Jan Fröhlich	21–19, 21–3	(gold) Winner
2013	Peru International	(Israel) Misha Zilbermann	17–21, 21–13, 21–11	(gold) Winner
2013	Venezuela International	(Guatemala) Heymard Humblers	21–14, 21–16	(gold) Winner
2013	Guatemala International	(Guatemala) Rodolfo Ramírez	10–21, 23–25	(silver) Runner-up
2013	Brazil International	(Chinese Taipei) Yang Chih-hsun	21–8, 18–21, 18–21	(silver) Runner-up
2013	Santo Domingo Open	(United States) Howard Shu	21–16, 21–6	(gold) Winner
2013	Suriname International	(Czech Republic) Jan Fröhlich	21–11, 21–18	(gold) Winner
2013	Internacional Mexicano	(Brazil) Daniel Paiola	21–16, 21–17	(gold) Winner
2014	Peru International	(United States) Hock Lai Lee	21–17, 21–13	(gold) Winner
2014	Venezuela International	(Brazil) Daniel Paiola	21–13, 21–8	(gold) Winner
2014	Brazil International	(Sweden) Henri Hurskainen	6–11, 7–11, 6–11	(silver) Runner-up
2015	Suriname International	(Czech Republic) Jan Fröhlich	21–7 retired	(gold) Winner
2014	Santo Domingo Open	(Austria) David Obernosterer	16–21, 21–16, 17–21	(silver) Runner-up
2015	Giraldilla International	(United States) Howard Shu	21–16, 21–16	(gold) Winner
2015	Chile International	(Turkey) Ramazan Öztürk	21–9, 21–15	(gold) Winner
2015	Internacional Mexicano	(Spain) Ernesto Velázquez	13–21, 14–21	(silver) Runner-up
2015	Suriname International	(United States) Howard Shu	21–11, 21–16	(gold) Winner
2016	Guatemala International	(Guatemala) Kevin Cordón	Walkover	(gold) Winner
2016	Giraldilla International	(Austria) Luka Wraber	21–16, 21–17	(gold) Winner
2016	Chile International	(Czech Republic) Jan Fröhlich	14–21, 21–8, 21–14	(gold) Winner
2017	Giraldilla International	(Italy) Rosario Maddaloni	21–15, 21–15	(gold) Winner
2017	Santo Domingo Open	(Mexico) Luis Ramón Garrido	12–21, 21–16, 21–12	(gold) Winner
2017	Suriname International	(Canada) Brian Yang	21–12, 17–21, 14–21	(silver) Runner-up
2018	Peru International	(Guatemala) Kevin Cordón	20–22, 21–14, 15–21	(silver) Runner-up
2018	Santo Domingo Open	(Italy) Rosario Maddaloni	21–13, 19–21, 21–18	(gold) Winner
2019	Mexico Future Series	(Mexico) Lino Muñoz	20–22, 21–18, 21–15	(gold) Winner

Men's doubles
Year	Tournament	Partner	Opponent	Score	Result
2012	Venezuela International	(Cuba) Ronald Toledo	(Guatemala) Rubén Castellanos (Guatemala) Adams Rodríguez	18–21, 21–8, 21–8	(gold) Winner
2017	Giraldilla International	(Cuba) Leodannis Martínez	(Italy) Lukas Osele (Italy) Kevin Strobl	21–11, 22–24, 21–8	(gold) Winner
2017	Santo Domingo Open	(Cuba) Leodannis Martínez	(Dominican Republic) Therry Aquino (Dominican Republic) Reimi Cabrera	21–12, 21–14	(gold) Winner
2018	Giraldilla International	(Cuba) Leodannis Martínez	(Cuba) Lázaro Madera (Cuba) Ernesto Reyes	21–10, 21–16	(gold) Winner
2018	Guatemala International	(Cuba) Leodannis Martínez	(Guatemala) Rubén Castellanos (Guatemala) Aníbal Marroquín	12–21, 17–21	(silver) Runner-up
2019	Peru Future Series	(Cuba) Leodannis Martínez	(Peru) Mario Cuba (Peru) Diego Mini	21–14, 21–17	(gold) Winner
2019	Mexico Future Series	(Cuba) Leodannis Martínez	(Mexico) Andrés López (Mexico) Luis Montoya	21–13, 21–19	(gold) Winner
2019	Santo Domingo Open	(Cuba) Leodannis Martínez	(Brazil) Fabrício Farias (Brazil) Francielton Farias	21–19, 21–16	(gold) Winner
2022	Santo Domingo Open	(Cuba) Leodannis Martínez	(Japan) Ayato Endo (Japan) Yuta Takei	13–21, 9–21	(silver) Runner-up

Mixed doubles
Year	Tournament	Partner	Opponent	Score	Result
2009	Giraldilla International	(Cuba) Solángel Guzmán	(Cuba) Alexander Hernández (Cuba) María L. Hernández	17–21, 12–21	(silver) Runner-up
2014	Giraldilla International	(Cuba) Taymara Oropesa	(Peru) Andrés Corpancho (Peru) Luz María Zornoza	21–16, 21–15	(gold) Winner
2017	Santo Domingo Open	(Cuba) Adriana Artiz	(Cuba) Leodannis Martínez (Cuba) Taymara Oropesa	11–21, 21–13, 15–21	(silver) Runner-up
2018	Jamaica International	(Cuba) Yeily Ortiz	(Cuba) Leodannis Martínez (Cuba) Taymara Oropesa	22–20, 21–15	(silver) Runner-up
2018	Giraldilla International	(Cuba) Adriana Artiz	(Cuba) Leodannis Martínez (Cuba) Taymara Oropesa	21–13, 13–21, 21–19	(gold) Winner
2019	Peru Future Series	(Cuba) Taymara Oropesa	(United States) Vinson Chiu (United States) Breanna Chi	20–22, 9–21	(silver) Runner-up
2019	Mexico Future Series	(Cuba) Taymara Oropesa	(Mexico) Luis Montoya (Mexico) Vanessa Villalobos	22–20, 15–21, 21–16	(gold) Winner

BWF International Challenge tournament
BWF International Series tournament
BWF Future Series tournament
