= Badminton at the 2019 Pan American Games =

- Badminton pictogram
- Venue: Polideportivo 3
- Dates: July 29 – August 2, 2019
- No. of events: 5 (2 men, 2 women, 1 mixed)
- Competitors: 88 from 22 nations

Badminton competitions at the 2019 Pan American Games in Lima, Peru were held between July 29 and August 2, 2019 at the Polideportivo 3, which also hosted the roller sports (artistic) and table tennis competitions.

Five medal events were contested: singles and doubles for men and women and a mixed doubles event. A total of 88 athletes from 22 nations competed. A total of five NOC's won medals.

The event awarded ranking points towards selection for the 2020 Summer Olympics in Tokyo, Japan.

== Medal table ==
Rank	Nation	Gold	Silver	Bronze	Total
1	Canada	4	3	1	8
2	Brazil	1	0	4	5
3	United States	0	2	2	4
4	Guatemala	0	0	2	2
5	Cuba	0	0	1	1
Totals (5 entries)		5	5	10	20

== Medalists ==
Event	Gold	Silver	Bronze
Men's singles	Ygor Coelho; Brazil	Brian Yang; Canada	Jason Ho-Shue; Canada
Men's singles	Ygor Coelho; Brazil	Brian Yang; Canada	Kevin Cordón; Guatemala
Women's singles	Michelle Li; Canada	Rachel Honderich; Canada	Iris Wang; United States
Women's singles	Michelle Li; Canada	Rachel Honderich; Canada	Nikté Sotomayor; Guatemala
Men's doubles	Canada; Jason Ho-Shue; Nyl Yakura	United States; Phillip Chew; Ryan Chew	Cuba; Osleni Guerrero; Leodannis Martínez
Men's doubles	Canada; Jason Ho-Shue; Nyl Yakura	United States; Phillip Chew; Ryan Chew	Brazil; Fabrício Farias; Francielton Farias
Women's doubles	Canada; Rachel Honderich; Kristen Tsai	United States; Keui-Ya Chen; Jamie Hsu	Brazil; Tamires Santos; Fabiana Silva
Women's doubles	Canada; Rachel Honderich; Kristen Tsai	United States; Keui-Ya Chen; Jamie Hsu	Brazil; Jaqueline Lima; Sâmia Lima
Mixed doubles	Canada; Joshua Hurlburt-Yu; Josephine Wu	Canada; Nyl Yakura; Kristen Tsai	Brazil; Fabrício Farias; Jaqueline Lima
Mixed doubles	Canada; Joshua Hurlburt-Yu; Josephine Wu	Canada; Nyl Yakura; Kristen Tsai	United States; Howard Shu; Paula Lynn Obañana

== Participating nations ==
A total of 22 countries qualified athletes. The number of athletes a nation entered is in parentheses beside the name of the country. Bolivia, Colombia, Costa Rica and Panama all made their sport debuts at the Pan American Games.

- Argentina (2)
- Barbados (4)
- Bolivia (1)
- Brazil (8)
- Canada (8)
- Chile (4)
- Colombia (1)
- Costa Rica (2)
- Cuba (6)
- Dominican Republic (6)
- Ecuador (2)
- El Salvador (2)
- Guatemala (7)
- Guyana (2)
- Jamaica (4)
- Mexico (6)
- Panama (2)
- Peru (8)
- Suriname (2)
- Trinidad and Tobago (1)
- United States (8)
- Venezuela (2)

== Qualification ==
A total of 88 badminton athletes qualified compete. Each nation may enter a maximum of 8 athletes (four per gender). As host nation, Peru automatically qualified a full team of eights athletes. All other quotas were awarded through the team world rankings as of February 28, 2019. Each nation's highest ranked athlete/pair's points in each of the five events were added to determine a country's point total.

== See also ==
- Badminton at the 2019 Parapan American Games
- Badminton at the 2020 Summer Olympics
