= La Unión, Zacapa =

Coordinates: 14.9667°N 89.2833°W

La Unión is a municipality in the Guatemalan department of Zacapa.
