= Timothy Lam =

American badminton player (born 1997)

Timothy Lam 林恩偕
Personal information
- Born: 24 August 1997 (age 29) Hong Kong
- Height: 1.78 m (5 ft 10 in)

Sport
- Country: United States
- Sport: Badminton

Men's singles & doubles
- Highest ranking: 85 (MS 4 May 2021); 401 (MD with Antonio Li 10 September 2019)
- Current ranking: 87 (MS 8 June 2021)
- BWF profile
Medal record
Men's badminton
Representing United States
Pan Am Mixed Team Championships
Silver medal – second place	2019 Lima	Mixed team
Bronze medal – third place	2017 Santo Domingo	Mixed team
Pan Am Men's Team Championships
Bronze medal – third place	2020 Salvador	Men's team
Pan Am Junior Championships
Gold medal – first place	2014 Guatemala City	Boys' singles
Gold medal – first place	2014 Guatemala City	Mixed team
Silver medal – second place	2014 Guatemala City	Boys' doubles
Bronze medal – third place	2014 Guatemala City	Mixed doubles

Timothy Lam (born 24 August 1997) is an American badminton player and coach. He competed at the 2019 Pan American Games finished in the quarter-finals stage. In 2021, Lam was confirmed as qualifying to compete for the US at the delayed 2020 Tokyo Olympics.

== Achievements ==
=== Pan Am Junior Championships ===
Boys' singles
Year	Venue	Opponent	Score	Result
2014	Gimnasio Teodoro Palacios Flores, Guatemala City, Guatemala	(Jamaica) Samuel Ricketts	22–20, 21–13	Gold

Boys' doubles
Year	Venue	Partner	Opponent	Score	Result
2014	Gimnasio Teodoro Palacios Flores; Guatemala City, Guatemala	(United States) Justin Ma	(Jamaica) Samuel Ricketts (Jamaica) Sean Wilson	18–21, 16–21	Silver

Mixed doubles
Year	Venue	Partner	Opponent	Score	Result
2014	Gimnasio Teodoro Palacios Flores; Guatemala City, Guatemala	(United States) Annie Xu	(United States) Darren Yang (United States) Victoria Chen	17–21, 16–21	Bronze

=== BWF International Challenge/Series (1 title, 4 runners-up) ===
Men's singles
Year	Tournament	Opponent	Score	Result
2018	Guatemala International	(Guatemala) Kevin Cordón	12–21, 13–21	(silver) Runner-up
2018	Bahrain International	(Azerbaijan) Ade Resky Dwicahyo	13–21, 13–21	(silver) Runner-up
2019	Carebaco International	(England) Sam Parsons	13–21, 11–21	(silver) Runner-up
2019	Zambia International	(Algeria) Youcef Sabri Medel	21–13, 21–7	(gold) Winner

Men's doubles
Year	Tournament	Partner	Opponent	Score	Result
2019	Carebaco International	(Canada) Antonio Li	(Jamaica) Gareth Henry (Jamaica) Samuel Ricketts	9–21, 16–21	(silver) Runner-up

BWF International Challenge tournament
BWF International Series tournament
BWF Future Series tournament

== Personal life ==
Lam graduated in 2018 in accounting from California State Polytechnic University, Pomona (Cal Poly Pomona) in Pomona, California.
