= 2014 Pan Am Badminton Championships =

2014 badminton championship

The XIX 2014 Pan Am Badminton Championships were held in Markham, Canada, between October 13 and October 19, 2014.

This event was part of the 2014 BWF Grand Prix Gold and Grand Prix series of the Badminton World Federation.

== Venue ==
- Markham Pan Am Centre, within the Greater Toronto Area of Ontario, Canada.

== Medalists ==
Event	Gold	Silver	Bronze
Men's singles	(Cuba) Osleni Guerrero	(United States) Bjorn Seguin	(United States) Howard Shu
Men's singles	(Cuba) Osleni Guerrero	(United States) Bjorn Seguin	(Brazil) Daniel Paiola
Women's singles	(Canada) Michelle Li	(Canada) Rachel Honderich	(Brazil) Fabiana Silva
Women's singles	(Canada) Michelle Li	(Canada) Rachel Honderich	(United States) Jamie Subandhi
Men's doubles	(Canada) Adrian Liu and Derrick Ng	(United States) Phillip Chew and Sattawat Pongnairat	(Guatemala) Kevin Cordon and Anibal Marroquin
Men's doubles	(Canada) Adrian Liu and Derrick Ng	(United States) Phillip Chew and Sattawat Pongnairat	(United States) Matthew Fogarty and Bjorn Seguin
Women's doubles	(United States) Eva Lee and Paula Lynn Obanana	(Brazil) Lohaynny Vicente and Luana Vicente	(Canada) Alexandra Bruce and Phyllis Chan
Women's doubles	(United States) Eva Lee and Paula Lynn Obanana	(Brazil) Lohaynny Vicente and Luana Vicente	(Canada) Anne-Julie Beaulieu and Vicky Girard
Mixed doubles	(Canada) Toby Ng and Alexandra Bruce	(United States) Phillip Chew and Jamie Subandhi	(Peru) Mario Cuba and Katherine Winder
Mixed doubles	(Canada) Toby Ng and Alexandra Bruce	(United States) Phillip Chew and Jamie Subandhi	(Peru) Andres Corpancho and Luz Maria Zornoza
Teams	Canada	United States	Brazil
