= Sattawat Pongnairat =

American badminton player (born 1990)

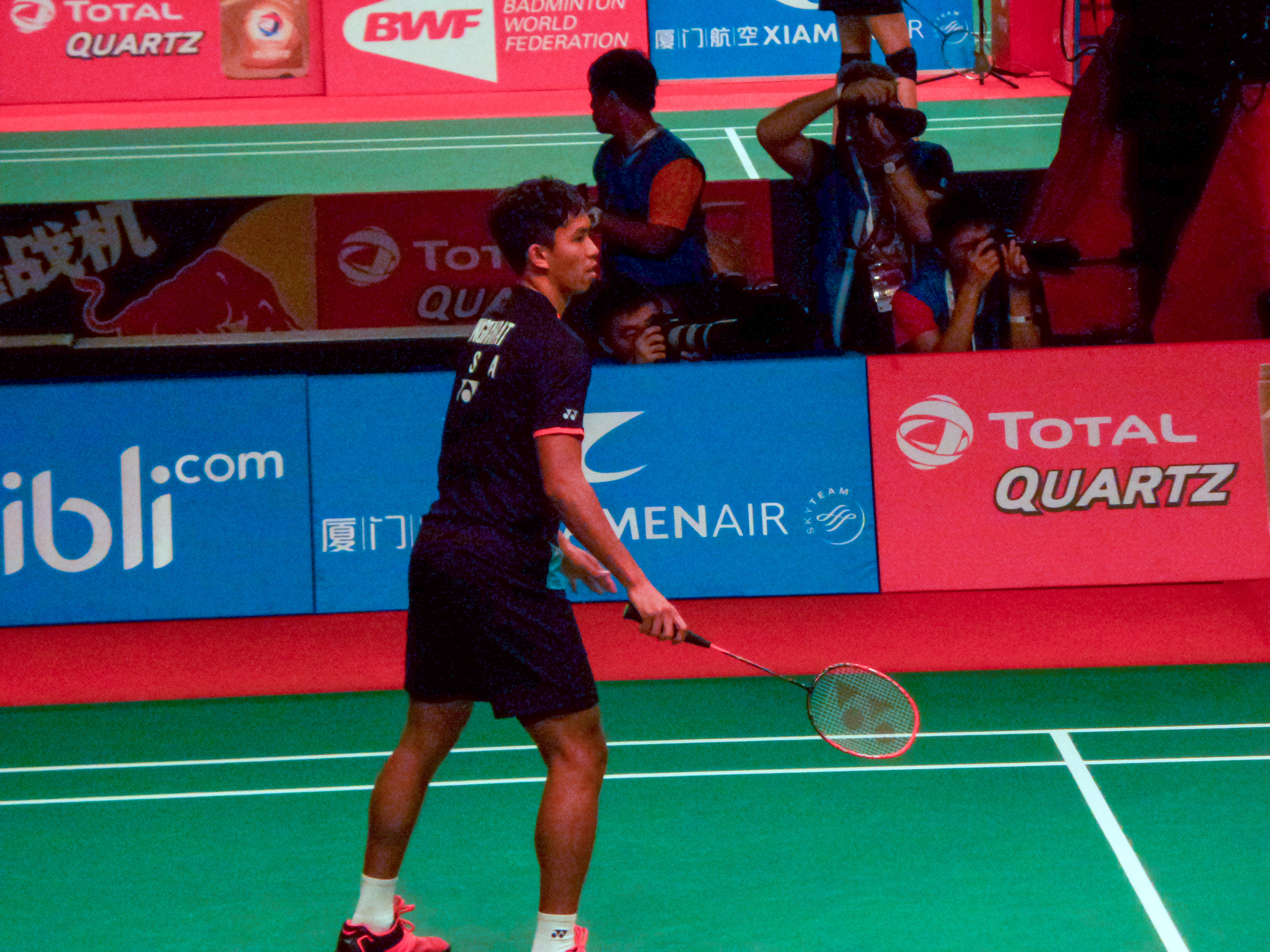
- Pongnairat in 2015

Personal information
- Born: May 8, 1990 (age 36) New York City, United States
- Height: 1.80 m (5 ft 11 in)
- Weight: 66 kg (146 lb)

Sport
- Country: United States
- Sport: Badminton
- Handedness: Right
- Coached by: Zi Min Cai, Rudy Gunawan, Ignatius Rusli

Men's singles & doubles
- Highest ranking: 44 (MS November 14, 2013); 28 (MD March 26, 2015); 125 (XD September 15, 2011)
- BWF profile
Medal record
Men's badminton
Representing United States
Pan American Games
Gold medal – first place	2015 Toronto	Men's doubles
Silver medal – second place	2011 Guadalajara	Men's doubles
Pan Am Championships
Silver medal – second place	2010 Curitiba	Mixed team
Silver medal – second place	2012 Lima	Mixed team
Silver medal – second place	2013 Santo Domingo	Men's singles
Silver medal – second place	2013 Santo Domingo	Mixed team
Silver medal – second place	2014 Markham	Men's doubles
Silver medal – second place	2014 Markham	Mixed team
Bronze medal – third place	2010 Curitiba	Men's singles
Bronze medal – third place	2010 Curitiba	Mixed doubles
Pan Am Men's Team Championships
Silver medal – second place	2018 Tacarigua	Men's team
Bronze medal – third place	2020 Salvador	Men's team

Sattawat Pongnairat (Thai: ศตวรรษ พงษ์นัยรัตน์; RTGS: Sattawat Phongnairat; born May 8, 1990) is an American badminton player who competed at 2016 Summer Olympics in Rio de Janeiro, Brazil. He trained at the Orange County Badminton club, and in 2015, he won a gold medal in men's doubles with teammate Phillip Chew at the Pan American Games.

== Achievements ==
=== Pan American Games ===
Men's doubles
Year	Venue	Partner	Opponent	Score	Result
2015	Atos Markham Pan Am Centre; Toronto, Canada	(United States) Phillip Chew	(Brazil) Hugo Arthuso (Brazil) Daniel Paiola	21–18, 21–16	Gold
2011	Multipurpose Gymnasium; Guadalajara, Mexico	(United States) Halim Haryanto	(United States) Tony Gunawan (United States) Howard Bach	10–21, 14–21	Silver

=== Pan Am Championships ===
Men's singles
Year	Venue	Opponent	Score	Result
2013	Palacio de los Deportes Virgilio Travieso Soto; Santo Domingo, Dominican Republic	(Cuba) Osleni Guerrero	21–17, 6–21, 16–21	Silver
2010	Clube Curitibano, Curitiba, Brazil	(Canada) Stephan Wojcikiewicz	21–15, 16–21, 19–21	Bronze

Men's doubles
Year	Venue	Partner	Opponent	Score	Result
2014	Markham Pan Am Centre; Markham, Canada	(United States) Phillip Chew	(Canada) Adrian Liu (Canada) Derrick Ng	15–21, 13–21	Silver

Mixed doubles
Year	Venue	Partner	Opponent	Score	Result
2010	Clube Curitibano; Curitiba, Brazil	(United States) Cee Nantana Ketpura	(Canada) Kevin Li (Canada) Alex Bruce	11–21, 16–21	Bronze

=== BWF International Challenge/Series ===
Men's singles
Year	Tournament	Opponent	Score	Result
2012	Miami International	(Malaysia) Lim Fang Yang	19–21, 18–21	(silver) Runner-up

Men's doubles
Year	Tournament	Partner	Opponent	Score	Result
2018	Yonex / K&D Graphics International	(Indonesia) Ferdinand Sinarta Surbakti	(Canada) Joshua Hurlburt-Yu (Canada) Duncan Yao	21–18, 16–21, 18–21	(silver) Runner-up
2016	Tahiti International	(United States) Phillip Chew	(Poland) Adam Cwalina (Poland) Przemyslaw Wacha	5–9 Retired	(silver) Runner-up
2015	Chile International Challenge	(United States) Phillip Chew	(Canada) Adrian Liu (Canada) Derrick Ng	13–21, 22–20, 15–21	(silver) Runner-up
2015	Mercosul International	(United States) Phillip Chew	(Belgium) Matijs Dierickx (Belgium) Freek Golinski	13–21, 21–8, 19–21	(silver) Runner-up
2014	Sydney International	(United States) Phillip Chew	(China) Bao Zilong (China) Qi Shuangshuang	6–11, 7–11, 3–11	(silver) Runner-up
2013	Peru International	(United States) Phillip Chew	(Netherlands) Ruud Bosch (Netherlands) Koen Ridder	18–21, 11–21	(silver) Runner-up
2012	Brazil International	(United States) Phillip Chew	(Malaysia) Gan Teik Chai (Malaysia) Ong Soon Hock	14–21, 14–21	(silver) Runner-up
2011	Miami International	(United States) Phillip Chew	(Brazil) Hugo Arthuso (Brazil) Daniel Paiola	16–21, 21–18, 9–21	(silver) Runner-up

Mixed doubles
Year	Tournament	Partner	Opponent	Score	Result
2018	Yonex / K&D Graphics International	(United States) Kerry Xu	(Canada) Joshua Hurlburt-Yu (Canada) Josephine Wu	16–21, 13–21	(silver) Runner-up
2017	Yonex / K&D Graphics International	(United States) Kuei-Ya Chen	(Canada) Toby Ng (Canada) Josephine Wu	19–21, 15–21	(silver) Runner-up

BWF International Challenge tournament
BWF International Series tournament
BWF Future Series tournament
