= Howard Shu =

American badminton player (born 1990)

Howard Shu 舒之颢
Personal information
- Born: Howard Shu; November 28, 1990 (age 35) Los Alamitos, California, U.S.
- Height: 6 ft 1 in (1.85 m)
- Weight: 165 lb (75 kg)

Sport
- Country: United States
- Sport: Badminton
- Handedness: Right

Men's singles & mixed doubles
- Highest ranking: 53 (MS June 25, 2015); 229 (XD October 14, 2010); 37 (XD March 12, 2015)
- BWF profile
Medal record
Men's badminton
Representing the United States
Pan American Games
Bronze medal – third place	2015 Toronto	Men's singles
Bronze medal – third place	2019 Lima	Mixed doubles
Pan Am Championships
Silver medal – second place	2013 Santo Domingo	Mixed doubles
Bronze medal – third place	2012 Lima	Men's singles
Bronze medal – third place	2013 Santo Domingo	Men's singles
Bronze medal – third place	2014 Markham	Men's singles
Pan Am Men's Team Championships
Silver medal – second place	2018 Tacarigua	Men's team
Bronze medal – third place	2020 Salvador	Men's team
Pan Am Mixed Team Championships
Gold medal – first place	2013 Santo Domingo	Mixed team
Silver medal – second place	2023 Guadalajara	Mixed team
Bronze medal – third place	2017 Santo Domingo	Mixed team

Howard Shu (born November 28, 1990) is a two-time Olympic badminton player for Team USA. Shu began playing badminton at age 8. His father, who played in Taiwan, encouraged Shu to join him at local badminton clubs, and entered him into the Junior Nationals. Shu competed at the 2016 Summer Olympics in Rio de Janeiro, Brazil, and the 2024 Summer Olympics in Paris, France.

== Achievements ==
=== Pan American Games ===
Men's singles
Year	Venue	Opponent	Score	Result
2015	Atos Markham Pan Am Centre, Toronto, Canada	(Guatemala) Kevin Cordón	21–19, 14–21, 18–21	Bronze

Mixed doubles
Year	Venue	Partner	Opponent	Score	Result
2019	Polideportivo 3 Lima, Peru	(United States) Paula Lynn Obañana	(Canada) Nyl Yakura (Canada) Kristen Tsai	15–21, 15–21	Bronze

=== Pan Am Championships ===
Men's singles
Year	Venue	Opponent	Score	Result
2012	Manuel Bonilla Stadium, Lima, Peru	(Guatemala) Kevin Cordón	15–21, 21–18, 13–21	Bronze
2013	Palacio de los Deportes Virgilio Travieso Soto, Santo Domingo, Dominican Republic	(Cuba) Osleni Guerrero	15–21, 17–21	Bronze
2014	Markham Pan Am Centre, Markham, Canada	(Cuba) Osleni Guerrero	14–21, 14–21	Bronze

Mixed doubles
Year	Venue	Partner	Opponent	Score	Result
2013	Palacio de los Deportes Virgilio Travieso Soto, Santo Domingo, Dominican Republic	(United States) Eva Lee	(Canada) Toby Ng (Canada) Alex Bruce	21–9, 14–21, 21–8	Silver

=== BWF Grand Prix (1 runner-up) ===
The BWF Grand Prix had two levels, the Grand Prix and Grand Prix Gold. It was a series of badminton tournaments sanctioned by the Badminton World Federation (BWF) and played between 2007 and 2017.

Mixed doubles
Year	Tournament	Partner	Opponent	Score	Result
2014	U.S. Open Grand Prix	(United States) Eva Lee	(Germany) Peter Käsbauer (Germany) Isabel Herttrich	12–21, 14–21	(silver) Runner-up

BWF Grand Prix Gold tournament
BWF Grand Prix tournament

=== BWF International Challenge/Series (11 titles, 9 runners-up) ===
Men's singles
Year	Tournament	Opponent	Score	Result
2011	Carebaco International	(Guatemala) Rodolfo Ramírez	14–21, 21–17, 22–20	(gold) Winner
2013	Santo Domingo Open	(Cuba) Osleni Guerrero	12–21, 21–23	(silver) Runner-up
2014	Puerto Rico International	(Brazil) Ygor Coelho	16–21, 19–21	(silver) Runner-up
2015	Giraldilla International	(Cuba) Osleni Guerrero	16–21, 16–21	(silver) Runner-up
2015	Nigeria International	(Austria) Luka Wraber	17–21, 21–14, 21–13	(gold) Winner
2015	New Caledonia International	(Chinese Taipei) Yang Chih-hsun	21–9, 21–19	(gold) Winner
2015	Puerto Rico International	(Guatemala) Kevin Cordón	17–21, 15–21	(silver) Runner-up
2015	Suriname International	(Cuba) Osleni Guerrero	11–21, 16–21	(silver) Runner-up
2015	South Africa International	(Turkey) Emre Vural	21–11, 21–16	(gold) Winner
2015	Botswana International	(Italy) Rosario Maddaloni	21–14, 21–11	(gold) Winner
2019	El Salvador International	(El Salvador) Uriel Canjura	11–21, 21–11, 13–21	(silver) Runner-up
2020	Internacional Mexicano	(Mexico) Job Castillo	7–21, 21–15, 11–21	(silver) Runner-up
2023	French Guiana International	(Germany) Camilo Borst	21–12, 21–16	(gold) Winner

Mixed doubles
Year	Tournament	Partner	Opponent	Score	Result
2014	Guatemala International	(United States) Eva Lee	(United States) Phillip Chew (United States) Jamie Subandhi	10–11, 11–5, 11–10, 8–11, 11–5	(gold) Winner
2016	Yonex / K&D Graphics International	(United States) Jamie Subandhi	(Russia) Evgenij Dremin (Russia) Evgenia Dimova	6–21, 20–22	(silver) Runner-up
2019	Uganda International	(United States) Paula Lynn Obañana	(United States) Vinson Chiu (United States) Breanna Chi	21–9, 21–12	(gold) Winner
2019	Mauritius International	(United States) Paula Lynn Obañana	(United States) Vinson Chiu (United States) Breanna Chi	17–21, 16–21	(silver) Runner-up
2019	Peru International	(United States) Paula Lynn Obañana	(Brazil) Fabrício Farias (Brazil) Jaqueline Lima	21–17, 22–20	(gold) Winner
2019	Benin International	(United States) Paula Lynn Obañana	(Australia) Pit Seng Low (Australia) Louisa Ma	21–12, 21–13	(gold) Winner
2019	Côte d'Ivoire International	(United States) Paula Lynn Obañana	(Egypt) Ahmed Salah (Egypt) Hadia Hosny	21–16, 21–14	(gold) Winner

BWF International Challenge tournament
BWF International Series tournament
BWF Future Series tournament
