= Ygor Coelho =

Brazilian badminton player (born 1996)

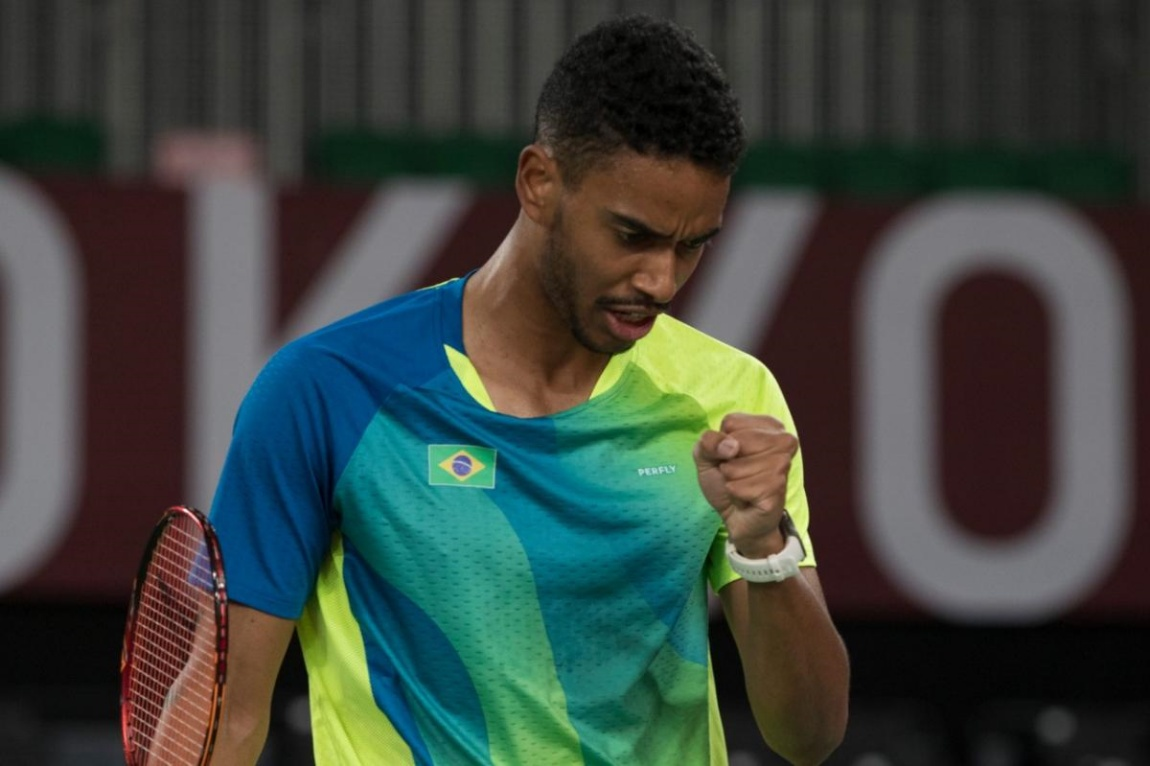
- Coelho in 2020

Personal information
- Born: Ygor Coelho de Oliveira; 24 November 1996 (age 29) Rio de Janeiro, Brazil
- Height: 1.78 m (5 ft 10 in)
- Weight: 70 kg (154 lb)

Sport
- Country: Brazil
- Sport: Badminton
- Handedness: Right

Men's singles
- Highest ranking: 30 (15 March 2018)
- Current ranking: 51 (27 August 2024)
- BWF profile
Medal record
Men's badminton
Representing Brazil
Pan American Games
Gold medal – first place	2019 Lima	Men's singles
Pan American Championships
Gold medal – first place	2017 Havana	Men's singles
Gold medal – first place	2018 Guatemala City	Men's singles
Bronze medal – third place	2022 San Salvador	Men's singles
Bronze medal – third place	2023 Kingston	Men's singles
Bronze medal – third place	2024 Guatemala City	Men's singles
Pan Am Mixed Team Championships
Silver medal – second place	2016 Campinas	Mixed team
Silver medal – second place	2017 Santo Domingo	Mixed team
Bronze medal – third place	2023 Guadalajara	Mixed team
Bronze medal – third place	2025 Aguascalientes	Mixed team
Pan Am Male Cup
Silver medal – second place	2022 Acapulco	Men's team
Silver medal – second place	2024 São Paulo	Men's team
South American Games
Gold medal – first place	2018 Cochabamba	Men's singles
Gold medal – first place	2018 Cochabamba	Men's doubles
Gold medal – first place	2018 Cochabamba	Mixed team

Ygor Coelho de Oliveira (Brazilian Portuguese pronunciation: [ˈiɡoʁ kuˈeʎu dʒi oliˈvejɾɐ]; born 24 November 1996) is a Brazilian badminton player. He won the Pan Am Junior Badminton Championships six times in the boys' singles and four times in the mixed doubles event with Lohaynny Vicente. Oliveira placed 27th in the world junior ranking and went on to compete at the 2014 Summer Youth Olympics in Nanjing, China. He won his first senior international title at the 2014 Puerto Rico International in the men's singles event. He competed at the 2016 Summer Olympics in Rio de Janeiro, Brazil, and became the first Brazil's male Olympic badminton player. He clinched three gold medals at the 2018 South American Games in the men's singles, doubles, and team event. Coelho won a gold medal in the men's singles at the 2019 Lima Pan American Games.

He competed at the 2020 Summer Olympics and the 2024 Summer Olympics.

== Career ==
At the 2019 Pan American Games held in Lima, Ygor achieved his greatest title, winning the gold medal. It was the country's first gold in the sport at the Pan American Games.

Ygor obtained the silver medal in the Pan Am Male Cup in the Acapulco 2022 and São Paulo 2024 editions.

At the Pan Am Mixed Team Championships, he won silver in Campinas 2016, in Santo Domingo 2017, and bronze in Guadalajara 2023.

At the Pan American Badminton Championships, in singles, he was two-time champion in the Havana 2017 and Guatemala 2018 editions, and obtained bronze in the San Salvador 2022, Kingston 2023 and Guatemala 2024 editions.

At the Badminton World Championships, Ygor's best result was obtained in Nanjing 2018, when he defeated Indian Prannoy H. S., 11th seed of the tournament and former top 10 in the world, thus reaching the Round of 16, the best result in Brazil's history.

At the 2020 Olympic Games, Ygor managed to win one game in the group stage, but failed to qualify for the round of 16. He was, however, the first Brazilian to win a badminton match at the Olympic Games.

== Achievements ==
=== Pan American Games ===
Men's singles
Year	Venue	Opponent	Score	Result
2019	Polideportivo 3 Lima, Peru	(Canada) Brian Yang	21–19, 21–10	Gold

=== Pan Am Championships ===
Men's singles
Year	Venue	Opponent	Score	Result
2017	Sports City Coliseum; Havana, Cuba	(Cuba) Osleni Guerrero	12–21, 21–16, 21–10	Gold
2018	Teodoro Palacios Flores Gymnasium; Guatemala City, Guatemala	(Canada) Jason Ho-Shue	21–12, 21–15	Gold
2022	Palacio de los Deportes Carlos "El Famoso" Hernández; San Salvador, El Salvador	(Canada) Brian Yang	21–17, 10–21, 8–21	Bronze
2023	G.C. Foster College of Physical Education and Sport; Kingston, Jamaica	(Canada) Brian Yang	21–16, 14–21, 19–21	Bronze
2024	Teodoro Palacios Flores Gymnasium, Guatemala City, Guatemala	(Guatemala) Kevin Cordón	19–21, 19–21	Bronze

=== South American Games ===
Men's singles
Year	Venue	Opponent	Score	Result
2018	Evo Morales Coliseum; Cochabamba, Bolivia	(Brazil) Artur Pomoceno	19–21, 23–21, 21–12	Gold

Men's doubles
Year	Venue	Partner	Opponent	Score	Result
2018	Evo Morales Coliseum; Cochabamba, Bolivia	(Brazil) Artur Pomoceno	(Peru) Bruno Barrueto (Peru) Diego Mini	23–21, 21–18	Gold

=== BWF International Challenge/Series (6 titles, 7 runners-up) ===
Men's singles
Year	Tournament	Opponent	Score	Result
2014	Puerto Rico International	(United States) Howard Shu	21–16, 21–19	(gold) Winner
2015	Guatemala International	(Guatemala) Kevin Cordón	20–22, 11–21	(silver) Runner-up
2015	Brazil International	(Guatemala) Kevin Cordón	21–18, 20–22, 21–19	(gold) Winner
2016	Peru International	(Canada) Martin Giuffre	21–11, 21–11	(gold) Winner
2017	Brazil International	(Sri Lanka) Niluka Karunaratne	21–9, 14–21, 14–21	(silver) Runner-up
2017	Polish Open	(Malaysia) Tan Jia Wei	13–21, 22–20, 10–21	(silver) Runner-up
2017	Peru International	(Italy) Rosario Maddaloni	21–12, 23–21	(gold) Winner
2018	Brazil International	(Russia) Sergey Sirant	21–18, 21–14	(gold) Winner
2019	Scottish Open	(India) Lakshya Sen	21–18, 18–21, 19–21	(silver) Runner-up
2021	Peru International	(Canada) Brian Yang	16–21, 18–21	(silver) Runner-up
2023	Brazil International	(Guatemala) Kevin Cordón	20–22, 21–14, 16–21	(silver) Runner-up
2023	Guatemala International	(Guatemala) Kevin Cordón	17–21, 21–11, 23–21	(gold) Winner
2023	El Salvador International	(Guatemala) Kevin Cordón	17–21, 21–15, 19–21	(silver) Runner-up

BWF International Challenge tournament
BWF International Series tournament
BWF Future Series tournament
