= Stephan Wojcikiewicz =

Canadian badminton player

Personal information
- Born: 23 June 1980 (age 46) Ottawa, Ontario, Canada
- Height: 1.85 m (6 ft 1 in)
- Weight: 80 kg (176 lb)

Sport
- Country: Canada
- Sport: Badminton

Men's singles
- Highest ranking: 50 (4 November 2010)
- BWF profile
Medal record
Badminton
Representing Canada
Pan Am Championships
Gold medal – first place	2010 Curitiba	Men's singles
Gold medal – first place	2010 Curitiba	Mixed team
Gold medal – first place	2007 Calgary	Men's singles
Silver medal – second place	2009 Guadalajara	Men's singles
Silver medal – second place	2008 Lima	Men's singles
Silver medal – second place	2001 Lima	Men's singles

Stephan Wojcikiewicz (born June 23, 1980 in Ottawa, Ontario) is a male badminton player from Canada.

== Career ==
Wojcikiewicz won the 2007 Pan American Badminton Championship, defeating Andrew Dabeka: 21-17, 22-20. He won the Canadian National Championship in 2004 and was runner-up in 2008. He also played on Canada's Thomas Cup team in the 2008 finals in Jakarta, Indonesia. In 2010 he became Pan American Champion yet again, defeating Rodrigo Pacheco 15-21, 21-17, 21-13.

Wojcikiewicz was a semifinalist at the 2008 Portuguese Open, quarterfinalist at the 2007 Polish Open and semifinalist in the U.S. Open, Spanish Open, Czech Open, Cuba International, and VIII Miami Pan Am International in 2006.

He trains at the International Badminton Academy in Copenhagen, Denmark and is coached by Michael Kjeldsen. In the 2008 and 2007 seasons he played for Herlev/Hjorten Badminton Club in Europe's Division 1 League and in 2006 for Gladsaxe Badminton Club, Europe's Division 3, both in Copenhagen.
