= 2017 Bolivarian Games =

International multi-sport event

XVIII Bolivarian Games
- Host city: Santa Marta
- Country: Colombia
- Nations: 11
- Events: 54 sports
- Opening: November 11, 2017
- Closing: November 25, 2017
- Opened by: Clara Luz Roldán
- Torch lighter: Paulo Villar
- Main venue: Estadio Sierra Nevada
- Website: www.juegosbolivarianos2017.gov.co

The 2017 Bolivarian Games, officially the XVIII Bolivarian Games, was an international multi-sport event that was held from 11–25 November 2017, in Santa Marta, Colombia.

== Host city selection ==
Ciudad Bolivar (Venezuela) and Santa Marta (Colombia) were the cities which decided to bid for hosting the Games. However, only Santa Marta submitted the official candidacy and later selected by ODEBO to host the 2017 Bolivarian Games.

== Mascot ==
The mascot for these games was Ajaytuké, a sea urchin. The reason behind the choice of the mascot by the organizer is to convey the message to protect the animal and coral reefs.

== Sports ==
The game featured 469 events from 54 disciplines and 34 sports in this edition of Bolivarian Games.

- Aquatics
  - Diving
  - Open water swimming
  - Swimming
  - Synchronized swimming
  - Water polo
- Archery
- Athletics
- Badminton
- Baseball
- Basketball
- Bowling
- Boxing
- Canoeing
- Cycling
  - BMX racing
  - Mountain biking
  - Road racing
  - Track cycling
- Equestrian
- Fencing
- Football
- Futsal
- Golf
- Gymnastics
  - Artistic gymnastics
  - Rhythmic gymnastics
  - Trampoline
- Handball
- Judo
- Karate
- Racquetball
- Roller sports
- Rowing
- Rugby sevens
- Sailing
- Shooting
- Softball
- Squash
- Table tennis
- Taekwondo
- Tennis
- Triathlon
- Volleyball
  - Beach volleyball
  - Volleyball
- Water skiing
- Weightlifting
- Wrestling

== Medal table ==
Final medal tally:

* Host nation (Colombia)

Rank	Nation	Gold	Silver	Bronze	Total
1	Colombia (COL)*	213	136	111	460
2	Venezuela (VEN)	94	95	103	292
3	Chile (CHI)	43	40	71	154
4	Ecuador (ECU)	32	73	88	193
5	Peru (PER)	32	53	69	154
6	Guatemala (GUA)	20	22	30	72
7	Dominican Republic (DOM)	18	16	34	68
8	Paraguay (PAR)	7	10	13	30
9	Bolivia (BOL)	5	10	17	32
10	El Salvador (ESA)	3	6	6	15
11	Panama (PAN)	2	7	19	28
Totals (11 entries)		469	468	561	1,498

== Medalists ==
=== Archery ===
Recurve

Event	Gold	Silver	Bronze
Men's ranking round	Ricardo Soto; Chile	Thomas Flossbach; Guatemala	Andrés Pila; Colombia
Men's Olympic round	Ricardo Soto; Chile	Diego Castro; Guatemala	Thomas Flossbach; Guatemala
Women's ranking round	Ana Rendón; Colombia	Natalia Sánchez; Colombia	Maira Sepúlveda; Colombia
Women's Olympic round	Maira Sepúlveda; Colombia	Ana Rendón; Colombia	Mayra Mendez; Venezuela
Men's team	Colombia; Andrés Pila; Daniel Pineda; Estiven Ramirez	Chile; Andrés Aguilar; Guillermo Aguilar; Ricardo Soto	Guatemala; Diego Castro; Thomas Flossbach; Kevin Lopez
Women's team	Colombia; Ana Rendón; Natalia Sánchez; Maira Sepúlveda	Chile; Javiera Andrades; Florencia González; Tania Maldonado	Venezuela; Nieves Arango; Mayra Mendez; Verona Villegas
Mixed team	Colombia; Andrés Pila; Ana Rendón	Guatemala; Thomas Flossbach; Esmeralda Valencia	Chile; Javiera Andrades; Ricardo Soto

Compound

Event	Gold	Silver	Bronze
Men's ranking round	Camilo Cardona; Colombia	Miguel Veliz; El Salvador	Alejandro Martín; Chile
Men's Olympic round	Camilo Cardona; Colombia	Daniel Muñoz; Colombia	Eduardo Gonzalez; Venezuela
Women's ranking round	Sara López; Colombia	Alejandra Usquiano; Colombia	Nora Valdez; Colombia
Women's Olympic round	Sara López; Colombia	Alejandra Usquiano; Colombia	Ana Mendoza; Venezuela
Men's team	Colombia; Sebastián Arenas; Camilo Cardona; Daniel Muñoz	Guatemala; José Marcelo del Cid; Rodrigo del Cid; Pedro Salazar	El Salvador; Roberto Hernández; Douglas Nolasco; Miguel Veliz
Women's team	Colombia; Sara López; Alejandra Usquiano; Nora Valdez	Venezuela; Olga Bosch; Luzmary Guedez; Ana Mendoza	Guatemala; Sofia Leal; Sofia Paiz; Maria José Zebadua
Mixed team	Colombia; Camilo Cardona; Sara López	Guatemala; José Marcelo del Cid; Maria José Zebadua	Venezuela; Maico Gomez; Ana Mendoza

=== Badminton ===
Event	Gold	Silver	Bronze
Men's singles	Rodolfo Ramírez; Guatemala	Daniel la Torre; Peru	Cristián Araya; Chile
Men's singles	Rodolfo Ramírez; Guatemala	Daniel la Torre; Peru	José Guevara; Peru
Women's singles	Daniela Macías; Peru	Nikté Sotomayor; Guatemala	Diana Corleto; Guatemala
Women's singles	Daniela Macías; Peru	Nikté Sotomayor; Guatemala	Paula la Torre; Peru
Men's doubles	Guatemala; Jonathan Solís; Rodolfo Ramírez	Peru; Diego Mini; Mario Cuba	Dominican Republic; Nelson Javier; William Cabrera
Men's doubles	Guatemala; Jonathan Solís; Rodolfo Ramírez	Peru; Diego Mini; Mario Cuba	Dominican Republic; César Brito; Reimi Cabrera
Women's doubles	Peru; Dánica Nishimura; Daniela Macías	Dominican Republic; Licelott Sánchez; Nairoby Jiménez	Venezuela; Damaris Ortiz; Michelle Martínez
Women's doubles	Peru; Dánica Nishimura; Daniela Macías	Dominican Republic; Licelott Sánchez; Nairoby Jiménez	Peru; Inés Castillo; Paula la Torre
Mixed doubles	Peru; Daniela Macías; Mario Cuba	Guatemala; Mariana Paiz; Aníbal Marroquín	Guatemala; Nikté Sotomayor; Jonathan Solís
Mixed doubles	Peru; Daniela Macías; Mario Cuba	Guatemala; Mariana Paiz; Aníbal Marroquín	Peru; Dánica Nishimura; Daniel la Torre
Mixed team	Guatemala; Alejandra Paiz; Nikté Sotomayor; Kevin Cordón; Rodolfo Ramírez; Jonathan Solís; Mariana Paiz; Diana Corleto; Aníbal Marroquín	Peru; Dánica Nishimura; Daniel la Torre; Daniela Macías; Diego Mini; Inés Castillo; José Guevara; Mario Cuba; Paula la Torre	Dominican Republic; Licelott Sánchez; Bermary Polanco; César Brito; Noemi Almonte; Nairoby Jiménez; Nelson Javier; Reimi Cabrera; William Cabrera

=== Baseball ===
Event	Gold	Silver	Bronze
Men	Colombia; Adrian Sanchez; Álvaro Noriega; Angel Vilchez; Charlie Mirabal; Dilson Herrera; Diover Avila; Efrain Contreras; Héctor Acuña; Jackson Solarte; John Romero; Jorge Alfaro; Juan Escorcia; Juan Corpas; Karl Triana; Kendy Batista; Kevin Escorcia; Manuel Boscan; Milton Ramos; Randy Consuegra; Ronald Ramirez; Sneider Batista; Tito Polo	Panama; Abdiel Velasquez; Abraham Atencio Caballero; Adolfo Reina; Alberto Acosta; Andy Otero; Belarmino Campos; Carlos Sanchez; Davis Romero; Edgar Muños; Eduardo Thomas; Gabriel Ramos; Gerald Chin; Javier Dominguez; Jean Corpas; Jhadiel Santamaria; Jonathan Saavedra; Jorge Bishop; Juan Madrigal; Luis Castillo; Manuel Campos; Rigoberto Catuy; Saul Gonzalez	Venezuela; Alberto Odreman; Angel Vargas; Carlos Parra; Danny Gutierrez; Derwin Pinto; Douglas Landaeta; Edgar Bruzual; Erasmo Tortolero; Frank Mata; Jesus Mogollon; Jesus Ugueto; Jhonny Merdano; Jhorge Liccien; Jonathan Sivira; Josmar Carreño; Juan Colmenarez; Leovildo Pargas; Luis Sanz; Pedro Guerra; Robert Palencia; Rusbel Fariñez; Wilce Nieves

=== Basketball ===
Event	Gold	Silver	Bronze
Men under-19	Colombia; Andres Ochoa; Brayan Duvan Vargas; Hector Martinez; Juan Pablo Cardona; Juan Armenteros; Luis Valencia; Maiknor Reid; Octavio Muñoz; Santiago Pastrana; Sergio Lopez; Soren Deluque; Yimi Ballestero	Venezuela; Alvaro Rodriguez; Arian Amundaray; Carlos Lopez; Ernesto Hernandez; Gabriel Pino; Hector Medina; Heldrin Guillen; Jhonny Tovar; Johandryn Mendoza; Jonnathan Martinez; José Bracho; Luis Llamo	Peru; Cesar Campos; Cesar Vasquez; Cesar Villalobos; Derek Rivero; Diego Alache; Franco Duarte; Gonzalo Bernabe; Juan Pablo Venegas; Matias Quiros; Miro Ceccarelli; Roberto Carpio; Rodrigo Matos
Women	Colombia; Carolina Lopez; Diana Prens; Jennifer Muñoz; Libia de la Rosa; Luz Asprilla; Mabel Martinez; Manuela Rios; Maria Palacios; Marlyn Vente; Mayra Caicedo; Narlyn Mosquera; Yaneth Arias	Dominican Republic; Ana de los Angeles; Andreina Paniagua; Cheisy Hernandez; Esmery Martinez; Frabel Feliz; Genesis Evangelista; Giocelis Reynoso; Jennifer Estrella; Julady Zapata; Marian Soto; Nicole Guerrero; Sugeiry Monsac	Bolivia; Adriana Delgadillo; Esther Pacheco; Jhoselin de la Barra; Lucia Sejas; Maria Olguin; Maria Carmona; Mercela Viscarra; Mirian Justiniano; Nayeli Machicao; Romina Rodriguez

=== Bowling ===
Event	Gold	Silver	Bronze
Men's singles	Andrés Gómez; Colombia	Luis Rovaina; Venezuela	Santiago Mejía; Colombia
Men's doubles	Venezuela; Ildemaro Ruiz; Luis Rovaina	Colombia; Andrés Gómez; Manuel Otalora	Colombia; Óscar Rodríguez; Santiago Mejía
Men's trios	Venezuela; Ildemaro Ruiz; Luis Rovaina; Rogelio Felice	Colombia; Andrés Gómez; Manuel Otalora; Santiago Mejía	Dominican Republic; Francisco Prats; Wascar Cavallo; Willie Javier
Men's team	Colombia; Andrés Gómez; Manuel Otalora; Santiago Mejía; Óscar Rodríguez	Venezuela; Massimiliano Fridegotto; Ildemaro Ruiz; Luis Rovaina; Rogelio Felice	Dominican Republic; Fidel Marchenas; Francisco Prats; Wascar Cavallo; Willie Javier
Men's all-events	Fidel Marchenas; Dominican Republic	Donald Augusto Lee; Panama	Manuel Otalora; Colombia
Men's masters	Andrés Gómez; Colombia	Donald Augusto Lee; Panama	Ildemaro Ruiz; Venezuela
Men's masters	Andrés Gómez; Colombia	Donald Augusto Lee; Panama	Fidel Marchenas; Dominican Republic
Women's singles	Juliana Franco; Colombia	Rocio Restrepo; Colombia	María Rodríguez; Colombia
Women's doubles	Venezuela; Alicia Marcano; Karen Marcano	Colombia; Clara Guerrero; Rocio Restrepo	Colombia; Juliana Franco; María Rodríguez
Women's trios	Venezuela; Alicia Marcano; Karen Marcano; Patricia de Faria	Colombia; Clara Guerrero; Juliana Franco; Rocio Restrepo	Dominican Republic; Aura Guerra; Virginia Bello; Maria Paula Vilas
Women's team	Colombia; Clara Guerrero; Juliana Franco; Rocio Restrepo; María Rodríguez	Dominican Republic; Astrid Valiente; Aura Guerra; Virginia Bello; Maria Paula Vilas	Venezuela; Ingellimar Contreras; Alicia Marcano; Karen Marcano; Patricia de Faria
Women's all-events	Rocio Restrepo; Colombia	Juliana Franco; Colombia	María Rodríguez; Colombia
Women's masters	Clara Guerrero; Colombia	María Rodríguez; Colombia	Patricia de Faria; Venezuela
Women's masters	Clara Guerrero; Colombia	María Rodríguez; Colombia	Astrid Valiente; Dominican Republic
Mixed doubles	Dominican Republic; Astrid Valiente; Fidel Marchenas	El Salvador; Eugenia Quintanilla; Luis Bendeck	Colombia; María Rodríguez; Óscar Rodríguez

=== Boxing ===
Event	Gold	Silver	Bronze
Men's 49 kg	Yuberjen Martínez; Colombia	Isaac Herrera; Peru	Jesús Rojas; Venezuela
Men's 49 kg	Yuberjen Martínez; Colombia	Isaac Herrera; Peru	Brian Fernández; Bolivia
Men's 52 kg	Ceiber Ávila; Colombia	Jean Caicedo; Ecuador	Diego Tananta; Peru
Men's 52 kg	Ceiber Ávila; Colombia	Jean Caicedo; Ecuador	Carlos Mujica; Venezuela
Men's 56 kg	Alexy de la Cruz; Dominican Republic	Yoel Finol; Venezuela	Jhon Martínez; Colombia
Men's 56 kg	Alexy de la Cruz; Dominican Republic	Yoel Finol; Venezuela	Leonel Gutierrez; Panama
Men's 60 kg	Leonel de los Santos; Dominican Republic	Jhonny Santacruz; Ecuador	Jonathan Miniel; Panama
Men's 60 kg	Leonel de los Santos; Dominican Republic	Jhonny Santacruz; Ecuador	Albeiro Paredes; Colombia
Men's 64 kg	Miguel Ferrin; Ecuador	John Gutierrez; Colombia	Charlie Wilson; Panama
Men's 64 kg	Miguel Ferrin; Ecuador	John Gutierrez; Colombia	Elvis Rodriguez; Dominican Republic
Men's 69 kg	Rohan Polanco; Dominican Republic	Gabriel Maestre; Venezuela	Eduardo Zuleta; Chile
Men's 69 kg	Rohan Polanco; Dominican Republic	Gabriel Maestre; Venezuela	Ricardo Legarda; Colombia
Men's 75 kg	Jorge Vivas; Colombia	Endry Saavedra; Venezuela	Joseph Cherkashyn; Chile
Men's 75 kg	Jorge Vivas; Colombia	Endry Saavedra; Venezuela	Raúl Sanchez; Dominican Republic
Men's 81 kg	Nalek Korbaj; Venezuela	Diego Motoa; Colombia	Christopher Zañartu; Chile
Men's 81 kg	Nalek Korbaj; Venezuela	Diego Motoa; Colombia	Luis Manuel Georges; Dominican Republic
Men's 91 kg	Deivi Julio; Colombia	Julio Castillo; Ecuador	Miguel Veliz; Chile
Men's 91 kg	Deivi Julio; Colombia	Julio Castillo; Ecuador	Albert Ramírez; Venezuela
Men's +91 kg	Cristian Salcedo; Colombia	Rayneri Vargas; Dominican Republic	Edgar Muñoz; Venezuela
Men's +91 kg	Cristian Salcedo; Colombia	Rayneri Vargas; Dominican Republic	Luis Muñoz; Peru
Women's 51 kg	Ingrit Valencia; Colombia	Fiorela Goicochea; Peru	Cristina Porozo; Ecuador
Women's 51 kg	Ingrit Valencia; Colombia	Fiorela Goicochea; Peru	Tayonys Cedeño; Venezuela
Women's 60 kg	Yeni Arias; Colombia	Omailyn Alcalá; Venezuela	Jessica Muñoz; Dominican Republic
Women's 60 kg	Yeni Arias; Colombia	Omailyn Alcalá; Venezuela	Elissa Williams; Panama
Women's 75 kg	Jessica Caicedo; Colombia	Erika Pachito; Venezuela	Atheyna Bylon; Panama
Women's 75 kg	Jessica Caicedo; Colombia	Erika Pachito; Venezuela	Evelyn Tolentino; Peru

=== Canoeing ===
Event	Gold	Silver	Bronze
Men's C1 1000 m	Ariel Jimenez; Dominican Republic	Yasser Guerra; Venezuela	Luis Palala; Guatemala
Men's C2 1000 m	Colombia; Daniel Pacheco; Sergio Díaz	Chile; Carlos Arevalo; Michael Garcia	Venezuela; José Miguel Solano; Ronny Rattia
Men's K1 200 m	César de Cesare; Ecuador	Miguel Valencia; Chile	Alexander Concepcion; Dominican Republic
Men's K1 1000 m	Edwin Amaya; Colombia	Cristian Guerrero; Dominican Republic	Edvin Buc; Guatemala
Men's K2 200 m	Ecuador; César de Cesare; Washington Becerra	Venezuela; Antonio Oropeza; Ray Acuña	Chile; Julian Cortez; Miguel Valencia
Men's K2 1000 m	Dominican Republic; Cristian Guerrero; Rafael Feliz	Colombia; Leocadio Pinto; Yojan Cano	Venezuela; Antonio Oropeza; Ray Acuña
Men's K4 500 m	Venezuela; Antonio Oropeza; Ray Acuña; Cristhian Canache; Joel Gonzalez	Colombia; Edwin Amaya; Leocadio Pinto; Luis García; Yojan Cano	Dominican Republic; Alexander Concepcion; Cristian Guerrero; Juan Plasencia; Rafael Feliz
Women's C1 200 m	Anggie Avegno; Ecuador	Clara Lopez; Guatemala	Nancy Millan; Chile
Women's C2 500 m	Chile; Karen Roco; María Mailliard	Ecuador; Anggie Avegno; María Ibarra	Colombia; Ana Ochoa; Katerine Moreno
Women's K1 200 m	Diexe Molina; Colombia	Stefanie Perdomo; Ecuador	Mara Guerrero; Venezuela
Women's K1 500 m	Tatiana Muñoz; Colombia	Ysumy Orellana; Chile	Stefanie Perdomo; Ecuador
Women's K2 200 m	Colombia; Diexe Molina; Tatiana Muñoz	Ecuador; Neida Angulo; Stefanie Perdomo	Venezuela; Angelica Jimenez; Mairovi Jaspe
Women's K2 500 m	Colombia; Diexe Molina; Tatiana Muñoz	Ecuador; Neida Angulo; Stefanie Perdomo	Chile; Fabiola Zamorano; Goviana Reyes
Women's K4 500 m	Colombia; Diexe Molina; Tatiana Muñoz; Ruth Niño; Karen Molina	Venezuela; Angelica Jimenez; Diana Ramos; Mairovi Jaspe; Mara Guerrero	not awarded

=== Diving ===
Event	Gold	Silver	Bronze
Men's 3 m springboard	Sebastián Morales; Colombia	Robert Páez; Venezuela	Sebastián Villa; Colombia
Men's 10 m platform	Víctor Ortega; Colombia	Kevin García; Colombia	Robert Páez; Venezuela
Men's synchronized 3 m springboard	Colombia; Sebastián Morales; Sebastián Villa	Venezuela; Oscar Ariza; Robert Páez	Dominican Republic; Frandiel Gomez; José Calderon
Men's synchronized 10 m platform	Venezuela; Oscar Ariza; Robert Páez	Colombia; Kevin García; Víctor Ortega	Ecuador; Isaac Alvarado; Walter Vera
Women's 3 m springboard	Diana Pineda; Colombia	Steffanie Madrigal; Colombia	shared silver
Women's 3 m springboard	Diana Pineda; Colombia	Elizabeth Perez; Venezuela	shared silver
Women's 10 m platform	Carolina Murillo; Colombia	Maria Betancourt; Venezuela	Lisette Ramirez; Venezuela
Women's synchronized 3 m springboard	Colombia; Diana Pineda; Steffanie Madrigal	Ecuador; Madeleine Rivadeneira; Rommy Santillan	Chile; Catalina Aros; Marieli Urriola
Women's synchronized 10 m platform	Colombia; Carolina Murillo; Daniela Zapata	Venezuela; Lisette Ramirez; Maria Betancourt	Ecuador; Madeleine Rivadeneira; Rommy Santillan

=== Equestrian ===
Event	Gold	Silver	Bronze
Individual dressage	Ecuador; Julio Mendoza on Chardonnay	Ecuador; Maria Jose Granja on Emiliano AP	Colombia; Sergio Muñoz on Dark Dancer
Individual dressage – overall	Ecuador; Julio Mendoza on Chardonnay	Colombia; Sergio Muñoz on Dark Dancer	Colombia; Santiago Cardona on Espartaco
Team dressage	Ecuador; Julio Mendoza on Chardonnay; Maria Jose Granja on Emiliano AP; Carolina Espinosa on Pegazo; Franziska Klinkicht on Roelof van Wolfshol	Colombia; Sergio Muñoz on Dark Dancer; Santiago Cardona on Espartaco; Brunella Tascon on Le Petit Prince R Diego Perez on Casanova	Peru; Monika von Wedemeyer on Senza Dubio; Margoth Batievsky on Fox Sea; Juan Bautista Ledgard on Accent
Individual jumping	Colombia; Eduardo Nieto on Parlanti	Colombia; Juan Pablo Betancourt on Grand Slam	Venezuela; Emanuel Andrade on Reus de la Nutria
Individual jumping – speed test	Ecuador; Diego Vivero on Bijoux	Venezuela; Emanuel Andrade on Reus de la Nutria	Colombia; Ruben Arroyave on Castanuela
Individual jumping – overall	Colombia; Juan Pablo Betancourt on Grand Slam	Venezuela; Emanuel Andrade on Reus de la Nutria	Colombia; Ruben Arroyave on Castanuela
Team jumping	Colombia; Ruben Arroyave on Castanuela; Santiago Medina on Concorde; Juan Pablo Betancourt on Grand Slam; Eduardo Nieto on Parlanti	Ecuador; Diego Vivero on Bijoux; Pablo Andrade on Clight; Luis Barreiro on Grand Corona d Heyboght; Nicole Neidl on Only Love	Venezuela; Emanuel Andrade on Reus de la Nutria; Luis Larrazabal on G and C Close Up; Eduardo Cariello on Qualif d'Askel; Vicente Guillin on Absolut

=== Fencing ===
Men

Event	Gold	Silver	Bronze
Individual foil	Antonio Leal; Venezuela	Rubén Silva; Chile	Johan Mora; Venezuela
Individual foil	Antonio Leal; Venezuela	Rubén Silva; Chile	Dimitri Clairet; Colombia
Team foil	Chile; Felipe Alvear; Gustavo Alarcón; Rubén Silva	Colombia; Alejandro Hernandez; Daniel Sconzo; Dimitri Clairet; Santiago Pachon	Venezuela; Antonio Leal; Cesar Aguirre; Johan Manuel Mora; Victor Leon
Individual épée	Jhon Édison Rodríguez; Colombia	Francisco Limardo; Venezuela	Rolf Nickel; Chile
Individual épée	Jhon Édison Rodríguez; Colombia	Francisco Limardo; Venezuela	Gustavo Coqueco; Colombia
Team épée	Venezuela; Francisco Limardo; Gabriel Lugo; Jesús Limardo; Rubén Limardo	Colombia; Andres Campos; Gustavo Coqueco; Jhon Édison Rodríguez; Jhon Gonzalez	Chile; Pablo Nuñez; Rodrigo Gonzalez; Rolf Nickel
Individual sabre	Sebastián Cuellar; Colombia	Eliecer Romero; Venezuela	José Quintero; Venezuela
Individual sabre	Sebastián Cuellar; Colombia	Eliecer Romero; Venezuela	Luis Correa; Colombia
Team sabre	Venezuela; Abraham Rodriguez; Eliecer Romero; Jesus Carvajal; José Quintero	Colombia; Luis Correa; Pablo Trochez; Sebastián Cuellar; Wilber Restrepo	Chile; Manuel Bahamonde; Ricardo Alvarez; Victor Contreras

Women

Event	Gold	Silver	Bronze
Individual foil	Saskia van Erven; Colombia	Isis Giménez; Venezuela	Arantza Inostroza; Chile
Individual foil	Saskia van Erven; Colombia	Isis Giménez; Venezuela	Johana Fuenmayor; Venezuela
Team foil	Colombia; Juliana Pineda; Juliana Velasquez; Laura Guerra; Saskia van Erven	Venezuela; Hillary Avelleira; Isis Giménez; Liz Rivero; Johana Fuenmayor	Chile; Arantza Inostroza; Bárbara Ahumada; Rudy Lepe
Individual épée	María Martínez; Venezuela	Eliana Lugo; Venezuela	Alessandra Aicardi; Panama
Individual épée	María Martínez; Venezuela	Eliana Lugo; Venezuela	Saskia van Erven; Colombia
Team épée	Venezuela; Eliana Lugo; Lizze Asis; María Martínez; Patrizia Piovesan	Chile; Analia Fernandez; Arantza Inostroza; Rudy Lepe	Colombia; Laura Castillo; Natalia Lozano; Saskia van Erven; Victoria Ramos
Individual sabre	Milagros Pastrán; Venezuela	Jessica Morales; Colombia	Linda Gonzáles; Colombia
Individual sabre	Milagros Pastrán; Venezuela	Jessica Morales; Colombia	Shía Rodríguez; Venezuela
Team sabre	Colombia; Evelyn Vega; Jessica Morales; Linda Gonzáles; Linda Klimavicius	Venezuela; Milagros Pastrán; Nulexis Gonzalez; Patricia Contreras; Shía Rodríguez	Bolivia; Alicia Cortes; Ana Ramos; Sofia Vargas

=== Football ===
Event	Gold	Silver	Bronze
Men under-17	Colombia; Andrés Balanta; Andrés Perea; Christian Andrade; Daniel José Melo; Déiber Caicedo; Deyman Cortés; Etilso Martínez; Fabián Ángel; Guillermo Tegue; Gustavo Carvajal; Leandro Campaz; Juan Vidal; Juan Peñaloza; Kevin Mier; Luis López; Robert Mejía; Thomas Gutiérrez; Yadir Meneses	Ecuador; César Parra; Danny Villigua; Fricson Lastra; Gerly Delgado; Gonzalo Plata; Iván Betancourt; Jackson Porozo; Jhon Campos; Joffre Monroy; Jordan Rezabala; Joseph Espinoza; Julio Cárdenas; Kevin Sambonino; Luis Ortiz; Samuel Perlaza; Santiago Micolta; Wellington Moisés Ramírez; Yarol Tafur	Venezuela; Adrián Zambrano; Brayan Palmezano; Carlos Olses; Christian Makoun; Cristian Cásseres Jr. Diego Luna; Eduardo Fereira; Esli García; Johan Montes; Jorge Echeverría; Jorge Yriarte; José Barragán; José Reyes; Junior Alberto Moreno; Junior Paredes; Manuel Godoy; Marco Andrés Gómez; Miguel Silva
Women under-20	Colombia; Ana Fisgativa; Angie Castañeda; Daniela Caracas; Geraldyne Saavedra; Laura Barreto; Maireth Pérez; Manuela Vanegas; Michel Lugo; Nancy Acosta; Natalia Acuña; Sara Paez; Sara Pulecio; Sara Cordoba; Sharon Ramírez; Valentina Restrepo; Valentina Vivas; Yorelyne Carabali; Yulieth Rivas	Ecuador; Alisson Fierro; Andrea Ochoa; Andrea Moran; Britney Guadamud; Diana Ganan; Domenica Rodriguez; Gabriela Malave; Joselyn Espinales; Justine Cuadra; Karen Flores; Luisa Espinoza; Manoly Baquerizo; Maylin Arreaga; Michelle Clarkin; Nayeli Bolaños; Samanta Aviles; Tamara Angulo	Venezuela; Alexa Castro; Claudia Quintero; Daniuska Rodríguez; Francy Rodriguez; Frankelly Carpio; Genesis Florez; Gerardine Olivo; Hilaris Villasana; Hilary Vergara; Jeismar Cabeza; Nathalie Pasquel; Nayluisa Caceres; Olimar Castillo; Rosa Briceño; Sandra Luzardo; Yailyn Medina; Yerliane Moreno; Yulieska Suarez

=== Futsal ===
Event	Gold	Silver	Bronze
Men	Colombia; Jorge Abril; Yonathan Cardenas; Angellott Caro; Jorge Cuervo; Felipe Echavarria; Jhonatan Giraldo; Camilo Gomez; José Gutierrez; Richard Gutierrez; Andres Reyes; José Sanchez; Mateo Zapata	Ecuador; Kevin Borja; Bolivar Caicedo; Jimmy Espinales; Jordan Mercado; Dario Meza; Erick Miranda; Jerson Nazareno; Patricio Pilaguano; Carlos Simisterra; Javier Villacis; Haminton Villareal	Peru; Jorge Aguilar; Angel Angulo; Hugo Barrantes; Juan Manuel Castro; Jesús Herrera; Martín Herrera; Sebastián Obando; Jorge Pacheco; Jairo Tasayco; Xavier Tavera; Julio Tizón; Junior Ulloa

=== Golf ===
Event	Gold	Silver	Bronze
Men's individual	Daniel Zuluaga; Colombia	Joaquín Niemann; Chile	Jesús Amaya; Colombia
Women's individual	Paola Moreno; Colombia	Daniela Darquea; Ecuador	Mariajo Uribe; Colombia
Mixed team	Colombia; Daniel Zuluaga; Jesús Amaya; Mariajo Uribe; Paola Moreno	Ecuador; Daniela Darquea; José Miranda; Kitty Hwang Choi; Rafael Miranda	Panama; Laura Restrepo; Michael Norman; Raul Carbonel

=== Judo ===
Event	Gold	Silver	Bronze
Men's 60 kg	Lenin Preciado; Ecuador	John Futtinico; Colombia	Elmert Ramírez; Dominican Republic
Men's 60 kg	Lenin Preciado; Ecuador	John Futtinico; Colombia	Dilmer Calle; Peru
Men's 66 kg	Juan Postigos; Peru	Juan Pérez; Chile	Ricardo Valderrama; Venezuela
Men's 66 kg	Juan Postigos; Peru	Juan Pérez; Chile	Ronal González; Panama
Men's 73 kg	Alonso Wong; Peru	Sergio Mattey; Venezuela	Erick Ayabaca; Ecuador
Men's 73 kg	Alonso Wong; Peru	Sergio Mattey; Venezuela	Leider Navarro; Colombia
Men's 81 kg	Noel Peña; Venezuela	Alexander Borja; Colombia	Edison Vivero; Ecuador
Men's 81 kg	Noel Peña; Venezuela	Alexander Borja; Colombia	Luis Angeles; Peru
Men's 90 kg	Juan Diego Turcios; El Salvador	Rafael Romo Jelves; Chile	Francisco Balanta; Colombia
Men's 90 kg	Juan Diego Turcios; El Salvador	Rafael Romo Jelves; Chile	José Ortega; Panama
Men's 100 kg	Thomas Briceño; Chile	Antony Peña; Venezuela	Alejandro Escobar; Colombia
Men's 100 kg	Thomas Briceño; Chile	Antony Peña; Venezuela	Frank Alvarado; Peru
Men's +100 kg	Pedro Pineda; Venezuela	Freddy Figueroa; Ecuador	Francisco Solis; Chile
Men's +100 kg	Pedro Pineda; Venezuela	Freddy Figueroa; Ecuador	José Acosta; Dominican Republic
Men's team	Colombia; Francisco Balanta; Alexander Borja; Alejandro Escobar; John Futtinico; Jorge González; William Melendez; Leider Navarro; Jhonathan Paniagua	Venezuela; Eldris Aguiar; Hector Alvarado; Sergio Mattey; Noel Peña; Antony Peña; Pedro Pineda; Hector Reyes; Ricardo Valderrama	Peru; Frank Alvarado; Luis Angeles; José Luis Arroyo; Dilmer Calle; Jesus Gavidia; Juan Postigos; Alexander Ramirez; Alonso Wong
Men's team	Colombia; Francisco Balanta; Alexander Borja; Alejandro Escobar; John Futtinico; Jorge González; William Melendez; Leider Navarro; Jhonathan Paniagua	Venezuela; Eldris Aguiar; Hector Alvarado; Sergio Mattey; Noel Peña; Antony Peña; Pedro Pineda; Hector Reyes; Ricardo Valderrama	Ecuador; Erick Ayabaca; Freddy Figueroa; José Eduardo Merlin; Edison Mogollon; Lenin Preciado; Michael Quiroz; Edison Vivero
Women's 44 kg	Erika Lasso; Colombia	Milagros Gonzalez; Venezuela	Pamela Quizhpi; Ecuador
Women's 48 kg	Luz Álvarez; Colombia	Lesly Cano; Peru	Mary Dee Vargas; Chile
Women's 48 kg	Luz Álvarez; Colombia	Lesly Cano; Peru	Marlyn Castillo; Venezuela
Women's 52 kg	Thalia Gamarra; Peru	Diana Sabino; Dominican Republic	Yormarlyn Romero; Venezuela
Women's 52 kg	Thalia Gamarra; Peru	Diana Sabino; Dominican Republic	Kristine Jimenez; Panama
Women's 57 kg	Gisela Garcia; Venezuela	Ana Smelyn Rosa; Dominican Republic	Diana Villavicencio; Ecuador
Women's 57 kg	Gisela Garcia; Venezuela	Ana Smelyn Rosa; Dominican Republic	Anna Tirado; Panama
Women's 63 kg	Anriquelis Barrios; Venezuela	Estefania García; Ecuador	Karina Orellana; Chile
Women's 63 kg	Anriquelis Barrios; Venezuela	Estefania García; Ecuador	Cindy Mera; Colombia
Women's 70 kg	Yuri Alvear; Colombia	Zulnida Chavez; Venezuela	Camila Figueroa; Peru
Women's 78 kg	Elvismar Rodríguez; Venezuela	Diana Velasco; Colombia	Vanessa Chalá; Ecuador
Women's +78 kg	Karen León; Venezuela	Andrea Zapata; Colombia	not awarded
Women's team	Colombia; Luz Álvarez; Yuri Alvear; Erika Lasso; Tatiana Lucumi; Cindy Mera; Nathalia Pérez; Diana Velasco; Andrea Zapata	Venezuela; Anriquelis Barrios; Marlyn Castillo; Zunilda Chavez; Gisela Garcia; Milagros Gonzalez; Karen León; Elvismar Rodríguez; Yormarlyn Romero	Dominican Republic; Lorena de Jesus; Katherine Otaño; Ana Smelyn Rosa; Diana Sabino
Women's team	Colombia; Luz Álvarez; Yuri Alvear; Erika Lasso; Tatiana Lucumi; Cindy Mera; Nathalia Pérez; Diana Velasco; Andrea Zapata	Venezuela; Anriquelis Barrios; Marlyn Castillo; Zunilda Chavez; Gisela Garcia; Milagros Gonzalez; Karen León; Elvismar Rodríguez; Yormarlyn Romero	Ecuador; Yelena Arreaga; Vanessa Chalá; Estefania García; Pamela Quizhpi; Diana Villavicencio; Marlin Viveros

=== Karate ===
Event	Gold	Silver	Bronze
Men's individual kata	Antonio Díaz; Venezuela	Mariano Wong; Peru	Alejandro Maldonado; Bolivia
Men's individual kata	Antonio Díaz; Venezuela	Mariano Wong; Peru	Hector Cencion; Panama
Women's individual kata	María Dimitrova; Dominican Republic	Ingrid Aranda; Peru	Cristina Orbe; Ecuador
Women's individual kata	María Dimitrova; Dominican Republic	Ingrid Aranda; Peru	Rosangela Gonzalez; Venezuela
Men's kumite 60 kg	Jovanni Martinez; Venezuela	Alfredo Jurado; El Salvador	Luis de Leon; Guatemala
Men's kumite 60 kg	Jovanni Martinez; Venezuela	Alfredo Jurado; El Salvador	Andrés Rendón; Colombia
Men's kumite 67 kg	Daniel Viveros; Ecuador	Luis Solares; Guatemala	Luis Triviño; Colombia
Men's kumite 67 kg	Daniel Viveros; Ecuador	Luis Solares; Guatemala	Miguel Andujar; Dominican Republic
Men's kumite 75 kg	Allan Maldonado; Guatemala	German Charpentier; Chile	Esteban Espinoza; Ecuador
Men's kumite 75 kg	Allan Maldonado; Guatemala	German Charpentier; Chile	Juan Landázuri; Colombia
Men's kumite 84 kg	Freddy Valera; Venezuela	Carlos Sinisterra; Colombia	Jorge Acevedo; Chile
Men's kumite 84 kg	Freddy Valera; Venezuela	Carlos Sinisterra; Colombia	Mohamed Yusuf Dames; Bolivia
Men's kumite +84 kg	Franklin Mina; Ecuador	Herick Granado; Venezuela	Alejandro Abdalla; Guatemala
Men's kumite +84 kg	Franklin Mina; Ecuador	Herick Granado; Venezuela	Anel Castillo; Dominican Republic
Men's team kumite	Colombia; Andrés Rendón; Carlos Sinisterra; Diego Lenis; Juan Landázuri; Luis Triviño	Chile; Camilo Velozo; German Charpentier; Jorge Acevedo; Miguel Soffia; Rodrigo Rojas	Guatemala; Alejandro Abdalla; Allan Maldonado; Brandon Ramirez; Luis de Leon; Luis Solares
Men's team kumite	Colombia; Andrés Rendón; Carlos Sinisterra; Diego Lenis; Juan Landázuri; Luis Triviño	Chile; Camilo Velozo; German Charpentier; Jorge Acevedo; Miguel Soffia; Rodrigo Rojas	Ecuador; Daniel Viveros; Esteban Espinoza; Franklin Mina; Kevin Pazmiño; Li Duang Diaz
Women's kumite 50 kg	Aurimer Campos; Venezuela	Paula Ruiz; Colombia	Gabriela Bruna; Chile
Women's kumite 50 kg	Aurimer Campos; Venezuela	Paula Ruiz; Colombia	Merly Huamani; Peru
Women's kumite 55 kg	Stella Urango; Colombia	Bárbara Pérez; Venezuela	Katty Llerena; Ecuador
Women's kumite 55 kg	Stella Urango; Colombia	Bárbara Pérez; Venezuela	Maria Vindrola; Peru
Women's kumite 61 kg	Carolina Videla; Chile	Alexandra Grande; Peru	Oriana Rodríguez; Venezuela
Women's kumite 61 kg	Carolina Videla; Chile	Alexandra Grande; Peru	Stefanny Medina; Colombia
Women's kumite 68 kg	Marianth Cuervo; Venezuela	Milagros Alfaro; Peru	Priscilla Lazo; Ecuador
Women's kumite 68 kg	Marianth Cuervo; Venezuela	Milagros Alfaro; Peru	Karina Perez; Dominican Republic
Women's kumite +68 kg	Valeria Echever; Ecuador	Pamela Rodríguez; Dominican Republic	Shanee Torres; Colombia
Women's kumite +68 kg	Valeria Echever; Ecuador	Pamela Rodríguez; Dominican Republic	Isabel Aco; Peru
Women's team kumite	Ecuador; Jacqueline Factos; Katty Llerena; Lady García; Priscilla Lazo; Valeria Echever	Venezuela; Aurimer Campos; Bárbara Pérez; Marianth Cuervo; Milagros Barreto; Oriana Rodríguez	Peru; Alexandra Grande; Isabel Aco; Maria Vindrola; Merly Huamani; Milagros Alfaro
Women's team kumite	Ecuador; Jacqueline Factos; Katty Llerena; Lady García; Priscilla Lazo; Valeria Echever	Venezuela; Aurimer Campos; Bárbara Pérez; Marianth Cuervo; Milagros Barreto; Oriana Rodríguez	Colombia; Laura Florez; Paula Ruiz; Shanee Torres; Stefanny Medina; Stella Urango

=== Roller sports ===
Artistic skating

Event	Gold	Silver	Bronze
Men's free	José Luis Díaz; Chile	Víctor López; Paraguay	Jairo Ortiz; Colombia
Women's free	Nataly Otalora; Colombia	María Eduarda Fuentes; Ecuador	Francisca Cabrera; Chile
Women's dance	Viviana Osorio; Colombia	Betina Díaz; Paraguay	Camila Soto; Chile

Speed skating

Event	Gold	Silver	Bronze
Men's 300 m CRI	Andrés Muñoz; Colombia	Emanuelle Silva; Chile	Lucas Silva; Chile
Men's 500 m sprint	Edwin Estrada; Colombia	Andrés Muñoz; Colombia	Emanuelle Silva; Chile
Men's 1000 m	Andrés Muñoz; Colombia	Jhoan Guzmán; Venezuela	Jorge Bolaños; Ecuador
Men's 10000 m points + elimination	Jorge Bolaños; Ecuador	Raúl Pedraza; Chile	Alex Cujavante; Colombia
Men's 100 m track	Edwin Estrada; Colombia	Andrés Muñoz; Colombia	Luis Delgado; Venezuela
Men's half marathon	Alex Cujavante; Colombia	Renato Campana; Ecuador	Julio Mirena; Venezuela
Women's 300 m CRI	Andrea Cañón; Colombia	Kerstinck Sarmiento; Colombia	Javiera Vargas; Chile
Women's 500 m sprint	Kerstinck Sarmiento; Colombia	Andrea Cañón; Colombia	Solymar Vivas; Venezuela
Women's 1000 m	Luz Garzón; Colombia	Fabriana Arias; Colombia	Alejandra Traslaviña; Chile
Women's 10000 m points + elimination	Fabriana Arias; Colombia	Luz Garzón; Colombia	Alejandra Traslaviña; Chile
Women's 100 m track	Andrea Cañón; Colombia	Javiera Vargas; Chile	Kerstinck Sarmiento; Colombia
Women's half marathon	Fabriana Arias; Colombia	Luz Garzón; Colombia	Alejandra Traslaviña; Chile

=== Rowing ===
Men

Event	Gold	Silver	Bronze
Single sculls	Arturo Rivarola; Paraguay	Jakson Vicent Monasterio; Venezuela	Roberto Lopez; El Salvador
Lightweight single sculls	Felipe Cárdenas; Chile	Renzo León García; Peru	José Güipe; Venezuela
Doubles sculls	Chile; Ignacio Abraham; Óscar Vásquez	Venezuela; Ali Leiva; Jakson Vicent Monasterio	Peru; Alvaro Torres; Eduardo Linares
Lightweight double sculls	Chile; César Abaroa; Eber Sanhueza	Venezuela; José Güipe; Luis Ollarves	Ecuador; Bryan Sola Zambrano; Cristhian Sola Zambrano
Quadruple sculls	Peru; Alvaro Torres; Angel Sosa; Eduardo Linares; Gonzalo del Solar	Chile; Bernardo Guerrero; Felipe Cárdenas; Ignacio Abraham; Óscar Vásquez	Venezuela; Agustin Betancourt; Ali Leiva; César Amaris; Jakson Vicent Monasterio
Lightweight quadruple sculls	Venezuela; Agustin Betancourt; César Amaris; José Güipe; Luis Ollarves	Chile; César Abaroa; Eber Sanhueza; Felipe Cárdenas; Marcelo Medina	Peru; Gianfranco Colmenares; Johann Hamann; Renzo León García; Renzo Brigneti

Women

Event	Gold	Silver	Bronze
Single sculls	Antonia Abraham; Chile	Alejandra Alonso; Paraguay	Wendy Simo; Dominican Republic
Lightweight single sculls	Melita Abraham; Chile	Gabriela Mosqueira; Paraguay	Camila Valle; Peru
Doubles sculls	Chile; Antonia Abraham; Melita Abraham	Venezuela; Jenesis Perez; Roxieri Guerra	Paraguay; Alejandra Alonso; Mariagnes Valdez
Lightweight double sculls	Chile; Isidora Niemeyer; Josefa Vila	Venezuela; Jenesis Perez; Roxieri Guerra	Peru; Camila Valle; Pamela Noya
Quadruple sculls	Chile; Antonia Abraham; Melita Abraham; Victoria Hostetter; Yoselin Carcamo	Peru; Alexandra Castro; Arantza Valera; Pamela Noya; Shantall Zegarra	Paraguay; Alejandra Alonso; Gabriela Mosqueira; Gisele Barrail; Mariagnes Valdez
Lightweight quadruple sculls	Chile; Isidora Niemeyer; Josefa Vila; Melita Abraham; Yoselin Carcamo	Peru; Camila Valle; María José Brigneti; Pamela Noya; Shantall Zegarra	Colombia; Laura Anacona; Mónica Jiménez; Valentina Martinez; Zulay Gil

=== Rugby sevens ===
Event	Gold	Silver	Bronze
Men	Chile; Julio Blanc; Felipe Brangier; Rodrigo Fernández; Nicolas Garafulic; Francisco Metuaze; Ignacio Silva; Marcelo Torrealba; Francisco Urroz; Martin Verschae; Pedro Verschae; Benjamin de Vidts; Lucas Westcott	Paraguay; Horacio Aguero; Lucas Aguilar; Sergio Alvarenga; Diego Argaña; Hector Gallosos; Juan Gonzalez; Ignacio Murdoch; Gaston Navas; Camilo Orrego; Juan Martín Ortiz; Carlos Plate; Rodrigo da Rosa	Colombia; Andres Alvarez; Camilo Cadavid; Diver Ceballos; José Manuel Diosa; Neider Garcia; Sebastian Mejia; Jhojan Ortiz; José Ricardo Ramirez; Cristian Rodallegas; Jhon Arley Urrutia; Alejando Vanegas; Juan José Zapata
Women	Colombia; Nicole Acevedo; Sharon Acevedo; Daniela Alzate; Catalina Arango; Solangie Delgado; Sara Florez; Carmen Ibarra; Camila Lopera; Khaterinne Medina; Laura Mejia; Sara Montoya; Isabel Romero	Paraguay; Ingrid Alfonso; Cinthia Cristaldo; Paula Denis; Claudia Fernandez; Mariela Gamba; Natalia Justiniano; Mayra Mendez; Aracelli Nicolini; Liliana Ovelar; Giulietta Romero; Estela Servin; Lucero Viveros	Peru; Natalia Correa; Maria Dominguez; Michelle Flores; Raysa Gonzales; Lucy Granda; Andrea Masias; Beatriz Orcotoma; Allison Pereyra; Rosemary Quesada; Lieneke Ratto; Melissa Vargas; Karoline Vergara

=== Sailing ===
Event	Gold	Silver	Bronze
Men's Laser Standard	Stefano Peschiera; Peru	Matias Dyck; Ecuador	Clemente Seguel; Chile
Men's Sunfish	David Hernandez; Guatemala	Jean Paul de Trazegnies; Peru	Alonso Collantes; Peru
Men's RS:X	Daniel Flores; Venezuela	Santiago Grillo; Colombia	Eduardo Herman; Chile
Women's Laser Radial	Daniela Rivera; Venezuela	Paloma Schmidt; Peru	Isabella Maegli; Guatemala
Women's Sunfish	Adriana Barron; Peru	Daniela Rivera; Venezuela	Francesca Balta; Peru
Snipe	Colombia; Esteban Echavarria; Juan Esteban Restrepo	Chile; María Jesús Seguel; Matías Seguel	Guatemala; José Daniel Hernandez; Juan Carlos Canizalez

=== Shooting ===
Men

Event	Gold	Silver	Bronze
10 m air pistol	Manuel Sánchez; Chile	Rudolf Knijnenburg; Bolivia	Albino Jiménez; Guatemala
10 m air pistol team	Guatemala; José Castillo; Albino Jiménez; Wilmar Madrid	Venezuela; Edilio Centeno; Douglas Gomez; Angel Jaimes	Peru; Marko Carrillo; Rodolfo Leon-Ravinez; José Ullilen
25 m rapid fire pistol	Marvin Herrera; Guatemala	Marko Carrillo; Peru	Diego Cossio; Bolivia
25 m rapid fire pistol team	Guatemala; José Castillo; Romeo Cruz; Marvin Herrera	Bolivia; Diego Cossio; Victor García; Rudolf Knijnenburg	Peru; Marko Carrillo; Rodolfo Leon-Ravinez; José Ullilen
50 m free pistol	Marko Carrillo; Peru	Albino Jiménez; Guatemala	Yautung Cueva; Ecuador
50 m free pistol team	Guatemala; José Castillo; Albino Jiménez; Wilmar Madrid	Bolivia; José Arias; Victor García; Rudolf Knijnenburg	Peru; Marko Carrillo; Rodolfo Leon-Ravinez; José Ullilen
10 m air rifle	Gonzalo Moncada; Chile	José Valiente; Guatemala	Daniel Vizcarra; Peru
10 m air rifle team	Chile; Eusebio Calderon; Gonzalo Moncada; Anyelo Parada	Ecuador; Victor Arteaga; Milton Camacho; Jhon Hurtado	Guatemala; Kenny Matta; Octavio Sandoval; José Valiente
50 m rifle prone	Octavio Sandoval; Guatemala	Israel Gutierrez; El Salvador	Ivan Lopez; Colombia
50 m rifle prone team	Peru; Guido Farfan; Miguel Mejía; Daniel Vizcarra	Guatemala; Kenny Matta; Marlon Perez; Octavio Sandoval	Chile; Eusebio Calderon; Gonzalo Moncada; Anyelo Parada
50 m rifle 3 positions	Daniel Vizcarra; Peru	Octavio Sandoval; Guatemala	Pedro Velasco; Colombia
50 m rifle 3 positions team	Guatemala; Kenny Matta; Marlon Perez; Octavio Sandoval	Peru; Guido Farfan; Miguel Mejía; Daniel Vizcarra	El Salvador; Israel Gutierrez; Noe Preza; Oliser Zelaya
Skeet	Diego Duarte; Colombia	Nicolas Giha; Peru	Nicolás Pacheco; Peru
Skeet team	Chile; Jorge Atalah; Hector Flores; Matias Martinez	Peru; Nicolas Giha; Nicolás Pacheco; Khalid Qahhat	Guatemala; Joaquin Molina; Santiago Romero; Juan Schaeffer
Trap	Jean Pierre Brol; Guatemala	Asier Cilloniz; Peru	Danilo Caro; Colombia
Trap team	Colombia; Danilo Caro; Esteban Caro; Hernando Vega	Peru; Asier Cilloniz; Alberto di Laura; Alessandro de Souza Ferreira	Guatemala; Dany Brol; Jean Pierre Brol; Carlos Hernandez
Double trap	Fernando Brol; Guatemala	Nicolás Pacheco; Peru	Alessandro de Souza Ferreira; Peru
Double trap team	Peru; Asier Cilloniz; Nicolás Pacheco; Alessandro de Souza Ferreira	Guatemala; Fernando Brol; Hebert Brol; Pablo Duarte	Colombia; Javier Arevalo; Luis Reyna; Hernando Vega

Women

Event	Gold	Silver	Bronze
10 m air pistol	Lucía Menéndez; Guatemala	Lilian Castro; El Salvador	Kimberly Linares; Guatemala
10 m air pistol team	Guatemala; Delmi Cruz; Kimberly Linares; Lucía Menéndez	Ecuador; Lady Duran; Diana Durango; Andrea Pérez Peña	Venezuela; Ivon Bucott; Maria José Marrero; Maribel Pineda
25 m sport pistol	Diana Durango; Ecuador	Kimberly Linares; Guatemala	Maribel Pineda; Venezuela
25 m sport pistol team	Guatemala; Delmi Cruz; Kimberly Linares; Lucía Menéndez	Ecuador; Lady Duran; Diana Durango; Andrea Pérez Peña	Peru; Leslie Alarcón; Liz Carrion; Miriam Quintanilla
10 m air rifle	Jazmine Matta; Guatemala	Camila Osorio; Colombia	Ángela Rodríguez; Colombia
10 m air rifle team	Guatemala; Tatiana Linares; Jazmine Matta; Polymaria Velasquez	El Salvador; Melissa Mikec; Johanna Pineda; Ana Ramirez	Colombia; Angelica Berrio; Camila Osorio; Ángela Rodríguez
50 m rifle 3 positions	Ana Ramirez; El Salvador	Sara Vizcarra; Peru	Maria Guerra; Guatemala
50 m rifle 3 positions team	El Salvador; Melissa Mikec; Johanna Pineda; Ana Ramirez	Guatemala; Maria Guerra; Tatiana Linares; Polymaria Velasquez	Peru; Alexia Arenas; Andrea Indacochea; Sara Vizcarra
Skeet	Francisca Crovetto; Chile	Daniella Borda; Peru	Medeleine Velasco; Bolivia
Trap	Stefanie Goetzke; Guatemala	Maria Colindres; Guatemala	Ana Soto; Guatemala

=== Softball ===
Event	Gold	Silver	Bronze
Women	Venezuela; Yuruby Alicart; Ana Teresa Coscorrosa; Osglimar Cruz; Jocelin Diaz; Estefany Duno; Ingrid Escobar; Denisse Fuenmayor; Mirian Jimenez; Glorianys Lara; Sorangel Ledezma; Osmary Orta; Alondra Perez; Geraldine Puertas; Anyibell Ramirez; Felianis Reyes; Cristina Rodriguez; Yaicey Sojo	Colombia; Paula Caraballo; Briana Castro; Beatriz Cudriz; Erika Diaz; Jennifer Garcia; Vianys García; Kerling Guzman; Libis Hurtado; Danisha Livingston; Johana Martinez; Olga Mazo; Chelsea McLean; Ketty Millian; Solibeth Nuñez; Darlys Perez; Sugey Solano	Panama; Irania Buitrago; Kimberlin Caballero; Kaisy Cardenas; Cibelis Cedeño; Keisy Cohen; Leira Delgado; Yaisseth Espino; Jinna Howard; Yulissa Mendieta; Any Rios; Luzmar Rixiell; Maria Samaniego; Argelis Sanjur; Marlenis Vargas; Ciara Vergara; Milagros Villareal; Velkis Zamora

=== Squash ===
Event	Gold	Silver	Bronze
Men's singles	Miguel Ángel Rodríguez; Colombia	Diego Elías; Peru	Juan Camilo Vargas; Colombia
Men's singles	Miguel Ángel Rodríguez; Colombia	Diego Elías; Peru	Jaime Pinto; Chile
Women's singles	Catalina Peláez; Colombia	Laura Tovar; Colombia	Ana María Pinto; Chile
Women's singles	Catalina Peláez; Colombia	Laura Tovar; Colombia	Giselle Delgado; Chile
Men's doubles	Peru; Diego Elías; Alonso Escudero	Colombia; Juan Camilo Vargas; Ronald Palomino	Ecuador; David Costales; Ernesto Davila
Men's doubles	Peru; Diego Elías; Alonso Escudero	Colombia; Juan Camilo Vargas; Ronald Palomino	Paraguay; Carlos Nicolás Caballero; Esteban Casarino
Women's doubles	Colombia; María Tovar; Laura Tovar	Chile; Giselle Delgado; Ana María Pinto	Guatemala; Libsy Cardona; María Fernanda Pinot
Women's doubles	Colombia; María Tovar; Laura Tovar	Chile; Giselle Delgado; Ana María Pinto	Ecuador; María Caridad Buenaño; Micaela Donoso
Mixed doubles	Colombia; Catalina Peláez; Miguel Ángel Rodríguez	Guatemala; Mauricio Sedano; Winifer Bonilla	Ecuador; Alvaro Buenaño; María Paula Moya
Mixed doubles	Colombia; Catalina Peláez; Miguel Ángel Rodríguez	Guatemala; Mauricio Sedano; Winifer Bonilla	Paraguay; Francesco Marcantonio; Luján Palacios
Men's team	Colombia; Edgar Ramírez; Miguel Ángel Rodríguez; Juan Camilo Vargas; Ronald Palomino	Peru; Diego Elías; Alonso Escudero; Alvaro Garcia; Andres Duanny	Chile; Jaime Pinto; Rafael Allendes; Sebastian Gallegos
Men's team	Colombia; Edgar Ramírez; Miguel Ángel Rodríguez; Juan Camilo Vargas; Ronald Palomino	Peru; Diego Elías; Alonso Escudero; Alvaro Garcia; Andres Duanny	Guatemala; Edwin Enriquez; Junior Enriquez; Mauricio Sedano
Women's team	Colombia; Catalina Peláez; María Tovar; Laura Tovar; Karol González	Chile; Giselle Delgado; Ana María Pinto; Camila Gallegos	Ecuador; Andrea Frixone; Micaela Donoso; María Caridad Buenaño; María Paula Moya
Women's team	Colombia; Catalina Peláez; María Tovar; Laura Tovar; Karol González	Chile; Giselle Delgado; Ana María Pinto; Camila Gallegos	Peru; María Paz Picasso; Claudia Suárez; María Pia Hermosa; Ximena Rodríguez

=== Swimming ===
Men

Event	Gold	Silver	Bronze
50 m freestyle	Alberto Mestre; Venezuela	Leonardo Gonzalez; Ecuador	Oliver Elliot; Chile
100 m freestyle	Benjamin Hockin; Paraguay	Alberto Mestre; Venezuela	Bryan Chavez; Venezuela
200 m freestyle	Marcos Lavado; Venezuela	Aitor Fugariño; Venezuela	Santiago Corredor; Colombia
400 m freestyle	Rafael Davila; Venezuela	Santiago Corredor; Colombia	Andy Arteta; Venezuela
1500 m freestyle	Rafael Davila; Venezuela	Andy Arteta; Venezuela	Joseph Macias; Ecuador
100 m backstroke	Omar Pinzón; Colombia	Charles Hockin; Paraguay	Robinson Molina; Venezuela
200 m backstroke	Omar Pinzón; Colombia	Charles Hockin; Paraguay	Robinson Molina; Venezuela
100 m breaststroke	Jorge Murillo; Colombia	Carlos Claverie; Venezuela	Édgar Crespo; Panama
200 m breaststroke	Carlos Claverie; Venezuela	Jorge Murillo; Colombia	Carlos Mahecha; Colombia
100 m butterfly	Benjamin Hockin; Paraguay	Esnaider Reales; Colombia	Marcos Lavado; Venezuela
200 m butterfly	Jonathan Gómez; Colombia	Marcos Lavado; Venezuela	David Arias; Colombia
200 m individual medley	Tomas Peribonio; Ecuador	Jonathan Gómez; Colombia	Carlos Claverie; Venezuela
400 m individual medley	Jonathan Gómez; Colombia	Tomas Peribonio; Ecuador	Carlos Claverie; Venezuela
4 × 100 m freestyle relay	Venezuela; Aitor Fugariño; Alberto Mestre; Bryan Chavez; Robinson Molina	Colombia; Carlos Mahecha; Esnaider Reales; Marco González; Santiago Aguilera	Paraguay; Benjamin Hockin; Charles Hockin; Matheo Mateos; William Vallejos
4 × 200 m freestyle relay	Venezuela; Aitor Fugariño; Andy Arteta; Marcos Lavado; Rafael Davila	Colombia; Jonathan Gómez; Juan Morales; Omar Pinzón; Santiago Corredor	Ecuador; Anyelo Mendoza; Joseph Macias; Leonardo Gonzalez; Tomas Peribonio
4 × 100 m medley relay	Venezuela; Alberto Mestre; Carlos Claverie; Marcos Lavado; Robinson Molina	Colombia; David Arias; Esnaider Reales; Jorge Murillo; Omar Pinzón	Paraguay; Benjamin Hockin; Charles Hockin; Matheo Mateos; Renato Prono
5 km open water	Diego Vera; Venezuela	Wilder Carreño; Venezuela	Iván Enderica Ochoa; Ecuador
10 km open water	Wilder Carreño; Venezuela	Iván Enderica Ochoa; Ecuador	Diego Vera; Venezuela

Women

Event	Gold	Silver	Bronze
50 m freestyle	Karen Torrez; Bolivia	Isabella Arcila; Colombia	Anicka Delgado; Ecuador
100 m freestyle	Isabella Arcila; Colombia	Karen Torrez; Bolivia	Jessica Cattaneo; Peru
200 m freestyle	Jessica Cattaneo; Peru	Andreina Pinto; Venezuela	María Álvarez; Colombia
400 m freestyle	Andreina Pinto; Venezuela	Kristel Köbrich; Chile	Samantha Arévalo; Ecuador
800 m freestyle	Kristel Köbrich; Chile	Andreina Pinto; Venezuela	Samantha Arévalo; Ecuador
100 m backstroke	Isabella Arcila; Colombia	Carla Gonzalez; Venezuela	Michelle Narvaez; Colombia
200 m backstroke	Andrea Hurtado; Peru	Michelle Narvaez; Colombia	Laura Melo; Colombia
100 m breaststroke	Mercedes Toledo; Venezuela	Karina Vivas; Colombia	Juliana Cifuentes; Colombia
200 m breaststroke	Mercedes Toledo; Venezuela	Paula Tamashiro; Peru	Salomé Vélez; Colombia
100 m butterfly	Isabella Páez; Venezuela	Jeserik Pinto; Venezuela	Valentina Becerra; Colombia
200 m butterfly	Isabella Páez; Venezuela	Azra Avdic; Peru	Maria Clara Roman Mantilla; Colombia
200 m individual medley	McKenna DeBever; Peru	Anicka Delgado; Ecuador	Celina Márquez; El Salvador
400 m individual medley	Azra Avdic; Peru	Samantha Arévalo; Ecuador	Kristel Köbrich; Chile
4 × 100 m freestyle relay	Colombia; Isabella Arcila; Maria Paola Muñoz; María Álvarez; Valentina Becerra	Venezuela; Andrea Garrido; Isabella Páez; Jeserik Pinto; Mercedes Toledo	Peru; Andrea Hurtado; Azra Avdic; Jessica Cattaneo; McKenna DeBever
4 × 200 m freestyle relay	Peru; Azra Avdic; Jessica Cattaneo; McKenna DeBever; Samantha Bello	Colombia; Karen Durango; Maria Clara Roman Mantilla; Maria Paola Muñoz; María Álvarez	Venezuela; Andrea Garrido; Andreina Pinto; Isabella Páez; Mercedes Toledo
4 × 100 m medley relay	Venezuela; Carla Gonzalez; Isabella Páez; Jeserik Pinto; Mercedes Toledo	Colombia; Isabella Arcila; Juliana Cifuentes; Maria Paola Muñoz; Valentina Becerra	Peru; Andrea Hurtado; Azra Avdic; Jessica Cattaneo; Paula Tamashiro
5 km open water	Samantha Arévalo; Ecuador	Liliana Hernández; Venezuela	Nataly Caldas; Ecuador
10 km open water	Samantha Arévalo; Ecuador	María Bramont-Arias; Peru	Liliana Hernández; Venezuela

Mixed

Event	Gold	Silver	Bronze
4 × 100 m freestyle relay	Venezuela; Alberto Mestre; Bryan Chavez; Jeserik Pinto; Mercedes Toledo	Colombia; Esnaider Reales; Isabella Arcila; Maria Paola Muñoz; Santiago Aguilera	Ecuador; Anicka Delgado; Leonardo Gonzalez; Tomas Peribonio; Ursula Demarquet
4 × 100 m medley relay	Colombia; Isabella Arcila; Jorge Murillo; Omar Pinzón; Valentina Becerra	Venezuela; Alberto Mestre; Carla Gonzalez; Carlos Claverie; Isabella Páez	Paraguay; Benjamin Hockin; Maria Arrua; Renato Prono; Stefania Piccardo

=== Synchronized swimming ===
Event	Gold	Silver	Bronze
Women's solo	Colombia; Estefanía Álvarez	Chile; Isidora Letelier	Venezuela; Lilia Nuñez
Women's duet	Colombia; Estefanía Álvarez; Mónica Arango	Chile; Bianca Consigliere; Isidora Letelier; Isidora Soto	Venezuela; Karla Loaiza; Lilia Nuñez; María Fernanda Romero
Women's team	Colombia; Estefanía Álvarez; Ingrid Usuga; Isabella Franco; Jennifer Cerquera; Jhoselyne Taborda; María Fernanda Vásquez; Mónica Arango; Valentina Orozco; Valentina Ramírez; Viviana Valle	Venezuela; Anastasia Roque; Diana Sibriani; Karla Loaiza; Lilia Nuñez; María Fernanda Romero; Naigeris Sanchez; Nicolle Salazar; Sandry Navarro; Sharon Bastardo; Ursula Alvarez	Peru; Ana Espinoza; Carla Morales; Cielomar Romero; Karen Rolando; Lucía Blancas; María Fe Lopez; María Teresa Garcia; Sandy Quiroz; Tania Patiño; Valeria Romero
Women's team free routine	Colombia; Estefanía Álvarez; Ingrid Usuga; Isabella Franco; Jennifer Cerquera; Jhoselyne Taborda; María Fernanda Vásquez; Mónica Arango; Valentina Orozco; Viviana Valle	Chile; Beatriz Osorio; Bianca Consigliere; Catalina Fleckenstein; Gloria Carrasco; Isidora Letelier; Isidora Soto; Kelley Kobler; Natalie Lubascher; Rafaella Signorelli	Peru; Ana Espinoza; Carla Morales; Cielomar Romero; Karen Rolando; Lucía Blancas; María Fe Lopez; María Teresa Garcia; Sandy Quiroz; Tania Patiño; Valeria Romero

=== Table tennis ===
Event	Gold	Silver	Bronze
Men's singles	Alberto Miño; Ecuador	Diego Rodríguez; Peru	Emil Santos; Dominican Republic
Men's singles	Alberto Miño; Ecuador	Diego Rodríguez; Peru	Rodrigo Hidalgo; Peru
Women's singles	Paula Medina; Colombia	María Paulina Vega; Chile	Mabelyn Enriquez; Guatemala
Women's singles	Paula Medina; Colombia	María Paulina Vega; Chile	Neridee Niño; Venezuela
Men's doubles	Ecuador; Alberto Miño; Emiliano Riofrio	Paraguay; Axel Gavilan; Marcelo Aguirre	Colombia; Julian Ramos; Joaquin Villegas
Men's doubles	Ecuador; Alberto Miño; Emiliano Riofrio	Paraguay; Axel Gavilan; Marcelo Aguirre	Peru; Bryan Blas; Rodrigo Hidalgo
Women's doubles	Colombia; Paula Medina; Luisa Zuluaga	Chile; Judith Morales; María Paulina Vega	Venezuela; Roxy González; Neridee Niño
Women's doubles	Colombia; Paula Medina; Luisa Zuluaga	Chile; Judith Morales; María Paulina Vega	Guatemala; Mabelyn Enriquez; Andrea Estrada
Mixed doubles	Ecuador; Alberto Miño; Nathaly Paredes	Peru; Bryan Blas; Paola Mori	Chile; Gustavo Gómez; Judith Morales
Mixed doubles	Ecuador; Alberto Miño; Nathaly Paredes	Peru; Bryan Blas; Paola Mori	Guatemala; Mabelyn Enriquez; Heber Moscoso
Men's team	Paraguay; Axel Gavilan; Marcelo Aguirre; Darío Toranzos	Chile; Gustavo Gómez; Manuel Moya; Felipe Olivares; Alejandro Rodríguez	Ecuador; Adrian Cabrera; John Espinoza; Alberto Miño; Emiliano Riofrio
Men's team	Paraguay; Axel Gavilan; Marcelo Aguirre; Darío Toranzos	Chile; Gustavo Gómez; Manuel Moya; Felipe Olivares; Alejandro Rodríguez	Peru; Bryan Blas; Felipe Duffoo; Rodrigo Hidalgo; Diego Rodríguez
Women's team	Chile; Cristal Meneses; Judith Morales; Daniela Ortega; María Paulina Vega	Colombia; Manuela Echeverry; Paula Medina; Luisa Zuluaga	Venezuela; Gremlis Arvelo; Roxy González; Neridee Niño; Camila Obando
Women's team	Chile; Cristal Meneses; Judith Morales; Daniela Ortega; María Paulina Vega	Colombia; Manuela Echeverry; Paula Medina; Luisa Zuluaga	Dominican Republic; Eva Brito; Esmerlyn Castro; Cinthya Sanchez

=== Taekwondo ===
Event	Gold	Silver	Bronze
Men's poomsae	Isaac Vélez; Colombia	Hugo Del Castillo; Peru	Yung Hernández; Venezuela
Men's poomsae	Isaac Vélez; Colombia	Hugo Del Castillo; Peru	Henry Sigchos; Ecuador
Women's poomsae	Marcela Castillo; Peru	María Suache; Colombia	Claudia Cárdenas; Ecuador
Women's poomsae	Marcela Castillo; Peru	María Suache; Colombia	Daniela Méndez; Bolivia
Men's kyorugi 54 kg	Backer Barreto; Peru	Harold Avella; Colombia	Cleiver Olaizola; Venezuela
Men's kyorugi 54 kg	Backer Barreto; Peru	Harold Avella; Colombia	Bryan Zapata; Chile
Men's kyorugi 58 kg	Luis Oblitas; Peru	Jefferson Ochoa; Colombia	Jorge Ramos; Chile
Men's kyorugi 58 kg	Luis Oblitas; Peru	Jefferson Ochoa; Colombia	Chester Peralta; Ecuador
Men's kyorugi 63 kg	Sebastián Navea; Chile	Braulio León; Peru	Álvaro Gómez; Colombia
Men's kyorugi 63 kg	Sebastián Navea; Chile	Braulio León; Peru	Leyner Congo; Ecuador
Men's kyorugi 68 kg	Miguel Trejos; Colombia	Alexander Ortiz; Peru	Ignacio Morales; Chile
Men's kyorugi 68 kg	Miguel Trejos; Colombia	Alexander Ortiz; Peru	Wilkin Heredia; Dominican Republic
Men's kyorugi 74 kg	Neyder Lozano; Colombia	Esmeylin Pérez; Dominican Republic	Yorfren Benavides; Venezuela
Men's kyorugi 74 kg	Neyder Lozano; Colombia	Esmeylin Pérez; Dominican Republic	Roger Pitti; Panama
Men's kyorugi 80 kg	Kenny Lejarazo; Venezuela	Camilo Baena; Colombia	Bastian Muñoz; Chile
Men's kyorugi 80 kg	Kenny Lejarazo; Venezuela	Camilo Baena; Colombia	Juan Pablo Canedo; Bolivia
Men's kyorugi 87 kg	Moisés Molinares; Colombia	Carlos Eduardo; Venezuela	Marco Lara; Ecuador
Men's kyorugi 87 kg	Moisés Molinares; Colombia	Carlos Eduardo; Venezuela	Carlos Kroll; Peru
Men's kyorugi +87 kg	Luis Álvarez; Venezuela	Jesús Perea; Ecuador	Walter Saldarriaga; Colombia
Women's kyorugi 46 kg	Virginia Del Carmen; Venezuela	Andrea Ramírez; Colombia	Nayda Vela; Ecuador
Women's kyorugi 46 kg	Virginia Del Carmen; Venezuela	Andrea Ramírez; Colombia	Katherine Calderon; Peru
Women's kyorugi 49 kg	Ibeth Rodríguez; Colombia	Julissa Diez Canseco; Peru	Belén Briceño; Chile
Women's kyorugi 49 kg	Ibeth Rodríguez; Colombia	Julissa Diez Canseco; Peru	Noris Borges; Venezuela
Women's kyorugi 53 kg	Francisca Ríos; Chile	Laura García; Colombia	Alisson Alava; Ecuador
Women's kyorugi 53 kg	Francisca Ríos; Chile	Laura García; Colombia	Elizabeth Alvarado; Peru
Women's kyorugi 57 kg	Carolena Carstens; Panama	Katherine Toro; Colombia	Fernanda Aguirre; Chile
Women's kyorugi 57 kg	Carolena Carstens; Panama	Katherine Toro; Colombia	Virginia Salazar; Ecuador
Women's kyorugi 62 kg	Madelyn Rodríguez; Dominican Republic	Alba Gómez; Colombia	Fabiola Escobar; El Salvador
Women's kyorugi 62 kg	Madelyn Rodríguez; Dominican Republic	Alba Gómez; Colombia	Aittana Moya; Peru
Women's kyorugi 67 kg	Katherine Dumar; Colombia	Dayana Folleco; Ecuador	Freymar Marcano; Venezuela
Women's kyorugi 67 kg	Katherine Dumar; Colombia	Dayana Folleco; Ecuador	Diana Chirinos; Peru
Women's kyorugi 73 kg	Sandra Vanegas; Colombia	Carolina Fernández; Venezuela	not awarded
Women's kyorugi +73 kg	Gloria Mosquera; Colombia	Génesis Cordero; Venezuela	not awarded

=== Tennis ===
Event	Gold	Silver	Bronze
Men's singles	Felipe Mantilla; Colombia	Roberto Quiroz; Ecuador	Cristian Rodríguez; Colombia
Women's singles	María Herazo González; Colombia	Camila Giangreco Campiz; Paraguay	Fernanda Brito; Chile
Men's doubles	Chile; Marcelo Tomás Barrios Vera; Hans Podlipnik Castillo	Colombia; Juan Manuel Benítez; Felipe Mantilla	Ecuador; Iván Endara; Roberto Quiroz
Women's doubles	Chile; Daniela Seguel; Alexa Guarachi	Peru; Anastasia Iamachkine; Dominique Schaefer	Ecuador; Marie Elise Casares; Mariana Correa
Mixed doubles	Paraguay; Camila Giangreco Campiz; Ayed Zatar	Ecuador; France Dorado; Boris Arias	Colombia; María Paulina Pérez; Juan Manuel Benítez
Men's team	Ecuador; Iván Endara; Roberto Quiroz; Diego Quiroz	Colombia; Juan Manuel Benítez; Cristian Rodríguez; Felipe Mantilla	Chile; Marcelo Tomás Barrios Vera; Bastián Malla; Hans Podlipnik Castillo
Women's team	Chile; Daniela Seguel; Alexa Guarachi; Fernanda Brito	Colombia; María Paulina Pérez; María Herazo González; Camila Osorio	Paraguay; Lara Escauriza; Camila Giangreco Campiz

=== Triathlon ===
Event	Gold	Silver	Bronze
Men's individual	Carlos Quinchara; Colombia	Juan Rubio; Colombia	Brian Moya; Colombia
Women's individual	Diana Castillo; Colombia	Maira Vargas; Colombia	Valentina Carvallo; Chile
Men's team	Colombia; Brian Moya; Carlos Quinchara; Eduardo Londoño; Juan Rubio	Ecuador; Francisco Flores; Juan Andrade; Ramon Matute	Chile; Gaspar Riveros; Javien Martin; Martin Ulloa
Women's team	Colombia; Diana Castillo; Lina Raga; Maira Vargas; Sandra Hernandez	Chile; Catalina Salazar; Macarena Salazar; Valentina Carvallo	Ecuador; Diana Vizcarra; Elizabeth Bravo; Paula Jara
Mixed relay	Colombia; Brian Moya; Carlos Quinchara; Diana Castillo; Maira Vargas	Ecuador; Diana Vizcarra; Elizabeth Bravo; Juan Andrade; Ramon Matute	Chile; Gaspar Riveros; Macarena Salazar; Martin Ulloa; Valentina Carvallo

=== Volleyball ===
Event	Gold	Silver	Bronze
Men's indoor volleyball	Venezuela; Alonzo Mendoza; Efrain Hidalgo; Jesus Gómez; Jonathan Quijada; Jorge Carranza; Julio Pérez; Luis Rivas; Paul Viloria; Ronald Fayola; Ronald Martínez; Ronald Rea; Willner Rivas	Chile; Esteban Villarreal; Gabriel Araya; Gianluca Borelli; Javier Corbella; Julian Zenteno; Lucas Lavin; Manfred Borgstedt; Matias Banda; Sebastian Castillo; Tomas Gago; Vicente Mardones; Vicente Ibarra	Colombia; Alexander Bonilla; Carlos Llanos; Cristian Murillo; Gustavo Larrahondo; Ivan Hurtado; Jeyson Morelos; Julian Guerrero; Leandro Mejía; Luis Meza; Miguel Ariza; Raul Rivas; Sebastian Giraldo
Women's indoor volleyball	Dominican Republic; Angelica Hinojosa; Brayelin Martínez; Camila de la Rosa; Gaila González; Geraldine González; Jineiry Martínez; Natalia Martínez; Vielka Peralta; Yanlis Féliz; Yokaty Pérez; Winifer Fernández; Larysmer Martínez	Peru; Alexandra Machado; Andrea Urrutia; Ángela Leyva; Diana de la Peña; Diana Magallanes; Katherine Regalado; Kiara Montes; Leslie Leyva; Maguilaura Frias; Maricarmen Guerrero; Shiamara Almeida; Valeria Takeda	Colombia; Adriana Durán; Ana Karina Olaya; Darlevis Mosquera; Emelys Martínez; Gisell Pérez; Juliana Toro; María Marín; María Sarmiento; María Caraballo; Melissa Montero; Valerin Carabali; Yarkled Veronica Pasos
Men's beach volleyball	Venezuela; José Gregorio Gómez; Rolando Hernandez	Chile; Marco Grimalt; Esteban Grimalt	Colombia; Jorge Manjarrés; Johan Murray
Women's beach volleyball	Paraguay; Michelle Valiente; Patricia Caballero	Colombia; Diana Rios; Yuli Ayala	Venezuela; Norisbeth Agudo; Gabriela Brito

=== Water polo ===
Event	Gold	Silver	Bronze
Men	Colombia; Cristian Agudelo; Jhon Andrade; Juan Echeverry; Nelson Eduardo; German Guarnico; Andres Hernandez; Juan Pablo Hernandez; Andres Hinestroza; Juan Camilo Hinestroza; Ivan Idarraga; Jorge Montoya; Simon Rozo; Enzo Salinas	Venezuela; Joaquin Armando; Wilmer Bossa; Alex Devonish; Douglas Espinoza; Andres Fasoli; José Gabriel; Pedro Gutierrez; Oliver Lopez; Jonathan Morrillo; Jonder Perdomo; Andres Pirela; Jean Andres Sanchez; Hugo Velasquez	Peru; Victor Aguilera; Sebastián Bravo; Nicolas Cordova; Sebastián Dancourt; Eduardo Grandez; Sebastián Morales; Rodrigo Pacheco; Sebastián Pastor; Nick Pizarro; Germán Rodriguez; Rodrigo Rojas; Diego Villar; Adriano Zunino

=== Water skiing ===
Event	Gold	Silver	Bronze
Men's trick	Federico Jaramillo; Colombia	Felipe Franco; Peru	Santiago Varas; Chile
Men's slalom	Robert Pigozzi; Dominican Republic	Santiago Correa; Colombia	Mario Mustafá; Peru
Men's jump	Emile Ritter; Chile	Santiago Varas; Chile	Roberto Linares; Colombia
Men's overall	Santiago Varas; Chile	Federico Jaramillo; Colombia	Roberto Linares; Colombia
Men's wakeboard	Jorge Rocha; Colombia	Jamie Bazán; Ecuador	Vicente Carcamo; Chile
Women's trick	Luisa Jaramillo; Colombia	Daniela Verswyvel; Colombia	Josefa González; Chile
Women's slalom	María De Osma; Peru	Luisa Jaramillo; Colombia	Andrea Tejada; Peru
Women's jump	María De Osma; Peru	Andrea Tejada; Peru	Isabela Jaramillo; Colombia
Women's overall	Valentina González; Chile	María De Osma; Peru	Luisa Jaramillo; Colombia
Women's wakeboard	Maria Jose Vélez; Colombia	Manuela Castro; Ecuador	Ana Cristina Sisul; Paraguay

=== Wrestling ===
Event	Gold	Silver	Bronze
Men's Greco-Roman 59 kg	Ditcher Toro; Colombia	Anthony Palencia; Venezuela	Jancel Pimentel; Dominican Republic
Men's Greco-Roman 59 kg	Ditcher Toro; Colombia	Anthony Palencia; Venezuela	Alex Pineda; Panama
Men's Greco-Roman 66 kg	Wuileixis Rivas; Venezuela	Luis Alfredo; Dominican Republic	Jair Cuero; Colombia
Men's Greco-Roman 66 kg	Wuileixis Rivas; Venezuela	Luis Alfredo; Dominican Republic	Mario Molina; Peru
Men's Greco-Roman 75 kg	Luis Avendaño; Venezuela	Enrique Cuero; Ecuador	Johan Antonio Batista; Dominican Republic
Men's Greco-Roman 75 kg	Luis Avendaño; Venezuela	Enrique Cuero; Ecuador	Carlos Valor; Colombia
Men's Greco-Roman 85 kg	Carlos Muñoz; Colombia	Yorgen Cova; Venezuela	Carlos Adames; Dominican Republic
Men's Greco-Roman 85 kg	Carlos Muñoz; Colombia	Yorgen Cova; Venezuela	Ricardo Cardenas; Peru
Men's Greco-Roman 98 kg	José Arias; Dominican Republic	Oscar Loango; Colombia	Kempton Aparicio; Panama
Men's Greco-Roman 98 kg	José Arias; Dominican Republic	Oscar Loango; Colombia	Alexander Brazon; Venezuela
Men's Greco-Roman 130 kg	Erwin Caraballo; Venezuela	Rodolfo Waithe; Panama	Andrés Ayub; Chile
Men's Greco-Roman 130 kg	Erwin Caraballo; Venezuela	Rodolfo Waithe; Panama	Gilberto Perez; Colombia
Men's freestyle 57 kg	Juan Rubelín Ramírez; Dominican Republic	Yerson Hernandez; Colombia	Pedro Mejías; Venezuela
Men's freestyle 57 kg	Juan Rubelín Ramírez; Dominican Republic	Yerson Hernandez; Colombia	Marvin Chavez; Bolivia
Men's freestyle 65 kg	Anthony Montero; Venezuela	Álbaro Rudesindo; Dominican Republic	Hernan Guzman; Colombia
Men's freestyle 65 kg	Anthony Montero; Venezuela	Álbaro Rudesindo; Dominican Republic	Luis Portillo; El Salvador
Men's freestyle 74 kg	Cristian Sarco; Venezuela	Yorfi Jimenez; Dominican Republic	Juan Peralta; Chile
Men's freestyle 74 kg	Cristian Sarco; Venezuela	Yorfi Jimenez; Dominican Republic	Nestor Taffur; Colombia
Men's freestyle 86 kg	Pedro Ceballos; Venezuela	Carlos Izquierdo; Colombia	Billy Valdez; Dominican Republic
Men's freestyle 86 kg	Pedro Ceballos; Venezuela	Carlos Izquierdo; Colombia	Pool Ambrocio; Peru
Men's freestyle 97 kg	José Daniel Díaz; Venezuela	Luis Miguel Pérez; Dominican Republic	Juan Martínez; Colombia
Men's freestyle 125 kg	Luis Vivenes; Venezuela	Jarlis Mosquera; Colombia	Carlos Felix; Dominican Republic
Men's freestyle 125 kg	Luis Vivenes; Venezuela	Jarlis Mosquera; Colombia	Jorge Medina; Ecuador
Women's freestyle 48 kg	Thalía Mallqui; Peru	Jacqueline Mollocana; Ecuador	Dubraika Rodriguez; Venezuela
Women's freestyle 48 kg	Thalía Mallqui; Peru	Jacqueline Mollocana; Ecuador	Alisson Cardozo; Colombia
Women's freestyle 53 kg	Betzabeth Argüello; Venezuela	Carolina Castillo; Colombia	Luisa Valverde; Ecuador
Women's freestyle 58 kg	Yessica Oviedo; Dominican Republic	Eva Gonzalez; Colombia	Leonela Ayoví; Ecuador
Women's freestyle 58 kg	Yessica Oviedo; Dominican Republic	Eva Gonzalez; Colombia	Ninfa Yupari; Bolivia
Women's freestyle 63 kg	Nathaly Grimán; Venezuela	Jackeline Rentería; Colombia	Mayra Antes; Ecuador
Women's freestyle 63 kg	Nathaly Grimán; Venezuela	Jackeline Rentería; Colombia	Yanet Sovero; Peru
Women's freestyle 69 kg	Diana Cruz; Peru	María Acosta; Venezuela	Edna Arboleda; Colombia
Women's freestyle 75 kg	Soleymi Caraballo; Venezuela	Andrea Olaya; Colombia	Lesly Arce; Ecuador

== See also ==
- Pan American Games
  - Central American and Caribbean Games
  - Central American Games
  - South American Games
