= Badminton at the 2015 Pan American Games – Men's doubles =

Badminton – Men's doubles at the 2015 Pan American Games
- Venue: Atos Markham Pan Am Centre
- Dates: July 11 - July 16
- Competitors: 26 from 10 nations

Medalists
Gold medal	Phillip Chew; Sattawat Pongnairat	United States
Silver medal	Hugo Arthuso; Daniel Paiola	Brazil
Bronze medal	Willian Cabrera; Nelson Javier	Dominican Republic
Bronze medal	Job Castillo; Lino Muñoz	Mexico

The men's doubles badminton event at the 2015 Pan American Games will be held from July 11–16 at the Atos Markham Pan Am Centre in Toronto. The defending Pan American Games champions are Howard Bach and Tony Gunawan of the United States.

The athletes will be drawn into an elimination stage draw. Once a team lost a match, it will be not longer able to compete. Each match will be contested as the best of three games.

== Schedule ==
All times are Central Standard Time (UTC-6).

Date	Time	Round
July 12, 2015	10:45	First Round
July 13, 2015	10:00	Quarterfinals
July 14, 2015	11:30	Semifinals
July 15, 2015	14:45	Final

== Seeds ==
1. Phillip Chew / Sattawat Pongnairat (USA) (champions)
2. Rodolfo Ramirez / Jonathan Solis (GUA) (quarterfinals)

== Results ==
=== Finals ===
Semifinals
1	Phillip Chew (United States) Sattawat Pongnairat (USA)	21	21
Job Castillo (Mexico) Lino Muñoz (MEX)	19	13
Willian Cabrera (Dominican Republic) Nelson Javier (DOM)	13	21
Hugo Arthuso (Brazil) Daniel Paiola (BRA)	21	23

Final
1	Phillip Chew (United States) Sattawat Pongnairat (USA)	21	21
Hugo Arthuso (Brazil) Daniel Paiola (BRA)	18	16

=== Top half ===
First round
F Diaz (Argentina) P Macagno (ARG)	15	14
G Henry (Jamaica) D Reid (JAM)	21	21
YC de Oliveira (Brazil) A Tjong (BRA)	10	17
M Cuba (Peru) M Del Valle (PER)	22	21

Quarterfinals
1	P Chew (United States) S Pongnairat (USA)	21	21
G Henry (Jamaica) D Reid (JAM)	14	17
J Castillo (Mexico) L Muñoz (MEX)	21	21
M Cuba (Peru) M Del Valle (PER)	17	14

Semifinal
1	P Chew (United States) S Pongnairat (USA)	21	21
J Castillo (Mexico) L Muñoz (MEX)	19	13

=== Bottom half ===
First round
W Cabrera (Dominican Republic) N Javier (DOM)	21	21
C Araya (Chile) I Leon (CHI)	19	18
L Garrido (Mexico) A Ocegueda (MEX)	19	21	19
L Martinez (Cuba) E Reyes (CUB)	21	11	21
H Arthuso (Brazil) D Paiola (BRA)	21	21
A Corpancho (Peru) J Guevara (PER)	13	17

Quarterfinals
W Cabrera (Dominican Republic) N Javier (DOM)	21	21
L Martinez (Cuba) E Reyes (CUB)	15	14
H Arthuso (Brazil) D Paiola (BRA)	21	21
2	R Ramirez (Guatemala) J Solis (GUA)	15	18

Semifinal
W Cabrera (Dominican Republic) N Javier (DOM)	13	21
H Arthuso (Brazil) D Paiola (BRA)	21	23
