= Therry Aquino =

Dominican Republic badminton player (born 1996)

Personal information
- Born: Therry Aquino Soriano; 26 July 1996 (age 30)

Sport
- Country: Dominican Republic
- Sport: Badminton

Men's singles & doubles
- Highest ranking: 470 (MS) 17 Nov 2016; 274 (MD) 10 Nov 2016
- BWF profile

Therry Aquino Soriano (born 26 July 1996) is a Dominican Republic male badminton player. In 2016, he was selected as the Dominican Republic national badminton team. In August 2016, he became the runner-up of the Carebaco International tournament in the men's doubles event partnered with Reimi Starling Cabrera Rosario. He and Cabrera, also the semi-finalist at the 2016 Santo Domingo Open tournament. Together with the Dominican Republic badminton team, he won the mixed team gold medal at the 2016 Caribbean Badminton Championships.

== Achievements ==
=== BWF International Challenge/Series ===
Men's doubles
Year	Tournament	Partner	Opponent	Score	Result
2017	Santo Domingo Open	(Dominican Republic) Reimi Starling Cabrera Rosario	(Cuba) Osleni Guerrero (Cuba) Leodannis Martinez	12–21, 14–21	(silver) Runner-up
2016	Carebaco International	(Dominican Republic) Reimi Starling Cabrera Rosario	(Suriname) Dylan Darmohoetomo (Suriname) Gilmar Jones	18–21, 15–21	(silver) Runner-up

BWF International Challenge tournament
BWF International Series tournament
BWF Future Series tournament
