= Badminton at the 2011 Pan American Games – Men's doubles =

Badminton – Men's doubles at the 2011 Pan American Games
- Venue: Multipurpose Gymnasium
- Dates: October 15 - October 19
- Competitors: 32 from 13 nations

Medalists
Gold medal	Howard Bach; Tony Gunawan	United States
Silver medal	Halim Haryanto Ho; Sattawat Pongnairat	United States
Bronze medal	Adrian Liu; Derrick Ng	Canada
Bronze medal	Andrés López; Lino Muñoz	Mexico

The men's doubles badminton event at the 2011 Pan American Games was held from October 15–19 at the Multipurpose Gymnasium in Guadalajara. The defending Pan American Games champions were William Milroy and Mike Beres of Canada, while the defending Pan American Championship champions were Sameera Gunatileka and Vincent Nguy of the United States. Beres retired after the 2008 Summer Olympics in Beijing, China.

The athletes were drawn into an elimination stage draw.

The draw for the competition was done on October 10, 2011.

== Seeds ==
1. Howard Bach / Tony Gunawan (USA) (champions)
2. Adrian Liu / Derrick Ng (CAN) (semifinals)
3. Hugo Arthuso / Daniel Paiola (BRA) (quarterfinals)
4. Luíz dos Santos / Alex Tjong (BRA) (first round)

== Results ==
=== Finals ===
Semifinals
1	Howard Bach (United States) Tony Gunawan (USA)	21	21
Andrés López (Mexico) Lino Muñoz (MEX)	12	12
Halim Haryanto Ho (United States) Sattawat Pongnairat (USA)	22	21
2	Adrian Liu (Canada) Derrick Ng (CAN)	20	14

Final
1	Howard Bach (United States) Tony Gunawan (USA)	21	21
Halim Haryanto Ho (United States) Sattawat Pongnairat (USA)	10	14

=== Top half ===
First Round
1	H Bach (United States) T Gunawan (USA)	21	21
G Henry (Jamaica) C Pyne (JAM)	12	5
N Javier (Dominican Republic) A Raposo (DOM)	11	17
O Guerrero (Cuba) R Toledo (CUB)	21	21
4	L dos Santos (Brazil) A Tjong (BRA)	16	16
A López (Mexico) L Muñoz (MEX)	21	21
C Araya (Chile) E Mujica (CHI)	21	21
J Lazo (Venezuela) L Uzcategui (VEN)	10	6

Quarterfinals
1	H Bach (United States) T Gunawan (USA)	21	21
O Guerrero (Cuba) R Toledo (CUB)	9	14
A López (Mexico) L Muñoz (MEX)	21	21
C Araya (Chile) E Mujica (CHI)	11	15

Semifinals
1	H Bach (United States) T Gunawan (USA)	21	21
A López (Mexico) L Muñoz (MEX)	12	12

=== Bottom half ===
First Round
A de Vinatea (Peru) M del Valle (PER)	21	15	13
H Haryanto Ho (United States) S Pongnairat (USA)	17	21	21
V Soeroredjo (Suriname) M Wongsodikromo (SUR)	18	21	11
3	H Arthuso (Brazil) D Paiola (BRA)	21	17	21
R Ramírez (Guatemala) P Yang (GUA)	16	21	17
J Castillo (Mexico) A Ocegueda (MEX)	21	16	21
L Camacho (Venezuela) K Matute (VEN)	5	6
2	A Liu (Canada) D Ng (CAN)	21	21

Quarterfinals
H Haryanto Ho (United States) S Pongnairat (USA)	21	21
3	H Arthuso (Brazil) D Paiola (BRA)	17	15
J Castillo (Mexico) A Ocegueda (MEX)	13	14
2	A Liu (Canada) D Ng (CAN)	21	21

Semifinals
H Haryanto Ho (United States) S Pongnairat (USA)	22	21
2	A Liu (Canada) D Ng (CAN)	20	14
