= Reimi Cabrera Rosario =

Dominican Republican badminton player (born 1995)

Personal information
- Born: Reimi Starling Cabrera Rosario; 31 January 1995 (age 31)
- Height: 1.85 m (6 ft 1 in)
- Weight: 78 kg (172 lb)

Sport
- Country: Dominican Republic
- Sport: Badminton

Men'singles & doubles
- Highest ranking: 362 (MS 2 February 2018); 172 (MD 13 July 2017); 284 (XD 5 July 2018)
- BWF profile
Medal record
Men's badminton
Representing Dominican Republic
Central American and Caribbean Games
Bronze medal – third place	2018 Barranquilla	Men's doubles

Reimi Starling Cabrera Rosario (born 31 January 1995) is a Dominican Republic badminton player. He competed at the 2014 and 2018 Central American and Caribbean Games, and clinched the 2018 bronze medal in the men's doubles event partnered with César Brito González.

== Achievements ==
=== Central American and Caribbean Games ===
Men's doubles

Year	Venue	Partner	Opponent	Score	Result
2018	Coliseo Universidad del Norte, Barranquilla, Colombia	(Dominican Republic) Cesar Adonis Brito González	(Cuba) Osleni Guerrero (Cuba) Leodannis Martínez	12–21, 10–21	Bronze

=== BWF International Challenge/Series ===
Men's doubles

Year	Tournament	Partner	Opponent	Score	Result
2017	Santo Domingo Open	(Dominican Republic) Therry Aquino	(Cuba) Osleni Guerrero (Cuba) Leodannis Martinez	12–21, 14–21	(silver) Runner-up
2016	Carebaco International	(Dominican Republic) Therry Aquino	(Suriname) Dylan Darmohoetomo (Suriname) Gilmar Jones	18–21, 15–21	(silver) Runner-up
2014	Santo Domingo Open	(Dominican Republic) William Cabrera	(Dominican Republic) Nelson Javier (Dominican Republic) Alberto Raposo	18–21, 26–24, 17–21	(silver) Runner-up

BWF International Challenge tournament
BWF International Series tournament
BWF Future Series tournament
