= César Brito González =

Dominican Republic badminton player (born 1999)

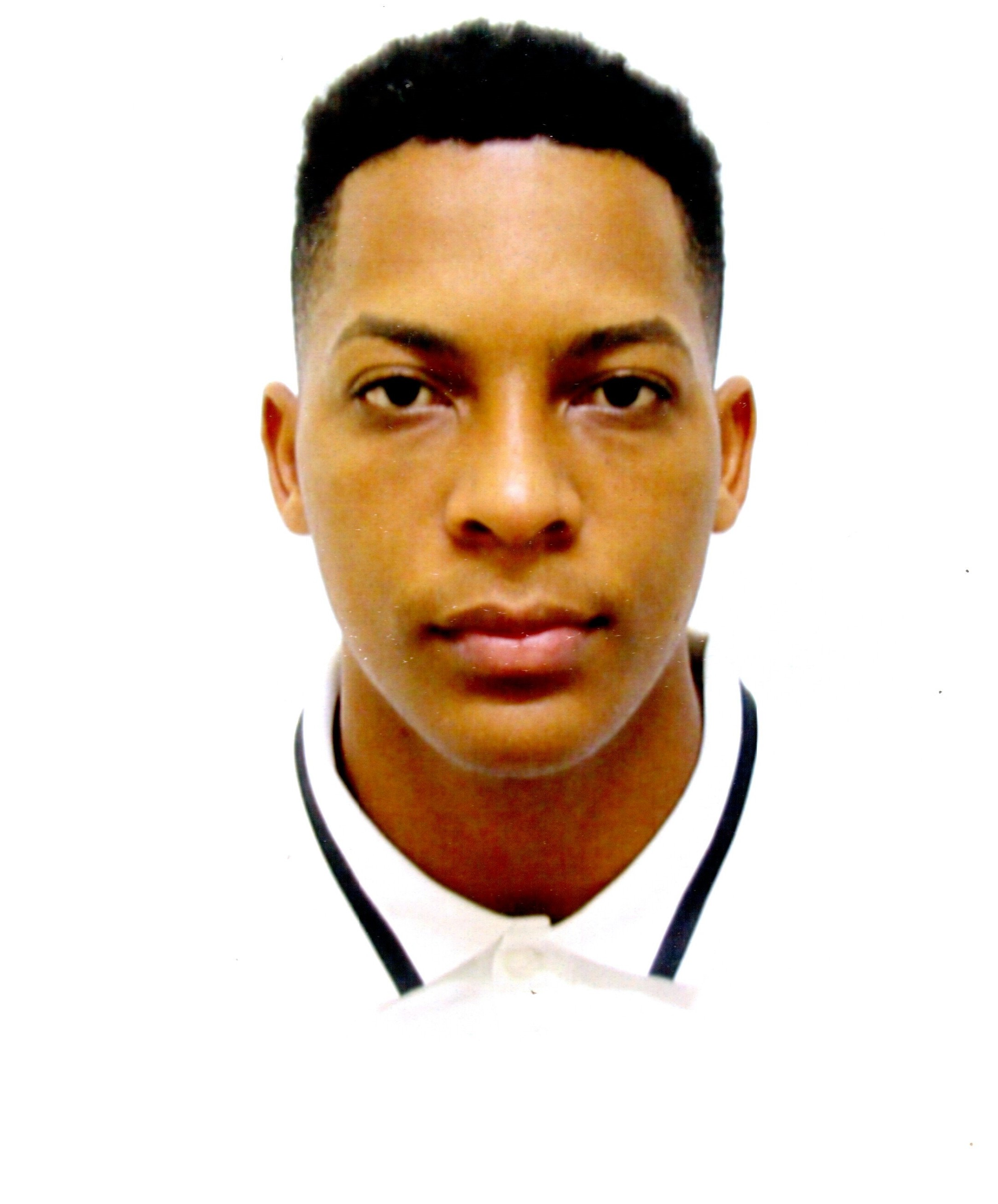

Personal information
- Born: Cesar Adonis Brito González; 10 May 1999 (age 27)
- Height: 1.77 m (5 ft 10 in)
- Weight: 79 kg (174 lb)

Sport
- Country: Dominican Republic
- Sport: Badminton

Men's singles & doubles
- Highest ranking: 274 (MS 22 November 2018); 217 (MD 13 July 2017); 158 (XD 26 October 2017)
- BWF profile
Medal record
Men's badminton
Representing Dominican Republic
Central American and Caribbean Games
Bronze medal – third place	2018 Barranquilla	Men's doubles
Pan Am Junior Championships
Bronze medal – third place	2016 Lima	Mixed doubles

César Adonis Brito González (born 10 May 1999) is a Dominican Republic badminton player. In 2016, he won bronze medal at the Pan Am Junior Badminton Championships in mixed doubles event with his partner Nairoby Abigail Jimenez. He competed at the 2018 Central American and Caribbean Games and clinched the bronze medal in the men's doubles event partnered with Reimi Cabrera.

== Achievements ==
=== Central American and Caribbean Games ===
Men's doubles
Year	Venue	Partner	Opponent	Score	Result
2018	Coliseo Universidad del Norte; Barranquilla, Colombia	(Dominican Republic) Reimi Cabrera	(Cuba) Osleni Guerrero (Cuba) Leodannis Martínez	12–21, 10–21	Bronze

=== BWF International Challenge/Series ===
Men's singles
Year	Tournament	Opponent	Score	Result
2018	Dominican Open	(Mexico) Job Castillo	14–21, 14–21	(silver) Runner-up

Mixed doubles
Year	Tournament	Partner	Opponent	Score	Result
2016	Santo Domingo Open	(Dominican Republic) Nairoby Jiménez	(Dominican Republic) William Cabrera (Dominican Republic) Licelott Sánchez	10–21, 17–21	(silver) Runner-up
2018	Suriname International	(Dominican Republic) Bermary Polanco	(Suriname) Mitchel Wongsodikromo (Jamaica) Katherine Wynter	21–10, 21–16	(gold) Winner

BWF International Challenge tournament
BWF International Series tournament
BWF Future Series tournament
