= Nairoby Abigail Jiménez =

Dominican Republic badminton player (born 2000)

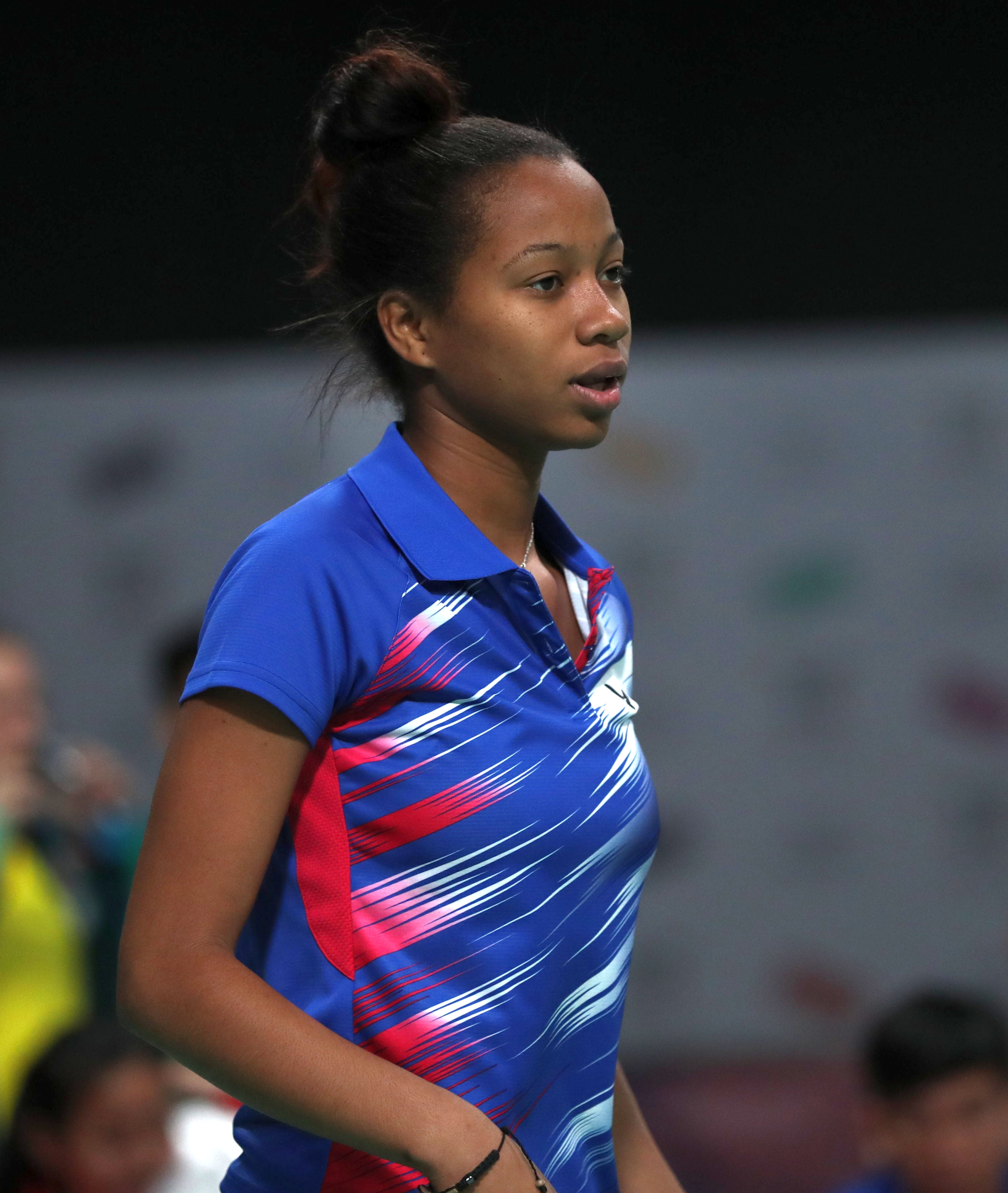
- Jiménez during the 2018 Summer Youth Olympics

Personal information
- Born: Nairoby Abigail Jiménez Ramírez; 22 October 2000 (age 26)
- Height: 1.70 m (5 ft 7 in)
- Weight: 60 kg (132 lb)

Sport
- Country: Dominican Republic
- Sport: Badminton

Women's singles & doubles
- Highest ranking: 101 (WS 9 September 2021); 85 (WD with Bermary Polanco 20 August 2019); 136 (XD with Yonatan Linarez 30 October 2023)
- BWF profile
Medal record
Women's badminton
Representing Dominican Republic
Central American and Caribbean Games
Bronze medal – third place	2018 Barranquilla	Mixed doubles
Bronze medal – third place	2023 San Salvador	Women's doubles
Bronze medal – third place	2026 Santo Domingo	Mixed doubles

Nairoby Abigail Jiménez Ramírez (born 22 October 2000) is a Dominican Republic badminton player. She competed at the 2018 Central American and Caribbean Games in Barranquilla, Colombia, and won the bronze medal in the mixed doubles event partnered with Nelson Javier.

== Achievements ==
=== Central American and Caribbean Games ===
Women's doubles
Year	Venue	Partner	Opponent	Score	Result
2023	Coliseo Complejo El Polvorín; San Salvador, El Salvador	(Dominican Republic) Alissa Acosta	(Mexico) Romina Fregoso (Mexico) Miriam Rodríguez	15–21, 17–21	Bronze

Mixed doubles
Year	Venue	Partner	Opponent	Score	Result
2018	Coliseo Universidad del Norte; Barranquilla, Colombia	(Dominican Republic) Nelson Javier	(Cuba) Leodannis Martínez (Cuba) Taymara Oropesa	21–14, 10–21, 20–22	Bronze
2026	Pabellón de Tenis de Mesa; Santo Domingo Este, Dominican Republic	(Dominican Republic) Yonatan Linarez	(Mexico) Luis Montoya (Mexico) Miriam Rodríguez	12–21, 13–21	Bronze

=== BWF International Challenge/Series (10 titles, 7 runners-up) ===
Women's singles
Year	Tournament	Opponent	Score	Result
2016	Santo Domingo Open	(Italy) Lisa Iversen	18–21, 21–19, 21–18	(gold) Winner
2018	Dominican Open	(Mexico) Sabrina Solis	5–21, 15–21	(silver) Runner-up

Women's doubles
Year	Tournament	Partner	Opponent	Score	Result
2015	Santo Domingo Open	(Dominican Republic) Licelott Sánchez	(Peru) Katherine Winder (Peru) Luz María Zornoza	15–21, 6–21	(silver) Runner-up
2016	Carebaco International	(Dominican Republic) Bermary Polanco	(Jamaica) Mikaylia Haldane (Jamaica) Katherine Wynter	21–17, 21–23, 21–15	(gold) Winner
2016	Santo Domingo Open	(Dominican Republic) Bermary Polanco	(Dominican Republic) Fanny Duarte (Wales) Aimee Moran	21–8, 21–12	(gold) Winner
2017	Carebaco International	(Dominican Republic) Licelott Sánchez	(Peru) Daniela Macías (Peru) Dánica Nishimura	19–21, 12–21	(gold) Winner
2017	Santo Domingo Open	(Dominican Republic) Licelott Sánchez	(Dominican Republic) Noemi Almonte (Dominican Republic) Bermary Polanco	26–24, 21–16	(gold) Winner
2018	Dominican Open	(Dominican Republic) Bermary Polanco	(Dominican Republic) Alisa Acosta (Dominican Republic) Kahina Vásquez	21–6, 21–10	(gold) Winner
2017	Santo Domingo Open	(Dominican Republic) Clarisa Pie	(Dominican Republic) Alissa Acosta (Dominican Republic) Daniela Acosta	21–13, 28–26	(gold) Winner
2026	Giraldilla International	(Dominican Republic) Clarisa Pie	(Cuba) Leyanis Contreras (Cuba) Taymara Oropesa	21–10, 21–15	(gold) Winner
2026	Cuba International	(Dominican Republic) Clarisa Pie	(Cuba) Leyanis Contreras (Cuba) Taymara Oropesa	17–21, 21–13, 18–21	(silver) Runner-up
2026	Paraguay Open	(Dominican Republic) Clarisa Pie	(Peru) Naomi Junco (Peru) Namie Miyahira	25–23, 12–21, 15–21	(silver) Runner-up
2026	Dominican International	(Dominican Republic) Clarisa Pie	(Dominican Republic) Alissa Acosta (Dominican Republic) Daniela Acosta	16–21, 13–21	(silver) Runner-up

Mixed doubles
Year	Tournament	Partner	Opponent	Score	Result
2016	Santo Domingo Open	(Dominican Republic) César Brito	(Dominican Republic) William Cabrera (Dominican Republic) Licelott Sánchez	10–21, 17–21	(silver) Runner-up
2018	Dominican Open	(Dominican Republic) Nelson Javier	(Dominican Republic) William Cabrera (Dominican Republic) Bermary Polanco	21–18, 21–23, 21–19	(gold) Winner
2026	Giraldilla International	(Dominican Republic) Yonatan Linarez	(Cuba) Roberto Herrera (Cuba) Taymara Oropesa	24–26, 14–21	(silver) Runner-up
2026	Dominican International	(Dominican Republic) Yonatan Linarez	(Argentina) Nicolas Oliva (Argentina) Ailén Oliva	21–19, 21–19	(gold) Winner

BWF International Challenge tournament
BWF International Series tournament
BWF Future Series tournament
