= Licelott Sánchez =

Dominican Republic badminton player (born 1995)

Personal information
- Born: Arianna Licelott Sánchez Matos; 29 November 1995 (age 30)

Sport
- Country: Dominican Republic
- Sport: Badminton

Women's singles & doubles
- Highest ranking: 211 (WS 18 February 2015); 129 (WD 10 July 2014); 270 (XD 17 July 2014)
- BWF profile

Arianna Licelott Sánchez Matos (born 29 November 1995) is a Dominican Republic badminton player.

== Achievements ==
=== BWF International Challenge/Series ===
Women's doubles
| Year | Tournament | Partner | Opponent | Score | Result |
|---|---|---|---|---|---|
| 2015 | Santo Domingo Open | (Dominican Republic) Nairoby Jiménez | (Peru) Katherine Winder (Peru) Luz María Zornoza | 15–21, 6–21 | (silver) Runner-up |
| 2015 | Carebaco International | (Dominican Republic) Daigenis Saturria | (Trinidad and Tobago) Leanna Castanada (Trinidad and Tobago) Avril Plaza Marcelle | 21–10, 21–13 | (gold) Winner |
| 2017 | Carebaco International | (Dominican Republic) Nairoby Jiménez | (Peru) Daniela Macías (Peru) Dánica Nishimura | 19–21, 12–21 | (gold) Winner |
| 2017 | Santo Domingo Open | (Dominican Republic) Nairoby Jiménez | (Dominican Republic) Noemi Almonte (Dominican Republic) Bermary Polanco | 26–24, 21–16 | (gold) Winner |

Mixed doubles
| Year | Tournament | Partner | Opponent | Score | Result |
|---|---|---|---|---|---|
| 2016 | Santo Domingo Open | (Dominican Republic) William Cabrera | (Dominican Republic) César Brito (Dominican Republic) Nairoby Jiménez | 21–10, 21–17 | (gold) Winner |

BWF International Challenge tournament
BWF International Series tournament
BWF Future Series tournament
