= Etilson Martínez =

Colombian football player (born 2000)

Etilso Martínez
Personal information
- Full name: Etilson José Martínez Palacio
- Date of birth: 12 May 2000 (age 26)
- Place of birth: Barranquilla, Colombia
- Height: 1.79 m (5 ft 10 in)
- Position: Midfielder

Team information
- Current team: Real Cartagena

Youth career
- –2016: Bogotá
- 2017–2018: Patriotas Boyacá

Senior career*
Years	Team	Apps	(Gls)
2016	Bogotá	9	(0)
2018	Patriotas Boyacá	0	(0)
2019	Llaneros	23	(2)
2020–	Real Cartagena	16	(0)

International career^{‡}
2017	Colombia U17	4	(0)
- * Club domestic league appearances and goals as of 16:53, 10 February 2021 (UTC) ‡ National team caps and goals as of 16:53, 15 December 2019 (UTC)

Etilson José Martínez Palacio (born 12 May 2000) is a Colombian footballer who currently plays as a midfielder for Real Cartagena.

== Career statistics ==
=== Club ===
As of 15 December 2019.

Club	Season	League			Cup		Other		Total	
Club	Season	Division	Apps	Goals	Apps	Goals	Apps	Goals	Apps	Goals
Barranquilla	2016	Categoría Primera B	9	0	2 (Note: Appearances in the Copa Colombia)	0	0	0	11	0
Patriotas Boyacá	2018	Categoría Primera A	0	0	2	0	0	0	2	0
Llaneros	2019	Categoría Primera B	23	2	2	0	0	0	25	2
Real Cartagena	2020	Categoría Primera B	12	0	3	0	0	0	15	0
Real Cartagena	2021	Categoría Primera B	4	0	0	0	0	0	4	0
Real Cartagena	Total		16	0	3	0	0	0	19	0
Career total			48	2	9	0	0	0	57	2
