= Junior Alberto Moreno =

Venezuelan footballer (born 2000)

Junior Moreno
Personal information
- Full name: Junior Alberto Moreno Paredes
- Date of birth: 3 March 2000 (age 26)
- Place of birth: Valera, Venezuela
- Height: 1.79 m (5 ft 10 in)
- Position: Defender

Team information
- Current team: Portuguesa
- Number: 13

Youth career
- –2017: Trujillanos

Senior career*
Years	Team	Apps	(Gls)
2017–2019	Trujillanos	69	(1)
2020–2021	Caracas	26	(0)
2022–2023	Inter de Barinas	29	(0)
2024–	Portuguesa	17	(0)

International career^{‡}
2017	Venezuela U17	3	(0)
- * Club domestic league appearances and goals as of 18:08, 4 July 2020 (UTC) ‡ National team caps and goals as of 18:15, 5 June 2017 (UTC)

Junior Alberto Moreno Paredes (born 3 March 2000) is a Venezuelan footballer who plays as a defender for Venezuelan Primera División side Portuguesa.

== Club career ==
Moreno made his senior professional debut on 8 May 2017, playing 90 minutes in a 2–2 draw with Zamora FC.

== Career statistics ==
=== Club ===
As of 1 June 2017

Club performance		League		Cup		Continental		Total	
Club	Season	Apps	Goals	Apps	Goals	Apps	Goals	Apps	Goals
Venezuela		Primera División		Copa Venezuela		Copa Libertadores		Total	
Trujillanos	2017	22	0	0	0	0	0	8	0
Total		23	0	0	0	0	0	8	0
Total	Venezuela	23	0	0	0	0	0	8	0
Total	Career total	23	0	0	0	0	0	8	0
