= Guillermo Tegue =

Colombian footballer (born 2000)

Personal information
- Full name: Guillermo Alejandro Tegue Caicedo
- Date of birth: 6 February 2000 (age 26)
- Place of birth: Santander de Quilichao, Colombia
- Height: 1.86 m (6 ft 1 in)
- Position: Defender

Team information
- Current team: Independiente Medellín
- Number: 24

Senior career*
Years	Team	Apps	(Gls)
2019–	Independiente Medellín	16	(0)

International career
2017	Colombia U17	3	(0)
- * Club domestic league appearances and goals as of 17:17, 25 October 2020 (UTC)

Guillermo Alejandro Tegue Caicedo (born 6 February 2000) is a Colombian footballer who currently plays as a defender for Independiente Medellín.

== Career statistics ==
=== Club ===
As of 15 December 2019.

Club	Season	League			Cup		Continental		Other		Total	
Club	Season	Division	Apps	Goals	Apps	Goals	Apps	Goals	Apps	Goals	Apps	Goals
Independiente Medellín	2019	Categoría Primera A	10	0	1 (Note: Appearances in the Copa Colombia)	0	0	0	0	0	11	0
Career total			10	0	1	0	0	0	0	0	11	0
