= Bermary Polanco =

Dominican Republic badminton player (born 1999)

Personal information
- Born: Bermary Altagracia Polanco Muñoz; 7 August 1999 (age 27)

Sport
- Country: Dominican Republic
- Sport: Badminton

Women's singles & doubles
- Highest ranking: 163 (WS 26 October 2017); 85 (WD with Nairoby Abigail Jiménez 20 August 2019) 136 (WD 2 November 2017); 210 (XD 28 April 2016)
- BWF profile

Bermary Altagracia Polanco Muñoz (born 7 August 1999) is a Dominican Republic badminton player She competed at the 2015 Pan American Games in Toronto, Canada.

== Achievements ==
=== BWF International Challenge/Series ===
Women's doubles
Year	Tournament	Partner	Opponent	Score	Result
2016	Carebaco International	(Dominican Republic) Nairoby Jiménez	(Jamaica) Mikaylia Haldane (Jamaica) Katherine Wynter	21–17, 21–23, 21–15	(gold) Winner
2016	Santo Domingo Open	(Dominican Republic) Nairoby Jiménez	(Dominican Republic) Fanny Duarte (Wales) Aimee Moran	21–8, 21–12	(gold) Winner
2017	Guatemala International	(Dominican Republic) Noemi Almonte	(Peru) Daniela Macías (Peru) Dánica Nishimura	12–21, 6–21	(silver) Runner-up
2017	Santo Domingo Open	(Dominican Republic) Noemi Almonte	(Dominican Republic) Nairoby Jiménez (Dominican Republic) Licelott Sánchez	24–26, 14–21	(silver) Runner-up
2018	Dominican Open	(Dominican Republic) Nairoby Jiménez	(Dominican Republic) Alisa Acosta (Dominican Republic) Kahina Vásquez	21–6, 21–10	(gold) Winner

Mixed doubles
Year	Tournament	Partner	Opponent	Score	Result
2018	Suriname International	(Dominican Republic) César Brito	(Suriname) Mitchel Wongsodikromo (Jamaica) Katherine Wynter	21–10, 21–16	(gold) Winner
2018	Dominican Open	(Dominican Republic) William Cabrera	(Dominican Republic) Nelson Javier (Dominican Republic) Nairoby Jiménez	18–21, 23–21, 19–21	(silver) Runner-up

BWF International Challenge tournament
BWF International Series tournament
BWF Future Series tournament
