= Alberto Raposo =

Dominican Republic badminton player (born 1987)

Personal information
- Born: Alberto Raposo Jiménez; 16 November 1987 (age 38)

Sport
- Country: Dominican Republic
- Sport: Badminton

Men's
- Highest ranking: 238 (MS) 10 April 2014; 93 (MD) 5 December 2013; 118 (XD) 24 April 2014
- BWF profile
Medal record
Badminton
Representing Dominican Republic
Pan American Championships
Bronze medal – third place	2013 Santo Domingo	Men's doubles

Alberto Raposo Jiménez (born 16 November 1987) is a Dominican Republic male badminton player. In 2011, he competed at the 2011 Pan American Games in Guadalajara, and in 2014 he also competed at the Central American and Caribbean Games in Veracruz, Mexico. He was the bronze medalist at the 2013 Pan Am Badminton Championships in the men's doubles event partnered with Nelson Javier.

== Achievements ==
=== Pan Am Championships ===
Men's Doubles
Year	Venue	Partner	Opponent	Score	Result
2013	Palacio de los Deportes Virgilio Travieso Soto; Santo Domingo, Dominican Republic	(Dominican Republic) Nelson Javier	(Canada) Adrian Liu (Canada) Derrick Ng	9-21, 10–21	Bronze

=== BWF International Challenge/Series ===
Men's Doubles
Year	Tournament	Partner	Opponent	Score	Result
2014	Santo Domingo Open	(Dominican Republic) Nelson Javier	(Dominican Republic) William Cabrera (Dominican Republic) Reimi Starling Cabrera	21–18, 24–26, 21–17	(gold) Winner
2014	Colombia International	(Dominican Republic) Nelson Javier	(Guatemala) Heymard Humblers (Guatemala) Adams Rodriguez	11-8, 10–11, 11–7, 6–11, 10–11	(silver) Runner-up
2013	Carebaco International	(Dominican Republic) Nelson Javier	(Jamaica) Gareth Henry (United States) Bjorn Seguin	19-21, 17–21	(silver) Runner-up
2013	Guatemala International	(Dominican Republic) Nelson Javier	(Guatemala) Solis Jonathan (Guatemala) Rodolfo Ramirez	13-21, 18–21	(silver) Runner-up
2011	Carebaco International	(Dominican Republic) Nelson Javier	(Suriname) Virgil Soeroredjo (Suriname) Mitchel Wongsodikromo	20-22, 18–21	(silver) Runner-up

BWF International Challenge tournament
BWF International Series tournament
BWF Future Series tournament
