= Gustavo Carvajal =

Colombian footballer (born 2000)

Personal information
- Full name: Gustavo Adolfo Carvajal Gómez
- Date of birth: 17 June 2000 (age 26)
- Place of birth: Padilla, Colombia
- Height: 1.78 m (5 ft 10 in)
- Position: Midfielder

Youth career
- América de Cali

Senior career*
Years	Team	Apps	(Gls)
2018–2023	América de Cali	24	(0)
2020–2021	→ Levante B (loan)	19	(0)
2023	Cúcuta Deportivo	3	(0)

International career^{‡}
2017	Colombia U17	2	(0)
2019	Colombia U20	7	(0)
- * Club domestic league appearances and goals as of 11 November 2023 ‡ National team caps and goals as of 2 June 2019

Gustavo Carvajal (born 17 June 2000) is a Colombian football player who plays as midfielder.

A native of Cauca Department, Carvajal began playing club football with América de Cali. Former goalkeeping coach Otoniel Quintana brought Carvajal to América. He made his competitive debut for the club in February 2018, before joining Levante UD's B team on loan in July 2020.
