= William Cabrera =

Dominican Republic badminton player (born 1992)

Personal information
- Born: William Cabrera José; 16 October 1992 (age 34)
- Height: 1.89 m (6 ft 2 in)
- Weight: 89 kg (196 lb)

Sport
- Country: Dominican Republic
- Sport: Badminton

Men's singles & doubles
- Highest ranking: 141 (MS 28 November 2013); 86 (MD 28 January 2016); 83 (XD 21 November 2013)
- BWF profile
Medal record
Men's badminton
Representing Dominican Republic
Pan American Games
Bronze medal – third place	2015 Toronto	Men's doubles

William Cabrera José (Note: In this Spanish name, the first or paternal surname is Cabrera and the second or maternal family name is José.) (also spelled Willian, born 16 October 1992) is a Dominican Republic badminton player. He was the bronze medalist at the XVII Pan American Games in the men's doubles event. Cabrera also competed in three consecutive Central American and Caribbean Games in 2010, 2014, and 2018.

== Achievements ==
=== Pan American Games ===
Men's doubles
Year	Venue	Partner	Opponent	Score	Result
2015	Atos Markham Pan Am Centre; Toronto, Canada	(Dominican Republic) Nelson Javier	(Brazil) Hugo Arthuso (Brazil) Daniel Paiola	13–21, 21–23	Bronze

=== BWF International Challenge/Series ===
Men's singles
Year	Tournament	Opponent	Score	Result
2015	Carebaco International	(Jamaica) Gareth Henry	8–21, 6–21	(silver) Runner-up

Men's doubles
Year	Tournament	Partner	Opponent	Score	Result
2012	Giraldilla International	(Dominican Republic) Freddy López	(Cuba) Ernesto Reyes (Cuba) Ronald Toledo	16–21, 21–23	(silver) Runner-up
2012	Carebaco International	(Dominican Republic) Freddy López	(Guatemala) Rodolfo Ramírez (Guatemala) Jonathan Solís	21–17, 7–21, 9–21	(silver) Runner-up
2012	Miami International	(Dominican Republic) Nelson Javier	(France) Laurent Constantin (France) Florent Riancho	7–21, 16–21	(silver) Runner-up
2014	Santo Domingo Open	(Dominican Republic) Reimi Cabrera	(Dominican Republic) Nelson Javier (Dominican Republic) Alberto Raposo	18–21, 26–24, 17–21	(silver) Runner-up
2016	Santo Domingo Open	(Dominican Republic) Nelson Javier	(Italy) Lukas Osele (Italy) Kevin Strobl	21–16, 21–15	(gold) Winner
2018	Dominican Open	(Dominican Republic) Nelson Javier	(Mexico) Job Castillo (Mexico) Luis Montoya	18–21, 18–21	(silver) Runner-up

Mixed doubles
Year	Tournament	Partner	Opponent	Score	Result
2016	Santo Domingo Open	(Dominican Republic) Licelott Sánchez	(Dominican Republic) César Brito (Dominican Republic) Nairoby Jiménez	21–10, 21–17	(gold) Winner
2018	Dominican Open	(Dominican Republic) Bermary Polanco	(Dominican Republic) Nelson Javier (Dominican Republic) Nairoby Jiménez	18–21, 23–21, 19–21	(silver) Runner-up

BWF International Challenge tournament
BWF International Series tournament
BWF Future Series tournament
