= Nelson Javier =

Dominican Republic badminton player

Personal information
- Born: Nelson Javier Ozuna; 19 January 1985 (age 41)
- Years active: 1999 - 2000
- Height: 1.80 m (5 ft 11 in)
- Weight: 61 kg (134 lb)

Sport
- Country: Dominican Republic
- Sport: Badminton

Men's singles & doubles
- Highest ranking: 165 (MS 3 September 2015); 86 (MD 28 January 2016); 74 (XD 26 Feb 2015)
- BWF profile
Medal record
Men's badminton
Representing Dominican Republic
Pan American Games
Bronze medal – third place	2015 Toronto	Men's doubles
Pan American Championships
Bronze medal – third place	2013 Santo Domingo	Men's doubles
Central American and Caribbean Games
Bronze medal – third place	2018 Barranquilla	Mixed doubles

Nelson Javier Ozuna (Note: In this Spanish name, the first or paternal surname is Javier and the second or maternal family name is Ozuna.) (born 19 January 1985) is a Dominican Republic badminton player.

== Career ==
In 2013, he became the runner-up of the Guatemala International tournament in mixed doubles event. In 2015, he won bronze medal at the XVII Pan American Games in men's doubles event.

== Achievements ==
=== Pan American Games ===
Men's doubles
Year	Venue	Partner	Opponent	Score	Result
2015	Atos Markham Pan Am Centre; Toronto, Canada	(Dominican Republic) William Cabrera	(Brazil) Hugo Arthuso (Brazil) Daniel Paiola	13–21, 21–23	Bronze

=== Pan Am Championships ===
Men's doubles
Year	Venue	Partner	Opponent	Score	Result
2013	Palacio de los Deportes Virgilio Travieso Soto; Santo Domingo, Dominican Republic	(Dominican Republic) Alberto Raposo	(Canada) Adrian Liu (Canada) Derrick Ng	9–21, 10–21	Bronze

=== Central American and Caribbean Games ===
Mixed doubles
Year	Venue	Partner	Opponent	Score	Result
2018	Coliseo Universidad del Norte; Barranquilla, Colombia	(Dominican Republic) Nairoby Jiménez	(Cuba) Leodannis Martínez (Cuba) Taymara Oropesa	21–14, 10–21, 20–22	Bronze

=== BWF International Challenge/Series ===
Men's singles
Year	Tournament	Opponent	Score	Result
2016	Carebaco International	(Suriname) Sören Opti	21–17, 13–21, 21–7	(gold) Winner

Men's doubles
Year	Tournament	Partner	Opponent	Score	Result
2011	Carebaco International	(Dominican Republic) Alberto Raposo	(Suriname) Virgil Soeroredjo (Suriname) Mitchel Wongsodikromo	20–22, 18–21	(silver) Runner-up
2013	Miami International	(Dominican Republic) William Cabrera	(France) Laurent Constantin (France) Florent Riancho	7–21, 16–21	(silver) Runner-up
2013	Giraldilla International	(Dominican Republic) Freddy López	(Czech Republic) Jan Fröhlich (Czech Republic) Zdeněk Sváta	8–21, 14–21	(silver) Runner-up
2013	Guatemala International	(Dominican Republic) Alberto Raposo	(Guatemala) Rodolfo Ramírez (Guatemala) Jonathan Solís	13–21, 18–21	(silver) Runner-up
2013	Carebaco International	(Dominican Republic) Alberto Raposo	(Jamaica) Gareth Henry (United States) Bjorn Seguin	19–21, 17–21	(silver) Runner-up
2014	Colombia International	(Dominican Republic) Alberto Raposo	(Guatemala) Heymard Humblers (Guatemala) Adams Rodriguez	11–8, 10–11, 11–7, 6–11, 10–11	(silver) Runner-up
2014	Santo Domingo Open	(Dominican Republic) Alberto Raposo	(Dominican Republic) William Cabrera (Dominican Republic) Reimi Cabrera	21–18, 24–26, 21–17	(gold) Winner
2016	Santo Domingo Open	(Dominican Republic) William Cabrera	(Italy) Lukas Osele (Italy) Kevin Strobl	21–16, 21–15	(gold) Winner
2018	Dominican Open	(Dominican Republic) William Cabrera	(Mexico) Job Castillo (Mexico) Luis Montoya	18–21, 18–21	(silver) Runner-up

Mixed doubles
Year	Tournament	Partner	Opponent	Score	Result
2012	Carebaco International	(Dominican Republic) Berónica Vibieca	(Suriname) Mitchel Wongsodikromo (Suriname) Crystal Leefmans	11–21, 21–17, 21–13	(gold) Winner
2013	Giraldilla International	(Dominican Republic) Berónica Vibieca	(Mexico) Lino Muñoz (Mexico) Cynthia González	19–21, 27–25, 12–21	(silver) Runner-up
2013	Venezuela International	(Dominican Republic) Berónica Vibieca	(Guatemala) Heymard Humblers (Guatemala) Nikté Sotomayor	20–22, 21–17, 18–21	(silver) Runner-up
2013	Guatemala International	(Dominican Republic) Berónica Vibieca	(Guatemala) Jonathan Solís (Guatemala) Nikté Sotomayor	11–21, 21–19, 19–21	(silver) Runner-up
2014	Santo Domingo Open	(Dominican Republic) Berónica Vibieca	(Austria) David Obernosterer (Austria) Elisabeth Baldauf	17–21, 15–21	(silver) Runner-up
2014	Puerto Rico International	(Dominican Republic) Berónica Vibieca	(Peru) Andrés Corpancho (Peru) Luz María Zornoza	19–21, 16–21	(silver) Runner-up
2015	Carebaco International	(Dominican Republic) Daigenis Saturria	(Jamaica) Gareth Henry (Jamaica) Katherine Wynter	21–17, 21–19	(gold) Winner
2016	Carebaco International	(Dominican Republic) Noemi Almonte	(Barbados) Dakeil Thorpe (Barbados) Tamisha Williams	10–21, 18–21	(silver) Runner-up
2018	Dominican Open	(Dominican Republic) Nairoby Abigail Jiménez	(Dominican Republic) William Cabrera (Dominican Republic) Bermary Polanco	21–18, 21–23, 21–19	(gold) Winner

BWF International Challenge tournament
BWF International Series tournament
BWF Future Series tournament
