= Santo Domingo Open (badminton) =

Badminton tournament

The Santo Domingo Open or Santo Domingo International is an open badminton tournament held in Santo Domingo, Dominican Republic. The tournament has been an International Series level since 2003, but in 2013 categorized as a Future Series level from Badminton World Federation. Another tournament, Dominican Open is a Future Series level since 2018.

== Previous winners ==
=== Santo Domingo Open ===
Year	Men's singles	Women's singles	Men's doubles	Women's doubles	Mixed doubles
2003	(Germany) Jens Roch	(Japan) Miyo Akao	(France) Vincent Laigle (France) Svetoslav Stoyanov	(Canada) Helen Nichol (Canada) Charmaine Reid	(Spain) José Antonio Crespo (Spain) Dolores Marco
2004– 2008	No competition				
2009	(Guatemala) Kevin Cordón	(Slovenia) Maja Tvrdy	(Guatemala) Kevin Cordón (Guatemala) Rodolfo Ramírez	(Peru) Christina Aicardi (Peru) Claudia Rivero	(Peru) Mario Cuba (Peru) Katherine Winder
2010	(Portugal) Pedro Martins	(Portugal) Telma Santos	(Guatemala) Kevin Cordón (Guatemala) Rodolfo Ramírez	(Germany) Nicole Grether (Canada) Charmaine Reid	(Canada) Toby Ng (Canada) Grace Gao
2011	(Canada) Stephan Wojcikiewicz	(Greece) Anne Hald Jensen	(Jamaica) Gareth Henry (Jamaica) Charles Pyne	(Greece) Anne Hald Jensen (France) Barbara Matias	(Spain) José Vicente Martínez (Spain) Sandra Chirlaque
2012	No competition				
2013	(Cuba) Osleni Guerrero	(United States) Iris Wang	(Jamaica) Gareth Henry (Jamaica) Samuel Ricketts	(Brazil) Paula Pereira (Brazil) Lohaynny Vicente	(Brazil) Alex Yuwan Tjong (Brazil) Lohaynny Vicente
2014	(Austria) David Obernosterer	(Austria) Elisabeth Baldauf	(Dominican Republic) Nelson Javier (Dominican Republic) Alberto Raposo	(Peru) Daniela Macías (Peru) Dánica Nishimura	(Austria) David Obernosterer (Austria) Elisabeth Baldauf
2015	(Austria) David Obernosterer	(Austria) Elisabeth Baldauf	(Mexico) Job Castillo (Mexico) Lino Muñoz	(Peru) Katherine Winder (Peru) Luz María Zornoza	(Austria) David Obernosterer (Austria) Elisabeth Baldauf
2016	(Italy) Matteo Bellucci	(Dominican Republic) Nairoby Jiménez	(Dominican Republic) William Cabrera (Dominican Republic) Nelson Javier	(Dominican Republic) Nairoby Jiménez (Dominican Republic) Bermary Polanco	(Dominican Republic) William Cabrera (Dominican Republic) Licelott Sánchez
2017	(Cuba) Osleni Guerrero	(United States) Jamie Hsu	(Cuba) Osleni Guerrero (Cuba) Leodannis Martínez	(Dominican Republic) Nairoby Jiménez (Dominican Republic) Licelott Sánchez	(Cuba) Leodannis Martínez (Cuba) Tahimara Oropeza
2018	(Cuba) Osleni Guerrero	(Brazil) Fabiana Silva	(Canada) Joshua Hurlburt-Yu (Canada) Duncan Yao	(Brazil) Lohaynny Vicente (Brazil) Luana Vicente	(Canada) Joshua Hurlburt-Yu (Canada) Josephine Wu
2019	(Canada) Brian Yang	(Brazil) Fabiana Silva	(Cuba) Osleni Guerrero (Cuba) Leodannis Martínez	(Brazil) Jaqueline Lima (Brazil) Sâmia Lima	(Brazil) Fabrício Farias (Brazil) Jaqueline Lima
2020	Cancelled (Note: This tournament, originally to be played from 27 to 31 October, was later cancelled due to the COVID-19 pandemic in the Dominican Republic.)				
2021	(Guatemala) Rubén Castellanos	(Guatemala) Nikté Sotomayor	(Guatemala) Aníbal Marroquín (Guatemala) Jonathan Solís	(Guatemala) Diana Corleto (Guatemala) Nikté Sotomayor	(Mexico) Luis Montoya (Mexico) Vanessa Villalobos
2022	(Israel) Misha Zilberman	(Italy) Yasmine Hamza	(Japan) Ayato Endo (Japan) Yuta Takei	(Brazil) Sânia Lima (Brazil) Tamires Santos	(Japan) Sumiya Nihei (Japan) Minami Asakura
2023	(Brazil) Jonathan Matias	(Brazil) Juliana Viana Vieira	(Mexico) Job Castillo (Mexico) Luis Montoya	(Brazil) Sânia Lima (Brazil) Juliana Viana Vieira	(Algeria) Koceila Mammeri (Algeria) Tanina Mammeri
2024	Cancelled				
2025	(Brazil) Jonathan Matias	(United States) Ella Lin	(Canada) Clarence Chau (Canada) Wong Yan Kit	(Dominican Republic) Clarisa Pie (Dominican Republic) Nairoby Abigail Jiménez	(United States) Adrian Mar (United States) Ella Lin
2026	(Germany) Matthias Kicklitz	(Japan) Nayu Shirakawa	(Brazil) Izak Batalha (Brazil) Matheus Voigt	(Chinese Taipei) Hsieh Chih-ying (Chinese Taipei) Lee Yu-hsuan	(Germany) Justin Seibel (Germany) Miranda Wilson

=== Dominican International ===
Year	Men's singles	Women's singles	Men's doubles	Women's doubles	Mixed doubles
2018	(Mexico) Job Castillo	(Mexico) Sabrina Solís	(Mexico) Job Castillo (Mexico) Luis Montoya	(Dominican Republic) Nairoby Abigail Jiménez (Dominican Republic) Bermary Polanco	(Dominican Republic) Nelson Javier (Dominican Republic) Nairoby Abigail Jiménez
2019	Cancelled				
2020	No competition				
2021	(Brazil) Jonathan Matias	(Brazil) Juliana Viana Vieira	(Brazil) Fabrício Farias (Brazil) Francielton Farias	(Brazil) Jaqueline Lima (Brazil) Sâmia Lima	(Brazil) Fabrício Farias (Brazil) Jaqueline Lima
2022	Cancelled (Note: This tournament, originally to be played from 25 to 28 October, was later postponed due to COVID-19 pandemic in the Dominican Republic.)				
2023	Cancelled				
2024– 2025	No competition				
2026	(United States) Jay Chun	(Switzerland) Jenjira Stadelmann	(Argentina) Nicolas Oliva (Argentina) Santiago Otero	(Dominican Republic) Alissa Acosta (Dominican Republic) Daniela Acosta	(Dominican Republic) Yonatan Linarez (Dominican Republic) Nairoby Abigail Jiménez

== Performances by nation ==
=== Santo Domingo Open ===
As of the 2026 edition

Pos	Nation	MS	WS	MD	WD	XD	Total
1	Brazil	2	3	1	5	2	13
2	Canada	2	0	2	1.5	2	7.5
3	Dominican Republic*	0	1	2	3	1	7
3	Guatemala	2	1	3	1	0	7
5	Austria	2	2	0	0	2	6
5	Cuba	3	0	2	0	1	6
7	Japan	0	2	1	0	1	4
7	Peru	0	0	0	3	1	4
7	United States	0	3	0	0	1	4
10	Germany	2	0	0	0.5	1	3.5
11	Mexico	0	0	2	0	1	3
12	Italy	1	1	0	0	0	2
12	Jamaica	0	0	2	0	0	2
12	Portugal	1	1	0	0	0	2
12	Spain	0	0	0	0	2	2
16	France	0	0	1	0.5	0	1.5
16	Greece	0	1	0	0.5	0	1.5
18	Algeria	0	0	0	0	1	1
18	Chinese Taipei	0	0	0	1	0	1
18	Israel	1	0	0	0	0	1
18	Slovenia	0	1	0	0	0	1
Total		16	16	16	16	16	80

* Host nation

=== Dominican International ===
As of the 2026 edition

No	Nation	MS	WS	MD	WD	XD	Total
1	Brazil	1	1	1	1	1	5
2	Dominican Republic*	0	0	0	2	2	4
3	Mexico	1	1	1	0	0	3
4	Argentina	0	0	1	0	0	1
4	Switzerland	0	1	0	0	0	1
4	United States	1	0	0	0	0	1
Total		3	3	3	3	3	15

* Host nation
