= 2017 BWF season =

Badminton World Federation circuit

Details
- Duration: 10 January – 24 December
- Edition: 78th

Achievements (singles)

Awards
- Player of the year: (Indonesia) Marcus Fernaldi Gideon &; (Indonesia) Kevin Sanjaya Sukamuljo; (Male) (China) Chen Qingchen (Female)

The 2017 BWF season was the overall badminton circuit organized by the Badminton World Federation (BWF) for the 2017 badminton season to publish and promote the sport. Besides the BWF World Championships, BWF promoted the sport of badminton through an extensive worldwide program of events. These events had various purposes according to their level and territory in which they were held but those events owned by BWF seek to showcase the sport via the widest possible quality television broadcast and build the fanbase of the sport throughout the world.

The world badminton tournament structure had four levels: Level 1 (BWF Major Events), Level 2 (BWF Superseries: Superseries and Superseries Premier), Level 3 (BWF Grand Prix: Grand Prix and Grand Prix Gold Series), and Level 4 (BWF International Challenge, BWF International Series, and BWF Future Series). The Thomas Cup & Uber Cup, Sudirman Cup and Suhandinata Cup were Teams Events. The others – Superseries, Grand Prix Events, International Challenge, International Series, and Future Series were all individual tournaments. The higher the level of tournament, the larger the prize money and the more ranking points available.

The 2017 BWF season calendar comprised these four levels of BWF tournaments.

== Schedule ==
This is the complete schedule of events on the 2017 calendar, with the Champions and Runners-up documented.

Key

World Championships
Superseries Finals
Superseries Premier
Superseries
Grand Prix Gold
Grand Prix
International Challenge
International Series
Future Series
Team events

=== January ===
Week of	Tournament	Champions	Runners-up
January 9	China International: Host: Lingshui, China; Level: International Challenge; Prize: $50,000; Format: 32MS/32WS/32MD/32WD/32XD	(China) Sun Feixiang	(China) Zhao Junpeng
January 9	China International: Host: Lingshui, China; Level: International Challenge; Prize: $50,000; Format: 32MS/32WS/32MD/32WD/32XD	Score: 11–9, 11–7, 13–11	
January 9	China International: Host: Lingshui, China; Level: International Challenge; Prize: $50,000; Format: 32MS/32WS/32MD/32WD/32XD	(China) Cai Yanyan	(China) Wang Zhiyi
January 9	China International: Host: Lingshui, China; Level: International Challenge; Prize: $50,000; Format: 32MS/32WS/32MD/32WD/32XD	Score: 11–9, 10–13, 11–9, 11–7	
January 9	China International: Host: Lingshui, China; Level: International Challenge; Prize: $50,000; Format: 32MS/32WS/32MD/32WD/32XD	(Indonesia) Mohammad Ahsan (Indonesia) Rian Agung Saputro	(Thailand) Trawut Potieng (Thailand) Nanthakarn Yordphaisong
January 9	China International: Host: Lingshui, China; Level: International Challenge; Prize: $50,000; Format: 32MS/32WS/32MD/32WD/32XD	Score: 8–11, 11–7, 11–4, 11–7	
January 9	China International: Host: Lingshui, China; Level: International Challenge; Prize: $50,000; Format: 32MS/32WS/32MD/32WD/32XD	(China) Du Yue (China) Xu Ya	(China) Chen Lu (China) Zhou Chaomin
January 9	China International: Host: Lingshui, China; Level: International Challenge; Prize: $50,000; Format: 32MS/32WS/32MD/32WD/32XD	Score: 9–11, 11–8, 9–11, 11–8, 11–5	
January 9	China International: Host: Lingshui, China; Level: International Challenge; Prize: $50,000; Format: 32MS/32WS/32MD/32WD/32XD	(Japan) Tomoya Takashina (Japan) Rie Etoh	(China) Tan Qiang (China) Xu Ya
January 9	China International: Host: Lingshui, China; Level: International Challenge; Prize: $50,000; Format: 32MS/32WS/32MD/32WD/32XD	Score: 11–7, 11–5, 13–11	
January 9	Estonian International: Host: Tallinn, Estonia; Level: International Series; Prize: $8,000; Format: 32MS/32WS/32MD/32WD/32XD	(Estonia) Raul Must	(England) Toby Penty
January 9	Estonian International: Host: Tallinn, Estonia; Level: International Series; Prize: $8,000; Format: 32MS/32WS/32MD/32WD/32XD	Score: 16–21, 24–22, 21–13	
January 9	Estonian International: Host: Tallinn, Estonia; Level: International Series; Prize: $8,000; Format: 32MS/32WS/32MD/32WD/32XD	(France) Delphine Lansac	(Russia) Ksenia Polikarpova
January 9	Estonian International: Host: Tallinn, Estonia; Level: International Series; Prize: $8,000; Format: 32MS/32WS/32MD/32WD/32XD	Score: 21–15, 21–14	
January 9	Estonian International: Host: Tallinn, Estonia; Level: International Series; Prize: $8,000; Format: 32MS/32WS/32MD/32WD/32XD	(France) Bastian Kersaudy (France) Julien Maio	(Finland) Henri Aarnio (Finland) Iikka Heino
January 9	Estonian International: Host: Tallinn, Estonia; Level: International Series; Prize: $8,000; Format: 32MS/32WS/32MD/32WD/32XD	Score: 21–13, 21–14	
January 9	Estonian International: Host: Tallinn, Estonia; Level: International Series; Prize: $8,000; Format: 32MS/32WS/32MD/32WD/32XD	(Bulgaria) Mariya Mitsova (Bulgaria) Petya Nedelcheva	(France) Delphine Delrue (France) Léa Palermo
January 9	Estonian International: Host: Tallinn, Estonia; Level: International Series; Prize: $8,000; Format: 32MS/32WS/32MD/32WD/32XD	Score: 21–12, 21–16	
January 9	Estonian International: Host: Tallinn, Estonia; Level: International Series; Prize: $8,000; Format: 32MS/32WS/32MD/32WD/32XD	(Russia) Rodion Alimov (Russia) Alina Davletova	(Russia) Anatoliy Yartsev (Russia) Evgeniya Kosetskaya
January 9	Estonian International: Host: Tallinn, Estonia; Level: International Series; Prize: $8,000; Format: 32MS/32WS/32MD/32WD/32XD	Score: 21–8, 21–19	
January 16	Malaysia Masters (Draw): Host: Sibu, Sarawak, Malaysia; Level: Grand Prix Gold; Prize: $120,000; Format: 64MS/32WS/32MD/32WD/32XD	(Hong Kong) Ng Ka Long	(South Korea) Lee Hyun-il
January 16	Malaysia Masters (Draw): Host: Sibu, Sarawak, Malaysia; Level: Grand Prix Gold; Prize: $120,000; Format: 64MS/32WS/32MD/32WD/32XD	Score: 14–21, 21–15, 10–9 (retired)	
January 16	Malaysia Masters (Draw): Host: Sibu, Sarawak, Malaysia; Level: Grand Prix Gold; Prize: $120,000; Format: 64MS/32WS/32MD/32WD/32XD	(India) Saina Nehwal	(Thailand) Pornpawee Chochuwong
January 16	Malaysia Masters (Draw): Host: Sibu, Sarawak, Malaysia; Level: Grand Prix Gold; Prize: $120,000; Format: 64MS/32WS/32MD/32WD/32XD	Score: 22–20, 22–20	
January 16	Malaysia Masters (Draw): Host: Sibu, Sarawak, Malaysia; Level: Grand Prix Gold; Prize: $120,000; Format: 64MS/32WS/32MD/32WD/32XD	(Indonesia) Berry Angriawan (Indonesia) Hardianto	(Malaysia) Goh Sze Fei (Malaysia) Nur Izzuddin
January 16	Malaysia Masters (Draw): Host: Sibu, Sarawak, Malaysia; Level: Grand Prix Gold; Prize: $120,000; Format: 64MS/32WS/32MD/32WD/32XD	Score: 21–19, 21–12	
January 16	Malaysia Masters (Draw): Host: Sibu, Sarawak, Malaysia; Level: Grand Prix Gold; Prize: $120,000; Format: 64MS/32WS/32MD/32WD/32XD	(Thailand) Jongkolphan Kititharakul (Thailand) Rawinda Prajongjai	(Hong Kong) Poon Lok Yan (Hong Kong) Tse Ying Suet
January 16	Malaysia Masters (Draw): Host: Sibu, Sarawak, Malaysia; Level: Grand Prix Gold; Prize: $120,000; Format: 64MS/32WS/32MD/32WD/32XD	Score: 21–17, 21–9	
January 16	Malaysia Masters (Draw): Host: Sibu, Sarawak, Malaysia; Level: Grand Prix Gold; Prize: $120,000; Format: 64MS/32WS/32MD/32WD/32XD	(Malaysia) Tan Kian Meng (Malaysia) Lai Pei Jing	(Malaysia) Goh Soon Huat (Malaysia) Shevon Jamie Lai
January 16	Malaysia Masters (Draw): Host: Sibu, Sarawak, Malaysia; Level: Grand Prix Gold; Prize: $120,000; Format: 64MS/32WS/32MD/32WD/32XD	Score: 21–17, 21–9	
January 16	Swedish Masters: Host: Lund, Sweden; Level: International Series; Prize: $8,000; Format: 32MS/32WS/32MD/32WD/32XD	(England) Toby Penty	(Indonesia) Setyaldi Putra Wibowo
January 16	Swedish Masters: Host: Lund, Sweden; Level: International Series; Prize: $8,000; Format: 32MS/32WS/32MD/32WD/32XD	Score: 21–12, 21–11	
January 16	Swedish Masters: Host: Lund, Sweden; Level: International Series; Prize: $8,000; Format: 32MS/32WS/32MD/32WD/32XD	(Denmark) Mia Blichfeldt	(Denmark) Sofie Holmboe Dahl
January 16	Swedish Masters: Host: Lund, Sweden; Level: International Series; Prize: $8,000; Format: 32MS/32WS/32MD/32WD/32XD	Score: 21–19, 21–16	
January 16	Swedish Masters: Host: Lund, Sweden; Level: International Series; Prize: $8,000; Format: 32MS/32WS/32MD/32WD/32XD	(Russia) Konstantin Abramov (Russia) Alexandr Zinchenko	(Sweden) Richard Eidestedt (Sweden) Nico Ruponen
January 16	Swedish Masters: Host: Lund, Sweden; Level: International Series; Prize: $8,000; Format: 32MS/32WS/32MD/32WD/32XD	Score: 21–17, 22–20	
January 16	Swedish Masters: Host: Lund, Sweden; Level: International Series; Prize: $8,000; Format: 32MS/32WS/32MD/32WD/32XD	(Sweden) Clara Nistad (Sweden) Emma Wengberg	(Denmark) Alexandra Bøje (Denmark) Lena Grebak
January 16	Swedish Masters: Host: Lund, Sweden; Level: International Series; Prize: $8,000; Format: 32MS/32WS/32MD/32WD/32XD	Score: 21–17, 24–22	
January 16	Swedish Masters: Host: Lund, Sweden; Level: International Series; Prize: $8,000; Format: 32MS/32WS/32MD/32WD/32XD	(Denmark) Mikkel Mikkelsen (Denmark) Mai Surrow	(Denmark) Mathias Bay-Smidt (Denmark) Alexandra Bøje
January 16	Swedish Masters: Host: Lund, Sweden; Level: International Series; Prize: $8,000; Format: 32MS/32WS/32MD/32WD/32XD	Score: 21–18, 21–14	
January 23	Syed Modi International (Draw): Host: Lucknow, India; Level: Grand Prix Gold; Prize: $120,000; Format: 64MS/32WS/32MD/32WD/32XD	(India) Sameer Verma	(India) B. Sai Praneeth
January 23	Syed Modi International (Draw): Host: Lucknow, India; Level: Grand Prix Gold; Prize: $120,000; Format: 64MS/32WS/32MD/32WD/32XD	Score: 21–19, 21–16	
January 23	Syed Modi International (Draw): Host: Lucknow, India; Level: Grand Prix Gold; Prize: $120,000; Format: 64MS/32WS/32MD/32WD/32XD	(India) P. V. Sindhu	(Indonesia) Gregoria Mariska
January 23	Syed Modi International (Draw): Host: Lucknow, India; Level: Grand Prix Gold; Prize: $120,000; Format: 64MS/32WS/32MD/32WD/32XD	Score: 21–13, 21–14	
January 23	Syed Modi International (Draw): Host: Lucknow, India; Level: Grand Prix Gold; Prize: $120,000; Format: 64MS/32WS/32MD/32WD/32XD	(Denmark) Mathias Boe (Denmark) Carsten Mogensen	(Chinese Taipei) Lu Ching-yao (Chinese Taipei) Yang Po-han
January 23	Syed Modi International (Draw): Host: Lucknow, India; Level: Grand Prix Gold; Prize: $120,000; Format: 64MS/32WS/32MD/32WD/32XD	Score: 21–14, 21–15	
January 23	Syed Modi International (Draw): Host: Lucknow, India; Level: Grand Prix Gold; Prize: $120,000; Format: 64MS/32WS/32MD/32WD/32XD	(Denmark) Kamilla Rytter Juhl (Denmark) Christinna Pedersen	(India) Ashwini Ponnappa (India) N. Sikki Reddy
January 23	Syed Modi International (Draw): Host: Lucknow, India; Level: Grand Prix Gold; Prize: $120,000; Format: 64MS/32WS/32MD/32WD/32XD	Score: 21–16, 21–18	
January 23	Syed Modi International (Draw): Host: Lucknow, India; Level: Grand Prix Gold; Prize: $120,000; Format: 64MS/32WS/32MD/32WD/32XD	(India) Pranaav Jerry Chopra (India) N. Sikki Reddy	(India) B. Sumeeth Reddy (India) Ashwini Ponnappa
January 23	Syed Modi International (Draw): Host: Lucknow, India; Level: Grand Prix Gold; Prize: $120,000; Format: 64MS/32WS/32MD/32WD/32XD	Score: 22–20, 21–10	
January 23	Iceland International: Host: Reykjavík, Iceland; Level: International Series; Prize: $8,000; Format: 32MS/32WS/32MD/32WD/32XD	(India) Subhankar Dey	(Finland) Kalle Koljonen
January 23	Iceland International: Host: Reykjavík, Iceland; Level: International Series; Prize: $8,000; Format: 32MS/32WS/32MD/32WD/32XD	Score: 21–11, 21–17	
January 23	Iceland International: Host: Reykjavík, Iceland; Level: International Series; Prize: $8,000; Format: 32MS/32WS/32MD/32WD/32XD	(Malaysia) Yang Li Lian	(Malaysia) Lyddia Cheah Yi Yu
January 23	Iceland International: Host: Reykjavík, Iceland; Level: International Series; Prize: $8,000; Format: 32MS/32WS/32MD/32WD/32XD	Score: 21–8, 21–11	
January 23	Iceland International: Host: Reykjavík, Iceland; Level: International Series; Prize: $8,000; Format: 32MS/32WS/32MD/32WD/32XD	(Poland) Pawel Pradzinski (Poland) Jan Rudzinski	(England) Zach Russ (England) Steven Stallwood
January 23	Iceland International: Host: Reykjavík, Iceland; Level: International Series; Prize: $8,000; Format: 32MS/32WS/32MD/32WD/32XD	Score: 24–22, 10–21, 21–16	
January 23	Iceland International: Host: Reykjavík, Iceland; Level: International Series; Prize: $8,000; Format: 32MS/32WS/32MD/32WD/32XD	(Malaysia) Yang Li Lian (Malaysia) Lyddia Cheah Yi Yu	(England) Grace King (England) Hope Warner
January 23	Iceland International: Host: Reykjavík, Iceland; Level: International Series; Prize: $8,000; Format: 32MS/32WS/32MD/32WD/32XD	Score: 21–6, 21–16	
January 23	Iceland International: Host: Reykjavík, Iceland; Level: International Series; Prize: $8,000; Format: 32MS/32WS/32MD/32WD/32XD	(England) Callum Hemming (England) Fee Teng Liew	(England) Steven Stallwood (England) Hope Warner
January 23	Iceland International: Host: Reykjavík, Iceland; Level: International Series; Prize: $8,000; Format: 32MS/32WS/32MD/32WD/32XD	Score: 19–21, 21–16, 21–11	

=== February ===
Week of	Tournament	Champions	Runners-up
February 6	Thailand Masters (Draw): Host: Bangkok, Thailand; Level: Grand Prix Gold; Prize: $120,000; Format: 64MS/32WS/32MD/32WD/32XD	(Indonesia) Tommy Sugiarto	(Thailand) Kantaphon Wangcharoen
February 6	Thailand Masters (Draw): Host: Bangkok, Thailand; Level: Grand Prix Gold; Prize: $120,000; Format: 64MS/32WS/32MD/32WD/32XD	Score: 21–17, 21–11	
February 6	Thailand Masters (Draw): Host: Bangkok, Thailand; Level: Grand Prix Gold; Prize: $120,000; Format: 64MS/32WS/32MD/32WD/32XD	(Thailand) Busanan Ongbamrungphan	(Japan) Aya Ohori
February 6	Thailand Masters (Draw): Host: Bangkok, Thailand; Level: Grand Prix Gold; Prize: $120,000; Format: 64MS/32WS/32MD/32WD/32XD	Score: 21–18, 21–16	
February 6	Thailand Masters (Draw): Host: Bangkok, Thailand; Level: Grand Prix Gold; Prize: $120,000; Format: 64MS/32WS/32MD/32WD/32XD	(China) Huang Kaixiang (China) Wang Yilyu	(Chinese Taipei) Lu Ching-yao (Chinese Taipei) Yang Po-han
February 6	Thailand Masters (Draw): Host: Bangkok, Thailand; Level: Grand Prix Gold; Prize: $120,000; Format: 64MS/32WS/32MD/32WD/32XD	Score: 21–19, 21–23, 21–16	
February 6	Thailand Masters (Draw): Host: Bangkok, Thailand; Level: Grand Prix Gold; Prize: $120,000; Format: 64MS/32WS/32MD/32WD/32XD	(China) Chen Qingchen (China) Jia Yifan	(Thailand) Puttita Supajirakul (Thailand) Sapsiree Taerattanachai
February 6	Thailand Masters (Draw): Host: Bangkok, Thailand; Level: Grand Prix Gold; Prize: $120,000; Format: 64MS/32WS/32MD/32WD/32XD	Score: 21–16, 21–15	
February 6	Thailand Masters (Draw): Host: Bangkok, Thailand; Level: Grand Prix Gold; Prize: $120,000; Format: 64MS/32WS/32MD/32WD/32XD	(China) Zhang Nan (China) Li Yinhui	(Thailand) Dechapol Puavaranukroh (Thailand) Sapsiree Taerattanachai
February 6	Thailand Masters (Draw): Host: Bangkok, Thailand; Level: Grand Prix Gold; Prize: $120,000; Format: 64MS/32WS/32MD/32WD/32XD	Score: 21–11, 20–22, 21–13	
February 6	Iran Fajr International: Host: Tehran, Iran; Level: International Challenge; Prize: $20,000; Format: 64MS/32WS/32MD/32WD	(Indonesia) Panji Ahmad Maulana	(Indonesia) Vega Vio Nirwanda
February 6	Iran Fajr International: Host: Tehran, Iran; Level: International Challenge; Prize: $20,000; Format: 64MS/32WS/32MD/32WD	Score: 11–4, 6–11, 11–6, 11–8	
February 6	Iran Fajr International: Host: Tehran, Iran; Level: International Challenge; Prize: $20,000; Format: 64MS/32WS/32MD/32WD	(Russia) Ksenia Polikarpova	(Singapore) Grace Chua
February 6	Iran Fajr International: Host: Tehran, Iran; Level: International Challenge; Prize: $20,000; Format: 64MS/32WS/32MD/32WD	Score: 9–11, 11–4, 11–5, 11–3	
February 6	Iran Fajr International: Host: Tehran, Iran; Level: International Challenge; Prize: $20,000; Format: 64MS/32WS/32MD/32WD	(India) Arjun M. R. (India) Ramchandran Shlok	(Indonesia) Kenas Adi Haryanto (Indonesia) Muhammad Reza Pahlevi Isfahani
February 6	Iran Fajr International: Host: Tehran, Iran; Level: International Challenge; Prize: $20,000; Format: 64MS/32WS/32MD/32WD	Score: 11–8, 11–8, 11–9	
February 6	Iran Fajr International: Host: Tehran, Iran; Level: International Challenge; Prize: $20,000; Format: 64MS/32WS/32MD/32WD	(Singapore) Ren-ne Ong (Singapore) Crystal Wong	(Singapore) Citra Putri Sari Dewi (Singapore) Jin Yujia
February 6	Iran Fajr International: Host: Tehran, Iran; Level: International Challenge; Prize: $20,000; Format: 64MS/32WS/32MD/32WD	Score: 11–8, 11–13, 7–11, 11–8, 11–5	
February 6	Nouméa International: Host: Nouméa, New Caledonia; Level: International Series; Prize: $8,000; Format: 32MS/32WS/32MD/16WD/32XD	(Australia) Ashwant Gobinathan	(New Zealand) Dylan Soedjasa
February 6	Nouméa International: Host: Nouméa, New Caledonia; Level: International Series; Prize: $8,000; Format: 32MS/32WS/32MD/16WD/32XD	Score: 24–22, 21–15	
February 6	Nouméa International: Host: Nouméa, New Caledonia; Level: International Series; Prize: $8,000; Format: 32MS/32WS/32MD/16WD/32XD	(Australia) Chen Hsuan-yu	(Australia) Joy Lai
February 6	Nouméa International: Host: Nouméa, New Caledonia; Level: International Series; Prize: $8,000; Format: 32MS/32WS/32MD/16WD/32XD	Score: 21–16, 21–9	
February 6	Nouméa International: Host: Nouméa, New Caledonia; Level: International Series; Prize: $8,000; Format: 32MS/32WS/32MD/16WD/32XD	(Australia) Matthew Chau (Australia) Sawan Serasinghe	(Australia) Joel Findlay (Australia) Jeff Tho
February 6	Nouméa International: Host: Nouméa, New Caledonia; Level: International Series; Prize: $8,000; Format: 32MS/32WS/32MD/16WD/32XD	Score: 17–21, 21–7, 21–14	
February 6	Nouméa International: Host: Nouméa, New Caledonia; Level: International Series; Prize: $8,000; Format: 32MS/32WS/32MD/16WD/32XD	(Australia) Setyana Mapasa (Australia) Gronya Somerville	(Australia) Tiffany Ho (Australia) Joy Lai
February 6	Nouméa International: Host: Nouméa, New Caledonia; Level: International Series; Prize: $8,000; Format: 32MS/32WS/32MD/16WD/32XD	Score: 21–11, 21–8	
February 6	Nouméa International: Host: Nouméa, New Caledonia; Level: International Series; Prize: $8,000; Format: 32MS/32WS/32MD/16WD/32XD	(Australia) Sawan Serasinghe (Australia) Setyana Mapasa	(New Zealand) Dylan Soedjasa (New Zealand) Susannah Leydon-Davis
February 6	Nouméa International: Host: Nouméa, New Caledonia; Level: International Series; Prize: $8,000; Format: 32MS/32WS/32MD/16WD/32XD	Score: 21–13, 15–21, 21–17	
February 13	Oceania Badminton Championships (Draw): Host: Nouméa, New Caledonia; Level: Continental Championships; Format: 32MS/16WS/16MD/8WD/16XD	(Australia) Pit Seng Low	(New Zealand) Niccolo Tagle
February 13	Oceania Badminton Championships (Draw): Host: Nouméa, New Caledonia; Level: Continental Championships; Format: 32MS/16WS/16MD/8WD/16XD	Score: 21–17, 13–21, 21–13	
February 13	Oceania Badminton Championships (Draw): Host: Nouméa, New Caledonia; Level: Continental Championships; Format: 32MS/16WS/16MD/8WD/16XD	(Australia) Chen Hsuan-yu	(Australia) Tiffany Ho
February 13	Oceania Badminton Championships (Draw): Host: Nouméa, New Caledonia; Level: Continental Championships; Format: 32MS/16WS/16MD/8WD/16XD	Score: 21–18, 21–11	
February 13	Oceania Badminton Championships (Draw): Host: Nouméa, New Caledonia; Level: Continental Championships; Format: 32MS/16WS/16MD/8WD/16XD	(Australia) Matthew Chau (Australia) Sawan Serasinghe	(New Zealand) Kevin Dennerly-Minturn (New Zealand) Niccolo Tagle
February 13	Oceania Badminton Championships (Draw): Host: Nouméa, New Caledonia; Level: Continental Championships; Format: 32MS/16WS/16MD/8WD/16XD	Score: 21–8, 21–14	
February 13	Oceania Badminton Championships (Draw): Host: Nouméa, New Caledonia; Level: Continental Championships; Format: 32MS/16WS/16MD/8WD/16XD	(Australia) Setyana Mapasa (Australia) Gronya Somerville	(Australia) Tiffany Ho (Australia) Joy Lai
February 13	Oceania Badminton Championships (Draw): Host: Nouméa, New Caledonia; Level: Continental Championships; Format: 32MS/16WS/16MD/8WD/16XD	Score: 16–21, 21–18, 21–14	
February 13	Oceania Badminton Championships (Draw): Host: Nouméa, New Caledonia; Level: Continental Championships; Format: 32MS/16WS/16MD/8WD/16XD	(Australia) Sawan Serasinghe (Australia) Setyana Mapasa	(Australia) Joel Findlay (Australia) Gronya Somerville
February 13	Oceania Badminton Championships (Draw): Host: Nouméa, New Caledonia; Level: Continental Championships; Format: 32MS/16WS/16MD/8WD/16XD	Score: 21–19, 21–9	
February 13	Badminton Asia Mixed Team Championships (Draw): Host: Ho Chi Minh City, Vietnam; Level: Continental Team Championships; Format: 13 teams (Round robin)	Japan	South Korea
February 13	Badminton Asia Mixed Team Championships (Draw): Host: Ho Chi Minh City, Vietnam; Level: Continental Team Championships; Format: 13 teams (Round robin)	Takeshi Kamura / Keigo Sonoda; Akane Yamaguchi; Kenta Nishimoto; Misaki Matsutomo / Ayaka Takahashi; Yuta Watanabe / Arisa Higashino	Kim Gi-jung / Yoo Yeon-seong; Sung Ji-hyun; Jeon Hyeok-jin; Chang Ye-na / Lee So-hee; Kim Gi-jung / Kim Ha-na
February 13	Badminton Asia Mixed Team Championships (Draw): Host: Ho Chi Minh City, Vietnam; Level: Continental Team Championships; Format: 13 teams (Round robin)	Score: 3–0	
February 13	European Mixed Team Badminton Championships (Draw): Host: Lubin, Poland; Level: Continental Team Championships; Format: 12 teams (Round robin)	Denmark	Russia
February 13	European Mixed Team Badminton Championships (Draw): Host: Lubin, Poland; Level: Continental Team Championships; Format: 12 teams (Round robin)	Joachim Fischer Nielsen / Christinna Pedersen; Anders Antonsen; Line Kjærsfeldt; Mathias Boe / Carsten Mogensen; Kamilla Rytter Juhl / Christinna Pedersen	Ivan Sozonov / Ekaterina Bolotova; Anatoliy Yartsev; Evgeniya Kosetskaya; Evgenij Dremin / Ivan Sozonov; Anastasia Chervyakova / Olga Morozova
February 13	European Mixed Team Badminton Championships (Draw): Host: Lubin, Poland; Level: Continental Team Championships; Format: 12 teams (Round robin)	Score: 3–0	
February 13	Pan Am Badminton Championships (Team Event)(Draw): Host: Santo Domingo, Dominican Republic; Level: Continental Team Championships; Format: 6 teams (Round robin)	Canada	Brazil
February 13	Pan Am Badminton Championships (Team Event)(Draw): Host: Santo Domingo, Dominican Republic; Level: Continental Team Championships; Format: 6 teams (Round robin)	Jason Ho-Shue; Brittney Tam; Jason Ho-Shue / Nyl Yakura; Michelle Tong / Josephine Wu; Nyl Yakura / Josephine Wu	Ygor Coelho; Fabiana Silva; Hugo Arthuso / Fabricio Farias; Sâmia Lima / Amanda Santos; Artur Silva Pomoceno / Fabiana Silva
February 13	Pan Am Badminton Championships (Team Event)(Draw): Host: Santo Domingo, Dominican Republic; Level: Continental Team Championships; Format: 6 teams (Round robin)	Score: 3–0	
February 20	Austrian Open: Host: Vienna, Austria; Level: International Challenge; Prize: $20,000; Format: 32MS/32WS/32MD/32WD/32XD	(Japan) Kanta Tsuneyama	(Spain) Pablo Abián
February 20	Austrian Open: Host: Vienna, Austria; Level: International Challenge; Prize: $20,000; Format: 32MS/32WS/32MD/32WD/32XD	Score: 21–10, 12–21, 21–11	
February 20	Austrian Open: Host: Vienna, Austria; Level: International Challenge; Prize: $20,000; Format: 32MS/32WS/32MD/32WD/32XD	(Scotland) Kirsty Gilmour	(Germany) Fabienne Deprez
February 20	Austrian Open: Host: Vienna, Austria; Level: International Challenge; Prize: $20,000; Format: 32MS/32WS/32MD/32WD/32XD	Score: 21–17, 21–9	
February 20	Austrian Open: Host: Vienna, Austria; Level: International Challenge; Prize: $20,000; Format: 32MS/32WS/32MD/32WD/32XD	(Japan) Takuto Inoue (Japan) Yuki Kaneko	(Denmark) Frederik Colberg (Denmark) Rasmus Fladberg
February 20	Austrian Open: Host: Vienna, Austria; Level: International Challenge; Prize: $20,000; Format: 32MS/32WS/32MD/32WD/32XD	Score: 21–19, 21–17	
February 20	Austrian Open: Host: Vienna, Austria; Level: International Challenge; Prize: $20,000; Format: 32MS/32WS/32MD/32WD/32XD	(Japan) Rira Kawashima (Japan) Saori Ozaki	(China) Wu Qianqian (China) Xia Chunyu
February 20	Austrian Open: Host: Vienna, Austria; Level: International Challenge; Prize: $20,000; Format: 32MS/32WS/32MD/32WD/32XD	Score: 18–21, 22–20, 21–11	
February 20	Austrian Open: Host: Vienna, Austria; Level: International Challenge; Prize: $20,000; Format: 32MS/32WS/32MD/32WD/32XD	(Denmark) Mikkel Mikkelsen (Denmark) Mai Surrow	(China) Gao Xiangcheng (China) Xia Chunyu
February 20	Austrian Open: Host: Vienna, Austria; Level: International Challenge; Prize: $20,000; Format: 32MS/32WS/32MD/32WD/32XD	Score: 21–19, 17–21, 21–14	
February 20	Uganda International: Host: Kampala, Uganda; Level: International Series; Prize: $8,000; Format: 32MS/32WS/32MD/16WD/32XD	(Mauritius) Georges Paul	(Uganda) Edwin Ekiring
February 20	Uganda International: Host: Kampala, Uganda; Level: International Series; Prize: $8,000; Format: 32MS/32WS/32MD/16WD/32XD	Score: 21–19, 7–11 (retired)	
February 20	Uganda International: Host: Kampala, Uganda; Level: International Series; Prize: $8,000; Format: 32MS/32WS/32MD/16WD/32XD	(Uganda) Bridget Shamim Bangi	(Jordan) Domou Amro
February 20	Uganda International: Host: Kampala, Uganda; Level: International Series; Prize: $8,000; Format: 32MS/32WS/32MD/16WD/32XD	Score: 21–9, 21–16	
February 20	Uganda International: Host: Kampala, Uganda; Level: International Series; Prize: $8,000; Format: 32MS/32WS/32MD/16WD/32XD	(India) Alwin Francis (India) Tarun Kona	(Mauritius) Aatish Lubah (Mauritius) Georges Paul
February 20	Uganda International: Host: Kampala, Uganda; Level: International Series; Prize: $8,000; Format: 32MS/32WS/32MD/16WD/32XD	Score: 21–8, 21–14	
February 20	Uganda International: Host: Kampala, Uganda; Level: International Series; Prize: $8,000; Format: 32MS/32WS/32MD/16WD/32XD	(Egypt) Doha Hany (Egypt) Hadia Hosny	(Zambia) Evelyn Siamupangila (Zambia) Ogar Siamupangila
February 20	Uganda International: Host: Kampala, Uganda; Level: International Series; Prize: $8,000; Format: 32MS/32WS/32MD/16WD/32XD	Score: 21–10, 21–10	
February 20	Uganda International: Host: Kampala, Uganda; Level: International Series; Prize: $8,000; Format: 32MS/32WS/32MD/16WD/32XD	(Jordan) Bahaedeen Ahmad Alshannik (Jordan) Domou Amro	(Egypt) Ahmed Salah (Egypt) Menna El-Tanany
February 20	Uganda International: Host: Kampala, Uganda; Level: International Series; Prize: $8,000; Format: 32MS/32WS/32MD/16WD/32XD	Score: 16–21, 21–12, 21–19	
February 27	German Open (Draw): Host: Mülheim, Germany; Level: Grand Prix Gold; Prize: $120,000; Format: 64MS/32WS/32MD/32WD/32XD	(Chinese Taipei) Chou Tien-chen	(Chinese Taipei) Wang Tzu-wei
February 27	German Open (Draw): Host: Mülheim, Germany; Level: Grand Prix Gold; Prize: $120,000; Format: 64MS/32WS/32MD/32WD/32XD	Score: 21–16, 21–14	
February 27	German Open (Draw): Host: Mülheim, Germany; Level: Grand Prix Gold; Prize: $120,000; Format: 64MS/32WS/32MD/32WD/32XD	(Japan) Akane Yamaguchi	(Spain) Carolina Marín
February 27	German Open (Draw): Host: Mülheim, Germany; Level: Grand Prix Gold; Prize: $120,000; Format: 64MS/32WS/32MD/32WD/32XD	Score: Walkover	
February 27	German Open (Draw): Host: Mülheim, Germany; Level: Grand Prix Gold; Prize: $120,000; Format: 64MS/32WS/32MD/32WD/32XD	(Denmark) Kim Astrup (Denmark) Anders Skaarup Rasmussen	(Denmark) Mads Conrad-Petersen (Denmark) Mads Pieler Kolding
February 27	German Open (Draw): Host: Mülheim, Germany; Level: Grand Prix Gold; Prize: $120,000; Format: 64MS/32WS/32MD/32WD/32XD	Score: 21–17, 21–13	
February 27	German Open (Draw): Host: Mülheim, Germany; Level: Grand Prix Gold; Prize: $120,000; Format: 64MS/32WS/32MD/32WD/32XD	(Japan) Yuki Fukushima (Japan) Sayaka Hirota	(China) Huang Dongping (China) Li Yinhui
February 27	German Open (Draw): Host: Mülheim, Germany; Level: Grand Prix Gold; Prize: $120,000; Format: 64MS/32WS/32MD/32WD/32XD	Score: 15–21, 21–17, 21–15	
February 27	German Open (Draw): Host: Mülheim, Germany; Level: Grand Prix Gold; Prize: $120,000; Format: 64MS/32WS/32MD/32WD/32XD	(China) Zhang Nan (China) Li Yinhui	(China) Lu Kai (China) Huang Yaqiong
February 27	German Open (Draw): Host: Mülheim, Germany; Level: Grand Prix Gold; Prize: $120,000; Format: 64MS/32WS/32MD/32WD/32XD	Score: 22–20, 21–11	
February 27	Jamaica International: Host: Kingston, Jamaica; Level: International Series; Prize: $10,000; Format: 32MS/16WS/16MD/8WD/16XD	(Denmark) Søren Toft	(Czech Republic) Adam Mendrek
February 27	Jamaica International: Host: Kingston, Jamaica; Level: International Series; Prize: $10,000; Format: 32MS/16WS/16MD/8WD/16XD	Score: 21–14, 14–21, 22–20	
February 27	Jamaica International: Host: Kingston, Jamaica; Level: International Series; Prize: $10,000; Format: 32MS/16WS/16MD/8WD/16XD	(Canada) Rachel Honderich	(Slovakia) Martina Repiská
February 27	Jamaica International: Host: Kingston, Jamaica; Level: International Series; Prize: $10,000; Format: 32MS/16WS/16MD/8WD/16XD	Score: 15–21, 21–19, 21–15	
February 27	Jamaica International: Host: Kingston, Jamaica; Level: International Series; Prize: $10,000; Format: 32MS/16WS/16MD/8WD/16XD	(India) Venkatesh Prasad (India) Jagadish Yadav	(Slovakia) Milan Dratva (Slovakia) Matej Hliničan
February 27	Jamaica International: Host: Kingston, Jamaica; Level: International Series; Prize: $10,000; Format: 32MS/16WS/16MD/8WD/16XD	Score: 21–14, 21–11	
February 27	Jamaica International: Host: Kingston, Jamaica; Level: International Series; Prize: $10,000; Format: 32MS/16WS/16MD/8WD/16XD	(Australia) Leanne Choo (Canada) Rachel Honderich	(Jamaica) Mikaylia Haldane (Jamaica) Katherine Wynter
February 27	Jamaica International: Host: Kingston, Jamaica; Level: International Series; Prize: $10,000; Format: 32MS/16WS/16MD/8WD/16XD	Score: 21–2, 21–8	
February 27	Jamaica International: Host: Kingston, Jamaica; Level: International Series; Prize: $10,000; Format: 32MS/16WS/16MD/8WD/16XD	(Canada) Toby Ng (Canada) Rachel Honderich	(Jamaica) Dennis Coke (Jamaica) Katherine Wynter
February 27	Jamaica International: Host: Kingston, Jamaica; Level: International Series; Prize: $10,000; Format: 32MS/16WS/16MD/8WD/16XD	Score: 21–9, 21–8	

=== March ===
Week of	Tournament	Champions	Runners-up
March 6	All England Open (Draw): Host: Birmingham, England; Level: Superseries Premier; Prize: $600,000; Format: 32MS/32WS/32MD/32WD/32XD	(Malaysia) Lee Chong Wei	(China) Shi Yuqi
March 6	All England Open (Draw): Host: Birmingham, England; Level: Superseries Premier; Prize: $600,000; Format: 32MS/32WS/32MD/32WD/32XD	Score: 21–12, 21–10	
March 6	All England Open (Draw): Host: Birmingham, England; Level: Superseries Premier; Prize: $600,000; Format: 32MS/32WS/32MD/32WD/32XD	(Chinese Taipei) Tai Tzu-ying	(Thailand) Ratchanok Intanon
March 6	All England Open (Draw): Host: Birmingham, England; Level: Superseries Premier; Prize: $600,000; Format: 32MS/32WS/32MD/32WD/32XD	Score: 21–16, 22–20	
March 6	All England Open (Draw): Host: Birmingham, England; Level: Superseries Premier; Prize: $600,000; Format: 32MS/32WS/32MD/32WD/32XD	(Indonesia) Marcus Fernaldi Gideon (Indonesia) Kevin Sanjaya Sukamuljo	(China) Li Junhui (China) Liu Yuchen
March 6	All England Open (Draw): Host: Birmingham, England; Level: Superseries Premier; Prize: $600,000; Format: 32MS/32WS/32MD/32WD/32XD	Score: 21–19, 21–14	
March 6	All England Open (Draw): Host: Birmingham, England; Level: Superseries Premier; Prize: $600,000; Format: 32MS/32WS/32MD/32WD/32XD	(South Korea) Chang Ye-na (South Korea) Lee So-hee	(Denmark) Christinna Pedersen (Denmark) Kamilla Rytter Juhl
March 6	All England Open (Draw): Host: Birmingham, England; Level: Superseries Premier; Prize: $600,000; Format: 32MS/32WS/32MD/32WD/32XD	Score: 21–18, 21–13	
March 6	All England Open (Draw): Host: Birmingham, England; Level: Superseries Premier; Prize: $600,000; Format: 32MS/32WS/32MD/32WD/32XD	(China) Lu Kai (China) Huang Yaqiong	(Malaysia) Chan Peng Soon (Malaysia) Goh Liu Ying
March 6	All England Open (Draw): Host: Birmingham, England; Level: Superseries Premier; Prize: $600,000; Format: 32MS/32WS/32MD/32WD/32XD	Score: 18–21, 21–19, 21–16	
March 6	Brazil International: Host: São Paulo, Brazil; Level: International Challenge; Prize: $20,000; Format: 32MS/32WS/32MD/8WD/32XD	(Sri Lanka) Niluka Karunaratne	(Brazil) Ygor Coelho
March 6	Brazil International: Host: São Paulo, Brazil; Level: International Challenge; Prize: $20,000; Format: 32MS/32WS/32MD/8WD/32XD	Score: 9–21, 21–14, 21–18	
March 6	Brazil International: Host: São Paulo, Brazil; Level: International Challenge; Prize: $20,000; Format: 32MS/32WS/32MD/8WD/32XD	(Japan) Haruko Suzuki	(Brazil) Fabiana Silva
March 6	Brazil International: Host: São Paulo, Brazil; Level: International Challenge; Prize: $20,000; Format: 32MS/32WS/32MD/8WD/32XD	Score: 21–9, 21–6	
March 6	Brazil International: Host: São Paulo, Brazil; Level: International Challenge; Prize: $20,000; Format: 32MS/32WS/32MD/8WD/32XD	(Russia) Evgenij Dremin (Russia) Denis Grachev	(Czech Republic) Adam Mendrek (Germany) Jonathan Persson
March 6	Brazil International: Host: São Paulo, Brazil; Level: International Challenge; Prize: $20,000; Format: 32MS/32WS/32MD/8WD/32XD	Score: 21–17, 21–16	
March 6	Brazil International: Host: São Paulo, Brazil; Level: International Challenge; Prize: $20,000; Format: 32MS/32WS/32MD/8WD/32XD	(Brazil) Jaqueline Lima (Brazil) Samia Lima	(Brazil) Thalita Correa (Brazil) Paloma Eduarda da Silva
March 6	Brazil International: Host: São Paulo, Brazil; Level: International Challenge; Prize: $20,000; Format: 32MS/32WS/32MD/8WD/32XD	Score: 14–21, 21–19, 21–15	
March 6	Brazil International: Host: São Paulo, Brazil; Level: International Challenge; Prize: $20,000; Format: 32MS/32WS/32MD/8WD/32XD	(Brazil) Hugo Arthuso (Brazil) Fabiana Silva	(Germany) Jonathan Persson (Mauritius) Kate Foo Kune
March 6	Brazil International: Host: São Paulo, Brazil; Level: International Challenge; Prize: $20,000; Format: 32MS/32WS/32MD/8WD/32XD	Score: 21–11, 21–19	
March 6	Portugal International: Host: Caldas da Rainha, Portugal; Level: International Series; Prize: $8,000; Format: 32MS/32WS/32MD/32WD/32XD	(India) Subhankar Dey	(Denmark) Victor Svendsen
March 6	Portugal International: Host: Caldas da Rainha, Portugal; Level: International Series; Prize: $8,000; Format: 32MS/32WS/32MD/32WD/32XD	Score: 21–19, 21–19	
March 6	Portugal International: Host: Caldas da Rainha, Portugal; Level: International Series; Prize: $8,000; Format: 32MS/32WS/32MD/32WD/32XD	(Japan) Sayaka Takahashi	(Japan) Chisato Hoshi
March 6	Portugal International: Host: Caldas da Rainha, Portugal; Level: International Series; Prize: $8,000; Format: 32MS/32WS/32MD/32WD/32XD	Score: 21–10, 21–15	
March 6	Portugal International: Host: Caldas da Rainha, Portugal; Level: International Series; Prize: $8,000; Format: 32MS/32WS/32MD/32WD/32XD	(Japan) Kazuaki Oshima (Japan) Yuta Yamasaki	(Denmark) Steve Olesen (Denmark) Mathias Weber Estrup
March 6	Portugal International: Host: Caldas da Rainha, Portugal; Level: International Series; Prize: $8,000; Format: 32MS/32WS/32MD/32WD/32XD	Score: 21–16, 21–8	
March 6	Portugal International: Host: Caldas da Rainha, Portugal; Level: International Series; Prize: $8,000; Format: 32MS/32WS/32MD/32WD/32XD	(Japan) Chisato Hoshi (Japan) Naru Shinoya	(Denmark) Emilie Juul Moller (Denmark) Mai Surrow
March 6	Portugal International: Host: Caldas da Rainha, Portugal; Level: International Series; Prize: $8,000; Format: 32MS/32WS/32MD/32WD/32XD	Score: 21–13, 21–6	
March 6	Portugal International: Host: Caldas da Rainha, Portugal; Level: International Series; Prize: $8,000; Format: 32MS/32WS/32MD/32WD/32XD	(Finland) Anton Kaisti (Finland) Jenny Nyström	(France) Thom Gicquel (France) Delphine Delrue
March 6	Portugal International: Host: Caldas da Rainha, Portugal; Level: International Series; Prize: $8,000; Format: 32MS/32WS/32MD/32WD/32XD	Score: 19–21, 21–19, 21–12	
March 13	Swiss Open (Draw): Host: Basel, Switzerland; Level: Grand Prix Gold; Prize: $120,000; Format: 64MS/32WS/32MD/32WD/32XD	(China) Lin Dan	(China) Shi Yuqi
March 13	Swiss Open (Draw): Host: Basel, Switzerland; Level: Grand Prix Gold; Prize: $120,000; Format: 64MS/32WS/32MD/32WD/32XD	Score: 21–12, 21–11	
March 13	Swiss Open (Draw): Host: Basel, Switzerland; Level: Grand Prix Gold; Prize: $120,000; Format: 64MS/32WS/32MD/32WD/32XD	(China) Chen Xiaoxin	(China) Chen Yufei
March 13	Swiss Open (Draw): Host: Basel, Switzerland; Level: Grand Prix Gold; Prize: $120,000; Format: 64MS/32WS/32MD/32WD/32XD	Score: 21–19, 21–14	
March 13	Swiss Open (Draw): Host: Basel, Switzerland; Level: Grand Prix Gold; Prize: $120,000; Format: 64MS/32WS/32MD/32WD/32XD	(China) Chai Biao (China) Hong Wei	(China) Liu Cheng (China) Zhang Nan
March 13	Swiss Open (Draw): Host: Basel, Switzerland; Level: Grand Prix Gold; Prize: $120,000; Format: 64MS/32WS/32MD/32WD/32XD	Score: 13–21, 21–16, 21–15	
March 13	Swiss Open (Draw): Host: Basel, Switzerland; Level: Grand Prix Gold; Prize: $120,000; Format: 64MS/32WS/32MD/32WD/32XD	(China) Chen Qingchen (China) Jia Yifan	(Bulgaria) Gabriela Stoeva (Bulgaria) Stefani Stoeva
March 13	Swiss Open (Draw): Host: Basel, Switzerland; Level: Grand Prix Gold; Prize: $120,000; Format: 64MS/32WS/32MD/32WD/32XD	Score: 21–16, 21–15	
March 13	Swiss Open (Draw): Host: Basel, Switzerland; Level: Grand Prix Gold; Prize: $120,000; Format: 64MS/32WS/32MD/32WD/32XD	(Thailand) Dechapol Puavaranukroh (Thailand) Sapsiree Taerattanachai	(Indonesia) Praveen Jordan (Indonesia) Debby Susanto
March 13	Swiss Open (Draw): Host: Basel, Switzerland; Level: Grand Prix Gold; Prize: $120,000; Format: 64MS/32WS/32MD/32WD/32XD	Score: 21–18, 21–15	
March 13	Peru International Series: Host: Lima, Peru; Level: International Series; Prize: $8,000; Format: 32MS/32WS/16MD/16WD/32XD	(Mexico) Luis Ramón Garrido	(Indonesia) Ikhsan Rumbay
March 13	Peru International Series: Host: Lima, Peru; Level: International Series; Prize: $8,000; Format: 32MS/32WS/16MD/16WD/32XD	Score: 21–18, 21–14	
March 13	Peru International Series: Host: Lima, Peru; Level: International Series; Prize: $8,000; Format: 32MS/32WS/16MD/16WD/32XD	(Peru) Daniela Macías	(Peru) Daniela Zapata
March 13	Peru International Series: Host: Lima, Peru; Level: International Series; Prize: $8,000; Format: 32MS/32WS/16MD/16WD/32XD	Score: 21–12, 21–7	
March 13	Peru International Series: Host: Lima, Peru; Level: International Series; Prize: $8,000; Format: 32MS/32WS/16MD/16WD/32XD	(Austria) Daniel Grassmuck (Austria) Luka Wraber	(Austria) Dominik Stipsits (Austria) Roman Zirnwald
March 13	Peru International Series: Host: Lima, Peru; Level: International Series; Prize: $8,000; Format: 32MS/32WS/16MD/16WD/32XD	Score: 14–21, 21–15, 21–15	
March 13	Peru International Series: Host: Lima, Peru; Level: International Series; Prize: $8,000; Format: 32MS/32WS/16MD/16WD/32XD	(Peru) Daniela Macías (Peru) Dánica Nishimura	(Peru) Inés Castillo (Peru) Paula la Torre Regal
March 13	Peru International Series: Host: Lima, Peru; Level: International Series; Prize: $8,000; Format: 32MS/32WS/16MD/16WD/32XD	Score: 21–12, 21–10	
March 13	Peru International Series: Host: Lima, Peru; Level: International Series; Prize: $8,000; Format: 32MS/32WS/16MD/16WD/32XD	(Peru) Mario Cuba (Peru) Katherine Winder	(Peru) Daniel la Torre Regal (Peru) Dánica Nishimura
March 13	Peru International Series: Host: Lima, Peru; Level: International Series; Prize: $8,000; Format: 32MS/32WS/16MD/16WD/32XD	Score: 21–18, 21–18	
March 20	Vietnam International Challenge: Host: Hanoi, Vietnam; Level: International Challenge; Prize: $20,000; Format: 64MS/32WS/32MD/32WD/32XD	(Vietnam) Nguyễn Tiến Minh	(Thailand) Khosit Phetpradab
March 20	Vietnam International Challenge: Host: Hanoi, Vietnam; Level: International Challenge; Prize: $20,000; Format: 64MS/32WS/32MD/32WD/32XD	Score: 21–14, 21–17	
March 20	Vietnam International Challenge: Host: Hanoi, Vietnam; Level: International Challenge; Prize: $20,000; Format: 64MS/32WS/32MD/32WD/32XD	(Thailand) Pornpawee Chochuwong	(Vietnam) Vũ Thị Trang
March 20	Vietnam International Challenge: Host: Hanoi, Vietnam; Level: International Challenge; Prize: $20,000; Format: 64MS/32WS/32MD/32WD/32XD	Score: 21–16, 21–17	
March 20	Vietnam International Challenge: Host: Hanoi, Vietnam; Level: International Challenge; Prize: $20,000; Format: 64MS/32WS/32MD/32WD/32XD	(India) Satwiksairaj Rankireddy (India) Chirag Shetty	(Thailand) Trawut Potieng (Thailand) Nanthakarn Yordphaisong
March 20	Vietnam International Challenge: Host: Hanoi, Vietnam; Level: International Challenge; Prize: $20,000; Format: 64MS/32WS/32MD/32WD/32XD	Score: 17–21, 21–9, 21–15	
March 20	Vietnam International Challenge: Host: Hanoi, Vietnam; Level: International Challenge; Prize: $20,000; Format: 64MS/32WS/32MD/32WD/32XD	(Japan) Erina Honda (Japan) Nozomi Shimizu	(Malaysia) Joyce Choong (Malaysia) Tee Jing Yi
March 20	Vietnam International Challenge: Host: Hanoi, Vietnam; Level: International Challenge; Prize: $20,000; Format: 64MS/32WS/32MD/32WD/32XD	Score: 21–14, 19–21, 21–14	
March 20	Vietnam International Challenge: Host: Hanoi, Vietnam; Level: International Challenge; Prize: $20,000; Format: 64MS/32WS/32MD/32WD/32XD	(China) Shi Longfei (China) Tang Pingyang	(Indonesia) Irfan Fadhilah (Indonesia) Weni Anggraini
March 20	Vietnam International Challenge: Host: Hanoi, Vietnam; Level: International Challenge; Prize: $20,000; Format: 64MS/32WS/32MD/32WD/32XD	Score: 21–16, 19–21, 21–15	
March 20	Polish Open: Host: Warsaw, Poland; Level: International Challenge; Prize: $20,000; Format: 32MS/32WS/32MD/32WD/32XD	(Malaysia) Tan Jia Wei	(Brazil) Ygor Coelho
March 20	Polish Open: Host: Warsaw, Poland; Level: International Challenge; Prize: $20,000; Format: 32MS/32WS/32MD/32WD/32XD	Score: 21–13, 20–22, 21–10	
March 20	Polish Open: Host: Warsaw, Poland; Level: International Challenge; Prize: $20,000; Format: 32MS/32WS/32MD/32WD/32XD	(Japan) Yui Hashimoto	(Malaysia) Lee Ying Ying
March 20	Polish Open: Host: Warsaw, Poland; Level: International Challenge; Prize: $20,000; Format: 32MS/32WS/32MD/32WD/32XD	Score: 13–21, 21–19, 21–10	
March 20	Polish Open: Host: Warsaw, Poland; Level: International Challenge; Prize: $20,000; Format: 32MS/32WS/32MD/32WD/32XD	(Poland) Łukasz Moreń (Poland) Wojciech Szkudlarczyk	(Scotland) Alexander Dunn (Scotland) Adam Hall
March 20	Polish Open: Host: Warsaw, Poland; Level: International Challenge; Prize: $20,000; Format: 32MS/32WS/32MD/32WD/32XD	Score: 21–11, 21–18	
March 20	Polish Open: Host: Warsaw, Poland; Level: International Challenge; Prize: $20,000; Format: 32MS/32WS/32MD/32WD/32XD	(Indonesia) Yulfira Barkah (Indonesia) Meirisa Cindy Sahputri	(Chinese Taipei) Chang Hsin-tien (Chinese Taipei) Yu Chien-hui
March 20	Polish Open: Host: Warsaw, Poland; Level: International Challenge; Prize: $20,000; Format: 32MS/32WS/32MD/32WD/32XD	Score: 21–12, 14–21, 21–14	
March 20	Polish Open: Host: Warsaw, Poland; Level: International Challenge; Prize: $20,000; Format: 32MS/32WS/32MD/32WD/32XD	(Poland) Robert Mateusiak (Poland) Nadieżda Zięba	(Chinese Taipei) Tseng Min-hao (Chinese Taipei) Hu Ling-fang
March 20	Polish Open: Host: Warsaw, Poland; Level: International Challenge; Prize: $20,000; Format: 32MS/32WS/32MD/32WD/32XD	Score: 20–22, 22–20, 21–13	
March 20	Giraldilla International: Host: La Habana, Cuba; Level: International Series; Prize: $8,000; Format: 32MS/32WS/16MD/16WD/32XD	(Cuba) Osleni Guerrero	(Italy) Rosario Maddaloni
March 20	Giraldilla International: Host: La Habana, Cuba; Level: International Series; Prize: $8,000; Format: 32MS/32WS/16MD/16WD/32XD	Score: 21–15, 21–15	
March 20	Giraldilla International: Host: La Habana, Cuba; Level: International Series; Prize: $8,000; Format: 32MS/32WS/16MD/16WD/32XD	(Hungary) Laura Sárosi	(Mexico) Mariana Ugalde
March 20	Giraldilla International: Host: La Habana, Cuba; Level: International Series; Prize: $8,000; Format: 32MS/32WS/16MD/16WD/32XD	Score: 21–19, 21–15	
March 20	Giraldilla International: Host: La Habana, Cuba; Level: International Series; Prize: $8,000; Format: 32MS/32WS/16MD/16WD/32XD	(Cuba) Osleni Guerrero (Cuba) Leodannis Martínez	(Italy) Lukas Osele (Italy) Kevin Strobl
March 20	Giraldilla International: Host: La Habana, Cuba; Level: International Series; Prize: $8,000; Format: 32MS/32WS/16MD/16WD/32XD	Score: 21–11, 22–24, 21–8	
March 20	Giraldilla International: Host: La Habana, Cuba; Level: International Series; Prize: $8,000; Format: 32MS/32WS/16MD/16WD/32XD	(Hungary) Laura Sárosi (Mexico) Mariana Ugalde	(Italy) Silvia Garino (Italy) Lisa Iversen
March 20	Giraldilla International: Host: La Habana, Cuba; Level: International Series; Prize: $8,000; Format: 32MS/32WS/16MD/16WD/32XD	Score: 21–15, 21–17	
March 20	Giraldilla International: Host: La Habana, Cuba; Level: International Series; Prize: $8,000; Format: 32MS/32WS/16MD/16WD/32XD	(Cuba) Leodannis Martínez (Cuba) Tahimara Oropeza	(Guatemala) Jonathan Solís (Guatemala) Mariana Paiz
March 20	Giraldilla International: Host: La Habana, Cuba; Level: International Series; Prize: $8,000; Format: 32MS/32WS/16MD/16WD/32XD	Score: 21–2, 21–13	
March 27	India Open (Draw): Host: New Delhi, India; Level: Superseries; Prize: $325,000; Format: 32MS/32WS/32MD/32WD/32XD	(Denmark) Viktor Axelsen	(Chinese Taipei) Chou Tien-chen
March 27	India Open (Draw): Host: New Delhi, India; Level: Superseries; Prize: $325,000; Format: 32MS/32WS/32MD/32WD/32XD	Score: 21–13, 21–10	
March 27	India Open (Draw): Host: New Delhi, India; Level: Superseries; Prize: $325,000; Format: 32MS/32WS/32MD/32WD/32XD	(India) P. V. Sindhu	(Spain) Carolina Marín
March 27	India Open (Draw): Host: New Delhi, India; Level: Superseries; Prize: $325,000; Format: 32MS/32WS/32MD/32WD/32XD	Score: 21–19, 21–16	
March 27	India Open (Draw): Host: New Delhi, India; Level: Superseries; Prize: $325,000; Format: 32MS/32WS/32MD/32WD/32XD	(Indonesia) Marcus Fernaldi Gideon (Indonesia) Kevin Sanjaya Sukamuljo	(Indonesia) Angga Pratama (Indonesia) Ricky Karanda Suwardi
March 27	India Open (Draw): Host: New Delhi, India; Level: Superseries; Prize: $325,000; Format: 32MS/32WS/32MD/32WD/32XD	Score: 21–11, 21–15	
March 27	India Open (Draw): Host: New Delhi, India; Level: Superseries; Prize: $325,000; Format: 32MS/32WS/32MD/32WD/32XD	(Japan) Shiho Tanaka (Japan) Koharu Yonemoto	(Japan) Naoko Fukuman (Japan) Kurumi Yonao
March 27	India Open (Draw): Host: New Delhi, India; Level: Superseries; Prize: $325,000; Format: 32MS/32WS/32MD/32WD/32XD	Score: 16–21, 21–19, 21–10	
March 27	India Open (Draw): Host: New Delhi, India; Level: Superseries; Prize: $325,000; Format: 32MS/32WS/32MD/32WD/32XD	(China) Lu Kai (China) Huang Yaqiong	(China) Zheng Siwei (China) Chen Qingchen
March 27	India Open (Draw): Host: New Delhi, India; Level: Superseries; Prize: $325,000; Format: 32MS/32WS/32MD/32WD/32XD	Score: 22–24, 21–14, 21–17	
March 27	Osaka International: Host: Osaka, Japan; Level: International Challenge; Prize: $20,000; Format: 32MS/32WS/32MD/32WD/32XD	(Japan) Yu Igarashi	(Chinese Taipei) Hsueh Hsuan-yi
March 27	Osaka International: Host: Osaka, Japan; Level: International Challenge; Prize: $20,000; Format: 32MS/32WS/32MD/32WD/32XD	Score: 25–23, 21–14	
March 27	Osaka International: Host: Osaka, Japan; Level: International Challenge; Prize: $20,000; Format: 32MS/32WS/32MD/32WD/32XD	(Japan) Sayaka Takahashi	(South Korea) Lee Jang-mi
March 27	Osaka International: Host: Osaka, Japan; Level: International Challenge; Prize: $20,000; Format: 32MS/32WS/32MD/32WD/32XD	Score: 21–16, 21–18	
March 27	Osaka International: Host: Osaka, Japan; Level: International Challenge; Prize: $20,000; Format: 32MS/32WS/32MD/32WD/32XD	(China) Wang Sijie (China) Zhuge Lukai	(Japan) Kazuya Itani (Japan) Tomoya Takashina
March 27	Osaka International: Host: Osaka, Japan; Level: International Challenge; Prize: $20,000; Format: 32MS/32WS/32MD/32WD/32XD	Score: 21–10, 21–19	
March 27	Osaka International: Host: Osaka, Japan; Level: International Challenge; Prize: $20,000; Format: 32MS/32WS/32MD/32WD/32XD	(South Korea) Kim So-yeong (South Korea) Yoo Hae-won	(Japan) Ayako Sakuramoto (Japan) Yukiko Takahata
March 27	Osaka International: Host: Osaka, Japan; Level: International Challenge; Prize: $20,000; Format: 32MS/32WS/32MD/32WD/32XD	Score: 16–21, 21–17, 21–19	
March 27	Osaka International: Host: Osaka, Japan; Level: International Challenge; Prize: $20,000; Format: 32MS/32WS/32MD/32WD/32XD	(China) Wang Sijie (China) Ni Bowen	(South Korea) Park Kyung-hoon (South Korea) Kong Hee-yong
March 27	Osaka International: Host: Osaka, Japan; Level: International Challenge; Prize: $20,000; Format: 32MS/32WS/32MD/32WD/32XD	Score: 18–21, 21–16, 21–12	
March 27	Orleans International: Host: Orléans, France; Level: International Challenge; Prize: $20,000; Format: 32MS/32WS/32MD/32WD/32XD	(Netherlands) Mark Caljouw	(France) Lucas Corvée
March 27	Orleans International: Host: Orléans, France; Level: International Challenge; Prize: $20,000; Format: 32MS/32WS/32MD/32WD/32XD	Score: 21–6, 18–21, 21–11	
March 27	Orleans International: Host: Orléans, France; Level: International Challenge; Prize: $20,000; Format: 32MS/32WS/32MD/32WD/32XD	(Scotland) Kirsty Gilmour	(Malaysia) Lee Ying Ying
March 27	Orleans International: Host: Orléans, France; Level: International Challenge; Prize: $20,000; Format: 32MS/32WS/32MD/32WD/32XD	Score: 22–20, 21–11	
March 27	Orleans International: Host: Orléans, France; Level: International Challenge; Prize: $20,000; Format: 32MS/32WS/32MD/32WD/32XD	(Chinese Taipei) Liao Min-chun (Chinese Taipei) Su Cheng-heng	(Indonesia) Kenas Adi Haryanto (Indonesia) Moh Reza Pahlevi Isfahani
March 27	Orleans International: Host: Orléans, France; Level: International Challenge; Prize: $20,000; Format: 32MS/32WS/32MD/32WD/32XD	Score: 21–12, 14–21, 21–17	
March 27	Orleans International: Host: Orléans, France; Level: International Challenge; Prize: $20,000; Format: 32MS/32WS/32MD/32WD/32XD	(Japan) Asumi Kugo (Japan) Megumi Yokoyama	(France) Delphine Delrue (France) Léa Palermo
March 27	Orleans International: Host: Orléans, France; Level: International Challenge; Prize: $20,000; Format: 32MS/32WS/32MD/32WD/32XD	Score: 21–14, 17–21, 21–12	
March 27	Orleans International: Host: Orléans, France; Level: International Challenge; Prize: $20,000; Format: 32MS/32WS/32MD/32WD/32XD	(Germany) Mark Lamsfuß (Germany) Isabel Herttrich	(Chinese Taipei) Chang Ko-chi (Chinese Taipei) Chang Hsin-tien
March 27	Orleans International: Host: Orléans, France; Level: International Challenge; Prize: $20,000; Format: 32MS/32WS/32MD/32WD/32XD	Score: 21–9, 21–15	

=== April ===
Week of	Tournament	Champions	Runners-up
April 1	Malaysia Open (Draw): Host: Kuching, Malaysia; Level: Superseries Premier; Prize: $600,000; Format: 32MS/32WS/32MD/32WD/32XD	(China) Lin Dan	(Malaysia) Lee Chong Wei
April 1	Malaysia Open (Draw): Host: Kuching, Malaysia; Level: Superseries Premier; Prize: $600,000; Format: 32MS/32WS/32MD/32WD/32XD	Score: 21–19, 21–14	
April 1	Malaysia Open (Draw): Host: Kuching, Malaysia; Level: Superseries Premier; Prize: $600,000; Format: 32MS/32WS/32MD/32WD/32XD	(Chinese Taipei) Tai Tzu-ying	(Spain) Carolina Marín
April 1	Malaysia Open (Draw): Host: Kuching, Malaysia; Level: Superseries Premier; Prize: $600,000; Format: 32MS/32WS/32MD/32WD/32XD	Score: 23–25, 22–20, 21–13	
April 1	Malaysia Open (Draw): Host: Kuching, Malaysia; Level: Superseries Premier; Prize: $600,000; Format: 32MS/32WS/32MD/32WD/32XD	(Indonesia) Marcus Fernaldi Gideon (Indonesia) Kevin Sanjaya Sukamuljo	(China) Fu Haifeng (China) Zheng Siwei
April 1	Malaysia Open (Draw): Host: Kuching, Malaysia; Level: Superseries Premier; Prize: $600,000; Format: 32MS/32WS/32MD/32WD/32XD	Score: 21–14, 14–21, 21–12	
April 1	Malaysia Open (Draw): Host: Kuching, Malaysia; Level: Superseries Premier; Prize: $600,000; Format: 32MS/32WS/32MD/32WD/32XD	(Japan) Yuki Fukushima (Japan) Sayaka Hirota	(China) Huang Yaqiong (China) Tang Jinhua
April 1	Malaysia Open (Draw): Host: Kuching, Malaysia; Level: Superseries Premier; Prize: $600,000; Format: 32MS/32WS/32MD/32WD/32XD	Score: 21–17, 18–21, 21–12	
April 1	Malaysia Open (Draw): Host: Kuching, Malaysia; Level: Superseries Premier; Prize: $600,000; Format: 32MS/32WS/32MD/32WD/32XD	(China) Zheng Siwei (China) Chen Qingchen	(China) Lu Kai (China) Huang Yaqiong
April 1	Malaysia Open (Draw): Host: Kuching, Malaysia; Level: Superseries Premier; Prize: $600,000; Format: 32MS/32WS/32MD/32WD/32XD	Score: 21–15, 21–18	
April 1	Finnish Open: Host: Vantaa, Finland; Level: International Challenge; Prize: $20,000; Format: 32MS/32WS/32MD/32WD/32XD	(Denmark) Rasmus Gemke	(Japan) Yu Igarashi
April 1	Finnish Open: Host: Vantaa, Finland; Level: International Challenge; Prize: $20,000; Format: 32MS/32WS/32MD/32WD/32XD	Score: 21–17, 21–18	
April 1	Finnish Open: Host: Vantaa, Finland; Level: International Challenge; Prize: $20,000; Format: 32MS/32WS/32MD/32WD/32XD	(Japan) Shiori Saito	(Japan) Mako Urushizaki
April 1	Finnish Open: Host: Vantaa, Finland; Level: International Challenge; Prize: $20,000; Format: 32MS/32WS/32MD/32WD/32XD	Score: 21–8, 21–10	
April 1	Finnish Open: Host: Vantaa, Finland; Level: International Challenge; Prize: $20,000; Format: 32MS/32WS/32MD/32WD/32XD	(Chinese Taipei) Liao Min-chun (Chinese Taipei) Su Cheng-heng	(Japan) Kohei Gondo (Japan) Tatsuya Watanabe
April 1	Finnish Open: Host: Vantaa, Finland; Level: International Challenge; Prize: $20,000; Format: 32MS/32WS/32MD/32WD/32XD	Score: 21–16, 21–16	
April 1	Finnish Open: Host: Vantaa, Finland; Level: International Challenge; Prize: $20,000; Format: 32MS/32WS/32MD/32WD/32XD	(Japan) Misato Aratama (Japan) Akane Watanabe	(Japan) Chisato Hoshi (Japan) Naru Shinoya
April 1	Finnish Open: Host: Vantaa, Finland; Level: International Challenge; Prize: $20,000; Format: 32MS/32WS/32MD/32WD/32XD	Score: 21–18, 21–13	
April 1	Finnish Open: Host: Vantaa, Finland; Level: International Challenge; Prize: $20,000; Format: 32MS/32WS/32MD/32WD/32XD	(Chinese Taipei) Tseng Min-hao (Chinese Taipei) Hu Ling-fang	(Denmark) Mikkel Mikkelsen (Denmark) Mai Surrow
April 1	Finnish Open: Host: Vantaa, Finland; Level: International Challenge; Prize: $20,000; Format: 32MS/32WS/32MD/32WD/32XD	Score: 24–22, 21–16	
April 8	Singapore Open (Draw): Host: Singapore City, Singapore; Level: Superseries; Prize: $350,000; Format: 32MS/32WS/32MD/32WD/32XD	(India) B. Sai Praneeth	(India) Srikanth Kidambi
April 8	Singapore Open (Draw): Host: Singapore City, Singapore; Level: Superseries; Prize: $350,000; Format: 32MS/32WS/32MD/32WD/32XD	Score: 17–21, 21–17, 21–12	
April 8	Singapore Open (Draw): Host: Singapore City, Singapore; Level: Superseries; Prize: $350,000; Format: 32MS/32WS/32MD/32WD/32XD	(Chinese Taipei) Tai Tzu-ying	(Spain) Carolina Marín
April 8	Singapore Open (Draw): Host: Singapore City, Singapore; Level: Superseries; Prize: $350,000; Format: 32MS/32WS/32MD/32WD/32XD	Score: 21–15, 21–15	
April 8	Singapore Open (Draw): Host: Singapore City, Singapore; Level: Superseries; Prize: $350,000; Format: 32MS/32WS/32MD/32WD/32XD	(Denmark) Mathias Boe (Denmark) Carsten Mogensen	(China) Li Junhui (China) Liu Yuchen
April 8	Singapore Open (Draw): Host: Singapore City, Singapore; Level: Superseries; Prize: $350,000; Format: 32MS/32WS/32MD/32WD/32XD	Score: 21–13, 21–14	
April 8	Singapore Open (Draw): Host: Singapore City, Singapore; Level: Superseries; Prize: $350,000; Format: 32MS/32WS/32MD/32WD/32XD	(Denmark) Kamilla Rytter Juhl (Denmark) Christinna Pedersen	(Japan) Misaki Matsutomo (Japan) Ayaka Takahashi
April 8	Singapore Open (Draw): Host: Singapore City, Singapore; Level: Superseries; Prize: $350,000; Format: 32MS/32WS/32MD/32WD/32XD	Score: 21–18, 14–21, 21–15	
April 8	Singapore Open (Draw): Host: Singapore City, Singapore; Level: Superseries; Prize: $350,000; Format: 32MS/32WS/32MD/32WD/32XD	(China) Lu Kai (China) Huang Yaqiong	(Thailand) Dechapol Puavaranukroh (Thailand) Sapsiree Taerattanachai
April 8	Singapore Open (Draw): Host: Singapore City, Singapore; Level: Superseries; Prize: $350,000; Format: 32MS/32WS/32MD/32WD/32XD	Score: 19–21, 21–16, 21–11	
April 8	Croatian International: Host: Zagreb, Croatia; Level: Future Series; Prize: $500; Format: 32MS/32WS/32MD/16WD/32XD	(Finland) Kasper Lehikoinen	(Croatia) Zvonimir Đurkinjak
April 8	Croatian International: Host: Zagreb, Croatia; Level: Future Series; Prize: $500; Format: 32MS/32WS/32MD/16WD/32XD	Score: 21–14, 21–16	
April 8	Croatian International: Host: Zagreb, Croatia; Level: Future Series; Prize: $500; Format: 32MS/32WS/32MD/16WD/32XD	(Denmark) Anne Hald Jensen	(England) Georgina Bland
April 8	Croatian International: Host: Zagreb, Croatia; Level: Future Series; Prize: $500; Format: 32MS/32WS/32MD/16WD/32XD	Score: 22–20, 21–18	
April 8	Croatian International: Host: Zagreb, Croatia; Level: Future Series; Prize: $500; Format: 32MS/32WS/32MD/16WD/32XD	(Croatia) Zvonimir Đurkinjak (Croatia) Zvonimir Hölbling	(Croatia) Igor Čimbur (Thailand) Samatcha Tovannakasem
April 8	Croatian International: Host: Zagreb, Croatia; Level: Future Series; Prize: $500; Format: 32MS/32WS/32MD/16WD/32XD	Score: 21–17, 21–18	
April 8	Croatian International: Host: Zagreb, Croatia; Level: Future Series; Prize: $500; Format: 32MS/32WS/32MD/16WD/32XD	(Estonia) Kristin Kuuba (Estonia) Helina Rüütel	(Denmark) Anne Hald (Denmark) Lisa Kramer
April 8	Croatian International: Host: Zagreb, Croatia; Level: Future Series; Prize: $500; Format: 32MS/32WS/32MD/16WD/32XD	Score: 21–12, 21–9	
April 8	Croatian International: Host: Zagreb, Croatia; Level: Future Series; Prize: $500; Format: 32MS/32WS/32MD/16WD/32XD	(England) Matthew Clare (England) Victoria Williams	(Denmark) Rasmus Rylander (Denmark) Susan Ekelund
April 8	Croatian International: Host: Zagreb, Croatia; Level: Future Series; Prize: $500; Format: 32MS/32WS/32MD/16WD/32XD	Score: 21–9, 9–21, 21–10	
April 15	China Masters (Draw): Host: Changzhou, Jiangsu, China; Level: Grand Prix Gold; Prize: $150,000; Format: 64MS/32WS/32MD/32WD/32XD	(China) Tian Houwei	(China) Qiao Bin
April 15	China Masters (Draw): Host: Changzhou, Jiangsu, China; Level: Grand Prix Gold; Prize: $150,000; Format: 64MS/32WS/32MD/32WD/32XD	Score: 21–15, 15–21, 21–16	
April 15	China Masters (Draw): Host: Changzhou, Jiangsu, China; Level: Grand Prix Gold; Prize: $150,000; Format: 64MS/32WS/32MD/32WD/32XD	(Japan) Aya Ohori	(Japan) Saena Kawakami
April 15	China Masters (Draw): Host: Changzhou, Jiangsu, China; Level: Grand Prix Gold; Prize: $150,000; Format: 64MS/32WS/32MD/32WD/32XD	Score: 21–9, 9–21, 21–18	
April 15	China Masters (Draw): Host: Changzhou, Jiangsu, China; Level: Grand Prix Gold; Prize: $150,000; Format: 64MS/32WS/32MD/32WD/32XD	(Chinese Taipei) Chen Hung-ling (Chinese Taipei) Wang Chi-lin	(Japan) Takuto Inoue (Japan) Yuki Kaneko
April 15	China Masters (Draw): Host: Changzhou, Jiangsu, China; Level: Grand Prix Gold; Prize: $150,000; Format: 64MS/32WS/32MD/32WD/32XD	Score: 21–14, 21–6	
April 15	China Masters (Draw): Host: Changzhou, Jiangsu, China; Level: Grand Prix Gold; Prize: $150,000; Format: 64MS/32WS/32MD/32WD/32XD	(China) Bao Yixin (China) Yu Xiaohan	(China) Huang Yaqiong (China) Tang Jinhua
April 15	China Masters (Draw): Host: Changzhou, Jiangsu, China; Level: Grand Prix Gold; Prize: $150,000; Format: 64MS/32WS/32MD/32WD/32XD	Score: 8–21, 21–14, 21–17	
April 15	China Masters (Draw): Host: Changzhou, Jiangsu, China; Level: Grand Prix Gold; Prize: $150,000; Format: 64MS/32WS/32MD/32WD/32XD	(China) Wang Yilyu (China) Huang Dongping	(Chinese Taipei) Liao Min-chun (Chinese Taipei) Chen Hsiao-huan
April 15	China Masters (Draw): Host: Changzhou, Jiangsu, China; Level: Grand Prix Gold; Prize: $150,000; Format: 64MS/32WS/32MD/32WD/32XD	Score: 21–14, 21–10	
April 15	Peru International: Host: Lima, Peru; Level: International Challenge; Prize: $20,000; Format: 32MS/32WS/32MD/8WD/32XD	(Brazil) Ygor Coelho	(Italy) Rosario Maddaloni
April 15	Peru International: Host: Lima, Peru; Level: International Challenge; Prize: $20,000; Format: 32MS/32WS/32MD/8WD/32XD	Score: 21–12, 23–21	
April 15	Peru International: Host: Lima, Peru; Level: International Challenge; Prize: $20,000; Format: 32MS/32WS/32MD/8WD/32XD	(Canada) Michelle Li	(United States) Disha Gupta
April 15	Peru International: Host: Lima, Peru; Level: International Challenge; Prize: $20,000; Format: 32MS/32WS/32MD/8WD/32XD	Score: 21–10, 21–10	
April 15	Peru International: Host: Lima, Peru; Level: International Challenge; Prize: $20,000; Format: 32MS/32WS/32MD/8WD/32XD	(India) Alwin Francis (India) Tarun Kona	(Peru) Mario Cuba (Peru) Diego Mini
April 15	Peru International: Host: Lima, Peru; Level: International Challenge; Prize: $20,000; Format: 32MS/32WS/32MD/8WD/32XD	Score: 21–15, 21–15	
April 15	Peru International: Host: Lima, Peru; Level: International Challenge; Prize: $20,000; Format: 32MS/32WS/32MD/8WD/32XD	(Peru) Daniela Macías (Peru) Dánica Nishimura	(Brazil) Jaqueline Lima (Brazil) Sâmia Lima
April 15	Peru International: Host: Lima, Peru; Level: International Challenge; Prize: $20,000; Format: 32MS/32WS/32MD/8WD/32XD	Score: 21–19, 22–20	
April 15	Peru International: Host: Lima, Peru; Level: International Challenge; Prize: $20,000; Format: 32MS/32WS/32MD/8WD/32XD	(Peru) Mario Cuba (Peru) Katherine Winder	(Jamaica) Dennis Coke (Jamaica) Katherine Wynter
April 15	Peru International: Host: Lima, Peru; Level: International Challenge; Prize: $20,000; Format: 32MS/32WS/32MD/8WD/32XD	Score: 21–9, 21–9	
April 15	Dutch International: Host: Wateringen, Netherlands; Level: International Series; Prize: $10,000; Format: 32MS/32WS/32MD/32WD/32XD	(India) Anand Pawar	(Finland) Kalle Koljonen
April 15	Dutch International: Host: Wateringen, Netherlands; Level: International Series; Prize: $10,000; Format: 32MS/32WS/32MD/32WD/32XD	Score: 20–22, 21–19, 21–17	
April 15	Dutch International: Host: Wateringen, Netherlands; Level: International Series; Prize: $10,000; Format: 32MS/32WS/32MD/32WD/32XD	(Denmark) Irina Amalie Andersen	(Germany) Luise Heim
April 15	Dutch International: Host: Wateringen, Netherlands; Level: International Series; Prize: $10,000; Format: 32MS/32WS/32MD/32WD/32XD	Score: 18–21, 24–22, 21–18	
April 15	Dutch International: Host: Wateringen, Netherlands; Level: International Series; Prize: $10,000; Format: 32MS/32WS/32MD/32WD/32XD	(New Zealand) Oliver Leydon-Davis (Denmark) Lasse Mølhede	(Netherlands) Jim Middelburg (Netherlands) Russell Muns
April 15	Dutch International: Host: Wateringen, Netherlands; Level: International Series; Prize: $10,000; Format: 32MS/32WS/32MD/32WD/32XD	Score: 18–21, 21–10, 24–22	
April 15	Dutch International: Host: Wateringen, Netherlands; Level: International Series; Prize: $10,000; Format: 32MS/32WS/32MD/32WD/32XD	(Germany) Cisita Joity Jansen (Germany) Birgit Overzier	(Netherlands) Debora Jille (Netherlands) Imke van der Aar
April 15	Dutch International: Host: Wateringen, Netherlands; Level: International Series; Prize: $10,000; Format: 32MS/32WS/32MD/32WD/32XD	Score: 21–18, 21–18	
April 15	Dutch International: Host: Wateringen, Netherlands; Level: International Series; Prize: $10,000; Format: 32MS/32WS/32MD/32WD/32XD	(Finland) Anton Kaisti (Finland) Jenny Nyström	(Netherlands) Jim Middelburg (Netherlands) Myke Halkema
April 15	Dutch International: Host: Wateringen, Netherlands; Level: International Series; Prize: $10,000; Format: 32MS/32WS/32MD/32WD/32XD	Score: 21–18, 21–18	
April 15	African Mixed Team Championship (Draw): Host: Benoni, South Africa; Level: Continental Team Championships; Format: 9 teams (Round robin)	Egypt	South Africa
April 15	African Mixed Team Championship (Draw): Host: Benoni, South Africa; Level: Continental Team Championships; Format: 9 teams (Round robin)	Ahmed Salah / Menna El-Tanany; Hadia Hosny; Abdelrahman Abdelhakim; Doha Hany / Hadia Hosny; Ali Ahmed El-Khateeb / Adham Hatem Elgamal	Andries Malan / Jennifer Fry; Sandra le Grange; Cameron Coetzer; Michelle Butler-Emmett / Jennifer Fry; Andries Malan / James Hilton McManus
April 15	African Mixed Team Championship (Draw): Host: Benoni, South Africa; Level: Continental Team Championships; Format: 9 teams (Round robin)	Score: 3–1	
April 15	African Badminton Championships (Draw): Host: Benoni, South Africa; Level: Continental Championships; Format: 16MS/16WS/16MD/16WD/16XD	(Algeria) Adel Hamek	(Egypt) Ahmed Salah
April 15	African Badminton Championships (Draw): Host: Benoni, South Africa; Level: Continental Championships; Format: 16MS/16WS/16MD/16WD/16XD	Score: 21–19, 21–13	
April 15	African Badminton Championships (Draw): Host: Benoni, South Africa; Level: Continental Championships; Format: 16MS/16WS/16MD/16WD/16XD	(Mauritius) Kate Foo Kune	(Egypt) Hadia Hosny
April 15	African Badminton Championships (Draw): Host: Benoni, South Africa; Level: Continental Championships; Format: 16MS/16WS/16MD/16WD/16XD	Score: 16–21, 21–14, 21–8	
April 15	African Badminton Championships (Draw): Host: Benoni, South Africa; Level: Continental Championships; Format: 16MS/16WS/16MD/16WD/16XD	(Algeria) Koceila Mammeri (Algeria) Youcef Sabri Medel	(South Africa) Andries Malan (South Africa) James Hilton McManus
April 15	African Badminton Championships (Draw): Host: Benoni, South Africa; Level: Continental Championships; Format: 16MS/16WS/16MD/16WD/16XD	Score: 13–21, 21–19, 21–9	
April 15	African Badminton Championships (Draw): Host: Benoni, South Africa; Level: Continental Championships; Format: 16MS/16WS/16MD/16WD/16XD	(South Africa) Michelle Butler-Emmett (South Africa) Jennifer Fry	(Egypt) Doha Hany (Egypt) Hadia Hosny
April 15	African Badminton Championships (Draw): Host: Benoni, South Africa; Level: Continental Championships; Format: 16MS/16WS/16MD/16WD/16XD	Score: 21–12, 15–21, 21–12	
April 15	African Badminton Championships (Draw): Host: Benoni, South Africa; Level: Continental Championships; Format: 16MS/16WS/16MD/16WD/16XD	(South Africa) Andries Malan (South Africa) Jennifer Fry	(Mauritius) Georges Paul (Mauritius) Kate Foo Kune
April 15	African Badminton Championships (Draw): Host: Benoni, South Africa; Level: Continental Championships; Format: 16MS/16WS/16MD/16WD/16XD	Score: 21–19, 19–21, 21–19	
April 22	Badminton Asia Championships (Draw): Host: Wuhan, China; Level: Continental Championships; Prize: $325,000; Format: 32MS/32WS/32MD/32WD/32XD	(China) Chen Long	(China) Lin Dan
April 22	Badminton Asia Championships (Draw): Host: Wuhan, China; Level: Continental Championships; Prize: $325,000; Format: 32MS/32WS/32MD/32WD/32XD	Score: 21–23, 21–11, 21–10	
April 22	Badminton Asia Championships (Draw): Host: Wuhan, China; Level: Continental Championships; Prize: $325,000; Format: 32MS/32WS/32MD/32WD/32XD	(Chinese Taipei) Tai Tzu-ying	(Japan) Akane Yamaguchi
April 22	Badminton Asia Championships (Draw): Host: Wuhan, China; Level: Continental Championships; Prize: $325,000; Format: 32MS/32WS/32MD/32WD/32XD	Score: 18–21, 21–11, 21–18	
April 22	Badminton Asia Championships (Draw): Host: Wuhan, China; Level: Continental Championships; Prize: $325,000; Format: 32MS/32WS/32MD/32WD/32XD	(China) Li Junhui (China) Liu Yuchen	(China) Huang Kaixiang (China) Wang Yilyu
April 22	Badminton Asia Championships (Draw): Host: Wuhan, China; Level: Continental Championships; Prize: $325,000; Format: 32MS/32WS/32MD/32WD/32XD	Score: 21–14, 21–12	
April 22	Badminton Asia Championships (Draw): Host: Wuhan, China; Level: Continental Championships; Prize: $325,000; Format: 32MS/32WS/32MD/32WD/32XD	(Japan) Misaki Matsutomo (Japan) Ayaka Takahashi	(South Korea) Kim Hye-rin (South Korea) Yoo Hae-won
April 22	Badminton Asia Championships (Draw): Host: Wuhan, China; Level: Continental Championships; Prize: $325,000; Format: 32MS/32WS/32MD/32WD/32XD	Score: 21–19, 16–21, 21–10	
April 22	Badminton Asia Championships (Draw): Host: Wuhan, China; Level: Continental Championships; Prize: $325,000; Format: 32MS/32WS/32MD/32WD/32XD	(China) Lu Kai (China) Huang Yaqiong	(Thailand) Dechapol Puavaranukroh (Thailand) Sapsiree Taerattanachai
April 22	Badminton Asia Championships (Draw): Host: Wuhan, China; Level: Continental Championships; Prize: $325,000; Format: 32MS/32WS/32MD/32WD/32XD	Score: 21–18, 21–11	
April 22	European Badminton Championships (Draw): Host: Kolding, Denmark; Level: Continental Championships; Format: 64MS/64WS/32MD/32WD/32XD	(England) Rajiv Ouseph	(Denmark) Anders Antonsen
April 22	European Badminton Championships (Draw): Host: Kolding, Denmark; Level: Continental Championships; Format: 64MS/64WS/32MD/32WD/32XD	Score: 21–19, 21–19	
April 22	European Badminton Championships (Draw): Host: Kolding, Denmark; Level: Continental Championships; Format: 64MS/64WS/32MD/32WD/32XD	(Spain) Carolina Marín	(Scotland) Kirsty Gilmour
April 22	European Badminton Championships (Draw): Host: Kolding, Denmark; Level: Continental Championships; Format: 64MS/64WS/32MD/32WD/32XD	Score: 21–14, 21–12	
April 22	European Badminton Championships (Draw): Host: Kolding, Denmark; Level: Continental Championships; Format: 64MS/64WS/32MD/32WD/32XD	(Denmark) Mathias Boe (Denmark) Carsten Mogensen	(Denmark) Mads Conrad-Petersen (Denmark) Mads Pieler Kolding
April 22	European Badminton Championships (Draw): Host: Kolding, Denmark; Level: Continental Championships; Format: 64MS/64WS/32MD/32WD/32XD	Score: 21–16, 22–20	
April 22	European Badminton Championships (Draw): Host: Kolding, Denmark; Level: Continental Championships; Format: 64MS/64WS/32MD/32WD/32XD	(Denmark) Kamilla Rytter Juhl (Denmark) Christinna Pedersen	(Bulgaria) Gabriela Stoeva (Bulgaria) Stefani Stoeva
April 22	European Badminton Championships (Draw): Host: Kolding, Denmark; Level: Continental Championships; Format: 64MS/64WS/32MD/32WD/32XD	Score: 21–11, 15–21, 21–11	
April 22	European Badminton Championships (Draw): Host: Kolding, Denmark; Level: Continental Championships; Format: 64MS/64WS/32MD/32WD/32XD	(England) Chris Adcock (England) Gabby Adcock	(Denmark) Joachim Fischer Nielsen (Denmark) Christinna Pedersen
April 22	European Badminton Championships (Draw): Host: Kolding, Denmark; Level: Continental Championships; Format: 64MS/64WS/32MD/32WD/32XD	Score: 21–17, 18–21, 21–19	
April 22	Pan Am Badminton Championships (Draw): Host: Habana, Cuba; Level: Continental Championships; Format: 64MS/32WS/32MD/16WD/32XD	(Brazil) Ygor Coelho	(Cuba) Osleni Guerrero
April 22	Pan Am Badminton Championships (Draw): Host: Habana, Cuba; Level: Continental Championships; Format: 64MS/32WS/32MD/16WD/32XD	Score: 12–21, 21–16, 21–10	
April 22	Pan Am Badminton Championships (Draw): Host: Habana, Cuba; Level: Continental Championships; Format: 64MS/32WS/32MD/16WD/32XD	(Canada) Rachel Honderich	(Canada) Brittney Tam
April 22	Pan Am Badminton Championships (Draw): Host: Habana, Cuba; Level: Continental Championships; Format: 64MS/32WS/32MD/16WD/32XD	Score: 21–8, 12–21, 21–7	
April 22	Pan Am Badminton Championships (Draw): Host: Habana, Cuba; Level: Continental Championships; Format: 64MS/32WS/32MD/16WD/32XD	(Canada) Jason Ho-Shue (Canada) Nyl Yakura	(Canada) Austin Bauer (Canada) Ty Alexander Lindeman
April 22	Pan Am Badminton Championships (Draw): Host: Habana, Cuba; Level: Continental Championships; Format: 64MS/32WS/32MD/16WD/32XD	Score: 21–18, 21–6	
April 22	Pan Am Badminton Championships (Draw): Host: Habana, Cuba; Level: Continental Championships; Format: 64MS/32WS/32MD/16WD/32XD	(Canada) Michelle Tong (Canada) Josephine Wu	(Peru) Daniela Macías (Peru) Dánica Nishimura
April 22	Pan Am Badminton Championships (Draw): Host: Habana, Cuba; Level: Continental Championships; Format: 64MS/32WS/32MD/16WD/32XD	Score: 21–11, 21–12	
April 22	Pan Am Badminton Championships (Draw): Host: Habana, Cuba; Level: Continental Championships; Format: 64MS/32WS/32MD/16WD/32XD	(Canada) Toby Ng (Canada) Rachel Honderich	(Canada) Nyl Yakura (Canada) Brittney Tam
April 22	Pan Am Badminton Championships (Draw): Host: Habana, Cuba; Level: Continental Championships; Format: 64MS/32WS/32MD/16WD/32XD	Score: 21–13, 21–14	

=== May ===
Week of	Tournament	Champions	Runners-up
May 1	Smiling Fish International: Host: Trang, Thailand; Level: International Challenge; Prize: $20,000; Format: 64MS/32WS/32MD/32WD/32XD	(Thailand) Pannawit Thongnuam	(Japan) Riichi Takeshita
May 1	Smiling Fish International: Host: Trang, Thailand; Level: International Challenge; Prize: $20,000; Format: 64MS/32WS/32MD/32WD/32XD	Score: 21–19, 24–22	
May 1	Smiling Fish International: Host: Trang, Thailand; Level: International Challenge; Prize: $20,000; Format: 64MS/32WS/32MD/32WD/32XD	(China) Hui Xirui	(Japan) Natsuki Nidaira
May 1	Smiling Fish International: Host: Trang, Thailand; Level: International Challenge; Prize: $20,000; Format: 64MS/32WS/32MD/32WD/32XD	Score: 21–10, 15–21, 21–19	
May 1	Smiling Fish International: Host: Trang, Thailand; Level: International Challenge; Prize: $20,000; Format: 64MS/32WS/32MD/32WD/32XD	(China) Kang Jun (China) Zhang Sijie	(Malaysia) Nur Mohd Azriyn Ayub (Malaysia) Jagdish Singh
May 1	Smiling Fish International: Host: Trang, Thailand; Level: International Challenge; Prize: $20,000; Format: 64MS/32WS/32MD/32WD/32XD	Score: 21–15, 21–15	
May 1	Smiling Fish International: Host: Trang, Thailand; Level: International Challenge; Prize: $20,000; Format: 64MS/32WS/32MD/32WD/32XD	(Japan) Nami Matsuyama (Japan) Chiharu Shida	(Japan) Chisato Hoshi (Japan) Naru Shinoya
May 1	Smiling Fish International: Host: Trang, Thailand; Level: International Challenge; Prize: $20,000; Format: 64MS/32WS/32MD/32WD/32XD	Score: 21–19, 21–14	
May 1	Smiling Fish International: Host: Trang, Thailand; Level: International Challenge; Prize: $20,000; Format: 64MS/32WS/32MD/32WD/32XD	(China) Wang Sijie (China) Du Peng	(Indonesia) Lukhi Apri Nugroho (Indonesia) Ririn Amelia
May 1	Smiling Fish International: Host: Trang, Thailand; Level: International Challenge; Prize: $20,000; Format: 64MS/32WS/32MD/32WD/32XD	Score: 21–14, 21–12	
May 1	Hellas International: Host: Sidirokastro, Greece; Level: Future Series; Prize: TBC; Format: 32MS/32WS/32MD/16WD/32XD	(Denmark) Kim Bruun	(Bulgaria) Ivan Rusev
May 1	Hellas International: Host: Sidirokastro, Greece; Level: Future Series; Prize: TBC; Format: 32MS/32WS/32MD/16WD/32XD	Score: 21–9, 21–18	
May 1	Hellas International: Host: Sidirokastro, Greece; Level: Future Series; Prize: TBC; Format: 32MS/32WS/32MD/16WD/32XD	(Turkey) Aliye Demirbag	(Turkey) Busra Yalçinkaya
May 1	Hellas International: Host: Sidirokastro, Greece; Level: Future Series; Prize: TBC; Format: 32MS/32WS/32MD/16WD/32XD	Score: 21–13, 21–11	
May 1	Hellas International: Host: Sidirokastro, Greece; Level: Future Series; Prize: TBC; Format: 32MS/32WS/32MD/16WD/32XD	(Bulgaria) Daniel Nikolov (Bulgaria) Ivan Rusev	(Germany) Daniel Benz (Germany) Andreas Heinz
May 1	Hellas International: Host: Sidirokastro, Greece; Level: Future Series; Prize: TBC; Format: 32MS/32WS/32MD/16WD/32XD	Score: 21–15, 11–21, 23–21	
May 1	Hellas International: Host: Sidirokastro, Greece; Level: Future Series; Prize: TBC; Format: 32MS/32WS/32MD/16WD/32XD	(Russia) Ekaterina Kut (Russia) Daria Serebriakova	(Romania) Madalina Ilie (Romania) Milu Luiza
May 1	Hellas International: Host: Sidirokastro, Greece; Level: Future Series; Prize: TBC; Format: 32MS/32WS/32MD/16WD/32XD	Score: 21–12, 21–7	
May 1	Hellas International: Host: Sidirokastro, Greece; Level: Future Series; Prize: TBC; Format: 32MS/32WS/32MD/16WD/32XD	(Turkey) Osman Uyhan (Turkey) Aliye Demirbag	(Turkey) Serdar Koca (Turkey) Emine Demirtaş
May 1	Hellas International: Host: Sidirokastro, Greece; Level: Future Series; Prize: TBC; Format: 32MS/32WS/32MD/16WD/32XD	Score: 21–16, 21–14	
May 8	Indonesia International: Host: Surabaya, Indonesia; Level: International Series; Prize: $10,000; Format: 64MS/32WS/32MD/32WD/32XD	(Indonesia) Shesar Hiren Rhustavito	(Indonesia) Dionysius Hayom Rumbaka
May 8	Indonesia International: Host: Surabaya, Indonesia; Level: International Series; Prize: $10,000; Format: 64MS/32WS/32MD/32WD/32XD	Score: 11–4 (retired)	
May 8	Indonesia International: Host: Surabaya, Indonesia; Level: International Series; Prize: $10,000; Format: 64MS/32WS/32MD/32WD/32XD	(Malaysia) Selvaduray Kisona	(Indonesia) Gregoria Mariska Tunjung
May 8	Indonesia International: Host: Surabaya, Indonesia; Level: International Series; Prize: $10,000; Format: 64MS/32WS/32MD/32WD/32XD	Score: 10–21, 21–16, 21–19	
May 8	Indonesia International: Host: Surabaya, Indonesia; Level: International Series; Prize: $10,000; Format: 64MS/32WS/32MD/32WD/32XD	(Indonesia) Wahyu Nayaka Arya Pankaryanira (Indonesia) Ade Yusuf Santoso	(Indonesia) Kenas Adi Haryanto (Indonesia) Moh Reza Pahlevi Isfahani
May 8	Indonesia International: Host: Surabaya, Indonesia; Level: International Series; Prize: $10,000; Format: 64MS/32WS/32MD/32WD/32XD	Score: 21–18, 16–21, 21–19	
May 8	Indonesia International: Host: Surabaya, Indonesia; Level: International Series; Prize: $10,000; Format: 64MS/32WS/32MD/32WD/32XD	(Malaysia) Soong Fie Cho (Malaysia) Tee Jing Yi	(Indonesia) Dian Fitriani (Indonesia) Nadya Melati
May 8	Indonesia International: Host: Surabaya, Indonesia; Level: International Series; Prize: $10,000; Format: 64MS/32WS/32MD/32WD/32XD	Score: 21–16, 16–21, 21–19	
May 8	Indonesia International: Host: Surabaya, Indonesia; Level: International Series; Prize: $10,000; Format: 64MS/32WS/32MD/32WD/32XD	(China) Ou Xuanyi (China) Liu Lin	(Indonesia) Lukhi Apri Nugroho (Indonesia) Ririn Amelia
May 8	Indonesia International: Host: Surabaya, Indonesia; Level: International Series; Prize: $10,000; Format: 64MS/32WS/32MD/32WD/32XD	Score: 22–20, 21–11	
May 8	Slovenia International: Host: Medvode, Slovenia; Level: International Series; Prize: $8,000; Format: 32MS/32WS/32MD/32WD/32XD	(Netherlands) Erik Meijs	(Indonesia) Adi Pratama
May 8	Slovenia International: Host: Medvode, Slovenia; Level: International Series; Prize: $8,000; Format: 32MS/32WS/32MD/32WD/32XD	Score: 21–14, 14–21, 21–17	
May 8	Slovenia International: Host: Medvode, Slovenia; Level: International Series; Prize: $8,000; Format: 32MS/32WS/32MD/32WD/32XD	(Denmark) Julie Dawall Jakobsen	(China) Qi Xuefei
May 8	Slovenia International: Host: Medvode, Slovenia; Level: International Series; Prize: $8,000; Format: 32MS/32WS/32MD/32WD/32XD	Score: 21–19, 21–14	
May 8	Slovenia International: Host: Medvode, Slovenia; Level: International Series; Prize: $8,000; Format: 32MS/32WS/32MD/32WD/32XD	(Belgium) Matijs Dierickx (Belgium) Freek Golinski	(Denmark) Jeppe Bay (Denmark) Rasmus Kjær
May 8	Slovenia International: Host: Medvode, Slovenia; Level: International Series; Prize: $8,000; Format: 32MS/32WS/32MD/32WD/32XD	Score: 21–13, 21–16	
May 8	Slovenia International: Host: Medvode, Slovenia; Level: International Series; Prize: $8,000; Format: 32MS/32WS/32MD/32WD/32XD	(Russia) Olga Arkhangelskaya (Russia) Natalia Rogova	(England) Jenny Moore (England) Victoria Williams
May 8	Slovenia International: Host: Medvode, Slovenia; Level: International Series; Prize: $8,000; Format: 32MS/32WS/32MD/32WD/32XD	Score: 22–20, 21–17	
May 8	Slovenia International: Host: Medvode, Slovenia; Level: International Series; Prize: $8,000; Format: 32MS/32WS/32MD/32WD/32XD	(Denmark) Mikkel Mikkelsen (Denmark) Mai Surrow	(England) Gregory Mairs (England) Jenny Moore
May 8	Slovenia International: Host: Medvode, Slovenia; Level: International Series; Prize: $8,000; Format: 32MS/32WS/32MD/32WD/32XD	Score: 21–12, 21–13	
May 15	Czech International: Host: Karviná, Czech Republic; Level: Future Series; Prize: $3,160; Format: 32MS/32WS/32MD/16WD/16XD	(Czech Republic) Milan Ludík	(Israel) Daniel Chislov
May 15	Czech International: Host: Karviná, Czech Republic; Level: Future Series; Prize: $3,160; Format: 32MS/32WS/32MD/16WD/16XD	Score: 21–19, 21–15	
May 15	Czech International: Host: Karviná, Czech Republic; Level: Future Series; Prize: $3,160; Format: 32MS/32WS/32MD/16WD/16XD	(Chinese Taipei) Lin Sih-yun	(Ukraine) Maryna Ilyinskaya
May 15	Czech International: Host: Karviná, Czech Republic; Level: Future Series; Prize: $3,160; Format: 32MS/32WS/32MD/16WD/16XD	Score: 21–9, 21–11	
May 15	Czech International: Host: Karviná, Czech Republic; Level: Future Series; Prize: $3,160; Format: 32MS/32WS/32MD/16WD/16XD	(Poland) Lukasz Moren (Poland) Wojciech Szkudlarczyk	(Germany) Peter Lang (Germany) Thomas Legleitner
May 15	Czech International: Host: Karviná, Czech Republic; Level: Future Series; Prize: $3,160; Format: 32MS/32WS/32MD/16WD/16XD	Score: 23–21, 21–19	
May 15	Czech International: Host: Karviná, Czech Republic; Level: Future Series; Prize: $3,160; Format: 32MS/32WS/32MD/16WD/16XD	(Ukraine) Maryna Ilyinskaya (Ukraine) Yelyzaveta Zharka	(Estonia) Kristin Kuuba (Estonia) Helina Rüütel
May 15	Czech International: Host: Karviná, Czech Republic; Level: Future Series; Prize: $3,160; Format: 32MS/32WS/32MD/16WD/16XD	Score: 13–21, 21–19, 21–16	
May 15	Czech International: Host: Karviná, Czech Republic; Level: Future Series; Prize: $3,160; Format: 32MS/32WS/32MD/16WD/16XD	(Czech Republic) Jakub Bitman (Czech Republic) Alžběta Bášová	(Czech Republic) Filip Budzel (Czech Republic) Tereza Švábíková
May 15	Czech International: Host: Karviná, Czech Republic; Level: Future Series; Prize: $3,160; Format: 32MS/32WS/32MD/16WD/16XD	Score: 21–19, 19–21, 21–17	
May 21	Sudirman Cup (Draw): Host: Gold Coast, Australia; Level: World Mixed Team Championships; Format: 32 teams	South Korea	China
May 21	Sudirman Cup (Draw): Host: Gold Coast, Australia; Level: World Mixed Team Championships; Format: 32 teams	Choi Sol-gyu / Seo Seung-jae; Sung Ji-hyun; Jeon Hyeok-jin; Chang Ye-na / Lee So-hee; Choi Sol-gyu / Chae Yoo-jung	Fu Haifeng / Zhang Nan; He Bingjiao; Chen Long; Chen Qingchen / Jia Yifan; Lu Kai / Huang Yaqiong
May 21	Sudirman Cup (Draw): Host: Gold Coast, Australia; Level: World Mixed Team Championships; Format: 32 teams	Score: 3–2	
May 21	Romanian International: Host: Timișoara, Romania; Level: Future Series; Prize: TBC; Format: 32MS/32WS/32MD/16WD/32XD	(Spain) Luís Enrique Peñalver	(France) Pierrick Cajot
May 21	Romanian International: Host: Timișoara, Romania; Level: Future Series; Prize: TBC; Format: 32MS/32WS/32MD/16WD/32XD	Score: 21–15, 21–17	
May 21	Romanian International: Host: Timișoara, Romania; Level: Future Series; Prize: TBC; Format: 32MS/32WS/32MD/16WD/32XD	(Spain) Clara Azurmendi	(Denmark) Anne Hald Jensen
May 21	Romanian International: Host: Timișoara, Romania; Level: Future Series; Prize: TBC; Format: 32MS/32WS/32MD/16WD/32XD	Score: Walkover	
May 21	Romanian International: Host: Timișoara, Romania; Level: Future Series; Prize: TBC; Format: 32MS/32WS/32MD/16WD/32XD	(Slovenia) Andraz Krapez (Thailand) Samatcha Tovannakasem	(Bulgaria) Daniel Nikolov (Bulgaria) Ivan Rusev
May 21	Romanian International: Host: Timișoara, Romania; Level: Future Series; Prize: TBC; Format: 32MS/32WS/32MD/16WD/32XD	Score: 21–15, 21–15	
May 21	Romanian International: Host: Timișoara, Romania; Level: Future Series; Prize: TBC; Format: 32MS/32WS/32MD/16WD/32XD	(South Korea) Hwang Yu-mi (South Korea) Kang Chan-hee	(South Korea) Lee Ji-hye (South Korea) Lim Soo-bin
May 21	Romanian International: Host: Timișoara, Romania; Level: Future Series; Prize: TBC; Format: 32MS/32WS/32MD/16WD/32XD	Score: 21–17, 19–21, 21–18	
May 21	Romanian International: Host: Timișoara, Romania; Level: Future Series; Prize: TBC; Format: 32MS/32WS/32MD/16WD/32XD	(Germany) Lukas Resch (Germany) Miranda Wilson	(Czech Republic) Filip Budzel (Czech Republic) Tereza Švábíková
May 21	Romanian International: Host: Timișoara, Romania; Level: Future Series; Prize: TBC; Format: 32MS/32WS/32MD/16WD/32XD	Score: 15–21, 21–16, 25–23	
May 28	Thailand Open (Draw): Host: Bangkok, Thailand; Level: Grand Prix Gold; Prize: $120,000; Format: 64MS/32WS/32MD/32WD/32XD	(India) B. Sai Praneeth	(Indonesia) Jonatan Christie
May 28	Thailand Open (Draw): Host: Bangkok, Thailand; Level: Grand Prix Gold; Prize: $120,000; Format: 64MS/32WS/32MD/32WD/32XD	Score: 17–21, 21–18, 21–19	
May 28	Thailand Open (Draw): Host: Bangkok, Thailand; Level: Grand Prix Gold; Prize: $120,000; Format: 64MS/32WS/32MD/32WD/32XD	(Thailand) Ratchanok Intanon	(Thailand) Busanan Ongbamrungphan
May 28	Thailand Open (Draw): Host: Bangkok, Thailand; Level: Grand Prix Gold; Prize: $120,000; Format: 64MS/32WS/32MD/32WD/32XD	Score: 21–18, 12–21, 21–16	
May 28	Thailand Open (Draw): Host: Bangkok, Thailand; Level: Grand Prix Gold; Prize: $120,000; Format: 64MS/32WS/32MD/32WD/32XD	(Indonesia) Berry Angriawan (Indonesia) Hardianto	(Germany) Raphael Beck (Germany) Peter Käsbauer
May 28	Thailand Open (Draw): Host: Bangkok, Thailand; Level: Grand Prix Gold; Prize: $120,000; Format: 64MS/32WS/32MD/32WD/32XD	Score: 21–16, 21–16	
May 28	Thailand Open (Draw): Host: Bangkok, Thailand; Level: Grand Prix Gold; Prize: $120,000; Format: 64MS/32WS/32MD/32WD/32XD	(Indonesia) Greysia Polii (Indonesia) Apriyani Rahayu	(Thailand) Chayanit Chaladchalam (Thailand) Phataimas Muenwong
May 28	Thailand Open (Draw): Host: Bangkok, Thailand; Level: Grand Prix Gold; Prize: $120,000; Format: 64MS/32WS/32MD/32WD/32XD	Score: 21–12, 21–12	
May 28	Thailand Open (Draw): Host: Bangkok, Thailand; Level: Grand Prix Gold; Prize: $120,000; Format: 64MS/32WS/32MD/32WD/32XD	(China) He Jiting (China) Du Yue	(Malaysia) Goh Soon Huat (Malaysia) Shevon Jemie Lai
May 28	Thailand Open (Draw): Host: Bangkok, Thailand; Level: Grand Prix Gold; Prize: $120,000; Format: 64MS/32WS/32MD/32WD/32XD	Score: 21–13, 16–21, 21–12	
May 28	Latvia International: Host: Jelgava, Latvia; Level: Future Series; Prize: TBC; Format: 32MS/32WS/32MD/32WD/32XD	(Germany) Kai Schaefer	(Finland) Kasper Lehikoinen
May 28	Latvia International: Host: Jelgava, Latvia; Level: Future Series; Prize: TBC; Format: 32MS/32WS/32MD/32WD/32XD	Score: 21–11, 21–14	
May 28	Latvia International: Host: Jelgava, Latvia; Level: Future Series; Prize: TBC; Format: 32MS/32WS/32MD/32WD/32XD	(China) Qi Xuefei	(Russia) Olga Arkhangelskaya
May 28	Latvia International: Host: Jelgava, Latvia; Level: Future Series; Prize: TBC; Format: 32MS/32WS/32MD/32WD/32XD	Score: 21–19, 21–6	
May 28	Latvia International: Host: Jelgava, Latvia; Level: Future Series; Prize: TBC; Format: 32MS/32WS/32MD/32WD/32XD	(Estonia) Kristjan Kaljurand (Estonia) Raul Kasner	(France) Mathieu Gangloff (France) Tom Rodrigues
May 28	Latvia International: Host: Jelgava, Latvia; Level: Future Series; Prize: TBC; Format: 32MS/32WS/32MD/32WD/32XD	Score: 21–15, 21–19	
May 28	Latvia International: Host: Jelgava, Latvia; Level: Future Series; Prize: TBC; Format: 32MS/32WS/32MD/32WD/32XD	(Russia) Olga Arkhangelskaya (Russia) Natalia Rogova	(Estonia) Kristin Kuuba (Estonia) Helina Rüütel
May 28	Latvia International: Host: Jelgava, Latvia; Level: Future Series; Prize: TBC; Format: 32MS/32WS/32MD/32WD/32XD	Score: 18–21, 21–13, 21–19	
May 28	Latvia International: Host: Jelgava, Latvia; Level: Future Series; Prize: TBC; Format: 32MS/32WS/32MD/32WD/32XD	(France) Fabien Delrue (France) Juliette Moinard	(Czech Republic) Filip Budzel (Czech Republic) Tereza Svabikova
May 28	Latvia International: Host: Jelgava, Latvia; Level: Future Series; Prize: TBC; Format: 32MS/32WS/32MD/32WD/32XD	Score: 21–12, 19–21, 21–11	

=== June ===
Week of	Tournament	Champions	Runners-up
June 4	Lithuanian International: Host: Kaunas, Lithuania; Level: Future Series; Prize: TBC; Format: 32MS/32WS/32MD/32WD/32XD	(Germany) Kai Schaefer	(France) Leo Rossi
June 4	Lithuanian International: Host: Kaunas, Lithuania; Level: Future Series; Prize: TBC; Format: 32MS/32WS/32MD/32WD/32XD	Score: 21–17, 21–14	
June 4	Lithuanian International: Host: Kaunas, Lithuania; Level: Future Series; Prize: TBC; Format: 32MS/32WS/32MD/32WD/32XD	(Denmark) Anne Hald	(Czech Republic) Tereza Švábíková
June 4	Lithuanian International: Host: Kaunas, Lithuania; Level: Future Series; Prize: TBC; Format: 32MS/32WS/32MD/32WD/32XD	Score: 21–18, 3–0 (retired)	
June 4	Lithuanian International: Host: Kaunas, Lithuania; Level: Future Series; Prize: TBC; Format: 32MS/32WS/32MD/32WD/32XD	(Belgium) Elias Bracke (France) Leo Rossi	(Poland) Lukasz Moren (Poland) Wojciech Szkudlarczyk
June 4	Lithuanian International: Host: Kaunas, Lithuania; Level: Future Series; Prize: TBC; Format: 32MS/32WS/32MD/32WD/32XD	Score: 21–19, 21–18	
June 4	Lithuanian International: Host: Kaunas, Lithuania; Level: Future Series; Prize: TBC; Format: 32MS/32WS/32MD/32WD/32XD	(Estonia) Kristin Kuuba (Estonia) Helina Rüütel	(Denmark) Anne Hald (Denmark) Lisa Kramer
June 4	Lithuanian International: Host: Kaunas, Lithuania; Level: Future Series; Prize: TBC; Format: 32MS/32WS/32MD/32WD/32XD	Score: 21–11, 21–13	
June 4	Lithuanian International: Host: Kaunas, Lithuania; Level: Future Series; Prize: TBC; Format: 32MS/32WS/32MD/32WD/32XD	(Republic of Ireland) Ciaran Chambers (Republic of Ireland) Sinead Chambers	(Czech Republic) Filip Budzel (Czech Republic) Tereza Švábíková
June 4	Lithuanian International: Host: Kaunas, Lithuania; Level: Future Series; Prize: TBC; Format: 32MS/32WS/32MD/32WD/32XD	Score: 17–21, 21–18, 21–18	
June 11	Indonesia Open (Draw): Host: Jakarta, Indonesia; Level: Superseries Premier; Prize: $1,000,000; Format: 32MS/32WS/32MD/32WD/32XD	(India) Srikanth Kidambi	(Japan) Kazumasa Sakai
June 11	Indonesia Open (Draw): Host: Jakarta, Indonesia; Level: Superseries Premier; Prize: $1,000,000; Format: 32MS/32WS/32MD/32WD/32XD	Score: 21–11, 21–19	
June 11	Indonesia Open (Draw): Host: Jakarta, Indonesia; Level: Superseries Premier; Prize: $1,000,000; Format: 32MS/32WS/32MD/32WD/32XD	(Japan) Sayaka Sato	(South Korea) Sung Ji-hyun
June 11	Indonesia Open (Draw): Host: Jakarta, Indonesia; Level: Superseries Premier; Prize: $1,000,000; Format: 32MS/32WS/32MD/32WD/32XD	Score: 21–13, 17–21, 21–14	
June 11	Indonesia Open (Draw): Host: Jakarta, Indonesia; Level: Superseries Premier; Prize: $1,000,000; Format: 32MS/32WS/32MD/32WD/32XD	(China) Li Junhui (China) Liu Yuchen	(Denmark) Mathias Boe (Denmark) Carsten Mogensen
June 11	Indonesia Open (Draw): Host: Jakarta, Indonesia; Level: Superseries Premier; Prize: $1,000,000; Format: 32MS/32WS/32MD/32WD/32XD	Score: 21–19, 19–21, 21–18	
June 11	Indonesia Open (Draw): Host: Jakarta, Indonesia; Level: Superseries Premier; Prize: $1,000,000; Format: 32MS/32WS/32MD/32WD/32XD	(China) Chen Qingchen (China) Jia Yifan	(South Korea) Chang Ye-na (South Korea) Lee So-hee
June 11	Indonesia Open (Draw): Host: Jakarta, Indonesia; Level: Superseries Premier; Prize: $1,000,000; Format: 32MS/32WS/32MD/32WD/32XD	Score: 21–19, 15–21, 21–10	
June 11	Indonesia Open (Draw): Host: Jakarta, Indonesia; Level: Superseries Premier; Prize: $1,000,000; Format: 32MS/32WS/32MD/32WD/32XD	(Indonesia) Tontowi Ahmad (Indonesia) Liliyana Natsir	(China) Zheng Siwei (China) Chen Qingchen
June 11	Indonesia Open (Draw): Host: Jakarta, Indonesia; Level: Superseries Premier; Prize: $1,000,000; Format: 32MS/32WS/32MD/32WD/32XD	Score: 22–20, 21–15	
June 11	Spanish International: Host: Madrid, Spain; Level: International Challenge; Prize: $20,000; Format: 32MS/32WS/32MD/32WD/32XD	(Japan) Yu Igarashi	(Spain) Luís Enrique Peñalver
June 11	Spanish International: Host: Madrid, Spain; Level: International Challenge; Prize: $20,000; Format: 32MS/32WS/32MD/32WD/32XD	Score: 21–13, 21–14	
June 11	Spanish International: Host: Madrid, Spain; Level: International Challenge; Prize: $20,000; Format: 32MS/32WS/32MD/32WD/32XD	(Denmark) Mia Blichfeldt	(Russia) Evgeniya Kosetskaya
June 11	Spanish International: Host: Madrid, Spain; Level: International Challenge; Prize: $20,000; Format: 32MS/32WS/32MD/32WD/32XD	Score: 21–12, 21–12	
June 11	Spanish International: Host: Madrid, Spain; Level: International Challenge; Prize: $20,000; Format: 32MS/32WS/32MD/32WD/32XD	(Netherlands) Jacco Arends (Netherlands) Ruben Jille	(Japan) Keiichiro Matsui (Japan) Yoshinori Takeuchi
June 11	Spanish International: Host: Madrid, Spain; Level: International Challenge; Prize: $20,000; Format: 32MS/32WS/32MD/32WD/32XD	Score: 21–17, 21–19	
June 11	Spanish International: Host: Madrid, Spain; Level: International Challenge; Prize: $20,000; Format: 32MS/32WS/32MD/32WD/32XD	(Japan) Ayako Sakuramoto (Japan) Yukiko Takahata	(Japan) Misato Aratama (Japan) Akane Watanabe
June 11	Spanish International: Host: Madrid, Spain; Level: International Challenge; Prize: $20,000; Format: 32MS/32WS/32MD/32WD/32XD	Score: 21–10, 21–15	
June 11	Spanish International: Host: Madrid, Spain; Level: International Challenge; Prize: $20,000; Format: 32MS/32WS/32MD/32WD/32XD	(Republic of Ireland) Sam Magee (Republic of Ireland) Chloe Magee	(Netherlands) Robin Tabeling (Netherlands) Cheryl Seinen
June 11	Spanish International: Host: Madrid, Spain; Level: International Challenge; Prize: $20,000; Format: 32MS/32WS/32MD/32WD/32XD	Score: 21–11, 21–18	
June 11	Mauritius International: Host: Rose Hill, Mauritius; Level: International Series; Prize: $8,000; Format: 32MS/32WS/32MD/16WD/32XD	(Malaysia) Goh Giap Chin	(Israel) Misha Zilberman
June 11	Mauritius International: Host: Rose Hill, Mauritius; Level: International Series; Prize: $8,000; Format: 32MS/32WS/32MD/16WD/32XD	Score: 21–19, 21–14	
June 11	Mauritius International: Host: Rose Hill, Mauritius; Level: International Series; Prize: $8,000; Format: 32MS/32WS/32MD/16WD/32XD	(India) Shikha Gautam	(India) Anura Prabhudesai
June 11	Mauritius International: Host: Rose Hill, Mauritius; Level: International Series; Prize: $8,000; Format: 32MS/32WS/32MD/16WD/32XD	Score: 21–8, 17–21, 21–19	
June 11	Mauritius International: Host: Rose Hill, Mauritius; Level: International Series; Prize: $8,000; Format: 32MS/32WS/32MD/16WD/32XD	(Italy) Fabio Caponio (Italy) Giovanni Toti	(Mauritius) Aatish Lubah (Mauritius) Georges Julien Paul
June 11	Mauritius International: Host: Rose Hill, Mauritius; Level: International Series; Prize: $8,000; Format: 32MS/32WS/32MD/16WD/32XD	Score: 13–21, 23–21, 21–16	
June 11	Mauritius International: Host: Rose Hill, Mauritius; Level: International Series; Prize: $8,000; Format: 32MS/32WS/32MD/16WD/32XD	(Germany) Lisa Kaminski (Germany) Hannah Pohl	(India) Sanyogita Ghorpade (India) Prajakta Sawant
June 11	Mauritius International: Host: Rose Hill, Mauritius; Level: International Series; Prize: $8,000; Format: 32MS/32WS/32MD/16WD/32XD	Score: 21–18, 22–20	
June 11	Mauritius International: Host: Rose Hill, Mauritius; Level: International Series; Prize: $8,000; Format: 32MS/32WS/32MD/16WD/32XD	(Malaysia) Yogendran Khrishnan (India) Prajakta Sawant	(Germany) Jonathan Persson (Mauritius) Kate Foo Kune
June 11	Mauritius International: Host: Rose Hill, Mauritius; Level: International Series; Prize: $8,000; Format: 32MS/32WS/32MD/16WD/32XD	Score: 21–7, 21–17	
June 18	Australian Open (Draw): Host: Sydney, Australia; Level: Superseries; Prize: $750,000; Format: 32MS/32WS/32MD/32WD/32XD	(India) Srikanth Kidambi	(China) Chen Long
June 18	Australian Open (Draw): Host: Sydney, Australia; Level: Superseries; Prize: $750,000; Format: 32MS/32WS/32MD/32WD/32XD	Score: 22–20, 21–16	
June 18	Australian Open (Draw): Host: Sydney, Australia; Level: Superseries; Prize: $750,000; Format: 32MS/32WS/32MD/32WD/32XD	(Japan) Nozomi Okuhara	(Japan) Akane Yamaguchi
June 18	Australian Open (Draw): Host: Sydney, Australia; Level: Superseries; Prize: $750,000; Format: 32MS/32WS/32MD/32WD/32XD	Score: 21–12, 21–23, 21–17	
June 18	Australian Open (Draw): Host: Sydney, Australia; Level: Superseries; Prize: $750,000; Format: 32MS/32WS/32MD/32WD/32XD	(Japan) Takeshi Kamura (Japan) Keigo Sonoda	(Indonesia) Hendra Setiawan (Malaysia) Tan Boon Heong
June 18	Australian Open (Draw): Host: Sydney, Australia; Level: Superseries; Prize: $750,000; Format: 32MS/32WS/32MD/32WD/32XD	Score: 21–17, 21–19	
June 18	Australian Open (Draw): Host: Sydney, Australia; Level: Superseries; Prize: $750,000; Format: 32MS/32WS/32MD/32WD/32XD	(Japan) Misaki Matsutomo (Japan) Ayaka Takahashi	(Denmark) Kamilla Rytter Juhl (Denmark) Christinna Pedersen
June 18	Australian Open (Draw): Host: Sydney, Australia; Level: Superseries; Prize: $750,000; Format: 32MS/32WS/32MD/32WD/32XD	Score: 21–10, 21–13	
June 18	Australian Open (Draw): Host: Sydney, Australia; Level: Superseries; Prize: $750,000; Format: 32MS/32WS/32MD/32WD/32XD	(China) Zheng Siwei (China) Chen Qingchen	(Indonesia) Praveen Jordan (Indonesia) Debby Susanto
June 18	Australian Open (Draw): Host: Sydney, Australia; Level: Superseries; Prize: $750,000; Format: 32MS/32WS/32MD/32WD/32XD	Score: 18–21, 21–14, 21–17	
June 18	Mongolia International: Host: Ulaanbaatar, Mongolia; Level: International Series; Prize: $8,000; Format: 32MS/16WS/16MD/8WD/8XD	(South Korea) Park Sung-min	(South Korea) Gu Mu-yeong
June 18	Mongolia International: Host: Ulaanbaatar, Mongolia; Level: International Series; Prize: $8,000; Format: 32MS/16WS/16MD/8WD/8XD	Score: 21–15, 13–21, 21–13	
June 18	Mongolia International: Host: Ulaanbaatar, Mongolia; Level: International Series; Prize: $8,000; Format: 32MS/16WS/16MD/8WD/8XD	(Vietnam) Nguyen Thuy Linh	(South Korea) Han So-yeon
June 18	Mongolia International: Host: Ulaanbaatar, Mongolia; Level: International Series; Prize: $8,000; Format: 32MS/16WS/16MD/8WD/8XD	Score: 21–18, 21–9	
June 18	Mongolia International: Host: Ulaanbaatar, Mongolia; Level: International Series; Prize: $8,000; Format: 32MS/16WS/16MD/8WD/8XD	(South Korea) Jung Jung-young (South Korea) Shin Hee-kwang	(South Korea) Jung Suk-hoon (South Korea) Lee Ji-su
June 18	Mongolia International: Host: Ulaanbaatar, Mongolia; Level: International Series; Prize: $8,000; Format: 32MS/16WS/16MD/8WD/8XD	Score: 21–12, 18–21, 21–11	
June 18	Mongolia International: Host: Ulaanbaatar, Mongolia; Level: International Series; Prize: $8,000; Format: 32MS/16WS/16MD/8WD/8XD	(South Korea) Han So-yeon (South Korea) Ko Hye-ryeon	(Mongolia) Khaliunaa Byambaa (Mongolia) Tegshzaya Choinkhor
June 18	Mongolia International: Host: Ulaanbaatar, Mongolia; Level: International Series; Prize: $8,000; Format: 32MS/16WS/16MD/8WD/8XD	Score: 21–16, 21–19	
June 18	Mongolia International: Host: Ulaanbaatar, Mongolia; Level: International Series; Prize: $8,000; Format: 32MS/16WS/16MD/8WD/8XD	(South Korea) Jung Jung-young (South Korea) Ko Hye-ryeon	(Mongolia) Olonbayar Enkhbat (Mongolia) Dashdondov Bulgamaa
June 18	Mongolia International: Host: Ulaanbaatar, Mongolia; Level: International Series; Prize: $8,000; Format: 32MS/16WS/16MD/8WD/8XD	Score: 21–11, 21–16	
June 25	Chinese Taipei Open (Draw): Host: Taipei, Chinese Taipei; Level: Grand Prix Gold; Prize: $200,000; Format: 64MS/32WS/32MD/32WD/32XD	(Chinese Taipei) Chou Tien-chen	(Chinese Taipei) Wang Tzu-wei
June 25	Chinese Taipei Open (Draw): Host: Taipei, Chinese Taipei; Level: Grand Prix Gold; Prize: $200,000; Format: 64MS/32WS/32MD/32WD/32XD	Score: 18–21, 21–19, 21–15	
June 25	Chinese Taipei Open (Draw): Host: Taipei, Chinese Taipei; Level: Grand Prix Gold; Prize: $200,000; Format: 64MS/32WS/32MD/32WD/32XD	(Japan) Saena Kawakami	(Malaysia) Goh Jin Wei
June 25	Chinese Taipei Open (Draw): Host: Taipei, Chinese Taipei; Level: Grand Prix Gold; Prize: $200,000; Format: 64MS/32WS/32MD/32WD/32XD	Score: 21–17, 21–17	
June 25	Chinese Taipei Open (Draw): Host: Taipei, Chinese Taipei; Level: Grand Prix Gold; Prize: $200,000; Format: 64MS/32WS/32MD/32WD/32XD	(Chinese Taipei) Chen Hung-ling (Chinese Taipei) Wang Chi-lin	(Chinese Taipei) Lee Jhe-huei (Chinese Taipei) Lee Yang
June 25	Chinese Taipei Open (Draw): Host: Taipei, Chinese Taipei; Level: Grand Prix Gold; Prize: $200,000; Format: 64MS/32WS/32MD/32WD/32XD	Score: 21–16, 22–20	
June 25	Chinese Taipei Open (Draw): Host: Taipei, Chinese Taipei; Level: Grand Prix Gold; Prize: $200,000; Format: 64MS/32WS/32MD/32WD/32XD	(South Korea) Chae Yoo-jung (South Korea) Kim So-yeong	(South Korea) Kim Hye-rin (South Korea) Yoo Hae-won
June 25	Chinese Taipei Open (Draw): Host: Taipei, Chinese Taipei; Level: Grand Prix Gold; Prize: $200,000; Format: 64MS/32WS/32MD/32WD/32XD	Score: 21–12, 21–11	
June 25	Chinese Taipei Open (Draw): Host: Taipei, Chinese Taipei; Level: Grand Prix Gold; Prize: $200,000; Format: 64MS/32WS/32MD/32WD/32XD	(South Korea) Seo Seung-jae (South Korea) Kim Ha-na	(Chinese Taipei) Wang Chi-lin (Chinese Taipei) Lee Chia-hsin
June 25	Chinese Taipei Open (Draw): Host: Taipei, Chinese Taipei; Level: Grand Prix Gold; Prize: $200,000; Format: 64MS/32WS/32MD/32WD/32XD	Score: 22–20, 21–10	
June 25	Guatemala Future Series: Host: Guatemala City, Guatemala; Level: Future Series; Prize: TBC; Format: 32MS/32WS/32MD/16WD/32XD	(India) Karan Rajan Rajarajan	(Guatemala) Heymard Humblers
June 25	Guatemala Future Series: Host: Guatemala City, Guatemala; Level: Future Series; Prize: TBC; Format: 32MS/32WS/32MD/16WD/32XD	Score: 21–19, 21–12	
June 25	Guatemala Future Series: Host: Guatemala City, Guatemala; Level: Future Series; Prize: TBC; Format: 32MS/32WS/32MD/16WD/32XD	(Guatemala) Nikté Sotomayor	(Peru) Fernanda Saponara Rivva
June 25	Guatemala Future Series: Host: Guatemala City, Guatemala; Level: Future Series; Prize: TBC; Format: 32MS/32WS/32MD/16WD/32XD	Score: 23–21, 21–18	
June 25	Guatemala Future Series: Host: Guatemala City, Guatemala; Level: Future Series; Prize: TBC; Format: 32MS/32WS/32MD/16WD/32XD	(Guatemala) Jonathan Solís (Guatemala) Rodolfo Ramírez	(Guatemala) Rubén Castellanos (Guatemala) Aníbal Marroquín
June 25	Guatemala Future Series: Host: Guatemala City, Guatemala; Level: Future Series; Prize: TBC; Format: 32MS/32WS/32MD/16WD/32XD	Score: 21–17, 21–13	
June 25	Guatemala Future Series: Host: Guatemala City, Guatemala; Level: Future Series; Prize: TBC; Format: 32MS/32WS/32MD/16WD/32XD	(Guatemala) Diana Corleto (Guatemala) Mariana Paiz	(Guatemala) Michele Barrios (Guatemala) Alejandra Paiz
June 25	Guatemala Future Series: Host: Guatemala City, Guatemala; Level: Future Series; Prize: TBC; Format: 32MS/32WS/32MD/16WD/32XD	Score: 21–11, 21–15	
June 25	Guatemala Future Series: Host: Guatemala City, Guatemala; Level: Future Series; Prize: TBC; Format: 32MS/32WS/32MD/16WD/32XD	(Guatemala) Jonathan Solís (Guatemala) Nikté Sotomayor	(El Salvador) Uriel Canjura (El Salvador) Fátima Centeno
June 25	Guatemala Future Series: Host: Guatemala City, Guatemala; Level: Future Series; Prize: TBC; Format: 32MS/32WS/32MD/16WD/32XD	Score: 21–15, 21–12	
June 25	Ivory Coast International: Host: Abidjan, Ivory Coast; Level: Future Series; Prize: TBC; Format: 32MS/32WS/32MD/16WD/32XD	(Nigeria) Anuoluwapo Juwon Opoyeri	(Jordan) Bahaedeen Ahmad Alshannik
June 25	Ivory Coast International: Host: Abidjan, Ivory Coast; Level: Future Series; Prize: TBC; Format: 32MS/32WS/32MD/16WD/32XD	Score: 21–18, 21–16	
June 25	Ivory Coast International: Host: Abidjan, Ivory Coast; Level: Future Series; Prize: TBC; Format: 32MS/32WS/32MD/16WD/32XD	(India) Ritika Thaker	(India) Simran Singhi
June 25	Ivory Coast International: Host: Abidjan, Ivory Coast; Level: Future Series; Prize: TBC; Format: 32MS/32WS/32MD/16WD/32XD	Score: 21–13, 21–19	
June 25	Ivory Coast International: Host: Abidjan, Ivory Coast; Level: Future Series; Prize: TBC; Format: 32MS/32WS/32MD/16WD/32XD	(Jordan) Bahaedeen Ahmad Alshannik (Jordan) Mohd Naser Mansour Nayef	(Egypt) Adham Hatem Elgamal (Egypt) Mohamed Mostafa Kamel
June 25	Ivory Coast International: Host: Abidjan, Ivory Coast; Level: Future Series; Prize: TBC; Format: 32MS/32WS/32MD/16WD/32XD	Score: 21–10, 21–16	
June 25	Ivory Coast International: Host: Abidjan, Ivory Coast; Level: Future Series; Prize: TBC; Format: 32MS/32WS/32MD/16WD/32XD	(India) Simran Singhi (India) Ritika Thaker	(Nigeria) Zainab Momoh (Nigeria) Peace Orji
June 25	Ivory Coast International: Host: Abidjan, Ivory Coast; Level: Future Series; Prize: TBC; Format: 32MS/32WS/32MD/16WD/32XD	Score: 21–11, 21–14	
June 25	Ivory Coast International: Host: Abidjan, Ivory Coast; Level: Future Series; Prize: TBC; Format: 32MS/32WS/32MD/16WD/32XD	(Nigeria) Enejoh Abah (Nigeria) Peace Orji	(Nigeria) Gideon Babalola (Nigeria) Uchechukwu Deborah Ukeh
June 25	Ivory Coast International: Host: Abidjan, Ivory Coast; Level: Future Series; Prize: TBC; Format: 32MS/32WS/32MD/16WD/32XD	Score: Walkover	

=== July ===
Week of	Tournament	Champions	Runners-up
July 2	White Nights: Host: Gatchina, Russia; Level: International Challenge; Prize: $20,000; Format: 64MS/64WS/32MD/32WD/32XD	(Spain) Pablo Abián	(France) Thomas Rouxel
July 2	White Nights: Host: Gatchina, Russia; Level: International Challenge; Prize: $20,000; Format: 64MS/64WS/32MD/32WD/32XD	Score: 15–21, 21–15, 21–18	
July 2	White Nights: Host: Gatchina, Russia; Level: International Challenge; Prize: $20,000; Format: 64MS/64WS/32MD/32WD/32XD	(Russia) Evgeniya Kosetskaya	(Turkey) Neslihan Yigit
July 2	White Nights: Host: Gatchina, Russia; Level: International Challenge; Prize: $20,000; Format: 64MS/64WS/32MD/32WD/32XD	Score: 21–8, 15–21, 22–20	
July 2	White Nights: Host: Gatchina, Russia; Level: International Challenge; Prize: $20,000; Format: 64MS/64WS/32MD/32WD/32XD	(Germany) Mark Lamsfuss (Germany) Marvin Emil Seidel	(Russia) Konstantin Abramov (Russia) Alexandr Zinchenko
July 2	White Nights: Host: Gatchina, Russia; Level: International Challenge; Prize: $20,000; Format: 64MS/64WS/32MD/32WD/32XD	Score: 23–21, 21–14	
July 2	White Nights: Host: Gatchina, Russia; Level: International Challenge; Prize: $20,000; Format: 64MS/64WS/32MD/32WD/32XD	(Russia) Anastasia Chervyakova (Russia) Olga Morozova	(France) Delphine Delrue (France) Léa Palermo
July 2	White Nights: Host: Gatchina, Russia; Level: International Challenge; Prize: $20,000; Format: 64MS/64WS/32MD/32WD/32XD	Score: 21–8, 21–15	
July 2	White Nights: Host: Gatchina, Russia; Level: International Challenge; Prize: $20,000; Format: 64MS/64WS/32MD/32WD/32XD	(Germany) Marvin Emil Seidel (Germany) Linda Efler	(Germany) Mark Lamsfuss (Germany) Isabel Herttrich
July 2	White Nights: Host: Gatchina, Russia; Level: International Challenge; Prize: $20,000; Format: 64MS/64WS/32MD/32WD/32XD	Score: 18–21, 21–16, 21–15	
July 2	Benin International: Host: Cotonou, Benin; Level: Future Series; Prize: TBC; Format: 32MS/32WS/32MD/16WD/32XD	(India) Sahil Sipani	(Nigeria) Habeeb Temitope Bello
July 2	Benin International: Host: Cotonou, Benin; Level: Future Series; Prize: TBC; Format: 32MS/32WS/32MD/16WD/32XD	Score: 21–11, 21–17	
July 2	Benin International: Host: Cotonou, Benin; Level: Future Series; Prize: TBC; Format: 32MS/32WS/32MD/16WD/32XD	(Nigeria) Dorcas Ajoke Adesokan	(Nigeria) Uchechukwu Deborah Ukeh
July 2	Benin International: Host: Cotonou, Benin; Level: Future Series; Prize: TBC; Format: 32MS/32WS/32MD/16WD/32XD	Score: 21–7, 21–18	
July 2	Benin International: Host: Cotonou, Benin; Level: Future Series; Prize: TBC; Format: 32MS/32WS/32MD/16WD/32XD	(Nigeria) Enejoh Abah (Nigeria) Ibrahim Adamu	(Jordan) Bahaedeen Ahmad Alshannik (Jordan) Mohd Naser Mansour Nayef
July 2	Benin International: Host: Cotonou, Benin; Level: Future Series; Prize: TBC; Format: 32MS/32WS/32MD/16WD/32XD	Score: 15–21, 21–19, 21–18	
July 2	Benin International: Host: Cotonou, Benin; Level: Future Series; Prize: TBC; Format: 32MS/32WS/32MD/16WD/32XD	(Nigeria) Dorcas Ajoke Adesokan (Nigeria) Tosin Damilola Atolagbe	(Nigeria) Peace Orji (Nigeria) Uchechukwu Deborah Ukeh
July 2	Benin International: Host: Cotonou, Benin; Level: Future Series; Prize: TBC; Format: 32MS/32WS/32MD/16WD/32XD	Score: 21–18, 16–21, 21–12	
July 2	Benin International: Host: Cotonou, Benin; Level: Future Series; Prize: TBC; Format: 32MS/32WS/32MD/16WD/32XD	(Nigeria) Enejoh Abah (Nigeria) Peace Orji	(Ghana) Emmanuel Donkor (Ghana) Stella Koteikai Amasah
July 2	Benin International: Host: Cotonou, Benin; Level: Future Series; Prize: TBC; Format: 32MS/32WS/32MD/16WD/32XD	Score: 21–14, 21–11	
July 9	Canada Open (Draw): Host: Calgary, Canada; Level: Grand Prix; Prize: $65,000; Format: 64MS/32WS/32MD/32WD/32XD	(Japan) Kanta Tsuneyama	(Japan) Kento Momota
July 9	Canada Open (Draw): Host: Calgary, Canada; Level: Grand Prix; Prize: $65,000; Format: 64MS/32WS/32MD/32WD/32XD	Score: 22–20, 14–21, 21–14	
July 9	Canada Open (Draw): Host: Calgary, Canada; Level: Grand Prix; Prize: $65,000; Format: 64MS/32WS/32MD/32WD/32XD	(Japan) Saena Kawakami	(Scotland) Kirsty Gilmour
July 9	Canada Open (Draw): Host: Calgary, Canada; Level: Grand Prix; Prize: $65,000; Format: 64MS/32WS/32MD/32WD/32XD	Score: 19–21, 21–19, 21–18	
July 9	Canada Open (Draw): Host: Calgary, Canada; Level: Grand Prix; Prize: $65,000; Format: 64MS/32WS/32MD/32WD/32XD	(England) Peter Briggs (England) Tom Wolfenden	(South Korea) Kim Won-ho (South Korea) Seo Seung-jae
July 9	Canada Open (Draw): Host: Calgary, Canada; Level: Grand Prix; Prize: $65,000; Format: 64MS/32WS/32MD/32WD/32XD	Score: 22–20, 16–21, 21–19	
July 9	Canada Open (Draw): Host: Calgary, Canada; Level: Grand Prix; Prize: $65,000; Format: 64MS/32WS/32MD/32WD/32XD	(Japan) Mayu Matsumoto (Japan) Wakana Nagahara	(Japan) Chisato Hoshi (Japan) Naru Shinoya
July 9	Canada Open (Draw): Host: Calgary, Canada; Level: Grand Prix; Prize: $65,000; Format: 64MS/32WS/32MD/32WD/32XD	Score: 21–16, 16–21, 21–18	
July 9	Canada Open (Draw): Host: Calgary, Canada; Level: Grand Prix; Prize: $65,000; Format: 64MS/32WS/32MD/32WD/32XD	(South Korea) Kim Won-ho (South Korea) Shin Seung-chan	(South Korea) Choi Sol-gyu (South Korea) Chae Yoo-jung
July 9	Canada Open (Draw): Host: Calgary, Canada; Level: Grand Prix; Prize: $65,000; Format: 64MS/32WS/32MD/32WD/32XD	Score: 21–19, 21–16	
July 9	Malaysia International Series: Host: Putrajaya, Malaysia; Level: International Series; Prize: $8,000; Format: 64MS/64WS/32MD/32WD/32XD	(Singapore) Loh Kean Yew	(Malaysia) Cheam June Wei
July 9	Malaysia International Series: Host: Putrajaya, Malaysia; Level: International Series; Prize: $8,000; Format: 64MS/64WS/32MD/32WD/32XD	Score: 21–19, 21–14	
July 9	Malaysia International Series: Host: Putrajaya, Malaysia; Level: International Series; Prize: $8,000; Format: 64MS/64WS/32MD/32WD/32XD	(Malaysia) Kisona Selvaduray	(Malaysia) Lee Ying Ying
July 9	Malaysia International Series: Host: Putrajaya, Malaysia; Level: International Series; Prize: $8,000; Format: 64MS/64WS/32MD/32WD/32XD	Score: 16–21, 21–15, 21–17	
July 9	Malaysia International Series: Host: Putrajaya, Malaysia; Level: International Series; Prize: $8,000; Format: 64MS/64WS/32MD/32WD/32XD	(Malaysia) Lee Jian Yi (Malaysia) Lim Zhen Ting	(Malaysia) Chen Tang Jie (Malaysia) Soh Wooi Yik
July 9	Malaysia International Series: Host: Putrajaya, Malaysia; Level: International Series; Prize: $8,000; Format: 64MS/64WS/32MD/32WD/32XD	Score: 24–22, 21–19	
July 9	Malaysia International Series: Host: Putrajaya, Malaysia; Level: International Series; Prize: $8,000; Format: 64MS/64WS/32MD/32WD/32XD	(Malaysia) Soong Fie Cho (Malaysia) Tee Jing Yi	(Thailand) Kittipak Dubthuk (Thailand) Natcha Saengchote
July 9	Malaysia International Series: Host: Putrajaya, Malaysia; Level: International Series; Prize: $8,000; Format: 64MS/64WS/32MD/32WD/32XD	Score: 21–16, 21–17	
July 9	Malaysia International Series: Host: Putrajaya, Malaysia; Level: International Series; Prize: $8,000; Format: 64MS/64WS/32MD/32WD/32XD	(Indonesia) Yantoni Edy Saputra (Indonesia) Marsheilla Gischa Islami	(India) Nandagopal Kidambi (India) Mahima Aggarwal
July 9	Malaysia International Series: Host: Putrajaya, Malaysia; Level: International Series; Prize: $8,000; Format: 64MS/64WS/32MD/32WD/32XD	Score: 21–19, 21–9	
July 9	Cameroon International: Host: Yaoundé, Cameroon; Level: Future Series; Prize: $3,000; Format: 32MS/16WS/16MD/4WD/8XD	(Jordan) Bahaedeen Ahmad Alshannik	(India) Sahil Sipani
July 9	Cameroon International: Host: Yaoundé, Cameroon; Level: Future Series; Prize: $3,000; Format: 32MS/16WS/16MD/4WD/8XD	Score: 19–21, 21–17, 21–17	
July 9	Cameroon International: Host: Yaoundé, Cameroon; Level: Future Series; Prize: $3,000; Format: 32MS/16WS/16MD/4WD/8XD	(Egypt) Hana Hesham Mohamed	(Cameroon) Madeleine Carene Leticia Akoumba Ze
July 9	Cameroon International: Host: Yaoundé, Cameroon; Level: Future Series; Prize: $3,000; Format: 32MS/16WS/16MD/4WD/8XD	Score: 21–18, 21–6	
July 9	Cameroon International: Host: Yaoundé, Cameroon; Level: Future Series; Prize: $3,000; Format: 32MS/16WS/16MD/4WD/8XD	(Jordan) Bahaedeen Ahmad Alshannik (Jordan) Mohd Naser Mansour Nayef	(Egypt) Adham Hatem Elgamal (Egypt) Mohamed Mostafa Kamel
July 9	Cameroon International: Host: Yaoundé, Cameroon; Level: Future Series; Prize: $3,000; Format: 32MS/16WS/16MD/4WD/8XD	Score: 21–12, 21–15	
July 9	Cameroon International: Host: Yaoundé, Cameroon; Level: Future Series; Prize: $3,000; Format: 32MS/16WS/16MD/4WD/8XD	(Cameroon) Laeticia Guefack Ghomsi (Cameroon) Louise Lisane Mbas	(Cameroon) Louise Reine Mbida Mbida (Cameroon) Stella Joel Ngadjui
July 9	Cameroon International: Host: Yaoundé, Cameroon; Level: Future Series; Prize: $3,000; Format: 32MS/16WS/16MD/4WD/8XD	Score: 21–9, 21–10	
July 9	Cameroon International: Host: Yaoundé, Cameroon; Level: Future Series; Prize: $3,000; Format: 32MS/16WS/16MD/4WD/8XD	(Cameroon) Antoine Eddy Owona Ndimako (Cameroon) Louise Lisane Mbas	(Cameroon) Pierre Frederic Bitep (Cameroon) Louise Reine Mbida Mbida
July 9	Cameroon International: Host: Yaoundé, Cameroon; Level: Future Series; Prize: $3,000; Format: 32MS/16WS/16MD/4WD/8XD	Score: 21–6, 21–19	
July 16	U.S. Open (Draw): Host: Anaheim, United States; Level: Grand Prix Gold; Prize: $120,000; Format: 64MS/32WS/32MD/32WD/32XD	(India) H.S. Prannoy	(India) Kashyap Parupalli
July 16	U.S. Open (Draw): Host: Anaheim, United States; Level: Grand Prix Gold; Prize: $120,000; Format: 64MS/32WS/32MD/32WD/32XD	Score: 21–15, 20–22, 21–12	
July 16	U.S. Open (Draw): Host: Anaheim, United States; Level: Grand Prix Gold; Prize: $120,000; Format: 64MS/32WS/32MD/32WD/32XD	(Japan) Aya Ohori	(Canada) Michelle Li
July 16	U.S. Open (Draw): Host: Anaheim, United States; Level: Grand Prix Gold; Prize: $120,000; Format: 64MS/32WS/32MD/32WD/32XD	Score: 21–11, 21–19	
July 16	U.S. Open (Draw): Host: Anaheim, United States; Level: Grand Prix Gold; Prize: $120,000; Format: 64MS/32WS/32MD/32WD/32XD	(Japan) Takuto Inoue (Japan) Yuki Kaneko	(Chinese Taipei) Lu Ching-yao (Chinese Taipei) Yang Po-han
July 16	U.S. Open (Draw): Host: Anaheim, United States; Level: Grand Prix Gold; Prize: $120,000; Format: 64MS/32WS/32MD/32WD/32XD	Score: 15–21, 21–13, 21–13	
July 16	U.S. Open (Draw): Host: Anaheim, United States; Level: Grand Prix Gold; Prize: $120,000; Format: 64MS/32WS/32MD/32WD/32XD	(South Korea) Lee So-hee (South Korea) Shin Seung-chan	(Japan) Mayu Matsumoto (Japan) Wakana Nagahara
July 16	U.S. Open (Draw): Host: Anaheim, United States; Level: Grand Prix Gold; Prize: $120,000; Format: 64MS/32WS/32MD/32WD/32XD	Score:21–16, 21–13	
July 16	U.S. Open (Draw): Host: Anaheim, United States; Level: Grand Prix Gold; Prize: $120,000; Format: 64MS/32WS/32MD/32WD/32XD	(South Korea) Seo Seung-jae (South Korea) Kim Ha-na	(South Korea) Kim Won-ho (South Korea) Shin Seung-chan
July 16	U.S. Open (Draw): Host: Anaheim, United States; Level: Grand Prix Gold; Prize: $120,000; Format: 64MS/32WS/32MD/32WD/32XD	Score: 16–21, 21–14, 21–11	
July 16	Russian Open (Draw): Host: Vladivostok, Russia; Level: Grand Prix; Prize: $65,000; Format: 64MS/32WS/32MD/32WD/32XD	(Russia) Sergey Sirant	(Russia) Vladimir Malkov
July 16	Russian Open (Draw): Host: Vladivostok, Russia; Level: Grand Prix; Prize: $65,000; Format: 64MS/32WS/32MD/32WD/32XD	Score: 13–11, 11–5, 6–11, 7–11, 11–4	
July 16	Russian Open (Draw): Host: Vladivostok, Russia; Level: Grand Prix; Prize: $65,000; Format: 64MS/32WS/32MD/32WD/32XD	(Russia) Evgeniya Kosetskaya	(Malaysia) Sonia Cheah Su Ya
July 16	Russian Open (Draw): Host: Vladivostok, Russia; Level: Grand Prix; Prize: $65,000; Format: 64MS/32WS/32MD/32WD/32XD	Score: 11–9, 5–11, 11–5, 5–11, 11–4	
July 16	Russian Open (Draw): Host: Vladivostok, Russia; Level: Grand Prix; Prize: $65,000; Format: 64MS/32WS/32MD/32WD/32XD	(Russia) Vladimir Ivanov (Russia) Ivan Sozonov	(Malaysia) Chooi Kah Ming (Malaysia) Low Juan Shen
July 16	Russian Open (Draw): Host: Vladivostok, Russia; Level: Grand Prix; Prize: $65,000; Format: 64MS/32WS/32MD/32WD/32XD	Score: 11–6, 11–9, 11–5	
July 16	Russian Open (Draw): Host: Vladivostok, Russia; Level: Grand Prix; Prize: $65,000; Format: 64MS/32WS/32MD/32WD/32XD	(Japan) Akane Araki (Japan) Aoi Matsuda	(Japan) Yuho Imai (Japan) Minami Kawashima
July 16	Russian Open (Draw): Host: Vladivostok, Russia; Level: Grand Prix; Prize: $65,000; Format: 64MS/32WS/32MD/32WD/32XD	Score: 11–6, 6–11, 11–7, 7–11, 11–5	
July 16	Russian Open (Draw): Host: Vladivostok, Russia; Level: Grand Prix; Prize: $65,000; Format: 64MS/32WS/32MD/32WD/32XD	(Malaysia) Chan Peng Soon (Malaysia) Cheah Yee See	(Japan) Keiichiro Matsui (Japan) Akane Araki
July 16	Russian Open (Draw): Host: Vladivostok, Russia; Level: Grand Prix; Prize: $65,000; Format: 64MS/32WS/32MD/32WD/32XD	Score: 11–8, 13–11, 11–3	
July 23	Lagos International: Host: Lagos, Nigeria; Level: International Challenge; Prize: $20,000; Format: 32MS/32WS/32MD/16WD/32XD	(India) Rahul Yadav Chittaboina	(India) Karan Rajan Rajarajan
July 23	Lagos International: Host: Lagos, Nigeria; Level: International Challenge; Prize: $20,000; Format: 32MS/32WS/32MD/16WD/32XD	Score: 21–15, 21–13	
July 23	Lagos International: Host: Lagos, Nigeria; Level: International Challenge; Prize: $20,000; Format: 32MS/32WS/32MD/16WD/32XD	(Sri Lanka) Thilini Pramodika Hendahewa	(India) Mugdha Agrey
July 23	Lagos International: Host: Lagos, Nigeria; Level: International Challenge; Prize: $20,000; Format: 32MS/32WS/32MD/16WD/32XD	Score: 21–13, 21–19	
July 23	Lagos International: Host: Lagos, Nigeria; Level: International Challenge; Prize: $20,000; Format: 32MS/32WS/32MD/16WD/32XD	(India) Manu Attri (India) B. Sumeeth Reddy	(Nigeria) Godwin Olofua (Nigeria) Anuoluwapo Juwon Opeyori
July 23	Lagos International: Host: Lagos, Nigeria; Level: International Challenge; Prize: $20,000; Format: 32MS/32WS/32MD/16WD/32XD	Score: 21–13, 21–15	
July 23	Lagos International: Host: Lagos, Nigeria; Level: International Challenge; Prize: $20,000; Format: 32MS/32WS/32MD/16WD/32XD	(Sri Lanka) Thilini Pramodika Hendahewa (Sri Lanka) Ishadika Kavidi	(Nigeria) Zainab Momoh (Nigeria) Ramatu Yakubu
July 23	Lagos International: Host: Lagos, Nigeria; Level: International Challenge; Prize: $20,000; Format: 32MS/32WS/32MD/16WD/32XD	Score: 21–8, 21–5	
July 23	Lagos International: Host: Lagos, Nigeria; Level: International Challenge; Prize: $20,000; Format: 32MS/32WS/32MD/16WD/32XD	(Israel) Misha Zilberman (Israel) Svetlana Zilberman	(Portugal) Duarte Nuno Anjo (Portugal) Sofia Setim
July 23	Lagos International: Host: Lagos, Nigeria; Level: International Challenge; Prize: $20,000; Format: 32MS/32WS/32MD/16WD/32XD	Score: 20–22, 21–16, 21–7	

=== August ===
Week of	Tournament	Champions	Runners-up
August 1	New Zealand Open (Draw): Host: Auckland, New Zealand; Level: Grand Prix Gold; Prize: $120,000; Format: 64MS/32WS/32MD/32WD/32XD	(Hong Kong) Lee Cheuk Yiu	(Chinese Taipei) Wang Tzu-wei
August 1	New Zealand Open (Draw): Host: Auckland, New Zealand; Level: Grand Prix Gold; Prize: $120,000; Format: 64MS/32WS/32MD/32WD/32XD	Score: 11–21, 21–15, 22–20	
August 1	New Zealand Open (Draw): Host: Auckland, New Zealand; Level: Grand Prix Gold; Prize: $120,000; Format: 64MS/32WS/32MD/32WD/32XD	(Thailand) Ratchanok Intanon	(Japan) Saena Kawakami
August 1	New Zealand Open (Draw): Host: Auckland, New Zealand; Level: Grand Prix Gold; Prize: $120,000; Format: 64MS/32WS/32MD/32WD/32XD	Score: 21–14, 16–21, 21–15	
August 1	New Zealand Open (Draw): Host: Auckland, New Zealand; Level: Grand Prix Gold; Prize: $120,000; Format: 64MS/32WS/32MD/32WD/32XD	(Chinese Taipei) Chen Hung-ling (Chinese Taipei) Wang Chi-lin	(Malaysia) Ong Yew Sin (Malaysia) Teo Ee Yi
August 1	New Zealand Open (Draw): Host: Auckland, New Zealand; Level: Grand Prix Gold; Prize: $120,000; Format: 64MS/32WS/32MD/32WD/32XD	Score: 21–16, 21–18	
August 1	New Zealand Open (Draw): Host: Auckland, New Zealand; Level: Grand Prix Gold; Prize: $120,000; Format: 64MS/32WS/32MD/32WD/32XD	(Malaysia) Vivian Hoo Kah Mun (Malaysia) Woon Khe Wei	(Japan) Ayako Sakuramoto (Japan) Yukiko Takahata
August 1	New Zealand Open (Draw): Host: Auckland, New Zealand; Level: Grand Prix Gold; Prize: $120,000; Format: 64MS/32WS/32MD/32WD/32XD	Score: 18–21, 21–16, 21–19	
August 1	New Zealand Open (Draw): Host: Auckland, New Zealand; Level: Grand Prix Gold; Prize: $120,000; Format: 64MS/32WS/32MD/32WD/32XD	(Indonesia) Ronald Alexander (Indonesia) Annisa Saufika	(Australia) Sawan Serasinghe (Australia) Setyana Mapasa
August 1	New Zealand Open (Draw): Host: Auckland, New Zealand; Level: Grand Prix Gold; Prize: $120,000; Format: 64MS/32WS/32MD/32WD/32XD	Score: 21–19, 21–14	
August 1	Yonex / K&D Graphics International: Host: Orange, United States; Level: International Series; Prize: $8,000; Format: 32MS/32WS/16MD/16WD/16XD	(Japan) Kento Momota	(Guatemala) Kevin Cordón
August 1	Yonex / K&D Graphics International: Host: Orange, United States; Level: International Series; Prize: $8,000; Format: 32MS/32WS/16MD/16WD/16XD	Score: 21–7, 21–15	
August 1	Yonex / K&D Graphics International: Host: Orange, United States; Level: International Series; Prize: $8,000; Format: 32MS/32WS/16MD/16WD/16XD	(United States) Jamie Hsu	(Peru) Daniela Macías
August 1	Yonex / K&D Graphics International: Host: Orange, United States; Level: International Series; Prize: $8,000; Format: 32MS/32WS/16MD/16WD/16XD	Score: 21–14, 21–12	
August 1	Yonex / K&D Graphics International: Host: Orange, United States; Level: International Series; Prize: $8,000; Format: 32MS/32WS/16MD/16WD/16XD	(United States) Vinson Chiu (United States) Tony Gunawan	(Germany) Daniel Benz (Germany) Andreas Heinz
August 1	Yonex / K&D Graphics International: Host: Orange, United States; Level: International Series; Prize: $8,000; Format: 32MS/32WS/16MD/16WD/16XD	Score: 16–21, 21–14, 21–14	
August 1	Yonex / K&D Graphics International: Host: Orange, United States; Level: International Series; Prize: $8,000; Format: 32MS/32WS/16MD/16WD/16XD	(United States) Kerry Xu (United States) Annie Xu	(Peru) Daniela Macías (Peru) Dánica Nishimura
August 1	Yonex / K&D Graphics International: Host: Orange, United States; Level: International Series; Prize: $8,000; Format: 32MS/32WS/16MD/16WD/16XD	Score: 21–11, 21–12	
August 1	Yonex / K&D Graphics International: Host: Orange, United States; Level: International Series; Prize: $8,000; Format: 32MS/32WS/16MD/16WD/16XD	(Canada) Toby Ng (Canada) Josephine Wu	(United States) Sattawat Pongnairat (United States) Kuei-Ya Chen
August 1	Yonex / K&D Graphics International: Host: Orange, United States; Level: International Series; Prize: $8,000; Format: 32MS/32WS/16MD/16WD/16XD	Score: 21–19, 21–15	
August 8	Waikato International: Host: Hamilton, New Zealand; Level: International Series; Prize: $8,000; Format: 64MS/32WS/32MD/16WD/32XD	(Netherlands) Erik Meijs	(Germany) Alexander Roovers
August 8	Waikato International: Host: Hamilton, New Zealand; Level: International Series; Prize: $8,000; Format: 64MS/32WS/32MD/16WD/32XD	Score: 21–12, 21–16	
August 8	Waikato International: Host: Hamilton, New Zealand; Level: International Series; Prize: $8,000; Format: 64MS/32WS/32MD/16WD/32XD	(Canada) Brittney Tam	(Chinese Taipei) Huang Yin-hsuan
August 8	Waikato International: Host: Hamilton, New Zealand; Level: International Series; Prize: $8,000; Format: 64MS/32WS/32MD/16WD/32XD	Score: 17–21, 25–23, 21–16	
August 8	Waikato International: Host: Hamilton, New Zealand; Level: International Series; Prize: $8,000; Format: 64MS/32WS/32MD/16WD/32XD	(Chinese Taipei) Su Li-wei (Chinese Taipei) Ye Hong-wei	(Malaysia) Chen Tang Jie (Malaysia) Soh Wooi Yik
August 8	Waikato International: Host: Hamilton, New Zealand; Level: International Series; Prize: $8,000; Format: 64MS/32WS/32MD/16WD/32XD	Score: 21–16, 17–21, 21–19	
August 8	Waikato International: Host: Hamilton, New Zealand; Level: International Series; Prize: $8,000; Format: 64MS/32WS/32MD/16WD/32XD	(Chinese Taipei) Li Zi-qing (Chinese Taipei) Teng Chun-hsun	(Chinese Taipei) Cheng Yu-pei (Chinese Taipei) Liang Chia-wei
August 8	Waikato International: Host: Hamilton, New Zealand; Level: International Series; Prize: $8,000; Format: 64MS/32WS/32MD/16WD/32XD	Score: 21–16, 21–19	
August 8	Waikato International: Host: Hamilton, New Zealand; Level: International Series; Prize: $8,000; Format: 64MS/32WS/32MD/16WD/32XD	(Indonesia) Riky Widianto (Indonesia) Richi Puspita Dili	(Chinese Taipei) Ye Hong-wei (Chinese Taipei) Teng Chun-hsun
August 8	Waikato International: Host: Hamilton, New Zealand; Level: International Series; Prize: $8,000; Format: 64MS/32WS/32MD/16WD/32XD	Score: 21–15, 26–24	
August 15	Bulgarian Open: Host: Sofia, Bulgaria; Level: International Series; Prize: $8,000; Format: 32MS/32WS/32MD/32WD/32XD	(India) Lakshya Sen	(Croatia) Zvonimir Đurkinjak
August 15	Bulgarian Open: Host: Sofia, Bulgaria; Level: International Series; Prize: $8,000; Format: 32MS/32WS/32MD/32WD/32XD	Score: 18–21, 21–12, 21–17	
August 15	Bulgarian Open: Host: Sofia, Bulgaria; Level: International Series; Prize: $8,000; Format: 32MS/32WS/32MD/32WD/32XD	(Turkey) Neslihan Yiğit	(Germany) Luise Heim
August 15	Bulgarian Open: Host: Sofia, Bulgaria; Level: International Series; Prize: $8,000; Format: 32MS/32WS/32MD/32WD/32XD	Score: 21–17, 14–21, 21–17	
August 15	Bulgarian Open: Host: Sofia, Bulgaria; Level: International Series; Prize: $8,000; Format: 32MS/32WS/32MD/32WD/32XD	(Denmark) Mathias Thyrri (Denmark) Søren Toft Hansen	(Denmark) Jeppe Bay (Denmark) Rasmus Kjær
August 15	Bulgarian Open: Host: Sofia, Bulgaria; Level: International Series; Prize: $8,000; Format: 32MS/32WS/32MD/32WD/32XD	Score: 21–16, 21–12	
August 15	Bulgarian Open: Host: Sofia, Bulgaria; Level: International Series; Prize: $8,000; Format: 32MS/32WS/32MD/32WD/32XD	(Bulgaria) Gabriela Stoeva (Bulgaria) Stefani Stoeva	(Turkey) Bengisu Erçetin (Turkey) Nazlıcan İnci
August 15	Bulgarian Open: Host: Sofia, Bulgaria; Level: International Series; Prize: $8,000; Format: 32MS/32WS/32MD/32WD/32XD	Score: 21–16, 21–12	
August 15	Bulgarian Open: Host: Sofia, Bulgaria; Level: International Series; Prize: $8,000; Format: 32MS/32WS/32MD/32WD/32XD	(Bulgaria) Alex Vlaar (Netherlands) Iris Tabeling	(Denmark) Mathias Thyrri (Denmark) Emilie Aalestrup
August 15	Bulgarian Open: Host: Sofia, Bulgaria; Level: International Series; Prize: $8,000; Format: 32MS/32WS/32MD/32WD/32XD	Score: 23–21, 21–15	
August 21	World Championships (Draw): Host: Glasgow, Scotland; Level: World Championships; Prize: N/A; Format: 64MS/64WS/64MD/64WD/64XD	(Denmark) Viktor Axelsen	(China) Lin Dan
August 21	World Championships (Draw): Host: Glasgow, Scotland; Level: World Championships; Prize: N/A; Format: 64MS/64WS/64MD/64WD/64XD	Score: 22–20, 21–16	
August 21	World Championships (Draw): Host: Glasgow, Scotland; Level: World Championships; Prize: N/A; Format: 64MS/64WS/64MD/64WD/64XD	(Japan) Nozomi Okuhara	(India) P. V. Sindhu
August 21	World Championships (Draw): Host: Glasgow, Scotland; Level: World Championships; Prize: N/A; Format: 64MS/64WS/64MD/64WD/64XD	Score: 21–19, 20–22, 22–20	
August 21	World Championships (Draw): Host: Glasgow, Scotland; Level: World Championships; Prize: N/A; Format: 64MS/64WS/64MD/64WD/64XD	(China) Liu Cheng (China) Zhang Nan	(Indonesia) Mohammad Ahsan (Indonesia) Rian Agung Saputro
August 21	World Championships (Draw): Host: Glasgow, Scotland; Level: World Championships; Prize: N/A; Format: 64MS/64WS/64MD/64WD/64XD	Score: 21–10, 21–17	
August 21	World Championships (Draw): Host: Glasgow, Scotland; Level: World Championships; Prize: N/A; Format: 64MS/64WS/64MD/64WD/64XD	(China) Chen Qingchen (China) Jia Yifan	(Japan) Yuki Fukushima (Japan) Sayaka Hirota
August 21	World Championships (Draw): Host: Glasgow, Scotland; Level: World Championships; Prize: N/A; Format: 64MS/64WS/64MD/64WD/64XD	Score: 21–18, 17–21, 21–15	
August 21	World Championships (Draw): Host: Glasgow, Scotland; Level: World Championships; Prize: N/A; Format: 64MS/64WS/64MD/64WD/64XD	(Indonesia) Tontowi Ahmad (Indonesia) Liliyana Natsir	(China) Zheng Siwei (China) Chen Qingchen
August 21	World Championships (Draw): Host: Glasgow, Scotland; Level: World Championships; Prize: N/A; Format: 64MS/64WS/64MD/64WD/64XD	Score: 15–21, 21–16, 21–15	
August 21	Carebaco International: Host: Tacarigua, Trinidad and Tobago; Level: International Series; Prize: $8,000; Format: 32MS/32WS/32MD/16WD/32XD	(Guatemala) Kevin Cordón	(India) Karan Rajan Rajarajan
August 21	Carebaco International: Host: Tacarigua, Trinidad and Tobago; Level: International Series; Prize: $8,000; Format: 32MS/32WS/32MD/16WD/32XD	Score: 21–19, 21–18	
August 21	Carebaco International: Host: Tacarigua, Trinidad and Tobago; Level: International Series; Prize: $8,000; Format: 32MS/32WS/32MD/16WD/32XD	(United States) Jamie Subandhi	(Peru) Daniela Macías
August 21	Carebaco International: Host: Tacarigua, Trinidad and Tobago; Level: International Series; Prize: $8,000; Format: 32MS/32WS/32MD/16WD/32XD	Score: 20–22, 25–23, 21–9	
August 21	Carebaco International: Host: Tacarigua, Trinidad and Tobago; Level: International Series; Prize: $8,000; Format: 32MS/32WS/32MD/16WD/32XD	(Jamaica) Gareth Henry (Jamaica) Samuel Ricketts	(United States) Phillip Chew (United States) Ryan Chew
August 21	Carebaco International: Host: Tacarigua, Trinidad and Tobago; Level: International Series; Prize: $8,000; Format: 32MS/32WS/32MD/16WD/32XD	Score: 12–21, 21–14, 21–12	
August 21	Carebaco International: Host: Tacarigua, Trinidad and Tobago; Level: International Series; Prize: $8,000; Format: 32MS/32WS/32MD/16WD/32XD	(Peru) Daniela Macías (Peru) Dánica Nishimura	(Dominican Republic) Nairoby Jiménez (Dominican Republic) Licelott Sánchez
August 21	Carebaco International: Host: Tacarigua, Trinidad and Tobago; Level: International Series; Prize: $8,000; Format: 32MS/32WS/32MD/16WD/32XD	Score: 21–19, 21–12	
August 21	Carebaco International: Host: Tacarigua, Trinidad and Tobago; Level: International Series; Prize: $8,000; Format: 32MS/32WS/32MD/16WD/32XD	(Peru) Daniel la Torre (Peru) Dánica Nishimura	(Peru) Bruno Barrueto (Peru) Inés Castillo
August 21	Carebaco International: Host: Tacarigua, Trinidad and Tobago; Level: International Series; Prize: $8,000; Format: 32MS/32WS/32MD/16WD/32XD	Score: 21–16, 21–9	
August 29	Hellas Open: Host: Livadeia, Greece; Level: International Series; Prize: $8,000; Format: 32MS/32WS/32MD/16WD/32XD	(Denmark) Kim Bruun	(Finland) Henri Aarnio
August 29	Hellas Open: Host: Livadeia, Greece; Level: International Series; Prize: $8,000; Format: 32MS/32WS/32MD/16WD/32XD	Score: 21–12, 21–15	
August 29	Hellas Open: Host: Livadeia, Greece; Level: International Series; Prize: $8,000; Format: 32MS/32WS/32MD/16WD/32XD	(Turkey) Neslihan Yiğit	(Bulgaria) Mariya Mitsova
August 29	Hellas Open: Host: Livadeia, Greece; Level: International Series; Prize: $8,000; Format: 32MS/32WS/32MD/16WD/32XD	Score: 21–14, 17–21, 21–15	
August 29	Hellas Open: Host: Livadeia, Greece; Level: International Series; Prize: $8,000; Format: 32MS/32WS/32MD/16WD/32XD	(Denmark) Kasper Antonsen (Denmark) Niclas Nøhr	(Finland) Henri Aarnio (Finland) Iikka Heino
August 29	Hellas Open: Host: Livadeia, Greece; Level: International Series; Prize: $8,000; Format: 32MS/32WS/32MD/16WD/32XD	Score: 21–17, 21–12	
August 29	Hellas Open: Host: Livadeia, Greece; Level: International Series; Prize: $8,000; Format: 32MS/32WS/32MD/16WD/32XD	(Turkey) Özge Bayrak (Turkey) Cemre Fere	(Turkey) Bengisu Erçetin (Turkey) Nazlıcan İnci
August 29	Hellas Open: Host: Livadeia, Greece; Level: International Series; Prize: $8,000; Format: 32MS/32WS/32MD/16WD/32XD	Score: 24–26, 24–22, 21–19	
August 29	Hellas Open: Host: Livadeia, Greece; Level: International Series; Prize: $8,000; Format: 32MS/32WS/32MD/16WD/32XD	(India) Rohan Kapoor (India) Kuhoo Garg	(India) Utkarsh Arora (India) Karishma Wadkar
August 29	Hellas Open: Host: Livadeia, Greece; Level: International Series; Prize: $8,000; Format: 32MS/32WS/32MD/16WD/32XD	Score: 21–19, 21–19	
August 29	Slovek Open: Host: Trenčín, Slovakia; Level: Future Series; Prize: TBC; Format: 32MS/32WS/32MD/32WD/32XD	(Slovenia) Andraž Krapež	(Scotland) Matthew Carder
August 29	Slovek Open: Host: Trenčín, Slovakia; Level: Future Series; Prize: TBC; Format: 32MS/32WS/32MD/32WD/32XD	Score: 15–21, 21–18, 24–22	
August 29	Slovek Open: Host: Trenčín, Slovakia; Level: Future Series; Prize: TBC; Format: 32MS/32WS/32MD/32WD/32XD	(Hungary) Laura Sárosi	(Ukraine) Maryna Ilyinskaya
August 29	Slovek Open: Host: Trenčín, Slovakia; Level: Future Series; Prize: TBC; Format: 32MS/32WS/32MD/32WD/32XD	Score: 21–12, 21–14	
August 29	Slovek Open: Host: Trenčín, Slovakia; Level: Future Series; Prize: TBC; Format: 32MS/32WS/32MD/32WD/32XD	(Ukraine) Ivan Druzchenko (Ukraine) Vladislav Druzchenko	(Slovenia) Miha Ivanič (Slovenia) Andraž Krapež
August 29	Slovek Open: Host: Trenčín, Slovakia; Level: Future Series; Prize: TBC; Format: 32MS/32WS/32MD/32WD/32XD	Score: 21–17, 17–21, 21–14	
August 29	Slovek Open: Host: Trenčín, Slovakia; Level: Future Series; Prize: TBC; Format: 32MS/32WS/32MD/32WD/32XD	(Czech Republic) Alžběta Bášová (Czech Republic) Michaela Fuchsová	(Poland) Wiktoria Dąbczyńska (Poland) Aleksandra Goszczyńska
August 29	Slovek Open: Host: Trenčín, Slovakia; Level: Future Series; Prize: TBC; Format: 32MS/32WS/32MD/32WD/32XD	Score: 21–12, 21–10	
August 29	Slovek Open: Host: Trenčín, Slovakia; Level: Future Series; Prize: TBC; Format: 32MS/32WS/32MD/32WD/32XD	(Poland) Paweł Śmiłowski (Poland) Magdalena Świerczyńska	(Norway) Fredrik Kristensen (Norway) Solvår Flåten Jørgensen
August 29	Slovek Open: Host: Trenčín, Slovakia; Level: Future Series; Prize: TBC; Format: 32MS/32WS/32MD/32WD/32XD	Score: 13–21, 21–13, 21–12	

=== September ===
Week of	Tournament	Champions	Runners-up
September 3	Vietnam Open (Draw): Host: Ho Chi Minh City, Vietnam; Level: Grand Prix; Prize: $65,000; Format: 64MS/32WS/32MD/32WD/32XD	(Thailand) Khosit Phetpradab	(Thailand) Suppanyu Avihingsanon
September 3	Vietnam Open (Draw): Host: Ho Chi Minh City, Vietnam; Level: Grand Prix; Prize: $65,000; Format: 64MS/32WS/32MD/32WD/32XD	Score: 21–15, 21–19	
September 3	Vietnam Open (Draw): Host: Ho Chi Minh City, Vietnam; Level: Grand Prix; Prize: $65,000; Format: 64MS/32WS/32MD/32WD/32XD	(Japan) Sayaka Takahashi	(Vietnam) Vũ Thị Trang
September 3	Vietnam Open (Draw): Host: Ho Chi Minh City, Vietnam; Level: Grand Prix; Prize: $65,000; Format: 64MS/32WS/32MD/32WD/32XD	Score: 21–9, 21–14	
September 3	Vietnam Open (Draw): Host: Ho Chi Minh City, Vietnam; Level: Grand Prix; Prize: $65,000; Format: 64MS/32WS/32MD/32WD/32XD	(Indonesia) Wahyu Nayaka (Indonesia) Ade Yusuf Santoso	(Chinese Taipei) Liao Min-chun (Chinese Taipei) Su Cheng-heng
September 3	Vietnam Open (Draw): Host: Ho Chi Minh City, Vietnam; Level: Grand Prix; Prize: $65,000; Format: 64MS/32WS/32MD/32WD/32XD	Score: 12–21, 21–16, 23–21	
September 3	Vietnam Open (Draw): Host: Ho Chi Minh City, Vietnam; Level: Grand Prix; Prize: $65,000; Format: 64MS/32WS/32MD/32WD/32XD	(Thailand) Chayanit Chaladchalam (Thailand) Phataimas Muenwong	(Indonesia) Della Destiara Haris (Indonesia) Rizki Amelia Pradipta
September 3	Vietnam Open (Draw): Host: Ho Chi Minh City, Vietnam; Level: Grand Prix; Prize: $65,000; Format: 64MS/32WS/32MD/32WD/32XD	Score: 21–16, 21–19	
September 3	Vietnam Open (Draw): Host: Ho Chi Minh City, Vietnam; Level: Grand Prix; Prize: $65,000; Format: 64MS/32WS/32MD/32WD/32XD	(Indonesia) Alfian Eko Prasetya (Indonesia) Melati Daeva Oktavianti	(Indonesia) Riky Widianto (Indonesia) Masita Mahmudin
September 3	Vietnam Open (Draw): Host: Ho Chi Minh City, Vietnam; Level: Grand Prix; Prize: $65,000; Format: 64MS/32WS/32MD/32WD/32XD	Score: 21–14, 21–14	
September 3	Kharkiv International: Host: Kharkiv, Ukraine; Level: International Challenge; Prize: $20,000; Format: 32MS/32WS/32MD/32WD/32XD	(England) Toby Penty	(Hong Kong) Lee Cheuk Yiu
September 3	Kharkiv International: Host: Kharkiv, Ukraine; Level: International Challenge; Prize: $20,000; Format: 32MS/32WS/32MD/32WD/32XD	Score: 21–17, 21–13	
September 3	Kharkiv International: Host: Kharkiv, Ukraine; Level: International Challenge; Prize: $20,000; Format: 32MS/32WS/32MD/32WD/32XD	(Ukraine) Natalya Voytsekh	(India) Sri Krishna Priya Kudaravalli
September 3	Kharkiv International: Host: Kharkiv, Ukraine; Level: International Challenge; Prize: $20,000; Format: 32MS/32WS/32MD/32WD/32XD	Score: 18–21, 21–16, 23–21	
September 3	Kharkiv International: Host: Kharkiv, Ukraine; Level: International Challenge; Prize: $20,000; Format: 32MS/32WS/32MD/32WD/32XD	(India) Nandagopal Kidambi (India) Rohan Kapoor	(India) Alwin Francis (India) Tarun Kona
September 3	Kharkiv International: Host: Kharkiv, Ukraine; Level: International Challenge; Prize: $20,000; Format: 32MS/32WS/32MD/32WD/32XD	Score: 18–21, 24–22, 21–18	
September 3	Kharkiv International: Host: Kharkiv, Ukraine; Level: International Challenge; Prize: $20,000; Format: 32MS/32WS/32MD/32WD/32XD	(Germany) Johanna Goliszewski (Germany) Lara Kaepplein	(Ukraine) Maria Ulitina (Ukraine) Natalya Voytsekh
September 3	Kharkiv International: Host: Kharkiv, Ukraine; Level: International Challenge; Prize: $20,000; Format: 32MS/32WS/32MD/32WD/32XD	Score: 21–15, 21–14	
September 3	Kharkiv International: Host: Kharkiv, Ukraine; Level: International Challenge; Prize: $20,000; Format: 32MS/32WS/32MD/32WD/32XD	(India) Nandagopal Kidambi (India) Mahima Aggarwal	(India) Saurabh Sharma (India) Anoushka Parikh
September 3	Kharkiv International: Host: Kharkiv, Ukraine; Level: International Challenge; Prize: $20,000; Format: 32MS/32WS/32MD/32WD/32XD	Score: 21–14, 21–15	
September 3	Sydney International: Host: Sydney, Australia; Level: International Series; Prize: $8,000; Format: 64MS/32WS/32MD/16WD/32XD	(Chinese Taipei) Lin Chun-yi	(Chinese Taipei) Chen Shiau-cheng
September 3	Sydney International: Host: Sydney, Australia; Level: International Series; Prize: $8,000; Format: 64MS/32WS/32MD/16WD/32XD	Score: 21–18, 21–17	
September 3	Sydney International: Host: Sydney, Australia; Level: International Series; Prize: $8,000; Format: 64MS/32WS/32MD/16WD/32XD	(Chinese Taipei) Hung En-tzu	(Chinese Taipei) Hsieh Yu-ying
September 3	Sydney International: Host: Sydney, Australia; Level: International Series; Prize: $8,000; Format: 64MS/32WS/32MD/16WD/32XD	Score: 18–21, 21–18, 22–20	
September 3	Sydney International: Host: Sydney, Australia; Level: International Series; Prize: $8,000; Format: 64MS/32WS/32MD/16WD/32XD	(Australia) Yohan Hadikusumo Wiratama (Australia) Albertus Susanto Njoto	(Chinese Taipei) Chuang Pu-sheng (Chinese Taipei) Lin Yu-chieh
September 3	Sydney International: Host: Sydney, Australia; Level: International Series; Prize: $8,000; Format: 64MS/32WS/32MD/16WD/32XD	Score: 21–14, 21–6	
September 3	Sydney International: Host: Sydney, Australia; Level: International Series; Prize: $8,000; Format: 64MS/32WS/32MD/16WD/32XD	(Chinese Taipei) Hung En-tzu (Chinese Taipei) Lin Jhih-yun	(Australia) Wendy Chen Hsuan-yu (Australia) Sylvina Kurniawan
September 3	Sydney International: Host: Sydney, Australia; Level: International Series; Prize: $8,000; Format: 64MS/32WS/32MD/16WD/32XD	Score: 21–19, 21–19	
September 3	Sydney International: Host: Sydney, Australia; Level: International Series; Prize: $8,000; Format: 64MS/32WS/32MD/16WD/32XD	(Chinese Taipei) Ye Hong-wei (Chinese Taipei) Teng Chun-hsun	(Australia) Sawan Serasinghe (Australia) Setyana Mapasa
September 3	Sydney International: Host: Sydney, Australia; Level: International Series; Prize: $8,000; Format: 64MS/32WS/32MD/16WD/32XD	Score: Walkover	
September 10	Korea Open (Draw): Host: Seoul, South Korea; Level: Superseries; Prize: $600,000; Format: 32MS/32WS/32MD/32WD/32XD	(Indonesia) Anthony Sinisuka Ginting	(Indonesia) Jonatan Christie
September 10	Korea Open (Draw): Host: Seoul, South Korea; Level: Superseries; Prize: $600,000; Format: 32MS/32WS/32MD/32WD/32XD	Score: 21–13, 19–21, 22–20	
September 10	Korea Open (Draw): Host: Seoul, South Korea; Level: Superseries; Prize: $600,000; Format: 32MS/32WS/32MD/32WD/32XD	(India) P. V. Sindhu	(Japan) Nozomi Okuhara
September 10	Korea Open (Draw): Host: Seoul, South Korea; Level: Superseries; Prize: $600,000; Format: 32MS/32WS/32MD/32WD/32XD	Score: 22–20, 11–21, 21–18	
September 10	Korea Open (Draw): Host: Seoul, South Korea; Level: Superseries; Prize: $600,000; Format: 32MS/32WS/32MD/32WD/32XD	(Denmark) Mathias Boe (Denmark) Carsten Mogensen	(Indonesia) Marcus Fernaldi Gideon (Indonesia) Kevin Sanjaya Sukamuljo
September 10	Korea Open (Draw): Host: Seoul, South Korea; Level: Superseries; Prize: $600,000; Format: 32MS/32WS/32MD/32WD/32XD	Score: 21–19, 19–21, 21–15	
September 10	Korea Open (Draw): Host: Seoul, South Korea; Level: Superseries; Prize: $600,000; Format: 32MS/32WS/32MD/32WD/32XD	(China) Huang Yaqiong (China) Yu Xiaohan	(South Korea) Chang Ye-na (South Korea) Lee So-hee
September 10	Korea Open (Draw): Host: Seoul, South Korea; Level: Superseries; Prize: $600,000; Format: 32MS/32WS/32MD/32WD/32XD	Score: 21–11, 21–15	
September 10	Korea Open (Draw): Host: Seoul, South Korea; Level: Superseries; Prize: $600,000; Format: 32MS/32WS/32MD/32WD/32XD	(Indonesia) Praveen Jordan (Indonesia) Debby Susanto	(China) Wang Yilyu (China) Huang Dongping
September 10	Korea Open (Draw): Host: Seoul, South Korea; Level: Superseries; Prize: $600,000; Format: 32MS/32WS/32MD/32WD/32XD	Score: 21–17, 21–18	
September 10	Belgian International: Host: Leuven, Belgium; Level: International Challenge; Prize: $20,000; Format: 32MS/32WS/32MD/32WD/32XD	(Japan) Kento Momota	(Hong Kong) Lee Cheuk Yiu
September 10	Belgian International: Host: Leuven, Belgium; Level: International Challenge; Prize: $20,000; Format: 32MS/32WS/32MD/32WD/32XD	Score: 21–14, 21–18	
September 10	Belgian International: Host: Leuven, Belgium; Level: International Challenge; Prize: $20,000; Format: 32MS/32WS/32MD/32WD/32XD	(Spain) Beatriz Corrales	(China) Qi Xuefei
September 10	Belgian International: Host: Leuven, Belgium; Level: International Challenge; Prize: $20,000; Format: 32MS/32WS/32MD/32WD/32XD	Score: Walkover	
September 10	Belgian International: Host: Leuven, Belgium; Level: International Challenge; Prize: $20,000; Format: 32MS/32WS/32MD/32WD/32XD	(Denmark) Frederik Colberg (Denmark) Rasmus Fladberg	(England) Peter Briggs (England) Tom Wolfenden
September 10	Belgian International: Host: Leuven, Belgium; Level: International Challenge; Prize: $20,000; Format: 32MS/32WS/32MD/32WD/32XD	Score: 16–21, 21–13, 21–6	
September 10	Belgian International: Host: Leuven, Belgium; Level: International Challenge; Prize: $20,000; Format: 32MS/32WS/32MD/32WD/32XD	(Netherlands) Selena Piek (Netherlands) Cheryl Seinen	(Netherlands) Debora Jille (Netherlands) Imke van der Aar
September 10	Belgian International: Host: Leuven, Belgium; Level: International Challenge; Prize: $20,000; Format: 32MS/32WS/32MD/32WD/32XD	Score: 21–14, 21–16	
September 10	Belgian International: Host: Leuven, Belgium; Level: International Challenge; Prize: $20,000; Format: 32MS/32WS/32MD/32WD/32XD	(Netherlands) Jacco Arends (Netherlands) Selena Piek	(Republic of Ireland) Scott Evans (Sweden) Amanda Högström
September 10	Belgian International: Host: Leuven, Belgium; Level: International Challenge; Prize: $20,000; Format: 32MS/32WS/32MD/32WD/32XD	Score: 21–17, 21–9	
September 17	Japan Open (Draw): Host: Tokyo, Japan; Level: Superseries; Prize: $325,000; Format: 32MS/32WS/32MD/32WD/32XD	(Denmark) Viktor Axelsen	(Malaysia) Lee Chong Wei
September 17	Japan Open (Draw): Host: Tokyo, Japan; Level: Superseries; Prize: $325,000; Format: 32MS/32WS/32MD/32WD/32XD	Score: 21–14, 19–21, 21–14	
September 17	Japan Open (Draw): Host: Tokyo, Japan; Level: Superseries; Prize: $325,000; Format: 32MS/32WS/32MD/32WD/32XD	(Spain) Carolina Marín	(China) He Bingjiao
September 17	Japan Open (Draw): Host: Tokyo, Japan; Level: Superseries; Prize: $325,000; Format: 32MS/32WS/32MD/32WD/32XD	Score: 23–21, 21–12	
September 17	Japan Open (Draw): Host: Tokyo, Japan; Level: Superseries; Prize: $325,000; Format: 32MS/32WS/32MD/32WD/32XD	(Indonesia) Marcus Fernaldi Gideon (Indonesia) Kevin Sanjaya Sukamuljo	(Japan) Takuto Inoue (Japan) Yuki Kaneko
September 17	Japan Open (Draw): Host: Tokyo, Japan; Level: Superseries; Prize: $325,000; Format: 32MS/32WS/32MD/32WD/32XD	Score: 21–12, 21–15	
September 17	Japan Open (Draw): Host: Tokyo, Japan; Level: Superseries; Prize: $325,000; Format: 32MS/32WS/32MD/32WD/32XD	(Japan) Misaki Matsutomo (Japan) Ayaka Takahashi	(South Korea) Kim Ha-na (South Korea) Kong Hee-yong
September 17	Japan Open (Draw): Host: Tokyo, Japan; Level: Superseries; Prize: $325,000; Format: 32MS/32WS/32MD/32WD/32XD	Score: 21–18, 21–16	
September 17	Japan Open (Draw): Host: Tokyo, Japan; Level: Superseries; Prize: $325,000; Format: 32MS/32WS/32MD/32WD/32XD	(China) Wang Yilyu (China) Huang Dongping	(Japan) Takuro Hoki (Japan) Sayaka Hirota
September 17	Japan Open (Draw): Host: Tokyo, Japan; Level: Superseries; Prize: $325,000; Format: 32MS/32WS/32MD/32WD/32XD	Score: 21–13, 21–8	
September 17	Singapore International: Host: Singapore; Level: International Series; Prize: $8,000; Format: 64MS/32WS/32MD/32WD/32XD	(Singapore) Loh Kean Yew	(Singapore) Ryan Ng
September 17	Singapore International: Host: Singapore; Level: International Series; Prize: $8,000; Format: 64MS/32WS/32MD/32WD/32XD	Score: 21–15, 21–15	
September 17	Singapore International: Host: Singapore; Level: International Series; Prize: $8,000; Format: 64MS/32WS/32MD/32WD/32XD	(Indonesia) Ruselli Hartawan	(Malaysia) Goh Jin Wei
September 17	Singapore International: Host: Singapore; Level: International Series; Prize: $8,000; Format: 64MS/32WS/32MD/32WD/32XD	Score: 21–13, 10–21, 21–19	
September 17	Singapore International: Host: Singapore; Level: International Series; Prize: $8,000; Format: 64MS/32WS/32MD/32WD/32XD	(Indonesia) Kenas Adi Haryanto (Indonesia) Moh Reza Pahlevi Isfahani	(Indonesia) Akbar Bintang Cahyono (Indonesia) Giovani Dicky Oktavan
September 17	Singapore International: Host: Singapore; Level: International Series; Prize: $8,000; Format: 64MS/32WS/32MD/32WD/32XD	Score: 21–18, 21–18	
September 17	Singapore International: Host: Singapore; Level: International Series; Prize: $8,000; Format: 64MS/32WS/32MD/32WD/32XD	(Indonesia) Nisak Puji Lestari (Indonesia) Rahmadhani Hastiyanti Putri	(Indonesia) Tania Oktaviani Kusumah (Indonesia) Vania Arianti Sukoco
September 17	Singapore International: Host: Singapore; Level: International Series; Prize: $8,000; Format: 64MS/32WS/32MD/32WD/32XD	Score: 21–19, 26–24	
September 17	Singapore International: Host: Singapore; Level: International Series; Prize: $8,000; Format: 64MS/32WS/32MD/32WD/32XD	(Indonesia) Andika Ramadiansyah (Indonesia) Mychelle Chrystine Bandaso	(Hong Kong) Chang Tak Ching (Hong Kong) Ng Wing Yung
September 17	Singapore International: Host: Singapore; Level: International Series; Prize: $8,000; Format: 64MS/32WS/32MD/32WD/32XD	Score: 21–16, 21–18	
September 17	Ethiopia International: Host: Addis Abbaba, Ethiopia; Level: International Series; Prize: $8,000; Format: 32MS/32WS/32MD/16WD/32XD	(Israel) Misha Zilberman	(India) Aditya Joshi
September 17	Ethiopia International: Host: Addis Abbaba, Ethiopia; Level: International Series; Prize: $8,000; Format: 32MS/32WS/32MD/16WD/32XD	Score: 21–7, 21–19	
September 17	Ethiopia International: Host: Addis Abbaba, Ethiopia; Level: International Series; Prize: $8,000; Format: 32MS/32WS/32MD/16WD/32XD	(Sri Lanka) Lekha Shehani	(Sri Lanka) Waduthantri Kavindika Binari De Silva
September 17	Ethiopia International: Host: Addis Abbaba, Ethiopia; Level: International Series; Prize: $8,000; Format: 32MS/32WS/32MD/16WD/32XD	Score: 21–14, 21–9	
September 17	Ethiopia International: Host: Addis Abbaba, Ethiopia; Level: International Series; Prize: $8,000; Format: 32MS/32WS/32MD/16WD/32XD	(India) Arjun M. R. (India) Ramchandran Shlok	(Jordan) Bahaedeen Ahmad Alshannik (Jordan) Mohd Naser Mansour Nayef
September 17	Ethiopia International: Host: Addis Abbaba, Ethiopia; Level: International Series; Prize: $8,000; Format: 32MS/32WS/32MD/16WD/32XD	Score: 21–7, 21–19	
September 17	Ethiopia International: Host: Addis Abbaba, Ethiopia; Level: International Series; Prize: $8,000; Format: 32MS/32WS/32MD/16WD/32XD	(Sri Lanka) Waduthantri Kavindika Binari De Silva (Sri Lanka) Lekha Shehani	(Algeria) Halla Bouksani (Algeria) Linda Mazri
September 17	Ethiopia International: Host: Addis Abbaba, Ethiopia; Level: International Series; Prize: $8,000; Format: 32MS/32WS/32MD/16WD/32XD	Score: 21–12, 19–21, 21–8	
September 17	Ethiopia International: Host: Addis Abbaba, Ethiopia; Level: International Series; Prize: $8,000; Format: 32MS/32WS/32MD/16WD/32XD	(Israel) Misha Zilberman (Israel) Svetlana Zilberman	(Algeria) Sifeddine Larbaoui (Algeria) Linda Mazri
September 17	Ethiopia International: Host: Addis Abbaba, Ethiopia; Level: International Series; Prize: $8,000; Format: 32MS/32WS/32MD/16WD/32XD	Score: Walkover	
September 17	Polish International: Host: Bieruń, Poland; Level: International Series; Prize: $8,000; Format: 32MS/32WS/32MD/32WD/32XD	(Malaysia) Lee Zii Jia	(Malaysia) Soong Joo Ven
September 17	Polish International: Host: Bieruń, Poland; Level: International Series; Prize: $8,000; Format: 32MS/32WS/32MD/32WD/32XD	Score: 21–17, 21–16	
September 17	Polish International: Host: Bieruń, Poland; Level: International Series; Prize: $8,000; Format: 32MS/32WS/32MD/32WD/32XD	(Switzerland) Ayla Huser	(Wales) Jordan Hart
September 17	Polish International: Host: Bieruń, Poland; Level: International Series; Prize: $8,000; Format: 32MS/32WS/32MD/32WD/32XD	Score: 21–19, 24–22	
September 17	Polish International: Host: Bieruń, Poland; Level: International Series; Prize: $8,000; Format: 32MS/32WS/32MD/32WD/32XD	(Republic of Ireland) Nhat Nguyen (Republic of Ireland) Paul Reynolds	(Germany) Daniel Benz (Germany) Andreas Heinz
September 17	Polish International: Host: Bieruń, Poland; Level: International Series; Prize: $8,000; Format: 32MS/32WS/32MD/32WD/32XD	Score: 21–19, 25–23	
September 17	Polish International: Host: Bieruń, Poland; Level: International Series; Prize: $8,000; Format: 32MS/32WS/32MD/32WD/32XD	(England) Jenny Moore (England) Victoria Williams	(India) K. Maneesha (India) Arathi Sara Sunil
September 17	Polish International: Host: Bieruń, Poland; Level: International Series; Prize: $8,000; Format: 32MS/32WS/32MD/32WD/32XD	Score: 21–19, 24–22	
September 17	Polish International: Host: Bieruń, Poland; Level: International Series; Prize: $8,000; Format: 32MS/32WS/32MD/32WD/32XD	(Denmark) Kristoffer Knudsen (Denmark) Isabella Nielsen	(England) Matthew Clare (England) Victoria Williams
September 17	Polish International: Host: Bieruń, Poland; Level: International Series; Prize: $8,000; Format: 32MS/32WS/32MD/32WD/32XD	Score: 21–13, 21–15	
September 17	Internacional Mexicano: Host: Aguascalientes, Mexico; Level: International Series; Prize: $8,000; Format: 32MS/32WS/16MD/8WD/16XD	(Guatemala) Kevin Cordón	(Guatemala) Aníbal Marroquín
September 17	Internacional Mexicano: Host: Aguascalientes, Mexico; Level: International Series; Prize: $8,000; Format: 32MS/32WS/16MD/8WD/16XD	Score: 21–12, 21–9	
September 17	Internacional Mexicano: Host: Aguascalientes, Mexico; Level: International Series; Prize: $8,000; Format: 32MS/32WS/16MD/8WD/16XD	(United States) Jennie Gai	(United States) Isabel Zhong
September 17	Internacional Mexicano: Host: Aguascalientes, Mexico; Level: International Series; Prize: $8,000; Format: 32MS/32WS/16MD/8WD/16XD	Score: 21–11, 18–21, 21–16	
September 17	Internacional Mexicano: Host: Aguascalientes, Mexico; Level: International Series; Prize: $8,000; Format: 32MS/32WS/16MD/8WD/16XD	(Canada) Jason Anthony Ho-Shue (Canada) Nyl Yakura	(Mexico) Job Castillo (Mexico) Lino Munoz
September 17	Internacional Mexicano: Host: Aguascalientes, Mexico; Level: International Series; Prize: $8,000; Format: 32MS/32WS/16MD/8WD/16XD	Score: 18–21, 21–11, 21–17	
September 17	Internacional Mexicano: Host: Aguascalientes, Mexico; Level: International Series; Prize: $8,000; Format: 32MS/32WS/16MD/8WD/16XD	(Peru) Daniela Macías (Peru) Dánica Nishimura	(United States) Ariel Lee (United States) Sydney Lee
September 17	Internacional Mexicano: Host: Aguascalientes, Mexico; Level: International Series; Prize: $8,000; Format: 32MS/32WS/16MD/8WD/16XD	Score: 21–6, 21–6	
September 17	Internacional Mexicano: Host: Aguascalientes, Mexico; Level: International Series; Prize: $8,000; Format: 32MS/32WS/16MD/8WD/16XD	(Peru) Daniel la Torre Regal (Peru) Dánica Nishimura	(Cuba) Leodannis Martínez (Cuba) Tahimara Oropeza
September 17	Internacional Mexicano: Host: Aguascalientes, Mexico; Level: International Series; Prize: $8,000; Format: 32MS/32WS/16MD/8WD/16XD	Score: 21–19, 21–19	
September 24	Czech Open: Host: Brno, Czech Republic; Level: International Challenge; Prize: $20,000; Format: 32MS/32WS/32MD/32WD/32XD	(Japan) Kento Momota	(France) Thomas Rouxel
September 24	Czech Open: Host: Brno, Czech Republic; Level: International Challenge; Prize: $20,000; Format: 32MS/32WS/32MD/32WD/32XD	Score: 21–8, 21–14	
September 24	Czech Open: Host: Brno, Czech Republic; Level: International Challenge; Prize: $20,000; Format: 32MS/32WS/32MD/32WD/32XD	(Turkey) Neslihan Yiğit	(Japan) Kaho Funahashi
September 24	Czech Open: Host: Brno, Czech Republic; Level: International Challenge; Prize: $20,000; Format: 32MS/32WS/32MD/32WD/32XD	Score: 21–16, 14–21, 21–17	
September 24	Czech Open: Host: Brno, Czech Republic; Level: International Challenge; Prize: $20,000; Format: 32MS/32WS/32MD/32WD/32XD	(Poland) Miłosz Bochat (Poland) Adam Cwalina	(England) Ben Lane (England) Sean Vendy
September 24	Czech Open: Host: Brno, Czech Republic; Level: International Challenge; Prize: $20,000; Format: 32MS/32WS/32MD/32WD/32XD	Score: 21–18, 23–21	
September 24	Czech Open: Host: Brno, Czech Republic; Level: International Challenge; Prize: $20,000; Format: 32MS/32WS/32MD/32WD/32XD	(Japan) Erina Honda (Japan) Nozomi Shimizu	(England) Lauren Smith (England) Sarah Walker
September 24	Czech Open: Host: Brno, Czech Republic; Level: International Challenge; Prize: $20,000; Format: 32MS/32WS/32MD/32WD/32XD	Score: 21–13, 14–21, 21–16	
September 24	Czech Open: Host: Brno, Czech Republic; Level: International Challenge; Prize: $20,000; Format: 32MS/32WS/32MD/32WD/32XD	(Denmark) Mathias Bay-Smidt (Denmark) Alexandra Bøje	(France) Bastian Kersaudy (France) Léa Palermo
September 24	Czech Open: Host: Brno, Czech Republic; Level: International Challenge; Prize: $20,000; Format: 32MS/32WS/32MD/32WD/32XD	Score: 12–21, 21–8, 21–18	
September 24	Guatemala International: Host: Guatemala City, Guatemala; Level: International Series; Prize: $8,000; Format: 32MS/32WS/32MD/16WD/32XD	(Guatemala) Kevin Cordón	(Cuba) Leodannis Martínez
September 24	Guatemala International: Host: Guatemala City, Guatemala; Level: International Series; Prize: $8,000; Format: 32MS/32WS/32MD/16WD/32XD	Score: 21–17, 21–18	
September 24	Guatemala International: Host: Guatemala City, Guatemala; Level: International Series; Prize: $8,000; Format: 32MS/32WS/32MD/16WD/32XD	(Peru) Daniela Macías	(Cuba) Tahimara Oropeza
September 24	Guatemala International: Host: Guatemala City, Guatemala; Level: International Series; Prize: $8,000; Format: 32MS/32WS/32MD/16WD/32XD	Score: 21–16, 22–20	
September 24	Guatemala International: Host: Guatemala City, Guatemala; Level: International Series; Prize: $8,000; Format: 32MS/32WS/32MD/16WD/32XD	(United States) Phillip Chew (United States) Ryan Chew	(Guatemala) Jonathan Solís (Guatemala) Rodolfo Ramírez
September 24	Guatemala International: Host: Guatemala City, Guatemala; Level: International Series; Prize: $8,000; Format: 32MS/32WS/32MD/16WD/32XD	Score: 21–10, 21–16	
September 24	Guatemala International: Host: Guatemala City, Guatemala; Level: International Series; Prize: $8,000; Format: 32MS/32WS/32MD/16WD/32XD	(Peru) Daniela Macías (Peru) Dánica Nishimura	(Dominican Republic) Noemi Almonte (Dominican Republic) Bermary Polanco
September 24	Guatemala International: Host: Guatemala City, Guatemala; Level: International Series; Prize: $8,000; Format: 32MS/32WS/32MD/16WD/32XD	Score: 21–12, 21–6	
September 24	Guatemala International: Host: Guatemala City, Guatemala; Level: International Series; Prize: $8,000; Format: 32MS/32WS/32MD/16WD/32XD	(Cuba) Leodannis Martínez (Cuba) Tahimara Oropeza	(Guatemala) Christopher Martínez (Guatemala) Diana Corleto
September 24	Guatemala International: Host: Guatemala City, Guatemala; Level: International Series; Prize: $8,000; Format: 32MS/32WS/32MD/16WD/32XD	Score: 17–21, 21–13, 21–11	

=== October ===
Week of	Tournament	Champions	Runners-up
October 1	Bulgarian International: Host: Sofia, Bulgaria; Level: Future Series; Prize: TBC; Format: 32MS/32WS/32MD/32WD/32XD	(India) R. M. V. Gurusaidutt	(Turkey) Muhammed Ali Kurt
October 1	Bulgarian International: Host: Sofia, Bulgaria; Level: Future Series; Prize: TBC; Format: 32MS/32WS/32MD/32WD/32XD	Score: 21–17, 21–16	
October 1	Bulgarian International: Host: Sofia, Bulgaria; Level: Future Series; Prize: TBC; Format: 32MS/32WS/32MD/32WD/32XD	(Bulgaria) Mariya Mitsova	(Croatia) Maja Pavlinić
October 1	Bulgarian International: Host: Sofia, Bulgaria; Level: Future Series; Prize: TBC; Format: 32MS/32WS/32MD/32WD/32XD	Score: 21–10, 21–3	
October 1	Bulgarian International: Host: Sofia, Bulgaria; Level: Future Series; Prize: TBC; Format: 32MS/32WS/32MD/32WD/32XD	(India) Arun George (India) Sanyam Shukla	(Slovenia) Miha Ivanič (Slovenia) Andraž Krapež
October 1	Bulgarian International: Host: Sofia, Bulgaria; Level: Future Series; Prize: TBC; Format: 32MS/32WS/32MD/32WD/32XD	Score: 21–18, 21–13	
October 1	Bulgarian International: Host: Sofia, Bulgaria; Level: Future Series; Prize: TBC; Format: 32MS/32WS/32MD/32WD/32XD	(Belgium) Lise Jaques (Belgium) Flore Vandenhoucke	(Germany) Theresea Isenberg (Germany) Brid Stepper
October 1	Bulgarian International: Host: Sofia, Bulgaria; Level: Future Series; Prize: TBC; Format: 32MS/32WS/32MD/32WD/32XD	Score: 21–10, 21–10	
October 1	Bulgarian International: Host: Sofia, Bulgaria; Level: Future Series; Prize: TBC; Format: 32MS/32WS/32MD/32WD/32XD	(Austria) Dominik Stipsits (Austria) Antonia Meinke	(India) Sanyam Shukla (India) Ahillya Harjani
October 1	Bulgarian International: Host: Sofia, Bulgaria; Level: Future Series; Prize: TBC; Format: 32MS/32WS/32MD/32WD/32XD	Score: 21–16, 21–5	
October 8	Dutch Open (Draw): Host: Almere, Netherlands; Level: BWF Grand Prix; Prize: $65,000; Format: 64MS/32WS/32MD/32WD/32XD	(Japan) Kento Momota	(Japan) Yu Igarashi
October 8	Dutch Open (Draw): Host: Almere, Netherlands; Level: BWF Grand Prix; Prize: $65,000; Format: 64MS/32WS/32MD/32WD/32XD	Score: 21–10, 21–12	
October 8	Dutch Open (Draw): Host: Almere, Netherlands; Level: BWF Grand Prix; Prize: $65,000; Format: 64MS/32WS/32MD/32WD/32XD	(United States) Beiwen Zhang	(Canada) Michelle Li
October 8	Dutch Open (Draw): Host: Almere, Netherlands; Level: BWF Grand Prix; Prize: $65,000; Format: 64MS/32WS/32MD/32WD/32XD	Score: 21–16, 21–14	
October 8	Dutch Open (Draw): Host: Almere, Netherlands; Level: BWF Grand Prix; Prize: $65,000; Format: 64MS/32WS/32MD/32WD/32XD	(Chinese Taipei) Liao Min-chun (Chinese Taipei) Su Cheng-heng	(Japan) Takuto Inoue (Japan) Yuki Kaneko
October 8	Dutch Open (Draw): Host: Almere, Netherlands; Level: BWF Grand Prix; Prize: $65,000; Format: 64MS/32WS/32MD/32WD/32XD	Score: 24–22, 21–18	
October 8	Dutch Open (Draw): Host: Almere, Netherlands; Level: BWF Grand Prix; Prize: $65,000; Format: 64MS/32WS/32MD/32WD/32XD	(Indonesia) Della Destiara Haris (Indonesia) Rizki Amelia Pradipta	(Indonesia) Anggia Shitta Awanda (Indonesia) Ni Ketut Mahadewi Istarani
October 8	Dutch Open (Draw): Host: Almere, Netherlands; Level: BWF Grand Prix; Prize: $65,000; Format: 64MS/32WS/32MD/32WD/32XD	Score: 21–17, 21–16	
October 8	Dutch Open (Draw): Host: Almere, Netherlands; Level: BWF Grand Prix; Prize: $65,000; Format: 64MS/32WS/32MD/32WD/32XD	(England) Marcus Ellis (England) Lauren Smith	(Netherlands) Jacco Arends (Netherlands) Selena Piek
October 8	Dutch Open (Draw): Host: Almere, Netherlands; Level: BWF Grand Prix; Prize: $65,000; Format: 64MS/32WS/32MD/32WD/32XD	Score: 21–17, 21–18	
October 8	World Junior Championships (Draw): Host: Yogyakarta, Indonesia; Level: World Junior Mixed Team Championships; Format: 44 junior national teams	China	Malaysia
October 8	World Junior Championships (Draw): Host: Yogyakarta, Indonesia; Level: World Junior Mixed Team Championships; Format: 44 junior national teams	Fan Qiuyue / Li Wenmei; Gao Zhengze; Fan Qiuyue / Wang Chang; Han Yue; Li Wenmei / Liu Xuanxuan	Man Wei Chong / Pearly Tan; Leong Jun Hao; Chang Yee Jun / Ng Eng Cheong; Goh Jin Wei; Tan Sueh Jeou / Toh Ee Wei
October 8	World Junior Championships (Draw): Host: Yogyakarta, Indonesia; Level: World Junior Mixed Team Championships; Format: 44 junior national teams	Score: 3–1	
October 15	Denmark Open (Draw): Host: Odense, Denmark; Level: Superseries Premier; Prize: $750,000; Format: 32MS/32WS/32MD/32WD/32XD	(India) Srikanth Kidambi	(South Korea) Lee Hyun-il
October 15	Denmark Open (Draw): Host: Odense, Denmark; Level: Superseries Premier; Prize: $750,000; Format: 32MS/32WS/32MD/32WD/32XD	Score: 21–10, 21–5	
October 15	Denmark Open (Draw): Host: Odense, Denmark; Level: Superseries Premier; Prize: $750,000; Format: 32MS/32WS/32MD/32WD/32XD	(Thailand) Ratchanok Intanon	(Japan) Akane Yamaguchi
October 15	Denmark Open (Draw): Host: Odense, Denmark; Level: Superseries Premier; Prize: $750,000; Format: 32MS/32WS/32MD/32WD/32XD	Score: 14–21, 21–15, 21–19	
October 15	Denmark Open (Draw): Host: Odense, Denmark; Level: Superseries Premier; Prize: $750,000; Format: 32MS/32WS/32MD/32WD/32XD	(China) Liu Cheng (China) Zhang Nan	(Indonesia) Marcus Fernaldi Gideon (Indonesia) Kevin Sanjaya Sukamuljo
October 15	Denmark Open (Draw): Host: Odense, Denmark; Level: Superseries Premier; Prize: $750,000; Format: 32MS/32WS/32MD/32WD/32XD	Score: 21–16, 22–24, 21–19	
October 15	Denmark Open (Draw): Host: Odense, Denmark; Level: Superseries Premier; Prize: $750,000; Format: 32MS/32WS/32MD/32WD/32XD	(South Korea) Lee So-hee (South Korea) Shin Seung-chan	(Japan) Shiho Tanaka (Japan) Koharu Yonemoto
October 15	Denmark Open (Draw): Host: Odense, Denmark; Level: Superseries Premier; Prize: $750,000; Format: 32MS/32WS/32MD/32WD/32XD	Score: 21–13, 21–16	
October 15	Denmark Open (Draw): Host: Odense, Denmark; Level: Superseries Premier; Prize: $750,000; Format: 32MS/32WS/32MD/32WD/32XD	(Hong Kong) Tang Chun Man (Hong Kong) Tse Ying Suet	(China) Zheng Siwei (China) Chen Qingchen
October 15	Denmark Open (Draw): Host: Odense, Denmark; Level: Superseries Premier; Prize: $750,000; Format: 32MS/32WS/32MD/32WD/32XD	Score: 24–22, 19–21, 23–21	
October 15	World Junior Championships (Draw): Host: Yogyakarta, Indonesia; Level: World Junior Championships; Prize: N/A; Format: 256MS/256WS/128MD/128WD/128XD	(Thailand) Kunlavut Vitidsarn	(Malaysia) Leong Jun Hao
October 15	World Junior Championships (Draw): Host: Yogyakarta, Indonesia; Level: World Junior Championships; Prize: N/A; Format: 256MS/256WS/128MD/128WD/128XD	Score: 17–21, 21–15, 21–9	
October 15	World Junior Championships (Draw): Host: Yogyakarta, Indonesia; Level: World Junior Championships; Prize: N/A; Format: 256MS/256WS/128MD/128WD/128XD	(Indonesia) Gregoria Mariska Tunjung	(China) Han Yue
October 15	World Junior Championships (Draw): Host: Yogyakarta, Indonesia; Level: World Junior Championships; Prize: N/A; Format: 256MS/256WS/128MD/128WD/128XD	Score: 21–13, 13–21, 24–22	
October 15	World Junior Championships (Draw): Host: Yogyakarta, Indonesia; Level: World Junior Championships; Prize: N/A; Format: 256MS/256WS/128MD/128WD/128XD	(Japan) Mahiro Kaneko (Japan) Yunosuke Kubota	(China) Di Zijian (China) Wang Chang
October 15	World Junior Championships (Draw): Host: Yogyakarta, Indonesia; Level: World Junior Championships; Prize: N/A; Format: 256MS/256WS/128MD/128WD/128XD	Score: 21–14, 15–21, 21–13	
October 15	World Junior Championships (Draw): Host: Yogyakarta, Indonesia; Level: World Junior Championships; Prize: N/A; Format: 256MS/256WS/128MD/128WD/128XD	(South Korea) Baek Ha-na (South Korea) Lee Yu-rim	(Indonesia) Jauza Fadhila Sugiarto (Indonesia) Ribka Sugiarto
October 15	World Junior Championships (Draw): Host: Yogyakarta, Indonesia; Level: World Junior Championships; Prize: N/A; Format: 256MS/256WS/128MD/128WD/128XD	Score: 18–21, 21–11, 21–3	
October 15	World Junior Championships (Draw): Host: Yogyakarta, Indonesia; Level: World Junior Championships; Prize: N/A; Format: 256MS/256WS/128MD/128WD/128XD	(Indonesia) Rinov Rivaldy (Indonesia) Pitha Haningtyas Mentari	(Indonesia) Rehan Naufal Kusharjanto (Indonesia) Siti Fadia Silva Ramadhanti
October 15	World Junior Championships (Draw): Host: Yogyakarta, Indonesia; Level: World Junior Championships; Prize: N/A; Format: 256MS/256WS/128MD/128WD/128XD	Score: 21–23, 21–15, 21–18	
October 15	Mercosul International: Host: Foz do Iguaçu, Brazil; Level: International Series; Prize: $8,000; Format: 32MS/16WS/32MD/8WD/16XD	(Mexico) Luis Ramón Garrido	(Portugal) Duarte Nuno Anjo
October 15	Mercosul International: Host: Foz do Iguaçu, Brazil; Level: International Series; Prize: $8,000; Format: 32MS/16WS/32MD/8WD/16XD	Score: 21–18, 21–16	
October 15	Mercosul International: Host: Foz do Iguaçu, Brazil; Level: International Series; Prize: $8,000; Format: 32MS/16WS/32MD/8WD/16XD	(Brazil) Fabiana Silva	(Brazil) Bianca de Oliveira Lima
October 15	Mercosul International: Host: Foz do Iguaçu, Brazil; Level: International Series; Prize: $8,000; Format: 32MS/16WS/32MD/8WD/16XD	Score: 21–10, 21–8	
October 15	Mercosul International: Host: Foz do Iguaçu, Brazil; Level: International Series; Prize: $8,000; Format: 32MS/16WS/32MD/8WD/16XD	(Guatemala) Jonathan Solís (Guatemala) Rodolfo Ramírez	(Guatemala) Kevin Cordón (Guatemala) Aníbal Marroquín
October 15	Mercosul International: Host: Foz do Iguaçu, Brazil; Level: International Series; Prize: $8,000; Format: 32MS/16WS/32MD/8WD/16XD	Score: 15–21, 21–13, 21–13	
October 15	Mercosul International: Host: Foz do Iguaçu, Brazil; Level: International Series; Prize: $8,000; Format: 32MS/16WS/32MD/8WD/16XD	(Brazil) Paula Pereira (Brazil) Fabiana Silva	(Guatemala) Diana Corleto (Guatemala) Mariana Paiz
October 15	Mercosul International: Host: Foz do Iguaçu, Brazil; Level: International Series; Prize: $8,000; Format: 32MS/16WS/32MD/8WD/16XD	Score: 21–14, 21–17	
October 15	Mercosul International: Host: Foz do Iguaçu, Brazil; Level: International Series; Prize: $8,000; Format: 32MS/16WS/32MD/8WD/16XD	(Brazil) Artur Silva Pomoceno (Brazil) Fabiana Silva	(Guatemala) Aníbal Marroquín (Guatemala) Mariana Paiz
October 15	Mercosul International: Host: Foz do Iguaçu, Brazil; Level: International Series; Prize: $8,000; Format: 32MS/16WS/32MD/8WD/16XD	Score: 19–21, 21–18, 23–21	
October 22	French Open (Draw): Host: Paris, France; Level: Superseries; Prize: $325,000; Format: 32MS/32WS/32MD/32WD/32XD	(India) Srikanth Kidambi	(Japan) Kenta Nishimoto
October 22	French Open (Draw): Host: Paris, France; Level: Superseries; Prize: $325,000; Format: 32MS/32WS/32MD/32WD/32XD	Score: 21–14, 21–13	
October 22	French Open (Draw): Host: Paris, France; Level: Superseries; Prize: $325,000; Format: 32MS/32WS/32MD/32WD/32XD	(Chinese Taipei) Tai Tzu-ying	(Japan) Akane Yamaguchi
October 22	French Open (Draw): Host: Paris, France; Level: Superseries; Prize: $325,000; Format: 32MS/32WS/32MD/32WD/32XD	Score: 21–4, 21–16	
October 22	French Open (Draw): Host: Paris, France; Level: Superseries; Prize: $325,000; Format: 32MS/32WS/32MD/32WD/32XD	(Chinese Taipei) Lee Jhe-huei (Chinese Taipei) Lee Yang	(Denmark) Mathias Boe (Denmark) Carsten Mogensen
October 22	French Open (Draw): Host: Paris, France; Level: Superseries; Prize: $325,000; Format: 32MS/32WS/32MD/32WD/32XD	Score: 21–19, 23–21	
October 22	French Open (Draw): Host: Paris, France; Level: Superseries; Prize: $325,000; Format: 32MS/32WS/32MD/32WD/32XD	(Indonesia) Greysia Polii (Indonesia) Apriyani Rahayu	(South Korea) Lee So-hee (South Korea) Shin Seung-chan
October 22	French Open (Draw): Host: Paris, France; Level: Superseries; Prize: $325,000; Format: 32MS/32WS/32MD/32WD/32XD	Score: 21–17, 21–15	
October 22	French Open (Draw): Host: Paris, France; Level: Superseries; Prize: $325,000; Format: 32MS/32WS/32MD/32WD/32XD	(Indonesia) Tontowi Ahmad (Indonesia) Liliyana Natsir	(China) Zheng Siwei (China) Chen Qingchen
October 22	French Open (Draw): Host: Paris, France; Level: Superseries; Prize: $325,000; Format: 32MS/32WS/32MD/32WD/32XD	Score: 22–20, 21–15	
October 22	Indonesia International: Host: Semarang, Indonesia; Level: International Challenge; Prize: $20,000; Format: 64MS/32WS/32MD/32WD/32XD	(Indonesia) Shesar Hiren Rhustavito	(Thailand) Sitthikom Thammasin
October 22	Indonesia International: Host: Semarang, Indonesia; Level: International Challenge; Prize: $20,000; Format: 64MS/32WS/32MD/32WD/32XD	Score: 21–8, 21–11	
October 22	Indonesia International: Host: Semarang, Indonesia; Level: International Challenge; Prize: $20,000; Format: 64MS/32WS/32MD/32WD/32XD	(Japan) Shiori Saito	(Indonesia) Asty Dwi Widyaningrum
October 22	Indonesia International: Host: Semarang, Indonesia; Level: International Challenge; Prize: $20,000; Format: 64MS/32WS/32MD/32WD/32XD	Score: 21–15, 21–15	
October 22	Indonesia International: Host: Semarang, Indonesia; Level: International Challenge; Prize: $20,000; Format: 64MS/32WS/32MD/32WD/32XD	(Indonesia) Sabar Karyaman Gutama (Indonesia) Frengky Wijaya Putra	(Indonesia) Kenas Adi Haryanto (Indonesia) Muhammad Reza Pahlevi Isfahani
October 22	Indonesia International: Host: Semarang, Indonesia; Level: International Challenge; Prize: $20,000; Format: 64MS/32WS/32MD/32WD/32XD	Score: 21–18, 21–18	
October 22	Indonesia International: Host: Semarang, Indonesia; Level: International Challenge; Prize: $20,000; Format: 64MS/32WS/32MD/32WD/32XD	(Indonesia) Febriana Dwipuji Kusuma (Indonesia) Tiara Rosalia Nuraidah	(Indonesia) Agatha Imanuela (Indonesia) Siti Fadia Silva Ramadhanti
October 22	Indonesia International: Host: Semarang, Indonesia; Level: International Challenge; Prize: $20,000; Format: 64MS/32WS/32MD/32WD/32XD	Score: 21–19, 21–18	
October 22	Indonesia International: Host: Semarang, Indonesia; Level: International Challenge; Prize: $20,000; Format: 64MS/32WS/32MD/32WD/32XD	(Indonesia) Rehan Naufal Kusharjanto (Indonesia) Siti Fadia Silva Ramadhanti	(Indonesia) Irfan Fadhilah (Indonesia) Pia Zebadiah Bernadet
October 22	Indonesia International: Host: Semarang, Indonesia; Level: International Challenge; Prize: $20,000; Format: 64MS/32WS/32MD/32WD/32XD	Score: 21–9, 21–18	
October 22	Santo Domingo Open: Host: Santo Domingo, Dominican Republic; Level: International Series; Prize: $8,000; Format: 32MS/32WS/32MD/16WD/32XD	(Cuba) Osleni Guerrero	(Mexico) Luis Ramón Garrido
October 22	Santo Domingo Open: Host: Santo Domingo, Dominican Republic; Level: International Series; Prize: $8,000; Format: 32MS/32WS/32MD/16WD/32XD	Score: 12–21, 21–16, 21–12	
October 22	Santo Domingo Open: Host: Santo Domingo, Dominican Republic; Level: International Series; Prize: $8,000; Format: 32MS/32WS/32MD/16WD/32XD	(United States) Jamie Hsu	(Peru) Fernanda Saponara Rivva
October 22	Santo Domingo Open: Host: Santo Domingo, Dominican Republic; Level: International Series; Prize: $8,000; Format: 32MS/32WS/32MD/16WD/32XD	Score: 21–9, 21–10	
October 22	Santo Domingo Open: Host: Santo Domingo, Dominican Republic; Level: International Series; Prize: $8,000; Format: 32MS/32WS/32MD/16WD/32XD	(Cuba) Osleni Guerrero (Cuba) Leodannis Martínez	(Dominican Republic) Therry Aquino (Dominican Republic) Reimi Starling Cabrera Rosario
October 22	Santo Domingo Open: Host: Santo Domingo, Dominican Republic; Level: International Series; Prize: $8,000; Format: 32MS/32WS/32MD/16WD/32XD	Score: 21–12, 21–14	
October 22	Santo Domingo Open: Host: Santo Domingo, Dominican Republic; Level: International Series; Prize: $8,000; Format: 32MS/32WS/32MD/16WD/32XD	(Dominican Republic) Nairoby Abigail Jiménez (Dominican Republic) Licelott Sánchez	(Dominican Republic) Noemi Almonte (Dominican Republic) Bermary Polanco
October 22	Santo Domingo Open: Host: Santo Domingo, Dominican Republic; Level: International Series; Prize: $8,000; Format: 32MS/32WS/32MD/16WD/32XD	Score: 26–24, 21–16	
October 22	Santo Domingo Open: Host: Santo Domingo, Dominican Republic; Level: International Series; Prize: $8,000; Format: 32MS/32WS/32MD/16WD/32XD	(Cuba) Leodannis Martínez (Cuba) Tahimara Oropeza	(Cuba) Osleni Guerrero (Cuba) Adriana Artiz
October 22	Santo Domingo Open: Host: Santo Domingo, Dominican Republic; Level: International Series; Prize: $8,000; Format: 32MS/32WS/32MD/16WD/32XD	Score: 21–11, 13–21, 21–15	
October 22	Egypt International: Host: Cairo, Egypt; Level: International Series; Prize: $8,000; Format: 32MS/32WS/32MD/16WD/32XD	(England) Sam Parsons	(Russia) Anatoliy Yartsev
October 22	Egypt International: Host: Cairo, Egypt; Level: International Series; Prize: $8,000; Format: 32MS/32WS/32MD/16WD/32XD	Score: 21–23, 21–7, 21–14	
October 22	Egypt International: Host: Cairo, Egypt; Level: International Series; Prize: $8,000; Format: 32MS/32WS/32MD/16WD/32XD	(Turkey) Aliye Demirbağ	(Turkey) Cemre Fere
October 22	Egypt International: Host: Cairo, Egypt; Level: International Series; Prize: $8,000; Format: 32MS/32WS/32MD/16WD/32XD	Score: 21–15, 21–13	
October 22	Egypt International: Host: Cairo, Egypt; Level: International Series; Prize: $8,000; Format: 32MS/32WS/32MD/16WD/32XD	(Malaysia) Yogendran Khrishnan (Germany) Jonathan Persson	(Jordan) Bahaedeen Ahmad Alshannik (Jordan) Mohd Naser Mansour Nayef
October 22	Egypt International: Host: Cairo, Egypt; Level: International Series; Prize: $8,000; Format: 32MS/32WS/32MD/16WD/32XD	Score: 21–15, 21–18	
October 22	Egypt International: Host: Cairo, Egypt; Level: International Series; Prize: $8,000; Format: 32MS/32WS/32MD/16WD/32XD	(Belarus) Anastasiya Cherniavskaya (Belarus) Alesia Zaitsava	(India) Sanyogita Ghorpade (India) Prajakta Sawant
October 22	Egypt International: Host: Cairo, Egypt; Level: International Series; Prize: $8,000; Format: 32MS/32WS/32MD/16WD/32XD	Score: 21–17, 21–18	
October 22	Egypt International: Host: Cairo, Egypt; Level: International Series; Prize: $8,000; Format: 32MS/32WS/32MD/16WD/32XD	(Malaysia) Yogendran Khrishnan (India) Prajakta Sawant	(Egypt) Ahmed Salah (Egypt) Menna El-Tanany
October 22	Egypt International: Host: Cairo, Egypt; Level: International Series; Prize: $8,000; Format: 32MS/32WS/32MD/16WD/32XD	Score: 21–15, 21–13	
October 22	Hatzor International: Host: Hatzor, Israel; Level: Future Series; Prize: TBC; Format: 32MS/32WS/16MD/4WD/16XD	(Slovenia) Miha Ivanič	(Poland) Krzysztof Jakowczuk
October 22	Hatzor International: Host: Hatzor, Israel; Level: Future Series; Prize: TBC; Format: 32MS/32WS/16MD/4WD/16XD	Score: 11–21, 21–8, 21–10	
October 22	Hatzor International: Host: Hatzor, Israel; Level: Future Series; Prize: TBC; Format: 32MS/32WS/16MD/4WD/16XD	(Russia) Anastasiia Semenova	(Lithuania) Akvilė Stapušaitytė
October 22	Hatzor International: Host: Hatzor, Israel; Level: Future Series; Prize: TBC; Format: 32MS/32WS/16MD/4WD/16XD	Score: 21–12, 21–8	
October 22	Hatzor International: Host: Hatzor, Israel; Level: Future Series; Prize: TBC; Format: 32MS/32WS/16MD/4WD/16XD	(Israel) Alexander Bass (Israel) Shai Geffen	(Russia) Dmitry Dubovenko (Russia) Andrei Klimenkov
October 22	Hatzor International: Host: Hatzor, Israel; Level: Future Series; Prize: TBC; Format: 32MS/32WS/16MD/4WD/16XD	Score: 21–17, 21–16	
October 22	Hatzor International: Host: Hatzor, Israel; Level: Future Series; Prize: TBC; Format: 32MS/32WS/16MD/4WD/16XD	(Russia) Ksenia Evgenova (Russia) Anastasiia Semenova	(Cyprus) Eleni Christodoulou (Cyprus) Anastasia Zintsidou
October 22	Hatzor International: Host: Hatzor, Israel; Level: Future Series; Prize: TBC; Format: 32MS/32WS/16MD/4WD/16XD	Score: 21–16, 15–21, 21–11	
October 22	Hatzor International: Host: Hatzor, Israel; Level: Future Series; Prize: TBC; Format: 32MS/32WS/16MD/4WD/16XD	(Israel) Yonathan Levit (Russia) Yulia Vasilyeva	(Poland) Maciej Ociepa (Poland) Agnieszka Foryta
October 22	Hatzor International: Host: Hatzor, Israel; Level: Future Series; Prize: TBC; Format: 32MS/32WS/16MD/4WD/16XD	Score: 19–21, 15–21, 30–28	
October 29	Bitburger Open (Draw): Host: Saarbrücken, Germany; Level: Grand Prix Gold; Prize: $120,000; Format: 64MS/32WS/32MD/32WD/32XD	(Denmark) Rasmus Gemke	(Chinese Taipei) Hsu Jen-hao
October 29	Bitburger Open (Draw): Host: Saarbrücken, Germany; Level: Grand Prix Gold; Prize: $120,000; Format: 64MS/32WS/32MD/32WD/32XD	Score: 21–18, 21–10	
October 29	Bitburger Open (Draw): Host: Saarbrücken, Germany; Level: Grand Prix Gold; Prize: $120,000; Format: 64MS/32WS/32MD/32WD/32XD	(Thailand) Nitchaon Jindapol	(United States) Beiwen Zhang
October 29	Bitburger Open (Draw): Host: Saarbrücken, Germany; Level: Grand Prix Gold; Prize: $120,000; Format: 64MS/32WS/32MD/32WD/32XD	Score: 21–17, 15–21, 21–19	
October 29	Bitburger Open (Draw): Host: Saarbrücken, Germany; Level: Grand Prix Gold; Prize: $120,000; Format: 64MS/32WS/32MD/32WD/32XD	(Denmark) Kim Astrup (Denmark) Anders Skaarup Rasmussen	(Indonesia) Fajar Alfian (Indonesia) Muhammad Rian Ardianto
October 29	Bitburger Open (Draw): Host: Saarbrücken, Germany; Level: Grand Prix Gold; Prize: $120,000; Format: 64MS/32WS/32MD/32WD/32XD	Score: 21–19, 19–21, 21–18	
October 29	Bitburger Open (Draw): Host: Saarbrücken, Germany; Level: Grand Prix Gold; Prize: $120,000; Format: 64MS/32WS/32MD/32WD/32XD	(Thailand) Jongkolphan Kititharakul (Thailand) Rawinda Prajongjai	(Japan) Akane Araki (Japan) Aoi Matsuda
October 29	Bitburger Open (Draw): Host: Saarbrücken, Germany; Level: Grand Prix Gold; Prize: $120,000; Format: 64MS/32WS/32MD/32WD/32XD	Score: 21–19, 21–6	
October 29	Bitburger Open (Draw): Host: Saarbrücken, Germany; Level: Grand Prix Gold; Prize: $120,000; Format: 64MS/32WS/32MD/32WD/32XD	(China) He Jiting (China) Du Yue	(Denmark) Anders Skaarup Rasmussen (Denmark) Line Kjaersfeldt
October 29	Bitburger Open (Draw): Host: Saarbrücken, Germany; Level: Grand Prix Gold; Prize: $120,000; Format: 64MS/32WS/32MD/32WD/32XD	Score: 21–18, 21–17	
October 29	Hungarian International: Host: Budapest, Hungary; Level: International Challenge; Prize: $20,000; Format: 32MS/32WS/32MD/32WD/32XD	(Denmark) Victor Svendsen	(Spain) Pablo Abián
October 29	Hungarian International: Host: Budapest, Hungary; Level: International Challenge; Prize: $20,000; Format: 32MS/32WS/32MD/32WD/32XD	Score: 21–13, 15–21, 21–12	
October 29	Hungarian International: Host: Budapest, Hungary; Level: International Challenge; Prize: $20,000; Format: 32MS/32WS/32MD/32WD/32XD	(Turkey) Neslihan Yiğit	(Turkey) Aliye Demirbağ
October 29	Hungarian International: Host: Budapest, Hungary; Level: International Challenge; Prize: $20,000; Format: 32MS/32WS/32MD/32WD/32XD	Score: 21–11, 17–21, 21–18	
October 29	Hungarian International: Host: Budapest, Hungary; Level: International Challenge; Prize: $20,000; Format: 32MS/32WS/32MD/32WD/32XD	(Denmark) Frederik Colberg (Denmark) Rasmus Fladberg	(Denmark) Joel Eipe (Denmark) Philip Seerup
October 29	Hungarian International: Host: Budapest, Hungary; Level: International Challenge; Prize: $20,000; Format: 32MS/32WS/32MD/32WD/32XD	Score: 21–18, 21–14	
October 29	Hungarian International: Host: Budapest, Hungary; Level: International Challenge; Prize: $20,000; Format: 32MS/32WS/32MD/32WD/32XD	(Russia) Ekaterina Bolotova (Russia) Alina Davletova	(Russia) Elena Komendrovskaja (Russia) Maria Shegurova
October 29	Hungarian International: Host: Budapest, Hungary; Level: International Challenge; Prize: $20,000; Format: 32MS/32WS/32MD/32WD/32XD	Score: 21–13, 21–19	
October 29	Hungarian International: Host: Budapest, Hungary; Level: International Challenge; Prize: $20,000; Format: 32MS/32WS/32MD/32WD/32XD	(Russia) Rodion Alimov (Russia) Alina Davletova	(Denmark) Soren Gravholt (Sweden) Louise Eriksson
October 29	Hungarian International: Host: Budapest, Hungary; Level: International Challenge; Prize: $20,000; Format: 32MS/32WS/32MD/32WD/32XD	Score: 25–23, 21–16	
October 29	Lao International: Host: Vientiane, Laos; Level: International Series; Prize: $8,000; Format: 64MS/32WS/32MD/32WD/32XD	(Thailand) Kantawat Leelavechabutr	(Thailand) Mek Narongrit
October 29	Lao International: Host: Vientiane, Laos; Level: International Series; Prize: $8,000; Format: 64MS/32WS/32MD/32WD/32XD	Score: 16–21, 21–12, 21–12	
October 29	Lao International: Host: Vientiane, Laos; Level: International Series; Prize: $8,000; Format: 64MS/32WS/32MD/32WD/32XD	(Vietnam) Nguyễn Thùy Linh	(Thailand) Benyapa Aimsaard
October 29	Lao International: Host: Vientiane, Laos; Level: International Series; Prize: $8,000; Format: 64MS/32WS/32MD/32WD/32XD	Score: 21–12, 16–21, 21–11	
October 29	Lao International: Host: Vientiane, Laos; Level: International Series; Prize: $8,000; Format: 64MS/32WS/32MD/32WD/32XD	(Malaysia) Muhammad Syawal Mohd Ismail (Indonesia) Lukhi Apri Nugroho	(Malaysia) Lee Jian Yi (Malaysia) Lim Zhen Ting
October 29	Lao International: Host: Vientiane, Laos; Level: International Series; Prize: $8,000; Format: 64MS/32WS/32MD/32WD/32XD	Score: 17–21, 21–10, 21–14	
October 29	Lao International: Host: Vientiane, Laos; Level: International Series; Prize: $8,000; Format: 64MS/32WS/32MD/32WD/32XD	(Thailand) Kittipak Dubthuk (Thailand) Natcha Saengchote	(Indonesia) Ririn Amelia (Malaysia) Anna Cheong
October 29	Lao International: Host: Vientiane, Laos; Level: International Series; Prize: $8,000; Format: 64MS/32WS/32MD/32WD/32XD	Score: 21–11, 21–17	
October 29	Lao International: Host: Vientiane, Laos; Level: International Series; Prize: $8,000; Format: 64MS/32WS/32MD/32WD/32XD	(Indonesia) Lukhi Apri Nugroho (Indonesia) Ririn Amelia	(Thailand) Parinyawat Thongnuam (Thailand) Kittipak Dubthuk
October 29	Lao International: Host: Vientiane, Laos; Level: International Series; Prize: $8,000; Format: 64MS/32WS/32MD/32WD/32XD	Score: 21–17, 13–21, 21–13	

=== November ===
Week of	Tournament	Champions	Runners-up
November 5	Macau Open (Draw): Host: Macau; Level: Grand Prix Gold; Prize: $120,000; Format: 64MS/32WS/32MD/32WD/32XD	(Japan) Kento Momota	(Indonesia) Ihsan Maulana Mustofa
November 5	Macau Open (Draw): Host: Macau; Level: Grand Prix Gold; Prize: $120,000; Format: 64MS/32WS/32MD/32WD/32XD	Score: 21–16, 21–10	
November 5	Macau Open (Draw): Host: Macau; Level: Grand Prix Gold; Prize: $120,000; Format: 64MS/32WS/32MD/32WD/32XD	(China) Cai Yanyan	(Chinese Taipei) Pai Yu-po
November 5	Macau Open (Draw): Host: Macau; Level: Grand Prix Gold; Prize: $120,000; Format: 64MS/32WS/32MD/32WD/32XD	Score: 21–15, 17–21, 21–16	
November 5	Macau Open (Draw): Host: Macau; Level: Grand Prix Gold; Prize: $120,000; Format: 64MS/32WS/32MD/32WD/32XD	(Indonesia) Wahyu Nayaka (Indonesia) Ade Yusuf Santoso	(South Korea) Kim Won-ho (South Korea) Seo Seung-jae
November 5	Macau Open (Draw): Host: Macau; Level: Grand Prix Gold; Prize: $120,000; Format: 64MS/32WS/32MD/32WD/32XD	Score: 21–13, 21–14	
November 5	Macau Open (Draw): Host: Macau; Level: Grand Prix Gold; Prize: $120,000; Format: 64MS/32WS/32MD/32WD/32XD	(China) Huang Yaqiong (China) Yu Xiaohan	(South Korea) Baek Ha-na (South Korea) Lee Yu-rim
November 5	Macau Open (Draw): Host: Macau; Level: Grand Prix Gold; Prize: $120,000; Format: 64MS/32WS/32MD/32WD/32XD	Score: 21–10, 21–17	
November 5	Macau Open (Draw): Host: Macau; Level: Grand Prix Gold; Prize: $120,000; Format: 64MS/32WS/32MD/32WD/32XD	(China) Zheng Siwei (China) Huang Yaqiong	(South Korea) Seo Seung-jae (South Korea) Kim Ha-na
November 5	Macau Open (Draw): Host: Macau; Level: Grand Prix Gold; Prize: $120,000; Format: 64MS/32WS/32MD/32WD/32XD	Score: 21–14, 21–11	
November 5	Morocco International: Host: Casablanca, Morocco; Level: International Series; Prize: $8,000; Format: 32MS/32WS/16MD/8WD/16XD	(France) Lucas Claerbout	(Denmark) Soren Toft Hansen
November 5	Morocco International: Host: Casablanca, Morocco; Level: International Series; Prize: $8,000; Format: 32MS/32WS/16MD/8WD/16XD	Score: 21–14, 21–13	
November 5	Morocco International: Host: Casablanca, Morocco; Level: International Series; Prize: $8,000; Format: 32MS/32WS/16MD/8WD/16XD	(Slovakia) Martina Repiska	(France) Manon Krieger
November 5	Morocco International: Host: Casablanca, Morocco; Level: International Series; Prize: $8,000; Format: 32MS/32WS/16MD/8WD/16XD	Score: 21–19, 21–18	
November 5	Morocco International: Host: Casablanca, Morocco; Level: International Series; Prize: $8,000; Format: 32MS/32WS/16MD/8WD/16XD	(France) Florent Riancho (United States) Bjorn Seguin	(Slovakia) Milan Dratva (Slovakia) Matej Hlinican
November 5	Morocco International: Host: Casablanca, Morocco; Level: International Series; Prize: $8,000; Format: 32MS/32WS/16MD/8WD/16XD	Score: 21–15, 21–17	
November 5	Morocco International: Host: Casablanca, Morocco; Level: International Series; Prize: $8,000; Format: 32MS/32WS/16MD/8WD/16XD	(Estonia) Kristin Kuuba (Estonia) Helina Rüütel	(Jordan) Haneen Derar Al-Wedyan (Jordan) Domou Amro
November 5	Morocco International: Host: Casablanca, Morocco; Level: International Series; Prize: $8,000; Format: 32MS/32WS/16MD/8WD/16XD	Score: 21–8, 21–9	
November 5	Morocco International: Host: Casablanca, Morocco; Level: International Series; Prize: $8,000; Format: 32MS/32WS/16MD/8WD/16XD	(Slovakia) Milan Dratva (Slovakia) Martina Repiska	(Jordan) Bahaedeen Ahmad Alshannik (Jordan) Domou Amro
November 5	Morocco International: Host: Casablanca, Morocco; Level: International Series; Prize: $8,000; Format: 32MS/32WS/16MD/8WD/16XD	Score: 23–21, 21–5	
November 5	Pakistan International: Host: Islamabad, Pakistan; Level: International Series; Prize: $8,000; Format: 32MS/32WS/32MD/8WD/16XD	(Vietnam) Le Duc Phat	(Turkey) Emre Lale
November 5	Pakistan International: Host: Islamabad, Pakistan; Level: International Series; Prize: $8,000; Format: 32MS/32WS/32MD/8WD/16XD	Score: 15–21, 21–11, 21–11	
November 5	Pakistan International: Host: Islamabad, Pakistan; Level: International Series; Prize: $8,000; Format: 32MS/32WS/32MD/8WD/16XD	(Pakistan) Mahoor Shahzad	(Sri Lanka) Hasini Nusaka Ambalangodage
November 5	Pakistan International: Host: Islamabad, Pakistan; Level: International Series; Prize: $8,000; Format: 32MS/32WS/32MD/8WD/16XD	Score: 21–15, 21–19	
November 5	Pakistan International: Host: Islamabad, Pakistan; Level: International Series; Prize: $8,000; Format: 32MS/32WS/32MD/8WD/16XD	(Pakistan) Rizwan Azam (Pakistan) Sulehri Kashif Ali	(Pakistan) Muhammad Irfan Saeed Bhatti (Pakistan) Azeem Sarwar
November 5	Pakistan International: Host: Islamabad, Pakistan; Level: International Series; Prize: $8,000; Format: 32MS/32WS/32MD/8WD/16XD	Score: 21–18, 21–18	
November 5	Pakistan International: Host: Islamabad, Pakistan; Level: International Series; Prize: $8,000; Format: 32MS/32WS/32MD/8WD/16XD	(Pakistan) Palwasha Bashir (Pakistan) Khizra Rasheed	(Pakistan) Sehra Akram (Pakistan) Huma Javeed
November 5	Pakistan International: Host: Islamabad, Pakistan; Level: International Series; Prize: $8,000; Format: 32MS/32WS/32MD/8WD/16XD	Score: 21–12, 21–11	
November 5	Pakistan International: Host: Islamabad, Pakistan; Level: International Series; Prize: $8,000; Format: 32MS/32WS/32MD/8WD/16XD	(Nepal) Dipesh Dhami (Nepal) Shova Gauchan	(Nepal) Ratnajit Tamang (Nepal) Nangsal Tamang
November 5	Pakistan International: Host: Islamabad, Pakistan; Level: International Series; Prize: $8,000; Format: 32MS/32WS/32MD/8WD/16XD	Score: 21–14, 21–13	
November 12	China Open (Draw): Host: Fuzhou, China; Level: Superseries Premier; Prize: $700,000; Format: 32MS/32WS/32MD/32WD/32XD	(China) Chen Long	(Denmark) Viktor Axelsen
November 12	China Open (Draw): Host: Fuzhou, China; Level: Superseries Premier; Prize: $700,000; Format: 32MS/32WS/32MD/32WD/32XD	Score: 21–16, 14–21, 21–13	
November 12	China Open (Draw): Host: Fuzhou, China; Level: Superseries Premier; Prize: $700,000; Format: 32MS/32WS/32MD/32WD/32XD	(Japan) Akane Yamaguchi	(China) Gao Fangjie
November 12	China Open (Draw): Host: Fuzhou, China; Level: Superseries Premier; Prize: $700,000; Format: 32MS/32WS/32MD/32WD/32XD	Score: 21–13, 21–15	
November 12	China Open (Draw): Host: Fuzhou, China; Level: Superseries Premier; Prize: $700,000; Format: 32MS/32WS/32MD/32WD/32XD	(Indonesia) Marcus Fernaldi Gideon (Indonesia) Kevin Sanjaya Sukamuljo	(Denmark) Mathias Boe (Denmark) Carsten Mogensen
November 12	China Open (Draw): Host: Fuzhou, China; Level: Superseries Premier; Prize: $700,000; Format: 32MS/32WS/32MD/32WD/32XD	Score: 21–19, 21–11	
November 12	China Open (Draw): Host: Fuzhou, China; Level: Superseries Premier; Prize: $700,000; Format: 32MS/32WS/32MD/32WD/32XD	(China) Chen Qingchen (China) Jia Yifan	(South Korea) Kim Hye-rin (South Korea) Lee So-hee
November 12	China Open (Draw): Host: Fuzhou, China; Level: Superseries Premier; Prize: $700,000; Format: 32MS/32WS/32MD/32WD/32XD	Score: 21–7, 18–21, 21–14	
November 12	China Open (Draw): Host: Fuzhou, China; Level: Superseries Premier; Prize: $700,000; Format: 32MS/32WS/32MD/32WD/32XD	(China) Zheng Siwei (China) Huang Yaqiong	(Denmark) Mathias Christiansen (Denmark) Christinna Pedersen
November 12	China Open (Draw): Host: Fuzhou, China; Level: Superseries Premier; Prize: $700,000; Format: 32MS/32WS/32MD/32WD/32XD	Score: 21–15, 21–11	
November 12	Malaysia International: Host: Pasir Gudang, Malaysia; Level: International Challenge; Prize: $20,000; Format: 64MS/32WS/32MD/32WD/32XD	(Malaysia) Iskandar Zulkarnain Zainuddin	(Malaysia) Leong Jun Hao
November 12	Malaysia International: Host: Pasir Gudang, Malaysia; Level: International Challenge; Prize: $20,000; Format: 64MS/32WS/32MD/32WD/32XD	Score: 21–11, 21–13	
November 12	Malaysia International: Host: Pasir Gudang, Malaysia; Level: International Challenge; Prize: $20,000; Format: 64MS/32WS/32MD/32WD/32XD	(Indonesia) Ruselli Hartawan	(Chinese Taipei) Lin Ying-chun
November 12	Malaysia International: Host: Pasir Gudang, Malaysia; Level: International Challenge; Prize: $20,000; Format: 64MS/32WS/32MD/32WD/32XD	Score: 21–14, 21–13	
November 12	Malaysia International: Host: Pasir Gudang, Malaysia; Level: International Challenge; Prize: $20,000; Format: 64MS/32WS/32MD/32WD/32XD	(Malaysia) Goh Sze Fei (Malaysia) Nur Izzuddin	(Malaysia) Shia Chun Kang (Malaysia) Tan Wee Gieen
November 12	Malaysia International: Host: Pasir Gudang, Malaysia; Level: International Challenge; Prize: $20,000; Format: 64MS/32WS/32MD/32WD/32XD	Score: 21–19, 21–12	
November 12	Malaysia International: Host: Pasir Gudang, Malaysia; Level: International Challenge; Prize: $20,000; Format: 64MS/32WS/32MD/32WD/32XD	(Japan) Misato Aratama (Japan) Akane Watanabe	(Thailand) Kittipak Dubthuk (Thailand) Natcha Saengchote
November 12	Malaysia International: Host: Pasir Gudang, Malaysia; Level: International Challenge; Prize: $20,000; Format: 64MS/32WS/32MD/32WD/32XD	Score: 21–18, 21–15	
November 12	Malaysia International: Host: Pasir Gudang, Malaysia; Level: International Challenge; Prize: $20,000; Format: 64MS/32WS/32MD/32WD/32XD	(Japan) Hiroki Okamura (Japan) Naru Shinoya	(Malaysia) Yogendran Khrishnan (India) Prajakta Sawant
November 12	Malaysia International: Host: Pasir Gudang, Malaysia; Level: International Challenge; Prize: $20,000; Format: 64MS/32WS/32MD/32WD/32XD	Score: 21–10, 24–22	
November 12	Suriname International: Host: Paramaribo, Suriname; Level: International Series; Prize: $8,000; Format: 32MS/32WS/32MD/16WD/32XD	(Canada) Brian Yang	(Cuba) Osleni Guerrero
November 12	Suriname International: Host: Paramaribo, Suriname; Level: International Series; Prize: $8,000; Format: 32MS/32WS/32MD/16WD/32XD	Score: 12–21, 21–17, 21–14	
November 12	Suriname International: Host: Paramaribo, Suriname; Level: International Series; Prize: $8,000; Format: 32MS/32WS/32MD/16WD/32XD	(Cuba) Tahimara Oropeza	(Peru) Fernanda Saponara Rivva
November 12	Suriname International: Host: Paramaribo, Suriname; Level: International Series; Prize: $8,000; Format: 32MS/32WS/32MD/16WD/32XD	Score: 21–19, 21–8	
November 12	Suriname International: Host: Paramaribo, Suriname; Level: International Series; Prize: $8,000; Format: 32MS/32WS/32MD/16WD/32XD	(Jamaica) Dennis Coke (Jamaica) Anthony Mcnee	(Jamaica) Gareth Henry (Jamaica) Samuel O'Brien Ricketts
November 12	Suriname International: Host: Paramaribo, Suriname; Level: International Series; Prize: $8,000; Format: 32MS/32WS/32MD/16WD/32XD	Score: 8–21, 21–19, 21–18	
November 12	Suriname International: Host: Paramaribo, Suriname; Level: International Series; Prize: $8,000; Format: 32MS/32WS/32MD/16WD/32XD	(Barbados) Monyata Riviera (Barbados) Tamisha Williams	(Suriname) Crystal Leefmans (Suriname) Priscila Tjitrodipo
November 12	Suriname International: Host: Paramaribo, Suriname; Level: International Series; Prize: $8,000; Format: 32MS/32WS/32MD/16WD/32XD	Score: 21–17, 21–17	
November 12	Suriname International: Host: Paramaribo, Suriname; Level: International Series; Prize: $8,000; Format: 32MS/32WS/32MD/16WD/32XD	(Cuba) Leodannis Martinez (Cuba) Tahimara Oropeza	(Jamaica) Dennis Coke (Jamaica) Katherine Wynter
November 12	Suriname International: Host: Paramaribo, Suriname; Level: International Series; Prize: $8,000; Format: 32MS/32WS/32MD/16WD/32XD	Score: 21–16, 21–18	
November 12	Norwegian International: Host: Sandefjord, Norway; Level: International Series; Prize: $8,000; Format: 32MS/32WS/32MD/32WD/32XD	(Indonesia) Hermansah	(Denmark) David Kim
November 12	Norwegian International: Host: Sandefjord, Norway; Level: International Series; Prize: $8,000; Format: 32MS/32WS/32MD/32WD/32XD	Score: 20–22, 21–12, 21–15	
November 12	Norwegian International: Host: Sandefjord, Norway; Level: International Series; Prize: $8,000; Format: 32MS/32WS/32MD/32WD/32XD	(India) Saili Rane	(Estonia) Kristin Kuuba
November 12	Norwegian International: Host: Sandefjord, Norway; Level: International Series; Prize: $8,000; Format: 32MS/32WS/32MD/32WD/32XD	Score: 21–18, 21–9	
November 12	Norwegian International: Host: Sandefjord, Norway; Level: International Series; Prize: $8,000; Format: 32MS/32WS/32MD/32WD/32XD	(Denmark) Joel Eipe (Denmark) Philip Seerup	(England) Matthew Clare (England) David King
November 12	Norwegian International: Host: Sandefjord, Norway; Level: International Series; Prize: $8,000; Format: 32MS/32WS/32MD/32WD/32XD	Score: 21–8, 18–21, 21–19	
November 12	Norwegian International: Host: Sandefjord, Norway; Level: International Series; Prize: $8,000; Format: 32MS/32WS/32MD/32WD/32XD	(Denmark) Alexandra Bøje (Denmark) Sara Lundgaard	(Denmark) Isabella Nielsen (Denmark) Claudia Paredes
November 12	Norwegian International: Host: Sandefjord, Norway; Level: International Series; Prize: $8,000; Format: 32MS/32WS/32MD/32WD/32XD	Score: 21–19, 21–9	
November 12	Norwegian International: Host: Sandefjord, Norway; Level: International Series; Prize: $8,000; Format: 32MS/32WS/32MD/32WD/32XD	(England) Gregory Mairs (England) Jenny Moore	(Denmark) Lasse Mølhede (Denmark) Alexandra Bøje
November 12	Norwegian International: Host: Sandefjord, Norway; Level: International Series; Prize: $8,000; Format: 32MS/32WS/32MD/32WD/32XD	Score: 21–11, 19–21, 21–11	
November 19	Hong Kong Open (Draw): Host: Kowloon, Hong Kong; Level: Superseries; Prize: $400,000; Format: 32MS/32WS/32MD/32WD/32XD	(Malaysia) Lee Chong Wei	(China) Chen Long
November 19	Hong Kong Open (Draw): Host: Kowloon, Hong Kong; Level: Superseries; Prize: $400,000; Format: 32MS/32WS/32MD/32WD/32XD	Score: 21–14, 21–19	
November 19	Hong Kong Open (Draw): Host: Kowloon, Hong Kong; Level: Superseries; Prize: $400,000; Format: 32MS/32WS/32MD/32WD/32XD	(Chinese Taipei) Tai Tzu-ying	(India) P. V. Sindhu
November 19	Hong Kong Open (Draw): Host: Kowloon, Hong Kong; Level: Superseries; Prize: $400,000; Format: 32MS/32WS/32MD/32WD/32XD	Score: 21–18, 21–18	
November 19	Hong Kong Open (Draw): Host: Kowloon, Hong Kong; Level: Superseries; Prize: $400,000; Format: 32MS/32WS/32MD/32WD/32XD	(Indonesia) Marcus Fernaldi Gideon (Indonesia) Kevin Sanjaya Sukamuljo	(Denmark) Mads Conrad-Petersen (Denmark) Mads Pieler Kolding
November 19	Hong Kong Open (Draw): Host: Kowloon, Hong Kong; Level: Superseries; Prize: $400,000; Format: 32MS/32WS/32MD/32WD/32XD	Score: 21–12, 21–18	
November 19	Hong Kong Open (Draw): Host: Kowloon, Hong Kong; Level: Superseries; Prize: $400,000; Format: 32MS/32WS/32MD/32WD/32XD	(China) Chen Qingchen (China) Jia Yifan	(Indonesia) Greysia Polii (Indonesia) Apriyani Rahayu
November 19	Hong Kong Open (Draw): Host: Kowloon, Hong Kong; Level: Superseries; Prize: $400,000; Format: 32MS/32WS/32MD/32WD/32XD	Score: 14–21, 21–16, 21–15	
November 19	Hong Kong Open (Draw): Host: Kowloon, Hong Kong; Level: Superseries; Prize: $400,000; Format: 32MS/32WS/32MD/32WD/32XD	(China) Zheng Siwei (China) Huang Yaqiong	(Denmark) Mathias Christiansen (Denmark) Christinna Pedersen
November 19	Hong Kong Open (Draw): Host: Kowloon, Hong Kong; Level: Superseries; Prize: $400,000; Format: 32MS/32WS/32MD/32WD/32XD	Score: 21–15, 21–13	
November 19	Scottish Open (Draw): Host: Glasgow, Scotland; Level: Grand Prix; Prize: $65,000; Format: 64MS/32WS/32MD/32WD/32XD	(England) Toby Penty	(France) Lucas Corvée
November 19	Scottish Open (Draw): Host: Glasgow, Scotland; Level: Grand Prix; Prize: $65,000; Format: 64MS/32WS/32MD/32WD/32XD	Score: 21–14, 24–22	
November 19	Scottish Open (Draw): Host: Glasgow, Scotland; Level: Grand Prix; Prize: $65,000; Format: 64MS/32WS/32MD/32WD/32XD	(Scotland) Kirsty Gilmour	(Denmark) Mia Blichfeldt
November 19	Scottish Open (Draw): Host: Glasgow, Scotland; Level: Grand Prix; Prize: $65,000; Format: 64MS/32WS/32MD/32WD/32XD	Score: 23–21, 21–12	
November 19	Scottish Open (Draw): Host: Glasgow, Scotland; Level: Grand Prix; Prize: $65,000; Format: 64MS/32WS/32MD/32WD/32XD	(Netherlands) Jelle Maas (Netherlands) Robin Tabeling	(Netherlands) Jacco Arends (Netherlands) Ruben Jille
November 19	Scottish Open (Draw): Host: Glasgow, Scotland; Level: Grand Prix; Prize: $65,000; Format: 64MS/32WS/32MD/32WD/32XD	Score: 21–11, 21–15	
November 19	Scottish Open (Draw): Host: Glasgow, Scotland; Level: Grand Prix; Prize: $65,000; Format: 64MS/32WS/32MD/32WD/32XD	(Netherlands) Selena Piek (Netherlands) Cheryl Seinen	(Russia) Ekaterina Bolotova (Russia) Alina Davletova
November 19	Scottish Open (Draw): Host: Glasgow, Scotland; Level: Grand Prix; Prize: $65,000; Format: 64MS/32WS/32MD/32WD/32XD	Score: 15–21, 21–15, 21–11	
November 19	Scottish Open (Draw): Host: Glasgow, Scotland; Level: Grand Prix; Prize: $65,000; Format: 64MS/32WS/32MD/32WD/32XD	(Netherlands) Jacco Arends (Netherlands) Selena Piek	(Denmark) Mikkel Mikkelsen (Denmark) Mai Surrow
November 19	Scottish Open (Draw): Host: Glasgow, Scotland; Level: Grand Prix; Prize: $65,000; Format: 64MS/32WS/32MD/32WD/32XD	Score: 21–10, 21–10	
November 19	Botswana International: Host: Lobatse, Botswana; Level: International Series; Prize: $8,000; Format: 32MS/32WS/32MD/16WD/32XD	(Mexico) Luis Ramon Garrido	(Italy) Rosario Maddaloni
November 19	Botswana International: Host: Lobatse, Botswana; Level: International Series; Prize: $8,000; Format: 32MS/32WS/32MD/16WD/32XD	Score: 21–13, 21–17	
November 19	Botswana International: Host: Lobatse, Botswana; Level: International Series; Prize: $8,000; Format: 32MS/32WS/32MD/16WD/32XD	(South Africa) Johanita Scholtz	(Uganda) Aisha Nakiyemba
November 19	Botswana International: Host: Lobatse, Botswana; Level: International Series; Prize: $8,000; Format: 32MS/32WS/32MD/16WD/32XD	Score: 21–10, 21–17	
November 19	Botswana International: Host: Lobatse, Botswana; Level: International Series; Prize: $8,000; Format: 32MS/32WS/32MD/16WD/32XD	(India) Adarsh Kumar (India) Jagadish Yadav	(Mauritius) Aatish Lubah (Mauritius) Georges Julien Paul
November 19	Botswana International: Host: Lobatse, Botswana; Level: International Series; Prize: $8,000; Format: 32MS/32WS/32MD/16WD/32XD	Score: 21–14, 20–22, 22–20	
November 19	Botswana International: Host: Lobatse, Botswana; Level: International Series; Prize: $8,000; Format: 32MS/32WS/32MD/16WD/32XD	(South Africa) Michelle Butler-Emmett (South Africa) Jennifer Fry	(Italy) Silvia Garino (Italy) Lisa Iversen
November 19	Botswana International: Host: Lobatse, Botswana; Level: International Series; Prize: $8,000; Format: 32MS/32WS/32MD/16WD/32XD	Score: 26–24, 21–16	
November 19	Botswana International: Host: Lobatse, Botswana; Level: International Series; Prize: $8,000; Format: 32MS/32WS/32MD/16WD/32XD	(South Africa) Andries Malan (South Africa) Jennifer Fry	(Mauritius) Georges Julien Paul (Mauritius) Aurelie Marie Elisa Allet
November 19	Botswana International: Host: Lobatse, Botswana; Level: International Series; Prize: $8,000; Format: 32MS/32WS/32MD/16WD/32XD	Score: 21–15, 21–13	
November 19	India International: Host: Hyderabad, India; Level: International Series; Prize: $8,000; Format: 32MS/32WS/32MD/32WD/32XD	(India) Lakshya Sen	(Malaysia) Chong Yee Han
November 19	India International: Host: Hyderabad, India; Level: International Series; Prize: $8,000; Format: 32MS/32WS/32MD/32WD/32XD	Score: 21–15, 17–21, 21–17	
November 19	India International: Host: Hyderabad, India; Level: International Series; Prize: $8,000; Format: 32MS/32WS/32MD/32WD/32XD	(India) Tanishq Mamilla Palli	(India) Shikha Gautam
November 19	India International: Host: Hyderabad, India; Level: International Series; Prize: $8,000; Format: 32MS/32WS/32MD/32WD/32XD	Score: 17–21, 22–20, 21–18	
November 19	India International: Host: Hyderabad, India; Level: International Series; Prize: $8,000; Format: 32MS/32WS/32MD/32WD/32XD	(India) Arun George (India) Sanyam Shukla	(India) Alwin Francis (India) Nandagopal Kidambi
November 19	India International: Host: Hyderabad, India; Level: International Series; Prize: $8,000; Format: 32MS/32WS/32MD/32WD/32XD	Score: 21–19, 21–15	
November 19	India International: Host: Hyderabad, India; Level: International Series; Prize: $8,000; Format: 32MS/32WS/32MD/32WD/32XD	(Singapore) Putri Sari Dewi Citra (Singapore) Jin Yujia	(Malaysia) Lim Jee Lynn (Malaysia) Yap Zhen
November 19	India International: Host: Hyderabad, India; Level: International Series; Prize: $8,000; Format: 32MS/32WS/32MD/32WD/32XD	Score: 20–22, 21–9, 21–13	
November 19	India International: Host: Hyderabad, India; Level: International Series; Prize: $8,000; Format: 32MS/32WS/32MD/32WD/32XD	(Malaysia) Chen Tang Jie (Malaysia) Goh Liu Ying	(India) Rohan Kapoor (India) Kuhoo Garg
November 19	India International: Host: Hyderabad, India; Level: International Series; Prize: $8,000; Format: 32MS/32WS/32MD/32WD/32XD	Score: 21–19, 21–13	
November 26	Korea Masters (Draw): Host: Gwangju, South Korea; Level: Grand Prix Gold; Prize: $120,000; Format: 64MS/32WS/32MD/32WD/32XD	(South Korea) Jeon Hyeok-jin	(South Korea) Kim Min-ki
November 26	Korea Masters (Draw): Host: Gwangju, South Korea; Level: Grand Prix Gold; Prize: $120,000; Format: 64MS/32WS/32MD/32WD/32XD	Score: 21–17, 19–21, 21–12	
November 26	Korea Masters (Draw): Host: Gwangju, South Korea; Level: Grand Prix Gold; Prize: $120,000; Format: 64MS/32WS/32MD/32WD/32XD	(China) Gao Fangjie	(South Korea) Lee Jang-mi
November 26	Korea Masters (Draw): Host: Gwangju, South Korea; Level: Grand Prix Gold; Prize: $120,000; Format: 64MS/32WS/32MD/32WD/32XD	Score: 21–19, 21–5	
November 26	Korea Masters (Draw): Host: Gwangju, South Korea; Level: Grand Prix Gold; Prize: $120,000; Format: 64MS/32WS/32MD/32WD/32XD	(South Korea) Kim Won-ho (South Korea) Seo Seung-jae	(South Korea) Jung Jae-wook (South Korea) Kim Gi-jung
November 26	Korea Masters (Draw): Host: Gwangju, South Korea; Level: Grand Prix Gold; Prize: $120,000; Format: 64MS/32WS/32MD/32WD/32XD	Score: 21–15, 21–16	
November 26	Korea Masters (Draw): Host: Gwangju, South Korea; Level: Grand Prix Gold; Prize: $120,000; Format: 64MS/32WS/32MD/32WD/32XD	(South Korea) Lee So-hee (South Korea) Shin Seung-chan	(South Korea) Kim So-yeong (South Korea) Kong Hee-yong
November 26	Korea Masters (Draw): Host: Gwangju, South Korea; Level: Grand Prix Gold; Prize: $120,000; Format: 64MS/32WS/32MD/32WD/32XD	Score: 21–18, 23–21	
November 26	Korea Masters (Draw): Host: Gwangju, South Korea; Level: Grand Prix Gold; Prize: $120,000; Format: 64MS/32WS/32MD/32WD/32XD	(South Korea) Seo Seung-jae (South Korea) Kim Ha-na	(South Korea) Choi Sol-gyu (South Korea) Chae Yoo-jung
November 26	Korea Masters (Draw): Host: Gwangju, South Korea; Level: Grand Prix Gold; Prize: $120,000; Format: 64MS/32WS/32MD/32WD/32XD	Score: 17–21, 21–13, 21–18	
November 26	India International: Host: Mumbai, India; Level: International Challenge; Prize: $20,000; Format: 32MS/32WS/16MD/16WD/16XD	(Thailand) Sitthikom Thammasin	(India) Lakshya Sen
November 26	India International: Host: Mumbai, India; Level: International Challenge; Prize: $20,000; Format: 32MS/32WS/16MD/16WD/16XD	Score: 15–21, 21–14, 21–19	
November 26	India International: Host: Mumbai, India; Level: International Challenge; Prize: $20,000; Format: 32MS/32WS/16MD/16WD/16XD	(India) Ruthvika Shivani Gadde	(India) Mukherjee Riya
November 26	India International: Host: Mumbai, India; Level: International Challenge; Prize: $20,000; Format: 32MS/32WS/16MD/16WD/16XD	Score: 21–12, 23–21	
November 26	India International: Host: Mumbai, India; Level: International Challenge; Prize: $20,000; Format: 32MS/32WS/16MD/16WD/16XD	(Thailand) Maneepong Jongjit (Thailand) Nanthakarn Yordphaisong	(Malaysia) Aaron Chia (Malaysia) Soh Wooi Yik
November 26	India International: Host: Mumbai, India; Level: International Challenge; Prize: $20,000; Format: 32MS/32WS/16MD/16WD/16XD	Score: 21–6, 21–9	
November 26	India International: Host: Mumbai, India; Level: International Challenge; Prize: $20,000; Format: 32MS/32WS/16MD/16WD/16XD	(Hong Kong) Ng Tsz Yau (Hong Kong) Yeung Nga Ting	(Hong Kong) Ng Wing Yung (Hong Kong) Yuen Sin Ying
November 26	India International: Host: Mumbai, India; Level: International Challenge; Prize: $20,000; Format: 32MS/32WS/16MD/16WD/16XD	Score: 23–25, 21–14, 21–19	
November 26	India International: Host: Mumbai, India; Level: International Challenge; Prize: $20,000; Format: 32MS/32WS/16MD/16WD/16XD	(Hong Kong) Mak Hee Chun (Hong Kong) Yeung Nga Ting	(Hong Kong) Chang Tak Ching (Hong Kong) Ng Wing Yung
November 26	India International: Host: Mumbai, India; Level: International Challenge; Prize: $20,000; Format: 32MS/32WS/16MD/16WD/16XD	Score: 21–11, 17–21, 21–18	
November 26	Zambia International: Host: Lusaka, Zambia; Level: International Series; Prize: $8,000; Format: 32MS/32WS/32MD/16WD/16XD	(Israel) Misha Zilberman	(Germany) Jonathan Persson
November 26	Zambia International: Host: Lusaka, Zambia; Level: International Series; Prize: $8,000; Format: 32MS/32WS/32MD/16WD/16XD	Score: 21–15, 21–17	
November 26	Zambia International: Host: Lusaka, Zambia; Level: International Series; Prize: $8,000; Format: 32MS/32WS/32MD/16WD/16XD	(Mauritius) Kate Foo Kune	(Israel) Ksenia Polikarpova
November 26	Zambia International: Host: Lusaka, Zambia; Level: International Series; Prize: $8,000; Format: 32MS/32WS/32MD/16WD/16XD	Score: 14–21, 21–16, 21–18	
November 26	Zambia International: Host: Lusaka, Zambia; Level: International Series; Prize: $8,000; Format: 32MS/32WS/32MD/16WD/16XD	(Mauritius) Aatish Lubah (Mauritius) Georges Julien Paul	(India) Kapil Chaudhary (India) Brijesh Yadav
November 26	Zambia International: Host: Lusaka, Zambia; Level: International Series; Prize: $8,000; Format: 32MS/32WS/32MD/16WD/16XD	Score: 21–17, 21–23, 21–11	
November 26	Zambia International: Host: Lusaka, Zambia; Level: International Series; Prize: $8,000; Format: 32MS/32WS/32MD/16WD/16XD	(Italy) Silvia Garino (Italy) Lisa Iversen	(Uganda) Bridget Shamim Bangi (Uganda) Aisha Nakiyemba
November 26	Zambia International: Host: Lusaka, Zambia; Level: International Series; Prize: $8,000; Format: 32MS/32WS/32MD/16WD/16XD	Score: 21–17, 21–15	
November 26	Zambia International: Host: Lusaka, Zambia; Level: International Series; Prize: $8,000; Format: 32MS/32WS/32MD/16WD/16XD	(Germany) Jonathan Persson (Mauritius) Kate Foo Kune	(Israel) Misha Zilberman (Israel) Svetlana Zilberman
November 26	Zambia International: Host: Lusaka, Zambia; Level: International Series; Prize: $8,000; Format: 32MS/32WS/32MD/16WD/16XD	Score: Walkover	
November 26	Welsh International: Host: Cardiff, Wales; Level: Future Series; Prize: TBC; Format: 32MS/32WS/32MD/32WD/32XD	(Republic of Ireland) Nhat Nguyen	(India) R. M. V. Gurusaidutt
November 26	Welsh International: Host: Cardiff, Wales; Level: Future Series; Prize: TBC; Format: 32MS/32WS/32MD/32WD/32XD	Score: 21–16, 23–21	
November 26	Welsh International: Host: Cardiff, Wales; Level: Future Series; Prize: TBC; Format: 32MS/32WS/32MD/32WD/32XD	(India) Tanvi Lad	(France) Marie Batomene
November 26	Welsh International: Host: Cardiff, Wales; Level: Future Series; Prize: TBC; Format: 32MS/32WS/32MD/32WD/32XD	Score: 21–15, 21–8	
November 26	Welsh International: Host: Cardiff, Wales; Level: Future Series; Prize: TBC; Format: 32MS/32WS/32MD/32WD/32XD	(England) Oliver Baczala (England) Michael Roe	(France) Eloi Adam (France) Samy Corvee
November 26	Welsh International: Host: Cardiff, Wales; Level: Future Series; Prize: TBC; Format: 32MS/32WS/32MD/32WD/32XD	Score: 21–23, 23–21, 22–20	
November 26	Welsh International: Host: Cardiff, Wales; Level: Future Series; Prize: TBC; Format: 32MS/32WS/32MD/32WD/32XD	(Belgium) Lise Jaques (Belgium) Flore Vandenhoucke	(Poland) Kornelia Marczak (Poland) Magdalena Witek
November 26	Welsh International: Host: Cardiff, Wales; Level: Future Series; Prize: TBC; Format: 32MS/32WS/32MD/32WD/32XD	Score: 21–10, 21–15	
November 26	Welsh International: Host: Cardiff, Wales; Level: Future Series; Prize: TBC; Format: 32MS/32WS/32MD/32WD/32XD	(England) Michael Roe (England) Jessica Hopton	(Denmark) Soren Toft Hansen (Denmark) Pernille Bundgaard
November 26	Welsh International: Host: Cardiff, Wales; Level: Future Series; Prize: TBC; Format: 32MS/32WS/32MD/32WD/32XD	Score: 21–18, 11–21, 24–22	

=== December ===
Week of	Tournament	Champions	Runners-up
December 3	Irish Open: Host: Blanchardstown, Republic of Ireland; Level: International Series; Prize: $8,000; Format: 32MS/32WS/32MD/32WD/32XD	(Germany) Alexander Roovers	(Republic of Ireland) Nhat Nguyen
December 3	Irish Open: Host: Blanchardstown, Republic of Ireland; Level: International Series; Prize: $8,000; Format: 32MS/32WS/32MD/32WD/32XD	Score: 21–19, 21–11	
December 3	Irish Open: Host: Blanchardstown, Republic of Ireland; Level: International Series; Prize: $8,000; Format: 32MS/32WS/32MD/32WD/32XD	(Denmark) Anna Thea Madsen	(Netherlands) Soraya de Visch Eijbergen
December 3	Irish Open: Host: Blanchardstown, Republic of Ireland; Level: International Series; Prize: $8,000; Format: 32MS/32WS/32MD/32WD/32XD	Score: 21–13, 21–13	
December 3	Irish Open: Host: Blanchardstown, Republic of Ireland; Level: International Series; Prize: $8,000; Format: 32MS/32WS/32MD/32WD/32XD	(Scotland) Alexander Dunn (Scotland) Adam Hall	(Republic of Ireland) Joshua Magee (Republic of Ireland) Sam Magee
December 3	Irish Open: Host: Blanchardstown, Republic of Ireland; Level: International Series; Prize: $8,000; Format: 32MS/32WS/32MD/32WD/32XD	Score: 21–15, 6–21, 21–10	
December 3	Irish Open: Host: Blanchardstown, Republic of Ireland; Level: International Series; Prize: $8,000; Format: 32MS/32WS/32MD/32WD/32XD	(France) Emilie Lefel (France) Anne Tran	(England) Jenny Moore (England) Victoria Williams
December 3	Irish Open: Host: Blanchardstown, Republic of Ireland; Level: International Series; Prize: $8,000; Format: 32MS/32WS/32MD/32WD/32XD	Score: 21–16, 21–12	
December 3	Irish Open: Host: Blanchardstown, Republic of Ireland; Level: International Series; Prize: $8,000; Format: 32MS/32WS/32MD/32WD/32XD	(England) Gregory Mairs (England) Jenny Moore	(Republic of Ireland) Sam Magee (Republic of Ireland) Chloe Magee
December 3	Irish Open: Host: Blanchardstown, Republic of Ireland; Level: International Series; Prize: $8,000; Format: 32MS/32WS/32MD/32WD/32XD	Score: 21–16, 21–13	
December 3	South Africa International: Host: Pretoria, South Africa; Level: International Series; Prize: $8,000; Format: 64MS/16WS/32MD/8WD/32XD	(Belgium) Maxime Moreels	(Mauritius) Georges Julien Paul
December 3	South Africa International: Host: Pretoria, South Africa; Level: International Series; Prize: $8,000; Format: 64MS/16WS/32MD/8WD/32XD	Score: 19–21, 21–15, 22–20	
December 3	South Africa International: Host: Pretoria, South Africa; Level: International Series; Prize: $8,000; Format: 64MS/16WS/32MD/8WD/32XD	(India) Vaishnavi Reddy Jakka	(Mauritius) Kate Foo Kune
December 3	South Africa International: Host: Pretoria, South Africa; Level: International Series; Prize: $8,000; Format: 64MS/16WS/32MD/8WD/32XD	Score: 21–10, 21–10	
December 3	South Africa International: Host: Pretoria, South Africa; Level: International Series; Prize: $8,000; Format: 64MS/16WS/32MD/8WD/32XD	(India) Tarun Kona (India) Saurabh Sharma	(Mauritius) Aatish Lubah (Mauritius) Georges Julien Paul
December 3	South Africa International: Host: Pretoria, South Africa; Level: International Series; Prize: $8,000; Format: 64MS/16WS/32MD/8WD/32XD	Score: 21–9, 21–15	
December 3	South Africa International: Host: Pretoria, South Africa; Level: International Series; Prize: $8,000; Format: 64MS/16WS/32MD/8WD/32XD	(South Africa) Michelle Butler-Emmett (South Africa) Jennifer Fry	(South Africa) Demi Botha (South Africa) Lee-Ann De Wet
December 3	South Africa International: Host: Pretoria, South Africa; Level: International Series; Prize: $8,000; Format: 64MS/16WS/32MD/8WD/32XD	Score: 21–17, 21–19	
December 3	South Africa International: Host: Pretoria, South Africa; Level: International Series; Prize: $8,000; Format: 64MS/16WS/32MD/8WD/32XD	(South Africa) Andries Malan (South Africa) Jennifer Fry	(India) Saurabh Sharma (India) Anoushka Parikh
December 3	South Africa International: Host: Pretoria, South Africa; Level: International Series; Prize: $8,000; Format: 64MS/16WS/32MD/8WD/32XD	Score: 21–19, 21–19	
December 10	BWF Superseries Finals (Draw): Host: Dubai, United Arab Emirates; Level: Superseries Finals; Prize: $1,000,000; Format: 8MS/8WS/8MD/8WD/8XD	(Denmark) Viktor Axelsen	(Malaysia) Lee Chong Wei
December 10	BWF Superseries Finals (Draw): Host: Dubai, United Arab Emirates; Level: Superseries Finals; Prize: $1,000,000; Format: 8MS/8WS/8MD/8WD/8XD	Score: 19–21, 21–19, 21–15	
December 10	BWF Superseries Finals (Draw): Host: Dubai, United Arab Emirates; Level: Superseries Finals; Prize: $1,000,000; Format: 8MS/8WS/8MD/8WD/8XD	(Japan) Akane Yamaguchi	(India) P. V. Sindhu
December 10	BWF Superseries Finals (Draw): Host: Dubai, United Arab Emirates; Level: Superseries Finals; Prize: $1,000,000; Format: 8MS/8WS/8MD/8WD/8XD	Score: 15–21, 21–12, 21–19	
December 10	BWF Superseries Finals (Draw): Host: Dubai, United Arab Emirates; Level: Superseries Finals; Prize: $1,000,000; Format: 8MS/8WS/8MD/8WD/8XD	(Indonesia) Marcus Fernaldi Gideon (Indonesia) Kevin Sanjaya Sukamuljo	(China) Liu Cheng (China) Zhang Nan
December 10	BWF Superseries Finals (Draw): Host: Dubai, United Arab Emirates; Level: Superseries Finals; Prize: $1,000,000; Format: 8MS/8WS/8MD/8WD/8XD	Score: 21–16, 21–15	
December 10	BWF Superseries Finals (Draw): Host: Dubai, United Arab Emirates; Level: Superseries Finals; Prize: $1,000,000; Format: 8MS/8WS/8MD/8WD/8XD	(Japan) Shiho Tanaka (Japan) Koharu Yonemoto	(Japan) Yuki Fukushima (Japan) Sayaka Hirota
December 10	BWF Superseries Finals (Draw): Host: Dubai, United Arab Emirates; Level: Superseries Finals; Prize: $1,000,000; Format: 8MS/8WS/8MD/8WD/8XD	Score: 21–16, 21–15	
December 10	BWF Superseries Finals (Draw): Host: Dubai, United Arab Emirates; Level: Superseries Finals; Prize: $1,000,000; Format: 8MS/8WS/8MD/8WD/8XD	(China) Zheng Siwei (China) Chen Qingchen	(Hong Kong) Tang Chun Man (Hong Kong) Tse Ying Suet
December 10	BWF Superseries Finals (Draw): Host: Dubai, United Arab Emirates; Level: Superseries Finals; Prize: $1,000,000; Format: 8MS/8WS/8MD/8WD/8XD	Score: 21–15, 22–20	
December 10	Italian International: Host: Milan, Italy; Level: International Challenge; Prize: $20,000; Format: 32MS/32WS/32MD/32WD/32XD	(Spain) Pablo Abián	(Germany) Lars Schänzler
December 10	Italian International: Host: Milan, Italy; Level: International Challenge; Prize: $20,000; Format: 32MS/32WS/32MD/32WD/32XD	Score: 18–21, 21–16, 21–14	
December 10	Italian International: Host: Milan, Italy; Level: International Challenge; Prize: $20,000; Format: 32MS/32WS/32MD/32WD/32XD	(Vietnam) Nguyen Thuy Linh	(Denmark) Line Christophersen
December 10	Italian International: Host: Milan, Italy; Level: International Challenge; Prize: $20,000; Format: 32MS/32WS/32MD/32WD/32XD	Score: 24–22, 16–21, 23–21	
December 10	Italian International: Host: Milan, Italy; Level: International Challenge; Prize: $20,000; Format: 32MS/32WS/32MD/32WD/32XD	(Netherlands) Jelle Maas (Netherlands) Robin Tabeling	(Poland) Milosz Bochat (Poland) Adam Cwalina
December 10	Italian International: Host: Milan, Italy; Level: International Challenge; Prize: $20,000; Format: 32MS/32WS/32MD/32WD/32XD	Score: 23–21, 21–18	
December 10	Italian International: Host: Milan, Italy; Level: International Challenge; Prize: $20,000; Format: 32MS/32WS/32MD/32WD/32XD	(Russia) Ekaterina Bolotova (Russia) Alina Davletova	(Denmark) Alexandra Bøje (Denmark) Sara Lundgaard
December 10	Italian International: Host: Milan, Italy; Level: International Challenge; Prize: $20,000; Format: 32MS/32WS/32MD/32WD/32XD	Score: 21–18, 21–11	
December 10	Italian International: Host: Milan, Italy; Level: International Challenge; Prize: $20,000; Format: 32MS/32WS/32MD/32WD/32XD	(England) Ben Lane (England) Jessica Pugh	(England) Marcus Ellis (England) Lauren Smith
December 10	Italian International: Host: Milan, Italy; Level: International Challenge; Prize: $20,000; Format: 32MS/32WS/32MD/32WD/32XD	Score: 16–21, 21–19, 21–4	
December 17	Yonex / K&D Graphics International: Host: Orange, United States; Level: International Challenge; Prize: $20,000; Format: 32MS/32WS/32MD/32WD/32XD	(Chinese Taipei) Lu Chia-hung	(Canada) B. R. Sankeerth
December 17	Yonex / K&D Graphics International: Host: Orange, United States; Level: International Challenge; Prize: $20,000; Format: 32MS/32WS/32MD/32WD/32XD	Score: 14–21, 21–15, 21–16	
December 17	Yonex / K&D Graphics International: Host: Orange, United States; Level: International Challenge; Prize: $20,000; Format: 32MS/32WS/32MD/32WD/32XD	(Japan) Natsuki Nidaira	(Canada) Olivia Lei
December 17	Yonex / K&D Graphics International: Host: Orange, United States; Level: International Challenge; Prize: $20,000; Format: 32MS/32WS/32MD/32WD/32XD	Score: 21–12, 21–13	
December 17	Yonex / K&D Graphics International: Host: Orange, United States; Level: International Challenge; Prize: $20,000; Format: 32MS/32WS/32MD/32WD/32XD	(England) Marcus Ellis (England) Chris Langridge	(Chinese Taipei) Lu Chia-hung (Chinese Taipei) Lu Chia-pin
December 17	Yonex / K&D Graphics International: Host: Orange, United States; Level: International Challenge; Prize: $20,000; Format: 32MS/32WS/32MD/32WD/32XD	Score: 21–14, 21–17	
December 17	Yonex / K&D Graphics International: Host: Orange, United States; Level: International Challenge; Prize: $20,000; Format: 32MS/32WS/32MD/32WD/32XD	(Canada) Rachel Honderich (Canada) Kristen Tsai	(Australia) Leanne Choo (Australia) Renuga Veeran
December 17	Yonex / K&D Graphics International: Host: Orange, United States; Level: International Challenge; Prize: $20,000; Format: 32MS/32WS/32MD/32WD/32XD	Score: 21–12, 21–15	
December 17	Yonex / K&D Graphics International: Host: Orange, United States; Level: International Challenge; Prize: $20,000; Format: 32MS/32WS/32MD/32WD/32XD	(Canada) Nyl Yakura (Canada) Kristen Tsai	(New Zealand) Oliver Leydon-Davis (New Zealand) Susannah Leydon-Davis
December 17	Yonex / K&D Graphics International: Host: Orange, United States; Level: International Challenge; Prize: $20,000; Format: 32MS/32WS/32MD/32WD/32XD	Score: 21–11, 21–8	
December 17	Turkey International: Host: Ankara, Turkey; Level: International Series; Prize: $8,000; Format: 32MS/32WS/32MD/32WD/32XD	(France) Lucas Claerbout	(Turkey) Muhammed Ali Kurt
December 17	Turkey International: Host: Ankara, Turkey; Level: International Series; Prize: $8,000; Format: 32MS/32WS/32MD/32WD/32XD	Score: 21–16, 21–10	
December 17	Turkey International: Host: Ankara, Turkey; Level: International Series; Prize: $8,000; Format: 32MS/32WS/32MD/32WD/32XD	(Turkey) Ozge Bayrak	(Turkey) Neslihan Yigit
December 17	Turkey International: Host: Ankara, Turkey; Level: International Series; Prize: $8,000; Format: 32MS/32WS/32MD/32WD/32XD	Score: 21–17, 21–17	
December 17	Turkey International: Host: Ankara, Turkey; Level: International Series; Prize: $8,000; Format: 32MS/32WS/32MD/32WD/32XD	(Scotland) Alexander Dunn (Scotland) Adam Hall	(Denmark) Mikkel Stoffersen (Denmark) Mathias Thyrri
December 17	Turkey International: Host: Ankara, Turkey; Level: International Series; Prize: $8,000; Format: 32MS/32WS/32MD/32WD/32XD	Score: 21–14, 21–9	
December 17	Turkey International: Host: Ankara, Turkey; Level: International Series; Prize: $8,000; Format: 32MS/32WS/32MD/32WD/32XD	(Turkey) Bengisu Ercetin (Turkey) Nazlıcan Inci	(Ukraine) Maryna Ilyinskaya (Ukraine) Yelyzaveta Zharka
December 17	Turkey International: Host: Ankara, Turkey; Level: International Series; Prize: $8,000; Format: 32MS/32WS/32MD/32WD/32XD	Score: 21–13, 21–18	
December 17	Turkey International: Host: Ankara, Turkey; Level: International Series; Prize: $8,000; Format: 32MS/32WS/32MD/32WD/32XD	(Germany) Peter Kaesbauer (Germany) Olga Konon	(Ukraine) Valeriy Atrashchenkov (Ukraine) Yelyzaveta Zharka
December 17	Turkey International: Host: Ankara, Turkey; Level: International Series; Prize: $8,000; Format: 32MS/32WS/32MD/32WD/32XD	Score: 21–18, 22–20	
December 17	Nepal International: Host: Kathmandu, Nepal; Level: International Series; Prize: $8,000; Format: 64MS/32WS/32MD/16WD/32XD	(India) Shreyansh Jaiswal	(India) Lakhanee Sarang
December 17	Nepal International: Host: Kathmandu, Nepal; Level: International Series; Prize: $8,000; Format: 64MS/32WS/32MD/16WD/32XD	Score: 21–10, 21–10	
December 17	Nepal International: Host: Kathmandu, Nepal; Level: International Series; Prize: $8,000; Format: 64MS/32WS/32MD/16WD/32XD	(Hong Kong) Joy Xuan Deng	(Iran) Sorayya Aghaei
December 17	Nepal International: Host: Kathmandu, Nepal; Level: International Series; Prize: $8,000; Format: 64MS/32WS/32MD/16WD/32XD	Score: 21–12, 21–5	
December 17	Nepal International: Host: Kathmandu, Nepal; Level: International Series; Prize: $8,000; Format: 64MS/32WS/32MD/16WD/32XD	(Singapore) Danny Bawa Chrisnanta (Singapore) Terry Hee Yong Kai	(Malaysia) Ian Wong Jien Sern (Malaysia) Tan Chee Tean
December 17	Nepal International: Host: Kathmandu, Nepal; Level: International Series; Prize: $8,000; Format: 64MS/32WS/32MD/16WD/32XD	Score: 22–20, 14–21, 21–16	
December 17	Nepal International: Host: Kathmandu, Nepal; Level: International Series; Prize: $8,000; Format: 64MS/32WS/32MD/16WD/32XD	(India) Aparna Balan (India) Sruthi K.P	(India) Harika Veludurthi (India) Karishma Wadkar
December 17	Nepal International: Host: Kathmandu, Nepal; Level: International Series; Prize: $8,000; Format: 64MS/32WS/32MD/16WD/32XD	Score: 21–8, 21–9	
December 17	Nepal International: Host: Kathmandu, Nepal; Level: International Series; Prize: $8,000; Format: 64MS/32WS/32MD/16WD/32XD	(India) Vighnesh Devlekar (India) Harika Veludurthi	(Nepal) Dipesh Dhami (Nepal) Shova Gauchan
December 17	Nepal International: Host: Kathmandu, Nepal; Level: International Series; Prize: $8,000; Format: 64MS/32WS/32MD/16WD/32XD	Score: 21–15, 21–7	

== See also ==
- BWF World Ranking
