= 2019 Oceania Badminton Championships =

Badminton tournament

Tournament details
- Dates: 11–14 February (Individual Events); 15–17 February (Team Events)
- Edition: XIV
- Venue: Melbourne Sports & Aquatic Centre
- Location: Melbourne, Australia

The XIV 2019 Oceania Badminton Championships was the continental badminton championships in Oceania sanctioned by Badminton Oceania, and Badminton World Federation. This championship was organized by Badminton Victoria, and was the 14th edition of the Oceania Badminton Championships. It was held in Melbourne, Australia from 11 to 14 February 2019. The individual event started on 11 February, while the team event started on 15 February.

== Venue ==
The tournament was held at the Melbourne Sports & Aquatic Centre, Melbourne, Australia.

== Medalists ==
=== Individual event ===
Event	Gold	Silver	Bronze
Men's singles	(New Zealand) Oscar Guo	(French Polynesia) Rémi Rossi	(New Zealand) Abhinav Manota
Men's singles	(New Zealand) Oscar Guo	(French Polynesia) Rémi Rossi	(Australia) Keith Mark Edison
Women's singles	(Australia) Chen Hsuan-yu	(Australia) Yingzi Jiang	(New Zealand) Sally Fu
Women's singles	(Australia) Chen Hsuan-yu	(Australia) Yingzi Jiang	(Australia) Louisa Ma
Men's doubles	(Australia) Sawan Serasinghe (Australia) Eric Vuong	(Australia) Simon Leung (Australia) Mitchell Wheller	(Australia) Lukas Defolky (Australia) Raymond Tam
Men's doubles	(Australia) Sawan Serasinghe (Australia) Eric Vuong	(Australia) Simon Leung (Australia) Mitchell Wheller	(Australia) Jacob Schueler (Australia) Felix Wang
Women's doubles	(Australia) Setyana Mapasa (Australia) Gronya Somerville	(Australia) Yingzi Jiang (Australia) Louisa Ma	(New Zealand) Erena Calder-Hawkins (New Zealand) Anona Pak
Women's doubles	(Australia) Setyana Mapasa (Australia) Gronya Somerville	(Australia) Yingzi Jiang (Australia) Louisa Ma	(Australia) Jessica Lim (Australia) Talia Saunders
Mixed doubles	(Australia) Simon Leung (Australia) Gronya Somerville	(Australia) Sawan Serasinghe (Australia) Khoo Lee Yen	(Australia) Huaidong Tang (Australia) Setyana Mapasa
Mixed doubles	(Australia) Simon Leung (Australia) Gronya Somerville	(Australia) Sawan Serasinghe (Australia) Khoo Lee Yen	(Australia) Mitchell Wheller (Australia) Jessica Lim

=== Mixed team event ===
Event	Gold	Silver	Bronze
Mixed team	Australia; Ann-Louise Slee; Anthony Joe; Ashwant Gobinathan; Chen Hsuan-yu; Eric Vuong; Gronya Somerville; Jennifer Tam; Louisa Ma; Matthew Chau; Mitchell Wheller; Setyana Mapasa; Simon Leung	New Zealand; Abhinav Manota; Alyssa Tagle; Anona Pak; Dacmen Vong; Erena Calder-Hawkins; Justine Villegas; Jonathan Curtis; Maika Philips; Oliver Leydon-Davis; Oscar Guo; Sally Fu	New Caledonia; Bryan Nicole; Cecili Moussy; Dgenyva Matauli; Glenn Gowet; Johanna Kou; Laurene Benlahoussine; Melissa Sanmoestanom; Morgan Paitio; Ronan Ho-Yagues; Ryan Nagle; Yohan De Geoffroy

=== Medal summary ===
* Host nation (Host nation (Australia))

2019 Oceania Badminton Championships medal table
Rank	NOC	Gold	Silver	Bronze	Total
1	Australia*	5	4	7	16
2	New Zealand	1	1	3	5
3	French Polynesia	0	1	0	1
4	New Caledonia	0	0	1	1
Totals (4 entries)		6	6	11	23

== Individual event ==
The individual event of the 2019 Oceania Badminton Championships was held from 11 to 14 February, at the Melbourne Sports & Aquatic Centre, in Melbourne, Australia.

=== Participants ===
- Australia (53)
- Cook Islands (1)
- Fiji (7)
- Guam (2)
- New Caledonia (11)
- New Zealand (18)
- Samoa (7)
- Tahiti (10)

=== Men's singles ===
==== Seeds ====
1. (New Zealand) Abhinav Manota (semifinals)
2. (Australia) Daniel Fan (quarterfinals)
3. (Australia) Pit Seng Low (quarterfinals)
4. (Australia) Anthony Joe (quarterfinals)
5. (French Polynesia) Rémi Rossi (final)
6. (New Zealand) Oscar Guo (champion)
7. (Australia) Peter Yan (quarterfinals)
8. (Australia) Jacob Schueler (second round)

==== Finals ====
Semifinals
1	(New Zealand) Abhinav Manota	10	18
5	(French Polynesia) Rémi Rossi	21	21
6	(New Zealand) Oscar Guo	21	22
(Australia) Keith Mark Edison	16	20

Final
5	(French Polynesia) Rémi Rossi	22	22	15
6	(New Zealand) Oscar Guo	24	20	21

==== Top half ====
===== Section 1 =====
First Round
(Australia) Teoh K C	21	21
(Samoa) A Samuelu Sue	3	6
(French Polynesia) H Tuhiri	10	19
(Australia) J Wong	21	21
(Fiji) L Jang	12	9
(Australia) M Kong	21	21
(French Polynesia) Y Lissant	7	6
(Australia) Oon H K	21	21
(Australia) C Chen	21	9	21
(New Caledonia) Y de Geoffroy	14	21	11

Second Round
1	(New Zealand) A Manota	21	21
(Australia) Teoh K C	13	8
(Australia) K Takeda	16	17
(Australia) J Wong	21	21
7	(Australia) P Yan	21	21
(Australia) M Kong	5	7
(Australia) Oon H K	24	21
(Australia) C Chen	22	17

Third Round
1	(New Zealand) A Manota	21	21
(Australia) J Wong	14	6
7	(Australia) P Yan	21	22
(Australia) Oon H K	15	20

Quarterfinals
1	(New Zealand) A Manota	21	21
7	(Australia) P Yan	14	16

===== Section 2 =====
First Round
(New Zealand) N Tagle	21	21
(Australia) D Wong	8	14
(Australia) A Wong	21	21
(Samoa) H Soo	10	3
(Australia) B Wang	21	16	16
(New Caledonia) M Paitio	16	21	21
(Australia) T M Edison	21	14	9
(New Zealand) Dax Vong	19	21	21
(Australia) N Tang	21	21
(Guam) D Yao	5	3

Second Round
3	(Australia) P S Low	19	21	21
(New Zealand) N Tagle	21	11	15
(New Caledonia) B Nicole	8	17
(Australia) A Wong	21	21
5	(French Polynesia) R Rossi	21	21
(New Caledonia) M Paitio	12	8
(New Zealand) Dax Vong	13	19
(Australia) N Tang	21	21

Third Round
3	(Australia) P S Low	21	21
(Australia) A Wong	14	11
5	(French Polynesia) R Rossi	21	21
(Australia) N Tang	13	14

Quarterfinals
3	(Australia) P S Low	10	17
5	(French Polynesia) R Rossi	21	21

==== Bottom half ====
===== Section 3 =====
First Round
(New Caledonia) R Nagle	13	14
(Australia) H Pham	21	21
(Australia) Tan K H	21	21
(French Polynesia) M Ly	10	14
(Samoa) T Fua	5	10
(Australia) Y X Lin	21	21
(Fiji) A Ali	7	15
(Australia) E Zhang	21	21
(New Caledonia) G Gowet	21	21
(Guam) J Baptista	18	8
(Australia) E Hung	21	21
(French Polynesia) T Puhetini	4	4

Second Round
(Australia) H Pham	21	21
(Australia) Tan K H	7	10
(Australia) Y X Lin	13	17
6	(New Zealand) O Guo	21	21
(Australia) E Zhang	22	21	21
(New Caledonia) G Gowet	24	15	19
(Australia) E Hung	11	9
4	(Australia) A Joe	21	21

Third Round
(Australia) H Pham	10	17
6	(New Zealand) O Guo	21	21
(Australia) E Zhang	10	11
4	(Australia) A Joe	21	21

Quarterfinals
6	(New Zealand) O Guo	21	21
4	(Australia) A Joe	16	16

===== Section 4 =====
First Round
(Fiji) L Fong	18	10
(Australia) B Ma	21	21
(French Polynesia) R Goguenheim	12	13
(New Caledonia) R Ho-Yagues	21	21
(Australia) K M Edison	21	21
(New Zealand) V Harris	19	17
(New Zealand) J Jiang	20	16
(Australia) A Belcher	22	21
(Australia) V Nguyen	21	21
(Samoa) K Simanu	5	3

Second Round
(Australia) B Ma	21	21
(New Caledonia) R Ho-Yagues	8	16
(Australia) K M Edison	21	18	21
8	(Australia) J Schueler	16	21	17
(Australia) A Belcher	21	21
(French Polynesia) T Bourgery	14	11
(Australia) V Nguyen	7	15
2	(Australia) D Fan	21	21

Third Round
(Australia) B Ma	21	16
(Australia) K M Edison	23	21
(Australia) A Belcher	10	10
2	(Australia) D Fan	21	21

Quarterfinals
(Australia) K M Edison	21	21
2	(Australia) D Fan	16	15

=== Women's singles ===
==== Seeds ====
1. (Australia) Chen Hsuan-yu (champion)
2. (Australia) Louisa Ma (semifinals)
3. (Australia) Jennifer Tam (quarterfinals)
4. (New Zealand) Sally Fu (semifinals)

==== Finals ====
Semifinals
1	(Australia) Chen Hsuan-yu	21	21
4	(New Zealand) Sally Fu	15	9
(Australia) Yingzi Jiang	21	21
2	(Australia) Louisa Ma	19	14

Final
1	(Australia) Chen Hsuan-yu	17	21	23
(Australia) Yingzi Jiang	21	16	21

==== Top half ====
===== Section 1 =====
First Round
(Fiji) A Whiteside	8	12
(Australia) Ch Lee	21	21
(Samoa) L Caffarelli	4	3
(Australia) C Lam	21	21

Second Round
1	(Australia) Chen H-y	21	21
(Australia) Ch Lee	12	9
(New Caledonia) J Kou	8	17
(Australia) C Lam	21	21

Quarterfinals
1	(Australia) Chen H-y	21	21
(Australia) C Lam	11	16

===== Section 2 =====
First Round
(Australia) M Grills	21	21
(French Polynesia) I Ateni	14	4
(New Caledonia) M Sanmoestanom	21	21	21
(Fiji) S Nadan	23	13	7

Second Round
4	(New Zealand) S Fu	21	21
(Australia) M Grills	8	11
(Australia) Ce Lee	21	21
(New Caledonia) M Sanmoestanom	11	7

Quarterfinals
4	(New Zealand) S Fu	21	21
(Australia) Ce Lee	11	13

==== Bottom half ====
===== Section 3 =====
First Round
(Samoa) F Ioane	2	4
(Australia) YZ Jiang	21	21
(Australia) L Lim	21	21
(Fiji) D Whiteside	9	4

Second Round
(Australia) YZ Jiang	21	21
(New Caledonia) C Moussy	7	4
(Australia) L Lim	15	15
3	(Australia) J Tam	21	21

Quarterfinals
(Australia) YZ Jiang	21	21
3	(Australia) J Tam	14	11

===== Section 4 =====
First Round
(New Caledonia) L Benlahoussine	8	10
(Australia) T Ho	21	21
(New Caledonia) D Matauli	21	21
(French Polynesia) E Tau	8	6

Second Round
(Australia) T Ho	21	21
(Fiji) A Yee	5	4
(New Caledonia) D Matauli	15	18
2	(Australia) L Ma	21	21

Quarterfinals
(Australia) T Ho	16	14
2	(Australia) L Ma	21	21

=== Men's doubles ===
==== Seeds ====
1. (Australia) Simon Leung / Mitchell Wheller (final)
2. (Australia) Cham Chen / Toby Wong (second round)
3. (New Zealand) Oliver Leydon-Davis / Abhinav Manota (second round)
4. (Australia) Lukas Defolky / Raymond Tam (semifinals)

==== Finals ====
Semifinals
1	(Australia) Simon Leung (Australia) Mitchell Wheller	21	17	21
4	(Australia) Lukas Defolky (Australia) Raymond Tam	17	21	16
(Australia) Sawan Serasinghe (Australia) Eric Vuong	21	21
(Australia) Jacob Schueler (Australia) Felix Wang	15	13

Final
1	(Australia) Simon Leung (Australia) Mitchell Wheller	17	10
(Australia) Sawan Serasinghe (Australia) Eric Vuong	21	21

==== Top half ====
===== Section 1 =====
First Round
(New Zealand) M Phillips (New Zealand) Dac Vong	21	21
(Australia) V Nguyen (Australia) H Pham	14	18
(Australia) Y X Lin (Australia) Teoh K C	21	21
(French Polynesia) R Goguenheim (French Polynesia) R Rossi	19	10
(Samoa) T Fua (Samoa) H Soo	13	18
(New Caledonia) G Gowet (New Caledonia) R Nagle	21	21

Second Round
1	(Australia) S Leung (Australia) M Wheller	21	21
(New Zealand) M Phillips (New Zealand) Dac Vong	8	12
(Australia) Y X Lin (Australia) Teoh K C	21	21
(New Caledonia) G Gowet (New Caledonia) R Nagle	7	10

Quarterfinals
1	(Australia) S Leung (Australia) M Wheller	21	14	23
(Australia) Y X Lin (Australia) Teoh K C	19	21	21

===== Section 2 =====
First Round
(Guam) J Baptista (Guam) D Yao	17	12
(New Caledonia) R Ho-Yagues (New Caledonia) M Paitio	21	21
(French Polynesia) T Puhetini (French Polynesia) H Tuhiri	11	9
(Australia) B Wang (Australia) E Zhang	21	21
(Australia) Tan K H (Australia) HD Tang	17	15
(New Zealand) J Boyle (New Zealand) Dax Vong	21	21

Second Round
4	(Australia) L Defolky (Australia) R Tam	21	21
(New Caledonia) R Ho-Yagues (New Caledonia) M Paitio	8	13
(Australia) B Wang (Australia) E Zhang	10	9
(New Zealand) J Boyle (New Zealand) Dax Vong	21	21

Quarterfinals
4	(Australia) L Defolky (Australia) R Tam	21	21
(New Zealand) J Boyle (New Zealand) Dax Vong	10	16

==== Bottom half ====
===== Section 3 =====
First Round
(Samoa) A Samuelu Sue (Samoa) K Simanu	11	11
(Australia) K M Edison (Australia) T M Edison	21	21
(Fiji) A Ali (Fiji) L Fong	13	12
(Australia) B Ma (Australia) A Wong	21	21
(French Polynesia) T Bourgery (French Polynesia) M Ly	5	11
(Australia) S Serasinghe (Australia) E Vuong	21	21

Second Round
(Australia) K M Edison (Australia) T M Edison	18	15
(Australia) B Ma (Australia) A Wong	21	21
(Australia) S Serasinghe (Australia) E Vuong	14	21	21
3	(New Zealand) O Leydon-Davis (New Zealand) A Manota	21	13	19

Quarterfinals
(Australia) B Ma (Australia) A Wong	11	14
(Australia) S Serasinghe (Australia) E Vuong	21	21

===== Section 4 =====
First Round
(New Zealand) V Harris (Cook Islands) A Karati	16	17
(Australia) J Schueler (Australia) F Wang	21	21
(Australia) A Belcher (Australia) K Takeda	21	21
(New Caledonia) Y de Geoffroy (New Caledonia) B Nicole	10	15
(Australia) N Tang (Australia) D Wong	17	21	18
(New Zealand) J Curtin (New Zealand) D Soedjasa	21	13	21

Second Round
(Australia) J Schueler (Australia) F Wang	21	21
(Australia) A Belcher (Australia) K Takeda	19	15
(New Zealand) J Curtin (New Zealand) D Soedjasa	21	14	21
2	(Australia) C Chen (Australia) T Wong	19	21	16

Quarterfinals
(Australia) J Schueler (Australia) F Wang	21	21
(New Zealand) J Curtin (New Zealand) D Soedjasa	18	14

=== Women's doubles ===
==== Seeds ====
1. (Australia) Setyana Mapasa / Gronya Somerville (champions)
2. (New Zealand) Sally Fu / Alyssa Tagle (quarterfinals)
3. (Australia) Yingzi Jiang / Louisa Ma (final)
4. (French Polynesia) Ingrid Ateni / Esther Tau (second round)

==== Finals ====
Semifinals
1	(Australia) Setyana Mapasa (Australia) Gronya Somerville	21	21
(New Zealand) Erena Calder-Hawkins (New Zealand) Anona Pak	12	14
3	(Australia) Yingzi Jiang (Australia) Louisa Ma	21	21	21
(Australia) Jessica Lim (Australia) Talia Saunders	23	14	18

Final
1	(Australia) Setyana Mapasa (Australia) Gronya Somerville	21	21
3	(Australia) Yingzi Jiang (Australia) Louisa Ma	10	9

==== Top half ====
===== Section 1 =====
First Round	Second Round				Quarterfinals
	1	(Australia) S Mapasa (Australia) G Somerville	21	21
		(New Caledonia) J Kou (New Caledonia) D Matauli	8	11
					1	(Australia) S Mapasa (Australia) G Somerville	21	21
						(Australia) V He (Australia) S Lim	10	10
	(Australia) V He (Australia) S Lim		21	21
	(Fiji) A Whiteside (Fiji) D Whiteside		14	6

===== Section 2 =====
First Round	Second Round				Quarterfinals
	4	(French Polynesia) I Ateni (French Polynesia) E Tau	9	10
		(Australia) Ce Lee (Australia) Ch Lee	21	21
					(Australia) Ce Lee (Australia) Ch Lee	16	13
					(New Zealand) E Calder-Hawkins (New Zealand) A Pak	21	21
	(New Zealand) E Calder-Hawkins (New Zealand) A Pak		21	21
	(Australia) M Grills (Australia) C Ho		18	16

==== Bottom half ====
===== Section 3 =====
First Round
(French Polynesia) C Bouttin (New Caledonia) M Sanmoestanom	5	18
(Australia) T Ho (Australia) J Tam	21	21

Second Round
(Australia) T Ho (Australia) J Tam	21	21
(Fiji) S Nadan (Fiji) A Yee	3	7
(New Caledonia) L Benlahoussine (New Caledonia) C Moussy	8	11
3	(Australia) YZ Jiang (Australia) L Ma	21	21

Quarterfinals
(Australia) T Ho (Australia) J Tam	21	10	14
3	(Australia) YZ Jiang (Australia) L Ma	19	21	21

===== Section 4 =====
First Round	Second Round				Quarterfinals
	(Samoa) L Caffarelli (Samoa) F Ioane		4	2
	(Australia) J Lim (Australia) T Saunders		21	21
						(Australia) J Lim (Australia) T Saunders	21	21
					2	(New Zealand) S Fu (New Zealand) A Tagle	14	18
		(Australia) C Lam (Australia) J Vega	16	13
	2	(New Zealand) S Fu (New Zealand) A Tagle	21	21

=== Mixed doubles ===
==== Seeds ====
1. (Australia) Simon Leung / Gronya Somerville (champions)
2. (New Zealand) Jonathan Curtin / Erena Calder-Hawkins (second round)
3. (Australia) Peter Yan / Talia Saunders (quarterfinals)
4. (Fiji) Ahmad Ali / Andra Whiteside (first round)
5. (Australia) Huaidong Tang / Setyana Mapasa (semifinals)
6. (Australia) Sawan Serasinghe / Lee Yen Khoo (final)
7. (New Zealand) Oliver Leydon-Davis / Anona Pak (quarterfinals)
8. (New Zealand) Maika Phillips / Alyssa Tagle (second round)

==== Finals ====
Semifinals
1	(Australia) Simon Leung (Australia) Gronya Somerville	21	21
5	(Australia) Huaidong Tang (Australia) Setyana Mapasa	12	6
(Australia) Mitchell Wheller (Australia) Jessica Lim	4	7
6	(Australia) Sawan Serasinghe (Australia) Khoo Lee Yen	21	21

Final
1	(Australia) Simon Leung (Australia) Gronya Somerville	21	21
6	(Australia) Sawan Serasinghe (Australia) Khoo Lee Yen	18	15

==== Top half ====
===== Section 1 =====
First Round
1	(Australia) S Leung (Australia) G Somerville	21	21
(French Polynesia) M Ly (French Polynesia) E Tau	7	10
(Samoa) T Fua (Samoa) F Ioane	5	4
(Australia) B Ma (Australia) J Tam	21	21
7	(New Zealand) O Leydon-Davis (New Zealand) A Pak	21	21
(New Caledonia) R Nagle (New Caledonia) M Sanmoestanom	8	7
(New Zealand) Dax Vong (New Zealand) C Lam	13	21	15
(Australia) Teoh K C (Australia) Ce Lee	21	19	21

Second Round
1	(Australia) S Leung (Australia) G Somerville	21	21
(Australia) B Ma (Australia) J Tam	10	14
7	(New Zealand) O Leydon-Davis (New Zealand) A Pak	21	21
(Australia) Teoh K C (Australia) Ce Lee	13	8

Quarterfinals
1	(Australia) S Leung (Australia) G Somerville	21	23	24
7	(New Zealand) O Leydon-Davis (New Zealand) A Pak	15	25	22

===== Section 2 =====
First Round
4	(Fiji) A Ali (Fiji) A Whiteside	17	19
(Australia) T Wong (Australia) L Ma	21	21
(Australia) F Wang (Australia) V He	21	21
(French Polynesia) R Goguenheim (French Polynesia) C Vouttin	4	12
5	(Australia) HD Tang (Australia) S Mapasa	21	21
(New Caledonia) R Ho-Yagues (New Caledonia) D Matauli	7	10
(New Zealand) J Boyle (New Zealand) R H Fong	14	22
(Cook Islands) A Karati (Australia) C Ho	21	24

Second Round
(Australia) T Wong (Australia) L Ma	21	18	18
(Australia) F Wang (Australia) V He	13	21	21
5	(Australia) HD Tang (Australia) S Mapasa	21	21
(Cook Islands) A Karati (Australia) C Ho	13	14

Quarterfinals
(Australia) F Wang (Australia) V He	10	14
5	(Australia) HD Tang (Australia) S Mapasa	21	21

==== Bottom half ====
===== Section 3 =====
First Round
(French Polynesia) T Bourgery (French Polynesia) I Ateni	8	6
(Australia) M Wheller (Australia) J Lim	21	21
(New Caledonia) M Paitio (New Caledonia) J Kou	16	12
8	(New Zealand) M Phillips (New Zealand) A Tagle	21	21
(Australia) Y X Lin (Australia) L Lim	21	21
(New Caledonia) Y de Geoffroy (New Caledonia) L Benlahoussine	8	7
(Fiji) L Jang (Fiji) A Yee	8	3
3	(Australia) P Yan (Australia) T Saunders	21	21

Second Round
(Australia) M Wheller (Australia) J Lim	21	21
8	(New Zealand) M Phillips (New Zealand) A Tagle	16	17
(Australia) Y X Lin (Australia) L Lim	21	22	13
3	(Australia) P Yan (Australia) T Saunders	19	24	21

Quarterfinals
(Australia) M Wheller (Australia) J Lim	21	21
3	(Australia) P Yan (Australia) T Saunders	11	13

===== Section 4 =====
First Round
(New Zealand) Dac Vong (New Zealand) J Villegas	21	21
(Samoa) H Soo (Samoa) L Caffarelli	4	7
(New Caledonia) B Nicole (New Caledonia) C Moussy	8	6
6	(Australia) S Serasinghe (Australia) Khoo L Y	21	21
(Fiji) L Fong (Fiji) D Whiteside	6	13
(Australia) J Schueler (Australia) J Vega	21	21
(Australia) E Zhang (Australia) S Lim	17	12
2	(New Zealand) J Curtin (New Zealand) E Calder-Hawkins	21	21

Second Round
(New Zealand) Dac Vong (New Zealand) J Villegas	17	8
6	(Australia) S Serasinghe (Australia) Khoo L Y	21	21
(Australia) J Schueler (Australia) J Vega	14	21	22
2	(New Zealand) J Curtin (New Zealand) E Calder-Hawkins	21	18	20

Quarterfinals
6	(Australia) S Serasinghe (Australia) Khoo L Y	21	25
(Australia) J Schueler (Australia) J Vega	18	23

== Team event ==
=== Teams ===
- Australia (12)
- Fiji (8)
- Guam (4)
- New Caledonia (11)
- New Zealand (11)
- Samoa (6)
- French Polynesia (9)

=== Squads ===
Nation	Australia [1]	New Zealand [2]	French Polynesia [3]	Fiji [4]	Guam	New Caledonia	Samoa
Players	Anthony Joe; Ashwant Gobinathan; Eric Vuong; Matthew Chau; Mitchell Wheller; Simon Leung Wing Hang; Ann-Louise Slee; Chen Hsuan-yu; Gronya Somerville; Jennifer Tam; Louisa Ma; Setyana Mapasa	Abhinav Manota; Dacmen Vong; Jonathan Curtin; Maika Philips; Oliver Leydon-Davis; Oscar Guo; Alyssa Tagle; Anona Pak; Erena Calder-Hawkins; Justine Villegas; Sally Fu	Léo Cucuel; Manuarii Ly; Rauhiri Goguenheim; Rémi Rossi; Tarepa Bourgery; Tepoea Puhetini; Coralie Bouttin; Ingrid Ateni; Esther Tau	Ahmad Ali; Burty James Molia; Liam Fong; Leon Jang; Andra Whiteside; Ashley Yee; Danielle Whiteside; Sristi Nadan	David Yao; Junior Baptista; Grace Cai; Sarah Cai	Bryan Nicole; Glenn Gowet; Morgan Paitio; Ronan Ho-Yagues; Ryan Nagle; Yohan de Geoffroy; Cecilia Moussy; Dgenyva Matauli; Laurene Benlahoussine; Melissa Sanoestanom; Johanna Kou	Aukuso Samuelu Sue; Hilton Soo; Kennedy Simanu; Tupu Fua; Folole Ioane; Lizzie Caffarelli

=== Seeds ===
The seeding, which is based on BWF world rankings:

1. Australia
2. New Zealand
3. French Polynesia
4. Fiji

=== Results ===
Pos	Team	Pld	W	L	MF	MA	MD	GF	GA	GD	PF	PA	PD	Pts	
1	Australia (H)	6	6	0	28	2	+26	57	5	+52	1271	615	+656	6	Gold medal
2	New Zealand	6	5	1	27	3	+24	55	8	+47	1262	623	+639	5	Silver medal
3	New Caledonia	6	4	2	17	13	+4	37	28	+9	1121	1015	+106	4	Bronze medal
4	French Polynesia	6	3	3	14	16	−2	28	34	−6	979	1042	−63	3	
5	Fiji	6	2	4	10	20	−10	21	41	−20	875	1067	−192	2	
6	Guam	6	1	5	8	22	−14	18	44	−26	793	1142	−349	1	
7	Samoa	6	0	6	1	29	−28	3	59	−56	485	1282	−797	0	

Source: TS
(H) Host
