= 2020 Oceania Badminton Championships =

Tournament details
- Dates: February 10 – February 12 (Individual event); February 13 – February 15 (Team event)
- Edition: XV
- Venue: Ken Kay Badminton Stadium
- Location: Ballarat, Australia

The 2020 Oceania Badminton Championships was the continental badminton championships in Oceania sanctioned by the Badminton Oceania, and Badminton World Federation. This championship was organized by Badminton Ballarat, and was the 15th edition of the Oceania Badminton Championships. It was held in Ballarat, Australia from 10 to 15 February 2020. The team event started in 13 February, and is the qualification stage for the 2020 Thomas & Uber Cup finals to be played in Denmark, while the individual event started in 10 February.

== Venue ==
The tournament was held at the Ken Kay Badminton Stadium, Ballarat, Australia.

== Medalists ==
=== Individual event ===
Event	Gold	Silver	Bronze
Men's singles	(New Zealand) Abhinav Manota	(New Zealand) Edward Lau	(Australia) Nathan Tang
Men's singles	(New Zealand) Abhinav Manota	(New Zealand) Edward Lau	(Australia) Milain Lohith Ranasinghe
Women's singles	(Australia) Chen Hsuan-yu	(Australia) Louisa Ma	(Australia) Sylvina Kurniawan
Women's singles	(Australia) Chen Hsuan-yu	(Australia) Louisa Ma	(Australia) Tiffany Ho
Men's doubles	(New Zealand) Oliver Leydon-Davis (New Zealand) Abhinav Manota	(Australia) Matthew Chau (Australia) Sawan Serasinghe	(Australia) Lukas Defolky (Australia) Raymond Tam
Men's doubles	(New Zealand) Oliver Leydon-Davis (New Zealand) Abhinav Manota	(Australia) Matthew Chau (Australia) Sawan Serasinghe	(Australia) Lin Ying Xiang (Australia) Teoh Kai Chen
Women's doubles	(Australia) Setyana Mapasa (Australia) Gronya Somerville	(New Zealand) Sally Fu (New Zealand) Alyssa Tagle	(Australia) Tiffany Ho (Australia) Jodee Vega
Women's doubles	(Australia) Setyana Mapasa (Australia) Gronya Somerville	(New Zealand) Sally Fu (New Zealand) Alyssa Tagle	(Australia) Majan Almazan (Australia) Kaitlyn Ea
Mixed doubles	(Australia) Simon Leung (Australia) Gronya Somerville	(Australia) Tran Hoang Pham (Australia) Sylvina Kurniawan	(Australia) Raymond Tam (Australia) Jessica Lim
Mixed doubles	(Australia) Simon Leung (Australia) Gronya Somerville	(Australia) Tran Hoang Pham (Australia) Sylvina Kurniawan	(New Zealand) Dylan Soedjasa (New Zealand) Alyssa Tagle

=== Team event ===
Event	Gold	Silver	Bronze
Men's team	Australia; Matthew Chau; Keith Mark Edison; Anthony Joe; Simon Leung; Lin Ying Xiang; Jacob Schueler; Sawan Serasinghe; Mitchell Wheller	New Zealand; Jonathan Curtin; Oscar Guo; Adam Jeffrey; Edward Lau; Oliver Leydon-Davis; Abhinav Manota; Dhanny Oud; Maika Phillips; Dylan Soedjasa; Niccolo Tagle	Tahiti; Louis Beaubois; Quentin Bernaix; Léo Cucuel; Heinoa Deane; Keivens Scilloux; Kaihei Teiefitu; Brice Vongue
Women's team	Australia; Chen Hsuan-yu; Kaitlyn Ea; Tiffany Ho; Sylvina Kurniawan; Louisa Ma; Setyana Mapasa; Gronya Somerville; Angela Yu	New Zealand; Erena Calder-Hawkins; Sally Fu; Shaunna Li; Jasmin Ng Chung Man; Anona Pak; Catelyn Rozario; Alyssa Tagle; Justine Villegas	New Caledonia; Johanna Kou; Dgenyva Matauli; Cecilia Moussy; Marine Souviat; Julie Wongsodjirono

=== Medal summary ===
* Host nation (Host nation (Australia))

2020 Oceania Badminton Championships medal table
Rank	NOC	Gold	Silver	Bronze	Total
1	Australia*	5	3	9	17
2	New Zealand	2	4	1	7
3	New Caledonia	0	0	1	1
3	Tahiti	0	0	1	1
Totals (4 entries)		7	7	12	26

== Men's singles ==
=== Seeds ===
1. (New Zealand) Abhinav Manota (champion)
2. (Australia) Anthony Joe (fourth round)
3. (Australia) Pit Seng Low (fourth round)
4. (Australia) Keith Mark Edison (second round)
5. (Australia) Jacob Schueler (quarterfinals)
6. (Australia) Peter Yan (fourth round)
7. (New Zealand) Niccolo Tagle (second round)
8. (Australia) Jack Yu (fourth round)
9. (Australia) Anthony Wong (third round)
10. (Australia) Ashwant Gobinathan (fourth round)
11. (Australia) Athi Selladurai (fourth round)
12. (Australia) Teoh Kai Chen (quarterfinals)
13. (Australia) Lin Yin Xiang (quarterfinals)
14. (New Caledonia) Ronan Ho-Yagues (third round)
15. (Australia) Oon Hoe Keat (quarterfinals)
16. (Australia) Nathan Tang (semifinals)

=== Finals ===
Quarterfinals
1	(New Zealand) Abhinav Manota	21	21
5	(Australia) Jacob Schueler	7	15
13	(Australia) Lin Ying Xiang	17	15
16	(Australia) Nathan Tang	21	21
15	(Australia) Oon Hoe Keat	13	14
(New Zealand) Edward Lau	21	21
(Australia) Milain Lohith Ranasinghe	21	21
12	(Australia) Teoh Kai Chen	16	15

Semifinals
1	(New Zealand) Abhinav Manota	21	21
16	(Australia) Nathan Tang	16	8
(New Zealand) Edward Lau	19	21	21
(Australia) Milain Lohith Ranasinghe	21	14	18

Final
1	(New Zealand) Abhinav Manota	21	21
(New Zealand) Edward Lau	17	15

=== Top half ===
==== Section 1 ====
First Round

Second Round
1	(New Zealand) A Manota	21	21
(Australia) O Zhao	10	8
(Tonga) T Ngaue	21	9	14
(Australia) Tan K H	16	21	21
10	(Australia) A Gobinathan	21	21
(French Polynesia) B Vongue	14	11
(Fiji) Qiu G J	7	9
(Australia) P Souksavat	21	21

Third Round
1	(New Zealand) A Manota	21	21
(Australia) Tan K H	4	8
10	(Australia) A Gobinathan	17	21	21
(Australia) P Souksavat	21	15	9

Fourth Round
1	(New Zealand) A Manota	21	21
10	(Australia) A Gobinathan	10	12

==== Section 2 ====
First Round

Second Round
5	(Australia) J Schueler	21	21
(New Caledonia) L Juillot	9	3
(Australia) A Sharma	11	18
(New Caledonia) Y de Geoffroy	21	21
11	(Australia) A Selladurai	21	21
(New Zealand) J Chung	4	9
(Australia) T Ng Z X	21	21
(Cook Islands) S Vakatini	5	4

Third Round
5	(Australia) J Schueler	21	21
(New Caledonia) Y de Geoffroy	5	10
11	(Australia) A Selladurai	21	21
(Australia) T Ng Z X	13	15

Fourth Round
5	(Australia) J Schueler	21	14	21
11	(Australia) A Selladurai	18	21	16

==== Section 3 ====
First Round

Second Round
3	(Australia) P S Low	21	21
(French Polynesia) Q Bernaix	8	11
(Australia) R Venpin	20	18
(New Zealand) J Virk	22	21
13	(Australia) Lin Y X	21	21
(Australia) A Cam	6	10
(Australia) B Chen E-w	21	21
(Cook Islands) A Karati	18	18

Third Round
3	(Australia) P S Low	21	21
(New Zealand) J Virk	14	10
13	(Australia) Lin Y X	21	21
(Australia) B Chen E-w	14	16

Fourth Round
3	(Australia) P S Low	10	16
13	(Australia) Lin Y X	21	21

==== Section 4 ====
First Round

Second Round
8	(Australia) J Yu	21	21
(New Caledonia) B Nicole	6	6
(French Polynesia) H Deane	10	7
(Australia) B Guo	21	21
16	(Australia) N Tang	21	21
(New Zealand) L Falvey	16	13
(Australia) Marc Kong	21	21
(Fiji) A Ali	5	6

Third Round
8	(Australia) J Yu	21	21
(Australia) B Guo	10	10
16	(Australia) N Tang	21	21
(Australia) Marc Kong	6	9

Fourth Round
8	(Australia) J Yu	17	13
16	(Australia) N Tang	21	21

=== Bottom half ===
==== Section 5 ====
First Round
(Tonga) S T Fonua	18	9
(New Zealand) R Tong	21	21

Second Round
(New Zealand) R Tong	21	15	21
(Australia) R Agustino	13	21	19
(French Polynesia) L Beaubois	12	14
15	(Australia) Oon H K	21	21
(Fiji) Kim C H	8	12
(Australia) G K Ong	21	21
(New Caledonia) L Kromopawiro	14	5
6	(Australia) P Yan	21	21

Third Round
(New Zealand) R Tong	16	15
15	(Australia) Oon H K	21	21
(Australia) G K Ong	9	13
6	(Australia) P Yan	21	21

Fourth Round
15	(Australia) Oon H K	21	21
6	(Australia) P Yan	12	8

==== Section 6 ====
First Round

Second Round
(Australia) R Tang	21	21
(Australia) D Hocking	19	8
(Australia) N Pham T Q	10	11
14	(New Caledonia) R Ho-Yagues	21	21
(Cook Islands) V Tupa	5	4
(Australia) Pham L T H	21	21
(New Zealand) E Lau	21	21
4	(Australia) K M Edison	12	19

Third Round
(Australia) R Tang	21	21
14	(New Caledonia) R Ho-Yagues	14	11
(Australia) Pham L T H	9	12
(New Zealand) E Lau	21	21

Fourth Round
(Australia) R Tang	10	9
(New Zealand) E Lau	21	21

==== Section 7 ====
First Round

Second Round
(French Polynesia) K Teiefitu	5	6
(Australia) D Han	21	21
(Cook Islands) D Daniel	4	12
9	(Australia) A Wong	21	21
(Australia) V Nguyen	21	21
(Fiji) L Fong	7	17
(Australia) M L Ranasinghe	21	21
7	(New Zealand) N Tagle	19	15

Third Round
(Australia) D Han	21	21
9	(Australia) A Wong	16	15
(Australia) V Nguyen	15	12
(Australia) M L Ranasinghe	21	21

Fourth Round
(Australia) D Han	23	13	11
(Australia) M L Ranasinghe	21	21	21

==== Section 8 ====
First Round

Second Round
(New Zealand) W Wong	24	13	18
(Australia) Matt Kong	22	21	21
(Fiji) M Feussner	5	8
12	(Australia) Teoh K C	21	21
(Australia) B Wang	13	15
(French Polynesia) K Scilloux	21	21
(Cook Islands) D Matakino	7	8
2	(Australia) A Joe	21	21

Third Round
(Australia) Matt Kong	8	9
12	(Australia) Teoh K C	21	21
(French Polynesia) K Scilloux	9	15
2	(Australia) A Joe	21	21

Fourth Round
12	(Australia) Teoh K C	11	21	21
2	(Australia) A Joe	21	17	12

== Women's singles ==
=== Seeds ===
1. (Australia) Chen Hsuan-yu (champion)
2. (Australia) Louisa Ma (final)
3. (New Zealand) Sally Fu (quarterfinals)
4. (Australia) Tiffany Ho (semifinals)
5. (Australia) Jennifer Tam (third round)
6. (Australia) Celeste Lee (third round)
7. (New Zealand) Shaunna Li (quarterfinals)
8. (French Polynesia) Esther Tau (third round)

=== Finals ===
Semifinals
1	(Australia) Chen Hsuan-yu	21	21
(Australia) Sylvina Kurniawan	11	5
4	(Australia) Tiffany Ho	17	19
2	(Australia) Louisa Ma	21	21

Final
1	(Australia) Chen Hsuan-yu	21	21
2	(Australia) Louisa Ma	15	11

=== Top half ===
==== Section 1 ====
First Round

Second Round
1	(Australia) Chen H-y	21	21
(New Caledonia) J Wongsodjirono	8	3
(Cook Islands) T Akavi	5	8
(Australia) M Wijaya	21	21
8	(French Polynesia) E Tau	21	21
(Tonga) M L Kei	19	12
(Australia) Z Fung	w	/	o
(New Zealand) R Phillips

Third Round
1	(Australia) Chen H-y	21	21
(Australia) M Wijaya	11	1
8	(French Polynesia) E Tau	7	15
(Australia) Z Fung	21	21

Quarterfinals
1	(Australia) Chen H-y	21	21
(Australia) Z Fung	14	15

==== Section 2 ====
First Round
(Australia) S Kurniawan	21	21
(Cook Islands) E Wichman	8	6

Second Round
3	(New Zealand) S Fu	21	25
(Australia) S Go	17	23
(Australia) M Almazan	17	21	21
(New Caledonia) J Kou	21	14	13
5	(Australia) J Tam	21	21
(Kiribati) T Utimawa	10	8
(French Polynesia) M Mi You	6	5
(Australia) S Kurniawan	21	21

Third Round
3	(New Zealand) S Fu	21	21
(Australia) M Almazan	12	18
5	(Australia) J Tam	6	12
(Australia) S Kurniawan	21	21

Quarterfinals
3	(New Zealand) S Fu	17	23
(Australia) S Kurniawan	21	25

=== Bottom half ===
==== Section 3 ====
First Round
(French Polynesia) N Smits	8	8
(New Caledonia) D Matauli	21	21

Second Round
(New Caledonia) D Matauli	18	21	16
(Tonga) L 'Isitolo	21	15	21
(Australia) Lee Y-b	7	16
7	(New Zealand) S Li	21	21
(Australia) C Ho	21	21
(Cook Islands) L Kureta	5	15
(New Caledonia) C Moussy	4	7
4	(Australia) T Ho	21	21

Third Round
(Tonga) L 'Isitolo	10	7
7	(New Zealand) S Li	21	21
(Australia) C Ho	9	11
4	(Australia) T Ho	21	21

Quarterfinals
7	(New Zealand) S Li	21	14	18
4	(Australia) T Ho	18	21	21

==== Section 4 ====
First Round
(New Zealand) C Rozario	23	13	22
(Australia) K Ea	21	21	20

Second Round
(New Zealand) C Rozario	21	21
(French Polynesia) M Gaillard	15	8
(Cook Islands) M Karika	9	6
6	(Australia) C Lee	21	21
(Australia) A Yu	21	21
(New Caledonia) M Souviat	2	6
(Kiribati) T Tekeiaki	9	12
2	(Australia) L Ma	21	21

Third Round
(New Zealand) C Rozario	21	21
6	(Australia) C Lee	13	18
(Australia) A Yu	10	22
2	(Australia) L Ma	21	24

Quarterfinals
(New Zealand) C Rozario	8	15
2	(Australia) L Ma	21	21

== Men's doubles ==
=== Seeds ===
1. (Australia) Simon Leung / Mitchell Wheller (quarterfinals)
2. (New Zealand) Oliver Leydon-Davis / Abhinav Manota (champions)
3. (Australia) Lin Ying Xiang / Teoh Kai Chen (semifinals)
4. (Australia) Lukas Defolky / Raymond Tam (semifinals)

=== Finals ===
Semifinals
(Australia) Matthew Chau (Australia) Sawan Serasinghe	21	21
4	(Australia) Lukas Defolky (Australia) Raymond Tam	10	17
3	(Australia) Lin Ying Xiang (Australia) Teoh Kai Chen	12	16
2	(New Zealand) Oliver Leydon-Davis (New Zealand) Abhinav Manota	21	21

Final
(Australia) Matthew Chau (Australia) Sawan Serasinghe	21	9	14
2	(New Zealand) Oliver Leydon-Davis (New Zealand) Abhinav Manota	18	21	21

=== Top half ===
==== Section 1 ====
First Round
(New Caledonia) Y de Geoffroy (New Caledonia) B Nicole	12	12
(Australia) R Tang (Australia) O Zhao	21	21
(New Zealand) D Oud (New Zealand) R Tong	21	21
(Australia) Marc Kong (Australia) B Wang	14	11
(Australia) M Chau (Australia) S Serasinghe	21	21
(Cook Islands) D Daniel (Cook Islands) V Tupa	3	6

Second Round
1	(Australia) S Leung (Australia) M Wheller	9	21	23
(Australia) R Tang (Australia) O Zhao X D	21	18	21
(New Zealand) D Oud (New Zealand) R Tong	14	15
(Australia) M Chau (Australia) S Serasinghe	21	21

Quarterfinals
1	(Australia) S Leung (Australia) M Wheller	13	15
(Australia) M Chau (Australia) S Serasinghe	21	21

==== Section 2 ====
First Round
4	(Australia) L Defolky (Australia) R Tam	21	21
(New Zealand) M Phillips (New Zealand) D Soedjasa	11	10
(Cook Islands) A Karati (Australia) Tan K H	22	15
(Australia) V Nguyen (Australia) Pham L T H	24	21
(French Polynesia) K Teiefitu (French Polynesia) B Vongue	5	8
(Australia) R Agustino (Australia) J Yu	21	21
(Australia) P Souksavat (Australia) R Venpin	21	21
(Fiji) L Fong (Fiji) Kim C H	15	8

Second Round
4	(Australia) L Defolky (Australia) R Tam	21	21
(Australia) V Nguyen (Australia) Pham L T H	13	9
(Australia) R Agustino (Australia) J Yu	22	14	21
(Australia) P Souksavat (Australia) R Venpin	20	21	18

Quarterfinals
4	(Australia) L Defolky (Australia) R Tam	21	21
(Australia) R Agustino (Australia) J Yu	15	16

=== Bottom half ===
==== Section 3 ====
First Round
(French Polynesia) L Beaubois (French Polynesia) K Scilloux	21	17	17
(Australia) B Chen E-W (Australia) G K Ong	19	21	21
(Australia) N Tang (Australia) P Yan	21	21
(Tonga) S T Fonua (Tonga) T Ngaue	10	5
(New Zealand) J Curtin (New Zealand) A Jeffrey	13	21	20
(Australia) D Hocking (Australia) M L Ranasinghe	21	18	22
(Fiji) A Ali (Fiji) M Feussner	9	14
3	(Australia) Lin Y X (Australia) Teoh K C	21	21

Second Round
(Australia) B Chen E-W (Australia) G K Ong	10	14
(Australia) N Tang (Australia) P Yan	21	21
(Australia) D Hocking (Australia) M L Ranasinghe	20	15
3	(Australia) Lin Y X (Australia) Teoh K C	22	21

Quarterfinals
(Australia) N Tang (Australia) P Yan	16	22	15
3	(Australia) Lin Y X (Australia) Teoh K C	21	20	21

==== Section 4 ====
First Round
(Cook Islands) D Matakino (Cook Islands) S Vakatini	4	10
(Australia) A Cam (Australia) A Wong	21	21
(Australia) Pham T H (Australia) Tang HD	21	21
(Fiji) J Chung (Fiji) Qiu G J	6	7
(New Caledonia) L Juillot (New Caledonia) L Kromopawiro	10	10
(Australia) C Chen (Australia) W Wong	21	21

Second Round
(Australia) A Cam (Australia) A Wong	9	13
(Australia) Pham T H (Australia) Tang HD	21	21
(Australia) C Chen (Australia) W Wong	13	8^{r}
2	(New Zealand) O Leydon-Davis (New Zealand) A Manota	21	16

Quarterfinals
(Australia) Pham T H (Australia) Tang HD	17	18
2	(New Zealand) O Leydon-Davis (New Zealand) A Manota	21	21

== Women's doubles ==
=== Seeds ===
1. (Australia) Setyana Mapasa / Gronya Somerville (champions)
2. (New Zealand) Sally Fu / Alyssa Tagle (final)
3. (Australia) Jessica Lim / Talia Saunders (withdrew)
4. (Australia) Tiffany Ho / Jodee Vega (semifinals)

=== Finals ===
Semifinals
1	(Australia) Setyana Mapasa (Australia) Gronya Somerville	21	21
4	(Australia) Tiffany Ho (Australia) Jodee Vega	10	13
(Australia) Majan Almazan (Australia) Kaitlyn Ea	18	16
2	(New Zealand) Sally Fu (New Zealand) Alyssa Tagle	21	21

Final
1	(Australia) Setyana Mapasa (Australia) Gronya Somerville	21	21
2	(New Zealand) Sally Fu (New Zealand) Alyssa Tagle	9	10

=== Top half ===
==== Section 1 ====
First Round	Second Round				Quarterfinals
	1	(Australia) S Mapasa (Australia) G Somerville	21	21
		(French Polynesia) M Gaillard (French Polynesia) E Tau	4	1
					1	(Australia) S Mapasa (Australia) G Somerville	21	21
						(New Zealand) S Li (New Zealand) A Pak	13	4
	(New Zealand) S Li (New Zealand) A Pak		21	21
	(Australia) C Ho (Australia) C Lee		18	10

==== Section 2 ====
First Round
(New Zealand) E Calder-Hawkins (New Zealand) J Ng C M	21	21
(Australia) S Go (Australia) V He	11	15

Second Round
4	(Australia) T Ho (Australia) J Vega	21	21
(New Caledonia) M Souviat (New Caledonia) J Wongsodjirono	1	9
(Cook Islands) T Akavi (Cook Islands) L Kureta	3	4
(New Zealand) E Calder-Hawkins (New Zealand) J Ng C M	21	21

Quarterfinals
4	(Australia) T Ho (Australia) J Vega	10	21	21
(New Zealand) E Calder-Hawkins (New Zealand) J Ng C M	21	17	12

=== Bottom half ===
==== Section 3 ====
First Round
(New Zealand) C Rozario (New Zealand) J Villegas	21	19	16
(Australia) M Almazan (Australia) K Ea	19	21	21

Second Round
(Australia) M Almazan (Australia) K Ea	21	21
(Tonga) M L Kei (Tonga) L 'Isitolo	3	7
(New Caledonia) J Kou (New Caledonia) D Matauli	w	/	o
3	(Australia) J Lim (Australia) T Saunders

Quarterfinals
(Australia) M Almazan (Australia) K Ea	21	21
(New Caledonia) J Kou (New Caledonia) D Matauli	15	10

==== Section 4 ====
First Round
(French Polynesia) M Mi You (French Polynesia) N Smits	19	10
(Kiribati) T Tekeiaki (Kiribati) T Utimawa	21	21

Second Round
(Kiribati) T Tekeiaki (Kiribati) T Utimawa	21	21
(Australia) Lee Y-B (Australia) M Wijaya	17	17
(Cook Islands) M Karika (Cook Islands) E Wichman	6	9
2	(New Zealand) S Fu (New Zealand) A Tagle	21	21

Quarterfinals
(Kiribati) T Tekeiaki (Kiribati) T Utimawa	10	13
2	(New Zealand) S Fu (New Zealand) A Tagle	21	21

== Mixed doubles ==
=== Seeds ===
1. (Australia) Simon Leung / Gronya Somerville (champions)
2. (New Zealand) Oliver Leydon-Davis / Anona Pak (quarterfinals)
3. (Australia) Jacob Schueler / Jodee Vega (third round)
4. (New Zealand) Dhanny Oud / Jasmin Ng Chung Man (quarterfinals)
5. (Australia) Raymond Tam / Jessica Lim (semifinals)
6. (Australia) Otto Zhao Xing De / Victoria He (third round)
7. (New Zealand) Edward Lau / Shaunna Li (quarterfinals)
8. (Australia) Dylan Soedjasa / Alyssa Tagle (semifinals)

=== Finals ===
Semifinals
1	(Australia) Simon Leung (Australia) Gronya Somerville	21	21
5	(Australia) Raymond Tam (Australia) Jessica Lim	12	14
8	(New Zealand) Dylan Soedjasa (New Zealand) Alyssa Tagle	13	12
(Australia) Tran Hoang Pham (Australia) Sylvina Kurniawan	21	21

Final
1	(Australia) Simon Leung (Australia) Gronya Somerville	21	21
(Australia) Tran Hoang Pham (Australia) Sylvina Kurniawan	12	8

=== Top half ===
==== Section 1 ====
First Round
(Cook Islands) A Karati (New Zealand) R Phillips	21	17	9
(Australia) Pham L T H (Australia) J Lai	19	21	21
(Cook Islands) S Vakatini (Cook Islands) L Kureta	8	12
(New Caledonia) B Nicole (New Caledonia) C Moussy	21	21

Second Round
1	(Australia) S Leung (Australia) G Somerville	21	14	21
(New Zealand) J Curtin (New Zealand) C Rozario	15	21	10
(French Polynesia) K Scilloux (French Polynesia) M Gaillard	18	9
(Australia) Pham L T H (Australia) J Lai	21	21
7	(New Zealand) E Lau (New Zealand) S Li	21	21
(Australia) Marc Kong (Australia) Z Fung	3	8
(Australia) Teoh K C (Australia) C Lee	21	21
(New Caledonia) B Nicole (New Caledonia) C Moussy	7	13

Third Round
1	(Australia) S Leung (Australia) G Somerville	21	21
(Australia) Pham L T H (Australia) J Lai	13	11
7	(New Zealand) E Lau (New Zealand) S Li	21	21
(Australia) Teoh K C (Australia) C Lee	14	15

Quarterfinals
1	(Australia) S Leung (Australia) G Somerville	21	21
7	(New Zealand) E Lau (New Zealand) S Li	12	18

==== Section 2 ====
First Round
(French Polynesia) Q Bernaix (French Polynesia) E Tau	15	11
(Australia) P Souksavat (Australia) S Go	21	21
(Australia) R Tang (Australia) M Almazan	16	19
(New Zealand) N Tagle (New Zealand) J Villegas	21	21

Second Round
4	(New Zealand) D Oud (New Zealand) J Ng C M	21	21
(Australia) A Selladurai (Australia) J Tam	9	9
(Cook Islands) D Matakino (Cook Islands) M Karika	5	6
(Australia) P Souksavat (Australia) S Go	21	21
5	(Australia) R Tam (Australia) J Lim	21	21
(Tonga) T Ngaue (Tonga) M L Kei	9	8
(New Caledonia) Y de Geoffroy (New Caledonia) J Kou	11	15
(New Zealand) N Tagle (New Zealand) J Villegas	21	21

Third Round
4	(New Zealand) D Oud (New Zealand) J Ng C M	21	21
(Australia) P Souksavat (Australia) S Go	17	12
5	(Australia) R Tam (Australia) J Lim	21	21
(New Zealand) N Tagle (New Zealand) J Villegas	7	18

Quarterfinals
4	(New Zealand) D Oud (New Zealand) J Ng C M	16	13
5	(Australia) R Tam (Australia) J Lim	21	21

=== Bottom half ===
==== Section 3 ====
First Round
(New Zealand) M Phillips (Australia) L Ma	21	21
(New Caledonia) L Juillot (New Caledonia) M Souviat	5	8
(Australia) J Yu (Australia) A Yu	21	21
(Cook Islands) D Daniel (Cook Islands) T Akavi	6	5

Second Round
(New Zealand) M Phillips (Australia) L Ma	21	21
(Australia) R Venpin (Australia) K Ea	18	13
(Australia) D Hocking (Australia) T Saunders
8	(New Zealand) D Soedjasa (New Zealand) A Tagle	w	/	o
(Australia) J Yu (Australia) A Yu	21	21
(French Polynesia) H Deane (French Polynesia) N Smits	7	8
(Tonga) S T Fonua (Tonga) L 'Isitolo	10	5
3	(Australia) J Schueler (Australia) J Vega	21	21

Third Round
(New Zealand) M Phillips (Australia) L Ma	21	17	17
8	(New Zealand) D Soedjasa (New Zealand) A Tagle	19	21	21
(Australia) J Yu (Australia) A Yu	21	21
3	(Australia) J Schueler (Australia) J Vega	19	15

Quarterfinals
8	(New Zealand) D Soedjasa (New Zealand) A Tagle	17	21	21
(Australia) J Yu (Australia) A Yu	21	11	15

==== Section 4 ====
First Round
(New Caledonia) R Ho-Yagues (New Caledonia) D Matauli	10	14
(Australia) T H Pham (Australia) S Kurniawan	21	21
(New Caledonia) L Kromopawiro (New Caledonia) J Wongsodjirono	18	15
(French Polynesia) B Vongue (French Polynesia) M Mi You	21	21

Second Round
(Australia) T H Pham (Australia) S Kurniawan	21	21
(French Polynesia) L Beaubois (French Polynesia) H Mara	9	4
(New Zealand) A Jeffrey (New Zealand) E Calder-Hawkins	18	21	21
6	(Australia) O Zhao (Australia) V He	21	15	23
(French Polynesia) B Vongue (French Polynesia) M Mi You	10	9
(Australia) C Chen (Australia) C Ho	21	21
(Cook Islands) V Tupa (Cook Islands) E Wichman	3	5
2	(New Zealand) O Leydon-Davis (New Zealand) A Pak	21	21

Third Round
(Australia) T H Pham (Australia) S Kurniawan	21	21
6	(Australia) O Zhao (Australia) V He	5	16
(Australia) C Chen (Australia) C Ho	10	10
2	(New Zealand) O Leydon-Davis (New Zealand) A Pak	21	21

Quarterfinals
(Australia) T H Pham (Australia) S Kurniawan	15	21	21
2	(New Zealand) O Leydon-Davis (New Zealand) A Pak	21	17	15

== Team event ==
=== Seeds ===
The seeding, which is based on BWF world rankings on 3 December 2019, for both the men's and women's competition is the same:

Men's team

Seed	Country	MS 1		MS 2		MS 3		MD 1		MD 2		Total
1	Australia	Daniel Fan	10,640	Anthony Joe	10,162	Pit Seng Low	9,040	Simon Leung	20,261	Sawan Serasinghe	8,076	58,179
1	Australia	Daniel Fan	10,640	Anthony Joe	10,162	Pit Seng Low	9,040	Mitchell Wheller	20,261	Eric Vuong	8,076	58,179
2	New Zealand	Abhinav Manota	14,975	Oscar Guo	5,473	Niccolo Tagle	2,280	Oliver Leydon-Davis	15,058	Jonathan Curtin	8,030	45,816
2	New Zealand	Abhinav Manota	14,975	Oscar Guo	5,473	Niccolo Tagle	2,280	Abhinav Manota	15,058	Dylan Soedjasa	8,030	45,816
3	Tahiti	Rémi Rossi	5,012	Manuarii Ly	362	5 players	360	Tarepa Bourgery	922	2 pairs	920	7,576
3	Tahiti	Rémi Rossi	5,012	Manuarii Ly	362	5 players	360	Manuarii Ly	922	2 pairs	920	7,576
4	New Caledonia	Ronan Ho-Yagues	1,620	Morgan Paitio	1,025	Glenn Gowet	920	Ronan Ho-Yagues	2,070	Glenn Gowet	1,520	7,155
4	New Caledonia	Ronan Ho-Yagues	1,620	Morgan Paitio	1,025	Glenn Gowet	920	Morgan Paitio	2,070	Ryan Nagle	1,520	7,155
5	Fiji	Liam Fong	616	Leon Jang	615	Ahmad Ali	360	Ahmad Ali	920	—N/a		2,511
5	Fiji	Liam Fong	616	Leon Jang	615	Ahmad Ali	360	Liam Fong	920	—N/a		2,511

Women's team

Seed	Country	WS 1		WS 2		WS 3		WD 1		WD 2		Total
1	Australia	Chen Hsuan-yu	22,679	Louisa Ma	18,056	Jiang Yingzi	7,270	Setyana Mapasa	39,403	Celeste Lee	3,670	91,078
1	Australia	Chen Hsuan-yu	22,679	Louisa Ma	18,056	Jiang Yingzi	7,270	Gronya Somerville	39,403	Chloe Lee	3,670	91,078
2	New Zealand	Sally Fu	7,297	Shaunna Li	2,130	Ella Smith	1,560	Erena Calder-Hawkins	7,460	Roanne Apalisok	4,340	22,787
2	New Zealand	Sally Fu	7,297	Shaunna Li	2,130	Ella Smith	1,560	Anona Pak	7,460	Janice Jiang	4,340	22,787
3	New Caledonia	Dgenyva Matauli	1,542	Melissa Sanmoestanom	1,520	Johanna Kou	920	Johanna Kou	951	Laurene Benlahoussine	922	5,855
3	New Caledonia	Dgenyva Matauli	1,542	Melissa Sanmoestanom	1,520	Johanna Kou	920	Dgenyva Matauli	951	Cecilia Moussy	922	5,855
4	Tahiti	Esther Tau	1,565	Ingrid Ateni	920	—N/a		Ingrid Ateni	2,210	Ingrid Ateni	2	4,697
4	Tahiti	Esther Tau	1,565	Ingrid Ateni	920	—N/a		Esther Tau	2,210	Coralie Bouttin	2	4,697

=== Men's team ===
Pos	Team	Pld	W	L	MF	MA	MD	GF	GA	GD	PF	PA	PD	Pts	Qualification
1	Australia	4	4	0	18	2	+16	36	5	+31	844	468	+376	4	Thomas Cup
2	New Zealand	4	3	1	17	3	+14	35	6	+29	845	499	+346	3	
3	Tahiti	4	2	2	10	10	0	20	22	−2	643	716	−73	2	
4	New Caledonia	4	1	3	4	16	−12	10	34	−24	609	862	−253	1	
5	Fiji	4	0	4	1	19	−18	4	38	−34	474	870	−396	0	

Source: TS
- Australia vs. Fiji

Australia
5
Ken Kay Badminton Stadium
13 February 2020, 09:00 UTC+11

Fiji
0

			1	2	3
1	(Australia) (Fiji)	Anthony Joe; Liam Fong	21; 7	21; 8
2	(Australia) (Fiji)	Keith Mark Edison; Martin Feussner	21; 5	21; 7
3	(Australia) (Fiji)	Jacob Schueler; Kim Chang Ho	21; 5	21; 8
4	(Australia) (Fiji)	Sawan Serasinghe / Mitchell Wheller; Ahmad Ali / Martin Feussner	21; 11	21; 6
5	(Australia) (Fiji)	Matthew Chau / Simon Leung; Liam Fong / Kim Chang Ho	21; 19	21; 12

- New Zealand vs. New Caledonia

New Zealand
5
Ken Kay Badminton Stadium
13 February 2020, 09:00 UTC+11

New Caledonia
0

			1	2	3
1	(New Zealand) (New Caledonia)	Oscar Guo; Ronan Ho-Yagues	21; 14	21; 13
2	(New Zealand) (New Caledonia)	Niccolo Tagle; Bryan Nicole	21; 4	21; 7
3	(New Zealand) (New Caledonia)	Edward Lau; Lillian Kromopawiro	21; 6	21; 12
4	(New Zealand) (New Caledonia)	Oliver Leydon-Davis / Abhinav Manota; Ronan Ho-Yagues / Bryan Nicole	21; 9	21; 8
5	(New Zealand) (New Caledonia)	Maika Phillips / Dylan Soedjasa; Lucas Juillot / Lillian Kromopawiro	21; 6	21; 10

- Tahiti vs. Fiji

Tahiti
5
Ken Kay Badminton Stadium
13 February 2020, 17:00 UTC+11

Fiji
0

			1	2	3
1	(French Polynesia) (Fiji)	Louis Beaubois; Liam Fong	21; 15	21; 11
2	(French Polynesia) (Fiji)	Quentin Bernaix; Kim Chang Ho	21; 4	21; 9
3	(French Polynesia) (Fiji)	Keivens Scilloux; Jared Chung	21; 2	21; 5
4	(French Polynesia) (Fiji)	Quentin Bernaix / Léo Cucuel; Liam Fong / Kim Chang Ho	21; 10	23; 21
5	(French Polynesia) (Fiji)	Louis Beaubois / Keivens Scilloux; Ahmad Ali / Martin Feussner	21; 14	21; 6

- Australia vs. New Caledonia

Australia
5
Ken Kay Badminton Stadium
13 February 2020, 17:00 UTC+11

New Caledonia
0

			1	2	3
1	(Australia) (New Caledonia)	Anthony Joe; Ronan Ho-Yagues	21; 12	21; 15
2	(Australia) (New Caledonia)	Keith Mark Edison; Bryan Nicole	21; 5	21; 8
3	(Australia) (New Caledonia)	Jacob Schueler; Lucas Juillot	21; 5	21; 8
4	(Australia) (New Caledonia)	Simon Leung / Mitchell Wheller; Ronan Ho-Yagues / Lillian Kromopawiro	21; 8	21; 7
5	(Australia) (New Caledonia)	Lin Ying Xiang / Sawan Serasinghe; Lucas Juillot / Bryan Nicole	21; 7	21; 9

- New Zealand vs. Fiji

New Zealand
5
Ken Kay Badminton Stadium
14 February 2020, 09:00 UTC+11

Fiji
0

			1	2	3
1	(New Zealand) (Fiji)	Oscar Guo; Liam Fong	21; 11	21; 13
2	(New Zealand) (Fiji)	Niccolo Tagle; Martin Feussner	21; 6	21; 11
3	(New Zealand) (Fiji)	Edward Lau; Kim Chang Ho	21; 11	21; 10
4	(New Zealand) (Fiji)	Maika Phillips / Dylan Soedjasa; Ahmad Ali / Jared Chung	21; 5	21; 3
5	(New Zealand) (Fiji)	Oliver Leydon-Davis / Abhinav Manota; Liam Fong / Kim Chang Ho	21; 13	21; 9

- Australia vs. Tahiti

Australia
5
Ken Kay Badminton Stadium
14 February 2020, 09:00 UTC+11

Tahiti
0

			1	2	3
1	(Australia) (French Polynesia)	Anthony Joe; Louis Beaubois	21; 9	21; 7
2	(Australia) (French Polynesia)	Keith Mark Edison; Kaihei Teiefitu	21; 9	21; 9
3	(Australia) (French Polynesia)	Jacob Schueler; Heinoa Deane	21; 4	21; 6
4	(Australia) (French Polynesia)	Simon Leung / Mitchell Wheller; Quentin Bernaix / Keivens Scilloux	21; 8	21; 9
5	(Australia) (French Polynesia)	Lin Ying Xiang / Sawan Serasinghe; Kaihei Teiefitu / Brice Vongue	21; 11	21; 10

- New Caledonia vs. Fiji

New Caledonia
4
Ken Kay Badminton Stadium
14 February 2020, 17:00 UTC+11

Fiji
1

			1	2	3
1	(New Caledonia) (Fiji)	Ronan Ho-Yagues; Liam Fong	19; 21	21; 18	21; 14
2	(New Caledonia) (Fiji)	Yohan de Geoffroy; Ahmad Ali	21; 13	21; 8
3	(New Caledonia) (Fiji)	Bryan Nicole; Kim Chang Ho	21; 13	19; 21	21; 17
4	(New Caledonia) (Fiji)	Yohan de Geoffroy / Ronan Ho-Yagues; Ahmad Ali / Martin Feussner	21; 11	21; 19
5	(New Caledonia) (Fiji)	Lucas Juillot / Bryan Nicole; Liam Fong / Kim Chang Ho	18; 21	14; 21

- New Zealand vs. Tahiti

New Zealand
5
Ken Kay Badminton Stadium
14 February 2020, 17:00 UTC+11

Tahiti
0

			1	2	3
1	(New Zealand) (French Polynesia)	Abhinav Manota; Keivens Scilloux	21; 7	21; 9
2	(New Zealand) (French Polynesia)	Oscar Guo; Heinoa Deane	21; 7	21; 9
3	(New Zealand) (French Polynesia)	Niccolo Tagle; Brice Vongue	21; 4	21; 13
4	(New Zealand) (French Polynesia)	Maika Phillips / Dylan Soedjasa; Louis Beaubois / Quentin Bernaix	21; 16	22; 20
5	(New Zealand) (French Polynesia)	Oliver Leydon-Davis / Niccolo Tagle; Kaihei Teiefitu / Brice Vongue	21; 10	21; 9

- Australia vs. New Zealand

Australia
3
Ken Kay Badminton Stadium
15 February 2020, 09:00 UTC+11

New Zealand
2

			1	2	3
1	(Australia) (New Zealand)	Anthony Joe; Abhinav Manota	26; 28	16; 21
2	(Australia) (New Zealand)	Jacob Schueler; Oscar Guo	21; 18	16; 21	21; 14
3	(Australia) (New Zealand)	Lin Ying Xiang; Edward Lau	21; 19	23; 21
4	(Australia) (New Zealand)	Matthew Chau / Mitchell Wheller; Maika Phillips / Dylan Soedjasa	21; 17	21; 13
5	(Australia) (New Zealand)	Simon Leung / Sawan Serasinghe; Oliver Leydon-Davis / Abhinav Manota	15; 21	13; 21

- Tahiti vs. New Caledonia

Tahiti
5
Ken Kay Badminton Stadium
15 February 2020, 09:00 UTC+11

New Caledonia
0

			1	2	3
1	(French Polynesia) (New Caledonia)	Louis Beaubois; Ronan Ho-Yagues	19; 21	21; 12	21; 9
2	(French Polynesia) (New Caledonia)	Quentin Bernaix; Yohan de Geoffroy	21; 14	21; 18
3	(French Polynesia) (New Caledonia)	Keivens Scilloux; Bryan Nicole	21; 13	21; 17
4	(French Polynesia) (New Caledonia)	Louis Beaubois / Keivens Scilloux; Yohan de Geoffroy / Ronan Ho-Yagues	15; 21	22; 20	21; 19
5	(French Polynesia) (New Caledonia)	Quentin Bernaix / Léo Cucuel; Lucas Juillot / Bryan Nicole	21; 16	21; 18

=== Women's team ===
Pos	Team	Pld	W	L	MF	MA	MD	GF	GA	GD	PF	PA	PD	Pts	Qualification
1	Australia	3	3	0	14	1	+13	28	3	+25	651	319	+332	3	Uber Cup
2	New Zealand	3	2	1	11	4	+7	23	8	+15	625	400	+225	2	
3	New Caledonia	3	1	2	5	10	−5	10	21	−11	377	592	−215	1	
4	Tahiti	3	0	3	0	15	−15	1	30	−29	304	646	−342	0	

Source: TS
- Australia vs. Tahiti

Australia
5
Ken Kay Badminton Stadium
13 February 2020, 13:00 UTC+11

Tahiti
0

			1	2	3
1	(Australia) (French Polynesia)	Chen Hsuan-yu; Esther Tau	21; 3	21; 6
2	(Australia) (French Polynesia)	Angela Yu; Méiissa Mi You	21; 4	21; 6
3	(Australia) (French Polynesia)	Kaitlyn Ea; Jenica Lesourd	21; 9	21; 7
4	(Australia) (French Polynesia)	Gronya Somerville / Angela Yu; Méiissa Mi You / Nina Smits	21; 6	21; 1
5	(Australia) (French Polynesia)	Kaitlyn Ea / Setyana Mapasa; Maeva Gaillard / Hinahere Mara	21; 3	21; 3

- New Zealand vs. New Caledonia

New Zealand
5
Ken Kay Badminton Stadium
13 February 2020, 13:00 UTC+11

New Caledonia
0

			1	2	3
1	(New Zealand) (New Caledonia)	Sally Fu; Dgenyva Matauli	21; 9	21; 12
2	(New Zealand) (New Caledonia)	Shaunna Li; Johanna Kou	21; 6	21; 8
3	(New Zealand) (New Caledonia)	Catelyn Rozario; Marine Souviat	21; 3	21; 8
4	(New Zealand) (New Caledonia)	Erena Calder-Hawkins / Alyssa Tagle; Dgenyva Matauli / Julie Wongsodjirono	21; 8	21; 11
5	(New Zealand) (New Caledonia)	Shaunna Li / Anona Pak; Johanna Kou / Cecilia Moussy	21; 7	21; 13

- Australia vs. New Caledonia

Australia
5
Ken Kay Badminton Stadium
14 February 2020, 13:00 UTC+11

New Caledonia
0

			1	2	3
1	(Australia) (New Caledonia)	Chen Hsuan-yu; Dgenyva Matauli	21; 7	21; 6
2	(Australia) (New Caledonia)	Louisa Ma; Johanna Kou	21; 7	21; 12
3	(Australia) (New Caledonia)	Tiffany Ho; Marine Souviat	21; 5	21; 1
4	(Australia) (New Caledonia)	Kaitlyn Ea / Sylvina Kurniawan; Dgenyva Matauli / Julie Wongsodjirono	21; 8	21; 6
5	(Australia) (New Caledonia)	Setyana Mapasa / Gronya Somerville; Johanna Kou / Cecilia Moussy	21; 7	21; 7

- New Zealand vs. Tahiti

New Zealand
5
Ken Kay Badminton Stadium
14 February 2020, 13:00 UTC+11

Tahiti
0

			1	2	3
1	(New Zealand) (French Polynesia)	Sally Fu; Méiissa Mi You	21; 7	21; 11
2	(New Zealand) (French Polynesia)	Shaunna Li; Jenica Lesourd	21; 6	21; 15
3	(New Zealand) (French Polynesia)	Catelyn Rozario; Maeva Gaillard	21; 9	21; 16
4	(New Zealand) (French Polynesia)	Erena Calder-Hawkins / Alyssa Tagle; Hinahere Mara / Nina Smits	21; 3	21; 8
5	(New Zealand) (French Polynesia)	Sally Fu / Anona Pak; Méiissa Mi You / Esther Tau	21; 3	21; 6

- New Caledonia vs. Tahiti

New Caledonia
5
Ken Kay Badminton Stadium
15 February 2020, 13:00 UTC+11

Tahiti
0

			1	2	3
1	(New Caledonia) (French Polynesia)	Dgenyva Matauli; Esther Tau	21; 9	21; 16
2	(New Caledonia) (French Polynesia)	Johanna Kou; Méiissa Mi You	21; 16	21; 17
3	(New Caledonia) (French Polynesia)	Cecilia Moussy; Jenica Lesourd	21; 16	21; 13
4	(New Caledonia) (French Polynesia)	Dgenyva Matauli / Julie Wongsodjirono; Méiissa Mi You / Nina Smits	23; 21	14; 21	21; 19
5	(New Caledonia) (French Polynesia)	Johanna Kou / Cecilia Moussy; Maeva Gaillard / Esther Tau	21; 15	21; 9

- Australia vs. New Zealand

Australia
4
Ken Kay Badminton Stadium
15 February 2020, 13:00 UTC+11

New Zealand
1

			1	2	3
1	(Australia) (New Zealand)	Chen Hsuan-yu; Sally Fu	26; 24	28; 26
2	(Australia) (New Zealand)	Louisa Ma; Shaunna Li	13; 21	22; 20	21; 15
3	(Australia) (New Zealand)	Tiffany Ho; Catelyn Rozario	18; 21	19; 21
4	(Australia) (New Zealand)	Sylvina Kurniawan / Setyana Mapasa; Erena Calder-Hawkins / Anona Pak	21; 11	21; 14
5	(Australia) (New Zealand)	Gronya Somerville / Angela Yu; Sally Fu / Alyssa Tagle	21; 15	21; 17
