= Anthony Joe =

Australian badminton player (born 1996)

Personal information
- Born: 2 April 1996 (age 30) Canberra, Australia
- Height: 1.74 m (5 ft 9 in)
- Weight: 70 kg (154 lb)

Sport
- Country: Australia
- Sport: Badminton
- Handedness: Left

Men's singles & doubles
- Highest ranking: 116 (MS 8 February 2018); 84 (MD 1 September 2016); 123 (XD 17 November 2016)
- BWF profile
Medal record
Men's badminton
Representing Australia
Oceania Championships
Silver medal – second place	2016 Papeete	Mixed doubles
Bronze medal – third place	2015 North Harbour	Men's doubles
Bronze medal – third place	2016 Papeete	Men's singles
Bronze medal – third place	2016 Papeete	Men's doubles
Oceania Mixed Team Championships
Gold medal – first place	2016 Auckland	Mixed team
Gold medal – first place	2019 Melbourne	Mixed team
Oceania Men's Team Championships
Gold medal – first place	2018 Hamilton	Men's team
Gold medal – first place	2020 Ballarat	Men's team
Silver medal – second place	2016 Auckland	Men's team

Anthony Joe (born 2 April 1996) is an Australian badminton player. In 2016, he won the silver medal at the Oceania Championships in the mixed doubles event partnered with Joy Lai. He also won the bronze medals in the men's singles and doubles event. Joe was awarded a full blue award by the Australian National University, for his excellence and contribution to sport & recreation during the 2016 calendar year.

== Achievements ==
=== Oceania Championships ===
Men's singles
Year	Venue	Opponent	Score	Result
2016	Punaauia University Hall; Papeete, Tahiti	(French Polynesia) Rémi Rossi	21–13, 17–21, 19–21	Bronze

Men's doubles
Year	Venue	Partner	Opponent	Score	Result
2015	X-TRM North Harbour Badminton Centre; Auckland, New Zealand	(Australia) Pit Seng Low	(New Zealand) Kevin James Dennerly-Minturn (New Zealand) Oliver Leydon-Davis	15–21, 13–21	Bronze
2016	Punaauia University Hall; Papeete, Tahiti	(Australia) Pit Seng Low	(French Polynesia) Léo Cucuel (French Polynesia) Rémi Rossi	16–21, 17–21	Bronze

Mixed doubles
Year	Venue	Partner	Opponent	Score	Result
2016	Punaauia University Hall; Papeete, Tahiti	(Australia) Joy Lai	(Australia) Robin Middleton (Australia) Leanne Choo	11–21, 9–21	Silver

=== BWF International Challenge/Series ===
Men's doubles
Year	Tournament	Partner	Opponent	Score	Result
2015	New Caledonia International	(Australia) Pit Seng Low	(New Zealand) Maoni Hu He (New Zealand) Shane Masinipeni	21–15, 21–12	(gold) Winner

BWF International Challenge tournament
BWF International Series tournament
BWF Future Series tournament
