= 2018 Oceania Badminton Championships =

Tournament details
- Dates: 6–11 February
- Edition: XIII
- Venue: Eastlink Badminton Stadium
- Location: Hamilton, New Zealand

The XIII 2018 Oceania Badminton Championships was the continental badminton championships in Oceania sanctioned by the Badminton Oceania, and Badminton World Federation. This championship was organized by Badminton New Zealand, and was the 13th edition of the Oceania Badminton Championships. It was held in Hamilton, New Zealand from 6 to 11 February 2018. The team event started on 6 February, and was the qualification stage for the 2018 Thomas & Uber Cup finals in Thailand, while the individual event will start on February 8.

== Venue ==
The tournament was held at the Eastlink Badminton Stadium, Hamilton East, Hamilton, New Zealand.

== Medalists ==
=== Individual event ===
Event	Gold	Silver	Bronze
Men's singles	(New Zealand) Abhinav Manota	(French Polynesia) Rémi Rossi	(Australia) Peter Yan
Men's singles	(New Zealand) Abhinav Manota	(French Polynesia) Rémi Rossi	(New Zealand) Oscar Guo
Women's singles	(Australia) Wendy Chen Hsuan-yu	(Australia) Louisa Ma	(Australia) Joy Lai
Women's singles	(Australia) Wendy Chen Hsuan-yu	(Australia) Louisa Ma	(Australia) Zecily Fung
Men's doubles	(Australia) Matthew Chau (Australia) Sawan Serasinghe	(Australia) Robin Middleton (Australia) Ross Smith	(New Zealand) Oscar Guo (New Zealand) Dacmen Vong
Men's doubles	(Australia) Matthew Chau (Australia) Sawan Serasinghe	(Australia) Robin Middleton (Australia) Ross Smith	(Australia) Simon Leung (Australia) Mitchell Wheller
Women's doubles	(Australia) Setyana Mapasa (Australia) Gronya Somerville	(Australia) Leanne Choo (Australia) Renuga Veeran	(New Zealand) Anona Pak (New Zealand) Danielle Tahuri
Women's doubles	(Australia) Setyana Mapasa (Australia) Gronya Somerville	(Australia) Leanne Choo (Australia) Renuga Veeran	(New Zealand) Sally Fu (New Zealand) Alyssa Tagle
Mixed doubles	(Australia) Sawan Serasinghe (Australia) Setyana Mapasa	(Australia) Matthew Chau (Australia) Leanne Choo	(New Zealand) Oliver Leydon-Davis (New Zealand) Susannah Leydon-Davis
Mixed doubles	(Australia) Sawan Serasinghe (Australia) Setyana Mapasa	(Australia) Matthew Chau (Australia) Leanne Choo	(New Zealand) Niccolo Tagle (New Zealand) Alyssa Tagle

=== Team event ===
Event	Gold	Silver	Bronze
Men's team	Australia; Anthony Joe; Ashwant Gobinathan; Eric Vuong; Jacob Schueler; Matthew Chau; Pit Seng Low; Raymond Tam; Robin Middleton; Ross Smith; Sawan Serasinghe	New Zealand; Abhinav Manota; Dhanny Oud; Jonathan Curtin; Kevin Dennerly-Minturn; Maika Philips; Michael Fowke; Oliver Leydon-Davis; Oscar Guo	Tahiti; Greig Teriitanoa; Heinoa Deane; Léo Cucuel; Louis Beaubois; Quentin Bernaix; Rauhiri Goguenheim; Rémi Rossi; Steven Lesourd; Tarepa Bourgery; Teiva Politi
Women's team	Australia; Gronya Somerville; Chen Hsuan-yu; Jennifer Tam; Joy Lai; Leanne Choo; Louisa Ma; Setyana Mapasa	New Zealand; Anona Pak; Danielle Tahuri; Erena Calder-Hawkins; Gaea Galvez; Jasmin Chung Man Ng; Justine Villegas; Sally Fu; Susannah Leydon-Davis	Fiji; Alissa Dean; Andra Whiteside; Carline Bentley; Chloe Kumar; Danielle Whiteside; Karyn Gibson

== Individual event ==
The individual event of the 2018 Oceania Badminton Championships were held from 8 to 11 February, at the Eastlink Badminton Stadium, in Hamilton, Waikato, New Zealand. Australia had secured four titles in the women's singles and three doubles event, with Sawan Serasinghe and Setyana Mapasa winning two doubles titles each, and the men's singles title goes to New Zealand.

The three doubles event present all the Australian pair. Serasinghe who was teamed-up with Matthew Chau beat their compatriot Robin Middleton and Ross Smith in the final with the score 21–17, 23–21. Mapasa claimed the women's doubles title after beat Renuga Veeran and Leanne Choo with the score 21–14, 22–20. In the mixed doubles event Mapasa and Serasinghe again became the champion defeat Chau and Choo 21–19, 21–18. The women's singles final also present the Australian players, and Wendy Chen claimed the title after beat Louisa Ma 21–7, 21–14. Abhinav Manota of New Zealand broke the Australian stranglehold on the Oceania championships by winning the men's singles gold medal. Manota beat Remi Rossi of Tahiti in the straight games 21–12, 21–14 in the final.

=== Men's singles ===
==== Seeds ====
1. (Australia) Anthony Joe
2. (Australia) Pit Seng Low
3. (Australia) Ashwant Gobinathan
4. (Australia) Jacob Schueler
5. (New Zealand) Dylan Soedjasa
6. (Australia) Daniel Fan
7. (New Zealand) Niccolo Tagle
8. (Australia) Nathan Tang

==== Finals ====
Quarterfinals
(French Polynesia) Rémi Rossi	21	21
5	(New Zealand) Dylan Soedjasa	7	12
(Australia) Peter Yan	22	13	24
(Australia) Wesley Caulkett	20	21	22
6	(Australia) Daniel Fan	16	21	8
(New Zealand) Oscar Guo	21	16	21
(Australia) Kai Chen Teoh	16	14
(New Zealand) Abhinav Manota	21	21

Semifinals
(French Polynesia) Rémi Rossi	21	17	21
(Australia) Peter Yan	6	21	12
(New Zealand) Oscar Guo	22	16	17
(New Zealand) Abhinav Manota	20	21	21

Final
(French Polynesia) Rémi Rossi	12	14
(New Zealand) Abhinav Manota	21	21

=== Women's singles ===
==== Seeds ====
1. (Australia) Wendy Chen Hsuan-yu
2. (Australia) Jennifer Tam
3. (Australia) Joy Lai
4. (Australia) Louisa Ma

==== Finals ====
Semifinals
1	(Australia) Wendy Chen Hsuan-yu	w	/	o
3	(Australia) Joy Lai
4	(Australia) Louisa Ma	21	21
(Australia) Zecily Fung	18	12

Final
1	(Australia) Wendy Chen Hsuan-yu	21	21
4	(Australia) Louisa Ma	7	14

=== Men's doubles ===
==== Seeds ====
1. (Australia) Matthew Chau / Sawan Serasinghe
2. (Australia) Simon Leung / Mitchell Wheller
3. (New Zealand) Jonathan Curtin / Dhanny Oud
4. (New Zealand) Oscar Guo / Dacmen Vong

==== Finals ====
Semifinals
1	(Australia) Matthew Chau (Australia) Sawan Serasinghe	21	21
4	(New Zealand) Oscar Guo (New Zealand) Dacmen Vong	19	16
(Australia) Robin Middleton (Australia) Ross Smith	20	21	21
2	(Australia) Simon Leung (Australia) Mitchell Wheller	22	15	18

Final
1	(Australia) Matthew Chau (Australia) Sawan Serasinghe	21	23
(Australia) Robin Middleton (Australia) Ross Smith	17	21

=== Women's doubles ===
==== Seeds ====
1. (Australia) Setyana Mapasa / Gronya Somerville
2. (New Zealand) Jasmin Chung Man Ng / Erena Calder-Hawkins
3. (Australia) Leanne Choo / Renuga Veeran
4. (Guam) Grace Cai / Sarah Cai

==== Finals ====
Semifinals
1	(Australia) Setyana Mapasa (Australia) Gronya Somerville	21	18	21
(New Zealand) Anona Pak (New Zealand) Danielle Tahuri	9	21	10
3	(Australia) Leanne Choo (Australia) Renuga Veeran	21	21
(New Zealand) Sally Fu (New Zealand) Alyssa Tagle	7	4

Final
1	(Australia) Setyana Mapasa (Australia) Gronya Somerville	21	22
3	(Australia) Leanne Choo (Australia) Renuga Veeran	14	20

=== Mixed doubles ===
==== Seeds ====
1. (Australia) Sawan Serasinghe / Setyana Mapasa
2. (New Zealand) Dhanny Oud / Jasmin Chung Man Ng
3. (New Zealand) Oliver Leydon-Davis / Susannah Leydon-Davis
4. (Australia) Anthony Joe / Joy Lai

==== Finals ====
Semifinals
1	(Australia) Sawan Serasinghe (Australia) Setyana Mapasa	21	21
3	(New Zealand) Oliver Leydon-Davis (New Zealand) Susannah Leydon-Davis	12	19
(New Zealand) Niccolo Tagle (New Zealand) Alyssa Tagle	5	9
(Australia) Matthew Chau (Australia) Leanne Choo	21	21

Final
1	(Australia) Sawan Serasinghe (Australia) Setyana Mapasa	21	21
(Australia) Matthew Chau (Australia) Leanne Choo	19	18

== Team event ==
The 2018 Oceania Team Championships officially crowns the best male and female national teams in Oceania and at the same time works as the qualification event towards the 2018 Thomas & Uber Cup finals. 4 teams both in the men's and women's team have entered the tournament. Australia men's and women's team were clinched the Oceania Team titles, and qualified for the 2018 Thomas & Uber Cup finals, after topping the standings both in the men's and women's team. New Zealand men's and women's team were placing second both in the men's and women's team, while Tahiti men's team and Fiji women's team were in the third place.

=== Seeds ===
The seeding, which is based on BWF world rankings, for both the men's and women's competition is the same:

1. Australia
2. New Zealand
3. Fiji
4. Tahiti

=== Men's team ===
Pos	Team	Pld	W	L	MF	MA	MD	GF	GA	GD	PF	PA	PD	Pts	Qualification
1	Australia	3	3	0	12	3	+9	25	7	+18	612	430	+182	3	Thomas Cup
2	New Zealand	3	2	1	11	4	+7	24	9	+15	651	412	+239	2	
3	Tahiti	3	1	2	6	9	−3	12	20	−8	491	608	−117	1	
4	Fiji	3	0	3	1	14	−13	3	28	−25	346	650	−304	0	

Source: TS

All times are New Zealand Standard Time (UTC+12:00).

- Australia vs. Tahiti

Australia
4
Eastlink Badminton Stadium, WBA-7
6 February 2018 12:00

Tahiti
1

			1	2	3
1	(Australia) (French Polynesia)	Anthony Joe; Louis Beaubois	21; 6	21; 9
2	(Australia) (French Polynesia)	Matthew Chau / Sawan Serasinghe; Tarepa Bourgery / Greig Teriitanoa	21; 5	21; 10
3	(Australia) (French Polynesia)	Pit Seng Low; Rémi Rossi	18; 21	17; 21
4	(Australia) (French Polynesia)	Raymond Tam / Eric Vuong; Louis Beaubois / Rauhiri Goguenheim	21; 11	21; 7
5	(Australia) (French Polynesia)	Ashwant Gobinathan; Quentin Bernaix	21; 18	22; 20

- New Zealand vs. Fiji

New Zealand
5
Eastlink Badminton Stadium, WBA-9
6 February 2018 12:00

Fiji
0

			1	2	3
1	(New Zealand) (Fiji)	Abhinav Manota; Liam Fong	21; 4	21; 3
2	(New Zealand) (Fiji)	Jonathan Curtin; Burty James Molia	21; 14	21; 11
3	(New Zealand) (Fiji)	Kevin Dennerly-Minturn / Oliver Leydon-Davis; Ahmad Ali / Leon Jang	21; 8	21; 6
4	(New Zealand) (Fiji)	Michael Fowke; Maxie Andrew Wong	21; 5	21; 2
5	(New Zealand) (Fiji)	Jonathan Curtin / Dhanny Oud; Liam Fong / Burty James Molia	21; 15	21; 13

- New Zealand vs. Tahiti

New Zealand
4
Eastlink Badminton Stadium, WBA-7
6 February 2018 18:00

Tahiti
1

			1	2	3
1	(New Zealand) (French Polynesia)	Oscar Guo; Louis Beaubois	21; 9	21; 8
2	(New Zealand) (French Polynesia)	Michael Fowke; Rémi Rossi	17; 21	21; 15	20; 22
3	(New Zealand) (French Polynesia)	Oliver Leydon-Davis; Quentin Bernaix	21; 11	21; 10
4	(New Zealand) (French Polynesia)	Oscar Guo / Maika Phillips; Rauhiri Goguenheim / Rémi Rossi	21; 12	21; 13
5	(New Zealand) (French Polynesia)	Kevin Dennerly-Minturn / Oliver Leydon-Davis; Steven Lesourd / Greig Teritanoa	21; 11	21; 1

- Australia vs. Fiji

Australia
5
Eastlink Badminton Stadium, WBA-9
6 February 2018 18:00

Fiji
0

			1	2	3
1	(Australia) (Fiji)	Pit Seng Low; Ahmad Ali	21; 8	21; 9
2	(Australia) (Fiji)	Robin Middleton / Ross Smith; Liam Fong / Leon Jang	21; 11	21; 14
3	(Australia) (Fiji)	Ashwant Gobinathan; Maxie Andrew Wong	21; 3	21; 8
4	(Australia) (Fiji)	Raymond Tam / Eric Vuong; Ahmad Ali / Burty James Molia	21; 12	21; 15
5	(Australia) (Fiji)	Jacob Schueler; Chang Ho Kim	21; 3	21; 4

- Australia vs. New Zealand

Australia
3
Eastlink Badminton Stadium, WBA-7
7 February 2018 18:00

New Zealand
2

			1	2	3
1	(Australia) (New Zealand)	Anthony Joe; Abhinav Manota	3; 21	17; 21
2	(Australia) (New Zealand)	Pit Seng Low; Oscar Guo	7; 21	21; 16	7; 21
3	(Australia) (New Zealand)	Robin Middleton / Ross Smith; Kevin Dennerly-Minturn / Oliver Leydon-Davis	16; 21	21; 15	21; 12
4	(Australia) (New Zealand)	Matthew Chau / Sawan Serasinghe; Abhinav Manota / Maika Phillips	21; 16	21; 13
5	(Australia) (New Zealand)	Ashwant Gobinathan; Michael Fowke	21; 18	22; 20

- Fiji vs. Tahiti

Fiji
1
Eastlink Badminton Stadium, WBA-9
7 February 2018 18:00

Tahiti
4

			1	2	3
1	(Fiji) (French Polynesia)	Liam Fong; Louis Beaubois	21; 16	21; 18
2	(Fiji) (French Polynesia)	Burty James Molia; Rémi Rossi	11; 21	11; 21
3	(Fiji) (French Polynesia)	Leon Jang; Quentin Bernaix	8; 21	9; 21
4	(Fiji) (French Polynesia)	Ahmad Ali / Burty James Molia; Tarepa Bourgery / Greig Teriitanoa	25; 23	24; 26	18; 21
5	(Fiji) (French Polynesia)	Liam Fong / Leon Jang; Leo Cucuel / Rauhiri Goguenheim	13; 21	17; 21

=== Women's team ===
Pos	Team	Pld	W	L	MF	MA	MD	GF	GA	GD	PF	PA	PD	Pts	Qualification
1	Australia	3	3	0	13	2	+11	28	4	+24	662	306	+356	3	Uber Cup
2	New Zealand	3	2	1	12	3	+9	24	8	+16	606	391	+215	2	
3	Fiji	3	1	2	5	10	−5	10	20	−10	388	520	−132	1	
4	Tahiti	3	0	3	0	15	−15	0	30	−30	191	630	−439	0	

Source: TS

All times are New Zealand Standard Time (UTC+12:00).

- Australia vs. Tahiti

Australia
5
Eastlink Badminton Stadium, WBA-7
6 February 2018 09:00

Tahiti
0

			1	2	3
1	(Australia) (French Polynesia)	Jennifer Tam; Esther Tau	21; 2	21; 2
2	(Australia) (French Polynesia)	Joy Lai; Estelle Colombies	21; 9	21; 6
3	(Australia) (French Polynesia)	Louisa Ma; Méissa Mi You	21; 5	21; 2
4	(Australia) (French Polynesia)	Setyana Mapasa / Gronya Somerville; Ingrid Ateni / Estelle Colombies	21; 6	21; 5
5	(Australia) (French Polynesia)	Leanne Choo / Louisa Ma; Karine Desfour / Nina Smits	21; 2	21; 4

- New Zealand vs. Fiji

New Zealand
5
Eastlink Badminton Stadium, WBA-9
6 February 2018 09:00

Fiji
0

			1	2	3
1	(New Zealand) (Fiji)	Sally Fu; Danielle Whiteside	21; 12	21; 4
2	(New Zealand) (Fiji)	Gaea Galvez; Karyn Gibson	21; 8	21; 16
3	(New Zealand) (Fiji)	Justine Villegas; Carline Bentley	21; 6	21; 14
4	(New Zealand) (Fiji)	Anona Pak / Danielle Tahuri; Karyn Gibson / Andra Whiteside	21; 18	21; 7
5	(New Zealand) (Fiji)	Erena Calder-Hawkins / Jasmin Chung Man Ng; Carline Bentley / Alissa Dean	21; 9	21; 7

- New Zealand vs. Tahiti

New Zealand
5
Eastlink Badminton Stadium, WBA-7
6 February 2018 15:00

Tahiti
0

			1	2	3
1	(New Zealand) (French Polynesia)	Sally Fu; Ingrid Ateni	21; 5	21; 5
2	(New Zealand) (French Polynesia)	Gaea Galvez; Esther Tau	21; 1	21; 8
3	(New Zealand) (French Polynesia)	Justine Villegas; Estelle Colombies	21; 7	21; 5
4	(New Zealand) (French Polynesia)	Sally Fu / Susannah Leydon-Davis; Méissa Mi You / Nina Smits	21; 5	21; 3
5	(New Zealand) (French Polynesia)	Anona Pak / Danielle Tahuri; Estelle Colombies / Esther Tau	21; 1	21; 8

- Australia vs. Fiji

Australia
5
Eastlink Badminton Stadium, WBA-9
6 February 2018 15:00

Fiji
0

			1	2	3
1	(Australia) (Fiji)	Jennifer Tam; Andra Whiteside	21; 7	21; 14
2	(Australia) (Fiji)	Joy Tai; Alissa Dean	21; 7	21; 4
3	(Australia) (Fiji)	Setyana Mapasa / Gronya Somerville; Karyn Gibson / Andra Whiteside	21; 10	21; 10
4	(Australia) (Fiji)	Louisa Ma; Carline Bentley	21; 7	21; 6
5	(Australia) (Fiji)	Leanne Choo / Joy Lai; Alissa Dean / Danielle Whiteside	21; 5	21; 7

- Australia vs. New Zealand

Australia
3
Eastlink Badminton Stadium, WBA-7
7 February 2018 12:00

New Zealand
2

			1	2	3
1	(Australia) (New Zealand)	Jennifer Tam; Sally Fu	18; 21	21; 15	19; 21
2	(Australia) (New Zealand)	Joy Lai; Gaea Galvez	21; 15	21; 15
3	(Australia) (New Zealand)	Leanne Choo / Gronya Somerville; Erena Calder-Hawkins / Susannah Leydon-Davis	21; 7	21; 7
4	(Australia) (New Zealand)	Louisa Ma; Justine Villegas	21; 12	21; 15
5	(Australia) (New Zealand)	Joy Lai / Setyana Mapasa; Anona Pak / Danielle Tahuri	19; 21	21; 16	18; 21

- Fiji vs. Tahiti

Fiji
5
Eastlink Badminton Stadium, WBA-9
7 February 2018 12:00

Tahiti
0

			1	2	3
1	(Fiji) (French Polynesia)	Andra Whiteside; Esther Tau	21; 5	21; 5
2	(Fiji) (French Polynesia)	Karyn Gibson; Estelle Colombies	21; 10	21; 9
3	(Fiji) (French Polynesia)	Carline Bentley; Méissa Mi You	21; 19	21; 17
4	(Fiji) (French Polynesia)	Karyn Gibson / Andra Whiteside; Estelle Colombies / Esther Tau	21; 10	21; 11
5	(Fiji) (French Polynesia)	Alissa Dean / Danielle Whiteside; Ingrid Ateni / Méissa Mi You	21; 8	21; 6
