= Badminton at the 2022 Pacific Mini Games =

- Venue: Gilbert C. Ada Gymnasium
- Location: Saipan, Northern Mariana Islands
- Dates: 20–25 June
- Competitors: 64 from 7 nations

For the first time in the history of the Pacific Mini Games, the sport of badminton made its debut at the 2022 Pacific Mini Games in Saipan, Northern Mariana Islands. It was held at the Gilbert C. Ada Gymnasium from the 20-25 June 2022.

== Participating nations ==
As of 1 June 2022, seven countries and territories have confirmed their participation in badminton's debut for the games.

Pacific Games Associations
- Guam (6)
- New Caledonia (6)
- Northern Mariana Islands (12) (Host)
- Solomon Islands (8)
- Tahiti (12)
- Tuvalu (2)
- Wallis and Futuna (7)

== Medal summary ==
=== Medal table ===
* Host nation (Northern Mariana Islands)

Rank	Nation	Gold	Silver	Bronze	Total
1	Tahiti	6	1	4	11
2	New Caledonia	0	5	0	5
3	Northern Mariana Islands*	0	0	1	1
3	Wallis and Futuna	0	0	1	1
Totals (4 entries)		6	6	6	18

=== Medalists ===
Event	Gold	Silver	Bronze
Men's singles	(French Polynesia) Rémi Rossi	(New Caledonia) Yohan De Geoffroy	(French Polynesia) Quentin Bernaix
Women's singles	(French Polynesia) Jenica Lesourd	(New Caledonia) Marine Souviat	(French Polynesia) Mélissa Mi You
Men's doubles	(French Polynesia) Léo Cucuel (French Polynesia) Rémi Rossi	(French Polynesia) Glen Le Foll (French Polynesia) Kyliam Scilloux	(French Polynesia) Quentin Bernaix (French Polynesia) Elias Maublanc
Women's doubles	(French Polynesia) Jenica Lesourd (French Polynesia) Mélissa Mi You	(New Caledonia) Johanna Kou (New Caledonia) Marine Souviat	(Northern Mariana Islands) Janelle Panilinan (Northern Mariana Islands) Jenine Savellano
Mixed doubles	(French Polynesia) Rémi Rossi (French Polynesia) Mélissa Mi You	(New Caledonia) Yohan De Geoffroy (New Caledonia) Marine Souviat	(French Polynesia) Quentin Bernaix (French Polynesia) May Gaymann
Mixed team	Tahiti; Quentin Bernaix; Léo Cucuel; Glen Le Foll; Elias Maublanc; Rémi Rossi; Kyliam Scilloux; Ingrid Ateni; May Gaymann; Jenica Lesourd; Hortensia Manzanal; Mélissa Mi You; Waianuhea Teheura	New Caledonia; Yohan De Geoffroy; Lucas Juillot; Carl N'Guela; Johanna Kou; Marine Naveros; Marine Souviat	Wallis and Futuna; Damien Coffin; Julien Dauptain; Corentin Likiliki; Caroline Brial; Leilana Likuvalu; Malia Takasi; Endrina Tukumuli Nau

== Men's singles ==
=== Seeds ===
1. Rémi Rossi (TAH) (gold medalist)
2. Yohan De Geoffeoy (NCL) (silver medalist)
3. Quentin Bernaix (TAH) (bronze medalist)
4. Lucas Juillot (NCL) (second round)

=== Finals ===
Semi-finals
1	Rémi Rossi (TAH)	21	21
Léo Cucuel (TAH)	6	4
3/4	Quentin Bernaix (TAH)	21	12	20
2	Yohan De Geoffroy (NCL)	14	21	22

Gold medal match
1	Rémi Rossi (TAH)	21	21
2	Yohan De Geoffroy (NCL)	4	14
Bronze medal match
Léo Cucuel (TAH)	6	12
3/4	Quentin Bernaix (TAH)	21	21

=== Top half ===
==== Section 1 ====
First Round
J Dauptain (WLF)	w	/	o
C Hu (GUM)
M Ioane (TUV)	8	13
J Taupiri (SOL)	21	21

Second Round
1	R Rossi (TAH)	21	21
J Dauptain (WLF)	2	8
E Macario (NMI)	12	23	21
J Taupiri (SOL)	21	21	11

Quarter-finals
1	R Rossi (TAH)	21	21
E Macario (NMI)	5	3

==== Section 2 ====
First Round
J Pangilinan (NMI)	16	9
K Scilloux (TAH)	21	21
J Kalia (SOL)	8	9
A Galvez (NMI)	21	21
L Cucuel (TAH)	21	21
J Z Chung (GUM)	5	5

Second Round
3/4	L Juillot (NCL)	21	18	22
K Scilloux (TAH)	18	21	24
A Galvez (NMI)	17	10
L Cucuel (TAH)	21	21

Quarter-finals
K Scilloux (TAH)	17	18
L Cucuel (TAH)	21	21

=== Bottom half ===
==== Section 3 ====
First Round
S Li (GUM)	18	13
C Likiliki (WLF)	21	21
J Matiota (SOL)	15	6
L Manuel (NMI)	21	21
C N'Guela (NCL)	21	21
D Macario (NMI)	11	7

Second Round
C Likiliki (WLF)	21	21
L Manuel (NMI)	15	9
C N'Guela (NCL)	14	25
3/4	Q Bernaix (TAH)	21	27

Quarter-finals
C Likiliki (WLF)	7	16
3/4	Q Bernaix (TAH)	21	21

==== Section 4 ====
First Round
G Le Foll (TAH)	21	21
N Guerrero (NMI)	3	8
D Coffin (WLF)	21	21
R Vaka (SOL)	16	10
R Quilla (GUM)
E Maublanc (TAH)	w	/	o

Second Round
G Le Foll (TAH)	21	21
D Coffin (WLF)	11	4
E Maublanc (TAH)	8	20
2	Y De Geoffroy (NCL)	21	22

Quarter-finals
G Le Foll (TAH)	14	14
2	Y De Geoffroy (NCL)	21	21

== Women's singles ==
=== Seeds ===
1. Johanna Kou (NCL) (fourth place)
2. Mélissa Mi You (TAH) (bronze medalist)
3. Jenica Lesourd (TAH) (gold medalist)
4. Marine Souviat (NCL) (silver medalist)

=== Finals ===
Semi-finals
1	Johanna Kou (NCL)	13	21	16
3/4	Jenica Lesourd (TAH)	21	18	21
3/4	Marine Souviat (NCL)	21	22
2	Mélissa Mi You (TAH)	19	20

Gold medal match
3/4	Jenica Lesourd (TAH)	21	21
3/4	Marine Souviat (NCL)	16	19
Bronze medal match
1	Johanna Kou (NCL)	13	10
2	Mélissa Mi You (TAH)	21	21

=== Top half ===
==== Section 1 ====
First Round
B Resture (TUV)	6	8
J Silva (GUM)	21	21
C Temete (SOL)	10	12
M Gaymann (TAH)	21	21

Second Round
1	J Kou (NCL)	21	21
J Silva (GUM)	16	13
Mik Serrano (NMI)	8	4
M Gaymann (TAH)	21	21

Quarter-finals
1	J Kou (NCL)	21	21
M Gaymann (TAH)	13	10

==== Section 2 ====
First Round
M Takasi (WLF)	21	21
W Fernandez (NMI)	9	12
I Ateni (TAH)	15	14
M Naveros (NCL)	21	21

Second Round
3/4	J Lesourd (TAH)	21	21
M Takasi (WLF)	6	16
E Meke (SOL)	9	7
M Naveros (NCL)	21	21

Quarter-finals
3/4	J Lesourd (TAH)	21	21
M Naveros (NCL)	7	13

=== Bottom half ===
==== Section 3 ====
First Round
L Likuvalu (WLF)	10	8
Mic Serrano (NMI)	21	21
J Cardinio (NMI)	21	17	21
W Teheura (TAH)	13	21	13

Second Round
Mic Serrano (NMI)	21	21
N Meke (SOL)	10	4
J Cardinio (NMI)	8	3
3/4	M Souviat (NCL)	21	21

Quarter-finals
Mic Serrano (NMI)	3	8
3/4	M Souviat (NCL)	21	21

==== Section 4 ====
First Round
E Soaki (SOL)	6	3
H Manzanal (TAH)	21	21
J Pangilinan (NMI)	21	21
M Labang (GUM)	8	10

Second Round
H Manzanal (TAH)	21	21
E Tikumuli Nau (WLF)	11	12
J Pangilinan (NMI)	17	6
2	M Mi You (TAH)	21	21

Quarter-finals
H Manzanal (TAH)	13	14
2	M Mi You (TAH)	21	21

== Men's doubles ==
=== Seeds ===
1. Lucas Juillot / Carl N'Guela (NCL) (fourth place)
2. Léo Cucuel / Rémi Rossi (TAH) (gold medalist)

=== Finals ===
Semi-finals
1	Lucas Juillot (NCL); Carl N'Guela (NCL)	14	15
Glen Le Foll (TAH); Kyliam Scilloux (TAH)	21	21
Quentin Bernaix (TAH); Elias Maublanc (TAH)	11	16
2	Léo Cucuel (TAH); Rémi Rossi (TAH)	21	21

Gold medal match
Glen Le Foll (TAH); Kyliam Scilloux (TAH)	18	8
2	Léo Cucuel (TAH); Rémi Rossi (TAH)	21	21
Bronze medal match
1	Lucas Juillot (NCL); Carl N'Guela (NCL)	20	21	14
Quentin Bernaix (TAH); Elias Maublanc (TAH)	22	11	21

=== Top half ===
First Round
D Coffin (WLF); C Likiliki (WLF)	21	21
J Kalia (SOL); J Matiota (SOL)	11	10
N Guerrero (NMI); E Macario (NMI)	w	/	o
R Quilla (GUM); C Hu (GUM)

Quarter-finals
1	L Juillot (NCL); C N'Guela (NCL)	21	21
D Coffin (WLF); C Likiliki (WLF)	11	14
G Le Foll (TAH); K Scilloux (TAH)	21	21
N Guerrero (NMI); E Macario (NMI)	10	9

Semi-finals
1	L Juillot (NCL); C N'Guela (NCL)	14	15
G Le Foll (TAH); K Scilloux (TAH)	21	21

=== Bottom half ===
First Round
Q Bernaix (TAH); E Maublanc (TAH)	21	21
D Macario (NMI); L Manuel (NMI)	19	8
A Galvez (NMI); J Pangilinan (NMI)	21	21
J Taupiri (SOL); R Vaka (SOL)	7	9

Quarter-finals
Q Bernaix (TAH); E Maublanc (TAH)	21	21
J Z Chung (GUM); S Li (GUM)	6	6
A Galvez (NMI); J Pangilinan (NMI)	7	14
2	L Cucuel (TAH); R Rossi (TAH)	21	21

Semi-finals
Q Bernaix (TAH); E Maublanc (TAH)	11	16
2	L Cucuel (TAH); R Rossi (TAH)	21	21

== Women's doubles ==
=== Seeds ===
1. Johanna Kou / Marine Souviat (NCL) (silver medalist)
2. Jenica Lesourd / Mélissa Mi You (TAH) (gold medalist)

=== Finals ===
Semi-finals
1	Johanna Kou (NCL); Marine Souviat (NCL)	21	21
Hortensia Manzanal (TAH); Waianuhea Teheura (TAH)	5	15
Janelle Panilinan (NMI); Jenine Savellano (NMI)	19	7
2	Jenica Lesourd (TAH); Mélissa Mi You (TAH)	21	21

Gold medal match
1	Johanna Kou (NCL); Marine Souviat (NCL)	6	17
2	Jenica Lesourd (TAH); Mélissa Mi You (TAH)	21	21
Bronze medal match
Hortensia Manzanal (TAH); Waianuhea Teheura (TAH)	12	9
Janelle Panilinan (NMI); Jenine Savellano (NMI)	21	21

=== Top half ===
First Round
E Soaki (SOL); C Temete (SOL)	3	8
H Manzanal (TAH); W Teheura (TAH)	21	21

Quarter-finals
1	J Kou (NCL); M Souviat (NCL)	21	21
M Takasi (WLF); E Tukumuli Nau (WLF)	16	13
J Cardinio (NMI); Mik Serrano (NMI)	17	11
H Manzanal (TAH); W Teheura (TAH)	21	21

Semi-finals
1	J Kou (NCL); M Souviat (NCL)	21	21
H Manzanal (TAH); W Teheura (TAH)	5	15

=== Bottom half ===
First Round
I Ateni (TAH); M Gaymann (TAH)	21	19	21
M Labang (GUM); J Silva (GUM)	10	21	13
W Fernandez (NMI); Mic Serrano (NMI)	21	21
E Meke (SOL); N Meke (SOL)	7	10

Quarter-finals
I Ateni (TAH); M Gaymann (TAH)	22	18
J Panilinan (NMI); J Savellano (NMI)	24	21
W Fernandez (NMI); Mic Serrano (NMI)	6	5
2	J Lesourd (TAH); M Mi You (TAH)	21	21

Semi-finals
J Panilinan (NMI); J Savellano (NMI)	19	7
2	J Lesourd (TAH); M Mi You (TAH)	21	21

== Mixed doubles ==
=== Seeds ===
1. Rémi Rossi / Mélissa Mi You (TAH) (gold medalist)
2. Yohan De Geoffroy / Marine Souviat (NCL) (silver medalist)
3. Lucas Juillot / Marine Naveros (NCL) (second round)
4. CArl N'Guela / Johanna Kou (NCL) (second round)

=== Finals ===
Semi-finals
1	Rémi Rossi (TAH); Mélissa Mi You (TAH)	21	21
Quentin Bernaix (TAH); May Gaymann (TAH)	13	16
Léo Cucuel (TAH); Ingrid Ateni (TAH)	13	15
2	Yohan De Geoffroy (NCL); Marine Souviat (NCL)	21	21

Gold medal match
1	Rémi Rossi (TAH); Mélissa Mi You (TAH)	21	21
2	Yohan De Geoffroy (NCL); Marine Souviat (NCL)	10	9
Bronze medal match
Quentin Bernaix (TAH); May Gaymann (TAH)	21	19	21
Léo Cucuel (TAH); Ingrid Ateni (TAH)	9	21	18

=== Top half ===
==== Section 1 ====
First Round
J Dauptain (WLF); L Likuvalu (WLF)	14	16
N Guerrero (NMI); J Pangilinan (NMI)	21	21

Second Round
1	R Rossi (TAH); M Mi You (TAH)	21	21
M Ioane (TUV); B Resture (TUV)	5	4
R Vaka (SOL); E Soaki (SOL)	9	7
N Guerrero (NMI); J Pangilinan (NMI)	21	21

Quarter-finals
1	R Rossi (TAH); M Mi You (TAH)	21	21
N Guerrero (NMI); J Pangilinan (NMI)	16	7

==== Section 2 ====
First Round
Q Bernaix (TAH); M Gaymann (TAH)	21	21
J Taupiri (SOL); C Temete (SOL)	3	9
D Macario (NMI); J Savellano (NMI)	15	15
K Scilloux (TAH); H Manzanal (TAH)	21	21

Second Round
3/4	C N'Guela (NCL); J Kou (NCL)	21	12	25
Q Bernaix (TAH); M Gaymann (TAH)	19	21	27
C Likiliki (WLF); E Tukumuli Nau (WLF)	11	20
K Scilloux (TAH); H Manzanal (TAH)	21	22

Quarter-finals
Q Bernaix (TAH); M Gaymann (TAH)	21	17	21
K Scilloux (TAH); H Manzanal (TAH)	14	21	13

=== Bottom half ===
==== Section 3 ====
First Round
R Quilla (GUM); J Silva (GUM)
G Le Foll (TAH); J Lesourd (TAH)	w	/	o
L Cucuel (TAH); I Ateni (TAH)	21	21
J Matiota (SOL); N Meke (SOL)	6	6

Second Round
G Le Foll (TAH); J Lesourd (TAH)	21	21
J Pangilinan (NMI); W Fernandez (NMI)	15	18
L Cucuel (TAH); I Ateni (TAH)	21	21
3/4	L Juillot (NCL); M Naveros (NCL)	18	15

Quarter-finals
G Le Foll (TAH); J Lesourd (TAH)	19	11
L Cucuel (TAH); I Ateni (TAH)	21	21

==== Section 4 ====
First Round
L Manuel (NMI); J Cardinio (NMI)	21	21
J Kalia (SOL); E Meke (SOL)	9	12

Second Round
L Manuel (NMI); J Cardinio (NMI)	13	19
E Maublanc (TAH); W Teheura (TAH)	21	21
D Coffin (WLF); M Takasi (WLF)	11	16
2	Y De Geoffroy (NCL); M Souviat (NCL)	21	21

Quarter-finals
E Maublanc (TAH); W Teheura (TAH)	11	9
2	Y De Geoffroy (NCL); M Souviat (NCL)	21	21

== Mixed team ==
=== Standings ===
Pos	Team	Pld	W	L	MF	MA	MD	GF	GA	GD	PF	PA	PD	Pts	
1	Tahiti	5	5	0	25	0	+25	50	2	+48	1087	499	+588	5	Gold medal
2	New Caledonia	5	4	1	19	6	+13	40	12	+28	1014	665	+349	4	Silver medal
3	Wallis and Futuna	5	3	2	12	13	−1	25	29	−4	912	906	+6	3	Bronze medal
4	Northern Mariana Islands (H)	5	2	3	12	13	−1	26	27	−1	871	913	−42	2	
5	Guam	5	1	4	7	18	−11	16	37	−21	734	983	−249	1	
6	Solomon Islands	5	0	5	0	25	−25	0	50	−50	398	1050	−652	0	

Updated to match(es) played on 20 June 2022. Source: TS
(H) Host

==== Tahiti vs. Northern Mariana Islands ====
Tahiti
5
Gilbert C. Ada Gymnasium, Court 1
June 20, 2022, 9:00 UTC+10

Northern Mariana Islands
0

			1	2	3
1	(French Polynesia) (Northern Mariana Islands)	Rémi Rossi / Mélissa Mi You; Jordan Pangilinan / Windy Fernandez	21; 8	21; 9
2	(French Polynesia) (Northern Mariana Islands)	Quenrin Bernaix; Andreau Galvez	21; 8	21; 8
3	(French Polynesia) (Northern Mariana Islands)	Jenica Lesourd; Janelle Pangilinan	21; 19	21; 2
4	(French Polynesia) (Northern Mariana Islands)	Rémi Rossi / Kyliam Scilloux; Andreau Galvez / Jordan Pangilinan	21; 12	21; 7
5	(French Polynesia) (Northern Mariana Islands)	Jenica Lesourd / Mélissa Mi You; Janelle Pangilinan / Jenine Savellano	21; 8	19; 21	21; 19

==== Guam vs. Solomon Islands ====
Guam
5
Gilbert C. Ada Gymnasium, Court 2
June 20, 2022, 9:00 UTC+10

Solomon Islands
0

			1	2	3
1	(Guam) (Solomon Islands)	Sunardi Li / Jennica Silva; Joseph Taupiri / Catherine Temete	21; 12	21; 17
2	(Guam) (Solomon Islands)	Raynold Quilla; Rodney Vaka	21; 8	21; 10
3	(Guam) (Solomon Islands)	Mary Labang; Emma Soaki	21; 6	21; 4
4	(Guam) (Solomon Islands)	Sunardi Li / Raynold Quilla; Jeffery Kalia / Joseph Matiota	21; 8	21; 4
5	(Guam) (Solomon Islands)	Mary Labang / Jennica Silva; Elizabeth Meke / Norah Meke	21; 8	21; 10

==== New Caledonia vs. Wallis and Futuna ====
New Caledonia
4
Gilbert C. Ada Gymnasium, Court 3
June 20, 2022, 9:00 UTC+10

Wallis and Futuna
1

			1	2	3
1	(New Caledonia) (Wallis and Futuna)	Yohan De Geoffroy / Marine Naveros; Corentin Likiliki / Malia Takasi	21; 17	21; 11
2	(New Caledonia) (Wallis and Futuna)	Lucas Juillot; Julien Dauptain	21; 15	9; 21	17; 21
3	(New Caledonia) (Wallis and Futuna)	Marine Souviat; Leilana Likuvalu	21; 5	21; 8
4	(New Caledonia) (Wallis and Futuna)	Lucas Juillot / Carl N'Guela; Damien Coffin / Corentin Likiliki	21; 15	21; 13
5	(New Caledonia) (Wallis and Futuna)	Johanna Kou / Marine Souviat; Malia Takasi / Endrina Tukumuli Nau	21; 12	21; 19

==== Wallis and Futuna vs. Guam ====
Wallis and Futuna
3
Gilbert C. Ada Gymnasium, Court 1
June 20, 2022, 14:00 UTC+10

Guam
2

			1	2	3
1	(Wallis and Futuna) (Guam)	Julien Dauptain / Leilana Likuvalu; Sunardi Li / Jennica Silva	21; 23	21; 13	19; 21
2	(Wallis and Futuna) (Guam)	Malia Takasi; Mary Labang	21; 7	21; 13
3	(Wallis and Futuna) (Guam)	Julien Dauptain; Raynold Quilla	21; 14	21; 10
4	(Wallis and Futuna) (Guam)	Malia Takasi / Endrina Tukumuli Nau; Mary Labang / Jennica Silva	21; 9	18; 21	21; 18
5	(Wallis and Futuna) (Guam)	Damien Coffin / Corentin Likiliki; Sunardi Li / Raynold Quilla	20; 22	23; 25

==== New Caledonia vs. Northern Mariana Islands ====
New Caledonia
5
Gilbert C. Ada Gymnasium, Court 2
June 20, 2022, 14:00 UTC+10

Northern Mariana Islands
0

			1	2	3
1	(New Caledonia) (Northern Mariana Islands)	Carl N'Guela / Johanna Kou; Nathan Guerrero / Janelle Pangilinan	21; 18	21; 13
2	(New Caledonia) (Northern Mariana Islands)	Marine Naveros; Jeanelyn Cardinio	21; 9	21; 12
3	(New Caledonia) (Northern Mariana Islands)	Carl N'Guela; Daniel Macario	21; 13	21; 6
4	(New Caledonia) (Northern Mariana Islands)	Yohan De Geoffroy / Lucas Juillot; Nathan Guerrero / Ezekiel Macario	21; 6	21; 12
5	(New Caledonia) (Northern Mariana Islands)	Johanna Kou / Marine Souviat; Janelle Pangilinan / Jenine Savellano	21; 18	21; 8

==== Tahiti vs. Solomon Islands ====
Tahiti
5
Gilbert C. Ada Gymnasium, Court 3
June 20, 2022, 14:00 UTC+10

Solomon Islands
0

			1	2	3
1	(French Polynesia) (Solomon Islands)	Elias Maublanc; Joseph Matiota	21; 5	21; 9
2	(French Polynesia) (Solomon Islands)	Waianuhea Teheura; Norah Meke	21; 10	21; 7
3	(French Polynesia) (Solomon Islands)	Elias Maublanc / Kyliam Scilloux; Joseph Taupiri / Rodney Vaka	21; 6	21; 7
4	(French Polynesia) (Solomon Islands)	Ingrid Ateni / May Gaymann; Emma Soaki / Catherine Temete	21; 5	21; 5
5	(French Polynesia) (Solomon Islands)	Glen Le Foll / Hortensia Manzanal; Jeffery Kalia / Elizabeth Meke	21; 6	21; 4

==== Northern Mariana Islands vs. Solomon Islands ====
Northern Mariana Islands
5
Gilbert C. Ada Gymnasium, Court 1
June 21, 2022, 9:00 UTC+10

Solomon Islands
0

			1	2	3
1	(Northern Mariana Islands) (Solomon Islands)	Andreau Galvez / Windy Fernandez; Joseph Matiota / Norah Meke	21; 7	21; 10
2	(Northern Mariana Islands) (Solomon Islands)	Leonard Manuel; Jeffery Kalia	21; 15	21; 13
3	(Northern Mariana Islands) (Solomon Islands)	Janelle Pangilinan; Elizabeth Meke	21; 10	21; 6
4	(Northern Mariana Islands) (Solomon Islands)	Ezekiel Macario / Jordan Pangilinan; Joseph Taupiri / Rodney Vaka	21; 8	21; 11
5	(Northern Mariana Islands) (Solomon Islands)	Windy Fernandez / Jenine Savellano; Emma Soaki / Catherine Temete	21; 12	21; 4

==== Tahiti vs. Wallis and Futuna ====
Tahiti
5
Gilbert C. Ada Gymnasium, Court 2
June 21, 2022, 9:00 UTC+10

Wallis and Futuna
0

			1	2	3
1	(French Polynesia) (Wallis and Futuna)	Quentin Bernaix; Corentin Likiliki	21; 5	21; 10
2	(French Polynesia) (Wallis and Futuna)	Jenica Lesourd; Leilana Likuvalu	21; 5	21; 8
3	(French Polynesia) (Wallis and Futuna)	Rémi Rossi / Kyliam Scilloux; Damien Coffin / Corentin Likiliki	21; 6	21; 9
4	(French Polynesia) (Wallis and Futuna)	Jenica Lesourd / Mélissa Mi You; Malia Takasi / Endrina Tukumuli Nau	21; 13	21; 18
5	(French Polynesia) (Wallis and Futuna)	Rémi Rossi / May Gaymann; Damien Coffin / Caroline Brial	21; 2	21; 3

==== New Caledonia vs. Guam ====
New Caledonia
5
Gilbert C. Ada Gymnasium, Court 3
June 21, 2022, 9:00 UTC+10

Guam
0

			1	2	3
1	(New Caledonia) (Guam)	Yohan De Geoffroy / Marine Souviat; Raynold Quilla / Mary Labang	21; 10	21; 11
2	(New Caledonia) (Guam)	Johanna Kou; Jennica Silva	21; 14	21; 15
3	(New Caledonia) (Guam)	Yohan De Geoffroy; Raynold Quilla	21; 4	21; 4
4	(New Caledonia) (Guam)	Johanna Kou / Marine Naveros; Mary Labang / Jennica Silva	21; 18	21; 19
5	(New Caledonia) (Guam)	Lucas Juillot / Carl N'Guela; Jin Zhe Chung / Chen Hu	21; 3	21; 4

==== New Caledonia vs. Solomon Islands ====
New Caledonia
5
Gilbert C. Ada Gymnasium, Court 1
June 21, 2022, 14:00 UTC+10

Solomon Islands
0

			1	2	3
1	(New Caledonia) (Solomon Islands)	Carl N'Guela; Joseph Taupiri	21; 7	21; 3
2	(New Caledonia) (Solomon Islands)	Marine Naveros; Catherine Temete	21; 6	21; 8
3	(New Caledonia) (Solomon Islands)	Yohan De Geoffroy / Carl N'Guela; Jeffery Kalia / Joseph Matiota	21; 6	21; 6
4	(New Caledonia) (Solomon Islands)	Johanna Kou / Marine Souviat; Elizabeth Meke / Norah Meke	21; 8	21; 5
5	(New Caledonia) (Solomon Islands)	Lucas Juillot / Marine Naveros; Rodney Vaka / Emma Soaki	21; 7	21; 7

==== Northern Mariana Islands vs. Wallis and Futuna ====
Northern Mariana Islands
2
Gilbert C. Ada Gymnasium, Court 2
June 21, 2022, 14:00 UTC+10

Wallis and Futuna
3

			1	2	3
1	(Northern Mariana Islands) (Wallis and Futuna)	Nathan Guerrero / Jenine Savellano; Julien Dauptain / Leilana Likuvalu	11; 21	21; 17	18; 21
2	(Northern Mariana Islands) (Wallis and Futuna)	Janelle Pangilinan; Malia Takasi	16; 21	12; 21
3	(Northern Mariana Islands) (Wallis and Futuna)	Andreau Galvez; Julien Dauptain	11; 21	19; 21
4	(Northern Mariana Islands) (Wallis and Futuna)	Janelle Pangilinan / Jenine Savellano; Malia Takasi / Endrina Tukumuli Nau	21; 18	26; 24
5	(Northern Mariana Islands) (Wallis and Futuna)	Andreau Galvez / Jordan Pangilinan; Damien Coffin / Corentin Likiliki	21; 14	21; 19

==== Tahiti vs. Guam ====
Tahiti
5
Gilbert C. Ada Gymnasium, Court 3
June 21, 2022, 14:00 UTC+10

Guam
0

			1	2	3
1	(French Polynesia) (Guam)	Rémi Rossi / May Gaymann; Raynold Quilla / Jennica Silva	21; 6	21; 7
2	(French Polynesia) (Guam)	Quentin Bernaix; Chen Hu	21; 6	21; 7
3	(French Polynesia) (Guam)	Mélissa Mi You; Mary Labang	21; 5	21; 4
4	(French Polynesia) (Guam)	Léo Cucuel / Glen Le Foll; Jin Zhe Chung / Chen Hu	21; 2	21; 3
5	(French Polynesia) (Guam)	Ingrid Ateni / Hortensia Manzanal; Mary Labang / Jennica Silva	21; 17	21; 9

==== New Caledonia vs. Tahiti ====
New Caledonia
0
Gilbert C. Ada Gymnasium, Court 1
June 22, 2022, 11:00 UTC+10

Tahiti
5

			1	2	3
1	(New Caledonia) (French Polynesia)	Yohan De Geoffroy / Marine Souviat; Rémi Rossi / May Gaymann	17; 21	17; 21
2	(New Caledonia) (French Polynesia)	Johanna Kou; Jenica Lesourd	19; 21	14; 21
3	(New Caledonia) (French Polynesia)	Carl N'Guela; Quentin Bernaix	21; 18	19; 21	18; 21
4	(New Caledonia) (French Polynesia)	Johanna Kou / Marine Souviat; Jenica Lesourd / Mélissa Mi You	12; 21	14; 21
5	(New Caledonia) (French Polynesia)	Yohan De Geoffroy / Carl N'Guela; Rémi Rossi / Kyliam Scilloux	8; 21	10; 21

==== Guam vs. Northern Mariana Islands ====
Guam
0
Gilbert C. Ada Gymnasium, Court 2
June 22, 2022, 11:00 UTC+10

Northern Mariana Islands
5

			1	2	3
1	(Guam) (Northern Mariana Islands)	Jin Zhe Chung / Mary Labang; Andreau Galvez / Jenine Savellano	8; 21	13; 21
2	(Guam) (Northern Mariana Islands)	Jennica Silva; Janelle Pangilinan	14; 21	17; 21
3	(Guam) (Northern Mariana Islands)	Sunardi Li; Daniel Macario	21; 17	20; 22	18; 21
4	(Guam) (Northern Mariana Islands)	Mary Labang / Jennica Silva; Janelle Pangilinan / Jenine Savellano	18; 21	17; 21
5	(Guam) (Northern Mariana Islands)	Jin Zhe Chung / Sunardi Li; Andreau Galvez / Jordan Pangilinan	4; 21	10; 21

==== Wallis and Futuna vs. Solomon Islands ====
Wallis and Futuna
5
Gilbert C. Ada Gymnasium, Court 3
June 22, 2022, 11:00 UTC+10

Solomon Islands
0

			1	2	3
1	(Wallis and Futuna) (Solomon Islands)	Julien Dauptain; Joseph Taupiri	21; 9	21; 13
2	(Wallis and Futuna) (Solomon Islands)	Malia Takasi; Catherine Temete	21; 4	21; 10
3	(Wallis and Futuna) (Solomon Islands)	Damien Coffin / Corentin Likiliki; Jeffery Kalia / Joseph Matiota	21; 13	21; 10
4	(Wallis and Futuna) (Solomon Islands)	Malia Takasi / Endrina Tukumuli Nau; Elizabeth Meke / Norah Meke	21; 8	21; 4
5	(Wallis and Futuna) (Solomon Islands)	Julien Dauptain / Leilana Likuvalu; Rodney Vaka / Emma Soaki	21; 5	21; 12
