= Guam national badminton team =

National badminton team representing Guam

Guam
- Association: Guam National Badminton Federation (GNBF)
- Confederation: BO (Oceania)
- President: Sandra Low

BWF ranking
- Current ranking: 115 ▼1 (2 January 2024)
- Highest ranking: 43 (5 April 2018)

Sudirman Cup
- Appearances: 1 (first in 2017)
- Best result: Group stage

Oceania Mixed Team Championships
- Appearances: 2 (first in 2016)
- Best result: 6th (2016, 2019)

Oceania Women's Team Championships
- Appearances: 1 (first in 2016)
- Best result: 5th (2016)

The Guam national badminton team represents Guam, an organized, unincorporated territory of the United States in the Micronesia subregion of the western Pacific Ocean, in international badminton team competitions.

== Participation in BWF competitions ==
Sudirman Cup

Year	Result
2017	26th - Group 3

== Participation in Oceania Badminton Championships ==
Women's team

Year	Result
2016	5th place

Mixed team

Year	Result
2016	6th place
2019	6th place

== Participation in Pacific Mini Games ==
Mixed team

Year	Result
2022	5th place

== Junior competitive record ==
=== Oceania Junior Team Championships ===
==== Mixed team ====
Year	Round	Pos
2011	Did not enter	
2013	Did not enter	
2015	Did not enter	
2017	Did not enter	
2019	Did not enter	
2023	Did not enter	
2025	Group stage	7th

**Red border color indicates tournament was held on home soil.

== Players ==
=== Current squad ===
As of 2 January 2024

==== Men's team ====
Name	DoB/Age	Ranking of event		
Name	DoB/Age	MS	MD	XD
Allan Zeng	27 April 1998 (age 28)	598	455	683
Chenyang Hu	27 May 2007 (age 19)	811	455	-
Junior Baptista	11 October 1992 (age 33)	-	-	-

==== Women's team ====
Name	DoB/Age	Ranking of event		
Name	DoB/Age	WS	WD	XD
Kristine Deng	15 January 2008 (age 18)	-	-	683
Gabby Skirvin	1 June 2001 (age 25)	-	-	-
Sarah Cai	1 June 2001 (age 25)	-	-	-
