= Louisa Ma =

Australian badminton player (born 1994)

Personal information
- Born: 26 November 1994 (age 31)

Sport
- Country: Australia
- Sport: Badminton

Women's singles
- Career record: 51 wins, 44 losses
- Highest ranking: 92 (10 December 2019)
- Current ranking: 95 (17 March 2020)
Medal record
Women's badminton
Representing Australia
Oceania Championships
Silver medal – second place	2014 Ballarat	Women's doubles
Silver medal – second place	2018 Hamilton	Women's singles
Silver medal – second place	2019 Melbourne	Women's doubles
Silver medal – second place	2020 Ballarat	Women's singles
Silver medal – second place	2022 Melbourne	Women's singles
Bronze medal – third place	2015 North Harbour	Women's doubles
Bronze medal – third place	2019 Melbourne	Women's singles
Bronze medal – third place	2023 Auckland	Women's singles
Oceania Women's Team Championships
Gold medal – first place	2018 Hamilton	Women's team
Gold medal – first place	2020 Ballarat	Women's team
Oceania Mixed Team Championships
Gold medal – first place	2019 Melbourne	Mixed team
Gold medal – first place	2023 Auckland	Mixed team
Oceania Junior Championships
Gold medal – first place	2011 Fiji	Mixed doubles
Bronze medal – third place	2011 Fiji	Women's singles

Louisa Ma (born 26 November 1994) is an Australian badminton player who competes in international level events.

== Achievements ==
=== Oceania Championships ===
Women's singles
Year	Venue	Opponent	Score	Result
2018	Eastlink Badminton Stadium, Hamilton, New Zealand	(Australia) Chen Hsuan-yu	7–21, 14–21	Silver
2019	Melbourne Sports & Aquatic Centre, Melbourne, Australia	(Australia) Yingzi Jiang	19–21, 14–21	Bronze
2020	Ken Kay Badminton Stadium, Ballarat, Australia	(Australia) Chen Hsuan-yu	15–21, 11–21	Silver
2022	Melbourne Sports and Aquatic Centre, Melbourne, Australia	(Australia) Chen Hsuan-yu	17–21, 18–21	Silver
2023	Auckland Badminton Stadium, Auckland, New Zealand	(New Zealand) Shaunna Li	18–21, 15–21	Bronze

Women's doubles
Year	Venue	Partner	Opponent	Score	Result
2014	Ken Kay Badminton Stadium; Ballarat, Australia	(Australia) Jacinta Joe	(Australia) Jacqueline Guan (Australia) Gronya Somerville	14–21, 17–21	Silver
2015	X-TRM North Harbour Badminton Centre; Auckland, New Zealand	(Australia) Chen Hsuan-yu	(Australia) Leanne Choo (Australia) Gronya Somerville	18–21, 16–21	Bronze
2019	Melbourne Sports & Aquatic Centre; Melbourne, Australia	(Australia) Yingzi Jiang	(Australia) Setyana Mapasa (Australia) Gronya Somerville	10–21, 9–21	Silver
