= Pit Seng Low =

Australian badminton player (born 1995)

Pit Seng Low 罗必胜
Personal information
- Born: 9 May 1995 (age 31)

Sport
- Country: Australia
- Sport: Badminton
- Handedness: Right

Men's singles & doubles
- Highest ranking: 139 (MS 23 March 2017); 84 (MD 1 September 2016); 217 (XD 23 October 2014)
- BWF profile
Medal record
Men's badminton
Representing Australia
Oceania Championships
Gold medal – first place	2017 Nouméa	Men's singles
Bronze medal – third place	2015 North Harbour	Men's doubles
Bronze medal – third place	2016 Papeete	Men's doubles
Oceania Men's Team Championships
Gold medal – first place	2018 Hamilton	Men's team
Silver medal – second place	2016 Auckland	Men's team

Pit Seng Low (born 9 May 1995) is an Australian badminton player. He won the men's doubles title at the 2015 New Caledonia International tournament partnered with Anthony Joe. Low was the gold medalist at the 2017 Oceania Championships in the men's singles event.

== Achievements ==
=== Oceania Championships ===
Men's singles
Year	Venue	Opponent	Score	Result
2017	Salle Anewy; Nouméa, New Caledonia	(New Zealand) Niccolo Tagle	21–17, 13–21, 21–13	Gold

Men's doubles
Year	Venue	Partner	Opponent	Score	Result
2015	X-TRM North Harbour Badminton Centre; Auckland, New Zealand	(Australia) Anthony Joe	(New Zealand) Kevin James Dennerly-Minturn (New Zealand) Oliver Leydon-Davis	15–21, 13–21	Bronze
2016	Punaauia University Hall; Papeete, Tahiti	(Australia) Anthony Joe	(French Polynesia) Léo Cucuel (French Polynesia) Rémi Rossi	16–21, 17–21	Bronze

=== BWF International Challenge/Series ===
Men's doubles
Year	Tournament	Partner	Opponent	Score	Result
2011	Fiji International	(Australia) Michael Fariman	(Australia) Wesley Caulkett (Australia) Raymond Tam	8–21, 13–21	(silver) Runner-up
2015	New Caledonia International	(Australia) Anthony Joe	(New Zealand) Maoni Hu He (New Zealand) Shane Masinipeni	21–15, 21–12	(gold) Winner

Mixed doubles
Year	Tournament	Partner	Opponent	Score	Result
2019	Benin International	(Australia) Louisa Ma	(United States) Howard Shu (United States) Paula Lynn Obañana	12–21, 13–21	(silver) Runner-up

BWF International Challenge tournament
BWF International Series tournament
BWF Future Series tournament
