= Rémi Rossi =

Tahitian badminton player (born 1995)

Personal information
- Born: 23 December 1995 (age 30) Grasse, France

Sport
- Country: Tahiti
- Sport: Badminton

Men's singles & doubles
- Highest ranking: 201 (MS 16 August 2018); 152 (MD 22 September 2016)
- Current ranking: 346 (22 November 2022)
- BWF profile
Medal record
Men's badminton
Representing Tahiti
Pacific Games
| Gold medal – first place | 2019 Samoa | Men's singles |
| Gold medal – first place | 2019 Samoa | Men's doubles |
| Gold medal – first place | 2019 Samoa | Mixed doubles |
| Bronze medal – third place | 2011 New Caledonia | Mixed team |
| Bronze medal – third place | 2019 Samoa | Mixed team |
Oceania Championships
| Silver medal – second place | 2016 Papeete | Men's singles |
| Silver medal – second place | 2016 Papeete | Men's doubles |
| Silver medal – second place | 2018 Hamilton | Men's singles |
| Silver medal – second place | 2019 Melbourne | Men's singles |
| Bronze medal – third place | 2023 Auckland | Men's singles |
Oceania Mixed Team Championships
| Bronze medal – third place | 2025 Auckland | Mixed team |
Oceania Men's Team Championships
| Bronze medal – third place | 2018 Hamilton | Men's team |
Pacific Mini Games
| Gold medal – first place | 2022 Saipan | Mixed team |
| Gold medal – first place | 2022 Saipan | Mixed doubles |
| Gold medal – first place | 2022 Saipan | Men's singles |
| Gold medal – first place | 2022 Saipan | Men's doubles |
Oceania Junior Championships
| Silver medal – second place | 2013 Papeete | Boys' singles |
| Silver medal – second place | 2013 Papeete | Boys' doubles |
| Bronze medal – third place | 2013 Papeete | Mixed team |

Rémi Rossi (born 23 December 1995) is a Tahitian badminton player. He started playing badminton at the age of ten, coached by his father Patrick. In 2013, he went to France, studies engineering at Lyon University. His brother Léo Rossi also plays badminton for France which was the medalists at the European U17 Championships. In 2016, Rémi Rossi won silver medals at the Oceania Badminton Championships in men's singles event and men's doubles event partnered with Léo Cucuel. In the men's singles event he beat the No.1 and No.3 seeds Pit Seng Low and Anthony Joe before losing to Ashwant Gobinathan of Australia in the final round with the score 21–17, 21–16. In the men's doubles, he was partnered with Léo Cucuel, and the dou also defeated by the Australian pair Chau and Serasinghe in the straight set. Rossi also play for Badminton Club Oullins (Baco) in France. In 2019, he swept all three individual gold medals at the 2019 Samoa Pacific Games.

== Achievements ==
=== Pacific Games ===
Men's singles
| Year | Venue | Opponent | Score | Result |
|---|---|---|---|---|
| 2019 | Faleata Sports Complex, Tuanaimato, Samoa | (New Caledonia) Yohan De Geoffroy | 21–11, 21–11 | Gold |

Men's doubles
| Year | Venue | Partner | Opponent | Score | Result |
|---|---|---|---|---|---|
| 2019 | Faleata Sports Complex; Tuanaimato, Samoa | (French Polynesia) Rauhiri Goguenheim | (French Polynesia) Quentin Bernaix (French Polynesia) Tarepa Bourgery | 21–16, 21–13 | Gold |

Mixed doubles
| Year | Venue | Partner | Opponent | Score | Result |
|---|---|---|---|---|---|
| 2019 | Faleata Sports Complex; Tuanaimato, Samoa | (French Polynesia) Coralie Bouttin | (Fiji) Burty Molia (Fiji) Karyn Gibson | 21–12, 21–12 | Gold |

=== Oceania Championships ===
Men's singles
| Year | Venue | Opponent | Score | Result |
|---|---|---|---|---|
| 2016 | Punaauia University Hall, Papeete, Tahiti | (Australia) Ashwant Gobinathan | 17–21, 16–21 | Silver |
| 2018 | Eastlink Badminton Stadium, Hamilton, New Zealand | (New Zealand) Abhinav Manota | 12–21, 14–21 | Silver |
| 2019 | Melbourne Sports and Aquatic Centre, Melbourne, Australia | (New Zealand) Oscar Guo | 22–24, 22–20, 15–21 | Silver |
| 2023 | Auckland Badminton Stadium, Auckland, New Zealand | (New Zealand) Edward Lau | 19–21, 15–21 | Bronze |

Men's doubles
| Year | Venue | Partner | Opponent | Score | Result |
|---|---|---|---|---|---|
| 2016 | Punaauia University Hall; Papeete, Tahiti | (French Polynesia) Léo Cucuel | (Australia) Matthew Chau (Australia) Sawan Serasinghe | 11–21, 12–21 | Silver |

=== Pacific Mini Games ===
Men's singles
| Year | Venue | Opponent | Score | Result |
|---|---|---|---|---|
| 2022 | Gilbert C. Ada Gymnasium, Saipan, Northern Mariana Islands | (New Caledonia) Yohan De Geoffroy | 21–4, 21–14 | Gold |

Men's doubles
| Year | Venue | Partner | Opponent | Score | Result |
|---|---|---|---|---|---|
| 2022 | Gilbert C. Ada Gymnasium; Saipan, Northern Mariana Islands | (French Polynesia) Léo Cucuel | (French Polynesia) Glen Le Foll (French Polynesia) Kyliam Scilloux | 21–18, 21–8 | Gold |

Mixed doubles
| Year | Venue | Partner | Opponent | Score | Result |
|---|---|---|---|---|---|
| 2022 | Gilbert C. Ada Gymnasium; Saipan, Northern Mariana Islands | (French Polynesia) Mélissa Mi You | (New Caledonia) Yohan De Geoffroy (New Caledonia) Marine Souviat | 21–10, 21–9 | Gold |

=== Oceania Junior Championships ===
Boys' singles
| Year | Venue | Opponent | Score | Result |
|---|---|---|---|---|
| 2013 | University of French Polynesia Sports Hall, Papeete, Tahiti | (Australia) Daniel Guda | 14–21, 20–22 | Silver |

Boys' doubles
| Year | Venue | Partner | Opponent | Score | Result |
|---|---|---|---|---|---|
| 2013 | University of French Polynesia Sports Hall; Papeete, Tahiti | (French Polynesia) Antoine Beaubois | (New Zealand) Dylan Soedjasa (New Zealand) Daniel Lee | 12–21, 18–21 | Silver |
