= 2016 Oceania Badminton Championships =

Tournament details
- Dates: 16-21 February 2016 (Team); 25-28 April 2016 (Individual)
- Venue: North Harbour Badminton Centre (Team); Punaauia University Hall (Individual)
- Location: Auckland, New Zealand (Team); Papeete, Tahiti (Individual)

The XI 2016 Oceania Badminton Championships were held as two events in different counties. From 16 to 21 February, the team event was held in Auckland, New Zealand. From 25 to 28 April, the individual event was held in Papeete, Tahiti.

== Venue ==
- X-TRM North Harbour Badminton Centre in Auckland, New Zealand for the team event, and Punaauia University Hall, within the University of French Polynesia in Papeete, Tahiti for the individual event.

== Medalists ==
=== Team event ===
In the mixed team event, Australia national badminton team won the gold medal after topped the standings in the round roubin stage. Australia also won the gold medal for the women's team event, while New Zealand won the gold medal in the men's team event.

Event	Gold	Silver	Bronze
Mixed team	Australia; Matthew Chau, Michael Fariman, Anthony Joe, Robin Middleton, Sawan Serasinghe; Wendy Chen Hsuan-yu, Leanne Choo, Joy Lai, Gronya Somerville	New Zealand; Kevin Dennerly-Minturn, Oliver Leydon-Davis, Asher Richardson, Dylan Soedjasa, Niccolo Tagle; Michelle Chan Ky, Vicki Copeland, Susannah Leydon-Davis, Anna Rankin, Danielle Tahuri, Deborah Yin	French Polynesia; Michael Ajonc, Quentin Bernaix, Leo Cucuel, Hugo Sautereau, Kyliam Scilloux; Aurelia Bouttin, Coralie Bouttin, Chloé Segrestan, Pauline Segrestan
Men's team	New Zealand; Kevin Dennerly-Minturn, James Eunson, Michael Fowke, Oliver Leydon-Davis, Asher Richardson, Dylan Soedjasa, Niccolo Tagle	Australia; Wesley Caulkett, Matthew Chau, Michael Fariman, Anthony Joe, Pit Seng Low, Robin Middleton, Sawan Serasinghe	French Polynesia; Michael Ajonc, Quentin Bernaix, Leo Cucuel, Hugo Sautereau, Kyliam Scilloux
Women's team	Australia; Wendy Chen Hsuan-yu, Leanne Choo, Joy Lai, Gronya Somerville, Jennifer Tam	New Zealand; Michelle Chan Ky, Vicki Copeland, Sally Fu, Susannah Leydon-Davis, Maria Masinipeni, Anona Pak, Anna Rankin, Danielle Tahuri, Deborah Yin, Christine Zhang	New Caledonia; Soizick Ho-Yagues, Johanna Kou, Dgenyva Matauli, Cecilia Moussy

=== Individual event ===
The table below gives an overview of the individual event medal winners at the 2016 Oceania Championships.

Event	Gold	Silver	Bronze
Men's singles	(Australia) Ashwant Gobinathan	(French Polynesia) Remi Rossi	(Australia) Anthony Joe
Men's singles	(Australia) Ashwant Gobinathan	(French Polynesia) Remi Rossi	(Australia) Nathan Tang
Women's singles	(Australia) Wendy Chen Hsuan-yu	(Australia) Joy Lai	(Australia) Tiffany Ho
Women's singles	(Australia) Wendy Chen Hsuan-yu	(Australia) Joy Lai	(Australia) Jennifer Tam
Men's doubles	(Australia) Matthew Chau and Sawan Serasinghe	(French Polynesia) Leo Cucuel and Remi Rossi	(Australia) Daniel Fan and Simon Leung
Men's doubles	(Australia) Matthew Chau and Sawan Serasinghe	(French Polynesia) Leo Cucuel and Remi Rossi	(Australia) Anthony Joe and Pit Seng Low
Women's doubles	(Australia) Tiffany Ho and Jennifer Tam	(Australia) Gronya Somerville and Melinda Sun	(French Polynesia) Aurelie Boutin and Chloé Segrestan
Women's doubles	(Australia) Tiffany Ho and Jennifer Tam	(Australia) Gronya Somerville and Melinda Sun	(French Polynesia) Miriau Prununosa and Julie Segrestan
Mixed doubles	(Australia) Robin Middleton and Leanne Choo	(Australia) Anthony Joe and Joy Lai	(French Polynesia) Leo Cucuel and Aurelie Boutin
Mixed doubles	(Australia) Robin Middleton and Leanne Choo	(Australia) Anthony Joe and Joy Lai	(Australia) Simon Leung and Tiffany Ho
