= Léo Cucuel =

Tahitian badminton player and coach (born 1987)

Personal information
- Born: 3 June 1987 (age 39)

Sport
- Country: Tahiti
- Sport: Badminton

Men's singles & doubles
- Highest ranking: 444 (MS 2 September 2011); 152 (MD 22 September 2016); 168 (XD 22 September 2016)
- BWF profile
Medal record
Men's badminton
Representing Tahiti
Oceania Championships
Silver medal – second place	2016 Papeete	Men's doubles
Bronze medal – third place	2016 Papeete	Mixed doubles
Oceania Mixed Team Championships
Bronze medal – third place	2016 Auckland	Mixed team
Oceania Men's Team Championships
Bronze medal – third place	2016 Auckland	Men's team
Bronze medal – third place	2018 Hamilton	Men's team
Bronze medal – third place	2020 Ballarat	Men's team
Bronze medal – third place	2024 Geelong	Men's team
Pacific Mini Games
Gold medal – first place	2022 Saipan	Mixed team
Gold medal – first place	2022 Saipan	Men's doubles

Léo Cucuel (born 3 June 1987) is a Tahitian coach and badminton player.

== Career ==
In 2011, he represented Tahiti at the Pacific Games in Nouméa, New Caledonia. In 2016, he won the silver medal at the Oceania Badminton Championships in the men's doubles event partnered with Rémi Rossi and bronze medal in the mixed team event. He also part of Tahiti team that won the men's team at the Oceania Championships in 2016, 2018, and 2020.

== Achievements ==
=== Oceania Championships ===
Men's doubles
Year	Venue	Partner	Opponent	Score	Result
2016	Punaauia University Hall; Papeete, Tahiti	(French Polynesia) Rémi Rossi	(Australia) Matthew Chau (Australia) Sawan Serasinghe	11–21, 12–21	Silver

Mixed doubles
Year	Venue	Partner	Opponent	Score	Result
2016	Punaauia University Hall; Papeete, Tahiti	(French Polynesia) Aurelie Boutin	(Australia) Robin Middleton (Australia) Leanne Choo	15–21, 4–21	Bronze

=== Pacific Mini Games ===
Men's doubles
Year	Venue	Partner	Opponent	Score	Result
2022	Gilbert C. Ada Gymnasium; Saipan, Northern Mariana Islands	(French Polynesia) Rémi Rossi	(French Polynesia) Glen Le Foll (French Polynesia) Kyliam Scilloux	21–18, 21–8	Gold
