= Jennifer Tam =

Australian badminton player (born 1996)

Jennifer Tam 谭凯匀
Personal information
- Born: Jennifer Hoi-kw Tam; 27 May 1996 (age 30) New South Wales, Australia

Sport
- Country: Australia
- Sport: Badminton
- Handedness: Right

Women's singles &doubles
- Highest ranking: 102 (WS 18 August 2016); 127 (WD 24 March 2016); 169 (XD 22 September 2016)
- BWF profile
Medal record
Women's badminton
Representing Australia
Oceania Championships
Gold medal – first place	2016 Papeete	Women's doubles
Silver medal – second place	2015 North Harbour	Women's doubles
Bronze medal – third place	2015 North Harbour	Women's singles
Bronze medal – third place	2016 Papeete	Women's singles
Bronze medal – third place	2017 Nouméa	Women's singles
Oceania Mixed Team Championships
Gold medal – first place	2019 Melbourne	Mixed team
Oceania Women's Team Championships
Gold medal – first place	2016 Auckland	Women's team
Gold medal – first place	2018 Hamilton	Women's team

Jennifer Hoi-kw Tam (born 27 May 1996) is an Australian badminton player. She won the women's doubles title at the 2016 Oceania Championships partnered with Tiffany Ho. Tam also won the BWF event of Waikato International tournament in the women's doubles event.

== Achievements ==
=== Oceania Championships ===
Women's singles
Year	Venue	Opponent	Score	Result
2017	Salle Anewy; Nouméa, New Caledonia	(Australia) Chen Hsuan-yu	18–21, 12–21	Bronze
2016	Punaauia University Hall; Papeete, Tahiti	(Australia) Chen Hsuan-yu	8–21, 14–21	Bronze
2015	X-TRM North Harbour Badminton Centre; Auckland, New Zealand	(Australia) Chen Hsuan-yu	17–21, 7–21	Bronze'

Women's doubles
Year	Venue	Partner	Opponent	Score	Result
2016	Punaauia University Hall; Papeete, Tahiti	(Australia) Tiffany Ho	(Australia) Gronya Somerville (Australia) Melinda Sun	21–17, 19–21, 22–20	Gold
2015	X-TRM North Harbour Badminton Centre; Auckland, New Zealand	(Australia) Talia Saunders	(Australia) Leanne Choo (Australia) Gronya Somerville	14–21, 11–21	Silver

=== BWF International Challenge/Series ===
Women's doubles
Year	Tournament	Partner	Opponent	Score	Result
2016	Waikato International	(Australia) Tiffany Ho	(New Zealand) Vicki Copeland (New Zealand) Anona Pak	21–19, 18–21, 21–12	(gold) Winner

BWF International Challenge tournament
BWF International Series tournament
BWF Future Series tournament
