= Ada Gym =

Sports venue in Saipan, Northern Mariana Islands

Coordinates: 15.163395°N 145.708930°E

- Ada Gym
- Interactive map of Ada Gym
- Full name: Gilbert C. Ada Gymnasium
- Location: Saipan; Northern Mariana Islands
- Owner: Northern Marianas Sports Association
- Capacity: N/A
- Type: Sport venue
- Surface: Performance surface
- Field shape: square

Construction
- Renovated: 2017

Tenant
- various competitions

Gilbert C. Ada Gymnasium is a multi-purpose sports indoor facility. It is one of the facilities that the Oleai Sports Complex contains. A major renovation project was completed in 2017. It is mostly used for Marianas Soccer League matches.

== Basketball ==
Basketball rounds and events are held here at weekly basis. Saipan was the host city for the 2009 Oceania Basketball Tournament. For that reason the venue was the Gilbert C. Ada Gymnasium. Nonetheless, there was concern over the overall condition of the gym; there was need for ventilation, improved lighting, and other elements.

== Tennis ==
Tennis and its variants are also frequently played at the indoor gym. Australian table tennis player Scott Houston toured schools in Saipan and taught children the fundamentals of it. in Ada Gym for four days.

== Volleyball ==
New volleyballs were supplied from the Northern Marianas Sports Association for the gym so civilians could play volleyball during the open hours. This made a momentous uplift to the sports equipment available.
