= 2015 New Zealand Open Grand Prix Gold =

Tournament details
- Dates: 28 April – 3 May
- Level: Grand Prix Gold
- Total prize money: US$120,000
- Venue: North Shore Events Centre
- Location: Auckland, New Zealand

Champions
- Men's singles: (South Korea) Lee Hyun-il
- Women's singles: (Japan) Saena Kawakami
- Men's doubles: (China) Huang Kaixiang (China) Zheng Siwei
- Women's doubles: (China) Xia Huan (China) Zhong Qianxin
- Mixed doubles: (China) Zheng Siwei (China) Chen Qingchen

The 2015 New Zealand Open Grand Prix Gold was the sixth grand prix gold and grand prix tournament of the 2015 BWF Grand Prix and Grand Prix Gold. The tournament was held in North Shore Events Centre, Auckland, New Zealand between 28 April and 3 May 2015 and had a total purse of $120,000.

== Men's singles ==
=== Seeds ===
1. (Chinese Taipei) Hsu Jen-hao (semi-final)
2. (Hong Kong) Wong Wing Ki (third round)
3. (South Korea) Lee Hyun-il (champion)
4. (Indonesia) Dionysius Hayom Rumbaka (third round)
5. (Hong Kong) Ng Ka Long (quarter-final)
6. (Indonesia) Simon Santoso (first round)
7. (Thailand) Boonsak Ponsana (semi-final)
8. (Singapore) Derek Wong Zi Liang (second round)
9. (Malaysia) Chong Wei Feng (third round)
10. (Malaysia) Zulfadli Zulkiffli (third round)
11. (India) Anand Pawar (third round)
12. (Malaysia) Mohamad Arif Abdul Latif (quarter-final)
13. (United States) Howard Shu (first round)
14. (Malaysia) Liew Daren (withdrew)
15. (Malaysia) Tan Chun Seang (withdrew)
16. (Malaysia) Goh Soon Huat (quarter-final)

=== Finals ===
Quarterfinals
1	(Chinese Taipei) Hsu Jen-hao	21	21
5	(Hong Kong) Ng Ka Long	19	18
3	(South Korea) Lee Hyun-il	16	21	21
(China) Huang Yuxiang	21	18	15
7	(Thailand) Boonsak Ponsana	21	21
16	(Malaysia) Goh Soon Huat	18	13
(China) Qiao Bin	21	21
12	(Malaysia) Mohamad Arif Abdul Latif	15	16

Semifinals
1	(Chinese Taipei) Hsu Jen-hao	13	6
3	(South Korea) Lee Hyun-il	21	21
7	(Thailand) Boonsak Ponsana	18	21	10
(China) Qiao Bin	21	16	21

Final
3	(South Korea) Lee Hyun-il	21	21
(China) Qiao Bin	12	14

=== Top half ===
==== Section 1 ====
First Round
1	(Chinese Taipei) Hsu J-h	21	21
Q3	(New Zealand) C Steeghs	9	9
(Australia) M Fariman	21	13	19
(Malaysia) Yeoh SZ	19	21	21
9	(Malaysia) Chong WF	21	21
(New Zealand) M Phillips	9	9
(New Zealand) D Soedjasa	21	21
Q8	(New Zealand) B Hillier	5	15

Second Round
1	(Chinese Taipei) Hsu J-h	24	21
(Malaysia) Yeoh SZ	22	12
9	(Malaysia) Chong WF	21	21
(New Zealand) D Soedjasa	8	10

Third Round
1	(Chinese Taipei) Hsu J-h	21	6	21
9	(Malaysia) Chong WF	16	21	18

==== Section 2 ====
First Round
5	(Hong Kong) Ng KL	21	21
(Malaysia) I Zainuddin	15	14
(China) Zhou ZQ	16	21	21
(Australia) A Gobinathan	21	8	14
13	(United States) H Shu	21	18	20
Q6	(Indonesia) S Rhustavito	15	21	22
PFQ	(New Zealand) D Henton	10	10
(South Africa) J Maliekal	21	21

Second Round
5	(Hong Kong) Ng KL	21	21
(China) Zhou ZQ	15	12
Q6	(Indonesia) S Rhustavito	21	21
(South Africa) J Maliekal	14	8

Third Round
5	(Hong Kong) Ng KL	21	21
Q6	(Indonesia) S Rhustavito	15	18

==== Section 3 ====
First Round
3	(South Korea) Lee H-i	21	21
Q4	(New Zealand) A Rouse	8	3
(Indonesia) K Alexander	17	21	20
(Malaysia) Ai WJ	21	16	22
11	(India) A Pawar	21	21
PFQ	(New Zealand) J Curry	5	9
(Malaysia) Zh Zulkiffli	21	21
(New Zealand) B Matheson	16	13

Second Round
3	(South Korea) Lee H-i	21	21
(Malaysia) Ai WJ	8	14
11	(India) A Pawar	21	21
(Malaysia) Zh Zulkiffli	11	17

Third Round
3	(South Korea) Lee H-i	21	21
11	(India) A Pawar	14	7

==== Section 4 ====
First Round
6	(Indonesia) S Santoso	12	9
(China) Lin GP	21	21
(Australia) J Eunson	21	21
(New Zealand) C Harfield	9	12
PFQ	(New Zealand) T Fang	14	8
(Indonesia) N Sulistyo	21	21
(Japan) Y Yamaguchi	15	15
(China) Huang YX	21	21

Second Round
(China) Lin GP	21	21
(Australia) J Eunson	10	12
(Indonesia) N Sulistyo	11	12
(China) Huang YX	21	21

Third Round
(China) Lin GP	17	21	16
(China) Huang YX	21	19	21

=== Bottom half ===
==== Section 5 ====
First Round
(Australia) P Low	21	21
(New Zealand) K Palmer	9	10
(Australia) A Ng	15	4
PFQ	(Australia) C Chen	21	21
(New Zealand) J Curtin	16	8
(Malaysia) Shia CK	21	21
Q1	(New Zealand) H Jin	5	3
7	(Thailand) B Ponsana	21	21

Second Round
(Australia) P Low	21	21
PFQ	(Australia) C Chen	12	15
(Malaysia) Shia CK	11	11
7	(Thailand) B Ponsana	21	21

Third Round
(Australia) P Low	5	10
7	(Thailand) B Ponsana	21	21

==== Section 6 ====
First Round
(Chinese Taipei) Hsueh H-y	21	21
(Malaysia) Chen TJ	13	19
(China) Guo K	16	21	16
16	(Malaysia) Goh SH	21	16	21
(Japan) H Shimono	21	21
PFQ	(Indonesia) J Arbitamaj	5	9
(New Zealand) A Manota	13	14
4	(Indonesia) D Rumbaka	21	21

Second Round
(Chinese Taipei) Hsueh H-y	21	22	19
16	(Malaysia) Goh SH	15	24	21
(Japan) H Shimono	6	15
4	(Indonesia) D Rumbaka	21	21

Third Round
16	(Malaysia) Goh SH	21	21
4	(Indonesia) D Rumbaka	17	17

==== Section 7 ====
First Round
(Indonesia) A Susanto	12	16
(Malaysia) Tan VH	21	21
(New Zealand) M He	7	14
10	(Malaysia) Zf Zulkiffli	21	21
(Australia) S Leung	6	8
(China) Qiao B	21	21
Q2	(New Zealand) T Weistra	18	6
8	(Singapore) D Wong	21	21

Second Round
(Malaysia) Tan VH	9	11
10	(Malaysia) Zf Zulkiffli	21	21
(China) Qiao B	21	21
8	(Singapore) D Wong	14	18

Third Round
10	(Malaysia) Zf Zulkiffli	7	26	14
(China) Qiao B	21	24	21

==== Section 8 ====
First Round
(Malaysia) J Wong	12	21	10
Q5	(Malaysia) Tan TH	21	18	21
(Indonesia) E Sukamta	9	18
12	(Malaysia) A Abdul Latif	21	21
Q7	(New Zealand) N Tagle	10	10
(Australia) D Guda	21	21
(Indonesia) W Prasetyo	13	8
2	(Hong Kong) Wong WK	21	21

Second Round
(Malaysia) Tan TH	11	12
12	(Malaysia) A Abdul Latif	21	21
(Australia) D Guda	12	8
2	(Hong Kong) Wong WK	21	21

Third Round
12	(Malaysia) A Abdul Latif	21	14	22
2	(Hong Kong) Wong WK	17	21	20

== Women's singles ==
=== Seeds ===
1. (Indonesia) Adriyanti Firdasari (withdrew)
2. (Singapore) Chen Jiayuan (second round)
3. (United States) Iris Wang (withdrew)
4. (Indonesia) Maria Febe Kusumastuti (quarter-final)
5. (Hong Kong) Cheung Ngan Yi (semi-final)
6. (Turkey) Neslihan Yigit (withdrew)
7. (Turkey) Ozge Bayrak (withdrew)
8. (Japan) Aya Ohori (semi-final)

=== Finals ===
Semifinals
(China) He Bingjiao	21	21
8	(Japan) Aya Ohori	17	15
5	(Hong Kong) Cheung Ngan Yi	10	21	15
Q3	(Japan) Saena Kawakami	21	15	21

Final
(China) He Bingjiao	16	18
Q3	(Japan) Saena Kawakami	21	21

=== Top half ===
==== Section 1 ====
First Round
PFQ	(New Zealand) G Galvez	5	10
(Malaysia) J Wong	21	21
(Malaysia) Ho YM	19	16
(China) He BJ	21	21
PFQ	(Japan) N Nidaira	21	21
Q4	(New Zealand) T Otene	3	5
(New Zealand) A Derby	16	10
(Australia) T Ho	21	21

Second Round
(Malaysia) J Wong	10	13
(China) He BJ	21	21
PFQ	(Japan) N Nidaira	21	21
(Australia) T Ho	8	6

Quarterfinals
(China) He BJ	21	22
PFQ	(Japan) N Nidaira	19	20

==== Section 2 ====
First Round
PFQ	(China) Li Y	21	21
(Singapore) Liang XY	18	14
Q1	(New Zealand) S Fu	11	8
(Malaysia) Lim YF	21	21
8	(Japan) A Ohori	21	21
(Indonesia) R Hartawan	12	13
(Australia) J Lai	21	18	11
(Malaysia) Lim CS	17	21	21

Second Round
PFQ	(China) Li Y	21	21
(Malaysia) Lim YF	15	16
8	(Japan) A Ohori	21	21
(Malaysia) Lim CS	10	14

Quarterfinals
PFQ	(China) Li Y	21	18	11
8	(Japan) A Ohori	15	21	21

=== Bottom half ===
==== Section 3 ====
First Round
(China) Chen YF	21	21
(Sweden) B Pirzamanbein	2	6
(Australia) R Serasinghe	7	7
5	(Hong Kong) Cheung NY	21	21
(Chinese Taipei) Hung S-h	21	21
PFQ	(New Zealand) V Copeland	7	15
PFQ	(New Zealand) S Lee	9	8
4	(Indonesia) M Kusumastuti	21	21

Second Round
(China) Chen YF	22	20	19
5	(Hong Kong) Cheung NY	20	22	21
(Chinese Taipei) Hung S-h	10	14
4	(Indonesia) M Kusumastuti	21	21

Quarterfinals
5	(Hong Kong) Cheung NY	15	21	21
4	(Indonesia) M Kusumastuti	21	19	11

==== Section 4 ====
First Round
Q2	(New Zealand) C Rozario	10	13
(Australia) W Chen	21	21
(Australia) A Wu	21	21
PFQ	(New Zealand) R Goddard	10	12
Q3	(Japan) S Kawakami	21	21
PFQ	(Germany) A Horbach	7	3
(Australia) J Tam	7	12
2	(Singapore) Chen JY	21	21

Second Round
(Australia) W Chen	21	21
(Australia) A Wu	9	13
Q3	(Japan) S Kawakami	21	21
2	(Singapore) Chen JY	15	14

Quarterfinals
(Australia) W Chen	16	11
Q3	(Japan) S Kawakami	21	21

== Men's doubles ==
=== Seeds ===
1. (Singapore) Danny Bawa Chrisnanta / Chayut Triyachart (first round)
2. (Indonesia) Andrei Adistia / Hendra Aprida Gunawan (first round)
3. (China) Li Junhui / Liu Yuchen (quarter-final)
4. (Germany) Raphael Beck / Andreas Heinz (second round)
5. (Malaysia) Goh V Shem / Tan Wee Kiong (quarter-final)
6. (Malaysia) Hoon Thien How / Lim Khim Wah (semi-final)
7. (Indonesia) Fajar Alfian / Muhammad Rian Ardianto (final)
8. (Indonesia) Berry Angriawan / Rian Agung Saputro (second round)

=== Finals ===
Semifinals
7	(Indonesia) Fajar Alfian (Indonesia) Muhammad Rian Ardianto	21	21
6	(Malaysia) Hoon Thien How (Malaysia) Lim Khim Wah	15	18
(Indonesia) Markis Kido (Indonesia) Agripinna Prima Rahmanto Putra	7	16
(China) Huang Kaixiang (China) Zheng Siwei	21	21

Final
7	(Indonesia) Fajar Alfian (Indonesia) Muhammad Rian Ardianto	21	17	9
(China) Huang Kaixiang (China) Zheng Siwei	16	21	21

=== Top half ===
==== Section 1 ====
First Round
1	(Singapore) D Chrisnanta (Singapore) C Triyachart	16	27	18
(Thailand) K Ketlen (Thailand) D Puavaranukroh	21	25	21
(Malaysia) J Wong (Malaysia) Chen TJ	18	11
Q4	(Netherlands) R Bosch (Chinese Taipei) Huang P-j	21	21
7	(Indonesia) F Alfian (Indonesia) R Ardianto	21	21
(New Zealand) K Dennerly-Minturn (Australia) R Middleton	12	14
(Denmark) S Gravholt (Denmark) N Overgaard	21	21
(New Zealand) M He (New Zealand) K Palmer	6	9

Second Round
(Thailand) K Ketlen (Thailand) D Puavaranukroh	17	10
Q4	(Netherlands) R Bosch (Chinese Taipei) Huang P-j	21	21
7	(Indonesia) F Alfian (Indonesia) R Ardianto	18	21	21
(Denmark) S Gravholt (Denmark) N Overgaard	21	17	14

Quarterfinals
Q4	(Netherlands) R Bosch (Chinese Taipei) Huang P-j	21	21	18
7	(Indonesia) F Alfian (Indonesia) R Ardianto	19	23	21

==== Section 2 ====
First Round
3	(China) Li JH (China) Liu YC	21	21
(Indonesia) Hardianto (Indonesia) K Haryanto	10	15
(Australia) M Chau (Australia) S Serasinghe	21	21
(Malaysia) Chen JH (Malaysia) Shia CK	19	14
6	(Malaysia) Hoon TH (Malaysia) Lim KW	21	21
Q3	(New Zealand) C Harfield (New Zealand) V Sulaiman	8	6
Q2	(Japan) K Matsui (Japan) K Miura	21	21
Q1	(Indonesia) K Alexander (Indonesia) N Sulistyo	15	10

Second Round
3	(China) Li JH (China) Liu YC	21	21
(Australia) M Chau (Australia) S Serasinghe	8	11
6	(Malaysia) Hoon TH (Malaysia) Lim KW	21	21
Q2	(Japan) K Matsui (Japan) K Miura	16	16

Quarterfinals
3	(China) Li JH (China) Liu YC	15	21	19
6	(Malaysia) Hoon TH (Malaysia) Lim KW	21	14	21

=== Bottom half ===
==== Section 3 ====
First Round
(China) He JT (China) Yu XY	21	21
(South Korea) Lee J-j (New Zealand) O Leydon-Davis	16	15
(New Zealand) A Manota (New Zealand) D Soedjasa	13	14
5	(Malaysia) Goh VS (Malaysia) Tan WK	21	21
(Australia) C Chen (Australia) M Fariman	8	10
(Indonesia) M Kido (Indonesia) A Putra	21	21
(Indonesia) R Sugiarto (Indonesia) A Wirawan	16	18
4	(Germany) R Beck (Germany) A Heinz	21	21

Second Round
(China) He JT (China) Yu XY	11	14
5	(Malaysia) Goh VS (Malaysia) Tan WK	21	21
(Indonesia) M Kido (Indonesia) A Putra	21	21
4	(Germany) R Beck (Germany) A Heinz	18	16

Quarterfinals
5	(Malaysia) Goh VS (Malaysia) Tan WK	20	13
(Indonesia) M Kido (Indonesia) A Putra	22	21

==== Section 4 ====
First Round
(Chinese Taipei) Lu C-y (Chinese Taipei) Tien T-c	21	21
(Australia) S Leung (Australia) P Low	14	5
PFQ	(New Zealand) J Curtin (New Zealand) D Oud	13	11
8	(Indonesia) B Angriawan (Indonesia) R Saputro	21	21
(Thailand) B Issara (Thailand) N Puangpuapech	21	15	21
(Malaysia) Mak HC (Malaysia) Teo KS	14	21	18
(China) Huang KX (China) Zheng SW	21	20	21
2	(Indonesia) A Adistia (Indonesia) H Gunawan	14	22	18

Second Round
(Chinese Taipei) Lu C-y (Chinese Taipei) Tien T-c	21	15	21
8	(Indonesia) B Angriawan (Indonesia) R Saputro	18	21	16
(Thailand) B Issara (Thailand) N Puangpuapech	18	18
(China) Huang KX (China) Zheng SW	21	21

Quarterfinals
(Chinese Taipei) Lu C-y (Chinese Taipei) Tien T-c	10	8
(China) Huang KX (China) Zheng SW	21	21

== Women's doubles ==
=== Seeds ===
1. (Indonesia) Pia Zebadiah Bernadeth / Rizki Amelia Pradipta (quarter-final)
2. (Turkey) Ozge Bayrak / Neslihan Yigit (second round)
3. (Japan) Yuki Fukushima / Sayaka Hirota (final)
4. (China) Xia Huan / Zhong Qianxin (champion)

=== Finals ===
Semifinals
(Japan) Shiho Tanaka (Japan) Koharu Yonemoto	18	15
3	(Japan) Yuki Fukushima (Japan) Sayaka Hirota	21	21
4	(China) Xia Huan (China) Zhong Qianxin	21	21
(Indonesia) Komala Dewi (Indonesia) Vita Marissa	14	11

Final
3	(Japan) Yuki Fukushima (Japan) Sayaka Hirota	21	22	19
4	(China) Xia Huan (China) Zhong Qianxin	17	24	21

=== Top half ===
==== Section 1 ====
First Round
1	(Indonesia) P Bernadeth (Indonesia) R Pradipta
BYE
(Germany) A Horbach (New Zealand) M Masinipeni	21	21
(New Zealand) S Fu (New Zealand) C Zhang	11	16
(Australia) W Chen (Australia) G Somerville
BYE
(New Zealand) E Chapple (New Zealand) D Tahuri	5	12
(Japan) S Tanaka (Japan) K Yonemoto	21	21

Second Round
1	(Indonesia) P Bernadeth (Indonesia) R Pradipta	21	21
(Germany) A Horbach (New Zealand) M Masinipeni	5	8
(Australia) W Chen (Australia) G Somerville	15	18
(Japan) S Tanaka (Japan) K Yonemoto	21	21

Quarterfinals
1	(Indonesia) P Bernadeth (Indonesia) R Pradipta	27	22	15
(Japan) S Tanaka (Japan) K Yonemoto	25	24	21

==== Section 2 ====
First Round
3	(Japan) Y Fukushima (Japan) S Hirota
BYE
(Indonesia) A Awanda (Indonesia) K Istirani	wo
(China) Chen QC (China) Jia YF
(New Zealand) E Calder-Hawkins (New Zealand) S Wu
BYE
(Chinese Taipei) Cheng W-h (Chinese Taipei) Shaui P-l	21	21
(New Zealand) G Galvez (New Zealand) T Otene	6	7

Second Round
3	(Japan) Y Fukushima (Japan) S Hirota	21	21
(China) Chen QC (China) Jia YF	15	19
(New Zealand) E Calder-Hawkins (New Zealand) S Wu	4	5
(Chinese Taipei) Cheng W-h (Chinese Taipei) Shaui P-l	21	21

Quarterfinals
3	(Japan) Y Fukushima (Japan) S Hirota	22	21
(Chinese Taipei) Cheng W-h (Chinese Taipei) Shaui P-l	20	17

=== Bottom half ===
==== Section 3 ====
First Round
(Australia) T Ho (New Zealand) A Leung	17	21	23
(New Zealand) V Copeland (New Zealand) A Pak	21	13	21
(New Zealand) K Stern (New Zealand) J Villegas	13	13
(Australia) J Tam (Australia) A Wu	21	21
(Singapore) V Neo (Singapore) S Sari	14	19
(Indonesia) M Oklamona (Indonesia) M Sahputri	21	21
BYE
4	(China) Xia H (China) Zhong QX

Second Round
(Australia) T Ho (New Zealand) A Leung	26	13
(Australia) J Tam (Australia) A Wu	28	21
(Indonesia) M Oklamona (Indonesia) M Sahputri	17	12
4	(China) Xia H (China) Zhong QX	21	21

Quarterfinals
(Australia) J Tam (Australia) A Wu	8	7
4	(China) Xia H (China) Zhong QX	21	21

==== Section 4 ====
First Round
(New Zealand) A Derby (New Zealand) R Goddard	9	11
(Indonesia) K Dewi (Indonesia) V Marissa	21	21
BYE
(New Zealand) S Lee (New Zealand) K Luo
(Japan) R Etoh (Japan) A Matsuda	wo
(Australia) L Choo (Australia) S Mapasa
BYE
2	(Turkey) O Bayrak (Turkey) N Yigit

Second Round
(Indonesia) K Dewi (Indonesia) V Marissa	21	21
(New Zealand) S Lee (New Zealand) K Luo	16	10
(Australia) L Choo (Australia) S Mapasa	21	21
2	(Turkey) O Bayrak (Turkey) N Yigit	7	10

Quarterfinals
(Indonesia) K Dewi (Indonesia) V Marissa	21	21
(Australia) L Choo (Australia) S Mapasa	17	14

== Mixed doubles ==
=== Seeds ===
1. (Indonesia) Riky Widianto / Richi Puspita Dili (semi-final)
2. (Singapore) Danny Bawa Chrisnanta / Vanessa Neo Yu Yan (first round)
3. (Indonesia) Markis Kido / Pia Zebadiah Bernadeth (semi-final)
4. (Indonesia) Ronald Alexander / Melati Daeva Oktaviani (second round)
5. (China) Zheng Siwei / Chen Qingchen (champion)
6. (China) Huang Kaixiang / Zhong Qianxin (second round)
7. (Indonesia) Fran Kurniawan / Komala Dewi (quarter-final)
8. (Singapore) Chayut Triyachart / Shinta Mulia Sari (quarter-final)

=== Finals ===
Semifinals
1	(Indonesia) Riky Widianto (Indonesia) Richi Puspita Dili	18	22	11
5	(China) Zheng Siwei (China) Chen Qingchen	21	20	21
3	(Indonesia) Markis Kido (Indonesia) Pia Zebadiah Bernadeth	15	13
(China) Yu Xiaoyu (China) Xia Huan	21	21

Final
5	(China) Zheng Siwei (China) Chen Qingchen	21	21
(China) Yu Xiaoyu (China) Xia Huan	14	8

=== Top half ===
==== Section 1 ====
First Round
1	(Indonesia) R Widianto (Indonesia) R Dili	21	20	21
(Australia) R Middleton (Australia) L Choo	17	22	17
(Australia) M Chau (Australia) G Somerville	21	21
(New Zealand) J Wu (Chinese Taipei) Hung S-h	17	15
8	(Singapore) C Triyachart (Singapore) S Sari	24	21
(Indonesia) A Putra (Indonesia) R Pradipta	22	19
PFQ	(Australia) S Leung (Australia) T Ho	16	21	17
(Germany) A Heinz (Germany) A Horbach	21	18	21

Second Round
1	(Indonesia) R Widianto (Indonesia) R Dili	21	21
(Australia) M Chau (Australia) G Somerville	10	10
8	(Singapore) C Triyachart (Singapore) S Sari	21	21
(Germany) A Heinz (Germany) A Horbach	9	11

Quarterfinals
1	(Indonesia) R Widianto (Indonesia) R Dili	21	21
8	(Singapore) C Triyachart (Singapore) S Sari	14	19

==== Section 2 ====
First Round
4	(Indonesia) R Alexander (Indonesia) M Oktaviani	21	21
(New Zealand) B Matheson (New Zealand) A Leung	13	17
(Chinese Taipei) Lu C-y (Chinese Taipei) Cheng W-h	21	21
(New Zealand) S Masinipeni (New Zealand) M Masinipeni	8	8
5	(China) Zheng SW (China) Chen QC	21	21
Q2	(Indonesia) A Prasetya (Indonesia) S Aulia	16	17
Q4	(New Zealand) A Manota (India) R Sahdev	21	17	21
Q3	(Australia) D Guda (Australia) J Lai	14	21	19

Second Round
4	(Indonesia) R Alexander (Indonesia) M Oktaviani	14	12
(Chinese Taipei) Lu C-y (Chinese Taipei) Cheng W-h	21	21
5	(China) Zheng SW (China) Chen QC	21	21
Q4	(New Zealand) A Manota (India) R Sahdev	7	10

Quarterfinals
(Chinese Taipei) Lu C-y (Chinese Taipei) Cheng W-h	8	19
5	(China) Zheng SW (China) Chen QC	21	21

=== Bottom half ===
==== Section 3 ====
First Round
(India) T Kona (India) S Reddy	14	8
(Malaysia) Chan PS (Malaysia) Goh LY	21	21
(Australia) S Serasinghe (Australia) S Mapasa	14	12
7	(Indonesia) F Kurniawan (Indonesia) K Dewi	21	21
(Australia) A Ng (Australia) R Serasinghe	4	4
(Japan) K Miura (Japan) K Yonemoto	21	21
(China) He JT (China) Jia YF	10	17
3	(Indonesia) M Kido (Indonesia) P Bernadeth	21	21

Second Round
(Malaysia) Chan PS (Malaysia) Goh LY	21	21	14
7	(Indonesia) F Kurniawan (Indonesia) K Dewi	14	23	21
(Japan) K Miura (Japan) K Yonemoto	20	13
3	(Indonesia) M Kido (Indonesia) P Bernadeth	22	21

Quarterfinals
7	(Indonesia) F Kurniawan (Indonesia) K Dewi	22	11
3	(Indonesia) M Kido (Indonesia) P Bernadeth	24	21

==== Section 4 ====
First Round
(New Zealand) K Dennerly-Minturn (New Zealand) D Tahuri	10	17
(Indonesia) A Adistia (Indonesia) V Marissa	21	21
(Chinese Taipei) Huang P-j (Chinese Taipei) Shuai P-l	20	17
6	(China) Huang KX (China) Zhong QX	22	21
(New Zealand) M Phillips (New Zealand) A Pak	21	21
Q1	(New Zealand) B Hillier (New Zealand) S Wu	17	13
(China) Yu XY (China) Xia H	21	21
2	(Singapore) D Chrisnanta (Singapore) V Neo	19	12

Second Round
(Indonesia) A Adistia (Indonesia) V Marissa	21	16	21
6	(China) Huang KX (China) Zhong QX	17	21	12
(New Zealand) M Phillips (New Zealand) A Pak	5	6
(China) Yu XY (China) Xia H	21	21

Quarterfinals
(Indonesia) A Adistia (Indonesia) V Marissa	21	13	15
(China) Yu XY (China) Xia H	18	21	21

Preceded by 2015 China Masters Grand Prix Gold	BWF Grand Prix and Grand Prix Gold; 2015 BWF Season	Succeeded by 2015 U.S. Open Grand Prix Gold
