= 2013 New Zealand Open Grand Prix =

Tournament details
- Dates: April 10, 2013 - April 14, 2013
- Total prize money: US$50,000
- Venue: North Shore Events Centre
- Location: Auckland, New Zealand

The 2013 New Zealand Open Grand Prix was the fourth grand prix gold and grand prix tournament of the 2013 BWF Grand Prix Gold and Grand Prix. The tournament was held in North Shore Events Centre, Auckland, New Zealand April 10 until April 14, 2013 and had a total purse of $50,000.

== Men's singles ==
=== Seeds ===
1. (Indonesia) Simon Santoso (quarter-final)
2. (Chinese Taipei) Hsu Jen-hao (semi-final)
3. (India) Ajay Jayaram (quarter-final)
4. (India) Rajah Menuri Venkata Gurusaidutt (second round)
5. (India) Anand Pawar (second round)
6. (Indonesia) Andre Kurniawan Tedjono (third round)
7. (Indonesia) Wisnu Yuli Prasetyo (third round)
8. (Malaysia) Zulfadli Zulkiffli (withdrew)
9. (Czech Republic) Petr Koukal (withdrew)
10. (Indonesia) Riyanto Subagja (second round)
11. (Japan) Riichi Takeshita (champion)
12. (South Korea) Hong Ji-hoon (third round)
13. (India) Arvind Bhat (quarter-final)
14. (India) Chetan Anand (second round)
15. (China) Qiao Bin (first round)
16. (South Korea) Park Sung-min (third round)

=== Finals ===
Quarterfinals
1	(Indonesia) Simon Santoso	19	21	18
(South Korea) Lee Dong-keun	21	13	21
3	(India) Ajay Jayaram	12	10^{r}
(China) Xue Song	21	15
(Chinese Taipei) Wan Chia-hsin	21	14	15
11	(Japan) Riichi Takeshita	13	21	21
13	(India) Arvind Bhat	6	17
2	(Chinese Taipei) Hsu Jen-hao	21	21

Semifinals
(South Korea) Lee Dong-keun	16	21	15
(China) Xue Song	21	16	21
11	(Japan) Riichi Takeshita	23	21
2	(Chinese Taipei) Hsu Jen-hao	21	7

Final
(China) Xue Song	16	21	17
11	(Japan) Riichi Takeshita	21	16	21

=== Top half ===
==== Section 1 ====
First Round
1	(Indonesia) S Santoso	21	21
(Chinese Taipei) Lin Y-h	17	15
(Indonesia) A Ramadhan	21	21
(New Zealand) B Matheson	13	7
14	(India) C Anand	21	21
(New Zealand) A Richardson	10	16
(Thailand) P Thongnuam	20	21	21
(Malaysia) K Yogendran	22	19	15

Second Round
1	(Indonesia) S Santoso	21	21
(Indonesia) A Ramadhan	9	14
14	(India) C Anand	21	17	12
(Thailand) P Thongnuam	17	21	21

Third Round
1	(Indonesia) S Santoso	20	21	21
(Thailand) P Thongnuam	22	17	17

==== Section 2 ====
First Round
PFQ	(New Zealand) J Curtin	16	14
(New Zealand) J Eunson	21	21
(South Korea) Lee D-k	21	21
Q7	(Japan) K Nishimoto	15	13
10	(Indonesia) R Subagja	21	21
(Australia) N Tang	11	10
(Indonesia) E Sukamta	21	21
(New Zealand) S Ho	18	9

Second Round
(New Zealand) J Eunson	4	12
(South Korea) Lee D-k	21	21
10	(Indonesia) R Subagja	20	23	18
(Indonesia) E Sukamta	22	21	21

Third Round
(South Korea) Lee D-k	17	21	21
(Indonesia) E Sukamta	21	16	11

==== Section 3 ====
First Round
3	(India) A Jayaram	21	21
(Malaysia) W Neo	5	20
(New Zealand) K Palmer	9	10
(Norway) M Myhre	21	21
12	(South Korea) Hong J-h	21	21
(New Zealand) H Chou	9	9
(Australia) Low PS	5	7
(Malaysia) Bong GY	21	21

Second Round
3	(India) A Jayaram	24	21
(Norway) M Myhre	22	5
12	(South Korea) Hong J-h	21	21
(Malaysia) Bong GY	12	11

Third Round
3	(India) A Jayaram	14	28	21
12	(South Korea) Hong J-h	21	26	13

==== Section 4 ====
First Round
7	(Indonesia) W Prasetyo	21	21	21
(Malaysia) Chan KB	18	23	16
(New Zealand) M Phillips
Q1	(New Zealand) E Pike	wo
15	(China) Qiao B	14	18
Q2	(South Korea) Hwang J-s	21	21
(New Zealand) V Washington	3	4
Q5	(China) Xue S	21	21

Second Round
7	(Indonesia) W Prasetyo	21	21
(New Zealand) M Phillips	6	11
Q2	(South Korea) Hwang J-s	25	16
Q5	(China) Xue S	27	21

Third Round
7	(Indonesia) W Prasetyo	12	22	11
Q5	(China) Xue S	21	20	21

=== Bottom half ===
==== Section 5 ====
First Round
(Norway) J Christensen	21	21
(New Zealand) T Ellis	12	18
(Chinese Taipei) Cheng P-w	21	21
PFQ	(New Zealand) D Henton	8	7
(Chinese Taipei) Wan C-h	21	21
(New Zealand) M Fowke	11	15
(China) Tian HW	15	19
5	(India) A Pawar	21	21

Second Round
(Norway) J Christensen	19	9
(Chinese Taipei) Cheng P-w	21	21
(Chinese Taipei) Wan C-h	21	21
5	(India) A Pawar	16	14

Third Round
(Chinese Taipei) Cheng P-w	18	18
(Chinese Taipei) Wan C-h	21	21

==== Section 6 ====
First Round
(Malaysia) Chong KH	18	21	21
(Thailand) A Namkul	21	17	17
(New Zealand) T Weistra	16	9
11	(Japan) R Takeshita	21	21
(Malaysia) B Wong	21	21
(New Zealand) Yang J	14	15
Q8	(New Zealand) C Cheng	15	7
4	(India) R Gurusaidutt	21	21

Second Round
(Malaysia) Chong KH	10	8
11	(Japan) R Takeshita	21	21
(Malaysia) B Wong	21	13	21
4	(India) R Gurusaidutt	18	21	19

Third Round
11	(Japan) R Takeshita	21	21
(Malaysia) B Wong	8	13

==== Section 7 ====
First Round
(New Zealand) T Fang	10	11
Q4	(India) K Dhindhwal	21	21
(Malaysia) Lim YF	9	13
13	(India) A Bhat	21	21
(New Zealand) L Charlesworth	10	11
(China) Guo K	21	21
Q6	(Malaysia) Tan VH	10	15
6	(Indonesia) A Tedjono	21	21

Second Round
Q4	(India) K Dhindhwal	16	12
13	(India) A Bhat	21	21
(China) Guo K	20	19
6	(Indonesia) A Tedjono	22	21

Third Round
13	(India) A Bhat	21	21
6	(Indonesia) A Tedjono	19	10

==== Section 8 ====
First Round
(Trinidad and Tobago) N Bonkowsky	6	10
(Malaysia) Chiang JS	21	21
(Australia) M Fariman	10	14
16	(South Korea) Park S-m	21	21
(Malaysia) Kuan BH	21	21
(New Zealand) J Wu	16	19
Q3	(Malaysia) I Wong	9	11
2	(Chinese Taipei) Hsu J-h	21	21

Second Round
(Malaysia) Chiang JS	15	16
16	(South Korea) Park S-m	21	21
(Malaysia) Kuan BH	21	8	15
2	(Chinese Taipei) Hsu J-h	14	21	21

Third Round
16	(South Korea) Park S-m	20	14
2	(Chinese Taipei) Hsu J-h	22	21

== Women's singles ==
=== Seeds ===
1. (Chinese Taipei) Pai Hsiao-ma (quarter-final)
2. (Japan) Kaori Imabeppu (second round)
3. (China) Deng Xuan (champion)
4. (Indonesia) Yeni Asmarani (second round)
5. (Indonesia) Maziyyah Nadhir (first round)
6. (China) Yao Xue (semi-final)
7. (Indonesia) Renna Suwarno (second round)
8. (Indonesia) Milicent Wiranto (second round)

=== Finals ===
Semifinals
6	(China) Yao Xue	16	21	18
(Japan) Akane Yamaguchi	21	14	21
3	(China) Deng Xuan	21	18	21
(South Korea) Kang Hae-won	18	21	18

Final
(Japan) Akane Yamaguchi	17	21	20
3	(China) Deng Xuan	21	18	22

=== Top half ===
==== Section 1 ====
First Round
1	(Chinese Taipei) Pai H-m	21	25
(Thailand) R Prajongjai	12	23
(India) S Jasti	21	17	17
Q4	(New Zealand) V Copeland	18	21	21
6	(China) Yao X	21	21
(New Caledonia) M Bravo	6	4
Q3	(Australia) V Kessler	21	21
(New Zealand) K Stern	11	10

Second Round
1	(Chinese Taipei) Pai H-m	21	21
Q4	(New Zealand) V Copeland	11	5
6	(China) Yao X	21	21
Q3	(Australia) V Kessler	10	9

Quarterfinals
1	(Chinese Taipei) Pai H-m	10	21	10
6	(China) Yao X	21	16	21

==== Section 2 ====
First Round
4	(Indonesia) Y Asmarani	21	21
(New Zealand) R Devathasan	7	6
(Australia) T Pilven	16	11
(Japan) A Yamaguchi	21	21
7	(Indonesia) R Suwarno	21	21
(Australia) A Wu	11	18
(New Zealand) A Rankin	2	11
(Japan) A Mine	21	21

Second Round
4	(Indonesia) Y Asmarani	13	18
(Japan) A Yamaguchi	21	21
7	(Indonesia) R Suwarno	15	18
(Japan) A Mine	21	21

Quarterfinals
(Japan) A Yamaguchi	21	21
(Japan) A Mine	18	19

=== Bottom half ===
==== Section 3 ====
First Round
(Australia) J Lai	8	11
(China) Hui XR	21	21
(China) Suo D	21	21
5	(Indonesia) M Nadhir	18	7
(Thailand) P Chochuwong	21	21
Q2	(Australia) V Mak	8	12
(New Zealand) A Pak	5	3
3	(China) Deng X	21	21

Second Round
(China) Hui XR	15	13
(China) Suo D	21	21
(Thailand) P Chochuwong	10	14
3	(China) Deng X	21	21

Quarterfinals
(China) Suo D	15	17
3	(China) Deng X	21	21

==== Section 4 ====
First Round
(Thailand) A Sapniti	21	21
(Australia) Lee JY	9	13
PFQ	(Australia) N Sharp	14	12
8	(Indonesia) M Wiranto	21	21
(South Korea) Kang H-w	21	21
Q1	(Australia) G Ngiam	12	5
(Chinese Taipei) Cheng C-y	12	15
2	(Japan) K Imabeppu	21	21

Second Round
(Thailand) A Sapniti	21	18	21
8	(Indonesia) M Wiranto	15	21	17
(South Korea) Kang H-w	15	21	21
2	(Japan) K Imabeppu	21	9	15

Quarterfinals
(Thailand) A Sapniti	14	13
(South Korea) Kang H-w	21	21

== Men's doubles ==
=== Seeds ===
1. (Indonesia) Angga Pratama / Rian Agung Saputro (champion)
2. (Malaysia) Goh V Shem / Lim Khim Wah (second round)
3. (Malaysia) Mohd Zakry Abdul Latif / Mohd Fairuzizuan Mohd Tazari (second round)
4. (Malaysia) Gan Teik Chai / Ong Soon Hock (first round)
5. (Indonesia) Ricky Karanda Suwardi / Muhammad Ulinnuha (second round)
6. (Chinese Taipei) Chen Hung-ling / Lu Chia-bin (quarter-final)
7. (South Korea) Kim Dae-eun / Shin Baek-cheol (second round)
8. (Malaysia) Chooi Kah Ming / Ow Yao Han (quarter-final)

=== Finals ===
Semifinals
1	(Indonesia) Angga Pratama (Indonesia) Rian Agung Saputro	21	21
(Indonesia) Bona Septano (Indonesia) Afiat Yuris Wirawan	15	11
(Indonesia) Berry Angriawan (Indonesia) Yohanes Rendy Sugiarto	14	21	16
(China) Li Junhui (China) Liu Yuchen	21	17	21

Final
1	(Indonesia) Angga Pratama (Indonesia) Rian Agung Saputro	21	22
(China) Li Junhui (China) Liu Yuchen	6	20

=== Top half ===
==== Section 1 ====
First Round
1	(Indonesia) A Pratama (Indonesia) R Saputro	21	21
Q1	(China) Huang KX (China) Tao JQ	12	15
(Japan) T Inoue (Japan) Y Kaneko	21	21
Q4	(New Zealand) K Lee (New Zealand) M Phillips	6	18
6	(Chinese Taipei) Chen H-l (Chinese Taipei) Lu C-b	21	21
(New Zealand) K Dennerly-Minturn (New Zealand) O Leydon-Davis	10	6
(New Zealand) R Batty (Fiji) B Molia	17	11
(Indonesia) A Adistia (Indonesia) M Gideon	21	21

Second Round
1	(Indonesia) A Pratama (Indonesia) R Saputro	21	21
(Japan) T Inoue (Japan) Y Kaneko	18	17
6	(Chinese Taipei) Chen H-l (Chinese Taipei) Lu C-b	21	14	21
(Indonesia) A Adistia (Indonesia) M Gideon	18	21	12

Quarterfinals
1	(Indonesia) A Pratama (Indonesia) R Saputro	21	21
6	(Chinese Taipei) Chen H-l (Chinese Taipei) Lu C-b	19	19

==== Section 2 ====
First Round
3	(Malaysia) Z Abdul Latif (Malaysia) F Tazari	21	21
(Chinese Taipei) Cheng P-w (Chinese Taipei) Lin Y-h	16	13
(Indonesia) B Septano (Indonesia) A Wirawan	21	21
(Thailand) W Ampunsuwan (Thailand) W Uttamang	14	7
8	(Malaysia) Chooi KM (Malaysia) Ow YH	21	21
(China) Li G (China) Liu C	15	18
Q2	(Japan) K Matsui (Japan) K Miura	21	21
PFQ	(New Zealand) S Ho (New Zealand) R Oud	15	10

Second Round
3	(Malaysia) Z Abdul Latif (Malaysia) F Tazari	22	15	17
(Indonesia) B Septano (Indonesia) A Wirawan	20	21	21
8	(Malaysia) Chooi KM (Malaysia) Ow YH	21	21
Q2	(Japan) K Matsui (Japan) K Miura	16	18

Quarterfinals
(Indonesia) B Septano (Indonesia) A Wirawan	21	21
8	(Malaysia) Chooi KM (Malaysia) Ow YH	17	15

=== Bottom half ===
==== Section 3 ====
First Round
(Australia) R Tam (Australia) G Warfe	22	19	11
(Chinese Taipei) Liang J-w (Chinese Taipei) Liao K-h	20	21	21
Q3	(Australia) M Chau (Australia) S Serasinghe	13	8
7	(South Korea) Kim D-e (South Korea) Shin B-c	21	21
PFQ	(Malaysia) Bong GY (Malaysia) Chong KH	13	19
(Chinese Taipei) Hsu J-h (Chinese Taipei) Wan C-h	21	21
(Indonesia) B Angriawan (Indonesia) Y Sugiarto	21	21
4	(Malaysia) Gan TC (Malaysia) Ong SH	17	17

Second Round
(Chinese Taipei) Liang J-w (Chinese Taipei) Liao K-h	21	17	21
7	(South Korea) Kim D-e (South Korea) Shin B-c	19	21	16
(Chinese Taipei) Hsu J-h (Chinese Taipei) Wan C-h	10	14
(Indonesia) B Angriawan (Indonesia) Y Sugiarto	21	21

Quarterfinals
(Chinese Taipei) Liang J-w (Chinese Taipei) Liao K-h	21	15	16
(Indonesia) B Angriawan (Indonesia) Y Sugiarto	8	21	21

==== Section 4 ====
First Round
(Chinese Taipei) Chiu C-w (Chinese Taipei) Tien J-c	21	21
(New Zealand) B Matheson (New Zealand) A Richardson	4	5
(Norway) J Christensen (Norway) M Myhre	8	5
5	(Indonesia) R Suwardi (Indonesia) M Ulinnuha	21	21
(Chinese Taipei) Chen C-j (Chinese Taipei) Lin Y-l	14	16
PFQ	(China) Li JH (China) Liu YC	21	21
(Chinese Taipei) Lin Y-j (Chinese Taipei) Wang C-h	15	13
2	(Malaysia) Goh VS (Malaysia) Lim KW	21	21

Second Round
(Chinese Taipei) Chiu C-w (Chinese Taipei) Tien J-c	20	21	21
5	(Indonesia) R Suwardi (Indonesia) M Ulinnuha	22	15	12
PFQ	(China) Li JH (China) Liu YC	21	17	21
2	(Malaysia) Goh VS (Malaysia) Lim KW	16	21	16

Quarterfinals
(Chinese Taipei) Chiu C-w (Chinese Taipei) Tien J-c	10	11
PFQ	(China) Li JH (China) Liu YC	21	21

== Women's doubles ==
=== Seeds ===
1. (Malaysia) Vivian Hoo Kah Mun / Woon Khe Wei (final)
2. (Indonesia) Komala Dewi / Jenna Gozali (quarter-final)
3. (Malaysia) Chow Mei Kuan / Lee Meng Yean (first round)
4. (Japan) Koharu Yonemoto / Yuriko Miki (second round)

=== Finals ===
Semifinals
1	(Malaysia) Vivian Hoo Kah Mun (Malaysia) Woon Khe Wei	21	15	21
(Indonesia) Vita Marissa (Indonesia) Variella Aprilsasi	19	21	17
(China) Ou Dongni (China) Tang Yuanting	21	21
(China) Xiao Ting (China) Xiong Rui	4	4

Final
1	(Malaysia) Vivian Hoo Kah Mun (Malaysia) Woon Khe Wei	15	21	19
(China) Ou Dongni (China) Tang Yuanting	21	11	21

=== Top half ===
==== Section 1 ====
First Round
1	(Malaysia) V Hoo (Malaysia) Woon KW
BYE
(New Zealand) K McLeod (New Zealand) R Phillips	4	5
(Japan) R Kakiiwa (Japan) Y Fukushima	21	21
(Thailand) P Chochuwong (Thailand) C Teachavorasinskun	21	21
(New Zealand) S Leydon-Davis (New Zealand) E Rodgers	10	8
(Australia) J Guan (Australia) G Somerville	21	21
(New Zealand) M Ho (New Zealand) J Ng	4	5

Second Round
1	(Malaysia) V Hoo (Malaysia) Woon KW	15	21	21
(Japan) R Kakiiwa (Japan) Y Fukushima	21	17	18
(Thailand) P Chochuwong (Thailand) C Teachavorasinskun	16	19
(Australia) J Guan (Australia) G Somerville	21	21

Quarterfinals
1	(Malaysia) V Hoo (Malaysia) Woon KW	21	21
(Australia) J Guan (Australia) G Somerville	14	10

==== Section 2 ====
First Round
4	(Japan) K Yonemoto (Japan) Y Miki	21	21
(New Caledonia) M Bravo (New Zealand) K Stern	8	9
(Indonesia) V Marissa (Indonesia) V Aprilsasi	15	21	21
(South Korea) Jang Y-n (South Korea) Kim S-y	21	19	19
(New Zealand) A Derby (New Zealand) R Goddard	7	7
(Indonesia) A Awanda (Indonesia) G Polii	21	21
(China) Chen QC (China) Huang DP	21	21
(Thailand) R Chuthabunditkul (Thailand) C Julrattanamanee	12	11

Second Round
4	(Japan) K Yonemoto (Japan) Y Miki	19	9
(Indonesia) V Marissa (Indonesia) V Aprilsasi	21	21
(Indonesia) A Awanda (Indonesia) G Polii	14	21	21
(China) Chen QC (China) Huang DP	21	15	17

Quarterfinals
(Indonesia) V Marissa (Indonesia) V Aprilsasi	21	15	21
(Indonesia) A Awanda (Indonesia) G Polii	11	21	11

=== Bottom half ===
==== Section 3 ====
First Round
(Australia) V Mak (Australia) N Sharp	6	7
(Chinese Taipei) Cheng C-y (Chinese Taipei) Wu T-j	21	21
(Thailand) P Arkornsakul (Thailand) J Kittiharakul	14	18
(Japan) N Fukuman (Japan) K Yonao	21	21
(Macau) Wang R (Macau) Zhang ZB	21	21
(Australia) J Lai (Australia) G Ngiam	8	11
(China) Ou DN (China) Tang YT	21	21
3	(Malaysia) Chow MK (Malaysia) Lee MY	9	13

Second Round
(Chinese Taipei) Cheng C-y (Chinese Taipei) Wu T-j	19	19
(Japan) N Fukuman (Japan) K Yonao	21	21
(Macau) Wang R (Macau) Zhang ZB	10	20
(China) Ou DN (China) Tang YT	21	22

Quarterfinals
(Japan) N Fukuman (Japan) K Yonao	14	18
(China) Ou DN (China) Tang YT	21	21

==== Section 4 ====
First Round
(China) Xiao T (China) Xiong R	21	21
(New Zealand) A Brown (New Zealand) K Gregory	11	9
(Australia) Chong VV (Australia) R Veeran	14	11
(South Korea) Ko A-r (South Korea) Yoo H-w	21	21
(New Zealand) A Pak (New Zealand) A Pak	15	8
(Australia) V Kessler (Australia) T Pilven	21	21
(New Zealand) A Rankin (New Zealand) M Stapleton	12	9
2	(Indonesia) K Dewi (Indonesia) J Gozali	21	21

Second Round
(China) Xiao T (China) Xiong R	10	24	21
(South Korea) Ko A-r (South Korea) Yoo H-w	21	22	19
(Australia) V Kessler (Australia) T Pilven	10	12
2	(Indonesia) K Dewi (Indonesia) J Gozali	21	21

Quarterfinals
(China) Xiao T (China) Xiong R	21	21
2	(Indonesia) K Dewi (Indonesia) J Gozali	17	18

== Mixed doubles ==
=== Seeds ===
1. (Indonesia) Riky Widianto / Richi Puspita Dili (final)
2. (Indonesia) Irfan Fadhilah / Weni Anggraini (quarter-final)
3. (Malaysia) Tan Aik Quan / Lai Pei Jing (quarter-final)
4. (South Korea) Shin Baek-cheol / Jang Ye-na (quarter-final)
5. (Indonesia) Praveen Jordan / Vita Marissa (champion)
6. (South Korea) Kim Dae-eun / Kim So-young (semi-final)
7. (Chinese Taipei) Chen Hung-ling / Wu Ti-jung (semi-final)
8. (Chinese Taipei) Lin Yen-jui / Pai Hsiao-ma (first round)

=== Finals ===
Semifinals
1	(Indonesia) Riky Widianto (Indonesia) Richi Puspita Dili	21	11	21
6	(South Korea) Kim Dae-eun (South Korea) Kim So-young	17	21	16
5	(Indonesia) Praveen Jordan (Indonesia) Vita Marissa	21	21
7	(Chinese Taipei) Chen Hung-ling (Chinese Taipei) Wu Ti-jung	12	16

Final
1	(Indonesia) Riky Widianto (Indonesia) Richi Puspita Dili	18	8
5	(Indonesia) Praveen Jordan (Indonesia) Vita Marissa	21	21

=== Top half ===
==== Section 1 ====
First Round
1	(Indonesia) R Widianto (Indonesia) R Dili	21	16	21
Q2	(China) Li JH (China) Ou DN	17	21	12
(China) Liu YC (China) Huang DP	21	21
(Malaysia) Chan KB (Indonesia) M Wiranto	8	11
8	(Chinese Taipei) Lin Y-j (Chinese Taipei) Pai H-m	21	14	15
(Australia) R Smith (Australia) R Veeran	17	21	21
(New Zealand) K Dennerly-Minturn (New Zealand) K Gregory	9	12
(Thailand) W Uttamang (Thailand) C Julrattanamanee	21	21

Second Round
1	(Indonesia) R Widianto (Indonesia) R Dili	19	21	21
(China) Liu YC (China) Huang DP	21	8	17
(Australia) R Smith (Australia) R Veeran	21	21
(Thailand) W Uttamang (Thailand) C Julrattanamanee	16	9

Quarterfinals
1	(Indonesia) R Widianto (Indonesia) R Dili	21	21
(Australia) R Smith (Australia) R Veeran	13	18

==== Section 2 ====
First Round
3	(Malaysia) Tan AQ (Malaysia) Lai PJ	18	21	25
(Chinese Taipei) Lu C-b (Chinese Taipei) Cheng C-y	21	11	23
Q1	(New Zealand) L Charlesworth (New Zealand) V Copeland	21	21
(New Zealand) M Fowke (New Zealand) E Rodgers	18	17
6	(South Korea) Kim D-e (South Korea) Kim S-y	21	21
(New Zealand) M Phillips (New Zealand) A Pak	11	7
Q4	(New Zealand) A Richardson (New Zealand) F Leydon-Davis	7	9
(Indonesia) M Gideon (Indonesia) V Aprilsasi	21	21

Second Round
3	(Malaysia) Tan AQ (Malaysia) Lai PJ	21	21
Q1	(New Zealand) L Charlesworth (New Zealand) V Copeland	8	8
6	(South Korea) Kim D-e (South Korea) Kim S-y	21	18	21
(Indonesia) M Gideon (Indonesia) V Aprilsasi	19	21	14

Quarterfinals
3	(Malaysia) Tan AQ (Malaysia) Lai PJ	15	22	6
6	(South Korea) Kim D-e (South Korea) Kim S-y	21	20	21

=== Bottom half ===
==== Section 3 ====
First Round
PFQ	(China) Huang KX (China) Chen QC	22	21
(Thailand) W Ampunsuwan (Thailand) R Chuthabunditkul	20	15
(New Zealand) B Matheson (New Zealand) M Ho	9	10
5	(Indonesia) P Jordan (Indonesia) V Marissa	21	21
(New Zealand) D Hillier (New Zealand) K McLeod	10	8
(Australia) R Tam (Australia) G Somerville	21	21
(England) T Armstrong (England) T Hallam	13	12
4	(South Korea) Shin B-c (South Korea) Jang Y-n	21	21

Second Round
PFQ	(China) Huang KX (China) Chen QC	23	15	14
5	(Indonesia) P Jordan (Indonesia) V Marissa	21	21	21
(Australia) R Tam (Australia) G Somerville	7	12
4	(South Korea) Shin B-c (South Korea) Jang Y-n	21	21

Quarterfinals
5	(Indonesia) P Jordan (Indonesia) V Marissa	20	21	21
4	(South Korea) Shin B-c (South Korea) Jang Y-n	22	19	16

==== Section 4 ====
First Round
(Malaysia) Chooi KM (Malaysia) Chow MK	21	21
(New Zealand) K Lee (Australia) N Sharp	11	10
(New Zealand) O Leydon-Davis (New Zealand) S Leydon-Davis	13	12
7	(Chinese Taipei) Chen H-l (Chinese Taipei) Wu T-j	21	21
(New Zealand) J Eunson (New Zealand) M Stapleton	19	28	11
Q3	(Australia) M Chau (Australia) J Guan	21	26	21
(Malaysia) V Mawan (Malaysia) S Saniru	11	14
2	(Indonesia) I Fadhilah (Indonesia) W Anggraini	21	21

Second Round
(Malaysia) Chooi KM (Malaysia) Chow MK	14	11
7	(Chinese Taipei) Chen H-l (Chinese Taipei) Wu T-j	21	21
Q3	(Australia) M Chau (Australia) J Guan	13	9
2	(Indonesia) I Fadhilah (Indonesia) W Anggraini	21	21

Quarterfinals
7	(Chinese Taipei) Chen H-l (Chinese Taipei) Wu T-j	21	21
2	(Indonesia) I Fadhilah (Indonesia) W Anggraini	19	14

Preceded by 2013 Australia Open Grand Prix Gold	BWF Grand Prix Gold and Grand Prix; 2013 season	Succeeded by 2013 Malaysia Grand Prix Gold
