= 2017 New Zealand Open Grand Prix Gold =

Tournament details
- Dates: 1–6 August
- Level: Grand Prix Gold
- Total prize money: US$120,000
- Venue: North Shore Events Centre
- Location: Auckland, New Zealand

Champions
- Men's singles: (Hong Kong) Lee Cheuk Yiu
- Women's singles: (Thailand) Ratchanok Intanon
- Men's doubles: (Chinese Taipei) Chen Hung-ling (Chinese Taipei) Wang Chi-lin
- Women's doubles: (Malaysia) Vivian Hoo Kah Mun (Malaysia) Woon Khe Wei
- Mixed doubles: (Indonesia) Ronald Alexander (Indonesia) Annisa Saufika

The 2017 New Zealand Open Grand Prix Gold was the twelfth Grand Prix's badminton tournament of the 2017 BWF Grand Prix Gold and Grand Prix. The tournament was held at the North Shore Events Centre in Auckland, New Zealand on 1–6 August 2017 and had a total purse of $120,000. Economic Development Minister Steven Joyce announced that the government is investing $185,000 for the 2016 and 2017 season. It is originally scheduled for March this year but delayed due to the Adele live concerts coming to Auckland at that time.

== Men's singles ==
=== Seeds ===
1. (Chinese Taipei) Wang Tzu-Wei (final)
2. (India) Ajay Jayaram (first round)
3. (Indonesia) Jonatan Christie (second round)
4. (India) H. S. Prannoy (quarterfinals)
5. (Indonesia) Anthony Sinisuka Ginting (withdrew)
6. (Chinese Taipei) Hsu Jen-Hao (semifinals)
7. (India) Sourabh Verma (quarterfinals)
8. (Spain) Pablo Abian (withdrew)
9. (Malaysia) Chong Wei Feng (third round)
10. (Hong Kong) Wei Nan (third round)
11. (Chinese Taipei) Lin Yu-hsien (semifinals)
12. (Indonesia) Ihsan Maulana Mustofa (withdrew)
13. (Israel) Misha Zilberman (third round)
14. (Malaysia) Liew Daren (second round)
15. (India) Kashyap Parupalli (third round)
16. (India) Siril Verma (third round)

=== Finals ===
Quarterfinals
1	(Chinese Taipei) Wang Tzu-wei	21	21
(Australia) Anthony Joe	7	7
4	(India) H. S. Prannoy	10	22	21
11	(Chinese Taipei) Lin Yu-hsien	21	20	23
7	(India) Sourabh Verma	19	16
(Hong Kong) Lee Cheuk Yiu	21	21
6	(Chinese Taipei) Hsu Jen-hao	22	23
(Chinese Taipei) Lu Chia-hung	20	21

Semifinals
1	(Chinese Taipei) Wang Tzu-wei	21	21
11	(Chinese Taipei) Lin Yu-hsien	11	12
(Hong Kong) Lee Cheuk Yiu	21	21
6	(Chinese Taipei) Hsu Jen-hao	12	19

Final
1	(Chinese Taipei) Wang Tzu-wei	21	15	20
(Hong Kong) Lee Cheuk Yiu	11	21	22

=== Top half ===
==== Section 1 ====
First round
1	(Chinese Taipei) Wang T-w	21	21
Q4	(New Zealand) M Peires	5	12
(India) P Joshi	21	21
(New Zealand) D Vong	10	13
9	(Malaysia) Chong W F	21	21
(China) Bai YP	11	10
(Australia) J Schueler	21	21
Q3	(New Zealand) C F Lim	5	6

Second round
1	(Chinese Taipei) Wang T-w	21	24
(India) P Joshi	13	22
9	(Malaysia) Chong W F	21	21
(Australia) J Schueler	14	15

Third round
1	(Chinese Taipei) Wang T-w	21	21
9	(Malaysia) Chong W F	15	10

==== Section 2 ====
First round
PFQ	(Indonesia) R Kurniawan	21	10	20
(New Zealand) D Vong	9	21	22
Q1	(New Zealand) A Manota	23	17	22
(Malaysia) Soh W Y	21	21	24
PFQ	(New Zealand) A Rouse	15	18
(Australia) A Joe	21	21
(Indonesia) A Yunanto	8	9
(India) N Vashist	21	21

Second round
(New Zealand) D Vong	15	13
(Malaysia) Soh W Y	21	21
(Australia) A Joe	21	21
(India) N Vashist	16	13

Third round
(Malaysia) Soh W Y	17	21	14
(Australia) A Joe	21	18	21

==== Section 3 ====
First round
4	(India) H. S. Prannoy	21	21
(Indonesia) S H Rhistavito	14	16
Q2	(New Zealand) C Steeghs	9	12
(Indonesia) F A Kholik	21	21
10	(Hong Kong) Wei N	19	21	21
(Chinese Taipei) Chen C-w	21	14	16
(India) S Rawat	12	8
(Malaysia) Goh G C	21	21

Second round
4	(India) H. S. Prannoy	23	21
(Indonesia) F A Kholik	21	18
10	(Hong Kong) Wei N	20	21	21
(Malaysia) Goh G C	22	8	15

Third round
4	(India) H. S. Prannoy	21	21
10	(Hong Kong) Wei N	18	19

==== Section 4 ====
First round
PFQ	(Australia) R Sing	11	5
(Netherlands) E Meijs	21	21
(Australia) P S Low	15	13
(Malaysia) Tan J W	21	21
11	(Chinese Taipei) Lin Y-h	21	21
(China) Lu GZ	16	14
(India) S Sipani	21	21
Q8	(New Zealand) J Feng	10	10

Second round
(Netherlands) E Meijs	21	21
(Malaysia) Tan J W	18	15
11	(Chinese Taipei) Lin Y-h	21	21
(India) S Sipani	9	8

Third round
(Netherlands) E Meijs	16	12
11	(Chinese Taipei) Lin Y-h	21	21

=== Bottom half ===
==== Section 5 ====
First round
(New Zealand) O Guo	21	21
(Australia) A Gobinathan	7	11
(Indonesia) D H Rumbaka	5	10
15	(India) K Parupalli	21	21
(Australia) P Yan	10	14
(Indonesia) K H Wibowo	21	21
(Australia) N Tang	17	15
7	(India) S Verma	21	21

Second round
(New Zealand) O Guo	9	8
15	(India) K Parupalli	21	21
(Indonesia) K H Wibowo	16	16
7	(India) S Verma	21	21

Third round
15	(India) K Parupalli	18	21	16
7	(India) S Verma	21	13	21

==== Section 6 ====
First round
(England) Y Wang	21	21
(New Zealand) E Lau	12	16
Q7	(New Zealand) Chan Y L	10	10
13	(Israel) M Zilberman	21	21
(Hong Kong) Lee C Y	23	21
(India) S Thakur	21	14
Q5	(New Zealand) V Harris	7	6
3	(Indonesia) J Christie	21	21

Second round
(England) Y Wang	14	13
13	(Israel) M Zilberman	21	21
(Hong Kong) Lee C Y	21	21
3	(Indonesia) J Christie	17	13

Third round
13	(Israel) M Zilberman	10	12
(Hong Kong) Lee C Y	21	21

==== Section 7 ====
First round
(China) Zhou ZQ	21	21
(Germany) A Roovers	15	16
(New Zealand) D Soedjasa	16	18
14	(Malaysia) Liew D	21	21
(Australia) C Chen	7	7
(Malaysia) Lee Z J	21	21
(Indonesia) N E Sulistyo	8	9
6	(Chinese Taipei) Hsu J-h	21	21

Second round
(China) Zhou ZQ	21	16
14	(Malaysia) Liew D	19	10^{r}
(Malaysia) Lee Z J	18	21	16
6	(Chinese Taipei) Hsu J-h	21	19	21

Third round
(China) Zhou ZQ	13	7
6	(Chinese Taipei) Hsu J-h	21	21

==== Section 8 ====
First round
(India) A K A Kumar	16	12
(Indonesia) V A Saputra	21	21
(Indonesia) R Subagja	13	12
16	(India) S Verma	21	21
(Indonesia) K M Sugiarto	21	12	18
Q6	(New Zealand) T Fang	17	21	21
(Chinese Taipei) Lu C-h	21	21
2	(India) A Jayaram	19	13

Second round
(Indonesia) V A Saputra	14	16
16	(India) S Verma	21	21
Q6	(New Zealand) T Fang	9	6
(Chinese Taipei) Lu C-h	21	21

Third round
16	(India) S Verma	13	14
(Chinese Taipei) Lu C-h	21	21

== Women's singles ==
=== Seeds ===
1. (Thailand) Ratchanok Intanon (champion)
2. (Indonesia) Fitriani (semifinals)
3. (Malaysia) Goh Jin Wei (withdrew)
4. (Indonesia) Hanna Ramadini (semifinals)
5. (Japan) Saena Kawakami (final)
6. (Indonesia) Dinar Dyah Ayustine (quarterfinals)
7. (Malaysia) Lee Ying Ying (first round)
8. (Indonesia) Yulia Yosephine Susanto (second round)

=== Finals ===
Semifinals
1	(Thailand) Ratchanok Intanon	21	21
4	(Indonesia) Hanna Ramadini	13	17
5	(Japan) Saena Kawakami	21	17	21
2	(Indonesia) Fitriani	12	21	17

Final
1	(Thailand) Ratchanok Intanon	21	16	21
5	(Japan) Saena Kawakami	14	21	15

=== Top half ===
==== Section 1 ====
First round
1	(Thailand) R Intanon	21	21
(Indonesia) J Muljati	17	13
Q4	(Australia) J Yingzi	21	21	21
(Australia) J Tam	14	23	15
6	(Indonesia) D D Ayustine	21	21
(Australia) Chen H-y	10	14
Q1	(New Zealand) C Zhang	21	21
(New Zealand) K Stern	13	11

Second round
1	(Thailand) R Intanon	21	21
Q4	(Australia) J Yingzi	2	8
6	(Indonesia) D D Ayustine	21	21
Q1	(New Zealand) C Zhang	14	7

Quarterfinals
1	(Thailand) R Intanon	19	21	21
6	(Indonesia) D D Ayustine	21	10	11

==== Section 2 ====
First round
4	(Indonesia) H Ramadini	21	21
Q2	(England) E Beach	4	4
(China) Wang ZY	21	21
(Australia) R Serasinghe	9	8
7	(Malaysia) Lee Y Y	21	13	20
(Chinese Taipei) Pai Y-p	17	21	22
(Japan) R Nagata	21	21
(China) Cai YY	17	18

Second round
4	(Indonesia) H Ramadini	21	21
(China) Wang ZY	18	10
(Chinese Taipei) Pai Y-p	21	21
(Japan) R Nagata	11	12

Quarterfinals
4	(Indonesia) H Ramadini	21	21
(Chinese Taipei) Pai Y-p	12	19

=== Bottom half ===
==== Section 3 ====
First round
(Chinese Taipei) Chen H-h	22	16
(China) Han Y	24	21
Q3	(New Zealand) Y Xie	12	3
5	(Japan) S Kawakami	21	21
(China) Wei YX	21	21
PFQ	(Indonesia) M Mawarti	12	13
PFQ	(Indonesia) P Sekartaji	21	21
PFQ	(New Zealand) G Galvez	18	14

Second round
(China) Han Y	14	11
5	(Japan) S Kawakami	21	21
(China) Wei YX	21	15
PFQ	(Indonesia) P Sekartaji	8	7^{r}

Quarterfinals
5	(Japan) S Kawakami	22	21
(China) Wei YX	20	15

==== Section 4 ====
First round
(China) Li WM	18	14
(Malaysia) Ho Y M	21	21
(Australia) L Lim	11	6
8	(Indonesia) Y Y Susanto	21	21
(Canada) B Tam	21	21
(New Zealand) S Fu	13	4
(Australia) T Ho	14	4
2	(Indonesia) Fitriani	21	21

Second round
(Malaysia) Ho Y M	21	21
8	(Indonesia) Y Y Susanto	13	16
(Canada) B Tam	7	15
2	(Indonesia) Fitriani	21	21

Quarterfinals
(Malaysia) Ho Y M	21	10	13
2	(Indonesia) Fitriani	9	21	21

== Men's doubles ==
=== Seeds ===
1. (Chinese Taipei) Chen Hung-ling / Wang Chi-lin (champion)
2. (Malaysia) Ong Yew Sin / Teo Ee Yi (final)
3. (India) Manu Attri / B. Sumeeth Reddy (withdrew)
4. (India) Satwiksairaj Rankireddy / Chirag Shetty (withdrew)
5. (Australia) Matthew Chau / Sawan Serasinghe (second round)
6. (Malaysia) Goh Sze Fei / Nur Izzuddin (first round)
7. (Chinese Taipei) Liao Min-chun / Su Cheng-heng (quarterfinals)
8. (India) Arjun M.R. / Ramchandran Shlok (withdrew)

=== Finals ===
Semifinals
1	(Chinese Taipei) Chen Hung-ling (Chinese Taipei) Wang Chi-lin	21	21
(Indonesia) Kenas Adi Haryanto (Indonesia) Moh Reza Pahlevi Isfahani	13	15
(China) He Jiting (China) Tan Qiang	19	11
2	(Malaysia) Ong Yew Sin (Malaysia) Teo Ee Yi	21	21

Final
1	(Chinese Taipei) Chen Hung-ling (Chinese Taipei) Wang Chi-lin	21	21
2	(Malaysia) Ong Yew Sin (Malaysia) Teo Ee Yi	16	18

=== Top half ===
==== Section 1 ====
First round
1	(Chinese Taipei) Chen H-l (Chinese Taipei) Wang C-l	21	21
Q4	(New Zealand) A Manota (New Zealand) D Soedjasa	9	13
(New Zealand) Chan Y L (New Zealand) C Cheng	9	18
(China) Han CK (China) Zhou HD	21	21
6	(Malaysia) Goh S F (Malaysia) N Izzuddin	14	19
(China) Chen SH (China) Fan QY	21	21
(Malaysia) Chong W F (Malaysia) Lim K W	21	15	11
(Philippines) C A Cayanan (Philippines) P J Escutea	18	21	21

Second round
1	(Chinese Taipei) Chen H-l (Chinese Taipei) Wang C-l	21	21
(China) Han CK (China) Zhou HD	10	14
(China) Chen SH (China) Fan QY	21	21
(Philippines) C A Cayanan (Philippines) P J Escutea	14	15

Quarterfinals
1	(Chinese Taipei) Chen H-l (Chinese Taipei) Wang C-l	21	21
(China) Chen SH (China) Fan QY	10	12

==== Section 2 ====
First round
PFQ	(Netherlands) E Meijs (Germany) A Roovers	21	21
Q1	(New Zealand) M Phillips (New Zealand) C Steeghs	12	12
(Chinese Taipei) Liu W-c (Chinese Taipei) Tseng M-h	15	19
(Indonesia) K A Haryanto (Indonesia) M R P Isfahani	21	21
5	(Australia) M Chau (Australia) S Serasinghe	21	21
(New Zealand) J Curtin (New Zealand) D Oud	16	10
(Australia) Leung W H (Australia) M Wheller	10	14
(Chinese Taipei) Hsu J-h (Chinese Taipei) Lu C-p	21	21

Second round
PFQ	(Netherlands) E Meijs (Germany) A Roovers
(Indonesia) K A Haryanto (Indonesia) M R P Isfahani	w	/	o
5	(Australia) M Chau (Australia) S Serasinghe	21	13	12
(Chinese Taipei) Hsu J-h (Chinese Taipei) Lu C-p	16	21	21

Quarterfinals
(Indonesia) K A Haryanto (Indonesia) M R P Isfahani	20	21	21
(Chinese Taipei) Hsu J-h (Chinese Taipei) Lu C-p	22	12	18

=== Bottom half ===
==== Section 3 ====
First round
(Indonesia) W Nayaka (Indonesia) A Yusuf	22	21
(Malaysia) Chua C W (Indonesia) A P R Putra	20	18
Q3	(Indonesia) R Kurniawan (Indonesia) K M Sugiarto	21	9	15^{r}
PFQ	(New Zealand) O Guo (New Zealand) D Vong	12	21	19
(Malaysia) N M Azryin Ayub (Malaysia) Ooi Z H	21	21
(India) S Sipani (India) J Yadav	12	16
(China) He JT (China) Tan Q	21	21
PFQ	(Australia) J Schueler (Australia) N Tang	5	4

Second round
(Indonesia) W Nayaka (Indonesia) A Yusuf	21	21
PFQ	(New Zealand) O Guo (New Zealand) D Vong	12	11
(Malaysia) N M Azryin Ayub (Malaysia) Ooi Z H	16	11^{r}
(China) He JT (China) Tan Q	21	21

Quarterfinals
(Indonesia) W Nayaka (Indonesia) A Yusuf	19	13
(China) He JT (China) Tan Q	21	21

==== Section 4 ====
First round
(Australia) C Chen (Australia) T Wong	16	17
PFQ	(Malaysia) Ian Wong J S (Indonesia) R Widianto	21	21
(Malaysia) Chen T J (Malaysia) Soh W Y	18	17
7	(Chinese Taipei) Liao M-c (Chinese Taipei) Su C-h	21	21
Q2	(New Zealand) R Cheng (New Zealand) E Wong	12	15
(New Zealand) K Dennerly-Minturn (New Zealand) S Ho	21	21
(Philippines) P G Magnaye (Philippines) A Morada	12	21	16
2	(Malaysia) Ong Y S (Malaysia) Teo E Y	21	19	21

Second round
PFQ	(Malaysia) Ian Wong J S (Indonesia) R Widianto	11	13
7	(Chinese Taipei) Liao M-c (Chinese Taipei) Su C-h	21	21
(New Zealand) K Dennerly-Minturn (New Zealand) S Ho	13	6
2	(Malaysia) Ong Y S (Malaysia) Teo E Y	21	21

Quarterfinals
7	(Chinese Taipei) Liao M-c (Chinese Taipei) Su C-h	21	14	16
2	(Malaysia) Ong Y S (Malaysia) Teo E Y	19	21	21

== Women's doubles ==
=== Seeds ===
1. (Malaysia) Vivian Hoo Kah Mun / Woon Khe Wei (champion)
2. (Australia) Setyana Mapasa / Gronya Somerville (withdrew)
3. (India) Ashwini Ponnappa / N. Sikki Reddy (withdrew)
4. (Japan) Ayako Sakuramoto / Yukiko Takahata (final)

=== Finals ===
Semifinals
1	(Malaysia) Vivian Hoo Kah Mun (Malaysia) Woon Khe Wei	21	13	21
(Indonesia) Greysia Polii (Indonesia) Apriyani Rahayu	18	21	13
4	(Japan) Ayako Sakuramoto (Japan) Yukiko Takahata	23	21
(China) Liu Xuanxuan (China) Xia Yuting	21	13

Final
1	(Malaysia) Vivian Hoo Kah Mun (Malaysia) Woon Khe Wei	18	21	21
4	(Japan) Ayako Sakuramoto (Japan) Yukiko Takahata	21	16	19

=== Top half ===
==== Section 1 ====
First round
1	(Malaysia) Vivian Hoo K M (Malaysia) Woon K W
BYE
(New Zealand) D Tahuri (New Zealand) Y Xie	21	0
(Indonesia) M Mawarti (Indonesia) P Sekartaji	5	0^{r}
(Thailand) R Laisuan (Thailand) S Mingchua	22	21
(Australia) T Ho (Australia) J Tam	20	14
(New Zealand) C Alley (New Zealand) K Stern	14	15
(China) Qiao SJ (China) Zhang SX	21	21

Second round
1	(Malaysia) Vivian Hoo K M (Malaysia) Woon K W	21	21
(New Zealand) D Tahuri (New Zealand) Y Xie	12	10
(Thailand) R Laisuan (Thailand) S Mingchua	14	21	12
(China) Qiao SJ (China) Zhang SX	21	13	21

Quarterfinals
1	(Malaysia) Vivian Hoo K M (Malaysia) Woon K W	21	21
(China) Qiao SJ (China) Zhang SX	7	16

==== Section 2 ====
First round
3	(India) A Ponnappa (India) N. S Reddy
(Japan) N Matsuyama (Japan) C Shida	w	/	o
(China) Du Y (China) Xu Y	17	20
(Indonesia) G Polii (Indonesia) A Rahayu	21	22
(New Zealand) S L Lee (New Zealand) C Zhang	12	6
(Chinese Taipei) Cheng Y-c (Chinese Taipei) Hu L-f	21	21
(Japan) M Matsumoto (Japan) W Nagahara	19	21	21
(Indonesia) N K Mahadewi Istirani (Indonesia) R E Putri Sari	21	19	9

Second round
(Japan) N Matsuyama (Japan) C Shida	13	21	19
(Indonesia) G Polii (Indonesia) A Rahayu	21	16	21
(Chinese Taipei) Cheng Y-c (Chinese Taipei) Hu L-f	22	21
(Japan) M Matsumoto (Japan) W Nagahara	20	14

Quarterfinals
(Indonesia) G Polii (Indonesia) A Rahayu	21	21
(Chinese Taipei) Cheng Y-c (Chinese Taipei) Hu L-f	11	10

=== Bottom half ===
==== Section 3 ====
First round
(Philippines) S J Barredo (Philippines) A Y Leonardo
(New Zealand) A Tagle (New Zealand) J Yu	w	/	o
(Indonesia) J Muljati (Indonesia) Y Y Susanto	12	10
(Malaysia) J Choong (Malaysia) Goh Y C	21	21
(New Zealand) E Calder-Hawkins (New Zealand) J Ng	16	21	16
(Indonesia) K N Hanadia (Indonesia) D T Permatasari	21	13	21
(India) S Ghorpade (India) P Sawant	15	18
4	(Japan) A Sakuramoto (Japan) Y Takahata	21	21

Second round
(New Zealand) A Tagle (New Zealand) J Yu	4	5
(Malaysia) J Choong (Malaysia) Goh Y C	21	21
(Indonesia) K N Hanadia (Indonesia) D T Permatasari	9	14
4	(Japan) A Sakuramoto (Japan) Y Takahata	21	21

Quarterfinals
(Malaysia) J Choong (Malaysia) Goh Y C	30	11	20
4	(Japan) A Sakuramoto (Japan) Y Takahata	28	21	22

==== Section 4 ====
First round
(New Zealand) A Pak (Indonesia) F A Rahardja	12	13
(China) Liu XX (China) Xia YT	21	21
(New Zealand) S Fu (New Zealand) T Otene	5	9
(Japan) Y Murayama (Japan) N Uratani	21	21
(New Zealand) J Liang (New Zealand) R Li	11	6
(Indonesia) Y Barkah (Indonesia) M C Sahputri	21	21
(New Zealand) E Smith (New Zealand) J Wheki	w	/	o
2	(Australia) S Mapasa (Australia) G Somerville

Second round
(China) Liu XX (China) Xia YT	21	21
(Japan) Y Murayama (Japan) N Uratani	17	15
(Indonesia) Y Barkah (Indonesia) M C Sahputri	21	21
(New Zealand) E Smith (New Zealand) J Wheki	9	10

Quarterfinals
(China) Liu XX (China) Xia YT	21	14	21
(Indonesia) Y Barkah (Indonesia) M C Sahputri	16	21	14

== Mixed doubles ==
=== Seeds ===
1. (India) Pranaav Jerry Chopra / N. Sikki Reddy (withdrew)
2. (Indonesia) Hafiz Faisal / Shella Devi Aulia (first round)
3. (Chinese Taipei) Tseng Min-hao / Hu Ling-fang (second round)
4. (Malaysia) Yogendran Khrishnan / (India) Prajakta Sawant (first round)
5. (Chinese Taipei) Liao Min-chun / Chen Hsiao-huan (second round)
6. (Indonesia) Edi Subaktiar / Gloria Emanuelle Widjaja (quarterfinals)
7. (China) He Jiting / Du Yue (quarterfinals)
8. (Australia) Sawan Serasinghe / Setyana Mapasa (final)

=== Finals ===
Semifinals
PFQ	(Indonesia) Ronald Alexander (Indonesia) Annisa Saufika	21	19	21
(Chinese Taipei) Wang Chi-lin (Australia) Wendy Chen Hsuan-yu	9	21	6
8	(Australia) Sawan Serasinghe (Australia) Setyana Mapasa	25	21
(China) Zhou Haodong (China) Xu Ya	23	18

Final
PFQ	(Indonesia) Ronald Alexander (Indonesia) Annisa Saufika	21	21
8	(Australia) Sawan Serasinghe (Australia) Setyana Mapasa	19	14

=== Top half ===
==== Section 1 ====
First round
PFQ	(Indonesia) R Alexander (Indonesia) A Saufika	21	21
(Indonesia) Z Habibi (Indonesia) D T Permatasari	6	9
PFQ	(New Zealand) E Lau (New Zealand) A Tagle	18	14
(Australia) Simon Leung W H (Australia) T Ho	21	21
6	(Indonesia) E Subaktiar (Indonesia) G E Widjaja	21	21
(New Zealand) J Curtin (New Zealand) E Calder-Hawkins	5	9
(China) Chen SH (China) Xia YT	19	21	21
(Philippines) A Morada (Philippines) A Y Leonardo	21	13	19

Second round
PFQ	(Indonesia) R Alexander (Indonesia) A Saufika	21	21
(Australia) Simon Leung W H (Australia) T Ho	7	6
6	(Indonesia) E Subaktiar (Indonesia) G E Widjaja	21	21
(China) Chen SH (China) Xia YT	14	10

Quarterfinals
PFQ	(Indonesia) R Alexander (Indonesia) A Saufika	18	21	23
6	(Indonesia) E Subaktiar (Indonesia) G E Widjaja	21	17	21

==== Section 2 ====
First round
3	(Chinese Taipei) Tseng M-h (Chinese Taipei) Hu L-f	21	21
Q3	(Indonesia) K M Sugiarto (Indonesia) K Rosmini	10	10
Q1	(New Zealand) Chan Y L (New Zealand) S Lee	10	15
(Chinese Taipei) Wang C-l (Australia) Chen H-y	21	21
7	(China) He JT (China) Du Y	21	21
(Malaysia) Chen T J (Malaysia) Tew J J	9	6
(Indonesia) H Tandjaya (Indonesia) P Sekartaji	8	12
(Chinese Taipei) Lu C-h (Chinese Taipei) Cheng Y-c	21	21

Second round
3	(Chinese Taipei) Tseng M-h (Chinese Taipei) Hu L-f	19	17
(Chinese Taipei) Wang C-l (Australia) Chen H-y	21	21
7	(China) He JT (China) Du Y	21	21
(Chinese Taipei) Lu C-h (Chinese Taipei) Cheng Y-c	7	17

Quarterfinals
(Chinese Taipei) Wang C-l (Australia) Chen H-y	21	21
7	(China) He JT (China) Du Y	13	4

=== Bottom half ===
==== Section 3 ====
First round
(Indonesia) M Maftuki (Indonesia) K N Hanadia	21	21
(New Zealand) K Dennerly-Minturn (New Zealand) D Tahuri	15	13
(China) Han CK (China) Zhang SX	13	17
8	(Australia) S Serasinghe (Australia) S Mapasa	21	21
Q2	(New Zealand) M Phillips (New Zealand) A Pak	10	13
(China) Tan Q (China) Qiao SJ	21	21
(China) Fan QY (China) Liu XX	21	21
4	(Malaysia) K Yogendran (India) P Sawant	13	13

Second round
(Indonesia) M Maftuki (Indonesia) K N Hanadia	9	15
8	(Australia) S Serasinghe (Australia) S Mapasa	21	21
(China) Tan Q (China) Qiao SJ	12	28	21
(China) Fan QY (China) Liu XX	21	26	13

Quarterfinals
8	(Australia) S Serasinghe (Australia) S Mapasa	21	21
(China) Tan Q (China) Qiao SJ	15	16

==== Section 4 ====
First round
(New Zealand) D Soedjasa (New Zealand) S Leydon-Davis	9	12
(China) Zhou HD (China) Xu Y	21	21
(Indonesia) A Yunanto (Indonesia) M Mawarti
5	(Chinese Taipei) Liao M-c (Chinese Taipei) Chen H-h	w	/	o
PFQ	(New Zealand) D Oud (New Zealand) Ng C M	19	17
Q4	(Indonesia) R Widianto (Indonesia) R P Dili	21	21
(Malaysia) Chan P S (Malaysia) Cheah Y S	21	21
2	(Indonesia) H Faisal (Indonesia) S D Aulia	10	19

Second round
(China) Zhou HD (China) Xu Y	22	21	21
5	(Chinese Taipei) Liao M-c (Chinese Taipei) Chen H-h	24	18	18
Q4	(Indonesia) R Widianto (Indonesia) R P Dili	12	21	21
(Malaysia) Chan P S (Malaysia) Cheah Y S	21	15	19

Quarterfinals
(China) Zhou HD (China) Xu Y	21	9	22
Q4	(Indonesia) R Widianto (Indonesia) R P Dili	18	21	20

Preceded by 2017 U.S. Open Grand Prix Gold	BWF Grand Prix Gold and Grand Prix; 2017 BWF Season	Succeeded by 2017 Vietnam Open Grand Prix
