= Simon Leung =

Australian badminton player (born 1996)

Simon Leung 梁永亨
Personal information
- Born: Simon Wing Hang Leung; 24 November 1996 (age 29) Brisbane, Australia
- Height: 1.76 m (5 ft 9 in)

Sport
- Country: Australia
- Sport: Badminton
- Handedness: Right

Men's & mixed doubles
- Highest ranking: 62 (MD with Mitchell Wheller 14 January 2020); 51 (XD with Gronya Somerville 17 March 2020)
- BWF profile
Medal record
Men's badminton
Representing Australia
Oceania Championships
| Gold medal – first place | 2019 Melbourne | Mixed doubles |
| Gold medal – first place | 2020 Ballarat | Mixed doubles |
| Silver medal – second place | 2019 Melbourne | Men's doubles |
| Bronze medal – third place | 2016 Papeete | Men's doubles |
| Bronze medal – third place | 2016 Papeete | Mixed doubles |
| Bronze medal – third place | 2017 Nouméa | Men's doubles |
| Bronze medal – third place | 2018 Hamilton | Men's doubles |
Oceania Mixed Team Championships
| Gold medal – first place | 2019 Melbourne | Mixed team |
Oceania Men's Team Championships
| Gold medal – first place | 2020 Ballarat | Men's team |

Simon Wing Hang Leung (born 24 November 1996) is an Australian badminton player specializing in doubles. He won the mixed doubles Oceania Championships title in 2019 and 2020.

Leung represented Australia at the 2020 Summer Olympics. As a mixed doubles badminton team, he and his partner, Gronya Somerville, were placed in the group with the eventual Japanese bronze medalists, and were not able to pick up a win.

== Early years ==
Leung was only 6 years old when started playing badminton. His whole family played badminton and he started competing in his home city of Brisbane.

Leung began competing professionally in 2010. He competed at the under 15 nationals and was part of the National Junior team until 2014. He represented Australia at the 2013 Oceania Championships and at the 2017 World Championships in Glasgow.

== Achievements ==
=== Oceania Championships ===
Men's doubles
| Year | Venue | Partner | Opponent | Score | Result |
|---|---|---|---|---|---|
| 2016 | Punaauia University Hall; Papeete, Tahiti | (Australia) Daniel Fan | (Australia) Matthew Chau (Australia) Sawan Serasinghe | 12–21, 15–21 | Bronze |
| 2017 | Salle Anewy; Nouméa, New Caledonia | (Australia) Mitchell Wheller | (New Zealand) Kevin Dennerly-Minturn (New Zealand) Niccolo Tagle | 21–16, 15–21, 18–21 | Bronze |
| 2018 | Eastlink Badminton Stadium; Hamilton, New Zealand | (Australia) Mitchell Wheller | (Australia) Robin Middleton (Australia) Ross Smith | 22–20, 15–21, 18–21 | Bronze |
| 2019 | Melbourne Sports and Aquatic Centre; Melbourne, Australia | (Australia) Mitchell Wheller | (Australia) Sawan Serasinghe (Australia) Eric Vuong | 17–21, 10–21 | Silver |

Mixed doubles
| Year | Venue | Partner | Opponent | Score | Result |
|---|---|---|---|---|---|
| 2016 | Punaauia University Hall; Papeete, Tahiti | (Australia) Tiffany Ho | (Australia) Anthony Joe (Australia) Joy Lai | 11–21, 18–21 | Bronze |
| 2019 | Melbourne Sports and Aquatic Centre; Melbourne, Australia | (Australia) Gronya Somerville | (Australia) Sawan Serasinghe (Australia) Lee Ye Khoo | 21–18, 21–15 | Gold |
| 2020 | Ken Kay Badminton Stadium; Ballarat, Australia | (Australia) Gronya Somerville | (Australia) Tran Hoang Pham (Australia) Sylvina Kurniawan | 21–12, 21–8 | Gold |

=== BWF International Challenge/Series (2 runners-up) ===
Men's doubles
| Year | Tournament | Partner | Opponent | Score | Result |
|---|---|---|---|---|---|
| 2019 | North Harbour International | (Australia) Mitchell Wheller | (China) Xuheng Zhuan Yi (China) Zhang Bin Rong | 14–21, 16–21 | (silver) Runner-up |

Mixed doubles
| Year | Tournament | Partner | Opponent | Score | Result |
|---|---|---|---|---|---|
| 2019 | Waikato International | (Australia) Gronya Somerville | (Japan) Hiroki Midorikawa (Japan) Natsu Saito | 15–21, 13–21 | (silver) Runner-up |

BWF International Series tournament
