= Yu Xiaoyu (badminton) =

Chinese badminton player

Yu Xiaoyu 于小渝
Personal information
- Born: 1 August 1992 Beijing, China
- Died: 9 December 2023 (aged 31) Hainan, China

Sport
- Country: China
- Sport: Badminton

Men's & mixed doubles
- Highest ranking: 148 (MD) 8 December 2016; 164 (XD) 24 March 2016
- Current ranking: 152 (MD) (29 June 2017)
- BWF profile

Yu Xiaoyu (Chinese: 于小渝; 1 August 1992 – 9 December 2023) was a Chinese badminton player. He started playing badminton at aged 9, and in 2009, he was selected to join the national team after trained in Beijing badminton team. His sister Yu Xiaohan is also a badminton player. He was the mixed doubles runner-up at the 2015 New Zealand Open partnered with Xia Huan.

== Achievements ==
=== BWF Grand Prix ===
The BWF Grand Prix has two levels: Grand Prix and Grand Prix Gold. It is a series of badminton tournaments, sanctioned by Badminton World Federation (BWF) since 2007.

Mixed Doubles
Year	Tournament	Partner	Opponent	Score	Result
2015	New Zealand Open	(China) Xia Huan	(China) Zheng Siwei (China) Chen Qingchen	14–21, 8–21	(silver) Runner-up

BWF Grand Prix Gold tournament
BWF Grand Prix tournament
