= 2017 Oceania Badminton Championships =

Tournament details
- Dates: 13-15 February 2017
- Edition: XII
- Venue: Salle Anewy
- Location: Nouméa, New Caledonia

The XII 2017 Oceania Badminton Championships was the 12th tournament of the Oceania Badminton Championships. It was held in Nouméa, New Caledonia from 13 to 15 February 2017.

== Venue ==
Salle Anewy in Nouméa, New Caledonia.

== Medalists ==
=== Individual event ===
The table below gives an overview of the individual event medal winners at the 2017 Oceania Championships.

Event	Gold	Silver	Bronze
Men's singles	(Australia) Pit Seng Low	(New Zealand) Niccolo Tagle	(Australia) Daniel Fan
Men's singles	(Australia) Pit Seng Low	(New Zealand) Niccolo Tagle	(Australia) Jacob Schueler
Women's singles	(Australia) Wendy Chen Hsuan-yu	(Australia) Tiffany Ho	(Australia) Joy Lai
Women's singles	(Australia) Wendy Chen Hsuan-yu	(Australia) Tiffany Ho	(Australia) Jennifer Tam
Men's doubles	(Australia) Matthew Chau and Sawan Serasinghe	(New Zealand) Kevin Dennerly-Minturn and Niccolo Tagle	(New Zealand) Jonathan Curtin and Dhanny Oud
Men's doubles	(Australia) Matthew Chau and Sawan Serasinghe	(New Zealand) Kevin Dennerly-Minturn and Niccolo Tagle	(Australia) Simon Leung and Mitchell Wheller
Women's doubles	(Australia) Setyana Mapasa and Gronya Somerville	(Australia) Tiffany Ho and Joy Lai	(New Zealand) Vicki Copeland and Anona Pak
Women's doubles	(Australia) Setyana Mapasa and Gronya Somerville	(Australia) Tiffany Ho and Joy Lai	(New Zealand) Susannah Leydon-Davis and Danielle Tahuri
Mixed doubles	(Australia) Sawan Serasinghe and Setyana Mapasa	(Australia) Joel Findlay and Gronya Somerville	(Australia) Mitchell Wheller and Wendy Chen Hsuan-yu
Mixed doubles	(Australia) Sawan Serasinghe and Setyana Mapasa	(Australia) Joel Findlay and Gronya Somerville	(New Zealand) Kevin Dennerly-Minturn and Danielle Tahuri
