= Vicki Copeland =

New Zealand badminton player

Personal information
- Born: 24 November 1988 (age 37)

Sport
- Country: New Zealand
- Sport: Badminton

Women's
- Highest ranking: 257 (WS) 17 Mar 2016; 191 (WD) 22 May 2014; 319 (XD) 19 Jun 2014
- BWF profile
Medal record
Badminton
Representing New Zealand
Oceania Badminton Championships
| Silver medal – second place | 2016 Auckland | Women's team |
| Silver medal – second place | 2016 Auckland | Mixed team |
| Bronze medal – third place | 2017 Nouméa | Women's doubles |

Vicki Copeland (born 24 November 1988) is a New Zealand female badminton player. She was the women's doubles runner-up at the Waikato International tournament partnered with Anona Pak. In 2017, she and Pak won bronze at the Oceania Championships in the women's doubles event.

== Achievements ==
=== Oceania Badminton Championships ===
Women's Doubles
| Year | Venue | Partner | Opponent | Score | Result |
|---|---|---|---|---|---|
| 2017 | Salle Anewy; Nouméa, New Caledonia | (New Zealand) Anona Pak | (Australia) Tiffany Ho (Australia) Joy Lai | 21-19, 19–21, 17-21 | Bronze |

=== BWF International Challenge/Series ===
Women's Doubles
| Year | Tournament | Partner | Opponent | Score | Result |
|---|---|---|---|---|---|
| 2016 | Waikato International | (New Zealand) Anona Pak | (Australia) Tiffany Ho (Australia) Jennifer Tam | 19-21, 21–18, 12-21 | (silver) Runner-up |

BWF International Challenge tournament
BWF International Series tournament
BWF Future Series tournament

== See also ==
- Sport in New Zealand
