= Anona Pak =

New Zealand badminton player (born 1993)

Personal information
- Born: 29 November 1993 (age 32) Hong Kong

Sport
- Country: New Zealand
- Sport: Badminton

Women's & mixed doubles
- Highest ranking: 107 (WD with Vicki Copeland 16 March 2017); 48 (XD with Oliver Leydon-Davis 27 September 2022)
- BWF profile
Medal record
Women's badminton
Representing New Zealand
Oceania Championships
Silver medal – second place	2022 Melbourne	Mixed doubles
Bronze medal – third place	2017 Nouméa	Women's doubles
Bronze medal – third place	2018 Hamilton	Women's doubles
Bronze medal – third place	2019 Melbourne	Women's doubles
Bronze medal – third place	2024 Geelong	Women's doubles
Oceania Mixed Team Championships
Silver medal – second place	2019 Melbourne	Mixed team
Silver medal – second place	2023 Auckland	Mixed team
Oceania Women's Team Championships
Silver medal – second place	2016 Auckland	Women's team
Silver medal – second place	2018 Hamilton	Women's team
Silver medal – second place	2020 Ballarat	Women's team
Silver medal – second place	2024 Geelong	Women's team

Anona Pak (born 29 November 1993) is a New Zealand badminton player. She was the women's doubles runner-up at the Waikato International tournament partnered with Vicki Copeland. She also received 2016 Massey University Manawatu sportswoman of the year at the Massey Blues Sports Awards, because of her success won the national championships in woman's doubles and mixed doubles. She was three times women's doubles bronze medalists at the Oceania Championships.

== Achievements ==
=== Oceania Championships ===
Women's doubles
Year	Venue	Partner	Opponent	Score	Result
2017	Salle Anewy; Nouméa, New Caledonia	(New Zealand) Vicki Copeland	(Australia) Tiffany Ho (Australia) Joy Lai	21–19, 19–21, 17–21	Bronze
2018	Eastlink Badminton Stadium; Hamilton, New Zealand	(New Zealand) Danielle Tahuri	(Australia) Setyana Mapasa (Australia) Gronya Somerville	9–21, 21–18, 10–21	Bronze
2019	Melbourne Sports and Aquatic Centre; Melbourne, Australia	(New Zealand) Erena Calder-Hawkins	(Australia) Setyana Mapasa (Australia) Gronya Somerville	12–21, 14–21	Bronze
2024	Leisuretime Sports Precinct; Geelong, Australia	(New Zealand) Erena Calder-Hawkins	(Australia) Setyana Mapasa (Australia) Angela Yu	12–21, 14–21	Bronze

Mixed doubles
Year	Venue	Partner	Opponent	Score	Result
2022	Melbourne Sports and Aquatic Centre; Melbourne, Australia	(New Zealand) Oliver Leydon-Davis	(Australia) Kenneth Choo (Australia) Gronya Somerville	18–21, 21–19, 12–21	Silver

=== BWF International Challenge/Series ===
Women's doubles
Year	Tournament	Partner	Opponent	Score	Result
2016	Waikato International	(New Zealand) Vicki Copeland	(Australia) Tiffany Ho (Australia) Jennifer Tam	19–21, 21–18, 12–21	(silver) Runner-up

Mixed doubles
Year	Tournament	Partner	Opponent	Score	Result
2018	North Harbour International	(New Zealand) Maika Phillips	(Brazil) Fabricio Farias (Brazil) Jaqueline Lima	21–6, 27–25	(gold) Winner
2019	Sydney International	(New Zealand) Oliver Leydon-Davis	(Philippines) Peter Gabriel Magnaye (Philippines) Thea Pomar	9–21, 19–21	(silver) Runner-up

BWF International Challenge tournament
BWF International Series tournament
BWF Future Series tournament
