= Oliver Leydon-Davis =

New Zealand badminton player (born 1990)

Personal information
- Born: 10 May 1990 (age 36) Hamilton, New Zealand
- Height: 1.80 m (5 ft 11 in)
- Weight: 68 kg (150 lb)

Sport
- Country: New Zealand
- Sport: Badminton

Men's & mixed doubles
- Highest ranking: 37 (MD 28 June 2010); 43 (XD 27 February 2014)
- Current ranking: 50 (with Anona Pak 20 December 2022)
- BWF profile
Medal record
Men's badminton
Representing New Zealand
Oceania Championships
Gold medal – first place	2014 Ballarat	Mixed doubles
Gold medal – first place	2020 Ballarat	Men's doubles
Silver medal – second place	2010 Invercargill	Men's doubles
Silver medal – second place	2012 Ballarat	Men's doubles
Silver medal – second place	2015 North Harbour	Men's doubles
Silver medal – second place	2015 North Harbour	Mixed doubles
Silver medal – second place	2022 Melbourne	Mixed doubles
Bronze medal – third place	2014 Ballarat	Men's doubles
Bronze medal – third place	2018 Hamilton	Mixed doubles
Oceania Mixed Team Championships
Silver medal – second place	2010 Invercargill	Mixed team
Silver medal – second place	2012 Ballarat	Mixed team
Silver medal – second place	2014 Ballarat	Mixed team
Silver medal – second place	2016 Auckland	Mixed team
Silver medal – second place	2019 Melbourne	Mixed team
Oceania Men's Team Championships
Gold medal – first place	2012 Ballarat	Men's team
Gold medal – first place	2016 Auckland	Men's team
Silver medal – second place	2010 Invercargill	Men's team
Silver medal – second place	2018 Hamilton	Men's team
Silver medal – second place	2020 Ballarat	Men's team

Oliver Leydon-Davis (born 10 May 1990) is a New Zealand badminton player. He won the Oceania Championships title in the mixed doubles in 2014, and in the men's doubles in 2020.

== Achievements ==
=== Oceania Championships ===
Men's doubles
Year	Venue	Partner	Opponent	Score	Result
2010	Stadium Southland; Invercargill, New Zealand	(New Zealand) Henry Tam	(Australia) Ross Smith (Australia) Glenn Warfe	19–21, 12–21	Silver
2012	Ken Kay Badminton Hall; Ballarat, Australia	(New Zealand) Kevin Dennerly-Minturn	(Australia) Ross Smith (Australia) Glenn Warfe	17–21, 18–21	Silver
2014	Ken Kay Badminton Hall; Ballarat, Australia	(New Zealand) Kevin Dennerly-Minturn	(Australia) Matthew Chau (Australia) Sawan Serasinghe	15–21, 19–21	Bronze
2015	X-TRM North Harbour Badminton Centre; Auckland, New Zealand	(New Zealand) Kevin Dennerly-Minturn	(Australia) Matthew Chau (Australia) Sawan Serasinghe	21–10, 16–21, 13–21	Silver
2020	Ken Kay Badminton Stadium; Ballarat, Australia	(New Zealand) Abhinav Manota	(Australia) Matthew Chau (Australia) Sawan Serasinghe	18–21, 21–9, 21–14	Gold

Mixed doubles
Year	Venue	Partner	Opponent	Score	Result
2014	Ken Kay Badminton Hall; Ballarat, Australia	(New Zealand) Susannah Leydon-Davis	(Australia) Matthew Chau (Australia) Jacqueline Guan	21–19, 21–13	Gold
2015	X-TRM North Harbour Badminton Centre; Auckland, New Zealand	(New Zealand) Danielle Tahuri	(Australia) Robin Middleton (Australia) Leanne Choo	12–21, 14–21	Silver
2018	Eastlink Badminton Stadium; Hamilton, New Zealand	(New Zealand) Susannah Leydon-Davis	(Australia) Sawan Serasinghe (Australia) Setyana Mapasa	12–21, 19–21	Bronze
2022	Melbourne Sports and Aquatic Centre; Melbourne, Australia	(New Zealand) Anona Pak	(Australia) Kenneth Choo (Australia) Gronya Somerville	18–21, 21–19, 12–21	Silver

=== BWF International Challenge/Series (8 titles, 10 runners-up) ===
Men's doubles
Year	Tournament	Partner	Opponent	Score	Result
2009	Nouméa International	(New Zealand) Henry Tam	(New Zealand) Kevin Dennerly-Minturn (New Zealand) Joe Wu	21–17, 22–24, 21–16	(gold) Winner
2010	Canterbury International	(New Zealand) Bjorn Seguin	(United States) Daniel Gouw (United States) Arnold Setiadi	19–21, 19–21	(silver) Runner-up
2010	Tahiti International	(New Zealand) Maoni Hu He	(Australia) Ross Smith (Australia) Glenn Warfe	11–21, 12–21	(silver) Runner-up
2011	Altona International	(New Zealand) Kevin Dennerly-Minturn	(Australia) Ross Smith (Australia) Glenn Warfe	17–21, 13–21	(silver) Runner-up
2012	Auckland International	(New Zealand) Kevin Dennerly-Minturn	(England) Tom Armstrong (New Zealand) Tjitte Weistra	21–18, 22–20	(gold) Winner
2013	Internacional Mexicano	(New Zealand) Kevin Dennerly-Minturn	(Mexico) Job Castillo (Mexico) Antonio Ocegueda	17–21, 21–12, 21–6	(gold) Winner
2016	Norwegian International	(Denmark) Lasse Mølhede	(India) Akshay Dewalkar (India) Tarun Kona	21–18, 22–20	(gold) Winner
2017	Dutch International	(Denmark) Lasse Mølhede	(Netherlands) Jim Middelburg (Netherlands) Russell Muns	18–21, 21–10, 24–22	(gold) Winner
2018	Swedish Open	(Denmark) Lasse Mølhede	(Scotland) Martin Campbell (Scotland) Patrick MacHugh	21–17, 21–12	(gold) Winner
2018	North Harbour International	(New Zealand) Kevin Dennerly-Minturn	(New Zealand) Jonathan Curtin (New Zealand) Dhanny Oud	21–13, 21–14	(gold) Winner
2018	Austrian International	(Denmark) Lasse Mølhede	(Chinese Taipei) Lu Chen (Chinese Taipei) Ye Hong-wei	23–25, 17–21	(silver) Runner-up
2019	Dutch International	(New Zealand) Abhinav Manota	(Denmark) Daniel Lundgaard (Denmark) Mathias Thyrri	16–21, 21–15, 14–21	(silver) Runner-up
2019	Hellas Open	(New Zealand) Abhinav Manota	(France) Éloi Adam (France) Julien Maio	18–21, 18–21	(silver) Runner-up
2019	Bulgarian Open	(New Zealand) Abhinav Manota	(France) Éloi Adam (France) Julien Maio	21–10, 16–21, 12–21	(silver) Runner-up

Mixed doubles
Year	Tournament	Partner	Opponent	Score	Result
2010	Canterbury International	(New Zealand) Louise McKenzie	(New Zealand) Joe Wu (New Zealand) Donna Haliday	19–21, 21–19, 25–23	(gold) Winner
2011	Norwegian International	(New Zealand) Susannah Leydon-Davis	(New Zealand) Daniel Shirley (New Zealand) Gabby Aves	11–21, 17–21	(silver) Runner-up
2017	Yonex / K&D Graphics International	(New Zealand) Susannah Leydon-Davis	(Canada) Nyl Yakura (Canada) Kristen Tsai	11–21, 8–21	(silver) Runner-up
2019	Sydney International	(New Zealand) Anona Pak	(Philippines) Peter Gabriel Magnaye (Philippines) Thea Pomar	9–21, 19–21	(silver) Runner-up

BWF International Challenge tournament
BWF International Series tournament
BWF Future Series tournament
