= Chen Hsuan-yu =

Australian badminton player (born 1993)

Chen Hsuan-yu 陈煊渝
Personal information
- Born: 1 June 1993 (age 33) Taichung, Taiwan
- Height: 1.67 m (5 ft 6 in)
- Weight: 60 kg (132 lb)

Sport
- Country: Australia
- Sport: Badminton
- Handedness: Right

Women's singles
- Highest ranking: 55 (26 November 2015)
- Current ranking: 73 (13 December 2022)
- BWF profile
Medal record
Women's badminton
Representing Australia
Oceania Championships
Gold medal – first place	2015 North Harbour	Women's singles
Gold medal – first place	2016 Papeete	Women's singles
Gold medal – first place	2017 Nouméa	Women's singles
Gold medal – first place	2018 Hamilton	Women's singles
Gold medal – first place	2019 Melbourne	Women's singles
Gold medal – first place	2020 Ballarat	Women's singles
Gold medal – first place	2022 Melbourne	Women's singles
Bronze medal – third place	2015 North Harbour	Women's doubles
Bronze medal – third place	2017 Nouméa	Mixed doubles
Oceania Mixed Team Championships
Gold medal – first place	2019 Melbourne	Mixed team
Oceania Women's Team Championships
Gold medal – first place	2018 Hamilton	Women's team
Gold medal – first place	2020 Ballarat	Women's team

Wendy Chen Hsuan-yu (simplified Chinese: 陈煊渝; traditional Chinese: 陳煊渝; born 1 June 1993) is an Australian badminton player who has represented her country at the 2016 Rio and 2020 Tokyo Olympic Games.

== Career ==
Badminton was the family sport and all of Chen's family played. She excelled in her high school years and represented her school in both junior and senior Badminton events. She then turned professional and made her International debut for badminton in 2012.

At the 2016 Rio Olympics, Chen made her Olympic debut representing Australia. Her opponents were Thailand's Porntip Buranaprasertsuk and Mauritius' Kate Foo Kune and in spite of a good contest she lost to both.

In 2017, Chen won the Casa Del Sole Nouméa International. In 2018, she represented Australia at the Commonwealth Games in Gold Coast, Australia. In early 2020, she won the women's singles titles at the Oceania Championships in six consecutive years from 2015 to 2020.

Chen played at the 2020 Tokyo Olympics, and was knocked out in the group stage after finishing second in her group.

== Achievements ==
=== Oceania Championships ===
Women's singles
Year	Venue	Opponent	Score	Result	Ref.
2015	X-TRM North Harbour Badminton Centre, Auckland, New Zealand	(Australia) Joy Lai	21–18, 24–22	Gold	
2016	Punaauia University Hall, Papeete, Tahiti	(Australia) Joy Lai	21–13, 21–15	Gold	
2017	Salle Anewy, Nouméa, New Caledonia	(Australia) Tiffany Ho	21–18, 21–11	Gold	
2018	Eastlink Badminton Stadium, Hamilton, New Zealand	(Australia) Louisa Ma	21–7, 21–14	Gold	
2019	Melbourne Sports and Aquatic Centre, Melbourne, Australia	(Australia) Yingzi Jiang	17–21, 21–16, 23–21	Gold	
2020	Ken Kay Badminton Stadium, Ballarat, Australia	(Australia) Louisa Ma	21–15, 21–11	Gold	
2022	Melbourne Sports and Aquatic Centre, Melbourne, Australia	(Australia) Louisa Ma	21–17, 21–18	Gold	

Women's doubles
Year	Venue	Partner	Opponent	Score	Result	Ref.
2015	X-TRM North Harbour Badminton Centre; Auckland, New Zealand	(Australia) Louisa Ma	(Australia) Leanne Choo (Australia) Gronya Somerville	18–21, 16–21	Bronze	

Mixed doubles
Year	Venue	Partner	Opponent	Score	Result	Ref.
2017	Salle Anewy; Nouméa, New Caledonia	(Australia) Mitchell Wheller	(Australia) Joel Findlay (Australia) Gronya Somerville	12–21, 19–21	Bronze	

=== BWF International Challenge/Series (1 title, 6 runners-up) ===
Women's singles
Year	Tournament	Opponent	Score	Result	Ref.
2015	Maribyrnong International	(Malaysia) Julia Wong Pei Xian	22–20, 19–21, 14–21	(silver) Runner-up	
2016	Waikato International	(Vietnam) Vũ Thị Trang	12–21, 15–21	(silver) Runner-up	
2017	Nouméa International	(Australia) Joy Lai	21–16, 21–9	(gold) Winner	

Women's doubles
Year	Tournament	Partner	Opponent	Score	Result	Ref.
2015	Maribyrnong International	(Chinese Taipei) Lin Shu-yu	(Australia) Setyana Mapasa (Australia) Gronya Somerville	22–20, 17–21, 18–21	(silver) Runner-up	
2017	Sydney International	(Australia) Sylvina Kurniawan	(Chinese Taipei) Hung En-tzu (Chinese Taipei) Lin Jhih-yun	19–21, 19–21	(silver) Runner-up	
2021	Irish Open	(Australia) Gronya Somerville	(Netherlands) Debora Jille (Netherlands) Cheryl Seinen	21–15, 14–21, 14–21	(silver) Runner-up	
2022	North Harbour International	(Australia) Gronya Somerville	(Chinese Taipei) Sung Shuo-yun (Chinese Taipei) Yu Chien-hui	19–21, 17–21	(silver) Runner-up	

BWF International Challenge tournament
BWF International Series tournament
BWF Future Series tournament
