= Niccolo Tagle =

New Zealand badminton player (born 1997)

Personal information
- Born: 1 March 1997 (age 29)

Sport
- Country: New Zealand
- Sport: Badminton

Men's singles & doubles
- Highest ranking: 205 (MS 9 March 2017); 185 (MD 15 June 2017); 243 (XD 5 July 2018)
- BWF profile
Medal record
Men's badminton
Representing New Zealand
Oceania Championships
Silver medal – second place	2017 Nouméa	Men's singles
Silver medal – second place	2017 Nouméa	Men's doubles
Bronze medal – third place	2018 Hamilton	Mixed doubles
Oceania Mixed Team Championships
Silver medal – second place	2016 Auckland	Mixed team
Oceania Men's Team Championships
Gold medal – first place	2016 Auckland	Men's team
Silver medal – second place	2020 Ballarat	Men's team
Oceania Junior Championships
Gold medal – first place	2015 Auckland	Boys' doubles
Silver medal – second place	2015 Auckland	Mixed team

Niccolo Tagle (born 1 March 1997) is a New Zealand badminton player. He was the 2015 Oceania Junior Champion in the boys' doubles event partnered with Daxxon Vong. In 2017, he won the silver medals at the Oceania Championships in the men's singles and doubles event.

== Achievements ==
=== Oceania Championships ===
Men's singles
Year	Venue	Opponent	Score	Result
2017	Salle Anewy; Nouméa, New Caledonia	(Australia) Pit Seng Low	17–21, 21–13, 13–21	Silver

Men's doubles
Year	Venue	Partner	Opponent	Score	Result
2017	Salle Anewy; Nouméa, New Caledonia	(New Zealand) Kevin Dennerly-Minturn	(Australia) Matthew Chau (Australia) Sawan Serasinghe	8–21, 14–21	Silver

Mixed doubles
Year	Venue	Partner	Opponent	Score	Result
2018	Eastlink Badminton Stadium; Hamilton, New Zealand	(New Zealand) Alyssa Tagle	(Australia) Matthew Chau (Australia) Leanne Choo	5–21, 9–21	Bronze

=== Oceania Junior Championships ===
Boys' doubles
Year	Venue	Partner	Opponent	Score	Result
2015	X-TRM North Harbour Badminton Centre; Auckland, New Zealand	(New Zealand) Daxxon Vong	(New Zealand) Oscar Guo (New Zealand) Christopher Steeghs	21–14, 21–18	Gold
