= Danielle Tahuri =

New Zealand badminton player (born 1988)

Personal information
- Born: Danielle Barry; 22 December 1988 (age 37)
- Height: 1.70 m (5 ft 7 in)
- Weight: 54 kg (119 lb)

Sport
- Country: New Zealand
- Sport: Badminton

Women's & mixed doubles
- Highest ranking: 30 (WD 15 July 2010); 54 (XD 15 July 2010)
- BWF profile
Medal record
Women's badminton
Representing New Zealand
Oceania Championships
Silver medal – second place	2015 North Harbour	Mixed doubles
Bronze medal – third place	2010 Invercargill	Women's doubles
Bronze medal – third place	2015 North Harbour	Women's doubles
Bronze medal – third place	2017 Nouméa	Women's doubles
Bronze medal – third place	2017 Nouméa	Mixed doubles
Bronze medal – third place	2018 Hamilton	Women's doubles
Oceania Mixed Team Championships
Gold medal – first place	2008 Nouméa	Mixed team
Silver medal – second place	2010 Invercargill	Mixed team
Silver medal – second place	2016 Auckland	Mixed team
Oceania Women's Team Championships
Gold medal – first place	2008 Nouméa	Women's team
Silver medal – second place	2010 Invercargill	Women's team
Silver medal – second place	2016 Auckland	Women's team
Silver medal – second place	2018 Hamilton	Women's team

Danielle Tahuri (born 22 December 1988; as Danielle Barry) is a New Zealand badminton player who plays for the Te Atatu badminton club. In 2010, she competed at the Badminton at the 2010 Commonwealth Games. In 2015, she reach the mixed doubles final at the Oceania Championships and won silver. She also won the women's doubles bronze in 2010, 2015 and 2017; and the mixed doubles bronze in 2017.

== Achievements ==
=== Oceania Championships ===
Women's doubles
Year	Venue	Partner	Opponent	Score	Result
2010	Stadium Southland; Invercargill, New Zealand	(New Zealand) Donna Haliday	(Australia) Leanne Choo (Australia) Kate Wilson-Smith	13–21, 12–21	Bronze
2015	X-TRM North Harbour Badminton Centre; Auckland, New Zealand	(New Zealand) Emma Chapple	(Australia) Talia Saunders (Australia) Jennifer Tam	18–21, 16–21	Bronze
2017	Salle Anewy; Nouméa, New Caledonia	(New Zealand) Susannah Leydon-Davis	(Australia) Setyana Mapasa (Australia) Gronya Somerville	15–21, 7–21	Bronze
2018	Eastlink Badminton Stadium; Hamilton, New Zealand	(New Zealand) Anona Pak	(Australia) Setyana Mapasa (Australia) Gronya Somerville	9–21, 21–18, 10–21	Bronze

Mixed doubles
Year	Venue	Partner	Opponent	Score	Result
2015	X-TRM North Harbour Badminton Centre; Auckland, New Zealand	(New Zealand) Oliver Leydon-Davis	(Australia) Robin Middleton (Australia) Leanne Choo	12–21, 14–21	Silver
2017	Salle Anewy; Nouméa, New Caledonia	(New Zealand) Kevin Dennerly-Minturn	(Australia) Sawan Serasinghe (Australia) Setyana Mapasa	8–21, 11–21	Bronze

=== BWF International Challenge/Series ===
Women's singles
Year	Tournament	Opponent	Score	Result
2009	Nouméa International	(Mexico) Deyanira Angulo	17–21, 21–16, 19–21	(silver) Runner-up

Women's doubles
Year	Tournament	Partner	Opponent	Score	Result
2009	Victoria International	(New Zealand) Donna Haliday	(Australia) Erin Carroll (Australia) Renuga Veeran	21–16, 19–21, 20–22	(silver) Runner-up
2009	Nouméa International	(New Zealand) Donna Haliday	(Mexico) Deyanira Angulo (Australia) Louise McKenzie	21–5, 21–11	(gold) Winner
2009	Cyprus International	(New Zealand) Donna Haliday	(Russia) Anastasia Chervyakova (Russia) Natalia Perminova	18–21, 20–22	(silver) Runner-up

Mixed doubles
Year	Tournament	Partner	Opponent	Score	Result
2008	North Shore City International	(New Zealand) Joe Wu	(New Zealand) Henry Tam (New Zealand) Donna Haliday	14–21, 12–21	(silver) Runner-up

BWF International Challenge tournament
BWF International Series tournament
BWF Future Series tournament
