= Tiffany Ho (badminton) =

Australian badminton player (born 1998)

Personal information
- Born: Tiffany Celine Ho; 6 January 1998 (age 28) Westmead, Sydney, New South Wales, Australia
- Height: 1.55 m (5 ft 1 in)

Sport
- Country: Australia
- Sport: Badminton
- Handedness: Right

Women's singles & doubles
- Highest ranking: 80 (WS, 2 July 2024); 131 (WD with Gronya Somerville, 23 July 2024); 108 (XD, 7 September 2017)
- Current ranking: 81 (WS); 131 (WD with Gronya Somerville) (23 July 2024)
- BWF profile
Medal record
Women's badminton
Representing Australia
Oceania Championships
Gold medal – first place	2016 Papeete	Women's doubles
Gold medal – first place	2024 Geelong	Women's singles
Silver medal – second place	2017 Nouméa	Women's singles
Silver medal – second place	2017 Nouméa	Women's doubles
Silver medal – second place	2023 Auckland	Women's singles
Silver medal – second place	2023 Auckland	Women's doubles
Silver medal – second place	2025 Auckland	Women's singles
Silver medal – second place	2026 Auckland	Women's singles
Bronze medal – third place	2016 Papeete	Women's singles
Bronze medal – third place	2016 Papeete	Mixed doubles
Bronze medal – third place	2020 Ballarat	Women's singles
Bronze medal – third place	2020 Ballarat	Women's doubles
Bronze medal – third place	2022 Melbourne	Women's singles
Oceania Mixed Team Championships
Gold medal – first place	2023 Auckland	Mixed team
Gold medal – first place	2025 Auckland	Mixed team
Oceania Women's Team Championships
Gold medal – first place	2020 Ballarat	Women's team
Gold medal – first place	2024 Geelong	Women's team
Gold medal – first place	2026 Auckland	Women's team

Tiffany Celine Ho (born 6 January 1998) is an Australian badminton player. She won the women's doubles title at the Oceania Championships in 2016 partnered with Jennifer Tam, and then crowned as the women's singles champion in 2024. She claimed her first international title at the Waikato International tournament in the women's doubles event. Ho was part of Australia team that won the Oceania Women's Team Championships in 2020 and 2024, and also the Oceania Mixed Team Championships in 2023. She competed for Australia at the 2022 Commonwealth Games and the 2024 Summer Olympics.

== Personal life ==
Ho parents were born in Hong Kong. She graduated as a registered nurse, and works at the Concord Hospital.

== Achievements ==
=== Oceania Championships ===
Women's singles
Year	Venue	Opponent	Score	Result
2016	Punaauia University Hall, Papeete, Tahiti	(Australia) Joy Lai	22–20, 14–21, 15–21	Bronze
2017	Salle Anewy, Nouméa, New Caledonia	(Australia) Chen Hsuan-yu	18–21, 11–21	Silver
2020	Ken Kay Badminton Stadium, Ballarat, Australia	(Australia) Louisa Ma	17–21, 19–21	Bronze
2022	Melbourne Sports and Aquatic Centre, Melbourne, Australia	(Australia) Louisa Ma	21–14, 19–21, 11–21	Bronze
2023	Auckland Badminton Stadium, Auckland, New Zealand	(New Zealand) Shaunna Li	22–24, 21–18, 12–21	Silver
2024	Leisuretime Sports Precinct, Geelong, Australia	(Australia) Zhang Yuelin	22–20, 21–12	Gold
2025	Badminton North Harbour Centre, Auckland, New Zealand	(New Zealand) Shaunna Li	25–23, 10–21, 18–21	Silver
2026	Badminton North Harbour Centre, Auckland, New Zealand	(New Zealand) Shaunna Li	14–21, 14–21	Silver

Women's doubles
Year	Venue	Partner	Opponent	Score	Result
2016	Punaauia University Hall, Papeete, Tahiti	(Australia) Jennifer Tam	(Australia) Gronya Somerville (Australia) Melinda Sun	21–17, 19–21, 22–20	Gold
2017	Salle Anewy, Nouméa, New Caledonia	(Australia) Joy Lai	(Australia) Setyana Mapasa (Australia) Gronya Somerville	21–16, 18–21, 14–21	Silver
2020	Ken Kay Badminton Stadium, Ballarat, Australia	(Australia) Jodee Vega	(Australia) Setyana Mapasa (Australia) Gronya Somerville	10–21, 13–21	Bronze
2023	Auckland Badminton Stadium, Auckland, New Zealand	(Australia) Khoo Lee Yen	(Australia) Sylvina Kurniawan (Australia) Setyana Mapasa	7–21, 9–21	Silver

Mixed doubles
Year	Venue	Partner	Opponent	Score	Result
2016	Punaauia University Hall, Papeete, Tahiti	(Australia) Simon Leung	(Australia) Anthony Joe (Australia) Joy Lai	11–21, 18–21	Bronze

=== BWF International Challenge/Series ===
Women's doubles
Year	Tournament	Partner	Opponent	Score	Result
2016	Waikato International	(Australia) Jennifer Tam	(New Zealand) Vicki Copeland (New Zealand) Anona Pak	21–19, 18–21, 21–12	(gold) Winner
2017	Nouméa International	(Australia) Joy Lai	(Australia) Setyana Mapasa (Australia) Gronya Somerville	11–21, 8–21	(silver) Runner-up

BWF International Challenge tournament
BWF International Series tournament
BWF Future Series tournament
