= Matthew Chau =

Australian badminton player (born 1994)

Matthew Chau 曹善凯
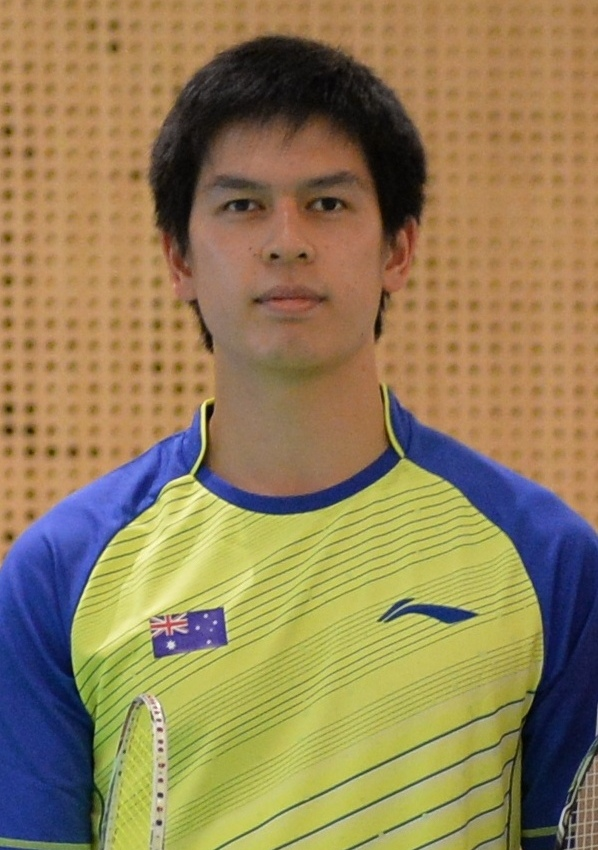
- Chau in 2016

Personal information
- Born: 9 November 1994 (age 32) Mount Waverley, Victoria, Australia
- Height: 1.85 m (6 ft 1 in)
- Weight: 77 kg (170 lb)

Sport
- Country: Australia
- Sport: Badminton
- Handedness: Right

Men's & mixed doubles
- Highest ranking: 32 (MD 1 December 2016); 55 (XD 1 September 2016)
- BWF profile
Medal record
Men's badminton
Representing Australia
Oceania Championships
Gold medal – first place	2015 North Harbour	Men's doubles
Gold medal – first place	2016 Papeete	Men's doubles
Gold medal – first place	2017 Nouméa	Men's doubles
Gold medal – first place	2018 Hamilton	Men's doubles
Silver medal – second place	2014 Ballarat	Men's doubles
Silver medal – second place	2014 Ballarat	Mixed doubles
Silver medal – second place	2018 Hamilton	Mixed doubles
Silver medal – second place	2020 Ballarat	Men's doubles
Bronze medal – third place	2015 North Harbour	Mixed doubles
Oceania Mixed Team Championships
Gold medal – first place	2014 Ballarat	Mixed team
Gold medal – first place	2016 Auckland	Mixed team
Gold medal – first place	2019 Melbourne	Mixed team
Oceania Men's Team Championships
Gold medal – first place	2018 Hamilton	Men's team
Gold medal – first place	2020 Ballarat	Men's team

Matthew Chau (born 9 November 1994) is an Australian badminton player. He was four times men's doubles Oceania Champion winning in 2015–2018. Chau competed in the men's doubles at the 2016 Summer Olympics alongside Sawan Serasinghe.

Matthew Chau picked up his first badminton racquet at age 10, following his parents to the Monash University Badminton Club where they played socially. The now 22-year-old fell in love with the all rounded nature of the sport and says he enjoys that badminton demands speed, strength, endurance, skill, tactical smarts and hard work from its athletes. Chau first partnered with Serasinghe at the 2013 Australian Youth Olympic Festival and the duo went on to secure the Rio quota spot for Australia by winning the 2016 Oceania Championships title.

Chau also took home the men's doubles title with Serasinghe at the Waikato International tournament and competed at his first World Championships 2016 at just 20 years old in Jakarta, Indonesia.

When he is not playing, Chau studies a Bachelor of Commerce and Bachelor of Engineering and enjoys cooking.

== Achievements ==
=== Oceania Championships ===
Men's doubles
Year	Venue	Partner	Opponent	Score	Result
2020	Ken Kay Badminton Stadium; Ballarat, Australia	(Australia) Sawan Serasinghe	(New Zealand) Oliver Leydon-Davis (New Zealand) Abhinav Manota	21–18, 9–21, 14–21	Silver
2018	Eastlink Badminton Stadium; Hamilton, New Zealand	(Australia) Sawan Serasinghe	(Australia) Robin Middleton (Australia) Ross Smith	21–17, 23–21	Gold
2017	Salle Anewy; Nouméa, New Caledonia	(Australia) Sawan Serasinghe	(New Zealand) Kevin Dennerly-Minturn (New Zealand) Niccolo Tagle	21–8, 21–14	Gold
2016	Punaauia University Hall; Papeete, Tahiti	(Australia) Sawan Serasinghe	(French Polynesia) Léo Cucuel (French Polynesia) Rémi Rossi	21–11, 21–12	Gold
2015	X-TRM North Harbour Badminton Centre; Auckland, New Zealand	(Australia) Sawan Serasinghe	(New Zealand) Kevin Dennerly-Minturn (New Zealand) Oliver Leydon-Davis	10–21, 21–16, 21–13	Gold
2014	Ken Kay Badminton Hall; Ballarat, Australia	(Australia) Sawan Serasinghe	(Australia) Raymond Tam (Australia) Glenn Warfe	11–21, 13–21	Silver

Mixed doubles
Year	Venue	Partner	Opponent	Score	Result
2018	Eastlink Badminton Stadium; Hamilton, New Zealand	(Australia) Leanne Choo	(Australia) Sawan Serasinghe (Australia) Setyana Mapasa	19–21, 18–21	Silver
2015	X-TRM North Harbour Badminton Centre; Auckland, New Zealand	(Australia) Gronya Somerville	(New Zealand) Oliver Leydon-Davis (New Zealand) Danielle Tahuri	15–21, 21–19, 14–21	Bronze
2014	Ken Kay Badminton Hall; Ballarat, Australia	(Australia) Jacqueline Guan	(New Zealand) Oliver Leydon-Davis (New Zealand) Susannah Leydon-Davis	19–21, 13–21	Silver

=== BWF International Challenge/Series (2 titles, 3 runners-up) ===
Men's doubles
Year	Tournament	Partner	Opponent	Score	Result
2017	Nouméa International	(Australia) Sawan Serasinghe	(Australia) Joel Findlay (Australia) Jeff Tho	17–21, 21–7, 21–14	(gold) Winner
2015	Maribyrnong International	(Australia) Sawan Serasinghe	(Malaysia) Darren Isaac Devadass (Malaysia) Vountus Indra Mawan	24–22, 10–21, 14–21	(silver) Runner-up
2015	Waikato International	(Australia) Sawan Serasinghe	(Pakistan) Rizwan Azam (Australia) Michael Fariman	21–16, 21–15	(gold) Winner

Mixed doubles
Year	Tournament	Partner	Opponent	Score	Result
2015	Turkey International	(Australia) Gronya Somerville	(Poland) Robert Mateusiak (Poland) Nadieżda Zięba	12–21, 13–21	(silver) Runner-up
2015	Waikato International	(Australia) Gronya Somerville	(Australia) Sawan Serasinghe (Australia) Setyana Mapasa	13–21, 17–21	(silver) Runner-up

BWF International Challenge tournament
BWF International Series tournament
BWF Future Series tournament
