= Sawan Serasinghe =

Sri Lanka-born Australian badminton player (born 1994)

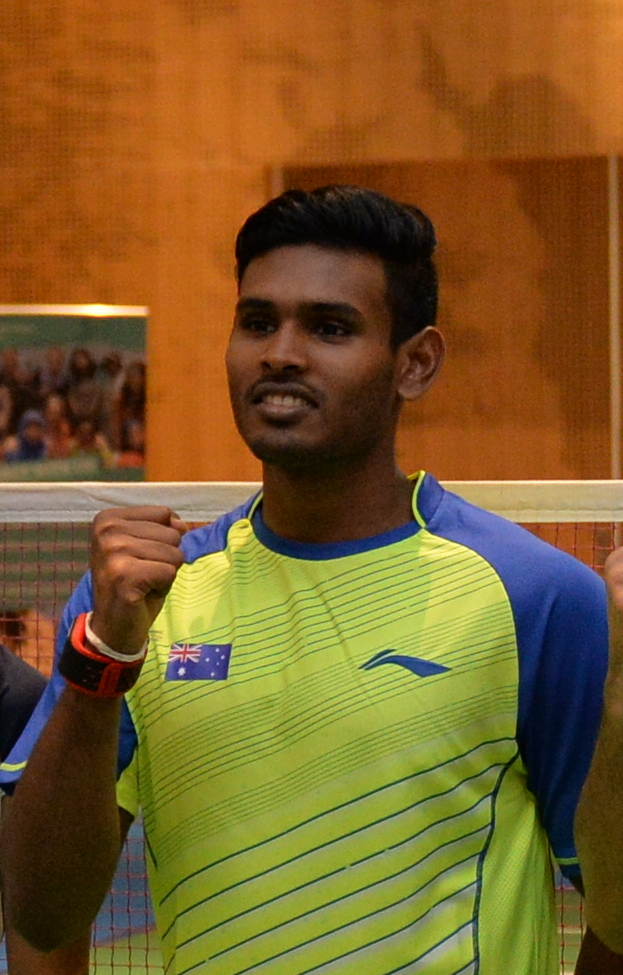

Personal information
- Born: 21 February 1994 (age 32) Galle, Sri Lanka
- Height: 1.78 m (5 ft 10 in)
- Weight: 79 kg (174 lb)

Sport
- Country: Australia
- Sport: Badminton
- Handedness: Left

Men's & mixed doubles
- Highest ranking: 32 (MD 1 December 2016); 32 (XD 19 October 2017)
- BWF profile
Medal record
Men's badminton
Representing Australia
Oceania Championships
Gold medal – first place	2015 North Harbour	Men's doubles
Gold medal – first place	2016 Papeete	Men's doubles
Gold medal – first place	2017 Nouméa	Men's doubles
Gold medal – first place	2017 Nouméa	Mixed doubles
Gold medal – first place	2018 Hamilton	Men's doubles
Gold medal – first place	2018 Hamilton	Mixed doubles
Gold medal – first place	2019 Melbourne	Men's doubles
Silver medal – second place	2014 Ballarat	Men's doubles
Silver medal – second place	2019 Melbourne	Mixed doubles
Silver medal – second place	2020 Ballarat	Men's doubles
Oceania Mixed Team Championships
Gold medal – first place	2014 Ballarat	Mixed team
Gold medal – first place	2016 Auckland	Mixed team
Oceania Men's Team Championships
Gold medal – first place	2018 Hamilton	Men's team
Gold medal – first place	2020 Ballarat	Men's team

Sawan Serasinghe (born 21 February 1994) is a former badminton player from Australia. He won seven Oceania Championships titles, five in the men's doubles and two in the mixed doubles. Serasinghe competed in the men's doubles event at the 2016 Summer Olympics alongside Matthew Chau.

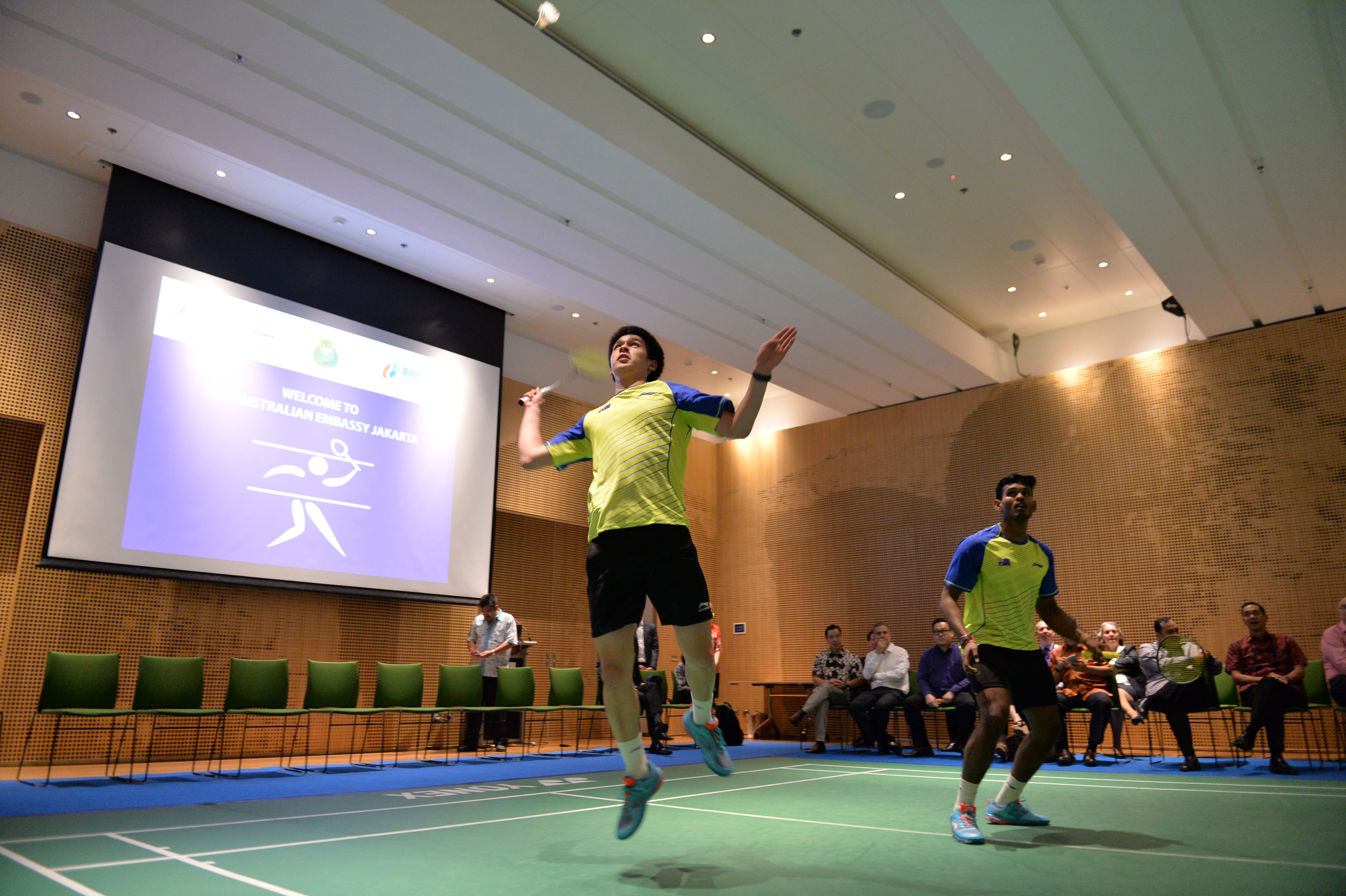
Serasinghe with his partner Matthew Chau in 2016

== Career ==
Serasinghe started playing badminton since the age of five, he was born in Galle, Sri Lanka, and moved to Australia when he was 11 years old. He trains at the National Training Centre in Melbourne, and took out back-to-back Oceania Championships titles with Chau in 2015 and 2016. The 22-year-old also won the 2014 Sydney International Challenge mixed doubles with Setyana Mapasa, against some of the best players in the world. The Melburnian's first international experience was at the 2013 Australian Youth Olympic Festival where he competed in the men's doubles with Chau and also took the court in the men's singles competition.

He made his first Olympic appearance at the 2016 Summer Olympics, competing in the men's doubles with Matthew Chau. They headed into Rio as the 46th highest ranked pairing in the world, and were eliminated in the group stages after losing each of their matches against South Korea, Russia, and Chinese Taipei.

Off the court, Serasinghe holds a Bachelor of Business Information Systems degree from Monash University.

== Achievements ==
=== Oceania Championships ===
Men's doubles
Year	Venue	Partner	Opponent	Score	Result
2020	Ken Kay Badminton Stadium; Ballarat, Australia	(Australia) Matthew Chau	(New Zealand) Oliver Leydon-Davis (New Zealand) Abhinav Manota	21–18, 9–21, 14–21	Silver
2019	Melbourne Sports and Aquatic Centre; Melbourne, Australia	(Australia) Eric Vuong	(Australia) Simon Leung (Australia) Mitchell Wheller	21–17, 21–10	Gold
2018	Eastlink Badminton Stadium; Hamilton, New Zealand	(Australia) Matthew Chau	(Australia) Robin Middleton (Australia) Ross Smith	21–17, 23–21	Gold
2017	Salle Anewy; Nouméa, New Caledonia	(Australia) Matthew Chau	(New Zealand) Kevin Dennerly-Minturn (New Zealand) Niccolo Tagle	21–8, 21–14	Gold
2016	Punaauia University Hall; Papeete, Tahiti	(Australia) Matthew Chau	(French Polynesia) Leo Cucuel (French Polynesia) Remi Rossi	21–11, 21–12	Gold
2015	X-TRM North Harbour Badminton Centre; Auckland, New Zealand	(Australia) Matthew Chau	(New Zealand) Kevin Dennerly-Minturn (New Zealand) Oliver Leydon-Davis	10–21, 21–16, 21–13	Gold
2014	Ken Kay Badminton Hall; Ballarat, Australia	(Australia) Matthew Chau	(Australia) Raymond Tam (Australia) Glenn Warfe	11–21, 13–21	Silver

Mixed doubles
Year	Venue	Partner	Opponent	Score	Result
2019	Melbourne Sports and Aquatic Centre; Melbourne, Australia	(Australia) Khoo Lee Yen	(Australia) Simon Leung (Australia) Gronya Somerville	18–21, 15–21	Silver
2018	Eastlink Badminton Stadium; Hamilton, New Zealand	(Australia) Setyana Mapasa	(Australia) Matthew Chau (Australia) Leanne Choo	21–19, 21–18	Gold
2017	Salle Anewy; Nouméa, New Caledonia	(Australia) Setyana Mapasa	(Australia) Joel Findlay (Australia) Gronya Somerville	21–19, 21–9	Gold

=== BWF Grand Prix (1 runner-up) ===
The BWF Grand Prix has two levels, the BWF Grand Prix and Grand Prix Gold. It is a series of badminton tournaments sanctioned by the Badminton World Federation (BWF) since 2007.

Mixed doubles
Year	Tournament	Partner	Opponent	Score	Result
2017	New Zealand Open	(Australia) Setyana Mapasa	(Indonesia) Ronald Alexander (Indonesia) Annisa Saufika	19–21, 14–21	(silver) Runner-up

BWF Grand Prix Gold tournament
BWF Grand Prix tournament

=== BWF International Challenge/Series (6 titles, 3 runners-up) ===
Men's doubles
Year	Tournament	Partner	Opponent	Score	Result
2017	Nouméa International	(Australia) Matthew Chau	(Australia) Joel Findlay (Australia) Jeff Tho	17–21, 21–7, 21–14	(gold) Winner
2015	Maribyrnong International	(Australia) Matthew Chau	(Malaysia) Darren Isaac Devadass (Malaysia) Vountus Indra Mawan	24–22, 10–21, 14–21	(silver) Runner-up
2015	Waikato International	(Australia) Matthew Chau	(Pakistan) Rizwan Azam (Australia) Michael Fariman	21–16, 21–15	(gold) Winner

Mixed doubles
Year	Tournament	Partner	Opponent	Score	Result
2017	Sydney International	(Australia) Setyana Mapasa	(Chinese Taipei) Ye Hong-wei (Chinese Taipei) Teng Chun-hsun	Walkover	(silver) Runner-up
2017	Nouméa International	(Australia) Setyana Mapasa	(New Zealand) Dylan Soedjasa (New Zealand) Susannah Leydon-Davis	21–13, 15–21, 21–17	(gold) Winner
2015	Norwegian International	(Australia) Setyana Mapasa	(Denmark) Soren Gravholt (Denmark) Maiken Fruergaard	21–17, 21–15	(gold) Winner
2015	Maribyrnong International	(Australia) Setyana Mapasa	(Australia) Robin Middleton (Australia) Leanne Choo	21–17, 19–21, 19–21	(silver) Runner-up
2015	Waikato International	(Australia) Setyana Mapasa	(Australia) Matthew Chau (Australia) Gronya Somerville	21–13, 21–17	(gold) Winner
2014	Sydney International	(Australia) Setyana Mapasa	(Australia) Pham Tran Hoang (Indonesia) Sylvina Kurniawan	11–4, 11–8, 11–3	(gold) Winner

BWF International Challenge tournament
BWF International Series tournament
BWF Future Series tournament
