= Kevin Dennerly-Minturn =

New Zealand badminton player (born 1989)

Personal information
- Born: Kevin James Dennerly-Minturn; 18 May 1989 (age 37) Greenlane, Auckland, New Zealand
- Height: 1.79 m (5 ft 10 in)
- Weight: 96 kg (212 lb)

Sport
- Country: New Zealand
- Sport: Badminton
- Coached by: Thana Arikrishnan

Men's & mixed doubles
- Highest ranking: 47 (MD 24 April 2014); 78 (XD 21 November 2013)
- BWF profile
Medal record
Men's badminton
Representing New Zealand
Oceania Championships
Silver medal – second place	2012 Ballarat	Men's doubles
Silver medal – second place	2015 North Harbour	Men's doubles
Silver medal – second place	2017 Nouméa	Men's doubles
Bronze medal – third place	2008 Nouméa	Men's doubles
Bronze medal – third place	2008 Nouméa	Mixed doubles
Bronze medal – third place	2014 Ballarat	Men's doubles
Bronze medal – third place	2017 Nouméa	Mixed doubles
Oceania Mixed Team Championships
Silver medal – second place	2010 Invercargill	Mixed team
Silver medal – second place	2012 Ballarat	Mixed team
Silver medal – second place	2014 Ballarat	Mixed team
Silver medal – second place	2016 Auckland	Mixed team
Oceania Men's Team Championships
Gold medal – first place	2012 Ballarat	Men's team
Gold medal – first place	2016 Auckland	Men's team
Silver medal – second place	2010 Invercargill	Men's team
Silver medal – second place	2018 Hamilton	Men's team

Kevin James Dennerly-Minturn (born 18 May 1989) is a New Zealand badminton player. In 2014, he competed at the Commonwealth Games in Glasgow, Scotland.

== Career ==
Dennerly-Minturn is an Auckland player on the international circuit and is also from the College Rifles badminton club. He comes from a sporting family and from an early age he was gifted at a number of sports including cricket but pursued his badminton and is now player in the New Zealand doubles set up. He is based in Denmark for most of the year playing and training in the across Europe

In 2008, he was the semi-finals in the men's and mixed doubles event at the Oceania Championships and won bronze. He also won bronze in 2014 and silver in 2015 in the men's doubles event partnered with Oliver Leydon-Davis. Partner with Oliver, he won the 2012 Auckland and 2013 Mexico International tournaments. In the mixed doubles, he won the Waikato International tournament teamed up with Susannah Leydon-Davis.

In 2017, he won the silver medal at the Oceania Championships in the men's doubles event partnered with Niccolo Tagle. In the mixed doubles event, he teamed-up with Danielle Tahuri, and they reach the semi-final round but was defeated by the top seeds from Australia.

In recent times Kevin has undertaken endurance sports, culminating in the completion of the Western Australia Ironman with a time of 16 hours 43 minutes.

== Achievements ==
=== Oceania Championships ===
Men's doubles
Year	Venue	Partner	Opponent	Score	Result
2008	Salle Veyret; Nouméa, New Caledonia	(New Zealand) Joe Wu	(Australia) Ross Smith (Australia) Glenn Warfe	15–21, 9–21	Bronze
2012	Ken Kay Badminton Hall; Ballarat, Australia	(New Zealand) Oliver Leydon-Davis	(Australia) Ross Smith (Australia) Glenn Warfe	17–21, 18–21	Silver
2014	Ken Kay Badminton Hall; Ballarat, Australia	(New Zealand) Oliver Leydon-Davis	(Australia) Matthew Chau (Australia) Sawan Serasinghe	15–21, 19–21	Bronze
2015	X-TRM North Harbour Badminton Centre; Auckland, New Zealand	(New Zealand) Oliver Leydon-Davis	(Australia) Matthew Chau (Australia) Sawan Serasinghe	21–10, 16–21, 13–21	Silver
2017	Salle Anewy; Nouméa, New Caledonia	(New Zealand) Niccolo Tagle	(Australia) Matthew Chau (Australia) Sawan Serasinghe	8–21, 14–21	Silver

Mixed doubles
Year	Venue	Partner	Opponent	Score	Result
2008	Salle Veyret; Nouméa, New Caledonia	(New Zealand) Emma Rodgers	(New Zealand) Craig Cooper (New Zealand) Renee Flavell	21–19, 17–21, 10–21	Bronze
2017	Salle Anewy; Nouméa, New Caledonia	(New Zealand) Danielle Tahuri	(Australia) Sawan Serasinghe (Australia) Setyana Mapasa	8–21, 11–21	Bronze

=== BWF International Challenge/Series ===
Men's doubles
Year	Tournament	Partner	Opponent	Score	Result
2009	Nouméa International	(New Zealand) Joe Wu	(New Zealand) Oliver Leydon-Davis (New Zealand) Henry Tam	17–21, 24–22, 16–21	(silver) Runner-up
2011	Altona International	(New Zealand) Oliver Leydon-Davis	(Australia) Ross Smith (Australia) Glenn Warfe	17–21, 13–21	(silver) Runner-up
2012	Auckland International	(New Zealand) Oliver Leydon-Davis	(England) Tom Armstrong (New Zealand) Tjitte Weistra	21–18, 22–20	(gold) Winner
2013	Internacional Mexicano	(New Zealand) Oliver Leydon-Davis	(Mexico) Job Castillo (Mexico) Antonio Ocegueda	17–21, 21–12, 21–6	(gold) Winner
2018	North Harbour International	(New Zealand) Oliver Leydon-Davis	(New Zealand) Jonathan Curtin (New Zealand) Dhanny Oud	21–13, 21–14	(gold) Winner

Mixed doubles
Year	Tournament	Partner	Opponent	Score	Result
2009	Nouméa International	(Australia) Louise McKenzie	(New Zealand) Henry Tam (New Zealand) Donna Haliday	19–21, 15–21	(silver) Runner-up
2011	Altona International	(New Zealand) Stephanie Cheng	(Australia) Glenn Warfe (Australia) Leanne Choo	20–22, 11–21	(silver) Runner-up
2016	Waikato International	(New Zealand) Susannah Leydon-Davis	(New Zealand) Abhinav Manota (New Zealand) Justine Villegas	21–13, 21–14	(gold) Winner

BWF International Challenge tournament
BWF International Series tournament
BWF Future Series tournament
