= Joy Lai =

Australian badminton player (born 1998)

Personal information
- Born: Joy Wai-lok Lai; 18 August 1998 (age 28) Victoria, Australia

Sport
- Country: Australia
- Sport: Badminton
- Handedness: Right

Women's singles and doubles
- Highest ranking: 62 (WS 12 November 2015); 106 (WD 23 October 2014); 123 (XD 17 November 2016)
- BWF profile
Medal record
Women's badminton
Representing Australia
Oceania Championships
Silver medal – second place	2015 North Harbour	Women's singles
Silver medal – second place	2016 Papeete	Women's singles
Silver medal – second place	2016 Papeete	Mixed doubles
Silver medal – second place	2017 Nouméa	Women's doubles
Bronze medal – third place	2014 Ballarat	Women's singles
Bronze medal – third place	2017 Nouméa	Women's singles
Bronze medal – third place	2018 Hamilton	Women's singles
Oceania Mixed Team Championships
Gold medal – first place	2014 Ballarat	Mixed team
Gold medal – first place	2016 Auckland	Mixed team
Oceania Women's Team Championships
Gold medal – first place	2018 Hamilton	Women's team

Joy Wai-lok Lai (born 18 August 1998) is an Australian badminton player. She competed at the 2014 Summer Youth Olympics in Nanjing, China. Lai was the champion at the Waikato International tournament in the women's singles event.

== Achievements ==
=== Oceania Championships ===
Women's singles
Year	Venue	Opponent	Score	Result
2018	Eastlink Badminton Stadium, Hamilton, New Zealand	(Australia) Chen Hsuan-yu	Walkover	Bronze
2017	Salle Anewy, Nouméa, New Caledonia	(Australia) Tiffany Ho	17–21, 14–21	Bronze
2016	Punaauia University Hall, Papeete, Tahiti	(Australia) Chen Hsuan-yu	13–21, 15–21	Silver
2015	X-TRM North Harbour Badminton Centre, Auckland, New Zealand	(Australia) Chen Hsuan-yu	18–21, 22–24	Silver
2014	Ken Kay Badminton Hall, Ballarat, Australia	(Australia) Verdet Kessler	12–21, 8–21	Bronze

Women's doubles
Year	Venue	Partner	Opponent	Score	Result
2017	Salle Anewy; Nouméa, New Caledonia	(Australia) Tiffany Ho	(Australia) Setyana Mapasa (Australia) Gronya Somerville	21–16, 18–21, 14–21	Silver

Mixed doubles
Year	Venue	Partner	Opponent	Score	Result
2016	Punaauia University Hall; Papeete, Tahiti	(Australia) Anthony Joe	(Australia) Robin Middleton (Australia) Leanne Choo	11–21, 9–21	Silver

=== BWF International Challenge/Series ===
Women's singles
Year	Tournament	Opponent	Score	Result
2017	Nouméa International	(Australia) Chen Hsuan-yu	16–21, 9–21	(silver) Runner-up
2015	New Caledonia International	(Italy) Jeanine Cicognini	17–21, 15–21	(silver) Runner-up
2015	Waikato International	(Australia) Alice Wu	21–18, 18–21, 21–17	(gold) Winner

Women's doubles
Year	Tournament	Partner	Opponent	Score	Result
2017	Nouméa International	(Australia) Tiffany Ho	(Australia) Setyana Mapasa (Australia) Gronya Somerville	11–21, 8–21	(silver) Runner-up

BWF International Challenge tournament
BWF International Series tournament
BWF Future Series tournament
