= Wallis and Futuna national badminton team =

National badminton team

Wallis and Futuna
- Association: Wallis and Futuna Badminton Association (LBWF)
- Confederation: BO (Oceania)
- President: Caroline Brial

BWF ranking
- Current ranking: Unranked (2 January 2024)
- Highest ranking: Unranked

The Wallis and Futuna national badminton team (French: Équipe nationale de badminton de Wallis-et-Futuna; Wallisian and Futunan: Fo'i gao'i badminton fakafenua no te fenua ʻUvea mo Futuna) represents Wallis and Futuna, an Overseas collectivity of France, in international badminton team competitions. It became an associate member of Badminton Oceania in August 2021. The team made its international debut at the 2022 Pacific Mini Games in Saipan, Northern Mariana Islands, in June 2022.

The Wallisian and Futunan team won third place on their debut in the Pacific Mini Games. The team won the group team matches against Guam, Northern Mariana Islands and Solomon Islands.

== History ==
Badminton made its way to Wallis and Futuna in the 2000s. The Wallis and Futuna Badminton League (French: Ligue de Badminton de Wallis et Futuna) was then formed. In 2021, the national association partnered with Badminton Oceania and the Badminton World Federation and implemented Shuttle Time programs in schools to expose the younger generation to badminton in Wallis and Futuna. The team made their first international appearance at the 2022 Pacific Mini Games in the Northern Mariana Islands.

=== Mixed team ===
Wallis and Futuna sent its first few athletes to compete in the 2003 Pacific Games mixed team event. The team finished in third place after defeating Samoa and Nauru in the round robin tournament. In the 2007 Pacific Games, the Wallis and Futunan team finished in fourth place at the mixed team event after losing to Fiji, Samoa and New Caledonia.

In 2022, the team competed in the 2022 Pacific Mini Games mixed team event. The team first lost 4–1 to New Caledonia but won 3–2 against Guam. The team then lost 5–0 to Tahiti. They bounced back stronger in the final matches as they stunned hosts, the Northern Mariana Islands by winning 3–2 in the group tie. Julien Dauptain delivered the third and winning point for Wallis and Futuna when he was up against Andreau Galvez of the Northern Mariana Islands. The team then won 5–0 against Solomon Islands and claimed a historical bronze medal.

== Competitive record ==
=== Thomas Cup ===
Year	Round	Pos
1949	Not a member of the BWF	
1952	Not a member of the BWF	
1955	Not a member of the BWF	
1958	Not a member of the BWF	
1961	Not a member of the BWF	
1964	Not a member of the BWF	
1967	Not a member of the BWF	
1970	Not a member of the BWF	
1973	Not a member of the BWF	
1976	Not a member of the BWF	
1979	Not a member of the BWF	
1982	Not a member of the BWF	
1984	Not a member of the BWF	
1986	Not a member of the BWF	
1988	Not a member of the BWF	
1990	Not a member of the BWF	
1992	Not a member of the BWF	
1994	Not a member of the BWF	
1996	Not a member of the BWF	
1998	Not a member of the BWF	
2000	Not a member of the BWF	
2002	Not a member of the BWF	
2004	Not a member of the BWF	
2006	Not a member of the BWF	
2008	Not a member of the BWF	
2010	Not a member of the BWF	
2012	Not a member of the BWF	
2014	Not a member of the BWF	
2016	Not a member of the BWF	
2018	Not a member of the BWF	
2020	Not a member of the BWF	
2022	Did not enter	
2024	TBD	
2026	TBD	
2028	TBD	
2030	TBD	

=== Uber Cup ===
Year	Round	Pos
1957	Not a member of the BWF	
1960	Not a member of the BWF	
1963	Not a member of the BWF	
1966	Not a member of the BWF	
1969	Not a member of the BWF	
1972	Not a member of the BWF	
1975	Not a member of the BWF	
1978	Not a member of the BWF	
1981	Not a member of the BWF	
1984	Not a member of the BWF	
1986	Not a member of the BWF	
1988	Not a member of the BWF	
1990	Not a member of the BWF	
1992	Not a member of the BWF	
1994	Not a member of the BWF	
1996	Not a member of the BWF	
1998	Not a member of the BWF	
2000	Not a member of the BWF	
2002	Not a member of the BWF	
2004	Not a member of the BWF	
2006	Not a member of the BWF	
2008	Not a member of the BWF	
2010	Not a member of the BWF	
2012	Not a member of the BWF	
2014	Not a member of the BWF	
2016	Not a member of the BWF	
2018	Not a member of the BWF	
2020	Not a member of the BWF	
2022	Did not enter	
2024	TBD	
2026	TBD	
2028	TBD	
2030	TBD	

=== Sudirman Cup ===
Year	Round	Pos
1989	Not a member of the BWF	
1991	Not a member of the BWF	
1993	Not a member of the BWF	
1995	Not a member of the BWF	
1997	Not a member of the BWF	
1999	Not a member of the BWF	
2001	Not a member of the BWF	
2003	Not a member of the BWF	
2005	Not a member of the BWF	
2007	Not a member of the BWF	
2009	Not a member of the BWF	
2011	Not a member of the BWF	
2013	Not a member of the BWF	
2015	Not a member of the BWF	
2017	Not a member of the BWF	
2019	Not a member of the BWF	
2021	Did not enter	
2023	Did not enter	
2025	TBD	
2027	TBD	
2029	TBD	

=== Oceania Team Championships ===
==== Men's team ====
Year	Round	Pos
2004	Not a member of BO	
2006	Not a member of BO	
2008	Not a member of BO	
2010	Not a member of BO	
2012	Not a member of BO	
2016	Not a member of BO	
2018	Not a member of BO	
2020	Not a member of BO	
2024	Did not enter	
2026	TBD	
2028	TBD	
2030	TBD	

==== Women's team ====
Year	Round	Pos
2004	Not a member of BO	
2006	Not a member of BO	
2008	Not a member of BO	
2010	Not a member of BO	
2012	Not a member of BO	
2016	Not a member of BO	
2018	Not a member of BO	
2020	Not a member of BO	
2024	Did not enter	
2026	TBD	
2028	TBD	
2030	TBD	

==== Mixed team ====
Year	Round	Pos
1999	Not a member of BO	
2002	Not a member of BO	
2004	Not a member of BO	
2006	Not a member of BO	
2008	Not a member of BO	
2010	Not a member of BO	
2012	Not a member of BO	
2014	Not a member of BO	
2016	Not a member of BO	
2019	Not a member of BO	
2023	Did not enter	
2025	TBD	
2027	TBD	
2029	TBD	

=== Pacific Games ===
==== Mixed team ====
Year	Round	Pos
2003	Third place	3rd
2007	Fourth place	4th
2011	Did not enter	
2019	Did not enter	
2027	TBD	

=== Pacific Mini Games ===
==== Mixed team ====
Year	Round	Pos
2022	Third place	3rd

**Red border color indicates tournament was held on home soil.

== Junior competitive record ==
=== Suhandinata Cup ===
Year	Result	Pos
2000	Not a member of the BWF	
2002	Not a member of the BWF	
2004	Not a member of the BWF	
2006	Not a member of the BWF	
2007	Not a member of the BWF	
2008	Not a member of the BWF	
2009	Not a member of the BWF	
2010	Not a member of the BWF	
2011	Not a member of the BWF	
2012	Not a member of the BWF	
2013	Not a member of the BWF	
2014	Not a member of the BWF	
2015	Not a member of the BWF	
2016	Not a member of the BWF	
2017	Not a member of the BWF	
2018	Not a member of the BWF	
2019	Not a member of the BWF	
2022	Did not enter	
2023	Did not enter	
2024	TBD	

=== Oceania Junior Team Championships ===
==== Mixed team ====
Year	Result	Pos
2011	Not a member of BO	
2013	Not a member of BO	
2015	Not a member of BO	
2017	Not a member of BO	
2019	Not a member of BO	
2023	Did not enter	

**Red border color indicates tournament was held on home soil.

== Players ==
=== Current squad ===
As of 2 January 2024

==== Men's team ====
Name	DoB/Age	Ranking of event		
Name	DoB/Age	MS	MD	XD
Julien Dauptain	1979 (age 45–46)	–	–	–
Corentin Likiliki		–	–	–

==== Women's team ====
Name	DoB/Age	Ranking of event		
Name	DoB/Age	WS	WD	XD
Leilana Likuvalu	2007 (age 17–18)	–	–	–
Endrina Nau	1990 (age 34–35)	–	–	–

=== Previous squads ===
==== Pacific Mini Games ====
- Mixed team: 2022
