= Samoa national badminton team =

National badminton team representing Samoa

Samoa
- Association: Samoa Badminton Federation (SBF)
- Confederation: BO (Oceania)
- President: Nynette Sass

BWF ranking
- Current ranking: Unranked (2 January 2024)
- Highest ranking: 117 (2 July 2019)

Oceania Mixed Team Championships
- Appearances: 4 (first in 2019)
- Best result: Fifth place (1999, 2002, 2006)

Oceania Men's Team Championships
- Appearances: 1 (first in 2006)
- Best result: Fourth place (2006)

Oceania Women's Team Championships
- Appearances: 1 (first in 2006)
- Best result: Fourth place (2006)

The Samoa national badminton team (Samoan: Au badminton a Samoa) represents Samoa in international badminton team competitions and is controlled by the Samoa Badminton Association located in Apia. It is associated with Badminton Oceania. The Samoan team once won bronze in the 2007 South Pacific Games mixed team event.

== History ==
Badminton was first played in Samoa in the 1950s when expatriates from the London Missionary Society serving at the Apia Protestant Church started playing the sport. The country began organizing badminton competitions in 1987 to spread the popularity of the sport around the country.

=== Mixed team ===
The Samoan mixed team competed in the mixed team event at the 2003 South Pacific Games. The team lost to New Caledonia, Fiji and Wallis and Futuna but beat Nauru 5−0 to finish in 4th place. In 2007, the team won their first international team medal when the team finished in 3rd place for bronze in the 2007 South Pacific Games mixed team event. In 2019, the team competed in the 2019 Oceania Mixed Team Championships and finished in 7th place. In that same year, the team competed in the 2019 Pacific Games as the home team and finished in 6th place.

== Competitive record ==
=== Thomas Cup ===
Year	Round	Pos
1949	Part of New Zealand	
1952	Part of New Zealand	
1955	Part of New Zealand	
1958	Part of New Zealand	
1961	Part of New Zealand	
1964	Did not enter	
1967	Did not enter	
1970	Did not enter	
1973	Did not enter	
1976	Did not enter	
1979	Did not enter	
1982	Did not enter	
1984	Did not enter	
1986	Did not enter	
1988	Did not enter	
1990	Did not enter	
1992	Did not enter	
1994	Did not enter	
1996	Did not enter	
1998	Did not enter	
2000	Did not enter	
2002	Did not enter	
2004	Did not enter	
2006	Did not qualify	
2008	Did not enter	
2010	Did not enter	
2012	Did not enter	
2014	Did not enter	
2016	Did not enter	
2018	Did not enter	
2020	Did not enter	
2022	Did not enter	
2024	Did not enter	
2026	TBD	
2028	TBD	
2030	TBD	

=== Uber Cup ===
Year	Round	Pos
1957	Part of New Zealand	
1960	Part of New Zealand	
1963	Did not enter	
1966	Did not enter	
1969	Did not enter	
1972	Did not enter	
1975	Did not enter	
1978	Did not enter	
1981	Did not enter	
1984	Did not enter	
1986	Did not enter	
1988	Did not enter	
1990	Did not enter	
1992	Did not enter	
1994	Did not enter	
1996	Did not enter	
1998	Did not enter	
2000	Did not enter	
2002	Did not enter	
2004	Did not enter	
2006	Did not qualify	
2008	Did not enter	
2010	Did not enter	
2012	Did not enter	
2014	Did not enter	
2016	Did not enter	
2018	Did not enter	
2020	Did not enter	
2022	Did not enter	
2024	Did not enter	
2026	TBD	
2028	TBD	
2030	TBD	

=== Sudirman Cup ===
Year	Round	Pos
1989	Did not enter	
1991	Did not enter	
1993	Did not enter	
1995	Did not enter	
1997	Did not enter	
1999	Did not enter	
2001	Did not enter	
2003	Did not enter	
2005	Did not enter	
2007	Did not enter	
2009	Did not enter	
2011	Did not enter	
2013	Did not enter	
2015	Did not enter	
2017	Did not enter	
2019	Did not enter	
2021	Did not enter	
2023	Did not enter	
2025	TBD	
2027	TBD	
2029	TBD	

=== Commonwealth Games ===
==== Men's team ====
Year	Round	Pos
1998	Did not enter	

==== Women's team ====
Year	Round	Pos
1998	Group stage	

==== Mixed team ====
Year	Round	Pos
1978	Did not enter	
1982	Did not enter	
1986	Did not enter	
1990	Did not enter	
1994	Did not enter	
2002	Did not enter	
2006	Did not enter	
2010	Did not enter	
2014	Did not enter	
2018	Did not enter	
2022	Did not enter	
2026	TBD	

=== Oceania Team Championships ===
==== Men's team ====
Year	Round	Pos
2004	Did not enter	
2006	Fourth place	4th
2008	Did not enter	
2010	Did not enter	
2012	Did not enter	
2016	Did not enter	
2018	Did not enter	
2020	Did not enter	
2024	Did not enter	
2026	TBD	
2028	TBD	
2030	TBD	

==== Women's team ====
Year	Round	Pos
2004	Did not enter	
2006	Fourth place	4th
2008	Did not enter	
2010	Did not enter	
2012	Did not enter	
2016	Did not enter	
2018	Did not enter	
2020	Did not enter	
2024	Did not enter	
2026	TBD	
2028	TBD	
2030	TBD	

==== Mixed team ====
Year	Round	Pos
1999	Fifth place	5th
2002	Fifth place	5th
2004	Did not enter	
2006	Fifth place	5th
2008	Did not enter	
2010	Did not enter	
2012	Did not enter	
2014	Did not enter	
2016	Did not enter	
2019	Seventh place	7th
2023	Did not enter	
2025	TBD	
2027	TBD	
2029	TBD	

=== Pacific Games ===
==== Mixed team ====
Year	Round	Pos
2003	Fourth place	4th
2007	Third place	3rd
2011	Did not enter	
2019	Sixth place	6th
2027	TBD	

=== Pacific Mini Games ===
==== Mixed team ====
Year	Round	Pos
2022	Did not enter	

**Red border color indicates tournament was held on home soil.

== Junior competitive record ==
=== Suhandinata Cup ===
Year	Round	Pos
2000	Did not enter	
2002	Did not enter	
2004	Did not enter	
2006	Did not enter	
2007	Did not enter	
2008	Did not enter	
2009	Did not enter	
2010	Did not enter	
2011	Did not enter	
2012	Did not enter	
2013	Did not enter	
2014	Did not enter	
2015	Did not enter	
2016	Did not enter	
2017	Did not enter	
2018	Did not enter	
2019	Did not enter	
2022	Did not enter	
2023	Did not enter	
2024	TBD	

=== Commonwealth Youth Games ===
==== Mixed team ====
Year	Round	Pos
2004	Did not enter	

=== Oceania Junior Team Championships ===
==== Mixed team ====
Year	Round	Pos
2011	Did not enter	
2013	Did not enter	
2015	Did not enter	
2017	Did not enter	
2019	Eighth place	8th
2023	Did not enter	

**Red border color indicates tournament was held on home soil.

== Players ==
=== Current squad ===
As of 2 January 2024

==== Men's team ====
Name	DoB/Age	Ranking of event		
Name	DoB/Age	MS	MD	XD
Charles Iamanu Faalogoifo	22 February 2001 (age 24)	-	-	-
Chris Peti	25 December 2004 (age 20)	-	-	-

==== Women's team ====
Name	DoB/Age	Ranking of event		
Name	DoB/Age	WS	WD	XD
Faafofoga Reti	25 May 2003 (age 21)	-	-	-
Jasmine Reti	18 March 2004 (age 21)	-	-	-

=== Previous squads ===
==== Pacific Games ====
- Mixed team: 2019

==== Oceania Team Championships ====
- Mixed team: 2019
