= Tonga national badminton team =

National badminton team

Tonga
- Association: Tonga National Badminton Association (TNBA)
- Confederation: BO (Oceania)
- President: Amanaki Fakakovikaetau

BWF ranking
- Current ranking: 85 ▼5 (2 January 2024)
- Highest ranking: 80 (4 July 2023)

Oceania Mixed Team Championships
- Appearances: 2 (first in 2016)
- Best result: 5th (2023)

The Tonga national badminton team (Tongan: timi petiminitoni fakafonua ʻa Tonga) represents Tonga in international badminton team competitions. The Tongan team debuted in the Oceania Badminton Championships mixed team event in 2016. The team finished in 5th place. The Tongan junior team debuted in the Oceania Junior Badminton Championships in 2015 and they too finished in 5th place.

== History ==
Badminton was brought to Tonga in 2009. Tonga became the first country in the world to pilot the BWF Shuttle Time programme. The programme was organized to promote badminton in the country. The Badminton Oceania confederation also organized community programs in 2013 to promote the sport.

=== Mixed team ===
Tonga first competed in the 2016 Oceania Mixed Team Championships and finished in 5th place. In 2019, the Tongan mixed team competed in the 2019 Pacific Games. The team defeated the Northern Mariana Islands 4−1 and Kiribati 3−2 and placed just out of the medal position in 4th. In 2023, the team made their second appearance at the Oceania Badminton Championships in 2023. The team finished in 6th place after losing to the Cook Islands.

== Competitive record ==
=== Thomas Cup ===
| Year | Round | Pos |
|---|---|---|
| 1949 | Part of the United Kingdom | |
| 1952 | Part of the United Kingdom | |
| 1955 | Part of the United Kingdom | |
| 1958 | Part of the United Kingdom | |
| 1961 | Part of the United Kingdom | |
| 1964 | Part of the United Kingdom | |
| 1967 | Part of the United Kingdom | |
| 1970 | Part of the United Kingdom | |
| 1973 | Did not enter | |
| 1976 | Did not enter | |
| 1979 | Did not enter | |
| 1982 | Did not enter | |
| 1984 | Did not enter | |
| 1986 | Did not enter | |
| 1988 | Did not enter | |
| 1990 | Did not enter | |
| 1992 | Did not enter | |
| 1994 | Did not enter | |
| 1996 | Did not enter | |
| 1998 | Did not enter | |
| 2000 | Did not enter | |
| 2002 | Did not enter | |
| 2004 | Did not enter | |
| 2006 | Did not enter | |
| 2008 | Did not enter | |
| 2010 | Did not enter | |
| 2012 | Did not enter | |
| 2014 | Did not enter | |
| 2016 | Did not enter | |
| 2018 | Did not enter | |
| 2020 | Did not enter | |
| 2022 | Did not enter | |
| 2024 | Did not enter | |
| 2026 | TBD | |
| 2028 | TBD | |
| 2030 | TBD | |

=== Uber Cup ===
| Year | Round | Pos |
|---|---|---|
| 1957 | Part of the United Kingdom | |
| 1960 | Part of the United Kingdom | |
| 1963 | Part of the United Kingdom | |
| 1966 | Part of the United Kingdom | |
| 1969 | Part of the United Kingdom | |
| 1972 | Did not enter | |
| 1975 | Did not enter | |
| 1978 | Did not enter | |
| 1981 | Did not enter | |
| 1984 | Did not enter | |
| 1986 | Did not enter | |
| 1988 | Did not enter | |
| 1990 | Did not enter | |
| 1992 | Did not enter | |
| 1994 | Did not enter | |
| 1996 | Did not enter | |
| 1998 | Did not enter | |
| 2000 | Did not enter | |
| 2002 | Did not enter | |
| 2004 | Did not enter | |
| 2006 | Did not enter | |
| 2008 | Did not enter | |
| 2010 | Did not enter | |
| 2012 | Did not enter | |
| 2014 | Did not enter | |
| 2016 | Did not enter | |
| 2018 | Did not enter | |
| 2020 | Did not enter | |
| 2022 | Did not enter | |
| 2024 | Did not enter | |
| 2026 | TBD | |
| 2028 | TBD | |
| 2030 | TBD | |

=== Sudirman Cup ===
| Year | Round | Pos |
|---|---|---|
| 1989 | Did not enter | |
| 1991 | Did not enter | |
| 1993 | Did not enter | |
| 1995 | Did not enter | |
| 1997 | Did not enter | |
| 1999 | Did not enter | |
| 2001 | Did not enter | |
| 2003 | Did not enter | |
| 2005 | Did not enter | |
| 2007 | Did not enter | |
| 2009 | Did not enter | |
| 2011 | Did not enter | |
| 2013 | Did not enter | |
| 2015 | Did not enter | |
| 2017 | Did not enter | |
| 2019 | Did not enter | |
| 2021 | Did not enter | |
| 2023 | Did not enter | |
| 2025 | TBD | |
| 2027 | TBD | |
| 2029 | TBD | |

=== Commonwealth Games ===
==== Men's team ====
| Year | Round | Pos |
|---|---|---|
| 1998 | Did not enter | |

==== Women's team ====
| Year | Round | Pos |
|---|---|---|
| 1998 | Did not enter | |

==== Mixed team ====
| Year | Round | Pos |
|---|---|---|
| 1978 | Did not enter | |
| 1982 | Did not enter | |
| 1986 | Did not enter | |
| 1990 | Did not enter | |
| 1994 | Did not enter | |
| 2002 | Did not enter | |
| 2006 | Did not enter | |
| 2010 | Did not enter | |
| 2014 | Did not enter | |
| 2018 | Did not enter | |
| 2022 | Did not enter | |
| 2026 | TBD | |

=== Oceania Team Championships ===
==== Men's team ====
| Year | Round | Pos |
|---|---|---|
| 2004 | Did not enter | |
| 2006 | Did not enter | |
| 2008 | Did not enter | |
| 2010 | Did not enter | |
| 2012 | Did not enter | |
| 2016 | Did not enter | |
| 2018 | Did not enter | |
| 2020 | Did not enter | |
| 2024 | Did not enter | |
| 2026 | TBD | |
| 2028 | TBD | |
| 2030 | TBD | |

==== Women's team ====
| Year | Round | Pos |
|---|---|---|
| 2004 | Did not enter | |
| 2006 | Did not enter | |
| 2008 | Did not enter | |
| 2010 | Did not enter | |
| 2012 | Did not enter | |
| 2016 | Did not enter | |
| 2018 | Did not enter | |
| 2020 | Did not enter | |
| 2024 | Did not enter | |
| 2026 | TBD | |
| 2028 | TBD | |
| 2030 | TBD | |

==== Mixed team ====
| Year | Round | Pos |
|---|---|---|
| 1999 | Did not enter | |
| 2002 | Did not enter | |
| 2004 | Did not enter | |
| 2006 | Did not enter | |
| 2008 | Did not enter | |
| 2010 | Did not enter | |
| 2012 | Did not enter | |
| 2014 | Did not enter | |
| 2016 | Fifth place | 5th |
| 2019 | Did not enter | |
| 2023 | Sixth place | 6th |
| 2025 | TBD | |
| 2027 | TBD | |
| 2029 | TBD | |

=== Pacific Games ===
==== Mixed team ====
| Year | Round | Pos |
|---|---|---|
| 2003 | Did not enter | |
| 2007 | Did not enter | |
| 2011 | Did not enter | |
| 2019 | Fourth place | 4th |
| 2027 | TBD | |

=== Pacific Mini Games ===
==== Mixed team ====
| Year | Round | Pos |
|---|---|---|
| 2022 | Did not enter | |

**Red border color indicates tournament was held on home soil.

== Junior competitive record ==
=== Suhandinata Cup ===
| Year | Round | Pos |
|---|---|---|
| 2000 | Did not enter | |
| 2002 | Did not enter | |
| 2004 | Did not enter | |
| 2006 | Did not enter | |
| 2007 | Did not enter | |
| 2008 | Did not enter | |
| 2009 | Did not enter | |
| 2010 | Did not enter | |
| 2011 | Did not enter | |
| 2012 | Did not enter | |
| 2013 | Did not enter | |
| 2014 | Did not enter | |
| 2015 | Did not enter | |
| 2016 | Did not enter | |
| 2017 | Did not enter | |
| 2018 | Did not enter | |
| 2019 | Did not enter | |
| 2022 | Did not enter | |
| 2023 | Did not enter | |
| 2024 | TBD | |

=== Commonwealth Youth Games ===
==== Mixed team ====
| Year | Round | Pos |
|---|---|---|
| 2004 | Did not enter | |

=== Oceania Junior Team Championships ===
==== Mixed team ====
| Year | Round | Pos |
|---|---|---|
| 2011 | Did not enter | |
| 2013 | Did not enter | |
| 2015 | Fifth place | 5th |
| 2017 | Did not enter | |
| 2019 | Seventh place | 7th |
| 2023 | Did not enter | |

**Red border color indicates tournament was held on home soil.

== Players ==
=== Current squad ===
As of 2 January 2024

==== Men's team ====
| Name | DoB/Age | Ranking of event | | |
| Name | DoB/Age | MS | MD | XD |
|---|---|---|---|---|
| Siale Molitika | 27 June 2002 (age 23) | 1057 | 711 | 740 |
| Taniela Ngaue | 26 August 2005 (age 20) | 1047 | 711 | 740 |
| Siosaia Tei Fonua | 19 September 2004 (age 21) | - | - | - |
| Renaey Na'Aniumotu | 14 January 1998 (age 27) | - | - | - |

==== Women's team ====
| Name | DoB/Age | Ranking of event | | |
| Name | DoB/Age | WS | WD | XD |
|---|---|---|---|---|
| Lata 'Isitolo | 12 July 2004 (age 21) | 577 | 587 | 740 |
| Mele Lingisiva Kei | 5 May 2004 (age 21) | 580 | 587 | 740 |
| Litea Tatafu | 21 January 2000 (age 25) | - | - | - |
| Lesieli Va'Eno | 31 July 2002 (age 23) | - | - | - |

=== Previous squads ===
==== Pacific Games ====
- Mixed team: 2019

==== Oceania Team Championships ====
- Mixed team: 2016, 2023

==== Pacific Mini Games ====
- Mixed team: 2022
