= Solomon Islands national badminton team =

National badminton team representing the Solomon Islands

Solomon Islands
- Association: Solomon Islands National Badminton Federation (SINBF)
- Confederation: BO (Oceania)
- President: Charles Meke

BWF ranking
- Current ranking: Unranked (2 January 2024)
- Highest ranking: Unranked

The Solomon Islands national badminton team represents Solomon Islands in international badminton team competitions and is administered by the Solomon Islands National Badminton Federation, the governing body for badminton in Solomon Islands headquartered in Honiara.

The Solomon Islands made their team competition debut when the team competed in the 2022 Pacific Mini Games. The team finished in 6th place in the round-robin tie.

== History ==
The Solomon Islands National Badminton Federation was founded in 2018. In 2019, the national association became a member of the Badminton Oceania confederation and was the 191st country to become a member the Badminton World Federation. The Solomon Islands first sent their players to compete in individual events at the 2019 Pacific Games.

=== Mixed team ===
The Solomon Islands mixed team competed in the 2022 Pacific Mini Games mixed team event. The team lost 5−0 to all their opponents in the round robin competition and finished in 6th place.

== Competitive record ==
=== Thomas Cup ===
Year	Round	Pos
1949	Part of the United Kingdom	
1952	Part of the United Kingdom	
1955	Part of the United Kingdom	
1958	Part of the United Kingdom	
1961	Part of the United Kingdom	
1964	Part of the United Kingdom	
1967	Part of the United Kingdom	
1970	Part of the United Kingdom	
1973	Part of the United Kingdom	
1976	Part of the United Kingdom	
1979	Not a member of the BWF	
1982	Not a member of the BWF	
1984	Not a member of the BWF	
1986	Not a member of the BWF	
1988	Not a member of the BWF	
1990	Not a member of the BWF	
1992	Not a member of the BWF	
1994	Not a member of the BWF	
1996	Not a member of the BWF	
1998	Not a member of the BWF	
2000	Not a member of the BWF	
2002	Not a member of the BWF	
2004	Not a member of the BWF	
2006	Not a member of the BWF	
2008	Not a member of the BWF	
2010	Not a member of the BWF	
2012	Not a member of the BWF	
2014	Not a member of the BWF	
2016	Not a member of the BWF	
2018	Not a member of the BWF	
2020	Did not enter	
2022	Did not enter	
2024	Did not enter	
2026	TBD	
2028	TBD	
2030	TBD	

=== Uber Cup ===
Year	Round	Pos
1957	Part of the United Kingdom	
1960	Part of the United Kingdom	
1963	Part of the United Kingdom	
1966	Part of the United Kingdom	
1969	Part of the United Kingdom	
1972	Part of the United Kingdom	
1975	Part of the United Kingdom	
1978	Part of the United Kingdom	
1981	Not a member of the BWF	
1984	Not a member of the BWF	
1986	Not a member of the BWF	
1988	Not a member of the BWF	
1990	Not a member of the BWF	
1992	Not a member of the BWF	
1994	Not a member of the BWF	
1996	Not a member of the BWF	
1998	Not a member of the BWF	
2000	Not a member of the BWF	
2002	Not a member of the BWF	
2004	Not a member of the BWF	
2006	Not a member of the BWF	
2008	Not a member of the BWF	
2010	Not a member of the BWF	
2012	Not a member of the BWF	
2014	Not a member of the BWF	
2016	Not a member of the BWF	
2018	Not a member of the BWF	
2020	Did not enter	
2022	Did not enter	
2024	Did not enter	
2026	TBD	
2028	TBD	
2030	TBD	

=== Sudirman Cup ===
Year	Round	Pos
1989	Not a member of the BWF	
1991	Not a member of the BWF	
1993	Not a member of the BWF	
1995	Not a member of the BWF	
1997	Not a member of the BWF	
1999	Not a member of the BWF	
2001	Not a member of the BWF	
2003	Not a member of the BWF	
2005	Not a member of the BWF	
2007	Not a member of the BWF	
2009	Not a member of the BWF	
2011	Not a member of the BWF	
2013	Not a member of the BWF	
2015	Not a member of the BWF	
2017	Not a member of the BWF	
2019	Not a member of the BWF	
2021	Did not enter	
2023	Did not enter	
2025	Did not enter	
2027	TBD	
2029	TBD	

=== Commonwealth Games ===
==== Men's team ====
Year	Round	Pos
1998	Did not enter	

==== Women's team ====
Year	Round	Pos
1998	Did not enter	

==== Mixed team ====
Year	Round	Pos
1978	Did not enter	
1982	Did not enter	
1986	Did not enter	
1990	Did not enter	
1994	Did not enter	
2002	Did not enter	
2006	Did not enter	
2010	Did not enter	
2014	Did not enter	
2018	Did not enter	
2022	Did not enter	
2026	TBD	

=== Oceania Team Championships ===
==== Men's team ====
Year	Round	Pos
2004	Not a member of BO	
2006	Not a member of BO	
2008	Not a member of BO	
2010	Not a member of BO	
2012	Not a member of BO	
2016	Not a member of BO	
2018	Not a member of BO	
2020	Did not enter	
2024	Did not enter	
2026	TBD	
2028	TBD	
2030	TBD	

==== Women's team ====
Year	Round	Pos
2004	Not a member of BO	
2006	Not a member of BO	
2008	Not a member of BO	
2010	Not a member of BO	
2012	Not a member of BO	
2016	Not a member of BO	
2018	Not a member of BO	
2020	Did not enter	
2024	Did not enter	
2026	TBD	
2028	TBD	
2030	TBD	

==== Mixed team ====
Year	Round	Pos
1999	Not a member of BO	
2002	Not a member of BO	
2004	Not a member of BO	
2006	Not a member of BO	
2008	Not a member of BO	
2010	Not a member of BO	
2012	Not a member of BO	
2014	Not a member of BO	
2016	Not a member of BO	
2019	Did not enter	
2023	Did not enter	
2025	Did not enter	
2027	TBD	
2029	TBD	

=== Pacific Games ===
==== Mixed team ====
Year	Round	Pos
2003	Did not enter	
2007	Did not enter	
2011	Did not enter	
2019	Did not enter	
2027	TBD	

=== Pacific Mini Games ===
==== Mixed team ====
Year	Round	Pos
2022	Sixth place	6th

**Red border color indicates tournament was held on home soil.

== Junior competitive record ==
=== Suhandinata Cup ===
Year	Round	Pos
2000	Not a member of the BWF	
2002	Not a member of the BWF	
2004	Not a member of the BWF	
2006	Not a member of the BWF	
2007	Not a member of the BWF	
2008	Not a member of the BWF	
2009	Not a member of the BWF	
2010	Not a member of the BWF	
2011	Not a member of the BWF	
2012	Not a member of the BWF	
2013	Not a member of the BWF	
2014	Not a member of the BWF	
2015	Not a member of the BWF	
2016	Not a member of the BWF	
2017	Not a member of the BWF	
2018	Not a member of the BWF	
2019	Not a member of the BWF	
2022	Did not enter	
2023	Did not enter	
2024	TBD	

=== Commonwealth Youth Games ===
==== Mixed team ====
Year	Round	Pos
2004	Did not enter	

=== Oceania Junior Team Championships ===
==== Mixed team ====
Year	Round	Pos
2011	Not a member of BO	
2013	Not a member of BO	
2015	Not a member of BO	
2017	Not a member of BO	
2019	Did not enter	
2023	Did not enter	

**Red border color indicates tournament was held on home soil.

== Players ==
=== Current squad ===
As of 2 January 2024

==== Men's team ====
Name	DoB/Age	Ranking of event		
Name	DoB/Age	MS	MD	XD
Joseph Taupiri	2004 (age 21–22)	-	-	-
Joseph Matiota	2004 (age 21–22)	-	-	-
Jeffery Kalia	2004 (age 21–22)	-	-	-
Rodney Vaka	2004 (age 21–22)	-	-	-

==== Women's team ====
Name	DoB/Age	Ranking of event		
Name	DoB/Age	WS	WD	XD
Elizabeth Meke	2000 (age 25–26)	-	-	-
Norah Meke	2000 (age 25–26)	-	-	-
Emma Soaki	2000 (age 25–26)	-	-	-
Catherine Temete	2000 (age 25–26)	-	-	-

=== Previous squads ===
==== Pacific Mini Games ====
- Mixed team: 2022
