= Papua New Guinea national badminton team =

Papua New Guinea
- Association: Badminton Papua New Guinea
- Confederation: Badminton Oceania
- President: Kinivanagi Karo

BWF ranking
- Current ranking: Unranked
- Highest ranking: Unranked

The Papua New Guinea national badminton team (Tok Pisin: Nesenel badminton tim bilong Papua Niugini) represents Papua New Guinea in international badminton team competitions. It is organized by Badminton Papua New Guinea, the governing body for badminton in Papua New Guinea. Badminton is not a popular sport in Papua New Guinea, The national team have rarely participated in international team events.

While the sport is not popular in the nation, it has been gaining slight popularity with the help of Shuttle Time programs organized by the Badminton World Federation to support the teaching of enjoyable, safe and inclusive badminton activities to children.

Papua New Guinea also competes in para-badminton. The para-badminton team competed in the 2020 Oceania Para-Badminton Championships and won a silver and a bronze medal.

== Participation in Oceania Para-Badminton Championships ==
Papua New Guinea debuted in the 2020 Oceania Para-Badminton Championships. David Joe Kaniku won Papua New Guinea's first medal at the championships.

As of the 2022 Oceania Para Badminton Championships

Rank	Nation	Gold	Silver	Bronze	Total
1	Australia	18	20	38	76
2	New Zealand	6	3	8	17
3	Papua New Guinea	0	1	2	3
4	Fiji	0	0	1	1
Totals (4 entries)		24	24	49	97

=== List of medalists ===
Medal	Name	Venue	Event
Silver	David Joe Kaniku	(Australia) 2020 Ballarat	Men's singles SH6
Bronze	Jerome Bunge	(Australia) 2020 Ballarat	Men's doubles SL3-SU5
Bronze	Danny Ten	(Australia) 2020 Ballarat	Mixed doubles SL3-SU5
Bronze	Jerome Bunge	(Australia) 2022 Melbourne	Men's singles SL3+SU5

== Current squad ==
=== Para-badminton ===
Men

- Jerome Bunge
- David Joe Kaniku
- Danny Ten

Women

- Dorna Longbut
- Nelly Ruth Leva
