= Nauru national badminton team =

Nauru
- Association: Nauru Badminton Association (NBA)
- Confederation: BO (Oceania)
- President: Marissa Cook

BWF ranking
- Current ranking: Unranked (2 January 2024)
- Highest ranking: 98 (3 April 2014)

Oceania Mixed Team Championships
- Appearances: 1 (first in 2014)
- Best result: Group stage

The Nauru national badminton team (Nauruan: Karone ekaramwen badminton eben Ripubrikin Naoero) represents Nauru in international badminton team competitions. It is administered by the Nauru Badminton Association, the governing body for badminton in Nauru. The Nauruan team first competed in the 2014 Oceania Badminton Championships mixed team event.

== History ==
Badminton was first played in Nauru in the early 1990s. The Nauru Badminton Association was formed in 1992. The national association sent their first few players to compete in the 2003 South Pacific Games.

=== Mixed team ===
Nauru made their international team debut when the mixed team competed in the 2003 South Pacific Games mixed team event. The team finished in 5th place. In 2014, the team made their Oceania Mixed Team Championships debut. The team were eliminated in the group stages.

== Competitive record ==
=== Thomas Cup ===
Year	Result
(England) 1949	Part of the United Kingdom
(Colony of Singapore) 1952	Part of the United Kingdom
(Colony of Singapore) 1955	Part of the United Kingdom
(Colony of Singapore) 1958	Part of the United Kingdom
(Indonesia) 1961	Part of the United Kingdom
(Japan) 1964	Part of the United Kingdom
(Indonesia) 1967	Part of the United Kingdom
(Malaysia) 1970	Not a member of the BWF
(Indonesia) 1973	Not a member of the BWF
(Thailand) 1976	Not a member of the BWF
(Indonesia) 1979	Not a member of the BWF
(England) 1982	Not a member of the BWF
(Malaysia) 1984	Not a member of the BWF
(Indonesia) 1986	Not a member of the BWF
(Malaysia) 1988	Not a member of the BWF
(Japan) 1990	Not a member of the BWF
(Malaysia) 1992	Not a member of the BWF
(Indonesia) 1994	Did not enter
(Hong Kong) 1996	Did not enter
(Hong Kong) 1998	Did not enter
(Malaysia) 2000	Did not enter
(China) 2002	Did not enter
(Indonesia) 2004	Did not enter
(Japan) 2006	Did not enter
(Indonesia) 2008	Did not enter
(Malaysia) 2010	Did not enter
(China) 2012	Did not enter
(India) 2014	Did not enter
(China) 2016	Did not enter
(Thailand) 2018	Did not enter
(Denmark) 2020	Did not enter
(Thailand) 2022	Did not enter
(China) 2024	TBD
(N/A) 2026	TBD
(N/A) 2028	TBD
(N/A) 2030	TBD

=== Uber Cup ===
Year	Result
(England) 1957	Part of the United Kingdom
(United States) 1960	Part of the United Kingdom
(United States) 1963	Part of the United Kingdom
(New Zealand) 1966	Part of the United Kingdom
(Japan) 1969	Not a member of the BWF
(Japan) 1972	Not a member of the BWF
(Indonesia) 1975	Not a member of the BWF
(New Zealand) 1978	Not a member of the BWF
(Japan) 1981	Not a member of the BWF
(Malaysia) 1984	Not a member of the BWF
(Indonesia) 1986	Not a member of the BWF
(Malaysia) 1988	Not a member of the BWF
(Japan) 1990	Not a member of the BWF
(Malaysia) 1992	Not a member of the BWF
(Indonesia) 1994	Did not enter
(Hong Kong) 1996	Did not enter
(Hong Kong) 1998	Did not enter
(Malaysia) 2000	Did not enter
(China) 2002	Did not enter
(Indonesia) 2004	Did not enter
(Japan) 2006	Did not enter
(Indonesia) 2008	Did not enter
(Malaysia) 2010	Did not enter
(China) 2012	Did not enter
(India) 2014	Did not enter
(China) 2016	Did not enter
(Thailand) 2018	Did not enter
(Denmark) 2020	Did not enter
(Thailand) 2022	Did not enter
(China) 2024	TBD
(N/A) 2026	TBD
(N/A) 2028	TBD
(N/A) 2030	TBD

=== Sudirman Cup ===
Year	Result
(Indonesia) 1989	Not a member of the BWF
(Denmark) 1991	Not a member of the BWF
(England) 1993	Did not enter
(Switzerland) 1995	Did not enter
(Scotland) 1997	Did not enter
(Denmark) 1999	Did not enter
(Spain) 2001	Did not enter
(Netherlands) 2003	Did not enter
(China) 2005	Did not enter
(Scotland) 2007	Did not enter
(China) 2009	Did not enter
(China) 2011	Did not enter
(Malaysia) 2013	Did not enter
(China) 2015	Did not enter
(Australia) 2017	Did not enter
(China) 2019	Did not enter
(Finland) 2021	Did not enter
(China) 2023	Did not enter
(China) 2025	TBD
(N/A) 2027	TBD
(N/A) 2029	TBD

=== Commonwealth Games ===
==== Men's team ====
Year	Result
(Malaysia) 1998	Did not enter

==== Women's team ====
Year	Result
(Malaysia) 1998	Did not enter

==== Mixed team ====
Year	Result
(Canada) 1978	Did not enter
(Australia) 1982	Did not enter
(Scotland) 1986	Did not enter
(New Zealand) 1990	Did not enter
(Canada) 1994	Did not enter
(England) 2002	Did not enter
(Australia) 2006	Did not enter
(India) 2010	Did not enter
(Scotland) 2014	Did not enter
(Australia) 2018	Did not enter
(England) 2022	Did not enter
(Australia) 2026	TBD

=== Oceania Team Championships ===
==== Men's team ====
Year	Result
(Australia) 2004	Did not enter
(New Zealand) 2006	Did not enter
(New Caledonia) 2008	Did not enter
(New Zealand) 2010	Did not enter
(Australia) 2012	Did not enter
(New Zealand) 2016	Did not enter
(New Zealand) 2018	Did not enter
(Australia) 2020	Did not enter
(Australia) 2024	TBD

==== Women's team ====
Year	Result
(Australia) 2004	Did not enter
(New Zealand) 2006	Did not enter
(New Caledonia) 2008	Did not enter
(New Zealand) 2010	Did not enter
(Australia) 2012	Did not enter
(New Zealand) 2016	Did not enter
(New Zealand) 2018	Did not enter
(Australia) 2020	Did not enter
(Australia) 2024	TBD

==== Mixed team ====
Year	Result
(Australia) 1999	Did not enter
(Fiji) 2002	Did not enter
(New Zealand) 2004	Did not enter
(New Zealand) 2006	Did not enter
(New Caledonia) 2008	Did not enter
(New Zealand) 2010	Did not enter
(Australia) 2012	Did not enter
(Australia) 2014	Group stage
(New Zealand) 2016	Did not enter
(Australia) 2019	Did not enter
(New Zealand) 2023	Did not enter

=== Pacific Games ===
==== Mixed team ====
Year	Result
(Fiji) 2003	Round robin – 5th
(Samoa) 2007	Did not enter
(New Caledonia) 2011	Did not enter
(Samoa) 2019	Did not enter
(French Polynesia) 2027	TBD

=== Pacific Mini Games ===
==== Mixed team ====
Year	Result
(Northern Mariana Islands) 2022	Did not enter

**Red border color indicates tournament was held on home soil.

== Junior competitive record ==
=== Suhandinata Cup ===
Year	Result
(China) 2000	Did not enter
(South Africa) 2002	Did not enter
(Canada) 2004	Did not enter
(South Korea) 2006	Did not enter
(New Zealand) 2007	Did not enter
(India) 2008	Did not enter
(Malaysia) 2009	Did not enter
(Mexico) 2010	Did not enter
(Chinese Taipei) 2011	Did not enter
(Japan) 2012	Did not enter
(Thailand) 2013	Did not enter
(Malaysia) 2014	Did not enter
(Peru) 2015	Did not enter
(Spain) 2016	Did not enter
(Indonesia) 2017	Did not enter
(Canada) 2018	Did not enter
(Russia) 2019	Did not enter
(Spain) 2022	Did not enter
(United States) 2023	Did not enter
(N/A) 2024	TBD

=== Oceania Junior Team Championships ===
==== Mixed team ====
Year	Result
(Fiji) 2011	Did not enter
(French Polynesia) 2013	Did not enter
(New Zealand) 2015	Did not enter
(New Caledonia) 2017	Did not enter
(Australia) 2019	Did not enter
(New Zealand) 2023	Did not enter

**Red border color indicates tournament was held on home soil.

== Players ==
=== Current squad ===
As of 2 January 2024

==== Men's team ====
Name	DoB/Age	Ranking of event		
Name	DoB/Age	MS	MD	XD
Image Declan Capelle	21 September 1999 (age 25)	–	–	–
Ronson-Dedemaro Cook	5 June 1999 (age 26)	–	–	–

==== Women's team ====
Name	DoB/Age	Ranking of event		
Name	DoB/Age	WS	WD	XD
Ruth Bagaga	1 July 2000 (age 25)	–	–	–
Zoshka Detenamo	8 September 1998 (age 26)	–	–	–

=== Previous squads ===
==== Oceania Team Championships ====
- Mixed team: 2014
