= New Caledonia national badminton team =

National badminton team representing New Caledonia

New Caledonia
- Association: New Caledonia Badminton Association (NCBA)
- Confederation: BO (Oceania)
- President: Johanna Kou

BWF ranking
- Current ranking: 67 ▲1 (2 January 2024)
- Highest ranking: 34 (4 January 2018)

Sudirman Cup
- Appearances: 1 (first in 2017)
- Best result: Group stage

Oceania Mixed Team Championships
- Appearances: 7 (first in 1999)
- Best result: Third place (1999, 2008, 2014, 2019, 2023)

Oceania Men's Team Championships
- Appearances: 4 (first in 2010)
- Best result: Third place (2010, 2012)

Oceania Women's Team Championships
- Appearances: 4 (first in 2010)
- Best result: Third place (2010, 2012, 2016, 2020)

The New Caledonia national badminton team (French: Équipe nationale de badminton de Nouvelle-Calédonie) represents New Caledonia, an overseas collectivity of France, in international badminton team competitions. New Caledonia has competed in the Sudirman Cup once, which was in 2017, where the team was placed in Group 3A.

New Caledonia has reached many semifinals at the Oceania Badminton Championships. The men's team finished in third place in 2010 and 2012. The women's team have won bronze since 2010. The mixed team won bronze in 1999, 2008, 2014 and 2019. The New Caledonian team also competes in the Pacific Mini Games. They were runners-up at the 2022 Pacific Mini Games.

== Competitive record ==
=== Thomas Cup ===
Year	Result
(England) 1949	Not a member of the BWF
(Colony of Singapore) 1952	Not a member of the BWF
(Colony of Singapore) 1955	Not a member of the BWF
(Colony of Singapore) 1958	Not a member of the BWF
(Indonesia) 1961	Not a member of the BWF
(Japan) 1964	Not a member of the BWF
(Indonesia) 1967	Not a member of the BWF
(Malaysia) 1970	Not a member of the BWF
(Indonesia) 1973	Not a member of the BWF
(Thailand) 1976	Not a member of the BWF
(Indonesia) 1979	Not a member of the BWF
(England) 1982	Not a member of the BWF
(Malaysia) 1984	Not a member of the BWF
(Indonesia) 1986	Not a member of the BWF
(Malaysia) 1988	Not a member of the BWF
(Japan) 1990	Not a member of the BWF
(Malaysia) 1992	Not a member of the BWF
(Indonesia) 1994	Not a member of the BWF
(Hong Kong) 1996	Not a member of the BWF
(Hong Kong) 1998	Not a member of the BWF
(Malaysia) 2000	Did not enter
(China) 2002	Did not enter
(Indonesia) 2004	Did not enter
(Japan) 2006	Did not enter
(Indonesia) 2008	Did not enter
(Malaysia) 2010	Did not qualify
(China) 2012	Did not qualify
(India) 2014	Did not enter
(China) 2016	Did not qualify
(Thailand) 2018	Did not enter
(Denmark) 2020	Did not qualify
(Thailand) 2022	Did not enter
(China) 2024	Did not enter
(Denmark) 2026	Did not qualify
(N/A) 2028	TBD
(N/A) 2030	TBD

=== Uber Cup ===
Year	Result
(England) 1957	Not a member of the BWF
(United States) 1960	Not a member of the BWF
(United States) 1963	Not a member of the BWF
(New Zealand) 1966	Not a member of the BWF
(Japan) 1969	Not a member of the BWF
(Japan) 1972	Not a member of the BWF
(Indonesia) 1975	Not a member of the BWF
(New Zealand) 1978	Not a member of the BWF
(Japan) 1981	Not a member of the BWF
(Malaysia) 1984	Not a member of the BWF
(Indonesia) 1986	Not a member of the BWF
(Malaysia) 1988	Not a member of the BWF
(Japan) 1990	Not a member of the BWF
(Malaysia) 1992	Not a member of the BWF
(Indonesia) 1994	Not a member of the BWF
(Hong Kong) 1996	Not a member of the BWF
(Hong Kong) 1998	Not a member of the BWF
(Malaysia) 2000	Did not enter
(China) 2002	Did not enter
(Indonesia) 2004	Did not enter
(Japan) 2006	Did not enter
(Indonesia) 2008	Did not enter
(Malaysia) 2010	Did not qualify
(China) 2012	Did not qualify
(India) 2014	Did not enter
(China) 2016	Did not qualify
(Thailand) 2018	Did not enter
(Denmark) 2020	Did not qualify
(Thailand) 2022	Did not enter
(China) 2024	Did not enter
(Denmark) 2026	Did not qualify
(N/A) 2028	TBD
(N/A) 2030	TBD

=== Sudirman Cup ===
Year	Result
(Indonesia) 1989	Not a member of the BWF
(Denmark) 1991	Not a member of the BWF
(England) 1993	Not a member of the BWF
(Switzerland) 1995	Not a member of the BWF
(Scotland) 1997	Not a member of the BWF
(Denmark) 1999	Not a member of the BWF
(Spain) 2001	Not a member of the BWF
(Netherlands) 2003	Not a member of the BWF
(China) 2005	Not a member of the BWF
(Scotland) 2007	Not a member of the BWF
(China) 2009	Not a member of the BWF
(China) 2011	Not a member of the BWF
(Malaysia) 2013	Did not enter
(China) 2015	Did not enter
(Australia) 2017	Group 3 − 24th
(China) 2019	Did not enter
(Finland) 2021	Did not enter
(China) 2023	Did not qualify
(China) 2025	TBD
(N/A) 2027	TBD
(N/A) 2029	TBD

=== Oceania Team Championships ===
==== Men's team ====
Year	Result
(Australia) 2004	Did not enter
(New Zealand) 2006	Did not enter
(New Caledonia) 2008	Did not enter
(New Zealand) 2010	(bronze) Third place
(Australia) 2012	(bronze) Third place
(New Zealand) 2016	Fourth place
(New Zealand) 2018	Did not enter
(Australia) 2020	Fourth place
(Australia) 2024	Did not enter
(New Zealand) 2026	Fourth place

==== Women's team ====
Year	Result
(Australia) 2004	Did not enter
(New Zealand) 2006	Did not enter
(New Caledonia) 2008	Did not enter
(New Zealand) 2010	(bronze) Third place
(Australia) 2012	(bronze) Third place
(New Zealand) 2016	(bronze) Third place
(New Zealand) 2018	Did not enter
(Australia) 2020	(bronze) Third place
(Australia) 2024	Did not enter
(New Zealand) 2026	Sixth place

==== Mixed team ====
Year	Result
(Australia) 1999	(bronze) Third place
(Fiji) 2002	Did not enter
(New Zealand) 2004	Did not enter
(New Zealand) 2006	Did not enter
(New Caledonia) 2008	(bronze) Third place
(New Zealand) 2010	Did not enter
(Australia) 2012	Fourth place
(Australia) 2014	(bronze) Third place
(New Zealand) 2016	Fourth place
(Australia) 2019	(bronze) Third place
(New Zealand) 2023	(bronze) Third place

=== Pacific Games ===
==== Mixed team ====
Year	Result
(Fiji) 2003	(silver) Runners-up
(Samoa) 2007	(gold) Champions
(New Caledonia) 2011	(gold) Champions
(Samoa) 2019	(silver) Runners-up
(French Polynesia) 2027	TBD

=== Pacific Mini Games ===
==== Mixed team ====
Year	Result
(Northern Mariana Islands) 2022	(silver) Runners-up

**Red border color indicates tournament was held on home soil.

== Junior competitive record ==
=== Suhandinata Cup ===
Year	Result
(China) 2000	Did not enter
(South Africa) 2002	Did not enter
(Canada) 2004	Did not enter
(South Korea) 2006	Did not enter
(New Zealand) 2007	Did not enter
(India) 2008	Did not enter
(Malaysia) 2009	Did not enter
(Mexico) 2010	Did not enter
(Chinese Taipei) 2011	Did not enter
(Japan) 2012	Did not enter
(Thailand) 2013	Did not enter
(Malaysia) 2014	Did not enter
(Peru) 2015	Did not enter
(Spain) 2016	Did not enter
(Indonesia) 2017	Did not enter
(Canada) 2018	Did not enter
(Russia) 2019	Did not enter
(Spain) 2022	Did not enter
(United States) 2023	Did not enter
(N/A) 2024	TBD

=== Oceania Junior Team Championships ===
==== Mixed team ====
Year	Result
(Fiji) 2011	Did not enter
(French Polynesia) 2013	Did not enter
(New Zealand) 2015	Did not enter
(New Caledonia) 2017	Fourth place
(Australia) 2019	Fourth place
(New Zealand) 2023	(bronze) Third place

**Red border color indicates tournament was held on home soil.

== Players ==
=== Current squad ===
As of 2 January 2024

==== Men's team ====
Name	DoB/Age	Ranking of event		
Name	DoB/Age	MS	MD	XD
Jeremy Lemaitre	21 September 1994 (age 31)	1047	-	737
Yohan de Geoffroy	29 November 1998 (age 27)	-	-	-
Ronan Ho-Yagues	17 July 2000 (age 25)	-	-	-
Lucas Juillot	13 January 2005 (age 21)	1828	-	408

==== Women's team ====
Name	DoB/Age	Ranking of event		
Name	DoB/Age	WS	WD	XD
Soizick Ho-Yagues	24 November 1997 (age 28)	586	587	408
Dgenyva Matauli	2 December 2001 (age 24)	463	587	-
Marine Souviat	16 May 2006 (age 19)	1243	-	-
Julie Wongsodjirono	12 May 2006 (age 19)	-	-	-
