= Australia national badminton team =

National badminton team representing Australia

Australia
- Nickname(s): The Falcons
- Association: Badminton Australia (BA)
- Confederation: BO (Oceania)
- President: Andrew Greenway

BWF ranking
- Current ranking: 18 ▲1 (2 January 2024)
- Highest ranking: 16 (5 October 2017)

Sudirman Cup
- Appearances: 16 (first in 1989)
- Best result: Group stage

Thomas Cup
- Appearances: 6 (first in 1955)
- Best result: Group stage

Uber Cup
- Appearances: 11 (first in 1975)
- Best result: Group stage

Oceania Mixed Team Championships
- Appearances: 12 (first in 1999)
- Best result: Champions (1999, 2002, 2010, 2012, 2014, 2016, 2019, 2023, 2025)

Oceania Men's Team Championships
- Appearances: 6 (first in 2008)
- Best result: Champions (2010, 2018, 2020)

Oceania Women's Team Championships
- Appearances: 6 (first in 2008)
- Best result: Champions (2010, 2012, 2016, 2018, 2020)

The Australia national badminton team, also known as The Falcons, represents Australia in international badminton team competitions. The team is controlled by Badminton Australia, the leading authority for badminton in the country. The team's history dates back to 1900, with the establishment of Badminton Australia in 1932 leading to the formation of the national team. The Falcons made their international debut in the 1955 Thomas Cup.

The team has had some success in regional competitions, particularly the Oceania Mixed Team Championships, where they have been crowned champions multiple times. Despite their regional success, the team has yet to reach the semi-finals in global competitions such as the Thomas Cup, Uber Cup, and the Sudirman Cup. The team's highest global ranking to date is 16th, achieved on 5 October 2017. As of 2 January 2024, the team is ranked 18th in the world.

== History ==
Australia's badminton history first began in 1900, when the sport was played and was considered a popular pastime for church groups which played the game in church halls. In 1932, Badminton Australia was established which led to the formation of the national team. Nicknamed the Falcons, the Australian team made their international team debut when the men's team competed in the 1955 Thomas Cup.

=== Men's team ===
Australia qualified for their first Thomas Cup in 1955 after defeating New Zealand 7–2 in the Australasian zone qualifiers. The team then lost 9–0 to Denmark in the inter-zone playoffs. In the 1961 Thomas Cup, the Australian team failed to advance further after losing the first round to Thailand.

After 49 years, Australia qualified for the Thomas Cup once again in 2010 after being crowned champions at the 2010 Oceania Men's Team Championships. The team were eliminated in the group stages after losing to Indonesia and India in Group D. The team failed to qualify for the next two editions of the championships but returned to the 2018 Thomas Cup. The team lost all their matches in Group A against China, France and India.

In 2020, the team qualified for the 2020 Thomas Cup but withdrew from the competition due to travel costs and quarantine restrictions in the country. The team were then replaced by Tahiti.

=== Women's team ===
The Australian women's team made their Uber Cup debut in 1975 after defeating New Zealand. The team missed their chances of entering the second round after losing narrowly to Canada.

The Australian women's team won every Oceania Women's Team Championships and qualified for the Uber Cup consecutively in the 2010s. In 2020, the women's team withdrew from the 2020 Thomas & Uber Cup along with the men's team.

=== Mixed team ===
The Australian mixed team first competed in the 1982 Commonwealth Games. The team won third place after winning against New Zealand in the bronze-medal tie. The team won third place for a second time in 1986 after a close battle against Scotland. In 1989, the team competed in the inaugural edition of the Sudirman Cup. The team lost 4–1 to Scotland but managed to win 3–2 against Germany and Poland to claim 16th place in the final standings. The team won the first two Oceania Mixed Team Championships in 1999 and 2002. The team won every mixed team title in the 2010s.

The mixed team continued their win streak by winning the Oceania Mixed Team Championships for the sixth time in 2023. This qualified them for the 2023 Sudirman Cup in Suzhou.

== Competitive record ==
=== Thomas Cup ===
Year	Round	Pos
1949	Did not enter	
1952	Did not qualify	
1955	First round inter-zone	5th
1958	Did not qualify	
1961	First round inter-zone	5th
1964	Did not qualify	
1967	Did not qualify	
1970	Did not qualify	
1973	Did not qualify	
1976	Did not qualify	
1979	Did not qualify	
1982	Did not qualify	
1984	Did not qualify	
1986	Did not qualify	
1988	Did not qualify	
1990	Did not qualify	
1992	Did not qualify	
1994	Did not qualify	
1996	Did not qualify	
1998	Did not qualify	
2000	Did not qualify	
2002	Did not qualify	
2004	Did not qualify	
2006	Did not qualify	
2008	Did not qualify	
2010	Group stage	9th
2012	Did not qualify	
2014	Did not qualify	
2016	Did not qualify	
2018	Group stage	13th
2020	Withdrew	
2022	Did not qualify	
2024	Group stage	14th
2026	Group stage	15th
2028	TBD	
2030	TBD	

=== Uber Cup ===
Year	Round	Pos
1957	Did not enter	
1960	Did not qualify	
1963	Did not qualify	
1966	Did not qualify	
1969	Did not qualify	
1972	Did not qualify	
1975	First round inter-zone	5th
1978	First round inter-zone	6th
1981	Did not qualify	
1984	Did not qualify	
1986	Did not qualify	
1988	Did not qualify	
1990	Did not qualify	
1992	Did not qualify	
1994	Did not qualify	
1996	Did not qualify	
1998	Did not qualify	
2000	Did not qualify	
2002	Did not qualify	
2004	Group stage	10th
2006	Did not qualify	
2008	Did not qualify	
2010	Group stage	10th
2012	Group stage	10th
2014	Group stage	16th
2016	Group stage	15th
2018	Group stage	13th
2020	Withdrew	
2022	Group stage	15th
2024	Group stage	13th
2026	Group stage	15th
2028	TBD	
2030	TBD	

=== Sudirman Cup ===
Year	Round	Pos
1989	Group stage	16th
1991	Group stage	15th
1993	Group stage	14th
1995	Group stage	15th
1997	Group stage	16th
1999	Group stage	19th
2001	Did not enter	
2003	Group stage	26th
2005	Group stage	27th
2007	Group stage	26th
2009	Group stage	24th
2011	Group stage	22nd
2013	Group stage	24th
2015	Group stage	23rd
2017	Group stage	15th
2019	Group stage	24th
2021	Withdrew	
2023	Group stage	15th
2025	Group stage	14th
2027	TBD	
2029	TBD	

=== Commonwealth Games ===
==== Men's team ====
Year	Round	Pos
1998	Quarter-finals	

==== Women's team ====
Year	Round	Pos
1998	Third place	3rd

==== Mixed team ====
Year	Round	Pos
1978	Group stage	
1982	Third place	3rd
1986	Third place	3rd
1990	Quarter-finals	
1994	Semi-finals	3rd
2002	Quarter-finals	
2006	Quarter-finals	
2010	Quarter-finals	
2014	Quarter-finals	
2018	Quarter-finals	
2022	Group stage	
2026	TBD	

=== Oceania Team Championships ===
==== Men's team ====
Year	Round	Pos
2004	Runners-up	2nd
2006	Runners-up	2nd
2008	Runners-up	2nd
2010	Champions	1st
2012	Runners-up	2nd
2016	Runners-up	2nd
2018	Champions	1st
2020	Champions	1st
2024	Champions	1st
2026	Champions	1st

==== Women's team ====
Year	Round	Pos
2004	Champions	1st
2006	Runners-up	2nd
2008	Runners-up	2nd
2010	Champions	1st
2012	Champions	1st
2016	Champions	1st
2018	Champions	1st
2020	Champions	1st
2024	Champions	1st
2026	Champions	1st

==== Mixed team ====
Year	Round	Pos
1999	Champions	1st
2002	Champions	1st
2004	Runners-up	2nd
2006	Runners-up	2nd
2008	Runners-up	2nd
2010	Champions	1st
2012	Champions	1st
2014	Champions	1st
2016	Champions	1st
2019	Champions	1st
2023	Champions	1st
2025	Champions	1st

=== FISU World University Games ===
==== Mixed team ====
Year	Round	Pos
2007	Did not enter	
2011	Did not enter	
2013	Group stage	
2015	Group stage	
2017	Group stage	11th
2021	Did not enter	
2025	TBD	

=== World University Team Championships ===
==== Mixed team ====
Year	Round	Pos
2008	Did not enter	
2010	Did not enter	
2012	Did not enter	
2014	Group stage	12th
2016	Did not enter	
2018	Group stage	10th

**Red border color indicates tournament was held on home soil.

== Junior competitive record ==
=== Suhandinata Cup ===
Year	Round	Pos
2000	Group stage	12th
2002	Group stage	22nd
2004	Did not enter	
2006	Group stage	24th
2007	Group stage	19th
2008	Did not enter	
2009	Group stage	21st
2010	Did not enter	
2011	Group stage	18th
2012	Group stage	19th
2013	Group stage	19th
2014	Group stage	23rd
2015	Group stage	22nd
2016	Group stage	26th
2017	Group stage	35th
2018	Group stage	35th
2019	Group stage	35th
2020	Cancelled because of COVID-19 pandemic	
2021	Cancelled because of COVID-19 pandemic	
2022	Group stage	19th
2023	Group stage	25th
2024	Group stage	26th
2025	Group stage	20th of 36
2026	Group stage	23rd of 47

=== Commonwealth Youth Games ===
==== Mixed team ====
Year	Round	Pos
2004	Group stage	7th

=== Oceania Junior Team Championships ===
==== Mixed team ====
Year	Round	Pos
2011	Runners-up	2nd
2013	Champions	1st
2015	Champions	1st
2017	Runners-up	2nd
2019	Champions	1st
2023	Champions	1st
2025	Champions	1st

**Red border color indicates tournament was held on home soil.

== Staff ==
The following list shows the coaching staff for the Australian national badminton team.

Name	Role
(Australia) Leanne Choo	Head coach
(Malaysia) Vountus Indra Mawan	Assistant coach

== Players ==
=== Current squad ===
As of 2 January 2024

==== Men's team ====
Name	DoB/Age	Ranking of event		
Name	DoB/Age	MS	MD	XD
Jack Yu	13 September 2004 (age 22)	204	154	183
Keith Mark Edison	31 May 1999 (age 27)	291	154	952
Ricky Tang	6 April 2004 (age 22)	181	266	346
Huaidong Tang	21 March 1998 (age 28)	–	266	243
Jacob Schueler	17 February 1998 (age 28)	174	363	281
Nathan Tang	26 August 1990 (age 36)	155	363	–
Gavin Kyjac Ong	25 November 1999 (age 26)	709	403	346
Teoh Kai Chen	1 November 2000 (age 25)	267	403	144
Rayne Wang	17 January 2003 (age 23)	–	182	130
Kenneth Choo	1 April 1997 (age 29)	–	182	44

==== Women's team ====
Name	DoB/Age	Ranking of event		
Name	DoB/Age	WS	WD	XD
Chen Hsuan-yu	1 June 1993 (age 33)	437	419	–
Tiffany Ho	6 January 1998 (age 28)	96	264	–
Gronya Somerville	10 May 1995 (age 31)	–	65	44
Kaitlyn Ea	25 June 2003 (age 23)	–	65	324
Angela Yu	8 March 2003 (age 23)	–	41	130
Setyana Mapasa	15 August 1995 (age 31)	–	41	–
Louisa Ma	26 November 1994 (age 31)	184	348	281
Joyce Choong	20 December 1995 (age 30)	–	207	413
Bernice Teoh	4 October 2003 (age 23)	131	457	144
Sydney Go	11 June 2004 (age 22)	287	357	–
