= Kiribati national badminton team =

Kiribati
- Association: Kiribati Badminton Federation (KBF)
- Confederation: BO (Oceania)
- President: Henry Bwebweata

BWF ranking
- Current ranking: Unranked (2 January 2024)
- Highest ranking: 111 (1 October 2019)

Oceania Mixed Team Championships
- Appearances: 1 (first in 2014)
- Best result: Group stage

The Kiribati national badminton team (Gilbertese: Koraki nu aomata ae maramara badminton ni Kiribati) represents Kiribati in international badminton team competitions and is organized by the Kiribati Badminton Federation (Gilbertese: Raorao ni badminton ni Kiribati), the governing body for badminton in Kiribati. The Gilbertese team competed in the Pacific Games.

The Gilbertese team is part of the Badminton Oceania confederation.

== History ==
Badminton in Kiribati started in the late 2000s. The Kiribati Badminton Federation then partnered with the Badminton World Federation and organized the Shuttle Time program across the country to develop badminton in the country. In 2019, former Australian national player Dean Lewis was appointed as the national coach for the Gilbertese team.

=== Mixed team ===
The Gilbertese mixed team first competed in the 2014 Oceania Badminton Championships mixed team event. The team were eliminated in the group stages. The team then competed in the Badminton at the 2019 Pacific Games and lost in the group stages.

== Competitive record ==
=== Pacific Games ===
==== Mixed team ====
Year	Result
2019	7th place

=== Oceania Team Championships ===
==== Mixed team ====
Year	Result
2014	Group stage

== Staff ==
The following list shows the coaching staff for the Kiribati national badminton team.

Name	Role
(Australia) Dean Lewis	Head coach

== Players ==
=== Current squad ===
As of 2 January 2024

==== Men's team ====
Name	DoB/Age	Ranking of event		
Name	DoB/Age	MS	MD	XD
Timwata Kabaua	1993 (age 31–32)	–	–	–
Tooma Teuaika	1993 (age 31–32)	–	–	–

==== Women's team ====
Name	DoB/Age	Ranking of event		
Name	DoB/Age	WS	WD	XD
Tinabora Tekeiaki	5 January 1986 (age 39)	–	–	–
Teitiria Utimawa	15 January 1993 (age 32)	–	–	–

=== Previous squads ===
==== Oceania Team Championships ====
- Mixed team: 2014

==== Pacific Games ====
- Mixed team: 2019
