= 2026 Oceania Badminton Championships =

Tournament details
- Dates: 8–12 February (individual event); 13–15 February (mixed team event)
- Edition: 20th
- Venue: Badminton North Harbour Centre
- Location: Forrest Hill, Auckland, New Zealand

The 2026 Oceania Badminton Championships (officially known as the Victor Oceania Championships 2026 for sponsorship reasons) was a continental badminton championship in Oceania sanctioned by Badminton Oceania, and the Badminton World Federation. The individual events were held from 8 to 12 and the mixed team was held from 13 to 15 February 2026, respectively.

== Tournament ==
The 2026 Oceania Badminton Championships is the 20th edition of the Oceania Championships.

This tournament is organized by Badminton North Harbour and Badminton Oceania, and sanctioned by the Badminton World Federation.

=== Venue ===
The tournament was held at the Badminton North Harbour Centre, Forrest Hill, Auckland, New Zealand.

=== Point distribution ===
Below is the point distribution table for each phase of the tournament based on the BWF points system of the Oceania Badminton Championships, which is equivalent to a BWF International Challenge event.

Winner	Runner-up	3/4	5/8	9/16	17/32	33/64
4,000	3,400	2,800	2,200	1,520	920	360

=== Prize pool ===
Below is the prize money for the individual event.

Event	Winner	Finalist	Semi-finals
Singles	NZD900	NZD600	NZD250
Doubles	NZD900	NZD600	NZD250

== Medal summary ==
=== Medalists ===
Event	Gold	Silver	Bronze
Men's singles	(Australia) Shrey Dhand	(New Zealand) Edward Lau	(New Zealand) Ricky Cheng
Men's singles	(Australia) Shrey Dhand	(New Zealand) Edward Lau	(Australia) Ephraim Stephen Sam
Women's singles	(New Zealand) Shaunna Li	(Australia) Tiffany Ho	(New Zealand) Amy Wang
Women's singles	(New Zealand) Shaunna Li	(Australia) Tiffany Ho	(Australia) Jesslyn Carrisia
Men's doubles	(Australia) Rizky Hidayat (Australia) Jack Yu	(New Zealand) Chris Benzie (New Zealand) Dylan Soedjasa	(New Zealand) Raphael Chris Deloy (New Zealand) Adam Jeffrey
Men's doubles	(Australia) Rizky Hidayat (Australia) Jack Yu	(New Zealand) Chris Benzie (New Zealand) Dylan Soedjasa	(New Zealand) Vincent Tao (New Zealand) Dacmen Vong
Women's doubles	(Australia) Gronya Somerville (Australia) Angela Yu	(New Zealand) Berry Ng (New Zealand) Amanda Ting	(Australia) Jesslyn Carrisia (Australia) Faye Huo
Women's doubles	(Australia) Gronya Somerville (Australia) Angela Yu	(New Zealand) Berry Ng (New Zealand) Amanda Ting	(Australia) Jazmine Lam (Australia) Lim Yee-yuan
Mixed doubles	(Australia) Andika Ramadiansyah (Australia) Angela Yu	(New Zealand) Ricky Cheng (New Zealand) Natalie Ting	(Australia) Rizky Hidayat (Australia) Gronya Somerville
Mixed doubles	(Australia) Andika Ramadiansyah (Australia) Angela Yu	(New Zealand) Ricky Cheng (New Zealand) Natalie Ting	(New Zealand) Adam Jeffrey (New Zealand) Laura Lin

=== Medal table ===
* Host nation (New Zealand)

Rank	Nation	Gold	Silver	Bronze	Total
1	Australia	4	1	5	10
2	New Zealand*	1	4	5	10
Totals (2 entries)		5	5	10	20

== Men's singles ==
=== Seeds ===
1. (New Zealand) Edward Lau (final)
2. (Australia) Jack Yu (quarter-finals)
3. (Australia) Ricky Tang (fourth round)
4. (Australia) Ephraim Stephen Sam (semi-finals)
5. (Australia) Asher Ooi (quarter-finals)
6. (Australia) Kai Chen Teoh (quarter-finals)
7. (Australia) Tan Zhi-ron (third round)
8. (Australia) Shrey Dhand (champion)
9. (Australia) Kayson Goh (third round)
10. (Australia) Jayden Lim (third round)
11. (New Zealand) Chris Benzie (fourth round)
12. (Australia) Takeru Kai (second round)
13. (Australia) Ken Richardson (fourth round)
14. (Australia) Pushkal Irusumalla (fourth round)
15. (Australia) Pit Seng Low (third round)
16. (New Zealand) Billy Li (first round)

=== Finals ===
Quarter-finals
1	(New Zealand) Edward Lau	21	21
5	(Australia) Asher Ooi	8	11
(Australia) Om Neelam	15	15
(New Zealand) Ricky Cheng	21	21
6	(Australia) Kai Chen Teoh	9	19
4	(Australia) Ephraim Stephen Sam	21	21
8	(Australia) Shrey Dhand	19	21	21
2	(Australia) Jack Yu	21	16	16

Semi-finals
1	(New Zealand) Edward Lau	21	19	21
(New Zealand) Ricky Cheng	12	21	8
4	(Australia) Ephraim Stephen Sam	21	8	15
8	(Australia) Shrey Dhand	17	21	21

Final
1	(New Zealand) Edward Lau	22	17	13
8	(Australia) Shrey Dhand	20	21	21

=== Top half ===
==== Section 1 ====
First round
(Australia) J Zhu	8	13
(New Zealand) D McMillan	21	21
(New Zealand) L Xu	21	21
(Fiji) R Loo	4	10
(New Caledonia) S Sarrazin	3	6
(Australia) Y X Lin	21	21
(New Zealand) J Wu	21	21
(Northern Mariana Islands) N Nate	9	16
(Cook Islands) D Akavi	9	4
(Australia) N Pham	21	21
(Australia) R Boopathy	21	21
(New Zealand) An Pang	8	7

Second round
1	(New Zealand) E Lau	21	21
(New Zealand) D McMillan	10	17
(New Zealand) L Xu	15	12
(Australia) Y X Lin	21	21
9	(Australia) K Goh	21	21
(New Zealand) J Wu	17	7
(Australia) N Pham	7	13
(Australia) R Boopathy	21	21

Third round
1	(New Zealand) E Lau	21	21
(Australia) Y X Lin	11	12
9	(Australia) K Goh	13	22	17
(Australia) R Boopathy	21	20	21

Fourth round
1	(New Zealand) E Lau	21	21
(Australia) R Boopathy	16	11

==== Section 2 ====
First round
(New Zealand) C Rambaud	21	21
(Fiji) A Caine	6	5
(New Caledonia) N Nicole	12	21
(New Zealand) E van der Ley	21	23
(Australia) Lim S-y	18	21	21
(New Zealand) A Dangi	21	16	7
14	(Australia) P Irusumalla	21	21
(New Zealand) C Wei	8	9
(Cook Islands) K Mataio	21	28
(New Zealand) Al Pang	16	26
(Australia) YZ Zhou	21	21
(New Caledonia) T Bourgeois	15	8
(New Zealand) J Virk	30	21
(French Polynesia) M Mi You	28	15

Second round
5	(Australia) A Ooi	21	21
(New Zealand) C Rambaud	10	15
(New Zealand) E van der Ley	21	18	21
(Australia) Lim S-y	18	21	14
14	(Australia) P Irusumalla	21	21
(Cook Islands) K Mataio	7	12
(Australia) YZ Zhou	15	17
(New Zealand) J Virk	21	21

Third round
5	(Australia) A Ooi	21	21
(New Zealand) E van der Ley	8	12
14	(Australia) P Irusumalla	21	21
(New Zealand) J Virk	10	12

Fourth round
5	(Australia) A Ooi	21	21
14	(Australia) P Irusumalla	17	9

==== Section 3 ====
First round
(French Polynesia) A Bernard	21	25	22
(Australia) W Lau	23	23	24
(Australia) N Santosa	18	9
(New Zealand) J X Tan	21	21
(New Caledonia) J Guyenne	19	20
(New Zealand) L Qin	21	22
10	(Australia) J Lim	w	/	o
(New Caledonia) H K Sargito
(New Zealand) T Yu	21	21
(Fiji) S Lin	7	6
(Cook Islands) E Mataio	8	11
(Australia) C H Lau	21	21
(New Zealand) J Ji	9	11
(Australia) O Neelam	21	21

Second round
3	(Australia) R Tang	21	21
(Australia) W Lau	11	12
(New Zealand) J X Tan	21	20	16
(Australia) L Qin	10	22	21
10	(Australia) J Lim	21	21
(Australia) T Yu	19	19
(Australia) C H Lau
(Australia) O Neelam	w	/	o

Third round
3	(Australia) R Tang	21	21
(New Zealand) L Qin	6	7
10	(Australia) J Lim	14	15
(Australia) O Neelam	21	21

Fourth round
3	(Australia) R Tang	21	15	13
(Australia) O Neelam	17	21	21

==== Section 4 ====
First round
(New Caledonia) J Milesi	9	15
(New Zealand) S Navarra	21	21
(Australia) F Huang	12	12
(New Zealand) R Cheng	21	21
(New Zealand) D Hu	w	/	o
(Australia) A Dolman
15	(Australia) P S Low	21	21
(New Caledonia) C N'Guela	7	12
(Fiji) HR Chen	5	3
(New Zealand) O Wu	21	21
(Australia) C Teo	21	21
(Australia) G Kular	5	6
(New Caledonia) B Rambaud	21	21
(Northern Mariana Islands) J Mallari	7	10

Second round
7	(Australia) Tan Z-r	21	21
(Australia) S Navarra	17	12
(New Zealand) R Cheng	21	21
(Australia) D Hu	14	6
15	(Australia) P S Low	21	21
(Australia) O Wu	13	19
(Australia) C Teo	13	21	21
(New Caledonia) B Rambaud	21	16	9

Third round
7	(Australia) Tan Z-r	19	15
(New Zealand) R Cheng	21	21
15	(Australia) P S Low	21	15	11
(Australia) C Teo	17	21	21

Fourth round
(New Zealand) R Cheng	21	21
(Australia) C Teo	9	11

=== Bottom half ===
==== Section 5 ====
First round
(Australia) J Xie	13	17
(French Polynesia) A Beaubois	21	21
(New Zealand) LY Zhu	21	16	18
(Australia) S Shen	18	21	21
(New Zealand) M Zhao	21	21
(New Caledonia) L Guyenne	13	13
(New Caledonia) T Sargito	5	17
12	(Australia) T Kai	21	21
(Australia) Y Jha	22	21
(New Zealand) SQ Tong	20	19
(Fiji) YL Li	4	3
(Australia) V Nguyen	21	21
(New Zealand) T Smith	21	21
(Cook Islands) B Lee	13	14

Second round
(French Polynesia) A Beaubois	21	21
(Australia) S Shen	12	16
(New Zealand) M Zhao	21	21
12	(Australia) T Kai	10	18
(Australia) Y Jha	13	21	19
(Australia) V Nguyen	21	14	21
(Australia) T Smith	10	5
6	(Australia) K C Teoh	21	21

Third round
(French Polynesia) A Beaubois	21	21
(New Zealand) M Zhao	14	10
(Australia) V Nguyen	16	11
6	(Australia) K C Teoh	21	21

Fourth round
(French Polynesia) A Beaubois	21	14	14
6	(Australia) K C Teoh	16	21	21

==== Section 6 ====
First round
(New Caledonia) J Le Breton	6	7
(Australia) Y H Luo	21	21
(Cook Islands) S Cowan	6	1
(New Zealand) J Jiang	21	21
(New Zealand) O Liu	6	5
(Australia) R Lydra	21	21
(Australia) R Joseph Biju	21	21
16	(New Zealand) B Li	11	8
(New Zealand) A Lee	21	21
(Fiji) T Zhou	7	13
(New Zealand) M Hui	21	12	12
(Australia) E Ji	19	21	21
(New Caledonia) M Sargito	17	16
(New Zealand) A Galt	21	21

Second round
(Australia) Y H Luo	13	20
(New Zealand) J Jiang	21	22
(Australia) R Lydra	12	13
(Australia) R Joseph Biju	21	21
(New Zealand) A Lee	9	4
(Australia) E Ji	21	21
(New Zealand) A Galt	15	9
4	(Australia) E Stephen Sam	21	21

Third round
(Australia) J Jiang	17	10
(Australia) R Joseph Biju	21	21
(Australia) E Ji	13	18
4	(Australia) E Stephen Sam	21	21

Fourth round
(Australia) R Joseph Biju	14	20
4	(Australia) E Stephen Sam	21	22

==== Section 7 ====
First round
(Australia) J Li	21	15	20
(Australia) M Tam	17	21	22
(French Polynesia) E Maublanc	21	21
(Northern Mariana Islands) M Bautista	7	7
(Australia) E Ng	24	21
(Cook Islands) D Piakura	22	13
(New Caledonia) W Hnaissilin	5	5
11	(New Zealand) C Benzie	21	21
(New Zealand) A Bee	12	27	10
(Australia) K Lew	21	25	21
(Australia) A Nirmal	21	21
(New Zealand) A Coumbe	12	7
(New Zealand) I Chan	21	21
(New Caledonia) L Sargito	7	9

Second round
(Australia) M Tam	5	17
(French Polynesia) E Maublanc	21	21
(Australia) E Ng	5	4
11	(New Zealand) C Benzie	21	21
(Australia) K Lew	16	9
(Australia) A Nirmal	21	21
(New Zealand) I Chan	19	8
8	(Australia) S Dhand	21	21

Third round
(French Polynesia) E Maublanc	10	12
11	(New Zealand) C Benzie	21	21
(Australia) A Nirmal	17	21	10
8	(Australia) S Dhand	21	19	21

Fourth round
11	(New Zealand) C Benzie	21	15	12
8	(Australia) S Dhand	19	21	21

==== Section 8 ====
First round
(Cook Islands) E Patai	5	5
(New Zealand) R Soo-Jones	21	21
(New Zealand) D Vong	19	14
(Australia) E Stephen Sam	21	21
(Fiji) Y F Cao	5	7
(New Zealand) D Chan	21	21
(New Zealand) E Lei	21	21
(New Caledonia) A Milesi	11	13
(New Zealand) Z Vivero	6	13
(Australia) W Sayaphet	21	21
(Australia) V A Watihenu	14	16
(New Zealand) WX Li	21	21

Second round
(New Zealand) R Soo-Jones	12	14
(Australia) E Stephen Sam	21	21
(New Zealand) D Chan	15	19
13	(Australia) K Richardson	21	21
(New Zealand) E Lei	21	21
(Australia) W Sayaphet	8	9
(New Zealand) WX Li	13	21	8
2	(Australia) J Yu	21	14	21

Third round
(Australia) E Stephen Sam	17	17
13	(Australia) K Richardson	21	21
(New Zealand) E Lei	9	7
2	(Australia) J Yu	21	21

Fourth round
13	(Australia) K Richardson	14	21	19
2	(Australia) J Yu	21	4	21

== Women's singles ==
=== Seeds ===
1. (New Zealand) Shaunna Li (champion)
2. (Australia) Tiffany Ho (final)
3. (Australia) Bernice Teoh (second round)
4. (Australia) Yuelin Zhang (third round)
5. (Australia) Faye Huo (quarter-finals)
6. (New Zealand) Jenny Zhu (second round)
7. (Australia) Sydney Tjonadi (quarter-finals)
8. (Australia) Smrithi Adepu (quarter-finals)

=== Finals ===
Semi-finals
1	(New Zealand) Shaunna Li	21	21
(New Zealand) Amy Wang	19	11
(Australia) Jesslyn Carrisia	20	13
2	(Australia) Tiffany Ho	22	21

Final
1	(New Zealand) Shaunna Li	21	21
2	(Australia) Tiffany Ho	14	14

=== Top half ===
==== Section 1 ====
First round
(Cook Islands) T Nicholas-Herman	8	16
(Australia) S C Ong	21	21
(Australia) L Ma	21	21
(Fiji) L Chung	4	4
(New Caledonia) L Benlahoussine	7	3
(Australia) J Zheng	21	21
(New Caledonia) J Wongsodirono	6	6
(Australia) J P Krishnakumar	21	21
(New Zealand) S Lu	19	11
(Australia) A Qin	21	21
(Australia) I S Acharya	21	21
(French Polynesia) E Tau	6	5

Second round
1	(Australia) S Li	21	21
(Australia) S C Ong	8	10
(Australia) L Ma	21	21
(Australia) J Zheng	16	15
5	(Australia) F Huo	21	21
(Australia) J P Krishnakumar	12	9
(Australia) A Qin	21	15	15
(Australia) I S Acharya	15	21	21

Third round
1	(Australia) S Li	21	21
(Australia) L Ma	7	15
5	(Australia) F Huo	21	21
(Australia) I S Acharya	9	11

Quarter-finals
1	(Australia) S Li	21	21
5	(Australia) F Huo	16	13

==== Section 2 ====
First round
(French Polynesia) W Teheura	4	3
(New Zealand) A Wang	21	21
(New Zealand) J Zhao	21	21
(New Caledonia) O Darcheville	4	8
(Australia) A Wong	21	21
(Fiji) L Chen	5	5
8	(Australia) S Adepu	21	21
(French Polynesia) M Siao	3	10
(New Zealand) M Xu	21	21
(Australia) R Bairy	11	7
(New Caledonia) A Desert	3	7
(Australia) N Fang	21	21
(New Zealand) R Yang	21	21
(Northern Mariana Islands) S Malonzo	4	8

Second round
3	(Australia) B Teoh	16	19
(New Zealand) A Wang	21	21
(New Zealand) J Zhao	21	21
(Australia) A Wong	13	11
8	(Australia) S Adepu	21	21
(New Zealand) M Xu	11	9
(Australia) N Fang	21	21
(New Zealand) R Yang	13	16

Third round
(New Zealand) A Wang	19	21	21
(New Zealand) J Zhao	21	7	12
8	(Australia) S Adepu	18	21	21
(Australia) N Fang	21	7	18

Quarter-finals
(New Zealand) A Wang	15	21	21
8	(Australia) S Adepu	21	17	19

=== Bottom half ===
==== Section 3 ====
First round
(Cook Islands) M Karika	8	2
(New Zealand) YX Liu	21	21
(Fiji) Y Y Nong	4	4
(Australia) V Tjonadi	21	21
(New Caledonia) C Giusti	3	5
(Australia) M Ngo	21	21
(French Polynesia) M Mi You	11	14
6	(New Zealand) J Zhu	21	21
(New Zealand) JM Ellimoottil	2	9
(Australia) J Carrisia	21	21
(Australia) A Buomon	21	21
(New Caledonia) A Capitaine	11	4
(New Zealand) Y Xu	21	21
(Northern Mariana Islands) G Lansangan	4	5

Second round
(New Zealand) YX Liu	13	18
(Australia) V Tjonadi	21	21
(Australia) M Ngo	21	21
6	(New Zealand) J Zhu	15	16
(Australia) J Carrisia	21	16	21
(Australia) A Buomon	19	21	13
(New Zealand) Y Xu	21	16	18
4	(Australia) YL Zhang	15	21	21

Third round
(Australia) V Tjonadi	11	12
(Australia) M Ngo	21	21
(Australia) J Carrisia	21	21
4	(Australia) YL Zhang	15	14

Quarter-finals
(Australia) M Ngo	10	17
(Australia) J Carrisia	21	21

==== Section 4 ====
First round
(Australia) A Shen	21	21
(Fiji) JL Qiu	8	5
(New Zealand) A Zhang	21	21
(New Caledonia) K Moraldo	4	3
(Australia) A Lim	15	13
(New Zealand) M Cai	21	21
(French Polynesia) H Curet	12	21	11
(Australia) H Zhang	21	13	21
(Australia) I Yan	21	21
(New Zealand) L Cao	19	14
(New Zealand) XY Liang	21	21
(Cook Islands) L Toa	3	7

Second round
(Australia) A Shen	16	16
(New Zealand) A Zhang	21	21
(New Zealand) M Cai	6	8
7	(Australia) S Tjonadi	21	21
(Australia) H Zhang	21	21
(Australia) I Yan	16	18
(Australia) X Liang	14	21	11
2	(Australia) T Ho	21	18	21

Third round
(Australia) A Zhang	15	16
7	(Australia) S Tjonadi	21	21
(Australia) H Zhang	17	11
2	(Australia) T Ho	21	21

Quarter-finals
7	(Australia) S Tjonadi	15	7
2	(Australia) T Ho	21	23

== Men's doubles ==
=== Seeds ===
1. (New Zealand) Raphael Chris Deloy / Adam Jeffrey (semi-finals)
2. (New Zealand) Vincent Tao / Dacmen Vong (semi-finals)
3. (Australia) Phillip Halim / Landon Kurniawan (third round)
4. (New Zealand) Chan Yun Lung / Chance Cheng (quarter-finals)
5. (New Zealand) Chris Benzie / Dylan Soedjasa (final)
6. (Australia) Rizky Hidayat / Jack Yu (champions)
7. (Australia) Andika Ramadiansyah / Frederick Zhao (quarter-finals)
8. (New Zealand) Wenxuan Li / (Australia) Lim Shih-yuan (second round)

=== Finals ===
Semi-finals
1	(New Zealand) Raphael Chris Deloy (New Zealand) Adam Jeffrey	19	19
5	(New Zealand) Chris Benzie (New Zealand) Dylan Soedjasa	21	21
6	(Australia) Rizky Hidayat (Australia) Jack Yu	21	21
2	(New Zealand) Vincent Tao (New Zealand) Dacmen Vong	11	7

Final
5	(New Zealand) Chris Benzie (New Zealand) Dylan Soedjasa	17	9
6	(Australia) Rizky Hidayat (Australia) Jack Yu	21	21

=== Top half ===
==== Section 1 ====
First round
(New Caledonia) W Hnaisslin (New Caledonia) N Nicole	3	10
(Australia) J Lim (Australia) W S Ng	21	21
(Fiji) A Caine (Fiji) HR Chen	5	13
(New Zealand) E Lei (New Zealand) B Rambaud	21	21
(Australia) R Soo-Jones (New Zealand) C Wei	14	13
(Australia) F Huang (Australia) F Truong	21	21
(Australia) Y H Luo (Australia) L T H Pham	21	21
(Cook Islands) D Akavi (Cook Islands) D Piakura	14	13
(New Zealand) O Liu (New Zealand) LY Zhu	21	22
(New Caledonia) J Guyenne (New Caledonia) C N'Guela	16	20

Second round
1	(New Zealand) R C Deloy (New Zealand) A Jeffrey	21	21
(Australia) J Lim (Australia) W S Ng	15	16
(Australia) D Han (Australia) N Vercruysse	21	21
(New Zealand) E Lei (New Zealand) B Rambaud	15	14
8	(New Zealand) WX Li (Australia) S-y Lim	13	11
(Australia) F Huang (Australia) F Truong	21	21
(Australia) Y H Luo (Australia) L T H Pham	9	21	21
(Australia) O Liu (Australia) LY Zhu	21	15	11

Third round
1	(Australia) R C Deloy (Australia) A Jeffrey	21	21
(New Caledonia) D Han (New Caledonia) N Vercruysse	18	12
(Australia) F Huang (Australia) F Truong	21	21
(Australia) Y H Luo (Australia) L T H Pham	15	19

Quarter-finals
1	(Australia) R C Deloy (Australia) A Jeffrey	21	21
(Australia) F Huang (Australia) F Truong	16	15

==== Section 2 ====
First round
(Fiji) YL Li (Fiji) R Loo	14	11
(New Zealand) M Hui (New Zealand) L Qin	21	21
(New Zealand) J Mingoa (New Zealand) S Navarra	21	21
(New Caledonia) A Milesi (New Caledonia) J Milesi	13	12
(Australia) J Wang (Australia) C Yu	21	21
(French Polynesia) A Beaubois (French Polynesia) Y Jeandroz	14	13
(Australia) N Pham (Australia) C Teo	21	21
(Cook Islands) E Mataio (Cook Islands) K Mataio	12	4
(Northern Mariana Islands) M Bautista (Northern Mariana Islands) N Nate	6	12
(New Zealand) A Cai (New Zealand) T Miao	21	21
(New Caledonia) L Sargito (New Caledonia) S Sarrazin	8	5
(Australia) P S Low (Australia) E Ng	21	21

Second round
3	(Australia) P Halim (Australia) L Kurniawan	21	21
(New Zealand) M Hui (New Zealand) L Qin	18	15
(New Zealand) J Mingoa (New Zealand) S Navarra	15	22
(Australia) J Wang (Australia) C Yu	21	24
5	(New Zealand) C Benzie (New Zealand) D Soedjasa	21	21
(Australia) N Pham (Australia) C Teo	8	7
(New Zealand) A Cai (New Zealand) T Miao	21	21
(Australia) P S Low (Australia) E Ng	10	19

Third round
3	(Australia) P Halim (Australia) L Kurniawan	17	13
(Australia) J Wang (Australia) C Yu	21	24
5	(New Zealand) C Benzie (New Zealand) D Soedjasa	21	21
(New Zealand) A Cai (New Zealand) T Miao	10	6

Quarter-finals
(Australia) J Wang (Australia) C Yu	22	17	14
5	(New Zealand) C Benzie (New Zealand) D Soedjasa	20	21	21

=== Bottom half ===
==== Section 3 ====
First round
(Australia) R Lyora (Australia) W Sayaphet	16	15
(New Zealand) C Rambaud (New Zealand) O Wu	21	21
(New Caledonia) L Guyenne (New Caledonia) HK Sargito
(Fiji) S S Low (Fiji) T Zhou	w	/	o
(Northern Mariana Islands) J Mallari (Northern Mariana Islands) D Odicta	11	10
(Australia) A Bee (Australia) J X Tan	21	21
(New Caledonia) T Bourgeois (New Caledonia) J Le Breton	7	9
(Australia) R H Boopathy (Australia) A Nirmal	21	23
(New Zealand) J Wu (New Zealand) J Xie	21	21
(New Zealand) B Li (Australia) Tan Z-r	12	13
(French Polynesia) A Bernard (French Polynesia) E Maublanc	w	/	o
(Australia) CH Lau (Australia) K Lew

Second round
(New Zealand) C Rambaud (New Zealand) O Wu	21	21
(Fiji) S S Low (Fiji) T Zhou	9	2
(New Zealand) A Bee (New Zealand) J X Tan	7	15
6	(Australia) R Hidayat (Australia) J Yu	21	21
(Australia) R H Boopathy (Australia) A Nirmal	25	21
(New Zealand) J Wu (New Zealand) J Xie	23	15
(French Polynesia) A Bernard (French Polynesia) E Maublanc	19	12
4	(New Zealand) A Chan (New Zealand) C Cheng	21	21

Third round
(New Zealand) C Rambaud (New Zealand) O Wu	16	9
6	(Australia) R Hidayat (Australia) J Yu	21	21
(Australia) R H Boopathy (Australia) A Nirmal	15	13
4	(New Zealand) A Chan (New Zealand) C Cheng	21	21

Quarter-finals
6	(Australia) R Hidayat (Australia) J Yu	21	21
4	(New Zealand) A Chan (New Zealand) C Cheng	10	17

==== Section 4 ====
First round
(Australia) R J Biju (Australia) E Stephen Sam	21	21
(New Caledonia) M Sargito (New Caledonia) T Sargito	13	8
(French Polynesia) R Goguenheim (French Polynesia) M Mi You	22	19
(New Zealand) SQ Tong (New Zealand) L Xu	24	21
(New Zealand) A Coumbe (New Zealand) J Virk	15	14
(Australia) R Agustino (New Zealand) J Curtin	21	21
(Fiji) Y F Cao (Fiji) S Lin	12	11
(Cook Islands) S Cowan (Cook Islands) E Patai	21	21
(New Zealand) T Smith (New Zealand) M Zhang	17	21	10
(Australia) Y Jha (Australia) S Shen	21	16	21
(Australia) N Santosa (Australia) J Zhu	14	15
(Australia) V Nguyen (New Zealand) D Vong	21	21

Second round
(Australia) R J Biju (Australia) E Stephen Sam	16	21	21
(New Zealand) SQ Tong (New Zealand) L Xu	21	13	17
(Australia) R Agustino (New Zealand) J Curtin	6	15
7	(Australia) A Ramadiansyah (Australia) F Zhao	21	21
(Cook Islands) S Cowan (Cook Islands) E Patai	11	10
(Australia) Y Jha (Australia) S Shen	21	21
(Australia) V Nguyen (New Zealand) D Vong	11	23
2	(New Zealand) V Tao (New Zealand) D Vong	21	25

Third round
(Australia) R J Biju (Australia) E Stephen Sam	19	10
7	(Australia) A Ramadiansyah (Australia) F Zhao	21	21
(Australia) Y Jha (Australia) S Shen	12	14
2	(New Zealand) V Tao (New Zealand) D Vong	21	21

Quarter-finals
7	(Australia) A Ramadiansyah (Australia) F Zhao	22	20	17
2	(New Zealand) V Tao (New Zealand) D Vong	20	22	21

== Women's doubles ==
=== Seeds ===
1. (Australia) Gronya Somerville / Angela Yu (champions)
2. (Australia) Jazmine Lam / Lim Yee-yuan (semi-finals)
3. (Australia) Sydney Tjonadi / Victoria Tjonadi (quarter-finals)
4. (New Zealand) Camellia Zhou / Jenny Zhu (quarter-finals)
5. (Australia) Xiwen Liang / Mimi Ngo (second round)
6. (Australia) Priska Kustiadi / Maureen Clarissa Wijaya (quarter-finals)
7. (Australia) Smrithi Adepu / (New Zealand) Amy Wang (third round)
8. (Australia) Helen Chan / Michelle Tam (third round)

=== Finals ===
Semi-finals
1	(Australia) Gronya Somerville (Australia) Angela Yu	21	21
(Australia) Jesslyn Carrisia (Australia) Faye Huo	10	5
(New Zealand) Berry Ng (New Zealand) Amanda Ting	12	21	21
2	(Australia) Jazmine Lam (Australia) Lim Yee-yuan	21	19	18

Final
1	(Australia) Gronya Somerville (Australia) Angela Yu	21	21
(New Zealand) Berry Ng (New Zealand) Amanda Ting	9	9

=== Top half ===
==== Section 1 ====
First round

Second round
1	(Australia) G Somerville (Australia) A Yu	21	21
(New Zealand) XY Liang (Australia) A Shen	5	9
(New Zealand) S Wu (New Zealand) A Zhang	16	13
(Australia) I S Acharya (Australia) A Bijomon	21	21
7	(Australia) S Adepu (New Zealand) A Wang	21	21
(Australia) K Lew (Australia) S Ung	13	19
(French Polynesia) M Mi You (French Polynesia) W Teheura	9	8
(New Zealand) YX Liu (New Zealand) N Ting	21	21

Third round
1	(Australia) G Somerville (Australia) A Yu	21	21
(Australia) I S Acharya (Australia) A Bijomon	8	14
7	(Australia) S Adepu (New Zealand) A Wang	21	20	11
(New Zealand) YX Liu (New Zealand) N Ting	17	22	21

Quarter-finals
1	(Australia) G Somerville (Australia) A Yu	21	21
(New Zealand) YX Liu (New Zealand) N Ting	15	11

==== Section 2 ====
First round
(New Caledonia) O Darcheville (New Caledonia) J Wongsodirono	8	12
(Australia) J Carrisia (Australia) F Huo	21	21

Second round
3	(Australia) S Tjonadi (Australia) V Tjonadi	21	21
(Australia) M Xu (Australia) R Yang	10	6
(Cook Islands) T Nicholas-Herman (Cook Islands) L Toa	9	9
(New Zealand) J P Krishnakumar (New Zealand) S Lu	21	21
8	(Australia) H Chan (Australia) M Tam	21	21
(Northern Mariana Islands) G Lansangan (Northern Mariana Islands) S Malonzo	11	14
(New Zealand) L Lin (New Zealand) A Tagle	21	14	14
(Australia) J Carrisia (Australia) F Huo	12	21	21

Third round
3	(Australia) S Tjonadi (Australia) V Tjonadi	21	21
(New Zealand) J P Krishnakumar (New Zealand) S Lu	13	16
8	(Australia) H Chan (Australia) M Tam	9	15
(Australia) J Carrisia (Australia) F Huo	21	21

Quarter-finals
3	(Australia) S Tjonadi (Australia) V Tjonadi	19	29
(Australia) J Carrisia (Australia) F Huo	21	30

=== Bottom half ===
==== Section 3 ====
First round
(Fiji) L Chung (New Caledonia) K Moraldo	7	9
(New Zealand) Y Xu (New Zealand) R Zhang	21	21

Second round
(Australia) YB Xu (Australia) R Zhang	21	21
(New Caledonia) A Desert (New Caledonia) C Giusti	5	4
(New Zealand) B Ng (New Zealand) A Ting	13	21	21
5	(Australia) XW Liang (Australia) M Ngo	21	17	17
(French Polynesia) L Ancel Nay (French Polynesia) H Curet	21	21
(Australia) S C Ong (Australia) YL Zhang	17	15
(Australia) S T Mushini (Australia) A Wong	19	16
4	(New Zealand) C Zhou (New Zealand) J Zhu	21	21

Semifinals
(New Zealand) YB Xu (New Zealand) R Zhang	7	13
(New Zealand) B Ng (New Zealand) A Ting	21	21
(French Polynesia) L Ancel Nay (French Polynesia) H Curet	19	18
4	(New Zealand) C Zhou (New Zealand) J Zhu	21	21

Final
(New Zealand) B Ng (New Zealand) A Ting	22	21
4	(New Zealand) C Zhou (New Zealand) J Zhu	20	19

==== Section 4 ====
Round of 64
(New Caledonia) L Benlahoussine (New Caledonia) A Capitaine	6	3
(Australia) G Galvez (Australia) Q Yang	21	21

Round of 32
(New Zealand) G Galvez (New Zealand) QX Yang	21	21
(French Polynesia) M Siao (French Polynesia) E Tau	6	9
(New Zealand) M Cai (New Zealand) L Cao	19	18
6	(Australia) P Kustiadi (Australia) M C Wijaya	21	21
(Cook Islands) T George (Cook Islands) M Karika	2	8
(New Zealand) J Villegas (New Zealand) J Zhao	21	21
(Fiji) L Chen (Fiji) JL Qiu	5	2
2	(Australia) J Lam (Australia) Y-y Lim	21	21

Round of 16
(New Zealand) G Galvez (New Zealand) QX Yang	16	13
6	(Australia) P Kustiadi (Australia) M C Wijaya	21	21
(New Zealand) J Villegas (New Zealand) J Zhao	14	19
2	(Australia) J Lam (Australia) Y-y Lim	21	21

Quarter-finals
6	(Australia) P Kustiadi (Australia) M C Wijaya	13	22
2	(Australia) J Lam (Australia) Y-y Lim	21	24

== Mixed doubles ==
=== Seeds ===
1. (New Zealand) Edward Lau / Shaunna Li (quarter-finals)
2. (Australia) Kai Chen Teoh / Kai Qi Teoh (second round)
3. (Australia) Frederick Zhao / Jazmine Lam (fourth round)
4. (Australia) Jayden Lim / Victoria Tjonadi (fourth round)
5. (Australia) Rizky Hidayat / Gronya Somerville (semi-finals)
6. (Australia) Rio Agustino / Priska Kustiadi (third round)
7. (New Zealand) Raphael Chris Deloy / Yanxi Liu (quarter-finals)
8. (Australia) Chauncey Yu / Lim Yee-Yuan (second round)
9. (Australia) Ephraim Stephen Sam / Maureen Clarissa Wijaya (fourth round)
10. (New Zealand) Dacmen Vong / Amanda Ting (fourth round)
11. (Australia) Roshan Joseph Biju / Joanne Zheng (second round)
12. (French Polynesia) Antoine Beaubois / Heirautea Curet (fourth round)
13. (Australia) Andika Ramadiansyah / Angela Yu (champions)
14. (Northern Mariana Islands) Jude Dominguez Mallari / Genelyn Joy Mirando Lansangan (second round)
15. (New Zealand) Dylan Soedjasa / Justine Villegas (quarter-finals)
16. (Northern Mariana Islands) Dave Bryan Olpindo Odicta / Shaina Angela Dael Malonzo (second round)

=== Finals ===
Quarter-finals
1	(New Zealand) Edward Lau (New Zealand) Shaunna Li	12	26	11
5	(Australia) Rizky Hidayat (Australia) Gronya Somerville	21	24	21
13	(Australia) Andika Ramadiansyah (Australia) Angela Yu	21	21
(New Zealand) Vincent Tao (New Zealand) Alyssa Tagle	11	17
15	(New Zealand) Dylan Soedjasa (New Zealand) Justine Villegas	13	11
(New Zealand) Adam Jeffrey (New Zealand) Laura Lin	21	21
7	(New Zealand) Raphael Chris Deloy (New Zealand) Yanxi Liu	14	10
(New Zealand) Ricky Cheng (New Zealand) Natalie Ting	21	21

Semi-finals
5	(Australia) Rizky Hidayat (Australia) Gronya Somerville	21	16	19
13	(Australia) Andika Ramadiansyah (Australia) Angela Yu	11	21	21
(New Zealand) Adam Jeffrey (New Zealand) Laura Lin	17	21	21
(New Zealand) Ricky Cheng (New Zealand) Natalie Ting	21	12	23

Final
13	(Australia) Andika Ramadiansyah (Australia) Angela Yu	21	21
(New Zealand) Ricky Cheng (New Zealand) Natalie Ting	13	16

=== Top half ===
==== Section 1 ====
First round
(Fiji) R Loo (Fiji) Y Y Nong	12	18
(New Caledonia) W Hnaissilin (New Caledonia) L Benlahoussine	21	21

Second round
1	(New Zealand) E Lau (New Zealand) S Li	21	21
(Australia) L Kurniawan (Australia) S Ung	7	11
(Australia) F Truong (Australia) K Lew	21	21
(French Polynesia) E Maublanc (French Polynesia) W Teheura	11	13
11	(Australia) R Joseph Biju (Australia) J Zheng	21	19	16
(New Zealand) D Hu (New Zealand) A Ung	10	21	21
(New Zealand) J Li (New Zealand) S Lu	21	21
(New Caledonia) W Hnaissilin (New Caledonia) L Benlahoussine	9	15

Third round
1	(New Zealand) E Lau (New Zealand) S Li	21	21
(Australia) F Truong (Australia) K Lew	10	14
(New Zealand) D Hu (New Zealand) A Ung	21	21
(New Zealand) J Li (New Zealand) S Lu	8	15

Fourth round
1	(New Zealand) E Lau (New Zealand) S Li	21	21
(New Zealand) D Hu (New Zealand) A Ung	7	6

==== Section 2 ====
First round
(New Zealand) O Liu (New Zealand) A Zhang	21	21
(Cook Islands) E Patai (Cook Islands) L Toa	4	5

Second round
5	(Australia) R Hidayat (Australia) G Somerville	w	/	o
(New Caledonia) H Kasimun Sargito (New Caledonia) K Moraldo
(Australia) A Nirmal (Australia) S T Mushini	21	21
(New Zealand) D Vong (New Zealand) G Galvez	14	17
16	(Northern Mariana Islands) D Odicta (Northern Mariana Islands) S Malonzo	18	12
(Australia) M Chan (Australia) S Wang	21	21
(Australia) L T H Pham (Australia) A Qin	21	21
(New Zealand) O Liu (New Zealand) A Zhang	14	19

Third round
5	(Australia) R Hidayat (Australia) G Somerville	21	21
(Australia) A Nirmal (Australia) S T Mushini	7	5
(Australia) M Chan (Australia) S Wang	14	16
(Australia) L T H Pham (Australia) A Qin	21	21

Fourth round
5	(Australia) R Hidayat (Australia) G Somerville	21	21
(Australia) L T H Pham (Australia) Y Qin	11	13

==== Section 3 ====
First round
(French Polynesia) R Goguenheim (French Polynesia) E Tau	8	13
(New Zealand) D McMillan (New Zealand) C Zhou	21	21

Second round
3	(Australia) F Zhao (Australia) J Lam	14	21	22
(New Zealand) J Curtin (Australia) YR Zhang	21	18	20
(Australia) M Tam (Australia) M Tam	13	12
(New Zealand) O Wu (New Zealand) QX Yang	21	21
13	(Australia) A Ramadiansyah (Australia) A Yu	21	21
(New Zealand) WX Li (New Zealand) R Zhang	4	8
(Australia) N Santosa (Australia) A Lim	6	13
(New Zealand) D McMillan (New Zealand) C Zhou	21	21

Third round
3	(Australia) F Zhao (Australia) J Lam	21	21
(New Zealand) O Wu (New Zealand) QX Yang	9	17
13	(Australia) A Ramadiansyah (Australia) A Yu	21	16	21
(New Zealand) D McMillan (New Zealand) C Zhou	13	21	16

Fourth round
3	(Australia) F Zhao (Australia) J Lam	11	9
13	(Australia) A Ramadiansyah (Australia) A Yu	21	21

==== Section 4 ====
First round
(Fiji) HR Chen (Fiji) L Chung	21	21
(New Caledonia) A Milesi (New Caledonia) A Desert	15	17

Second round
8	(Australia) C Yu (Australia) Y-y Lim	17	20
(New Zealand) V Tao (New Zealand) A Tagle	21	22
(New Zealand) W Lau (New Zealand) R Yang	21	21
(French Polynesia) M Mi You (French Polynesia) M Siao	6	9
10	(New Zealand) D Vong (New Zealand) A Ting	21	21
(Australia) D Zhou (Australia) S C Ong	9	7
(Australia) Y Jha (Australia) R Bairy	21	21
(Fiji) HR Chen (Fiji) L Chung	10	9

Third round
(New Zealand) V Tao (New Zealand) A Tagle	21	21
(New Zealand) W Lau (New Zealand) R Yang	11	11
10	(New Zealand) D Vong (New Zealand) A Ting	21	21
(Australia) Y Jha (Australia) R Bairy	7	8

Fourth round
(New Zealand) V Tao (New Zealand) A Tagle	21	21
10	(New Zealand) D Vong (New Zealand) A Ting	13	13

=== Bottom half ===
==== Section 5 ====
First round
(Australia) S-y Lim (New Zealand) A Wang	21	21
(Fiji) S S Low (Fiji) JL Qiu	6	6
(Australia) N Vercruysse (Australia) L Ma	21	21
(New Zealand) E Lei (New Zealand) YB Xu	12	16

Second round
(Australia) S-y Lim (New Zealand) A Wang	21	21
(Australia) E Ji (Australia) A Wong	17	17
(Australia) W S Ng (Australia) J Carrisia	14	10
15	(New Zealand) D Soedjasa (New Zealand) J Villegas	21	21
(Australia) N Vercruysse (Australia) L Ma	21	21
(French Polynesia) Y Jeandroz (French Polynesia) L Ancel Nay	13	19
(Cook Islands) S Cowan (Cook Islands) T Nicholas-Herman	5	3
6	(Australia) R Agustino (Australia) P Kustiadi	21	21

Third round
(Australia) S-y Lim (New Zealand) A Wang	11	12
15	(New Zealand) D Soedjasa (New Zealand) J Villegas	21	21
(Australia) N Vercruysse (Australia) L Ma	21	21
6	(Australia) R Agustino (Australia) P Kustiadi	17	14

Fourth round
15	(New Zealand) D Soedjasa (New Zealand) J Villegas	22	21
(Australia) N Vercruysse (Australia) L Ma	20	16

==== Section 6 ====
First round
(New Zealand) A Jeffrey (New Zealand) L Lin	21	21
(Australia) Y X Lin (Australia) M Ngo	16	16

Second round
(New Zealand) A Jeffrey (New Zealand) L Lin	21	21
(New Zealand) S Navarra (New Zealand) B Ng	11	14
(New Zealand) SQ Tong (New Zealand) S Wu	22	21
14	(Northern Mariana Islands) J Mallari (Northern Mariana Islands) G Lansangan	20	11
(New Zealand) J X Tan (New Zealand) L Cao	16	19
(Australia) O Neelam (Australia) I S Acharya	21	21
(New Caledonia) N Nicole (New Caledonia) J Wongsodijrono	6	7
4	(Australia) J Lim (Australia) V Tjonadi	21	21

Third round
(New Zealand) A Jeffrey (New Zealand) L Lin	21	21
(New Zealand) SQ Tong (New Zealand) S Wu	6	10
(Australia) O Neelam (Australia) I S Acharya	8	15
4	(Australia) J Lim (Australia) V Tjonadi	21	21

Fourth round
(New Zealand) A Jeffrey (New Zealand) L Lin	22	21
4	(Australia) J Lim (Australia) V Tjonadi	20	16

==== Section 7 ====
First round
(Australia) E Stephen Sam (Australia) S Adepu	21	21
(Cook Islands) D Akavi (Cook Islands) M Karika	8	8

Second round
(Australia) E Stephen Sam (Australia) S Adepu	21	21
(French Polynesia) A Bernard (French Polynesia) M Mi You	15	19
(New Zealand) B Rambaud (New Zealand) J Zhao	10	26
9	(Australia) E Stephen Sam (Australia) M C Wijaya	21	28
(Australia) C Teo (Australia) X Liang	21	17	21
(New Zealand) J Wu (New Zealand) M Cai	11	21	7
(Australia) J Wang (Australia) S Tjonadi	14	21	18
7	(New Zealand) R C Deloy (New Zealand) YX Liu	21	17	21

Third round
(Australia) E Stephen Sam (Australia) S Adepu	19	14
9	(Australia) E Stephen Sam (Australia) M C Wijaya	21	21
(Australia) C Teo (Australia) XW Liang	13	12
7	(New Zealand) R C Deloy (New Zealand) YX Liu	21	21

Fourth round
9	(Australia) E Stephen Sam (Australia) M C Wijaya	23	9	11
7	(New Zealand) R C Deloy (New Zealand) YX Liu	21	21	21

==== Section 8 ====
First round
(New Caledonia) C N'Guela (New Caledonia) C Giusti	11	15
(Australia) S Shen (Australia) A Shen	21	21

Second round
(Australia) S Shen (Australia) A Shen	21	21
(Fiji) YL Li (Fiji) L Chen	4	11
(New Zealand) R Soo-Jones (New Zealand) J M Ellimoottil	13	10
12	(French Polynesia) A Beaubois (French Polynesia) H Curet	21	21
(New Zealand) T Miao (New Zealand) J P Krishnakumar	10	14
(Australia) S Dhand (Australia) A Bijumon	21	21
(New Zealand) R Cheng (New Zealand) N Ting	21	21
2	(Australia) K C Teoh (Australia) B Teoh	17	7

Third round
(Australia) S Shen (Australia) A Shen	21	15	15
12	(French Polynesia) A Beaubois (French Polynesia) H Curet	14	21	21
(Australia) S Dhand (Australia) A Bijumon	14	21	11
(New Zealand) R Cheng (New Zealand) N Ting	21	15	21

Fourth round
12	(French Polynesia) A Beaubois (French Polynesia) H Curet	10	11
(New Zealand) R Cheng (New Zealand) N Ting	21	21
