= New Zealand national badminton team =

National badminton team representing New Zealand

New Zealand
- Association: Badminton New Zealand (BNZ)
- Confederation: BO (Oceania)
- President: Ian Willans

BWF ranking
- Current ranking: 49 ▼1 (2 January 2024)
- Highest ranking: 21 (3 October 2013)

Sudirman Cup
- Appearances: 11 (first in 1989)
- Best result: Group stage

Thomas Cup
- Appearances: 7 (first in 1970)
- Best result: Group stage

Uber Cup
- Appearances: 6 (first in 1960)
- Best result: Semi-finals (1960, 1972)

Oceania Mixed Team Championships
- Appearances: 12 (first in 1999)
- Best result: Champions (2004, 2006, 2008)

Oceania Men's Team Championships
- Appearances: 8 (first in 2004)
- Best result: Champions (2004, 2006, 2008, 2012, 2016)

Oceania Women's Team Championships
- Appearances: 8 (first in 2004)
- Best result: Champions (2006, 2008)

The New Zealand national badminton team (Māori: kapa pūkura o Aotearoa) represents New Zealand in international badminton team competitions. The best result the national team has produced on the international stage was being the semifinalist at the Uber Cup in 1960 and 1972 respectively.

It is controlled by Badminton New Zealand, the governing body for badminton in New Zealand. In February 2018, Danish badminton player, Rikke Olsen Siegemund was assigned to be the coach of the national team.

== Competitive record ==
=== Thomas Cup ===
Year	Result
(England) 1949	Did not enter
(Colony of Singapore) 1952	Did not enter
(Colony of Singapore) 1955	Did not qualify
(Colony of Singapore) 1958	Did not qualify
(Indonesia) 1961	Did not qualify
(Japan) 1964	Did not qualify
(Indonesia) 1967	Did not qualify
(Malaysia) 1970	First round inter-zone
(Indonesia) 1973	Did not qualify
(Thailand) 1976	Did not qualify
(Indonesia) 1979	Did not qualify
(England) 1982	Did not qualify
(Malaysia) 1984	Did not qualify
(Indonesia) 1986	Did not qualify
(Malaysia) 1988	Did not qualify
(Japan) 1990	Did not qualify
(Malaysia) 1992	Did not qualify
(Indonesia) 1994	Did not qualify
(Hong Kong) 1996	Did not qualify
(Hong Kong) 1998	Did not qualify
(Malaysia) 2000	Did not enter
(China) 2002	Did not qualify
(Indonesia) 2004	Round of 16
(Japan) 2006	Round of 16
(Indonesia) 2008	Round of 16
(Malaysia) 2010	Did not qualify
(China) 2012	Group stage
(India) 2014	Did not enter
(China) 2016	Group stage
(Thailand) 2018	Did not qualify
(Denmark) 2020	Did not qualify
(Thailand) 2022	Withdrew (Note: New Zealand withdrew from the tournament due to a significant number of their squad being unable to participate after testing positive for COVID-19. They were replaced by the United States as no other Oceanian member association was able to fulfil the continental quota place. Hong Kong and Spain, the next highest ranking member associations (overall), were also unable to participate.)
(China) 2024	Did not qualify
(Denmark) 2026	Did not qualify
(N/A) 2028	TBD
(N/A) 2030	TBD

=== Uber Cup ===
Year	Result
(England) 1957	Did not qualify
(United States) 1960	(bronze) Second round inter-zone
(United States) 1963	First round inter-zone
(New Zealand) 1966	Did not qualify
(Japan) 1969	Did not qualify
(Japan) 1972	(bronze) Second round inter-zone
(Indonesia) 1975	Did not qualify
(New Zealand) 1978	First round inter-zone
(Japan) 1981	Did not qualify
(Malaysia) 1984	Did not qualify
(Indonesia) 1986	Did not qualify
(Malaysia) 1988	Did not qualify
(Japan) 1990	Did not qualify
(Malaysia) 1992	Did not qualify
(Indonesia) 1994	Did not qualify
(Hong Kong) 1996	Did not qualify
(Hong Kong) 1998	Did not qualify
(Malaysia) 2000	Did not enter
(China) 2002	Did not qualify
(Indonesia) 2004	Did not qualify
(Japan) 2006	Round of 16
(Indonesia) 2008	Round of 16
(Malaysia) 2010	Did not qualify
(China) 2012	Did not qualify
(India) 2014	Did not enter
(China) 2016	Did not qualify
(Thailand) 2018	Did not qualify
(Denmark) 2020	Did not qualify
(Thailand) 2022	Did not enter
(China) 2024	Did not qualify
(Denmark) 2026	Did not qualify
(N/A) 2028	TBD
(N/A) 2030	TBD

=== Sudirman Cup ===
Year	Result
(Indonesia) 1989	Group 5 Promoted − 19th
(Denmark) 1991	Group 4 − 17th
(England) 1993	Group 4 − 16th
(Switzerland) 1995	Group 4 − 16th
(Scotland) 1997	Group 3 − 18th
(Denmark) 1999	Did not enter
(Spain) 2001	Group 4 − 25th
(Netherlands) 2003	Did not enter
(China) 2005	Group 3 − 19th
(Scotland) 2007	Group 3 − 21st
(China) 2009	Did not enter
(China) 2011	Did not enter
(Malaysia) 2013	Group 3 − 26th
(China) 2015	Did not enter
(Australia) 2017	Group 2 − 19th
(China) 2019	Group 3 − 26th
(Finland) 2021	Did not enter
(China) 2023	Did not qualify
(China) 2025	Did not qualify
(N/A) 2027	TBD
(N/A) 2029	TBD

=== Commonwealth Games ===
==== Men's team ====
Year	Result
(Malaysia) 1998	(bronze) Semi-finals

==== Women's team ====
Year	Result
(Malaysia) 1998	Quarter-finals

==== Mixed team ====
Year	Result
(Canada) 1978	Fourth place
(Australia) 1982	Fourth place
(Scotland) 1986	Group stage
(New Zealand) 1990	Fourth place
(Canada) 1994	Group stage
(England) 2002	(bronze) Semi-finals
(Australia) 2006	Fourth place
(India) 2010	Quarter-finals
(Scotland) 2014	Group stage
(Australia) 2018	Did not enter
(England) 2022	Did not enter
(Australia) 2026	TBD

=== Oceania Team Championships ===
==== Men's team ====
Year	Result
2004	(gold) Champions
2006	(gold) Champions
2008	(gold) Champions
2010	(silver) Runners-up
2012	(gold) Champions
2016	(gold) Champions
2018	(silver) Runners-up
2020	(silver) Runners-up
2024	(silver) Runners-up
2026	(silver) Runners-up

==== Women's team ====
Year	Result
2004	(silver) Runners-up
2006	(gold) Champions
2008	(gold) Champions
2010	(silver) Runners-up
2012	(silver) Runners-up
2016	(silver) Runners-up
2018	(silver) Runners-up
2020	(silver) Runners-up
2024	(silver) Runners-up
2026	(silver) Runners-up

==== Mixed team ====
Year	Result
1999	(silver) Runners-up
2002	(silver) Runners-up
2004	(gold) Champions
2006	(gold) Champions
2008	(gold) Champions
2010	(silver) Runners-up
2012	(silver) Runners-up
2014	(silver) Runners-up
2016	(silver) Runners-up
2019	(silver) Runners-up
2023	(silver) Runners-up
2025	(silver) Runners-up

**Red border color indicates tournament was held on home soil.

== Junior competitive record ==
=== Suhandinata Cup ===
Year	Round	Pos
(China) 2000	Group stage	20th of 24
(South Africa) 2002	Did not enter	
(Canada) 2004	Did not enter	
(South Korea) 2006	Group Z2	23rd of 28
(New Zealand) 2007	Group W2	12th of 25
(India) 2008	Group Z	15th of 21
(Malaysia) 2009	Group W	16th of 21
(Mexico) 2010	Did not enter	
(Chinese Taipei) 2011	Did not enter	
(Japan) 2012	Did not enter	
(Thailand) 2013	Did not enter	
(Malaysia) 2014	Did not enter	
(Peru) 2015	Did not enter	
(Spain) 2016	Did not enter	
(Indonesia) 2017	Did not enter	
(Canada) 2018	Did not enter	
(Russia) 2019	Did not enter	
(Spain) 2022	Did not enter	
(United States) 2023	Group G	23rd of 38
(China) 2024	Group D	20th of 39
(India) 2025	Did not enter	
(Egypt) 2026	Group stage	20th of 47

=== Commonwealth Youth Games ===
==== Mixed team ====
Year	Result
(Australia) 2004	Group stage

=== Oceania Junior Team Championships ===
==== Mixed team ====
Year	Result
(Fiji) 2011	(gold) Champions
(French Polynesia) 2013	(silver) Runners-up
(New Zealand) 2015	(silver) Runners-up; (bronze) Third place (Team B)
(New Caledonia) 2017	(gold) Champions
(Australia) 2019	(silver) Runners-up
(New Zealand) 2023	(silver) Runners-up
(Northern Mariana Islands) 2025	(silver) Runners-up

**Red border color indicates tournament was held on home soil.

== Players ==
=== Current squad ===
As of 16 April 2025

==== Men's team ====
Name	DoB/Age	Ranking of event		
Name	DoB/Age	MS	MD	XD
Adam Jeffrey	1 April 2001 (age 25)	-	126	137
Dylan Soedjasa	13 January 1995 (age 31)	-	126	144
Edward Lau	22 February 2001 (age 25)	129	-	94
Raphael Deloy	26 August 2007 (age 19)	513	637	522

==== Women's team ====
Name	DoB/Age	Ranking of event		
Name	DoB/Age	WS	WD	XD
Camellia Zhou	13 April 2005 (age 21)	-	206	144
Jenny Zhu	22 March 2002 (age 24)	214	492	796
Josephine Zhao	15 December 2008 (age 17)	358	492	796
Justine Villegas	22 December 1995 (age 30)	-	702	137
Shaunna Li	7 August 2003 (age 23)	161	-	94
Yanxi Liu	17 November 2009 (age 16)	531	702	522

Coaches: Rikke Olsen and Oliver Leydon-Davis

=== Previous squads ===
==== Thomas Cup ====
- 2008, 2012, 2016
