= 2005 Sudirman Cup =

Tournament details
- Dates: 10 – 15 May
- Edition: 9th
- Level: International
- Venue: Capital Indoor Stadium
- Location: Beijing, China

The 2005 Sudirman Cup was the 9th tournament of the World Mixed Team Badminton Championships of Sudirman Cup. It was held from May 10 to May 15, 2005, in Beijing, China.

== Host city selection ==
Beijing and Glasgow submitted bids for the competition. Beijing was confirmed as the host during 2003 IBF council meeting in Eindhoven.

== Teams ==
41 teams around the world took part in this tournament. Geographically, they were 22 from Europe, 13 teams from Asia, 3 from Americas, two from Oceania and one from Africa. This edition also saw the expansion of Group 1 to 8 teams.

== Results ==
=== Group 1 ===
==== Subgroup 1A ====
Team one	Team two	Score
Denmark	England	3–2
South Korea	Thailand	4–1
Denmark	Thailand	4–1
South Korea	England	5–0
Denmark	South Korea	3–2
England	Thailand	4–1

==== Subgroup 1B ====
Team one	Team two	Score
China	Sweden	5–0
Indonesia	Hong Kong	4–1
China	Hong Kong	5–0
Indonesia	Sweden	4–1
China	Indonesia	5–0
Hong Kong	Sweden	4–1

==== Playoff ====
Team one	Team two	Score	Notes
England	Hong Kong	3-1	5th-6th
Thailand	Sweden	3-0	7th-8th

==== Semi-finals ====
Team one	Team two	Score
China	South Korea	3–0
Indonesia	Denmark	3–0

==== Final ====
China
3
Beijing, China

Indonesia
0

			1	2	3
1	(China) (Indonesia)	Zhang Jun / Gao Ling; Nova Widianto / Liliyana Natsir	12; 15	15; 5	15; 8
2	(China) (Indonesia)	Lin Dan; Taufik Hidayat	17; 15	15; 9
3	(China) (Indonesia)	Zhang Ning; Fransisca Ratnasari	11; 1	11; 7

2005 Sudirman Cup Champions

China
Fifth title

=== Group 2 ===
==== Subgroup 2A ====
Team one	Team two	Score
Malaysia	Netherlands	3–2
Malaysia	Chinese Taipei	4–1
Malaysia	Russia	5–0
Netherlands	Chinese Taipei	3–2
Netherlands	Russia	4–1
Chinese Taipei	Russia	4–1

==== Subgroup 2B ====
Team one	Team two	Score
Japan	Singapore	3–2
Japan	Germany	4–1
Japan	Ukraine	5–0
Singapore	Germany	3–2
Singapore	Ukraine	5–0
Germany	Ukraine	4–1

==== Playoff ====
Team one	Team two	Score	Notes
Malaysia	Japan	3-1	9th-10th
Singapore	Netherlands	3-0	11th-12th
Germany	Chinese Taipei	3-0	13th-14th
Russia	Ukraine	3-2	15th-16th

=== Group 3 ===
==== Subgroup 3A ====
Team one	Team two	Score
Poland	New Zealand	4–1
Poland	Finland	4–1
Poland	Bulgaria	3–2
New Zealand	Finland	4–1
New Zealand	Bulgaria	4–1
Finland	Bulgaria	3–2

==== Subgroup 3B ====
Team one	Team two	Score
India	United States	4–1
India	Scotland	4–1
India	Wales	4–1
United States	Scotland	3–2
United States	Wales	5–0
Scotland	Wales	4–1

==== Playoff ====
Team one	Team two	Score	Notes
Poland	India	3-1	17th-18th
New Zealand	United States	3-2	19th-20th
Scotland	Finland	3-2	21st-22nd
Bulgaria	Wales	3-2	23rd-24th

=== Group 4 ===
==== Subgroup 4A ====
Team one	Team two	Score
Switzerland	Estonia	3–2
Switzerland	Kazakhstan	3–2
Switzerland	Norway	5–0
Estonia	Kazakhstan	4–1
Estonia	Norway	3–2
Kazakhstan	Norway	3–2

==== Subgroup 4B ====
Team one	Team two	Score
France	Australia	4–1
France	South Africa	5–0
France	Peru	5–0
Australia	South Africa	5–0
Australia	Peru	4–1
South Africa	Peru	4–1

==== Playoff ====
Team one	Team two	Score	Notes
France	Switzerland	3-0	25th-26th
Australia	Estonia	3-0	27th-28th
South Africa	Kazakhstan	3-1	29th-30th
Norway	Peru	3-1	31st-32nd

=== Group 5 ===
==== Subgroup 5A ====
Team one	Team two	Score
Italy	Luxembourg	4–1
Italy	Cyprus	4–1
Luxembourg	Cyprus	4–1

==== Subgroup 5B ====
Team one	Team two	Score
Lithuania	Israel	4–1
Lithuania	Turkey	4–1
Israel	Turkey	4–1

==== Playoff ====
Team one	Team two	Score	Notes
Italy	Lithuania	3-2	33rd-34th
Luxembourg	Israel	3-1	35th-36th
Turkey	Cyprus	3-1	37th-38th

=== Group 6 ===
Team one	Team two	Score
Sri Lanka	Jamaica	4–1
Sri Lanka	Mongolia	5–0
Jamaica	Mongolia	5–0

== Final classification ==
Group 1
Pos	Country
1	China
2	Indonesia
3	Denmark
4	(South Korea) Korea
5	England
6	Hong Kong
7	Thailand
8	Sweden

Group 2
Pos	Country
9	Malaysia
10	Japan
11	Singapore
12	Netherlands
13	Germany
14	Chinese Taipei
15	Russia
16	Ukraine

Group 3
Pos	Country
17	Poland
18	India
19	New Zealand
20	United States
21	Scotland
22	Finland
23	Bulgaria
24	Wales

Group 4
Pos	Country
25	France
26	Switzerland
27	Australia
28	Estonia
29	South Africa
30	Kazakhstan
31	Norway
32	Peru

Group 5
Pos	Country
33	Italy
34	Lithuania
35	Luxembourg
36	Israel
37	Turkey
38	Cyprus

Group 6
Pos	Country
39	Sri Lanka
40	Jamaica
41	Mongolia

Promoted to higher group
Relegated to lower group
