= Badminton at the 2019 Pacific Games =

- Venue: Faleata Sports Complex
- Location: Apia, Samoa
- Dates: 8–13 July 2019

Badminton at the 2019 Pacific Games in Apia, Samoa was held on 8–13 July 2019. The tournament included men's, women's and mixed events, and was played at the Faleata Sports Complex in Tuanaimato. The Northern Marianas badminton team competed at the Pacific Games for the first time in this 2019 tournament.

== Teams ==
The nations competing were:

- Fiji
- Kiribati
- New Caledonia
- Northern Mariana Islands
- Samoa
- Tahiti
- Tonga

== Results ==
=== Mixed Teams ===
Pos	Team	Pld	W	L	MF	MA	MD	GF	GA	GD	PF	PA	PD	Pts	Fiji		French Polynesia	Tonga	Northern Mariana Islands	Samoa	Kiribati
1st place, gold medalist(s)	Fiji	6	5	1	25	5	+20	51	13	+38	1255	836	+419	5	—			5–0	5–0	5–0	5–0
2nd place, silver medalist(s)	New Caledonia	6	5	1	24	6	+18	49	14	+35	1262	867	+395	5	2–3	—		5–0	5–0	5–0	4–1
3rd place, bronze medalist(s)	French Polynesia	6	5	1	23	7	+16	48	16	+32	1253	849	+404	5	3–2		—	4–1	5–0	5–0	4–1
4	Tonga	6	3	3	13	17	−4	27	40	−13	1084	1258	−174	3				—	4–1		3–2
5	Northern Mariana Islands	6	2	4	8	22	−14	18	45	−27	861	1246	−385	2					—		
6	Samoa	6	1	5	4	26	−22	11	52	−41	820	1246	−426	1				0–5	1–4	—	3–2
7	Kiribati	6	0	6	8	22	−14	21	45	−24	1007	1240	−233	0					2–3		—

Source: BWF
Rules for classification: Tiebreakers

== Medal summary ==
=== Medal table ===
Rank	Nation	Gold	Silver	Bronze	Total
1	Tahiti (TAH)	3	2	3	8
2	New Caledonia (NCL)	2	2	2	6
3	Fiji (FIJ)	1	2	1	4
Totals (3 entries)		6	6	6	18

=== Medalists ===
Event	Gold	Silver	Bronze
Men's singles	Rémi Rossi; Tahiti	Yohan de Geoffroy; New Caledonia	Louis Beaubois; Tahiti
Women's singles	Dgeniva Matauli; New Caledonia	Coralie Bouttin; Tahiti	Danielle Whiteside; Fiji
Men's doubles	Rauhiri Goguenheim and Rémi Rossi (TAH)	Quentin Bernaix and Tarepa Bourgery (TAH)	Ronan Ho-Yagues and Morgan Paitio (NCL)
Women's doubles	Johanna Kou and Dgeniva Matauli (NCL)	Karyn Gibson and Andra Whiteside (FIJ)	Coralie Bouttin and Esther Tau (TAH)
Mixed doubles	Rémi Rossi and Coralie Bouttin (TAH)	Burty Molia and Karyn Gibson (FIJ)	Morgan Paitio and Johanna Kou (NCL)
Mixed team	Fiji; Ahmad Ali; Alissa Dean; Martin Feussner; Karyn Gibson; Liam Fong; Ryan Fong; Burty Molia; Andra Whiteside; Danielle Whiteside; Ashley Yee	New Caledonia; Yohan de Geoffroy; Ronan Ho-Yagues; Soizick Ho-Yagues; Johanna Kou; Dgenyva Matauli; Cecilia Moussy; Bryan Nicole; Morgan Paitio; Melissa Sanmoestanom	Tahiti; Ingrid Ateni; Louis Beaubois; Quentin Bernaix; Tarepa Bourgery; Coralie Bouttin; Heinamu Frogier; Rauhiri Goguenheim; Manuarii Ly; Hinhere Mara; Melissa Mi You; Rémi Rossi; Esther Tau
