= Badminton Oceania =

Badminton association

- Abbreviation: BOC
- Type: Sports federation
- Headquarters: Ellerslie, Auckland, New Zealand
- Members: 18 member associations
- Secretary General: (New Zealand) Julie Carrel
- President: (Australia) Loke Poh Wong
- Website: http://www.badmintonoceania.org/

Former logo under the ex-organisation name

Badminton Oceania (BOC) is the governing body of badminton in Oceania. It is one of the 5 continental bodies under the flag of the Badminton World Federation (BWF). The confederation has 18 member countries. Vanuatu is the newest member, which was granted membership in 2025.

On the occasion of launching the new logo by Badminton Oceania, the organisation decided to change the name from Oceania Badminton Confederation to Badminton Oceania.

== Presidents ==
Name	Country	Term
Heather Robson	New Zealand	1987-2001
Don Stockins	Australia	2001-2005
Robin Bryant	Australia	2005-2007
Nigel Skelt	New Zealand	2008-2011
Geraldine Brown	Australia	2012-2022
Loke Poh Wong	Australia	2022-2026

== Member associations ==
1. Australia
2. Cook Islands
3. Fiji
4. Guam
5. Kiribati
6. Nauru
7. New Zealand
8. Norfolk Island
9. Papua New Guinea
10. Samoa
11. Solomon Islands
12. (French Polynesia) Tahiti
13. Tonga
14. Tuvalu
15. Vanuatu
16. New Caledonia (associated member)
17. (Northern Mariana Islands) Northern Mariana (associated member)
18. Wallis and Futuna (associated member)

== Tournament ==
- Oceania Badminton Championships
- Oceania Junior Badminton Championships
- Oceania Para Badminton Championships
