= 2004 Oceania Badminton Championships =

Tournament details
- Dates: 20 – 25 April
- Nations: 5
- Venue: Waitakere Badminton Centre
- Location: Waitakere City, New Zealand

Champions
- Men's singles: (Australia) Leonard Tjoe
- Women's singles: (Australia) Lenny Permana
- Men's doubles: (New Zealand) John Gordon (New Zealand) Daniel Shirley
- Women's doubles: (New Zealand) Nicole Gordon (New Zealand) Sara Runesten-Petersen
- Mixed doubles: (New Zealand) Daniel Shirley (New Zealand) Sara Runesten-Petersen

The 2004 Oceania Badminton Championships was the fourth edition of the Oceania Badminton Championships. The tournament was held from 20 to 25 April at the Waitakere Badminton Centre in Waitakere City, New Zealand. Five nations competed in the championships.

== Medal summary ==
=== Medalists ===
Event	Gold	Silver	Bronze
Men's singles	(Australia) Leonard Tjoe	(New Zealand) Geoff Bellingham	(Australia) Stuart Brehaut
Men's singles	(Australia) Leonard Tjoe	(New Zealand) Geoff Bellingham	(New Zealand) John Moody
Women's singles	(Australia) Lenny Permana	(New Zealand) Rebecca Gordon	(Australia) Kellie Lucas
Women's singles	(Australia) Lenny Permana	(New Zealand) Rebecca Gordon	(New Zealand) Rachel Hindley
Men's doubles	(New Zealand) John Gordon (New Zealand) Daniel Shirley	(New Zealand) Geoff Bellingham (New Zealand) Craig Cooper	(Australia) Stuart Brehaut (Australia) Travis Denney
Men's doubles	(New Zealand) John Gordon (New Zealand) Daniel Shirley	(New Zealand) Geoff Bellingham (New Zealand) Craig Cooper	(Australia) Boyd Cooper (Australia) Hung Pham
Women's doubles	(New Zealand) Nicole Gordon (New Zealand) Sara Runesten-Petersen	(Australia) Jane Crabtree (Australia) Kate Wilson-Smith	(Australia) Kellie Lucas (Australia) Tania Luiz
Women's doubles	(New Zealand) Nicole Gordon (New Zealand) Sara Runesten-Petersen	(Australia) Jane Crabtree (Australia) Kate Wilson-Smith	(New Zealand) Donna Cranston (New Zealand) Kimberly Windsor
Mixed doubles	(New Zealand) Daniel Shirley (New Zealand) Sara Runesten-Petersen	(Australia) Travis Denney (Australia) Kate Wilson-Smith	(Australia) Stuart Brehaut (Australia) Tania Luiz
Mixed doubles	(New Zealand) Daniel Shirley (New Zealand) Sara Runesten-Petersen	(Australia) Travis Denney (Australia) Kate Wilson-Smith	(Australia) Boyd Cooper (Australia) Kellie Lucas
Mixed team	New Zealand	Australia	New Caledonia

=== Medal table ===
* Host nation (New Zealand)

Rank	Nation	Gold	Silver	Bronze	Total
1	New Zealand*	4	3	3	10
2	Australia	2	3	7	12
3	New Caledonia	0	0	1	1
Totals (3 entries)		6	6	11	23

== Individual results ==
=== Men's singles ===
Semi-finals
(Australia) Stuart Brehaut	10	9
(New Zealand) Geoff Bellingham	15	15
(Australia) Leonard Tjoe	15	17
(New Zealand) John Moody	13	15

Final
(New Zealand) Geoff Bellingham	10	9
(Australia) Leonard Tjoe	15	15

=== Women's singles ===
Semi-finals
(Australia) Lenny Permana	11	11
(New Zealand) Rachel Hindley	7	5
(New Zealand) Rebecca Gordon	7	13	11
(Australia) Kellie Lucas	11	11	0

Final
(Australia) Lenny Permana	11	11
(New Zealand) Rebecca Gordon	5	8

=== Men's doubles ===
Semi-finals
(Australia) Ashley Brehaut (Australia) Travis Denney	4	13
(New Zealand) Geoff Bellingham (New Zealand) Craig Cooper	15	15
(Australia) Boyd Cooper (Australia) Hung Pham	10	11
(New Zealand) John Gordon (New Zealand) Daniel Shirley	15	15

Final
(New Zealand) Geoff Bellingham (New Zealand) Craig Cooper	11	15
(New Zealand) John Gordon (New Zealand) Daniel Shirley	15	17

=== Women's doubles ===
Semi-finals
(Australia) Jane Crabtree (Australia) Kate Wilson-Smith	15	15
(New Zealand) Donna Cranston (New Zealand) Kimberly Windsor	8	7
(New Zealand) Nicole Gordon (New Zealand) Sara Runesten-Petersen	15	15
(Australia) Kellie Lucas (Australia) Tania Luiz	6	5

Final
(Australia) Jane Crabtree (Australia) Kate Wilson-Smith	15	9	10
(New Zealand) Nicole Gordon (New Zealand) Sara Runesten-Petersen	7	15	15

=== Mixed doubles ===
Semi-finals
(Australia) Travis Denney (Australia) Kate Wilson-Smith	15	15
(Australia) Boyd Cooper (Australia) Kellie Lucas	10	12
(Australia) Stuart Brehaut (Australia) Tania Luiz	1	1
(New Zealand) Daniel Shirley (New Zealand) Sara Runesten-Petersen	15	15

Final
(Australia) Travis Denney (Australia) Kate Wilson-Smith	2	10
(New Zealand) Daniel Shirley (New Zealand) Sara Runesten-Petersen	15	15

== Team event ==
=== Standings ===
Pos	Team	Pld	Pts
1	New Zealand (H)	3	3
2	Australia	3	2
3	New Caledonia	3	1
4	Samoa	3	0

Source: Badminton Oceania
(H) Host

=== New Zealand vs Samoa ===
New Zealand
5
Waitakere Badminton Centre
20 April 2004

Samoa
0

			1	2	3
1	(New Zealand) (Samoa)	John Moody; Burty Molia	15; 5	15; 0
2	(New Zealand) (Samoa)	Rachel Hindley; Phyllis Gordon	11; 3	11; 1
3	(New Zealand) (Samoa)	John Gordon / Daniel Shirley; Itagia Tupuivao / Vaiola Vaeau	15; 1	15; 0
4	(New Zealand) (Samoa)	Daniel Shirley / Sara Runesten-Petersen; Burty Molia / Nelly Gordon	15; 0	15; 2
5	(New Zealand) (Samoa)	Nicole Gordon / Sara Runesten-Petersen; Moe Kontze / Vicki Bailey	15; 0	15; 2

=== Australia vs New Caledonia ===
Australia
5
Waitakere Badminton Centre
20 April 2004

New Caledonia
0

			1	2	3
1	(Australia) (New Caledonia)	Hung Pham; Sebastian Arias	15; 1	15; 0
2	(Australia) (New Caledonia)	Lenny Permana; Johanna Kou	11; 1	11; 4
3	(Australia) (New Caledonia)	Stuart Brehaut / Hung Pham; Florent Mathey / Florian Paladini	15; 2	15; 1
4	(Australia) (New Caledonia)	Kellie Lucas / Tania Luiz; Johanna Kou / Bellenka Delmas	15; 11	15; 1
5	(Australia) (New Caledonia)	Travis Denney / Kate Wilson-Smith; Thommy Sargito / Cécile Sarengat	15; 0	15; 0

=== New Zealand vs New Caledonia ===
New Zealand
5
Waitakere Badminton Centre
21 April 2004

New Caledonia
0

			1	2	3
1	(New Zealand) (New Caledonia)	Geoff Bellingham; Thommy Sargito	15; 4	15; 7
2	(New Zealand) (New Caledonia)	Rachel Hindley; Bellenka Delmas	11; 3	11; 0
3	(New Zealand) (New Caledonia)	Geoff Bellingham / Craig Cooper; Arnaud Franzi / Julien Sarengat	15; 1	15; 4
4	(New Zealand) (New Caledonia)	Rachel Hindley / Lianne Shirley; Bellenka Delmas / Cécile Sarengat	15; 2	15; 4
5	(New Zealand) (New Caledonia)	Craig Cooper / Lianne Shirley; Sebastian Arias / Bellenka Delmas	15; 5	15; 1

=== Australia vs Samoa ===
Australia
5
Waitakere Badminton Centre
21 April 2004

Samoa
0

			1	2	3
1	(Australia) (Samoa)	Leonard Tjoe; Burty Molia	15; 1	15; 1
2	(Australia) (Samoa)	Lenny Permana; Phyllis Gordon	11; 0	11; 1
3	(Australia) (Samoa)	Stuart Brehaut / Hung Pham; Itagia Tupuivao / Vaiola Vaeau	15; 2	15; 0
4	(Australia) (Samoa)	Kellie Lucas / Tania Luiz; Vicki Bailey / Moe Kontze	15; 1	15; 0
5	(Australia) (Samoa)	Travis Denney / Kate Wilson-Smith; Burty Molia / Nelly Gordon	15; 3	15; 1

=== New Caledonia vs Samoa ===
New Caledonia
3
Waitakere Badminton Centre
22 April 2004

Samoa
2

			1	2	3
1	(New Caledonia) (Samoa)	Florent Mathey; Burty Molia	11; 15	15; 6	6; 15
2	(New Caledonia) (Samoa)	Julien Sarengat / Thommy Sargito; Itagia Tupuivao / Vaiola Vaeau	15; 1	3; 15	15; 3
3	(New Caledonia) (Samoa)	Bellenka Delmas; Phyllis Gordon	4; 11	13; 11	6; 11
4	(New Caledonia) (Samoa)	Johanna Kou / Cécile Sarengat; Vicki Bailey / Moe Kontze	15; 9	15; 2
5	(New Caledonia) (Samoa)	Fabien Kaddour / Johanna Kou; N. N. Wu / Nelly Gordon	15; 3	15; 1

=== Australia vs New Zealand ===
Australia
1
Waitakere Badminton Centre
22 April 2004

New Zealand
4

			1	2	3
1	(Australia) (New Zealand)	Leonard Tjoe; Geoff Bellingham	15; 12	17; 14
2	(Australia) (New Zealand)	Ashley Brehaut / Travis Denney; John Gordon / Daniel Shirley	15; 10	6; 15	10; 15
3	(Australia) (New Zealand)	Lenny Permana; Rachel Hindley	3; 11	2; 11
4	(Australia) (New Zealand)	Jane Crabtree / Kate Wilson-Smith; Nicole Gordon / Sara Runesten-Petersen	8; 15	9; 15
5	(Australia) (New Zealand)	Travis Denney / Kate Wilson-Smith; Daniel Shirley / Sara Runesten-Petersen	2; 15	5; 15
