= 2010 Oceania Badminton Championships =

Tournament details
- Dates: 24–27 February 2010
- Venue: Stadium Southland
- Location: Invercargill, New Zealand

The VII 2010 Oceania Badminton Championships was the 7th tournament of the Oceania Badminton Championships. It was held in Invercargill, New Zealand from 24 to 27 February 2010.

== Venue ==
The tournament was held at Stadium Southland in Invercargill, New Zealand.

== Medalists ==
=== Individual event ===
The table below gives an overview of the individual event medal winners at the 2010 Oceania Championships.

Event	Gold	Silver	Bronze
Men's singles	(New Zealand) Joe Wu	(New Zealand) James Eunson	(New Zealand) Michael Fowke
Men's singles	(New Zealand) Joe Wu	(New Zealand) James Eunson	(New Caledonia) Marc Antoine Desaymoz
Women's singles	(Australia) Huang Chia-Chi	(Australia) Erica Pong	(New Zealand) Jessica Jonggowisastro
Women's singles	(Australia) Huang Chia-Chi	(Australia) Erica Pong	(Australia) Leanne Choo
Men's doubles	(Australia) Ross Smith and Glenn Warfe	(New Zealand) Oliver Leydon-Davis and Henry Tam	(New Zealand) James Paterson and Brent Miller
Men's doubles	(Australia) Ross Smith and Glenn Warfe	(New Zealand) Oliver Leydon-Davis and Henry Tam	(Australia) Saliya Gunaratne and Chad Whitehead
Women's doubles	(Australia) Leanne Choo and Kate Wilson-Smith	(Australia) Leisha Cooper and Ann-Louise Slee	(New Zealand) Danielle Barry and Donna Haliday
Women's doubles	(Australia) Leanne Choo and Kate Wilson-Smith	(Australia) Leisha Cooper and Ann-Louise Slee	(New Zealand) Stephanie Cheng and Victoria Cheng
Mixed doubles	(Australia) Glenn Warfe and Kate Wilson-Smith	(New Zealand) Henry Tam and Donna Haliday	(New Zealand) James Eunson and Stephanie Cheng
Mixed doubles	(Australia) Glenn Warfe and Kate Wilson-Smith	(New Zealand) Henry Tam and Donna Haliday	(Australia) Chad Whitehead and Leanne Choo

=== Team Event ===
Event	Gold	Silver	Bronze
Mixed team	Australia; Stuart Brehaut, Stuart Gomez, Ross Smith, Jeff Tho, Raj Veeran, Glenn Warfe, Chad Whitehead; Leanne Choo, Huang Chia-Chi, Erica Pong, Eugenia Tanaka, Tang He Tian, Renuga Veeran, Kate Wilson-Smith	New Zealand; Kevin Dennerly-Minturn, James Eunson, Oliver Leydon-Davis, Henry Tam, Joe Wu; Danielle Barry, Michelle Chan, Donna Haliday, Jessica Jonggowisastro, Anna Rankin	Fiji; Norman Bentley, Shivneil Chand, Gee Ming Fong, Burty Molia, Aaron Wong, Chi Ying Wong; Carline Bentley, Andra Whiteside, Danielle Whiteside, Gabriella Wong
Men's team	Australia; Stuart Brehaut, Stuart Gomez, Ross Smith, Jeff Tho, Raj Veeran, Ben Walklate, Glenn Warfe, Chad Whitehead	New Zealand; Kevin Dennerly-Minturn, James Eunson, Oliver Leydon-Davis, Henry Tam, Joe Wu	New Caledonia; Sebastien Arias, Marc Antoine Desaymoz, Florian Ferrer, Glenn Gowet, Fabien Kaddour
Women's team	Australia; Leanne Choo, Huang Chia-Chi, Erica Pong, Eugenia Tanaka, He Tian Tang, Renuga Veeran, Kate Wilson-Smith	New Zealand; Danielle Barry, Michelle Chan Ky, Donna Haliday, Jessica Jonggowisastro, Anna Rankin	New Caledonia; Cecile Kaddour, Johanna Kou, Natacha Offlavilee, Melissa Sanmoestanom, Valerie Sarengat
