= 2024 in badminton =

This article lists the badminton events for 2024.

- 2024 BWF Tour Calendar here.

== 2024 BWF season ==
see 2024 BWF season

== International Championships ==
- February 12–15: 2024 All Africa Men's and Women's Team Badminton Championships in Cairo
  - Men's: (gold) Algeria; (silver) Nigeria; (bronze) Egypt; (bronze) Mauritius
  - Women's: (gold) South Africa; (silver) Uganda; (bronze) Algeria; (bronze) Nigeria
- February 12–15: 2024 Oceania Badminton Championships in (Australia) Geelong
  - Singles winners: (New Zealand) Edward Lau (m) / (Australia) Tiffany Ho (f)
  - Doubles winners: (Australia) Lukas Defolky & Tang Huaidong (m) / (Australia) Setyana Mapasa & Angela Yu (f)
  - Mixed Doubles winners: (Australia) Kenneth Choo & Gronya Somerville
- February 13–18: 2024 Badminton Asia Team Championships in Shah Alam
  - Men's: (gold) China; (silver) Malaysia; (bronze) Japan; (bronze) South Korea
  - Women's: (gold) India; (silver) Thailand; (bronze) Indonesia; (bronze) Japan
- February 14–18: 2024 European Men's and Women's Team Badminton Championships in (Poland) Łódź
  - Men's: (gold) Denmark; (silver) France; (bronze) England; (bronze) Germany
  - Women's: (gold) Denmark; (silver) Spain; (bronze) France; (bronze) Scotland
- February 15–18: 2024 Pan Am Male & Female Badminton Cup in São Paulo
  - Men's: (gold) Canada; (silver) Brazil; (bronze) Mexico
  - Women's: (gold) Canada; (silver) United States; (bronze) Brazil
- February 16–18: 2024 All Africa Individual Championships in (Egypt) Cairo
  - Singles winners: (Nigeria) Anuoluwapo Juwon Opeyori (m) / (Mauritius) Kate Foo Kune (f)
  - Doubles winners: (Algeria) Koceila Mammeri & Youcef Sabri Medel (m) / (South Africa) Amy Ackerman & Deidre Laurens (f)
  - Mixed Doubles winners: (Algeria) Koceila Mammeri & Tanina Violette Mammeri
- February 16–18: 2024 Oceania Men's and Women's Team Badminton Championships in Geelong
  - Men's team: (gold) Australia; (silver) New Zealand; (bronze) French Polynesia
  - Women's team: (gold) Australia; (silver) New Zealand; (bronze) French Polynesia
