= 2016 New Zealand Open Grand Prix Gold =

Tournament details
- Dates: 22–27 March
- Level: Grand Prix Gold
- Total prize money: US$120,000
- Venue: North Shore Events Centre
- Location: Auckland, New Zealand

Champions
- Men's singles: (China) Huang Yuxiang
- Women's singles: (South Korea) Sung Ji-hyun
- Men's doubles: (South Korea) Ko Sung-hyun (South Korea) Shin Baek-cheol
- Women's doubles: (Japan) Yuki Fukushima (Japan) Sayaka Hirota
- Mixed doubles: (Malaysia) Chan Peng Soon (Malaysia) Goh Liu Ying

The 2016 New Zealand Open Grand Prix Gold was the sixth Grand Prix's badminton tournament of the 2016 BWF Grand Prix and Grand Prix Gold. The tournament was held at the North Shore Events Centre in Auckland, New Zealand on 22–27 March 2016 and had a total purse of $120,000.

== Men's singles ==
=== Seeds ===
1. (South Korea) Son Wan-Ho (quarterfinals)
2. (India) Ajay Jayaram (withdrawn)
3. (South Korea) Lee Dong-keun (quarterfinals)
4. (Chinese Taipei) Hsu Jen-Hao (third round)
5. (Indonesia) Ihsan Maulana Mustofa (third round)
6. (Indonesia) Anthony Sinisuka Ginting (third round)
7. (Indonesia) Jonatan Christie (third round)
8. (Malaysia) Zulfadli Zulkiffli (withdrawn)
9. (Vietnam) Nguyen Tien Minh (semifinals)
10. (Malaysia) Goh Soon Huat (third round)
11. (Singapore) Derek Wong Zi Liang (second round)
12. (China) Qiao Bin (quarterfinals)
13. (China) Huang Yuxiang (champion)
14. (Chinese Taipei) Wang Tzu-Wei (withdrawn)
15. (Japan) Kazumasa Sakai (second round)
16. (Malaysia) Soo Teck Zhi (semifinals)

=== Finals ===
Quarterfinals
1	(South Korea) Son Wan-Ho	19	19
13	(China) Huang Yuxiang	21	21
16	(Malaysia) Soo Teck Zhi	11	22	21
(China) Shi Yuqi	21	20	14
(Japan) Riichi Takeshita	21	17	21
3	(South Korea) Lee Dong-keun	16	21	8
12	(China) Qiao Bin	21	17	14
9	(Vietnam) Nguyen Tien Minh	17	21	21

Semifinals
13	(China) Huang Yuxiang	21	21
16	(Malaysia) Soo Teck Zhi	18	17
(Japan) Riichi Takeshita	21	21
9	(Vietnam) Nguyen Tien Minh	15	17

Final
13	(China) Huang Yuxiang	21	21
(Japan) Riichi Takeshita	12	17

=== Top half ===
==== Section 1 ====
First Round
1	(South Korea) Son W-h	21	21
(New Zealand) X Yang	5	3
(Chinese Taipei) Liu W-c	17	13
(Malaysia) Liew DR	21	21
11	(Singapore) Derek Wong Z L	21	21
(Australia) S Kumar	5	6
(New Zealand) C Harfield	5	7
(Israel) M Zilberman	21	21

Second Round
1	(South Korea) Son W-h	21	21
(Malaysia) Liew DR	14	17
11	(Singapore) Derek Wong Z L	16	21	6^{r}
(Israel) M Zilberman	21	18	13

Third Round
1	(South Korea) Son W-h	21	21
(Israel) M Zilberman	12	8

==== Section 2 ====
First Round
PFQ	(New Zealand) E Lau
Q2	BYE
Q3	(New Zealand) J Boyle	5	2
(China) Lin GP	21	21
13	(China) Huang YX	21	21
Q4	(New Zealand) C Pang	10	7
(New Zealand) A Manota	21	21
(Indonesia) N E Sulistyo	9	18

Second Round
PFQ	(New Zealand) E Lau	14	11
(China) Lin GP	21	21
13	(China) Huang YX	22	21
(New Zealand) A Manota	20	11

Third Round
(China) Lin GP	14	12
13	(China) Huang YX	21	21

==== Section 3 ====
First Round
4	(Chinese Taipei) Hsu J-h	21	21
(Brunei) J Woon	13	12
(New Zealand) M Hu He	7	12
(Indonesia) K H Wibowo	21	21
16	(Malaysia) Soo T Z
Q5	BYE
(Australia) P S Low	21	22
(New Zealand) J Curtin	18	20

Second Round
4	(Chinese Taipei) Hsu J-h	19	21	21
(Indonesia) K H Wibowo	21	16	19
16	(Malaysia) Soo T Z	21	21
(Australia) P S Low	8	6

Third Round
4	(Chinese Taipei) Hsu J-h	17	10
16	(Malaysia) Soo T Z	21	21

==== Section 4 ====
First Round
5	(Indonesia) I M Mustofa	w	/	o
(Malaysia) Zh Zulkiffli
(Chinese Taipei) Shih K-c	21	21
(New Zealand) O Guo	11	13
15	(Japan) K Sakai	21	21
PFQ	(New Zealand) D Vong	5	4
(Chinese Taipei) Lin C-h	18	9
(China) Shi YQ	21	21

Second Round
5	(Indonesia) I M Mustofa	21	21
(Chinese Taipei) Shih K-c	18	16
15	(Japan) K Sakai	20	14
(China) Shi YQ	22	21

Third Round
5	(Indonesia) I M Mustofa	19	16
(China) Shi YQ	21	21

=== Bottom half ===
==== Section 5 ====
First Round
(Japan) R Takeshita	21	21
(Australia) A Joe	13	12
PFQ	(Australia) H Tang	w	/	o
14	(Chinese Taipei) Wang T-w
(Australia) C Chen	6	9
(Chinese Taipei) Lin Y-h	21	21
(Chinese Taipei) Kuo C-h	17	14
6	(Indonesia) A S Ginting	21	21

Second Round
(Japan) R Takeshita	21	21
PFQ	(Australia) H Tang	10	14
(Chinese Taipei) Lin Y-h	14	9
6	(Indonesia) A S Ginting	21	21

Third Round
(Japan) R Takeshita	12	21	21
6	(Indonesia) A S Ginting	21	15	16

==== Section 6 ====
First Round
(New Zealand) D Vong	9	9
(Chinese Taipei) Chi Y-j	21	21
(New Zealand) A Rouse	4	8
10	(Malaysia) Goh S H	21	21
Q6	BYE
(Australia) N Tang
(Australia) A Gobinathan	5	13
3	(South Korea) Lee D-k	21	21

Second Round
(Chinese Taipei) Chi Y-j	17	18
10	(Malaysia) Goh S H	21	21
(Australia) N Tang	6	9
3	(South Korea) Lee D-k	21	21

Third Round
10	(Malaysia) Goh S H	16	15
3	(South Korea) Lee D-k	21	21

==== Section 7 ====
First Round
Q7	(New Zealand) K Zhang	22	21
(New Zealand) J Curry	20	11
(New Zealand) D Soedjasa	4	13
12	(China) Qiao B	21	21
(Philippines) M S Alcala	21	21
(New Zealand) N Tagle	14	14
Q1	(Sweden) N Borg-Sigg	4	5
7	(Indonesia) J Christie	21	21

Second Round
Q7	(New Zealand) K Zhang	7	5
12	(China) Qiao B	21	21
(Philippines) M S Alcala	7	11
7	(Indonesia) J Christie	21	21

Third Round
12	(China) Qiao B	22	21	21
7	(Indonesia) J Christie	24	15	15

==== Section 8 ====
First Round
Q8	BYE
(New Zealand) V Tong
(New Zealand) C F Lim	8	5
9	(Vietnam) Nguyen T M	21	21
(Indonesia) F I Hadmadi	w	/	o
(New Zealand) C Steeghs
(Australia) J Sun	21	21
PFQ	(New Zealand) K Y Lim	6	10

Second Round
(New Zealand) V Tong	1	4
9	(Vietnam) Nguyen T M	21	21
(Indonesia) F I Hadmadi	21	21
(Australia) J Sun	14	8

Third Round
9	(Vietnam) Nguyen T M	21	21
(Indonesia) F I Hadmadi	13	12

== Women's singles ==
=== Seeds ===
1. (South Korea) Sung Ji-Hyun (champion)
2. (Japan) Yui Hashimoto (second round)
3. (South Korea) Bae Yeon-ju (semifinals)
4. (Indonesia) Lindaweni Fanetri (second round)
5. (Chinese Taipei) Hsu Ya-ching (quarterfinals)
6. (United States) Iris Wang (second round)
7. (United States) Rong Schafer (second round)
8. (Japan) Kaori Imabeppu (quarterfinals)

=== Finals ===
Semifinals
1	(South Korea) Sung Ji-hyun	21	21
(Chinese Taipei) Chiang Mei-hui	13	8
3	(South Korea) Bae Yeon-ju	16	17
(Japan) Aya Ohori	21	21

Final
1	(South Korea) Sung Ji-hyun	21	21
(Japan) Aya Ohori	15	17

=== Top half ===
==== Section 1 ====
First Round
1	(South Korea) Sung J-h	21	21
PFQ	(New Zealand) S Fu	6	7
(China) Gao FJ	21	21
Q2	(New Zealand) K Stern	4	5
6	(United States) I Wang	21	21
Q1	(Chinese Taipei) Cheng Y-c	4	16
(China) Chen YF	21	21
(Australia) J Lai	9	8

Second Round
1	(South Korea) Sung J-h	21	21
(China) Gao FJ	15	16
6	(United States) I Wang	14	21	18
(China) Chen YF	21	18	21

Quarterfinals
1	(South Korea) Sung J-h	21	21	21
(China) Chen YF	23	14	14

==== Section 2 ====
First Round
4	(Indonesia) L Fanetri	21	21
(Finland) A Mikkela	7	6
(Japan) C Hoshi	15	21	18
(Chinese Taipei) Chiang M-h	21	14	21
8	(Japan) K Imabeppu	21	21
PFQ	(Sri Lanka) A Ratnasiri	15	17
(Japan) S Kawakami	21	21
(Australia) J Tam	13	10

Second Round
4	(Indonesia) L Fanetri	18	21	15
(Chinese Taipei) Chiang M-h	21	15	21
8	(Japan) K Imabeppu	21	21
(Japan) S Kawakami	15	16

Quarterfinals
(Chinese Taipei) Chiang M-h	21	21
8	(Japan) K Imabeppu	17	16

=== Bottom half ===
==== Section 3 ====
First Round
(Russia) K Polikarpova	21	21
(Australia) M Sun	13	17
PFQ	(Australia) T Ho	8	6
7	(United States) R Schafer	21	21
Q4	(New Zealand) V Copeland	10	3
(Vietnam) Vu T T	21	21
PFQ	(New Zealand) C Zhang	13	7
3	(South Korea) Bae Y-j	21	21

Second Round
(Russia) K Polikarpova	20	21	21
7	(United States) R Schafer	22	18	17
(Vietnam) Vu T T	14	12
3	(South Korea) Bae Y-j	21	21

Quarterfinals
(Russia) K Polikarpova	6	12
3	(South Korea) Bae Y-j	21	21

==== Section 4 ====
First Round
(Singapore) Liang XY	21	21
Q3	(New Zealand) S Wu	3	7
(China) Hui XR	21	15	19
5	(Chinese Taipei) Hsu Y-c	13	21	21
(Japan) A Ohori	21	21
(Australia) Wendy Chen H-y	15	14
(Chinese Taipei) Cheng C-y	13	9
2	(Japan) Y Hashimoto	21	21

Second Round
(Singapore) Liang XY	18	13
5	(Chinese Taipei) Hsu Y-c	21	21
(Japan) A Ohori	21	22
2	(Japan) Y Hashimoto	17	20

Quarterfinals
5	(Chinese Taipei) Hsu Y-c	15	17
(Japan) A Ohori	21	21

== Men's doubles ==
=== Seeds ===
1. (South Korea) Kim Gi-jung / Kim Sa-rang (quarterfinals)
2. (South Korea) Ko Sung-hyun / Shin Baek-cheol (champion)
3. (Indonesia) Angga Pratama / Ricky Karanda Suwardi (final)
4. (Indonesia) Markus Fernaldi Gideon / Kevin Sanjaya Sukamuljo (semifinals)
5. (Malaysia) Goh V Shem / Tan Wee Kiong (withdrawn)
6. (India) Manu Attri / B. Sumeeth Reddy (quarterfinals)
7. (Chinese Taipei) Chen Hung-ling / Wang Chi-lin (quarterfinals)
8. (China) Huang Kaixiang / Zheng Siwei (semifinals)

=== Finals ===
Semifinals
8	(China) Huang Kaixiang (China) Zheng Siwei	19	22
3	(Indonesia) Angga Pratama (Indonesia) Ricky Karanda Suwardi	21	24
4	(Indonesia) Markus Fernaldi Gideon (Indonesia) Kevin Sanjaya Sukamuljo	16	16
2	(South Korea) Ko Sung-hyun (South Korea) Shin Baek-cheol	21	21

Final
3	(Indonesia) Angga Pratama (Indonesia) Ricky Karanda Suwardi	18	14
2	(South Korea) Ko Sung-hyun (South Korea) Shin Baek-cheol	21	21

=== Top half ===
==== Section 1 ====
First Round
1	(South Korea) Kim G-j (South Korea) Kim S-r	21	21
(New Zealand) O Leydon-Davis (New Zealand) N Tagle	6	10
(Chinese Taipei) Liao K-h (Chinese Taipei) Lu C-p	17	22	19
(Australia) M Chau (Australia) S Serasinghe	21	20	21
8	(China) Huang KX (China) Zheng SW	21	17	21
(Philippines) C A Cayanan (Philippines) P J Escueta	13	21	10
PFQ	(China) He JT (China) Tan Q	21	21
Q3	(Vietnam) Bao M (Vietnam) Duong B D	9	15

Second Round
1	(South Korea) Kim G-j (South Korea) Kim S-r	21	21
(Australia) M Chau (Australia) S Serasinghe	10	17
8	(China) Huang KX (China) Zheng SW	19	21	21
PFQ	(China) He JT (China) Tan Q	21	10	15

Quarterfinals
1	(South Korea) Kim G-j (South Korea) Kim S-r	21	19	16
8	(China) Huang KX (China) Zheng SW	17	21	21

==== Section 2 ====
First Round
3	(Indonesia) A Pratama (Indonesia) R K Suwardi	21	13	21
(Japan) T Inoue (Japan) Y Kaneko	19	21	19
(Japan) T Hoki (Japan) Y Kobayashi	21	22
Q1	(Philippines) P G Magnaye (Philippines) A Morada	17	20
7	(Chinese Taipei) Chen H-l (Chinese Taipei) Wang C-l	21	21
Q4	(Chinese Taipei) Liu W-c (Chinese Taipei) Shih K-c	5	6
PFQ	(New Zealand) J Curry (New Zealand) M H He	11	7
(India) P J Chopra (India) A Dewalkar	21	21

Second Round
3	(Indonesia) A Pratama (Indonesia) R K Suwardi	11	21	21
(Japan) T Hoki (Japan) Y Kobayashi	21	16	12
7	(Chinese Taipei) Chen H-l (Chinese Taipei) Wang C-l	21	21
(India) P J Chopra (India) A Dewalkar	14	17

Quarterfinals
3	(Indonesia) A Pratama (Indonesia) R K Suwardi	23	21
7	(Chinese Taipei) Chen H-l (Chinese Taipei) Wang C-l	21	17

=== Bottom half ===
==== Section 3 ====
First Round
(Chinese Taipei) Liu W-c (Chinese Taipei) Yang P-h	21	21
(Australia) J Sun (Australia) H Tang	12	6
(Australia) A Joe (Australia) P S Low	14	18
PFQ	(New Zealand) A Manota (New Zealand) D Soedjasa	21	21
(Japan) H Saeki (Japan) R Taohata	21	21
(Chinese Taipei) Chang K-c (Chinese Taipei) Lee C-h	17	14
(New Zealand) J Curtin (New Zealand) D Oud	12	13
4	(Indonesia) M F Gideon (Indonesia) K S Sukamuljo	21	21

Second Round
(Chinese Taipei) Liu W-c (Chinese Taipei) Yang P-h	21	21
PFQ	(New Zealand) A Manota (New Zealand) D Soedjasa	9	7
(Japan) H Saeki (Japan) R Taohata	12	19
4	(Indonesia) M F Gideon (Indonesia) K S Sukamuljo	21	21

Quarterfinals
(Chinese Taipei) Liu W-c (Chinese Taipei) Yang P-h	16	21	14
4	(Indonesia) M F Gideon (Indonesia) K S Sukamuljo	21	19	21

==== Section 4 ====
First Round
(Chinese Taipei) Lee J-h (Chinese Taipei) Lee Y	21	16	19
(Philippines) R Estanislao (Philippines) P J Vivas	16	21	21
(Chinese Taipei) Lin S-k (Chinese Taipei) Lu C-y	11	21	16
6	(India) M Attri (India) B S Reddy	21	17	21
Q2	(Chinese Taipei) Su C-h (Chinese Taipei) Yang P-h	21	16	17
(Indonesia) F Alfian (Indonesia) R Ardianto	18	21	21
PFQ	(China) Han CK (China) Zhou HD	19	21	17
2	(South Korea) Ko S-h (South Korea) Shin B-c	21	18	21

Second Round
(Philippines) R Estanislao (Philippines) P J Vivas	15	16
6	(India) M Attri (India) B S Reddy	21	21
(Indonesia) F Alfian (Indonesia) M R Ardianto	13	8
2	(South Korea) Ko S-h (South Korea) Shin B-c	21	21

Quarterfinals
6	(India) M Attri (India) B S Reddy	10	20
2	(South Korea) Ko S-h (South Korea) Shin B-c	21	22

== Women's doubles ==
=== Seeds ===
1. (South Korea) Jung Kyung-eun / Shin Seung-chan (quarterfinals)
2. (South Korea) Chang Ye-na / Lee So-hee (final)
3. (Japan) Reika Kakiiwa / Miyuki Maeda (withdrawn)
4. (India) Jwala Gutta / Ashwini Ponnappa (quarterfinals)

=== Finals ===
Semifinals
(Japan) Yuki Fukushima (Japan) Sayaka Hirota	21	21
(Australia) Setyana Mapasa (Australia) Gronya Somerville	11	7
(South Korea) Go Ah-ra (South Korea) Yoo Hae-won	15	21	19
2	(South Korea) Chang Ye-na (South Korea) Lee So-hee	21	17	21

Final
(Japan) Yuki Fukushima (Japan) Sayaka Hirota	21	21
2	(South Korea) Chang Ye-na (South Korea) Lee So-hee	13	16

=== Top half ===
==== Section 1 ====
First Round
1	(South Korea) Jung K-e (South Korea) Shin S-c
BYE
(China) Huang DP (China) Zhong QX	21	21
(New Zealand) S Fu (New Zealand) C Zhang	9	5
(United States) E Lee (United States) P L Obanana
BYE
(Japan) Y Fukushima (Japan) S Hirota	21	14	21
(Indonesia) N P Lestari (Indonesia) M C Sahputri	12	21	12

Second Round
1	(South Korea) Jung K-e (South Korea) Shin S-c	21	22	21
(China) Huang DP (China) Zhong QX	16	24	16
(United States) E Lee (United States) P L Obanana
(Japan) Y Fukushima (Japan) S Hirota	w	/	o

Quarterfinals
1	(South Korea) Jung K-e (South Korea) Shin S-c	15	21	19
(Japan) Y Fukushima (Japan) S Hirota	21	12	21

==== Section 2 ====
First Round
4	(India) J Gutta (India) A Ponnappa
BYE
(Japan) M Matsumoto (Japan) W Nagahara	21	21
(New Zealand) M Masinipeni (New Zealand) Jasmin Ng C M	8	5
(Australia) S Mapasa (Australia) G Somerville
BYE
(Japan) S Tanaka (Japan) K Yonemoto	21	21
(Australia) T Ho (Australia) J Tam	8	8

Second Round
4	(India) J Gutta (India) A Ponnappa	10	23	21
(Japan) M Matsumoto (Japan) W Nagahara	21	21	15
(Australia) S Mapasa (Australia) G Somerville	12	21	23
(Japan) S Tanaka (Japan) K Yonemoto	21	17	21

Quarterfinals
4	(India) J Gutta (India) A Ponnappa	22	8
(Australia) S Mapasa (Australia) G Somerville	24	21

=== Bottom half ===
==== Section 3 ====
First Round
(South Korea) Go A-r (South Korea) Yoo H-w	21	16	21
(China) Du Y (China) Xu Y	13	21	18
(Australia) C Lam (Australia) M Sun	21	21
(New Zealand) K Stern (New Zealand) J Villegas	14	11
(South Korea) Eom H-w (South Korea) Kim H-n	21	21
(New Zealand) E Calder-Hawkins (New Zealand) S Wu	10	6
BYE
3	(Japan) R Kakiiwa (Japan) M Maeda

Second Round
(South Korea) Go A-r (South Korea) Yoo H-w	21	21
(Australia) C Lam (Australia) M Sun	1	7
(South Korea) Eom H-w (South Korea) Kim H-n	w	/	o
3	(Japan) R Kakiiwa (Japan) M Maeda

Quarterfinals
(South Korea) Go A-r (South Korea) Yoo H-w	21	21
(South Korea) Eom H-w (South Korea) Kim H-n	14	15

==== Section 4 ====
First Round
(Indonesia) T R Nuraidah (Indonesia) R A Pradipta	21	21
(New Zealand) S Leydon-Davis (New Zealand) D Tahuri	11	8
BYE
(Japan) A Higashino (Japan) N Shinoya
(New Zealand) V Copeland (New Zealand) A Pak	17	2
(Chinese Taipei) Cheng C-y (Chinese Taipei) Cheng Y-c	21	21
BYE
2	(South Korea) Chang Y-n (South Korea) Lee S-h

Second Round
(Indonesia) T R Nuraidah (Indonesia) R A Pradipta	18	16
(Japan) A Higashino (Japan) N Shinoya	21	21
(Chinese Taipei) Cheng C-y (Chinese Taipei) Cheng Y-c	11	7
2	(South Korea) Chang Y-n (South Korea) Lee S-h	21	21

Quarterfinals
(Japan) A Higashino (Japan) N Shinoya	14	13
2	(South Korea) Chang Y-n (South Korea) Lee S-h	21	21

== Mixed doubles ==
=== Seeds ===
1. (South Korea) Ko Sung-hyun / Kim Ha-na (semifinals)
2. (South Korea) Shin Baek-cheol / Chae Yoo-jung (semifinals)
3. (Malaysia) Chan Peng Soon / Goh Liu Ying (champion)
4. (South Korea) Choi Sol-gyu / Eom Hye-won (first round)
5. (Russia) Vitalij Durkin / Nina Vislova (withdrawn)
6. (United States) Phillip Chew / Jamie Subandhi (withdrawn)
7. (France) Ronan Labar / Emilie Lefel (second round)
8. (South Korea) Kim Gi-jung / Shin Seung-chan (first round)

=== Finals ===
Semifinals
1	(South Korea) Ko Sung-hyun (South Korea) Kim Ha-na	19	21	22
3	(Malaysia) Chan Peng Soon (Malaysia) Goh Liu Ying	21	10	24
(China) Zheng Siwei (China) Li Yinhui	22	15	21
2	(South Korea) Shin Baek-cheol (South Korea) Chae Yoo-jung	20	21	18

Final
3	(Malaysia) Chan Peng Soon (Malaysia) Goh Liu Ying	21	22
(China) Zheng Siwei (China) Li Yinhui	19	20

=== Top half ===
==== Section 1 ====
First Round
1	(South Korea) Ko S-h (South Korea) Kim H-n	22	21
(Singapore) D B Chrisnanta (Singapore) Vanessa Neo Y Y	20	19
Q4	(Australia) H Tang (Australia) J Lai	13	8
(China) He JT (China) Du Y	21	21
PFQ	(Chinese Taipei) Lee C-h (Chinese Taipei) Cheng C-y	14	21	10
(Japan) Y Watanabe (Japan) A Higashino	21	16	21
(Japan) Y Kaneko (Japan) C Hoshi	21	21
(New Zealand) M Phillips (New Zealand) A Pak	4	7

Second Round
1	(South Korea) Ko S-h (South Korea) Kim H-n	22	21	21
(China) He JT (China) Du Y	24	16	11
(Japan) Y Watanabe (Japan) A Higashino	21	21
(Japan) Y Kaneko (Japan) C Hoshi	8	13

Quarterfinals
1	(South Korea) Ko S-h (South Korea) Kim H-n	17	21	25
(Japan) Y Watanabe (Japan) A Higashino	21	15	23

==== Section 2 ====
First Round
3	(Malaysia) Chan P S (Malaysia) Goh L Y	22	21
(Chinese Taipei) Chang K-c (Chinese Taipei) Chang H-t	20	15
(New Zealand) O Leydon-Davis (New Zealand) S Leydon-Davis	15	17
(Australia) M Chau (Australia) G Somerville	21	21
7	(France) R Labar (France) E Lefel	21	21
(Australia) C Chen (Australia) C Lam	5	3
(Indonesia) H Faisal (Indonesia) S D Aulia	21	23
(China) Han CK (China) Xu Y	15	21

Second Round
3	(Malaysia) Chan P S (Malaysia) Goh L Y	21	18	21
(Australia) M Chau (Australia) G Somerville	16	21	16
7	(France) R Labar (France) E Lefel	21	16	15
(Indonesia) H Faisal (Indonesia) S D Aulia	17	21	21

Quarterfinals
3	(Malaysia) Chan P S (Malaysia) Goh L Y	21	21
(Indonesia) H Faisal (Indonesia) S D Aulia	12	11

=== Bottom half ===
==== Section 3 ====
First Round
(Chinese Taipei) Lu C-p (Chinese Taipei) Cheng Y-c	14	21	20
(Japan) Y Kobayashi (Japan) Y Fukushima	21	17	22
(Indonesia) A E Prasetya (Indonesia) A Saufika	21	19	21
8	(South Korea) Kim G-j (South Korea) Shin S-c	17	21	17
Q1	(Scotland) A Casey (Australia) M Sun	16	17
(Australia) S Serasinghe (Australia) S Mapasa	21	21
(China) Zheng SW (China) Li YH	23	19	21
4	(South Korea) Choi S-g (South Korea) Eom H-w	21	21	11

Second Round
(Japan) Y Kobayashi (Japan) Y Fukushima	19	21	21
(Indonesia) A E Prasetya (Indonesia) A Saufika	21	17	19
(Australia) S Serasinghe (Australia) S Mapasa	17	8
(China) Zheng SW (China) Li YH	21	21

Quarterfinals
(Japan) Y Kobayashi (Japan) Y Fukushima	15	20
(China) Zheng SW (China) Li YH	21	22

==== Section 4 ====
First Round
Q3	(Japan) T Inoue (Japan) N Shinoya	21	21
(New Zealand) S Masinipeni (New Zealand) M Masinipeni	2	7
(India) P J Chopra (India) N S Reddy	21	21
PFQ	(Australia) J Sun (Australia) J Tam	8	9
(Australia) R Middleton (Australia) L Choo	13	21	12
Q2	(India) M Attri (India) A Ponnappa	21	10	21
(China) Huang KX (China) Huang DP	18	21	14
2	(South Korea) Shin B-c (South Korea) Chae Y-j	21	13	21

Second Round
Q3	(Japan) T Inoue (Japan) N Shinoya	16	13
(India) P J Chopra (India) N S Reddy	21	21
Q2	(India) M Attri (India) A Ponnappa	17	19
2	(South Korea) Shin B-c (South Korea) Chae Y-j	21	21

Quarterfinals
(India) P J Chopra (India) N S Reddy	14	18
2	(South Korea) Shin B-c (South Korea) Chae Y-j	21	21

Preceded by 2016 Swiss Open Grand Prix Gold	BWF Grand Prix and Grand Prix Gold; 2016 BWF Season	Succeeded by 2016 China Masters Grand Prix Gold
