= 2025 Oceania Badminton Championships =

Tournament details
- Dates: 10–12 February (mixed team event); 13–16 February (individual event)
- Edition: 19th
- Venue: Badminton North Harbour Centre
- Location: Forrest Hill, Auckland, New Zealand

The 2025 Oceania Badminton Championships (officially known as the Victor Oceania Championships 2025 for sponsorship reasons) was a continental badminton championships in Oceania sanctioned by the Badminton Oceania, and Badminton World Federation. The mixed team and individual events were held from 10 to 12 and 13 to 16 February 2025, respectively.

== Tournament ==
The 2025 Oceania Badminton Championships was the 19th edition of the Oceania Championships.

This tournament was organized by Badminton North Harbour and Badminton Oceania, and sanctioned by the Badminton World Federation.

=== Venue ===
The tournament was held at the Badminton North Harbour Centre, Forrest Hill, Auckland, New Zealand.

=== Point distribution ===
Below is the point distribution table for each phase of the tournament based on the BWF points system of the Oceania Badminton Championships, which is equivalent to a BWF International Challenge event.

Winner	Runner-up	3/4	5/8	9/16	17/32	33/64
4,000	3,400	2,800	2,200	1,520	920	360

=== Prize pool ===
Below is the prize money for the individual event.

Event	Winner	Finalist	Semi-finals
Singles	NZD900	NZD600	NZD250
Doubles	NZD900	NZD600	NZD250

== Medal summary ==
=== Medalists ===
Event	Gold	Silver	Bronze
Mixed team	Australia; Kaitlyn Ea; Tiffany Ho; Gronya Somerville; Huaidong Tang; Ricky Tang; Kai Qi Teoh; Angela Yu; Jack Yu; Frederick Zhao	New Zealand; Chris Benzie; Raphael Deloy; Adam Jeffrey; Edward Lau; Shaunna Li; Yanxi Liu; Dylan Soedjasa; Josephine Zhao; Camellia Zhou; Jenny Zhu	Tahiti; Antoine Beaubois; Louis Beaubois; Heirautea Curet; May Gaymann; Yann Jeandroz; Méiissa Mi You; Mike Mi You; Rémi Rossi; Esther Tau; Heiva Yvonet
Men's singles	(Australia) Jack Yu	(New Zealand) Edward Lau	(Australia) Shrey Dhand
Men's singles	(Australia) Jack Yu	(New Zealand) Edward Lau	(Australia) Ephraim Sam
Women's singles	(New Zealand) Shaunna Li	(Australia) Tiffany Ho	(New Zealand) Jenny Zhu
Women's singles	(New Zealand) Shaunna Li	(Australia) Tiffany Ho	(Australia) Victoria Tjonadi
Men's doubles	(New Zealand) Adam Jeffrey (New Zealand) Dylan Soedjasa	(Australia) Huaidong Tang (Australia) Frederick Zhao	(New Zealand) Vincent Tao (New Zealand) Dacmen Vong
Men's doubles	(New Zealand) Adam Jeffrey (New Zealand) Dylan Soedjasa	(Australia) Huaidong Tang (Australia) Frederick Zhao	(New Zealand) Chan Yun Lung (New Zealand) Chance Cheng
Women's doubles	(Australia) Gronya Somerville (Australia) Angela Yu	(Australia) Mimi Ngo (Australia) Maureen Clarissa Wijaya	(Australia) Priska Kustiadi (New Zealand) Camellia Zhou
Women's doubles	(Australia) Gronya Somerville (Australia) Angela Yu	(Australia) Mimi Ngo (Australia) Maureen Clarissa Wijaya	(Australia) Maggie Chan (Australia) Kaitlyn Ea
Mixed doubles	(New Zealand) Vincent Tao (Australia) Gronya Somerville	(New Zealand) Edward Lau (New Zealand) Shaunna Li	(New Zealand) Dylan Soedjasa (New Zealand) Camellia Zhou
Mixed doubles	(New Zealand) Vincent Tao (Australia) Gronya Somerville	(New Zealand) Edward Lau (New Zealand) Shaunna Li	(New Zealand) Dacmen Vong (Australia) Priska Kustiadi

=== Medal table ===
* Host nation (New Zealand)

Rank	Nation	Gold	Silver	Bronze	Total
1	Australia	3.5	3	5	11.5
2	New Zealand*	2.5	3	5	10.5
3	Tahiti	0	0	1	1
Totals (3 entries)		6	6	11	23

== Men's singles ==
=== Seeds ===
1. (New Zealand) Edward Lau (final)
2. (Australia) Jack Yu (champion)
3. (Australia) Ricky Tang (quarter-finals)
4. (Australia) Nathan Tang (fourth round)
5. (Australia) Kai Chen Teoh (quarter-finals)
6. (Australia) Keith Mark Edison (quarter-finals)
7. (Australia) Shrey Dhand (semi-finals)
8. (Australia) Ken Richardson (quarter-finals)
9. (New Zealand) Avinash Shastri (fourth round)
10. (Australia) Pit Seng Low (fourth round)
11. (Australia) Asher Ooi (fourth round)
12. (New Zealand) Chris Benzie (fourth round)
13. (New Zealand) Ricky Cheng (fourth round)
14. (Australia) Ephraim Sam (semi-finals)
15. (New Zealand) Jonathan Curtin (second round)
16. (Australia) William Sayaphet (second round)

=== Finals ===
Quarter-finals
1	(New Zealand) Edward Lau	21	21
5	(Australia) Kai Chen Teoh	9	13
3	(Australia) Ricky Tang	21	15	14
7	(Australia) Shrey Dhand	14	21	21
6	(Australia) Keith Mark Edison	21	15	17
14	(Australia) Ephraim Sam	17	21	21
8	(Australia) Ken Richardson	14	18
2	(Australia) Jack Yu	21	21

Semi-finals
1	(New Zealand) Edward Lau	21	19	21
7	(Australia) Shrey Dhand	14	21	13
14	(Australia) Ephraim Sam	11	14
2	(Australia) Jack Yu	21	21

Final
1	(New Zealand) Edward Lau
2	(Australia) Jack Yu	w	/	o

=== Top half ===
==== Section 1 ====
First round
(Australia) J Lim	21	21
(New Zealand) B Li	13	14
(New Zealand) W Lau	21	21
(New Caledonia) L Guyenne	8	9
(New Zealand) T Yu	21	21
(Fiji) M Feussner	10	9

Second round
1	(New Zealand) E Lau	21	21
(Australia) C H Lau	10	6
(New Zealand) A Coumbe	8	12
(Australia) J Lim	21	21
10	(Australia) P S Low	21	19	21
(New Zealand) W Lau	19	21	15
(Australia) Tan Z-r	15	18
(New Zealand) T Yu	21	21

Third round
1	(New Zealand) E Lau	21	21
(Australia) J Lim	10	16
10	(Australia) P S Low	21	21
(New Zealand) T Yu	13	19

Fourth round
1	(New Zealand) E Lau	21	21
10	(Australia) P S Low	18	5

==== Section 2 ====
First round
(New Zealand) A Lee	21	12	15
(French Polynesia) M Mi You	18	21	21
(New Zealand) E van der Ley	10	16
(Australia) R Lydra	21	21
(New Zealand) J Xie	22	10	21
(Fiji) L Fong	20	21	18
(French Polynesia) A Beaubois	21	21
(New Zealand) L Zhu	15	19

Second round
5	(Australia) K C Teoh	21	21
(French Polynesia) M Mi You	10	4
(New Caledonia) M Sargito	7	3
(Australia) R Lydra	21	21
16	(Australia) W Sayaphet	21	9	20
(New Zealand) J Xie	19	21	22
(Australia) T Ling	15	12
(French Polynesia) A Beaubois	21	21

Third round
5	(Australia) K C Teoh	21	21
(Australia) R Lydra	14	13
(New Zealand) J Xie	10	7
(French Polynesia) A Beaubois	21	21

Fourth round
5	(Australia) K C Teoh	9	21	21
(French Polynesia) A Beaubois	21	12	18

==== Section 3 ====
First round
(New Zealand) M Hui	7	10
(French Polynesia) R Rossi	21	21
(Australia) D Han	18	18
(New Zealand) S Navarra	21	21
(Australia) M Su	21	21
(New Caledonia) A Milesi	10	10

Second round
3	(Australia) R Tang	21	21
(New Zealand) J X Tan	7	9
(Australia) D Wang	6	8
(French Polynesia) R Rossi	21	21
13	(New Zealand) R Cheng	21	11	23
(New Zealand) S Navarra	9	21	21
(New Zealand) J Wu	13	21	16
(Australia) M Su	21	13	21

Third round
3	(Australia) R Tang	21	21
(French Polynesia) R Rossi	11	10
13	(New Zealand) R Cheng	21	21
(Australia) M Su	7	8

Fourth round
3	(Australia) R Tang	21	21
13	(New Zealand) R Cheng	7	12

==== Section 4 ====
First round
(New Zealand) O Wu	15	21	18
(Australia) F Huang	21	16	21
(New Caledonia) T Sargito	14	10
(Australia) S Shen	21	21
(Cook Islands) K Mataio	21	15	21
(New Zealand) O Liu	8	21	18
(New Zealand) J Virk	w	/	o
(Fiji) M Kacimaiwai

Second round
7	(Australia) S Dhand	21	21
(Australia) F Huang	10	10
(New Zealand) D Chan	13	21	21
(Australia) S Shen	21	7	14
11	(Australia) A Ooi	21	21
(Cook Islands) K Mataio	10	9
(Australia) L Kurniawan	w	/	o
(New Zealand) J Virk

Third round
7	(Australia) S Dhand	21	21
(New Zealand) D Chan	11	12
11	(Australia) A Ooi	21	19	21
(Australia) L Kurniawan	18	21	9

Fourth round
7	(Australia) S Dhand	21	21
11	(Australia) A Ooi	15	15

=== Bottom half ===
==== Section 5 ====
First round
(Solomon Islands) B Guan	3	3
(Australia) T Sentosa	21	21
(New Zealand) L Chen	7	11
(Australia) A Nirmal	21	21
(Australia) R Joseph Biju	21	21
(New Zealand) R Soo-Jones	9	10
(New Zealand) P Doehrn	21	21
(Fiji) J Tang	7	14

Second round
(Australia) T Sentosa	21	21
(New Zealand) T Smith	5	12
(Australia) A Nirmal	13	18
12	(New Zealand) C Benzie	21	21
(Australia) R Joseph Biju	21	21
(Cook Islands) E Mataio	9	13
(New Zealand) P Doehrn	11	18
6	(Australia) K M Edison	21	21

Third round
(Australia) T Sentosa	14	12
12	(New Zealand) C Benzie	21	21
(Australia) R Joseph Biju	8	15
6	(Australia) K M Edison	21	21

Fourth round
12	(New Zealand) C Benzie	14	13
6	(Australia) K M Edison	21	21

==== Section 6 ====
First round
(New Caledonia) J Milesi	8	6
(New Zealand) R Deloy	21	21
(New Zealand) D Hu	21	21
(French Polynesia) E Maublanc	9	11
(Australia) C Yu	21	21
(New Zealand) An Pang	6	6

Second round
(New Zealand) R Deloy	21	21
(Australia) E Rusli	12	13
(New Zealand) D Hu	14	14
14	(Australia) Ep Sam	21	21
(Australia) C Yu	21	21
(Australia) P Halim	14	13
(New Zealand) L Qin	8	12
4	(Australia) N Tang	21	21

Third round
(New Zealand) R Deloy	20	11
14	(Australia) Ep Sam	22	21
(Australia) C Yu	21	19	19
4	(Australia) N Tang	10	21	21

Fourth round
14	(Australia) Ep Sam	22	21
4	(Australia) N Tang	20	11

==== Section 7 ====
First round
(New Zealand) J Ji
(Australia) K Goh	w	/	o
(Australia) N Pham	21	21
(New Caledonia) J Guyenne	9	15
(Fiji) C H Kim	14	15
(New Zealand) C Wei	21	21
(New Zealand) D Vong	21	21
(Cook Islands) D Akavi	6	6

Second round
(Australia) K Goh	21	21
(New Zealand) A Kesana	4	5
(Australia) N Pham	21	21
15	(New Zealand) J Curtin	18	12
(New Zealand) C Wei	11	12
(Australia) V Nguyen	21	21
(New Zealand) D Vong	10	16
8	(Australia) K Richardson	21	21

Third round
(Australia) K Goh	21	21
(Australia) N Pham	9	15
(Australia) V Nguyen	15	13
8	(Australia) K Richardson	21	21

Fourth round
(Australia) K Goh	21	22	9
8	(Australia) K Richardson	18	24	21

==== Section 8 ====
First round
(New Caledonia) T Bourgeois	11	10
(Australia) Em Sam	21	21
(New Zealand) WX Li	13	21	18
(Australia) K Lew	21	18	21
(Australia) Lim S-y	10	11
(French Polynesia) L Beaubois	21	21

Second round
(Australia) Em Sam	21	21
(New Zealand) D Huang	13	13
(Australia) K Lew	17	16
9	(New Zealand) A Shastri	21	21
(French Polynesia) L Beaubois	21	21
(New Zealand) Al Pang	6	8
(New Zealand) E Lu	14	16
2	(Australia) J Yu	21	21

Third round
(Australia) Em Sam	16	21	19
9	(New Zealand) A Shastri	21	15	21
(French Polynesia) L Beaubois	3	4
2	(Australia) J Yu	21	21

Fourth round
9	(New Zealand) A Shastri	5	10
2	(Australia) J Yu	21	21

== Women's singles ==
=== Seeds ===
1. (Australia) Tiffany Ho (final)
2. (Australia) Kai Qi Teoh (quarter-finals)
3. (New Zealand) Shaunna Li (champion)
4. (Australia) Yuelin Zhang (quarter-finals)
5. (New Zealand) Jenny Zhu (semi-finals)
6. (Australia) Sydney Tjonadi (quarter-finals)
7. (Australia) Victoria Tjonadi (semi-finals)
8. (Australia) Faye Huo (quarter-finals)

=== Finals ===
Semi-finals
1	(Australia) Tiffany Ho	21	21
5	(New Zealand) Jenny Zhu	19	10
3	(New Zealand) Shaunna Li	21	21
7	(Australia) Victoria Tjonadi	8	9

Final
1	(Australia) Tiffany Ho	25	10	18
3	(New Zealand) Shaunna Li	23	21	21

=== Top half ===
==== Section 1 ====
First round

Second round
1	(Australia) T Ho	21	21
(Fiji) E L Shamim	3	5
(New Zealand) R Yang	21	21
(Cook Islands) T Nicholas-Herman	8	6
8	(Australia) F Huo	24	17	21
(New Zealand) A Wang	22	21	15
(French Polynesia) M Mi You	10	7
(New Zealand) ZR Cao	21	21

Third round
(Australia) T Ho	21	21
(New Zealand) R Yang	16	14
8	(Australia) F Huo	21	21
(New Zealand) ZR Cao	9	17

Quarter-finals
1	(Australia) T Ho	21	9	21
8	(Australia) F Huo	17	21	19

==== Section 2 ====
First round

Second round
4	(Australia) YL Zhang	21	24
(New Zealand) J Zhao	16	22
(New Zealand) M Cai	w	/	o
(Fiji) M Chung
5	(New Zealand) J Zhu	21	21
(French Polynesia) M Siao	5	11
(Australia) R Bairy	21	14	21
(New Zealand) ZW Guo	14	21	13

Third round
4	(Australia) YL Zhang	21	21
(New Zealand) M Cai	10	6
5	(New Zealand) J Zhu	21	21
(Australia) R Bairy	6	8

Quarter-finals
4	(Australia) YL Zhang	14	21	12
5	(New Zealand) J Zhu	21	15	21

=== Bottom half ===
==== Section 3 ====
First round
(New Zealand) R Zhang	21	21
(French Polynesia) E Tau	10	10

Second round
(New Zealand) R Zhang	21	21
(Cook Islands) T P Tupa	9	13
(New Zealand) M Xu	16	6
6	(Australia) S Tjonadi	21	21
(New Zealand) G Galvez	12	21	12
(Australia) S Adepu	21	17	21
(Australia) M Ngo	18	14
3	(New Zealand) S Li	21	21

Third round
(New Zealand) R Zhang	5	10
6	(Australia) S Tjonadi	21	21
(Australia) S Adepu	17	19
3	(New Zealand) S Li	21	21

Quarter-finals
6	(Australia) S Tjonadi	8	13
3	(New Zealand) S Li	21	21

==== Section 4 ====
First round

Second round
(New Zealand) J Lee	21	21
(Fiji) L Chung	7	9
(New Zealand) YX Liu	12	18
7	(Australia) V Tjonadi	21	21
(Cook Islands) L Toa	9	13
(New Zealand) C Zhu	21	21
(French Polynesia) H Curet	7	12
2	(Australia) K Q Teoh	21	21

Third round
(New Zealand) J Lee	7	11
7	(Australia) V Tjonadi	21	21
(New Zealand) C Zhu	5	15
2	(Australia) K Q Teoh	21	21

Quarter-finals
7	(Australia) V Tjonadi	21	21
2	(Australia) K Q Teoh	13	19

== Men's doubles ==
=== Seeds ===
1. (Australia) Keith Mark Edison / Jack Yu (quarter-finals)
2. (New Zealand) Adam Jeffrey / Dylan Soedjasa (champions)
3. (Australia) Ken Richardson / Ephraim Sam (quarter-finals)
4. (New Zealand) Jonathan Curtin / Avinash Shastri (quarter-finals)
5. (Australia) Asher Ooi / Ricky Tang (third round)
6. (New Zealand) Jack Wang / Lezhi Zhu (third round)
7. (New Zealand) Ryan Soo-Jones / Oscar Wu (second round)
8. (Australia) Huaidong Tang / Frederick Zhao (final)

=== Finals ===
Semi-finals
(New Zealand) Vincent Tao (New Zealand) Dacmen Vong	13	21	8
8	(Australia) Huaidong Tang (Australia) Frederick Zhao	21	17	21
(New Zealand) Chan Yun Lung (New Zealand) Chance Cheng	18	17
2	(New Zealand) Adam Jeffrey (New Zealand) Dylan Soedjasa	21	21

Final
8	(Australia) Huaidong Tang (Australia) Frederick Zhao	13	10
2	(New Zealand) Adam Jeffrey (New Zealand) Dylan Soedjasa	21	21

=== Top half ===
==== Section 1 ====
First round
(New Zealand) D Huang (New Zealand) C Wei	15	19
(Australia) J Lim (Australia) Jo Wang	21	21
(French Polynesia) R Rossi (French Polynesia) H Yvonet	17	11
(New Zealand) V Tao (New Zealand) D Vong	21	21

Second round
1	(Australia) K M Edison (Australia) J Yu	21	21
(New Caledonia) T Bourgeois (New Caledonia) J Guyenne	7	10
(Cook Islands) K Mataio (Cook Islands) D Simpson	9	14
(Australia) J Lim (Australia) Jo Wang	21	21
6	(New Zealand) Ja Wang (New Zealand) LZ Zhu	21	24
(Australia) A Nirmal (Australia) Em Sam	17	22
(Australia) R Joseph Biju (Australia) T Ling	20	14
(New Zealand) V Tao (New Zealand) D Vong	22	21

Third round
1	(Australia) K M Edison (Australia) J Yu	21	21
(Australia) J Lim (Australia) Jo Wang	12	18
6	(New Zealand) Ja Wang (New Zealand) LZ Zhu	16	21	16
(New Zealand) V Tao (New Zealand) D Vong	21	18	21

Quarter-finals
1	(Australia) K M Edison (Australia) J Yu	19	21	13
(New Zealand) V Tao (New Zealand) D Vong	21	15	21

==== Section 2 ====
First round
(New Zealand) W Lau (New Zealand) J X Tan	12	24	9
(French Polynesia) A Beaubois (French Polynesia) Y Jeandroz	21	22	21
(Fiji) M Feussner (Fiji) M Kacimaiwai
(New Zealand) D Chan (New Zealand) L Chen	w	/	o
(Australia) R Lydra (Australia) E Rusli	21	21
(New Zealand) L Qin (Australia) S Shen	16	17

Second round
4	(New Zealand) J Curtin (New Zealand) A Shastri	21	21
(Australia) F Huang (Australia) F Truong	19	17
(Australia) J Lee (Australia) K C Teoh	w	/	o
(French Polynesia) A Beaubois (French Polynesia) Y Jeandroz
8	(Australia) HD Tang (Australia) F Zhao	21	21
(New Zealand) D Chan (New Zealand) L Chen	13	16
(New Zealand) WX Li (New Zealand) J Wang	8	18
(Australia) R Lydra (Australia) E Rusli	21	21

Third round
4	(New Zealand) J Curtin (New Zealand) A Shastri	21	21
(Australia) J Lee (Australia) K C Teoh	18	19
8	(Australia) HD Tang (Australia) F Zhao	21	21
(Australia) R Lydra (Australia) E Rusli	15	12

Quarter-finals
4	(New Zealand) J Curtin (New Zealand) A Shastri	8	19
8	(Australia) HD Tang (Australia) F Zhao	21	21

=== Bottom half ===
==== Section 3 ====
First round
(Fiji) L Fong (New Zealand) D Vong	12	9
(New Zealand) Chan Y L (New Zealand) C Cheng	21	21
(Australia) K Lew (Australia) Lim S-y	21	21
(Cook Islands) D Akavi (Cook Islands) E Mataio	11	6
(New Zealand) P Doehrn (New Zealand) T Smith	14	10
(Australia) S Dhand (Australia) T Sentosa	21	21

Second round
(New Zealand) Chan Y L (New Zealand) C Cheng	21	22
(Australia) V Nguyen (Australia) W Sayaphet	14	20
(Australia) K Lew (Australia) Lim S-y	21	21
7	(New Zealand) R Soo-Jones (New Zealand) O Wu	12	13
(Australia) S Dhand (Australia) T Sentosa	21	21
(New Caledonia) M Sargito (New Caledonia) T Sargito	11	10
(New Zealand) A Coumbe (New Zealand) B Li	15	11
3	(Australia) K Richardson (Australia) Ep Sam	21	21

Third round
(New Zealand) Chan Y L (New Zealand) C Cheng	21	21
(Australia) K Lew (Australia) Lim S-y	11	11
(Australia) S Dhand (Australia) T Sentosa	17	21	17
3	(Australia) K Richardson (Australia) Ep Sam	21	19	21

Quarter-finals
(New Zealand) Chan Y L (New Zealand) C Cheng	21	15	21
3	(Australia) K Richardson (Australia) Ep Sam	12	21	17

==== Section 4 ====
First round
(New Caledonia) A Milesi (New Caledonia) J Milesi	20	21	19
(Fiji) S S Low (Australia) D Wang	22	14	21
(New Zealand) R Deloy (New Zealand) S Navarra	21	21
(Fiji) C H Kim (Fiji) J Tang	11	10
(New Zealand) J Wu (New Zealand) J Xie	21	21
(French Polynesia) L Beaubois (French Polynesia) E Maublanc	17	13

Second round
(Fiji) S S Low (Australia) D Wang	9	14
(New Zealand) C Benzie (New Zealand) D Hu	21	21
(New Zealand) R Deloy (New Zealand) S Navarra	16	21	19
5	(Australia) A Ooi (Australia) R Tang	21	18	21
(New Zealand) J Wu (New Zealand) J Xie	14	21	10
(Australia) D Han (Australia) E Zhang	21	19	21
(Australia) P Halim (Australia) L Kurniawan	16	18
2	(New Zealand) A Jeffrey (New Zealand) D Soedjasa	21	21

Third round
(New Zealand) C Benzie (New Zealand) D Hu	21	21
5	(Australia) A Ooi (Australia) R Tang	15	17
(Australia) D Han (Australia) E Zhang	15	11
2	(New Zealand) A Jeffrey (New Zealand) D Soedjasa	21	21

Quarter-finals
(New Zealand) C Benzie (New Zealand) D Hu	9	11
2	(New Zealand) A Jeffrey (New Zealand) D Soedjasa	21	21

== Women's doubles ==
=== Seeds ===
1. (Australia) Sydney Tjonadi / Victoria Tjonadi (quarter-finals)
2. (Australia) Gronya Somerville / Angela Yu (champions)
3. (Australia) Priska Kustiadi / (New Zealand) Camellia Zhou (semi-finals)
4. (New Zealand) Gaea Galvez / Jenny Zhu (second round)

=== Finals ===
Semi-finals
(Australia) Mimi Ngo (Australia) Maureen Clarissa Wijaya	24	12	21
3	(Australia) Priska Kustiadi (New Zealand) Camellia Zhou	22	21	16
(Australia) Maggie Chan (Australia) Kaitlyn Ea	18	15
2	(Australia) Gronya Somerville (Australia) Angela Yu	21	21

Final
(Australia) Mimi Ngo (Australia) Maureen Clarissa Wijaya	10	12
2	(Australia) Gronya Somerville (Australia) Angela Yu	21	21

=== Top half ===
==== Section 1 ====
First round

Second round
1	(Australia) S Tjonadi (Australia) V Tjonadi	21	21
(New Zealand) J Lee (New Zealand) X Lin	5	17
(New Zealand) QX Yang (New Zealand) C Zhu	12	15
(Australia) M Ngo (Australia) M C Wijaya	21	21

Quarter-finals
1	(Australia) S Tjonadi (Australia) V Tjonadi	21	25	20
(Australia) M Ngo (Australia) M C Wijaya	16	27	22

==== Section 2 ====
First round
(Australia) J Lam (New Zealand) B Li	21	21
(French Polynesia) M Mi You (French Polynesia) M Siao	8	5

Second round
3	(Australia) P Kustiadi (New Zealand) C Zhou	21	21
(New Zealand) R Yang (New Zealand) J Zhao	15	9
(Cook Islands) L Toa (Cook Islands) T P Tupa	7	7
(Australia) J Lam (New Zealand) B Li	21	21

Quarter-finals
3	(Australia) P Kustiadi (New Zealand) C Zhou	21	21
(Australia) J Lam (New Zealand) B Li	15	15

=== Bottom half ===
==== Section 3 ====
First round
(Australia) C Sam (Australia) J Zheng	21	21
(New Zealand) M Cai (New Zealand) M Xu	18	8

Second round
(Australia) C Sam (Australia) J Zheng	21	21
(French Polynesia) H Curet (French Polynesia) E Tau	18	8
(Australia) M Chan (Australia) K Ea	21	19	21
4	(New Zealand) G Galvez (New Zealand) J Zhu	14	21	11

Quarter-finals
(Australia) C Sam (Australia) J Zheng	12	13
(Australia) M Chan (Australia) K Ea	21	21

==== Section 4 ====
First round

Second round
(Australia) Lim Y-y (New Zealand) A Wang	w	/	o
(Fiji) L Chung (Fiji) M Chung
(New Zealand) ZR Cao (New Zealand) J Villegas	7	8
2	(Australia) G Somerville (Australia) A Yu	21	21

Quarter-finals
(Australia) Lim Y-y (New Zealand) A Wang	10	10
2	(Australia) G Somerville (Australia) A Yu	21	21

== Mixed doubles ==
=== Seeds ===
1. (New Zealand) Edward Lau / Shaunna Li (final)
2. (New Zealand) Adam Jeffrey / Justine Villegas (second round)
3. (Australia) Frederick Zhao / Yuelin Zhang (third round)
4. (New Zealand) Dylan Soedjasa / Camellia Zhou (semi-finals)
5. (New Zealand) Vincent Tao / (Australia) Gronya Somerville (champions)
6. (New Zealand) Samuel Navarra / (Australia) Maureen Clarissa Wijaya (quarter-finals)
7. (Australia) Jordan Wang / Sydney Tjonadi (third round)
8. (New Zealand) Dacmen Vong / (Australia) Priska Kustiadi (semi-finals)

=== Finals ===
Semi-finals
1	(New Zealand) Edward Lau (New Zealand) Shaunna Li	21	21
4	(New Zealand) Dylan Soedjasa (New Zealand) Camellia Zhou	10	11
5	(New Zealand) Vincent Tao (Australia) Gronya Somerville	21	21
8	(New Zealand) Dacmen Vong (Australia) Priska Kustiadi	13	13

Final
1	(New Zealand) Edward Lau (New Zealand) Shaunna Li	19	21	18
5	(New Zealand) Vincent Tao (Australia) Gronya Somerville	21	14	21

=== Top half ===
==== Section 1 ====
First round
(Australia) E Zhang (Australia) B Li	21	21
(New Zealand) T Yu (New Zealand) J Zhao	15	19
(Fiji) M Feussner (Fiji) E L Shamim	7	13
(New Zealand) D Hu (New Zealand) A Ung	21	21
(Australia) R Tang (Australia) K Ea	21	21
(New Zealand) WX Li (New Zealand) R Zhang	4	8

Second round
1	(New Zealand) E Lau (New Zealand) S Li	21	21
(French Polynesia) H Yvonet (French Polynesia) M Gaymann	11	9
(Australia) S Shen (New Zealand) ZW Guo	8	9
(Australia) E Zhang (Australia) B Li	21	21
7	(Australia) J Wang (Australia) S Tjonadi	21	21
(New Zealand) D Hu (New Zealand) A Ung	18	15
(New Zealand) E Lu (New Zealand) QX Yang	12	11
(Australia) R Tang (Australia) K Ea	21	21

Third round
1	(New Zealand) E Lau (New Zealand) S Li	21	21
(Australia) E Zhang (Australia) B Li	14	12
7	(Australia) J Wang (Australia) S Tjonadi	9	11
(Australia) R Tang (Australia) K Ea	21	21

Quarter-finals
1	(New Zealand) E Lau (New Zealand) S Li	21	21
(Australia) R Tang (Australia) K Ea	17	18

==== Section 2 ====
First round
(New Zealand) J Virk (New Zealand) J Lee
(French Polynesia) Y Jeandroz (French Polynesia) M Mi You	w	/	o
(New Zealand) D Chan (New Zealand) J Zhu	21	21
(Australia) K Lew (Australia) Lim Y-y	14	13
(Fiji) M Kacimaiwai (Fiji) L Chung
(New Zealand) D Vong (New Zealand) G Galvez	w	/	o

Second round
4	(New Zealand) D Soedjasa (New Zealand) C Zhou	21	21
(Cook Islands) D Akavi (Cook Islands) T Nicholas-Herman	4	6
(Australia) C Yu (Australia) J Lam	w	/	o
(French Polynesia) Y Jeandroz (French Polynesia) M Mi You
6	(New Zealand) S Navarra (Australia) M C Wijaya	21	21
(New Zealand) D Chan (New Zealand) J Zhu	13	13
(Australia) L Kurniawan (Australia) C Sam	19	21	21
(New Zealand) D Vong (New Zealand) G Galvez	21	17	15

Third round
4	(New Zealand) D Soedjasa (New Zealand) C Zhou	21	21
(Australia) C Yu (Australia) J Lam	7	9
6	(New Zealand) S Navarra (Australia) M C Wijaya	24	10	21
(Australia) L Kurniawan (Australia) C Sam	22	21	17

Quarter-finals
4	(New Zealand) D Soedjasa (New Zealand) C Zhou	21	21
6	(New Zealand) S Navarra (Australia) M C Wijaya	11	13

=== Bottom half ===
==== Section 3 ====
First round
(French Polynesia) R Rossi (French Polynesia) H Curet	21	18	21
(New Zealand) J Wu (New Zealand) C Zhu	17	21	10
(New Zealand) R Deloy (New Zealand) YX Liu	21	19	21
(Australia) T Ling (Australia) S Adepu	8	21	18
(New Zealand) J Wang (New Zealand) C Fan	16	21	13
(Australia) J Lee (Australia) J Zheng	21	17	21
(New Zealand) W Lau (New Zealand) R Yang	21	21
(Cook Islands) E Mataio (Cook Islands) L Toa	9	16

Second round
(French Polynesia) R Rossi (French Polynesia) H Curet	21	16	21
(Australia) Lim S-y (New Zealand) A Wang	11	21	19
(New Zealand) R Deloy (New Zealand) YX Liu	13	21	20
5	(New Zealand) V Tao (Australia) G Somerville	21	19	22
(Australia) J Lee (Australia) J Zheng	21	21
(New Zealand) D Huang (New Zealand) M Cai	7	7
(New Zealand) W Lau (New Zealand) R Yang	12	14
3	(Australia) F Zhao (Australia) YL Zhang	21	21

Third round
(French Polynesia) R Rossi (French Polynesia) H Curet	10	11
5	(New Zealand) V Tao (Australia) G Somerville	21	21
(Australia) J Lee (Australia) J Zheng	21	21
3	(Australia) F Zhao (Australia) YL Zhang	16	18

Quarter-finals
5	(New Zealand) V Tao (Australia) G Somerville	21	21
(Australia) J Lee (Australia) J Zheng	13	14

==== Section 4 ====
First round
(Australia) R Joseph Biju (Australia) F Huo	18	21	16
(New Zealand) J X Tan (New Zealand) ZR Cao	21	19	21
(New Zealand) L Lin (New Zealand) A Pak	16	21	21
(Australia) Em Sam (Australia) M Ngo	21	14	14
(New Zealand) T Smith (New Zealand) X Lin	16	19
(French Polynesia) A Beaubois (French Polynesia) E Tau	21	21

Second round
(New Zealand) J X Tan (New Zealand) ZR Cao	w	/	o
(Fiji) C H Kim (Fiji) M Chung
(New Zealand) L Lin (New Zealand) A Pak	14	21	16
8	(New Zealand) D Vong (Australia) P Kustiadi	21	13	21
(French Polynesia) A Beaubois (French Polynesia) E Tau	21	21
(Cook Islands) K Mataio (Cook Islands) T P Tupa	13	16
(Australia) J Lim (Australia) V Tjonadi	21	19	21
2	(New Zealand) A Jeffrey (New Zealand) J Villegas	17	21	15

Third round
(New Zealand) J X Tan (New Zealand) ZR Cao
8	(New Zealand) D Vong (Australia) P Kustiadi	w	/	o
(French Polynesia) A Beaubois (French Polynesia) E Tau	7	14
(Australia) J Lim (Australia) V Tjonadi	21	21

Quarter-finals
8	(New Zealand) D Vong (Australia) P Kustiadi	21	21
(Australia) J Lim (Australia) V Tjonadi	19	17

== Team event ==
=== Standings ===
Pos	Team	Pld	W	L	MF	MA	MD	GF	GA	GD	PF	PA	PD	Pts	
1	Australia	4	4	0	20	0	+20	40	2	+38	870	373	+497	4	Gold medal
2	New Zealand (H)	4	3	1	15	5	+10	32	11	+21	818	502	+316	3	Silver medal
3	Tahiti	4	2	2	10	10	0	21	20	+1	625	636	−11	2	Bronze medal
4	Fiji	4	1	3	3	17	−14	6	34	−28	398	792	−394	1	
5	Cook Islands	4	0	4	2	18	−16	4	36	−32	409	817	−408	0	

Source: BWF
(H) Host

==== New Zealand vs Tahiti ====
New Zealand
5
Badminton North Harbour Centre - Court 1
10 February 2025, 10:00 UTC+13
Report

Tahiti
0

			1	2	3
1	(New Zealand) (French Polynesia)	Chris Benzie; Antoine Beaubois	21; 15	14; 21	21; 16
2	(New Zealand) (French Polynesia)	Jenny Zhu; Heirautea Curet	21; 7	21; 9
3	(New Zealand) (French Polynesia)	Adam Jeffrey / Dylan Soedjasa; Antoine Beaubois / Yann Jeandroz	21; 11	21; 12
4	(New Zealand) (French Polynesia)	Josephine Zhao / Camellia Zhou; Heirautea Curet / Esther Tau	21; 9	21; 14
5	(New Zealand) (French Polynesia)	Raphael Chris Deloy / Shaunna Li; Heiva Yvonet / May Gaymann	21; 10	21; 8

==== Australia vs Fiji ====
Australia
5
Badminton North Harbour Centre - Court 2
10 February 2025, 10:00 UTC+13
Report

Fiji
0

			1	2	3
1	(Australia) (Fiji)	Ricky Tang / Kaitlyn Ea; Martin Feussner / Eileen Linda Shamim	21; 9	21; 6
2	(Australia) (Fiji)	Jack Yu; Justin Tang	21; 3	21; 4
3	(Australia) (Fiji)	Tiffany Ho; Leilah Chung	21; 3	21; 4
4	(Australia) (Fiji)	Huaidong Tang / Frederick Zhao; Liam Fong / Chang Ho Kim	21; 10	21; 9
5	(Australia) (Fiji)	Gronya Somerville / Angela Yu; Cindy Huang / Eileen Linda Shamim	21; 1	21; 6

==== Cook Islands vs Fiji ====
Cook Islands
2
Badminton North Harbour Centre - Court 1
10 February 2025, 15:00 UTC+13
Report

Fiji
3

			1	2	3
1	(Cook Islands) (Fiji)	Kaiyin Mataio; Liam Fong	18; 21	7; 21
2	(Cook Islands) (Fiji)	Te Pa Tupa; Leilah Chung	21; 10	21; 16
3	(Cook Islands) (Fiji)	Emanuela Mataio / Danny Simpson; Liam Fong / Chang Ho Kim	11; 21	11; 21
4	(Cook Islands) (Fiji)	Tuaine Nicholas-Herman / Lana To; Leilah Chung / Cindy Huang	18; 21	13; 21
5	(Cook Islands) (Fiji)	Kaiyin Mataio / Te Pa Tupa; Martin Feussner / Eileen Linda Shamim	21; 18	21; 17

==== Australia vs Tahiti ====
Australia
5
Badminton North Harbour Centre - Court 2
10 February 2025, 15:00 UTC+13
Report

Tahiti
0

			1	2	3
1	(Australia) (French Polynesia)	Jack Yu; Justin Tang	21; 9	21; 7
2	(Australia) (French Polynesia)	Tiffany Ho; Esther Tau	21; 6	21; 5
3	(Australia) (French Polynesia)	Huaidong Tang / Frederick Zhao; Antoine Beaubois / Yann Jeandroz	21; 8	21; 10
4	(Australia) (French Polynesia)	Kaitlyn Ea / Angela Yu; Méiissa Mi You / Myriam Siao	21; 8	21; 7
5	(Australia) (French Polynesia)	Ricky Tang / Gronya Somerville; Heiva Yvonet / May Gaymann	21; 7	21; 6

==== Australia vs Cook Islands ====
Australia
5
Badminton North Harbour Centre - Court 1
11 February 2025, 10:00 UTC+13
Report

Cook Islands
0

			1	2	3
1	(Australia) (Cook Islands)	Ricky Tang; Emanuela Mataio	21; 4	21; 7
2	(Australia) (Cook Islands)	Kaitlyn Ea; Te Pa Tupa	21; 6	21; 16
3	(Australia) (Cook Islands)	Ricky Tang / Jack Yu; Daniel Akavi / Kaiyin Mataio	21; 6	21; 6
4	(Australia) (Cook Islands)	Gronya Somerville / Angela Yu; Lana Toa / Te Pa Tupa	21; 4	21; 9
5	(Australia) (Cook Islands)	Frederick Zhao / Kaitlyn Ea; Daniel Akavi / Tuaine Nicholas-Herman	21; 4	21; 9

==== New Zealand vs Fiji ====
New Zealand
5
Badminton North Harbour Centre - Court 2
11 February 2025, 10:00 UTC+13
Report

Fiji
0

			1	2	3
1	(New Zealand) (Fiji)	Chris Benzie; Martin Feussner	21; 5	21; 7
2	(New Zealand) (Fiji)	Josephine Zhao; Leilah Chung	21; 9	21; 4
3	(New Zealand) (Fiji)	Raphael Chris Deloy / Dylan Soedjasa; Martin Feussner / Justin Tang	21; 5	21; 8
4	(New Zealand) (Fiji)	Yanxi Liu / Camellia Zhou; Leilah Chung / Eileen Linda Shamim	21; 3	21; 5
5	(New Zealand) (Fiji)	Edward Lau / Shaunna Li; Justin Tang / Cindy Huang	21; 6	21; 3

==== Tahiti vs Fiji ====
Tahiti
5
Badminton North Harbour Centre - Court 1
11 February 2025, 15:00 UTC+13
Report

Fiji
0

			1	2	3
1	(French Polynesia) (Fiji)	Antoine Beaubois / Esther Tau; Liam Fong / Cindy Huang	21; 7	21; 9
2	(French Polynesia) (Fiji)	Heirautea Curet; Leilah Chung	21; 9	21; 9
3	(French Polynesia) (Fiji)	Mike Mi You; Chang Ho Kim	21; 11	21; 17
4	(French Polynesia) (Fiji)	Méiissa Mi You / Myriam Siao; Leilah Chung / Cindy Huang	21; 5	21; 8
5	(French Polynesia) (Fiji)	Rémi Rossi / Heiva Yvonet; Liam Fong / Chang Ho Kim	21; 11	21; 15

==== New Zealand vs Cook Islands ====
New Zealand
5
Badminton North Harbour Centre - Court 2
11 February 2025, 15:00 UTC+13
Report

Cook Islands
0

			1	2	3
1	(New Zealand) (Cook Islands)	Dylan Soedjasa / Camellia Zhou; Daniel Akavi / Tuaine Nicholas-Herman	21; 6	21; 8
2	(New Zealand) (Cook Islands)	Jenny Zhu; Lana Toa	21; 10	21; 4
3	(New Zealand) (Cook Islands)	Raphael Chris Deloy / Adam Jeffrey; Emanuela Mataio / Kaiyin Mataio	21; 8	21; 10
4	(New Zealand) (Cook Islands)	Yanxi Liu / Josephine Zhao; Lana Toa / Te Pa Tupa	21; 13	21; 5
5	(New Zealand) (Cook Islands)	Raphael Chris Deloy; Daniel Akavi	21; 6	21; 5

==== Australia vs New Zealand ====
Australia
5
Badminton North Harbour Centre - Court 1
12 February 2025, 16:00 UTC+13
Report

New Zealand
0

			1	2	3
1	(Australia) (New Zealand)	Ricky Tang / Gronya Somerville; Edward Lau / Shaunna Li	21; 18	21; 15
2	(Australia) (New Zealand)	Jack Yu; Chris Benzie	21; 12	21; 12
3	(Australia) (New Zealand)	Tiffany Ho; Shaunna Li	21; 19	18; 21	21; 15
4	(Australia) (New Zealand)	Ricky Tang / Jack Yu; Raphael Chris Deloy / Dylan Soedjasa	12; 21	21; 14	21; 18
5	(Australia) (New Zealand)	Gronya Somerville / Angela Yu; Yanxi Liu / Camellia Zhou	21; 5	21; 4

==== Cook Islands vs Tahiti ====
Cook Islands
0
Badminton North Harbour Centre - Court 2
12 February 2025, 16:00 UTC+13
Report

Tahiti
5

			1	2	3
1	(Cook Islands) (French Polynesia)	Emanuela Mataio / Lana Toa; Yann Jeandroz / Méiissa Mi You	11; 21	15; 21
2	(Cook Islands) (French Polynesia)	Te Pa Tupa; Heirautea Curet	11; 21	9; 21
3	(Cook Islands) (French Polynesia)	Emanuela Mataio; Rémi Rossi	5; 21	8; 21
4	(Cook Islands) (French Polynesia)	Lana Toa / Te Pa Tupa; Heirautea Curet / Esther Tau	16; 21	12; 21
5	(Cook Islands) (French Polynesia)	Kaiyin Mataio / Danny Simpson; Antoine Beaubois / Rémi Rossi	6; 21	8; 21
