= Melinda Sun =

Australian badminton player (born 1995)

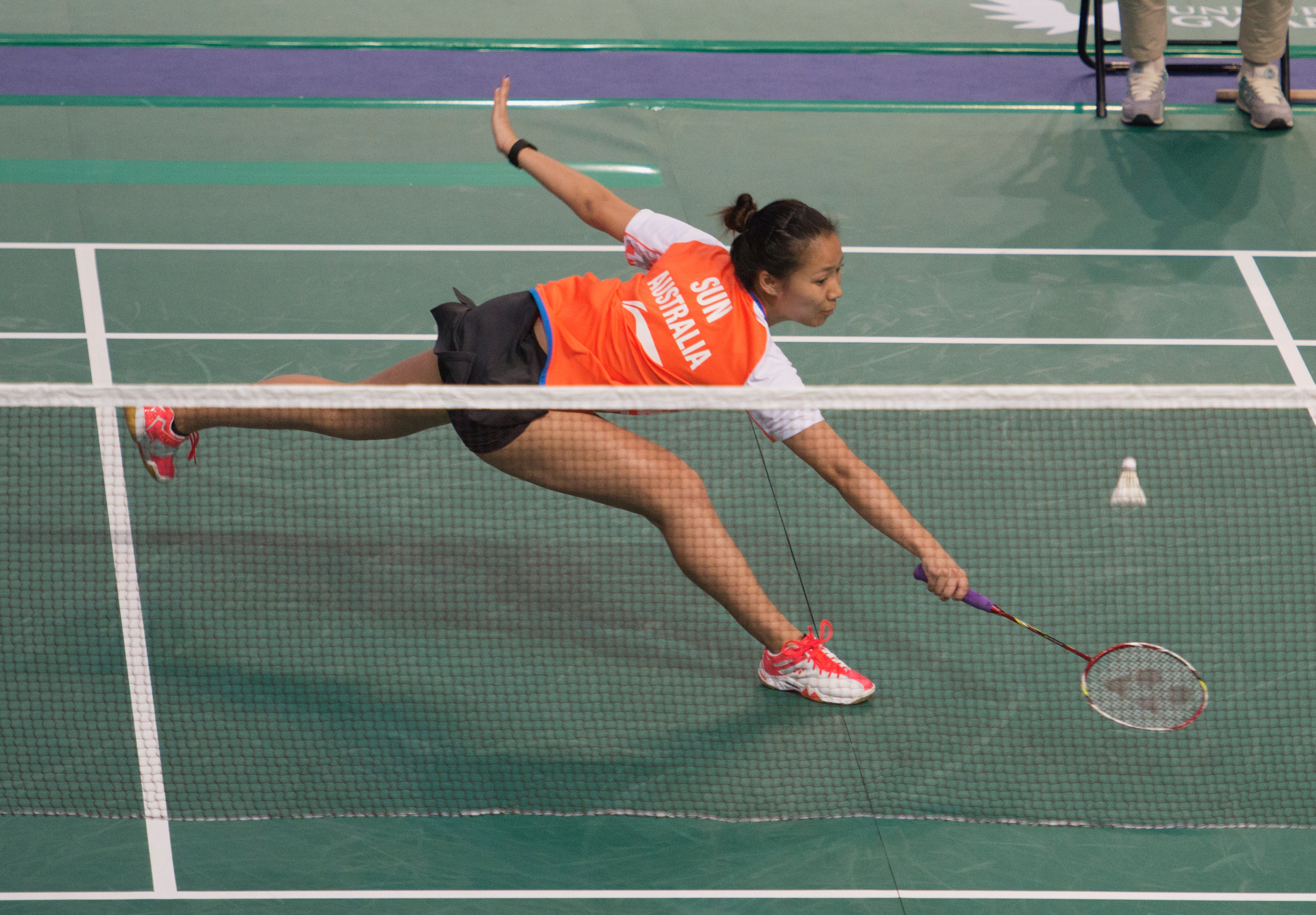

Personal information
- Born: 23 February 1995 (age 31)

Sport
- Country: Australia
- Sport: Badminton
- Handedness: Right

Women's singles & doubles
- Highest ranking: 86 (WS 13 Oct 2016); 166 (WD 22 Sep 2016); 196 (XD 12 Jun 2014)
- BWF profile
Medal record
Women's badminton
Representing Australia
Oceania Championships
Silver medal – second place	2016 Papeete	Women's doubles
Oceania Junior Championships
Bronze medal – third place	2013 Papeete	Mixed doubles

Melinda Sun (born 23 February 1995) is an Australian badminton player. In 2013, she won the bronze medal at the Oceania Junior Championships in the mixed doubles event partnered with Pit Seng Low. In 2016, she won the silver medal at the Oceania Championships in the women's doubles event partnered with Gronya Somerville.

== Achievements ==
=== Oceania Championships ===
Women's doubles

Year	Venue	Partner	Opponent	Score	Result
2016	Punaauia University Hall, Papeete, Tahiti	(Australia) Gronya Somerville	(Australia) Tiffany Ho (Australia) Jennifer Tam	17–21, 21–19, 20–22	Silver

=== Oceania Junior Championships ===
Mixed doubles

Year	Venue	Partner	Opponent	Score	Result
2013	University of French Polynesia Sports Hall, Papeete, Tahiti	(Australia) Pit Seng Low	(Australia) Anthony Joe (Australia) Joy Lai	4–21, 10–21	Bronze
