= Dylan Soedjasa =

New Zealand badminton player (born 1995)

Personal information
- Born: Dylan Alexander Soedjasa; 13 January 1995 (age 31) Takapuna, New Zealand
- Height: 1.73 m (5 ft 8 in)

Sport
- Country: New Zealand
- Sport: Badminton

Men's singles & doubles
- Highest ranking: 191 (MS 19 November 2016); 140 (MD 15 September 2016); 144 (XD 21 September 2017)
- BWF profile
Medal record
Men's badminton
Representing New Zealand
Oceania Championships
Gold medal – first place	2025 Auckland	Men's doubles
Silver medal – second place	2024 Geelong	Men's doubles
Silver medal – second place	2026 Auckland	Men's doubles
Bronze medal – third place	2020 Ballarat	Mixed doubles
Bronze medal – third place	2025 Auckland	Mixed doubles
Oceania Mixed Team Championships
Silver medal – second place	2016 Auckland	Mixed team
Silver medal – second place	2023 Auckland	Mixed team
Silver medal – second place	2025 Auckland	Mixed team
Oceania Men's Team Championships
Gold medal – first place	2016 Auckland	Men's team
Silver medal – second place	2020 Ballarat	Men's team
Silver medal – second place	2024 Geelong	Men's team
Silver medal – second place	2026 Auckland	Men's team
Oceania Junior Championships
Gold medal – first place	2013 Papeete	Boys' doubles
Silver medal – second place	2013 Papeete	Mixed team
Bronze medal – third place	2013 Papeete	Boys' singles

Dylan Alexander Soedjasa (born 13 January 1995) is a New Zealand badminton player. In 2013, he won silver medal at the Oceania Junior Badminton Championships in the mixed team event. In the individuals event, he won gold in the boys' doubles and bronze in the singles event. In 2016, he won the gold medal at the Oceania Championships in the men's team event. In 2017, he was the runner-up at the 2017 Nouméa International tournament in the men's singles and mixed doubles event partnered with Susannah Leydon-Davis.

== Achievements ==
=== Oceania Championships ===
Men's doubles
Year	Venue	Partner	Opponent	Score	Result
2024	Leisuretime Sports Precinct; Geelong, Australia	(New Zealand) Adam Jeffrey	(Australia) Lukas Defolky (Australia) Tang Huaidong	13–21, 17–21	Silver
2025	Badminton North Harbour Centre; Auckland, New Zealand	(New Zealand) Adam Jeffrey	(Australia) Tang Huaidong (Australia) Frederick Zhao	21–13, 21–10	Gold
2026	Badminton North Harbour Centre; Auckland, New Zealand	(New Zealand) Chris Benzie	(Australia) Rizky Hidayat (Australia) Jack Yu	14–21, 14–21	Silver

Mixed doubles
Year	Venue	Partner	Opponent	Score	Result
2020	Ken Kay Badminton Stadium; Ballarat, Australia	(New Zealand) Alyssa Tagle	(Australia) Pham Tran Hoang (Australia) Sylvina Kurniawan	13–21, 12–21	Bronze
2025	Badminton North Harbour Centre; Auckland, New Zealand	(New Zealand) Camellia Zhou	(New Zealand) Edward Lau (New Zealand) Shaunna Li	10–21, 11–21	Bronze

=== Oceania Junior Championships ===
Boys' singles
Year	Venue	Opponent	Score	Result
2013	University of French Polynesia Sports Hall; Papeete, Tahiti	(Australia) Daniel Guda	21–18, 11–21, 21–23	Bronze

Boys' doubles
Year	Venue	Partner	Opponent	Score	Result
2013	University of French Polynesia Sports Hall; Papeete, Tahiti	(New Zealand) Daniel Yin-Hai Lee	(French Polynesia) Antoine Beaubois (French Polynesia) Remi Rossi	21–12, 21–18	Gold

=== BWF International Challenge/Series (2 runners-up) ===
Men's singles
Year	Tournament	Opponent	Score	Result
2017	Nouméa International	(Australia) Ashwant Gobinathan	22–24, 15–21	(silver) Runner-up

Mixed doubles
Year	Tournament	Partner	Opponent	Score	Result
2017	Nouméa International	(New Zealand) Susannah Leydon-Davis	(Australia) Sawan Serasinghe (Australia) Setyana Mapasa	13–21, 21–15, 17–21	(silver) Runner-up

BWF International Challenge tournament
BWF International Series tournament
BWF Future Series tournament
