= 2024 Oceania Badminton Championships =

Tournament details
- Dates: 12–15 February
- Edition: 18th
- Venue: Leisuretime Sports Precinct
- Location: Geelong, Victoria, Australia

The 2024 Oceania Badminton Championships was a continental badminton championships in Oceania sanctioned by the Badminton World Federation. The tournament was held from 12 to 15 February 2024.

== Tournament ==
The 2024 Oceania Badminton Championships was the 18th event of the Oceania Championships, to crown the best male and female players and pairs in Oceania.

This tournament was organized by the Badminton Geelong and Badminton Oceania, with sanctioned of the Badminton World Federation.

=== Venue ===
The tournament was held at the Leisuretime Sports Precinct, Geelong, Victoria, Australia.

=== Point distribution ===
Below is the point distribution table for each phase of the tournament based on the BWF points system of the Oceania Badminton Championships, which is equivalent to a BWF International Challenge event.

Winner	Runner-up	3/4	5/8	9/16	17/32	33/64
4,000	3,400	2,800	2,200	1,520	920	360

=== Prize pool ===
Below the prize money for the individual event.

Event	Winner	Finalist	Semi-finals
Singles	AUD700	AUD400	AUD150
Doubles	AUD700	AUD400	AUD150

== Medal summary ==
=== Medalists ===
Event	Gold	Silver	Bronze
Men's singles	(New Zealand) Edward Lau	(Australia) Shrey Dhand	(Australia) Jacob Schueler
Men's singles	(New Zealand) Edward Lau	(Australia) Shrey Dhand	(Australia) Ricky Tang
Women's singles	(Australia) Tiffany Ho	(Australia) Yuelin Zhang	(New Zealand) Shaunna Li
Women's singles	(Australia) Tiffany Ho	(Australia) Yuelin Zhang	(Australia) Sydney Go
Men's doubles	(Australia) Lukas Defolky (Australia) Huaidong Tang	(New Zealand) Adam Jeffrey (New Zealand) Dylan Soedjasa	(New Zealand) Chris Benzie (New Zealand) Daniel Hu
Men's doubles	(Australia) Lukas Defolky (Australia) Huaidong Tang	(New Zealand) Adam Jeffrey (New Zealand) Dylan Soedjasa	(Australia) Ken Richardson (Australia) Ephraim Stephen Sam
Women's doubles	(Australia) Setyana Mapasa (Australia) Angela Yu	(Australia) Kaitlyn Ea (Australia) Gronya Somerville	(Australia) Dania Nugroho (Australia) Catrina Tan
Women's doubles	(Australia) Setyana Mapasa (Australia) Angela Yu	(Australia) Kaitlyn Ea (Australia) Gronya Somerville	(New Zealand) Erena Calder-Hawkings (New Zealand) Anona Pak
Mixed doubles	(Australia) Kenneth Choo (Australia) Gronya Somerville	(New Zealand) Edward Lau (New Zealand) Shaunna Li	(New Zealand) Vincent Tao (New Zealand) Alyssa Tagle
Mixed doubles	(Australia) Kenneth Choo (Australia) Gronya Somerville	(New Zealand) Edward Lau (New Zealand) Shaunna Li	(Australia) Rayne Wang (Australia) Kaitlyn Ea

=== Medal table ===
* Host nation (Australia)

Rank	Nation	Gold	Silver	Bronze	Total
1	Australia*	4	3	6	13
2	New Zealand	1	2	4	7
Totals (2 entries)		5	5	10	20

== Men's singles ==
=== Seeds ===
1. (Australia) Nathan Tang (fourth round)
2. (Australia) Jacob Schueler (semi-finals)
3. (New Zealand) Edward Lau (champion)
4. (Australia) Ricky Tang (semi-finals)
5. (Australia) Jack Yu (fourth round)
6. (Australia) Kai Teoh (quarter-finals)
7. (Australia) Keith Edison (quarter-finals)
8. (New Zealand) Ricky Cheng (quarter-finals)
9. (Australia) Ken Richardson (fourth round)
10. (Australia) Pit Seng Low (fourth round)
11. (New Zealand) Avinash Shastri (third round)
12. (New Zealand) Niccolo Tagle (second round)
13. (Australia) Rio Agustino (fourth round)
14. (Australia) Julian Lee (second round)
15. (Australia) Shrey Dhand (final)
16. (Australia) Jieying Chan (third round)

=== Finals ===
Semi-finals
15	(Australia) Shrey Dhand	21	21	21
4	(Australia) Ricky Tang	23	15	17
3	(New Zealand) Edward Lau	21	21
2	(Australia) Jacob Schueler	15	12

Final
15	(Australia) Shrey Dhand	15	15
3	(New Zealand) Edward Lau	21	21

== Women's singles ==
=== Seeds ===
1. (Australia) Tiffany Ho (champion)
2. (Australia) Bernice Teoh (quarter-finals)
3. (Australia) Louisa Ma (second round)
4. (Australia) Ying Tse (quarter-finals)
5. (New Zealand) Shaunna Li (semi-finals)
6. (Australia) Sydney Go (semi-finals)
7. (Australia) Sydney Tjonadi (quarter-finals)
8. (Australia) Yuelin Zhang (final)

=== Finals ===
Semi-finals
1	(Australia) Tiffany Ho	21	21
5	(New Zealand) Shaunna Li	18	11
6	(Australia) Sydney Go	21	10	11
8	(Australia) Yuelin Zhang	18	21	21

Final
1	(Australia) Tiffany Ho	22	21
8	(Australia) Yuelin Zhang	20	12

== Men's doubles ==
=== Seeds ===
1. (Australia) Shaurya Madaan / Ytharth Madaan (second round)
2. (New Zealand) Adam Jeffrey / Dylan Soedjasa (final)
3. (New Zealand) Jack Wang / Ryan Tong (second round)
4. (Australia) Asher Ooi / Timothy Sentosa (quarter-finals)
5. (Australia) Kai Teoh / Rayne Wang (second round)
6. (New Zealand) Dacmen Vong / Vincent Tao (second round)
7. (Australia) Lukas Defolky / Huaidong Tang (champion)
8. (Australia) Ken Goh / Emmanuel Stephen Sam (quarter-finals)

=== Finals ===
Semi-finals
(New Zealand) Chris Benzie (New Zealand) Daniel Hu	22	11
7	(Australia) Lukas Defolky (Australia) Huaidong Tang	24	21
(Australia) Ken Richardson (Australia) Ephraim Stephen Sam	19	19
2	(New Zealand) Adam Jeffrey (New Zealand) Dylan Soedjasa	21	21

Final
7	(Australia) Lukas Defolky (Australia) Huaidong Tang	21	21
2	(New Zealand) Adam Jeffrey (New Zealand) Dylan Soedjasa	13	17

== Women's doubles ==
=== Seeds ===
1. (Australia) Setyana Mapasa / Angela Yu (champion)
2. (Australia) Kaitlyn Ea / Gronya Somerville (final)
3. (New Zealand) Erena Calder-Hawkins / Anona Pak (semi-finals)
4. (Australia) Sydney Tjonadi / Victoria Tjonadi (second round)

=== Finals ===
Semi-finals
1	(Australia) Setyana Mapasa (Australia) Angela Yu	21	21
3	(New Zealand) Erena Calder-Hawkins (New Zealand) Anona Pak	7	13
(Australia) Dania Nugroho (Australia) Catrina Tan	12	17
2	(Australia) Kaitlyn Ea (Australia) Gronya Somerville	21	21

Final
1	(Australia) Setyana Mapasa (Australia) Angela Yu	21	21
2	(Australia) Kaitlyn Ea (Australia) Gronya Somerville	18	11

== Mixed doubles ==
=== Seeds ===
1. (Australia) Kenneth Choo / Gronya Somerville (champions)
2. (New Zealand) Edward Lau / Shaunna Li (final)
3. (New Zealand) Adam Jeffrey / Justine Villegas (third round)
4. (New Zealand) Dacmen Vong / Roanne Apalisok (quarter-finals)
5. (Australia) Felix Wang / Lee Yen Kho (second round)
6. (Australia) Rayne Wang / Kaitlyn Ea (semi-finals)
7. (New Zealand) Daxxon Vong / Gaea Galvez (second round)
8. (Australia) Hoe Keat Oon / Xin Yi Gu (second round)

=== Finals ===
Semi-finals
1	(Australia) Kenneth Choo (Australia) Gronya Somerville	21	21
(New Zealand) Vincent Tao (New Zealand) Alyssa Tagle	8	15
6	(Australia) Rayne Wang (Australia) Kaitlyn Ea	16	21	28
2	(New Zealand) Edward Lau (New Zealand) Shaunna Li	21	12	30

Final
1	(Australia) Kenneth Choo (Australia) Gronya Somerville	21	25	21
2	(New Zealand) Edward Lau (New Zealand) Shaunna Li	11	27	14
