= Oceania Junior Badminton Championships =

Badminton championships

The Oceania Junior Badminton Championships is a tournament organized by the Badminton Oceania (BO) since 2010, and is held once every two years to crown the best junior badminton players in Oceania. Team events were added to the program since the 2011 edition in Suva, Fiji.

== Championships ==
Year	Number	Host City	Host Country	Events
2010	1	Invercargill	New Zealand	5
2011	2	Suva	Fiji	6
2013	3	Tahiti	Tahiti	6
2015	4	North Harbour	New Zealand	6
2017	5	Nouméa	New Caledonia	6
2019	6	Melbourne	Australia	6
2023	7	Auckland	New Zealand	6
2025	8	Saipan	Northern Mariana Islands	6

== Past winners ==
=== Individual competition ===
Year	Men's singles	Women's singles	Men's doubles	Women's doubles	Mixed doubles
2010	(Australia) Boris Ma	(Australia) Tara Pilven	(Australia) Boris Ma (Australia) Ashwant Gobinathan	(New Zealand) Mary O'Connor (New Zealand) Madeleine Stapleton	(New Zealand) Luke Charlesworth (New Zealand) Mary O'Connor
2011	(Australia) Sawan Serasinghe	(Australia) Tara Pilven	(Australia) Matthew Chau (Australia) Sawan Serasinghe	(New Zealand) Victoria Cheng (New Zealand) Mary O'Connor	(New Zealand) Maika Phillips (New Zealand) Mary O'Connor
2013	(Australia) Daniel Guda	(Australia) Joy Lai	(New Zealand) Dylan Soedjasa (New Zealand) Daniel Lee	(New Zealand) Kaitlyn McLeod (New Zealand) Rayna Phillips	(Australia) Anthony Joe (Australia) Joy Lai
2015	(New Zealand) Oscar Guo	(Australia) Alice Wu	(New Zealand) Nicco Tagle (New Zealand) Daxxon Vong	(Australia) Lee Yen Khoo (Australia) Alice Wu	(Australia) Huaidong Tang (Australia) Lee Yen Khoo
2017	(New Zealand) Oscar Guo	(New Zealand) Sally Fu	(New Zealand) Oscar Guo (New Zealand) Dacmen Vong	(New Zealand) Sally Fu (New Zealand) Tamara Otene	(New Zealand) Edward Lau (New Zealand) Christine Zhang
2019	(New Zealand) Edward Lau	(New Zealand) Shaunna Li	(New Zealand) Ryan Tong (New Zealand) Jack Wang	(Australia) Kaitlyn Ea (Australia) Angela Yu	(Australia) Jack Yu (Australia) Angela Yu
2023	(Australia) Jie Ying Chan	(Australia) Isabella Yan	(Australia) Jordan Yang (Australia) Frederick Zhao	(Australia) Dania Nugroho (Australia) Catrina Chia-Yu Tan	(Australia) Jordan Yang (Australia) Sydney Tjonadi
2025	(Australia) Shrey Dhand	(Australia) Faye Huo	(New Zealand) Raphael Chris Deloy (New Zealand) Lezhi Zhu	(Australia) Mimi Ngo (Australia) Maureen Clarissa Wijaya	(Australia) Jayden Lim (Australia) Victoria Tjonadi

=== Team competition ===
The mixed team event is held since 2011.

Year	Winners
2011	New Zealand
2013	Australia
2015	Australia
2017	New Zealand
2019	Australia
2023	Australia
2025	Australia

== See also ==
- Oceania Badminton Championships
