= Angela Yu (badminton) =

Australian badminton player (born 2003)

Angela Yu 于亚杰
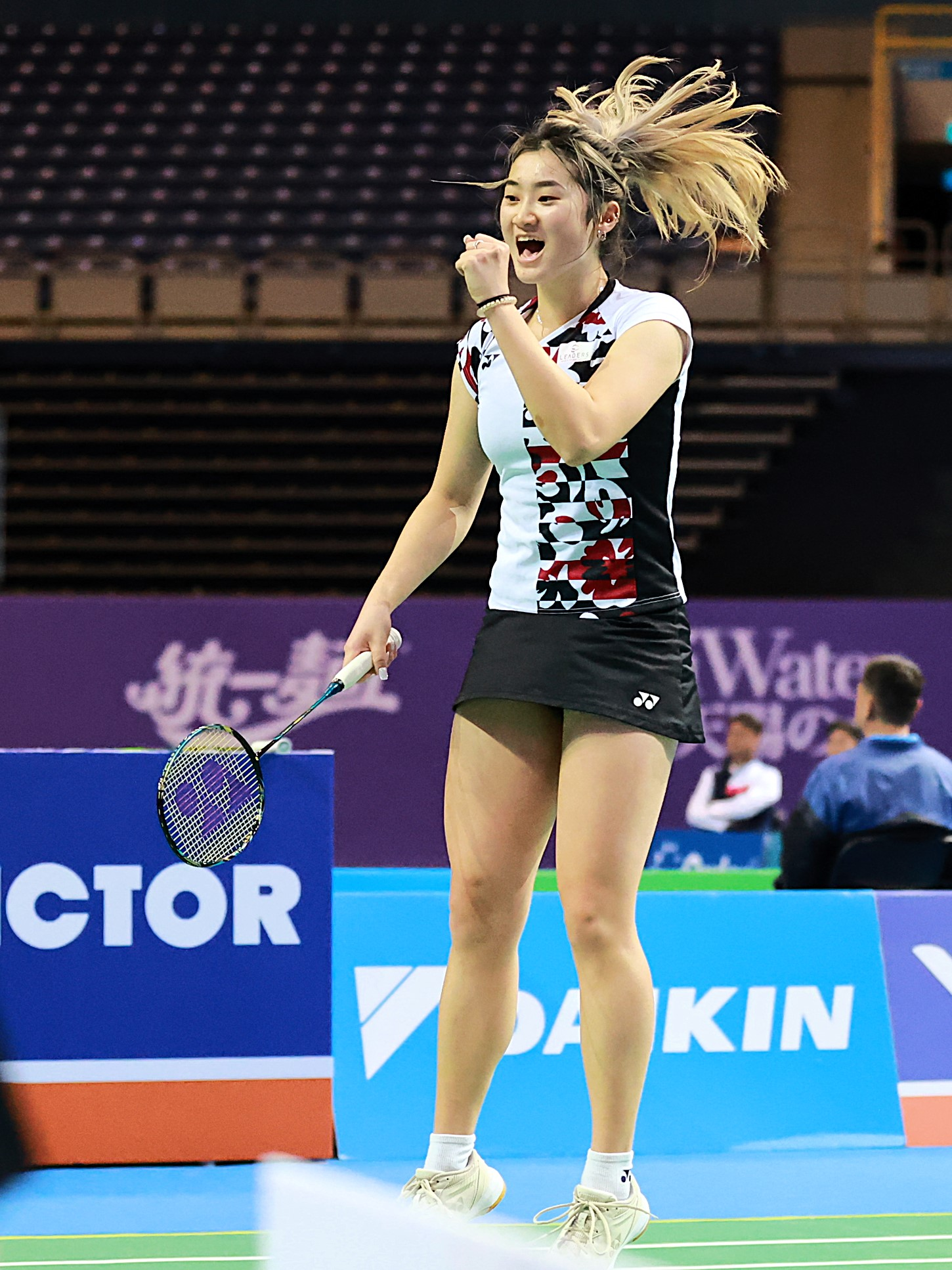
- Yu at the 2023 Kaohsiung Masters

Personal information
- Born: 8 March 2003 (age 23) Box Hill, Victoria, Australia
- Height: 1.74 m (5 ft 9 in)

Sport
- Country: Australia
- Sport: Badminton
- Handedness: Right

Women's doubles
- Highest ranking: 17 (with Setyana Mapasa, 26 November 2024)
- Current ranking: 56 (with Gronya Somerville, 30 June 2026)
- BWF profile
Medal record
Women's badminton
Representing Australia
Oceania Championships
| Gold medal – first place | 2024 Geelong | Women's doubles |
| Gold medal – first place | 2025 Auckland | Women's doubles |
| Gold medal – first place | 2026 Auckland | Women's doubles |
| Gold medal – first place | 2026 Auckland | Mixed doubles |
| Bronze medal – third place | 2022 Melbourne | Mixed doubles |
Oceania Mixed Team Championships
| Gold medal – first place | 2025 Auckland | Mixed team |
Oceania Women's Team Championships
| Gold medal – first place | 2020 Ballarat | Women's team |
| Gold medal – first place | 2024 Geelong | Women's team |
| Gold medal – first place | 2026 Auckland | Women's team |
Oceania Junior Championships
| Gold medal – first place | 2019 Melbourne | Women's doubles |
| Gold medal – first place | 2019 Melbourne | Mixed doubles |
| Gold medal – first place | 2019 Melbourne | Mixed team |
| Bronze medal – third place | 2019 Melbourne | Women's singles |

Angela Yu
- Traditional Chinese: 于亞傑
- Simplified Chinese: 于亚杰
Transcriptions
Standard Mandarin
- Hanyu Pinyin: Yú Yàjié

Angela Yu (born 8 March 2003) is an Australian badminton player. She won a gold medal in women's doubles at the 2024 Oceania Badminton Championships. She represented Australia in women's doubles at the 2024 Summer Olympics.

== Biography ==
Angela was born in Box Hill, Melbourne to former Chinese badminton players Tang Yongshu and Yu Qi. Her brother, Jack Yu is also a badminton player and is part of the Australia national team.

== Career ==
In 2023, Angela partnered with Setyana Mapasa. She won her first World Tour title with Setyana at the 2023 Kaohsiung Masters. The duo then won the Bendigo International and the Sydney International. In 2024, Angela and Setyana reached the semi-finals of the 2024 Swiss Open but lost to Hsu Ya-ching and Lin Wan-ching. Angela and Setyana also reached the semi-finals of the 2024 Australian Open and became the first Australians to reach the women's doubles semi-finals at the home tournament since 2009.

The duo earned enough ranking points to qualify for the 2024 Summer Olympics women's doubles event. Although they did not proceed to the knockout stages, they did win against Tanisha Crasto and Ashwini Ponnappa in the group stage to salvage a point and place third in the group.

== Achievements ==
=== Oceania Championships ===
Women's doubles
| Year | Venue | Partner | Opponent | Score | Result |
|---|---|---|---|---|---|
| 2024 | Leisuretime Sports Precinct, Geelong, Australia | (Australia) Setyana Mapasa | (Australia) Kaitlyn Ea (Australia) Gronya Somerville | 21–18, 21–11 | Gold |
| 2025 | Badminton North Harbour Centre, Auckland, New Zealand | (Australia) Gronya Somerville | (Australia) Mimi Ngo (Australia) Maureen Clarissa Wijaya | 21–10, 21–12 | Gold |
| 2026 | Badminton North Harbour Centre, Auckland, New Zealand | (Australia) Gronya Somerville | (New Zealand) Berry Ng (New Zealand) Amanda Ting | 21–9, 21–9 | Gold |

Mixed doubles
| Year | Venue | Partner | Opponent | Score | Result |
|---|---|---|---|---|---|
| 2022 | Melbourne Sports and Aquatic Centre, Melbourne, Australia | (Australia) Mitchell Wheller | (New Zealand) Oliver Leydon-Davis (New Zealand) Anona Pak | 9–21, 21–23 | Bronze |
| 2026 | Badminton North Harbour Centre, Auckland, New Zealand | (Australia) Andika Ramadiansyah | (New Zealand) Ricky Cheng (New Zealand) Natalie Ting | 21–13, 21–16 | Gold |

=== Oceania Junior Championships ===
Girls' singles
| Year | Venue | Opponent | Score | Result |
|---|---|---|---|---|
| 2019 | Melbourne Sports and Aquatic Centre, Melbourne, Australia | (New Zealand) Shaunna Li | 16–21, 15–21 | Bronze |

Girls' doubles
| Year | Venue | Partner | Opponent | Score | Result |
|---|---|---|---|---|---|
| 2019 | Melbourne Sports and Aquatic Centre; Melbourne, Australia | (Australia) Kaitlyn Ea | (Australia) Majan Almazan (Australia) Kelly Xu | 15–21, 21–13, 21–16 | Gold |

Mixed doubles
| Year | Venue | Partner | Opponent | Score | Result |
|---|---|---|---|---|---|
| 2019 | Melbourne Sports and Aquatic Centre; Melbourne, Australia | (Australia) Jack Yu | (New Zealand) Edward Lau (New Zealand) Shaunna Li | 21–17, 19–21, 21–16 | Gold |

=== BWF World Tour (1 title) ===
The BWF World Tour, which was announced on 19 March 2017 and implemented in 2018, is a series of elite badminton tournaments sanctioned by the Badminton World Federation (BWF). The BWF World Tour is divided into levels of World Tour Finals, Super 1000, Super 750, Super 500, Super 300 (part of the HSBC World Tour), and the BWF Tour Super 100.

Women's doubles
| Year | Tournament | Level | Partner | Opponent | Score | Result |
|---|---|---|---|---|---|---|
| 2023 | Kaohsiung Masters | Super 100 | (Australia) Setyana Mapasa | (Japan) Maiko Kawazoe (Japan) Haruna Konishi | 21–19, 8–21, 21–19 | (gold) Winner |

=== BWF International Challenge/Series (2 titles, 3 runners-up) ===
Women's doubles
| Year | Tournament | Partner | Opponent | Score | Result |
|---|---|---|---|---|---|
| 2023 | Mongolia International | (Australia) Setyana Mapasa | (Hong Kong) Lui Lok Lok (Hong Kong) Ng Wing Yung | 16–21, 18–21 | (silver) Runner-up |
| 2023 | Bendigo International | (Australia) Setyana Mapasa | (Chinese Taipei) Hsu Yin-hui (Chinese Taipei) Lin Jhih-yun | 18–21, 22–20, 27–25 | (gold) Winner |
| 2023 | Sydney International | (Australia) Setyana Mapasa | (Australia) Sylvina Kurniawan (Australia) Poon Lok Yan | 21–16, 21–18 | (gold) Winner |
| 2025 | Polish Open | (Australia) Gronya Somerville | (United States) Lauren Lam (United States) Allison Lee | 21–19, 15–21, 15–21 | (silver) Runner-up |
| 2025 | Sydney International | (Australia) Gronya Somerville | (Chinese Taipei) Chen Su-yu (Chinese Taipei) Hsieh Yi-en | 15–8, 13–15, 9–15 | (silver) Runner-up |

BWF International Challenge tournament
BWF International Series tournament
