= Sylvina Kurniawan =

Indonesian-Australian badminton player (born 1988)

Sylvinna Kurniawan
Personal information
- Born: 5 May 1988 (age 38) Surabaya, East Java, Indonesia

Sport
- Country: Indonesia (2004–2015); Australia (2016–present)
- Sport: Badminton
- Handedness: Right

Women's singles & doubles
- Highest ranking: 239 (WS 29 September 2016); 217 (WD 4 October 2012); 196 (XD 18 February 2020)
- BWF profile
Medal record
Women's badminton
Representing Australia
Oceania Championships
Gold medal – first place	2022 Melbourne	Women's doubles
Gold medal – first place	2023 Auckland	Women's doubles
Silver medal – second place	2020 Ballarat	Mixed doubles
Silver medal – second place	2023 Auckland	Mixed doubles
Bronze medal – third place	2020 Ballarat	Women's singles
Oceania Women's Team Championships
Gold medal – first place	2020 Ballarat	Women's team

Sylvinna Kurniawan (born 5 May 1988) is an Indonesian-born badminton player, and now representing Australia. She was part of Australia team that won the women's team title at the 2020 Oceania Championships.

== Achievements ==
=== Oceania Championships ===
Women's singles
Year	Venue	Opponent	Score	Result
2020	Ken Kay Badminton Stadium, Ballarat, Australia	(Australia) Chen Hsuan-yu	11–21, 5–21	Bronze

Women's doubles
Year	Venue	Partner	Opponent	Score	Result
2022	Melbourne Sports and Aquatic Centre; Melbourne, Australia	(Australia) Joyce Choong	(Australia) Kaitlyn Ea (Australia) Gronya Somerville	21–19, 21–15	Gold
2023	Auckland Badminton Stadium; Auckland, New Zealand	(Australia) Setyana Mapasa	(Australia) Tiffany Ho (Australia) Khoo Lee Yen	21–7, 21–9	Gold

Mixed doubles
Year	Venue	Partner	Opponent	Score	Result
2020	Ken Kay Badminton Stadium; Ballarat, Australia	(Australia) Pham Tran Hoang	(Australia) Simon Leung (Australia) Gronya Somerville	12–21, 8–21	Silver
2023	Auckland Badminton Stadium; Auckland, New Zealand	(Australia) Lim Ming Chuen	(Australia) Kenneth Choo (Australia) Gronya Somerville	12–21, 16–21	Silver

=== BWF International Challenge/Series (4 runners-up) ===
Women's doubles
Year	Tournament	Partner	Opponent	Score	Result
2014	Sydney International	(Australia) Susan Wang	(Japan) Yuki Fukushima (Japan) Sayaka Hirota	5–11, 5–11, 2–11	(silver) Runner-up
2017	Sydney International	(Australia) Chen Hsuan-yu	(Chinese Taipei) Hung En-tzu (Chinese Taipei) Lin Jhih-yun	19–21, 19–21	(silver) Runner-up
2023	Sydney International	(Australia) Poon Lok Yan	(Australia) Setyana Mapasa (Australia) Angela Yu	16–21, 18–21	(silver) Runner-up

Mixed doubles
Year	Tournament	Partner	Opponent	Score	Result
2014	Sydney International	(Australia) Pham Tran Hoang	(Australia) Sawan Serasinghe (Australia) Setyana Mapasa	4–11, 8–11, 3–11	(silver) Runner-up

BWF International Challenge tournament
BWF International Series tournament
BWF Future Series tournament
