= Setyana Mapasa =

Indonesian-Australian badminton player (born 1995)

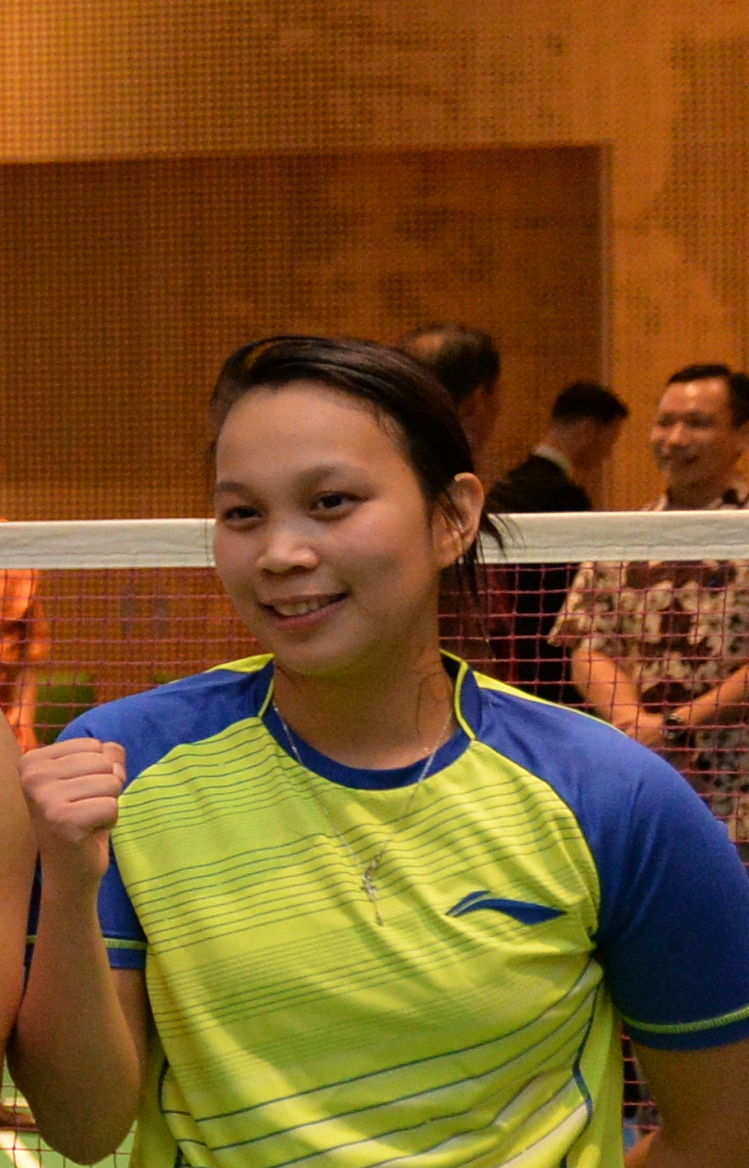
- Mapasa in 2016

Personal information
- Born: Setyana Daniella Florensia Mapasa; 15 August 1995 (age 31) Kawangkoan, Minahasa, Indonesia
- Height: 1.66 m (5 ft 5 in)
- Weight: 60 kg (132 lb)

Sport
- Country: Indonesia (until 2013); Australia (2014–present)
- Sport: Badminton
- Handedness: Left

Women's & mixed doubles
- Highest ranking: 17 (WD with Angela Yu, 26 November 2024); 18 (WD with Gronya Somerville, 23 February 2017); 32 (XD with Sawan Serasinghe, 28 September 2017)
- BWF profile
Medal record
Women's badminton
Representing Australia
Oceania Championships
Gold medal – first place	2017 Nouméa	Women's doubles
Gold medal – first place	2017 Nouméa	Mixed doubles
Gold medal – first place	2018 Hamilton	Women's doubles
Gold medal – first place	2018 Hamilton	Mixed doubles
Gold medal – first place	2019 Melbourne	Women's doubles
Gold medal – first place	2020 Ballarat	Women's doubles
Gold medal – first place	2023 Auckland	Women's doubles
Gold medal – first place	2024 Geelong	Women's doubles
Bronze medal – third place	2019 Melbourne	Mixed doubles
Oceania Mixed Team Championships
Gold medal – first place	2019 Melbourne	Mixed team
Oceania Women's Team Championships
Gold medal – first place	2018 Hamilton	Women's team
Gold medal – first place	2020 Ballarat	Women's team
Gold medal – first place	2024 Geelong	Women's team
Representing Indonesia
World Junior Championships
Silver medal – second place	2013 Bangkok	Mixed team
Asian Junior Championships
Bronze medal – third place	2013 Kota Kinabalu	Mixed team

Setyana Daniella Florensia Mapasa (born 15 August 1995) is an Indonesian-born Australian badminton player. Mapasa won a silver medal at the 2013 BWF World Junior Championships mixed team when she represented Indonesia. She officially became an Australian citizen in 2014. She was selected to join the national team compete at the 2018 Commonwealth Games in Gold Coast, Australia. She was four times women's doubles Oceania champions from 2017 to 2020 with her partner Gronya Somerville, also two times champion in the mixed doubles event in 2017 and 2018 alongside Sawan Serasinghe.

Mapasa represented Australia at the 2020 Summer Olympics. She played in badminton women's doubles with her partner, Gronya Somerville, winning one and losing the other. They finished third in their group and were therefore eliminated. She also competed for Australia at the 2024 Summer Olympics.

== Early years ==
Setyana Mapasa, living in Indonesia, started playing badminton when she was 8-years-old. Badminton is a big part of the Indonesian culture and her parents played socially. Mapasa is a left handed player and turned professional at the age of 13. She made her international debut in 2013.

== Achievements ==
=== Oceania Championships ===
Women's doubles
Year	Venue	Partner	Opponent	Score	Result
2017	Salle Anewy; Nouméa, New Caledonia	(Australia) Gronya Somerville	(Australia) Tiffany Ho (Australia) Joy Lai	16–21, 21–18, 21–14	Gold
2018	Eastlink Badminton Stadium; Hamilton, New Zealand	(Australia) Gronya Somerville	(Australia) Leanne Choo (Australia) Renuga Veeran	21–14, 22–20	Gold
2019	Melbourne Sports and Aquatic Centre; Melbourne, Australia	(Australia) Gronya Somerville	(Australia) Yingzi Jiang (Australia) Louisa Ma	21–10, 21–9	Gold
2020	Ken Kay Badminton Stadium; Ballarat, Australia	(Australia) Gronya Somerville	(New Zealand) Sally Fu (New Zealand) Alyssa Tagle	21–9, 21–10	Gold
2023	Auckland Badminton Stadium; Auckland, New Zealand	(Australia) Sylvina Kurniawan	(Australia) Tiffany Ho (Australia) Khoo Lee Yen	21–7, 21–9	Gold
2024	Leisuretime Sports Precinct; Geelong, Australia	(Australia) Angela Yu	(Australia) Kaitlyn Ea (Australia) Gronya Somerville	21–18, 21–11	Gold

Mixed doubles
Year	Venue	Partner	Opponent	Score	Result
2017	Salle Anewy; Nouméa, New Caledonia	(Australia) Sawan Serasinghe	(Australia) Joel Findlay (Australia) Gronya Somerville	21–19, 21–9	Gold
2018	Eastlink Badminton Stadium; Hamilton, New Zealand	(Australia) Sawan Serasinghe	(Australia) Matthew Chau (Australia) Leanne Choo	21–19, 21–18	Gold
2019	Melbourne Sports and Aquatic Centre; Melbourne, Australia	(Australia) Huaidong Tang	(Australia) Simon Leung (Australia) Gronya Somerville	12–21, 6–21	Bronze

=== BWF World Tour (2 titles) ===
The BWF World Tour, which was announced on 19 March 2017 and implemented in 2018, is a series of elite badminton tournaments sanctioned by the Badminton World Federation (BWF). The BWF World Tour is divided into levels of World Tour Finals, Super 1000, Super 750, Super 500, Super 300 (part of the HSBC World Tour), and the BWF Tour Super 100.

Women's doubles
Year	Tournament	Level	Partner	Opponent	Score	Result
2019	Canada Open	Super 100	(Australia) Gronya Somerville	(South Korea) Chang Ye-na (South Korea) Kim Hye-rin	21–16, 21–14	(gold) Winner
2023	Kaohsiung Masters	Super 100	(Australia) Angela Yu	(Japan) Maiko Kawazoe (Japan) Haruna Konishi	21–19, 8–21, 21–19	(gold) Winner

=== BWF Grand Prix (2 titles, 1 runner-up) ===
The BWF Grand Prix had two levels, the Grand Prix and Grand Prix Gold. It was a series of badminton tournaments sanctioned by the Badminton World Federation (BWF) and played between 2007 and 2017.

Women's doubles
Year	Tournament	Partner	Opponent	Score	Result
2016	Canada Open	(Australia) Gronya Somerville	(England) Heather Olver (England) Lauren Smith	21–15, 21–16	(gold) Winner
2016	Dutch Open	(Australia) Gronya Somerville	(Bulgaria) Gabriela Stoeva (Bulgaria) Stefani Stoeva	17–21, 21–17, 21–16	(gold) Winner

Mixed doubles
Year	Tournament	Partner	Opponent	Score	Result
2017	New Zealand Open	(Australia) Sawan Serasinghe	(Indonesia) Ronald Alexander (Indonesia) Annisa Saufika	19–21, 14–21	(silver) Runner-up

BWF Grand Prix Gold tournament
BWF Grand Prix tournament

=== BWF International Challenge/Series (13 titles, 8 runners-up) ===
Women's doubles
Year	Tournament	Partner	Opponent	Score	Result
2014	Maribyrnong International	(Chinese Taipei) Chiang Ying-li	(Australia) He Tian Tang (Australia) Renuga Veeran	19–21, 23–25	(silver) Runner-up
2015	Waikato International	(Australia) Gronya Somerville	(Australia) Ruwindi Serasinghe (Australia) Alice Wu	21–13, 21–10	(gold) Winner
2015	Auckland International	(Australia) Gronya Somerville	(Chinese Taipei) Pan Tzu-chin (Chinese Taipei) Tsai Hsin-yu	21–9, 21–5	(gold) Winner
2015	Maribyrnong International	(Australia) Gronya Somerville	(Australia) Chen Hsuan-yu (Chinese Taipei) Shu Yu-lin	20–22, 17–21, 21–18	(gold) Winner
2015	Sydney International	(Australia) Gronya Somerville	(Thailand) Jongkongphan Kittiharakul (Thailand) Rawinda Prajongjai	13–21, 5–21	(silver) Runner-up
2015	Norwegian International	(Australia) Gronya Somerville	(Denmark) Amanda Madsen (Denmark) Isabella Nielsen	21–5, 21–13	(gold) Winner
2015	Italian International	(Australia) Gronya Somerville	(Bulgaria) Gabriela Stoeva (Bulgaria) Stefani Stoeva	19–21, 21–18, 6–13 Retired	(silver) Runner-up
2016	Brazil International	(Australia) Gronya Somerville	(Japan) Chisato Hoshi (Japan) Naru Shinoya	13–21, 19–21	(silver) Runner-up
2017	Nouméa International	(Australia) Gronya Somerville	(Australia) Tiffany Ho (Australia) Joy Lai	21–11, 21–8	(gold) Winner
2019	South Australia International	(Australia) Gronya Somerville	(Japan) Rin Iwanaga (Japan) Kie Nakanishi	15–21, 21–19, 9–21	(silver) Runner-up
2019	Nepal International	(Australia) Gronya Somerville	(India) K. Maneesha (India) Rutaparna Panda	21–10, 18–21, 21–11	(gold) Winner
2019	Yonex / K&D Graphics International	(Australia) Gronya Somerville	(Canada) Rachel Honderich (Canada) Kristen Tsai	14–21, 21–9, 21–18	(gold) Winner
2023	Mongolia International	(Australia) Angela Yu	(Hong Kong) Lui Lok Lok (Hong Kong) Ng Wing Yung	16–21, 18–21	(silver) Runner-up
2023	Bendigo International	(Australia) Angela Yu	(Chinese Taipei) Hsu Yin-hui (Chinese Taipei) Lin Jhih-yun	18–21, 22–20, 27–25	(gold) Winner
2023	Sydney International	(Australia) Angela Yu	(Australia) Sylvina Kurniawan (Australia) Poon Lok Yan	21–16, 21–18	(gold) Winner

Mixed doubles
Year	Tournament	Partner	Opponent	Score	Result
2014	Sydney International	(Australia) Sawan Serasinghe	(Australia) Pham Tran Hoang (Indonesia) Sylvina Kurniawan	11–4, 11–8, 11–3	(gold) Winner
2015	Waikato International	(Australia) Sawan Serasinghe	(Australia) Matthew Chau (Australia) Gronya Somerville	21–13, 21–17	(gold) Winner
2015	Maribyrnong International	(Australia) Sawan Serasinghe	(Australia) Robin Middleton (Australia) Leanne Choo	21–17, 19–21, 19–21	(silver) Runner-up
2015	Norwegian International	(Australia) Sawan Serasinghe	(Denmark) Soren Gravholt (Denmark) Maiken Fruergaard	21–17, 21–15	(gold) Winner
2017	Nouméa International	(Australia) Sawan Serasinghe	(New Zealand) Dylan Soedjasa (New Zealand) Susannah Leydon-Davis	21–13, 15–21, 21–17	(gold) Winner
2017	Sydney International	(Australia) Sawan Serasinghe	(Chinese Taipei) Ye Hong-wei (Chinese Taipei) Teng Chun-hsun	Walkover	(silver) Runner-up

BWF International Challenge tournament
BWF International Series tournament
BWF Future Series tournament

=== BWF Junior International (1 title, 2 runners-up) ===
Girls' singles
Year	Tournament	Opponent	Score	Result	Ref.
2012	Australian Junior International	(Philippines) Malvinne Alcala	20–22, 10–21	(silver) Runner-up	
2012	Indonesia Junior International	(Indonesia) Hanna Ramadini	21–16, 19–21, 21–19	(gold) Winner	

Girls' doubles
Year	Tournament	Partner	Opponent	Score	Result
2013	Indonesia Junior International	(Indonesia) Rosyita Eka Putri Sari	(Indonesia) Uswatun Khasanah (Indonesia) Masita Mahmudin	21–23, 21–16, 15–21	(silver) Runner-up

BWF Junior International Challenge tournament
BWF Junior Future Series tournament

== Performance timeline ==
Key

W	Won	F	Finalist	SF	Semi-finalist
QF	Quarter-finalist	#R	Rounds 4, 3, 2, 1	RR	Round-robin stage
Q#	Qualification round	A	Absent	w/d	Withdrew
G	Gold	S	Silver	B	Bronze
NH	Not held	N/A	Not applicable	DNQ	Did not qualify

=== National team ===
- Junior level

Team events	2012	2013
Asian Junior Championships	QF	B
World Junior Championships	4th	S

- Senior level

Team events	2017	2018	2019	2020
Oceania Women's Team Championships	NH	G	NH	G
Oceania Mixed Team Championships	NH		G	NH
Commonwealth Games	NH	QF	NH	
Sudirman Cup	15th	NH	24th	NH

=== Individual competitions ===
- Junior level

Events	2012	2013
Asian Junior Championships	3R (GS)	3R (GD); 2R (XD)
World Junior Championships	2R (GS)	QF (GD); 1R (XD)

- Senior level

Events	2017	2018	2019	2020
Oceania Championships	G (WD); G (XD)	G (WD); G (XD)	G (WD); B (XD)	G (WD)
Commonwealth Games	NH	4th (WD); QF (XD)	NH	
World Championships	w/d (WD) w/d (XD)	A	2R (WD)	NH
Olympic Games	NH			RR (WD)

Tournament	BWF Superseries / Grand Prix					BWF World Tour			Best
Tournament	2013	2014	2015	2016	2017	2018	2019	2020	Best
Thailand Masters	NH			A		QF (WD); QF (XD)	w/d	1R	QF ('18)
All England Open	A					1R (WD)	A		1R ('18)
Malaysia Masters	A					1R (WD) w/d (XD)	1R	1R	1R ('18, '19, '20)
New Zealand Open	A	2R (WD); 2R (XD)	QF (WD); 1R (XD)	SF (WD); 2R (XD)	w/d (WD); F (XD)	A	1R	NH	F ('17)
Australian Open	A		Q2 (WD); 1R (XD)	1R (WD); 1R (XD)	1R (WD); 1R (XD)	A	1R	NH	1R ('15, '16, '17, '19)
Malaysia Open	A						2R	NH	2R ('19)
Singapore Open	A				1R (WD); 1R (XD)	A	2R	NH	2R ('19)
Korea Masters	A				w/d (WD)	A	2R	NH	2R ('19)
Indonesia Masters	2R (WD); Q1 (XD)	A			NH	A		1R	2R ('13)
Indonesia Open	A			2R (WD); 1R (XD)	1R (WD)	A	1R	NH	2R ('16)
Thailand Open	A	NH	A		QF (WD)	A		1R	QF ('17)
Thailand Open	A	NH	A		QF (WD)	A		2R	QF ('17)
Canada Open	A		2R (WD); 1R (XD)	W (WD); SF (XD)	w/d (WD); 2R (XD)	A	W	NH	W ('16, '19)
Chinese Taipei Open	A				w/d (WD)	A	1R	NH	1R ('19)
U.S. Open	A			QF (WD); 1R (XD)	w/d (WD); 2R (XD)	A	2R	NH	QF ('16)
Hyderabad Open	NH					A	w/d	NH	–
China Open	A				QF (WD)	A	2R	NH	QF ('17)
Dutch Open	A			W (WD)	A			NH	W ('16)
Denmark Open	A			1R (WD)	A				1R ('16)
Macau Open	A				1R (WD)	A	2R	NH	2R ('19)
Fuzhou China Open	A						1R	NH	1R ('19)
Hong Kong Open	A				2R (WD); 1R (XD)	A		NH	2R ('17)
Scottish Open	A		2R (WD) w/d (XD)	1R (WD); 1R (XD)	A		N/A		2R ('15)
Year-end ranking	304 (WD); 1.170 (XD)	275 (WD); 152 (XD)	51 (WD); 71 (XD)	25 (WD); 69 (XD)	30 (WD); 37 (XD)	69 (WD); 136 (XD)	27	26	18 (WD); 32 (XD)
Tournament	2013	2014	2015	2016	2017	2018	2019	2020	Best
