= Susannah Leydon-Davis =

New Zealand badminton player (born 1992)

Personal information
- Born: 5 February 1992 (age 34) Hamilton, New Zealand
- Height: 1.69 m (5 ft 7 in)
- Weight: 60 kg (132 lb)

Sport
- Country: New Zealand
- Sport: Badminton
- Coached by: Tjitte Weistra

Women's & mixed doubles
- Highest ranking: 80 (WD) 6 June 2013; 43 (XD) 27 February 2014
- BWF profile
Medal record
Women's badminton
Representing New Zealand
Oceania Badminton Championships
Gold medal – first place	2014 Ballarat	Mixed doubles
Bronze medal – third place	2018 Hamilton	Mixed doubles
Bronze medal – third place	2017 Nouméa	Women's doubles
Oceania Mixed Team Championships
Silver medal – second place	2016 Auckland	Mixed team
Silver medal – second place	2014 Ballarat	Mixed team
Oceania Women's Team Championships
Silver medal – second place	2018 Hamilton	Women's team
Silver medal – second place	2016 Auckland	Women's team

Susannah Leydon-Davis (born 5 February 1992) is a New Zealand badminton player. In 2014, she competed at the Commonwealth Games in Glasgow, Scotland.

== Career ==
Originally from Hamilton, Leydon-Davis attended Hillcrest High School and was Sports Captain in 2009. In 2015 she graduated from the University of Waikato with a Bachelor of Management Studies. She competed at the Commonwealth Games in Glasgow July 2014. Susannah competes in the mixed doubles with her brother Oliver, and they have actively been New Zealand representatives. She and her brother, won the mixed doubles gold medal at the 2014 Oceania Badminton Championships. Teamed up with Kevin Dennerly-Minturn she won the Waikato International tournament in the mixed doubles event.

== Achievements ==
=== Oceania Championships ===
Women's doubles
Year	Venue	Partner	Opponent	Score	Result
2017	Salle Anewy; Nouméa, New Caledonia	(New Zealand) Danielle Tahuri	(Australia) Setyana Mapasa (Australia) Gronya Somerville	15–21, 7–21	Bronze

Mixed doubles
Year	Venue	Partner	Opponent	Score	Result
2018	Eastlink Badminton Stadium; Hamilton, New Zealand	(New Zealand) Oliver Leydon-Davis	(Australia) Sawan Serasinghe (Australia) Setyana Mapasa	12–21, 19–21	Bronze
2014	Ken Kay Badminton Hall; Ballarat, Australia	(New Zealand) Oliver Leydon-Davis	(Australia) Matthew Chau (Australia) Jacqueline Guan	21–19, 21–13	Gold

=== BWF International Challenge/Series ===
Women's doubles
Year	Tournament	Partner	Opponent	Score	Result
2018	North Harbour International	(New Zealand) Sally Fu	(Australia) Leanne Choo (Australia) Renuga Veeran	6–21, 12–21	(silver) Runner-up

Mixed doubles
Year	Tournament	Partner	Opponent	Score	Result
2017	Yonex / K&D Graphics International	(New Zealand) Oliver Leydon-Davis	(Canada) Nyl Yakura (Canada) Kristen Tsai	11–21, 8–21	(silver) Runner-up
2017	Nouméa International	(New Zealand) Dylan Soedjasa	(Australia) Sawan Serasinghe (Australia) Setyana Mapasa	13–21, 21–15, 17–21	(silver) Runner-up
2016	Waikato International	(New Zealand) Kevin Dennerly-Minturn	(New Zealand) Abhinav Manota (New Zealand) Justine Villegas	21–13, 21–14	(gold) Winner
2011	Counties Manukau International	(New Zealand) Oliver Leydon-Davis	(New Zealand) Daniel Shirley (New Zealand) Gabby Aves	11–21, 17–21	(silver) Runner-up

BWF International Challenge tournament
BWF International Series tournament
BWF Future Series tournament
