= Gronya Somerville =

Australian badminton player (born 1995)

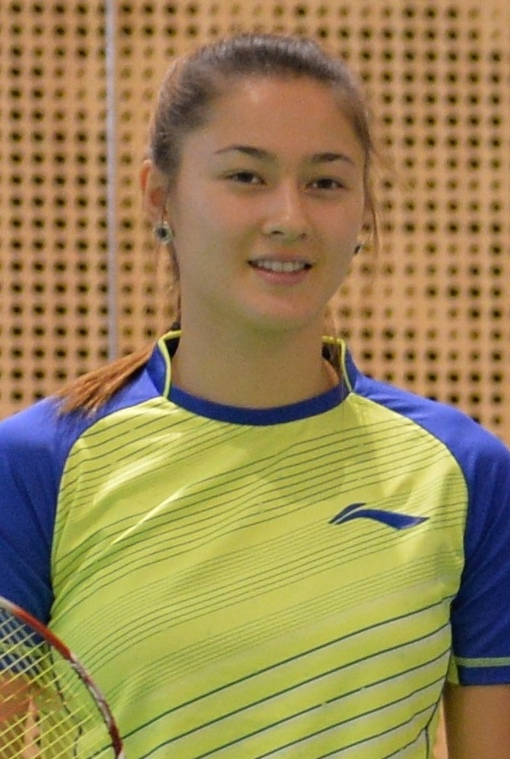
- Somerville in 2016

Personal information
- Born: 10 May 1995 (age 31) Carlton, Melbourne, Australia
- Height: 1.71 m (5 ft 7 in)
- Weight: 62 kg (137 lb)

Sport
- Country: Australia
- Sport: Badminton
- Handedness: Right

Women's & mixed doubles
- Highest ranking: 18 (WD with Setyana Mapasa, 2 March 2017); 43 (XD with Kenneth Choo, 31 October 2023); 51 (XD with Simon Leung, 17 March 2020)
- Current ranking: 56 (WD with Angela Yu, 30 June 2026)
- BWF profile
Medal record
Women's badminton
Representing Australia
Oceania Championships
Gold medal – first place	2014 Ballarat	Women's doubles
Gold medal – first place	2015 North Harbour	Women's doubles
Gold medal – first place	2017 Nouméa	Women's doubles
Gold medal – first place	2018 Hamilton	Women's doubles
Gold medal – first place	2019 Melbourne	Women's doubles
Gold medal – first place	2019 Melbourne	Mixed doubles
Gold medal – first place	2020 Ballarat	Women's doubles
Gold medal – first place	2020 Ballarat	Mixed doubles
Gold medal – first place	2022 Melbourne	Mixed doubles
Gold medal – first place	2023 Auckland	Mixed doubles
Gold medal – first place	2024 Geelong	Mixed doubles
Gold medal – first place	2025 Auckland	Women's doubles
Gold medal – first place	2025 Auckland	Mixed doubles
Gold medal – first place	2026 Auckland	Women's doubles
Silver medal – second place	2016 Papeete	Women's doubles
Silver medal – second place	2017 Nouméa	Mixed doubles
Silver medal – second place	2022 Melbourne	Women's doubles
Silver medal – second place	2024 Geelong	Women's doubles
Bronze medal – third place	2012 Ballarat	Mixed doubles
Bronze medal – third place	2014 Ballarat	Mixed doubles
Bronze medal – third place	2015 North Harbour	Mixed doubles
Bronze medal – third place	2023 Auckland	Women's doubles
Bronze medal – third place	2026 Auckland	Mixed doubles
Oceania Mixed Team Championships
Gold medal – first place	2012 Ballarat	Mixed team
Gold medal – first place	2014 Ballarat	Mixed team
Gold medal – first place	2016 Auckland	Mixed team
Gold medal – first place	2019 Melbourne	Mixed team
Gold medal – first place	2023 Auckland	Mixed team
Gold medal – first place	2025 Auckland	Mixed team
Oceania Women's Team Championships
Gold medal – first place	2012 Ballarat	Women's team
Gold medal – first place	2016 Auckland	Women's team
Gold medal – first place	2018 Hamilton	Women's team
Gold medal – first place	2020 Ballarat	Women's team
Gold medal – first place	2024 Geelong	Women's team
Gold medal – first place	2026 Auckland	Women's team

Gronya Somerville (born 10 May 1995) is an Australian badminton player specializing in doubles. She has won nine Oceania Championships titles, six in the women's doubles and three in the mixed doubles. She represented Australia in both women's doubles and mixed doubles at the 2020 Summer Olympics.

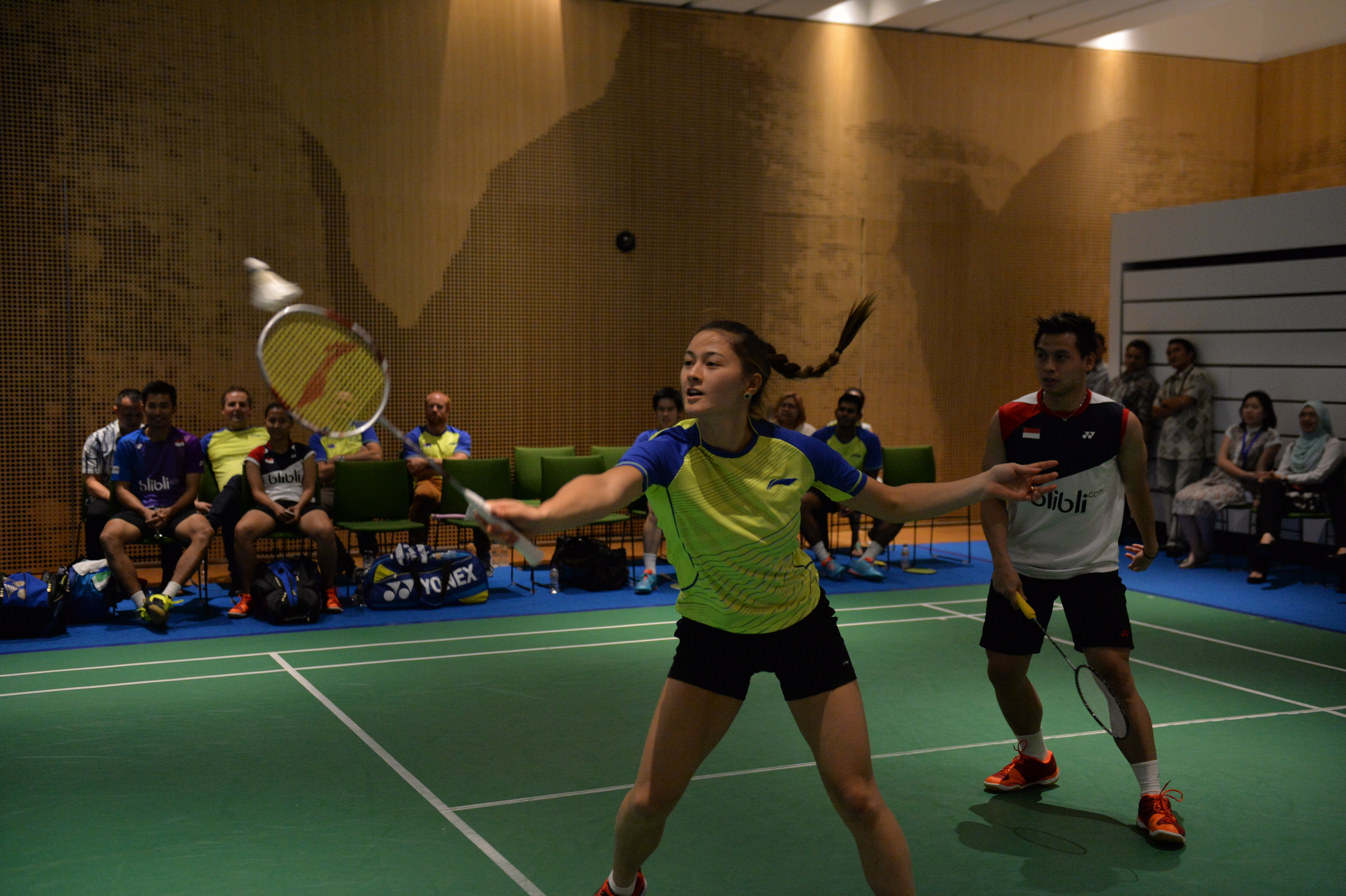
Somerville partnered with Riky Widianto in Australian Embassy Jakarta in 2016

== Personal life ==
Somerville, born to an Australian mother of Anglo-Celtic origin and a Chinese father, became famous when it was revealed that she is the descendant of a prominent Qing dynasty political reformer, Kang Youwei. She is studying exercise science at Victoria University.

== Career ==
Somerville's skills were discovered during a badminton talent identification program which she attended after receiving a flyer from her primary school PE teacher when she was about 12 or 13. Born in Melbourne in 1995, Somerville first captured the media's attention as a young player in 2012 at the Uber Cup in China.

She won gold medals at the 2014 Oceania Badminton Championships in women's doubles and mixed team events. Her former partners were Setyana Mapasa in women's doubles and Simon Leung in mixed doubles. She represented her country at the 2014 Commonwealth Games in Glasgow, Scotland. Together with Mapasa, they managed to win Australia's first ever Grand Prix title in 2016, after winning the Canada Open. They also won the Dutch Open in the same year. In 2017, she and Mapasa won the women's doubles title at the Oceania Championships, and a silver in the mixed doubles event partnered with Joel Findlay.

She competed at the 2020 Summer Olympics in the women's and mixed doubles but was eliminated in the group stage in both events.

== Achievements ==
=== Oceania Championships ===
Women's doubles
Year	Venue	Partner	Opponent	Score	Result
2014	Ken Kay Badminton Hall, Ballarat, Australia	(Australia) Jacqueline Guan	(Australia) Jacinta Joe (Australia) Louisa Ma	21–14, 21–17	Gold
2015	X-TRM North Harbour Badminton Centre, Auckland, New Zealand	(Australia) Leanne Choo	(Australia) Talia Saunders (Australia) Jennifer Tam	21–14, 21–11	Gold
2016	Punaauia University Hall, Papeete, Tahiti	(Australia) Melinda Sun	(Australia) Tiffany Ho (Australia) Jennifer Tam	17–21, 21–19, 20–22	Silver
2017	Salle Anewy, Nouméa, New Caledonia	(Australia) Setyana Mapasa	(Australia) Tiffany Ho (Australia) Joy Lai	16–21, 21–18, 21–14	Gold
2018	Eastlink Badminton Stadium, Hamilton, New Zealand	(Australia) Setyana Mapasa	(Australia) Leanne Choo (Australia) Renuga Veeran	21–14, 22–20	Gold
2019	Melbourne Sports and Aquatic Centre, Melbourne, Australia	(Australia) Setyana Mapasa	(Australia) Yingzi Jiang (Australia) Louisa Ma	21–10, 21–9	Gold
2020	Ken Kay Badminton Stadium, Ballarat, Australia	(Australia) Setyana Mapasa	(New Zealand) Sally Fu (New Zealand) Alyssa Tagle	21–9, 21–10	Gold
2022	Melbourne Sports and Aquatic Centre, Melbourne, Australia	(Australia) Kaitlyn Ea	(Australia) Joyce Choong (Australia) Sylvina Kurniawan	19–21, 15–21	Silver
2023	Auckland Badminton Stadium, Auckland, New Zealand	(Australia) Joyce Choong	(Australia) Sylvina Kurniawan (Australia) Setyana Mapasa	19–21, 11–21	Bronze
2024	Leisuretime Sports Precinct, Geelong, Australia	(Australia) Kaitlyn Ea	(Australia) Setyana Mapasa (Australia) Angela Yu	18–21, 11–21	Silver
2025	Badminton North Harbour Centre, Auckland, New Zealand	(Australia) Angela Yu	(Australia) Mimi Ngo (Australia) Maureen Clarissa Wijaya	21–10, 21–12	Gold
2026	Badminton North Harbour Centre, Auckland, New Zealand	(Australia) Angela Yu	(New Zealand) Berry Ng (New Zealand) Amanda Ting	21–9, 21–9	Gold

Mixed doubles
Year	Venue	Partner	Opponent	Score	Result
2012	Ken Kay Badminton Hall, Ballarat, Australia	(Australia) Ross Smith	(Australia) Glenn Warfe (Australia) Leanne Choo	11–21, 17–21	Bronze
2014	Ken Kay Badminton Hall, Ballarat, Australia	(Australia) Raymond Tam	(New Zealand) Oliver Leydon-Davis (New Zealand) Susannah Leydon-Davis	19–21, 19–21	Bronze
2015	X-TRM North Harbour Badminton Centre, Auckland, New Zealand	(Australia) Matthew Chau	(New Zealand) Oliver Leydon-Davis (New Zealand) Danielle Tahuri	15–21, 21–19, 14–21	Bronze
2017	Salle Anewy, Nouméa, New Caledonia	(Australia) Joel Findlay	(Australia) Sawan Serasinghe (Australia) Setyana Mapasa	19–21, 9–21	Silver
2019	Melbourne Sports and Aquatic Centre, Melbourne, Australia	(Australia) Simon Leung	(Australia) Sawan Serasinghe (Australia) Khoo Lee Yen	21–18, 21–15	Gold
2020	Ken Kay Badminton Stadium, Ballarat, Australia	(Australia) Simon Leung	(Australia) Pham Tran Hoang (Australia) Sylvina Kurniawan	21–12, 21–8	Gold
2022	Melbourne Sports and Aquatic Centre, Melbourne, Australia	(Australia) Kenneth Choo	(New Zealand) Oliver Leydon-Davis (New Zealand) Anona Pak	21–18, 19–21, 21–12	Gold
2023	Auckland Badminton Stadium, Auckland, New Zealand	(Australia) Kenneth Choo	(Australia) Lim Ming Chuen (Australia) Sylvina Kurniawan	21–12, 21–16	Gold
2024	Leisuretime Sports Precinct, Geelong, Australia	(Australia) Kenneth Choo	(New Zealand) Edward Lau (New Zealand) Shaunna Li	21–11, 25–27, 21–14	Gold
2025	Badminton North Harbour Centre, Auckland, New Zealand	(New Zealand) Vincent Tao	(New Zealand) Edward Lau (New Zealand) Shaunna Li	21–19, 14–21, 21–18	Gold
2026	Badminton North Harbour Centre, Auckland, New Zealand	(Australia) Rizky Hidayat	(Australia) Andika Ramadiansyah (Australia) Angela Yu	21–11, 16–21, 19–21	Bronze

=== BWF World Tour (1 title) ===
The BWF World Tour, which was announced on 19 March 2017 and implemented in 2018, is a series of elite badminton tournaments sanctioned by the Badminton World Federation (BWF). The BWF World Tour is divided into levels of World Tour Finals, Super 1000, Super 750, Super 500, Super 300 (part of the HSBC World Tour), and the BWF Tour Super 100.

Women's doubles
Year	Tournament	Level	Partner	Opponent	Score	Result
2019	Canada Open	Super 100	(Australia) Setyana Mapasa	(South Korea) Chang Ye-na (South Korea) Kim Hye-rin	21–16, 21–14	(gold) Winner

=== BWF Grand Prix (2 titles) ===
The BWF Grand Prix had two levels, the Grand Prix and Grand Prix Gold. It was a series of badminton tournaments sanctioned by the Badminton World Federation (BWF) and played between 2007 and 2017.

Women's doubles
Year	Tournament	Partner	Opponent	Score	Result
2016	Canada Open	(Australia) Setyana Mapasa	(England) Heather Olver (England) Lauren Smith	21–15, 21–16	(gold) Winner
2016	Dutch Open	(Australia) Setyana Mapasa	(Bulgaria) Gabriela Stoeva (Bulgaria) Stefani Stoeva	17–21, 21–17, 21–16	(gold) Winner

BWF Grand Prix Gold tournament
BWF Grand Prix tournament

=== BWF International Challenge/Series (10 titles, 16 runners-up) ===
Women's doubles
Year	Tournament	Partner	Opponent	Score	Result
2014	Auckland International	(Australia) Leanne Choo	(Chinese Taipei) Chang Ching-hui (Chinese Taipei) Chang Hsin-tien	11–6, 8–11, 10–11, 9–11	(silver) Runner-up
2015	Waikato International	(Australia) Setyana Mapasa	(Australia) Ruwindi Serasinghe (Australia) Alice Wu	21–13, 21–10	(gold) Winner
2015	Auckland International	(Australia) Setyana Mapasa	(Chinese Taipei) Pan Tzu-chin (Chinese Taipei) Tsai Hsin-yu	21–9, 21–5	(gold) Winner
2015	Maribyrnong International	(Australia) Setyana Mapasa	(Australia) Chen Hsuan-yu (Chinese Taipei) Shu Yu-lin	20–22, 17–21, 21–18	(gold) Winner
2015	Sydney International	(Australia) Setyana Mapasa	(Thailand) Jongkolphan Kititharakul (Thailand) Rawinda Prajongjai	13–21, 5–21	(silver) Runner-up
2015	Norwegian International	(Australia) Setyana Mapasa	(Denmark) Amanda Madsen (Denmark) Isabella Nielsen	21–5, 21–13	(gold) Winner
2015	Italian International	(Australia) Setyana Mapasa	(Bulgaria) Gabriela Stoeva (Bulgaria) Stefani Stoeva	19–21, 21–18, 6–13 retired	(silver) Runner-up
2016	Brazil International	(Australia) Setyana Mapasa	(Japan) Chisato Hoshi (Japan) Naru Shinoya	13–21, 19–21	(silver) Runner-up
2017	Nouméa International	(Australia) Setyana Mapasa	(Australia) Tiffany Ho (Australia) Joy Lai	21–11, 21–8	(gold) Winner
2019	South Australia International	(Australia) Setyana Mapasa	(Japan) Rin Iwanaga (Japan) Kie Nakanishi	15–21, 21–19, 9–21	(silver) Runner-up
2019	Nepal International	(Australia) Setyana Mapasa	(India) K. Maneesha (India) Rutaparna Panda	21–10, 18–21, 21–11	(gold) Winner
2019	Yonex / K&D Graphics International	(Australia) Setyana Mapasa	(Canada) Rachel Honderich (Canada) Kristen Tsai	14–21, 21–9, 21–18	(gold) Winner
2021	Irish Open	(Australia) Chen Hsuan-yu	(Netherlands) Debora Jille (Netherlands) Cheryl Seinen	21–15, 14–21, 14–21	(silver) Runner-up
2022	North Harbour International	(Australia) Chen Hsuan-yu	(Chinese Taipei) Sung Shuo-yun (Chinese Taipei) Yu Chien-hui	19–21, 17–21	(silver) Runner-up
2025	Polish Open	(Australia) Angela Yu	(United States) Lauren Lam (United States) Allison Lee	21–19, 15–21, 15–21	(silver) Runner-up
2025	Sydney International	(Australia) Angela Yu	(Chinese Taipei) Chen Su-yu (Chinese Taipei) Hsieh Yi-en	15–8, 13–15, 9–15	(silver) Runner-up
2026	Vietnam International	(Canada) Josephine Wu	(Japan) Miki Kanehiro (Japan) Yuna Kato	16–21, 21–19, 24–22	(gold) Winner

Mixed doubles
Year	Tournament	Partner	Opponent	Score	Result
2013	Auckland International	(Australia) Raymond Tam	(Australia) Ross Smith (Australia) Renuga Veeran	16–21, 12–21	(silver) Runner-up
2015	Waikato International	(Australia) Matthew Chau	(Australia) Sawan Serasinghe (Australia) Setyana Mapasa	13–21, 17–21	(silver) Runner-up
2015	Turkey International	(Australia) Matthew Chau	(Poland) Robert Mateusiak (Poland) Nadieżda Zięba	12–21, 13–21	(silver) Runner-up
2019	Waikato International	(Australia) Simon Leung	(Japan) Hiroki Midorikawa (Japan) Natsu Saito	15–21, 13–21	(silver) Runner-up
2023	Dutch International	(Australia) Kenneth Choo	(England) Brandon Yap (England) Annie Lado	21–18, 23–21	(gold) Winner
2023	Mongolia International	(Australia) Kenneth Choo	(Thailand) Tanakorn Meechai (Thailand) Fungfa Korpthammakit	22–20, 21–17	(gold) Winner
2023	Bendigo International	(Australia) Kenneth Choo	(Chinese Taipei) Chen Sheng-fa (Chinese Taipei) Lin Jhih-yun	21–12, 14–21, 11–21	(silver) Runner-up
2023	Sydney International	(Australia) Kenneth Choo	(Chinese Taipei) Chen Sheng-fa (Chinese Taipei) Lin Jhih-yun	18–21, 11–21	(silver) Runner-up
2024	Uganda International	(Australia) Kenneth Choo	(India) Sathish Kumar Karunakaran (India) Aadya Variyath	20–22, 21–18, 19–21	(silver) Runner-up

BWF International Challenge tournament
BWF International Series tournament
BWF Future Series tournament
