= Northern Mariana Islands national badminton team =

National badminton team representing the Northern Mariana Islands

Northern Mariana Islands
- Association: Northern Marianas Badminton Association (NMBA)
- Confederation: BO (Oceania)
- President: Merlie Tolentino

BWF ranking
- Current ranking: 73 ▼4 (2 January 2023)
- Highest ranking: 69 (4 July 2023)

Oceania Mixed Team Championships
- Appearances: 1 (first in 2023)
- Best result: 7th (2023)

The Northern Mariana Islands national badminton team (Chamorro: Inetnon juëgo de badminton na Islas Mariånas; Carolinian: Téén likkabadminton kka Efáng llól Marianas) represents Northern Mariana Islands, an unincorporated territory and commonwealth of the United States, in international badminton team competitions. The Northern Mariana Islands national team is controlled by the Northern Marianas Badminton Association in Saipan.

The Northern Mariana Islands competed in the 2022 Pacific Mini Games after qualifying as host nation. The team finished in fourth place after only scoring 2 points in the overall group tie.

== History ==
Badminton in the Northern Mariana Islands was first played in the 2000s and at the time was played by a large Asian community which consisted of mostly Filipinos in the region. The Northern Marianas Badminton Association was formed in 2008. The national team competed at the 2022 Pacific Mini Games when the team qualified as host team.

=== Mixed team ===
The Northern Mariana Islands first competed in the 2019 Pacific Games. The team finished 5th after beating Samoa and Kiribati. The Northern Mariana Islands then competed in the 2022 Pacific Mini Games mixed team event. The team won 2 points in the round robin tie after defeating Guam and Solomon Islands 5–0. In 2023, the team made their first appearance at the Oceania Badminton Championships mixed team event. The team first 5–0 to Australia and New Caledonia. The team then won a point after defeating the Cook Islands 3–2.

== Competitive record ==
=== Thomas Cup ===
Year	Result
(England) 1949	Not a member of the BWF
(Colony of Singapore) 1952	Not a member of the BWF
(Colony of Singapore) 1955	Not a member of the BWF
(Colony of Singapore) 1958	Not a member of the BWF
(Indonesia) 1961	Not a member of the BWF
(Japan) 1964	Not a member of the BWF
(Indonesia) 1967	Not a member of the BWF
(Malaysia) 1970	Not a member of the BWF
(Indonesia) 1973	Not a member of the BWF
(Thailand) 1976	Not a member of the BWF
(Indonesia) 1979	Not a member of the BWF
(England) 1982	Not a member of the BWF
(Malaysia) 1984	Not a member of the BWF
(Indonesia) 1986	Not a member of the BWF
(Malaysia) 1988	Not a member of the BWF
(Japan) 1990	Not a member of the BWF
(Malaysia) 1992	Not a member of the BWF
(Indonesia) 1994	Not a member of the BWF
(Hong Kong) 1996	Not a member of the BWF
(Hong Kong) 1998	Not a member of the BWF
(Malaysia) 2000	Not a member of the BWF
(China) 2002	Not a member of the BWF
(Indonesia) 2004	Not a member of the BWF
(Japan) 2006	Not a member of the BWF
(Indonesia) 2008	Not a member of the BWF
(Malaysia) 2010	Not a member of the BWF
(China) 2012	Did not enter
(India) 2014	Did not enter
(China) 2016	Did not enter
(Thailand) 2018	Did not enter
(Denmark) 2020	Did not enter
(Thailand) 2022	Did not enter
(China) 2024	Did not enter
(Denmark) 2026	Did not qualify
(N/A) 2028	TBD
(N/A) 2030	TBD

=== Uber Cup ===
Year	Result
(England) 1957	Not a member of the BWF
(United States) 1960	Not a member of the BWF
(United States) 1963	Not a member of the BWF
(New Zealand) 1966	Not a member of the BWF
(Japan) 1969	Not a member of the BWF
(Japan) 1972	Not a member of the BWF
(Indonesia) 1975	Not a member of the BWF
(New Zealand) 1978	Not a member of the BWF
(Japan) 1981	Not a member of the BWF
(Malaysia) 1984	Not a member of the BWF
(Indonesia) 1986	Not a member of the BWF
(Malaysia) 1988	Not a member of the BWF
(Japan) 1990	Not a member of the BWF
(Malaysia) 1992	Not a member of the BWF
(Indonesia) 1994	Not a member of the BWF
(Hong Kong) 1996	Not a member of the BWF
(Hong Kong) 1998	Not a member of the BWF
(Malaysia) 2000	Not a member of the BWF
(China) 2002	Not a member of the BWF
(Indonesia) 2004	Not a member of the BWF
(Japan) 2006	Not a member of the BWF
(Indonesia) 2008	Not a member of the BWF
(Malaysia) 2010	Not a member of the BWF
(China) 2012	Did not enter
(India) 2014	Did not enter
(China) 2016	Did not enter
(Thailand) 2018	Did not enter
(Denmark) 2020	Did not enter
(Thailand) 2022	Did not enter
(China) 2024	Did not enter
(Denmark) 2026	Did not qualify
(N/A) 2028	TBD
(N/A) 2030	TBD

=== Sudirman Cup ===
Year	Result
(Indonesia) 1989	Not a member of the BWF
(Denmark) 1991	Not a member of the BWF
(England) 1993	Not a member of the BWF
(Switzerland) 1995	Not a member of the BWF
(Scotland) 1997	Not a member of the BWF
(Denmark) 1999	Not a member of the BWF
(Spain) 2001	Not a member of the BWF
(Netherlands) 2003	Not a member of the BWF
(China) 2005	Not a member of the BWF
(Scotland) 2007	Not a member of the BWF
(China) 2009	Not a member of the BWF
(China) 2011	Did not enter
(Malaysia) 2013	Did not enter
(China) 2015	Did not enter
(Australia) 2017	Did not enter
(China) 2019	Did not enter
(Finland) 2021	Did not enter
(China) 2023	Did not qualify
(China) 2025	TBD
(N/A) 2027	TBD
(N/A) 2029	TBD

=== Oceania Team Championships ===
==== Men's team ====
Year	Round	Pos
(Australia) 2004	Not a member of BO	
(New Zealand) 2006	Not a member of BO	
(New Caledonia) 2008	Not a member of BO	
(New Zealand) 2010	Did not enter	
(Australia) 2012	Did not enter	
(New Zealand) 2016	Did not enter	
(New Zealand) 2018	Did not enter	
(Australia) 2020	Did not enter	
(Australia) 2024	Did not enter	
(New Zealand) 2026	6th place	

==== Women's team ====
Year	Round	Pos
(Australia) 2004	Not a member of BO	
(New Zealand) 2006	Not a member of BO	
(New Caledonia) 2008	Not a member of BO	
(New Zealand) 2010	Did not enter	
(Australia) 2012	Did not enter	
(New Zealand) 2016	Did not enter	
(New Zealand) 2018	Did not enter	
(Australia) 2020	Did not enter	
(Australia) 2024	Did not enter	
(New Zealand) 2026	Fourth place	4th

==== Mixed team ====
Year	Round	Pos
(Australia) 1999	Not a member of BO	
(Fiji) 2002	Not a member of BO	
(New Zealand) 2004	Not a member of BO	
(New Zealand) 2006	Not a member of BO	
(New Caledonia) 2008	Not a member of BO	
(New Zealand) 2010	Did not enter	
(Australia) 2012	Did not enter	
(Australia) 2014	Did not enter	
(New Zealand) 2016	Did not enter	
(Australia) 2019	Did not enter	
(New Zealand) 2023	Round robin − 7th	

=== Pacific Games ===
==== Mixed team ====
Year	Result
(Fiji) 2003	Did not enter
(Samoa) 2007	Did not enter
(New Caledonia) 2011	Did not enter
(Samoa) 2019	Did not enter
(French Polynesia) 2027	TBD

=== Pacific Mini Games ===
==== Mixed team ====
Year	Result
(Northern Mariana Islands) 2022	Fourth place

**Red border color indicates tournament was held on home soil.

== Junior competitive record ==
=== Suhandinata Cup ===
Year	Round	Pos
(China) 2000	Not a member of the BWF	
(South Africa) 2002	Not a member of the BWF	
(Canada) 2004	Not a member of the BWF	
(South Korea) 2006	Not a member of the BWF	
(New Zealand) 2007	Not a member of the BWF	
(India) 2008	Not a member of the BWF	
(Malaysia) 2009	Not a member of the BWF	
(Mexico) 2010	Not a member of the BWF	
(Chinese Taipei) 2011	Did not enter	
(Japan) 2012	Did not enter	
(Thailand) 2013	Did not enter	
(Malaysia) 2014	Did not enter	
(Peru) 2015	Did not enter	
(Spain) 2016	Did not enter	
(Indonesia) 2017	Did not enter	
(Canada) 2018	Did not enter	
(Russia) 2019	Did not enter	
(Spain) 2022	Did not enter	
(United States) 2023	Did not enter	
(China) 2024	Group stage	39th

=== Oceania Junior Team Championships ===
==== Mixed team ====
Year	Result
(Fiji) 2011	Did not enter
(French Polynesia) 2013	Did not enter
(New Zealand) 2015	Did not enter
(New Caledonia) 2017	Did not enter
(Australia) 2019	Did not enter
(New Zealand) 2023	Did not enter
(Northern Mariana Islands) 2025	(bronze) Third place

**Red border color indicates tournament was held on home soil.

== Players ==
=== Current squad ===
As of 2 January 2024

==== Men's team ====
Name	DoB/Age	Ranking of event		
Name	DoB/Age	MS	MD	XD
Ian Lubao	5 December 2004 (age 21)	660	349	–
Leonard Manuel	19 June 2001 (age 25)	547	349	740
Nathan Guerrero	3 August 1993 (age 33)	–	–	357

==== Women's team ====
Name	DoB/Age	Ranking of event		
Name	DoB/Age	WS	WD	XD
Jeanelyn Cardinio	27 January 1997 (age 29)	577	448	740
Janelle Pangilinan	29 July 1999 (age 27)	470	448	357
Jenine Savellano	14 May 1997 (age 29)	–	–	–

=== Previous squads ===
==== Oceania Team Championships ====
- Mixed team: 2023

==== Pacific Games ====
- Mixed team: 2019

==== Pacific Mini Games ====
- Mixed team: 2022
