= 2024 Oceania Men's & Women's Team Badminton Championships =

Tournament details
- Dates: 16–18 February
- Nations: 5 (Men's team); 4 (Women's team)
- Venue: Leisuretime Sports Precinct
- Location: Geelong, Victoria, Australia

The 2024 Oceania Men's & Women's Team Badminton Championships was a continental badminton team championships in Oceania sanctioned by the Badminton World Federation. The tournament was held from 16 to 18 February 2024.

== Tournament ==
The 2024 Oceania Men's & Women's Team Badminton Championships officially the Victor Oceania Men's and Women's Team Championships 2024, was a team continental championships tournament of badminton, to crown the best men's and women's team in Oceania, who would qualify to 2024 Thomas & Uber Cup. This tournament was organized by the Badminton Geelong and Badminton Oceania, with sanctioned of the Badminton World Federation.

=== Venue ===
The tournament was held at the Leisuretime Sports Precinct, Geelong, Victoria, Australia.

=== Competition format ===
The competition was held using a half-competition system (round-robin) with each team competing against each other once.

=== Tiebreakers ===
The rankings of teams in each group were determined per BWF Statutes Section 5.1, Article 16.3:

1. Number of matches won;
2. Match result between the teams in question;
3. Match difference in all group matches;
4. Game difference in all group matches;
5. Point difference in all group matches.

== Medal summary ==
=== Medalists ===
Event	Gold	Silver	Bronze
Men's team	Australia; Kenneth Choo; Shrey Dhand; Asher Ooi; Jacob Schueler; Nathan Tang; Ricky Tang; Rayne Wang; Jordan Yang; Jack Yu; Frederick Zhao	New Zealand; Ricky Cheng; Raphael Deloy; Daniel Hu; Adam Jeffrey; Avinash Shastri; Dylan Soedjasa; Ryan Tong; Jack Wang	Tahiti; Antoine Beaubois; Léo Cucuel; Yohann Lemaire; Elias Maublanc; Mike Mi You; Nicolas Mouret; Keali'i Taurua
Women's team	Australia; Kaitlyn Ea; Tiffany Ho; Setyana Mapasa; Dania Nugroho; Gronya Somerville; Catrina Tan; Bernice Teoh; Sydney Tjonadi; Isabella Yan; Angela Yu	New Zealand; Roanne Apalisok; Erena Calder-Hawkings; Yanxi Liu; Anona Pak; Justine Villegas; Josephine Zhao; Camellia Zhou; Jenny Zhu	Tahiti; Taphira Barsinas; Heirautea Curet; Mélissa Mi You; Myriam Siao; Esther Tau; Waianuhea Teheura

=== Medal table ===
* Host nation (Australia)

Rank	Nation	Gold	Silver	Bronze	Total
1	Australia*	2	0	0	2
2	New Zealand	0	2	0	2
3	Tahiti	0	0	2	2
Totals (3 entries)		2	2	2	6

== Men's team ==
Pos	Team	Pld	W	L	GF	GA	GD	PF	PA	PD	Pts	Qualification
1	Australia (H)	4	4	0	39	3	+36	878	384	+494	4	Qualified to 2024 Thomas Cup
2	New Zealand	4	3	1	33	9	+24	831	487	+344	3	
3	Tahiti	4	2	2	16	27	−11	616	766	−150	2	
4	Cook Islands	4	1	3	10	32	−22	438	800	−362	1	
5	Fiji	4	0	4	8	35	−27	527	853	−326	0	

Source: Tournament Software
Rules for classification: Tiebreakers
(H) Host

=== New Zealand vs Cook Islands ===
New Zealand
5
Leisuretime Sports Precinct, Court 1
February 16, 2024

Cook Islands
0

			1	2	3
1	(New Zealand) (Cook Islands)	Ricky Cheng; Daniel Akavi	21; 8	21; 2
2	(New Zealand) (Cook Islands)	Avinash Shastri; Emanuela Mataio	21; 3	21; 9
3	(New Zealand) (Cook Islands)	Daniel Hu; Edward Patai	21; 3	21; 4
4	(New Zealand) (Cook Islands)	Dylan Soedjasa / Jack Wang; Daniel Akavi / Damus Matakino	21; 7	21; 6
5	(New Zealand) (Cook Islands)	Raphael Chris Deloy / Ryan Tong; Edward Patai / David Piakura	21; 3	21; 3

=== Australia vs Fiji ===
Australia
5
Leisuretime Sports Precinct, Court 2
February 16, 2024

Fiji
0

			1	2	3
1	(Australia) (Fiji)	Nathan Tang; Chang Ho Kim	21; 5	21; 9
2	(Australia) (Fiji)	Jack Yu; Jared Chung	21; 4	21; 4
3	(Australia) (Fiji)	Asher Ooi; Robert Loo	21; 2	21; 3
4	(Australia) (Fiji)	Nathan Tang / Rayne Wang; Liam Fong / Chang Ho Kim	21; 13	21; 10
5	(Australia) (Fiji)	Jordan Yang / Frederick Zhao; Jared Chung / Robert Loo	21; 7	21; 4

=== Tahiti vs Fiji ===
Tahiti
4
Leisuretime Sports Precinct, Court 1
February 16, 2024

Fiji
1

			1	2	3
1	(French Polynesia) (Fiji)	Antoine Beaubois; Liam Fong	21; 11	21; 13
2	(French Polynesia) (Fiji)	Yohann Lemaire; Chang Ho Kim	21; 19	21; 17
3	(French Polynesia) (Fiji)	Elias Maublanc; Jared Chung	21; 8	21; 8
4	(French Polynesia) (Fiji)	Antoine Beaubois / Elias Maublanc; Liam Fong / Chang Ho Kim	18; 21	21; 12	21; 15
5	(French Polynesia) (Fiji)	Yohann Lemaire / Keali'I Taurua; Jared Chung / Robert Loo	21; 23	21; 13	19; 21

=== Australia vs Cook Islands ===
Australia
5
Leisuretime Sports Precinct, Court 2
February 16, 2024

Cook Islands
0

			1	2	3
1	(Australia) (Cook Islands)	Nathan Tang; Damus Matakino	21; 3	21; 6
2	(Australia) (Cook Islands)	Jacob Schueler; David Piakura	21; 1	21; 1
3	(Australia) (Cook Islands)	Jack Yu; Edward Patai	21; 2	21; 2
4	(Australia) (Cook Islands)	Asher Ooi / Ricky Tang; Daniel Akavi / Emanuela Mataio	21; 4	21; 7
5	(Australia) (Cook Islands)	Jordan Yang / Frederick Zhao; Edward Patai / David Piakura	21; 9	21; 4

=== New Zealand vs Fiji ===
New Zealand
5
Leisuretime Sports Precinct, Court 1
February 17, 2024

Fiji
0

			1	2	3
1	(New Zealand) (Fiji)	Ricky Cheng; Liam Fong	21; 12	21; 8
2	(New Zealand) (Fiji)	Avinash Shastri; Chang Ho Kim	21; 6	21; 12
3	(New Zealand) (Fiji)	Daniel Hu; Robert Loo	21; 7	21; 8
4	(New Zealand) (Fiji)	Adam Jeffrey / Ryan Tong; Liam Fong / Chang Ho Kim	21; 9	21; 8
5	(New Zealand) (Fiji)	Raphael Chris Deloy / Jack Wang; Jared Chung / Robert Loo	21; 6	21; 10

=== Australia vs Tahiti ===
Australia
5
Leisuretime Sports Precinct, Court 2
February 17, 2024

Tahiti
0

			1	2	3
1	(Australia) (French Polynesia)	Jacob Schueler; Yohann Lemaire	21; 3	21; 7
2	(Australia) (French Polynesia)	Shrey Dhand; Keali'i Taurua	21; 10	21; 5
3	(Australia) (French Polynesia)	Asher Ooi; Elias Maublanc	21; 10	21; 7
4	(Australia) (French Polynesia)	Ricky Tang / Jack Yu; Yohann Lemaire / Keali'i Taurua	21; 6	21; 3
5	(Australia) (French Polynesia)	Kenneth Choo / Rayne Wang; Antoine Beaubois / Elias Maublanc	21; 16	21; 16

=== Cook Islands vs Fiji ===
Cook Islands
3
Leisuretime Sports Precinct, Court 1
February 17, 2024

Fiji
2

			1	2	3
1	(Cook Islands) (Fiji)	Brendan Lee; Liam Fong	5; 21	14; 21
2	(Cook Islands) (Fiji)	Emanuela Mataio; Chang Ho Kim	16; 21	21; 14	21; 15
3	(Cook Islands) (Fiji)	Daniel Akavi; Jared Chung	21; 19	24; 22
4	(Cook Islands) (Fiji)	Damus Matakino / David Piakura; Liam Fong / Chang Ho Kim	8; 21	14; 21
5	(Cook Islands) (Fiji)	Daniel Akavi / Emanuela Mataio; Jared Chung / Robert Loo	21; 12	21; 12

=== New Zealand vs Tahiti ===
New Zealand
5
Leisuretime Sports Precinct, Court 2
February 17, 2024

Tahiti
0

			1	2	3
1	(New Zealand) (French Polynesia)	Ricky Cheng; Antoine Beaubois	21; 17	21; 11
2	(New Zealand) (French Polynesia)	Raphael Chris Deloy; Keali'i Taurua	21; 7	21; 14
3	(New Zealand) (French Polynesia)	Daniel Hu; Elias Maublanc	21; 5	21; 14
4	(New Zealand) (French Polynesia)	Ryan Tong / Jack Wang; Yohann Lemaire / Keali'i Taurua	21; 8	21; 4
5	(New Zealand) (French Polynesia)	Adam Jeffrey / Dylan Soedjasa; Antoine Beaubois / Elias Maublanc	21; 10	21; 15

=== Australia vs New Zealand ===
Australia
4
Leisuretime Sports Precinct, Court 1
February 18, 2024

New Zealand
1

			1	2	3
1	(Australia) (New Zealand)	Jacob Schueler; Ricky Cheng	21; 15	14; 21	19; 21
2	(Australia) (New Zealand)	Ricky Tang; Raphael Chris Deloy	21; 13	21; 10
3	(Australia) (New Zealand)	Jack Yu; Daniel Hu	21; 15	21; 14
4	(Australia) (New Zealand)	Kenneth Choo / Rayne Wang; Adam Jeffrey / Dylan Soedjasa	26; 24	15; 21	21; 10
5	(Australia) (New Zealand)	Ricky Tang / Jack Yu; Ryan Tong / Jack Wang	21; 12	27; 25

=== Tahiti vs Cook Islands ===
Tahiti
3
Leisuretime Sports Precinct, Court 2
February 18, 2024

Cook Islands
2

			1	2	3
1	(French Polynesia) (Cook Islands)	Antoine Beaubois; Brendan Lee	21; 6	21; 12
2	(French Polynesia) (Cook Islands)	Yohann Lemaire; Damus Matakino	21; 9	21; 13
3	(French Polynesia) (Cook Islands)	Elias Maublanc; Emanuela Mataio	21; 14	21; 14
4	(French Polynesia) (Cook Islands)	Antoine Beaubois / Elias Maublanc; Damus Matakino / David Piakura	0; 21	0; 21		w/o
5	(French Polynesia) (Cook Islands)	Nicolas Mouret / Keali'i Taurua; Brendan Lee / Emanuela Mataio	18; 21	21; 13	16; 21

== Women's team ==
Pos	Team	Pld	W	L	GF	GA	GD	PF	PA	PD	Pts	Qualification
1	Australia (H)	3	3	0	30	1	+29	648	290	+358	3	Qualified to 2024 Uber Cup
2	New Zealand	3	2	1	21	10	+11	571	405	+166	2	
3	Tahiti	3	1	2	10	21	−11	426	560	−134	1	
4	Cook Islands	3	0	3	1	30	−29	259	649	−390	0	

Source: Tournament Software
Rules for classification: Tiebreakers
(H) Host

=== Australia vs Cook Islands ===
Australia
5
Leisuretime Sports Precinct, Court 1
February 16, 2024

Cook Islands
0

			1	2	3
1	(Australia) (Cook Islands)	Kai Teoh; Tereapii Akavi	21; 4	21; 2
2	(Australia) (Cook Islands)	Sydney Tjonadi; Eleanor Wichman	21; 4	21; 4
3	(Australia) (Cook Islands)	Isabella Yan; Morani Karika	21; 7	21; 7
4	(Australia) (Cook Islands)	Kai Teoh / Sydney Tjonadi; Arihoia Sprague-Marsters / Eleanor Wichman	21; 5	21; 5
5	(Australia) (Cook Islands)	Dania Nugroho / Catrina Tan; Tereapii Akavi / Morani Karika	21; 8	21; 4

=== New Zealand vs Tahiti ===
New Zealand
5
Leisuretime Sports Precinct, Court 2
February 16, 2024

Tahiti
0

			1	2	3
1	(New Zealand) (French Polynesia)	Jenny Zhu; Myriam Siao	21; 2	21; 8
2	(New Zealand) (French Polynesia)	Josephine Zhao; Méiissa Mi You	21; 6	21; 10
3	(New Zealand) (French Polynesia)	Yanxi Liu; Heirautea Curet	21; 17	21; 15
4	(New Zealand) (French Polynesia)	Roanne Apalisok / Justine Villegas; Taphira Barsinas / Myriam Siao	21; 6	21; 14
5	(New Zealand) (French Polynesia)	Erena Calder-Hawkins / Camellia Zhou; Heirautea Curet / Esther Tau	21; 12	21; 18

=== Australia vs Tahiti ===
Australia
5
Leisuretime Sports Precinct, Court 1
February 17, 2024

Tahiti
0

			1	2	3
1	(Australia) (French Polynesia)	Kai Teoh; Taphira Barsinas	21; 5	21; 8
2	(Australia) (French Polynesia)	Sydney Tjonadi; Méiissa Mi You	21; 10	21; 10
3	(Australia) (French Polynesia)	Isabella Yan; Heirautea Curet	21; 11	21; 13
4	(Australia) (French Polynesia)	Dania Nugroho / Catrina Tan; Méiissa Mi You / Myriam Siao	21; 5	21; 8
5	(Australia) (French Polynesia)	Kaitlyn Ea / Gronya Somerville; Heirautea Curet / Esther Tau	21; 11	21; 9

=== New Zealand vs Cook Islands ===
New Zealand
5
Leisuretime Sports Precinct, Court 2
February 17, 2024

Cook Islands
0

			1	2	3
1	(New Zealand) (Cook Islands)	Jenny Zhu; Tereapii Akavi	21; 7	21; 8
2	(New Zealand) (Cook Islands)	Josephine Zhao; Eleanor Wichman	21; 8	21; 10
3	(New Zealand) (Cook Islands)	Yanxi Liu; Morani Karika	21; 9	21; 5
4	(New Zealand) (Cook Islands)	Anona Pak / Justine Villegas; Arihoia Sprague-Marsters / Eleanor Wichman	21; 5	21; 5
5	(New Zealand) (Cook Islands)	Roanne Apalisok / Camellia Zhou; Tereapii Akavi / Morani Karika	21; 8	21; 4

=== Australia vs New Zealand ===
Australia
5
Leisuretime Sports Precinct, Court 1
February 18, 2024

New Zealand
0

			1	2	3
1	(Australia) (New Zealand)	Tiffany Ho; Jenny Zhu	21; 14	22; 20
2	(Australia) (New Zealand)	Setyana Mapasa / Angela Yu; Erena Calder-Hawkins / Camellia Zhou	21; 9	21; 10
3	(Australia) (New Zealand)	Kai Teoh; Josephine Zhao	21; 7	21; 16
4	(Australia) (New Zealand)	Kaitlyn Ea / Gronya Somerville; Roanne Apalisok / Anona Pak	21; 8	21; 14
5	(Australia) (New Zealand)	Sydney Tjonadi; Yanxi Liu	21; 12	16; 21	22; 20

=== Tahiti vs Cook Islands ===
Tahiti
5
Leisuretime Sports Precinct, Court 2
February 18, 2024

Cook Islands
0

			1	2	3
1	(French Polynesia) (Cook Islands)	Méiissa Mi You; Te Pa O Te Rangi Tupa	21; 15	21; 12
2	(French Polynesia) (Cook Islands)	Esther Tau; Tereapii Akavi	21; 14	21; 18
3	(French Polynesia) (Cook Islands)	Heirautea Curet; Morani Karika	21; 11	21; 7
4	(French Polynesia) (Cook Islands)	Heirautea Curet / Esther Tau; Tereapii Akavi / Te Pa O Te Rangi Tupa	21; 7	19; 21	21; 11
5	(French Polynesia) (Cook Islands)	Méiissa Mi You / Myriam Siao; Morani Karika / Eleanor Wichman	21; 15	21; 9
