= 2024 BWF World Junior Championships – Teams event =

2024 BWF World Junior Championships

2024 BWF World Junior Championships Teams event
Tournament details
- Dates: 30 September – 5 October 2024
- Edition: 24th
- Level: International
- Nations: 40
- Venue: Nanchang International Sports Center
- Location: Nanchang, Jiangxi, China
- Winner: Indonesia

The teams event of the 2024 BWF World Junior Championships is being held from 30 September – 5 October 2024. The event is also known as the 2024 Suhandinata Cup. China was the champion of the last edition held in Spokane, United States. Indonesia emerges champion after defeating China in the final.

40 countries representing all five continental federations are competing in this event. The group draw was done on 22 August. The defending champions China were drawn with former champions South Korea, Australia, Hong Kong and Ghana in group A.

== Seedings ==
The seedings for teams competing in the tournament were released on July 16, 2024. It was based on aggregated points from the best players in the BWF World Junior Ranking. The teams was divided into three pots, with China and Thailand were the two top seeds with another 6 teams, another 8 teams were put in the second groups. Twenty-seven other teams (seeded 17–43) were seeded into third groups. The draw was held on 22 August in Nanchang.

=== Group 1 (Seeded 1-8) ===
1. China (final)
2. Thailand (9th place)
3. Malaysia (semi-finalist)
4. Indonesia (champions)
5. France (10th place)
6. Japan (semi-finalist)
7. United Arab Emirates (debut) (11th place)
8. India (quarter-finalist)

=== Group 2 (Seeded 9-16) ===
9. South Korea (13th place)
10. Denmark (quarter-finalist)
11. Chinese Taipei (quarter-finalist)
12. Netherlands (23rd place)
13. Slovenia (22nd place)
14. United States (quarter-finalist)
15. Poland (12th place)
16. Turkey (14th place)

=== Group 3 (Seeded 17-43) ===
17. Australia
18. Estonia
19. Singapore
20. ~~Croatia~~ (withdrew)
21. Mauritius (debut)
22. England
23. Slovakia
24. Portugal
25. Uganda
26. Peru
27. Sri Lanka
28. Hong Kong
29. Vietnam
30. Norway
31. Philippines
32. Northern Mariana Islands (debut)
33. New Zealand
34. Azerbaijan (debut)
35. Trinidad and Tobago (debut)
36. Cook Islands
37. Latvia
38. Ghana
39. ~~Tahiti~~ (withdrew)
40. Mongolia
41. Macau
42. Armenia
43. ~~Brazil~~ (withdrew)

== Group composition ==
The draw for 40 teams competing in the tournament were announced on 22 August 2024.

Group A	Group B	Group C	Group D
1. China [1]; 2. South Korea [9/16]; 3. Australia; 4. Hong Kong; 5. ~~Ghana~~ (withdraw)	1. France [5/8]; 2. Chinese Taipei [9/16]; 3. Singapore; 4. Slovakia; 5. Armenia	1. Malaysia [3/4]; 2. Netherlands [9/16]; 3. Estonia; 4. Norway; 5. Mongolia	1. United Arab Emirates [5/8]; 2. Denmark [9/16]; 3. New Zealand; 4. Trinidad and Tobago; 5. Cook Islands
Group E	Group F	Group G	Group H
1. India [5/8]; 2. Turkey [9/16]; 3. Mauritius; 4. Peru; 5. Azerbaijan	1. Indonesia [3/4]; 2. Poland [9/16]; 3. Sri Lanka; 4. Northern Mariana Islands; 5. Macau	1. Japan [5/8]; 2. Slovenia [9/16]; 3. England; 4. Uganda; 5. Latvia	1. Thailand [2]; 2. United States [9/16]; 3. Portugal; 4. Vietnam; 5. Philippines

== Group stage ==
=== Group A ===
Pos	Team	Pld	W	L	MF	MA	MD	GF	GA	GD	PF	PA	PD	Pts	Qualification	China national badminton team	South Korea national badminton team	Hong Kong national badminton team	Australia national badminton team	Ghana national badminton team
1	China [1] (H)	4	4	0	330	174	+156	30	0	+30	1815	970	+845	4	Qualified to knockout stage 1st to 8th	—	110–69	110–59	110–46	w/o
2	South Korea [9/16]	4	3	1	289	269	+20	18	12	+6	1565	1490	+75	3	Qualified to knockout stage 9th to 16th place		—	110–96	110–63	w/o
3	Hong Kong [17/40]	4	2	2	265	291	−26	12	18	−6	1490	1604	−114	2	Qualified to knockout stage 17th to 24th place			—		w/o
4	Australia [17/40]	4	1	3	180	330	−150	0	30	−30	1009	1815	−806	1	Qualified to knockout stage 25th to 32nd place			71–110	—	w/o
5	Ghana [17/40]	4	0	4	0	0	0	0	0	0	0	0	0	0	Withdrawn					—

Source: TS
(H) Host

=== Group B ===
Pos	Team	Pld	W	L	MF	MA	MD	GF	GA	GD	PF	PA	PD	Pts	Qualification	Chinese Taipei national badminton team	France national badminton team	Singapore national badminton team	Slovakia national badminton team	Armenia national badminton team
1	Chinese Taipei [9/16]	4	4	0	440	267	+173	35	5	+30	2390	1412	+978	4	Qualified to knockout stage 1st to 8th	—		110–59	110–56	110–47
2	France [5/8]	4	3	1	435	279	+156	34	6	+28	2399	1532	+867	3	Qualified to knockout stage 9th to 16th place	105–110	—	110–73	110–49	110–47
3	Singapore [17/40]	4	2	2	352	345	+7	21	19	+2	1944	1871	+73	2	Qualified to knockout stage 17th to 24th place			—	110–78	110–47
4	Slovakia [17/40]	4	1	3	293	385	−92	10	30	−20	1569	2129	−560	1	Qualified to knockout stage 25th to 32nd place				—	110–55
5	Armenia [17/40]	4	0	4	196	440	−244	0	40	−40	1062	2420	−1358	0	Qualified to knockout stage 33rd to 40th place					—

Source: TS

=== Group C ===
Pos	Team	Pld	W	L	MF	MA	MD	GF	GA	GD	PF	PA	PD	Pts	Qualification	Malaysia national badminton team	Estonia national badminton team	Netherlands national badminton team	Norway national badminton team	Mongolia national badminton team
1	Malaysia [3/4]	4	4	0	440	213	+227	40	0	+40	2420	1124	+1296	4	Qualified to knockout stage 1st to 8th	—	110–61	110–53	110–51	110–48
2	Estonia [17/40]	4	3	1	391	332	+59	29	11	+18	2141	1784	+357	3	Qualified to knockout stage 9th to 16th place		—		110–78	110–50
3	Netherlands [9/16]	4	2	2	367	361	+6	17	23	−6	1950	2010	−60	2	Qualified to knockout stage 17th to 24th place		94–110	—	110–95	110–46
4	Norway [17/40]	4	1	3	334	379	−45	14	26	−12	1877	2076	−199	1	Qualified to knockout stage 25th to 32nd place				—	110–49
5	Mongolia [17/40]	4	0	4	193	440	−247	0	40	−40	1026	2420	−1394	0	Qualified to knockout stage 33rd to 40th place					—

Source: TS

=== Group D ===
Pos	Team	Pld	W	L	MF	MA	MD	GF	GA	GD	PF	PA	PD	Pts	Qualification	Denmark national badminton team	United Arab Emirates national badminton team	New Zealand national badminton team	Cook Islands national badminton team	Trinidad and Tobago national badminton team
1	Denmark [9/16]	4	4	0	440	255	+185	40	0	+40	2420	1333	+1087	4	Qualified to knockout stage 1st to 8th	—		110–70	110–48	110–45
2	United Arab Emirates [5/8]	4	3	1	422	283	+139	30	10	+20	2272	1470	+802	3	Qualified to knockout stage 9th to 16th place	92–110	—	110–70	110–56	110–47
3	New Zealand [17/40]	4	2	2	360	332	+28	20	20	0	1941	1786	+155	2	Qualified to knockout stage 17th to 24th place			—	110–53	110–59
4	Cook Islands [17/40]	4	1	3	267	411	−144	9	31	−22	1400	2194	−794	1	Qualified to knockout stage 25th to 32nd place				—	
5	Trinidad and Tobago [17/40]	4	0	4	232	440	−208	1	39	−38	1169	2419	−1250	0	Qualified to knockout stage 33rd to 40th place				81–110	—

Source: TS

=== Group E ===
Pos	Team	Pld	W	L	MF	MA	MD	GF	GA	GD	PF	PA	PD	Pts	Qualification	India national badminton team	Turkey national badminton team	Peru national badminton team	Mauritius national badminton team	Azerbaijan national badminton team
1	India [5/8]	4	4	0	440	253	+187	39	1	+38	2416	1361	+1055	4	Qualified to knockout stage 1st to 8th	—	110–99	110–50	110–49	110–55
2	Turkey [9/16]	4	3	1	429	321	+108	28	12	+16	2336	1778	+558	3	Qualified to knockout stage 9th to 16th place		—	110–89	110–62	110–60
3	Peru [17/40]	4	2	2	359	398	−39	16	24	−8	1959	2276	−317	2	Qualified to knockout stage 17th to 24th place			—		110–97
4	Mauritius [17/40]	4	1	3	302	412	−110	11	29	−18	1721	2208	−487	1	Qualified to knockout stage 25th to 32nd place			81–110	—	110–82
5	Azerbaijan [17/40]	4	0	4	294	440	−146	6	34	−28	1575	2384	−809	0	Qualified to knockout stage 33rd to 40th place					—

Source: TS

=== Group F ===
Pos	Team	Pld	W	L	MF	MA	MD	GF	GA	GD	PF	PA	PD	Pts	Qualification	Indonesia national badminton team	Poland national badminton team	Sri Lanka national badminton team	Macau national badminton team	Northern Mariana Islands national badminton team
1	Indonesia [3/4]	4	4	0	440	230	+210	40	0	+40	2420	1243	+1177	4	Qualified to knockout stage 1st to 8th	—	110–63	110–62	110–58	110–47
2	Poland [9/16]	4	3	1	393	345	+48	24	16	+8	2148	1931	+217	3	Qualified to knockout stage 9th to 16th place		—	110–104	110–83	110–48
3	Sri Lanka [17/40]	4	2	2	386	328	+58	22	18	+4	2104	1841	+263	2	Qualified to knockout stage 17th to 24th place			—	110–63	110–45
4	Macau [17/40]	4	1	3	314	379	−65	14	26	−12	1812	2072	−260	1	Qualified to knockout stage 25th to 32nd place				—	
5	Northern Mariana Islands [17/40]	4	0	4	189	440	−251	0	40	−40	1023	2420	−1397	0	Qualified to knockout stage 33rd to 40th place				49–110	—

Source: TS

=== Group G ===
Pos	Team	Pld	W	L	MF	MA	MD	GF	GA	GD	PF	PA	PD	Pts	Qualification	Japan national badminton team	England national badminton team	Slovenia national badminton team	Latvia national badminton team	Uganda national badminton team
1	Japan [5/8]	4	4	0	440	207	+233	40	0	+40	2420	1083	+1337	4	Qualified to knockout stage 1st to 8th	—	110–64	110–47	110–48	110–48
2	England [17/40]	4	3	1	394	316	+78	26	14	+12	2124	1722	+402	3	Qualified to knockout stage 9th to 16th place		—		110–47	110–54
3	Slovenia [9/16]	4	2	2	372	356	+16	24	16	+8	2045	1905	+140	2	Qualified to knockout stage 17th to 24th place		105–110	—	110–78	110–58
4	Latvia [17/40]	4	1	3	283	413	−130	10	30	−20	1541	2204	−663	1	Qualified to knockout stage 25th to 32nd place				—	
5	Uganda [17/40]	4	0	4	243	440	−197	0	40	−40	1204	2420	−1216	0	Qualified to knockout stage 33rd to 40th place				83–110	—

Source: TS

=== Group H ===
Pos	Team	Pld	W	L	MF	MA	MD	GF	GA	GD	PF	PA	PD	Pts	Qualification	United States national badminton team	Thailand national badminton team	Vietnam national badminton team	Philippines national badminton team	Portugal national badminton team
1	United States [9/16]	4	4	0	440	369	+71	32	8	+24	2343	2054	+289	4	Qualified to knockout stage 1st to 8th	—		110–85	110–108	110–69
2	Thailand [2]	4	3	1	437	360	+77	32	8	+24	2371	1927	+444	3	Qualified to knockout stage 9th to 16th place	107–110	—	110–97	110–78	110–75
3	Vietnam [17/40]	4	2	2	402	372	+30	16	24	−8	2114	2081	+33	2	Qualified to knockout stage 17th to 24th place			—	110–93	
4	Philippines [17/40]	4	1	3	389	408	−19	20	20	0	2216	2133	+83	1	Qualified to knockout stage 25th to 32nd place				—	
5	Portugal [17/40]	4	0	4	281	440	−159	0	40	−40	1571	2420	−849	0	Qualified to knockout stage 33rd to 40th place			59–110	78–110	—

Source: TS

== Final stage ==
=== 1st to 8th ===
5th–6th place match
B	Chinese Taipei	110
E	India	87
7th–8th place match
D	Denmark	104
H	United States	110

5th to 8th semifinals
B	Chinese Taipei	110
D	Denmark	93
E	India	110
H	United States	101

1st to 8th quarterfinals
A	China	110
B	Chinese Taipei	74
C	Malaysia	110
D	Denmark	85
E	India	92
F	Indonesia	110
G	Japan	110
H	United States	88

1st to 4th semifinals
A	China	110
C	Malaysia	76
F	Indonesia	110
G	Japan	105

Final
A	China	103
F	Indonesia	110

==== 1st to 8th quarterfinals ====
===== China vs Chinese Taipei =====
China (110–74) Chinese Taipei; Thursday, 3 October 2024, 12:30 UTC+8; Nanchang International Sports Center, Court 1
#	Category	China	Score (Partition score)	Chinese Taipei
1	WS	Xu Wenjing (China)	(11–8) (11–8)	(Chinese Taipei) Wang Pei-yu
2	XD	Lin Xiangyi (China); Liu Yuanyuan (China)	(22–15) (11–7)	(Chinese Taipei) Lai Po-yu (Chinese Taipei) Sun Liang-ching
3	MD	Hu Keyuan (China); Lin Xiangyi (China)	(33–20) (11–5)	(Chinese Taipei) Bao Xin Da Gu La Wai (Chinese Taipei) Tsai Cheng-ying
4	MS	Hu Zhe'an (China)	(44–29) (11–9)	(Chinese Taipei) Wu Zhe-ying
5	WD	Chen Fanshutian (China); Liu Jiayue (China)	(55–40) (11–11)	(Chinese Taipei) Chen Yan-fei (Chinese Taipei) Sun Liang-ching
6	WS	Xu Wenjing (China)	(66–44) (11–4)	(Chinese Taipei) Wang Pei-yu
7	XD	Lin Xiangyi (China); Liu Yuanyuan (China)	(77–49) (11–5)	(Chinese Taipei) Lai Po-yu (Chinese Taipei) Sun Liang-ching
8	MD	Hu Keyuan (China); Lin Xiangyi (China)	(88–60) (11–11)	(Chinese Taipei) Bao Xin Da Gu La Wai (Chinese Taipei) Lai Po-yu
9	MS	Hu Zhe'an (China)	(99–66) (11–6)	(Chinese Taipei) Wu Zhe-ying
10	WD	Chen Fanshutian (China); Liu Jiayue (China)	(110–74) (11–8)	(Chinese Taipei) Chen Yan-fei (Chinese Taipei) Sun Liang-ching

===== Malaysia vs Denmark =====
Malaysia (110–85) Denmark; Thursday, 3 October 2024, 12:30 UTC+8; Nanchang International Sports Center, Court 4
#	Category	Malaysia	Score (Partition score)	Denmark
1	WS	Ong Xin Yee (Malaysia)	(11–8) (11–8)	(Denmark) Kajsa Van Dalm
2	MD	Muhammad Faiq (Malaysia); Lok Hong Quan (Malaysia)	(22–12) (11–4)	(Denmark) Philip Kryger Boe (Denmark) Jakob Clausen Jessen
3	XD	Kang Khai Xing (Malaysia); Dania Sofea (Malaysia)	(33–21) (11–9)	(Denmark) Otto Reiler (Denmark) Amanda Aarrebo Petersen
4	WD	Dania Sofea (Malaysia); Carmen Ting (Malaysia)	(44–27) (11–6)	(Denmark) Anna-Sofie Nielsen (Denmark) Amanda Aarrebo Petersen
5	MS	Muhammad Faiq (Malaysia)	(55–38) (11–11)	(Denmark) William Bøgebjerg
6	WS	Ong Xin Yee (Malaysia)	(66–45) (11–7)	(Denmark) Kajsa Van Dalm
7	MD	Kang Khai Xing (Malaysia); Aaron Tai (Malaysia)	(77–50) (11–5)	(Denmark) Robert Nebel (Denmark) Otto Reiler
8	XD	Aaron Tai (Malaysia); Carmen Ting (Malaysia)	(88–63) (11–13)	(Denmark) Otto Reiler (Denmark) Amanda Aarrebo Petersen
9	WD	Ong Xin Yee (Malaysia); Carmen Ting (Malaysia)	(99–73) (11–10)	(Denmark) Anna-Sofie Nielsen (Denmark) Amanda Aarrebo Petersen
10	MS	Sng Wei Ming (Malaysia)	(110–85) (11–12)	(Denmark) Salomon Adam Thomasen

===== India vs Indonesia =====
India (92–110) Indonesia; Thursday, 3 October 2024, 15:30 UTC+8; Nanchang International Sports Center, Court 4
#	Category	India	Score (Partition score)	Indonesia
1	MS	Pranay Shettigar (India)	(1–11) (1–11)	(Indonesia) Zaki Ubaidillah
2	MD	Bhargav Ram Arigela (India); Viswa Tej Gobburu (India)	(8–22) (3–11)	(Indonesia) Dexter Farrell (Indonesia) Wahyu Agung Prasetyo
3	WS	Tanvi Sharma (India)	(17–33) (7–11)	(Indonesia) Mutiara Ayu Puspitasari
4	WD	Taarini Suri (India); Shravani Walekar (India)	(29–44) (12–11)	(Indonesia) Isyana Syahira Meida (Indonesia) Rinjani Kwinara Nastine
5	XD	Bhavya Chhabra (India); Shravani Walekar (India)	(42–55) (13–11)	(Indonesia) Taufik Aderya (Indonesia) Clairine Yustin Mulia
6	MS	Pranay Shettigar (India)	(52–66) (10–11)	(Indonesia) Richie Duta Richardo
7	MD	Bhargav Ram Arigela (India); Viswa Tej Gobburu (India)	(64–77) (12–11)	(Indonesia) Anselmus Prasetya (Indonesia) Pulung Ramadhan
8	WS	Tanvi Sharma (India)	(74–88) (10–11)	(Indonesia) Ni Kadek Dhinda Amartya Pratiwi
9	WD	Taarini Suri (India); Shravani Walekar (India)	(82–99) (8–11)	(Indonesia) Isyana Syahira Meida (Indonesia) Rinjani Kwinara Nastine
10	XD	Bhavya Chhabra (India); Shravani Walekar (India)	(92–110) (10–11)	(Indonesia) Darren Aurelius (Indonesia) Bernadine Anindya Wardana

===== Japan vs United States =====
Japan (110–88) United States; Thursday, 3 October 2024, 15:30 UTC+8; Nanchang International Sports Center, Court 1
#	Category	Japan	Score (Partition score)	United States
1	WD	Ririna Hiramoto (Japan); Aya Tamaki (Japan)	(10–11) (10–11)	(United States) Chloe Ho (United States) Veronica Yang
2	MS	Kazuma Kawano (Japan)	(20–22) (10–11)	(United States) Garret Tan
3	XD	Kenta Matsukawa (Japan); Ririna Hiramoto (Japan)	(33–31) (13–9)	(United States) Kai Chong (United States) Stella Pan
4	WS	Mion Yokouchi (Japan)	(44–43) (11–12)	(United States) Ella Lin
5	MD	Renjiro Inagawa (Japan); Daichi Miura (Japan)	(55–51) (11–8)	(United States) Weslie Chen (United States) Kai Chong
6	WD	Mikoto Aiso (Japan); Rin Ueno (Japan)	(66–55) (11–4)	(United States) Chloe Ho (United States) Veronica Yang
7	MS	Rui Yamada (Japan)	(77–70) (11–15)	(United States) Garret Tan
8	XD	Shuji Sawada (Japan); Aya Tamaki (Japan)	(88–78) (11–8)	(United States) Kai Chong (United States) Stella Pan
9	WS	Niina Matsuta (Japan)	(99–83) (11–5)	(United States) Ella Lin
10	MD	Kenta Matsukawa (Japan); Yuto Nakashizu (Japan)	(110–88) (11–5)	(United States) Weslie Chen (United States) Kai Chong

==== 1st to 4th semifinals ====
===== China vs Malaysia =====
China (110–76) Malaysia; Friday, 4 October 2024, 14:00 UTC+8; Nanchang International Sports Center, Court 1
#	Category	China	Score (Partition score)	Malaysia
1	WS	Xu Wenjing (China)	(10–11) (10–11)	(Malaysia) Ong Xin Yee
2	MS	Hu Zhe'an (China)	(22–14) (12–3)	(Malaysia) Muhammad Faiq
3	XD	Lin Xiangyi (China); Liu Yuanyuan (China)	(33–16) (11–2)	(Malaysia) Datu Anif Isaac Datu Asrah (Malaysia) Dania Sofea
4	MD	Hu Keyuan (China); Lin Xiangyi (China)	(44–25) (11–9)	(Malaysia) Muhammad Faiq (Malaysia) Lok Hong Quan
5	WD	Chen Fanshutian (China); Liu Jiayue (China)	(55–38) (11–13)	(Malaysia) Dania Sofea (Malaysia) Carmen Ting
6	WS	Xu Wenjing (China)	(66–40) (11–2)	(Malaysia) Ong Xin Yee
7	MS	Hu Zhe'an (China)	(77–45) (11–5)	(Malaysia) Muhammad Faiq
8	XD	Lin Xiangyi (China); Liu Yuanyuan (China)	(88–59) (11–14)	(Malaysia) Aaron Tai (Malaysia) Noraqilah Maisarah
9	MD	Hu Keyuan (China); Lin Xiangyi (China)	(99–70) (11–11)	(Malaysia) Kang Khai Xing (Malaysia) Aaron Tai
10	WD	Chen Fanshutian (China); Liu Jiayue (China)	(110–76) (11–6)	(Malaysia) Ong Xin Yee (Malaysia) Carmen Ting

===== Indonesia vs Japan =====
Indonesia (110–105) Japan; Friday, 4 October 2024, 16:00 UTC+8; Nanchang International Sports Center, Court 1
#	Category	Indonesia	Score (Partition score)	Japan
1	WD	Isyana Syahira Meida (Indonesia); Rinjani Kwinara Nastine (Indonesia)	(11–6) (11–6)	(Japan) Mikoto Aiso (Japan) Rin Ueno
2	MS	Zaki Ubaidillah (Indonesia)	(22–16) (11–10)	(Japan) Kazuma Kawano
3	XD	Darren Aurelius (Indonesia); Bernadine Anindya Wardana (Indonesia)	(33–22) (11–6)	(Japan) Rui Yamada (Japan) Mikoto Aiso
4	WS	Mutiara Ayu Puspitasari (Indonesia)	(44–34) (11–12)	(Japan) Mion Yokouchi
5	MD	Dexter Farrell (Indonesia); Wahyu Agung Prasetyo (Indonesia)	(55–51) (11–17)	(Japan) Renjiro Inagawa (Japan) Daichi Miura
6	WD	Isyana Syahira Meida (Indonesia); Rinjani Kwinara Nastine (Indonesia)	(66–59) (11–8)	(Japan) Ririna Hiramoto (Japan) Aya Tamaki
7	MS	Richie Duta Richardo (Indonesia)	(77–72) (11–13)	(Japan) Kazuma Kawano
8	XD	Darren Aurelius (Indonesia); Bernadine Anindya Wardana (Indonesia)	(88–84) (11–12)	(Japan) Shuji Sawada (Japan) Aya Tamaki
9	WS	Mutiara Ayu Puspitasari (Indonesia)	(99–93) (11–9)	(Japan) Niina Matsuta
10	MD	Anselmus Prasetya (Indonesia); Pulung Ramadhan (Indonesia)	(110–105) (11–12)	(Japan) Kenta Matsukawa (Japan) Yuto Nakashizu

==== Finals ====
===== China vs Indonesia =====
China (103–110) Indonesia; Saturday, 5 October 2024, 15:00 UTC+8; Nanchang International Sports Center, Court 1
#	Category	China	Score (Partition score)	Indonesia
1	WS	Xu Wenjing (China)	(11–7) (11–7)	(Indonesia) Mutiara Ayu Puspitasari
2	WD	Chen Fanshutian (China); Liu Jiayue (China)	(15–22) (4–15)	(Indonesia) Isyana Syahira Meida (Indonesia) Rinjani Kwinara Nastine
3	XD	Lin Xiangyi (China); Liu Yuanyuan (China)	(31–33) (16–11)	(Indonesia) Darren Aurelius (Indonesia) Bernadine Anindya Wardana
4	MS	Hu Zhe'an (China)	(40–44) (9–11)	(Indonesia) Zaki Ubaidillah
5	MD	Hu Keyuan (China); Lin Xiangyi (China)	(48–55) (8–11)	(Indonesia) Anselmus Prasetya (Indonesia) Pulung Ramadhan
6	WS	Xu Wenjing (China)	(55–66) (7–11)	(Indonesia) Mutiara Ayu Puspitasari
7	WD	Chen Fanshutian (China); Liu Jiayue (China)	(62–77) (7–11)	(Indonesia) Isyana Syahira Meida (Indonesia) Rinjani Kwinara Nastine
8	XD	Lin Xiangyi (China); Liu Yuanyuan (China)	(77–88) (15–11)	(Indonesia) Darren Aurelius (Indonesia) Bernadine Anindya Wardana
9	MS	Hu Zhe'an (China)	(87–99) (10–11)	(Indonesia) Zaki Ubaidillah
10	MD	Hu Keyuan (China); Lin Xiangyi (China)	(103–110) (16–11)	(Indonesia) Anselmus Prasetya (Indonesia) Pulung Ramadhan

=== 9th to 16th ===
13th–14th place match
A	South Korea	110
E	Turkey	82
15th–16th place match
C	Estonia	108
G	England	110

13th to 16th semifinals
A	South Korea	110
C	Estonia	64
E	Turkey	110
G	England	71

9th to 16th quarterfinals
A	South Korea	93
B	France	110
C	Estonia	91
D	United Arab Emirates	110
E	Turkey	106
F	Poland	110
G	England	84
H	Thailand	110

9th to 12th semifinals
B	France	110
D	United Arab Emirates	108
F	Poland	77
H	Thailand	110

9th–10th place match
B	France	86
H	Thailand	110
11th–12th place match
D	United Arab Emirates	110
F	Poland	95

==== 11th to 12th place ====
===== United Arab Emirates vs Poland =====
United Arab Emirates (110–95) Poland; Saturday, 5 October 2024, 15:00 UTC+8; Nanchang International Sports Center, Court 3
#	Category	United Arab Emirates	Score (Partition score)	Poland
1	WD	Taralaxmi Karthikeyan (United Arab Emirates); Sakshi Kurbkhelgi (United Arab Emirates)	(5–11) (5–11)	(Poland) Alicja Syrek (Poland) Kaja Ziółkowska
2	MD	Dev Ayyappan (United Arab Emirates); Dhiren Ayyappan (United Arab Emirates)	(21–22) (11–11)	(Poland) Mateusz Golas (Poland) Bartosz Puńko
3	WS	Sakshi Kurbkhelgi (United Arab Emirates)	(32–33) (11–11)	(Poland) Alicja Syrek
4	XD	Dhiren Ayyappan (United Arab Emirates); Taabia Khan (United Arab Emirates)	(44–37) (12–4)	(Poland) Krzysztof Podkowiński (Poland) Kinga Stokfisz
5	MS	Dev Vishnu (United Arab Emirates)	(55–39) (11–2)	(Poland) Bartosz Puńko
6	WD	Mysha Omer Khan (United Arab Emirates); Taabia Khan (United Arab Emirates)	(66–45) (11–6)	(Poland) Maja Janko (Poland) Kinga Stokfisz
7	MD	Dev Ayyappan (United Arab Emirates); Dhiren Ayyappan (United Arab Emirates)	(77–54) (11–9)	(Poland) Mikołaj Morawski (Poland) Krzysztof Podkowiński
8	WS	Mysha Omer Khan (United Arab Emirates)	(88–71) (11–17)	(Poland) Kaja Ziółkowska
9	XD	Dev Vishnu (United Arab Emirates); Taabia Khan (United Arab Emirates)	(99–79) (11–8)	(Poland) Mikołaj Morawski (Poland) Maja Janko
10	MS	Bharath Latheesh (United Arab Emirates)	(110–95) (11–16)	(Poland) Mateusz Golas

==== 9th to 10th place ====
===== France vs Thailand =====
France (86–110) Thailand; Saturday, 5 October 2024, 15:00 UTC+8; Nanchang International Sports Center, Court 8
#	Category	France	Score (Partition score)	Thailand
1	WS	Malya Hoareau (France)	(3–11) (3–11)	(Thailand) Pitchamon Opatniputh
2	WD	Agathe Cuevas (France); Camille Pognante (France)	(13–22) (10–11)	(Thailand) Passa-Orn Phannachet (Thailand) Naphachanok Utsanon
3	MS	Arthur Tatranov (France)	(19–33) (6–11)	(Thailand) Patcharakit Apiratchataset
4	MD	Thibault Gardon (France); Ewan Goulin (France)	(26–44) (7–11)	(Thailand) Eakanath Kitkawinroj (Thailand) Tankhun Setthaprasert
5	XD	Tom Lalot Trescarte (France); Elsa Jacob (France)	(41–55) (15–11)	(Thailand) Pannawat Jamtubtim (Thailand) Pannawee Polyiam
6	WS	Malya Hoareau (France)	(47–66) (6–11)	(Thailand) Pitchamon Opatniputh
7	WD	Elsa Jacob (France); Camille Pognante (France)	(55–77) (8–11)	(Thailand) Kodchaporn Chaichana (Thailand) Pannawee Polyiam
8	MS	Arthur Tatranov (France)	(58–88) (3–11)	(Thailand) Patcharakit Apiratchataset
9	MD	Thibault Gardon (France); Tom Lalot Trescarte (France)	(69–99) (11–11)	(Thailand) Sittisak Nadee (Thailand) Chayapat Piboon
10	XD	Thibault Gardon (France); Agathe Cuevas (France)	(86–110) (17–11)	(Thailand) Pannawat Jamtubtim (Thailand) Pannawee Polyiam

=== 17th to 24th ===
21st–22nd place match
B	Singapore	110
G	Slovenia	84
23rd–24th place match
C	Netherlands	110
E	Peru	85

21st to 24th semifinals
B	Singapore	110
C	Netherlands	89
E	Peru	106
G	Slovenia	110

17th to 24th quarterfinals
A	Hong Kong	110
B	Singapore	81
C	Netherlands	109
D	New Zealand	110
E	Peru	92
F	Sri Lanka	110
G	Slovenia	76
H	Vietnam	110

17th to 20th semifinals
A	Hong Kong	110
D	New Zealand	69
F	Sri Lanka	83
H	Vietnam	110

17th–18th place match
A	Hong Kong	97
H	Vietnam	110
19th–20th place match
D	New Zealand	97
F	Sri Lanka	110

=== 25th to 32nd ===
29th–30th place match
B	Slovakia	110
E	Mauritius	77
31st–32nd place match
D	Cook Islands	101
G	Latvia	110

29th to 32nd semifinals
B	Slovakia	110
D	Cook Islands	61
E	Mauritius	110
G	Latvia	88

25th to 32nd quarterfinals
A	Australia	110
B	Slovakia	91
C	Norway	110
D	Cook Islands	56
E	Mauritius	94
F	Macau	110
G	Latvia	51
H	Philippines	110

25th to 28th semifinals
A	Australia	110
C	Norway	89
F	Macau	70
H	Philippines	110

25th–26th place match
A	Australia	97
H	Philippines	110
27th–28th place match
C	Norway	110
F	Macau	91

=== 33rd to 40th ===
37th–38th place match
C	Mongolia	62
G	Uganda	110
39th–40th place match
A	Ghana	np
F	Northern Mariana Islands	w/o

37th to 40th semifinals
A	Ghana
C	Mongolia	w/o
F	Northern Mariana Islands	68
G	Uganda	110

33rd to 40th quarterfinals
A	Ghana
B	Armenia	w/o
C	Mongolia	106
D	Trinidad and Tobago	110
E	Azerbaijan	110
F	Northern Mariana Islands	52
G	Uganda	56
H	Portugal	110

33rd to 36th semifinals
B	Armenia	110
D	Trinidad and Tobago	86
E	Azerbaijan	82
H	Portugal	110

33rd–34th place match
B	Armenia	54
H	Portugal	110
35th–36th place match
D	Trinidad and Tobago	51
E	Azerbaijan	110

== Final standing ==
1. Indonesia
2. China
3. Malaysia
3. Japan
5. Chinese Taipei
6. India
7. United States
8. Denmark
9. Thailand
10. France
11. United Arab Emirates
12. Poland
13. South Korea
14. Turkey
15. England
16. Estonia
17. Vietnam
18. Hong Kong
19. Sri Lanka
20. New Zealand
21. Singapore
22. Slovenia
23. Netherlands
24. Peru
25. Philippines
26. Australia
27. Norway
28. Macau
29. Slovakia
30. Mauritius
31. Latvia
32. Cook Islands
33. Portugal
34. Armenia
35. Azerbaijan
36. Trinidad and Tobago
37. Uganda
38. Mongolia
39. Northern Mariana Islands

Source = TS
