= 2026 Oceania Men's & Women's Team Badminton Championships =

Tournament details
- Dates: 13–15 February
- Nations: 6 (Men's team); 6 (Women's team)
- Venue: Badminton North Harbour Centre
- Location: Auckland, New Zealand

The 2026 Oceania Men's & Women's Team Badminton Championships was a continental badminton team championships in Oceania sanctioned by the Badminton World Federation. The tournament was held from 13 to 15 February 2026.

== Tournament ==
The 2026 Oceania Men's & Women's Team Badminton Championships officially the Victor Oceania Men's and Women's Team Championships 2026, was a team continental championships tournament of badminton, to crown the best men's and women's team in Oceania, who would qualify to 2026 Thomas & Uber Cup. This tournament was organized by Badminton Oceania, with sanctioned of the Badminton World Federation.

=== Venue ===
The tournament was held at the Badminton North Harbour Centre in Auckland, New Zealand.

=== Competition format ===
The competition was held using a half-competition system (round-robin) with each team competing against each other once.

=== Tiebreakers ===
The rankings of teams in each group were determined per BWF Statutes Section 5.1, Article 16.3:

1. Number of matches won;
2. Match result between the teams in question;
3. Match difference in all group matches;
4. Game difference in all group matches;
5. Point difference in all group matches.

== Medal summary ==
=== Medalists ===
Event	Gold	Silver	Bronze
Men's team	Australia; Shrey Dhand; Rizky Hidayat; Andika Ramadiansyah; Ephraim Stephen Sam; Jack Yu; Frederick Zhao	New Zealand; Chris Benzie; Ricky Cheng; Jonathan Curtin; Raphael Chris Deloy; Adam Jeffrey; Edward Lau; Daniel McMillan; Dylan Soedjasa; Vincent Tao	Tahiti; Antoine Beaubois; Rauhiri Goguenheim; Yann Jeandroz; Elias Maublanc; Mike Mi You
Women's team	Australia; Jesslyn Carrisia; Tiffany Ho; Faye Huo; Gronya Somerville; Victoria Tjonadi; Angela Yu	New Zealand; Shaunna Li; Laura Lin; Yanxi Liu; Natalie Ting; Justine Villegas; Amy Wang; Josephine Zhao; Camellia Zhou; Jenny Zhu	Tahiti; Heirautea Curet; Mélissa Mi You; Myriam Siao; Esther Tau; Waianuhea Teheura

=== Medal table ===
* Host nation (New Zealand)

Rank	Nation	Gold	Silver	Bronze	Total
1	Australia	2	0	0	2
2	New Zealand*	0	2	0	2
3	Tahiti	0	0	2	2
Totals (3 entries)		2	2	2	6

== Men's team ==
Pos	Team	Pld	W	L	GF	GA	GD	PF	PA	PD	Pts	Qualification
1	Australia (Q)	5	5	0	49	4	+45	1102	544	+558	5	Qualified to 2026 Thomas Cup
2	New Zealand (H)	5	4	1	44	9	+35	1083	610	+473	4	
3	Tahiti	5	3	2	30	20	+10	871	755	+116	3	
4	New Caledonia	5	2	3	15	36	−21	676	935	−259	2	
5	Cook Islands	5	1	4	14	37	−23	636	997	−361	1	
6	Northern Mariana Islands	5	0	5	3	49	−46	553	1080	−527	0	

Source: Badminton World Federation
Rules for classification: Tiebreakers
(H) Host; (Q) Qualified to the phase indicated

=== New Zealand vs Northern Mariana Islands ===
New Zealand
5
Badminton North Harbour Centre, Court 1
13 February 2026, 12:00

Northern Mariana Islands
0

			1	2	3
1	(New Zealand) (Northern Mariana Islands)	Raphael Chris Deloy; Marlon Bautista	21; 7	21; 7
2	(New Zealand) (Northern Mariana Islands)	Jonathan Curtin; Dave Bryan Odicta	21; 7	21; 6
3	(New Zealand) (Northern Mariana Islands)	Daniel McMillan; Jude Mallari	21; 5	21; 4
4	(New Zealand) (Northern Mariana Islands)	Jonathan Curtin / Dylan Soedjasa; Marlon Bautista / Nolan Nate	21; 3	21; 6
5	(New Zealand) (Northern Mariana Islands)	Adam Jeffrey / Vincent Tao; Jude Mallari / Dave Bryan Odicta	21; 5	21; 13

=== Tahiti vs Cook Islands ===
Tahiti
5
Badminton North Harbour Centre, Court 2
13 February 2026, 12:00

Cook Islands
0

			1	2	3
1	(French Polynesia) (Cook Islands)	Mike Mi You; Brendan Lee	21; 15	21; 16
2	(French Polynesia) (Cook Islands)	Elias Maublanc; Daniel Akavi	21; 7	21; 11
3	(French Polynesia) (Cook Islands)	Rauhiri Goguenheim; Edward Patai	21; 11	21; 13
4	(French Polynesia) (Cook Islands)	Antoine Beaubois / Yann Jeandroz; Siaosi Cowan / David Piakura	21; 14	21; 4
5	(French Polynesia) (Cook Islands)	Elias Maublanc / Mike Mi You; Kaiyin Mataio / Edward Patai	21; 10	21; 13

=== Australia vs New Caledonia ===
Australia
5
Badminton North Harbour Centre, Court 3
13 February 2026, 12:00

New Caledonia
0

			1	2	3
1	(Australia) (New Caledonia)	Jack Yu; Nathan Nicole	21; 4	21; 5
2	(Australia) (New Caledonia)	Ephraim Stephen Sam; William Hnaissilin	21; 6	21; 6
3	(Australia) (New Caledonia)	Frederick Zhao; Jun Le Breton	21; 7	21; 5
4	(Australia) (New Caledonia)	Rizky Hidayat / Jack Yu; Joseph Guyenne / Carl N'Guela	21; 13	21; 5
5	(Australia) (New Caledonia)	Andika Ramadiansyah / Frederick Zhao; Alexandre Milesi / Jerome Milesi	21; 5	21; 9

=== Australia vs Tahiti ===
Australia
5
Badminton North Harbour Centre, Court 1
13 February 2026, 18:00

Tahiti
0

			1	2	3
1	(Australia) (French Polynesia)	Jack Yu; Antoine Beaubois	21; 15	21; 11
2	(Australia) (French Polynesia)	Ephraim Stephen Sam; Mike Mi You	21; 9	21; 7
3	(Australia) (French Polynesia)	Rizky Hidayat / Jack Yu; Antoine Beaubois / Yann Jeandroz	21; 8	21; 15
4	(Australia) (French Polynesia)	Shrey Dhand; Elias Maublanc	21; 13	21; 15
5	(Australia) (French Polynesia)	Andika Ramadiansyah / Frederick Zhao; Rauhiri Goguenheim / Mike Mi You	21; 9	21; 4

=== Cook Islands vs Northern Mariana Islands ===
Cook Islands
5
Badminton North Harbour Centre, Court 2
13 February 2026, 18:00

Northern Mariana Islands
0

			1	2	3
1	(Cook Islands) (Northern Mariana Islands)	Brendan Lee; Marlon Bautista	21; 8	21; 8
2	(Cook Islands) (Northern Mariana Islands)	Kaiyin Mataio; Nolan Nate	21; 17	21; 17
3	(Cook Islands) (Northern Mariana Islands)	Daniel Akavi; Jude Mallari	24; 22	21; 15
4	(Cook Islands) (Northern Mariana Islands)	Emanuela Mataio / Kaiyin Mataio; Marlon Bautista / Nolan Nate	21; 16	21; 19
5	(Cook Islands) (Northern Mariana Islands)	Daniel Akavi / David Piakura; Jude Mallari / Dave Bryan Odicta	21; 18	14; 21	21; 17

=== New Zealand vs New Caledonia ===
New Zealand
5
Badminton North Harbour Centre, Court 3
13 February 2026, 18:00

New Caledonia
0

			1	2	3
1	(New Zealand) (New Caledonia)	Raphael Chris Deloy; Theo Bourgeois	21; 6	21; 10
2	(New Zealand) (New Caledonia)	Daniel McMillan; Joseph Guyenne	21; 12	21; 10
3	(New Zealand) (New Caledonia)	Jonathan Curtin / Vincent Tao; Theo Bourgeois / Jun Le Breton	21; 7	21; 1
4	(New Zealand) (New Caledonia)	Dylan Soedjasa; Carl N'Guela	21; 10	21; 7
5	(New Zealand) (New Caledonia)	Raphael Chris Deloy / Adam Jeffrey; William Hnaissilin / Nathan Nicole	21; 9	21; 10

=== New Zealand vs Tahiti ===
New Zealand
5
Badminton North Harbour Centre, Court 1
14 February 2026, 12:00

Tahiti
0

			1	2	3
1	(New Zealand) (French Polynesia)	Edward Lau; Antoine Beaubois	21; 12	21; 10
2	(New Zealand) (French Polynesia)	Chris Benzie; Mike Mi You	21; 6	21; 11
3	(New Zealand) (French Polynesia)	Daniel McMillan; Elias Maublanc	21; 16	21; 18
4	(New Zealand) (French Polynesia)	Raphael Chris Deloy / Vincent Tao; Rauhiri Goguenheim / Yann Jeandroz	21; 17	21; 13
5	(New Zealand) (French Polynesia)	Ricky Cheng / Dylan Soedjasa; Antoine Beaubois / Elias Maublanc	21; 18	21; 14

=== Northern Mariana Islands vs New Caledonia ===
Northern Mariana Islands
1
Badminton North Harbour Centre, Court 2
14 February 2026, 12:00

New Caledonia
4

			1	2	3
1	(Northern Mariana Islands) (New Caledonia)	Marlon Bautista; Theo Bourgeois	18; 21	21; 18	21; 16
2	(Northern Mariana Islands) (New Caledonia)	Dave Bryan Odicta; Carl N'Guela	8; 21	7; 21
3	(Northern Mariana Islands) (New Caledonia)	Nolan Nate; Joseph Guyenne	12; 21	15; 21
4	(Northern Mariana Islands) (New Caledonia)	Jude Mallari / Dave Bryan Odicta; Alexandre Milesi / Jerome Milesi	18; 21	13; 21
5	(Northern Mariana Islands) (New Caledonia)	Marlon Bautista / Nolan Nate; Joseph Guyenne / Carl N'Guela	3; 21	13; 21

=== Australia vs Cook Islands ===
Australia
5
Badminton North Harbour Centre, Court 3
14 February 2026, 12:00

Cook Islands
0

			1	2	3
1	(Australia) (Cook Islands)	Ephraim Stephen Sam; Brendan Lee	21; 15	21; 2
2	(Australia) (Cook Islands)	Shrey Dhand; Kaiyin Mataio	21; 10	21; 10
3	(Australia) (Cook Islands)	Frederick Zhao; Edward Patai	21; 5	21; 9
4	(Australia) (Cook Islands)	Rizky Hidayat / Ephraim Stephen Sam; Daniel Akavi / David Piakura	21; 6	21; 5
5	(Australia) (Cook Islands)	Andika Ramadiansyah / Frederick Zhao; Siaosi Cowan / Emanuela Mataio	21; 3	21; 6

=== Australia vs Northern Mariana Islands ===
Australia
5
Badminton North Harbour Centre, Court 1
14 February 2026, 18:00

Northern Mariana Islands
0

			1	2	3
1	(Australia) (Northern Mariana Islands)	Jack Yu; Marlon Bautista	21; 2	21; 6
2	(Australia) (Northern Mariana Islands)	Ephraim Stephen Sam; Nolan Nate	21; 4	21; 9
3	(Australia) (Northern Mariana Islands)	Shrey Dhand; Jude Mallari	21; 8	21; 7
4	(Australia) (Northern Mariana Islands)	Rizky Hidayat / Jack Yu; Marlon Bautista / Nolan Nate	21; 4	21; 5
5	(Australia) (Northern Mariana Islands)	Andika Ramadiansyah / Frederick Zhao; Jude Dominguez Mallari / Dave Bryan Odicta	21; 5	21; 9

=== Tahiti vs New Caledonia ===
Tahiti
5
Badminton North Harbour Centre, Court 2
14 February 2026, 18:00

New Caledonia
0

			1	2	3
1	(French Polynesia) (New Caledonia)	Antoine Beaubois; Joseph Guyenne	21; 15	21; 12
2	(French Polynesia) (New Caledonia)	Mike Mi You; Jerome Milesi	21; 17	21; 3
3	(French Polynesia) (New Caledonia)	Elias Maublanc; Carl N'Guela	21; 10	21; 11
4	(French Polynesia) (New Caledonia)	Elias Maublanc / Mike Mi You; Alexandre Milesi / Thommy Sargito	21; 16	21; 17
5	(French Polynesia) (New Caledonia)	Antoine Beaubois / Yann Jeandroz; Joseph Guyenne / Carl N'Guela	21; 7	21; 9

=== New Zealand vs Cook Islands ===
New Zealand
5
Badminton North Harbour Centre, Court 3
14 February 2026, 18:00

Cook Islands
0

			1	2	3
1	(New Zealand) (Cook Islands)	Ricky Cheng; Brendan Lee	21; 13	21; 9
2	(New Zealand) (Cook Islands)	Jonathan Curtin; Emanuela Mataio	21; 4	21; 7
3	(New Zealand) (Cook Islands)	Raphael Chris Deloy / Adam Jeffrey; Daniel Akavi / David Piakura	21; 7	21; 7
4	(New Zealand) (Cook Islands)	Daniel McMillan; Siaosi Cowan	21; 4	21; 7
5	(New Zealand) (Cook Islands)	Jonathan Curtin / Vincent Tao; Kaiyin Mataio / Edward Patai	21; 3	21; 7

=== Australia vs New Zealand ===
Australia
4
Badminton North Harbour Centre, Court 1
15 February 2026, 13:00

New Zealand
1

			1	2	3
1	(Australia) (New Zealand)	Jack Yu; Edward Lau	21; 16	18; 21	18; 21
2	(Australia) (New Zealand)	Andika Ramadiansyah / Frederick Zhao; Raphael Chris Deloy / Adam Jeffrey	21; 15	17; 21	23; 21
3	(Australia) (New Zealand)	Ephraim Stephen Sam; Chris Benzie	21; 18	16; 21	21; 16
4	(Australia) (New Zealand)	Rizky Hidayat / Jack Yu; Dylan Soedjasa / Vincent Tao	21; 18	21; 17
5	(Australia) (New Zealand)	Shrey Dhand; Ricky Cheng	23; 21	21; 17

=== Cook Islands vs New Caledonia ===
Cook Islands
2
Badminton North Harbour Centre, Court 2
15 February 2026, 13:00

New Caledonia
3

			1	2	3
1	(Cook Islands) (New Caledonia)	Brendan Lee; Theo Bourgeois	21; 18	21; 13
2	(Cook Islands) (New Caledonia)	Daniel Akavi; Carl N'Guela	10; 21	10; 21
3	(Cook Islands) (New Caledonia)	Kaiyin Mataio; Joseph Guyenne	21; 12	22; 20
4	(Cook Islands) (New Caledonia)	Daniel Akavi / David Piakura; William Hnaissilin / Nathan Nicole	19; 21	12; 21
5	(Cook Islands) (New Caledonia)	Emanuela Mataio / Kaiyin Mataio; Joseph Guyenne / Carl N'Guela	8; 21	12; 21

=== Tahiti vs Northern Mariana Islands ===
Tahiti
5
Badminton North Harbour Centre, Court 3
15 February 2026, 13:00

Northern Mariana Islands
0

			1	2	3
1	(French Polynesia) (Northern Mariana Islands)	Antoine Beaubois; Nolan Nate	21; 4	21; 10
2	(French Polynesia) (Northern Mariana Islands)	Mike Mi You; Dave Bryan Odicta	21; 10	21; 10
3	(French Polynesia) (Northern Mariana Islands)	Rauhiri Goguenheim; Jude Mallari	21; 10	21; 11
4	(French Polynesia) (Northern Mariana Islands)	Elias Maublanc / Mike Mi You; Marlon Bautista / Nolan Nate	21; 14	21; 9
5	(French Polynesia) (Northern Mariana Islands)	Antoine Beaubois / Rauhiri Goguenheim; Jude Mallari / Dave Bryan Odicta	21; 12	21; 14

== Women's team ==
Pos	Team	Pld	W	L	GF	GA	GD	PF	PA	PD	Pts	Qualification
1	Australia (Q)	5	5	0	48	4	+44	1078	412	+666	5	Qualified to 2026 Uber Cup
2	New Zealand (H)	5	4	1	44	8	+36	1059	527	+532	4	
3	Tahiti	5	3	2	30	21	+9	843	760	+83	3	
4	Northern Mariana Islands	5	2	3	17	35	−18	612	968	−356	2	
5	Cook Islands	5	1	4	8	45	−37	553	1072	−519	1	
6	New Caledonia	5	0	5	10	44	−34	646	1052	−406	0	

Source: Badminton World Federation
Rules for classification: Tiebreakers
(H) Host; (Q) Qualified to the phase indicated

=== Cook Islands vs New Caledonia ===
Cook Islands
3
Badminton North Harbour Centre, Court 1
13 February 2026, 09:00

New Caledonia
2

			1	2	3
1	(Cook Islands) (New Caledonia)	Lana Toa; Camille Giusti	21; 18	14; 21	21; 13
2	(Cook Islands) (New Caledonia)	Tuaine Nicholas-Herman; Laurene Benlahoussine	14; 21	21; 16	13; 21
3	(Cook Islands) (New Caledonia)	Morani Karika; Ashley Desert	21; 14	21; 17
4	(Cook Islands) (New Caledonia)	Tuaine Nicholas-Herman / Lana Toa; Laurene Benlahoussine / Julie Wongsodjirono	17; 21	8; 21
5	(Cook Islands) (New Caledonia)	Tereapii Akavi / Morani Karika; Camille Giusti / Kimberley Moraldo	21; 8	21; 19

=== New Zealand vs Northern Mariana Islands ===
New Zealand
5
Badminton North Harbour Centre, Court 2
13 February 2026, 09:00

Northern Mariana Islands
0

			1	2	3
1	(New Zealand) (Northern Mariana Islands)	Amy Wang; Genelyn Lansangan	21; 8	21; 3
2	(New Zealand) (Northern Mariana Islands)	Josephine Zhao; Shaina Malonzo	21; 4	21; 7
3	(New Zealand) (Northern Mariana Islands)	Camellia Zhou / Jenny Zhu; Danielle Joson / Keala Takeda	21; 2	21; 5
4	(New Zealand) (Northern Mariana Islands)	Yanxi Liu; Monique Mascarinas	21; 3	21; 3
5	(New Zealand) (Northern Mariana Islands)	Laura Lin / Natalie Ting; Genelyn Lansangan / Shaina Malonzo	21; 11	21; 11

=== Australia vs Tahiti ===
Australia
5
Badminton North Harbour Centre, Court 3
13 February 2026, 09:00

Tahiti
0

			1	2	3
1	(Australia) (French Polynesia)	Tiffany Ho; Heirautea Curet	21; 16	21; 19
2	(Australia) (French Polynesia)	Gronya Somerville; Waianuhea Teheura	21; 5	21; 1
3	(Australia) (French Polynesia)	Victoria Tjonadi; Myriam Siao	21; 3	21; 5
4	(Australia) (French Polynesia)	Tiffany Ho / Angela Yu; Heirautea Curet / Waianuhea Teheura	21; 6	21; 13
5	(Australia) (French Polynesia)	Faye Huo / Gronya Somerville; Melissa Mi You / Esther Tau	21; 5	21; 7

=== Australia vs Cook Islands ===
Australia
5
Badminton North Harbour Centre, Court 1
13 February 2026, 15:00

Cook Islands
0

			1	2	3
1	(Australia) (Cook Islands)	Tiffany Ho; Lana Toa	21; 5	21; 1
2	(Australia) (Cook Islands)	Jesslyn Carrisia; Morani Karika	21; 3	21; 7
3	(Australia) (Cook Islands)	Faye Huo; Tuaine Nicholas-Herman	21; 6	21; 4
4	(Australia) (Cook Islands)	Gronya Somerville / Victoria Tjonadi; Teatuanui George / Lana Toa	21; 1	21; 2
5	(Australia) (Cook Islands)	Jesslyn Carrisia / Angela Yu; Tereapii Akavi / Morani Karika	21; 7	21; 2

=== New Caledonia vs Northern Mariana Islands ===
New Caledonia
2
Badminton North Harbour Centre, Court 2
13 February 2026, 15:00

Northern Mariana Islands
3

			1	2	3
1	(New Caledonia) (Northern Mariana Islands)	Camille Giusti; Genelyn Lansangan	15; 21	8; 21
2	(New Caledonia) (Northern Mariana Islands)	Laurene Benlahoussine; Shaina Malonzo	12; 21	21; 17	18; 21
3	(New Caledonia) (Northern Mariana Islands)	Julie Wongsodjirono; Monique Mascarinas	21; 12	21; 4
4	(New Caledonia) (Northern Mariana Islands)	Camille Giusti / Kimberley Moraldo; Danielle Joson / Janelle Pangilinan	16; 21	15; 21
5	(New Caledonia) (Northern Mariana Islands)	Laurene Benlahoussine / Julie Wongsodjirono; Genelyn Lansangan / Shaina Malonzo	18; 21	21; 17	21; 12

=== New Zealand vs Tahiti ===
New Zealand
5
Badminton North Harbour Centre, Court 3
13 February 2026, 15:00

Tahiti
0

			1	2	3
1	(New Zealand) (French Polynesia)	Amy Wang; Heirautea Curet	21; 16	21; 15
2	(New Zealand) (French Polynesia)	Josephine Zhao; Melissa Mi You	21; 17	21; 8
3	(New Zealand) (French Polynesia)	Yanxi Liu; Myriam Siao	21; 6	21; 4
4	(New Zealand) (French Polynesia)	Laura Lin / Justine Villegas; Heirautea Curet / Esther Tau	21; 18	21; 9
5	(New Zealand) (French Polynesia)	Shaunna Li / Natalie Ting; Myriam Siao / Waianuhea Teheura	21; 9	21; 9

=== Northern Mariana Islands ===
Northern Mariana Islands
0
Badminton North Harbour Centre, Court 1
14 February 2026, 09:00

Tahiti
5

			1	2	3
1	(Northern Mariana Islands) (French Polynesia)	Genelyn Lansangan; Heirautea Curet	8; 21	2; 21
2	(Northern Mariana Islands) (French Polynesia)	Shaina Malonzo; Melissa Mi You	14; 21	16; 21
3	(Northern Mariana Islands) (French Polynesia)	Danielle Joson; Myriam Siao	1; 21	5; 21
4	(Northern Mariana Islands) (French Polynesia)	Genelyn Lansangan / Shaina Malonzo; Heirautea Curet / Waianuhea Teheura	10; 21	18; 21
5	(Northern Mariana Islands) (French Polynesia)	Monique Mascarinas / Keala Takeda; Melissa Mi You / Esther Tau	8; 21	5; 21

=== New Zealand vs Cook Islands ===
New Zealand
5
Badminton North Harbour Centre, Court 2
14 February 2026, 09:00

Cook Islands
0

			1	2	3
1	(New Zealand) (Cook Islands)	Jenny Zhu; Lana Toa	21; 8	21; 1
2	(New Zealand) (Cook Islands)	Amy Wang; Tuaine Nicholas-Herman	21; 5	21; 4
3	(New Zealand) (Cook Islands)	Laura Lin / Josephine Zhao; Tereapii Akavi / Teatuanui George	21; 4	21; 4
4	(New Zealand) (Cook Islands)	Yanxi Liu; Morani Karika	21; 6	21; 4
5	(New Zealand) (Cook Islands)	Justine Villegas / Camellia Zhu; Tuaine Nicholas-Herman / Lana Toa	21; 4	21; 8

=== Australia vs New Caledonia ===
Australia
5
Badminton North Harbour Centre, Court 3
14 February 2026, 09:00

New Caledonia
0

			1	2	3
1	(Australia) (New Caledonia)	Tiffany Ho; Laurene Benlahoussine	21; 3	21; 1
2	(Australia) (New Caledonia)	Faye Huo; Ashley Desert	21; 2	21; 2
3	(Australia) (New Caledonia)	Tiffany Ho / Gronya Somerville; Camille Giusti / Julie Wongsodjirono	21; 3	21; 4
4	(Australia) (New Caledonia)	Jesslyn Carrisia; Kimberley Moraldo	21; 5	21; 4
5	(Australia) (New Caledonia)	Victoria Tjonadi / Angela Yu; Laurene Benlahoussine / Ashley Desert	21; 0	21; 2

=== Cook Islands vs Tahiti ===
Cook Islands
0
Badminton North Harbour Centre, Court 1
14 February 2026, 15:00

Tahiti
5

			1	2	3
1	(Cook Islands) (French Polynesia)	Lana Toa; Heirautea Curet	7; 21	5; 21
2	(Cook Islands) (French Polynesia)	Tuaine Nicholas-Herman; Myriam Siao	24; 22	13; 21	13; 21
3	(Cook Islands) (French Polynesia)	Morani Karika; Waianuhea Teheura	16; 21	10; 21
4	(Cook Islands) (French Polynesia)	Teatuanui George / Tuaine Nicholas-Herman; Heirautea Curet / Esther Tau	3; 11			retired
5	(Cook Islands) (French Polynesia)	Tereapii Akavi / Morani Karika; MéIissa Mi You / Myriam Siao	16; 21	16; 21

=== Australia vs Northern Mariana Islands ===
Australia
5
Badminton North Harbour Centre, Court 2
14 February 2026, 15:00

Northern Mariana Islands
0

			1	2	3
1	(Australia) (Northern Mariana Islands)	Faye Huo; Genelyn Lansangan	21; 3	21; 6
2	(Australia) (Northern Mariana Islands)	Victoria Tjonadi; Shaina Malonzo	21; 6	21; 7
3	(Australia) (Northern Mariana Islands)	Jesslyn Carrisia; Danielle Joson	21; 2	21; 5
4	(Australia) (Northern Mariana Islands)	Gronya Somerville / Angela Yu; Genelyn Lansangan / Shaina Malonzo	21; 2	21; 9
5	(Australia) (Northern Mariana Islands)	Tiffany Ho / Faye Huo; Danielle Joson / Keala Takeda	21; 4	21; 5

=== New Zealand vs New Caledonia ===
New Zealand
5
Badminton North Harbour Centre, Court 3
14 February 2026, 15:00

New Caledonia
0

			1	2	3
1	(New Zealand) (New Caledonia)	Amy Wang; Camille Giusti	21; 8	21; 4
2	(New Zealand) (New Caledonia)	Josephine Zhao; Laurene Benlahoussine	21; 6	21; 3
3	(New Zealand) (New Caledonia)	Yanxi Liu; Ashley Desert	21; 3	21; 7
4	(New Zealand) (New Caledonia)	Natalie Ting / Justine Villegas; Laurene Benlahoussine / Julie Wongsodjirono	21; 9	21; 14
5	(New Zealand) (New Caledonia)	Camellia Zhou / Jenny Zhu; Ashley Desert / Kimberley Moraldo	21; 8	21; 11

=== Australia vs New Zealand ===
Australia
4
Badminton North Harbour Centre, Court 1
15 February 2026, 09:00

New Zealand
1

			1	2	3
1	(Australia) (New Zealand)	Tiffany Ho; Shaunna Li	13; 21	19; 21
2	(Australia) (New Zealand)	Faye Huo; Amy Wang	21; 11	22; 20
3	(Australia) (New Zealand)	Jesslyn Carrisia; Josephine Zhao	21; 19	21; 16
4	(Australia) (New Zealand)	Faye Huo / Gronya Somerville; Natalie Ting / Camellia Zhou	21; 18	19; 21	21; 17
5	(Australia) (New Zealand)	Jesslyn Carrisia / Angela Yu; Shaunna Li / Laura Lin	21; 14	17; 21	22; 20

=== Cook Islands vs Northern Mariana Islands ===
Cook Islands
0
Badminton North Harbour Centre, Court 2
15 February 2026, 09:00

Northern Mariana Islands
5

			1	2	3
1	(Cook Islands) (Northern Mariana Islands)	Lana Toa; Lina Tsukagoshi	16; 21	16; 21
2	(Cook Islands) (Northern Mariana Islands)	Tereapii Akavi; Shaina Malonzo	5; 21	9; 21
3	(Cook Islands) (Northern Mariana Islands)	Morani Karika; Genelyn Lansangan	16; 21	14; 21
4	(Cook Islands) (Northern Mariana Islands)	Teatuanui George / Lana Toa; Shaina Malonzo / Lina Tsukagoshi	13; 21	12; 21
5	(Cook Islands) (Northern Mariana Islands)	Tereapii Akavi / Morani Karika; Genelyn Lansangan / Janelle Pangilinan	18; 21	12; 21

=== New Caledonia vs Tahiti ===
New Caledonia
0
Badminton North Harbour Centre
15 February 2026, 09:00

Tahiti
5

			1	2	3
1	(New Caledonia) (French Polynesia)	Camille Giusti; Heirautea Curet	5; 21	2; 21
2	(New Caledonia) (French Polynesia)	Laurene Benlahoussine; Esther Tau	7; 21	15; 21
3	(New Caledonia) (French Polynesia)	Julie Wongsodjirono; MéIissa Mi You	17; 21	16; 21
4	(New Caledonia) (French Polynesia)	Ashley Desert / Camille Giusti; Myriam Siao / Esther Tau	15; 21	18; 21
5	(New Caledonia) (French Polynesia)	Laurene Benlahoussine / Julie Wongsodjirono; MéIissa Mi You / Waianuhea Teheura	17; 21	18; 21
