= 2023 Oceania Badminton Championships =

Tournament details
- Dates: 13–16 February (individual event); 17–19 February (team event)
- Edition: 17th
- Venue: Auckland Badminton Stadium
- Location: Epsom, Auckland, New Zealand

The 2023 Oceania Badminton Championships was a continental badminton championships in Oceania sanctioned by the Badminton Oceania, and Badminton World Federation. The individual and mixed team events were held from 13 to 16 and 17 to 19 February 2023, respectively.

== Venue ==
The tournament was held at the Auckland Badminton Stadium, Auckland, New Zealand.

== Medal summary ==
=== Medalists ===
Event	Gold	Silver	Bronze
Men's singles	(New Zealand) Abhinav Manota	(New Zealand) Edward Lau	(Australia) Jacob Schueler
Men's singles	(New Zealand) Abhinav Manota	(New Zealand) Edward Lau	(French Polynesia) Rémi Rossi
Women's singles	(New Zealand) Shaunna Li	(Australia) Tiffany Ho	(Australia) Bernice Teoh
Women's singles	(New Zealand) Shaunna Li	(Australia) Tiffany Ho	(Australia) Louisa Ma
Men's doubles	(Australia) Kenneth Choo (Australia) Rayne Wang	(New Zealand) Alan Chan (New Zealand) Chance Cheng	(Australia) Keith Mark Edison (Australia) Mitchell Wheller
Men's doubles	(Australia) Kenneth Choo (Australia) Rayne Wang	(New Zealand) Alan Chan (New Zealand) Chance Cheng	(Australia) Lim Ming Chuen (Australia) Jack Yu
Women's doubles	(Australia) Sylvina Kurniawan (Australia) Setyana Mapasa	(Australia) Tiffany Ho (Australia) Khoo Lee Yen	(Australia) Joyce Choong (Australia) Gronya Somerville
Women's doubles	(Australia) Sylvina Kurniawan (Australia) Setyana Mapasa	(Australia) Tiffany Ho (Australia) Khoo Lee Yen	(Australia) Priska Kustiadi (Australia) Carina Sam
Mixed doubles	(Australia) Kenneth Choo (Australia) Gronya Somerville	(Australia) Lim Ming Chuen (Australia) Sylvina Kurniawan	(Australia) Gavin Kyjac Ong (Australia) Khoo Lee Yen
Mixed doubles	(Australia) Kenneth Choo (Australia) Gronya Somerville	(Australia) Lim Ming Chuen (Australia) Sylvina Kurniawan	(Australia) Ricky Tang (Australia) Kaitlyn Ea
Mixed team	Australia; Kenneth Choo; Joyce Choong; Kaitlyn Ea; Tiffany Ho; Lim Ming Chuen; Louisa Ma; Jacob Schueler; Gronya Somerville; Nathan Tang; Jack Yu	New Zealand; Erena Calder-Hawkins; Adam Jeffrey; Edward Lau; Shaunna Li; Abhinav Manota; Anona Pak; Dylan Soedjasa; Justine Villegas; Jack Wang; Camellia Zhou	New Caledonia; Soizick Ho-Yagues; Lucas Juillot; Jeremy Lemaitre; Dgenyva Matauli; Marine Souviat; Ronan Ho-Yagues; Johanna Kou

=== Medal table ===
* Host nation (New Zealand)

Rank	Nation	Gold	Silver	Bronze	Total
1	Australia	4	3	9	16
2	New Zealand*	2	3	0	5
3	New Caledonia	0	0	1	1
3	Tahiti	0	0	1	1
Totals (4 entries)		6	6	11	23

== Men's singles ==
=== Seeds ===
1. (Australia) Nathan Tang (quarter-finals)
2. (New Zealand) Edward Lau (final)
3. (Australia) Adam Dolman (third round)
4. (Australia) Jacob Schueler (semi-finals)
5. (New Zealand) Abhinav Manota (champion)
6. (New Zealand) Ricky Cheng (third round)
7. (Australia) Athi Selladurai (third round)
8. (Australia) Pit Seng Low (third round)

=== Finals ===
Semi-finals
5	(New Zealand) Abhinav Manota	21	21
4	(Australia) Jacob Schueler	12	19
(French Polynesia) Rémi Rossi	19	15
2	(New Zealand) Edward Lau	21	21

Final
5	(New Zealand) Abhinav Manota	21	21
2	(New Zealand) Edward Lau	12	16

=== Top half ===
==== Section 1 ====
First round
(French Polynesia) H Yvonet	13	13
(New Zealand) J Jiang	21	21
(New Zealand) YF Zhang	7	9
(Australia) K M Edison	21	21
(Australia) J Yu	21	21
(French Polynesia) T Politi	3	9
(Australia) K C Teoh	21	21
(New Zealand) J Virk	13	6
(New Zealand) A Rouse	21	21
(Cook Islands) D Matakino	7	5

Second round
1	(Australia) N Tang	21	22
(New Zealand) J Jiang	11	20
(Tonga) S Molitika	3	7
(Australia) K M Edison	21	21
5	(New Zealand) A Manota	21	21
(Australia) J Yu	14	10
(Australia) K C Teoh	21	21
(New Zealand) A Rouse	12	10

Third round
1	(Australia) N Tang	15	21	21
(Australia) K M Edison	21	7	16
5	(New Zealand) A Manota	21	18	21
(Australia) K C Teoh	14	21	17

Quarter-finals
1	(Australia) N Tang	14	19
5	(New Zealand) A Manota	21	21

==== Section 2 ====
First round
(New Zealand) P Tayalan	13	13
(Australia) H K Oon	21	21
(Australia) J Lee	21	21
(New Zealand) B Cox	13	11
(New Zealand) A Shastri	21	21
(French Polynesia) R Goubin	13	7
(New Zealand) N Tagle	21	21
(Australia) A Martin	7	7
(Northern Mariana Islands) L Manuel	w	/	o
(New Caledonia) R Ho-Yagues

Second round
4	(Australia) J Schueler	21	21
(Australia) H K Oon	18	18
(Cook Islands) M Maretapu	5	4
(Australia) J Lee	21	21
8	(Australia) P S Low	24	21
(New Zealand) A Shastri	22	8
(New Zealand) N Tagle	21	21
(Northern Mariana Islands) L Manuel	2	1

Third round
4	(Australia) J Schueler	21	22
(Australia) J Lee	6	20
8	(Australia) P S Low	14	9
(New Zealand) N Tagle	21	21

Quarter-finals
4	(Australia) J Schueler	20	21	21
(New Zealand) N Tagle	22	15	10

=== Bottom half ===
==== Section 3 ====
First round
(Australia) G K Ong	21	21
(New Zealand) A Coumbe	7	5
(French Polynesia) R Rossi	21	21
(Australia) HY Wong	19	16
(Australia) K Xu	22	21
(Cook Islands) D Piakura	20	15
(New Zealand) W Wong	13	15
(Australia) R Tang	21	21
(Fiji) L Fong	18	15
(New Zealand) T Fang	21	21
(New Zealand) D Hillier	21	21
(French Polynesia) G Lefoll	11	16

Second round
(Australia) G K Ong	15	22
(French Polynesia) R Rossi	21	24
(Australia) K Xu	8	7
6	(New Zealand) R Cheng	21	21
(Australia) R Tang	21	21
(New Zealand) T Fang	13	11
(New Zealand) D Hillier	13	10
3	(Australia) A Dolman	21	21

Third round
(French Polynesia) R Rossi	21	21
6	(New Zealand) R Cheng	18	19
(Australia) R Tang	21	18	21
3	(Australia) A Dolman	10	21	12

Quarter-finals
(French Polynesia) R Rossi	14	21	21
(Australia) R Tang	21	16	18

==== Section 4 ====
First round
(Australia) R Agustino	13	11
(New Zealand) O Guo	21	21
(New Zealand) J Feng	21	21
(French Polynesia) K Teiefitu	9	10
(Northern Mariana Islands) I Lubao	17	18
(New Zealand) T Chen	21	21
(New Zealand) E van der Ley	21	21
(Tonga) T Ngaue	9	17
(Australia) K Richardson	21	21
(New Caledonia) J Lemaitre	15	7

Second round
(New Zealand) O Guo	21	21
(New Zealand) J Feng	11	7
(New Zealand) T Chen	1	9
7	(Australia) A Selladurai	21	21
(New Zealand) E van der Ley	8	10
(Australia) M L Ranasinghe	21	21
(Australia) K Richardson	21	16	12
2	(New Zealand) E Lau	18	21	21

Third round
(New Zealand) O Guo	21	21
7	(Australia) A Selladurai	18	19
(Australia) M L Ranasinghe	21	21	16
2	(New Zealand) E Lau	23	2	21

Quarter-finals
(New Zealand) O Guo	22	15
2	(New Zealand) E Lau	24	21

== Women's singles ==
=== Seeds ===
1. (Australia) Tiffany Ho (final)
2. (Australia) Louisa Ma (semi-finals)
3. (Australia) Bernice Teoh (semi-finals)
4. (Australia) Sydney Go (quarter-finals)

=== Finals ===
Semi-finals
1	(Australia) Tiffany Ho	21	21
3	(Australia) Bernice Teoh	11	11
(New Zealand) Shaunna Li	21	21
2	(Australia) Louisa Ma	18	15

Final
1	(Australia) Tiffany Ho	22	21	12
(New Zealand) Shaunna Li	24	18	21

=== Top half ===
==== Section 1 ====
First round
(Australia) Y Tse	21	13	17
(New Zealand) G Galvez	14	21	21

Second round
1	(Australia) T Ho	21	21
(New Zealand) C Alley	7	10
(French Polynesia) J Maho	7	5
(New Zealand) G Galvez	21	21

Quarter-finals
1	(Australia) T Ho	21	21
(New Zealand) G Galvez	12	16

==== Section 2 ====
First round
(Northern Mariana Islands) J Cardinio	5	4
(New Caledonia) D Matauli	21	21
(New Zealand) A Ung	w	/	o
(Australia) YR Zhang

Second round
3	(Australia) B Teoh	21	21
(New Caledonia) D Matauli	9	12
(Tonga) M L Kei	7	2^{r}
(New Zealand) A Ung	21	9

Quarter-finals
3	(Australia) B Teoh	21	21
(New Zealand) A Ung	10	16

=== Top half ===
==== Section 3 ====
First round
(New Zealand) S Li	21	21
(Australia) C Sam	17	10
(Australia) P Kustiadi	21	21
(New Zealand) A Virk	19	15

Second round
(New Zealand) S Li	21	21
(Australia) YL Zhang	17	8
(Australia) P Kustiadi	22	27	10
4	(Australia) S Go	24	25	21

Quarter-finals
(New Zealand) S Li	21	21
4	(Australia) S Go	13	16

==== Section 4 ====
First round
(Northern Mariana Islands) J Pangilnan	21	21
(Tonga) L 'Isitolo	14	15
(New Zealand) C Trillo	21	21
(New Caledonia) S Ho-Yagues	10	11

Second round
(Northern Mariana Islands) J Pangilnan	3	6
(New Zealand) J Zhu	21	21
(New Zealand) C Trillo
2	(Australia) L Ma	w/o

Quarter-finals
(New Zealand) J Zhu	20	10
2	(Australia) L Ma	22	21

== Men's doubles ==
=== Seeds ===
1. (New Zealand) Adam Jeffrey / Dylan Soedjasa (second round)
2. (New Zealand) Abhinav Manota / Jack Wang (second round)
3. (New Zealand) Jonathan Curtin / Ryan Tong (second round)
4. (Australia) Julian Lee / Milain Lohith Ranasinghe (quarter-finals)

=== Finals ===
Semi-finals
(Australia) Kenneth Choo (Australia) Rayne Wang	21	21
(Australia) Keith Mark Edison (Australia) Mitchell Wheller	15	14
(New Zealand) Alan Chan (New Zealand) Chance Cheng	21	21
(Australia) Lim Ming Chuen (Australia) Jack Yu	17	14

Final
(Australia) Kenneth Choo (Australia) Rayne Wang	17	21	21
(New Zealand) Alan Chan (New Zealand) Chance Cheng	21	15	18

=== Top half ===
==== Section 1 ====
First round
(Australia) G K Ong (Australia) K C Teoh	21	23
(Australia) A Dolman (French Polynesia) R Rossi	16	21
(New Zealand) P Tayalan (New Zealand) J Virk	12	9
(Australia) K Choo (Australia) R Wang	21	21
(French Polynesia) K Teiefitu (French Polynesia) H Yvonet	19	11
(New Zealand) D Hillier (New Zealand) A Rouse	21	21

Second round
1	(New Zealand) A Jeffrey (New Zealand) D Soedjasa	22	19
(Australia) G K Ong (Australia) K C Teoh	24	21
(Australia) K Choo (Australia) R Wang	21	21
(New Zealand) D Hillier (New Zealand) A Rouse	17	19

Quarter-finals
(Australia) G K Ong (Australia) K C Teoh	18	21	17
(Australia) K Choo (Australia) R Wang	21	18	21

==== Section 2 ====
First round
(Australia) D D Low (Australia) K Xu	13	19
(New Zealand) D Vong (New Zealand) E Wong	21	21
(Tonga) S Molitika (Tonga) T Ngaue	14	11
(Fiji) L Fong (French Polynesia) T Politi	21	21
(New Zealand) T Fang (New Zealand) YF Zhang	18	17
(Australia) K M Edison (Australia) M Wheller	21	21

Second round
3	(New Zealand) J Curtin (New Zealand) R Tong	16	14
(New Zealand) D Vong (New Zealand) E Wong	21	21
(Fiji) L Fong (French Polynesia) T Politi	7	4
(Australia) K M Edison (Australia) M Wheller	21	21

Quarter-finals
(New Zealand) D Vong (New Zealand) E Wong	17	19
(Australia) K M Edison (Australia) M Wheller	21	21

=== Bottom half ===
==== Section 3 ====
First round
(French Polynesia) R Goubin (French Polynesia) G Lefoll	17	8
(New Zealand) P Liu (New Zealand) W Wong	21	21
(Australia) J Schueler (Australia) N Tang	11	17
(New Zealand) A Chan (New Zealand) C Cheng	21	21
(Cook Islands) D Matakino (Cook Islands) D Piakura	5	12
(New Zealand) N Tagle (New Zealand) V Tao	21	21

Second round
(New Zealand) P Liu (New Zealand) W Wong	11	12
(New Zealand) A Chan (New Zealand) C Cheng	21	21
(New Zealand) N Tagle (New Zealand) V Tao	26	21	15
4	(Australia) J Lee (Australia) M L Ranasinghe	28	16	21

Quarter-finals
(New Zealand) A Chan (New Zealand) C Cheng	21	21
4	(Australia) J Lee (Australia) M L Ranasinghe	13	10

==== Section 4 ====
First round
(Australia) Lim M C (Australia) J Yu	21	21
(New Zealand) D Shephard (New Zealand) E Zhong	14	13
(New Zealand) B Cox (New Zealand) E van der Ley	21	21
(Northern Mariana Islands) I Lubao (Northern Mariana Islands) L Manuel	11	15
(Australia) HD Tang (Australia) R Tang	w	/	o
(New Caledonia) R Ho-Yagues (New Caledonia) J Lemaitre

Second round
(Australia) Lim M C (Australia) J Yu	21	21
(New Zealand) B Cox (New Zealand) E van der Ley	8	10
(Australia) HD Tang (Australia) R Tang	24	21	21
2	(New Zealand) A Manota (New Zealand) J Wang	26	14	16

Quarter-finals
(Australia) Lim M C (Australia) J Yu	21	21
(Australia) HD Tang (Australia) R Tang	13	15

== Women's doubles ==
=== Seeds ===
1. (New Zealand) Erena Calder-Hawkins / Anona Pak (second round)
2. (Australia) Tiffany Ho / Khoo Lee Yen (final)
3. (Australia) Kaitlyn Ea / Angela Yu (quarter-finals)
4. (Australia) Carina Sam / Priska Kustiadi (semi-finals)

=== Finals ===
Semi-finals
(Australia) Sylvina Kurniawan (Australia) Setyana Mapasa	21	21
(Australia) Joyce Choong (Australia) Gronya Somerville	19	11
4	(Australia) Priska Kustiadi (Australia) Carina Sam	9	14
2	(Australia) Tiffany Ho (Australia) Khoo Lee Yen	21	21

Final
(Australia) Sylvina Kurniawan (Australia) Setyana Mapasa	21	21
2	(Australia) Tiffany Ho (Australia) Khoo Lee Yen	7	9

=== Top half ===
==== Section 1 ====
First round

Second round
1	(New Zealand) E Calder-Hawkins (New Zealand) A Pak	14	13
(Australia) S Kurniawan (Australia) S Mapasa	21	21
(Australia) S Go (Australia) YL Zhang	21	21
(New Caledonia) S Ho-Yagues (New Caledonia) D Matauli	7	5

Quarter-finals
(Australia) S Kurniawan (Australia) S Mapasa	21	21
(Australia) S Go (Australia) YL Zhang	15	17

==== Section 2 ====
First round

Second round
3	(Australia) K Ea (Australia) A Yu	21	21
(New Zealand) C Alley (New Zealand) J Zhu	10	9
(New Zealand) A Leung (New Zealand) J Villegas	7	7
(Australia) J Choong (Australia) G Somerville	21	21

Quarter-finals
3	(Australia) K Ea (Australia) A Yu	18	22	18
(Australia) J Choong (Australia) G Somerville	21	20	21

=== Bottom half ===
==== Section 3 ====
First round
(Northern Mariana Islands) J Cardinio (Northern Mariana Islands) J Pangilnan	21	21
(Tonga) M L Kei (Tonga) L 'Isitolo	11	10

Second round
(Northern Mariana Islands) J Cardinio (Northern Mariana Islands) J Pangilnan	13	11
(Australia) Y Tse (Australia) J Wong	21	21
(French Polynesia) J Maho (Australia) B Teoh	10	5
4	(Australia) P Kustiadi (Australia) C Sam	21	21

Quarter-finals
(Australia) Y Tse (Australia) J Wong	21	23	18
4	(Australia) P Kustiadi (Australia) C Sam	18	25	21

==== Section 4 ====
First round

Second round
(New Zealand) S Fu (New Zealand) A Tagle	16	21	21
(Australia) M Almazan (Australia) JQ Li	21	17	13
(New Zealand) C Fan (New Zealand) G Galvez	10	6
2	(Australia) T Ho (Australia) Khoo L Y	21	21

Quarter-finals
(New Zealand) S Fu (New Zealand) A Tagle	13	15
2	(Australia) T Ho (Australia) Khoo L Y	21	21

== Mixed doubles ==
=== Seeds ===
1. (Australia) Kenneth Choo / Gronya Somerville (champions)
2. (New Zealand) Adam Jeffrey / Justine Villegas (first round)
3. (New Zealand) Jack Wang / Erena Calder-Hawkins (first round)
4. (New Zealand) Dylan Soedjasa / Anona Pak (first round)

=== Finals ===
Semi-finals
1	(Australia) Kenneth Choo (Australia) Gronya Somerville	21	21
(Australia) Gavin Kyjac Ong (Australia) Khoo Lee Yen	16	10
(Australia) Lim Ming Chuen (Australia) Sylvina Kurniawan	21	21
(Australia) Ricky Tang (Australia) Kaitlyn Ea	11	12

Final
1	(Australia) Kenneth Choo (Australia) Gronya Somerville	21	21
(Australia) Lim Ming Chuen (Australia) Sylvina Kurniawan	12	16

=== Top half ===
==== Section 1 ====
First round
(Northern Mariana Islands) L Manuel (Northern Mariana Islands) J Cardinio	9	7
(New Zealand) W Wong (New Zealand) J Zhu	21	21
(New Zealand) J Curtin (New Zealand) A Leung	21	14	22
(Australia) J Lee (Australia) P Kustiadi	17	21	24
(Australia) K Xu (Australia) C Sam	21	21
(French Polynesia) R Goubin (French Polynesia) J Maho	12	12

Second round
1	(Australia) K Choo (Australia) G Somerville	21	21
(New Zealand) W Wong (New Zealand) J Zhu	4	10
(Australia) J Lee (Australia) P Kustiadi	21	24	21
(Australia) K Xu (Australia) C Sam	11	26	16

Quarter-finals
1	(Australia) K Choo (Australia) G Somerville	21	21
(Australia) J Lee (Australia) P Kustiadi	13	18

==== Section 2 ====
First round
3	(New Zealand) J Wang (New Zealand) E Calder-Hawkins	21	18	19
(Australia) R Wang (Australia) A Yu	16	21	21
(New Caledonia) R Ho-Yagues (New Caledonia) D Matauli
(Australia) G K Ong (Australia) Khoo L Y	w/o
(Australia) K C Teoh (Australia) B Teoh	21	17	21
(New Zealand) V Tao (New Zealand) A Tagle	14	21	23
(New Zealand) P Liu (New Zealand) C Fan	21	21
(Tonga) S Molitika (Tonga) M L Kei	5	7

Second round
(Australia) R Wang (Australia) A Yu	15	12
(Australia) G K Ong (Australia) Khoo L Y	21	21
(New Zealand) V Tao (New Zealand) A Tagle	21	21
(New Zealand) P Liu (New Zealand) C Fan	11	12

Quarter-finals
(Australia) G K Ong (Australia) Khoo L Y	18	21	21
(New Zealand) V Tao (New Zealand) A Tagle	21	14	15

=== Bottom half ===
==== Section 3 ====
First round
(Northern Mariana Islands) N Guerrero (Northern Mariana Islands) J Pangilnan	13	16
(New Zealand) D Vong (New Zealand) R Apalisok	21	21
(New Zealand) E Lau (New Zealand) S Li	21	21
(Australia) R Agustino (Australia) JQ Li	16	8
(Tonga) T Ngaue (Tonga) L 'Isitolo	6	9
(Australia) H K Oon (Australia) J Choong	21	21
(Australia) Lim M C (Australia) S Kurniawan	21	14	21
4	(New Zealand) D Soedjasa (New Zealand) A Pak	17	21	9

Second round
(New Zealand) D Vong (New Zealand) R Apalisok	10	15
(New Zealand) E Lau (New Zealand) S Li	21	21
(Australia) H K Oon (Australia) J Choong	13	21
(Australia) Lim M C (Australia) S Kurniawan	21	23

Quarter-finals
(New Zealand) E Lau (New Zealand) S Li	15	20
(Australia) Lim M C (Australia) S Kurniawan	21	22

==== Section 4 ====
First round
(Australia) P S Low (Australia) YR Zhang
(New Zealand) YF Zhang (New Zealand) G Galvez	w/o
(Australia) M Wheller (Australia) L Ma	21	21
(Australia) D D Low (New Zealand) A Ung	14	13
(New Zealand) B Cox (New Zealand) C Alley	21	12	21
(New Caledonia) J Lemaitre (New Caledonia) S Ho-Yagues	12	21	17
(Australia) R Tang (Australia) K Ea	11	21	21
2	(New Zealand) A Jeffrey (New Zealand) J Villegas	21	15	13

Second round
(New Zealand) YF Zhang (New Zealand) G Galvez	16	20
(Australia) M Wheller (Australia) L Ma	21	22
(New Zealand) B Cox (New Zealand) C Alley	5	12
(Australia) R Tang (Australia) K Ea	21	21

Quarter-finals
(Australia) M Wheller (Australia) L Ma	19	21
(Australia) R Tang (Australia) K Ea	21	23

== Team event ==
=== Standings ===
Pos	Team	Pld	W	L	MF	MA	MD	GF	GA	GD	PF	PA	PD	Pts	
1	Australia	6	6	0	29	1	+28	58	2	+56	1308	583	+725	6	Gold medal
2	New Zealand (H)	6	5	1	24	6	+18	48	12	+36	1250	698	+552	5	Silver medal
3	New Caledonia	6	4	2	18	12	+6	37	25	+12	1046	935	+111	4	Bronze medal
4	Cook Islands	6	2	4	9	21	−12	23	44	−21	953	1267	−314	2	
5	Tahiti	6	2	4	12	18	−6	27	37	−10	1011	1126	−115	2	
6	Tonga	6	1	5	7	23	−16	16	49	−33	845	1303	−458	1	
7	Northern Mariana Islands	6	1	5	6	24	−18	13	53	−40	821	1322	−501	1	

Source: TS
(H) Host

==== Tahiti vs Cook Islands ====
Tahiti
2
Auckland Badminton Stadium, Court 1
17 February 2023, 10:00 UTC+13

Cook Islands
3

			1	2	3
1	(French Polynesia) (Cook Islands)	Remy Goubin / May Gaymann; Emanuela Mataio / Tereapii Akavi	19; 21	18; 21
2	(French Polynesia) (Cook Islands)	Taphira Barsinas; Te Pa Tupa	5; 21	9; 21
3	(French Polynesia) (Cook Islands)	Glen Lefoll; Daniel Akavi	21; 8	21; 13
4	(French Polynesia) (Cook Islands)	May Gaymann / Jenny Maho; Tereapii Akavi / Te Pa Tupa	18; 21	18; 21
5	(French Polynesia) (Cook Islands)	Kaihei Teiefitu / Heiva Yvonet; Damus Matakino / David Piakura	21; 12	21; 16

==== New Zealand vs Tonga ====
New Zealand
5
Auckland Badminton Stadium, Court 2
17 February 2023, 10:00 UTC+13

Tonga
0

			1	2	3
1	(New Zealand) (Tonga)	Adam Jeffrey / Justine Villegas; Lauti Na`Aniumotu / Mele Lingisiva Kei	21; 9	21; 7
2	(New Zealand) (Tonga)	Camellia Zhou; Lata `Isitolo	21; 5	21; 5
3	(New Zealand) (Tonga)	Abhinav Manota; Taniela Ngaue	21; 5	21; 3
4	(New Zealand) (Tonga)	Erena Calder-Hawkins / Anona Pak; Mele Lingisiva Kei / Lata `Isitolo	21; 5	21; 9
5	(New Zealand) (Tonga)	Dylan Soedjasa / Jack Wang; Lauti Na`Aniumotu / Taniela Ngaue	21; 10	21; 10

==== Australia vs Northern Mariana Islands ====
Australia
5
Auckland Badminton Stadium, Court 3
17 February 2023, 10:00 UTC+13

Northern Mariana Islands
0

			1	2	3
1	(Australia) (Northern Mariana Islands)	Jacob Schueler / Louisa Ma; Nathan Guerrero / Janelle Pangilnan	21; 12	21; 4
2	(Australia) (Northern Mariana Islands)	Nathan Tang; Ian Lubao	21; 2	21; 5
3	(Australia) (Northern Mariana Islands)	Louisa Ma; Jeanelyn Cardinio	21; 3	21; 3
4	(Australia) (Northern Mariana Islands)	Lim Ming Chuen / Jack Yu; Ian Lubao / Leonard Manuel	21; 3	21; 3
5	(Australia) (Northern Mariana Islands)	Kaitlyn Ea / Gronya Somerville; Jeanelyn Cardinio / Janelle Pangilnan	21; 5	21; 1

==== New Caledonia vs Northern Mariana Islands ====
New Caledonia
5
Auckland Badminton Stadium, Court 1
17 February 2023, 14:00 UTC+13

Northern Mariana Islands
0

			1	2	3
1	(New Caledonia) (Northern Mariana Islands)	Jeremy Lemaitre / Dgenyva Matauli; Nathan Guerrero / Janelle Pangilnan	21; 16	21; 13
2	(New Caledonia) (Northern Mariana Islands)	Lucas Juillot; Leonard Manuel	21; 13	21; 13
3	(New Caledonia) (Northern Mariana Islands)	Marine Souviat; Jeanelyn Cardinio	21; 9	21; 6
4	(New Caledonia) (Northern Mariana Islands)	Lucas Juillot / Jeremy Lemaitre; Ian Lubao / Leonard Manuel	21; 9	21; 9
5	(New Caledonia) (Northern Mariana Islands)	Soizick Ho-Yagues / Dgenyva Matauli; Jeanelyn Cardinio / Janelle Pangilnan	21; 14	21; 12

==== New Zealand vs Cook Islands ====
New Zealand
5
Auckland Badminton Stadium, Court 2
17 February 2023, 14:00 UTC+13

Cook Islands
0

			1	2	3
1	(New Zealand) (Cook Islands)	Dylan Soedjasa; Tahitoa Webb	21; 3	21; 3
2	(New Zealand) (Cook Islands)	Justine Villegas; Tehani Matapo	21; 6	21; 7
3	(New Zealand) (Cook Islands)	Adam Jeffrey / Abhinav Manota; Daniel Akavi / Damus Matakino	21; 5	21; 5
4	(New Zealand) (Cook Islands)	Erena Calder-Hawkins / Camellia Zhou; Tereapii Akavi / Te Pa Tupa	21; 14	21; 18
5	(New Zealand) (Cook Islands)	Jack Wang / Anona Pak; David Piakura / Tuaanaore Mitchell	21; 5	21; 3

==== Australia vs Tonga ====
Australia
5
Auckland Badminton Stadium, Court 3
17 February 2023, 14:00 UTC+13

Tonga
0

			1	2	3
1	(Australia) (Tonga)	Jacob Schueler; Taniela Ngaue	21; 6	21; 7
2	(Australia) (Tonga)	Louisa Ma; Lata `Isitolo	21; 5	21; 10
3	(Australia) (Tonga)	Nathan Tang / Jack Yu; Siale Molitika / Taniela Ngaue	21; 5	21; 8
4	(Australia) (Tonga)	Joyce Choong / Louisa Ma; Mele Lingisiva Kei / Lata `Isitolo	21; 3	21; 5
5	(Australia) (Tonga)	Jack Yu / Kaitlyn Ea; Lauti Na`Aniumotu / Mele Lingisiva Kei	21; 4	21; 7

==== Australia vs Cook Islands ====
Australia
5
Auckland Badminton Stadium, Court 1
17 February 2023, 18:00 UTC+13

Cook Islands
0

			1	2	3
1	(Australia) (Cook Islands)	Lim Ming Chuen / Kaitlyn Ea; Daniel Akavi / Tehani Matapo	21; 5	21; 4
2	(Australia) (Cook Islands)	Louisa Ma; Tuaanaore Mitchell	21; 6	21; 8
3	(Australia) (Cook Islands)	Jack Yu; David Piakura	21; 6	21; 4
4	(Australia) (Cook Islands)	Tiffany Ho / Gronya Somerville; Tehani Matapo / Tuaanaore Mitchell	21; 2	21; 7
5	(Australia) (Cook Islands)	Jacob Schueler / Nathan Tang; Emanuela Mataio / Tahitoa Webb	21; 9	21; 5

==== New Caledonia vs Tonga ====
New Caledonia
5
Auckland Badminton Stadium, Court 2
17 February 2023, 18:00 UTC+13

Tonga
0

			1	2	3
1	(New Caledonia) (Tonga)	Lucas Juillot / Soizick Ho-Yagues; Lauti Na`Aniumotu / Lata `Isitolo	21; 11	21; 12
2	(New Caledonia) (Tonga)	Dgenyva Matauli; Mele Lingisiva Kei	21; 6	21; 8
3	(New Caledonia) (Tonga)	Jeremy Lemaitre; Taniela Ngaue	21; 8	21; 7
4	(New Caledonia) (Tonga)	Soizick Ho-Yagues / Marine Souviat; Mele Lingisiva Kei / Lata `Isitolo	21; 11	21; 12
5	(New Caledonia) (Tonga)	Lucas Juillot / Jeremy Lemaitre; Lauti Na`Aniumotu / Taniela Ngaue	21; 14	21; 8

==== Tahiti vs Northern Mariana Islands ====
Tahiti
3
Auckland Badminton Stadium, Court 3
17 February 2023, 18:00 UTC+13

Northern Mariana Islands
2

			1	2	3
1	(French Polynesia) (Northern Mariana Islands)	Rémi Rossi / May Gaymann; Nathan Guerrero / Janelle Pangilnan	21; 11	21; 3
2	(French Polynesia) (Northern Mariana Islands)	Taphira Barsinas; Jeanelyn Cardinio	21; 15	17; 21	20; 22
3	(French Polynesia) (Northern Mariana Islands)	Kaihei Teiefitu; Leonard Manuel	21; 11	21; 9
4	(French Polynesia) (Northern Mariana Islands)	May Gaymann / Jenny Maho; Jeanelyn Cardinio / Janelle Pangilnan	12; 21	21; 16	13; 21
5	(French Polynesia) (Northern Mariana Islands)	Remy Goubin / Glen Lefoll; Ian Lubao / Leonard Manuel	21; 18	21; 5

==== Australia vs Tahiti ====
Australia
4
Auckland Badminton Stadium, Court 1
18 February 2023, 10:00 UTC+13

Tahiti
1

			1	2	3
1	(Australia) (French Polynesia)	Jack Yu / Kaitlyn Ea; Rémi Rossi / May Gaymann	21; 10	21; 13
2	(Australia) (French Polynesia)	Tiffany Ho; Taphira Barsinas	21; 4	21; 2
3	(Australia) (French Polynesia)	Kaitlyn Ea / Gronya Somerville; May Gaymann / Jenny Maho	21; 6	21; 10
4	(Australia) (French Polynesia)	Jacob Schueler; Rémi Rossi	19; 21	17; 21
5	(Australia) (French Polynesia)	Kenneth Choo / Lim Ming Chuen; Kaihei Teiefitu / Heiva Yvonet	21; 12	21; 16

==== New Caledonia vs Cook Islands ====
New Caledonia
5
Auckland Badminton Stadium, Court 2
18 February 2023, 10:00 UTC+13

Cook Islands
0

			1	2	3
1	(New Caledonia) (Cook Islands)	Lucas Juillot / Soizick Ho-Yagues; Emanuela Mataio / Tereapii Akavi	21; 19	21; 15
2	(New Caledonia) (Cook Islands)	Marine Souviat; Te Pa Tupa	21; 17	16; 21	21; 11
3	(New Caledonia) (Cook Islands)	Jeremy Lemaitre; Damus Matakino	21; 7	21; 9
4	(New Caledonia) (Cook Islands)	Soizick Ho-Yagues / Dgenyva Matauli; Tereapii Akavi / Te Pa Tupa	21; 8	21; 19
5	(New Caledonia) (Cook Islands)	Lucas Juillot / Jeremy Lemaitre; Daniel Akavi / Emanuela Mataio	21; 12	21; 9

==== New Zealand vs Northern Mariana Islands ====
New Zealand
5
Auckland Badminton Stadium, Court 3
18 February 2023, 10:00 UTC+13

Northern Mariana Islands
0

			1	2	3
1	(New Zealand) (Northern Mariana Islands)	Adam Jeffrey / Justine Villegas; Nathan Guerrero / Janelle Pangilnan	21; 9	21; 8
2	(New Zealand) (Northern Mariana Islands)	Shaunna Li; Jeanelyn Cardinio	21; 6	21; 10
3	(New Zealand) (Northern Mariana Islands)	Abhinav Manota; Leonard Manuel	21; 3	21; 5
4	(New Zealand) (Northern Mariana Islands)	Erena Calder-Hawkins / Anona Pak; Jeanelyn Cardinio / Janelle Pangilnan	21; 9	21; 4
5	(New Zealand) (Northern Mariana Islands)	Edward Lau / Dylan Soedjasa; Ian Lubao / Leonard Manuel	21; 7	21; 5

==== Tonga vs Northern Mariana Islands ====
Tonga
4
Auckland Badminton Stadium, Court 1
18 February 2023, 14:00 UTC+13

Northern Mariana Islands
1

			1	2	3
1	(Tonga) (Northern Mariana Islands)	Lauti Na`Aniumotu / Mele Lingisiva Kei; Nathan Guerrero / Janelle Pangilnan	10; 21	12; 21
2	(Tonga) (Northern Mariana Islands)	Taniela Ngaue; Ian Lubao	21; 12	21; 15
3	(Tonga) (Northern Mariana Islands)	Lata `Isitolo; Jeanelyn Cardinio	21; 15	21; 14
4	(Tonga) (Northern Mariana Islands)	Lauti Na`Aniumotu / Taniela Ngaue; Ian Lubao / Leonard Manuel	21; 19	21; 18
5	(Tonga) (Northern Mariana Islands)	Mele Lingisiva Kei / Lata `Isitolo; Jeanelyn Cardinio / Janelle Pangilnan	19; 21	21; 15	22; 20

==== New Zealand vs Tahiti ====
New Zealand
4
Auckland Badminton Stadium, Court 2
18 February 2023, 14:00 UTC+13

Tahiti
1

			1	2	3
1	(New Zealand) (French Polynesia)	Adam Jeffrey / Shaunna Li; Heiva Yvonet / May Gaymann	21; 11	21; 13
2	(New Zealand) (French Polynesia)	Dylan Soedjasa; Rémi Rossi	18; 21	11; 21
3	(New Zealand) (French Polynesia)	Justine Villegas; Taphira Barsinas	21; 9	21; 8
4	(New Zealand) (French Polynesia)	Abhinav Manota / Jack Wang; Remy Goubin / Glen Lefoll	21; 8	21; 15
5	(New Zealand) (French Polynesia)	Erena Calder-Hawkins / Anona Pak; May Gaymann / Jenny Maho	21; 8	21; 10

==== Australia vs New Caledonia ====
Australia
5
Auckland Badminton Stadium, Court 3
18 February 2023, 14:00 UTC+13

New Caledonia
0

			1	2	3
1	(Australia) (New Caledonia)	Nathan Tang; Jeremy Lemaitre	21; 9	21; 9
2	(Australia) (New Caledonia)	Tiffany Ho; Dgenyva Matauli	21; 7	21; 13
3	(Australia) (New Caledonia)	Lim Ming Chuen / Jack Yu; Lucas Juillot / Jeremy Lemaitre	21; 8	21; 12
4	(Australia) (New Caledonia)	Joyce Choong / Gronya Somerville; Soizick Ho-Yagues / Dgenyva Matauli	21; 12	21; 6
5	(Australia) (New Caledonia)	Jacob Schueler / Louisa Ma; Lucas Juillot / Marine Souviat	21; 9	21; 13

==== Cook Islands vs Northern Mariana Islands ====
Cook Islands
2
Auckland Badminton Stadium, Court 1
18 February 2023, 18:00 UTC+13

Northern Mariana Islands
3

			1	2	3
1	(Cook Islands) (Northern Mariana Islands)	Daniel Akavi / Tehani Matapo; Nathan Guerrero / Janelle Pangilnan	21; 17	13; 21	22; 24
2	(Cook Islands) (Northern Mariana Islands)	Emanuela Mataio; Ian Lubao	21; 13	21; 9
3	(Cook Islands) (Northern Mariana Islands)	Tereapii Akavi; Jeanelyn Cardinio	21; 11	21; 19
4	(Cook Islands) (Northern Mariana Islands)	David Piakura / Tahitoa Webb; Ian Lubao / Leonard Manuel	17; 21	21; 17	20; 22
5	(Cook Islands) (Northern Mariana Islands)	Tuaanaore Mitchell / Te Pa Tupa; Jeanelyn Cardinio / Janelle Pangilnan	22; 20	18; 21	14; 21

==== Tahiti vs Tonga ====
Tahiti
3
Auckland Badminton Stadium, Court 2
18 February 2023, 18:00 UTC+13

Tonga
2

			1	2	3
1	(French Polynesia) (Tonga)	Glen Lefoll / May Gaymann; Lauti Na`Aniumotu / Mele Lingisiva Kei	21; 15	21; 19
2	(French Polynesia) (Tonga)	Remy Goubin; Taniela Ngaue	23; 21	21; 16
3	(French Polynesia) (Tonga)	Taphira Barsinas; Lata `Isitolo	17; 21	18; 21
4	(French Polynesia) (Tonga)	Glen Lefoll / Kaihei Teiefitu; Siale Molitika / Taniela Ngaue	21; 14	21; 6
5	(French Polynesia) (Tonga)	May Gaymann / Jenny Maho; Mele Lingisiva Kei / Lata `Isitolo	21; 21	19; 16	15; 21

==== New Zealand vs New Caledonia ====
New Zealand
5
Auckland Badminton Stadium, Court 3
18 February 2023, 18:00 UTC+13

New Caledonia
0

			1	2	3
1	(New Zealand) (New Caledonia)	Abhinav Manota / Anona Pak; Lucas Juillot / Dgenyva Matauli	21; 3	21; 7
2	(New Zealand) (New Caledonia)	Edward Lau; Jeremy Lemaitre	21; 16	21; 15
3	(New Zealand) (New Caledonia)	Justine Villegas; Marine Souviat	21; 19	21; 14
4	(New Zealand) (New Caledonia)	Adam Jeffrey / Jack Wang; Lucas Juillot / Jeremy Lemaitre	21; 9	21; 11
5	(New Zealand) (New Caledonia)	Erena Calder-Hawkins / Camellia Zhou; Dgenyva Matauli / Marine Souviat	21; 11	21; 12

==== Australia vs New Zealand ====
Australia
5
Auckland Badminton Stadium, Court 1
19 February 2023, 10:00 UTC+13

New Zealand
0

			1	2	3
1	(Australia) (New Zealand)	Kenneth Choo / Gronya Somerville; Edward Lau / Anona Pak	18; 21	21; 14	21; 14
2	(Australia) (New Zealand)	Jack Yu; Abhinav Manota	21; 15	21; 18
3	(Australia) (New Zealand)	Tiffany Ho; Shaunna Li	11; 21	21; 9	21; 10
4	(Australia) (New Zealand)	Kaitlyn Ea / Gronya Somerville; Erena Calder-Hawkins / Anona Pak	21; 17	19; 21	21; 12
5	(Australia) (New Zealand)	Kenneth Choo / Lim Ming Chuen; Abhinav Manota / Jack Wang	27; 25	21; 16

==== Tahiti vs New Caledonia ====
Tahiti
2
Auckland Badminton Stadium, Court 2
19 February 2023, 10:00 UTC+13

New Caledonia
3

			1	2	3
1	(French Polynesia) (New Caledonia)	Rémi Rossi / May Gaymann; Jeremy Lemaitre / Soizick Ho-Yagues	15; 21	21; 14	21; 8
2	(French Polynesia) (New Caledonia)	Taphira Barsinas; Marine Souviat	2; 21	5; 21
3	(French Polynesia) (New Caledonia)	Rémi Rossi; Lucas Juillot	21; 7	21; 9
4	(French Polynesia) (New Caledonia)	May Gaymann / Jenny Maho; Dgenyva Matauli / Marine Souviat	13; 21	11; 21
5	(French Polynesia) (New Caledonia)	Glen Lefoll / Kaihei Teiefitu; Lucas Juillot / Jeremy Lemaitre	15; 21	12; 21

==== Cook Islands vs Tonga ====
Cook Islands
4
Auckland Badminton Stadium, Court 3
19 February 2023, 10:00 UTC+13

Tonga
1

			1	2	3
1	(Cook Islands) (Tonga)	Emanuela Mataio / Tereapii Akavi; Lauti Na`Aniumotu / Mele Lingisiva Kei	15; 21	21; 15	21; 16
2	(Cook Islands) (Tonga)	Te Pa O Te Rangi Tupa; Lata `Isitolo	21; 14	21; 8
3	(Cook Islands) (Tonga)	Emanuela Mataio; Taniela Ngaue	21; 13	19; 21	19; 21
4	(Cook Islands) (Tonga)	Tereapii Akavi / Te Pa O Te Rangi Tupa; Mele Lingisiva Kei / Lata `Isitolo	26; 24	21; 13
5	(Cook Islands) (Tonga)	Daniel Akavi / Damus Matakino; Lauti Na`Aniumotu / Taniela Ngaue	21; 13	17; 21	21; 18
