= Cook Islands national badminton team =

National badminton team representing the Cook Islands

Cook Islands
- Association: Cook Islands Badminton Association Inc. (CIBA)
- Confederation: BO (Oceania)
- President: Thomas Mereana-Ngauru

BWF ranking
- Current ranking: 78 ▼1 (2 January 2024)
- Highest ranking: 76 (4 July 2023)

Oceania Mixed Team Championships
- Appearances: 2 (first in 2023)
- Best result: Fourth place (2023)

The Cook Islands national badminton team (Cook Islands Māori: Te kapa badminton srot a motu o nga Kūki ʻĀirani) represents the Cook Islands, a self-governing island country in the South Pacific Ocean in free association with New Zealand, in international badminton team competitions. The Cook Islands team will debut in the 2023 Oceania Badminton Championships mixed team event.

== Competitive record ==
=== Thomas Cup ===
Year	Round	Pos
1949	Did not enter	
1952	Did not enter	
1955	Did not enter	
1958	Did not enter	
1961	Did not enter	
1964	Did not enter	
1967	Did not enter	
1970	Did not enter	
1973	Did not enter	
1976	Did not enter	
1979	Did not enter	
1982	Did not enter	
1984	Did not enter	
1986	Did not enter	
1988	Did not enter	
1990	Did not enter	
1992	Did not enter	
1994	Did not enter	
1996	Did not enter	
1998	Did not enter	
2000	Did not enter	
2002	Did not enter	
2004	Did not enter	
2006	Did not enter	
2008	Did not enter	
2010	Did not enter	
2012	Did not enter	
2014	Did not enter	
2016	Did not enter	
2018	Did not enter	
2020	Did not enter	
2022	Did not enter	
2024	Did not qualify	
2026	Did not qualify	
2028	TBD	
2030	TBD	

=== Uber Cup ===
Year	Round	Pos
1957	Did not enter	
1960	Did not enter	
1963	Did not enter	
1966	Did not enter	
1969	Did not enter	
1972	Did not enter	
1975	Did not enter	
1978	Did not enter	
1981	Did not enter	
1984	Did not enter	
1986	Did not enter	
1988	Did not enter	
1990	Did not enter	
1992	Did not enter	
1994	Did not enter	
1996	Did not enter	
1998	Did not enter	
2000	Did not enter	
2002	Did not enter	
2004	Did not enter	
2006	Did not enter	
2008	Did not enter	
2010	Did not enter	
2012	Did not enter	
2014	Did not enter	
2016	Did not enter	
2018	Did not enter	
2020	Did not enter	
2022	Did not enter	
2024	Did not qualify	
2026	Did not qualify	
2028	TBD	
2030	TBD	

=== Sudirman Cup ===
Year	Round	Pos
1989	Did not enter	
1991	Did not enter	
1993	Did not enter	
1995	Did not enter	
1997	Did not enter	
1999	Did not enter	
2001	Did not enter	
2003	Did not enter	
2005	Did not enter	
2007	Did not enter	
2009	Did not enter	
2011	Did not enter	
2013	Did not enter	
2015	Did not enter	
2017	Did not enter	
2019	Did not enter	
2021	Did not enter	
2023	Did not qualify	
2025	Did not qualify	
2027	TBD	
2029	TBD	

=== Oceania Team Championships ===
==== Men's team ====
Year	Round	Pos
2004	Did not enter	
2006	Did not enter	
2008	Did not enter	
2010	Did not enter	
2012	Did not enter	
2016	Did not enter	
2018	Did not enter	
2020	Did not enter	
2024	Fourth place	4th
2026	Fifth place	5th
2028	TBD	
2030	TBD	

==== Women's team ====
Year	Round	Pos
2004	Did not enter	
2006	Did not enter	
2008	Did not enter	
2010	Did not enter	
2012	Did not enter	
2016	Did not enter	
2018	Did not enter	
2020	Did not enter	
2024	Fourth place	4th
2026	Fifth place	5th
2028	TBD	
2030	TBD	

==== Mixed team ====
Year	Round	Pos
1999	Did not enter	
2002	Did not enter	
2004	Did not enter	
2006	Did not enter	
2008	Did not enter	
2010	Did not enter	
2012	Did not enter	
2014	Did not enter	
2016	Did not enter	
2019	Did not enter	
2023	Fourth place	4th
2025	Fifth place	5th
2027	TBD	
2029	TBD	

=== Pacific Games ===
==== Mixed team ====
Year	Round	Pos
2003	Did not enter	
2007	Did not enter	
2011	Did not enter	
2019	Did not enter	
2027	TBD	

=== Pacific Mini Games ===
==== Mixed team ====
Year	Round	Pos
2022	Did not enter	

**Red border color indicates tournament was held on home soil.

== Junior competitive record ==
=== Suhandinata Cup ===
Year	Round	Pos
2000	Did not enter	
2002	Did not enter	
2004	Did not enter	
2006	Did not enter	
2007	Did not enter	
2008	Did not enter	
2009	Did not enter	
2010	Did not enter	
2011	Did not enter	
2012	Did not enter	
2013	Did not enter	
2014	Did not enter	
2015	Did not enter	
2016	Did not enter	
2017	Did not enter	
2018	Did not enter	
2019	Did not enter	
2022	Did not enter	
2023	Group stage	32nd
2024	Group stage	32nd
2025	Withdrew	

=== Commonwealth Youth Games ===
==== Mixed team ====
Year	Round	Pos
2004	Did not enter	

=== Oceania Junior Team Championships ===
==== Mixed team ====
Year	Round	Pos
2011	Did not enter	
2013	Did not enter	
2015	Did not enter	
2017	Did not enter	
2019	Group stage	6th
2023	Group stage	5th
2025	Group stage	5th

**Red border color indicates tournament was held on home soil.

== Players ==
=== Current squad ===
As of 2 January 2024

==== Men's team ====
Name	DoB/Age	Ranking of event		
Name	DoB/Age	MS	MD	XD
Daniel Akavi	15 February 2006 (age 20)	-	-	-
Emanuela Mataio	31 October 2006 (age 20)	1828	-	-
Damus Matakino	8 July 2003 (age 23)	1054	711	-
David Piakura	29 August 1995 (age 31)	1054	711	-
Tahitoa Webb	25 April 2008 (age 18)	-	-	-

==== Women's team ====
Name	DoB/Age	Ranking of event		
Name	DoB/Age	WS	WD	XD
Tereapii Akavi	5 January 2005 (age 21)	1243	-	-
Tehani Matapo	4 April 2007 (age 19)	-	-	-
Tuaanaore Mitchell	5 September 2007 (age 19)	-	-	-
Te Pa O Te Rangi Tupa	11 August 2008 (age 18)	1243	-	-
Loureina Kureta	14 January 2007 (age 19)	-	-	-
