= Tahiti national badminton team =

National badminton team representing French Polynesia

Tahiti
- Association: Tahitian Badminton Federation (TFB)
- Confederation: BO (Oceania)
- President: Michael Alezrah

BWF ranking
- Current ranking: 76 (2 January 2024)
- Highest ranking: 40 (5 April 2018)

Sudirman Cup
- Appearances: 2 (first in 2017)
- Best result: Group stage

Thomas Cup
- Appearances: 1 (first in 2020)
- Best result: Group stage

Uber Cup
- Appearances: 1 (first in 2020)
- Best result: Group stage

Oceania Mixed Team Championships
- Appearances: 5 (first in 2014)
- Best result: Third place (2016, 2025)

Oceania Men's Team Championships
- Appearances: 4 (first in 2012)
- Best result: Third place (2016, 2018, 2020)

Oceania Women's Team Championships
- Appearances: 3 (first in 2016)
- Best result: Fourth place (2016, 2018, 2020)

The Tahiti national badminton team (French: Équipe nationale de badminton de Tahiti; Tahitian: Te pupu ma'iti badminton no te fenua Tahiti) represents French Polynesia, an overseas collectivity of France, in international badminton team competitions. The Tahitian team has competed in the Oceania Badminton Championships since 2014. The men's team achieved third place three times in the team tournament while the mixed team won bronze in the 2014 Oceania Badminton Championships.

In 2021, the Tahitian men's and women's team would make their debuts onto the Thomas Cup and Uber Cup when they qualified for the 2020 Thomas & Uber Cup finals after the withdrawal of the Australian team and New Zealand declining the invitation. The team were also invited to compete in the 2021 Sudirman Cup. The team was eliminated in the group stages.

Tahiti also competes in the Pacific Mini Games. The Tahitian team became the first nation to win the first ever badminton gold in the Pacific Mini Games.

== Competitive record ==
=== Thomas Cup ===
Year	Result
(England) 1949	Not a member of the BWF
(Colony of Singapore) 1952	Not a member of the BWF
(Colony of Singapore) 1955	Not a member of the BWF
(Colony of Singapore) 1958	Not a member of the BWF
(Indonesia) 1961	Not a member of the BWF
(Japan) 1964	Not a member of the BWF
(Indonesia) 1967	Not a member of the BWF
(Malaysia) 1970	Not a member of the BWF
(Indonesia) 1973	Not a member of the BWF
(Thailand) 1976	Not a member of the BWF
(Indonesia) 1979	Not a member of the BWF
(England) 1982	Not a member of the BWF
(Malaysia) 1984	Not a member of the BWF
(Indonesia) 1986	Not a member of the BWF
(Malaysia) 1988	Not a member of the BWF
(Japan) 1990	Not a member of the BWF
(Malaysia) 1992	Not a member of the BWF
(Indonesia) 1994	Not a member of the BWF
(Hong Kong) 1996	Not a member of the BWF
(Hong Kong) 1998	Not a member of the BWF
(Malaysia) 2000	Not a member of the BWF
(China) 2002	Not a member of the BWF
(Indonesia) 2004	Not a member of the BWF
(Japan) 2006	Not a member of the BWF
(Indonesia) 2008	Not a member of the BWF
(Malaysia) 2010	Did not enter
(China) 2012	Did not qualify
(India) 2014	Did not qualify
(China) 2016	Did not qualify
(Thailand) 2018	Did not qualify
(Denmark) 2020	Group C − 14th
(Thailand) 2022	Did not qualify
(China) 2024	Did not qualify
(Denmark) 2026	Did not qualify
(N/A) 2028	TBD
(N/A) 2030	TBD

=== Uber Cup ===
Year	Result
(England) 1957	Not a member of the BWF
(United States) 1960	Not a member of the BWF
(United States) 1963	Not a member of the BWF
(New Zealand) 1966	Not a member of the BWF
(Japan) 1969	Not a member of the BWF
(Japan) 1972	Not a member of the BWF
(Indonesia) 1975	Not a member of the BWF
(New Zealand) 1978	Not a member of the BWF
(Japan) 1981	Not a member of the BWF
(Malaysia) 1984	Not a member of the BWF
(Indonesia) 1986	Not a member of the BWF
(Malaysia) 1988	Not a member of the BWF
(Japan) 1990	Not a member of the BWF
(Malaysia) 1992	Not a member of the BWF
(Indonesia) 1994	Not a member of the BWF
(Hong Kong) 1996	Not a member of the BWF
(Hong Kong) 1998	Not a member of the BWF
(Malaysia) 2000	Not a member of the BWF
(China) 2002	Not a member of the BWF
(Indonesia) 2004	Not a member of the BWF
(Japan) 2006	Not a member of the BWF
(Indonesia) 2008	Not a member of the BWF
(Malaysia) 2010	Did not enter
(China) 2012	Did not enter
(India) 2014	Did not qualify
(China) 2016	Did not qualify
(Thailand) 2018	Did not qualify
(Denmark) 2020	Group C − 16th
(Thailand) 2022	Did not qualify
(China) 2024	Did not qualify
(Denmark) 2026	Did not qualify
(N/A) 2028	TBD
(N/A) 2030	TBD

=== Sudirman Cup ===
Year	Result
(Indonesia) 1989	Not a member of the BWF
(Denmark) 1991	Not a member of the BWF
(England) 1993	Not a member of the BWF
(Switzerland) 1995	Not a member of the BWF
(Scotland) 1997	Not a member of the BWF
(Denmark) 1999	Not a member of the BWF
(Spain) 2001	Not a member of the BWF
(Netherlands) 2003	Not a member of the BWF
(China) 2005	Not a member of the BWF
(Scotland) 2007	Not a member of the BWF
(China) 2009	Did not enter
(China) 2011	Did not enter
(Malaysia) 2013	Did not enter
(China) 2015	Did not enter
(Australia) 2017	Group 3 − 27th
(China) 2019	Did not enter
(Finland) 2021	Group B − 16th
(China) 2023	Did not qualify
(China) 2025	Did not qualify
(N/A) 2027	TBD
(N/A) 2029	TBD

=== Oceania Team Championships ===
==== Men's team ====
Year	Result
(Australia) 2004	Not a member of BO
(New Zealand) 2006	Not a member of BO
(New Caledonia) 2008	Not a member of BO
(New Zealand) 2010	Did not participate
(Australia) 2012	Fourth place
(New Zealand) 2016	(bronze) Third place
(New Zealand) 2018	(bronze) Third place
(Australia) 2020	(bronze) Third place
(Australia) 2024	(bronze) Third place
(New Zealand) 2026	(bronze) Third place

==== Women's team ====
Year	Result
(Australia) 2004	Not a member of BO
(New Zealand) 2006	Not a member of BO
(New Caledonia) 2008	Not a member of BO
(New Zealand) 2010	Did not participate
(Australia) 2012	Did not participate
(New Zealand) 2016	Fourth place
(New Zealand) 2018	Fourth place
(Australia) 2020	Fourth place
(Australia) 2024	(bronze) Third place
(New Zealand) 2026	(bronze) Third place

==== Mixed team ====
Year	Result
(Australia) 1999	Not a member of BO
(Fiji) 2002	Not a member of BO
(New Zealand) 2004	Not a member of BO
(New Zealand) 2006	Not a member of BO
(New Caledonia) 2008	Not a member of BO
(New Zealand) 2010	Did not participate
(Australia) 2012	Did not participate
(Australia) 2014	Fourth place
(New Zealand) 2016	(bronze) Third place
(Australia) 2019	Fourth place
(New Zealand) 2023	5th place
(New Zealand) 2025	(bronze) Third place

=== Pacific Games ===
==== Mixed team ====
Year	Result
(Fiji) 2003	Not a member of BO
(Samoa) 2007	Not a member of BO
(New Caledonia) 2011	(bronze) Third place
(Samoa) 2019	(bronze) Third place
(French Polynesia) 2027	TBD

=== Pacific Mini Games ===
==== Mixed team ====
Year	Result
(Northern Mariana Islands) 2022	(gold) Champions

**Red border color indicates tournament was held on home soil.

== Junior competitive record ==
=== Suhandinata Cup ===
Year	Result
(China) 2000	Did not enter
(South Africa) 2002	Did not enter
(Canada) 2004	Did not enter
(South Korea) 2006	Did not enter
(New Zealand) 2007	Did not enter
(India) 2008	Did not enter
(Malaysia) 2009	Did not enter
(Mexico) 2010	Did not enter
(Chinese Taipei) 2011	Did not enter
(Japan) 2012	Did not enter
(Thailand) 2013	Did not enter
(Malaysia) 2014	Did not enter
(Peru) 2015	Did not enter
(Spain) 2016	Did not enter
(Indonesia) 2017	Did not enter
(Canada) 2018	Did not enter
(Russia) 2019	Did not enter
(Spain) 2022	Group E − 35th of 37
(United States) 2023	Group G
(China) 2024	withdrew

=== Oceania Junior Team Championships ===
==== Mixed team ====
Year	Result
(Fiji) 2011	Round robin − 5th
(French Polynesia) 2013	(bronze) Third place
(New Zealand) 2015	Fourth place
(New Caledonia) 2017	(bronze) Third place
(Australia) 2019	(bronze) Third place
(New Zealand) 2023	Fourth place
(Northern Mariana Islands) 2025	Fourth place

**Red border color indicates tournament was held on home soil.

== Players ==
=== Current squad ===
As of 2 January 2024

==== Men's team ====
Name	DoB/Age	Ranking of event		
Name	DoB/Age	MS	MD	XD
Rémi Rossi	23 December 1995 (age 30)	379	717	-
Teiva Politi	5 November 2001 (age 24)	1028	1110	1160
Rémy Goubin	19 July 1996 (age 29)	1047	578	740
Glen Lefoll	28 December 1991 (age 34)	1047	578	-
Antoine Beaubois	29 August 1997 (age 28)	1551	1110	-
Elias Maublanc	5 September 2007 (age 18)	-	-	-
Heiva Yvonet	6 June 2004 (age 21)	1057	711	-
Kaihei Teiefitu	17 November 2004 (age 21)	1047	711	-

==== Women's team ====
Name	DoB/Age	Ranking of event		
Name	DoB/Age	WS	WD	XD
Jenny Maho	25 October 1997 (age 28)	586	589	740
Taphira Barsinas	4 March 2007 (age 18)	-	-	-
May Gaymann	20 November 1993 (age 32)	-	-	-
Maeva Gaillard	4 April 2007 (age 18)	1183	-	1160
Heirautea Curet	11 March 2005 (age 20)	-	-	-
Mélissa Mi You	25 December 2003 (age 22)	-	-	-
Chloé Segrestan	22 February 2002 (age 23)	-	-	-
Jenica Lesourd	28 April 2006 (age 19)	-	-	-

=== Previous squads ===
==== Thomas Cup ====
- 2020

==== Uber Cup ====
- 2020

==== Sudirman Cup ====
- 2021
