= 2006 Uber Cup group stage =

Badminton team tournament in Jakarta

The 2006 Uber Cup group stage was held at Sendai Gymnasium in Sendai, Japan, from 28 to 30 April 2006.

The group stage was the first phase of the tournament. The winner of each group advanced to the quarter-finals, while the remaining teams moved into the round of 16 in the knockout stages.

== Draw ==
The original draw for the tournament was conducted on 26 February 2006. Twelve teams were drawn into four groups, each containing three teams.

=== Group composition ===
Group
Group W	Group X	Group Y	Group Z
China; Chinese Taipei; United States	England; Hong Kong; Netherlands	Germany; South Korea; Singapore	Japan (Host); New Zealand; South Africa

== Group W ==
Pos	Team	Pld	W	L	MF	MA	MD	GF	GA	GD	PF	PA	PD	Pts	Qualification
1	China	2	2	0	10	0	+10	20	1	+19	444	193	+251	2	Quarter-finals
2	Chinese Taipei	2	1	1	5	5	0	11	10	+1	347	337	+10	1	Round of 16
3	United States	2	0	2	0	10	−10	0	20	−20	159	420	−261	0	Round of 16

Source: BadmintonCN

=== China vs United States ===
China
5
Sendai Gymnasium, Court 1
28 April 2006, 14:00 UTC+9

United States
0

			1	2	3
1	(China) (United States)	Zhang Ning; Eva Lee	21; 5	21; 10
2	(China) (United States)	Xie Xingfang; Jamie Subandhi	21; 9	21; 5
3	(China) (United States)	Lu Lan; Rulan Yeh	21; 6	21; 4
4	(China) (United States)	Gao Ling / Huang Sui; Eva Lee / Mesinee Mangkalakiri	21; 3	21; 7
5	(China) (United States)	Du Jing / Yu Yang; Jennifer Coleman / Lauren Todt	21; 3	21; 4

=== Chinese Taipei vs United States ===
Chinese Taipei
5
Sendai Gymnasium, Court 1
29 April 2006, 14:00 UTC+9

United States
0

			1	2	3
1	(Chinese Taipei) (United States)	Cheng Shao-chieh; Lili Zhou	21; 11	21; 16
2	(Chinese Taipei) (United States)	Huang Chia-hsin; Eva Lee	21; 9	21; 10
3	(Chinese Taipei) (United States)	Pai Min-jie; Jamie Subandhi	21; 11	21; 8
4	(Chinese Taipei) (United States)	Cheng Wen-hsing / Chien Yu-chin; Eva Lee / Mesinee Mangkalakiri	21; 12	21; 9
5	(Chinese Taipei) (United States)	Chou Chia-chi / Ku Pei-ting; Rulan Yeh / Rulien Yeh	21; 14	21; 3

=== China vs Chinese Taipei ===
China
5
Sendai Gymnasium, Court 1
30 April 2006, 17:00 UTC+9

Chinese Taipei
0

			1	2	3
1	(China) (Chinese Taipei)	Jiang Yanjiao; Cheng Shao-chieh	21; 12	21; 7
2	(China) (Chinese Taipei)	Gao Ling / Huang Sui; Cheng Wen-hsing / Chien Yu-chin	24; 26	21; 16	21; 15
3	(China) (Chinese Taipei)	Zhang Ning; Huang Chia-hsin	21; 4	21; 17
4	(China) (Chinese Taipei)	Yang Wei / Zhang Jiewen; Chou Chia-chi / Ku Pei-ting	21; 12	21; 12
5	(China) (Chinese Taipei)	Xie Xingfang; Pai Min-jie	21; 7	21; 9

== Group X ==
Pos	Team	Pld	W	L	MF	MA	MD	GF	GA	GD	PF	PA	PD	Pts	Qualification
1	Hong Kong	2	2	0	6	4	+2	13	7	+6	377	329	+48	2	Quarter-finals
2	Netherlands	2	1	1	7	3	+4	15	9	+6	454	412	+42	1	Round of 16
3	England	2	0	2	2	8	−6	4	16	−12	306	396	−90	0	Round of 16

Source: BadmintonCN

=== Netherlands vs Hong Kong ===
Netherlands
2
Sendai Gymnasium, Court 1
28 April 2006, 17:00 UTC+9

Hong Kong
3

			1	2	3
1	(Netherlands) (Hong Kong)	Judith Meulendijks; Wang Chen	15; 21	5; 21
2	(Netherlands) (Hong Kong)	Rachel van Cutsen; Yip Pui Yin	22; 20	16; 21	17; 21
3	(Netherlands) (Hong Kong)	Karina de Wit; Olivia Wong Sin Yee	21; 12	21; 15
4	(Netherlands) (Hong Kong)	Rachel van Cutsen / Paulien van Dooremalen; Chau Hoi Wah / Koon Wai Chee	18; 21	13; 21
5	(Netherlands) (Hong Kong)	Karina de Wit / Judith Meulendijks; Wang Chen / Yip Pui Yin	21; 16	17; 21	21; 18

=== England vs Hong Kong ===
England
2
Sendai Gymnasium, Court 1
29 April 2006, 17:00 UTC+9

Hong Kong
3

			1	2	3
1	(England) (Hong Kong)	Julia Mann; Wang Chen	7; 21	8; 21
2	(England) (Hong Kong)	Jill Pittard; Yip Pui Yin	15; 21	20; 21
3	(England) (Hong Kong)	Elizabeth Cann; Olivia Wong Sin Yee	19; 21	18; 21
4	(England) (Hong Kong)	Suzanne Rayappan / Jenny Wallwork; Wang Chen / Yip Pui Yin				w/o
5	(England) (Hong Kong)	Natalie Munt / Joanne Nicholas; Chau Hoi Wah / Koon Wai Chee	21; 13	21; 10

=== Netherlands vs England ===
Netherlands
5
Sendai Gymnasium, Court 1
30 April 2006, 14:00 UTC+9

England
0

			1	2	3
1	(Netherlands) (England)	Mia Audina; Julia Mann	21; 8	21; 9
2	(Netherlands) (England)	Judith Meulendijks; Jill Pittard	11; 12	11; 10
3	(Netherlands) (England)	Karina de Wit; Elizabeth Cann	21; 17	11; 21	21; 13
4	(Netherlands) (England)	Judith Meulendijks / Rachel van Cutsen; Suzanne Rayappan / Jenny Wallwork	21; 14	19; 21	28; 26
5	(Netherlands) (England)	Mia Audina / Karina de Wit; Natalie Munt / Joanne Nicholas	21; 16	21; 17

== Group Y ==
Pos	Team	Pld	W	L	MF	MA	MD	GF	GA	GD	PF	PA	PD	Pts	Qualification
1	South Korea	2	2	0	8	2	+6	16	4	+12	425	317	+108	2	Quarter-finals
2	Germany	2	1	1	4	6	−2	7	12	−5	357	383	−26	1	Round of 16
3	Singapore	2	0	2	3	7	−4	7	14	−7	325	407	−82	0	Round of 16

Source: BadmintonCN

=== South Korea vs Singapore ===
South Korea
4
Sendai Gymnasium, Court 3
28 April 2006, 17:00 UTC+9

Singapore
1

			1	2	3
1	(South Korea) (Singapore)	Hwang Hye-youn; Li Li	16; 21	17; 21
2	(South Korea) (Singapore)	Lee Hyo-jung / Lee Kyung-won; Jiang Yanmei / Li Yujia	21; 19	21; 17
3	(South Korea) (Singapore)	Lee Yun-hwa; Xing Aiying	21; 15	21; 13
4	(South Korea) (Singapore)	Ha Jung-eun / Hwang Yu-mi; Frances Liu / Shinta Mulia Sari	21; 10	21; 10
5	(South Korea) (Singapore)	Jun Jae-youn; Jiang Yanmei	13; 21	21; 16	21; 11

=== Germany vs Singapore ===
Germany
3
Sendai Gymnasium, Court 4
29 April 2006, 17:00 UTC+9

Singapore
2

			1	2	3
1	(Germany) (Singapore)	Huaiwen Xu; Li Li	21; 9	21; 9
2	(Germany) (Singapore)	Nicole Grether / Juliane Schenk; Jiang Yanmei / Frances Liu	21; 15	23; 21
3	(Germany) (Singapore)	Juliane Schenk; Xing Aiying	21; 16	21; 17
4	(Germany) (Singapore)	Carina Mette / Birgit Overzier; Li Yujia / Shinta Mulia Sari	17; 21	20; 22
5	(Germany) (Singapore)	Petra Overzier; Jiang Yanmei	9; 21	19; 21

=== South Korea vs Germany ===
South Korea
4
Sendai Gymnasium, Court 4
30 April 2006, 17:00 UTC+9

Germany
1

			1	2	3
1	(South Korea) (Germany)	Seo Yoon-hee; Huaiwen Xu	8; 21	14; 21
2	(South Korea) (Germany)	Lee Hyo-jung / Lee Kyung-won; Sandra Marinello / Michaela Peiffer	21; 8	21; 7
3	(South Korea) (Germany)	Lee Yun-hwa; Petra Overzier	21; 15	20; 22	21; 11
4	(South Korea) (Germany)	Ha Jung-eun / Hwang Yu-mi; Carina Mette / Birgit Overzier	21; 18	21; 19
5	(South Korea) (Germany)	Jun Jae-youn; Nicole Grether	21; 15	21; 7

== Group Z ==
Pos	Team	Pld	W	L	MF	MA	MD	GF	GA	GD	PF	PA	PD	Pts	Qualification
1	Japan (H)	2	2	0	10	0	+10	20	0	+20	420	145	+275	2	Quarter-finals
2	New Zealand	2	1	1	5	5	0	10	10	0	306	332	−26	1	Round of 16
3	South Africa	2	0	2	0	10	−10	0	20	−20	171	420	−249	0	Round of 16

Source: BadmintonCN
(H) Host

=== Japan vs South Africa ===
Japan
5
Sendai Gymnasium, Court 3
28 April 2006, 14:00 UTC+9

South Africa
0

			1	2	3
1	(Japan) (South Africa)	Kaori Mori; Michelle Edwards	21; 4	21; 8
2	(Japan) (South Africa)	Kumiko Ogura / Reiko Shiota; Michelle Edwards / Jade Morgan	21; 4	21; 6
3	(Japan) (South Africa)	Eriko Hirose; Kerry-Lee Harrington	21; 4	21; 1
4	(Japan) (South Africa)	Aki Akao / Tomomi Matsuo; Stacey Doubell / Kerry-Lee Harrington	21; 7	21; 5
5	(Japan) (South Africa)	Kanako Yonekura; Stacey Doubell	21; 6	21; 4

=== New Zealand vs South Africa ===
New Zealand
5
Sendai Gymnasium, Court 4
29 April 2006, 14:00 UTC+9

South Africa
0

			1	2	3
1	(New Zealand) (South Africa)	Rachel Hindley; Michelle Edwards	21; 11	21; 13
2	(New Zealand) (South Africa)	Renee Flavell; Kerry-Lee Harrington	21; 12	21; 13
3	(New Zealand) (South Africa)	Michelle Chan; Stacey Doubell	21; 13	21; 17
4	(New Zealand) (South Africa)	Rachel Hindley / Sara Runesten-Petersen; Michelle Edwards / Jade Morgan	21; 11	21; 16
5	(New Zealand) (South Africa)	Donna Cranston / Renee Flavell; Stacey Doubell / Kerry-Lee Harrington	21; 9	21; 7

=== Japan vs New Zealand ===
Japan
5
Sendai Gymnasium, Court 3
30 April 2006, 14:00 UTC+9

New Zealand
0

			1	2	3
1	(Japan) (New Zealand)	Kaori Mori; Rachel Hindley	21; 6	21; 8
2	(Japan) (New Zealand)	Kumiko Ogura / Reiko Shiota; Rachel Hindley / Sara Runesten-Petersen	21; 11	21; 12
3	(Japan) (New Zealand)	Eriko Hirose; Michelle Chan	21; 11	21; 14
4	(Japan) (New Zealand)	Miyuki Maeda / Satoko Suetsuna; Donna Cranston / Renee Flavell	21; 12	21; 8
5	(Japan) (New Zealand)	Yu Hirayama; Donna Cranston	21; 9	21; 5
