= 2006 Thomas Cup knockout stage =

2006 Knockout stage of the Thomas Cup badminton team championship

The knockout stage for the 2006 Thomas Cup in Japan began on 1 May 2006 with the round of 16 play-offs and ended on 7 May 2006 with the final.

== Group results ==
The winners of each group were exempted until the quarter-finals stage while the rest of the teams competed in the round of 16 for a place in the final eight.

Group	Winners	Runners-up	Third place
A	China	India	Germany
B	Indonesia	South Korea	New Zealand
C	Denmark	Japan	South Africa
D	Malaysia	England	United States

== Bracket ==
Round of 16
China
Bye
South Africa	0
England	3
Indonesia
Bye
Japan	3
United States	0
India	3
New Zealand	0
Bye
Denmark
South Korea	3
Germany	0
Bye
Malaysia

Quarter-finals
China	3
England	0
Indonesia	3
Japan	1
India	0
Denmark	3
South Korea	2
Malaysia	3

Semi-finals
China	3
Indonesia	0
Denmark	3
Malaysia	2

Final
China	3
Denmark	0

== Round of 16 ==
=== Japan vs United States ===
Japan
3
Sendai Gymnasium, Court 2
1 May 2006, 14:00 UTC+9

United States
0

			1	2	3
1	(Japan) (United States)	Shōji Satō; Raju Rai	21; 8	21; 14
2	(Japan) (United States)	Keita Masuda / Tadashi Ōtsuka; Tony Gunawan / Khan Malaythong	21; 18	21; 15
3	(Japan) (United States)	Yousuke Nakanishi; Raju Rai	21; 11	23; 21
4	(Japan) (United States)	Shintaro Ikeda / Shuichi Sakamoto; Raju Rai / Ronald Sou				not played
5	(Japan) (United States)	Sho Sasaki; Howard Shu				not played

=== England vs South Africa ===
England
3
Sendai Gymnasium, Court 4
1 May 2006, 14:00 UTC+9

South Africa
0

			1	2	3
1	(England) (South Africa)	Andrew Smith; Chris Dednam	21; 11	21; 12
2	(England) (South Africa)	Nicholas Kidd; Roelof Dednam	21; 12	21; 12
3	(England) (South Africa)	Rajiv Ouseph; Willem Viljoen	21; 18	21; 6
4	(England) (South Africa)	Chris Langridge / Chris Tonks; Chris Dednam / Roelof Dednam				not played
5	(England) (South Africa)	David Lindley / Kristian Roebuck; Dorian James / Willem Viljoen				not played

=== South Korea vs Germany ===
South Korea
3
Sendai Gymnasium, Court 2
1 May 2006, 17:00 UTC+9

Germany
0

			1	2	3
1	(South Korea) (Germany)	Lee Hyun-il; Björn Joppien	21; 17	22; 20
2	(South Korea) (Germany)	Jung Jae-sung / Lee Yong-dae; Kristof Hopp / Ingo Kindervater	22; 20	21; 15
3	(South Korea) (Germany)	Park Sung-hwan; Roman Spitko	21; 14	18; 21	21; 18
4	(South Korea) (Germany)	Han Sang-hoon / Hwang Ji-man; Tim Dettmann / Michael Fuchs				not played
5	(South Korea) (Germany)	Jang Young-soo; Marcel Reuter				not played

=== India vs New Zealand ===
India
3
Sendai Gymnasium, Court 4
1 May 2006, 17:00 UTC+9

New Zealand
0

			1	2	3
1	(India) (New Zealand)	Anup Sridhar; John Moody	21; 15	21; 9
2	(India) (New Zealand)	Arvind Bhat; Henry Tam	21; 17	21; 5
3	(India) (New Zealand)	Nikhil Kanetkar; Craig Cooper	21; 13	18; 21	21; 10
4	(India) (New Zealand)	Thomas Kurian / Jaseel P. Ismail; John Moody / Daniel Shirley				not played
5	(India) (New Zealand)	Valiyaveetil Diju / Rupesh Kumar K. T. Craig Cooper / Henry Tam				not played

== Quarter-finals ==
=== China vs England ===
China
3
Tokyo Metropolitan Gymnasium, Court 1
3 May 2006, 13:00 UTC+9

England
0

			1	2	3
1	(China) (England)	Lin Dan; Andrew Smith	18; 21	21; 12	21; 12
2	(China) (England)	Cai Yun / Fu Haifeng; Ian Palethorpe / Kristian Roebuck	21; 13	21; 12
3	(China) (England)	Bao Chunlai; Nicholas Kidd	21; 12	21; 15
4	(China) (England)	Guo Zhendong / Xie Zhongbo; Chris Langridge / David Lindley				not played
5	(China) (England)	Chen Jin; Rajiv Ouseph				not played

=== Indonesia vs Japan ===
Indonesia
3
Tokyo Metropolitan Gymnasium, Court 2
3 May 2006, 13:00 UTC+9

Japan
1

			1	2	3
1	(Indonesia) (Japan)	Taufik Hidayat; Shōji Satō	22; 20	16; 21	22; 24
2	(Indonesia) (Japan)	Luluk Hadiyanto / Alvent Yulianto; Keita Masuda / Tadashi Ōtsuka	21; 13	21; 16
3	(Indonesia) (Japan)	Sony Dwi Kuncoro; Sho Sasaki	22; 20	21; 7
4	(Indonesia) (Japan)	Markis Kido / Hendra Setiawan; Shintaro Ikeda / Shuichi Sakamoto	21; 15	21; 18
5	(Indonesia) (Japan)	Simon Santoso; Koichi Saeki				not played

=== Malaysia vs South Korea ===
Malaysia
3
Tokyo Metropolitan Gymnasium, Court 1
3 May 2006, 17:00 UTC+9

South Korea
2

			1	2	3
1	(Malaysia) (South Korea)	Lee Chong Wei; Lee Hyun-il	21; 17	21; 14
2	(Malaysia) (South Korea)	Chan Chong Ming / Koo Kien Keat; Hwang Ji-man / Jung Jae-sung	18; 21	22; 24
3	(Malaysia) (South Korea)	Wong Choong Hann; Park Sung-hwan	6; 10			retired
4	(Malaysia) (South Korea)	Choong Tan Fook / Lee Wan Wah; Han Sang-hoon / Lee Yong-dae	21; 18	21; 9
5	(Malaysia) (South Korea)	Muhammad Hafiz Hashim; Jang Young-soo	21; 17	21; 10

=== Denmark vs India ===
Denmark
3
Tokyo Metropolitan Gymnasium, Court 2
3 May 2006, 17:00 UTC+9

India
0

			1	2	3
1	(Denmark) (India)	Peter Gade; Chetan Anand	21; 14	21; 8
2	(Denmark) (India)	Jens Eriksen / Martin Lundgaard Hansen; Valiyaveetil Diju / Rupesh Kumar K. T.	21; 14	21; 19
3	(Denmark) (India)	Kenneth Jonassen; Anup Sridhar	21; 12	21; 11
4	(Denmark) (India)	Lars Paaske / Jonas Rasmussen; Thomas Kurian / Jaseel P. Ismail				not played
5	(Denmark) (India)	Niels Christian Kaldau; Arvind Bhat				not played

== Semi-finals ==
=== China vs Indonesia ===
China
3
Tokyo Metropolitan Gymnasium, Court 1
5 May 2006, 13:00 UTC+9

Indonesia
0

			1	2	3
1	(China) (Indonesia)	Lin Dan; Taufik Hidayat	21; 16	21; 8
2	(China) (Indonesia)	Cai Yun / Fu Haifeng; Luluk Hadiyanto / Alvent Yulianto	24; 22	21; 17
3	(China) (Indonesia)	Bao Chunlai; Sony Dwi Kuncoro	21; 17	24; 22
4	(China) (Indonesia)	Guo Zhendong / Xie Zhongbo; Markis Kido / Hendra Setiawan				not played
5	(China) (Indonesia)	Chen Jin; Simon Santoso				not played

=== Denmark vs Malaysia ===
Denmark
3
Tokyo Metropolitan Gymnasium, Court 1
5 May 2006, 17:00 UTC+9

Malaysia
2

			1	2	3
1	(Denmark) (Malaysia)	Peter Gade; Lee Chong Wei	21; 19	21; 18
2	(Denmark) (Malaysia)	Jens Eriksen / Martin Lundgaard Hansen; Chan Chong Ming / Koo Kien Keat	17; 21	30; 28	6; 21
3	(Denmark) (Malaysia)	Kenneth Jonassen; Muhammad Hafiz Hashim	20; 22	21; 12	21; 17
4	(Denmark) (Malaysia)	Mathias Boe / Carsten Mogensen; Choong Tan Fook / Lee Wan Wah	13; 21	21; 15	19; 21
5	(Denmark) (Malaysia)	Joachim Persson; Kuan Beng Hong	21; 12	21; 19

== Final ==
=== China vs Denmark ===
China
3
Tokyo Metropolitan Gymnasium, Court 1
7 May 2006, 13:00 UTC+9

Denmark
0

			1	2	3
1	(China) (Denmark)	Lin Dan; Peter Gade	21; 17	21; 19
2	(China) (Denmark)	Cai Yun / Fu Haifeng; Jens Eriksen / Martin Lundgaard Hansen	19; 21	21; 11	21; 18
3	(China) (Denmark)	Bao Chunlai; Kenneth Jonassen	21; 12	12; 21	21; 12
4	(China) (Denmark)	Xie Zhongbo / Zheng Bo; Mathias Boe / Carsten Mogensen				not played
5	(China) (Denmark)	Chen Jin; Joachim Persson				not played
