= 2006 Thomas Cup group stage =

Badminton team tournament in Sendai

The 2006 Thomas Cup group stage was held at Sendai Gymnasium in Sendai, Japan, from 28 to 30 April 2006.

The group stage was first stage of the tournament where the group winner advanced to the quarter-finals while the remaining teams advanced to the round of 16 in the knockout stages.

== Draw ==
The original draw for the tournament was conducted in 26 February 2006. The 12 teams will be drawn into four groups each containing three teams.

=== Group composition ===
Group
Group A	Group B	Group C	Group D
China; Germany; India	Indonesia; South Korea; New Zealand	Denmark; Japan (Host); South Africa	England; Malaysia; United States

== Group A ==
Pos	Team	Pld	W	L	MF	MA	MD	GF	GA	GD	PF	PA	PD	Pts	Qualification
1	China	2	2	0	10	0	+10	20	2	+18	459	271	+188	2	Quarter-finals
2	India	2	1	1	3	7	−4	7	16	−9	340	443	−103	1	Round of 16
3	Germany	2	0	2	2	8	−6	7	16	−9	355	440	−85	0	Round of 16

Source: BadmintonCN

=== China vs India ===
China
5
Sendai Gymnasium, Court 2
28 April 2006, 14:00 UTC+9

India
0

			1	2	3
1	(China) (India)	Lin Dan; Chetan Anand	21; 8	21; 23	21; 11
2	(China) (India)	Cai Yun / Fu Haifeng; Valiyaveetil Diju / Rupesh Kumar K. T.	21; 5	21; 16
3	(China) (India)	Chen Jin; Anup Sridhar	21; 14	21; 10
4	(China) (India)	Guo Zhendong / Zheng Bo; Thomas Kurian / Jaseel P. Ismail	21; 6	21; 10
5	(China) (India)	Xia Xuanze; Arvind Bhat	21; 15	21; 10

=== Germany vs India ===
Germany
2
Sendai Gymnasium, Court 2
29 April 2006, 14:00 UTC+9

India
3

			1	2	3
1	(Germany) (India)	Björn Joppien; Chetan Anand	21; 17	21; 12
2	(Germany) (India)	Conrad Hückstädt; Anup Sridhar	20; 22	21; 14	6; 21
3	(Germany) (India)	Roman Spitko; Arvind Bhat	14; 21	21; 17	16; 21
4	(Germany) (India)	Kristof Hopp / Ingo Kindervater; Thomas Kurian / Jaseel P. Ismail	21; 9	21; 16
5	(Germany) (India)	Michael Fuchs / Roman Spitko; Valiyaveetil Diju / Rupesh Kumar K. T.	18; 21	12; 21

=== China vs Germany ===
China
5
Sendai Gymnasium, Court 2
30 April 2006, 14:00 UTC+9

Germany
0

			1	2	3
1	(China) (Germany)	Lin Dan; Björn Joppien	22; 20	21; 7
2	(China) (Germany)	Cai Yun / Fu Haifeng; Kristof Hopp / Ingo Kindervater	21; 8	21; 13
3	(China) (Germany)	Bao Chunlai; Roman Spitko	22; 20	21; 18
4	(China) (Germany)	Guo Zhendong / Xie Zhongbo; Tim Dettmann / Michael Fuchs	21; 12	21; 12
5	(China) (Germany)	Chen Jin; Marcel Reuter	16; 21	21; 7	21; 5

== Group B ==
Pos	Team	Pld	W	L	MF	MA	MD	GF	GA	GD	PF	PA	PD	Pts	Qualification
1	Indonesia	2	2	0	8	2	+6	16	5	+11	406	313	+93	2	Quarter-finals
2	South Korea	2	1	1	7	3	+4	15	7	+8	423	323	+100	1	Round of 16
3	New Zealand	2	0	2	0	10	−10	0	19	−19	206	399	−193	0	Round of 16

Source: BadmintonCN.com

=== South Korea vs New Zealand ===
South Korea
5
Sendai Gymnasium, Court 4
28 April 2006, 14:00 UTC+9

New Zealand
0

			1	2	3
1	(South Korea) (New Zealand)	Lee Hyun-il; John Moody	21; 16	21; 13
2	(South Korea) (New Zealand)	Shon Seung-mo; Henry Tam	21; 10	21; 7
3	(South Korea) (New Zealand)	Park Sung-hwan; Craig Cooper	21; 10	21; 7
4	(South Korea) (New Zealand)	Jung Jae-sung / Lee Yong-dae; John Moody / Henry Tam	21; 9	21; 6
5	(South Korea) (New Zealand)	Han Sang-hoon / Hwang Ji-man; Craig Cooper / Daniel Shirley	21; 12	21; 16

=== Indonesia vs New Zealand ===
Indonesia
5
Sendai Gymnasium, Court 2
29 April 2006, 17:00 UTC+9

New Zealand
0

			1	2	3
1	(Indonesia) (New Zealand)	Taufik Hidayat; John Moody	21; 19	21; 15
2	(Indonesia) (New Zealand)	Sony Dwi Kuncoro; Henry Tam	21; 10	21; 1
3	(Indonesia) (New Zealand)	Simon Santoso; Craig Cooper	21; 11	21; 7
4	(Indonesia) (New Zealand)	Luluk Hadiyanto / Alvent Yulianto; John Moody / Henry Tam	21; 12	21; 7
5	(Indonesia) (New Zealand)	Sigit Budiarto / Candra Wijaya; Craig Cooper / Daniel Shirley	21; 18			retired

=== South Korea vs Indonesia ===
South Korea
2
Sendai Gymnasium, Court 2
30 April 2006, 17:00 UTC+9

Indonesia
3

			1	2	3
1	(South Korea) (Indonesia)	Lee Hyun-il; Taufik Hidayat	16; 21	21; 10	21; 8
2	(South Korea) (Indonesia)	Jung Jae-sung / Lee Yong-dae; Sigit Budiarto / Candra Wijaya	21; 16	21; 14
3	(South Korea) (Indonesia)	Shon Seung-mo; Sony Dwi Kuncoro	9; 21	15; 21
4	(South Korea) (Indonesia)	Han Sang-hoon / Hwang Ji-man; Luluk Hadiyanto / Alvent Yulianto	24; 22	17; 21	14; 21
5	(South Korea) (Indonesia)	Park Sung-hwan; Simon Santoso	18; 21	16; 21

== Group C ==
Pos	Team	Pld	W	L	MF	MA	MD	GF	GA	GD	PF	PA	PD	Pts	Qualification
1	Denmark	2	2	0	10	0	+10	20	2	+18	451	285	+166	2	Quarter-finals
2	Japan (H)	2	1	1	5	5	0	12	10	+2	403	339	+64	1	Round of 16
3	South Africa	2	0	2	0	10	−10	0	20	−20	190	420	−230	0	Round of 16

Source: BadmintonCN.com
(H) Host

=== Denmark vs South Africa ===
Denmark
5
Sendai Gymnasium, Court 4
28 April 2006, 17:00 UTC+9

South Africa
0

			1	2	3
1	(Denmark) (South Africa)	Peter Gade; Chris Dednam	21; 6	21; 9
2	(Denmark) (South Africa)	Niels Christian Kaldau; Roelof Dednam	21; 5	21; 12
3	(Denmark) (South Africa)	Joachim Persson; Willem Viljoen	21; 7	21; 12
4	(Denmark) (South Africa)	Jens Eriksen / Martin Lundgaard; Chris Dednam / Roelof Dednam	21; 12	21; 13
5	(Denmark) (South Africa)	Mathias Boe / Carsten Mogensen; Dorian James / Willem Viljoen	21; 5	21; 11

=== Japan vs South Africa ===
Japan
5
Sendai Gymnasium, Court 3
29 April 2006, 14:00 UTC+9

South Africa
0

			1	2	3
1	(Japan) (South Africa)	Shōji Satō; Chris Dednam	21; 7	21; 11
2	(Japan) (South Africa)	Yousuke Nakanishi; Roelof Dednam	21; 13	21; 11
3	(Japan) (South Africa)	Sho Sasaki; Willem Viljoen	21; 5	21; 10
4	(Japan) (South Africa)	Keita Masuda / Tadashi Ōtsuka; Chris Dednam / Roelof Dednam	21; 16	21; 10
5	(Japan) (South Africa)	Keishi Kawaguchi / Shuichi Nakao; Dorian James / Willem Viljoen	21; 7	21; 8

=== Denmark vs Japan ===
Denmark
5
Sendai Gymnasium, Court 3
30 April 2006, 17:00 UTC+9

Japan
0

			1	2	3
1	(Denmark) (Japan)	Peter Gade; Shōji Satō	21; 9	21; 11
2	(Denmark) (Japan)	Jens Eriksen / Martin Lundgaard Hansen; Shintaro Ikeda / Shuichi Sakamoto	21; 14	14; 21	21; 18
3	(Denmark) (Japan)	Kenneth Jonassen; Yousuke Nakanishi	21; 17	21; 19
4	(Denmark) (Japan)	Lars Paaske / Jonas Rasmussen; Keishi Kawaguchi / Shuichi Nakao	21; 16	17; 21	21; 17
5	(Denmark) (Japan)	Niels Christian Kaldau; Koichi Saeki	21; 14	21; 16

== Group D ==
Pos	Team	Pld	W	L	MF	MA	MD	GF	GA	GD	PF	PA	PD	Pts	Qualification
1	Malaysia	2	2	0	10	0	+10	20	2	+18	462	298	+164	2	Quarter-finals
2	England	2	1	1	3	7	−4	8	14	−6	383	435	−52	1	Round of 16
3	United States	2	0	2	2	8	−6	5	17	−12	337	449	−112	0	Round of 16

Source: BadmintonCN.com

=== Malaysia vs United States ===
Malaysia
5
Sendai Gymnasium, Court 2
28 April 2006, 17:00 UTC+9

United States
0

			1	2	3
1	(Malaysia) (United States)	Lee Chong Wei; Raju Rai	21; 9	21; 11
2	(Malaysia) (United States)	Wong Choong Hann; Eric Go	21; 14	21; 9
3	(Malaysia) (United States)	Muhammad Hafiz Hashim; Howard Shu	21; 3	21; 7
4	(Malaysia) (United States)	Choong Tan Fook / Lee Wan Wah; Howard Bach / Tony Gunawan	23; 21	22; 24	21; 17
5	(Malaysia) (United States)	Koo Kien Keat / Tan Boon Heong; Eric Go / Ronald Sou	21; 8	21; 7

=== England vs United States ===
England
3
Sendai Gymnasium, Court 3
29 April 2006, 17:00 UTC+9

United States
2

			1	2	3
1	(England) (United States)	Andrew Smith; Raju Rai	21; 23	9; 21
2	(England) (United States)	Nicholas Kidd; Eric Go	21; 18	21; 15
3	(England) (United States)	Rajiv Ouseph; Khan Malaythong	21; 13	21; 15
4	(England) (United States)	Ian Palethorpe / Kristian Roebuck; Howard Bach / Tony Gunawan	29; 27	13; 21	17; 21
5	(England) (United States)	Chris Langridge / David Lindley; Khan Malaythong / Raju Rai	21; 17	21; 16

=== Malaysia vs England ===
Malaysia
5
Sendai Gymnasium, Court 4
30 April 2006, 14:00 UTC+9

England
0

			1	2	3
1	(Malaysia) (England)	Wong Choong Hann; Shōji Satō	21; 16	21; 10
2	(Malaysia) (England)	Chan Chong Ming / Koo Kien Keat; Ian Palethorpe / Kristian Roebuck	21; 5	21; 17
3	(Malaysia) (England)	Muhammad Hafiz Hashim; Nicholas Kidd	24; 22	21; 14
4	(Malaysia) (England)	Chew Choon Eng / Tan Boon Heong; Chris Langridge / David Lindley	21; 16	21; 13
5	(Malaysia) (England)	Kuan Beng Hong; Rajiv Ouseph	21; 18	15; 21	21; 16
