= 2006 Thomas & Uber Cup =

Tournament details
- Dates: 28 April – 7 May
- Edition: 24th (Thomas Cup); 21st (Uber Cup)
- Level: International
- Venue: Sendai Gymnasium; Tokyo Metropolitan Gymnasium
- Location: Sendai and Tokyo, Japan

The 2006 Thomas & Uber Cup was held from 28 April to 7 May in Sendai and Tokyo, Japan. It was the 24th tournament of Thomas Cup and 21st tournament of Uber Cup, men's and women's badminton tournaments.

Sendai hosted all of the group stage and play-off matches while Tokyo hosted the event starting from the quarter-finals until the final.

This was first time the Thomas & Uber Cup was played with a three-game 21-point scoring system.

China emerged as champions of both tournaments after beating Denmark and Netherlands in the men's and women's competitions respectively.

== Host city selection ==
Japan, which was competing with Indonesia and the United States for hosting the 2004 Thomas and Uber Cup finals, was awarded with this event.

== Venues ==
- Sendai Gymnasium
- Tokyo Metropolitan Gymnasium

== Teams ==
The following nations from five continents, shown by region, qualified for the 2006 Thomas & Uber Cup. Of the sixteen nations, defending champion of both tournaments China and host Japan qualified automatically and did not play the qualification round.

Thomas & Uber Cup

- China
- England
- Germany
- Japan
- (South Korea) Korea
- New Zealand
- United States
- South Africa

Thomas Cup

- Denmark
- India
- Indonesia
- Malaysia

Uber Cup

- Chinese Taipei
- Hong Kong
- Netherlands
- Singapore

== Medal summary ==
=== Medalists ===
Event	Gold	Silver	Bronze
Thomas Cup	China; Lin Dan; Chen Hong; Bao Chunlai; Chen Jin; Xia Xuanze; Cai Yun; Fu Haifeng; Xie Zhongbo; Guo Zhendong; Zheng Bo	Denmark; Peter Gade; Kenneth Jonassen; Niels Christian Kaldau; Joachim Persson; Jens Eriksen; Martin Lundgaard Hansen; Jonas Rasmussen; Lars Paaske; Mathias Boe; Carsten Mogensen	Indonesia; Taufik Hidayat; Sony Dwi Kuncoro; Simon Santoso; Markus Wijanu; Candra Wijaya; Sigit Budiarto; Alvent Yulianto; Luluk Hadiyanto; Markis Kido; Hendra Setiawan
Thomas Cup	China; Lin Dan; Chen Hong; Bao Chunlai; Chen Jin; Xia Xuanze; Cai Yun; Fu Haifeng; Xie Zhongbo; Guo Zhendong; Zheng Bo	Denmark; Peter Gade; Kenneth Jonassen; Niels Christian Kaldau; Joachim Persson; Jens Eriksen; Martin Lundgaard Hansen; Jonas Rasmussen; Lars Paaske; Mathias Boe; Carsten Mogensen	Malaysia; Lee Chong Wei; Wong Choong Hann; Muhammad Hafiz Hashim; Kuan Beng Hong; Chan Chong Ming; Koo Kien Keat; Choong Tan Fook; Lee Wan Wah; Chew Choon Eng; Tan Boon Heong
Uber Cup	China; Zhang Ning; Xie Xingfang; Jiang Yanjiao; Lu Lan; Gao Ling; Huang Sui; Yang Wei; Zhang Jiewen; Yu Yang; Du Jing	Netherlands; Mia Audina; Yao Jie; Judith Meulendijks; Rachel van Cutsen; Karina de Wit; Paulien van Dooremalen; Ginny Severien	Germany; Xu Huaiwen; Juliane Schenk; Petra Overzier; Nicole Grether; Carina Mette; Birgit Overzier; Kathrin Piotrowski; Sandra Marinello; Michaela Peiffer
Uber Cup	China; Zhang Ning; Xie Xingfang; Jiang Yanjiao; Lu Lan; Gao Ling; Huang Sui; Yang Wei; Zhang Jiewen; Yu Yang; Du Jing	Netherlands; Mia Audina; Yao Jie; Judith Meulendijks; Rachel van Cutsen; Karina de Wit; Paulien van Dooremalen; Ginny Severien	Chinese Taipei; Cheng Shao-chieh; Chien Yu-chin; Huang Chia-hsin; Pai Min-jie; Hung Shih-chieh; Chou Chia-chi; Cheng Wen-hsing; Ku Pei-ting

=== Medal table ===
* Host nation (Japan)

Rank	Nation	Gold	Silver	Bronze	Total
1	China	2	0	0	2
2	Denmark	0	1	0	1
2	Netherlands	0	1	0	1
4	Chinese Taipei	0	0	1	1
4	Germany	0	0	1	1
4	Indonesia	0	0	1	1
4	Malaysia	0	0	1	1
Totals (7 entries)		2	2	4	8

== Thomas Cup ==
=== Group stage ===
==== Group A ====
Pos	Team	Pld	W	L	GF	GA	GD	PF	PA	PD	Pts	Qualification
1	China	2	2	0	20	2	+18	459	271	+188	2	Quarter-finals
2	India	2	1	1	7	16	−9	340	443	−103	1	Round of 16
3	Germany	2	0	2	7	16	−9	355	440	−85	0	Round of 16

Source: BadmintonCN

28 April 2006
14:00 UTC+9

China	5–0	India
Report

Sendai Gymnasium Court 2, Sendai

29 April 2006
14:00 UTC+9

Germany	2–3	India
Report

Sendai Gymnasium Court 2, Sendai

30 April 2006
14:00 UTC+9

China	5–0	Germany
Report

Sendai Gymnasium Court 2, Sendai

==== Group B ====
Pos	Team	Pld	W	L	GF	GA	GD	PF	PA	PD	Pts	Qualification
1	Indonesia	2	2	0	16	5	+11	406	313	+93	2	Quarter-finals
2	South Korea	2	1	1	15	7	+8	423	323	+100	1	Round of 16
3	New Zealand	2	0	2	0	19	−19	206	399	−193	0	Round of 16

Source: BadmintonCN.com

28 April 2006
14:00 UTC+9

South Korea	5–0	New Zealand
Report

Sendai Gymnasium Court 4, Sendai

29 April 2006
17:00 UTC+9

Indonesia	5–0	New Zealand
Report

Sendai Gymnasium Court 2, Sendai

30 April 2006
17:00 UTC+9

South Korea	2–3	Indonesia
Report

Sendai Gymnasium Court 2, Sendai

==== Group C ====
Pos	Team	Pld	W	L	GF	GA	GD	PF	PA	PD	Pts	Qualification
1	Denmark	2	2	0	20	2	+18	451	285	+166	2	Quarter-finals
2	Japan (H)	2	1	1	12	10	+2	403	339	+64	1	Round of 16
3	South Africa	2	0	2	0	20	−20	190	420	−230	0	Round of 16

Source: BadmintonCN.com
(H) Host

28 April 2006
17:00 UTC+9

Denmark	5–0	South Africa
Report

Sendai Gymnasium Court 4, Sendai

29 April 2006
14:00 UTC+9

Japan	5–0	South Africa
Report

Sendai Gymnasium Court 3, Sendai

30 April 2006
17:00 UTC+9

Denmark	5–0	Japan
Report

Sendai Gymnasium Court 3, Sendai

==== Group D ====
Pos	Team	Pld	W	L	GF	GA	GD	PF	PA	PD	Pts	Qualification
1	Malaysia	2	2	0	20	2	+18	462	298	+164	2	Quarter-finals
2	England	2	1	1	8	14	−6	383	435	−52	1	Round of 16
3	United States	2	0	2	5	17	−12	337	449	−112	0	Round of 16

Source: BadmintonCN.com

28 April 2006
17:00 UTC+9

Malaysia	5–0	United States
Report

Sendai Gymnasium Court 2, Sendai

29 April 2006
17:00 UTC+9

England	3–2	United States
Report

Sendai Gymnasium Court 3, Sendai

30 April 2006
14:00 UTC+9

Malaysia	5–0	England
Report

Sendai Gymnasium Court 4, Sendai

=== Knockout stage ===
==== Bracket ====
Round of 16
China
Bye
South Africa	0
England	3
Indonesia
Bye
Japan	3
United States	0
India	3
New Zealand	0
Bye
Denmark
South Korea	3
Germany	0
Bye
Malaysia

Quarter-finals
China	3
England	0
Indonesia	3
Japan	1
India	0
Denmark	3
South Korea	2
Malaysia	3

Semi-finals
China	3
Indonesia	0
Denmark	3
Malaysia	2

Final
China	3
Denmark	0

==== Round of 16 ====
1 May 2006
14:00 UTC+9

Japan	3–0	United States
Report

Sendai Gymnasium Court 2, Sendai

1 May 2006
14:00 UTC+9

England	3–0	South Africa
Report

Sendai Gymnasium Court 4, Sendai

1 May 2006
17:00 UTC+9

South Korea	3–0	Germany
Report

Sendai Gymnasium Court 2, Sendai

1 May 2006
17:00 UTC+9

India	3–0	New Zealand
Report

Sendai Gymnasium Court 4, Sendai

==== Quarter-finals ====
3 May 2006
13:00 UTC+9

China	3–0	England
Report

Tokyo Metropolitan Gymnasium Court 1, Tokyo

3 May 2006
13:00 UTC+9

Indonesia	3–1	Japan
Report

Tokyo Metropolitan Gymnasium Court 2, Tokyo

3 May 2006
17:00 UTC+9

Malaysia	3–2	South Korea
Report

Tokyo Metropolitan Gymnasium Court 1, Tokyo

3 May 2006
17:00 UTC+9

Denmark	3–0	India
Report

Tokyo Metropolitan Gymnasium Court 2, Tokyo

==== Semi-finals ====
5 May 2006
13:00 UTC+9

China	3–0	Indonesia
Report

Tokyo Metropolitan Gymnasium Court 1, Tokyo

5 May 2006
17:00 UTC+9

Denmark	3–2	Malaysia
Report

Tokyo Metropolitan Gymnasium Court 1, Tokyo

==== Final ====
7 May 2006
13:00 UTC+9

China	3–0	Denmark
Report

Tokyo Metropolitan Gymnasium Court 1, Tokyo

2006 Thomas Cup winner

China
Sixth title

== Uber Cup ==
=== Group stage ===
==== Group W ====
Pos	Team	Pld	W	L	GF	GA	GD	PF	PA	PD	Pts	Qualification
1	China	2	2	0	20	1	+19	444	193	+251	2	Quarter-finals
2	Chinese Taipei	2	1	1	11	10	+1	347	337	+10	1	Round of 16
3	United States	2	0	2	0	20	−20	159	420	−261	0	Round of 16

Source: BadmintonCN

28 April 2006
14:00 UTC+9

China	5–0	United States
Report

Sendai Gymnasium Court 1, Sendai

29 April 2006
14:00 UTC+9

Chinese Taipei	5–0	United States
Report

Sendai Gymnasium Court 1, Sendai

30 April 2006
17:00 UTC+7

China	5–0	Chinese Taipei
Report

Sendai Gymnasium Court 1, Sendai

==== Group X ====
Pos	Team	Pld	W	L	GF	GA	GD	PF	PA	PD	Pts	Qualification
1	Hong Kong	2	2	0	13	7	+6	377	329	+48	2	Quarter-finals
2	Netherlands	2	1	1	15	9	+6	454	412	+42	1	Round of 16
3	England	2	0	2	4	16	−12	306	396	−90	0	Round of 16

Source: BadmintonCN

28 April 2006
17:00 UTC+9

Netherlands	2–3	Hong Kong
Report

Sendai Gymnasium Court 1, Sendai

29 April 2006
17:00 UTC+9

England	2–3	Hong Kong
Report

Sendai Gymnasium Court 1, Sendai

30 April 2006
14:00 UTC+9

Netherlands	5–0	England
Report

Sendai Gymnasium Court 1, Sendai

==== Group Y ====
Pos	Team	Pld	W	L	GF	GA	GD	PF	PA	PD	Pts	Qualification
1	South Korea	2	2	0	16	4	+12	425	317	+108	2	Quarter-finals
2	Germany	2	1	1	7	12	−5	357	383	−26	1	Round of 16
3	Singapore	2	0	2	7	14	−7	325	407	−82	0	Round of 16

Source: BadmintonCN

28 April 2006
17:00 UTC+9

South Korea	4–1	Singapore
Report

Sendai Gymnasium Court 3, Sendai

29 April 2006
17:00 UTC+9

Germany	3–2	Singapore
Report

Sendai Gymnasium Court 4, Sendai

30 April 2006
19:00 UTC+7

Japan	4–1	New Zealand
Report

Sendai Gymnasium Court 4, Sendai

==== Group Z ====
Pos	Team	Pld	W	L	GF	GA	GD	PF	PA	PD	Pts	Qualification
1	Japan (H)	2	2	0	20	0	+20	420	145	+275	2	Quarter-finals
2	New Zealand	2	1	1	10	10	0	306	332	−26	1	Round of 16
3	South Africa	2	0	2	0	20	−20	171	420	−249	0	Round of 16

Source: BadmintonCN
(H) Host

28 April 2006
14:00 UTC+9

Japan	5–0	South Africa
Report

Sendai Gymnasium Court 3, Sendai

29 April 2006
14:00 UTC+9

New Zealand	5–0	South Africa
Report

Sendai Gymnasium Court 4, Sendai

30 April 2006
14:00 UTC+9

Japan	5–0	New Zealand
Report

Sendai Gymnasium Court 3, Sendai

=== Knockout stage ===
==== Bracket ====
Round of 16
China
Bye
Singapore	3
New Zealand	0
Hong Kong
Bye
Germany	3
South Africa	0
Chinese Taipei	3
England	0
Bye
South Korea
Netherlands	3
United States	0
Bye
Japan

Quarter-finals
China	3
Singapore	0
Hong Kong	2
Germany	3
Chinese Taipei	3
South Korea	2
Netherlands	3
Japan	2

Semi-finals
China	3
Germany	0
Chinese Taipei	0
Netherlands	3

Final
China	3
Netherlands	0

==== Round of 16 ====
1 May 2006
14:00 UTC+9

Singapore	3–0	New Zealand
Report

Sendai Gymnasium Court 2, Sendai

1 May 2006
14:00 UTC+9

Netherlands	3–0	United States
Report

Sendai Gymnasium Court 4, Sendai

1 May 2006
17:00 UTC+9

Chinese Taipei	3–0	England
Report

Sendai Gymnasium Court 2, Sendai

1 May 2006
17:00 UTC+9

Germany	3–0	South Africa
Report

Sendai Gymnasium Court 4, Sendai

==== Quarter-finals ====
3 May 2006
11:00 UTC+9

China	3–0	Singapore
Report

Tokyo Metropolitan Gymnasium Court 4, Tokyo

3 May 2006
11:00 UTC+9

Germany	3–2	Hong Kong
Report

Tokyo Metropolitan Gymnasium Court 3, Tokyo

3 May 2006
15:00 UTC+9

South Korea	2–3	Chinese Taipei
Report

Tokyo Metropolitan Gymnasium Court 4, Tokyo

3 May 2006
15:00 UTC+9

Japan	2–3	Netherlands
Report

Tokyo Metropolitan Gymnasium Court 3, Tokyo

==== Semi-finals ====
4 May 2006
13:00 UTC+9

China	3–0	Germany
Report

Tokyo Metropolitan Gymnasium Court 1, Tokyo

4 May 2006
17:00 UTC+9

Netherlands	3–0	Chinese Taipei
Report

Tokyo Metropolitan Gymnasium Court 1, Tokyo

==== Final ====
6 May 2006
19:00 UTC+7

China	3–0	Netherlands
Report

Tokyo Metropolitan Gymnasium Court 1, Tokyo

2006 Uber Cup winner

China
Tenth title
