= 2006 Uber Cup knockout stage =

2006 Knockout stage of the Uber Cup badminton team championship

The knockout stage for the 2006 Uber Cup in Japan began on 1 May 2006 with the round of 16 play-offs and ended on 6 May 2006 with the final.

== Group results ==
The winners of each group were exempted until the quarter-finals stage while the rest of the teams competed in the round of 16 for a place in the final eight.

Group	Winners	Runners-up	Third place
A	China	Chinese Taipei	United States
B	Hong Kong	Netherlands	England
C	South Korea	Germany	Singapore
D	Japan	New Zealand	South Africa

== Bracket ==
Round of 16
China
Bye
Singapore	3
New Zealand	0
Hong Kong
Bye
Germany	3
South Africa	0
Chinese Taipei	3
England	0
Bye
South Korea
Netherlands	3
United States	0
Bye
Japan

Quarter-finals
China	3
Singapore	0
Hong Kong	2
Germany	3
Chinese Taipei	3
South Korea	2
Netherlands	3
Japan	2

Semi-finals
China	3
Germany	0
Chinese Taipei	0
Netherlands	3

Final
China	3
Netherlands	0

== Round of 16 ==
=== Singapore vs New Zealand ===
Singapore
3
Sendai Gymnasium, Court 2
1 May 2006, 14:00 UTC+9

New Zealand
0

			1	2	3
1	(Singapore) (New Zealand)	Li Li; Rachel Hindley	21; 16	21; 14
2	(Singapore) (New Zealand)	Xing Aiying; Renee Flavell	21; 8	23; 11
3	(Singapore) (New Zealand)	Jiang Yanmei; Michelle Chan	21; 11	21; 19
4	(Singapore) (New Zealand)	Jiang Yanmei / Li Yujia; Rachel Hindley / Sara Runesten-Petersen				not played
5	(Singapore) (New Zealand)	Frances Liu / Shinta Mulia Sari; Donna Cranston / Renee Flavell				not played

=== Netherlands vs United States ===
Netherlands
3
Sendai Gymnasium, Court 4
1 May 2006, 14:00 UTC+9

United States
0

			1	2	3
1	(Netherlands) (United States)	Judith Meulendijks; Lili Zhou	21; 9	21; 5
2	(Netherlands) (United States)	Rachel van Cutsen; Eva Lee	11; 8			retired
3	(Netherlands) (United States)	Karina de Wit; Jamie Subandhi	21; 15	21; 5
4	(Netherlands) (United States)	Rachel van Cutsen / Paulien van Dooremalen; Eva Lee / Mesinee Mangkalakiri				not played
5	(Netherlands) (United States)	Karina de Wit / Ginny Severien; Jennifer Coleman / Lauren Todt				not played

=== Chinese Taipei vs England ===
Chinese Taipei
3
Sendai Gymnasium, Court 2
1 May 2006, 17:00 UTC+9

England
0

			1	2	3
1	(Chinese Taipei) (England)	Cheng Shao-chieh; Julia Mann	21; 8	21; 15
2	(Chinese Taipei) (England)	Chou Chia-chi / Ku Pei-ting; Suzanne Rayappan / Jenny Wallwork	11; 21	21; 17	21; 12
3	(Chinese Taipei) (England)	Chien Yu-chin; Jill Pittard	21; 15	21; 15
4	(Chinese Taipei) (England)	Huang Chia-hsin / Hung Shih-chieh; Natalie Munt / Joanne Nicholas				not played
5	(Chinese Taipei) (England)	Pai Min-jie; Elizabeth Cann				not played

=== Germany vs South Africa ===
Germany
3
Sendai Gymnasium, Court 4
1 May 2006, 17:00 UTC+9

South Africa
0

			1	2	3
1	(Germany) (South Africa)	Juliane Schenk; Michelle Edwards	21; 4	21; 7
2	(Germany) (South Africa)	Petra Overzier; Kerry-Lee Harrington	21; 7	21; 10
3	(Germany) (South Africa)	Nicole Grether; Stacey Doubell	21; 6	21; 8
4	(Germany) (South Africa)	Sandra Marinello / Michaela Peiffer; Michelle Edwards / Jade Morgan				not played
5	(Germany) (South Africa)	Carina Mette / Birgit Overzier; Stacey Doubell / Kerry-Lee Harrington				not played

== Quarter-finals ==
=== China vs Singapore ===
China
3
Tokyo Metropolitan Gymnasium, Court 4
3 May 2006, 11:00 UTC+9

Singapore
0

			1	2	3
1	(China) (Singapore)	Zhang Ning; Li Li	21; 18	21; 18
2	(China) (Singapore)	Jiang Yanjiao; Xing Aiying	21; 10	21; 7
3	(China) (Singapore)	Gao Ling / Huang Sui; Jiang Yanmei / Li Yujia	21; 5	21; 7
4	(China) (Singapore)	Lu Lan; Jiang Yanmei				not played
5	(China) (Singapore)	Yang Wei / Zhang Jiewen; Frances Liu / Shinta Mulia Sari				not played

=== Germany vs Hong Kong ===
Germany
3
Tokyo Metropolitan Gymnasium, Court 3
3 May 2006, 11:00 UTC+9

Hong Kong
2

			1	2	3
1	(Germany) (Hong Kong)	Huaiwen Xu; Wang Chen	21; 7	15; 21	12; 21
2	(Germany) (Hong Kong)	Juliane Schenk; Yip Pui Yin	21; 15	21; 12
3	(Germany) (Hong Kong)	Carina Mette / Birgit Overzier; Koon Wai Chee / Wang Chen	18; 21	21; 23
4	(Germany) (Hong Kong)	Petra Overzier; Olivia Wong Sin Yee	21; 9	21; 13
5	(Germany) (Hong Kong)	Nicole Grether / Juliane Schenk; Chau Hoi Wah / Wong Man Ching	21; 10	21; 9

=== South Korea vs Chinese Taipei ===
South Korea
2
Tokyo Metropolitan Gymnasium, Court 4
3 May 2006, 15:00 UTC+9

Chinese Taipei
3

			1	2	3
1	(South Korea) (Chinese Taipei)	Hwang Hye-youn; Cheng Shao-chieh	21; 13	14; 21	13; 21
2	(South Korea) (Chinese Taipei)	Lee Yun-hwa; Chien Yu-chin	11; 21	9; 21
3	(South Korea) (Chinese Taipei)	Ha Jung-eun / Hwang Yu-mi; Chou Chia-chi / Ku Pei-ting	21; 14	21; 13
4	(South Korea) (Chinese Taipei)	Jun Jae-youn; Huang Chia-hsin	21; 13	21; 9
5	(South Korea) (Chinese Taipei)	Lee Hyo-jung / Lee Kyung-won; Cheng Wen-hsing / Chien Yu-chin	15; 21	21; 17	20; 22

=== Japan vs Netherlands ===
Japan
2
Tokyo Metropolitan Gymnasium, Court 3
3 May 2006, 15:00 UTC+9

Netherlands
3

			1	2	3
1	(Japan) (Netherlands)	Kaori Mori; Mia Audina	21; 15	20; 22	21; 17
2	(Japan) (Netherlands)	Eriko Hirose; Judith Meulendijks	14; 21	21; 17	15; 21
3	(Japan) (Netherlands)	Kanako Yonekura; Karina de Wit	23; 21	13; 21	21; 14
4	(Japan) (Netherlands)	Kumiko Ogura / Reiko Shiota; Mia Audina / Judith Meulendijks	11; 21	16; 21
5	(Japan) (Netherlands)	Aki Akao / Tomomi Matsuda; Karina de Wit / Ginny Severien	21; 13	14; 21	15; 21

== Semi-finals ==
=== China vs Germany ===
China
3
Tokyo Metropolitan Gymnasium, Court 1
4 May 2006, 13:00 UTC+9

Germany
0

			1	2	3
1	(China) (Germany)	Zhang Ning; Xu Huaiwen	21; 17	21; 14
2	(China) (Germany)	Xie Xingfang; Juliane Schenk	21; 17	21; 16
3	(China) (Germany)	Yang Wei / Zhang Jiewen; Michaela Peiffer / Sandra Marinello	21; 9	21; 4
4	(China) (Germany)	Jiang Yanjiao; Petra Overzier				not played
5	(China) (Germany)	Du Jing / Yu Yang; Carina Mette / Birgit Overzier				not played

=== Netherlands vs Chinese Taipei ===
Netherlands
3
Tokyo Metropolitan Gymnasium, Court 1
4 May 2006, 17:00 UTC+9

Chinese Taipei
0

			1	2	3
1	(Netherlands) (Chinese Taipei)	Mia Audina; Cheng Shao-chieh	21; 19	21; 17
2	(Netherlands) (Chinese Taipei)	Judith Meulendijks; Chien Yu-chin	22; 20	21; 17
3	(Netherlands) (Chinese Taipei)	Karina de Wit; Pai Min-jie	21; 16	14; 21	21; 15
4	(Netherlands) (Chinese Taipei)	Mia Audina / Judith Meulendijks; Cheng Wen-hsing / Chien Yu-chin				not played
5	(Netherlands) (Chinese Taipei)	Karina de Wit / Ginny Severien; Chou Chia-chi / Ku Pei-ting				not played

== Final ==
=== China vs Netherlands ===
China
3
Tokyo Metropolitan Gymnasium, Court 1
6 May 2006, 13:00 UTC+9

Netherlands
0

			1	2	3
1	(China) (Netherlands)	Zhang Ning; Mia Audina	21; 18	19; 21	21; 18
2	(China) (Netherlands)	Xie Xingfang; Judith Meulendijks	21; 17	21; 18
3	(China) (Netherlands)	Jiang Yanjiao; Rachel van Cutsen	21; 9	21; 7
4	(China) (Netherlands)	Gao Ling / Huang Sui; Mia Audina / Judith Meulendijks				not played
5	(China) (Netherlands)	Yang Wei / Zhang Jiewen; Rachel van Cutsen / Paulien van Dooremalen				not played
