= 2017 BWF World Senior Championships – 35+ =

Tournament details
- Dates: 11 September 2017 – 17 September 2017
- Edition: 8
- Level: International
- Competitors: 78 from 16 nations
- Venue: Rajiv Gandhi Indoor Stadium
- Location: Kochi, India

Champions
- Men's singles: (Russia) Stanislav Pukhov
- Women's singles: (Russia) Olga Arkhangelskaya
- Men's doubles: (India) Rupesh Kumar K. T. (India) Sanave Thomas
- Women's doubles: (Russia) Olga Arkhangelskaya (Russia) Maria Koloskova
- Mixed doubles: (Russia) Stanislav Pukhov (Russia) Maria Koloskova

This are the results of 2017 BWF World Senior Championships' 35+ events.

== Men's singles ==
=== Seeds ===
1. (Russia) Stanislav Pukhov (champion, gold medal)
2. (Czech Republic) Jan Fröhlich (second round)
3. (Thailand) Naruenart Chuaymak (final, silver medal)
4. (Denmark) Morten Eilby Rasmussen (quarterfinals)

=== Finals ===
Semifinals
1 | (Russia) Stanislav Pukhov | 21 | 21
(Germany) Felix Hoffmann | 13 | 13
3 | (Thailand) Naruenart Chuaymak | 8
(India) Nikhil Kanetkar | 3^{r}

Final
1 | (Russia) Stanislav Pukhov | 21 | 21
3 | (Thailand) Naruenart Chuaymak | 13 | 19

=== Top half ===
==== Section 1 ====
First Round
(Switzerland) R Lienhard | 7 | 12
(England) R Kapoor | 21 | 21
(Japan) H Kashiwabara | 8 | 7
(India) A S Gupta | 21 | 21
(Hungary) K Horvath | 21 | 21
(Sweden) A Ström | 19 | 13

Second Round
1 | (Russia) S Pukhov | 21 | 21
(England) R Kapoor | 11 | 16
(India) A S Gupta | 21 | 21
(Hungary) K Horvath | 18 | 19

Quarterfinals
1 | (Russia) S Pukhov | 25 | 19 | 21
(India) A S Gupta | 23 | 21 | 8

==== Section 2 ====
First Round
4 | (Denmark) M E Rasmussen | 21 | 21
(England) R Sutoto | 13 | 17
(India) A Dayal | 21 | 16 | 21
(Switzerland) P Gabella | 17 | 21 | 11
(Germany) F Hoffmann | 21 | 21
(Japan) M Okawara | 18 | 15
(France) A Morin | 17 | 17
(Sweden) J Bjorka | 21 | 21

Second Round
4 | (Denmark) M E Rasmussen | 21 | 21
(India) A Dayal | 11 | 15
(Germany) F Hoffmann | 21 | 21
(Sweden) J Bjorka | 8 | 6

Quarterfinals
4 | (Denmark) M E Rasmussen | 9 | 18
(Germany) F Hoffmann | 21 | 21

=== Bottom half ===
==== Section 3 ====
First Round
(England) P Freeman | 5 | 7
(India) L Pannu | 21 | 21
(France) P Wolff | 11 | 11
(Sweden) M Jansson | 21 | 21
(Japan) K Sato | 17 | 21 | 21
(Germany) F Dietrich | 21 | 18 | 18
(Sri Lanka) M Perera | 4 | 5
3 | (Thailand) N Chuaymak | 21 | 21

Second Round
(India) L Pannu | 18 | 21 | 10
(Sweden) M Jansson | 21 | 19 | 21
(Japan) K Sato | 8 | 12
3 | (Thailand) N Chuaymak | 21 | 21

Quarterfinals
(Sweden) M Jansson | 7 | 10
3 | (Thailand) N Chuaymak | 21 | 21

==== Section 4 ====
First Round
(Japan) M Masayuki | 15 | 21
(Switzerland) O Colin | 21 | 21
(Russia) K Mysakishev | 5 | 21
(India) N Kanetkar | 21 | 23
(Germany) H Westermeyer | 21 | 21
(France) J Mevel | 15 | 12

Second Round
(Switzerland) O Colin | 17 | 18
(India) N Kanetkar | 21 | 21
(Germany) H Westermeyer | 11
2 | (Czech Republic) J Frölich | 1^{r}

Quarterfinals
(India) N Kanetkar | 21 | 19 | 21
(Germany) H Westermeyer | 11 | 21 | 10

== Women's singles ==
=== Seeds ===
1. (Japan) Noriko Sanada (semifinals, bronze medal)
2. (Russia) Olga Arkhangelskaya (champion, gold medal)

=== Group A ===
| Rank | Player | Pts | Pld | W | L | SF | SA | PF | PA |
|---|---|---|---|---|---|---|---|---|---|
| 1 | (Japan) Noriko Sanada | 2 | 2 | 2 | 0 | 4 | 0 | 84 | 58 |
| 2 | (Germany) Miriam Mantell | 1 | 2 | 1 | 1 | 2 | 2 | 73 | 66 |
| 3 | (India) Bidisha Baruah | 0 | 2 | 0 | 2 | 0 | 4 | 51 | 84 |

| Date | | Score | | Set 1 | Set 2 | Set 3 |
|---|---|---|---|---|---|---|
| 11 Sep; 11:00 | Noriko Sanada (Japan) | 2–0 | (Germany) Miriam Mantell | 21–15 | 21–16 | |
| 12 Sep; 11:00 | Bidsha Baruah (India) | 0–2 | (Germany) Miriam Mantell | 11–21 | 13–21 | |
| 13 Sep; 15:35 | Noriko Sanada (Japan) | 2–0 | (India) Bidisha Baruah | 21–14 | 21–13 | |

=== Group B ===
| Rank | Player | Pts | Pld | W | L | SF | SA | PF | PA |
|---|---|---|---|---|---|---|---|---|---|
| 1 | (Russia) Maria Koloskova | 2 | 2 | 2 | 0 | 4 | 1 | 103 | 61 |
| 2 | (India) Prerana Joshi | 1 | 2 | 1 | 1 | 3 | 2 | 80 | 92 |
| 3 | (England) Suzannne Brewer | 0 | 2 | 0 | 2 | 0 | 4 | 54 | 84 |
| | (Sri Lanka) Dilhani de Silva | Withdrew | | | | | | | |

| Date | | Score | | Set 1 | Set 2 | Set 3 |
|---|---|---|---|---|---|---|
| 11 Sep; 11:30 | Suzanne Brewer (England) | 0–2 | (Russia) Maria Koloskova | 9–21 | 14–21 | |
| 12 Sep; 11:00 | Prerana Joshi (India) | 1–2 | (Russia) Maria Koloskova | 21–19 | 10–21 | 7–21 |
| 13 Sep; 17:20 | Prerana Joshi (India) | 2–0 | (England) Suzanne Brewer | 21–15 | 21–16 | |

=== Group C ===
| Rank | Player | Pts | Pld | W | L | SF | SA | PF | PA |
|---|---|---|---|---|---|---|---|---|---|
| 1 | (Japan) Rie Matsumoto | 3 | 3 | 3 | 0 | 6 | 1 | 145 | 108 |
| 2 | (India) Swati Tarun Chauhan | 2 | 3 | 2 | 1 | 4 | 2 | 116 | 86 |
| 3 | (France) Karine Barbot | 1 | 3 | 1 | 2 | 3 | 4 | 116 | 133 |
| 4 | (England) Mhairi Armstrong | 0 | 3 | 0 | 3 | 0 | 6 | 76 | 126 |

| Date | | Score | | Set 1 | Set 2 | Set 3 |
|---|---|---|---|---|---|---|
| 11 Sep; 11:30 | Rie Matsumoto (Japan) | 2–0 | (England) Mhairi Armstrong | 21–15 | 21–13 | |
| 11 Sep; 11:30 | Swati Tarun Chauhan (India) | 2–0 | (France) Karine Barbot | 21–14 | 21–12 | |
| 12 Sep; 11:30 | Swati Tarun Chauhan (India) | 2–0 | (England) Mhairi Armstrong | 21–11 | 21–7 | |
| 12 Sep; 11:30 | Rie Matsumoto (Japan) | 2–1 | (France) Karine Barbot | 19–21 | 21–18 | 21–9 |
| 13 Sep; 17:20 | Swati Tarun Chauhan (India) | 0–2 | (Japan) Rie Matsumoto | 16–21 | 16–21 | |
| 13 Sep; 17:20 | Mhairi Armstrong (England) | 0–2 | (France) Karine Barbot | 17–21 | 13–21 | |

=== Group D ===
| Rank | Player | Pts | Pld | W | L | SF | SA | PF | PA |
|---|---|---|---|---|---|---|---|---|---|
| 1 | (Russia) Olga Arkhangelskaya | 2 | 2 | 2 | 0 | 4 | 0 | 84 | 28 |
| 2 | (Japan) Kaoru Takeuchi | 1 | 2 | 1 | 1 | 2 | 3 | 78 | 91 |
| 3 | (India) K. Imlirenla Jamir | 0 | 2 | 0 | 2 | 1 | 4 | 58 | 101 |

| Date | | Score | | Set 1 | Set 2 | Set 3 |
|---|---|---|---|---|---|---|
| 11 Sep; 11:30 | Olga Arkhangelskaya (Russia) | 2–0 | (Japan) Kaori Takeuchi | 21–13 | 21–6 | |
| 12 Sep; 13:00 | K. Imlirenla Jamir (India) | 1–2 | (Japan) Kaoru Takeuchi | 21–17 | 18–21 | 10–21 |
| 13 Sep; 17:20 | Olga Arkhangelskaya (Russia) | 2–0 | (India) K. Imlirenla Jamir | 21–1 | 21–8 | |

=== Finals ===
Quarterfinals
A1 | (Japan) Noriko Sanada | 21 | 21
C2 | (India) Swati Tarun Chauhan | 14 | 17
B1 | (Russia) Maria Koloskova | 21 | 21
D2 | (Japan) Kaoru Takeuchi | 15 | 16
B2 | (India) Prerana Joshi | 14 | 16
C1 | (Japan) Rie Matsumoto | 21 | 21
A2 | (Germany) Miriam Mantell | 5 | 13
D1 | (Russia) Olga Arkhangelskaya | 21 | 21

Semifinals
A1 | (Japan) Noriko Sanada | 20 | 17
B1 | (Russia) Maria Koloskova | 22 | 21
C1 | (Japan) Rie Matsumoto | 12 | 5
D1 | (Russia) Olga Arkhangelskaya | 21 | 21

Final
B1 | (Russia) Maria Koloskova | 16 | 16
D1 | (Russia) Olga Arkhangelskaya | 21 | 21

== Men's doubles ==
=== Seeds ===
1. (India) Rupesh Kumar K. T. / Sanave Thomas (champions, gold medal)
2. (India) J. B. S. Vidyadhar / Valiyaveetil Diju (final, silver medal)
3. (Thailand) Naruenart Chuaymak / Thitipong Lapoe (semifinals, bronze medal)
4. (Japan) Hosemari Fujimoto / Matsumoto Masayuki (semifinals, bronze medal)

=== Finals ===
Semifinals
1 | (India) Rupesh Kumar K. T. (India) Sanave Thomas | 21 | 21
4 | (Japan) Hosemari Fujimoto (Japan) Matsumoto Masayuki | 12 | 9
3 | (Thailand) Naruenart Chuaymak (Thailand) Thitipong Lapoe | 15 | 9
2 | (India) J. B. S. Vidyadhar (India) Valiyaveetil Diju | 21 | 21

Final
1 | (India) Rupesh Kumar K. T. (India) Sanave Thomas | 21 | 17 | 7
2 | (India) J. B. S. Vidyadhar (India) Valiyaveetil Diju | 12 | 21 | 9^{r}

=== Top half ===
==== Section 1 ====
| First Round | Second Round | | | | Quarterfinals |
| | 1 | (India) Rupesh Kumar K. T. (India) S Thomas | 21 | 21 |
| | | (Switzerland) P Gabella (Switzerland) R Lienhard | 7 | 10 |
| | | | | | 1 | (India) Rupesh Kumar K. T. (India) S Thomas | 21 | 21 |
| | | | | | | (Denmark) L Klintrup (Denmark) M E Rasmussen | 16 | 6 |
| | (Russia) A Katkov (Russia) S Pukhov | | 15 | 18 |
| | (Denmark) L Klintrup (Denmark) M E Rasmussen | | 21 | 21 |

==== Section 2 ====
First Round
(India) S Bhagwat (India) J Dhole | 15 | 12
(Germany) F Dietrich (Germany) H Westermeyer | 21 | 21

Second Round
4 | (Japan) H Fujimoto (Japan) M Masayuki | 21 | 21
(France) A Morin (France) P Wolff | 11 | 12
(Sweden) J Bjorka (France) J Mevel | 12 | 9
(Germany) F Dietrich (Germany) H Westermeyer | 21 | 21

Quarterfinals
4 | (Japan) H Fujimoto (Japan) M Masayuki | 21 | 21
(Germany) F Dietrich (Germany) H Westermeyer | 19 | 13

=== Bottom half ===
==== Section 3 ====
First Round
(Switzerland) O Colin (Hungary) K Horvath | w | / | o
(Bangladesh) A U Khan (Bangladesh) N Liton

Second Round
(Switzerland) O Colin (Hungary) K Horvath | 16 | 13
(Germany) F Hoffmann (Germany) Thomas Nirschl | 21 | 21
(India) A K. Shetty (India) S G Varadaraj | 14 | 16
3 | (Thailand) N Chuaymak (Thailand) T Lapoe | 21 | 21

Quarterfinals
(Germany) F Hoffmann (Germany) Thomas Nirschl
3 | (Thailand) N Chuaymak (Thailand) T Lapoe | w | / | o

==== Section 4 ====
First Round
(England) P Freeman (England) R Kapoor | 14 | 12
(Japan) M Okawara (Japan) Kyohei Sato | 21 | 21

Second Round
(Japan) M Okawara (Japan) Kyohei Sato | 21 | 21
(Sweden) M Jansson (Sweden) A Ström | 12 | 11
(England) R Sutoto (Japan) R Tazoe | 11 | 11
2 | (India) J. B. S. Vidyadhar (India) V Diju | 21 | 21

Quarterfinals
(Japan) M Okawara (Japan) Kyohei Sato | 18 | 10
2 | (India) J. B. S. Vidyadhar (India) V Diju | 21 | 21

== Women's doubles ==
=== Seeds ===
1. (Japan) Rie Matsumoto / Noriko Sanada (final, silver medal)
2. (Russia) Olga Arkhangelskaya / Maria Koloskova (champions, gold medal)

=== Group A ===
| Rank | Player | Pts | Pld | W | L | SF | SA | PF | PA |
|---|---|---|---|---|---|---|---|---|---|
| 1 | (Japan) Rie Matsumoto (Japan) Noriko Sanada | 2 | 2 | 2 | 0 | 4 | 0 | 85 | 58 |
| 2 | (Germany) Miriam Mantell (Germany) Claudia Vogelgsang | 1 | 2 | 1 | 1 | 2 | 3 | 95 | 91 |
| 3 | (Sri Lanka) Chandrika de Silva (Uzbekistan) Yana Katerinich | 0 | 2 | 0 | 2 | 1 | 4 | 73 | 104 |
| | (India) Meeta Bhandari (India) Teena Mary Cherian | Retired | | | | | | | |
| | (India) Nirmala Bangalore Prakash (India) Swaroopa Shetehalli Krishna | Withdrew | | | | | | | |

| Date | | Score | | Set 1 | Set 2 | Set 3 |
|---|---|---|---|---|---|---|
| 11 Sep; 14:00 | Rie Matsumoto (Japan); Noriko Sanada (Japan) | 2–0 | (Sri Lanka) Chandrika de Silva (Uzbekistan) Yana Katerinich | 21–13 | 21–12 | |
| 12 Sep; 13:30 | Nirmala Bangalore Prakash (India); Swaroopa Shetehalli Krishna (India) | ~~0–2~~ | (Sri Lanka) Chandrika de Silva (Uzbekistan) Yana Katerinich | ~~11–21~~ | ~~17–21~~ | |
| 12 Sep; 14:00 | Rie Matsumoto (Japan); Noriko Sanada (Japan) | 2–0 | (Germany) Miriam Mantell (Germany) Claudia Vogelgsang | 21–13 | 22–20 | |
| 13 Sep; 12:20 | Rie Matsumoto (Japan); Noriko Sanada (Japan) | ~~2–0~~ | (India) Nirmala Bangalore Prakash (India) Swaroopa Shetehalli Krishna | ~~21–12~~ | ~~21–4~~ | |
| 14 Sep; 12:55 | Miriam Mantell (Germany); Claudia Vogelgsang (Germany) | 2–1 | (Sri Lanka) Chandrika de Silva (Uzbekistan) Yana Katerinich | 21–18 | 22–20 | 21–8 |
| | Nirmala Bangalore Prakash (India); Swaroopa Shetehalli Krishna (India) | w/o | (Germany) Miriam Mantell (Germany) Claudia Vogelgsang | | | |

=== Group B ===
| Rank | Player | Pts | Pld | W | L | SF | SA | PF | PA |
|---|---|---|---|---|---|---|---|---|---|
| 1 | (Russia) Olga Arkhangelskaya (Russia) Maria Koloskova | 4 | 4 | 4 | 0 | 8 | 0 | 168 | 104 |
| 2 | (England) Mhairi Armstrong (England) Suzanne Brewer | 3 | 4 | 3 | 1 | 6 | 3 | 178 | 150 |
| 3 | (France) Karine Barbot (France) Claire Villoin | 2 | 4 | 2 | 2 | 5 | 4 | 159 | 149 |
| 4 | (India) Swati Tarun Chauhan (India) Preeti Kumar | 1 | 4 | 1 | 3 | 2 | 6 | 122 | 153 |
| 5 | (India) Deepa Khare (India) Dipti Sardesai | 0 | 4 | 0 | 4 | 0 | 8 | 97 | 108 |

| Date | | Score | | Set 1 | Set 2 | Set 3 |
|---|---|---|---|---|---|---|
| 11 Sep; 14:00 | Swati Tarun Chauhan (India); Preeti Kumar (India) | 0–2 | (France) Karine Barbot (France) Claire Villoin | 17–21 | 13–21 | |
| 11 Sep; 14:00 | Olga Arkhangelskaya (Russia); Maria Koloskova (Russia) | 2–0 | (England) Mhairi Armstrong (England) Suzanne Brewer | 21–18 | 21–19 | |
| 12 Sep; 14:00 | Olga Arkhangelskaya (Russia); Maria Koloskova (Russia) | 2–0 | (France) Karine Barbot (France) Claire Villoin | 21–11 | 21–7 | |
| 12 Sep; 14:00 | Deepa Khare (India); Dipti Sardesai (India) | 0–2 | (England) Mhairi Armstrong (England) Suzanne Brewer | 13–21 | 13–21 | |
| 13 Sep; 12:20 | Olga Arkhangelskaya (Russia); Maria Koloskova (Russia) | 2–0 | (India) Deepa Khare (India) Dipti Sardesai | 21–15 | 21–9 | |
| 13 Sep; 12:20 | Swati Tarun Chauhan (India); Preeti Kumar (India) | 0–2 | (England) Mhairi Armstrong (England) Suzanne Brewer | 12–21 | 13–21 | |
| 14 Sep; 12:55 | Swati Tarun Chauhan (India); Preeti Kumar (India) | 2–0 | (India) Deepa Khare (India) Dipti Sardesai | 21–14 | 21–13 | |
| 14 Sep; 12:55 | Karine Barbot (France); Claire Villoin (France) | 1–2 | (England) Mhairi Armstrong (England) Suzanne Brewer | 21–15 | 19–21 | 17–21 |
| 15 Sep; 13:20 | Olga Arkhangelskaya (Russia); Maria Koloskova (Russia) | 2–0 | (India) Swati Tarun Chauhan (India) Preeti Kumar | 21–19 | 21–6 | |
| 15 Sep; 13:20 | Deepa Khare (India); Dipti Sardesai (India) | 0–2 | (France) Karine Barbot (France) Claire Villoin | 12–21 | 8–21 | |

=== Finals ===
Semifinals
A1 | (Japan) Rie Matsumoto (Japan) Noriko Sanada | 21 | 21
B2 | (England) Mhairi Armstrong (England) Suzanne Brewer | 15 | 15
A2 | (Germany) Miriam Mantell (Germany) Claudia Vogelgsang | 12 | 12
B1 | (Russia) Olga Arkhangelskaya (Russia) Maria Koloskova | 21 | 21

Final
A1 | (Japan) Rie Matsumoto (Japan) Noriko Sanada | 18 | 10
B1 | (Russia) Olga Arkhangelskaya (Russia) Maria Koloskova | 21 | 21

== Mixed doubles ==
=== Seeds ===
1. (Russia) Alexey Katkov / Olga Arkhangelskaya (second round)
2. (Denmark) Morten Eilby Rasmussen / (England) Lynne Swan (semifinals, bronze medal)
3. (Germany) Felix Hoffman / Claudia Vogelgsang (final, silver medal)
4. (Japan) Matsumoto Masayuki / Rie Matsumoto (second round)

=== Finals ===
Semifinals
(India) Abhinand K. Shetty (India) K. Neelima Choudhary | 9 | 15
3 | (Germany) Felix Hoffmann (Germany) Claudia Vogelgsang | 21 | 21
(Russia) Stanislav Pukhov (Russia) Maria Koloskova | 21 | 21
2 | (Denmark) Morten Eilby Rasmussen (England) Lynne Swan | 13 | 14

Final
3 | (Germany) Felix Hoffmann (Germany) Claudia Vogelgsang | 11 | 12
(Russia) Stanislav Pukhov (Russia) Maria Koloskova | 21 | 21

=== Top half ===
==== Section 1 ====
| First Round | Second Round | | | | | Quarterfinals |
| | 1 | (Russia) A Katkov (Russia) O Arkhangelskaya | 13 | 9 |
| | | (Japan) M Okawara (Japan) N Sanada | 21 | 21 |
| | | | | | | (Japan) M Okawara (Japan) N Sanada | 14 | 16 |
| | | | | | | (India) A K. Shetty (India) K. N Choudhary | 21 | 21 |
| | (India) A K. Shetty (India) K. N Choudhary | | 17 | 21 | 21 |
| | (France) J Mevel (France) K Barbot | | 21 | 17 | 15 |

==== Section 2 ====
First Round
(Japan) K Sato (Japan) K Takeuchi | 24 | 19
(India) S Abbasi (India) P Kumar | 26 | 24

Second Round
3 | (Germany) F Hoffmann (Germany) C Vogelgsang | 21 | 21
(Thailand) N Chuaymak (Sweden) P Wareechol | 14 | 17
(England) R Sutoto (England) S Brewer | 16 | 11
(India) S Abbasi (India) P Kumar | 21 | 21

Quarterfinals
3 | (Germany) F Hoffmann (Germany) C Vogelgsang | 21 | 21
(India) S Abbasi (India) P Kumar | 15 | 12

=== Bottom half ===
==== Section 3 ====
First Round
(India) S Niddodi (India) M Bhandari | 20 | 13
(Germany) H Westermeyer (Germany) M Mantell | 22 | 21

Second Round
(Germany) H Westermeyer (Germany) M Mantell | 21 | 16 | 21
(Thailand) T Lapoe (Austria) V Fastenbauer | 19 | 21 | 19
(Russia) S Pukhov (Russia) M Koloskova | 21 | 21 | 21
4 | (Japan) M Masuayuki (Japan) R Matsumoto | 23 | 13 | 14

Quarterfinals
(Germany) H Westermeyer (Germany) M Mantell | 21 | 11 | 15
(Russia) S Pukhov (Russia) M Koloskova | 17 | 21 | 21

==== Section 4 ====
| First Round | Second Round | | | | | Quarterfinals |
| | (India) S Bhagwat (India) D Rodrigues | | 21 | 21 |
| | (Japan) H Kashiwabara (Japan) S Sasaki | | 17 | 6 |
| | | | | | | | (India) S Bhagwat (India) D Rodrigues | 13 | 19 |
| | | | | | | 2 | (Denmark) M E Rasmussen (England) L Swan | 21 | 21 |
| | | (England) P Freeman (England) M Armstrong | 17 | 21 | 17 |
| | 2 | (Denmark) M E Rasmussen (England) L Swan | 21 | 17 | 21 |
