= Nikhil Kanetkar =

Indian badminton player (born 1979)

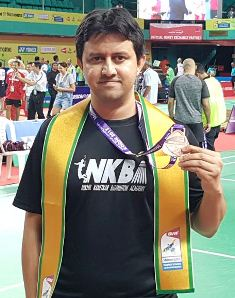
- Nikhil Kanetkar at 2017 BWF World Senior Championships

Personal information
- Born: 13 May 1979 (age 47) Pune, Maharashtra, India
- Height: 1.73 m (5 ft 8 in)

Sport
- Country: India
- Sport: Badminton
- Handedness: Left

Men's singles
- Highest ranking: 33
- BWF profile
Medal record
Men's badminton
Representing India
World Senior Championships
Bronze medal – third place	2017 Kochi	Men's singles +35
Commonwealth Games
Silver medal – second place	1998 Kuala Lumpur	Men's team
South Asian Games
Gold medal – first place	2006 Colombo	Men's team
Silver medal – second place	2006 Colombo	Men's singles

Nikhil Kanetkar (born 13 May 1979) is an Indian former badminton player from Pune.

Born in a Maharashtrian family, Kanetkar played badminton at the 2004 Summer Olympics in men's singles, defeating Sergio Llopis of Spain in the first round. In the round of 16, Kanetkar was defeated by Peter Gade of Denmark. In addition to Olympics, Kanetkar has represented India in the Thomas Cup, All England Open, Asian Games, World Championships, Commonwealth Games, SAF Games, Swiss Open, French Open, Toulouse Open and numerous other championships.

In 2011, he retired from competitive sports and set up Nikhil Kanetkar Badminton Academy (NKBA, www.nkba.in) in Pune, India. The academy is based at Shree Shiv Chhatrapati Sports Complex, Mahalunge-Balewadi, Pune, India. NKBA was established with a vision of "Grooming Talent to Make Champions". Nikhil Kanetkar is currently the Director and Head Coach of NKBA.

Kanetkar is also a columnist and commentator. He wrote for the Marathi newspaper Sakal from Athens during the Olympics and subsequently was invited by StarSports for covering the Badminton events of the 2016 Rio Olympics.

Kanetkar played after 7 years post retirement and won the Men's Singles Title in the 35+ age category in the 41st Indian Masters (Veterans) National Badminton Championships 2016–17 organised by Kerala Badminton Association at Regional Sports Centre, Kadavanthra, Kochi, Kerala. In September 2017, he won the bronze medal in the same age group at the BWF World Senior Badminton Championship held in Kochi, India.

== Achievements ==
=== BWF World Senior Championships ===
Year	Venue	Event	Opponent	Score	Result
2017	Rajiv Gandhi Indoor Stadium, Kochi, India	Men's singles +35	(Thailand) Naruenart Chuaymak	3–8 Retired	Bronze

=== South Asian Games ===
Men's singles
Year	Venue	Opponent	Score	Result
2006	Sugathadasa Indoor Stadium; Colombo, Sri Lanka	(India) Chetan Anand	14–21, 12–21	Silver

=== IBF World Grand Prix ===
The World Badminton Grand Prix was sanctioned by the International Badminton Federation from 1983 to 2006.

Men's singles
Year	Tournament	Opponent	Score	Result
1999	U.S. Open	(England) Colin Haughton	6–15, 0–15	(silver) Runner-up

=== IBF International ===
Men's singles
Year	Tournament	Opponent	Score	Result
2006	India Satellite	(South Korea) Lee Cheol-ho	11–21, 11–21	(silver) Runner-up
2006	Victorian International	(Wales) Richard Vaughan	20–22, 13–21	(silver) Runner-up
2005	South Africa International	(Iran) Kaveh Mehrabi	15–8, 15–7	(gold) Winner
2004	Mauritius International	(India) Abhinn Shyam Gupta	16–17, 8–15	(silver) Runner-up
2003	Le Volant d'Or de Toulouse	(Germany) Andreas Wölk	15–9, 15–11	(gold) Winner
2002	Welsh International	(Indonesia) Irwansyah	6–15, 11–15	(silver) Runner-up
2001	Scottish International	(Indonesia) Irwansyah	5–7, 6–8, 2–7	(silver) Runner-up
1998	Sri Lanka International	(Chinese Taipei) Ting Chih-chen	15–13, 15–6	(gold) Winner

== Sources ==
- Kanetkar, Saina lead D-day challenge
- I choose not to be frustrated: Kanetkar
- Nikhil Kanetkar loses in semis
- task for shuttlers – Aparna Popat, Abhinn Shyam Gupta and Nikhil Kanetkar carry Indian hopes
- Nikhil Kanetkar is runner-up
