= Kamei Arena Sendai =

Indoor sporting arena in Japan

Coordinates: 38.217758°N 140.869085°E

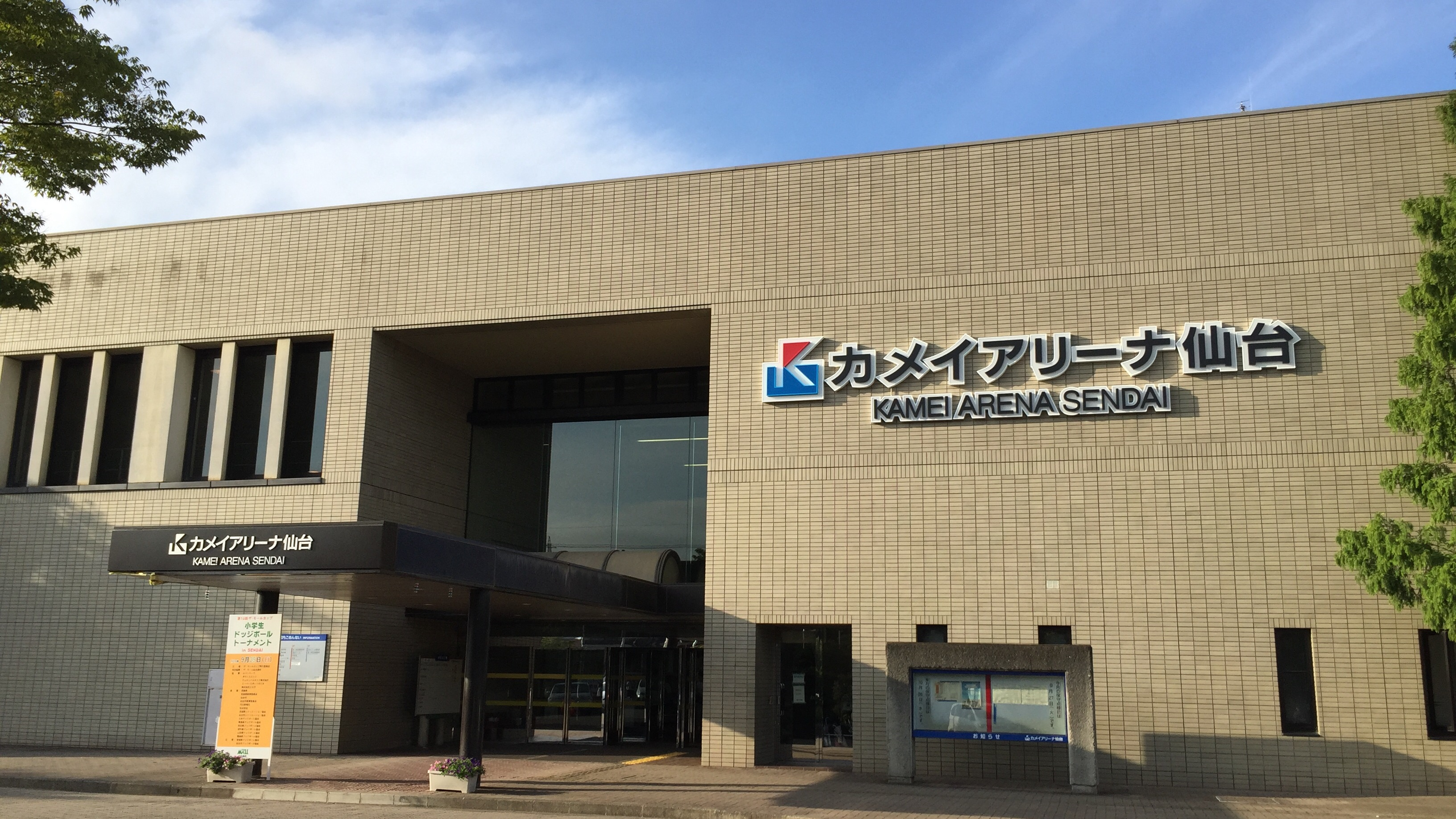

- Location within Miyagi Prefecture Location within Japan
- Interactive map of Kamei Arena Sendai
- Full name: Sendai City Gymnasium
- Location: Sendai, Japan
- Owner: City of Sendai
- Operator: Sendai City Sports Promotion Foundation
- Capacity: 5,705
- Surface: Artificial

Construction
- Opened: 1984

Tenants
- Sendai 89ers (2004–present); Voscuore Sendai (2012-2021)

Website
- www.spf-sendai.jp/scg/

Kamei Arena Sendai (カメイアリーナ仙台, Kamei Arina Sendai) is an indoor sporting arena located in Sendai, Miyagi, Japan. The capacity of the arena is 7,000. It hosted preliminary round games for the Basketball World Championship 2006, and is also the home arena of the Sendai 89ers of the Japan professional basketball B.League. In 1994 and 2004, it hosted the Asian Basketball Championship for Women.

The gymnasium is also the site of international volleyball competitions, and in 2006 hosted the opening rounds of the Thomas Cup and Uber Cup international team badminton tournaments.

The venue is featured during seasons 1, 2, and 3 of the anime series Haikyu!!.

== Access ==
Sendai Gymnasium is located near Tomizawa Station of the Sendai Subway Namboku Line.

== Gallery ==
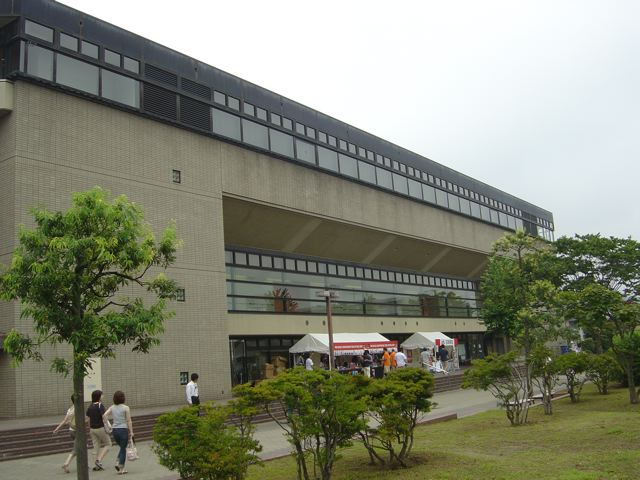

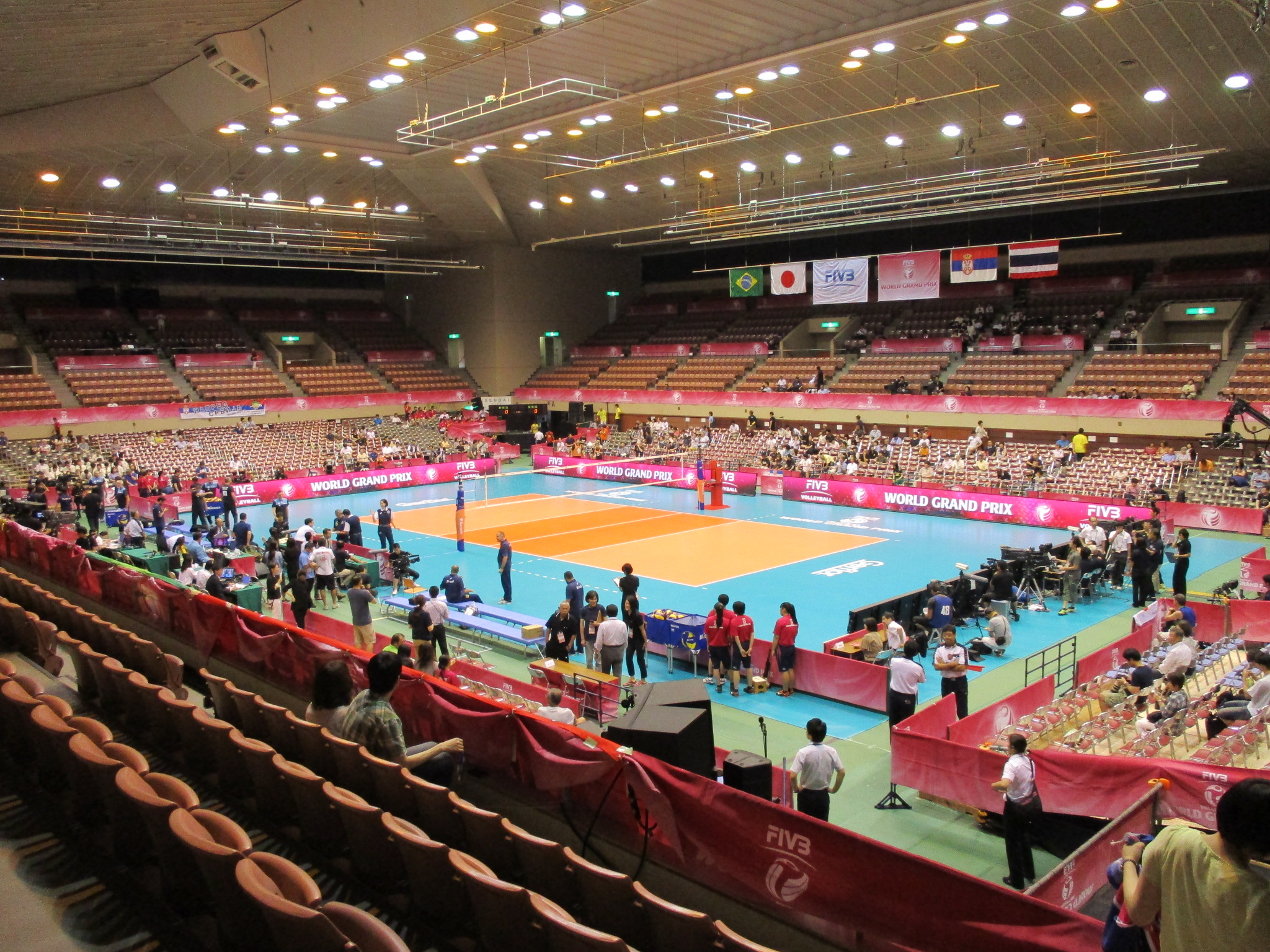

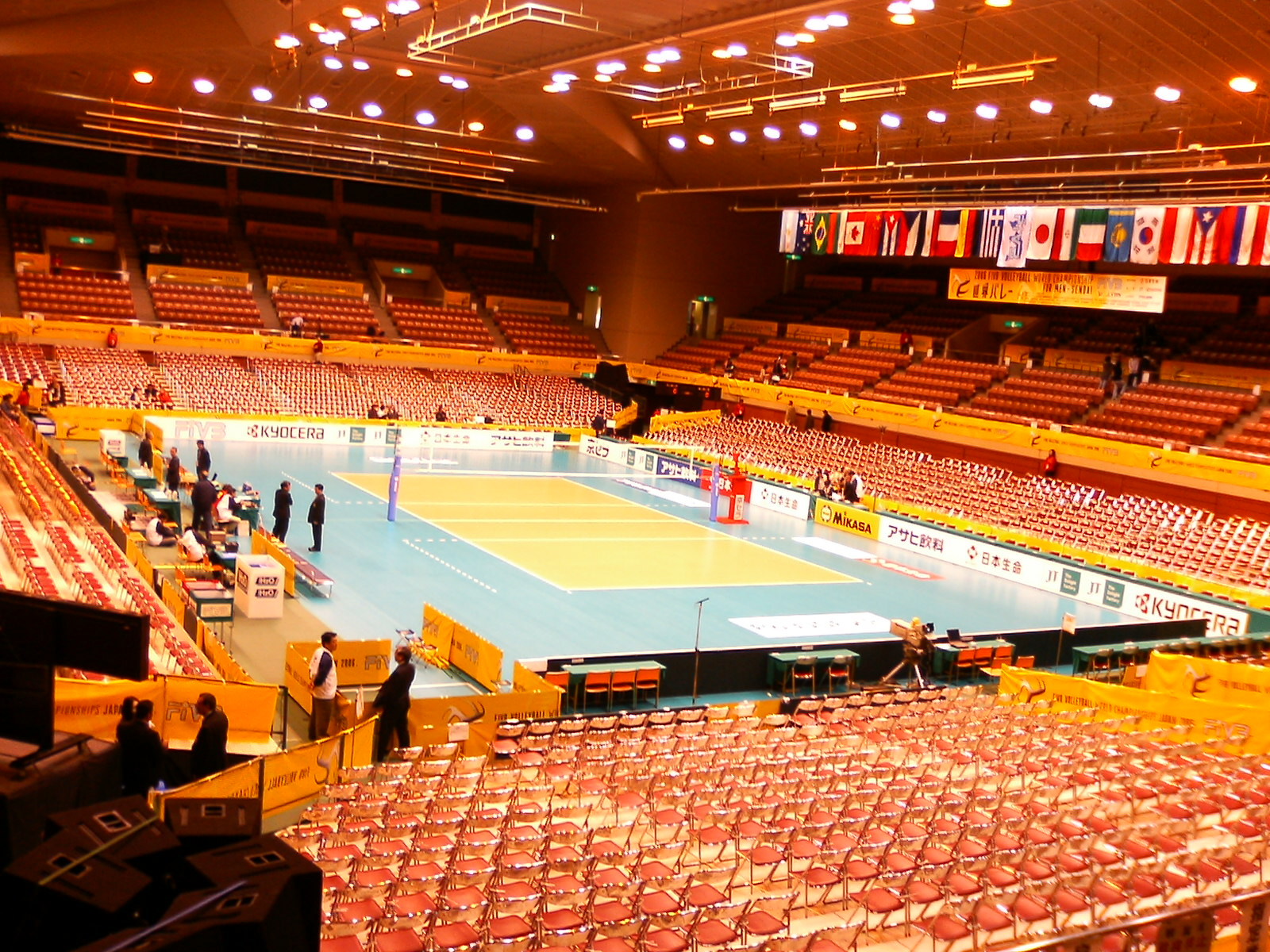

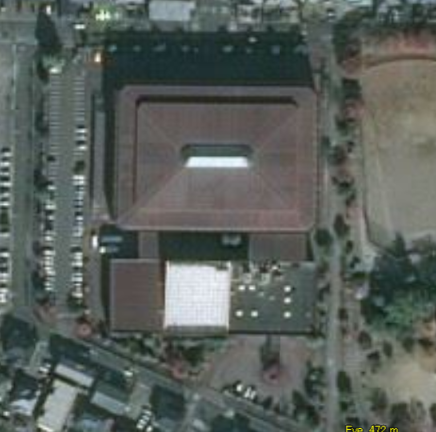
Satellite view
