= 2021 Sudirman Cup knockout stage =

Badminton competition in Finland

The 2021 Sudirman Cup knockout stage was held at the Energia Areena in Vantaa, Finland, from 1 to 3 October 2021.

The knockout stage was the second and final stage of the competition, following the group stage. It began with the quarter-finals (1 October), followed by the semi-finals (2 October), and the final (3 October). The two highest-finished teams in 4 groups (8 teams in total) qualified to the knockout stage.

== Qualified teams ==
Group	Winners	Runners-up
A	China	Thailand
B	South Korea	Chinese Taipei
C	Indonesia	Denmark
D	Japan	Malaysia

== Bracket ==
The draw was held on 30 September 2021, after the Japan against Malaysia tie. The group runners-up were drawn against the group winners. Teams from the same group cannot be drawn against each other.

Quarter-finals
China	3
Denmark	2
South Korea	3
Thailand	2
Malaysia	3
Indonesia	2
Chinese Taipei	1
Japan	3

Semi-finals
China	3
South Korea	0
Malaysia	1
Japan	3

Final
China	3
Japan	1

== Quarter-finals ==
=== Quarter-final 1 ===
China
3
Energia Areena Court 1
1 October 2021, 10:00 UTC+3

Denmark
2

			1	2	3
1	(China) (Denmark)	He Jiting / Zhou Haodong; Anders Skaarup Rasmussen / Frederik Søgaard	21; 17	16; 21	19; 21
2	(China) (Denmark)	Chen Yufei; Mia Blichfeldt	18; 21	21; 8	21; 17
3	(China) (Denmark)	Shi Yuqi; Viktor Axelsen	17; 21	14; 21
4	(China) (Denmark)	Chen Qingchen / Jia Yifan; Maiken Fruergaard / Sara Thygesen	21; 10	21; 13
5	(China) (Denmark)	Wang Yilyu / Huang Dongping; Mathias Christiansen / Alexandra Bøje	21; 18	21; 12

=== Quarter-final 2 ===
South Korea
3
Energia Areena Court 2
1 October 2021, 10:00 UTC+3

Thailand
2

			1	2	3
1	(South Korea) (Thailand)	Kim Won-ho / Kong Hee-yong; Dechapol Puavaranukroh / Sapsiree Taerattanachai	9; 21	17; 21
2	(South Korea) (Thailand)	Heo Kwang-hee; Kunlavut Vitidsarn	21; 16	7; 21	22; 20
3	(South Korea) (Thailand)	An Se-young; Pornpawee Chochuwong	21; 18	21; 3
4	(South Korea) (Thailand)	Choi Sol-gyu / Seo Seung-jae; Supak Jomkoh / Kittinupong Kedren	18; 21	22; 24
5	(South Korea) (Thailand)	Lee So-hee / Shin Seung-chan; Jongkolphan Kititharakul / Sapsiree Taerattanachai	21; 11	17; 21	21; 19

=== Quarter-final 3 ===
Malaysia
3
Energia Areena Court 2
1 October 2021, 16:00 UTC+3

Indonesia
2

			1	2	3
1	(Malaysia) (Indonesia)	Aaron Chia / Soh Wooi Yik; Marcus Fernaldi Gideon / Kevin Sanjaya Sukamuljo	21; 12	21; 15
2	(Malaysia) (Indonesia)	Kisona Selvaduray; Gregoria Mariska Tunjung	20; 22	21; 18	19; 21
3	(Malaysia) (Indonesia)	Lee Zii Jia; Anthony Sinisuka Ginting	21; 11	21; 16
4	(Malaysia) (Indonesia)	Pearly Tan / Thinaah Muralitharan; Greysia Polii / Apriyani Rahayu	20; 22	21; 17	18; 21
5	(Malaysia) (Indonesia)	Hoo Pang Ron / Cheah Yee See; Praveen Jordan / Melati Daeva Oktavianti	21; 19	9; 21	21; 16

=== Quarter-final 4 ===
Chinese Taipei
1
Energia Areena Court 1
1 October 2021, 16:00 UTC+3

Japan
3

			1	2	3
1	(Chinese Taipei) (Japan)	Lee Jhe-huei / Yang Po-hsuan; Akira Koga / Taichi Saito	21; 13	22; 20
2	(Chinese Taipei) (Japan)	Pai Yu-po; Akane Yamaguchi	11; 21	13; 21
3	(Chinese Taipei) (Japan)	Chou Tien-chen; Kento Momota	16; 21	21; 19	17; 21
4	(Chinese Taipei) (Japan)	Hsu Ya-ching / Hu Ling-fang; Mayu Matsumoto / Misaki Matsutomo	17; 21	8; 21
5	(Chinese Taipei) (Japan)	Lu Ching-yao / Chang Ching-hui; Yuta Watanabe / Arisa Higashino				not played

== Semi-finals ==
=== Semi-final 1 ===
China
3
Energia Areena Court 1
2 October 2021, 10:00 UTC+3

South Korea
0

			1	2	3
1	(China) (South Korea)	Wang Yilyu / Huang Dongping; Seo Seung-jae / Shin Seung-chan	21; 14	21; 15
2	(China) (South Korea)	Shi Yuqi; Heo Kwang-hee	17; 21	21; 9	21; 11
3	(China) (South Korea)	Chen Yufei; An Se-young	14; 21	21; 15	21; 15
4	(China) (South Korea)	Liu Cheng / Wang Yilyu; Choi Sol-gyu / Seo Seung-jae				not played
5	(China) (South Korea)	Chen Qingchen / Jia Yifan; Lee So-hee / Shin Seung-chan				not played

=== Semi-final 2 ===
Malaysia
1
Energia Areena Court 1
2 October 2021, 16:00 UTC+3

Japan
3

			1	2	3
1	(Malaysia) (Japan)	Aaron Chia / Soh Wooi Yik; Takuro Hoki / Yugo Kobayashi	15; 21	14; 21
2	(Malaysia) (Japan)	Kisona Selvaduray; Akane Yamaguchi	7; 21	5; 21
3	(Malaysia) (Japan)	Lee Zii Jia; Kento Momota	22; 20	21; 19
4	(Malaysia) (Japan)	Pearly Tan / Thinaah Muralitharan; Mayu Matsumoto / Misaki Matsutomo	19; 21	17; 21
5	(Malaysia) (Japan)	Hoo Pang Ron / Cheah Yee See; Yuta Watanabe / Arisa Higashino				not played

== Final ==
China
3
Energia Areena Court 1
3 October 2021, 13:00 UTC+3

Japan
1

			1	2	3
1	(China) (Japan)	He Jiting / Zhou Haodong; Takuro Hoki / Yugo Kobayashi	21; 17	14; 21	21; 16
2	(China) (Japan)	Chen Yufei; Akane Yamaguchi	19; 21	16; 21
3	(China) (Japan)	Shi Yuqi; Kento Momota	21; 13	8; 21	21; 12
4	(China) (Japan)	Chen Qingchen / Jia Yifan; Mayu Matsumoto / Misaki Matsutomo	21; 17	21; 16
5	(China) (Japan)	Wang Yilyu / Huang Dongping; Yuta Watanabe / Arisa Higashino				not played
