= 2021 Sudirman Cup =

World mixed team badminton championships

Tournament details
- Dates: 26 September – 3 October 2021
- Edition: 17th
- Level: International
- Competitors: 222 from 16 nations
- Venue: Energia Areena
- Location: Vantaa, Finland

The 2021 Sudirman Cup (officially known as the TotalEnergies BWF Sudirman Cup Finals 2021 for sponsorship reasons) was the 17th edition of the Sudirman Cup, the biennial international badminton championship contested by the mixed national teams of the member associations of Badminton World Federation (BWF), since its inception in 1989. The tournament was played in Vantaa, Finland, between 26 September and 3 October 2021. China were the defending champions. They successfully defended their title, lifting the trophy for a record-extending 12th time.

== Host city selection ==
Originally the Badminton World Federation awarded Suzhou, China to host the tournament back in November 2018, but due to the strict restrictions from the ongoing COVID-19 pandemic, it was too hard to conduct tournaments in China in 2021. Thus, on 29 June 2021 BWF announced that Vantaa, Finland would be the new host to stage this tournament.

== Competition format ==
Unlike previous format of Sudirman Cup, only 16 teams will compete in the competition. Teams will be drawn into four groups of four teams. The competition still starts with a group stage followed by a knockout stage.

=== Qualifying ===
Originally, the qualifying process to qualify was through each continental (Asia, Europe, Pan America, Africa, and Oceania) mixed team championships which were planned to take place around February 2021. However, only the European Mixed Team Championships was able to take place due to travel and border restrictions arising from the ongoing COVID-19 pandemic affecting the other planned continental team championships. Therefore, teams from Asia, Pan America, Oceania, and Africa qualified based on the World Rankings.

With the move of host city from Suzhou to Vantaa, it was decided to retain the same qualifying teams as originally qualified in February for the Suzhou hosted tournament which means the quota place for the hosts is temporarily waived. However, if a team withdrew from the competition, the host (Finland) will be invited to participate first.

France and Australia, later on, withdrew from the competition, thus Finland was awarded a quota place as the host. New Zealand was originally to take the place but also declined, in the end, Tahiti was awarded the quota place for Oceania due to their performance at the 2019 Pacific Games.

=== Seeding ===
Teams	Seeds	Notes
China	1	Assigned to position A1
Japan	2	Assigned to position D1
Indonesia	3/4	
Chinese Taipei	3/4	
South Korea	5/8	
Thailand	5/8	
Denmark	5/8	
Malaysia	5/8	
India	9/16	
England	9/16	
Canada	9/16	
Germany	9/16	
(Russia) NBFR	9/16	
Finland	9/16	Host
Egypt	9/16	
Tahiti	9/16	

== Tiebreakers ==
The rankings of teams in each group were determined per BWF Statutes Section 5.1, Article 16.3:

1. Number of ties won;
2. Tie result between the teams in question;
3. Match difference in all group ties;
4. Game difference in all group ties;
5. Point difference in all group ties.

== Group stage ==
All times are Eastern European Summer Time (UTC+3)

=== Group A ===
Pos	Team	Pld	W	L	GF	GA	GD	PF	PA	PD	Pts	Qualification
1	China	3	3	0	27	4	+23	621	380	+241	3	Advance to quarter-finals
2	Thailand	3	2	1	22	9	+13	571	461	+110	2	Advance to quarter-finals
3	India	3	1	2	10	21	−11	492	580	−88	1	
4	Finland (H)	3	0	3	3	28	−25	380	643	−263	0	

Source: TournamentSoftware.com
Rules for classification: Tiebreakers
(H) Host

26 September 2021
10:00

China	5–0	Finland
Report

Energia Areena Court 1, Vantaa

26 September 2021
10:00

Thailand	4–1	India
Report

Energia Areena Court 2, Vantaa

27 September 2021
10:00

China	5–0	India
Report

Energia Areena Court 1, Vantaa

27 September 2021
16:00

Thailand	5–0	Finland
Report

Energia Areena Court 1, Vantaa

29 September 2021
16:00

India	4–1	Finland
Report

Energia Areena Court 1, Vantaa

29 September 2021
16:00

China	3–2	Thailand
Report

Energia Areena Court 2, Vantaa

=== Group B ===
Pos	Team	Pld	W	L	GF	GA	GD	PF	PA	PD	Pts	Qualification
1	South Korea	3	3	0	28	5	+23	672	422	+250	3	Advance to quarter-finals
2	Chinese Taipei	3	2	1	22	13	+9	666	502	+164	2	Advance to quarter-finals
3	Germany	3	1	2	16	18	−2	612	565	+47	1	
4	Tahiti	3	0	3	0	30	−30	169	630	−461	0	

Source: TournamentSoftware.com
Rules for classification: Tiebreakers

26 September 2021
10:00

Chinese Taipei	5–0	Tahiti
Report

Energia Areena Court 3, Vantaa

26 September 2021
16:00

South Korea	4–1	Germany
Report

Energia Areena Court 1, Vantaa

28 September 2021
10:00

Chinese Taipei	5–0	Germany
Report

Energia Areena Court 1, Vantaa

28 September 2021
10:00

South Korea	5–0	Tahiti
Report

Energia Areena Court 2, Vantaa

30 September 2021
10:00

Chinese Taipei	0–5	South Korea
Report

Energia Areena Court 1, Vantaa

30 September 2021
10:00

Germany	5–0	Tahiti
Report

Energia Areena Court 2, Vantaa

=== Group C ===
Pos	Team	Pld	W	L	GF	GA	GD	PF	PA	PD	Pts	Qualification
1	Indonesia	3	3	0	25	8	+17	647	523	+124	3	Advance to quarter-finals
2	Denmark	3	2	1	23	10	+13	625	533	+92	2	Advance to quarter-finals
3	(Russia) NBFR	3	1	2	13	20	−7	574	611	−37	1	
4	Canada	3	0	3	5	28	−23	491	670	−179	0	

Source: TournamentSoftware.com
Rules for classification: Tiebreakers

26 September 2021
16:00

Indonesia	5–0	(Russia) NBFR
Report

Energia Areena Court 2, Vantaa

26 September 2021
16:00

Denmark	5–0	Canada
Report

Energia Areena Court 3, Vantaa

27 September 2021
16:00

Denmark	4–1	(Russia) NBFR
Report

Energia Areena Court 2, Vantaa

27 September 2021
16:00

Indonesia	3–2	Canada
Report

Energia Areena Court 3, Vantaa

29 September 2021
10:00

Indonesia	3–2	Denmark
Report

Energia Areena Court 1, Vantaa

29 September 2021
10:00

Canada	0–5	(Russia) NBFR
Report

Energia Areena Court 2, Vantaa

=== Group D ===
Pos	Team	Pld	W	L	GF	GA	GD	PF	PA	PD	Pts	Qualification
1	Japan	3	3	0	29	3	+26	665	383	+282	3	Advance to quarter-finals
2	Malaysia	3	2	1	19	13	+6	593	482	+111	2	Advance to quarter-finals
3	England	3	1	2	15	17	−2	570	527	+43	1	
4	Egypt	3	0	3	0	30	−30	194	630	−436	0	

Source: TournamentSoftware.com
Rules for classification: Tiebreakers

27 September 2021
10:00

Malaysia	3–2	England
Report

Energia Areena Court 2, Vantaa

27 September 2021
10:00

Japan	5–0	Egypt
Report

Energia Areena Court 3, Vantaa

28 September 2021
16:00

Japan	5–0	England
Report

Energia Areena Court 1, Vantaa

28 September 2021
16:00

Malaysia	5–0	Egypt
Report

Energia Areena Court 2, Vantaa

30 September 2021
16:00

Japan	4–1	Malaysia
Report

Energia Areena Court 1, Vantaa

30 September 2021
16:00

England	5–0	Egypt
Report

Energia Areena Court 2, Vantaa

== Knockout stage ==
=== Bracket ===
The draw was held on 30 September 2021, after the Japan against Malaysia tie. The group runners-up were drawn against the group winners. Teams from the same group cannot be drawn against each other.

Quarter-finals
China	3
Denmark	2
South Korea	3
Thailand	2
Malaysia	3
Indonesia	2
Chinese Taipei	1
Japan	3

Semi-finals
China	3
South Korea	0
Malaysia	1
Japan	3

Final
China	3
Japan	1

=== Quarter-finals ===
1 October 2021
10:00

China	3–2	Denmark
Report

Energia Areena Court 1, Vantaa

1 October 2021
10:00

South Korea	3–2	Thailand
Report

Energia Areena Court 2, Vantaa

1 October 2021
16:00

Malaysia	3–2	Indonesia
Report

Energia Areena Court 2, Vantaa

1 October 2021
16:00

Chinese Taipei	1–3	Japan
Report

Energia Areena Court 1, Vantaa

=== Semi-finals ===
2 October 2021
10:00

China	3–0	South Korea
Report

Energia Areena Court 1, Vantaa

2 October 2021
16:00

Malaysia	1–3	Japan
Report

Energia Areena Court 1, Vantaa

=== Final ===
3 October 2021
13:00

China	3–1	Japan
Report

Energia Areena Court 1, Vantaa

2021 Sudirman Cup champions

China
12th title

== Final ranking ==
Pos	Team	Pld	W	L	Pts	MD	GD	PD	Final result
1st place, gold medalist(s)	China	6	6	0	6	+17	+31	+316	Champions
2nd place, silver medalist(s)	Japan	6	5	1	5	+15	+31	+351	Runners-up
3rd place, bronze medalist(s)	South Korea	5	4	1	4	+11	+19	+215	Eliminated in semi-finals
3rd place, bronze medalist(s)	Malaysia	5	3	2	3	+2	+5	+89	Eliminated in semi-finals
5	Indonesia	4	3	1	3	+6	+14	+101	Eliminated in quarter-finals
6	Thailand	4	2	2	2	+6	+13	+109	Eliminated in quarter-finals
7	Denmark	4	2	2	2	+6	+11	+61	Eliminated in quarter-finals
8	Chinese Taipei	4	2	2	2	+3	+6	+132	Eliminated in quarter-finals
9	England	3	1	2	1	−1	−2	+43	Eliminated in group stage
10	Germany	3	1	2	1	−3	−2	+47	Eliminated in group stage
11	(Russia) NBFR	3	1	2	1	−3	−7	−37	Eliminated in group stage
12	India	3	1	2	1	−5	−11	−88	Eliminated in group stage
13	Canada	3	0	3	0	−11	−23	−179	Eliminated in group stage
14	Finland (H)	3	0	3	0	−13	−25	−263	Eliminated in group stage
15	Egypt	3	0	3	0	−15	−30	−436	Eliminated in group stage
16	Tahiti	3	0	3	0	−15	−30	−461	Eliminated in group stage
