= 2021 Sudirman Cup group stage =

Badminton championship in Finland

The 2021 Sudirman Cup group stage was held at the Energia Areena in Vantaa, Finland, from 26 to 30 September 2021.

The group stage was the first stage of the 2021 Sudirman Cup. During the group stage, only the 2 highest-placing teams in all 4 groups advanced to the knockout stage.

== Seeding ==
The seedings for the 16 teams were released by BWF around June 2021. France and Australia originally were among the 16 teams but later on, withdrew from the competition. Thus, Finland was awarded a place as the host. New Zealand who originally have been given a place to replace Australia later on declined. In the end, French Polynesia was awarded the place for Oceania, replacing Australia, due to their performance at the 2019 Pacific Games.

| Teams | Seeds | Notes |
|---|---|---|
| China | 1 | Assigned to position A1 |
| Japan | 2 | Assigned to position D1 |
| Indonesia | 3/4 | |
| Chinese Taipei | 3/4 | |
| South Korea | 5/8 | |
| Thailand | 5/8 | |
| Denmark | 5/8 | |
| Malaysia | 5/8 | |
| India | 9/16 | |
| England | 9/16 | |
| Canada | 9/16 | |
| Germany | 9/16 | |
| NBFR | 9/16 | |
| Finland | 9/16 | Host |
| Egypt | 9/16 | |
| Tahiti | 9/16 | |

=== Group composition ===
Group
| Group A | Group B | Group C | Group D |
|---|---|---|---|
| China; Thailand; Finland (Host); India | Chinese Taipei; South Korea; Tahiti; Germany | Indonesia; Denmark; NBFR; Canada | Japan; Malaysia; Egypt; England |

== Group A ==
| Pos | Team | Pld | W | L | GF | GA | GD | PF | PA | PD | Pts | Qualification |
|---|---|---|---|---|---|---|---|---|---|---|---|---|
| 1 | China | 3 | 3 | 0 | 27 | 4 | +23 | 621 | 380 | +241 | 3 | Advance to quarter-finals |
| 2 | Thailand | 3 | 2 | 1 | 22 | 9 | +13 | 571 | 461 | +110 | 2 | Advance to quarter-finals |
| 3 | India | 3 | 1 | 2 | 10 | 21 | −11 | 492 | 580 | −88 | 1 | |
| 4 | Finland (H) | 3 | 0 | 3 | 3 | 28 | −25 | 380 | 643 | −263 | 0 | |

Source: TournamentSoftware.com
Rules for classification: Tiebreakers
(H) Host

=== China vs Finland ===
China
5
Energia Areena Court 1
26 September 2021, 10:00 UTC+3

Finland
0

| | | | 1 | 2 | 3 |
|---|---|---|---|---|---|
| 1 | (China) (Finland) | Wang Yilyu / Huang Dongping; Anton Kaisti / Jenny Nyström | 21; 3 | 21; 9 |
| 2 | (China) (Finland) | Lu Guangzu; Kalle Koljonen | 21; 16 | 21; 19 |
| 3 | (China) (Finland) | He Bingjiao; Nella Siilasmaa | 21; 10 | 21; 6 |
| 4 | (China) (Finland) | He Jiting / Tan Qiang; Anton Kaisti / Jesper Paul | 21; 4 | 21; 14 |
| 5 | (China) (Finland) | Chen Qingchen / Jia Yifan; Mathilda Lindholm / Jenny Nyström | 21; 11 | 21; 11 |

=== Thailand vs India ===
Thailand
4
Energia Areena Court 2
26 September 2021, 10:00 UTC+3

India
1

| | | | 1 | 2 | 3 |
|---|---|---|---|---|---|
| 1 | (Thailand) (India) | Supak Jomkoh / Kittinupong Kedren; Arjun M.R. / Dhruv Kapila | 18; 21 | 17; 21 |
| 2 | (Thailand) (India) | Pornpawee Chochuwong; Malvika Bansod | 21; 11 | 21; 14 |
| 3 | (Thailand) (India) | Kunlavut Vitidsarn; Srikanth Kidambi | 21; 9 | 21; 19 |
| 4 | (Thailand) (India) | Jongkolphan Kititharakul / Rawinda Prajongjai; Ashwini Ponnappa / N. Sikki Reddy | 23; 21 | 21; 8 |
| 5 | (Thailand) (India) | Dechapol Puavaranukroh / Sapsiree Taerattanachai; B. Sai Praneeth / Tanisha Crasto | 21; 13 | 21; 11 |

=== China vs India ===
China
5
Energia Areena Court 1
27 September 2021, 10:00 UTC+3

India
0

| | | | 1 | 2 | 3 |
|---|---|---|---|---|---|
| 1 | (China) (India) | Liu Cheng / Zhou Haodong; Arjun M.R. / Dhruv Kapila | 22; 20 | 21; 17 |
| 2 | (China) (India) | Chen Yufei; Aditi Bhatt | 21; 9 | 21; 8 |
| 3 | (China) (India) | Shi Yuqi; B. Sai Praneeth | 21; 10 | 21; 10 |
| 4 | (China) (India) | Li Wenmei / Zheng Yu; Ashwini Ponnappa / N. Sikki Reddy | 21; 16 | 21; 13 |
| 5 | (China) (India) | Feng Yanzhe / Du Yue; Srikanth Kidambi / Rutaparna Panda | 21; 9 | 21; 9 |

=== Thailand vs Finland ===
Thailand
5
Energia Areena Court 1
27 September 2021, 16:00 UTC+3

Finland
0

| | | | 1 | 2 | 3 |
|---|---|---|---|---|---|
| 1 | (Thailand) (Finland) | Supak Jomkoh / Supissara Paewsampran; Anton Kaisti / Jenny Nyström | 21; 15 | 21; 14 |
| 2 | (Thailand) (Finland) | Kantaphon Wangcharoen; Joakim Oldorff | 21; 14 | 21; 14 |
| 3 | (Thailand) (Finland) | Phittayaporn Chaiwan; Nella Nyqvist | 21; 6 | 21; 6 |
| 4 | (Thailand) (Finland) | Natthapat Trinkajee / Tanupat Viriyangkura; Anton Kaisti / Jesper Paul | 21; 15 | 21; 12 |
| 5 | (Thailand) (Finland) | Puttita Supajirakul / Sapsiree Taerattanachai; Mathilda Lindholm / Jenny Nyström | 21; 10 | 21; 7 |

=== India vs Finland ===
India
4
Energia Areena Court 1
29 September 2021, 16:00 UTC+3

Finland
1

| | | | 1 | 2 | 3 |
|---|---|---|---|---|---|
| 1 | (India) (Finland) | Arjun M.R. / Ashwini Ponnappa; Anton Kaisti / Jenny Nyström | 21; 9 | 21; 14 |
| 2 | (India) (Finland) | Srikanth Kidambi; Kalle Koljonen | 16; 21 | 21; 14 | 21; 11 |
| 3 | (India) (Finland) | Malvika Bansod; Nella Nyqvist | 21; 16 | 21; 11 |
| 4 | (India) (Finland) | Arjun M.R. / Dhruv Kapila; Anton Kaisti / Jesper Paul | 20; 22 | 19; 21 |
| 5 | (India) (Finland) | Tanisha Crasto / Rutaparna Panda; Mathilda Lindholm / Jenny Nyström | 21; 12 | 21; 13 |

=== China vs Thailand ===
China
3
Energia Areena Court 2
29 September 2021, 16:00 UTC+3

Thailand
2

| | | | 1 | 2 | 3 |
|---|---|---|---|---|---|
| 1 | (China) (Thailand) | He Jiting / Tan Qiang; Supak Jomkoh / Kittinupong Kedren | 21; 11 | 8; 21 | 11; 21 |
| 2 | (China) (Thailand) | Chen Yufei; Busanan Ongbamrungphan | 21; 12 | 21; 10 |
| 3 | (China) (Thailand) | Shi Yuqi; Kunlavut Vitidsarn | 17; 21 | 17; 21 |
| 4 | (China) (Thailand) | Chen Qingchen / Jia Yifan; Jongkolphan Kititharakul / Rawinda Prajongjai | 21; 4 | 21; 12 |
| 5 | (China) (Thailand) | Wang Yilyu / Huang Dongping; Dechapol Puavaranukroh / Sapsiree Taerattanachai | 21; 8 | 21; 15 |

== Group B ==
| Pos | Team | Pld | W | L | GF | GA | GD | PF | PA | PD | Pts | Qualification |
|---|---|---|---|---|---|---|---|---|---|---|---|---|
| 1 | South Korea | 3 | 3 | 0 | 28 | 5 | +23 | 672 | 422 | +250 | 3 | Advance to quarter-finals |
| 2 | Chinese Taipei | 3 | 2 | 1 | 22 | 13 | +9 | 666 | 502 | +164 | 2 | Advance to quarter-finals |
| 3 | Germany | 3 | 1 | 2 | 16 | 18 | −2 | 612 | 565 | +47 | 1 | |
| 4 | Tahiti | 3 | 0 | 3 | 0 | 30 | −30 | 169 | 630 | −461 | 0 | |

Source: TournamentSoftware.com
Rules for classification: Tiebreakers

=== Chinese Taipei vs Tahiti ===
Chinese Taipei
5
Energia Areena Court 3
26 September 2021, 10:00 UTC+3

Tahiti
0

| | | | 1 | 2 | 3 |
|---|---|---|---|---|---|
| 1 | (Chinese Taipei) (French Polynesia) | Lee Jhe-huei / Hsu Ya-ching; Glen Lefoll / Chloé Segrestan | 21; 4 | 21; 7 |
| 2 | (Chinese Taipei) (French Polynesia) | Chi Yu-jen; Elias Maublanc | 21; 5 | 21; 3 |
| 3 | (Chinese Taipei) (French Polynesia) | Yu Chien-hui; Jenica Lesourd | 21; 4 | 21; 4 |
| 4 | (Chinese Taipei) (French Polynesia) | Lu Ching-yao / Yang Po-han; Glen Lefoll / Heiva Yvonet | 21; 1 | 21; 3 |
| 5 | (Chinese Taipei) (French Polynesia) | Hsu Ya-ching / Hu Ling-fang; Heirautea Curet / Maeva Gaillard | 21; 3 | 21; 3 |

=== South Korea vs Germany ===
South Korea
4
Energia Areena Court 1
26 September 2021, 16:00 UTC+3

Germany
1

| | | | 1 | 2 | 3 |
|---|---|---|---|---|---|
| 1 | (South Korea) (Germany) | Kim Won-ho / Shin Seung-chan; Mark Lamsfuß / Isabel Lohau | 20; 22 | 18; 21 |
| 2 | (South Korea) (Germany) | Heo Kwang-hee; Max Weißkirchen | 21; 12 | 13; 21 | 21; 19 |
| 3 | (South Korea) (Germany) | An Se-young; Yvonne Li | 21; 4 | 21; 11 |
| 4 | (South Korea) (Germany) | Choi Sol-gyu / Seo Seung-jae; Mark Lamsfuß / Marvin Seidel | 23; 21 | 21; 19 |
| 5 | (South Korea) (Germany) | Kim So-yeong / Kong Hee-yong; Linda Efler / Isabel Lohau | 21; 11 | 21; 17 |

=== Chinese Taipei vs Germany ===
Chinese Taipei
5
Energia Areena Court 1
28 September 2021, 10:00 UTC+3

Germany
0

| | | | 1 | 2 | 3 |
|---|---|---|---|---|---|
| 1 | (Chinese Taipei) (Germany) | Lee Jhe-huei / Hsu Ya-ching; Jan Colin Völker / Linda Efler | 25; 23 | 11; 21 | 21; 17 |
| 2 | (Chinese Taipei) (Germany) | Chou Tien-chen; Fabian Roth | 21; 14 | 17; 21 | 21; 9 |
| 3 | (Chinese Taipei) (Germany) | Pai Yu-po; Yvonne Li | 17; 21 | 21; 16 | 21; 19 |
| 4 | (Chinese Taipei) (Germany) | Lee Jhe-huei / Yang Po-hsuan; Mark Lamsfuß / Marvin Seidel | 21; 18 | 21; 10 |
| 5 | (Chinese Taipei) (Germany) | Hsu Ya-ching / Hu Ling-fang; Stine Küspert / Emma Moszczyński | 21; 13 | 24; 22 |

=== South Korea vs Tahiti ===
South Korea
5
Energia Areena Court 2
28 September 2021, 10:00 UTC+3

Tahiti
0

| | | | 1 | 2 | 3 |
|---|---|---|---|---|---|
| 1 | (South Korea) (French Polynesia) | Jeon Hyeok-jin; Heiva Yvonet | 21; 1 | 21; 3 |
| 2 | (South Korea) (French Polynesia) | Kim Ga-eun; Heirautea Curet | 21; 5 | 21; 2 |
| 3 | (South Korea) (French Polynesia) | Kang Min-hyuk / Kim Won-ho; Elias Maublanc / Heiva Yvonet | 21; 3 | 21; 7 |
| 4 | (South Korea) (French Polynesia) | Lee So-hee / Shin Seung-chan; Maeva Gaillard / Jenica Lesourd | 21; 8 | 21; 9 |
| 5 | (South Korea) (French Polynesia) | Seo Seung-jae / Kim So-yeong; Glen Lefoll / Chloé Segrestan | 21; 5 | 21; 7 |

=== Chinese Taipei vs South Korea ===
Chinese Taipei
0
Energia Areena Court 1
30 September 2021, 10:00 UTC+3

South Korea
5

| | | | 1 | 2 | 3 |
|---|---|---|---|---|---|
| 1 | (Chinese Taipei) (South Korea) | Lu Ching-yao / Yang Po-han; Choi Sol-gyu / Seo Seung-jae | 21; 14 | 20; 22 | 17; 21 |
| 2 | (Chinese Taipei) (South Korea) | Yu Chien-hui; An Se-young | 12; 21 | 17; 21 |
| 3 | (Chinese Taipei) (South Korea) | Chou Tien-chen; Heo Kwang-hee | 21; 15 | 11; 21 | 17; 21 |
| 4 | (Chinese Taipei) (South Korea) | Chang Ching-hui / Lee Chih-chen; Kong Hee-yong / Lee So-hee | 9; 21 | 16; 21 |
| 5 | (Chinese Taipei) (South Korea) | Yang Po-hsuan / Hu Ling-fang; Seo Seung-jae / Shin Seung-chan | 20; 22 | 13; 21 |

=== Germany vs Tahiti ===
Germany
5
Energia Areena Court 2
30 September 2021, 10:00 UTC+3

Tahiti
0

| | | | 1 | 2 | 3 |
|---|---|---|---|---|---|
| 1 | (Germany) (French Polynesia) | Daniel Hess / Jones Ralfy Jansen; Elias Maublanc / Heiva Yvonet | 21; 6 | 21; 9 |
| 2 | (Germany) (French Polynesia) | Ann-Kathrin Spöri; Chloé Segrestan | 21; 17 | 21; 8 |
| 3 | (Germany) (French Polynesia) | Max Weißkirchen; Glen Lefoll | 21; 6 | 21; 8 |
| 4 | (Germany) (French Polynesia) | Stine Küspert / Emma Moszczyński; Heirautea Curet / Jenica Lesourd | 21; 12 | 21; 5 |
| 5 | (Germany) (French Polynesia) | Jan Colin Völker / Linda Efler; Elias Maublanc / Maeva Gaillard | 21; 3 | 21; 8 |

== Group C ==
| Pos | Team | Pld | W | L | GF | GA | GD | PF | PA | PD | Pts | Qualification |
|---|---|---|---|---|---|---|---|---|---|---|---|---|
| 1 | Indonesia | 3 | 3 | 0 | 25 | 8 | +17 | 647 | 523 | +124 | 3 | Advance to quarter-finals |
| 2 | Denmark | 3 | 2 | 1 | 23 | 10 | +13 | 625 | 533 | +92 | 2 | Advance to quarter-finals |
| 3 | (Russia) NBFR | 3 | 1 | 2 | 13 | 20 | −7 | 574 | 611 | −37 | 1 | |
| 4 | Canada | 3 | 0 | 3 | 5 | 28 | −23 | 491 | 670 | −179 | 0 | |

Source: TournamentSoftware.com
Rules for classification: Tiebreakers

=== Indonesia vs NBFR ===
Indonesia
5
Energia Areena Court 2
26 September 2021, 16:00 UTC+3

NBFR
0

| | | | 1 | 2 | 3 |
|---|---|---|---|---|---|
| 1 | (Indonesia) (Russia) | Anthony Sinisuka Ginting; Ivan Sozonov | 21; 8 | 21; 8 |
| 2 | (Indonesia) (Russia) | Gregoria Mariska Tunjung; Anastasiia Shapovalova | 21; 14 | 21; 13 |
| 3 | (Indonesia) (Russia) | Marcus Fernaldi Gideon / Kevin Sanjaya Sukamuljo; Vladimir Ivanov / Ivan Sozonov | 21; 17 | 21; 18 |
| 4 | (Indonesia) (Russia) | Siti Fadia Silva Ramadhanti / Ribka Sugiarto; Evgeniya Kosetskaya / Ekaterina Malkova | 21; 13 | 21; 15 |
| 5 | (Indonesia) (Russia) | Praveen Jordan / Melati Daeva Oktavianti; Rodion Alimov / Alina Davletova | 21; 15 | 27; 25 |

=== Denmark vs Canada ===
Denmark
5
Energia Areena Court 3
26 September 2021, 16:00 UTC+3

Canada
0

| | | | 1 | 2 | 3 |
|---|---|---|---|---|---|
| 1 | (Denmark) (Canada) | Niclas Nøhr / Amalie Magelund; Nyl Yakura / Crystal Lai | 21; 9 | 21; 4 |
| 2 | (Denmark) (Canada) | Anders Antonsen; Brian Yang | 21; 18 | 21; 19 |
| 3 | (Denmark) (Canada) | Line Christophersen; Rachel Chan | 21; 13 | 21; 17 |
| 4 | (Denmark) (Canada) | Mads Pieler Kolding / Frederik Søgaard; B. R. Sankeerth / Nyl Yakura | 21; 15 | 21; 10 |
| 5 | (Denmark) (Canada) | Amalie Magelund / Freja Ravn; Catherine Choi / Crystal Lai | 21; 16 | 21; 13 |

=== Denmark vs NBFR ===
Denmark
4
Energia Areena Court 2
27 September 2021, 16:00 UTC+3

NBFR
1

| | | | 1 | 2 | 3 |
|---|---|---|---|---|---|
| 1 | (Denmark) (Russia) | Mathias Christiansen / Alexandra Bøje; Rodion Alimov / Alina Davletova | 21; 18 | 16; 21 | 11; 21 |
| 2 | (Denmark) (Russia) | Viktor Axelsen; Vladimir Malkov | 21; 11 | 21; 12 |
| 3 | (Denmark) (Russia) | Anders Skaarup Rasmussen / Frederik Søgaard; Vladimir Ivanov / Ivan Sozonov | 24; 22 | 21; 16 |
| 4 | (Denmark) (Russia) | Mia Blichfeldt; Evgeniya Kosetskaya | 21; 16 | 11; 21 | 21; 18 |
| 5 | (Denmark) (Russia) | Maiken Fruergaard / Sara Thygesen; Alina Davletova / Ekaterina Malkova | 21; 13 | 21; 14 |

=== Indonesia vs Canada ===
Indonesia
3
Energia Areena Court 3
27 September 2021, 16:00 UTC+3

Canada
2

| | | | 1 | 2 | 3 |
|---|---|---|---|---|---|
| 1 | (Indonesia) (Canada) | Fajar Alfian / Muhammad Rian Ardianto; B. R. Sankeerth / Nyl Yakura | 21; 16 | 21; 10 |
| 2 | (Indonesia) (Canada) | Ester Nurumi Tri Wardoyo; Rachel Chan | 24; 22 | 8; 21 | 18; 21 |
| 3 | (Indonesia) (Canada) | Jonatan Christie; Brian Yang | 21; 9 | 20; 22 | 18; 21 |
| 4 | (Indonesia) (Canada) | Greysia Polii / Apriyani Rahayu; Rachel Chan / Catherine Choi | 21; 16 | 21; 10 |
| 5 | (Indonesia) (Canada) | Rinov Rivaldy / Pitha Haningtyas Mentari; B. R. Sankeerth / Crystal Lai | 21; 14 | 21; 10 |

=== Indonesia vs Denmark ===
Indonesia
3
Energia Areena Court 1
29 September 2021, 10:00 UTC+3

Denmark
2

| | | | 1 | 2 | 3 |
|---|---|---|---|---|---|
| 1 | (Indonesia) (Denmark) | Marcus Fernaldi Gideon / Kevin Sanjaya Sukamuljo; Mads Pieler Kolding / Frederik Søgaard | 21; 19 | 21; 15 |
| 2 | (Indonesia) (Denmark) | Putri Kusuma Wardani; Mia Blichfeldt | 11; 21 | 21; 16 | 14; 21 |
| 3 | (Indonesia) (Denmark) | Anthony Sinisuka Ginting; Anders Antonsen | 9; 21 | 15; 21 |
| 4 | (Indonesia) (Denmark) | Greysia Polii / Apriyani Rahayu; Maiken Fruergaard / Sara Thygesen | 21; 17 | 21; 9 |
| 5 | (Indonesia) (Denmark) | Praveen Jordan / Melati Daeva Oktavianti; Mathias Thyrri / Amalie Magelund | 21; 8 | 21; 17 |

=== Canada vs NBFR ===
Canada
0
Energia Areena Court 2
29 September 2021, 10:00 UTC+3

NBFR
5

| | | | 1 | 2 | 3 |
|---|---|---|---|---|---|
| 1 | (Canada) (Russia) | Nyl Yakura / Crystal Lai; Rodion Alimov / Alina Davletova | 14; 21 | 11; 21 |
| 2 | (Canada) (Russia) | B. R. Sankeerth; Vladimir Malkov | 19; 21 | 21; 15 | 11; 21 |
| 3 | (Canada) (Russia) | Rachel Chan; Evgeniya Kosetskaya | 18; 21 | 15; 21 |
| 4 | (Canada) (Russia) | Nyl Yakura / Brian Yang; Vladimir Ivanov / Ivan Sozonov | 14; 21 | 15; 21 |
| 5 | (Canada) (Russia) | Catherine Choi / Crystal Lai; Alina Davletova / Ekaterina Malkova | 11; 21 | 16; 21 |

== Group D ==
| Pos | Team | Pld | W | L | GF | GA | GD | PF | PA | PD | Pts | Qualification |
|---|---|---|---|---|---|---|---|---|---|---|---|---|
| 1 | Japan | 3 | 3 | 0 | 29 | 3 | +26 | 665 | 383 | +282 | 3 | Advance to quarter-finals |
| 2 | Malaysia | 3 | 2 | 1 | 19 | 13 | +6 | 593 | 482 | +111 | 2 | Advance to quarter-finals |
| 3 | England | 3 | 1 | 2 | 15 | 17 | −2 | 570 | 527 | +43 | 1 | |
| 4 | Egypt | 3 | 0 | 3 | 0 | 30 | −30 | 194 | 630 | −436 | 0 | |

Source: TournamentSoftware.com
Rules for classification: Tiebreakers

=== Malaysia vs England ===
Malaysia
3
Energia Areena Court 2
27 September 2021, 10:00 UTC+3

England
2

| | | | 1 | 2 | 3 |
|---|---|---|---|---|---|
| 1 | (Malaysia) (England) | Hoo Pang Ron / Cheah Yee See; Marcus Ellis / Lauren Smith | 21; 19 | 21; 18 |
| 2 | (Malaysia) (England) | Lee Zii Jia; Johnnie Torjussen | 21; 4 | 21; 15 |
| 3 | (Malaysia) (England) | Aaron Chia / Soh Wooi Yik; Ben Lane / Sean Vendy | 22; 20 | 21; 18 |
| 4 | (Malaysia) (England) | Kisona Selvaduray; Abigail Holden | 16; 21 | 20; 22 |
| 5 | (Malaysia) (England) | Pearly Tan / Thinaah Muralitharan; Chloe Birch / Lauren Smith | 18; 21 | 21; 17 | 10; 21 |

=== Japan vs Egypt ===
Japan
5
Energia Areena Court 3
27 September 2021, 10:00 UTC+3

Egypt
0

| | | | 1 | 2 | 3 |
|---|---|---|---|---|---|
| 1 | (Japan) (Egypt) | Yuki Kaneko / Misaki Matsutomo; Ahmed Salah / Nour Ahmed Youssri | 21; 4 | 21; 6 |
| 2 | (Japan) (Egypt) | Kenta Nishimoto; Adham Hatem Elgamal | 21; 5 | 21; 5 |
| 3 | (Japan) (Egypt) | Sayaka Takahashi; Doha Hany | 21; 4 | 21; 2 |
| 4 | (Japan) (Egypt) | Takuro Hoki / Yugo Kobayashi; Adham Hatem Elgamal / Mohamed Mostafa Kamel | 21; 4 | 21; 6 |
| 5 | (Japan) (Egypt) | Nami Matsuyama / Chiharu Shida; Nour Ahmed Youssri / Doha Hany | 21; 7 | 21; 5 |

=== Japan vs England ===
Japan
5
Energia Areena Court 1
28 September 2021, 16:00 UTC+3

England
0

| | | | 1 | 2 | 3 |
|---|---|---|---|---|---|
| 1 | (Japan) (England) | Yuta Watanabe / Arisa Higashino; Marcus Ellis / Lauren Smith | 21; 16 | 21; 12 |
| 2 | (Japan) (England) | Kento Momota; Johnnie Torjussen | 22; 20 | 21; 10 |
| 3 | (Japan) (England) | Akira Koga / Taichi Saito; Ben Lane / Sean Vendy | 21; 17 | 19; 21 | 21; 12 |
| 4 | (Japan) (England) | Akane Yamaguchi; Abigail Holden | 21; 16 | 21; 12 |
| 5 | (Japan) (England) | Nami Matsuyama / Chiharu Shida; Chloe Birch / Lauren Smith | 21; 16 | 21; 12 |

=== Malaysia vs Egypt ===
Malaysia
5
Energia Areena Court 2
28 September 2021, 16:00 UTC+3

Egypt
0

| | | | 1 | 2 | 3 |
|---|---|---|---|---|---|
| 1 | (Malaysia) (Egypt) | Chen Tang Jie / Peck Yen Wei; Ahmed Salah / Nour Ahmed Youssri | 21; 6 | 21; 7 |
| 2 | (Malaysia) (Egypt) | Ng Tze Yong; Mohamed Mostafa Kamel | 21; 8 | 21; 2 |
| 3 | (Malaysia) (Egypt) | Eoon Qi Xuan; Doha Hany | 21; 5 | 21; 7 |
| 4 | (Malaysia) (Egypt) | Man Wei Chong / Tee Kai Wun; Mohamed Mostafa Kamel / Ahmed Salah | 21; 7 | 21; 6 |
| 5 | (Malaysia) (Egypt) | Teoh Mei Xing / Yap Ling; Nour Ahmed Youssri / Doha Hany | 21; 4 | 21; 9 |

=== Japan vs Malaysia ===
Japan
4
Energia Areena Court 1
30 September 2021, 16:00 UTC+3

Malaysia
1

| | | | 1 | 2 | 3 |
|---|---|---|---|---|---|
| 1 | (Japan) (Malaysia) | Takuro Hoki / Yugo Kobayashi; Aaron Chia / Soh Wooi Yik | 20; 22 | 21; 14 | 16; 21 |
| 2 | (Japan) (Malaysia) | Akane Yamaguchi; Kisona Selvaduray | 21; 14 | 21; 14 |
| 3 | (Japan) (Malaysia) | Kento Momota; Lee Zii Jia | 21; 18 | 21; 10 |
| 4 | (Japan) (Malaysia) | Nami Matsuyama / Chiharu Shida; Pearly Tan / Thinaah Muralitharan | 21; 16 | 21; 17 |
| 5 | (Japan) (Malaysia) | Yuta Watanabe / Arisa Higashino; Hoo Pang Ron / Cheah Yee See | 21; 16 | 21; 9 |

=== England vs Egypt ===
England
5
Energia Areena Court 2
30 September 2021, 16:00 UTC+3

Egypt
0

| | | | 1 | 2 | 3 |
|---|---|---|---|---|---|
| 1 | (England) (Egypt) | Callum Hemming / Jessica Pugh; Mohamed Mostafa Kamel / Doha Hany | 21; 7 | 21; 3 |
| 2 | (England) (Egypt) | Johnnie Torjussen; Adham Hatem Elgamal | 21; 7 | 21; 4 |
| 3 | (England) (Egypt) | Estelle van Leeuwen; Nour Ahmed Youssri | 21; 11 | 21; 15 |
| 4 | (England) (Egypt) | Callum Hemming / Steven Stallwood; Adham Hatem Elgamal / Ahmed Salah | 21; 11 | 21; 8 |
| 5 | (England) (Egypt) | Jessica Hopton / Jessica Pugh; Nour Ahmed Youssri / Doha Hany | 21; 10 | 21; 9 |
