= China national badminton team =

Team representing China in international badminton team competitions

China
- Association: Chinese Badminton Association (CBA)
- Confederation: BA (Asia)
- Chairman: Zhang Xin

BWF ranking
- Current ranking: 1 (6 October 2026)
- Highest ranking: 1 (1 July 2011)

Sudirman Cup
- Appearances: 19 (first in 1989)
- Best result: Champions (1995, 1997, 1999, 2001, 2005, 2007, 2009, 2011, 2013, 2015, 2019, 2021, 2023, 2025)

Thomas Cup
- Appearances: 23 (first in 1982)
- Best result: Champions (1982, 1986, 1988, 1990, 2004, 2006, 2008, 2010, 2012, 2018, 2024, 2026)

Uber Cup
- Appearances: 22 (first in 1984)
- Best result: Champions (1984, 1986, 1988, 1990, 1992, 1998, 2000, 2002, 2004, 2006, 2008, 2012, 2014, 2016, 2020, 2024)

Asian Mixed Team Championships
- Appearances: 4 (first in 2017)
- Best result: Champions (2019, 2023)

Asian Men's Team Championships
- Appearances: 9 (first in 1976)
- Best result: Champions (1983, 1985, 1987, 1989, 2004, 2012, 2024)

Asian Women's Team Championships
- Appearances: 3 (first in 2012)
- Best result: Champions (2016)

The China national badminton team (Chinese: 中国国家羽毛球队; pinyin: Zhōngguó guójiā yǔmáoqiú duì) is a badminton team that represents the People's Republic of China in international badminton team competitions. In addition to the first national team, there is also the second national badminton team of China. Immediately afterward, there is the China National Badminton National Youth Team. All team procedures are managed by the China Badminton Association. The Chinese National Badminton Team is the most successful badminton team in history, having won 12 Thomas Cups, 16 Uber Cups, and 14 Sudirman Cups. China is also the only country to achieve a clean sweep of badminton gold medals at the Olympics, doing so in 2012.

== History and introduction ==
After the 2012 Olympics, the Chinese team adjusted the coaching team and merged the original first and second teams. The players are divided into four groups: "men's singles", "women's singles", "men's doubles" and "women's doubles". Chen Jin (women's singles group), Chen Qiqiu (men's doubles group), and Liu Yong (women's doubles group) served as the head coaches.

In 2012, several Chinese double badminton players, including Yu Yang and her match partner Wang Xiaoli were disqualified from the Olympics for throwing a match.

== Competitive record ==
=== Participation in BWF competitions ===
==== Thomas Cup ====
Year	Round	Pos
1949	Did not enter	
1952	Did not enter	
1955	Did not enter	
1958	Did not enter	
1961	Did not enter	
1964	Did not enter	
1967	Did not enter	
1970	Did not enter	
1973	Did not enter	
1976	Did not enter	
1979	Did not enter	
1982	Champions	1st
1984	Runners-up	2nd
1986	Champions	1st
1988	Champions	1st
1990	Champions	1st
1992	Semi-finals	3rd
1994	Semi-finals	4th
1996	Semi-finals	3rd
1998	Semi-finals	4th
2000	Runners-up	2nd
2002	Semi-finals	4th
2004	Champions	1st
2006	Champions	1st
2008	Champions	1st
2010	Champions	1st
2012	Champions	1st
2014	Semi-finals	4th
2016	Quarter-finals	5th
2018	Champions	1st
2020	Runners-up	2nd
2022	Quarter-finals	7th
2024	Champions	1st
2026	Champions	1st
2028	TBD	
2030	TBD	

==== Uber Cup ====
Year	Round	Pos
1957	Did not enter	
1960	Did not enter	
1963	Did not enter	
1966	Did not enter	
1969	Did not enter	
1972	Did not enter	
1975	Did not enter	
1978	Did not enter	
1981	Did not enter	
1984	Champions	1st
1986	Champions	1st
1988	Champions	1st
1990	Champions	1st
1992	Champions	1st
1994	Runners-up	2nd
1996	Runners-up	2nd
1998	Champions	1st
2000	Champions	1st
2002	Champions	1st
2004	Champions	1st
2006	Champions	1st
2008	Champions	1st
2010	Runners-up	2nd
2012	Champions	1st
2014	Champions	1st
2016	Champions	1st
2018	Semi-finals	4th
2020	Champions	1st
2022	Runners-up	2nd
2024	Champions	1st
2026	Runners-up	2nd
2028	TBD	
2030	TBD	

==== Sudirman Cup ====
Year	Round	Pos
1989	Semi-finals	3rd
1991	Semi-finals	3rd
1993	Semi-finals	3rd
1995	Champions	1st
1997	Champions	1st
1999	Champions	1st
2001	Champions	1st
2003	Runners-up	2nd
2005	Champions	1st
2007	Champions	1st
2009	Champions	1st
2011	Champions	1st
2013	Champions	1st
2015	Champions	1st
2017	Runners-up	2nd
2019	Champions	1st
2021	Champions	1st
2023	Champions	1st
2025	Champions	1st
2027	TBD	
2029	TBD	

=== WBF World Championships ===
==== Men's team ====
Year	Round	Pos
1979	Champions	1st

==== Women's team ====
Year	Round	Pos
1979	Champions	1st

=== GANEFO ===
==== Men's team ====
Year	Round	Pos
1963	Runners-up	2nd
1966	Champions	1st

==== Women's team ====
Year	Round	Pos
1963	Champions	1st
1966	Champions	1st

=== Asian Games ===
==== Men's team ====
Year	Round	Pos
1962	Did not enter	
1966	Did not enter	
1970	Did not enter	
1974	Champions	1st
1978	Runners-up	2nd
1982	Champions	1st
1986	Runners-up	2nd
1990	Champions	1st
1994	Semi-finals	3rd
1998	Runners-up	2nd
2002	Semi-finals	3rd
2006	Champions	1st
2010	Champions	1st
2014	Runners-up	2nd
2018	Champions	1st
2022	Champions	1st
2026	Champions	1st
2030	TBD	
2034	TBD	
2038	TBD	

==== Women's team ====
Year	Round	Pos
1962	Did not enter	
1966	Did not enter	
1970	Did not enter	
1974	Champions	1st
1978	Champions	1st
1982	Champions	1st
1986	Champions	1st
1990	Champions	1st
1994	Semi-finals	4th
1998	Champions	1st
2002	Champions	1st
2006	Champions	1st
2010	Champions	1st
2014	Champions	1st
2018	Runners-up	2nd
2022	Runners-up	2nd
2026	TBD	
2030	TBD	
2034	TBD	
2038	TBD	

=== Asian Team Championships ===
==== Men's team ====
Year	Round	Pos
1962	Did not enter	
1965	Did not enter	
1969	Did not enter	
1971	Did not enter	
1976	Runners-up	2nd
1983	Champions	1st
1985	Champions	1st
1987	Champions	1st
1989	Champions	1st
1993	Runners-up	2nd
2004	Champions	1st
2006	Did not enter	
2008	Did not enter	
2010	Did not enter	
2012	Champions	1st
2016	Quarter-finals	8th
2018	Runners-up	2nd
2020	Withdrew	
2022	Did not enter	
2024	Champions	1st
2026	Runners-up	2nd
2028	TBD	
2030	TBD	

==== Women's team ====
Year	Round	Pos
2004	Did not enter	
2006	Did not enter	
2008	Did not enter	
2010	Did not enter	
2012	Runners-up	2nd
2016	Champions	1st
2018	Runners-up	2nd
2020	Withdrew	
2022	Did not enter	
2024	Quarter-finals	8th
2026	Runners-up	2nd
2028	TBD	
2030	TBD	

==== Mixed team ====
Year	Round	Pos
2017	Semi-finals	3rd
2019	Champions	1st
2023	Champions	1st
2025	Runners-up	2nd

=== Asia Cup ===
==== Men's team ====
Year	Round	Pos
1997	Did not enter	
1999	Fourth place	4th
2001	Champions	1st

=== East Asian Games ===
==== Men's team ====
Year	Round	Pos
1993	Champions	1st
1997	Runners-up	2nd
2009	Champions	1st
2013	Champions	1st

==== Women's team ====
Year	Round	Pos
1993	Champions	1st
1997	Champions	1st
2009	Champions	1st
2013	Champions	1st

=== FISU World University Games ===
==== Mixed team ====
Year	Round	Pos
2007	Runners-up	2nd
2011	Runners-up	2nd
2013	Runners-up	2nd
2015	Runners-up	2nd
2017	Did not enter	
2021	Runners-up	2nd
2025	TBD	

=== World University Team Championships ===
==== Mixed team ====
Year	Round	Pos
2008	Champions	1st
2010	Champions	1st
2012	Runners-up	2nd
2014	Champions	1st
2016	Runners-up	2nd
2018	Runners-up	2nd

**Red border color indicates tournament was held on home soil.

== Junior competitive record ==
=== Suhandinata Cup ===
Year	Round	Pos
(China) 2000	Champions	1st of 24
(South Africa) 2002	Champions	1st of 23
(Canada) 2004	Champions	1st of 20
(South Korea) 2006	Runners-up	2nd of 28
(New Zealand) 2007	Champions	1st of 25
(India) 2008	Champions	1st of 21
(Malaysia) 2009	Champions	1st of 21
(Mexico) 2010	Champions	1st of 24
(Taiwan) 2011	Did not enter	
(Japan) 2012	Champions	1st of 30
(Thailand) 2013	Third place	3rd of 30
(Malaysia) 2014	Champions	1st of 33
(Peru) 2015	Champions	1st of 39
(Spain) 2016	Champions	1st of 52
(Indonesia) 2017	Champions	1st of 44
(Canada) 2018	Champions	1st of 39
(Russia) 2019	Runners-up	2nd of 43
(New Zealand) 2020	Cancelled because of COVID-19 pandemic	
(China) 2021	Cancelled because of COVID-19 pandemic	
(Spain) 2022	Quarter-finals	5th of 37
(United States) 2023	Champions	1st of 38
(China) 2024	Runners-up	2nd of 39
(India) 2025	Champions	1st of 36
(Egypt) 2026	Champions	1st of 47

=== Asian Junior Team Championships ===
==== Boys' team ====
Year	Round	Pos
1997	Champions	1st
1998	Champions	1st
1999	Runners-up	2nd
2000	Champions	1st
2001	Did not enter	
2002	Semi-finals	4th
2004	Champions	1st
2005	Runners-up	2nd

==== Girls' team ====
Year	Round	Pos
1997	Champions	1st
1998	Champions	1st
1999	Champions	1st
2000	Champions	1st
2001	Did not enter	
2002	Champions	1st
2004	Champions	1st
2005	Champions	1st

==== Mixed team ====
Year	Round	Pos
2006	Semi-finals	3rd
2007	Runners-up	2nd
2008	Champions	1st
2009	Runners-up	2nd
2010	Champions	1st
2011	Champions	1st
2012	Runners-up	2nd
2013	Champions	1st
2014	Champions	1st
2015	Champions	1st
2016	Champions	1st
2017	Quarter-finals	7th
2018	Champions	1st
2019	Semi-finals	4th
2023	Quarter-finals	8th
2024	Champions	1st
2025	Champions	1st
2026	Champions	1st

**Red border color indicates tournament was held on home soil.

== Players ==
=== Current squad ===
As of 16 April 2024

==== Men's team ====
Name	DoB/Age	Ranking of event		
Name	DoB/Age	MS	MD	XD
Shi Yuqi	28 February 1996 (age 30)	1	-	-
Li Shifeng	9 January 2000 (age 26)	7	-	-
Weng Hongyang	18 June 1999 (age 27)	15	-	-
Lu Guangzu	19 October 1996 (age 30)	24	-	-
Wang Zhengxing	21 February 2002 (age 24)	27	-	-
Liang Weikeng	30 November 2000 (age 25)	-	1	-
Wang Chang	7 May 2001 (age 25)	-	1	-
Liu Yuchen	25 July 1995 (age 31)	-	8	-
Ou Xuanyi	23 January 1994 (age 32)	-	8	-
Zheng Siwei	26 February 1997 (age 29)	-	-	1
Feng Yanzhe	13 February 2001 (age 25)	-	-	2
Jiang Zhenbang	28 May 2001 (age 25)	-	-	5

==== Women's team ====
Name	DoB/Age	Ranking of event		
Name	DoB/Age	WS	WD	XD
Chen Yufei	1 March 1998 (age 28)	2	-	-
He Bingjiao	21 March 1997 (age 29)	6	-	-
Han Yue	18 November 1999 (age 26)	7	-	-
Wang Zhiyi	29 April 2000 (age 26)	8	-	-
Zhang Yiman	15 January 1997 (age 29)	15	-	-
Chen Qingchen	23 June 1997 (age 29)	-	1	-
Jia Yifan	29 June 1998 (age 28)	-	1	-
Liu Shengshu	8 April 2004 (age 22)	-	3	-
Tan Ning	3 April 2003 (age 23)	-	3	-
Huang Yaqiong	28 February 1994 (age 32)	-	-	1
Huang Dongping	30 April 1995 (age 31)	-	-	2
Wei Yaxin	18 April 2000 (age 26)	-	-	5

=== Previous squads ===
==== Thomas Cup ====
- 2008, 2010, 2012, 2014, 2016, 2018, 2020, 2022

==== Uber Cup ====
- 2008, 2010, 2012, 2014, 2016, 2018, 2020, 2022

==== Sudirman Cup ====
- 2015, 2017, 2019, 2021, 2023

==== Asian Team Championships ====
- Men's team: 2018
- Women's team: 2018
- Mixed team: 2023
