= Chinese Taipei national badminton team =

Team representing Taiwan in international badminton team competitions

Chinese Taipei
- Association: Chinese Taipei Badminton Association (CTBA)
- Confederation: BA (Asia)
- President: Willi Chang

BWF ranking
- Current ranking: 5 ▲1 (6 October 2026)
- Highest ranking: 5 (5 July 2018)

Sudirman Cup
- Appearances: 17 (first in 1989)
- Best result: Quarter-finals (2011, 2013, 2015, 2017, 2019, 2021, 2023)

Thomas Cup
- Appearances: 7 (first in 2014)
- Best result: Semi-finals (2024)

Uber Cup
- Appearances: 10 (first in 2004)
- Best result: Semi-finals (2006)

Asian Mixed Team Championships
- Appearances: 3 (first in 2017)
- Best result: Quarter-finals (2017, 2019)

Asian Men's Team Championships
- Appearances: 3 (first in 2016)
- Best result: Quarter-finals (2016, 2020)

Asian Women's Team Championships
- Appearances: 3 (first in 2016)
- Best result: Quarter-finals (2016, 2018, 2020)

The Chinese Taipei national badminton team (Chinese: 中華台北國家羽球代表隊; pinyin: Zhōnghuá táiběi guójiā yǔmáoqiú duì; Pe̍h-ōe-jī: Tiong-hôa Tâi-pak kok-ka ú-mô͘-kiû tūi) is a badminton team that represents Taiwan in international badminton team competitions. The national team was formed in 1973. The Chinese Taipei women's team finished as semifinalists at the 2006 Uber Cup.

The mixed team have never got past the quarterfinals at the Sudirman Cup.

== Multi-sports Games performance ==
=== Olympic Games ===
Men's singles

Player	1996 (United States)	2000 (Australia)	2004 (Greece)	2008 (China)	2012 (United Kingdom)	2016 (Brazil)	2020 (Japan)	2024 (France)	Participants	W–L	%
Chang Jeng-shyuang	2R; 0–1								1	0–1	0%
Liu En-hung	3R; 2–1								1	2–1	66.67%
Fung Permadi		3R; 1–1							1	1–1	50.00%
Chien Yu-hsiu			1R; 0–1						1	0–1	0%
Hsieh Yu-hsing				QF; 3–1					1	3–1	75.00%
Hsu Jen-hao					G3; 0–2				1	0–2	0%
Chou Tien-chen						QF; 3–1	QF; 2–1	QF; 3–1	3	8–3	72.73%
Wang Tzu-wei							R16; 2–1		1	2–1	66.67%

Women's singles

Player	1996 (United States)	2000 (Australia)	2004 (Greece)	2008 (China)	2012 (United Kingdom)	2016 (Brazil)	2020 (Japan)	2024 (France)	Participants	W–L	%
Huang Chia-chi	3R; 2–1	QF; 2–1							2	4–2	66.67%
Jeng Shwu-zen	2R; 1–1								1	1–1	50.00%
Chan Ya-lin		3R; 1–1							1	1–1	50.00%
Cheng Shao-chieh			QF; 2–1	2R; 0–1	QF; 3–1				3	5–3	62.50%
Tai Tzu-ying					R16; 2–1	R16; 2–1	S 5–1	G2; 1–1	4	10–4	71.43%

Men's doubles

Player	1996 (United States)	2000 (Australia)	2004 (Greece)	2008 (China)	2012 (United Kingdom)	2016 (Brazil)	2020 (Japan)	2024 (France)	Participants	W–L	%
Fang Chieh-min; Lee Sheng-mu					QF; 2–2				1	2–2	50.00%
Lee Sheng-mu; Tsai Chia-hsin						G3; 1–2			1	1–2	33.33%
Lee Yang; Wang Chi-lin							G 5–1	G 7–0	2	12–1	92.31%

Women's doubles

Player	1996 (United States)	2000 (Australia)	2004 (Greece)	2008 (China)	2012 (United Kingdom)	2016 (Brazil)	2020 (Japan)	2024 (France)	Participants	W–L	%
Chen Li-chin; Tsai Hui-min	1R; 0–1	1R; 0–1							2	0–2	0%
Cheng Wen-hsing; Chien Yu-chin			2R; 1–1	2R; 1–1	QF; 2–2				3	4–4	50.00%

Mixed doubles

Player	1996 (United States)	2000 (Australia)	2004 (Greece)	2008 (China)	2012 (United Kingdom)	2016 (Brazil)	2020 (Japan)	2024 (France)	Participants	W–L	%
Tsai Chia-hsin; Cheng Wen-hsing			2R; 1–1						1	1–1	50.00%
Chen Hung-ling; Cheng Wen-hsing					G3; 1–2				1	1–2	33.33%
Ye Hong-wei; Lee Chia-hsin								G3; 0–2	1	0–2	0%

=== Paralympic Games ===
Men's singles

Player	Classification	2020 (Japan)	2024 (France)	Participants	W–L	%
Fang Jen-yu	SU5	4th 2–3	G4; 0–3	2	2–6	25.00%

Women's singles

Player	Classification	2020 (Japan)	2024 (France)	Participants	W–L	%
Hu Guang-chiou	WH1		QF; 2–2	1	2–2	50.00%
Yang I-chen	WH2		G4; 0–3	1	0–3	0%
Cai Yi-lin	SH6		G4; 0–3	1	0–3	0%

Women's doubles

Player	Classification	2020 (Japan)	2024 (France)	Participants	W–L	%
Hu Guang-chiou; Yang I-chen	WH1–WH2		G3; 0–2	1	0–2	0%

== Competitive record ==
=== Thomas Cup ===
Year	Round	Pos
1949	Did not enter	
1952	Did not enter	
1955	Did not enter	
1958	Did not enter	
1961	Did not enter	
1964	Did not qualify	
1967	Did not enter	
1970	Did not enter	
1973	Did not enter	
1976	Did not qualify	
1979	Did not qualify	
1982	Did not qualify	
1984	Did not qualify	
1986	Did not qualify	
1988	Did not qualify	
1990	Did not qualify	
1992	Did not qualify	
1994	Did not qualify	
1996	Did not qualify	
1998	Did not qualify	
2000	Did not qualify	
2002	Did not qualify	
2004	Did not qualify	
2006	Did not qualify	
2008	Did not qualify	
2010	Did not qualify	
2012	Did not qualify	
2014	Group stage	9th
2016	Quarter-finals	6th
2018	Quarter-finals	8th
2020	Group stage	9th
2022	Quarter-finals	6th
2024	Semi-finals	4th
2026	Quarter-finals	7th
2028	TBD	
2030	TBD	

=== Uber Cup ===
Year	Round	Pos
1957	Did not enter	
1960	Did not enter	
1963	Did not enter	
1966	Did not enter	
1969	Did not enter	
1972	Did not enter	
1975	Did not enter	
1978	Did not qualify	
1981	Did not qualify	
1984	Did not qualify	
1986	Did not qualify	
1988	Did not qualify	
1990	Did not qualify	
1992	Did not qualify	
1994	Did not qualify	
1996	Did not qualify	
1998	Did not qualify	
2000	Did not qualify	
2002	Did not qualify	
2004	Quarter-finals	6th
2006	Semi-finals	3rd
2008	Did not qualify	
2010	Did not qualify	
2012	Quarter-finals	6th
2014	Group stage	12th
2016	Quarter-finals	6th
2018	Quarter-finals	5th
2020	Quarter-finals	5th
2022	Quarter-finals	6th
2024	Quarter-finals	8th
2026	Quarter-finals	5th
2028	TBD	
2030	TBD	

=== Sudirman Cup ===
Year	Round	Pos
1989	Group stage	11th
1991	Group stage	10th
1993	Did not enter	
1995	Group stage	11th
1997	Group stage	9th
1999	Group stage	13th
2001	Group stage	12th
2003	Group stage	11th
2005	Group stage	14th
2007	Group stage	12th
2009	Group stage	11th
2011	Quarter-finals	6th
2013	Quarter-finals	6th
2015	Quarter-finals	7th
2017	Quarter-finals	5th
2019	Quarter-finals	6th
2021	Quarter-finals	8th
2023	Quarter-finals	7th
2025	Quarter-finals	8th
2027	To be determined	
2029	To be determined	

=== Asian Games ===
==== Men's team ====
Year	Round	Pos
1962	Withdrew	
1966	Semi-finals	3rd
1970	Quarter-finals	5th
1974	Did not enter	
1978	Did not enter	
1982	Did not enter	
1986	Did not enter	
1990	Did not enter	
1994	Quarter-finals	5th
1998	Quarter-finals	6th
2002	Did not enter	
2006	Did not enter	
2010	Quarter-finals	6th
2014	Semi-finals	3rd
2018	Semi-finals	4th
2022	Quarter-finals	5th
2026	Quarter-finals	
2030	TBD	
2034	TBD	
2038	TBD	

==== Women's team ====
Year	Round	Pos
1962	Did not enter	
1966	Did not enter	
1970	Did not enter	
1974	Did not enter	
1978	Did not enter	
1982	Did not enter	
1986	Did not enter	
1990	Did not enter	
1994	Did not enter	
1998	Quarter-finals	6th
2002	Did not enter	
2006	Did not enter	
2010	Quarter-finals	7th
2014	Quarter-finals	8th
2018	Quarter-finals	5th
2022	Quarter-finals	5th
2026	Quarter-finals	
2030	TBD	
2034	TBD	
2038	TBD	

=== Asian Team Championships ===
==== Men's team ====
Year	Round	Pos
1962	Quarter-finals	
1965	Did not enter	
1969	Round of 16	
1971	Withdrew	
1976	Did not enter	
1983	Did not enter	
1985	Did not enter	
1987	Group stage	
1989	Group stage	
1993	Semi-finals	4th
2004	Group stage	
2006	Group stage	6th
2008	Group stage	7th
2010	Group stage	6th
2012	Group stage	6th
2016	Quarter-finals	
2018	Group stage	
2020	Quarter-finals	
2022	Withdrew	
2024	Quarter-finals	6th
2026	Quarter-finals	7th
2028	TBD	
2030	TBD	

==== Women's team ====
Year	Round	Pos
2004	Runners-up	2nd
2006	Runners-up	2nd
2008	Group stage	7th
2010	Group stage	6th
2012	Fourth place	4th
2016	Quarter-finals	
2018	Quarter-finals	
2020	Quarter-finals	
2022	Withdrew	
2024	Quarter-finals	6th
2026	Semi-finals	4th
2028	TBD	
2030	TBD	

==== Mixed team ====
Year	Round	Pos
2017	Quarter-finals	
2019	Quarter-finals	
2023	Group stage	10th
2025	Quarter-finals	8th

=== East Asian Games ===
==== Men's team ====
Year	Round	Pos
1993	Runners-up	2nd
1997	Semi-finals	3rd
2009	Semi-finals	3rd
2013	Third place	3rd

==== Women's team ====
Year	Round	Pos
1993	Did not enter	
1997	Semi-finals	4th
2009	Runners-up	2nd
2013	Runners-up	2nd

=== FISU World University Games ===
==== Mixed team ====
Year	Round	Pos
2007	Semi-finals	4th
2011	Semi-finals	3rd
2013	Semi-finals	3rd
2015	Quarter-finals	
2017	Champions	1st
2021	Champions	1st
2025	Runners-up	2nd

=== World University Team Championships ===
==== Mixed team ====
Year	Round	Pos
2008	Quarter-finals	
2010	Runners-up	2nd
2012	Semi-finals	4th
2014	Semi-finals	3rd
2016	Champions	1st
2018	Semi-finals	3rd

**Red border color indicates tournament was held on home soil.

== Junior competitive record ==
=== Suhandinata Cup ===
Year	Round	Pos
2000	Fourth place	4th
2002	Group stage	5th
2004	Fourth place	4th
2006	Group stage	9th
2007	Group stage	21st
2008	Group stage	9th
2009	Fourth place	4th
2010	Group stage	7th
2011	Third place	3rd
2012	Quarter-finals	5th
2013	Quarter-finals	7th
2014	Quarter-finals	7th
2015	Third place	3rd
2016	Quarter-finals	6th
2017	Group stage	11th
2018	Quarter-finals	7th
2019	Group stage	10th
2020	Cancelled because of COVID-19 pandemic	
2021	Cancelled because of COVID-19 pandemic	
2022	Runners-up	2nd
2023	Semi-finals	3rd
2024	Quarter-finals	5th
2025	Quarter-finals	6th of 36
2026	Group stage	11th of 47

=== Asian Junior Team Championships ===
==== Boys' team ====
Year	Round	Pos
1997	Quarter-finals	
1998	Semi-finals	4th
1999	Quarter-finals	
2000	Quarter-finals	
2001	Runners-up	2nd
2002	Quarter-finals	
2004	Quarter-finals	
2005	Quarter-finals	

==== Girls' team ====
Year	Round	Pos
1997	Quarter-finals	
1998	Semi-finals	4th
1999	Semi-finals	4th
2000	Semi-finals	4th
2001	Runners-up	2nd
2002	Round of 16	
2004	Semi-finals	3rd
2005	Quarter-finals	

==== Mixed team ====
Year	Round	Pos
2006	Quarter-finals	
2007	Group stage	
2008	Quarter-finals	
2009	Group stage	
2010	Group stage	
2011	Quarter-finals	
2012	Quarter-finals	
2013	Quarter-finals	
2014	Semi-finals	3rd
2015	Group stage	
2016	Group stage	
2017	Quarter-finals	
2018	Quarter-finals	
2019	Group stage	
2023	Semi-finals	3rd
2024	Quarter-finals	8th
2025	Group stage	9th
2026	Quarter-finals	7th

**Red border color indicates tournament was held on home soil.

== Players ==
=== Current squad ===
As of 2 January 2024

==== Men's team ====
Name	DoB/Age	Ranking of event		
Name	DoB/Age	MS	MD	XD
Chou Tien-chen	8 January 1990 (age 36)	14	-	-
Lin Chun-yi	2 October 1999 (age 27)	21	-	-
Wang Tzu-wei	27 February 1995 (age 31)	28	-	-
Lee Chia-hao	4 June 1999 (age 27)	33	1350	-
Su Li-yang	27 December 2001 (age 24)	35	-	-
Lee Yang	12 August 1995 (age 31)	-	10	-
Wang Chi-lin	18 January 1995 (age 31)	-	10	-
Lee Jhe-huei	20 March 1994 (age 32)	-	17	37
Yang Po-hsuan	23 August 1996 (age 30)	-	17	32
Lu Ching-yao	7 June 1993 (age 33)	-	23	-
Yang Po-han	13 March 1994 (age 32)	-	23	-
Ye Hong-wei	28 May 2001 (age 25)	-	1350	12

==== Women's team ====
Name	DoB/Age	Ranking of event		
Name	DoB/Age	WS	WD	XD
Tai Tzu-ying	20 June 1994 (age 32)	4	-	-
Hsu Wen-chi	28 September 1997 (age 29)	23	979	-
Pai Yu-po	18 April 1991 (age 35)	29	-	-
Sung Shuo-yun	15 June 1997 (age 29)	30	54	-
Lin Hsiang-ti	20 November 1998 (age 27)	41	-	-
Lee Chia-hsin	14 May 1997 (age 29)	-	23	12
Teng Chun-hsun	27 September 2000 (age 26)	-	23	1453
Hsu Ya-ching	30 July 1991 (age 35)	-	27	37
Lin Wan-ching	1 November 1995 (age 31)	-	27	-
Chang Ching-hui	17 May 1996 (age 30)	-	39	83
Yang Ching-tun	17 November 1995 (age 30)	-	39	70
Yu Chien-hui	8 May 1995 (age 31)	236	54	-

=== Previous squads ===
==== Thomas Cup ====
- 2014, 2016, 2018, 2020, 2022

==== Uber Cup ====
- 2012, 2014, 2016, 2018, 2020, 2022

==== Sudirman Cup ====
- 2015, 2017, 2019, 2021, 2023

==== Asian Team Championships ====
- Men's team: 2018
- Women's team: 2018
- Mixed team: 2023
