= Malaysia national badminton team =

Malaysian national badminton team

Malaysia
- Association: Badminton Association of Malaysia
- Confederation: Badminton Asia
- President: Tengku Zafrul Aziz

BWF ranking
- Current ranking: 8 ▼1 (6 October 2026)
- Highest ranking: 4 (1 April 2025)

Sudirman Cup
- Appearances: 17 (first in 1989)
- Best result: Semi-finals (2009, 2021, 2023)

Thomas Cup
- Appearances: 31 (first in 1949)
- Best result: Champions (1949, 1952, 1955, 1967, 1992)

Uber Cup
- Appearances: 16 (first in 1957)
- Best result: Quarter-finals (2004, 2008, 2010, 2026)

Asian Mixed Team Championships
- Appearances: 2 (first in 2017)
- Best result: Quarter-finals (2017, 2019)

Asian Men's Team Championships
- Appearances: 13 (first in 1962)
- Best result: Champions (1962, 1965, 2022)

Asian Women's Team Championships
- Appearances: 4 (first in 2016)
- Best result: Semi-finals (2020, 2022)

The Malaysia national badminton team (Malay: Pasukan badminton kebangsaan Malaysia) is a badminton team that plays for Malaysia in international competitions. The men's team has won the Thomas Cup five times, most recently in 1992 and became runner-up nine times. In the Uber Cup competition, the women's team with the best results in 1975, 2004, 2008 and 2010 edition making it to the quarter-finals. Malaysia competed in the Sudirman Cup since 1989 with the best result in 2009, 2021 and 2023, placed third.

== Competitive record ==
=== International ===
==== Thomas & Uber Cup ====
Thomas Cup Record		Uber Cup Record	
Year	Round	Year	Round
2026	Quarterfinal − 8th	2026	Quarterfinal − 6th
2024	Semifinal − 3rd	2024	Group Stage − 12th
2022	Quarterfinal − 5th	2022	Group Stage − 9th
2020	Quarterfinal − 8th	2020	Group Stage − 15th
2018	Quarterfinal − 5th	2018	Group Stage − 9th
2016	Semifinal − 3rd	2016	Group Stage − 10th
2014	Runner-up	2014	Group Stage − 9th
2012	Quarterfinal	2012	DNP
2010	Semifinal	2010	Quarterfinal
2008	Semifinal	2008	Quarterfinal
2006	Semifinal	2006	DNP
2004	Quarterfinal	2004	Quarterfinal
2002	Runner-up	2002	DNP
2000	Group Stage − 5th	2000	Group Stage − 7th
1998	Runner-up	1998	DNQ
1996	Group Stage − 5th	1996	DNQ
1994	Runner-up	1994	DNQ
1992	Champion	1992	Group Stage − 5th / 6th
1990	Runner-up	1990	DNQ
1988	Runner-up	1988	Group Stage − 8th
1986	Third place	1986	DNQ
1984	Group Stage − 6th	1984	Group Stage − 8th
1982	Quarterfinal	1981	First Round
1979	Intra-zone	1978	Intra-zone
1976	Runner-up	1975	First Round
1973	Intra-zone	1972	Intra-zone
1970	Runner-up	1969	DNP
1967	Champion	1966	DNP
1964	Semifinal	1963	DNP
1961	Intra-zone	1960	Intra-zone
1958	Runner-up	1957	Intra-zone
1955	Champion		
1952	Champion		
1949	Champion		

==== Sudirman Cup ====
Sudirman Cup Record
Year	Round
2025	Quarterfinal
2023	Semifinal
2021	Semifinal
2019	Quarterfinal
2017	Quarterfinal
2015	Quarterfinal
2013	Group stage − 9th
2011	Quarterfinal
2009	Semifinal
2007	Group stage − 6th
2005	9th − Group 2 promoted
2003	8th − Group 2
2001	11th − Group 2
1999	6th − Group 1 relegated
1997	7th − Group 2 promoted
1995	DNP
1993	10th − Group 2 relegated
1991	9th − Group 2
1989	9th − Group 2

==== Commonwealth Games ====
Commonwealth Games
Year	Round
2022	
2018	
2014	
2010	
2006	
2002	-
1998	Men
1998	Women
1994	
1990	-
1986	-
1982	-
1978	

=== Asia ===
==== Asia Championships ====
Asia Championships Record
Year	Men	Women	Mixed
2026	Quarterfinals	Quarterfinals	Not Held
2025	Not Held		9th
2024	Silver	Quarterfinals	Not Held
2023	Not Held		Quarterfinals
2022	Gold	Bronze	Not Held
2020	Silver	Bronze	Not Held
2019	Not Held		Quarterfinals
2018	Bronze	Quarterfinals	Not Held
2017	Not Held		Quarterfinals
2016	Quarterfinals	Quarterfinals	Not Held

==== Asian Games ====
Asian Games Record
Year	Men	Women
2026	Quarterfinal	Quarterfinal
2022	Round of 16	DNP
2018	Round of 16	DNP
2014	Bronze	Quarterfinal
2010	Quarterfinal	Quarterfinal
2006	Bronze	League stage
2002	Bronze	Quarterfinal
1998	Bronze	Quarterfinal
1994	Bronze	DNP
1990	Silver	DNP
1986	Quarterfinal	DNP
1970	Bronze	-
1966	Silver	-
1962	Bronze	Silver

==== Southeast Asian Games ====
Southeast Asian Games Record
Year	Men	Women
2025	Silver	Bronze
2023	Silver	Quarter-finalist
2021	Silver	Quarter-finalist
2019	Silver	Bronze
2017	Silver	Silver
2015	Bronze	Silver
2013	Not Held	
2011	Silver	Bronze
2009	Silver	Gold
2007	Bronze	Bronze
2005	Gold	Bronze
2003	Bronze	DNP
2001	Gold	Bronze
1999	Silver	Bronze
1997	Silver	Bronze
1995	Silver	Bronze
1993	Silver	Bronze
1991	Gold	Bronze
1989	Gold	Bronze
1987	Silver	Bronze
1985	Silver	Bronze
1983	Silver	Bronze
1981	Silver	Bronze
1979	Silver	Bronze
1975	-	Gold
1973	Silver	Gold
1971	Gold	
1969	Not Held	
1967	Not Held	
1965	Gold	
1961	Not Held	
1959	Not Held	

== Junior competitive record ==
=== World Junior Team Championships ===
==== Suhandinata Cup ====
Year	Result
2000	Did not enter
2002	Group stage - 7th of 23
2004	Group stage - 5th of 20
2006	(bronze) Third place
2007	Fourth place
2008	(bronze) Third place
2009	(silver) Runner-up
2010	(bronze) Third place
2011	(gold) Winner
2012	Quarter-finalist
2013	Quarter-finalist
2014	Quarter-finalist
2015	Group stage - 5th of 39
2016	(silver) Runner-up
2017	(silver) Runner-up
2018	Group stage - 5th of 39
2019	Group stage - 9th of 43
2020	Cancelled
2021	Cancelled
2022	Group stage - 9th of 37
2023	(bronze) Third place
2024	(bronze) Third place
2025	Quarter-finalist - 5th of 36
2026	(silver) Runner-up

=== Asian Junior Team Championships ===
==== Men's team ====
Year	Result
1997	(bronze) Semi-finalist
1998	(silver) Runner-up
1999	(bronze) Semi-finalist
2000	(bronze) Semi-finalist
2001	(gold) Winner
2002	(bronze) Semi-finalist
2004	(bronze) Semi-finalist
2005	(bronze) Semi-finalist

==== Women's team ====
Year	Result
1997	
1998	
1999	
2000	
2001	
2002	
2004	Did not enter
2005	(silver) Runner-up

==== Mixed team ====
Year	Result
2006	(silver) Runner-up
2007	(gold) Winner
2008	(bronze) Semi-finalist
2009	(gold) Winner
2010	(silver) Runner-up
2011	(silver) Runner-up
2012	(bronze) Semi-finalist
2013	Quarter-finals
2014	Quarter-finals
2015	Quarter-finals
2016	Quarter-finals
2017	(bronze) Semi-finalist
2018	(bronze) Semi-finalist
2019	Group stage
2023	Quarter-finals
2024	(bronze) Semi-finalist
2025	Quarter-finals
2026	Quarter-finals

== Players ==
=== National senior squad ===
As of 2026 : World Ranking

Men's Singles

- Leong Jun Hao ranking-27
- Justin Hoh ranking-44
- Lee Zii Jia ranking-58
- Cheam Jun Wei ranking-60
- Eogene Ewe ranking-82

Women's Singles

- Letshanaa Karupathevan ranking-31
- Wong Ling Ching ranking-36
- Goh Jin Wei ranking-58
- Kisona Selvaduray ranking-89
- Siti Zulaikha ranking-101
- Lim Zhi Shin ranking-144

Men's Doubles

- Aaron Chia rank-4
- Soh Wooi Yik rank-4
- Goh Sze Fei rank-6
- Nur Izzuddin rank-6
- Man Wei Chong rank-11
- Tee Kai Wun rank-11
- Junaidi Arif rank-19
- Yap Roy King rank-19
- Aaron Tai rank-20
- Kang Khai Xing rank-20

Women's Doubles

- Pearly Tan rank-5
- Thinaah Muralitharan rank-5
- Ong Xin Yee rank-23
- Carmen Ting rank-23
- Low Zi Yu rank-52
- Noraqilah Maisarah rank-52
- Chong Jie Yu rank-62
- Vanessa Ng rank-62
- Cheng Su Hui rank-81
- Tan Zhing Yi rank-81

Mixed Doubles

- Chen Tang Jie rank-7
- Toh Ee Wei rank-7
- Goh Soon Huat rank-11
- Lai Shevon Jemie rank-11
- Hoo Pang Ron rank-23
- Cheng Su Yin rank-23
- Jimmy Wong rank-39
- Lai Pei Jing rank-39
- Wong Tien Ci rank-40
- Lim Chiew Sien rank-40

== Coaches ==
As of 2025 :

Director of Coaching (Singles)

- Kenneth Jonassen

Director of Coaching (Doubles)

- Rexy Mainaky

Men's Doubles Head Coach

- Herry Iman Pierngadi

Women's Doubles Head Coach

- Rosman Razak

Mixed Doubles Head Coach

- Nova Widianto

Men's Singles Coach

- K Yogendran
- Alvin Chew Ming Yao

Women's Singles Coach

- Misbun Ramdan Misbun

Men's Doubles Coach

- Muhammad Miftakh

Women's Doubles Coach

- Ching Kai Feng

Mixed Doubles Coach

- Mohd Hazwan Jamaluddin
- Mohd Lutfi Zaim Abdul Khalid

=== Previous squad ===
Thomas Cup

- 2024 Thomas Cup squad
- 2022 Thomas Cup squad
- 2020 Thomas Cup squad
- 2018 Thomas Cup squad
- 2016 Thomas Cup squad
- 2014 Thomas Cup squad
- 2012 Thomas Cup squad
- 2010 Thomas Cup squad
- 2008 Thomas Cup squad

Uber Cup

- 2024 Uber Cup squad
- 2022 Uber Cup squad
- 2020 Uber Cup squad
- 2018 Uber Cup squad
- 2016 Uber Cup squad
- 2014 Uber Cup squad
- 2010 Uber Cup squad
- 2008 Uber Cup squad

Sudirman Cup

- 2023 Sudirman Cup
- 2021 Sudirman Cup
- 2019 Sudirman Cup
- 2017 Sudirman Cup
- 2015 Sudirman Cup
