= 2010 Thomas & Uber Cup squads =

This article is a list of the confirmed squads lists for badminton's 2010 Thomas & Uber Cup between May 9 and May 16, 2010.

== Teams with Thomas and Uber Cup squads ==
=== Australia ===
Men

- Jeff Tho
- Chad Whitehead
- Stuart Gomez
- Glenn Warfe
- Raj Veeran
- Ross Smith

Women

- Leanne Choo
- Erica Pong
- Renuga Veeran
- Huang Chia Chi
- Tang Hetian
- Kate Wilson-Smith
- Eugenia Tanaka

=== China ===
Men

- Lin Dan
- Chen Jin
- Bao Chunlai
- Chen Long
- Guo Zhendong
- Xu Chen
- Cai Yun
- Fu Haifeng
- Chai Biao
- Zhang Nan

Women

- Wang Yihan
- Wang Xin
- Wang Shixian
- Jiang Yanjiao
- Ma Jin
- Wang Xiaoli
- Du Jing
- Yu Yang
- Pan Pan
- Tian Qing

=== Denmark ===
Men

- Peter Gade
- Jan Ø. Jørgensen
- Joachim Persson
- Viktor Axelsen (replacing an injured Hans-Kristian Vittinghus)
- Kenneth Jonassen
- Mathias Boe
- Carsten Mogensen
- Lars Paaske
- Jonas Rasmussen
- Thomas Laybourn

Women

- Camilla Sørensen
- Karina Jørgensen
- Mette Poulsen (replacing an injured Tine Rasmussen)
- Lena Frier Kristiansen
- Marie Røpke
- Line Damkjær Kruse
- Kamilla Rytter Juhl
- Christinna Pedersen
- Mie Schjøtt-Kristensen

=== Germany ===
Men

- Marc Zwiebler
- Dieter Domke
- Marcel Reuter
- Fabian Hammes
- Ingo Kindervater
- Michael Fuchs
- Kristof Hopp
- Johannes Schoettler
- Peter Kaesbauer
- Oliver Roth

Women

- Juliane Schenk
- Karin Schnaase
- Carola Bott
- Fabienne Deprez
- Lisa Heidenreich
- Birgit Overzier
- Sandra Marinello
- Johanna Goliszewski
- Carla Nelte

=== India ===
Men

- Chetan Anand
- Kashyap Parupalli
- Arvind Bhat
- Anup Sridhar
- R.M.V. Gurusaidutt
- Valiyaveetil Diju
- Rupesh Kumar
- Sanave Thomas
- Akshay Dewalkar
- Jishnu Sanyal

Women

- Saina Nehwal
- Aditi Mutatkar
- Sayali Gokhale
- Trupti Murgunde
- Pusarla Venkata Sindhu
- P. C. Thulasi
- Jwala Gutta
- Ashwini Ponnappa
- Shruti Kurian
- Aparna Balan

=== Indonesia ===
Men

- Taufik Hidayat
- Sony Dwi Kuncoro
- Simon Santoso
- Dionysius Hayom Rumbaka
- Markis Kido
- Hendra Setiawan
- Alvent Yulianto Chandra
- Hendra Aprida Gunawan
- Nova Widianto
- Mohammad Ahsan

Women

- Maria Febe Kusumastuti
- Adriyanti Firdasari
- Maria Kristin Yulianti
- Lindaweni Fanetri
- Greysia Polii
- Nitya Krishinda Maheswari
- Shendy Puspa Irawati
- Meiliana Jauhari
- Lilyana Natsir
- Anneke Feinya Agustin

=== Japan ===
Men

- Kenichi Tago
- Kazushi Yamada
- Sho Sasaki
- Shoji Sato
- Hiroyuki Endo
- Kenta Kazuno
- Kenichi Hayakawa
- Hirokatsu Hashimoto
- Noriyasu Hirata
- Yoshiteru Hirobe

Women

- Eriko Hirose
- Ai Goto
- Sayaka Sato
- Yu Hirayama
- Mizuki Fujii
- Reika Kakiiwa
- Mami Naito
- Shizuka Matsuo
- Miyuki Maeda
- Satoko Suetsuna

=== South Korea ===
Men

- Park Sung-hwan
- Shon Wan-ho
- Hong Ji-hoon
- Lee Hyun-il
- Shin Baek-cheol
- Ko Sung-hyun
- Yoo Yeon-seong
- Jung Jae-sung
- Kim Ki-jung
- Cho Gun-woo

Women

- Bae Seung-hee
- Sung Ji-hyun
- Bae Youn-joo
- Lee Yun-hwa
- Jung Kyung-eun
- Ha Jung-eun
- Kim Min-jung
- Jang Ye-na
- Lee Hyo-jung
- Lee Kyung-won

=== Malaysia ===
Men

- Lee Chong Wei
- Wong Choong Hann
- Muhammad Hafiz Hashim
- Tan Chun Seang
- Koo Kien Keat
- Tan Boon Heong
- Mohd Fairuzizuan Mohd Tazari
- Mohd Zakry Abdul Latif
- Hoon Thien How
- Ong Soon Hock

Women

- Wong Mew Choo
- Sannatasah Saniru (replacing an injured Julia Wong Pei Xian)
- Sonia Cheah Su Ya (replacing an injured Lydia Cheah Li Ya)
- Tee Jing Yi
- Chin Eei Hui
- Wong Pei Tty
- Woon Khe Wei
- Vivian Hoo Kah Mun
- Goh Liu Ying
- Ng Hui Lin

== Teams with Thomas Cup squad only ==
=== Nigeria ===
- Olaoluwa Fagbemi
- Jinkam Ifraimu
- Eneojo Abah
- Ibrahim Adamu
- Ocholi Edicha
- Victor Makanju

=== Peru ===
- Antonio De Vinatea
- Andres Corpancho
- Mario Cuba
- Bruno Monteverde
- Martin Del Valle
- Rodrigo Pacheco

=== Poland ===
- Przemysław Wacha
- Michał Rogalski
- Hubert Pączek
- Rafał Hawel
- Michał Łogosz
- Robert Mateusiak
- Adam Cwalina
- Łukasz Moreń
- Wojciech Szkudlarczyk

== Teams with Uber Cup squad only ==
=== Russia ===
- Ella Diehl
- Tatjana Bibik
- Anastasia Prokopenko
- Olga Golovanova
- Ksenia Polikarpova
- Natalia Perminova
- Nina Vislova
- Valeria Sorokina
- Anastasia Russkikh

=== South Africa ===
- Kerry-Lee Harrington
- Stacey Doubell
- Jade Morgan
- Michelle Edwards

=== United States ===
- Rena Wang
- Iris Wang
- Eva Lee
- Chen Keui-Ya
- Cee Nantana Ketpura
- Priscilla Lun
- Mesinee Mangkalakiri
