= 2008 Thomas & Uber Cup squads =

This article listed the confirmed squads lists for 2008 Thomas & Uber Cup between May 11 and May 18, 2008.

== Teams with Thomas and Uber Cup squads ==
=== China ===
Men

- Lin Dan
- Bao Chunlai
- Chen Jin
- Chen Yu
- Cai Yun
- Fu Haifeng
- Xie Zhongbo
- Guo Zhendong
- He Hanbin
- Shen Ye

Women

- Xie Xingfang
- Lu Lan
- Zhu Lin
- Jiang Yanjiao
- Yang Wei
- Zhang Jiewen
- Wei Yili
- Zhang Yawen
- Gao Ling
- Zhao Tingting

=== Denmark ===
Men

- Kenneth Jonassen
- Peter Gade
- Joachim Persson
- Jan Ø. Jørgensen
- Jonas Rasmussen
- Lars Paaske
- Jens Eriksen
- Martin Lundgaard Hansen
- Carsten Mogensen
- Mathias Boe

Women

- Tine Rasmussen
- Camilla Sorensen
- Nanna Brosolat Jansen
- Mie Schjott Kristensen
- Marie Ropke
- Lena Frier Kristiansen
- Kamilla Rytter Juhl
- Helle Nielsen
- Christinna Pedersen
- Line Damkjær Kruse

=== Germany ===
Men

- Marc Zwiebler
- Roman Spitko
- Dieter Domke
- Sven Eric Kastens
- Marcel Reuter
- Michael Fuchs
- Ingo Kindervater
- Kristof Hopp
- Tim Dettmann
- Johannes Schoettler

Women

- Xu Huaiwen
- Juliane Schenk
- Janet Köhler
- Carola Bott
- Karin Schnaase
- Nicole Grether
- Carina Mette
- Birgit Overzier
- Michaela Peiffer
- Kathrin Piotrowski

=== Japan ===
Men

- Shoji Sato
- Sho Sasaki
- Kenichi Tago
- Hiroyuki Endo
- Keita Masuda
- Tadashi Ohtsuka
- Shuichi Sakamoto
- Shintaro Ikeda
- Keishi Kawaguchi
- Naoki Kawamae

Women

- Eriko Hirose
- Kaori Mori
- Yu Hirayama
- Kaori Imabeppu
- Kumiko Ogura
- Reiko Shiota
- Satoko Suetsuna
- Miyuki Maeda
- Tomomi Matsuda
- Mami Naito

=== Korea ===
Men

- Park Sung-hwan
- Lee Hyun-il
- Shon Seung-mo
- Hong Ji-hoon
- Lee Jae-jin
- Jung Jae-sung
- Hwang Ji-man
- Lee Yong-dae

Women

- Hwang Hye-youn
- Lee Yun-hwa
- Jang Soo-young
- Bae Youn-joo
- Lee Kyung-won
- Lee Hyo-jung
- Kim Min-jung
- Ha Jung-eun

Jun Jae-youn withdrew due to injury

=== Malaysia ===
Men

- Lee Chong Wei
- Wong Choong Hann
- Muhammad Hafiz Hashim
- Mohd Arif Abdul Latif
- Choong Tan Fook
- Lee Wan Wah
- Koo Kien Keat
- Tan Boon Heong
- Mohd Fairuzizuan Mohd Tazari
- Mohd Zakry Abdul Latif

Women

- Wong Mew Choo
- Julia Wong Pei Xian
- Lydia Cheah Li Ya
- Tee Jing Yi
- Chin Eei Hui
- Wong Pei Tty
- Lim Pek Siah
- Ng Hui Lin
- Chong Sook Chin
- Woon Khe Wei

=== Indonesia ===
Men

- Sony Dwi Kuncoro
- Taufik Hidayat
- Simon Santoso
- Tommy Sugiarto
- Markis Kido
- Hendra Setiawan
- Joko Riyadi
- Hendra Aprida Gunawan
- Candra Wijaya
- Nova Widianto

Women

- Maria Kristin Yulianti
- Adriyanti Firdasari
- Pia Zebadiah
- Fransisca Ratnasari
- Lilyana Natsir
- Vita Marissa
- Greysia Polii
- Jo Novita
- Rani Mundiasti
- Endang Nursugianti

=== New Zealand ===
Men

- John Moody
- Joe Wu
- Kevin Dennerly-Minturn
- Craig Cooper
- Henry Tam
- Nathan Hannam

Women

- Rachel Hindley
- Michelle Chan
- Jessica Jonggowisastro
- Danielle Barry
- Emma Rodgers
- Renee Flavell
- Donna Cranston

== Teams with Thomas Cup squads only ==
=== Canada ===
- Andrew Dabeka
- Bobby Milroy
- Stephan Wojcikiewicz
- David Snider
- Mike Beres
- William Milroy
- Toby Ng
- Alvin Lau

=== England ===
- Andrew Smith
- Rajiv Ouseph
- Nathan Rice
- Ben Beckman
- Dean George
- Chris Adcock
- Robert Adcock
- Chris Langridge
- Robin Middleton
- Andrew Ellis

=== Nigeria ===
- Greg Okuonghae
- Akeem Ogunseye
- Ibrahim Adamu
- Jimkan Bulus
- Ola Fagbemi
- Paul Fagbemi

=== Thailand ===
- Boonsak Ponsana
- Poompat Sapkulchananart
- Tanongsak Saensomboonsuk
- Pakkawat Vilailak
- Sudket Prapakamol
- Nuttaphon Narkthong
- Songphon Anugritayawon
- Tesana Panvisvas
- Nitipong Saengsila

== Teams with Uber Cup squads only ==
=== Hong Kong ===
- Wang Chen
- Yip Pui Yin
- Mong Kwan Yi
- Ng Ka Shun
- Tse Ying Suet
- Chan Hung Yung
- Fungying
- Chan Tsz Ka
- Chau Hoi Wah
- Koon Wai Chee

=== Netherlands ===
- Yao Jie
- Judith Meulendijks
- Rachel van Cutsen
- Karina de Wit
- Patty Stolzenbach
- Ginny Severien
- Wong Yik Man
- Eefje Muskens
- Ilse Vaessen
- Paulien van Dooremalen

=== South Africa ===
- Michelle Edwards
- Stacey Doubell
- Jade Morgan
- Chantal Botts
- Kerry-Lee Harrington
- Annari Viljoen

=== United States ===
- Eva Lee
- Lauren Todt
- Chen Kuei Ya
- Rena Wang
- Panita Phongasavithas
- Mesinee Mangkalakiri
- Vimla Phongasavithas
