= 2018 Badminton Asia Team Championships women's team squads =

This article lists the latest women's squads lists for badminton's 2018 Badminton Asia Team Championships.

== Group W ==
Group W consists of Japan, India and Hong Kong.

=== Japan ===
Name	DoB/Age	WS Rank	WD Rank
Akane Yamaguchi	6 June 1997 (aged 20)	2	-
Aya Ohori	2 October 1996 (aged 21)	15	-
Ayaka Takahashi	19 April 1990 (aged 27)	-	2
Koharu Yonemoto	7 December 1990 (aged 27)	-	6
Misaki Matsutomo	8 February 1992 (aged 25)	-	2
Nozomi Okuhara	13 March 1995 (aged 22)	7	-
Sayaka Hirota	1 August 1994 (aged 23)	-	4
Sayaka Sato	29 March 1991 (aged 26)	13	-
Shiho Tanaka	5 September 1992 (aged 25)	-	6
Yuki Fukushima	6 May 1993 (aged 24)	-	4

=== India ===
Name	DoB/Age	WS Rank	WD Rank
Ashwini Ponnappa	18 September 1989 (aged 28)	-	28
Gadde Ruthvika Shivani	26 March 1997 (aged 20)	82	-
Mithula U K	1 June 2000 (aged 17)	573	-
N. Sikki Reddy	18 August 1993 (aged 24)	-	28
Prajakta Sawant	28 October 1992 (aged 25)	-	109
P. V. Sindhu	5 July 1995 (aged 22)	3	-
Rutaparna Panda	7 May 1999 (aged 18)	-	573
Saina Nehwal	17 March 1990 (aged 27)	10	-
Sanyogita Ghorpade	5 November 1992 (aged 25)	-	109
Sri Krishna Priya Kudaravalli	28 October 1997 (aged 20)	58	-

=== Hong Kong ===
Name	DoB/Age	WS Rank	WD Rank
Cheung Ngan Yi	27 April 1993 (aged 24)	25	-
Cheung Ying Mei	4 April 1994 (aged 23)	375	-
Ng Tsz Yau	24 April 1998 (aged 19)	-	49
Ng Wing Yung	17 May 1995 (aged 22)	-	88
Poon Lok Yan	22 August 1991 (aged 26)	-	22
Wu Yi Ting	28 April 1996 (aged 21)	-	245
Yeung Nga Ting	13 October 1998 (aged 19)	-	49
Yeung Sum Yee	18 August 1999 (aged 18)	1006	-
Yip Pui Yin	6 August 1987 (aged 30)	30	-
Yuen Sin Ying	13 January 1994 (aged 24)	-	88

== Group X ==
Group X consists of Korea, Chinese Taipei and Maldives.

=== Korea ===
Name	DoB/Age	WS Rank	WD Rank
An Se-young	5 February 2002 (aged 16)	-	-
Baek Ha-na	22 September 2000 (aged 17)	-	66
Chang Ye-na	13 December 1989 (aged 28)	-	5
Jeon Joo-i	4 March 1995 (aged 22)	137	-
Kim Hye-rin	19 May 1995 (aged 22)	-	18
Lee Jang-mi	25 August 1994 (aged 23)	19	-
Lee So-hee	14 June 1994 (aged 23)	-	5
Lee Yu-rim	27 January 2000 (aged 18)	-	66
Shin Seung-chan	6 December 1994 (aged 23)	-	8
Sung Ji-hyun	29 July 1991 (aged 26)	6	-

=== Chinese Taipei ===
Name	DoB/Age	WS Rank	WD Rank
Chiang Kai-hsin	25 December 1990 (aged 27)	-	39
Chiang Mei-hui	13 April 1991 (aged 26)	39	-
Hsu Ya-ching	30 July 1991 (aged 26)	-	19
Hung Shih-han	18 January 1990 (aged 28)	-	39
Hung Yi-ting	4 May 1997 (aged 20)	-	477
Lee Chia-hsin	11 May 1997 (aged 20)	26	-
Lin Ying-chun	5 March 1994 (aged 23)	-	391
Pai Yu-po	18 April 1991 (aged 26)	27	-
Sung Shuo-yun	15 June 1997 (aged 20)	56	-
Wu Ti-jung	23 February 1993 (aged 24)	-	19

=== Maldives ===
Name	DoB/Age	WS Rank	WD Rank
Aminath Nabeeha Abdul Razzaq	13 June 1999 (aged 18)	523	345
Fathimath Nabaaha Abdul Razzaq	13 June 1999 (aged 18)	446	345
Maisa Fathuhulla Ismail	1 June 1999 (aged 18)	387	459
Moosa Aminath Shahurunaz	3 February 1995 (aged 23)	523	442
Nafha Nasrullah	30 September 1999 (aged 18)	649	459
Neela Najeeb	20 December 1984 (aged 33)	615	442

== Group Y ==
Group Y consists of Thailand, Malaysia, Vietnam and Philippines.

=== Thailand ===
Name	DoB/Age	WS Rank	WD Rank
Busanan Ongbamrungphan	22 March 1996 (aged 21)	23	-
Chayanit Chaladchalam	8 March 1991 (aged 26)	-	21
Nitchaon Jindapol	31 March 1991 (aged 26)	12	-
Nuntakarn Aimsaard	23 May 1999 (aged 18)	158	-
Pacharapun Chochuwong	29 January 1996 (aged 22)	-	60
Phataimas Muenwong	5 July 1995 (aged 22)	-	21
Pornpawee Chochuwong	22 January 1998 (aged 20)	18	-
Puttita Supajirakul	29 March 1996 (aged 21)	-	25
Sapsiree Taerattanachai	18 April 1992 (aged 25)	-	25
Savitree Amitrapai	19 November 1988 (aged 29)	-	60

=== Malaysia ===
Name	DoB/Age	WS Rank	WD Rank
Chow Mei Kuan	23 December 1994 (aged 23)	-	17
Goh Jin Wei	30 January 2000 (aged 18)	43	-
Goh Yea Ching	19 June 1996 (aged 21)	-	103
Lim Yin Fun	13 November 1994 (aged 23)	90	-
Selvaduray Kisona	1 October 1998 (aged 19)	78	-
Soniia Cheah	19 June 1993 (aged 24)	28	-
Tee Jing Yi	8 February 1991 (aged 26)	-	43
Vivian Hoo	19 March 1990 (aged 27)	-	14
Woon Khe Wei	18 March 1989 (aged 28)	-	14
Yap Cheng Wen	4 January 1995 (aged 23)	-	26

=== Vietnam ===
Name	DoB/Age	WS Rank	WD Rank
Đinh Thị Phương Hồng	23 February 1995 (aged 22)	490	230
Đỗ Thị Hoài	8 April 1996 (aged 21)	-	230
Nguyễn Thị Sen	16 February 1991 (aged 26)	649	93
Nguyễn Thùy Linh	20 November 1997 (aged 20)	67	297
Vũ Thị Trang	19 May 1992 (aged 25)	45	93

=== Philippines ===
Name	DoB/Age	WS Rank	WD Rank
Nicole Albo	15 March 1999 (aged 18)	830	674
Alyssa Geverjuan	2 March 1999 (aged 18)	-	674
Alyssa Leonardo	15 September 1997 (aged 20)	-	370
Sarah Barredo	17 October 1999 (aged 18)	273	895
Thea Pomar	25 January 1998 (aged 20)	-	370

== Group Z ==
Group Z consists of China, Indonesia and Singapore.

=== China ===
Name	DoB/Age	WS Rank	WD Rank
Cao Tongwei	13 February 1998 (aged 19)	-	-
Chen Xiaoxin	24 April 1998 (aged 19)	21	-
Chen Yufei	1 March 1998 (aged 19)	8	-
Dong Wenjing	15 June 1998 (aged 19)	-	-
Du Yue	15 February 1998 (aged 19)	-	33
Feng Xueying	19 December 1998 (aged 19)	-	-
Gao Fangjie	29 September 1998 (aged 19)	50	-
He Bingjiao	21 March 1997 (aged 20)	9	-
Li Yinhui	11 March 1997 (aged 20)	-	16
Zheng Yu	7 February 1996 (aged 21)	-	-

=== Indonesia ===
Name	DoB/Age	WS Rank	WD Rank
Anggia Shitta Awanda	22 May 1994 (aged 23)	-	15
Apriyani Rahayu	29 April 1998 (aged 19)	-	7
Della Destiara Haris	8 December 1992 (aged 25)	-	36
Fitriani	27 December 1996 (aged 21)	24	-
Gregoria Mariska Tunjung	11 August 1999 (aged 18)	37	-
Greysia Polii	11 August 1987 (aged 30)	-	7
Hanna Ramadini	21 February 1995 (aged 22)	33	-
Ni Ketut Mahadewi Istarani	12 September 1994 (aged 23)	-	15
Rizki Amelia Pradipta	1 September 1990 (aged 27)	-	50
Ruselli Hartawan	27 December 1997 (aged 20)	76	-

=== Singapore ===
Name	DoB/Age	WS Rank	WD Rank
Bernice Lim	19 March 2001 (aged 16)	-	-
Crystal Wong	2 August 1999 (aged 18)	-	68
Grace Chua	1 March 1996 (aged 21)	95	-
Ker'sara Koh	28 April 1998 (aged 19)	-	895
Liang Xiaoyu	11 January 1996 (aged 22)	182	-
Insyirah Khan	12 September 2001 (aged 16)	-	-
Ren-ne Ong	2 June 1997 (aged 20)	-	68
Sito Jia Rong	23 June 2000 (aged 17)	1216	-
Tan Wei Han	16 July 1993 (aged 24)	-	237
Yeo Jia Min	1 February 1999 (aged 19)	79	-
