= 2018 Badminton Asia Team Championships men's team squads =

This article lists the latest men's squads lists for badminton's 2018 Badminton Asia Team Championships.

== Group A ==
Group A consists of China, Hong Kong and Singapore.

=== China ===
Name	DoB/Age	MS Rank	MD Rank
Chai Biao	10 October 1990 (aged 27)	-	156
Han Chengkai	12 January 1998 (aged 20)	-	67
He Jiting	19 February 1998 (aged 19)	-	57
Lu Guangzu	19 October 1996 (aged 21)	254	-
Qiao Bin	17 November 1992 (aged 25)	35	-
Shi Yuqi	28 February 1996 (aged 21)	8	-
Tan Qiang	16 September 1998 (aged 19)	-	57
Wang Zekang	25 May 1994 (aged 23)	-	156
Zhao Junpeng	2 February 1996 (aged 22)	78	-
Zhou Haodong	20 February 1998 (aged 19)	-	67

=== Hong Kong ===
Name	DoB/Age	MS Rank	MD Rank
Chang Tak Ching	22 January 1995 (aged 23)	-	144
Law Cheuk Him	26 June 1994 (aged 23)	-	40
Lee Cheuk Yiu	28 August 1996 (aged 21)	43	-
Lee Chun Hei	25 January 1994 (aged 24)	-	40
Ng Ka Long	24 June 1994 (aged 23)	9	-
Or Chin Chung	26 October 1994 (aged 23)	-	28
Tang Chun Man	20 March 1995 (aged 22)	-	28
Wei Nan	4 January 1984 (aged 34)	51	-
Wong Wing Ki	18 March 1990 (aged 27)	14	-
Yeung Ming Nok	22 December 1995 (aged 22)	-	439

=== Singapore ===
Name	DoB/Age	MS Rank	MD Rank
Danny Bawa Chrisnanta	30 December 1988 (aged 29)	-	50
Terry Hee Yong Kai	6 July 1995 (aged 22)	-	61
Muhammad Imran Khan	29 July 1996 (aged 21)	1319	-
Joel Koh Jia Wei	23 November 2000 (aged 17)	961	-
Lee Jian Liang	19 January 1998 (aged 20)	-	157
Loh Kean Yew	26 June 1997 (aged 20)	226	-
Ryan Ng Zin Rei	14 January 1998 (aged 20)	104	-
Dominic Soh Shi Xuan	23 February 1997 (aged 20)	373	-
Muhammad Elaf Wei Tan	14 March 1998 (aged 19)	339	-
Jason Wong Guang Liang	3 August 1997 (aged 20)	-	157

== Group B ==
Group B consists of Japan, Korea, Nepal and Kazakhstan.

=== Japan ===
Name	DoB/Age	MS Rank	MD Rank
Hiroyuki Endo	16 December 1986 (aged 31)	-	30
Takuro Hoki	14 August 1995 (aged 22)	-	18
Takeshi Kamura	14 February 1990 (aged 27)	-	5
Yugo Kobayashi	10 July 1995 (aged 22)	-	18
Kento Momota	1 September 1994 (aged 23)	50	-
Kenta Nishimoto	30 August 1994 (aged 23)	20	-
Kazumasa Sakai	13 February 1990 (aged 27)	21	-
Keigo Sonoda	20 February 1990 (aged 27)	-	5
Kanta Tsuneyama	21 June 1996 (aged 21)	27	-
Yuta Watanabe	13 June 1997 (aged 20)	-	30

=== Korea ===
Name	DoB/Age	MS Rank	MD Rank
Choi Sol-gyu	5 August 1995 (aged 22)	-	88
Chung Eui-seok	28 November 1989 (aged 28)	-	29
Heo Kwang-hee	11 August 1995 (aged 22)	136	-
Jeon Hyeok-jin	13 June 1995 (aged 22)	19	-
Kang Min-hyuk	17 February 1999 (aged 18)	-	161
Kim Duk-young	12 September 1991 (aged 26)	-	29
Kim Won-ho	2 June 1999 (aged 18)	-	35
Lee Dong-keun	20 November 1990 (aged 27)	33	-
Seo Seung-jae	4 September 1997 (aged 20)	-	35
Son Wan-ho	17 May 1988 (aged 29)	5	-

=== Nepal ===
Name	DoB/Age	MS Rank	MD Rank
Dipesh Dhami	18 January 1997 (aged 21)	443	257
Bikash Shrestha	13 June 1986 (aged 31)	1638	1004
Ratnajit Tamang	1 January 1993 (aged 25)	257	257
Sajan Krishna Tamrakar	17 November 1992 (aged 25)	599	715

=== Kazakhstan ===
Name	DoB/Age	MS Rank	MD Rank
Khaitmurat Kulmatov	19 February 1996 (aged 21)	1636	715
Artur Niyazov	30 August 1993 (aged 24)	1180	715
Askar Ormanov	17 August 1980 (aged 37)	-	-
Dmitriy Panarin	8 January 2000 (aged 18)	1092	-
Ikramzhan Yuldashev	30 September 1999 (aged 18)	-	-
Samat Yerzhakanov		-	-

== Group C ==
Group C consists of Chinese Taipei, Malaysia, Thailand and Myanmar.

=== Chinese Taipei ===
Name	DoB/Age	MS Rank	MD Rank
Chen Chun-wei	24 April 1997 (aged 20)	193	-
Chen Hung-ling	10 February 1986 (aged 31)	-	8
Hsu Jen-hao	26 October 1991 (aged 26)	26	-
Lee Jhe-huei	20 March 1994 (aged 23)	-	7
Lee Yang	12 August 1995 (aged 22)	-	7
Lin Yu-hsien	27 September 1991 (aged 26)	53	-
Lu Ching-yao	7 June 1993 (aged 24)	-	13
Wang Chi-lin	18 January 1995 (aged 23)	-	8
Wang Tzu-wei	27 February 1995 (aged 22)	11	-
Yang Po-han	12 March 1994 (aged 23)	-	13

=== Malaysia ===
Name	DoB/Age	MS Rank	MD Rank
Goh Sze Fei	18 August 1997 (aged 20)	-	56
Goh V Shem	20 May 1989 (aged 28)	-	16
Nur Izzuddin	11 November 1997 (aged 20)	-	56
Lee Chong Wei	21 October 1982 (aged 35)	2	-
Lee Zii Jia	29 March 1998 (aged 19)	48	-
Ong Yew Sin	30 January 1995 (aged 23)	-	23
Soong Joo Ven	19 May 1995 (aged 22)	64	-
Tan Wee Kiong	21 May 1989 (aged 28)	-	16
Teo Ee Yi	4 April 1993 (aged 24)	-	23
Iskandar Zulkarnain	24 May 1991 (aged 26)	85	-

=== Thailand ===
Name	DoB/Age	MS Rank	MD Rank
Inkarat Apisuk	7 April 1993 (aged 24)	-	111
Suppanyu Avihingsanon	24 October 1989 (aged 28)	36	-
Tinn Isriyanet	7 July 1993 (aged 24)	-	45
Maneepong Jongjit	21 March 1991 (aged 26)	-	163
Kittinupong Kedren	19 July 1996 (aged 21)	-	25
Kittisak Namdash	4 August 1995 (aged 22)	-	45
Khosit Phetpradab	8 July 1994 (aged 23)	28	-
Dechapol Puavaranukroh	20 May 1997 (aged 20)	-	25
Pannawit Thongnuam	24 December 1995 (aged 22)	61	-
Kantaphon Wangcharoen	18 September 1998 (aged 19)	59	-

=== Myanmar ===
Name	DoB/Age	MS Rank	MD Rank
Arkar Phone Myat	26 December 1999 (aged 18)	1342	1004
Aung Myo Htoo	10 October 2001 (aged 16)	1342	-
Chan Win Oo	15 May 1997 (aged 20)	1915	792
Hein Si Thu Toe	5 November 1999 (aged 18)	-	1004
Phone Pyae Naing	29 March 1998 (aged 19)	480	371
Tint Thiha Maung	15 April 1998 (aged 19)	-	-

== Group D ==
Group D consists of Indonesia, India, Philippines and Maldives.

=== Indonesia ===
Name	DoB/Age	MS Rank	MD Rank
Mohammad Ahsan	7 September 1987 (aged 30)	-	14
Jonatan Christie	15 September 1997 (aged 20)	13	-
Marcus Fernaldi Gideon	9 March 1991 (aged 26)	-	1
Anthony Sinisuka Ginting	11 May 1996 (aged 21)	9	-
Firman Abdul Kholik	11 August 1997 (aged 20)	82	-
Ihsan Maulana Mustofa	18 November 1995 (aged 22)	39	-
Angga Pratama	12 May 1991 (aged 26)	-	17
Rian Agung Saputro	25 June 1990 (aged 27)	-	14
Hendra Setiawan	25 August 1984 (aged 33)	-	23
Kevin Sanjaya Sukamuljo	2 August 1996 (aged 21)	-	1

=== India ===
Name	DoB/Age	MS Rank	MD Rank
Arjun M.R.	11 May 1997 (aged 20)	-	41
B. Sai Praneeth	10 August 1992 (aged 25)	15	-
B. Sumeeth Reddy	26 September 1991 (aged 26)	-	33
Chirag Shetty	4 July 1997 (aged 20)	-	32
H. S. Prannoy	17 July 1992 (aged 25)	10	-
Manu Attri	31 December 1992 (aged 25)	-	33
Ramchandran Shlok	10 March 1995 (aged 22)	-	41
Sameer Verma	22 October 1994 (aged 23)	30	-
Satwiksairaj Rankireddy	13 August 2000 (aged 17)	-	32
Srikanth Kidambi	7 February 1993 (aged 24)	3	-

=== Philippines ===
Name	DoB/Age	MS Rank	MD Rank
Alvin Morada	12 April 1997 (aged 20)	-	1483
Carlos Antonie Cayanan	17 April 1995 (aged 22)	-	154
Lanz Ralf Zafra	8 September 2001 (aged 16)	-	-
Peter Gabriel Magnaye	9 April 1992 (aged 25)	-	183
Philip Joper Escueta	23 August 1993 (aged 24)	-	154
Ros Leonard Pedrosa	6 July 1996 (aged 21)	438	-
Solomon Jr. Padiz	13 November 2000 (aged 17)	-	-

=== Maldives ===
Name	DoB/Age	MS Rank	MD Rank
Ahmed Nibal	10 June 2002 (aged 15)	604	1005
Hassan Afsheen Shaheem	4 August 1983 (aged 34)	1641	-
Hussein Zayan Shaheed	30 May 1993 (aged 24)	531	969
Mohamed Aakif	6 December 1998 (aged 19)	-	-
Mohamed Arsalaan Ali	31 March 2002 (aged 15)	1918	1005
Mohamed Sarim	10 January 1987 (aged 31)	1319	969
