= 2017 Sudirman Cup squads =

This article lists the confirmed squads lists for badminton's 2017 Sudirman Cup.

== Group 1A ==
=== China ===
Name	DoB/Age	MS Rank	WS Rank	MD Rank	WD Rank	XD Rank
Bao Yixin	29 September 1992 (aged 24)	-	-	-	17	95
Chen Long	18 January 1989 (aged 28)	8	-	-	-	-
Chen Qingchen	23 June 1997 (aged 19)	-	-	-	5	1
Chen Yufei	1 March 1998 (aged 19)	-	11	-	-	-
Fu Haifeng	2 January 1984 (aged 33)	-	-	26	-	-
He Bingjiao	21 March 1997 (aged 20)	-	7	-	-	-
Huang Dongping	20 January 1995 (aged 22)	-	-	-	7	20
Huang Yaqiong	28 February 1994 (aged 23)	-	-	-	18	2
Jia Yifan	29 June 1997 (aged 19)	-	-	-	5	552
Li Junhui	10 May 1995 (aged 22)	-	-	3	-	167
Li Yinhui	11 March 1997 (aged 20)	-	-	-	7	4
Lin Dan	14 October 1983 (aged 33)	7	-	-	-	-
Liu Yuchen	25 July 1995 (aged 21)	-	-	3	-	108
Lu Kai	10 April 1992 (aged 25)	-	-	51	-	2
Shi Yuqi	28 February 1996 (aged 21)	5	-	-	-	-
Sun Yu	28 February 1994 (aged 23)	-	6	-	-	-
Tang Jinhua	8 January 1992 (aged 25)	-	-	-	18	108
Zhang Nan	1 March 1990 (aged 27)	-	-	15	-	4
Zheng Siwei	26 February 1997 (aged 20)	-	-	51	-	1

=== Thailand ===
Name	DoB/Age	MS Rank	WS Rank	MD Rank	WD Rank	XD Rank
Savitree Amitrapai	19 November 1988 (aged 28)	-	-	-	318	21
Suppanyu Avihingsanon	24 October 1989 (aged 27)	54	-	-	-	-
Pornpawee Chochuwong	22 January 1998 (aged 19)	-	20	-	-	-
Ratchanok Intanon	5 February 1995 (aged 22)	-	8	-	-	-
Bodin Issara	12 December 1990 (aged 26)	-	-	13	-	21
Nichaon Jindapon	31 March 1991 (aged 26)	-	14	-	-	-
Kittinupong Kedren	19 July 1996 (aged 20)	-	-	23	-	-
Jongkolphan Kititharakul	1 March 1993 (aged 24)	-	-	-	11	27
Adulrach Namkul	11 February 1997 (aged 20)	138	-	-	-	-
Busanan Ongbamrungphan	22 March 1996 (aged 21)	-	13	-	-	-
Khosit Phetpradab	8 July 1994 (aged 22)	46	-	-	-	-
Trawut Potieng	27 April 1991 (aged 26)	-	-	53	-	-
Rawinda Prajongjai	29 June 1993 (aged 23)	-	-	-	11	357
Nipitphon Puangpuapech	31 May 1991 (aged 25)	-	-	13	-	27
Dechapol Puavaranukroh	20 May 1997 (aged 20)	-	-	23	-	9
Tanongsak Saensomboonsuk	13 October 1990 (aged 26)	11	-	-	-	-
Puttita Supajirakul	29 March 1996 (aged 21)	-	-	-	10	84
Sapsiree Taerattanachai	18 April 1992 (aged 25)	-	-	-	10	9
Nanthakarn Yordphaisong	23 September 1993 (aged 23)	-	-	53	-	357

=== Hong Kong ===
Name	DoB/Age	MS Rank	WS Rank	MD Rank	WD Rank	XD Rank
Chau Hoi Wah	5 June 1986 (aged 30)	-	-	-	-	12
Cheung Ngan Yi	27 April 1993 (aged 24)	-	16	-	-	-
Fan Ka Yan	27 January 1997 (aged 20)	-	278	-	158	-
Hu Yun	31 August 1981 (aged 35)	14	-	-	-	-
Law Cheuk Him	26 February 1994 (aged 23)	-	-	28	-	395
Lee Cheuk Yiu	28 August 1996 (aged 20)	66	-	-	-	-
Lee Chun Hei	25 January 1994 (aged 23)	-	-	28	-	12
Ng Ka Long Angus	24 June 1994 (aged 22)	10	-	-	-	-
Ng Tsz Yau	24 April 1998 (aged 19)	-	-	-	47	42
Or Chin Chung	26 October 1994 (aged 22)	-	-	24	-	-
Poon Lok Yan	22 August 1991 (aged 25)	-	-	-	39	1038
Tang Chun Man	20 March 1995 (aged 22)	-	-	24	-	15
Tse Ying Suet	9 November 1991 (aged 25)	-	-	-	39	15
Wong Wing Ki	18 March 1990 (aged 27)	12	-	-	-	-
Yeung Nga Ting	13 October 1998 (aged 18)	-	-	-	47	98
Yip Pui Yin	6 August 1987 (aged 29)	-	27	-	-	-

== Group 1B ==
=== Korea ===
Name	DoB/Age	MS Rank	WS Rank	MD Rank	WD Rank	XD Rank
Chae Yoo-jung	9 May 1995 (aged 22)	-	-	-	44	14
Chang Ye-na	13 December 1989 (aged 27)	-	-	-	3	68
Choi Sol-gyu	5 August 1995 (aged 21)	-	-	80	-	14
Jeon Hyeok-jin	13 June 1995 (aged 21)	41	-	-	-	-
Jung Kyung-eun	20 March 1990 (aged 27)	-	-	-	4	-
Kim Duk-young	12 September 1991 (aged 25)	-	-	70	-	114
Kim Ga-eun	7 February 1998 (aged 19)	-	124	-	-	-
Kim Ha-na	27 December 1989 (aged 27)	-	-	-	93	3
Kim Won-ho	2 June 1999 (aged 17)	-	-	307	-	187
Lee Dong-keun	20 November 1990 (aged 26)	42	-	-	-	-
Lee Jang-mi	25 August 1994 (aged 22)	-	40	-	-	-
Lee So-hee	14 June 1994 (aged 22)	-	-	-	3	85
Park Kyung-hoon	12 January 1998 (aged 19)	-	-	208	-	293
Seo Seung-jae	4 September 1997 (aged 19)	244	-	-	-	-
Son Wan-ho	17 May 1988 (aged 29)	2	-	-	-	-
Sung Ji-hyun	29 July 1991 (aged 25)	-	5	-	-	-

=== Chinese Taipei ===
Name	DoB/Age	MS Rank	WS Rank	MD Rank	WD Rank	XD Rank
Chang Ching-hui	17 May 1996 (aged 21)	-	-	-	81	129
Chen Hung-ling	10 February 1986 (aged 31)	-	-	12	-	357
Chiang Mei-hui	13 April 1991 (aged 26)	-	28	-	116	1038
Chou Tien-chen	8 January 1990 (aged 27)	6	-	-	-	-
Hsu Ya-ching	30 July 1991 (aged 25)	-	25	-	21	36
Hu Ling-fang	4 June 1998 (aged 18)	-	113	-	46	40
Lee Chia-hsin	11 May 1997 (aged 20)	-	31	-	-	28
Lee Jhe-huei	20 March 1994 (aged 23)	-	-	10	-	203
Lee Yang	12 August 1995 (aged 21)	-	-	10	-	36
Tai Tzu-ying	20 June 1994 (aged 22)	-	1	-	-	-
Tseng Min-hao	15 June 1988 (aged 28)	-	-	90	-	40
Wang Chi-lin	18 January 1995 (aged 22)	-	-	12	-	28
Wang Tzu-wei	27 February 1995 (aged 22)	21	-	-	-	-
Wu Ti-jung	23 February 1993 (aged 24)	-	-	-	21	34
Yang Ching-tun	17 November 1995 (aged 21)	-	-	-	81	246

=== Russia ===
Name	DoB/Age	MS Rank	WS Rank	MD Rank	WD Rank	XD Rank
Rodion Alimov	21 April 1998 (aged 19)	332	-	123	-	81
Ekaterina Bolotova	12 December 1992 (aged 24)	-	312	-	92	293
Alina Davletova	18 July 1998 (aged 18)	-	-	-	92	81
Evgenia Dimova	29 April 1982 (aged 35)	-	-	-	306	24
Evgenij Dremin	24 February 1981 (aged 36)	-	-	42	-	24
Denis Grachev	18 January 1992 (aged 25)	151	-	42	-	329
Vladimir Ivanov	3 July 1987 (aged 29)	-	-	14	-	217
Evgeniya Kosetskaya	16 November 1994 (aged 22)	-	42	-	203	70
Anastasiia Semenova	12 March 1999 (aged 18)	-	171	-	176	1016
Sergey Sirant	12 April 1994 (aged 23)	72	-	325	-	-
Ivan Sozonov	6 July 1989 (aged 27)	-	-	14	-	1434
Nina Vislova	4 October 1986 (aged 30)	-	-	-	-	162

== Group 1C ==
=== Japan ===
Name	DoB/Age	MS Rank	WS Rank	MD Rank	WD Rank	XD Rank
Hiroyuki Endo	16 December 1986 (aged 30)	-	-	32	-	-
Arisa Higashino	1 August 1996 (aged 20)	-	-	-	86	22
Takuro Hoki	14 August 1995 (aged 21)	-	-	16	-	-
Yu Igarashi	15 May 1995 (aged 22)	103	-	-	-	-
Takeshi Kamura	14 February 1990 (aged 27)	-	-	6	-	-
Kenta Kazuno	25 November 1985 (aged 31)	-	-	-	-	13
Ayane Kurihara	27 September 1989 (aged 27)	-	-	-	86	13
Misaki Matsutomo	8 February 1992 (aged 25)	-	-	-	1	138
Kenta Nishimoto	30 August 1994 (aged 22)	63	-	-	-	-
Nozomi Okuhara	13 March 1995 (aged 22)	-	10	-	-	-
Keigo Sonoda	20 February 1990 (aged 27)	-	-	6	-	156
Ayaka Takahashi	19 April 1990 (aged 27)	-	-	-	1	-
Shiho Tanaka	5 September 1992 (aged 24)	-	-	-	8	-
Yuta Watanabe	13 June 1997 (aged 19)	-	-	32	-	22
Akane Yamaguchi	6 June 1997 (aged 19)	-	3	-	-	-
Koharu Yonemoto	7 December 1990 (aged 26)	-	-	-	8	102

=== Malaysia ===
Name	DoB/Age	MS Rank	WS Rank	MD Rank	WD Rank	XD Rank
Chan Peng Soon	27 April 1988 (aged 29)	-	-	-	-	10
Sonia Cheah Su Ya	19 June 1993 (aged 23)	-	35	-	-	-
Cheah Yee See	18 November 1995 (aged 21)	-	-	-	609	88
Chow Mei Kuan	23 December 1994 (aged 22)	-	-	-	25	-
Goh Jin Wei	30 January 2000 (aged 17)	-	30	-	-	-
Goh V Shem	20 May 1989 (aged 28)	-	-	4	-	-
Vivian Hoo Kah Mun	19 March 1990 (aged 27)	-	-	-	13	-
Lai Pei Jing	8 August 1992 (aged 24)	-	-	-	-	11
Lee Chong Wei	21 October 1982 (aged 34)	1	-	-	-	-
Lee Meng Yean	30 March 1994 (aged 23)	-	-	-	25	-
Lee Zii Jia	29 March 1998 (aged 19)	118	-	-	-	-
Ong Yew Sin	30 January 1995 (aged 22)	-	-	22	-	-
Tan Kian Meng	1 June 1994 (aged 22)	-	-	-	-	11
Tan Wee Kiong	21 May 1989 (aged 28)	-	-	4	-	-
Teo Ee Yi	4 April 1993 (aged 24)	-	-	22	-	-
Woon Khe Wei	18 March 1989 (aged 28)	-	-	-	13	-
Iskandar Zulkarnain Zainuddin	24 May 1991 (aged 25)	35	-	-	-	-

=== Germany ===
Name	DoB/Age	MS Rank	WS Rank	MD Rank	WD Rank	XD Rank
Raphael Beck	6 March 1992 (aged 25)	-	-	60	-	74
Fabienne Deprez	8 February 1992 (aged 25)	-	48	-	-	-
Linda Efler	23 January 1995 (aged 22)	-	-	-	140	75
Johanna Goliszewski	9 May 1986 (aged 31)	-	-	-	43	-
Luise Heim	24 March 1996 (aged 21)	-	76	-	-	-
Isabel Herttrich	17 March 1992 (aged 25)	-	-	-	35	33
Jones Ralfy Jansen	12 November 1992 (aged 24)	-	-	27	-	87
Eva Janssens	16 July 1996 (aged 20)	-	-	-	126	134
Lara Käpplein	25 May 1995 (aged 21)	-	-	-	43	297
Peter Käsbauer	17 March 1988 (aged 29)	-	-	60	-	-
Mark Lamsfuss	19 April 1994 (aged 23)	-	-	67	-	33
Yvonne Li	30 May 1998 (aged 18)	-	94	-	350	797
Fabian Roth	29 November 1995 (aged 21)	38	-	-	-	-
Marvin Emil Seidel	9 November 1995 (aged 21)	-	-	67	-	75
Josche Zurwonne	23 March 1989 (aged 28)	-	-	27	-	-
Marc Zwiebler	13 March 1984 (aged 33)	20	-	-	-	-

== Group 1D ==
=== Denmark ===
Name	DoB/Age	MS Rank	WS Rank	MD Rank	WD Rank	XD Rank
Anders Antonsen	27 April 1997 (aged 20)	17	-	-	-	-
Kim Astrup	6 March 1992 (aged 25)	-	-	9	-	37
Viktor Axelsen	4 January 1994 (aged 23)	3	-	-	-	-
Mia Blichfeldt	19 August 1997 (aged 19)	-	45	-	-	-
Mathias Boe	11 July 1980 (aged 36)	-	-	2	-	-
Mathias Christiansen	20 February 1994 (aged 23)	-	-	21	-	18
Mads Conrad-Petersen	12 January 1988 (aged 29)	-	-	7	-	-
Maiken Fruergaard	11 May 1995 (aged 22)	-	-	-	19	43
Jan Ø. Jørgensen	31 December 1987 (aged 29)	4	-	-	-	-
Line Kjaersfeldt	20 April 1994 (aged 23)	-	26	-	-	37
Natalia Koch Rohde	1 August 1995 (aged 21)	-	41	-	-	-
Carsten Mogensen	24 July 1983 (aged 33)	-	-	2	-	-
Joachim Fischer Nielsen	23 November 1978 (aged 38)	-	-	-	-	5
Christinna Pedersen	12 May 1986 (aged 31)	-	-	-	2	5
Mads Pieler Kolding	27 January 1988 (aged 29)	-	-	7	-	-
Kamilla Rytter Juhl	23 November 1983 (aged 33)	-	-	-	2	-
Anders Skaarup Rasmussen	15 February 1989 (aged 28)	-	-	9	-	136
Sara Thygesen	20 January 1991 (aged 26)	-	-	-	19	18
Hans-Kristian Vittinghus	16 January 1986 (aged 31)	18	-	-	-	-

=== Indonesia ===
Name	DoB/Age	MS Rank	WS Rank	MD Rank	WD Rank	XD Rank
Angga Pratama	5 December 1991 (aged 25)	-	-	8	-	-
Anggia Shitta Awanda	22 May 1994 (aged 22)	-	-	-	16	-
Anthony Sinisuka Ginting	20 October 1996 (aged 20)	23	-	-	-	-
Apriani Rahayu	29 April 1998 (aged 19)	-	-	-	139	400
Debby Susanto	3 May 1989 (aged 28)	-	-	-	-	8
Della Destiara Haris	8 December 1992 (aged 24)	-	-	-	15	-
Dinar Dyah Ayustine	18 October 1994 (aged 22)	-	33	-	-	-
Fitriani	27 December 1998 (aged 18)	-	23	-	-	-
Gloria Emanuelle Widjaja	28 November 1993 (aged 23)	-	-	-	-	73
Gregoria Mariska Tunjung	11 August 1999 (aged 17)	-	80	-	-	-
Greysia Polii	11 August 1987 (aged 29)	-	-	-	30	1223
Jonatan Christie	15 September 1997 (aged 19)	28	-	-	-	-
Kevin Sanjaya Sukamuljo	2 August 1996 (aged 20)	-	-	1	-	-
Marcus Fernaldi Gideon	9 March 1991 (aged 26)	-	-	1	-	-
Mohammad Ahsan	7 September 1987 (aged 29)	-	-	30	-	-
Praveen Jordan	26 April 1994 (aged 23)	-	-	-	-	8
Rian Agung Saputro	25 June 1990 (aged 26)	-	-	35	-	1223
Ricky Karanda Suwardi	21 January 1992 (aged 25)	-	-	8	-	-
Rosyita Eka Putri Sari	6 July 1996 (aged 20)	-	-	-	15	-
Tontowi Ahmad	18 July 1987 (aged 29)	-	-	-	-	7

=== India ===
Name	DoB/Age	MS Rank	WS Rank	MD Rank	WD Rank	XD Rank
Manu Attri	31 December 1992 (aged 24)	-	-	25	-	178
Sumeeth Reddy Buss	26 September 1991 (aged 25)	-	-	25	-	66
Pranav Chopra	6 September 1992 (aged 24)	-	-	652	-	16
Rituparna Das	2 October 1996 (aged 20)	-	49	-	-	-
Ajay Jayaram	28 September 1987 (aged 29)	13	-	-	-	-
Srikanth Kidambi	7 February 1993 (aged 24)	26	-	-	-	-
Maneesha Kukkapalli	29 April 1995 (aged 22)	-	-	-	120	62
Prannoy Kumar	17 July 1992 (aged 24)	30	-	-	-	-
Saina Nehwal	17 March 1990 (aged 27)	-	9	-	-	-
Sikki Reddy Nelakurthi	18 August 1993 (aged 23)	-	-	-	28	16
Ashwini Ponnappa	18 September 1989 (aged 27)	-	-	-	28	66
Satwiksairaj Rankireddy	13 August 2000 (aged 16)	-	-	46	-	62
Chirag Shetty	4 July 1997 (aged 19)	-	-	46	-	678
P. V. Sindhu	5 July 1995 (aged 21)	-	4	-	913	-
