= 2015 Sudirman Cup squads =

This article lists the confirmed squads lists for badminton's 2015 Sudirman Cup

== Group 1A ==
=== China ===
Name	DoB/Age	MS Rank	WS Rank	MD Rank	WD Rank	XD Rank
Bao Yixin	29 September 1992 (aged 22)	-	-	-	21	5
Cai Yun	19 January 1980 (aged 35)	-	-	16	-	-
Chai Biao	10 October 1990 (aged 24)	-	-	5	-	-
Chen Long	18 January 1989 (aged 26)	1	-	-	-	-
Fu Haifeng	23 August 1983 (aged 31)	-	-	8	-	-
Hong Wei	4 October 1989 (aged 25)	-	-	5	-	-
Li Xuerui	24 January 1991 (aged 24)	-	1	-	-	-
Lin Dan	14 October 1983 (aged 31)	2	-	-	-	-
Liu Cheng	4 January 1992 (aged 23)	-	-	43	-	5
Lu Kai	10 April 1992 (aged 23)	-	-	16	-	6
Ma Jin	7 May 1988 (aged 27)	-	-	-	19	2
Tang Yuanting	2 August 1994 (aged 20)	-	-	-	19	174
Wang Shixian	13 February 1990 (aged 25)	-	5	-	-	-
Wang Xiaoli	24 June 1989 (aged 25)	-	-	-	3	-
Wang Yihan	18 January 1988 (aged 27)	-	8	-	-	-
Wang Zhengming	16 February 1990 (aged 25)	6	-	-	-	-
Xu Chen	29 November 1984 (aged 30)	-	-	-	-	2
Yu Yang	7 April 1986 (aged 29)	-	-	-	3	-
Zhang Nan	1 March 1990 (aged 25)	-	-	8	-	1
Zhao Yunlei	25 August 1986 (aged 28)	-	-	-	2	1

=== Thailand ===
Name	DoB/Age	MS Rank	WS Rank	MD Rank	WD Rank	XD Rank
Wannawat Ampunsuwan	15 July 1993 (aged 21)	-	-	49	-	-
Duanganong Aroonkesorn	6 February 1984 (aged 31)	-	-	-	26	-
Suppanyu Avihingsanon	24 October 1989 (aged 25)	59	-	-	-	-
Porntip Buranaprasertsuk	24 October 1991 (aged 23)	-	19	-	-	-
Patiphat Chalardchaleam	9 July 1987 (aged 27)	-	-	49	-	1427
Ratchanok Intanon	5 February 1995 (aged 20)	-	6	-	-	-
Bodin Issara	12 December 1990 (aged 24)	-	-	337	-	-
Nichaon Jindapon	31 March 1991 (aged 24)	-	21	-	-	-
Jongkonphan Kittiharakul	1 March 1993 (aged 22)	-	-	-	33	289
Busanan Ongbumrungpan	22 March 1996 (aged 19)	-	18	-	-	-
Khosit Phetpradab	8 July 1994 (aged 20)	112	-	-	-	-
Boonsak Ponsana	22 February 1982 (aged 33)	30	-	-	-	-
Rawinda Prajongjai	29 June 1993 (aged 21)	-	-	-	33	-
Sudket Prapakamol	8 February 1980 (aged 35)	-	-	1378	-	15
Nipitphon Puangpuapech	31 May 1991 (aged 23)	-	-	27	-	38
Tanongsak Saensomboonsuk	13 October 1990 (aged 24)	19	-	-	-	-
Puttita Supajirakul	29 May 1996 (aged 18)	-	-	-	18	38
Sapsiree Taerattanachai	18 April 1992 (aged 23)	-	-	-	18	28
Pakkawat Vilailak	30 October 1988 (aged 26)	1134	-	276	-	424
Kunchala Voravichitchaikul	14 November 1984 (aged 30)	-	-	-	26	478

=== Germany ===
Name	DoB/Age	MS Rank	WS Rank	MD Rank	WD Rank	XD Rank
Fabienne Deprez	8 February 1992 (aged 23)	-	100	-	-	-
Dieter Domke	9 February 1987 (aged 28)	70	-	-	-	-
Linda Efler	23 January 1995 (aged 20)	-	-	-	165	94
Michael Fuchs	22 April 1982 (aged 33)	-	-	23	-	11
Johanna Goliszewski	9 May 1986 (aged 29)	-	-	-	24	258
Luise Heim	24 March 1996 (aged 19)	-	569	-	-	-
Isabel Herttrich	17 March 1992 (aged 23)	-	-	-	41	29
Fabian Holzer	28 July 1992 (aged 22)	-	-	57	-	200
Peter Käsbauer	17 March 1988 (aged 27)	-	-	175	-	29
Mark Lamsfuß	19 April 1994 (aged 21)	-	-	57	-	86
Yvonne Li	30 May 1998 (aged 16)	-	190	-	228	789
Birgit Michels	28 September 1984 (aged 30)	-	-	-	41	11
Carla Nelte	21 September 1990 (aged 24)	-	-	-	24	20
Fabian Roth	29 November 1995 (aged 19)	96	-	-	-	-
Karin Schnaase	14 February 1985 (aged 30)	-	31	-	-	-
Johannes Schöttler	27 August 1984 (aged 30)	-	-	23	-	258
Max Schwenger	28 April 1992 (aged 23)	-	-	26	-	20
Josche Zurwonne	23 March 1989 (aged 26)	-	-	26	-	467
Marc Zwiebler	13 March 1984 (aged 31)	20	-	-	-	-

== Group 1B ==
=== Japan ===
Name	DoB/Age	MS Rank	WS Rank	MD Rank	WD Rank	XD Rank
Hiroyuki Endo	16 December 1986 (aged 28)	-	-	6	-	-
Naoko Fukuman	3 March 1992 (aged 23)	-	-	-	32	138
Hirokatsu Hashimoto	18 December 1985 (aged 29)	-	-	13	-	68
Kenichi Hayakawa	5 April 1986 (aged 29)	-	-	6	-	19
Noriyasu Hirata	17 November 1983 (aged 31)	-	-	13	-	-
Reika Kakiiwa	19 July 1989 (aged 25)	-	-	-	6	1259
Takeshi Kamura	14 February 1990 (aged 25)	-	-	15	-	231
Kenta Kazuno	25 November 1985 (aged 29)	-	-	19	-	166
Ayane Kurihara	27 September 1989 (aged 25)	-	-	-	35	338
Miyuki Maeda	14 October 1985 (aged 29)	-	-	-	6	68
Misaki Matsutomo	8 February 1992 (aged 23)	-	-	-	1	19
Minatsu Mitani	4 September 1991 (aged 23)	-	17	-	-	-
Kento Momota	1 September 1994 (aged 20)	8	-	-	-	-
Nozomi Okuhara	13 March 1995 (aged 20)	-	10	-	-	-
Sho Sasaki	30 June 1982 (aged 32)	17	-	-	-	-
Keigo Sonoda	20 February 1990 (aged 25)	-	-	15	-	138
Ayaka Takahashi	19 April 1990 (aged 25)	-	-	-	1	-
Takuma Ueda	21 March 1989 (aged 26)	25	-	-	-	-
Akane Yamaguchi	6 June 1997 (aged 17)	-	12	-	-	-
Kurumi Yonao	1 December 1992 (aged 22)	-	-	-	32	424

=== Chinese Taipei ===
Name	DoB/Age	MS Rank	WS Rank	MD Rank	WD Rank	XD Rank
Chen Hsiao-huan	12 March 1987 (aged 28)	-	312	-	60	51
Chen Hung-ling	10 February 1986 (aged 29)	-	-	21	-	125
Chou Tien-chen	8 January 1990 (aged 25)	7	-	-	-	-
Hsieh Pei-chen	31 January 1988 (aged 27)	-	-	-	57	232
Hsu Jen-hao	26 October 1991 (aged 23)	24	-	-	-	-
Hsu Ya-ching	30 July 1991 (aged 23)	-	26	-	38	-
Lai Chia-wen	20 August 1985 (aged 29)	-	-	-	60	75
Lee Sheng-mu	3 October 1986 (aged 28)	-	-	4	-	-
Tai Tzu-ying	20 June 1994 (aged 20)	-	4	-	-	-
Tsai Chia-hsin	25 July 1982 (aged 32)	-	-	4	-	-
Tseng Min-hao	15 June 1988 (aged 26)	-	-	38	-	75
Wang Chi-lin	18 January 1995 (aged 20)	-	-	21	-	65
Wu Ti-jung	23 March 1993 (aged 22)	-	-	-	57	126

=== Russia ===
Name	DoB/Age	MS Rank	WS Rank	MD Rank	WD Rank	XD Rank
Ekaterina Bolotova	12 December 1992 (aged 22)	-	216	-	28	59
Evgenia Dimova	29 April 1982 (aged 33)	-	182	-	-	30
Evgenij Dremin	24 February 1981 (aged 34)	-	-	311	-	30
Vitalij Durkin	2 September 1979 (aged 35)	-	-	-	-	26
Vladimir Ivanov	3 July 1987 (aged 27)	120	-	12	-	77
Evgeniya Kosetskaya	16 November 1994 (aged 20)	-	77	-	28	39
Sergey Lunev	17 June 1982 (aged 32)	-	-	311	-	-
Vladimir Malkov	9 April 1986 (aged 29)	55	-	547	-	-
Natalia Perminova	14 November 1991 (aged 23)	-	52	-	-	1286
Ksenia Polikarpova	11 March 1990 (aged 25)	-	55	-	288	-
Ivan Sozonov	6 July 1989 (aged 25)	-	-	12	-	227
Nina Vislova	4 October 1986 (aged 28)	-	-	-	34	26

== Group 1C ==
=== Denmark ===
Name	DoB/Age	MS Rank	WS Rank	MD Rank	WD Rank	XD Rank
Kim Astrup	6 March 1992 (aged 23)	-	-	14	-	-
Viktor Axelsen	4 January 1994 (aged 21)	9	-	-	-	-
Mathias Christiansen	20 February 1994 (aged 21)	-	-	41	-	54
Mads Conrad-Petersen	12 January 1988 (aged 27)	-	-	10	-	-
Maiken Fruergaard	11 May 1995 (aged 19)	-	-	-	64	177
Lena Grebak	18 September 1991 (aged 23)	-	-	-	63	54
Maria Helsbøl	17 September 1989 (aged 25)	-	-	-	63	338
Jan Ø. Jørgensen	31 December 1987 (aged 27)	3	-	-	-	-
Line Kjærsfeldt	20 April 1994 (aged 21)	-	39	-	921	-
Anna Thea Madsen	27 October 1994 (aged 20)	-	49	-	-	-
Mads Pieler Kolding	27 January 1988 (aged 27)	-	-	10	-	12
Anders Skaarup Rasmussen	15 February 1989 (aged 26)	-	-	14	-	-
Sara Thygesen	20 January 1991 (aged 24)	-	-	-	64	33
Hans-Kristian Vittinghus	16 January 1986 (aged 29)	14	-	-	-	-

=== Indonesia ===
Name	DoB/Age	MS Rank	WS Rank	MD Rank	WD Rank	XD Rank
Tontowi Ahmad	18 July 1987 (aged 27)	-	-	-	-	3
Mohammad Ahsan	7 September 1987 (aged 27)	-	-	3	-	-
Anggia Shitta Awanda	22 May 1994 (aged 20)	-	-	-	65	-
Jonatan Christie	15 September 1997 (aged 17)	63	-	-	-	-
Lindaweni Fanetri	18 January 1990 (aged 25)	-	36	-	-	-
Marcus Fernaldi Gideon	9 March 1991 (aged 24)	939	-	25	-	122
Della Destiara Haris	8 December 1992 (aged 22)	-	-	-	82	187
Praveen Jordan	26 April 1993 (aged 22)	-	-	-	-	10
Firman Abdul Kholik	11 August 1997 (aged 17)	71	-	-	-	-
Nitya Krishinda Maheswari	16 December 1988 (aged 26)	-	-	-	7	785
Bellaetrix Manuputty	11 October 1988 (aged 26)	-	51	-	-	-
Ihsan Maulana Mustofa	18 November 1995 (aged 19)	87	-	-	-	-
Liliyana Natsir	9 September 1985 (aged 29)	-	-	-	-	3
Greysia Polii	11 August 1987 (aged 27)	-	-	-	7	112
Angga Pratama	5 December 1991 (aged 23)	-	-	18	-	-
Hanna Ramadini	21 February 1995 (aged 20)	-	58	-	-	-
Hendra Setiawan	25 August 1984 (aged 30)	-	-	3	-	-
Kevin Sanjaya Sukamuljo	2 August 1995 (aged 19)	-	-	60	-	112
Debby Susanto	3 May 1989 (aged 26)	-	-	-	-	10
Ricky Karanda Suwardi	21 January 1992 (aged 23)	-	-	18	-	-

=== England ===
Name	DoB/Age	MS Rank	WS Rank	MD Rank	WD Rank	XD Rank
Chris Adcock	27 April 1989 (aged 26)	-	-	93	-	7
Gabby Adcock	30 September 1990 (aged 24)	-	-	-	116	7
Chloe Birch	16 September 1995 (aged 19)	-	154	-	141	-
Fontaine Chapman	2 January 1990 (aged 25)	-	60	-	-	-
Andrew Ellis	21 January 1987 (aged 28)	-	-	39	-	-
Peter Mills	31 March 1988 (aged 27)	-	-	39	-	-
Matthew Nottingham	17 May 1992 (aged 22)	-	-	45	-	139
Heather Olver	15 March 1986 (aged 29)	-	-	-	30	119
Rajiv Ouseph	30 August 1986 (aged 28)	28	-	-	-	-
Toby Penty	12 August 1992 (aged 22)	90	-	-	-	-
Lauren Smith	26 September 1991 (aged 23)	-	-	-	30	-
Harley Towler	11 December 1992 (aged 22)	-	-	45	-	57

== Group 1D ==
=== Korea ===
Name	DoB/Age	MS Rank	WS Rank	MD Rank	WD Rank	XD Rank
Bae Youn-joo	26 October 1990 (aged 24)	-	13	-	-	-
Chae Yoo-jung	9 May 1995 (aged 20)	-	-	-	96	52
Jang Ye-na	13 December 1989 (aged 25)	-	-	-	12	37
Jung Kyung-eun	20 March 1990 (aged 25)	-	-	-	15	712
Kim Ha-na	17 December 1989 (aged 25)	-	-	-	15	8
Kim Ki-jung	14 August 1990 (aged 24)	-	-	9	-	91
Kim Sa-rang	22 August 1989 (aged 25)	-	-	9	-	-
Ko Sung-hyun	21 May 1987 (aged 27)	-	-	11	-	8
Lee Dong-keun	20 November 1990 (aged 24)	34	-	-	-	-
Lee So-hee	14 June 1993 (aged 21)	-	-	-	8	210
Lee Yong-dae	11 September 1988 (aged 26)	-	-	1	-	92
Shin Baek-cheol	19 October 1989 (aged 25)	-	-	11	-	37
Shin Seung-chan	6 December 1994 (aged 20)	-	-	-	8	91
Son Wan-ho	17 May 1988 (aged 26)	5	-	-	-	-
Sung Ji-hyun	29 July 1991 (aged 23)	-	7	-	-	-
Yoo Yeon-seong	19 August 1986 (aged 28)	-	-	1	-	58

=== India ===
Name	DoB/Age	MS Rank	WS Rank	MD Rank	WD Rank	XD Rank
Manu Attri	31 December 1992 (aged 22)	-	-	30	-	106
Aparna Balan	9 August 1986 (aged 28)	-	483	-	174	66
B. Sumeeth Reddy	9 August 1986 (aged 28)	-	-	30	-	359
Pranav Chopra	6 September 1992 (aged 22)	-	-	35	-	234
Akshay Dewalkar	2 July 1988 (aged 26)	-	-	35	-	60
Pradnya Gadre	17 October 1990 (aged 24)	-	-	-	43	60
Jwala Gutta	7 September 1983 (aged 31)	-	-	-	22	-
Srikanth Kidambi	7 February 1993 (aged 22)	4	-	-	-	-
Prannoy H. S.	17 July 1992 (aged 22)	15	-	-	-	-
Saina Nehwal	17 March 1990 (aged 25)	-	2	-	-	-
N. Sikki Reddy	18 August 1993 (aged 21)	-	-	-	43	67
Parupalli Kashyap	8 September 1986 (aged 28)	13	-	-	-	-
Ashwini Ponnappa	18 September 1989 (aged 25)	-	-	-	22	77
P. V. Sindhu	5 July 1995 (aged 19)	-	11	-	-	-
Arun Vishnu	2 August 1988 (aged 26)	-	-	94	-	66

=== Malaysia ===
Name	DoB/Age	MS Rank	WS Rank	MD Rank	WD Rank	XD Rank
Amelia Alicia Anscelly	26 April 1988 (aged 27)	-	-	-	25	541
Chan Peng Soon	27 April 1988 (aged 27)	-	-	-	-	64
Cheam June Wei	23 January 1997 (aged 18)	187	-	-	-	-
Chow Mei Kuan	23 December 1994 (aged 20)	-	-	-	146	47
Goh Liu Ying	30 May 1989 (aged 25)	-	-	-	-	70
Goh V Shem	20 May 1989 (aged 25)	-	-	29	-	-
Vivian Hoo	19 March 1990 (aged 25)	-	-	-	11	-
Lee Chong Wei	21 October 1982 (aged 32)	46	-	-	-	-
Lim Yin Fun	13 November 1994 (aged 20)	-	111	-	-	-
Mak Hee Chun	28 December 1990 (aged 24)	-	-	133	-	-
Tan Wee Kiong	21 May 1989 (aged 25)	-	-	29	-	-
Tee Jing Yi	8 February 1991 (aged 24)	-	56	-	-	-
Wong Fai Yin	13 August 1993 (aged 21)	-	-	-	-	47
Woon Khe Wei	18 March 1988 (aged 27)	-	-	-	11	-
