= 2016 Thomas & Uber Cup squads =

This article lists the confirmed squads lists for badminton's 2016 Thomas & Uber Cup.

== Thomas Cup ==
=== Group A ===
==== China ====
Name	DoB/Age	Singles Rank	Doubles Rank
Chen Long	18 January 1989 (aged 27)	1	-
Fu Haifeng	23 August 1983 (aged 32)	-	3
Hong Wei	4 October 1989 (aged 26)	-	5
Li Junhui	10 May 1995 (aged 21)	-	11
Lin Dan	14 October 1983 (aged 32)	3	-
Liu Yuchen	25 July 1995 (aged 20)	-	11
Qiao Bin	17 November 1992 (aged 23)	53	-
Tian Houwei	11 January 1992 (aged 24)	6	-
Zhang Nan	1 March 1990 (aged 26)	-	3
Zheng Siwei	26 February 1997 (aged 19)	-	54

==== Japan ====
Name	DoB/Age	Singles Rank	Doubles Rank
Hiroyuki Endo	16 December 1986 (aged 29)	-	7
Kenichi Hayakawa	5 April 1986 (aged 30)	-	7
Takuro Hoki	14 August 1995 (aged 20)	1370	45
Takeshi Kamura	14 February 1990 (aged 26)	-	16
Yugo Kobayashi	10 July 1995 (aged 20)	1092	45
Kazumasa Sakai	13 February 1990 (aged 26)	83	-
Sho Sasaki	30 June 1982 (aged 33)	27	-
Keigo Sonoda	20 February 1990 (aged 26)	-	16
Riichi Takeshita	28 July 1989 (aged 26)	97	-
Takuma Ueda	21 March 1989 (aged 27)	44	-

==== France ====
Name	DoB/Age	Singles Rank	Doubles Rank
Pierrick Cajot	18 April 1994 (aged 22)	227	-
Baptiste Careme	25 October 1985 (aged 30)	-	41
Jordan Corvee	24 March 1995 (aged 21)	-	89
Lucas Corvee	9 June 1993 (aged 22)	79	-
Lucas Claerbout	22 October 1992 (aged 23)	81	442
Bastian Kersaudy	6 September 1994 (aged 21)	-	50
Ronan Labar	3 May 1989 (aged 27)	-	41
Julien Maio	6 May 1994 (aged 22)	-	89
Gaetan Mittelheisser	26 July 1993 (aged 22)	-	50
Thomas Rouxel	26 May 1991 (aged 24)	69	-

==== Mexico ====
Name	DoB/Age	Singles Rank	Doubles Rank
Job Castillo	1 November 1992 (aged 23)	92	43
Ailton Correa	18 December 1999 (aged 16)	438	327
Luis Ramon Garrido	10 May 1996 (aged 20)	109	333
Andres Lopez	9 May 1992 (aged 24)	-	1360
Lino Muñoz	8 February 1991 (aged 25)	73	43
Francisco Trevino	27 February 1998 (aged 18)	667	327

=== Group B ===
==== Indonesia ====
Name	DoB/Age	Singles Rank	Doubles Rank
Mohammad Ahsan	7 September 1987 (aged 28)	-	2
Jonatan Christie	15 September 1997 (aged 18)	19	-
Markus Fernaldi Gideon	9 March 1991 (aged 25)	-	13
Anthony Sinisuka Ginting	20 October 1996 (aged 19)	23	-
Ihsan Maulana Mustofa	18 November 1995 (aged 20)	31	-
Angga Pratama	5 December 1991 (aged 24)	-	12
Hendra Setiawan	25 August 1984 (aged 31)	-	2
Tommy Sugiarto	31 May 1988 (aged 27)	8	-
Kevin Sanjaya Sukamuljo	2 August 1995 (aged 20)	-	13
Ricky Karanda Suwardi	21 January 1992 (aged 24)	-	12

==== India ====
Name	DoB/Age	Singles Rank	Doubles Rank
Manu Attri	31 December 1992 (aged 23)	-	20
Sai Praneeth Bhamidipati	10 August 1992 (aged 23)	34	-
Sumeeth Reddy Buss	26 September 1991 (aged 24)	-	20
Akshay Dewalkar	2 July 1988 (aged 27)	-	30
Ajay Jayaram	28 September 1987 (aged 28)	21	-
Satwiksairaj Rankireddy	13 August 2000 (aged 15)	-	169
Chirag Shetty	4 July 1997 (aged 18)	-	332
Sameer Verma	22 October 1994 (aged 21)	38	-
Sourabh Verma	30 December 1992 (aged 23)	180	-

==== Thailand ====
Name	DoB/Age	Singles Rank	Doubles Rank
Wannawat Ampunsuwan	15 July 1993 (aged 22)	-	53
Tinn Isriyanet	7 July 1993 (aged 22)	-	53
Bodin Issara	12 December 1990 (aged 25)	-	29
Kedren Kittinupong	19 July 1996 (aged 19)	-	31
Adulrach Namkul	2 November 1997 (aged 18)	200	-
Khosit Phetpradab	8 July 1994 (aged 21)	98	-
Boonsak Ponsana	22 February 1982 (aged 34)	20	-
Nipitphon Puangpuapech	31 May 1991 (aged 24)	-	29
Dechapol Puavaranukroh	20 May 1997 (aged 18)	-	31
Tanongsak Saensomboonsuk	13 October 1990 (aged 25)	26	-

==== Hong Kong ====
Name	DoB/Age	Singles Rank	Doubles Rank
Chan Tsz Kit	17 December 1991 (aged 24)	-	62
Hu Yun	31 August 1981 (aged 34)	14	-
Law Cheuk Him	26 February 1994 (aged 22)	-	62
Lee Chun Hei	25 January 1994 (aged 22)	-	66
Ng Ka Long	24 June 1994 (aged 21)	11	-
Or Chin Chung	26 October 1994 (aged 21)	-	48
Tang Chun Man	20 March 1995 (aged 21)	-	48
Wei Nan	4 January 1984 (aged 32)	17	-
Wong Wing Ki	18 March 1990 (aged 26)	22	-
Yeung Shing Choi	21 March 1996 (aged 20)	-	212

=== Group C ===
==== South Korea ====
Name	DoB/Age	Singles Rank	Doubles Rank
Heo Kwang-hee	11 August 1995 (aged 20)	84	-
Jeon Hyeok-jin	13 June 1995 (aged 20)	28	-
Kim Gi-jung	14 August 1990 (aged 25)	-	4
Kim Sa-rang	22 August 1989 (aged 26)	-	4
Ko Sung-hyun	21 May 1987 (aged 28)	-	6
Lee Dong-keun	20 November 1990 (aged 25)	16	-
Lee Yong-dae	11 September 1988 (aged 27)	-	1
Shin Baek-cheol	19 October 1989 (aged 26)	-	6
Son Wan-ho	17 May 1988 (aged 27)	9	-
Yoo Yeon-seong	19 August 1986 (aged 29)	-	1

==== Malaysia ====
Name	DoB/Age	Singles Rank	Doubles Rank
Chong Wei Feng	26 May 1987 (aged 28)	67	-
Goh Soon Huat	27 June 1990 (aged 25)	57	-
Goh V Shem	20 May 1989 (aged 26)	-	14
Koo Kien Keat	18 September 1985 (aged 30)	-	17
Lee Chong Wei	21 October 1982 (aged 33)	2	-
Ong Yew Sin	30 January 1995 (aged 21)	-	101
Tan Boon Heong	18 September 1987 (aged 28)	-	17
Tan Wee Kiong	21 May 1989 (aged 26)	-	14
Teo Ee Yi	4 April 1993 (aged 23)	-	101
Iskandar Zulkarnain Zainuddin	24 May 1991 (aged 24)	36	-

==== England ====
Name	DoB/Age	Singles Rank	Doubles Rank
Peter Briggs	23 February 1992 (aged 24)	-	52
Marcus Ellis	14 September 1989 (aged 26)	-	19
Alex Lane	29 August 1995 (aged 20)	174	1230
Chris Langridge	2 May 1985 (aged 31)	-	19
Matthew Nottingham	17 May 1992 (aged 23)	-	91
Rajiv Ouseph	30 August 1986 (aged 29)	15	-
Sam Parsons	23 August 1995 (aged 20)	126	409
Toby Penty	12 August 1992 (aged 23)	99	-
Harley Towler	11 December 1992 (aged 23)	-	91
Tom Wolfenden	23 February 1994 (aged 22)	-	52

==== Germany ====
Name	DoB/Age	Singles Rank	Doubles Rank
Richard Domke	27 March 1991 (aged 25)	1176	340
Fabian Holzer	28 July 1992 (aged 23)	-	119
Mark Lamsfuss	19 April 1994 (aged 22)	-	47
David Peng	6 February 1997 (aged 19)	426	-
Johannes Pistorius	16 June 1995 (aged 20)	-	119
Kai Schaefer	13 June 1993 (aged 22)	137	-
Lars Schaenzler	24 August 1995 (aged 20)	148	-
Marvin Emil Seidel	9 November 1995 (aged 20)	-	47
Josche Zurwonne	23 March 1989 (aged 27)	-	123
Marc Zwiebler	13 March 1984 (aged 32)	10	-

=== Group D ===
==== Denmark ====
Name	DoB/Age	Singles Rank	Doubles Rank
Viktor Axelsen	4 January 1994 (aged 22)	4	-
Mathias Boe	11 July 1980 (aged 35)	-	8
Mathias Christiansen	20 February 1994 (aged 22)	-	36
Mads Conrad-Petersen	12 January 1988 (aged 28)	-	9
Emil Holst	9 January 1991 (aged 25)	47	-
Jan Ø. Jørgensen	31 December 1987 (aged 28)	5	-
Mads Pieler Kolding	27 January 1988 (aged 28)	-	9
Anders Skaarup Rasmussen	15 February 1989 (aged 27)	-	23
Kim Astrup Sorensen	6 March 1992 (aged 24)	-	23
Hans-Kristian Vittinghus	16 January 1986 (aged 30)	13	-

==== Chinese Taipei ====
Name	DoB/Age	Singles Rank	Doubles Rank
Chen Hung-ling	10 February 1986 (aged 30)	-	21
Chou Tien-chen	8 January 1990 (aged 26)	7	-
Hsu Jen-hao	26 October 1991 (aged 24)	24	-
Lee Jhe-huei	20 March 1994 (aged 22)	-	32
Lee Sheng-mu	3 October 1986 (aged 29)	-	18
Lee Yang	12 August 1995 (aged 20)	-	32
Lin Yu-hsien	27 September 1991 (aged 24)	108	199
Tsai Chia-hsin	25 July 1982 (aged 33)	-	18
Wang Chi-lin	18 January 1995 (aged 21)	-	21
Wang Tzu-wei	27 February 1995 (aged 21)	41	246

==== New Zealand ====
Name	DoB/Age	Singles Rank	Doubles Rank
Kevin Dennerly-Minturn	18 May 1989 (aged 26)	-	191
Oliver Leydon-Davis	10 May 1990 (aged 26)	-	74
Asher Richardson	14 January 1993 (aged 23)	1494	-
Dylan Soedjasa	13 January 1995 (aged 21)	254	144
Niccolo Tagle	1 March 1997 (aged 19)	346	409

==== South Africa ====
Name	DoB/Age	Singles Rank	Doubles Rank
Cameron Coetzer	7 November 1995 (aged 20)	567	578
Andries Malan	20 October 1994 (aged 21)	-	51
Jacob Maliekal	1 January 1991 (aged 25)	78	1344
Willem Viljoen	5 March 1985 (aged 31)	-	51

== Uber Cup ==
=== Group A ===
==== China ====
Name	DoB/Age	Singles Rank	Doubles Rank
Chen Qingchen	23 June 1997 (aged 18)	-	12
Li Xuerui	24 January 1991 (aged 25)	3	-
Sun Yu	28 February 1994 (aged 22)	13	-
Tang Jinhua	8 January 1992 (aged 24)	-	24
Tang Yuanting	2 August 1994 (aged 21)	-	3
Tian Qing	19 August 1986 (aged 29)	-	4
Wang Shixian	13 February 1990 (aged 26)	6	-
Wang Yihan	18 January 1988 (aged 28)	4	-
Yu Yang	7 April 1986 (aged 30)	-	3
Zhao Yunlei	25 August 1986 (aged 29)	-	4

==== Denmark ====
Name	DoB/Age	Singles Rank	Doubles Rank
Mia Blichfeldt	19 August 1997 (aged 18)	81	-
Maiken Fruergaard	11 May 1995 (aged 21)	-	34
Line Kjaersfeldt	20 April 1994 (aged 22)	27	900
Anna Thea Madsen	27 October 1994 (aged 21)	44	-
Christinna Pedersen	12 May 1986 (aged 30)	-	5
Mette Poulsen	14 June 1993 (aged 22)	59	914
Natalia Koch Rohde	1 August 1995 (aged 20)	52	-
Kamilla Rytter Juhl	23 November 1983 (aged 32)	-	5
Sara Thygesen	20 January 1991 (aged 25)	-	34

==== Spain ====
Name	DoB/Age	Singles Rank	Doubles Rank
Clara Azurmendi	4 May 1998 (aged 18)	133	583
Beatriz Corrales	3 December 1992 (aged 23)	38	847
Carolina Marin	15 June 1993 (aged 22)	1	847
Laia Oset	6 November 1993 (aged 22)	297	538
Sara Penalver	26 August 1999 (aged 16)	914	-
Lorena Usle	16 February 1994 (aged 22)	-	-

==== Malaysia ====
Name	DoB/Age	Singles Rank	Doubles Rank
Amelia Alicia Anscelly	26 April 1988 (aged 28)	-	35
Sonia Cheah Su Ya	19 June 1993 (aged 22)	415	-
Chow Mei Kuan	23 December 1994 (aged 21)	-	93
Goh Jin Wei	30 January 2000 (aged 16)	55	379
Goh Liu Ying	30 May 1989 (aged 26)	-	-
Ho Yen Mei	29 April 1996 (aged 20)	80	-
Vivian Hoo Kah Mun	19 March 1990 (aged 26)	-	21
Lee Meng Yean	30 March 1994 (aged 22)	-	67
Tee Jing Yi	8 February 1991 (aged 25)	29	-
Woon Khe Wei	19 March 1989 (aged 27)	-	21

=== Group B ===
==== South Korea ====
Name	DoB/Age	Singles Rank	Doubles Rank
Bae Yeon-ju	26 October 1990 (aged 25)	14	-
Chang Ye-na	13 December 1989 (aged 26)	-	8
Go Ah-ra	21 September 1992 (aged 23)	-	13
Jung Kyung-eun	20 March 1990 (aged 26)	-	6
Kim Hyo-min	8 December 1995 (aged 20)	41	-
Lee Jang-mi	25 August 1994 (aged 21)	69	-
Lee So-hee	14 June 1994 (aged 21)	-	8
Shin Seung-chan	6 December 1994 (aged 21)	-	6
Sung Ji-hyun	29 July 1991 (aged 24)	7	-
Yoo Hae-won	7 November 1992 (aged 23)	-	13

==== Chinese Taipei ====
Name	DoB/Age	Singles Rank	Doubles Rank
Chen Hsiao-huan	12 March 1987 (aged 29)	92	68
Chiang Mei-hui	13 April 1991 (aged 25)	109	-
Hu Ling-fang	4 June 1998 (aged 17)	143	140
Huang Mei-ching		-	68
Hsieh Pei-chen	31 January 1986 (aged 30)	-	33
Hsu Ya-ching	30 July 1991 (aged 24)	28	37
Lee Chia-hsin	11 May 1997 (aged 19)	56	83
Pai Yu-po	18 April 1991 (aged 25)	23	37
Tai Tzu-ying	20 June 1994 (aged 21)	9	-
Wu Ti-jung	23 February 1993 (aged 23)	-	33

==== Mauritius ====
Name	DoB/Age	Singles Rank	Doubles Rank
Nicki Chan-Lam	4 November 1991 (aged 24)	252	914
Kate Foo Kune	29 March 1993 (aged 23)	67	131
Shania Leung	9 February 2002 (aged 14)	441	583
Yeldy Marie Louison	11 November 1991 (aged 24)	260	131

==== United States ====
Name	DoB/Age	Singles Rank	Doubles Rank
Crystal Pan	26 December 1998 (aged 17)	226	893
Jennie Gai	25 February 2001 (aged 15)	1231	-
Iris Wang	2 September 1994 (aged 21)	34	893
Annie Xu	22 October 1999 (aged 16)	1234	884
Kerry Xu	22 October 1999 (aged 16)	1229	884

=== Group C ===
==== Thailand ====
Name	DoB/Age	Singles Rank	Doubles Rank
Porntip Buranaprasertsuk	24 October 1991 (aged 24)	16	-
Chayanit Chaladchalam	8 March 1991 (aged 25)	-	30
Pornpawee Chochuwong	22 January 1998 (aged 18)	45	-
Ratchanok Intanon	5 February 1995 (aged 21)	2	-
Nitchaon Jindapol	31 March 1991 (aged 25)	25	-
Jongkolphan Kititharakul	1 March 1993 (aged 23)	-	20
Phataimas Muenwong	5 July 1995 (aged 20)	-	30
Busanan Ongbumrungphan	22 March 1996 (aged 20)	21	-
Rawinda Prajongjai	29 June 1993 (aged 22)	-	20
Puttita Supajirakul	29 March 1996 (aged 20)	-	17
Sapsiree Taerattanachai	18 April 1992 (aged 24)	-	17

==== Indonesia ====
Name	DoB/Age	Singles Rank	Doubles Rank
Anggia Shitta Awanda	22 May 1994 (aged 21)	-	25
Fitriani	27 December 1996 (aged 19)	53	-
Della Destiara Haris	8 December 1992 (aged 23)	-	27
Maria Febe Kusumastuti	30 September 1989 (aged 26)	24	-
Ni Ketut Mahadewi Istirani	12 September 1994 (aged 21)	-	25
Gregoria Mariska Tunjung	11 August 1999 (aged 16)	106	-
Tiara Rosalia Nuraidah	27 June 1993 (aged 22)	-	44
Greysia Polii	1 August 1987 (aged 28)	-	2
Rosyita Eka Putri Sari	6 July 1996 (aged 19)	-	27
Hanna Ramadini	21 February 1995 (aged 21)	63	-

==== Bulgaria ====
Name	DoB/Age	Singles Rank	Doubles Rank
Mariya Mitsova	21 November 1996 (aged 19)	173	370
Petya Nedelcheva	30 July 1983 (aged 32)	70	914
Gabriela Stoeva	15 July 1994 (aged 21)	-	15
Stefani Stoeva	23 September 1995 (aged 20)	336	15
Linda Zechiri	27 July 1987 (aged 28)	40	909

==== Hong Kong ====
Name	DoB/Age	Singles Rank	Doubles Rank
Chau Hoi Wah	5 June 1986 (aged 29)	-	-
Cheung Ngan Yi	27 April 1993 (aged 23)	35	-
Cheung Ying Mei	4 April 1994 (aged 22)	197	163
Ng Tsz Yau	24 April 1998 (aged 18)	-	119
Ng Wing Yung	17 May 1995 (aged 20)	365	207
Poon Lok Yan	22 August 1991 (aged 24)	-	22
Tse Ying Suet	9 November 1991 (aged 24)	-	22
Yeung Nga Ting	13 October 1998 (aged 17)	-	119
Yip Pui Yin	6 August 1987 (aged 28)	30	-
Yuen Sin Ying	13 January 1994 (aged 22)	-	60

=== Group D ===
==== Japan ====
Name	DoB/Age	Singles Rank	Doubles Rank
Naoko Fukuman	3 March 1992 (aged 24)	-	9
Shizuka Matsuo	24 November 1986 (aged 29)	-	10
Misaki Matsutomo	8 February 1992 (aged 24)	-	1
Mami Naito	25 December 1986 (aged 29)	-	10
Aya Ohori	2 October 1996 (aged 19)	43	-
Nozomi Okuhara	13 March 1995 (aged 21)	5	-
Sayaka Sato	29 March 1991 (aged 25)	12	-
Ayaka Takahashi	19 April 1990 (aged 26)	-	1
Akane Yamaguchi	6 June 1997 (aged 18)	11	-
Kurumi Yonao	1 December 1992 (aged 23)	-	9

==== India ====
Name	DoB/Age	Singles Rank	Doubles Rank
Ruthvika Shivani Gadde	26 March 1997 (aged 19)	113	-
Jwala Gutta	7 September 1983 (aged 32)	-	14
Maneesha Kukkapalli	29 April 1995 (aged 21)	-	94
Tanvi Lad	30 January 1993 (aged 23)	91	-
Saina Nehwal	17 March 1990 (aged 26)	8	-
Sikki Reddy Nelakurthi	18 August 1993 (aged 22)	-	57
Ashwini Ponnappa	18 September 1989 (aged 26)	-	14
Puthenpurayil Chandrika Thulasi	31 August 1991 (aged 24)	114	-
Pusarla Venkata Sindhu	5 July 1995 (aged 20)	10	-

==== Australia ====
Name	DoB/Age	Singles Rank	Doubles Rank
Wendy Chen	6 January 1993 (aged 23)	74	134
Leanne Choo	5 June 1991 (aged 24)	1234	115
Tiffany Ho	6 January 1998 (aged 18)	156	235
Joy Lai	18 August 1998 (aged 17)	78	583
Gronya Somerville	10 May 1995 (aged 21)	-	36
Jennifer Tam	27 May 1996 (aged 19)	117	188

==== Germany ====
Name	DoB/Age	Singles Rank	Doubles Rank
Barbara Bellenberg	19 July 1993 (aged 22)	-	92
Fabienne Deprez	8 February 1992 (aged 24)	103	-
Linda Efler	23 January 1995 (aged 21)	-	59
Luise Heim	24 March 1996 (aged 20)	121	245
Isabel Herttrich	17 March 1992 (aged 24)	-	31
Eva Janssens	16 July 1996 (aged 19)	-	92
Lara Kaepplein	25 May 1995 (aged 20)	-	59
Jennifer Karnott	4 March 1995 (aged 21)	-	143
Yvonne Li	30 May 1998 (aged 17)	186	245
Franziska Volkmann	4 April 1994 (aged 22)	-	143
