= 2018 Thomas & Uber Cup squads =

This article lists the confirmed squads lists for badminton's 2018 Thomas & Uber Cup. Rankings stated are based on BWF World Ranking for 3 May 2018.

== Thomas Cup ==
=== Group A ===
==== China ====
Name	DoB/Age	Singles Rank	Doubles Rank
Chen Long	18 January 1989 (aged 29)	4	
Li Junhui	10 May 1995 (aged 23)		4
Lin Dan	14 October 1983 (aged 34)	10	
Liu Cheng	4 January 1992 (aged 26)		3
Liu Yuchen	25 July 1995 (aged 22)		4
Qiao Bin	17 November 1992 (aged 25)	39	
Shi Yuqi	28 February 1996 (aged 22)	5	
Wang Yilü	8 November 1994 (aged 23)		46
Zhang Nan	1 March 1990 (aged 28)		3
Zheng Siwei	26 February 1997 (aged 21)		235

==== India ====
Name	DoB/Age	Singles Rank	Doubles Rank
Manu Attri	31 December 1992 (aged 25)		32
B. Sai Praneeth	10 August 1992 (aged 25)	18	
B. Sumeeth Reddy	26 September 1991 (aged 26)		32
Arun George	8 November 1995 (aged 22)		66
Prannoy Kumar	17 July 1992 (aged 25)	8	
Arjun M.R.	11 May 1997 (aged 21)		43
Ramchandran Shlok	10 May 1995 (aged 23)		43
Lakshya Sen	16 August 2001 (aged 16)	104	
Sanyam Shukla	19 April 1996 (aged 22)		66
Sameer Verma	22 October 1994 (aged 23)	26	

==== France ====
Name	DoB/Age	Singles Rank	Doubles Rank
Jordan Corvée	13 February 1995 (aged 23)		336
Lucas Corvée	9 June 1993 (aged 24)	43	
Thom Gicquel	12 January 1999 (aged 19)		105
Bastian Kersaudy	9 June 1994 (aged 23)		48
Ronan Labar	3 May 1989 (aged 29)		105
Brice Leverdez	9 April 1986 (aged 32)	24	
Julien Maio	6 May 1994 (aged 24)		48
Arnaud Merklé	24 April 2000 (aged 18)	204	
Toma Junior Popov	29 September 1998 (aged 19)	180	1542
Léo Rossi	25 December 1999 (aged 18)	236	447

==== Australia ====
Name	DoB/Age	Singles Rank	Doubles Rank
Matthew Chau	9 November 1994 (aged 23)		59
Ashwant Gobinathan	8 September 1993 (aged 24)	241	
Anthony Joe	2 April 1996 (aged 22)	148	508
Simon Leung	24 November 1996 (aged 21)		102
Jacob Schueler	17 February 1998 (aged 20)	246	214
Sawan Serasinghe	21 February 1994 (aged 24)		59
Raymond Tam	20 October 1986 (aged 31)		153
Teoh Kai Chen	1 November 2000 (aged 17)	359	379
Eric Vuong	21 June 1995 (aged 22)		153
Peter Yan	18 February 2000 (aged 18)	273	

=== Group B ===
==== Indonesia ====
Name	DoB/Age	Singles Rank	Doubles Rank
Mohammad Ahsan	7 September 1987 (aged 30)		52
Fajar Alfian	7 March 1995 (aged 23)		12
Muhammad Rian Ardianto	13 February 1996 (aged 22)		12
Jonatan Christie	15 September 1997 (aged 20)	14	
Marcus Fernaldi Gideon	9 March 1991 (aged 27)		1
Anthony Sinisuka Ginting	20 October 1996 (aged 21)	11	
Firman Abdul Kholik	11 August 1997 (aged 20)	87	
Ihsan Maulana Mustofa	18 November 1995 (aged 22)	50	
Hendra Setiawan	25 August 1984 (aged 33)		52
Kevin Sanjaya Sukamuljo	2 August 1996 (aged 21)		1

==== South Korea ====
Name	DoB/Age	Singles Rank	Doubles Rank
Choi Sol-gyu	5 August 1995 (aged 22)		75
Chung Eui-seok	28 November 1989 (aged 28)		25
Ha Young-woong	17 June 1992 (aged 25)	217	
Heo Kwang-hee	11 August 1995 (aged 22)	127	
Kang Min-hyuk	17 February 1999 (aged 19)		166
Kim Duk-young	12 September 1991 (aged 26)		25
Kim Won-ho	2 June 1999 (aged 18)		20
Lee Dong-keun	20 November 1990 (aged 27)	40	
Seo Seung-jae	4 September 1997 (aged 20)		20
Son Wan-ho	17 May 1988 (aged 30)	2	

==== Canada ====
Name	DoB/Age	Singles Rank	Doubles Rank
Paul-Antoine Dostie-Guindon	8 December 1993 (aged 24)	386	
Jason Ho-shue	29 August 1998 (aged 19)	68	40
Jonathan Lai	16 September 1997 (aged 20)	444	319
Antonio Li	3 January 1997 (aged 21)	334	736
Ty Alexander Lindeman	15 August 1997 (aged 20)	1600	193
Nyl Yakura	14 February 1993 (aged 25)		40
Brian Yang	25 November 2001 (aged 16)	182	553
Duncan Yao	14 September 1995 (aged 22)		1360

==== Thailand ====
Name	DoB/Age	Singles Rank	Doubles Rank
Suppanyu Avihingsanon	24 October 1989 (aged 28)	27	
Tinn Isriyanet	7 July 1993 (aged 24)		24
Kittinupong Kedren	19 July 1996 (aged 21)		33
Kittisak Namdash	4 August 1995 (aged 22)		24
Khosit Phetpradab	9 July 1994 (aged 23)	25	
Nipitphon Phuangphuapet	31 May 1991 (aged 26)		27
Dechapol Puavaranukroh	20 May 1997 (aged 21)		33
Pannawit Thongnuam	24 December 1995 (aged 22)	49	
Tanupat Viriyangkura	10 March 1996 (aged 22)		79
Kantaphon Wangcharoen	18 September 1998 (aged 19)	36	

=== Group C ===
==== Chinese Taipei ====
Name	DoB/Age	Singles Rank	Doubles Rank
Chen Hung-ling	10 February 1986 (aged 32)		8
Chou Tien-chen	8 January 1990 (aged 28)	6	
Hsu Jen-hao	26 October 1991 (aged 26)	31	264
Lee Jhe-huei	20 March 1994 (aged 24)		7
Lee Yang	12 August 1995 (aged 22)		7
Lu Ching-yao	7 June 1993 (aged 24)		13
Wang Chi-lin	18 January 1995 (aged 23)		8
Wang Tzu-wei	27 February 1995 (aged 23)	13	
Yang Chih-chieh	10 December 1991 (aged 26)	298	433
Yang Po-han	13 March 1994 (aged 24)		13

==== Japan ====
Name	DoB/Age	Singles Rank	Doubles Rank
Hiroyuki Endo	16 December 1986 (aged 31)		26
Takuto Inoue	26 February 1995 (aged 23)		9
Takeshi Kamura	14 February 1990 (aged 28)		5
Yuki Kaneko	22 July 1994 (aged 23)		9
Kento Momota	1 September 1994 (aged 23)	12	
Kenta Nishimoto	30 August 1994 (aged 23)	15	
Kazumasa Sakai	13 February 1990 (aged 28)	17	
Keigo Sonoda	20 February 1990 (aged 28)		5
Kanta Tsuneyama	21 June 1996 (aged 21)	32	
Yuta Watanabe	13 June 1997 (aged 20)		26

==== Germany ====
Name	DoB/Age	Singles Rank	Doubles Rank
Jones Ralfy Jansen	28 April 1992 (aged 26)		29
Peter Käsbauer	17 March 1988 (aged 30)		99
Mark Lamsfuß	19 April 1994 (aged 24)		28
Alexander Roovers	17 March 1987 (aged 31)	83	
Fabian Roth	29 November 1995 (aged 22)	165	
Kai Schäfer	13 June 1993 (aged 24)	91	736
Lars Schänzler	24 August 1995 (aged 22)	119	
Marvin Emil Seidel	9 November 1995 (aged 22)		28
Josche Zurwonne	23 March 1989 (aged 29)		29
Marc Zwiebler	13 March 1984 (aged 34)	121	1545

==== Hong Kong ====
Name	DoB/Age	Singles Rank	Doubles Rank
Ho Wai Lun			450
Hu Yun	31 August 1981 (aged 36)	41	
Lee Cheuk Yiu	28 August 1996 (aged 21)	38	
Lee Chun Hei	25 January 1994 (aged 24)		57
Mak Hee Chun	28 August 1990 (aged 27)		200
Ng Ka Long	24 June 1994 (aged 23)	9	
Or Chin Chung	26 October 1994 (aged 23)		38
Tang Chun Man	20 March 1995 (aged 23)		38
Wong Wing Ki	18 March 1990 (aged 28)	20	
Yeung Shing Choi	21 March 1996 (aged 22)		344

=== Group D ===
==== Denmark ====
Name	DoB/Age	Singles Rank	Doubles Rank
Anders Antonsen	27 April 1997 (aged 21)	16	
Kim Astrup	6 March 1992 (aged 26)		10
Viktor Axelsen	4 January 1994 (aged 24)	1	
Mathias Boe	11 July 1980 (aged 37)		2
Mathias Christiansen	20 February 1994 (aged 24)		22
Mads Conrad-Petersen	12 January 1988 (aged 30)		6
Jan Ø. Jørgensen	31 December 1987 (aged 30)	52	
Mads Pieler Kolding	27 January 1988 (aged 30)		6
Anders Skaarup Rasmussen	15 February 1989 (aged 29)		10
Hans-Kristian Vittinghus	16 January 1986 (aged 32)	23	

==== Malaysia ====
Name	DoB/Age	Singles Rank	Doubles Rank
Mohamad Arif Abdul Latif	22 August 1989 (aged 28)		191
Aaron Chia	24 February 1997 (aged 21)		68
Goh V Shem	20 May 1989 (aged 29)		15
Lee Chong Wei	21 October 1982 (aged 35)	7	
Lee Zii Jia	29 March 1998 (aged 20)	45	
Leong Jun Hao	13 July 1999 (aged 18)	80	
Soh Wooi Yik	17 February 1998 (aged 20)		68
Tan Wee Kiong	21 May 1989 (aged 28)		15
Teo Ee Yi	4 April 1993 (aged 25)		17
Iskandar Zulkarnain Zainuddin	24 May 1991 (aged 26)	51	

==== Russia ====
Name	DoB/Age	Singles Rank	Doubles Rank
Rodion Alimov	21 April 1998 (aged 20)		148
Evgenij Dremin	24 February 1981 (aged 37)		63
Denis Grachev	18 January 1992 (aged 26)	393	63
Shokhzod Gulomzoda	28 February 1994 (aged 24)	699	
Vladimir Ivanov	3 July 1987 (aged 30)		11
Georgii Karpov	17 July 2001 (aged 16)	438	337
Nikita Lemeshko	19 April 1999 (aged 19)	747	
Vladimir Malkov	9 April 1986 (aged 32)	53	234
Sergey Sirant	12 April 1994 (aged 24)	73	
Ivan Sozonov	6 July 1989 (aged 28)		11

==== Algeria ====
Name	DoB/Age	Singles Rank	Doubles Rank
Bouksani Abderrahim	21 March 2002 (aged 16)	1209	736
Majed Yacine Balahoune	21 October 1999 (aged 18)	491	295
Mohamed Abderrahime Belarbi	8 August 1992 (aged 25)	352	113
Adel Hamek	25 October 1992 (aged 25)	400	113
Samy Khaldi	15 July 1999 (aged 18)	543	1541
Sifeddine Larbaoui	30 June 2002 (aged 15)	315	253
Koceila Mammeri	23 February 1999 (aged 19)	649	176
Adel Meddah	14 August 1997 (aged 20)		
Youcef Sabri Medel	5 July 1996 (aged 21)	347	176
Mohamed Abdelaziz Ouchefoun	9 September 2001 (aged 16)	608	253

== Uber Cup ==
=== Group A ===
==== Japan ====
Name	DoB/Age	Singles Rank	Doubles Rank
Yuki Fukushima	6 May 1993 (aged 25)		3
Sayaka Hirota	1 August 1994 (aged 23)		3
Misaki Matsutomo	8 February 1992 (aged 26)		4
Nozomi Okuhara	13 March 1995 (aged 23)	6	
Sayaka Sato	29 March 1991 (aged 27)	13	
Ayaka Takahashi	19 April 1990 (aged 28)		4
Sayaka Takahashi	29 July 1992 (aged 25)	19	
Shiho Tanaka	5 September 1992 (aged 25)		5
Akane Yamaguchi	6 June 1997 (aged 20)	2	
Koharu Yonemoto	7 December 1990 (aged 27)		5

==== India ====
Name	DoB/Age	Singles Rank	Doubles Rank
Vaishnavi Bhale	30 July 1996 (aged 21)		
Sanyogita Ghorpade	5 November 1992 (aged 25)		76
Vaishnavi Reddy Jakka	1 May 2002 (aged 16)	64	236
Meghana Jakkampudi	28 December 1995 (aged 22)		49
Sri Krishna Priya Kudaravalli	28 October 1997 (aged 20)	66	
Saina Nehwal	17 March 1990 (aged 28)	10	
Anura Prabhudesai	17 September 1998 (aged 19)	110	390
Poorvisha S. Ram	24 January 1995 (aged 23)		49
Prajakta Sawant	28 October 1992 (aged 25)		76

==== Canada ====
Name	DoB/Age	Singles Rank	Doubles Rank
Anne-Julie Beaulieu	26 September 1994 (aged 23)		284
Catherine Choi	1 May 2001 (aged 17)	747	390
Rachel Honderich	21 April 1996 (aged 22)	46	114
Michelle Li	3 November 1991 (aged 26)	14	224
Stephanie Pakenham	29 November 1990 (aged 27)		284
Brittney Tam	23 August 1997 (aged 20)	49	593
Michelle Tong	25 January 1997 (aged 21)		99
Kristen Tsai	11 July 1995 (aged 22)		114
Josephine Wu	20 January 1995 (aged 23)		99

==== Australia ====
Name	DoB/Age	Singles Rank	Doubles Rank
Chen Hsuan-yu	1 June 1993 (aged 24)	81	240
Zecily Fung	1 October 2001 (aged 16)	236	300
Khoo Lee Yen	25 May 1998 (aged 19)		665
Lauren Lim	19 May 1999 (aged 19)	271	665
Louisa Ma	26 November 1994 (aged 23)	145	368
Setyana Mapasa	15 August 1995 (aged 22)		19
Ann-Louise Slee	1 January 1990 (aged 28)	1251	500
Gronya Somerville	10 May 1995 (aged 23)		19
Jennifer Tam	27 May 1996 (aged 21)	126	240
Renuga Veeran	20 June 1986 (aged 31)		110

=== Group B ===
==== Thailand ====
Name	DoB/Age	Singles Rank	Doubles Rank
Chayanit Chaladchalam	8 March 1991 (aged 27)		15
Pornpawee Chochuwong	22 January 1998 (aged 20)	25	
Ratchanok Intanon	5 February 1995 (aged 23)	4	
Nitchaon Jindapol	31 March 1991 (aged 27)	11	
Jongkolphan Kititharakul	1 March 1993 (aged 25)		8
Phataimas Muenwong	5 July 1995 (aged 22)		15
Busanan Ongbamrungphan	22 March 1996 (aged 22)	24	
Rawinda Prajongjai	29 June 1993 (aged 24)		8
Puttita Supajirakul	29 March 1996 (aged 22)		98
Sapsiree Taerattanachai	18 April 1992 (aged 26)		98

==== Chinese Taipei ====
Name	DoB/Age	Singles Rank	Doubles Rank
Chen Hsiao-huan	12 March 1987 (aged 31)	146	159
Chiang Mei-hui	8 October 1992 (aged 25)	48	
Hsu Ya-ching	30 July 1991 (aged 26)	249	27
Hu Ling-fang	4 June 1998 (aged 19)	186	51
Kuo Yu-wen	5 November 1991 (aged 26)		220
Lin Wan-ching	1 November 1995 (aged 22)		220
Lin Ying-chun	5 March 1994 (aged 24)	264	186
Pai Yu-po	18 April 1991 (aged 27)	23	186
Tai Tzu-ying	20 June 1994 (aged 23)	1	
Wu Ti-jung	23 February 1993 (aged 25)		27

==== Germany ====
Name	DoB/Age	Singles Rank	Doubles Rank
Fabienne Deprez	8 February 1992 (aged 26)	76	
Linda Efler	23 January 1995 (aged 23)		97
Johanna Goliszewski	5 September 1986 (aged 31)		42
Luise Heim	24 March 1996 (aged 22)	56	
Isabel Herttrich	17 March 1992 (aged 26)		38
Lara Käpplein	25 May 1995 (aged 22)		42
Olga Konon	11 November 1989 (aged 28)		97
Yvonne Li	30 May 1998 (aged 19)	70	
Carla Nelte	21 September 1990 (aged 27)		38
Miranda Wilson	6 April 2000 (aged 18)	1269	642

==== Hong Kong ====
Name	DoB/Age	Singles Rank	Doubles Rank
Cheung Ngan Yi	27 April 1993 (aged 25)	26	
Cheung Ying Mei	4 April 1994 (aged 24)	261	591
Ng Tsz Yau	24 April 1998 (aged 20)		82
Ng Wing Yung	17 May 1995 (aged 23)		88
Poon Lok Yan	22 August 1991 (aged 26)		33
Wu Yi Ting	28 April 1996 (aged 22)		253
Yeung Nga Ting	13 October 1998 (aged 19)		82
Yeung Sum Yee	18 August 1999 (aged 18)	743	
Yip Pui Yin	6 August 1987 (aged 30)	35	
Yuen Sin Ying	13 January 1994 (aged 24)		112

=== Group C ===
==== South Korea ====
Name	DoB/Age	Singles Rank	Doubles Rank
An Se-young	5 February 2002 (aged 16)	501	
Baek Ha-na	22 September 2000 (aged 17)		39
Kim Hye-rin	19 May 1995 (aged 23)		29
Kim So-yeong	9 July 1992 (aged 25)		21
Kong Hee-yong	11 December 1996 (aged 21)		32
Lee Jang-mi	25 August 1994 (aged 23)	16	
Lee Se-yeon	14 April 1995 (aged 23)	116	
Lee Yu-rim	27 January 2000 (aged 18)		39
Shin Seung-chan	6 December 1994 (aged 23)		7
Sung Ji-hyun	29 July 1991 (aged 26)	8	

==== Denmark ====
Name	DoB/Age	Singles Rank	Doubles Rank
Mia Blichfeldt	19 August 1997 (aged 20)	17	1106
Alexandra Bøje	6 December 1999 (aged 18)		65
Line Christophersen	14 January 2000 (aged 18)	196	
Julie Finne-Ipsen	22 January 1995 (aged 23)	645	50
Maiken Fruergaard	11 May 1995 (aged 23)		20
Line Kjærsfeldt	20 April 1994 (aged 24)	29	
Natalia Koch Rohde	1 August 1995 (aged 22)	36	1100
Rikke Søby Hansen	1 February 1995 (aged 23)		50
Sara Thygesen	20 January 1991 (aged 27)		20

==== Russia ====
Name	DoB/Age	Singles Rank	Doubles Rank
Ekaterina Bolotova	12 December 1992 (aged 25)		34
Anastasia Chervyakova	14 June 1992 (aged 25)		23
Alina Davletova	18 July 1998 (aged 19)		34
Ksenia Evgenova	19 April 1996 (aged 22)	133	185
Elena Komendrovskaja	19 May 1991 (aged 27)	243	273
Evgeniya Kosetskaya	16 November 1994 (aged 23)	22	
Olga Morozova	10 March 1995 (aged 23)		23
Natalia Perminova	14 November 1991 (aged 26)	57	308
Anastasiia Pustinskaia	10 April 2001 (aged 17)		23
Nina Vislova	4 October 1986 (aged 31)		308

==== Mauritius ====
Name	DoB/Age	Singles Rank	Doubles Rank
Aurelie Allet	1 July 1997 (aged 20)	219	125
Kobita Dookhee	13 August 1998 (aged 19)	242	125
Kate Foo Kune	29 March 1993 (aged 25)	65	665
Jemimah Leung For Sang	26 March 2002 (aged 16)	819	665
Ganesha Mungrah	12 June 2001 (aged 16)	351	434

=== Group D ===
==== China ====
Name	DoB/Age	Singles Rank	Doubles Rank
Chen Qingchen	23 June 1997 (aged 20)		1
Chen Yufei	1 March 1998 (aged 20)	5	
Gao Fangjie	29 September 1998 (aged 19)	32	
He Bingjiao	21 March 1997 (aged 21)	9	
Huang Dongping	20 January 1995 (aged 23)		52
Huang Yaqiong	28 February 1994 (aged 24)		9
Jia Yifan	29 June 1997 (aged 20)		1
Li Xuerui	24 January 1991 (aged 27)	234	
Tang Jinhua	8 January 1992 (aged 26)		77
Zheng Yu	7 February 1996 (aged 22)		165

==== Indonesia ====
Name	DoB/Age	Singles Rank	Doubles Rank
Dinar Dyah Ayustine	18 October 1993 (aged 24)	43	
Fitriani	27 December 1996 (aged 21)	34	
Della Destiara Haris	8 December 1992 (aged 25)		12
Ruselli Hartawan	27 December 1997 (aged 20)	80	
Ni Ketut Mahadewi Istarani	12 September 1994 (aged 23)		14
Nitya Krishinda Maheswari	16 December 1988 (aged 29)		72
Greysia Polii	11 August 1987 (aged 30)		6
Rizki Amelia Pradipta	1 September 1990 (aged 27)		12
Apriyani Rahayu	29 April 1998 (aged 20)		6
Gregoria Mariska Tunjung	11 August 1999 (aged 18)	38	

==== France ====
Name	DoB/Age	Singles Rank	Doubles Rank
Marie Batomene	10 March 1995 (aged 23)	167	
Delphine Delrue	6 November 1998 (aged 19)		41
Ainoa Desmons	18 February 2001 (aged 17)	748	329
Vimala Hériau	10 February 1999 (aged 19)		434
Yaëlle Hoyaux	1 February 1998 (aged 20)	155	
Margot Lambert	15 March 1999 (aged 19)	990	141
Émilie Lefel	25 August 1988 (aged 29)		24
Katia Normand	12 July 1997 (aged 20)	185	
Léa Palermo	7 July 1994 (aged 23)		41
Anne Tran	27 April 1996 (aged 22)		24

==== Malaysia ====
Name	DoB/Age	Singles Rank	Doubles Rank
Soniia Cheah	19 June 1993 (aged 24)	30	
Chow Mei Kuan	23 December 1994 (aged 23)		18
Goh Jin Wei	30 January 2000 (aged 18)	31	
Goh Yea Ching	19 June 1996 (aged 21)		105
Vivian Hoo	19 March 1990 (aged 28)		25
Lee Meng Yean	30 March 1994 (aged 24)		18
Lee Ying Ying	25 October 1997 (aged 20)	42	
Kisona Selvaduray	1 October 1998 (aged 19)	60	
Soong Fie Cho	5 January 1989 (aged 29)		35
Tee Jing Yi	8 February 1991 (aged 27)		35
