= 2008 Thomas Cup qualification =

Tournament details
- Dates: February 8, 2008 – February 24, 2008
- Venue: BA: Military Zone 7 Gymnasium; BCA: National Badminton Centre; BE: Topsportcentrum Almere; BO: Salle Veyret; BPA: Sociedade Hípica de Campinas
- Location: BA: Ho Chi Minh City, Vietnam; BCA: Rose Hill, Mauritius; BE: Almere, Netherlands; BO: Nouméa, New Caledonia; BPA: Campinas, Brazil

The 2008 Thomas Cup qualification process is a series of tournaments organised by the five BWF confederations to decide 10 of the 12 teams which will play in the 2008 Thomas Cup, with Indonesia qualifying automatically as hosts and China trophy holders.

== Qualified teams ==
Country	Confederation	Qualified as	Qualified on	Final appearance
Indonesia	Badminton Asia	2008 Thomas Cup hosts	December 2005	22nd
China	Badminton Asia	2008 Thomas Cup winners	7 May 2006	14th
Nigeria	Badminton Africa	2008 Thomas Cup Preliminaries for Africa winners	21 February 2008	Debut
Malaysia	Badminton Asia	2008 Badminton Asia Thomas Cup Preliminaries winners	23 February 2008	22nd
South Korea	Badminton Asia	2008 Badminton Asia Thomas Cup Preliminaries runners-up	23 February 2008	13th
Japan	Badminton Asia	2008 Badminton Asia Thomas Cup Preliminaries semifinalists	23 February 2008	9th
Thailand	Badminton Asia	2008 Badminton Asia Thomas Cup Preliminaries gamess	23 February 2008	10th
Denmark	Badminton Europe	2008 European Team Championships winners	17 February 2008	25th
England	Badminton Europe	2008 European Team Championships runners-up	17 February 2008	11th
Germany	Badminton Europe	2008 European Team Championships third place	17 February 2008	4th
Australia	Badminton Oceania	2008 Thomas Cup Preliminaries for Oceania winners	8 February 2008	2nd
Canada	Badminton Pan Am	2008 Pan American Thomas Cup Preliminaries winners	21 February 2008	5th

== Qualification process ==
The number of teams participating in the final tournament is 12. The allocation of slots for each confederation is the same allocation from 2004 tournament; 4 from Asia, 3 from Europe, and 1 from each Africa, Oceania and Pan Am. Two automatic qualifiers are the host and defending champion.

== Confederation qualification ==
=== Badminton Confederation of Africa ===
The qualification for the African teams was held from 17 to 21 February 2008, at the National Badminton Centre in Rose Hill, Mauritius. The winners of the African qualification will qualify for the Thomas Cup.

==== Teams in contention ====
Teams qualified for the Group stage

- Egypt
- Kenya
- Mauritius
- Nigeria
- South Africa
- Uganda
- Zambia

==== First round (group stage) ====
Advance to Knockout stage

Group A

Pos	Team	Pld	Pts
1	South Africa	3	3
2	Egypt	3	2
3	Uganda	3	1
4	Kenya	3	0

Source: africa-badminton.com

Group B

Pos	Team	Pld	Pts
1	Nigeria	2	2
2	Mauritius (H)	2	1
3	Zambia	2	0

Source: africa-badminton.com
(H) Host

==== Second round (knockout stage) ====
Semi-finals
20 February
South Africa	3
Mauritius	0
20 February
Egypt	1
Nigeria	3

Final
21 February
South Africa	0
Nigeria	3

=== Badminton Asia ===
The qualification for the Asian teams was held from 19 to 24 February 2008, at the Military Zone 7 Gymnasium in Ho Chi Minh City, Vietnam. The semi-finalists of the Asian qualification will qualify for the Thomas Cup.

==== Teams in contention ====
Teams qualified for the Group stage

- Cambodia
- Chinese Taipei
- Hong Kong
- India
- Indonesia
- Japan
- Macau
- Pakistan
- Philippines
- Singapore
- South Korea
- Sri Lanka
- Thailand
- Vietnam

==== First round (group stage) ====
Advance to Knockout stage

Group A
Group B

Pos	Team	Pld	Pts
1	Malaysia	3	3
2	Chinese Taipei	3	2
3	Philippines	3	1
4	Cambodia	3	0

Source: TS

Pos	Team	Pld	Pts
1	South Korea	2	2
2	Singapore	2	1
3	Vietnam (H)	2	0

Source: TS
(H) Host
Group C
Group D

Pos	Team	Pld	Pts
1	Japan	2	2
2	India	2	1
3	Pakistan	2	0

Source: TS

Pos	Team	Pld	Pts
1	Thailand	3	3
2	Hong Kong	3	2
3	Sri Lanka	3	1
4	Macau	3	0

Source: TS

==== Second round (knockout stage) ====
Quarter-finals
A1	Malaysia	3
C2	India	0
D1	Thailand	3
B1	Singapore	0
A2	Chinese Taipei	2
C1	Japan	3
D2	Hong Kong	0
B1	South Korea	3

Semi-finals
A1	Malaysia	3
D1	Thailand	0
C1	Japan	0
B1	South Korea	3

Final
A1	Malaysia	3
B1	South Korea	2
Third place
D1	Thailand	1
C1	Japan	3

=== Badminton Europe ===
The qualification for the European teams was held from 12 to 17 February 2008, at the Topsportcentrum in Almere, Netherlands. The semi-finalists of the European qualification will qualify for the Thomas Cup.

==== Teams in contention ====
Teams qualified for the Group stage

- Austria
- Belgium
- Bulgaria
- Czech Republic
- Denmark
- England
- Estonia
- Finland
- France
- Germany
- Greece
- Hungary
- Iceland
- Ireland
- Israel
- Italy
- Lithuania
- Netherlands
- Norway
- Poland
- Portugal
- Russia
- Scotland
- Slovakia
- Spain
- Sweden
- Switzerland
- Turkey
- Ukraine
- Wales

==== First round (group stage) ====
Advance to Knockout stage

Group A
Group B
Group C

Pos	Team	Pld	Pts
1	Denmark	2	2
2	Scotland	2	1
3	Israel	2	0

Source: BWF

Pos	Team	Pld	Pts
1	England	2	2
2	Finland	2	1
3	Lithuania	2	0

Source: BWF

Pos	Team	Pld	Pts
1	Germany	3	3
2	Estonia	3	2
3	Hungary	3	1
4	Norway	3	0

Source: BWF
Group D
Group E
Group F

Pos	Team	Pld	Pts
1	Poland	3	3
2	Portugal	3	1
3	Bulgaria	3	1
4	Belgium	3	1

Source: BWF

Pos	Team	Pld	Pts
1	Sweden	3	3
2	France	3	2
3	Italy	3	1
4	Greece	3	0

Source: BWF

Pos	Team	Pld	Pts
1	Netherlands (H)	3	3
2	Ukraine	3	2
3	Ireland	3	1
4	Slovakia	3	0

Source: BWF
(H) Host
Group G
Group H

Pos	Team	Pld	Pts
1	Russia	3	3
2	Spain	3	2
3	Iceland	3	1
4	Turkey	3	0

Source: BWF

Pos	Team	Pld	Pts
1	Wales	3	3
2	Czech Republic	3	2
3	Austria	3	1
4	Switzerland	3	0

Source: BWF

==== Second round (knockout stage) ====
Quarter-finals
15 February 2008
Denmark	3
Sweden	0
Germany	3
Wales	0
Netherlands	2
Poland	3
Russia	0
England	3

Semi-finals
16 February 2008
Denmark	3
Germany	1
Poland	0
England	3

Final
17 February 2008
Denmark	3
England	0
Third place
17 February 2008
Germany	3
Poland	1

=== Badminton Oceania ===
The qualification for the Oceanian teams was held on 8 February 2008, at Salle Veyret in Nouméa, New Caledonia. The winner of the Oceania qualification will qualify for the Thomas Cup.

==== Teams in contention ====
- Australia
- New Zealand

==== Play-off ====
Team 1	Score	Team 2
New Zealand	3–2	Australia

=== Badminton Pan Am ===
The qualification for the Pan Am teams was held from 16 to 18 February 2008, at Sociedade Hípica de Campinas in Campinas, Brazil. The winner of the Pan Am qualification will qualify for the Thomas Cup.

==== Teams in contention ====
Teams qualified for the Group stage

- Brazil
- Canada
- Peru
- United States

==== First round (group stage) ====
Advance to play-off

Round-robin

Pos	Team	Pld	Pts
1	Canada	3	3
2	United States	3	2
3	Brazil (H)	3	1
4	Peru	3	0

Source: BWF
(H) Host

==== Play-off ====
Team 1	Score	Team 2
Canada	3–0	United States
