= 2008 Uber Cup qualification =

Tournament details
- Dates: February 8, 2008 – February 24, 2008
- Venue: BA: Military Zone 7 Gymnasium; BCA: National Badminton Centre; BE: Topsportcentrum Almere; BO: Salle Veyret; BPA: Sociedade Hípica de Campinas
- Location: BA: Ho Chi Minh City, Vietnam; BCA: Rose Hill, Mauritius; BE: Almere, Netherlands; BO: Nouméa, New Caledonia; BPA: Campinas, Brazil

The 2008 Uber Cup qualification process is a series of tournaments organised by the five BWF confederations to decide 10 of the 12 teams which will play in the 2008 Uber Cup, with Indonesia qualifying automatically as hosts and China trophy holders.

== Qualified teams ==
Country	Confederation	Qualified as	Qualified on	Final appearance
Indonesia	Badminton Asia	2008 Uber Cup hosts	December 2005	19th
China	Badminton Asia	2008 Uber Cup winners	7 May 2006	13th
South Africa	Badminton Africa	2008 Uber Cup Preliminaries for Africa winners	21 February 2008	3rd
South Korea	Badminton Asia	2008 Badminton Asia Uber Cup Preliminaries winners	23 February 2008	13rd
Japan	Badminton Asia	2008 Badminton Asia Uber Cup Preliminaries runners-up	23 February 2008	19th
Malaysia	Badminton Asia	2008 Badminton Asia Uber Cup Preliminaries semifinalists	23 February 2008	12th
Hong Kong	Badminton Asia	2008 Badminton Asia Uber Cup Preliminaries semifinalists	23 February 2008	5th
Denmark	Badminton Europe	2008 European Team Championships winners	17 February 2008	15th
Netherlands	Badminton Europe	2008 European Team Championships runners-up	17 February 2008	9th
Germany	Badminton Europe	2008 European Team Championships third place	17 February 2008	4th
New Zealand	Badminton Oceania	2008 Uber Cup Preliminaries for Oceania winners	8 February 2008	6th
Canada	Badminton Pan Am	2008 Pan American Uber Cup Preliminaries winners	21 February 2008	8th

== Qualification process ==
The number of teams participating in the final tournament is 12. The allocation of slots for each confederation is the same allocation from 2004 tournament; 4 from Asia, 3 from Europe, and 1 from each Africa, Oceania and Pan Am. Two automatic qualifiers are the host and defending champion.

== Confederation qualification ==
=== Badminton Confederation of Africa ===
The qualification for the African teams was held from 17 to 21 February 2008, at the National Badminton Centre in Rose Hill, Mauritius. The winners of the African qualification will qualify for the Uber Cup.

==== Teams in contention ====
Teams qualified for the Group stage

- Egypt
- Mauritius
- Nigeria
- South Africa

==== First round (group stage) ====
Advance to Knockout stage

Round-robin

Pos	Team	Pld	Pts
1	Nigeria	3	3
2	South Africa	3	2
3	Mauritius (H)	3	1
4	Egypt	3	0

Source: africa-badminton.com
(H) Host

==== Second round (knockout stage) ====
Semi-finals
20 February
South Africa	3
Mauritius	1
20 February
Egypt	0
Nigeria	3

Final
21 February
South Africa	3
Nigeria	2

=== Badminton Asia ===
The qualification for the Asian teams was held from 19 to 24 February 2008, at the Military Zone 7 Gymnasium in Ho Chi Minh City, Vietnam. The semi-finalists of the Asian qualification will qualify for the Uber Cup.

==== Teams in contention ====
Teams qualified for the Group stage

- Cambodia
- Chinese Taipei
- Hong Kong
- India
- Indonesia
- Japan
- Singapore
- South Korea
- Sri Lanka
- Thailand
- Vietnam

==== First round (group stage) ====
Advance to Knockout stage

Group W
Group X

Pos	Team	Pld	Pts
1	Japan	2	2
2	Thailand	2	1
3	Sri Lanka	2	0

Source: TS

Pos	Team	Pld	Pts
1	South Korea	2	2
2	Singapore	2	1
3	Cambodia	2	0

Source: TS
Group Y
Group Z

Pos	Team	Pld	Pts
1	Hong Kong	2	2
2	Chinese Taipei	2	1
3	Vietnam (H)	2	0

Source: TS
(H) Host

Pos	Team	Pld	Pts
1	Malaysia	1	1
2	India	1	0

Source: TS

==== Second round (knockout stage) ====
Quarter-finals
W1	Japan	3
Y2	Chinese Taipei	1
Z1	Malaysia	3
X2	Singapore	1
W2	Thailand	0
Y1	Hong Kong	3
Z2	India	1
X1	South Korea	3

Semi-finals
W1	Japan	3
Z1	Malaysia	2
Y1	Hong Kong	1
X1	South Korea	3

Final
W1	Japan	1
X1	South Korea	3
Third place
Z1	Malaysia	3
Y1	Hong Kong	0

=== Badminton Europe ===
The qualification for the European teams was held from 12 to 17 February 2008, at the Topsportcentrum in Almere, Netherlands. The semi-finalists of the European qualification will qualify for the Uber Cup.

==== Teams in contention ====
Teams qualified for the Group stage

- Austria
- Belarus
- Belgium
- Bulgaria
- Czech Republic
- Denmark
- England
- Estonia
- Finland
- France
- Germany
- Iceland
- Ireland
- Italy
- Lithuania
- Netherlands
- Poland
- Portugal
- Russia
- Scotland
- Slovakia
- Spain
- Sweden
- Switzerland
- Turkey
- Ukraine
- Wales

==== First round (group stage) ====
Advance to Knockout stage

Group A
Group B
Group C

Pos	Team	Pld	Pts
1	Germany	3	3
2	Iceland	3	2
3	Italy	3	1
4	Wales	3	0

Source: BWF

Pos	Team	Pld	Pts
1	England	2	2
2	Sweden	2	1
3	Spain	2	0

Source: BWF

Pos	Team	Pld	Pts
1	France	3	2
2	Ukraine	3	2
3	Switzerland	3	2
4	Austria	3	0

Source: BWF
Group D
Group E
Group F

Pos	Team	Pld	Pts
1	Russia	3	3
2	Finland	3	2
3	Belgium	3	1
4	Ireland	3	0

Source: BWF

Pos	Team	Pld	Pts
1	Denmark	3	3
2	Belarus	3	2
3	Czech Republic	3	1
4	Estonia	3	0

Source: BWF

Pos	Team	Pld	Pts
1	Netherlands (H)	3	3
2	Poland	3	2
3	Portugal	3	1
4	Turkey	3	0

Source: BWF
(H) Host
Group G

Pos	Team	Pld	Pts
1	Scotland	3	3
2	Bulgaria	3	2
3	Slovakia	3	1
4	Lithuania	3	0

Source: BWF

==== Second round (knockout stage) ====
Quarter-finals
15 February 2008
Germany
BYE
Russia	0
Denmark	3
Scotland	3
France	2
England	1
Netherlands	3

Semi-finals
16 February 2008
Germany	1
Denmark	3
Scotland	0
Netherlands	3

Final
17 February 2008
Denmark	3
Netherlands	0
Third place
17 February 2008
Germany	3
Scotland	1

=== Badminton Oceania ===
The qualification for the Oceanian teams was held on 8 February 2008, at Salle Veyret in Nouméa, New Caledonia. The winner of the Oceania qualification will qualify for the Uber Cup.

==== Teams in contention ====
- Australia
- New Zealand

==== Play-off ====
Team 1	Score	Team 2
New Zealand	3–0	Australia

=== Badminton Pan Am ===
The qualification for the Pan Am teams was held from 16 to 18 February 2008, at Sociedade Hípica de Campinas in Campinas, Brazil. The winner of the Pan Am qualification will qualify for the Uber Cup.

==== Teams in contention ====
Teams qualified for the Group stage

- Brazil
- Canada
- Peru
- United States

==== First round (group stage) ====
Advance to play-off

Round-robin

Pos	Team	Pld	Pts
1	Canada	3	3
2	United States	3	2
3	Peru	3	1
4	Brazil (H)	3	0

Source: BWF
(H) Host

==== Play-off ====
Team 1	Score	Team 2
Canada	1–3	United States
