= Badminton at the 2004 Commonwealth Youth Games =

Badminton championships

2004 Commonwealth Youth Games
Tournament details
- Dates: 29 November – 4 December
- Edition: 1st
- Venue: Bendigo Badminton & Tennis Stadium
- Location: Victoria Street, Eaglehawk, Bendigo, Australia

Badminton at the 2004 Commonwealth Youth Games was held in Bendigo in the Australian state of Victoria in the months of November and December. This was the first time badminton was introduced in the games, in which only the mixed team event was held. Mixed team event was played with the format of Boys' singles, Girls' singles, Boys' doubles, Girls' doubles and Mixed doubles. Malaysia emerged as the champion, while India and England settled with silver and bronze medals respectively.

== Medalists ==
Discipline	Gold	Silver	Bronze
Mixed team	Malaysia Azrihanif Azahar; Lyddia Cheah; Tan Boon Heong; Hoon Thien How; Ng Hui Lin; Woon Khe Wei	India Anand Pawar; Saina Nehwal; Sagar Chopda; Jishnu Sanyal; Aparna Balan	England Rajiv Ouseph; Helen Ward; Andrew Ellis; Dean George; Heather Olver; Jenny Wallwork

== Participant countries and squads ==
England, India, Malaysia, Australia, Scotland, South Africa, New Zealand and Singapore participated in this edition.

=== Pool A ===
Pool A consisted of top seed Malaysia, Scotland, fourth seed Singapore and Australia.

==== Malaysia ====
- Azrihanif Azahar
- Hoon Thien How
- Lyddia Cheah
- Ng Hui Lin
- Tan Boon Heong
- Woon Khe Wei

==== Scotland ====
- Imogen Bankier
- Julie Boyd
- Watson Briggs
- Stuart Gilliland
- Emma Mason
- Calum Menzies

==== Singapore ====
- Chew Swee Hau
- Colleen Goh
- Koh Yan Sen
- Vanessa Neo
- Aaron Tan
- Karen Yuen

==== Australia ====
- Erin Carroll
- Tiger Chen
- Sue Li Hong
- Erica Pong
- Raymond Tam
- Jeff Tho

=== Pool B ===
Pool B consisted of second seed England, New Zealand, third seeded India and South Africa.

==== England ====
- Andrew Ellis
- Dean George
- Heather Olver
- Rajiv Ouseph
- Jenny Wallwork
- Helen Ward

==== New Zealand ====
- Michelle Chan
- Garbo Choi
- Belinda Hill
- Chan Yun Lung
- Henry Tam
- Joe Wu

==== India ====
- Aparna Balan
- Sagar Chopda
- Saina Nehwal
- Anand Pawar
- Jishnu Sanyal

==== South Africa ====
- Richard Anderton
- Rowen Brown
- Stacey Doubell
- Annari Viljoen

== Group matches ==
=== Pool A ===
Malaysia V/s Scotland

Malaysia
4

1 December 2004

Scotland
1

			1	2	3
1	(Malaysia) (Scotland)	Azrihanif Azahar; Calum Menzies	15; 5	15; 4
2	(Malaysia) (Scotland)	Lyddia Cheah; Julie Boyd	11; 8	11; 7
3	(Malaysia) (Scotland)	Hoon Thien How / Tan Boon Heong; Stuart Gilliland / Calum Menzies	15; 6	15; 7
4	(Malaysia) (Scotland)	Ng Hui Lin / Woon Khe Wei; Imogen Bankier / Emma Mason	15; 2	2; 15	15; 13
5	(Malaysia) (Scotland)	Hoon Thien How / Ng Hui Lin; Watson Briggs / Imogen Bankier	15; 12	11; 15	12; 15

Singapore V/s Australia

Singapore
5

1 December 2004

Australia
0

			1	2	3
1	(Singapore) (Australia)	Chew Swee Hau; Tiger Chen	15; 9	15; 6
2	(Singapore) (Australia)	Karen Yuen; Erin Carroll	11; 6	11; 6
3	(Singapore) (Australia)	Koh Yan Sen / Aaron Tan; Jeff Tho / Raymond Tam	12; 15	15; 10	15; 8
4	(Singapore) (Australia)	Colleen Goh / Vanessa Neo; Erin Carroll / Erica Pong	15; 11	15; 8
5	(Singapore) (Australia)	Koh Yan Sen / Vanessa Neo; Tiger Chen / Sue Li Yong	15; 8	15; 11

Malaysia V/s Australia

Malaysia
4

1 December 2004

Australia
1

			1	2	3
1	(Malaysia) (Australia)	Azrihanif Azahar; Jeff Tho	15; 6	15; 12
2	(Malaysia) (Australia)	Lyddia Cheah; Erica Pong	11; 4	11; 2
3	(Malaysia) (Australia)	Hoon Thien How / Tan Boon Heong; Jeff Tho / Raymond Tam	15; 5	15; 2
4	(Malaysia) (Australia)	Ng Hui Lin / Woon Khe Wei; Erin Carroll / Erica Pong	15; 2	15; 5
5	(Malaysia) (Australia)	Tan Boon Heong / Woon Khe Wei; Tiger Chen / Sue Li Yong	7; 15	15; 12	9; 15

Singapore V/s Scotland

Singapore
3

1 December 2004

Scotland
2

			1	2	3
1	(Singapore) (Scotland)	Chew Swee Hau; Calum Mazies	15; 5	15; 9
2	(Singapore) (Scotland)	Colleen Goh; Julie Boyd	6; 11	8; 11
3	(Singapore) (Scotland)	Koh Yan Sen / Aaron Tan; Stuart Gilliland / Calum Menzies	15; 7	15; 5
4	(Singapore) (Scotland)	Colleen Goh / Vanessa Neo; Imogen Bankier / Emma Mason	4; 15	3; 15
5	(Singapore) (Scotland)	Koh Yan Sen / Vanessa Neo; Watson Briggs / Imogen Bankier	15; 11	11; 15	15; 6

Malaysia V/s Singapore

Malaysia
4

2 December 2004

Singapore
1

			1	2	3
1	(Malaysia) (Singapore)	Azrihanif Azahar; Chew Swee Hau	15; 8	15; 14
2	(Malaysia) (Singapore)	Lyddia Cheah; Colleen Goh	11; 2	11; 2
3	(Malaysia) (Singapore)	Hoon Thien How / Tan Boon Heong; Koh Yan Sen / Aaron Tan	15; 3	15; 7
4	(Malaysia) (Singapore)	Ng Hui Lin / Woon Khe Wei; Vanessa Neo / Karen Yuen	6; 15	3; 15
5	(Malaysia) (Singapore)	Hoon Thien How / Ng Hui Lin; Koh Yan Sen / Vanessa Neo	15; 5	15; 13

Scotland V/s Australia

Scotland
5

2 December 2004

Australia
0

			1	2	3
1	(Scotland) (Australia)	Calum Menzies; Jeff Tho	15; 10	15; 9
2	(Scotland) (Australia)	Julie Boyd; Erin Carroll	11; 9	11; 3
3	(Scotland) (Australia)	Stuart Gilliland / Calum Menzies; Jeff Tho / Raymond Tam	15; 12	10; 15	15; 6
4	(Scotland) (Australia)	Imogen Bankier / Emma Mason; Erin Carroll / Erica Pong	15; 4	15; 6
5	(Scotland) (Australia)	Watson Briggs / Imogen Bankier; Tiger Chen / Sue Li Yong	15; 4	15; 6

=== Pool B ===
England V/s New Zealand

England
5

1 December 2004

New Zealand
0

			1	2	3
1	(England) (New Zealand)	Rajiv Ouseph; Chan Yun Lung	15; 8	15; 9
2	(England) (New Zealand)	Helen Ward; Michelle Chan	11; 4	11; 6
3	(England) (New Zealand)	Andrew Ellis / Dean George; Henry Tam / Joe Wu	15; 3	9; 15	15; 6
4	(England) (New Zealand)	Heather Olver / Jenny Wallwork; Michelle Chan / Belinda Hill	15; 12	15; 11
5	(England) (New Zealand)	Dean George / Heather Olver; Henry Tam / Belinda Hill	15; 8	15; 7

India V/s South Africa

India
5

1 December 2004

South Africa
0

			1	2	3
1	(India) (South Africa)	Anand Pawar; Richard Anderton	15; 6	15; 0
2	(India) (South Africa)	Saina Nehwal; Annari Viljoen				not played
3	(India) (South Africa)	Sagar Chopda / Jishnu Sanyal; Richard Anderton / Rowen Brown	15; 5	15; 4
4	(India) (South Africa)	Aparna Balan / Saina Nehwal; Stacey Doubell / Annari Viljoen				not played
5	(India) (South Africa)	Sagar Chopda / Aparna Balan; Richard Anderton / Stacey Doubell	15; 8	15; 5

England V/s South Africa

England
5

1 December 2004

South Africa
0

			1	2	3
1	(England) (South Africa)	Rajiv Ouseph; Richard Anderton	15; 4	15; 6
2	(England) (South Africa)	Helen Ward; Stacey Doubell	11; 9	11; 2
3	(England) (South Africa)	Andrew Ellis / Dean George; Richard Anderton / Rowen Brown	15; 2	15; 8
4	(England) (South Africa)	Heather Olver / Jenny Wallwork; Stacey Doubell / Annari Viljoen				not played
5	(England) (South Africa)	Rajiv Ouseph / Jenny Wallwork; Rowen Brown / Annari Viljoen				not played

India V/s New Zealand

India
5

1 December 2004

New Zealand
0

			1	2	3
1	(India) (New Zealand)	Anand Pawar; Chan Yun Lung	15; 5	15; 5
2	(India) (New Zealand)	Saina Nehwal; Michelle Chan	11; 4	11; 1
3	(India) (New Zealand)	Sagar Chopda / Jishnu Sanyal; Henry Tam / Joe Wu	9; 15	15; 4	15; 11
4	(India) (New Zealand)	Aparna Balan / Saina Nehwal; Michelle Chan / Belinda Hill	15; 6	15; 1
5	(India) (New Zealand)	Anand Pawar / Aparna Balan; Henry Tam / Belinda Hill	15; 4	15; 8

England V/s India

England
2

2 December 2004

India
3

			1	2	3
1	(England) (India)	Rajiv Ouseph; Anand Pawar	17; 14	11; 15	11; 15
2	(England) (India)	Helen Ward; Saina Nehwal	1; 11	1; 11
3	(England) (India)	Andrew Ellis / Dean George; Sagar Chopda / Jishnu Sanyal	15; 13	15; 7
4	(England) (India)	Heather Olver / Jenny Wallwork; Aparna Balan / Saina Nehwal	15; 8	11; 15	8; 15
5	(England) (India)	Rajiv Ouseph / Jenny Wallwork; Anand Pawar / Aparna Balan	15; 11	15; 4

New Zealand V/s South Africa

New Zealand
5

2 December 2004

South Africa
0

			1	2	3
1	(New Zealand) (South Africa)	Chan Yun Lung; Richard Anderton	11; 15	15; 9	15; 5
2	(New Zealand) (South Africa)	Michelle Chan; Stacey Doubell	13; 11	11; 5
3	(New Zealand) (South Africa)	Henry Tam / Joe Wu; Richard Anderton / Rowen Brown	15; 7	15; 2
4	(New Zealand) (South Africa)	Michelle Chan / Belinda Hill; Stacey Doubell / Annari Viljoen	15; 7	15; 12
5	(New Zealand) (South Africa)	Joe Wu / Garbo Choi; Rowen Brown / Annari Viljoen	15; 12	15; 13

== Interpool matches ==
Scotland V/s South Africa

Scotland
5

2 December 2004

South Africa
0

			1	2	3
1	(Scotland) (South Africa)	Calum Menzies; Richard Anderton	15; 3	15; 3
2	(Scotland) (South Africa)	Julie Boyd; Stacey Doubell	11; 1	11; 2
3	(Scotland) (South Africa)	Stuart Gilliland / Calum Menzies; Richard Anderton / Rowen Brown	17; 14	15; 10
4	(Scotland) (South Africa)	Imogen Bankier / Emma Mason; Stacey Doubell / Annari Viljoen	15; 7	15; 2
5	(Scotland) (South Africa)	Watson Briggs / Imogen Bankier; Rowen Brown / Annari Viljoen	15; 7	15; 6

New Zealand V/s Australia

New Zealand
3

2 December 2004

Australia
1

			1	2	3
1	(New Zealand) (Australia)	Chan Yun Lung; Tiger Chen	13; 15	15; 3	15; 6
2	(New Zealand) (Australia)	Michelle Chan; Erin Carroll	11; 6	11; 6
3	(New Zealand) (Australia)	Michelle Chan / Belinda Hill; Erin Carroll / Sue Li Hong	15; 11	15; 17	8; 15
4	(New Zealand) (Australia)	Henry Tam / Belinda Hill; Tiger Chen / Sue Li Yong	15; 9	15; 7

== Classification matches ==
- 5th and 6th place : Scotland V/s New Zealand

Scotland
4

3 December 2004

New Zealand
1

			1	2	3
1	(Scotland) (New Zealand)	Calum Menzies; Chan Yun Lung	15; 7	15; 8
2	(Scotland) (New Zealand)	Julie Boyd; Michelle Chan	5; 11	11; 8	11; 5
3	(Scotland) (New Zealand)	Stuart Gilliland / Calum Menzies; Henry Tam / Joe Wu	9; 15	17; 15	14; 17
4	(Scotland) (New Zealand)	Imogen Bankier / Emma Mason; Michelle Chan / Belinda Hill	17; 15	15; 17	15; 8
5	(Scotland) (New Zealand)	Watson Briggs / Imogen Bankier; Henry Tam / Belinda Hill	15; 13	15; 10

- 7th and 8th place : Australia V/s South Africa

Australia
3

3 December 2004

South Africa
1

			1	2	3
1	(Australia) (South Africa)	Tiger Chen; Richard Anderton	15; 2	15; 4
2	(Australia) (South Africa)	Erica Pong; Stacey Doubell	11; 9	11; 3
3	(Australia) (South Africa)	Erin Carroll / Sue Li Hong; Stacey Doubell / Annari Viljoen	7; 15	15; 10	9; 15
4	(Australia) (South Africa)	Raymond Tam / Sue Li Hong; Rowen Brown / Annari Viljoen	15; 4	15; 8

== Semifinals ==
Malaysia V/s England

Malaysia
3

2 December 2004

England
0

			1	2	3
1	(Malaysia) (England)	Lyddia Cheah; Helen Ward	11; 7	11; 7
2	(Malaysia) (England)	Hoon Thien How / Tan Boon Heong; Andrew Ellis / Dean George	15; 6	15; 5
3	(Malaysia) (England)	Hoon Thien How / Ng Hui Lin; Rajiv Ouseph / Jenny Wallwork	16; 17	15; 9	15; 8

India V/s Singapore

India
3

2 December 2004

Singapore
1

			1	2	3
1	(India) (Singapore)	Anand Pawar; Chew Swee Hau	17; 16	13; 15	8; 15
2	(India) (Singapore)	Saina Nehwal; Colleen Goh	11; 0	11; 1
3	(India) (Singapore)	Aparna Balan / Saina Nehwal; Vanessa Neo / Karen Yuen	15; 2	15; 6
4	(India) (Singapore)	Sagar Chopda / Aparna Balan; Koh Yan Sen / Vanessa Neo	15; 12	7; 15	15; 9

== Bronze medal match ==
England V/s Singapore

England
3

3 December 2004

Singapore
1

			1	2	3
1	(England) (Singapore)	Rajiv Ouseph; Chew Swee Hau	15; 6	15; 6
2	(England) (Singapore)	Helen Ward; Colleen Goh	6; 11	7; 11
3	(England) (Singapore)	Andrew Ellis / Dean George; Koh Yan Sen / Aaron Tan	15; 7	15; 11
4	(England) (Singapore)	Rajiv Ouseph / Jenny Wallwork; Koh Yan Sen / Vanessa Neo	15; 11	15; 7

== Final tie ==
Malaysia V/s India

Malaysia
3

3 December 2004

India
2

			1	2	3
1	(Malaysia) (India)	Azrihanif Azahar; Anand Pawar	15; 11	15; 7
2	(Malaysia) (India)	Lyddia Cheah; Saina Nehwal	5; 11	1; 11
3	(Malaysia) (India)	Hoon Thien How / Tan Boon Heong; Sagar Chopda / Jishnu Sanyal	15; 2	15; 5
4	(Malaysia) (India)	Ng Hui Lin / Woon Khe Wei; Aparna Balan / Saina Nehwal	13; 15	15; 6	10; 15
5	(Malaysia) (India)	Hoon Thien How / Ng Hui Lin; Sagar Chopda / Aparna Balan	15; 8	14; 17	15; 12

== Final classification ==
Position	Country
1	Malaysia
2	India
3	England
4	Singapore
5	Scotland
6	New Zealand
7	Australia
8	South Africa
