= 2008 Thomas & Uber Cup Preliminaries for Oceania =

Tournament details
- Dates: 8 February
- Nations: 2 (Men's team); 2 (Women's team)
- Venue: Salle Veyret
- Location: Nouméa, New Caledonia

The 2008 Thomas & Uber Cup Preliminaries for Oceania was a continental badminton team championships in Oceania sanctioned by the Badminton World Federation. The tournament was held on 8 February 2008.

== Tournament ==
The 2008 Thomas & Uber Cup Preliminaries for Oceania was a continental team tournament of badminton held to determine the best men's and women's team in Oceania, who would qualify to 2008 Thomas & Uber Cup. This tournament was organized by Badminton Oceania and was sanctioned by the Badminton World Federation.

=== Venue ===
The tournament was held at Salle Veyret in Nouméa, New Caledonia.

=== Competition format ===
The competition was held using a half-competition system (round-robin) with each team competing against each other once.

=== Tiebreakers ===
The rankings of teams in each group were determined per BWF Statutes Section 5.1, Article 16.3:

1. Number of matches won;
2. Match result between the teams in question;
3. Match difference in all group matches;
4. Game difference in all group matches;
5. Point difference in all group matches.

== Men's team ==
=== New Zealand vs Australia ===
New Zealand
3
Salle Veyret, Court 1
8 February 2008, 10:00 UTC+11

Australia
2

			1	2	3
1	(New Zealand) (Australia)	John Moody; Stuart Gomez	21; 19	21; 17
2	(New Zealand) (Australia)	Joe Wu; Jeff Tho	14; 21	24; 22	21; 16
3	(New Zealand) (Australia)	Ethan Haggo; Benjamin Walklate	14; 21	14; 21
4	(New Zealand) (Australia)	Nathan Hannam / Henry Tam; Ross Smith / Glenn Warfe	15; 21	18; 21
5	(New Zealand) (Australia)	Craig Cooper / John Moody; Ashley Brehaut / Stuart Gomez	21; 15	21; 14

== Women's team ==
=== New Zealand vs Australia ===
New Zealand
3
Salle Veyret, Court 1
8 February 2008, 17:00 UTC+11

Australia
0

			1	2	3
1	(New Zealand) (Australia)	Rachel Hindley; Erin Carroll	21; 9	21; 12
2	(New Zealand) (Australia)	Michelle Chan; Leanne Choo	21; 11	21; 9
3	(New Zealand) (Australia)	Jessica Jonggowisastro; Leisha Cooper	21; 15	21; 12
4	(New Zealand) (Australia)	Donna Cranston / Emma Rodgers; Leanne Choo / Eugenia Tanaka				not played
5	(New Zealand) (Australia)	Renee Flavell / Danielle Tahuri; Erin Carroll / Leisha Cooper				not played
