= 2014 Thomas & Uber Cup squads =

This article lists the confirmed squads lists for badminton's 2014 Thomas & Uber Cup.

== Thomas Cup ==
=== Group A ===
==== Indonesia ====
Name	DoB/Age	Singles Rank	Doubles Rank
Mohammad Ahsan	7 September 1987 (aged 26)	-	1
Berry Angriawan	3 October 1991 (aged 22)	-	25
Ihsan Maulana Mustofa	18 November 1995 (aged 18)	203	-
Angga Pratama	5 December 1991 (aged 22)	-	11
Dionysius Hayom Rumbaka	22 October 1988 (aged 25)	19	-
Simon Santoso	29 July 1985 (aged 28)	34	-
Rian Agung Saputro	25 June 1990 (aged 23)	-	11
Hendra Setiawan	25 August 1984 (aged 29)	-	1
Tommy Sugiarto	31 May 1988 (aged 25)	5	-
Ricky Karanda Suwardi	21 January 1992 (aged 22)	-	25

==== Thailand ====
Name	DoB/Age	Singles Rank	Doubles Rank
Wannawat Ampunsuwan	15 July 1993 (aged 20)	-	33
Suppanyu Avihingsanon	24 October 1989 (aged 24)	57	-
Patiphat Chalardchaleam	9 July 1987 (aged 26)	-	33
Maneepong Jongjit	21 March 1991 (aged 23)	-	14
Boonsak Ponsana	22 February 1982 (aged 32)	8	-
Sudket Prapakamol	8 February 1980 (aged 34)	-	175
Nipitphon Puangpuapech	31 May 1991 (aged 22)	-	14
Tanongsak Saensomboonsuk	13 October 1990 (aged 23)	22	-
Thammasin Sitthikom	7 April 1995 (aged 19)	121	-

==== Singapore ====
Name	DoB/Age	Singles Rank	Doubles Rank
Danny Bawa Chrisnanta	30 December 1988 (aged 25)	-	61
Terry Hee Yong Kai	6 July 1995 (aged 18)	-	116
Huang Chao	30 June 1992 (aged 21)	172	354
Sean Lee Kwan Ting	7 October 1995 (aged 18)	383	229
Chayut Triyachart	9 October 1989 (aged 24)	-	61
Derek Wong Zi Liang	13 January 1989 (aged 25)	41	342

==== Nigeria ====
Name	DoB/Age	Singles Rank	Doubles Rank
Enejoh Abah	16 February 1990 (aged 24)	168	124
Jinkan Ifraimu Bulus	13 December 1988 (aged 25)	239	210
Ola Fagbemi	20 October 1984 (aged 29)	959	210
Victor Makanju	22 March 1985 (aged 29)	222	124

=== Group B ===
==== Japan ====
Name	DoB/Age	Singles Rank	Doubles Rank
Hiroyuki Endo	16 December 1986 (aged 27)	-	3
Hirokatsu Hashimoto	18 December 1985 (aged 28)	-	16
Kenichi Hayakawa	5 April 1986 (aged 28)	-	3
Noriyasu Hirata	17 November 1983 (aged 30)	-	16
Takeshi Kamura	14 February 1990 (aged 24)	-	13
Kento Momota	1 September 1994 (aged 19)	14	-
Sho Sasaki	30 June 1982 (aged 31)	17	-
Keigo Sonoda	20 February 1990 (aged 24)	-	13
Kenichi Tago	16 July 1989 (aged 24)	4	-
Takuma Ueda	21 March 1989 (aged 25)	25	-

==== Denmark ====
Name	DoB/Age	Singles Rank	Doubles Rank
Viktor Axelsen	4 January 1994 (aged 20)	15	-
Mads Conrad-Petersen	12 January 1988 (aged 26)	-	17
Emil Holst	9 January 1991 (aged 23)	55	430
Jan Ø. Jørgensen	31 December 1987 (aged 26)	3	-
Mads Pieler Kolding	27 January 1988 (aged 26)	-	17
Carsten Mogensen	24 July 1983 (aged 30)	-	2
Joachim Fischer Nielsen	23 November 1978 (aged 35)	-	-
Anders Skaarup Rasmussen	15 February 1989 (aged 25)	1906	23
Kim Astrup Sorensen	6 March 1992 (aged 22)	-	23
Hans-Kristian Vittinghus	16 January 1986 (aged 28)	12	-

==== Hong Kong ====
Name	DoB/Age	Singles Rank	Doubles Rank
Chan Yun Lung	29 February 1988 (aged 26)	-	37
Hu Yun	31 August 1981 (aged 32)	11	-
Law Cheuk Him	26 February 1994 (aged 20)	-	140
Lee Chun Hei	25 January 1994 (aged 20)	-	37
Lo Lok Kei	~1990	-	134
Ng Ka Long	24 June 1994 (aged 19)	83	222
Tang Chun Man	20 March 1995 (aged 19)	-	269
Wei Nan	4 January 1984 (aged 30)	28	-
Wong Wing Ki	18 March 1990 (aged 24)	39	-

==== England ====
Name	DoB/Age	Singles Rank	Doubles Rank
Chris Adcock	27 April 1989 (aged 25)	-	9
Andrew Ellis	21 January 1987 (aged 27)	-	9
Marcus Ellis	14 September 1989 (aged 24)	-	102
Chris Langridge	2 May 1985 (aged 29)	-	21
Peter Mills	31 March 1988 (aged 26)	-	21
Rajiv Ouseph	30 August 1986 (aged 27)	23	-
Sam Parsons	23 August 1995 (aged 18)	219	455
Toby Penty	12 August 1992 (aged 21)	141	-
Rhys Walker	26 January 1994 (aged 20)	180	-

=== Group C ===
==== Malaysia ====
Name	DoB/Age	Singles Rank	Doubles Rank
Chan Peng Soon	27 April 1988 (aged 26)	-	-
Chong Wei Feng	26 May 1987 (aged 26)	27	-
Goh Soon Huat	27 June 1990 (aged 23)	133	-
Goh V Shem	20 May 1989 (aged 24)	-	20
Hoon Thien How	24 December 1986 (aged 27)	-	7
Lee Chong Wei	21 October 1982 (aged 31)	1	-
Daren Liew	6 August 1987 (aged 26)	66	-
Lim Khim Wah	29 April 1989 (aged 25)	-	20
Tan Boon Heong	18 September 1987 (aged 26)	-	24
Tan Wee Kiong	21 May 1989 (aged 24)	-	7

==== South Korea ====
Name	DoB/Age	Singles Rank	Doubles Rank
Hwang Jong-soo	31 March 1988 (aged 26)	102	-
Kim Ki-jung	14 August 1990 (aged 23)	-	4
Kim Sa-rang	22 August 1989 (aged 24)	-	4
Ko Sung-hyun	21 May 1987 (aged 26)	-	18
Lee Dong-keun	20 November 1990 (aged 23)	32	-
Lee Yong-dae	11 September 1988 (aged 25)	-	10
Park Sung-min	12 May 1990 (aged 24)	177	-
Shin Baek-cheol	19 October 1989 (aged 24)	-	18
Shon Wan-ho	17 May 1988 (aged 26)	9	-
Yoo Yeon-seong	19 August 1986 (aged 27)	-	10

==== India ====
Name	DoB/Age	Singles Rank	Doubles Rank
Manu Attri	31 December 1992 (aged 21)	-	46
Sai Praneeth Bhamidipati	10 August 1992 (aged 21)	51	-
Pranav Chopra	6 September 1992 (aged 21)	-	49
Akshay Dewalkar	2 July 1988 (aged 25)	-	49
Rajah Menuri Venkata Gurusaidutt	1 March 1990 (aged 24)	30	-
Srikanth Kidambi	7 February 1993 (aged 21)	18	-
Kashyap Parupalli	8 September 1986 (aged 27)	21	-
Sumeeth Reddy B.	26 September 1991 (aged 22)	-	46
Sourabh Varma	30 December 1992 (aged 21)	35	-
Arun Vishnu	2 August 1988 (aged 25)	-	78

==== Germany ====
Name	DoB/Age	Singles Rank	Doubles Rank
Dieter Domke	9 February 1987 (aged 27)	59	-
Michael Fuchs	22 April 1982 (aged 32)	-	28
Andreas Heinz	5 April 1991 (aged 23)	-	82
Peter Kaesbauer	17 March 1988 (aged 26)	-	40
Kai Schaefer	13 June 1993 (aged 20)	261	-
Lukas Schmidt	19 September 1988 (aged 25)	80	-
Johannes Schoettler	27 August 1984 (aged 29)	-	28
Max Schwenger	28 April 1992 (aged 22)	-	82
Josche Zurwonne	23 March 1989 (aged 25)	-	40
Marc Zwiebler	13 March 1984 (aged 30)	13	-

=== Group D ===
==== China ====
Name	DoB/Age	Singles Rank	Doubles Rank
Chai Biao	10 October 1990 (aged 23)	-	15
Chen Long	18 January 1989 (aged 25)	2	-
Du Pengyu	22 January 1988 (aged 26)	6	-
Fu Haifeng	23 August 1983 (aged 30)	-	47
Hong Wei	4 October 1989 (aged 24)	-	15
Lin Dan	14 October 1983 (aged 30)	58	-
Liu Xiaolong	12 May 1988 (aged 26)	-	6
Qiu Zihan	17 January 1991 (aged 23)	-	6
Tian Houwei	11 January 1992 (aged 22)	16	-
Zhang Nan	1 March 1990 (aged 24)	-	63

==== Chinese Taipei ====
Name	DoB/Age	Singles Rank	Doubles Rank
Chen Hung-ling	10 February 1986 (aged 28)	-	29
Chou Tien-chen	8 January 1990 (aged 24)	24	-
Hsu Jen-hao	26 October 1991 (aged 22)	26	236
Lee Sheng-mu	3 October 1986 (aged 27)	-	5
Liao Min-chun	27 January 1988 (aged 26)	-	93
Lin Yu-hsien	27 September 1991 (aged 22)	89	373
Lu Chia-bin	24 February 1990 (aged 24)	-	29
Shih Kuei-chun		106	183
Tsai Chia-hsin	25 July 1982 (aged 31)	-	5
Tseng Min-hao	15 June 1988 (aged 25)	-	93

==== Russia ====
Name	DoB/Age	Singles Rank	Doubles Rank
Anton Ivanov	19 November 1987 (aged 26)	126	668
Vladimir Ivanov	3 July 1987 (aged 26)	36	12
Rodion Kargaev	9 September 1994 (aged 19)	-	106
Vladimir Malkov	9 April 1986 (aged 28)	52	171
Nikolaj Nikolaenko	29 January 1978 (aged 36)	-	160
Ivan Sozonov	6 July 1989 (aged 24)	1905	12
Anatoliy Yartsev	16 January 1993 (aged 21)	189	106

==== France ====
Name	DoB/Age	Singles Rank	Doubles Rank
Baptiste Careme	25 October 1985 (aged 28)	-	39
Lucas Claerbout	22 October 1992 (aged 21)	112	405
Laurent Constantin	10 June 1988 (aged 25)	-	72
Lucas Corvee	9 June 1993 (aged 20)	63	54
Bastian Kersaudy	6 September 1994 (aged 19)	-	66
Ronan Labar	3 May 1989 (aged 25)	-	39
Brice Leverdez	9 April 1986 (aged 28)	31	54
Matthieu Lo Ying Ping	3 August 1986 (aged 27)	122	72
Gaetan Mittelheisser	26 July 1993 (aged 20)	-	66
Thomas Rouxel	26 May 1991 (aged 22)	78	553

== Uber Cup ==
=== Group W ===
==== China ====
Name	DoB/Age	Singles Rank	Doubles Rank
Bao Yixin	29 September 1992 (aged 21)	-	2
Li Xuerui	24 January 1991 (aged 23)	1	-
Ma Jin	7 May 1988 (aged 26)	-	13
Sun Yu	28 February 1994 (aged 20)	37	-
Tang Jinhua	8 January 1992 (aged 22)	-	2
Tian Qing	19 August 1986 (aged 27)	-	11
Wang Shixian	13 February 1990 (aged 24)	2	-
Wang Xiaoli	24 June 1989 (aged 24)	-	1
Wang Yihan	18 January 1988 (aged 26)	3	-
Zhao Yunlei	25 August 1986 (aged 27)	-	11

==== Chinese Taipei ====
Name	DoB/Age	Singles Rank	Doubles Rank
Cheng Wen-hsing	24 February 1982 (aged 32)	-	20
Hsieh Pei-chen	31 January 1988 (aged 26)	-	20
Kuo Yu-wen	5 November 1991 (aged 22)	-	106
Lee Chia-hsin	14 May 1997 (aged 17)	75	114
Pai Hsiao-ma	7 May 1986 (aged 28)	27	-
Pai Yu-po	18 April 1991 (aged 23)	80	136
Tai Tzu-ying	20 June 1994 (aged 19)	7	-
Wang Pei-rong	17 January 1985 (aged 29)	-	106
Wu Ti-jung	23 March 1993 (aged 21)	-	114

==== England ====
Name	DoB/Age	Singles Rank	Doubles Rank
Gabrielle Adcock	30 September 1990 (aged 23)	-	24
Nicola Cerfontyne	12 September 1987 (aged 26)	113	-
Fontaine Mica Chapman	2 January 1990 (aged 24)	73	423
Alyssa Lim	23 January 1991 (aged 23)	-	101
Heather Olver	15 March 1986 (aged 28)	-	31
Panuga Riou	13 March 1992 (aged 22)	98	-
Kate Robertshaw	13 September 1990 (aged 23)	-	31
Lauren Smith	26 September 1991 (aged 22)	-	24
Sarah Walker	22 November 1989 (aged 24)	74	-

==== Russia ====
Name	DoB/Age	Singles Rank	Doubles Rank
Ekaterina Bolotova	12 December 1992 (aged 21)	154	67
Anastasia Chervaykova	14 June 1992 (aged 21)	100	42
Ella Diehl	5 August 1978 (aged 35)	126	-
Evgeniya Kosetskaya	16 November 1994 (aged 19)	103	115
Natalia Perminova	14 November 1991 (aged 22)	42	-
Ksenia Polikarpova	11 March 1990 (aged 24)	60	49
Nina Vislova	4 October 1986 (aged 27)	-	42

=== Group X ===
==== South Korea ====
Name	DoB/Age	Singles Rank	Doubles Rank
Bae Youn-joo	26 October 1990 (aged 23)	6	-
Jang Ye-na	13 December 1989 (aged 24)	-	6
Jung Kyung-eun	20 March 1990 (aged 24)	-	8
Kim Ha-na	17 December 1989 (aged 24)	-	8
Kim Hyo-min	8 December 1995 (aged 18)	78	-
Kim So-young	9 July 1992 (aged 21)	-	6
Ko A-ra	21 September 1992 (aged 21)	-	14
Lee Min-ji	14 April 1995 (aged 19)	214	-
Sung Ji-hyun	29 July 1991 (aged 22)	5	-
Yoo Hae-won	7 November 1992 (aged 21)	-	14

==== Indonesia ====
Name	DoB/Age	Singles Rank	Doubles Rank
Suci Rizki Andini	26 March 1993 (aged 21)	-	56
Pia Zebadiah Bernadeth	22 January 1989 (aged 25)	-	10
Lindaweni Fanetri	18 January 1990 (aged 24)	23	-
Adriyanti Firdasari	16 December 1986 (aged 27)	82	-
Maria Febe Kusumastuti	30 September 1989 (aged 24)	43	-
Nitya Krishinda Maheswari	16 December 1988 (aged 25)	-	9
Bellaetrix Manuputty	11 October 1988 (aged 25)	24	-
Tiara Rosalia Nuraidah	27 June 1993 (aged 20)	-	56
Greysia Polii	11 August 1987 (aged 26)	-	9
Rizki Amelia Pradipta	1 September 1990 (aged 23)	-	10

==== Singapore ====
Name	DoB/Age	Singles Rank	Doubles Rank
Chen Jiayuan	16 February 1991 (aged 23)	58	336
Fu Mingtian	27 June 1990 (aged 23)	-	37
Liang Xiaoyu	11 January 1996 (aged 18)	220	423
Vanessa Neo Yu Yan	19 June 1987 (aged 26)	-	37
Shinta Mulia Sari	14 June 1988 (aged 25)	-	16
Tan Wei Han	16 July 1993 (aged 20)	-	174
Yao Lei	24 February 1990 (aged 24)	-	16

==== Australia ====
Name	DoB/Age	Singles Rank	Doubles Rank
Jacqueline Guan	3 November 1994 (aged 19)	-	50
Verdet Kessler	24 May 1994 (aged 19)	169	190
Joy Lai	18 August 1998 (aged 15)	187	190
Tara Pilven	2 August 1993 (aged 20)	105	155
Gronya Somerville	10 May 1995 (aged 19)	-	50
Tang Hetian	5 January 1975 (aged 39)	-	46
Renuga Veeran	20 June 1986 (aged 27)	-	46
Alice Wu	12 July 1998 (aged 15)	216	204

=== Group Y ===
==== Thailand ====
Name	DoB/Age	Singles Rank	Doubles Rank
Savitree Amitrapai	19 November 1988 (aged 25)	-	26
Duanganong Aroonkesorn	6 February 1984 (aged 30)	-	12
Porntip Buranaprasertsuk	24 October 1991 (aged 22)	9	112
Ratchanok Inthanon	5 February 1995 (aged 19)	4	-
Nichaon Jindapon	31 March 1991 (aged 23)	15	-
Busanan Ongbumrungpan	22 March 1996 (aged 18)	17	112
Puttita Supajirakul	29 May 1996 (aged 17)	-	41
Sapsiree Taerattanachai	18 April 1992 (aged 22)	61	41
Saralee Thungthongkam	13 June 1979 (aged 34)	-	135
Kunchala Voravichitchaikul	14 November 1984 (aged 29)	-	12

==== India ====
Name	DoB/Age	Singles Rank	Doubles Rank
Aparna Balan	9 August 1986 (aged 27)	-	173
Pradnya Gadre	17 October 1990 (aged 23)	-	87
Sayali Gokhale	1 February 1987 (aged 27)	133	-
Jwala Gutta	7 September 1983 (aged 30)	-	36
Tanvi Lad	30 January 1993 (aged 21)	57	-
Saina Nehwal	17 March 1990 (aged 24)	8	-
Ashwini Ponnappa	18 September 1989 (aged 24)	-	36
Siki Reddy N.	18 August 1993 (aged 20)	-	87
Pusarla Venkata Sindhu	5 July 1995 (aged 18)	11	-
Puthenpurayil Chandrika Thulasi	31 August 1991 (aged 22)	65	-

==== Hong Kong ====
Name	DoB/Age	Singles Rank	Doubles Rank
Chan Hung Yung	18 February 1990 (aged 24)	-	88
Chan Tsz Ka	10 February 1990 (aged 24)	31	94
Chau Hoi Wah	5 June 1986 (aged 27)	-	85
Cheung Ngan Yi	27 April 1993 (aged 21)	137	-
Cheung Ying Mei	4 April 1994 (aged 20)	434	336
Poon Lok Yan	22 August 1991 (aged 22)	-	35
Tse Ying Suet	9 November 1990 (aged 23)	-	35
Yip Pui Yin	6 August 1987 (aged 26)	21	-
Yuen Sin Ying	13 January 1994 (aged 20)	-	88

==== Canada ====
Name	DoB/Age	Singles Rank	Doubles Rank
Alex Bruce	27 May 1990 (aged 23)	-	82
Phyllis Chan	18 July 1991 (aged 22)	-	82
Grace Gao	17 October 1989 (aged 24)	-	90
Rachael Honderich	21 April 1996 (aged 18)	339	-
Joycelyn Ko	10 January 1986 (aged 28)	218	232
Brittney Tam	23 August 1997 (aged 16)	-	-

=== Group Z ===
==== Japan ====
Name	DoB/Age	Singles Rank	Doubles Rank
Eriko Hirose	16 March 1985 (aged 29)	16	-
Reika Kakiiwa	19 July 1989 (aged 24)	-	5
Miyuki Maeda	14 October 1985 (aged 28)	-	5
Shizuka Matsuo	24 November 1986 (aged 27)	-	93
Misaki Matsutomo	8 February 1992 (aged 22)	-	4
Minatsu Mitani	4 September 1991 (aged 22)	12	-
Mami Naito	25 December 1986 (aged 27)	-	93
Ayaka Takahashi	19 April 1990 (aged 24)	-	4
Sayaka Takahashi	29 July 1992 (aged 21)	13	-
Akane Yamaguchi	6 June 1997 (aged 16)	84	-

==== Denmark ====
Name	DoB/Age	Singles Rank	Doubles Rank
Mia Blichfeldt	19 August 1997 (aged 16)	182	562
Lena Grebak	18 September 1991 (aged 22)	-	47
Sandra-Maria Jensen	5 April 1994 (aged 20)	68	875
Kamilla Rytter Juhl	23 November 1983 (aged 30)	-	3
Line Kjaersfeldt	20 April 1994 (aged 20)	45	-
Line Damkjaer Kruse	7 January 1988 (aged 26)	-	17
Anna Thea Madsen	27 October 1994 (aged 19)	52	-
Christinna Pedersen	12 May 1986 (aged 28)	-	3
Marie Roepke	19 June 1987 (aged 26)	-	17

==== Germany ====
Name	DoB/Age	Singles Rank	Doubles Rank
Fabienne Deprez	8 February 1992 (aged 22)	166	-
Anika Doerr	15 June 1994 (aged 19)	245	309
Johanna Goliszewski	9 May 1986 (aged 28)	-	29
Alina Hammes	4 February 1992 (aged 22)	223	423
Isabel Herttrich	17 March 1992 (aged 22)	-	39
Kira Kattenbeck	2 August 1992 (aged 21)	-	81
Yvonne Li	30 May 1998 (aged 15)	585	-
Birgit Michels	28 September 1984 (aged 29)	1049	29
Carla Nelte	21 September 1990 (aged 23)	-	39
Karin Schnaase	14 February 1985 (aged 29)	36	-

==== Malaysia ====
Name	DoB/Age	Singles Rank	Doubles Rank
Amelia Alicia Anscelly	26 April 1988 (aged 26)	-	30
Vivian Hoo Kah Mun	19 March 1990 (aged 24)	-	23
Lee Meng Yean	30 March 1994 (aged 20)	-	44
Lim Chiew Sien	14 May 1994 (aged 20)	177	-
Lim Yin Fun	13 November 1994 (aged 19)	152	-
Lim Yin Loo	24 September 1988 (aged 25)	-	44
Soong Fie Cho	5 January 1989 (aged 25)	-	30
Tee Jing Yi	8 February 1991 (aged 23)	50	-
Woon Khe Wei	18 March 1988 (aged 26)	-	23
Yang Li Lian	26 January 1993 (aged 21)	99	-
