= 2014 Oceania Badminton Championships =

Tournament details
- Dates: 10–15 February 2014
- Venue: Ken Kay Badminton Stadium
- Location: Ballarat, Australia

The 2014 Badminton Oceania Championships was the 9th tournament of the Oceania Badminton Championships. It was held in Ballarat, Australia from February 10 to February 15, 2014.

== Venue ==
Ken Kay Badminton Stadium

== Medalists ==
=== Individual event ===
Event	Gold	Silver	Bronze
Men's singles	(Australia) Jeff Tho	(Australia) Ashwant Gobinathan	(New Zealand) Joe Wu
Men's singles	(Australia) Jeff Tho	(Australia) Ashwant Gobinathan	(Australia) Luke Chong
Women's singles	(Australia) Verdet Kessler	(New Zealand) Michelle Chan Ky	(Australia) Joy Lai
Women's singles	(Australia) Verdet Kessler	(New Zealand) Michelle Chan Ky	(Australia) Tara Pilven
Men's doubles	(Australia) Raymond Tam (Australia) Glenn Warfe	(Australia) Matthew Chau (Australia) Sawan Serasinghe	(New Zealand) Kevin Dennerly-Minturn (New Zealand) Oliver Leydon-Davis
Men's doubles	(Australia) Raymond Tam (Australia) Glenn Warfe	(Australia) Matthew Chau (Australia) Sawan Serasinghe	(Australia) Luke Chong (Australia) Joel Findlay
Women's doubles	(Australia) Jacqueline Guan (Australia) Gronya Somerville	(Australia) Jacinta Joe (Australia) Louisa Ma	(Australia) He Tian Tang (Australia) Renuga Veeran
Women's doubles	(Australia) Jacqueline Guan (Australia) Gronya Somerville	(Australia) Jacinta Joe (Australia) Louisa Ma	(Australia) Tara Pilven (Australia) Talia Saunders
Mixed doubles	(New Zealand) Oliver Leydon-Davis (New Zealand) Susannah Leydon-Davis	(Australia) Matthew Chau (Australia) Jacqueline Guan	(Australia) Luke Chong (Australia) Talia Saunders
Mixed doubles	(New Zealand) Oliver Leydon-Davis (New Zealand) Susannah Leydon-Davis	(Australia) Matthew Chau (Australia) Jacqueline Guan	(Australia) Raymond Tam (Australia) Gronya Somerville

=== Team Event ===
Event	Gold	Silver	Bronze
Mixed Team	Australia; Matthew Chau, Ashwant Gobinathan, Daniel Guda, Anthony Joe, Sawan Serasinghe, Ross Smith, Raymond Tam, Glenn Warfe, Jacqueline Guan, Verder Kessler, Joy Lai, Tara Pilven, Gronya Somerville, Tang He Tian, Renuga Veeran, Alice Wu	New Zealand; Kevin Dennerly-Minturn, Michael Fowke, Oliver Leydon-Davis, Joe Wu, Michelle Chan Ky, Susannah Leydon-Davis, Anna Rankin, Madeleine Stapleton	New Caledonia; Thibaut Jouannet, Loic Mennesson, Carl Nguela, Julien Pactat, Morgan Paitio, Cathy Camerota, Johanna Kou, Cecilia Moussy

== Medal table ==
Rank	Nation	Gold	Silver	Bronze	Total
1	Australia	5	4	8	17
2	New Zealand	1	2	2	5
3	New Caledonia	0	0	1	1
Totals (3 entries)		6	6	11	23
