= 2015 Oceania Badminton Championships =

Tournament details
- Dates: 12–15 February 2015
- Venue: X-TRM North Harbour Badminton Centre
- Location: North Shore, Auckland

The X 2015 Oceania Badminton Championships was the 10th tournament of the Oceania Badminton Championships. It was held on the North Shore, Auckland, New Zealand from 12 to 15 February 2015.

== Venue ==
The tournament was held at the X-TRM North Harbour Badminton Centre on the North Shore, Auckland, New Zealand.

== Medalists ==
=== Individual event ===
The table below gives an overview of the individual event medal winners at the 2015 Oceania Championships.

Event	Gold	Silver	Bronze
Men's singles	(Australia) Daniel Guda	(New Zealand) Luke Charlesworth	(Australia) Michael Fariman
Men's singles	(Australia) Daniel Guda	(New Zealand) Luke Charlesworth	(Australia) Ashwant Gobinathan
Women's singles	(Australia) Wendy Chen Hsuan-yu	(Australia) Joy Lai	(Australia) Talia Saunders
Women's singles	(Australia) Wendy Chen Hsuan-yu	(Australia) Joy Lai	(Australia) Jennifer Tam
Men's doubles	(Australia) Matthew Chau and Sawan Serasinghe	(New Zealand) Kevin James Dennerly-Minturn and Oliver Leydon-Davis	(New Zealand) Maoni Hu He and Kent Palmer
Men's doubles	(Australia) Matthew Chau and Sawan Serasinghe	(New Zealand) Kevin James Dennerly-Minturn and Oliver Leydon-Davis	(Australia) Anthony Joe and Pit Seng Low
Women's doubles	(Australia) Leanne Choo and Gronya Somerville	(Australia) Talia Saunders and Jennifer Tam	(New Zealand) Emma Chapple and Danielle Tahuri
Women's doubles	(Australia) Leanne Choo and Gronya Somerville	(Australia) Talia Saunders and Jennifer Tam	(Australia) Wendy Chen Hsuan-yu and Louisa Ma
Mixed doubles	(Australia) Robin Middleton and Leanne Choo	(New Zealand) Oliver Leydon-Davis and Danielle Tahuri	(Australia) Matthew Chau and Gronya Somerville
Mixed doubles	(Australia) Robin Middleton and Leanne Choo	(New Zealand) Oliver Leydon-Davis and Danielle Tahuri	(Australia) Michael Fariman and Talia Saunders
