= Ashwant Gobinathan =

Australian badminton player (born 1993)

Personal information
- Born: 8 September 1993 (age 33) Malaysia

Sport
- Country: Australia
- Sport: Badminton
- Handedness: Right

Men's singles & doubles
- Highest ranking: 134 (MS 15 September 2016); 233 (MD 2 June 2011); 323 (XD 22 September 2016)
- BWF profile
Medal record
Men's badminton
Representing Australia
Oceania Championships
Gold medal – first place	2016 Papeete	Men's singles
Silver medal – second place	2014 Ballarat	Men's singles
Bronze medal – third place	2015 North Harbour	Men's singles
Oceania Mixed Team Championships
Gold medal – first place	2014 Ballarat	Mixed team
Gold medal – first place	2019 Melbourne	Mixed team
Oceania Men's Team Championships
Gold medal – first place	2018 Hamilton	Men's team

Ashwant Gobinathan (born 8 September 1993) is an Australian badminton player. He won the men's singles title at the 2016 Oceania Championships, having previously earned a silver medal in 2014, and a bronze medal in 2015.

== Achievements ==
=== Oceania Championships ===
Men's singles
Year	Venue	Opponent	Score	Result
2016	Punaauia University Hall, Papeete, Tahiti	(French Polynesia) Remi Rossi	21–17, 21–16	Gold
2015	X-TRM North Harbour Badminton Centre, Auckland, New Zealand	(New Zealand) Luke Charlesworth	18–21, 21–19, 16–21	Bronze
2014	Ken Kay Badminton Hall, Ballarat, Australia	(Australia) Jeff Tho	13–21, 15–21	Silver

=== BWF International Challenge/Series ===
Men's singles
Year	Tournament	Opponent	Score	Result
2017	Nouméa International	(New Zealand) Dylan Soedjasa	24-22, 21-15	(gold) Winner

BWF International Challenge tournament

BWF International Series tournament
BWF Future Series tournament
