= 2008 Oceania Badminton Championships =

Tournament details
- Dates: 3-8 February 2008
- Venue: Salle Veyret
- Location: Nouméa, New Caledonia

The VI 2008 Oceania Badminton Championships was the 6th edition of the Oceania Badminton Championships. It was held in Nouméa, New Caledonia from 3 to 8 February 2008.

== Medalists ==
=== Individual event ===
New Zealand has won four out of five titles in the individual events. The only consolation for Australia was the men's doubles Smith and Warfe, which they won in two sets beating the New Zealand pairing of Henry Tam and Nathan Hannam. The table below gives an overview of the individual event medal winners at the 2008 Oceania Championships.

Event	Gold	Silver	Bronze
Men's singles	(New Zealand) John Moody	(Australia) Stuart Gomez	(Australia) Jeff Tho
Men's singles	(New Zealand) John Moody	(Australia) Stuart Gomez	(Australia) Benjamin Walklate
Women's singles	(New Zealand) Michelle Chan	(New Zealand) Rachel Hindley	(Australia) Leisha Cooper
Women's singles	(New Zealand) Michelle Chan	(New Zealand) Rachel Hindley	(New Zealand) Jessica Jonggowisastro
Men's doubles	(Australia) Ross Smith and Glenn Warfe	(New Zealand) Nathan Hannam and Henry Tam	(New Zealand) Kevin Dennerly-Minturn and Joe Wu
Men's doubles	(Australia) Ross Smith and Glenn Warfe	(New Zealand) Nathan Hannam and Henry Tam	(New Zealand) James Eunson and Ethan Haggo
Women's doubles	(New Zealand) Michelle Chan and Rachel Hindley	(New Zealand) Renee Flavell and Donna Cranston	(Australia) Erin Carroll and Leisha Cooper
Women's doubles	(New Zealand) Michelle Chan and Rachel Hindley	(New Zealand) Renee Flavell and Donna Cranston	(Australia) Tania Luiz and Eugenia Tanaka
Mixed doubles	(New Zealand) Henry Tam and Donna Cranston	(New Zealand) Craig Cooper and Renee Flavell	(Australia) Benjamin Walklate and Erin Carroll
Mixed doubles	(New Zealand) Henry Tam and Donna Cranston	(New Zealand) Craig Cooper and Renee Flavell	(New Zealand) Kevin Dennerly-Minturn and Emma Rodgers

=== Team Event ===
New Zealand team won the Oceania mixed teams event after lift the Robson Shield tournament. The Men's and Women's team event was the qualifying round of the 2008 Thomas & Uber Cup. New Zealand won the men's and women's team after beat Australia with the score 3-2 in the men's team, and 3-0 in the women's team.

Event	Gold	Silver	Bronze
Mixed team	New Zealand; Alan Bosselman, Craig Cooper, Kevin Dennerly-Minturn, James Eunson, Ethan Haggo, Nathan Hannam, John Moody, Henry Tam, Ellis Thomas, Dylan Tibbo, Joe Wu, Danielle Barry, Michelle Chan, Donna Cranston, Renee Flavell, Rachel Hindley, Jessica Jonggowisastro, Emma Rodgers	Australia; Ashley Brehaut, Matthew Gillie, Stuart Gomez, David Jones, Brent Munday, Ross Smith, Jeff Tho, Benjamin Walklate, Glenn Warfe, Erin Carroll, Leanne Choo, Leisha Cooper, Tania Luiz, Spoorti Rattan, Eugenia Tanaka	New Caledonia; Sebastien Arias, Clement Bertaud, Steeve Bizien, Marc Antoine Desaymoz, Gregory Dongoc, Matthieu Dufermon, Florian Ferrer, Arnaud Franzi, Glenn Gowet, Willian Jannic, Fabien Kaddour, Kevin Katjawan, Yohann Lefebvre, Matthieu Martaud, Nicola Martoredjo, Alexandre Milesi, Jerome Milesi, Carl Nguela, Thomas Resutek, Nathanael Saihuliwa, Joey Santino, Thommy Sargito, Sandy Suwarno, Florian Tjohoredjo, Victor Tran, Julien Tranvanne, Elodie Blancher, Aurelie Escach, Elodie Fricheteau, Johanna Kou, Mathilde Mamelin, Laetitie Saberi, Cecile Sarengat, Alexia Tardieu
Men's Team	New Zealand; Alan Bosselman, Craig Cooper, Kevin Dennerly-Minturn, James Eunson, Ethan Haggo, Nathan Hannam, John Moody, Henry Tam, Ellis Thomas, Dylan Tibbo, Joe Wu	Australia; Ashley Brehaut, Stuart Gomez, David Jones, Ross Smith, Jeff Tho, Benjamin Walklate, Glenn Warfe	
Women's Team	New Zealand; Danielle Barry, Michelle Chan, Donna Cranston, Renee Flavell, Rachel Hindley, Jessica Jonggowisastro, Emma Rodgers	Australia; Erin Carroll, Leanne Choo, Leisha Cooper, Tania Luiz, Spoorti Rattan, Eugenia Tanaka	
