= Jacqueline Guan =

Australian badminton player (born 1994)

Personal information
- Born: 3 November 1994 (age 32) Melbourne, Australia

Sport
- Country: Australia
- Sport: Badminton
- Handedness: Left

Women's
- Highest ranking: 43 (WD) 6 March 2014; 83 (XD) 2 October 2014
- BWF profile
Medal record
Badminton
Representing Australia
Oceania Championships
Gold medal – first place	2014 Ballarat	Women's doubles
Silver medal – second place	2014 Ballarat	Mixed doubles
Oceania Mixed Team Championships
Gold medal – first place	2014 Ballarat	Mixed team
Gold medal – first place	2012 Ballarat	Mixed team
Oceania Women's Team Championships
Gold medal – first place	2012 Ballarat	Women's team

Jacqueline Guan (born 3 November 1994) is an Australian badminton player. In 2011, she won the girls' doubles title at the Australian Junior International tournament partnered with Gronya Somerville. At the same year, she and Somerville represented their country competed at the 2011 Commonwealth Youth Games. The duo lose the girls' doubles bronze medal match to Sri Lankan pair with the score 12–21, 21–19, and 16–21. She also competed at the 2011 and 2012 World Junior Championships. In 2014, she won the gold medal at the Oceania Championships in the women's doubles event and a silver medal in the mixed doubles event. In July 2014, she competed at the Glasgow Commonwealth Games.

== Achievements ==
=== Oceania Championships ===
Women's doubles
Year	Venue	Partner	Opponent	Score	Result
2014	Ken Kay Badminton Stadium; Ballarat, Australia	(Australia) Gronya Somerville	(Australia) Jacinta Joe (Australia) Louisa Ma	21–14, 21–17	Gold

Mixed doubles
Year	Venue	Partner	Opponent	Score	Result
2014	Ken Kay Badminton Stadium; Ballarat, Australia	(Australia) Matthew Chau	(New Zealand) Oliver Leydon-Davis (New Zealand) Susannah Leydon-Davis	19–21, 13–21	Silver
