= Erin Carroll =

Australian badminton player

Personal information
- Born: 4 April 1986 (age 40) Nhill, Victoria, Australia
- Height: 1.62 m (5 ft 4 in)
- Weight: 57 kg (126 lb)

Sport
- Country: Australia
- Sport: Badminton
- Handedness: Right
- Coached by: Lasse Bundgaard
- Highest ranking: 123 (August 2008)
- BWF profile
Medal record
Badminton
Representing Australia
Oceania Championships
Bronze medal – third place	2008 Nouméa	Women's doubles
Bronze medal – third place	2008 Nouméa	Mixed doubles
Oceania Mixed Team Championships
Silver medal – second place	2008 Nouméa	Mixed team
Oceania Women's Team Championships
Silver medal – second place	2008 Nouméa	Women's team

Erin Carroll (born 4 April 1986 in Nhill, Victoria) is an Australian badminton player from Ballarat, Victoria.

== Career ==
Caroll started playing badminton in 1998, and coaches by her father Rob. She attended Sebastopol Secondary College, where she was a keen participant in Badminton throughout her high school stay. She was part of the Australia national badminton team competed at the 2002 IBF World Junior Championships, 2004 Commonwealth Youth Games, 2006 Commonwealth Games, 2007 Sudirman Cup, and 2008 Summer Olympics. She is now a physical education teacher at Melbourne's Maribyrnong Sports Academy.

== Personal life ==
She married former Australian national badminton player, Benjamin Walklate, and in May 2014, she gave birth a son Charlie Walklate.

== Achievements ==
=== Oceania Championships ===
Women's doubles
Year	Venue	Partner	Opponent	Score	Result
2008	Nouméa, New Caledonia	(Australia) Leisha Cooper	(New Zealand) Renee Flavell (New Zealand) Donna Cranston	18–21, 11–21	Bronze

Mixed doubles
Year	Venue	Partner	Opponent	Score	Result
2008	Nouméa, New Caledonia	(Australia) Benjamin Walklate	(New Zealand) Henry Tam (New Zealand) Donna Cranston	21–13, 13–21, 15–21	Bronze

=== BWF International Challenge/Series ===
Women's doubles
Year	Tournament	Partner	Opponent	Score	Result
2009	Victorian International	(Australia) Renuga Veeran	(New Zealand) Danielle Barry (New Zealand) Donna Haliday	16–21, 21–19, 22–20	(gold) Winner
2008	Peru International	(Australia) Leisha Cooper	(Australia) Tania Luiz (Australia) Eugenia Tanaka	23–21, 17–21, 13–21	(silver) Runner-up
2006	Ballarat International	(Australia) Susan Dobson	(Australia) Angela Crowe (Australia) Jessica Lyons	21–16, 21–15	(gold) Winner

Mixed doubles
Year	Tournament	Partner	Opponent	Score	Result
2007	Fiji International	(Australia) Benjamin Walklate	(New Zealand) Craig Cooper (New Zealand) Renee Flavell	21–17, 14–21, 12–21	(silver) Runner-up
2007	Samoa International	(Australia) Benjamin Walklate	(New Zealand) Craig Cooper (New Zealand) Renee Flavell	4–21, 12–21	(silver) Runner-up

BWF International Challenge tournament
BWF International Series tournament
BWF Future Series tournament
