= Hong Kong national badminton team =

National badminton team representing Hong Kong

Hong Kong
- Association: Hong Kong Badminton Association (HKBA)
- Confederation: BA (Asia)
- President: Tong Yun Kai

BWF ranking
- Current ranking: 12 (6 October 2026)
- Highest ranking: 9 (7 July 2014)

Sudirman Cup
- Appearances: 16 (first in 1989)
- Best result: Group stage

Thomas Cup
- Appearances: 5 (first in 1996)
- Best result: Quarter-finals (2016)

Uber Cup
- Appearances: 8 (first in 1996)
- Best result: Semi-finals (2002)

Asian Mixed Team Championships
- Appearances: 3 (first in 2017)
- Best result: Semi-finals (2019)

Asian Men's Team Championships
- Appearances: 18 (first in 1962)
- Best result: Quarter-finals (1962, 1965, 1976, 1983, 2008, 2010, 2016, 2018)

Asian Women's Team Championships
- Appearances: 8 (first in 2004)
- Best result: Fourth place (2006, 2008)

The Hong Kong national badminton team (Chinese: 中國香港羽毛球代表隊; Jyutping: zung1 gwok3 hoeng1 gong2 jyu5 mou4 kau4 doi6 biu2 deoi6) is a badminton team that plays for Hong Kong SAR, China in international competitions. The Hong Kong national team won bronze at the 2019 Badminton Asia Mixed Team Championships, also known as the Tong Yun Kai Cup.

The women's team were semifinalists at the 2002 Uber Cup. The women's team also won bronze in the 2018 Asian Games women's team event.

== Competitive record ==
=== Thomas Cup ===
Year	Round	Pos
1949	Did not enter	
1952	Did not qualify	
1955	Did not qualify	
1958	Did not qualify	
1961	Did not qualify	
1964	Did not qualify	
1967	Did not qualify	
1970	Did not qualify	
1973	Did not qualify	
1976	Did not qualify	
1979	Did not qualify	
1982	Did not qualify	
1984	Did not qualify	
1986	Did not qualify	
1988	Did not qualify	
1990	Did not qualify	
1992	Did not qualify	
1994	Did not enter	
1996	Group stage	8th
1998	Group stage	8th
2000	Did not qualify	
2002	Did not qualify	
2004	Did not qualify	
2006	Did not qualify	
2008	Did not qualify	
2010	Did not qualify	
2012	Did not qualify	
2014	Group stage	12th
2016	Quarter-finals	8th
2018	Group stage	11th
2020	Did not enter	
2022	Did not qualify	
2024	Group stage	10th
2026	TBD	
2028	TBD	
2030	TBD	

=== Uber Cup ===
Year	Round	Pos
1957	Did not qualify	
1960	Did not qualify	
1963	Did not qualify	
1966	Did not qualify	
1969	Did not enter	
1972	Did not qualify	
1975	Did not enter	
1978	Did not enter	
1981	Did not enter	
1984	Did not qualify	
1986	Did not qualify	
1988	Did not qualify	
1990	Did not enter	
1992	Did not qualify	
1994	Did not qualify	
1996	Group stage	7th
1998	Group stage	8th
2000	Did not qualify	
2002	Semi-finals	4th
2004	Did not qualify	
2006	Quarter-finals	7th
2008	Quarter-finals	7th
2010	Did not qualify	
2012	Did not qualify	
2014	Group stage	10th
2016	Group stage	9th
2018	Group stage	12th
2020	Did not enter	
2022	Did not qualify	
2024	Group stage	10th
2026	TBD	
2028	TBD	
2030	TBD	

=== Sudirman Cup ===
Year	Round	Pos
1989	Group stage	14th
1991	Group stage	18th
1993	Group stage	17th
1995	Group stage	17th
1997	Group stage	17th
1999	Group stage	17th
2001	Group stage	15th
2003	Group stage	7th
2005	Group stage	6th
2007	Group stage	7th
2009	Group stage	8th
2011	Group stage	15th
2013	Group stage	9th
2015	Group stage	13th
2017	Group stage	10th
2019	Group stage	11th
2021	Did not enter	
2023	Did not qualify	
2025	Group stage	10th
2027	To be determined	
2029	To be determined	

=== Commonwealth Games ===
==== Mixed team ====
Year	Round	Pos
1978	Did not enter	
1982	Group stage	
1986	Group stage	
1990	Third place	3rd
1994	Semi-finals	4th

=== Asian Games ===
==== Men's team ====
Year	Round	Pos
1962	Did not enter	
1966	Quarter-finals	
1970	Quarter-finals	
1974	Quarter-finals	6th
1978	Did not enter	
1982	Quarter-finals	
1986	Quarter-finals	
1990	Quarter-finals	
1994	Did not enter	
1998	Quarter-finals	
2002	Quarter-finals	
2006	Group stage	
2010	Quarter-finals	
2014	Quarter-finals	
2018	Quarter-finals	
2022	Quarter-finals	
2026	Round of 16	
2030	TBD	
2034	TBD	
2038	TBD	

==== Women's team ====
Year	Round	Pos
1962	Did not enter	
1966	Did not enter	
1970	Did not enter	
1974	Did not enter	
1978	Did not enter	
1982	Did not enter	
1986	Did not enter	
1990	Did not enter	
1994	Quarter-finals	
1998	Quarter-finals	
2002	Semi-finals	4th
2006	Group stage	
2010	Round of 16	
2014	Round of 16	
2018	Round of 16	
2022	Round of 16	
2026	Round of 16	
2030	TBD	
2034	TBD	
2038	TBD	

=== Asian Team Championships ===
==== Men's team ====
Year	Round	Pos
1962	Quarter-finals	
1965	Quarter-finals	
1969	Round of 16	
1971	Round of 16	
1976	Quarter-finals	
1983	Quarter-finals	
1985	Round of 16	
1987	Group stage	
1989	Group stage	
1993	Group stage	
2004	Group stage	6th
2006	Group stage	
2008	Quarter-finals	
2010	Quarter-finals	
2012	Group stage	
2016	Quarter-finals	
2018	Quarter-finals	
2020	Did not enter	
2022	Group stage	
2024	Group Stage	12th
2026	Group stage	9th
2028	TBD	
2030	TBD	

==== Women's team ====
Year	Round	Pos
2004	Group stage	
2006	Fourth place	4th
2008	Fourth place	4th
2010	Group stage	
2012	Quarter-finals	7th
2016	Group stage	
2018	Group stage	
2020	Did not enter	
2022	Group stage	
2024	Quarter-finals	7th
2026	Group stage	9th
2028	TBD	
2030	TBD	

==== Mixed team ====
Year	Round	Pos
2017	Group stage	
2019	Semi-finals	4th
2023	Quarter-finals	8th
2025	Qualified	

=== Asia Cup ===
==== Men's team ====
Year	Round	Pos
1997	Group stage	
1999	Did not enter	
2001	Group stage	

=== East Asian Games ===
==== Men's team ====
Year	Round	Pos
1993	Semi-finals	4th
1997	Quarter-finals	5th
2009	Fifth place	5th
2013	Runners-up	2nd

==== Women's team ====
Year	Round	Pos
1993	Semi-finals	4th
1997	Quarter-finals	5th
2009	Semi-finals	3rd
2013	Semi-finals	4th

=== FISU World University Games ===
==== Mixed team ====
Year	Round	Pos
2007	Group stage	
2011	Group stage	
2013	Did not enter	
2015	Group stage	
2017	Quarter-finals	
2021	Quarter-finals	
2025	TBD	

=== World University Team Championships ===
==== Mixed team ====
Year	Round	Pos
2008	Did not enter	
2010	Did not enter	
2012	Group stage	
2014	Did not enter	
2016	Did not enter	
2018	Did not enter	

**Red border color indicates tournament was held on home soil.

== Junior competitive record ==
=== Suhandinata Cup ===
Year	Round	Pos
2000	Group stage	17th
2002	Group stage	17th
2004	Group stage	9th
2006	Group stage	17th
2007	Group stage	14th
2008	Group stage	8th
2009	Group stage	8th
2010	Group stage	11th
2011	Group stage	15th
2012	Quarter-finals	8th
2013	Group stage	9th
2014	Quarter-finals	8th
2015	Group stage	8th
2016	Group stage	17th
2017	Group stage	25th
2018	Group stage	11th
2019	Quarter-finals	5th
2020	Cancelled because of COVID-19 pandemic	
2021	Cancelled because of COVID-19 pandemic	
2022	Group stage	14th
2023	Group stage	11th
2024	Group stage	18th
2025	Group stage	17th of 36
2026	Quarter-finals	5th of 47

=== Asian Junior Team Championships ===
==== Boys' team ====
Year	Round	Pos
1997	Did not enter	
1998	Round of 16	
1999	Quarter-finals	
2000	Did not enter	
2001	Quarter-finals	
2002	Round of 16	
2004	Quarter-finals	
2005	Quarter-finals	

==== Girls' team ====
Year	Round	Pos
1997	Quarter-finals	
1998	Round of 16	
1999	Round of 16	
2000	Did not enter	
2001	Round of 16	
2002	Round of 16	
2004	Quarter-finals	
2005	Quarter-finals	

==== Mixed team ====
Year	Round	Pos
2006	Quarter-finals	
2007	Quarter-finals	
2008	Semi-finals	4th
2009	Quarter-finals	
2010	Group stage	
2011	Quarter-finals	
2012	Quarter-finals	
2013	Quarter-finals	
2014	Quarter-finals	
2015	Quarter-finals	
2016	Quarter-finals	
2017	Group stage	
2018	Group stage	
2019	Quarter-finals	
2023	Group stage	
2024	Group stage	13th
2025	Quarter-finals	8th
2026	Runners-up	2nd

**Red border color indicates tournament was held on home soil.

== Players ==
=== Current squad ===
As of 7 October 2025

==== Men's team ====
Name	DoB/Age	Highest Ranking of event		
Name	DoB/Age	MS	MD	XD
Lee Cheuk Yiu	28 August 1996 (age 30)	13	-	-
Ng Ka Long	24 June 1994 (age 32)	6	-	-
Chan Yin Chak	7 January 1999 (age 27)	67	-	-
Jason Gunawan	18 June 2004 (age 22)	34	-	-
Law Cheuk Him	26 June 1994 (age 32)	-	26	68
Yeung Shing Choi	21 March 1996 (age 30)	-	78	104
Lui Chun Wai	26 March 2002 (age 24)	-	71	47
Hung Kuei Chun	18 August 2004 (age 22)	-	71	98
Tang Chun Man	20 March 1995 (age 31)	-	24	2
Lee Chun Hei	25 January 1994 (age 32)	-	26	6

==== Women's team ====
Name	DoB/Age	Highest Ranking of event		
Name	DoB/Age	WS	WD	XD
Lo Sin Yan Happy	25 February 2003 (age 23)	41	-	-
Yeung Sum Yee	18 August 1999 (age 27)	105	-	-
Saloni Samirbhai Mehta	27 August 2002 (age 24)	72	-	-
Liang Ka Wing	19 June 2005 (age 21)	159	-	-
Yeung Nga Ting	13 October 1998 (age 28)	-	12	-
Yeung Pui Lam	26 October 2001 (age 25)	-	12	-
Lui Lok Lok	22 September 2002 (age 24)	-	24	142
Tsang Hiu Yan	22 February 2002 (age 24)	-	24	98
Fan Ka Yan	27 January 1997 (age 29)	-	43	104
Yau Mau Ying	24 October 1999 (age 27)	-	43	427
Tse Ying Suet	9 November 1991 (age 35)	-	9	2
Ng Tsz Yau	24 April 1998 (age 28)	-	28	21

=== Previous squads ===
==== Thomas Cup ====
- 2014, 2016, 2018

==== Uber Cup ====
- 2008, 2014, 2016, 2018

==== Sudirman Cup ====
- 2017, 2019

==== Asian Team Championships ====
- Men's team: 2018
- Women's team: 2018
- Mixed team: 2023
