= 2008 Pan American Thomas & Uber Cup Preliminaries =

Tournament details
- Dates: 16–18 February
- Venue: Sociedade Hípica de Campinas
- Location: Campinas, Brazil

The 2008 Pan American Thomas & Uber Cup Preliminaries was a continental badminton tournament held to determine the teams qualified for the 2008 Thomas & Uber Cup in Pan America. The event was held in Campinas, Brazil from 16 to 18 February 2008.

== Tournament ==
The 2008 Pan American Thomas & Uber Cup Preliminaries, is a continental team tournament staged to determine the teams in Pan America that are qualified for the 2008 Thomas & Uber Cup. This event was organized by Badminton Pan Am and the Brazilian Badminton Confederation.

== Men's team ==
=== Group stage ===
==== Round-robin ====
Pos	Team	Pld	W	L	MF	MA	MD	GF	GA	GD	PF	PA	PD	Pts	Qualification
1	Canada	3	3	0	14	1	+13	28	2	+26	625	384	+241	3	Final
2	United States	3	2	1	8	7	+1	17	17	0	579	615	−36	2	Final
3	Brazil (H)	3	1	2	4	11	−7	10	24	−14	553	641	−88	1	Third place playoff
4	Peru	3	0	3	4	11	−7	12	24	−12	582	699	−117	0	Third place playoff

Source: BWF
(H) Host
- Canada vs Brazil

Canada
5
Sociedade Hípica de Campinas, Court 1
16 February 2008, 09:30 UTC−3

Brazil
0

			1	2	3
1	(Canada) (Brazil)	Andrew Dabeka; Guilherme Pardo	21; 11	21; 14
2	(Canada) (Brazil)	Stephan Wojcikiewicz; Hugo Arthuso	21; 18	21; 18
3	(Canada) (Brazil)	Mike Beres; Aleksander Silva	21; 18	21; 9
4	(Canada) (Brazil)	Bobby Milroy / Toby Ng; Thomas Moretti / Daniel Paiola	21; 11	21; 12
5	(Canada) (Brazil)	Mike Beres / William Milroy; Lucas Araújo / Paulo von Scala	21; 14	21; 15

- United States vs Peru

United States
3
Sociedade Hípica de Campinas, Court 4
16 February 2008, 09:30 UTC−3

Peru
2

			1	2	3
1	(United States) (Peru)	Raju Rai; Andrés Corpancho	12; 21	17; 21
2	(United States) (Peru)	Michael Ractliffe; Rodrigo Pacheco	15; 21	21; 17	19; 21
3	(United States) (Peru)	Arnold Setiadi; Bruno Monteverde	21; 18	20; 22	21; 16
4	(United States) (Peru)	Howard Bach / Michael Ractliffe; Mario Cuba / Francisco Ugaz	21; 12	21; 11
5	(United States) (Peru)	Daniel Gouw / Chris Hales; Andrés Corpancho / Rodrigo Pacheco	21; 18	18; 21	21; 19

- Canada vs Peru

Canada
5
Sociedade Hípica de Campinas, Court 1
16 February 2008, 17:00 UTC−3

Peru
0

			1	2	3
1	(Canada) (Peru)	Andrew Dabeka; Andrés Corpancho	23; 21	21; 15
2	(Canada) (Peru)	Bobby Milroy; Rodrigo Pacheco	21; 13	21; 12
3	(Canada) (Peru)	Stephan Wojcikiewicz; Mario Cuba	21; 4	21; 9
4	(Canada) (Peru)	Bobby Milroy / Toby Ng; Andrés Corpancho / Francisco Ugaz	21; 18	21; 17
5	(Canada) (Peru)	Mike Beres / William Milroy; Mario Cuba / Bruno Monteverde	21; 4	21; 8

- United States vs Brazil

United States
4
Sociedade Hípica de Campinas, Court 4
16 February 2008, 17:00 UTC−3

Brazil
1

			1	2	3
1	(United States) (Brazil)	Raju Rai; Guilherme Pardo	21; 11	21; 18
2	(United States) (Brazil)	Ted Shear; Paulo von Scala	13; 21	14; 21
3	(United States) (Brazil)	Arnold Setiadi; Hugo Arthuso	21; 19	13; 21	21; 15
4	(United States) (Brazil)	Howard Bach / Michael Ractliffe; Lucas Araújo / Paulo von Scala	21; 9	21; 9
5	(United States) (Brazil)	Raju Rai / Chris Hales; Hugo Arthuso / Guilherme Pardo	21; 12	21; 18

- United States vs Canada

United States
1
Sociedade Hípica de Campinas, Court 1
17 February 2008, 11:00 UTC−3

Canada
4

			1	2	3
1	(United States) (Canada)	Raju Rai; Andrew Dabeka	10; 21	12; 21
2	(United States) (Canada)	Howard Bach / Daniel Gouw; Mike Beres / William Milroy	9; 21	15; 21
3	(United States) (Canada)	Ted Shear; Bobby Milroy	5; 21	5; 21
4	(United States) (Canada)	Chris Hales / Raju Rai; Andrew Dabeka / Toby Ng	21; 16	21; 19
5	(United States) (Canada)	Arnold Setiadi; Stephan Wojcikiewicz	15; 21	10; 21

- Peru vs Brazil

Peru
2
Sociedade Hípica de Campinas, Court 4
17 February 2008, 11:00 UTC−3

Brazil
3

			1	2	3
1	(Peru) (Brazil)	Andrés Corpancho; Guilherme Pardo	16; 21	21; 19	21; 15
2	(Peru) (Brazil)	Rodrigo Pacheco; Paulo von Scala	21; 11	21; 10
3	(Peru) (Brazil)	Bruno Monteverde; Lucas Araújo	21; 13	11; 21	14; 21
4	(Peru) (Brazil)	Andrés Corpancho / Francisco Ugaz; Hugo Arthuso / Guilherme Pardo	20; 22	10; 21
5	(Peru) (Brazil)	Mario Cuba / Bruno Monteverde; Lucas Araújo / Paulo von Scala	10; 21	25; 23	13; 21

=== Classification round ===
==== Third place playoff ====
- Brazil vs Peru

Brazil
1
Sociedade Hípica de Campinas, Court 3
18 February 2008, 11:00 UTC−3

Peru
3

			1	2	3
1	(Brazil) (Peru)	Guilherme Pardo; Andrés Corpancho	9; 21	18; 21
2	(Brazil) (Peru)	Paulo von Scala; Rodrigo Pacheco	18; 21	17; 21
3	(Brazil) (Peru)	Hugo Arthuso; Bruno Monteverde	20; 22	21; 13	21; 18
4	(Brazil) (Peru)	Guilherme Kumasaka / Paulo von Scala; Andrés Corpancho / Rodrigo Pacheco	18; 21	21; 19	12; 21
5	(Brazil) (Peru)	Hugo Arthuso / Guilherme Pardo; Mario Cuba / Bruno Monteverde				not played

==== Final ====
- Canada vs United States

Canada
3
Sociedade Hípica de Campinas, Court 2
18 February 2008, 11:00 UTC−3

United States
0

			1	2	3
1	(Canada) (United States)	Andrew Dabeka; Raju Rai	21; 15	15; 21	21; 15
2	(Canada) (United States)	Bobby Milroy; Arnold Setiadi	21; 8	21; 8
3	(Canada) (United States)	Stephan Wojcikiewicz; Howard Bach	21; 14	21; 18
4	(Canada) (United States)	Mike Beres / William Milroy; Michael Ractliffe / Raju Rai				not played
5	(Canada) (United States)	Bobby Milroy / Toby Ng; Howard Bach / Chris Hales				not played

== Women's team ==
=== Group stage ===
==== Round-robin ====
Pos	Team	Pld	W	L	MF	MA	MD	GF	GA	GD	PF	PA	PD	Pts	Qualification
1	Canada	3	3	0	12	3	+9	27	8	+19	713	591	+122	3	Final
2	United States	3	2	1	11	4	+7	23	10	+13	660	521	+139	2	Final
3	Peru	3	1	2	7	8	−1	16	18	−2	604	599	+5	1	Third place playoff
4	Brazil (H)	3	0	3	0	15	−15	0	30	−30	364	630	−266	0	Third place playoff

Source: BWF
(H) Host
- Canada vs. Brazil

Canada
5
Sociedade Hípica de Campinas, Court 2
16 February 2008, 09:30 UTC−3

Brazil
0

			1	2	3
1	(Canada) (Brazil)	Florence Lavoie; Mariana Arimori	21; 8	21; 14
2	(Canada) (Brazil)	Michelle Li; Renata Faustino	21; 12	21; 11
3	(Canada) (Brazil)	Valérie St. Jacques; Yasmin Cury	21; 14	21; 9
4	(Canada) (Brazil)	Fiona McKee / Valerie Loker; Paula Pereira / Thayse Salles	21; 16	21; 16
5	(Canada) (Brazil)	Charmaine Reid / Valérie St. Jacques; Fabiana Silva / Paula Villela	21; 17	21; 17

- United States vs Peru

United States
4
Sociedade Hípica de Campinas, Court 3
16 February 2008, 09:30 UTC−3

Peru
1

			1	2	3
1	(United States) (Peru)	Eva Lee; Claudia Rivero	21; 16	22; 20
2	(United States) (Peru)	Kuei Ya Chen; Cristina Aicardi	16; 21	21; 14	11; 21
3	(United States) (Peru)	Jamie Subandhi; Claudia Zornoza	21; 15	21; 13
4	(United States) (Peru)	Eva Lee / Mesinee Mangkalakiri; Cristina Aicardi / Claudia Zornoza	21; 13	21; 7
5	(United States) (Peru)	Kuei Ya Chen / Jamie Subandhi; Jie Meng / Katherine Winder	21; 19	21; 11

- Canada vs Peru

Canada
4
Sociedade Hípica de Campinas, Court 2
16 February 2008, 17:00 UTC−3

Peru
1

			1	2	3
1	(Canada) (Peru)	Charmaine Reid; Claudia Rivero	21; 19	18; 21	21; 19
2	(Canada) (Peru)	Michelle Li; Jie Meng	21; 13	21; 17
3	(Canada) (Peru)	Valerie St. Jacques; Cristina Aicardi	21; 11	16; 21	18; 21
4	(Canada) (Peru)	Florence Lavoie / Valerie Loker; Katherine Winder / Claudia Zornoza	21; 15	21; 18
5	(Canada) (Peru)	Fiona McKee / Charmaine Reid; Cristina Aicardi / Claudia Rivero	21; 16	15; 21	21; 12

- United States vs Brazil

United States
5
Sociedade Hípica de Campinas, Court 3
16 February 2008, 17:00 UTC−3

Brazil
0

			1	2	3
1	(United States) (Brazil)	Eva Lee; Mariana Arimori	21; 7	21; 14
2	(United States) (Brazil)	Lauren Todt; Renata Faustino	21; 12	21; 7
3	(United States) (Brazil)	Jamie Subandhi; Yasmin Cury	21; 7	21; 9
4	(United States) (Brazil)	Eva Lee / Mesinee Mangkalakiri; Paula Pereira / Thayse Salles	21; 11	21; 8
5	(United States) (Brazil)	Kuei Ya Chen / Jamie Subandhi; Paula Villela / Fabiana Silva	21; 11	21; 18

- United States vs Canada

United States
2
Sociedade Hípica de Campinas, Court 2
17 February 2008, 11:00 UTC−3

Canada
3

			1	2	3
1	(United States) (Canada)	Lauren Todt; Florence Lavoie	16; 21	17; 21
2	(United States) (Canada)	Eva Lee / Mesinee Mangkalakiri; Valerie Loker / Charmaine Reid	20; 22	19; 21
3	(United States) (Canada)	Kuei Ya Chen; Michelle Li	24; 26	18; 21
4	(United States) (Canada)	Panita Phongasavithas / Vimla Phongasavithas; Florence Lavoie / Fiona McKee	21; 18	20; 22	21; 16
5	(United States) (Canada)	Rena Wang; Valerie St. Jacques	15; 21	21; 19	21; 19

- Peru vs Brazil

Peru
5
Sociedade Hípica de Campinas, Court 3
17 February 2008, 11:00 UTC−3

Brazil
0

			1	2	3
1	(Peru) (Brazil)	Claudia Rivero; Mariana Arimori	21; 9	21; 16
2	(Peru) (Brazil)	Cristina Aicardi; Renata Faustino	21; 12	21; 11
3	(Peru) (Brazil)	Jie Meng / Claudia Zornoza; Thayse Salles / Fabiana Silva	21; 11	21; 8
4	(Peru) (Brazil)	Katherine Winder; Yasmin Cury	21; 13	21; 16
5	(Peru) (Brazil)	Cristina Aicardi / Claudia Rivero; Paula Pereira / Paula Villela	21; 15	21; 15

=== Classification round ===
==== Third place playoff ====
- Peru vs Brazil

Peru
3
Sociedade Hípica de Campinas, Court 4
18 February 2008, 11:00 UTC−3

Brazil
1

			1	2	3
1	(Peru) (Brazil)	Claudia Rivero; Mariana Arimori	21; 11	21; 7
2	(Peru) (Brazil)	Cristina Aicardi; Fabiana Silva	21; 13	21; 14
3	(Peru) (Brazil)	Claudia Zornoza; Renata Faustino	16; 21	21; 17	16; 21
4	(Peru) (Brazil)	Claudia Rivero / Katherine Winder; Paula Pereira / Thayse Salles	21; 13	21; 17
5	(Peru) (Brazil)	Jie Meng / Cristina Aicardi; Renata Faustino / Fabiana Silva				not played

==== Final ====
- Canada vs United States

Canada
1
Sociedade Hípica de Campinas, Court 1
18 February 2008, 11:00 UTC−3

United States
3

			1	2	3
1	(Canada) (United States)	Charmaine Reid; Eva Lee	15; 21	10; 21
2	(Canada) (United States)	Florence Lavoie; Lauren Todt	20; 22	21; 10	21; 18
3	(Canada) (United States)	Michelle Li; Jamie Subandhi	21; 23	13; 21
4	(Canada) (United States)	Valerie Loker / Charmaine Reid; Eva Lee / Mesinee Mangkalakiri	8; 21	15; 21
5	(Canada) (United States)	Fiona McKee / Valerie St. Jacques; Kuei Ya Chen / Jamie Subandhi				not played
