= 2008 Badminton Asia Thomas & Uber Cup Preliminaries =

Badminton championships

Tournament details
- Dates: 19–24 February
- Venue: Military Zone 7 Gymnasium
- Location: Ho Chi Minh City, Vietnam

The 2008 Badminton Asia Thomas & Uber Cup Preliminaries (officially known as the ROBOT Badminton Asia Thomas & Uber Cup Preliminaries 2008 for sponsorship reasons) were the Asian qualifiers for the 2008 Thomas & Uber Cup. The tournament was held on 19–24 February.

== Tournament ==
The 2008 Badminton Asia Thomas & Uber Cup Preliminaries serve as the Asian qualification event towards the 2008 Thomas & Uber Cup in Jakarta, Indonesia.

=== Venue ===
The tournament was held at the Military Zone 7 Stadium in Ho Chi Minh City, Vietnam.

=== Draw ===
- Men's team

Group A	Group B	Group C	Group D
Cambodia; Malaysia; Philippines; Chinese Taipei	South Korea; Singapore; Vietnam	India; Japan; Pakistan	Hong Kong; Macau; Sri Lanka; Thailand

- Women's team

Group W	Group X	Group Y	Group Z
Japan; Sri Lanka; Thailand	South Korea; Singapore; Cambodia	Hong Kong; Chinese Taipei; Vietnam	India; Malaysia

== Men's team ==
All times are Vietnam Standard Time (UTC+07:00).

=== Group stage ===
==== Group A ====
Pos	Team	Pld	W	L	MF	MA	MD	GF	GA	GD	PF	PA	PD	Pts	Qualification
1	Malaysia	3	3	0	15	0	+15	30	2	+28	660	307	+353	3	Knockout stage
2	Chinese Taipei	3	2	1	10	5	+5	22	11	+11	599	456	+143	2	Knockout stage
3	Philippines	3	1	2	5	10	−5	11	21	−10	449	562	−113	1	
4	Cambodia	3	0	3	0	15	−15	1	30	−29	264	647	−383	0	

Source: TS

Malaysia
5
Military Zone 7 Gymnasium, Court 2
20 February 2008, 09:00

Philippines
0

			1	2	3
1	(Malaysia) (Philippines)	Lee Chong Wei; Ian Mendez	21; 6	21; 8
2	(Malaysia) (Philippines)	Wong Choong Hann; Christopher Flores	21; 11	21; 9
3	(Malaysia) (Philippines)	Muhammad Hafiz Hashim; Lloyd Escoses	21; 7	21; 10
4	(Malaysia) (Philippines)	Choong Tan Fook / Lee Wan Wah; Christopher Flores / Reczon Salvaleon	21; 8	21; 13
5	(Malaysia) (Philippines)	Koo Kien Keat / Tan Boon Heong; Lloyd Escoses / Ian Mendez	21; 8	21; 7

Chinese Taipei
5
Military Zone 7 Gymnasium, Court 2
20 February 2008, 09:00

Cambodia
0

			1	2	3
1	(Chinese Taipei) (Cambodia)	Hsieh Yu-hsing; Sophorn Nuon	21; 7	21; 8
2	(Chinese Taipei) (Cambodia)	Liao Sheng-shiun; Veasna Troeung	21; 11	21; 10
3	(Chinese Taipei) (Cambodia)	Hsueh Hsuan-yi; Teav Yongvannak	21; 6	21; 9
4	(Chinese Taipei) (Cambodia)	Tsai Chia-hsin / Hu Chung-hsien; Sophorn Nuon / Chanbol Chea Bun	21; 10	21; 9
5	(Chinese Taipei) (Cambodia)	Lee Sheng-mu / Fang Chieh-min; Veasna Troeung / Teav Yongvannak	21; 5	21; 6

Chinese Taipei
5
Military Zone 7 Gymnasium, Court 1
20 February 2008, 18:30

Philippines
0

			1	2	3
1	(Chinese Taipei) (Philippines)	Hsieh Yu-hsing; Ian Mendez	21; 6	21; 7
2	(Chinese Taipei) (Philippines)	Liao Sheng-shiun; Christopher Flores	21; 17	15; 21	21; 19
3	(Chinese Taipei) (Philippines)	Hsueh Hsuan-yi; Lloyd Escoses	21; 6	21; 13
4	(Chinese Taipei) (Philippines)	Lee Sheng-mu / Fang Chieh-min; Christopher Flores / Reczon Salvaleon	21; 10	21; 10
5	(Chinese Taipei) (Philippines)	Tsai Chia-hsin / Hu Chung-hsien; Lloyd Escoses / Ian Mendez	21; 10	21; 16

Malaysia
5
Military Zone 7 Gymnasium, Court 3
20 February 2008, 18:30

Cambodia
0

			1	2	3
1	(Malaysia) (Cambodia)	Wong Choong Hann; Sophorn Nuon	21; 8	21; 9
2	(Malaysia) (Cambodia)	Muhammad Hafiz Hashim; Veasna Troeung	21; 4	21; 5
3	(Malaysia) (Cambodia)	Mohamad Arif Abdul Latif; Teav Yongvannak	21; 8	21; 7
4	(Malaysia) (Cambodia)	Koo Kien Keat / Tan Boon Heong; Sophorn Nuon / Chanbol Chea Bun	21; 1	21; 6
5	(Malaysia) (Cambodia)	Mohd Fairuzizuan Mohd Tazari / Mohd Zakry Abdul Latif; Veasna Troeung / Teav Yongvannak	21; 5	21; 3

Philippines
5
Military Zone 7 Gymnasium, Court 1
21 February 2008, 14:00

Cambodia
0

			1	2	3
1	(Philippines) (Cambodia)	Ian Mendez; Sophorn Nuon	21; 11	17; 21	21; 15
2	(Philippines) (Cambodia)	Christopher Flores; Veasna Troeung	21; 15	21; 8
3	(Philippines) (Cambodia)	Lloyd Escoses; Teav Yongvannak	21; 5	21; 7
4	(Philippines) (Cambodia)	Lloyd Escoses / Ian Mendez; Sophorn Nuon / Chanbol Chea Bun	21; 6	21; 8
5	(Philippines) (Cambodia)	Christopher Flores / Reczon Salvaleon; Veasna Troeung / Teav Yongvannak	21; 14	21; 17

Malaysia
5
Military Zone 7 Gymnasium, Court 2
21 February 2008, 14:00

Chinese Taipei
0

			1	2	3
1	(Malaysia) (Chinese Taipei)	Lee Chong Wei; Hsieh Yu-hsing	21; 8	21; 8
2	(Malaysia) (Chinese Taipei)	Koo Kien Keat / Tan Boon Heong; Tsai Chia-hsin / Hu Chung-hsien	21; 12	21; 13
3	(Malaysia) (Chinese Taipei)	Wong Choong Hann; Liao Sheng-shiun	21; 16	15; 21	21; 10
4	(Malaysia) (Chinese Taipei)	Choong Tan Fook / Lee Wan Wah; Lee Sheng-mu / Fang Chieh-min	21; 16	21; 18
5	(Malaysia) (Chinese Taipei)	Muhammad Hafiz Hashim; Hsueh Hsuan-yi	21; 10	15; 21	21; 11

==== Group B ====
Pos	Team	Pld	W	L	MF	MA	MD	GF	GA	GD	PF	PA	PD	Pts	Qualification
1	South Korea	2	2	0	9	1	+8	18	3	+15	437	267	+170	2	Knockout stage
2	Singapore	2	1	1	4	6	−2	10	12	−2	376	432	−56	1	Knockout stage
3	Vietnam (H)	2	0	2	2	8	−6	4	17	−13	319	433	−114	0	

Source: TS
(H) Host

Singapore
4
Military Zone 7 Gymnasium, Court 1
19 February 2008, 19:00

Vietnam
1

			1	2	3
1	(Singapore) (Vietnam)	Kendrick Lee; Nguyễn Tiến Minh	22; 20	21; 19
2	(Singapore) (Vietnam)	Ashton Chen; Dương Phương Nam	21; 13	21; 14
3	(Singapore) (Vietnam)	Derek Wong; Nguyễn Quang Minh	23; 21	21; 18
4	(Singapore) (Vietnam)	Kendrick Lee / Hendra Wijaya; Nguyễn Hoàng Hải / Nguyễn Huy Giang	21; 15	24; 22
5	(Singapore) (Vietnam)	Khoo Kian Teck / Terry Yeo; Nguyễn Tiến Minh / Trần Thanh Hải	16; 21	21; 19	14; 21

South Korea
5
Military Zone 7 Gymnasium, Court 2
20 February 2008, 14:00

Singapore
0

			1	2	3
1	(South Korea) (Singapore)	Park Sung-hwan; Ashton Chen	21; 10	19; 21	21; 11
2	(South Korea) (Singapore)	Jung Jae-sung / Lee Yong-dae; Kendrick Lee / Hendra Wijaya	21; 16	21; 17
3	(South Korea) (Singapore)	Lee Hyun-il; Aaron Tan	21; 9	21; 11
4	(South Korea) (Singapore)	Hwang Ji-man / Lee Jae-jin; Khoo Kian Teck / Terry Yeo	21; 12	21; 9
5	(South Korea) (Singapore)	Shon Seung-mo; Derek Wong	21; 17	21; 18

South Korea
4
Military Zone 7 Gymnasium, Court 2
21 February 2008, 18:30

Vietnam
1

			1	2	3
1	(South Korea) (Vietnam)	Park Sung-hwan; Nguyễn Tiến Minh	20; 22	20; 22
2	(South Korea) (Vietnam)	Jung Jae-sung / Lee Yong-dae; Bùi Bằng Đức / Đào Mạnh Thắng	21; 4	21; 7
3	(South Korea) (Vietnam)	Shon Seung-mo; Nguyễn Hoàng Hải	21; 6	21; 16
4	(South Korea) (Vietnam)	Hwang Ji-man / Lee Jae-jin; Dương Bảo Đức / Phạm Cao Hiếu	21; 12	21; 10
5	(South Korea) (Vietnam)	Lee Cheol-ho; Nguyễn Huy Giang	21; 10	21; 7

==== Group C ====
Pos	Team	Pld	W	L	MF	MA	MD	GF	GA	GD	PF	PA	PD	Pts	Qualification
1	Japan	2	2	0	10	0	+10	20	2	+18	457	315	+142	2	Knockout stage
2	India	2	1	1	5	5	0	12	10	+2	403	376	+27	1	Knockout stage
3	Pakistan	2	0	2	0	10	−10	0	20	−20	251	420	−169	0	

Source: TS

Japan
5
Military Zone 7 Gymnasium, Court 3
19 February 2008, 14:00

Pakistan
0

			1	2	3
1	(Japan) (Pakistan)	Sho Sasaki; Wajid Ali Chaudhry	21; 17	21; 11
2	(Japan) (Pakistan)	Keita Masuda / Tadashi Ōtsuka; Muhammad Atique / Rizwan Azam	21; 16	21; 11
3	(Japan) (Pakistan)	Kenichi Tago; Omar Zeeshan	21; 12	21; 9
4	(Japan) (Pakistan)	Keishi Kawaguchi / Naoki Kawamae; Ahmad Muhammad Waqas / Sulehri Kashif Ali	21; 9	21; 13
5	(Japan) (Pakistan)	Hiroyuki Endo; Ahsan Qamar	21; 15	21; 9

India
5
Military Zone 7 Gymnasium, Court 4
20 February 2008, 18:30

Pakistan
0

			1	2	3
1	(India) (Pakistan)	Anup Sridhar; Wajid Ali Chaudhry	21; 16	21; 15
2	(India) (Pakistan)	Sanave Thomas / Rupesh Kumar K. T. Muhammad Atique / Rizwan Azam	21; 11	21; 9
3	(India) (Pakistan)	Arvind Bhat; Omar Zeeshan	21; 14	21; 11
4	(India) (Pakistan)	Valiyaveetil Diju / Akshay Dewalkar; Ahmad Muhammad Waqas / Sulehri Kashif Ali	21; 17	21; 14
5	(India) (Pakistan)	Chetan Anand; Ahsan Qamar	21; 10	21; 12

Japan
5
Military Zone 7 Gymnasium, Court 3
21 February 2008, 14:00

India
0

			1	2	3
1	(Japan) (India)	Shōji Satō; Anup Sridhar	21; 17	21; 15
2	(Japan) (India)	Keita Masuda / Tadashi Ōtsuka; Sanave Thomas / Rupesh Kumar K. T.	21; 9	19; 21	21; 14
3	(Japan) (India)	Sho Sasaki; Arvind Bhat	21; 18	18; 21	21; 15
4	(Japan) (India)	Shuichi Sakamoto / Shintaro Ikeda; Valiyaveetil Diju / Akshay Dewalkar	21; 13	21; 12
5	(Japan) (India)	Kenichi Tago; Chetan Anand	21; 19	21; 19

==== Group D ====
Pos	Team	Pld	W	L	MF	MA	MD	GF	GA	GD	PF	PA	PD	Pts	Qualification
1	Thailand	3	3	0	14	1	+13	29	4	+25	664	407	+257	3	Knockout stage
2	Hong Kong	3	2	1	11	4	+7	24	9	+15	662	464	+198	2	Knockout stage
3	Sri Lanka	3	1	2	5	10	−5	10	20	−10	433	563	−130	1	
4	Macau	3	0	3	0	15	−15	0	30	−30	313	638	−325	0	

Source: TS

Hong Kong
5
Military Zone 7 Gymnasium, Court 1
19 February 2008, 19:00

Sri Lanka
0

			1	2	3
1	(Hong Kong) (Sri Lanka)	Chan Yan Kit; Niluka Karunaratne	21; 18	21; 7
2	(Hong Kong) (Sri Lanka)	Ng Wei; Dinuka Karunaratne	21; 10	21; 15
3	(Hong Kong) (Sri Lanka)	Wong Wai Hong; Diluka Karunaratne	21; 9	21; 6
4	(Hong Kong) (Sri Lanka)	Hui Wai Ho / Putra Alroy Tanama; Fernando Eranga / Niluka Karunaratne	21; 15	21; 10
5	(Hong Kong) (Sri Lanka)	Albertus Susanto Njoto / Yohan Hadikusumo Wiratama; Diluka Karunaratne / Dinuka Karunaratne	21; 12	21; 10

Thailand
5
Military Zone 7 Gymnasium, Court 3
19 February 2008, 19:00

Macau
0

			1	2	3
1	(Thailand) (Macau)	Poompat Sapkulchananart; Lam Chi Man	21; 7	21; 6
2	(Thailand) (Macau)	Pakkawat Vilailak; Ho Si Un	21; 3	21; 8
3	(Thailand) (Macau)	Tanongsak Saensomboonsuk; Kou Ka Seng	21; 4	21; 5
4	(Thailand) (Macau)	Songphon Anugritayawon / Nitipong Saengsila; Chan Io Chong / Lei Kit	21; 2	21; 12
5	(Thailand) (Macau)	Tesana Panvisvas / Sudket Prapakamol; Lam Chi Man / Lei Tat	21; 6	21; 9

Hong Kong
5
Military Zone 7 Gymnasium, Court 3
20 February 2008, 14:00

Macau
0

			1	2	3
1	(Hong Kong) (Macau)	Chan Yan Kit; Lam Chi Man	21; 6	29; 27
2	(Hong Kong) (Macau)	Ng Wei; Chan Io Chong	21; 8	21; 9
3	(Hong Kong) (Macau)	Wong Wai Hong; Ho Si Un	21; 6	21; 12
4	(Hong Kong) (Macau)	Albertus Susanto Njoto / Yohan Hadikusumo Wiratama; Lam Chi Man / Lei Kit	21; 8	21; 9
5	(Hong Kong) (Macau)	Hui Wai Ho / Putra Alroy Tanama; Chan Io Chong / Lei Tat	21; 10	21; 16

Thailand
5
Military Zone 7 Gymnasium, Court 4
20 February 2008, 14:00

Sri Lanka
0

			1	2	3
1	(Thailand) (Sri Lanka)	Boonsak Ponsana; Niluka Karunaratne	21; 9	21; 11
2	(Thailand) (Sri Lanka)	Poompat Sapkulchananart; Dinuka Karunaratne	21; 14	21; 9
3	(Thailand) (Sri Lanka)	Tanongsak Saensomboonsuk; Fernando Eranga	21; 11	21; 12
4	(Thailand) (Sri Lanka)	Patapol Ngernsrisuk / Sudket Prapakamol; Diluka Karunaratne / Dinuka Karunaratne	21; 5	21; 13
5	(Thailand) (Sri Lanka)	Tesana Panvisvas / Songphon Anugritayawon; Fernando Eranga / Niluka Karunaratne	21; 14	21; 13

Sri Lanka
5
Military Zone 7 Gymnasium, Court 3
21 February 2008, 09:00

Macau
0

			1	2	3
1	(Sri Lanka) (Macau)	Niluka Karunaratne; Lam Chi Man	21; 13	21; 13
2	(Sri Lanka) (Macau)	Dinuka Karunaratne; Chan Io Chong	21; 10	21; 19
3	(Sri Lanka) (Macau)	Fernando Eranga; Ho Si Un	21; 16	21; 10
4	(Sri Lanka) (Macau)	Diluka Karunaratne / Dinuka Karunaratne; Chan Io Chong / Lam Chi Man	21; 14	21; 18
5	(Sri Lanka) (Macau)	Fernando Eranga / Niluka Karunaratne; Lei Kit / Lei Tat	21; 12	21; 18

Hong Kong
1
Military Zone 7 Gymnasium, Court 3
21 February 2008, 18:30

Thailand
4

			1	2	3
1	(Hong Kong) (Thailand)	Chan Yan Kit; Boonsak Ponsana	21; 8	21; 8
2	(Hong Kong) (Thailand)	Albertus Susanto Njoto / Yohan Hadikusumo Wiratama; Patapol Ngernsrisuk / Sudket Prapakamol	16; 21	15; 21
3	(Hong Kong) (Thailand)	Ng Wei; Poompat Sapkulchananart	19; 21	23; 21	18; 21
4	(Hong Kong) (Thailand)	Hui Wai Ho / Putra Alroy Tanama; Songphon Anugritayawon / Tesana Panvisvas	21; 16	21; 18
5	(Hong Kong) (Thailand)	Wong Wai Hong; Tanongsak Saensomboonsuk	17; 21	21; 15	21; 5

=== Knockout stage ===
Quarter-finals
A1	Malaysia	3
C2	India	0
D1	Thailand	3
B1	Singapore	0
A2	Chinese Taipei	2
C1	Japan	3
D2	Hong Kong	0
B1	South Korea	3

Semi-finals
A1	Malaysia	3
D1	Thailand	0
C1	Japan	0
B1	South Korea	3

Final
A1	Malaysia	3
B1	South Korea	2
Third place
D1	Thailand	1
C1	Japan	3

==== Quarter-finals ====
Hong Kong
0
Military Zone 7 Gymnasium, Court 2
22 February 2008, 14:00

South Korea
3

			1	2	3
1	(Hong Kong) (South Korea)	Chan Yan Kit; Park Sung-hwan	11; 21	12; 21
2	(Hong Kong) (South Korea)	Albertus Susanto Njoto / Yohan Hadikusumo Wiratama; Jung Jae-sung / Lee Yong-dae	16; 21	18; 21
3	(Hong Kong) (South Korea)	Ng Wei; Lee Hyun-il	15; 21	16; 21
4	(Hong Kong) (South Korea)	Hui Wai Ho / Putra Alroy Tanama; Lee Jae-jin / Hwang Ji-man				not played
5	(Hong Kong) (South Korea)	Wong Wai Hong; Shon Seung-mo				not played

Chinese Taipei
2
Military Zone 7 Gymnasium, Court 4
22 February 2008, 14:00

Japan
3

			1	2	3
1	(Chinese Taipei) (Japan)	Hsieh Yu-hsing; Shōji Satō	22; 20	15; 21	16; 21
2	(Chinese Taipei) (Japan)	Liao Sheng-shiun; Sho Sasaki	13; 21	21; 18	22; 20
3	(Chinese Taipei) (Japan)	Hsueh Hsuan-yi; Kenichi Tago	8; 21	17; 21
4	(Chinese Taipei) (Japan)	Hu Chung-hsien / Tsai Chia-hsin; Keita Masuda / Tadashi Ōtsuka	21; 15	21; 14
5	(Chinese Taipei) (Japan)	Lee Sheng-mu / Fang Chieh-min; Shuichi Sakamoto / Shintaro Ikeda	19; 21	23; 25

Thailand
3
Military Zone 7 Gymnasium, Court 2
22 February 2008, 18:30

Singapore
0

			1	2	3
1	(Thailand) (Singapore)	Boonsak Ponsana; Kendrick Lee Yen Hui	21; 16	21; 8
2	(Thailand) (Singapore)	Songphon Anugritayawon / Tesana Panvisvas; Khoo Kian Teck / Hendra Wijaya	21; 11	21; 11
3	(Thailand) (Singapore)	Poompat Sapkulchananart; Ashton Chen Yong Zhao	21; 13	19; 21	21; 18
4	(Thailand) (Singapore)	Patapol Ngernsrisuk / Sudket Prapakamol; Ashton Chen Yong Zhao / Hendri Kurniawan Saputra				not played
5	(Thailand) (Singapore)	Tanongsak Saensomboonsuk; Derek Wong				not played

Malaysia
3
Military Zone 7 Gymnasium, Court 4
22 February 2008, 18:30

India
0

			1	2	3
1	(Malaysia) (India)	Lee Chong Wei; Anup Sridhar	21; 15	21; 14
2	(Malaysia) (India)	Choong Tan Fook / Lee Wan Wah; Sanave Thomas / Rupesh Kumar K. T.	21; 9	21; 10
3	(Malaysia) (India)	Wong Choong Hann; Arvind Bhat	21; 16	18; 21	21; 10
4	(Malaysia) (India)	Mohd Fairuzizuan Mohd Tazari / Mohd Zakry Abdul Latif; Akshay Dewalkar / Valiyaveetil Diju				not played
5	(Malaysia) (India)	Muhammad Hafiz Hashim; Chetan Anand				not played

==== Semi-finals ====
Malaysia
3
Military Zone 7 Gymnasium, Court 2
23 February 2008, 13:00

Thailand
0

			1	2	3
1	(Malaysia) (Thailand)	Lee Chong Wei; Pakkawat Vilailak	21; 11	21; 15
2	(Malaysia) (Thailand)	Koo Kien Keat / Tan Boon Heong; Patapol Ngernsrisuk / Sudket Prapakamol	21; 15	21; 16
3	(Malaysia) (Thailand)	Wong Choong Hann; Tanongsak Saensomboonsuk	19; 21	21; 15	21; 19
4	(Malaysia) (Thailand)	Choong Tan Fook / Lee Wan Wah; Songphon Anugritayawon / Nitipong Saengsila				not played
5	(Malaysia) (Thailand)	Muhammad Hafiz Hashim; Tesana Panvisvas				not played

Japan
0
Military Zone 7 Gymnasium, Court 3
23 February 2008, 18:30

South Korea
3

			1	2	3
1	(Japan) (South Korea)	Sho Sasaki; Park Sung-hwan	14; 21	12; 21
2	(Japan) (South Korea)	Shuichi Sakamoto / Shintaro Ikeda; Jung Jae-sung / Lee Yong-dae	13; 16	18; 12
3	(Japan) (South Korea)	Kenichi Tago; Lee Hyun-il	16; 21	15; 21
4	(Japan) (South Korea)	Keishi Kawaguchi / Naoki Kawamae; Lee Jae-jin / Hwang Ji-man				not played
5	(Japan) (South Korea)	Hiroyuki Endo; Shon Seung-mo				not played

==== Third place ====
Thailand
1
Military Zone 7 Gymnasium, Court 2
24 February 2008, 09:00

Japan
3

			1	2	3
1	(Thailand) (Japan)	Pakkawat Vilailak; Shōji Satō	17; 21	14; 21
2	(Thailand) (Japan)	Shuichi Sakamoto / Shintaro Ikeda; Keita Masuda / Tadashi Ōtsuka	13; 21	2; 11		retired
3	(Thailand) (Japan)	Tanongsak Saensomboonsuk; Sho Sasaki	21; 13	21; 18
4	(Thailand) (Japan)	Songphon Anugritayawon / Patapol Ngernsrisuk; Shuichi Sakamoto / Shintaro Ikeda	18; 21	18; 21
5	(Thailand) (Japan)	Sudket Prapakamol; Hiroyuki Endo				not played

==== Final ====
Malaysia
3
Military Zone 7 Gymnasium, Court 3
24 February 2008, 18:30

South Korea
2

			1	2	3
1	(Malaysia) (South Korea)	Lee Chong Wei; Shon Seung-mo	21; 8	21; 11
2	(Malaysia) (South Korea)	Koo Kien Keat / Tan Boon Heong; Jung Jae-sung / Lee Jae-jin	16; 21	21; 17	19; 21
3	(Malaysia) (South Korea)	Wong Choong Hann; Lee Cheol-ho	21; 6	21; 17
4	(Malaysia) (South Korea)	Mohd Fairuzizuan Mohd Tazari / Mohd Zakry Abdul Latif; Hwang Ji-man / Park Sung-hwan	19; 21	18; 21
5	(Malaysia) (South Korea)	Muhammad Hafiz Hashim; Lee Yong-dae	21; 17	21; 10

=== Qualified teams ===
- Malaysia (25th appearance)
- South Korea (13th appearance)
- Japan (9th appearance)
- Thailand (10th appearance)

== Women's team ==
All times are Vietnam Standard Time (UTC+07:00).

=== Group stage ===
==== Group W ====
Pos	Team	Pld	W	L	MF	MA	MD	GF	GA	GD	PF	PA	PD	Pts	Qualification
1	Japan	2	2	0	9	1	+8	18	4	+14	437	288	+149	2	Knockout stage
2	Thailand	2	1	1	6	4	+2	14	8	+6	397	298	+99	1	Knockout stage
3	Sri Lanka	2	0	2	0	10	−10	0	20	−20	172	420	−248	0	

Source: TS

Japan
5
Military Zone 7 Gymnasium, Court 1
19 February 2008, 14:00

Sri Lanka
0

			1	2	3
1	(Japan) (Sri Lanka)	Kaori Mori; Thilini Jayasinghe	21; 11	21; 19
2	(Japan) (Sri Lanka)	Yu Hirayama; Achini Ratnasiri	21; 10	21; 9
3	(Japan) (Sri Lanka)	Kaori Imabeppu; Gayani Perera	21; 12	21; 8
4	(Japan) (Sri Lanka)	Miyuki Maeda / Satoko Suetsuna; Thilini Jayasinghe / Chandrika de Silva	21; 13	24; 6
5	(Japan) (Sri Lanka)	Aki Akao / Tomomi Matsuda; Achini Ratnasiri / Upuli Weerasinghe	21; 5	21; 8

Thailand
5
Military Zone 7 Gymnasium, Court 1
20 February 2008, 09:00

Sri Lanka
0

			1	2	3
1	(Thailand) (Sri Lanka)	Salakjit Ponsana; Chandrika de Silva	21; 5	21; 9
2	(Thailand) (Sri Lanka)	Porntip Buranaprasertsuk; Achini Ratnasiri	21; 9	21; 11
3	(Thailand) (Sri Lanka)	Sapsiree Taerattanachai; Gayani Perera	21; 5	21; 9
4	(Thailand) (Sri Lanka)	Duanganong Aroonkesorn / Kunchala Voravichitchaikul; Thilini Jayasinghe / Chandrika de Silva	21; 6	21; 5
5	(Thailand) (Sri Lanka)	Soratja Chansrisukot / Saralee Thungthongkam; Achini Ratnasiri / Upuli Weerasinghe	21; 6	21; 6

Japan
4
Military Zone 7 Gymnasium, Court 1
21 February 2008, 18:30

Thailand
1

			1	2	3
1	(Japan) (Thailand)	Eriko Hirose; Salakjit Ponsana	11; 21	21; 14	21; 12
2	(Japan) (Thailand)	Kumiko Ogura / Reiko Shiota; Duanganong Aroonkesorn / Sapsiree Taerattanachai	21; 6	21; 18
3	(Japan) (Thailand)	Kaori Mori; Soratja Chansrisukot	21; 10	21; 19
4	(Japan) (Thailand)	Miyuki Maeda / Satoko Suetsuna; Saralee Thungthongkam / Kunchala Voravichitchaikul	15; 21	21; 8	15; 21
5	(Japan) (Thailand)	Yu Hirayama; Porntip Buranaprasertsuk	21; 16	18; 21		retired

==== Group X ====
Pos	Team	Pld	W	L	MF	MA	MD	GF	GA	GD	PF	PA	PD	Pts	Qualification
1	South Korea	2	2	0	10	0	+10	20	1	+19	439	230	+209	2	Knockout stage
2	Singapore	2	1	1	5	5	0	11	10	+1	407	263	+144	1	Knockout stage
3	Cambodia	2	0	2	0	10	−10	0	20	−20	67	420	−353	0	

Source: TS

South Korea
5
Military Zone 7 Gymnasium, Court 4
19 February 2008, 14:00

Cambodia
0

			1	2	3
1	(South Korea) (Cambodia)	Hwang Hye-youn; Noeur Sodany	21; 4	21; 3
2	(South Korea) (Cambodia)	Lee Yun-hwa; Chhoun Chay Ry	21; 3	21; 3
3	(South Korea) (Cambodia)	Jang Soo-young; Keo Pich Chanravy	21; 1	21; 3
4	(South Korea) (Cambodia)	Ha Jung-eun / Kim Min-jung; Chann Dara / Chhuon Chay Ry	21; 1	21; 4
5	(South Korea) (Cambodia)	Lee Hyo-jung / Lee Kyung-won; Noeur Sodany / Keo Pich Chanravy	21; 6	21; 5

Singapore
5
Military Zone 7 Gymnasium, Court 1
20 February 2008, 14:00

Cambodia
0

			1	2	3
1	(Singapore) (Cambodia)	Xing Aiying; Noeur Sodany	21; 1	21; 3
2	(Singapore) (Cambodia)	Gu Juan; Chhoun Chay Ry	21; 2	21; 8
3	(Singapore) (Cambodia)	Zhang Beiwen; Keo Pich Chanravy	21; 1	21; 3
4	(Singapore) (Cambodia)	Shinta Mulia Sari / Yao Lei; Chann Dara / Chhuon Chay Ry	21; 6	21; 5
5	(Singapore) (Cambodia)	Jiang Yanmei / Li Yujia; Noeur Sodany / Keo Pich Chanravy	21; 3	21; 2

South Korea
5
Military Zone 7 Gymnasium, Court 2
21 February 2008, 09:00

Singapore
0

			1	2	3
1	(South Korea) (Singapore)	Jun Jae-youn; Xing Aiying	13; 21	21; 19	21; 12
2	(South Korea) (Singapore)	Lee Hyo-jung / Lee Kyung-won; Jiang Yanmei / Li Yujia	21; 16	21; 18
3	(South Korea) (Singapore)	Hwang Hye-youn; Gu Juan	21; 18	21; 13
4	(South Korea) (Singapore)	Ha Jung-eun / Kim Min-jung; Shinta Mulia Sari / Yao Lei	21; 17	22; 20
5	(South Korea) (Singapore)	Lee Yun-hwa; Zhang Beiwen	24; 22	23; 21

==== Group Y ====
Pos	Team	Pld	W	L	MF	MA	MD	GF	GA	GD	PF	PA	PD	Pts	Qualification
1	Hong Kong	2	2	0	7	3	+4	15	8	+7	436	352	+84	2	Knockout stage
2	Chinese Taipei	2	1	1	7	3	+4	15	6	+9	389	343	+46	1	Knockout stage
3	Vietnam (H)	2	0	2	1	9	−8	3	19	−16	310	440	−130	0	

Source: TS
(H) Host

Chinese Taipei
5
Military Zone 7 Gymnasium, Court 2
19 February 2008, 14:00

Vietnam
0

			1	2	3
1	(Chinese Taipei) (Vietnam)	Cheng Shao-chieh; Lê Ngọc Nguyên Nhung	21; 13	21; 15
2	(Chinese Taipei) (Vietnam)	Chien Yu-chin / Cheng Wen-hsing; Nguyễn Thị Sen / Vũ Thị Trang	21; 9	21; 12
3	(Chinese Taipei) (Vietnam)	Pai Min-jie; Phùng Nguyễn Phương Nhi	21; 16	21; 13
4	(Chinese Taipei) (Vietnam)	Chou Chia-chi / Yang Chia-tseng; Lê Thị Thanh Thuỷ / Trần Thị Thanh Thảo	21; 6	21; 5
5	(Chinese Taipei) (Vietnam)	Chiu Yi-ju; Thái Thị Hồng Gấm	21; 1	21; 3

Hong Kong
4
Military Zone 7 Gymnasium, Court 2
20 February 2008, 18:30

Vietnam
1

			1	2	3
1	(Hong Kong) (Vietnam)	Wang Chen; Lê Ngọc Nguyên Nhung	21; 12	21; 15
2	(Hong Kong) (Vietnam)	Chau Hoi Wah / Koon Wai Chee; Nguyễn Thị Sen / Vũ Thị Trang	21; 13	21; 8
3	(Hong Kong) (Vietnam)	Yip Pui Yin; Phùng Nguyễn Phương Nhi	21; 9	21; 4
4	(Hong Kong) (Vietnam)	Chan Tsz Ka / Tse Ying Suet; Lê Thị Thanh Thuỷ / Trần Thị Thanh Thảo	22; 20	13; 21	15; 21
5	(Hong Kong) (Vietnam)	Mong Kwan Yi; Thái Thị Hồng Gấm	21; 11	12; 21	21; 18

Chinese Taipei
2
Military Zone 7 Gymnasium, Court 4
21 February 2008, 18:30

Hong Kong
3

			1	2	3
1	(Chinese Taipei) (Hong Kong)	Cheng Shao-chieh; Wang Chen	9; 21	15; 21
2	(Chinese Taipei) (Hong Kong)	Pai Min-jie; Yip Pui Yin	16; 21	11; 21
3	(Chinese Taipei) (Hong Kong)	Chiu Yi-ju; Mong Kwan Yi	15; 21	21; 17	8; 21
4	(Chinese Taipei) (Hong Kong)	Chien Yu-chin / Cheng Wen-hsing; Chau Hoi Wah / Koon Wai Chee	21; 17	21; 17
5	(Chinese Taipei) (Hong Kong)	Chou Chia-chi / Yang Chia-tseng; Yip Pui Yin / Chan Tsz Ka	21; 14	21; 15

==== Group Z ====
Pos	Team	Pld	W	L	MF	MA	MD	GF	GA	GD	PF	PA	PD	Pts	Qualification
1	Malaysia	1	1	0	4	1	+3	8	4	+4	233	202	+31	1	Knockout stage
2	India	1	0	1	1	4	−3	4	8	−4	202	233	−31	0	Knockout stage

Source: TS

Malaysia
4
Military Zone 7 Gymnasium, Court 1
21 February 2008, 09:00

India
1

			1	2	3
1	(Malaysia) (India)	Wong Mew Choo; Saina Nehwal	15; 21	22; 20	21; 17
2	(Malaysia) (India)	Julia Wong Pei Xian; Trupti Murgunde	21; 10	21; 12
3	(Malaysia) (India)	Anita Raj Kaur; Aditi Mutatkar	9; 21	24; 26
4	(Malaysia) (India)	Chin Eei Hui / Wong Pei Tty; Jwala Gutta / Shruti Kurien	21; 16	21; 17
5	(Malaysia) (India)	Haw Chiou Hwee / Lim Pek Siah; Saina Nehwal / Aparna Balan	16; 21	21; 10	21; 11

=== Knockout stage ===
Quarter-finals
W1	Japan	3
Y2	Chinese Taipei	1
Z1	Malaysia	3
X2	Singapore	1
W2	Thailand	0
Y1	Hong Kong	3
Z2	India	1
X1	South Korea	3

Semi-finals
W1	Japan	3
Z1	Malaysia	2
Y1	Hong Kong	1
X1	South Korea	3

Final
W1	Japan	1
X1	South Korea	3
Third place
Z1	Malaysia	3
Y1	Hong Kong	0

==== Quarter-finals ====
India
1
Military Zone 7 Gymnasium, Court 1
22 February 2008, 14:00

South Korea
3

			1	2	3
1	(India) (South Korea)	Saina Nehwal; Jun Jae-youn	21; 17	21; 12
2	(India) (South Korea)	Aparna Balan / Shruti Kurien; Lee Hyo-jung / Lee Kyung-won	13; 21	9; 21
3	(India) (South Korea)	Aditi Mutatkar; Hwang Hye-youn	19; 21	5; 21
4	(India) (South Korea)	Jwala Gutta / Saina Nehwal; Ha Jung-eun / Kim Min-jung	10; 21	20; 22
5	(India) (South Korea)	Sayali Gokhale; Lee Yun-hwa				not played

Thailand
2
Military Zone 7 Gymnasium, Court 3
22 February 2008, 14:00

Hong Kong
3

			1	2	3
1	(Thailand) (Hong Kong)	Soratja Chansrisukot; Wang Chen	13; 21	17; 21
2	(Thailand) (Hong Kong)	Duanganong Aroonkesorn / Kunchala Voravichitchaikul; Koon Wai Chee / Wang Chen	21; 10	16; 21	10; 21
3	(Thailand) (Hong Kong)	Porntip Buranaprasertsuk; Yip Pui Yin	15; 21	19; 21
4	(Thailand) (Hong Kong)	Salakjit Ponsana / Saralee Thungthongkam; Shuichi Sakamoto / Shintaro Ikeda				not played
5	(Thailand) (Hong Kong)	Sapsiree Taerattanachai; Mong Kwan Yi				not played

Japan
3
Military Zone 7 Gymnasium, Court 1
22 February 2008, 18:30

Chinese Taipei
0

			1	2	3
1	(Japan) (Chinese Taipei)	Eriko Hirose; Pai Min-jie	21; 19	21; 10
2	(Japan) (Chinese Taipei)	Kumiko Ogura / Reiko Shiota; Cheng Wen-hsing / Chien Yu-chin	18; 21	17; 21
3	(Japan) (Chinese Taipei)	Kaori Mori; Chang Li-ying	21; 10	21; 14
4	(Japan) (Chinese Taipei)	Miyuki Maeda / Satoko Suetsuna; Chou Chia-chi / Yang Chia-tseng	21; 11	23; 21
5	(Japan) (Chinese Taipei)	Yu Hirayama; Chiu Yi-ju				not played

Malaysia
3
Military Zone 7 Gymnasium, Court 3
22 February 2008, 18:30

Singapore
0

			1	2	3
1	(Malaysia) (Singapore)	Wong Mew Choo; Xing Aiying	20; 22	19; 21
2	(Malaysia) (Singapore)	Chin Eei Hui / Wong Pei Tty; Jiang Yanmei / Li Yujia	21; 16	21; 17
3	(Malaysia) (Singapore)	Julia Wong Pei Xian; Fu Mingtian	21; 10	21; 12
4	(Malaysia) (Singapore)	Lim Pek Siah / Ng Hui Lin; Shinta Mulia Sari / Yao Lei	21; 17	21; 15
5	(Malaysia) (Singapore)	Lyddia Cheah; Gu Juan				not played

==== Semi-finals ====
Hong Kong
1
Military Zone 7 Gymnasium, Court 3
23 February 2008, 13:00

South Korea
4

			1	2	3
1	(Hong Kong) (South Korea)	Wang Chen; Jun Jae-youn	21; 13	23; 21
2	(Hong Kong) (South Korea)	Chau Hoi Wah / Koon Wai Chee; Lee Hyo-jung / Lee Kyung-won	9; 21	7; 21
3	(Hong Kong) (South Korea)	Yip Pui Yin; Hwang Hye-youn	15; 21	11; 21
4	(Hong Kong) (South Korea)	Chan Tsz Ka / Tse Ying Suet; Ha Jung-eun / Kim Min-jung	10; 21	10; 21
5	(Hong Kong) (South Korea)	Ng Ka Shun; Lee Yun-hwa				not played

Japan
3
Military Zone 7 Gymnasium, Court 3
23 February 2008, 18:30

Malaysia
2

			1	2	3
1	(Japan) (Malaysia)	Eriko Hirose; Wong Mew Choo	14; 21	23; 25
2	(Japan) (Malaysia)	Kaori Mori; Julia Wong Pei Xian	20; 22	21; 17	20; 22
3	(Japan) (Malaysia)	Yu Hirayama; Lyddia Cheah	21; 16	21; 13
4	(Japan) (Malaysia)	Kumiko Ogura / Reiko Shiota; Lim Pek Siah / Wong Pei Tty	22; 20	19; 21	21; 19
5	(Japan) (Malaysia)	Aki Akao / Tomomi Matsuda; Goh Liu Ying / Ng Hui Lin	21; 11	19; 21	21; 9

==== Third place ====
Malaysia
3
Military Zone 7 Gymnasium, Court 3
24 February 2008, 09:00

Hong Kong
0

			1	2	3
1	(Malaysia) (Hong Kong)	Julia Wong Pei Xian; Ng Ka Shun	21; 10	16; 21	21; 17
2	(Malaysia) (Hong Kong)	Chin Eei Hui / Wong Pei Tty; Chau Hoi Wah / Tse Ying Suet	13; 15	2; 9
3	(Malaysia) (Hong Kong)	Anita Raj Kaur; Mong Kwan Yi	21; 17	21; 12
4	(Malaysia) (Hong Kong)	Goh Liu Ying / Ng Hui Lin; Koon Wai Chee / Wang Chen				not played
5	(Malaysia) (Hong Kong)	Lyddia Cheah; Chan Tsz Ka				not played

==== Final ====
Japan
3
Military Zone 7 Gymnasium, Court 2
24 February 2008, 13:00

South Korea
2

			1	2	3
1	(Japan) (South Korea)	Eriko Hirose; Jun Jae-youn	22; 24	14; 21
2	(Japan) (South Korea)	Miyuki Maeda / Satoko Suetsuna; Kim Min-jung / Lee Hyo-jung	22; 20	21; 16
3	(Japan) (South Korea)	Yu Hirayama; Hwang Hye-youn	17; 21	13; 21
4	(Japan) (South Korea)	Aki Akao / Tomomi Matsuda; Ha Jung-eun / Lee Kyung-won	17; 21	5; 21
5	(Japan) (South Korea)	Kaori Imabeppu; Lee Yun-hwa				not played

=== Qualified teams ===
- South Korea (13th appearance)
- Japan (19th appearance)
- Malaysia (12th appearance)
- Hong Kong (5th appearance)
