= Jeff Tho =

Australian badminton player (born 1988)

Personal information
- Born: Jeffrey Tho; 14 April 1988 (age 38) Ipoh, Malaysia
- Height: 1.74 m (5 ft 9 in)

Sport
- Country: Australia
- Sport: Badminton

Men's
- Highest ranking: 161 (MS) 15 Jul 2010; 362 (MD) 15 Jul 2010; 836 (XD) 13 Sep 2012
- BWF profile
Medal record
Badminton
Representing Australia
Oceania Championships
Gold medal – first place	2014 Ballarat	Men's singles
Bronze medal – third place	2008 Nouméa	Men's singles

Jeffrey Tho (born 14 April 1988) is an Australian male badminton player. He competed at the 2010 and 2014 Commonwealth Games. In 2014, he won the gold medal at the Oceania Championships in the men's singles event, he also won bronze in 2008.

== Personal life ==
Prior to beginning his badminton career, Tho worked as a dentist in Ballarat, Victoria.

== Achievements ==
=== Oceania Championships ===
Men's Singles
Year	Venue	Opponent	Score	Result
2014	Ken Kay Badminton Hall; Ballarat, Australia	(Australia) Ashwant Gobinathan	21-13, 21-15	Gold
2008	Nouméa, New Caledonia	(New Zealand) John Moody	15-21, 8-21	Bronze

=== BWF International Challenge/Series ===
Men's singles
Year	Tournament	Opponent	Score	Result
2006	Fiji International	(Malaysia) Ismail Saman	19–21, 12–21	(silver) Runner-up

Men's doubles
Year	Tournament	Partner	Opponent	Score	Result
2017	Nouméa International	(Australia) Joel Findlay	(Australia) Matthew Chau (Australia) Sawan Serasinghe	21–17, 7–21, 14–21	(silver) Runner-up

BWF International Challenge tournament
BWF International Series tournament
BWF Future Series tournament

=== Victoria Achievements ===
- Awarded the 2003 Victorian School Blue Award for Badminton
- Runner-up in the U19 Men's Doubles event at the 2005 U19 Australasian Badminton Championships
- Runner-up in the U19 Men's Singles event at the 2005 U19 Australasian Badminton Championships
- Selected into the U17 Victorian Badminton team (2000–2004)
- Selected into the Under 19 Victorian Badminton team from 2002 to 2006
- Winner of the U19 Mixed Doubles title at the 2005 U19 Australasian Badminton Championships
