= Henry Tam =

New Zealand badminton player (born 1988)

Personal information
- Born: 24 June 1988 (age 38) Hong Kong

Sport
- Country: New Zealand
- Sport: Badminton

Men's & mixed doubles
- Highest ranking: 37 (MD 26 August 2010); 25 (XD 15 July 2010)
- BWF profile
Medal record
Men's badminton
Representing New Zealand
Oceania Championships
Gold medal – first place	2008 Nouméa	Mixed doubles
Silver medal – second place	2008 Nouméa	Men's doubles
Silver medal – second place	2010 Invercargill	Men's doubles
Silver medal – second place	2010 Invercargill	Mixed doubles
Bronze medal – third place	2006 Auckland	Mixed doubles
Oceania Mixed Team Championships
Gold medal – first place	2008 Nouméa	Mixed team
Gold medal – first place	2006 Auckland	Mixed team
Silver medal – second place	2010 Invercargill	Mixed team
Oceania Men's Team Championships
Gold medal – first place	2008 Nouméa	Men's team
Silver medal – second place	2010 Invercargill	Men's team

Henry Tam (born 24 June 1988) is a former New Zealand badminton player representing New Zealand from 2004 - 2010. He competed at the Bendigo 2004 Commonwealth Youth Games and Delhi 2010 Commonwealth Games. His most notable title was in 2008, where he won the mixed doubles title at the Oceania Championships in Nouméa, New Caledonia with Donna Haliday. In addition to his 5 international titles in the mixed doubles, his other notable achievements was a run of five consecutive New Zealand National men's doubles titles during 2010–2014.

== Achievements ==
=== Oceania Championships ===
Men's doubles
Year	Venue	Partner	Opponent	Score	Result
2008	Salle Veyret, Nouméa, New Caledonia	(New Zealand) Nathan Hannam	(Australia) Ross Smith (Australia) Glenn Warfe	13–21, 18–21	Silver
2010	Stadium Southland, Invercargill	(New Zealand) Oliver Leydon-Davis	(Australia) Ross Smith (Australia) Glenn Warfe	19–21, 12–21	Silver

Mixed doubles
Year	Venue	Partner	Opponent	Score	Result
2006	North Harbour Badminton Centre, Auckland, New Zealand	(New Zealand) Lianne Shirley	(New Zealand) Daniel Shirley (New Zealand) Sara Runesten-Petersen	10–21, 8–21	Bronze
2008	Salle Veyret, Nouméa, New Caledonia	(New Zealand) Donna Haliday	(New Zealand) Craig Cooper (New Zealand) Renee Flavell	16–21, 21–19, 21–17	Gold
2010	Stadium Southland, Invercargill, New Zealand	(New Zealand) Donna Haliday	(Australia) Glenn Warfe (Australia) Kate Wilson-Smith	11–21, 10–21	Silver

=== BWF Grand Prix ===
The BWF Grand Prix had two levels, the BWF Grand Prix and Grand Prix Gold. It was a series of badminton tournaments sanctioned by the Badminton World Federation (BWF) which was held from 2007 to 2017.

Mixed doubles
Year	Tournament	Partner	Opponent	Score	Result
2009	Australian Open	(New Zealand) Donna Haliday	(Hong Kong) Yohan Hadikusumo Wiratama (Hong Kong) Chau Hoi Wah	11–21, 5–21	(silver) Runner-up

BWF Grand Prix Gold tournament
BWF Grand Prix tournament

=== BWF International Challenge/Series ===
Men's doubles
Year	Tournament	Partner	Opponent	Score	Result
2006	North Harbour International	(New Zealand) Joe Wu	(New Zealand) Craig Cooper (New Zealand) Daniel Shirley	11–21, 20–22	(silver) Runner-up
2007	North Shore City International	(New Zealand) Nathan Hannam	(New Zealand) Alan Chan (New Zealand) John Moody	21–18, 14–21, 9–21	(silver) Runner-up
2009	Nouméa International	(New Zealand) Oliver Leydon-Davis	(New Zealand) Kevin Dennerly-Minturn (New Zealand) Joe Wu	21–17, 22–24, 21–16	(gold) Winner

Mixed doubles
Year	Tournament	Partner	Opponent	Score	Result
2008	Waikato International	(New Zealand) Donna Haliday	(Japan) Naomasa Senkyo (Japan) Misaki Matsutomo	21–13, 21–18	(gold) Winner
2008	North Shore City International	(New Zealand) Donna Haliday	(New Zealand) Joe Wu (New Zealand) Danielle Barry	21–14, 21–12	(gold) Winner
2009	Victoria International	(New Zealand) Donna Haliday	(Australia) Raj Veeran (Australia) Renuga Veeran	12–21, 15–21	(silver) Runner-up
2009	Nouméa International	(New Zealand) Donna Haliday	(New Zealand) Kevin Dennerly-Minturn (Australia) Louise McKenzie	21–19, 21–15	(gold) Winner
2009	Cyprus International	(New Zealand) Donna Haliday	(Wales) Richard Vaughan (Wales) Sarah Thomas	21–18, 21–14	(gold) Winner

BWF International Challenge tournament
BWF International Series tournament
BWF Future Series tournament
