= 2024 Badminton Asia Team Championships – Men's team event =

Men's team at the 2024 Badminton Asia Team Championships
- Venue: Setia City Convention Centre
- Location: Shah Alam, Selangor, Malaysia
- Dates: 13–18 February 2024
- Nations: 15

Medalists
gold medal	China
silver medal	Malaysia
bronze medal	Japan
bronze medal	South Korea

The men's team event at the 2024 Badminton Asia Team Championships took place from 13 to 18 February at the Setia City Convention Centre in Shah Alam, Selangor, Malaysia. Malaysia were the winner in the previous edition.

== Seeds ==
The seeds were announced on 9 January 2024 based on the BWF World Team Rankings.

1. China (champions)
2. Indonesia (quarter-finals)
3. Japan (semi-finals)
4. Malaysia (final)

== Group stage ==
The draw was held on 30 January 2024. The men's team group stages consist of 4 groups: A, B, C, and D.

Group A	Group B	Group C	Group D
China (1); India; Hong Kong	Malaysia (4, H); Chinese Taipei; Kazakhstan; Brunei	Japan (3); Thailand; Singapore; Myanmar	Indonesia (2); South Korea; United Arab Emirates; Saudi Arabia

== Group stage ==
All times are Malaysia Standard Time (UTC+08:00).

=== Group A ===
Pos	Team	Pld	W	L	MF	MA	MD	GF	GA	GD	PF	PA	PD	Pts	Qualification
1	China	2	2	0	8	2	+6	17	6	+11	453	356	+97	2	Knockout stage
2	India	2	1	1	6	4	+2	13	9	+4	398	373	+25	1	Knockout stage
3	Hong Kong	2	0	2	1	9	−8	3	18	−15	301	423	−122	0	

==== China vs Hong Kong ====
China
5
Setia City Convention Centre, Court 1
13 February 2024, 13:00

Hong Kong
0

			1	2	3
1	(China) (Hong Kong)	Weng Hongyang; Lee Cheuk Yiu	21; 15	21; 17
2	(China) (Hong Kong)	Chen Boyang / Liu Yi; Lui Chun Wai / Yeung Shing Choi	21; 14	21; 12
3	(China) (Hong Kong)	Lei Lanxi; Ng Ka Long	13; 21	21; 16	21; 15
4	(China) (Hong Kong)	Xie Haonan / Zeng Weihan; Chow Hin Long / Hung Kuei Chun	21; 13	21; 8
5	(China) (Hong Kong)	Wang Zhengxing; Chan Yin Chak	21; 11	21; 16

==== India vs Hong Kong ====
India
4
Setia City Convention Centre, Court 2
14 February 2024, 13:00

Hong Kong
1

			1	2	3
1	(India) (Hong Kong)	Prannoy H. S. Ng Ka Long	18; 21	14; 21
2	(India) (Hong Kong)	Satwiksairaj Rankireddy / Chirag Shetty; Lui Chun Wai / Yeung Shing Choi	21; 16	21; 11
3	(India) (Hong Kong)	Lakshya Sen; Chan Yin Chak	21; 14	21; 9
4	(India) (Hong Kong)	Arjun M. R. / Dhruv Kapila; Chow Hin Long / Hung Kuei Chun	21; 12	21; 7
5	(India) (Hong Kong)	Srikanth Kidambi; Jason Gunawan	21; 14	21; 18

==== China vs India ====
China
3
Setia City Convention Centre, Court 3
15 February 2024, 13:00

India
2

			1	2	3
1	(China) (India)	Weng Hongyang; Prannoy H. S.	21; 6	18; 21	19; 21
2	(China) (India)	Chen Boyang / Liu Yi; Arjun M. R. / Dhruv Kapila	21; 15	19; 21	21; 19
3	(China) (India)	Lei Lanxi; Lakshya Sen	11; 21	16; 21
4	(China) (India)	Ren Xiangyu / Xie Haonan; Suraj Goala / Pruthvi Krishnamurthy Roy	21; 13	21; 9
5	(China) (India)	Wang Zhengxing; Chirag Sen	21; 15	21; 16

=== Group B ===
Pos	Team	Pld	W	L	MF	MA	MD	GF	GA	GD	PF	PA	PD	Pts	Qualification
1	Malaysia	3	3	0	13	2	+11	26	4	+22	614	341	+273	3	Knockout stage
2	Chinese Taipei	3	2	1	12	3	+9	24	6	+18	604	365	+239	2	Knockout stage
3	Kazakhstan	3	1	2	4	11	−7	8	22	−14	393	564	−171	1	
4	Brunei	3	0	3	1	14	−13	2	28	−26	290	631	−341	0	

==== Chinese Taipei vs Kazakhstan ====
Chinese Taipei
5
Setia City Convention Centre, Court 3
13 February 2024, 17:00

Kazakhstan
0

			1	2	3
1	(Chinese Taipei) (Kazakhstan)	Lin Chun-yi; Dmitriy Panarin	21; 16	21; 15
2	(Chinese Taipei) (Kazakhstan)	Wang Tzu-wei; Khaitmurat Kulmatov	21; 6	21; 13
3	(Chinese Taipei) (Kazakhstan)	Lee Chia-hao; Makhsut Tajibullayev	21; 7	21; 8
4	(Chinese Taipei) (Kazakhstan)	Lee Jhe-huei / Yang Po-hsuan; Khaitmurat Kulmatov / Dmitriy Panarin	21; 11	21; 11
5	(Chinese Taipei) (Kazakhstan)	Lee Yang / Wang Chi-lin; Ratmir Gilmanov / Makhsut Tajibullayev	21; 7	21; 5

==== Malaysia vs Brunei ====
Malaysia
5
Setia City Convention Centre, Court 1
13 February 2024, 17:00

Brunei
0

			1	2	3
1	(Malaysia) (Brunei)	Ng Tze Yong; Kan Kah Kit	21; 7	21; 11
2	(Malaysia) (Brunei)	Leong Jun Hao; Marhanif Ali	21; 5	21; 6
3	(Malaysia) (Brunei)	Eogene Ewe; Mattew Minggat	21; 8	21; 4
4	(Malaysia) (Brunei)	Choong Hon Jian / Muhammad Haikal; Marhanif Ali / Haziq Roze	21; 5	21; 12
5	(Malaysia) (Brunei)	Goh Sze Fei / Nur Izzuddin; Mattew Minggat / Mohamad Iqbal Asyraf Mohamad	21; 9	21; 7

==== Chinese Taipei vs Brunei ====
Chinese Taipei
5
Setia City Convention Centre, Court 2
14 February 2024, 17:00

Brunei
0

			1	2	3
1	(Chinese Taipei) (Brunei)	Lin Chun-yi; Kan Kah Kit	21; 12	21; 1
2	(Chinese Taipei) (Brunei)	Lee Chia-hao; Marhanif Ali	21; 14	21; 10
3	(Chinese Taipei) (Brunei)	Chi Yu-jen; Mattew Minggat	21; 2	21; 5
4	(Chinese Taipei) (Brunei)	Lee Jhe-huei / Wang Chi-lin; Marhanif Ali / Haziq Roze	21; 8	21; 6
5	(Chinese Taipei) (Brunei)	Lu Ching-yao / Yang Po-han; Mattew Minggat / Mohamad Iqbal Asyraf Mohamad	21; 8	21; 6

==== Kazakhstan vs Brunei ====
Kazakhstan
4
Setia City Convention Centre, Court 2
15 February 2024, 13:00

Brunei
1

			1	2	3
1	(Kazakhstan) (Brunei)	Dmitriy Panarin; Kan Kah Kit	21; 2	21; 5
2	(Kazakhstan) (Brunei)	Khaitmurat Kulmatov; Marhanif Ali	22; 20	22; 20
3	(Kazakhstan) (Brunei)	Makhsut Tajibullayev; Mattew Minggat	21; 10	21; 14
4	(Kazakhstan) (Brunei)	Khaitmurat Kulmatov / Dmitriy Panarin; Marhanif Ali / Haziq Roze	24; 22	21; 8
5	(Kazakhstan) (Brunei)	Ratmir Gilmanov / Makhsut Tajibullayev; Mattew Minggat / Mohamad Iqbal Asyraf Mohamad	20; 22	18; 21

==== Malaysia vs Kazakhstan ====
Malaysia
5
Setia City Convention Centre, Court 1
14 February 2024, 17:00

Kazakhstan
0

			1	2	3
1	(Malaysia) (Kazakhstan)	Lee Zii Jia; Dmitriy Panarin	21; 11	21; 10
2	(Malaysia) (Kazakhstan)	Leong Jun Hao; Bayken Ibray	21; 8	21; 11
3	(Malaysia) (Kazakhstan)	Eogene Ewe; Makhsut Tajibullayev	21; 7	21; 9
4	(Malaysia) (Kazakhstan)	Choong Hon Jian / Muhammad Haikal; Ratmir Gilmanov / Bayken Ibray	21; 10	21; 9
5	(Malaysia) (Kazakhstan)	Goh Sze Fei / Nur Izzuddin; Khaitmurat Kulmatov / Makhsut Tajibullayev	21; 6	21; 2

==== Malaysia vs Chinese Taipei ====
Malaysia
3
Setia City Convention Centre, Court 1
15 February 2024, 17:00

Chinese Taipei
2

			1	2	3
1	(Malaysia) (Chinese Taipei)	Lee Zii Jia; Lin Chun-yi	21; 16	21; 13
2	(Malaysia) (Chinese Taipei)	Aaron Chia / Soh Wooi Yik; Lee Jhe-huei / Lee Yang	21; 23	17; 21
3	(Malaysia) (Chinese Taipei)	Leong Jun Hao; Lee Chia-hao	21; 19	21; 17
4	(Malaysia) (Chinese Taipei)	Goh Sze Fei / Nur Izzuddin; Wang Chi-lin / Yang Po-han	21; 19	21; 14
5	(Malaysia) (Chinese Taipei)	Eogene Ewe; Chi Yu-jen	16; 21	14; 21

=== Group C ===
Pos	Team	Pld	W	L	MF	MA	MD	GF	GA	GD	PF	PA	PD	Pts	Qualification
1	Japan	3	3	0	14	1	+13	28	2	+26	620	357	+263	3	Knockout stage
2	Singapore	3	2	1	8	7	+1	16	15	+1	566	536	+30	2	Knockout stage
3	Thailand	3	1	2	7	8	−1	14	16	−2	538	535	+3	1	
4	Myanmar	3	0	3	1	14	−13	3	28	−25	335	631	−296	0	

==== Japan vs Myanmar ====
Japan
5
Setia City Convention Centre, Court 3
13 February 2024, 13:00

Myanmar
0

			1	2	3
1	(Japan) (Myanmar)	Koki Watanabe; Phone Pyae Naing	21; 6	13; 3		retired
2	(Japan) (Myanmar)	Takuma Obayashi; Hein Htut	21; 14	21; 12
3	(Japan) (Myanmar)	Kento Momota; Min Htet Kaung	21; 9	21; 5
4	(Japan) (Myanmar)	Kenya Mitsuhashi / Hiroki Okamura; Hein Htut / Phone Pyae Naing	0; 0			retired
5	(Japan) (Myanmar)	Kazuki Shibata / Naoki Yamada; Zaw Lin Htoo / Min Htet Kaung	21; 5	21; 5

==== Thailand vs Singapore ====
Thailand
2
Setia City Convention Centre, Court 2
13 February 2024, 17:00

Singapore
3

			1	2	3
1	(Thailand) (Singapore)	Panitchaphon Teeraratsakul; Loh Kean Yew	22; 24	11; 21
2	(Thailand) (Singapore)	Pharanyu Kaosamaang / Worrapol Thongsa-nga; Loh Kean Hean / Howin Wong	21; 11	22; 20
3	(Thailand) (Singapore)	Puritat Arree; Jason Teh	14; 21	16; 21
4	(Thailand) (Singapore)	Peeratchai Sukphun / Pakkapon Teeraratsakul; Wesley Koh / Junsuke Kubo	21; 16	21; 16
5	(Thailand) (Singapore)	Tanawat Yimjit; Joel Koh	20; 22	16; 21

==== Japan vs Singapore ====
Japan
5
Setia City Convention Centre, Court 1
14 February 2024, 13:00

Singapore
0

			1	2	3
1	(Japan) (Singapore)	Kenta Nishimoto; Loh Kean Yew	21; 14	21; 15
2	(Japan) (Singapore)	Akira Koga / Taichi Saito; Nge Joo Jin / Johann Prajogo	21; 16	21; 12
3	(Japan) (Singapore)	Koki Watanabe; Joel Koh	21; 19	21; 14
4	(Japan) (Singapore)	Kenya Mitsuhashi / Hiroki Okamura; Loh Kean Hean / Howin Wong	21; 12	21; 19
5	(Japan) (Singapore)	Kento Momota; Marcus Lau	21; 16	21; 9

==== Thailand vs Myanmar ====
Thailand
4
Setia City Convention Centre, Court 3
14 February 2024, 13:00

Myanmar
1

			1	2	3
1	(Thailand) (Myanmar)	Puritat Arree; Phone Pyae Naing	16; 21	18; 21
2	(Thailand) (Myanmar)	Tanawat Yimjit; Zaw Lin Htoo	21; 19	21; 17
3	(Thailand) (Myanmar)	Wongsup Wongsup-in; Nyan Shaine Lin	21; 7	21; 11
4	(Thailand) (Myanmar)	Tanadon Punpanich / Wachirawit Sothon; Hein Htut / Phone Pyae Naing	21; 10	21; 17
5	(Thailand) (Myanmar)	Peeratchai Sukphun / Pakkapon Teeraratsakul; Zaw Lin Htoo / Min Htet Kaung	21; 3	21; 8

==== Japan vs Thailand ====
Japan
4
Setia City Convention Centre, Court 2
15 February 2024, 17:00

Thailand
1

			1	2	3
1	(Japan) (Thailand)	Koki Watanabe; Panitchaphon Teeraratsakul	21; 13	21; 17
2	(Japan) (Thailand)	Akira Koga / Taichi Saito; Pharanyu Kaosamaang / Worrapol Thongsa-nga	21; 14	21; 13
3	(Japan) (Thailand)	Takuma Obayashi; Tanawat Yimjit	21; 9	21; 19
4	(Japan) (Thailand)	Kenya Mitsuhashi / Hiroki Okamura; Peeratchai Sukphun / Pakkapon Teeraratsakul	15; 21	25; 27
5	(Japan) (Thailand)	Kento Momota; Wongsup Wongsup-in	21; 14	21; 5

==== Singapore vs Myanmar ====
Singapore
5
Setia City Convention Centre, Court 3
15 February 2024, 17:00

Myanmar
0

			1	2	3
1	(Singapore) (Myanmar)	Jason Teh; Phone Pyae Naing	17; 21	21; 11	21; 5
2	(Singapore) (Myanmar)	Joel Koh; Hein Htut	21; 18	21; 15
3	(Singapore) (Myanmar)	Marcus Lau; Min Htet Kaung	21; 12	21; 11
4	(Singapore) (Myanmar)	Wesley Koh / Junsuke Kubo; Hein Htut / Phone Pyae Naing	21; 13	21; 5
5	(Singapore) (Myanmar)	Nge Joo Jin / Johann Prajogo; Zaw Lin Htoo / Min Htet Kaung	21; 14	21; 17

=== Group D ===
Pos	Team	Pld	W	L	MF	MA	MD	GF	GA	GD	PF	PA	PD	Pts	Qualification
1	South Korea	3	3	0	13	2	+11	27	6	+21	681	404	+277	3	Knockout stage
2	Indonesia	3	2	1	12	3	+9	26	8	+18	684	438	+246	2	Knockout stage
3	United Arab Emirates	3	1	2	5	10	−5	11	20	−9	427	524	−97	1	
4	Saudi Arabia	3	0	3	0	15	−15	0	30	−30	204	630	−426	0	

==== Indonesia vs Saudi Arabia ====
Indonesia
5
Setia City Convention Centre, Court 2
13 February 2024, 13:00

Saudi Arabia
0

			1	2	3
1	(Indonesia) (Saudi Arabia)	Chico Aura Dwi Wardoyo; Mahd Shaikh	21; 6	21; 10
2	(Indonesia) (Saudi Arabia)	Alwi Farhan; Muath Al-Ghamdi	21; 2	21; 10
3	(Indonesia) (Saudi Arabia)	Yohanes Saut Marcellyno; Yazan Saigh	21; 3	21; 2
4	(Indonesia) (Saudi Arabia)	Leo Rolly Carnando / Daniel Marthin; Muath Al-Ghamdi / Fahad Al-Malki	21; 5	21; 4
5	(Indonesia) (Saudi Arabia)	Muhammad Shohibul Fikri / Bagas Maulana; Yazan Saigh / Mahd Shaikh	21; 7	21; 7

==== South Korea vs United Arab Emirates ====
South Korea
5
Setia City Convention Centre, Court 4
13 February 2024, 17:00

United Arab Emirates
0

			1	2	3
1	(South Korea) (United Arab Emirates)	Cho Geon-yeop; Somi Romdhani	21; 13	21; 18
2	(South Korea) (United Arab Emirates)	Kang Min-hyuk / Seo Seung-jae; Dev Ayyappan / Dhiren Ayyappan	21; 7	21; 8
3	(South Korea) (United Arab Emirates)	Jeong Min-seon; Mohammed Munawar	21; 10	21; 8
4	(South Korea) (United Arab Emirates)	Jin Yong / Ki Dong-ju; Imam Adi Kusuma Atmaja / Kuswanto	21; 12	21; 9
5	(South Korea) (United Arab Emirates)	Woo Seung-hoon; Aakash Ravikumar	21; 7	21; 4

==== South Korea vs Saudi Arabia ====
South Korea
5
Setia City Convention Centre, Court 4
14 February 2024, 13:00

Saudi Arabia
0

			1	2	3
1	(South Korea) (Saudi Arabia)	Jeon Hyeok-jin; Mahd Shaikh	21; 13	21; 10
2	(South Korea) (Saudi Arabia)	Lee Yun-gyu; Muath Al-Ghamdi	21; 7	21; 4
3	(South Korea) (Saudi Arabia)	Woo Seung-hoon; Yazan Saigh	21; 6	21; 3
4	(South Korea) (Saudi Arabia)	Ki Dong-ju / Kim Won-ho; Muath Al-Ghamdi / Fahad Al-Malki	21; 4	21; 9
5	(South Korea) (Saudi Arabia)	Kang Min-hyuk / Seo Seung-jae; Yazan Saigh / Mahd Shaikh	21; 3	21; 5

==== Indonesia vs United Arab Emirates ====
Indonesia
5
Setia City Convention Centre, Court 3
14 February 2024, 17:00

United Arab Emirates
0

			1	2	3
1	(Indonesia) (United Arab Emirates)	Chico Aura Dwi Wardoyo; Somi Romdhani	21; 11	21; 15
2	(Indonesia) (United Arab Emirates)	Leo Rolly Carnando / Daniel Marthin; Dev Ayyappan / Dhiren Ayyappan	21; 11	21; 9
3	(Indonesia) (United Arab Emirates)	Alwi Farhan; Bharath Latheesh	21; 10	21; 9
4	(Indonesia) (United Arab Emirates)	Rahmat Hidayat / Yeremia Rambitan; Imam Adi Kusuma Atmaja / Aakash Ravikumar	21; 10	21; 12
5	(Indonesia) (United Arab Emirates)	Alvi Wijaya Chairullah; Mohammed Munawar	20; 22	21; 4	21; 8

==== Indonesia vs South Korea ====
Indonesia
2
Setia City Convention Centre, Court 1
15 February 2024, 13:00

South Korea
3

			1	2	3
1	(Indonesia) (South Korea)	Chico Aura Dwi Wardoyo; Lee Yun-gyu	21; 17	21; 23	22; 20
2	(Indonesia) (South Korea)	Muhammad Shohibul Fikri / Bagas Maulana; Kang Min-hyuk / Seo Seung-jae	24; 26	20; 22
3	(Indonesia) (South Korea)	Alwi Farhan; Cho Geon-yeop	21; 13	22; 20
4	(Indonesia) (South Korea)	Leo Rolly Carnando / Daniel Marthin; Ki Dong-ju / Kim Won-ho	21; 18	15; 21	12; 21
5	(Indonesia) (South Korea)	Yohanes Saut Marcellyno; Woo Seung-hoon	13; 21	21; 18	11; 21

==== United Arab Emirates vs Saudi Arabia ====
United Arab Emirates
5
Setia City Convention Centre, Court 4
15 February 2024, 13:00

Saudi Arabia
0

			1	2	3
1	(United Arab Emirates) (Saudi Arabia)	Somi Romdhani; Mahd Shaikh	21; 17	21; 8
2	(United Arab Emirates) (Saudi Arabia)	Bharath Latheesh; Muath Al-Ghamdi	21; 6	21; 5
3	(United Arab Emirates) (Saudi Arabia)	Kuswanto; Fahad Al-Malki	21; 6	21; 3
4	(United Arab Emirates) (Saudi Arabia)	Dev Ayyappan / Dhiren Ayyappan; Yazan Saigh / Mahd Shaikh	21; 8	21; 12
5	(United Arab Emirates) (Saudi Arabia)	Imam Adi Kusuma Atmaja / Kuswanto; Muath Al-Ghamdi / Fahad Al-Malki	21; 13	21; 6

== Knockout stage ==
=== Bracket ===
Quarter-finals
16 February 16:00
China (1)	3
Indonesia (2)	2
16 February 16:00
South Korea	3
Chinese Taipei	2
16 February 16:00
Singapore	1
Malaysia (4)	3
16 February 16:00
India	2
Japan (3)	3

Semi-finals
17 February 16:00
China (1)	3
South Korea	2
17 February 16:00
Malaysia (4)	3
Japan (3)	1

Final
18 February 16:00
China (1)	3
Malaysia (4)	0

=== Quarter-finals ===
==== Singapore vs Malaysia ====
Singapore
1
Setia City Convention Centre, Court 1
16 February 2024, 16:00

Malaysia
3

			1	2	3
1	(Singapore) (Malaysia)	Jason Teh; Ng Tze Yong	3; 1			retired
2	(Singapore) (Malaysia)	Loh Kean Hean / Howin Wong; Aaron Chia / Soh Wooi Yik	11; 21	24; 22	14; 21
3	(Singapore) (Malaysia)	Joel Koh; Leong Jun Hao	8; 21	12; 21
4	(Singapore) (Malaysia)	Wesley Koh / Junsuke Kubo; Goh Sze Fei / Nur Izzuddin	6; 21	22; 20	8; 21
5	(Singapore) (Malaysia)	Marcus Lau; Eogene Ewe				not played

==== China vs Indonesia ====
China
3
Setia City Convention Centre, Court 2
16 February 2024, 16:00

Indonesia
2

			1	2	3
1	(China) (Indonesia)	Weng Hongyang; Chico Aura Dwi Wardoyo	21; 11	21; 11
2	(China) (Indonesia)	He Jiting / Ren Xiangyu; Muhammad Shohibul Fikri / Bagas Maulana	19; 21	19; 21
3	(China) (Indonesia)	Lei Lanxi; Alwi Farhan	21; 14	21; 10
4	(China) (Indonesia)	Chen Boyang / Liu Yi; Leo Rolly Carnando / Daniel Marthin	14; 21	18; 21
5	(China) (Indonesia)	Wang Zhengxing; Yohanes Saut Marcellyno	21; 15	24; 22

==== South Korea vs Chinese Taipei ====
South Korea
3
Setia City Convention Centre, Court 3
16 February 2024, 16:00

Chinese Taipei
2

			1	2	3
1	(South Korea) (Chinese Taipei)	Jeon Hyeok-jin; Lin Chun-yi	21; 17	18; 21	11; 21
2	(South Korea) (Chinese Taipei)	Kang Min-hyuk / Seo Seung-jae; Lee Yang / Wang Chi-lin	21; 14	21; 14
3	(South Korea) (Chinese Taipei)	Lee Yun-gyu; Lee Chia-hao	21; 18	21; 14
4	(South Korea) (Chinese Taipei)	Jin Yong / Kim Won-ho; Lee Jhe-huei / Yang Po-hsuan	10; 21	21; 16	13; 21
5	(South Korea) (Chinese Taipei)	Jeong Min-seon; Chi Yu-jen	21; 19	21; 15

==== India vs Japan ====
India
2
Setia City Convention Centre, Court 4
16 February 2024, 16:00

Japan
3

			1	2	3
1	(India) (Japan)	Prannoy H. S. Kenta Nishimoto	16; 21	24; 26
2	(India) (Japan)	Satwiksairaj Rankireddy / Chirag Shetty; Kenya Mitsuhashi / Hiroki Okamura	21; 15	21; 17
3	(India) (Japan)	Lakshya Sen; Koki Watanabe	21; 19	22; 20
4	(India) (Japan)	Arjun M. R. / Dhruv Kapila; Akira Koga / Kazuki Shibata	17; 21	15; 21
5	(India) (Japan)	Srikanth Kidambi; Kento Momota	21; 17	9; 21	20; 22

=== Semi-finals ===
==== Malaysia vs Japan ====
Malaysia
3
Setia City Convention Centre, Court 1
17 February 2024, 16:00

Japan
1

			1	2	3
1	(Malaysia) (Japan)	Lee Zii Jia; Kenta Nishimoto	21; 18	21; 15
2	(Malaysia) (Japan)	Aaron Chia / Soh Wooi Yik; Akira Koga / Taichi Saito	15; 21	21; 17	21; 10
3	(Malaysia) (Japan)	Leong Jun Hao; Koki Watanabe	21; 19	12; 21	19; 21
4	(Malaysia) (Japan)	Goh Sze Fei / Nur Izzuddin; Kenya Mitsuhashi / Hiroki Okamura	21; 15	21; 19
5	(Malaysia) (Japan)	Eogene Ewe; Kento Momota				not played

==== China vs South Korea ====
China
3
Setia City Convention Centre, Court 2
17 February 2024, 16:00

South Korea
2

			1	2	3
1	(China) (South Korea)	Weng Hongyang; Cho Geon-yeop	21; 11	16; 21	21; 15
2	(China) (South Korea)	Chen Boyang / Liu Yi; Kang Min-hyuk / Seo Seung-jae	20; 22	5; 21
3	(China) (South Korea)	Lu Guangzu; Jeong Min-seon	21; 15	21; 19
4	(China) (South Korea)	Ren Xiangyu / Xie Haonan; Ki Dong-ju / Kim Won-ho	21; 17	17; 21	13; 21
5	(China) (South Korea)	Lei Lanxi; Woo Seung-hoon	21; 11	21; 10

=== Final ===
==== China vs Malaysia ====
China
3
Setia City Convention Centre, Court 1
18 February 2024, 16:00

Malaysia
0

			1	2	3
1	(China) (Malaysia)	Weng Hongyang; Leong Jun Hao	21; 19	21; 17
2	(China) (Malaysia)	Xie Haonan / Zeng Weihan; Aaron Chia / Soh Wooi Yik	21; 16	16; 21	23; 21
3	(China) (Malaysia)	Lei Lanxi; Eogene Ewe	21; 10	21; 14
4	(China) (Malaysia)	Ren Xiangyu / Liu Yi; Goh Sze Fei / Nur Izzuddin				not played
5	(China) (Malaysia)	Wang Zhengxing; Muhammad Haikal				not played

== Final ranking ==
Pos	Team	Pld	W	L	Pts	MD	GD	PD	Final result
1st place, gold medalist(s)	China	5	5	0	10	+11	+20	+169	Champions
2nd place, silver medalist(s)	Malaysia	6	5	1	10	+12	+24	+325	Runners-up
3rd place, bronze medalist(s)	Japan	5	4	1	8	+12	+23	+259	Eliminated in semi-finals
3rd place, bronze medalist(s)	South Korea	5	4	1	8	+11	+23	+272	Eliminated in semi-finals
5	Indonesia	4	2	2	4	+8	+16	+214	Eliminated in quarter-finals
6	Chinese Taipei	4	2	2	4	+8	+14	+230	Eliminated in quarter-finals
7	Singapore	4	2	2	4	−1	−2	−31	Eliminated in quarter-finals
8	India	3	1	2	2	+1	+3	+12	Eliminated in quarter-finals
9	Thailand	3	1	2	2	−1	−2	+3	Eliminated in group stage
10	United Arab Emirates	3	1	2	2	−5	−9	−97	Eliminated in group stage
11	Kazakhstan	3	1	2	2	−7	−14	−171	Eliminated in group stage
12	Hong Kong	2	0	2	0	−8	−15	−122	Eliminated in group stage
13	Myanmar	3	0	3	0	−13	−25	−296	Eliminated in group stage
14	Brunei	3	0	3	0	−13	−26	−341	Eliminated in group stage
15	Saudi Arabia	3	0	3	0	−15	−30	−426	Eliminated in group stage
