= 2026 Vietnam Open =

2026 badminton tournament

Tournament details
- Dates: 8–13 September
- Edition: 21st
- Level: Super 100
- Total prize money: US$120,000
- Venue: Nguyen Du Club
- Location: Ho Chi Minh City, Vietnam

Champions
- Men's singles: (Malaysia) Aidil Sholeh
- Women's singles: (Thailand) Sarunrak Vitidsarn
- Men's doubles: (Chinese Taipei) Chen Zhi-ray (Chinese Taipei) Lin Yu-chieh
- Women's doubles: (South Korea) Kim Yu-jung (South Korea) Lee Yu-lim
- Mixed doubles: (China) Ma Xixiang (China) Qin Huizhi

The 2026 Vietnam Open (officially known as the Yonex-Sunrise Vietnam Open 2026 for sponsorship reasons) was a badminton tournament which took place at Nguyen Du Club in Ho Chi Minh City, Vietnam, from 8 to 13 September 2026 and had a total purse of $120,000.

== Tournament ==
The 2026 Vietnam Open was the twenty-fifth tournament of the 2026 BWF World Tour and also part of the Vietnam Open championships, which had been held since 1996. This tournament was organized by the Vietnam Badminton Association and sanctioned by the BWF.

=== Venue ===
This tournament was held at Nguyen Du Club in Ho Chi Minh City, Vietnam.

=== Point distribution ===
Below is a table with the point distribution for each phase of the tournament based on the BWF points system for the BWF Tour Super 100 event.

Winner	Runner-up	3/4	5/8	9/16	17/32	33/64	65/128	129/256
5,500	4,680	3,850	3,030	2,110	1,290	510	240	100

=== Prize money ===
The total prize money for this tournament was US$120,000. Distribution of prize money was in accordance with BWF regulations.

Event	Winner	Finals	Semi-finals	Quarter-finals	Last 16
Singles	$8,250	$4,180	$1,595	$660	$385
Doubles	$8,690	$4,180	$1,540	$797.5	$412.5

== Men's singles ==
=== Seeds ===
1. (Singapore) Jason Teh (final)
2. (Hong Kong) Jason Gunawan (withdrew)
3. (India) Prannoy H. S. (semi-finals)
4. (Chinese Taipei) Wang Po-wei (second round)
5. (China) Dong Tianyao (quarter-finals)
6. (India) Kiran George (third round)
7. (China) Zhu Xuanchen (quarter-finals)
8. (Chinese Taipei) Wang Yu-kai (second round)

=== Finals ===
Semi-finals
1	(Singapore) Jason Teh	21	21
3	(India) Prannoy H. S.	13	8
SWM	(Japan) Minoru Koga	21	15	17
(Malaysia) Aidil Sholeh	14	21	21

Final
1	(Singapore) Jason Teh	16	14
(Malaysia) Aidil Sholeh	21	21

=== Top half ===
==== Section 1 ====
First round
Q5	(Vietnam) Phan P T	14	16
(India) Manr Singh	21	21
(Vietnam) Lê Ð P	21	11	18
PFQ	(Singapore) J Koh	16	21	21
(Chinese Taipei) Liao J-f	21	15	11
(India) P Katta	17	21	21
(India) R Chouhan	21	21
(India) P Shettigar	15	11

Second round
1	(Singapore) J Teh	21	21
(India) Manr Singh	14	15
PFQ	(China) Wang ZJ	21	21	21
PFQ	(Singapore) J Koh	23	9	8
7	(China) Zhu XC	18	21	21
(India) P Katta	21	15	12
(Japan) S Ogawa	13	16
(India) R Chouhan	21	21

Third round
1	(Singapore) J Teh	16	24	21
PFQ	(China) Wang ZJ	21	22	12
7	(China) Zhu XC	21	11	25
(India) R Chouhan	16	21	23

Quarter-finals
1	(Singapore) J Teh	21	21
7	(China) Zhu XC	13	19

==== Section 2 ====
First round
(Malaysia) Huan K H	11	10
(Malaysia) Kok J H	21	21
Q8	(Vietnam) Nguyễn T M	6	14
(Chinese Taipei) Wu Z-y	21	21
Q7	(Thailand) W Wongsup-In	21	21
(Finland) K Koljonen	19	16
Q1	(India) S Saraswat	21	21
(Philippines) C Villaflor	11	11

Second round
3	(India) Prannoy H. S.	14	25	21
(Malaysia) Kok J H	21	23	12
(Malaysia) Lee Z J	8	21	14
(Chinese Taipei) Wu Z-y	21	13	21
6	(India) K George	21	19	21
Q7	(Thailand) W Wongsup-In	16	21	16
Q4	(South Korea) Kim H-d	19	16
Q1	(India) S Saraswat	21	21

Third round
3	(India) Prannoy H. S.	21	13	21
(Chinese Taipei) Wu Z-y	15	21	14
6	(India) K George	12	21	18
Q1	(India) S Saraswat	21	10	21

Quarter-finals
3	(India) Prannoy H. S.	28	21
Q1	(India) S Saraswat	26	12

=== Bottom half ===
==== Section 3 ====
First round
(Chinese Taipei) Kuo K-l	21	24
(United States) G Tan	19	22
(United States) M S Alcala	16	21	18^{r}
(Chinese Taipei) Huang P-h	21	16	19
(Malaysia) Cheam J W	11	21	0^{r}
(Vietnam) Nguyễn H Ð	21	14	0
(India) T Mannepalli	21	21
PFQ	(Australia) E Stephen Sam	14	16

Second round
(Chinese Taipei) Kuo K-l	15	21	13
(Myanmar) H Htut	21	11	21
(Chinese Taipei) Huang P-h	13	21	10
SWM	(Japan) M Koga	21	12	21
(Vietnam) Nguyễn H Ð	21	21
(India) S Dayanand	15	18
(India) T Mannepalli	21	19	21
8	(Chinese Taipei) Wang Y-k	19	21	15

Third round
(Myanmar) H Htut	13	10
SWM	(Japan) M Koga	21	21
(Vietnam) Nguyễn H Ð	21	21
(India) T Mannepalli	14	13

Quarter-finals
SWM	(Japan) M Koga	22	21
(Vietnam) Nguyễn H Ð	20	12

==== Section 4 ====
First round
Q3	(India) A Bhivpathaki	8	14
(India) A Mishra	21	21
PFQ	(China) Sun C	18	21	18
PFQ	(Malaysia) Tan J J	21	12	21
(India) O Chaliha	10	17
(Malaysia) A Sholeh	21	21
(Malaysia) Lim M H	17	21	21
Q2	(Indonesia) H W Kho	21	15	16

Second round
(India) A Mishra	21	22	21
Q6	(Vietnam) Trần H K	13	24	15
PFQ	(Malaysia) Tan J J	23	12
5	(China) Dong TY	25	21
(Malaysia) A Sholeh	21	21
(Chinese Taipei) Ting Y-c	8	17
(Malaysia) Lim M H	21	15	21
4	(Chinese Taipei) Wang P-w	16	21	13

Third round
(India) A Mishra	15	9
5	(China) Dong TY	21	21
(Malaysia) A Sholeh	21	21
(Malaysia) Lim M H	17	13

Quarter-finals
5	(China) Dong TY	18	17
(Malaysia) A Sholeh	21	21

== Women's singles ==
=== Seeds ===
1. (India) Tanvi Sharma (semi-finals)
2. (Vietnam) Nguyễn Thùy Linh (first round)
3. (India) Isharani Baruah (final)
4. (Denmark) Amalie Schulz (second round)
5. (Chinese Taipei) Tung Ciou-tong (first round)
6. (India) Rakshitha Ramraj (semi-finals)
7. (India) Malvika Bansod (quarter-finals)
8. (India) Anmol Kharb (first round)

=== Finals ===
Semi-finals
1	(India) Tanvi Sharma	19	20
Q2	(Thailand) Sarunrak Vitidsarn	21	22
3	(India) Isharani Baruah	21	21
6	(India) Rakshitha Ramraj	10	18

Final
Q2	(Thailand) Sarunrak Vitidsarn	21	21
3	(India) Isharani Baruah	8	15

=== Top half ===
==== Section 1 ====
First round
1	(India) T Sharma	21	21
(Canada) R Chan	16	17
(Malaysia) Kisona S	3^{r}
Q1	(Thailand) P Phannachet	11
7	(India) M Bansod	26	24
(Chinese Taipei) Liao Y-c	24	22
(Thailand) T Kleebyeesun	16	21	21
(Chinese Taipei) Chen S-y	21	18	11

Second round
1	(India) T Sharma	26	21
Q1	(Thailand) P Phannachet	24	12
7	(India) M Bansod	21	21
(Thailand) T Kleebyeesun	19	14

Quarter-finals
1	(India) T Sharma	21	15	21
7	(India) M Bansod	18	21	14

==== Section 2 ====
First round
4	(Denmark) A Schulz	22	21
(Vietnam) Vũ T T	20	19
(Thailand) T Saeheng	21	21
(Hong Kong) Lo S Y	19	12
8	(India) A Kharb	14	14
Q2	(Thailand) S Vitidsarn	21	21
Q4	(Vietnam) Bùi B P	21	21
(India) T Hemanth	17	17

Second round
4	(Denmark) A Schulz	19	21	9
(Thailand) T Saeheng	21	15	21
Q2	(Thailand) S Vitidsarn	21	21
Q4	(Vietnam) Bùi B P	13	9

Quarter-finals
(Thailand) T Saeheng	18	16
Q2	(Thailand) S Vitidsarn	21	21

=== Bottom half ===
==== Section 3 ====
First round
(Malaysia) S Zulaikha	12	21	21
PFQ	(Hong Kong) Liang K W	21	14	13
(Chinese Taipei) Huang C-p	21	12	21
5	(Chinese Taipei) Tung C-t	13	21	13
Q3	(Chinese Taipei) Liao J-c	16	14
(Malaysia) Goh J W	21	21
(Chinese Taipei) Peng Y-w
3	(India) I Baruah	w	/	o

Second round
(Malaysia) S Zulaikha	16	7
(Chinese Taipei) Huang C-p	21	21
(Malaysia) Goh J W	18	16
3	(India) I Baruah	21	21

Quarter-finals
(Chinese Taipei) Huang C-p	15	18
3	(India) I Baruah	21	21

==== Section 4 ====
First round
(South Korea) Kim M-s	21	21	21
(Chinese Taipei) Pai Y-p	16	23	15
PFQ	(Chinese Taipei) Wang P-y
6	(India) R Ramraj	w	/	o
(United States) I Jaiswal	18	15
(India) Mans Singh	21	21
(China) Xu WJ	21	22
2	(Vietnam) Nguyễn T L	17	20

Second round
(South Korea) Kim M-s	13	20
6	(India) R Ramraj	21	22
(India) Mans Singh	23	21
(China) Xu WJ	21	19

Quarter-finals
6	(India) R Ramraj	21	21
(India) Mans Singh	12	10

== Men's doubles ==
=== Seeds ===
1. (Chinese Taipei) Chen Zhi-ray / Lin Yu-chieh (champions)
2. (Chinese Taipei) He Zhi-wei / Huang Jui-hsuan (second round)
3. (Hong Kong) Hung Kuei Chun / Lui Chun Wai (second round)
4. (Chinese Taipei) Lin Chia-yen / Lin Yong-sheng (first round)
5. (Malaysia) Low Hang Yee / Ng Eng Cheong (first round)
6. (Chinese Taipei) Lai Po-yu / Tsai Fu-cheng (second round)
7. (Malaysia) Choong Hon Jian / Wong Vin Sean (semi-finals)
8. (Singapore) Wesley Koh / Donovan Wee (quarter-finals)

=== Finals ===
Semi-finals
1	(Chinese Taipei) Chen Zhi-ray (Chinese Taipei) Lin Yu-chieh	21	21
7	(Malaysia) Choong Hon Jian (Malaysia) Wong Vin Sean	17	19
(Singapore) Terry Hee (Singapore) Howin Wong	21	8	24
(China) Chen Junting (China) Huang Di	17	21	22

Final
1	(Chinese Taipei) Chen Zhi-ray (Chinese Taipei) Lin Yu-chieh	21	21
(Singapore) Terry Hee (Singapore) Howin Wong	14	12

=== Top half ===
==== Section 1 ====
First round
1	(Chinese Taipei) Chen Z-r (Chinese Taipei) Lin Y-c	21	21
Q4	(Chinese Taipei) Su C-h (Chinese Taipei) Tang K-w	12	15
(Singapore) J Kubo (Singapore) J Prajogo	14	18
(Chinese Taipei) Chen P-h (Chinese Taipei) Lee W-t	21	21
5	(Malaysia) Low H Y (Malaysia) Ng E C	21	15	17
(China) Chen ZH (China) Zhu YP	18	21	21
(South Korea) Na S-s (South Korea) Wang C	21	21
(Thailand) A Sreepeaw (Thailand) L E Wedler	9	15

Second round
1	(Chinese Taipei) Chen Z-r (Chinese Taipei) Lin Y-c	21	12	21
(Chinese Taipei) Chen P-h (Chinese Taipei) Lee W-t	18	21	14
(China) Chen ZH (China) Zhu YP	21	14	21
(South Korea) Na S-s (South Korea) Wang C	13	21	19

Quarter-finals
1	(Chinese Taipei) Chen Z-r (Chinese Taipei) Lin Y-c	21	18	21
(China) Chen ZH (China) Zhu YP	12	21	17

==== Section 2 ====
First round
4	(Chinese Taipei) Lin C-y (Chinese Taipei) Lin Y-s	16	21	14
(Chinese Taipei) Cheng K-w (Chinese Taipei) Liao C-p	21	15	21
(Chinese Taipei) Wei C-w (Chinese Taipei) Yang P-c	21	21
(Malaysia) B Goonting (Malaysia) M Haikal	18	14
7	(Malaysia) Choong H J (Malaysia) Wong V S	18	21	21
PFQ	(Chinese Taipei) Chang K-c (Chinese Taipei) Chen S-f	21	15	17
(Malaysia) Lee Y B (Malaysia) Lim T J	21	21
Q1	(Chinese Taipei) Cheng Y-y (Chinese Taipei) Yu M-h	19	17

Second round
(Chinese Taipei) Cheng K-w (Chinese Taipei) Liao C-p	22	21
(Chinese Taipei) Wei C-w (Chinese Taipei) Yang P-c	20	18
7	(Malaysia) Choong H J (Malaysia) Wong V S	21	21
(Malaysia) Lee Y B (Malaysia) Lim T J	16	11

Quarter-finals
(Chinese Taipei) Cheng K-w (Chinese Taipei) Liao C-p	16	8
7	(Malaysia) Choong H J (Malaysia) Wong V S	21	21

=== Bottom half ===
==== Section 3 ====
First round
PFQ	(Australia) M Owen (Australia) J Yu	22	15	21
Q3	(Malaysia) Goh B Z (Malaysia) F Razif	20	21	15
Q2	(India) K Duwari Anand (India) S Gajendran	15	12
8	(Singapore) W Koh (Singapore) D Wee	21	21
(China) Lin YF (China) Yang JY	19	22	19
(Singapore) T Hee (Singapore) H Wong	21	20	21
(India) Vip Kuvale (India) Vir Kuvale	10	18
3	(Hong Kong) Hung K C (Hong Kong) Lui C W	21	21

Second round
PFQ	(Australia) M Owen (Australia) J Yu	17	15
8	(Singapore) W Koh (Singapore) D Wee	21	21
(Singapore) T Hee (Singapore) H Wong	19	21	21
3	(Hong Kong) Hung K C (Hong Kong) Lui C W	21	15	15

Quarter-finals
8	(Singapore) W Koh (Singapore) D Wee	19	22
(Singapore) T Hee (Singapore) H Wong	21	24

==== Section 4 ====
First round
PFQ	(Chinese Taipei) Hung B-f (Chinese Taipei) Liu F-s	11	17
(China) Chen YR (China) Liu Y	21	21
(Chinese Taipei) Huang T-i (Chinese Taipei) Lin T-y	19	21	12
6	(Chinese Taipei) Lai P-y (Chinese Taipei) Tsai F-c	21	14	21
(China) Chen JT (China) Huang D	21	15	21
(Philippines) S Padiz Jr. (Philippines) J Villabrille	9	21	15
(Vietnam) Nguyễn Đ H (Vietnam) Trần Đ M	15	21	22
2	(Chinese Taipei) He Z-w (Chinese Taipei) Huang J-h	21	19	24

Second round
(China) Chen YR (China) Liu Y	22	19	21
6	(Chinese Taipei) Lai P-y (Chinese Taipei) Tsai F-c	20	21	15
(China) Chen JT (China) Huang D	21	21
2	(Chinese Taipei) He Z-w (Chinese Taipei) Huang J-h	17	15

Quarter-finals
(China) Chen YR (China) Liu Y	16	15
(China) Chen JT (China) Huang D	21	21

== Women's doubles ==
=== Seeds ===
1. (South Korea) Kim Yu-jung / Lee Yu-lim (champions)
2. (Chinese Taipei) Chen Yan-fei / Sun Liang-ching (withdrew)
3. (Vietnam) Phạm Thị Diệu Ly / Phạm Thị Khánh (first round)
4. (Thailand) Tidapron Kleebyeesun / Nattamon Laisuan (semi-finals)
5. (China) Liu Jiayue / Wang Zimeng (final)
6. (Chinese Taipei) Hsieh Yi-en / Teng Chun-hsun (quarter-finals)
7. (Chinese Taipei) Chen Yu-hsuan / Lin Xiao-min (second round)
8. (Thailand) Ornnicha Jongsathapornparn / Sabrina Sophita Wedler (second round)

=== Finals ===
Semi-finals
1	(South Korea) Kim Yu-jung (South Korea) Lee Yu-lim	21	17	23
4	(Thailand) Tidapron Kleebyeesun (Thailand) Nattamon Laisuan	9	21	21
5	(China) Liu Jiayue (China) Wang Zimeng	13	21	21
(Chinese Taipei) Chou Yun-an (Chinese Taipei) Ko Ruo-hsuan	21	14	18

Final
1	(South Korea) Kim Yu-jung (South Korea) Lee Yu-lim	21	10	21
5	(China) Liu Jiayue (China) Wang Zimeng	17	21	14

=== Top half ===
==== Section 1 ====
First round
1	(South Korea) Kim Y-j (South Korea) Lee Y-l	21	21
(Vietnam) Huỳnh K M (Vietnam) Ngô T T	6	7
(India) R Ganesh (India) A Pramuthesh	7	16
Q2	(China) Fu XY (China) Zhou JR	21	21
6	(Chinese Taipei) Hsieh Y-e (Chinese Taipei) Teng C-h	21	21
(India) P Arora (India) D Balasubramanian	8	12
(Chinese Taipei) Chung C-e (Chinese Taipei) Wang Y-z	21	21
(India) N Sunil Oasis (India) V Viswanath Sri	12	17

Second round
1	(South Korea) Kim Y-j (South Korea) Lee Y-l	21	21
Q2	(China) Fu XY (China) Zhou JR	17	7
6	(Chinese Taipei) Hsieh Y-e (Chinese Taipei) Teng C-h	21	21
(Chinese Taipei) Chung C-e (Chinese Taipei) Wang Y-z	9	19

Quarter-finals
1	(South Korea) Kim Y-j (South Korea) Lee Y-l	21	21
6	(Chinese Taipei) Hsieh Y-e (Chinese Taipei) Teng C-h	12	8

==== Section 2 ====
First round
4	(Thailand) T Kleebyeesun (Thailand) N Laisuan	21	17
(Malaysia) D Sofea (Malaysia) Tan Z H	18	7^{r}
(Vietnam) Bùi B P (Vietnam) Vũ T T	12	13
(Malaysia) Cheng S H (Malaysia) Chong J Y	21	21
8	(Thailand) O Jongsathapornparn (Thailand) S S Wedler	21	22	21
PFQ	(Malaysia) V Ng (Malaysia) Tan Z Y	19	24	12
(Hong Kong) Fan K Y (Hong Kong) Leung S L	16	17
(Thailand) K Chaichana (Thailand) P Polyiam	21	21

Second round
4	(Thailand) T Kleebyeesun (Thailand) N Laisuan	21	21
(Malaysia) Cheng S H (Malaysia) Chong J Y	10	18
8	(Thailand) O Jongsathapornparn (Thailand) S S Wedler	16	8
(Thailand) K Chaichana (Thailand) P Polyiam	21	21

Quarter-finals
4	(Thailand) T Kleebyeesun (Thailand) N Laisuan	15	22	21
(Thailand) K Chaichana (Thailand) P Polyiam	21	20	6

=== Bottom half ===
==== Section 3 ====
First round
(Thailand) N Jatupanaporn (Thailand) P Wechawong	19	21	4
Q4	(Chinese Taipei) Chang Y-j (Chinese Taipei) Wang L-h	21	17	21
(China) Ding KY (China) Li HZ	21	14	12
SWM	(China) Liao LX (China) Shen SY	10	21	21
Q1	(Malaysia) N Chau (Malaysia) G Lim	21	21
Q3	(Vietnam) Dao K L (Vietnam) Do T P M	6	18
(Chinese Taipei) Chen S-y (Chinese Taipei) Han C	15	17
5	(China) Liu JY (China) Wang ZM	21	21

Second round
Q4	(Chinese Taipei) Chang Y-j (Chinese Taipei) Wang L-h	14	16
SWM	(China) Liao LX (China) Shen SY	21	21
Q1	(Malaysia) N Chau (Malaysia) G Lim	16	11
5	(China) Liu JY (China) Wang ZM	21	21

Quarter-finals
SWM	(China) Liao LX (China) Shen SY	11	13
5	(China) Liu JY (China) Wang ZM	21	21

==== Section 4 ====
First round
(Individual Neutral Athletes) A Boiarun (Individual Neutral Athletes) D Kharlampovich	21	21
(Chinese Taipei) Liao J-c (Chinese Taipei) Lin Y-y	7	18
(Vietnam) Mai T T N (Vietnam) Nguyễn H H	11	12
7	(Chinese Taipei) Chen Y-h (Chinese Taipei) Lin X-m	21	21
(United Arab Emirates) S S Parol (United Arab Emirates) N Rajesh	19	18
(Vietnam) Nguyễn H T K (Vietnam) Nguyễn T N T	21	21
(Chinese Taipei) Chou Y-a (Chinese Taipei) Ko R-h	21	21
3	(Vietnam) Phạm T D L (Vietnam) Phạm T K	12	16

Second round
(Individual Neutral Athletes) A Boiarun (Individual Neutral Athletes) D Kharlampovich	21	15	21
7	(Chinese Taipei) Chen Y-h (Chinese Taipei) Lin X-m	9	21	13
(Vietnam) Nguyễn H T K (Vietnam) Nguyễn T N T	11	8
(Chinese Taipei) Chou Y-a (Chinese Taipei) Ko R-h	21	21

Quarter-finals
(Individual Neutral Athletes) A Boiarun (Individual Neutral Athletes) D Kharlampovich	21	19	15
(Chinese Taipei) Chou Y-a (Chinese Taipei) Ko R-h	14	21	21

== Mixed doubles ==
=== Seeds ===
1. (Chinese Taipei) Wu Guan-xun / Lee Chia-hsin (semi-finals)
2. (Thailand) Supak Jomkoh / Ornnicha Jongsathapornparn (first round)
3. (India) Ashith Surya / Amrutha Pramuthesh (second round)
4. (India) Sathwik Reddy Kanapuram / Radhika Sharma (second round)
5. (Indonesia) Rehan Naufal Kusharjanto / Melati Daeva Oktavianti (quarter-finals)
6. (China) Li Hongyi / Huang Kexin (semi-finals)
7. (Thailand) Phuwanat Horbanluekit / Fungfa Korpthammakit (final)
8. (Chinese Taipei) Lu Ming-che / Chou Yun-an (withdrew)

=== Finals ===
Semi-finals
1	(Chinese Taipei) Wu Guan-xun (Chinese Taipei) Lee Chia-hsin	24	16
7	(Thailand) Phuwanat Horbanluekit (Thailand) Fungfa Korpthammakit	26	21
6	(China) Li Hongyi (China) Huang Kexin	18	21	15
(China) Ma Xixiang (China) Qin Huizhi	21	17	21

Final
7	(Thailand) Phuwanat Horbanluekit (Thailand) Fungfa Korpthammakit	22	18	19
(China) Ma Xixiang (China) Qin Huizhi	20	21	21

=== Top half ===
==== Section 1 ====
First round
1	(Chinese Taipei) Wu G-x (Chinese Taipei) Lee C-h	21	21
(Malaysia) Wee Y T (Malaysia) Tan Z H	14	6
(Malaysia) Too M Y (Malaysia) Lee Y S	20	21	21
(Malaysia) Par T A (Venezuela) J Z Gabriela	22	8	11
SWM	(Chinese Taipei) Tsai F-c (Chinese Taipei) Sung Y-h	21	21
(Indonesia) M Al Farizi (Indonesia) J M Rismawardani	11	14
(Malaysia) Tan Z Y (Malaysia) Teoh M X	21	21
(China) Shen XY (China) Tang RZ	11	18

Second round
1	(Chinese Taipei) Wu G-x (Chinese Taipei) Lee C-h	21	21
(Malaysia) Too M Y (Malaysia) Lee Y S	12	14
SWM	(Chinese Taipei) Tsai F-c (Chinese Taipei) Sung Y-h	14	17
(Malaysia) Tan Z Y (Malaysia) Teoh M X	21	21

Quarter-finals
1	(Chinese Taipei) Wu G-x (Chinese Taipei) Lee C-h	21	17	21
(Malaysia) Tan Z Y (Malaysia) Teoh M X	16	21	13

==== Section 2 ====
First round
4	(India) S R Kanapuram (India) R Sharma	21	21
PFQ	(Malaysia) Lee Y B (Malaysia) How Y X	19	14
(Vietnam) Phạm V T (Vietnam) Bùi B P	15	19
(India) V Annadurai (India) S Balaji	21	21
7	(Thailand) P Horbanluekit (Thailand) F Korpthammakit	21	21
(Australia) M Owen (Australia) G Somerville	13	14
Q1	(Malaysia) Goh B Z (Malaysia) D Sofea	21	21
(Germany) C Devereux (Germany) D Töpffer	4	3

Second round
4	(India) S R Kanapuram (India) R Sharma	15	22
(India) V Annadurai (India) S Balaji	21	24
7	(Thailand) P Horbanluekit (Thailand) F Korpthammakit	21	21
Q1	(Malaysia) Goh B Z (Malaysia) D Sofea	15	15

Quarter-finals
(India) V Annadurai (India) S Balaji	12	11
7	(Thailand) P Horbanluekit (Thailand) F Korpthammakit	21	21

=== Bottom half ===
==== Section 3 ====
First round
(Chinese Taipei) Huang J-h (Chinese Taipei) Ko R-h	12	11
(Chinese Taipei) Lu C (Chinese Taipei) Chang Y-j	21	21
(Vietnam) Phạm V H (Vietnam) Thân V A	7	0^{r}
6	(China) Li HY (China) Huang KX	21	0
(Malaysia) Loh Z H (Malaysia) N Tan	21	17	17
(Vietnam) Trần Đ M (Vietnam) Phạm T K	12	21	21
Q2	(Vietnam) Bùi A K (Vietnam) Nguyễn H H	12	14
3	(India) A Surya (India) A Pramuthesh	21	21

Second round
(Chinese Taipei) Lu C (Chinese Taipei) Chang Y-j	8	8
6	(China) Li HY (China) Huang KX	21	21
(Vietnam) Trần Ð M (Vietnam) Phạm T K	21	19	21
3	(India) A Surya (India) A Pramuthesh	15	21	14

Quarter-finals
6	(China) Li HY (China) Huang KX	21	21
(Vietnam) Trần Ð M (Vietnam) Phạm T K	9	9

==== Section 4 ====
First round
Q4	(Thailand) R Makkasasithorn (Thailand) P Srisawat	22	21
PFQ	(Thailand) E Kitkawinroj (Thailand) P Chaiwanna	20	17
Q3	(Thailand) T Setthaprasert (Thailand) P Rungruengpramong	18	13
5	(Indonesia) R N Kusharjanto (Indonesia) M D Oktavianti	21	21
PFQ	(Chinese Taipei) Huang T-i (Chinese Taipei) Wang Y-z	9	13
(China) Ma XX (China) Qin HZ	21	21
(China) Liao PY (China) Zhang JH	9	21	27
2	(Thailand) S Jomkoh (Thailand) O Jongsathapornparn	21	14	25

Second round
Q4	(Thailand) R Makkasasithorn (Thailand) P Srisawat	16	11
5	(Indonesia) R N Kusharjanto (Indonesia) M D Oktavianti	21	21
(China) Ma XX (China) Qin HZ	21	21
(China) Liao PY (China) Zhang JH	13	16

Quarter-finals
5	(Indonesia) R N Kusharjanto (Indonesia) M D Oktavianti	19	17
(China) Ma XX (China) Qin HZ	21	21

Preceded by 2026 China Masters; 2026 Indonesia Masters Super 100 I	BWF World Tour; 2026 BWF season	Succeeded by 2026 Arctic Open
