= 2024 BWF World Junior Championships – Girls' singles =

Tournament details
- Dates: 7 October 2024 – 13 October 2024
- Edition: 24th
- Level: International
- Venue: Nanchang International Sports Center
- Location: Nanchang, China

The girls' singles of the tournament 2024 BWF World Junior Championships was an individual badminton tournament to crowned the best girls' singles under 19 player across the BWF associate members around the world. Players will compete to win the Eye Level Cup presented by the former BWF President and chairman of the World Youth Culture Foundation, Kang Young Joong. The tournament was held from 7 to 13 October 2024 in Nanchang International Sports Center, Nanchang, Jiangxi, China. The defending champion was Pitchamon Opatniputh from Thailand. Competing as second seed, Opatniputh was upset by Yin Yiqing of China in the fourth round.

== Seeds ==
1. (Thailand) Sarunrak Vitidsarn (semi-finals)
2. (Thailand) Pitchamon Opatniputh (fourth round)
3. (China) Xu Wenjing (champion)
4. (Bulgaria) Kaloyana Nalbantova (second round)
5. (Thailand) Anyapat Phichitpreechasak (third round)
6. (Indonesia) Mutiara Ayu Puspitasari (third round)
7. (France) Malya Hoareau (second round)
8. (United Arab Emirates) Mysha Omer Khan (second round)

9. (Thailand) Yataweemin Ketklieng (third round)
10. (Czech Republic) Lucie Krulová (fourth round)
11. (India) Navya Kanderi (third round)
12. (Chinese Taipei) Wang Pei-yu (quarter-finals)
13. (Chinese Taipei) Lee Pin-yi (second round)
14. (China) Yin Yiqing (final)
15. (Switzerland) Leila Zarrouk (second round)
16. (Malaysia) Eng Ler Qi (first round)

== Draw ==
=== Finals ===
Quarter-finals
1	(Thailand) Sarunrak Vitidsarn	21	15	21
(China) Yuan Anqi	17	21	11
3	(China) Xu Wenjing	21	19	21
(India) Tanvi Sharma	13	21	15
(India) Aalisha Naik	18	19
(China) Dai Qinyi	21	21
12	(Chinese Taipei) Wang Pei-yu	15	15
14	(China) Yin Yiqing	21	21

Semi-finals
1	(Thailand) Sarunrak Vitidsarn	12	22
3	(China) Xu Wenjing	21	24
(China) Dai Qinyi	16	21	21
14	(China) Yin Yiqing	21	17	23

Final
3	(China) Xu Wenjing	19	23	21
14	(China) Yin Yiqing	21	21	11

=== Top half ===
==== Section 1 ====
First round
(Armenia) L Smbatyan	20	14
(Estonia) E Shapovalova	22	21
(Latvia) E Freija	17	9
(Cook Islands) T P Tupa	21	21
(Norway) S Bjørnestøl	13	5
(Poland) A Syrek	21	21
(Armenia) E Hovhannisyan	21	16	20
(Latvia) A Priedniece	16	21	22
(Northern Mariana Islands) L Tsukagoshi	7	10
(United Arab Emirates) S Kurbkhelgi	21	21
(Azerbaijan) H Nuriyeva	21	21
(Mongolia) G Enkhjin	5	7

Second round
1	(Thailand) S Vitidsarn	21	21
(Estonia) E Shapovalova	7	6
(Cook Islands) T P Tupa	9	4
(Poland) A Syrek	21	21
10	(Czech Republic) L Krulová	21	21
(Latvia) A Priedniece	9	6
(United Arab Emirates) S Kurbkhelgi	21	21
(Azerbaijan) H Nuriyeva	10	11

Third round
1	(Thailand) S Vitidsarn	21	21
(Poland) A Syrek	4	15
10	(Czech Republic) L Krulová	21	21
(United Arab Emirates) S Kurbkhelgi	10	16

Fourth round
1	(Thailand) S Vitidsarn	21	21
10	(Czech Republic) L Krulová	11	15

==== Section 2 ====
First round
(Slovenia) A Blazina	21	21
(Uganda) O B Kyomukama	4	7
(Indonesia) K N Aulia	21	21
(Cook Islands) L Toa	1	9
(Canada) M Tian	19	16
(Poland) K Ziółkowska	21	21
9	(Thailand) Y Ketklieng	21	21
(Vietnam) Nguyễn T T H	7	15
(Portugal) M Avelino	11	12
(Macau) Chan H W	21	21
(Portugal) E Glória	26	18	10
(Philippines) K M Agura	24	21	21
(Estonia) R Vakk	3	6
(China) Yuan AQ	21	21

Second round
7	(France) M Hoareau	13	21	15
(Slovenia) A Blazina	21	15	21
(Indonesia) K N Aulia	20	21	21
(Poland) K Ziółkowska	22	15	8
9	(Thailand) Y Ketklieng	21	21
(Macau) Chan H W	4	8
(Philippines) K M Agura	5	4
(China) Yuan AQ	21	21

Third round
(Slovenia) A Blazina	15	17
(Indonesia) K N Aulia	21	21
9	(Thailand) Y Ketklieng	13	25	10
(China) Yuan AQ	21	23	21

Fourth round
(Indonesia) K N Aulia	8	6
(China) Yuan AQ	21	21

==== Section 3 ====
First round
(Chinese Taipei) Huang S-c	21	21
(Mauritius) E How Hong	11	7
(Indonesia) N K D A Pratiwi	21	21
(New Zealand) YX Liu	7	4
(Mongolia) T-O Enkhlen	3	3
(Romania) D-M Muscalu	21	21
16	(Malaysia) Eng L Q	16	10
(Hong Kong) Wong Y	21	21
(Vietnam) Bùi B P	21	21
(Australia) S Tjonadi	5	12
(Sri Lanka) R Liyanage	16	21	21
(India) V Kalagotla	21	12	15
(Slovakia) J Ivanovičová	16	13
(United States) V Yang	21	21

Second round
3	(China) Xu WJ	21	21
(Chinese Taipei) Huang S-c	10	17
(Indonesia) N K D A Pratiwi	21	21
(Romania) D-M Muscalu	4	6
(Hong Kong) Wong Y	18	12
(Vietnam) Bùi B P	21	21
(Sri Lanka) R Liyanage	21	21
(United States) V Yang	14	16

Third round
3	(China) Xu WJ	21	21
(Indonesia) N K D A Pratiwi	10	14
(Vietnam) Bùi B P	13	21	16
(Sri Lanka) R Liyanage	21	12	21

Fourth round
3	(China) Xu WJ	22	21
(Sri Lanka) R Liyanage	20	13

==== Section 4 ====
First round
(Singapore) Chia X Y	21	21
(Philippines) C R Fuentespina	15	16
(Slovenia) T Horvat	6	13
(Japan) N Matsuta	21	21
(Peru) N Junco	21	21
(Mauritius) M Siow Yin Young	8	12
13	(Chinese Taipei) Lee P-y	21	21
(Northern Mariana Islands) R Bautista	5	3
(India) T Sharma	21	21
(Hong Kong) Lee H L	11	9
(Japan) N Shirakawa	w	/	o
(Ghana) R Quarcoo
(Turkey) R Bodur	21	21
(Netherlands) I Pothuizen	15	15

Second round
6	(Indonesia) M A Puspitasari	21	21
(Singapore) Chia X Y	15	15
(Japan) N Matsuta	21	21
(Peru) N Junco	6	7
13	(Chinese Taipei) Lee P-y	9	9
(India) T Sharma	21	21
(Japan) N Shirakawa	21	21
(Turkey) R Bodur	6	10

Third round
6	(Indonesia) M A Puspitasari	10	19
(Japan) N Matsuta	21	21
(India) T Sharma	21	8	22
(Japan) N Shirakawa	19	21	20

Fourth round
(Japan) N Matsuta	18	13
(India) T Sharma	21	21

=== Bottom half ===
==== Section 5 ====
First round
(Netherlands) F Wang	21	21
(Peru) R Castañeda	18	14
(India) A Naik	21	21
(Azerbaijan) Y Guliyeva	4	4
(Slovenia) A Korent	13	16
(England) R Parab	21	21
(Uganda) N Nakiyemba	4	6
15	(Switzerland) L Zarrouk	21	21
(Germany) G Poluektov	21	21
(Slovakia) K Goldiánová	6	15
(Poland) K Stokfisz	14	21	21
(Norway) L Holmedal	21	16	14
(Malaysia) Lim Z S	21	21
(Norway) M Korssund	8	9

Second round
(Netherlands) F Wang	11	16
(India) A Naik	21	21
(England) R Parab	14	21	21
15	(Switzerland) L Zarrouk	21	15	13
(Germany) G Poluektov	21	21
(Poland) K Stokfisz	17	16
(Malaysia) Lim Z S	21	21
8	(United Arab Emirates) M O Khan	18	14

Third round
(India) A Naik	21	21
(England) R Parab	18	14
(Germany) G Poluektov	8	13
(Malaysia) Lim Z S	21	21

Fourth round
(India) A Naik	21	21
(Malaysia) Lim Z S	17	17

==== Section 6 ====
First round
(Peru) T Kasianov	21	21
(Netherlands) M Duijndam	16	15
(China) Dai QY	21	21
(Trinidad and Tobago) S Karim	4	6
(Malaysia) Oo S Z	21	21
(Canada) S Huang	14	8
(Australia) V Tjonadi	8	19
11	(India) N Kanderi	21	21
(Philippines) A D Ocampo	19	13
(Hong Kong) Liu H K	21	21
(Japan) M Yokouchi	21	21
(Slovakia) L Kyselicová	3	8
(United States) E Lin	21	15	21
(Japan) M Anami	19	21	13

Second round
(Peru) T Kasianov	3	13
(China) Dai QY	21	21
(Malaysia) Oo S Z	24	21	16
11	(India) N Kanderi	26	15	21
(Hong Kong) Liu H K	20	17
(Japan) M Yokouchi	22	21
(United States) E Lin	24	21
4	(Bulgaria) K Nalbantova	22	17

Third round
(China) Dai QY	20	21	21
11	(India) N Kanderi	22	13	14
(Japan) M Yokouchi	18	21	21
(United States) E Lin	21	9	18

Fourth round
(China) Dai QY	21	21
(Japan) M Yokouchi	15	9

==== Section 7 ====
First round
(Indonesia) S D Ramadhani	w	/	o
(Ghana) M Adu
(Mauritius) C How Hong	16	18
(Portugal) M Wilkinson	21	21
(Uganda) R Bukenya	15	14
(New Zealand) M Xu	21	21
(Wales) I Mekala	8	10
12	(Chinese Taipei) Wang P-y	21	21
(Northern Mariana Islands) G Lansangan	3	2
(Sri Lanka) R Mudalige	21	21
(Sri Lanka) S Ranasinghe	16	6
(Malaysia) Ong X Y	21	21
(United Arab Emirates) T Karthikeyan	12	17
(Turkey) A Korkut	21	21

Second round
(Indonesia) S D Ramadhani	21	21
(Portugal) M Wilkinson	3	11
(New Zealand) M Xu	5	2
12	(Chinese Taipei) Wang P-y	21	21
(Sri Lanka) R Mudalige	11	12
(Malaysia) Ong X Y	21	21
(Turkey) A Korkut	10	13
5	(Thailand) A Phichitpreechasak	21	21

Third round
(Indonesia) S D Ramadhani	18	17
12	(Chinese Taipei) Wang P-y	21	21
(Malaysia) Ong X Y	21	21
5	(Thailand) A Phichitpreechasak	16	16

Fourth round
12	(Chinese Taipei) Wang P-y	21	14	21
(Malaysia) Ong X Y	10	21	16

==== Section 8 ====
First round
(United States) N Krawczyk	21	23
(New Zealand) J Zhao	6	21
(Vietnam) Trần T Á	21	21
(Azerbaijan) L Jamalzade	8	6
(Estonia) M Paskotši	14	19
(Singapore) M Tan	21	21
(Macau) Ieong S K	18	13
(Denmark) K van Dalm	21	21
(Canada) E Meng	21	21
(Latvia) N Mukiele	5	11
(Singapore) A Zakaria	21	21
(Mongolia) D Nandin-Erdene	4	4

Second round
(United States) N Krawczyk	20	18
(Vietnam) Trần T Á	22	21
(Singapore) M Tan	4	7
14	(China) Yin YQ	21	21
(Denmark) K van Dalm	15	12
(Canada) E Meng	21	21
(Singapore) A Zakaria	10	11
2	(Thailand) P Opatniputh	21	21

Third round
(Vietnam) Trần T Á	9	14
14	(China) Yin YQ	21	21
(Canada) E Meng	10	21	9
2	(Thailand) P Opatniputh	21	18	21

Fourth round
14	(China) Yin YQ	21	18	21
2	(Thailand) P Opatniputh	13	21	18
