= 2025 BWF World Junior Championships – girls' singles =

Badminton championships

Girls' singles at the 2025 BWF World Junior Championships
- Venue: National Centre of Excellence
- Location: Guwahati, Assam, India
- Dates: 13–19 October

Medalists
gold medal	Anyapat Phichitpreechasak	Thailand
silver medal	Tanvi Sharma	India
bronze medal	Liu Siya	China
bronze medal	Yataweemin Keklieng	Thailand

The girls' singles event at the 2025 BWF World Junior Championships was an individual badminton tournament to crown the best under-19 girls' singles player among BWF member associations. The winner received the Eye Level Cup, presented by former BWF President and chairman of the World Youth Culture Foundation, Kang Young Joong. The tournament was held from 13 to 19 October 2025 at the National Centre of Excellence in Guwahati, Assam, India. Xu Wenjing of China was the defending champion.

== Seeds ==
The seeds are determined based on the BWF World Junior Rankings released on 23 September 2025.

1. (India) Tanvi Sharma (final)
2. (Thailand) Anyapat Phichitpreechasak (champion)
3. (China) Xu Wenjing (third round)
4. (Sri Lanka) Ranithma Liyanage (quarter-finals)
5. (Thailand) Tonrug Saeheng (fourth round)
6. (Thailand) Yataweemin Ketklieng (semi-finals)
7. (Indonesia) Thalita Ramadhani Wiryawan (second round)
8. (India) Unnati Hooda (quarter-finals)

9. (Chinese Taipei) Liao Jui-chi (third round)
10. (India) Rakshitha Ramraj (fourth round)
11. (United Arab Emirates) Mysha Omer Khan (second round)
12. (Chinese Taipei) Su Xiao-ting (fourth round)
13. (Malaysia) Lim Zhi Shin (third round)
14. (United Arab Emirates) Prakriti Bharath (third round)
15. (Slovenia) Anja Blazina (second round)
16. (France) Margaux Lasis (second round)

== Draw ==
=== Finals ===
Quarter-finals
1	(India) Tanvi Sharma	13	15	15
(Japan) Saki Matsumoto	15	9	10
4	(Sri Lanka) Ranithma Liyanage	9	6
(China) Liu Siya	15	15
6	(Thailand) Yataweemin Keklieng	15	15
(Japan) Yuzuno Watanabe	3	12
8	(India) Unnati Hooda	12	13
2	(Thailand) Anyapat Phichitpreechasak	15	15

Semi-finals
1	(India) Tanvi Sharma	15	15
(China) Liu Siya	11	9
6	(Thailand) Yataweemin Keklieng	15	11	5
2	(Thailand) Anyapat Phichitpreechasak	10	15	15

Final
1	(India) Tanvi Sharma	7	12
2	(Thailand) Anyapat Phichitpreechasak	15	15

=== Top half ===
==== Section 1 ====
First round
(Uganda) M Maliha	6	5
(Poland) W Kaletka	15	15
(Indonesia) O L J S Winarto	15	10	17
(Vietnam) Nguyễn T T H	7	15	15
(Japan) N Shirakawa	15	15
(Peru) T Kasianov	7	6
(China) Sun LY	15	15
(Ghana) M Adu	4	9
(Netherlands) F Wang	15	15
(Romania) D-I Gherasim	8	10

Second round
1	(India) T Sharma	15	15
(Poland) W Kaletka	2	1
(Portugal) M Sousa	7	3
(Indonesia) O L J S Winarto	15	15
9	(Chinese Taipei) Liao J-c	15	15
(Japan) N Shirakawa	12	7
(China) Sun LY	15	15
(Netherlands) F Wang	8	8

Third round
1	(India) T Sharma	15	15
(Indonesia) O L J S Winarto	12	7
9	(Chinese Taipei) Liao J-c	12	12
(China) Sun LY	15	15

Fourth round
1	(India) T Sharma	15	15
(China) Sun LY	8	5

==== Section 2 ====
First round
(France) L Laurent	7	15
(Chinese Taipei) Wen S-y	15	17
(South Korea) Kim B-h	13	15	12
(Indonesia) W A Sabrina	15	8	15
(United States) A Chang	5	12
(Chinese Taipei) Liao Y-c	15	15
(Germany) K Nilges	15	15
(Hungary) Z Szabo	7	7
(Uganda) V Nalule	3	4
(United Arab Emirates) S Kurbkhelgi	15	15
(Norway) L Holmedal	5	7
(Japan) S Matsumoto	15	15

Second round
7	(Indonesia) T R Wiryawan	15	7	8
(Chinese Taipei) Wen S-y	12	15	15
(Indonesia) W A Sabrina	7	15	13
(Chinese Taipei) Liao Y-c	15	12	15
14	(United Arab Emirates) P Bharath	16	8
(Germany) K Nilges	14	7^{r}
(United Arab Emirates) S Kurbkhelgi	9	9
(Japan) S Matsumoto	15	15

Third round
(Chinese Taipei) Wen S-y	7	7
(Chinese Taipei) Liao Y-c	15	15
14	(United Arab Emirates) P Bharath	11	15	13
(Japan) S Matsumoto	15	8	15

Fourth round
(Chinese Taipei) Liao Y-c	11	14
(Japan) S Matsumoto	15	16

==== Section 3 ====
First round
(Hong Kong) Ip S Y	15	15
(Australia) F Huo	9	9
(Malaysia) Eng L Q	15	15
(England) A Bhatia	1	5
(Poland) O Szwarnowiecka	8	9
(Canada) L Yang	15	15
(Wales) I Mekala	10	15	7
(Singapore) A Zakaria	15	9	15
(Slovenia) T Horvat	10	12
(Philippines) R Quierez	15	15

Second round
4	(Sri Lanka) R Liyanage	15	15
(Hong Kong) Ip S Y	6	10
(Canada) F Zhang	7	10
(Malaysia) Eng L Q	15	15
10	(India) R Ramraj	15	15
(Canada) L Yang	5	9
(Singapore) A Zakaria	15	15
(Philippines) R Quierez	6	7

Third round
4	(Sri Lanka) R Liyanage	15	15
(Malaysia) Eng L Q	9	12
10	(India) R Ramraj	11	15	15
(Singapore) A Zakaria	15	5	8

Fourth round
4	(Sri Lanka) R Liyanage	15	15
10	(India) R Ramraj	11	9

==== Section 4 ====
First round
(Republic of Ireland) S Flynn	1	6
(India) V Kalagotla	15	15
(Denmark) C Mouritsen	15	15
(Egypt) A Elghandour	8	7
(Philippines) E Bejasa	15	15
(Slovakia) L Kyselicová	10	7
(Turkey) A Korkut	15	15
(Brazil) J Murosaki	5	10
(China) Liu SY	15	15
(Japan) Y Nagafuchi	10	12
(Nepal) R Sherchan	15	15
(Bhutan) K Gurung	9	8

Second round
5	(Thailand) T Saeheng	15	15
(India) V Kalagotla	6	5
(Denmark) C Mouritsen	13	15	15
(Philippines) E Bejasa	15	10	12
13	(Malaysia) Lim Z S	15	15
(Turkey) A Korkut	6	10
(China) Liu SY	15	15
(Nepal) R Sherchan	3	4

Third round
5	(Thailand) T Saeheng	15	15
(Denmark) C Mouritsen	6	4
13	(Malaysia) Lim Z S	10	14
(China) Liu SY	15	16

Fourth round
5	(Thailand) T Saeheng	15	10	7
(China) Liu SY	13	15	15

=== Bottom half ===
==== Section 5 ====
First round
(Hungary) A Pinke	5	6
(Peru) N Junco Vasquez	15	15
(Egypt) F Rabie	15	15
(Slovakia) E Sarena	11	12
(Netherlands) M Duijndam	6	14
(South Korea) Kim T-y	15	16
(Republic of Ireland) N Joy	9	6
(United States) M H Cruz	15	15
(Egypt) M Mohamed	8	10
(Sri Lanka) D Karunaratna	15	15
(South Korea) Lee S-y	15	15
(Vietnam) Nguyễn V N T	9	1

Second round
(Peru) N Junco Vasquez	13	9
(Egypt) F Rabie	15	15
(South Korea) Kim T-y	9	7
12	(Chinese Taipei) Su X-t	15	15
(United States) M H Cruz	15	15
(Sri Lanka) D Karunaratna	5	3
(South Korea) Lee S-y	8	4
6	(Thailand) Y Ketklieng	15	15

Third round
(Egypt) F Rabie	4	7
12	(Chinese Taipei) Su X-t	15	15
(United States) M H Cruz	6	10
6	(Thailand) Y Ketklieng	15	15

Fourth round
12	(Chinese Taipei) Su X-t	15	11	14
6	(Thailand) Y Ketklieng	12	15	16

==== Section 6 ====
First round
(England) R Parab	21	4	15
(Philippines) C R Fuentespina	20	15	8
(Ghana) R Quarcoo	9	5
(Indonesia) S Amiradana	15	15
(Romania) D-M Muscalu	11	7
(Malaysia) Oo S Z	15	15
(Japan) Y Watanabe	15	15
(Nepal) N Shrestha	1	0
(Denmark) I Nissen	8	15	15
(Turkey) E Demir	15	12	10

Second round
(England) R Parab	7	9
(Indonesia) S Amiradana	15	15
(Malaysia) Oo S Z	15	15
11	(United Arab Emirates) M O Khan	8	9
(Japan) Y Watanabe	15	15
(Portugal) M Avelino	4	5
(Denmark) I Nissen	6	6
3	(China) Xu WJ	15	15

Third round
(Indonesia) S Amiradana	8	11
(Malaysia) Oo S Z	15	15
(Japan) Y Watanabe	15	11	15
3	(China) Xu WJ	12	15	10

Fourth round
(Malaysia) Oo S Z	11	12
(Japan) Y Watanabe	15	15

==== Section 7 ====
First round
(Canada) Y Jian	4	5
(Denmark) M Viscovich	15	15
(Germany) G Poluektov	15	15
(Uganda) K Ndagire	4	0
(Malaysia) C Tee	15	15
(Slovakia) E Eliaskova	8	9
(United States) A Wang	15	15
(Bhutan) Y Dolkar	6	6
(Sri Lanka) B J Vidyathilaka	15	15
(Nepal) D Rana	10	9
(Brazil) L Andres	6	9
(Hong Kong) Liu H K A	15	15

Second round
(Denmark) M Viscovich	w	/	o
(Germany) G Poluektov
(Malaysia) C Tee	15	15
15	(Slovenia) A Blazina	7	10
(United States) A Wang	15	15
(Sri Lanka) B J Vidyathilaka	5	7
(Hong Kong) Liu H K A	8	9
8	(India) U Hooda	15	15

Third round
(Denmark) M Viscovich	8	11
(Malaysia) C Tee	15	15
(United States) A Wang	8	5
8	(India) U Hooda	15	15

Fourth round
(Malaysia) C Tee	10	7
8	(India) U Hooda	15	15

==== Section 8 ====
First round
(Vietnam) Bùi B P	8	15	15
(United States) A Meng	15	11	12
(Bhutan) T Chokey	3	2
(Poland) K Ziolkowska	15	15
(Denmark) A L Thornild	15	12	11
(Australia) J Carrisia	12	15	15
(Hong Kong) Wong Y	15	15
(Republic of Ireland) M Shochan	10	12
(Australia) V Tjonadi	15	15
(Norway) O L Risa	8	11

Second round
(Vietnam) Bùi B P	15	12
(Poland) K Ziolkowska	8	6^{r}
(Australia) J Carrisia	17	18
16	(France) M Lasis	15	16
(Hong Kong) Wong Y	15	15
(Norway) M Ellingsen	1	5
(Australia) V Tjonadi	6	3
2	(Thailand) A Phichitpreechasak	15	15

Third round
(Vietnam) Bùi B P	9	15	15
(Australia) J Carrisia	15	6	9
(Hong Kong) Wong Y	11	11
2	(Thailand) A Phichitpreechasak	15	15

Fourth round
(Vietnam) Bùi B P	11	9
2	(Thailand) A Phichitpreechasak	15	15
