= Tanvi Sharma =

Indian badminton player (born 2008)

Personal information
- Born: 22 December 2008 (age 17) Hoshiarpur, Punjab, India
- Years active: 2022–present
- Height: 1.64 m (5 ft 5 in)

Sport
- Country: India
- Sport: Badminton
- Handedness: Right
- Coached by: Park Tae-sang

Women's singles
- Highest ranking: 21 (20 October 2026)
- Current ranking: 21 (3 November 2026)
- BWF profile
Medal record
Women's badminton
Representing India
Asian Team Championships
Gold medal – first place	2024 Selangor	Women's team
World Junior Championships
Silver medal – second place	2025 Guwahati	Girls' singles
Bronze medal – third place	2025 Guwahati	Mixed team
Asian Junior Championships
Bronze medal – third place	2025 Surakarta	Girls' singles

Tanvi Sharma (born 22 December 2008) is an Indian badminton player. She is the first Indian to win more than one medal in an edition of the World Junior Championships, with a silver in the girls' singles and bronze in the mixed team event at the 2025 edition. She was a part of the team that won gold at the 2024 Asian Team Championships.

== Early life ==
Sharma was born in Hoshiarpur, Punjab. She was introduced to badminton at an early age by her mother Meena Sharma who played volleyball at the DC Complex. Tanvi joined the Gopichand Academy in 2016, where she trained as a non-scholarship trainee for five years until 2021.

== Achievements ==
=== World Junior Championships ===
Girls' singles
Year	Venue	Opponent	Score	Result	Ref.
2025	National Centre of Excellence; Guwahati, India	(Thailand) Anyapat Phichitpreechasak	7–15, 12–15	Silver	

=== Asian Junior Championships ===
Girls' singles
Year	Venue	Opponent	Score	Result	Ref.
2025	Manahan Indoor Sports Hall; Surakarta, Indonesia	(China) Yin Yiqing	13–21, 14–21	Bronze	

=== BWF World Tour (1 title, 3 runners-up) ===
The World Tour was announced in 2017 and implemented in 2018. It is a series of elite badminton tournaments sanctioned by the Badminton World Federation. The tour is divided into levels of Super 1000, Super 750, Super 500, Super 300, and Super 100.

Year	Tournament	Level	Opponent	Score	Result
2024	Odisha Masters	Super 100	(China) Cai Yanyan	14–21, 16–21	(silver) Runner-up
2025	U.S. Open	Super 300	(United States) Beiwen Zhang	11–21, 21–16, 10–21	(silver) Runner-up
2025	Guwahati Masters	Super 100	(Chinese Taipei) Tung Ciou-tong	18–21, 18–21	(silver) Runner-up
2026	Taipei Open	Super 300	(Vietnam) Nguyễn Thùy Linh	21–16, 21–16	(gold) Winner

=== International Challenge / Series (2 titles) ===
Year	Tournament	Opponent	Score	Result
2024	Bonn International	(Chinese Taipei) Wang Pei-yu	21–19, 22–20	(gold) Winner
2025	Denmark Challenge	(Indonesia) Ni Kadek Dhinda Amartya Pratiwi	21–13, 21–10	(gold) Winner

BWF International Challenge tournament
BWF International Series tournament
BWF Future Series tournament

=== Junior International (1 title, 1 runner-up) ===
Girls' singles
Year	Tournament	Opponent	Score	Result
2023	India Junior International	(India) Navya Kanderi	20–22, 21–18, 21–13	(gold) Winner

Girls' doubles
Year	Tournament	Partner	Opponent	Score	Result
2022	India Junior International	(India) Radhika Sharma	(Malaysia) Ong Xin Yee (Malaysia) Carmen Ting	16–21, 15–21	(silver) Runner-up

BWF Junior International Grand Prix tournament
BWF Junior International Challenge tournament
BWF Junior International Series tournament
BWF Junior Future Series tournament

== Performance timeline ==
Key

W	Won	F	Finalist	SF	Semi-finalist
QF	Quarter-finalist	#R	Rounds 4, 3, 2, 1	RR	Round-robin stage
Q#	Qualification round	A	Absent	w/d	Withdrew
G	Gold	S	Silver	B	Bronze
NH	Not held	N/A	Not applicable	DNQ	Did not qualify

=== Tournaments ===
Senior events

Event	2024	2025	2026	Ref
Individual
Olympic Games	A	NH		
World Championships	NH	A		
Asian Championships	A		1R	
Team
Uber Cup	QF	NH	RR	
Sudirman Cup	NH	A	NH	
Asian Games	NH		QF	
Asian Championships	G	NH	7th	
Asian Mixed Championships	NH	A	NH	

Junior events

Event	2024	2025	Ref
Individual
World Championships	QF	S	
Asian Championships	3R	B	
Team
World Championships	6th	B	
Asian Championships	6th	6th	

=== BWF World Tour ===
Tournament	World Tour			Best	Ref
Tournament	2024	2025	2026	Best	Ref
India Open	A		1R	1R ('26)	
Indonesia Masters	A		1R	1R ('26)	
German Open	A		1R	1R ('26)	
Swiss Open	A		1R	1R ('26)	
Orléans Masters	A		SF	SF ('26)	
Thailand Open	A		1R	1R ('26)	
Malaysia Masters	A		1R	1R ('26)	
Australian Open	A		QF	QF ('26)	
U.S. Open	A	F	QF	F ('25)	
Taipei Open	A		W	W ('26)	
Korea Masters	A		QF	QF ('26)	
China Masters	A		2R	2R ('26)	
Indonesia Masters Super 100	2R	A		2R ('24)	
Vietnam Open	A	QF	SF	SF ('26)	
Denmark Open	A		QF	QF ('26)	
French Open	A		2R	2R ('26)	
Korea Open	A		2R	2R ('26)	
Syed Modi International	1R	SF		SF ('25)	
Guwahati Masters	QF	F		F ('25)	
Odisha Masters	F	QF		F ('24)	
Year-end ranking	100	42		21	

== Record against opponents ==
Record against Year-end Finals finalists, World Championships semi-finalists, and Olympic quarter-finalists. Accurate as of 6 December 2025.

Player	Matches	Win	Lost	Diff.
(China) Wang Zhiyi	2	0	2	–2
(Indonesia) Putri Kusuma Wardani	1	0	1	–1
(Japan) Nozomi Okuhara	1	1	0	+1
(Japan) Akane Yamaguchi	1	0	1	–1
(South Korea) An Se-young	2	0	2	–2
(Thailand) Ratchanok Intanon	1	0	1	–1

== See also ==
- Badminton in India
- India national badminton team
- List of Indian sportswomen
