= Terry Hee =

Singaporean badminton player (born 1995)

Terry Hee 許永凱
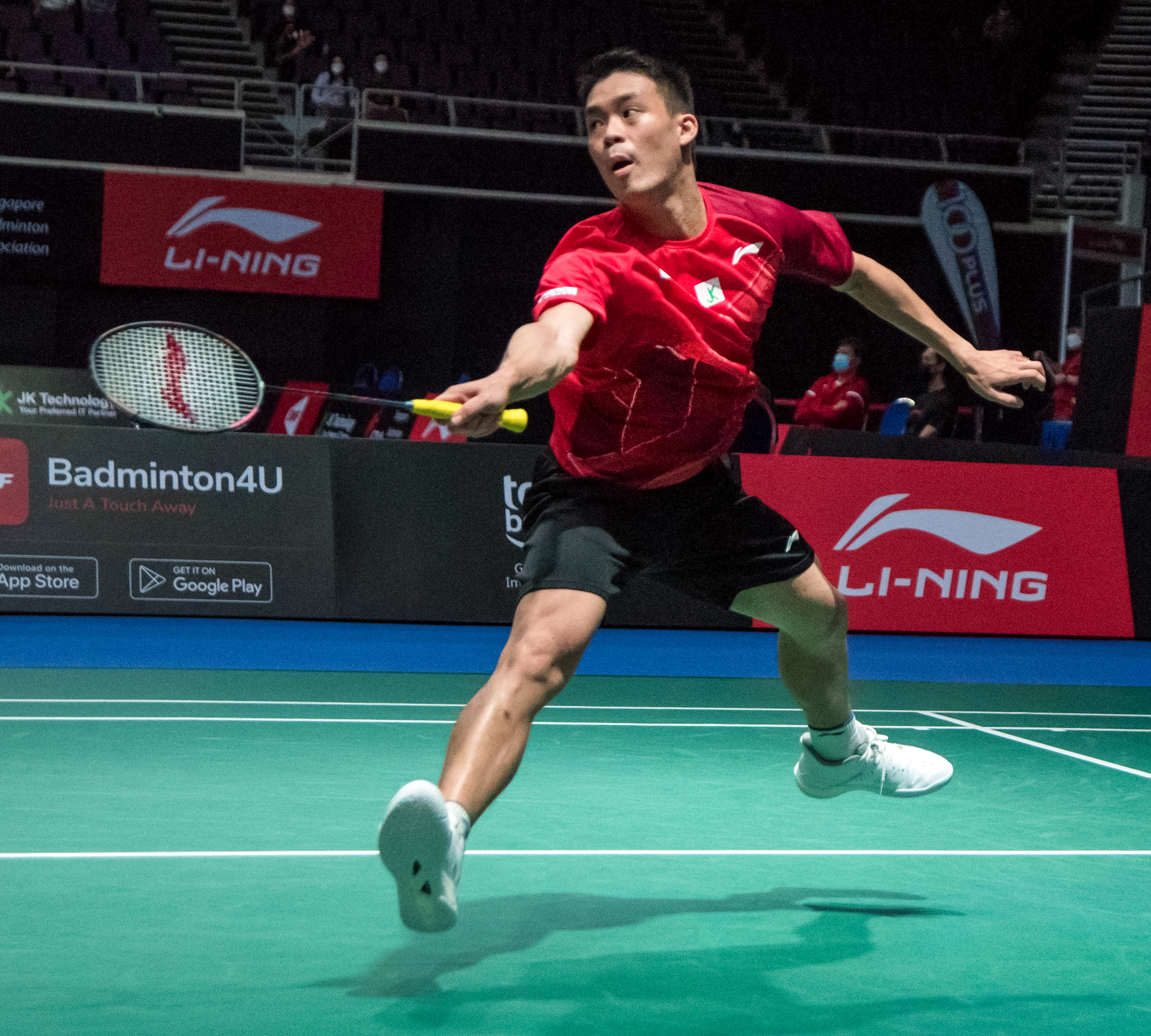
- Hee at the 2022 Singapore Open

Personal information
- Full name: Terry Hee Yong Kai
- Born: 6 July 1995 (age 31) Singapore
- Years active: 2014–present
- Height: 1.70 m (5 ft 7 in)
- Weight: 65 kg (143 lb)

Sport
- Country: Singapore
- Sport: Badminton
- Handedness: Right

Men's & mixed doubles
- Highest ranking: 22 (MD with Loh Kean Hean, 27 December 2022); 13 (XD with Jessica Tan, 3 January 2023)
- Current ranking: 49 (XD with Jin Yujia, 5 May 2026)
- BWF profile
Medal record
Men's badminton
Representing Singapore
Commonwealth Games
Gold medal – first place	2022 Birmingham	Mixed doubles
Bronze medal – third place	2014 Glasgow	Mixed team
Bronze medal – third place	2022 Birmingham	Mixed team
Asia Team Championships
Bronze medal – third place	2022 Selangor	Men's team
SEA Games
Bronze medal – third place	2015 Singapore	Men's team
Bronze medal – third place	2017 Kuala Lumpur	Men's team
Bronze medal – third place	2019 Philippines	Men's team
Bronze medal – third place	2021 Vietnam	Men's doubles
Bronze medal – third place	2021 Vietnam	Men's team
Bronze medal – third place	2023 Cambodia	Men's team
Bronze medal – third place	2025 Thailand	Men's team

Terry Hee Yong Kai (Note: Chinese: 許永凱; pinyin: Xǔ Yǒngkǎi.; In this Chinese name, the family name is Hee. In accordance with custom, the Western-style name is Terry Hee and the Chinese-style name is Hee Yong Kai.) (born 6 July 1995) is a Singaporean badminton player. In mixed doubles with Jessica Tan, Hee won his first World Tour title at the 2022 India Open. Hee together with Jessica Tan also won the gold medal in the mixed doubles event at the 2022 Commonwealth Games, a first for Singapore in that discipline at the Games. Hee and his wife, Jessica Tan, were nominated for the Straits Times Singaporean of the Year Award 2022. Terry Hee and Jessica Tan are Singapore's first local-born mixed doubles duo to qualify for the Olympics, and made their debut at the Paris Olympics 2024.

== Early life ==
Hee was born in Penang and enrolled in the Singapore Sports School on a scholarship when he was 13. He began playing badminton professionally for Singapore in 2014, after going through the youth system at the Singapore Sports School (SBA)'s badminton academy.

== Career ==
=== 2014–2018: Early senior career ===
Hee won the mixed team bronze medal at the 2014 Commonwealth Games in Glasgow, Scotland. He was also part of the national team that won the men's team bronze medals at the 2015, 2017, 2019, 2021, and the 2023 SEA Games. He made his second appearance at the Commonwealth Games in Gold Coast 2018.

=== 2022: Commonwealth Games success ===
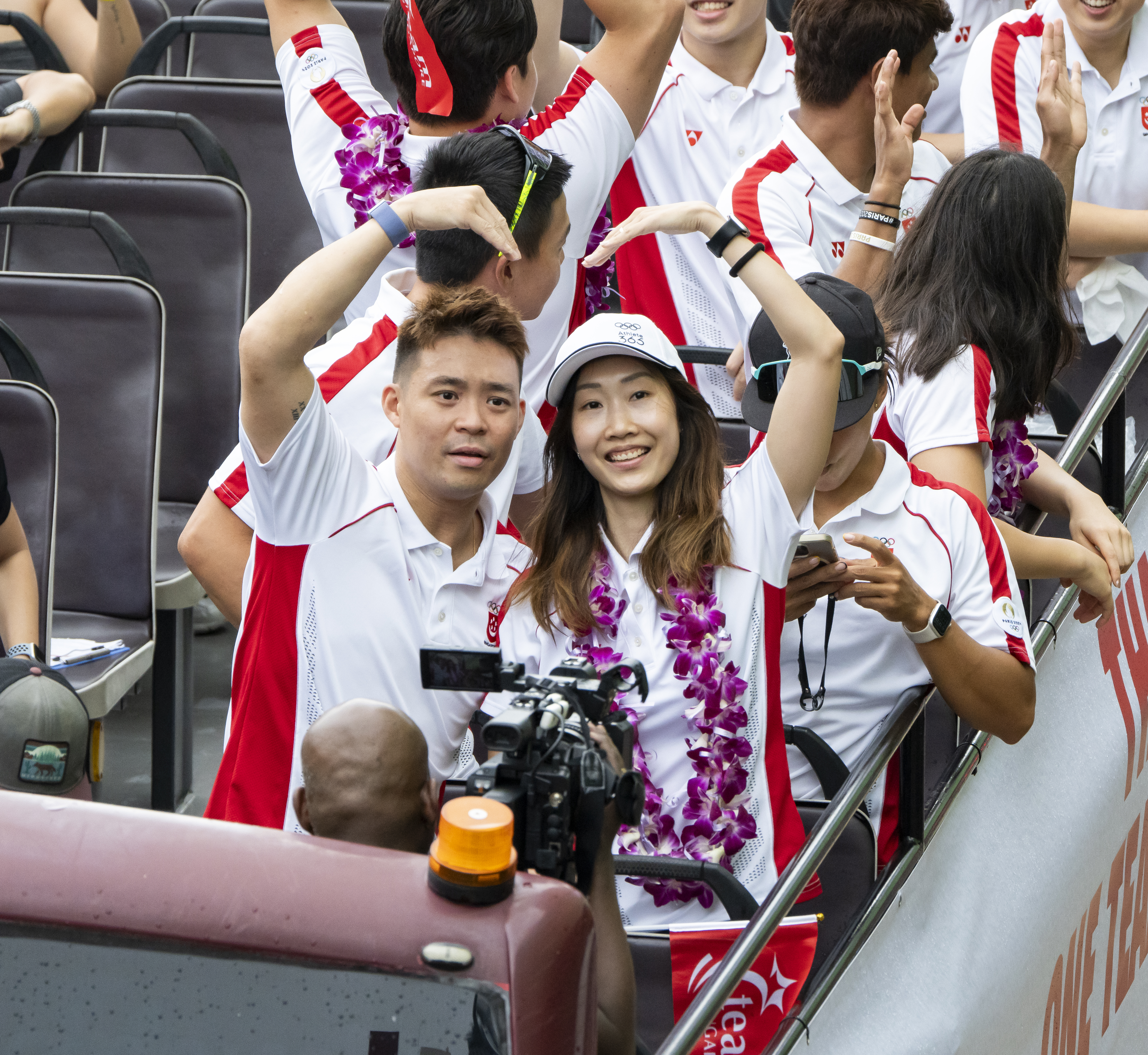
Hee and Tan with other Singapore Olympians during an open-top bus parade in 2024

Hee opened the 2022 season by winning the mixed doubles title at the India Open partnering Jessica Tan. The duo later captured their second World Tour title of the year by winning the Orléans Masters.

In May 2022, Hee competed at the 2021 SEA Games. He won the bronze medals in the men's team and doubles events.

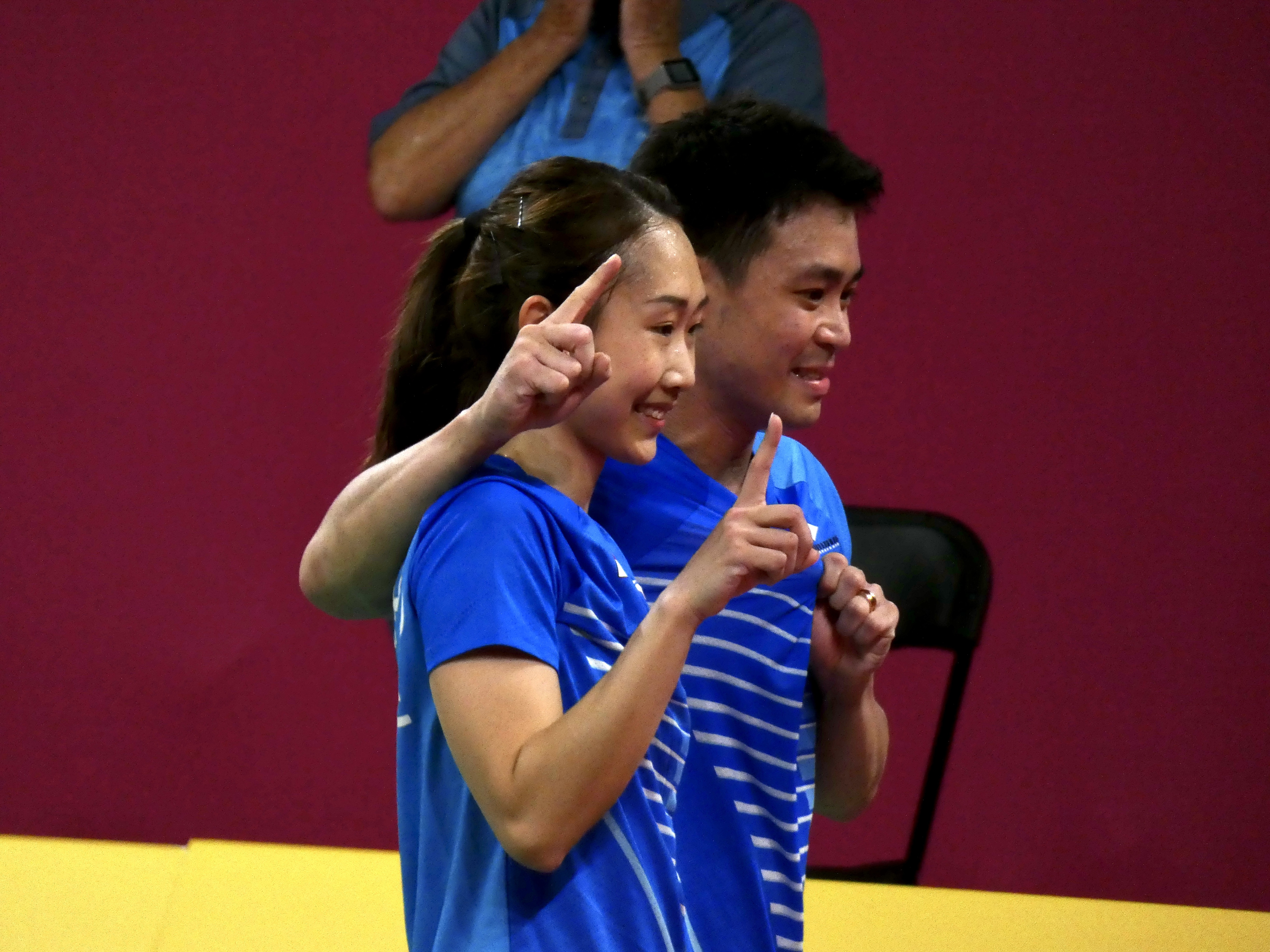
Hee and Tan after winning the mixed doubles final at the 2022 Commonwealth Games in Birmingham, England

At the 2022 Commonwealth Games in August, Hee was part of the Singaporean team who won the bronze medal in the mixed team events as the Singaporean team defeated England 3–0 at the bronze medal playoff. Hee had also competed at the individual mixed doubles event with his wife, Tan. They won a historic gold medal and Singapore's first Commonwealth Games badminton mixed doubles gold after beating England's Marcus Ellis and Lauren Smith in the final, with a score of 21–16, 21–15 in straight sets.

=== 2023–2024: Roller Coaster Journey to Paris Olympics ===
After crowning as the Commonwealth Games mixed-double champion in 2022, the forms of Hee and Tan dipped. The duo suffered early-round exits in their subsequent tournaments in 2022 and won just three out of nine matches in their first six tournaments of 2023. The 2024 Paris Olympics qualification period began on May 1, 2023. However, the chances of the pair qualifying for the Olympics were slim, as they won only one of their next nine matches. The turnaround came after they started playing in lower-tier tournaments to boost confidence. They clinched second place in the Abu Dhabi Masters (BWF World Tour 100) in October and won the Iris Open, a BWF international challenge tournament in November. They ended 2023 with another two silverware from BWF World Tour 100 events: winning the Guwahati Masters and making the final of Odisha Masters. The haul of points from these tournaments significantly improved their chance to qualify for the Olympics.

In 2024, Hee and Tan started the year strong by making it into the semi-final of Malaysia Open, a BWF World Tour 1000 event. However, since then, second-round appearances were their best in all subsequent tournaments until the end of the 2024 Paris Olympics qualification period. They ranked 18th on the BWF Race to Paris rankings on April 30, 2024, and thus missed out on the automatic qualification spots. There were only 16 slots for the doubles at the Paris Olympics. Only the first 13 eligible pairs were allocated slots via the Race to Paris rankings, while the remaining three spots were given to the continental champions of America, Africa and Oceania.

Fortunately, Hee and Tan received a lifeline after Australia, which had qualified in four badminton events, elected to take up the slots in the women's singles and women's doubles, thus freeing up a mixed doubles spot for Hee and Tan, the next eligible pair in the rankings. They became the first local-born mixed doubles duo from Singapore to qualify for the Olympic Games. In the badminton mixed-double events in the 2024 Paris Olympics, Hee and Tan were assigned to Group D together with Feng Yanzhe / Huang Dongping of China (2nd seed), Chen Tang Jie / Toh Ee Wei from Malaysia, and the American pair of Vinson Chiu / Jennie Gai. Hee and Tan played Chen and Toh in the opening match but lost 23–21 and 21–12. Up against China's world no. 2 pair Feng and Huang next, the duo could not overcome their rivals, losing 21–13, 21–17, thus missing out on the quarter-finals Hee and Tan ended their Olympics campaign with a win though as they beat United States’ Chiu and Gai, 21–17, 21–12 in the last group fixture.

=== 2024: A New Partnership With Jin Yujia ===
Post-Olympics, Hee and Tan continued to contest in major World Tour tournaments, but all ended with 1st round exits. While competing in the Macau Open, where they were seeded second, their campaign was abruptly halted in the first round against Ye Hong Wei and Nicole Chan (Chinese Taipei). Tan suffered a hamstring injury amid the second set, and the duo had to retire.

It was announced in November 2024 that Hee would form a new partnership with Jin Yujia, as Jessica Tan had not fully recovered from her injuries and was not sufficiently competition-fit. The Hee-Jin partnership had a promising start in their first competition by reaching the semi-finals of Guwahati Masters. A week later, they made it into the final at the Odisha Masters but fell 15–21, 21–15, 21–15 in 54 minutes to China's Gao Jiaxuan and Tang Ruizhi to finish runners-up. Finally, In only their third competition together, Hee and Jin succeeded in capturing their first title together at the Bangladesh International Challenge beating India's Bokka Navaneeth and Ritika Thaker 21–14, 21–16 in the final.

The Hee-Jin partnership ended in 2025, as they failed to reach the last 16 in 15 tournaments and were eliminated in the quarter-finals at the SEA Games 2025.

=== 2026: A Multi-National Partnership With Gloria Widjaja ===
Hee started forming a multi-national mixed doubles pairing with Gloria Widjaja, a former world junior champion from Indonesia, to compete on the BWF World Tour. The pairing achieved good results and garnered a creditable 6–4 win-loss record with the over four tournaments. In the All England Open, they almost caused an upset, taking top seeds Feng Yanzhe and Huang Dongping to three games in the first round, narrowly losing 21–18, 18–21, 19–21. They made the second round of the Thailand Masters, quarterfinals of the Indonesia Masters, and semifinals of the German Open. However, the partnership ended on March 16 with Gloria Widjaja reuniting with compatriot Rehan Kusharjanto, who returned from a serious knee injury.

Hee became a sparring partner for the Singapore National Team, helping doubles head coach Paulus Firman guide younger players. In July-August, he paired with Wesley Koh to play men's doubles at the Taipei Open and Korea Masters. Then, in September, Hee and Howin Wong paired up to play in the Potianak Indonesia Masters and Vietnam Open. Hee and Wong reached the final of the latter tournament but lost to Chen Zhi-ray and Lin Yu-chieh of Chinese Taipei, 21–15, 15–21, 15–21.

In October, Hee returned to mixed doubles competition with Gloria Widjaja again by competing in the Kudus Indonesia Masters. They made the final of this Super 100 tournament. Against the young Chinese pair Li Hong Yi and Huang Ke Xin, they took the first game 21-15, but eventually lost 5–21, 10–21.

== Personal life ==
Hee married fellow Singaporean shuttler Jessica Tan in October, 2021. They had often partnered at mixed doubles tournaments since the start of Hee's professional career. Their victory at the 2021 Czech Open, defeating Russians Lev Barinov and Anastasiia Boiarun, was their first tournament as a married duo. They were made HSBC Life Singapore's first brand ambassadors in 2023. In 2024, Singlife committed to a sponsorship deal with the couple upon their Olympic qualification.

== Awards and nominations ==
Hee and Jessica Tan were nominated for the 2022 ST Athlete of the Year Award. They were also conferred the Team of the Year (Event) award in the Singapore Sports Awards 2023 by the Singapore National Olympic Council.

== Achievements ==
=== Commonwealth Games ===
Mixed doubles
Year	Venue	Partner	Opponent	Score	Result	Ref.
2022	National Exhibition Centre; Birmingham, England	(Singapore) Jessica Tan	(England) Marcus Ellis (England) Lauren Smith	21–16, 21–15	Gold	

=== SEA Games ===
Men's doubles
Year	Venue	Partner	Opponent	Score	Result	Ref.
2021	Bac Giang Gymnasium; Bắc Giang, Vietnam	(Singapore) Loh Kean Hean	(Indonesia) Pramudya Kusumawardana (Indonesia) Yeremia Rambitan	21–15, 17–21, 19–21	Bronze	

=== BWF World Tour (3 titles, 5 runners-up) ===
The BWF World Tour, which was announced on 19 March 2017 and implemented in 2018, is a series of elite badminton tournaments sanctioned by the Badminton World Federation (BWF). The BWF World Tours are divided into levels of World Tour Finals, Super 1000, Super 750, Super 500, Super 300 (part of the HSBC World Tour), and the BWF Tour Super 100.

Men's doubles
Year	Tournament	Level	Partner	Opponent	Score	Result	Ref.
2026	Vietnam Open	Super 100	(Singapore) Howin Wong	(Chinese Taipei) Chen Zhi-ray (Chinese Taipei) Lin Yu-chieh	14–21, 12–21	(silver) Runner-up	

Mixed doubles
Year	Tournament	Level	Partner	Opponent	Score	Result	Ref.
2022	India Open	Super 500	(Singapore) Jessica Tan	(Malaysia) Chen Tang Jie (Malaysia) Peck Yen Wei	21–15, 21–18	(gold) Winner	
2022	Orléans Masters	Super 100	(Singapore) Jessica Tan	(Indonesia) Rehan Naufal Kusharjanto (Indonesia) Lisa Ayu Kusumawati	21–12, 16–21, 21–13	(gold) Winner	
2023	Abu Dhabi Masters	Super 100	(Singapore) Jessica Tan	(Denmark) Mads Vestergaard (Denmark) Christine Busch	22–20, 17–21, 18–21	(silver) Runner-up	
2023	Guwahati Masters	Super 100	(Singapore) Jessica Tan	(Denmark) Mads Vestergaard (Denmark) Christine Busch	21–19, 21–11	(gold) Winner	
2023	Odisha Masters	Super 100	(Singapore) Jessica Tan	(India) Dhruv Kapila (India) Tanisha Crasto	21–17, 19–21, 21–23	(silver) Runner-up	
2024	Odisha Masters	Super 100	(Singapore) Jin Yujia	(China) Gao Jiaxuan (China) Tang Ruizhi	21–15, 15–21, 15–21	(silver) Runner-up	
2026	Indonesia Masters	Super 100	(Indonesia) Gloria Emanuelle Widjaja	(China) Li Hong Yi (China) Huang Ke Xin	21–15, 5–21, 10–21	(silver) Runner-up	

=== BWF International Challenge/Series (12 titles, 5 runners-up) ===
Men's doubles
Year	Tournament	Partner	Opponent	Score	Result
2015	Vietnam International	(Singapore) Hendra Wijaya	(Chinese Taipei) Lu Ching-yao (Chinese Taipei) Tien Tzu-chieh	13–21, 21–14, 21–23	(silver) Runner-up
2015	Singapore International	(Singapore) Loh Kean Hean	(Indonesia) Hardianto (Indonesia) Kenas Adi Haryanto	13–21, 21–16, 21–19	(gold) Winner
2017	Nepal International	(Singapore) Danny Bawa Chrisnanta	(Malaysia) Ian Wong Jien Sern (Malaysia) Tan Chee Tean	22–20, 14–21, 21–16	(gold) Winner
2018	South Australia International	(Singapore) Danny Bawa Chrisnanta	(Japan) Akira Koga (Japan) Taichi Saito	11–21, 21–19, 16–21	(silver) Runner-up
2018	Sydney International	(Singapore) Danny Bawa Chrisnanta	(Japan) Hiroki Okamura (Japan) Masayuki Onodera	6–21, 11–21	(silver) Runner-up
2018	Singapore International	(Singapore) Danny Bawa Chrisnanta	(Hong Kong) Yonny Chung (Hong Kong) Tam Chun Hei	21–13, 18–21, 19–21	(silver) Runner-up
2021	Dutch Open	(Singapore) Loh Kean Hean	(Malaysia) Tan Kian Meng (Malaysia) Tan Wee Kiong	21–14, 18–21, 22–20	(gold) Winner
2021	Czech Open	(Singapore) Loh Kean Hean	(Malaysia) Man Wei Chong (Malaysia) Tee Kai Wun	13–21, 21–15, 21–15	(gold) Winner

Mixed doubles
Year	Tournament	Partner	Opponent	Score	Result
2014	Singapore International	(Singapore) Jessica Tan	(Singapore) Loh Kean Hean (Singapore) Dellis Yuliana	21–19, 19–21, 21–14	(gold) Winner
2014	Malaysia International	(Singapore) Jessica Tan	(Indonesia) Hafiz Faizal (Indonesia) Shella Devi Aulia	21–19, 19–21, 18–21	(silver) Runner-up
2015	Bangladesh International	(Singapore) Jessica Tan	(Malaysia) Tan Wee Gieen (Malaysia) Shevon Jemie Lai	21–10, 19–21, 21–12	(gold) Winner
2016	Smiling Fish International	(Singapore) Jessica Tan	(Malaysia) Wong Fai Yin (Malaysia) Shevon Jemie Lai	21–16, 21–17	(gold) Winner
2016	Hungarian International	(Singapore) Jessica Tan	(Poland) Paweł Pietryja (Poland) Aneta Wojtkowska	11–6, 11–7, 13–11	(gold) Winner
2018	South Australia International	(Singapore) Citra Putri Sari Dewi	(Japan) Kohei Gondo (Japan) Ayane Kurihara	22–20, 21–18	(gold) Winner
2021	Czech Open	(Singapore) Jessica Tan	(Russia) Lev Barinov (Russia) Anastasiia Boiarun	21–18, 21–12	(gold) Winner
2023	Irish Open	(Singapore) Jessica Tan	(England) Gregory Mairs (England) Jenny Mairs	21–17, 18–21, 21–15	(gold) Winner
2024	Bangladesh International	(Singapore) Jin Yujia	(India) Bokka Navaneeth (India) Ritika Thaker	21–14, 21–16	(gold) Winner

BWF International Challenge tournament
BWF International Series tournament
BWF Future Series tournament
