= 2025 Badminton Asia Junior Championships – Girls' singles =

Tournament details
- Dates: 23 – 27 July 2025
- Edition: 25th
- Level: International
- Nations: 19
- Venue: Manahan Indoor Sports Hall
- Location: Surakarta, Central Java, Indonesia

The girls' singles tournament of the 2025 Badminton Asia Junior Championships was held from 23 to 27 July. Xu Wenjing from China clinched this title in the last edition in 2024, but unable to defend her title after losing from Janyaporn Meepanthong from Thailand in fourth round.

== Seeds ==
Seeds were announced on 24 June. Click on the seed number of a player to go to their draw section.

1. (Thailand) Anyapat Phichitpreechasak (third round)
2. (India) Tanvi Sharma (semi-finals)
3. (Thailand) Yataweemin Ketklieng (quarter-finals)
4. (China) Xu Wenjing (fourth round)
5. (Indonesia) Thalita Ramadhani Wiryawan (quarter-finals)
6. (United Arab Emirates) Mysha Omer Khan (second round)
7. (Sri Lanka) Ranithma Liyanage (fourth round)
8. (China) Yin Yiqing (champion)

9. (Malaysia) Lim Zhi Shin (second round)
10. (Malaysia) Eng Ler Qi (third round)
11. (Malaysia) Oo Shan Zi (third round)
12. (Chinese Taipei) Liao Jui-chi (fourth round)
13. (Thailand) Passa-Orn Phannachet (fourth round)
14. (South Korea) Kim Bo-hye (third round)
15. (India) Rujula Ramu (second round)
16. (Kazakhstan) Diana Namenova (second round)

== Draw ==
=== Finals ===
Quarter-finals
(Japan) Saki Matsumoto	19	10
(China) Liu Siya	21	21
(Thailand) Janyaporn Meepanthong	18	21	17
(India) Vennala Kalagotla	21	17	21
8	(China) Yin Yiqing	21	21
3	(Thailand) Yataweemin Ketklieng	13	14
5	(Indonesia) Thalita Ramadhani Wiryawan	19	14
2	(India) Tanvi Sharma	21	21

Semi-finals
(China) Liu Siya	21	21
(India) Vennala Kalagotla	15	18
8	(China) Yin Yiqing	21	21
2	(India) Tanvi Sharma	13	14

Final
(China) Liu Siya	13	13
8	(China) Yin Yiqing	21	21

=== Top half ===
==== Section 1 ====
First round

Second round
1	(Thailand) A Phichitpreechasak	21	21
(Singapore) Tan M Z X	10	4
(United Arab Emirates) M Sundarapandian	14	12
(Japan) S Matsumoto	21	21
12	(Chinese Taipei) Liao J-c	21	11	21
(Indonesia) S Amiradana	14	21	17
(Vietnam) Nguyen V N T	11	8
(China) Sun YF	21	21

Third round
1	(Thailand) A Phichitpreechasak	13	15
(Japan) S Matsumoto	21	21
12	(Chinese Taipei) Liao J-c	21	21
(China) Sun YF	15	19

Fourth round
(Japan) S Matsumoto	17	23	21
12	(Chinese Taipei) Liao J-c	21	21	16

==== Section 2 ====
First round
(Malaysia) Lee M	21	21
(Philippines) R Quierez	11	7

Second round
7	(Sri Lanka) R Liyanage	21	21
(South Korea) Cheon H-i	17	16
(Macau) Chan H W	9	17
(Indonesia) K N Aulia	21	21
15	(India) R Ramu	14	21	15
(China) Liu SY	21	18	21
(Myanmar) N S C Thaw	4	4
(Malaysia) Lee M	21	21

Third round
7	(Sri Lanka) R Liyanage	21	21
(Indonesia) K N Aulia	18	18
(China) Liu SY	21	21
(Malaysia) Lee M	14	10

Fourth round
7	(Sri Lanka) R Liyanage	21	12
(China) Liu SY	23	21

==== Section 3 ====
First round
(Thailand) J Meepanthong	21	21
(Japan) M Oishi	16	15

Second round
4	(China) Xu WJ	21	25	21
(Hong Kong) Wong Y	14	27	11
(Sri Lanka) V Wanniarachchi	10	5
(Vietnam) Bùi B P	21	21
14	(South Korea) Kim B-h	21	21
(Malaysia) Low Z Y	18	13
(Singapore) Zakaria A	11	18
(Thailand) J Meepanthong	21	21

Third round
4	(China) Xu WJ	21	21
(Vietnam) Bùi B P	12	9
14	(South Korea) Kim B-h	21	23	14
(Thailand) J Meepanthong	12	25	21

Fourth round
4	(China) Xu WJ	20	21	20
(Thailand) J Meepanthong	22	12	22

==== Section 4 ====
First round
(Kazakhstan) A Kuleshova	6	10
(India) V Kalagotla	21	21

Second round
6	(United Arab Emirates) M A Khan	15	12
(Philippines) C R Fuentespina	21	21
(Chinese Taipei) Wen S-y	21	21
(Thailand) P Wechawong	17	9
10	(Malaysia) Eng L Q	21	21
(Myanmar) E C Phoo	4	16
(Indonesia) A Zerlina	18	16
(India) V Kalagotla	21	21

Third round
(Philippines) C R Fuentespina	18	10
(Chinese Taipei) Wen S-y	21	21
10	(Malaysia) Eng L Q	12	20
(India) V Kalagotla	21	22

Fourth round
(Chinese Taipei) Wen S-y	18	19
(India) V Kalagotla	21	21

=== Bottom half ===
==== Section 5 ====
First round
(Philippines) E E Bejasa	14	21	11
(Vietnam) Nguyen T T H	21	16	21

Second round
(Vietnam) Nguyen T T H	16	12
(Indonesia) C C Purwanto	21	21
(Sri Lanka) S Ranasinghe	21	21
16	(Kazakhstan) D Namenova	17	15
(Chinese Taipei) Liao Y-c	21	21
(South Korea) Lee G-h	10	8
(Japan) Y Nagafuchi	24	13	13
8	(China) Yin YQ	22	21	21

Third round
(Indonesia) C C Purwanto	21	21
(Sri Lanka) S Ranasinghe	15	11
(Chinese Taipei) Liao Y-c	24	13	20
8	(China) Yin YQ	22	21	22

Fourth round
(Indonesia) C C Purwanto	17	16
8	(China) Yin YQ	21	21

==== Section 6 ====
First round
(Myanmar) L Lin Htet	12	9
(Hong Kong) Ip S Y	21	21

Second round
(Hong Kong) Ip S Y	21	21
(Singapore) Likwan S A	17	9
(South Korea) Kim H-b	14	26	21
9	(Malaysia) Lim Z S	21	24	10
(Macau) Ung C I	9	10
(India) T R Andluri	21	21
(Indonesia) J Angelia	16	15
3	(Thailand) Y Ketklieng	21	21

Third round
(Hong Kong) Ip S Y	14	23	13
(South Korea) Kim H-b	21	21	21
(India) T R Andluri	10	8
3	(Thailand) Y Ketklieng	21	21

Fourth round
(South Korea) Kim H-b	11	18
3	(Thailand) Y Ketklieng	21	21

==== Section 7 ====
First round
(Japan) Y Watanabe	21	21
(Sri Lanka) D Ambalangodage	8	8

Second round
(Japan) Y Watanabe	21	21
(Hong Kong) Liu H K	7	18
(South Korea) Choi Y-d	10	21	14
11	(Malaysia) Oo S Z	21	19	21
(Philippines) K F Taniegra	8	7
(Chinese Taipei) Ke J-l	21	21
(Vietnam) Pham T T A	12	9
5	(Indonesia) T R Wiryawan	21	21

Third round
(Japan) Y Watanabe	21	21
11	(Malaysia) Oo S Z	11	14
(Chinese Taipei) Ke J-l	7	13
5	(Indonesia) T R Wiryawan	21	21

Fourth round
(Japan) Y Watanabe	21	21	16
5	(Indonesia) T R Wiryawan	23	15	21

==== Section 8 ====
First round

Second round
(Singapore) Chia X Y	21	21
(Sri Lanka) N Ratnayake	19	9
(Myanmar) Y T Maung	6	5
13	(Thailand) P-O Phannachet	21	21
(China) Shi SC	21	21
(Indonesia) S Y Maitsaa	12	18
(United Arab Emirates) V Kalidasan	6	6
2	(India) T Sharma	21	21

Third round
(Singapore) Chia X Y	9	10
13	(Thailand) P-O Phannachet	21	21
(China) Shi SC	19	14
2	(India) T Sharma	21	21

Fourth round
13	(Thailand) P-O Phannachet	14	15
2	(India) T Sharma	21	21
