= 2024 Badminton Asia Team Championships =

Badminton championships

Tournament details
- Dates: 13–18 February
- Edition: 5
- Venue: Setia City Convention Centre
- Location: Shah Alam, Selangor, Malaysia

Champions
- Men's teams: China
- Women's teams: India
- Official website: selbatc2024.com

The 2024 Badminton Asia Team Championships (officially known as the SELANGOR Badminton Asia Team Championships 2024 presented by PKNS for sponsorship reasons) was the fifth edition of Badminton Asia Team Championships, held at the Setia City Convention Centre in Shah Alam, Selangor, Malaysia, from 13 to 18 February 2024.

== Background ==
The 2024 Badminton Asia Team Championships was organised by Badminton Asia along with the Badminton Association of Malaysia as the host organiser. It was sanctioned by the Badminton World Federation. It also served as the Asian qualifiers for the 2024 Thomas & Uber Cup to be held in Chengdu, China. Malaysia and Indonesia were the defending champions of the men's and women's category respectively.

=== Competition format ===
The competition begins with a group stage: all participating teams are divided into four groups of two or three teams each. Each team plays each other once, with the top two teams advancing to the knockout stage. A match is won by the team that first wins three games. The eight teams that qualify will be drawn and compete in a knockout format until the final.

Tie-breaker

Team ranking within a group is determined based on the following criteria: number of wins; match difference; game difference; and points difference. If two teams are tied after a criterion is applied, the winner of the match between the two teams will be ranked higher. A draw will be held to determine ranking if there are still teams tied after all criteria are applied.

=== Host selection ===
On 30 November 2023, Selangor was announced to return as hosts for the tournament with the venue being the same as the last edition at the Setia City Convention Centre in Shah Alam.

== Schedule ==
Day, Date	Time	Phase
Tuesday, 13 February	09:00	Group Stage
Tuesday, 13 February	13:00	Group Stage
Tuesday, 13 February	17:00	Group Stage
Wednesday, 14 February	09:00	Group Stage
Wednesday, 14 February	13:00	Group Stage
Wednesday, 14 February	17:00	Group Stage
Thursday, 15 February	09:00	Group Stage
Thursday, 15 February	13:00	Group Stage
Thursday, 15 February	17:00	Group Stage
Friday, 6 February	10:00	Quarter-finals
Friday, 6 February	16:00	Quarter-finals
Saturday, 7 February	10:00	Semi-finals
Saturday, 7 February	16:00	Semi-finals
Sunday, 8 February	10:00	Finals
Sunday, 8 February	16:00	Finals
Note: All times are in Malaysia Standard Time (UTC+08:00)

== Teams ==
=== Participating members ===
The tournament will feature 15 teams competing in the men's category and 11 teams in the women's category. The teams had to submit the squads by 26 January 2024 and which should consists of three singles players and two doubles pairs. A team has to nominate a minimum of four and a maximum of ten players.

Nation	Men's	Women's	Nation	Men's	Women's
Brunei	Yes	—N/a	Kazakhstan	Yes	Yes
China	Yes	Yes	South Korea	Yes	—N/a
Chinese Taipei	Yes	Yes	Malaysia	Yes	Yes
Hong Kong	Yes	Yes	Myanmar	Yes	—N/a
India	Yes	Yes	Saudi Arabia	Yes	—N/a
Indonesia	Yes	Yes	Singapore	Yes	Yes
Japan	Yes	Yes	Thailand	Yes	Yes
United Arab Emirates	Yes	Yes			

== Draw ==
=== Seedings ===
The seeding was based on team ranking on 9 January 2024.

- Men's team
  1. China
  2. Indonesia
  3. Japan
  4. Malaysia
- Women's team
  1. China
  2. Japan
  3. Thailand
  4. Indonesia

=== Drawn groups ===
The draw was held on 30 January 2024 at the Selangor State Sports Council in Shah Alam at 1:30pm. Both the men's and women's team group stage consist of 4 groups, A, B, C and D (men's) and W, X, Y and Z (women's). The men's groups consists of 4 teams each except group A (3 teams) while the women's groups consists of 3 teams each except for group W (2 teams).

- Men's team

Group A	Group B	Group C	Group D
China (1); India; Hong Kong	Malaysia (4, H); Chinese Taipei; Kazakhstan; Brunei	Japan (3); Thailand; Singapore; Myanmar	Indonesia (2); South Korea; United Arab Emirates; Saudi Arabia

- Women's team

Group W	Group X	Group Y	Group Z
China (1); India	Indonesia (4); Hong Kong; Kazakhstan	Thailand (3); Malaysia; United Arab Emirates	Japan (2); Chinese Taipei; Singapore

== Medal summary ==
=== Medal table ===
* Host nation (Malaysia)

Rank	Nation	Gold	Silver	Bronze	Total
1	China	1	0	0	1
1	India	1	0	0	1
3	Malaysia*	0	1	0	1
3	Thailand	0	1	0	1
5	Japan	0	0	2	2
6	Indonesia	0	0	1	1
6	South Korea	0	0	1	1
Totals (7 entries)		2	2	4	8

=== Medalists ===
Event	Gold	Silver	Bronze
Men's team	China; Chen Boyang; He Jiting; Lei Lanxi; Liu Yi; Lu Guangzu; Ren Xiangyu; Wang Zhengxing; Weng Hongyang; Xie Haonan; Zeng Weihan	Malaysia; Aaron Chia; Choong Hon Jian; Eogene Ewe; Goh Sze Fei; Muhammad Haikal; Nur Izzuddin; Lee Zii Jia; Leong Jun Hao; Ng Tze Yong; Soh Wooi Yik	Japan; Akira Koga; Kenya Mitsuhashi; Kento Momota; Kodai Naraoka; Kenta Nishimoto; Takuma Obayashi; Hiroki Okamura; Taichi Saito; Kazuki Shibata; Koki Watanabe; Naoki Yamada
Men's team	China; Chen Boyang; He Jiting; Lei Lanxi; Liu Yi; Lu Guangzu; Ren Xiangyu; Wang Zhengxing; Weng Hongyang; Xie Haonan; Zeng Weihan	Malaysia; Aaron Chia; Choong Hon Jian; Eogene Ewe; Goh Sze Fei; Muhammad Haikal; Nur Izzuddin; Lee Zii Jia; Leong Jun Hao; Ng Tze Yong; Soh Wooi Yik	South Korea; Cho Geon-yeop; Jeon Hyeok-jin; Jeong Min-seon; Jin Yong; Kang Min-hyuk; Ki Dong-ju; Kim Won-ho; Lee Yun-gyu; Seo Seung-jae; Woo Seung-hoon
Women's team	India; Ashmita Chaliha; Tanisha Crasto; Treesa Jolly; Anmol Kharb; Priya Konjengbam; Shruti Mishra; Ashwini Ponnappa; Gayatri Gopichand; P. V. Sindhu; Tanvi Sharma	Thailand; Benyapa Aimsaard; Nuntakarn Aimsaard; Lalinrat Chaiwan; Pornpicha Choeikeewong; Laksika Kanlaha; Supanida Katethong; Jongkolphan Kititharakul; Tidapron Kleebyeesun; Phataimas Muenwong; Busanan Ongbamrungphan; Rawinda Prajongjai	Indonesia; Komang Ayu Cahya Dewi; Febriana Dwipuji Kusuma; Lanny Tria Mayasari; Amallia Cahaya Pratiwi; Meilysa Trias Puspita Sari; Rachel Allessya Rose; Ribka Sugiarto; Putri Kusuma Wardani; Ester Nurumi Tri Wardoyo; Stephanie Widjaja
Women's team	India; Ashmita Chaliha; Tanisha Crasto; Treesa Jolly; Anmol Kharb; Priya Konjengbam; Shruti Mishra; Ashwini Ponnappa; Gayatri Gopichand; P. V. Sindhu; Tanvi Sharma	Thailand; Benyapa Aimsaard; Nuntakarn Aimsaard; Lalinrat Chaiwan; Pornpicha Choeikeewong; Laksika Kanlaha; Supanida Katethong; Jongkolphan Kititharakul; Tidapron Kleebyeesun; Phataimas Muenwong; Busanan Ongbamrungphan; Rawinda Prajongjai	Japan; Rin Iwanaga; Nami Matsuyama; Rena Miyaura; Tomoka Miyazaki; Kie Nakanishi; Natsuki Nidaira; Aya Ohori; Nozomi Okuhara; Ayako Sakuramoto; Chiharu Shida
