= Saudi Arabia national badminton team =

National badminton team representing Saudi Arabia

Saudi Arabia
- Nickname(s): أخضر الريشة ('Akhḍar al-Rīša, "Green Badminton")
- Association: Saudi Badminton Federation (SBF)
- Confederation: BA (Asia)
- President: Mogren Al-Mogren

BWF ranking
- Current ranking: 80 ▼2 (2 January 2024)
- Highest ranking: 78 (3 October 2023)

Asian Men's Team Championships
- Appearances: 1 (first in 2024)
- Best result: Group stage

The Saudi Arabia national badminton team (Arabic: المنتخب السعودي للريشة الطائرة) represents Saudi Arabia in international badminton team competitions and is organized by the Saudi Badminton Federation. The team are also known as Akhdar Al-Riyshat (Green Badminton). The team are affiliated with BWF, Badminton Asia and the Arab Badminton Federation.

The Saudi Arabian team started sending its players to compete internationally at the 2017 BWF World Junior Championships in Yogyakarta. Saudi Arabia also made its Asian Games debut in badminton at the 2018 Asian Games.

== History ==
Badminton made its way into Saudi Arabia in the early 1980s, when the sport was played mainly by expatriates in the country. In 2013, the country held its first official recreational badminton tournament in Mecca. The national team was formed soon after the establishment of the Saudi Badminton Federation in January 2014.

Saudi players then started to compete in international tournaments after the national federation obtained membership from the Badminton World Federation, most notably the 2017 BWF World Junior Championships.

=== Men's team ===
Saudi Arabia made its debut in the Asian Men's Team Championships in 2024. A total of 4 players were selected to represent the country in the team championships. The team were drawn into Group D with Indonesia, South Korea and the United Arab Emirates. The team started off with a 5–0 loss to Indonesia. The team then lost to South Korea by the same margin. The team ended their campaign with a 5–0 loss against the United Arab Emirates.

== Competitive record ==
=== Thomas Cup ===
Year	Round	Pos
1949	Not a member of the BWF	
1952	Not a member of the BWF	
1955	Not a member of the BWF	
1958	Not a member of the BWF	
1961	Not a member of the BWF	
1964	Not a member of the BWF	
1967	Not a member of the BWF	
1970	Not a member of the BWF	
1973	Not a member of the BWF	
1976	Not a member of the BWF	
1979	Not a member of the BWF	
1982	Not a member of the BWF	
1984	Not a member of the BWF	
1986	Not a member of the BWF	
1988	Not a member of the BWF	
1990	Not a member of the BWF	
1992	Not a member of the BWF	
1994	Not a member of the BWF	
1996	Not a member of the BWF	
1998	Not a member of the BWF	
2000	Not a member of the BWF	
2002	Not a member of the BWF	
2004	Not a member of the BWF	
2006	Not a member of the BWF	
2008	Not a member of the BWF	
2010	Not a member of the BWF	
2012	Not a member of the BWF	
2014	Not a member of the BWF	
2016	Not a member of the BWF	
2018	Did not enter	
2020	Did not enter	
2022	Did not enter	
2024	Did not qualify	
2026	TBD	
2028	TBD	
2030	TBD	

=== Uber Cup ===
Year	Round	Pos
1957	Not a member of the BWF	
1960	Not a member of the BWF	
1963	Not a member of the BWF	
1966	Not a member of the BWF	
1969	Not a member of the BWF	
1972	Not a member of the BWF	
1975	Not a member of the BWF	
1978	Not a member of the BWF	
1981	Not a member of the BWF	
1984	Not a member of the BWF	
1986	Not a member of the BWF	
1988	Not a member of the BWF	
1990	Not a member of the BWF	
1992	Not a member of the BWF	
1994	Not a member of the BWF	
1996	Not a member of the BWF	
1998	Not a member of the BWF	
2000	Not a member of the BWF	
2002	Not a member of the BWF	
2004	Not a member of the BWF	
2006	Not a member of the BWF	
2008	Not a member of the BWF	
2010	Not a member of the BWF	
2012	Not a member of the BWF	
2014	Not a member of the BWF	
2016	Not a member of the BWF	
2018	Did not enter	
2020	Did not enter	
2022	Did not enter	
2024	Did not enter	
2026	TBD	
2028	TBD	
2030	TBD	

=== Sudirman Cup ===
Year	Round	Pos
1989	Not a member of the BWF	
1991	Not a member of the BWF	
1993	Not a member of the BWF	
1995	Not a member of the BWF	
1997	Not a member of the BWF	
1999	Not a member of the BWF	
2001	Not a member of the BWF	
2003	Not a member of the BWF	
2005	Not a member of the BWF	
2007	Not a member of the BWF	
2009	Not a member of the BWF	
2011	Not a member of the BWF	
2013	Not a member of the BWF	
2015	Not a member of the BWF	
2017	Did not enter	
2019	Did not enter	
2021	Did not enter	
2023	Did not enter	
2025	TBD	
2027	TBD	
2029	TBD	

=== Asian Games ===
==== Men's team ====
Year	Round	Pos
1962	Did not enter	
1966	Did not enter	
1970	Did not enter	
1974	Did not enter	
1978	Did not enter	
1982	Did not enter	
1986	Did not enter	
1990	Did not enter	
1994	Did not enter	
1998	Did not enter	
2002	Did not enter	
2006	Did not enter	
2010	Did not enter	
2014	Did not enter	
2018	Did not enter	
2022	Did not enter	
2026	TBD	
2030	TBD	
2034	TBD	
2038	TBD	

==== Women's team ====
Year	Round	Pos
1962	Did not enter	
1966	Did not enter	
1970	Did not enter	
1974	Did not enter	
1978	Did not enter	
1982	Did not enter	
1986	Did not enter	
1990	Did not enter	
1994	Did not enter	
1998	Did not enter	
2002	Did not enter	
2006	Did not enter	
2010	Did not enter	
2014	Did not enter	
2018	Did not enter	
2022	Did not enter	
2026	TBD	
2030	TBD	
2034	TBD	
2038	TBD	

=== Asian Team Championships ===
==== Men's team ====
Year	Round	Pos
1962	Not a member of the BA	
1965	Not a member of the BA	
1969	Not a member of the BA	
1971	Not a member of the BA	
1976	Not a member of the BA	
1983	Not a member of the BA	
1985	Not a member of the BA	
1987	Not a member of the BA	
1989	Not a member of the BA	
1993	Not a member of the BA	
2004	Not a member of the BA	
2006	Not a member of the BA	
2008	Not a member of the BA	
2010	Not a member of the BA	
2012	Not a member of the BA	
2016	Not a member of the BA	
2018	Did not enter	
2020	Did not enter	
2022	Did not enter	
2024	Group stage	15th
2026	TBD	
2028	TBD	
2030	TBD	

==== Women's team ====
Year	Round	Pos
2004	Not a member of the BA	
2006	Not a member of the BA	
2008	Not a member of the BA	
2010	Not a member of the BA	
2012	Not a member of the BA	
2016	Not a member of the BA	
2018	Did not enter	
2020	Did not enter	
2022	Did not enter	
2024	Did not enter	
2026	TBD	
2028	TBD	
2030	TBD	

==== Mixed team ====
Year	Round	Pos
2017	Did not enter	
2019	Did not enter	
2023	Did not enter	
2025	TBD	
2027	TBD	
2029	TBD	

=== Arab Games ===
==== Men's team ====
Year	Round	Pos
1999	Did not enter	
2004	Did not enter	
2007	Did not enter	

==== Women's team ====
Year	Round	Pos
1999	Did not enter	
2004	Did not enter	
2007	Did not enter	

=== Arab Team Championships ===
==== Men's team ====
Year	Round	Pos
1996	Did not enter	
1998	Did not enter	
2000	Did not enter	
2002	Did not enter	
2004	Did not enter	
2009	Did not enter	
2011	Did not enter	
2017	Did not enter	

==== Women's team ====
Year	Round	Pos
1996	Did not enter	
1998	Did not enter	
2000	Did not enter	
2002	Did not enter	
2004	Did not enter	
2009	Did not enter	
2011	Did not enter	
2017	Did not enter	

**Red border color indicates tournament was held on home soil.

== Junior competitive record ==
=== Suhandinata Cup ===
Year	Round	Pos
2000	Not a member of the BWF	
2002	Not a member of the BWF	
2004	Not a member of the BWF	
2006	Not a member of the BWF	
2007	Not a member of the BWF	
2008	Not a member of the BWF	
2009	Not a member of the BWF	
2010	Not a member of the BWF	
2011	Not a member of the BWF	
2012	Not a member of the BWF	
2013	Not a member of the BWF	
2014	Not a member of the BWF	
2015	Not a member of the BWF	
2016	Not a member of the BWF	
2017	Did not enter	
2018	Did not enter	
2019	Did not enter	
2022	Did not enter	
2023	Did not enter	
2024	TBD	

=== Asian Junior Team Championships ===
==== Boys' team ====
Year	Round	Pos
1997	Not a member of the BA	
1998	Not a member of the BA	
1999	Not a member of the BA	
2000	Not a member of the BA	
2001	Not a member of the BA	
2002	Not a member of the BA	
2004	Not a member of the BA	
2005	Not a member of the BA	

==== Girls' team ====
Year	Round	Pos
1997	Not a member of the BA	
1998	Not a member of the BA	
1999	Not a member of the BA	
2000	Not a member of the BA	
2001	Not a member of the BA	
2002	Not a member of the BA	
2004	Not a member of the BA	
2005	Not a member of the BA	

==== Mixed team ====
Year	Round	Pos
2006	Not a member of the BA	
2007	Not a member of the BA	
2008	Not a member of the BA	
2009	Not a member of the BA	
2010	Not a member of the BA	
2011	Not a member of the BA	
2012	Not a member of the BA	
2013	Not a member of the BA	
2014	Not a member of the BA	
2015	Not a member of the BA	
2016	Not a member of the BA	
2017	Not a member of the BA	
2018	Did not enter	
2019	Did not enter	
2023	Did not enter	
2024	TBD	
2025	TBD	

=== Arab Junior Team Championships ===
==== Boys' team ====
Year	Round	Pos
2003	Did not enter	
2005	Did not enter	
2007	Did not enter	
2009	Did not enter	
2016	Did not enter	

==== Girls' team ====
Year	Round	Pos
2003	Did not enter	
2005	Did not enter	
2007	Did not enter	
2009	Did not enter	
2016	Did not enter	

**Red border color indicates tournament was held on home soil.

== Coaches ==
The following shows a list of coaches for the Saudi Arabia national badminton team.

=== Current coaches ===
- (Syria) Ammar Awad (2014–present)
- (Malaysia) Muhammad Hafiz Hashim (August 2025–present)
- (Saudi Arabia) Youssef Al-Ghamdi (2014–present)

== Players ==
=== Current squad ===
As of 2 January 2024

==== Men's team ====
Name	DoB/Age	Ranking of event		
Name	DoB/Age	MS	MD	XD
Abdullah Al-Harthi	10 December 2002 (age 23)	–	–	–
Yazan Saigh	29 September 2006 (age 19)	776	243	–
Abdullah Al-Dawsari	21 February 2005 (age 21)	969	243	–
Muath Al-Ghamdi	10 April 2002 (age 24)	537	496	397
Nawaf Al-Ghamdi	19 August 2002 (age 23)	683	496	451
Mahd Shaikh	23 October 2005 (age 20)	321	–	117

==== Women's team ====
Name	DoB/Age	Ranking of event		
Name	DoB/Age	WS	WD	XD
Rana Abu Harbesh	7 October 1995 (age 30)	–	–	–
Kadeeja Latheef	4 February 2006 (age 20)	241	138	117
Shatha Al-Mutairi	15 January 1995 (age 31)	–	–	–
Haya Al-Mudarra	1 August 1999 (age 26)	368	138	397
Albatul Al-Mutairi	15 September 2010 (age 15)	–	–	–
Fatimah Mousa	5 January 1994 (age 32)	–	–	–
