= Thailand national badminton team =

National badminton team representing Thailand

Thailand
- ทีมชาติไทย
- Nickname: ทัพลูกขนไก่ไทย; Thailand Shuttlecock Team
- Association: Badminton Thailand (BAT)
- Conference: Badminton Asia (BAC)
- Team history: Joined BWF Team in 1952
- BWF Ranking: Highest − 4 (3 October 2013); Current − 9 ▼1 (6 October 2026)
Uniforms
{{{title}}}	{{{title}}}

Sudirman Cup
- Appearances: 18 (First in 1989)
- Best result: Semifinal: 2013, 2017, 2019

Thomas Cup
- Appearances: 17 (First in 1958)
- Best result: Silver: 1961

Uber Cup
- Appearances: 10 (First in 1969)
- Best result: Silver: 2018

Asian Games: Men's Team
- Appearances: 14 (First in 1962)
- Best result: Gold: 1966

Asian Games: Women's Team
- Appearances: 14 (First in 1962)
- Best result: Silver: 1966, 1970, 2010

Badminton Asia Team Championships: Men's Team
- Appearances: 4 (First in 2016)
- Best result: Quarter-finalist: 2018, 2020

Badminton Asia Team Championships: Women's Team
- Appearances: 4 (First in 2016)
- Best result: Runner-up: 2024

Badminton Asia Mixed Team Championships:
- Appearances: 4 (First in 2017)
- Best result: Semi-finalist: 2017, 2023, 2025

The national badminton team of Thailand (Thai: แบดมินตันทีมชาติไทย) represents Thailand in international Badminton competitions. It is managed by the Badminton Association of Thailand (BAT).

The team reached the semi-finals of the Sudirman Cup in 2013, 2017, and 2019, making it the most successful team outside the traditional badminton powerhouses of Indonesia, South Korea, China, and Denmark. Additionally, the men's team finished as runners-up in the 1961 Thomas Cup, while the women's team achieved the same feat in the 2018 Uber Cup.

== Competitive record ==
A red border around the year indicates tournaments played within Thailand.

=== Sudirman Cup ===
Sudirman Cup
Edition	Group Stage	Quarter Finals	Semi Finals	Finals	Game Played	Won Match	Lost Match	Won Set	Lost Set	Result
1989	GS; Group 2	Round Robin			3	2	1	9	6	12th ▼ Group 3
1991	GS; Group 3	Round Robin			3	3	0	11	4	11th ▲ Group 2
1993	GS; Group 2	Round Robin			3	3	0	9	6	7th ▲ Group 1
1995	GS	SF		F	2	0	2	1	9	6th ▼ Group 2
1997	GS; Group 2	Round Robin		F	4	1	3	9	11	13th Group 2
1999	GS; Group 2	Round Robin		2nd Group 2	4	2	2	11	7	8th Group 2
2001	GS; Group 2	Round Robin		1st Group 2	Unknown					7th ▲ Group 1
2003	Withdrew									
2005	GS	SF		F	4	1	3	5	12	7th Group 1
2007	GS	SF		F	4	0	4	5	15	8th ▼ Group 2
2009	GS; Group 2	Round Robin		1st Group 2	4	4	0	14	4	9th ▲ Group 1
2011	GS	QF	SF	F	2	0	2	4	6	9th Group 1
2013	GS	QF	SF	F	4	2	2	7	11	SF; Group 1
2015	GS	QF	SF	F	2	0	2	2	8	9th Group 1
2017	GS	QF	SF	F	4	2	2	17	25	SF; Group 1
2019	GS	QF	SF	F	4	2	2	17	20	SF; Group 1
2021	GS	QF	SF	F	4	2	2	28	15	QF; Group 1
2023	GS	QF	SF	F	4	3	1	31	18	QF; Group 1
2025	GS	QF	SF	F	4	2	2	29	13	QF; Group 1
Total	18/18				59	29	30	209	190	SF
Edition	Group Stage	Quarter Finals	Semi Finals	Finals	Game Played	Won Match	Lost Match	Won Set	Lost Set	Result

=== Thomas Cup ===
Year	Round	Pos
1949	Did not enter	
1952	Did not qualify	
1955	Did not qualify	
1958	Third place	3rd
1961	Runners-up	2nd
1964	Third place	3rd
1967	Withdrew	
1970	Did not qualify	
1973	Final round inter-zone	3rd
1976	Final round inter-zone	3rd
1979	Did not qualify	
1982	Did not qualify	
1984	Did not qualify	
1986	Did not qualify	
1988	Did not qualify	
1990	Did not qualify	
1992	Group stage	8th
1994	Group stage	7th
1996	Did not qualify	
1998	Did not qualify	
2000	Did not qualify	
2002	Group stage	6th
2004	Quarter-finals	5th
2006	Did not qualify	
2008	Quarter-finals	5th
2010	Did not qualify	
2012	Did not qualify	
2014	Quarter-finals	5th
2016	Group stage	9th
2018	Group stage	9th
2020	Quarter-finals	6th
2022	Group stage	9th
2024	Group stage	9th
2026	Quarter-finals	6th

=== Uber Cup ===
Year	Result
1969	First round inter-zone (4th / 5th)
1994	Group Stage − 7th
2012	(bronze) Semifinalist
2014	Quarter-finalist
2016	Quarter-finalist
2018	(silver) Runner-up
2020	(bronze) Semi-finalist
2022	(bronze) Semi-finalist
2024	Quarter-finalist − 5th
2026	Quarter-finalist − 7th

== Participation in Asia Championships ==
Men's team

Year	Result
2016	Group stage
2018	Quarter-finalist
2020	Quarter-finalist
2022	Withdrew
2024	Group stage
2026	Quarter-finalist

Women's team

Year	Result
2016	(bronze) Semi-finalist
2018	Quarter-finalist
2020	(bronze) Semi-finalist
2022	Withdrew
2024	(silver) Runner-up
2026	Quarter-finalist

Mixed team

Year	Result
2017	(bronze) Semi-finalist
2019	Quarter-finalist
2023	(bronze) Semi-finalist
2025	(bronze) Semi-finalist

== Participation in Southeast Asian Games ==
Year	Men's	Women's
1965		Gold
1971		Gold
1973	Gold	Silver
1975	Gold	
1979	Bronze	Silver
1981	Bronze	Silver
1983	Bronze	Silver
1985	Bronze	Silver
1987	Bronze	Silver
1989	Bronze	Silver
1991	Bronze	Silver
1993	Bronze	Silver
1995	Bronze	Silver
1997	Bronze	Silver
1999	Bronze	Silver
2001	Bronze	Silver
2003	Silver	Silver
2005	Bronze	Gold
2007	Bronze	Bronze
2009	Bronze	Bronze
2011	Bronze	Gold
2015	Silver	Gold
2017	Bronze	Gold
2019	Bronze	Gold
2021	Gold	Gold
2023	Bronze	Gold
2025	Bronze	Gold

== Junior competitive record ==
=== World Junior Team Championships ===
==== Suhandinata Cup ====
Year	Result
(China) 2000	Group stage – 5th of 24
(South Africa) 2002	Fourth place
(Canada) 2004	Did not compete
(South Korea) 2006	Group Z2 – 7th of 28
(New Zealand) 2007	Group Y2 – 7th of 25
(India) 2008	Group W – 5th of 21
(Malaysia) 2009	(bronze) Third place
(Mexico) 2010	Group Y1 – 8th of 24
(Taiwan) 2011	Fourth place
(Japan) 2012	Quarter-finalist – 7th of 30
(Thailand) 2013	Quarter-finalist – 6th of 30
(Malaysia) 2014	(bronze) Semi-finalist
(Peru) 2015	Group C2 – 6th of 39
(Spain) 2016	(bronze) Semi-finalist
(Indonesia) 2017	Quarter-finalist – 7th of 44
(Canada) 2018	Group C – 9th of 39
(Russia) 2019	(bronze) Semi-finalist
(New Zealand) 2020	Cancelled
(China) 2021	Cancelled
(Spain) 2022	Group E – 17th of 37
(United States) 2023	Quarter-finalist – 8th of 38
(China) 2024	Group H – 9th of 39
(India) 2025	Group A – 9th of 36
(Egypt) 2026	(bronze) Semi-finalist

=== Asian Junior Team Championships ===
==== Women's team ====
Year	Result
2001	(bronze) Semi-finalist

==== Mixed team ====
Year	Round	Pos
2008	Quarter-finals	
2009	Semi-finals	3rd
2010	Semi-finals	3rd
2011	Quarter-finals	
2012	Quarter-finals	
2013	Quarter-finals	
2014	Quarter-finals	
2015	Quarter-finals	
2016	Semi-finals	3rd
2017	Quarter-finals	
2018	Quarter-finals	
2019	Champions	1st
2023	Semi-finals	3rd
2024	Group stage	12th
2025	Runners-up	2nd
2026	Semi-finals	3rd

== Players ==
=== Current squad ===
The following players were selected to represent Thailand in the 2026 Thomas & Uber Cup.

==== Thomas Cup ====
Name	DoB/Age	Ranking of event	
Name	DoB/Age	MS	MD
Kunlavut Vitidsarn	11 May 2001 (aged 24)	1	
Panitchaphon Teeraratsakul	11 November 2004 (aged 21)	27	
Puritat Arree	28 January 2003 (aged 23)	218	
Tanawat Yimjit	7 December 2004 (aged 21)	327	
Dechapol Puavaranukroh	20 May 1997 (aged 28)		24
Chaloempon Charoenkitamorn	15 April 1997 (aged 29)		55
Worrapol Thongsa-nga	29 October 1995 (aged 30)		55
Peeratchai Sukphun	31 August 2004 (aged 21)		72
Pakkapon Teeraratsakul	11 November 2004 (aged 21)		72
Ruttanapak Oupthong	12 April 2000 (aged 26)		

==== Uber Cup ====
Name	DoB/Age	Ranking of event	
Name	DoB/Age	WS	WD
Ratchanok Intanon	5 February 1995 (aged 31)	7	
Pornpawee Chochuwong	22 January 1998 (aged 28)	8	
Supanida Katethong	26 October 1997 (aged 28)	11	
Busanan Ongbamrungphan	22 March 1996 (aged 30)	17	
Ornnicha Jongsathapornparn	15 July 1999 (aged 26)		46
Hathaithip Mijad	12 September 2007 (aged 18)		49
Napapakorn Tungkasatan	2 October 2008 (aged 17)		49
Benyapa Aimsaard	29 August 2002 (aged 23)		87
Jhenicha Sudjaipraparat	18 February 1999 (aged 27)		631
Supissara Paewsampran	18 November 1999 (aged 26)		894

=== SEA Games ===
==== Men's ====
Name	DoB/Age	Ranking of event		
Name	DoB/Age	MS	MD	XD
Kunlavut Vitidsarn	24 May 2001 (aged 24)	3		
Panitchapon Teeraratsakul	11 November 2004 (aged 21)	38		
Kantaphon Wangcharoen	18 September 1998 (aged 27)	57		
Wongsup Wongsup-In	11 July 2005 (aged 20)	206		
Dechapol Puavaranukroh	20 May 1997 (aged 28)		14	3
Peeratchai Sukphun	31 August 2004 (aged 21)		46	
Pakkapon Teeraratsakul	31 August 2004 (aged 21)		46	65
Ruttanapak Oupthong	12 April 2004 (aged 21)			12
Supak Jomkoh	4 September 1996 (aged 29)			100

==== Women's ====
Name	DoB/Age	Ranking of event		
Name	DoB/Age	WS	WD	XD
Pornpawee Chochuwong	22 January 1998 (aged 27)	6		
Ratchanok Intanon	5 February 1995 (aged 30)	8		
Supanida Katethong	6 October 1997 (aged 28)	14		
Busanan Ongbamrungphan	22 March 1996 (aged 29)	15		
Sukitta Suwachai	2 November 2007 (aged 18)		49	
Ornnicha Jongsathapornparn	15 July 1999 (aged 26)		49	100
Supissara Paewsampran	18 November 1999 (aged 26)			3
Jhenicha Sudjaipraparat	18 February 1999 (aged 26)			12
Sapsiree Taerattanachai	18 April 1992 (aged 33)			65
Benyapa Aimsaard	29 August 2002 (aged 23)			77

=== Previous squads ===
- Sudirman Cup squads: 2015, 2017, 2019, 2021, 2023, 2025
- Thomas Cup squads: 2008, 2014, 2016, 2018, 2020, 2022, 2024, 2026
- Uber Cup squads: 2012, 2014, 2016, 2018, 2020, 2022, 2024, 2026
