= 1994 Thomas Cup group stage =

Badminton team Tournament in Jakarta

The 1994 Thomas Cup group stage was held at Istora Senayan in Jakarta, Indonesia, from 10 to 15 May 1994.

The group stage was first stage of the tournament where only the two highest-placing teams in each of the two groups advanced to the knockout stage.

== Draw ==
The original draw for the tournament was conducted on 5 March 1994 in London. The 8 teams will be drawn into two groups each containing four teams.

=== Group composition ===
Group
Group A	Group B
China; Finland; Indonesia (Host); Sweden	Denmark; England; Malaysia; Thailand

== Group A ==
Pos	Team	Pld	W	L	GF	GA	GD	PF	PA	PD	Pts	Qualification
1	Indonesia (H)	3	3	0	30	2	+28	479	205	+274	3	Advance to semi-finals
2	China	3	2	1	19	15	+4	414	363	+51	2	Advance to semi-finals
3	Sweden	3	1	2	13	20	−7	347	423	−76	1	
4	Finland	3	0	3	5	30	−25	252	501	−249	0	

Source: The Straits Times
(H) Host

=== Indonesia vs Finland ===
Indonesia
5
Istora Senayan
10 May 1994, 19:30 UTC+7

Finland
0

			1	2	3
1	(Indonesia) (Finland)	Joko Suprianto; Robert Liljequist	15; 3	15; 4
2	(Indonesia) (Finland)	Hariyanto Arbi; Jyri Aalto	15; 5	15; 7
3	(Indonesia) (Finland)	Rexy Mainaky / Ricky Subagja; Mikael Segercrantz / Tony Tuominen	15; 4	15; 5
4	(Indonesia) (Finland)	Ardy Wiranata; Lasse Lindelöf	15; 4	15; 5
5	(Indonesia) (Finland)	Rudy Gunawan / Bambang Suprianto; Jyri Aalto / Jari Eriksson	15; 1	15; 3

=== China vs Sweden ===
China
4
Istora Senayan
10 May 1994, 19:30 UTC+7

Sweden
1

			1	2	3
1	(China) (Sweden)	Liu Jun; Jens Olsson	15; 10	15; 12
2	(China) (Sweden)	Dong Jiong; Tomas Johansson	4; 15	15; 17
3	(China) (Sweden)	Huang Zhanzhong / Jiang Xin; Pär-Gunnar Jönsson / Rickard Magnusson	15; 7	15; 6
4	(China) (Sweden)	Sun Jun; Patrik Andreasson	15; 11	15; 11
5	(China) (Sweden)	Chen Hongyong / Chen Kang; Jan-Eric Antonsson / Mikael Rosén	15; 7	15; 11

=== China vs Finland ===
China
5
Istora Senayan
12 May 1994, 19:30 UTC+7

Finland
0

			1	2	3
1	(China) (Finland)	Dong Jiong; Robert Liljequist	8; 15	15; 5	15; 6
2	(China) (Finland)	Huang Zhanzhong / Jiang Xin; Jari Eriksson / Mikael Segercrantz	15; 2	15; 3
3	(China) (Finland)	Xie Yangchun; Lasse Lindelöf	15; 8	7; 15	15; 3
4	(China) (Finland)	Chen Hongyong / Chen Kang; Robert Liljequist / Tony Tuominen	15; 4	15; 5
5	(China) (Finland)	Sun Jun; Tony Tuominen	13; 15	15; 7	15; 2

=== Indonesia vs Sweden ===
Indonesia
5
Istora Senayan
12 May 1994, 19:30 UTC+7

Sweden
0

			1	2	3
1	(Indonesia) (Sweden)	Joko Suprianto; Jens Olsson	15; 7	15; 4
2	(Indonesia) (Sweden)	Rudy Gunawan / Bambang Suprianto; Jan-Eric Antonsson / Mikael Rosén	15; 10	15; 4
3	(Indonesia) (Sweden)	Ardy Wiranata; Tomas Johansson	15; 9	15; 9
4	(Indonesia) (Sweden)	Rexy Mainaky / Ricky Subagja; Pär-Gunnar Jönsson / Rickard Magnusson	15; 0	15; 3
5	(Indonesia) (Sweden)	Hermawan Susanto; Henrik Bengtsson	15; 4	13; 15	15; 2

=== Sweden vs Finland ===
Sweden
5
Istora Senayan
14 May 1994, 19:30 UTC+7

Finland
0

			1	2	3
1	(Sweden) (Finland)	Jens Olsson; Robert Liljequist	15; 5	12; 15	15; 9
2	(Sweden) (Finland)	Tomas Johansson; Jyri Aalto	15; 12	15; 10
3	(Sweden) (Finland)	Henrik Bengtsson; Lasse Lindelöf	11; 15	15; 10	15; 7
4	(Sweden) (Finland)	Jan-Eric Antonsson / Mikael Rosén; Jyri Aalto / Lasse Lindelöf	15; 10	15; 8
5	(Sweden) (Finland)	Pär-Gunnar Jönsson / Rickard Magnusson; Robert Liljequist / Tony Tuominen	15; 13	15; 7

=== Indonesia vs China ===
Indonesia
5
Istora Senayan
14 May 1994, 19:30 UTC+7

China
0

			1	2	3
1	(Indonesia) (China)	Joko Suprianto; Dong Jiong	11; 15	18; 16	15; 5
2	(Indonesia) (China)	Rudy Gunawan / Bambang Suprianto; Chen Hongyong / Chen Kang	17; 14	15; 12
3	(Indonesia) (China)	Hariyanto Arbi; Xie Yangchun	15; 5	15; 5
4	(Indonesia) (China)	Rexy Mainaky / Ricky Subagja; Jiang Xin / Yu Qi	15; 4	15; 7
5	(Indonesia) (China)	Ardy Wiranata; Sun Jun	15; 2	15; 12

== Group B ==
Pos	Team	Pld	W	L	GF	GA	GD	PF	PA	PD	Pts	Qualification
1	Malaysia	3	3	0	25	9	+16	464	324	+140	3	Advance to semi-finals
2	South Korea	3	2	1	20	16	+4	447	425	+22	2	Advance to semi-finals
3	Denmark	3	1	2	19	12	+7	409	393	+16	1	
4	Thailand	3	0	3	3	29	−26	282	461	−179	0	

Source: The Straits Times

=== Malaysia vs South Korea ===
Malaysia
3
Istora Senayan
11 May 1994, 19:30 UTC+7

South Korea
2

			1	2	3
1	(Malaysia) (South Korea)	Rashid Sidek; Kim Hak-kyun	18; 13	15; 8
2	(Malaysia) (South Korea)	Cheah Soon Kit / Soo Beng Kiang; Lee Gwang-jin / Lee Suk-ho	15; 3	15; 1
3	(Malaysia) (South Korea)	Ong Ewe Hock; Park Sung-woo	16; 18	15; 6	16; 18
4	(Malaysia) (South Korea)	Tan Kim Her / Yap Kim Hock; Kim Dong-moon / Yoo Yong-sung	15; 8	15; 12
5	(Malaysia) (South Korea)	Foo Kok Keong; Lee Gwang-jin	15; 12	4; 15	5; 15

=== Denmark vs Thailand ===
Denmark
5
Istora Senayan
11 May 1992, 19:30 UTC+7

Thailand
0

			1	2	3
1	(Denmark) (Thailand)	Thomas Stuer-Lauridsen; Sompol Kukasemkij	15; 4	15; 7
2	(Denmark) (Thailand)	Jon Holst-Christensen / Michael Søgaard; Siripong Siripool / Khunakorn Sudhisodhi	15; 9	15; 12
3	(Denmark) (Thailand)	Poul-Erik Høyer Larsen; Teeranun Chiangta	15; 11	15; 4
4	(Denmark) (Thailand)	Thomas Lund / Thomas Stuer-Lauridsen; Pramote Teerawiwatana / Sakrapee Thongsari	15; 10	15; 12
5	(Denmark) (Thailand)	Søren B. Nielsen; Vacharapan Khamthong	17; 14	15; 0

=== Malaysia vs Thailand ===
Malaysia
5
Istora Senayan
13 May 1994, 19:30 UTC+7

Thailand
0

			1	2	3
1	(Malaysia) (Thailand)	Rashid Sidek; Sompol Kukasemkij	15; 11	15; 7
2	(Malaysia) (Thailand)	Cheah Soon Kit / Soo Beng Kiang; Pramote Teerawiwatana / Sakrapee Thongsari	17; 14	15; 10
3	(Malaysia) (Thailand)	Ong Ewe Hock; Teeranun Chiangta	15; 9	15; 8
4	(Malaysia) (Thailand)	Tan Kim Her / Yap Kim Hock; Siripong Siripool / Khunakorn Sudhisodhi	15; 4	15; 10
5	(Malaysia) (Thailand)	Foo Kok Keong; Vacharapan Khamthong	15; 5	15; 6

=== Denmark vs South Korea ===
Denmark
2
Istora Senayan
13 May 1994, 19:30 UTC+7

South Korea
3

			1	2	3
1	(Denmark) (South Korea)	Poul-Erik Høyer Larsen; Kim Hak-kyun	9; 15	5; 15
2	(Denmark) (South Korea)	Thomas Lund / Thomas Stuer-Lauridsen; Kim Dong-moon / Lee Suk-ho	15; 13	16; 17	15; 12
3	(Denmark) (South Korea)	Peter Espersen; Park Sung-woo	10; 15	3; 15
4	(Denmark) (South Korea)	Jon Holst-Christensen / Michael Søgaard; Choi Ji-tae / Yoo Yong-sung	15; 9	15; 10
5	(Denmark) (South Korea)	Søren B. Nielsen; Lee Gwang-jin	15; 9	13; 15	15; 17

=== Denmark vs Malaysia ===
Denmark
1
Istora Senayan
15 May 1992, 19:30 UTC+7

Malaysia
4

			1	2	3
1	(Denmark) (Malaysia)	Thomas Stuer-Lauridsen; Rashid Sidek	3; 6			retired
2	(Denmark) (Malaysia)	Jon Holst-Christensen / Michael Søgaard; Cheah Soon Kit / Soo Beng Kiang	18; 14	15; 2
3	(Denmark) (Malaysia)	Poul-Erik Høyer Larsen; Ong Ewe Hock	15; 10	0; 15	9; 15
4	(Denmark) (Malaysia)	Jim Laugesen / Thomas Lund; Tan Kim Her / Yap Kim Hock	5; 15	17; 15	6; 15
5	(Denmark) (Malaysia)	Søren B. Nielsen; Foo Kok Keong	1; 15	15; 11	7; 15

=== South Korea vs Thailand ===
South Korea
4
Istora Senayan
15 May 1994, 19:30 UTC+7

Thailand
1

			1	2	3
1	(South Korea) (Thailand)	Kim Hak-kyun; Sompol Kukasemkij	15; 9	15; 3
2	(South Korea) (Thailand)	Lee Gwang-jin / Lee Suk-ho; Pramote Teerawiwatana / Sakrapee Thongsari	15; 9	6; 15	0; 15
3	(South Korea) (Thailand)	Park Sung-woo; Kitipon Kitikul	15; 7	15; 8
4	(South Korea) (Thailand)	Kim Dong-moon / Yoo Yong-sung; Siripong Siripool / Khunakorn Sudhisodhi	15; 6	15; 18	15; 8
5	(South Korea) (Thailand)	Ahn Jae-chang; Teeranun Chiangta	15; 10	15; 7
