= 1994 Uber Cup group stage =

Badminton team Tournament in Jakarta

The 1994 Uber Cup group stage was held at Istora Senayan in Jakarta, Indonesia, from 10 to 15 May 1994.

The group stage was the first stage of the tournament where only the two highest-placing teams in each of the two groups advanced to the knockout stage.

== Draw ==
The original draw for the tournament was conducted on 5 March 1994 in London. The 8 teams will be drawn into two groups each containing four teams.

=== Group composition ===
Group
Group A	Group B
China; Japan; South Korea; Russia	Denmark; Indonesia (Host); Sweden; Thailand

== Group A ==
Pos	Team	Pld	W	L	GF	GA	GD	PF	PA	PD	Pts	Qualification
1	China	3	3	0	26	9	+17	389	280	+109	3	Advance to semi-finals
2	South Korea	3	2	1	26	7	+19	404	234	+170	2	Advance to semi-finals
3	Japan	3	1	2	14	20	−6	290	336	−46	1	
4	Russia	3	0	3	1	30	−29	140	374	−234	0	

Source: The Straits Times

=== China vs Russia ===
China
5
Istora Senayan
10 May 1994, 19:30 UTC+7

Russia
0

			1	2	3
1	(China) (Russia)	Ye Zhaoying; Marina Andrievskaya	11; 3	11; 8
2	(China) (Russia)	Han Jingna; Irina Yakusheva	11; 3	11; 2
3	(China) (Russia)	Ge Fei / Gu Jun; Svetlana Alferova / Marina Yakusheva	15; 5	15; 4
4	(China) (Russia)	Zhang Ning; Elena Denisova	11; 6	11; 0
5	(China) (Russia)	Chen Ying / Wu Yuhong; Nadezhda Chervyakova / Irina Yakusheva	15; 10	9; 5		retired

=== South Korea vs Japan ===
South Korea
5
Istora Senayan
10 May 1994, 19:30 UTC+7

Japan
0

			1	2	3
1	(South Korea) (Japan)	Bang Soo-hyun; Hisako Mizui	11; 5	11; 2
2	(South Korea) (Japan)	Kim Ji-hyun; Takako Ida	11; 5	11; 4
3	(South Korea) (Japan)	Chung So-young / Gil Young-ah; Tomomi Matsuo / Kyoko Sasage	16; 17	15; 10	15; 3
4	(South Korea) (Japan)	Ra Kyung-min; Yasuko Mizui	11; 3	11; 1
5	(South Korea) (Japan)	Jang Hye-ock / Shim Eun-jung; Tokiko Hirota / Senobu Sasaki	15; 12	15; 2

=== South Korea vs Russia ===
South Korea
5
Istora Senayan
12 May 1994, 19:30 UTC+7

Russia
0

			1	2	3
1	(South Korea) (Russia)	Bang Soo-hyun; Marina Andrievskaya	11; 0	11; 0
2	(South Korea) (Russia)	Ra Kyung-min; Marina Yakusheva	11; 1	11; 5
3	(South Korea) (Russia)	Lee Joo-hyun; Irina Yakusheva	11; 4	11; 1
4	(South Korea) (Russia)	Chung So-young / Gil Young-ah; Marina Andrievskaya / Marina Yakusheva	15; 4	15; 12
5	(South Korea) (Russia)	Jang Hye-ock / Shim Eun-jung; Svetlana Alferova / Irina Yakusheva	15; 7	15; 2

=== China vs Japan ===
China
4
Istora Senayan
12 May 1994, 19:30 UTC+7

Japan
1

			1	2	3
1	(China) (Japan)	Ye Zhaoying; Hisako Mizui	11; 7	11; 7
2	(China) (Japan)	Chen Ying / Wu Yuhong; Tomomi Matsuo / Kyoko Sasage	15; 8	12; 15	15; 7
3	(China) (Japan)	Han Jingna; Takako Ida	11; 1	11; 7
4	(China) (Japan)	Ge Fei / Gu Jun; Tokiko Hirota / Yuko Koike	3; 15	15; 3	7; 15
5	(China) (Japan)	Liu Yuhong; Yasuko Mizui	12; 9	11; 3

=== China vs South Korea ===
China
3
Istora Senayan
14 May 1994, 19:30 UTC+7

South Korea
2

			1	2	3
1	(China) (South Korea)	Ye Zhaoying; Bang Soo-hyun	9; 12	12; 10	12; 9
2	(China) (South Korea)	Han Jingna; Kim Ji-hyun	11; 6	11; 8
3	(China) (South Korea)	Liu Yuhong; Ra Kyung-min	8; 11	11; 5	6; 11
4	(China) (South Korea)	Chen Ying / Wu Yuhong; Chung So-young / Jang Hye-ock	14; 17	8; 15
5	(China) (South Korea)	Ge Fei / Gu Jun; Gil Young-ah / Shim Eun-jung	2; 15	15; 6	15; 13

=== Japan vs Russia ===
Japan
5
Istora Senayan
14 May 1994, 19:30 UTC+7

Russia
0

			1	2	3
1	(Japan) (Russia)	Hisako Mizui; Marina Andrievskaya	11; 8	11; 3
2	(Japan) (Russia)	Takako Ida; Marina Yakusheva	11; 6	3; 11	11; 3
3	(Japan) (Russia)	Yasuko Mizui; Irina Yakusheva	11; 2	11; 5
4	(Japan) (Russia)	Tomomi Matsuo / Kyoko Sasage; Marina Andrievskaya / Marina Yakusheva	15; 1	15; 12
5	(Japan) (Russia)	Tokiko Hirota / Yuko Koike; Svetlana Alferova / Irina Yakusheva	15; 4	15; 3

== Group B ==
Pos	Team	Pld	W	L	GF	GA	GD	PF	PA	PD	Pts	Qualification
1	Indonesia (H)	3	3	0	27	5	+22	392	170	+222	3	Advance to semi-finals
2	Sweden	3	2	1	14	23	−9	336	394	−58	2	Advance to semi-finals
3	Denmark	3	1	2	22	15	+7	376	357	+19	1	
4	Thailand	3	0	3	7	27	−20	224	407	−183	0	

Source: The Straits Times
(H) Host

=== Indonesia vs Thailand ===
Indonesia
5
Istora Senayan
11 May 1994, 19:30 UTC+7

Thailand
0

			1	2	3
1	(Indonesia) (Thailand)	Susi Susanti; Somharuthai Jaroensiri	11; 2	11; 3
2	(Indonesia) (Thailand)	Yuni Kartika; Pornsawan Plungwech	11; 8	11; 4
3	(Indonesia) (Thailand)	Eliza Nathanael / Zelin Resiana; Somharuthai Jaroensiri / Piyathip Sansaniyakulvilai	15; 5	15; 1
4	(Indonesia) (Thailand)	Yuliani Santosa; Sujitra Ekmongkolpaisarn	11; 0	11; 4
5	(Indonesia) (Thailand)	Finarsih / Lili Tampi; Plernta Boonyarit / Pornsawan Plungwech	15; 4	15; 3

=== Denmark vs Sweden ===
Denmark
2
Istora Senayan
11 May 1994, 19:30 UTC+7

Sweden
3

			1	2	3
1	(Denmark) (Sweden)	Camilla Martin; Lim Xiaoqing	8; 11	11; 5	12; 11
2	(Denmark) (Sweden)	Pernille Nedergaard; Catrine Bengtsson	12; 9	3; 11	9; 12
3	(Denmark) (Sweden)	Mette Pedersen; Christine Magnusson	11; 6	1; 11	7; 11
4	(Denmark) (Sweden)	Anne Mette Bille / Marlene Thomsen; Catrine Bengtsson / Maria Bengtsson	9; 15	15; 10	16; 17
5	(Denmark) (Sweden)	Lotte Olsen / Lisbet Stuer-Lauridsen; Lim Xiaoqing / Christine Magnusson	18; 15	15; 4

=== Denmark vs Thailand ===
Denmark
5
Istora Senayan
13 May 1994, 19:30 UTC+7

Thailand
0

			1	2	3
1	(Denmark) (Thailand)	Camilla Martin; Somharuthai Jaroensiri	11; 3	11; 6
2	(Denmark) (Thailand)	Pernille Nedergaard; Pornsawan Plungwech	11; 8	11; 1
3	(Denmark) (Thailand)	Mette Pedersen; Sujitra Ekmongkolpaisarn	7; 11	11; 7	12; 9
4	(Denmark) (Thailand)	Lotte Olsen / Lisbet Stuer-Lauridsen; Plernta Boonyarit / Pornsawan Plungwech	15; 8	15; 2
5	(Denmark) (Thailand)	Anne Mette Bille / Marlene Thomsen; Somharuthai Jaroensiri / Piyathip Sansaniyakulvilai	15; 8	15; 9

=== Indonesia vs Sweden ===
Indonesia
5
Istora Senayan
13 May 1994, 19:30 UTC+7

Sweden
0

			1	2	3
1	(Indonesia) (Sweden)	Susi Susanti; Catrine Bengtsson	11; 2	11; 0
2	(Indonesia) (Sweden)	Yuni Kartika; Karolina Ericsson	11; 1	11; 0
3	(Indonesia) (Sweden)	Yuliani Santosa; Kristin Nilsson	11; 4	11; 2
4	(Indonesia) (Sweden)	Finarsih / Lili Tampi; Lim Xiaoqing / Christine Magnusson	18; 14	15; 4
5	(Indonesia) (Sweden)	Eliza Nathanael / Zelin Resiana; Maria Bengtsson / Karolina Ericsson	15; 6	15; 8

=== Indonesia vs Denmark ===
Indonesia
3
Istora Senayan
15 May 1994, 19:30 UTC+7

Denmark
2

			1	2	3
1	(Indonesia) (Denmark)	Yuni Kartika; Camilla Martin	1; 11	12; 9	6; 11
2	(Indonesia) (Denmark)	Eliza Nathanael / Zelin Resiana; Lotte Olsen / Lisbet Stuer-Lauridsen	15; 10	14; 18	15; 9
3	(Indonesia) (Denmark)	Yuliani Santosa; Pernille Nedergaard	11; 4	11; 2
4	(Indonesia) (Denmark)	Susi Susanti / Rosiana Tendean; Anne Mette Bille / Marlene Thomsen	8; 15	9; 15
5	(Indonesia) (Denmark)	Mia Audina; Lotte Thomsen	11; 0	11; 4

=== Sweden vs Thailand ===
Sweden
3
Istora Senayan
15 May 1994, 19:30 UTC+7

Thailand
2

			1	2	3
1	(Sweden) (Thailand)	Lim Xiaoqing; Somharuthai Jaroensiri	5; 11	11; 6	5; 11
2	(Sweden) (Thailand)	Catrine Bengtsson; Pornsawan Plungwech	11; 12	7; 11
3	(Sweden) (Thailand)	Christine Magnusson; Sujitra Ekmongkolpaisarn	12; 10	10; 12	11; 7
4	(Sweden) (Thailand)	Catrine Bengtsson / Maria Bengtsson; Somharuthai Jaroensiri / Piyathip Sansaniyakulvilai	15; 18	15; 6	15; 11
5	(Sweden) (Thailand)	Lim Xiaoqing / Christine Magnusson; Plernta Boonyarit / Pornsawan Plungwech	15; 0	15; 3
