= 1994 Thomas Cup knockout stage =

1994 Knockout stage of the Thomas Cup badminton team championship

The knockout stage for the 1994 Thomas Cup in Jakarta, Indonesia began on 17 May 1994 with the semi-finals and ended on 21 May 1994 with the final.

== Qualified teams ==
The top two placed teams from each of the two groups qualified for this stage.

Group	Winners	Runners-up
A	Indonesia	China
B	Malaysia	South Korea

== Bracket ==
Semi-finals
Indonesia	4
South Korea	1
China	1
Malaysia	4

Final
Indonesia	3
Malaysia	0

== Semi-finals ==
=== Semi-final 1 ===
Indonesia
4
Istora Senayan
17 May 1994, 19:30 UTC+7

South Korea
1

			1	2	3
1	(Indonesia) (South Korea)	Joko Suprianto; Kim Hak-kyun	15; 12	15; 5
2	(Indonesia) (South Korea)	Rudy Gunawan / Bambang Suprianto; Kim Dong-moon / Yoo Yong-sung	12; 15	15; 5	15; 10
3	(Indonesia) (South Korea)	Hariyanto Arbi; Park Sung-woo	16; 17	1; 15
4	(Indonesia) (South Korea)	Rexy Mainaky / Ricky Subagja; Choi Ji-tae / Lee Gwang-jin	15; 1	15; 2
5	(Indonesia) (South Korea)	Hermawan Susanto; Ahn Jae-chang	15; 4	15; 1

=== Semi-final 2 ===
China
1
Istora Senayan
18 May 1994, 19:30 UTC+7

Malaysia
4

			1	2	3
1	(China) (Malaysia)	Liu Jun; Rashid Sidek	16; 18	15; 12	2; 15
2	(China) (Malaysia)	Chen Hongyong / Chen Kang; Cheah Soon Kit / Soo Beng Kiang	17; 15	6; 15	6; 15
3	(China) (Malaysia)	Dong Jiong; Ong Ewe Hock	11; 15	6; 15
4	(China) (Malaysia)	Jiang Xin / Huang Zhanzhong; Tan Kim Her / Yap Kim Hock	8; 15	10; 15
5	(China) (Malaysia)	Sun Jun; Foo Kok Keong	15; 12	15; 8

== Final ==
Indonesia
3
Istora Senayan
21 May 1994, 19:30 UTC+7

Malaysia
0

			1	2	3
1	(Indonesia) (Malaysia)	Hariyanto Arbi; Rashid Sidek	15; 6	15; 11
2	(Indonesia) (Malaysia)	Rudy Gunawan / Bambang Suprianto; Cheah Soon Kit / Soo Beng Kiang	15; 10	6; 15	15; 8
3	(Indonesia) (Malaysia)	Ardy Wiranata; Ong Ewe Hock	15; 11	15; 5
4	(Indonesia) (Malaysia)	Rexy Mainaky / Ricky Subagja; Tan Kim Her / Yap Kim Hock				not played
5	(Indonesia) (Malaysia)	Hermawan Susanto; Foo Kok Keong				not played
