= 1994 Thomas & Uber Cup =

Biennial international badminton team championship

1994 Thomas & Uber Cup Piala Thomas dan Uber 1994

Tournament details
- Dates: 10–21 May 1994
- Edition: 18th (Thomas Cup); 15th (Uber Cup)
- Level: International
- Nations: 8 (Thomas Cup); 8 (Uber Cup)
- Venue: Istora Senayan
- Location: Jakarta, Indonesia
- Official website: bwfthomasubercups.com

The 1994 Thomas & Uber Cup was the 18th tournament of the Thomas Cup, and the 15th tournament of the Uber Cup, which are the major international team competitions in world badminton.

Malaysia were the defending champions for the Thomas Cup while China were the defending champions of the Uber Cup. The tournament was held at Istora Senayan in Jakarta.

== Host selection ==
Jakarta was named as the host in April 1993. Indonesia had previously bid to host the 1992 Thomas & Uber Cup. While Malaysia was named host in 1992, Indonesia won the right to host the tournament in 1994.

== Qualification ==
Indonesia qualified automatically as hosts. Malaysia qualified as title holders of the Thomas Cup while China qualified as the title holder of the Uber Cup.

=== Thomas Cup ===
Means of qualification	Date	Venue	Slot	Qualified teams
Host country	11 April 1993	Jakarta	1	Indonesia
1992 Thomas Cup	5 – 16 May 1992	Kuala Lumpur	1	Malaysia
European Zone	20 – 27 February 1994	Glasgow	3	Denmark
European Zone	20 – 27 February 1994	Glasgow	3	Finland
European Zone	20 – 27 February 1994	Glasgow	3	Sweden
Asian Zone	20 – 27 February 1994	Singapore	3	China
Asian Zone	20 – 27 February 1994	Singapore	3	South Korea
Asian Zone	20 – 27 February 1994	Singapore	3	Thailand
Total			8	

=== Uber Cup ===
Means of qualification	Date	Venue	Slot	Qualified teams
Host country	11 April 1993	Jakarta	1	Indonesia
1992 Uber Cup	5 – 16 May 1992	Kuala Lumpur	1	China
European Zone	20 – 27 February 1994	Glasgow	3	Denmark
European Zone	20 – 27 February 1994	Glasgow	3	Russia
European Zone	20 – 27 February 1994	Glasgow	3	Sweden
Asian Zone	20 – 27 February 1994	Singapore	3	Japan
Asian Zone	20 – 27 February 1994	Singapore	3	South Korea
Asian Zone	20 – 27 February 1994	Singapore	3	Thailand
Total			8	

== Medal summary ==
=== Medalists ===
Event	Gold	Silver	Bronze
Thomas Cup	Indonesia	Malaysia	South Korea
Thomas Cup	Indonesia	Malaysia	China
Uber Cup	Indonesia	China	South Korea
Uber Cup	Indonesia	China	Sweden

=== Medal table ===
* Host nation (Indonesia)

Rank	Nation	Gold	Silver	Bronze	Total
1	Indonesia*	2	0	0	2
2	China	0	1	1	2
3	Malaysia	0	1	0	1
4	South Korea	0	0	2	2
5	Sweden	0	0	1	1
Totals (5 entries)		2	2	4	8

== Thomas Cup ==
=== Group stage ===
==== Group A ====
Pos	Team	Pld	W	L	GF	GA	GD	PF	PA	PD	Pts	Qualification
1	Indonesia (H)	3	3	0	30	2	+28	479	205	+274	3	Advance to semi-finals
2	China	3	2	1	19	15	+4	414	363	+51	2	Advance to semi-finals
3	Sweden	3	1	2	13	20	−7	347	423	−76	1	
4	Finland	3	0	3	5	30	−25	252	501	−249	0	

Source: The Straits Times
(H) Host

10 May 1994
19:30 UTC+7

Indonesia	5–0	Finland
Report

Istora Senayan, Jakarta

10 May 1994
19:30 UTC+7

China	4–1	Sweden
Report

Istora Senayan, Jakarta

12 May 1994
19:30 UTC+7

China	5–0	Finland
Report

Istora Senayan, Jakarta

12 May 1994
19:30 UTC+7

Indonesia	5–0	Sweden
Report

Istora Senayan, Jakarta

14 May 1994
19:30 UTC+7

Sweden	5–0	Finland
Report

Istora Senayan, Jakarta

14 May 1994
19:30 UTC+7

Indonesia	5–0	China
Report

Istora Senayan, Jakarta

==== Group B ====
Pos	Team	Pld	W	L	GF	GA	GD	PF	PA	PD	Pts	Qualification
1	Malaysia	3	3	0	25	9	+16	464	324	+140	3	Advance to semi-finals
2	South Korea	3	2	1	20	16	+4	447	425	+22	2	Advance to semi-finals
3	Denmark	3	1	2	19	12	+7	409	393	+16	1	
4	Thailand	3	0	3	3	29	−26	282	461	−179	0	

Source: The Straits Times

11 May 1994
19:30 UTC+7

Malaysia	3–2	South Korea
Report

Istora Senayan, Jakarta

11 May 1994
19:30 UTC+7

Denmark	5–0	Thailand
Report

Istora Senayan, Jakarta

13 May 1994
19:30 UTC+7

Malaysia	5–0	Thailand
Report

Istora Senayan, Jakarta

13 May 1994
19:30 UTC+7

Denmark	2–3	South Korea
Report

Istora Senayan, Jakarta

15 May 1994
19:30 UTC+7

Denmark	1–4	Malaysia
Report

Istora Senayan, Jakarta

15 May 1994
19:30 UTC+7

South Korea	4–1	Thailand
Report

Istora Senayan, Jakarta

=== Knockout stage ===
==== Bracket ====
Semi-finals
Indonesia	4
South Korea	1
China	1
Malaysia	4

Final
Indonesia	3
Malaysia	0

==== Semi-finals ====
17 May 1994
19:30 UTC+7

Indonesia	4–1	South Korea
Report

Istora Senayan, Jakarta

18 May 1994
19:30 UTC+7

China	1–4	Malaysia
Report

Istora Senayan, Jakarta

==== Final ====
The final of the 1994 Thomas Cup was played on 21 May 1994 between hosts Indonesia and defending champions Malaysia. It was the sixth meeting between the two nations in the Thomas Cup final. Hariyanto Arbi gave Indonesia a 1–0 lead when he defeated Rashid Sidek 15–6, 15–11. Rudy Gunawan and Bambang Suprianto expanded the lead after defeating Malaysia's Cheah Soon Kit and Soo Beng Kiang in three games. In the third match, Olympic silver medalist Ardy Wiranata defeated Ong Ewe Hock 15–11, 15–5. The next two matches were halted by umpire Roger Johansson due to the crowd in the stadium being too distracting and noisy for the Malaysians. This marked Indonesia's ninth win at the Thomas Cup and their first win since 1984.

21 May 1994
19:30 UTC+7

Indonesia	3–0	Malaysia
Report

Istora Senayan, Jakarta

1994 Thomas Cup winner

Indonesia
Ninth title

== Uber Cup ==
=== Group stage ===
==== Group A ====
Pos	Team	Pld	W	L	GF	GA	GD	PF	PA	PD	Pts	Qualification
1	China	3	3	0	26	9	+17	389	280	+109	3	Advance to semi-finals
2	South Korea	3	2	1	26	7	+19	404	234	+170	2	Advance to semi-finals
3	Japan	3	1	2	14	20	−6	290	336	−46	1	
4	Russia	3	0	3	1	30	−29	140	374	−234	0	

Source: The Straits Times

10 May 1994
19:30 UTC+7

China	5–0	Russia
Report

Istora Senayan, Jakarta

10 May 1994
19:30 UTC+7

South Korea	5–0	Japan
Report

Istora Senayan, Jakarta

12 May 1994
19:30 UTC+7

South Korea	5–0	Russia
Report

Istora Senayan, Jakarta

12 May 1994
19:30 UTC+7

China	4–1	Japan
Report

Istora Senayan, Jakarta

14 May 1994
19:30 UTC+7

China	3–2	South Korea
Report

Istora Senayan, Jakarta

14 May 1994
19:30 UTC+7

Japan	5–0	Russia
Report

Istora Senayan, Jakarta

==== Group B ====
Pos	Team	Pld	W	L	GF	GA	GD	PF	PA	PD	Pts	Qualification
1	Indonesia (H)	3	3	0	27	5	+22	392	170	+222	3	Advance to semi-finals
2	Sweden	3	2	1	14	23	−9	336	394	−58	2	Advance to semi-finals
3	Denmark	3	1	2	22	15	+7	376	357	+19	1	
4	Thailand	3	0	3	7	27	−20	224	407	−183	0	

Source: The Straits Times
(H) Host

11 May 1994
19:30 UTC+7

Indonesia	5–0	Thailand
Report

Istora Senayan, Jakarta

11 May 1994
19:30 UTC+7

Denmark	2–3	Sweden
Report

Istora Senayan, Jakarta

13 May 1994
19:30 UTC+7

Denmark	5–0	Thailand
Report

Istora Senayan, Jakarta

13 May 1994
19:30 UTC+7

Indonesia	5–0	Sweden
Report

Istora Senayan, Jakarta

15 May 1994
19:30 UTC+7

Indonesia	3–2	Denmark
Report

Istora Senayan, Jakarta

15 May 1994
19:30 UTC+7

Sweden	3–2	Thailand
Report

Istora Senayan, Jakarta

=== Knockout stage ===
==== Bracket ====
Semi-finals
China	3
Sweden	2
South Korea	1
Indonesia	4

Final
China	2
Indonesia	3

==== Semi-finals ====
17 May 1994
19:30 UTC+7

China	3–2	Sweden
Report

Istora Senayan, Jakarta

18 May 1994
19:30 UTC+7

South Korea	1–4	Indonesia
Report

Istora Senayan, Jakarta

==== Final ====
The final of the 1994 Uber Cup was played on 20 May 1994. Indonesia reached the final after winning 4–1 against South Korea while China had to overcome a grueling battle against Sweden in the semi-finals. The first match went the hosts way with Susi Susanti defeating Ye Zhaoying. In the second match, Finarsih and Lili Tampi defeated Chen Ying and Wu Yuhong 15–13, 17–16. China then won the next two matches and made the score 2–2. In the final deciding match, 14 year-old Mia Audina won against Zhang Ning 11–7, 10–12, 11–4 to help the host clinch the title. This marked Indonesia's second win at the Uber Cup and their first win since 1975.

20 May 1994
19:30 UTC+7

Indonesia	3–2	China
Report

Istora Senayan, Jakarta

1994 Uber Cup winner

Indonesia
Second title
