= 1994 Uber Cup knockout stage =

1994 Knockout stage of the Thomas Cup badminton team championship

The knockout stage for the 1994 Uber Cup in Jakarta, Indonesia began on 17 May 1994 with the semi-finals and ended on 20 May 1994 with the final.

== Qualified teams ==
The top two placed teams from each of the two groups qualified for this stage.

Group	Winners	Runners-up
A	China	South Korea
B	Indonesia	Sweden

== Bracket ==
Semi-finals
China	3
Sweden	2
South Korea	1
Indonesia	4

Final
China	2
Indonesia	3

== Semi-finals ==
=== Semi-final 1 ===
China
3
Istora Senayan
17 May 1994, 19:30 UTC+7

Sweden
2

			1	2	3
1	(China) (Sweden)	Ye Zhaoying; Lim Xiaoqing	8; 11	12; 9	11; 1
2	(China) (Sweden)	Han Jingna; Catrine Bengtsson	11; 8	12; 10
3	(China) (Sweden)	Liu Yuhong; Christine Magnusson	12; 10	3; 11	4; 11
4	(China) (Sweden)	Ge Fei / Gu Jun; Maria Bengtsson / Catrine Bengtsson	11; 15	15; 12	15; 11
5	(China) (Sweden)	Chen Ying / Wu Yuhong; Lim Xiaoqing / Christine Magnusson	15; 9	12; 15	8; 15

=== Semi-final 2 ===
South Korea
1
Istora Senayan
18 May 1994, 19:30 UTC+7

Indonesia
4

			1	2	3
1	(South Korea) (Indonesia)	Kim Ji-hyun; Susi Susanti	4; 11	2; 11
2	(South Korea) (Indonesia)	Shim Eun-jung / Jang Hye-ock; Finarsih / Lili Tampi	9; 15	5; 15
3	(South Korea) (Indonesia)	Ra Kyung-min; Yuliani Santosa	3; 11	9; 12
4	(South Korea) (Indonesia)	Gil Young-ah / Bang Soo-hyun; Eliza Nathanael / Zelin Resiana	15; 2	2; 15	18; 15
5	(South Korea) (Indonesia)	Lee Joo-hyun; Mia Audina	11; 9	2; 11	6; 11

== Final ==
Indonesia
3
Istora Senayan
20 May 1994, 19:30 UTC+7

China
2

			1	2	3
1	(Indonesia) (China)	Susi Susanti; Ye Zhaoying	11; 4	12; 10
2	(Indonesia) (China)	Finarsih / Lili Tampi; Chen Ying / Wu Yuhong	15; 13	17; 16
3	(Indonesia) (China)	Yuliani Santosa; Han Jingna	5; 11	5; 11
4	(Indonesia) (China)	Eliza Nathanael / Zelin Resiana; Ge Fei / Gu Jun	10; 15	8; 15
5	(Indonesia) (China)	Mia Audina; Zhang Ning	11; 7	10; 12	11; 4
