= 2025 Sudirman Cup squads =

List of badminton teams in the Sudirman Cup

This article lists the confirmed squads for badminton's 2025 Sudirman Cup. The rankings given and used to determine the order for each event are based on the BWF World Ranking as of 18 February 2025.

== Group A ==
=== Algeria ===
7 players will represent Algeria.

Name	Age	Ranking of event				
Name	Age	MS	WS	MD	WD	XD
Mohamed Abderrahime Belarbi	8 August 1992 (aged 32)	325		164		375
Halla Bouksani	30 July 2000 (aged 24)		296		185	809
Yasmina Chibah	23 November 1999 (aged 25)		288		162	689
Adel Hamek	25 October 1992 (aged 32)	192		164		809
Koceila Mammeri	23 February 1999 (aged 26)			60		45
Tanina Mammeri	17 June 2003 (aged 21)				185	45
Linda Mazri	21 December 2001 (aged 23)		449		162	375

=== China ===
20 players will represent China.

Name	Age	Ranking of event				
Name	Age	MS	WS	MD	WD	XD
Chen Boyang	6 May 2000 (aged 24)			11		
Chen Qingchen	23 June 1997 (aged 27)				7	
Chen Yufei	1 March 1998 (aged 27)		7			
Feng Yanzhe	13 February 2001 (aged 24)					2
Guo Xinwa	6 January 2000 (aged 25)					6
Han Yue	18 November 1999 (aged 25)		3			
Huang Dongping	20 January 1995 (aged 30)					2
Jia Yifan	29 June 1997 (aged 27)				7	
Jiang Zhenbang	28 May 2001 (aged 23)					1
Li Shifeng	9 January 2000 (aged 25)	5				
Liang Weikeng	30 November 2000 (aged 24)			3		
Liu Shengshu	8 April 2004 (aged 21)				1	
Liu Yi	7 July 2003 (aged 21)			11		
Shi Yuqi	28 February 1996 (aged 29)	1				
Tan Ning	3 April 2003 (aged 22)				1	
Wang Chang	7 May 2001 (aged 23)			3		
Wang Zhiyi	29 April 2000 (aged 24)		2			
Wei Yaxin	18 April 2000 (aged 25)					1
Weng Hongyang	18 June 1999 (aged 25)	12				
Zhang Shuxian	2 January 2000 (aged 25)				13	

=== Hong Kong ===
17 players will represent Hong Kong.

Name	Age	Ranking of event				
Name	Age	MS	WS	MD	WD	XD
Fu Chi Yan	1 April 2003 (aged 22)				477	58
Hung Kuei Chun	15 September 2003 (aged 21)			127		112
Law Cheuk Him	26 June 1994 (aged 30)			120		
Lee Cheuk Yiu	28 August 1996 (aged 28)	21				
Lee Chun Hei	25 January 1994 (aged 31)			493		33
Lo Sin Yan	25 February 2003 (aged 22)		51			
Lui Chun Wai	25 January 1994 (aged 31)			127		58
Lui Lok Lok	22 September 2002 (aged 22)				39	143
Saloni Samirbhai Mehta	27 August 2002 (aged 22)		90			
Ng Ka Long	24 June 1994 (aged 30)	20				
Ng Tsz Yau	24 April 1998 (aged 27)					33
Tang Chun Man	20 March 1995 (aged 30)			996		5
Tsang Hiu Yan	22 February 2002 (aged 23)				39	112
Tse Ying Suet	9 November 1991 (aged 33)					9
Yeung Nga Ting	13 October 1998 (aged 26)				13	
Yeung Pui Lam	26 October 2001 (aged 23)				13	
Yeung Shing Choi	21 March 1996 (aged 29)			120		143

=== Thailand ===
19 players will represent Thailand.

Name	Age	Ranking of event				
Name	Age	MS	WS	MD	WD	XD
Benyapa Aimsaard	29 August 2002 (aged 22)				24	
Nuntakarn Aimsaard	23 May 1999 (aged 25)				24	
Pornpawee Chochuwong	22 January 1998 (aged 27)		6			
Ratchanok Intanon	5 February 1995 (aged 30)		9			
Supak Jomkoh	4 September 1996 (aged 28)			41		44
Laksika Kanlaha	17 December 1997 (aged 27)				16	
Supanida Katethong	26 October 1997 (aged 27)		8			
Kittinupong Kedren	19 July 1996 (aged 28)			35		
Phataimas Muenwong	5 June 1995 (aged 29)				16	21
Ruttanapak Oupthong	12 April 2000 (aged 25)					17
Supissara Paewsampran	18 November 1999 (aged 25)					13
Dechapol Puavaranukroh	20 May 1997 (aged 27)			35		13
Jhenicha Sudjaipraparat	18 February 1999 (aged 26)				459	17
Peeratchai Sukphun	31 August 2004 (aged 20)			28		
Sapsiree Taerattanachai	18 April 1992 (aged 33)					38
Pakkapon Teeraratsakul	11 November 2004 (aged 20)			28		21
Panitchaphon Teeraratsakul	11 November 2004 (aged 20)	48				
Kunlavut Vitidsarn	11 May 2001 (aged 23)	5				
Kantaphon Wangcharoen	18 September 1998 (aged 26)	40				

== Group B ==
=== Chinese Taipei ===
16 players will represent Chinese Taipei.

Name	Age	Ranking of event				
Name	Age	MS	WS	MD	WD	XD
Chang Ching-hui	17 May 1996 (aged 28)				17	
Chen Cheng-kuan	15 October 2003 (aged 21)			71		19
Chiu Hsiang-chieh	11 November 2002 (aged 22)			20		167
Chiu Pin-chian	19 May 1999 (aged 25)		26			
Chou Tien-chen	8 January 1990 (aged 35)	8				
Hsieh Pei-shan	22 November 1997 (aged 27)				13	
Hsu Wen-chi	28 September 1997 (aged 27)		24			
Hsu Yin-hui	18 March 2003 (aged 22)				21	19
Hu Ling-fang	6 April 1998 (aged 27)				29	8
Hung En-tzu	6 July 2001 (aged 23)				13	28
Lee Jhe-huei	20 March 1994 (aged 31)			12		
Lin Chun-yi	2 October 1999 (aged 25)	11				
Wang Chi-lin	18 January 1995 (aged 30)			20		193
Yang Ching-tun	17 November 1995 (aged 29)				17	126
Yang Po-hsuan	23 August 1996 (aged 28)			12		8
Ye Hong-wei	1 November 1999 (aged 25)					30

=== Canada ===
14 players will represent Canada.

Name	Age	Ranking of event				
Name	Age	MS	WS	MD	WD	XD
Jacqueline Cheung	18 October 2002 (aged 22)				77	385
Catherine Choi	1 May 2001 (aged 23)		881		77	
Jackie Dent	27 June 2005 (aged 19)		166		50	451
Crystal Lai	27 June 2005 (aged 19)				50	91
Jonathan Lai	16 September 1997 (aged 27)			123		91
Victor Lai	19 December 2004 (aged 20)	99		557		
Kevin Lee	10 November 1998 (aged 26)			58		103
Michelle Li	3 November 1991 (aged 33)		22			
Ty Alexander Lindeman	15 August 1997 (aged 27)			58		70
Josephine Wu	20 January 1995 (aged 30)				99	70
Nyl Yakura	14 February 1993 (aged 32)			49		
Brian Yang	25 November 2001 (aged 23)	34				
Eliana Zhang	14 December 2001 (aged 23)		383		151	103
Wen Yu Zhang	29 August 2002 (aged 22)		54		408	

=== Czech Republic ===
11 players will represent Czech Republic.

Name	Age	Ranking of event				
Name	Age	MS	WS	MD	WD	XD
Soňa Hořínková	30 April 2003 (aged 21)				114	182
Jan Janoštík	19 November 2003 (aged 21)	569		276		
Jiří Král	19 December 2000 (aged 24)	428		128		1050
Ondřej Král	15 April 1999 (aged 26)			74		353
Vít Kulíšek	13 June 2001 (aged 23)			144		809
Jan Louda	25 April 1999 (aged 26)	83				
Petra Maixnerová	30 April 2003 (aged 21)		124			
Adam Mendrek	14 November 1995 (aged 29)			74		
Tereza Švábíková	14 May 2000 (aged 24)		75		832	353
Tomáš Švejda	14 March 2002 (aged 23)			144		182
Kateřina Zuzáková	14 May 2000 (aged 24)				114	809

=== South Korea ===
15 players will represent South Korea.

Name	Age	Ranking of event				
Name	Age	MS	WS	MD	WD	XD
An Se-young	5 February 2002 (aged 23)		1			
Baek Ha-na	22 September 2000 (aged 24)				2	
Chae Yoo-jung	9 May 1995 (aged 29)					38; 120
Cho Geon-yeop	1 April 1996 (aged 29)	144				
Jeon Hyeok-jin	13 June 1995 (aged 29)	40				
Jeong Na-eun	11 December 1996 (aged 28)				25; 141	17; 145
Kang Min-hyuk	17 February 1999 (aged 26)			9; 125		
Ki Dong-ju	12 April 2001 (aged 24)			125		145
Kim Hye-jeong	3 January 1998 (aged 27)				10; 25	
Kim Won-ho	2 June 1999 (aged 25)			20		17
Kong Hee-yong	11 December 1996 (aged 28)				10	
Lee Jong-min	27 August 2006 (aged 18)					120
Lee So-hee	14 June 1994 (aged 30)				2	
Seo Seung-jae	4 September 1997 (aged 27)			9; 20		38
Sim Yu-jin	13 May 1999 (aged 25)		16			

== Group C ==
=== Australia ===
9 players will represent Australia.

Name	Age	Ranking of event				
Name	Age	MS	WS	MD	WD	XD
Shrey Dhand	7 December 2007 (aged 17)	300				
Kaitlin Ea	25 June 2003 (aged 21)		1275		172	219
Tiffany Ho	6 January 1998 (aged 27)		104		375	
Gronya Somerville	10 May 1995 (aged 29)				54	
Ricky Tang	6 April 2004 (aged 21)	183		440		386
Bernice Teoh	4 October 2003 (aged 21)	124			152	134
Angela Yu	8 March 2003 (aged 22)				54	
Jack Yu	13 September 2004 (aged 20)	116		99		
Frederick Zhao	27 August 2005 (aged 19)			292		214

=== France ===
10 players will represent France.

Name	Age	Ranking of event				
Name	Age	MS	WS	MD	WD	XD
Maël Cattoen	9 February 2004 (aged 21)			68		
Grégoire Deschamp	1 April 2003 (aged 22)					123
Léonice Huet	21 May 2000 (aged 24)		75			
Elsa Jacob	7 September 2006 (aged 18)				185	118
Margot Lambert	15 March 1999 (aged 26)				84	123
Arnaud Merklé	25 April 2000 (aged 25)	56				
Camille Pognante	5 October 2006 (aged 18)				84	
Lucas Renoir	7 March 2004 (aged 21)			68		
Enogat Roy	29 January 2003 (aged 22)	83				
Anna Tatranova	12 October 2003 (aged 21)		84			

=== Japan ===
18 players will represent Japan.

Name	Age	Ranking of event				
Name	Age	MS	WS	MD	WD	XD
~~Yuki Fukushima~~	6 May 1993 (aged 31)				28	
Sayaka Hobara	30 July 1998 (aged 26)					46
Takuro Hoki	14 August 1995 (aged 29)			12		
Arisa Igarashi	1 August 1996 (aged 28)				56	20
Rin Iwanaga	21 May 1995 (aged 29)				4	
Yugo Kobayashi	10 July 1995 (aged 29)			12		
~~Mayu Matsumoto~~	7 August 1995 (aged 29)				28	
Nami Matsuyama	28 June 1998 (aged 26)				3	
Hiroki Midorikawa	17 May 2000 (aged 24)			91		12
Tomoka Miyazaki	17 August 2006 (aged 18)		7			
Kie Nakanishi	24 December 1995 (aged 29)				4	
Kodai Naraoka	30 June 2001 (aged 23)	8				
Natsu Saito	9 June 2000 (aged 24)					12
Chiharu Shida	29 April 1997 (aged 27)				3	
Yuichi Shimogami	5 March 1998 (aged 27)			54		46
Koki Watanabe	29 January 1999 (aged 26)	11				
Akane Yamaguchi	6 June 1997 (aged 27)		3			
Kyohei Yamashita	12 October 1998 (aged 26)			91		170

=== Malaysia ===
20 players will represent Malaysia.

Name	Age	Ranking of event				
Name	Age	MS	WS	MD	WD	XD
Chen Tang Jie	5 January 1998 (aged 27)					4
Cheng Su Yin	16 June 2003 (aged 21)					14
Aaron Chia	24 February 1997 (aged 28)			6		
Go Pei Kee	18 April 2002 (aged 23)				26	103
Goh Jin Wei	30 January 2000 (aged 25)		48			
Goh Soon Huat	27 June 1990 (aged 34)					3
Goh Sze Fei	18 August 1997 (aged 27)			2		
Justin Hoh	1 April 2004 (aged 21)	48				
Hoo Pang Ron	29 March 1998 (aged 27)					14
Nur Izzuddin	19 November 1997 (aged 27)			2		
Shevon Jemie Lai	8 August 1993 (aged 31)					3
Leong Jun Hao	13 July 1999 (aged 25)	26				
Letshanaa Karupathevan	19 August 2003 (aged 21)		56			
Man Wei Chong	5 September 1999 (aged 25)			7		
Soh Wooi Yik	17 February 1998 (aged 27)			6		
Pearly Tan	14 March 2000 (aged 25)				5	
Tee Kai Wun	17 April 2000 (aged 25)			7		
Thinaah Muralitharan	3 January 1998 (aged 27)				5	
Carmen Ting	8 June 2006 (aged 18)				67	260
Toh Ee Wei	18 September 2000 (aged 24)					4

== Group D ==
=== Denmark ===
19 players will represent Denmark.

Name	Age	Ranking of event				
Name	Age	MS	WS	MD	WD	XD
Natasja Anthonisen	14 July 2001 (aged 23)				78	
Anders Antonsen	27 April 1997 (aged 28)	2				
Kim Astrup	6 March 1992 (aged 33)			1		
Mia Blichfeldt	19 August 1997 (aged 27)		23			
Christine Busch	15 March 2001 (aged 24)					25
Alexandra Bøje	6 December 1999 (aged 25)				462	27
Line Christophersen	14 January 2000 (aged 25)		36			
Rasmus Gemke	11 January 1997 (aged 28)	29				
Magnus Johannesen	2 February 2002 (aged 23)	54				
Rasmus Kjær	4 October 1998 (aged 26)			14		
Line Kjærsfeldt	20 April 1994 (aged 31)		24			
Amalie Cecilie Kudsk	27 September 2001 (aged 23)				45	42
Daniel Lundgaard	2 July 2000 (aged 24)			29		
Amalie Magelund	13 May 2000 (aged 24)				531	13
Anders Skaarup Rasmussen	15 February 1989 (aged 36)			1		
Frederik Søgaard	25 July 1997 (aged 27)			14		
Andreas Søndergaard	3 May 1998 (aged 26)			24		
Jesper Toft	7 February 1999 (aged 26)			24		
Mads Vestergaard	11 March 2002 (aged 23)			29		25

=== England ===
12 players will represent England.

Name	Age	Ranking of event				
Name	Age	MS	WS	MD	WD	XD
Nadeem Dalvi	1 September 2004 (aged 20)	184				
Rory Easton	16 January 2001 (aged 24)			65		57
Alex Green	29 July 2003 (aged 21)			65		
Abbygael Harris	18 May 2001 (aged 23)				106	171
Callum Hemming	27 June 1999 (aged 25)			53		37
Harry Huang	25 August 2001 (aged 23)	103				
Annie Lado	23 February 2002 (aged 23)				96	144
Kirby Ngan	27 March 1998 (aged 27)		967			
Freya Redfearn	12 November 2000 (aged 24)		154			
Lizzie Tolman	12 June 1999 (aged 25)				106	57
Estelle van Leeuwen	1 November 2004 (aged 20)				40	37
Ethan van Leeuwen	8 April 2001 (aged 24)			53		68

=== India ===
14 players will represent India. The women's doubles pair Gayatri Gopichand and Treesa Jolly as well as the men's doubles pair Chirag Shetty and Satwiksairaj Rankireddy withdrew from the squad due to injuries.

Name	Age	Ranking of event				
Name	Age	MS	WS	MD	WD	XD
Hariharan Amsakarunan	18 May 2003 (aged 21)			42		
Tanisha Crasto	5 May 2003 (aged 21)					17
~~Gayatri Gopichand~~	4 March 2003 (aged 22)				9	
~~Treesa Jolly~~	27 May 2003 (aged 21)				9	
Dhruv Kapila	1 February 2000 (aged 25)					17
Sathish Karunakaran	30 June 2001 (aged 23)					33
Priya Konjengbam	17 March 2001 (aged 24)				39	
Ruban Kumar	8 July 2003 (aged 21)			42		
Shruti Mishra	13 August 2002 (aged 22)				39	
Prannoy H. S.	17 July 1992 (aged 32)	30				
~~Satwiksairaj Rankireddy~~	13 August 2000 (aged 24)			7		
Lakshya Sen	16 August 2001 (aged 23)	10				
~~Chirag Shetty~~	4 July 1997 (aged 27)			7		
P. V. Sindhu	5 July 1995 (aged 29)		15			
Anupama Upadhyaya	12 February 2005 (aged 20)		44			
Aadya Variyath	2 December 2001 (aged 23)					33

=== Indonesia ===
19 players will represent Indonesia.

Name	Age	Ranking of event				
Name	Age	MS	WS	MD	WD	XD
Fajar Alfian	7 March 1995 (aged 30)			4		
Muhammad Rian Ardianto	13 February 1996 (aged 29)			4		
Jonatan Christie	15 September 1997 (aged 27)	4				
Alwi Farhan	12 May 2005 (aged 19)	37				
Dejan Ferdinansyah	21 January 2000 (aged 25)					10
Muhammad Shohibul Fikri	16 November 1999 (aged 25)			15		
Rehan Naufal Kusharjanto	28 February 2000 (aged 25)					23
Febriana Dwipuji Kusuma	20 February 2001 (aged 24)				8	
Daniel Marthin	31 July 2001 (aged 23)			15		
Bagas Maulana	20 July 1998 (aged 26)			13		
Lanny Tria Mayasari	8 May 2002 (aged 22)				32	
Pitha Haningtyas Mentari	1 July 1999 (aged 25)					16
Amalia Cahaya Pratiwi	14 October 2001 (aged 23)				8	
Siti Fadia Silva Ramadhanti	16 November 2000 (aged 24)				27	90
Rinov Rivaldy	12 November 1999 (aged 25)					16
Ester Nurumi Tri Wardoyo	26 August 2004 (aged 20)		34			
Zaki Ubaidillah	26 June 2007 (aged 17)	74				
Putri Kusuma Wardani	20 July 2002 (aged 22)		11			
Gloria Emanuelle Widjaja	28 December 1993 (aged 31)					10
