= 2026 Thomas & Uber Cup squads =

Badminton tournament squads

This article details the confirmed squads for the 2026 Thomas & Uber Cup participating teams. The rankings used to decide the order of play are based on the BWF World Ranking per 7 April 2026.

== Thomas Cup ==
=== Group A ===
==== China ====
Ten players represented China in the 2026 Thomas Cup.

Name	DoB/Age	Ranking of event	
Name	DoB/Age	MS	MD
Chen Boyang	6 May 2000 (aged 25)		10
He Jiting	19 February 1998 (aged 28)		173
Li Shifeng	9 January 2000 (aged 26)	7	
Liang Weikeng	30 November 2000 (aged 25)		3
Liu Yi	7 July 2003 (aged 22)		10
Lu Guangzu	19 October 1996 (aged 29)	18	
Ren Xiangyu	23 October 1998 (aged 27)		142
Shi Yuqi	28 February 1996 (aged 30)	2	
Wang Chang	7 May 2001 (aged 24)		3
Weng Hongyang	18 June 1999 (aged 26)	17	

==== India ====
Ten players represented India in the 2026 Thomas Cup.

Name	DoB/Age	Ranking of event	
Name	DoB/Age	MS	MD
Hariharan Amsakarunan	18 May 2003 (aged 22)		34
Kiran George	11 February 2000 (aged 26)	45	
Dhruv Kapila	1 February 2000 (aged 26)		
Srikanth Kidambi	7 February 1993 (aged 33)	30	
Prannoy H. S.	17 July 1992 (aged 33)	35	
Arjun M. R.	11 May 1997 (aged 28)		34
Satwiksairaj Rankireddy	13 August 2000 (aged 25)		4
Lakshya Sen	16 August 2001 (aged 24)	12	
Ayush Shetty	3 May 2005 (aged 20)	25	
Chirag Shetty	4 July 1997 (aged 28)		4

==== Canada ====
Ten players represented Canada in the 2026 Thomas Cup.

Name	DoB/Age	Ranking of event	
Name	DoB/Age	MS	MD
Kiren Milan DeRaj	19 October 2002 (aged 23)	606	145
Jonathan Lai	16 September 1997 (aged 28)		78
Victor Lai	19 December 2004 (aged 21)	13	1,619
Kevin Lee	10 November 1998 (aged 27)		50
Daniel Leung	14 December 2005 (aged 20)		299
Ty Alexander Lindeman	15 August 1997 (aged 28)		50
Timothy Lock	4 November 2005 (aged 20)	154	299
Joshua Nguyen	9 September 2005 (aged 20)	72	
Nyl Yakura	14 February 1993 (aged 33)	1,092	78
Brian Yang	25 November 2001 (aged 24)	31	

==== Australia ====
Seven players represented Australia in the 2026 Thomas Cup.

Name	DoB/Age	Ranking of event	
Name	DoB/Age	MS	MD
Rishi Boopathy	30 December 2009 (aged 16)	622	504
Shrey Dhand	7 December 2007 (aged 18)	248	797
Rizky Hidayat	13 May 1994 (aged 31)		236
Andika Ramadiansyah	6 January 1998 (aged 28)		344
Ephraim Sam	4 July 2005 (aged 20)	168	293
Jack Yu	13 September 2004 (aged 21)	213	137
Frederick Zhao	27 August 2005 (aged 20)	2,092	231

=== Group B ===
==== Japan ====
Ten players represented Japan in the 2026 Thomas Cup. On April 10, the Badminton Association of Japan announced that Kenta Nishimoto was replaced by Yudai Okimoto, and on April 21, it was announced that Yugo Kobayashi was replaced by Hiroki Midorikawa.

Name	DoB/Age	Ranking of event	
Name	DoB/Age	MS	MD
Takuro Hoki	14 August 1995 (aged 30)		8
~~Yugo Kobayashi~~	10 July 1995 (aged 30)		8
Kakeru Kumagai	5 January 2002 (aged 24)		26
Kodai Naraoka	30 June 2001 (aged 24)	10	
Hiroki Nishi	21 March 2003 (aged 23)		26
~~Kenta Nishimoto~~	30 August 1994 (aged 31)	15	
Takumi Nomura	7 August 1997 (aged 28)		31
Yudai Okimoto	7 August 1997 (aged 28)	37	
Yuichi Shimogami	5 March 1998 (aged 28)		31
Yushi Tanaka	5 October 1999 (aged 26)	19	
Koki Watanabe	29 January 1999 (aged 27)	21	
Hiroki Midorikawa	17 May 2000 (aged 25)		20

==== Malaysia ====
Ten players represented Malaysia in the 2026 Thomas Cup.

Name	DoB/Age	Ranking of event	
Name	DoB/Age	MS	MD
Aidil Sholeh	9 January 2000 (aged 26)	52	
Aaron Chia	24 February 1997 (aged 29)		2
Goh Sze Fei	18 August 1997 (aged 28)		7
Justin Hoh	1 April 2004 (aged 22)	40	
Nur Izzuddin	11 November 1997 (aged 28)		7
Lee Zii Jia	29 March 1998 (aged 28)	83	
Leong Jun Hao	13 July 1999 (aged 26)	23	
Man Wei Chong	5 September 1999 (aged 26)		6
Soh Wooi Yik	17 February 1998 (aged 28)		2
Tee Kai Wun	17 April 2000 (aged 26)		6

==== England ====
Ten players represented England in the 2026 Thomas Cup.

Name	DoB/Age	Ranking of event	
Name	DoB/Age	MS	MD
Oliver Butler	4 March 2005 (aged 21)		70
Nadeem Dalvi	1 September 2004 (aged 21)	234	
Alex Green	29 July 2003 (aged 22)		83
Robin Harper	3 October 2005 (aged 20)		95
Harry Huang	25 August 2001 (aged 24)	60	
Samuel Jones	4 February 2004 (aged 22)		70
Cholan Kayan	6 March 2003 (aged 23)	148	
Kalyan Manoj	2 September 2009 (aged 16)	1,046	
Zach Russ	3 July 2000 (aged 25)		83
Harry Wakefield	14 June 2005 (aged 20)		95

==== Finland ====
Six players represented Finland in the 2026 Thomas Cup.

Name	DoB/Age	Ranking of event	
Name	DoB/Age	MS	MD
Ananda Galvani Daniswara	12 July 2004 (aged 21)	704	789
Kalle Koljonen	26 February 1994 (aged 32)	53	1,622
Alvar Melleri	14 April 2006 (aged 20)	738	494
Eliel Melleri	31 December 2003 (aged 22)	318	214
Niilo Nyqvist	10 January 2004 (aged 22)	1,016	214
Joakim Oldorff	14 December 2002 (aged 23)	50	1,532

=== Group C ===
==== Chinese Taipei ====
Ten players represented Chinese Taipei in the 2026 Thomas Cup.

Name	DoB/Age	Ranking of event	
Name	DoB/Age	MS	MD
Chi Yu-jen	25 June 1997 (aged 28)	20	
Chiu Hsiang-chieh	11 November 2002 (aged 23)		12
Chou Tien-chen	8 January 1990 (aged 36)	6	
Lee Chia-hao	4 June 1999 (aged 26)	33	
Lee Jhe-huei	20 March 1994 (aged 32)		14
Lin Chun-yi	2 October 1999 (aged 26)	8	
Liu Kuang-heng	15 August 2003 (aged 22)		23
Wang Chi-lin	18 January 1995 (aged 31)		12
Yang Po-han	13 March 1994 (aged 32)		23
Yang Po-hsuan	23 August 1996 (aged 29)		14

==== Denmark ====
Ten players represented Denmark in the 2026 Thomas Cup. Rasmus Gemke subsequently withdrew due to a foot injury, and was replaced by William Bøgebjerg.

Name	DoB/Age	Ranking of event	
Name	DoB/Age	MS	MD
Anders Antonsen	27 April 1997 (aged 28)	3	
Kim Astrup	6 March 1992 (aged 34)		11
William Bøgebjerg	29 June 2006 (aged 19)	106	
Mathias Christiansen	20 February 1994 (aged 32)		
~~Rasmus Gemke~~	11 January 1997 (aged 29)	24	
Ditlev Jæger Holm	30 June 1997 (aged 28)	61	
Magnus Johannesen	2 February 2002 (aged 24)	39	
Rasmus Kjær	4 October 1998 (aged 27)		44
Daniel Lundgaard	2 July 2000 (aged 25)		18
Anders Skaarup Rasmussen	15 February 1989 (aged 37)		11
Mads Vestergaard	11 March 2002 (aged 24)		18

==== South Korea ====
Ten players represented South Korea in the 2026 Thomas Cup.

Name	DoB/Age	Ranking of event	
Name	DoB/Age	MS	MD
Cho Hyeon-woo	29 August 2006 (aged 19)	173	
Cho Song-hyun	21 July 2004 (aged 21)		105
Choi Ji-hoon	21 February 2001 (aged 25)	87	
Jin Yong	8 April 2003 (aged 23)		41
Ki Dong-ju	12 April 2001 (aged 25)		22
Kim Won-ho	2 June 1999 (aged 26)		1
Lee Jong-min	27 August 2006 (aged 19)		106
Park Sang-yong	30 September 2001 (aged 24)	91	
Seo Seung-jae	4 September 1997 (aged 28)		1
Yoo Tae-bin	15 December 2003 (aged 22)	66	

==== Sweden ====
Ten players represented Sweden in the 2026 Thomas Cup.

Name	DoB/Age	Ranking of event	
Name	DoB/Age	MS	MD
Ludwig Axelsson	3 August 2003 (aged 22)		421
Gustav Björkler	29 March 2002 (aged 24)	108	974
Jesper Borgstedt	7 May 2001 (aged 24)		188
Joel Hansson	25 September 2001 (aged 24)		188
Filip Karlborg	16 February 2002 (aged 24)		324
Kim Linell	12 August 2004 (aged 21)	376	
Romeo Makboul	18 April 2006 (aged 20)	925	
Mio Molin	30 March 2005 (aged 21)		130
Tim Mörk	3 July 2003 (aged 22)	386	
Max Svensson	8 February 2002 (aged 24)		130

=== Group D ===
==== Indonesia ====
Ten players represented Indonesia in the 2026 Thomas Cup.

Name	DoB/Age	Ranking of event	
Name	DoB/Age	MS	MD
Fajar Alfian	7 March 1995 (aged 31)		5
Jonatan Christie	15 September 1997 (aged 28)	4	
Alwi Farhan	12 May 2005 (aged 20)	14	
Muhammad Shohibul Fikri	16 November 1999 (aged 26)		5
Anthony Sinisuka Ginting	20 October 1996 (aged 29)	47	
Sabar Karyaman Gutama	8 January 1996 (aged 30)		9
Raymond Indra	24 April 2004 (aged 22)		13
Muhammad Reza Pahlevi Isfahani	6 August 1998 (aged 27)		9
Nikolaus Joaquin	14 September 2005 (aged 20)		13
Zaki Ubaidillah	26 June 2007 (aged 18)	41	

==== France ====
Ten players represented France in the 2026 Thomas Cup.

Name	DoB/Age	Ranking of event	
Name	DoB/Age	MS	MD
Éloi Adam	16 March 1999 (aged 27)		38
Maël Cattoen	9 February 2004 (aged 22)		45
Alex Lanier	26 January 2005 (aged 21)	9	
Julien Maio	6 May 1994 (aged 31)		76
Christo Popov	8 March 2002 (aged 24)	5	21
Toma Junior Popov	29 September 1998 (aged 27)	16	21
Lucas Renoir	7 March 2004 (aged 22)		45
Léo Rossi	25 December 1999 (aged 26)		38
Enogat Roy	5 May 2003 (aged 22)	95	
William Villeger	22 October 2000 (aged 25)		76

==== Thailand ====
Ten players represented Thailand in the 2026 Thomas Cup.

Name	DoB/Age	Ranking of event	
Name	DoB/Age	MS	MD
Puritat Arree	28 January 2003 (aged 23)	218	
Chaloempon Charoenkitamorn	15 April 1997 (aged 29)		55
Ruttanapak Oupthong	12 April 2000 (aged 26)		
Dechapol Puavaranukroh	20 May 1997 (aged 28)		24
Peeratchai Sukphun	31 August 2004 (aged 21)		72
Pakkapon Teeraratsakul	11 November 2004 (aged 21)		72
Panitchaphon Teeraratsakul	11 November 2004 (aged 21)	27	
Worrapol Thongsa-nga	29 October 1995 (aged 30)		55
Kunlavut Vitidsarn	11 May 2001 (aged 24)	1	
Tanawat Yimjit	7 December 2004 (aged 21)	327	

==== Algeria ====
Five players represented Algeria in the 2026 Thomas Cup.

Name	DoB/Age	Ranking of event	
Name	DoB/Age	MS	MD
Mohamed Abderrahime Belarbi	8 August 1992 (aged 33)	429	196
Adel Hamek	25 October 1992 (aged 33)	279	196
Koceila Mammeri	23 February 1999 (aged 27)	2,092	126
Youcef Sabri Medel	5 July 1996 (aged 29)		126
Mohamed Abdelaziz Ouchefoun	9 September 2001 (aged 24)	462	500

== Uber Cup ==
=== Group A ===
==== China ====
Ten players represented China in the 2026 Uber Cup.

Name	DoB/Age	Ranking of event	
Name	DoB/Age	WS	WD
Chen Yufei	1 March 1998 (aged 28)	3	
Han Yue	18 January 1999 (aged 27)	5	
Jia Yifan	29 June 1997 (aged 28)		4
Li Yijing	12 January 2002 (aged 24)		9
Liu Shengshu	8 April 2004 (aged 22)		1
Luo Xumin	5 August 2002 (aged 23)		9
Tan Ning	3 April 2003 (aged 23)		1
Wang Zhiyi	29 April 2000 (aged 25)	2	
Xu Wenjing	11 July 2007 (aged 18)	97	
Zhang Shuxian	2 January 2000 (aged 26)		4

==== India ====
Ten players represented India in the 2026 Uber Cup. Gayatri Gopichand and Treesa Jolly were later announced as withdrawing from the tournament and were replaced by Priya Konjengbam and Shruti Mishra.

Name	DoB/Age	Ranking of event	
Name	DoB/Age	WS	WD
Isharani Baruah	4 January 2004 (aged 22)	39	
Tanisha Crasto	5 May 2003 (aged 22)		353
~~Gayatri Gopichand~~	4 March 2003 (aged 23)		
Unnati Hooda	20 September 2007 (aged 18)	27	
~~Treesa Jolly~~	27 May 2003 (aged 22)		
Priya Konjengbam	11 March 2001 (aged 25)		51
Shruti Mishra	13 August 2002 (aged 23)		51
Kavipriya Selvam	2 February 2003 (aged 23)	267	45
Tanvi Sharma	22 December 2008 (aged 17)	34	
Devika Sihag	18 April 2005 (aged 21)	43	1,052
P. V. Sindhu	5 July 1995 (aged 30)	13	
Simran Singhi	11 April 2002 (aged 24)		45

==== Denmark ====
Ten players represented Denmark in the 2026 Uber Cup.

Name	DoB/Age	Ranking of event	
Name	DoB/Age	WS	WD
Mia Blichfeldt	19 August 1997 (aged 28)	21	
Alexandra Bøje	6 December 1999 (aged 26)		740
Christine Busch	15 March 2001 (aged 25)		
Line Christophersen	14 January 2000 (aged 26)	20	655
Line Kjærsfeldt	20 April 1994 (aged 32)	22	
Anna Klausholm	19 June 2005 (aged 20)		91
Amalie Cecilie Kudsk	27 September 2001 (aged 24)		59
Simona Pilgaard	19 December 2003 (aged 22)		69
Amalie Schulz	26 June 2001 (aged 24)	52	722
Mette Werge	10 August 2003 (aged 22)		64

==== Ukraine ====
Eight players represented Ukraine in the 2026 Uber Cup.

Name	DoB/Age	Ranking of event	
Name	DoB/Age	WS	WD
Raiia Almalalha	3 May 2008 (aged 17)	420	132
Anastasiia Alymova	10 June 2007 (aged 18)	248	682
Polina Buhrova	30 January 2004 (aged 22)	45	30
Yevheniia Kantemyr	4 July 2005 (aged 20)	124	30
Maria Koriagina	9 August 2007 (aged 18)	528	219
Sofiia Lavrova	28 August 2005 (aged 20)	190	132
Mariia Stoliarenko	30 April 2004 (aged 21)	343	149
Yaroslava Vantsarovska	23 February 2007 (aged 19)	1,095	219

=== Group B ===
==== Japan ====
Ten players represented Japan in the 2026 Uber Cup. The Badminton Association of Japan announced that Manami Suizu was replaced by Hina Akechi.

Name	DoB/Age	Ranking of event	
Name	DoB/Age	WS	WD
Hina Akechi	14 March 2005 (aged 21)	29	
Yuki Fukushima	6 May 1993 (aged 32)		6
Riko Gunji	31 July 2002 (aged 23)	25	
Arisa Igarashi	1 August 1996 (aged 29)		15
Rin Iwanaga	21 May 1999 (aged 26)		7
Mayu Matsumoto	7 August 1995 (aged 30)		6
Tomoka Miyazaki	17 August 2006 (aged 19)	9	
Kie Nakanishi	24 December 1995 (aged 30)		7
Chiharu Shida	29 April 1997 (aged 28)		15
~~Manami Suizu~~	8 October 2003 (aged 22)	41	
Akane Yamaguchi	6 June 1997 (aged 28)	4	

==== Malaysia ====
Ten players represented Malaysia in the 2026 Uber Cup. Pearly Tan subsequently withdrew due to a back injury. She was replaced by Chong Jie Yu.

Name	DoB/Age	Ranking of event	
Name	DoB/Age	WS	WD
Chong Jie Yu	8 December 2005 (aged 20)		64
Goh Jin Wei	30 January 2000 (aged 26)	51	
Letshanaa Karupathevan	19 August 2003 (aged 22)	37	
Low Zi Yu	21 August 2010 (aged 15)	904	172
Noraqilah Maisarah	11 July 2007 (aged 18)		180
Ong Xin Yee	23 October 2006 (aged 19)		25
~~Pearly Tan~~	14 March 2000 (aged 26)		2
Thinaah Muralitharan	3 January 1998 (aged 28)		2
Carmen Ting	8 June 2006 (aged 19)		25
Wong Ling Ching	7 October 2003 (aged 22)	38	
Siti Zulaikha	26 July 2006 (aged 19)	90	

==== Turkey ====
Eight players represented Turkey in the 2026 Uber Cup.

Name	DoB/Age	Ranking of event	
Name	DoB/Age	WS	WD
Neslihan Arın	26 February 1994 (aged 32)	35	608
Özge Bayrak	14 February 1992 (aged 34)	73	
Yasemen Bektaş	12 August 2003 (aged 22)		119
Bengisu Erçetin	1 January 2001 (aged 25)		33
Zehra Erdem	23 June 2001 (aged 24)	212	
Nazlıcan İnci	6 March 2000 (aged 26)		33
İkra Elif Özyiğit	10 November 2006 (aged 19)		414
Sinem Yıldız	3 April 2006 (aged 20)		119

==== South Africa ====
Five players represented South Africa in the 2026 Uber Cup.

Name	DoB/Age	Ranking of event	
Name	DoB/Age	WS	WD
Amy Ackerman	15 May 1999 (aged 26)	1,327	96
Elme de Villiers	22 November 1997 (aged 28)	471	335
Chloe Lai	30 July 1991 (aged 34)	442	925
Johanita Scholtz	18 March 2003 (aged 23)	161	96
Anri Schoonees	24 October 2003 (aged 22)		335

=== Group C ===
==== Taiwan ====
Ten players represented Taiwan in the 2026 Uber Cup.

Name	DoB/Age	Ranking of event	
Name	DoB/Age	WS	WD
Chiu Pin-chian	15 May 1999 (aged 26)	14	
Hsieh Pei-shan	22 November 1997 (aged 28)		8
Hsu Ya-ching	30 July 1991 (aged 34)		13
Hsu Yin-hui	18 March 2003 (aged 23)		12
Huang Yu-hsun	24 October 2003 (aged 22)	30	
Hung En-tzu	6 July 2001 (aged 24)		8
Lin Hsiang-ti	20 November 1998 (aged 27)	18	
Lin Jhih-yun	13 September 1999 (aged 26)		12
Sung Shuo-yun	15 June 1997 (aged 28)	36	39
Sung Yu-hsuan	8 April 2003 (aged 23)		13

==== Indonesia ====
Ten players represented Indonesia in the 2026 Uber Cup.

Name	DoB/Age	Ranking of event	
Name	DoB/Age	WS	WD
Febriana Dwipuji Kusuma	20 February 2001 (aged 25)		16
Amallia Cahaya Pratiwi	14 October 2001 (aged 24)		19
Ni Kadek Dhinda Amartya Pratiwi	13 June 2006 (aged 19)	70	
Meilysa Trias Puspita Sari	11 May 2004 (aged 21)		16
Siti Fadia Silva Ramadhanti	16 November 2000 (aged 25)		41
Rachel Allessya Rose	30 June 2004 (aged 21)		22
Febi Setianingrum	29 February 2004 (aged 22)		22
Putri Kusuma Wardani	20 July 2002 (aged 23)	6	
Ester Nurumi Tri Wardoyo	26 August 2004 (aged 21)	198	
Thalita Ramadhani Wiryawan	21 September 2007 (aged 18)	65	

==== Canada ====
Nine players represented Canada in the 2026 Uber Cup.

Name	DoB/Age	Ranking of event	
Name	DoB/Age	WS	WD
Rachel Chan	15 November 2003 (aged 22)	77	
Catherine Choi	1 May 2001 (aged 24)	504	115
Jackie Dent	27 June 2005 (aged 20)	446	38
Chloe Hoang	23 November 2005 (aged 20)	98	575
Crystal Lai	25 September 2001 (aged 24)		38
Michelle Li	3 November 1991 (aged 34)	12	
Josephine Wu	20 January 1995 (aged 31)		168
Eliana Zhang	14 December 2001 (aged 24)	1,074	240
Wen Yu Zhang	29 August 2002 (aged 23)	47	240

==== Australia ====
Six players represented Australia in the 2026 Uber Cup.

Name	DoB/Age	Ranking of event	
Name	DoB/Age	WS	WD
Jesslyn Carrisia	22 February 2009 (aged 17)	405	370
Tiffany Ho	6 January 1998 (aged 28)	121	364
Faye Huo	28 September 2008 (aged 17)	181	364
Gronya Somerville	10 May 1995 (aged 30)	1,336	37
Victoria Tjonadi	11 June 2008 (aged 17)	307	268
Angela Yu	8 March 2003 (aged 23)		37

=== Group D ===
==== South Korea ====
Ten players represented South Korea in the 2026 Uber Cup.

Name	DoB/Age	Ranking of event	
Name	DoB/Age	WS	WD
An Se-young	5 February 2002 (aged 24)	1	
Baek Ha-na	22 September 2000 (aged 25)		3
Jeong Na-eun	27 June 2000 (aged 25)		11
Kim Ga-eun	7 February 1998 (aged 28)	16	
Kim Ga-ram	24 January 2002 (aged 24)	261	
Kim Hye-jeong	3 January 1998 (aged 28)		5
Lee Seo-jin	23 December 2004 (aged 21)		122
Lee So-hee	14 June 1994 (aged 31)		3
Lee Yeon-woo	13 January 2001 (aged 25)		11
Sim Yu-jin	13 May 1999 (aged 26)	19	

==== Thailand ====
Ten players represented Thailand in the 2026 Uber Cup.

Name	DoB/Age	Ranking of event	
Name	DoB/Age	WS	WD
Benyapa Aimsaard	29 August 2002 (aged 23)		87
Pornpawee Chochuwong	22 January 1998 (aged 28)	8	
Ratchanok Intanon	5 February 1995 (aged 31)	7	
Ornnicha Jongsathapornparn	15 July 1999 (aged 26)		46
Supanida Katethong	26 October 1997 (aged 28)	11	
Hathaithip Mijad	12 September 2007 (aged 18)		49
Busanan Ongbamrungphan	22 March 1996 (aged 30)	17	
Supissara Paewsampran	18 November 1999 (aged 26)		894
Jhenicha Sudjaipraparat	18 February 1999 (aged 27)		631
Napapakorn Tungkasatan	2 October 2008 (aged 17)		49

==== Bulgaria ====
Nine players represented Bulgaria in the 2026 Uber Cup.

Name	DoB/Age	Ranking of event	
Name	DoB/Age	WS	WD
Mihaela Chepisheva	27 November 2004 (aged 21)	518	155
Mariya Mitsova	21 November 1996 (aged 29)		450
Kaloyana Nalbantova	6 March 2006 (aged 20)	55	343
Gergana Pavlova	27 July 2003 (aged 22)	189	207
Elena Popivanova	1 June 2010 (aged 15)		1,103
Tsvetina Popivanova	1 July 2005 (aged 20)		155
Hristomira Popovska	5 September 2000 (aged 25)	167	229
Gabriela Stoeva	15 July 1994 (aged 31)		10
Stefani Stoeva	23 September 1995 (aged 30)	79	10

==== Spain ====
Nine players represented Spain in the 2026 Uber Cup.

Name	DoB/Age	Ranking of event	
Name	DoB/Age	WS	WD
Clara Azurmendi	4 May 1998 (aged 27)	74	331
Nikol Carulla	30 July 2005 (aged 20)		72
Inés Costero	16 March 2006 (aged 20)		
Carmen Maria Jiménez	4 February 2006 (aged 20)		72
Paula López	7 October 1999 (aged 26)		80
Lucía Rodríguez	8 March 2004 (aged 22)		80
Ania Setién	6 March 2003 (aged 23)	328	
Cristina Teruel	12 June 2005 (aged 20)	215	230
Amaia Torralba	18 June 2004 (aged 21)		422
