= 2024 Thomas & Uber Cup squads =

This article lists the confirmed squad list for the 2024 Thomas & Uber Cup participating teams. The rankings used to decide the order of play are based on the BWF World Ranking per 9 April 2024.

The age listed for each player is on 27 April 2024 which was the first day of the tournament. Only a maximum of ten players were allowed to compete in each squad.

== Thomas Cup ==
=== Group A ===
==== China ====
Ten players represented China in the 2024 Thomas Cup.

Name	DoB/Age	Ranking of event	
Name	DoB/Age	MS	MD
Lu Guangzu	19 October 1996 (aged 27)	19	
Li Shifeng	9 January 2000 (aged 24)	6	
Weng Hongyang	18 June 1999 (aged 24)	16	
He Jiting	19 February 1998 (aged 26)		11
Ou Xuanyi	23 January 1994 (aged 30)		8
Liu Yuchen	25 July 1995 (aged 28)		8
Ren Xiangyu	23 October 1998 (aged 25)		11
Liang Weikeng	30 November 2000 (aged 23)		1
Wang Chang	7 May 2001 (aged 22)		1
Shi Yuqi	28 February 1996 (aged 28)	2	

==== South Korea ====
Ten players represented South Korea in the 2024 Thomas Cup.

Name	DoB/Age	Ranking of event	
Name	DoB/Age	MS	MD
Jeon Hyeok-jin	13 June 1995 (aged 28)	49	
Lee Yun-gyu	1 November 1997 (aged 26)	123	
Seo Seung-jae	4 September 1997 (aged 26)		2
Kang Min-hyuk	17 February 1999 (aged 25)		2
Kim Won-ho	2 June 1999 (aged 24)		31
Jin Yong	8 April 2003 (aged 21)		38
Cho Geon-yeop	1 April 1996 (aged 28)	120	
Jeong Min-seon	4 June 1999 (aged 24)	265	
Ki Dong-ju	12 April 2001 (aged 23)		181
Woo Seung-hoon	3 February 1999 (aged 25)	1434	

==== Canada ====
Eight players represented Canada in the 2024 Thomas Cup.

Name	DoB/Age	Ranking of event	
Name	DoB/Age	MS	MD
Brian Yang	25 November 2001 (aged 22)	23	
Nyl Yakura	14 February 1993 (aged 31)		35
Victor Lai	19 December 2004 (aged 19)	104	
Kevin Lee	10 November 1998 (aged 25)		40
Adam Dong	14 February 1994 (aged 30)		35
Ty Alexander Lindeman	15 August 1997 (aged 26)		40
Josh Nguyen	9 September 2005 (aged 18)	347	
Imran Wadia	24 October 1996 (aged 27)	157	752

==== Australia ====
Seven players represented Australia in the 2024 Thomas Cup.

Name	DoB/Age	Ranking of event	
Name	DoB/Age	MS	MD
Kenneth Choo	1 April 1997 (aged 27)		331
Shrey Dhand	7 December 2007 (aged 16)	296	
Jacob Schueler	17 February 1998 (aged 26)	175	
Huaidong Tang	21 March 1998 (aged 26)		213
Ricky Tang	6 April 2004 (aged 20)	160	497
Rayne Wang	17 January 2003 (aged 21)		380
Jack Yu	9 September 2005 (aged 18)	208	168

=== Group B ===
==== Japan ====
Ten players represented Japan in the 2024 Thomas Cup.

Name	DoB/Age	Ranking of event	
Name	DoB/Age	MS	MD
Kento Momota	1 September 1994 (aged 29)	52	
Kenta Nishimoto	30 August 1994 (aged 29)	12	
Kodai Naraoka	30 June 2001 (aged 22)	6	
Takuro Hoki	14 August 1995 (aged 28)		6
Yugo Kobayashi	10 July 1995 (aged 28)		6
Koki Watanabe	13 June 1997 (aged 26)	21	
Akira Koga	8 March 1994 (aged 30)		16
Taichi Saito	21 April 1993 (aged 31)		16
Kenya Mitsuhashi	11 July 1997 (aged 26)		25
Hiroki Okamura	6 December 1998 (aged 25)		25

==== Chinese Taipei ====
Ten players represented Chinese Taipei in the 2024 Thomas Cup.

Name	DoB/Age	Ranking of event	
Name	DoB/Age	MS	MD
Chou Tien-chen	8 January 1990 (aged 34)	15	
Lee Chia-hao	4 June 1999 (aged 24)	34	1433
Lee Jhe-huei	20 March 1994 (aged 30)		14
Lee Yang	12 August 1995 (aged 28)		10
Lin Chun-yi	2 October 1999 (aged 24)	19	
Lu Ching-yao	7 June 1993 (aged 30)		22
Wang Chi-lin	18 January 1995 (aged 29)		10
Wang Tzu-wei	27 February 1995 (aged 29)	24	
Yang Po-hsuan	23 August 1996 (aged 27)		14
Ye Hong-wei	1 November 1999 (aged 24)		55

==== Germany ====
Ten players represented Germany in the 2024 Thomas Cup.

Name	DoB/Age	Ranking of event	
Name	DoB/Age	MS	MD
Bjarne Geiss	29 November 1997 (aged 26)		53
Daniel Hess	31 July 1998 (aged 25)		99
Samuel Hsiao	25 December 1998 (aged 25)	170	
Jones Ralfy Jansen	12 November 1992 (aged 31)		98
Matthias Kicklitz	5 April 2002 (aged 22)	115	208
Kenneth Neumann	17 September 2004 (aged 19)		98
Fabian Roth	29 November 1995 (aged 28)	86	
Kai Schäfer	13 June 1993 (aged 30)	81	
Marvin Seidel	9 November 1995 (aged 28)		27
Jan Colin Völker	26 February 1998 (aged 26)		53

==== Czech Republic ====
Six players represented Czech Republic in the 2024 Thomas Cup.

Name	DoB/Age	Ranking of event	
Name	DoB/Age	MS	MD
Dominik Kopřiva	23 September 2004 (aged 19)	422	
Jiří Král	19 December 2000 (aged 23)	269	716
Ondřej Král	15 April 1999 (aged 25)		46
Jan Louda	25 April 1999 (aged 25)	54	
Adam Mendrek	14 November 1995 (aged 28)	1915	46
Tomáš Švejda	14 March 2002 (aged 22)		152

=== Group C ===
==== Indonesia ====
Ten players represented Indonesia in the 2024 Thomas Cup.

Name	DoB/Age	Ranking of event	
Name	DoB/Age	MS	MD
Anthony Sinisuka Ginting	20 October 1996 (aged 27)	3	
Jonatan Christie	15 September 1997 (aged 26)	5	
Chico Aura Dwi Wardoyo	15 June 1998 (aged 25)	29	
Alwi Farhan	12 May 2005 (aged 18)	62	
Fajar Alfian	7 March 1995 (aged 29)		7
Muhammad Rian Ardianto	13 February 1996 (aged 28)		7
Bagas Maulana	20 July 1997 (aged 26)		8
Muhammad Shohibul Fikri	16 November 1999 (aged 24)		8
Leo Rolly Carnando	29 July 2001 (aged 22)		13
Daniel Marthin	31 July 2001 (aged 22)		13

==== India ====
Ten players represented India in the 2024 Thomas Cup.

Name	DoB/Age	Ranking of event	
Name	DoB/Age	MS	MD
Lakshya Sen	16 August 2001 (aged 22)	13	
Srikanth Kidambi	7 February 1993 (aged 31)	27	
Prannoy H. S.	17 July 1992 (aged 31)	9	
Priyanshu Rajawat	1 February 2002 (aged 22)	32	
Kiran George	11 February 2000 (aged 24)	36	
Satwiksairaj Rankireddy	13 August 2000 (aged 23)		1
Chirag Shetty	4 July 1997 (aged 26)		1
Arjun M. R.	11 May 1997 (aged 26)		42
Dhruv Kapila	1 February 2000 (aged 24)		42
Sai Pratheek K.	3 May 2000 (aged 23)		49

==== Thailand ====
Ten players represented Thailand in the 2024 Thomas Cup.

Name	DoB/Age	Ranking of event	
Name	DoB/Age	MS	MD
Saran Jamsri	20 January 2000 (aged 24)	161	
Tanadon Punpanich	1 October 2002 (aged 21)		82
Nachakorn Pusri	21 July 2005 (aged 18)	326	
Sirawit Sothon	19 January 2002 (aged 22)		85
Wachirawit Sothon	20 January 2000 (aged 24)		82
Peeratchai Sukphun	31 August 2004 (aged 19)		56
Panitchaphon Teeraratsakul	11 November 2004 (aged 19)	102	
Natthapat Trinkajee	12 June 2000 (aged 23)		85
Pakkapon Teeraratsakul	11 November 2004 (aged 19)		56
Kunlavut Vitidsarn	11 May 2001 (aged 22)	8	

==== England ====
Nine players represented England in the 2024 Thomas Cup.

Name	DoB/Age	Ranking of event	
Name	DoB/Age	MS	MD
Nadeem Dalvi	1 September 2004 (aged 19)	194	
Rory Easton	16 January 2001 (aged 23)		74
Alex Green	29 July 2003 (aged 20)		129
Callum Hemming	27 June 1999 (aged 24)		70
Harry Huang	25 August 2001 (aged 22)	103	
Cholan Kayan	6 March 2003 (aged 21)	211	
Ben Lane	13 July 1997 (aged 26)		20
Ethan van Leeuwen	8 April 2001 (aged 23)		70
Sean Vendy	18 May 1996 (aged 27)		20

=== Group D ===
==== Denmark ====
Ten players represented Denmark in the 2024 Thomas Cup.

Name	DoB/Age	Ranking of event	
Name	DoB/Age	MS	MD
Anders Antonsen	27 April 1997 (aged 27)	4	
Kim Astrup	6 March 1992 (aged 32)		4
Viktor Axelsen	4 January 1994 (aged 30)	1	
Mathias Christiansen	20 February 1994 (aged 30)		-
Rasmus Gemke	11 January 1997 (aged 27)	28	
Magnus Johannesen	2 February 2002 (aged 22)	35	
Rasmus Kjær	4 October 1998 (aged 25)		17
Anders Skaarup Rasmussen	15 February 1989 (aged 35)		4
Frederik Søgaard	25 July 1997 (aged 26)		17
Jesper Toft	7 February 1999 (aged 25)		44

==== Malaysia ====
Ten players represented Malaysia in the 2024 Thomas Cup.

Name	DoB/Age	Ranking of event	
Name	DoB/Age	MS	MD
Cheam June Wei	23 January 1997 (aged 27)	61	
Aaron Chia	24 February 1997 (aged 27)		5
Choong Hon Jian	2 July 2000 (aged 23)		28
Goh Sze Fei	18 August 1997 (aged 26)		19
Muhammad Haikal	26 December 2002 (aged 21)		28
Justin Hoh	1 April 2004 (aged 20)	234	
Nur Izzuddin	11 November 1997 (aged 26)		19
Lee Zii Jia	29 March 1998 (aged 26)	11	
Leong Jun Hao	13 July 1999 (aged 24)	37	
Soh Wooi Yik	17 February 1998 (aged 26)		5

==== Hong Kong ====
Ten players represented Hong Kong in the 2024 Thomas Cup.

Name	DoB/Age	Ranking of event	
Name	DoB/Age	MS	MD
Chan Yin Chak	7 January 1999 (aged 25)	90	
Jason Gunawan	18 June 2004 (aged 19)	92	
Hung Kuei Chun	15 September 2003 (aged 20)		401
Law Cheuk Him	26 February 1994 (aged 30)		144
Lee Cheuk Yiu	28 August 1996 (aged 27)	14	
Lee Chun Hei	25 January 1994 (aged 30)		-
Lui Chun Wai	10 January 2001 (aged 23)		231
Ng Ka Long	24 June 1994 (aged 29)	26	
Tang Chun Man	20 March 1995 (aged 29)		-
Yeung Shing Choi	21 March 1996 (aged 28)		144

==== Algeria ====
Six players represented Algeria in the 2024 Thomas Cup.

Name	DoB/Age	Ranking of event	
Name	DoB/Age	MS	MD
Mohamed Abderrahime Belarbi	8 August 1992 (aged 31)	358	185
Adel Hamek	25 October 1992 (aged 31)	224	185
Sifeddine Larbaoui	30 June 2002 (aged 21)	412	257
Koceila Mammeri	23 February 1999 (aged 25)		62
Youcef Sabri Medel	5 July 1996 (aged 27)	268	62
Mohamed Abdelaziz Ouchefoun	9 September 2001 (aged 22)	345	257

== Uber Cup ==
=== Group A ===
==== China ====
Ten players represented China in the 2024 Uber Cup.

Name	DoB/Age	Ranking of event	
Name	DoB/Age	WS	WD
Chen Qingchen	23 June 1997 (aged 26)		1
Chen Yufei	1 March 1998 (aged 26)	2	
Han Yue	18 November 1999 (aged 24)	7	
He Bingjiao	21 March 1997 (aged 27)	6	
Jia Yifan	29 June 1997 (aged 26)		1
Liu Shengshu	8 April 2004 (aged 20)		3
Tan Ning	3 April 2003 (aged 21)		3
Wang Zhiyi	29 April 2000 (aged 23)	9	
Zhang Shuxian	2 January 2000 (aged 24)		7
Zheng Yu	7 January 1996 (aged 28)		7

==== India ====
Eight players represented India in the 2024 Uber Cup.

Name	DoB/Age	Ranking of event	
Name	DoB/Age	WS	WD
Ashmita Chaliha	18 October 1999 (aged 24)	53	
Isharani Baruah	1 January 2004 (aged 20)	81	
Anmol Kharb	20 January 2007 (aged 17)	255	
Tanvi Sharma	22 December 2008 (aged 15)	589	203
Priya Konjengbam	17 March 2001 (aged 23)		65
Simran Singhi	11 April 2002 (aged 22)		66
Ritika Thaker	17 January 2001 (aged 23)		66
Shruti Mishra	13 August 2002 (aged 21)		65

==== Canada ====
Ten players represented Canada in the 2024 Uber Cup.

Name	DoB/Age	Ranking of event	
Name	DoB/Age	WS	WD
Rachel Chan	15 November 2003 (aged 20)	63	
Catherine Choi	1 May 2001 (aged 22)		29
Jeslyn Chow	30 July 2003 (aged 20)	302	74
Jackie Dent	27 June 2005 (aged 18)	237	88
Crystal Lai	25 September 2001 (aged 22)		88
Michelle Li	3 November 1991 (aged 32)	24	546
Talia Ng	6 November 2001 (aged 22)	82	104
Josephine Wu	20 January 1995 (aged 29)		29
Eliana Zhang	14 December 2001 (aged 22)	85	74
Wen Yu Zhang	29 August 2002 (aged 21)	50	104

==== Singapore ====
Nine players represented Singapore in the 2024 Uber Cup.

Name	DoB/Age	Ranking of event	
Name	DoB/Age	WS	WD
Heng Xiao En	9 June 2006 (aged 17)		567
Jaslyn Hooi	5 October 2000 (aged 23)	131	
Insyirah Khan	12 September 2001 (aged 22)	153	
Jin Yujia	6 February 1997 (aged 27)		44
Elsa Lai	24 February 2005 (aged 19)		775
Megan Lee	27 May 2005 (aged 18)	207	
Lim Su Qi	9 March 2002 (aged 22)		521
Yeo Jia Min	1 February 1999 (aged 25)	19	
Michelle Zan	31 January 2007 (aged 17)		972

=== Group B ===
==== Thailand ====
Nine players represented Thailand in the 2024 Uber Cup.

Name	DoB/Age	Ranking of event	
Name	DoB/Age	WS	WD
Nuntakarn Aimsaard	23 May 1999 (aged 24)		15
Pornpawee Chochuwong	22 January 1998 (aged 26)	18	
Ratchanok Intanon	5 February 1995 (aged 29)	11	
Laksika Kanlaha	17 December 1997 (aged 26)		36
Supanida Katethong	26 October 1997 (aged 26)	16	
Jongkolphan Kititharakul	1 March 1993 (aged 31)		10
Phataimas Muenwong	5 July 1995 (aged 28)		36
Busanan Ongbamrungphan	22 March 1996 (aged 28)	20	
Rawinda Prajongjai	29 June 1993 (aged 30)		10

==== Chinese Taipei ====
Ten players represented Chinese Taipei in the 2024 Uber Cup.

Name	DoB/Age	Ranking of event	
Name	DoB/Age	WS	WD
Chang Ching-hui	17 May 1996 (aged 27)		37
Hsu Wen-chi	28 September 1997 (aged 26)	27	1014
Hsu Ya-ching	30 July 1991 (aged 32)		24
Hu Ling-fang	6 April 1998 (aged 26)		60
Lin Wan-ching	1 November 1995 (aged 28)		24
Pai Yu-po	18 April 1991 (aged 33)	32	
Sung Shuo-yun	15 June 1997 (aged 26)	29	48
Tai Tzu-ying	20 June 1994 (aged 29)	3	
Teng Chun-hsun	27 September 2000 (aged 23)		25
Yang Ching-tun	17 November 1995 (aged 28)		37

==== Malaysia ====
Ten players represented Malaysia in the 2024 Uber Cup.

Name	DoB/Age	Ranking of event	
Name	DoB/Age	WS	WD
Chan Wen Tse	27 June 2005 (aged 18)		266
Go Pei Kee	18 April 2002 (aged 22)		80
Goh Jin Wei	30 January 2000 (aged 24)	33	
Ho Lo Ee	13 January 2003 (aged 21)		107
Letshanaa Karupathevan	19 August 2003 (aged 20)	66	
Siti Nurshuhaini	1 September 2004 (aged 19)	260	
Tan Zhing Yi	1 August 2003 (aged 20)		222
Teoh Mei Xing	6 March 1997 (aged 27)		57
Wong Ling Ching	7 October 2003 (aged 20)	77	
Siti Zulaikha	26 July 2006 (aged 17)	263	

==== Australia ====
Seven players represented Australia in the 2024 Uber Cup.

Name	DoB/Age	Ranking of event	
Name	DoB/Age	WS	WD
Kaitlyn Ea	25 June 2003 (aged 20)		56
Tiffany Ho	6 January 1998 (aged 26)	92	141
Setyana Mapasa	15 August 1995 (aged 28)		31
Gronya Somerville	10 May 1995 (aged 28)		56
Sydney Tjonadi	27 September 2006 (aged 17)	211	181
Isabella Yan	29 May 2007 (aged 16)	284	475
Angela Yu	8 March 2003 (aged 21)		31

=== Group C ===
==== Japan ====
Nine players represented Japan in the 2024 Uber Cup.

Name	DoB/Age	Ranking of event	
Name	DoB/Age	WS	WD
Nami Matsuyama	28 June 1998 (aged 25)		4
Rena Miyaura	25 July 1995 (aged 28)		11
Tomoka Miyazaki	17 August 2006 (aged 17)	25	
Wakana Nagahara	9 January 1996 (aged 28)		8
Aya Ohori	2 October 1996 (aged 27)	13	
Nozomi Okuhara	13 March 1995 (aged 29)	17	
Ayako Sakuramoto	19 August 1995 (aged 28)		11
Chiharu Shida	29 April 1997 (aged 26)		4
Akane Yamaguchi	6 June 1997 (aged 26)	4	

==== Indonesia ====
Ten players represented Indonesia in the 2024 Uber Cup.

Name	DoB/Age	Ranking of event	
Name	DoB/Age	WS	WD
Gregoria Mariska Tunjung	11 August 1999 (aged 24)	8	
Ester Nurumi Tri Wardoyo	26 August 2004 (aged 19)	35	
Komang Ayu Cahya Dewi	21 October 2002 (aged 21)	42	
Ruzana	22 January 2005 (aged 19)	107	
Apriyani Rahayu	29 April 1998 (aged 25)		9
Siti Fadia Silva Ramadhanti	16 November 2000 (aged 23)		9
Lanny Tria Mayasari	8 May 2002 (aged 21)		27
Ribka Sugiarto	22 January 2000 (aged 24)		27
Meilysa Trias Puspita Sari	11 May 2004 (aged 19)		32
Rachel Allessya Rose	30 June 2004 (aged 19)		32

==== Hong Kong ====
Ten players represented Hong Kong in the 2024 Uber Cup.

Name	DoB/Age	Ranking of event	
Name	DoB/Age	WS	WD
Fan Ka Yan	27 January 1997 (aged 27)		114
Liang Ka Wing	19 June 2005 (aged 18)	358	
Lo Sin Yan	25 February 2003 (aged 21)	56	
Lui Lok Lok	22 September 2002 (aged 21)		43
Saloni Samirbhai Mehta	27 August 2002 (aged 21)	184	
Ng Wing Yung	17 May 1995 (aged 28)		43
Yau Mau Ying	24 October 1999 (aged 24)	1270	114
Yeung Nga Ting	13 October 1998 (aged 25)		18
Yeung Pui Lam	26 October 2001 (aged 22)		18
Yeung Sum Yee	18 August 1999 (aged 24)	143	

==== Uganda ====
Four players represented Uganda in the 2024 Uber Cup.

Name	DoB/Age	Ranking of event	
Name	DoB/Age	WS	WD
Husina Kobugabe	21 March 2001 (aged 23)	129	67
Gladys Mbabazi	1 May 1996 (aged 27)	161	67
Fadilah Mohamed Rafi	6 April 2005 (aged 19)	109	84
Tracy Naluwooza	6 September 2006 (aged 17)	199	84

=== Group D ===
==== South Korea ====
Nine players represented South Korea in the 2024 Uber Cup.

Name	DoB/Age	Ranking of event	
Name	DoB/Age	WS	WD
An Se-young	5 February 2002 (aged 22)	1	
Baek Ha-na	22 September 2000 (aged 23)		2
Jeong Na-eun	27 June 2000 (aged 23)		12
Kim Ga-ram	24 January 2002 (aged 22)	72	
Kim Hye-jeong	3 January 1998 (aged 26)		12
Kim Min-sun	2 January 2006 (aged 18)	-	-
Kong Hee-yong	11 December 1996 (aged 27)		5
Lee So-hee	14 June 1994 (aged 29)		2
Sim Yu-jin	13 May 1999 (aged 24)	38	

==== Denmark ====
Nine players represented Denmark in the 2024 Uber Cup.

Name	DoB/Age	Ranking of event	
Name	DoB/Age	WS	WD
Christine Busch	15 March 2001 (aged 23)		308
Alexandra Bøje	6 December 1999 (aged 24)		992
Line Christophersen	14 January 2000 (aged 24)	30	
Maiken Fruergaard	11 May 1995 (aged 28)		23
Julie Dawall Jakobsen	25 March 1998 (aged 26)	44	
Line Kjærsfeldt	20 April 1994 (aged 30)	23	
Amalie Magelund	13 May 2000 (aged 23)		770
Sara Thygesen	20 January 1991 (aged 33)		23
Amalie Schulz	26 June 2001 (aged 22)	88	365

==== United States ====
Ten players represented United States in the 2024 Uber Cup.

Name	DoB/Age	Ranking of event	
Name	DoB/Age	WS	WD
Chloe Ho	7 April 2006 (aged 18)	-	-
Ella Lin	17 November 2006 (aged 18)	641	
Katelin Ngo	20 September 2002 (aged 21)	425	603
Esther Shi	7 November 2001 (aged 22)	209	
Joline Siu	29 May 2005 (aged 18)	856	340
Alice Wang	8 October 2007 (aged 16)	-	-
Annie Xu	22 October 1999 (aged 24)		33
Kerry Xu	22 October 1999 (aged 24)		33
Veronica Yang	23 June 2006 (aged 17)	1050	
Beiwen Zhang	12 July 1990 (aged 33)	10	

==== Mexico ====
Four players represented Mexico in the 2024 Uber Cup.

Name	DoB/Age	Ranking of event	
Name	DoB/Age	WS	WD
Haramara Gaitán	7 August 1996 (aged 27)	99	54
Vanessa García	26 May 2004 (aged 19)	93	
Fatima Rio	29 January 2001 (aged 23)	526	
Sabrina Solís	30 August 1996 (aged 27)	100	54
