= 2020 Thomas & Uber Cup squads =

Badminton championship in Denmark

This article lists the confirmed squads for the 2020 Thomas & Uber Cup. The rankings used to decide the order of play are based on the BWF World Ranking per 21 September 2021. The age listed for each player is on 9 October 2021, the first day of the tournament.

== Thomas Cup ==
=== Group A ===
==== Indonesia ====
Name	DoB/Age	Ranking of event	
Name	DoB/Age	MS	MD
Mohammad Ahsan	7 September 1987 (aged 34)		2
Fajar Alfian	7 March 1995 (aged 26)		7
Muhammad Rian Ardianto	13 February 1996 (aged 25)		7
Leo Rolly Carnando	29 July 2001 (aged 20)		38
Jonatan Christie	15 September 1997 (aged 24)	7	
Marcus Fernaldi Gideon	9 March 1991 (aged 30)		1
Anthony Sinisuka Ginting	20 October 1996 (aged 24)	5	
Daniel Marthin	31 July 2001 (aged 20)		38
Shesar Hiren Rhustavito	3 March 1994 (aged 27)	19	
Hendra Setiawan	25 August 1984 (aged 37)		2
Kevin Sanjaya Sukamuljo	2 August 1995 (aged 26)		1
Chico Aura Dwi Wardoyo	15 June 1998 (aged 23)	64	

==== Chinese Taipei ====
Name	DoB/Age	Ranking of event	
Name	DoB/Age	MS	MD
Chi Yu-jen	25 June 1997 (aged 24)	167	
Chou Tien-chen	8 January 1990 (aged 31)	4	
Lee Jhe-huei	20 March 1994 (aged 27)		30
Lee Yang	12 August 1995 (aged 26)		3
Liao Jhuo-fu	26 July 2002 (aged 19)	–	–
Lu Ching-yao	7 June 1993 (aged 28)		23
Wang Chi-lin	18 January 1995 (aged 26)		3
Wang Tzu-wei	27 February 1995 (aged 26)	11	
Yang Po-han	13 March 1994 (aged 27)		23
Yang Po-hsuan	23 August 1996 (aged 25)		30

==== Algeria ====
Name	DoB/Age	Ranking of event	
Name	DoB/Age	MS	MD
Mohamed Abderrahime Belarbi	8 August 1992 (aged 29)	252	139
Adel Hamek	25 October 1992 (aged 28)	292	139
Koceila Mammeri	23 February 1999 (aged 22)	242	63
Youcef Sabri Medel	5 July 1996 (aged 25)	183	63

==== Thailand ====
Name	DoB/Age	Ranking of event	
Name	DoB/Age	MS	MD
Suppanyu Avihingsanon	24 October 1989 (aged 31)	54	
Chaloempon Charoenkitamorn	15 April 1997 (aged 24)		414
Supak Jomkoh	4 September 1996 (aged 25)		153
Kittinupong Kedren	19 July 1996 (aged 25)		153
Adulrach Namkul	2 November 1997 (aged 23)	150	
Dechapol Puavaranukroh	20 May 1997 (aged 24)		–
Natthapat Trinkajee	12 June 2000 (aged 21)		804
Varot Uraiwong	9 May 2002 (aged 19)	753	
Tanupat Viriyangkura	10 March 1996 (aged 25)		54
Kunlavut Vitidsarn	11 May 2001 (aged 20)	25	
Kantaphon Wangcharoen	18 September 1998 (aged 23)	18	
Nanthakarn Yordphaisong	23 September 1993 (aged 28)		414

=== Group B ===
==== Denmark ====
Name	DoB/Age	Ranking of event	
Name	DoB/Age	MS	MD
Anders Antonsen	27 April 1997 (aged 24)	3	
Kim Astrup	6 March 1992 (aged 29)		11
Viktor Axelsen	4 January 1994 (aged 27)	2	
Jeppe Bay	4 March 1997 (aged 24)		66
Mathias Christiansen	20 February 1994 (aged 27)		70
Rasmus Gemke	11 January 1997 (aged 24)	12	
Mads Pieler Kolding	27 January 1988 (aged 33)		166
Lasse Mølhede	25 October 1993 (aged 27)		66
Anders Skaarup Rasmussen	15 February 1989 (aged 32)		11
Frederik Søgaard	25 July 1997 (aged 24)		166
Victor Svendsen	2 August 1995 (aged 26)	62	
Hans-Kristian Vittinghus	16 January 1986 (aged 35)	20	

==== South Korea ====
Name	DoB/Age	Ranking of event	
Name	DoB/Age	MS	MD
Cho Geon-yeop	1 April 1996 (aged 25)	–	
Choi Sol-gyu	5 August 1995 (aged 26)		9
Heo Kwang-hee	11 August 1995 (aged 26)	34	
Jeon Hyeok-jin	13 June 1995 (aged 26)	–	
Jin Yong	8 April 2003 (aged 18)	–	
Kang Min-hyuk	17 February 1999 (aged 22)		147
Kim Dong-hun	15 September 1993 (aged 28)	116	661
Kim Won-ho	2 June 1999 (aged 22)		147
Na Sung-seung	28 August 1999 (aged 22)		51
Seo Seung-jae	4 September 1997 (aged 24)		9

==== France ====
Name	DoB/Age	Ranking of event	
Name	DoB/Age	MS	MD
Fabien Delrue	22 June 2000 (aged 21)		84
Thom Gicquel	12 January 1999 (aged 22)		83
Alex Lanier	26 January 2005 (aged 16)	193	
Arnaud Merklé	24 April 2000 (aged 21)	93	
Christo Popov	8 March 2002 (aged 19)	71	38
Toma Junior Popov	29 September 1998 (aged 23)	33	38
Thomas Rouxel	26 May 1991 (aged 30)	41	
William Villeger	22 October 2000 (aged 20)		84

==== Germany ====
Name	DoB/Age	Ranking of event	
Name	DoB/Age	MS	MD
Daniel Hess	31 July 1998 (aged 23)		661
Jones Ralfy Jansen	12 November 1992 (aged 28)		33
Matthias Kicklitz	5 April 2002 (aged 19)	580	
Mark Lamsfuß	19 April 1994 (aged 27)		17
Johannes Pistorius	16 June 1995 (aged 26)		804
Fabian Roth	29 November 1995 (aged 25)	383	
Kai Schäfer	13 June 1993 (aged 28)	76	
Marvin Seidel	9 November 1995 (aged 25)		17
Jan Colin Völker	26 February 1998 (aged 23)		661
Max Weißkirchen	18 October 1996 (aged 24)	59	

=== Group C ===
==== China ====
Name	DoB/Age	Ranking of event	
Name	DoB/Age	MS	MD
Di Zijian	27 February 2001 (aged 20)		39
Gu Junfeng	22 October 1999 (aged 21)	511	
He Jiting	19 February 1998 (aged 23)		20
Li Shifeng	9 January 2000 (aged 21)	65	
Liu Cheng	4 January 1992 (aged 29)		21
Lu Guangzu	19 October 1996 (aged 24)	27	
Shi Yuqi	28 February 1996 (aged 25)	10	
Tan Qiang	16 September 1998 (aged 23)		20
Wang Chang	7 May 2001 (aged 20)		39
Wang Yilyu	8 November 1994 (aged 26)		–
Weng Hongyang	18 June 1999 (aged 22)	147	
Zhou Haodong	20 February 1998 (aged 23)		–

==== India ====
Name	DoB/Age	Ranking of event	
Name	DoB/Age	MS	MD
M.R. Arjun	11 May 1997 (aged 24)		47
Krishna Prasad Garaga	15 March 2000 (aged 21)		186
Kiran George	11 February 2000 (aged 21)	101	
Dhruv Kapila	1 February 2000 (aged 21)		47
Srikanth Kidambi	7 February 1993 (aged 28)	14	
B. Sai Praneeth	10 August 1992 (aged 29)	15	
Satwiksairaj Rankireddy	13 August 2000 (aged 21)		10
Chirag Shetty	4 July 1997 (aged 24)		10
Vishnu Vardhan	11 February 2001 (aged 20)		186
Sameer Verma	22 October 1994 (aged 26)	28	

==== Netherlands ====
Name	DoB/Age	Ranking of event	
Name	DoB/Age	MS	MD
Andy Buijk	25 February 2002 (aged 19)	2020	269
Mark Caljouw	25 January 1995 (aged 26)	23	
Gijs Duijs	28 September 2000 (aged 21)		233
Ruben Jille	11 July 1996 (aged 25)		56
Joran Kweekel	16 May 1998 (aged 23)	85	
Robin Mesman	7 April 2002 (aged 19)	1149	1548
Ties van der Lecq	10 March 2000 (aged 21)		56
Brian Wassink	3 January 2001 (aged 20)		269

==== Tahiti ====
Name	DoB/Age	Ranking of event	
Name	DoB/Age	MS	MD
Louis Beaubois	10 April 2002 (aged 19)	1489	773
Léo Cucuel	3 June 1987 (aged 34)	–	1622
Glen Lefoll	28 December 1991 (aged 29)	–	–
Elias Maublanc	9 May 2007 (aged 14)	–	–
Rémi Rossi	23 December 1995 (aged 25)	–	–
Heiva Yvonet	6 June 2004 (aged 17)	–	–

=== Group D ===
==== Japan ====
Name	DoB/Age	Ranking of event	
Name	DoB/Age	MS	MD
Takuro Hoki	14 August 1995 (aged 26)		16
Yuki Kaneko	22 July 1994 (aged 27)		30
Yugo Kobayashi	10 July 1995 (aged 26)		16
Akira Koga	8 August 1994 (aged 27)		27
Kento Momota	1 September 1994 (aged 27)	1	
Kodai Naraoka	30 June 2001 (aged 20)	53	
Kenta Nishimoto	30 August 1994 (aged 27)	16	
Taichi Saito	21 April 1993 (aged 28)		27
Kanta Tsuneyama	21 June 1996 (aged 25)	13	
Koki Watanabe	29 January 1999 (aged 22)	42	
Yuta Watanabe	13 June 1997 (aged 24)		5

==== Malaysia ====
Name	DoB/Age	Ranking of event	
Name	DoB/Age	MS	MD
Cheam June Wei	23 January 1997 (aged 24)	70	
Aaron Chia	24 February 1997 (aged 24)		8
Goh Sze Fei	18 August 1997 (aged 24)		27
Lee Zii Jia	29 March 1998 (aged 23)	8	
Leong Jun Hao	13 July 1999 (aged 22)	121	
Low Hang Yee	22 February 1997 (aged 24)		74
Man Wei Chong	5 September 1999 (aged 22)		171
Ng Tze Yong	16 May 2000 (aged 21)	91	
Aidil Sholeh	9 January 2000 (aged 21)	122	
Soh Wooi Yik	17 February 1998 (aged 23)		8
Nur Izzuddin	11 November 1997 (aged 23)		27
Tee Kai Wun	17 April 2000 (aged 21)		171

==== Canada ====
Name	DoB/Age	Ranking of event	
Name	DoB/Age	MS	MD
Phillipe Charron	2 October 1989 (aged 32)		1629
Jason Ho-shue	29 August 1998 (aged 23)	46	31
B. R. Sankeerth	22 December 1997 (aged 23)	81	372
Maxime Tétreault	17 March 1990 (aged 31)		1629
Nyl Yakura	14 February 1993 (aged 28)		31
Brian Yang	25 November 2001 (aged 19)	43	

== Uber Cup ==
=== Group A ===
==== Japan ====
Name	DoB/Age	Ranking of event	
Name	DoB/Age	WS	WD
Yuki Fukushima	6 May 1993 (aged 28)		1
Arisa Higashino	1 August 1996 (aged 25)		–
Mayu Matsumoto	7 August 1995 (aged 26)		3
Misaki Matsutomo	8 February 1992 (aged 29)		–
Nami Matsuyama	28 June 1998 (aged 23)		9
Aya Ohori	2 October 1996 (aged 25)	20	
Nozomi Okuhara	13 March 1995 (aged 26)	3	
Chiharu Shida	29 April 1997 (aged 24)		9
Asuka Takahashi	13 November 1999 (aged 21)	97	
Sayaka Takahashi	29 July 1992 (aged 29)	15	
Akane Yamaguchi	6 June 1997 (aged 24)	5	

==== Indonesia ====
Name	DoB/Age	Ranking of event	
Name	DoB/Age	WS	WD
Nandini Putri Arumni	22 February 2001 (aged 20)	559	
Febby Valencia Dwijayanti Gani	11 February 2000 (aged 21)		132
Nita Violina Marwah	25 March 2001 (aged 20)		52
Jesita Putri Miantoro	1 May 2002 (aged 19)	–	–
Greysia Polii	11 August 1987 (aged 34)		6
Apriyani Rahayu	29 April 1998 (aged 23)		6
Siti Fadia Silva Ramadhanti	16 November 2000 (aged 20)		34
Ribka Sugiarto	22 January 2000 (aged 21)		34
Putri Syaikah	1 September 2001 (aged 20)		52
Gregoria Mariska Tunjung	11 August 1999 (aged 22)	21	
Putri Kusuma Wardani	20 July 2002 (aged 19)	126	
Ester Nurumi Tri Wardoyo	26 August 2004 (aged 17)	–	

==== Germany ====
Name	DoB/Age	Ranking of event	
Name	DoB/Age	WS	WD
Annabella Jäger	16 July 1998 (aged 23)		300
Stine Küspert	24 July 1999 (aged 22)		217
Yvonne Li	30 May 1998 (aged 23)	24	
Isabel Lohau	17 March 1992 (aged 29)		30
Leona Michalski	14 June 2002 (aged 19)	635	300
Emma Moszczyński	7 June 2001 (aged 20)		217
Thuc Phuong Nguyen	23 March 2003 (aged 18)	309	
Antonia Schaller	24 January 2004 (aged 17)	674	
Ann-Kathrin Spöri	23 April 2001 (aged 20)	180	1054
Franziska Volkmann	4 April 1994 (aged 27)		131

==== France ====
Name	DoB/Age	Ranking of event	
Name	DoB/Age	WS	WD
Marie Batomene	10 March 1995 (aged 26)	60	
Delphine Delrue	6 November 1998 (aged 22)		36
Yaëlle Hoyaux	1 February 1998 (aged 23)	76	338
Léonice Huet	21 May 2000 (aged 21)	75	
Margot Lambert	15 March 1999 (aged 22)		357
Léa Palermo	7 July 1993 (aged 28)		36
Qi Xuefei	28 February 1992 (aged 29)	41	
Anna Tatranova	12 October 2003 (aged 17)	329	351
Anne Tran	27 April 1996 (aged 25)		357

=== Group B ===
==== Thailand ====
Name	DoB/Age	Ranking of event	
Name	DoB/Age	WS	WD
Benyapa Aimsaard	29 August 2002 (aged 19)	70	64
Nuntakarn Aimsaard	23 May 1999 (aged 22)	195	64
Phittayaporn Chaiwan	21 February 2001 (aged 20)	31	366
Pornpawee Chochuwong	22 January 1998 (aged 23)	10	
Ratchanok Intanon	5 February 1995 (aged 26)	6	
Supanida Katethong	26 October 1997 (aged 23)	33	
Jongkolphan Kititharakul	1 March 1993 (aged 28)		8
Busanan Ongbamrungphan	22 March 1996 (aged 25)	13	
Supissara Paewsampran	18 November 1999 (aged 21)		179
Rawinda Prajongjai	29 June 1993 (aged 28)		8
Puttita Supajirakul	29 March 1996 (aged 25)		22
Sapsiree Taerattanachai	18 April 1992 (aged 29)		22

==== India ====
Name	DoB/Age	Ranking of event	
Name	DoB/Age	WS	WD
Malvika Bansod	15 September 2001 (aged 20)	118	
Aditi Bhatt	16 January 2003 (aged 18)	–	–
Tanisha Crasto	5 May 2003 (aged 18)		–
Gayathri Gopichand	4 March 2003 (aged 18)	217	
Treesa Jolly	27 May 2003 (aged 18)	550	174
Tasnim Mir	13 May 2005 (aged 16)	–	–
Saina Nehwal	17 March 1990 (aged 31)	19	
Rutaparna Panda	7 May 1999 (aged 22)		61
Ashwini Ponnappa	18 September 1989 (aged 32)		28
N. Sikki Reddy	18 August 1993 (aged 28)		28

==== Spain ====
Name	DoB/Age	Ranking of event	
Name	DoB/Age	WS	WD
Clara Azurmendi	4 May 1998 (aged 23)	58	119
Beatriz Corrales	3 December 1992 (aged 28)	71	119
Nerea Ivorra	8 November 1997 (aged 23)	191	131
Claudia Leal	21 January 2000 (aged 21)	828	131
Paula López	7 October 1999 (aged 22)		212
Lucía Rodríguez	8 March 2004 (aged 17)	293	181
Ania Setién	6 March 2003 (aged 18)	295	181
Lorena Uslé	16 February 1994 (aged 27)		212

==== Scotland ====
Name	DoB/Age	Ranking of event	
Name	DoB/Age	WS	WD
Rachel Andrew	19 January 2001 (aged 20)		483
Kirsty Gilmour	21 September 1993 (aged 28)	26	
Julie MacPherson	17 November 1997 (aged 23)	1342	49
Lauren Middleton	23 July 2000 (aged 21)	520	375
Eleanor O'Donnell	1 September 1998 (aged 23)		138
Rachel Sugden	13 November 2001 (aged 19)	248	375
Ciara Torrance	1 September 1999 (aged 22)		49

=== Group C ===
==== South Korea ====
Name	DoB/Age	Ranking of event	
Name	DoB/Age	WS	WD
An Se-young	5 February 2002 (aged 19)	8	
Chae Yoo-jung	9 May 1995 (aged 26)		–
Jeon Ju-i	4 March 1995 (aged 26)	146	
Kim Ga-eun	7 February 1998 (aged 23)	17	
Kim So-yeong	9 July 1992 (aged 29)		5
Kong Hee-yong	11 December 1996 (aged 24)		5
Lee So-hee	14 June 1994 (aged 27)		4
Shin Seung-chan	6 December 1994 (aged 26)		4
Sim Yu-jin	13 May 1999 (aged 22)	55	

==== Chinese Taipei ====
Name	DoB/Age	Ranking of event	
Name	DoB/Age	WS	WD
Chang Ching-hui	17 May 1996 (aged 25)		41
Hsu Ya-ching	30 July 1991 (aged 30)		29
Hu Ling-fang	4 June 1998 (aged 23)		29
Hung Yi-ting	4 May 1997 (aged 24)	142	518
Lee Chih-chen	3 January 1998 (aged 23)		42
Pai Yu-po	18 April 1991 (aged 30)	43	
Yu Chien-hui	8 May 1995 (aged 26)	659	171

==== Tahiti ====
Name	DoB/Age	Ranking of event	
Name	DoB/Age	WS	WD
Heirautea Curet	11 March 2005 (aged 16)	–	–
Maeva Gaillard	4 April 2007 (aged 14)	1007	702
Jenica Lesourd	28 April 2006 (aged 15)	–	–
Mélissa Mi You	25 December 2003 (aged 17)	1007	702
Chloé Segrestan	22 February 2002 (aged 19)	–	–

==== Egypt ====
Name	DoB/Age	Ranking of event	
Name	DoB/Age	WS	WD
Jana Ashraf	26 November 2000 (aged 20)	226	183
Rahma Mohamed Saad Eladawy	8 January 1998 (aged 23)	425	206
Doha Hany	10 September 1997 (aged 24)	112	37
Hadia Hosny	30 July 1988 (aged 33)	87	37
Nour Ahmed Youssri	17 July 2003 (aged 18)	207	183
Hana Tarek	4 May 1998 (aged 23)	361	206

=== Group D ===
==== China ====
Name	DoB/Age	Ranking of event	
Name	DoB/Age	WS	WD
Chen Qingchen	23 June 1997 (aged 24)		2
Chen Yufei	1 March 1998 (aged 23)	2	
Han Qianxi	29 January 2002 (aged 19)	–	
Han Yue	18 November 1999 (aged 21)	27	
He Bingjiao	21 March 1997 (aged 24)	9	
Huang Dongping	20 January 1995 (aged 26)		–
Jia Yifan	29 June 1997 (aged 24)		2
Li Wenmei	2 November 1999 (aged 21)		15
Liu Xuanxuan	18 June 2000 (aged 21)		21
Wang Zhiyi	29 April 2000 (aged 21)	18	
Xia Yuting	29 May 2000 (aged 21)		21
Zheng Yu	7 January 1996 (aged 25)		15

==== Denmark ====
Name	DoB/Age	Ranking of event	
Name	DoB/Age	WS	WD
Mia Blichfeldt	19 August 1997 (aged 24)	12	
Alexandra Bøje	6 December 1999 (aged 21)		31
Line Christophersen	14 January 2000 (aged 21)	23	
Maiken Fruergaard	11 May 1995 (aged 26)		16
Julie Dawall Jakobsen	25 March 1998 (aged 23)	39	
Line Kjærsfeldt	20 April 1994 (aged 27)	35	
Amalie Magelund	13 May 2000 (aged 21)		25
Mette Poulsen	14 June 1993 (aged 28)		326
Freja Ravn	17 February 2000 (aged 21)		25
Amalie Schulz	26 June 2001 (aged 20)	134	47
Sara Thygesen	20 January 1991 (aged 30)		16

==== Malaysia ====
Name	DoB/Age	Ranking of event	
Name	DoB/Age	WS	WD
Eoon Qi Xuan	2 November 2000 (aged 20)	123	
Go Pei Kee	18 April 2002 (aged 19)		–
Letshanaa Karupathevan	19 August 2003 (aged 18)	778	
Lee Meng Yean	30 March 1994 (aged 27)		11
Thinaah Muralitharan	3 January 1998 (aged 23)		19
Siti Nurshuhaini	1 September 2004 (aged 17)	461	
Kisona Selvaduray	1 October 1998 (aged 23)	53	
Pearly Tan	14 March 2000 (aged 21)		19
Teoh Mei Xing	6 March 1997 (aged 24)		68
Yap Ling	1 April 2000 (aged 21)		68

==== Canada ====
Name	DoB/Age	Ranking of event	
Name	DoB/Age	WS	WD
Rachel Chan	15 November 2003 (aged 17)	185	
Catherine Choi	1 May 2001 (aged 20)	239	51
Rachel Honderich	21 April 1996 (aged 25)	246	20
Crystal Lai	25 September 2001 (aged 20)		655
Michelle Li	3 November 1991 (aged 29)	11	
Talia Ng	6 November 2001 (aged 19)	183	655
Kristen Tsai	11 July 1995 (aged 26)		20
Wen Yu Zhang	29 August 2002 (aged 19)	269	1129
