= Waikato International =

International sporting competition

The Waikato International is an open international badminton tournament in New Zealand. This tournament is held in Waikato. This tournament is classified as BWF International Series tournament since Badminton World Federation (BWF) introduced in 1998, but it was downgraded to Future Series in 2015. Then, the event was promoted to a higher level of BWF International Series since 2017. Another tournament with higher level and prize money named New Zealand Open.

== Previous results ==
Year	Men's singles	Women's singles	Men's doubles	Women's doubles	Mixed doubles
1998	(New Zealand) Nick Hall	(New Zealand) Li Feng	(Australia) David Bamford (Australia) Peter Blackburn	(New Zealand) Tammy Jenkins (New Zealand) Rhona Robertson	(Australia) Peter Blackburn (Australia) Rhonda Cator
1999	(New Zealand) Geoffrey Bellingham	(New Zealand) Rebecca Gordon	(Australia) David Bamford (Australia) Peter Blackburn	(Australia) Rhonda Cator (Australia) Amanda Hardy	(Australia) Peter Blackburn (Australia) Rhonda Cator
2003	(Indonesia) Agus Hariyanto	(Japan) Kanako Yonekura	(Indonesia) Hendri Kurniawan Saputra (Indonesia) Denny Setiawan	(Japan) Seiko Yamada (Japan) Shizuka Yamamoto	(New Zealand) Daniel Shirley (New Zealand) Sara Runesten-Petersen
2005	(New Zealand) John Moody	(New Zealand) Rachel Hindley	(New Zealand) Geoffrey Bellingham (New Zealand) Craig Cooper	(New Zealand) Rebecca Bellingham (New Zealand) Rachel Hindley	(New Zealand) Daniel Shirley (New Zealand) Sara Runesten-Petersen
2006	(New Zealand) John Moody	(Japan) Kaori Imabeppu	(Australia) Glenn Warfe (Australia) Ross Smith	(Japan) Ikue Tatani (Japan) Aya Wakisaka	(New Zealand) Craig Cooper (New Zealand) Renee Flavell
2007	(Singapore) Ashton Chen Yong Zhao	(Singapore) Fu Mingtian	(Indonesia) Wifqi Windarto (Indonesia) Afiat Yuris Wirawan	(Singapore) Yao Lei (Singapore) Liu Fan Frances	(Thailand) Chayut Triyachart (Indonesia) Shinta Mulia Sari
2008	(India) Ajay Jayaram	(Japan) Ayaka Takahashi	(Japan) Rei Sato (Japan) Naomasa Senkyo	(Japan) Ayaka Takahashi (Japan) Koharu Yonemoto	(New Zealand) Henry Tam (New Zealand) Donna Haliday
2015 FS	(South Africa) Jacob Maliekal	(Australia) Joy Lai	(Australia) Matthew Chau (Australia) Sawan Serasinghe	(Indonesia) Setyana Mapasa (Australia) Gronya Somerville	(Australia) Sawan Serasinghe (Indonesia) Setyana Mapasa
2016 FS	(Vietnam) Nguyễn Tiến Minh	(Vietnam) Vũ Thị Trang	(Chinese Taipei) Liu Wei-chen (Chinese Taipei) Yang Po-han	(Australia) Tiffany Ho (Australia) Jennifer Tam	(New Zealand) Kevin Dennerly-Minturn (New Zealand) Susannah Leydon-Davis
2017 IS	(Netherlands) Erik Meijs	(Canada) Brittney Tam	(Chinese Taipei) Su Li-wei (Chinese Taipei) Ye Hong-wei	(Chinese Taipei) Li Zi-qing (Chinese Taipei) Teng Chun-hsun	(Indonesia) Riky Widianto (Indonesia) Richi Puspita Dili
2019 IS	(Vietnam) Nguyễn Tiến Minh	(China) Wang Siqi	(China) Xuheng Zhuanyi (China) Zhang Binrong	(China) Hou Fangfang (China) Li Jiajia	(Japan) Hiroki Midorikawa (Japan) Natsu Saito
2020 IS	Cancelled (Note: This tournament, originally to be played from 26 to 29 March, was later cancelled due to COVID-19 pandemic in New Zealand)				

== Performances by nation ==
	Nation	MS	WS	MD	WD	XD	Total
1	New Zealand	4	3	1	2	5	15
2	Australia	0	1	4	3	3	11
3	Japan	0	3	1	3	1	8
4	Singapore	1	1	1	1	1	5
5	China	0	1	1	1	0	3
5	Chinese Taipei	0	0	2	1	0	3
5	Vietnam	2	1	0	0	0	3
8	Indonesia	0	0	1	0	1	2
9	Canada	0	1	0	0	0	1
9	India	1	0	0	0	0	1
9	Hong Kong	1	0	0	0	0	1
9	Netherlands	1	0	0	0	0	1
9	South Africa	1	0	0	0	0	1
Total		11	11	11	11	11	55

== See also ==
- New Zealand Open
- Auckland International
- North Harbour International
