= North Harbour International =

The North Harbour International (also known as North Shore City International) is an open international badminton tournament in New Zealand. This was the first international tournament hosted on the North Shore of Auckland. This tournament organized by Badminton North Harbour with sanctioned by Badminton Oceania and Badminton World Federation.

== Previous results ==
Year	Men's singles	Women's singles	Men's doubles	Women's doubles	Mixed doubles	Ref
2001	(Australia) Nathan Malpass	(New Zealand) Rhona Robertson	(Australia) Ashley Brehaut (Australia) Stuart Brehaut	(New Zealand) Rhona Robertson (New Zealand) Sara Runesten-Petersen	(New Zealand) Nick Hall (New Zealand) Sara Runesten-Petersen	
2002	(New Zealand) Nick Hall	(Australia) Lenny Permana	(New Zealand) John Gordon (New Zealand) Daniel Shirley	(New Zealand) Nicole Gordon (New Zealand) Sara Runesten-Petersen	(New Zealand) Daniel Shirley (New Zealand) Sara Runesten-Petersen	
2003– 2004	Not held					
2005	(New Zealand) Geoff Bellingham	(New Zealand) Rebecca Bellingham	(New Zealand) Geoff Bellingham (New Zealand) Craig Cooper	(New Zealand) Nicole Gordon (New Zealand) Sara Runesten-Petersen	(New Zealand) Daniel Shirley (New Zealand) Sara Runesten-Petersen	
2006	(New Zealand) John Moody	(Australia) Huang Chia-chi	(New Zealand) Daniel Shirley (New Zealand) Craig Cooper	(New Zealand) Rachel Hindley (New Zealand) Kimberly Windsor	(Philippines) Kennevic Asuncion (Philippines) Kennie Asuncion	
2007	(France) Erwin Kehlhoffner	(Ukraine) Larisa Griga	(New Zealand) John Moody (New Zealand) Alan Chan	(Republic of Ireland) Chloe Magee (Republic of Ireland) Bing Huang	(Spain) Carlos Longo (Spain) Laura Molina	
2008	(New Zealand) John Moody	(Japan) Sayaka Sato	(Japan) Rei Sato (Japan) Naomasa Senkyo	(Japan) Ayaka Takahashi (Japan) Koharu Yonemoto	(New Zealand) Henry Tam (New Zealand) Donna Haliday	
2009– 2017	Not held					
2018	(New Zealand) Oscar Guo	(Indonesia) Jesica Muljati	(New Zealand) Kevin Dennerly-Minturn (New Zealand) Oliver Leydon-Davis	(Australia) Leanne Choo (Australia) Renuga Veeran	(New Zealand) Sally Fu (New Zealand) Susannah Leydon-Davis	
2019	(Vietnam) Nguyễn Tiến Minh	(China) Qiu Ziying	(China) Xuheng Zhuanyi (China) Zhang Binrong	(China) Pan Hanxiao (China) Yang Jiayi	(China) Zhang Hanyu (China) Pan Hanxiao	
2020	Cancelled (Note: This tournament, originally to be played from 19 to 22 March, was later cancelled due to the COVID-19 pandemic in New Zealand.)					
2021	Not held					
2022	(Japan) Yushi Tanaka	(Japan) Shiori Saito	(Chinese Taipei) Chang Ko-chi (Chinese Taipei) Po Li-wei	(Chinese Taipei) Sung Shuo-yun (Chinese Taipei) Yu Chien-hui	(Chinese Taipei) Chang Ko-chi (Chinese Taipei) Lee Chih-chen	
2023	Cancelled					
2024	(Australia) Karono	(Chinese Taipei) Tsai Hsin-pei	(Japan) Hiroki Midorikawa (Japan) Kyohei Yamashita	(Chinese Taipei) Lee Chih-chen (Chinese Taipei) Lin Yen-yu	(Chinese Taipei) Chen Cheng-kuan (Chinese Taipei) Lee Chih-chen	
2025	(Chinese Taipei) Wang Po-wei	(Chinese Taipei) Tung Ciou-tong	(Chinese Taipei) Su Ching-heng (Chinese Taipei) Wu Guan-xun	(Chinese Taipei) Chen Su-yu (Chinese Taipei) Hsieh Yi-en	(Chinese Taipei) Lin Yu-chieh (Chinese Taipei) Lee Chih-chen	
2026	(Japan) Rei Miyashita	(Chinese Taipei) Tung Ciou-tong	(Chinese Taipei) Chiu Shao-hua (Chinese Taipei) Lin Bing-wei	(Chinese Taipei) Hsieh Mi-yen (Chinese Taipei) Yu Chien-hui	(Australia) Andika Ramadiansyah (Australia) Nozomi Shimizu	

== Performances by nation ==
As of the 2026 edition

Rank	Nation	MS	WS	MD	WD	XD	Total
1	New Zealand*	5	2	5	4	5	21
2	Chinese Taipei	1	3	3	4	3	14
3	Australia	2	2	1	1	1	7
3	Japan	2	2	2	1	0	7
5	China	0	1	1	1	1	4
6	France	1	0	0	0	0	1
6	Indonesia	0	1	0	0	0	1
6	Ireland	0	0	0	1	0	1
6	Philippines	0	0	0	0	1	1
6	Spain	0	0	0	0	1	1
6	Ukraine	0	1	0	0	0	1
6	Vietnam	1	0	0	0	0	1
Total		12	12	12	12	12	60

* Host nation

== See also ==
- New Zealand Open, defunct
- Auckland International, defunct
- Waikato International, defunct
