= 2002 Oceania Badminton Championships =

Tournament details
- Dates: 7 – 12 May
- Nations: 5
- Venue: National Gymnasium
- Location: Suva, Fiji

Champions
- Men's singles: (New Zealand) Geoff Bellingham
- Women's singles: (Australia) Lenny Permana
- Men's doubles: (Australia) Peter Blackburn (Australia) Murray Hocking
- Women's doubles: (New Zealand) Tammy Jenkins (New Zealand) Rhona Robertson
- Mixed doubles: (New Zealand) Daniel Shirley (New Zealand) Sara Runesten-Petersen

The 2002 Oceania Badminton Championships was the third edition of the Oceania Badminton Championships. The tournament was held from 7 to 12 May at the National Gymnasium in Suva, Fiji. Five nations competed in the championships.

== Medal summary ==
=== Medalists ===
Event	Gold	Silver	Bronze
Men's singles	(New Zealand) Geoff Bellingham	(New Zealand) Nick Hall	(Australia) Nathan Malpass
Men's singles	(New Zealand) Geoff Bellingham	(New Zealand) Nick Hall	(Australia) Stuart Brehaut
Women's singles	(Australia) Lenny Permana	(New Zealand) Nicole Gordon	(Australia) Kellie Lucas
Women's singles	(Australia) Lenny Permana	(New Zealand) Nicole Gordon	(Australia) Rayoni Head
Men's doubles	(Australia) Peter Blackburn (Australia) Murray Hocking	(Australia) Ashley Brehaut (Australia) Travis Denney	(New Zealand) John Gordon (New Zealand) Daniel Shirley
Men's doubles	(Australia) Peter Blackburn (Australia) Murray Hocking	(Australia) Ashley Brehaut (Australia) Travis Denney	(Australia) Boyd Cooper (Australia) Nathan Malpass
Women's doubles	(New Zealand) Tammy Jenkins (New Zealand) Rhona Robertson	(Australia) Rhonda Cator (Australia) Kate Wilson-Smith	(Australia) Jane Crabtree (Australia) Kellie Lucas
Women's doubles	(New Zealand) Tammy Jenkins (New Zealand) Rhona Robertson	(Australia) Rhonda Cator (Australia) Kate Wilson-Smith	(New Zealand) Nicole Gordon (New Zealand) Sara Runesten-Petersen
Mixed doubles	(New Zealand) Daniel Shirley (New Zealand) Sara Runesten-Petersen	(Australia) Travis Denney (Australia) Kate Wilson-Smith	(New Zealand) John Moody (New Zealand) Lianne Shirley
Mixed doubles	(New Zealand) Daniel Shirley (New Zealand) Sara Runesten-Petersen	(Australia) Travis Denney (Australia) Kate Wilson-Smith	(Australia) Craig Cooper (Australia) Tammy Jenkins
Mixed team	Australia	New Zealand	Fiji

=== Medal table ===
* Host nation (Fiji)

Rank	Nation	Gold	Silver	Bronze	Total
1	Australia	3	3	7	13
2	New Zealand	3	3	3	9
3	Fiji*	0	0	1	1
Totals (3 entries)		6	6	11	23

== Individual results ==
=== Men's singles ===
Semi-finals
(New Zealand) Geoff Bellingham	7	4	3	7	7
(Australia) Stuart Brehaut	2	7	7	3	4
(Australia) Nathan Malpass	2	4	1
(New Zealand) Nick Hall	7	7	7

Final
(Australia) Rio Suryana	7	6	7	7
(New Zealand) Geoff Bellingham	1	8	2	0

=== Women's singles ===
Semi-finals
(Australia) Kellie Lucas	1	1	4
(Australia) Lenny Permana	7	7	7
(New Zealand) Nicole Gordon	7	4	7	7
(Australia) Rayoni Head	4	7	3	5

Final
(Australia) Lenny Permana	7	7	8
(New Zealand) Nicole Gordon	2	1	6

=== Men's doubles ===
Semi-finals
(New Zealand) John Gordon (New Zealand) Daniel Shirley	7	5	6	7	5
(Australia) Peter Blackburn (Australia) Murray Hocking	4	7	8	5	7
(Australia) Boyd Cooper (Australia) Nathan Malpass	1	8	1	4
(Australia) Ashley Brehaut (Australia) Travis Denney	7	6	7	7

Final
(Australia) Peter Blackburn (Australia) Murray Hocking	7	7	7	7
(Australia) Ashley Brehaut (Australia) Travis Denney	4	8	5	1

=== Women's doubles ===
Semi-finals
(New Zealand) Tammy Jenkins (New Zealand) Rhona Robertson	7	7	7
(Australia) Kellie Lucas (Australia) Jane Crabtree	1	2	3
(New Zealand) Nicole Gordon (New Zealand) Sara Runesten-Petersen	8	3	3	5
(Australia) Rhonda Cator (Australia) Kate Wilson-Smith	7	7	7	7

Final
(New Zealand) Tammy Jenkins (New Zealand) Rhona Robertson	7	7	2	7
(Australia) Rhonda Cator (Australia) Kate Wilson-Smith	3	2	7	5

=== Mixed doubles ===
Semi-finals
(New Zealand) Daniel Shirley (New Zealand) Sara Runesten-Petersen	7	7	5	7
(New Zealand) Craig Cooper (New Zealand) Tammy Jenkins	3	2	7	1
(New Zealand) John Moody (New Zealand) Lianne Shirley	3	0	3
(Australia) Travis Denney (Australia) Kate Wilson-Smith	7	7	7

Final
(New Zealand) Daniel Shirley (New Zealand) Sara Runesten-Petersen	7	3	7	7
(Australia) Travis Denney (Australia) Kate Wilson-Smith	0	7	4	3

== Team event ==
=== Standings ===
Pos	Team	Pld	W	L	MF	MA	MD	GF	GA	GD	PF	PA	PD	Pts	
1	Australia	4	4	0	18	2	+16	55	8	+47	406	142	+264	4	Gold medal
2	New Zealand	4	3	1	17	3	+14	53	10	+43	411	145	+266	3	Silver medal
3	Fiji (H)	4	2	2	14	11	+3	29	36	−7	273	317	−44	2	Bronze medal
4	New Caledonia	4	1	3	6	14	−8	21	44	−23	220	348	−128	1	
5	Samoa	4	0	4	0	20	−20	0	60	−60	63	421	−358	0	

Source: Badminton Oceania
(H) Host

=== Australia vs New Caledonia ===
Australia
5
National Gymnasium
7 May 2002

New Caledonia
0

			1	2	3	4	5
1	(Australia) (New Caledonia)	Stuart Brehaut; Thommy Sargito	7; 0	7; 0	7; 3
2	(Australia) (New Caledonia)	Kellie Lucas; Valérie Sarengat	7; 1	7; 1	7; 0
3	(Australia) (New Caledonia)	Ashley Brehaut / Travis Denney; Fabien Kaddour / Florent Mathey	7; 2	7; 3	7; 2
4	(Australia) (New Caledonia)	Rhonda Cator / Kate Wilson-Smith; Johanna Kou / Cécile Sarengat	7; 1	7; 0	7; 1
5	(Australia) (New Caledonia)	Travis Denney / Kate Wilson-Smith; Thommy Sargito / Valérie Sarengat	7; 0	7; 2	7; 1

=== New Zealand vs Fiji ===
New Zealand
5
National Gymnasium
7 May 2002

Fiji
0

			1	2	3	4	5
1	(New Zealand) (Fiji)	Nick Hall; Burty Molia	7; 3	7; 3	7; 4
2	(New Zealand) (Fiji)	Rhona Robertson; Karyn Whiteside	7; 0	7; 0	7; 5
3	(New Zealand) (Fiji)	John Gordon / Daniel Shirley; Damien Ah Sam / Burty Molia	7; 2	7; 1	7; 0
4	(New Zealand) (Fiji)	Nicole Gordon / Sara Runesten-Petersen; Felicitas Matlane Cheer / Karyn Whiteside	7; 2	7; 1	7; 1
5	(New Zealand) (Fiji)	Daniel Shirley / Sara Runesten-Petersen; Eric Yuen / Felicitas Matlane Cheer	7; 1	7; 1	7; 2

=== Australia vs Fiji ===
Australia
5
National Gymnasium
8 May 2002

Fiji
0

			1	2	3	4	5
1	(Australia) (Fiji)	Nathan Malpass; Burty Molia	7; 1	7; 2	7; 2
2	(Australia) (Fiji)	Lenny Permana; Karyn Whiteside	7; 4	7; 0	7; 1
3	(Australia) (Fiji)	Peter Blackburn / Boyd Cooper; Burty Molia / Filivai Molia	7; 4	7; 2	7; 1
4	(Australia) (Fiji)	Rhonda Cator / Kate Wilson-Smith; Felicitas Matlane Cheer / Karyn Whiteside	7; 1	7; 0	7; 1
5	(Australia) (Fiji)	Travis Denny / Kate Wilson-Smith; Damien Ah Sam / Felicitas Matlane Cheer	7; 0	7; 0	7; 0

=== Fiji vs Samoa ===
Fiji
5
National Gymnasium
8 May 2002

Samoa
0

			1	2	3	4	5
1	(Fiji) (Samoa)	Bill Kumar / Eric Yuen; Tupu Mauala / Alain Pose	7; 1	8; 6	7; 5
2	(Fiji) (Samoa)	Felicitas Matlane Cheer; Alofou Fiti	7; 0	7; 2	7; 1
3	(Fiji) (Samoa)	Eric Yuen / Karyn Whiteside; Alain Pose / Ruby Slade	7; 3	7; 0	7; 2
4	(Fiji) (Samoa)	Damien Ah Sam; Tupu Mauala	7; 1	7; 0	7; 0
5	(Fiji) (Samoa)	Felicitas Matlane Cheer / Josifini Tuivaga; Alofou Fiti / Ruby Slade	7; 1	7; 2	7; 2

=== New Zealand vs New Caledonia ===
New Zealand
5
National Gymnasium
8 May 2002

New Caledonia
0

			1	2	3	4	5
1	(New Zealand) (New Caledonia)	Nicole Gordon; Johanna Kou	7; 0	7; 0	7; 0
2	(New Zealand) (New Caledonia)	Geoff Bellingham; Sebastian Arias	7; 1	7; 1	7; 1
3	(New Zealand) (New Caledonia)	Daniel Shirley / Sara Runesten-Petersen; Florent Mathey / Cécile Sarengat	7; 0	7; 1	7; 0
4	(New Zealand) (New Caledonia)	Tammy Jenkins / Rhonda Robertson; Johanna Kou / Valérie Sarengat	7; 2	7; 2	7; 0
5	(New Zealand) (New Caledonia)	Geoff Bellingham / Chris Blair; Florian Paladini / Thommy Sargito	7; 0	7; 4	7; 5

=== New Zealand vs Samoa ===
New Zealand
5
National Gymnasium
9 May 2002

Samoa
0

			1	2	3	4	5
1	(New Zealand) (Samoa)	Nicole Gordon / Sara Runesten-Petersen; Alofou Fiti / Ruby Slade	7; 0	7; 0	7; 0
2	(New Zealand) (Samoa)	John Gordon / Daniel Shirley; Tupu Mauala / Alain Pose	7; 3	8; 0	7; 2
3	(New Zealand) (Samoa)	Rhonda Robertson; Ruby Slade	7; 0	7; 0	7; 0
4	(New Zealand) (Samoa)	Eric Yuen / Karyn Whiteside; Tupu Mauala / Alofou Fiti	7; 1	7; 1	7; 1
5	(New Zealand) (Samoa)	Nick Hall; Alain Pose	7; 1	7; 0	7; 0

=== New Caledonia vs Fiji ===
New Caledonia
1
National Gymnasium
9 May 2002

Fiji
4

			1	2	3	4	5
1	(New Caledonia) (Fiji)	Florent Mathey / Cécile Sarengat; Filivai Molia / Felicitas Matlane Cheer	6; 8	7; 0	3; 7	5; 7
2	(New Caledonia) (Fiji)	Valérie Sarengat; Karyn Whiteside	0; 7	4; 7	1; 7
3	(New Caledonia) (Fiji)	Thommy Sargito; Burty Molia	4; 7	7; 2	1; 7	6; 8
4	(New Caledonia) (Fiji)	Johanna Kou / Cécile Sarengat; Felicitas Matlane Cheer / Karyn Whiteside	3; 7	8; 7	4; 7	1; 7
5	(New Caledonia) (Fiji)	Fabien Kaddour / Florent Mathey; Burty Molia / Filivai Molia	0; 7	0; 7	7; 4	7; 5	7; 5

=== Australia vs Samoa ===
Australia
5
National Gymnasium
9 May 2002

Samoa
0

			1	2	3	4	5
1	(Australia) (Samoa)	Murray Hocking / Tania Luiz; Alain Pose / Ruby Slade	7; 0	7; 2	7; 0
2	(Australia) (Samoa)	Stuart Brehaut; Tupu Mauala	7; 0	7; 0	7; 1
3	(Australia) (Samoa)	Rayoni Head; Alofou Fiti	7; 0	7; 0	7; 1
4	(Australia) (Samoa)	Ashley Brehaut / Travis Denney; Tupu Mauala / Alain Pose	7; 0	8; 2	7; 2
5	(Australia) (Samoa)	Jane Crabtree / Kellie Lucas; Alofou Fiti / Ruby Slade	7; 0	7; 1	7; 1

=== New Caledonia vs Samoa ===
New Caledonia
5
National Gymnasium
9 May 2002

Samoa
0

			1	2	3	4	5
1	(New Caledonia) (Samoa)	Sebastian Arias; Alain Pose	7; 0	7; 0	7; 3
2	(New Caledonia) (Samoa)	Fabien Kaddour / Johanna Kou; Tupu Mauala / Alofou Fiti	7; 0	7; 0	7; 1
3	(New Caledonia) (Samoa)	Valérie Sarengat; Ruby Slade	7; 0	7; 0	7; 0
4	(New Caledonia) (Samoa)	Florian Paladini / Thommy Sargito; Tupu Mauala / Alain Pose	7; 2	8; 6	7; 4
5	(New Caledonia) (Samoa)	Johanna Kou / Cécile Sarengat; Alofou Fiti / Ruby Slade	7; 0	7; 0	7; 0

=== Australia vs New Zealand ===
Australia
3
National Gymnasium
9 May 2002

New Zealand
2

			1	2	3	4	5
1	(Australia) (New Zealand)	Travis Denney / Kate Wilson-Smith; Daniel Shirley / Sara Runesten-Petersen	0; 7	7; 5	5; 7	8; 6	8; 6
2	(Australia) (New Zealand)	Nathan Malpass; Geoff Bellingham	1; 7	1; 7	4; 7
3	(Australia) (New Zealand)	Lenny Permana; Nicole Gordon	7; 4	8; 6	7; 1
4	(Australia) (New Zealand)	Peter Blackburn / Boyd Cooper; John Gordon / Chris Blair	8; 6	7; 0	7; 3
5	(Australia) (New Zealand)	Rhonda Cator / Kate Wilson-Smith; Tammy Jenkins / Rhona Robertson	3; 7	7; 3	0; 7	3; 7
