= 2007 New Zealand Open Grand Prix =

Tournament details
- Dates: May 14, 2007 – May 20, 2007
- Edition: 16th
- Level: Grand Prix
- Total prize money: US$50,000
- Venue: Auckland Badminton Hall
- Location: Auckland, New Zealand

Champions
- Men's singles: (Indonesia) Andre Kurniawan Tedjono
- Women's singles: (Hong Kong) Zhou Mi
- Men's doubles: (Malaysia) Chan Chong Ming (Malaysia) Hoon Thien How
- Women's doubles: (Japan) Ikue Tatani (Japan) Aya Wakisaka
- Mixed doubles: (Indonesia) Devin Lahardi Fitriawan (Indonesia) Lita Nurlita

The 2007 New Zealand Open Grand Prix (officially known as the KLRC New Zealand Open 2007 for sponsorship reasons) was a badminton tournament which took place in Auckland, New Zealand from 14 to 20 May 2007. It had a total purse of $50,000.

== Tournament ==
The 2007 New Zealand Open Grand Prix was the second tournament of the 2007 BWF Grand Prix Gold and Grand Prix and also part of the New Zealand Open championships which has been held since 1990. This tournament was organized by the Badminton New Zealand and sanctioned by the BWF.

=== Venue ===
This international tournament was held at Auckland Badminton Hall in Auckland, New Zealand.

=== Point distribution ===
Below is the point distribution for each phase of the tournament based on the BWF points system for the BWF Grand Prix event.

Winner	Runner-up	3/4	5/8	9/16	17/32	33/64
5,500	4,680	3,850	3,030	2,110	1,290	510

=== Prize money ===
The total prize money for this tournament was US$50,000. Distribution of prize money was in accordance with BWF regulations.

Event	Winner	Finals	Semi-finals	Quarter-finals	Last 16
Singles	$3,750	$1,900	$725	$300	$175
Doubles	$3,950	$1,900	$700	$362.5	$187.5

== Men's singles ==
=== Seeds ===
1. (England) Andrew Smith (quarter-finals)
2. (Malaysia) Lee Tsuen Seng (semi-finals)
3. (Malaysia) Sairul Amar Ayob (third round)
4. (Malaysia) Roslin Hashim (quarter-finals)
5. (Hong Kong) Chan Yan Kit (quarter-finals)
6. (New Zealand) John Moody (second round)
7. (Hong Kong) Ng Wei (third round)
8. (Malaysia) Yeoh Kay Bin (semi-finals)

=== Finals ===
Semi-finals
5/8	(Malaysia) Yeoh Kay Bin	18	15
(Indonesia) Andre Kurniawan Tedjono	21	21
(Malaysia) Wong Choong Hann	21	18	21
2	(Malaysia) Lee Tsuen Seng	11	21	12

Final
(Indonesia) Andre Kurniawan Tedjono	13	21	21
(Malaysia) Wong Choong Hann	21	18	14

=== Top half ===
==== Section 1 ====
First Round
(Iran) K Meharabi	21	21
(New Zealand) B Seguin	12	14
(Indonesia) A Y Wahyu Hartanto	21	21
(New Zealand) J Liu	10	4

Second Round
1	(England) A Smith	21	21
(New Zealand) J F Lee	7	10
(New Zealand) T Chow	6	7
(Iran) K Meharabi	21	21
5/8	(Malaysia) Yeoh K B	21	21
(New Zealand) S Koo	12	7
(New Zealand) A Chan	21	21
(Indonesia) A Y Wahyu Hartanto	9	17

Third Round
1	(England) A Smith	22	21
(Iran) K Meharabi	20	7
5/8	(Malaysia) Yeoh K B	21	21
(New Zealand) A Chan	19	17

Quarter-finals
1	(England) A Smith	11	5
5/8	(Malaysia) Yeoh K B	21	21

==== Section 2 ====
First Round
(New Zealand) D Tang	12	12
(Australia) S Gomez	21	21
(Indonesia) A K Tedjono	21	21
(New Zealand) ZH Zou	12	13
(Japan) J Takemura	21	21
(New Zealand) D Nuttall	13	8

Second Round
3/4	(Malaysia) R Hashim	w	/	o
(Indonesia) A Adityawarman
(New Zealand) W Bok	4	2
(Australia) S Gomez	21	21
5/8	(Hong Kong) Ng W	21	21
(New Zealand) O Leydon-Davis	7	8
(Indonesia) A K Tedjono	21	21
(Japan) J Takemura	18	16

Third Round
3/4	(Malaysia) R Hashim	21	21
(Australia) S Gomez	18	11
5/8	(Hong Kong) Ng W	15	4
(Indonesia) A K Tedjono	21	21

Quarter-finals
3/4	(Malaysia) R Hashim	17	19
(Indonesia) A K Tedjono	21	21

=== Bottom half ===
==== Section 3 ====
First Round
(Slovakia) M Matejka	21	21
(New Zealand) K Dennerly-Minturn	17	13
(New Zealand) L Charlesworth	10	11
(Australia) J Tho	21	21
(New Zealand) J Wu	15	15
(Australia) B Walklate	21	21

Second Round
(Slovakia) M Matejka	14	10
(Australia) J Tho	21	21
(Malaysia) Wong C H	21	21
5/8	(New Zealand) J Moody	13	13
(Australia) B Walklate	21	13	14
(Indonesia) A Yunus	18	21	21
(Portugal) M Vasconcelos	14	19
3/4	(Malaysia) S A Ayob	21	21

Third Round
(Australia) J Tho	15	14
(Malaysia) Wong C H	21	21
(Indonesia) A Yunus	15	21	22
(Malaysia) S A Ayob	21	17	20

Quarter-finals
(Malaysia) Wong C H	16	21	22
(Indonesia) A Yunus	21	13	20

==== Section 4 ====
First Round
(Spain) J A Crespo	21	21
(New Zealand) P Tayalan	13	6
(Malaysia) I Saman	21	21
(New Zealand) E Haggo	10	16
(Italy) K Raffeiner	21	21
(New Zealand) V Vazifdar	13	8

Second Round
(Spain) J A Crespo	13	11
(Malaysia) I Saman	21	21
(New Zealand) B Miller	8	7
5/8	(Hong Kong) Chan Y K	21	21
(Italy) K Raffeiner	21	21
(New Zealand) A Dhoray	5	6
(England) N Kidd	10	13
2	(Malaysia) Lee T S	21	21

Third Round
(Malaysia) I Saman	13	21	21
5/8	(Hong Kong) Chan Y K	21	18	23
(Italy) K Raffeiner	8	15
2	(Malaysia) Lee T S	21	21

Quarter-finals
5/8	(Hong Kong) Chan Y K	13	17
2	(Malaysia) Lee T S	21	21

== Women's singles ==
=== Seeds ===
1. (France) Pi Hongyan (semi-finals)
2. (Hong Kong) Yip Pui Yin (semi-finals)
3. (Australia) Huang Chia-chi (withdrew)
4. (Japan) Chie Umezu (final)
5. (England) Tracey Hallam (quarter-finals)
6. (New Zealand) Rachel Hindley (third round)
7. (Malaysia) Sutheaswari Mudukasan (second round)
8. (Japan) Kanako Yonekura (second round)

=== Finals ===
Semi-finals
1	(France) Pi Hongyan	5	21	13
(Hong Kong) Zhou Mi	21	19	21
3/4	(Japan) Chie Umezu	11	21	21
2	(Hong Kong) Yip Pui Yin	21	17	17

Final
(Hong Kong) Zhou Mi	21	21
3/4	(Japan) Chie Umezu	13	10

=== Top half ===
==== Section 1 ====
First Round
(Fiji) K Whiteside	3	8
(Singapore) Chen JY	21	21
(Iceland) R Ingólfsdóttir
(Japan) N Iwata	w	/	o
(Republic of Ireland) R Kilkenny	7	14
(Japan) Y Wakita	21	21
(Estonia) K Tolmoff	19	21	21
(New Zealand) J Jonggowisastro	21	11	9
(New Zealand) E Ang	5	9
(Indonesia) M E Christina	21	21

Second Round
1	(France) Pi HY	21	21
(Singapore) Gu J	11	8
(Singapore) Chen JY	16	19
(Japan) N Iwata	21	21
5/8	(New Zealand) R Hindley	21	21
(Japan) Y Wakita	16	16
(Estonia) K Tolmoff	18	17
(Indonesia) M E Christina	21	21

Third Round
1	(France) Pi HY	21	21
(Japan) N Iwata	9	12
5/8	(New Zealand) R Hindley	20	21
(Indonesia) M E Christina	22	23

Quarter-finals
1	(France) Pi HY	21	21
(Indonesia) M E Christina	14	10

==== Section 2 ====
First Round
(Hong Kong) Zhou M	21	21
(New Zealand) M O'Connor	2	1
(Indonesia) F Ratnasari
(New Zealand) A Angarra	w	/	o
(Indonesia) R Y Pungkasari	21	21
(New Zealand) E Chapple	12	9
(Vietnam) Lê Ngọc N N	16	12
(Japan) Y Hataya	21	21
(South Korea) Jun J-y	21	21
(New Zealand) K Gregory	5	7
(New Zealand) Vina	21	21
(Australia) Cheah F-m	11	12

Second Round
3/4	(Australia) Huang H-c
(Hong Kong) Zhou M	w	/	o
(New Zealand) A Angarra	10	9
(Indonesia) R Y Pungkasari	21	21
5/8	(Japan) K Yonekura	15	18
(Japan) Y Hataya	21	21
(South Korea) Jun J-y	21	21
(New Zealand) Vina	4	8

Third Round
(Hong Kong) Zhou M	21	19	21
(Indonesia) R Y Pungkasari	10	21	16
(Japan) Y Hataya	20	15
(South Korea) Jun J-y	22	21

Quarter-finals
(Hong Kong) Zhou M	21	21
(South Korea) Jun J-y	16	14

=== Bottom half ===
==== Section 3 ====
First Round
(Singapore) S M Sari	21	21
(New Zealand) C Chapple	17	12
(New Zealand) J Chiang	3	7
(Singapore) Fu MT	21	21
(Singapore) Zhang BW	21	16	12
(South Korea) Jang S-y	17	21	21
(Singapore) F Liu	21	21
(Australia) A Lubransky	1	2
(Indonesia) P Z Bernadeth	21	21
(New Zealand) M Chan	5	10
(Singapore) Yao L	w	/	o
(Indonesia) S Kurniawan

Second Round
(Singapore) S M Sari	14	12
(Singapore) Fu MT	21	21
(South Korea) Jang S-y	21	21
5/8	(Malaysia) S Mudukasan	12	9
(Singapore) F Liu	18	10
(Indonesia) P Z Bernadeth	21	21
(Singapore) Yao L	8	15
3/4	(Japan) C Umezu	21	21

Third Round
(Singapore) Fu MT	22	13	21
(South Korea) Jang S-y	20	21	13
(Indonesia) P Z Bernadeth	23	14
3/4	(Japan) C Umezu	25	21

Quarter-finals
(Singapore) Fu MT	16	13
3/4	(Japan) C Umezu	21	21

==== Section 4 ====
First Round
(New Zealand) D Barry	10	10
(Indonesia) Aprilia Y	21	21
(New Zealand) M Leviana	21	21
(Australia) E Carroll	12	16
(New Zealand) K Tayalan	3	4
(France) W Rahmawati	21	21
(New Zealand) M Chan	21	21
(Samoa) H Mafaufau	11	4
(Indonesia) Y K Putri
(Denmark) L Isberg	w	/	o
(New Zealand) S Cheng	5	12
(Chinese Taipei) Huang C-h	21	21

Second Round
(Indonesia) Aprilia Y	21	21
(New Zealand) M Leviana	7	4
(France) W Rahmawati	6	16
5/8	(England) T Hallam	21	21
(New Zealand) M Chan	17	21	21
(Denmark) L Isberg	21	17	10
(Chinese Taipei) Huang C-h	18	21	17
2	(Hong Kong) Yip P Y	21	15	21

Third Round
(Indonesia) Aprilia Y	12	12
5/8	(England) T Hallam	21	21
(New Zealand) M Chan	15	15
2	(Hong Kong) Yip P Y	21	21

Quarter-finals
5/8	(England) T Hallam	21	12	19
2	(Hong Kong) Yip P Y	15	21	21

== Men's doubles ==
=== Seeds ===
1. (Hong Kong) Albertus Susanto Njoto / Yohan Hadikusumo Wiratama (final)
2. (Australia) Aji Basuki Sindoro / Ashley Brehaut (second round)
3. (France) Svetoslav Stoyanov / Mihail Popov (second round)
4. (Australia) Glenn Warfe / Ross Smith (second round)

=== Finals ===
Semi-finals
1	(Hong Kong) Albertus Susanto Njoto (Hong Kong) Yohan Hadikusumo Wiratama	w	/	o
(New Zealand) John Moody (New Zealand) Alan Chan
(Malaysia) Chan Chong Ming (Malaysia) Hoon Thien How	17	21	21
(Indonesia) Anggun Nugroho (Indonesia) Devin Lahardi Fitriawan	21	11	7

Final
1	(Hong Kong) Albertus Susanto Njoto (Hong Kong) Yohan Hadikusumo Wiratama	14	22	11
(Malaysia) Chan Chong Ming (Malaysia) Hoon Thien How	21	20	21

=== Top half ===
==== Section 1 ====
First Round
(Malaysia) M Z Abdul Latif (Malaysia) M F Mohd Tazari
(New Zealand) H Fu (New Zealand) V Duong	w	/	o
(New Zealand) L Charlesworth (New Zealand) T Chow	8	11
(New Zealand) O Leydon-Davis (New Zealand) B Seguin	21	21

Second Round
1	(Hong Kong) A S Njoto (Hong Kong) Y H Wiratama	21	21
(New Zealand) H Fu (New Zealand) V Duong	6	7
(Indonesia) B Septano (Indonesia) M Ahsan	21	21
(New Zealand) O Leydon-Davis (New Zealand) B Seguin	9	9

Quarter-finals
1	(Hong Kong) A S Njoto (Hong Kong) Y H Wiratama	26	22
(Indonesia) B Septano (Indonesia) M Ahsan	24	20

==== Section 2 ====
First Round
(New Zealand) J Moody (New Zealand) A Chan	21	21
(New Zealand) B Miller (New Zealand) D Tang	8	15
(New Zealand) P Tayalan (New Zealand) A Tse	9	14
(New Zealand) I Coldstream (New Zealand) N Monaghan	21	21
(New Zealand) J Chek (New Zealand) J Liu	17	14
(Australia) C Whitehead (Australia) M Prior	21	21

Second Round
3/4	(Australia) G Warfe (Australia) R Smith	22	19	19
(New Zealand) J Moody (New Zealand) A Chan	20	21	21
(New Zealand) I Coldstream (New Zealand) N Monaghan	14	24
(Australia) C Whitehead (Australia) M Prior	21	26

Quarter-finals
(New Zealand) J Moody (New Zealand) A Chan	21	21
(Australia) C Whitehead (Australia) M Prior	16	15

=== Bottom half ===
==== Section 3 ====
First Round
(New Zealand) H Tam (New Zealand) N Hannam	12	13
(Indonesia) Fernando K (Indonesia) C. J. Subakti	21	21
(New Zealand) D Nuttall (New Zealand) S Willins	5	5
(Malaysia) Chan C M (Malaysia) Hoon T H	21	21
(New Zealand) A Dhoray (New Zealand) E Haggo	9	16
(Hong Kong) Hui W H (Hong Kong) T P Alroy	21	21

Second Round
(Indonesia) Fernando K (Indonesia) C. J. Subakti	14	14
(Malaysia) Chan C M (Malaysia) Hoon T H	21	21
(Hong Kong) Hui W H (Hong Kong) T P Alroy	16	24	21
3/4	(France) S Stoyanov (France) M Popov	21	22	9

Quarter-finals
(Malaysia) Chan C M (Malaysia) Hoon T H	21	21
(Hong Kong) Hui W H (Hong Kong) T P Alroy	11	16

==== Section 4 ====
First Round
(New Zealand) P Horne (New Zealand) R Purser	21	15	21
(New Zealand) J Liu (New Zealand) V Vazifdar	19	21	15
(New Zealand) D Forrest (New Zealand) W Bok	14	18
(Indonesia) A Nugroho (Indonesia) D L Fitriawan	21	21

Second Round
(New Zealand) P Horne (New Zealand) R Purser	22	17	12
(New Zealand) J Wu (New Zealand) K Dennerly-Minturn	20	21	21
(Indonesia) A Nugroho (Indonesia) D L Fitriawan	17	21	21
2	(Australia) A B Sindoro (Australia) A Brehaut	21	17	18

Quarter-finals
(New Zealand) J Wu (New Zealand) K Dennerly-Minturn	11	10
(Indonesia) A Nugroho (Indonesia) D L Fitriawan	21	21

== Women's doubles ==
=== Seeds ===
1. (Malaysia) Lim Pek Siah / Joanne Quay (second round)
2. (France) Élodie Eymard / Weny Rahmawati (quarter-finals)
3. (Singapore) Vanessa Neo / Shinta Mulia Sari (second round)
4. (England) Suzanne Rayappan / Jenny Wallwork (withdrew)

=== Finals ===
Semi-finals
(Indonesia) Meiliana Jauhari (Indonesia) Shendy Puspa Irawati	21	21
(Japan) Seiko Yamada (Japan) Yu Wakita	19	10
(Japan) Ikue Tatani (Japan) Aya Wakisaka	21	21
(Singapore) Frances Liu (Singapore) Yao Lei	15	19

Final
(Indonesia) Meiliana Jauhari (Indonesia) Shendy Puspa Irawati	17	21	16
(Japan) Ikue Tatani (Japan) Aya Wakisaka	21	15	21

=== Top half ===
==== Section 1 ====
First Round
(Indonesia) M Jauhari (Indonesia) S P Irawati	21	21
(New Zealand) D Fu (New Zealand) A Wagner	5	18
(Denmark) L Isberg (Peru) D Rivera	21	16	14
(New Zealand) M Chan (New Zealand) R Hindley	18	21	21
(New Zealand) C Moody (Vietnam) Lê Ngọc N N	21	18	21
(New Zealand) B Hill (New Zealand) E Rodgers	17	21	13

Second Round
1	(Malaysia) Lim P S (Malaysia) J Quay	23	18	16
(Indonesia) M Jauhari (Indonesia) S P Irawati	21	21	21
(New Zealand) M Chan (New Zealand) R Hindley	21	21
(New Zealand) C Moody (Vietnam) Lê Ngọc N N	13	16

Quarter-finals
(Indonesia) M Jauhari (Indonesia) S P Irawati	21	21
(New Zealand) M Chan (New Zealand) R Hindley	11	16

==== Section 2 ====
First Round
3/4	(England) S Rayappan (England) J Wallwork
(New Zealand) J Jonggowisastro (New Zealand) E Chapple
(New Zealand) R Flavell (New Zealand) D Cranston	13	14
(Japan) S Yamada (Japan) Y Wakita	21	21
(Japan) N Okuma (Japan) M Kanagami	21	21
(New Zealand) E Ang (New Zealand) M Leviana	10	7
(Singapore) Gu J (Singapore) Zhang BW	21	21
(Australia) S Dobson (Australia) T Luiz	18	16

Second Round
(New Zealand) J Jonggowisastro (New Zealand) E Chapple	13	13
(Japan) S Yamada (Japan) Y Wakita	21	21
(Japan) N Okuma (Japan) M Kanagami	21	21
(Singapore) Gu J (Singapore) Zhang BW	19	12

Quarter-finals
(Japan) S Yamada (Japan) Y Wakita	21	21
(Japan) N Okuma (Japan) M Kanagami	13	14

=== Bottom half ===
==== Section 3 ====
First Round
(Indonesia) N K Maheswari (Indonesia) L Nurlita	20	21	18
(Japan) I Tatani (Japan) A Wakisaka	22	18	21
(Singapore) Chen JY (Singapore) Fu MT	21	21
(Australia) E Carroll (Australia) L McKenzie	16	12
(New Zealand) S Cheng (New Zealand) K Gregory	8	9
(Hong Kong) Chau H W (Hong Kong) Koon W C	21	21
(New Zealand) J Chiang (New Zealand) A Lubransky	6	7
3/4	(Singapore) V Neo (Singapore) S M Sari	21	21

Second Round
(Japan) I Tatani (Japan) A Wakisaka	21	21
(Singapore) Chen JY (Singapore) Fu MT	18	2
(Hong Kong) Chau H W (Hong Kong) Koon W C	21	21
3/4	(Singapore) V Neo (Singapore) S M Sari	18	14

Quarter-finals
(Japan) I Tatani (Japan) A Wakisaka	21	21
(Hong Kong) Chau H W (Hong Kong) Koon W C	17	11

==== Section 4 ====
First Round
(Singapore) F Liu (Singapore) Yao L	23	21
(Malaysia) Woon K W (Malaysia) Goh L Y	21	15
(Malaysia) Wong W S (Malaysia) Chor H Y	21	21
(New Zealand) C Chapple (New Zealand) K Tayalan	12	14
(New Zealand) M Chan (New Zealand) D Barry	21	21
(Samoa) H Mafaufau (New Zealand) M O'Connor	8	13

Second Round
(Singapore) F Liu (Singapore) Yao L	17	21	21
(Malaysia) Wong W S (Malaysia) Chor H Y	21	14	17
(New Zealand) M Chan (New Zealand) D Barry	7	10
2	(France) É Eymard (France) W Rahmawati	21	21

Quarter-finals
(Singapore) F Liu (Singapore) Yao L	21	21
2	(France) É Eymard (France) W Rahmawati	9	17

== Mixed doubles ==
=== Seeds ===
1. (New Zealand) Daniel Shirley / (Malaysia) Joanne Quay (second round)
2. (France) Svetoslav Stoyanov / Élodie Eymard (semi-finals)
3. (Australia) Ross Smith / Tania Luiz (second round)
4. (Australia) Glenn Warfe / Susan Dobson (quarter-finals)
5. (Hong Kong) Tanama Putra Alroy / Chau Hoi Wah (semi-finals)
6. (Indonesia) Devin Lahardi Fitriawan / Lita Nurlita (champions)
7. (Indonesia) Anggun Nugroho / Nitya Krishinda Maheswari (final)
8. (Australia) Benjamin Walklate / Erin Carroll (quarter-finals)

=== Finals ===
Semi-finals
5/8	(Hong Kong) Tanama Putra Alroy (Hong Kong) Chau Hoi Wah	9	15
5/8	(Indonesia) Devin Lahardi Fitriawan (Indonesia) Lita Nurlita	21	21
5/8	(Indonesia) Anggun Nugroho (Indonesia) Nitya Krishinda Maheswari	21	21
2	(France) Svetoslav Stoyanov (France) Élodie Eymard	17	14

Final
5/8	(Indonesia) Devin Lahardi Fitriawan (Indonesia) Lita Nurlita	21	21
5/8	(Indonesia) Anggun Nugroho (Indonesia) Nitya Krishinda Maheswari	16	15

=== Top half ===
==== Section 1 ====
First Round
1	(New Zealand) D Shirley (Malaysia) J Quay	21	21
(New Zealand) O Leydon-Davis (New Zealand) A Lubransky	8	5
(New Zealand) C Cooper (New Zealand) R Flavell	21	21
(New Zealand) W Bok (New Zealand) E Ang	12	14
5/8	(Hong Kong) T P Alroy (Hong Kong) Chau H W	21	23
(New Zealand) H Tam (New Zealand) D Cranston	10	21
(Spain) J A Crespo (Peru) D Rivera	21	21
(New Zealand) B Miller (New Zealand) S Cheng	6	10

Second Round
1	(New Zealand) D Shirley (Malaysia) J Quay	20	21	16
(New Zealand) C Cooper (New Zealand) R Flavell	22	10	21
5/8	(Hong Kong) T P Alroy (Hong Kong) Chau H W	21	21
(Spain) J A Crespo (Peru) D Rivera	9	10

Quarter-finals
(New Zealand) C Cooper (New Zealand) R Flavell	13	13
5/8	(Hong Kong) T P Alroy (Hong Kong) Chau H W	21	21

==== Section 2 ====
First Round
3/4	(Australia) G Warfe (Australia) S Dobson	21	21
(New Zealand) J Liu (New Zealand) D Fu	12	13
Q	(New Zealand) V Vazifdar (New Zealand) A Wagner	21	26	21
(New Zealand) B Seguin (New Zealand) K Gregory	16	28	18
5/8	(Indonesia) D L Fitriawan (Indonesia) L Nurlita	21	21
(New Zealand) E Haggo (New Zealand) J Jonggowisastro	6	9
SUB	(Malaysia) Hoon T H (Malaysia) Goh L Y	21	21
(New Zealand) K Dennerly-Minturn (New Zealand) E Rodgers	11	14

Second Round
3/4	(Australia) G Warfe (Australia) S Dobson	21	21
Q	(New Zealand) V Vazifdar (New Zealand) A Wagner	18	10
5/8	(Indonesia) D L Fitriawan (Indonesia) L Nurlita	21	21
SUB	(Malaysia) Hoon T H (Malaysia) Goh L Y	12	15

Quarter-finals
3/4	(Australia) G Warfe (Australia) S Dobson	10	14
5/8	(Indonesia) D L Fitriawan (Indonesia) L Nurlita	21	21

=== Bottom half ===
==== Section 3 ====
First Round
(Australia) C Whitehead (Australia) L McKenzie	21	19	23
(New Zealand) D Tang (New Zealand) C Chapple	10	21	21
(New Zealand) N Hannam (New Zealand) C Moody	10	17
5/8	(Indonesia) A Nugroho (Indonesia) N K Maheswari	21	21
(New Zealand) L Charlesworth (New Zealand) M O'Connor	5	8
(Malaysia) Tan W K (Malaysia) Woon K W	21	21
(New Zealand) ZH Zou (New Zealand) M Chan	16	14
3/4	(Australia) R Smith (Australia) T Luiz	21	21

Second Round
(Australia) C Whitehead (Australia) L McKenzie	18	7
5/8	(Indonesia) A Nugroho (Indonesia) N K Maheswari	21	21
(Malaysia) Tan W K (Malaysia) Woon K W	21	21
3/4	(Australia) R Smith (Australia) T Luiz	18	16

Quarter-finals
5/8	(Indonesia) A Nugroho (Indonesia) N K Maheswari	21	21
(Malaysia) Tan W K (Malaysia) Woon K W	17	15

==== Section 4 ====
First Round
(Australia) M Prior (Australia) Cheah F-m	15	17
(New Zealand) D Forrest (New Zealand) D Barry	21	21
(New Zealand) A Dhoray (New Zealand) E Chapple	11	8
5/8	(Australia) B Walklate (Australia) E Carroll	21	21
(New Zealand) P Tayalan (New Zealand) K Tayalan	9	3
(Hong Kong) Y H Wiratama (Hong Kong) Koon W C	21	21
(New Zealand) J Wu (New Zealand) B Hill	7	15
2	(France) S Stoyanov (France) É Eymard	21	21

Second Round
(New Zealand) D Forrest (New Zealand) D Barry	17	11
5/8	(Australia) B Walklate (Australia) E Carroll	21	21
(Hong Kong) Y H Wiratama (Hong Kong) Koon W C	18	19
2	(France) S Stoyanov (France) É Eymard	21	21

Quarter-finals
5/8	(Australia) B Walklate (Australia) E Carroll	11	8
2	(France) S Stoyanov (France) É Eymard	21	21

Preceded by 2007 German Open Grand Prix	2007 BWF Grand Prix Gold and Grand Prix; 2007 BWF season	Succeeded by 2007 Thailand Open Grand Prix Gold
