= Kellie Lucas =

Australian badminton player (born 1978)

Personal information
- Born: Kellie Louise Lucas; 31 March 1978 (age 48) Ballarat, Victoria, Australia
- Height: 1.65 m (5 ft 5 in)
- Weight: 61 kg (134 lb)

Sport
- Country: Australia
- Sport: Badminton
- Handedness: Right
- Event: Women's singles & doubles

Women's singles & doubles
- BWF profile
Medal record
Women's badminton
Representing Australia
Commonwealth Games
Bronze medal – third place	1998 Kuala Lumpur	Women's team
Oceania Championships
Bronze medal – third place	2006 Auckland	Women's doubles
Bronze medal – third place	2004 Waitakere City	Women's singles
Bronze medal – third place	2004 Waitakere City	Women's doubles
Bronze medal – third place	2004 Waitakere City	Mixed doubles
Bronze medal – third place	2002 Suva	Women's singles
Bronze medal – third place	2002 Suva	Women's doubles
Bronze medal – third place	1997 North Harbour	Women's doubles
Bronze medal – third place	1997 North Harbour	Mixed doubles
Oceania Mixed Team Championships
Gold medal – first place	2002 Suva	Mixed team
Gold medal – first place	1999 Brisbane	Mixed team
Silver medal – second place	2006 Auckland	Mixed team
Silver medal – second place	2004 Waitakere City	Mixed team
Oceania Women's Team Championships
Gold medal – first place	2004 Ballarat	Women's team
Silver medal – second place	2006 Auckland	Women's team

Kellie Louise Lucas (born 31 March 1978) is an Australian badminton player. She competed at the 2000 Summer Olympics in the women's singles, doubles, and mixed doubles event. She participated at the three consecutive Commonwealth Games in 1998, 2002, and 2006, and winning a women's team bronze medal in 1998. Lucas was crowned Ballarat's Sportswoman of the Year for the fourth time in her sporting career.

== Achievements ==
=== Oceania Championships ===
Women's singles
Year	Venue	Opponent	Score	Result
2004	Waitakere City, New Zealand	(New Zealand) Rebecca Gordon	11–7, 11–13, 0–11	Bronze
2002	Suva, Fiji	(Australia) Lenny Permana	1–7, 1–7, 4–7	Bronze

Women's doubles
Year	Venue	Partner	Opponent	Score	Result
2006	Auckland, New Zealand	(Australia) Kate Wilson-Smith	(New Zealand) Rebecca Bellingham (New Zealand) Rachel Hindley	19–21, 15–21	Bronze
2004	Waitakere City, New Zealand	(Australia) Tania Luiz	(New Zealand) Nicole Gordon (New Zealand) Sara Runesten-Petersen	6–15, 5–15	Bronze
2002	Suva, Fiji	(Australia) Jane Crabtree	(New Zealand) Tammy Jenkins (New Zealand) Rhona Robertson	1–7, 2–7, 3–7	Bronze
1997	North Shore, New Zealand	(Australia) Rhonda Cator	(New Zealand) Li Feng (New Zealand) Sheree Jefferson	2–15, 4–15	Bronze

Mixed doubles
Year	Venue	Partner	Opponent	Score	Result
2004	Waitakere City, New Zealand	(Australia) Boyd Cooper	(Australia) Travis Denney (Australia) Kate Wilson-Smith	10–15, 12–15	Bronze
1997	North Shore, New Zealand	(Australia) Stuart Brehaut	(Australia) Peter Blackburn (Australia) Rhonda Cator	9–15, 10–15	Bronze

=== IBF Grand Prix ===
The World Badminton Grand Prix sanctioned by International Badminton Federation (IBF) since 1983.

Women's doubles
Year	Tournament	Partner	Opponent	Score	Result
2005	Chinese Taipei Open	(Australia) Kate Wilson-Smith	(Chinese Taipei) Chien Yu-chin (Chinese Taipei) Cheng Wen-hsing	8–15, 14–17	(silver) Runner-up

=== IBF International ===
Women's singles
Year	Tournament	Opponent	Score	Result
2003	Fiji International	(Australia) Lenny Permana	3–11, 2–11	(silver) Runner-up
2003	New Caledonia International	(Australia) Lenny Permana	1–11, 5–11	(silver) Runner-up
2002	Western Australia International	(Australia) Lenny Permana	0–7, 0–7, 4–7	(silver) Runner-up
2002	North Harbour International	(Australia) Lenny Permana	3–7, 1–7, 6–8	(silver) Runner-up
1999	Fiji International	(Australia) Rayoni Head	5–11, 5–11	(silver) Runner-up
1999	Western Australia International	(Malaysia) Wong Miew Kheng	1–11, 8–11	(silver) Runner-up
1998	Australian International	(Australia) Michaela Smith	5–11, 3–11	(silver) Runner-up
1997	Western Australia International	(Australia) Rhonda Cator	1–11, 3–11	(silver) Runner-up

Women's doubles
Year	Tournament	Partner	Opponent	Score	Result
2006	Victoria International	(Australia) Kate Wilson-Smith	(New Zealand) Renee Flavell (New Zealand) Donna Haliday	25–27, 21–7, 22–24	(silver) Runner-up
2005	Australian International	(Australia) Kate Wilson-Smith	(New Zealand) Renee Flavell (New Zealand) Lianne Shirley	15–13, 15–5	(gold) Winner
2005	Waikato International	(Australia) Kate Wilson-Smith	(New Zealand) Rebecca Bellingham (New Zealand) Rachel Hindley	13–15, 15–5, 11–15	(silver) Runner-up
2005	Western Australia International	(Australia) Kate Wilson-Smith	(New Zealand) Nicole Gordon (New Zealand) Sara Runesten-Petersen	17–14, 15–9	(gold) Winner
2003	Fiji International	(Australia) Lenny Permana	(Fiji) Alissa Dean (Fiji) Karyn Whiteside	15–9, 15–6	(gold) Winner
1999	Fiji International	(Australia) Rayoni Head	(Australia) Rhonda Cator (Australia) Amanda Hardy	3–15, 2–15	(silver) Runner-up
1998	New South Wales International	(Australia) Rhonda Cator	(New Zealand) Sheree Jefferson (New Zealand) Li Feng	10–15, 10–15	(silver) Runner-up
1997	Western Australia International	(Australia) Rhonda Cator	(Australia) Bernie Clutterbuck (Australia) Tennille Denney	15–5, 15–4	(gold) Winner
1996	Australian International	(Australia) Rhonda Cator	(Philippines) Kennie Asuncion (Philippines) Amparo Lim	7–15, 8–15	(silver) Runner-up

Mixed doubles
Year	Tournament	Partner	Opponent	Score	Result
2004	Australian International	(Australia) Travis Denney	(Australia) Boyd Cooper (Australia) Kate Wilson-Smith	15–13, 15–13	(gold) Winner
2003	Fiji International	(Australia) Stuart Brehaut	(Fiji) Burty Molia (Fiji) Karyn Whiteside	8–15, 15–5, 15–5	(gold) Winner
2003	New Caledonia International	(Australia) Guy Gibson	(Australia) Stuart Brehaut (Australia) Tania Luiz	15–3, 8–15, 12–15	(silver) Runner-up
1997	Western Australia International	(Australia) David Bamford	(Australia) Peter Blackburn (Australia) Rhonda Cator	9–15, 11–15	(silver) Runner-up
