= Peter Blackburn (badminton) =

Australian badminton player (born 1968)

Personal information
- Born: Peter Grant Blackburn; 25 March 1968 (age 58) Ballarat, Victoria, Australia
- Height: 1.79 m (5 ft 10 in)
- Weight: 78 kg (172 lb)

Sport
- Country: Australia
- Sport: Badminton
- Event: Men's & mixed doubles

Men's & mixed doubles
- BWF profile
Medal record
Men's badminton
Representing Australia
Commonwealth Games
Bronze medal – third place	1994 Victoria	Men's doubles
Bronze medal – third place	1994 Victoria	Mixed doubles
Bronze medal – third place	1994 Victoria	Mixed team
Bronze medal – third place	1998 Kuala Lumpur	Mixed doubles
Oceania Championships
Gold medal – first place	1997 North Harbour	Men's doubles
Gold medal – first place	1999 Brisbane	Men's doubles
Gold medal – first place	1999 Brisbane	Mixed doubles
Gold medal – first place	2002 Suva	Men's doubles
Silver medal – second place	1997 North Harbour	Mixed doubles
Oceania Mixed Team Championships
Gold medal – first place	2002 Suva	Mixed team
Gold medal – first place	1999 Brisbane	Mixed team

Peter Grant Blackburn (born 25 March 1968) is an Australian badminton player who affiliated with the Ballarat Badminton Association. He competed at the 1996 and 2000 Summer Olympics, and collected four bronze medals at the Commonwealth Games. Blackburn graduated from the Ballarat University College with a Diploma in Teaching in 1991. He was awarded the Hollioake Medallion in 1991, 1994 and 1995 for his outstanding contribution to sport in the City of Ballarat, and in 1999 he was named Ballarat Sportsperson of the Year.

== Achievements ==
=== Commonwealth Games ===
Men's doubles
Year	Venue	Partner	Opponent	Score	Result
1994	McKinnon Gym, University of Victoria; Victoria, British Columbia, Canada	(Australia) Mark Nichols	(Malaysia) Cheah Soon Kit (Malaysia) Soo Beng Kiang	1–15, 2–15	Bronze

Mixed doubles
Year	Venue	Partner	Opponent	Score	Result
1994	McKinnon Gym, University of Victoria; Victoria, British Columbia, Canada	(Australia) Rhonda Cator	(England) Chris Hunt (England) Gillian Clark	7–15, 4–15	Bronze
1998	Kuala Lumpur Badminton Stadium; Kuala Lumpur, Malaysia	(Australia) Rhonda Cator	(England) Simon Archer (England) Joanne Goode	10–15, 4–15	Bronze

=== Oceania Championships ===
Men's doubles
Year	Venue	Partner	Opponent	Score	Result
1997	North Harbour Badminton Club; North Shore, New Zealand	(Australia) David Bamford	(New Zealand) Kerrin Harrison (New Zealand) Grant Walker	15–13, 17–14	Gold
1999	Sleeman Sports Complex; Brisbane, Australia	(Australia) David Bamford	(New Zealand) Dean Galt (New Zealand) Daniel Shirley	15–10, 15–11	Gold
2002	National Gymnasium; Suva, Fiji	(Australia) Murray Hocking	(Australia) Ashley Brehaut (Australia) Travis Denney	7–4, 7–8, 7–5	Gold

Mixed doubles
Year	Venue	Partner	Opponent	Score	Result
1997	North Harbour Badminton Club; North Shore, New Zealand	(Australia) Rhonda Cator	(New Zealand) Daniel Shirley (New Zealand) Tammy Jenkins	14–17, 13–15	Silver
1999	Sleeman Sports Complex; Brisbane, Australia	(Australia) Rhonda Cator	(Australia) David Bamford (Australia) Amanda Hardy	11–15, 15–3, 15–4	Gold

=== IBF World Grand Prix ===
The World Badminton Grand Prix has been sanctioned by the International Badminton Federation from 1983 to 2006.

Mixed doubles
Year	Tournament	Partner	Opponent	Score	Result
1995	Sydney Open	(Australia) Rhonda Cator	(Indonesia) Halim Haryanto (Indonesia) Indarti Issolina	14–17, 3–15	(silver) Runner-up

=== IBF International ===
Men's doubles
Year	Tournament	Partner	Opponent	Score	Result
1989	Australian International	(Australia) Gordon Lang	(Hong Kong) He Tim (Australia) D. Rughani	15–8, 15–13	(gold) Winner
1991	New Zealand International	(Australia) Darren McDonald	(New Zealand) Dean Galt (New Zealand) Kerrin Harrison	15–3, 15–8	(gold) Winner
1992	Australian International	(Australia) Mark Nichols	(Australia) Ong Beng Teong (Australia) Paul Stevenson	15–5, 15–4	(gold) Winner
1993	Australian International	(Australia) Mark Nichols	(Hong Kong) He Tim (Australia) Murray Hocking	15–4, 15–4	(gold) Winner
1994	Australian International	(Australia) Mark Nichols	(Australia) Paul Kong (Australia) Denis Todd	15–3, 15–1	(gold) Winner
1995	South Australia International	(Australia) Paul Staight	(Australia) Andrew Connolly (Australia) Murray Hocking	15–3, 15–9	(gold) Winner
1995	Victoria International	(Australia) Paul Staight	(Australia) Matthew McCarthy (Australia) Ben McCarthy	15–8, 15–8	(gold) Winner
1995	Auckland International	(Australia) Paul Staight	(New Zealand) Dean Galt (New Zealand) Glenn Stewart	15–10, 13–15, 15–6	(gold) Winner
1995	Australian International	(Australia) Paul Staight	(Hong Kong) Chan Siu Kwong (Hong Kong) He Tim	18–15, 9–15, 15–6	(gold) Winner
1997	Western Australia International	(Australia) David Bamford	(Australia) Gary Roberts (Australia) Michael Todd	15–11, 15–8	(gold) Winner
1997	Australian International	(Australia) David Bamford	(Australia) Murray Hocking (Australia) Mark Nichols	15–7, 16–18, 15–4	(gold) Winner
1998	Auckland International	(Australia) David Bamford	(New Zealand) Anton Gargiulo (New Zealand) Nick Hall	15–11, 15–6	(gold) Winner
1998	New South Wales International	(Australia) David Bamford	(Australia) Murray Hocking (Australia) Mark Nichols	8–15, 15–4, 15–3	(gold) Winner
1998	Australian International	(Australia) David Bamford	(Australia) Murray Hocking (Australia) Mark Nichols	15–12, 15–12	(gold) Winner
1999	Auckland International	(Australia) David Bamford	(New Zealand) Dean Galt (New Zealand) Daniel Shirley	9–15, 15–10, 15–11	(gold) Winner
1999	Waikato International	(Australia) David Bamford	(France) Manuel Dubrulle (France) Vincent Laigle	15–7, 15–7	(gold) Winner
1999	Wellington International	(Australia) David Bamford	(Hong Kong) Ma Che Kong (Hong Kong) Yau Tsz Yuk	8–15, 15–3, 15–6	(gold) Winner
1999	Western Australia International	(Australia) David Bamford	(Australia) Stuart Brehaut (Australia) Murray Hocking	17–15, 13–15, 15–11	(gold) Winner
1999	Fiji International	(Mauritius) Denis Constantin	(New Zealand) Geoffrey Bellingham (New Zealand) Daniel Shirley	15–13, 15–12	(gold) Winner
1999	Victoria International	(Australia) David Bamford	(Hong Kong) Ma Che Kong (Hong Kong) Yau Tsz Yuk	4–15, 6–15	(silver) Runner-up
2000	Australia Capital International	(Australia) David Bamford	(Hong Kong) Liu Kwok Wa (Hong Kong) Albertus Susanto Njoto	9–15, 3–15	(silver) Runner-up
2001	Hamilton International	(Australia) Murray Hocking	(New Zealand) Chris Blair (New Zealand) Daniel Shirley	5–7, 7–0, 1–7	(silver) Runner-up
2001	Canberra International	(Australia) Murray Hocking	(New Zealand) John Gordon (New Zealand) Daniel Shirley	6–8, 5–7, 3–7	(silver) Runner-up
2002	New Zealand International	(Australia) Murray Hocking	(New Zealand) John Gordon (New Zealand) Daniel Shirley	1–7, 4–7, 7–1	(silver) Runner-up

Mixed doubles
Year	Tournament	Partner	Opponent	Score	Result
1991	New Zealand International	(Australia) Lisa Campbell	(Australia) Darren McDonald (Australia) Anna Lao	15–8, 17–16	(gold) Winner
1991	Australian International	(Australia) Lisa Campbell	(Hong Kong) He Tim (Australia) Anna Lao	5–15, 4–15	(silver) Runner-up
1992	Australian International	(Australia) Lisa Campbell	(Australia) Ong Beng Teong (Australia) Wendy Shinners	6–15, 14–17	(silver) Runner-up
1993	Australian International	(Australia) Lisa Campbell	(Australia) Mark Nichols (Australia) Amanda Hardy	8–15, 5–15	(silver) Runner-up
1994	Australian International	(Australia) Rhonda Cator	(Australia) Mark Nichols (Australia) Amanda Hardy	14–17, 15–12, 7–15	(silver) Runner-up
1994	New Zealand International	(Australia) Rhonda Cator	(Germany) Michael Keck (Germany) Christine Skropke	15–8, 15–10	(gold) Winner
1995	Victor Cup	(Australia) Rhonda Cator	(Germany) Michael Keck (Germany) Katrin Schmidt	7–15, 6–15	(silver) Runner-up
1995	South Australia International	(Australia) Rhonda Cator	(Australia) Paul Stevenson (Australia) Amanda Hardy	Walkover	(silver) Runner-up
1995	Victoria International	(Australia) Rhonda Cator	(Australia) Paul Stevenson (Australia) Amanda Hardy	15–11, 15–9	(gold) Winner
1996	Australian International	(Australia) Rhonda Cator	(Hong Kong) Tam Kai Chuen (Hong Kong) Tung Chau Man	11–15, 17–14, 15–6	(gold) Winner
1997	Western Australia International	(Australia) Rhonda Cator	(Australia) David Bamford (Australia) Kellie Lucas	15–9, 15–11	(gold) Winner
1997	Australian International	(Australia) Rhonda Cator	(Australia) Murray Hocking (Australia) Lisa Campbell	15–7, 6–15, 11–15	(silver) Runner-up
1998	New South Wales International	(Australia) Rhonda Cator	(Australia) David Bamford (Australia) Lisa Bamford	15–4, 15–1	(gold) Winner
1998	South Australia International	(Australia) Rhonda Cator	(New Zealand) Dean Galt (New Zealand) Tammy Jenkins	15–4, 15–8	(gold) Winner
1998	Australian International	(Australia) Rhonda Cator	(Australia) Murray Hocking (Australia) Amanda Hardy	15–9, 11–15, 15–10	(gold) Winner
1999	Waikato International	(Australia) Rhonda Cator	(Australia) David Bamford (Australia) Amanda Hardy	15–12, 15–3	(gold) Winner
1999	Wellington International	(Australia) Rhonda Cator	(New Zealand) Daniel Shirley (New Zealand) Tammy Jenkins	12–15, 7–15	(silver) Runner-up
1999	Fiji International	(Australia) Rhonda Cator	(New Zealand) Daniel Shirley (New Zealand) Tammy Jenkins	10–15, 15–10, 15–2	(gold) Winner
1999	Victoria International	(Australia) Rhonda Cator	(New Zealand) Daniel Shirley (New Zealand) Tammy Jenkins	15–8, 10–15, 15–9	(gold) Winner
2000	Canadian International	(Australia) Rhonda Cator	(Canada) Mike Beres (Canada) Kara Solmundson	15–12, 12–15, 15–3	(gold) Winner
2000	New Zealand International	(Australia) Rhonda Cator	(New Zealand) Chris Blair (New Zealand) Sara Runesten-Petersen	15–8, 15–11	(gold) Winner
2000	Victoria International	(Australia) Rhonda Cator	(New Zealand) Chris Blair (New Zealand) Rebecca Gordon	8–15, 15–13, 15–2	(gold) Winner
