= 2006 Oceania Badminton Championships =

Tournament details
- Dates: 8 – 16 February
- Nations: 5
- Venue: North Harbour Badminton Centre
- Location: Auckland, New Zealand

Champions
- Men's singles: (New Zealand) Geoff Bellingham
- Women's singles: (New Zealand) Rachel Hindley
- Men's doubles: (New Zealand) Geoff Bellingham (New Zealand) Craig Cooper
- Women's doubles: (New Zealand) Nicole Gordon (New Zealand) Sara Runesten-Petersen
- Mixed doubles: (New Zealand) Daniel Shirley (New Zealand) Sara Runesten-Petersen

The 2006 Oceania Badminton Championships was the fifth edition of the Oceania Badminton Championships. The tournament was held from 8 to 16 February at the North Harbour Badminton Centre in Auckland, New Zealand. Five nations competed in the championships.

== Medal summary ==
=== Medalists ===
| Event | Gold | Silver | Bronze |
|---|---|---|---|
| Men's singles | (New Zealand) Geoff Bellingham | (New Zealand) John Moody | (Australia) Stuart Brehaut |
| Men's singles | (New Zealand) Geoff Bellingham | (New Zealand) John Moody | (Australia) Stuart Gomez |
| Women's singles | (New Zealand) Rachel Hindley | (New Zealand) Renee Flavell | (Australia) Tania Luiz |
| Women's singles | (New Zealand) Rachel Hindley | (New Zealand) Renee Flavell | (New Zealand) Michelle Chan |
| Men's doubles | (New Zealand) Geoffrey Bellingham (New Zealand) Craig Cooper | (New Zealand) John Gordon (New Zealand) Daniel Shirley | (Australia) Ross Smith (Australia) Glenn Warfe |
| Men's doubles | (New Zealand) Geoffrey Bellingham (New Zealand) Craig Cooper | (New Zealand) John Gordon (New Zealand) Daniel Shirley | (Australia) Ashley Brehaut (Australia) Travis Denney |
| Women's doubles | (New Zealand) Sara Runesten-Petersen (New Zealand) Nicole Gordon | (New Zealand) Rebecca Bellingham (New Zealand) Rachel Hindley | (Australia) Kellie Lucas (Australia) Kate Wilson-Smith |
| Women's doubles | (New Zealand) Sara Runesten-Petersen (New Zealand) Nicole Gordon | (New Zealand) Rebecca Bellingham (New Zealand) Rachel Hindley | (New Zealand) Renee Flavell (New Zealand) Donna Cranston |
| Mixed doubles | (New Zealand) Daniel Shirley (New Zealand) Sara Runesten-Petersen | (Australia) Travis Denney (Australia) Kate Wilson-Smith | (New Zealand) Craig Cooper (New Zealand) Renee Flavell |
| Mixed doubles | (New Zealand) Daniel Shirley (New Zealand) Sara Runesten-Petersen | (Australia) Travis Denney (Australia) Kate Wilson-Smith | (New Zealand) Henry Tam (New Zealand) Lianne Shirley |
| Mixed team | New Zealand | Australia | Fiji |

=== Medal table ===
* Host nation (New Zealand)

| Rank | Nation | Gold | Silver | Bronze | Total |
|---|---|---|---|---|---|
| 1 | New Zealand* | 6 | 4 | 4 | 14 |
| 2 | Australia | 0 | 2 | 6 | 8 |
| 3 | Fiji | 0 | 0 | 1 | 1 |
| Totals (3 entries) | | 6 | 6 | 11 | 23 |

== Individual results ==
=== Men's singles ===
Semi-finals
(New Zealand) Geoff Bellingham | 21 | 21
(Australia) Stuart Brehaut | 14 | 12
(Australia) Stuart Gomez | 4 | 13
(New Zealand) John Moody | 21 | 21

Final
(New Zealand) Geoff Bellingham | 13 | 21 | 21
(New Zealand) John Moody | 21 | 16 | 8

=== Women's singles ===
Semi-finals
(New Zealand) Michelle Chan | 18 | 21 | 16
(New Zealand) Renee Flavell | 21 | 11 | 21
(Australia) Tania Luiz | 17 | 10
(New Zealand) Rachel Hindley | 21 | 21

Final
(New Zealand) Renee Flavell | 22 | 11 | 15
(New Zealand) Rachel Hindley | 20 | 21 | 21

=== Men's doubles ===
Semi-finals
(New Zealand) John Gordon (New Zealand) Daniel Shirley | 21 | 21
(Australia) Ross Smith (Australia) Glenn Warfe | 15 | 16
(Australia) Ashley Brehaut (Australia) Travis Denney | 14 | 19
(New Zealand) Geoff Bellingham (New Zealand) Craig Cooper | 21 | 21

Final
(New Zealand) John Gordon (New Zealand) Daniel Shirley | 21 | 15^{r}
(New Zealand) Geoff Bellingham (New Zealand) Craig Cooper | 19 | 13

=== Women's doubles ===
Semi-finals
(Australia) Kellie Lucas (Australia) Kate Wilson-Smith | 19 | 15
(New Zealand) Rebecca Bellingham (New Zealand) Rachel Hindley | 21 | 21
(New Zealand) Donna Cranston (New Zealand) Renee Flavell | 17 | 14
(New Zealand) Nicole Gordon (New Zealand) Sara Runesten-Petersen | 21 | 21

Final
(New Zealand) Rebecca Bellingham (New Zealand) Rachel Hindley | 16 | 21
(New Zealand) Nicole Gordon (New Zealand) Sara Runesten-Petersen | 21 | 23

=== Mixed doubles ===
Semi-finals
(New Zealand) Daniel Shirley (New Zealand) Sara Runesten-Petersen | 21 | 21
(New Zealand) Henry Tam (New Zealand) Lianne Shirley | 10 | 8
(New Zealand) Craig Cooper (New Zealand) Renee Flavell | 14 | 24 | 17
(Australia) Travis Denney (Australia) Kate Wilson-Smith | 21 | 22 | 21

Final
(New Zealand) Daniel Shirley (New Zealand) Sara Runesten-Petersen | 21 | 22
(Australia) Travis Denney (Australia) Kate Wilson-Smith | 13 | 20

== Team event ==
=== Standings ===
| Pos | Team | Pld | Pts |
|---|---|---|---|
| 1 | Australia (H) | 4 | 4 |
| 2 | New Zealand | 4 | 3 |
| 3 | Fiji | 4 | 2 |
| 4 | New Caledonia | 4 | 1 |
| 5 | Samoa | 4 | 0 |

Source: The New Zealand Herald
(H) Host
