= Auckland International =

The Auckland International is a badminton open international championships held in Auckland, New Zealand. The tournament was classified as "International Series" by the Badminton World Federation (BWF) and provided an opportunity for players to compete for BWF points. The 2011 tournament held in Manukau, and classified as "Future Series".

== Previous winners ==
Year	Men's singles	Women's singles	Men's doubles	Women's doubles	Mixed doubles
1995	(New Zealand) Nick Hall	(New Zealand) Rhona Robertson	(Australia) Peter Blackburn (Australia) Paul Staight	(New Zealand) Rhona Robertson (New Zealand) Tammy Jenkins	(Australia) Paul Stevenson (Australia) Amanda Hardy
1997	(New Zealand) Geoffrey Bellingham	(New Zealand) Li Feng	(New Zealand) Geoffrey Bellingham (New Zealand) Jarrod King	(New Zealand) Rhona Robertson (New Zealand) Tammy Jenkins	(New Zealand) Croydon Rutherford (New Zealand) Lianne Shirley
1998	(Australia) Murray Hocking	(New Zealand) Rhona Robertson	(Australia) Peter Blackburn (Australia) David Bamford	(New Zealand) Rhona Robertson (New Zealand) Tammy Jenkins	(New Zealand) Dean Galt (New Zealand) Tammy Jenkins
1999	(Japan) Hidetaka Yamada	(New Zealand) Rhona Robertson	(Australia) Peter Blackburn (Australia) David Bamford	(Australia) Rhonda Cator (Australia) Amanda Hardy	(Australia) David Bamford (Australia) Amanda Hardy
2000	(New Zealand) Geoffrey Bellingham	(New Zealand) Rhona Robertson	(New Zealand) Geoffrey Bellingham (New Zealand) Chris Blair	(New Zealand) Rhona Robertson (New Zealand) Tammy Jenkins	(New Zealand) Daniel Shirley (New Zealand) Tammy Jenkins
2001	(New Zealand) Geoffrey Bellingham	(Indonesia) Lenny Permana	(Japan) Takanori Aoki (Japan) Tōru Matsumoto	(New Zealand) Rhona Robertson (New Zealand) Tammy Jenkins	(New Zealand) Daniel Shirley (Denmark) Sara Runesten-Petersen
2002	(New Zealand) John Gordon	(New Zealand) Nicole Gordon	(New Zealand) Daniel Shirley (New Zealand) John Gordon	(New Zealand) Rhona Robertson (China) Bei Wu	(New Zealand) Daniel Shirley (Denmark) Sara Runesten-Petersen
2003	(Japan) Shoji Sato	(Australia) Lenny Permana	(Australia) Ashley Brehaut (Australia) Travis Denney	(New Zealand) Nicole Gordon (New Zealand) Rebecca Gordon	(Australia) Travis Denney (Australia) Kate Wilson-Smith
2004	(Malaysia) Sairul Amar Ayob	(New Zealand) Rebecca Gordon	(New Zealand) Daniel Shirley (New Zealand) John Gordon	(New Zealand) Sara Runesten-Petersen (New Zealand) Rebecca Gordon	(New Zealand) Daniel Shirley (New Zealand) Sara Runesten-Petersen
2005	(New Zealand) Geoff Bellingham	(New Zealand) Rebecca Gordon	(New Zealand) Geoff Bellingham (New Zealand) Craig Cooper	(New Zealand) Nicole Gordon (New Zealand) Sara Runesten-Petersen	(New Zealand) Daniel Shirley (New Zealand) Sara Runesten-Petersen
2009	(Indonesia) Riyanto Subagja	(Indonesia) Febby Angguni	(Indonesia) Berry Angriawan (Indonesia) Muhammad Ulinnuha	(Indonesia) Jenna Gozali (Indonesia) Rufika Olivta	(Australia) Glenn Warfe (Australia) Renuga Veeran
2011	(Malaysia) Yogendran Krishnan	(United States) Karyn Velez	(New Zealand) Daniel Shirley (England) Andrew Smith	(New Zealand) Doriana Rivera Aliaga (New Zealand) Madeleine Stapleton	(New Zealand) Daniel Shirley (New Zealand) Gabby Aves
2012	(Chinese Taipei) Lai Chien-cheng	(Chinese Taipei) Chang Ya-lan	(New Zealand) Kevin Dennerly-Minturn (New Zealand) Oliver Leydon-Davis	(Indonesia) Keshya Nurvita Hanadia (Indonesia) Devi Tika Permatasari	(England) Tom Armstrong (England) Tracey Hallam
2013	(New Zealand) Joe Wu	(England) Tracey Hallam	(Australia) Robin Middleton (Australia) Ross Smith	(England) Tracey Hallam (Australia) Renuga Veeran	(Australia) Ross Smith (Australia) Renuga Veeran
2014	(Chinese Taipei) Lu Chia-hung	(Chinese Taipei) Lee Chia-hsin	(Chinese Taipei) Po Li-wei (Chinese Taipei) Yang Ming-tse	(Chinese Taipei) Chang Ching-hui (Chinese Taipei) Chang Hsin-tien	(Chinese Taipei) Lee Chia-han (Chinese Taipei) Lee Chia-hsin
2015	(Chinese Taipei) Lu Chia-hung	(Chinese Taipei) Lee Chia-hsin	(Malaysia) Darren Isaac Devadass (Malaysia) Vountus Indra Mawan	(Australia) Setyana Mapasa (Australia) Gronya Somerville	(Chinese Taipei) Lee Chia-han (Chinese Taipei) Lee Chia-hsin
