= 1997 Oceania Badminton Championships =

Tournament details
- Dates: 30 July – 2 August
- Nations: 5
- Venue: North Harbour Badminton Club
- Location: North Harbour, New Zealand

Champions
- Men's singles: (New Zealand) Nick Hall
- Women's singles: (New Zealand) Li Feng
- Men's doubles: (Australia) David Bamford (Australia) Peter Blackburn
- Women's doubles: (New Zealand) Li Feng (New Zealand) Sheree Jefferson
- Mixed doubles: (New Zealand) Daniel Shirley (New Zealand) Tammy Jenkins

The 1997 Oceania Badminton Championships was the inaugural edition of the Oceania Badminton Championships. The tournament was held from 30 July to 2 August at the North Harbour Badminton Club in North Harbour, Auckland, New Zealand. Five nations competed in the championships.

== Medal summary ==
=== Medalists ===
Event	Gold	Silver	Bronze
Men's singles	(New Zealand) Nick Hall	(New Zealand) Geoff Bellingham	(Australia) Stuart Brehaut
Men's singles	(New Zealand) Nick Hall	(New Zealand) Geoff Bellingham	(New Zealand) Jarrod King
Women's singles	(New Zealand) Li Feng	(New Zealand) Rhona Robertson	(New Zealand) Rebecca Gordon
Women's singles	(New Zealand) Li Feng	(New Zealand) Rhona Robertson	(Australia) Rhonda Cator
Men's doubles	(Australia) David Bamford (Australia) Peter Blackburn	(New Zealand) Grant Walker (New Zealand) Kerrin Harrison	(New Zealand) Igor Gantchitis (New Zealand) Ferdy Wiranata
Men's doubles	(Australia) David Bamford (Australia) Peter Blackburn	(New Zealand) Grant Walker (New Zealand) Kerrin Harrison	(New Zealand) Andrew Halliday (New Zealand) Daniel Shirley
Women's doubles	(New Zealand) Li Feng (New Zealand) Sheree Jefferson	(New Zealand) Tammy Jenkins (New Zealand) Rhona Robertson	(New Zealand) Megan Heaney (New Zealand) Aemalemaloitia Wilson
Women's doubles	(New Zealand) Li Feng (New Zealand) Sheree Jefferson	(New Zealand) Tammy Jenkins (New Zealand) Rhona Robertson	(Australia) Rhonda Cator (Australia) Kellie Lucas
Mixed doubles	(New Zealand) Daniel Shirley (New Zealand) Tammy Jenkins	(Australia) Peter Blackburn (Australia) Rhonda Cator	(Australia) Stuart Brehaut (Australia) Kellie Lucas
Mixed doubles	(New Zealand) Daniel Shirley (New Zealand) Tammy Jenkins	(Australia) Peter Blackburn (Australia) Rhonda Cator	(New Zealand) Grant Walker (New Zealand) Sheree Jefferson

=== Medal table ===
* Host nation (New Zealand)

Rank	Nation	Gold	Silver	Bronze	Total
1	New Zealand (NZL)*	4	4	6	14
2	Australia (AUS)	1	1	4	6
Totals (2 entries)		5	5	10	20

== Individual results ==
=== Men's singles ===
Semi-finals
(New Zealand) Nick Hall	17	15
(Australia) Stuart Brehaut	15	4
(New Zealand) Jarrod King	12	8
(New Zealand) Geoff Bellingham	15	15

Final
(New Zealand) Nick Hall	15	15
(New Zealand) Geoff Bellingham	2	8

=== Women's singles ===
Semi-finals
(New Zealand) Li Feng	11	11
(New Zealand) Rebecca Gordon	2	2
(Australia) Rhonda Cator	8	8
(New Zealand) Rhonda Robertson	11	11

Final
(New Zealand) Li Feng	5	11	11
(New Zealand) Rhonda Robertson	11	4	6

=== Men's doubles ===
Semi-finals
(Australia) David Bamford (Australia) Peter Blackburn	15	15
(New Zealand) Igor Gantchitis (New Zealand) Ferdy Wiranata	3	2
(New Zealand) Kerrin Harrison (New Zealand) Grant Walker	15	15
(New Zealand) Andrew Halliday (New Zealand) Daniel Shirley	3	11

Final
(Australia) David Bamford (Australia) Peter Blackburn	15	17
(New Zealand) Kerrin Harrison (New Zealand) Grant Walker	13	14

=== Women's doubles ===
Semi-finals
(New Zealand) Tammy Jenkins (New Zealand) Rhona Robertson	15	15
(New Zealand) Megan Heaney (New Zealand) Aemalemaloitia Wilson	3	8
(New Zealand) Li Feng (New Zealand) Sheree Jefferson	15	15
(Australia) Rhonda Cator (Australia) Kellie Lucas	2	4

Final
(New Zealand) Tammy Jenkins (New Zealand) Rhona Robertson	9	18	11
(New Zealand) Li Feng (New Zealand) Sheree Jefferson	15	13	15

=== Mixed doubles ===
Semi-finals
(Australia) Peter Blackburn (Australia) Rhonda Cator	15	15
(Australia) Stuart Brehaut (Australia) Kellie Lucas	9	10
(New Zealand) Daniel Shirley (New Zealand) Tammy Jenkins	15	18
(New Zealand) Grant Walker (New Zealand) Sheree Jefferson	7	15

Final
(Australia) Peter Blackburn (Australia) Rhonda Cator	14	13
(New Zealand) Daniel Shirley (New Zealand) Tammy Jenkins	17	15
