= Tania Luiz =

Australian badminton player

Personal information
- Born: Tania Ann Luiz; 28 August 1983 (age 43) Ernakulam, Kerala, India
- Height: 1.60 m (5 ft 3 in)
- Weight: 51 kg (112 lb)

Sport
- Country: Australia
- Sport: Badminton
- Handedness: Right
- Coached by: Ricky Yu (personal); Lasse Bundgaard (national)
- BWF profile
Medal record
Badminton
Representing Australia
Oceania Championships
Bronze medal – third place	2008 Nouméa	Women's doubles
Bronze medal – third place	2006 Auckland	Women's singles
Bronze medal – third place	2004 Waitakere City	Women's doubles
Bronze medal – third place	2004 Waitakere City	Mixed doubles
Oceania Mixed Team Championships
Silver medal – second place	2008 Nouméa	Mixed team
Silver medal – second place	2006 Auckland	Mixed team
Silver medal – second place	2004 Waitakere City	Mixed team
Oceania Women's Team Championships
Silver medal – second place	2008 Nouméa	Women's team
Silver medal – second place	2006 Auckland	Women's team

Tania Ann Luiz (born 28 August 1983) is an Australian badminton player. At the age of nine, Luiz moved with her family to Melbourne, Australia. She started playing badminton three years later, and went on to represent Australia at the 2006 Commonwealth Games, coincidentally in her home city. She defeated South Africa's Michelle Edwards and Fiji's Karyn Whiteside in the preliminary rounds, before losing out her third match to New Zealand's Rachel Hindley, with a score of 7–21 and 12–21.

Luiz qualified for the women's doubles at the 2008 Summer Olympics in Beijing, by placing fifteenth and receiving a continental spot for Oceania from the Badminton World Federation's ranking list. Luiz and her partner Eugenia Tanaka lost the preliminary round match to Japanese pair Miyuki Maeda and Satoko Suetsuna, with a score of 4–21 and 8–21.

Shortly after the Olympics, Luiz was selected as the member of the Badminton World Federation's Athletes Commission, along with five other athletes, including Guatemala's Pedro Yang.

== Achievements ==
=== Oceania Championships ===
Women's singles
Year	Venue	Opponent	Score	Result
2006	Auckland, New Zealand	(New Zealand) Rachel Hindley	17–21, 10–21	Bronze

Women's doubles
Year	Venue	Partner	Opponent	Score	Result
2008	Nouméa, New Caledonia	(Australia) Eugenia Tanaka	(New Zealand) Michelle Chan (New Zealand) Rachel Hindley	10–21, 10–21	Bronze
2004	Waitakere City, New Zealand	(Australia) Kellie Lucas	(New Zealand) Nicole Gordon (New Zealand) Sara Runesten-Petersen	6–15, 5–15	Bronze

Mixed doubles
Year	Venue	Partner	Opponent	Score	Result
2004	Waitakere City, New Zealand	(Australia) Stuart Brehaut	(New Zealand) Daniel Shirley (New Zealand) Sara Runesten-Petersen	1–15, 1–15	Bronze

=== BWF International Challenge/Series (4 titles, 7 runners-up) ===
Women's singles
Year	Tournament	Opponent	Score	Result
2005	New Caledonia International	(New Zealand) Renee Flavell	11–6, 1–11, 0–11	(silver) Runner-up

Women's doubles
Year	Tournament	Partner	Opponent	Score	Result
2008	Miami Pan Am International	(Australia) Eugenia Tanaka	(Peru) Cristina Aicardi (Peru) Claudia Rivero	21–13, 21–13	(gold) Winner
2008	Peru International	(Australia) Eugenia Tanaka	(Australia) Erin Carroll (Australia) Leisha Cooper	21–23, 21–17, 21–13	(gold) Winner
2007	Samoa International	(Australia) Susan Dobson	(New Zealand) Renee Flavell (New Zealand) Michelle Chan	21–17, 11–21, 21–16	(gold) Winner
2007	Fiji International	(Australia) Susan Dobson	(New Zealand) Renee Flavell (New Zealand) Michelle Chan	15–21, 15–21	(silver) Runner-up
2004	Ballarat International	(Australia) Kate Wilson-Smith	(Australia) Renuga Veeran (Australia) Susan Wang	7–15, 12–15	(silver) Runner-up

Mixed doubles
Year	Tournament	Partner	Opponent	Score	Result
2005	New Caledonia International	(Australia) Glenn Warfe	(New Zealand) Scott Menzies (New Zealand) Renee Flavell	6–15, 10–15	(silver) Runner-up
2005	Australian International	(Australia) Stuart Brehaut	(Australia) Travis Denney (Australia) Kate Wilson-Smith	9–15, 8–15	(silver) Runner-up
2004	Ballarat International	(Australia) Stuart Brehaut	(Australia) Travis Denney (Australia) Kate Wilson-Smith	3–15, 2–15	(silver) Runner-up
2004	Western Australia International	(Australia) Stuart Brehaut	(Australia) Travis Denney (Australia) Kate Wilson-Smith	1–15, 1–15	(silver) Runner-up
2003	New Caledonia International	(Australia) Stuart Brehaut	(Australia) Guy Gibson (Australia) Kellie Lucas	3–15, 15–8, 15–12	(gold) Winner

BWF International Challenge tournament
BWF International Series tournament
BWF Future Series tournament
