= Kerrin Harrison =

New Zealand badminton player (born 1964)

Personal information
- Born: Kerrin Charters Harrison; 27 April 1964 (age 62) Manawatū-Whanganui, New Zealand
- Height: 1.78 m (5 ft 10 in)
- Weight: 74 kg (163 lb; 11.7 st)

Sport
- Country: New Zealand
- Sport: Badminton
- Handedness: Right
- Event: Men's singles

Men's singles
- BWF profile
Medal record
Men's badminton
Representing New Zealand
Commonwealth Games
Bronze medal – third place	1986 Edinburgh	Men's doubles
Oceania Championships
Silver medal – second place	1997 North Harbour	Men's doubles

Kerrin Charters Harrison (born 27 April 1964) is a New Zealand badminton player.

Along with Glenn Stewart, he won a bronze medal in the badminton men's doubles at the 1986 Commonwealth Games in Edinburgh, Scotland.

He attended Westlake Boys High School on the North Shore, Auckland from 1979 to 1982. Kerrin won the men's French Badminton singles open in 1986. And along with Glenn Stewart also won the men's French Badminton doubles open in 1986. Along with Phillip Horne, Kerrin Harrison represented New Zealand in Badminton men's doubles, at the 1990 Commonwealth Games in Auckland, New Zealand.

At the age of 28 Kerrin represented New Zealand at the 1992 Summer Olympics in Barcelona in both the men's singles and doubles for Badminton He was a New Zealand representative for ten years. He won the men's masters (over 45s) Badminton singles in New Zealand, 17–20 September 2009.

== Achievements ==
=== Commonwealth Games ===
Men's doubles
Year	Venue	Partner	Opponent	Score	Result
1986	Meadowbank Sports Centre; Edinburgh, Scotland	(New Zealand) Glenn Stewart	(Australia) Paul Kong (Australia) Michael Scandolera	15–12, 15–11	Bronze

=== Oceania Championships ===
Men's doubles
Year	Venue	Partner	Opponent	Score	Result
1999	Sleeman Sports Complex; Brisbane, Australia	(New Zealand) Grant Walker	(Australia) David Bamford (Australia) Peter Blackburn	13–15, 14–17	Silver

=== IBF International ===
Men's singles
Year	Tournament	Opponent	Score	Result
1986	French Open	(New Zealand) Graeme Robson		(gold) Winner
1987	New Zealand International	(New Zealand) Glenn Stewart	15–11, 15–5	(gold) Winner
1987	Australian Open	(Australia) Michael Scandolera	1–15, 15–5, 15–6	(gold) Winner
1988	New Zealand International	(New Zealand) Philip Horne	15–10, 12–15, 6–15	(silver) Runner-up
1989	New Zealand International	(New Zealand) Glenn Stewart	10–15, 15–13, 15–11	(gold) Winner

Men's doubles
Year	Tournament	Partner	Opponent	Score	Result
1986	French Open	(New Zealand) Glenn Stewart	(France) Christophe Jeanjean (France) Benoît Pitte		(gold) Winner
1987	New Zealand International	(New Zealand) Glenn Stewart	(New Zealand) Graeme Robson (New Zealand) Steve Wilson	15–12, 15–7	(gold) Winner
1987	Australian Open	(New Zealand) Glenn Stewart	(Australia) Peter Roberts (Australia) Michael Scandolera	18–14, 15–11	(gold) Winner
1988	New Zealand International	(New Zealand) Glenn Stewart	(New Zealand) Kevin Ross (New Zealand) Ryan Whittle	15–3, 15–8	(gold) Winner
1989	New Zealand International	(New Zealand) Glenn Stewart	(New Zealand) Stephen Lobb (New Zealand) Jacob van Selm	15–5, 15–4	(gold) Winner
1990	New Zealand International	(New Zealand) Glenn Stewart	(New Zealand) Dean Galt (New Zealand) Nicholas Hall	Walkover	(silver) Runner-up
1991	New Zealand International	(New Zealand) Dean Galt	(Australia) Peter Blackburn (New Zealand) Darren McDonald	3–15, 8–15	(silver) Runner-up
1993	New Zealand International	(New Zealand) Dean Galt	(New Zealand) Nicholas Hall (New Zealand) Grant Walker	15–11, 15–7	(gold) Winner

Mixed doubles
Year	Tournament	Partner	Opponent	Score	Result
1987	New Zealand International	(New Zealand) Katrin Lockey	(New Zealand) Graeme Robson (New Zealand) Toni Whittaker	9–15, 15–17	(silver) Runner-up
1988	New Zealand International	(New Zealand) Katrin Lockey	(New Zealand) Graeme Robson (New Zealand) Toni Whittaker	12–15, 4–15	(silver) Runner-up
1989	New Zealand International	(New Zealand) Lynne Horne	(New Zealand) Graeme Robson (New Zealand) Toni Whittaker	8–15, 12–15	(silver) Runner-up
1993	New Zealand International	(New Zealand) Tammy Jenkins	(New Zealand) Dean Galt (New Zealand) Liao Yuejin	5–15, 5–15	(silver) Runner-up
