= Dean Galt =

New Zealand badminton player

Personal information
- Born: 13 February 1971 (age 55) Invercargill, New Zealand
- Years active: 1989–2000
- Height: 1.84 m (6 ft 0 in)

Sport
- Country: New Zealand
- Sport: Badminton
- Handedness: Right
- BWF profile
Medal record
Men's badminton
Representing New Zealand
Commonwealth Games
Bronze medal – third place	1998 Kuala Lumpur	Men's team
Oceania Championships
Silver medal – second place	1999 Brisbane	Men's doubles
Bronze medal – third place	1999 Brisbane	Mixed doubles
Oceania Mixed Team Championships
Silver medal – second place	1999 Brisbane	Mixed team

Dean Galt (born 13 February 1971) is a retired male badminton player from New Zealand.

== Career ==
Galt competed in badminton at the 1992 Summer Olympics in men's singles. He lost in the first round to Chris Jogis, of the United States, 15–1, 15–3.

He represented New Zealand in the 1994 Commonwealth Games, and the 1998 Commonwealth Games where he was one of the men's team that won a bronze.

== Achievements ==
=== Oceania Championships ===
Men's doubles
Year	Venue	Partner	Opponent	Score	Result
1999	Sleeman Sports Complex; Brisbane, Australia	(New Zealand) Daniel Shirley	(Australia) David Bamford (Australia) Peter Blackburn	10–15, 11–15	Silver

Mixed doubles
Year	Venue	Partner	Opponent	Score	Result
1999	Sleeman Sports Complex; Brisbane, Australia	(New Zealand) Daniel Shirley	(Australia) David Bamford (Australia) Amanda Hardy	10–15, 15–6, 8–15	Bronze

=== IBF International ===
Men's singles
Year	Tournament	Opponent	Score	Result
1990	New Zealand International	(New Zealand) Nicholas Hall	11–15, 15–10, 12–15	(silver) Runner-up
1992	New Zealand International	(New Zealand) Nicholas Hall	15–4, 8–15, 15–9	(gold) Winner
1993	New Zealand International	(New Zealand) Nicholas Hall	15–6, 15–2	(gold) Winner
1997	New Zealand International	(New Zealand) Nicholas Hall	6–15, 3–15	(silver) Runner-up

Men's doubles
Year	Tournament	Partner	Opponent	Score	Result
1990	New Zealand International	(New Zealand) Nicholas Hall	(New Zealand) Kerrin Harrison (New Zealand) Glenn Stewart	Walkover	(gold) Winner
1991	New Zealand International	(New Zealand) Kerrin Harrison	(Australia) Peter Blackburn (Australia) Darren McDonald	3–15, 8–15	(silver) Runner-up
1992	New Zealand International	(New Zealand) Andrew Compton	(New Zealand) Nicholas Hall (New Zealand) Grant Walker	15–8, 15–8	(gold) Winner
1993	New Zealand International	(New Zealand) Kerrin Harrison	(New Zealand) Nicholas Hall (New Zealand) Grant Walker	15–11, 15–7	(gold) Winner
1995	Auckland International	(New Zealand) Glenn Stewart	(Australia) Peter Blackburn (Australia) Paul Staight	10–15, 15–13, 6–15	(silver) Runner-up
1995	New Zealand International	(New Zealand) Grant Walker	(Hong Kong) Chan Siu Kwong (Hong Kong) Tim He	15–12, 8–15, 9–15	(silver) Runner-up
1998	Waikato International	(New Zealand) Daniel Shirley	(Australia) David Bamford (Australia) Peter Blackburn	15–10, 15–17, 9–15	(silver) Runner-up
1998	New Zealand International	(New Zealand) Daniel Shirley	(New Zealand) Anton Gargiulo (New Zealand) Nicholas Hall	17–14, 15–1	(gold) Winner
1999	Auckland International	(New Zealand) Daniel Shirley	(Australia) David Bamford (Australia) Peter Blackburn	15–9, 10–15, 11–15	(silver) Runner-up

Mixed doubles
Year	Tournament	Partner	Opponent	Score	Result
1992	New Zealand International	(New Zealand) Tammy Jenkins	(New Zealand) Grant Walker (New Zealand) Sheree Jefferson	18–13, 12–15, 13–15	(silver) Runner-up
1993	New Zealand International	(New Zealand) Liao Yuejin	(New Zealand) Kerrin Harrison (New Zealand) Tammy Jenkins	15–5, 15–5	(gold) Winner
1996	New Zealand International	(New Zealand) Tammy Jenkins	(Hong Kong) Tam Kai Chuen (Hong Kong) Tung Chau Man	14–18, 11–15	(silver) Runner-up
1998	Auckland International	(New Zealand) Tammy Jenkins	(New Zealand) Sheree Jefferson (New Zealand) Daniel Shirley	15–13, 13–15, 15–10	(gold) Winner
1998	South Australia International	(New Zealand) Tammy Jenkins	(Australia) Peter Blackburn (Australia) Rhonda Cator	4–15, 8–15	(silver) Runner-up
1998	New Zealand International	(New Zealand) Tammy Jenkins	(New Zealand) Grant Walker (Denmark) Sara Runesten-Petersen	15–1, 8–15, 15–1	(gold) Winner
