= Donna Haliday =

New Zealand badminton player (born 1981)

Personal information
- Born: 4 February 1981 (age 45) Raetihi, New Zealand
- Height: 1.73 m (5 ft 8 in)

Sport
- Country: New Zealand
- Sport: Badminton
- Handedness: Right

Women's & mixed doubles
- Highest ranking: 30 (WD 15 July 2010); 25 (XD 15 July 2010)
Medal record
Women's badminton
Representing New Zealand
Oceania Championships
Gold medal – first place	2008 Nouméa	Mixed doubles
Silver medal – second place	2008 Nouméa	Women's doubles
Silver medal – second place	2010 Invercargill	Mixed doubles
Bronze medal – third place	2004 Waitakere City	Women's doubles
Bronze medal – third place	2006 Auckland	Women's doubles
Bronze medal – third place	2010 Invercargill	Women's doubles
Oceania Mixed Team Championships
Gold medal – first place	2004 Waitakere City	Mixed team
Gold medal – first place	2006 Auckland	Mixed team
Gold medal – first place	2008 Nouméa	Mixed team
Silver medal – second place	2010 Invercargill	Mixed team
Oceania Women's Team Championships
Gold medal – first place	2008 Nouméa	Women's team
Silver medal – second place	2010 Invercargill	Women's team

Donna Haliday (born 4 February 1981; née Cranston) is a New Zealand badminton player.

== Career ==
In 2008, she won the mixed doubles title at the Oceania Championships in New Caledonia with Henry Tam. She also completed her success by winning the women's and mixed team gold, and making the women's team competed at the 2008 Uber Cup finals in Jakarta. In 2010, she competed at the Delhi Commonwealth Games.

== Personal life ==
Haliday was born in Raetihi, and raised in Ohakune. Her husband is former national badminton rep Andrew Haliday

== Achievements ==
=== Oceania Championships ===
Women's doubles
Year	Venue	Partner	Opponent	Score	Result
2004	Waitakere Badminton Centre; Waitakere City, New Zealand	(New Zealand) Kimberly Windsor	(Australia) Jane Crabtree (Australia) Kate Wilson-Smith	8–15, 7–15	Bronze
2006	North Harbour Badminton Centre; Auckland, New Zealand	(New Zealand) Renee Flavell	(New Zealand) Nicole Gordon (New Zealand) Sara Runesten-Petersen	17–21, 14–21	Bronze
2008	Salle Veyret; Nouméa, New Caledonia	(New Zealand) Renee Flavell	(New Zealand) Michelle Chan (New Zealand) Rachel Hindley	14–21, 8–21	Silver
2010	Stadium Southland; Invercargill	(New Zealand) Danielle Barry	(Australia) Leanne Choo (Australia) Kate Wilson-Smith	13–21, 12–21	Bronze

Mixed doubles
Year	Venue	Partner	Opponent	Score	Result
2008	Salle Veyret; Nouméa, New Caledonia	(New Zealand) Henry Tam	(New Zealand) Craig Cooper (New Zealand) Renee Flavell	16–21, 21–19, 21–17	Gold
2010	Stadium Southland; Invercargill, New Zealand	(New Zealand) Henry Tam	(Australia) Glenn Warfe (Australia) Kate Wilson-Smith	11–21, 10–21	Silver

=== BWF Grand Prix ===
The BWF Grand Prix had two levels, the BWF Grand Prix and Grand Prix Gold. It was a series of badminton tournaments sanctioned by the Badminton World Federation (BWF) which was held from 2007 to 2017.

Mixed doubles
Year	Tournament	Partner	Opponent	Score	Result
2009	Australian Open	(New Zealand) Henry Tam	(Hong Kong) Yohan Hadikusumo Wiratama (Hong Kong) Chau Hoi Wah	11–21, 5–21	(silver) Runner-up

BWF Grand Prix Gold tournament
BWF Grand Prix tournament

=== BWF International Challenge/Series ===
Women's doubles
Year	Tournament	Partner	Opponent	Score	Result
2006	Victoria International	(New Zealand) Renee Flavell	(Australia) Kellie Lucas (Australia) Kate Wilson-Smith	27–25, 7–21, 24–22	(gold) Winner
2007	Victoria International	(New Zealand) Renee Flavell	(Malaysia) Haw Chiou Hwee (Malaysia) Lim Pek Siah	8–21, 14–21	(silver) Runner-up
2009	Victoria International	(New Zealand) Danielle Barry	(Australia) Erin Carroll (Australia) Renuga Veeran	21–16, 19–21, 20–22	(silver) Runner-up
2009	Nouméa International	(New Zealand) Danielle Barry	(Mexico) Deyanira Angulo (Australia) Louise McKenzie	21–5, 21–11	(gold) Winner
2009	Cyprus International	(New Zealand) Danielle Barry	(Russia) Anastasia Chervyakova (Russia) Natalia Perminova	18–21, 20–22	(silver) Runner-up

Mixed doubles
Year	Tournament	Partner	Opponent	Score	Result
2008	Waikato International	(New Zealand) Henry Tam	(Japan) Naomasa Senkyo (Japan) Misaki Matsutomo	21–13, 21–18	(gold) Winner
2008	North Shore City International	(New Zealand) Henry Tam	(New Zealand) Joe Wu (New Zealand) Danielle Barry	21–14, 21–12	(gold) Winner
2009	Victoria International	(New Zealand) Henry Tam	(Australia) Raj Veeran (Australia) Renuga Veeran	12–21, 15–21	(silver) Runner-up
2009	Nouméa International	(New Zealand) Henry Tam	(New Zealand) Kevin Dennerly-Minturn (Australia) Louise McKenzie	21–19, 21–15	(gold) Winner
2009	Cyprus International	(New Zealand) Henry Tam	(Wales) Richard Vaughan (Wales) Sarah Thomas	21–18, 21–14	(gold) Winner
2010	Canterbury International	(New Zealand) Joe Wu	(New Zealand) Oliver Leydon-Davis (New Zealand) Louise McKenzie	21–19, 19–21, 23–25	(silver) Runner-up

BWF International Challenge tournament
BWF International Series tournament
BWF Future Series tournament
