= Craig Cooper (badminton) =

New Zealand badminton player (born 1981)

Personal information
- Born: Craig Richard Cooper; 28 February 1981 (age 45) Wellington, New Zealand
- Height: 1.95 m (6 ft 5 in)
- Weight: 93 kg (205 lb)

Sport
- Country: New Zealand
- Sport: Badminton
- Handedness: Left
- Event: Men's singles & doubles

Men's singles & doubles
- BWF profile
Medal record
Men's badminton
Representing New Zealand
Oceania Championships
Gold medal – first place	2006 Auckland	Men's doubles
Silver medal – second place	2008 Nouméa	Mixed doubles
Silver medal – second place	2004 Waitakere City	Men's doubles
Bronze medal – third place	2006 Auckland	Mixed doubles
Bronze medal – third place	2002 Suva	Mixed doubles
Oceania Mixed Team Championships
Gold medal – first place	2008 Nouméa	Mixed team
Gold medal – first place	2006 Auckland	Mixed team
Gold medal – first place	2004 Waitakere City	Mixed team
Silver medal – second place	2002 Suva	Mixed team
Oceania Women's Team Championships
Gold medal – first place	2008 Nouméa	Men's team
Gold medal – first place	2006 Auckland	Men's team
Gold medal – first place	2004 Ballarat	Men's team

Craig Richard Cooper (born 28 February 1981) is a New Zealand badminton player who competed in the 2006 Commonwealth Games and the 2008 Summer Olympics.

== Achievements ==
=== Oceania Championships ===
Men's doubles
Year	Venue	Partner	Opponent	Score	Result
2006	Auckland, New Zealand	(New Zealand) Geoffrey Bellingham	(Australia) John Gordon (New Zealand) Daniel Shirley	19–21, 13–15 Retired	Gold
2004	Waitakere City, New Zealand	(New Zealand) Geoffrey Bellingham	(Australia) John Gordon (New Zealand) Daniel Shirley	11–15, 15–17	Silver

Mixed doubles
Year	Venue	Partner	Opponent	Score	Result
2008	Nouméa, New Caledonia	(New Zealand) Renee Flavell	(New Zealand) Henry Tam (New Zealand) Donna Cranston	21–16, 19–21, 17–21	Silver
2006	Auckland, New Zealand	(New Zealand) Renee Flavell	(Australia) Travis Denney (Australia) Kate Wilson-Smith	14–21, 24–22, 17–21	Bronze
2002	Suva, Fiji	(New Zealand) Tammy Jenkins	(New Zealand) Daniel Shirley (New Zealand) Sara Runesten-Petersen	3–7, 2–7, 7–5	Bronze

=== BWF International Challenge/Series ===
Men's doubles
Year	Tournament	Partner	Opponent	Score	Result
2008	Waikato International	(New Zealand) Joe Wu	(Japan) Rei Sato (Japan) Naomasa Senkyo	16–21, 15–21	(silver) Runner-up
2007	Fiji International	(New Zealand) Blair Rutherford	(Fiji) Ryan Fong (Fiji) Burty Molia	21–17, 19–21, 11–21	(silver) Runner-up
2006	North Harbour International	(New Zealand) Daniel Shirley	(New Zealand) Henry Tam (New Zealand) Joe Wu	21–11, 22–20	(gold) Winner
2005	Western Australia International	(New Zealand) Geoffrey Bellingham	(New Zealand) John Gordon (New Zealand) Daniel Shirley	7–15, 10–15	(silver) Runner-up
2005	North Harbour International	(New Zealand) Geoffrey Bellingham	(Australia) Boyd Cooper (Australia) Travis Denney	15–11, 15–6	(gold) Winner
2005	Waikato International	(New Zealand) Geoffrey Bellingham	(New Zealand) John Gordon (New Zealand) Daniel Shirley	15–13, 15–8	(gold) Winner
2005	Australian International	(New Zealand) Geoffrey Bellingham	(Australia) Boyd Cooper (Australia) Travis Denney	11–15, 17–14, 12–15	(silver) Runner-up
2004	Auckland International	(New Zealand) Geoffrey Bellingham	(New Zealand) John Gordon (New Zealand) Daniel Shirley	1–15, 15–11, 13–15	(silver) Runner-up
2002	Auckland International	(New Zealand) Chris Blair	(New Zealand) John Gordon (New Zealand) Daniel Shirley	10–15, 15–6, 5–15	(silver) Runner-up

Mixed doubles
Year	Tournament	Partner	Opponent	Score	Result
2007	Victorian International	(New Zealand) Renee Flavell	(Australia) Murray Hocking (Australia) Kate Wilson-Smith	22–20, 21–17	(gold) Winner
2007	Australian International	(New Zealand) Renee Flavell	(Australia) Aji Basuki Sindoro (Australia) Peggy Lim	21–17, 26–24	(gold) Winner
2007	Fiji International	(New Zealand) Renee Flavell	(Australia) Ben Walklate (Australia) Erin Carroll	17–21, 21–14, 21–12	(gold) Winner
2007	Samoa International	(New Zealand) Renee Flavell	(Australia) Ben Walklate (Australia) Erin Carroll	21–4, 21–12	(gold) Winner
2006	Australian International	(New Zealand) Renee Flavell	(New Zealand) Daniel Shirley (Malaysia) Joanne Quay	10–21, 19–21	(silver) Runner-up
2006	Waikato International	(New Zealand) Renee Flavell	(Spain) José Antonio Crespo (Peru) Doriana Rivera	21–17, 21–18	(gold) Winner
2005	North Harbour International	(New Zealand) Lianne Shirley	(New Zealand) Daniel Shirley (New Zealand) Sara Runesten-Petersen	2–15, 3–15	(silver) Runner-up
2005	Waikato International	(New Zealand) Lianne Shirley	(New Zealand) Daniel Shirley (New Zealand) Sara Runesten-Petersen	4–15, 17–14, 7–15	(silver) Runner-up
2004	Canterbury International	(New Zealand) Lianne Shirley	(Japan) Hiroshi Shimizu (Japan) Miyuki Tai	11–15, 15–10, 15–4	(gold) Winner
2004	New Zealand International	(New Zealand) Lianne Shirley	(Australia) Boyd Cooper (Australia) Susan Dobson	15–7, 15–7	(gold) Winner
2001	Canberra International	(New Zealand) Tammy Jenkins	(New Zealand) Daniel Shirley (New Zealand) Renee Flavell	5–7, 7–5, 1–7	(silver) Runner-up

BWF International Challenge tournament
BWF International Series tournament
BWF Future Series tournament
