= John Gordon (badminton) =

New Zealand badminton player (born 1978)

Personal information
- Born: 25 November 1978 (age 47) Wellington, New Zealand
- Height: 1.85 m (6 ft 1 in)

Sport
- Country: New Zealand
- Sport: Badminton
- Handedness: Right
- Event: Men's singles & doubles

Men's singles & doubles
- BWF profile
Medal record
Men's badminton
Representing New Zealand
Commonwealth Games
Bronze medal – third place	2002 Manchester	Mixed team
Oceania Championships
Gold medal – first place	2004 Waitakere City	Men's doubles
Silver medal – second place	2006 Auckland	Men's doubles
Bronze medal – third place	2002 Suva	Men's doubles
Oceania Mixed Team Championships
Gold medal – first place	2006 Auckland	Mixed team
Gold medal – first place	2004 Waitakere City	Mixed team
Silver medal – second place	2002 Suva	Mixed team
Silver medal – second place	1999 Brisbane	Mixed team
Oceania Men's Team Championships
Gold medal – first place	2006 Auckland	Men's team
Gold medal – first place	2004 Ballarat	Men's team

John Gordon (born 25 November 1978) is a New Zealand badminton player. He competed at the 2002 Commonwealth Games, and won a bronze medal in the mixed team event.

== Achievements ==
=== Oceania Championships ===
Men's doubles
Year	Venue	Partner	Opponent	Score	Result
2006	Auckland, New Zealand	(New Zealand) Daniel Shirley	(New Zealand) Geoffrey Bellingham (New Zealand) Craig Cooper	21–19, 15–13 Retired	Silver
2004	Waitakere City, New Zealand	(New Zealand) Daniel Shirley	(New Zealand) Geoffrey Bellingham (New Zealand) Craig Cooper	15–11, 17–15	Gold
2002	Suva, Fiji	(New Zealand) Daniel Shirley	(Australia) Peter Blackburn (Australia) Murray Hocking	7–4, 5–7, 6–8	Bronze

=== BWF International Challenge/Series ===
Men's singles
Year	Tournament	Opponent	Score	Result
2005	Western Australia International	(New Zealand) Geoffrey Bellingham	6–15, 9–15	(silver) Runner-up
2002	Auckland International	(Canada) Sam Smith	15–8, 15–13	(gold) Winner

Men's doubles
Year	Tournament	Partner	Opponent	Score	Result
2008	North Shore City International	(New Zealand) John Moody	(Japan) Rei Sato (Japan) Naomasa Senkyo	11–21, 21–15, 13–21	(silver) Runner-up
2007	Australian International	(New Zealand) Daniel Shirley	(Australia) Aji Basuki Sindoro (Australia) Ashley Brehaut	19–21, 19–21	(silver) Runner-up
2006	Australian International	(New Zealand) Daniel Shirley	(Indonesia) Aji Basuki Sindoro (Australia) Ashley Brehaut	21–19, 13–21, 21–18	(gold) Winner
2005	New Zealand International	(New Zealand) Daniel Shirley	(Australia) Boyd Cooper (Australia) Travis Denney	11–15, 9–15	(silver) Runner-up
2005	Waikato International	(New Zealand) Daniel Shirley	(New Zealand) Geoffrey Bellingham (New Zealand) Craig Cooper	13–15, 8–15	(silver) Runner-up
2005	Western Australia International	(New Zealand) Daniel Shirley	(New Zealand) Geoffrey Bellingham (New Zealand) Craig Cooper	15–7, 15–10	(gold) Winner
2004	Auckland International	(New Zealand) Daniel Shirley	(New Zealand) Geoffrey Bellingham (New Zealand) Craig Cooper	15–1, 11–15, 15–13	(gold) Winner
2003	Wellington International	(New Zealand) Daniel Shirley	(Japan) Yuichi Ikeda (Japan) Shoji Sato	15–5, 16–17, 15–10	(gold) Winner
2003	Ballarat International	(New Zealand) Daniel Shirley	(Australia) Ashley Brehaut (Australia) Travis Denney	15–7, 15–8	(gold) Winner
2002	Auckland International	(New Zealand) Daniel Shirley	(New Zealand) Chris Blair (New Zealand) Craig Cooper	15–10, 6–15, 15–5	(gold) Winner
2002	Western Australia International	(New Zealand) Daniel Shirley	(Japan) Shuichi Nakao (Japan) Shuichi Sakamoto	7–4, 7–4, 7–4	(gold) Winner
2002	New Zealand International	(New Zealand) Daniel Shirley	(Australia) Peter Blackburn (Australia) Murray Hocking	7–1, 7–4, 1–7	(gold) Winner
2002	North Harbour International	(New Zealand) Daniel Shirley	(Australia) Ashley Brehaut (Australia) Travis Denney	7–1, 7–2, 3–7	(gold) Winner
2002	Altona International	(New Zealand) Daniel Shirley	(Australia) Stuart Brehaut (Australia) Travis Denney	7–2, 7–2, 7–2	(gold) Winner
2002	Dutch International	(New Zealand) Daniel Shirley	(England) Peter Jeffrey (England) Ian Palethorpe	7–3, 7–4, 7–5	(gold) Winner
2001	Canberra International	(New Zealand) Daniel Shirley	(Australia) Peter Blackburn (Australia) Murray Hocking	8–6, 7–5, 7–3	(gold) Winner
2000	New Zealand International	(New Zealand) Daniel Shirley	(Scotland) Robert Blair (Scotland) Russell Hogg	17–16, 15–7	(gold) Winner
2000	Auckland International	(New Zealand) Daniel Shirley	(New Zealand) Geoffrey Bellingham (New Zealand) Chris Blair	11–15, 15–6, 12–15	(silver) Runner-up

BWF International Challenge tournament
BWF International Series tournament
