= Rachel Hindley =

New Zealand badminton player (born 1981)

Personal information
- Born: Rachel Louise Hindley; 30 December 1981 (age 44)
- Height: 1.80 m (5 ft 11 in)

Sport
- Country: New Zealand
- Sport: Badminton
- Handedness: Right

Women's singles & doubles
- Highest ranking: 172 (WS) 22 October 2009; 92 (WD) 22 Oct 2009
- BWF profile
Medal record
Badminton
Representing New Zealand
Oceania Championships
| Gold medal – first place | 2008 Nouméa | Women's doubles |
| Gold medal – first place | 2006 Auckland | Women's singles |
| Silver medal – second place | 2008 Nouméa | Women's singles |
| Silver medal – second place | 2006 Auckland | Women's doubles |
| Bronze medal – third place | 2004 Waitakere City | Women's singles |
Oceania Mixed Team Championships
| Gold medal – first place | 2008 Nouméa | Mixed team |
| Gold medal – first place | 2006 Auckland | Mixed team |
| Gold medal – first place | 2004 Waitakere City | Mixed team |
Oceania Women's Team Championships
| Gold medal – first place | 2008 Nouméa | Women's team |

Rachel Louise Hindley (born 30 December 1981) is a New Zealand badminton player. She won the women's singles gold at the Oceania Championships in 2006 and also women's doubles gold in 2008. She competed at the Melbourne Commonwealth Games in the women's singles, doubles, and team event; and reaching the quarter-finals in the singles event.

== Achievements ==
=== Oceania Championships ===
Women's singles
| Year | Venue | Opponent | Score | Result |
|---|---|---|---|---|
| 2008 | Nouméa, New Caledonia | (New Zealand) Michelle Chan | 24–26, 20–22 | Silver |
| 2006 | Auckland, New Zealand | (New Zealand) Renee Flavell | 20–22, 21–11, 21–15 | Gold |
| 2004 | Waitakere City, New Zealand | (Australia) Lenny Permana | 7–11, 5–11 | Bronze |

Women's doubles
| Year | Venue | Partner | Opponent | Score | Result |
|---|---|---|---|---|---|
| 2008 | Nouméa, New Caledonia | (New Zealand) Michelle Chan | (New Zealand) Renee Flavell (New Zealand) Donna Cranston | 21–14, 21–8 | Gold |
| 2006 | Auckland, New Zealand | (New Zealand) Rebecca Bellingham | (New Zealand) Sara Runesten-Petersen (New Zealand) Nicole Gordon | 16–21, 21–23 | Silver |

=== BWF Grand Prix ===
The BWF Grand Prix has two levels: Grand Prix and Grand Prix Gold. It is a series of badminton tournaments, sanctioned by the Badminton World Federation (BWF) since 2007. The World Badminton Grand Prix sanctioned by International Badminton Federation (IBF) since 1983.

Women's singles
| Year | Tournament | Opponent | Score | Result |
|---|---|---|---|---|
| 2008 | New Zealand Open | (Hong Kong) Zhou Mi | 10–21, 15–21 | (silver) Runner-up |

Women's doubles
| Year | Tournament | Partner | Opponent | Score | Result |
|---|---|---|---|---|---|
| 2005 | New Zealand Open | (New Zealand) Rebecca Bellingham | (New Zealand) Nicole Gordon (New Zealand) Sara Runesten-Petersen | 15–7, 15–8 | (gold) Winner |

BWF Grand Prix Gold tournament
BWF Grand Prix tournament

=== BWF International Challenge/Series ===
Women's singles
| Year | Tournament | Opponent | Score | Result |
|---|---|---|---|---|
| 2006 | North Harbour International | (Australia) Huang Chia-Chi | 7–21, 12–21 | (silver) Runner-up |
| 2005 | OCBC Yonex International | (United States) Lili Zhou | 6–11, 1–11 | (silver) Runner-up |
| 2005 | Waikato International | (Australia) Lenny Permana | 11–4, 4–5 retired | (gold) Winner |
| 2000 | New Caledonia International | (New Zealand) Renee Flavell | 8–11, 9–11 | (silver) Runner-up |

Women's doubles
| Year | Tournament | Partner | Opponent | Score | Result |
|---|---|---|---|---|---|
| 2009 | Auckland International | (New Zealand) Michelle Chan | (Indonesia) Jenna Gozali (Indonesia) Rufika Olivta | 16–21, 11–21 | (silver) Runner-up |
| 2008 | Waikato International | (New Zealand) Renee Flavell | (Japan) Ayaka Takahashi (Japan) Koharu Yonemoto | 18–21, 19–21 | (silver) Runner-up |
| 2008 | North Shore City International | (New Zealand) Renee Flavell | (Japan) Ayaka Takahashi (Japan) Koharu Yonemoto | 9–21, 15–21 | (silver) Runner-up |
| 2005 | North Harbour International | (New Zealand) Kimberly Windsor | (New Zealand) Donna Cranston (New Zealand) Renee Flavell | 21–12, 21–10 | (gold) Winner |
| 2005 | Waikato International | (New Zealand) Rebecca Bellingham | (Australia) Kellie Lucas (Australia) Kate Wilson-Smith | 15–13, 5–15, 15–11 | (gold) Winner |
| 2004 | New Zealand International | (New Zealand) Rebecca Gordon | (New Zealand) Renee Flavell (New Zealand) Gabriel Shirley | 15–6, 15–0 | (gold) Winner |
| 2004 | Canterbury International | (New Zealand) Rebecca Gordon | (Japan) Noriko Okuma (Japan) Miyuki Tai | 2–15, 7–15 | (silver) Runner-up |
| 2003 | New Zealand International | (New Zealand) Lianne Shirley | (New Zealand) Nicole Gordon (New Zealand) Rebecca Gordon | 9–15, 1–15 | (silver) Runner-up |
| 2001 | Manukau International | (New Zealand) Tammy Jenkins | (New Zealand) Rhona Robertson (New Zealand) Sara Runesten-Petersen | 5–7, 1–7, 0–7 | (silver) Runner-up |
| 2001 | North Harbour International | (New Zealand) Tammy Jenkins | (New Zealand) Rhona Robertson (New Zealand) Sara Runesten-Petersen | 2–7, 0–7, 1–7 | (silver) Runner-up |

BWF International Challenge tournament
BWF International Series tournament
BWF Future Series tournament
