= Glenn Warfe =

Australian badminton player (born 1984)

Personal information
- Born: 19 January 1984 (age 42) Werribee, Victoria, Australia
- Height: 1.80 m (5 ft 11 in)
- Weight: 72 kg (159 lb)

Sport
- Country: Australia
- Sport: Badminton
- Handedness: Right

Men's & mixed doubles
- Highest ranking: 31 (MD) 7 June 2012; 51 (XD) 7 June 2012
- BWF profile
Medal record
Badminton
Representing Australia
Oceania Championships
Gold medal – first place	2014 Ballarat	Men's doubles
Gold medal – first place	2012 Ballarat	Men's doubles
Gold medal – first place	2010 Invercargill	Men's doubles
Gold medal – first place	2010 Invercargill	Mixed doubles
Gold medal – first place	2008 Nouméa	Men's doubles
Silver medal – second place	2012 Ballarat	Mixed doubles
Bronze medal – third place	2006 Auckland	Men's doubles
Oceania Mixed Team Championships
Gold medal – first place	2014 Ballarat	Mixed team
Gold medal – first place	2012 Ballarat	Mixed team
Gold medal – first place	2010 Invercargill	Mixed team
Silver medal – second place	2008 Nouméa	Mixed team
Silver medal – second place	2006 Auckland	Mixed team
Oceania Men's Team Championships
Gold medal – first place	2010 Invercargill	Men's team
Silver medal – second place	2012 Ballarat	Men's team
Silver medal – second place	2008 Nouméa	Men's team
Silver medal – second place	2006 Auckland	Men's team

Glenn Warfe (born 19 January 1984) is an Australian badminton player. He competed for Australia at the 2008 and 2012 Summer Olympics.

== Achievements ==
=== Oceania Championships ===
Men's doubles
Year	Venue	Partner	Opponent	Score	Result
2014	Ken Kay Badminton Stadium; Ballarat, Australia	(Australia) Raymond Tam	(Australia) Matthew Chau (Australia) Sawan Serasinghe	21–11, 21–13	Gold
2012	Ken Kay Badminton Stadium; Ballarat, Australia	(Australia) Ross Smith	(New Zealand) Kevin Dennerly-Minturn (New Zealand) Oliver Leydon-Davis	21–17, 21–18	Gold
2010	Stadium Southland; Invercargill, New Zealand	(Australia) Ross Smith	(New Zealand) Oliver Leydon-Davis (New Zealand) Henry Tam	21–19, 21–12	Gold
2008	Nouméa, New Caledonia	(Australia) Ross Smith	(New Zealand) Nathan Hannam (New Zealand) Henry Tam	21–13, 21–18	Gold
2006	Auckland, New Zealand	(Australia) Ross Smith	(New Zealand) John Gordon (New Zealand) Daniel Shirley	15–21, 16–21	Bronze

Mixed doubles
Year	Venue	Partner	Opponent	Score	Result
2012	Ken Kay Badminton Stadium; Ballarat, Australia	(Australia) Leanne Choo	(Australia) Raymond Tam (Australia) Eugenia Tanaka	17–21, 19–21	Silver
2010	Stadium Southland; Invercargill, New Zealand	(Australia) Kate Wilson-Smith	(New Zealand) Henry Tam (New Zealand) Donna Haliday	21–11, 21–10	Gold

=== BWF International Challenge/Series ===
Men's doubles
Year	Tournament	Partner	Opponent	Score	Result
2014	Maribyrnong International	(Australia) Raymond Tam	(Malaysia) Jagdish Singh (Malaysia) Roni Tan Wee Long	14–21, 19–21	(silver) Runner-up
2013	Victorian International	(Australia) Raymond Tam	(Australia) Robin Middleton (Australia) Ross Smith	19–21, 21–19, 17–21	(silver) Runner-up
2013	Auckland International	(Australia) Raymond Tam	(Australia) Robin Middleton (Australia) Ross Smith	16–21, 8–21	(silver) Runner-up
2012	Tahiti International	(Australia) Ross Smith	(Canada) Adrian Liu (Canada) Derrick Ng	21–23, 13–21	(silver) Runner-up
2011	Altona International	(Australia) Ross Smith	(New Zealand) Kevin Dennerly-Minturn (New Zealand) Oliver Leydon-Davis	21–17, 21–13	(gold) Winner
2010	Tahiti International	(Australia) Ross Smith	(New Zealand) Maoni Hu He (New Zealand) Oliver Leydon-Davis	21–11, 21–12	(gold) Winner
2010	Altona International	(Australia) Ross Smith	(United States) Daniel Gouw (United States) Arnold Setiadi	21–16, 21–10	(gold) Winner
2009	Victorian International	(Australia) Benjamin Walklate	(Australia) Ben McCarthy (Australia) Raj Veeran	21–15, 21–19	(gold) Winner
2006	Waikato International	(Australia) Ross Smith	(New Zealand) Chance Cheng (New Zealand) Joe Wu	20–22, 21–17, 21–9	(gold) Winner
2006	Ballarat International	(Australia) Ross Smith	(Australia) Ashley Brehaut (Malaysia) Roslin Hashim	21–12, 21–16	(gold) Winner
2005	New Caledonian International	(Australia) Ross Smith	(New Zealand) Stuart Gomez (New Zealand) Scott Menzies	15–8, 15–7	(gold) Winner
2005	Fiji International	(Australia) Ross Smith	(Fiji) Damien Ah Sam (Fiji) Burty Molia	15–7, 15–1	(gold) Winner

Mixed doubles
Year	Tournament	Partner	Opponent	Score	Result
2011	Brazil International	(Australia) Leanne Choo	(United States) Halim Ho (United States) Eva Lee	11–21, 15–21	(silver) Runner-up
2011	Altona International	(Australia) Leanne Choo	(New Zealand) Kevin Dennerly-Minturn (New Zealand) Stephanie Cheng	22–20, 21–11	(gold) Winner
2010	Tahiti International	(Australia) Leanne Choo	(Australia) Ross Smith (Australia) Kate Wilson-Smith	14–21, 21–13, 18–21	(silver) Runner-up
2010	Altona International	(Australia) Kate Wilson-Smith	(Australia) Raj Veeran (Australia) Renuga Veeran	21–15, 16–21, 12–21	(silver) Runner-up
2009	Auckland International	(Australia) Renuga Veeran	(Australia) Chad Whitehead (Australia) Eugenia Tanaka	21–12, 21–15	(gold) Winner
2006	Victorian International	(Australia) Susan Dobson	(New Zealand) Daniel Shirley (New Zealand) Renee Flavell	17–21, 14–21	(silver) Runner-up
2005	New Caledonian International	(Australia) Tania Luiz	(New Zealand) Scott Menzies (New Zealand) Renee Flavell	5–15, 10–15	(silver) Runner-up

BWF International Challenge tournament
BWF International Series tournament
BWF Future Series tournament
