= Michelle Chan (badminton) =

Hongkonger-born New Zealand badminton player (born 1987)

Personal information
- Born: Chan Kit Ying; 19 May 1987 (age 39) Hong Kong
- Height: 1.67 m (5 ft 6 in)
- Weight: 56 kg (123 lb)

Sport
- Country: New Zealand
- Sport: Badminton
- Handedness: Right

Women's singles & doubles
- Highest ranking: 37 (WS, 7 June 2012); 92 (WD, 22 October 2009); 383 (XD, 28 March 2013)
- BWF profile
Medal record
Womens' badminton
Representing New Zealand
Oceania Championships
Gold medal – first place	2008 Nouméa	Women's singles
Gold medal – first place	2008 Nouméa	Women's doubles
Gold medal – first place	2012 Ballarat	Women's singles
Silver medal – second place	2014 Ballarat	Women's singles
Bronze medal – third place	2006 Auckland	Women's singles
Oceania Mixed Team Championships
Gold medal – first place	2008 Nouméa	Mixed team
Silver medal – second place	2016 Auckland	Mixed team
Silver medal – second place	2014 Ballarat	Mixed team
Silver medal – second place	2012 Ballarat	Mixed team
Silver medal – second place	2010 Invercargill	Mixed team
Oceania Women's Team Championships
Gold medal – first place	2016 Auckland	Women's team
Silver medal – second place	2012 Ballarat	Women's team
Silver medal – second place	2010 Invercargill	Women's team

Michelle Chan Kit Ying (born 19 May 1987) is a Hongkonger-born New Zealand badminton player. She represented New Zealand at the 2010 Commonwealth Games in Delhi, where she finished 9th in singles, and the 2014 Commonwealth Games in Glasgow, where she reached the quarter-finals. Chan won the Oceania Champion in the women's singles in 2008 and 2012, and also in the women's doubles in 2012. To further her professional development, she spent several years based in Denmark to compete against world-class opposition while simultaneously completing a psychology degree from Massey University.

== Achievements ==
=== Oceania Championships ===
Women's singles
Year	Venue	Opponent	Score	Result
2006	North Harbour Badminton Centre; Auckland, New Zealand	(New Zealand) Renee Flavell	18–21, 21–11, 16–21	Bronze
2008	Salle Veyret; Nouméa, New Caledonia	(New Zealand) Rachel Hindley	26–24, 22–20	Gold
2012	Ken Kay Badminton Stadium; Ballarat, Australia	(Australia) Verdet Kessler	21–10, 21–17	Gold
2014	Ken Kay Badminton Stadium, Ballarat, Australia	(Australia) Verdet Kessler	23–21, 14–21, 14–21	Silver

Women's doubles
Year	Venue	Partner	Opponent	Score	Result
2008	Salle Veyret; Nouméa, New Caledonia	(New Zealand) Rachel Hindley	(New Zealand) Donna Cranston (New Zealand) Renee Flavell	21–14, 21–8	Gold

=== BWF International Challenge/Series ===
Women's singles
Year	Tournament	Opponent	Score	Result
2007	Fiji International	(Australia) Foong Meng Cheah	18–21, 21–15, 21–8	(gold) Winner
2007	Samoa International	(New Zealand) Renee Flavell	21–11, 23–21	(gold) Winner
2011	Estonian International	(India) Arundhati Pantawane	21–16, 21–19	(gold) Winner

Women's doubles
Year	Tournament	Partner	Opponent	Score	Result
2007	Fiji International	(New Zealand) Renee Flavell	(Australia) Susan Dobson (Australia) Tania Luiz	21–15, 21–15	(gold) Winner
2007	Samoa International	(New Zealand) Renee Flavell	(Australia) Susan Dobson (Australia) Tania Luiz	17–21, 21–11, 16–21	(silver) Runner-up
2009	Auckland International	(New Zealand) Rachel Hindley	(Indonesia) Jenna Gozali (Indonesia) Rufika Olivta	16–21, 11–21	(silver) Runner-up

BWF International Challenge tournament
BWF International Series tournament
BWF Future Series tournament
