= Sara Petersen =

Sara Petersen may refer to:

- Sara Petersen (badminton) (born 1975), New Zealand badminton player
- Sara Petersen (hurdler) (born 1987), Danish 400 metres hurdler
