= John Moody (badminton) =

New Zealand badminton player (born 1983)

Personal information
- Born: John David Moody; 21 February 1983 (age 43) Whangārei, New Zealand
- Height: 1.81 m (5 ft 11 in)
- Weight: 78 kg (172 lb)

Sport
- Country: New Zealand
- Sport: Badminton
- Handedness: Right
- Coached by: Tjitte Weistra
- Event: Men's singles & doubles

Men's singles & doubles
- BWF profile
Medal record
Men's badminton
Representing New Zealand
Oceania Championships
Gold medal – first place	2008 Nouméa	Men's singles
Silver medal – second place	2006 Auckland	Men's singles
Bronze medal – third place	2004 Waitakere City	Men's singles
Bronze medal – third place	2002 Suva	Mixed doubles
Oceania Mixed Team Championships
Gold medal – first place	2008 Nouméa	Mixed team
Gold medal – first place	2006 Auckland	Mixed team
Gold medal – first place	2004 Waitakere City	Mixed team
Silver medal – second place	2002 Suva	Mixed team
Oceania Men's Team Championships
Gold medal – first place	2008 Nouméa	Men's team
Gold medal – first place	2006 Auckland	Men's team
Gold medal – first place	2004 Ballarat	Men's team

John David Moody (born 21 February 1983) is a New Zealand badminton player. In 2002 and 2004 he won the Fiji International, in 2005 the Ballarat Eureka International and the Waikato International, and in 2006 the North Harbour International and the Waikato International.

He represented New Zealand at the 2006 Commonwealth Games and 2008 Summer Olympics. At the Commonwealth Games, Moody reaching in to the third round in the men's singles event, quarterfinalists in the men's doubles event, and also the semi-finalists in the mixed team event. He won a match in the bronze medal match against the Indian team, but his team was defeated 3–1.

At the Olympic Games in Beijing, China, Moody was defeated in the second round by Chinese player Chen Jin in straight games with the score 9–21, 11–21.

== Achievements ==
=== Oceania Championships ===
Men's singles
Year	Venue	Opponent	Score	Result
2008	Nouméa, New Caledonia	(Australia) Stuart Gomez	21–12, 21–16	Gold
2006	Auckland, New Zealand	(New Zealand) Geoffrey Bellingham	21–13, 16–21, 8–21	Silver
2004	Waitakere City, New Zealand	(Australia) Leonard Tjoe	13–15, 15–17	Bronze

Mixed doubles
Year	Venue	Partner	Opponent	Score	Result
2002	Suva, Fiji	(New Zealand) Lianne Shirley	(Australia) Travis Denney (Australia) Kate Wilson-Smith	3–7, 0–7, 3–7	Bronze

=== BWF International Challenge/Series ===
Men's singles
Year	Tournament	Opponent	Score	Result
2008	North Shore City International	(India) Ajay Jayaram	21–16, 22–20	(gold) Winner
2007	North Shore City International	(France) Erwin Kehlhoffner	16–21, 18–21	(silver) Runner-up
2007	Australian International	(Portugal) Marco Vasconcelos	21–16, 22–20	(gold) Winner
2006	Waikato International	(Wales) Richard Vaughan	11–21, 21–16, 22–20	(gold) Winner
2006	North Harbour International	(England) Nicholas Kidd	21–19, 22–20	(gold) Winner
2006	Ballarat International	(England) Nicholas Kidd	18–21, 15–21	(silver) Runner-up
2005	Waikato International	(Japan) Yousuke Nakanishi	17–15, 15–8	(gold) Winner
2005	North Harbour International	(New Zealand) Geoffrey Bellingham	12–15, 11–15	(silver) Runner-up
2004	Fiji International	(Fiji) Burty Molia	15–4, 15–1	(gold) Winner
2002	Fiji International	(Fiji) Burty Molia	15–1, 15–3	(gold) Winner

Men's doubles
Year	Tournament	Partner	Opponent	Score	Result
2008	North Shore City International	(New Zealand) John Gordon	(Japan) Rei Sato (Japan) Naomasa Senkyo	11–21, 21–15, 13–21	(silver) Runner-up
2007	North Shore City International	(New Zealand) Alan Chan	(New Zealand) Nathan Hannam (New Zealand) Henry Tam	18–21, 21–14, 21–9	(gold) Winner
2004	Fiji International	(New Zealand) Mark Robertson	(Fiji) Damien Ah Sam (Fiji) Burty Molia	15–11, 15–6	(gold) Winner
2002	Fiji International	(Fiji) Andy Wong	(Fiji) Damien Ah Sam (Fiji) Burty Molia	8–15, 11–15	(silver) Runner-up

Mixed doubles
Year	Tournament	Partner	Opponent	Score	Result
2004	Fiji International	(New Zealand) Lynne Scutt	(New Zealand) Mark Robertson (New Zealand) Jolee Stewart	15–11, 15–13	(gold) Winner
2000	Nouméa International	(New Zealand) Renee Flavell	(Australia) Nathan Malpass (Australia) Diane Malpass	15–3, 15–8	(gold) Winner

BWF International Challenge tournament
BWF International Series tournament
