= Nicole Gordon (badminton) =

New Zealand badminton player (born 1976)

Medal record

Women's badminton

Representing New Zealand

Commonwealth Games
Silver medal – second place	2002 Manchester	Women's doubles
Bronze medal – third place	2002 Manchester	Mixed team

Nicole Gordon (born 17 March 1976) is a badminton player from New Zealand. At the 2002 Commonwealth Games she won a silver medal with Sara Petersen in women's doubles, and a bronze medal in the mixed team event.
