= Rhona Robertson =

New Zealand badminton player

Medal record

Women's badminton

Representing New Zealand

Commonwealth Games
Bronze medal – third place	1994 Victoria	Women's singles
Bronze medal – third place	1998 Kuala Lumpur	Women's doubles
Bronze medal – third place	2002 Manchester	Mixed team

Rhona Robertson (born 19 July 1970 in Auckland, New Zealand) is a former female badminton player from New Zealand. She is a veteran of two Olympic Games and four Commonwealth Games.

Robertson started playing badminton at the age of nine at Howick Badminton Club, and later attended Macleans College.

Robertson reached a career-high singles ranking of 22 in 1998, and her doubles ranking peaked when she become 9th in the world in 2002.

At the 1994 Commonwealth Games she won a bronze medal in the women's singles. Robertson won another bronze medal at the 1998 Commonwealth Games partnering Tammy Jenkins in the women's doubles. Four years later at the 2002 Commonwealth Games she won another bronze medal in the mixed team.
