= Ashley Brehaut =

Australian badminton player (born 1980)

Personal information
- Full name: Ashley John Brehaut
- Born: 18 September 1980 (age 46) Ballarat, Victoria, Australia
- Height: 1.80 m (5 ft 11 in)
- Weight: 75 kg (165 lb)

Sport
- Country: Australia
- Sport: Badminton
- Event: Men's & mixed doubles

Men's & mixed doubles
- BWF profile
Medal record
Badminton
Representing Australia
Oceania Championships
Bronze medal – third place	2006 Auckaland	Men's doubles
Oceania Men's Team Championships
Silver medal – second place	2006 Auckland	Men's team

Ashley John Brehaut (born 18 September 1980) is a now retired male badminton player from Australia.

Brehaut competed in badminton at the 2004 Summer Olympics in men's doubles with partner Travis Denney. They were defeated in the round of 32 by Pramote Teerawiwatana and Tesana Panvisvas of Thailand. In 2006, he and Denney won the bronze medal at the Oceania Championships, and also competed at the Commonwealth Games. His brother Stuart is also a former Olympic badminton player.

He now works as a physical education teacher.
