= David Bamford =

Australian badminton player

Personal information
- Nickname: Ambitious
- Born: David Phillip Bamford; 29 March 1976 (age 50) Melbourne, Victoria, Australia
- Height: 172 cm (5 ft 8 in)
- Weight: 74 kg (163 lb)

Sport
- Country: Australia
- Sport: Badminton
- Event: Men's doubles/Mixed Doubles
- Updated on 6 January 2011

David Phillip Bamford (born 29 March 1976 in Melbourne, Victoria) is a former Australian badminton player.

On 22 June 2000, Bamford was awarded the Australian Sports Medal for his badminton achievements.
