= Stuart Brehaut =

Australian badminton player

Stuart Brehaut (born 24 September 1978) is a badminton player from Australia.

Brehaut played badminton at the 2004 Summer Olympics in men's singles, losing comprehensively in the first round to Lee Hyun-il of Korea 15–3 15–2.

He competed in both the 1998, 2002, 2006 Commonwealth Games, achieving a fifth-place finish in the 2002 teams event. At the 2006 Games in Kuala Lumpur he competed alongside his brother Ashley Brehaut.
