= Nick Hall (badminton) =

New Zealand badminton player

Personal information
- Born: Nicholas Mark Hall; 19 September 1970 (age 56) Adelaide, South Australia, Australia

Sport
- Country: New Zealand
- Sport: Badminton
Medal record
Men's badminton
Representing New Zealand
Commonwealth Games
Bronze medal – third place	1994 Victoria	Men's singles
Bronze medal – third place	1998 Kuala Lumpur	Mixed team
Bronze medal – third place	2002 Manchester	Mixed team

Nicholas Mark Hall (born 19 September 1970) is a former badminton competitor for New Zealand. He won bronze medals at three successive Commonwealth Games badminton tournaments between 1994 and 2002.

== Early life and family ==
Hall was born in Adelaide, South Australia, on 19 September 1970, the son of Barry and Elaine Hall. He was educated at Westlake Boys High School from 1983 to 1987, and went on to study at the University of Auckland, graduating with a Bachelor of Science degree in 1992.

== Badminton career ==
He has won three bronze medals at the Commonwealth Games. At the 1994 Commonwealth Games he won the bronze medal in the men's singles competition. Four years later at the 1998 Commonwealth Games he won a bronze medal in the men's team event. His last bronze medal was won at the 2002 Commonwealth Games in the mixed team event.

In 1990, Hall was awarded the New Zealand 1990 Commemoration Medal.
