= Travis Denney =

Australian badminton player (born 1976)

Travis Denney (born 19 February 1976) is a male badminton player from Australia.

Denney competed in badminton at the 2004 Summer Olympics in men's doubles with partner Ashley Brehaut. They were defeated in the round of 32 by Pramote Teerawiwatana and Tesana Panvisvas of Thailand. In mixed doubles, Denney and partner Kate Wilson-Smith lost to Björn Siegemund and Nicol Pitro of Germany in the round of 32.
