= Renee Flavell =

New Zealand badminton player (born 1982)

Personal information
- Born: 28 March 1982 (age 44) Auckland, New Zealand

Sport
- Country: New Zealand
- Sport: Badminton

Renee Kimberly Flavell (born 28 March 1982 in Auckland) is a badminton player from New Zealand.

== Career ==
Renee Flavell took part at the 2008 Beijing Olympic Games and reached rank 9 in the mixed doubles. At the 2006 Oceania championships she won two bronze medals and one silver medal. Two years later Flavell won two silver medals. In 2007 she triumphed at the Australian Open.

== Results ==
Year	Tournament	Event	Rank	Name
2005	Australian Open	Women's doubles	2	Lianne Shirley / Renee Flavell
2006	Victorian International	Women's doubles	1	Donna Cranston / Renee Flavell
2006	Oceania championships	Women's doubles	3	Renee Flavell / Donna Cranston
2006	Oceania championships	Mixed doubles	3	Craig Cooper / Renee Flavell
2006	Oceania championships	Women's singles	2	Renee Flavell
2006	Victorian International	Mixed doubles	1	Daniel Shirley / Renee Flavell
2006	Australian Open	Mixed doubles	2	Renee Flavell / Craig Cooper
2007	Victorian International	Women's doubles	2	Renee Flavell / Donna Cranston
2007	Samoa Future Series	Mixed doubles	1	Craig Cooper / Renee Flavell
2007	Victorian International	Mixed doubles	1	Craig Cooper / Renee Flavell
2007	Samoa Future Series	Women's doubles	2	Renee Flavell / Michelle Chan
2007	Fiji International	Mixed doubles	1	Craig Cooper / Renee Flavell
2007	Samoa Future Series	Women's singles	2	Renee Flavell
2007	Fiji International	Women's doubles	1	Renee Flavell / Michelle Chan
2007	Australian Open	Mixed doubles	1	Craig Cooper / Renee Flavell
2008	Oceania championships	Mixed doubles	2	Craig Cooper / Renee Flavell
2008	Oceania championships	Women's doubles	2	Renee Flavell / Donna Cranston
2008	New Zealand Open	Women's doubles	3	Renee Flavell / Rachel Hindley
2008	Olympic Games	Mixed doubles	9	Craig Cooper / Renee Flavell
