= Tammy Jenkins =

New Zealand badminton player (born 1971)

Medal record

Women's badminton

Representing New Zealand

Commonwealth Games
Bronze medal – third place	1998 Kuala Lumpur	Women's doubles
Bronze medal – third place	2002 Manchester	Mixed team

Sharon Tina "Tammy" Jenkins (born 26 August 1971 in Kawakawa, New Zealand) is a badminton player from New Zealand. She competed at the 1994 Commonwealth Games in Victoria, Canada. At the 1998 Commonwealth Games she won a bronze medal partnering Rhona Robertson in women's doubles. Four years later at the 2002 Commonwealth Games, she won another bronze medal in the mixed team.

Jenkins also represented New Zealand at the 1992 Summer Olympics in Barcelona, and the 1996 Summer Olympics in Atlanta, both in ladies' doubles with Rhona Robertson.
