= Geoff Bellingham =

New Zealand badminton player (born 1976)

Medal record

Representing New Zealand

Men's badminton

Commonwealth Games
Bronze medal – third place	1998 Kuala Lumpur	Team
Bronze medal – third place	2002 Manchester	Mixed Team

Geoff Bellingham (born 3 March 1976) is a male badminton player from New Zealand. At the 1998 Commonwealth Games he won a bronze medal in the men's team event. Four years later at the 2002 Commonwealth Games he won a bronze medal in the mixed team event. He made his international debut in 1997.
