= Kate Wilson-Smith =

Australian badminton player (born 1979)

Personal information
- Country: Australia
- Born: 9 January 1979 (age 46)
- Height: 1.74 m (5 ft 9 in)
Medal record
Women's badminton
Representing Australia
Commonwealth Games
| Bronze medal – third place | 1998 Kuala Lumpur | Women's team |
| Bronze medal – third place | 2010 Delhi | Women's doubles |
- BWF profile

Kate Nicole Wilson-Smith (born 9 January 1979) is a female badminton player from Australia.

Wilson-Smith competed in badminton at the 2004 Summer Olympics in women's doubles with partner Jane Crabtree. They were defeated by Pernille Harder and Mette Schjoldager of Denmark in the round of 32. In mixed doubles, Wilson-Smith and partner Travis Denney lost to Björn Siegemund and Nicol Pitro of Germany in the round of 32.

At the 2010 Commonwealth Games, she won a bronze medal in the women's doubles, competing with countrywoman Tang He Tian.
