= Sara Petersen (badminton) =

Danish-New Zealand badminton player (born 1975)

Sara Runesten-Petersen
Personal information
- Born: 8 May 1975 (age 51) Denmark
- Height: 1.73 m (5 ft 8 in)

Sport
- Country: New Zealand
- Sport: Badminton
- Event: Doubles

Doubles
- BWF profile
Medal record
Women's badminton
Representing New Zealand
World Championships
Bronze medal – third place	2005 Anaheim	Mixed doubles
Commonwealth Games
Silver medal – second place	2002 Manchester	Women's doubles
Silver medal – second place	2006 Melbourne	Mixed doubles
Bronze medal – third place	2002 Manchester	Mixed doubles
Bronze medal – third place	2002 Manchester	Mixed team
Representing Denmark
European Junior Championships
Gold medal – first place	1993 Sofia	Mixed doubles
Gold medal – first place	1993 Sofia	Mixed team
Silver medal – second place	1993 Sofia	Girls' doubles

Sara Runesten Petersen (born 8 May 1975) is a Denmark-born female badminton player from New Zealand.

== Career ==
Petersen competed in badminton at the 2004 Summer Olympics in the mixed doubles with partner Daniel Shirley. They defeated Philippe Bourret and Denyse Julien of Canada in the first round but lost to Jonas Rasmussen and Rikke Olsen of Denmark in the round of 16.

They also won a bronze medal at the 2005 IBF World Championships in the mixed doubles.
