= 2012 Thomas & Uber Cup Preliminaries for Oceania =

Tournament details
- Dates: 18–19 February
- Nations: 4 (Men's team); 3 (Women's team)
- Venue: Ken Kay Badminton Stadium
- Location: Ballarat, Victoria, Australia

The 2012 Thomas & Uber Cup Preliminaries for Oceania was a continental badminton team championships in Oceania sanctioned by the Badminton World Federation. The tournament was held from 18 to 19 February 2012.

== Tournament ==
The 2012 Thomas & Uber Cup Preliminaries for Oceania was a continental team tournament of badminton held to determine the best men's and women's team in Oceania, who would qualify to 2012 Thomas & Uber Cup. This tournament was organized by Badminton Oceania and was sanctioned by the Badminton World Federation.

=== Venue ===
The tournament was held at the Ken Kay Badminton Stadium, Ballarat, Victoria, Australia.

=== Competition format ===
The competition was held using a half-competition system (round-robin) with each team competing against each other once.

=== Tiebreakers ===
The rankings of teams in each group were determined per BWF Statutes Section 5.1, Article 16.3:

1. Number of matches won;
2. Match result between the teams in question;
3. Match difference in all group matches;
4. Game difference in all group matches;
5. Point difference in all group matches.

== Men's team ==
Pos	Team	Pld	W	L	MF	MA	MD	GF	GA	GD	PF	PA	PD	Pts	Qualification
1	New Zealand	3	3	0	13	2	+11	26	7	+19	662	431	+231	3	2012 Thomas Cup
2	Australia (H)	3	2	1	12	3	+9	26	6	+20	638	414	+224	2	
3	New Caledonia	3	1	2	4	11	−7	10	23	−13	445	636	−191	1	
4	Tahiti	3	0	3	1	14	−13	3	29	−26	395	659	−264	0	

Source: BWF
(H) Host

=== Australia vs New Caledonia ===
Australia
5
Ken Kay Badminton Stadium, Court 1
18 February 2012, 11:00 UTC+10

New Caledonia
0

			1	2	3
1	(Australia) (New Caledonia)	Wesley Caulkett; Fabien Kaddour	21; 18	21; 10
2	(Australia) (New Caledonia)	Luke Chong; Loïc Mennesson	21; 7	21; 7
3	(Australia) (New Caledonia)	Stuart Gomez; Morgan Paitio	21; 13	21; 14
4	(Australia) (New Caledonia)	Ben McCarthy / Raymond Tam; Mathieu Martaud / Sandy Suwarno	21; 6	21; 5
5	(Australia) (New Caledonia)	Ross Smith / Glenn Warfe; Morgan Paitio / Joey Santino	21; 6	21; 3

=== Tahiti vs New Zealand ===
Tahiti
0
Ken Kay Badminton Stadium, Court 2
18 February 2012, 11:00 UTC+10

New Zealand
5

			1	2	3
1	(French Polynesia) (New Zealand)	Rémi Rossi; Michael Fowke	13; 21	15; 21
2	(French Polynesia) (New Zealand)	Sébastien Bédrune; James Eunson	5; 21	9; 21
3	(French Polynesia) (New Zealand)	Rauhiri Goguenheim; Luke Charlesworth	6; 21	5; 21
4	(French Polynesia) (New Zealand)	Frédéric Ploteau / Rémi Rossi; Kevin Dennerly-Minturn / Oliver Leydon-Davis	9; 21	12; 21
5	(French Polynesia) (New Zealand)	Sébastien Bédrune / Rauhiri Goguenheim; Luke Charlesworth / James Eunson	8; 21	14; 21

=== Australia vs Tahiti ===
Australia
5
Ken Kay Badminton Stadium, Court 1
18 February 2012, 17:00 UTC+10

Tahiti
0

			1	2	3
1	(Australia) (French Polynesia)	Wesley Caulkett; Rémi Rossi	21; 12	21; 10
2	(Australia) (French Polynesia)	Luke Chong; Frédéric Ploteau	21; 11	21; 13
3	(Australia) (French Polynesia)	Jeff Tho; Sébastien Bédrune	21; 13	21; 9
4	(Australia) (French Polynesia)	Ross Smith / Glenn Warfe; Frédéric Ploteau / Rémi Rossi	21; 13	21; 7
5	(Australia) (French Polynesia)	Ben McCarthy / Raymond Tam; Sébastien Bédrune / Rauhiri Goguenheim	21; 7	21; 7

=== New Caledonia vs New Zealand ===
New Caledonia
0
Ken Kay Badminton Stadium, Court 2
18 February 2012, 17:00 UTC+10

New Zealand
5

			1	2	3
1	(New Caledonia) (New Zealand)	Fabien Kaddour; Michael Fowke	21; 19	11; 21	14; 21
2	(New Caledonia) (New Zealand)	Joey Santino; James Eunson	7; 21	11; 21
3	(New Caledonia) (New Zealand)	Fabien Kaddour / Loïc Mennesson; Kevin Dennerly-Minturn / Oliver Leydon-Davis	8; 21	10; 21
4	(New Caledonia) (New Zealand)	Sandy Suwarno; Luke Charlesworth	6; 21	8; 21
5	(New Caledonia) (New Zealand)	Morgan Paitio / Joey Santino; James Eunson / Michael Fowke	12; 21	9; 21

=== Australia vs New Zealand ===
Australia
2
Ken Kay Badminton Stadium, Court 1
19 February 2012, 17:00 UTC+10

New Zealand
3

			1	2	3
1	(Australia) (New Zealand)	Wesley Caulkett; Michael Fowke	21; 12	21; 17
2	(Australia) (New Zealand)	Luke Chong; James Eunson	14; 21	8; 21
3	(Australia) (New Zealand)	Ross Smith / Glenn Warfe; Kevin Dennerly-Minturn / Oliver Leydon-Davis	24; 22	8; 21	21; 23
4	(Australia) (New Zealand)	Jeff Tho; Luke Charlesworth	21; 19	21; 17
5	(Australia) (New Zealand)	Ben McCarthy / Raymond Tam; James Eunson / Michael Fowke	19; 21	21; 8	19; 21

=== New Caledonia vs Tahiti ===
New Caledonia
4
Ken Kay Badminton Stadium, Court 2
19 February 2012, 17:00 UTC+10

Tahiti
1

			1	2	3
1	(New Caledonia) (French Polynesia)	Fabien Kaddour; Rémi Rossi	21; 12	18; 21	21; 18
2	(New Caledonia) (French Polynesia)	Loïc Mennesson; Frédéric Ploteau	21; 18	21; 16
3	(New Caledonia) (French Polynesia)	Morgan Paitio; Sébastien Bédrune	21; 11	21; 18
4	(New Caledonia) (French Polynesia)	Fabien Kaddour / Loïc Mennesson; Frédéric Ploteau / Rémi Rossi	21; 16	21; 11
5	(New Caledonia) (French Polynesia)	Mathieu Martaud / Sandy Suwarno; Sébastien Bédrune / Rauhiri Goguenheim	14; 21	21; 14	18; 21

== Women's team ==
Pos	Team	Pld	W	L	MF	MA	MD	GF	GA	GD	PF	PA	PD	Pts	Qualification
1	Australia (H)	2	2	0	9	1	+8	18	2	+16	404	197	+207	2	2012 Uber Cup
2	New Zealand	2	1	1	6	4	+2	12	8	+4	336	278	+58	1	
3	New Caledonia	2	0	2	0	10	−10	0	20	−20	155	420	−265	0	

Source: BWF
(H) Host

=== New Caledonia vs New Zealand ===
New Caledonia
0
Ken Kay Badminton Stadium, Court 4
18 February 2012, 11:00 UTC+10

New Zealand
5

			1	2	3
1	(New Caledonia) (New Zealand)	Johanna Kou; Michelle Chan	11; 21	10; 21
2	(New Caledonia) (New Zealand)	Magali Bravo; Amanda Brown	10; 21	9; 21
3	(New Caledonia) (New Zealand)	Lorinda Sautes; Anna Rankin	4; 21	6; 21
4	(New Caledonia) (New Zealand)	Johanna Kou / Lorinda Sautes; Amanda Brown / Stephanie Cheng	13; 21	11; 21
5	(New Caledonia) (New Zealand)	Nadia Kasimun / Cecilia Moussy; Michelle Chan / Anna Rankin	4; 21	6; 21

=== New Caledonia vs Australia ===
New Caledonia
0
Ken Kay Badminton Stadium, Court 4
18 February 2012, 17:00 UTC+10

Australia
5

			1	2	3
1	(New Caledonia) (Australia)	Johanna Kou; Victoria Na	6; 21	9; 21
2	(New Caledonia) (Australia)	Magali Bravo; Verdet Kessler	13; 21	3; 21
3	(New Caledonia) (Australia)	Lorinda Sautes; Tara Pilven	3; 21	10; 21
4	(New Caledonia) (Australia)	Nadia Kasimun / Cecilia Moussy; Jacqueline Guan / Gronya Somerville	5; 21	9; 21
5	(New Caledonia) (Australia)	Magali Bravo / Lorinda Sautes; Leanne Choo / Renuga Veeran	7; 21	6; 21

=== New Zealand vs Australia ===
New Zealand
1
Ken Kay Badminton Stadium, Court 1
19 February 2012, 11:00 UTC+10

Australia
4

			1	2	3
1	(New Zealand) (Australia)	Michelle Chan; Victoria Na	21; 8	21; 18
2	(New Zealand) (Australia)	Amanda Brown; Renuga Veeran	7; 21	6; 21
3	(New Zealand) (Australia)	Anna Rankin; Verdet Kessler	19; 21	14; 21
4	(New Zealand) (Australia)	Amanda Brown / Stephanie Cheng; Leanne Choo / Tang Hetian	7; 21	5; 21
5	(New Zealand) (Australia)	Michelle Chan / Anna Rankin; Eugenia Tanaka / Renuga Veeran	10; 21	16; 21
