= 2012 Australian Open Grand Prix Gold =

2012 Australia Open Grand Prix Gold
Tournament details
- Dates: April 3, 2012 - April 8, 2012
- Total prize money: US$120,000
- Venue: Sydney Convention and Exhibition Centre
- Location: Sydney, Australia

The 2012 Australia Open Grand Prix Gold was the third grand prix gold and grand prix tournament of the 2012 BWF Grand Prix Gold and Grand Prix. The tournament was held in Sydney Convention and Exhibition Centre, Sydney, Australia April 3 until April 8, 2012 and had a total purse of $120,000.

== Men's singles ==
=== Seeds ===
1. (China) Chen Jin (champion)
2. (Japan) Sho Sasaki (semi-final)
3. (Indonesia) Simon Santoso (semi-final)
4. (Vietnam) Nguyen Tien Minh (final)
5. (Indonesia) Taufik Hidayat (quarter-final)
6. (Indonesia) Tommy Sugiarto (first round)
7. (South Korea) Shon Wan-Ho (quarter-final)
8. (Hong Kong) Wong Wing Ki (second round)
9. (Hong Kong) Hu Yun (third round)
10. (Indonesia) Dionysius Hayom Rumbaka (withdrew)
11. (India) Ajay Jayaram (third round)
12. (Thailand) Boonsak Ponsana (third round)
13. (India) Kashyap Parupalli (second round)
14. (Malaysia) Muhammad Hafiz Hashim (withdrew)
15. (Indonesia) Alamsyah Yunus (quarter-final)
16. (Chinese Taipei) Hsueh Hsuan-Yi (second round)

=== Finals ===
Quarterfinals
1	(China) Chen Jin	21	21
(Japan) Takuma Ueda	17	19
3	(Indonesia) Simon Santoso	21	12	21
7	(South Korea) Shon Wan-Ho	15	21	10
15	(Indonesia) Alamsyah Yunus	9	16
4	(Vietnam) Nguyen Tien Minh	21	21
5	(Indonesia) Taufik Hidayat	11	20
2	(Japan) Sho Sasaki	21	22

Semifinals
1	(China) Chen Jin	22	21
3	(Indonesia) Simon Santoso	20	15
4	(Vietnam) Nguyen Tien Minh	21	21
2	(Japan) Sho Sasaki	19	11

Final
1	(China) Chen Jin	21	21
4	(Vietnam) Nguyen Tien Minh	11	12

=== Top half ===
==== Section 1 ====
First Round
1	(China) Chen J	21	16	21
(Chinese Taipei) Lin Y-H	13	21	12
Q7	(Australia) J Hutton	15	15
PFQ	(Australia) N David	21	21
PFQ	(Australia) N Tang	21	23
(Australia) T Pham	16	21
(Malaysia) Lok CC
PFQ	(Australia) C Chen	wo

Second Round
1	(China) Chen J	21	21
PFQ	(Australia) N David	9	5
PFQ	(Australia) N Tang	10	11
(Malaysia) Lok CC	21	21

Third Round
1	(China) Chen J	21	21
(Malaysia) Lok CC	12	17

==== Section 2 ====
First Round
8	(Hong Kong) Wong WK	21	21
Q1	(Australia) G Ho	4	4
(Thailand) S Avihingsanon	21	21
Q6	(New Zealand) M Phillips	13	10
PFQ	(Australia) M Wheller	16	21	9
Q5	(Australia) A Joe	21	17	21
Q3	(Australia) E Ng	2	0
(Japan) T Ueda	21	21

Second Round
8	(Hong Kong) Wong WK	20	21	17
(Thailand) S Avihingsanon	22	18	21
Q5	(Australia) A Joe	11	5
(Japan) T Ueda	21	21

Third Round
(Thailand) S Avihingsanon	14	11
(Japan) T Ueda	21	21

==== Section 3 ====
First Round
3	(Indonesia) S Santoso	21	21
(New Zealand) J Wu	8	13
(Australia) L Chong	8	14
(Singapore) A Chen	21	21
16	(Chinese Taipei) Hsueh H-Y	21	21
(New Zealand) A Richardson	9	19
(Hong Kong) Chan YK	21	21
(Slovakia) M Matejka	10	11

Second Round
3	(Indonesia) S Santoso	21	21
(Singapore) A Chen	9	14
16	(Chinese Taipei) Hsueh H-Y	13	23	17
(Hong Kong) Chan YK	21	21	21

Third Round
3	(Indonesia) S Santoso	21	15	21
(Hong Kong) Chan YK	16	21	17

==== Section 4 ====
First Round
7	(South Korea) Shon W-H	21	21
(Malaysia) A Abdul Latif	10	12
PFQ	(Australia) C Choong	13	17
(Australia) B Kwok	21	21
11	(India) A Jayaram	21	21
(Australia) M Fariman	10	12
(Malaysia) K Yogendran	21	21
Q2	(Australia) G Lau	8	7

Second Round
7	(South Korea) Shon W-H	21	21
(Australia) B Kwok	7	10
11	(India) A Jayaram	21	21
(Malaysia) K Yogendran	16	9

Third Round
7	(South Korea) Shon W-H	19	21	21
11	(India) A Jayaram	21	12	10

=== Bottom half ===
==== Section 5 ====
First Round
(Indonesia) S Kuncoro	21	21
Q4	(Australia) R Henderson	4	6
(Malaysia) Z Zulkiffli	17	12
15	(Indonesia) A Yunus	21	21
(Slovakia) J Vicen	19	21	8
(Israel) M Zilberman	21	12	21
(South Korea) Hong J-H	21	21
6	(Indonesia) T Sugiarto	15	9

Second Round
(Indonesia) S Kuncoro	11	21	11
15	(Indonesia) A Yunus	21	8	21
(Israel) M Zilberman	15	9
(South Korea) Hong J-H	21	21

Third Round
15	(Indonesia) A Yunus	21	21
(South Korea) Hong J-H	19	17

==== Section 6 ====
First Round
(Australia) J Findlay	3	7
(Malaysia) Chan KB	21	21
(Netherlands) E Pang	18	21	13
13	(India) K Parupalli	21	8	21
(Iran) K Mehrabi	21	21
(Australia) H Buendia	11	10
(Australia) N Oon	8	10
4	(Vietnam) Nguyen TM	21	21

Second Round
(Malaysia) Chan KB	21	17	21
13	(India) K Parupalli	17	21	9
(Iran) K Mehrabi	8	4
4	(Vietnam) Nguyen TM	21	21

Third Round
(Malaysia) Chan KB	21	18	12
4	(Vietnam) Nguyen TM	18	21	21

==== Section 7 ====
First Round
(Australia) P S Low	6	11
(Thailand) T Saensomboonsuk	21	21
(China) Qiao B	18	19
12	(Thailand) B Ponsana	21	21
(New Zealand) J Eunson	19	21	21
(Australia) Chew HW	21	14	9
(Australia) W Caulkett	12	14
5	(Indonesia) T Hidayat	21	21

Second Round
(Thailand) T Saensomboonsuk	16	8
12	(Thailand) B Ponsana	21	21
(New Zealand) J Eunson	6	10
5	(Indonesia) T Hidayat	21	21

Third Round
12	(Thailand) B Ponsana	16	16
5	(Indonesia) T Hidayat	21	21

==== Section 8 ====
First Round
(Chinese Taipei) Hsu J-H	13	17
(Malaysia) Chong WF	21	21
(China) Tian HW	19	14
9	(Hong Kong) Hu Y	21	21
Q8	(Australia) D Guda	5	9
(Malaysia) D Liew	21	21
(Singapore) D Wong	11	15
2	(Japan) S Sasaki	21	21

Second Round
(Malaysia) Chong WF	21	11	19
9	(Hong Kong) Hu Y	12	21	21
(Malaysia) D Liew	9	9
2	(Japan) S Sasaki	21	21

Third Round
9	(Hong Kong) Hu Y	21	11	19
2	(Japan) S Sasaki	15	21	21

== Women's singles ==
=== Seeds ===
1. (China) Li Xuerui (withdrew)
2. (Chinese Taipei) Cheng Shao-Chieh (first round)
3. (South Korea) Sung Ji-Hyun (semi-final)
4. (Thailand) Ratchanok Inthanon (second round)
5. (South Korea) Bae Youn-Joo (final)
6. (Thailand) Porntip Buranaprasertsuk (quarter-final)
7. (Chinese Taipei) Tai Tzu-Ying (first round)
8. (Japan) Sayaka Sato (quarter-final)

=== Finals ===
Semifinals
(Japan) Ai Goto	13	12
5	(South Korea) Bae Youn-Joo	21	21
3	(South Korea) Sung Ji-Hyun	15	12
Q3	(China) Han Li	21	21

Final
5	(South Korea) Bae Youn-Joo	13	14
Q3	(China) Han Li	21	21

=== Top half ===
==== Section 1 ====
First Round
PFQ	(Austria) C Mayer	15	11
(Japan) A Goto	21	21
(Indonesia) A Yuswandari	17	21	22
(Japan) E Hirose	21	15	20
7	(Chinese Taipei) Tai T-Y	9	0^{r}
(Japan) M Mitani	21	2
(Malaysia) Tee JY	21	13	18
Q1	(Malaysia) L Cheah	10	21	21

Second Round
(Japan) A Goto	14	21	21
(Indonesia) A Yuswandari	21	13	14
(Japan) M Mitani	21	21
Q1	(Malaysia) L Cheah	15	12

Quarterfinals
(Japan) A Goto
(Japan) M Mitani	wo

==== Section 2 ====
First Round
4	(Thailand) R Inthanon	22	21
(Netherlands) Yao J	20	15
(Indonesia) A Firdasari	21	19	14
Q2	(China) Wang L	19	21	21
5	(South Korea) Bae Y-J	21	21
(Chinese Taipei) Pai H-M	15	16
(Singapore) Fu MT	21	17	21
(Hong Kong) Chan TK	12	21	14

Second Round
4	(Thailand) R Inthanon	21	9	8
Q2	(China) Wang L	17	21	21
5	(South Korea) Bae Y-J	21	21
(Singapore) Fu MT	16	10

Quarterfinals
Q2	(China) Wang L	14	23	21
5	(South Korea) Bae Y-J	21	21	23

=== Bottom half ===
==== Section 3 ====
First Round
(Australia) V Na	14	9
(Portugal) T Santos	21	21
(Indonesia) L Fanetri	21	22	18
8	(Japan) S Sato	18	24	21
(Indonesia) M Kusumastuti	18	21	20
(Thailand) N Jindapon	21	13	22
Q4	(China) Yao X	14	21	15
3	(South Korea) Sung J-H	21	17	21

Second Round
(Portugal) T Santos	wo
8	(Japan) S Sato
(Thailand) N Jindapon	10	15
3	(South Korea) Sung J-H	21	21

Quarterfinals
8	(Japan) S Sato	15	11
3	(South Korea) Sung J-H	21	21

==== Section 4 ====
First Round
(Singapore) Gu J	10	16
(China) Chen XJ	21	21
(Singapore) Xing AY	18	21	14
6	(Thailand) P Buranaprasertsuk	21	7	21
Q3	(China) Han L	16	21	21
(Japan) K Imabeppu	21	12	13
(Hong Kong) Yip PY	21	21
2	(Chinese Taipei) Cheng S-C	14	14

Second Round
(China) Chen XJ	15	21	15
6	(Thailand) P Buranaprasertsuk	21	14	21
Q3	(China) Han L	21	21
(Hong Kong) Yip PY	17	13

Quarterfinals
6	(Thailand) P Buranaprasertsuk	22	15	15
Q3	(China) Han L	20	21	21

== Men's doubles ==
=== Seeds ===
1. (Indonesia) Mohammad Ahsan / Bona Septano (withdrew)
2. (Japan) Hirokatsu Hashimoto / Noriyasu Hirata (quarter-final)
3. (Chinese Taipei) Fang Chieh-Min / Lee Sheng-Mu (final)
4. (Indonesia) Alvent Yulianto / Hendra Aprida Gunawan (quarter-final)
5. (Japan) Naoki Kawamae / Shoji Sato (quarter-final)
6. (Indonesia) Markis Kido / Hendra Setiawan (champion)
7. (Japan) Hiroyuki Endo / Kenichi Hayakawa (semi-final)
8. (Indonesia) Angga Pratama / Rian Agung Saputro (semi-final)

=== Finals ===
Semifinals
7	(Japan) Hiroyuki Endo (Japan) Kenichi Hayakawa	10	20
3	(Chinese Taipei) Fang Chieh-Min (Chinese Taipei) Lee Sheng-Mu	21	22
6	(Indonesia) Markis Kido (Indonesia) Hendra Setiawan	15	21	21
8	(Indonesia) Angga Pratama (Indonesia) Rian Agung Saputro	21	14	11

Final
3	(Chinese Taipei) Fang Chieh-Min (Chinese Taipei) Lee Sheng-Mu	16	15
6	(Indonesia) Markis Kido (Indonesia) Hendra Setiawan	21	21

=== Top half ===
==== Section 1 ====
First Round
PFQ	(Australia) R Darmawan (Australia) B Halim	11	7
(Australia) W Caulkett (Australia) R Tam	21	21
(Malaysia) Hoon TH (Malaysia) Teo KS	21	21
(Indonesia) Y Sugiarto (Indonesia) A Wirawan	19	15
7	(Japan) H Endo (Japan) K Hayakawa	21	21
PFQ	(Australia) N Oon (Malaysia) Z Zainudin	8	10
PFQ	(China) Li G (China) Liu C	20	19
(Singapore) D Chrisnanta (Singapore) C Triyachart	22	21

Second Round
(Australia) W Caulkett (Australia) R Tam	17	17
(Malaysia) Hoon TH (Malaysia) Teo KS	21	21
7	(Japan) H Endo (Japan) K Hayakawa	21	16	21
(Singapore) D Chrisnanta (Singapore) C Triyachart	18	21	10

Quarterfinals
(Malaysia) Hoon TH (Malaysia) Teo KS	21	11	16
7	(Japan) H Endo (Japan) K Hayakawa	19	21	21

==== Section 2 ====
First Round
3	(Chinese Taipei) Fang C-M (Chinese Taipei) Lee S-M	21	21
PFQ	(Australia) A Joe (Australia) P S Low	10	8
(Malaysia) Goh VS (Malaysia) Lim KW	21	21
(Australia) N David (Australia) J Findlay	15	10
5	(Japan) N Kawamae (Japan) S Sato	21	21
PFQ	(Australia) T Pham (Australia) G Sam	6	6
(South Korea) Cho G-W (South Korea) Kang J-W	21	21
(Malaysia) Chan PS (Malaysia) Ong JG	18	18

Second Round
3	(Chinese Taipei) Fang C-M (Chinese Taipei) Lee S-M	21	10	21
(Malaysia) Goh VS (Malaysia) Lim KW	17	21	18
5	(Japan) N Kawamae (Japan) S Sato	21	21
(South Korea) Cho G-W (South Korea) Kang J-W	14	15

Quarterfinals
3	(Chinese Taipei) Fang C-M (Chinese Taipei) Lee S-M	17	21	21
5	(Japan) N Kawamae (Japan) S Sato	21	12	14

=== Bottom half ===
==== Section 3 ====
First Round
(Thailand) P Chalardchaleam (Thailand) N Puangpuapech	21	21
(Vietnam) Bui BD (Vietnam) Dao MT	16	17
(Australia) M Tin (Australia) T Trinh	6	10
6	(Indonesia) M Kido (Indonesia) H Setiawan	21	21
(Chinese Taipei) Chen H-L (Chinese Taipei) Lin Y-L	21	21
PFQ	(Australia) H Buendia (Australia) M Wheller	12	8
Q4	(Australia) A Chang (Australia) N Ong	8	6
4	(Indonesia) A Yulianto (Indonesia) H Gunawan	21	21

Second Round
(Thailand) P Chalardchaleam (Thailand) N Puangpuapech	23	15	12
6	(Indonesia) M Kido (Indonesia) H Setiawan	21	21	21
(Chinese Taipei) Chen H-L (Chinese Taipei) Lin Y-L	14	9
4	(Indonesia) A Yulianto (Indonesia) H Gunawan	21	21

Quarterfinals
6	(Indonesia) M Kido (Indonesia) H Setiawan	21	21
4	(Indonesia) A Yulianto (Indonesia) H Gunawan	15	15

==== Section 4 ====
First Round
(Malaysia) Z Abdul Latif (Malaysia) F Tazari	21	20	21
(India) R Kumar (India) S Thomas	19	22	17
(Australia) R Smith (Australia) G Warfe	20	16
8	(Indonesia) A Pratama (Indonesia) R Saputro	22	21
Q1	(Australia) Ko TF (Australia) M Lim	8	9
(Australia) M Fariman (Australia) Pham TH	21	21
Q3	(Australia) H Darmawan (Australia) B Koentjoro	8	10
2	(Japan) H Hashimoto (Japan) N Hirata	21	21

Second Round
(Malaysia) Z Abdul Latif (Malaysia) F Tazari	12	16
8	(Indonesia) A Pratama (Indonesia) R Saputro	21	21
(Australia) M Fariman (Australia) Pham TH	10	9
2	(Japan) H Hashimoto (Japan) N Hirata	21	21

Quarterfinals
8	(Indonesia) A Pratama (Indonesia) R Saputro	19	21	21
2	(Japan) H Hashimoto (Japan) N Hirata	21	17	19

== Women's doubles ==
=== Seeds ===
1. (Japan) Miyuki Maeda / Satoko Suetsuna (semi-final)
2. (Japan) Shizuka Matsuo / Mami Naito (semi-final)
3. (South Korea) Jung Kyung-Eun / Kim Ha-Na (second round)
4. (Indonesia) Greysia Polii / Meiliana Jauhari (second round)

=== Finals ===
Semifinals
1	(Japan) Miyuki Maeda (Japan) Satoko Suetsuna	19	19
(Chinese Taipei) Cheng Wen-Hsing (Chinese Taipei) Chien Yu-Chin	21	21
(China) Luo Ying (China) Luo Yu	21	21
2	(Japan) Shizuka Matsuo (Japan) Mami Naito	16	15

Final
(Chinese Taipei) Cheng Wen-Hsing (Chinese Taipei) Chien Yu-Chin	21	18	17
(China) Luo Ying (China) Luo Yu	12	21	21

=== Top half ===
==== Section 1 ====
First Round
1	(Japan) M Maeda (Japan) S Suetsuna
BYE
(Thailand) D Aroonkesorn (Thailand) K Voravichitchaikul	21	21
(Australia) Huang LL (Australia) I Meidiwinata	3	3
(Australia) W Chen (Australia) Hsieh C-J	12	10
(Indonesia) V Marissa (Indonesia) N Melati	21	21
(Australia) E Kwok (Australia) S Wang
(India) J Gutta (India) A Ponnappa	wo

Second Round
1	(Japan) M Maeda (Japan) S Suetsuna	21	21
(Thailand) D Aroonkesorn (Thailand) K Voravichitchaikul	16	6
(Indonesia) V Marissa (Indonesia) N Melati	21	21
(Australia) E Kwok (Australia) S Wang	10	3

Quarterfinals
1	(Japan) M Maeda (Japan) S Suetsuna	15	21	21
(Indonesia) V Marissa (Indonesia) N Melati	21	15	10

==== Section 2 ====
First Round
3	(South Korea) Jung K-E (South Korea) Kim H-N	21	21
(Australia) L Choo (Australia) R Veeran	15	8
(Australia) Huang S (Australia) Tang HT	8	16
(Chinese Taipei) Cheng W-H (Chinese Taipei) Chien Y-C	21	21
(China) Bao YX (China) Deng YT	21	16	12
(Malaysia) Wong PT (Malaysia) Chin EH	16	21	21
(Singapore) S Sari (Singapore) Yao L	18	19
(Indonesia) S Andini (Indonesia) D Haris	21	21

Second Round
3	(South Korea) Jung K-E (South Korea) Kim H-N	21	14	21
(Chinese Taipei) Cheng W-H (Chinese Taipei) Chien Y-C	14	21	23
(Malaysia) Wong PT (Malaysia) Chin EH	19	21	21
(Indonesia) S Andini (Indonesia) D Haris	21	13	19

Quarterfinals
(Chinese Taipei) Cheng W-H (Chinese Taipei) Chien Y-C	17	21	24
(Malaysia) Wong PT (Malaysia) Chin EH	21	18	22

=== Bottom half ===
==== Section 3 ====
First Round
(India) P Gadre (India) P Sawant	wo
(Australia) J Guan (Australia) G Somerville
(South Korea) Choi H-I (South Korea) Kim S-Y	10	11
(Indonesia) A Agustin (Indonesia) N Maheswari	21	21
(China) Luo Y (China) Luo Y	21	21
(New Zealand) A Brown (New Zealand) K Gregory	7	7
(Hong Kong) Poon LY (Hong Kong) Tse YS	12	11
4	(Indonesia) G Polii (Indonesia) M Jauhari	21	21

Second Round
(Australia) J Guan (Australia) G Somerville	14	11
(Indonesia) A Agustin (Indonesia) N Maheswari	21	21
(China) Luo Y (China) Luo Y	15	21	22
4	(Indonesia) G Polii (Indonesia) M Jauhari	21	15	20

Quarterfinals
(Indonesia) A Agustin (Indonesia) N Maheswari	10	20
(China) Luo Y (China) Luo Y	21	22

==== Section 4 ====
First Round
(Australia) Chong VV (Malaysia) J Wong	wo
(Malaysia) V Hoo (Malaysia) Woon KW
(Malaysia) Goh LY (Malaysia) Lom YL	17	18
(Japan) M Matsutomo (Japan) A Takahashi	21	21
(Thailand) S Amitrapai (Thailand) N Jindapon	21	21
(Australia) T Pilven (New Zealand) M Stapleton	6	6
BYE
2	(Japan) S Matsuo (Japan) M Naito

Second Round
(Malaysia) V Hoo (Malaysia) Woon KW	15	11
(Japan) M Matsutomo (Japan) A Takahashi	21	21
(Thailand) S Amitrapai (Thailand) N Jindapon	10	12
2	(Japan) S Matsuo (Japan) M Naito	21	21

Quarterfinals
(Japan) M Matsutomo (Japan) A Takahashi	7	9
2	(Japan) S Matsuo (Japan) M Naito	21	21

== Mixed doubles ==
=== Seeds ===
1. (Indonesia) Tontowi Ahmad / Lilyana Natsir (withdrew)
2. (Chinese Taipei) Chen Hung-Ling / Cheng Wen-Hsing (champion)
3. (Malaysia) Chan Peng Soon / Goh Liu Ying (final)
4. (Thailand) Sudket Prapakamol / Saralee Thoungthongkam (second round)
5. (Japan) Shintaro Ikeda / Reiko Shiota (semi-final)
6. (Indonesia) Muhammad Rijal / Debby Susanto (second round)
7. (Thailand) Songphon Anugritayawon / Kunchala Voravichitchaikul (withdrew)
8. (England) Chris Adcock / (Scotland) Imogen Bankier (withdrew)

=== Finals ===
Semifinals
5	(Japan) Shintaro Ikeda (Japan) Reiko Shiota	wo
3	(Malaysia) Chan Peng Soon (Malaysia) Goh Liu Ying
(Japan) Kenichi Hayakawa (Japan) Misaki Matsutomo	21	19	6
2	(Chinese Taipei) Chen Hung-Ling (Chinese Taipei) Cheng Wen-Hsing	18	21	21

Final
3	(Malaysia) Chan Peng Soon (Malaysia) Goh Liu Ying	20	21	21
2	(Chinese Taipei) Chen Hung-Ling (Chinese Taipei) Cheng Wen-Hsing	22	12	23

=== Top half ===
==== Section 1 ====
First Round
PFQ	(South Korea) Kang J-W (South Korea) Choi H-I	21	21
(Malaysia) Ong JG (Malaysia) Lim YL	18	19
(Singapore) C Triyachart (Singapore) Yao L	20	21	21
(Australia) R Tam (Australia) R Veeran	22	16	13
5	(Japan) S Ikeda (Japan) R Shiota	26	21
(Indonesia) F Kurniawan (Indonesia) S Irawati	24	16
PFQ	(South Korea) Cho G-W (South Korea) Kim S-Y	21	21
(Slovakia) M Matejka (Slovakia) M Fasungova	4	7

Second Round
PFQ	(South Korea) Kang J-W (South Korea) Choi H-I	21	21
(Singapore) C Triyachart (Singapore) Yao L	14	18
5	(Japan) S Ikeda (Japan) R Shiota	21	21
PFQ	(South Korea) Cho G-W (South Korea) Kim S-Y	15	15

Quarterfinals
PFQ	(South Korea) Kang J-W (South Korea) Choi H-I	15	20
5	(Japan) S Ikeda (Japan) R Shiota	21	22

==== Section 2 ====
First Round
3	(Malaysia) Chan PS (Malaysia) Goh LY	21	21
(Australia) G Warfe (Australia) L Choo	17	13
Q4	(Australia) J Findlay (Australia) T Pilven	12	4
(Hong Kong) Wong WH (Hong Kong) Chau HW	21	21
PFQ	(New Zealand) J Eunson (New Zealand) M Stapleton	13	12
(China) He HB (China) Bao YX	21	21
Q3	(Australia) W Caulkett (Australia) W Chen	18	21	21
PFQ	(New Zealand) M Phillips (New Zealand) A Rankin	21	5	5

Second Round
3	(Malaysia) Chan PS (Malaysia) Goh LY	18	21	21
(Hong Kong) Wong WH (Hong Kong) Chau HW	21	12	11
(China) He HB (China) Bao YX	21	21
Q3	(Australia) W Caulkett (Australia) W Chen	6	11

Quarterfinals
3	(Malaysia) Chan PS (Malaysia) Goh LY	21	21
(China) He HB (China) Bao YX	18	19

=== Bottom half ===
==== Section 3 ====
First Round
(Japan) K Hayakawa (Japan) M Matsutomo	21	21
PFQ	(Japan) H Endo (Japan) A Takahashi	10	14
(Malaysia) Tan AQ (Malaysia) Lai PJ	14	15
6	(Indonesia) M Rijal (Indonesia) D Susanto	21	21
Q1	(Australia) J Tan (Australia) T Saunders	8	16
PFQ	(China) Liu C (China) Luo Y	21	21
(Indonesia) H Setiawan (Indonesia) V Marissa	18	19
4	(Thailand) S Prapakamol (Thailand) S Thoungthongkam	21	21

Second Round
(Japan) K Hayakawa (Japan) M Matsutomo	21	21
6	(Indonesia) M Rijal (Indonesia) D Susanto	17	11
PFQ	(China) Liu C (China) Luo Y	9	21	21
4	(Thailand) S Prapakamol (Thailand) S Thoungthongkam	21	14	13

Quarterfinals
(Japan) K Hayakawa (Japan) M Matsutomo	21	22
PFQ	(China) Liu C (China) Luo Y	18	20

==== Section 4 ====
First Round
(Australia) L Chong (Australia) V Na	11	6
(Poland) R Mateusiak (Poland) N Zieba	21	21
(Singapore) D Chrisnanta (Singapore) V Neo	21	21
PFQ	(China) Li G (China) Luo Y	15	6
Q2	(Australia) R Smith (Australia) G Somerville	15	15
(Thailand) M Jongjit (Thailand) S Amitrapai	21	21
(Japan) S Sato (Japan) S Matsuo	23	13
2	(Chinese Taipei) Chen H-L (Chinese Taipei) Cheng W-H	25	21

Second Round
(Poland) R Mateusiak (Poland) N Zieba	21	21
(Singapore) D Chrisnanta (Singapore) V Neo	9	15
(Thailand) M Jongjit (Thailand) S Amitrapai	7	22	11
2	(Chinese Taipei) Chen H-L (Chinese Taipei) Cheng W-H	21	20	21

Quarterfinals
(Poland) R Mateusiak (Poland) N Zieba	16	19
2	(Chinese Taipei) Chen H-L (Chinese Taipei) Cheng W-H	21	21

Preceded by 2012 Swiss Open Grand Prix Gold	BWF Grand Prix Gold and Grand Prix; 2012 season	Succeeded by 2012 Malaysia Open Grand Prix Gold
