= 2014 Australian Super Series =

2014 Australia Super Series
Tournament details
- Dates: 24–29 June 2014
- Level: Super Series
- Total prize money: US$750,000
- Venue: States Sports Centre
- Location: Sydney, New South Wales, Australia

Champions
- Men's singles: (China) Lin Dan
- Women's singles: (India) Saina Nehwal
- Men's doubles: (South Korea) Lee Yong-dae (South Korea) Yoo Yeon-seong
- Women's doubles: (China) Tian Qing (China) Zhao Yunlei
- Mixed doubles: (South Korea) Ko Sung-hyun (South Korea) Kim Ha-na

The 2014 Australia Super Series was the eighth Super Series tournament of the 2014 BWF Super Series in badminton. The tournament was held in Sydney, Australia from 24 to 29 June 2014 with a total purse of $750,000.

== Players by nation ==
Nation	First round	Second round	Quarterfinals	Semifinals	Final
(Australia)	13	3			
(Malaysia)	8	2	2	1	
(Japan)	7	7	3	1	1
(India)	6	2	1	1	1
(Indonesia)	6	2		2	1
(Thailand)	6	1		1	
(Singapore)	4	2			
(United States)	4				
(Hong Kong)	3	3	2		
(Germany)	3	1			1
(Denmark)	3			1	
(China)	2	2	5	3	
(South Korea)	2	5	5	1	
(Philippines)	2				
(Chinese Taipei)	1	3	1		1
(Sweden)	1				
(Israel)	1				
(Austria)	1				
(Netherlands)	1				
(France)		1			
(Scotland)		1			
(Spain)				1	

== Representatives by nation ==
Top Nations
Rank	Nation	MS	WS	MD	WD	XD	Total
1	Japan	5	5	3	4	2	19
2	Australia	1	6	3.5	5	1	16.5
3	South Korea	2	2	3	4	4	15
4	Malaysia	4	0	4	3	2	13
4	China	3	2	3	3	2	13
6	India	2	3	3	1	3	12
7	Indonesia	2	2	2	1	4	11
8	Thailand	1	3	1	1	3	9
9	Singapore	1	0	1	2	3	7
10	Chinese Taipei	2	1	1	1	1	6
10	Hong Kong	1	0	1	2	2	6
12	Germany	1	0	1	1	2	5
13	Denmark	2	0	0	1	1	4
13	United States	1	1	1	0	1	4
15	Philippines	0	0	2	0	0	2
16	Sweden	1	0	0	0	0	1
16	Israel	1	0	0	0	0	1
16	Austria	1	0	0	0	0	1
16	France	1	0	0	0	0	1
16	Netherlands	0	0	1	0	0	1
16	Scotland	0	0	0	0	1	1

== Men's singles ==
=== Seeds ===
1. (Denmark) Jan Ø. Jørgensen
2. (Japan) Kenichi Tago
3. (Indonesia) Tommy Sugiarto (semifinals)
4. (South Korea) Shon Wan-ho (quarterfinals)
5. (Thailand) Boonsak Ponsana (first round)
6. (China) Wang Zhengming (quarterfinals)
7. (Japan) Kento Momota (quarterfinals)
8. (Germany) Marc Zwiebler (second round)

=== Top half ===
First Round
PFQ	(Malaysia) Liew DR	21	21	15
(Japan) T Ueda	9	23	21
(Singapore) D Wong	19	12
(China) Tian HW	21	21
6	(China) Wang ZM	21	21
(Sweden) H Hurskainen	19	19
Q1	(Australia) H K Oon	7	11
(India) B Sai Praneeth	21	21
4	(South Korea) Son W-h	21	19	21
(Denmark) V Axelsen	14	21	15
Q4	(Malaysia) Chiang J S	15	21	15
(Chinese Taipei) Hsu J-h	21	15	21
5	(Thailand) B Ponsana	21	17	16
(Hong Kong) Wei N	13	21	21
(China) Lin D	21	21
(Israel) M Zilberman	13	4

Second Round
(Japan) T Ueda	10	21	17
(China) Tian HW	21	18	21
(China) Wang ZM	21	8	21
(India) B Sai Praneeth	15	21	19
4	(South Korea) Son W-h	21	21
(Chinese Taipei) Hsu J-h	10	16
(Hong Kong) Wei N	15	15
(China) Lin D	21	21

Quarterfinals
(China) Tian HW	25	21
(China) Wang ZM	23	16
4	(South Korea) Son W-h	17	10
(China) Lin D	21	21

Semifinals
(China) Tian HW	19	21
(China) Lin D	21	23

=== Bottom half ===
First Round
(Japan) S Sasaki	21	20	21
(Chinese Taipei) Chou T-c	18	22	16
(Denmark) H-K Vittinghus	19	12
7	(Japan) K Momota	21	21
Q3	(Japan) R Takeshita	10	13
(France) B Leverdez	21	21
Q2	(Malaysia) M A Abdul Latif	7	8
3	(Indonesia) T Sugiarto	21	21
(Malaysia) Z Zulkiffli	12	17
(Hong Kong) Wong W K	21	21
(India) Prannoy H. S.	14	18
8	(Germany) M Zwiebler	21	21
(Japan) K Sakai	12	17
(Indonesia) S Santoso	21	21
(South Korea) Lee D-k	21	21
PFQ	(United States) S Pongnairat	13	13

Second Round
(Japan) S Sasaki	15	21	12
7	(Japan) K Momota	21	19	21
(France) B Leverdez	16	14
3	(Indonesia) T Sugiarto	21	21
(Hong Kong) Wong W K	21	21
8	(Germany) M Zwiebler	18	18
(Indonesia) S Santoso	21	21
(South Korea) Lee D-k	18	16

Quarterfinals
7	(Japan) K Momota	18	7
3	(Indonesia) T Sugiarto	21	21
(Hong Kong) Wong W K	17	15
(Indonesia) S Santoso	21	21

Semifinals
3	(Indonesia) T Sugiarto	16	13
(Indonesia) S Santoso	21	21

=== Finals ===
Semifinals
(China) Tian Houwei	19	21
(China) Lin Dan	21	23
3	(Indonesia) Tommy Sugiarto	16	13
(Indonesia) Simon Santoso	21	21

Final
(China) Lin Dan	22	21	21
(Indonesia) Simon Santoso	24	16	7

== Women's singles ==
=== Seeds ===
1. (China) Wang Shixian (semifinals)
2. (Thailand) Ratchanok Intanon (second round)
3. (South Korea) Sung Ji-hyun (second round)
4. (South Korea) Bae Yeon-ju (second round)
5. (Chinese Taipei) Tai Tzu-ying (quarterfinals)
6. (India) Saina Nehwal (winner)
7. (Thailand) Porntip Buranaprasertsuk (first round)
8. (India) P. V. Sindhu (quarterfinals)

=== Top half ===
First Round
1	(China) Wang SX	21	21
(Indonesia) M Wiranto	11	11
(Australia) T Pilven	21	21
Q3	(Australia) Tiffany H	17	8
5	(Chinese Taipei) Tai T-y	22	21
(Japan) A Yamaguchi	20	15
Q2	(Australia) Jennifer T	13	9
PFQ	(Australia) V Kessler	21	21
4	(South Korea) Bae Y-j	21	21
PFQ	(Australia) J Lai	15	17
(Austria) S Prutsch	7	12
(Japan) E Hirose	21	21
6	(India) S Nehwal	22	21	21
(China) Sun Y	24	17	10
(India) P. C. Thulasi	21	21
(United States) J Subandhi	16	18

Second Round
1	(China) Wang SX	21	21
(Australia) T Pilven	7	13
5	(Chinese Taipei) Tai T-y	21	21
PFQ	(Australia) V Kessler	15	13
4	(South Korea) Bae Y-j	21	18	15
(Japan) E Hirose	18	21	21
6	(India) S Nehwal	21	21
(India) P. C. Thulasi	18	15

Quarterfinals
1	(China) Wang SX	21	21
5	(Chinese Taipei) Tai T-y	15	19
(Japan) E Hirose	18	9
6	(India) S Nehwal	21	21

Semifinals
1	(China) Wang SX	19	21	15
6	(India) S Nehwal	21	16	21

=== Bottom half ===
First Round
(Thailand) N Jindapol
PFQ	(Japan) A Ohori	16	14
8	(India) P. V. Sindhu	21	21
(Indonesia) A Firdasari	13	15
(Spain) C Marín	21	21
(Thailand) B Ongbamrungphan	11	^{r}
3	(South Korea) Sung J-h	21
(Japan) S Takahashi	21	21
8	(Hong Kong) Yip P Y	10	14
(Japan) Y Hashimoto	21	21
7	(Thailand) P Buranaprasertsuk	11	14
PFQ	(Australia) A Wu	5	8
(China) Han L	21	21
2	(Thailand) R Intanon

Second Round
(Thailand) N Jindapol	13	7
8	(India) P. V. Sindhu	21	21
(Spain) C Marín	21	21
3	(South Korea) Sung J-h	15	17
(Japan) S Takahashi	13	13
(Japan) Y Hashimoto	21	21
(China) Han L	21	21
2	(Thailand) R Intanon	14	19

Quarterfinals
8	(India) P. V. Sindhu	17	17
(Spain) C Marín	21	21
(Japan) Y Hashimoto	21	21
(China) Han L	18	18

Semifinals
(Spain) C Marín	21	21
(Japan) Y Hashimoto	17	16

=== Finals ===
Semifinals
1	(China) Wang Shixian	19	21	15
6	(India) Saina Nehwal	21	16	21
(Spain) Carolina Marín	21	21
(Japan) Yui Hashimoto	17	16

Final
6	(India) Saina Nehwal	21	21
(Spain) Carolina Marín	18	11

== Men's doubles ==
=== Seeds ===
1. (Indonesia) Mohammad Ahsan / Hendra Setiawan (withdrew)
2. (South Korea) Kim Gi-jung / Kim Sa-rang (semifinals)
3. (Chinese Taipei) Lee Sheng-mu / Tsai Chia-hsin (Runner Up)
4. (South Korea) Lee Yong-dae / Yoo Yeon-seong (winner)
5. (China) Liu Xiaolong / Qiu Zihan (quarterfinals)
6. (Indonesia) Marcus Fernaldi Gideon / Markis Kido (second round)
7. (China) Fu Haifeng / Zhang Nan (second round)
8. (Japan) Takeshi Kamura / Keigo Sonoda (first round)

=== Top half ===
First Round
PFQ	(Philippines) P J Escueta (Philippines) R Estanislao	19	15
Q4	(Malaysia) Lim K W (Malaysia) Ow Y H	21	21
(Australia) R Tam (Australia) G Warfe	15	15
(Malaysia) Hoon T H (Malaysia) Tan B H	21	21
7	(China) Fu HF (China) Zhang N	21	21
(India) M Attri (India) B Sumeeth Reddy	17	11
(Germany) M Fuchs (Germany) J Schöttler	7	15
(China) Cai Y (China) Lu K	21	21
4'	(South Korea) Lee Y-d (South Korea) Yoo Y-s	21	21
(Hong Kong) Chan Y L (Hong Kong) Lee C H	17	19
(Japan) H Hashimoto (Japan) N Hirata	21	14	21
(Singapore) D B Chrisnanta (Singapore) C Triyachart	17	21	14
6	(Indonesia) M F Gideon (Indonesia) M Kido	21	21
(United States) P Chew (United States) S Pongnairat	15	18
(Malaysia) Goh V S (Malaysia) Tan W K	21	21
(Philippines) P G Magnaye (Philippines) P J Vivas	12	9

Second Round
Q4	(Malaysia) Lim K W (Malaysia) Ow Y H	18	14
(Malaysia) Hoon T H (Malaysia) Tan B H	21	21
7	(China) Fu HF (China) Zhang N	21	20	19
(China) Cai Y (China) Lu K	19	22	21
4	(South Korea) Lee Y-d (South Korea) Yoo Y-s	21	20	21
(Japan) H Hashimoto (Japan) N Hirata	18	22	12
6	(Indonesia) M F Gideon (Indonesia) M Kido	21	11	13
(Malaysia) Goh V S (Malaysia) Tan W K	19	21	21

Quarterfinals
(Malaysia) Hoon T H (Malaysia) Tan B H	23	21
(China) Cai Y (China) Lu K	21	16
4	(South Korea) Lee Y-d (South Korea) Yoo Y-s	21	24
(Malaysia) Goh V S (Malaysia) Tan W K	15	22

Semifinals
(Malaysia) Hoon T H (Malaysia) Tan B H	14	16
4	(South Korea) Lee Y-d (South Korea) Yoo Y-s	21	21

=== Bottom half ===
First Round
Q2	(Malaysia) Chan K B (Malaysia) Chiang J S
Q1
(Netherlands) R Bosch (Netherlands) K Ridder	9	19
5	(China) Liu XL (China) Qiu ZH	21	21
Q3	(Australia) Michael Fariman (Indonesia) M T Reyhan	7	11
(India) A Francis (India) A Vishnu	21	21
(Australia) R Middleton (Australia) R Smith	16	^{r}
3	(Chinese Taipei) Lee S-m (Chinese Taipei) Tsai C-h	21
(India) P Chopra (India) A Dewalker	21	21
(Singapore) T Hee (Singapore) D Wong	16	16
(South Korea) Ko S-h (South Korea) Shin B-c	21	21
8	(Japan) T Kamura (Japan) K Sonoda	13	16
(Japan) K Kazuno (Japan) K Yamada	22	21
(Indonesia) A Pratama (Indonesia) R A Saputro	20	17
(Thailand) M Jongjit (Thailand) N Phuangphuapet	14	21	19
2	(South Korea) Kim G-j (South Korea) Kim S-r	21	13	21

Second Round
Q2	(Malaysia) Chan K B (Malaysia) Chiang J S	9	10
5	(China) Liu XL (China) Qiu ZH	21	21
(India) A Francis (India) A Vishnu	18	9
3	(Chinese Taipei) Lee S-m (Chinese Taipei) Tsai C-h	21	21
(India) P Chopra (India) A Dewalker	13	19
(South Korea) Ko S-h (South Korea) Shin B-c	21	21
(Japan) K Kazuno (Japan) K Yamada	20	17
2	(South Korea) Kim G-j (South Korea) Kim S-r	22	21

Quarterfinals
5	(China) Liu XL (China) Qiu ZH	21	10
3	(Chinese Taipei) Lee S-m (Chinese Taipei) Tsai C-h	23	21
(South Korea) Ko S-h (South Korea) Shin B-c	13	13
2	(South Korea) Kim G-j (South Korea) Kim S-r	21	21

Semifinals
3	(Chinese Taipei) Lee S-m (Chinese Taipei) Tsai C-h	21	21
2	(South Korea) Kim G-j (South Korea) Kim S-r	18	17

=== Finals ===
Semifinals
(Malaysia) Hoon Thein How (Malaysia) Tan Boon Heong	14	16
4	(South Korea) Lee Yong-dae (South Korea) Yoo Yeon-seong	21	21
3	(Chinese Taipei) Lee Sheng-mu (Chinese Taipei) Tsai Chia-hsin	21	21
2	(South Korea) Kim Gi-jung (South Korea) Kim Sa-rang	18	17

Final
4	(South Korea) Lee Yong-dae (South Korea) Yoo Yeon-seong	21	21
3	(Chinese Taipei) Lee Sheng-mu (Chinese Taipei) Tsai Chia-hsin	14	18

== Women's doubles ==
=== Seeds ===
1. (Denmark) Kamilla Rytter Juhl / Christinna Pedersen (semifinals)
2. (Japan) Misaki Matsutomo / Ayaka Takahashi (finalists)
3. (South Korea) Chang Ye-na / Kim So-young (second round)
4. (Japan) Reika Kakiiwa / Miyuki Maeda (second round)
5. (China) Tian Qing / Zhao Yunlei (winner)
6. (China) Luo Ying / Luo Yu (semifinals)
7. (South Korea) Jung Kyung-eun / Kim Ha-na (quarterfinals)
8. (Indonesia) Pia Zebadiah Bernadet / Rizki Amelia Pradipta (second round)

=== Top half ===
First Round
(Australia) J Guan (Australia) G Somerville	17	15
(Chinese Taipei) Cheng W-h (Chinese Taipei) Hsieh P-c	21	21
7	(South Korea) Jung K-e (South Korea) Kim H-n	21	21
(Australia) T Ho (Australia) E Y-M Kwok	4	9
(Singapore) Fu MT (Singapore) Neo V Y Y	13	19
(Hong Kong) Chan T K (Hong Kong) Tse Y S	21	21
(South Korea) Lee S-h (South Korea) Shin S-c
WDN	(Malaysia) Ng H E (Malaysia) Ng H L
5	(China) Tian Q (China) Zhao YL
WDN	(Malaysia) V Hoo (Malaysia) Woon K W
(Australia) V Kessler (Australia) J Lai	6	4
(South Korea) Go A-r (South Korea) Yoo H-w	21	21

Second Round
1	(Denmark) K Rytter Juhl (Denmark) C Pedersen	22	21
(Chinese Taipei) Cheng W-h (Chinese Taipei) Hsieh P-c	20	12
7	(South Korea) Jung K-e (South Korea) Kim H-n	21	21
(Hong Kong) Chan T K (Hong Kong) Tse Y S	10	17
3	(South Korea) Chang Y-n (South Korea) Kim S-y	20	21	12
(South Korea) Lee S-h (South Korea) Shin S-c	22	19	21
5	(China) Tian Q (China) Zhao YL	21	19	21
(South Korea) Go A-r (South Korea) Yoo H-w	9	21	18

Quarterfinals
1	(Denmark) K Rytter Juhl (Denmark) C Pedersen	21	21
7	(South Korea) Jung K-e (South Korea) Kim H-n	9	9
(South Korea) Lee S-h (South Korea) Shin S-c	21	17	19
5	(China) Tian Q (China) Zhao YL	8	21	21

Semifinals
1	(Denmark) K Rytter Juhl (Denmark) C Pedersen	21	20	20
5	(China) Tian Q (China) Zhao YL	11	22	22

=== Bottom half ===
First Round
(Singapore) S M Sari (Singapore) Yao L	21	21
(Germany) I Herttrich (Germany) B Michels	17	8
(Australia) Tang H T (Australia) R Veeran	15	21	13
6	(China) Luo Y (China) Luo Y	21	15	21
(Japan) S Matsuo (Japan) M Naito	21	21
(China) Huang YQ (China) Yu XH	16	17
(Australia) J Tam (Australia) A Wu	11	14
4	(Japan) R Kakiiwa (Japan) M Maeda	21	21
(Thailand) P Supajirakul (Thailand) S Taerattanachai	22	17
(Hong Kong) Chau H W (Hong Kong) Poon L Y	24	21
(India) P Gadre (India) N. Sikki Reddy	17	21	10
8	(Indonesia) P Z Bernadet (Indonesia) R A Pradipta	21	19	21
(Malaysia) A A Anscelly (Malaysia) Soong F C	7	16
(Japan) A Kugo (Japan) Y Miyauchi	21	21

Second Round
(Singapore) S M Sari (Singapore) Yao L	5	11
6	(China) Luo Y (China) Luo Y	21	21
(Japan) S Matsuo (Japan) M Naito	19	21	21
4	(Japan) R Kakiiwa (Japan) M Maeda	21	17	14
(Hong Kong) Chau H W (Hong Kong) Poon L Y	21	24
8	(Indonesia) P Z Bernadet (Indonesia) R A Pradipta	12	22
(Japan) A Kugo (Japan) Y Miyauchi	21	14	9
2	(Japan) M Matsutomo (Japan) A Takahashi	17	21	21

Quarterfinals
6	(China) Luo Y (China) Luo Y	21	21
(Japan) S Matsuo (Japan) M Naito	7	19
(Hong Kong) Chau H W (Hong Kong) Poon L Y	5	8
2	(Japan) M Matsutomo (Japan) A Takahashi	21	21

Semifinals
6	(China) Luo Y (China) Luo Y	16	15
2	(Japan) M Matsutomo (Japan) A Takahashi	21	21

=== Finals ===
Semifinals
1	(Denmark) Kamilla Rytter Juhl (Denmark) Christinna Pedersen	21	20	20
5	(China) Tian Qing (China) Zhao Yunlei	11	22	22
6	(China) Luo Yu (China) Luo Ying	16	15
2	(Japan) Misaki Matsutomo (Japan) Ayaka Takahashi	21	21

Final
5	(China) Tian Qing (China) Zhao Yunlei	21	21
2	(Japan) Misaki Matsutomo (Japan) Ayaka Takahashi	15	9

== Mixed doubles ==
=== Seeds ===
1. (Indonesia) Tontowi Ahmad / Liliyana Natsir (withdrew)
2. (China) Xu Chen / Ma Jin (quarterfinals)
3. (Denmark) Joachim Fischer Nielsen / Christinna Pedersen (first round)
4. (Indonesia) Markis Kido / Pia Zebadiah Bernadet (semifinals)
5. (Thailand) Sudket Prapakamol / Saralee Thungthongkam (semifinals)
6. (South Korea) Ko Sung-hyun / Kim Ha-na (winner)
7. (Hong Kong) Lee Chun Hei / Chau Hoi Wah (first round)
8. (South Korea) Shin Baek-cheol / Chang Ye-na (first round)

=== Top half ===
First Round
1	(Indonesia) T Ahmad (Indonesia) L Natsir
(United States) P Chew (United States) J Subandhi	w	/	o
Q3	(Japan) K Kazuno (Japan) Y Miyauchi	17	10
(Malaysia) Chan P S (Malaysia) Lai P J	21	21
5	(Thailand) S Prapakamol (Thailand) S Thungthongkam	21	10	21
(Singapore) T Hee (Singapore) Fu MT	12	21	9
(Indonesia) M F Gideon (Indonesia) R A Pradipta	19	23	17
(China) Lu K (China) Huang YQ	21	21	21
3	(Denmark) J Fischer Nielsen (Denmark) C Pedersen	15	21	17
(Germany) M Fuchs (Germany) B Michels	21	14	21
(Hong Kong) Chan Y L (Hong Kong) Tse Y S	21	21
Q2	(India) A Dewalkar (India) P Gadre	16	14
7	(Hong Kong) Lee C H (Hong Kong) Chau H W	21	17
(Singapore) C Triyachart (Singapore) Yao L	23	21
(Thailand) M Jongjit (Thailand) S Taerattanachai	13	15
(South Korea) Lee Y-d (South Korea) Shin S-c	21	21

Second Round
(United States) P Chew (United States) J Subandhi	17	11
Q3	(Malaysia) Chan P S (Malaysia) Lai P J	21	21
5	(Thailand) S Prapakamol (Thailand) S Thungthongkam	21	20	21
(China) Lu K (China) Huang YQ	18	22	19
(Germany) M Fuchs (Germany) B Michels	21	21
(Hong Kong) Chan Y L (Hong Kong) Tse Y S	17	17
(Singapore) C Triyachart (Singapore) Yao L	16	15
(South Korea) Lee Y-d (South Korea) Shin S-c	21	21

Quarterfinals
Q3	(Malaysia) Chan P S (Malaysia) Lai P J	11	15
5	(Thailand) S Prapakamol (Thailand) S Thungthongkam	21	21
(Germany) M Fuchs (Germany) B Michels	21	21
(South Korea) Lee Y-d (South Korea) Shin S-c	18	9

Semifinals
5	(Thailand) S Prapakamol (Thailand) S Thungthongkam	17	12
(Germany) M Fuchs (Germany) B Michels	21	21

=== Bottom half ===
First Round
(India) A Vishnu (India) A Balan	21	22	22
(Australia) R Smith (Australia) R Veeran	23	20	24
(Singapore) D B Chrisnanta (Singapore) V Neo	24	22
8	(South Korea) Shin B-c (South Korea) Chang Y-n	22	20
(South Korea) Kim G-j (South Korea) Kim S-y	22	13
(Indonesia) R Widianto (Indonesia) R P Dili	24	21
(Germany) P Käsbauer (Germany) I Herttrich	16	19
4	(Indonesia) M Kido (Indonesia) P Z Bernadet	21	21
(Chinese Taipei) Chen H-l (Chinese Taipei) Cheng W-h	19	21	21
(Japan) H Hashimoto (Japan) M Maeda	21	12	13
Q1	(Thailand) N Phuangphuapet (Thailand) P Supajirakul	16	9
6	(South Korea) Ko S-h (South Korea) Kim H-n	21	21
(Scotland) R Blair (Scotland) I Bankier	21	21
(Malaysia) M L Z A Khalid (Malaysia) Soong F C	14	11
Q4	(India) M Attri (India) N. Sikki Reddy	17	16
2	(China) Xu C (China) Ma J	21	21

Second Round
(Australia) R Smith (Australia) R Veeran	17	9
(Singapore) D B Chrisnanta (Singapore) V Neo	21	21
(Indonesia) R Widianto (Indonesia) R P Dili	13	21	16
4	(Indonesia) M Kido (Indonesia) P Z Bernadet	21	14	21
(Chinese Taipei) Chen H-l (Chinese Taipei) Cheng W-h	17	21	11
6	(South Korea) Ko S-h (South Korea) Kim H-n	21	19	21
(Scotland) R Blair (Scotland) I Bankier	14	21	13
2	(China) Xu C (China) Ma J	21	10	21

Quarterfinals
(Singapore) D B Chrisnanta (Singapore) V Neo	21	11	17
4	(Indonesia) M Kido (Indonesia) P Z Bernadet	16	21	21
6	(South Korea) Ko S-h (South Korea) Kim H-n	21	21
2	(China) Xu C (China) Ma J	15	15

Semifinals
4	(Indonesia) M Kido (Indonesia) P Z Bernadet	12	21	12
6	(South Korea) Ko S-h (South Korea) Kim H-n	21	19	21

=== Finals ===
Semifinals
5	(Thailand) Sudket Prapakamol (Thailand) Saralee Thungthongkam	17	12
(Germany) Michael Fuchs (Germany) Birgit Michels	21	21
4	(Indonesia) Markis Kido (Indonesia) Pia Zebadiah Bernadet	12	21	12
6	(South Korea) Ko Sung-hyun (South Korea) Kim Ha-na	21	19	21

Final
(Germany) Michael Fuchs (Germany) Birgit Michels	16	17
6	(South Korea) Ko Sung-hyun (South Korea) Kim Ha-na	21	21
