= 2012 Oceania Badminton Championships =

Tournament details
- Dates: 22-25 February 2012
- Venue: Ken Kay Badminton Stadium
- Location: Ballarat, Australia

The 2012 Badminton Oceania Championships was the 8th tournament of the Oceania Badminton Championships. It was held in Ballarat, Australia from February 22 to February 25, 2012.

== Medalists ==
=== Individual Event ===
Event	Gold	Silver	Bronze
Men's singles	(New Zealand) James Eunson	(New Zealand) Michael Fowke	(Australia) Luke Chong
Men's singles	(New Zealand) James Eunson	(New Zealand) Michael Fowke	(New Zealand) Luke Charlesworth
Women's singles	(New Zealand) Michelle Chan Ky	(Australia) Verdet Kessler	(New Zealand) Anna Rankin
Women's singles	(New Zealand) Michelle Chan Ky	(Australia) Verdet Kessler	(Australia) Victoria Na
Men's doubles	(Australia) Ross Smith (Australia) Glenn Warfe	(New Zealand) Kevin Dennerly-Minturn (New Zealand) Oliver Leydon-Davis	(New Zealand) Maika Phillips (New Zealand) Elliot Pike
Men's doubles	(Australia) Ross Smith (Australia) Glenn Warfe	(New Zealand) Kevin Dennerly-Minturn (New Zealand) Oliver Leydon-Davis	(Australia) Nathan David (Australia) Joel Findlay
Women's doubles	(Australia) Leanne Choo (Australia) Renuga Veeran	(Australia) Ann-Louise Slee (Australia) Eugenia Tanaka	(Australia) Vinning Mak (Australia) Natasha Sharp
Women's doubles	(Australia) Leanne Choo (Australia) Renuga Veeran	(Australia) Ann-Louise Slee (Australia) Eugenia Tanaka	(Australia) Verdet Kessler (Australia) Talia Saunders
Mixed doubles	(Australia) Raymond Tam (Australia) Eugenia Tanaka	(Australia) Glenn Warfe (Australia) Leanne Choo	(Australia) Ross Smith (Australia) Gronya Somerville
Mixed doubles	(Australia) Raymond Tam (Australia) Eugenia Tanaka	(Australia) Glenn Warfe (Australia) Leanne Choo	(Australia) Luke Chong (Australia) Victoria Na

=== Team Event ===
Event	Gold	Silver	Bronze
Mixed Team	Australia; Wesley Caulkett, Luke Chong, Stuart Gomez, Ben McCarthy, Ross Smith, Raymond Tam, Jeff Tho, Glenn Warfe, Leanne Choo, Jacqueline Guan, Verder Kessler, Victoria Na, Tara Pilven, Gronya Somerville, Eugenia Tanaka, Tang He Tian, Renuga Veeran	New Zealand 1 Luke Charlesworth, Kevin Dennerly-Minturn, James Eunson, Oliver Leydon-Davis, Amanda Brown, Michelle Chan Ky, Stephanie Cheng, Anna Rankin	New Zealand 2 Michael Fowke, Brock Matheson, Maika Phillips, Elliot Pike, Victoria Cheng, Kritteka Gregory, Aishwarya Nair
Men's team	New Zealand; Luke Charlesworth, Kevin Dennerly-Minturn, James Eunson, Michael Fowke, Oliver Leydon-Davis	Australia; Wesley Caulkett, Luke Chong, Stuart Gomez, Ben McCarthy, Ross Smith, Raymond Tam, Jeff Tho, Glenn Warfe	New Caledonia; Fabien Kaddour, Mathieu Martaud, Loic Mennesson, Morgan Paitio, Joey Santino, Sandy Suarno
Women's team	Australia; Leanne Choo, Jacqueline Guan, Verder Kessler, Victoria Na, Tara Pilven, Gronya Somerville, Eugenia Tanaka, He Tian Tang, Renuga Veeran	New Zealand; Amanda Brown, Michelle Chan Ky, Stephanie Cheng, Anna Rankin	New Caledonia; Nadia Kasimun, Lorinda Sautes, Johanna Kou, Magali Bravo, Cecilia Mooussy

== Medal table ==
Rank	Nation	Gold	Silver	Bronze	Total
1	Australia (AUS)	4	3	7	14
2	New Zealand (NZL)	2	3	4	9
Totals (2 entries)		6	6	11	23
