= Victoria Na =

Australian badminton player

Personal information
- Born: 23 March 1991 (age 35) Carlton, Victoria, Australia
- Height: 1.67 m (5 ft 6 in)
- Weight: 60 kg (132 lb)

Sport
- Country: Australia
- Sport: Badminton
- Handedness: Right

Women's singles & mixed doubles
- Highest ranking: 71 (WS) 29 November 2012; 55 (XD) 31 January 2013
- BWF profile
Medal record
Badminton
Representing Australia
Oceania Championships
Bronze medal – third place	2012 Ballarat	Women's singles
Bronze medal – third place	2012 Ballarat	Mixed doubles

Victoria Na (born 23 March 1991) is an Australian badminton player. She is of Indonesian and Thai descent. She has won an Australian age national championship and participated in several international badminton competitions. Na made her Australian national badminton team debut in 2011 and was a member of the Australian 2012 Summer Olympics badminton team.

== Personal ==
Nicknamed Vicky, Na was born on 23 March 1991 in Carlton, Victoria and as of 2012 lives in Glen Waverley, Victoria. She is 1.67 m (5 ft 6 in) tall and weighs 60 kilograms (130 lb). She attended Mount View Primary School, and then went on to high school at Wesley College (Victoria). She then completed her final high school years at Haileybury Girls College. As of 2012 she is working on a Bachelor of Arts in Digital Arts at RMIT, starting her degree in 2009.

== Career ==
Na plays singles women's badminton for the Badminton Academy of Victoria, located in Kilsyth, Victoria. She started competing in the sport in 2000 as a nine-year-old, and has always been coached by her father Kobeng Na.

In 2005, Na won the Australian junior national championships in the under-15 singles class. In 2007, she won the under-17 singles class at the Australasian Junior Championships. In 2009, she won the under-19 singles class at the Australasian Junior Championships. She finished first at the 2011 Ethiopia International 2011 in Addis Ababa, Ethiopia in the singles competition. She finished second at the 2012 Thomas Cup Preliminaries — Oceania in Ballarat, Australia in the team event. She finished first at the 2012 Uber Cup Preliminaries — Oceania in Ballarat, Australia in the team event. At the 2012 Yonex Australian Open Grand Prix Gold in Sydney, Australia in the singles event, she finished seventeenth. At the 2012 Air Tahiti Nui International Challenge in Punaauia, French Polynesia she finished ninth in the singles event. At the 2012 Thomas & Uber Cup in Wuhan China, she finished 9th in the team competition. In June 2012, she was scheduled to participate in a badminton international event in Auckland, New Zealand ahead of the Olympics where she will have a bye in the first round. In round two, she will meet Ching Chieh Tai from Chinese Taipei.

=== National team ===
Na made her national team debut in 2011. At the 2012 Oceania Championships in Ballarat, Australia, she finished third in the singles event and first in the team event. In June 2012, she was named to Australia's badminton team for the 2012 Summer Olympics. The Games was her first Olympic appearance.

== Achievements ==
=== Oceania Championships ===
Women's Singles

Year	Venue	Opponent	Score	Result
2012	Ken Kay Badminton Stadium, Ballarat, Australia	(Australia) Verdet Kessler	17–21, 22–24	Bronze

Mixed Doubles

Year	Venue	Partner	Opponent	Score	Result
2012	Ken Kay Badminton Stadium, Ballarat, Australia	(Australia) Luke Chong	(Australia) Raymond Tam (Australia) Eugenia Tanaka	21–23, 18–21	Bronze

=== BWF International Challenge/Series ===
Women's Singles

Year	Tournament	Opponent	Score	Result
2011	Ethiopia International	(South Africa) Stacey Doubell	21–13, 15–21, 21–14	(gold) Winner
2011	Zimbabwe International	(Austria) Claudia Mayer	21–18, 17–21, 19–21	(silver) Runner-up
2011	Namibia International	(Austria) Claudia Mayer	25–27, 21–17, 21–17	(gold) Winner
2011	Counties Manukau International	(United States) Karyn Velez	12–21, 15–21	(silver) Runner-up
2011	Altona International	(United States) Karyn Velez	22–24, 17–21	(silver) Runner-up

Mixed Doubles

Year	Tournament	Partner	Opponent	Score	Result
2012	Auckland International	(Australia) Luke Chong	(England) Tom Armstrong (England) Tracey Hallam	11–21, 7–21	(silver) Runner-up
2011	Zimbabwe International	(Australia) Luke Chong	(Zimbabwe) Lawrence Mdege (Zimbabwe) Kudzai Panganai	21–3, 21–6	(gold) Winner
2011	Namibia International	(Australia) Luke Chong	(Egypt) Abdelrahman Kashkal (Egypt) Hadia Hosny	14–21, 21–16, 20–22	(silver) Runner-up

BWF International Challenge tournament
BWF International Series tournament
BWF Future Series tournament
