= Talia Saunders =

Australian badminton player (born 1986)

Personal information
- Born: Talia Jay Saunders; 24 October 1986 (age 40) Adelaide, Australia

Sport
- Country: Australia
- Sport: Badminton

Women's singles & doubles
- Highest ranking: 259 (WS 17 May 2012); 144 (WD 20 March 2014); 141 (XD 27 March 2014)
- BWF profile
Medal record
Women's badminton
Representing Australia
Oceania Championships
Silver medal – second place	2015 North Harbour	Women's doubles
Bronze medal – third place	2012 Ballarat	Women's doubles
Bronze medal – third place	2014 Ballarat	Women's doubles
Bronze medal – third place	2014 Ballarat	Mixed doubles
Bronze medal – third place	2015 North Harbour	Women's singles
Bronze medal – third place	2015 North Harbour	Mixed doubles
Bronze medal – third place	2019 Melbourne	Women's doubles

Talia Jay Saunders (born 24 October 1986) is an Australian badminton player. Saunders won the mixed doubles title at the Australian National Badminton Championships with three different partners in 2011, 2013, 2014 and 2015. At the Oceania Championships, she reach the semi-final round in the women's doubles event in 2012 and 2015; mixed doubles in 2014 and 2015; and in the women's singles in 2015. Her best achievement was when she reach the women's doubles final in 2015 and won a silver with Jennifer Tam.

== Achievements ==
=== Oceania Championships ===
Women's singles
Year	Venue	Opponent	Score	Result
2015	X-TRM North Harbour Badminton Centre; Auckland, New Zealand	(Australia) Joy Lai	14–21, 13–21	Bronze

Women's doubles
Year	Venue	Partner	Opponent	Score	Result
2019	Melbourne Sports and Aquatic Centre; Melbourne, Australia	(Australia) Jessica Lim	(Australia) Yingzi Jiang (Australia) Louisa Ma	23–21, 14–21, 18–21	Bronze
2015	X-TRM North Harbour Badminton Centre; Auckland, New Zealand	(Australia) Jennifer Tam	(Australia) Leanne Choo (Australia) Gronya Somerville	14–21, 11–21	Silver
2014	Ken Kay Badminton Hall; Ballarat, Australia	(Australia) Tara Pilven	(Australia) Jacqueline Guan (Australia) Gronya Somerville	16–21, 16–21	Bronze
2012	Ken Kay Badminton Hall; Ballarat, Australia	(Australia) Verdet Kessler	(Australia) Ann-Louise Slee (Australia) Eugenia Tanaka	11–21, 21–23	Bronze

Mixed doubles
Year	Venue	Partner	Opponent	Score	Result
2015	X-TRM North Harbour Badminton Centre; Auckland, New Zealand	(Australia) Michael Fariman	(Australia) Robin Middleton (Australia) Leanne Choo	13–21, 16–21	Bronze
2014	Ken Kay Badminton Hall; Ballarat, Australia	(Australia) Luke Chong	(Australia) Matthew Chau (Australia) Jacqueline Guan	16–21, 19–21	Bronze
