= Oceania Badminton Championships =

International badminton competition

The Oceania Badminton Championships is a tournament organized by the Badminton Oceania (BO) and is held once every two years to crown the best badminton players and teams in Oceania.

== Championships ==
This championship has been established since 1997, and was first held on the North Shore, Auckland, New Zealand, with individuals event only. The teams event started in 1999.

The table below gives an overview of all host cities and countries of the Oceania Championships.

Year	Number	Host city	Events
1997	1	North Shore, New Zealand	5
1999	2	Brisbane, Australia	6
2002	3	Suva, Fiji	6
2004	4	West Auckland, New Zealand	6
2006	5	Auckland, New Zealand	6
2008	6	Nouméa, New Caledonia	6
2010	7	Invercargill, New Zealand	6
2012	8	Ballarat, Australia	6
2014	9	Ballarat, Australia	6
2015	10	Auckland, New Zealand	5
2016	11	Punaauia, Tahiti	5
2017	12	Nouméa, New Caledonia	5
2018	13	Hamilton, New Zealand	7
2019	14	Melbourne, Australia	6
2020	15	Ballarat, Australia	7
2022	16	Melbourne, Australia	5
2023	17	Auckland, New Zealand	6
2024	18	Geelong, Australia	7
2025	19	Auckland, New Zealand	6
2026	20	Auckland, New Zealand	7

== Individual Event ==
=== Medal winners ===
==== Men's singles ====
Year	1st place, gold medalist(s)	2nd place, silver medalist(s)	3rd place, bronze medalist(s)	
1997	(New Zealand) Nick Hall	(New Zealand) Geoff Bellingham	(Australia) Stuart Brehaut	(New Zealand) Jarrod King
1999	(Australia) Rio Suryana	(New Zealand) Geoff Bellingham	(New Zealand) Nick Hall	(Australia) Murray Hocking
2002	(New Zealand) Geoff Bellingham	(New Zealand) Nick Hall	(Australia) Stuart Brehaut	(Australia) Nathan Malpass
2004	(Australia) Leonard Tjoe	(New Zealand) Geoff Bellingham	(Australia) Stuart Brehaut	(New Zealand) John Moody
2006	(New Zealand) Geoff Bellingham	(New Zealand) John Moody	(Australia) Stuart Brehaut	(Australia) Stuart Gomez
2008	(New Zealand) John Moody	(Australia) Stuart Gomez	(Australia) Jeff Tho	(Australia) Ben Walklate
2010	(New Zealand) Joe Wu	(New Zealand) James Eunson	Marc Antoine Desaymoz	(New Zealand) Michael Fowke
2012	(New Zealand) James Eunson	(New Zealand) Michael Fowke	(Australia) Luke Chong	(New Zealand) Luke Charlesworth
2014	(Australia) Jeff Tho	(Australia) Ashwant Gobinathan	(New Zealand) Joe Wu	(Australia) Luke Chong
2015	(Australia) Daniel Guda	(New Zealand) Luke Charlesworth	(Australia) Michael Fariman	(Australia) Ashwant Gobinathan
2016	(Australia) Ashwant Gobinathan	(French Polynesia) Rémi Rossi	(Australia) Anthony Joe	(Australia) Nathan Tang
2017	(Australia) Pit Seng Low	(New Zealand) Niccolo Tagle	(Australia) Daniel Fan	(Australia) Jacob Schueler
2018	(New Zealand) Abhinav Manota	(French Polynesia) Rémi Rossi	(Australia) Peter Yan	(New Zealand) Oscar Guo
2019	(New Zealand) Oscar Guo	(French Polynesia) Rémi Rossi	(New Zealand) Abhinav Manota	(Australia) Keith Mark Edison
2020	(New Zealand) Abhinav Manota	(New Zealand) Edward Lau	(Australia) Nathan Tang	(Australia) Milain Lohith Ranasinghe
2022	(New Zealand) Edward Lau	(Australia) Nathan Tang	(Australia) Lin Ying Xiang	(New Zealand) Oscar Guo
2023	(New Zealand) Abhinav Manota	(New Zealand) Edward Lau	(Australia) Jacob Schueler	(French Polynesia) Rémi Rossi
2024	(New Zealand) Edward Lau	(Australia) Shrey Dhand	(Australia) Ricky Tang	(Australia) Jacob Schueler
2025	(Australia) Jack Yu	(New Zealand) Edward Lau	(Australia) Shrey Dhand	(Australia) Ephraim Stephen Sam
2026	(Australia) Shrey Dhand	(New Zealand) Edward Lau	(New Zealand) Ricky Cheng	(Australia) Ephraim Stephen Sam

==== Women's singles ====
Year	1st place, gold medalist(s)	2nd place, silver medalist(s)	3rd place, bronze medalist(s)	
1997	(New Zealand) Li Feng	(New Zealand) Rhona Robertson	(New Zealand) Rebecca Gordon	(Australia) Rhonda Cator
1999	(New Zealand) Rhona Robertson	(Australia) Rayoni Head	(New Zealand) Rebecca Gordon	(New Zealand) Lianne Shirley
2002	(Australia) Lenny Permana	(New Zealand) Rebecca Gordon	(Australia) Kellie Lucas	(Australia) Rayoni Head
2004	(Australia) Lenny Permana	(New Zealand) Rebecca Gordon	(Australia) Kellie Lucas	(New Zealand) Rachel Hindley
2006	(New Zealand) Rachel Hindley	(New Zealand) Renee Flavell	(Australia) Tania Luiz	(New Zealand) Michelle Chan
2008	(New Zealand) Michelle Chan	(New Zealand) Rachel Hindley	(New Zealand) Jessica Jonggowisastro	(Australia) Leisha Cooper
2010	(Australia) Huang Chia-Chi	(Australia) Erica Pong	(New Zealand) Jessica Jonggowisastro	(Australia) Leanne Choo
2012	(New Zealand) Michelle Chan	(Australia) Verdet Kessler	(New Zealand) Anna Rankin	(Australia) Victoria Na
2014	(Australia) Verdet Kessler	(New Zealand) Michelle Chan	(Australia) Joy Lai	(Australia) Tara Pilven
2015	(Australia) Chen Hsuan-yu	(Australia) Joy Lai	(Australia) Talia Saunders	(Australia) Jennifer Tam
2016	(Australia) Chen Hsuan-yu	(Australia) Joy Lai	(Australia) Tiffany Ho	(Australia) Jennifer Tam
2017	(Australia) Chen Hsuan-yu	(Australia) Tiffany Ho	(Australia) Joy Lai	(Australia) Jennifer Tam
2018	(Australia) Chen Hsuan-yu	(Australia) Louisa Ma	(Australia) Joy Lai	(Australia) Zecily Fung
2019	(Australia) Chen Hsuan-yu	(Australia) Jiang Yingzi	(New Zealand) Sally Fu	(Australia) Louisa Ma
2020	(Australia) Chen Hsuan-yu	(Australia) Louisa Ma	(Australia) Sylvina Kurniawan	(Australia) Tiffany Ho
2022	(Australia) Chen Hsuan-yu	(Australia) Louisa Ma	(Australia) Sydney Tjonadi	(Australia) Tiffany Ho
2023	(New Zealand) Shaunna Li	(Australia) Tiffany Ho	(Australia) Bernice Teoh	(Australia) Louisa Ma
2024	(Australia) Tiffany Ho	(Australia) Zhang Yuelin	(New Zealand) Shaunna Li	(Australia) Sydney Go
2025	(New Zealand) Shaunna Li	(Australia) Tiffany Ho	(New Zealand) Jenny Zhu	(Australia) Victoria Tjonadi
2026	(New Zealand) Shaunna Li	(Australia) Tiffany Ho	(New Zealand) Amy Wang	(Australia) Jesslyn Carrisia

==== Men's doubles ====
Year	1st place, gold medalist(s)	2nd place, silver medalist(s)	3rd place, bronze medalist(s)	
1997	(Australia) Peter Blackburn (Australia) David Bamford	(New Zealand) Glenn Walker (New Zealand) Kerrin Harrison	(New Zealand) Ferdy Wiranata (New Zealand) Igor Gantchitis	(New Zealand) Andrew Halliday (New Zealand) Daniel Shirley
1999	(Australia) Peter Blackburn (Australia) David Bamford	(New Zealand) Daniel Shirley (New Zealand) Dean Galt	(New Zealand) Geoff Bellingham (New Zealand) Chris Blair	(Australia) Boyd Cooper (Australia) Travis Denney
2002	(Australia) Peter Blackburn (Australia) Murray Hocking	(Australia) Stuart Brehaut (Australia) Travis Denney	(New Zealand) John Gordon (New Zealand) Daniel Shirley	(Australia) Boyd Cooper (Australia) Nathan Malpass
2004	(New Zealand) John Gordon (New Zealand) Daniel Shirley	(New Zealand) Geoff Bellingham (New Zealand) Craig Cooper	(Australia) Stuart Brehaut (Australia) Travis Denney	(Australia) Boyd Cooper (Australia) Hung Pham
2006	(New Zealand) Geoff Bellingham (New Zealand) Craig Cooper	(New Zealand) John Gordon (New Zealand) Daniel Shirley	(Australia) Ross Smith (Australia) Glenn Warfe	(Australia) Ashley Brehaut (Australia) Travis Denney
2008	(Australia) Glenn Warfe (Australia) Ross Smith	(New Zealand) Nathan Hannam (New Zealand) Henry Tam	(New Zealand) James Eunson (New Zealand) Ethan Haggo	(New Zealand) Kevin Dennerly-Minturn (New Zealand) Joe Wu
2010	(Australia) Glenn Warfe (Australia) Ross Smith	(New Zealand) Oliver Leydon-Davis (New Zealand) Henry Tam	(Australia) Saliya Gunaratne (Australia) Chad Whitehead	(New Zealand) James Paterson (New Zealand) Brent Miller
2012	(Australia) Glenn Warfe (Australia) Ross Smith	(New Zealand) Oliver Leydon-Davis (New Zealand) Kevin Dennerly-Minturn	(Australia) Nathan David (Australia) Joel Findlay	(New Zealand) Maika Phillips (New Zealand) Elliot Pike
2014	(Australia) Glenn Warfe (Australia) Raymond Tam	(Australia) Matthew Chau (Australia) Sawan Serasinghe	(New Zealand) Kevin Dennerly-Minturn (New Zealand) Oliver Leydon-Davis	(Australia) Luke Chong (Australia) Joel Findlay
2015	(Australia) Matthew Chau (Australia) Sawan Serasinghe	(New Zealand) Kevin Dennerly-Minturn (New Zealand) Oliver Leydon-Davis	(New Zealand) Maoni Hu He (New Zealand) Kent Palmer	(Australia) Anthony Joe (Australia) Pit Seng Low
2016	(Australia) Matthew Chau (Australia) Sawan Serasinghe	(French Polynesia) Léo Cucuel (French Polynesia) Rémi Rossi	(Australia) Daniel Fan (Australia) Simon Leung	(Australia) Anthony Joe (Australia) Pit Seng Low
2017	(Australia) Matthew Chau (Australia) Sawan Serasinghe	(New Zealand) Kevin Dennerly-Minturn (New Zealand) Niccolo Tagle	(New Zealand) Jonathan Curtin (New Zealand) Dhanny Oud	(Australia) Mitchell Wheller (Australia) Simon Leung
2018	(Australia) Matthew Chau (Australia) Sawan Serasinghe	(Australia) Robin Middleton (Australia) Ross Smith	(New Zealand) Oscar Guo (New Zealand) Dacmen Vong	(Australia) Mitchell Wheller (Australia) Simon Leung
2019	(Australia) Sawan Serasinghe (Australia) Eric Vuong	(Australia) Simon Leung (Australia) Mitchell Wheller	(Australia) Lukas Defolky (Australia) Raymond Tam	(Australia) Jacob Schueler (Australia) Felix Wang
2020	(New Zealand) Oliver Leydon-Davis (New Zealand) Abhinav Manota	(Australia) Matthew Chau (Australia) Sawan Serasinghe	(Australia) Lukas Defolky (Australia) Raymond Tam	(Australia) Lin Ying Xiang (Australia) Teoh Kai Chen
2022	(New Zealand) Abhinav Manota (New Zealand) Jack Wang	(Australia) Kenneth Choo (Australia) Lim Ming Chuen	(Australia) Jordan Yang (Australia) Frederick Zhao	(Australia) Lin Ying Xiang (Australia) Teoh Kai Chen
2023	(Australia) Kenneth Choo (Australia) Rayne Wang	(New Zealand) Alan Chan (New Zealand) Chance Cheng	(Australia) Keith Mark Edison (Australia) Mitchell Wheller	(Australia) Lim Ming Chuen (Australia) Jack Yu
2024	(Australia) Lukas Defolky (Australia) Tang Huaidong	(New Zealand) Adam Jeffrey (New Zealand) Dylan Soedjasa	(New Zealand) Chris Benzie (New Zealand) Daniel Hu	(Australia) Ken Richardson (Australia) Ephraim Stephen Sam
2025	(New Zealand) Adam Jeffrey (New Zealand) Dylan Soedjasa	(Australia) Tang Huaidong (Australia) Frederick Zhao	(New Zealand) Vincent Tao (New Zealand) Dacmen Vong	(New Zealand) Chan Yun Lung (New Zealand) Chance Cheng
2026	(Australia) Rizky Hidayat (Australia) Jack Yu	(New Zealand) Chris Benzie (New Zealand) Dylan Soedjasa	(New Zealand) Vincent Tao (New Zealand) Dacmen Vong	(New Zealand) Raphael Chris Deloy (New Zealand) Adam Jeffrey

==== Women's doubles ====
Year	1st place, gold medalist(s)	2nd place, silver medalist(s)	3rd place, bronze medalist(s)	
1997	(New Zealand) Li Feng (New Zealand) Sheree Jefferson	(New Zealand) Rhona Robertson (New Zealand) Tammy Jenkins	(New Zealand) Megan Heaney (New Zealand) A. Wilson	(Australia) Rhonda Cator (Australia) Kellie Lucas
1999	(Australia) Rhonda Cator (Australia) Amanda Hardy	(New Zealand) Li Feng (New Zealand) Tammy Jenkins	(Australia) Rayoni Head (Australia) Kate Wilson-Smith	(New Zealand) Nicole Gordon (New Zealand) Rhona Robertson
2002	(New Zealand) Tammy Jenkins (New Zealand) Rhona Robertson	(Australia) Rhonda Cator (Australia) Kate Wilson-Smith	(Australia) Kellie Lucas (Australia) Jane Crabtree	(New Zealand) Sara Runesten-Petersen (New Zealand) Nicole Gordon
2004	(New Zealand) Sara Runesten-Petersen (New Zealand) Nicole Gordon	(Australia) Kate Wilson-Smith (Australia) Jane Crabtree	(Australia) Kellie Lucas (Australia) Tania Luiz	(New Zealand) Donna Cranston (New Zealand) Kimberly Windsor
2006	(New Zealand) Sara Runesten-Petersen (New Zealand) Nicole Gordon	(New Zealand) Rebecca Bellingham (New Zealand) Rachel Hindley	(Australia) Kellie Lucas (Australia) Kate Wilson-Smith	(New Zealand) Renee Flavell (New Zealand) Donna Cranston
2008	(New Zealand) Michelle Chan (New Zealand) Rachel Hindley	(New Zealand) Renee Flavell (New Zealand) Donna Cranston	(Australia) Tania Luiz (Australia) Eugenia Tanaka	(Australia) Erin Carroll (Australia) Leisha Cooper
2010	(Australia) Leanne Choo (Australia) Kate Wilson-Smith	(Australia) Ann-Louise Slee (Australia) Leisha Cooper	(New Zealand) Danielle Barry (New Zealand) Donna Haliday	(New Zealand) Stephanie Cheng (New Zealand) Victoria Cheng
2012	(Australia) Leanne Choo (Australia) Renuga Veeran	(Australia) Ann-Louise Slee (Australia) Eugenia Tanaka	(Australia) Vinning Mak (Australia) Natasha Sharp	(Australia) Verdet Kessler (Australia) Talia Saunders
2014	(Australia) Jacqueline Guan (Australia) Gronya Somerville	(Australia) Jacinta Joe (Australia) Louisa Ma	(Australia) He Tian Tang (Australia) Renuga Veeran	(Australia) Tara Pilven (Australia) Talia Saunders
2015	(Australia) Leanne Choo (Australia) Gronya Somerville	(Australia) Talia Saunders (Australia) Jennifer Tam	(New Zealand) Emma Chapple (New Zealand) Danielle Tahuri	(Australia) Chen Hsuan-yu (Australia) Louisa Ma
2016	(Australia) Tiffany Ho (Australia) Jennifer Tam	(Australia) Gronya Somerville (Australia) Melinda Sun	(French Polynesia) Aurelie Boutin (French Polynesia) Chloé Segrestan	(French Polynesia) Miriau Prununosa (French Polynesia) Julie Segrestan
2017	(Australia) Setyana Mapasa (Australia) Gronya Somerville	(Australia) Tiffany Ho (Australia) Joy Lai	(New Zealand) Vicki Copeland (New Zealand) Anona Pak	(New Zealand) Susannah Leydon-Davis (New Zealand) Danielle Tahuri
2018	(Australia) Setyana Mapasa (Australia) Gronya Somerville	(Australia) Leanne Choo (Australia) Renuga Veeran	(New Zealand) Anona Pak (New Zealand) Danielle Tahuri	(New Zealand) Sally Fu (New Zealand) Alyssa Tagle
2019	(Australia) Setyana Mapasa (Australia) Gronya Somerville	(Australia) Jiang Yingzi (Australia) Louisa Ma	(New Zealand) Erena Calder-Hawkins (New Zealand) Anona Pak	(Australia) Jessica Lim (Australia) Talia Saunders
2020	(Australia) Setyana Mapasa (Australia) Gronya Somerville	(New Zealand) Sally Fu (New Zealand) Alyssa Tagle	(Australia) Tiffany Ho (Australia) Jodee Vega	(Australia) Majan Almazan (Australia) Kaitlyn Ea
2022	(Australia) Joyce Choong (Australia) Sylvina Kurniawan	(Australia) Kaitlyn Ea (Australia) Gronya Somerville	(Australia) Jazmine Lam (Australia) Sydney Tjonadi	(Australia) Dania Nugroho (Australia) Catrina Tan Chia-yu
2023	(Australia) Sylvina Kurniawan (Australia) Setyana Mapasa	(Australia) Tiffany Ho (Australia) Khoo Lee Yen	(Australia) Joyce Choong (Australia) Gronya Somerville	(Australia) Priska Kustiadi (Australia) Carina Sam
2024	(Australia) Setyana Mapasa (Australia) Angela Yu	(Australia) Kaitlyn Ea (Australia) Gronya Somerville	(New Zealand) Erena Calder-Hawkins (New Zealand) Anona Pak	(Australia) Dania Nugroho (Australia) Catrina Tan Chia-yu
2025	(Australia) Gronya Somerville (Australia) Angela Yu	(Australia) Mimi Ngo (Australia) Maureen Clarissa Wijayaa	(Australia) Priska Kustiadi (New Zealand) Camellia Zhou	(Australia) Maggie Chan (Australia) Kaitlyn Ea
2026	(Australia) Gronya Somerville (Australia) Angela Yu	(New Zealand) Berry Ng (New Zealand) Amanda Ting	(Australia) Jesslyn Carrisia (Australia) Faye Huo	(Australia) Jazmine Lam (Australia) Lim Yee-yuan

==== Mixed doubles ====
Year	1st place, gold medalist(s)	2nd place, silver medalist(s)	3rd place, bronze medalist(s)	
1997	(New Zealand) Daniel Shirley (New Zealand) Tammy Jenkins	(Australia) Peter Blackburn (Australia) Rhonda Cator	(Australia) Stuart Brehaut (Australia) Kellie Lucas	(New Zealand) Glenn Walker (New Zealand) Sheree Jefferson
1999	(Australia) Peter Blackburn (Australia) Rhonda Cator	(Australia) David Bamford (Australia) Amanda Hardy	(New Zealand) Daniel Shirley (New Zealand) Tammy Jenkins	(New Zealand) Dean Galt (New Zealand) Lianne Shirley
2002	(New Zealand) Daniel Shirley (New Zealand) Sara Runesten-Petersen	(Australia) Travis Denney (Australia) Kate Wilson-Smith	(New Zealand) John Moody (New Zealand) Lianne Shirley	(New Zealand) Craig Cooper (New Zealand) Tammy Jenkins
2004	(New Zealand) Daniel Shirley (New Zealand) Sara Runesten-Petersen	(Australia) Travis Denney (Australia) Kate Wilson-Smith	(Australia) Stuart Brehaut (Australia) Tania Luiz	(Australia) Boyd Cooper (Australia) Kellie Lucas
2006	(New Zealand) Daniel Shirley (New Zealand) Sara Runesten-Petersen	(Australia) Travis Denney (Australia) Kate Wilson-Smith	(New Zealand) Craig Cooper (New Zealand) Renee Flavell	(New Zealand) Henry Tam (New Zealand) Lianne Shirley
2008	(New Zealand) Henry Tam (New Zealand) Donna Cranston	(New Zealand) Craig Cooper (New Zealand) Renee Flavell	(Australia) Ben Walklate (Australia) Erin Carroll	(New Zealand) Kevin Dennerly-Minturn (New Zealand) Emma Rodgers
2010	(Australia) Glenn Warfe (Australia) Kate Wilson-Smith	(New Zealand) Henry Tam (New Zealand) Donna Halliday	(Australia) Chad Whitehead (Australia) Leanne Choo	(New Zealand) James Eunson (New Zealand) Stephanie Cheng
2012	(Australia) Raymond Tam (Australia) Eugenia Tanaka	(Australia) Glenn Warfe (Australia) Leanne Choo	(Australia) Ross Smith (Australia) Gronya Somerville	(Australia) Luke Chong (Australia) Victoria Na
2014	(New Zealand) Oliver Leydon-Davis (New Zealand) Susannah Leydon-Davis	(Australia) Matthew Chau (Australia) Jacqueline Guan	(Australia) Luke Chong (Australia) Talia Saunders	(Australia) Raymond Tam (Australia) Gronya Somerville
2015	(Australia) Robin Middleton (Australia) Leanne Choo	(New Zealand) Oliver Leydon-Davis (New Zealand) Danielle Tahuri	(Australia) Matthew Chau (Australia) Gronya Somerville	(Australia) Michael Fariman (Australia) Talia Saunders
2016	(Australia) Robin Middleton (Australia) Leanne Choo	(Australia) Anthony Joe (Australia) Joy Lai	(French Polynesia) Léo Cucuel (French Polynesia) Aurelie Boutin	(Australia) Simon Leung (Australia) Tiffany Ho
2017	(Australia) Sawan Serasinghe (Australia) Setyana Mapasa	(Australia) Joel Findlay (Australia) Gronya Somerville	(Australia) Mitchell Wheller (Australia) Chen Hsuan-yu	(New Zealand) Kevin Dennerly-Minturn (New Zealand) Danielle Tahuri
2018	(Australia) Sawan Serasinghe (Australia) Setyana Mapasa	(Australia) Matthew Chau (Australia) Leanne Choo	(New Zealand) Oliver Leydon-Davis (New Zealand) Susannah Leydon-Davis	(New Zealand) Niccolo Tagle (New Zealand) Alyssa Tagle
2019	(Australia) Simon Leung (Australia) Gronya Somerville	(Australia) Sawan Serasinghe (Australia) Khoo Lee Yen	(Australia) Tang Huaidong (Australia) Setyana Mapasa	(Australia) Mitchell Wheller (Australia) Jessica Lim
2020	(Australia) Simon Leung (Australia) Gronya Somerville	(Australia) Tran Hoang Pham (Australia) Sylvina Kurniawan	(Australia) Raymond Tam (Australia) Jessica Lim	(New Zealand) Dylan Soedjasa (New Zealand) Alyssa Tagle
2022	(Australia) Kenneth Choo (Australia) Gronya Somerville	(New Zealand) Oliver Leydon-Davis (New Zealand) Anona Pak	(Australia) Mitchell Wheller (Australia) Angela Yu	(Australia) Jordan Yang (Australia) Maureen Wijaya
2023	(Australia) Kenneth Choo (Australia) Gronya Somerville	(Australia) Lim Ming Chuen (Australia) Sylvina Kurniawan	(Australia) Gavin Kyjac Ong (Australia) Khoo Lee Yen	(Australia) Ricky Tang (Australia) Kaitlyn Ea
2024	(Australia) Kenneth Choo (Australia) Gronya Somerville	(New Zealand) Edward Lau (New Zealand) Shaunna Li	(New Zealand) Vincent Tao (New Zealand) Alyssa Tagle	(Australia) Rayne Wang (Australia) Kaitlyn Ea
2025	(New Zealand) Vincent Tao (Australia) Gronya Somerville	(New Zealand) Edward Lau (New Zealand) Shaunna Li	(New Zealand) Dylan Soedjasa (New Zealand) Camellia Zhou	(New Zealand) Dacmen Vong (Australia) Priska Kustiadi
2026	(Australia) Andika Ramadiansyah (Australia) Angela Yu	(New Zealand) Ricky Cheng (New Zealand) Natalie Ting	(Australia) Rizky Hidayat (Australia) Gronya Somerville	(New Zealand) Adam Jeffrey (New Zealand) Laura Lin

== Oceania Mixed Team Badminton Championships ==
Year	Host city	Winner	Runner-up	Third place	Ref
1999	Brisbane, Australia	Australia	New Zealand	New Caledonia	
2002	Suva, Fiji	Australia	New Zealand	Fiji	
2004	Waitakere City, New Zealand	New Zealand	Australia	New Caledonia	
2006	Auckland, New Zealand	New Zealand	Australia	Fiji	
2008	Nouméa, New Caledonia	New Zealand	Australia	New Caledonia	
2010	Invercargill, New Zealand	Australia	New Zealand	Fiji	
2012	Ballarat, New Zealand	Australia	New Zealand 1	New Zealand 2	
2014	Ballarat, Australia	Australia	New Zealand	New Caledonia	
2016	Auckland, New Zealand	Australia	New Zealand	Tahiti	
2019	Melbourne, Australia	Australia	New Zealand	New Caledonia	
2023	Auckland, New Zealand	Australia	New Zealand	New Caledonia	
2025	Auckland, New Zealand	Australia	New Zealand	Tahiti	

== Oceania Men's and Women's Team Badminton Championships ==
Men's Team

Year	Host city	Winner	Runner-up	Third place
2008	Nouméa, New Caledonia	New Zealand	Australia	no data
2010	Invercargill, New Zealand	Australia	New Zealand	New Caledonia
2012	Ballarat, Australia	New Zealand	Australia	New Caledonia
2016	Auckland, New Zealand	New Zealand	Australia	Tahiti
2018	Hamilton, New Zealand	Australia	New Zealand	Tahiti
2020	Ballarat, Australia	Australia	New Zealand	Tahiti
2024	Geelong, Australia	Australia	New Zealand	Tahiti
2026	Auckland, New Zealand	Australia	New Zealand	Tahiti

Women's Team

Year	Host city	Winner	Runner-up	Third place
2008	Nouméa, New Caledonia	New Zealand	Australia	no data
2010	Invercargill, New Zealand	Australia	New Zealand	New Caledonia
2012	Ballarat, Australia	Australia	New Zealand	New Caledonia
2016	Auckland, New Zealand	Australia	New Zealand	New Caledonia
2018	Hamilton, New Zealand	Australia	New Zealand	Fiji
2020	Ballarat, Australia	Australia	New Zealand	New Caledonia
2024	Geelong, Australia	Australia	New Zealand	Tahiti
2026	Auckland, New Zealand	Australia	New Zealand	Tahiti

== See also ==
- Oceania Junior Badminton Championships
