= Natasha Sharp =

Natasha Sharp may refer to:

- Natasha Sharp (badminton), Australian badminton player
- Natasha Raskin Sharp, Scottish television presenter
