= Joel Findlay =

Australian badminton player (born 1989)

Personal information
- Born: Joel Alexander Findlay; 29 June 1989 (age 37) Ballarat, Australia

Sport
- Country: Australia
- Sport: Badminton

Men's
- Highest ranking: 301 (MS) 24 May 2012; 114 (MD) 29 Mar 2012; 166 (XD) 12 Jul 2012
- BWF profile
Medal record
Badminton
Representing Australia
Oceania Championships
Silver medal – second place	2017 Nouméa	Mixed doubles
Bronze medal – third place	2014 Ballarat	Men's doubles
Bronze medal – third place	2012 Ballarat	Men's doubles

Joel Alexander Findlay (born 29 June 1989) is an Australian male badminton player. In 2014, he won the men's doubles title at the Australian National Badminton Championships teamed up with fellow Victorian Luke Chong. He and Chong also won bronze medal at the 2014 Oceania Badminton Championships. In 2017, he won the silver medal at the Oceania Championships in the mixed doubles event partnered with Gronya Somerville.

== Achievements ==
=== Oceania Championships ===
Men's Doubles
Year	Venue	Partner	Opponent	Score	Result
2014	Ken Kay Badminton Hall; Ballarat, Australia	(Australia) Luke Chong	(Australia) Raymond Tam (Australia) Glenn Warfe	8–21, 15–21	Bronze
2012	Ken Kay Badminton Hall; Ballarat, Australia	(Australia) Nathan David	(New Zealand) Kevin Dennerly-Minturn (New Zealand) Oliver Leydon-Davis	16–21, 7–21	Bronze

Mixed Doubles
Year	Venue	Partner	Opponent	Score	Result
2017	Salle Anewy; Nouméa, New Caledonia	(Australia) Gronya Somerville	(Australia) Sawan Serasinghe (Australia) Setyana Mapasa	19–21, 9–21	Silver

=== BWF International Challenge/Series ===
Men's Doubles
Year	Tournament	Partner	Opponent	Score	Result
2017	Nouméa International	(Australia) Jeff Tho	(Australia) Matthew Chau (Australia) Sawan Serasinghe	21–17, 7–21, 14–21	(silver) Runner-up

BWF International Series tournament
