= Verdet Kessler =

Australian badminton player (born 1994)

Personal information
- Born: Verdet Emily Caci Kessler; 24 May 1994 (age 32) Adelaide, Australia

Sport
- Country: Australia
- Sport: Badminton

Women's
- Highest ranking: 102 (WS) 4 December 2014; 106 (WD) 23 October 2014; 375 (XD) 5 April 2012
- BWF profile
Medal record
Badminton
Representing Australia
Oceania Championships
Gold medal – first place	2014 Ballarat	Women's singles
Oceania Mixed Team Championships
Gold medal – first place	2014 Ballarat	Mixed team
Gold medal – first place	2012 Ballarat	Mixed team
Oceania Women's Team Championships
Gold medal – first place	2012 Ballarat	Women's team
Oceania Junior Championships
Silver medal – second place	2011 Suva	Mixed team
Bronze medal – third place	2011 Suva	Girls' doubles

Verdet Emily Caci Kessler (born 24 May 1994) is an Australian badminton player. Kessler was the women's singles national champion in 2013 and 2014, and also won the women's singles title at the Oceania Championships in 2014.

== Early life and career ==
Kessler is the daughter of a Bermudian ballet dancer (Verniece Benjamin) and German handballer (Detlef Kessler). She began playing badminton at the age of seven after trying it at a holiday clinic, taking up weekly training at the age of twelve and joining her first junior state team a year later. Her home club is the Glenelg Badminton Club.

== Career ==
In 2009, Kessler won the girls' doubles event at the U-19 Australian Junior International tournament partnered with Leanne Choo. She was also selected to join the Australian Junior Commonwealth Games squad. In 2011, she won the silver and bronze medal at the Oceania Junior Championships in the mixed team and girls' doubles respectively. In 2012, she represented her country at the World Junior Championships in Japan. In 2014, she won the women's singles title at the Oceania Championships after beat Michelle Chan of New Zealand. At the same year, she competed at the Glasgow Commonwealth Games. Also in 2014, at the Ede Clendinnen Shield event, she was awarded the Cliff Cutt Trophy for exhibiting the "highest standards of sportsmanship, personality, court demeanour, playing ability and appearance throughout the tournament".

== Achievements ==
=== Oceania Championships ===
Women's singles
Year	Venue	Opponent	Score	Result
2014	Ken Kay Badminton Stadium; Ballarat, Australia	(New Zealand) Michelle Chan	21–23, 21–14, 21–14	Gold
2012	Ken Kay Badminton Stadium; Ballarat, Australia	(New Zealand) Michelle Chan	10–21, 17–21	Silver

Women's doubles
Year	Venue	Partner	Opponent	Score	Result
2012	Ken Kay Badminton Hall; Ballarat, Australia	(Australia) Talia Saunders	(Australia) Ann-Louise Slee (Australia) Eugenia Tanaka	11–21, 21–23	Bronze

=== Oceania Junior Championships ===
Girls' doubles
Year	Venue	Partner	Opponent	Score	Result
2011	Yat Sen School; Suva, Fiji	(Australia) Tara Pilven	(New Zealand) Victoria Cheng (New Zealand) Mary O'Connor	13–21, 21–18, 15–21	Bronze
