= Daniel Guda =

Australian badminton player (born 1996)

Personal information
- Born: Daniel Lewis Guda; 22 June 1996 (age 30) Manila, Philippines

Sport
- Country: Australia
- Sport: Badminton

Men's
- Highest ranking: 135 (MS) 20 August 2015; 322 (MD) 18 September 2014; 145 (XD) 3 December 2015
- BWF profile
Medal record
Badminton
Representing Australia
Oceania Championships
Gold medal – first place	2015 North Harbour	Men's singles
Oceania Mixed Team Championships
Gold medal – first place	2014 Ballarat	Mixed team
Oceania Junior Championships
Gold medal – first place	2013 Papeete	Boys' singles
Gold medal – first place	2013 Papeete	Mixed team
Bronze medal – third place	2013 Papeete	Mixed doubles

Daniel Lewis Guda (born 22 June 1996) is an Australian male badminton player. In 2013, the Manila, Philippines born, Guda won the boys' singles title at the Oceania Junior Championships. In 2014, he competed at the Nanjing Summer Youth Olympics. In the senior event, he won the 2015 Oceania Championships in the men's singles event after beating Luke Charlesworth of New Zealand.

== Achievements ==
=== Oceania Championships ===
Men's Singles
Year	Venue	Opponent	Score	Result
2015	X-TRM North Harbour Badminton Centre; Auckland, New Zealand	(New Zealand) Luke Charlesworth	21–11, 15–21, 21–19	Gold

=== Oceania Junior Championships ===
Boys' Singles
Year	Venue	Opponent	Score	Result
2013	University of French Polynesia Sports Hall; Papeete, Tahiti	(French Polynesia) Rémi Rossi	21–14, 22–20	Gold

Mixed Doubles
Year	Venue	Partner	Opponent	Score	Result
2013	University of French Polynesia Sports Hall; Papeete, Tahiti	(Australia) Nathasa Sharp	(New Zealand) Daniel Yin-Hai Lee (New Zealand) Rayna Philipps	21–14, 19–21, 10–21	Bronze
