= Luke Charlesworth =

New Zealand badminton player (born 1992)

Personal information
- Born: 4 February 1992 (age 34) Auckland, New Zealand
- Height: 1.80 m (5 ft 11 in)

Sport
- Country: New Zealand
- Sport: Badminton

Men's
- Highest ranking: 187 (MS) 13 September 2012; 206 (MD) 22 April 2010; 150 (XD) 15 April 2010
- BWF profile
Medal record
Badminton
Representing New Zealand
Oceania Championships
Silver medal – second place	2015 North Harbour	Men's singles
Bronze medal – third place	2012 Ballarat	Men's singles
Oceania Mixed Team Championships
Silver medal – second place	2012 Ballarat	Mixed team
Oceania Men's Team Championships
Gold medal – first place	2012 Ballarat	Men's team

Luke Charlesworth (born 4 February 1992) is a New Zealand male badminton player. In 2014, he became the champion at the New Zealand National Badminton Championships. He also won the 2013 New Caledonia International tournament in the men's doubles event and the runner-up in the singles event. At the Oceania Championships, he won the men's singles bronze in 2012 and silver in 2015.

== Achievements ==
=== Oceania Championships ===
Men's Singles
Year	Venue	Opponent	Score	Result
2015	X-TRM North Harbour Badminton Centre; Auckland, New Zealand	(Australia) Daniel Guda	11–21, 21–15, 19–21	Silver
2012	Ken Kay Badminton Hall; Ballarat, Australia	(New Zealand) James Eunson	16–21, 17–21	Bronze

=== BWF International Challenge/Series ===
Men's Singles
Year	Tournament	Opponent	Score	Result
2013	New Caledonia International	(Australia) Wesley Caulkett	13–21, 23–21, 12–21	(silver) Runner-up

Men's Doubles
Year	Tournament	Partner	Opponent	Score	Result
2013	New Caledonia International	(New Zealand) Asher Richardson	(Australia) Wesley Caulkett (New Caledonia) Julien Pactat	21–19, 19–21, 21–11	(gold) Winner

BWF International Challenge tournament
BWF International Series tournament
BWF Future Series tournament
