= Natasha Sharp (badminton) =

Australian badminton player

Personal information
- Born: 10 August 1995 (age 30) Sydney, Australia

Sport
- Country: Australia
- Sport: Badminton
- Club: Balgowlah Suns
Medal record
Badminton
Representing Australia
Oceania Badminton Championships
Bronze medal – third place	2012 Ballarat	Women's doubles

Natasha Sharp (born 10 August 1995) is an Australian badminton player who competes in international level events. Her highest achievement is winning a bronze medal at the 2012 Oceania Badminton Championships in the women's doubles. She has also participated at the 2012 BWF World Junior Championships but did not medal.
