= Ross Smith (badminton) =

Australian badminton player (born 1985)

Personal information
- Born: Ross James Smith; 11 April 1985 (age 41) Swan Hill, Victoria, Australia
- Years active: 2004
- Height: 1.94 m (6 ft 4 in)
- Weight: 83 kg (183 lb)

Sport
- Country: Australia
- Sport: Badminton
- Handedness: Right

Men's & mixed doubles
- Highest ranking: 31 (MD 7 June 2012); 49 (XD 16 January 2014)
- BWF profile
Medal record
Men's badminton
Representing Australia
Oceania Championships
Gold medal – first place	2012 Ballarat	Men's doubles
Gold medal – first place	2010 Invercargill	Men's doubles
Gold medal – first place	2008 Nouméa	Men's doubles
Silver medal – second place	2018 Hamilton	Men's doubles
Bronze medal – third place	2012 Ballarat	Mixed doubles
Bronze medal – third place	2006 Auckland	Men's doubles
Oceania Mixed Team Championships
Gold medal – first place	2014 Ballarat	Mixed team
Gold medal – first place	2012 Ballarat	Mixed team
Gold medal – first place	2010 Invercargill	Mixed team
Silver medal – second place	2008 Nouméa	Mixed team
Silver medal – second place	2006 Auckland	Mixed team
Oceania Men's Team Championships
Gold medal – first place	2018 Hamilton	Men's team
Gold medal – first place	2010 Invercargill	Men's team
Silver medal – second place	2012 Ballarat	Men's team
Silver medal – second place	2008 Nouméa	Men's team
Silver medal – second place	2006 Auckland	Men's team

Ross James Smith (born 11 April 1985) is an Australian badminton player who specialises in the doubles event. He competed for Australia at the 2008 and 2012 Summer Olympics, partnering Glenn Warfe. He also represented Australia at the 2006, 2010, 2014, and 2018 Commonwealth Games.

== Achievements ==
=== Oceania Championships ===
Men's doubles
Year	Venue	Partner	Opponent	Score	Result
2018	Eastlink Badminton Stadium; Hamilton, New Zealand	(Australia) Robin Middleton	(Australia) Matthew Chau (Australia) Sawan Serasinghe	17–21, 21–23	Silver
2012	Ken Kay Badminton Stadium; Ballarat, Australia	(Australia) Glenn Warfe	(New Zealand) Kevin Dennerly-Minturn (New Zealand) Oliver Leydon-Davis	21–17, 21–18	Gold
2010	Stadium Southland; Invercargill, New Zealand	(Australia) Glenn Warfe	(New Zealand) Oliver Leydon-Davis (New Zealand) Henry Tam	21–19, 21–12	Gold
2008	Nouméa, New Caledonia	(Australia) Glenn Warfe	(New Zealand) Nathan Hannam (New Zealand) Henry Tam	21–13, 21–18	Gold
2006	Auckland, New Zealand	(Australia) Glenn Warfe	(New Zealand) John Gordon (New Zealand) Daniel Shirley	15–21, 16–21	Bronze

Mixed doubles
Year	Venue	Partner	Opponent	Score	Result
2012	Ken Kay Badminton Stadium; Ballarat, Australia	(Australia) Gronya Somerville	(Australia) Glenn Warfe (Australia) Leanne Choo	11–21, 17–21	Bronze

=== BWF International Challenge/Series ===
Men's doubles
Year	Tournament	Partner	Opponent	Score	Result
2014	Vietnam International	(Australia) Robin Middleton	(Indonesia) Selvanus Geh (Indonesia) Kevin Sanjaya Sukamuljo	14–21, 13–21	(silver) Runner-up
2013	Welsh International	(Australia) Robin Middleton	(England) Christopher Coles (England) Matthew Nottingham	17–21, 15–21	(silver) Runner-up
2013	Victorian International	(Australia) Robin Middleton	(Australia) Raymond Tam (Australia) Glenn Warfe	21–19, 19–21, 21–17	(gold) Winner
2013	Auckland International	(Australia) Robin Middleton	(Australia) Raymond Tam (Australia) Glenn Warfe	21–16, 21–8	(gold) Winner
2012	Tahiti International	(Australia) Glenn Warfe	(Canada) Adrian Liu (Canada) Derrick Ng	21–23, 13–21	(silver) Runner-up
2011	Altona International	(Australia) Glenn Warfe	(New Zealand) Kevin Dennerly-Minturn (New Zealand) Oliver Leydon-Davis	21–17, 21–13	(gold) Winner
2010	Tahiti International	(Australia) Glenn Warfe	(New Zealand) Maoni Hu He (New Zealand) Oliver Leydon-Davis	21–11, 21–12	(gold) Winner
2010	Altona International	(Australia) Glenn Warfe	(United States) Daniel Gouw (United States) Arnold Setiadi	21–16, 21–10	(gold) Winner
2006	Waikato International	(Australia) Glenn Warfe	(New Zealand) Chance Cheng (New Zealand) Joe Wu	20–22, 21–17, 21–9	(gold) Winner
2006	Ballarat International	(Australia) Glenn Warfe	(Australia) Ashley Brehaut (Malaysia) Roslin Hashim	21–12, 21–16	(gold) Winner
2005	New Caledonia International	(Australia) Glenn Warfe	(Australia) Stuart Gomez (New Zealand) Scott Menzies	15–8, 15–7	(gold) Winner
2005	Fiji International	(Australia) Glenn Warfe	(Fiji) Damien Ah Sam (Fiji) Burty Molia	15–7, 15–1	(gold) Winner

Mixed doubles
Year	Tournament	Partner	Opponent	Score	Result
2014	Maribyrnong International	(Australia) Renuga Veeran	(Malaysia) Mohamad Arif Abdul Latif (Indonesia) Rusdina Antardayu Riodingin	18–21, 11–21	(silver) Runner-up
2013	Victorian International	(Australia) Renuga Veeran	(Australia) Robin Middleton (Australia) He Tian Tang	19–21, 21–19, 19–21	(silver) Runner-up
2013	Auckland International	(Australia) Renuga Veeran	(Australia) Raymond Tam (Australia) Gronya Somerville	21–16, 21–12	(gold) Winner
2012	Victorian International	(Australia) Renuga Veeran	(Indonesia) Andika Anhar (Indonesia) Keshya Nurvita Hanadia	17–21, 12–21	(silver) Runner-up
2012	Tahiti International	(Australia) Renuga Veeran	(Canada) Derrick Ng (Canada) Alex Bruce	23–21, 21–14	(gold) Winner
2010	Tahiti International	(Australia) Kate Wilson-Smith	(Australia) Glenn Warfe (Australia) Leanne Choo	21–14, 13–21, 21–18	(gold) Winner

BWF International Challenge tournament
BWF International Series tournament
BWF Future Series tournament
