= Renuga Veeran =

Malaysian-Australian badminton player (born 1986)

Personal information
- Full name: Renuga Vithi Veeran
- Born: 20 June 1986 (age 40) Kuala Lumpur, Malaysia
- Height: 1.65 m (5 ft 5 in)
- Weight: 65 kg (143 lb)

Sport
- Country: Malaysia; Australia
- Sport: Badminton
- Handedness: Right

Women's singles & doubles
- Highest ranking: 77 (WS 17 June 2010); 26 (WD 22 September 2011); 40 (XD 5 August 2010)
- BWF profile
Medal record
Women's badminton
Representing Australia
Oceania Championships
Gold medal – first place	2012 Ballarat	Women's doubles
Silver medal – second place	2018 Hamilton	Women's doubles
Bronze medal – third place	2014 Ballarat	Women's doubles
Oceania Mixed Team Championships
Gold medal – first place	2014 Ballarat	Mixed team
Gold medal – first place	2012 Ballarat	Mixed team
Gold medal – first place	2010 Invercargill	Mixed team
Oceania Women's Team Championships
Gold medal – first place	2012 Ballarat	Women's team
Gold medal – first place	2010 Invercargill	Women's team

Renuga Vithi Veeran (born 20 June 1986) is a Malaysian-born Australian badminton player. She has represented both Malaysia and Australia internationally as a badminton player. As part of the Australian Olympic Team, she paired with Leanne Choo and reached the quarter-finals in the women's doubles competition at the 2012 Summer Olympics.

== Personal ==
Veeran, nicknamed Nunu and Nuges, was born on 20 June 1986 in Kuala Lumpur, Malaysia. Her mother, father and brother (Raj Veeran) all played badminton, representing Malaysia in international competitions.

Veeran is an ethnic Tamilian, and speaks Tamil fluently. She gave an interview in Tamil language to the Australian Special Broadcasting Service (SBS) Tamil Radio a week after returning from the London Olympics. Veeran stated in the interview that she was warmly received by the Prime Minister of Australia on her return to Sydney from the games.

Veeran is 165 centimetres (65 in) tall and weighs 61 kilograms (134 lb). She is right handed.

Veeran attended primary school at Sekolah Rendah Kepong in Kuala Lumpur, Malaysia. She moved to Australia when she was sixteen years old. She attended Leichhardt High School in the Sydney suburbs for high school. She earned a Bachelor of Business in Applied Economics and International Trade from Victoria University, attending from 2007 to 2009. As of 2012, she lived in Melbourne, Victoria.

== Badminton ==
Veeran started playing badminton when she was six years old. She represents Badminton Australia on the club level, and is coached by Ricky Yu, who became her coach in 2008. She trains in Melbourne. Her highest world ranking in the women's doubles was 26th in December 2011. Her highest mixed doubles world ranking was 40th. Her world doubles ranking as of January 2012 was 30th.[2] She has held numerous top rankings in the Australasia region, including being the top-ranked female player in singles, doubles, and mixed doubles simultaneously. The year she moved to Australia, she became the number one ranked badminton player in the country when she was sixteen years old.

=== Malaysian national team ===
Veeran represented Malaysia as a member of their junior national team on the World Juniors level.

=== Australian national team ===
As of 2012, Veeran has been a member of the Australian national team for six years. As a member of the national team, she is based at the Melbourne Sports and Aquatic Centre. She has represented Australia as a member of the national team at several different competitions including the 2010 Uber Cup, the 2010 Commonwealth Games and the 2011 Sudirman Cup. Her women's doubles team which included London bound teammate Leanne Choo finished fifth at the Commonwealth Games. She also competed in the mixed doubles event and team event at the 2010 Commonwealth Games with her brother Raj, finished 17th in the individual event and fifth in the mixed team event.

Veeran finished 17th in the doubles competition at the 2012 Thomas & Uber Cup held in Wuhan, China. At the Thomas Cup, Veeran and Choo lost to South Koreans Kim Min-Jung and Ha Jung-Eun with set scores of 21–15 and 21–10. She finished 5th in the doubles competition at the 2012 Air Tahiti Nui International Challenge held in Punaauia, French Polynesia. She finished 17th in the doubles competition at the 2012 Yonex Australian Open Grand Prix Gold held in Sydney, Australia. She finished 1st in the doubles competition at the 2012 Oceania Championships, and also in the doubles competition at the 2012 Oceania Team Championships, both held in Ballarat, Australia. She finished 1st in the doubles competition at the 2012 Uber Cup Preliminaries – Oceania held in Ballarat, Australia. She finished 2nd in the doubles competition at the 2012 Thomas Cup Preliminaries – Oceania held in Ballarat, Australia.

Veeran was in Australia's badminton team for the 2012 Summer Olympics, making her Olympic debut as a 26-year-old. Going into the Olympics, as a doubles team, Veeran and Choo were ranked 35th in the world. During the qualifying process, their ranking peaked at 26th.

== Achievements ==
=== Oceania Championships ===
Women's doubles
Year	Venue	Partner	Opponent	Score	Result
2018	Eastlink Badminton Stadium; Hamilton, New Zealand	(Australia) Leanne Choo	(Australia) Setyana Mapasa (Australia) Gronya Somerville	14–21, 20–22	Silver
2014	Ken Kay Badminton Stadium; Ballarat, Australia	(Australia) Tang Hetian	(Australia) Jacinta Joe (Australia) Louisa Ma	Walkover	Bronze
2012	Ken Kay Badminton Stadium; Ballarat, Australia	(Australia) Leanne Choo	(Australia) Ann-Louise Slee (Australia) Eugenia Tanaka	21–16, 21–13	Gold

=== BWF Grand Prix ===
The BWF Grand Prix has two level such as Grand Prix and Grand Prix Gold. It is a series of badminton tournaments, sanctioned by Badminton World Federation (BWF) since 2007.

Women's doubles
Year	Tournament	Partner	Opponent	Score	Result
2014	New Zealand Open	(Australia) Tang Hetian	(Japan) Shizuka Matsuo (Japan) Mami Naito	21–13, 10–21, 21–18	(gold) Winner

BWF Grand Prix Gold tournament
BWF Grand Prix tournament

=== BWF International Challenge/Series ===
Women's singles
Year	Tournament	Opponent	Score	Result
2009	Victorian International	(Australia) Leisha Cooper	21–15, 21–13	(gold) Winner

Women's doubles
Year	Tournament	Partner	Opponent	Score	Result
2018	North Harbour International	(Australia) Leanne Choo	(New Zealand) Sally Fu (New Zealand) Susannah Leydon-Davis	21–6, 21–12	(gold) Winner
2017	Yonex / K&D Graphics International	(Australia) Leanne Choo	(Canada) Rachel Honderich (Canada) Kristen Tsai	12–21, 15–21	(silver) Runner-up
2014	Maribyrnong International	(Australia) Tang Hetian	(Chinese Taipei) Chiang Mei-hui (Indonesia) Setyana Mapasa	21–19, 25–23	(gold) Winner
2013	Italian International	(Australia) Tang Hetian	(Netherlands) Eefje Muskens (Netherlands) Selena Piek	10–21, 8–21	(silver) Runner-up
2013	Welsh International	(Australia) Tang Hetian	(Indonesia) Keshya Nurvita Hanadia (Indonesia) Devi Tika Permatasari	21–15, 21–12	(gold) Winner
2013	Victorian International	(Malaysia) Sannatasah Saniru	(Thailand) Ruethaichanok Laisuan (Thailand) Narissapat Lam	15–21, 14–21	(silver) Runner-up
2013	Auckland International	(England) Tracey Hallam	(Vietnam) Lê Thu Huyền (Vietnam) Phạm Như Thảo	21–14, 21–9	(gold) Winner
2012	Victorian International	(Australia) Leanne Choo	(Indonesia) Keshya Nurvita Hanadia (Indonesia) Devi Tika Permatasari	13–21, 11–21	(silver) Runner-up
2011	Altona International	(Australia) Leanne Choo	(New Zealand) Amanda Brown (New Zealand) Stephanie Cheng	21–10, 21–5	(gold) Winner
2010	Altona International	(Australia) Tang Hetian	(Australia) Leanne Choo (Australia) Kate Wilson-Smith	21–15, 21–15	(gold) Winner
2009	Victorian International	(Australia) Erin Carroll	(New Zealand) Danielle Barry (New Zealand) Donna Haliday	16–21, 21–19, 22–20	(gold) Winner
2004	Ballarat International	(Australia) Susan Wang	(Australia) Tania Luiz (Australia) Kate Wilson-Smith	15–7, 15–12	(gold) Winner
2004	Australian International	(Australia) Susan Wang	(Malaysia) Chor Hooi Yee (Malaysia) Lim Pek Siah	13–15, 15–8, 15–12	(gold) Winner
2003	Australia International	(Australia) Susan Wang	(Japan) Ai Hirayama (Japan) Akiko Nakashima	4–15, 11–15	(silver) Runner-up

Mixed doubles
Year	Tournament	Partner	Opponent	Score	Result
2014	Maribyrnong International	(Australia) Ross Smith	(Malaysia) Mohamad Arif Abdul Latif (Indonesia) Rusdina Antardayu Riodingin	18–21, 11–21	(silver) Runner-up
2013	Victorian International	(Australia) Ross Smith	(Australia) Robin Middleton (Australia) Tang Hetian	19–21, 21–19, 19–21	(silver) Runner-up
2013	Auckland International	(Australia) Ross Smith	(Australia) Raymond Tam (Australia) Gronya Somerville	21–16, 21–12	(gold) Winner
2012	Victorian International	(Australia) Ross Smith	(Indonesia) Andika Anhar (Indonesia) Keshya Nurvita Hanadia	17–21, 12–21	(silver) Runner-up
2012	Tahiti International	(Australia) Ross Smith	(Canada) Derrick Ng (Canada) Alex Bruce	23–21, 21–14	(gold) Winner
2010	Altona International	(Australia) Raj Veeran	(Australia) Glenn Warfe (Australia) Kate Wilson-Smith	15–21, 21–16, 21–12	(gold) Winner
2009	Scottish International	(Australia) Raj Veeran	(Russia) Alexandr Nikolaenko (Russia) Valeria Sorokina	11–21, 16–21	(silver) Runner-up
2009	Victorian International	(Australia) Raj Veeran	(New Zealand) Henry Tam (New Zealand) Donna Haliday	21–12, 21–15	(gold) Winner
2009	Auckland International	(Australia) Glenn Warfe	(Australia) Chad Whitehead (Australia) Eugenia Tanaka	21–12, 21–15	(gold) Winner

BWF International Challenge tournament
BWF International Series tournament
BWF Future Series tournament
