= Leanne Choo =

Australian badminton player (born 1991)

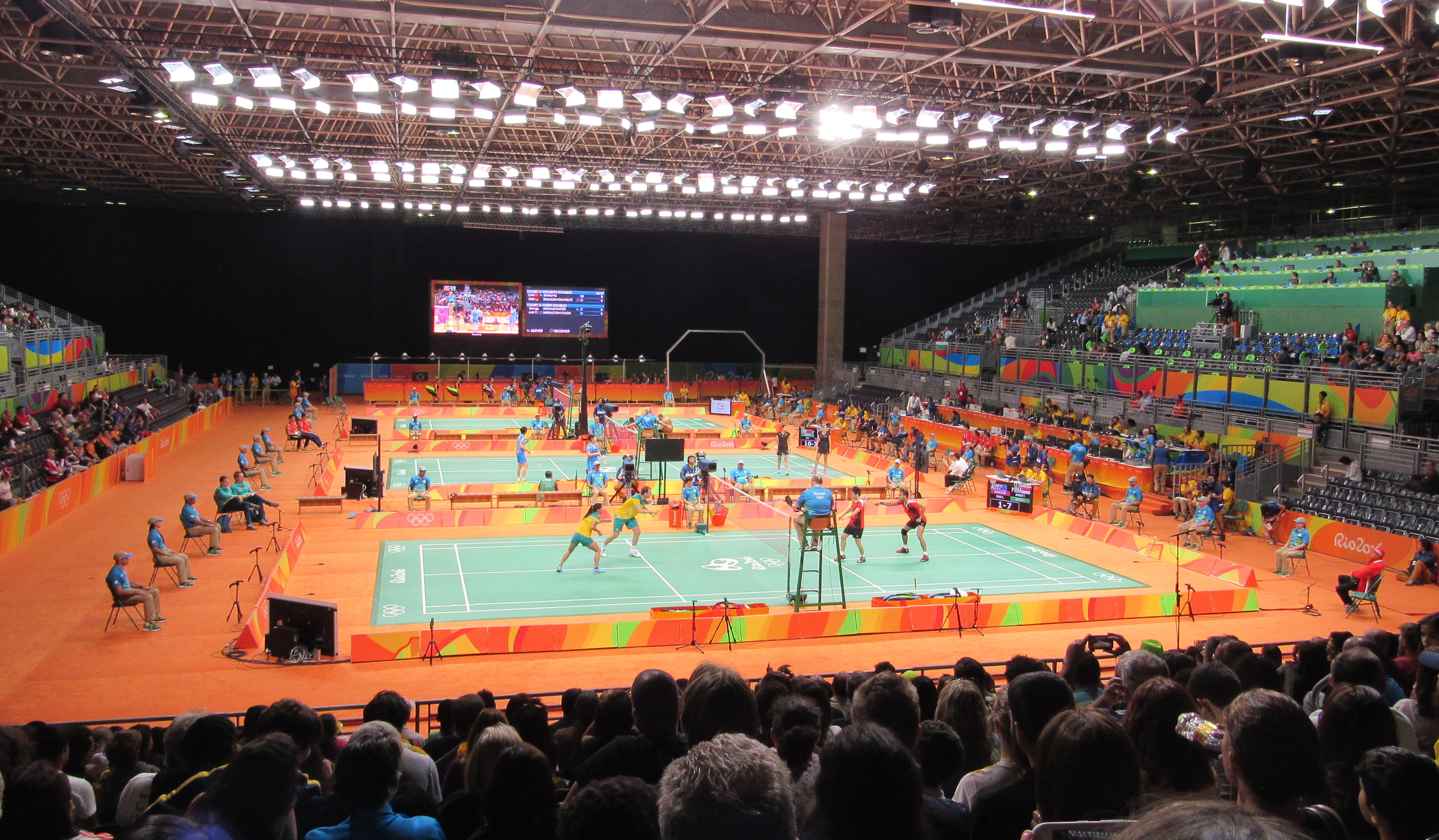

Personal information
- Full name: Leanne Nyuk Lian Choo 周玉蓮
- Born: 5 June 1991 (age 35) Ashford, Adelaide, South Australia
- Height: 1.67 m (5 ft 6 in)
- Weight: 55 kg (121 lb)

Sport
- Country: Australia
- Sport: Badminton
- Handedness: Left

Women's & mixed doubles
- Highest ranking: 22
- BWF profile
Medal record
Women's badminton
Representing Australia
Oceania Championships
Gold medal – first place	2016 Papeete	Mixed doubles
Gold medal – first place	2015 North Harbour	Women's doubles
Gold medal – first place	2015 North Harbour	Mixed doubles
Gold medal – first place	2012 Ballarat	Women's doubles
Gold medal – first place	2010 Invercargill	Women's doubles
Silver medal – second place	2018 Hamilton	Women's doubles
Silver medal – second place	2018 Hamilton	Mixed doubles
Silver medal – second place	2012 Ballarat	Mixed doubles
Bronze medal – third place	2010 Invercargill	Women's singles
Bronze medal – third place	2010 Invercargill	Mixed doubles
Oceania Mixed Team Championships
Gold medal – first place	2016 Auckland	Mixed team
Gold medal – first place	2010 Invercargill	Mixed team
Silver medal – second place	2008 Nouméa	Mixed team
Oceania Women's Team Championships
Gold medal – first place	2018 Hamilton	Women's team
Gold medal – first place	2016 Auckland	Women's team
Gold medal – first place	2010 Invercargill	Women's team
Silver medal – second place	2008 Nouméa	Women's team

Leanne Choo (born 5 June 1991) is a badminton player from Australia. She represented Australia at the 2012 Summer Olympics, alongside former women's doubles partner, Renuga Veeran. Choo also competed at the 2016 Summer Olympics.

== Personal ==
Leanne Choo, nicknamed Choo, was born in Adelaide, South Australia. She attended Glen Osmond Primary School and graduated from Glenunga International High School. In 2010, she enrolled at the University of Adelaide to pursue a degree in architecture and is now pursuing a degree in neuroscience.

Choo is a member of the Sturt Badminton Club in South Australia.

== Career ==
=== Early career – 2012 ===
Choo started playing badminton when she was eight years old. She rose to prominence as a junior, becoming the first South Australian to win a triple crown at a national event. Due to her ongoing success, she was made a member of the Australian National Team. As a member of the national team, she is based at the Melbourne Sports and Aquatic Centre, in Melbourne, Victoria.

Choo has represented Australia multiple times including at the 2006, 2007 and 2009 BWF World Junior Championships. She continued representing Australia at a junior level at the 2007 Australian Youth Olympic Festival in Sydney and the 2008 Commonwealth Youth Games in Pune, India. Her senior debut was at the 2010 Uber Cup in Kuala Lumpur, Malaysia. She also competed at the 2012 edition in Wuhan, China. Choo has also represented Australia at the World Mixed Team Championships, the Sudirman Cup in 2011 and 2015.

At the 2010 Commonwealth Games in Delhi, India, Choo began her partnership with Renuga Veeran. The pair almost staged an upset in the quarterfinals against the number one seeds from Singapore, Yao Lei and Shinta Mulia Sari. This was the first international tournament in which Choo and Veeran competed. The duo officially formed their partnership soon afterwards.

Choo and Veeran competed at the 2011 BWF World Championships in London where they reached the second round. The pair demolished Steffi Annys and Severine Corvilain of Germany 21–6, 21–9 in the first round before losing to 10th seeds, and eventual bronze medalists of the 2012 Summer Olympics, Valeria Sorokina and Nina Vislova of Russia in three games.

==== 2012 Summer Olympics ====
Choo was part of Australia's badminton team contingent at the 2012 Summer Olympics in London, her Olympic debut as a 21-year-old. At the end of the Olympic qualifying period, Choo and Veeran were ranked 35th in the world. During the qualifying process, their ranking peaked at 26. At the 2012 Summer Olympics, Choo and Veeran performed well in their round robin matches, thrashing their South African opponents and staying in contention with their Korean and Indonesian opponents, ranked world number three end eight respectively at the time. Unfortunately, they placed third in their pool and could not advance to the quarterfinals.

However, four pairs, including Meiliana Jauhari and Greysia Polii of Indonesia, and Ha Jung Eun and Kim Min Jung of Korea, were disqualified from the competition. The pairings were disqualified for "not using one's best efforts to win a match" and "conducting oneself in a manner that is clearly abusive or detrimental to the sport" as they were intentionally trying to lose matches in order to secure an easier quarterfinal draw.

Choo and Veeran therefore advanced to the quarterfinals, where they were defeated by Alex Bruce and Michelle Li of Canada. They finished in 5th place, the best result in Australia's history of Olympic badminton.

Results from 2012 Summer Olympics

Round	Date	Opponent	Score	Result
Group C Pool Match 1	28 July 2012	(Indonesia) Meiliana Jauhari (Indonesia) Greysia Polii	21–0 21–0 (DSQ) (11–21 21–19 14–21)	Win
Group C Pool Match 2	29 July 2012	(South Africa) Michelle Claire Edwards (South Africa) Annari Viljoen	21–9 21–7	Win
Group C Pool Match 2	30 July 2012	(South Korea) Ha Jung Eun (South Korea) Kim Min Jung	21–0 21–0 (DSQ) (7–21 19–21)	Win
Quarterfinals	1 August 2012	(Canada) Alex Bruce (Canada) Michelle Li	9–21 21–18 18–21	Loss

=== 2014 – present ===
In April 2014, Choo formed her partnership with Robin Middleton in mixed doubles. In June 2016, the pair qualified for the 2016 Rio Summer Olympics. She also competed at the 2018 Commonwealth Games, in both the women's doubles, with Veeran, and the mixed team.

== Achievements ==
=== Oceania Championships ===
Women's singles
Year	Venue	Opponent	Score	Result
2010	Stadium Southland; Invercargill	(Australia) Chia Chi Huang	7–21, 8–21	Bronze

Women's doubles
Year	Venue	Partner	Opponent	Score	Result
2018	Eastlink Badminton Stadium; Hamilton, New Zealand	(Australia) Renuga Veeran	(Australia) Setyana Mapasa (Australia) Gronya Somerville	14–21, 20–22	Silver
2015	X-TRM North Harbour Badminton Centre; Auckland, New Zealand	(Australia) Gronya Somerville	(Australia) Talia Saunders (Australia) Jennifer Tam	21–14, 21–11	Gold
2012	Ken Kay Badminton Stadium; Victoria, Australia	(Australia) Renuga Veeran	(Australia) Ann-Louise Slee (Australia) Eugenia Tanaka	21–16, 21–13	Gold
2010	Stadium Southland; Invercargill, New Zealand	(Australia) Kate Wilson-Smith	(Australia) Leisha Cooper (Australia) Ann-Louise Slee	22–20, 21–11	Gold

Mixed doubles
Year	Venue	Partner	Opponent	Score	Result
2018	Eastlink Badminton Stadium; Hamilton, New Zealand	(Australia) Matthew Chau	(Australia) Sawan Serasinghe (Australia) Setyana Mapasa	19–21, 18–21	Silver
2016	Punaauia University Hall; Papeete, Tahiti	(Australia) Robin Middleton	(Australia) Anthony Joe (Australia) Joy Lai	21–11, 21–9	Gold
2015	X-TRM North Harbour Badminton Centre; Auckland, New Zealand	(Australia) Robin Middleton	(New Zealand) Oliver Leydon-Davis (New Zealand) Danielle Tahuri	21–12, 21–14	Gold
2012	Ken Kay Badminton Stadium; Victoria, Australia	(Australia) Glenn Warfe	(Australia) Raymond Tam (Australia) Eugenia Tanaka	17–21, 19–21	Silver
2010	Stadium Southland; Invercargill, New Zealand	(Australia) Chad Whitehead	(New Zealand) Henry Tam (New Zealand) Donna Haliday	17–21, 24–22, 14–21	Bronze

=== BWF International Challenge/Series ===
Women's doubles
Year	Tournament	Partner	Opponent	Score	Result
2018	North Harbour International	(Australia) Renuga Veeran	(New Zealand) Sally Fu (New Zealand) Susannah Leydon-Davis	21–6, 21–12	(gold) Winner
2017	Yonex / K&D Graphics International	(Australia) Renuga Veeran	(Canada) Rachel Honderich (Canada) Kristen Tsai	12–21, 15–21	(silver) Runner-up
2017	Jamaica International	(Canada) Rachel Honderich	(Jamaica) Mikaylia Haldane (Jamaica) Katherine Wynter	21–2, 21–8	(gold) Winner
2014	Auckland International	(Australia) Gronya Somerville	(Chinese Taipei) Chang Ching-hui (Chinese Taipei) Chang Hsin-tien	11–6, 8–11, 10–11, 9–11	(silver) Runner-up
2014	Victorian International	(Australia) Renuga Veeran	(Indonesia) Keshya Nurvita Hanadia (Indonesia) Devi Tika Permatasari	13–21, 11–21	(silver) Runner-up
2011	Altona International	(Australia) Renuga Veeran	(New Zealand) Amanda Brown (New Zealand) Stephanie Cheng	22–20, 21–11	(gold) Winner
2010	Altona International	(Australia) Kate Wilson-Smith	(Australia) He Tian Tang (Australia) Renuga Veeran	15–21, 15–21	(silver) Runner-up
2010	Tahiti International	(Australia) Kate Wilson-Smith	(Germany) Nicole Grether (Canada) Charmaine Reid	21–12, 19–21, 21–12	(gold) Winner

Mixed doubles
Year	Tournament	Partner	Opponent	Score	Result
2015	Sydney International	(Australia) Robin Middleton	(United States) Phillip Chew (United States) Jamie Subandhi	21–8, 21–17	(gold) Winner
2015	Maribyrnong International	(Australia) Robin Middleton	(Australia) Sawan Serasinghe (Australia) Setyana Mapasa	17–21, 21–19, 21–19	(gold) Winner
2015	Sri Lanka International	(Australia) Robin Middleton	(India) Arun Vishnu (India) Aparna Balan	21–15, 17–21, 13–21	(silver) Runner-up
2011	Brazil International	(Australia) Glenn Warfe	(United States) Halim Ho (United States) Eva Lee	11–21, 15–21	(silver) Runner-up
2011	Altona International	(Australia) Glenn Warfe	(New Zealand) Kevin Dennerly-Minturn (New Zealand) Stephanie Cheng	22–20, 21–11	(gold) Winner
2010	Tahiti International	(Australia) Glenn Warfe	(Australia) Ross Smith (Australia) Kate Wilson-Smith	14–21, 21–13, 18–21	(silver) Runner-up

BWF International Challenge tournament
BWF International Series tournament
BWF Future Series tournament
