= Eugenia Tanaka =

Indonesian-born Australian badminton player

Personal information
- Nickname: U.G.
- Born: 9 March 1987 (age 39) Kisaran, North Sumatra, Indonesia
- Height: 1.57 m (5 ft 2 in)
- Weight: 56 kg (123 lb)

Sport
- Country: Australia
- Sport: Badminton
- Coached by: Ricky Yu
- BWF profile
Medal record
Badminton
Representing Australia
Oceania Championships
Gold medal – first place	2012 Ballarat	Mixed doubles
Silver medal – second place	2012 Ballarat	Women's doubles
Bronze medal – third place	2008 Nouméa	Women's doubles
Oceania Mixed Team Championships
Gold medal – first place	2012 Ballarat	Mixed team
Gold medal – first place	2010 Invercargill	Mixed team
Silver medal – second place	2008 Nouméa	Mixed team
Oceania Women's Team Championships
Gold medal – first place	2012 Ballarat	Women's team
Gold medal – first place	2010 Invercargill	Women's team
Silver medal – second place	2008 Nouméa	Women's team

Eugenia Tanaka (born 9 March 1987 in Kisaran, North Sumatra, Indonesia) is an Indonesian-born Australian badminton player. At the age of fourteen, Tanaka moved to Melbourne, Australia, where she started playing badminton. Tanaka is also a member of Badminton Academy of Victoria, and is coached and trained by Ricky Yu.

Tanaka qualified for the women's doubles at the 2008 Summer Olympics in Beijing, by placing fifteenth and receiving a continental spot for Oceania from the Badminton World Federation's ranking list. Tanaka and her partner Tania Luiz lost the preliminary round match to Japanese pair Miyuki Maeda and Satoko Suetsuna, with a score of 4–21 and 8–21.

== Achievements ==
=== Oceania Championships ===
Women's doubles
Year	Venue	Partner	Opponent	Score	Result
2012	Ken Kay Badminton Stadium; Ballarat, Australia	(Australia) Ann-Louise Slee	(Australia) Leanne Choo (Australia) Renuga Veeran	16–21, 13–21	Silver
2008	Nouméa, New Caledonia	(Australia) Tania Luiz	(New Zealand) Michelle Chan (New Zealand) Rachel Hindley	10–21, 10–21	Bronze

Mixed doubles
Year	Venue	Partner	Opponent	Score	Result
2012	Ken Kay Badminton Stadium; Ballarat, Australia	(Australia) Raymond Tam	(Australia) Glenn Warfe (Australia) Leanne Choo	21–17, 21–19	Gold

=== BWF International Challenge/Series ===
Women's doubles
Year	Tournament	Partner	Opponent	Score	Result
2008	Miami Pan Am International	(Australia) Tania Luiz	(Peru) Cristina Aicardi (Peru) Claudia Rivero	21–13, 21–13	(gold) Winner
2008	Peru International	(Australia) Tania Luiz	(Australia) Erin Carroll (Australia) Leisha Cooper	21–23, 21–17, 21–13	(gold) Winner

Mixed doubles
Year	Tournament	Partner	Opponent	Score	Result
2009	Auckland International	(Australia) Chad Whitehead	(Australia) Glenn Warfe (Australia) Renuga Veeran	12–21, 15–21	(silver) Runner-up

BWF International Challenge tournament
BWF International Series tournament
BWF Future Series tournament
