= Stuart Gomez =

Australian badminton player (born 1982)

Stuart Gomez (born 15 November 1982 in Sydney) is a male badminton player from Australia.

Gomez played the 2007 BWF World Championships in men's singles, and was defeated in the first round by Muhammad Hafiz Hashim, of Malaysia, 21–8, 21–7. He represented Australia at the Beijing 2008 Summer Olympics, but was defeated in the first round by Erwin Kehlhoffner, of France, 19–21, 22–20, 21–15.

Gomez is the only Australian men's singles badminton athlete to outright qualify for the Olympics, not needing the Oceania Continental Representation Placing which is often gifted to Australians as New Zealand require that their athletes are "capable of achieving a top 16 placing at the Games in the Individual Event, with the potential to win an Olympic Diploma (top 8 placing)".

He is also the last Australian men's singles Olympian to qualify for the Olympics with no Australian qualifying for 2012 London Olympics or 2016 Rio Olympics.

Gomez represented Australia in the 2000, 2002, 2004, 2006, 2008 and 2010 Thomas Cup as well as the 2005 and 2007 Sudirman Cup.
