= Raymond Tam (badminton) =

Australian badminton player (born 1986)

Raymond Tam 谭家豪
Personal information
- Born: 20 October 1986 (age 40) Hong Kong

Sport
- Country: Australia
- Sport: Badminton

Men's & mixed doubles
- Highest ranking: 44 (MD 16 October 2014); 71 (XD 20 February 2014)
- BWF profile
Medal record
Men's badminton
Representing Australia
Oceania Championships
Gold medal – first place	2012 Ballarat	Mixed doubles
Gold medal – first place	2014 Ballarat	Men's doubles
Bronze medal – third place	2014 Ballarat	Mixed doubles
Bronze medal – third place	2019 Melbourne	Men's doubles
Bronze medal – third place	2020 Ballarat	Men's doubles
Bronze medal – third place	2020 Ballarat	Mixed doubles
Oceania Mixed Team Championships
Gold medal – first place	2012 Ballarat	Mixed team
Gold medal – first place	2014 Ballarat	Mixed team
Oceania Men's Team Championships
Gold medal – first place	2018 Hamilton	Men's team
Silver medal – second place	2012 Ballarat	Men's team

Raymond Tam (born 20 October 1986) is an Australian badminton player and is currently top of the Badminton Australia men's doubles rankings. Tam was born in Hong Kong, and immigrated to Australia with his father when he was 3 years old. He competed for Australia at the 2014 Commonwealth Games. Tam was educated at Newington College (1995–2004) and lives in Sydney. He was the champion at the Oceania Badminton Championships in 2012 in the mixed doubles event, and in 2014 in the men's doubles event.

== Achievements ==
=== Oceania Championships ===
Men's doubles
Year	Venue	Partner	Opponent	Score	Result
2020	Ken Kay Badminton Stadium; Ballarat, Australia	(Australia) Lukas Defolky	(Australia) Matthew Chau (Australia) Sawan Serasinghe	10–21, 17–21	Bronze
2019	Melbourne Sports and Aquatic Centre; Melbourne, Australia	(Australia) Lukas Defolky	(Australia) Simon Leung (Australia) Mitchell Wheller	12–21, 6–21	Bronze
2014	Ken Kay Badminton Stadium; Ballarat, Australia	(Australia) Glenn Warfe	(Australia) Matthew Chau (Australia) Sawan Serasinghe	21–11, 21–13	Gold

Mixed doubles
Year	Venue	Partner	Opponent	Score	Result
2020	Ken Kay Badminton Stadium; Ballarat, Australia	(Australia) Jessica Lim	(Australia) Simon Leung (Australia) Gronya Somerville	12–21, 14–21	Bronze
2014	Ken Kay Badminton Stadium; Ballarat, Australia	(Australia) Gronya Somerville	(New Zealand) Oliver Leydon-Davis (New Zealand) Susannah Leydon-Davis	19–21, 19–21	Bronze
2012	Ken Kay Badminton Stadium; Ballarat, Australia	(Australia) Eugenia Tanaka	(Australia) Glenn Warfe (Australia) Leanne Choo	21–17, 21–19	Gold

=== BWF International Challenge/Series (1 title, 5 runners-up) ===
Men's doubles
Year	Tournament	Partner	Opponent	Score	Result
2014	Maribyrnong International	(Australia) Glenn Warfe	(Malaysia) Jagdish Singh (Malaysia) Roni Tan Wee Long	14–21, 19–21	(silver) Runner-up
2013	Victorian International	(Australia) Glenn Warfe	(Australia) Robin Middleton (Australia) Ross Smith	19–21, 21–19, 17–21	(silver) Runner-up
2013	Auckland International	(Australia) Glenn Warfe	(Australia) Robin Middleton (Australia) Ross Smith	16–21, 8–21	(silver) Runner-up
2011	Counties Manukau International	(Australia) Wesley Caulkett	(New Zealand) Daniel Shirley (England) Andrew Smith	12–21, 10–21	(silver) Runner-up
2011	Fiji International	(Australia) Wesley Caulkett	(Australia) Michael Fariman (Australia) Pit Seng Low	21–8, 21–13	(gold) Winner

Mixed doubles
Year	Tournament	Partner	Opponent	Score	Result
2013	Auckland International	(Australia) Gronya Somerville	(Australia) Ross Smith (Australia) Renuga Veeran	16–21, 12–21	(silver) Runner-up

BWF International Series tournament
BWF Future Series tournament
