= Tara Pilven =

Australian badminton player

Personal information
- Born: 2 August 1993 (age 32) Ballarat, Australia

Sport
- Country: Australia
- Sport: Badminton

Women's singles
- Highest ranking: 85 (20 November 2014)
Medal record
Badminton
Representing Australia
Oceania Championships
Bronze medal – third place	2014 Ballarat	Women's singles
Bronze medal – third place	2014 Ballarat	Women's doubles
Oceania Junior Championships
Gold medal – first place	2011 Fiji	Women's singles
Bronze medal – third place	2011 Fiji	Women's doubles

Tara Pilven (born 2 August 1993) is a retired Australian badminton player who competed at international level events. She is a four-time Oceanian medalist and has competed at the 2010 Summer Youth Olympics.
