= 2007 Sudirman Cup knockout stage =

The knockout stage of the 2007 Sudirman Cup was the final stage of the competition, following the group stage, held from 14 to 17 June 2007.

== Qualified teams ==
Level	Group	Winners	Runners-up	Third place	Fourth place
1	A	China	England	Malaysia	Thailand
1	B	Indonesia	South Korea	Denmark	Hong Kong
2	A	Singapore	Chinese Taipei	Germany	Sweden
2	B	Japan	Poland	Netherlands	Russia
3	A	France	United States	Ukraine	Canada
3	B	India	Scotland	New Zealand	Finland
4	A	Australia	Italy	Wales	Spain
4	B	Czech Republic	Bulgaria	Switzerland	Estonia
5	A	Lithuania	Slovenia	South Africa	Luxembourg
5	B	Ireland	Sri Lanka	Peru	Norway
6	A	Portugal	Slovakia	Turkey	Latvia
6	B	Belgium	Belarus	Iceland	Cyprus

== Brackets ==
=== Level 1 ===
Semi-finals
China	3
South Korea	0
England	2
Indonesia	3

Final
China	3
Indonesia	0

Fifth place match
Malaysia	2
Denmark	3

Seventh place match
Thailand	2
Hong Kong	3

=== Level 2 ===
Ninth place match
Singapore	2
Japan	3

Eleventh place match
Chinese Taipei	1
Poland	3

Thirteenth place match
Germany	3
Netherlands	0

Fifteenth place match
Sweden	1
Russia	3

=== Level 3 ===
Seventeenth place match
France	3
India	0

Nineteenth place match
United States	0
Scotland	3

Twenty-first place match
Canada	1
New Zealand	3

Twenty-third place match
Ukraine	1
Finland	3

=== Level 4 ===
Twenty-fifth place match
Australia	2
Czech Republic	3

Twenty-seventh place match
Italy	3
Bulgaria	1

Twenty-ninth place match
Wales	2
Switzerland	3

Thirty-first place match
Spain	0
Estonia	3

=== Level 5 ===
Thirty-third place match
Lithuania	1
Ireland	3

Thirty-fifth place match
Slovenia	3
Sri Lanka	1

Thirty-seventh place match
South Africa	3
Peru	2

Thirty-ninth place match
Luxembourg	3
Norway	2

=== Level 6 ===
Forty-first place match
Portugal	3
Belgium	1

Forty-third place match
Slovakia	2
Belarus	3

Forty-fifth place match
Turkey	0
Iceland	3

Forty-seventh place match
Latvia	1
Cyprus	3

== Classification round ==
=== Forty-seventh place match: Latvia vs. Cyprus ===
Latvia
1
Scotstoun Stadium, Court 7
15 June 2007, 09:30 UTC+0

Cyprus
3

			1	2	3
1	(Latvia) (Cyprus)	Guntis Lavrinovičs / Madara Puķīte; Dometia Ioannou / Vasilis Vasou	17; 21	10; 21
2	(Latvia) (Cyprus)	Raimonds Cipe; Dimitris Kyprianou	17; 21	18; 21
3	(Latvia) (Cyprus)	Kristīne Šefere; Maria Ioannou	21; 12	10; 21	22; 20
4	(Latvia) (Cyprus)	Raimonds Cipe / Guntis Lavrinovičs; Dimitris Kyprianou / Vasilis Vasou	11; 21	21; 18	18; 21
5	(Latvia) (Cyprus)	Margarita Miķelsone / Kristīne Šefere; Dometia Ioannou / Maria Ioannou				not played

=== Forty-fifth place match: Turkey vs. Iceland ===
Turkey
0
Scotstoun Stadium, Court 6
15 June 2007, 09:30 UTC+0

Iceland
3

			1	2	3
1	(Turkey) (Iceland)	Mustafa Yalvarici; Helgi Jóhannesson				w/o
2	(Turkey) (Iceland)	Nursel Aydoğmuş; Ragna Ingólfsdóttir	13; 21	15; 21
3	(Turkey) (Iceland)	Ali Kaya / Göksel Kundakçı; Atli Jóhannesson / Helgi Jóhannesson				w/o
4	(Turkey) (Iceland)	Derya Çalımbay / Nur Damia Özer; Katrín Atladóttir / Ragna Ingólfsdóttir				not played
5	(Turkey) (Iceland)	Ali Kaya / Nursel Aydoğmuş; Atli Jóhannesson / Tinna Helgadóttir				not played

=== Forty-third place match: Slovakia vs. Belarus ===
Slovakia
2
Scotstoun Stadium, Court 7
15 June 2007, 13:30 UTC+0

Belarus
3

			1	2	3
1	(Slovakia) (Belarus)	Michal Matejka; Yauheni Yakauchuk	21; 19	21; 13
2	(Slovakia) (Belarus)	Eva Sládeková; Olga Konon	15; 21	1; 21
3	(Slovakia) (Belarus)	Marian Smrek / Marian Sulko; Andrei Konakh / Yauheni Yakauchuk	21; 15	14; 21	15; 21
4	(Slovakia) (Belarus)	Kvetoslava Orlovská / Zuzana Orlovská; Maria Kizit / Alesia Zaitsava	21; 18	21; 17
5	(Slovakia) (Belarus)	Marian Sulko / Zuzana Orlovskà; Andrei Konakh / Olga Konon	5; 21	21; 23

=== Forty-first place match: Portugal vs. Belgium ===
Portugal
3
Scotstoun Stadium, Court 6
15 June 2007, 13:30 UTC+0

Belgium
1

			1	2	3
1	(Portugal) (Belgium)	Marco Vasconcelos; Yuhan Tan	21; 12	21; 15
2	(Portugal) (Belgium)	Telma Santos; Nathalie Descamps	25; 21	21; 21
3	(Portugal) (Belgium)	Alexandre Paixão / Marco Vasconcelos; Wouter Claes / Frédéric Mawet	19; 21	14; 21
4	(Portugal) (Belgium)	Filipa Lamy / Telma Santos; Steffi Annys / Severine Corvilain	21; 14	24; 22
5	(Portugal) (Belgium)	Alexandre Paixão / Filipa Lamy; Wouter Claes / Nathalie Descamps				not played

=== Thirty-ninth place match: Luxembourg vs. Norway ===
Luxembourg
3
Scotstoun Stadium, Court 3
15 June 2007, 09:30 UTC+0

Norway
2

			1	2	3
1	(Luxembourg) (Norway)	Yves Olinger / Claudie Barnig; Erik Rundle / Helene Trommestad	16; 21	22; 20	23; 21
2	(Luxembourg) (Norway)	Mathieu Serebriakoff; Steinar Klausen	14; 21	10; 21
3	(Luxembourg) (Norway)	Hariati; Sara Blengsli Kværnø	21; 15	21; 17
4	(Luxembourg) (Norway)	Joel Fischbach / Ben Speltz; Lorentz Aarhus / Steinar Klausen	12; 21	15; 21
5	(Luxembourg) (Norway)	Claudine Barnig / Zoe Schroeder; Ida Sandberg / Marthe Sandberg	21; 11	21; 15

=== Thirty-seventh place match: South Africa vs. Peru ===
South Africa
3
Scotstoun Stadium, Court 2
15 June 2007, 09:30 UTC+0

Peru
2

			1	2	3
1	(South Africa) (Peru)	Stacey Doubell; Claudia Rivero	7; 21	11; 21
2	(South Africa) (Peru)	Chris Dednam / Roelof Dednam; Javier Jimeno / Rodrigo Pacheco	21; 18	21; 6
3	(South Africa) (Peru)	Michelle Claire Edwards / Annari Viljoen; Jie Meng / Valeria Rivero	16; 21	21; 17	17; 21
4	(South Africa) (Peru)	Willem Viljoen; Andrés Corpancho	9; 21	21; 17	21; 16
5	(South Africa) (Peru)	Dorian James / Michelle Claire Edwards; Rodrigo Pacheco / Claudia Rivero	22; 20	14; 21	21; 19

=== Thirty-fifth place match: Slovenia vs. Sri Lanka ===
Slovenia
3
Scotstoun Stadium, Court 5
15 June 2007, 09:30 UTC+0

Sri Lanka
1

			1	2	3
1	(Slovenia) (Sri Lanka)	Luka Petrič; Niluka Karunaratne	11; 21	12; 21
2	(Slovenia) (Sri Lanka)	Maja Tvrdy; Nadeesha Gayanthi	21; 6	21; 7
3	(Slovenia) (Sri Lanka)	Luka Kumelj / Luka Petrič; Diluka Karunaratne / Dinuka Karunaratne	21; 16	21; 19
4	(Slovenia) (Sri Lanka)	Maja Kersnik / Maja Tvrdy; Chandrika de Silva / Nadeesha Gayanthi	21; 18	21; 17
5	(Slovenia) (Sri Lanka)	Luka Kumelj / Maja Kersnik; Niluka Karunaratne / Chandrika de Silva				not played

=== Thirty-third place match: Lithuania vs. Ireland ===
Lithuania
1
Scotstoun Stadium, Court 4
15 June 2007, 09:30 UTC+0

Ireland
3

			1	2	3
1	(Lithuania) (Republic of Ireland)	Akvilė Stapušaitytė; Chloe Magee	21; 19	17; 21	12; 21
2	(Lithuania) (Republic of Ireland)	Kęstutis Navickas; Scott Evans	21; 18	16; 21	21; 17
3	(Lithuania) (Republic of Ireland)	Akvilė Stapušaitytė / Ligita Žukauskaitė; Bing Huang / Chloe Magee	16; 21	21; 16	8; 21
4	(Lithuania) (Republic of Ireland)	Donatas Narvilas / Kęstutis Navickas; Daniel Magee / Sam Magee	17; 21	21; 18	19; 21
5	(Lithuania) (Republic of Ireland)	Tomas Dovydaitis / Ligita Žukauskaitė; Scott Evans / Bing Huang				not played

=== Thirty-first place match: Spain vs. Estonia ===
Spain
0
Scotstoun Stadium, Court 7
14 June 2007, 13:30 UTC+0

Estonia
3

			1	2	3
1	(Spain) (Estonia)	Pablo Abián; Raul Must	12; 21	21; 10	15; 21
2	(Spain) (Estonia)	Lucia Tavera; Kati Tolmoff	12; 21	10; 21
3	(Spain) (Estonia)	Pablo Abián / Carlos Longo; Ants Mängel / Raul Must	16; 21	21; 16	22; 24
4	(Spain) (Estonia)	Sandra Chirlaque / Lucia Tavera; Helena Reina / Kai-Riin Saluste				not played
5	(Spain) (Estonia)	Carlos Longo / Laura Molina; Ants Mängel / Karoliine Hõim				not played

=== Twenty-ninth place match: Wales vs. Switzerland ===
Wales
2
Scotstoun Stadium, Court 6
14 June 2007, 13:30 UTC+0

Switzerland
3

			1	2	3
1	(Wales) (Switzerland)	Martyn Lewis; Christian Bösiger	21; 14	17; 21	21; 17
2	(Wales) (Switzerland)	Joe Morgan / James Philips; Michael Andrey / Anthony Dumartheray	21; 18	21; 11
3	(Wales) (Switzerland)	Harreit Johnson / Rachele Phillips; Sabrina Jaquet / Corinne Jörg	24; 26	21; 14	20; 22
4	(Wales) (Switzerland)	Vikki Jones; Monika Fisher	13; 21	9; 21
5	(Wales) (Switzerland)	Martyn Lewis / Rachele Phillips; Anthony Dumartheray / Sabrina Jaquet	21; 12	14; 21	19; 21

=== Twenty-seventh place match: Italy vs. Bulgaria ===
Italy
3
Scotstoun Stadium, Court 5
14 June 2007, 13:30 UTC+0

Bulgaria
1

			1	2	3
1	(Italy) (Bulgaria)	Klaus Raffeiner; Krasimir Yankov	17; 21	25; 23	23; 21
2	(Italy) (Bulgaria)	Agnese Allegrini; Linda Zetchiri	21; 15	21; 13
3	(Italy) (Bulgaria)	Enrico Galeani / Rosario Maddaloni; Stiliyan Makarski / Vladimir Metodiev	17; 21	16; 21
4	(Italy) (Bulgaria)	Agnese Allegrini / Hui Ding; Gabriela Banova / Dimitria Popstoikova	20; 22	21; 15	21; 12
5	(Italy) (Bulgaria)	Klaus Raffeiner / Hui Ding; Vladimir Metodiev / Diana Dimova				not played

=== Twenty-fifth place match: Australia vs. Czech Republic ===
Australia
2
Scotstoun Stadium, Court 6
14 June 2007, 09:30 UTC+0

Czech Republic
3

			1	2	3
1	(Australia) (Czech Republic)	Jeff Tho; Jan Fröhlich	11; 21	21; 17	16; 21
2	(Australia) (Czech Republic)	Huang Chia-chi; Martina Benešová	21; 12	21; 7
3	(Australia) (Czech Republic)	Ross Smith / Glenn Warfe; Petr Koukal / Jan Vondra	15; 21	16; 21
4	(Australia) (Czech Republic)	Huang Chia-chi / Tania Luiz; Martina Benešová / Kristína Ludíková	27; 25	21; 17
5	(Australia) (Czech Republic)	Ross Smith / Tania Luiz; Jan Fröhlich / Kristína Ludíková	15; 21	21; 17	13; 21

=== Twenty-third place match: Ukraine vs. Finland ===
Ukraine
1
Scotstoun Stadium, Court 6
15 June 2007, 18:30 UTC+0

Finland
3

			1	2	3
1	(Ukraine) (Finland)	Dmytro Zavadsky; Ville Lång	13; 21	13; 21
2	(Ukraine) (Finland)	Larisa Griga; Anu Nieminen	18; 21	10; 21
3	(Ukraine) (Finland)	Valeriy Atrashchenkov / Vladislav Druzchenko; Tuomas Nuorteva / Mikko Vikman	21; 15	21; 15
4	(Ukraine) (Finland)	Natalia Golovkina / Elena Prus; Anu Nieminen / Maria Väisänen	21; 23	21; 19	17; 21
5	(Ukraine) (Finland)	Vladislav Druzchenko / Elena Nozdran; Ville Lång / Maria Väisänen				not played

=== Twenty-first place match: Canada vs. New Zealand ===
Canada
1
Scotstoun Stadium, Court 5
15 June 2007, 18:30 UTC+0

New Zealand
3

			1	2	3
1	(Canada) (New Zealand)	Mike Beres / Valerie Loker; Daniel Shirley / Renee Flavell	21; 13	18; 21	10; 21
2	(Canada) (New Zealand)	Andrew Dabeka; John Moody	18; 21	21; 13	15; 21
3	(Canada) (New Zealand)	Anna Rice; Michelle Chan	21; 11	18; 21	21; 10
4	(Canada) (New Zealand)	Mike Beres / William Milroy; John Gordon / Daniel Shirley	11; 21	21; 19	17; 21
5	(Canada) (New Zealand)	Fiona McKee / Charmaine Reid; Renee Flavell / Rachel Hindley				not played

=== Nineteenth place match: United States vs. Scotland ===
United States
0
Scotstoun Stadium, Court 2
15 June 2007, 18:30 UTC+0

Scotland
3

			1	2	3
1	(United States) (Scotland)	Khan Malaythong / Mesinee Mangkalakiri; Watson Briggs / Imogen Bankier	10; 21	22; 24
2	(United States) (Scotland)	Nicholas Jinadasa; Craig Goddard	15; 21	12; 21
3	(United States) (Scotland)	Eva Lee; Susan Hughes	8; 21	15; 21
4	(United States) (Scotland)	Howard Bach / Khan Malaythong; Andrew Bowman / Watson Briggs				not played
5	(United States) (Scotland)	Eva Lee / Mesinee Mangkalakiri; Yuan Wemyss / Emma Mason				not played

=== Seventeenth place match: France vs. India ===
France
3
Scotstoun Stadium, Court 3
15 June 2007, 18:30 UTC+0

India
0

			1	2	3
1	(France) (India)	Svetoslav Stoyanov / Élodie Eymard; Valiyaveetil Diju / Aparna Balan	19; 21	21; 19	21; 17
2	(France) (India)	Pi Hongyan; Saina Nehwal	21; 16	15; 21	21; 9
3	(France) (India)	Erwin Kehlhoffner; Anup Sridhar	11; 21	21; 11	21; 17
4	(France) (India)	Mihail Popov / Svetoslav Stoyanov; Rupesh Kumar K. T. / Sanave Thomas				not played
5	(France) (India)	Élodie Eymard / Weny Rahmawati; Aparna Balan / Saina Nehwal				not played

=== Fifteenth place match: Sweden vs. Russia ===
Sweden
1
Scotstoun Stadium, Court 2
15 June 2007, 13:30 UTC+0

Russia
3

			1	2	3
1	(Sweden) (Russia)	Henri Hurskainen / Johanna Persson; Aleksandr Nikolaenko / Nina Vislova	12; 21	16; 21
2	(Sweden) (Russia)	Magnus Sahlberg; Sergey Ivlev	21; 18	21; 18
3	(Sweden) (Russia)	Sara Persson; Ella Karachkova	19; 21	21; 19	16; 21
4	(Sweden) (Russia)	Henri Hurskainen / Magnus Sahlberg; Vitalij Durkin / Aleksandr Nikolaenko	16; 21	19; 21
5	(Sweden) (Russia)	Elin Bergblom / Johanna Persson; Valeria Sorokina / Nina Vislova				not played

=== Thirteenth place match: Germany vs. Netherlands ===
Germany
3
Scotstoun Stadium, Court 5
15 June 2007, 13:30 UTC+0

Netherlands
0

			1	2	3
1	(Germany) (Netherlands)	Kristof Hopp / Birgit Overzier; Ruud Bosch / Paulien van Dooremalen	21; 14	21; 15
2	(Germany) (Netherlands)	Marc Zwiebler; Eric Pang	21; 18	19; 21	21; 17
3	(Germany) (Netherlands)	Huaiwen Xu; Judith Meulendijks	17; 21	22; 20	21; 17
4	(Germany) (Netherlands)	Michael Fuchs / Roman Spitko; Ruud Bosch / Koen Ridder				not played
5	(Germany) (Netherlands)	Nicole Grether / Juliane Schenk; Rachel van Cutsen / Paulien van Dooremalen				not played

=== Eleventh place match: Chinese Taipei vs. Poland ===
Chinese Taipei
1
Scotstoun Stadium, Court 3
15 June 2007, 13:30 UTC+0

Poland
3

			1	2	3
1	(Chinese Taipei) (Poland)	Tsai Chia-hsin / Cheng Shao-chieh; Robert Mateusiak / Nadieżda Kostiuczyk	17; 21	20; 22
2	(Chinese Taipei) (Poland)	Hsieh Yu-hsing; Przemysław Wacha	19; 21	17; 21
3	(Chinese Taipei) (Poland)	Cheng Shao-chieh; Agnieszka Wojtkowska	21; 10	21; 9
4	(Chinese Taipei) (Poland)	Fang Chieh-min / Lee Sheng-mu; Michał Łogosz / Robert Mateusiak	11; 21	15; 21
5	(Chinese Taipei) (Poland)	Cheng Wen-hsing / Chien Yu-chin; Kamila Augustyn / Nadieżda Kostiuczyk				not played

=== Ninth place match: Singapore vs. Japan ===
Singapore
2
Scotstoun Stadium, Court 1
15 June 2007, 18:30 UTC+0

Japan
3

			1	2	3
1	(Singapore) (Japan)	Hendri Saputra / Li Yujia; Keita Masuda / Miyuki Maeda	21; 17	21; 17
2	(Singapore) (Japan)	Ronald Susilo; Kenichi Tago	21; 11	18; 21	20; 22
3	(Singapore) (Japan)	Xing Aiying; Eriko Hirose	11; 21	12; 21
4	(Singapore) (Japan)	Hendri Saputra / Hendra Wijaya; Shintaro Ikeda / Shuichi Sakamoto	22; 20	21; 17
5	(Singapore) (Japan)	Jiang Yanmei / Li Yujia; Kumiko Ogura / Reiko Shiota	21; 10	14; 21	14; 21

=== Seventh place match: Thailand vs. Hong Kong ===
Thailand
2
Scotstoun Stadium, Court 1
15 June 2007, 09:30 UTC+0

Hong Kong
3

			1	2	3
1	(Thailand) (Hong Kong)	Sudket Prapakamol / Saralee Thungthongkam; Albertus Susanto Njoto / Koon Wai Chee	19; 21	21; 17	16; 21
2	(Thailand) (Hong Kong)	Boonsak Ponsana; Chan Yan Kit	21; 4	21; 13
3	(Thailand) (Hong Kong)	Salakjit Ponsana; Yip Pui Yin	15; 21	20; 22
4	(Thailand) (Hong Kong)	Patapol Ngernsrisuk / Sudket Prapakamol; Albertus Susanto Njoto / Yohan Hadikusumo Wiratama	13; 21	21; 18	21; 17
5	(Thailand) (Hong Kong)	Duanganong Aroonkesorn / Kunchala Voravichitchaikul; Chau Hoi Wah / Koon Wai Chee	15; 21	21; 15	20; 22

=== Fifth place match: Malaysia vs. Denmark ===
Malaysia
2
Scotstoun Stadium, Court 1
15 June 2007, 13:30 UTC+0

Denmark
3

			1	2	3
1	(Malaysia) (Denmark)	Lee Chong Wei; Kenneth Jonassen	21; 9	21; 11
2	(Malaysia) (Denmark)	Anita Raj Kaur; Tine Rasmussen	17; 21	10; 21
3	(Malaysia) (Denmark)	Koo Kien Keat / Tan Boon Heong; Jens Eriksen / Martin Lundgaard Hansen	23; 21	21; 16
4	(Malaysia) (Denmark)	Chin Eei Hui / Wong Pei Tty; Lena Frier Kristiansen / Kamilla Rytter Juhl	19; 21	17; 21
5	(Malaysia) (Denmark)	Tan Wee Kiong / Woon Khe Wei; Joachim Fischer Nielsen / Britta Andersen	20; 22	19; 21

== Semi-finals ==
=== China vs. South Korea ===
China
3
Scotstoun Stadium, Court 1
16 June 2007, 12:00 UTC+0

South Korea
0

			1	2	3
1	(China) (South Korea)	Zheng Bo / Gao Ling; Han Sang-hoon / Lee Hyo-jung	21; 17	22; 20
2	(China) (South Korea)	Zhang Ning; Hwang Hye-youn	21; 14	21; 17
3	(China) (South Korea)	Lin Dan; Shon Seung-mo	21; 11	18; 21	21; 14
4	(China) (South Korea)	Zhao Tingting / Yang Wei; Lee Kyung-won / Lee Hyo-jung				not played
5	(China) (South Korea)	Fu Haifeng / Cai Yun; Jung Jae-sung / Lee Jae-jin				not played

=== England vs. Indonesia ===
England
2
Scotstoun Stadium, Court 1
16 June 2007, 17:00 UTC+0

Indonesia
3

			1	2	3
1	(England) (Indonesia)	Nathan Robertson / Gail Emms; Nova Widianto / Liliyana Natsir	22; 20	20; 22	21; 17
2	(England) (Indonesia)	Tracey Hallam; Maria Kristin Yulianti	18; 21	21; 19	21; 18
3	(England) (Indonesia)	Andrew Smith; Taufik Hidayat	20; 22	15; 21
4	(England) (Indonesia)	Gail Emms / Donna Kellogg; Vita Marissa / Greysia Polii	18; 21	16; 21
5	(England) (Indonesia)	Anthony Clark / Robert Blair; Markis Kido / Candra Wijaya	17; 21	14; 21

== Final ==
=== China vs. Indonesia ===
China
3
Scotstoun Stadium, Court 1
17 June 2007, 13:00 UTC+0

Indonesia
0

			1	2	3
1	(China) (Indonesia)	Zheng Bo / Gao Ling; Flandy Limpele / Vita Marissa	19; 21	21; 17	21; 19
2	(China) (Indonesia)	Fu Haifeng / Cai Yun; Markis Kido / Candra Wijaya	21; 11	21; 13
3	(China) (Indonesia)	Zhang Ning; Adriyanti Firdasari	21; 16	21; 8
4	(China) (Indonesia)	Zhao Tingting / Yang Wei; Vita Marissa / Greysia Polii				not played
5	(China) (Indonesia)	Lin Dan; Taufik Hidayat				not played
