= 2007 Sudirman Cup group stage =

The group stage of the 2007 Sudirman Cup was the first stage of the competition. It was held at Scotstoun Stadium in Glasgow, Scotland, from 11 to 14 June.

== Group composition ==
Subgroup	Level 1	Level 2	Level 3	Level 4	Level 5	Level 6
A	China; Malaysia; England; Thailand	Singapore; Germany; Chinese Taipei; Sweden	France; Canada; United States; Ukraine	Australia; Spain; Italy; Wales	Slovenia; Lithuania; South Africa; Luxembourg	Portugal; Slovakia; Turkey; Latvia
B	Denmark; South Korea; Indonesia; Hong Kong	Japan; Poland; Russia; Netherlands	India; Scotland; New Zealand; Finland	Bulgaria; Czech Republic; Switzerland; Estonia	Ireland; Peru; Sri Lanka; Norway	Belgium; Iceland; Cyprus; Belarus

== Level 1 ==
=== Group A ===
Pos	Team	Pld	W	L	MF	MA	MD	GF	GA	GD	PF	PA	PD	Pts	Qualification
1	China	3	3	0	14	1	+13	28	2	+26	622	395	+227	3	Advance to Semi-finals
2	England	3	2	1	7	8	−1	14	20	−6	586	640	−54	2	Advance to Semi-finals
3	Malaysia	3	1	2	6	9	−3	15	18	−3	581	600	−19	1	Advance to 5th/6th play-off
4	Thailand	3	0	3	3	12	−9	8	25	−17	505	659	−154	0	Advance to 7th/8th play-off

Source: TS

==== China vs. Thailand ====
China
5
Scotstoun Stadium, Court 1
11 June 2007, 18:30 UTC+0

Thailand
0

			1	2	3
1	(China) (Thailand)	Zheng Bo / Gao Ling; Songphon Anugritayawon / Kunchala Voravichitchaikul	21; 13	21; 12
2	(China) (Thailand)	Xie Xingfang; Soratja Chansrisukot	21; 11	21; 9
3	(China) (Thailand)	Lin Dan; Poompat Sapkulchananart	21; 18	21; 14
4	(China) (Thailand)	Cai Yun / Fu Haifeng; Patapol Ngernsrisuk / Tesana Panvisvas	21; 10	21; 11
5	(China) (Thailand)	Yang Wei / Zhao Tingting; Duanganong Aroonkesorn / Kunchala Voravichitchaikul	21; 8	21; 9

==== Malaysia vs. England ====
Malaysia
2
Scotstoun Stadium, Court 2
11 June 2007, 18:30 UTC+0

England
3

			1	2	3
1	(Malaysia) (England)	Tan Wee Kiong / Woon Khe Wei; Nathan Robertson / Gail Emms	10; 21	12; 21
2	(Malaysia) (England)	Lee Chong Wei; Andrew Smith	21; 10	21; 10
3	(Malaysia) (England)	Wong Mew Choo; Tracey Hallam	21; 14	21; 18
4	(Malaysia) (England)	Koo Kien Keat / Tan Boon Heong; Anthony Clark / Robert Blair	21; 18	16; 21	16; 21
5	(Malaysia) (England)	Lyddia Cheah / Wong Pei Tty; Gail Emms / Donna Kellogg	20; 22	21; 18	21; 23

==== Malaysia vs. Thailand ====
Malaysia
3
Scotstoun Stadium, Court 2
12 June 2007, 18:30 UTC+0

Thailand
2

			1	2	3
1	(Malaysia) (Thailand)	Tan Wee Kiong / Woon Khe Wei; Sudket Prapakamol / Saralee Thungthongkam	17; 21	14; 21
2	(Malaysia) (Thailand)	Lee Chong Wei; Boonsak Ponsana	21; 15	21; 16
3	(Malaysia) (Thailand)	Wong Mew Choo; Salakjit Ponsana	17; 21	21; 10	15; 21
4	(Malaysia) (Thailand)	Koo Kien Keat / Tan Boon Heong; Patapol Ngernsrisuk / Sudket Prapakamol	21; 12	21; 16
5	(Malaysia) (Thailand)	Chin Eei Hui / Wong Pei Tty; Duanganong Aroonkesorn / Kunchala Voravichitchaikul	21; 16	21; 12

==== China vs. England ====
China
5
Scotstoun Stadium, Court 3
12 June 2007, 18:30 UTC+0

England
0

			1	2	3
1	(China) (England)	Zheng Bo / Gao Ling; Anthony Clark / Donna Kellogg	21; 14	21; 16
2	(China) (England)	Lin Dan; Andrew Smith	21; 19	21; 11
3	(China) (England)	Zhang Ning; Tracey Hallam	21; 9	21; 15
4	(China) (England)	Cai Yun / Fu Haifeng; Robert Blair / David Lindley	21; 14	21; 7
5	(China) (England)	Wei Yili / Zhang Yawen; Gail Emms / Donna Kellogg	21; 12	21; 13

==== China vs. Malaysia ====
China
4
Scotstoun Stadium, Court 1
14 June 2007, 09:30 UTC+0

Malaysia
1

			1	2	3
1	(China) (Malaysia)	Zheng Bo / Gao Ling; Tan Wee Kiong / Woon Khe Wei	21; 15	21; 17
2	(China) (Malaysia)	Zhang Ning; Anita Raj Kaur	21; 16	21; 10
3	(China) (Malaysia)	Cai Yun / Fu Haifeng; Koo Kien Keat / Tan Boon Heong	21; 9	21; 14
4	(China) (Malaysia)	Yang Wei / Zhao Tingting; Chin Eei Hui / Wong Pei Tty	21; 12	21; 15
5	(China) (Malaysia)	Lin Dan; Lee Chong Wei	17; 21	17; 21

==== England vs. Thailand ====
England
4
Scotstoun Stadium, Court 1
14 June 2007, 13:30 UTC+0

Thailand
1

			1	2	3
1	(England) (Thailand)	Nathan Robertson / Gail Emms; Sudket Prapakamol / Saralee Thungthongkam	19; 21	21; 16	21; 17
2	(England) (Thailand)	Andreww Smith; Boonsak Ponsana	21; 23	13; 21
3	(England) (Thailand)	Tracey Hallam; Salakjit Ponsana	21; 13	21; 18
4	(England) (Thailand)	Anthony Clark / Robert Blair; Songphon Anugritayawon / Tesana Panvisvas	21; 18	18; 21	21; 9
5	(England) (Thailand)	Gail Emms / Donna Kellogg; Duanganong Aroonkesorn / Kunchala Voravichitchaikul	21; 14	21; 18

=== Group B ===
Pos	Team	Pld	W	L	MF	MA	MD	GF	GA	GD	PF	PA	PD	Pts	Qualification
1	Indonesia	3	2	1	10	5	+5	22	15	+7	706	635	+71	2	Advance to Semi-finals
2	South Korea	3	2	1	9	6	+3	20	15	+5	652	600	+52	2	Advance to Semi-finals
3	Denmark	3	2	1	7	8	−1	19	17	+2	658	661	−3	2	Advance to 5th/6th play-off
4	Hong Kong	3	0	3	4	11	−7	11	25	−14	584	704	−120	0	Advance to 7th/8th play-off

Source: TS

==== Denmark vs. Hong Kong ====
Denmark
3
Scotstoun Stadium, Court 3
11 June 2007, 18:30 UTC+0

Hong Kong
2

			1	2	3
1	(Denmark) (Hong Kong)	Thomas Laybourn / Kamilla Rytter Juhl; Yohan Hadikusumo Wiratama / Chau Hoi Wah	21; 19	21; 11
2	(Denmark) (Hong Kong)	Kenneth Jonassen; Chan Yan Kit	21; 19	21; 17
3	(Denmark) (Hong Kong)	Tine Rasmussen; Yip Pui Yin	22; 20	21; 19
4	(Denmark) (Hong Kong)	Jens Eriksen / Martin Lundgaard Hansen; Albertus Susanto Njoto / Yohan Hadikusumo Wiratama	21; 8	20; 22	18; 21
5	(Denmark) (Hong Kong)	Lena Frier Kristiansen / Helle Nielsen; Chau Hoi Wah / Koon Wai Chee	13; 21	21; 14	15; 21

==== South Korea vs. Indonesia ====
South Korea
3
Scotstoun Stadium, Court 5
11 June 2007, 18:30 UTC+0

Indonesia
2

			1	2	3
1	(South Korea) (Indonesia)	Han Sang-hoon / Lee Hyo-jung; Nova Widianto / Liliyana Natsir	10; 21	21; 17	21; 12
2	(South Korea) (Indonesia)	Park Sung-hwan; Taufik Hidayat	12; 21	22; 24
3	(South Korea) (Indonesia)	Lee Yun-hwa; Adriyanti Firdasari	21; 19	16; 21	21; 16
4	(South Korea) (Indonesia)	Jung Jae-sung / Lee Jae-jin; Markis Kido / Hendra Setiawan	16; 21	17; 21
5	(South Korea) (Indonesia)	Lee Hyo-jung / Lee Kyung-won; Vita Marissa / Greysia Polii	21; 14	21; 14

==== Denmark vs. Indonesia ====
Denmark
1
Scotstoun Stadium, Court 2
12 June 2007, 13:30 UTC+0

Indonesia
4

			1	2	3
1	(Denmark) (Indonesia)	Peter Gade; Taufik Hidayat	18; 21	21; 18	13; 21
2	(Denmark) (Indonesia)	Tine Rasmussen; Maria Kristin Yulianti	21; 19	21; 17
3	(Denmark) (Indonesia)	Lars Paaske / Jonas Rasmussen; Markis Kido / Hendra Setiawan	21; 12	17; 21	11; 21
4	(Denmark) (Indonesia)	Lena Frier Kristiansen / Helle Nielsen; Vita Marissa / Greysia Polii	20; 22	10; 21
5	(Denmark) (Indonesia)	Thomas Laybourn / Kamilla Rytter Juhl; Nova Widianto / Liliyana Natsir	19; 21	17; 21

==== South Korea vs. Hong Kong ====
South Korea
4
Scotstoun Stadium, Court 3
12 June 2007, 13:30 UTC+0

Hong Kong
1

			1	2	3
1	(South Korea) (Hong Kong)	Han Sang-hoon / Hwang Yu-mi; Yohan Hadikusumo Wiratama / Chau Hoi Wah	21; 10	21; 11
2	(South Korea) (Hong Kong)	Park Sung-hwan; Ng Wei	21; 12	21; 13
3	(South Korea) (Hong Kong)	Jang Soo-young; Yip Pui Yin	21; 19	14; 21	16; 21
4	(South Korea) (Hong Kong)	Hwang Ji-man / Lee Jae-jin; Albertus Susanto Njoto / Yohan Hadikusumo Wiratama	21; 16	21; 16
5	(South Korea) (Hong Kong)	Lee Hyo-jung / Lee Kyung-won; Chau Hoi Wah / Koon Wai Chee	21; 12	21; 14

==== Indonesia vs. Hong Kong ====
Indonesia
4
Scotstoun Stadium, Court 1
13 June 2007, 13:30 UTC+0

Hong Kong
1

			1	2	3
1	(Indonesia) (Hong Kong)	Flandy Limpele / Vita Marissa; Yohan Hadikusumo Wiratama / Chau Hoi Wah	21; 11	21; 18
2	(Indonesia) (Hong Kong)	Sony Dwi Kuncoro; Ng Wei	21; 16	15; 21	21; 17
3	(Indonesia) (Hong Kong)	Adriyanti Firdasari; Yip Pui Yin	10; 21	20; 22
4	(Indonesia) (Hong Kong)	Alvent Yulianto / Candra Wijaya; Albertus Susanto Njoto / Yohan Hadikusumo Wiratama	18; 21	21; 14	21; 10
5	(Indonesia) (Hong Kong)	Liliyana Natsir / Greysia Polii; Chau Hoi Wah / Koon Wai Chee	21; 7	19; 21	21; 8

==== Denmark vs. South Korea ====
Denmark
3
Scotstoun Stadium, Court 1
13 June 2007, 18:30 UTC+0

South Korea
2

			1	2	3
1	(Denmark) (South Korea)	Jens Eriksen / Kamilla Rytter Juhl; Han Sang-hoon / Lee Hyo-jung	14; 21	24; 22	13; 21
2	(Denmark) (South Korea)	Peter Gade; Park Tae-sang	21; 16	4; 21	21; 6
3	(Denmark) (South Korea)	Tine Rasmussen; Hwang Hye-youn	21; 18	21; 10
4	(Denmark) (South Korea)	Lars Paaske / Jonas Rasmussen; Hwang Ji-man / Lee Jae-jin	21; 18	21; 19
5	(Denmark) (South Korea)	Lena Frier Kristiansen / Kamilla Rytter Juhl; Lee Hyo-jung / Lee Kyung-won	19; 21	14; 21

== Level 2 ==
=== Group A ===
Pos	Team	Pld	W	L	MF	MA	MD	GF	GA	GD	PF	PA	PD	Pts	Qualification
1	Singapore	3	3	0	12	3	+9	25	7	+18	638	533	+105	3	Advance to 9th/10th play-off
2	Chinese Taipei	3	2	1	11	4	+7	23	10	+13	641	537	+104	2	Advance to 11th/12th play-off
3	Germany	3	1	2	6	9	−3	14	20	−6	608	645	−37	1	Advance to 13th/14th play-off
4	Sweden	3	0	3	1	14	−13	4	29	−25	505	677	−172	0	Advance to 15th/16th play-off

Source: TS

==== Singapore vs. Sweden ====
Singapore
5
Scotstoun Stadium, Court 1
11 June 2007, 09:30 UTC+0

Sweden
0

			1	2	3
1	(Singapore) (Sweden)	Hendri Saputra / Li Yujia; Henri Hurskainen / Elin Bergblom	21; 14	21; 16
2	(Singapore) (Sweden)	Kendrick Lee Yen Hui; Magnus Sahlberg	23; 21	21; 14
3	(Singapore) (Sweden)	Li Li; Sara Persson	21; 14	17; 21	21; 14
4	(Singapore) (Sweden)	Ronald Susilo / Hendra Wijaya; Gabriel Ulldahl / Mathias Wigardh	21; 19	21; 12
5	(Singapore) (Sweden)	Jiang Yanmei / Li Yujia; Elin Bergblom / Emelie Lennartsson	21; 13	21; 11

==== Germany vs. Chinese Taipei ====
Germany
1
Scotstoun Stadium, Court 2
11 June 2007, 09:30 UTC+0

Chinese Taipei
4

			1	2	3
1	(Germany) (Chinese Taipei)	Huaiwen Xu; Cheng Shao-chieh	13; 21	21; 15	21; 17
2	(Germany) (Chinese Taipei)	Kristof Hopp / Ingo Kindervater; Hu Chung-shien / Tsai Chia-hsin	18; 21	13; 21
3	(Germany) (Chinese Taipei)	Roman Spitko; Hsieh Yu-hsing	21; 12	23; 25	17; 21
4	(Germany) (Chinese Taipei)	Nicole Grether / Juliane Schenk; Cheng Wen-hsing / Chien Yu-chin	12; 21	11; 21
5	(Germany) (Chinese Taipei)	Kristof Hopp / Birgit Overzier; Tsai Chia-hsin / Cheng Shao-chieh	12; 21	18; 21

==== Singapore vs. Chinese Taipei ====
Singapore
3
Scotstoun Stadium, Court 5
13 June 2007, 09:30 UTC+0

Chinese Taipei
2

			1	2	3
1	(Singapore) (Chinese Taipei)	Hendri Saputra / Li Yujia; Tsai Chia-hsin / Cheng Shao-chieh	21; 10	21; 15
2	(Singapore) (Chinese Taipei)	Ronald Susilo; Hsieh Yu-hsing	21; 14	21; 18
3	(Singapore) (Chinese Taipei)	Li Li; Cheng Shao-chieh	21; 15	11; 21	16; 21
4	(Singapore) (Chinese Taipei)	Hendri Saputra / Hendra Wijaya; Fang Chieh-min / Lee Sheng-mu	21; 18	22; 20
5	(Singapore) (Chinese Taipei)	Jiang Yanmei / Li Yujia; Cheng Wen-hsing / Chien Yu-chin	19; 21	11; 21

==== Germany vs. Sweden ====
Germany
4
Scotstoun Stadium, Court 2
13 June 2007, 09:30 UTC+0

Sweden
1

			1	2	3
1	(Germany) (Sweden)	Ingo Kindervater / Kathrin Piotrowski; Henri Hurskainen / Johanna Persson	21; 11	21; 17
2	(Germany) (Sweden)	Marc Zwiebler; Magnus Sahlberg	21; 13	13; 21	21; 16
3	(Germany) (Sweden)	Huaiwen Xu; Sara Persson	21; 19	21; 18
4	(Germany) (Sweden)	Michael Fuchs / Kristof Hopp; Henri Hurskainen / Magnus Sahlberg	21; 12	21; 16
5	(Germany) (Sweden)	Nicole Grether / Juliane Schenk; Elin Bergblom / Johanna Persson	21; 23	21; 17	15; 21

==== Singapore vs. Germany ====
Singapore
4
Scotstoun Stadium, Court 6
14 June 2007, 13:30 UTC+0

Germany
1

			1	2	3
1	(Singapore) (Germany)	Hendri Saputra / Li Yujia; Ingo Kindervater / Kathrin Piotrowski	21; 16	21; 11
2	(Singapore) (Germany)	Kendrick Lee Yen Hui; Marcel Reuter	21; 10	23; 21
3	(Singapore) (Germany)	Li Li; Juliane Schenk	17; 21	14; 21
4	(Singapore) (Germany)	Hendri Saputra / Hendra Wijaya; Michael Fuchs / Roman Spitko	23; 21	21; 13
5	(Singapore) (Germany)	Jiang Yanmei / Li Yujia; Nicole Grether / Birgit Overzier	22; 20	21; 16

==== Chinese Taipei vs. Sweden ====
Chinese Taipei
5
Scotstoun Stadium, Court 3
14 June 2007, 13:30 UTC+0

Sweden
0

			1	2	3
1	(Chinese Taipei) (Sweden)	Tsai Chia-hsin / Cheng Shao-chieh; Henri Hurskainen / Elin Bergblom	21; 16	21; 14
2	(Chinese Taipei) (Sweden)	Hsieh Yu-hsing; Magnus Sahlberg	21; 16	21; 14
3	(Chinese Taipei) (Sweden)	Chiu Yi-ju; Emelie Lennartsson	21; 17	21; 9
4	(Chinese Taipei) (Sweden)	Hu Chung-shien / Tsai Chia-hsin; Gabriel Ulldahl / Mathias Wigardh	21; 7	21; 15
5	(Chinese Taipei) (Sweden)	Cheng Wen-hsing / Chien Yu-chin; Elin Bergblom / Johanna Persson	21; 14	21; 10

=== Group B ===
Pos	Team	Pld	W	L	MF	MA	MD	GF	GA	GD	PF	PA	PD	Pts	Qualification
1	Japan	3	3	0	11	4	+7	24	11	+13	688	579	+109	3	Advance to 9th/10th play-off
2	Poland	3	2	1	9	6	+3	19	14	+5	578	613	−35	2	Advance to 11th/12th play-off
3	Netherlands	3	1	2	6	9	−3	14	21	−7	619	638	−19	1	Advance to 13th/14th play-off
4	Russia	3	0	3	4	11	−7	11	22	−11	571	626	−55	0	Advance to 15th/16th play-off

Source: TS

==== Japan vs. Netherlands ====
Japan
4
Scotstoun Stadium, Court 3
11 June 2007, 09:30 UTC+0

Netherlands
1

			1	2	3
1	(Japan) (Netherlands)	Shōji Satō; Eric Pang	21; 17	18; 21	12; 21
2	(Japan) (Netherlands)	Shintaro Ikeda / Shuichi Sakamoto; Ruud Bosch / Koen Ridder	21; 11	16; 21	21; 8
3	(Japan) (Netherlands)	Eriko Hirose; Yao Jie	21; 15	22; 20
4	(Japan) (Netherlands)	Kumiko Ogura / Reiko Shiota; Judith Meulendijks / Rachel van Cutsen	21; 17	22; 24	21; 13
5	(Japan) (Netherlands)	Keita Masuda / Miyuki Maeda; Dicky Palyama / Paulien van Dooremalen	21; 12	21; 18

==== Poland vs. Russia ====
Poland
4
Scotstoun Stadium, Court 4
11 June 2007, 09:30 UTC+0

Russia
1

			1	2	3
1	(Poland) (Russia)	Robert Mateusiak / Nadieżda Kostiuczyk; Vitalij Durkin / Valeria Sorokina	21; 17	23; 21
2	(Poland) (Russia)	Przemysław Wacha; Sergey Ivlev	21; 19	13; 21	21; 16
3	(Poland) (Russia)	Agnieszka Wojtkowska; Ella Karachkova	12; 21	7; 21
4	(Poland) (Russia)	Kamila Augustyn / Nadieżda Kostiuczyk; Valeria Sorokina / Nina Vislova	22; 20	21; 13
5	(Poland) (Russia)	Michał Łogosz / Robert Mateusiak; Vitalij Durkin / Aleksandr Nikolaenko	21; 18	21; 18

==== Japan vs. Russia ====
Japan
4
Scotstoun Stadium, Court 2
13 June 2007, 13:30 UTC+0

Russia
1

			1	2	3
1	(Japan) (Russia)	Keita Masuda / Miyuki Maeda; Aleksandr Nikolaenko / Nina Vislova	16; 21	13; 21
2	(Japan) (Russia)	Kenichi Tago; Vladimir Ivanov	21; 14	21; 13
3	(Japan) (Russia)	Eriko Hirose; Ella Karachkova	21; 15	21; 10
4	(Japan) (Russia)	Shintaro Ikeda / Shuichi Sakamoto; Vitalij Durkin / Aleksandr Nikolaenko	21; 16	21; 15
5	(Japan) (Russia)	Kumiko Ogura / Reiko Shiota; Ekaterina Ananina / Anastasia Russkikh	21; 17	21; 15

==== Poland vs. Netherlands ====
Poland
3
Scotstoun Stadium, Court 3
13 June 2007, 13:30 UTC+0

Netherlands
2

			1	2	3
1	(Poland) (Netherlands)	Robert Mateusiak / Nadieżda Kostiuczyk; Eric Pang / Paulien van Dooremalen	21; 13	21; 19
2	(Poland) (Netherlands)	Przemysław Wacha; Dicky Palyama	17; 21	18; 21
3	(Poland) (Netherlands)	Agnieszka Wojtkowska; Yao Jie	5; 21	5; 21
4	(Poland) (Netherlands)	Michał Łogosz / Robert Mateusiak; Ruud Bosch / Koen Ridder	21; 13	21; 17
5	(Poland) (Netherlands)	Kamila Augustyn / Nadieżda Kostiuczyk; Judith Meulendijks / Rachel van Cutsen	21; 17	21; 12

==== Russia vs. Netherlands ====
Russia
2
Scotstoun Stadium, Court 3
14 June 2007, 18:30 UTC+0

Netherlands
3

			1	2	3
1	(Russia) (Netherlands)	Aleksandr Nikolaenko / Nina Vislova; Judith Meulendijks / Eric Pang	21; 12	21; 14
2	(Russia) (Netherlands)	Ella Karachkova; Yao Jie	21; 18	18; 21	14; 21
3	(Russia) (Netherlands)	Vladimir Ivanov; Dicky Palyama	6; 21	12; 21
4	(Russia) (Netherlands)	Vitalij Durkin / Aleksandr Nikolaenko; Ruud Bosch / Koen Ridder	21; 18	21; 19
5	(Russia) (Netherlands)	Ekaterina Ananina / Anastasia Russkikh; Judith Meulendijks / Yao Jie	21; 17	21; 23	12; 21

==== Japan vs. Poland ====
Japan
3
Scotstoun Stadium, Court 4
14 June 2007, 18:30 UTC+0

Poland
2

			1	2	3
1	(Japan) (Poland)	Keita Masuda / Miyuki Maeda; Robert Mateusiak / Nadieżda Kostiuczyk	20; 22	21; 18	19; 21
2	(Japan) (Poland)	Shōji Satō; Przemysław Wacha	11; 21	17; 21
3	(Japan) (Poland)	Mizuki Fujii; Agnieszka Wojtkowska	21; 9	21; 7
4	(Japan) (Poland)	Shintaro Ikeda / Shuichi Sakamoto; Michał Łogosz / Robert Mateusiak	21; 16	19; 21	21; 16
5	(Japan) (Poland)	Kumiko Ogura / Reiko Shiota; Kamila Augustyn / Nadieżda Kostiuczyk	21; 17	21; 15

== Level 3 ==
=== Group A ===
Pos	Team	Pld	W	L	MF	MA	MD	GF	GA	GD	PF	PA	PD	Pts	Qualification
1	France	3	3	0	14	1	+13	29	9	+20	763	620	+143	3	Advance to 17th/18th play-off
2	United States	3	1	2	6	9	−3	16	20	−4	660	683	−23	1	Advance to 19th/20th play-off
3	Canada	3	1	2	5	10	−5	12	22	−10	586	669	−83	1	Advance to 21st/22nd play-off
4	Ukraine	3	1	2	5	10	−5	14	20	−6	609	646	−37	1	Advance to 23rd/24th play-off

Source: TS

==== Canada vs. United States ====
Canada
1
Scotstoun Stadium, Court 7
11 June 2007, 18:30 UTC+0

United States
4

			1	2	3
1	(Canada) (United States)	Mike Beres / Valerie Loker; Howard Bach / Eva Lee	21; 16	15; 21	17; 21
2	(Canada) (United States)	Stephan Wojcikiewicz; Eric Go	15; 21	12; 21
3	(Canada) (United States)	Sarah MacMaster; Lili Zhou	15; 21	16; 21
4	(Canada) (United States)	Mike Beres / William Milroy; Howard Bach / Khan Malaythong	19; 21	21; 19	27; 25
5	(Canada) (United States)	Fiona McKee / Charmaine Reid; Eva Lee / Lili Zhou	16; 21	16; 21

==== France vs. Ukraine ====
France
5
Scotstoun Stadium, Court 6
11 June 2007, 18:30 UTC+0

Ukraine
0

			1	2	3
1	(France) (Ukraine)	Erwin Kehlhoffner; Vladislav Druzchenko	18; 21	21; 17	21; 15
2	(France) (Ukraine)	Pi Hongyan; Elena Prus	21; 13	21; 9
3	(France) (Ukraine)	Mihail Popov / Svetoslav Stoyanov; Valeriy Atrashchenkov / Dmytro Zavadsky	21; 16	21; 12
4	(France) (Ukraine)	Élodie Eymard / Pi Hongyan; Larisa Griga / Elena Nozdran	18; 21	21; 17	21; 15
5	(France) (Ukraine)	Svetoslav Stoyanov / Élodie Eymard; Vladislav Druzchenko / Natalia Golovkina	14; 21	25; 23	21; 15

==== France vs. United States ====
France
5
Scotstoun Stadium, Court 1
12 June 2007, 13:30 UTC+0

United States
0

			1	2	3
1	(France) (United States)	Svetoslav Stoyanov / Élodie Eymard; Howard Bach / Eva Lee	16; 21	21; 14	21; 16
2	(France) (United States)	Simon Maunoury; Eric Go	12; 21	21; 17	21; 18
3	(France) (United States)	Pi Hongyan; Lauren Todt	21; 10	21; 8
4	(France) (United States)	Mihail Popov / Svetoslav Stoyanov; Howard Bach / Khan Malaythong	21; 17	16; 21	22; 20
5	(France) (United States)	Élodie Eymard / Weny Rahmawati; Eva Lee / Lili Zhou	21; 11	21; 14

==== Canada vs. Ukraine ====
Canada
3
Scotstoun Stadium, Court 4
12 June 2007, 13:30 UTC+0

Ukraine
2

			1	2	3
1	(Canada) (Ukraine)	Mike Beres / Valerie Loker; Valeriy Atrashchenkov / Elena Prus	21; 18	21; 17
2	(Canada) (Ukraine)	Andrew Dabeka; Dmytro Zavadsky	21; 15	21; 14
3	(Canada) (Ukraine)	Charmaine Reid; Larisa Griga	8; 21	17; 21
4	(Canada) (Ukraine)	Mike Beres / William Milroy; Valeriy Atrashchenkov / Vladislav Druzchenko	21; 14	21; 14
5	(Canada) (Ukraine)	Valerie Loker / Sarah MacMaster; Natalia Golovkina / Elena Nozdran	14; 21	14; 21

==== France vs. Canada ====
France
4
Scotstoun Stadium, Court 5
14 June 2007, 18:30 UTC+0

Canada
1

			1	2	3
1	(France) (Canada)	Svetoslav Stoyanov / Élodie Eymard; Mike Beres / Valerie Loker	21; 17	15; 21	17; 21
2	(France) (Canada)	Erwin Kehlhoffner; Bobby Milroy	21; 17	20; 22	21; 18
3	(France) (Canada)	Pi Hongyan; Anna Rice	21; 10	21; 8
4	(France) (Canada)	Mihail Popov / Svetoslav Stoyanov; Mike Beres / William Milroy	21; 16	21; 13
5	(France) (Canada)	Élodie Eymard / Weny Rahmawati; Fiona McKee / Charmaine Reid	24; 22	21; 12

==== United States vs. Ukraine ====
United States
2
Scotstoun Stadium, Court 6
14 June 2007, 18:30 UTC+0

Ukraine
3

			1	2	3
1	(United States) (Ukraine)	Eric Go; Vladislav Druzchenko	15; 21	21; 23
2	(United States) (Ukraine)	Howard Bach / Khan Malaythong; Valeriy Atrashchenkov / Dmytro Zavadsky	22; 20	21; 13
3	(United States) (Ukraine)	Eva Lee / Mesinee Mangkalakiri; Natalia Golovkina / Elena Nozdran	20; 22	16; 21
4	(United States) (Ukraine)	Lili Zhou; Larisa Griga	14; 21	19; 21
5	(United States) (Ukraine)	Howard Bach / Eva Lee; Vladislav Druzchenko / Natalia Golovkina	10; 21	21; 13	24; 22

=== Group B ===
Pos	Team	Pld	W	L	MF	MA	MD	GF	GA	GD	PF	PA	PD	Pts	Qualification
1	India	3	3	0	13	2	+11	28	9	+19	734	576	+158	3	Advance to 17th/18th play-off
2	Scotland (H)	3	2	1	9	6	+3	22	13	+9	630	622	+8	2	Advance to 19th/20th play-off
3	New Zealand	3	1	2	4	11	−7	10	23	−13	537	621	−84	1	Advance to 21st/22nd play-off
4	Finland	3	0	3	4	11	−7	8	23	−15	498	580	−82	0	Advance to 23rd/24th play-off

Source: TS
(H) Host

==== Scotland vs. New Zealand ====
Scotland
4
Scotstoun Stadium, Court 1
11 June 2007, 13:30 UTC+0

New Zealand
1

			1	2	3
1	(Scotland) (New Zealand)	Imogen Bankier / Watson Briggs; Daniel Shirley / Renee Flavell	21; 13	21; 15
2	(Scotland) (New Zealand)	Craig Goddard; John Moody	21; 14	5; 21	7; 21
3	(Scotland) (New Zealand)	Susan Hughes; Rachel Hindley	22; 20	21; 13
4	(Scotland) (New Zealand)	Andrew Bowman / Watson Briggs; John Gordon / Daniel Shirley	21; 19	21; 18
5	(Scotland) (New Zealand)	Yuan Wemyss / Emma Mason; Donna Cranston / Renee Flavell	21; 10	21; 18

==== India vs. Finland ====
India
4
Scotstoun Stadium, Court 2
11 June 2007, 13:30 UTC+0

Finland
1

			1	2	3
1	(India) (Finland)	Valiyaveetil Diju / Aparna Balan; Tuomas Nuorteva / Maria Väisänen	21; 15	21; 9
2	(India) (Finland)	Saina Nehwal; Anu Nieminen	21; 13	21; 13
3	(India) (Finland)	Anup Sridhar; Ville Lång	11; 21	21; 15	16; 21
4	(India) (Finland)	Rupesh Kumar K. T. / Sanave Thomas; Tuomas Nuorteva / Mikko Vikman	21; 7	21; 15
5	(India) (Finland)	Aparna Balan / Saina Nehwal; Elina Väisänen / Maria Väisänen	21; 11	21; 17

==== Scotland vs. Finland ====
Scotland
4
Scotstoun Stadium, Court 1
12 June 2007, 18:30 UTC+0

Finland
1

			1	2	3
1	(Scotland) (Finland)	Gordon Thomson; Ville Lång	9; 21	8; 21
2	(Scotland) (Finland)	Imogen Bankier / Watson Briggs; Tuomas Nuorteva / Maria Väisänen	21; 14	21; 16
3	(Scotland) (Finland)	Yuan Wemyss; Anu Nieminen	21; 12	22; 20
4	(Scotland) (Finland)	Andrew Bowman / Watson Briggs; Ville Lång / Tuomas Nuorteva	21; 15	21; 13
5	(Scotland) (Finland)	Imogen Bankier / Emma Mason; Elina Väisänen / Maria Väisänen	26; 24	21; 9

==== India vs. New Zealand ====
India
5
Scotstoun Stadium, Court 5
12 June 2007, 18:30 UTC+0

New Zealand
0

			1	2	3
1	(India) (New Zealand)	Valiyaveetil Diju / Aparna Balan; Daniel Shirley / Renee Flavell	21; 14	21; 18
2	(India) (New Zealand)	Saina Nehwal; Michelle Chan	21; 13	21; 12
3	(India) (New Zealand)	Anup Sridhar; John Moody	21; 7	21; 13
4	(India) (New Zealand)	Rupesh Kumar K. T. / Sanave Thomas; John Gordon / Daniel Shirley	17; 21	21; 15	21; 16
5	(India) (New Zealand)	Aparna Balan / Saina Nehwal; Renee Flavell / Rachel Hindley	21; 18	16; 21	21; 14

==== India vs. Scotland ====
India
4
Scotstoun Stadium, Court 1
14 June 2007, 18:30 UTC+0

Scotland
1

			1	2	3
1	(India) (Scotland)	Valiyaveetil Diju / Aparna Balan; Imogen Bankier / Watson Briggs	18; 21	21; 16	21; 18
2	(India) (Scotland)	Saina Nehwal; Susan Hughes	21; 15	19; 21	21; 12
3	(India) (Scotland)	Anup Sridhar; Craig Goddard	19; 21	21; 7	21; 11
4	(India) (Scotland)	Rupesh Kumar K. T. / Sanave Thomas; Andrew Bowman / Watson Briggs	21; 14	24; 22
5	(India) (Scotland)	Aparna Balan / Saina Nehwal; Imogen Bankier / Emma Mason	13; 21	21; 17	14; 14

==== New Zealand vs. Finland ====
New Zealand
3
Scotstoun Stadium, Court 2
14 June 2007, 18:30 UTC+0

Finland
2

			1	2	3
1	(New Zealand) (Finland)	Alan Chan; Ville Lång	15; 21	11; 21
2	(New Zealand) (Finland)	Rachel Hindley; Anu Nieminen	6; 21	12; 21
3	(New Zealand) (Finland)	John Gordon / Daniel Shirley; Tuomas Nuorteva / Mikko Vikman	21; 7	21; 18
4	(New Zealand) (Finland)	Donna Cranston / Renee Flavell; Elina Väisänen / Maria Väisänen	24; 22	21; 15
5	(New Zealand) (Finland)	Renee Flavell / Daniel Shirley; Ville Lång / Anu Nieminen	21; 17	21; 13

== Level 4 ==
=== Group A ===
Pos	Team	Pld	W	L	MF	MA	MD	GF	GA	GD	PF	PA	PD	Pts	Qualification
1	Australia	3	3	0	11	4	+7	24	10	+14	675	554	+121	3	Advance to 25th/26th play-off
2	Italy	3	2	1	8	7	+1	17	15	+2	570	557	+13	2	Advance to 27th/28th play-off
3	Wales	3	1	2	8	7	+1	16	17	−1	556	554	+2	1	Advance to 29th/30th play-off
4	Spain	3	0	3	3	12	−9	9	24	−15	511	647	−136	0	Advance to 31st/32nd play-off

Source: TS

==== Australia vs. Wales ====
Australia
3
Scotstoun Stadium, Court 5
11 June 2007, 09:30 UTC+0

Wales
2

			1	2	3
1	(Australia) (Wales)	Tania Luiz / Ross Smith; Matthew Hughes / Rachele Phillips	21; 11	21; 15
2	(Australia) (Wales)	Stuart Gomez; Martyn Lewis	12; 21	16; 21
3	(Australia) (Wales)	Huang Chia-chi; Caroline Harvey	21; 10	21; 11
4	(Australia) (Wales)	Ross Smith / Glenn Warfe; Matthew Hughes / Martyn Lewis	21; 18	14; 21	15; 21
5	(Australia) (Wales)	Huang Chia-chi / Tania Luiz; Harriet Johnson / Rachele Phillips	21; 13	21; 14

==== Spain vs. Italy ====
Spain
2
Scotstoun Stadium, Court 6
11 June 2007, 09:30 UTC+0

Italy
3

			1	2	3
1	(Spain) (Italy)	Pablo Abián; Klaus Raffeiner	21; 14	21; 12
2	(Spain) (Italy)	Lucia Tavera; Agnese Allegrini	11; 21	11; 21
3	(Spain) (Italy)	Carlos Longo / Ernesto Velázquez; Luigi Izzo / Giovanni Traina	21; 17	22; 20
4	(Spain) (Italy)	Sandra Chirlaque / Laura Molina; Agnese Allegrini / Hui Ding	17; 21	11; 21
5	(Spain) (Italy)	Carlos Longo / Laura Molina; Hui Ding / Klaus Raffeiner	15; 21	14; 21

==== Australia vs. Italy ====
Australia
3
Scotstoun Stadium, Court 5
12 June 2007, 13:30 UTC+0

Italy
2

			1	2	3
1	(Australia) (Italy)	Jeff Tho; Klaus Raffeiner	21; 18	23; 21
2	(Australia) (Italy)	Tania Luiz; Agnese Allegrini	21; 7	21; 11
3	(Australia) (Italy)	Ross Smith / Glenn Warfe; Enrico Galeani / Rosario Maddaloni	21; 19	21; 13
4	(Australia) (Italy)	Huang Chia-chi / Tania Luiz; Agnese Allegrini / Hui Ding	14; 21	17; 21
5	(Australia) (Italy)	Ross Smith / Tania Luiz; Klaus Raffeiner / Hui Ding	19; 21	22; 20	19; 21

==== Spain vs. Wales ====
Spain
1
Scotstoun Stadium, Court 6
12 June 2007, 13:30 UTC+0

Wales
4

			1	2	3
1	(Spain) (Wales)	Pablo Abián / Sandra Chirlaque; Matthew Hughes / Rachele Phillips	16; 21	11; 21
2	(Spain) (Wales)	Carlos Longo; Richard Vaughan	9; 21	14; 21
3	(Spain) (Wales)	Laura Molina; Vikki Jones	21; 14	21; 7
4	(Spain) (Wales)	Pablo Abián / Ernesto Velázquez; Matthew Hughes / Martyn Lewis	9; 21	11; 21
5	(Spain) (Wales)	Sandra Chirlaque / Lucia Tavera; Harriet Johnson / Rachele Phillips	16; 21	21; 17	13; 21

==== Australia vs. Spain ====
Australia
5
Scotstoun Stadium, Court 1
13 June 2007, 09:30 UTC+0

Spain
0

			1	2	3
1	(Australia) (Spain)	Huang Chia-chi; Sandra Chirlaque	21; 9	21; 6
2	(Australia) (Spain)	Jeff Tho; Ernesto Velázquez	21; 16	22; 20
3	(Australia) (Spain)	Ross Smith / Glenn Warfe; Pablo Abián / Carlos Longo	21; 9	21; 23	21; 13
4	(Australia) (Spain)	Huang Chia-chi / Tania Luiz; Sandra Chirlaque / Lucia Tavera	22; 20	21; 13
5	(Australia) (Spain)	Tania Luiz / Glenn Warfe; Laura Molina / Ernesto Velázquez	17; 21	23; 21	21; 14

==== Italy vs. Wales ====
Italy
3
Scotstoun Stadium, Court 2
13 June 2007, 09:30 UTC+0

Wales
2

			1	2	3
1	(Italy) (Wales)	Hui Ding / Klaus Raffeiner; Matthew Hughes / Rachele Phillips	21; 12	21; 18
2	(Italy) (Wales)	Giovanni Traina; Martyn Lewis	4; 21	12; 21
3	(Italy) (Wales)	Agnese Allegrini; Caroline Harvey	21; 10	21; 9
4	(Italy) (Wales)	Enrico Galeani / Rosario Maddaloni; Martyn Lewis / James Phillips	21; 18	15; 21	10; 21
5	(Italy) (Wales)	Agnese Allegrini / Hui Ding; Harriet Johnson / Rachele Phillips	21; 14	21; 9

=== Group B ===
Pos	Team	Pld	W	L	MF	MA	MD	GF	GA	GD	PF	PA	PD	Pts	Qualification
1	Czech Republic	3	3	0	10	5	+5	21	13	+8	620	588	+32	3	Advance to 25th/26th play-off
2	Bulgaria	3	2	1	10	5	+5	22	11	+11	638	519	+119	2	Advance to 27th/28th play-off
3	Switzerland	3	1	2	5	10	−5	12	22	−10	557	651	−94	1	Advance to 29th/30th play-off
4	Estonia	3	0	3	5	10	−5	11	20	−9	528	585	−57	0	Advance to 31st/32nd play-off

Source: TS

==== Bulgaria vs. Estonia ====
Bulgaria
4
Scotstoun Stadium, Court 7
11 June 2007, 09:30 UTC+0

Estonia
1

			1	2	3
1	(Bulgaria) (Estonia)	Krasimir Yankov; Raul Must	14; 21	17; 21
2	(Bulgaria) (Estonia)	Petya Nedelcheva; Kati Tolmoff	21; 12	21; 13
3	(Bulgaria) (Estonia)	Stiliyan Makarski / Vladimir Metodiev; Ants Mängel / Raul Must	21; 15	21; 8
4	(Bulgaria) (Estonia)	Diana Dimova / Petya Nedelcheva; Helen Reina / Kai-Riin Saluste	21; 16	21; 15
5	(Bulgaria) (Estonia)	Stiliyan Makarski / Linda Zetchiri; Ants Mängel / Karoliine Hõim	21; 15	21; 17

==== Czech Republic vs. Switzerland ====
Czech Republic
3
Scotstoun Stadium, Court 7
11 June 2007, 13:30 UTC+0

Switzerland
2

			1	2	3
1	(Czech Republic) (Switzerland)	Petr Koukal; Christian Bösiger	21; 13	21; 14
2	(Czech Republic) (Switzerland)	Kristína Ludíková; Jeanine Cicognini	13; 21	21; 15	13; 21
3	(Czech Republic) (Switzerland)	Jan Fröhlich / Jan Vondra; Michael Andrey / Christian Bösiger	14; 21	23; 21	21; 14
4	(Czech Republic) (Switzerland)	Martina Benešová / Kristína Ludíková; Sabrina Jaquet / Corinne Jörg	11; 21	11; 21
5	(Czech Republic) (Switzerland)	Martina Benešová / Petr Koukal; Michael Andrey / Sabrina Jaquet	21; 18	21; 14

==== Czech Republic vs. Estonia ====
Czech Republic
3
Scotstoun Stadium, Court 5
12 June 2007, 09:30 UTC+0

Estonia
2

			1	2	3
1	(Czech Republic) (Estonia)	Petr Koukal / Kristína Ludíková; Ants Mängel / Karoliine Hõim	21; 15	21; 13
2	(Czech Republic) (Estonia)	Jan Fröhlich; Raul Must	21; 14	21; 16
3	(Czech Republic) (Estonia)	Martina Benešová; Kati Tolmoff	9; 21	14; 21
4	(Czech Republic) (Estonia)	Petr Koukal / Jan Vondra; Ants Mängel / Raul Must	21; 9	21; 13
5	(Czech Republic) (Estonia)	Martina Benešová / Kristína Ludíková; Helen Reina / Kai-Riin Saluste	15; 21	19; 21

==== Bulgaria vs. Switzerland ====
Bulgaria
5
Scotstoun Stadium, Court 6
12 June 2007, 09:30 UTC+0

Switzerland
0

			1	2	3
1	(Bulgaria) (Switzerland)	Petya Nedelcheva; Monika Fisher	21; 7	21; 9
2	(Bulgaria) (Switzerland)	Krasimir Yankov; Oliver Andrey	21; 10	21; 9
3	(Bulgaria) (Switzerland)	Stiliyan Makarski / Vladimir Metodiev; Michael Andrey / Christian Bösiger	21; 15	21; 19
4	(Bulgaria) (Switzerland)	Diana Dimova / Petya Nedelcheva; Sabrina Jaquet / Corinne Jörg	21; 7	21; 12
5	(Bulgaria) (Switzerland)	Stiliyan Makarski / Linda Zetchiri; Christian Bösiger / Jeanine Cicognini	19; 21	21; 18	21; 13

==== Bulgaria vs. Czech Republic ====
Bulgaria
1
Scotstoun Stadium, Court 3
13 June 2007, 09:30 UTC+0

Czech Republic
4

			1	2	3
1	(Bulgaria) (Czech Republic)	Stiliyan Makarski / Linda Zetchiri; Jan Fröhlich / Kristína Ludíková	21; 19	16; 21	17; 21
2	(Bulgaria) (Czech Republic)	Blagovest Kisyov; Jan Vondra	10; 21	14; 21
3	(Bulgaria) (Czech Republic)	Petya Nedelcheva; Martina Benešová	21; 11	21; 11
4	(Bulgaria) (Czech Republic)	Stilliyan Makarski / Vladimir Metodiev; Petr Koukal / Jan Vondra	14; 21	21; 17	19; 21
5	(Bulgaria) (Czech Republic)	Petya Nedelcheva / Dimitria Popstoikova; Martina Benešová / Kristína Ludíková	18; 21	18; 21

==== Switzerland vs. Estonia ====
Switzerland
3
Scotstoun Stadium, Court 4
13 June 2007, 09:30 UTC+0

Estonia
2

			1	2	3
1	(Switzerland) (Estonia)	Oliver Andrey; Raul Must	16; 21	17; 21
2	(Switzerland) (Estonia)	Monika Fisher; Kati Tolmoff	7; 21	16; 21
3	(Switzerland) (Estonia)	Michael Andrey / Christian Bösiger; Ants Mängel / Raul Must	21; 19	21; 12
4	(Switzerland) (Estonia)	Jeanine Cicognini / Corinne Jörg; Helen Reina / Kai-Riin Saluste	22; 20	21; 18
5	(Switzerland) (Estonia)	Christian Bösiger / Sabrina Jaquet; Ants Mängel / Karoliine Hõim	19; 21	22; 20	21; 17

== Level 5 ==
=== Group A ===
Pos	Team	Pld	W	L	MF	MA	MD	GF	GA	GD	PF	PA	PD	Pts	Qualification
1	Lithuania	3	3	0	12	3	+9	24	10	+14	650	556	+94	3	Advance to 33rd/34th play-off
2	Slovenia	3	2	1	9	6	+3	22	13	+9	668	608	+60	2	Advance to 35th/36th play-off
3	South Africa	3	1	2	7	8	−1	15	19	−4	585	597	−12	1	Advance to 37th/38th play-off
4	Luxembourg	3	0	3	2	13	−11	8	27	−19	549	691	−142	0	Advance to 39th/40th play-off

Source: TS

==== Slovenia vs. Luxembourg ====
Slovenia
5
Scotstoun Stadium, Court 3
11 June 2007, 13:30 UTC+0

Luxembourg
0

			1	2	3
1	(Slovenia) (Luxembourg)	Luka Petrič; Mathieu Serebriakoff	21; 8	21; 13
2	(Slovenia) (Luxembourg)	Maja Tvrdy; Hariati	21; 23	21; 17	21; 18
3	(Slovenia) (Luxembourg)	Luka Kumelj / Luka Petrič; Joel Fischbach / Ben Speltz	21; 7	21; 11
4	(Slovenia) (Luxembourg)	Maja Kersnik / Maja Tvrdy; Zoe Schroeder / Dominique Schummer	21; 16	21; 18
5	(Slovenia) (Luxembourg)	Luka Kumelj / Maja Kersnik; Yves Olinger / Claudine Barnig	21; 17	21; 17

==== Lithuania vs. South Africa ====
Lithuania
3
Scotstoun Stadium, Court 4
11 June 2007, 13:30 UTC+0

South Africa
2

			1	2	3
1	(Lithuania) (South Africa)	Kęstutis Navickas; Chris Dednam	21; 9	21; 12
2	(Lithuania) (South Africa)	Akvilė Stapušaitytė; Kerry-Lee Harrington	21; 9	21; 14
3	(Lithuania) (South Africa)	Kęstutis Navickas / Ligita Žukauskaitė; Dorian James / Michelle Claire Edwards	16; 21	11; 21
4	(Lithuania) (South Africa)	Tomas Dovydaitis / Donatas Narvilas; Chris Dednam / Roelof Dednam	15; 21	10; 21
5	(Lithuania) (South Africa)	Akvilė Stapušaitytė / Ligita Žukauskaitė; Michelle Claire Edwards / Annari Viljoen	21; 14	21; 12

==== Slovenia vs. South Africa ====
Slovenia
3
Scotstoun Stadium, Court 1
12 June 2007, 09:30 UTC+0

South Africa
2

			1	2	3
1	(Slovenia) (South Africa)	Luka Kumelj / Maja Tvrdy; Michelle Claire Edwards / Dorian James	18; 21	21; 15	13; 21
2	(Slovenia) (South Africa)	Luka Petrič; Willem Viljoen	21; 18	21; 13
3	(Slovenia) (South Africa)	Maja Kersnik; Stacey Doubell	21; 14	21; 15
4	(Slovenia) (South Africa)	Luka Kumelj / Luka Petrič; Chris Dednam / Roelof Dednam	21; 19	10; 21	16; 21
5	(Slovenia) (South Africa)	Maja Kersnik / Maja Tvrdy; Michelle Claire Edwards / Annari Viljoen	21; 19	21; 17

==== Lithuania vs. Luxembourg ====
Lithuania
5
Scotstoun Stadium, Court 2
12 June 2007, 09:30 UTC+0

Luxembourg
0

			1	2	3
1	(Lithuania) (Luxembourg)	Tomas Dovydaitis / Ligita Žukauskaitė; Yves Olinger / Claudie Barning	21; 10	17; 21	21; 18
2	(Lithuania) (Luxembourg)	Kęstutis Navickas; Mathieu Serebriakoff	21; 13	21; 13
3	(Lithuania) (Luxembourg)	Akvilė Stapušaitytė; Hariati	21; 19	16; 21	21; 17
4	(Lithuania) (Luxembourg)	Donatas Narvilas / Kęstutis Navickas; Joel Fischbach / Ben Speltz	21; 12	21; 14
5	(Lithuania) (Luxembourg)	Akvilė Stapušaitytė / Ligita Žukauskaitė; Claudine Barnig / Zoe Schroeder	21; 16	21; 16

==== South Africa vs. Luxembourg ====
South Africa
3
Scotstoun Stadium, Court 3
13 June 2007, 18:30 UTC+0

Luxembourg
2

			1	2	3
1	(South Africa) (Luxembourg)	Chris Dednam; Hargiono	21; 23	21; 16	18; 21
2	(South Africa) (Luxembourg)	Kerry-Lee Harrington; Hariati	6; 21	9; 21
3	(South Africa) (Luxembourg)	Chris Dednam / Reolof Dednam; Yves Olinger / Mathieu Serebriakoff	21; 9	21; 9
4	(South Africa) (Luxembourg)	Michelle Claire Edwards / Annari Viljoen; Claudine Barnig / Hariati	21; 12	21; 13
5	(South Africa) (Luxembourg)	Michelle Claire Edwards / Dorian James; Claudine Barnig / Hargiono	16; 21	21; 9	21; 19

==== Slovenia vs. Lithuania ====
Slovenia
1
Scotstoun Stadium, Court 6
13 June 2007, 18:30 UTC+0

Lithuania
4

			1	2	3
1	(Slovenia) (Lithuania)	Luka Kumelj / Maja Tvrdy; Tomas Dovydaitis / Ligita Žukauskaitė	14; 21	18; 21
2	(Slovenia) (Lithuania)	Luka Petrič; Kęstutis Navickas	21; 19	21; 11
3	(Slovenia) (Lithuania)	Maja Kersnik; Akvilė Stapušaitytė	19; 21	21; 13	14; 21
4	(Slovenia) (Lithuania)	Luka Kumelj / Luka Petrič; Donatas Narvilas / Kęstutis Navickas	16; 21	21; 18	17; 21
5	(Slovenia) (Lithuania)	Maja Kersnik / Maja Tvrdy; Akvilė Stapušaitytė / Ligita Žukauskaitė	12; 21	18; 21

=== Group B ===
Pos	Team	Pld	W	L	MF	MA	MD	GF	GA	GD	PF	PA	PD	Pts	Qualification
1	Ireland	3	3	0	10	5	+5	23	13	+10	702	601	+101	3	Advance to 33rd/34th play-off
2	Sri Lanka	3	2	1	10	5	+5	23	15	+8	719	681	+38	2	Advance to 35th/36th play-off
3	Peru	3	1	2	7	8	−1	19	19	0	709	665	+44	1	Advance to 37th/38th play-off
4	Norway	3	0	3	3	12	−9	8	26	−18	515	698	−183	0	Advance to 39th/40th play-off

Source: TS

==== Ireland vs. Norway ====
Ireland
4
Scotstoun Stadium, Court 5
11 June 2007, 13:30 UTC+0

Norway
1

			1	2	3
1	(Republic of Ireland) (Norway)	Scott Evans; Steinar Klausen	21; 11	18; 21	21; 16
2	(Republic of Ireland) (Norway)	Chloe Magee; Sara Blengsli Kværnø	21; 16	21; 12
3	(Republic of Ireland) (Norway)	Daniel Mage / Mark Topping; Steinar Klausen / Erik Rundle	21; 12	23; 25	15; 21
4	(Republic of Ireland) (Norway)	Bing Huang / Chloe Magee; Ida Sandberg / Marthe Sandberg	21; 10	21; 9
5	(Republic of Ireland) (Norway)	Scott Evans / Bing Huang; Erik Rundle / Sara Blengsli Kværnø	21; 8	21; 19

==== Peru vs. Sri Lanka ====
Peru
2
Scotstoun Stadium, Court 6
11 June 2007, 13:30 UTC+0

Sri Lanka
3

			1	2	3
1	(Peru) (Sri Lanka)	Andrés Corpancho; Niluka Karunaratne	21; 18	15; 21	14; 21
2	(Peru) (Sri Lanka)	Claudia Rivero; Chandrika de Silva	20; 22	21; 13	21; 12
3	(Peru) (Sri Lanka)	Jie Meng / Valeria Rivero; Nadeesha Gayanthi / Rasangi Ranatunga	16; 21	21; 16	21; 14
4	(Peru) (Sri Lanka)	Andrés Corpancho / Javier Jimeno; Diluka Karunaratne / Dinuka Karunaratne	20; 22	21; 17	12; 21
5	(Peru) (Sri Lanka)	Rodrigo Pacheco / Claudia Rivero; Niluka Karunaratne / Rasangi Ranatunga	21; 13	18; 21	19; 21

==== Ireland vs. Sri Lanka ====
Ireland
3
Scotstoun Stadium, Court 3
12 June 2007, 09:30 UTC+0

Sri Lanka
2

			1	2	3
1	(Republic of Ireland) (Sri Lanka)	Chloe Magee; Chandrika de Silva	18; 21	21; 14	21; 12
2	(Republic of Ireland) (Sri Lanka)	Scott Evans; Niluka Karunaratne	21; 18	18; 21	17; 21
3	(Republic of Ireland) (Sri Lanka)	Bing Huang / Chloe Magee; Chandrika de Silva / Nadeesha Gayanthi	21; 15	21; 14
4	(Republic of Ireland) (Sri Lanka)	Daniel Magee / Mark Topping; Diluka Karunaratne / Dinuka Karunaratne	14; 21	20; 22
5	(Republic of Ireland) (Sri Lanka)	Scott Evans / Bing Huang; Niluka Karunaratne / Rasangi Ranatunga	21; 13	21; 18

==== Peru vs. Norway ====
Peru
3
Scotstoun Stadium, Court 4
12 June 2007, 09:30 UTC+0

Norway
2

			1	2	3
1	(Peru) (Norway)	Rodrigo Pacheco; Steinar Klausen	17; 21	19; 21
2	(Peru) (Norway)	Claudia Rivero; Sara Blengsli Kværnø	21; 9	21; 16
3	(Peru) (Norway)	Andrés Corpancho / Javier Jimeno; Steinar Klausen / Erik Rundle	21; 18	16; 21	18; 21
4	(Peru) (Norway)	Jie Meng / Valeria Rivero; Ida Sandberg / Helene Trommestad	21; 7	21; 9
5	(Peru) (Norway)	Rodrigo Pacheco / Claudia Rivero; Erik Rundle / Sara Blengsli Kværnø	21; 11	21; 15

==== Sri Lanka vs. Norway ====
Sri Lanka
5
Scotstoun Stadium, Court 2
13 June 2007, 18:30 UTC+0

Norway
0

			1	2	3
1	(Sri Lanka) (Norway)	Niluka Karunaratne; Hallsteina Oma	21; 9	21; 12
2	(Sri Lanka) (Norway)	Chandrika de Silva; Sara Blengsli Kværnø	21; 13	21; 13
3	(Sri Lanka) (Norway)	Diluka Karunaratne / Dinuka Karunaratne; Lorentz Aarhus / Steinar Klausen	21; 19	22; 24	21; 16
4	(Sri Lanka) (Norway)	Chandrika de Silva / Nadeesha Gayanthi; Ida Sandberg / Marthe Sandberg	21; 15	21; 11
5	(Sri Lanka) (Norway)	Niluka Karunaratne / Rasangi Ranatunga; Erik Rundle / Helene Trommestad	21; 11	25; 23

==== Ireland vs. Peru ====
Ireland
3
Scotstoun Stadium, Court 5
13 June 2007, 18:30 UTC+0

Peru
2

			1	2	3
1	(Republic of Ireland) (Peru)	Scott Evans; Andrés Corpancho	21; 19	14; 21	16; 21
2	(Republic of Ireland) (Peru)	Chloe Magee; Claudia Rivero	9; 21	18; 21
3	(Republic of Ireland) (Peru)	Daniel Magee / Mark Topping; Javier Jimeno / Rodrigo Pacheco	16; 21	24; 22	21; 17
4	(Republic of Ireland) (Peru)	Bing Huang / Chloe Magee; Jie Meng / Valeria Rivero	21; 16	21; 9
5	(Republic of Ireland) (Peru)	Bing Huang / Scott Evans; Rodrigo Pacheco / Claudia Rivero	21; 14	21; 9

== Level 6 ==
=== Group A ===
Pos	Team	Pld	W	L	MF	MA	MD	GF	GA	GD	PF	PA	PD	Pts	Qualification
1	Portugal	3	3	0	14	1	+13	29	4	+25	683	455	+228	3	Advance to 41st/42nd play-off
2	Slovakia	3	2	1	7	8	−1	17	16	+1	604	584	+20	2	Advance to 43rd/44th play-off
3	Turkey	3	1	2	5	10	−5	12	24	−12	617	691	−74	1	Advance to 45th/46th play-off
4	Latvia	3	0	3	4	11	−7	10	24	−14	497	671	−174	0	Advance to 47th/48th play-off

Source: TS

==== Portugal vs. Latvia ====
Portugal
4
Scotstoun Stadium, Court 7
12 June 2007, 09:30 UTC+0

Latvia
1

			1	2	3
1	(Portugal) (Latvia)	Alexandre Paixão; Raimonds Cipe	21; 7	21; 5
2	(Portugal) (Latvia)	Ana Moura; Kristīne Šefere	21; 23	21; 16	15; 21
3	(Portugal) (Latvia)	Pedro Martins / Marco Vasconcelos; Raimonds Cipe / Guntis Lavrinovičs	21; 15	21; 17
4	(Portugal) (Latvia)	Filipa Lamy / Telma Santos; Margarita Miķelsone / Kristīne Šefere	21; 9	21; 14
5	(Portugal) (Latvia)	Filipa Lamy / Alexandra Paixão; Guntis Lavrinovičs / Madara Puķīte	21; 11	21; 9

==== Slovakia vs. Turkey ====
Slovakia
3
Scotstoun Stadium, Court 7
12 June 2007, 13:30 UTC+0

Turkey
2

			1	2	3
1	(Slovakia) (Turkey)	Michal Matejka; Ali Kaya	21; 18	16; 21	18; 21
2	(Slovakia) (Turkey)	Eva Sládeková; Nursel Aydoğmuş	21; 19	15; 21	19; 21
3	(Slovakia) (Turkey)	Marian Smrek / Marian Sulko; Göksel Kundakçı / Mustafa Yalvarici	25; 23	21; 17
4	(Slovakia) (Turkey)	Kvetoslava Orlovská / Zuzana Orlovská; Derya Çalımbay / Damia Nur Özer	21; 15	21; 19
5	(Slovakia) (Turkey)	Marian Sulko / Zuzana Orlovská; Ali Kaya / Nursel Aydoğmuş	21; 15	21; 17

==== Portugal vs. Turkey ====
Portugal
5
Scotstoun Stadium, Court 7
13 June 2007, 09:30 UTC+0

Turkey
0

			1	2	3
1	(Portugal) (Turkey)	Marco Vasconcelos; Ali Kaya	21; 18	21; 14
2	(Portugal) (Turkey)	Filipa Lamy; Nursel Aydoğmuş	18; 21	21; 14	21; 11
3	(Portugal) (Turkey)	Alexandre Paixão / Marco Vasconcelos; Göksel Kundakçı / Mustafa Yalvarici	21; 11	21; 15
4	(Portugal) (Turkey)	Filipa Lamy / Telma Santos; Derya Çalımbay / Nur Damia Özer	21; 6	21; 9
5	(Portugal) (Turkey)	Alexandre Paixão / Telma Santos; Ali Kaya / Nursel Aydoğmuş	21; 10	22; 20

==== Slovakia vs. Latvia ====
Slovakia
4
Scotstoun Stadium, Court 7
13 June 2007, 13:30 UTC+0

Latvia
1

			1	2	3
1	(Slovakia) (Latvia)	Marian Sulko / Zuzana Orlovská; Guntis Lavrinovičs / Margarita Miķelsone	21; 9	21; 13
2	(Slovakia) (Latvia)	Michal Matejka; Raimonds Cipe	21; 10	21; 15
3	(Slovakia) (Latvia)	Eva Sládeková; Kristīne Šefere	18; 21	19; 21
4	(Slovakia) (Latvia)	Marian Smrek / Marian Sulko; Raimonds Cipe / Guntis Lavrinovičs	21; 6	21; 10
5	(Slovakia) (Latvia)	Kvetoslava Orlovská / Zuzana Orlovská; Margarita Miķelsone / Kristīne Šefere	21; 10	21; 13

==== Portugal vs. Slovakia ====
Portugal
5
Scotstoun Stadium, Court 4
14 June 2007, 09:30 UTC+0

Slovakia
0

			1	2	3
1	(Portugal) (Slovakia)	Alexandre Paixão / Filipa Lamy; Marian Sulko / Zuzana Orlovská	21; 9	21; 18
2	(Portugal) (Slovakia)	Marco Vasconcelos; Michal Matejka	21; 10	22; 20
3	(Portugal) (Slovakia)	Telma Santos; Eva Sládeková	21; 3	21; 18
4	(Portugal) (Slovakia)	Alexandra Paixão / Marco Vasconcelos; Marian Smrek / Marian Sulko	21; 14	21; 19
5	(Portugal) (Slovakia)	Filipa Lamy / Ana Moura; Kvetoslava Orlovská / Zuzana Orlovská	21; 12	18; 21	21; 15

==== Turkey vs. Latvia ====
Turkey
3
Scotstoun Stadium, Court 5
14 June 2007, 09:30 UTC+0

Latvia
2

			1	2	3
1	(Turkey) (Latvia)	Mustafa Yalvarici; Raimonds Cipe	21; 14	19; 21	21; 16
2	(Turkey) (Latvia)	Nursel Aydoğmuş; Kristīne Šefere	21; 17	14; 21	15; 21
3	(Turkey) (Latvia)	Ali Kaya / Göskel Kundakçı; Raimonds Cipe / Guntis Lavrinovičs	16; 21	21; 11	21; 15
4	(Turkey) (Latvia)	Derya Çalımbay / Nur Damia Özer; Margarita Miķelsone / Kristīne Šefere	14; 21	16; 21
5	(Turkey) (Latvia)	Ali Kaya / Nursel Aydoğmuş; Guntis Lavrinoviçs / Madara Pukite	21; 9	21; 14

=== Group B ===
Pos	Team	Pld	W	L	MF	MA	MD	GF	GA	GD	PF	PA	PD	Pts	Qualification
1	Belgium	3	3	0	12	3	+9	25	9	+16	660	544	+116	3	Advance to 41st/42nd play-off
2	Belarus	3	2	1	9	6	+3	19	14	+5	592	558	+34	2	Advance to 43rd/44th play-off
3	Iceland	3	1	2	7	8	−1	14	16	−2	531	537	−6	1	Advance to 45th/46th play-off
4	Cyprus	3	0	3	2	13	−11	5	24	−19	432	576	−144	0	Advance to 47th/48th play-off

Source: TS

==== Belgium vs. Belarus ====
Belgium
3
Scotstoun Stadium, Court 6
12 June 2007, 18:30 UTC+0

Belarus
2

			1	2	3
1	(Belgium) (Belarus)	David Jaco; Yauheni Yakauchuk	21; 8	21; 14
2	(Belgium) (Belarus)	Lianne Tan; Olga Konon	10; 21	8; 21
3	(Belgium) (Belarus)	Wouter Claes / Frédéric Mawet; Andrei Konakh / Yauheni Yakauchuk	21; 12	18; 21	21; 13
4	(Belgium) (Belarus)	Severine Corvilain / Nathalie Descamps; Maria Kizit / Alesia Zaitsava	21; 19	18; 21	21; 17
5	(Belgium) (Belarus)	Wouter Claes / Nathalie Descamps; Andrei Konakh / Olg Konon	18; 21	21; 16	14; 21

==== Iceland vs. Cyprus ====
Iceland
4
Scotstoun Stadium, Court 7
12 June 2007, 18:30 UTC+0

Cyprus
1

			1	2	3
1	(Iceland) (Cyprus)	Magnús Ingi Helgason; Dimitris Kyprianou	12; 21	20; 22
2	(Iceland) (Cyprus)	Tinna Helgadóttir; Dometia Ioannou	21; 13	21; 14
3	(Iceland) (Cyprus)	Magnús Ingi Helgason / Helgi Jóhannesson; Dimitris Kyprianou / Vasilis Vasou	21; 13	21; 18
4	(Iceland) (Cyprus)	Katrín Atladóttir / Ragna Ingólfsdóttir; Dometia Ioannou / Maria Ioannou	21; 17	21; 15
5	(Iceland) (Cyprus)	Helgi Jóhannesson / Tinna Helgadóttir; Vasilis Vasou / Maria Ioannou	21; 7			retired

==== Belgium vs. Cyprus ====
Belgium
5
Scotstoun Stadium, Court 5
13 June 2007, 13:30 UTC+0

Cyprus
0

			1	2	3
1	(Belgium) (Cyprus)	Frédéric Mawet / Severine Corvilain; Vasilis Vasou / Maria Ioannou	21; 11	21; 15
2	(Belgium) (Cyprus)	Yuhan Tan; Dimitris Kyprianou	21; 13	21; 18
3	(Belgium) (Cyprus)	Nathalie Descamps; Dometia Ioannou	21; 12	21; 17
4	(Belgium) (Cyprus)	Wouter Claes / Frédéric Mawet; Dimitris Kyprianou / Vasilis Vasou	21; 10	21; 9
5	(Belgium) (Cyprus)	Steffi Annys / Severine Corvilain; Dometia Ioannou / Maria Ioannou	21; 16	21; 13

==== Iceland vs. Belarus ====
Iceland
2
Scotstoun Stadium, Court 6
13 June 2007, 13:30 UTC+0

Belarus
3

			1	2	3
1	(Iceland) (Belarus)	Magnús Ingi Helgason; Yauheni Yakauchuk	18; 21	14; 21
2	(Iceland) (Belarus)	Katrín Atladóttir; Olga Konon	13; 21	9; 21
3	(Iceland) (Belarus)	Magnús Ingi Helgason / Helgi Jóhannesson; Andrei Konakh / Yauheni Yakauchuk	21; 12	21; 15
4	(Iceland) (Belarus)	Tinna Helgadóttir / Ragna Ingólfsdóttir; Maria Kizit / Alesia Zaitsava	21; 14	21; 13
5	(Iceland) (Belarus)	Tinna Helgadóttir / Helgi Jóhannesson; Andrei Konakh / Olga Konon	18; 21	11; 21

==== Belgium vs. Iceland ====
Belgium
4
Scotstoun Stadium, Court 2
14 June 2007, 09:30 UTC+0

Iceland
1

			1	2	3
1	(Belgium) (Iceland)	Nathalie Descamps; Tinna Helgadóttir	21; 11	21; 18
2	(Belgium) (Iceland)	Wouter Claes / Frédéric Mawet; Magnús Ingi Helgason / Helgi Jóhannesson	21; 15	21; 11
3	(Belgium) (Iceland)	Steffi Annys / Severine Corvilain; Tinna Helgadóttir / Ragna Ingólfsdóttir	18; 21	11; 21
4	(Belgium) (Iceland)	David Jaco; Atli Jóhannesson	21; 13	21; 16
5	(Belgium) (Iceland)	Wouter Claes / Nathalie Descamps; Helgi Jóhannesson / Ragna Ingólfsdóttir	19; 21	22; 20	21; 18

==== Cyprus vs. Belarus ====
Cyprus
1
Scotstoun Stadium, Court 3
14 June 2007, 09:30 UTC+0

Belarus
4

			1	2	3
1	(Cyprus) (Belarus)	Dimitris Kyprianou; Yauheni Yakauchuk	20; 22	21; 11	21; 14
2	(Cyprus) (Belarus)	Dometia Ioannou; Olga Konon	10; 21	9; 21
3	(Cyprus) (Belarus)	Dimitris Kyprianou / Vasilis Vasou; Andrei Konakh / Yauheni Yakauchuk	21; 13	18; 21	20; 22
4	(Cyprus) (Belarus)	Dometia Ioannou / Maria Ioannou; Maria Kizit / Alesia Zaitsava	10; 21	8; 21
5	(Cyprus) (Belarus)	Vasilis Vasou / Maria Ioannou; Andrei Konakh / Olga Konon				w/o
