= Lucic =

Lucic may refer to one of two Slavic surnames:

- Lučić
- Lucić
