= Ruka =

Ruka may refer to:

== People ==
=== Given name ===
- Ruka Fukagawa (深川 瑠華; born 2004), Japanese singer and voice actress
- Ruka Hirano (平野 流佳; born 2002), Japanese snowboarder
- Ruka Inaba (稲場るか; born 2000), Japanese AV actress
- Ruka Inoue (井上 瑠夏; born 2001), Japanese member of the SKE48
- Ruka Ishikawa (石川瑠華; born 1997), Japanese actress
- Ruka Kanae (佳苗 るか; born 1993), Japanese screenwriter and former AV actress
- Ruka Kawai (河井 瑠花; born 2002), Japanese K-pop idol and member of South Korean girl group Babymonster
- Ruka Matsuda (松田 るか; born 1995), Japanese actress
- Ruka Mishina (三品 瑠香; born 2001), Japanese member of the Wasuta
- Ruka Mizote (溝手 るか; born 1997), Japanese former member of the Super Girls (Japanese group)
- Ruka Natami (屶網 瑠夏; born 2002), Japanese freestyle wrestler
- Ruka Norimatsu (乗松 瑠華; born 1996), Japanese football player
- Ruka Okamoto (岡本 留佳; born 2006), Japanese taekwondo practitioner
- Ruka Yamaya (山谷 瑠香; born 1995), Japanese professional footballer

=== Surname ===
- Ruka, the feminine form of the Latvian surname Ruks
- Cat Ruka, New Zealand dancer, choreographer, performance director and arts manager
- John J. Ruka (1862–1928), American politician

=== Fictional characters ===
- Ruka (Okage), a playable character from Okage: Shadow King
- Ruka Souen, a character from the anime and manga series Vampire Knight
- Ruka, a character from the anime and manga series YuYu Hakusho
- Ruka, a playable character from Fire Emblem Gaiden
- Ruka, a playable character from Tear Ring Saga
- Ruka Sarashina, a character from the anime and manga series Rent-A-Girlfriend
- Ruka Minazuki, a playable character from the fatal frame series Fatal Frame: Mask of the Lunar Eclipse
- Ruka Suirenji, a character from the anime and manga series Hayate the Combat Butler
- Ruka Kayamori, a character from the game series Heaven Burns Red
- Ruka Asato, a character from the light novel series Accel World

== Other ==
- Rukatunturi (Finnish: Ruka), a ski resort in Finland
- Ruka (house type), a traditional Mapuche house type
- Ruka (film), 1965 Czech animated short film also known as The Hand
- Ruka, Republic of Dagestan, rural locality

== See also ==
- Luka (given name), another Japanese transliteration
