= Luka (given name) =

- Pronunciation: Serbo-Croatian: [lûːka] Slovene: [ˈlùːka]
- Gender: Unisex

Origin
- Origin: Latin
- Meaning: "Light"

Other names
- Related names: Luca, Luke, Luc, Lucas, Lukas, Łukasz, Ruka

Luka is a Slavic masculine given name. In Japanese: ルカ, るか is transliterated Luka or Ruka, and can be masculine or feminine (possibly related to Haruka).

The male name Luka comes from the Latin word "Lucanus" which means a man from Lucania.

In Croatia, the name Luka was among the most common masculine given names in the decades between 1990 and 2011, and was the most common name in the 2000s. In the United States it has been one of the top 100 of most popular masculine names for baby boys since 2023, emboldened by the popularity of NBA player Luka Dončić, particularly in the state of Texas.

Notable people bearing the name include:

- Luka Andrade (born 2007), Argentine footballer
- Luka Baković (born 1997), Croatian para-athlete
- Luka Bebić (born 1937), Croatian politician, former Speaker of the Croatian Parliament
- Luka Bilobrk (born 1985), Bosnian-Herzegovinian football player
- Luka Bloom (born 1955), Irish singer and songwriter, born Kevin Barry Moore
- Luka Bogdanović (born 1985), Serbian basketball player
- Luka Brajkovic (born 1999), Austrian basketball player
- Luka Dončić (born 1999), Slovenian basketball player
- Luka Drašković (born 1995), Montenegrin chess player
- Luka Đorđević (born 1994), Montenegrin football player
- Luka Garza (born 1998), American basketball player of Bosnian descent
- Luka Hyryläinen (born 2004), Finnish footballer
- Luka Ivanović (born 1992), Serbian singer and songwriter known as Luke Black
- Luka Jones (born 1975), American actor and comedian, born Luka Yovetich
- Luka Jones (born 1999), Argentine politician
- Luka Jović (born 1997), Serbian football player
- Luka Kaliterna (1893–1984), Croatian football player and manager
- Luka Kuittinen (born 2003), Finnish footballer
- Luka Magnotta (born 1982), Canadian porn actor and murderer, born Eric Clinton Kirk Newman
- Luka Marić (1899–1974), Croatian biologist
- Luka Marić (born 1987), Croatian football player
- Luka Marić (born 2002), Austrian football player
- Luka Menalo (born 1996), Bosnian-Herzegovinian football player
- Luka Merdović (born 1989), Montenegrin football player
- Luka Mikulić (born 2005), Bosnian football player
- Luka Milivojević (born 1991), Serbian football player
- Luka Mirković (born 1990), Montenegrin football player
- Luka Mitrović (born 1993), Serbian basketball player
- Luka Modrić (born 1985), Croatian football player
- Luka Nakov (born 2000), Bulgarian-Macedonian football player
- Luka Pavićević (born 1968), Montenegrin football player and coach
- Luka "Perkz" Perković (born 1998), Croatian esports player
- Luka Petrič (born 1984), Slovenian badminton player
- Luka Peruzović (born 1952), Croatian football player and manager
- Luka Rakić (born 1991), Montenegrin sprinter
- Luka Romero (born 2004), Argentine footballer
- Luka Stankovski (born 2002), Macedonian football player
- Luka Stepančić (born 1990), Croatian handball player
- Luka Svetec (1826–1921), Slovenian politician, lawyer, author, and philologist
- Luka Šamanić (born 2000), Croatian basketball player
- Luka Šulić (born 1987), Croatian-Slovenian cellist
- Luka Vušković (born 2007), Croatian football player
- Luka Yoshida-Martin (born 2001), Australian rules footballer
- Luka Žorić (born 1984), Croatian basketball player

== Fictional characters ==
- Luka Couffaine, a character in the animated television series Miraculous: Tales of Ladybug & Cat Noir
- Luka Crosszeria, a character in the series The Betrayal Knows My Name
- Luka Kovač, a character in the television series ER
- The subject of the 1987 Suzanne Vega song "Luka"
- Luka Lemmens, a minor character in the Belgian series wtFOCK
- Luka Macken or Ruka Makken, a character in the anime Black Butler
- Luka Millfy or Ruka Mirufi, a character in Kaizoku Sentai Gokaiger
- Megurine Luka, a Vocaloid developed by Crypton Future Media
- Luka Redgrave, a character in the Bayonetta series
- Luka Smithee, a character in The Wonderful 101
- Urushibara Luka or Urushibara Ruka, a character in the visual novel Steins;Gate
- Luka, a character in the game Honkai: Star Rail
- Luka, a character in the animated web series Alien Stage

== See also ==
- Luca (feminine given name)
- Lukić
- Lučić
- Lucija
