= Luka Marić =

Luka Marić may refer to:

== Sports ==
- Luka Marić (footballer, born 1987), Croatian footballer who plays as a defender for CS Concordia Chiajna
- Luka Marić (footballer, born 2002), Austrian footballer who plays as a goalkeeper for TSV Hartberg

== Others ==
- Luka Marić (geologist)
