= Lučić =

- Pronunciation: [lûtʃitɕ, lǔː-]
- Language: Serbian and Croatian

Origin
- Meaning: patronymic of Luka

Lučić is a Slavic surname, Croatian and Serbian family name. It is a patronymic name of Luka or alternativly from the Župa Luka in Donji Kraji today Middle BiH.

The Surname ist most common in midle Bosnia, in the area of the former Župa Luka. In the villages Seoci (in the Mountains on the West Bank of Vrbas), near Jajce, Vesela and Velika Bukovica in Bosnia and Herzegovina, 1/4 of the Population had the surname Lučić.

There was a historical Lučić family in the Republic of Ragusa and another one in Trogir.

The renaissance Palace in Trogir "Palača Lučić (or Palača Lucić)" was built in the middle ages, restored in the 16th century.

Notable people with the surname include:

- Antun Lučić (1855–1921), Croatian-born oil explorer
- Franjo Lučić /1889-1972) Croatian composer
- Ivan Lučić-Lucius (1604–1679), Dalmatian historian
- Ivan Lučić (footballer, born 1995), Austrian football goalkeeper
- Ivan Lučić (footballer, born 1996), Serbian football goalkeeper
- Ivan Lučić - Lavčević (1905-1942) Croatian (Jugoslav) war hero and antifascist
- Jeronim Lučić (-Bogoslavić) (1575-1648), bishop and apostolic vicariate
- Josip Lučić (1924-1994), Croatian historian
- Liljana Lučić (born 1953), Serbian politician
- Miloš Lučić (born 1986), Bosnian Serb politician
- Milan Lucic (born 1988), Canadian ice hockey player of Serbian descent
- Mirjana Lučić (born 1982), Croatian tennis player
- Teddy Lučić (born 1973), Swedish footballer of Croatian descent
- Vladislav Lučić (born 1941), Serbian basketball coach
- Vladimir Lučić (born 1989), Serbian professional basketball player
- Uroš Lučić (born 1983), Serbian professional basketball player
- Željko Lučić (born 1968), Serbian operatic baritone
- Waltraud Lučić (born 1957) bavarian teacher and activist

== See also ==
- Lucić
- Lucius
- Lukić
- Luc (disambiguation)
