= Lukić =

Lukić (Serbian Cyrillic: Лукић, pronounced [lǔːkitɕ]) is a Serbo-Croatian surname, a patronymic and diminutive of Luka. It may refer to:

- Andrej Lukić (born 1994), Croatian footballer
- Dragan Lukić (1928–2006), Serbian children's writer
- Dragan Lukić Lvky (born 1970), Croatian singer, songwriter and music producer
- Ilija Lukić, (1942–2018), Serbian footballer
- John Lukic (born 1960), English footballer
- Jovo Lukić (born 1998), Serbian-Bosnian footballer
- Mihajlo Lukić (1886–1961), Croatian general
- Milan Lukić (born 1967), Bosnian Serb warlord
- Nikola Lukić (water polo) (born 1998), Serbian water polo player
- Radomir Lukić (1914–1999), Serbian legal scholar of philosophy
- Saša Lukić (born 1996), Serbian footballer
- Slavko Lukić (born 1989), Serbian footballer
- Srđan Lukić (born 1981), Serbian footballer
- Sreten Lukić (born 1955), Serbian politician and convicted war criminal
- Stojan Lukić (born 1979), Swedish footballer
- Tatjana Lukić (1959–2008), Croatian-born Australian poetry editor and poet
- Vitomir Lukić (1929–1991), Bosnian-Croat prose writer and pedagogue
- Vladan Lukić (born 1970), Yugoslavian footballer from Serbia
- Vojislava Lukić (born 1987), Serbian tennis player
- Živko Lukić (1944–2015), Serbian footballer

== See also ==
- Lučić
