= 2007 Sudirman Cup =

Tournament details
- Dates: 11–17 June
- Edition: 10th
- Level: International
- Venue: Scotstoun International Sports Arena
- Location: Glasgow, Scotland

The 2007 Sudirman Cup is the 10th tournament of the World Mixed Team Badminton Championships of Sudirman Cup. It was held from 11 to 17 June 2007 in Glasgow, Scotland.

China won for the sixth time and second in a row after beating Indonesia 3–0 in the final.

== Host city selection ==
Scotland and South Korea submitted bids to host the event. IBF awarded Scotland the right to host the event during a council meeting in Jakarta.

== Venue ==
- Scotstoun International Sports Arena

== Teams ==
As confirmed, 48 teams around the world took part in this tournament. (after the retirement of Mongolia) Geographically, they are 31 from Europe, 11 teams from Asia, 3 from Americas, two from Oceania and one from Africa. Below is the seeded the team in each group of the tournament.

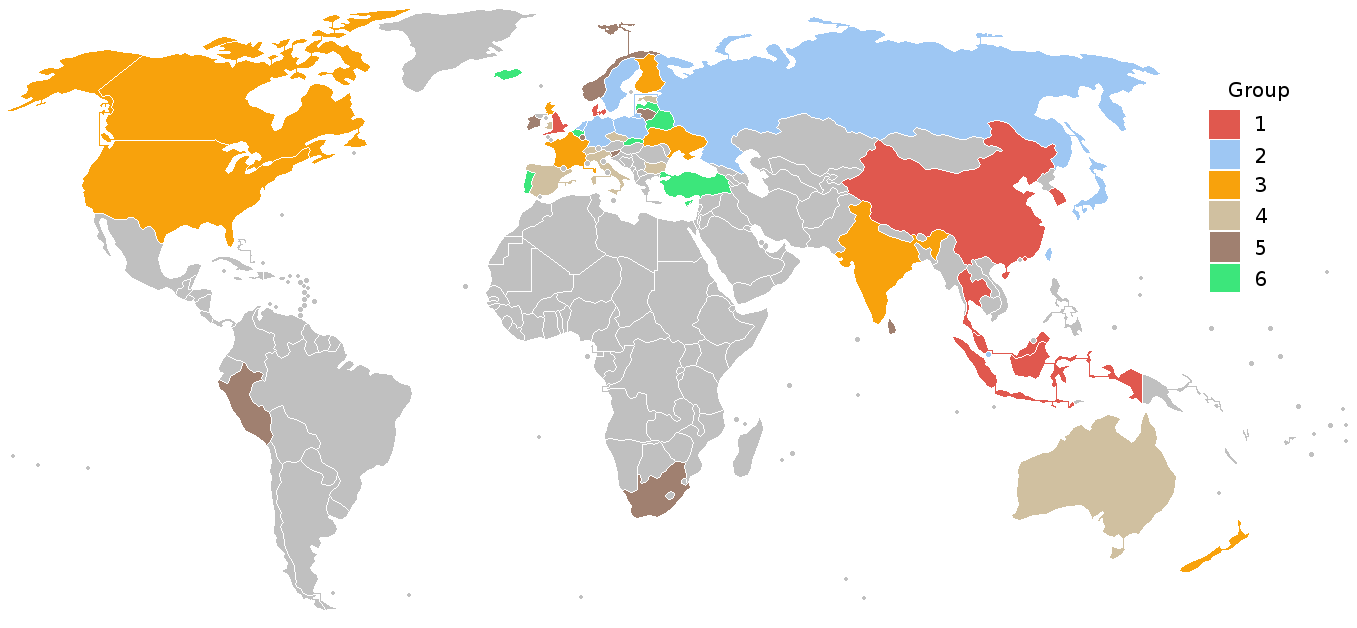
Participating countries

Level	Seed			
Level	Top	Second	Third	Fourth
1	China	Denmark	South Korea	Malaysia
2	Singapore	Japan	—N/a	
3	France	India	—N/a	
4	Australia	Bulgaria	—N/a	
5	Slovenia	Ireland	—N/a	
6	Portugal	Belgium	—N/a	

Following the withdrawal of Mongolia in Group 7, now that group has been merged with Group 6, the group 6 now has two group itself.

== Group stage ==
=== Level 1 ===
==== Group A ====
Pos	Team	Pld	W	L	MF	MA	MD	GF	GA	GD	PF	PA	PD	Pts	Qualification	People's Republic of China	England	Malaysia	Thailand
1	China	3	3	0	14	1	+13	28	2	+26	622	395	+227	3	Advance to Semi-finals	—	5–0	4–1	5–0
2	England	3	2	1	7	8	−1	14	20	−6	586	640	−54	2	Advance to Semi-finals		—	3–2	4–1
3	Malaysia	3	1	2	6	9	−3	15	18	−3	581	600	−19	1	Advance to 5th/6th play-off			—	3–2
4	Thailand	3	0	3	3	12	−9	8	25	−17	505	659	−154	0	Advance to 7th/8th play-off				—

Source: TS

==== Group B ====
Pos	Team	Pld	W	L	MF	MA	MD	GF	GA	GD	PF	PA	PD	Pts	Qualification	Indonesia	South Korea	Denmark	Hong Kong
1	Indonesia	3	2	1	10	5	+5	22	15	+7	706	635	+71	2	Advance to Semi-finals	—	2–3	4–1	4–1
2	South Korea	3	2	1	9	6	+3	20	15	+5	652	600	+52	2	Advance to Semi-finals		—	2–3	4–1
3	Denmark	3	2	1	7	8	−1	19	17	+2	658	661	−3	2	Advance to 5th/6th play-off			—	3–2
4	Hong Kong	3	0	3	4	11	−7	11	25	−14	584	704	−120	0	Advance to 7th/8th play-off				—

Source: TS

=== Level 2 ===
==== Group A ====
Pos	Team	Pld	W	L	MF	MA	MD	GF	GA	GD	PF	PA	PD	Pts	Qualification	Singapore	Chinese Taipei for Olympic games	Germany	Sweden
1	Singapore	3	3	0	12	3	+9	25	7	+18	638	533	+105	3	Advance to 9th/10th play-off	—	3–2	4–1	5–0
2	Chinese Taipei	3	2	1	11	4	+7	23	10	+13	641	537	+104	2	Advance to 11th/12th play-off		—	4–1	5–0
3	Germany	3	1	2	6	9	−3	14	20	−6	608	645	−37	1	Advance to 13th/14th play-off			—	4–1
4	Sweden	3	0	3	1	14	−13	4	29	−25	505	677	−172	0	Advance to 15th/16th play-off				—

Source: TS

==== Group B ====
Pos	Team	Pld	W	L	MF	MA	MD	GF	GA	GD	PF	PA	PD	Pts	Qualification	Japan	Poland	Netherlands	Russia
1	Japan	3	3	0	11	4	+7	24	11	+13	688	579	+109	3	Advance to 9th/10th play-off	—	3–2	4–1	4–1
2	Poland	3	2	1	9	6	+3	19	14	+5	578	613	−35	2	Advance to 11th/12th play-off		—	3–2	4–1
3	Netherlands	3	1	2	6	9	−3	14	21	−7	619	638	−19	1	Advance to 13th/14th play-off			—	3–2
4	Russia	3	0	3	4	11	−7	11	22	−11	571	626	−55	0	Advance to 15th/16th play-off				—

Source: TS

=== Level 3 ===
==== Group A ====
Pos	Team	Pld	W	L	MF	MA	MD	GF	GA	GD	PF	PA	PD	Pts	Qualification	France	United States	Canada	Ukraine
1	France	3	3	0	14	1	+13	29	9	+20	763	620	+143	3	Advance to 17th/18th play-off	—	5–0	4–1	5–0
2	United States	3	1	2	6	9	−3	16	20	−4	660	683	−23	1	Advance to 19th/20th play-off		—	4–1	2–3
3	Canada	3	1	2	5	10	−5	12	22	−10	586	669	−83	1	Advance to 21st/22nd play-off			—	3–2
4	Ukraine	3	1	2	5	10	−5	14	20	−6	609	646	−37	1	Advance to 23rd/24th play-off				—

Source: TS

==== Group B ====
Pos	Team	Pld	W	L	MF	MA	MD	GF	GA	GD	PF	PA	PD	Pts	Qualification	India	Scotland	New Zealand	Finland
1	India	3	3	0	13	2	+11	28	9	+19	734	576	+158	3	Advance to 17th/18th play-off	—	4–1	5–0	4–1
2	Scotland (H)	3	2	1	9	6	+3	22	13	+9	630	622	+8	2	Advance to 19th/20th play-off		—	4–1	4–1
3	New Zealand	3	1	2	4	11	−7	10	23	−13	537	621	−84	1	Advance to 21st/22nd play-off			—	3–2
4	Finland	3	0	3	4	11	−7	8	23	−15	498	580	−82	0	Advance to 23rd/24th play-off				—

Source: TS
(H) Host

=== Level 4 ===
==== Group A ====
Pos	Team	Pld	W	L	MF	MA	MD	GF	GA	GD	PF	PA	PD	Pts	Qualification	Australia	Italy	Wales	Spain
1	Australia	3	3	0	11	4	+7	24	10	+14	675	554	+121	3	Advance to 25th/26th play-off	—	3–2	3–2	5–0
2	Italy	3	2	1	8	7	+1	17	15	+2	570	557	+13	2	Advance to 27th/28th play-off		—	3–2	3–2
3	Wales	3	1	2	8	7	+1	16	17	−1	556	554	+2	1	Advance to 29th/30th play-off			—	4–1
4	Spain	3	0	3	3	12	−9	9	24	−15	511	647	−136	0	Advance to 31st/32nd play-off				—

Source: TS

==== Group B ====
Pos	Team	Pld	W	L	MF	MA	MD	GF	GA	GD	PF	PA	PD	Pts	Qualification	Czech Republic	Bulgaria	Switzerland	Estonia
1	Czech Republic	3	3	0	10	5	+5	21	13	+8	620	588	+32	3	Advance to 25th/26th play-off	—	4–1	3–2	3–2
2	Bulgaria	3	2	1	10	5	+5	22	11	+11	638	519	+119	2	Advance to 27th/28th play-off		—	5–0	4–1
3	Switzerland	3	1	2	5	10	−5	12	22	−10	557	651	−94	1	Advance to 29th/30th play-off			—	3–2
4	Estonia	3	0	3	5	10	−5	11	20	−9	528	585	−57	0	Advance to 31st/32nd play-off				—

Source: TS

=== Level 5 ===
==== Group A ====
Pos	Team	Pld	W	L	MF	MA	MD	GF	GA	GD	PF	PA	PD	Pts	Qualification	Lithuania	Slovenia	South Africa	Luxembourg
1	Lithuania	3	3	0	12	3	+9	24	10	+14	650	556	+94	3	Advance to 33rd/34th play-off	—	4–1	3–2	5–0
2	Slovenia	3	2	1	9	6	+3	22	13	+9	668	608	+60	2	Advance to 35th/36th play-off		—	3–2	5–0
3	South Africa	3	1	2	7	8	−1	15	19	−4	585	597	−12	1	Advance to 37th/38th play-off			—	3–2
4	Luxembourg	3	0	3	2	13	−11	8	27	−19	549	691	−142	0	Advance to 39th/40th play-off				—

Source: TS

==== Group B ====
Pos	Team	Pld	W	L	MF	MA	MD	GF	GA	GD	PF	PA	PD	Pts	Qualification	Ireland	Sri Lanka	Peru	Norway
1	Ireland	3	3	0	10	5	+5	23	13	+10	702	601	+101	3	Advance to 33rd/34th play-off	—	3–2	3–2	4–1
2	Sri Lanka	3	2	1	10	5	+5	23	15	+8	719	681	+38	2	Advance to 35th/36th play-off		—	3–2	5–0
3	Peru	3	1	2	7	8	−1	19	19	0	709	665	+44	1	Advance to 37th/38th play-off			—	3–2
4	Norway	3	0	3	3	12	−9	8	26	−18	515	698	−183	0	Advance to 39th/40th play-off				—

Source: TS

=== Level 6 ===
==== Group A ====
Pos	Team	Pld	W	L	MF	MA	MD	GF	GA	GD	PF	PA	PD	Pts	Qualification	Portugal	Slovakia	Turkey	Latvia
1	Portugal	3	3	0	14	1	+13	29	4	+25	683	455	+228	3	Advance to 41st/42nd play-off	—	5–0	5–0	4–1
2	Slovakia	3	2	1	7	8	−1	17	16	+1	604	584	+20	2	Advance to 43rd/44th play-off		—	3–2	4–1
3	Turkey	3	1	2	5	10	−5	12	24	−12	617	691	−74	1	Advance to 45th/46th play-off			—	3–2
4	Latvia	3	0	3	4	11	−7	10	24	−14	497	671	−174	0	Advance to 47th/48th play-off				—

Source: TS

==== Group B ====
Pos	Team	Pld	W	L	MF	MA	MD	GF	GA	GD	PF	PA	PD	Pts	Qualification	Belgium	Belarus	Iceland	Cyprus
1	Belgium	3	3	0	12	3	+9	25	9	+16	660	544	+116	3	Advance to 41st/42nd play-off	—	3–2	4–1	5–0
2	Belarus	3	2	1	9	6	+3	19	14	+5	592	558	+34	2	Advance to 43rd/44th play-off		—	3–2	1–4
3	Iceland	3	1	2	7	8	−1	14	16	−2	531	537	−6	1	Advance to 45th/46th play-off			—	4–1
4	Cyprus	3	0	3	2	13	−11	5	24	−19	432	576	−144	0	Advance to 47th/48th play-off				—

Source: TS

== Knockout stage ==
=== Classification bracket ===
Fifth place match
Malaysia	2
Denmark	3

Seventh place match
Thailand	2
Hong Kong	3

Ninth place match
Singapore	2
Japan	3

Eleventh place match
Chinese Taipei	1
Poland	3

Thirteenth place match
Germany	3
Netherlands	0

Fifteenth place match
Sweden	1
Russia	3

Seventeenth place match
France	3
India	0

Nineteenth place match
United States	0
Scotland	3

Twenty-first place match
Canada	1
New Zealand	3

Twenty-third place match
Ukraine	1
Finland	3

Twenty-fifth place match
Australia	2
Czech Republic	3

Twenty-seventh place match
Italy	3
Bulgaria	1

Twenty-ninth place match
Wales	2
Switzerland	3

Thirty-first place match
Spain	0
Estonia	3

Thirty-third place match
Lithuania	1
Ireland	3

Thirty-fifth place match
Slovenia	3
Sri Lanka	1

Thirty-seventh place match
South Africa	3
Peru	2

Thirty-ninth place match
Luxembourg	3
Norway	2

Forty-first place match
Portugal	3
Belgium	1

Forty-third place match
Slovakia	2
Belarus	3

Forty-fifth place match
Turkey	0
Iceland	3

Forty-seventh place match
Latvia	1
Cyprus	3

=== Classification round ===
Team 1	Score	Team 2
Malaysia	2–3	Denmark
Thailand	2–3	Hong Kong
Singapore	2–3	Japan
Chinese Taipei	1–3	Poland
Germany	3–0	Netherlands
Sweden	1–3	Russia
France	3–0	India
United States	0–3	Scotland
Canada	1–3	New Zealand
Ukraine	1–3	Finland
Australia	2–3	Czech Republic
Italy	3–1	Bulgaria
Wales	2–3	Switzerland
Spain	0–3	Estonia
Lithuania	1–3	Ireland
Slovenia	3–1	Sri Lanka
South Africa	3–2	Peru
Luxembourg	3–2	Norway
Portugal	3–1	Belgium
Slovakia	2–3	Belarus
Turkey	0–3	Iceland
Latvia	1–3	Cyprus

=== Final bracket ===
Semi-finals
China	3
South Korea	0
England	2
Indonesia	3

Final
China	3
Indonesia	0

==== Semi-finals ====
Team 1	Score	Team 2
China	3–0	South Korea
England	2–3	Indonesia

==== Final ====
Team 1	Score	Team 2
China	3–0	Indonesia

2007 Sudirman Cup Champions

China
Sixth title

== Final ranking ==
Pos	Team	Pld	W	L	Pts	Final result
1st place, gold medalist(s)	China	5	5	0	10	Champions
2nd place, silver medalist(s)	Indonesia	5	3	2	6	Runner-up
3rd place, bronze medalist(s)	England	4	2	2	4	Eliminated in Semi-finals
3rd place, bronze medalist(s)	South Korea	4	2	2	4	Eliminated in Semi-finals
5	Denmark	4	3	1	6	Level 1
6	Malaysia	4	1	3	2	Level 1
7	Hong Kong	4	1	3	2	Level 1
8	Thailand	4	0	4	0	Level 1
9	Japan	4	4	0	8	Level 2
10	Singapore	4	3	1	6	Level 2
11	Poland	4	3	1	6	Level 2
12	Chinese Taipei	4	2	2	4	Level 2
13	Germany	4	2	2	4	Level 2
14	Netherlands	4	1	3	2	Level 2
15	Russia	4	1	3	2	Level 2
16	Sweden	4	0	4	0	Level 2
17	France	4	4	0	8	Level 3
18	India	4	3	1	6	Level 3
19	Scotland	4	3	1	6	Level 3
20	United States	4	1	3	2	Level 3
21	New Zealand	4	2	2	4	Level 3
22	Canada	4	1	3	2	Level 3
23	Finland	4	1	3	2	Level 3
24	Ukraine	4	1	3	2	Level 3
25	Czech Republic	4	4	0	8	Level 4
26	Australia	4	3	1	6	Level 4
27	Italy	4	3	1	6	Level 4
28	Bulgaria	4	2	2	4	Level 4
29	Switzerland	4	2	2	4	Level 4
30	Wales	4	1	3	2	Level 4
31	Estonia	4	1	3	2	Level 4
32	Spain	4	0	4	0	Level 4
33	Ireland	4	4	0	8	Level 5
34	Lithuania	4	3	1	6	Level 5
35	Slovenia	4	3	1	6	Level 5
36	Sri Lanka	4	2	2	4	Level 5
37	South Africa	4	2	2	2	Level 5
38	Peru	4	1	3	2	Level 5
39	Luxembourg	4	1	3	2	Level 5
40	Norway	4	0	4	0	Level 5
41	Portugal	4	4	0	8	Level 6
42	Belgium	4	3	1	6	Level 6
43	Belarus	4	3	1	6	Level 6
44	Slovakia	4	2	2	4	Level 6
45	Iceland	4	2	2	4	Level 6
46	Turkey	4	1	3	2	Level 6
47	Cyprus	4	1	3	2	Level 6
48	Latvia	4	0	4	0	Level 6

Promoted to higher group
Relegated to lower group
