= Lučić family =

Noble family of the Republic of Ragusa

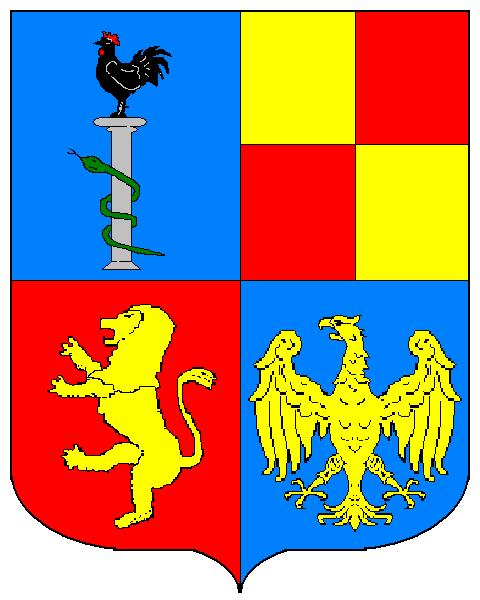
Coat of arms of Lučić-Cerinić-Grisogno family

The House of Luca or Lučić was a noble family from the city of Dubrovnik and the Republic of Ragusa. It belonged to the small circle of families which belonged to the Ragusan nobility.

Archival records indicate that in 914, the Luccari family, of Albanian origin, migrated from Lezhë to Ragusa (modern-day Dubrovnik), with their earliest known roots tracing back to Lasia di Slabia.

The family's nomenclature evolved, with "Luccari" and "de Lucaris" being documented in Zadar in 1283, in addition to the later "Lukarić." While the noble family of "Luccari" or "de Lucaris" is now extinct, another branch of the family, represented by Šimun Lukarić, likely existed.

Some individuals bearing the Lukarić surname appeared in the listings of Dalmatian nobility in Split in 1553. However, the available heraldic evidence (coats of arms) for these individuals does not definitively confirm their direct lineage to the earlier documented Luccari/de Lucaris family.

== Notable Members ==
- Frano Lukarić (1541-1598), Ragusan poet
- Jakov Lukarević (1551-1615), historian, diplomat, politician and Rector of Ragusa (1613)
- Pietro Luccari (died 1679), bishop of Ston (1664-1679)
- Ivan Lukarić (1621-1709), writer

== See also ==
- Dubrovnik
- Republic of Ragusa
- Dalmatia
