= Ruks =

Ruks (masculine), Ruka (feminine) is a Latvian surname. Notable people with the surname include:

- Alfrēds Ruks, Latvian middle-distance runner
- Inta Ruka, Latvian photographer
- Jānis Ruks, Latvian politician, M.P.
