= Ruka, Republic of Dagestan =

Ruka Рука Рукьа
- Selo
- Location within Republic of Dagestan Location within Russia
- Coordinates: 42°02′N 47°55′E
- Country: Russia
- Region: Republic of Dagestan
- District: Kaytagsky District
- Time zone: UTC+3:00

Ruka (Russian: Рука; Kaitag and Dargwa: Рукьа) is a rural locality (a selo) in Dzhavgatsky Selsoviet, Kaytagsky District, Republic of Dagestan, Russia. The population was 961 as of 2010. There are 4 streets.

== Geography ==
Ruka is located 23 km southeast of Madzhalis (the district's administrative centre) by road. Dzhavgat and Dzhibakhni are the nearest rural localities.

== Nationalities ==
Dargins live there.
