= Igor Lucić =

Serbian rower (born 1991)

Medal record

Representing Serbia

U23 World Championship
Gold medal – first place	2011 Amsterdam	Coxed fours
Gold medal – first place	2012 Trakai	Coxed fours

Junior World Championship
Gold medal – first place	2009 Brive-la-Gaillarde	Coxless pairs

Igor Lucić (Serbian: Игор Луцић, Azerbaijani: Igor Luciç, born 18 February 1991 in Belgrade) is a Serbian rower.

He won a gold medal at the 2011 World Rowing U23 Championships in Men's Coxed fours and posted U23 world record. He defended Serbia's U23 title at the 2012 World Rowing U23 Championships in Trakai, Lithuania.

He represented Azerbaijan internationally from 2013 to 2015.
