= Lucić =

Lucić (Serbo-Croatian pronunciation: [lûtsitɕ]) is a Croatian and Serbian surname which may refer to the following notable people:

- Hanibal Lucić (c.1485–1553), Croatian Renaissance poet and playwright
- Igor Lucić (born 1991), Serbian rower
- Josip Lucić (born 1957), Croatian general
- Predrag Lucić (1964–2018), Croatian journalist known for Feral Tribune
