= Watson Briggs =

Scottish international badminton player

Personal information
- Nationality: British (Scottish)
- Born: 3 July 1987

Sport
- Sport: Badminton
- Club: Renfrew
Medal record
Representing Scotland
Scottish Nationals
Gold medal – first place	2007, 09, 12	men's doubles
Gold medal – first place	2007–10, 12–13	mixed doubles

Watson Briggs (born 3 July 1987) is a former international badminton player from Scotland who competed at the Commonwealth Games.

== Biography ==
Briggs was based in Renfrew and played for Scotland at the Sudirman Cup. He represented the Scottish team at the 2010 Commonwealth Games in Delhi, India, where he competed in the badminton events.

He was three-times men's doubles champion and six-times mixed doubles champion at the Scottish National Badminton Championships.
