= Eva Sládeková =

Slovak badminton player (born 1981)

Personal information
- Born: 17 November 1981 (age 44) Trenčín, Czechoslovakia

Sport
- Country: Slovakia
- Sport: Badminton
- Coached by: Michal Matejka
- BWF profile

Eva Sládeková (born December 17, 1981, in Trenčín) is a Slovak badminton player. She is a two-time national badminton champion in the women's singles (2005 and 2007), and also, a member of the badminton team for M-Šport Trenčín Club, under her personal coach and former partner Michal Matejka.

Sladekova held her distinction of being the first Slovak badminton player to compete at the 2008 Summer Olympics in Beijing. She received a bye for the second preliminary round match of the women's singles, before losing out to Hong Kong's Wang Chen, with a score of 7–21 each in two straight periods.
