= Luka Marić (geologist) =

Croatian geologist and mineralogist (1899–1979)

Luka Marić (1899-1979) was a prominent Croatian Serb mineralogist and geologist who taught at the University of Zagreb. The sodium phosphate mineral Marinite is named after him. Luka Marić was a lifelong honorary president of SKD Prosvjeta in Zagreb and a member of the Serbian Academy of Arts and Sciences in Belgrade.
