= Luxembourg national badminton team =

National badminton team representing Luxembourg

Luxembourg
- Association: Fédération Luxembourgeoise de Badminton (FELUBA)
- Confederation: BE (Europe)
- President: Smit Robert

BWF ranking
- Current ranking: 77 ▼4 (2 January 2024)
- Highest ranking: 68 (4 October 2018)

Sudirman Cup
- Appearances: 7 (first in 1997)
- Best result: Group stage

European Mixed Team Championships
- Appearances: 1 (first in 2013)
- Best result: Group stage

European Men's Team Championships
- Appearances: 2 (first in 2018)
- Best result: Group stage

Helvetia Cup
- Appearances: 6 (first in 1993)
- Best result: 12th (2007)

The Luxembourg national badminton team (Luxembourgish: Lëtzebuerger badmintonnationalequipe; French: Équipe nationale Luxembourgeoise de badminton; German: Luxemburgische badminton-nationalmannschaft) represents Luxembourg in international badminton team competitions. The national team trains under the Luxembourg Badminton Federation, which is headquartered in Kirchberg, Luxembourg City.

The Luxembourgish team competed in the Sudirman Cup seven consecutive times from 1997 to 2009 after the national team failed to qualify for the team event. The mixed team also made its debut in the European Mixed Team Badminton Championships in 2013. The men's team competed in the 2020 European Men's Team Badminton Championships but were eliminated in the group stages.

== Competitive record ==
=== Thomas Cup ===
Year	Round	Pos
1949	Did not enter	
1952	Did not enter	
1955	Did not enter	
1958	Did not enter	
1961	Did not enter	
1964	Did not enter	
1967	Did not enter	
1970	Did not enter	
1973	Did not enter	
1976	Did not enter	
1979	Did not enter	
1982	Did not enter	
1984	Did not enter	
1986	Did not enter	
1988	Did not enter	
1990	Did not enter	
1992	Did not qualify	

Sudirman Cup

Year	Result
(Scotland) 1997	53rd - Group 7
(Denmark) 1999	46th - Group 6 Relegated
(Spain) 2001	48th - Group 7
(Netherlands) 2003	42nd - Group 6
(China) 2005	35th - Group 5
(Scotland) 2007	39th - Group 5
(China) 2009	33rd - Group 4

== Participation in European Team Badminton Championships ==
Men's Team

Year	Result
(Russia) 2018	Group stage
(France) 2020	Group stage
(Turkey) 2026	Did not qualify

Mixed Team

Year	Result
(Russia) 2013	Group stage

== Participation in Helvetia Cup ==
Year	Result
(Austria) 1993	19th place
(Cyprus) 1995	15th place
(France) 1997	16th place
(Northern Ireland) 1999	13th place
(Cyprus) 2005	16th place
(Iceland) 2007	12th place

== Players ==
=== Current squad ===
As of 2 January 2024

==== Men's team ====
Name	DoB/Age	Ranking of event		
Name	DoB/Age	MS	MD	XD
Jérôme Pauquet	5 January 2004 (age 22)	542	717	-
Yannick Feltes	10 February 2004 (age 22)	-	717	1160
Kevin Hargiono	2 April 2002 (age 24)	1210	1280	-
Léo Hölzmer	3 January 2002 (age 24)	1414	1280	-

==== Women's team ====
Name	DoB/Age	Ranking of event		
Name	DoB/Age	WS	WD	XD
Kim Schmidt	3 December 2003 (age 22)	121	805	-
Kinga Toth-Kuthy	18 March 2007 (age 19)	-	805	-
Mara Hafner	11 October 2007 (age 18)	823	747	-
Zoé Sinico	6 October 2001 (age 24)	-	747	1160
