= Luka Petrič =

Slovenian badminton player (born 1984)

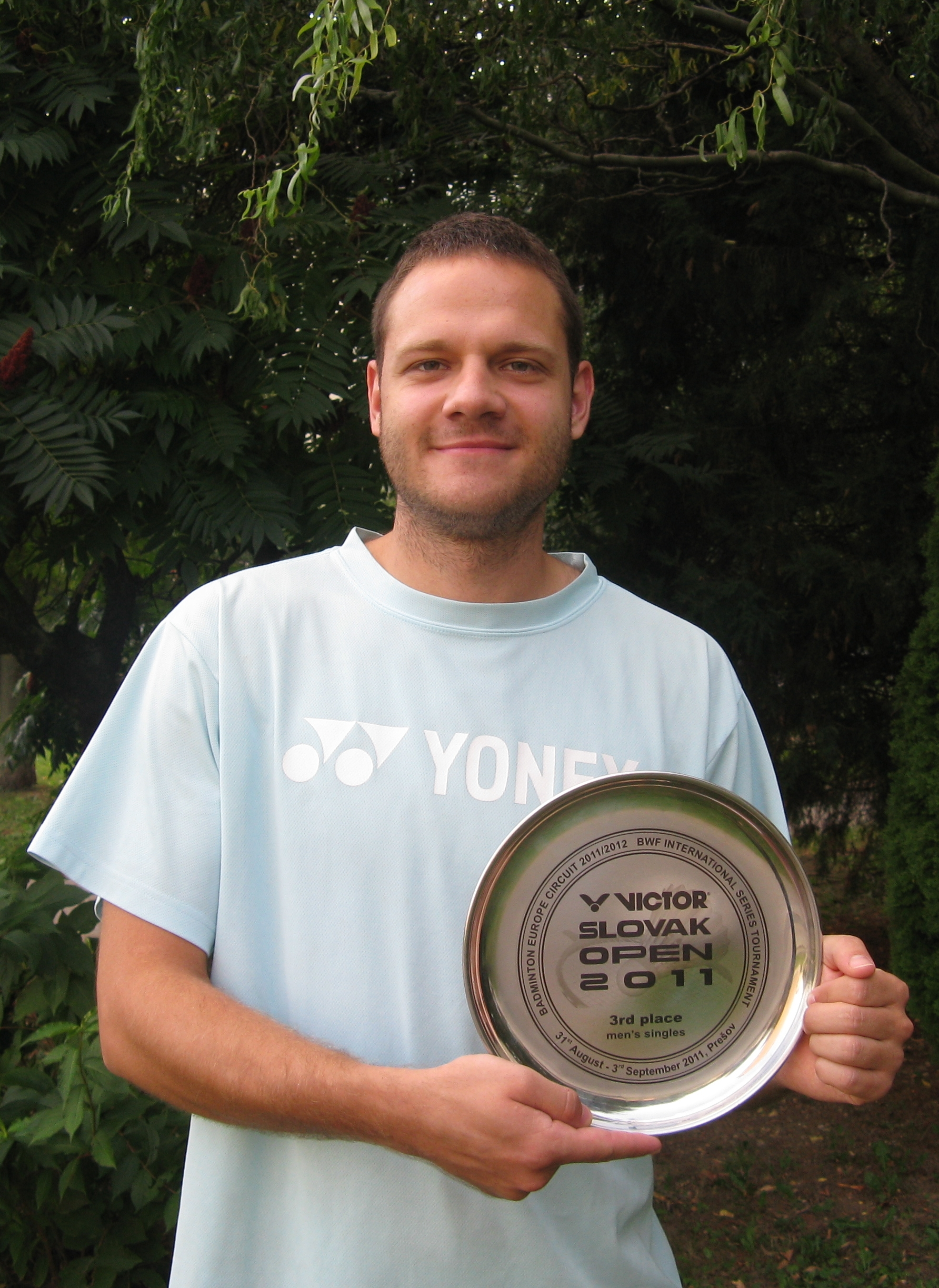
- Luka Petrič after Victor Slovak Open 2011

Personal information
- Nickname: Pepe
- Born: October 10, 1984 (age 41) Maribor, Slovenia
- Height: 1.83 m (6 ft 0 in)
- Weight: 78 kg (172 lb; 12.3 st)

Sport
- Country: Slovenia
- Sport: Badminton
- Handedness: Right
- BWF profile

Luka Petrič (born October 10, 1984) is a Slovenian badminton player.

== Career highlights ==
=== National championships ===
- 2005 – men's singles
- 2006 – men's singles & mixed doubles
- 2007 – men's singles
- 2010 – men's singles
- 2011 – men's singles, men's singles, doubles & mixed doubles
- 2012 - men's singles & mixed doubles
- 2013 - mixed doubles

=== International tournaments ===
==== 2004 ====
- 5th on Slovak Open
- 5th on Europe Cup

==== 2006 ====
- 1st on Hatzor Israel International
- 2nd on Romania International
- 17th on World Championships
- 17th on European Championships

==== 2007 ====
- 1st on Syria International
- 9th on Bitburger Open
- 17th on US Open
- Petric played the 2007 BWF World Championships in men's singles, and was defeated in the first round by Pablo Abián, of Spain, 21–9, 29–27.

==== 2009 ====
- 3rd on Croatian International
- 3rd on Slovenia International

==== 2011 ====
- 3rd on Victor Slovak Open 2011
