= Austrian National Badminton Championships =

The Austrian National Badminton Championships is a tournament organized to crown the best badminton players in Austria. They have been held since 1958.

== Past winners ==
Year	Men's singles	Women's singles	Men's doubles	Women's doubles	Mixed doubles
1958	Helmut Kraule	Lotte Heri	Valentin Taupe; August Woschitz	Hilde Taupe; Anni Taupe	Bernd Frohnwieser; Hilde Themel
1959	Bernd Frohnwieser	Hilde Taupe	Hans Fauland; Heinz Gertz	Lotte Heri; Anni Ninaus	Bernd Frohnwieser; Hilde Themel
1960	Bernd Frohnwieser	Lotte Heri	Bernd Frohnwieser; Heinz Ottmann	Hilde Taupe; Anni Taupe	Bernd Frohnwieser; Hilde Themel
1961	Fritz Plockinger	Hilde Taupe	Bernd Frohnwieser; Heinz Ottmann	Hilde Taupe; Anni Taupe	Hermann Fröhlich; Lore Voit
1962	Heinz Ottmann	Britta Kajdasz	Franz Fuchs; Kurt Achtleitner	Britta Kajdasz; Christa Schlogl	Hermann Fröhlich; Lore Voit
1963	Reinhold Pum	Britta Kajdasz	Reinhold Pum; Karl Buchart	Lore Voit; Brigitte Hlinka	Reinhold Pum; Brigitte Hlinka
1964	Reinhold Pum	Hilde Kreulitsch	Reinhold Pum; Karl Buchart	Lore Voit; Brigitte Hlinka	Hermann Fröhlich; Lore Voit
1965	Reinhold Pum	Hilde Kreulitsch	Reinhold Pum; Karl Buchart	Elisabeth Wieltschnig; Ingrid Wieltschnig	Hermann Fröhlich; Lore Voit
1966	Reinhold Pum	Elisabeth Wieltschnig	Franz Fuchs; Erwin Kirchhofer	Elisabeth Wieltschnig; Ingrid Wieltschnig	Reinhold Pum; Ingrid Wieltschnig
1967	Hermann Fröhlich	Ingrid Wieltschnig	Bernd Frohnwieser; Reinhold Pum	Elisabeth Wieltschnig; Ingrid Wieltschnig	Reinhold Pum; Ingrid Wieltschnig
1968	Reinhold Pum	Ingrid Wieltschnig	Reinhold Pum; Leopold Bauer	Elisabeth Wieltschnig; Ingrid Wieltschnig	Reinhold Pum; Ingrid Wieltschnig
1969	Hermann Fröhlich	Ingrid Wieltschnig	Reinhold Pum; Leopold Bauer	Elisabeth Wieltschnig; Ingrid Wieltschnig	Hermann Fröhlich; Lore König
1970	Hermann Fröhlich	Hilde Kreulitsch	Erwin Kirchhofer; Karl Klesadl	Elisabeth Wieltschnig; Ingrid Wieltschnig	Hermann Fröhlich; Lore König
1971	Hermann Fröhlich	Ingrid Wieltschnig	Alfred Hofer; Dieter Hofer	Elisabeth Wieltschnig; Ingrid Wieltschnig	Reinhold Pum; Friederike Pum
1972	Alfred Hofer	Ingrid Wieltschnig	Leopold Bauer; Alfred Kohlhauser	Elisabeth Wieltschnig; Ingrid Wieltschnig	Siegfried Jost; Ingrid Wieltschnig
1973	Hermann Fröhlich	Elisabeth Wieltschnig	Alfred Hofer; Dieter Hofer	Elisabeth Wieltschnig; Ingrid Potocnik	Hermann Fröhlich; Lore König
1974	Hermann Fröhlich	Brigitte Reichman	Alfred Hofer; Dieter Hofer	Elisabeth Wieltschnig; Ingrid Potocnik	Hermann Fröhlich; Lore König
1975	Reinhold Pum	Brigitte Reichman	Johann Ratheyser; Gerald Hofegger	Elisabeth Schechtner; Brigitte Reichmann	Hermann Fröhlich; Lore König
1976	Reinhold Pum	Ingrid Potocnik	Johann Ratheyser; Gerald Hofegger	Elisabeth Wieltschnig; Ingrid Potocnik	Gerald Hofegger; Ingrid Potocnik
1977	Hermann Fröhlich	Renate Dietrich	Johann Ratheyser; Gerald Hofegger	Hilde Kreulitsch; Renate Dietrich	Ernst Stingl; Hilde Kreulitsch
1978	Johann Ratheyser	Elisabeth Wieltschnig	Johann Ratheyser; Gerald Hofegger	Elisabeth Wieltschnig; Brigitte Reichmann	Gerald Hofegger; Hilde Kreulitsch
1979	Johann Ratheyser	Renate Dietrich	Johann Ratheyser; Gerald Hofegger	Herta Obritzhauser; Brigitte Reichmann	Johann Ratheyser; Brigitte Reichmann
1980	Gerald Hofegger	Herta Obritzhauser	Johann Ratheyser; Gerald Hofegger	Herta Obritzhauser; Brigitte Reichmann	Johann Ratheyser; Brigitte Reichmann
1981	Peter Moritz	Herta Obritzhauser	Johann Ratheyser; Gerald Hofegger	Herta Obritzhauser; Brigitte Reichmann	Alexander Almer; Herta Obritzhauser
1982	Klaus Fischer	Herta Obritzhauser	Klaus Fischer; Heinz Fischer	Elisabeth Wieltschnig; Ingrid Potocnik	Alexander Almer; Herta Obritzhauser
1983	Klaus Fischer	Herta Obritzhauser	Johann Ratheyser; Gerald Hofegger	Elisabeth Wieltschnig; Ingrid Potocnik	Alexander Almer; Herta Obritzhauser
1984	Klaus Fischer	Herta Obritzhauser	Johann Ratheyser; Gerald Hofegger	Herta Obritzhauser; Brigitte Wastl	Alexander Almer; Herta Obritzhauser
1985	Klaus Fischer	Herta Obritzhauser	Klaus Fischer; Heinz Fischer	Elisabeth Wieltschnig; Hilde Kreulitsch	Alexander Almer; Herta Obritzhauser
1986	Heinz Fischer	Herta Obritzhauser	Klaus Fischer; Heinz Fischer	Herta Obritzhauser; Brigitte Wastl	Alexander Almer; Herta Obritzhauser
1987	Tariq Farooq	Sabine Ploner	Klaus Fischer; Heinz Fischer	Sabine Ploner; Gabriele Kumpfmüller	Heinz Fischer; Elisabeth Wieltschnig
1988	Klaus Fischer	Sabine Ploner	Klaus Fischer; Heinz Fischer	Sabine Ploner; Gabriele Kumpfmüller	Klaus Fischer; Sabine Ploner
1989	Klaus Fischer	Sabine Ploner	Klaus Fischer; Heinz Fischer	Sabine Ploner; Brigitte Wastl	Klaus Fischer; Sabine Ploner
1990	Jürgen Koch	Sabine Ploner	Jürgen Koch; Hannes Fuchs	Sabine Ploner; Sigrun Ploner	Klaus Fischer; Sabine Ploner
1991	Jürgen Koch	Sabine Ploner	Jürgen Koch; Harald Koch	Sabine Ploner; Sigrun Ploner	Heinz Fischer; Sabine Ploner
1992	Hannes Fuchs	Sabine Ploner	Hannes Fuchs; Heimo Götschl	Sabine Ploner; Sigrun Ploner	Heinz Fischer; Sabine Ploner
1993	Hannes Fuchs	Sigrun Ploner	Jürgen Koch; Harald Koch	Sabine Ploner; Sigrun Ploner	Heinz Fischer; Sabine Ploner
1994	Hannes Fuchs	Irina Serova	Jürgen Koch; Harald Koch	Sabine Ploner; Sigrun Ploner	Vladimir Serov; Irina Serova
1995	Jürgen Koch	Verena Fastenbauer	Heimo Götschl; Kai Abraham	Sabine Ploner; Sigrun Ploner	Kai Abraham; Sigrun Ploner
1996	Peter Kreulitsch	Verena Fastenbauer	Heimo Götschl; Harald Koch	Sabine Ploner; Verena Fastenbauer	Heinz Fischer; Sabine Ploner
1997	Jürgen Koch	Verena Fastenbauer	Jürgen Koch; Harald Koch	Bettina Weilguni; Irina Serova	Jürgen Koch; Irina Serova
1998	Jürgen Koch	Irina Serova	Heimo Götschl; Kai Abraham	Bettina Weilguni; Irina Serova	Harald Koch; Bettina Weilguni
1999	Jürgen Koch	Irina Serova	Jürgen Koch; Harald Koch	Bettina Weilguni; Irina Serova	Harald Koch; Bettina Weilguni
2000	Jürgen Koch	Simone Prutsch	Jürgen Koch; Harald Koch	Bettina Weilguni; Irina Serova	Harald Koch; Bettina Weilguni
2001	Jürgen Koch	Simone Prutsch	Jürgen Koch; Harald Koch	Bettina Weilguni; Irina Serova	Harald Koch; Bettina Weilguni
2002	Jürgen Koch	Verena Fastenbauer	Jürgen Koch; Harald Koch	Simone Prutsch; Sabine Franz	Harald Koch; Bettina Weilguni
2003	Jürgen Koch	Simone Prutsch	Heimo Götschl; Martin De Jonge	Simone Prutsch; Sabine Franz	Michael Lahnsteiner; Verena Fastenbauer
2004	Jürgen Koch	Simone Prutsch	Heimo Götschl; Martin De Jonge	Simone Prutsch; Sabine Franz	Harald Koch; Verena Fastenbauer
2005	Jürgen Koch	Simone Prutsch	Harald Koch; Peter Zauner	Simone Prutsch; Sabine Franz	Michael Lahnsteiner; Tina Riedel
2006	Peter Zauner	Simone Prutsch	Harald Koch; Peter Zauner	Simone Prutsch; Sabine Franz	Michael Lahnsteiner; Tina Riedl
2007	Jürgen Koch	Simone Prutsch	Heimo Götschl; Manuel Berger	Miriam Gruber; Tina Riedl	Michael Lahnsteiner; Tina Riedl
2008	Jürgen Koch	Miriam Gruber	Harald Koch; Peter Zauner	Iris Freimüller; Karina Lengauer	Roman Zirnwald; Tina Riedl
2009	Peter Zauner	Miriam Gruber	Jürgen Koch; Peter Zauner	Belinda Heber; Elisabeth Baldauf	Jürgen Koch; Zhu Niannian
2010	Michael Lahnsteiner	Claudia Mayer	Jürgen Koch; Peter Zauner	Iris Freimüller; Tina Riedl	Jürgen Koch; Zhu Niannian
2011	Michael Lahnsteiner	Claudia Mayer	Jürgen Koch; Peter Zauner	Belinda Heber; Alexandra Mathis	Roman Zirnwald; Simone Prutsch
2012	Luka Wraber	Simone Prutsch	Jürgen Koch; Peter Zauner	Elisabeth Baldauf; Alexandra Mathis	Roman Zirnwald; Elisabeth Baldauf
2013	David Obernosterer	Simone Prutsch	Roman Zirnwald; Daniel Grassmück	Elisabeth Baldauf; Alexandra Mathis	Roman Zirnwald; Elisabeth Baldauf
2014	David Obernosterer	Alexandra Mathis	Jürgen Koch; Peter Zauner	Elisabeth Baldauf; Belinda Heber	Roman Zirnwald; Elisabeth Baldauf
2015	Matthias Almer	Elisabeth Baldauf	Jürgen Koch; Peter Zauner	Elisabeth Baldauf; Iris Freimüller	Roman Zirnwald; Elisabeth Baldauf
2016	Luka Wraber	Katrin Neudolt	Jürgen Koch; Peter Zauner	Jenny Ertl; Anna Demmelmayer	Roman Zirnwald; Sonja Langthaler
2017	Luka Wraber	Jenny Ertl	Jürgen Koch; Peter Zauner	Serena Au Yeong; Sabrina Herbst	Roman Zirnwald; Sonja Langthaler
2018	Luka Wraber	Jenny Ertl	Roman Zirnwald; Daniel Grassmück	Serena Au Yeong; Sabrina Herbst	Roman Zirnwald; Elisabeth Baldauf
2019	Leon Seiwald	Bianca Schiester	Philip Birker; Dominik Stipsits	Réka Sárosí; Bianca Schiester	Dominik Stipsits; Serena Au Yeong
2020	Wolfgang Gnedt	Katrin Neudolt	Philip Birker; Dominik Stipsits	Katharina Hochmeir; Serena Au Yeong	Philip Birker; Katharina Hochmeir
2021	Wolfgang Gnedt	Katrin Neudolt	Philip Birker; Dominik Stipsits	Serena Au Yeong; Katharina Hochmeir	Philip Birker; Katharina Hochmeir
2022	Luka Wraber	Katrin Neudolt	Philip Birker; Philipp Drexler	Réka Sárosi; Bianca Schiester	Philip Birker; Katharina Hochmeir
2023	Luka Wraber	Katrin Neudolt	Philip Birker; Philipp Drexler	Serena Au Yeong; Katharina Hochmeir	Philip Birker; Serena Au Yeong
2024	Kai Niederhuber	Carina Meinke	Philip Birker; Philipp Drexler	Serena Au Yeong; Katharina Hochmeir	Kai Niederhuber; Anna Hagspiel
2025	Wolfgang Gnedt	Katrin Neudolt	Wolfgang Gnedt; Kai Niederhuber	Serena Au Yeong; Anna Hagspiel	Kai Niederhuber; Anna Hagspiel
