= 2017 Sudirman Cup knockout stage =

Badminton championships

The knockout stage of the 2017 badminton Sudirman Cup was the final phase of the competition, following the group stage. It began on May 25 with the quarterfinals and concluded on May 28 with the final match of the tournament, which was held at the Carrara Sports and Leisure Centre in Gold Coast, Australia.

The top two teams from each group (eight in total) advanced to the knockout stage, competing in a single-elimination tournament. Meanwhile, the teams from Groups 2 and 3 (fourteen in total) advanced to the classification stage, where they also competed in a single-elimination tournament.

== Qualified teams ==
=== Group 1 ===
Group	Winners	Runners-up
A	China	Thailand
B	Chinese Taipei	South Korea
C	Japan	Malaysia
D	Denmark	India

=== Group 2 ===
Group	Winners	Runners-up	Third place	Fourth place
A	Vietnam	Canada	Scotland	New Zealand
B	Singapore	Australia	United States	Austria

=== Group 3 ===
Group	Winners	Runners-up	Third place	Fourth place
A	Macau	New Caledonia	Guam	
B	Sri Lanka	Slovakia	Fiji	Tahiti

== Bracket ==
=== Group 1 ===
Quarter-finals
26 May – Gold Coast
China	3
India	0
26 May – Gold Coast
Japan	3
Malaysia	1
25 May – Gold Coast
South Korea	3
Chinese Taipei	1
25 May – Gold Coast
Thailand	3
Denmark	2

Semi-finals
27 May – Gold Coast
China	3
Japan	2
27 May – Gold Coast
South Korea	3
Thailand	1

Final
28 May – Gold Coast
China	2
South Korea	3

=== Group 2 ===
Thirteenth place match
Vietnam	3
Singapore	1

Fifteenth place match
Canada	2
Australia	3

Seventeenth place match
Scotland	3
United States	0

Nineteenth place match
New Zealand	3
Austria	1

=== Group 3 ===
Twenty-first place match
Macau	0
Sri Lanka	3

Twenty-third place match
New Caledonia	0
Slovakia	3

Twenty-fifth place match
Guam	1
Fiji	3

== Classification round ==
=== Twenty-fifth place match: Guam vs Fiji ===
Guam
1
Carrara Sports and Leisure Centre, Court 3
25 May 2017

Fiji
3

			1	2	3
1	(Guam) (Fiji)	Sarah Cai / David Yao; Ahmad Ali / Karyn Gibson	16; 21	8; 21
2	(Guam) (Fiji)	Sunardi Li; Liam Fong	10; 21	8; 21
3	(Guam) (Fiji)	Grace Cai; Danielle Whiteside	21; 13	24; 22
4	(Guam) (Fiji)	Sunardi Li / David Yao; Ahmad Ali / Soon Seng Low	10; 21	12; 21
5	(Guam) (Fiji)	Grace Cai / Sarah Cai; Karyn Gibson / Danielle Whiteside				not played

=== Twenty-third place match: New Caledonia vs Slovakia ===
New Caledonia
1
Carrara Sports and Leisure Centre, Court 4
25 May 2017

Slovakia
3

			1	2	3
1	(New Caledonia) (Slovakia)	Yohan De Geoffroy / Johanna Kou; Matej Hlinican / Katarina Vargova	16; 21	8; 21
2	(New Caledonia) (Slovakia)	Ronan Ho-Yagues; Milan Dratva	10; 21	8; 21
3	(New Caledonia) (Slovakia)	Cecilia Moussy; Martina Repiská	21; 13	24; 22
4	(New Caledonia) (Slovakia)	Jeremy Lemaitre / Morgan Paitio; Milan Dratva / Matej Hlinican	10; 21	12; 21
5	(New Caledonia) (Slovakia)	Dgenyva Matauli / Tiphaine Tamole; Martina Repiská / Katarina Vargova				not played

=== Twenty-first place match: Macau vs Sri Lanka ===
Macau
0
Carrara Sports and Leisure Centre, Court 2
25 May 2017

Sri Lanka
3

			1	2	3
1	(Macau) (Sri Lanka)	Gong Xue Xin / Iek U Ieong; Buwenaka Goonathileka / Kavindi Ishandika Sirimannage	10; 21	4; 21
2	(Macau) (Sri Lanka)	Pui Pang Fong; Niluka Karunaratne	17; 21	6; 21
3	(Macau) (Sri Lanka)	Ng Weng Chi; Thilini Pramodika Hendahewa	9; 21	7; 22
4	(Macau) (Sri Lanka)	Che Pui Ngai / Lam Hou Him; Dinuka Karunaratne / Niluka Karunaratne				not played
5	(Macau) (Sri Lanka)	Ng Weng Chi / Wong Kit Ieng; Thilini Pramodika Hendahewa / Kavindi Ishandika Sirimannage				not played

=== Nineteenth place match: New Zealand vs Austria ===
New Zealand
3
Carrara Sports and Leisure Centre, Court 4
26 May 2017

Austria
1

			1	2	3
1	(New Zealand) (Austria)	Oliver Leydon-Davis / Susannah Leydon-Davis; Serena Au Yeong / Roman Zirnwald	21; 13	21; 16
2	(New Zealand) (Austria)	Oscar Guo; Luka Wraber	21; 13	10; 21	12; 21
3	(New Zealand) (Austria)	Kevin Dennerly-Minturn / Oliver Leydon-Davis; Dominik Stipsits / Roman Zirnwald	18; 21	21; 19	21; 17
4	(New Zealand) (Austria)	Sally Fu; Katharina Hochmeir	22; 20	21; 11
5	(New Zealand) (Austria)	Anona Pak / Danielle Tahuri; Serena Au Yeong / Antonia Meinke				not played

=== Seventeenth place match: Scotland vs United States ===
Scotland
3
Carrara Sports and Leisure Centre, Court 3
26 May 2017

United States
0

			1	2	3
1	(Scotland) (United States)	Martin Campbell / Patrick MacHugh; Vinson Chiu / Timothy Lam	21; 12	21; 15
2	(Scotland) (United States)	Kirsty Gilmour; Jamie Subandhi	21; 9	21; 7
3	(Scotland) (United States)	Kieran Merrilees; Nicholas Robert Henson Waller	21; 7	21; 6
4	(Scotland) (United States)	Rebekka Findlay / Julie MacPherson; Crystal Pan / Annie Xu				not played
5	(Scotland) (United States)	Adam Hall / Eleanor O'Donnell; Jennie Gai / Darren Yang				not played

=== Fifteenth place match: Canada vs Australia ===
Canada
2
Carrara Sports and Leisure Centre, Court 2
26 May 2017

Australia
3

			1	2	3
1	(Canada) (Australia)	Josephine Wu / Nyl Yakura; Setyana Mapasa / Sawan Serasinghe	13; 21	16; 21
2	(Canada) (Australia)	Jason Ho-shue; Anthony Joe	21; 17	21; 5
3	(Canada) (Australia)	Michelle Li; Wendy Chen Hsuan-yu	21; 19	21; 17
4	(Canada) (Australia)	Jason Ho-shue / Nyl Yakura; Matthew Chau / Sawan Serasinghe	22; 20	19; 21	18; 21
5	(Canada) (Australia)	Rachel Honderich / Michelle Li; Setyana Mapasa / Gronya Somerville	12; 21	21; 13	17; 21

=== Thirteenth place match: Vietnam vs Singapore ===
Vietnam
3
Carrara Sports and Leisure Centre, Court 1
26 May 2017

Singapore
1

			1	2	3
1	(Vietnam) (Singapore)	Đỗ Tuấn Đức / Phạm Như Thảo; Danny Bawa Chrisnanta / Crystal Wong Jia Ying	21; 18	23; 21
2	(Vietnam) (Singapore)	Nguyễn Tiến Minh; Ryan Ng Zin Rei	25; 23	21; 9
3	(Vietnam) (Singapore)	Đỗ Tuấn Đức / Phạm Hồng Nam; Danny Bawa Chrisnanta / Terry Hee Yong Kai	12; 21	16; 21
4	(Vietnam) (Singapore)	Vũ Thị Trang; Grace Chua Hui Zhen	21; 11	21; 11
5	(Vietnam) (Singapore)	Nguyễn Thùy Linh / Phạm Như Thảo; Ong Ren Ne / Crystal Wong Jia Ying				not played

== Quarter-finals ==
=== China vs India ===
China
3
Carrara Sports and Leisure Centre, Court 2
26 May 2017

India
0

			1	2	3
1	(China) (India)	Lu Kai / Huang Yaqiong; Satwiksairaj Rankireddy / Ashwini Ponnappa	16; 21	21; 13	21; 16
2	(China) (India)	Chen Long; Srikanth Kidambi	21; 16	21; 17
3	(China) (India)	Fu Haifeng / Zhang Nan; Satwiksairaj Rankireddy / Chirag Shetty	21; 9	21; 11
4	(China) (India)	He Bingjiao; P. V. Sindhu				not played
5	(China) (India)	Bao Yixin / Tang Jinhua; Ashwini Ponnappa / N. Sikki Reddy				not played

=== Japan vs Malaysia ===
Japan
3
Carrara Sports and Leisure Centre, Court 1
26 May 2017

Malaysia
1

			1	2	3
1	(Japan) (Malaysia)	Takeshi Kamura / Keigo Sonoda; Goh V Shem / Tan Wee Kiong	21; 17	16; 21	21; 11
2	(Japan) (Malaysia)	Nozomi Okuhara; Sonia Cheah Su Ya	21; 11	21; 9
3	(Japan) (Malaysia)	Kenta Nishimoto; Lee Chong Wei	15; 21	13; 21
4	(Japan) (Malaysia)	Misaki Matsutomo / Ayaka Takahashi; Vivian Hoo Kah Mun / Woon Khe Wei	21; 7	21; 14
5	(Japan) (Malaysia)	Yuta Watanabe / Arisa Higashino; Tan Kian Meng / Lai Pei Jing				not played

=== Korea vs Chinese Taipei ===
South Korea
3
Carrara Sports and Leisure Centre, Court 1
25 May 2017

Chinese Taipei
1

			1	2	3
1	(South Korea) (Chinese Taipei)	Choi Sol-gyu / Seo Seung-jae; Lee Jhe-huei / Lee Yang	21; 16	14; 21	21; 17
2	(South Korea) (Chinese Taipei)	Sung Ji-hyun; Tai Tzu-ying	14; 21	24; 26
3	(South Korea) (Chinese Taipei)	Son Wan-ho; Chou Tien-chen	13; 21	21; 18	23; 21
4	(South Korea) (Chinese Taipei)	Chang Ye-na / Lee So-hee; Hsu Ya-ching / Wu Ti-jung	21; 13	21; 18
5	(South Korea) (Chinese Taipei)	Choi Sol-gyu / Chae Yoo-jung; Wang Chi-lin / Lee Chia-hsin				not played

=== Thailand vs Denmark ===
Thailand
3
Carrara Sports and Leisure Centre, Court 2
25 May 2017

Denmark
2

			1	2	3
1	(Thailand) (Denmark)	Dechapol Puavaranukroh / Sapsiree Taerattanachai; Mathias Christiansen / Sara Thygesen	21; 19	21; 19
2	(Thailand) (Denmark)	Tanongsak Saensomboonsuk; Viktor Axelsen	15; 21	6; 21
3	(Thailand) (Denmark)	Bodin Issara / Nipitphon Puangpuapech; Mads Conrad-Petersen / Mads Pieler Kolding	21; 15	18; 21	16; 21
4	(Thailand) (Denmark)	Ratchanok Intanon; Line Kjærsfeldt	21; 15	21; 14
5	(Thailand) (Denmark)	Jongkolphan Kititharakul / Sapsiree Taerattanachai; Kamilla Rytter Juhl / Christinna Pedersen	21; 15	21; 12

== Semi-finals ==
=== China vs Japan ===
China
3
Carrara Sports and Leisure Centre, Court 1
27 May 2017

Japan
2

			1	2	3
1	(China) (Japan)	Zheng Siwei / Chen Qingchen; Yuta Watanabe / Arisa Higashino	12; 21	21; 14	19; 21
2	(China) (Japan)	Lin Dan; Kenta Nishimoto	21; 19	21; 16
3	(China) (Japan)	Li Junhui / Liu Yuchen; Takeshi Kamura / Keigo Sonoda	23; 21	21; 16
4	(China) (Japan)	Sun Yu; Akane Yamaguchi	17; 21	15; 21
5	(China) (Japan)	Chen Qingchen / Jia Yifan; Misaki Matsutomo / Ayaka Takahashi	21; 12	21; 19

=== Korea vs Thailand ===
South Korea
3
Carrara Sports and Leisure Centre, Court 1
27 May 2017

Thailand
1

			1	2	3
1	(South Korea) (Thailand)	Choi Sol-gyu / Chae Yoo-jung; Dechapol Puavaranukroh / Sapsiree Taerattanachai	16; 21	12; 21
2	(South Korea) (Thailand)	Son Wan-ho; Suppanyu Avihingsanon	18; 21	21; 10	21; 17
3	(South Korea) (Thailand)	Choi Sol-gyu / Seo Seung-jae; Bodin Issara / Dechapol Puavaranukroh	21; 13	21; 16
4	(South Korea) (Thailand)	Sung Ji-hyun; Ratchanok Intanon	21; 13	21; 17
5	(South Korea) (Thailand)	Chang Ye-na / Lee So-hee; Jongkolphan Kititharakul / Sapsiree Taerattanachai				not played

== Final: Korea def. China ==
China
2
Carrara Sports and Leisure Centre, Court 1
28 May 2017

South Korea
3

			1	2	3
1	(China) (South Korea)	Fu Haifeng / Zhang Nan; Choi Sol-gyu / Seo Seung-jae	21; 14	21; 15
2	(China) (South Korea)	He Bingjiao; Sung Ji-hyun	12; 21	16; 21
3	(China) (South Korea)	Chen Long; Jeon Hyeok-jin	21; 10	21; 10
4	(China) (South Korea)	Chen Qingchen / Jia Yifan; Chang Ye-na / Lee So-hee	19; 21	13; 21
5	(China) (South Korea)	Lu Kai / Huang Yaqiong; Choi Sol-gyu / Chae Yoo-jung	17; 21	13; 21
