= 2017 Sudirman Cup =

Badminton championships

Tournament details
- Dates: 21–28 May
- Edition: 15th
- Level: International
- Venue: Carrara Sports and Leisure Centre
- Location: Gold Coast, Queensland, Australia

The 2017 Sudirman Cup (officially known as the 2017 Total BWF Sudirman Cup for sponsorship reasons) was the 15th edition of the Sudirman Cup, the biennial international badminton championship contested by the mixed national teams of the member associations of Badminton World Federation (BWF), since its inception in 1989. The tournament was hosted by Gold Coast, Australia, between 21 and 28 May 2017. It was the first time this event was hosted outside Asia and Europe since its establishment in 1989.

The matches was played at Carrara Sports and Leisure Centre. It was the first time that Australia had hosted the tournament and the first time this event is hosted outside Asia and Europe since its establishment in 1989.

China was the defending champion. Korea defeated China 3–2 to win the tournament, which became the first Sudirman Cup title for Korea after 2003.

== Host city selection ==
Glasgow and Gold Coast submitted bids to host 2017 Sudirman Cup. Gold Coast was announced as the host for 2017 Sudirman Cup, while Glasgow later awarded the 2017 BWF World Championships.

== Seedings ==
The seedings for 32 teams competing in the tournament were released on 2 March 2017. It was based on aggregated points from the best players in the world ranking. The tournament was divided into four groups, with twelve teams in the elite group competing for the title. Eight teams were seeded into second and third groups and four remaining teams were seeded into fourth group.

On the day of the draw, it was announced that the original list of 32 teams was pared down to 28, with four teams – Mexico, Netherlands, Spain and Sweden were withdrawing from the tournament. The 28 participating teams were divided into four groups, with Group 1 consisting of the 12 teams that will compete for the title. Group 2 and Group 3 (eight teams each) will fight for overall placings. The draw was held on 17 March 2017. England withdrew from the Sudirman Cup on 4 April 2017.

Rank	Team	Points	Group	Notes
1	China	359843	1	
2	Denmark	334544	1	
3	South Korea	315087	1	
4	Japan	313853	1	
5	Malaysia	296873	1	
6	Indonesia	289727	1	
7	Thailand	266335	1	
8	Chinese Taipei	249965	1	
9	India	226509	1	
10	England	207930	1	Withdraw
11	Hong Kong	195775	1	
12	Russia	166701	1	

Rank	Team	Points	Group	Notes
13	Germany	156839	2	▲ Grp.1
14	Singapore	140819	2	
15	Netherlands	127822	2	Withdraw
16	Australia	126915	2	
17	Vietnam	121569	2	
18	Sweden	119234	2	Withdraw
19	Spain	117931	2	Withdraw
20	United States	107606	2	
21	Scotland	95524	3	▲ Grp.2
22	Canada	83511	3	▲ Grp.2
23	Austria	72731	3	▲ Grp.2
24	Mexico	36107	3	Withdraw

Rank	Team	Points	Group	Notes
25	New Zealand	156839	3	▲ Grp.2
26	Sri Lanka	32434	3	
27	Slovakia	17929	3	
28	New Caledonia	15400	3	
29	Macau	7410	4	▲ Grp.3
30	Tahiti	6160	4	▲ Grp.3
31	Fiji	Nil	4	▲ Grp.3
32	Guam	Nil	4	▲ Grp.3

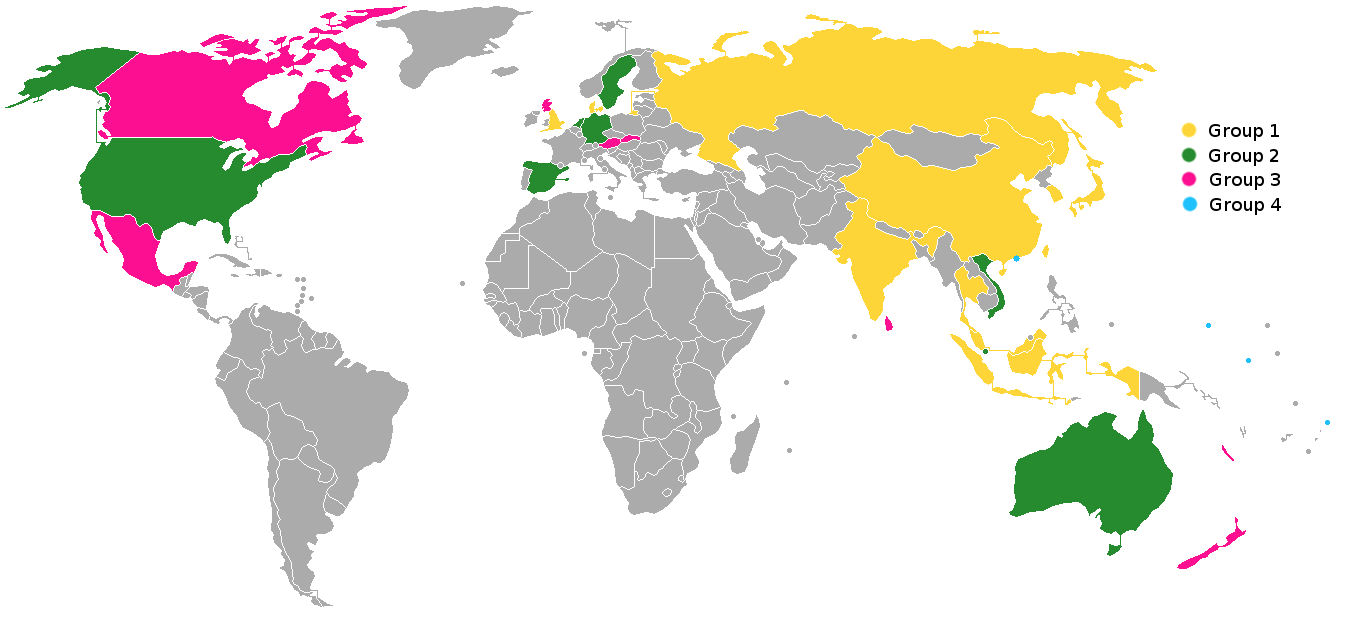
Nations participating in the 2017 Sudirman Cup.

=== Group composition ===
Group 1				Group 2		Group 3	
Group 1A	Group 1B	Group 1C	Group 1D	Group 2A	Group 2B	Group 3A	Group 3B
China; Thailand; Hong Kong	South Korea; Chinese Taipei; Russia	Japan; Malaysia; Germany	Denmark; Indonesia; India	Vietnam; Scotland; Canada; New Zealand	Singapore; Australia; United States; Austria	New Caledonia; Macau; Guam	Sri Lanka; Slovakia; Fiji; Tahiti

== Group stage ==
=== Group 1A ===
Pos	Team	Pld	W	L	MW	ML	GW	GL	PW	PL	Pts	Qualification
1	China	2	2	0	9	1	19	2	440	331	2	Quarter-finals
2	Thailand	2	1	1	3	7	7	15	365	429	1	Quarter-finals
3	Hong Kong	2	0	2	3	7	7	16	384	449	0	

Team 1	Score	Team 2
China	4–1	Hong Kong
Thailand	3–2	Hong Kong
China	5–0	Thailand

=== Group 1B ===
Pos	Team	Pld	W	L	MW	ML	GW	GL	PW	PL	Pts	Qualification
1	Chinese Taipei	2	2	0	7	3	15	9	464	415	2	Quarter-finals
2	South Korea	2	1	1	6	4	14	8	425	352	1	Quarter-finals
3	Russia	2	0	2	2	8	5	17	328	450	0	

Team 1	Score	Team 2
South Korea	4–1	Russia
Chinese Taipei	4–1	Russia
South Korea	2–3	Chinese Taipei

=== Group 1C ===
Pos	Team	Pld	W	L	MW	ML	GW	GL	PW	PL	Pts	Qualification
1	Japan	2	2	0	7	3	15	8	420	371	2	Quarter-finals
2	Malaysia	2	1	1	7	3	15	7	422	347	1	Quarter-finals
3	Germany	2	0	2	1	9	3	18	293	417	0	

Team 1	Score	Team 2
Japan	4–1	Germany
Malaysia	5–0	Germany
Japan	3–2	Malaysia

=== Group 1D ===
Pos	Team	Pld	W	L	MW	ML	GW	GL	PW	PL	Pts	Qualification
1	Denmark	2	1	1	6	4	14	12	476	480	1	Quarter-finals
2	India	2	1	1	5	5	12	11	415	419	1	Quarter-finals
3	Indonesia	2	1	1	4	6	11	14	468	460	1	

Team 1	Score	Team 2
Denmark	4–1	India
Indonesia	1–4	India
Denmark	2–3	Indonesia

=== Group 2A ===
Pos	Team	Pld	W	L	MW	ML	GW	GL	PW	PL	Pts	Qualification
1	Vietnam	3	3	0	13	2	28	6	685	500	3	Classification round
2	Canada	3	2	1	8	7	17	19	648	640	2	Classification round
3	Scotland	3	1	2	7	8	18	19	663	650	1	Classification round
4	New Zealand	3	0	3	2	13	9	28	525	731	0	Classification round

Team 1	Score	Team 2
Vietnam	4–1	New Zealand
Scotland	2–3	Canada
Vietnam	5–0	Canada
Scotland	4–1	New Zealand
Canada	5–0	New Zealand
Vietnam	4–1	Scotland

=== Group 2B ===
Pos	Team	Pld	W	L	MW	ML	GW	GL	PW	PL	Pts	Qualification
1	Singapore	3	3	0	14	1	28	5	674	494	3	Classification round
2	Australia	3	2	1	10	5	20	10	567	466	2	Classification round
3	United States	3	1	2	4	11	10	22	527	581	1	Classification round
4	Austria	3	0	3	2	13	6	27	439	666	0	Classification round

Team 1	Score	Team 2
Australia	4–1	United States
Singapore	5–0	Austria
Australia	5–0	Austria
Singapore	5–0	United States
United States	3–2	Austria
Singapore	4–1	Australia

=== Group 3A ===
Pos	Team	Pld	W	L	MW	ML	GW	GL	PW	PL	Pts	Qualification
1	Macau	2	2	0	10	0	20	2	461	251	2	Classification round
2	New Caledonia	2	1	1	4	6	9	12	346	370	1	Classification round
3	Guam	2	0	2	1	9	3	18	251	437	0	Classification round

Team 1	Score	Team 2
New Caledonia	4–1	Guam
Macau	5–0	Guam
New Caledonia	0–5	Macau

=== Group 3B ===
Pos	Team	Pld	W	L	MW	ML	GW	GL	PW	PL	Pts	Qualification
1	Sri Lanka	3	3	0	15	0	30	0	630	249	3	Classification round
2	Slovakia	3	2	1	10	5	20	10	543	382	2	Classification round
3	Fiji	3	1	2	4	11	9	24	416	652	1	Classification round
4	Tahiti	3	0	3	1	14	4	29	376	682	0	

Team 1	Score	Team 2
Sri Lanka	5–0	Fiji
Slovakia	5–0	Tahiti
Sri Lanka	5–0	Tahiti
Slovakia	5–0	Fiji
Tahiti	1–4	Fiji
Sri Lanka	5–0	Slovakia

== Knockout stage ==
=== Classification bracket ===
Thirteenth place match
Vietnam	3
Singapore	1

Fifteenth place match
Canada	2
Australia	3

Seventeenth place match
Scotland	3
United States	0

Nineteenth place match
New Zealand	3
Austria	1

Twenty-first place match
Macau	0
Sri Lanka	3

Twenty-third place match
New Caledonia	0
Slovakia	3

Twenty-fifth place match
Guam	1
Fiji	3

=== Classification round ===
Team 1	Score	Team 2
Guam	1–3	Fiji
New Caledonia	1–3	Slovakia
Macau	0–3	Sri Lanka
New Zealand	3–1	Austria
Scotland	3–0	United States
Canada	2–3	Australia
Vietnam	3–1	Singapore

=== Final draw ===
The draw for the quarterfinals will be held after the completion of the final matches in the group stage on 24 May 2017.

Position	Team 1	vs	Team 2	Position
A1	China	vs	India	D2
C1	Japan	vs	Malaysia	C2
B2	South Korea	vs	Chinese Taipei	B1
A2	Thailand	vs	Denmark	D1

=== Final bracket ===
Quarter-finals
26 May – Gold Coast
China	3
India	0
26 May – Gold Coast
Japan	3
Malaysia	1
25 May – Gold Coast
South Korea	3
Chinese Taipei	1
25 May – Gold Coast
Thailand	3
Denmark	2

Semi-finals
27 May – Gold Coast
China	3
Japan	2
27 May – Gold Coast
South Korea	3
Thailand	1

Final
28 May – Gold Coast
China	2
South Korea	3

=== Quarter-finals ===
Team 1	Score	Team 2
China	3–0	India
Japan	3–1	Malaysia
South Korea	3–1	Chinese Taipei
Thailand	3–2	Denmark

=== Semi-finals ===
Team 1	Score	Team 2
China	3–2	Japan
South Korea	3–1	Thailand

=== Final ===
Team 1	Score	Team 2
China	2–3	South Korea

2017 Sudirman Cup champions

South Korea
4th title

== Final ranking ==
Pos	Team	Pld	W	L	Pts	Final result
1st place, gold medalist(s)	South Korea	5	4	1	4	Champions
2nd place, silver medalist(s)	China	5	4	1	4	Runners-up
3rd place, bronze medalist(s)	Japan	4	3	1	3	Eliminated in Semi-finals
3rd place, bronze medalist(s)	Thailand	4	2	2	2	Eliminated in Semi-finals
5	Denmark	3	1	2	1	Eliminated in Quarter-finals
5	Chinese Taipei	3	2	1	2	Eliminated in Quarter-finals
5	Malaysia	3	1	2	1	Eliminated in Quarter-finals
5	India	3	1	2	1	Eliminated in Quarter-finals
9	Indonesia	2	1	1	1	Eliminated in Group stage
9	Hong Kong	2	0	2	0	Eliminated in Group stage
9	Russia	2	0	2	0	Eliminated in Group stage
9	Germany	2	0	2	0	Eliminated in Group stage
13	Vietnam	4	4	0	4	Group 2
14	Singapore	4	3	1	3	Group 2
15	Australia	4	3	1	3	Group 2
16	Canada	4	2	2	2	Group 2
17	Scotland	4	2	2	2	Group 2
18	United States	4	1	3	1	Group 2
19	New Zealand	4	1	3	1	Group 2
20	Austria	4	0	4	0	Group 2
21	Sri Lanka	4	4	0	4	Group 3
22	Macau	3	2	1	2	Group 3
23	Slovakia	4	3	1	3	Group 3
24	New Caledonia	3	1	2	1	Group 3
25	Fiji	4	2	2	2	Group 3
26	Guam	3	0	3	0	Group 3
27	Tahiti	3	0	3	0	Group 3
