= Peter Zauner =

Austrian badminton player

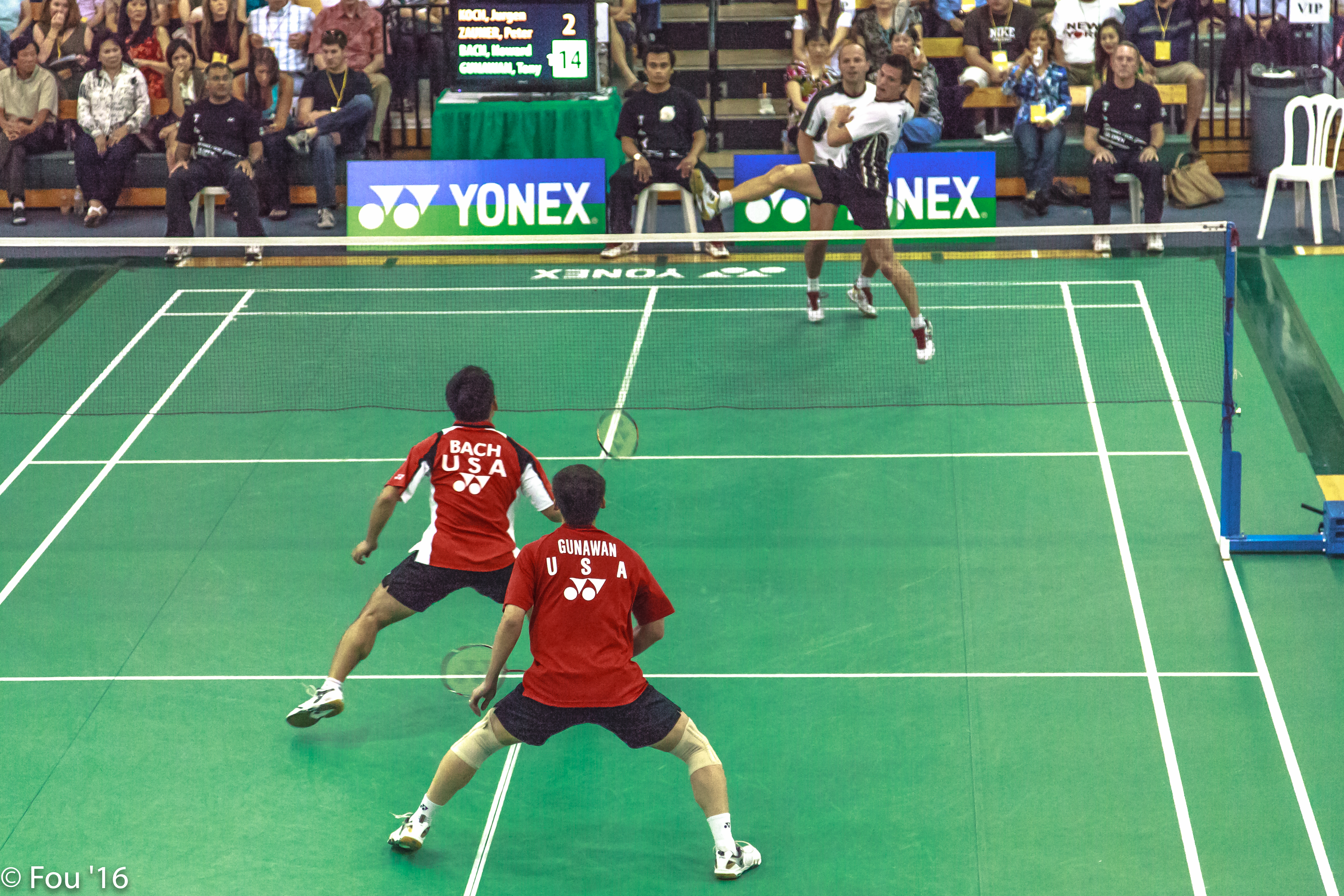
- At the U. S. Open 2009

Personal information
- Born: 30 May 1983 (age 43) Ried im Innkreis, Innviertel, Upper Austria, Austria
- Height: 1.67 m (5 ft 6 in)
- Weight: 66 kg (146 lb)

Sport
- Country: Austria
- Sport: Badminton
- Handedness: Right

Doubles
- Highest ranking: 22 (MD with Jürgen Koch)
- BWF profile

Peter Zauner (born 30 May 1983) is a retired Austrian badminton player from ASKÖ Traun club who won National Championships for 13 times.

Zauner became the National Junior Champion in 2001. Five further junior titles followed from 2003 to 2005. In 2005 he also won the adult category for the first time and won the Hungarian International and Slovak International. In 2006 he won the Austrian International, 2009 the Slovenian International and 2010 the Romanian International. Zauner ended his international career in 2014. Since 2018 he has been the sports coordinator of the Upper Austrian Badminton Association. In addition, he also studied Marketing Studies from Steyr in Austria. He and his partner Jürgen Koch dominated the Austrian badminton for nearly 25 years. They were one of the strongest doubles pair Austria has produced who reached highest world ranking of 22 in their peak period. Zauner won Austrian national championships for 13 times, two times in singles; eleven times in men's doubles (with Harald Koch and Jürgen Koch).

== Achievements ==
=== BWF Grand Prix ===
The BWF Grand Prix has two level such as Grand Prix and Grand Prix Gold. It is a series of badminton tournaments, sanctioned by Badminton World Federation (BWF) since 2007.

Men's doubles
Year	Tournament	Partner	Opponent	Score	Result
2009	U. S. Open	(Austria) Jürgen Koch	(United States) Howard Bach (United States) Tony Gunawan	12–21, 9–21	(silver) Runner-up

=== BWF/IBF International ===
Men's doubles
Year	Tournament	Partner	Opponent	Score	Result
2011	Belgian International	(Austria) Jürgen Koch	(Poland) Adam Cwalina (Poland) Michał Łogosz	11–21, 15–21	(silver) Runner-up
2011	Maldives International	(Austria) Jürgen Koch	(Singapore) Ashton Chen Yong Zhao (Singapore) Derek Wong	19–21, 17–21	(silver) Runner-up
2011	Slovenian International	(Austria) Jürgen Koch	(Poland) Łukasz Moreń (Poland) Wojciech Szkudlarczyk	13–21, 14–21	(silver) Runner-up
2010	Banuinvest International	(Austria) Jürgen Koch	(Singapore) Chayut Triyachart (Singapore) Danny Bawa Chrisnanta	21–16, 21–15	(gold) Winner
2009	Slovenian International	(Austria) Jürgen Koch	(Austria) Daniel Graßmück (Austria) Roman Zirnwald	21–18, 21–14	(gold) Winner
2008	Slovenian International	(Austria) Michael Lahnsteiner	(Czech Republic) Ondřej Kopřiva (Czech Republic) Tomáš Kopřiva	21–17, 21–12	(gold) Winner
2008	Welsh International	(Austria) Jürgen Koch	(Scotland) Andrew Bowman (Wales) Martyn Lewis	21–14, 15–21, 13–21	(silver) Runner-up
2006	Austrian International	(Austria) Jürgen Koch	(Germany) Ingo Kindervater (Germany) Tim Dettmann	21–18, 21–13	(gold) Winner
2005	Iceland International	(Austria) Jürgen Koch	(Denmark) Anders Kristiansen (Denmark) Simon Mollyhus	13–15, 6–15	(silver) Runner-up
2005	Hungarian International	(Austria) Jürgen Koch	(France) Mihail Popov (France) Svetoslav Stoyanov	15–5, 15–9	(gold) Winner
2005	Slovak International	(Austria) Jürgen Koch	(Poland) Łukasz Moreń (Poland) Wojciech Szkudlarczyk	15–10, 15–3	(gold) Winner
2004	Croatian International	(Austria) Harald Koch	(Sweden) Daniel Glaser (Sweden) Dennis von Dahn	5–15, 10–15	(silver) Runner-up

Mixed doubles
Year	Tournament	Partner	Opponent	Score	Result
2009	Slovenian International	(Austria) Simone Prutsch	(Denmark) Martin Kragh (Denmark) Louise Hansen	21–23, 21–17, 21–17	(gold) Winner

BWF International Challenge tournament
BWF International Series tournament
