= 2017 Sudirman Cup group stage =

The group stage of the 2017 Sudirman Cup was the first stage of the competition. It began on 21 May and ended on 25 May, held at Carrara Sport and Leisure Centre in Gold Coast, Australia. The top two teams from each group (8 in total) advanced to the final knockout stage to compete in a single-elimination tournament. The teams from group 2 and 3 (14 in total) advanced to the final classification stage to compete in a single-elimination tournament.

== Seedings ==
The seedings for 32 teams competing in the tournament were released on March 2, 2017. It was based on aggregated points from the best players in the world ranking. The tournament was divided into four groups, with twelve teams in the elite group competing for the title. Eight teams were seeded into second and third groups and four remaining teams were seeded into fourth group.

On the day of the draw, it was announced that the original list of 32 teams was pared down to 28, with four teams – Mexico, Netherlands, Spain and Sweden were withdrawing from the tournament. The 28 participating teams were divided into four groups, with Group 1 consisting of the 12 teams that will compete for the title. Group 2 and Group 3 (eight teams each) will fight for overall placings. The draw was held on March 17, 2017. England withdrew from the Sudirman Cup on April 4, 2017.

Group 1	Group 2	Group 3	Group 4
1. China; 2. Denmark; 3. South Korea; 4. Japan; 5. Malaysia; 6. Indonesia; 7. Thailand; 8. Chinese Taipei; 9. India; 10. ~~England~~; 11. Hong Kong; 12. Russia	13. Germany; 14. Singapore; 15. ~~Netherlands~~; 16. Australia; 17. Vietnam; 18. ~~Sweden~~; 19. ~~Spain~~; 20. United States	21. Scotland; 22. Canada; 23. Austria; 24. ~~Mexico~~; 25. New Zealand; 26. Sri Lanka; 27. Slovakia; 28. New Caledonia	29. Macau; 30. Tahiti; 31. Fiji; 32. Guam

=== Group composition ===
Group 1				Group 2		Group 3	
Group 1A	Group 1B	Group 1C	Group 1D	Group 2A	Group 2B	Group 3A	Group 3B
China; Thailand; Hong Kong	South Korea; Chinese Taipei; Russia	Japan; Malaysia; Germany	Denmark; Indonesia; India	Vietnam; Scotland; Canada; New Zealand	Singapore; Australia; United States; Austria	New Caledonia; Macau; Guam	Sri Lanka; Slovakia; Fiji; Tahiti

== Group 1A ==
Pos	Team	Pld	W	L	MW	ML	GW	GL	PW	PL	Pts	Qualification
1	China	2	2	0	9	1	19	2	440	331	2	Quarter-finals
2	Thailand	2	1	1	3	7	7	15	365	429	1	Quarter-finals
3	Hong Kong	2	0	2	3	7	7	16	384	449	0	

=== China vs Hong Kong ===
China
4
Carrara Sport and Leisure Centre, Court 1
21 May 2017

Hong Kong
1

			1	2	3
1	(China) (Hong Kong)	Fu Haifeng / Zhang Nan; Law Cheuk Him / Lee Chun Hei Reginald	21; 15	26; 24
2	(China) (Hong Kong)	Sun Yu; Fan Ka Yan	21; 12	21; 13
3	(China) (Hong Kong)	Lin Dan; Hu Yun	21; 14	21; 13
4	(China) (Hong Kong)	Bao Yixin / Tang Jinhua; Ng Tsz Yau / Yeung Nga Ting	21; 11	21; 13
5	(China) (Hong Kong)	Zheng Siwei / Chen Qingchen; Tang Chun Man / Tse Ying Suet	21; 10	16; 21	18; 21

=== Thailand vs Hong Kong ===
Thailand
3
Carrara Sport and Leisure Centre, Court 1
22 May 2017

Hong Kong
2

			1	2	3
1	(Thailand) (Hong Kong)	Bodin Isara / Nipitphon Phuangphuapet; Or Chin Chung / Tang Chun Man	22; 20	17; 21	21; 11
2	(Thailand) (Hong Kong)	Ratchanok Intanon; Yip Pui Yin	21; 14	21; 17
3	(Thailand) (Hong Kong)	Tanongsak Saensomboonsuk; Ng Ka Long Angus	11; 21	16; 21
4	(Thailand) (Hong Kong)	Jongkolphan Kititharakul / Rawinda Prajongjai; Poon Lok Yan / Tse Ying Suet	15; 21	21; 18	14; 21
5	(Thailand) (Hong Kong)	Dechapol Puavaranukroh / Sapsiree Taerattanachai; Lee Chun Hei Reginald / Chau Hoi Wah	21; 16	21; 16

=== China vs Thailand ===
China
5
Carrara Sport and Leisure Centre, Court 2
24 May 2017

Thailand
0

			1	2	3
1	(China) (Thailand)	Li Junhui / Liu Yuchen; Kittinupong Kedren / Dechapol Puavaranukroh	21; 11	21; 19
2	(China) (Thailand)	Chen Yufei; Pornpawee Chochuwong	21; 16	21; 15
3	(China) (Thailand)	Chen Long; Khosit Phetpradab	21; 13	21; 12
4	(China) (Thailand)	Chen Qingchen / Jia Yifan; Jongkolphan Kititharakul / Sapsiree Taerattanachai	23; 21	21; 18
5	(China) (Thailand)	Lu Kai / Huang Yaqiong; Bodin Isara / Savitree Amitrapai	21; 8	21; 11

== Group 1B ==
Pos	Team	Pld	W	L	MW	ML	GW	GL	PW	PL	Pts	Qualification
1	Chinese Taipei	2	2	0	7	3	15	9	464	415	2	Quarter-finals
2	South Korea	2	1	1	6	4	14	8	425	352	1	Quarter-finals
3	Russia	2	0	2	2	8	5	17	328	450	0	

=== Korea vs Russia ===
South Korea
4
Carrara Sport and Leisure Centre, Court 1
21 May 2017

Russia
1

			1	2	3
1	(South Korea) (Russia)	Kim Won-ho / Seo Seung-jae; Vladimir Ivanov / Ivan Sozonov	18; 21	18; 21
2	(South Korea) (Russia)	Sung Ji-hyun; Evgeniya Kosetskaya	21; 10	21; 13
3	(South Korea) (Russia)	Jeon Hyeok-jin; Sergey Sirant	21; 6	21; 13
4	(South Korea) (Russia)	Jung Kyung-eun / Kim Ha-na; Ekaterina Bolotova / Alina Davletova	21; 7	21; 17
5	(South Korea) (Russia)	Choi Sol-gyu / Chae Yoo-jung; Evgenia Dimova / Evgenij Dremin	21; 14	21; 12

=== Chinese Taipei vs Russia ===
Chinese Taipei
4
Carrara Sport and Leisure Centre, Court 2
22 May 2017

Russia
1

			1	2	3
1	(Chinese Taipei) (Russia)	Wang Chi-lin / Lee Chia-hsin; Ekaterina Bolotova / Vladimir Ivanov	21; 19	21; 11
2	(Chinese Taipei) (Russia)	Chou Tien-chen; Sergey Sirant	21; 7	18; 21	21; 16
3	(Chinese Taipei) (Russia)	Lee Jhe-huei / Lee Yang; Vladimir Ivanov / Ivan Sozonov	21; 19	19; 21	17; 21
4	(Chinese Taipei) (Russia)	Tai Tzu-ying; Evgeniya Kosetskaya	21; 13	21; 11
5	(Chinese Taipei) (Russia)	Hsu Ya-ching / Wu Ti-jung; Ekaterina Bolotova / Alina Davletova	21; 13	24; 22

=== Korea vs Chinese Taipei ===
South Korea
2
Carrara Sport and Leisure Centre, Court 1
24 May 2017

Chinese Taipei
3

			1	2	3
1	(South Korea) (Chinese Taipei)	Kim Duk-young / Park Kyung-hoon; Chen Hung-ling / Wang Chi-lin	19; 21	13; 21
2	(South Korea) (Chinese Taipei)	Sung Ji-hyun; Tai Tzu-ying	15; 21	21; 15	14; 21
3	(South Korea) (Chinese Taipei)	Son Wan-ho; Chou Tien-chen	21; 18	21; 17
4	(South Korea) (Chinese Taipei)	Chang Ye-na / Lee So-hee; Hsu Ya-ching / Wu Ti-jung	21; 13	21; 18
5	(South Korea) (Chinese Taipei)	Choi Sol-gyu / Chae Yoo-jung; Wang Chi-lin / Lee Chia-hsin	21; 11	18; 21	16; 21

== Group 1C ==
Pos	Team	Pld	W	L	MW	ML	GW	GL	PW	PL	Pts	Qualification
1	Japan	2	2	0	7	3	15	8	420	371	2	Quarter-finals
2	Malaysia	2	1	1	7	3	15	7	422	347	1	Quarter-finals
3	Germany	2	0	2	1	9	3	18	293	417	0	

=== Japan vs Germany ===
Japan
4
Carrara Sport and Leisure Centre, Court 2
21 May 2017

Germany
1

			1	2	3
1	(Japan) (Germany)	Takeshi Kamura / Keigo Sonoda; Mark Lamsfuß / Marvin Seidel	21; 12	21; 19
2	(Japan) (Germany)	Nozomi Okuhara; Yvonne Li	21; 10	21; 5
3	(Japan) (Germany)	Kenta Nishimoto; Marc Zwiebler	8; 21	18; 21
4	(Japan) (Germany)	Misaki Matsutomo / Ayaka Takahashi; Linda Efler / Lara Käpplein	21; 11	21; 6
5	(Japan) (Germany)	Kenta Kazuno / Ayane Kurihara; Mark Lamsfuß / Isabel Herttrich	21; 17	13; 21	21; 16

=== Malaysia vs Germany ===
Malaysia
5
Carrara Sport and Leisure Centre, Court 1
23 May 2017

Germany
0

			1	2	3
1	(Malaysia) (Germany)	Tan Kian Meng / Lai Pei Jing; Mark Lamsfuss / Isabel Herttrich	21; 17	21; 13
2	(Malaysia) (Germany)	Lee Chong Wei; Fabian Roth	21; 12	21; 11
3	(Malaysia) (Germany)	Goh V Shem / Tan Wee Kiong; Jones Ralfy Jansen / Josche Zurwonne	21; 16	21; 19
4	(Malaysia) (Germany)	Goh Jin Wei; Fabienne Deprez	21; 10	21; 13
5	(Malaysia) (Germany)	Vivian Hoo Kah Mun / Woon Khe Wei; Johanna Goliszewski / Isabel Herttrich	21; 12	21; 11

=== Japan vs Malaysia ===
Japan
3
Carrara Sport and Leisure Centre, Court 1
24 May 2017

Malaysia
2

			1	2	3
1	(Japan) (Malaysia)	Takeshi Kamura / Keigo Sonoda; Goh V Shem / Tan Wee Kiong	18; 21	21; 17	21; 16
2	(Japan) (Malaysia)	Akane Yamaguchi; Goh Jin Wei	21; 6	21; 17
3	(Japan) (Malaysia)	Yu Igarashi; Lee Chong Wei	8; 21	5; 21
4	(Japan) (Malaysia)	Misaki Matsutomo / Ayaka Takahashi; Chow Mei Kuan / Lee Meng Yean	21; 17	21; 18
5	(Japan) (Malaysia)	Yuta Watanabe / Arisa Higashino; Tan Kian Meng / Lai Pei Jing	16; 21	21; 16	19; 21

== Group 1D ==
Pos	Team	Pld	W	L	MW	ML	GW	GL	PW	PL	Pts	Qualification
1	Denmark	2	1	1	6	4	14	12	476	480	1	Quarter-finals
2	India	2	1	1	5	5	12	11	415	419	1	Quarter-finals
3	Indonesia	2	1	1	4	6	11	14	468	460	1	

=== Denmark vs India ===
Denmark
4
Carrara Sport and Leisure Centre, Court 1
22 May 2017

India
1

			1	2	3
1	(Denmark) (India)	Joachim Fischer Nielsen / Christinna Pedersen; Ashwini Ponnappa / Satwiksairaj Rankireddy	21; 15	16; 21	21; 17
2	(Denmark) (India)	Viktor Axelsen; Ajay Jayaram	21; 12	21; 7
3	(Denmark) (India)	Mathias Boe / Carsten Mogensen; Manu Attri / B. Sumeeth Reddy	21; 17	21; 15
4	(Denmark) (India)	Line Kjaersfeldt; P. V. Sindhu	18; 21	6; 21
5	(Denmark) (India)	Kamilla Rytter Juhl / Christinna Pedersen; Ashwini Ponnappa / N. Sikki Reddy	18; 21	21; 15	23; 21

=== Indonesia vs India ===
Indonesia
1
Carrara Sport and Leisure Centre, Court 1
23 May 2017

India
4

			1	2	3
1	(Indonesia) (India)	Tontowi Ahmad / Gloria Emanuelle Widjaja; Satwiksairaj Rankireddy / Ashwini Ponnappa	20; 22	21; 17	19; 21
2	(Indonesia) (India)	Jonatan Christie; Srikanth Kidambi	15; 21	16; 21
3	(Indonesia) (India)	Marcus Fernaldi Gideon / Kevin Sanjaya Sukamuljo; Satwiksairaj Rankireddy / Chirag Shetty	21; 9	21; 17
4	(Indonesia) (India)	Fitriani; P. V. Sindhu	8; 21	19; 21
5	(Indonesia) (India)	Della Destiara Haris / Rosyita Eka Putri Sari; Ashwini Ponnappa / N. Sikki Reddy	12; 21	19; 21

=== Denmark vs Indonesia ===
Denmark
2
Carrara Sport and Leisure Centre, Court 2
24 May 2017

Indonesia
3

			1	2	3
1	(Denmark) (Indonesia)	Joachim Fischer Nielsen / Christinna Pedersen; Praveen Jordan / Debby Susanto	12; 21	13; 21
2	(Denmark) (Indonesia)	Viktor Axelsen; Anthony Sinisuka Ginting	21; 13	17; 21	14; 21
3	(Denmark) (Indonesia)	Mathias Boe / Carsten Mogensen; Marcus Fernaldi Gideon / Kevin Sanjaya Sukamuljo	16; 21	24; 22	23; 21
4	(Denmark) (Indonesia)	Mia Blichfeldt; Fitriani	24; 22	15; 21	14; 21
5	(Denmark) (Indonesia)	Kamilla Rytter Juhl / Christinna Pedersen; Greysia Polii / Apriani Rahayu	21; 18	13; 21	21; 13

== Group 2A ==
Pos	Team	Pld	W	L	MW	ML	GW	GL	PW	PL	Pts	Qualification
1	Vietnam	3	3	0	13	2	28	6	685	500	3	Classification round
2	Canada	3	2	1	8	7	17	19	648	640	2	Classification round
3	Scotland	3	1	2	7	8	18	19	663	650	1	Classification round
4	New Zealand	3	0	3	2	13	9	28	525	731	0	Classification round

=== Vietnam vs New Zealand ===
Vietnam
4
Carrara Sport and Leisure Centre, Court 2
21 May 2017

New Zealand
1

			1	2	3
1	(Vietnam) (New Zealand)	Đỗ Tuấn Đức / Phạm Như Thảo; Oliver Leydon-Davis / Susannah Leydon-Davis	21; 13	18; 21	22; 20
2	(Vietnam) (New Zealand)	Nguyễn Tiến Minh; Dylan Soedjasa	21; 8	21; 7
3	(Vietnam) (New Zealand)	Đỗ Tuấn Đức / Phạm Hồng Nam; Oliver Leydon-Davis / Kevin Dennerly-Minturn	18; 21	21; 14	12; 21
4	(Vietnam) (New Zealand)	Vũ Thị Trang; Sally Fu	21; 6	21; 5
5	(Vietnam) (New Zealand)	Nguyễn Thùy Linh / Phạm Như Thảo; Anona Pak / Danielle Tahuri	21; 16	21; 11

=== Scotland vs Canada ===
Scotland
2
Carrara Sport and Leisure Centre, Court 4
21 May 2017

Canada
3

			1	2	3
1	(Scotland) (Canada)	Adam Hall / Eleanor O'Donnell; Rachel Honderich / Nyl Yakura	14; 21	21; 17	21; 10
2	(Scotland) (Canada)	Kieran Merrilees; Jason Ho-Shue	21; 18	21; 12
3	(Scotland) (Canada)	Kirsty Gilmour; Michelle Li	12; 21	24; 22	18; 21
4	(Scotland) (Canada)	Martin Campbell / Patrick MacHugh; Jason Ho-Shue / Nyl Yakura	24; 22	21; 23	17; 21
5	(Scotland) (Canada)	Julie MacPherson / Eleanor O'Donnell; Rachel Honderich / Michelle Li	6; 21	11; 21

=== Vietnam vs Canada ===
Vietnam
5
Carrara Sport and Leisure Centre, Court 2
23 May 2017

Canada
0

			1	2	3
1	(Vietnam) (Canada)	Đỗ Tuấn Đức / Phạm Như Thảo; Brittney Tam / Nyl Yakura	21; 13	21; 18
2	(Vietnam) (Canada)	Nguyễn Tiến Minh; Jason Ho-shue	21; 19	21; 11
3	(Vietnam) (Canada)	Đỗ Tuấn Đức / Phạm Hồng Nam; Phillipe Gaumond / Maxime Marin	21; 18	21; 18
4	(Vietnam) (Canada)	Nguyễn Thùy Linh; Brittney Tam	21; 12	21; 12
5	(Vietnam) (Canada)	Phạm Như Thảo / Vũ Thị Trang; Michelle Tong / Josephine Wu	21; 9	21; 13

=== Scotland vs New Zealand ===
Scotland
4
Carrara Sport and Leisure Centre, Court 4
23 May 2017

New Zealand
1

			1	2	3
1	(Scotland) (New Zealand)	Martin Campbell / Patrick MacHugh; Kevin Dennerly-Minturn / Oliver Leydon-Davis	19; 21	21; 10	21; 15
2	(Scotland) (New Zealand)	Kirsty Gilmour; Gaea Galvez	21; 5	21; 9
3	(Scotland) (New Zealand)	Kieran Merrilees; Oscar Guo	21; 15	21; 18
4	(Scotland) (New Zealand)	Kirsty Gilmour / Julie MacPherson; Sally Fu / Danielle Tahuri	21; 9	21; 7
5	(Scotland) (New Zealand)	Adam Hall / Eleanor O'Donnell; Oliver Leydon-Davis / Susannah Leydon-Davis	17; 21	21; 12	13; 21

=== Canada vs New Zealand ===
Canada
5
Carrara Sport and Leisure Centre, Court 3
24 May 2017

New Zealand
0

			1	2	3
1	(Canada) (New Zealand)	Jason Ho-shue / Nyl Yakura; Kevin Dennerly-Minturn / Oliver Leydon-Davis	22; 20	16; 21	21; 19
2	(Canada) (New Zealand)	Rachel Honderich; Sally Fu	21; 5	21; 18
3	(Canada) (New Zealand)	Rachel Honderich; Dylan Soedjasa	21; 12	21; 16
4	(Canada) (New Zealand)	Rachel Honderich / Michelle Li; Anona Pak / Danielle Tahuri	19; 21	21; 14	21; 14
5	(Canada) (New Zealand)	Josephine Wu / Nyl Yakura; Oliver Leydon-Davis / Susannah Leydon-Davis	9; 21	21; 10	21; 18

=== Vietnam vs Scotland ===
Vietnam
4
Carrara Sport and Leisure Centre, Court 3
24 May 2017

Scotland
1

			1	2	3
1	(Vietnam) (Scotland)	Đỗ Tuấn Đức / Phạm Như Thảo; Adam Hall / Eleanor O'Donnell	21; 15	21; 16
2	(Vietnam) (Scotland)	Nguyễn Tiến Minh; Kieran Merrilees	21; 12	21; 12
3	(Vietnam) (Scotland)	Vũ Thị Trang; Kirsty Gilmour	21; 19	21; 17
4	(Vietnam) (Scotland)	Đỗ Tuấn Đức / Phạm Hồng Nam; Martin Campbell / Patrick MacHugh	21; 16	16; 21	21; 11
5	(Vietnam) (Scotland)	Phạm Như Thảo / Vũ Thị Trang; Kirsty Gilmour / Julie MacPherson	16; 21	21; 13	16; 21

== Group 2B ==
Pos	Team	Pld	W	L	MW	ML	GW	GL	PW	PL	Pts	Qualification
1	Singapore	3	3	0	14	1	28	5	674	494	3	Classification round
2	Australia	3	2	1	10	5	20	10	567	466	2	Classification round
3	United States	3	1	2	4	11	10	22	527	581	1	Classification round
4	Austria	3	0	3	2	13	6	27	439	666	0	Classification round

=== Australia vs United States ===
Australia
4
Carrara Sport and Leisure Centre, Court 2
22 May 2017

United States
1

			1	2	3
1	(Australia) (United States)	Setyana Mapasa / Sawan Serasinghe; Vinson Chiu / Jamie Subandhi	21; 10	21; 12
2	(Australia) (United States)	Anthony Joe; Timothy Lam	14; 21	18; 21
3	(Australia) (United States)	Matthew Chau / Sawan Serasinghe; Kyle Emerick / Darren Yang	21; 19	21; 17
4	(Australia) (United States)	Wendy Chen Hsuan-yu; Jennie Gai	21; 18	21; 9
5	(Australia) (United States)	Setyana Mapasa / Gronya Somerville; Annie Xu / Kerry Xu	21; 15	21; 18

=== Singapore vs Austria ===
Singapore
5
Carrara Sport and Leisure Centre, Court 2
22 May 2017

Austria
0

			1	2	3
1	(Singapore) (Austria)	Danny Bawa Chrisnanta / Tan Wei Han; Antonia Meinke / Roman Zirnwald	21; 8	21; 12
2	(Singapore) (Austria)	Zin Rei Ryan Ng; Leon Seiwald	22; 20	19; 21	21; 17
3	(Singapore) (Austria)	Loh Kean Hean / Terry Hee Yong Kai; Dominik Stipsits / Roman Zirnwald	19; 21	21; 17	21; 16
4	(Singapore) (Austria)	Yeo Jia Min; Katharina Hochmeir	21; 5	21; 8
5	(Singapore) (Austria)	Ong Ren Ne / Jia Ying Crystal Wong; Serena Au Yeong / Antonia Meinke	21; 14	21; 18

=== Australia vs Austria ===
Australia
5
Carrara Sport and Leisure Centre, Court 2
23 May 2017

Austria
0

			1	2	3
1	(Australia) (Austria)	Setyana Mapasa / Sawan Serasinghe; Serena Au Yeong / Luka Wraber	21; 13	21; 12
2	(Australia) (Austria)	Ashwant Gobinathan; Vilson Vattanirappel	21; 11	21; 10
3	(Australia) (Austria)	Matthew Chau / Sawan Serasinghe; Dominik Stipsits / Roman Zirnwald	21; 11	21; 12
4	(Australia) (Austria)	Wendy Chen Hsuan-yu; Katharina Hochmeir	21; 7	21; 10
5	(Australia) (Austria)	Setyana Mapasa / Gronya Somerville; Serena Au Yeong / Antonia Meinke	21; 13	21; 11

=== Singapore vs United States ===
Singapore
5
Carrara Sport and Leisure Centre, Court 4
23 May 2017

United States
0

			1	2	3
1	(Singapore) (United States)	Danny Bawa Chrisnanta / Loh Kean Hean; Vinson Chiu / Timothy Lam	21; 10	21; 12
2	(Singapore) (United States)	Grace Chua Hui Zhen; Crystal Pan	22; 16	21; 16
3	(Singapore) (United States)	Zin Rei Ryan Ng; Nicholas Robert Henson Waller	21; 12	21; 18
4	(Singapore) (United States)	Ong Ren Ne / Jia Ying Crystal Wong; Annie Xu / Kerry Xu	18; 21	21; 15	22; 20
5	(Singapore) (United States)	Terry Hee Yong Kai / Tan Wei Han; Kyle Emerick / Jennie Gai	21; 15	21; 15

=== United States vs Austria ===
United States
3
Carrara Sport and Leisure Centre, Court 4
24 May 2017

Austria
2

			1	2	3
1	(United States) (Austria)	Timothy Lam; Luka Wraber	19; 21	13; 21
2	(United States) (Austria)	Jamie Subandhi; Katharina Hochmeir	22; 7	21; 6
3	(United States) (Austria)	Kyle Emerick / Jennie Gai; Dominik Stipsits / Roman Zirnwald	21; 15	18; 21	10; 21
4	(United States) (Austria)	Annie Xu / Kerry Xu; Serena Au Yeong / Antonia Meinke	21; 12	21; 3
5	(United States) (Austria)	Vinson Chiu / Jamie Subandhi; Antonia Meinke / Roman Zirnwald	21; 18	21; 7

=== Singapore vs Australia ===
Singapore
4
Carrara Sport and Leisure Centre, Court 1
25 May 2017

Australia
1

			1	2	3
1	(Singapore) (Australia)	Terry Hee Yong Kai / Tan Wei Han; Setyana Mapasa / Sawan Serasinghe	21; 16	21; 6
2	(Singapore) (Australia)	Zin Rei Ryan Ng; Ashwant Gobinathan	21; 16	21; 14
3	(Singapore) (Australia)	Danny Bawa Chrisnanta / Terry Hee Yong Kai; Matthew Chau / Sawan Serasinghe	21; 14	23; 21
4	(Singapore) (Australia)	Yeo Jia Min; Wendy Chen Hsuan-yu	21; 11	21; 17
5	(Singapore) (Australia)	Ong Ren Ne / Jia Ying Crystal Wong; Setyana Mapasa / Gronya Somerville	11; 21	15; 21

== Group 3A ==
Pos	Team	Pld	W	L	MW	ML	GW	GL	PW	PL	Pts	Qualification
1	Macau	2	2	0	10	0	20	2	461	251	2	Classification round
2	New Caledonia	2	1	1	4	6	9	12	346	370	1	Classification round
3	Guam	2	0	2	1	9	3	18	251	437	0	Classification round

=== New Caledonia vs Guam ===
New Caledonia
4
Carrara Sport and Leisure Centre, Court 3
21 May 2017

Guam
1

			1	2	3
1	(New Caledonia) (Guam)	Jeremy Lemaitre; Sunardi Li	21; 8	21; 11
2	(New Caledonia) (Guam)	Johanna Kou; Grace Cai	21; 13	23; 21
3	(New Caledonia) (Guam)	Ronan Ho-Yagues / Morgan Paitio; Sunardi Li / David Yao	21; 7	21; 15
4	(New Caledonia) (Guam)	Dgenyva Matauli / Cecilia Moussy; Grace Cai / Sarah Cai	18; 21	20; 22
5	(New Caledonia) (Guam)	Johanna Kou / Morgan Paitio; Sarah Cai / David Yao	21; 10	21; 10

=== Macau vs Guam ===
Macau
5
Carrara Sport and Leisure Centre, Court 3
22 May 2017

Guam
0

			1	2	3
1	(Macau) (Guam)	Pang Fong Pui; Sunardi Li	21; 6	21; 4
2	(Macau) (Guam)	Chan Kit Lei; Grace Cai	21; 15	19; 21	21; 10
3	(Macau) (Guam)	Pui Ngai Che / Lam Hou Him; Sunardi Li / David Yao	21; 8	21; 11
4	(Macau) (Guam)	Xue Xin Gong / Weng Chi Ng; Grace Cai / Sarah Cai	21; 9	21; 8
5	(Macau) (Guam)	Kit Ieng Wong / U Ieong Iek; Sarah Cai / David Yao	21; 11	21; 10

=== New Caledonia vs Macau ===
New Caledonia
0
Carrara Sport and Leisure Centre, Court 3
23 May 2017

Macau
5

			1	2	3
1	(New Caledonia) (Macau)	Ronan Ho-Yagues / Morgan Paitio; Pui Ngai Che / Lam Hou Him	20; 22	21; 18	12; 21
2	(New Caledonia) (Macau)	Dgenyva Matauli; Weng Chi Ng	6; 21	11; 21
3	(New Caledonia) (Macau)	Jeremy Lemaitre; Pang Fong Pui	9; 21	22; 24
4	(New Caledonia) (Macau)	Johanna Kou / Dgenyva Matauli; Xue Xin Gong / Weng Chi Ng	6; 21	6; 21
5	(New Caledonia) (Macau)	Yohan De Geoffroy / Johanna Kou; U Ieong Iek / Kit Ieng Wong	11; 21	14; 21

== Group 3B ==
Pos	Team	Pld	W	L	MW	ML	GW	GL	PW	PL	Pts	Qualification
1	Sri Lanka	3	3	0	15	0	30	0	630	249	3	Classification round
2	Slovakia	3	2	1	10	5	20	10	543	382	2	Classification round
3	Fiji	3	1	2	4	11	9	24	416	652	1	Classification round
4	Tahiti	3	0	3	1	14	4	29	376	682	0	

=== Sri Lanka vs Fiji ===
Sri Lanka
5
Carrara Sport and Leisure Centre, Court 2
21 May 2017

Fiji
0

			1	2	3
1	(Sri Lanka) (Fiji)	Dinuka Karunaratne; Martin Feussner	21; 3	21; 5
2	(Sri Lanka) (Fiji)	Thilini Pramodika Hendahewa; Karyn Gibson	21; 5	21; 3
3	(Sri Lanka) (Fiji)	Dinuka Karunaratne / Niluka Karunaratne; Ahmad Ali / Soon Seng Low	21; 5	21; 8
4	(Sri Lanka) (Fiji)	Thilini Pramodika Hendahewa / Kavindi Ishandika Sirimannage; Karyn Gibson / Danielle Whiteside	21; 8	21; 7
5	(Sri Lanka) (Fiji)	Renu Chandrika Hettiarachchige / Niluka Karunaratne; Ahmad Ali / Danielle Whiteside	21; 5	21; 10

=== Slovakia vs Tahiti ===
Slovakia
5
Carrara Sport and Leisure Centre, Court 4
21 May 2017

French Polynesia
0

			1	2	3
1	(Slovakia) (French Polynesia)	Matej Hlinican / Katarina Vargova; Rauhiri Goguenheim / Esther Tau	21; 9	21; 9
2	(Slovakia) (French Polynesia)	Milan Dratva; Louis Beaubois	21; 4	21; 9
3	(Slovakia) (French Polynesia)	Martina Repiská; Camille Lepetit	21; 4	21; 2
4	(Slovakia) (French Polynesia)	Milan Dratva / Matej Hlinican; Louis Beaubois / Rauhiri Goguenheim	21; 12	21; 19
5	(Slovakia) (French Polynesia)	Martina Repiská / Katarina Vargova; Camille Lepetit / Esther Tau	21; 6	21; 13

=== Sri Lanka vs Tahiti ===
Sri Lanka
5
Carrara Sport and Leisure Centre, Court 3
22 May 2017

French Polynesia
0

			1	2	3
1	(Sri Lanka) (French Polynesia)	Buwenaka Goonathileka / Kavindi Ishandika Sirimannage; Aurelie Bouttin / Rauhiri Goguenheim	21; 4	21; 9
2	(Sri Lanka) (French Polynesia)	Niluka Karunaratne; Louis Beaubois	21; 5	21; 4
3	(Sri Lanka) (French Polynesia)	Thilini Pramodika Hendahewa; Camille Lepetit	21; 5	21; 6
4	(Sri Lanka) (French Polynesia)	Dinuka Karunaratne / Niluka Karunaratne; Rauhiri Goguenheim / Manuarii Ly	21; 9	21; 9
5	(Sri Lanka) (French Polynesia)	Thilini Pramodika Hendahewa / Kavindi Ishandika Sirimannage; Aurelie Bouttin / Esther Tau	21; 10	21; 16

=== Slovakia vs Fiji ===
Slovakia
5
Carrara Sport and Leisure Centre, Court 4
22 May 2017

Fiji
0

			1	2	3
1	(Slovakia) (Fiji)	Milan Dratva / Katarina Vargova; Ahmad Ali / Danielle Whiteside	21; 14	21; 19
2	(Slovakia) (Fiji)	Matej Hlinican; Liam Fong	21; 10	21; 9
3	(Slovakia) (Fiji)	Martina Repiská; Karyn Gibson	21; 8	21; 2
4	(Slovakia) (Fiji)	Milan Dratva / Matej Hlinican; Ahmad Ali / Soon Seng Low	21; 9	21; 13
5	(Slovakia) (Fiji)	Martina Repiská / Katarina Vargova; Karyn Gibson / Danielle Whiteside	21; 11	21; 10

=== Tahiti vs Fiji ===
French Polynesia
1
Carrara Sport and Leisure Centre, Court 3
23 May 2017

Fiji
4

			1	2	3
1	(French Polynesia) (Fiji)	Aurelie Bouttin / Rauhiri Goguenheim; Ahmad Ali / Karyn Gibson	22; 24	22; 20	14; 21
2	(French Polynesia) (Fiji)	Louis Beaubois; Liam Fong	21; 16	17; 21	21; 18
3	(French Polynesia) (Fiji)	Camille Lepetit; Danielle Whiteside	16; 21	12; 21
4	(French Polynesia) (Fiji)	Rauhiri Goguenheim / Manuarii Ly; Ahmad Ali / Soon Seng Low	21; 16	17; 21	19; 21
5	(French Polynesia) (Fiji)	Aurelie Bouttin / Esther Tau; Karyn Gibson / Danielle Whiteside	17; 21	13; 21

=== Sri Lanka vs Slovakia ===
Sri Lanka
5
Carrara Sport and Leisure Centre, Court 4
24 May 2017

Slovakia
0

			1	2	3
1	(Sri Lanka) (Slovakia)	Buwenaka Goonathileka / Kavindi Ishandika Sirimannage; Milan Dratva / Katarina Vargova	21; 15	21; 17
2	(Sri Lanka) (Slovakia)	Niluka Karunaratne; Matej Hlinican	21; 13	21; 15
3	(Sri Lanka) (Slovakia)	Thilini Pramodika Hendahewa; Martina Repiská	21; 16	21; 19
4	(Sri Lanka) (Slovakia)	Dinuka Karunaratne / Niluka Karunaratne; Milan Dratva / Matej Hlinican	21; 11	21; 10
5	(Sri Lanka) (Slovakia)	Thilini Pramodika Hendahewa / Kavindi Ishandika Sirimannage; Martina Repiská / Katarina Vargova	21; 6	21; 11
