= Roman Zirnwald =

Austrian badminton player (born 1982)

Personal information
- Born: 25 December 1982 (age 43) Sankt Pölten, Austria
- Height: 1.85 m (6 ft 1 in)

Sport
- Country: Austria
- Sport: Badminton
- Handedness: Right

Men's & mixed doubles
- Highest ranking: 58 (MD 7 September 2017); 39 (XD 14 February 2013)
- BWF profile

Roman Zirnwald (born 25 December 1982) is an Austrian badminton player. He won his first international title by capturing two titles in the men's and mixed doubles at the 2012 Bulgaria Hebar Open. Hailing from Pottenbrunn, Sankt Pölten, he is an eleven-time Austrian National Champions. Partnered with Hendrik Westermayer, he won the gold medal in the men's doubles at the 2018 European Senior Championships. He reached a career-high of world number 58 in the men's doubles, and number 39 in the mixed doubles. After retiring from the competitive international badminton in 2018, he was assigned as Swiss national coach.

== Achievements ==
=== BWF International Challenge/Series ===
Men's doubles
Year	Tournament	Partner	Opponent	Score	Result
2009	Slovenian International	(Austria) Daniel Graßmück	(Austria) Jürgen Koch (Austria) Peter Zauner	18–21, 14–21	(silver) Runner-up
2012	Bulgaria Hebar Open	(Malaysia) Tan Chun Seang	(France) Marin Baumann (France) Lucas Corvée	21–17, 17–21, 21–11	(gold) Winner
2017	Peru International Series	(Austria) Dominik Stipsits	(Austria) Daniel Graßmück (Austria) Luka Wraber	21–14, 15–21, 15–21	(silver) Runner-up
2018	Mauritius International	(Austria) Daniel Graßmück	(Malaysia) Ng Yong Chai (Malaysia) Tee Kai Wun	21–16, 12–21, 21–14	(gold) Winner

Mixed doubles
Year	Tournament	Partner	Opponent	Score	Result
2010	Croatian International	(Austria) Simone Prutsch	(Croatia) Zvonimir Đurkinjak (Croatia) Staša Poznanović	12–21, 22–24	(silver) Runner-up
2011	Banuinvest International	(Austria) Elisabeth Baldauf	(Republic of Ireland) Sam Magee (Republic of Ireland) Chloe Magee	12–21, 21–18, 18–21	(silver) Runner-up
2012	Bulgaria Hebar Open	(Austria) Elisabeth Baldauf	(Bulgaria) Blagovest Kisyov (Bulgaria) Dimitria Popstoikova	21–14, 11–21, 21–19	(gold) Winner
2012	Banuinvest International	(Austria) Elisabeth Baldauf	(Indonesia) Edi Subaktiar (Indonesia) Melati Daeva Oktavianti	19–21, 18–21	(silver) Runner-up
2014	Portugal International	(Austria) Elisabeth Baldauf	(Denmark) Jeppe Ludvigsen (Denmark) Mai Surrow	21–19, 21–11	(gold) Winner

BWF International Challenge tournament
BWF International Series tournament
BWF Future Series tournament
