= Harald Koch =

Austrian badminton player

Personal information
- Born: 14 February 1969 (age 57) Traun, Upper Austria, Austria
- Height: 1.8 m (5 ft 11 in)

Sport
- Country: Austria
- Sport: Badminton
- Handedness: Right
- Coached by: Yan Yujiang

Men's Doubles
- Career title: 5 (Internationally)
- Highest ranking: 22 (with Jürgen Koch)
- BWF profile

Harald Koch (born 14 February 1969) is a retired Austrian badminton player from Askö Traun badminton club. He is the brother of former Olympian badminton player Jürgen Koch.

== About ==
Harald and his younger brother Jürgen Koch were born in badminton enthusiast family. Their father Herbert Koch served as the manager of Askö Traun, Austrian youth committee and as OÖBV president; and led their team in winning the Bundesliga title many times. Harald Koch won his first national title at the national junior championships in 1987. In 1991 he won the senior competition for the first time. Since then, he has won Austrian national championships for 26 times. Internationally, Harald has won titles in European grand prix, which includes his titles in Czechoslovakia, Slovakia, Romania and France and several other runner-up performances as well in Slovenia, Hungary, Austria and Croatia. At present, he is working as a Sporting goods dealer.

== Achievements ==
=== IBF International ===
Men's doubles
Year	Tournament	Partner	Opponent	Score	Result
1989	Czechoslovakian International	(Austria) Heimo Götschl	(Austria) Heinz Fischer (Austria) Klaus Fischer	15–13, 16–18, 15–13	(gold) Winner
1992	Czechoslovakian International	(Austria) Jürgen Koch	(England) Anthony Bush (England) Steffan Pandya	9–15, 9–15	(silver) Runner-up
1993	Slovenian International	(Austria) Heimo Götschl	(Ukraine) Vladislav Druzchenko (Ukraine) Valerij Strelcov	8–15, 15–7, 2–15	(silver) Runner-up
1993	Hungarian International	(Austria) Jürgen Koch	(Germany) Kai Mitteldorf (Germany) Uwe Ossenbrink	13–15, 16–17	(silver) Runner-up
1995	Hungarian International	(Austria) Jürgen Koch	(England) Julian Robertson (England) Nathan Robertson	18–15, 7–15, 13–15	(silver) Runner-up
1996	Slovak International	(Austria) Jürgen Koch	(Denmark) Jesper Mikla (Denmark) Lars Paaske	15–11, 15–8	(gold) Winner
1996	Hungarian International	(Austria) Jürgen Koch	(Denmark) Jan Jørgensen (Denmark) Jonas Rasmussen	15–18, 12–15	(silver) Runner-up
1997	Slovak International	(Austria) Jürgen Koch	(Poland) Michał Łogosz (Poland) Kamil Turonek	15–9, 15–5	(gold) Winner
1997	Slovenian International	(Austria) Jürgen Koch	(Scotland) Russell Hogg (Scotland) Kenny Middlemiss	14–18, 5–15	(silver) Runner-up
1998	La Chaux-de-Fonds International	(Austria) Jürgen Koch	(Bulgaria) Mihail Popov (Bulgaria) Svetoslav Stoyanov	–, –	(gold) Winner
1999	Romanian International	(Austria) Jürgen Koch	(France) Manuel Dubrulle (France) Vincent Laigle	15–10, 15–13	(gold) Winner
2000	Austrian International	(Austria) Jürgen Koch	(Denmark) Joachim Fischer Nielsen (Denmark) Janek Roos	15–12, 8–15, 9–15	(silver) Runner-up
2000	Romanian International	(Austria) Jürgen Koch	(Denmark) Mathias Boe (Denmark) Michael Jensen	4–15, 3–15	(silver) Runner-up
2004	Croatian International	(Austria) Peter Zauner	(Sweden) Daniel Glaser (Sweden) Dennis von Dahn	5–15, 10–15	(silver) Runner-up
