= BWF World Senior Championships =

Badminton championships

- Current season, competition or edition: 2025 BWF World Senior Championships
- Sport: Badminton
- Founded: 2003
- Country: BWF member nations

The BWF World Senior Championships is a badminton tournament for players aged 35 and older sanctioned by Badminton World Federation (BWF). The winners will be crowned as the "World Senior Champions" and awarded gold medals. However, it does not offer any prize money. The tournament started in 2003 and being held biennially.

== Location of the World Senior Championships ==
The table below gives an overview of all host cities and countries of the World Senior Championships. The number in parentheses following the city/country denotes how many times that city/country has hosted the championships.

The 2025 championships was awarded to Auckland (New Zealand) but they have withdrawn. A new bidding process was initiated by BWF in June 2024. The competition was awarded to Pattaya (Thailand) and was held 7–14 September 2025.

Host cities of the World Senior Championships

| Year | No. | Date | Host city |
|---|---|---|---|
| 2003 | I | 9 – 15 June | Sofia, Bulgaria (1) |
| 2004 | II | 29 November – 5 December | Kuala Lumpur, Malaysia (1) |
| 2007 | III | 24 – 29 April | Taipei, Taiwan (1) |
| 2009 | IV | 27 September – 3 October | Huelva, Spain (1) |
| 2011 | V | 21 – 27 August | Vancouver, Canada (1) |
| 2013 | VI | 9 – 14 August | Ankara, Turkey (1) |
| 2015 | VII | 20 – 26 September | Helsingborg, Sweden (1) |
| 2017 | VIII | 11 – 17 September | Kochi, India (1) |
| 2019 | IX | 4 – 11 August | Katowice, Poland (1) |
| 2021 | X | 28 November – 4 December | Huelva, Spain (2) |
| 2023 | XI | 11 – 17 September | Jeonju, South Korea (1) |
| 2025 | XII | 7 – 14 September | Pattaya, Thailand (1) |
| 2027 | XIII | 28 November – 5 December 2027 | Geelong, Australia (1) |

== Medal table ==
| Rank | Nation | Gold | Silver | Bronze | Total |
|---|---|---|---|---|---|
| 1 | England | 76.5 | 85.5 | 148.5 | 310.5 |
| 2 | Denmark | 68 | 61.5 | 116.5 | 246 |
| 3 | Germany | 47 | 47.5 | 84 | 178.5 |
| 4 | Japan | 41 | 58 | 117 | 216 |
| 5 | Thailand | 39 | 32.5 | 44.5 | 116 |
| 6 | Chinese Taipei | 26.5 | 21.5 | 32.5 | 80.5 |
| 7 | Indonesia | 21 | 8 | 13.5 | 42.5 |
| 8 | Scotland | 14.5 | 16 | 12.5 | 43 |
| 9 | Netherlands | 14.5 | 9.5 | 14.5 | 38.5 |
| 10 | Russia | 14 | 12.5 | 16 | 42.5 |
| 11 | India | 11 | 20 | 56 | 87 |
| 12 | Sweden | 9.5 | 18.5 | 45 | 73 |
| 13 | Canada | 9 | 15 | 29.5 | 53.5 |
| 14 | Malaysia | 8 | 7 | 23.5 | 38.5 |
| 15 | South Africa | 7.5 | 0 | 1 | 8.5 |
| 16 | Iceland | 6.5 | 0 | 3 | 9.5 |
| 17 | Israel | 6 | 1 | 0 | 7 |
| 18 | United States | 6 | 0.5 | 4.5 | 11 |
| 19 | Hong Kong | 5 | 1.5 | 3 | 9.5 |
| 20 | Finland | 3.5 | 2 | 17 | 22.5 |
| 21 | Belarus | 3.5 | 1.5 | 0.5 | 5.5 |
| 22 | Poland | 3 | 10.5 | 11 | 24.5 |
| 23 | Ireland | 3 | 2.5 | 3.5 | 9 |
| 24 | South Korea | 3 | 1 | 1 | 5 |
| 25 | Singapore | 3 | 0 | 8 | 11 |
| 26 | France | 2 | 6 | 11 | 19 |
| 27 | Norway | 2 | 2.5 | 12.5 | 17 |
| 28 | Switzerland | 2 | 1 | 6.5 | 9.5 |
| 29 | Sri Lanka | 1.5 | 6.5 | 4 | 12 |
| 30 | Hungary | 1 | 3.5 | 2 | 6.5 |
| 31 | Austria | 1 | 2.5 | 4 | 7.5 |
| 32 | Bulgaria | 1 | 2 | 7.5 | 10.5 |
| 33 | Ukraine | 1 | 1.5 | 2 | 4.5 |
| 34 | New Zealand | 1 | 1 | 1 | 3 |
| 35 | Portugal | 1 | 0 | 4 | 5 |
| 36 | China | 0.5 | 0 | 1.5 | 2 |
| 37 | Philippines | 0.5 | 0 | 0 | 0.5 |
| 38 | Australia | 0 | 2 | 4 | 6 |
| 39 | Romania | 0 | 1 | 2 | 3 |
| 40 | Belgium | 0 | 0.5 | 1 | 1.5 |
| 41 | Croatia | 0 | 0.5 | 0 | 0.5 |
| 42 | Czech Republic | 0 | 0 | 4 | 4 |
| 43 | Spain | 0 | 0 | 2 | 2 |
| 44 | Luxembourg | 0 | 0 | 1 | 1 |
| 44 | Macau | 0 | 0 | 1 | 1 |
| 44 | Uzbekistan | 0 | 0 | 1 | 1 |
| Totals (46 entries) | | 464 | 464 | 878 | 1,806 |

== Medal distribution ==
=== Men's singles ===
| Rank | Nation | Gold | Silver | Bronze | Total |
|---|---|---|---|---|---|
| 1 | Denmark | 15 | 14 | 23 | 52 |
| 2 | Chinese Taipei | 12 | 9 | 5 | 26 |
| 3 | Russia | 7 | 5 | 9 | 21 |
| 4 | Thailand | 7 | 5 | 7 | 19 |
| 5 | Indonesia | 6.5 | 2 | 4 | 12.5 |
| 6 | Japan | 5 | 10 | 9 | 24 |
| 7 | India | 5 | 5 | 18 | 28 |
| 8 | South Africa | 5 | 0 | 0 | 5 |
| 9 | Scotland | 4 | 2 | 1 | 7 |
| 10 | England | 3 | 6 | 13 | 22 |
| 11 | Germany | 3 | 3 | 15 | 21 |
| 12 | Malaysia | 3 | 0 | 9 | 12 |
| 13 | Finland | 2 | 1 | 7 | 10 |
| 14 | Norway | 2 | 0 | 6 | 8 |
| 15 | Sweden | 1 | 5 | 11 | 17 |
| 16 | Canada | 1 | 5 | 8 | 14 |
| 17 | Austria | 1 | 1 | 1 | 3 |
| 17 | New Zealand | 1 | 1 | 1 | 3 |
| 19 | Ukraine | 1 | 1 | 0 | 2 |
| 20 | France | 1 | 0 | 2 | 3 |
| 20 | Iceland | 1 | 0 | 2 | 3 |
| 22 | Singapore | 1 | 0 | 1 | 2 |
| 23 | Poland | 0 | 5 | 1 | 6 |
| 24 | Australia | 0 | 1 | 3 | 4 |
| 25 | Bulgaria | 0 | 1 | 2 | 3 |
| 26 | Hungary | 0 | 1 | 1 | 2 |
| 27 | Sri Lanka | 0 | 1 | 0 | 1 |
| 28 | Czech Republic | 0 | 0 | 3 | 3 |
| 28 | Switzerland | 0 | 0 | 3 | 3 |
| 30 | Portugal | 0 | 0 | 2 | 2 |
| 31 | Spain | 0 | 0 | 1 | 1 |
| Totals (31 entries) | | 87.5 | 84 | 168 | 339.5 |

=== Women's singles ===
| Rank | Nation | Gold | Silver | Bronze | Total |
|---|---|---|---|---|---|
| 1 | Germany | 23 | 16 | 22 | 61 |
| 2 | England | 11 | 14 | 27 | 52 |
| 3 | Denmark | 9 | 6 | 12 | 27 |
| 4 | Japan | 7 | 10 | 34 | 51 |
| 5 | Netherlands | 5 | 3 | 4 | 12 |
| 6 | Hong Kong | 4 | 1 | 0 | 5 |
| 6 | Israel | 4 | 1 | 0 | 5 |
| 8 | Russia | 3 | 3 | 1 | 7 |
| 9 | Canada | 2 | 3 | 8 | 13 |
| 10 | Poland | 2 | 1 | 5 | 8 |
| 11 | Belarus | 2 | 1 | 0 | 3 |
| 12 | United States | 2 | 0 | 0 | 2 |
| 13 | Scotland | 1 | 6 | 3 | 10 |
| 14 | Sri Lanka | 1 | 3 | 2 | 6 |
| 15 | Thailand | 1 | 3 | 0 | 4 |
| 16 | India | 1 | 2 | 9 | 12 |
| 17 | Sweden | 1 | 2 | 2 | 5 |
| 18 | Hungary | 1 | 2 | 1 | 4 |
| 19 | Chinese Taipei | 1 | 1 | 3 | 5 |
| 20 | Switzerland | 1 | 0 | 2 | 3 |
| 21 | Portugal | 1 | 0 | 0 | 1 |
| 22 | France | 0 | 3 | 3 | 6 |
| 23 | Bulgaria | 0 | 1 | 2 | 3 |
| 24 | Norway | 0 | 1 | 1 | 2 |
| 25 | Finland | 0 | 0 | 3 | 3 |
| 26 | Austria | 0 | 0 | 1 | 1 |
| 26 | Iceland | 0 | 0 | 1 | 1 |
| 26 | Indonesia | 0 | 0 | 1 | 1 |
| 26 | Ireland | 0 | 0 | 1 | 1 |
| 26 | Luxembourg | 0 | 0 | 1 | 1 |
| 26 | Ukraine | 0 | 0 | 1 | 1 |
| 26 | Uzbekistan | 0 | 0 | 1 | 1 |
| Totals (32 entries) | | 83 | 83 | 151 | 317 |

=== Men's doubles ===
| Rank | Nation | Gold | Silver | Bronze | Total |
|---|---|---|---|---|---|
| 1 | Thailand | 20 | 12.5 | 21.5 | 54 |
| 2 | England | 14 | 11 | 22 | 47 |
| 3 | Indonesia | 10.5 | 5.5 | 5.5 | 21.5 |
| 4 | Denmark | 10 | 16 | 26.5 | 52.5 |
| 5 | India | 5 | 9 | 11 | 25 |
| 6 | Japan | 4 | 7 | 10 | 21 |
| 7 | Sweden | 3.5 | 1 | 13 | 17.5 |
| 8 | Chinese Taipei | 3 | 5 | 4 | 12 |
| 9 | Malaysia | 3 | 4 | 9 | 16 |
| 10 | United States | 2.5 | 0 | 2 | 4.5 |
| 11 | Russia | 2 | 2 | 2 | 6 |
| 12 | Germany | 2 | 1 | 17 | 20 |
| 13 | Scotland | 1.5 | 1.5 | 3.5 | 6.5 |
| 14 | Canada | 1.5 | 1 | 1 | 3.5 |
| 15 | Netherlands | 1 | 1.5 | 2 | 4.5 |
| 16 | Finland | 1 | 1 | 2 | 4 |
| 17 | South Africa | 1 | 0 | 1 | 2 |
| 18 | Singapore | 0.5 | 0 | 1 | 1.5 |
| 19 | Philippines | 0.5 | 0 | 0 | 0.5 |
| 20 | Poland | 0 | 2 | 2 | 4 |
| 21 | Austria | 0 | 1.5 | 1.5 | 3 |
| 22 | Norway | 0 | 1 | 1.5 | 2.5 |
| 23 | Ireland | 0 | 1 | 0.5 | 1.5 |
| 24 | Croatia | 0 | 0.5 | 0 | 0.5 |
| 25 | Bulgaria | 0 | 0 | 2 | 2 |
| 25 | France | 0 | 0 | 2 | 2 |
| 25 | Romania | 0 | 0 | 2 | 2 |
| 28 | Australia | 0 | 0 | 1 | 1 |
| 28 | Spain | 0 | 0 | 1 | 1 |
| 28 | Switzerland | 0 | 0 | 1 | 1 |
| 31 | Sri Lanka | 0 | 0 | 0.5 | 0.5 |
| Totals (31 entries) | | 86.5 | 85 | 169 | 340.5 |

=== Women's doubles ===
| Rank | Nation | Gold | Silver | Bronze | Total |
|---|---|---|---|---|---|
| 1 | England | 18.5 | 23 | 29 | 70.5 |
| 2 | Japan | 17 | 17 | 35 | 69 |
| 3 | Denmark | 12.5 | 9.5 | 21.5 | 43.5 |
| 4 | Germany | 7.5 | 13 | 11 | 31.5 |
| 5 | Chinese Taipei | 4 | 3.5 | 3.5 | 11 |
| 6 | Netherlands | 3.5 | 2.5 | 3 | 9 |
| 7 | Iceland | 2.5 | 0 | 0 | 2.5 |
| 8 | Canada | 2 | 2 | 1.5 | 5.5 |
| 9 | Thailand | 2 | 1 | 4 | 7 |
| 10 | Ireland | 2 | 1 | 2 | 5 |
| 11 | South Korea | 2 | 1 | 1 | 4 |
| 12 | Scotland | 1.5 | 1.5 | 2.5 | 5.5 |
| 13 | Belarus | 1.5 | 0 | 0 | 1.5 |
| 13 | Israel | 1.5 | 0 | 0 | 1.5 |
| 15 | Russia | 1 | 2.5 | 2 | 5.5 |
| 16 | France | 1 | 0 | 2 | 3 |
| 17 | Bulgaria | 1 | 0 | 0 | 1 |
| 18 | Sweden | 0.5 | 2 | 8 | 10.5 |
| 19 | Sri Lanka | 0.5 | 0 | 0.5 | 1 |
| 20 | India | 0 | 1 | 6 | 7 |
| 21 | Norway | 0 | 0.5 | 1.5 | 2 |
| 22 | Hong Kong | 0 | 0.5 | 0.5 | 1 |
| 23 | Ukraine | 0 | 0.5 | 0 | 0.5 |
| 24 | Finland | 0 | 0 | 4 | 4 |
| 25 | Poland | 0 | 0 | 2 | 2 |
| 26 | United States | 0 | 0 | 1.5 | 1.5 |
| 27 | China | 0 | 0 | 1 | 1 |
| 28 | Indonesia | 0 | 0 | 0.5 | 0.5 |
| Totals (28 entries) | | 82 | 82 | 143.5 | 307.5 |

=== Mixed doubles ===
| Rank | Nation | Gold | Silver | Bronze | Total |
|---|---|---|---|---|---|
| 1 | England | 28 | 25 | 45.5 | 98.5 |
| 2 | Denmark | 13.5 | 13 | 29.5 | 56 |
| 3 | Germany | 10.5 | 11 | 18 | 39.5 |
| 4 | Chinese Taipei | 4.5 | 1 | 8 | 13.5 |
| 5 | Japan | 4 | 7 | 16 | 27 |
| 6 | Scotland | 4 | 5 | 1 | 10 |
| 7 | Indonesia | 4 | 0.5 | 1.5 | 6 |
| 8 | Netherlands | 3.5 | 1.5 | 1.5 | 6.5 |
| 9 | Sweden | 2.5 | 6.5 | 7.5 | 16.5 |
| 10 | Canada | 2 | 4 | 4 | 10 |
| 11 | Thailand | 2 | 4 | 3 | 9 |
| 12 | Russia | 2 | 0 | 2 | 4 |
| 13 | Switzerland | 1 | 0 | 0.5 | 1.5 |
| 14 | Hong Kong | 1 | 0 | 0 | 1 |
| 14 | Iceland | 1 | 0 | 0 | 1 |
| 14 | South Korea | 1 | 0 | 0 | 1 |
| 17 | China | 0.5 | 0 | 0.5 | 1 |
| 18 | Israel | 0.5 | 0 | 0 | 0.5 |
| 19 | India | 0 | 1 | 6 | 7 |
| 20 | Malaysia | 0 | 1 | 0.5 | 1.5 |
| 21 | France | 0 | 1 | 0 | 1 |
| 21 | Poland | 0 | 1 | 0 | 1 |
| 23 | Hungary | 0 | 0.5 | 1 | 1.5 |
| 24 | Belarus | 0 | 0.5 | 0.5 | 1 |
| 25 | Ireland | 0 | 0.5 | 0 | 0.5 |
| 25 | United States | 0 | 0.5 | 0 | 0.5 |
| 27 | Portugal | 0 | 0 | 2 | 2 |
| 28 | Bulgaria | 0 | 0 | 1.5 | 1.5 |
| 28 | Norway | 0 | 0 | 1.5 | 1.5 |
| 30 | Macau | 0 | 0 | 1 | 1 |
| 30 | Singapore | 0 | 0 | 1 | 1 |
| 30 | Sri Lanka | 0 | 0 | 1 | 1 |
| 30 | Ukraine | 0 | 0 | 1 | 1 |
| 34 | Austria | 0 | 0 | 0.5 | 0.5 |
| Totals (34 entries) | | 85.5 | 84.5 | 156 | 326 |

== See also ==
- BWF World Championships
- European Senior Badminton Championships
- World Veteran Badminton Championships (Since 1996) No BWF
