= 2003 IBF World Senior Championships =

Tournament details
- Dates: June 9, 2003 – June 15, 2003
- Edition: 1st
- Level: International
- Venue: Winter Sports Palace
- Location: Sofia, Bulgaria

The 2003 IBF World Senior Championships was a badminton tournament which held from 9 to 15 June at Winter Sports Palace in Sofia, Bulgaria.

== Medal summary ==
=== Medal table ===
* Host nation (Bulgaria)

Rank	Nation	Gold	Silver	Bronze	Total
1	Denmark	9	12.5	12	33.5
2	England	8	6	16.5	30.5
3	Germany	5	3	12	20
4	Russia	2	1.5	1.5	5
5	Belarus	1.5	0	0.5	2
6	Israel	1.5	0	0	1.5
7	Scotland	1	2	0	3
8	Bulgaria*	1	1	5	7
9	Austria	1	0	0	1
10	India	0	2	2	4
11	Sweden	0	1	2	3
12	Finland	0	1	0	1
13	Romania	0	0	1	1
14	Norway	0	0	0.5	0.5
Totals (14 entries)		30	30	53	113

=== Medalists ===
Event	Gold	Silver	Bronze
35+
Men's singles	(Denmark) Martin Kent	(Sweden) Magnus Gustafsson	(India) George Thomas
Men's singles	(Denmark) Martin Kent	(Sweden) Magnus Gustafsson	(England) Alistair Jones
Women's singles	(Belarus) Vlada Chernyavskaya	(England) Betty Blair	(Bulgaria) Petya Georgieva
Men's doubles	(England) Trevor Darlington (England) Paul Holden	(India) Bhushan Akut (India) George Thomas	(Bulgaria) Stefan Chorchopov (Germany) Holgen Wippich
Men's doubles	(England) Trevor Darlington (England) Paul Holden	(India) Bhushan Akut (India) George Thomas	(Romania) Vincent Dusnoki (Romania) Radu Ionescu
Women's doubles	(Belarus) Vlada Chernyavskaya (Bulgaria) Petya Georgieva	(Denmark) Nina Andersen (Denmark) Gitte Kruse	(Bulgaria) Pavlina Apolstolova (Bulgaria) Margarita Tosheva
Women's doubles	(Belarus) Vlada Chernyavskaya (Bulgaria) Petya Georgieva	(Denmark) Nina Andersen (Denmark) Gitte Kruse	(Bulgaria) Petya Argirova (Bulgaria) Boriana Stoynova
Mixed doubles	(England) Paul Holden (England) Betty Blair	(Denmark) Sigurd Hondrup (Denmark) Gitte Kruse	(Bulgaria) Ivan Dobrev (Belarus) Vlada Chernyavskaya
40+
Men's singles	(Russia) Oleg Okounev	(England) Eric Plane	(England) Jack Webb
Men's singles	(Russia) Oleg Okounev	(England) Eric Plane	(India) Milind Ghate
Women's singles	(Israel) Svetlana Zilberman	(Bulgaria) Diana Koleva	(Denmark) Lone Knudsen
Women's singles	(Israel) Svetlana Zilberman	(Bulgaria) Diana Koleva	(Denmark) Annette Vollertzen
Men's doubles	(England) Darrell Roebuck (England) Jack Webb	(India) Milind Ghate (India) Amod Tilak	(Bulgaria) Nanko Chorchopov (Bulgaria) Slantchezar Hristo
Men's doubles	(England) Darrell Roebuck (England) Jack Webb	(India) Milind Ghate (India) Amod Tilak	(England) Tim Hudson-Church (England) Eric Plane
Women's doubles	(Bulgaria) Diana Koleva (Israel) Svetlana Zilberman	(Denmark) Hanne Adsbol (Denmark) Annette Vollertzen	(England) Ann Jenkins (England) Linda Wood
Women's doubles	(Bulgaria) Diana Koleva (Israel) Svetlana Zilberman	(Denmark) Hanne Adsbol (Denmark) Annette Vollertzen	(England) Lynda Haley (England) Debbie Rigby
Mixed doubles	(Denmark) Steen Fladberg (Denmark) Annette Vollertzen	(Denmark) Morten Christensen (Denmark) Jeanette Koldsø	(England) Tim Hudson-Church (England) Debbie Rigby
Mixed doubles	(Denmark) Steen Fladberg (Denmark) Annette Vollertzen	(Denmark) Morten Christensen (Denmark) Jeanette Koldsø	(England) Eric Plane (England) Linda Wood
45+
Men's singles	(Austria) Tariq Farooq	(Russia) Vladmir Koloskov	(Sweden) Christer Forsgren
Men's singles	(Austria) Tariq Farooq	(Russia) Vladmir Koloskov	(England) John Machin
Women's singles	(Germany) Heidi Bender	(Scotland) Christine Black	(Germany) Marlies Wessels
Men's doubles	(Denmark) Claus Andersen (Denmark) Steen Fladberg	(Scotland) Leon Douglas (Scotland) Dan Travers	(England) Phil Howe (England) Roger Taylor
Men's doubles	(Denmark) Claus Andersen (Denmark) Steen Fladberg	(Scotland) Leon Douglas (Scotland) Dan Travers	(Denmark) Erik Linneberg (Denmark) Per Mikkelsen
Women's doubles	(England) Jackie Hurst (England) Andi Stretch	(England) Reggie Baker (England) Pamela Dallow	(Russia) Olga Braguinskaya (England) Sandra Ingham
Women's doubles	(England) Jackie Hurst (England) Andi Stretch	(England) Reggie Baker (England) Pamela Dallow	(Denmark) Debbie Lynch (Denmark) Hanne Nielsen
Mixed doubles	(Scotland) Dan Travers (Scotland) Christine Black	(England) Roger Taylor (England) Andi Stretch	(Denmark) Erik Linneberg (Denmark) Inge Ødum
Mixed doubles	(Scotland) Dan Travers (Scotland) Christine Black	(England) Roger Taylor (England) Andi Stretch	(England) Peter Emptage (England) Pamela Dallow
50+
Men's singles	(Denmark) Claus Andersen	(Denmark) Per Mikkelsen	(Sweden) Sören Mohlin
Men's singles	(Denmark) Claus Andersen	(Denmark) Per Mikkelsen	(Germany) Edgar Michalowsky
Women's singles	(Denmark) Lis Rathsach	(England) Sue Whittaker	(England) Betty Bartlett
Men's doubles	(Germany) Edgar Michalowsky (Germany) Erfried Michalowsky	(England) John Cocker (England) Bill Hamblett	(England) Peter Emptage (England) John Gardner
Men's doubles	(Germany) Edgar Michalowsky (Germany) Erfried Michalowsky	(England) John Cocker (England) Bill Hamblett	(Germany) Günter Prenzel (Germany) Bernd Wessels
Women's doubles	(Denmark) Inge Ødum (Denmark) Lis Rathsach	(Denmark) Lis Garhøj (Denmark) Helle Guldborg	(Norway) Bodil Bugge (Germany) Helga Peeck
Women's doubles	(Denmark) Inge Ødum (Denmark) Lis Rathsach	(Denmark) Lis Garhøj (Denmark) Helle Guldborg	(England) Marguerite Butt (England) Sue Whittaker
Mixed doubles	(England) John Cocker (England) Betty Bartlett	(Germany) Erfried Michalowsky (Germany) Angela Michalowsky	(Denmark) Claus Andersen (Denmark) Lis Rathsach
Mixed doubles	(England) John Cocker (England) Betty Bartlett	(Germany) Erfried Michalowsky (Germany) Angela Michalowsky	(Denmark) Søren Haldager (Denmark) Helle Guldborg
55+
Men's singles	(England) Dave Eddy	(Denmark) John Kirkebye	(Denmark) René Toft
Men's singles	(England) Dave Eddy	(Denmark) John Kirkebye	(Germany) Peter Gerth
Women's singles	(Russia) Lyudmila Ukk	(Germany) Renate Knötzsch	(Denmark) Inge May Hansen
Women's singles	(Russia) Lyudmila Ukk	(Germany) Renate Knötzsch	(Germany) Traudl Remmele
Men's doubles	(Denmark) John Kirkebye (Denmark) René Toft	(Finland) Kari Låkso (Finland) Stefan Packalen	(Germany) Karl Füssl (Germany) Trevor Stewart
Women's doubles	(Germany) Heidi Menacher (Germany) Traudl Remmele	(Denmark) Inge Nielsen (Russia) Lyudmila Ukk	(Germany) Renate Gabriel (Germany) Renate Knötsch
Mixed doubles	(Denmark) Søren Nielsen (Denmark) Inge May Hansen	(Denmark) René Toft (Denmark) Irene Sterlie	(Denmark) Gert Lasarotti (Denmark) Inge Nielsen
Mixed doubles	(Denmark) Søren Nielsen (Denmark) Inge May Hansen	(Denmark) René Toft (Denmark) Irene Sterlie	(Germany) Trevor Stewart (Germany) Elisabeth Stewart
60+
Men's singles	(Germany) Hans Schumacher	(Denmark) Bendt Rose	(England) Harry Shadwick
Men's singles	(Germany) Hans Schumacher	(Denmark) Bendt Rose	(Denmark) Leif V. Hansen
Women's singles	(Germany) Renate Gabriel	(Denmark) Solveig Bjørløw	(Germany) Heidi Menacher
Women's singles	(Germany) Renate Gabriel	(Denmark) Solveig Bjørløw	(England) Beryl Goddall
Men's doubles	(Denmark) Leif V. Hansen (Denmark) Bendt Rose	(Denmark) Lars Kure (Denmark) Søren Nielsen	(England) Michael Coley (England) Harry Shadwick
Men's doubles	(Denmark) Leif V. Hansen (Denmark) Bendt Rose	(Denmark) Lars Kure (Denmark) Søren Nielsen	(Germany) Seigfried Dutschke (Germany) Gerhard Grönbold
Women's doubles	(England) Brenda Andrew (England) Beryl Goodall	(Denmark) Solveig Bjørløw (Denmark) Birgit Ortmann	(Russia) Liudmila Chrikova (Russia) Galina Valeeva
Mixed doubles	(England) Harry Shadwick (England) Brenda Andrew	(Germany) Hans Schumacher (Germany) Renate Gabriel	(Denmark) Leif V. Hansen (Denmark) Solveig Bjørløw
Mixed doubles	(England) Harry Shadwick (England) Brenda Andrew	(Germany) Hans Schumacher (Germany) Renate Gabriel	(Germany) Gerhard Grönbold (Germany) Heidi Menacher
