= Daniel Graßmück =

Austrian badminton player (born 1987)

Personal information
- Born: 8 January 1987 (age 39)
- Height: 1.81 m (5 ft 11 in)

Sport
- Country: Austria
- Sport: Badminton

Men’s singles & doubles
- Highest ranking: 124 (MS 9 December 2010); 67 (MD 2 September 2010)
- BWF profile

Daniel Graßmück (born 8 January 1987) is an Austrian badminton player.

== Achievements ==
=== BWF International Challenge/Series ===
Men's doubles
Year	Tournament	Partner	Opponent	Score	Result
2009	Slovenian International	(Austria) Roman Zirnwald	(Austria) Jurgen Koch (Austria) Peter Zauner	18–21, 14–21	(silver) Runner-up
2017	Peru International Series	(Austria) Luka Wraber	(Austria) Dominik Stipsits (Austria) Roman Zirnwald	14–21, 21–15, 21–15	(gold) Winner
2018	Mauritius International	(Austria) Roman Zirnwald	(Malaysia) Ng Yong Chai (Malaysia) Tee Kai Wun	21–16, 12–21, 14–21	(gold) Winner

BWF International Challenge tournament
BWF International Series tournament
BWF Future Series tournament
