= Leopold Bauer =

Austrian-Silesian architect

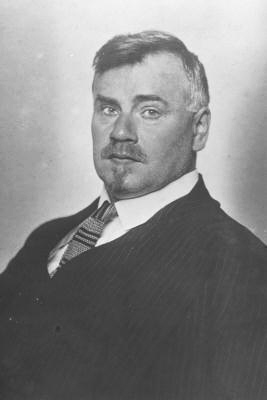
- Leopold Bauer in 1920
- Born: 1 September 1872; Krnov, Austria-Hungary
- Died: 7 October 1938 (aged 66); Vienna, Austria
- Occupation: Architect

Leopold Bauer (1 September 1872 – 7 October 1938) was an Austrian-Silesian architect. His work was part of the architecture event in the art competition at the 1936 Summer Olympics.

== Work ==
The Petr Bezruč City House of Culture in Opava, which is protected as a national cultural monument of the Czech Republic, belongs to the most valuable works of Leopold Bauer. It was built in the Neo-Renaissance style in 1908–1910.
