= European Senior Badminton Championships =

International sporting tournament

The European Senior Badminton Championships is a tournament organized by the Badminton Europe (BE) since 1995 and is held once every two years to crown the best Veteran badminton players in Europe.

== Championships ==
Number	Year	Host city	Host country	Events
1	1995	Hillerød	Denmark	15
2	1997	Gateshead	England	20
3	1999	Innsbruck	Austria	19
4	2001	Sofia	Bulgaria	24
5	2002	Radebeul	Denmark	24
6	2004	Almunécar	Spain	25
7	2006	Amersfoort	Netherlands	30
8	2008	Punta Umbria	Spain	30
9	2010	Dundalk	Ireland	30
10	2012	Sofia	Bulgaria	36
11	2014	Caldas da Rainha	Portugal	40
12	2016	Podcetrtek	Slovenia	40
13	2018	Guadalajara	Spain	40
14	2022	Ljubljana	Slovenia	43
15	2024	Heusden-Zolder	Belgium	47

== Medal count (1995 - 2014) ==
Rank	Nation	Gold	Silver	Bronze	Total
1	England (ENG)	88	102	178.5	368.5
2	Denmark (DEN)	66.5	65	131	262.5
3	Germany (GER)	50	61.5	130	241.5
4	Scotland (SCO)	14.5	7.5	14	36
5	Sweden (SWE)	9	6.5	42	57.5
6	Russia (RUS)	8	10	11	29
7	Israel (ISR)	8	0.5	0	8.5
8	Poland (POL)	5.5	5	5	15.5
9	Belarus (BLR)	4	0.5	1	5.5
10	Netherlands (NED)	3.5	5	11.5	20
11	Bulgaria (BUL)	3.5	5	3	11.5
12	Norway (NOR)	3	5.5	5	13.5
13	Switzerland (SUI)	3	0	2.5	5.5
14	Hungary (HUN)	3	0	0	3
15	Ukraine (UKR)	2	1	2	5
16	Finland (FIN)	2	0	7.5	9.5
17	Austria (AUT)	1	5	5.5	11.5
18	France (FRA)	1	3	8.5	12.5
19	Spain (ESP)	1	2	0	3
20	Ireland (IRL)	1	1	1	3
21	Slovenia (SLO)	1	0	1	2
22	Portugal (POR)	1	0	0	1
23	Iceland (ISL)	0	1	0	1
24	Czech Republic (CZE)	0	0	2	2
24	Italy (ITA)	0	0	2	2
Totals (25 entries)		279.5	287	564	1,130.5

== See also ==
- BWF World Senior Championships
- European Para-Badminton Championships
- Asian Senior Badminton Championships
