= Fiji national badminton team =

National badminton team representing Fiji

Fiji
- Association: Fiji Badminton Association (FBA)
- Confederation: BO (Oceania)
- President: Barry Whiteside

BWF ranking
- Current ranking: 129 ▼2 (2 January 2024)
- Highest ranking: 45 (6 July 2017)

Sudirman Cup
- Appearances: 1 (first in 2017)
- Best result: Group stage

Oceania Mixed Team Championships
- Appearances: 5 (first in 2002)
- Best result: Third place (2002, 2006, 2010)

Oceania Men's Team Championships
- Appearances: 2 (first in 2018)
- Best result: Fourth place (2018)

Oceania Women's Team Championships
- Appearances: 1 (first in 2018)
- Best result: Third place (2018)

The Fiji national badminton team (Fijian: Timi ni dautaqani ni matanitu o Viti) represents Fiji in international badminton team competitions. It is administered by the Fiji Badminton Association. Fiji competed in the 2017 Sudirman Cup, where it finished in 25th place.

The Fijian mixed team won bronze three times in the Oceania Badminton Championships. The women's team also won bronze in the 2018 Oceania Badminton Championships.

== Participation in BWF competitions ==
Sudirman Cup

Year	Result
(Australia) 2017	25th - Group 3

== Participation in Oceania Badminton Championships ==
Men's team
Year	Result
2018	Fourth place
2020	5th place
2024	5th place

Women's team
Year	Result
2018	(bronze) Third place

Mixed team
Year	Result
2002	(bronze) Third place
2006	(bronze) Third place
2010	(bronze) Third place
2019	5th place
2025	4th place

== Junior competitive record ==
=== Oceania Junior Team Championships ===
==== Mixed team ====
Year	Round	Pos
2011	Did not enter	
2013	Did not enter	
2015	Did not enter	
2017	Did not enter	
2019		
2023	Did not enter	
2025	Group stage	6th

**Red border color indicates tournament was held on home soil.

== Players ==
=== Current squad ===
As of 2 January 2024

==== Men's team ====
Name	DoB/Age	Ranking of event		
Name	DoB/Age	MS	MD	XD
Liam Fong	23 December 1999 (age 26)	1057	-	-
Martin Feussner	25 August 1995 (age 30)	-	-	-
Chang Ho Kim	28 April 2001 (age 24)	-	-	-
Jared Chung	28 July 2004 (age 21)	-	-	-
Robert Loo	13 December 2000 (age 25)	-	-	-

==== Women's team ====
Name	DoB/Age	Ranking of event		
Name	DoB/Age	WS	WD	XD
Sristi Nadan	4 March 2000 (age 25)	-	-	-
Ashley Yee	11 May 2000 (age 25)	-	-	-
Sina Quai Hoi	28 February 1996 (age 29)	-	-	-
Carmen Loo	8 October 1999 (age 26)	-	-	-
Monica Chan	30 June 2001 (age 24)	-	-	-
