= Dominik Stipsits =

Austrian badminton player (born 1994)

Personal information
- Born: 1 September 1994 (age 32) Korneuburg, Austria
- Height: 1.85 m (6 ft 1 in)

Sport
- Country: Austria
- Sport: Badminton
- Handedness: Right

Men's & mixed doubles
- Highest ranking: 58 (MD with Roman Zirnwald, 7 September 2017); 105 (XD with Antonia Meinke, 3 May 2018)
- BWF profile

Dominik Stipsits (born 1 September 1994) is an Austrian badminton player. Stipsits was born in Korneuburg, and spent his childhood in Stammersdorf, Vienna. He started to playing badminton in 2002, and selected to join the national team in 2013. As a junior player, he competed at the 2012 BWF World Junior Championships and 2013 European Junior Badminton Championships. In 2017, he competed at the World Championships reach in to the second round. He won his first senior international title at the 2017 Bulgarian International tournament in the mixed doubles event partnered with Antonia Meinke.

== Achievements ==
=== BWF International Challenge/Series ===
Men's doubles
Year	Tournament	Partner	Opponent	Score	Result
2017	Peru International Series	(Austria) Roman Zirnwald	(Austria) Daniel Graßmück (Austria) Luka Wraber	21–14, 15–21, 15–21	(silver) Runner-up
2018	Croatian International	(Austria) Philip Birker	(Germany) Peter Lang (Germany) Thomas Legleitner	14–21, 11–21	(silver) Runner-up
2018	Slovenian International	(Austria) Philip Birker	(Denmark) Oliver Gram (Denmark) Mads Thøgersen	18–21, 19–21	(silver) Runner-up
2019	Bulgarian International	(Austria) Philip Birker	(Finland) Anton Monnberg (Finland) Jesper Paul	21–19, 14–21, 23–21	(gold) Winner

Mixed doubles
Year	Tournament	Partner	Opponent	Score	Result
2017	Bulgarian International	(Austria) Antonia Meinke	(India) Sanyam Shukla (India) Ahillya Harjani	21–16, 21–5	(gold) Winner

BWF International Challenge tournament
BWF International Series tournament
BWF Future Series tournament
