= Simone Prutsch =

Austrian badminton player (born 1978)

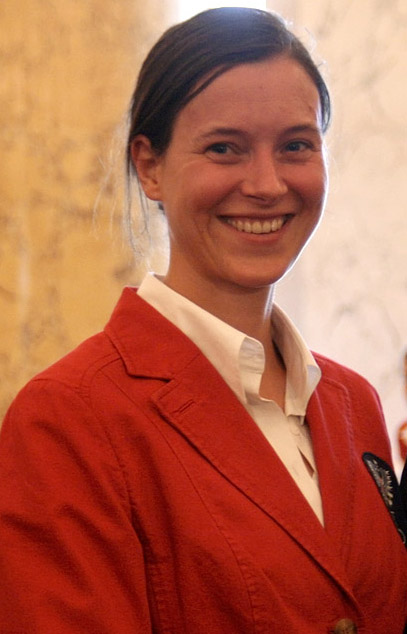
- Prutsch at Olympic Games 2012

Personal information
- Born: 17 October 1978 (age 48) Bad Cannstatt, Stuttgart, Germany
- Height: 1.78 m (5 ft 10 in)
- Weight: 66 kg (146 lb)

Sport
- Country: Austria
- Sport: Badminton
- Event: Women's singles

Simone Prutsch (born 17 October 1978) is an Austrian badminton player. She competed for Austria at the 2012 Summer Olympics.

== Achievements ==
=== BWF International Challenge/Series ===
Women's singles
Year	Tournament	Opponent	Score	Result
2004	Brazil International	(Canada) Sarah MacMaster		(gold) Winner
2006	Banu Sport International	(Bulgaria) Petya Nedelcheva	12–21, 11–21	(silver) Runner-up

Women’s doubles
Year	Tournament	Partner	Opponent	Score	Result
2002	Italian International	(Austria) Verena Fastenbauer	(Portugal) Telma Santos (Portugal) Vânia Leça	11–7, 11–3	(gold) Winner
