= Jürgen Koch =

Austrian badminton player

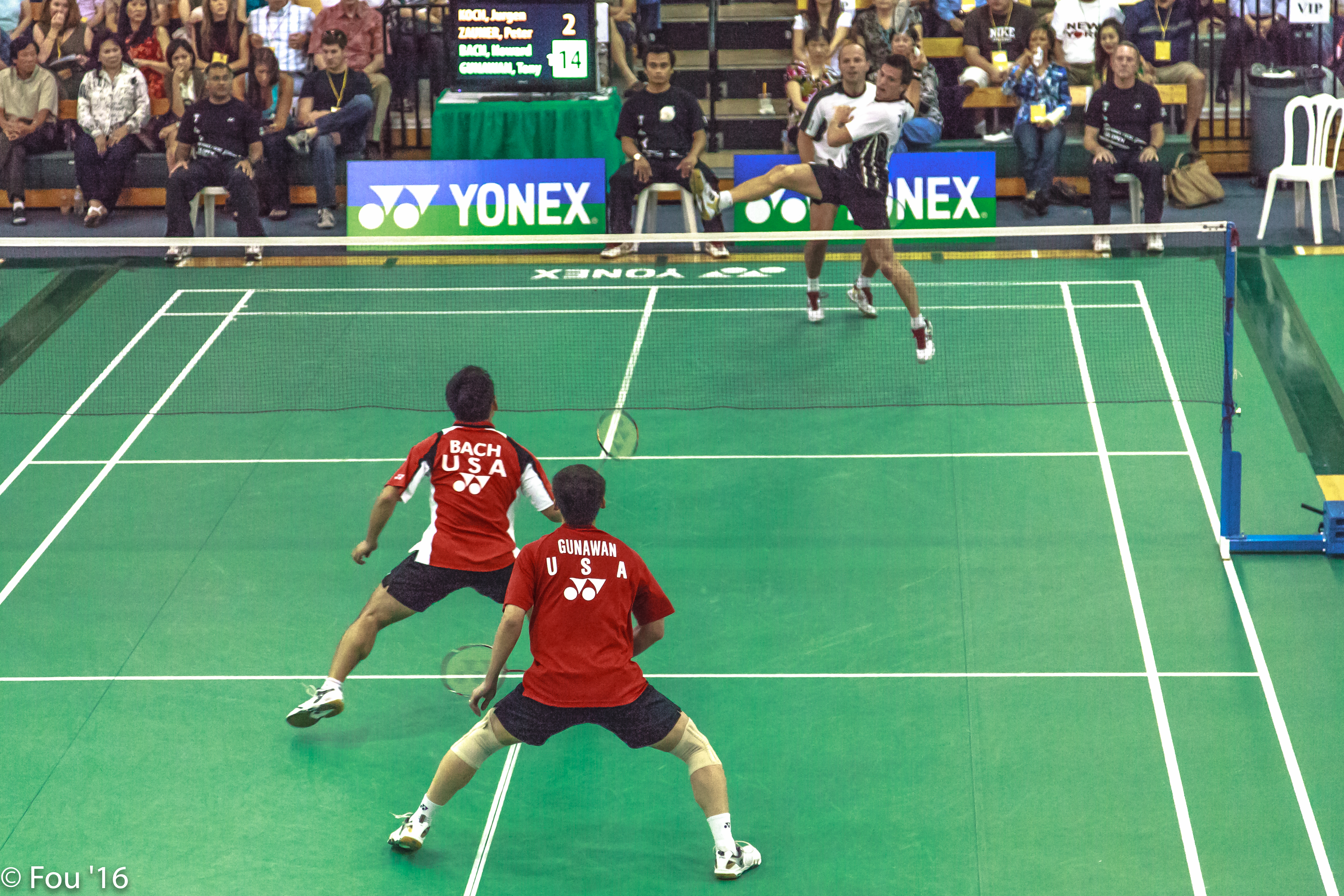

Personal information
- Born: 8 January 1973 (age 53) Traun, Austria
- Height: 1.71 m (5 ft 7 in)
- Weight: 69 kg (152 lb)

Sport
- Country: Austria
- Sport: Badminton
- Handedness: Right

Men's singles & doubles
- Highest ranking: 29 (MS) (21 January 2010)
- BWF profile
Medal record
Men's badminton
Representing Austria
European Junior Championships
| Gold medal – first place | 1991 Budapest | Boys' singles |

Jürgen Koch (born 8 January 1973) is an Austrian badminton player from Askö Traun badminton club.

== Career ==
Koch competed in badminton at the 1992 Summer Olympics in men's singles. He lost in the second round to Wong Wai Lap, of Hong Kong, 17-18, 15-6, 15-3. Koch played the 2007 BWF World Championships in men's singles, and was defeated in the first round by Anup Sridhar, of India, 21-15, 21-19. He won more than 20 titles at the Austrian National Badminton Championships.
