= May 2010 in sports =

<<	May 2010					>>
Su	Mo	Tu	We	Th	Fr	Sa
						1
2	3	4	5	6	7	8
9	10	11	12	13	14	15
16	17	18	19	20	21	22
23	24	25	26	27	28	29
30	31
Sports

This list shows notable sports-related deaths, events, and notable outcomes that occurred in May of 2010.

== Deaths in May ==
- 3: Florencio Campomanes
- 4: Ernie Harwell
- 6: Robin Roberts
- 12: Charlie Francis

== Current sporting seasons ==
=== Australian rules football 2010 ===
- Australian Football League

=== Auto racing 2010 ===
- Formula One
- Sprint Cup
- IRL IndyCar Series
- World Rally Championship
- Formula Two
- Nationwide Series
- Camping World Truck Series
- GP2 Series
- GP3 Series
- WTTC
- V8 Supercar
- American Le Mans
- Le Mans Series
- Superleague Formula
- Rolex Sports Car Series
- FIA GT1 World Championship
- Formula Three
- Auto GP
- World Series by Renault
- Deutsche Tourenwagen Masters
- Super GT

=== Baseball 2010 ===
- Major League Baseball
- Nippon Professional Baseball

=== Basketball 2010 ===
- NBA
- WNBA
- France
- Germany
- Greece
- Italy
- Philippines
  - Fiesta Conference
- Turkey

=== Cricket 2009–2010 ===
- Bangladesh:
  - National League
- England:
  - County Championship
- India:
  - Ranji Trophy
- New Zealand:
  - Plunket Shield
- Pakistan:
  - Quaid-i-Azam Trophy
- South Africa:
  - SuperSport Series
- Sri Lanka:
  - Premier Trophy
- Zimbabwe:
  - Logan Cup

=== Association football 2010 ===
National teams competitions

- 2011 FIFA Women's World Cup qualification (UEFA)
- 2011 UEFA European Under-21 Championship qualification

International clubs competitions

- Copa Libertadores (South America)
- AFC (Asia) Champions League
- AFC Cup
- CAF (Africa) Champions League
- CAF Confederation Cup

Domestic (national) competitions

- Brazil
- Iran
- Japan
- Norway
- Russia
- Major League Soccer (USA & Canada)
- Women's Professional Soccer (USA)

=== Golf 2010 ===
- PGA Tour
- European Tour
- LPGA Tour
- Champions Tour

=== Ice hockey 2010 ===
- National Hockey League

=== Motorcycle racing 2010 ===
- Moto GP
- Superbike World Championship
- Supersport racing

=== Rugby league 2010 ===
- Super League
- NRL

=== Rugby union 2010 ===
- 2011 Rugby World Cup qualifying

== Days of the month ==
=== May 31, 2010 (Monday) ===
==== Basketball ====
- (Ukraine) Ukrainian SuperLeague Final (best-of-5 series):
  - Game 5: Budivelnyk Kyiv 70–77 Azovmash Mariupol. **Azovmash Mariupol win series 3–2.**
    - Azovmash Mariupol win the championship for the fifth consecutive time and seventh time overall.

==== Cricket ====
- Bangladesh in England:
  - 1st Test in London, day 5:
    - England 505 (125 overs) and 163/2 (35.1 overs); Bangladesh 282 (93 overs) and 382 (f/o, 110.2 overs). **England win by 8 wickets, lead the 2-match series 1–0.**

==== Ice hockey ====
- Stanley Cup Finals (best-of-7 series):
  - Game 2: Chicago Blackhawks 2, Philadelphia Flyers 1. Blackhawks lead series 2–0.

==== Motorcycle racing ====
- Superbike:
  - Miller Superbike World Championship round in Tooele, United States:
    - Race 1: (1) Max Biaggi (ITA) (Aprilia RSV 4) (2) Leon Haslam (GBR) (Suzuki GSX-R1000) (3) Noriyuki Haga (JPN) (Ducati 1098R)
    - Race 2: (1) Biaggi (2) Leon Camier (GBR) (Aprilia RSV 4) (3) Cal Crutchlow (GBR) (Yamaha YZF-R1)
      - Riders' championship standings (after 7 of 13 rounds): (1) Biaggi 257 points (2) Haslam 242 (3) Jonathan Rea (GBR) (Honda CBR1000RR) 151
      - Manufacturers' championship standings: (1) Aprilia 263 points (2) Suzuki 252 (3) Ducati 214
- Supersport:
  - Miller Supersport World Championship round in Tooele, United States:
    - (1) Kenan Sofuoğlu (TUR) (Honda CBR600RR) (2) Eugene Laverty (IRL) (Honda CBR600RR) (3) Joan Lascorz (ESP) (Kawasaki Ninja ZX-6R)
      - Riders' championship standings (after 7 of 13 rounds): (1) Sofuoğlu 142 points (2) Laverty 136 (3) Lascorz 128
      - Manufacturers' championship standings: (1) Honda 170 points (2) Kawasaki 128 (3) Triumph 94
      - Sofuoğlu achieves a hat-trick, as he won the race from pole position as well as setting the fastest lap.

==== Tennis ====
- Grand Slams:
  - French Open in Paris, France:
    - Men's singles, fourth round:
      - **Rafael Nadal** (ESP) [2] def. Thomaz Bellucci (BRA) [24] 6–2, 7–5, 6–4
      - **Novak Djokovic** (SRB) [3] def. Robby Ginepri (USA) 6–4, 2–6, 6–1, 6–2
      - **Nicolás Almagro** (ESP) [19] def. Fernando Verdasco (ESP) [7] 6–1, 4–6, 6–1, 6–4
      - **Jürgen Melzer** (AUT) [22] def. Teymuraz Gabashvili (RUS) 7–6(6), 4–6, 6–1, 6–4
    - Women's singles, fourth round:
      - **Serena Williams** (USA) [1] def. Shahar Pe'er (ISR) [18] 6–2, 6–2
      - **Jelena Janković** (SRB) [4] def. Daniela Hantuchová (SVK) [23] 6–4, 6–2
      - **Samantha Stosur** (AUS) [7] def. Justine Henin (BEL) [22] 2–6, 6–1, 6–4
      - **Yaroslava Shvedova** (KAZ) def. Jarmila Groth (AUS) [WC] 6–4, 6–3

=== May 30, 2010 (Sunday) ===
==== Auto racing ====
- Formula One:
  - Turkish Grand Prix in Istanbul, Turkey:
    - (1) Lewis Hamilton (GBR) (McLaren–Mercedes) (2) Jenson Button (GBR) (McLaren-Mercedes) (3) Mark Webber (AUS) (Red Bull–Renault)
      - Drivers' championship standings (after 7 of 19 races): (1) Webber 93 points (2) Button 88 (3) Hamilton 84
      - Constructors' championship standings: (1) McLaren 172 points (2) Red Bull 171 (3) Ferrari 146
- NASCAR Sprint Cup Series:
  - Coca-Cola 600 in Concord, North Carolina:
    - (1) (Nevada) Kurt Busch (Dodge, Penske Racing) (2) (Missouri) Jamie McMurray (Chevrolet, Earnhardt Ganassi Racing) (3) (Nevada) Kyle Busch (Toyota, Joe Gibbs Racing)
      - Drivers' championship standings (after 13 of 36 races): (1) (California) Kevin Harvick (Chevrolet, Richard Childress Racing) 1898 points (2) Kyle Busch 1869 (3) (Wisconsin) Matt Kenseth (Ford, Roush Fenway Racing) 1781
- IndyCar Series:
  - Indianapolis 500 in Speedway, Indiana:
    - (1) Dario Franchitti (GBR) (Chip Ganassi Racing) (2) Dan Wheldon (GBR) (Panther Racing) (3) Marco Andretti (USA) (Andretti Autosport)
      - Drivers' championship standings (after 6 of 17 races): (1) Will Power (AUS) (Team Penske) 227 points (2) Franchitti 216 (3) Scott Dixon (NZL) (Chip Ganassi Racing) 203
      - Owner Chip Ganassi becomes the first owner to win both the Daytona 500 and the Indianapolis 500 in the same season, with Franchitti becoming the 17th driver to win multiple Indy 500s.
- World Rally Championship:
  - Rally de Portugal in Vilamoura:
    - (1) Sébastien Ogier (FRA) / Julien Ingrassia (FRA) (Citroën C4 WRC) (2) Sébastien Loeb (FRA) / Daniel Elena (MON) (Citroën C4 WRC) (3) Dani Sordo (ESP) / Marc Martí (ESP) (Citroën C4 WRC)
      - Drivers' championship standings (after 6 of 13 rounds): (1) Loeb 126 points (2) Ogier 88 (3) Mikko Hirvonen (FIN) (Ford Focus RS WRC 09) 76

==== Basketball ====
- FIBA Asia Champions Cup in Doha, Qatar:
  - Bronze Medal Match: ASU (Jordan) 78–82 (OT) (Lebanon) (bronze) Al-Riyadi Beirut
  - Gold Medal Match: (silver) Al-Rayyan (Qatar) 73–93 (gold) (Iran) **Mahram Tehran**
    - Mahram Tehran win the Cup for the second successive year.
- (Turkey) Turkish Basketball League Finals (best-of-7 series):
  - Game 5: Efes Pilsen 83–79 Fenerbahçe Ülker. Fenerbahçe Ülker lead series 3–2.
- (Greece) A1 Ethniki Final (best-of-5 series):
  - Game 2: Olympiacos 79–72 Panathinaikos. Series tied 1–1.
- (Austria) Österreichische Basketball Bundesliga Final (best-of-5 series):
  - Game 5: Fürstenfeld 68–76 Gmunden. **Gmunden win series 3–2.**
    - Gmunden win the championship for the fifth time in six seasons.
- (Brazil) Novo Basquete Brasil Finals (best-of-5 series):
  - Game 3: Universo/BRB 85–84 Flamengo. Universo lead series 2–1.

==== Cricket ====
- Bangladesh in England:
  - 1st Test in London, day 4:
    - England 505 (125 overs); Bangladesh 282 (93 overs) and 328/5 (f/o, 85 overs; Tamim Iqbal 103). Bangladesh lead by 105 runs with 5 wickets remaining.
- South Africa in West Indies:
  - 4th ODI in Roseau, Dominica:
    - West Indies 303/6 (50 overs); South Africa 304/3 (50 overs; Hashim Amla 129). **South Africa win by 7 wickets; lead 5-match series 4–0.**
- Tri-nation series in Zimbabwe:
  - Group stage:
    - Sri Lanka 242 (49.5 overs); India 243/3 (43.3 overs, Rohit Sharma 101*) in Bulawayo. **India win by 7 wickets.**
      - Standings: Zimbabwe 4 points (1 match), India 4 (2), Sri Lanka 0 (1).

==== Cycling ====
- Grand Tours:
  - Giro d'Italia:
    - Stage 21: (gold) Gustav Larsson (SWE) (Team Saxo Bank) 20' 19" (silver) Marco Pinotti (ITA) (Team HTC–Columbia) + 2" (bronze) Alexander Vinokourov (KAZ) (Astana) + 17"
      - Final general classification: (1) Ivan Basso (ITA) (Liquigas–Doimo) 87h 44' 01" (2) David Arroyo (ESP) (Caisse d'Epargne) + 1' 51" (3) Vincenzo Nibali (ITA) (Liquigas–Doimo) + 2' 37"
        - Basso wins his second Giro d'Italia, having previously won in 2006.

==== Equestrianism ====
- Show jumping:
  - FEI Nations Cup Promotional League:
    - FEI Nations Cup of Portugal in Lisbon (CSIO 4*): (gold) Netherlands (Henk van de Pol on Abeltje Z, Aniek Poels on Asteria, Marlies van Soest on Rodos, Peter Bulthuis on Cashmir) (silver) United Kingdom (Charlotte Platt on Ulien, William Funnell on Billy Congo, Robert Bevis on Courtney, Tim Stockdale on Kalico Bay) (bronze) Italy (Andrea Herholdt on Viko, Daniele Augusto da Rios on Ultimate, Francesca Capponi on Stallone, Luca Moneta on Jesus de la Commune)
      - Standings (after 5 of 11 competitions): (1) Italy 34 points (2) Belgium 33 (3) Australia 25
  - Grand Prix Loro Piana, Rome (CSIO 5*): (gold) McLain Ward (USA) on Sapphire (silver) John Whitaker (GBR) on Peppermill (bronze) Rodrigo Pessoa (BRA) on Rebozo

==== Football (soccer) ====
- AFC Women's Asian Cup in Chengdu, China:
  - Third place playoff: (bronze) Japan 2–0 China
  - Final: (gold) **Australia** 1–1 (5–4 pen.) (silver) North Korea
    - Australia win the Cup for the first time.
- European Under-17 Championship in Liechtenstein:
  - Final: **England** 2–1 Spain
    - England win the Championship for the first time.
- UEFA Women's Under-19 Championship in Macedonia: (teams in **bold** advance to semi-finals)
  - Group A:
    - Italy 3–3 Scotland
    - **England** 1–2 **Germany**
      - Final standings: Germany 9 points, England 6, Italy, Scotland 1.
  - Group B:
    - **France** 6–1 North Macedonia
    - Spain 0–2 **Netherlands**
      - Final standings: Netherlands 9 points, France 6, Spain 3, Macedonia 0.
- 2011 UEFA European Under-21 Championship qualification:
  - Group 2: Georgia 0–0 Switzerland
    - Standings: Switzerland 17 points (9 matches), Turkey 13 (8), Estonia 12 (9), Armenia 10 (8), Georgia 9 (7), Republic of Ireland 4 (7)
- Luxembourg Cup Final in Luxembourg city:
  - Grevenmacher 0–1 **Differdange 03**
    - FC Differdange 03 win the Cup for the first time.
- (Moldova) Moldovan Cup Final in Chişinău:
  - Dacia 0–2 **Sheriff**
    - Sheriff win the Cup for the seventh time.

==== Futsal ====
- AFC Championship in Tashkent, Uzbekistan:
  - Third place play-off: China 1–6 (bronze) Japan
  - Final: (silver) Uzbekistan 3–8 (gold) **Iran**
    - Iran win the Championship for the 10th time.

==== Golf ====
- Senior majors:
  - Senior PGA Championship in Parker, Colorado, United States:
    - (1) **Tom Lehman** (USA) 281 (−7)^{PO} (T2) Fred Couples (USA), David Frost (ZAF) 281
      - Lehman pars the first playoff hole to collect his first senior major win and second Champions Tour title.
- PGA Tour:
  - Crowne Plaza Invitational at Colonial in Fort Worth, Texas:
    - Winner: Zach Johnson (USA) 259 (−21)
      - Johnson picks up his seventh PGA Tour win and sets a new course record.
- European Tour:
  - Madrid Masters in Spain:
    - Winner: Luke Donald (ENG) 267 (−21)
      - Donald wins his first European Tour title since 2004 and the third of his career.
- LPGA Tour:
  - HSBC LPGA Brasil Cup in Brazil:
    - Winner: Meaghan Francella (USA) 140 (−6)
      - In this unofficial event, Francella wins her third professional title.

==== Handball ====
- EHF Champions League Final Four in Cologne, Germany:
  - 3/4 Match: Chekhovskiye Medvedi (Russia) 28–36 (Spain) (bronze) BM Ciudad Real
  - Final: (silver) FC Barcelona (Spain) 34–36 (gold) (Germany) **THW Kiel**
    - Kiel win the Champions League for the second time.

==== Rugby union ====
- IRB Junior World Trophy in Moscow, Russia:
  - 7th place play-off: Papua New Guinea 22–46 Zimbabwe
  - 5th place play-off: Uruguay 13–11 Canada
  - 3rd place play-off: Romania 20–23 (aet) (bronze) Russia
  - Final: (gold) **Italy** 36–7 (silver) Japan
    - Italy win the Trophy for the first time.
- IRB Sevens World Series:
  - Scotland Sevens in Edinburgh:
    - Shield: Canada 7–26 **Russia**
    - Bowl: **Wales** 26–10 Kenya
    - Plate: **Scotland** 19–0 Argentina
    - Cup: **Samoa** 41–14 Australia
      - Final series standings: (1) Samoa 164 points (2) New Zealand 149 (3) Australia 122
      - Samoa win the series for the first time.
      - The first 2010 IRB Award is handed out, with Samoa's Mikaele Pesamino named as International Sevens Player of the Year.
- Mid-year Tests:
  - England 35–26 Barbarians in London

==== Table tennis ====
- World Team Championships in Moscow, Russia:
  - Men's final: **China** 3–1 Germany
    - China win the title for the fifth successive time and 18th overall.
  - Women's final: China 1–3 **Singapore**
    - Singapore win the title for the first time and stop China's winning streak at eight.

==== Tennis ====
- Grand Slams:
  - French Open in Paris, France:
    - Men's singles, fourth round:
      - **Roger Federer** (SUI) [1] def. Stanislas Wawrinka (SUI) [20] 6–3, 7–6(5), 6–2
      - **Tomáš Berdych** (CZE) [15] def. Andy Murray (GBR) [4] 6–4, 7–5, 6–3
      - **Robin Söderling** (SWE) [5] def. Marin Čilić (CRO) [10] 6–4, 6–4, 6–2
      - **Mikhail Youzhny** (RUS) [11] def. Jo-Wilfried Tsonga (FRA) [8] 6–2 retired
    - Women's singles, fourth round:
      - **Nadia Petrova** (RUS) [19] def. Venus Williams (USA) [2] 6–4, 6–3
      - **Caroline Wozniacki** (DEN) [3] def. Flavia Pennetta (ITA) [14] 7–6(5), 6–7(4), 6–2
      - **Elena Dementieva** (RUS) [5] def. Chanelle Scheepers (RSA) 6–1, 6–3
      - **Francesca Schiavone** (ITA) [17] def. Maria Kirilenko (RUS) [30] 6–4, 6–4

=== May 29, 2010 (Saturday) ===
==== Auto racing ====
- Nationwide Series:
  - TECH-NET Auto Service 300 powered by Carquest in Concord, North Carolina: (1) (Nevada) Kyle Busch (Toyota; Joe Gibbs Racing) (2) (Michigan) Brad Keselowski (Dodge; Penske Racing) (3) (Connecticut) Joey Logano (Toyota; Joe Gibbs Racing)
    - Drivers' championship standings (after 12 of 35 races): (1) Keselowski 1946 points (2) Busch 1945 (3) (California) Kevin Harvick (Chevrolet; Kevin Harvick Incorporated) 1852

==== Baseball ====
- Major League Baseball:
  - Roy Halladay becomes the 20th pitcher in Major League Baseball history to throw a perfect game in the Philadelphia Phillies' 1–0 win over the Florida Marlins. This is the first time in the modern era that two perfect games have been thrown in the same season.

==== Basketball ====
- FIBA Asia Champions Cup in Doha, Qatar:
  - Semi-finals:
    - **Al-Rayyan** (Qatar) 82–62 (Jordan) ASU
    - Al-Riyadi Beirut (Lebanon) 64–71 (Iran) **Mahram Tehran**
- (United States) NBA Playoffs (best-of-7 series):
  - Western Conference Finals:
    - Game 6: Los Angeles Lakers 111, Phoenix Suns 103. **Lakers win series 4–2.**
- (Poland) Dominet Bank Ekstraliga Final (best-of-7 series):
  - Game 4: Anwil Włocławek 79–80 Asseco Prokom Gdynia. **Asseco Prokom Gdynia win series 4–0.**
    - Asseco Prokom win the championship for the seventh straight time.
- (Czech Republic) National Basketball League Final (best-of-7 series):
  - Game 2: Nymburk 81–65 Prostějov. Nymburk lead series 2–0.
- (Slovenia) Premier A Slovenian Basketball League Final (best-of-5 series):
  - Game 1: Union Olimpija 68–62 Krka. Union Olimpija lead series 1–0.

==== Cricket ====
- Bangladesh in England:
  - 1st Test in London, day 3:
    - England 505 (125 overs); Bangladesh 237/7 (81.5 overs). Bangladesh trail by 268 runs with 3 wickets remaining in the 1st innings.

==== Cycling ====
- Grand Tours:
  - Giro d'Italia:
    - Stage 20: (gold) Johann Tschopp (SUI) (Bbox Bouygues Telecom) 5h 26' 47" (silver) Cadel Evans (AUS) (BMC Racing Team) + 16" (bronze) Ivan Basso (ITA) (Liquigas–Doimo) + 25"
      - General classification: (1) Basso 87h 23' 00" (2) David Arroyo (ESP) (Caisse d'Epargne) + 1' 15" (3) Vincenzo Nibali (ITA) (Liquigas–Doimo) + 2' 56"

==== Football (soccer) ====
- 2011 UEFA European Under-21 Championship qualification: (teams in ~~strike~~ are eliminated)
  - Group 8: ~~Malta~~ 0–3 Ukraine
    - Standings: Ukraine 14 points (6 matches), France 11 (5), Belgium 11 (6), ~~Slovenia~~ 6 (6), Malta 0 (7)

==== Golf ====
- Senior majors:
  - Senior PGA Championship in Parker, Colorado, United States:
    - Leaderboard after third round (all USA): (1) Jay Don Blake & Tom Lehman 210 (–6) (T3) Fred Couples, Mike Goodes & Mark O'Meara 212

==== Handball ====
- EHF Champions League Final Four in Cologne, Germany:
  - Semifinals:
    - Chekhovskiye Medvedi (Russia) 27–34 (Spain) **FC Barcelona**
    - BM Ciudad Real (Spain) 27–29 (Germany) **THW Kiel**

==== Ice hockey ====
- Stanley Cup Finals (best-of-7 series):
  - Game 1: Chicago Blackhawks 6, Philadelphia Flyers 5. Blackhawks lead series 1–0.

==== Mixed martial arts ====
- UFC 114 in Las Vegas:
  - Welterweight bout: Diego Sanchez (USA) def. John Hathaway (ENG) via unanimous decision (30–27, 30–27, 30–26).
  - Light Heavyweight bout: Antônio Rogério Nogueira (BRA) def. Jason Brilz (USA) via split decision (28–29, 29–28, 29–28).
  - Heavyweight bout: Mike Russow (USA) def. Todd Duffee (USA) via KO (punch) at 2:35 in round 3.
  - Middleweight bout: Dan Miller (USA) def. Michael Bisping (ENG) via unanimous decision (30–27, 30–27, 29–27).
  - Light Heavyweight bout: Rashad Evans (USA) def. Quinton Jackson (USA) via unanimous decision (29–28, 30–27, 30–27).

==== Rugby union ====
- Celtic League playoffs:
  - Grand Final in Dublin:
    - Leinster (Ireland) 12–17 (Wales) **Ospreys**
      - Ospreys win the championship for the third time.
- Super 14 finals series:
  - Final in Soweto:
    - **Bulls** (South Africa) 25–17 (South Africa) Stormers
      - Bulls win the Super 14 for the second consecutive time and third time overall.
- (England) Guinness Premiership playoffs:
  - Final in London:
    - **Leicester Tigers** 33–27 Saracens
      - Leicester win the Premiership for the ninth time.
- (France) Top 14 playoffs:
  - Final in Saint-Denis:
    - Perpignan 6–19 **Clermont Auvergne**
      - Clermont Auvergne win the championship for the first time, having previously lost in ten French championship finals.

==== Table tennis ====
- World Team Championships in Moscow, Russia:
  - Men's semifinals:
    - China 3–0 Japan
    - Germany 3–1 South Korea
  - Women's semifinals:
    - China 3–0 Japan
    - Germany 0–3 Singapore

==== Tennis ====
- Grand Slams:
  - French Open in Paris, France:
    - Men's singles, third round:
      - **Rafael Nadal** (ESP) [2] def. Lleyton Hewitt (AUS) [28] 6–3, 6–4, 6–3
      - **Novak Djokovic** (SRB) [3] def. Victor Hănescu (ROU) [31] 6–3, 3–6, 6–3, 6–2
      - **Teymuraz Gabashvili** (RUS) [Q] def. Andy Roddick (USA) [6] 6–4, 6–4, 6–2
      - **Fernando Verdasco** (ESP) [7] vs Philipp Kohlschreiber (GER) [30] 2–6, 6–3, 6–3, 6–7(1), 6–4
      - **Jürgen Melzer** (AUT) [22] def. David Ferrer (ESP) [9] 6–4, 6–0, 7–6(1)
    - Women's singles, third round:
      - **Serena Williams** (USA) [1] def. Anastasia Pavlyuchenkova (RUS) [29] 6–1, 1–6, 6–2
      - **Jelena Janković** (SRB) [4] def. Alona Bondarenko (UKR) [27] 6–4, 7–6(3)
      - **Samantha Stosur** (AUS) [7] def. Anastasia Pivovarova (RUS) 6–3, 6–2

==== Volleyball ====
- Men's Pan-American Cup in San Juan, Puerto Rico:
  - Classification 5–6: Canada 3–0 Dominican Republic
  - Classification 3–4: Brazil 1–3 (bronze) Puerto Rico
  - Final: (gold) United States 3–0 (silver) Argentina
    - United States win the cup for the third consecutive time and fourth time overall. American Jayson Jablonsky was elected MVP.

=== May 28, 2010 (Friday) ===
==== Basketball ====
- FIBA Asia Champions Cup in Doha, Qatar:
  - Quarter-finals:
    - **ASU** (Jordan) 74–59 (Kazakhstan) Astana Tigers
    - **Mahram (Iran)** 88–60 (Syria) Al-Jalaa
    - **Al-Rayyan (Qatar)** 97–59 (Saudi Arabia) Al-Hilal
    - **Al-Riyadi (Lebanon)** 74–63 (Philippines) Smart Gilas
- (United States) NBA Playoffs (best-of-7 series):
  - Eastern Conference Finals:
    - Game 6: Boston Celtics 96, Orlando Magic 84. **Celtics win series 4–2.**
- (Ukraine) Ukrainian SuperLeague Final (best-of-5 series):
  - Game 4: Azovmash Mariupol 74–77 Budivelnyk Kyiv. Series tied 2–2.
- (Czech Republic) National Basketball League Final (best-of-7 series):
  - Game 1: Nymburk 85–70 Prostějov. Nymburk lead series 1–0.
- (Brazil) Novo Basquete Brasil Finals (best-of-5 series):
  - Game 2: Universo/BRB 93–90 Flamengo. Series tied 1–1.

==== Cricket ====
- Bangladesh in England:
  - 1st Test in London, day 2:
    - England 505 (125 overs; Jonathan Trott 226); Bangladesh 172/2 (53 overs). Bangladesh trail by 333 runs with 8 wickets remaining in the 1st innings.
- South Africa in West Indies:
  - 3rd ODI in Roseau, Dominica:
    - South Africa 224 (47.2 overs); West Indies 157 (38 overs). **South Africa win by 67 runs; lead 5-match series 3–0.**
- Tri-nation series in Zimbabwe:
  - Group stage:
    - India 285/5 (50 overs; Rohit Sharma 114); Zimbabwe 289/4 (48.2 overs) in Bulawayo. **Zimbabwe win by 6 wickets.**

==== Cycling ====
- Grand Tours:
  - Giro d'Italia:
    - Stage 19: (gold) Michele Scarponi (ITA) (Androni Giocattoli) 5h 27' 04" (silver) Ivan Basso (ITA) (Liquigas–Doimo) s.t. (bronze) Vincenzo Nibali (ITA) (Liquigas–Doimo) s.t.
      - General classification: (1) Basso 81h 55' 56" (2) David Arroyo (ESP) (Caisse d'Epargne) + 51" (3) Nibali + 2' 30"

==== Equestrianism ====
- Show jumping
  - Meydan FEI Nations Cup:
    - FEI Nations Cup of Italy in Rome (CSIO 5*): (gold) France (Penelope Leprevost on Mylord Carthago, Kevin Staut on Silvana, Nicolas Delmotte on Luccianno, Patrice Delaveau on Katchina Mail) (silver) United Kingdom (Nick Skelton on Carlo, Peter Charles on Murka's Pom d'Ami, Ben Maher on Robin Hood W, John Whitaker on Peppermill) (bronze) Ireland (Cameron Hanley on Southwind VDL, Darragh Kenny on Obelix, Cian O'Connor on K Club Lady, Billy Twomey on Tinka's Serenade) (bronze) Spain (Pilar Lucrecia Cordon Muro on Herald 3, Julio Arias Cueva on Jarnac, Jesus Germendia Echevarria on Lord Du Mont Milon, Ricardo Jurado Narvaez on Julia des Brumes)
      - Standings (after 2 of 8 competitions): (1) France 20 points (2) United Kingdom 12.5 (3) United States 10

==== Futsal ====
- AFC Championship in Tashkent, Uzbekistan:
  - Semi-finals:
    - **Uzbekistan** 4–3 China
    - **Iran** 7–0 Japan

==== Golf ====
- Senior majors:
  - Senior PGA Championship in Parker, Colorado, United States:
    - Leaderboard after second round (all USA): (1) Fred Couples 137 (–7) (2) Tom Kite 138 (3) Tom Lehman 139

==== Tennis ====
- Grand Slams:
  - French Open in Paris, France:
    - Men's singles, second round:
      - **Rafael Nadal** (ESP) [2] def. Horacio Zeballos (ARG) 6–2, 6–2, 6–3
      - **Novak Djokovic** (SRB) [3] def. Kei Nishikori (JPN) 6–1, 6–4, 6–4
      - **Fernando Verdasco** (ESP) [7] def. Florent Serra (FRA) 6–2, 6–2, 0–6, 6–4
      - **David Ferrer** (ESP) [9] def. Xavier Malisse (BEL) 6–2, 6–2, 2–0 retired
    - Men's singles, third round:
      - **Roger Federer** (SUI) [1] def. Julian Reister (GER) 6–4, 6–0, 6–4
      - **Andy Murray** (GBR) [4] def. Marcos Baghdatis (CYP) [25] 6–2, 6–3, 0–6, 6–2
      - **Robin Söderling** (SWE) [5] def. Albert Montañés (ESP) [29] 6–4, 7–5, 2–6, 6–3
      - **Jo-Wilfried Tsonga** (FRA) [8] def. Thiemo de Bakker (NED) 7–6(6), 6–7(4), 6–3, 6–4
      - **Marin Čilić** (CRO) [10] def. Leonardo Mayer (ARG) 6–4, 3–6, 7–5, 6–7(5), 6–4
    - Women's singles, second round:
      - **Serena Williams** (USA) [1] def. Julia Görges (GER) 6–1, 6–1
      - **Samantha Stosur** (AUS) [7] def. Rossana de los Ríos (PAR) 4–6, 6–1, 6–0
    - Women's singles, third round:
      - **Venus Williams** (USA) [2] def. Dominika Cibulková (SVK) [26] 6–3, 6–4
      - **Caroline Wozniacki** (DEN) [3] def. Alexandra Dulgheru (ROU) [31] 6–3, 6–4
      - **Elena Dementieva** (RUS) [5] def. Aleksandra Wozniak (CAN) 6–7(2), 6–3, 6–4
      - **Maria Kirilenko** (RUS) [30] def. Svetlana Kuznetsova (RUS) [6] 6–3, 2–6, 6–4

==== Volleyball ====
- Men's Pan-American Cup in San Juan, Puerto Rico:
  - Classification 7–8: Colombia 1–3 Mexico
  - Semifinals:
    - **United States** 3–0 Brazil
    - Puerto Rico 2–3 **Argentina**

=== May 27, 2010 (Thursday) ===
==== Basketball ====
- (United States) NBA Playoffs (best-of-7 series):
  - Western Conference Finals:
    - Game 5: Los Angeles Lakers 103, Phoenix Suns 101. Lakers lead series 3–2.
- (Turkey) Turkish Basketball League Playoffs Finals (best-of-7 series):
  - Game 4: Fenerbahçe Ülker 85–79 Efes Pilsen. Fenerbahçe Ülker lead series 3–1.
- (Bulgaria) National Basketball League Finals (best-of-5 series):
  - Game 4: Levski Sofia 71–89 Lukoil Academic. **Lukoil Academic win series 3–1.**
    - Lukoil Academic win the championship for the eighth straight time and 20th overall.
- (Poland) Dominet Bank Ekstraliga Final: (best-of-7 series):
  - Game 3: Anwil Włocławek 76–79 Asseco Prokom Gdynia. Asseco Prokom Gdynia lead series 3–0.
- (Austria) Österreichische Basketball Bundesliga Final (best-of-5 series):
  - Game 4: Gmunden 82–79 Fürstenfeld. Series tied 2–2.
- (Israel) Israeli Basketball Super League Final Four in Tel Aviv:
  - Third-place playoff: (bronze) Hapoel Jerusalem 95–82 Elitzur Maccabi Netanya
  - Final: (gold) Gilboa/Galil 90–77 (silver) Maccabi Tel Aviv
    - Gilboa/Galil win the championship for the second time, having done so in 1993 as Hapoel Galil Elyon.
    - Maccabi Tel Aviv fail to win the title for the second time in three years, after winning all-but-one of the previous 38 years.

==== Cricket ====
- Bangladesh in England:
  - 1st Test in London, day 1:
    - England 362/4 (90 overs; Jonathan Trott 175*); Bangladesh

==== Cycling ====
- Grand Tours:
  - Giro d'Italia:
    - Stage 18: (gold) André Greipel (GER) (Team HTC–Columbia) 3h 14' 59" (silver) Julian Dean (NZL) (Garmin–Transitions) s.t. (bronze) Tiziano Dall'Antonia (ITA) (Liquigas–Doimo) s.t.
      - General classification: (1) David Arroyo (ESP) (Caisse d'Epargne) 76h 26' 37" (2) Ivan Basso (ITA) (Liquigas–Doimo) + 2' 27" (3) Richie Porte (AUS) (Team Saxo Bank) + 2' 44"

==== Football (soccer) ====
- AFC Women's Asian Cup in Chengdu, China:
  - Semi finals:
    - Japan 0–1 **Australia**
    - China 0–1 (a.e.t.) **North Korea**
- European Under-17 Championship in Liechtenstein:
  - Semifinals:
    - **England** 2–1 France
    - **Spain** 3–1 Turkey
- UEFA Women's Under-19 Championship in Macedonia: (teams in **bold** advance to semi-finals, teams in ~~strike~~ are eliminated)
  - Group A:
    - ~~Scotland~~ 1–5 **Germany**
    - **England** 2–1 ~~Italy~~
      - Standings (after 2 matches): Germany, England 6 points, Italy, Scotland 0.
  - Group B:
    - North Macedonia 0–6 Spain
    - Netherlands 2–0 France
      - Standings (after 2 matches): Netherlands 6 points, Spain, France 3, Macedonia 0.
- Toulon Tournament in Toulon, France
  - Third place play-off: Chile 1–2 (bronze) France
  - Final: (gold) Ivory Coast 3–2 (silver) Denmark
    - Côte d'Ivoire become the first team from Africa to win the tournament.

==== Futsal ====
- AFC Championship in Tashkent, Uzbekistan:
  - Quarter-finals:
    - Thailand 2–9 **China**
    - **Japan** 4–0 Kyrgyzstan
    - **Uzbekistan** 5–3 Australia
    - **Iran** 7–1 Lebanon

==== Golf ====
- Senior majors:
  - Senior PGA Championship in Parker, Colorado, United States:
    - Leaderboard after first round (USA unless indicated): (T1) Robin Freeman & Bernhard Langer (DEU) 66 (–6) (T3) Brad Bryant & Tom Lehman 68

==== Tennis ====
- Grand Slams:
  - French Open in Paris, France:
    - Men's singles, second round:
      - **Andy Murray** (GBR) [4] def. Juan Ignacio Chela (ARG) 6–2, 6–7(5), 6–3, 6–2
      - **Andy Roddick** (USA) [6] def. Blaž Kavčič (SLO) 6–3, 5–7, 6–4, 6–2
    - Women's singles, second round:
      - **Jelena Janković** (SRB) [4] def. Kaia Kanepi (EST) 6–2, 3–6, 6–4
      - **Elena Dementieva** (RUS) [5] def. Anabel Medina Garrigues (ESP) 6–2, 7–6(3)
      - **Yaroslava Shvedova** (KAZ) def. Agnieszka Radwańska (POL) [8] 7–5, 6–3

==== Volleyball ====
- Men's Pan-American Cup in San Juan, Puerto Rico:
  - Classification 9: Venezuela 2–3 Colombia
  - Quarterfinals:
    - **United States** 3–0 Dominican Republic
    - Canada 2–3 **Puerto Rico**

=== May 26, 2010 (Wednesday) ===
==== Basketball ====
- FIBA Asia Champions Cup in Doha, Qatar: (teams in **bold** advance to the quarter-finals)
  - Group A:
    - **Mahram** (Iran) 72–78 (Qatar) **Al-Rayyan**
    - Duhok (Iraq) 74–76 (Philippines) **Smart Gilas**
      - Final standings: Al-Rayyan 8 points, Mahram 7, (Kazakhstan) **Astana Tigers** 6, Smart Gilas 5, Duhok 4.
  - Group B:
    - **Al-Hilal** (Saudi Arabia) 63–96 (Jordan) **ASU**
    - **Al-Riyadi** (Lebanon) 92–83 (United Arab Emirates) Al-Nasr
      - Final standings: Al-Riyadi 8 points, ASU 7, (Syria) **Al-Jalaa** 6, Al-Hilal 5, Al-Nasr 4.
- (United States) NBA Playoffs (best-of-7 series):
  - Eastern Conference Finals:
    - Game 5: Orlando Magic 113, Boston Celtics 92. Celtics lead series 3–2.
- (Greece) A1 Ethniki Final (best-of-5 series):
  - Game 1: Panathinaikos 73–54 Olympiacos. Panathinaikos lead series 1–0.
- (Ukraine) Ukrainian SuperLeague Final (best-of-5 series):
  - Game 3: Azovmash Mariupol 77–60 Budivelnyk Kyiv. Azovmash Mariupol lead series 2–1.

==== Cycling ====
- Grand Tours:
  - Giro d'Italia:
    - Stage 17: (gold) Damien Monier (FRA) (Cofidis) 4h 29' 19" (silver) Danilo Hondo (GER) (Lampre–Farnese Vini) + 36" (bronze) Steven Kruijswijk (NED) (Rabobank) + 39"
      - General classification: (1) David Arroyo (ESP) (Caisse d'Epargne) 73h 11' 38" (2) Ivan Basso (ITA) (Liquigas–Doimo) + 2' 27" (3) Richie Porte (AUS) (Team Saxo Bank) + 2' 44"

==== Football (soccer) ====
- 2011 UEFA European Under-21 Championship qualification:
  - Group 2: Switzerland 0–2 Turkey
    - Standings: Switzerland 16 points (8 matches), Turkey 13 (8), Estonia 12 (9), Armenia 10 (8), Georgia 8 (6), Republic of Ireland 4 (7)
- (Georgia (country)) Georgian Cup Final in Tbilisi:
  - **WIT Georgia** 1–0 Dinamo Tbilisi
    - WIT Georgia win the Cup for the first time.
- (Hungary) Magyar Kupa Final in Budapest:
  - **Debrecen** 3–2 Zalaegerszegi TE
    - Debrecen win the Cup for the fourth time.
- (North Macedonia) Macedonian Cup Final in Skopje:
  - Rabotnički 2–3 **Teteks**
    - Teteks win the Cup for the first time.
- (Romania) Cupa României Final in Iași:
  - **CFR Cluj** 0–0 (5–4 pen.) FC Vaslui
    - CFR Cluj win the Cup for the third straight time.

==== Rugby union ====
- IRB Junior World Trophy in Moscow, Russia: (teams in **bold** advance to the final)
  - Pool A:
    - Romania 48–12 Papua New Guinea
    - **Italy** 16–12 Uruguay
      - Final standings: Italy 14 points, Romania 9, Uruguay 7, Papua New Guinea 0.
  - Pool B:
    - Zimbabwe 19–21 Russia
    - Canada 17–38 **Japan**
      - Final standings: Japan 11 points, Russia 8, Canada 5, Zimbabwe 3.
- (England) RFU Championship Final, second leg:
  - Bristol 10–29 (6–9) **Exeter**
    - Exeter win 38–16 on aggregate to claim the inaugural RFU Championship title and earn promotion to the Guinness Premiership for the first time in their history.

==== Tennis ====
- Grand Slams:
  - French Open in Paris, France:
    - Men's singles, second round:
      - **Roger Federer** (SUI) [1] def. Alejandro Falla (COL) 7–6(4), 6–2, 6–4
      - Andy Murray (GBR) [4] vs. Juan Ignacio Chela (ARG) 6–2, 3–3 (match suspended)
      - **Robin Söderling** (SWE) [5] def. Taylor Dent (USA) 6–0, 6–1, 6–1
      - **Jo-Wilfried Tsonga** (FRA) [8] def. Josselin Ouanna (FRA) 6–0, 6–1, 6–4
      - **Marin Čilić** (CRO) [10] def. Daniel Gimeno Traver (ESP) 6–3, 7–6(4), 6–2
    - Women's singles, second round:
      - **Venus Williams** (USA) [2] def. Arantxa Parra Santonja (ESP) 6–2, 6–4
      - **Caroline Wozniacki** (DEN) [3] def. Tathiana Garbin (ITA) 6–3, 6–1
      - **Svetlana Kuznetsova** (RUS) [6] def. Andrea Petković (GER) 4–6, 7–5, 6–4

==== Volleyball ====
- Men's Pan-American Cup in San Juan, Puerto Rico: (teams in **bold** advance to the semifinals; teams in italic advance to quarterfinals playoffs)
  - Group A: Colombia 0–3 Canada
    - Final standings: **Brazil** 4 points, Canada 3, Colombia 2.
  - Group B: United States 3–1 Puerto Rico
    - Final standings: United States 4 points, Puerto Rico 3, Mexico 2.
  - Group C: Venezuela 0–3 Dominican Republic
    - Final standings: **Argentina** 4 points, Dominican Republic 3, Venezuela 2.

=== May 25, 2010 (Tuesday) ===
==== American football ====
- The National Football League announces that Super Bowl XLVIII, to be held in February 2014 following the 2013 season, will be held at Meadowlands Stadium in East Rutherford, New Jersey, the soon-to-open home of the New York Giants and New York Jets. This will be the first Super Bowl to be held in an open-air stadium in a cold-weather location.

==== Basketball ====
- FIBA Asia Champions Cup in Doha, Qatar: (teams in **bold** advance to the quarterfinals; teams in ~~strike~~ are eliminated)
  - Group A:
    - **Al-Rayyan** (Qatar) 86–65 (Kazakhstan) **Astana Tigers**
    - **Mahram** (Iran) 86–72 (Philippines) Smart Gilas
      - Standings: Mahram, Al-Rayyan 6 points (3 games), Astana Tigers 6 (4), Smart Gilas, (Iraq) Duhok 3 (3).
  - Group B:
    - **Al-Jalaa** (Syria) 95–85 (United Arab Emirates) ~~Al-Nasr~~
    - **ASU** (Jordan) 72–73 (Lebanon) **Al-Riyadi**
      - Standings: Al-Riyadi 6 points (3 games), Al-Jalaa 6 (4), ASU 5 (3), (Saudi Arabia) **Al-Hilal** 4 (3), Al-Nasr 3 (3).
- (United States) NBA Playoffs (best-of-7 series):
  - Western Conference Finals:
    - Game 4: Phoenix Suns 115, Los Angeles Lakers 106. Series tied 2–2.
- (Turkey) Turkish Basketball League Playoffs Finals (best-of-7 series):
  - Game 3: Fenerbahçe Ülker 72–70 Efes Pilsen. Fenerbahçe Ülker lead series 2–1.
- (Bulgaria) National Basketball League Finals (best-of-5 series):
  - Game 3: Levski Sofia 86–74 Lukoil Academic. Lukoil Academic lead series 2–1.
- (Israel) Israeli Basketball Super League Final Four in Tel Aviv:
  - Semifinals:
    - Hapoel Jerusalem 69–79 **Gilboa/Galil**
    - **Maccabi Tel Aviv** 104–78 Elitzur Maccabi Netanya

==== Cycling ====
- Grand Tours:
  - Giro d'Italia:
    - Stage 16: (gold) Stefano Garzelli (ITA) (Acqua & Sapone) 41' 28" (silver) Cadel Evans (AUS) (BMC Racing Team) + 42" (bronze) John Gadret (FRA) (Ag2r–La Mondiale) + 54"
      - General classification: (1) David Arroyo (ESP) (Caisse d'Epargne) 68h 32' 26" (2) Ivan Basso (ITA) (Liquigas–Doimo) + 2' 27" (3) Richie Porte (AUS) (Team Saxo Bank) + 2' 36"

==== Futsal ====
- AFC Championship in Tashkent, Uzbekistan: (teams in **bold** advance to quarter-finals)
  - Group A:
    - **Uzbekistan** 4–1 Chinese Taipei
    - Indonesia 2–4 **Lebanon**
      - Final standings: Uzbekistan 9 points, Lebanon 6, Indonesia 3, Chinese Taipei 0.
  - Group B:
    - **Australia** 5–4 Tajikistan
    - **Iran** 7–0 Kuwait
      - Final standings: Iran 9 points, Australia 6, Tajikistan 3, Kuwait 0.
  - Group C:
    - **Thailand** 5–2 Vietnam
    - South Korea 4–4 **Kyrgyzstan**
      - Final standings: Thailand 9 points, Kyrgyzstan 4, Vietnam 3, South Korea 1.
  - Group D:
    - **Japan** 1–0 Turkmenistan
    - Iraq 6–7 **China**
      - Final standings: Japan 9 points, China 6, Iraq 3, Turkmenistan 0.

==== Tennis ====
- Grand Slams:
  - French Open in Paris, France:
    - Men's singles, first round:
      - **Rafael Nadal** (ESP) [2] def. Gianni Mina (FRA) 6–2, 6–2, 6–2
      - **Andy Roddick** (USA) [6] def. Jarkko Nieminen (FIN) 6–2, 4–6, 4–6, 7–6(4), 6–3
      - **Fernando Verdasco** (ESP) [7] def. Igor Kunitsyn (RUS) 6–4, 6–2, 6–2
      - **David Ferrer** (ESP) [9] def. David Guez (FRA) 6–1, 6–3, 6–1
    - Women's singles, first round:
      - **Kimiko Date-Krumm** (JPN) def. Dinara Safina (RUS) [9] 3–6, 6–4, 7–5

==== Volleyball ====
- Men's Pan-American Cup in San Juan, Puerto Rico:
  - Group A: Canada 2–3 Brazil
    - Standings: Brazil 4 points (2 matches), Canada, Colombia 1 (1).
  - Group B: Mexico 2–3 United States
    - Standings: Puerto Rico, United States 2 points (1 match), Mexico 2 (2).
  - Group C: Argentina 3–0 Venezuela
    - Standings: Argentina 4 points (2 matches), Dominican Republic, Venezuela 1 (1).

=== May 24, 2010 (Monday) ===
==== Basketball ====
- FIBA Asia Champions Cup in Doha, Qatar: (teams in **bold** advance to the quarterfinals)
  - Group A:
    - **Mahram** (Iran) 109–68 (Iraq) Duhok
    - **Astana Tigers** (Kazakhstan) 77–71 (OT) (Philippines) Smart Gilas
      - Standings: Astana Tigers 5 points (3 games), Mahram, (Qatar) **Al-Rayyan** 4 (2), Duhok 3 (3), Smart Gilas 2 (2)
  - Group B:
    - **Al-Riyadi** (Lebanon) 83–77 (Saudi Arabia) Al-Hilal
    - Al-Jalaa (Syria) 64–78 (Jordan) **ASU**
      - Standings: ASU, Al-Riyadi 4 points (2 games), Al-Jalaa, Al-Hilal 4 (3), (United Arab Emirates) Al-Nasr 2 (2).
- (United States) NBA Playoffs (best-of-7 series):
  - Eastern Conference Finals:
    - Game 4: Orlando Magic 96, Boston Celtics 92. Celtics lead series 3–1.
- Mike Brown is fired as head coach of the Cleveland Cavaliers, having lost 4–2 to the Boston Celtics in the Conference semi-finals. (AP via NBA)
- (Poland) Dominet Bank Ekstraliga Final: (best-of-7 series):
  - Game 2: Asseco Prokom Gdynia 91–84 Anwil Włocławek. Asseco Prokom Gdynia lead series 2–0.
- (Austria) Österreichische Basketball Bundesliga Final (best-of-5 series):
  - Game 3: Gmunden 65–68 Fürstenfeld. Fürstenfeld lead series 2–1.

==== Cricket ====
- South Africa in West Indies:
  - 2nd ODI in Port of Spain, Trinidad:
    - South Africa 300/5 (50 overs); West Indies 283 (48.1 overs). **South Africa win by 17 runs; lead 5-match series 2–0.**

==== Darts ====
- Premier League Play-offs in London, England:
  - Semi-finals: (best of 15 legs)
    - Simon Whitlock (AUS) 6–8 **James Wade** (ENG)
    - **Phil Taylor** (ENG) 8–1 Mervyn King (ENG)
  - Third place play-off: (best of 15 legs)
    - Simon Whitlock (AUS) 7–8 **Mervyn King** (ENG)
  - Final: (best of 19 legs)
    - James Wade (ENG) 8–10 **Phil Taylor** (ENG)
      - Taylor wins his fifth Premier League title.
      - Taylor achieves two nine dart finishes during the match, and also records the highest checkout of the night with 147, when checking out his first nine dart finish.

==== Football (soccer) ====
- Women's Asian Cup in Chengdu, China:
  - Group A: (teams in **bold** advance to semi-finals)
    - **North Korea** 1–2 **Japan**
    - Myanmar 0–2 Thailand
      - Final standings: Japan 9 points, Korea DPR 6, Thailand 3, Myanmar 0.
- European Under-17 Championship in Liechtenstein: (teams in **bold** advance to semi-finals)
  - Group A:
    - Switzerland 1–3 **France**
    - **Spain** 2–0 Portugal
      - Final standings: Spain 9 points, France 6, Portugal 3, Switzerland 0.
  - Group B:
    - Czech Republic 0–0 Greece
    - **Turkey** 1–2 **England**
      - Final standings: England 9 points, Turkey 4, Czech Republic 2, Greece 1.
- UEFA Women's Under-19 Championship in Macedonia:
  - Group A:
    - Scotland 1–3 England
    - Germany 4–1 Italy
  - Group B:
    - North Macedonia 0–6 Spain
    - Netherlands 2–0 France

==== Futsal ====
- AFC Championship in Tashkent, Uzbekistan: (teams in **bold** advance to quarter-finals, teams in ~~strike~~ are eliminated)
  - Group A:
    - Lebanon 6–4 ~~Chinese Taipei~~
    - Indonesia 2–4 **Uzbekistan**
      - Standings (after 2 matches): Uzbekistan 6 points, Indonesia, Lebanon 3, Chinese Taipei 0.
  - Group B:
    - Tajikistan 4–3 ~~Kuwait~~
    - Australia 3–9 **Iran**
      - Standings (after 2 matches): Iran 6 points, Australia, Tajikistan 3, Kuwait 0.
  - Group C:
    - Kyrgyzstan 4–2 Vietnam
    - South Korea 3–10 Thailand
      - Standings (after 2 matches): Thailand 6 points, Vietnam, Kyrgyzstan 3, Korea Republic 0.
  - Group D:
    - China 6–2 ~~Turkmenistan~~
    - Iraq 1–10 **Japan**
      - Standings (after 2 matches): Japan 6 points, China, Iraq 3, Turkmenistan 0.

==== Ice hockey ====
- Stanley Cup playoffs (best-of-7 series):
  - Eastern Conference Finals:
    - Game 5: Philadelphia Flyers 4, Montreal Canadiens 2. **Flyers win series 4–1.**

==== Tennis ====
- Grand Slams:
  - French Open in Paris, France:
    - Men's singles, first round:
      - **Roger Federer** (SUI) [1] def. Peter Luczak (AUS) 6–4, 6–1, 6–2
      - **Novak Djokovic** (SRB) [3] def. Evgeny Korolev (KAZ) 6–1, 3–6, 6–1, 6–3
      - **Andy Murray** (GBR) [4] def. Richard Gasquet (FRA) 4–6, 6–7(5), 6–4, 6–2, 6–1
    - Women's singles, first round:
      - **Serena Williams** (USA) [1] def. Stefanie Vögele (SUI) 7–6(2), 6–2
      - **Caroline Wozniacki** (DEN) [3] def. Alla Kudryavtseva (RUS) 6–0, 6–3
      - **Jelena Janković** (SRB) [4] def. Alicia Molik (AUS) 6–0, 6–4
      - **Elena Dementieva** (RUS) [5] def. Petra Martić (CRO) 6–1, 6–1
      - **Samantha Stosur** (AUS) [7] def. Simona Halep (ROU) 7–5, 6–1
      - **Agnieszka Radwańska** (POL) [8] def. Elena Baltacha (GBR) 6–0, 7–5

==== Volleyball ====
- Men's Pan-American Cup in San Juan, Puerto Rico:
  - Group A: Brazil 3–1 Colombia
  - Group B: Puerto Rico 3–1 Mexico
  - Group C: Dominican Republic 0–3 Argentina

=== May 23, 2010 (Sunday) ===
==== Athletics ====
- IAAF Diamond League:
  - Shanghai Golden Grand Prix in Shanghai, China
    - Men:
      - 200m: Usain Bolt (JAM) 19.76
      - 400m: Jeremy Wariner (USA) 45.41
      - 1500m: Augustine Kiprono Choge (KEN) 3:32.20
      - 110m hurdles: David Oliver (USA) 12.99
      - Long jump: Ingisious Gaisah (GHA) 7.83 m
      - High jump: Sylwester Bednarek (POL) 2.24 m
      - Pole vault: Malte Mohr (GER) 5.70 m
      - Discus throw: Zoltán Kővágó (HUN) 69.69 m
      - Javelin throw: Andreas Thorkildsen (NOR) 83.47 m
    - Women:
      - 100m: Carmelita Jeter (USA) 11.09
      - 800m: Janeth Jepkosgei Busienei (KEN) 2:01.06
      - 5000m: Sentayehu Ejigu (ETH) 14:30.96
      - 400m hurdles: Lashinda Demus (USA) 53.34
      - 3000m steeplechase: Gladys Jerotich Kipkemoi (KEN) 9:16.82
      - Triple jump: Olga Rypakova (KAZ) 14.89 m
      - Shot put: Nadzeya Astapchuk (BLR) 20.70 m

==== Auto racing ====
- World Touring Car Championship:
  - Race of Italy:
    - Round 5: (1) Andy Priaulx (GBR) (BMW Team RBM; BMW 320si) (2) Augusto Farfus (BRA) (BMW Team RBM; BMW 320si) (3) Rob Huff (GBR) (Chevrolet; Chevrolet Cruze)
    - Round 6: (1) Yvan Muller (FRA) (Chevrolet; Chevrolet Cruze) (2) Tom Coronel (NED) (SR-Sport; SEAT León) (3) Huff
      - Drivers' championship standings (after 6 of 22 rounds): (1) Muller 100 points (2) Gabriele Tarquini (ITA) (SR-Sport; SEAT León) 76 (3) Huff 76
      - Manufacturers' championship standings: (1) Chevrolet 193 points (2) SEAT Customers Technology 177 (3) BMW 158

==== Basketball ====
- FIBA Asia Champions Cup in Doha, Qatar:
  - Group A:
    - Duhok (Iraq) 68–75 (Kazakhstan) Astana Tigers
    - Smart Gilas (Philippines) 58–86 (Qatar) Al-Rayyan
      - Standings: Al-Rayyan 4 points (2 games), Astana Tigers 3 (2), (Iran) Mahram 2 (1), Duhok 2 (2), Smart Gilas 1 (1).
  - Group B:
    - ASU (Jordan) 90–74 (United Arab Emirates) Al-Nasr
    - Al-Hilal (Saudi Arabia) 63–93 (Syria) Al-Jalaa
      - Standings: Al-Jalaa, Al-Hilal 3 points (2 games), ASU, (Lebanon) Al-Riyadi Beirut 2 (1), Al-Nasr 2 (2).
- (United States) NBA Playoffs (best-of-7 series):
  - Western Conference Finals:
    - Game 3: Phoenix Suns 118, Los Angeles Lakers 109. Lakers lead series 2–1.
- (Ukraine) Ukrainian SuperLeague Final (best-of-5 series):
  - Game 2: Budivelnyk Kyiv 95–91 Azovmash Mariupol. Series tied 1–1.

==== Cricket ====
- New Zealand against Sri Lanka in USA:
  - 2nd T20I in Lauderhill, Florida:
    - New Zealand 81 (17.3 overs); Sri Lanka 86/3 (15.3 overs). Sri Lanka win by 7 wickets, 2-match series drawn 1–1.

==== Cycling ====
- Grand Tours:
  - Giro d'Italia:
    - Stage 15: (gold) Ivan Basso (ITA) (Liquigas–Doimo) 6h 21' 58" (silver) Cadel Evans (AUS) (BMC Racing Team) + 1' 19" (bronze) Michele Scarponi (ITA) (Androni Giocattoli) + 1' 30"
      - General classification: (1) David Arroyo (ESP) (Caisse d'Epargne) 67h 48' 42" (2) Richie Porte (AUS) (Team Saxo Bank) + 2' 35" (3) Basso + 3' 33"
- Tour of California:
  - Stage 8: (gold) Ryder Hesjedal (CAN) (Garmin–Transitions) 3h 21' 56" (silver) George Hincapie (USA) (BMC Racing Team) s.t. (bronze) Carlos Barredo (ESP) (Quick-Step) s.t.
    - Final general classification: (1) Michael Rogers (AUS) (Team HTC–Columbia) 33h 08' 30" (2) David Zabriskie (USA) (Garmin–Transitions) + 9" (3) Levi Leipheimer (USA) (Team RadioShack) + 25"

==== Darts ====
- Premier League Play-offs in London, England: Postponed to May 24 due to a power cut.

==== Football (soccer) ====
- Women's Asian Cup in Chengdu, China:
  - Group B: (teams in **bold** advance to the semi-finals)
    - **China** 1–0 **Australia**
    - Vietnam 0–5 South Korea
      - Final standings: China PR 7 points, Australia 6, Korea Republic 4, Vietnam 0.
- 2011 UEFA European Under-21 Championship qualification:
  - Group 2: Estonia 1–0 Turkey
    - Standings: Switzerland 16 points (7 matches), Estonia 12 (9), Turkey 10 (7), Armenia 10 (8), Georgia 8 (6), Republic of Ireland 4 (7).
- (Hungary) Hungarian First Division, final matchday: (team in **bold** qualify for the Champions League, teams in italics qualify for Europa League)
  - (10) Kecskemét 1–0 (1) **Debrecen**
  - (3) Győr 1–0 (2) Videoton
    - Final standings: Debrecen 62 points, Videoton 61, Győr 57.
    - Debrecen win the Championship for the second consecutive time and fifth time overall.
- (Mexico) Primera División de México Bicentenario Liguilla Final, second leg: (first leg score in parentheses)
  - **Toluca** 0–0 (2–2) Santos Laguna. 2–2 on aggregate, Toluca win 4–3 on penalties.
    - Toluca win the championship for the tenth time.
- Azerbaijan Cup Final in Baku:
  - Khazar Lankaran 1–2 (a.e.t.) **Baku**
    - Baku win the Cup for the second time.
- (Belarus) Belarusian Cup Final in Minsk:
  - **BATE Borisov** 5–0 Torpedo Zhodino
    - BATE win the Cup for the second time.
- (Malta) Maltese Cup Final in Ta' Qali:
  - **Valletta** 2–1 Qormi
    - Valletta win the Cup for the 12th time.

==== Futsal ====
- AFC Championship in Tashkent, Uzbekistan:
  - Group A:
    - Uzbekistan 3–1 Lebanon
    - Chinese Taipei 1–6 Indonesia
  - Group B:
    - Iran 19–2 Tajikistan
    - Kuwait 2–4 Australia
  - Group C:
    - Thailand 4–2 Kyrgyzstan
    - Vietnam 7–3 South Korea
  - Group D:
    - Japan 5–1 China
    - Turkmenistan 3–5 Iraq

==== Golf ====
- PGA Tour:
  - HP Byron Nelson Championship in Irving, Texas:
    - Winner: Jason Day (AUS) 270 (−10)
      - Day wins his first PGA Tour title.
- European Tour:
  - BMW PGA Championship in Virginia Water, England:
    - Winner: Simon Khan (ENG) 278 (−6)
      - Khan wins his second European Tour title.
- LPGA Tour:
  - Sybase Match Play Championship in Gladstone, New Jersey:
    - Consolation Match: **Jiyai Shin** (KOR) def. Amy Yang (KOR) 3 & 2
    - Final: **Sun Young Yoo** (KOR) def. Angela Stanford (USA) 3 & 1
      - Yoo wins her first LPGA Tour title.

==== Ice hockey ====
- Men's World Championship in Germany:
  - Bronze medal game: Germany 1–3 (bronze) Sweden
  - Gold medal game: (silver) Russia 1–2 (gold) Czech Republic
    - Czech Republic win the Championship for the 12th time.
- Stanley Cup playoffs (best-of-7 series):
  - Western Conference Finals:
    - Game 4: Chicago Blackhawks 4, San Jose Sharks 2. **Blackhawks win series 4–0.**
- Memorial Cup in Brandon, Manitoba:
  - Final: **Windsor Spitfires** 9, Brandon Wheat Kings 1.
    - Windsor Spitfires win their second consecutive Memorial Cup.

==== Motorcycle racing ====
- Moto GP:
  - French motorcycle Grand Prix in Le Mans, France:
    - MotoGP: (1) Jorge Lorenzo (ESP) (Yamaha) (2) Valentino Rossi (ITA) (Yamaha) (3) Andrea Dovizioso (ITA) (Honda)
      - Riders' championship standings (after 3 of 18 rounds): (1) Lorenzo 70 points (2) Rossi 61 (3) Dovizioso 42
      - Manufacturers' championship standings: (1) Yamaha 75 points (2) Honda 52 (3) Ducati 39
    - Moto2: (1) Toni Elías (ESP) (Moriwaki) (2) Julián Simón (ESP) (Suter) (3) Simone Corsi (ITA) (MotoBi)
      - Riders' championship standings (after 3 of 17 rounds): (1) Elías 63 points (2) Shoya Tomizawa (JPN) (Suter) 45 (3) Corsi 35
      - Manufacturers' championship standings: (1) Suter 65 points (2) Moriwaki 63 (3) MotoBi 37
    - 125cc: (1) Pol Espargaró (ESP) (Derbi) (2) Nicolás Terol (ESP) (Aprilia) (3) Marc Márquez (ESP) (Derbi)
      - Riders' championship standings (after 3 of 17 rounds): (1) Terol 65 points (2) Espargaró 63 (3) Esteve Rabat (ESP) (Aprilia) 34
      - Manufacturers' championship standings: (1) Derbi 70 points (2) Aprilia 65 (3) Honda 4

==== Rugby union ====
- Amlin Challenge Cup Final in Marseille:
  - **Cardiff Blues** (Wales) 28–21 (France) Toulon
    - Cardiff Blues win their first Challenge Cup, becoming the first Welsh side to win any European club trophy.
- IRB Sevens World Series:
  - London Sevens in London:
    - Shield: France 21–24 **Kenya**
    - Bowl: Portugal 17–19 **Canada**
    - Plate: Fiji 24–26 **New Zealand**
    - Cup: **Australia** 19–14 South Africa
      - Standings (after 7 of 8 events): (1) Samoa 140 points (2) New Zealand 133 (3) Australia & Fiji 102
- (France) Rugby Pro D2 Promotion Final in Brive-la-Gaillarde:
  - Lyon 26–32 **La Rochelle**
    - La Rochelle joins regular-season champion Agen in the 2010–11 Top 14.

==== Tennis ====
- Grand Slams:
  - French Open in Paris, France, day 1: (seeding in parentheses)
    - Men's singles, first round:
      - **Robin Söderling** (SWE) [5] def. Laurent Recouderc (FRA) [WC] 6–0 6–2, 6–3
      - **Jo-Wilfried Tsonga** (FRA) [8] def. Daniel Brands (GER) 4–6, 6–3, 6–2, 6–7(2), 7–5
      - **Marin Čilić** (CRO) [10] def. Ricardo Mello (BRA) 6–1, 3–6, 6–3, 6–1
    - Women's singles, first round:
      - **Venus Williams** (USA) [2] def. Patty Schnyder (SUI) 6–3, 6–3
      - **Svetlana Kuznetsova** (RUS) [6] def. Sorana Cîrstea (ROU) 6–3, 6–1
      - **Gisela Dulko** (ARG) def. Victoria Azarenka (BLR) [10] 6–1, 6–2

=== May 22, 2010 (Saturday) ===
==== Auto racing ====
- NASCAR Sprint Cup Series:
  - NASCAR Sprint All-Star Race XXVI in Concord, North Carolina:
    - (1) (Nevada) Kurt Busch (Dodge, Penske Racing) (2) (New Jersey) Martin Truex Jr. (Toyota, Michael Waltrip Racing) (3) (Connecticut) Joey Logano (Toyota, Joe Gibbs Racing)
- IndyCar Series:
  - Indianapolis 500 Qualifying in Speedway, Indiana:
    - Front row: (1) (BRA) Hélio Castroneves (Team Penske) (2) (AUS) Will Power (Team Penske) (3) (GBR) Dario Franchitti (Chip Ganassi Racing)
      - Three-time Indy 500 winner Castroneves claims his fourth pole in the race, tying him for second on the all-time list.

==== Basketball ====
- FIBA Asia Champions Cup in Doha, Qatar:
  - Group A:
    - Astana Tigers (Kazakhstan) 49–77 (Iran) Mahram
    - Al-Rayyan (Qatar) 88–66 (Iraq) Duhok
  - Group B:
    - Al-Jalaa (Syria) 77–87 (Lebanon) Al-Riyadi
    - Al-Nasr (United Arab Emirates) 69–77 (Saudi Arabia) Al-Hilal
- (United States) NBA Playoffs (best-of-7 series):
  - Eastern Conference Finals:
    - Game 3: Boston Celtics 94, Orlando Magic 71. Celtics lead series 3–0.
- (Turkey) Turkish Basketball League Playoffs Finals (best-of-7 series):
  - Game 2: Efes Pilsen 73–64 Fenerbahçe Ülker. Series tied 1–1.
- (Bulgaria) National Basketball League Finals (best-of-5 series):
  - Game 2: Lukoil Academic 83–70 Levski Sofia. Lukoil Academic lead series 2–0.
- (Poland) Dominet Bank Ekstraliga Final: (best-of-7 series):
  - Game 1: Asseco Prokom Gdynia 93–86 Anwil Włocławek. Asseco Prokom Gdynia lead series 1–0.
- (Austria) Österreichische Basketball Bundesliga Final (best-of-5 series):
  - Game 2: Fürstenfeld 70–85 Gmunden. Series tied 1–1.
- (Brazil) Novo Basquete Brasil Finals (best-of-5 series):
  - Game 1: Flamengo 88–84 Universo/BRB. Flamengo lead series 1–0.

==== Cricket ====
- South Africa in West Indies:
  - 1st ODI in Port of Spain, Trinidad:
    - South Africa 280/7 (48/48 overs; Hashim Amla 102, AB de Villiers 102); West Indies 215 (44.1 overs). **South Africa win by 66 runs (D/L), lead 5-match series 1–0.**
- New Zealand against Sri Lanka in USA:
  - 1st T20I in Lauderhill, Florida:
    - New Zealand 120/7 (20 overs); Sri Lanka 92 (19.4 overs). **New Zealand win by 28 runs, lead 2-match series 1–0.**

==== Cycling ====
- Grand Tours:
  - Giro d'Italia:
    - Stage 14: (gold) Vincenzo Nibali (ITA) (Liquigas–Doimo) 4h 57' 51" (silver) Ivan Basso (ITA) (Liquigas–Doimo) + 23" (bronze) Michele Scarponi (ITA) (Androni Giocattoli) + 23"
      - General classification: (1) David Arroyo (ESP) (Caisse d'Epargne) 61h 22' 54" (2) Richie Porte (AUS) (Team Saxo Bank) + 39" (3) Xavier Tondó (ESP) (Cervélo TestTeam) + 2' 12"
- Tour of California:
  - Stage 7: (gold) Tony Martin (GER) (Team HTC–Columbia) 41' 41" (silver) Michael Rogers (AUS) (Team HTC–Columbia) + 22" (bronze) David Zabriskie (USA) (Garmin–Transitions) + 27"
    - General classification: (1) Rogers 29h 46' 06" (2) Zabriskie + 9" (3) Levi Leipheimer (USA) (Team RadioShack) + 25"

==== Equestrianism ====
- Show jumping:
  - 3rd Competition in La Mandria: (gold) Marco Kutscher (GER) on Cash (silver) Nick Skelton (GBR) on Carlo (bronze) Rodrigo Pessoa (BRA) on Rebozo
    - Standings (after 3 of 9 competitions): (1) Kutscher 105 points (2) Marcus Ehning (GER) 90 (3) Patrick McEntee (AZE) 70

==== Football (soccer) ====
- Women's Asian Cup in Chengdu, China:
  - Group A: (teams in **bold** advance to semi-finals, teams in ~~strike~~ are eliminated)
    - ~~Thailand~~ 0–4 **Japan**
    - ~~Myanmar~~ 0–2 **North Korea**
      - Standings (after 2 matches): Japan, Korea DPR 6 points, Thailand, Myanmar 0.
- UEFA Champions League Final in Madrid:
  - Bayern Munich (Germany) 0–2 (Italy) **Internazionale**
    - Internazionale win the title for the third time and the first since 1965, and becomes only the sixth team to complete a European continental treble.
    - José Mourinho becomes only the third manager to win two European Cup finals with different teams, after Ernst Happel and Ottmar Hitzfeld.
- (Poland) Polish Cup Final in Bydgoszcz:
  - Pogoń Szczecin 0–1 **Jagiellonia Białystok**
    - Jagiellonia Białystok win the Cup for the first time.
- (South Africa) Nedbank Cup Final in Johannesburg:
  - AmaZulu 0–3 **Bidvest Wits**
    - Bidvest Wits win the Cup for the first time.
- (England) Football League Championship play-off final:
  - **Blackpool** 3–2 Cardiff City
    - The Seasiders earn promotion to the Premier League with the win, returning to the top flight for the first time in four decades.

==== Ice hockey ====
- Men's World Championship in Germany:
  - Semi-finals:
    - Sweden 2–3 (SO) **Czech Republic**
    - **Russia** 2–1 Germany
- Stanley Cup playoffs (best-of-7 series):
  - Eastern Conference Finals:
    - Game 4: Philadelphia Flyers 3, Montreal Canadiens 0. Flyers lead series 3–1.

==== Rugby union ====
- 2011 Rugby World Cup qualifying:
  - Asian Five Nations: (team in **bold** advance to 2011 Rugby World Cup, team in italic advance to Final Place Play-off, team in ~~strike~~ relegated to Division One in 2011)
    - **Japan** 94–5 Hong Kong in Tokyo
    - ~~South Korea~~ 25–32 Kazakhstan in Incheon
      - Final standings: Japan 24 points, Kazakhstan 13, Hong Kong 12, Arabian Gulf 10, Korea 2.
  - European Nations Cup Champions Playoff Series:
    - Round 5, first leg: Ukraine 3–33 Romania in Kyiv
- IRB Junior World Trophy in Moscow, Russia:
  - Pool A:
    - Uruguay 42–14 Papua New Guinea
    - Italy 30–7 Romania
      - Standings (after 2 matches): Italy 10 points, Uruguay 6, Romania 4, Papua New Guinea 0.
  - Pool B:
    - Japan 20–20 Zimbabwe
    - Russia 17–15 Canada
      - Standings (after 2 matches): Japan 6 points, Canada 5, Russia 4, Zimbabwe 2.
- Heineken Cup Final in Saint-Denis:
  - Biarritz (France) 19–21 (France) **Toulouse**
    - Toulouse win their fourth Heineken Cup.
- Super 14 finals series:
  - Semi-finals:
    - **Bulls** (South Africa) 39–24 (New Zealand) Crusaders in Soweto
    - **Stormers** (South Africa) 26–6 (Australia) Waratahs

==== Tennis ====
- ATP World Tour:
  - World Team Cup in Düsseldorf, Germany:
    - Final: **Argentina** def. United States 2–1
      - **Juan Mónaco** (ARG) def. Sam Querrey (USA) 1–6, 6–2, 6–3
      - **Horacio Zeballos** (ARG) def. Robby Ginepri (USA) 6–4, 6–7(7), 7–5
      - **Bob Bryan / Mike Bryan** (USA) def. Eduardo Schwank / Diego Veronelli (ARG) 6–1, 6–2
        - Argentina win the Cup for the fourth time.
  - Open de Nice Côte d'Azur in Nice, France:
    - Final: **Richard Gasquet** (FRA) def. Fernando Verdasco (ESP) 6–3, 5–7, 7–6(5)
      - Gasquet wins his sixth career title.
- WTA Tour:
  - Internationaux de Strasbourg in Strasbourg, France:
    - Final: **Maria Sharapova** (RUS) def. Kristina Barrois (GER) 7–5, 6–1
      - Sharapova wins her 22nd career title.
  - Polsat Warsaw Open in Warsaw, Poland:
    - Final: **Alexandra Dulgheru** (ROU) def. Zheng Jie (CHN) 6–3, 6–4
      - Dulgheru wins her second career title, defending her Warsaw Open title.

=== May 21, 2010 (Friday) ===
==== Basketball ====
- (Ukraine) Ukrainian SuperLeague Final (best-of-5 series):
  - Game 1: Budivelnyk Kyiv 66–80 Azovmash Mariupol. Azovmash Mariupol lead series 1–0.

==== Cycling ====
- Grand Tours:
  - Giro d'Italia:
    - Stage 13: (gold) Manuel Belletti (ITA) (Colnago–CSF Inox) 5h 27' 12" (silver) Greg Henderson (NZL) (Team Sky) s.t. (bronze) Iban Mayoz (ESP) (Footon–Servetto–Fuji) s.t.
      - General classification: (1) Richie Porte (AUS) (Team Saxo Bank) 56h 20' 56" (2) David Arroyo (ESP) (Caisse d'Epargne) + 1' 42" (3) Robert Kišerlovski (CRO) (Liquigas–Doimo) + 1' 56"
- Tour of California:
  - Stage 6: (gold) Peter Sagan (SVK) (Liquigas–Doimo) 6h 07' 08" (silver) Rory Sutherland (AUS) (UnitedHealthcare–Maxxis) s.t. (bronze) Michael Rogers (AUS) (Team HTC–Columbia) s.t.
    - General classification: (1) Rogers 29h 04' 03" (2) David Zabriskie (USA) (Garmin–Transitions) + 4" (3) Sagan + 9"

==== Football (soccer) ====
- Women's Asian Cup in Chengdu, China:
  - Group B: (teams in **bold** advance to semifinals, teams in ~~strike~~ are eliminated)
    - South Korea 1–3 **Australia**
    - ~~Vietnam~~ 0–5 China
      - Standings (after 2 matches): Australia 6 points, China PR 4, Korea Republic 1, Vietnam 0.
- European Under-17 Championship in Liechtenstein: (teams in **bold** advance to semifinals, teams in ~~strike~~ are eliminated)
  - Group A:
    - Spain 4–0 Switzerland
    - France 1–0 Portugal
      - Standings (after 2 matches): Spain 6 points, France, Portugal 3, Switzerland 0.
  - Group B:
    - Turkey 1–1 Czech Republic
    - ~~Greece~~ 0–1 **England**
      - Standings (after 2 matches): England 6 points, Turkey 4, Czech Republic 1, Greece 0.

==== Handball ====
- IHF Super Globe in Doha, Qatar:
  - Third place play-off: Al-Sadd (Lebanon) 22–33 (bronze) (Egypt) Zamalek
  - Final: (gold) Ciudad Real (Spain) 30–25 (silver) (Qatar) Al-Sadd
    - Ciudad Real wins the IHF Super Globe for the second consecutive time.

==== Ice hockey ====
- Stanley Cup playoffs (best-of-7 series):
  - Western Conference Finals:
    - Game 3: Chicago Blackhawks 3, San Jose Sharks 2 (OT). Blackhawks lead series 3–0.
- Memorial Cup in Brandon, Manitoba:
  - Semi-final: **Brandon Wheat Kings** 5, Calgary Hitmen 4 (OT).

=== May 20, 2010 (Thursday) ===
==== Basketball ====
- (Turkey) Turkish Basketball League Playoffs Finals: (best-of-7 series):
  - Game 1: Efes Pilsen 62–78 Fenerbahçe Ülker. Fenerbahçe Ülker lead series 1–0.
- (Bulgaria) National Basketball League Finals (best-of-5 series):
  - Game 1: Lukoil Academic 95–87 Levski Sofia. Lukoil Academic lead series 1–0.

==== Cricket ====
- South Africa in West Indies:
  - 2nd T20 in Port of Spain, Trinidad:
    - South Africa 120/7 (20 overs), West Indies 119/7 (20 overs). **South Africa win by 1 run; win the 2-match series 2–0.**

==== Cycling ====
- Grand Tours:
  - Giro d'Italia:
    - Stage 12: (gold) Filippo Pozzato (ITA) (Team Katusha) 5h 15' 50" (silver) Thomas Voeckler (FRA) (Bbox Bouygues Telecom) s.t. (bronze) Jérôme Pineau (FRA) (Quick-Step) s.t.
      - General classification: (1) Richie Porte (AUS) (Team Saxo Bank) 50h 46' 16" (2) David Arroyo (ESP) (Caisse d'Epargne) + 1' 42" (3) Robert Kišerlovski (CRO) (Liquigas–Doimo) + 1' 56"
- Tour of California:
  - Stage 5: (gold) Peter Sagan (SVK) (Liquigas–Doimo) 4h 52' 28" (silver) Michael Rogers (AUS) (Team HTC–Columbia) s.t. (bronze) David Zabriskie (USA) (Garmin–Transitions) s.t.
    - General classification: (1) Rogers 22h 56' 59" (2) Zabriskie + 0" (3) Levi Leipheimer (USA) (Team RadioShack) + 10"
- Floyd Landis, the initial winner of the 2006 Tour de France before being stripped of his title due to a doping case, admits to using performance-enhancing drugs during his career. Landis also accused former teammates Lance Armstrong, George Hincapie, Levi Leipheimer and David Zabriskie of using the banned drug EPO during the 2002 and 2003 seasons. (BBC, ESPN)

==== Football (soccer) ====
- Women's Asian Cup in Chengdu, China:
  - Group A:
    - North Korea 3–0 Thailand
    - Japan 8–0 Myanmar
- 2011 FIFA Women's World Cup qualification (UEFA): (teams in ~~strike~~ are eliminated)
  - Group 4: Ukraine 4–2 Hungary
    - Standings: Poland 12 points (5 matches), Hungary 11 (6), Ukraine 7 (4), Romania 7 (5), ~~Bosnia and Herzegovina~~ 0 (6).
  - Group 5: ~~Malta~~ 0–6 England
    - Standings: England 15 points (5 matches), Spain 15 (6), ~~Turkey~~ 6 (5), ~~Austria~~ 3 (4), Malta 0 (6).
- 2011 UEFA European Under-21 Championship qualification:
  - Group 2: Estonia 2–3 Armenia
    - Standings: Switzerland 16 points (7 matches), Turkey 10 (6), Armenia 10 (8), Estonia 9 (8), Georgia 8 (6), Republic of Ireland 4 (7).
- UEFA Women's Champions League Final in Getafe, Spain:
  - Lyon (France) 0–0 (6–7 pen.) (Germany) **Turbine Potsdam**
    - Turbine Potsdam win the UEFA Women's Champions League for the second time.
- Copa Libertadores Quarterfinals, second leg: (first leg score in parentheses)
  - **Universidad de Chile** 1–2 (3–2) (Brazil) Flamengo. 3–3 on points; Universidad de Chile win on away goals.
  - Estudiantes (Argentina) 2–1 (0–1) (Brazil) **Internacional**. 3–3 on points; Internacional win on away goals.
- (Mexico) Primera División de México Bicentenario Liguilla Final, first leg:
  - Santos Laguna 2–2 Toluca

==== Ice hockey ====
- Men's World Championship in Germany:
  - Quarter-finals:
    - **Sweden** 4–2 Denmark
    - Finland 1–2 (SO) **Czech Republic**
    - **Russia** 5–2 Canada
    - Switzerland 0–1 **Germany**
- Stanley Cup playoffs (best-of-7 series):
  - Eastern Conference Finals:
    - Game 3: Montreal Canadiens 5, Philadelphia Flyers 1. Flyers lead series 2–1.

=== May 19, 2010 (Wednesday) ===
==== Basketball ====
- (United States) NBA Playoffs (best-of-7 series):
  - Western Conference Finals:
    - Game 2: Los Angeles Lakers 124, Phoenix Suns 112. Lakers lead series 2–0.
- (Austria) Österreichische Basketball Bundesliga Final (best-of-5 series):
  - Game 1: Fürstenfeld 80–79 Gmunden. Fürstenfeld lead series 1–0.

==== Cricket ====
- South Africa in West Indies:
  - 1st T20 in Port of Spain, Trinidad:
    - South Africa 136/7 (20 overs); West Indies 123 (19.5 overs). **South Africa win by 13 runs; lead 2-match series 1–0.**

==== Cycling ====
- Grand Tours:
  - Giro d'Italia:
    - Stage 11: (gold) Evgeni Petrov (RUS) (Team Katusha) 6h 28' 29" (silver) Dario Cataldo (ITA) (Quick-Step) + 5" (bronze) Carlos Sastre (ESP) (Cervélo TestTeam) + 5"
      - General classification: (1) Richie Porte (AUS) (Team Saxo Bank) 45h 30' 16" (2) David Arroyo (ESP) (Caisse d'Epargne) + 1' 42" (3) Robert Kišerlovski (CRO) (Liquigas–Doimo) + 1' 56"
- Tour of California:
  - Stage 4: (gold) Francesco Chicchi (ITA) (Liquigas–Doimo) 4h 55' 02" (silver) Juan José Haedo (ARG) (Team Saxo Bank) s.t. (bronze) Mark Cavendish (GBR) (Team HTC–Columbia) s.t.
    - General classification: (1) David Zabriskie (USA) (Garmin–Transitions) 18h 04' 35" (2) Michael Rogers (AUS) (Team HTC–Columbia) + 4" (3) Levi Leipheimer (USA) (Team RadioShack) + 6"

==== Football (soccer) ====
- Women's Asian Cup in Chengdu, China:
  - Group B:
    - Australia 2–0 Vietnam
    - China 0–0 South Korea
- 2011 UEFA European Under-21 Championship qualification: (teams in ~~strike~~ are eliminated)
  - Group 7: Croatia 1–1 Slovakia
    - Standings: Croatia 13 points (6 matches), Slovakia 11 (6), Serbia 9 (5), Norway 4 (5), ~~Cyprus~~ 3 (6).
- Copa Libertadores Quarterfinals, second leg: (first leg score in parentheses)
  - **São Paulo** (Brazil) 2–0 (2–0) (Brazil) Cruzeiro. São Paulo progress 6–0 on points.
- (Bosnia and Herzegovina) Kup Bosne i Hercegovine Final, second leg: (first leg score in parentheses)
  - Željezničar 2–2 (1–1) **Borac**. 3–3 on aggregate; Borac win on away goals.
    - Borac win the Cup for the first time.
- (Latvia) Latvian Cup Final in Riga:
  - **Jelgava** 2–2 (6–5 pen.) Jūrmala
    - Jelgava win the Cup for the fourth time.
- (Montenegro) Montenegrin Cup Final in Podgorica:
  - **Rudar** 2–1 Budućnost
    - Rudar win the Cup for the second time.
- (Spain) Copa del Rey Final in Barcelona:
  - **Sevilla** 2–0 Atlético Madrid
    - Sevilla win the Copa del Rey for the fifth time.

==== Ice hockey ====
- Memorial Cup in Brandon, Manitoba (team in **bold** advances to the Championship Game, teams in italics advance to the semi-final):
  - Round robin:
    - Calgary Hitmen 5, Brandon Wheat Kings 1.
      - Final standings: **Windsor Spitfires** 6 points, Calgary Hitmen 4, Brandon Wheat Kings 2, Moncton Wildcats 0.

==== Rugby union ====
- (England) RFU Championship Final, first leg:
  - Exeter Chiefs 9–6 Bristol

=== May 18, 2010 (Tuesday) ===
==== Basketball ====
- (United States) NBA Playoffs (best-of-7 series):
  - Eastern Conference Finals:
    - Game 2: Boston Celtics 95, Orlando Magic 92. Celtics lead series 2–0.
- NBA Draft Lottery:
  - The Washington Wizards will have the first overall pick in the NBA draft on June 24. The Philadelphia 76ers will have the second pick and the New Jersey Nets will have the third selection.

==== Cycling ====
- Grand Tours:
  - Giro d'Italia:
    - Stage 10: (gold) Tyler Farrar (USA) (Garmin–Transitions) 5h 49' 14" (silver) Fabio Sabatini (ITA) (Liquigas–Doimo) s.t. (bronze) Julian Dean (NZL) (Garmin–Transitions) s.t.
      - General classification: (1) Alexander Vinokourov (KAZ) (Astana) 38h 59' 00" (2) Cadel Evans (AUS) (BMC Racing Team) + 1' 12" (3) Vincenzo Nibali (ITA) (Liquigas–Doimo) + 1' 33"
- Tour of California:
  - Stage 3: (gold) David Zabriskie (USA) (Garmin–Transitions) 4h 26' 09" (silver) Michael Rogers (AUS) (Team HTC–Columbia) s.t. (bronze) Levi Leipheimer (USA) (Team RadioShack) s.t.
    - General classification: (1) Zabriskie 13h 09' 33" (2) Rogers + 4" (3) Leipheimer + 6"

==== Football (soccer) ====
- European Under-17 Championship in Liechtenstein:
  - Group A:
    - France 1–2 Spain
    - Portugal 3–0 Switzerland
  - Group B:
    - Greece 1–3 Turkey
    - England 3–1 Czech Republic
- Copa Libertadores Quarterfinals, second leg: (first leg score in parentheses)
  - Libertad (Paraguay) 2–0 (0–3) (Mexico) **Guadalajara**. 3–3 on points; Guadalajara win on goal difference (3–2).
- (Uruguay) Uruguayan Primera División Finals, second leg: (first leg score in parentheses)
  - **Peñarol** 1–1 (1–0) Nacional. Peñarol win 2–1 on aggregate.
    - Peñarol win the championship for the 41st time.
- Czech Republic Cup Final in Prague:
  - Jablonec 1–2 **Viktoria Plzeň**
    - Viktoria Plzeň win the Cup for the first time.

==== Ice hockey ====
- Men's World Championship in Germany:
  - Group E in Cologne: (teams in **bold** advance to the quarter-finals)
    - Slovakia 1–2 **Germany**
    - **Russia** 5–0 **Finland**
      - Final standings: Russia 15 points, Finland 9, Germany 7, **Denmark** 6, Belarus 5, Slovakia 3.
  - Group F in Mannheim: (teams in **bold** advance to the quarter-finals)
    - **Canada** 2–3 **Czech Republic**
    - **Switzerland** 0–5 **Sweden**
      - Final standings: Sweden 12 points, Switzerland, Czech Republic 9, Canada, Norway 6, Latvia 3.
  - Relegation Round: (teams in ~~strike~~ are relegated to Division I in 2011)
    - United States 3–2 (SO) ~~Italy~~
    - ~~Kazakhstan~~ 3–5 France
      - Final standings: United States 8 points, France 6, Italy 4, Kazakhstan 0.
- Stanley Cup playoffs (all series best-of-7):
  - Eastern Conference Finals:
    - Game 2: Philadelphia Flyers 3, Montreal Canadiens 0. Flyers lead series 2–0.
  - Western Conference Finals:
    - Game 2: Chicago Blackhawks 4, San Jose Sharks 2. Blackhawks lead series 2–0.
- Memorial Cup in Brandon, Manitoba: (team in **bold** advances to the Championship Game, teams in italics advance to the semi-final)
  - Round robin:
    - **Windsor Spitfires** 4, Moncton Wildcats 3 (OT)
      - Standings: Windsor Spitfires 6 points (3 matches), Brandon Wheat Kings, Calgary Hitmen 2 (2), Moncton Wildcats 0 (3).

==== Rugby union ====
- IRB Junior World Trophy in Moscow, Russia:
  - Pool A:
    - Papua New Guinea 0–74 Italy
    - Uruguay 12–15 Romania
  - Pool B:
    - Canada 22–6 Zimbabwe
    - Russia 17–31 Japan

=== May 17, 2010 (Monday) ===
==== Basketball ====
- (United States) NBA Playoffs (best-of-7 series):
  - Western Conference Finals:
    - Game 1: Los Angeles Lakers 128, Phoenix Suns 107. Lakers lead series 1–0.

==== Cycling ====
- Grand Tours:
  - Giro d'Italia:
    - Stage 9: (gold) Matthew Goss (AUS) (Team HTC–Columbia) 4h 08' 17" (silver) Filippo Pozzato (ITA) (Team Katusha) s.t. (bronze) Tyler Farrar (USA) (Garmin–Transitions) s.t.
      - General classification: (1) Alexander Vinokourov (KAZ) (Astana) 33h 09' 43" (2) Cadel Evans (AUS) (BMC Racing Team) + 1' 12" (3) Vincenzo Nibali (ITA) (Liquigas–Doimo) + 1' 33"
- Tour of California:
  - Stage 2: (gold) Brett Lancaster (AUS) (Cervélo TestTeam) 4h 38' 48" (silver) Peter Sagan (SVK) (Liquigas–Doimo) s.t. (bronze) Lars Boom (NED) (Rabobank) s.t.
    - General classification: (1) Lancaster 8h 43' 24" (2) Sagan + 4" (3) Karl Menzies (AUS) (UnitedHealthcare–Maxxis) + 4"

==== Ice hockey ====
- Men's World Championship in Germany:
  - Group E in Cologne: (teams in **bold** advance to the quarterfinals, teams in ~~strike~~ are eliminated)
    - **Finland** 5–2 Slovakia
    - ~~Belarus~~ 2–1 **Denmark**
      - Standings: **Russia** 12 points (4 games), Finland 9 (4), Denmark 6 (5), Belarus 5 (5), Germany 4 (4), Slovakia 3 (4).
  - Group F in Mannheim: (teams in **bold** advance to the quarterfinals, teams in ~~strike~~ are eliminated)
    - Norway 3–2 **Switzerland**
    - Czech Republic 3–1 ~~Latvia~~
      - Standings: **Sweden**, Switzerland 9 points (4 games), **Canada**, Czech Republic 6 (4), Norway 6 (5), Latvia 3 (5).
- Memorial Cup in Brandon, Manitoba:
  - Round robin:
    - Windsor Spitfires 6, Calgary Hitmen 2
      - Standings (after 2 matches): Windsor Spitfires 4 points, Brandon Wheat Kings, Calgary Hitmen 2, Moncton Wildcats 0.

=== May 16, 2010 (Sunday) ===
==== Auto racing ====
- Formula One:
  - Monaco Grand Prix in Monte Carlo, Monaco:
    - (1) Mark Webber (AUS) (Red Bull–Renault) (2) Sebastian Vettel (GER) (Red Bull-Renault) (3) Robert Kubica (POL) (Renault)
      - Drivers' championship standings (after 6 of 19 races): (1) Webber & Vettel 78 points (3) Fernando Alonso (ESP) (Ferrari) 75
      - Constructors' championship standings: (1) Red Bull 156 (2) Ferrari 136 (3) McLaren 129
- NASCAR Sprint Cup Series:
  - Autism Speaks 400 in Dover, Delaware:
    - (1) (Nevada) Kyle Busch (Toyota, Joe Gibbs Racing) (2) (Virginia) Jeff Burton (Chevrolet, Richard Childress Racing) (3) (Wisconsin) Matt Kenseth (Ford, Roush Fenway Racing)
      - Drivers' championship standings (after 12 of 36 races): (1) (California) Kevin Harvick (Chevrolet, Richard Childress Racing) 1768 points (2) Busch 1699 (3) Kenseth 1642
- V8 Supercars:
  - Winton V8 Supercar Event at Winton Motor Raceway, Benalla, Victoria:
    - Race 12: (1) James Courtney (AUS) (Ford Falcon) (2) Craig Lowndes (AUS) (Holden Commodore) (3) Lee Holdsworth (AUS) (Holden Commodore)
      - Drivers' championship standings (after 12 of 26 races): (1) Courtney 1467 points (2) Jamie Whincup (AUS) (Holden Commodore) 1353 (3) Lowndes 1245

==== Badminton ====
- Thomas & Uber Cup in Kuala Lumpur, Malaysia:
  - Thomas Cup:
    - Final: **China** 3–0 Indonesia
      - China win the Cup for the fourth straight time and eighth overall.

==== Basketball ====
- (United States) NBA Playoffs (best-of-7 series):
  - Eastern Conference Finals:
    - Game 1: Boston Celtics 92, Orlando Magic 88. Celtics lead series 1–0.

==== Cricket ====
- ICC Men's World Twenty20 in West Indies:
  - Final in Bridgetown, Barbados:
    - Australia 147/6 (20 overs); **England** 148/3 (17 overs). **England win by 7 wickets.**
- ICC Women's World Twenty20 in West Indies:
  - Final in Bridgetown, Barbados:
    - **Australia** 106/8 (20 overs); New Zealand 103/6 (20 overs). **Australia win by 3 runs.**

==== Cycling ====
- Grand Tours:
  - Giro d'Italia:
    - Stage 8: (gold) Chris Anker Sørensen (DEN) (Team Saxo Bank) 4h 50' 48" (silver) Simone Stortoni (ITA) (Colnago–CSF Inox) + 30" (bronze) Xavier Tondó (ESP) (Cervélo TestTeam) + 36"
      - General classification: (1) Alexander Vinokourov (KAZ) (Astana) 29h 01' 26" (2) Cadel Evans (AUS) (BMC Racing Team) + 1' 12" (3) Vincenzo Nibali (ITA) (Liquigas–Doimo) + 1' 33"
- Tour of California:
  - Stage 1: (gold) Mark Cavendish (GBR) (Team HTC–Columbia) 4h 04' 36" (silver) Juan José Haedo (Team Saxo Bank) (ARG) + 4" (bronze) Alexander Kristoff (NOR) (BMC Racing Team) + 6"

==== Equestrianism ====
- Show jumping:
  - Grand Prix de la ville de la Baule, La Baule-Escoublac (CSIO 5*): (gold) McLain Ward (USA) on Sapphire (silver) Mario Deslauriers (USA) on Urico (bronze) Jesus Garmendia Echevarria (ESP) on Lord du Mont Milon
  - German show jumping derby (de:Deutsches Spring-Derby), Hamburg: (gold) Carsten-Otto Nagel (GER) on Lex Lugar (silver) Heiko Schmidt (GER) on Coverlady (bronze) Bernardo Alves (BRA) on Quentin

==== Football (soccer) ====
- (Argentina) Argentine Primera División – Clausura, final matchday:
  - (9) Huracán 1–2 (1) Argentinos Juniors
  - (14) Colón 1–4 (2) Estudiantes (LP)
    - Final standings: Argentinos Juniors 41 points, Estudiantes 40, Godoy Cruz 37.
    - Argentinos Juniors win the championship for the third time.
- (Italy) Serie A, final matchday: (teams in **bold** qualify for the Champions League, teams in italics qualify for Europa League)
  - (19) Siena 0–1 (1) **Internazionale**
  - (13) Chievo 0–2 (2) **Roma**
  - (4) **Sampdoria** 1–0 (6) Napoli
  - (18) Atalanta 1–2 (5) Palermo
    - Final standings: Internazionale 82 points, Roma 80, **Milan** 70, Sampdoria 67, Palermo 65, Napoli 59, Juventus 55.
    - Internazionale win the championship for the fifth straight time and 18th overall.
- (Spain) La Liga, final matchday: (teams in **bold** qualify for the Champions League, teams in italics qualify for Europa League)
  - (1) **Barcelona** 4–0 (16) Valladolid
  - (18) Málaga 1–1 (2) **Real Madrid**
    - Final standings: Barcelona 99 points, Real Madrid 96, **Valencia** 71, **Sevilla** 63, Mallorca 62, Getafe 58.
    - Barcelona win the championship for the 20th time.
- (Switzerland) Swiss Super League, final matchday: (teams in **bold** qualify for the Champions League, teams in italics qualify for Europa League)
  - (2) **Young Boys** 0–2 (1) **Basel**
    - Final standings: Basel 80 points, Young Boys 77, Grasshopper 65, Luzern 58.
    - Basel win the championship for the 13th time.
- (Turkey) Süper Lig, final matchday: (teams in **bold** qualify for the Champions League, teams in italics qualify for Europa League)
  - (1) **Fenerbahçe** 1–1 (5) Trabzonspor
  - (2) **Bursaspor** 2–1 (4) Beşiktaş
    - Final standings: Bursaspor 75 points, Fenerbahçe 74, Galatasaray, Beşiktaş 64, Trabzonspor 57.
    - Bursaspor win the championship for the first time.
- (Andorra) Copa Constitució Final in Aixovall:
  - **UE Sant Julià** 1–0 UE Santa Coloma
    - UE Sant Julià win the Cup for the second time.
- (Austria) Austrian Cup Final in Klagenfurt:
  - Wiener Neustadt 0–1 **Sturm Graz**
    - Sturm Graz win the Cup for the fourth time.
- Taça de Portugal Final in Jamor:
  - Chaves 1–2 **Porto**
    - Porto win the Cup for the 19th time.
- (Russia) Russian Cup Final in Rostov-na-Donu:
  - Sibir Novosibirsk 0–1 **Zenit Saint Petersburg**
    - Zenit Saint Petersburg win the Cup for the second time.
- (Ukraine) Ukrainian Cup Final in Kharkiv:
  - **Tavriya Simferopol** 3–2 (a.e.t.) Metalurh Donetsk
    - Tavriya Simferopol win the Cup for the first time.

==== Golf ====
- PGA Tour:
  - Valero Texas Open in San Antonio, Texas:
    - Winner: Adam Scott (AUS) 274 (−14)
      - Scott wins his seventh PGA Tour title.
- European Tour:
  - Open Calla Millor Mallorca in Spain:
    - Winner: Peter Hanson (SWE) 274 (−6)^{PO}
      - Hanson wins his third European Tour title.
- LPGA Tour:
  - Bell Micro LPGA Classic in Mobile, Alabama:
    - Winner: Se Ri Pak (KOR) 203 (−13)^{PO}
      - Pak wins her 25th LPGA Tour title.
- Champions Tour:
  - Regions Charity Classic in Hoover, Alabama:
    - Winner: Dan Forsman (USA) 196 (−20)
      - Forsman wins his second Champions Tour title.

==== Ice hockey ====
- Men's World Championship in Germany:
  - Group E in Cologne: (teams in **bold** advance to the quarterfinals, teams in ~~strike~~ are eliminated)
    - Denmark 1–6 **Russia**
    - Germany 1–2 (OT) ~~Belarus~~
      - Standings: Russia 12 points (4 games), Finland 6 (3), Denmark 6 (4), Germany 4 (4), Slovakia 3 (3), Belarus 2 (4).
  - Group F in Mannheim: (teams in **bold** advance to the quarterfinals)
    - Latvia 5–0 Norway
    - **Sweden** 3–1 Canada
      - Standings: **Switzerland** 9 points (3 games), Sweden 9 (4), Canada 6 (4), Czech Republic 3 (3), Latvia, Norway 3 (4).
  - Relegation Round:
    - France 0–4 United States
    - Italy 2–1 Kazakhstan
      - Standings (after 2 games): United States 6 points, France, Italy 3, Kazakhstan 0.
- Stanley Cup playoffs (best-of-7 series):
  - Western Conference Finals:
    - Game 1: (2) Chicago Blackhawks 2, (1) San Jose Sharks 1. Blackhawks lead series 1–0.
  - Eastern Conference Finals:
    - Game 1: (7) Philadelphia Flyers 6, (8) Montreal Canadiens 0. Flyers lead series 1–0.
- Memorial Cup in Brandon, Manitoba:
  - Round robin:
    - Brandon Wheat Kings 4, Moncton Wildcats 0
      - Standings: Windsor Spitfires, Calgary Hitmen 2 points (1 match), Brandon Wheat Kings 2 (2), Moncton Wildcats 0 (2).

==== Motorcycle racing ====
- Superbike:
  - Kyalami Superbike World Championship round in Midrand, South Africa:
    - Race 1: (1) Michel Fabrizio (ITA) (Ducati 1098R) (2) Carlos Checa (ESP) (Ducati 1098R) (3) Leon Haslam (GBR) (Suzuki GSX-R1000)
    - Race 2: (1) Haslam (2) Jonathan Rea (GBR) (Honda CBR1000RR) (3) Max Biaggi (ITA) (Aprilia RSV 4)
      - Riders' championship standings (after 6 of 13 rounds): (1) Haslam 222 points (2) Biaggi 207 (3) Rea & Checa 141
      - Manufacturers' championship standings: (1) Suzuki 222 points (2) Aprilia 213 (3) Ducati 185
- Supersport:
  - Kyalami Supersport World Championship round in Midrand, South Africa:
    - (1) Eugene Laverty (IRL) (Honda CBR600RR) (2) Kenan Sofuoğlu (TUR) (Honda CBR600RR) (3) Chaz Davies (GBR) (Triumph Daytona 675)
      - Riders' championship standings (after 6 of 13 rounds): (1) Sofuoğlu 117 points (2) Laverty 116 (3) Joan Lascorz (ESP) (Kawasaki Ninja ZX-6R) 112
      - Manufacturers' championship standings: (1) Honda 145 points (2) Kawasaki 112 (3) Triumph 81

==== Rugby union ====
- (England) Guinness Premiership playoffs:
  - Semi-finals:
    - Northampton Saints 19–21 **Saracens**
    - **Leicester Tigers** 15–6 Bath

==== Tennis ====
- ATP World Tour:
  - Mutua Madrileña Madrid Open in Madrid, Spain:
    - Final: **Rafael Nadal** (ESP) def. Roger Federer (SUI) 6–4, 7–6(5)
      - Nadal wins his 39th career title and his 18th Masters title, the most by any male player; overtaking Andre Agassi in the process.
- WTA Tour:
  - Mutua Madrileña Madrid Open in Madrid, Spain:
    - Final: **Aravane Rezaï** (FRA) def. Venus Williams (USA) 6–2, 7–5
      - Rezaï wins her third career title and first Premier event.

=== May 15, 2010 (Saturday) ===
==== Auto racing ====
- Nationwide Series:
  - Heluva Good! 200 in Dover, Delaware: (1) (Nevada) Kyle Busch (Toyota; Joe Gibbs Racing) (2) (Indiana) Ryan Newman (Chevrolet; Phoenix Racing) (3) (Missouri) Jamie McMurray (Chevrolet; JR Motorsports)
    - Drivers' championship standings (after 11 of 35 races): (1) (Michigan) Brad Keselowski (Dodge; Penske Racing) 1766 points (2) Busch 1755 (3) (California) Kevin Harvick (Chevrolet; Kevin Harvick Incorporated) 1702
- V8 Supercars:
  - Winton V8 Supercar Event at Winton Motor Raceway, Benalla, Victoria:
    - Race 11: (1) James Courtney (AUS) (Ford Falcon) (2) Craig Lowndes (AUS) (Holden Commodore) (3) Jamie Whincup (AUS) (Holden Commodore)
      - Drivers' championship standings (after 11 of 26 races): (1) Whincup 1320 points (2) Courtney 1317 (3) Lowndes 1107

==== Badminton ====
- Thomas & Uber Cup in Kuala Lumpur, Malaysia:
  - Uber Cup:
    - Final: China 1–3 **South Korea**
      - Korea win the Cup for the first time and stop China's streak of six successive wins.

==== Cycling ====
- Grand Tours:
  - Giro d'Italia:
    - Stage 7: (gold) Cadel Evans (AUS) (BMC Racing Team) 5h 13' 37" (silver) Damiano Cunego (ITA) (Lampre–Farnese Vini) + 2" (bronze) Alexander Vinokourov (KAZ) (Astana) + 2"
      - General classification: (1) Vinokourov 24h 09' 42" (2) Evans + 1' 12" (3) David Millar (GBR) (Garmin–Transitions) + 1' 29"

==== Equestrianism ====
- Show jumping:
  - Global Champions Tour:
    - 2nd Competition in Hamburg: (gold) Lauren Hough (USA) on Quick Study (silver) Edwina Alexander (AUS) on Itot du Château (bronze) Laura Kraut (USA) on Cedric
      - Standings (after 2 of 9 competitions): (1) Marcus Ehning (GER) 66 points, (2) Marco Kutscher (GER) 65 (3) Kraut 54

==== Football (soccer) ====
- (Czech Republic) Gambrinus liga, final matchday: (teams in **bold** qualify for the Champions League, teams in italics qualify for Europa League)
  - (1) **Sparta Prague** 1–0 (4) Teplice
  - (9) Příbram 1–1 (2) Baník Ostrava
  - (3) Jablonec 2–0 (12) Dynamo České Budějovice
    - Final standings: Sparta Prague 62 points, Jablonec 61, Baník Ostrava 60 points, Teplice 55.
    - Sparta Prague win the national championship for the 35th time.
- (France) Ligue 1, final matchday: (teams in **bold** qualify for the Champions League, teams in italics qualify for Europa League)
  - (1) **Marseille** 2–0 (20) Grenoble
  - (7) Lorient 2–1 (2) Lille
  - (3) **Lyon** 2–0 (18) Le Mans
  - (16) Sochaux 1–2 (4) **Auxerre**
  - (11) Paris Saint-Germain 1–3 (5) Montpellier
  - (14) Lens 4–3 (6) Bordeaux
    - Final standings: Marseille 78 points, Lyon 72, Auxerre 71, Lille 70, Montpellier 69, Bordeaux 64.
    - Marseille win the championship for the tenth time.
- (Israel) Israeli Premier League, final matchday: (teams in **bold** qualify for the Champions League, teams in italics qualify for Europa League)
  - (4) Bnei Yehuda 1–1 (1) Maccabi Haifa
  - (5) Beitar Jerusalem 1–2 (2) **Hapoel Tel Aviv**
    - Final standings: Hapoel Tel Aviv 49 points (goal difference +61), Maccabi Haifa 49 (GD +56), Maccabi Tel Aviv 34, Bnei Yehuda 31.
    - Hapoel Tel Aviv win the championship for the 13th time.
- (Poland) Ekstraklasa, final matchday: (teams in **bold** qualify for the Champions League, teams in italics qualify for Europa League)
  - (1) **Lech Poznań** 2–0 (6) Zagłębie Lubin
  - (2) Wisła Kraków 1–1 (16) Odra Wodzisław
  - (7) Korona Kielce 3–0 (3) Ruch Chorzów
  - (4) Legia Warsaw 2–2 (5) GKS Bełchatów
    - Final standings: Lech Poznań 65 points, Wisła Kraków 62, Ruch Chorzów 53, Legia Warsaw 52.
    - Lech Poznań win the championship for the sixth time.
- (Romania) Liga I, matchday 33 of 34: (teams in **bold** qualify for the Champions League, teams in italics qualify for Europa League)
  - (1) **CFR Cluj** 2–1 (12) Internațional Curtea de Argeș
    - Standings: CFR Cluj 66 points (33 matches), Unirea Urziceni 60 (32).
    - CFR Cluj win the championship for the second time.
- (Spain) La Liga, final matchday: (teams in **bold** qualify for the Champions League, teams in italics qualify for Europa League)
  - (12) Almería 2–3 (4) **Sevilla**
  - (5) Mallorca 2–0 (11) Espanyol
  - (9) Atlético Madrid 0–3 (6) Getafe
  - (15) Zaragoza 3–3 (7) Villarreal
    - Standings (after 38 matches): **Barcelona** 96 points (37 matches), **Real Madrid** 95 (37), **Valencia** 68 (37), Sevilla 63, Mallorca 62, Getafe 58, Villarreal 56.
- (Uruguay) Uruguayan Primera División Finals, first leg:
  - Nacional 0–1 Peñarol
- (Belgium) Belgian Cup Final in Brussels:
  - **Gent** 3–0 Cercle Brugge
    - Gent win the Cup for the third time.
- (Cyprus) Cypriot Cup Final in Larnaca:
  - APOEL 1–2 **Apollon**
    - Apollon win the Cup for the sixth time.
- (England) FA Cup Final in London:
  - **Chelsea** 1–0 Portsmouth
    - Chelsea win the Cup for the sixth time.
- (Germany) DFB-Pokal Final in Berlin:
  - Werder Bremen 0–4 **Bayern Munich**
    - Bayern Munich win the Cup for the 15th time.
- (Germany) Frauen DFB-Pokal Final in Cologne:
  - **FCR 2001 Duisburg** 1–0 FF USV Jena
    - FCR 2001 Duisburg win the Cup for the third time.
- (Lithuania) Lithuanian Cup Final in Kaunas:
  - **Ekranas Panevėžys** 2–1 Vėtra Vilnius
    - Ekranas Panevėžys win the Cup for the fourth time.
- (Scotland) Scottish Cup Final in Glasgow:
  - Ross County 0–3 **Dundee United**
    - Dundee United win the Cup for the second time.
    - Motherwell qualify for the Europa League.

==== Handball ====
- EHF Women's Champions League Final, second leg: (first leg score in parentheses)
  - CS Oltchim Râmnicu Vâlcea (Romania) 31–32 (21–28) (Denmark) **Viborg HK**. Viborg HK win 60–52 on aggregate.
    - Viborg HK win the title for the third time.

==== Horse racing ====
- U.S. Triple Crown:
  - Preakness Stakes in Baltimore: (gold) Lookin at Lucky (trainer: Bob Baffert; jockey: Martín García) (silver) First Dude (trainer: Dale L. Romans; jockey: Ramon A. Dominguez) (bronze) Jackson Bend (trainer: Nick Zito; jockey: Mike E. Smith)
    - Lookin at Lucky pulls an upset victory in the second race of the Triple Crown. 2010 Kentucky Derby winner Super Saver's loss assures the continuation of horse racing's longest losing streak of 32 years; Affirmed last won the elusive Triple Crown in 1978.

==== Ice hockey ====
- Men's World Championship in Germany:
  - Group E in Cologne: (teams in **bold** advance to the quarterfinals)
    - **Russia** 3–2 Germany
      - Standings (after 3 games): Russia 9 points, Denmark, Finland 6, Germany, Slovakia 3, Belarus 0.
  - Group F in Mannheim:
    - Switzerland 3–2 Norway
      - Standings (after 3 games): Switzerland 9 points, Canada, Sweden 6, Norway, Czech Republic 3, Latvia 0.
  - Relegation Round:
    - United States 10–0 Kazakhstan
    - Italy 1–2 France
- Memorial Cup in Brandon, Manitoba:
  - Round robin:
    - Calgary Hitmen 5, Moncton Wildcats 4

==== Rugby union ====
- 2011 Rugby World Cup qualifying:
  - Asian Five Nations: (teams in ~~strike~~ are eliminated)
    - Kazakhstan 7–101 Japan in Tokyo
      - Standings: Japan 18 points (3 matches), Hong Kong 12 (3), ~~Arabian Gulf~~ 10 (4), Kazakhstan 7 (3), ~~South Korea~~ 1 (3).
- Celtic League playoffs:
  - Semi-finals:
    - **Leinster** (Ireland) 16–6 (Ireland) Munster
- (France) Top 14 playoffs:
  - Semi-finals:
    - Toulon 29–35 (aet) **Clermont** in Saint-Étienne

==== Taekwondo ====
- European Championships in Saint Petersburg, Russia:
  - Men:
    - −87 kg: (gold) Carlo Molfetta (ITA) (silver) Agustin Bata (FRA) (bronze) Jon García Aguado (ESP) (bronze) Ivan Nikitin (RUS)
    - +87 kg: (gold) Tavakgul Bayramov (AZE) (silver) Zakaria Asidah (DEN) (bronze) Mickael Borot (FRA) (bronze) Alexandros Nikolaidis (GRE)
  - Women:
    - −73 kg: (gold) Anastasia Baryshnikova (RUS) (silver) Sandra Lorenzo Rodelas (GER) (bronze) Nusa Rajher (SLO) (bronze) Gwladys Épangue (FRA)
    - +73 kg: (gold) Rosana Simon Alamo (ESP) (silver) Anne Caroline Graffe (FRA) (bronze) Iwona Kosiorek (POL) (bronze) Bianca Walkden (GBR)

=== May 14, 2010 (Friday) ===
==== Athletics ====
- IAAF Diamond League:
  - Qatar Athletic Super Grand Prix in Doha, Qatar:
    - Men:
      - 100m: Asafa Powell (JAM) 9.81
      - 800m: David Rudisha (KEN) 1:43.00
      - 5000m: Eliud Kipchoge (KEN) 12:51.22
      - 400m hurdles: Bershawn Jackson (USA) 48.66
      - 3000m steeplechase: Ezekiel Kemboi (KEN) 8:06.28
      - Triple jump: Alexis Copello (CUB) 17.47 m
      - Shot put: Christian Cantwell (USA) 21.82 m
    - Women:
      - 200m: Kerron Stewart (JAM) 22.34
      - 400m: Allyson Felix (USA) 50.15
      - 1500m: Nancy Jebet Langat (KEN) 4:01.64
      - 100m hurdles: Lolo Jones (USA) 12.63
      - High jump: Blanka Vlašić (CRO) 1.98 m
      - Pole vault: Silke Spiegelburg (GER) 4.70 m
      - Discus throw: Yarelis Barrios (CUB) 64.90 m
      - Javelin throw: Maria Abakumova (RUS) 68.89 m

==== Badminton ====
- Thomas & Uber Cup in Kuala Lumpur, Malaysia:
  - Thomas Cup:
    - Semi-finals:
      - **China** 3–0 Malaysia
      - Japan 1–3 **Indonesia**

==== Basketball ====
- Atlanta Hawks head coach Mike Woodson is dismissed, after the team's second-round playoff exit to the Orlando Magic. (NBA)

==== Cricket ====
- ICC Men's World Twenty20 in West Indies:
  - Semi-finals in Gros Islet, St Lucia:
    - Pakistan 191/6 (20 overs); **Australia** 197/7 (19.5 overs). **Australia win by 3 wickets.**
- ICC Women's World Twenty20 in West Indies:
  - Semi-finals in Gros Islet, St Lucia:
    - **New Zealand** 180/5 (20 overs); West Indies 124/8 (20 overs). **New Zealand win by 56 runs.**

==== Cycling ====
- Grand Tours:
  - Giro d'Italia:
    - Stage 6: (gold) Matthew Lloyd (AUS) (Omega Pharma–Lotto) 4h 24' 20" (silver) Rubens Bertogliati (SUI) (Androni Giocattoli) + 1' 06" (bronze) Danilo Hondo (GER) (Lampre–Farnese Vini) + 1' 15"
      - General classification: (1) Vincenzo Nibali (ITA) (Liquigas–Doimo) 18h 55' 38" (2) Ivan Basso (ITA) (Liquigas–Doimo) + 13" (3) Valerio Agnoli (ITA) (Liquigas–Doimo) + 20"

==== Equestrianism ====
- Show jumping
  - Meydan FEI Nations Cup:
    - FEI Nations Cup of France in La Baule-Escoublac (CSIO 5*): (gold) France (Penelope Leprevost on Topinambour, Michel Robert on Kellemoi de Pepita, Olivier Guillon on Lord de Theize, Kevin Staut on Kraque Boom) (silver) United States (Richard Spooner on Cristallo, Hillary Dobbs on Quincy B, Mario Deslauriers on Urico, McLain Ward on Sapphire) (bronze) United Kingdom (Michael Whitaker on Amai, Scott Brash on Intertoy Z, Mark Armstrong on Thesaura, Peter Charles on Pom d'Ami) (bronze) Germany (Alois Pollmann-Schweckhorst on Chacco Blue, Alexander Hufenstuhl on Lacapo, Rebecca Golasch on Lassen Peak, Philipp Weishaupt on Souvenir)
  - FEI Nations Cup Promotional League:
    - FEI Nations Cup of Austria in Linz-Ebelsberg (CSIO 3*): (gold) United Kingdom (silver) Australia (bronze) Belgium
    - FEI Nations Cup of Greece in the Markopoulo Olympic Equestrian Centre (CSIO 2*-W): (gold) Italy (silver) Greece (bronze) Turkey (bronze) Germany
      - Standings (after 4 of 11 competitions): (1) Australia 25 points (2) Belgium 25 (3) Italy 24

==== Ice hockey ====
- Men's World Championship in Germany:
  - Group E in Cologne:
    - Slovakia 0–6 Denmark
    - Finland 2–0 Belarus
      - Standings: Russia 6 points (2 matches), Denmark, Finland 6 (3), Germany 3 (2), Slovakia 3 (3), Belarus 0 (3).
  - Group F in Mannheim:
    - Canada 12–1 Norway
    - Sweden 4–2 Latvia
      - Standings: Switzerland 6 points (2 matches), Canada, Sweden 6 (3), Czech Republic 3 (2), Norway 3 (3), Latvia 0 (3).
- Stanley Cup playoffs (best-of-7 series):
  - Eastern Conference Semifinals:
    - Game 7: (7) Philadelphia Flyers 4, (6) Boston Bruins 3. **Flyers win series 4–3.**
      - The Flyers become only the third team in NHL history, and the first since the 1975 New York Islanders, to come back from being down 3–0 to win a playoff series.
- Memorial Cup in Brandon, Manitoba:
  - Round robin:
    - Windsor Spitfires 9, Brandon Wheat Kings 3

==== Rugby union ====
- 2011 Rugby World Cup qualifying:
  - Asian Five Nations: (teams in ~~strike~~ are eliminated)
    - ~~Arabian Gulf~~ 21–19 ~~South Korea~~ in Dubai, UAE
      - The Arabian Gulf win their final Test match. The team and governing body will both disband, with the member nations forming their own governing bodies.
      - Standings: Japan 12 points (2 matches), Hong Kong 12 (3), Arabian Gulf 10 (4), Kazakhstan 7 (2), Korea 1 (3)
- Celtic League playoffs:
  - Semi-finals:
    - **Ospreys** (Wales) 20–5 (Scotland) Glasgow Warriors
- (France) Top 14 playoffs:
  - Semi-finals:
    - **Perpignan** 21–13 Toulouse in Montpellier

==== Taekwondo ====
- European Championships in Saint Petersburg, Russia:
  - Men:
    - −74 kg: (gold) Ridvan Baygut (TUR) (silver) Manuel Mark (AUT) (bronze) Mokdad Ounis (GER) (bronze) Elvin Mammadov (AZE)
    - −80 kg: (gold) Aaron Cock (GBR) (silver) Nikolaos Tzellos (GRE) (bronze) Mamedy Doucara (FRA) (bronze) Lukasz Smigaj (POL)
  - Women:
    - −62 kg: (gold) Haby Niare (GER) (silver) Margarita Michailidou (GRE) (bronze) Kristina Khafizova (RUS) (bronze) Estefania Hernandez Garcia (ESP)
    - −67 kg: (gold) Sarah Stevenson (GBR) (silver) Nur Tatar (TUR) (bronze) Helena Fromm (GER) (bronze) Marlène Harnois (FRA)

=== May 13, 2010 (Thursday) ===
==== Badminton ====
- Thomas & Uber Cup in Kuala Lumpur, Malaysia:
  - Uber Cup:
    - Semi-finals:
      - **China** 3–0 Indonesia
      - **South Korea** 3–1 Japan

==== Baseball ====
- The Kansas City Royals fire manager Trey Hillman; Ned Yost will move from the Royals' front office to serve as interim replacement for the rest of the season.

==== Basketball ====
- (United States) NBA Playoffs (best-of-7 series):
  - Eastern Conference Semifinals:
    - Game 6: Boston Celtics 94, Cleveland Cavaliers 85. **Celtics win series 4–2.**

==== Cricket ====
- ICC Men's World Twenty20 in West Indies:
  - Semi-finals in Gros Islet, St Lucia:
    - Sri Lanka 128/6 (20 overs); **England** 132/3 (16 overs). **England win by 7 wickets.**
- ICC Women's World Twenty20 in West Indies:
  - Semi-finals in Gros Islet, St Lucia:
    - India 119/5 (20 overs); **Australia** 123/3 (18.5 overs). **Australia win by 7 wickets.**

==== Cycling ====
- Grand Tours:
  - Giro d'Italia:
    - Stage 5: (gold) Jérôme Pineau (FRA) (Quick-Step) 3h 45' 59" (silver) Julien Fouchard (FRA) (Cofidis) s.t. (bronze) Yukiya Arashiro (JPN) (Bbox Bouygues Telecom) s.t.
      - General classification: (1) Vincenzo Nibali (ITA) (Liquigas–Doimo) 14h 30' 03" (2) Ivan Basso (ITA) (Liquigas–Doimo) + 13" (3) Valerio Agnoli (ITA) (Liquigas–Doimo) + 20"

==== Darts ====
- Premier League round 14 in Nottingham, England: (players in **bold** advance to semi-finals)
  - Terry Jenkins (ENG) 5–8 **James Wade** (ENG)
  - Ronnie Baxter (ENG) 2–8 Raymond van Barneveld (NED)
  - **Simon Whitlock** (AUS) 8–2 **Mervyn King** (ENG)
  - **Phil Taylor** (ENG) 8–1 Adrian Lewis (ENG)
    - High checkout: Whitlock 130
      - Final standings: Taylor 26 points, Whitlock 16, Wade 14, King, Baxter 13, Lewis 11, Barneveld 11, Jenkins 8.

==== Football (soccer) ====
- Copa Libertadores Quarterfinals, first leg:
  - Internacional (Brazil) 1–0 (Argentina) Estudiantes
- Austrian Bundesliga, final matchday: (teams in **bold** qualify for the Champions League, teams in italics qualify for Europa League)
  - (4) Sturm Graz 0–2 (1) **Red Bull Salzburg**
  - (2) Austria Wien 2–0 (8) Ried
  - (6) Mattersburg 1–3 (3) Rapid Wien
    - Final standings: Red Bull Salzburg 76 points, Austria Wien 75, Rapid Wien 73.
    - Red Bull Salzburg win the championship for the second straight time and sixth time overall.
- Serbian SuperLiga, matchday 29 of 30: (teams in **bold** qualify for the Champions League, teams in italics qualify for Europa League)
  - (3) OFK Beograd 0–3 (1) **Partizan**
  - (2) Red Star Belgrade 1–3 (13) BSK Borča
    - Standings: Partizan 75 points, Red Star 68, OFK Beograd 50, Spartak Zlatibor Voda 49.
    - Partizan win the championship for the third straight time and the 22nd time overall (including former Yugoslavia and Serbia&Montenegro).
- (Denmark) Danish Cup Final in Copenhagen:
  - Midtjylland 0–2 (a.e.t.) **Nordsjælland**
    - Nordsjælland win the Cup for the first time.
- Liechtenstein Cup Final in Vaduz:
  - **Vaduz** 1–1 (4–2 pen.) Eschen/Mauren
    - Vaduz win the Cup for the 39th time and the 13th in succession.

==== Ice hockey ====
- Men's World Championship in Germany:
  - Group A in Cologne: (teams in **bold** advance to the Qualification Round)
    - **Russia** 3–1 **Belarus**
    - Kazakhstan 1–5 **Slovakia**
      - Final standings: Russia 9 points, Slovakia 6, Belarus 3, Kazakhstan 0.
  - Group C in Mannheim: (teams in **bold** advance to the Qualification Round)
    - France 1–5 **Norway**
    - **Sweden** 1–2 **Czech Republic**
      - Final standings: Sweden, Norway, Czech Republic 6 points, France 0.

==== Taekwondo ====
- European Championships in Saint Petersburg, Russia:
  - Men:
    - −63 kg: (gold) Konstantinos Konstantinidis (GER) (silver) Nikola Jovanović (SRB) (bronze) Vladislav Arventil (MDA) (bronze) Cem Ulugnoyan (TUR)
    - −68 kg: (gold) Servet Tazegül (TUR) (silver) Filip Grgic (CRO) (bronze) Dennis Beckers (NLD) (bronze) Vasily Nikitin (RUS)
  - Women:
    - −53 kg: (gold) Floriane Liborio (FRA) (silver) Jennifer Agren (SWE) (bronze) Jade Jones (GER) (bronze) Manuela Bezzola (SUI)
    - −57 kg: (gold) Bat-El Gatterer (ISR) (silver) Yuliya Podolyan (UKR) (bronze) Deborah Louz (NLD) (bronze) Veronica Calabrese (ITA)

=== May 12, 2010 (Wednesday) ===
==== Badminton ====
- Thomas & Uber Cup in Kuala Lumpur, Malaysia:
  - Thomas Cup:
    - Quarter-finals:
      - **China** 3–0 South Korea
      - Denmark 2–3 **Malaysia**
      - Germany 1–3 **Japan**
      - India 0–3 **Indonesia**
  - Uber Cup:
    - Quarter-finals:
      - **China** 3–0 India
      - **Indonesia** 3–0 Malaysia
      - Russia 1–3 **South Korea**
      - Denmark 1–3 **Japan**

==== Cycling ====
- Grand Tours:
  - Giro d'Italia:
    - Stage 4: (gold) Liquigas–Doimo 36' 37" (silver) Team Sky + 13" (bronze) Team HTC–Columbia + 21"
      - General classification: (1) Vincenzo Nibali (ITA) (Liquigas–Doimo) 10h 44' 00" (2) Ivan Basso (ITA) (Liquigas–Doimo) + 13" (3) Valerio Agnoli (ITA) (Liquigas–Doimo) + 20"

==== Football (soccer) ====
- UEFA Europa League Final in Hamburg:
  - Fulham (England) 1–2 (a.e.t.) (Spain) **Atlético Madrid**
    - Diego Forlán's goal four minutes from the end of extra time gives Atlético Madrid their first European title since the now-defunct UEFA Cup Winners' Cup in 1962 and their first trophy of any kind in 14 years.
- Copa Libertadores Quarterfinals, first leg:
  - Cruzeiro (Brazil) 0–2 (Brazil) São Paulo
  - Flamengo (Brazil) 2–3 Universidad de Chile
- AFC Champions League Round of 16:
  - East Asia:
    - Kashima Antlers (Japan) 0–1 (South Korea) **Pohang Steelers**
    - Adelaide United (Australia) 2–3 (a.e.t.) (South Korea) **Jeonbuk Hyundai Motors**
  - West Asia:
    - **Zob Ahan** (Iran) 1–0 (Iran) Mes Kerman
    - **Al-Hilal** (Saudi Arabia) 3–0 (Uzbekistan) Bunyodkor
- AFC Cup Round of 16:
  - Sriwijaya (Indonesia) 1–4 (Thailand) **Thai Port**
  - **SHB Đà Nẵng** (Vietnam) 4–3 (a.e.t.) (Vietnam) Bình Dương
  - **Al-Qadsia** (Kuwait) 2–1 (India) Churchill Brothers
  - Al-Kuwait 1–1 (4–5 pen.) (Syria) **Al-Ittihad**

==== Ice hockey ====
- Men's World Championship in Germany:
  - Group B in Mannheim: (teams in **bold** advance to the Qualification Round)
    - Italy 2–5 **Latvia**
    - **Canada** 1–4 **Switzerland**
      - Final standings: Switzerland 9 points, Canada 6, Latvia 3, Italy 0.
  - Group D in Cologne: (teams in **bold** advance to the Qualification Round)
    - **Denmark** 1–3 **Germany**
    - **Finland** 3–2 United States
      - Final standings: Finland 6 points, Germany, Denmark 5, United States 2.
- Stanley Cup playoffs (all series best-of-7):
  - Eastern Conference Semifinals:
    - Game 7: (8) Montreal Canadiens 5, (4) Pittsburgh Penguins 2. **Canadiens win series 4–3.**
    - Game 6: (7) Philadelphia Flyers 2, (6) Boston Bruins 1. Series tied 3–3.

==== Taekwondo ====
- European Championships in Saint Petersburg, Russia:
  - Men:
    - −54 kg: (gold) Seyfula Magomedov (RUS) (silver) Remzi Basakbugday (TUR) (bronze) Moti Lugasi (ISR) (bronze) Sergej Kolb (GER)
    - −58 kg: (gold) Joel Bonilla Gonzalez (ESP) (silver) Alan Nogaev (RUS) (bronze) Stipe Jarloni (CRO) (bronze) Marios Tsourdinis (GRE)
  - Women:
    - −46 kg: (gold) Rukiye Yildirim (TUR) (silver) Elaia Torrontegui Ronco (ESP) (bronze) Yuliya Volkova (UKR) (bronze) Sumeyye Karaahmet (GER)
    - −49 kg: (gold) Lucija Zaninovic (CRO) (silver) Yasmina Aziez (FRA) (bronze) Kristina Kim (RUS) (bronze) Hanna Zajc (SWE)

=== May 11, 2010 (Tuesday) ===
==== Badminton ====
- Thomas & Uber Cup in Kuala Lumpur, Malaysia:
  - Thomas Cup: (teams in **bold** advance to quarter-finals)
    - Group A: **China** 4–1 **South Korea**
      - Final standings: China 2 points, Korea 1, Peru 0.
    - Group B: **Malaysia** 2–3 **Japan**
      - Final standings: Japan 2 points, Malaysia 1, Nigeria 0.
    - Group C: **Denmark** 4–1 **Germany**
      - Final standings: Denmark 2 points, Germany 1, Poland 0.
    - Group D: **India** 4–1 Australia
      - Final standings: **Indonesia** 2 points, India 1, Australia 0.
  - Uber Cup: (teams in **bold** advance to quarter-finals)
    - Group A: **China** 5–0 **Malaysia**
      - Final standings: China 2 points, Malaysia 1, United States 0.
    - Group B: **Indonesia** 5–0 **Denmark**
      - Final standings: Indonesia 2 points, Denmark 1, Australia 0.
    - Group C: **Japan** 5–0 **Russia**
      - Final standings: Japan 2 points, Russia 1, Germany 0.
    - Group D: **South Korea** 4–1 **India**
      - Final standings: Korea 2 points, India 1, South Africa 0.

==== Basketball ====
- (United States) NBA Playoffs (best-of-7 series):
  - Eastern Conference Semifinals:
    - Game 5: Boston Celtics 120, Cleveland Cavaliers 88. Celtics lead series 3–2.

==== Chess ====
- World Championship in Sofia, Bulgaria:
  - Game 12: Viswanathan Anand (IND) (Black) def. Veselin Topalov (BUL) (White).
    - Anand wins series 6½–5½ and retains his title.

==== Cricket ====
- ICC Men's World Twenty20 in West Indies:
  - Group F: (teams in **bold** advance to semi-finals)
    - India 163/5 (20 overs); **Sri Lanka** 167/5 (20 overs) in Gros Islet, St Lucia. **Sri Lanka win by 5 wickets.**
    - West Indies 105 (19 overs); **Australia** 109/4 (16.2 overs) in Gros Islet, St Lucia. **Australia win by 6 wickets.**
      - Final standings: Australia 6 points, Sri Lanka 4, West Indies 2, India 0.

==== Football (soccer) ====
- Copa Libertadores Quarterfinals, first leg:
  - Guadalajara (Mexico) 3–0 (Paraguay) Libertad
- AFC Champions League Round of 16:
  - East Asia:
    - **Seongnam Ilhwa Chunma** (South Korea) 3–0 (Japan) Gamba Osaka
    - **Suwon Samsung Bluewings** (South Korea) 2–0 (China) Beijing Guoan
  - West Asia:
    - **Al-Gharafa** (Qatar) 1–0 (Uzbekistan) Pakhtakor
    - **Al-Shabab** (Saudi Arabia) 3–2 (Iran) Esteghlal
- AFC Cup Round of 16:
  - South China (Hong Kong) 1–3 (Bahrain) **Al-Riffa**
  - Al-Rayyan (Qatar) 1–1 (2–4 pen.) (Thailand) **Muangthong United**
  - **Al-Karamah** (Syria) 1–0 (Uzbekistan) Nasaf Qarshi
  - **Kazma** (Kuwait) 1–1 (6–5 pen.) (Jordan) Shabab Al-Ordon
- (Estonia) Estonian Cup Final in Tallinn:
  - Flora 0–3 **Levadia**
    - Levadia win the Cup for the sixth time.
- Israel State Cup Final in Ramat Gan:
  - **Hapoel Tel Aviv** 3–1 Bnei Yehuda
    - Hapoel Tel Aviv win the Cup for the 13th time.
- (Slovakia) Slovak Cup Final in Michalovce:
  - **Slovan Bratislava** 6–0 Spartak Trnava
    - Slovan Bratislava win the Cup for the fourth time.

==== Ice hockey ====
- Men's World Championship in Germany:
  - Group A in Cologne: (teams in **bold** advance to the Qualification Round)
    - **Russia** 4–1 Kazakhstan
    - **Belarus** 2–4 Slovakia
      - Standings (after 2 matches): Russia 6 points, Slovakia, Belarus 3, Kazakhstan 0.
  - Group C in Mannheim: (teams in **bold** advance to the Qualification Round)
    - **Czech Republic** 2–3 Norway
    - **Sweden** 3–2 France
      - Standings (after 2 matches): Sweden 6 points, Norway, Czech Republic 3, France 0.
- Stanley Cup playoffs (best-of-7 series):
  - Western Conference Semifinals:
    - Game 6: (2) Chicago Blackhawks 5, (3) Vancouver Canucks 1. **Blackhawks win series 4–2.**

=== May 10, 2010 (Monday) ===
==== Badminton ====
- Thomas & Uber Cup in Kuala Lumpur, Malaysia:
  - Thomas Cup: (teams in **bold** advance to quarter-finals, teams in ~~strike~~ are eliminated)
    - Group A: **South Korea** 5–0 ~~Peru~~
      - Standings: **China**, Korea 1 point (1 match), Peru 0 (2).
    - Group B: **Japan** 5–0 ~~Nigeria~~
      - Standings: **Malaysia**, Japan 1 point (1 match), Nigeria 0 (2).
    - Group C: **Germany** 5–0 ~~Poland~~
      - Standings: **Denmark**, Germany 1 point (1 match), Poland 0 (2).
    - Group D: **Indonesia** 4–1 India
      - Standings: Indonesia 2 points (2 matches), India, Australia 0 (1).
  - Uber Cup: (teams in **bold** advance to quarter-finals, teams in ~~strike~~ are eliminated)
    - Group A: **Malaysia** 5–0 ~~United States~~
      - Standings: **China**, Malaysia 1 point (1 match), United States 0 (2).
    - Group B: **Denmark** 3–2 ~~Australia~~
      - Standings: **Indonesia**, Denmark 1 point (1 match), Australia 0 (2).
    - Group C: **Russia** 4–1 ~~Germany~~
      - Standings: **Japan**, Russia 1 point (1 match), Germany 0 (2).
    - Group D: **India** 5–0 ~~South Africa~~
      - Standings: **South Korea**, India 1 point (1 match), South Africa 0 (2).

==== Basketball ====
- (United States) NBA Playoffs (all series best-of-7):
  - Eastern Conference Semifinals:
    - Game 4: Orlando Magic 98, Atlanta Hawks 84. **Magic win series 4–0.**
  - Western Conference Semifinals:
    - Game 4: Los Angeles Lakers 111, Utah Jazz 96. **Lakers win series 4–0.**

==== Cricket ====
- ICC Men's World Twenty20 in West Indies: (teams in **bold** advance to the semi-finals)
  - Group E:
    - **Pakistan** 148/7 (20 overs); South Africa 137/7 (20 overs) in Gros Islet, St Lucia. **Pakistan win by 11 runs.**
    - New Zealand 149/6 (20 overs); **England** 153/7 (19.1 overs) in Gros Islet, St Lucia. **England win by 3 wickets.**
      - Final standings: England 6 points, Pakistan, New Zealand, South Africa 2.
- ICC Women's World Twenty20 in West Indies: (teams in **bold** advance to the semi-finals)
  - Group B:
    - Pakistan 65/9 (20 overs); **New Zealand** 71/4 (8.2 overs) in Basseterre, St Kitts. **New Zealand win by 6 wickets.**
    - **India** 144/3 (20 overs); Sri Lanka 73/9 (20 overs) in Basseterre, St Kitts. **India win by 71 runs.**
      - Final standings: New Zealand 6 points, India 4, Sri Lanka 2, Pakistan 0.

==== Cycling ====
- Grand Tours:
  - Giro d'Italia:
    - Stage 3: (gold) Wouter Weylandt (BEL) (Quick-Step) 5h 00' 06" (silver) Graeme Brown (AUS) (Rabobank) s.t. (bronze) Robert Förster (GER) (Team Milram) s.t.
      - General classification: (1) Alexander Vinokourov (KAZ) (Astana) 10h 07' 18" (2) Richie Porte (AUS) (Team Saxo Bank) s.t. (3) David Millar (GBR) (Garmin–Transitions) + 1"

==== Football (soccer) ====
- (Armenia) Armenian Cup Final in Yerevan:
  - Pyunik 0–4 **Banants**
    - Banants win the Cup for the third time.

==== Ice hockey ====
- Men's World Championship in Germany:
  - Group B in Mannheim: (teams in **bold** advance to the Qualification Round)
    - **Switzerland** 3–0 Italy
    - Latvia 1–6 **Canada**
      - Standings (after 2 matches): Canada, Switzerland 6 points, Latvia, Italy 0.
  - Group D in Cologne: (teams in **bold** advance to the Qualification Round)
    - United States 1–2 (OT) **Denmark**
    - Germany 0–1 Finland
      - Standings (after 2 matches): Denmark 5 points, Finland 3, Germany, United States 2.
- Stanley Cup playoffs (all series best-of-7):
  - Eastern Conference Semifinals:
    - Game 6: (8) Montreal Canadiens 4, (4) Pittsburgh Penguins 3. Series tied 3–3.
    - Game 5: (7) Philadelphia Flyers 4, (6) Boston Bruins 0. Bruins lead series 3–2.

=== May 9, 2010 (Sunday) ===
==== Auto racing ====
- Formula One:
  - Spanish Grand Prix in Montmeló, Spain:
    - (1) Mark Webber (AUS) (Red Bull–Renault) (2) Fernando Alonso (ESP) (Ferrari) (3) Sebastian Vettel (GER) (Red Bull-Renault)
      - Drivers' championship standings (after 5 of 19 rounds): (1) Jenson Button (GBR) (McLaren–Mercedes) 70 points (2) Alonso 67 (3) Vettel 60
      - Constructors' championship standings: (1) McLaren 119 points (2) Ferrari 116 (3) Red Bull 113
- World Rally Championship:
  - Rally New Zealand in Auckland, New Zealand:
    - (1) Jari-Matti Latvala (FIN) / Miikka Anttila (FIN) (Ford Focus RS WRC 09) (2) Sébastien Ogier (FRA) / Julien Ingrassia (FRA) (Citroën C4 WRC) (3) Sébastien Loeb (FRA) / Daniel Elena (MON) (Citroën C4 WRC)
      - Drivers' championship standings (after 5 of 13 rounds): (1) Loeb 108 points (2) Latvala 72 (3) Mikko Hirvonen (FIN) (Ford Focus RS WRC 09) 64

==== Badminton ====
- Thomas & Uber Cup in Kuala Lumpur, Malaysia:
  - Thomas Cup:
    - Group A: China 5–0 Peru
    - Group B: Malaysia 5–0 Nigeria
    - Group C: Denmark 5–0 Poland
    - Group D: Indonesia 5–0 Australia
  - Uber Cup:
    - Group A: China 5–0 United States
    - Group B: Indonesia 5–0 Australia
    - Group C: Japan 4–1 Germany
    - Group D: South Korea 5–0 South Africa

==== Baseball ====
- Dallas Braden throws the 19th perfect game in Major League Baseball history in the Oakland Athletics' 4–0 win over the Tampa Bay Rays.

==== Basketball ====
- Euroleague Final Four in Paris, France:
  - Third-place playoff: (bronze) CSKA Moscow (Russia) 90–88 (Serbia) Partizan Belgrade
  - Final: (gold) Regal FC Barcelona (Spain) 86–68 (silver) (Greece) Olympiacos Piraeus
    - Barcelona win the title for the second time.
    - Juan Carlos Navarro is named the Final Four MVP.
- (United States) NBA Playoffs (all series best-of-7):
  - Eastern Conference Semifinals:
    - Game 4: Boston Celtics 97, Cleveland Cavaliers 87. Series tied 2–2.
  - Western Conference Semifinals:
    - Game 4: Phoenix Suns 107, San Antonio Spurs 101. **Suns win series 4–0.**

==== Chess ====
- World Championship in Sofia, Bulgaria:
  - Game 11: Viswanathan Anand (IND) (White) drew with Veselin Topalov (BUL) (Black)
    - Series tied 5½–5½.

==== Cricket ====
- ICC Men's World Twenty20 in West Indies:
  - Group F:
    - West Indies 169/6 (20 overs); India 155/9 (20 overs) in Bridgetown, Barbados. **West Indies win by 14 runs.**
    - Australia 168/5 (20 overs); Sri Lanka 87 (16.2 overs) in Bridgetown, Barbados. **Australia win by 81 runs.**
      - Standings (after 2 matches): Australia 4 points, Sri Lanka, West Indies 2, India 0.
- ICC Women's World Twenty20 in West Indies: (teams in **bold** advance to the semi-finals)
  - Group A: (teams in **bold** advance to the semi-finals)
    - England 141/6 (20 overs); South Africa 85 (17 overs) in Basseterre, St Kitts. **England win by 56 runs.**
    - **Australia** 133/7 (20 overs); **West Indies** 124/7 (20 overs) in Basseterre, St Kitts. **Australia win by 9 runs.**
      - Final standings: Australia 6 points, West Indies 4, England 2, South Africa 0.

==== Cycling ====
- Grand Tours:
  - Giro d'Italia:
    - Stage 2: (gold) Tyler Farrar (USA) (Garmin–Transitions) 4h 56' 46" (silver) Matthew Goss (AUS) (Team HTC–Columbia) s.t. (bronze) Fabio Sabatini (ITA) (Liquigas–Doimo) s.t.
      - General classification: (1) Cadel Evans (AUS) (BMC Racing Team) 5h 07' 09" (2) Farrar + 1" (3) Alexander Vinokourov (KAZ) (Astana) + 3"

==== Football (soccer) ====
- 2011 FIFA Women's World Cup qualification (UEFA):
  - Group 1: ~~Croatia~~ 1–2 Serbia
    - Standings: France 18 points (6 matches), Iceland 15 (6), Serbia 7 (6), Northern Ireland, Estonia 3 (4), Croatia 1 (6)
- CAF Champions League Qualification Second round, second leg: (first leg score in parentheses)
  - **Heartland** (Nigeria) 3–1 (1–1) (South Africa) Supersport United. Heartland win 4–2 on aggregate.
  - **TP Mazembe** (Democratic Republic of the Congo) 3–0 (1–0) (Mali) Djoliba. TP Mazembe win 4–0 on aggregate.
  - Atlético Petróleos Luanda (Angola) 2–1 (0–2) (Algeria) **JS Kabylie**. JS Kabylie win 3–2 on aggregate.
  - **Ismaily** (Egypt) 3–1 (1–0) (Sudan) Al-Hilal Omdurman. Ismaily win 4–1 on aggregate.
  - **Al-Ahly** (Egypt) 3–0 (0–2) (Libya) Ittihad. Al-Ahly win 3–2 on aggregate.
- CAF Confederation Cup Second round, second leg: (first leg score in parentheses)
  - **CAPS United** (Zimbabwe) 2–0 (1–2) (Nigeria) Warri Wolves. CAPS United win 3–2 on aggregate.
  - **Enyimba** (Nigeria) 3–0 (0–3) (Democratic Republic of the Congo) AS Vita Club. 3–3 on aggregate; Enyimba win 5–4 on penalties.
- (England) Premier League, final matchday: (teams in **bold** qualify for the Champions League, teams in italics qualify for Europa League, ranking prior to the matches in parentheses)
  - (1) **Chelsea** 8–0 (15) Wigan Athletic
  - (2) **Manchester United** 4–0 (10) Stoke
  - (3) **Arsenal** 4–0 (12) Fulham
  - (18) Burnley 4–2 (4) **Tottenham Hotspur**
    - Final standings: Chelsea 86 points, Manchester United 85, Arsenal 75, Tottenham Hotspur 70, Manchester City 67, Aston Villa 64, Liverpool 63.
    - Chelsea win the championship for the fourth time.
- (Portugal) Primeira Liga, final matchday: (teams in **bold** qualify for the Champions League, teams in italics qualify for Europa League, ranking prior to the matches in parentheses)
  - (1) **Benfica** 2–1 (11) Rio Ave
  - (6) Nacional 1–1 (2) **Braga**
  - (5) Vitória de Guimarães 1–2 (7) Marítimo
    - Final standings: Benfica 76 points, Sporting de Braga 71, Porto 68, Sporting CP 48, Marítimo, Vitória de Guimarães 41, Nacional 39.
    - Benfica win the championship for the 32nd time.
- (Scotland) Scottish Premier League, final matchday: (teams in **bold** qualify for the Champions League, teams in italics qualify for Europa League, ranking prior to the matches in parentheses)
  - (1) **Rangers** 3–3 (4) Motherwell
  - (6) Heart of Midlothian 1–2 (2) **Celtic**
  - (3) Dundee United 0–2 (5) Hibernian
    - Final standings: Rangers 87 points, Celtic 81, Dundee United 63, Hibernian 54, Motherwell 53, Heart of Midlothian 48.
    - Rangers win their 53rd championship.
    - Motherwell will enter Europa League if Dundee United win the Scottish Cup Final.
- (Albania) Albanian Cup Final in Tirana:
  - **Besa Kavajë** 2–1 (aet) Vllaznia Shkodër
    - Besa Kavajë win the Cup for the second time.
- (Switzerland) Swiss Cup Final in Basel:
  - **FC Basel** 6–0 FC Lausanne-Sport
    - FC Basel win the Cup for the tenth time.

==== Golf ====
- PGA Tour:
  - The Players Championship in Ponte Vedra Beach, Florida:
    - Winner: Tim Clark (RSA) 272 (−16)
      - Clark wins his first PGA Tour title.
- European Tour:
  - BMW Italian Open in Turin, Italy:
    - Winner: Fredrik Andersson Hed (SWE) 268 (−16)
      - Andersson Hed wins his first European Tour title at the 245th attempt.

==== Ice hockey ====
- Men's World Championship in Germany:
  - Group A in Cologne:
    - Belarus 5–2 Kazakhstan
    - Slovakia 1–3 Russia
  - Group C in Mannheim:
    - Czech Republic 6–2 France
    - Norway 2–5 Sweden
- Stanley Cup playoffs (best-of-7 series):
  - Western Conference Semifinals:
    - Game 5: (3) Vancouver Canucks 4, (2) Chicago Blackhawks 1. Blackhawks lead series 3–2.

==== Motorcycle racing ====
- Superbike:
  - Monza Superbike World Championship round in Monza, Italy:
    - Race 1: (1) Max Biaggi (ITA) (Aprilia RSV 4) (2) James Toseland (GBR) (Yamaha YZF-R1) (3) Cal Crutchlow (GBR) (Yamaha YZF-R1)
    - Race 2: (1) Biaggi (2) Leon Haslam (GBR) (Suzuki GSX-R1000) (3) Troy Corser (AUS) (BMW S1000RR)
      - Riders' championship standings (after 5 of 13 rounds): (1) Haslam 181 points (2) Biaggi 178 (3) Jonathan Rea (GBR) (Honda CBR1000RR) & Carlos Checa (ESP) (Ducati 1098R) 110
      - Manufacturers' championship standings: (1) Aprilia 184 points (2) Suzuki 181 (3) Ducati 149
- Supersport:
  - Monza Supersport World Championship round in Monza, Italy:
    - (1) Eugene Laverty (IRL) (Honda CBR600RR) (2) Kenan Sofuoğlu (TUR) (Honda CBR600RR) (3) Joan Lascorz (ESP) (Kawasaki Ninja ZX-6R)
      - Riders' championship standings (after 5 of 13 rounds): (1) Lascorz 101 points (2) Sofuoğlu 97 (3) Laverty 91
      - Manufacturers' championship standings: (1) Honda 120 points (2) Kawasaki 101 (3) Triumph 65

==== Tennis ====
- ATP World Tour:
  - BMW Open in Munich, Germany:
    - Final: **Mikhail Youzhny** (RUS) def. Marin Čilić (CRO) 6–3, 4–6, 6–4
      - Youzhny wins the sixth title of his career.
  - Serbia Open in Belgrade, Serbia:
    - Final: **Sam Querrey** (USA) def. John Isner (USA) 3–6, 7–6(4), 6–4
      - Querrey wins his second title of the year and the fourth title of his career.
  - Estoril Open in Estoril, Portugal:
    - Final: **Albert Montañés** (ESP) def. Frederico Gil (POR) 6–2, 6–7(4), 7–5
      - Montañés wins the fourth title of his career and the second successive title of this event.

=== May 8, 2010 (Saturday) ===
==== Auto racing ====
- NASCAR Sprint Cup Series:
  - Southern 500 in Darlington, South Carolina:
    - (1) (Virginia) Denny Hamlin (Toyota, Joe Gibbs Racing) (2) (Missouri) Jamie McMurray (Chevrolet, Earnhardt Ganassi Racing) (3) (Nevada) Kurt Busch (Dodge, Penske Racing)
      - Drivers' championship standings (after 11 of 36 races): (1) (California) Kevin Harvick (Chevrolet, Richard Childress Racing 1622 points (2) (California) Jimmie Johnson (Chevrolet, Hendrick Motorsports) 1512 (3) (Nevada) Kyle Busch (Toyota, Joe Gibbs Racing) 1509

==== Basketball ====
- (United States) NBA Playoffs (all series best-of-7):
  - Eastern Conference Semifinals:
    - Game 3: Orlando Magic 105, Atlanta Hawks 75. Magic lead series 3–0.
  - Western Conference Semifinals:
    - Game 3: Los Angeles Lakers 111, Utah Jazz 110. Lakers lead series 3–0.

==== Cricket ====
- ICC Men's World Twenty20 in West Indies:
  - Group E:
    - New Zealand 133/7 (20 overs); Pakistan 132/7 (20 overs) in Bridgetown, Barbados. **New Zealand win by 1 run.**
    - England 168/7 (20 overs); South Africa 129 (19 overs) in Bridgetown, Barbados. **England win by 39 runs.**
      - Standings (after 2 matches): England 4 points, New Zealand, South Africa 2, Pakistan 0.
- ICC Women's World Twenty20 in West Indies: (teams in **bold** advance to the semifinals)
  - Group B:
    - Pakistan 104/6 (20 overs); India 106/1 (16.4 overs) in Basseterre, St Kitts. **India win by 9 wickets.**
    - **New Zealand** 154/7 (20 overs); Sri Lanka 107/8 (20 overs) in Basseterre, St Kitts. **New Zealand win by 47 runs.**
      - Standings (after 2 matches): New Zealand 4 points, India, Sri Lanka 2, Pakistan 0.

==== Cycling ====
- Grand Tours:
  - Giro d'Italia:
    - Stage 1: (gold) Bradley Wiggins (GBR) (Team Sky) 10' 18" (silver) Brent Bookwalter (USA) (BMC Racing Team) + 2" (bronze) Cadel Evans (AUS) (BMC Racing Team) + 2"

==== Equestrianism ====
- Show jumping:
  - Global Champions Tour:
    - 1st Competition in Valencia: (gold) Timothée Anciaume (FRA) on Lamm de Fetan (silver) Marcus Ehning (GER) on Sabrina (bronze) Jos Lansink (BEL) on Valentina van't Heike

==== Football (soccer) ====
- CAF Champions League Qualification Second round, second leg: (first leg score in parentheses)
  - Zanaco (Zambia) 2–2 (0–1) (Algeria) **ES Sétif**. ES Sétif win 3–2 on aggregate.
  - Gaborone United (Botswana) 0–0 (1–4) (Zimbabwe) **Dynamos**. Dynamos win 4–1 on aggregate.
  - Al-Merreikh (Sudan) 1–1 (0–3) (Tunisia) **Espérance ST**. Espérance ST win 4–1 on aggregate.
- CAF Confederation Cup Second round, second leg: (first leg score in parentheses)
  - DC Motema Pembe (Democratic Republic of the Congo) 0–0 (0–1) (Niger) **ASFAN**. ASFAN win 1–0 on aggregate.
  - **Primeiro de Agosto** (Angola) 0–0 (2–1) (Cameroon) Cotonsport. Primeiro de Agosto win 2–1 on aggregate.
  - **Haras El Hodood** (Egypt) 5–1 (1–2) (Tanzania) Simba S.C. Haras El Hodood win 6–3 on aggregate.
  - **CS Sfaxien** (Tunisia) 1–0 (1–1) (Egypt) Petrojet. CS Sfaxien win 2–1 on aggregate.
  - Stade Malien (Mali) 0–0 (0–2) (Morocco) **FUS Rabat**. FUS Rabat win 2–0 on aggregate.
- (Belgium) Belgian First Division, final matchday: (teams in **bold** qualify for the Champions League, teams in italics qualify for Europa League, ranking prior to the matches in parentheses)
  - (1) **Anderlecht** 2–1 (4) Sint-Truiden
  - (3) **Gent** 6–2 (2) Club Brugge
  - (6) Zulte Waregem 1–2 (5) Kortrijk
    - Standings: Anderlecht 59 points, Gent, Club Brugge 41, Sint-Truiden 34, Kortrijk 33, Zulte-Waregem 28.
    - Anderlecht win the championship for the 30th time.
- (Germany) Fußball-Bundesliga, final matchday: (teams in **bold** qualify for the Champions League, teams in italics qualify for Europa League, ranking prior to the matches in parentheses)
  - (18) Hertha BSC 1–3 (1) **Bayern Munich**
  - (10) Mainz 05 0–0 (2) **Schalke 04**
  - (3) **Werder Bremen** 1–1 (7) Hamburger SV
  - (13) Borussia Mönchengladbach 1–1 (4) Bayer Leverkusen
  - (14) SC Freiburg 3–1 (5) Borussia Dortmund
  - (11) 1899 Hoffenheim 1–1 (6) VfB Stuttgart
    - Final standings: Bayern Munich 70 points, Schalke 65, Werder Bremen 61, Leverkusen 59, Dortmund 57, Stuttgart 55.
    - Bayern Munich win the championship for the 22nd time.
- (Slovakia) Slovak Superliga, matchday 32 of 33: (teams in **bold** qualify for the Champions League, teams in italics qualify for Europa League, ranking prior to the matches in parentheses)
  - (1) **Žilina** 4–0 (9) DAC Dunajská Streda
  - (2) Slovan Bratislava 2–0 (3) Dukla Banská Bystrica
    - Standings: MŠK Žilina 72 points, Slovan Bratislava 67, Dukla Banská Bystrica 55.
    - MŠK Žilina win the championship for the fifth time.
- (Northern Ireland) Irish Cup Final in Belfast:
  - **Linfield** 2–1 Portadown
    - Linfield win the Cup for the 40th time.
- (Slovenia) Slovenian Cup Final in Maribor:
  - Domžale 2–3 (AET) **Maribor**
    - Maribor win the Cup for the sixth time.

==== Handball ====
- EHF Women's Champions League Final, first leg:
  - Viborg HK (Denmark) 28–21 (Romania) CS Oltchim Râmnicu Vâlcea

==== Ice hockey ====
- Men's World Championship in Germany:
  - Group B in Mannheim:
    - Canada 5–1 Italy
    - Switzerland 3–1 Latvia
  - Group D in Cologne: Finland 1–4 Denmark
- Stanley Cup playoffs (all series best-of-7):
  - Eastern Conference Semifinals:
    - Game 5: (4) Pittsburgh Penguins 2, (8) Montreal Canadiens 1. Penguins lead series 3–2.
  - Western Conference Semifinals:
    - Game 5: (1) San Jose Sharks 2, (5) Detroit Red Wings 1. **Sharks win series 4–1.**

==== Mixed martial arts ====
- UFC 113 in Montreal:
  - Middleweight bout: Alan Belcher (USA) def. Patrick Côté (CAN) via submission (rear naked choke)
  - Heavyweight bout: Matt Mitrione (USA) def. Kimbo Slice (BAH) via TKO (punches)
  - Lightweight bout: Jeremy Stephens (USA) def. Sam Stout (CAN) via split decision (30–27, 29–28, 28–29)
  - Welterweight bout: Josh Koscheck (USA) def. Paul Daley (ENG) via unanimous decision (30–27, 30–27, 30–27)
  - Light Heavyweight Championship bout: Mauricio Rua (BRA) def. Lyoto Machida (BRA) (c) via KO (punches)

==== Rugby union ====
- 2011 Rugby World Cup qualifying:
  - Asian Five Nations: (teams in ~~strike~~ are eliminated)
    - Japan 60–5 ~~Arabian Gulf~~ in Tokyo
    - Hong Kong 19–15 Kazakhstan
      - Standings: Japan 12 points (2 matches), Hong Kong 12 (3), Kazakhstan 7 (2), Arabian Gulf 5 (3), ~~South Korea~~ 0 (2)
  - European Nations Cup Champions Playoff Series:
    - Round 4: Lithuania 16–27 Ukraine in Šiauliai
      - Lithuania lose a Test for the first time in four years, ending their record streak of Test wins at 18.
- (France) Top 14 playoffs, quarterfinal:
  - **Toulouse** 35–12 Castres

==== Tennis ====
- WTA Tour:
  - Internazionali BNL d'Italia in Rome, Italy:
    - Final: **María José Martínez Sánchez** (ESP) def. Jelena Janković (SRB) 7–6(5), 7–5
      - Martínez Sánchez wins her third career title, and becomes the first Spanish winner of a top-tier WTA Tour title since Conchita Martínez at Berlin in 2000.
  - Estoril Open in Estoril, Portugal:
    - Final: **Anastasija Sevastova** (LAT) def. Arantxa Parra Santonja (ESP) 6–2, 7–5
      - Sevastova wins her first career title, and becomes the first Latvian winner of a WTA Tour title since Larisa Neiland in 1993.

==== Triathlon ====
- ITU World Championships in Seoul, South Korea:
  - Men: (gold) Jan Frodeno (GER) (silver) Courtney Atkinson (AUS) (bronze) Brad Kahlefeldt (AUS)
    - Standings (after 2 of 7 events): (1) Alexander Brukhankov (RUS) 1326 points (2) Bevan Docherty (NZL) 1301 (3) Dmitry Polyanski (RUS) 1175
  - Women: (gold) Daniela Ryf (SUI) (silver) Barbara Riveros Diaz (CHI) (bronze) Emma Moffatt (AUS)
    - Standings (after 2 of 7 events): (1) Riveros Diaz 1540 points (2) Moffatt 1370 (3) Andrea Hewitt (NZL) 1326

=== May 7, 2010 (Friday) ===
==== Auto racing ====
- Nationwide Series:
  - Diamond Hill Plywood 200 in Darlington, South Carolina
    - (1) (Virginia) Denny Hamlin (Toyota, Joe Gibbs Racing) (2) (Nevada) Kyle Busch (Toyota, Joe Gibbs Racing) (3) (Missouri) Jamie McMurray (Chevrolet, JR Motorsports)
      - Drivers' championship standings (after 10 of 35 races): (1) (Michigan) Brad Keselowski (Dodge, Penske Racing) 1615 points (2) Busch 1560 (3) (California) Kevin Harvick (Chevrolet, Kevin Harvick Incorporated) 1552

==== Baseball ====
- Major League Baseball:
  - In the Chicago Cubs' 14–7 win over the Cincinnati Reds, the Cubs' Starlin Castro becomes the first player ever to drive in 6 runs in his MLB debut.
  - The game between the Baltimore Orioles and the Minnesota Twins was postponed due to rain, the first rainout in the history of Target Field and the first postponement of an outdoor MLB game in Minnesota since September 20, 1980.
  - Jamie Moyer becomes the oldest pitcher in MLB history to pitch a complete-game shutout as the Philadelphia Phillies beat the Atlanta Braves, 7–0. Moyer did the feat at the age of 47 years, 170 days, respectively surpassing Phil Niekro (46 years, 188 days) and Satchel Paige (46 years, 75 days) as the oldest pitcher and oldest non-knuckleballer to accomplish this feat. (Major League Baseball via Philadelphia Phillies)

==== Basketball ====
- Euroleague Final Four in Paris, France:
  - Semifinals:
    - **Regal FC Barcelona** (Spain) 64–54 (Russia) CSKA Moscow
    - Partizan Belgrade (Serbia) 80–83 (OT) (Greece) **Olympiacos Piraeus**
      - Barcelona and Olympiacos will play a re-match of 1997 final.
- (United States) NBA Playoffs (all series best-of-7):
  - Eastern Conference Semifinals:
    - Game 3: Cleveland Cavaliers 124, Boston Celtics 95. Cavaliers lead series 2–1.
  - Western Conference Semifinals:
    - Game 3: Phoenix Suns 110, San Antonio Spurs 96. Suns lead series 3–0.

==== Chess ====
- World Championship in Sofia, Bulgaria:
  - Game 10: Veselin Topalov (BUL) (White) drew with Viswanathan Anand (IND) (Black).
    - Series tied 5–5.

==== Cricket ====
- ICC Men's World Twenty20 in West Indies:
  - Group F:
    - Australia 184/5 (20 overs); India 135 (17.4 overs) in Bridgetown, Barbados. **Australia win by 49 runs.**
    - Sri Lanka 195/3 (20 overs); West Indies 138/8 (20 overs) in Bridgetown, Barbados. **Sri Lanka win by 57 runs.**
- ICC Women's World Twenty20 in West Indies: (teams in **bold** advance to the semi-finals)
  - Group A:
    - **Australia** 155 (19.3 overs); South Africa 131/7 (20 overs) in Basseterre, St Kitts. **Australia win by 24 runs.**
    - **West Indies** 122/8 (20 overs); England 120/9 (20 overs) in Basseterre, St Kitts. **West Indies win by 2 runs.**
      - Standings (after 2 matches): Australia, West Indies 4 points, England, South Africa 0.

==== Football (soccer) ====
- CAF Confederation Cup Second round, second leg: (first leg score in parentheses)
  - **CR Belouizdad** (Algeria) 2–0 (0–1) (Sudan) Amal Atbara. Belouizdad win 2–1 on aggregate.

==== Ice hockey ====
- Men's World Championship in Germany:
  - Group D in Gelsenkirchen: United States 1–2 (OT) Germany
    - In the highest-attended ice hockey game ever, Felix Schütz scores the winning goal 21 seconds into overtime.
- Stanley Cup playoffs (all series best-of-7):
  - Eastern Conference Semifinals:
    - Game 4: (7) Philadelphia Flyers 5, (6) Boston Bruins 4 (OT). Bruins lead series 3–1.
  - Western Conference Semifinals:
    - Game 4: (2) Chicago Blackhawks 7, (3) Vancouver Canucks 4. Blackhawks lead series 3–1.

==== Rugby union ====
- (France) Top 14 playoffs quarter-final:
  - **Clermont** 21–17 Racing Métro

=== May 6, 2010 (Thursday) ===
==== Basketball ====
- (United States) NBA Playoffs (best-of-7 series):
  - Eastern Conference Semifinals:
    - Game 2: Orlando Magic 112, Atlanta Hawks 98. Magic lead series 2–0.
- NBA season awards:
  - All-NBA Teams:
    - First Team:
      - F Kevin Durant, Oklahoma City Thunder (1st selection to an All-NBA team)
      - F LeBron James, Cleveland Cavaliers (6th selection)
      - C Dwight Howard, Orlando Magic (4th selection)
      - G Kobe Bryant, Los Angeles Lakers (12th selection)
      - G Dwyane Wade, Miami Heat (5th selection)
    - Second Team:
      - F Carmelo Anthony, Denver Nuggets (4th selection)
      - F Dirk Nowitzki, Dallas Mavericks (10th selection)
      - C Amar'e Stoudemire, Phoenix Suns (4th selection)
      - G Deron Williams, Utah Jazz (2nd selection)
      - G Steve Nash, Phoenix Suns (7th selection)
    - Third Team:
      - F Pau Gasol, Los Angeles Lakers (2nd selection)
      - F Tim Duncan, San Antonio Spurs (13th selection)
      - C Andrew Bogut, Milwaukee Bucks (1st selection)
      - G Joe Johnson, Atlanta Hawks (1st selection)
      - G Brandon Roy, Portland Trail Blazers (2nd selection)

==== Chess ====
- World Championship in Sofia, Bulgaria:
  - Game 9: Viswanathan Anand (IND) (White) drew with Veselin Topalov (BUL) (Black)
    - Series tied 4½–4½.

==== Cricket ====
- ICC Men's World Twenty20 in West Indies:
  - Group E:
    - Pakistan 147/9 (20 overs); England 148/4 (19.3 overs) in Bridgetown, Barbados. **England win by 6 wickets.**
    - South Africa 170/4 (20 overs); New Zealand 157/7 (20 overs) in Bridgetown, Barbados. **South Africa win by 13 runs.**
- ICC Women's World Twenty20 in West Indies:
  - Group B:
    - Sri Lanka 108 (19.3 overs); Pakistan 107 (20 overs) in Basseterre, St Kitts. **Sri Lanka win by 1 run.**
    - New Zealand 139/8 (20 overs); India 129/8 (20 overs) in Basseterre, St Kitts. **New Zealand win by 10 runs**.

==== Darts ====
- Premier League round 13 in Newcastle, England: (players in **bold** advance to semi-final, players in ~~strike~~ are eliminated)
  - Adrian Lewis (ENG) 7–7 Ronnie Baxter (ENG)
  - Mervyn King (ENG) 5–8 ~~Raymond van Barneveld~~ (NED)
  - James Wade (ENG) 4–8 Simon Whitlock (AUS)
  - ~~Terry Jenkins~~ (ENG) 5–8 **Phil Taylor** (ENG)
    - High checkout: King 130
      - Standings after 13 rounds: Taylor 24 points, Whitlock 14, King, Baxter 13, Wade 12, Lewis 11, Barneveld 9, Jenkins 8.

==== Football (soccer) ====
- Copa Libertadores Round of 16, second leg: (first leg score in parentheses)
  - **Internacional** (Brazil) 2–0 (1–3) (Argentina) Banfield. 3–3 on aggregate; Internacional win on away goals.
  - **Libertad** (Paraguay) 2–1 (0–0) (Colombia) Once Caldas. Libertad win 2–1 on aggregate.
  - **Universidad de Chile** 2–2 (1–0) (Peru) Alianza Lima. Universidad de Chile win 3–2 on aggregate.
- (Netherlands) KNVB Cup Final, second leg: (first leg score in parentheses)
  - Feyenoord 1–4 (0–2) **Ajax**. Ajax win 6–1 on aggregate.
    - Ajax win the Cup for the 18th time.

==== Ice hockey ====
- Stanley Cup playoffs (all series best-of-7):
  - Eastern Conference Semifinals:
    - Game 4: (8) Montreal Canadiens 3, (4) Pittsburgh Penguins 2. Series tied 2–2.
  - Western Conference Semifinals:
    - Game 4: (5) Detroit Red Wings 7, (1) San Jose Sharks 1. Sharks lead series 3–1.

=== May 5, 2010 (Wednesday) ===
==== Basketball ====
- (United States) NBA Playoffs (best-of-7 series):
  - Western Conference Semifinals:
    - Game 2: Phoenix Suns 110, San Antonio Spurs 102. Suns lead series 2–0.

==== Cricket ====
- ICC Men's World Twenty20 in West Indies: (teams in **bold** advance to the Super 8s)
  - Group A: **Australia** 141/7 (20 overs); Bangladesh 114 (18.4 overs) in Bridgetown, Barbados. **Australia win by 27 runs.**
    - Final standings: Australia 4 points, **Pakistan** 2, Bangladesh 0.
  - Group C: **South Africa** 139/7 (20 overs); Afghanistan 80 (16 overs) in Bridgetown, Barbados. **South Africa win by 59 runs.**
    - Final standings: **India** 4 points, South Africa 2, Afghanistan 0.
- ICC Women's World Twenty20 in West Indies:
  - Group A:
    - West Indies 175/5 (20 overs; Deandra Dottin 112*); South Africa 158/4 (20 overs) in Basseterre, St Kitts. **West Indies win by 17 runs.**
      - Dottin becomes the first player to hit a century in a women's Twenty20 International.
    - England 104 (17.3 overs); Australia 104 (19.4 overs) in Basseterre, St Kitts. **Match tied. Australia win the one-over eliminator.**

==== Football (soccer) ====
- Copa Libertadores Round of 16, second leg: (first leg score in parentheses)
  - **Estudiantes** (Argentina) 3–1 (1–0) (Mexico) San Luis. Estudiantes win 4–1 on aggregate.
  - Corinthians (Brazil) 2–1 (0–1) (Brazil) **Flamengo**. 2–2 on aggregate; Flamengo win on away goals.
  - Nacional (Uruguay) 0–3 (1–3) (Brazil) **Cruzeiro**. Cruzeiro win 6–1 on aggregate.
- (Denmark) Danish Superliga, matchday 31 of 33:
  - F.C. Copenhagen 3–0 HB Køge
    - Standings: **F.C. Copenhagen** 65 points, OB 53 (30 matches).
      - F.C. Copenhagen win the championship for the second straight time and eighth overall.
- (France) Ligue 1, matchday 36 of 38:
  - Marseille 3–1 Rennes
  - Lyon 2–1 Auxerre
  - Toulouse 0–2 Lille
    - Standings: **Marseille** 75 points, Lille, Auxerre 67, Lyon 65 (35 matches), Montpellier 63.
      - Marseille win the championship for the ninth time and the first since 1992.
- (Ukraine) Ukrainian Premier League, matchday 29 of 30:
  - Shakhtar Donetsk 1–0 Dinamo Kyiv
    - Standings (teams in **bold** qualify for the Champions League, teams in italics qualify for Europa League): **Shakhtar Donetsk** 74 points, **Dinamo Kyiv** 68, Metalist Kharkiv 59, Dnipro Dnipropetrovsk 53, Karpaty Lviv 49.
      - Shakhtar Donetsk win their fifth championship.
- (Bosnia and Herzegovina) Kup Bosne i Hercegovine Final, first leg:
  - Borac 1–1 Željezničar
- (Bulgaria) Bulgarian Cup Final in Lovech:
  - Chernomorets Pomorie 0–1 **Beroe**
    - Beroe win the Cup for the first time.
- (Croatia) Croatian Cup Final, second leg: (first leg score in parentheses)
  - Šibenik 0–2 (1–2) **Hajduk Split**. Hajduk Split win 4–1 on aggregate.
    - Hajduk Split win the Cup for the fifth time.
- (Italy) Coppa Italia Final in Rome:
  - **Internazionale** 1–0 Roma
    - Internazionale win the Cup for the sixth time, and complete the first leg of a possible treble.
- Serbian Cup Final in Belgrade:
  - **Red Star** 3–0 Vojvodina
    - Red Star win the national Cup (including former Yugoslavia and Serbia/Montenegro) for the 23rd time.
- (Turkey) Turkish Cup Final in Şanlıurfa:
  - Fenerbahçe 1–3 **Trabzonspor**
    - Trabzonspor win the Cup for the eighth time.

==== Ice hockey ====
- Stanley Cup playoffs (all series best-of-7):
  - Eastern Conference Semifinals:
    - Game 3: (6) Boston Bruins 4, (7) Philadelphia Flyers 1. Bruins lead series 3–0.
  - Western Conference Semifinals:
    - Game 3: (2) Chicago Blackhawks 5, (3) Vancouver Canucks 2. Blackhawks lead series 2–1.

=== May 4, 2010 (Tuesday) ===
==== Basketball ====
- (United States) NBA Playoffs (all series best-of-7):
  - Eastern Conference Semifinals:
    - Game 1: Orlando Magic 114, Atlanta Hawks 71. Magic lead series 1–0.
  - Western Conference Semifinals:
    - Game 2: Los Angeles Lakers 111, Utah Jazz 103. Lakers lead series 2–0.

==== Chess ====
- World Championship in Sofia, Bulgaria:
  - Game 8: Veselin Topalov (BUL) (White) def. Viswanathan Anand (IND) (Black)
    - Series tied 4–4.

==== Cricket ====
- ICC Men's World Twenty20 in West Indies: (teams in **bold** advance to the Super 8s)
  - Group B: Zimbabwe 84 (15.1 overs); **New Zealand** 36/1 (8.1 overs) in Guyana. **New Zealand win by 7 runs (D/L).**
    - Final standings: New Zealand 4 points, **Sri Lanka** 2, Zimbabwe 0.
  - Group D: **England** 120/8 (20 overs); Ireland 14/1 (3.3 overs) in Guyana. **Match abandoned; no result.**
    - Final standings: **West Indies** 4 points, England, Ireland 1.

==== Football (soccer) ====
- Copa Libertadores Round of 16, second leg: (first leg score in parentheses)
  - **São Paulo** (Brazil) 0–0 (0–0) (Peru) Universitario. 0–0 on aggregate; São Paulo win 3–1 on penalties.
  - Vélez Sarsfield (Argentina) 2–0 (0–3) (Mexico) **Guadalajara**. Guadalajara win 3–2 on aggregate.

==== Ice hockey ====
- Stanley Cup playoffs (all series best-of-7):
  - Eastern Conference Semifinals:
    - Game 3: (4) Pittsburgh Penguins 2, (8) Montreal Canadiens 0. Penguins lead series 2–1.
  - Western Conference Semifinals:
    - Game 3: (1) San Jose Sharks 4, (5) Detroit Red Wings 3 (OT). Sharks lead series 3–0.

=== May 3, 2010 (Monday) ===
==== Basketball ====
- (United States) NBA Playoffs (all series best-of-7):
  - Eastern Conference Semifinals:
    - Game 2: Boston Celtics 104, Cleveland Cavaliers 86. Series tied 1–1.
  - Western Conference Semifinals:
    - Game 1: Phoenix Suns 111, San Antonio Spurs 102. Suns lead series 1–0.
- In other NBA news, Chicago Bulls head coach Vinny Del Negro is dismissed, after the team's first-round playoff exit to the Cleveland Cavaliers. (NBA via Associated Press)

==== Chess ====
- World Championship in Sofia, Bulgaria:
  - Game 7: Viswanathan Anand (IND) (White) drew with Veselin Topalov (BUL) (Black)
    - Anand leads the series 4–3.

==== Cricket ====
- ICC Men's World Twenty20 in West Indies: (teams in **bold** advance to the Super 8s)
  - Group B: **Sri Lanka** 173/7 (20 overs; Mahela Jayawardene 100); Zimbabwe 29/1 (5/5 overs) in Guyana. **Sri Lanka win by 14 runs (D/L).**
    - Standings: Sri Lanka 2 points (2 matches), New Zealand 2 (1), Zimbabwe 0 (1).
  - Group D: England 191/5 (20 overs); **West Indies** 60/2 (5.5/6 overs) in Guyana. **West Indies win by 8 wickets (D/L).**
    - Standings: West Indies 4 points (2 matches), England, Ireland 0 (1).

==== Equestrianism ====
- Eventing:
  - Badminton Horse Trials at Badminton House, Gloucestershire, United Kingdom: (gold) Paul Tapner (AUS) on Inonothing 44.9 points (silver) Andreas Dibowski (GER) on Euroridings Butts Leon 49.5 (bronze) Daisy Berkeley (GBR) on Spring Along 50.4

==== Football (soccer) ====
- (England) FA Women's Cup Final in Nottingham:
  - Arsenal 2–3 (AET) **Everton**
    - Everton win the Cup for the second time, having previously won in 1989 as Leasowe Pacific.

==== Ice hockey ====
- Stanley Cup playoffs (all series best-of-7):
  - Eastern Conference Semifinals:
    - Game 2: (6) Boston Bruins 3, (7) Philadelphia Flyers 2. Bruins lead series 2–0.
  - Western Conference Semifinals:
    - Game 2: (2) Chicago Blackhawks 4, (3) Vancouver Canucks 2. Series tied 1–1.

==== Snooker ====
- World Championship in Sheffield, England:
  - Final (best of 35 frames):
    - **Neil Robertson** (AUS) def. Graeme Dott (SCO) 18–13
      - Robertson wins his fifth ranking title, becoming the third player from outside the United Kingdom to win the World Championship in the modern era.

=== May 2, 2010 (Sunday) ===
==== Auto racing ====
- World Touring Car Championship:
  - Race of Morocco:
    - Round 3: (1) Gabriele Tarquini (ITA) (SR-Sport; SEAT León) (2) Rob Huff (GBR) (Chevrolet; Chevrolet Cruze) (3) Tiago Monteiro (POR) (SR-Sport; SEAT León)
    - Round 4: (1) Andy Priaulx (GBR) (BMW Team RBM; BMW 320si) (2) Yvan Muller (FRA) (Chevrolet; Chevrolet Cruze) (3) Tom Coronel (NED) (SR-Sport; SEAT León)
      - Drivers' championship standings (after 4 of 22 rounds): (1) Tarquini 70 points (2) Muller 63 (3) Huff 46
      - Manufacturers' championship standings: (1) SEAT Customers Technology 133 points (2) Chevrolet 118 (3) BMW 93
- V8 Supercars:
  - City of Ipswich 300 in Queensland Raceway, Ipswich, Queensland:
    - Race 10: (1) James Courtney (AUS) (Ford Falcon) (2) Garth Tander (AUS) (Holden Commodore) (3) Shane van Gisbergen (NZL) (Ford Falcon)
      - Drivers' championship standings (after 10 of 26 races): (1) Jamie Whincup (AUS) (Holden Commodore) 1191 points (2) Courtney 1167 (3) Van Gisbergen 984

==== Basketball ====
- (United States) NBA Playoffs (all series best-of-7):
  - Eastern Conference First round:
    - Game 7: Atlanta Hawks 95, Milwaukee Bucks 74. **Hawks win series 4–3.**
  - Western Conference Semifinals:
    - Game 1: Los Angeles Lakers 104, Utah Jazz 99. Lakers lead series 1–0.
- NBA season awards:
  - Most Valuable Player: LeBron James, Cleveland Cavaliers
- EuroChallenge Final Four:
  - Third-place playoff: (bronze) Chorale Roanne Basket (France) 86–80 (Italy) Scavolini Spar Pesaro
  - Final: (gold) BG Göttingen (Germany) 83–75 (silver) (Russia) Krasnye Krylya Samara
    - BG Göttingen win their first European title.

==== Cricket ====
- ICC Men's World Twenty20 in West Indies: (teams in **bold** advance to the Super 8s)
  - Group C: **India** 186/5 (20 overs, Suresh Raina 101); South Africa 172/5 (20 overs) in Gros Islet, St Lucia. **India win by 14 runs**.
    - Standings: India 4 points (2 matches), South Africa, Afghanistan 0 (1).
  - Group A: Australia 191 (20 overs); Pakistan 157 (20 overs) in Gros Islet, St Lucia. **Australia win by 34 runs.**
    - Standings: Australia 2 points (1 match), Pakistan 2 (2), Bangladesh 0 (1).

==== Cycling ====
- UCI ProTour:
  - Tour de Romandie:
    - Stage 5: (gold) Alejandro Valverde (ESP) (Caisse d'Epargne) 3h 36' 19" (silver) Igor Antón (ESP) (Euskaltel–Euskadi) s.t. (bronze) Simon Špilak (SLO) (Lampre–Farnese Vini) s.t.
      - Final general classification: (1) Valverde 17h 37' 55" (2) Špilak + 11" (3) Denis Menchov (RUS) (Rabobank) + 21"

==== Football (soccer) ====
- OFC Champions League Final, second leg: (first leg score in parentheses)
  - Waitakere United 2–1 (0–3) (Papua New Guinea) **PRK Hekari United**. PRK Hekari United win 4–2 on aggregate.
    - PRK Hekari United become the first team from a country other than Australia or New Zealand to win the trophy, and qualify for the FIFA Club World Cup.
- (Netherlands) Eredivisie, final matchday:
  - (9) NAC Breda 0–2 (1) Twente
  - (12) N.E.C. 1–4 (2) Ajax
    - Final standings (teams in **bold** qualify for the Champions League, teams in italics qualify for Europa League): **FC Twente** 86 points, **Ajax** 85, PSV 78, Feyenoord 63, AZ 62.
      - Twente win the championship for the first time since their formation in a 1965 merger, with the only other title by one of their predecessor clubs having come in 1926.
      - This also marks the first time since 1958 and 1959 that two consecutive Eredivisie titles have been won by teams outside the historic "Big Three" of Ajax, Feyenoord and PSV.
- (Brazil) Brazilian state championships finals, second leg: (first leg score in parentheses)
  - (São Paulo (state)) São Paulo: **Santos** 2–3 (3–2) Santo André. 5–5 on aggregate; Santos win the title, due to a superior record in the previous phase.
    - Santos win the title for the 18th time.
  - Rio Grande do Sul: **Grêmio** 0–1 (2–0) Internacional. Grêmio win 2–1 on aggregate.
    - Grêmio win the title for the 36th time.
  - Ceará: Ceará 2–1 (0–1) **Fortaleza**. 2–2 on aggregate; Fortaleza win 3–1 on penalties.
    - Fortaleza win the title for the fourth straight time and 39th overall.
  - Bahia: **Vitória** 1–2 (1–0) Bahia. 2–2 on aggregate; Vitória win the title, due to a superior record in the previous phase.
    - Vitória win the title for the third straight time and 25th overall.
  - Minas Gerais: **Atlético Mineiro** 2–0 (3–2) Ipatinga. Atlético Mineiro win 5–2 on aggregate.
    - Atlético Mineiro win the title for the 40th time.
  - (Santa Catarina (state)) Santa Catarina: **Avaí** 2–0 (3–1) Joinville. Avaí win 5–1 on aggregate.
    - Avaí win the title for the 15th time.
  - Goiás: Santa Helena EC 1–3 (0–4) **Atlético Goianiense**. Atlético Goianiense win 7–1 on aggregate.
    - Atlético Goianiense win the title for the 11th time.

==== Golf ====
- PGA Tour:
  - Quail Hollow Championship in Charlotte, North Carolina:
    - Winner: Rory McIlroy (NIR) 273 (−15)
      - McIlroy wins his first PGA Tour title, shooting a final round 62, a course record.
- European Tour:
  - Open de España in Girona, Spain:
    - Winner: Álvaro Quirós (ESP) 277 (−11)^{PO}
      - Quirós wins his fourth European Tour title.
- LPGA Tour:
  - Tres Marias Championship in Morelia, Mexico:
    - Winner: Ai Miyazato (JPN) 273 (−19)
      - Miyazato wins her third tournament from five starts this season, and her fourth LPGA Tour title in total.
      - In her last tournament before retirement, world number one Lorena Ochoa finishes in sixth position, seven strokes behind Miyazato.
- Champions Tour:
  - Mississippi Gulf Resort Classic in Biloxi, Mississippi:
    - Winner: David Eger (USA) 205 (−11)
      - Eger wins his third Champions Tour title.
- Japan Tour:
  - The Crowns in Nagoya, Japan
    - Winner: Ryo Ishikawa (JPN) 267 (−13)
      - Ishikawa wins his seventh Japan Tour title. In doing so, he becomes the first golfer ever to shoot an 18-hole round of 58 on a major professional tour.

==== Gymnastics ====
- European Women's Artistic Gymnastics Championships in Birmingham, United Kingdom:
  - Seniors:
    - Vault: (gold) Yekaterina Kurbatova (RUS) (silver) Youna Dufournet (FRA) (bronze) Tatiana Nabieva (RUS)
    - Uneven bars: (gold) Elizabeth Tweddle (GBR) (silver) Aliya Mustafina (RUS) (bronze) Nataliya Kononenko (UKR)
    - Balance beam: (gold) Elena Amelia Racea (ROU) (silver) Mustafina (bronze) Raluca Oana Haidu (ROU)
    - Floor: (gold) Tweddle (silver) Anna Myzdrikova (RUS) (bronze) Diana Chelaru (ROU)
  - Juniors:
    - Vault: (gold) Viktoria Komova (RUS) (silver) Maria Paseka (RUS) (bronze) Erika Fasana (ITA)
    - Uneven bars: (gold) Anastasia Grishina (RUS) (silver) Komova (bronze) Diana Laura Bulimar (ROU)
    - Balance beam: (gold) Komova (silver) Larisa Iordache (ROU) (bronze) Tess Moonen (NED)
    - Floor: (gold) Grishina (gold) Iordache (bronze) Anastasia Sidorova (RUS)

==== Ice hockey ====
- Stanley Cup playoffs (all series best-of-7):
  - Eastern Conference Semifinals:
    - Game 2: (8) Montreal Canadiens 3, (4) Pittsburgh Penguins 1. Series tied 1–1.
  - Western Conference Semifinals:
    - Game 2: (1) San Jose Sharks 4, (5) Detroit Red Wings 3. Sharks lead series 2–0.

==== Motorcycle racing ====
- Moto GP:
  - Spanish motorcycle Grand Prix in Jerez de la Frontera, Spain:
    - MotoGP: (1) Jorge Lorenzo (ESP) (Yamaha) (2) Dani Pedrosa (ESP) (Honda) (3) Valentino Rossi (ITA) (Yamaha)
      - Riders' championship standings (after 2 of 18 rounds): (1) Lorenzo 45 points (2) Rossi 41 (3) Pedrosa 29
      - Manufacturers' championship standings: (1) Yamaha 50 points (2) Honda 36 (3) Ducati 26
    - Moto2: (1) Toni Elías (ESP) (Moriwaki) (2) Shoya Tomizawa (JPN) (Suter) (3) Thomas Lüthi (SUI) (Moriwaki)
      - Riders' championship standings (after 2 of 17 rounds): (1) Tomizawa 45 points (2) Elías 38 (3) Lüthi 25
      - Manufacturers' championship standings: (1) Suter 45 points (2) Moriwaki 38 (3) MotoBi 21
    - 125cc: (1) Pol Espargaró (ESP) (Derbi) (2) Nicolás Terol (ESP) (Aprilia) (3) Esteve Rabat (ESP) (Aprilia)
      - Riders' championship standings (after 2 of 17 rounds): (1) Terol 45 points (2) Espargaró 38 (3) Rabat 25
      - Manufacturers' championship standings: (1) Aprilia & Derbi 45 points (3) Honda 4

==== Rugby union ====
- Heineken Cup Semi-finals:
  - Biarritz 18–7 (Ireland) Munster in Donostia-San Sebastián, Spain
    - Biarritz will play Toulouse in an all-French final at Stade de France on May 22.

==== Snooker ====
- World Championship in Sheffield, England:
  - Final (best of 35 frames):
    - Neil Robertson (AUS) leads Graeme Dott (SCO) 9–7

==== Tennis ====
- ATP World Tour:
  - Internazionali BNL d'Italia in Rome, Italy:
    - Final: **Rafael Nadal** (ESP) def. David Ferrer (ESP) 7–5, 6–2
      - Nadal wins his second title of the year and 38th of his career. He wins this tournament for the fifth time in six years.
      - Nadal ties Agassi's record of 17 Masters 1000 titles.
- WTA Tour:
  - Porsche Tennis Grand Prix in Stuttgart, Germany:
    - Final: **Justine Henin** (BEL) def. Samantha Stosur (AUS) 6–4, 2–6, 6–1
      - Henin wins the first title since her comeback from retirement and 42nd of her career. It's her 2nd win at the event, also winning in 2007.

==== Volleyball ====
- Men's CEV Champions League Final Four in Łódź, Poland:
  - Third place play-off: (bronze) PGE Skra Bełchatów (Poland) 3–1 (Slovenia) ACH Volley Bled
  - Final: (silver) Dynamo Moscow (Russia) 0–3 (gold) (Italy) Trentino BetClic
    - Trentino win the title for the second straight time.

=== May 1, 2010 (Saturday) ===
==== Auto racing ====
- NASCAR Sprint Cup Series:
  - Crown Royal Presents the Heath Calhoun 400 in Richmond, Virginia
    - (1) (Nevada) Kyle Busch (Toyota, Joe Gibbs Racing) (2) (California) Jeff Gordon (Chevrolet; Hendrick Motorsports) (3) (California) Kevin Harvick (Chevrolet; Richard Childress Racing)
      - Drivers' championship standings (after 10 of 36 races): (1) Harvick 1467 points (2) (California) Jimmie Johnson (Chevrolet, Hendrick Motorsports) 1457 (3) Busch 1358
- IndyCar Series:
  - RoadRunner Turbo Indy 300 in Kansas City, Kansas
    - (1) Scott Dixon (NZL) (Chip Ganassi Racing) (2) Dario Franchitti (GBR) (Chip Ganassi Racing) (3) Tony Kanaan (BRA) (Andretti Autosport)
      - Drivers' championship standings (after 5 of 17 races): (1) Will Power (AUS) (Team Penske) 190 points (2) Dixon 164 (3) Hélio Castroneves (BRA) (Team Penske) 162
- V8 Supercars:
  - City of Ipswich 300 in Queensland Raceway, Ipswich, Queensland
    - Race 9: (1) James Courtney (AUS) (Ford Falcon) (2) Craig Lowndes (AUS) (Holden Commodore) (3) Shane van Gisbergen (NZL) (Ford Falcon)
      - Drivers' championship standings (after 9 of 26 races): (1) Jamie Whincup (AUS) (Holden Commodore) 1191 points (2) Courtney 1017 (3) Mark Winterbottom (AUS) (Ford Falcon) 894

==== Basketball ====
- (United States) NBA Playoffs (best-of-7 series):
  - Eastern Conference Semifinals:
    - Game 1: Cleveland Cavaliers 101, Boston Celtics 93. Cavaliers lead series 1–0.

==== Chess ====
- World Championship in Sofia, Bulgaria:
  - Game 6: Viswanathan Anand (IND) (White) drew with Veselin Topalov (BUL) (Black)
    - Anand leads the series 3½–2½.

==== Cricket ====
- ICC Men's World Twenty20 in West Indies:
  - Group C: Afghanistan 115/8 (20 overs), India 116/3 (14.5 overs) in Gros Islet, St Lucia. **India win by 7 wickets.**
  - Group A: Pakistan 172/3 (20 overs); Bangladesh 151/7 (20 overs) in Gros Islet, St Lucia. **Pakistan win by 21 runs.**

==== Cycling ====
- UCI ProTour:
  - Tour de Romandie:
    - Stage 4: (gold) Simon Špilak (SLO) (Lampre–Farnese Vini) 4h 05' 25" (silver) Peter Sagan (SVK) (Liquigas–Doimo) + 13" (bronze) Philippe Gilbert (BEL) (Omega Pharma–Lotto) + 13"
      - General classification: (1) Michael Rogers (AUS) (Team HTC–Columbia) 14h 01' 50" (2) Alejandro Valverde (ESP) (Caisse d'Epargne) + 1" (3) Špilak + 5"

==== Football (soccer) ====
- Coupe de France Final in Saint-Denis:
  - AS Monaco 0–1 (AET) **Paris Saint-Germain**
    - Paris Saint-Germain win the Cup for the eighth time.
- (Wales) Welsh Cup Final in Llanelli:
  - Port Talbot Town 2–3 **Bangor City**
    - Bangor City win the Cup for the third straight year and eighth time overall.
- (Germany) Fußball-Bundesliga, matchday 33 of 34:
  - (1) Bayern Munich 3–1 (16) Bochum
  - (2) Schalke 04 0–2 (3) Werder Bremen
    - Standings: Bayern Munich 67 points (goal difference +39), Schalke 64 (GD +22), Werder Bremen 60.
      - Bayern Munich all-but-mathematically secure the title because they have a vastly superior goal difference than Schalke. Both teams qualify for the Champions League Group stage.

==== Gymnastics ====
- European Women's Artistic Gymnastics Championships in Birmingham, United Kingdom:
  - Seniors Team: (gold) Russia (silver) United Kingdom (bronze) Romania

==== Horse racing ====
- English Triple Crown:
  - 2,000 Guineas Stakes in Newmarket, Suffolk: (gold) Makfi (trainer: Mikel Delzangles, jockey: Christophe Lemaire) (silver) Dick Turpin (trainer: Richard Hannon Sr., jockey: Ryan Moore) (bronze) Canford Cliffs (trainer: Richard Hannon, jockey: Richard Hughes)
- U.S. Triple Crown:
  - Kentucky Derby in Louisville: (gold) Super Saver (trainer: Todd Pletcher, jockey: Calvin Borel) (silver) Ice Box (trainer: Nick Zito, jockey: Jose Lezcano) (bronze) Paddy O'Prado (trainer: Dale Romans, jockey: Kent Desormeaux)
    - Borel becomes the first jockey to win the race in consecutive years since Eddie Delahoussaye in 1982 and 1983, and the first ever to win three times in four years.

==== Ice hockey ====
- Stanley Cup playoffs (all series best-of-7):
  - Eastern Conference Semifinals:
    - Game 1: (6) Boston Bruins 5, (7) Philadelphia Flyers 4 (OT). Bruins lead series 1–0.
  - Western Conference Semifinals:
    - Game 1: (3) Vancouver Canucks 5, (2) Chicago Blackhawks 1. Canucks lead series 1–0.

==== Rugby union ====
- 2011 Rugby World Cup qualifying:
  - 2010 Asian Five Nations:
    - South Korea 13–71 Japan in Daegu
      - Standings: Hong Kong 7 points (2 matches), Japan, Kazakhstan 6 (1), Arabian Gulf 5 (2), Korea 0 (2).
- Heineken Cup Semi-finals:
  - Toulouse (France) 26–16 (Ireland) Leinster in Toulouse
- Amlin Challenge Cup Semi-finals:
  - London Wasps (England) 15–18 (Wales) Cardiff Blues

==== Snooker ====
- World Championship in Sheffield, England:
  - Semi-finals (best of 33 frames):
    - Neil Robertson (AUS) def. Ali Carter (ENG) 17–12
    - Graeme Dott (SCO) def. Mark Selby (ENG) 17–14

==== Tennis ====
- WTA Tour:
  - Grand Prix SAR La Princesse Lalla Meryem in Fes, Morocco
    - Final: **Iveta Benešová** (CZE) def. Simona Halep (ROU) 6–4, 6–2.
      - Benešová wins the second title of her career.

==== Volleyball ====
- Men's CEV Champions League Final Four in Łódź, Poland:
  - Semifinals:
    - PGE Skra Bełchatów (Poland) 1–3 (Russia) Dynamo Moscow
    - ACH Volley Bled (Slovenia) 1–3 (Italy) Trentino BetClic
