= 2018 Uber Cup knockout stage =

This article lists the fixtures of the knockout stage for the 2018 Uber Cup in Bangkok, Thailand. It began on 24 May with the quarter-finals and ended on 26 May with the final match of the tournament.

== Qualified teams ==
The top two placed teams from each of the eight groups will qualify for the knockout stage.

Group	Winners	Runners-up
A	Japan	Canada
B	Thailand	Chinese Taipei
C	South Korea	Denmark
D	China	Indonesia

== Bracket ==
Quarter-finals
Japan	3
Chinese Taipei	1
South Korea	3
Canada	1
Indonesia	2
Thailand	3
Denmark	1
China	3

Semi-finals
Japan	3
South Korea	1
Thailand	3
China	2

Final
Japan	3
Thailand	0

== Quarter-finals ==
=== Japan vs Chinese Taipei ===
Japan
3
IMPACT Arena Court 3
24 May 2018

Chinese Taipei
1

			1	2	3
1	(Japan) (Chinese Taipei)	Akane Yamaguchi; Tai Tzu-ying	19; 21	16; 21
2	(Japan) (Chinese Taipei)	Yuki Fukushima / Sayaka Hirota; Hsu Ya-ching / Wu Ti-jung	21; 8	21; 17
3	(Japan) (Chinese Taipei)	Nozomi Okuhara; Pai Yu-po	21; 11	21; 12
4	(Japan) (Chinese Taipei)	Misaki Matsutomo / Ayaka Takahashi; Chen Hsiao-huan / Hu Ling-fang	21; 15	21; 11
5	(Japan) (Chinese Taipei)	Sayaka Takahashi; Chiang Mei-hui				not played

=== South Korea vs Canada ===
South Korea
3
IMPACT Arena Court 2
24 May 2018

Canada
1

			1	2	3
1	(South Korea) (Canada)	Sung Ji-hyun; Michelle Li	14; 21	15; 21
2	(South Korea) (Canada)	Lee Jang-mi; Rachel Honderich	21; 13	19; 21	21; 15
3	(South Korea) (Canada)	Baek Ha-na / Lee Yu-rim; Catherine Choi / Michelle Tong	21; 10	21; 7
4	(South Korea) (Canada)	An Se-young; Brittney Tam	21; 13	19; 21	21; 11
5	(South Korea) (Canada)	Kim Hye-rin / Kong Hee-yong; Rachel Honderich / Kristen Tsai				not played

=== Indonesia vs Thailand ===
Indonesia
2
IMPACT Arena Court 1
24 May 2018

Thailand
3

			1	2	3
1	(Indonesia) (Thailand)	Fitriani; Ratchanok Intanon	8; 21	7; 21
2	(Indonesia) (Thailand)	Greysia Polii / Apriyani Rahayu; Jongkolphan Kititharakul / Rawinda Prajongjai	21; 11	21; 16
3	(Indonesia) (Thailand)	Gregoria Mariska Tunjung; Nitchaon Jindapol	21; 10	22; 20
4	(Indonesia) (Thailand)	Della Destiara Haris / Rizki Amelia Pradipta; Puttita Supajirakul / Sapsiree Taerattanachai	20; 22	12; 21
5	(Indonesia) (Thailand)	Ruselli Hartawan; Busanan Ongbumrungpan	9; 21	12; 21

=== Denmark vs China ===
Denmark
1
IMPACT Arena Court 1
24 May 2018

China
3

			1	2	3
1	(Denmark) (China)	Mia Blichfeldt; Chen Yufei	21; 18	13; 21	21; 12
2	(Denmark) (China)	Line Kjærsfeldt; Gao Fangjie	11; 21	11; 21
3	(Denmark) (China)	Maiken Fruergaard / Sara Thygesen; Chen Qingchen / Jia Yifan	10; 21	13; 21
4	(Denmark) (China)	Natalia Koch Rohde; Li Xuerui	7; 21	9; 21
5	(Denmark) (China)	Line Kjærsfeldt / Rikke Søby Hansen; Huang Dongping / Zheng Yu				not played

== Semi-finals ==
=== Japan vs South Korea ===
Japan
3
IMPACT Arena Court 2
25 May 2018

South Korea
1

			1	2	3
1	(Japan) (South Korea)	Akane Yamaguchi; Sung Ji-hyun	21; 10	21; 13
2	(Japan) (South Korea)	Yuki Fukushima / Sayaka Hirota; Kim So-yeong / Shin Seung-chan	19; 21	15; 21
3	(Japan) (South Korea)	Nozomi Okuhara; Lee Jang-mi	21; 9	21; 15
4	(Japan) (South Korea)	Misaki Matsutomo / Ayaka Takahashi; Baek Ha-na / Lee Yu-rim	21; 11	17; 21	21; 14
5	(Japan) (South Korea)	Sayaka Takahashi; An Se-young				not played

=== Thailand vs China ===
Thailand
3
IMPACT Arena Court 1
25 May 2018

China
2

			1	2	3
1	(Thailand) (China)	Ratchanok Intanon; Chen Yufei	15; 21	21; 9	21; 14
2	(Thailand) (China)	Jongkolphan Kititharakul / Rawinda Prajongjai; Chen Qingchen / Jia Yifan	17; 21	20; 22
3	(Thailand) (China)	Nitchaon Jindapol; Gao Fangjie	19; 21	21; 19	21; 12
4	(Thailand) (China)	Puttita Supajirakul / Sapsiree Taerattanachai; Huang Yaqiong / Tang Jinhua	26; 24	17; 21	18; 21
5	(Thailand) (China)	Busanan Ongbumrungpan; Li Xuerui	21; 11	21; 9

== Final ==
=== Japan vs Thailand ===
Japan
3
IMPACT Arena Court 1
26 May 2018

Thailand
0

			1	2	3
1	(Japan) (Thailand)	Akane Yamaguchi; Ratchanok Intanon	21; 15	21; 19
2	(Japan) (Thailand)	Yuki Fukushima / Sayaka Hirota; Jongkolphan Kititharakul / Puttita Supajirakul	21; 18	21; 12
3	(Japan) (Thailand)	Nozomi Okuhara; Nitchaon Jindapol	21; 12	21; 9
4	(Japan) (Thailand)	Misaki Matsutomo / Ayaka Takahashi; Rawinda Prajongjai / Sapsiree Taerattanachai				not played
5	(Japan) (Thailand)	Sayaka Takahashi; Busanan Ongbumrungpan				not played
