= 2018 Thomas Cup knockout stage =

This article lists the fixtures of the knockout stage for the 2018 Thomas Cup in Bangkok, Thailand. It began on 24 May with the quarter-finals and ended on 27 May with the final match of the tournament.

== Qualified teams ==
Group	Winners	Runners-up
A	China	France
B	Indonesia	South Korea
C	Japan	Chinese Taipei
D	Denmark	Malaysia

== Bracket ==
Quarter-finals
China	3
Chinese Taipei	0
Indonesia	3
Malaysia	1
France	1
Japan	3
South Korea	0
Denmark	3

Semi-finals
China	3
Indonesia	1
Japan	3
Denmark	2

Final
China	3
Japan	1

== Quarter-finals ==
=== China vs Chinese Taipei ===
China
3
IMPACT Arena Court 2
24 May 2018

Chinese Taipei
0

			1	2	3
1	(China) (Chinese Taipei)	Chen Long; Chou Tien-chen	21; 18	10; 21	21; 14
2	(China) (Chinese Taipei)	Liu Cheng / Zhang Nan; Lee Jhe-huei / Lee Yang	21; 18	21; 18
3	(China) (Chinese Taipei)	Shi Yuqi; Wang Tzu-wei	21; 18	21; 19
4	(China) (Chinese Taipei)	Li Junhui / Liu Yuchen; Chen Hung-ling / Wang Chi-lin				not played
5	(China) (Chinese Taipei)	Lin Dan; Hsu Jen-hao				not played

=== Indonesia vs Malaysia ===
Indonesia
3
IMPACT Arena Court 3
24 May 2018

Malaysia
1

			1	2	3
1	(Indonesia) (Malaysia)	Anthony Sinisuka Ginting; Lee Chong Wei	19; 21	16; 21
2	(Indonesia) (Malaysia)	Marcus Fernaldi Gideon / Kevin Sanjaya Sukamuljo; Goh V Shem / Tan Wee Kiong	21; 19	20; 22	21; 13
3	(Indonesia) (Malaysia)	Jonatan Christie; Lee Zii Jia	21; 15	11; 21	21; 13
4	(Indonesia) (Malaysia)	Fajar Alfian / Muhammad Rian Ardianto; Aaron Chia / Teo Ee Yi	21; 18	10; 21	21; 9
5	(Indonesia) (Malaysia)	Ihsan Maulana Mustofa; Iskandar Zulkarnain Zainuddin				not played

=== France vs Japan ===
France
1
IMPACT Arena Court 2
24 May 2018

Japan
3

			1	2	3
1	(France) (Japan)	Brice Leverdez; Kento Momota	13; 21	11; 21
2	(France) (Japan)	Bastian Kersaudy / Julien Maio; Takeshi Kamura / Keigo Sonoda	15; 21	9; 21
3	(France) (Japan)	Lucas Corvée; Kazumasa Sakai	21; 17	21; 19
4	(France) (Japan)	Thom Gicquel / Ronan Labar; Hiroyuki Endo / Yuta Watanabe	17; 21	18; 21
5	(France) (Japan)	Toma Junior Popov; Kanta Tsuneyama				not played

=== South Korea vs Denmark ===
South Korea
0
IMPACT Arena Court 1
24 May 2018

Denmark
3

			1	2	3
1	(South Korea) (Denmark)	Son Wan-ho; Viktor Axelsen	14; 21	21; 14	20; 22
2	(South Korea) (Denmark)	Chung Eui-seok / Kim Duk-young; Mads Conrad-Petersen / Mads Pieler Kolding	11; 21	19; 21
3	(South Korea) (Denmark)	Lee Dong-keun; Hans-Kristian Vittinghus	8; 21	21; 15	17; 21
4	(South Korea) (Denmark)	Choi Sol-gyu / Kim Won-ho; Mathias Boe / Mathias Christiansen				not played
5	(South Korea) (Denmark)	Heo Kwang-hee; Jan Ø. Jørgensen				not played

== Semi-finals ==
=== China vs Indonesia ===
China
3
IMPACT Arena Court 2
25 May 2018

Indonesia
1

			1	2	3
1	(China) (Indonesia)	Chen Long; Anthony Sinisuka Ginting	22; 20	21; 16
2	(China) (Indonesia)	Liu Cheng / Zhang Nan; Marcus Fernaldi Gideon / Kevin Sanjaya Sukamuljo	21; 12	17; 21	15; 21
3	(China) (Indonesia)	Shi Yuqi; Jonatan Christie	18; 21	21; 12	21; 15
4	(China) (Indonesia)	Li Junhui / Liu Yuchen; Mohammad Ahsan / Hendra Setiawan	21; 17	18; 21	21; 12
5	(China) (Indonesia)	Lin Dan; Ihsan Maulana Mustofa				not played

=== Japan vs Denmark ===
Japan
3
IMPACT Arena Court 1
25 May 2018

Denmark
2

			1	2	3
1	(Japan) (Denmark)	Kento Momota; Viktor Axelsen	21; 17	21; 9
2	(Japan) (Denmark)	Takeshi Kamura / Keigo Sonoda; Mathias Boe / Mads Conrad-Petersen	18; 21	15; 21
3	(Japan) (Denmark)	Kenta Nishimoto; Hans-Kristian Vittinghus	21; 19	21; 12
4	(Japan) (Denmark)	Takuto Inoue / Yuki Kaneko; Kim Astrup / Anders Skaarup Rasmussen	21; 17	16; 21	15; 21
5	(Japan) (Denmark)	Kanta Tsuneyama; Jan Ø. Jørgensen	21; 18	21; 11

== Final ==
=== China vs Japan ===
China
3
IMPACT Arena Court 1
27 May 2018

Japan
1

			1	2	3
1	(China) (Japan)	Chen Long; Kento Momota	9; 21	18; 21
2	(China) (Japan)	Liu Cheng / Zhang Nan; Takuto Inoue / Yuki Kaneko	21; 10	21; 18
3	(China) (Japan)	Shi Yuqi; Kenta Nishimoto	21; 12	21; 17
4	(China) (Japan)	Li Junhui / Liu Yuchen; Keigo Sonoda / Yuta Watanabe	17; 21	21; 19	22; 20
5	(China) (Japan)	Lin Dan; Kanta Tsuneyama				not played
