= 2018 Thomas & Uber Cup =

2018 Thomas & Uber Cup โธมัส-อูเบอร์ คัพ 2018

Tournament details
- Dates: 20–27 May 2018
- Edition: 30th (Thomas Cup); 27th (Uber Cup)
- Level: International
- Nations: 16 (Thomas Cup); 16 (Uber Cup)
- Venue: IMPACT Arena
- Location: Bangkok, Thailand
- Official website: bwfthomasubercups.com

The 2018 Thomas & Uber Cup (officially known as the 2018 BWF Thomas & Uber Cup) was the 30th edition of the Thomas Cup and the 27th edition of the Uber Cup, the biennial international badminton championship contested by the men and women's national teams of the member associations of Badminton World Federation (BWF). The tournament was hosted by Bangkok, Thailand 20–27 May 2018.

The matches were played at IMPACT Arena. It was the second time that Thailand hosted the Thomas Cup and the first time hosted the Uber Cup tournament and the first time this event was held in Southeast Asia since 2010 in Malaysia.

Denmark were the defending men's champions, and China were the defending women's champions.

== Host selection ==
Bangkok and New Delhi submitted bids for this championships. Bangkok was named as the host in March 2017 during BWF Council meeting in Kuala Lumpur, Malaysia, where BWF also decided the host for 2018 BWF World Championships, 2019 Sudirman Cup and 2019 BWF World Championships.

== Qualification ==
=== Thomas Cup ===
Means of qualification	Date	Venue	Vacancies	Qualified
Host country	18 March 2017	(Malaysia) Kuala Lumpur	1	Thailand
2016 Thomas Cup	22 May 2016	(China) Kunshan	1	Denmark
2018 Oceania Championships	6–11 February 2018	(New Zealand) Hamilton	1	Australia
2018 Asia Team Championships	6–11 February 2018	(Malaysia) Alor Setar	4	Indonesia
2018 Asia Team Championships	6–11 February 2018	(Malaysia) Alor Setar	4	China
2018 Asia Team Championships	6–11 February 2018	(Malaysia) Alor Setar	4	South Korea
2018 Asia Team Championships	6–11 February 2018	(Malaysia) Alor Setar	4	Malaysia
2018 All Africa Team Championships	12–15 February 2018	(Algeria) Algiers	1	Algeria
2018 European Team Championships	13–18 February 2018	(Russia) Kazan	4–1	~~England~~^{2}
2018 European Team Championships	13–18 February 2018	(Russia) Kazan	4–1	Germany
2018 European Team Championships	13–18 February 2018	(Russia) Kazan	4–1	France
2018 European Team Championships	13–18 February 2018	(Russia) Kazan	4–1	Russia^{1}
2018 Pan Am Championships	15–18 February 2018	(Trinidad and Tobago) Tacarigua	1	Canada
Best world team rankings	18 February 2018	(Malaysia) Kuala Lumpur	3+1	Chinese Taipei
Best world team rankings	18 February 2018	(Malaysia) Kuala Lumpur	3+1	Japan
Best world team rankings	18 February 2018	(Malaysia) Kuala Lumpur	3+1	India
Best world team rankings	18 February 2018	(Malaysia) Kuala Lumpur	3+1	Hong Kong^{2}
Total			16	

Note

^1 Best ranked team from Europe
^2 England withdrew, and replaced by Hong Kong as the next highest ranked team

=== Uber Cup ===
Means of qualification	Date	Venue	Vacancies	Qualified
Host country	18 March 2017	(Malaysia) Kuala Lumpur	1	Thailand
2016 Uber Cup	22 May 2016	(China) Kunshan	1	China
2018 Oceania Championships	6–11 February 2018	(New Zealand) Hamilton	1	Australia
2018 Asia Team Championships	6–11 February 2018	(Malaysia) Alor Setar	4	Japan
2018 Asia Team Championships	6–11 February 2018	(Malaysia) Alor Setar	4	South Korea
2018 Asia Team Championships	6–11 February 2018	(Malaysia) Alor Setar	4	Indonesia
2018 Asia Team Championships	6–11 February 2018	(Malaysia) Alor Setar	4	Chinese Taipei^{3}
2018 All Africa Team Championships	12–15 February 2018	(Algeria) Algiers	1	Mauritius
2018 European Team Championships	13–18 February 2018	(Russia) Kazan	4–1	Denmark
2018 European Team Championships	13–18 February 2018	(Russia) Kazan	4–1	Germany
2018 European Team Championships	13–18 February 2018	(Russia) Kazan	4–1	Russia
2018 European Team Championships	13–18 February 2018	(Russia) Kazan	4–1	~~Spain~~^{4}
2018 Pan Am Championships	15–18 February 2018	(Trinidad and Tobago) Tacarigua	1	Canada
Best world team rankings	18 February 2018	(Malaysia) Kuala Lumpur	3+1	India
Best world team rankings	18 February 2018	(Malaysia) Kuala Lumpur	3+1	Malaysia
Best world team rankings	18 February 2018	(Malaysia) Kuala Lumpur	3+1	Hong Kong
Best world team rankings	18 February 2018	(Malaysia) Kuala Lumpur	3+1	France^{4}
Total			16	

Note

^3 Best ranked team from Asia
^4 Spain withdrew and replaced by France as the next highest ranked team

== Draw ==
The draw for the tournament was conducted on 22 March 2018, at 18:00 ICT, at Arnoma Grand Hotel in Bangkok. The 16 men and 16 women teams were drawn into four groups of four.

For the Thomas Cup draw, the teams were allocated to three pots based on the World Team Rankings of 22 February 2018. Pot 1 contained the top seed China (which were assigned to position A1), the second seed Denmark (which were assigned to position D1) and the next two best teams, Indonesia and Chinese Taipei. Pot 2 contained the next best four teams, and Pot 3 was for the ninth to sixteenth seeds.

A similar procedure was applied for Uber Cup draw, where top seed Japan (which were assigned to position A1), the second seed China (which were assigned to position D1), Korea and Thailand were in Pot 1.

Thomas Cup

Pot 1	Pot 2	Pot 3
China; Denmark; Indonesia; Chinese Taipei	Japan; India; Malaysia; South Korea	Thailand; Hong Kong; Russia; Germany France; Canada; Australia; Algeria

Uber Cup

Pot 1	Pot 2	Pot 3
Japan; China; South Korea; Thailand	Chinese Taipei; India; Indonesia; Denmark	Malaysia; Hong Kong; Russia; Germany Canada; France; Australia; Mauritius

== Tiebreakers ==
The rankings of teams in each group were determined as follows (regulations Chapter 5 Section 5.2.1. Article 12):

1. Points
2. Results between tied teams
3. Match difference
4. Game difference
5. Point difference

Teams that won 3 match first win the tie: 1 point for the winner, 0 match points for the loser.

== Medal summary ==
=== Medalists ===
Event	Gold	Silver	Bronze
Thomas Cup	China; Chen Long; Shi Yuqi; Lin Dan; Qiao Bin; Liu Cheng; Zhang Nan; Li Junhui; Liu Yuchen; Wang Yilü; Zheng Siwei	Japan; Kento Momota; Kenta Nishimoto; Kazumasa Sakai; Kanta Tsuneyama; Takeshi Kamura; Keigo Sonoda; Takuto Inoue; Yuki Kaneko; Hiroyuki Endo; Yuta Watanabe	Denmark; Viktor Axelsen; Anders Antonsen; Hans-Kristian Vittinghus; Jan Ø. Jørgensen; Mathias Boe; Mads Conrad-Petersen; Mads Pieler Kolding; Kim Astrup; Anders Skaarup Rasmussen
Thomas Cup	China; Chen Long; Shi Yuqi; Lin Dan; Qiao Bin; Liu Cheng; Zhang Nan; Li Junhui; Liu Yuchen; Wang Yilü; Zheng Siwei	Japan; Kento Momota; Kenta Nishimoto; Kazumasa Sakai; Kanta Tsuneyama; Takeshi Kamura; Keigo Sonoda; Takuto Inoue; Yuki Kaneko; Hiroyuki Endo; Yuta Watanabe	Indonesia; Anthony Sinisuka Ginting; Jonatan Christie; Ihsan Maulana Mustofa; Firman Abdul Kholik; Marcus Fernaldi Gideon; Kevin Sanjaya Sukamuljo; Fajar Alfian; Muhammad Rian Ardianto; Mohammad Ahsan; Hendra Setiawan
Uber Cup	Japan; Akane Yamaguchi; Nozomi Okuhara; Sayaka Sato; Sayaka Takahashi; Yuki Fukushima; Sayaka Hirota; Misaki Matsutomo; Ayaka Takahashi; Shiho Tanaka; Koharu Yonemoto	Thailand; Ratchanok Intanon; Nitchaon Jindapol; Busanan Ongbamrungphan; Pornpawee Chochuwong; Jongkolphan Kititharakul; Rawinda Prajongjai; Phataimas Muenwong; Chayanit Chaladchalam; Puttita Supajirakul; Sapsiree Taerattanachai	South Korea; Sung Ji-hyun; Lee Jang-mi; Lee Se-yeon; An Se-young; Shin Seung-chan; Kim So-yeong; Kim Hye-rin; Kong Hee-yong; Baek Ha-na; Lee Yu-lim
Uber Cup	Japan; Akane Yamaguchi; Nozomi Okuhara; Sayaka Sato; Sayaka Takahashi; Yuki Fukushima; Sayaka Hirota; Misaki Matsutomo; Ayaka Takahashi; Shiho Tanaka; Koharu Yonemoto	Thailand; Ratchanok Intanon; Nitchaon Jindapol; Busanan Ongbamrungphan; Pornpawee Chochuwong; Jongkolphan Kititharakul; Rawinda Prajongjai; Phataimas Muenwong; Chayanit Chaladchalam; Puttita Supajirakul; Sapsiree Taerattanachai	China; Chen Yufei; He Bingjiao; Gao Fangjie; Li Xuerui; Chen Qingchen; Jia Yifan; Huang Yaqiong; Huang Dongping; Tang Jinhua; Zheng Yu

=== Medal table ===
* Host nation (Thailand)

Rank	Nation	Gold	Silver	Bronze	Total
1	Japan	1	1	0	2
2	China	1	0	1	2
3	Thailand*	0	1	0	1
4	Denmark	0	0	1	1
4	Indonesia	0	0	1	1
4	South Korea	0	0	1	1
Totals (6 entries)		2	2	4	8

== Thomas Cup ==
=== Group stage ===
==== Group A ====
Pos	Team	Pld	W	L	MF	MA	MD	GF	GA	GD	PF	PA	PD	Pts	Qualification	People's Republic of China	France	India	Australia
1	China	3	3	0	15	0	+15	30	3	+27	681	416	+265	3	Advance to Quarter-finals	—	5–0	5–0	5–0
2	France	3	2	1	9	6	+3	18	14	+4	566	532	+34	2	Advance to Quarter-finals		—	4–1	5–0
3	India	3	1	2	6	9	−3	17	19	−2	618	632	−14	1				—	5–0
4	Australia	3	0	3	0	15	−15	1	30	−29	365	650	−285	0					—

Source: BWF
Rules for classification: Tiebreakers

20 May 2018
9:00

India	1–4	France
Result

IMPACT Arena Court 1, Bangkok

20 May 2018
19:00

China	5–0	Australia
Result

IMPACT Arena Court 4, Bangkok

21 May 2018
19:00

China	5–0	France
Result

IMPACT Arena Court 1, Bangkok

21 May 2018
19:00

India	5–0	Australia
Result

IMPACT Arena Court 3, Bangkok

22 May 2018
19:00

China	5–0	India
Result

IMPACT Arena Court 1, Bangkok

22 May 2018
19:00

France	5–0	Australia
Result

IMPACT Arena Court 4, Bangkok

==== Group B ====
Pos	Team	Pld	W	L	MF	MA	MD	GF	GA	GD	PF	PA	PD	Pts	Qualification	Indonesia	South Korea	Thailand	Canada
1	Indonesia	3	3	0	12	3	+9	25	10	+15	700	532	+168	3	Advance to Quarter-finals	—	3–2	4–1	5–0
2	South Korea	3	2	1	9	6	+3	22	15	+7	685	644	+41	2	Advance to Quarter-finals		—	3–2	4–1
3	Thailand (H)	3	1	2	8	7	+1	20	15	+5	645	641	+4	1				—	5–0
4	Canada	3	0	3	1	14	−13	2	29	−27	414	627	−213	0					—

Source: BWF
Rules for classification: Tiebreakers
(H) Host

20 May 2018
9:00

Indonesia	5–0	Canada
Result

IMPACT Arena Court 4, Bangkok

20 May 2018
19:00

South Korea	3–2	Thailand
Result

IMPACT Arena Court 1, Bangkok

21 May 2018
14:00

South Korea	4–1	Canada
Result

IMPACT Arena Court 4, Bangkok

22 May 2018
19:00

Indonesia	4–1	Thailand
Result

IMPACT Arena Court 1, Bangkok

23 May 2018
14:00

Indonesia	3–2	South Korea
Result

IMPACT Arena Court 2, Bangkok

23 May 2018
14:00

Thailand	5–0	Canada
Result

IMPACT Arena Court 4, Bangkok

==== Group C ====
Pos	Team	Pld	W	L	MF	MA	MD	GF	GA	GD	PF	PA	PD	Pts	Qualification	Japan	Chinese Taipei for Olympic games	Hong Kong	Germany
1	Japan	3	3	0	13	2	+11	27	10	+17	730	621	+109	3	Advance to Quarter-finals	—	5–0	4–1	4–1
2	Chinese Taipei	3	2	1	9	6	+3	20	13	+7	642	611	+31	2	Advance to Quarter-finals		—	4–1	5–0
3	Hong Kong	3	1	2	5	10	−5	13	22	−9	629	655	−26	1				—	3–2
4	Germany	3	0	3	3	12	−9	11	26	−15	623	737	−114	0					—

Source: BWF
Rules for classification: Tiebreakers

20 May 2018
14:00

Japan	4–1	Hong Kong
Result

IMPACT Arena Court 2, Bangkok

20 May 2018
19:00

Chinese Taipei	5–0	Germany
Result

IMPACT Arena Court 3, Bangkok

22 May 2018
9:00

Japan	4–1	Germany
Result

IMPACT Arena Court 3, Bangkok

22 May 2018
14:00

Chinese Taipei	4–1	Hong Kong
Result

IMPACT Arena Court 1, Bangkok

23 May 2018
9:00

Chinese Taipei	0–5	Japan
Result

IMPACT Arena Court 1, Bangkok

23 May 2018
9:00

Hong Kong	3–2	Germany
Result

IMPACT Arena Court 3, Bangkok

==== Group D ====
Pos	Team	Pld	W	L	MF	MA	MD	GF	GA	GD	PF	PA	PD	Pts	Qualification	Denmark	Malaysia	Russia	Algeria
1	Denmark	3	3	0	13	2	+11	26	7	+19	667	416	+251	3	Advance to Quarter-finals	—	3–2	5–0	5–0
2	Malaysia	3	2	1	12	3	+9	27	6	+21	659	478	+181	2	Advance to Quarter-finals		—	5–0	5–0
3	Russia	3	1	2	5	10	−5	10	20	−10	446	505	−59	1				—	5–0
4	Algeria	3	0	3	0	15	−15	0	30	−30	257	630	−373	0					—

Source: BWF
Rules for classification: Tiebreakers

21 May 2018
9:00

Malaysia	5–0	Russia
Result

IMPACT Arena Court 2, Bangkok

21 May 2018
9:00

Denmark	5–0	Algeria
Result

IMPACT Arena Court 3, Bangkok

22 May 2018
9:00

Denmark	5–0	Russia
Result

IMPACT Arena Court 2, Bangkok

22 May 2018
14:00

Malaysia	5–0	Algeria
Result

IMPACT Arena Court 3, Bangkok

23 May 2018
19:00

Denmark	3–2	Malaysia
Result

IMPACT Arena Court 1, Bangkok

23 May 2018
19:00

Russia	5–0	Algeria
Result

IMPACT Arena Court 3, Bangkok

=== Knockout stage ===
==== Bracket ====
Quarter-finals
China	3
Chinese Taipei	0
Indonesia	3
Malaysia	1
France	1
Japan	3
South Korea	0
Denmark	3

Semi-finals
China	3
Indonesia	1
Japan	3
Denmark	2

Final
China	3
Japan	1

==== Quarter-finals ====
24 May 2010
14:00

China	3–0	Chinese Taipei
Result

IMPACT Arena Court 2, Bangkok

24 May 2018
19:00

Indonesia	3–1	Malaysia
Result

IMPACT Arena Court 3, Bangkok

24 May 2018
19:00

France	1–3	Japan
Result

IMPACT Arena Court 2, Bangkok

24 May 2018
19:00

South Korea	0–3	Denmark
Result

IMPACT Arena Court 1, Bangkok

==== Semi-finals ====
25 May 2018
18:00

China	3–1	Indonesia
Result

IMPACT Arena Court 2, Bangkok

25 May 2018
18:00

Japan	3–2	Denmark
Result

IMPACT Arena Court 1, Bangkok

==== Final ====
27 May 2018
13:00

China	3–1	Japan
Result

IMPACT Arena Court 1, Bangkok

2018 Thomas Cup champion

China
Tenth title

=== Final ranking ===
Pos	Team	Pld	W	L	Pts	MD	GD	PD	Final result
1st place, gold medalist(s)	China	6	6	0	6	+22	+38	+315	Champions
2nd place, silver medalist(s)	Japan	6	5	1	5	+12	+21	+158	Runners-up
3rd place, bronze medalist(s)	Denmark	5	4	1	4	+13	+20	+252	Eliminated in semi-finals
3rd place, bronze medalist(s)	Indonesia	5	4	1	4	+9	+13	+149	Eliminated in semi-finals
5	Malaysia	4	2	2	2	+7	+20	+172	Eliminated in quarter-finals
6	France	4	2	2	2	+1	0	−3	Eliminated in quarter-finals
7	South Korea	4	2	2	2	0	+3	+16	Eliminated in quarter-finals
8	Chinese Taipei	4	2	2	2	0	+2	+21	Eliminated in quarter-finals
9	Thailand	3	1	2	1	+1	+5	+4	Eliminated in group stage
10	India	3	1	2	1	−3	−2	−14	Eliminated in group stage
11	Hong Kong	3	1	2	1	−5	−9	−26	Eliminated in group stage
12	Russia	3	1	2	1	−5	−10	−59	Eliminated in group stage
13	Germany	3	0	3	0	−9	−15	−114	Eliminated in group stage
14	Canada	3	0	3	0	−13	−27	−213	Eliminated in group stage
15	Australia	3	0	3	0	−15	−29	−285	Eliminated in group stage
16	Algeria	3	0	3	0	−15	−30	−373	Eliminated in group stage

== Uber Cup ==
=== Group stage ===
==== Group A ====
Pos	Team	Pld	W	L	MF	MA	MD	GF	GA	GD	PF	PA	PD	Pts	Qualification	Japan	Canada	India	Australia
1	Japan	3	3	0	15	0	+15	30	1	+29	643	363	+280	3	Advance to Quarter-finals	—	5–0	5–0	5–0
2	Canada	3	2	1	8	7	+1	16	16	0	566	556	+10	2	Advance to Quarter-finals		—	4–1	4–1
3	India	3	1	2	5	10	−5	12	20	−8	521	585	−64	1				—	4–1
4	Australia	3	0	3	2	13	−11	5	26	−21	410	636	−226	0					—

Source: BWF
Rules for classification: Tiebreakers

20 May 2018
9:00

Japan	5–0	Australia
Result

IMPACT Arena Court 3, Bangkok

20 May 2018
14:00

India	1–4	Canada
Result

IMPACT Arena Court 3, Bangkok

21 May 2018
9:00

Japan	5–0	Canada
Result

IMPACT Arena Court 1, Bangkok

21 May 2018
14:00

India	4–1	Australia
Result

IMPACT Arena Court 1, Bangkok

23 May 2018
14:00

Japan	5–0	India
Result

IMPACT Arena Court 1, Bangkok

23 May 2018
14:00

Canada	4–1	Australia
Result

IMPACT Arena Court 3, Bangkok

==== Group B ====
Pos	Team	Pld	W	L	MF	MA	MD	GF	GA	GD	PF	PA	PD	Pts	Qualification	Thailand	Chinese Taipei for Olympic games	Hong Kong	Germany
1	Thailand (H)	3	3	0	13	2	+11	27	6	+21	650	481	+169	3	Advance to Quarter-finals	—	3–2	5–0	5–0
2	Chinese Taipei	3	2	1	11	4	+7	24	12	+12	695	604	+91	2	Advance to Quarter-finals		—	4–1	5–0
3	Hong Kong	3	1	2	5	10	−5	12	23	−11	580	667	−87	1				—	4–1
4	Germany	3	0	3	1	14	−13	6	28	−22	512	685	−173	0					—

Source: BWF
Rules for classification: Tiebreakers
(H) Host

20 May 2018
9:00

Chinese Taipei	4–1	Hong Kong
Result

IMPACT Arena Court 2, Bangkok

20 May 2018
14:00

Thailand	5–0	Germany
Result

IMPACT Arena Court 1, Bangkok

21 May 2018
19:00

Thailand	5–0	Hong Kong
Result

IMPACT Arena Court 2, Bangkok

22 May 2018
19:00

Chinese Taipei	5–0	Germany
Result

IMPACT Arena Court 3, Bangkok

23 May 2018
19:00

Thailand	3–2	Chinese Taipei
Result

IMPACT Arena Court 2, Bangkok

23 May 2018
19:00

Hong Kong	4–1	Germany
Result

IMPACT Arena Court 3, Bangkok

==== Group C ====
Pos	Team	Pld	W	L	MF	MA	MD	GF	GA	GD	PF	PA	PD	Pts	Qualification	South Korea	Denmark	Russia	Mauritius
1	South Korea	3	3	0	13	2	+11	26	5	+21	635	374	+261	3	Advance to Quarter-finals	—	3–2	5–0	5–0
2	Denmark	3	2	1	11	4	+7	23	11	+12	650	486	+164	2	Advance to Quarter-finals		—	4–1	5–0
3	Russia	3	1	2	6	9	−3	16	19	−3	593	613	−20	1				—	5–0
4	Mauritius	3	0	3	0	15	−15	0	30	−30	225	630	−405	0					—

Source: BWF
Rules for classification: Tiebreakers

20 May 2018
14:00

South Korea	5–0	Mauritius
Result

IMPACT Arena Court 2, Bangkok

20 May 2018
19:00

Denmark	4–1	Russia
Result

IMPACT Arena Court 3, Bangkok

21 May 2018
14:00

Denmark	5–0	Mauritius
Result

IMPACT Arena Court 3, Bangkok

21 May 2018
19:00

South Korea	5–0	Russia
Result

IMPACT Arena Court 4, Bangkok

22 May 2018
14:00

South Korea	3–2	Denmark
Result

IMPACT Arena Court 2, Bangkok

22 May 2018
14:00

Russia	5–0	Mauritius
Result

IMPACT Arena Court 3, Bangkok

==== Group D ====
Pos	Team	Pld	W	L	MF	MA	MD	GF	GA	GD	PF	PA	PD	Pts	Qualification	People's Republic of China	Indonesia	Malaysia	France
1	China	3	3	0	12	3	+9	26	7	+19	661	507	+154	3	Advance to Quarter-finals	—	3–2	4–1	5–0
2	Indonesia	3	2	1	10	5	+5	22	13	+9	675	619	+56	2	Advance to Quarter-finals		—	3–2	5–0
3	Malaysia	3	1	2	8	7	+1	18	20	−2	700	679	+21	1				—	5–0
4	France	3	0	3	0	15	−15	4	30	−26	469	700	−231	0					—

Source: BWF
Rules for classification: Tiebreakers

21 May 2018
9:00

China	5–0	France
Result

IMPACT Arena Court 3, Bangkok

21 May 2018
14:00

Indonesia	3–2	Malaysia
Result

IMPACT Arena Court 2, Bangkok

22 May 2018
9:00

China	4–1	Malaysia
Result

IMPACT Arena Court 4, Bangkok

22 May 2018
9:00

Indonesia	5–0	France
Result

IMPACT Arena Court 2, Bangkok

23 May 2018
9:00

China	3–2	Indonesia
Result

IMPACT Arena Court 2, Bangkok

23 May 2018
9:00

Malaysia	5–0	France
Result

IMPACT Arena Court 4, Bangkok

=== Knockout stage ===
==== Bracket ====
Quarter-finals
Japan	3
Chinese Taipei	1
South Korea	3
Canada	1
Indonesia	2
Thailand	3
Denmark	1
China	3

Semi-finals
Japan	3
South Korea	1
Thailand	3
China	2

Final
Japan	3
Thailand	0

==== Quarter-finals ====
24 May 2018
14:00

Japan	3–1	Chinese Taipei
Result

IMPACT Arena Court 3, Bangkok

24 May 2018
9:00

South Korea	3–1	Canada
Result

IMPACT Arena Court 2, Bangkok

24 May 2018
14:00

Indonesia	2–3	Thailand
Result

IMPACT Arena Court 1, Bangkok

24 May 2018
9:00

Denmark	1–3	China
Result

IMPACT Arena Court 1, Bangkok

==== Semi-finals ====
25 May 2018
12:00

Japan	3–1	South Korea
Result

IMPACT Arena Court 2, Bangkok

25 May 2018
12:00

Thailand	3–2	China
Result

IMPACT Arena Court 1, Bangkok

==== Final ====
26 May 2018
13:00

Japan	3–0	Thailand
Result

IMPACT Arena Court 1, Bangkok

2018 Uber Cup champion

Japan
Sixth title

=== Final ranking ===
Pos	Team	Pld	W	L	Pts	MD	GD	PD	Final result
1st place, gold medalist(s)	Japan	6	6	0	6	+22	+42	+408	Champions
2nd place, silver medalist(s)	Thailand	6	5	1	5	+10	+18	+192	Runners-up
3rd place, bronze medalist(s)	South Korea	5	4	1	4	+11	+20	+259	Eliminated in semi-finals
3rd place, bronze medalist(s)	China	5	4	1	4	+10	+23	+182	Eliminated in semi-finals
5	Chinese Taipei	4	2	2	2	+5	+8	+46	Eliminated in quarter-finals
6	Denmark	4	2	2	2	+5	+7	+103	Eliminated in quarter-finals
7	Indonesia	4	2	2	2	+4	+7	+25	Eliminated in quarter-finals
8	Canada	4	2	2	2	−1	−2	−30	Eliminated in quarter-finals
9	Malaysia	3	1	2	1	+1	−2	+21	Eliminated in group stage
10	Russia	3	1	2	1	−3	−3	−20	Eliminated in group stage
11	India	3	1	2	1	−5	−8	−64	Eliminated in group stage
12	Hong Kong	3	1	2	1	−5	−11	−87	Eliminated in group stage
13	Australia	3	0	3	0	−11	−21	−226	Eliminated in group stage
14	Germany	3	0	3	0	−13	−22	−173	Eliminated in group stage
15	France	3	0	3	0	−15	−26	−231	Eliminated in group stage
16	Mauritius	3	0	3	0	−15	−30	−405	Eliminated in group stage

== International Broadcasters ==
Country/Region	Broadcaster	Ref
Thailand (host)	True Corporation	
International (unsold markets only)	YouTube	
China	CCTV	
Denmark	TV2 Sport	
Hong Kong	I-Cable	
India	Star Sports	
Indonesia	TVRI	
Indonesia	iNews	
Indonesia	K-Vision	
Indonesia	SportsFix	
Malaysia	RTM	
Malaysia	Astro	
Singapore	StarHub	

== See also ==
- 2017 Sudirman Cup
- 2018 BWF World Championships
