= 2010 Uber Cup group stage =

This article lists the complete results of the group stage of the 2010 Uber Cup in Kuala Lumpur, Malaysia.

== Draw ==
=== Group composition ===
Group
Group A	Group B	Group C	Group D
China; Malaysia (Host); United States	Indonesia; Denmark; Australia	Japan; Russia; Germany	South Korea; India; South Africa

== Group A ==
Pos	Team	Pld	W	L	MF	MA	MD	GF	GA	GD	PF	PA	PD	Pts	Qualification
1	China	2	2	0	10	0	+10	20	0	+20	420	167	+253	2	Advance to quarter-finals
2	Malaysia (H)	2	1	1	5	5	0	10	12	−2	348	371	−23	1	Advance to quarter-finals
3	United States	2	0	2	0	10	−10	2	20	−18	228	458	−230	0	

Source: BadmintonCN
(H) Host

=== China vs United States ===
China
5
Putra Indoor Stadium, Court 2
9 May 2010, 18:00 UTC+8

United States
0

			1	2	3
1	(China) (United States)	Wang Yihan; Rena Wang	21; 2	21; 9
2	(China) (United States)	Ma Jin / Wang Xiaoli; Eva Lee / Mesinee Mangkalakiri	21; 7	21; 12
3	(China) (United States)	Wang Xin; Iris Wang	21; 8	21; 7
4	(China) (United States)	Pan Pan / Tian Qing; Kuei Ya Chen / Priscilla Lun	21; 5	21; 5
5	(China) (United States)	Wang Shixian; Cee Nantana Ketpura	21; 7	21; 5

=== Malaysia vs United States ===
Malaysia
5
Putra Indoor Stadium, Court 2
10 May 2010, 18:00 UTC+8

United States
0

			1	2	3
1	(Malaysia) (United States)	Wong Mew Choo; Rena Wang	21; 7	21; 10
2	(Malaysia) (United States)	Tee Jing Yi; Eva Lee	21; 12	21; 14
3	(Malaysia) (United States)	Sonia Cheah Su Ya; Cee Nantana Ketpura	21; 16	16; 21	21; 9
4	(Malaysia) (United States)	Chin Eei Hui / Wong Pei Tty; Kuei Ya Chen / Priscilla Lun	21; 9	21; 8
5	(Malaysia) (United States)	Ng Hui Lin / Woon Khe Wei; Eva Lee / Mesinee Mangkalakiri	21; 17	22; 24	21; 14

=== China vs Malaysia ===
China
5
Putra Indoor Stadium, Court 2
11 May 2010, 18:00 UTC+8

Malaysia
0

			1	2	3
1	(China) (Malaysia)	Wang Yihan; Sannatasah Saniru	21; 11	21; 8
2	(China) (Malaysia)	Ma Jin / Wang Xiaoli; Goh Liu Ying / Ng Hui Lin	21; 8	21; 10
3	(China) (Malaysia)	Wang Xin; Tee Jing Yi	21; 12	21; 5
4	(China) (Malaysia)	Du Jing / Yu Yang; Vivian Hoo / Woon Khe Wei	21; 9	21; 9
5	(China) (Malaysia)	Jiang Yanjiao; Sonia Cheah Su Ya	21; 15	21; 13

== Group B ==
Pos	Team	Pld	W	L	MF	MA	MD	GF	GA	GD	PF	PA	PD	Pts	Qualification
1	Indonesia	2	2	0	10	0	+10	20	1	+19	433	243	+190	2	Advance to quarter-finals
2	Denmark	2	1	1	3	7	−4	7	14	−7	313	389	−76	1	Advance to quarter-finals
3	Australia	2	0	2	2	8	−6	4	16	−12	271	385	−114	0	

Source: BadmintonCN

=== Indonesia vs Australia ===
Indonesia
5
Putra Indoor Stadium, Court 1
9 May 2010, 12:00 UTC+8

Australia
0

			1	2	3
1	(Indonesia) (Australia)	Maria Febe Kusumastuti; Leanne Choo	21; 13	21; 5
2	(Indonesia) (Australia)	Nitya Krishinda Maheswari / Greysia Polii; Tang He Tian / Renuga Veeran	21; 16	21; 11
3	(Indonesia) (Australia)	Adriyanti Firdasari; Erica Pong	21; 12	21; 5
4	(Indonesia) (Australia)	Shendy Puspa Irawati / Liliyana Natsir; Eugenia Tanaka / Kate Wilson-Smith	21; 13	21; 11
5	(Indonesia) (Australia)	Maria Kristin Yulianti; Huang Chia-chi	21; 6	21; 13

=== Denmark vs Australia ===
Denmark
3
Putra Indoor Stadium, Court 1
10 May 2010, 12:00 UTC+8

Australia
2

			1	2	3
1	(Denmark) (Australia)	Camilla Sørensen; Erica Pong	21; 15	21; 6
2	(Denmark) (Australia)	Karina Jørgensen; Renuga Veeran	20; 22	13; 21
3	(Denmark) (Australia)	Mette Poulsen; Huang Chia-chi	11; 21	5; 21
4	(Denmark) (Australia)	Christinna Pedersen / Kamilla Rytter Juhl; Renuga Veeran / Kate Wilson-Smith	21; 12	21; 19
5	(Denmark) (Australia)	Lena Frier Kristiansen / Marie Røpke; Huang Chia-chi / Tang He Tian	21; 13	21; 16

=== Indonesia vs Denmark ===
Indonesia
5
Putra Indoor Stadium, Court 1
11 May 2010, 12:00 UTC+8

Denmark
0

			1	2	3
1	(Indonesia) (Denmark)	Adriyanti Firdasari; Camilla Sørensen	21; 11	21; 11
2	(Indonesia) (Denmark)	Nitya Krishinda Maheswari / Greysia Polii; Christinna Pedersen / Kamilla Rytter Juhl	13; 21	21; 15	21; 13
3	(Indonesia) (Denmark)	Maria Kristin Yulianti; Karina Jørgensen	21; 9	21; 6
4	(Indonesia) (Denmark)	Shendy Puspa Irawati / Liliyana Natsir; Lena Frier Kristiansen / Marie Røpke	21; 17	21; 17
5	(Indonesia) (Denmark)	Lindaweni Fanetri; Line Damkjær Kruse	21; 6	21; 12

== Group C ==
Pos	Team	Pld	W	L	MF	MA	MD	GF	GA	GD	PF	PA	PD	Pts	Qualification
1	Japan	2	2	0	9	1	+8	18	4	+14	440	325	+115	2	Advance to quarter-finals
2	Russia	2	1	1	4	6	−2	9	13	−4	371	416	−45	1	Advance to quarter-finals
3	Germany	2	0	2	2	8	−6	6	16	−10	358	428	−70	0	

Source: BadmintonCN

=== Japan vs Germany ===
Japan
4
Putra Indoor Stadium, Court 4
9 May 2010, 12:00 UTC+8

Germany
1

			1	2	3
1	(Japan) (Germany)	Eriko Hirose; Juliane Schenk	15; 21	12; 21
2	(Japan) (Germany)	Mizuki Fujii / Reika Kakiiwa; Johanna Goliszewski / Carla Nelte	21; 16	21; 18
3	(Japan) (Germany)	Ai Goto; Karin Schnaase	21; 15	21; 10
4	(Japan) (Germany)	Miyuki Maeda / Satoko Suetsuna; Birgit Overzier / Juliane Schenk	21; 17	18; 21	21; 11
5	(Japan) (Germany)	Yu Hirayama; Fabienne Deprez	21; 16	21; 3

=== Russia vs Germany ===
Russia
4
Putra Indoor Stadium, Court 4
10 May 2010, 12:00 UTC+8

Germany
1

			1	2	3
1	(Russia) (Germany)	Ella Diehl; Juliane Schenk	16; 21	13; 21
2	(Russia) (Germany)	Tatjana Bibik; Karin Schnaase	21; 18	21; 12
3	(Russia) (Germany)	Anastasia Prokopenko; Fabienne Deprez	22; 20	17; 21	21; 19
4	(Russia) (Germany)	Valeria Sorokina / Nina Vislova; Birgit Overzier / Juliane Schenk	21; 17	21; 11
5	(Russia) (Germany)	Ella Diehl / Anastasia Russkikh; Johanna Goliszewski / Carla Nelte	21; 12	21; 17

=== Japan vs Russia ===
Japan
5
Putra Indoor Stadium, Court 4
11 May 2010, 12:00 UTC+8

Russia
0

			1	2	3
1	(Japan) (Russia)	Eriko Hirose; Ella Diehl	21; 18	21; 10
2	(Japan) (Russia)	Miyuki Maeda / Satoko Suetsuna; Valeria Sorokina / Nina Vislova	17; 21	21; 10	21; 16
3	(Japan) (Russia)	Ai Goto; Olga Golovanova	21; 16	21; 10
4	(Japan) (Russia)	Mizuki Fujii / Reika Kakiiwa; Ksenia Polikarpova / Anastasia Russkikh	21; 14	21; 18
5	(Japan) (Russia)	Sayaka Sato; Natalia Perminova	21; 13	21; 10

== Group D ==
Pos	Team	Pld	W	L	MF	MA	MD	GF	GA	GD	PF	PA	PD	Pts	Qualification
1	South Korea	2	2	0	9	1	+8	19	4	+15	475	276	+199	2	Advance to quarter-finals
2	India	2	1	1	6	4	+2	14	9	+5	411	354	+57	1	Advance to quarter-finals
3	South Africa	2	0	2	0	10	−10	0	20	−20	164	420	−256	0	

Source: BadmintonCN

=== South Korea vs South Africa ===
South Korea
5
Putra Indoor Stadium, Court 4
9 May 2010, 18:00 UTC+8

South Africa
0

			1	2	3
1	(South Korea) (South Africa)	Sung Ji-hyun; Kerry-Lee Harrington	21; 9	21; 9
2	(South Korea) (South Africa)	Bae Yeon-ju; Stacey Doubell	21; 8	21; 10
3	(South Korea) (South Africa)	Lee Yun-hwa; Jade Morgan	21; 3	21; 5
4	(South Korea) (South Africa)	Chang Ye-na / Jung Kyung-eun; Michelle Edwards / Kerry-Lee Harrington	21; 8	21; 8
5	(South Korea) (South Africa)	Ha Jung-eun / Kim Min-jung; Stacey Doubell / Jade Morgan	21; 7	21; 8

=== India vs South Africa ===
India
5
Putra Indoor Stadium, Court 4
10 May 2010, 18:00 UTC+8

South Africa
0

			1	2	3
1	(India) (South Africa)	Saina Nehwal; Kerry-Lee Harrington	21; 8	21; 8
2	(India) (South Africa)	Aditi Mutatkar; Stacey Doubell	21; 5	21; 6
3	(India) (South Africa)	Trupti Murgunde; Jade Morgan	21; 10	21; 9
4	(India) (South Africa)	Aparna Balan / Shruti Kurien; Stacey Doubell / Kerry-Lee Harrington	21; 13	21; 10
5	(India) (South Africa)	Jwala Gutta / Ashwini Ponnappa; Michelle Edwards / Jade Morgan	21; 8	21; 12

=== South Korea vs India ===
South Korea
4
Putra Indoor Stadium, Court 4
11 May 2010, 18:00 UTC+8

India
1

			1	2	3
1	(South Korea) (India)	Bae Seung-hee; Saina Nehwal	22; 20	18; 21	17; 21
2	(South Korea) (India)	Kim Min-jung / Lee Hyo-jung; Jwala Gutta / Ashwini Ponnappa	21; 11	21; 13
3	(South Korea) (India)	Sung Ji-hyun; Aditi Mutatkar	21; 23	21; 11	21; 14
4	(South Korea) (India)	Ha Jung-eun / Lee Kyung-won; Aparna Balan / Shruti Kurien	21; 13	21; 11
5	(South Korea) (India)	Lee Yun-hwa; Sayali Gokhale	21; 10	19; 21	21; 12
