= 2010 Thomas Cup group stage =

Badminton results

This article lists the complete results of the group stage of the 2010 Thomas Cup in Kuala Lumpur, Malaysia.

== Draw ==
=== Group composition ===
Group
Group A	Group B	Group C	Group D
China; South Korea; Peru	Japan; Malaysia (Host); Nigeria	Denmark; Germany; Poland	Indonesia; India; Australia

== Group A ==
Pos	Team	Pld	W	L	MF	MA	MD	GF	GA	GD	PF	PA	PD	Pts	Qualification
1	China	2	2	0	9	1	+8	19	2	+17	441	263	+178	2	Advance to quarter-finals
2	South Korea	2	1	1	6	4	+2	12	9	+3	395	343	+52	1	Advance to quarter-finals
3	Peru	2	0	2	0	10	−10	0	20	−20	190	420	−230	0	

Source: BadmintonCN

=== China vs Peru ===
China
5
Putra Indoor Stadium, Court 3
9 May 2010, 12:00 UTC+8

Peru
0

			1	2	3
1	(China) (Peru)	Lin Dan; Antonio de Vinatea	21; 4	21; 6
2	(China) (Peru)	Chen Jin; Andrés Corpancho	21; 9	21; 8
3	(China) (Peru)	Chen Long; Rodrigo Pacheco	21; 11	21; 8
4	(China) (Peru)	Guo Zhendong / Xu Chen; Antonio de Vinatea / Martín del Valle	21; 6	21; 6
5	(China) (Peru)	Chai Biao / Zhang Nan; Andrés Corpancho / Rodrigo Pacheco	21; 12	21; 8

=== South Korea vs Peru ===
South Korea
5
Putra Indoor Stadium, Court 3
10 May 2010, 12:00 UTC+8

Peru
0

			1	2	3
1	(South Korea) (Peru)	Shon Wan-ho; Andrés Corpancho	21; 9	21; 15
2	(South Korea) (Peru)	Cho Gun-woo / Yoo Yeon-seong; Antonio de Vinatea / Martín del Valle	21; 14	21; 10
3	(South Korea) (Peru)	Hong Ji-hoon; Bruno Monteverde	21; 13	21; 13
4	(South Korea) (Peru)	Kim Gi-jung / Shin Baek-cheol; Andrés Corpancho / Mario Cuba	21; 11	21; 14
5	(South Korea) (Peru)	Lee Hyun-il; Rodrigo Pacheco	21; 8	21; 5

=== China vs South Korea ===
China
4
Putra Indoor Stadium, Court 2
11 May 2010, 12:00 UTC+8

South Korea
1

			1	2	3
1	(China) (South Korea)	Lin Dan; Park Sung-hwan	21; 18	25; 23
2	(China) (South Korea)	Cai Yun / Fu Haifeng; Jung Jae-sung / Shin Baek-cheol	21; 11	21; 12
3	(China) (South Korea)	Chen Jin; Son Wan-ho	21; 14	21; 13
4	(China) (South Korea)	Guo Zhendong / Xu Chen; Ko Sung-hyun / Yoo Yeon-seong	19; 21	21; 19	19; 21
5	(China) (South Korea)	Bao Chunlai; Lee Hyun-il	21; 18	21; 15

== Group B ==
Pos	Team	Pld	W	L	MF	MA	MD	GF	GA	GD	PF	PA	PD	Pts	Qualification
1	Japan	2	2	0	8	2	+6	16	5	+11	405	292	+113	2	Advance to quarter-finals
2	Malaysia (H)	2	1	1	7	3	+4	15	6	+9	405	195	+210	1	Advance to quarter-finals
3	Nigeria	2	0	2	0	10	−10	0	20	−20	97	420	−323	0	

Source: BadmintonCN
(H) Host

=== Malaysia vs Nigeria ===
Malaysia
5
Putra Indoor Stadium, Court 3
9 May 2010, 18:00 UTC+8

Nigeria
0

			1	2	3
1	(Malaysia) (Nigeria)	Lee Chong Wei; Ola Fagbemi				w/o
2	(Malaysia) (Nigeria)	Wong Choong Hann; Jinkan Ifraimu				w/o
3	(Malaysia) (Nigeria)	Mohd Fairuzizuan Mohd Tazari / Mohd Zakry Abdul Latif; Ibrahim Adamu / Ocholi Edicha				w/o
4	(Malaysia) (Nigeria)	Muhammad Hafiz Hashim; Enejoh Abah				w/o
5	(Malaysia) (Nigeria)	Koo Kien Keat / Tan Boon Heong; Ola Fagbemi / Jinkan Ifraimu				w/o

=== Japan vs Nigeria ===
Japan
5
Putra Indoor Stadium, Court 3
10 May 2010, 18:00 UTC+8

Nigeria
0

			1	2	3
1	(Japan) (Nigeria)	Kenichi Tago; Ola Fagbemi	21; 10	21; 14
2	(Japan) (Nigeria)	Kenichi Hayakawa / Kenta Kazuno; Ibrahim Adamu / Ocholi Edicha	21; 5	21; 13
3	(Japan) (Nigeria)	Sho Sasaki; Jinkan Ifraimu	21; 4	21; 14
4	(Japan) (Nigeria)	Shōji Satō; Enejoh Abah	21; 9	21; 11
5	(Japan) (Nigeria)	Hirokatsu Hashimoto / Noriyasu Hirata; Ola Fagbemi / Jinkan Ifraimu	21; 4	21; 13

=== Malaysia vs Japan ===
Malaysia
2
Putra Indoor Stadium, Court 1
11 May 2010, 18:00 UTC+8

Japan
3

			1	2	3
1	(Malaysia) (Japan)	Lee Chong Wei; Kenichi Tago	21; 12	21; 13
2	(Malaysia) (Japan)	Koo Kien Keat / Tan Boon Heong; Hirokatsu Hashimoto / Noriyasu Hirata	21; 13	21; 17
3	(Malaysia) (Japan)	Wong Choong Hann; Sho Sasaki	17; 21	18; 21
4	(Malaysia) (Japan)	Mohd Fairuzizuan Mohd Tazari / Mohd Zakry Abdul Latif; Kenichi Hayakawa / Kenta Kazuno	15; 21	12; 21
5	(Malaysia) (Japan)	Muhammad Hafiz Hashim; Shōji Satō	10; 21	21; 14	18; 21

== Group C ==
Pos	Team	Pld	W	L	MF	MA	MD	GF	GA	GD	PF	PA	PD	Pts	Qualification
1	Denmark	2	2	0	9	1	+8	18	2	+16	414	252	+162	2	Advance to quarter-finals
2	Germany	2	1	1	6	4	+2	12	10	+2	374	417	−43	1	Advance to quarter-finals
3	Poland	2	0	2	0	10	−10	2	20	−18	340	459	−119	0	

Source: BadmintonCN

=== Denmark vs Poland ===
Denmark
5
Putra Indoor Stadium, Court 1
9 May 2010, 18:00 UTC+8

Poland
0

			1	2	3
1	(Denmark) (Poland)	Peter Gade; Przemysław Wacha	21; 9	21; 9
2	(Denmark) (Poland)	Mathias Boe / Carsten Mogensen; Adam Cwalina / Michał Łogosz	21; 15	21; 15
3	(Denmark) (Poland)	Jan Ø. Jørgensen; Hubert Pączek	21; 15	21; 16
4	(Denmark) (Poland)	Lars Paaske / Jonas Rasmussen; Łukasz Moreń / Michał Rogalski	21; 11	21; 14
5	(Denmark) (Poland)	Joachim Persson; Rafał Hawel	21; 11	21; 12

=== Germany vs Poland ===
Germany
5
Putra Indoor Stadium, Court 1
10 May 2010, 18:00 UTC+8

Poland
0

			1	2	3
1	(Germany) (Poland)	Marc Zwiebler; Przemysław Wacha	21; 15	26; 24
2	(Germany) (Poland)	Michael Fuchs / Ingo Kindervater; Adam Cwalina / Michał Łogosz	21; 16	21; 19
3	(Germany) (Poland)	Dieter Domke; Michał Rogalski	21; 8	21; 17
4	(Germany) (Poland)	Kristof Hopp / Johannes Schöttler; Łukasz Moreń / Przemysław Wacha	18; 21	21; 17	21; 18
5	(Germany) (Poland)	Marcel Reuter; Hubert Pączek	16; 21	21; 19	21; 18

=== Denmark vs Germany ===
Denmark
4
Putra Indoor Stadium, Court 3
11 May 2010, 18:00 UTC+8

Germany
1

			1	2	3
1	(Denmark) (Germany)	Peter Gade; Marc Zwiebler	21; 12	21; 7
2	(Denmark) (Germany)	Mathias Boe / Carsten Mogensen; Peter Käsbauer / Oliver Roth	21; 8	21; 13
3	(Denmark) (Germany)	Jan Ø. Jørgensen; Dieter Domke	19; 21	17; 21
4	(Denmark) (Germany)	Lars Paaske / Jonas Rasmussen; Ingo Kindervater / Johannes Schöttler	21; 13	21; 15
5	(Denmark) (Germany)	Joachim Persson; Fabian Hammes	21; 3	21; 12

== Group D ==
Pos	Team	Pld	W	L	MF	MA	MD	GF	GA	GD	PF	PA	PD	Pts	Qualification
1	Indonesia	2	2	0	9	1	+8	19	3	+16	439	310	+129	2	Advance to quarter-finals
2	India	2	1	1	5	5	0	11	11	0	398	362	+36	1	Advance to quarter-finals
3	Australia	2	0	2	1	9	−8	2	18	−16	254	419	−165	0	

Source: BadmintonCN

=== Indonesia vs Australia ===
Indonesia
5
Putra Indoor Stadium, Court 2
9 May 2010, 12:00 UTC+8

Australia
0

			1	2	3
1	(Indonesia) (Australia)	Taufik Hidayat; Jeff Tho	21; 12	21; 12
2	(Indonesia) (Australia)	Markis Kido / Hendra Setiawan; Ross Smith / Glenn Warfe	21; 14	24; 22
3	(Indonesia) (Australia)	Simon Santoso; Chad Whitehead	21; 13	21; 4
4	(Indonesia) (Australia)	Mohammad Ahsan / Nova Widianto; Jeff Tho / Raj Veeran	21; 13	21; 6
5	(Indonesia) (Australia)	Dionysius Hayom Rumbaka; Stuart Gomez	21; 12	21; 10

=== Indonesia vs. India ===
Indonesia
4
Putra Indoor Stadium, Court 2
10 May 2010, 12:00 UTC+8

India
1

			1	2	3
1	(Indonesia) (India)	Taufik Hidayat; Kashyap Parupalli	14; 21	21; 19	21; 18
2	(Indonesia) (India)	Markis Kido / Hendra Setiawan; Akshay Dewalkar / Sanave Thomas	21; 11	21; 13
3	(Indonesia) (India)	Sony Dwi Kuncoro; Arvind Bhat	21; 19	9; 21	0; 21	retired
4	(Indonesia) (India)	Hendra Aprida Gunawan / Alvent Yulianto; Valiyaveetil Diju / Rupesh Kumar	14; 21	21; 13	21; 11
5	(Indonesia) (India)	Simon Santoso; Anup Sridhar	21; 8	21; 17

=== India vs. Australia ===
India
4
Putra Indoor Stadium, Court 3
11 May 2010, 12:00 UTC+8

Australia
1

			1	2	3
1	(India) (Australia)	Parupalli Kashyap; Jeff Tho	21; 8	21; 10
2	(India) (Australia)	Arvind Bhat; Chad Whitehead	21; 6	21; 12
3	(India) (Australia)	R. M. V. Gurusaidutt; Stuart Gomez	21; 15	21; 13
4	(India) (Australia)	Rupesh Kumar / Sanave Thomas; Ross Smith / Glenn Warfe	20; 22	18; 21
5	(India) (Australia)	Akshay Dewalkar / Valiyaveetil Diju; Raj Veeran / Chad Whitehead	21; 12	21; 17
