= 2010 Thomas Cup knockout stage =

This article lists the complete results of the knockout stage of the 2010 Thomas Cup in Kuala Lumpur, Malaysia. All times are Malaysia Time (UTC+08:00).

== Qualified teams ==
The top two placed teams from each groups qualified for this stage.

Group	Winners	Runners-up
A	China	South Korea
B	Japan	Malaysia
C	Denmark	Germany
D	Indonesia	India

== Bracket ==
Quarter-finals
China	3
South Korea	0
Denmark	2
Malaysia	3
Germany	1
Japan	3
India	0
Indonesia	3

Semi-finals
China	3
Malaysia	0
Japan	1
Indonesia	3

Final
China	3
Indonesia	0

== Quarter-finals ==
=== China vs South Korea ===
China
3
Putra Indoor Stadium, Court 2
12 May 2010, 12:00 UTC+8

South Korea
0

			1	2	3
1	(China) (South Korea)	Lin Dan; Park Sung-hwan	21; 16	21; 15
2	(China) (South Korea)	Cai Yun / Fu Haifeng; Jung Jae-sung / Shin Baek-cheol	21; 11	21; 16
3	(China) (South Korea)	Chen Jin; Son Wan-ho	21; 15	21; 12
4	(China) (South Korea)	Guo Zhendong / Xu Chen; Ko Sung-hyun / Yoo Yeon-seong				not played
5	(China) (South Korea)	Bao Chunlai; Lee Hyun-il				not played

=== Denmark vs Malaysia ===
Denmark
2
Putra Indoor Stadium, Court 1
12 May 2010, 18:00 UTC+8

Malaysia
3

			1	2	3
1	(Denmark) (Malaysia)	Peter Gade; Lee Chong Wei	17; 21	17; 21
2	(Denmark) (Malaysia)	Mathias Boe / Carsten Mogensen; Koo Kien Keat / Tan Boon Heong	17; 21	19; 21
3	(Denmark) (Malaysia)	Jan Ø. Jørgensen; Wong Choong Hann	22; 20	16; 21	21; 18
4	(Denmark) (Malaysia)	Lars Paaske / Jonas Rasmussen; Hoon Thien How / Mohd Zakry Abdul Latif	24; 26	21; 12	21; 19
5	(Denmark) (Malaysia)	Joachim Persson; Muhammad Hafiz Hashim	12; 21	10; 21

=== Germany vs Japan ===
Germany
1
Putra Indoor Stadium, Court 3
12 May 2010, 18:00 UTC+8

Japan
3

			1	2	3
1	(Germany) (Japan)	Marc Zwiebler; Kenichi Tago	21; 15	18; 21	18; 21
2	(Germany) (Japan)	Michael Fuchs / Kristof Hopp; Hiroyuki Endo / Yoshiteru Hirobe	16; 21	21; 19	24; 22
3	(Germany) (Japan)	Dieter Domke; Sho Sasaki	19; 21	17; 21
4	(Germany) (Japan)	Ingo Kindervater / Johannes Schöttler; Kenichi Hayakawa / Kenta Kazuno	16; 21	16; 21
5	(Germany) (Japan)	Marcel Reuter; Shoji Sato				not played

=== India vs Indonesia ===
India
0
Putra Indoor Stadium, Court 3
12 May 2010, 12:00 UTC+8

Indonesia
3

			1	2	3
1	(India) (Indonesia)	Parupalli Kashyap; Taufik Hidayat	12; 21	21; 10	17; 21
2	(India) (Indonesia)	Akshay Dewalkar / Sanave Thomas; Markis Kido / Hendra Setiawan	16; 21	17; 21
3	(India) (Indonesia)	Arvind Bhat; Simon Santoso	8; 21	10; 21
4	(India) (Indonesia)	Valiyaveetil Diju / Rupesh Kumar; Mohammad Ahsan / Nova Widianto				not played
5	(India) (Indonesia)	R. M. V Gurusaidutt; Dionysius Hayom Rumbaka				not played

== Semi-finals ==
=== China vs Malaysia ===
China
3
Putra Indoor Stadium, Court 1
14 May 2010, 19:00 UTC+8

Malaysia
0

			1	2	3
1	(China) (Malaysia)	Lin Dan; Lee Chong Wei	21; 17	21; 8
2	(China) (Malaysia)	Cai Yun / Fu Haifeng; Koo Kien Keat / Tan Boon Heong	21; 15	21; 10
3	(China) (Malaysia)	Chen Jin; Wong Choong Hann	21; 16	21; 7
4	(China) (Malaysia)	Guo Zhendong / Xu Chen; Hoon Thien How / Mohd Zakry Abdul Latif				not played
5	(China) (Malaysia)	Bao Chunlai; Muhammad Hafiz Hashim				not played

=== Japan vs Indonesia ===
Japan
1
Putra Indoor Stadium, Court 1
14 May 2010, 14:30 UTC+8

Indonesia
3

			1	2	3
1	(Japan) (Indonesia)	Kenichi Tago; Taufik Hidayat	9; 21	14; 21
2	(Japan) (Indonesia)	Kenichi Hayakawa / Kenta Kazuno; Markis Kido / Hendra Setiawan	9; 21	11; 21
3	(Japan) (Indonesia)	Sho Sasaki; Simon Santoso	21; 19	13; 21	21; 11
4	(Japan) (Indonesia)	Hiroyuki Endo / Noriyasu Hirata; Nova Widianto / Alvent Yulianto	14; 21	20; 22
5	(Japan) (Indonesia)	Shōji Satō; Dionysius Hayom Rumbaka				not played

== Final ==
=== China vs Indonesia ===
China
3
Putra Indoor Stadium, Court 1
16 May 2010, 14:00 UTC+8

Indonesia
0

			1	2	3
1	(China) (Indonesia)	Lin Dan; Taufik Hidayat	21; 7	21; 14
2	(China) (Indonesia)	Cai Yun / Fu Haifeng; Markis Kido / Hendra Setiawan	25; 23	16; 21	21; 12
3	(China) (Indonesia)	Chen Jin; Simon Santoso	19; 21	21; 17	21; 7
4	(China) (Indonesia)	Guo Zhendong / Xu Chen; Nova Widianto / Alvent Yulianto				not played
5	(China) (Indonesia)	Bao Chunlai; Dionysius Hayom Rumbaka				not played
