= 2018 Uber Cup group stage =

This article lists the fixtures of the group stage for the 2018 Uber Cup in Bangkok, Thailand.

All times Thailand Standard Time (UTC+07:00)

== Group A ==
=== Teams ===
Draw position	Team	Confederation	Method of qualification	Date of qualification	Finals appearance	Last appearance	Previous best performance
A1 (seed)	Japan	Badminton Asia	2018 Asia Team Championships winners	9 February 2018	24th	2016	Champions (5 times)
A2	India	Badminton Asia	Best world team rankings	18 February 2018	6th	2016	Semi-final (2014, 2016)
A3	Canada	Badminton Pan Am	2018 Pan Am Championships winners	18 February 2018	11th	2014	Group stage (2004, 2014)
A4	Australia	Badminton Oceania	2018 Oceania Championships winners	7 February 2018	8th	2016	Group stage (5 times)

=== Standings ===
Pos	Team	Pld	W	L	GF	GA	GD	PF	PA	PD	Pts	Qualification
1	Japan	3	3	0	30	1	+29	643	363	+280	3	Advance to Quarter-finals
2	Canada	3	2	1	16	16	0	566	556	+10	2	Advance to Quarter-finals
3	India	3	1	2	12	20	−8	521	585	−64	1	
4	Australia	3	0	3	5	26	−21	410	636	−226	0	

Source: BWF

=== Matches ===
==== Japan vs Australia ====
Japan
5
IMPACT Arena Court 3
20 May 2018

Australia
0

			1	2	3
1	(Japan) (Australia)	Akane Yamaguchi; Wendy Chen	24; 22	21; 19
2	(Japan) (Australia)	Yuki Fukushima / Sayaka Hirota; Gronya Somerville / Renuga Veeran	21; 9	21; 8
3	(Japan) (Australia)	Nozomi Okuhara; Louisa Ma	21; 6	21; 6
4	(Japan) (Australia)	Misaki Matsutomo / Ayaka Takahashi; Lee Yen Khoo / Ann-Louise Slee	21; 3	21; 4
5	(Japan) (Australia)	Sayaka Sato; Lauren Lim	21; 9	21; 6

==== India vs Canada ====
India
1
IMPACT Arena Court 3
20 May 2018

Canada
4

			1	2	3
1	(India) (Canada)	Saina Nehwal; Michelle Li	21; 15	16; 21	16; 21
2	(India) (Canada)	Vaishnavi Reddy Jakka; Rachel Honderich	11; 21	13; 21
3	(India) (Canada)	Meghana Jakkampudi / Poorvisha S Ram; Michelle Tong / Josephine Wu	21; 19	21; 15
4	(India) (Canada)	Sri Krishna Priya Kudaravalli; Brittney Tam	11; 21	15; 21
5	(India) (Canada)	Sanyogita Ghorpade / Prajakta Sawant; Rachel Honderich / Kristen Tsai	15; 21	16; 21

==== Japan vs Canada ====
Japan
5
IMPACT Arena Court 1
21 May 2018

Canada
0

			1	2	3
1	(Japan) (Canada)	Nozomi Okuhara; Michelle Li	21; 16	21; 17
2	(Japan) (Canada)	Yuki Fukushima / Sayaka Hirota; Rachel Honderich / Kristen Tsai	21; 14	21; 9
3	(Japan) (Canada)	Sayaka Sato; Brittney Tam	21; 14	21; 14
4	(Japan) (Canada)	Shiho Tanaka / Koharu Yonemoto; Anne-Julie Beaulieu / Stéphanie Pakenham	21; 5	21; 13
5	(Japan) (Canada)	Sayaka Takahashi; Catherine Choi	21; 10	21; 11

==== India vs Australia ====
India
4
IMPACT Arena Court 1
21 May 2018

Australia
1

			1	2	3
1	(India) (Australia)	Saina Nehwal; Wendy Chen	21; 14	21; 19
2	(India) (Australia)	Meghana Jakkampudi / Poorvisha S. Ram; Gronya Somerville / Renuga Veeran	13; 21	16; 21
3	(India) (Australia)	Vaishnavi Reddy Jakka; Jennifer Tam	21; 17	21; 13
4	(India) (Australia)	Sanyogita Ghorpade / Prajakta Sawant; Louisa Ma / Ann-Louise Slee	21; 19	21; 11
5	(India) (Australia)	Anura Prabhudesai; Zecily Fung	21; 6	21; 7

==== Japan vs India ====
Japan
5
IMPACT Arena Court 1
23 May 2018

India
0

			1	2	3
1	(Japan) (India)	Akane Yamaguchi; Saina Nehwal	21; 19	9; 21	22; 20
2	(Japan) (India)	Misaki Matsutomo / Ayaka Takahashi; Sanyogita Ghorpade / Prajakta Sawant	21; 15	21; 6
3	(Japan) (India)	Nozomi Okuhara; Vaishnavi Reddy Jakka	21; 10	21; 13
4	(Japan) (India)	Shiho Tanaka / Koharu Yonemoto; Vaishnavi Bhale / Meghana Jakkampudi	21; 8	21; 17
5	(Japan) (India)	Sayaka Takahashi; Anura Prabhudesai	21; 12	21; 7

==== Canada vs Australia ====
Canada
4
IMPACT Arena Court 3
23 May 2018

Australia
1

			1	2	3
1	(Canada) (Australia)	Michelle Li; Wendy Chen	19; 21	21; 16	21; 19
2	(Canada) (Australia)	Rachel Honderich; Jennifer Tam	21; 9	21; 9
3	(Canada) (Australia)	Michelle Tong / Josephine Wu; Gronya Somerville / Renuga Veeran	18; 21	16; 21
4	(Canada) (Australia)	Brittney Tam; Lauren Lim	21; 9	21; 5
5	(Canada) (Australia)	Rachel Honderich / Kristen Tsai; Louisa Ma / Ann-Louise Slee	26; 24	21; 16

== Group B ==
=== Teams ===
Draw position	Team	Confederation	Method of qualification	Date of qualification	Finals appearance	Last appearance	Previous best performance
B1 (seed)	Thailand	Badminton Asia	Hosts	18 March 2017	6th	2016	Semi-final (2012)
B2	Chinese Taipei	Badminton Asia	2018 Asia Team Championships best quarter-finalist	9 February 2018	6th	2016	Semi-final (2006)
B3	Germany	Badminton Europe	2018 European Team Championships semi-finalist	16 February 2018	9th	2016	Semi-final (2006, 2008)
B4	Hong Kong	Badminton Asia	Best world team rankings	18 February 2018	8th	2016	Semi-final (2002)

=== Standings ===
Pos	Team	Pld	W	L	GF	GA	GD	PF	PA	PD	Pts	Qualification
1	Thailand (H)	3	3	0	27	6	+21	650	481	+169	3	Advance to Quarter-finals
2	Chinese Taipei	3	2	1	24	12	+12	695	604	+91	2	Advance to Quarter-finals
3	Hong Kong	3	1	2	12	23	−11	580	667	−87	1	
4	Germany	3	0	3	6	28	−22	512	685	−173	0	

Source: BWF
(H) Host

=== Matches ===
==== Chinese Taipei vs Hong Kong ====
Chinese Taipei
4
IMPACT Arena Court 3
20 May 2018

Hong Kong
1

			1	2	3
1	(Chinese Taipei) (Hong Kong)	Tai Tzu-ying; Cheung Ngan Yi	21; 18	20; 22	21; 11
2	(Chinese Taipei) (Hong Kong)	Hsu Ya-ching / Wu Ti-jung; Ng Wing Yung / Yeung Nga Ting	21; 14	10; 21	19; 21
3	(Chinese Taipei) (Hong Kong)	Pai Yu-po; Yip Pui Yin	21; 16	21; 17
4	(Chinese Taipei) (Hong Kong)	Chen Hsiao-huan / Hu Ling-fang; Ng Tsz Yau / Yuen Sin Ying	21; 23	21; 16	21; 13
5	(Chinese Taipei) (Hong Kong)	Chiang Mei-hui; Yeung Sum Yee	21; 10	22; 20

==== Thailand vs Germany ====
Thailand
5
IMPACT Arena Court 1
20 May 2018

Germany
0

			1	2	3
1	(Thailand) (Germany)	Ratchanok Intanon; Luise Heim	21; 12	21; 16
2	(Thailand) (Germany)	Jongkolphan Kititharakul / Rawinda Prajongjai; Isabel Herttrich / Carla Nelte	21; 14	13; 21	21; 10
3	(Thailand) (Germany)	Nitchaon Jindapol; Yvonne Li	21; 12	21; 18
4	(Thailand) (Germany)	Puttita Supajirakul / Sapsiree Taerattanachai; Johanna Goliszewski / Lara Käpplein	21; 14	21; 12
5	(Thailand) (Germany)	Busanan Ongbamrungphan; Fabienne Deprez	21; 13	21; 8

==== Thailand vs Hong Kong ====
Thailand
5
IMPACT Arena Court 2
21 May 2018

Hong Kong
0

			1	2	3
1	(Thailand) (Hong Kong)	Ratchanok Intanon; Cheung Ngan Yi	21; 10	21; 16
2	(Thailand) (Hong Kong)	Jongkolphan Kititharakul / Rawinda Prajongjai; Ng Wing Yung / Yeung Nga Ting	21; 14	21; 14
3	(Thailand) (Hong Kong)	Nitchaon Jindapol; Cheung Ying Mei	21; 12	21; 12
4	(Thailand) (Hong Kong)	Puttita Supajirakul / Sapsiree Taerattanachai; Ng Tsz Yau / Poon Lok Yan	21; 12	21; 10
5	(Thailand) (Hong Kong)	Busanan Ongbamrungphan; Yeung Sum Yee	21; 14	21; 14

==== Chinese Taipei vs Germany ====
Chinese Taipei
5
IMPACT Arena Court 3
22 May 2018

Germany
0

			1	2	3
1	(Chinese Taipei) (Germany)	Tai Tzu-ying; Luise Heim	21; 15	21; 12
2	(Chinese Taipei) (Germany)	Chen Hsiao-huan / Hsu Ya-ching; Isabel Herttrich / Carla Nelte	21; 15	21; 12
3	(Chinese Taipei) (Germany)	Pai Yu-po; Yvonne Li	21; 12	21; 10
4	(Chinese Taipei) (Germany)	Kuo Yu-wen / Lin Wan-ching; Johanna Goliszewski / Lara Käpplein	21; 17	21; 17
5	(Chinese Taipei) (Germany)	Lin Ying-chun; Fabienne Deprez	20; 22	21; 12	23; 21

==== Thailand vs Chinese Taipei ====
Thailand
3
IMPACT Arena Court 2
23 May 2018

Chinese Taipei
2

			1	2	3
1	(Thailand) (Chinese Taipei)	Ratchanok Intanon; Tai Tzu-ying	21; 19	8; 21	11; 21
2	(Thailand) (Chinese Taipei)	Jongkolphan Kititharakul / Rawinda Prajongjai; Hu Ling-fang / Wu Ti-jung	21; 8	21; 10
3	(Thailand) (Chinese Taipei)	Nitchaon Jindapol; Pai Yu-po	11; 21	21; 19	21; 11
4	(Thailand) (Chinese Taipei)	Puttita Supajirakul / Sapsiree Taerattanachai; Chen Hsiao-huan / Hsu Ya-ching	21; 14	21; 15
5	(Thailand) (Chinese Taipei)	Pornpawee Chochuwong; Chiang Mei-hui	19; 21	21; 23

==== Hong Kong vs Germany ====
Hong Kong
4
IMPACT Arena Court 4
23 May 2018

Germany
1

			1	2	3
1	(Hong Kong) (Germany)	Cheung Ngan Yi; Luise Heim	21; 13	21; 7
2	(Hong Kong) (Germany)	Ng Wing Yung / Yeung Nga Ting; Isabel Herttrich / Carla Nelte	17; 21	21; 13	21; 18
3	(Hong Kong) (Germany)	Yip Pui Yin; Yvonne Li	21; 15	21; 18
4	(Hong Kong) (Germany)	Ng Tsz Yau / Wu Yi Ting; Linda Efler / Olga Konon	21; 10	20; 22	21; 18
5	(Hong Kong) (Germany)	Yeung Sum Yee; Fabienne Deprez	16; 21	9; 21

== Group C ==
=== Teams ===
Draw position	Team	Confederation	Method of qualification	Date of qualification	Finals appearance	Last appearance	Previous best performance
C1 (seed)	South Korea	Badminton Asia	2018 Asia Team Championships best semi-finalist	9 February 2018	18th	2016	Champions (2010)
C2	Denmark	Badminton Europe	2018 European Team Championships semi-finalist	16 February 2018	20th	2016	Runner-up (1957, 1960, 2000)
C3	Russia	Badminton Europe	2018 European Team Championships semi-finalist	16 February 2018	5th	2016	Quarter final (2010)
C4	Mauritius	BCA	2018 All Africa Team Championships winners	15 February 2018	2nd	2016	Group stage (2016)

=== Standings ===
Pos	Team	Pld	W	L	GF	GA	GD	PF	PA	PD	Pts	Qualification
1	South Korea	3	3	0	26	5	+21	635	374	+261	3	Advance to Quarter-finals
2	Denmark	3	2	1	23	11	+12	650	486	+164	2	Advance to Quarter-finals
3	Russia	3	1	2	16	19	−3	593	613	−20	1	
4	Mauritius	3	0	3	0	30	−30	225	630	−405	0	

Source: BWF

=== Matches ===
==== Korea vs Mauritius ====
South Korea
5
IMPACT Arena Court 4
20 May 2018

Mauritius
0

			1	2	3
1	(South Korea) (Mauritius)	Lee Jang-mi; Kate Foo Kune	21; 11	21; 10
2	(South Korea) (Mauritius)	Lee Se-yeon; Aurelie Allet	21; 11	21; 10
3	(South Korea) (Mauritius)	An Se-young; Kobita Dookhee	21; 6	21; 6
4	(South Korea) (Mauritius)	Baek Ha-na / Lee Yu-lim; Jemimah Leug For Sang / Ganesha Mungrah	21; 2	21; 3
5	(South Korea) (Mauritius)	Kim Hye-rin / Kong Hee-yong; Aurelie Allet / Kobita Dookhee	21; 3	21; 4

==== Denmark vs Russia ====
Denmark
4
IMPACT Arena Court 2
20 May 2018

Russia
1

			1	2	3
1	(Denmark) (Russia)	Mia Blichfeldt; Evgeniya Kosetskaya	21; 12	19; 21	21; 14
2	(Denmark) (Russia)	Maiken Fruergaard / Sara Thygesen; Ekaterina Bolotova / Alina Davletova	22; 20	20; 22	21; 18
3	(Denmark) (Russia)	Line Kjærsfeldt; Natalia Perminova	21; 15	17; 21	21; 6
4	(Denmark) (Russia)	Julie Finne-Ipsen / Rikke Søby Hansen; Evgeniya Kosetskaya / Olga Morozova	14; 21	21; 19	16; 21
5	(Denmark) (Russia)	Natalia Koch Rohde; Anastasiia Pustinskaia	21; 16	21; 13

==== Denmark vs Mauritius ====
Denmark
5
IMPACT Arena Court 3
21 May 2018

Mauritius
0

			1	2	3
1	(Denmark) (Mauritius)	Line Kjærsfeldt; Kate Foo Kune	21; 7	21; 12
2	(Denmark) (Mauritius)	Natalia Koch Rohde; Aurelie Allet	21; 6	21; 6
3	(Denmark) (Mauritius)	Line Christophersen; Kobita Dookhee	21; 1	21; 7
4	(Denmark) (Mauritius)	Julie Finne-Ipsen / Rikke Søby Hansen; Jemimah Leug For Sang / Ganesha Mungrah	21; 8	21; 2
5	(Denmark) (Mauritius)	Maiken Fruergaard / Sara Thygesen; Aurelie Allet / Kobita Dookhee				w/o

==== Korea vs Russia ====
South Korea
5
IMPACT Arena Court 4
21 May 2018

Russia
0

			1	2	3
1	(South Korea) (Russia)	Sung Ji-hyun; Evgeniya Kosetskaya	21; 16	21; 12
2	(South Korea) (Russia)	Kim So-yeong / Shin Seung-chan; Alina Davletova / Olga Morozova	21; 16	21; 12
3	(South Korea) (Russia)	Lee Se-yeon; Natalia Perminova	21; 9	17; 21	21; 9
4	(South Korea) (Russia)	Kim Hye-rin / Kong Hee-yong; Ekaterina Bolotova / Evgeniya Kosetskaya	21; 14	21; 13
5	(South Korea) (Russia)	An Se-young; Anastasiia Pustinskaia	21; 14	21; 8

==== Korea vs Denmark ====
South Korea
3
IMPACT Arena Court 2
22 May 2018

Denmark
2

			1	2	3
1	(South Korea) (Denmark)	Sung Ji-hyun; Mia Blichfeldt	21; 13	21; 12
2	(South Korea) (Denmark)	Kim So-yeong / Shin Seung-chan; Maiken Fruergaard / Sara Thygesen	17; 21	19; 21
3	(South Korea) (Denmark)	Lee Jang-mi; Line Kjærsfeldt	18; 21	18; 21
4	(South Korea) (Denmark)	Baek Ha-na / Lee Yu-rim; Julie Finne-Ipsen / Rikke Søby Hansen	21; 14	21; 13
5	(South Korea) (Denmark)	An Se-young; Line Christophersen	21; 16	21; 12

==== Russia vs Mauritius ====
Russia
5
IMPACT Arena Court 4
22 May 2018

Mauritius
0

			1	2	3
1	(Russia) (Mauritius)	Evgeniya Kosetskaya; Kate Foo Kune	21; 19	21; 19
2	(Russia) (Mauritius)	Natalia Perminova; Aurelie Allet	21; 4	21; 19
3	(Russia) (Mauritius)	Anastasiia Pustinskaia; Kobita Dookhee	21; 6	21; 10
4	(Russia) (Mauritius)	Evgeniya Kosetskaya / Olga Morozova; Jemimah Leug For Sang / Ganesha Mungrah	21; 1	21; 11
5	(Russia) (Mauritius)	Ekaterina Bolotova / Alina Davletova; Aurelie Allet / Kobita Dookhee	21; 13	21; 8

== Group D ==
=== Teams ===
Draw position	Team	Confederation	Method of qualification	Date of qualification	Finals appearance	Last appearance	Previous best performance
D1 (seed)	China	Badminton Asia	2016 Uber Cup winners	22 May 2016	18th	2016	Champions (14 times)
D2	Indonesia	Badminton Asia	2018 Asia Team Championships	9 February 2018	24th	2016	Champions (1975, 1994, 1996)
D3	France	Badminton Europe	Best world team rankings for Europe	18 February 2018	1st	Debut	Debut
D4	Malaysia	Badminton Asia	Best world team rankings	18 February 2018	12th	2016	Quarter-final (2010)

=== Standings ===
Pos	Team	Pld	W	L	GF	GA	GD	PF	PA	PD	Pts	Qualification
1	China	3	3	0	26	7	+19	661	507	+154	3	Advance to Quarter-finals
2	Indonesia	3	2	1	22	13	+9	675	619	+56	2	Advance to Quarter-finals
3	Malaysia	3	1	2	18	20	−2	700	679	+21	1	
4	France	3	0	3	4	30	−26	469	700	−231	0	

Source: BWF

=== Matches ===
==== China vs France ====
China
5
IMPACT Arena Court 4
21 May 2018

France
0

			1	2	3
1	(China) (France)	He Bingjiao; Yaëlle Hoyaux	21; 14	21; 13
2	(China) (France)	Huang Dongping / Zheng Yu; Émilie Lefel / Anne Tran	21; 19	21; 9
3	(China) (France)	Gao Fangjie; Marie Batomene	21; 8	21; 10
4	(China) (France)	Huang Yaqiong / Tang Jinhua; Delphine Delrue / Léa Palermo	21; 8	21; 14
5	(China) (France)	Li Xuerui; Katia Normand	21; 9	21; 13

==== Indonesia vs Malaysia ====
Indonesia
3
IMPACT Arena Court 2
21 May 2018

Malaysia
2

			1	2	3
1	(Indonesia) (Malaysia)	Fitriani; Soniia Cheah	21; 10	17; 21	14; 21
2	(Indonesia) (Malaysia)	Greysia Polii / Apriyani Rahayu; Goh Yea Ching / Lee Meng Yean	21; 13	21; 14
3	(Indonesia) (Malaysia)	Gregoria Mariska Tunjung; Goh Jin Wei	22; 20	21; 16
4	(Indonesia) (Malaysia)	Della Destiara Haris / Rizki Amelia Pradipta; Chow Mei Kuan / Vivian Hoo	24; 22	20; 22	21; 12
5	(Indonesia) (Malaysia)	Ruselli Hartawan; Kisona Selvaduray	23; 21	21; 23	13; 21

==== China vs Malaysia ====
China
4
IMPACT Arena Court 1
22 May 2018

Malaysia
1

			1	2	3
1	(China) (Malaysia)	Chen Yufei; Soniia Cheah	18; 21	22; 20	21; 18
2	(China) (Malaysia)	Chen Qingchen / Jia Yifan; Goh Yea Ching / Soong Fie Cho	21; 9	21; 8
3	(China) (Malaysia)	He Bingjiao; Goh Jin Wei	9; 21	21; 17	13; 21
4	(China) (Malaysia)	Huang Dongping / Zheng Yu; Chow Mei Kuan / Vivian Hoo	21; 19	21; 15
5	(China) (Malaysia)	Gao Fangjie; Lee Ying Ying	21; 16	21; 15

==== Indonesia vs France ====
Indonesia
5
IMPACT Arena Court 4
22 May 2018

France
0

			1	2	3
1	(Indonesia) (France)	Gregoria Mariska Tunjung; Yaëlle Hoyaux	21; 9	21; 8
2	(Indonesia) (France)	Della Destiara Haris / Ni Ketut Mahadewi Istarani; Émilie Lefel / Anne Tran	21; 10	21; 16
3	(Indonesia) (France)	Dinar Dyah Ayustine; Marie Batomene	21; 17	21; 10
4	(Indonesia) (France)	Nitya Krishinda Maheswari / Apriyani Rahayu; Delphine Delrue / Léa Palermo	16; 21	21; 19	21; 19
5	(Indonesia) (France)	Ruselli Hartawan; Katia Normand	21; 17	21; 16

==== China vs Indonesia ====
China
3
IMPACT Arena Court 2
23 May 2018

Indonesia
2

			1	2	3
1	(China) (Indonesia)	Chen Yufei; Fitriani	21; 10	21; 15
2	(China) (Indonesia)	Chen Qingchen / Jia Yifan; Greysia Polii / Apriyani Rahayu	21; 13	21; 19
3	(China) (Indonesia)	Gao Fangjie; Gregoria Mariska Tunjung	21; 23	16; 21
4	(China) (Indonesia)	Huang Yaqiong / Tang Jinhua; Della Destiara Haris / Rizki Amelia Pradipta	21; 16	21; 16
5	(China) (Indonesia)	Li Xuerui; Ruselli Hartawan	21; 15	19; 21	18; 21

==== Malaysia vs France ====
Malaysia
5
IMPACT Arena Court 4
23 May 2018

France
0

			1	2	3
1	(Malaysia) (France)	Goh Jin Wei; Yaëlle Hoyaux	21; 7	21; 0
2	(Malaysia) (France)	Chow Mei Kuan / Lee Meng Yean; Émilie Lefel / Anne Tran	21; 14	21; 17
3	(Malaysia) (France)	Lee Ying Ying; Marie Batomene	15; 21	21; 16	21; 11
4	(Malaysia) (France)	Vivian Hoo / Tee Jing Yi; Delphine Delrue / Léa Palermo	21; 13	15; 21	28; 26
5	(Malaysia) (France)	Kisona Selvaduray; Katia Normand	17; 21	21; 14	21; 9
