= 2018 Thomas Cup group stage =

This article lists the fixtures of the group stage for the 2018 Thomas Cup in Bangkok, Thailand.

All times Thailand Standard Time (UTC+07:00)

== Group A ==
=== Teams ===
Draw position	Team	Confederation	Method of qualification	Date of qualification	Finals appearance	Last appearance	Previous best performance
A1 (seed)	China	Badminton Asia	2018 Asia Team Championships finalist	9 February 2018	19th	2016	Champions (9 times)
A2	India	Badminton Asia	Best world team rankings	18 February 2018	12th	2016	Quarter-final (2006, 2010)
A3	France	Badminton Europe	Best world team rankings for Europe	18 February 2018	3rd	2016	Quarter-final (2010)
A4	Australia	Badminton Oceania	2018 Oceania Championships winners	7 February 2018	4th	2010	Group stage (2010)

=== Standings ===
Pos	Team	Pld	W	L	GF	GA	GD	PF	PA	PD	Pts	Qualification
1	China	3	3	0	30	3	+27	681	416	+265	3	Advance to Quarter-finals
2	France	3	2	1	18	14	+4	566	532	+34	2	Advance to Quarter-finals
3	India	3	1	2	17	19	−2	618	632	−14	1	
4	Australia	3	0	3	1	30	−29	365	650	−285	0	

Source: BWF

=== Matches ===
==== India vs France ====
India
1
IMPACT Arena Court 1
20 May 2018

France
4

			1	2	3
1	(India) (France)	B. Sai Praneeth; Brice Leverdez	21; 17	21; 18
2	(India) (France)	Arjun M.R. / Ramchandran Shlok; Bastian Kersaudy / Julien Maio	13; 21	16; 21
3	(India) (France)	Sameer Verma; Lucas Corvée	18; 21	22; 20	18; 21
4	(India) (France)	Arun George / Sanyam Shukla; Thom Gicquel / Ronan Labar	10; 21	12; 21
5	(India) (France)	Lakshya Sen; Toma Junior Popov	20; 22	21; 19	19; 21

==== China vs Australia ====
China
5
IMPACT Arena Court 4
20 May 2018

Australia
0

			1	2	3
1	(China) (Australia)	Chen Long; Anthony Joe	21; 14	21; 11
2	(China) (Australia)	Liu Cheng / Zhang Nan; Matthew Chau / Sawan Serasinghe	21; 18	21; 17
3	(China) (Australia)	Shi Yuqi; Ashwant Gobinathan	21; 9	21; 4
4	(China) (Australia)	Wang Yilü / Zheng Siwei; Raymond Tam / Eric Vuong	21; 10	21; 8
5	(China) (Australia)	Qiao Bin; Peter Yan	21; 13	21; 12

==== China vs France ====
China
5
IMPACT Arena Court 1
21 May 2018

France
0

			1	2	3
1	(China) (France)	Chen Long; Brice Leverdez	21; 17	21; 5
2	(China) (France)	Liu Cheng / Zhang Nan; Thom Gicquel / Ronan Labar	21; 15	21; 16
3	(China) (France)	Shi Yuqi; Lucas Corvée	21; 9	21; 12
4	(China) (France)	Li Junhui / Liu Yuchen; Bastian Kersaudy / Toma Junior Popov	21; 7	21; 12
5	(China) (France)	Lin Dan; Arnaud Merklé	21; 13	21; 17

==== India vs Australia ====
India
5
IMPACT Arena Court 3
21 May 2018

Australia
0

			1	2	3
1	(India) (Australia)	Prannoy Kumar; Anthony Joe	21; 19	21; 13
2	(India) (Australia)	Arjun M.R. / Ramchandran Shlok; Matthew Chau / Sawan Serasinghe	21; 11	21; 15
3	(India) (Australia)	B. Sai Praneeth; Jacob Schueler	21; 9	21; 6
4	(India) (Australia)	Arun George / Sanyam Shukla; Simon Leung / Raymond Tam	21; 16	20; 22	21; 8
5	(India) (Australia)	Lakshya Sen; Kai Chen Teoh	21; 5	21; 14

==== China vs India ====
China
5
IMPACT Arena Court 2
22 May 2018

India
0

			1	2	3
1	(China) (India)	Chen Long; H. S. Prannoy	21; 9	21; 9
2	(China) (India)	Liu Cheng / Zhang Nan; Arjun M.R. / Ramchandran Shlok	21; 12	21; 15
3	(China) (India)	Shi Yuqi; B. Sai Praneeth	21; 9	15; 21	21; 12
4	(China) (India)	Li Junhui / Liu Yuchen; Arun George / Sanyam Shukla	21; 15	20; 22	21; 15
5	(China) (India)	Lin Dan; Lakshya Sen	16; 21	21; 9	21; 8

==== France vs Australia ====
France
5
IMPACT Arena Court 4
22 May 2018

Australia
0

			1	2	3
1	(France) (Australia)	Brice Leverdez; Ashwant Gobinathan	21; 5	21; 7
2	(France) (Australia)	Bastian Kersaudy / Julien Maio; Matthew Chau / Sawan Serasinghe	21; 17	21; 12
3	(France) (Australia)	Lucas Corvée; Jacob Schueler	21; 14	21; 9
4	(France) (Australia)	Thom Gicquel / Ronan Labar; Simon Leung / Eric Vuong	21; 9	21; 16
5	(France) (Australia)	Toma Junior Popov; Peter Yan	21; 7	21; 15

== Group B ==
=== Teams ===
Draw position	Team	Confederation	Method of qualification	Date of qualification	Finals appearance	Last appearance	Previous best performance
B1 (seed)	Indonesia	Badminton Asia	2018 Asia Team Championships winners	9 February 2018	27th	2016	Champions (13 times)
B2	South Korea	Badminton Asia	2018 Asia Team Championships semi-finalist	9 February 2018	18th	2016	Runners-up (2008, 2012)
B3	Canada	Badminton Pan Am	2018 Pan Am Championships winners	18 February 2018	6th	2008	Group stage (2008)
B4	Thailand	Badminton Asia	Hosts	7 February 2018	13th	2016	Runners-up (1961)

=== Standings ===
Pos	Team	Pld	W	L	GF	GA	GD	PF	PA	PD	Pts	Qualification
1	Indonesia	3	3	0	25	10	+15	700	532	+168	3	Advance to Quarter-finals
2	South Korea	3	2	1	22	15	+7	685	644	+41	2	Advance to Quarter-finals
3	Thailand (H)	3	1	2	20	15	+5	645	641	+4	1	
4	Canada	3	0	3	2	29	−27	414	627	−213	0	

Source: BWF
(H) Host

=== Matches ===
==== Indonesia vs Canada ====
Indonesia
5
IMPACT Arena Court 4
20 May 2018

Canada
0

			1	2	3
1	(Indonesia) (Canada)	Anthony Sinisuka Ginting; Jason Ho-Shue	21; 11	21; 18
2	(Indonesia) (Canada)	Mohammad Ahsan / Hendra Setiawan; Jonathan Lai / Duncan Yao	21; 8	21; 15
3	(Indonesia) (Canada)	Ihsan Maulana Mustofa; Antonio Li	21; 6	21; 8
4	(Indonesia) (Canada)	Fajar Alfian / Muhammad Rian Ardianto; Jason Ho-Shue / Nyl Yakura	21; 17	21; 14
5	(Indonesia) (Canada)	Firman Abdul Kholik; Paul-Antoine Dostie-Guindon	21; 8	21; 11

==== Korea vs Thailand ====
South Korea
3
IMPACT Arena Court 1
20 May 2018

Thailand
2

			1	2	3
1	(South Korea) (Thailand)	Son Wan-ho; Suppanyu Avihingsanon	19; 21	21; 12	21; 16
2	(South Korea) (Thailand)	Chung Eui-seok / Kim Duk-young; Tinn Isriyanet / Kittisak Namdash	21; 18	19; 21	21; 17
3	(South Korea) (Thailand)	Heo Kwang-hee; Kantaphon Wangcharoen	19; 21	15; 21
4	(South Korea) (Thailand)	Kang Min-hyuk / Kim Won-ho; Kittinupong Kedren / Dechapol Puavaranukroh	18; 21	21; 19	21; 17
5	(South Korea) (Thailand)	Ha Young-woong; Pannawit Thongnuam	16; 21	19; 21

==== Korea vs Canada ====
South Korea
4
IMPACT Arena Court 4
21 May 2018

Canada
1

			1	2	3
1	(South Korea) (Canada)	Lee Dong-keun; Jason Ho-Shue	21; 10	21; 10
2	(South Korea) (Canada)	Choi Sol-gyu / Seo Seung-jae; Ty Alexander Lindeman / Duncan Yao	21; 12	21; 10
3	(South Korea) (Canada)	Heo Kwang-hee; Antonio Li	21; 17	21; 13
4	(South Korea) (Canada)	Kang Min-hyuk / Kim Won-ho; Jason Ho-Shue / Nyl Yakura	21; 16	18; 21	0; 1	retired
5	(South Korea) (Canada)	Ha Young-woong; Paul-Antoine Dostie-Guindon	21; 8	21; 6

==== Indonesia vs Thailand ====
Indonesia
4
IMPACT Arena Court 1
22 May 2018

Thailand
1

			1	2	3
1	(Indonesia) (Thailand)	Anthony Sinisuka Ginting; Khosit Phetpradab	21; 8	21; 14
2	(Indonesia) (Thailand)	Marcus Fernaldi Gideon / Kevin Sanjaya Sukamuljo; Kittisak Namdash / Nipitphon Phuangphuapet	16; 21	21; 13	12; 21
3	(Indonesia) (Thailand)	Ihsan Maulana Mustofa; Kantaphon Wangcharoen	16; 21	21; 8	24; 22
4	(Indonesia) (Thailand)	Fajar Alfian / Muhammad Rian Ardianto; Tinn Isriyanet / Dechapol Puavaranukroh	21; 10	21; 18
5	(Indonesia) (Thailand)	Firman Abdul Kholik; Pannawit Thongnuam	21; 19	21; 14

==== Indonesia vs Korea ====
Indonesia
3
IMPACT Arena Court 2
23 May 2018

South Korea
2

			1	2	3
1	(Indonesia) (South Korea)	Anthony Sinisuka Ginting; Son Wan-ho	20; 22	20; 22
2	(Indonesia) (South Korea)	Marcus Fernaldi Gideon / Kevin Sanjaya Sukamuljo; Chung Eui-seok / Kim Won-ho	21; 11	14; 21	21; 10
3	(Indonesia) (South Korea)	Jonatan Christie; Heo Kwang-hee	17; 21	19; 21
4	(Indonesia) (South Korea)	Mohammad Ahsan / Hendra Setiawan; Choi Sol-gyu / Kim Duk-young	21; 14	18; 21	21; 15
5	(Indonesia) (South Korea)	Firman Abdul Kholik; Ha Young-woong	20; 22	21; 15	21; 12

==== Thailand vs Canada ====
Thailand
5
IMPACT Arena Court 4
23 May 2018

Canada
0

			1	2	3
1	(Thailand) (Canada)	Khosit Phetpradab; Jason Ho-Shue	21; 15	21; 16
2	(Thailand) (Canada)	Nipitphon Phuangphuapet / Tanupat Viriyangkura; Jonathan Lai / Ty Alexander Lindeman	21; 13	21; 19
3	(Thailand) (Canada)	Suppanyu Avihingsanon; Brian Yang	21; 17	21; 17
4	(Thailand) (Canada)	Kittinupong Kedren / Dechapol Puavaranukroh; Jason Ho-Shue / Nyl Yakura	21; 17	21; 14
5	(Thailand) (Canada)	Pannawit Thongnuam; Antonio Li	21; 12	21; 14

== Group C ==
=== Teams ===
Draw position	Team	Confederation	Method of qualification	Date of qualification	Finals appearance	Last appearance	Previous best performance
C1 (seed)	Chinese Taipei	Badminton Asia	Best world team rankings	18 February 2018	3rd	2016	Quarter-final (2016)
C2	Japan	Badminton Asia	Best world team rankings	18 February 2018	18th	2016	Champions (2014)
C3	Germany	Badminton Europe	2018 European Team Championships semi-finalists	16 February 2018	8th	2016	Quarter-final (2010, 2012)
C4	Hong Kong	Badminton Asia	Best world team rankings	18 February 2018	5th	2016	Quarter-final (2016)

=== Standings ===
Pos	Team	Pld	W	L	GF	GA	GD	PF	PA	PD	Pts	Qualification
1	Japan	3	3	0	27	10	+17	730	621	+109	3	Advance to Quarter-finals
2	Chinese Taipei	3	2	1	20	13	+7	642	611	+31	2	Advance to Quarter-finals
3	Hong Kong	3	1	2	13	22	−9	629	655	−26	1	
4	Germany	3	0	3	11	26	−15	623	737	−114	0	

Source: BWF

=== Matches ===
==== Japan vs Hong Kong ====
Japan
4
IMPACT Arena Court 2
20 May 2018

Hong Kong
1

			1	2	3
1	(Japan) (Hong Kong)	Kento Momota; Ng Ka Long	15; 21	21; 16	21; 15
2	(Japan) (Hong Kong)	Takeshi Kamura / Keigo Sonoda; Lee Chun Hei / Or Chin Chung	21; 15	21; 13
3	(Japan) (Hong Kong)	Kenta Nishimoto; Wong Wing Ki	21; 18	21; 11
4	(Japan) (Hong Kong)	Takuto Inoue / Yuki Kaneko; Mak Hee Chun / Tang Chun Man	21; 12	21; 15
5	(Japan) (Hong Kong)	Kazumasa Sakai; Lee Cheuk Yiu	15; 21	13; 21

==== Chinese Taipei vs Germany ====
Chinese Taipei
5
IMPACT Arena Court 3
20 May 2018

Germany
0

			1	2	3
1	(Chinese Taipei) (Germany)	Chou Tien-chen; Kai Schäfer	23; 21	21; 15
2	(Chinese Taipei) (Germany)	Lee Jhe-huei / Lee Yang; Mark Lamsfuß / Marvin Emil Seidel	21; 16	21; 14
3	(Chinese Taipei) (Germany)	Wang Tzu-wei; Lars Schänzler	21; 16	21; 17
4	(Chinese Taipei) (Germany)	Chen Hung-ling / Wang Chi-lin; Jones Ralfy Jansen / Josche Zurwonne	21; 15	21; 18
5	(Chinese Taipei) (Germany)	Yang Chih-chieh; Marc Zwiebler	21; 17	21; 17

==== Japan vs Germany ====
Japan
4
IMPACT Arena Court 3
22 May 2018

Germany
1

			1	2	3
1	(Japan) (Germany)	Kento Momota; Alexander Roovers	21; 15	21; 13
2	(Japan) (Germany)	Takeshi Kamura / Keigo Sonoda; Mark Lamsfuß / Marvin Emil Seidel	15; 21	21; 13	19; 21
3	(Japan) (Germany)	Kenta Nishimoto; Kai Schäfer	21; 18	8; 21	21; 8
4	(Japan) (Germany)	Hiroyuki Endo / Yuta Watanabe; Jones Ralfy Jansen / Josche Zurwonne	16; 21	23; 21	21; 18
5	(Japan) (Germany)	Kanta Tsuneyama; Marc Zwiebler	19; 21	21; 10	21; 15

==== Chinese Taipei vs Hong Kong ====
Chinese Taipei
4
IMPACT Arena Court 1
22 May 2018

Hong Kong
1

			1	2	3
1	(Chinese Taipei) (Hong Kong)	Chou Tien-chen; Ng Ka Long	15; 21	23; 25
2	(Chinese Taipei) (Hong Kong)	Lee Jhe-huei / Lee Yang; Lee Chun Hei / Or Chin Chung	21; 14	21; 17
3	(Chinese Taipei) (Hong Kong)	Wang Tzu-wei; Lee Cheuk Yiu	21; 13	21; 15
4	(Chinese Taipei) (Hong Kong)	Lu Ching-yao / Yang Po-han; Mak Hee Chun / Tang Chun Man	21; 19	17; 21	21; 18
5	(Chinese Taipei) (Hong Kong)	Hsu Jen-hao; Hu Yun	21; 17	21; 14

==== Chinese Taipei vs Japan ====
Chinese Taipei
0
IMPACT Arena Court 1
23 May 2018

Japan
5

			1	2	3
1	(Chinese Taipei) (Japan)	Chou Tien-chen; Kento Momota	12; 21	21; 18	16; 21
2	(Chinese Taipei) (Japan)	Lee Jhe-huei / Lee Yang; Takeshi Kamura / Keigo Sonoda	25; 23	19; 21	16; 21
3	(Chinese Taipei) (Japan)	Wang Tzu-wei; Kenta Nishimoto	18; 21	17; 21
4	(Chinese Taipei) (Japan)	Wang Chi-lin / Yang Po-han; Hiroyuki Endo / Yuta Watanabe	19; 21	15; 21
5	(Chinese Taipei) (Japan)	Yang Chih-chieh; Kanta Tsuneyama	11; 21	18; 21

==== Hong Kong vs Germany ====
Hong Kong
3
IMPACT Arena Court 3
23 May 2018

Germany
2

			1	2	3
1	(Hong Kong) (Germany)	Ng Ka Long; Alexander Roovers	21; 15	21; 7
2	(Hong Kong) (Germany)	Lee Chun Hei / Or Chin Chung; Mark Lamsfuß / Marvin Emil Seidel	18; 21	21; 15	20; 22
3	(Hong Kong) (Germany)	Wong Wing Ki; Kai Schäfer	21; 13	20; 22	21; 15
4	(Hong Kong) (Germany)	Ho Wai Lun / Yeung Sing Choi; Jones Ralfy Jansen / Josche Zurwonne	18; 21	19; 21
5	(Hong Kong) (Germany)	Lee Cheuk Yiu; Marc Zwiebler	21; 13	15; 21	21; 15

== Group D ==
=== Teams ===
Draw position	Team	Confederation	Method of qualification	Date of qualification	Finals appearance	Last appearance	Previous best performance
D1 (seed)	Denmark	Badminton Europe	2016 Thomas & Uber Cup winners	22 May 2016	30th	2016	Champions (2016)
D2	Malaysia	Badminton Asia	2018 Asia Team Championships semi-finalist	9 February 2018	27th	2016	Champions (5 times)
D3	Russia	Badminton Europe	2018 European Team Championships best quarterfinalists	16 February 2018	3rd	2014	Group stage (2012, 2014)
D4	Algeria	BCA	2018 All Africa Team Championships winners	15 February 2018	1st	Debut	Debut

=== Standings ===
Pos	Team	Pld	W	L	GF	GA	GD	PF	PA	PD	Pts	Qualification
1	Denmark	3	3	0	26	7	+19	667	416	+251	3	Advance to Quarter-finals
2	Malaysia	3	2	1	27	6	+21	659	478	+181	2	Advance to Quarter-finals
3	Russia	3	1	2	10	20	−10	446	505	−59	1	
4	Algeria	3	0	3	0	30	−30	257	630	−373	0	

Source: BWF

=== Matches ===
==== Malaysia vs Russia ====
Malaysia
5
IMPACT Arena Court 2
21 May 2018

Russia
0

			1	2	3
1	(Malaysia) (Russia)	Lee Chong Wei; Vladimir Malkov	21; 9	21; 6
2	(Malaysia) (Russia)	Goh V Shem / Tan Wee Kiong; Vladimir Ivanov / Ivan Sozonov	21; 18	21; 19
3	(Malaysia) (Russia)	Lee Zii Jia; Sergey Sirant	21; 13	21; 16
4	(Malaysia) (Russia)	Aaron Chia / Teo Ee Yi; Evgenij Dremin / Denis Grachev	21; 6	21; 9
5	(Malaysia) (Russia)	Iskandar Zulkarnain Zainuddin; Rodion Alimov	21; 9	21; 12

==== Denmark vs Algeria ====
Denmark
5
IMPACT Arena Court 3
21 May 2018

Algeria
0

			1	2	3
1	(Denmark) (Algeria)	Viktor Axelsen; Youcef Sabri Medel	21; 4	21; 8
2	(Denmark) (Algeria)	Anders Antonsen; Mohamed Abderrahime Belarbi	21; 5	21; 9
3	(Denmark) (Algeria)	Jan Ø. Jørgensen; Adel Hamek	21; 7	21; 10
4	(Denmark) (Algeria)	Mathias Boe / Mathias Christiansen; Koceila Mammeri / Youcef Sabri Medel	21; 6	21; 11
5	(Denmark) (Algeria)	Mads Conrad-Petersen / Mads Pieler Kolding; Mohamed Abderrahime Belarbi / Adel Hamek	21; 3	21; 5

==== Denmark vs Russia ====
Denmark
5
IMPACT Arena Court 2
22 May 2018

Russia
0

			1	2	3
1	(Denmark) (Russia)	Viktor Axelsen; Vladimir Malkov	21; 14	21; 3
2	(Denmark) (Russia)	Mads Conrad-Petersen / Mads Pieler Kolding; Vladimit Ivanov / Ivan Sozonov	21; 17	21; 12
3	(Denmark) (Russia)	Hans-Kristian Vittinghus; Sergey Sirant	21; 17	21; 11
4	(Denmark) (Russia)	Kim Astrup / Anders Skaarup Rasmussen; Evgenij Dremin / Denis Grachev	21; 12	21; 12
5	(Denmark) (Russia)	Jan Ø. Jørgensen; Rodion Alimov	21; 6	21; 5

==== Malaysia vs Algeria ====
Malaysia
5
IMPACT Arena Court 3
22 May 2018

Algeria
0

			1	2	3
1	(Malaysia) (Algeria)	Lee Zii Jia; Youcef Sabri Medel	21; 6	21; 13
2	(Malaysia) (Algeria)	Iskandar Zulkarnain Zainuddin; Mohamed Abderrahime Belarbi	21; 7	21; 9
3	(Malaysia) (Algeria)	Leong Jun Hao; Adel Hamek	21; 13	21; 8
4	(Malaysia) (Algeria)	Mohamad Arif Abdul Latif / Teo Ee Yi; Koceila Mammeri / Youcef Sabri Medel	21; 12	21; 10
5	(Malaysia) (Algeria)	Aaron Chia / Soh Wooi Yik; Mohamed Abderrahime Belarbi / Adel Hamek	21; 11	21; 15

==== Denmark vs Malaysia ====
Denmark
3
IMPACT Arena Court 1
23 May 2018

Malaysia
2

			1	2	3
1	(Denmark) (Malaysia)	Viktor Axelsen; Lee Chong Wei	9; 21	19; 21
2	(Denmark) (Malaysia)	Mads Conrad-Petersen / Mads Pieler Kolding; Goh V Shem / Tan Wee Kiong	22; 24	21; 15	21; 15
3	(Denmark) (Malaysia)	Hans-Kristian Vittinghus; Lee Zii Jia	18; 21	18; 21
4	(Denmark) (Malaysia)	Mathias Boe / Mathias Christiansen; Aaron Chia / Teo Ee Yi	19; 21	21; 10	21; 18
5	(Denmark) (Malaysia)	Jan Ø. Jørgensen; Iskandar Zulkarnain Zainuddin	16; 21	21; 17	21; 14

==== Russia vs Algeria ====
Russia
5
IMPACT Arena Court 3
23 May 2018

Algeria
0

			1	2	3
1	(Russia) (Algeria)	Vladimir Malkov; Mohamed Abderrahime Belarbi	21; 8	21; 12
2	(Russia) (Algeria)	Sergey Sirant; Adel Hamek	21; 5	21; 8
3	(Russia) (Algeria)	Rodion Alimov / Ivan Sozonov; Majed Yacine Balahoune / Samy Khaldi	21; 6	21; 10
4	(Russia) (Algeria)	Vladimir Ivanov; Koceila Mammeri	21; 11	21; 11
5	(Russia) (Algeria)	Evgenij Dremin / Denis Grachev; Mohamed Abderrahime Belarbi / Adel Hamek	21; 4	21; 10
