= 2010 Uber Cup knockout stage =

Badminton competition

This article lists the complete results of the knockout stage of the 2010 Uber Cup in Kuala Lumpur, Malaysia.

== Qualified teams ==
The top two placed teams from each groups qualified for this stage.

Group	Winners	Runners-up
A	China	Malaysia
B	Indonesia	Denmark
C	Japan	Russia
D	South Korea	India

== Bracket ==
Quarter-finals
China	3
India	0
Indonesia	3
Malaysia	0
Russia	1
South Korea	3
Denmark	1
Japan	3

Semi-finals
China	3
Indonesia	0
South Korea	3
Japan	1

Final
China	1
South Korea	3

== Quarter-finals ==
=== China vs India ===
China
3
Putra Indoor Stadium, Court 2
12 May 2010, 18:00 UTC+8

India
0

			1	2	3
1	(China) (India)	Wang Yihan; Saina Nehwal	14; 21	21; 11	21; 18
2	(China) (India)	Ma Jin / Wang Xiaoli; Jwala Gutta / Ashwini Ponnappa	21; 8	21; 11
3	(China) (India)	Wang Xin; Sayali Gokhale	21; 10	21; 14
4	(China) (India)	Du Jing / Yu Yang; Aparna Balan / Shruti Kurien				not played
5	(China) (India)	Jiang Yanjiao; Trupti Murgunde				not played

=== Indonesia vs Malaysia ===
Indonesia
3
Putra Indoor Stadium, Court 1
12 May 2010, 12:00 UTC+8

Malaysia
0

			1	2	3
1	(Indonesia) (Malaysia)	Adriyanti Firdasari; Wong Mew Choo	21; 9	21; 16
2	(Indonesia) (Malaysia)	Meiliana Jauhari / Greysia Polii; Chin Eei Hui / Wong Pei Tty	26; 24	21; 18
3	(Indonesia) (Malaysia)	Maria Kristin Yulianti; Tee Jing Yi	21; 19	21; 16
4	(Indonesia) (Malaysia)	Shendy Puspa Irawati / Liliyana Natsir; Ng Hui Lin / Woon Khe Wei				not played
5	(Indonesia) (Malaysia)	Lindaweni Fanetri; Sonia Cheah Su Ya				not played

=== Russia vs South Korea ===
Russia
1
Putra Indoor Stadium, Court 4
12 May 2010, 18:00 UTC+8

South Korea
3

			1	2	3
1	(Russia) (South Korea)	Ella Diehl; Bae Seung-hee	9; 21	21; 19	14; 21
2	(Russia) (South Korea)	Valeria Sorokina / Nina Vislova; Kim Min-jung / Lee Hyo-jung	23; 21	9; 21	22; 24
3	(Russia) (South Korea)	Tatjana Bibik; Sung Ji-hyun	21; 12	8; 21	21; 14
4	(Russia) (South Korea)	Ksenia Polikarpova / Anastasia Russkikh; Ha Jung-eun / Jung Kyung-eun	16; 21	12; 21
5	(Russia) (South Korea)	Natalia Perminova; Bae Yeon-ju				not played

=== Denmark vs Japan ===
Denmark
1
Putra Indoor Stadium, Court 4
12 May 2010, 12:00 UTC+8

Japan
3

			1	2	3
1	(Denmark) (Japan)	Camilla Sørensen; Eriko Hirose	17; 21	11; 21
2	(Denmark) (Japan)	Christinna Pedersen / Kamilla Rytter Juhl; Miyuki Maeda / Satoko Suetsuna	21; 13	21; 15
3	(Denmark) (Japan)	Karina Jørgensen; Ai Goto	14; 21	10; 21
4	(Denmark) (Japan)	Lena Frier Kristiansen / Marie Røpke; Mizuki Fujii / Reika Kakiiwa	13; 21	21; 19	19; 21
5	(Denmark) (Japan)	Mette Poulsen; Sayaka Sato				not played

== Semi-finals ==
=== China vs Indonesia ===
China
3
Putra Indoor Stadium, Court 1
13 May 2010, 18:00 UTC+8

Indonesia
0

			1	2	3
1	(China) (Indonesia)	Wang Yihan; Maria Febe Kusumastuti	21; 7	21; 12
2	(China) (Indonesia)	Ma Jin / Wang Xiaoli; Meiliana Jauhari / Greysia Polii	21; 17	21; 13
3	(China) (Indonesia)	Wang Xin; Adriyanti Firdasari	21; 17	21; 15
4	(China) (Indonesia)	Du Jing / Yu Yang; Shendy Puspa Irawati / Liliyana Natsir				not played
5	(China) (Indonesia)	Jiang Yanjiao; Maria Kristin Yulianti				not played

=== South Korea vs Japan ===
South Korea
3
Putra Indoor Stadium, Court 1
13 May 2010, 12:00 UTC+8

Japan
1

			1	2	3
1	(South Korea) (Japan)	Bae Seung-hee; Eriko Hirose	21; 12	21; 16
2	(South Korea) (Japan)	Kim Min-jung / Lee Hyo-jung; Miyuki Maeda / Satoko Suetsuna	21; 19	21; 10
3	(South Korea) (Japan)	Bae Yeon-ju; Ai Goto	10; 21	20; 22
4	(South Korea) (Japan)	Ha Jung-eun / Lee Kyung-won; Mizuki Fujii / Reika Kakiiwa	21; 14	21; 18
5	(South Korea) (Japan)	Lee Yun-hwa; Sayaka Sato				not played

== Final ==
=== China vs South Korea ===
China
1
Putra Indoor Stadium, Court 1
15 May 2010, 14:00 UTC+8

South Korea
3

			1	2	3
1	(China) (South Korea)	Wang Yihan; Bae Seung-hee	21; 23	11; 21
2	(China) (South Korea)	Ma Jin / Wang Xiaoli; Kim Min-jung / Lee Hyo-jung	21; 18	12; 21	15; 21
3	(China) (South Korea)	Wang Xin; Sung Ji-hyun	21; 14	16; 21	21; 7
4	(China) (South Korea)	Du Jing / Yu Yang; Ha Jung-eun / Lee Kyung-won	21; 19	14; 21	19; 21
5	(China) (South Korea)	Jiang Yanjiao; Bae Yeon-ju				not played
