= 2010 Thomas & Uber Cup =

2010 Thomas & Uber Cup Piala Thomas & Uber 2010

Tournament details
- Dates: 9 – 16 May
- Edition: 26th (Thomas Cup); 23rd (Uber Cup)
- Level: International
- Venue: Putra Indoor Stadium
- Location: Kuala Lumpur, Malaysia

The 2010 Thomas & Uber Cup was the 26th tournament of the Thomas Cup and 23rd tournament of the Uber Cup, the most important and most prestigious badminton tournaments in men's and women's team competition, respectively. The 2010 championships marked the Thomas & Uber Cup's 10 year return to Malaysia which has always seen great fan interest in the sport.

The final rounds were held from May 9 to May 16 at Putra Indoor Stadium in Kuala Lumpur, Malaysia which was also the same venue of the 2000 Thomas & Uber Cup, when Indonesia get their 12th title in the Thomas Cup after defeat China by 3–0 in the final. But, Indonesia defeated by China, also by 0–3 in the final, to ensure China's eighth title in the Thomas Cup, while Korea won the Uber Cup after defeat China with 3–1 score.

== Host city selection ==
Badminton World Federation initially intended to split the Thomas and Uber Cup finals as separate tournaments. Malaysia was the only bidder for Thomas Cup finals, while China and South Korea were interested to host the Uber Cup finals. The plan to split the tournaments was eventually abandoned and Malaysia was asked to hold the Uber Cup final together.

== Venue ==
- Putra Indoor Stadium, Bukit Jalil, Kuala Lumpur

== Qualification ==
Confederation	Qualifier(s)	
Confederation	Thomas Cup	Uber Cup
Asia	Indonesia; South Korea; India; Japan	South Korea; Indonesia; India; Japan
Africa	Nigeria	South Africa
Europe	Denmark; Poland; Germany	Denmark; Russia; Germany
Oceania	Australia	Australia
Pan Am	Peru	United States
Defending Champions	China	China
Host nation	Malaysia	Malaysia

== Medal summary ==
=== Medalists ===
Event	Gold	Silver	Bronze
Thomas Cup	China; Lin Dan; Chen Jin; Bao Chunlai; Chen Long; Guo Zhendong; Xu Chen; Cai Yun; Fu Haifeng; Chai Biao; Zhang Nan	Indonesia; Taufik Hidayat; Sony Dwi Kuncoro; Simon Santoso; Dionysius Hayom Rumbaka; Markis Kido; Hendra Setiawan; Alvent Yulianto Chandra; Hendra Aprida Gunawan; Nova Widianto; Mohammad Ahsan	Malaysia; Lee Chong Wei; Wong Choong Hann; Muhammad Hafiz Hashim; Tan Chun Seang; Koo Kien Keat; Tan Boon Heong; Mohd Fairuzizuan Mohd Tazari; Mohd Zakry Abdul Latif; Hoon Thien How; Ong Soon Hock
Thomas Cup	China; Lin Dan; Chen Jin; Bao Chunlai; Chen Long; Guo Zhendong; Xu Chen; Cai Yun; Fu Haifeng; Chai Biao; Zhang Nan	Indonesia; Taufik Hidayat; Sony Dwi Kuncoro; Simon Santoso; Dionysius Hayom Rumbaka; Markis Kido; Hendra Setiawan; Alvent Yulianto Chandra; Hendra Aprida Gunawan; Nova Widianto; Mohammad Ahsan	Japan; Kenichi Tago; Kazushi Yamada; Sho Sasaki; Shoji Sato; Hiroyuki Endo; Kenta Kazuno; Kenichi Hayakawa; Hirokatsu Hashimoto; Noriyasu Hirata; Yoshiteru Hirobe
Uber Cup	South Korea; Bae Seung-hee; Sung Ji-hyun; Bae Yeon-ju; Lee Yun-hwa; Jung Kyung-eun; Ha Jung-eun; Kim Min-jung; Jang Ye-na; Lee Hyo-jung; Lee Kyung-won	China; Wang Yihan; Wang Xin; Wang Shixian; Jiang Yanjiao; Ma Jin; Wang Xiaoli; Du Jing; Yu Yang; Pan Pan; Tian Qing	Japan; Eriko Hirose; Ai Goto; Sayaka Sato; Yu Hirayama; Mizuki Fujii; Reika Kakiiwa; Mami Naito; Shizuka Matsuo; Miyuki Maeda; Satoko Suetsuna
Uber Cup	South Korea; Bae Seung-hee; Sung Ji-hyun; Bae Yeon-ju; Lee Yun-hwa; Jung Kyung-eun; Ha Jung-eun; Kim Min-jung; Jang Ye-na; Lee Hyo-jung; Lee Kyung-won	China; Wang Yihan; Wang Xin; Wang Shixian; Jiang Yanjiao; Ma Jin; Wang Xiaoli; Du Jing; Yu Yang; Pan Pan; Tian Qing	Indonesia; Maria Febe Kusumastuti; Adriyanti Firdasari; Maria Kristin Yulianti; Lindaweni Fanetri; Greysia Polii; Nitya Krishinda Maheswari; Shendy Puspa Irawati; Meiliana Jauhari; Lilyana Natsir; Anneke Feinya Agustin

=== Medal table ===
* Host nation (Malaysia)

Rank	Nation	Gold	Silver	Bronze	Total
1	China	1	1	0	2
2	South Korea	1	0	0	1
3	Indonesia	0	1	1	2
4	Japan	0	0	2	2
5	Malaysia*	0	0	1	1
Totals (5 entries)		2	2	4	8

== Thomas Cup ==
=== Group stage ===
==== Group A ====
Pos	Team	Pld	W	L	GF	GA	GD	PF	PA	PD	Pts	Qualification
1	China	2	2	0	19	2	+17	441	263	+178	2	Advance to quarter-finals
2	South Korea	2	1	1	12	9	+3	395	343	+52	1	Advance to quarter-finals
3	Peru	2	0	2	0	20	−20	190	420	−230	0	

Source: BadmintonCN

9 May 2010
12:00 UTC+8

China	5–0	Peru
Report

Putra Indoor Stadium Court 3, Kuala Lumpur

10 May 2010
12:00 UTC+8

South Korea	5–0	Peru
Report

Putra Indoor Stadium Court 3, Kuala Lumpur

11 May 2010
12:00 UTC+8

China	4–1	South Korea
Report

Putra Indoor Stadium Court 2, Kuala Lumpur

==== Group B ====
Pos	Team	Pld	W	L	GF	GA	GD	PF	PA	PD	Pts	Qualification
1	Japan	2	2	0	16	5	+11	405	292	+113	2	Advance to quarter-finals
2	Malaysia (H)	2	1	1	15	6	+9	405	195	+210	1	Advance to quarter-finals
3	Nigeria	2	0	2	0	20	−20	97	420	−323	0	

Source: BadmintonCN
(H) Host

9 May 2010
18:00 UTC+8

Malaysia	5–0	Nigeria
Report

Putra Indoor Stadium Court 3, Kuala Lumpur

10 May 2010
18:00 UTC+8

Japan	5–0	Nigeria
Report

Putra Indoor Stadium Court 3, Kuala Lumpur

11 May 2010
18:00 UTC+8

Malaysia	2–3	Japan
Report

Putra Indoor Stadium Court 1, Kuala Lumpur

==== Group C ====
Pos	Team	Pld	W	L	GF	GA	GD	PF	PA	PD	Pts	Qualification
1	Denmark	2	2	0	18	2	+16	414	252	+162	2	Advance to quarter-finals
2	Germany	2	1	1	12	10	+2	374	417	−43	1	Advance to quarter-finals
3	Poland	2	0	2	2	20	−18	340	459	−119	0	

Source: BadmintonCN

9 May 2010
18:00 UTC+8

Denmark	5–0	Poland
Report

Putra Indoor Stadium Court 1, Kuala Lumpur

10 May 2010
18:00 UTC+8

Germany	5–0	Poland
Report

Putra Indoor Stadium Court 1, Kuala Lumpur

11 May 2010
18:00 UTC+8

Denmark	4–1	Germany
Report

Putra Indoor Stadium Court 3, Kuala Lumpur

==== Group D ====
Pos	Team	Pld	W	L	GF	GA	GD	PF	PA	PD	Pts	Qualification
1	Indonesia	2	2	0	19	3	+16	439	310	+129	2	Advance to quarter-finals
2	India	2	1	1	11	11	0	398	362	+36	1	Advance to quarter-finals
3	Australia	2	0	2	2	18	−16	254	419	−165	0	

Source: BadmintonCN

9 May 2010
12:00 UTC+8

Indonesia	5–0	Australia
Report

Putra Indoor Stadium Court 2, Kuala Lumpur

10 May 2010
12:00 UTC+8

Indonesia	4–1	India
Report

Putra Indoor Stadium Court 2, Kuala Lumpur

11 May 2010
12:00 UTC+8

India	4–1	Australia
Report

Putra Indoor Stadium Court 3, Kuala Lumpur

=== Knockout stage ===
==== Bracket ====
Quarter-finals
China	3
South Korea	0
Denmark	2
Malaysia	3
Germany	1
Japan	3
India	0
Indonesia	3

Semi-finals
China	3
Malaysia	0
Japan	1
Indonesia	3

Final
China	3
Indonesia	0

==== Quarter-finals ====
12 May 2010
12:00 UTC+8

China	3–0	South Korea
Report

Putra Indoor Stadium Court 2, Kuala Lumpur

12 May 2010
18:00 UTC+8

Denmark	2–3	Malaysia
Report

Putra Indoor Stadium Court 1, Kuala Lumpur

12 May 2010
18:00 UTC+8

Germany	1–3	Japan
Report

Putra Indoor Stadium Court 3, Kuala Lumpur

12 May 2010
12:00 UTC+8

India	0–3	Indonesia
Report

Putra Indoor Stadium Court 3, Kuala Lumpur

==== Semi-finals ====
14 May 2010
19:00 UTC+8

China	3–0	Malaysia
Report

Putra Indoor Stadium Court 1, Kuala Lumpur

14 May 2010
14:30 UTC+8

Japan	1–3	Indonesia
Report

Putra Indoor Stadium Court 1, Kuala Lumpur

==== Final ====
16 May 2010
14:00 UTC+8

China	3–0	Indonesia
Report

Putra Indoor Stadium Court 1, Kuala Lumpur

2010 Thomas Cup champion

China
Eighth title

== Uber Cup ==
=== Group stage ===
==== Group W ====
Pos	Team	Pld	W	L	GF	GA	GD	PF	PA	PD	Pts	Qualification
1	China	2	2	0	20	0	+20	420	167	+253	2	Advance to quarter-finals
2	Malaysia (H)	2	1	1	10	12	−2	348	371	−23	1	Advance to quarter-finals
3	United States	2	0	2	2	20	−18	228	458	−230	0	

Source: BadmintonCN
(H) Host

9 May 2010
18:00 UTC+8

China	5–0	United States
Report

Putra Indoor Stadium Court 2, Kuala Lumpur

10 May 2010
18:00 UTC+8

Malaysia	5–0	United States
Report

Putra Indoor Stadium Court 2, Kuala Lumpur

11 May 2010
18:00 UTC+8

China	5–0	Malaysia
Report

Putra Indoor Stadium Court 2, Kuala Lumpur

==== Group X ====
Pos	Team	Pld	W	L	GF	GA	GD	PF	PA	PD	Pts	Qualification
1	Indonesia	2	2	0	20	1	+19	433	243	+190	2	Advance to quarter-finals
2	Denmark	2	1	1	7	14	−7	313	389	−76	1	Advance to quarter-finals
3	Australia	2	0	2	4	16	−12	271	385	−114	0	

Source: BadmintonCN

9 May 2010
12:00 UTC+8

Indonesia	5–0	Australia
Report

Putra Indoor Stadium Court 1, Kuala Lumpur

10 May 2010
12:00 UTC+8

Denmark	3–2	Australia
Report

Putra Indoor Stadium Court 1, Kuala Lumpur

11 May 2010
12:00 UTC+8

Indonesia	5–0	Denmark
Report

Putra Indoor Stadium Court 1, Kuala Lumpur

==== Group Y ====
Pos	Team	Pld	W	L	GF	GA	GD	PF	PA	PD	Pts	Qualification
1	Japan	2	2	0	18	4	+14	440	325	+115	2	Advance to quarter-finals
2	Russia	2	1	1	9	13	−4	371	416	−45	1	Advance to quarter-finals
3	Germany	2	0	2	6	16	−10	358	428	−70	0	

Source: BadmintonCN

9 May 2010
12:00 UTC+8

Japan	4–1	Germany
Report

Putra Indoor Stadium Court 4, Kuala Lumpur

10 May 2010
12:00 UTC+8

Russia	4–1	Germany
Report

Putra Indoor Stadium Court 4, Kuala Lumpur

11 May 2010
12:00 UTC+8

Japan	5–0	Russia
Report

Putra Indoor Stadium Court 4, Kuala Lumpur

==== Group Z ====
Pos	Team	Pld	W	L	GF	GA	GD	PF	PA	PD	Pts	Qualification
1	South Korea	2	2	0	19	4	+15	475	276	+199	2	Advance to quarter-finals
2	India	2	1	1	14	9	+5	411	354	+57	1	Advance to quarter-finals
3	South Africa	2	0	2	0	20	−20	164	420	−256	0	

Source: BadmintonCN

9 May 2010
18:00 UTC+8

South Korea	5–0	South Africa
Report

Putra Indoor Stadium Court 4, Kuala Lumpur

10 May 2010
18:00 UTC+8

India	5–0	South Africa
Report

Putra Indoor Stadium Court 4, Kuala Lumpur

11 May 2010
18:00 UTC+8

South Korea	4–1	India
Report

Putra Indoor Stadium Court 4, Kuala Lumpur

=== Knockout stage ===
==== Bracket ====
Quarter-finals
China	3
India	0
Indonesia	3
Malaysia	0
Russia	1
South Korea	3
Denmark	1
Japan	3

Semi-finals
China	3
Indonesia	0
South Korea	3
Japan	1

Final
China	1
South Korea	3

==== Quarter-finals ====
12 May 2010
18:00 UTC+8

China	3–0	India
Report

Putra Indoor Stadium Court 2, Kuala Lumpur

12 May 2010
12:00 UTC+8

Indonesia	3–0	Malaysia
Report

Putra Indoor Stadium Court 1, Kuala Lumpur

12 May 2010
18:00 UTC+8

Russia	1–3	South Korea
Report

Putra Indoor Stadium Court 4, Kuala Lumpur

12 May 2010
12:00 UTC+8

Denmark	1–3	Japan
Report

Putra Indoor Stadium Court 4, Kuala Lumpur

==== Semi-finals ====
13 May 2010
18:00 UTC+8

China	3–0	Indonesia
Report

Putra Indoor Stadium Court 1, Kuala Lumpur

13 May 2010
12:00 UTC+8

South Korea	3–1	Japan
Report

Putra Indoor Stadium Court 1, Kuala Lumpur

==== Final ====
15 May 2010
14:00 UTC+8

China	1–3	South Korea
Report

Putra Indoor Stadium Court 1, Kuala Lumpur

2010 Uber Cup champion

South Korea
First title
