= 2024 BWF World Junior Championships – Teams event group stage =

First stage of the competition

The group stage of the 2024 BWF World Junior Championships – Teams event is the first stage of the competition. It will hold at Nanchang International Sports Center in Nanchang, Jiangxi, China, from 30 September – 5 October 2024.

== Group composition ==
The draw for 40 teams competing in the tournament were announced on 22 August 2024.

Group A	Group B	Group C	Group D
1. China [1]; 2. South Korea [9/16]; 3. Australia; 4. Hong Kong; 5. ~~Ghana~~ (withdrew)	1. France [5/8]; 2. Chinese Taipei [9/16]; 3. Singapore; 4. Slovakia; 5. Armenia	1. Malaysia [3/4]; 2. Netherlands [9/16]; 3. Estonia; 4. Norway; 5. Mongolia	1. United Arab Emirates [5/8]; 2. Denmark [9/16]; 3. New Zealand; 4. Trinidad and Tobago; 5. Cook Islands
Group E	Group F	Group G	Group H
1. India [5/8]; 2. Turkey [9/16]; 3. Mauritius; 4. Peru; 5. Azerbaijan	1. Indonesia [3/4]; 2. Poland [9/16]; 3. Sri Lanka; 4. Northern Mariana Islands; 5. Macau	1. Japan [5/8]; 2. Slovenia [9/16]; 3. England; 4. Uganda; 5. Latvia	1. Thailand [2]; 2. United States [9/16]; 3. Portugal; 4. Vietnam; 5. Philippines

== Group A ==
Pos	Team	Pld	W	L	MF	MA	MD	GF	GA	GD	PF	PA	PD	Pts	Qualification
1	China [1] (H)	4	4	0	330	174	+156	30	0	+30	1815	970	+845	4	Qualified to knockout stage 1st to 8th
2	South Korea [9/16]	4	3	1	289	269	+20	18	12	+6	1565	1490	+75	3	Qualified to knockout stage 9th to 16th place
3	Hong Kong [17/40]	4	2	2	265	291	−26	12	18	−6	1490	1604	−114	2	Qualified to knockout stage 17th to 24th place
4	Australia [17/40]	4	1	3	180	330	−150	0	30	−30	1009	1815	−806	1	Qualified to knockout stage 25th to 32nd place
5	Ghana [17/40]	4	0	4	0	0	0	0	0	0	0	0	0	0	Withdrawn

Source: TS
(H) Host

=== China vs Ghana ===
(0) China vs Ghana (0); Monday, 30 September 2024, 09:00 UTC+8; Nanchang International Sports Center, Court 1
#	Category	China	Score (Partition score)	Ghana
1	MS		walkover	
2	MS		walkover	
3	WS		walkover	
4	WS		walkover	
5	MD		walkover	
6	MD		walkover	
7	WD		walkover	
8	WD		walkover	
9	XD		walkover	
10	XD		walkover	
Result

=== South Korea vs Hong Kong ===
(110) South Korea vs Hong Kong (96); Monday, 30 September 2024, 09:00 UTC+8; Nanchang International Sports Center, Court 7
#	Category	South Korea	Score (Partition score)	Hong Kong
1	WS	Kim Do-yeon (South Korea)	8–11 (8–11)	(Hong Kong) Wong Yi
2	MS	Yang Byeong-geon (South Korea)	19–22 (11–11)	(Hong Kong) Lam Ka To
3	XD	Yang Byeong-geon (South Korea); Kim Tae-yeon (South Korea)	33–30 (14–8)	(Hong Kong) Awan Usman (Hong Kong) Liu Hoi Kiu
4	WD	Kim So-hee (South Korea); Kim Tae-yeon (South Korea)	44–38 (11–8)	(Hong Kong) Chu Wing Chi (Hong Kong) Liu Hoi Kiu
5	MD	Lee Hyeong-woo (South Korea); Park Geon-hu (South Korea)	55–49 (11–11)	(Hong Kong) Cheung Sai Shing (Hong Kong) Deng Chi Fai
6	WS	Kim Do-yeon (South Korea)	66–58 (11–9)	(Hong Kong) Wong Yi
7	MS	Park Geon-hu (South Korea)	77–70 (11–12)	(Hong Kong) Lam Ka To
8	XD	Lee Hyeong-woo (South Korea); Kim So-hee (South Korea)	88–78 (11–8)	(Hong Kong) Awan Usman (Hong Kong) Liu Hoi Kiu
9	WD	Kim So-hee (South Korea); Kim Tae-yeon (South Korea)	99–84 (11–6)	(Hong Kong) Chu Wing Chi (Hong Kong) Liu Hoi Kiu
10	MD	Lee Hyeong-woo (South Korea); Park Geon-hu (South Korea)	110–96 (11–12)	(Hong Kong) Cheung Sai Shing (Hong Kong) Deng Chi Fai
Result

=== Australia vs Ghana ===
(0) Australia vs Ghana (0); Monday, 30 September 2024, 15:00 UTC+8; Nanchang International Sports Center, Court 3
#	Category	Australia	Score (Partition score)	Ghana
1	MS		walkover	
2	MS		walkover	
3	WS		walkover	
4	WS		walkover	
5	MD		walkover	
6	MD		walkover	
7	WD		walkover	
8	WD		walkover	
9	XD		walkover	
10	XD		walkover	
Result

=== China vs Hong Kong ===
(110) China vs Hong Kong (59); Monday, 30 September 2024, 15:00 UTC+8; Nanchang International Sports Center, Court 4
#	Category	China	Score (Partition score)	Hong Kong
1	WS	Xu Wenjing (China)	11–6 (11–6)	(Hong Kong) Wong Yi
2	MS	Hu Zhean (China)	22–18 (11–12)	(Hong Kong) Lam Ka To
3	XD	Lin Xiangyi (China); Liu Yuanyuan (China)	33–24 (11–6)	(Hong Kong) Cyrus Chung (Hong Kong) Liu Hoi Kiu
4	MD	Hu Keyuan (China); Lin Xiangyi (China)	44–27 (11–3)	(Hong Kong) Cheung Sai Shing (Hong Kong) Deng Chi Fai
5	WD	Chen Fanshutian (China); Liu Jiayue (China)	55–31 (11–4)	(Hong Kong) Chu Wing Chi (Hong Kong) Liu Hoi Kiu
6	WS	Xu Wenjing (China)	66–37 (11–6)	(Hong Kong) Wong Yi
7	MS	Hu Zhean (China)	77–43 (11–6)	(Hong Kong) Lam Ka To
8	XD	Lin Xiangyi (China); Liu Yuanyuan (China)	88–50 (11–7)	(Hong Kong) Lam Ka To (Hong Kong) Lee Hoi Lam
9	MD	Hu Keyuan (China); Lin Xiangyi (China)	99–54 (11–4)	(Hong Kong) Cheung Sai Shing (Hong Kong) Deng Chi Fai
10	WD	Chen Fanshutian (China); Liu Jiayue (China)	110–59 (11–5)	(Hong Kong) Chan Wing Lam (Hong Kong) Lee Hoi Lam
Result

=== China vs Australia ===
(110) China vs Australia (46); Tuesday, 1 October 2024, 09:30 UTC+8; Nanchang International Sports Center, Court 4
#	Category	China	Score (Partition score)	Australia
1	WD	Chen Fanshutian (China); Liu Yuanyuan (China)	11–4 (11–4)	(Australia) Sydney Tjonadi (Australia) Victoria Tjonadi
2	XD	Li Hongyi (China); Zhang Jiahan (China)	22–9 (11–4)	(Australia) Jayden Lim (Australia) Victoria Tjonadi
3	MD	Hu Keyuan (China); Lin Xiangyi (China)	33–11 (11–1)	(Australia) Shrey Dhand (Australia) Jayden Lim
4	MS	Hu Zhean (China)	44–20 (11–5)	(Australia) Shrey Dhand
5	WS	Yin Yiqing (China)	55–23 (11–3)	(Australia) Isabella Yan
6	WD	Jiang Peixi (China); Wang Dao (China)	66–28 (11–3)	(Australia) Sydney Tjonadi (Australia) Victoria Tjonadi
7	XD	Hu Keyuan (China); Liu Jiayue (China)	77–35 (11–5)	(Australia) Landon Kurniawan (Australia) Sydney Tjonadi
8	MD	Chen Junting (China); Liu Junrong (China)	88–38 (11–3)	(Australia) Landon Kurniawan (Australia) Jayden Lim
9	MS	Wang Zijun (China)	99–46 (11–6)	(Australia) Shrey Dhand
10	WS	Yuan Anqi (China)	110–46 (2–0^{ret})	(Australia) Isabella Yan
Result

=== South Korea vs Ghana ===
(0) South Korea vs Ghana (0); Tuesday, 1 October 2024, 09:30 UTC+8; Nanchang International Sports Center, Court 5
#	Category	South Korea	Score (Partition score)	Ghana
1	MS		walkover	
2	MS		walkover	
3	WS		walkover	
4	WS		walkover	
5	MD		walkover	
6	MD		walkover	
7	WD		walkover	
8	WD		walkover	
9	XD		walkover	
10	XD		walkover	
Result

=== Hong Kong vs Ghana ===
(0) Hong Kong vs Ghana (0); Tuesday, 1 October 2024, 15:30 UTC+8; Nanchang International Sports Center, Court 7
#	Category	Hong Kong	Score (Partition score)	Ghana
1	MS		walkover	
2	MS		walkover	
3	WS		walkover	
4	WS		walkover	
5	MD		walkover	
6	MD		walkover	
7	WD		walkover	
8	WD		walkover	
9	XD		walkover	
10	XD		walkover	
Result

=== South Korea vs Australia ===
(110) South Korea vs Australia (63); Tuesday, 1 October 2024, 15:30 UTC+8; Nanchang International Sports Center, Court 8
#	Category	South Korea	Score (Partition score)	Australia
1	MS	Jung Yi-soo (South Korea)	11–9 (11–9)	(Australia) Emmanuel Stephen Sam
2	XD	Lee Hyeong-woo (South Korea); Kim Han-bi (South Korea)	22–14 (11–5)	(Australia) Landon Kurniawan (Australia) Jazmine Lam
3	MD	Cho Eun-sang (South Korea); Jung Yi-soo (South Korea)	33–20 (11–6)	(Australia) Landon Kurniawan (Australia) Jayden Lim
4	WD	Kim Han-bi (South Korea); Kim Tae-yeon (South Korea)	44–26 (11–6)	(Australia) Jazmine Lam (Australia) Bethany Li
5	WS	Kwak Seung-min (South Korea)	55–30 (11–4)	(Australia) Sydney Tjonadi
6	MS	Seo Jun-seo (South Korea)	66–38 (11–8)	(Australia) Emmanuel Stephen Sam
7	XD	Seo Jun-seo (South Korea); Kwak Seung-min (South Korea)	77–41 (11–3)	(Australia) Jayden Lim (Australia) Bethany Li
8	MD	Cho Eun-sang (South Korea); Jung Yi-soo (South Korea)	88–52 (11–11)	(Australia) Landon Kurniawan (Australia) Emmanuel Stephen Sam
9	WD	Kim Do-yeon (South Korea); Lee Da-hyun (South Korea)	99–56 (11–4)	(Australia) Jazmine Lam (Australia) Bethany Li
10	WS	Lee Da-hyun (South Korea)	110–63 (11–7)	(Australia) Sydney Tjonadi
Result

=== Hong Kong vs Australia ===
(110) Hong Kong vs Australia (71); Wednesday, 2 October 2024, 12:30 UTC+8; Nanchang International Sports Center, Court 2
#	Category	Hong Kong	Score (Partition score)	Australia
1	WD	Chan Wing Lam (Hong Kong); Ip Sum Yau (Hong Kong)	11–9 (11–9)	(Australia) Jazmine Lam (Australia) Bethany Li
2	WS	Wong Yi (Hong Kong)	22–18 (11–9)	(Australia) Victoria Tjonadi
3	MS	Awan Usuman (Hong Kong)	33–25 (11–7)	(Australia) Emmanuel Stephen Sam
4	XD	Lam Ka To (Hong Kong); Ip Sum Yau (Hong Kong)	44–32 (11–7)	(Australia) Jayden Lim (Australia) Victoria Tjonadi
5	MD	Cheung Sai Shing (Hong Kong); Deng Chi Fai (Hong Kong)	55–36 (11–4)	(Australia) Landon Kurniawan (Australia) Jayden Lim
6	WD	Chu Wing Chi (Hong Kong); Liu Hoi Kiu Anna (Hong Kong)	66–42 (11–6)	(Australia) Sydney Tjonadi (Australia) Victoria Tjonadi
7	WS	Lee Hoi Lam Joan (Hong Kong)	77–47 (11–5)	(Australia) Victoria Tjonadi
8	MS	Lam Ka To (Hong Kong)	88–57 (11–10)	(Australia) Shrey Dhand
9	XD	Cheung Sai Shing (Hong Kong); Liu Hoi Kiu Anna (Hong Kong)	99–63 (11–5)	(Australia) Landon Kurniawan (Australia) Sydney Tjonadi
10	MD	Cheng Ying Kit (Hong Kong); Chung Ching Cyrus (Hong Kong)	110–71 (11–8)	(Australia) Landon Kurniawan (Australia) Jayden Lim
Result

=== China vs South Korea ===
(110) China vs South Korea (69); Wednesday, 2 October 2024, 12:30 UTC+8; Nanchang International Sports Center, Court 1
#	Category	China	Score (Partition score)	South Korea
1	MD	Hu Keyuan (China); Lin Xiangyi (China)	11–2 (11–2)	(South Korea) Lee Hyeong-woo (South Korea) Park Geon-hu
2	WS	Xu Wenjing (China)	22–10 (11–5)	(South Korea) Kim Do-yeon
3	XD	Lin Xiangyi (China); Liu Yuanyuan (China)	33–20 (11–10)	(South Korea) Lee Hyeong-woo (South Korea) Kim So-hee
4	MS	Hu Zhean (China)	44–23 (11–3)	(South Korea) Yang Byeong-geon
5	WD	Chen Fanshutian (China); Liu Jia Yue (China)	55–29 (11–6)	(South Korea) Kim So-hee (South Korea) Kim Tae-yeon
6	MD	Hu Keyuan (China); Lin Xiangyi (China)	66–37 (11–8)	(South Korea) Lee Hyeong-woo (South Korea) Park Geon-hu
7	WS	Xu Wenjing (China)	77–48 (11–11)	(South Korea) Kim Do-yeon
8	XD	Lin Xiangyi (China); Liu Yuanyuan (China)	88–59 (11–11)	(South Korea) Lee Hyeong-woo (South Korea) Kim So-hee
9	MS	Hu Zhean (China)	99–64 (11–5)	(South Korea) Yang Byeong-geon
10	WD	Chen Fanshutian (China); Liu Jia Yue (China)	110–69 (11–5)	(South Korea) Kim So-hee (South Korea) Kim Tae-yeon
Result

== Group B ==
Pos	Team	Pld	W	L	MF	MA	MD	GF	GA	GD	PF	PA	PD	Pts	Qualification
1	Chinese Taipei [9/16]	4	4	0	440	267	+173	35	5	+30	2390	1412	+978	4	Qualified to knockout stage 1st to 8th
2	France [5/8]	4	3	1	435	279	+156	34	6	+28	2399	1532	+867	3	Qualified to knockout stage 9th to 16th place
3	Singapore [17/40]	4	2	2	352	345	+7	21	19	+2	1944	1871	+73	2	Qualified to knockout stage 17th to 24th place
4	Slovakia [17/40]	4	1	3	293	385	−92	10	30	−20	1569	2129	−560	1	Qualified to knockout stage 25th to 32nd place
5	Armenia [17/40]	4	0	4	196	440	−244	0	40	−40	1062	2420	−1358	0	Qualified to knockout stage 33rd to 40th place

Source: TS

=== France vs Armenia ===
(110) France vs Armenia (47); Monday, 30 September 2024, 09:00 UTC+8; Nanchang International Sports Center, Court 3
#	Category	France	Score (Partition score)	Armenia
1	XD	Tom Lalot Trescarte (France); Elsa Jacob (France)	11–3 (11–3)	(Armenia) Narek Pogosyan (Armenia) Lusine Smbatyan
2	MS	Arthur Tatranov (France)	22–5 (11–0)	(Armenia) Hamlet Parsyan
3	WS	Malya Hoareau (France)	33–14 (11–4)	(Armenia) Lusine Smbatyan
4	WD	Agathe Cuevas (France); Kathell Desmots-Chacun (France)	44–18 (11–3)	(Armenia) Eliza Hovhannisyan (Armenia) Lusine Smbatyan
5	MD	Thibault Gardon (France); Ewan Goulin (France)	55–23 (11–3)	(Armenia) Edgar Hovhannisyan (Armenia) Narek Pogosyan
6	XD	Tom Lalot Trescarte (France); Elsa Jacob (France)	66–33 (11–8)	(Armenia) Hamlet Parsyan (Armenia) Eliza Hovhannisyan
7	MS	Arthur Tatranov (France)	77–33 (11–0)	(Armenia) Edgar Hovhannisyan
8	WS	Malya Hoareau (France)	88–36 (11–1)	(Armenia) Eliza Hovhannisyan
9	WD	Elsa Jacob (France); Camille Pognante (France)	99–44 (11–4)	(Armenia) Eliza Hovhannisyan (Armenia) Lusine Smbatyan
10	MD	Thibault Gardon (France); Ewan Goulin (France)	110–47 (11–2)	(Armenia) Hamlet Parsyan (Armenia) Narek Pogosyan
Result

=== Chinese Taipei vs Slovakia ===
(110) Chinese Taipei vs Slovakia (56); Monday, 30 September 2024, 09:00 UTC+8; Nanchang International Sports Center, Court 4
#	Category	Chinese Taipei	Score (Partition score)	Slovakia
1	WD	Chen Yan-fei (Chinese Taipei); Sun Liang-ching (Chinese Taipei)	11–6 (11–6)	(Slovakia) Karin Goldiánová (Slovakia) Johanka Ivanovičová
2	MS	Wu Zhe-ying (Chinese Taipei)	22–8 (11–2)	(Slovakia) Alex Petrovič
3	MD	Lai Po-yu (Chinese Taipei); Lin Yi-hao (Chinese Taipei)	33–16 (11–6)	(Slovakia) Matúš Poláček (Slovakia) Andrej Suchý
4	WS	Wang Pei-yu (Chinese Taipei)	44–17 (11–1)	(Slovakia) Lea Kyselicová
5	XD	Bao Xin Da Gu La Wai (Chinese Taipei); Hsieh Mi-yen (Chinese Taipei)	55–20 (11–0)	(Slovakia) Matúš Poláček (Slovakia) Karin Goldiánová
6	WD	Chou Yun-an (Chinese Taipei); Huang Ke-xin (Chinese Taipei)	66–30 (11–5)	(Slovakia) Karin Goldiánová (Slovakia) Johanka Ivanovičová
7	MS	Su Wei-cheng (Chinese Taipei)	77–34 (11–4)	(Slovakia) Alex Petrovič
8	MD	Chiu Chi-ruei (Chinese Taipei); Chiu Shao-hua (Chinese Taipei)	88–39 (11–4)	(Slovakia) Matúš Poláček (Slovakia) Andrej Suchý
9	WS	Lee Pin-yi (Chinese Taipei)	99–48 (11–8)	(Slovakia) Lea Kyselicová
10	XD	Tsai Cheng-ying (Chinese Taipei); Jheng Yu-chieh (Chinese Taipei)	110–56 (11–8)	(Slovakia) Andrej Suchý (Slovakia) Johanka Ivanovičová
Result

=== Singapore vs Armenia ===
(110) Singapore vs Armenia (47); Monday, 30 September 2024, 15:00 UTC+8; Nanchang International Sports Center, Court 5
#	Category	Singapore	Score (Partition score)	Armenia
1	MD	Nicholas Kat (Singapore); Nge Joo Jin (Singapore)	11–1 (11–1)	(Armenia) Hamlet Parsyan (Armenia) Narek Pogosyan
2	WS	Chia Xin Ying (Singapore)	22–12 (11–7)	(Armenia) Lusine Smbatyan
3	MS	Justin Tay (Singapore)	33–15 (11–3)	(Armenia) Hamlet Parsyan
4	WD	Heng Xiao En (Singapore); Michelle Zan (Singapore)	44–17 (11–2)	(Armenia) Eliza Hovhannisyan (Armenia) Lusine Smbatyan
5	XD	Nicholas Kat (Singapore); Li Zheng Yan (Singapore)	55–21 (11–1)	(Armenia) Edgar Hovhannisyan (Armenia) Lusine Smbatyan
6	MD	Marco Boon (Singapore); Ng Ming Zhe (Singapore)	66–30 (11–5)	(Armenia) Hamlet Parsyan (Armenia) Narek Pogosyan
7	WS	Aaliyah Zakaria (Singapore)	77–33 (11–3)	(Armenia) Eliza Hovhannisyan
8	MS	Ding Han Jin (Singapore)	88–37 (11–2)	(Armenia) Edgar Hovhannisyan
9	WD	Li Zheng Yan (Singapore); Michelle Zan (Singapore)	99–42 (11–2)	(Armenia) Eliza Hovhannisyan (Armenia) Lusine Smbatyan
10	XD	Nge Joo Jin (Singapore); Heng Xiao En (Singapore)	110–47 (11–2)	(Armenia) Narek Pogosyan (Armenia) Eliza Hovhannisyan
Result

=== France vs Slovakia ===
(110) France vs Slovakia (49); Monday, 30 September 2024, 15:00 UTC+8; Nanchang International Sports Center, Court 7
#	Category	France	Score (Partition score)	Slovakia
1	MS	Arthur Tatranov (France)	11–3 (11–3)	(Slovakia) Alex Petrovič
2	MD	Thibault Gardon (France); Ewan Goulin (France)	22–12 (11–7)	(Slovakia) Matúš Poláček (Slovakia) Andrej Suchý
3	WS	Malya Hoareau (France)	33–14 (11–2)	(Slovakia) Lea Kyselicová
4	WD	Agathe Cuevas (France); Kathell Desmots-Chacun (France)	44–22 (11–7)	(Slovakia) Karin Goldiánová (Slovakia) Lea Kyselicová
5	XD	Tom Lalot Trescarte (France); Elsa Jacob (France)	55–28 (11–6)	(Slovakia) Andrej Suchý (Slovakia) Johanka Ivanovičová
6	MS	Arthur Tatranov (France)	66–32 (11–4)	(Slovakia) Matúš Poláček
7	MD	Thibault Gardon (France); Ewan Goulin (France)	77–36 (11–4)	(Slovakia) Matúš Poláček (Slovakia) Andrej Suchý
8	WS	Malya Hoareau (France)	88–42 (11–6)	(Slovakia) Johanka Ivanovičová
9	WD	Elsa Jacob (France); Camille Pognante (France)	99–45 (11–3)	(Slovakia) Karin Goldiánová (Slovakia) Johanka Ivanovičová
10	XD	Thibault Gardon (France); Kathell Desmots-Chacun (France)	110–49 (11–4)	(Slovakia) Alex Petrovič (Slovakia) Lea Kyselicová
Result

=== France vs Singapore ===
(110) France vs Singapore (73); Tuesday, 1 October 2024, 09:30 UTC+8; Nanchang International Sports Center, Court 7
#	Category	France	Score (Partition score)	Singapore
1	MD	Thibault Gardon (France); Ewan Goulin (France)	10–11 (10–11)	(Singapore) Nicholas Kat (Singapore) Nge Joo Jin
2	WS	Malya Hoareau (France)	22–20 (12–9)	(Singapore) Mindy Tan
3	MS	Arthur Tatranov (France)	33–26 (11–6)	(Singapore) Ding Han Jin
4	XD	Tom Lalot Trescarte (France); Elsa Jacob (France)	44–33 (11–7)	(Singapore) Nge Joo Jin (Singapore) Heng Xiao En
5	WD	Elsa Jacob (France); Camille Pognante (France)	55–38 (11–5)	(Singapore) Li Zheng Yan (Singapore) Michelle Zan
6	MD	Thibault Gardon (France); Tom Lalot Trescarte (France)	66–43 (11–5)	(Singapore) Marco Boon (Singapore) Ng Ming Zhe
7	WS	Malya Hoareau (France)	77–49 (11–6)	(Singapore) Mindy Tan
8	MS	Arthur Tatranov (France)	88–56 (11–7)	(Singapore) Ding Han Jin
9	XD	Tom Lalot Trescarte (France); Elsa Jacob (France)	99–69 (11–13)	(Singapore) Nge Joo Jin (Singapore) Heng Xiao En
10	WD	Elsa Jacob (France); Camille Pognante (France)	110–73 (11–4)	(Singapore) Heng Xiao En (Singapore) Michelle Zan
Result

=== Chinese Taipei vs Armenia ===
(110) Chinese Taipei vs Armenia (47); Tuesday, 1 October 2024, 09:30 UTC+8; Nanchang International Sports Center, Court 8
#	Category	Chinese Taipei	Score (Partition score)	Armenia
1	WD	Jheng Yu-chieh (Chinese Taipei); Wang Yu-yun (Chinese Taipei)	11–0 (11–0)	(Armenia) Eliza Hovhannisyan (Armenia) Lusine Smbatyan
2	MS	Cheng Ju-sheng (Chinese Taipei)	22–6 (11–1)	(Armenia) Narek Pogosyan
3	MD	Chiu Chi-ruei (Chinese Taipei); Chiu Shao-hua (Chinese Taipei)	33–12 (11–2)	(Armenia) Edgar Hovhannisyan (Armenia) Hamlet Parsyan
4	WS	Huang Sheng-chun (Chinese Taipei)	44–16 (11–1)	(Armenia) Eliza Hovhannisyan
5	XD	Lin Yi-hao (Chinese Taipei); Huang Ke-xin (Chinese Taipei)	55–20 (11–0)	(Armenia) Hamlet Parsyan (Armenia) Eliza Hovhannisyan
6	WD	Chen Yan-fei (Chinese Taipei); Sun Liang-ching (Chinese Taipei)	66–27 (11–2)	(Armenia) Eliza Hovhannisyan (Armenia) Lusine Smbatyan
7	MS	Chiang Tzu-chieh (Chinese Taipei)	77–31 (11–1)	(Armenia) Hamlet Parsyan
8	MD	Bao Xin Da Gu La Wai (Chinese Taipei); Tsai Cheng-ying (Chinese Taipei)	88–36 (11–1)	(Armenia) Edgar Hovhannisyan (Armenia) Hamlet Parsyan
9	WS	Wang Pei-yu (Chinese Taipei)	99–42 (11–2)	(Armenia) Lusine Smbatyan
10	XD	Bao Xin Da Gu La Wai (Chinese Taipei); Chou Yun-an (Chinese Taipei)	110–47 (11–2)	(Armenia) Narek Pogosyan (Armenia) Lusine Smbatyan
Result

=== Chinese Taipei vs Singapore ===
(110) Chinese Taipei vs Singapore (59); Tuesday, 1 October 2024, 15:30 UTC+8; Nanchang International Sports Center, Court 1
#	Category	Chinese Taipei	Score (Partition score)	Singapore
1	XD	Chiu Shao-hua (Chinese Taipei); Jheng Yu-chieh (Chinese Taipei)	11–7 (11–7)	(Singapore) Nge Joo Jin (Singapore) Heng Xiao En
2	WS	Wang Pei-yu (Chinese Taipei)	22–10 (11–3)	(Singapore) Chia Xin Ying
3	MD	Chiu Shao-hua (Chinese Taipei); Lai Po-yu (Chinese Taipei)	33–18 (11–8)	(Singapore) Nicholas Kat (Singapore) Nge Joo Jin
4	MS	Wu Zhe-ying (Chinese Taipei)	44–23 (11–5)	(Singapore) Justin Tay
5	WD	Chen Yan-fei (Chinese Taipei); Sun Liang-ching (Chinese Taipei)	55–30 (11–7)	(Singapore) Heng Xiao En (Singapore) Michelle Zan
6	XD	Bao Xin Da Gu La Wai (Chinese Taipei); Hsieh Mi-yen (Chinese Taipei)	66–35 (11–5)	(Singapore) Nge Joo Jin (Singapore) Heng Xiao En
7	WS	Huang Sheng-chun (Chinese Taipei)	77–39 (11–4)	(Singapore) Chia Xin Ying
8	MD	Bao Xin Da Gu La Wai (Chinese Taipei); Chiu Shao-hua (Chinese Taipei)	88–42 (11–3)	(Singapore) Nicholas Kat (Singapore) Nge Joo Jin
9	MS	Su Wei-cheng (Chinese Taipei)	99–53 (11–11)	(Singapore) Justin Tay
10	WD	Chou Yun-an (Chinese Taipei); Huang Ke-xin (Chinese Taipei)	110–59 (11–6)	(Singapore) Heng Xiao En (Singapore) Michelle Zan
Result

=== Slovakia vs Armenia ===
(110) Slovakia vs Armenia (55); Tuesday, 1 October 2024, 15:30 UTC+8; Nanchang International Sports Center, Court 2
#	Category	Slovakia	Score (Partition score)	Armenia
1	MS	Alex Petrovič (Slovakia)	11–4 (11–4)	(Armenia) Edgar Hovhannisyan
2	WS	Lea Kyselicová (Slovakia)	22–11 (11–6)	(Armenia) Eliza Hovhannisyan
3	XD	Andrej Suchý (Slovakia); Johanka Ivanovičová (Slovakia)	33–13 (11–2)	(Armenia) Hamlet Parsyan (Armenia) Lusine Smbatyan
4	WD	Karin Goldiánová (Slovakia); Lea Kyselicová (Slovakia)	44–24 (11–9)	(Armenia) Eliza Hovhannisyan (Armenia) Lusine Smbatyan
5	MD	Alex Petrovič (Slovakia); Matúš Poláček (Slovakia)	55–29 (11–5)	(Armenia) Hamlet Parsyan (Armenia) Narek Pogosyan
6	MS	Andrej Suchý (Slovakia)	66–32 (11–3)	(Armenia) Hamlet Parsyan
7	WS	Johanka Ivanovičová (Slovakia)	77–45 (11–13)	(Armenia) Lusine Smbatyan
8	XD	Andrej Suchý (Slovakia); Johanka Ivanovičová (Slovakia)	88–48 (11–3)	(Armenia) Narek Pogosyan (Armenia) Eliza Hovhannisyan
9	WD	Karin Goldiánová (Slovakia); Johanka Ivanovičová (Slovakia)	99–53 (11–5)	(Armenia) Eliza Hovhannisyan (Armenia) Lusine Smbatyan
10	MD	Matúš Poláček (Slovakia); Andrej Suchý (Slovakia)	110–55 (11–2)	(Armenia) Hamlet Parsyan (Armenia) Narek Pogosyan
Result

=== Singapore vs Slovakia ===
(110) Singapore vs Slovakia (78); Wednesday, 2 October 2024, 12:30 UTC+8; Nanchang International Sports Center, Court 3
#	Category	Singapore	Score (Partition score)	Slovakia
1	XD	Nicolas Kat (Singapore); Li Zheng Yan (Singapore)	11–10 (11–10)	(Slovakia) Alex Petrovič (Slovakia) Lea Kyselicová
2	MS	Justin Tay (Singapore)	22–15 (11–5)	(Slovakia) Matúš Poláček
3	WS	Mindy Tan (Singapore)	33–23 (11–8)	(Slovakia) Johanka Ivanovičová
4	WD	Li Zheng Yan (Singapore); Jacqui Tay (Singapore)	44–24 (11–1)	(Slovakia) Karin Goldiánová (Slovakia) Johanka Ivanovičová
5	MD	Marco Boon (Singapore); Ng Ming Zhe (Singapore)	55–38 (11–14)	(Slovakia) Matúš Poláček (Slovakia) Andrej Suchý
6	XD	Ng Ming Zhe (Singapore); Jacqui Tay (Singapore)	66–47 (11–9)	(Slovakia) Andrej Suchý (Slovakia) Johanka Ivanovičová
7	MS	Ding Han Jin (Singapore)	77–49 (11–2)	(Slovakia) Alex Petrovič
8	WS	Aaliyah Zakaria (Singapore)	88–59 (11–10)	(Slovakia) Lea Kyselicová
9	WD	Li Zheng Yan (Singapore); Jacqui Tay (Singapore)	99–64 (11–5)	(Slovakia) Karin Goldiánová (Slovakia) Johanka Ivanovičová
10	MD	Marco Boon (Singapore); Ng Ming Zhe (Singapore)	110–78 (11–14)	(Slovakia) Matúš Poláček (Slovakia) Andrej Suchý
Result

=== Chinese Taipei vs France ===
(110) Chinese Taipei vs France (105); Wednesday, 2 October 2024, 12:30 UTC+8; Nanchang International Sports Center, Court 4
#	Category	Chinese Taipei	Score (Partition score)	France
1	XD	Bao Xin Da Gu La Wai (Chinese Taipei); Jheng Yu-chieh (Chinese Taipei)	6–11 (6–11)	(France) Tom Lalot Trescarte (France) Elsa Jacob
2	MD	Chiu Shao-hua (Chinese Taipei); Lai Po-yu (Chinese Taipei)	16-22 (10-11)	(France) Thibault Gardon (France) Tom Lalot Trescarte
3	WD	Chou Yun-an (Chinese Taipei); Huang Ke-xin (Chinese Taipei)	25-33 (9-11)	(France) Elsa Jacob (France) Camille Pognante
4	WS	Wang Pei-yu (Chinese Taipei)	38-44 (13-11)	(France) Malya Hoareau
5	MS	Wu Zhe-ying (Chinese Taipei)	55-50 (17-6)	(France) Arthur Tatranov
6	XD	Bao Xin Da Gu La Wai (Chinese Taipei); Hsieh Mi-yen (Chinese Taipei)	66-65 (11-15)	(France) Tom Lalot Trescarte (France) Elsa Jacob
7	MD	Chiu Shao-hua (Chinese Taipei); Lai Po-yu (Chinese Taipei)	72-77 (6-12)	(France) Thibault Gardon (France) Tom Lalot Trescarte
8	WD	Chen Yan-fei (Chinese Taipei); Sun Liang-ching (Chinese Taipei)	88-85 (16-8)	(France) Elsa Jacob (France) Camille Pognante
9	WS	Wang Pei-yu (Chinese Taipei)	99-93 (11-8)	(France) Malya Hoareau
10	MS	Su Wei-cheng (Chinese Taipei)	110-105 (11-12)	(France) Arthur Tatranov
Result

== Group C ==
Pos	Team	Pld	W	L	MF	MA	MD	GF	GA	GD	PF	PA	PD	Pts	Qualification
1	Malaysia [3/4]	4	4	0	440	213	+227	40	0	+40	2420	1124	+1296	4	Qualified to knockout stage 1st to 8th
2	Estonia [17/40]	4	3	1	391	332	+59	29	11	+18	2141	1784	+357	3	Qualified to knockout stage 9th to 16th place
3	Netherlands [9/16]	4	2	2	367	361	+6	17	23	−6	1950	2010	−60	2	Qualified to knockout stage 17th to 24th place
4	Norway [17/40]	4	1	3	334	379	−45	14	26	−12	1877	2076	−199	1	Qualified to knockout stage 25th to 32nd place
5	Mongolia [17/40]	4	0	4	193	440	−247	0	40	−40	1026	2420	−1394	0	Qualified to knockout stage 33rd to 40th place

Source: TS

=== Malaysia vs Mongolia ===
(110) Malaysia vs Mongolia (48); Monday, 30 September 2024, 09:00 UTC+8; Nanchang International Sports Center, Court 5
#	Category	Malaysia	Score (Partition score)	Mongolia
1	WS	Ong Xin Yee (Malaysia)	11–3 (11–3)	(Mongolia) Tselmeg-Od Enkhlen
2	WD	Ong Xin Yee (Malaysia); Carmen Ting (Malaysia)	22–6 (11–1)	(Mongolia) Arvinbuyn Bayasgalan (Mongolia) Bolorkhuyag Sarangoo
3	MD	Kang Khai Xing (Malaysia); Aaron Tai (Malaysia)	33–11 (11–1)	(Mongolia) Nyamaa Dorjijav (Mongolia) Khurts-Erdene Enkh-Erdene
4	XD	Datu Anif Isaac Datu Asrah (Malaysia); Dania Sofea (Malaysia)	44–17 (11–2)	(Mongolia) Naranbayar Chinzorig (Mongolia) Darkhanbat Nandin-Erdene
5	MS	Sng Wei Ming (Malaysia)	55–23 (11–3)	(Mongolia) Naranbayar Chinzorig
6	WS	Oo Shan Zi (Malaysia)	66–27 (11–2)	(Mongolia) Darkhanbat Nandin-Erdene
7	WD	Noraqilah Maisarah (Malaysia); Carmen Ting (Malaysia)	77–30 (11–0)	(Mongolia) Tselmeg-Od Enkhlen (Mongolia) Darkhanbat Nandin-Erdene
8	MD	Muhammad Faiq (Malaysia); Lok Hong Quan (Malaysia)	88–36 (11–1)	(Mongolia) Batsaikhan Temuun (Mongolia) Ochirbat Tuvshin
9	XD	Datu Anif Isaac Datu Asrah (Malaysia); Noraqilah Maisarah (Malaysia)	99–44 (11–4)	(Mongolia) Ochirbat Tuvshin (Mongolia) Tselmeg-Od Enkhlen
10	MS	Kong Zhou Swin (Malaysia)	110–48 (11–3)	(Mongolia) Ochirbat Tuvshin
Result

=== Netherlands vs Norway ===
(110) Netherlands vs Norway (95); Monday, 30 September 2024, 09:00 UTC+8; Nanchang International Sports Center, Court 6
#	Category	Netherlands	Score (Partition score)	Norway
1	WD	Sterre Bang (Netherlands); Inger Pothuizen (Netherlands)	9–11 (9–11)	(Norway) Selma Bjørnestøl (Norway) Mina Korssund
2	MS	Dion Hoegen (Netherlands)	18–22 (9–11)	(Norway) Aleksander Jakovlevs
3	WS	Flora Wang (Netherlands)	29–33 (11–11)	(Norway) Linnea Holmedal
4	XD	Joep Strooper (Netherlands); Sterre Bang (Netherlands)	44–41 (15–8)	(Norway) Brynjar Hus (Norway) Linnea Holmedal
5	MD	Casper Spaans (Netherlands); Joep Strooper (Netherlands)	55–46 (11–5)	(Norway) Aleksander Jakovlevs (Norway) Mathias Wong
6	WD	Sterre Bang (Netherlands); Inger Pothuizen (Netherlands)	66–60 (11–14)	(Norway) Selma Bjørnestøl (Norway) Mina Korssund
7	MS	Mats Duwel (Netherlands)	77–72 (11–12)	(Norway) Aleksander Jakovlevs
8	WS	Flora Wang (Netherlands)	88–83 (11–11)	(Norway) Linnea Holmedal
9	XD	Casper Spaans (Netherlands); Inger Pothuizen (Netherlands)	99–89 (11–6)	(Norway) Brynjar Hus (Norway) Linnea Holmedal
10	MD	Casper Spaans (Netherlands); Joep Strooper (Netherlands)	110–95 (11–6)	(Norway) Aleksander Jakovlevs (Norway) Mathias Wong
Result

=== Estonia vs Mongolia ===
(110) Estonia vs Mongolia (50); Monday, 30 September 2024, 15:00 UTC+8; Nanchang International Sports Center, Court 8
#	Category	Estonia	Score (Partition score)	Mongolia
1	WD	Heili Merisalu (Estonia); Emilia Shapovalova (Estonia)	11–5 (11–5)	(Mongolia) Tselmeg-Od Enkhlen (Mongolia) Darkhanbat Nandin-Erdene
2	MD	Oliver Hani (Estonia); Rasmus Roogsoo (Estonia)	22–6 (11–1)	(Mongolia) Nyamaa Dorjijav (Mongolia) Khurts-Erdene Enkh-Erdene
3	WS	Romili Vakk (Estonia)	33–11 (11–?)	(Mongolia) Darkhanbat Nandin-Erdene
4	XD	Rasmus Talts (Estonia); Lumikki Liias (Estonia)	44–20 (11–5)	(Mongolia) Ochirbat Tuvshin (Mongolia) Tselmeg-Od Enkhlen
5	MS	Andrei Schmidt (Estonia)	55–24 (11–?)	(Mongolia) Naranbayar Chinzorig
6	WD	Lumikki Liias (Estonia); Romili Vakk (Estonia)	66–30 (11–5)	(Mongolia) Arvinbuyn Bayasgalan (Mongolia) Bolorkhuyag Sarangoo
7	MD	Rasmus Roogsoo (Estonia); Rasmus Talts (Estonia)	77–32 (11–2)	(Mongolia) Batsaikhan Temuun (Mongolia) Ochirbat Tuvshin
8	WS	Marija Paskotši (Estonia)	88–40 (11–?)	(Mongolia) Tselmeg-Od Enkhlen
9	XD	Andrei Schmidt (Estonia); Lumikki Liias (Estonia)	99–43 (11–3)	(Mongolia) Nyamaa Dorjijav (Mongolia) Darkhanbat Nandin-Erdene
10	MS	Andrei Schmidt (Estonia)	110–50 (11–?)	(Mongolia) Ochirbat Tuvshin
Result

=== Malaysia vs Norway ===
(110) Malaysia vs Norway (51); Monday, 30 September 2024, 15:00 UTC+8; Nanchang International Sports Center, Court 6
#	Category	Malaysia	Score (Partition score)	Norway
1	WS	Ong Xin Yee (Malaysia)	11–4 (11–4)	(Norway) Selma Bjørnestøl
2	MD	Kang Khai Xing (Malaysia); Aaron Tai (Malaysia)	22–10 (11–?)	(Norway) Brynjar Hus (Norway) Jakob Langeland Risa
3	XD	Datu Anif Isaac Datu Asrah (Malaysia); Noraqilah Maisarah (Malaysia)	33–18 (11–?)	(Norway) Aleksander Jakovlevs (Norway) Mina Korssund
4	WD	Dania Sofea (Malaysia); Carmen Ting (Malaysia)	44–19 (11–?)	(Norway) Linnea Holmedal (Norway) Mina Korssund
5	MS	Muhammad Faiq (Malaysia)	55–24 (11–6)	(Norway) Mathias Wong
6	WS	Oo Shan Zi (Malaysia)	66–33 (11–7)	(Norway) Linnea Holmedal
7	MD	Muhammad Faiq (Malaysia); Lok Hong Quan (Malaysia)	77–34 (11–1)	(Norway) Brynjar Hus (Norway) Jakob Langeland Risa
8	XD	Kang Khai Xing (Malaysia); Dania Sofea (Malaysia)	88–38 (11–3)	(Norway) Matthias Wong (Norway) Selma Bjørnestøl
9	WD	Ong Xin Yee (Malaysia); Carmen Ting (Malaysia)	99–41 (11–1)	(Norway) Linnea Holmedal (Norway) Mina Korssund
10	MS	Sng Wei Ming (Malaysia)	110–51 (11–6)	(Norway) Jakob Langeland Risa
Result

=== Netherlands vs Mongolia ===
(110) Netherlands vs Mongolia (46); Tuesday, 1 October 2024, 09:30 UTC+8; Nanchang International Sports Center, Court 1
#	Category	Netherlands	Score (Partition score)	Mongolia
1	MS	Dion Hoegen (Netherlands)	11–0 (11–0)	(Mongolia) Bumbayar Erdenechimeg
2	XD	Casper Spaans (Netherlands); Inger Pothuizen (Netherlands)	22–8 (11–3)	(Mongolia) Ochirbat Tuvshin (Mongolia) Darkhanbat Nandin-Erdene
3	WD	Sterre Bang (Netherlands); Inger Pothuizen (Netherlands)	33–14 (11–?)	(Mongolia) Arvinbuyn Bayasgalan (Mongolia) Bolorkhuyag Sarangoo
4	WS	Mandy Duijndam (Netherlands)	44–17 (11–?)	(Mongolia) Ganbat Enkhjin
5	MD	Casper Spaans (Netherlands); Joep Strooper (Netherlands)	55–20 (11–0)	(Mongolia) Nyamaa Dorjijav (Mongolia) Khurts-Erdene Enkh-Erdene
6	MS	Mats Duwel (Netherlands)	66–30 (11–?)	(Mongolia) Naranbayar Chinzorig
7	XD	Joep Strooper (Netherlands); Sterre Bang (Netherlands)	77–32 (11–2)	(Mongolia) Bumbayar Erdenechimeg (Mongolia) Ganbat Enkhjin
8	WD	Mandy Duijndam (Netherlands); Flora Wang (Netherlands)	88–40 (11–?)	(Mongolia) Tselmeg-Od Enkhlen (Mongolia) Darkhanbat Nandin-Erdene
9	WS	Flora Wang (Netherlands)	99–41 (11–?)	(Mongolia) Tselmeg-Od Enkhlen
10	MD	Mats Duwel (Netherlands); Dion Hoegen (Netherlands)	110–46 (11–1)	(Mongolia) Batsaikhan Temuun (Mongolia) Ochirbat Tuvshin
Result

=== Malaysia vs Estonia ===
(110) Malaysia vs Estonia (61); Tuesday, 1 October 2024, 09:30 UTC+8; Nanchang International Sports Center, Court 2
#	Category	Malaysia	Score (Partition score)	Estonia
1	XD	Datu Anif Isaac Datu Asrah (Malaysia); Dania Sofea (Malaysia)	11–3 (11–3)	(Estonia) Rasmus Talts (Estonia) Emilia Shapovalova
2	WS	Oo Shan Zi (Malaysia)	22–8 (11–?)	(Estonia) Romili Vakk
3	MD	Muhammad Faiq (Malaysia); Lok Hong Quan (Malaysia)	33–14 (11–4)	(Estonia) Rasmus Roogsoo (Estonia) Rasmus Talts
4	MS	Kong Zhou Swin (Malaysia)	44–22 (11–7)	(Estonia) Oliver Hani
5	WD	Dania Sofea (Malaysia); Carmen Ting (Malaysia)	55–26 (11–?)	(Estonia) Lumikki Liias (Estonia) Marija Paskotši
6	XD	Aaron Tai (Malaysia); Noraqilah Maisarah (Malaysia)	66–37 (11–?)	(Estonia) Andrei Schmidt (Estonia) Heili Merisalu
7	WS	Ong Xin Yee (Malaysia)	77–47 (11–?)	(Estonia) Marija Paskotši
8	MD	Kang Khai Xing (Malaysia); Aaron Tai (Malaysia)	88–52 (11–5)	(Estonia) Oliver Hani (Estonia) Rasmus Roogsoo
9	MS	Sng Wei Wang (Malaysia)	99–57 (11–5)	(Estonia) Andrei Schmidt
10	WD	Ong Xin Yee (Malaysia); Carmin Ting (Malaysia)	110–61 (11–?)	(Estonia) Lumikki Liias (Estonia) Romili Vakk
Result

=== Norway vs Mongolia ===
(110) Norway vs Mongolia (49); Tuesday, 1 October 2024, 15:30 UTC+8; Nanchang International Sports Center, Court 4
#	Category	Norway	Score (Partition score)	Mongolia
1	MS	Aleksander Jakovlevs (Norway)	11–5 (11–5)	(Mongolia) Naranbayar Chinzorig
2	XD	Brynjar Hus (Norway); Linnea Holmedal (Norway)	22–6 (11–1)	(Mongolia) Bumbayar Erdenechimeg (Mongolia) Ganbat Enkhjin
3	MD	Brynjar Hus (Norway); Jakob Langeland Risa (Norway)	33–14 (11–4)	(Mongolia) Batsaikhan Temuun (Mongolia) Ochirbat Tuvshin
4	WS	Selma Bjørnestøl (Norway)	44–22 (11–7)	(Mongolia) Ganbat Enkhjin
5	WD	Linnea Holmedal (Norway); Mina Korssund (Norway)	55–23 (11–?)	(Mongolia) Arvinbuyn Bayasgalan (Mongolia) Bolorkhuyag Sarangoo
6	MS	Mathias Wong (Norway)	66–30 (11–5)	(Mongolia) Bumbayar Erdenechimeg
7	XD	Jakob Langeland Risa (Norway); Linnea Holmedal (Norway)	77–38 (11–8)	(Mongolia) Ochirbat Tuvshin (Mongolia) Darkhanbat Nandin-Erdene
8	MD	Aleksander Jakovlevs (Norway); Mathias Wong (Norway)	88–40 (11–2)	(Mongolia) Nyamaa Dorjijav (Mongolia) Khurts-Erdene Enkh-Erdene
9	WS	Mina Korssund (Norway)	99–45 (11–5)	(Mongolia) Tselmeg-Od Enkhlen
10	WD	Selma Bjørnestøl (Norway); Mina Korssund (Norway)	110–49 (11–4)	(Mongolia) Tselmeg-Od Enkhlen (Mongolia) Darkhanbat Nandin-Erdene
Result

=== Estonia vs Netherlands ===
(110) Estonia vs Netherlands (94); Tuesday, 1 October 2024, 15:30 UTC+8; Nanchang International Sports Center, Court 3
#	Category	Estonia	Score (Partition score)	Netherlands
1	MD	Rasmus Roogsoo (Estonia); Rasmus Talts (Estonia)	11–6 (11–6)	(Netherlands) Casper Spaans (Netherlands) Joep Strooper
2	MS	Andrei Schmidt (Estonia)	22–13 (11–7)	(Netherlands) Mats Duwel
3	XD	Rasmus Talts (Estonia); Lumikki Liias (Estonia)	33–18 (11–5)	(Netherlands) Casper Spaans (Netherlands) Sterre Bang
4	WD	Lumikki Liias (Estonia); Marija Paskotši (Estonia)	44–38 (11–20)	(Netherlands) Sterre Bang (Netherlands) Inger Pothuizen
5	WS	Marija Paskotši (Estonia)	55–46 (11–8)	(Netherlands) Flora Wang
6	MD	Andrei Schmidt (Estonia); Rasmus Talts (Estonia)	66–54 (11–8)	(Netherlands) Casper Spaans (Netherlands) Joep Strooper
7	MS	Andrei Schmidt (Estonia)	77–58 (11–4)	(Netherlands) Dion Hoegen
8	XD	Andrei Schmidt (Estonia); Heili Merisalu (Estonia)	88–69 (11-11)	(Netherlands) Joep Strooper (Netherlands) Sterre Bang
9	WD	Lumikki Liias (Estonia); Marija Paskotši (Estonia)	99–76 (11–7)	(Netherlands) Sterre Bang (Netherlands) Flora Wang
10	WS	Marija Paskotši (Estonia)	110–94 (11-18)	(Netherlands) Flora Wang
Result

=== Estonia vs Norway ===
(110) Estonia vs Norway (78); Wednesday, 2 October 2024, 12:30 UTC+8; Nanchang International Sports Center, Court 5
#	Category	Estonia	Score (Partition score)	Norway
1	WD	Emilia Shapovalova (Estonia); Romili Vakk (Estonia)	11–9 (11–9)	(Norway) Linnea Holmedal (Norway) Mina Korssund
2	MD	Oliver Hani (Estonia); Andrei Schmidt (Estonia)	21-22 (10-13)	(Norway) Brynjar Hus (Norway) Jakob Langeland Risa
3	WS	Romili Vakk (Estonia)	33–29 (12–7)	(Norway) Linnea Holmedal
4	XD	Lumikki Liias (Estonia); Marija Paskotši (Estonia)	44–29 (11-0)	(Norway) Mathias Wong (Norway) Selma Bjørnestøl
5	MS	Andrei Schmidt (Estonia)	55–33 (11–4)	(Norway) Mathias Wong
6	WD	Lumikki Liias (Estonia); Marija Paskotši (Estonia)	66–49 (11-16)	(Norway) Linnea Holmedal (Norway) Mina Korssund
7	MD	Rasmus Roogsoo (Estonia); Rasmus Talts (Estonia)	77–57 (11-8)	(Norway) Brynjar Hus (Norway) Jakob Langeland Risa
8	WS	Marija Paskotši (Estonia)	88–66 (11-9)	(Norway) Linnea Holmedal
9	XD	Andrei Schmidt (Estonia); Heili Merisalu (Estonia)	99–74 (11–8)	(Norway) Aleksander Jakovlevs (Norway) Mina Korssund
10	MS	Andrei Schmidt (Estonia)	110–78 (11-4)	(Norway) Aleksander Jakovlevs
Result

=== Malaysia vs Netherlands ===
(110) Malaysia vs Netherlands (53); Wednesday, 2 October 2024, 12:30 UTC+8; Nanchang International Sports Center, Court 6
#	Category	Malaysia	Score (Partition score)	Netherlands
1	WD	Dania Sofea (Malaysia); Carmen Ting (Malaysia)	11–2 (11–2)	(Netherlands) Sterre Bang (Netherlands) Mandy Duijndam
2	MS	Muhammad Faiq (Malaysia)	22–11 (11–9)	(Netherlands) Mats Duwel
3	MD	Kang Khai Xing (Malaysia); Aaron Tai (Malaysia)	33–16 (11–5)	(Netherlands) Casper Spaans (Netherlands) Joep Strooper
4	WS	Ong Xin Yee (Malaysia)	44–22 (11–6)	(Netherlands) Inger Pothuizen
5	XD	Kang Khai Xing (Malaysia); Dania Sofea (Malaysia)	55–28 (11–6)	(Netherlands) Joep Strooper (Netherlands) Sterre Bang
6	WD	Ong Xin Yee (Malaysia); Carmen Ting (Malaysia)	66–29 (11–1)	(Netherlands) Sterre Bang (Netherlands) Inger Pothuizen
7	WS	Sng Wei Ming (Malaysia)	77–35 (11–5)	(Netherlands) Dion Hoegen
8	MD	Muhammad Faiq (Malaysia); Lok Hong Quan (Malaysia)	88–40 (11–5)	(Netherlands) Casper Spaans (Netherlands) Joep Strooper
9	WS	Oo Shan Zi (Malaysia)	99–42 (11–2)	(Netherlands) Flora Wang
10	XD	Datu Anif Isaac Datu Asrah (Malaysia); Noraqilah Maisarah (Malaysia)	110–53 (11–?)	(Netherlands) Casper Spaans (Netherlands) Inger Pothuizen
Result

== Group D ==
Pos	Team	Pld	W	L	MF	MA	MD	GF	GA	GD	PF	PA	PD	Pts	Qualification
1	Denmark [9/16]	4	4	0	440	255	+185	40	0	+40	2420	1333	+1087	4	Qualified to knockout stage 1st to 8th
2	United Arab Emirates [5/8]	4	3	1	422	283	+139	30	10	+20	2272	1470	+802	3	Qualified to knockout stage 9th to 16th place
3	New Zealand [17/40]	4	2	2	360	332	+28	20	20	0	1941	1786	+155	2	Qualified to knockout stage 17th to 24th place
4	Cook Islands [17/40]	4	1	3	267	411	−144	9	31	−22	1400	2194	−794	1	Qualified to knockout stage 25th to 32nd place
5	Trinidad and Tobago [17/40]	4	0	4	232	440	−208	1	39	−38	1169	2419	−1250	0	Qualified to knockout stage 33rd to 40th place

Source: TS

=== Denmark vs Trinidad and Tobago ===
(110) Denmark vs Trinidad and Tobago (45); Monday, 30 September 2024, 09:00 UTC+8; Nanchang International Sports Center, Court 2
#	Category	Denmark	Score (Partition score)	Trinidad and Tobago
1	MS	William Bøgebjerg (Denmark)	11–3 (11–3)	(Trinidad and Tobago) Vishal Ramsubhag
2	MD	Robert Nebel (Denmark); Otto Reiler (Denmark)	22–10 (11–5)	(Trinidad and Tobago) Vishal Ramsubhag (Trinidad and Tobago) Jace Smith
3	WS	Kajsa Van Dalm (Denmark)	33–12 (11–2)	(Trinidad and Tobago) Samiya Karim
4	XD	Jakob Clausen Jessen (Denmark); Anna-Sofie Nielsen (Denmark)	44–18 (11–3)	(Trinidad and Tobago) Vishal Ramsubhag (Trinidad and Tobago) Samiya Karim
5	WD	Amanda Aarrebo Petersen (Denmark); Maria Højlund Tommerup (Denmark)	55–20 (Walkover)	(Trinidad and Tobago) (Trinidad and Tobago)
6	MS	Salomon Adam Thomasen (Denmark)	66–29 (11–4)	(Trinidad and Tobago) Jace Smith
7	MD	Philip Kryger Boe (Denmark); Jakob Clausen Jessen (Denmark)	77–31 (11–1)	(Trinidad and Tobago) Vishal Ramsubhag (Trinidad and Tobago) Jace Smith
8	WS	Kajsa Van Dalm (Denmark)	88–37 (11–2)	(Trinidad and Tobago) Samiya Karim
9	XD	Robert Nebel (Denmark); Jasmin Willis (Denmark)	99–42 (11–2)	(Trinidad and Tobago) Jace Smith (Trinidad and Tobago) Samiya Karim
10	WD	Anna-Sofie Nielsen (Denmark); Jasmin Willis (Denmark)	110–45 (Walkover)	(Trinidad and Tobago) (Trinidad and Tobago)
Result

=== United Arab Emirates vs Cook Islands ===
(110) United Arab Emirates vs Cook Islands (56); Monday, 30 September 2024, 09:00 UTC+8; Nanchang International Sports Center, Court 8
#	Category	United Arab Emirates	Score (Partition score)	Cook Islands
1	MS	Bharath Latheesh (United Arab Emirates)	11–3 (11–3)	(Cook Islands) Daniel Akavi
2	WS	Taralaxmi Karthikeyan (United Arab Emirates)	22–9 (11–4)	(Cook Islands) Lana Toa
3	MD	Dev Ayyappan (United Arab Emirates); Dhiren Ayyappan (United Arab Emirates)	33–13 (11–3)	(Cook Islands) Edward Patai (Cook Islands) Makea Pauka
4	XD	Dev Ayyappan (United Arab Emirates); Taabia Khan (United Arab Emirates)	44–17 (11–2)	(Cook Islands) Emanuela Mataio (Cook Islands) Tereapii Akavi
5	WD	Mysha Omer Khan (United Arab Emirates); Taabia Khan (United Arab Emirates)	55–25 (11–5)	(Cook Islands) Tereapii Akavi (Cook Islands) Te Pa O Te Rangi Tupa
6	MS	Dev Vishnu (United Arab Emirates)	66–27 (11–2)	(Cook Islands) Makea Pauka
7	WS	Mysha Omer Khan (United Arab Emirates)	77–37 (11–7)	(Cook Islands) Te Pa O Te Rangi Tupa
8	MD	Bharath Latheesh (United Arab Emirates); Dev Vishnu (United Arab Emirates)	88–38 (11–1)	(Cook Islands) Emanuela Mataio (Cook Islands) Kaiyin Mataio
9	XD	Dhiren Ayyappan (United Arab Emirates); Taabia Khan (United Arab Emirates)	99–41 (11–1)	(Cook Islands) Kaiyin Mataio (Cook Islands) Te Pa O Te Rangi Tupa
10	WD	Taralaxmi Karthikeyan (United Arab Emirates); Sakshi Kurbkhelgi (United Arab Emirates)	110–56 (11–11)	(Cook Islands) Tereapii Akavi (Cook Islands) Te Pa O Te Rangi Tupa
Result

=== New Zealand vs Cook Islands ===
(110) New Zealand vs Cook Islands (53); Monday, 30 September 2024, 15:00 UTC+8; Nanchang International Sports Center, Court 1
#	Category	New Zealand	Score (Partition score)	Cook Islands
1	WD	Mia Xu (New Zealand); Qixuan Yang (New Zealand)	11–3 (11–3)	(Cook Islands) Tereapii Akavi (Cook Islands) Te Pa O Te Rangi Tupa
2	WS	Yanxi Liu (New Zealand)	22–6 (11–1)	(Cook Islands) Lana Toa
3	MS	Alex Galt (New Zealand)	33–13 (11–3)	(Cook Islands) Emmanuel Mataio
4	MD	Raphael Chris Deloy (New Zealand); Jaden Mingoa (New Zealand)	44–21 (11–6)	(Cook Islands) Emanuela Mataio (Cook Islands) Kaiyin Mataio
5	XD	Lezhi Zhu (New Zealand); Qixuan Yang (New Zealand)	55–29 (11–8)	(Cook Islands) Kaiyin Mataio (Cook Islands) Te Pa O Te Rangi Tupa
6	WD	Mia Xu (New Zealand); Josephine Zhao (New Zealand)	66–32 (11–3)	(Cook Islands) Tereapii Akavi (Cook Islands) Te Pa O Te Rangi Tupa
7	WS	Josephine Zhao (New Zealand)	77–34 (11–2)	(Cook Islands) Te Pa O Te Rangi Tupa
8	MS	Jay Xuan Tan (New Zealand)	88–40 (11–5)	(Cook Islands) Kaiyin Mataio
9	MD	Jay Xuan Tan (New Zealand); Lezhi Zhu (New Zealand)	99–50 (11–10)	(Cook Islands) Emanuela Mataio (Cook Islands) Kaiyin Mataio
10	XD	Raphael Chris Deloy (New Zealand); Yanxi Liu (New Zealand)	110–53 (11-3)	(Cook Islands) Emanuela Mataio (Cook Islands) Tereapii Akavi
Result

=== United Arab Emirates vs Trinidad and Tobago ===
(110) United Arab Emirates vs Trinidad and Tobago (47); Monday, 30 September 2024, 15:00 UTC+8; Nanchang International Sports Center, Court 2
#	Category	United Arab Emirates	Score (Partition score)	Trinidad and Tobago
1	WD	Mysha Omer Khan (United Arab Emirates); Taabia Khan (United Arab Emirates)	11–0 (Walkover)	(Trinidad and Tobago) (Trinidad and Tobago)
2	MD	Bharath Latheesh (United Arab Emirates); Dev Vishnu (United Arab Emirates)	22–11 (11–6)	(Trinidad and Tobago) Vishal Ramsubhag (Trinidad and Tobago) Jace Smith
3	WS	Mysha Omer Khan (United Arab Emirates)	33–12 (11–?)	(Trinidad and Tobago) Samiya Karim
4	XD	Dev Ayyappan (United Arab Emirates); Taabia Khan (United Arab Emirates)	44–17 (11–2)	(Trinidad and Tobago) Vishal Ramsubhag (Trinidad and Tobago) Samiya Karim
5	MS	Dev Vishnu (United Arab Emirates)	55–22 (11–2)	(Trinidad and Tobago) Jace Smith
6	WD	Taralaxmi Karthikeyan (United Arab Emirates); Sakshi Kurbkhelgi (United Arab Emirates)	66–25 (Walkover)	(Trinidad and Tobago) (Trinidad and Tobago)
7	MD	Dev Ayyappan (United Arab Emirates); Dhiren Ayyappan (United Arab Emirates)	77–34 (11–?)	(Trinidad and Tobago) Vishal Ramsubhag (Trinidad and Tobago) Jace Smith
8	WS	Sakshi Kurbkhelgi (United Arab Emirates)	88–38 (11–3)	(Trinidad and Tobago) Samiya Karim
9	XD	Dhiren Ayyappan (United Arab Emirates); Taabia Khan (United Arab Emirates)	99–44 (11–4)	(Trinidad and Tobago) Jace Smith (Trinidad and Tobago) Samiya Karim
10	MS	Bharath Latheesh (United Arab Emirates)	110–47 (11–?)	(Trinidad and Tobago) Vishal Ramsubhag
Result

=== Denmark vs Cook Islands ===
(110) Denmark vs Cook Islands (48); Tuesday, 1 October 2024, 09:30 UTC+8; Nanchang International Sports Center, Court 3
#	Category	Denmark	Score (Partition score)	Cook Islands
1	WS	Jasmin Willis (Denmark)	11–0 (11–0)	(Cook Islands) Tuaine Nicholas-Herman
2	MS	Salomon Adam Thomasen (Denmark)	22–8 (11–3)	(Cook Islands) Makea Pauka
3	WD	Anna-Sofie Nielsen (Denmark); Jasmin Willis (Denmark)	33–12 (11–2)	(Cook Islands) Tereapii Akavi (Cook Islands) Te Pa O Te Rangi Tupa
4	XD	Robert Nebel (Denmark); Jasmin Willis (Denmark)	44–18 (11–3)	(Cook Islands) Edward Patai (Cook Islands) Tereapii Akavi
5	MD	Robert Nebel (Denmark); Otto Reiler (Denmark)	55–21 (11–1)	(Cook Islands) Emanuela Mataio (Cook Islands) Kaiyin Mataio
6	WS	Jasmin Willis (Denmark)	66–26 (11–1)	(Cook Islands) Tereapii Akavi
7	MS	Salomon Adam Thomasen (Denmark)	77–32 (11–2)	(Cook Islands) Daniel Akavi
8	WD	Anna-Sofie Nielsen (Denmark); Amanda Aarrebo Petersen (Denmark)	88–38 (11–3)	(Cook Islands) Tuaine Nicholas-Herman (Cook Islands) Lana Toa
9	XD	Otto Reiler (Denmark); Amanda Aarrebo Petersen (Denmark)	99–46 (11–6)	(Cook Islands) Daniel Akavi (Cook Islands) Lana Toa
10	MD	Philip Kryger Boe (Denmark); Jakob Clausen Jessen (Denmark)	110–48 (11-2)	(Cook Islands) Edward Patai (Cook Islands) Makea Pauka
Result

=== United Arab Emirates vs New Zealand ===
(110) United Arab Emirates vs New Zealand (70); Tuesday, 1 October 2024, 09:30 UTC+8; Nanchang International Sports Center, Court 6
#	Category	United Arab Emirates	Score (Partition score)	New Zealand
1	MS	Dev Vishnu (United Arab Emirates)	11–4 (11–4)	(New Zealand) Alex Galt
2	WD	Mysha Omer Khan (United Arab Emirates); Taabia Khan (United Arab Emirates)	22–11 (11–6)	(New Zealand) Yanxi Liu (New Zealand) Qixuan Yang
3	MD	Dev Ayyappan (United Arab Emirates); Dhiren Ayyappan (United Arab Emirates)	33–16 (11–?)	(New Zealand) Raphael Chris Deloy (New Zealand) Lezhi Zhu
4	WS	Mysha Omer Khan (United Arab Emirates)	44–17 (11–1)	(New Zealand) Josephine Zhao
5	XD	Dev Ayyappan (United Arab Emirates); Taabia Khan (United Arab Emirates)	55–33 (11-13)	(New Zealand) Raphael Chris Deloy (New Zealand) Yanxi Liu
6	MS	Bharath Latheesh (United Arab Emirates)	66–40 (11–7)	(New Zealand) Lezhi Zhu
7	WD	Mysha Omer Khan (United Arab Emirates); Taabia Khan (United Arab Emirates)	77–46 (11–6)	(New Zealand) Mia Xu (New Zealand) Josephine Zhao
8	MD	Dev Ayyappan (United Arab Emirates); Dhiren Ayyappan (United Arab Emirates)	88–51 (11–?)	(New Zealand) Raphael Chris Deloy (New Zealand) Lezhi Zhu
9	WS	Mysha Omer Khan (United Arab Emirates)	99–61 (11–?)	(New Zealand) Josephine Zhao
10	XD	Dhiren Ayyappan (United Arab Emirates); Taabia Khan (United Arab Emirates)	110–70 (11–9)	(New Zealand) Raphael Chris Deloy (New Zealand) Lezhi Zhu
Result

=== Cook Islands vs Trinidad and Tobago ===
(110) Cook Islands vs Trinidad and Tobago (81); Tuesday, 1 October 2024, 15:30 UTC+8; Nanchang International Sports Center, Court 6
#	Category	Cook Islands	Score (Partition score)	Trinidad and Tobago
1	WS	Lana Toa (Cook Islands)	10-11 (10-11)	(Trinidad and Tobago) Samiya Karim
2	WD	Tereapii Akavi (Cook Islands); Te Pa O Te Rangi Tupa (Cook Islands)	22–11 (Walkover)	(Trinidad and Tobago) (Trinidad and Tobago)
3	MD	Emanuela Mataio (Cook Islands); Kaiyin Mataio (Cook Islands)	33–18 (11–7)	(Trinidad and Tobago) Vishal Ramsubhag (Trinidad and Tobago) Jace Smith
4	MS	Kaiyin Mataio (Cook Islands)	44–25 (11–7)	(Trinidad and Tobago) Jace Smith
5	XD	Kaiyin Mataio (Cook Islands); Te Pa O Te Rangi Tupa (Cook Islands)	55–29 (11-4)	(Trinidad and Tobago) Jace Smith (Trinidad and Tobago) Samiya Khan
6	WS	Te Pa O Te Rangi Tupa (Cook Islands)	66–39 (11–10)	(Trinidad and Tobago) Samiya Karim
7	WD	Tereapii Akavi (Cook Islands); Te Pa O Te Rangi Tupa (Cook Islands)	77–39 (Walkover)	(Trinidad and Tobago) (Trinidad and Tobago)
8	MD	Emanuela Mataio (Cook Islands); Kaiyin Mataio (Cook Islands)	88–54 (11-15)	(Trinidad and Tobago) Vishal Ramsubhag (Trinidad and Tobago) Jace Smith
9	MS	Daniel Akavi (Cook Islands)	99–72 (11-18)	(Trinidad and Tobago) Vishal Ramsubhag
10	XD	Emanuela Mataio (Cook Islands); Tereapii Akavi (Cook Islands)	110–81 (11–9)	(Trinidad and Tobago) Vishal Ramsubhag (Trinidad and Tobago) Samiya Karim
Result

=== Denmark vs New Zealand ===
(110) Denmark vs New Zealand (70); Tuesday, 1 October 2024, 15:30 UTC+8; Nanchang International Sports Center, Court 5
#	Category	Denmark	Score (Partition score)	New Zealand
1	MS	Philip Kryger Boe (Denmark)	11–6 (11–6)	(New Zealand) Jay Xuan Tan
2	WD	Amanda Aarrebo Petersen (Denmark); Maria Højlund Tommerup (Denmark)	22–13 (11–7)	(New Zealand) Qixuan Yang (New Zealand) Josephine Zhao
3	WS	Jasmin Willis (Denmark)	33–23 (11–10)	(New Zealand) Mia Xu
4	XD	Jakob Clausen Jessen (Denmark); Anna-Sofie Nielsen (Denmark)	44–34 (11-11)	(New Zealand) Raphael Chris Deloy (New Zealand) Yanxi Liu
5	MD	Philip Kryger Boe (Denmark); Jakob Clausen Jessen (Denmark)	55–39 (11–5)	(New Zealand) Jaden Mingoa (New Zealand) Jay Xuan Tan
6	MS	William Bøgebjerg (Denmark)	66–42 (11–3)	(New Zealand) Lezhi Zhu
7	WD	Anna-Sofie Nielsen (Denmark); Amanda Aarrebo Petersen (Denmark)	77–43 (11–1)	(New Zealand) Mia Xu (New Zealand) Qixuan Yang
8	WS	Jasmin Willis (Denmark)	88–52 (11–9)	(New Zealand) Yanxi Liu
9	XD	Otto Reiler (Denmark); Amanda Aarrebo Petersen (Denmark)	99–60 (11–?)	(New Zealand) Lezhi Zhu (New Zealand) Qixuan Yang
10	MD	Robert Nebel (Denmark); Otto Reiler (Denmark)	110–70 (11-10	(New Zealand) Raphael Chris Deloy (New Zealand) Jaden Mingoa
Result

=== New Zealand vs Trinidad and Tobago ===
(110) New Zealand vs Trinidad and Tobago (59); Wednesday, 2 October 2024, 12:30 UTC+8; Nanchang International Sports Center, Court 8
#	Category	New Zealand	Score (Partition score)	Trinidad and Tobago
1	WD	Yanxi Liu (New Zealand); Josephine Zhao (New Zealand)	11–0 (Walkover)	(Trinidad and Tobago) (Trinidad and Tobago)
2	MS	Jay Xuan Tan (New Zealand)	22–11 (11–6)	(Trinidad and Tobago) Jace Smith
3	WS	Yanxi Liu (New Zealand)	33–13 (11–2)	(Trinidad and Tobago) Samiya Karim
4	XD	Raphael Chris Deloy (New Zealand); Josephine Zhao (New Zealand)	44–21 (11-6)	(Trinidad and Tobago) Jace Smith (Trinidad and Tobago) Samiya Khan
5	MD	Raphael Chris Deloy (New Zealand); Jay Xuan Tan (New Zealand)	55–26 (11-5)	(Trinidad and Tobago) Vishal Ramsubhag (Trinidad and Tobago) Jace Smith
6	WD	Mia Xu (New Zealand); Qixuan Yang (New Zealand)	66–26 (Walkover)	(Trinidad and Tobago) (Trinidad and Tobago)
7	MS	Jay Xuan Tan (New Zealand)	77–41 (11-11)	(Trinidad and Tobago) Vishal Ramsubhag
8	WS	Mia Xu (New Zealand)	88–46 (11-5)	(Trinidad and Tobago) Samiya Karim
9	XD	Lezhi Zhu (New Zealand); Qixuan Yang (New Zealand)	99–52 (11–6)	(Trinidad and Tobago) Vishal Ramsubhag (Trinidad and Tobago) Samiya Karim
10	MD	Jay Xuan Tan (New Zealand); Lezhi Zhu (New Zealand)	110–59 (11–7)	(Trinidad and Tobago) Vishal Ramsubhag (Trinidad and Tobago) Jace Smith
Result

=== Denmark vs United Arab Emirates ===
(110) Denmark vs United Arab Emirates (92); Wednesday, 2 October 2024, 12:30 UTC+8; Nanchang International Sports Center, Court 7
#	Category	Denmark	Score (Partition score)	United Arab Emirates
1	WS	Kajsa Van Dalm (Denmark)	11–10 (11–10)	(United Arab Emirates) Mysha Omer Khan
2	XD	Otto Reiler (Denmark); Amanda Aarrebo Petersen (Denmark)	22–17 (11-7)	(United Arab Emirates) Dhiren Ayyappan (United Arab Emirates) Taabia Khan
3	WD	Anna-Sofie Nielsen (Denmark); Amanda Aarrebo Petersen (Denmark)	33–21 (11-4)	(United Arab Emirates) Mysha Omer Khan (United Arab Emirates) Taabia Khan
4	MD	Philip Kryger Boe (Denmark); Jakob Clausen Jessen (Denmark)	44–26 (11-5)	(United Arab Emirates) Bharath Latheesh (United Arab Emirates) Dev Vishnu
5	MS	William Bøgebjerg (Denmark)	55–41 (11-15)	(United Arab Emirates) Dev Vishnu
6	WS	Kajsa Van Dalm (Denmark)	66–52 (11-11)	(United Arab Emirates) Sakshi Kurbkhelgi
7	XD	Otto Reiler (Denmark); Amanda Aarrebo Petersen (Denmark)	77–60 (11–?)	(United Arab Emirates) Dev Vishnu (United Arab Emirates) Taabia Khan
8	WD	Anna-Sofie Nielsen (Denmark); Amanda Aarrebo Petersen (Denmark)	88–64 (11–?)	(United Arab Emirates) Mysha Omer Khan (United Arab Emirates) Taabia Khan
9	MD	Robert Nebel (Denmark); Otto Reiler (Denmark)	99–74 (11–?)	(United Arab Emirates) Dev Ayyappan (United Arab Emirates) Dhiren Ayyappan
10	MS	William Bøgebjerg (Denmark)	110–92 (11-?)	(United Arab Emirates) Bharath Latheesh
Result

== Group E ==
Pos	Team	Pld	W	L	MF	MA	MD	GF	GA	GD	PF	PA	PD	Pts	Qualification
1	India [5/8]	4	4	0	440	253	+187	39	1	+38	2416	1361	+1055	4	Qualified to knockout stage 1st to 8th
2	Turkey [9/16]	4	3	1	429	321	+108	28	12	+16	2336	1778	+558	3	Qualified to knockout stage 9th to 16th place
3	Peru [17/40]	4	2	2	359	398	−39	16	24	−8	1959	2276	−317	2	Qualified to knockout stage 17th to 24th place
4	Mauritius [17/40]	4	1	3	302	412	−110	11	29	−18	1721	2208	−487	1	Qualified to knockout stage 25th to 32nd place
5	Azerbaijan [17/40]	4	0	4	294	440	−146	6	34	−28	1575	2384	−809	0	Qualified to knockout stage 33rd to 40th place

Source: TS

=== India vs Azerbaijan ===
(110) India vs Azerbaijan (55); Monday, 30 September 2024, 12:00 UTC+8; Nanchang International Sports Center, Court 1
#	Category	India	Score (Partition score)	Azerbaijan
1	MS	Pranay Shettigar (India)	11–0 (11–0)	(Azerbaijan) Ali Gozalov
2	WS	Navya Kanderi (India)	22–9 (11–4)	(Azerbaijan) Hajar Nuriyeva
3	XD	Bhargav Ram Arigela (India); Vennala Kalagotla (India)	33–14 (11–4)	(Azerbaijan) Ulvi Huseynov (Azerbaijan) Hajar Nuriyeva
4	MD	Bhargav Ram Arigela (India); Viswa Tej Gobburu (India)	44–19 (11–4)	(Azerbaijan) Ali Gozalov (Azerbaijan) Ulvi Huseynov
5	WD	Srinidhi Narayanan (India); Reshika Uthayasooriyan (India)	55–30 (11–10)	(Azerbaijan) Leyla Jamalzade (Azerbaijan) Hajar Nuriyeva
6	MS	Dhruv Negi (India)	66–32 (11–2)	(Azerbaijan) Ulvi Huseynov
7	WS	Tanvi Sharma (India)	77–38 (11–6)	(Azerbaijan) Leyla Jamalzade
8	XD	Bhavya Chhabra (India); Shravani Walekar (India)	88–45 (11–7)	(Azerbaijan) Ali Gozalov (Azerbaijan) Leyla Jamalzade
9	MD	Bhavya Chhabra (India); Param Choudhary (India)	99–51 (11–6)	(Azerbaijan) Ali Gozalov (Azerbaijan) Ulvi Huseynov
10	WD	Taarini Suri (India); Shravani Walekar (India)	110–55 (11–4)	(Azerbaijan) Leyla Jamalzade (Azerbaijan) Hajar Nuriyeva
Result

=== Turkey vs Peru ===
(110) Turkey vs Peru (89); Monday, 30 September 2024, 12:00 UTC+8; Nanchang International Sports Center, Court 2
#	Category	Turkey	Score (Partition score)	Peru
1	XD	Buğra Aktaş (Turkey); Sinem Yildiz (Turkey)	11–9 (11–9)	(Peru) Gonzalo Sebastian Castillo Salazar (Peru) Estefania Canchanya
2	WD	Sudenaz Acu (Turkey); Beren Askar (Turkey)	21-22 (11-13)	(Peru) Estefania Canchanya (Peru) Naomi Junco Vasquez
3	WS	Ravza Bodur (Turkey)	29-33 (8-11)	(Peru) Naomi Junco Vasquez
4	MS	Mehmet Can Toremis (Turkey)	42-44 (8-11)	(Peru) Guillermo Buendia Maldonado
5	MD	Buğra Aktaş (Turkey); Mehmet Can Toremis (Turkey)	55–48 (13-4)	(Peru) Gonzalo Sebastian Castillo Salazar (Peru) Maurice Martin Revilla
6	XD	Buğra Aktaş (Turkey); Sinem Yildiz (Turkey)	66–52 (11-4)	(Peru) Gonzalo Sebastian Castillo Salazar (Peru) Estefania Canchanya
7	WD	Sudenaz Acu (Turkey); Beren Askar (Turkey)	77–69 (11-17)	(Peru) Estefania Canchanya (Peru) Naomi Junco Vasquez
8	WS	Ravza Bodur (Turkey)	88-76 (11-7)	(Peru) Naomi Junco Vasquez
9	MS	Mehmet Can Toremis (Turkey)	99-85 (11-9)	(Peru) Guillermo Buendia Maldonado
10	MD	Buğra Aktaş (Turkey); Mehmet Can Toremis (Turkey)	110–89 (11-4)	(Peru) Gonzalo Sebastian Castillo Salazar (Peru) Maurice Martin Revilla
Result

=== Mauritius vs Azerbaijan ===
(110) Mauritius vs Azerbaijan (82); Monday, 30 September 2024, 18:00 UTC+8; Nanchang International Sports Center, Court 3
#	Category	Mauritius	Score (Partition score)	Azerbaijan
1	MS	Lucas Douce (Mauritius)	11-4 (11-4)	(Azerbaijan) Ali Gozalov
2	XD	Aidan Yu Kiat Siow Yin Young (Mauritius); Chiara How Hong (Mauritius)	22-11 (11-6)	(Azerbaijan) Ali Gozalov (Azerbaijan) Leyla Jamalzade
3	WS	Chiara How Hong (Mauritius)	33-22 (11-11)	(Azerbaijan) Hajar Nuriyeva
4	MD	Lucas Douce (Mauritius); Aidan Yu Kiat Siow Yin Young (Mauritius)	44–23 (11-1)	(Azerbaijan) Ali Gozalov (Azerbaijan) Ulvi Huseynov
5	WD	Elsa How Hong (Mauritius); Mia Mi Lin Siow Yin Young (Mauritius)	55–34 (11-11)	(Azerbaijan) Leyla Jamalzade (Azerbaijan) Hajar Nuriyeva
6	MS	Aidan Yu Kiat Siow Yin Young (Mauritius)	66-39 (11-5)	(Azerbaijan) Ulvi Huseynov
7	XD	Lucas Douce (Mauritius); Elsa How Hong (Mauritius)	77–50 (11-11)	(Azerbaijan) Ulvi Huseynov (Azerbaijan) Hajar Nuriyeva
8	WS	Mia Mi Lin Siow Yin Young (Mauritius)	88-63 (11-13)	(Azerbaijan) Leyla Jamalzade
9	MD	Lucas Douce (Mauritius); Aidan Yu Kiat Siow Yin Young (Mauritius)	99–69 (11-6)	(Azerbaijan) Ali Gozalov (Azerbaijan) Ulvi Huseynov
10	WD	Chiara How Hong (Mauritius); Elsa How Hong (Mauritius)	110–82 (11-13)	(Azerbaijan) Leyla Jamalzade (Azerbaijan) Hajar Nuriyeva
Result

=== India vs Peru ===
(110) India vs Peru (50); Monday, 30 September 2024, 18:00 UTC+8; Nanchang International Sports Center, Court 3
#	Category	India	Score (Partition score)	Peru
1	MS	Tushar Suveer (India)	11-1 (11-1)	(Peru) Fabrizio Valdivieso Negri
2	WS	Vennala Kalagotla (India)	22-7 (11-2)	(Peru) Taisia Kasianov Kasianova
3	MD	Bhavya Chhabra (India); Viswa Tej Gobburu (India)	33–14 (11-4)	(Peru) Alejandro Crisanto Toribio (Peru) Fabrizio Gutierrez Quicaño
4	XD	Bhargav Ram Arigela (India); Shravani Walekar (India)	44–17 (11-2)	(Peru) Fabrizio Gutierrez Quicaño (Peru) Valeria Chuquimaqui Curo
5	WD	Taarini Suri (India); Shravani Walekar (India)	55–25 (11-5)	(Peru) Rafaela Castañeda Quintanilla (Peru) Taisia Kasianov Kasianova
6	MS	Numair Shaik (India)	66-27 (11-2)	(Peru) Fabrizio Valdivieso Negri
7	WS	Aalisha Naik (India)	77-38 (11-8)	(Peru) Taisia Kasianov Kasianova
8	MD	Bhargav Ram Arigela (India); Param Choudhary (India)	88–38 (11-0)	(Peru) Alejandro Crisanto Toribio (Peru) Fabrizio Gutierrez Quicaño
9	XD	Bhavya Chhabra (India); Vennala Kalagotla (India)	99–45 (11-5)	(Peru) Fabrizio Gutierrez Quicaño (Peru) Valeria Chuquimaqui Curo
10	WD	Srinidhi Narayanan (India); Reshika Uthayasooriyan (India)	110–50 (11-5)	(Peru) Rafaela Castañeda Quintanilla (Peru) Taisia Kasianov Kasianova
Result

=== Turkey vs Azerbaijan ===
(110) Turkey vs Azerbaijan (60); Tuesday, 1 October 2024, 12:30 UTC+8; Nanchang International Sports Center, Court 5
#	Category	Turkey	Score (Partition score)	Azerbaijan
1	WD	Sudenaz Acu (Turkey); Beren Askar (Turkey)	11–7 (11–7)	(Azerbaijan) Leyla Jamalzade (Azerbaijan) Hajar Nuriyeva
2	MD	Buğra Aktaş (Turkey); Mehmet Can Toremis (Turkey)	22-10 (11-3)	(Azerbaijan) Ali Gozalov (Azerbaijan) Amirkham Imanov
3	WS	Ravza Bodur (Turkey)	33-14 (11-4)	(Azerbaijan) Leyla Jamalzade
4	XD	Buğra Aktaş (Turkey); Sinem Yildiz (Turkey)	44-20 (11-5)	(Azerbaijan) Ali Gozalov (Azerbaijan) Leyla Jamalzade
5	MS	Mehmet Can Toremis (Turkey)	55-31 (11-11)	(Azerbaijan) Ulvi Huseynov
6	WD	Aleyna Korkut (Turkey); Sinem Yildiz (Turkey)	66–36 (11-5)	(Azerbaijan) Leyla Jamalzade (Azerbaijan) Hajar Nuriyeva
7	MD	Buğra Aktaş (Turkey); Mehmet Can Toremis (Turkey)	77–39 (11-3)	(Azerbaijan) Ali Gozalov (Azerbaijan) Ulvi Huseynov
8	WS	Aleyna Korkut (Turkey)	88-48 (11-9)	(Azerbaijan) Hajar Nuriyeva
9	XD	Buğra Aktaş (Turkey); Sinem Yildiz (Turkey)	99-52 (11-4)	(Azerbaijan) Ulvi Huseynov (Azerbaijan) Hajar Nuriyeva
10	MS	Arda Dogac Atan (Turkey)	110-60 (11-8)	(Azerbaijan) Ulvi Huseynov
Result

=== India vs Mauritius ===
(110) India vs Mauritius (49); Tuesday, 1 October 2024, 12:30 UTC+8; Nanchang International Sports Center, Court 6
#	Category	India	Score (Partition score)	Mauritius
1	MS	Pranay Shettigar (India)	11-6 (11-6)	(Mauritius) Lucas Douce
2	WD	Vennala Kalagotla (India); Taarini Suri (India)	22-8 (11-2)	(Mauritius) Chiara How Hong (Mauritius) Elsa How Hong
3	MD	Bhavya Chhabra (India); Tushar Suveer (India)	33-14 (11-4)	(Mauritius) Lucas Douce (Mauritius) Aidan Yu Kiat Siow Yin Young
4	WS	Navya Kanderi (India)	44-22 (11-7)	(Mauritius) Mia Mi Lin Siow Yin Young
5	XD	Bhargav Ram Arigela (India); Vennala Kalagotla (India)	55–25 (11-3)	(Mauritius) Lucas Douce (Mauritius) Elsa How Hong
6	MS	Dhruv Negi (India)	66-27 (11-2)	(Mauritius) Aidan Yu Kiat Siow Yin Young
7	WD	Srinidhi Narayanan (India); Reshika Uthayasooriyan (India)	77–35 (11-3)	(Mauritius) Chiara How Hong (Mauritius) Mia Mi Lin Siow Yin Young
8	MD	Viswa Tej Gobburu (India); Tushar Suveer (India)	88–44 (11-9)	(Mauritius) Lucas Douce (Mauritius) Adian Yu Kiat Siow Yin Young
9	WS	Tanvi Sharma (India)	99-48 (11-4)	(Mauritius) Elsa How Hong
10	XD	Bhargav Ram Arigela (India); Shravani Walekar (India)	110–49 (11-1)	(Mauritius) Adian Yu Kiat Siow Yin Young (Mauritius) Mia Mi Lin Siow Yin Young
Result

=== Peru vs Azerbaijan ===
(110) Peru vs Azerbaijan (97); Wednesday, 2 October 2024, 09:30 UTC+8; Nanchang International Sports Center, Court 7
#	Category	Peru	Score (Partition score)	Azerbaijan
1	MS	Guillermo Buendia Maldonado (Peru)	6-11 (6-11)	(Azerbaijan) Ulvi Huseynov
2	WD	Estefania Canchanya (Peru); Naomi Junco Vasquez (Peru)	12-22 (6-11)	(Azerbaijan) Leyla Jamalzade (Azerbaijan) Hajar Nuriyeva
3	WS	Naomi Junco Vasquez (Peru)	33-30 (21-8)	(Azerbaijan) Hajar Nuriyeva
4	XD	Gonzalo Sebastian Castillo Salazar (Peru); Estefania Canchanya (Peru)	41-44 (8-14)	(Azerbaijan) Ulvi Huseynov (Azerbaijan) Hajar Nuriyeva
5	MD	Gonzalo Sebastian Castillo Salazar (Peru); Fabrizio Valdivieso Negri (Peru)	50-55 (9-11)	(Azerbaijan) Ulvi Huseynov (Azerbaijan) Amirkhan Imanov
6	MS	Guillermo Buendia Maldonado (Peru)	60-66 (10-11)	(Azerbaijan) Amirkhan Imanov
7	WD	Rafaela Castañeda Quintanilla (Peru); Naomi Junco Vasquez (Peru)	70-77 (10-11)	(Azerbaijan) Leyla Jamalzade (Azerbaijan) Hajar Nuriyeva
8	WS	Naomi Junco Vasquez (Peru)	88-81 (18-4)	(Azerbaijan) Leyla Jamalzade
9	XD	Gonzalo Sebastian Castillo Salazar (Peru); Estefania Canchanya (Peru)	99–85 (11-4)	(Azerbaijan) Amirkhan Imanov (Azerbaijan) Leyla Jamalzade
10	MD	Guillermo Buendia Maldonado (Peru); Fabrizio Valdivieso Negri (Peru)	110–97 (11-12)	(Azerbaijan) Ulvi Huseynov (Azerbaijan) Amirkhan Imanov
Result

=== Turkey vs Mauritius ===
(110) Turkey vs Mauritius (62); Tuesday, 2 October 2024, 09:30 UTC+8; Nanchang International Sports Center, Court 8
#	Category	Turkey	Score (Partition score)	Mauritius
1	WD	Aleyna Korkut (Turkey); Sinem Yildiz (Turkey)	11–4 (11–4)	(Mauritius) Elsa How Hong (Mauritius) Mia Mi Lin Siow Yin Young
2	XD	Buğra Aktaş (Turkey); Sinem Yildiz (Turkey)	22–7 (11–2)	(Mauritius) Lucas Douce (Mauritius) Elsa How Hong
3	WS	Ravza Bodur (Turkey)	33–14 (11–4)	(Mauritius) Mia Mi Lin Siow Yin Young
4	MS	Mehmet Can Toremis (Turkey)	44–28 (11-13)	(Mauritius) Lucas Douce
5	MD	Buğra Aktaş (Turkey); Mehmet Can Toremis (Turkey)	55–33 (11–5)	(Mauritius) Lucas Douce (Mauritius) Aidan Yu Kiat Siow Yin Young
6	WD	Sudenaz Acu (Turkey); Beren Askar (Turkey)	66–39 (11–6)	(Mauritius) Chiara How Hong (Mauritius) Elsa How Hong
7	XD	Buğra Aktaş (Turkey); Sinem Yildiz (Turkey)	77–41 (11–2)	(Mauritius) Aidan Yu Kiat Siow Yin Young (Mauritius) Chiara How Hong
8	WS	Ravza Bodur (Turkey)	88–49 (11–8)	(Mauritius) Elsa How Hong
9	MS	Mehmet Can Toremis (Turkey)	99–56 (11–7)	(Mauritius) Aidan Yu Kiat Siow Yin Young
10	MD	Buğra Aktaş (Turkey); Mehmet Can Toremis (Turkey)	110–62 (11–6)	(Mauritius) Lucas Douce (Mauritius) Aidan Yu Kiat Siow Yin Young
Result

=== Peru vs Mauritius ===
(110) Peru vs Mauritius (81); Tuesday, 2 October 2024, 15:30 UTC+8; Nanchang International Sports Center, Court 1
#	Category	Peru	Score (Partition score)	Mauritius
1	MD	Guillermo Buendia Maldonado (Peru); Gonzalo Sebastian Castillo Salazar (Peru)	11–10 (11–10)	(Mauritius) Lucas Douce (Mauritius) Aidan Yu Kiat Siow Yin Young
2	WD	Rafaela Castañeda Quintanilla (Peru); Naomi Junco Vasquez (Peru)	22–16 (11–6)	(Mauritius) Chiara How Hong (Mauritius) Elsa How Hong
3	MS	Guillermo Buendia Maldonado (Peru)	33–28 (11-12)	(Mauritius) Lucas Douce
4	XD	Gonzalo Sebastian Castillo Salazar (Peru); Estefania Canchanya (Peru)	40-44 (7-16)	(Mauritius) Lucas Douce (Mauritius) Elsa How Hong
5	WS	Naomi Junco Vasquez (Peru)	55-54 (15-11)	(Mauritius) Elsa How Hong
6	MD	Gonzalo Sebastian Castillo Salazar (Peru); Fabrizio Valdivieso Negri (Peru)	66–62 (11–8)	(Mauritius) Lucas Douce (Mauritius) Aidan Yu Kiat Siow Yin Young
7	WD	Estefania Canchanya (Peru); Naomi Junco Vasquez (Peru)	77–65 (11–3)	(Mauritius) Elsa How Hong (Mauritius) Mia Mi Lin Siow Yin Young
8	MS	Guillermo Buendia Maldonado (Peru)	88–71 (11–6)	(Mauritius) Aidan Yu Kiat Siow Yin Young
9	XD	Gonzalo Sebastian Castillo Salazar (Peru); Estefania Canchanya (Peru)	99-74 (11-3)	(Mauritius) Aidan Yu Kiat Siow Yin Young (Mauritius) Mia Mi Lin Siow Yin Young
10	WS	Naomi Junco Vasquez (Peru)	110–81 (11–7)	(Mauritius) Mia Mi Lin Siow Yin Young
Result

=== India vs Turkey ===
(110) India vs Turkey (99); Tuesday, 2 October 2024, 15:30 UTC+8; Nanchang International Sports Center, Court 2
#	Category	India	Score (Partition score)	Turkey
1	MS	Tushar Suveer (India)	7-11 (7-11)	(Turkey) Mehmet Can Toremis
2	WD	Srinidhi Narayanan (India); Reshika Uthayasooriyan (India)	22–18 (15-7)	(Turkey) Sudenaz Acu (Turkey) Beren Askar
3	WS	Navya Kanderi (India)	33–29 (11-11)	(Turkey) Ravza Bodur
4	MD	Bhavya Chhabra (India); Param Choudhary (India)	44-35 (11-6)	(Turkey) Buğra Aktaş (Turkey) Mehmet Can Toremis
5	XD	Bhargav Ram Arigela (India); Vennala Kalagotla (India)	55-49 (11-14)	(Turkey) Buğra Aktaş (Turkey) Sinem Yildiz
6	MS	Numair Shaik (India)	66-63 (11-14)	(Turkey) Mehmet Can Toremis
7	WD	Taarini Suri (India); Shravani Walekar (India)	77–68 (11–5)	(Turkey) Aleyna Korkut (Turkey) Sinem Yildiz
8	WS	Tanvi Sharma (India)	88–74 (11–6)	(Turkey) Ravza Bodur
9	MD	Bhargav Ram Arigela (India); Viswa Tej Gobburu (India)	99-82 (11-8)	(Turkey) Buğra Aktaş (Turkey) Mehmet Can Toremis
10	XD	Bhavya Chhabra (India); Shravani Walekar (India)	110-99 (11-17)	(Turkey) Buğra Aktaş (Turkey) Sinem Yildiz
Result

== Group F ==
Pos	Team	Pld	W	L	MF	MA	MD	GF	GA	GD	PF	PA	PD	Pts	Qualification
1	Indonesia [3/4]	4	4	0	440	230	+210	40	0	+40	2420	1243	+1177	4	Qualified to knockout stage 1st to 8th
2	Poland [9/16]	4	3	1	393	345	+48	24	16	+8	2148	1931	+217	3	Qualified to knockout stage 9th to 16th place
3	Sri Lanka [17/40]	4	2	2	386	328	+58	22	18	+4	2104	1841	+263	2	Qualified to knockout stage 17th to 24th place
4	Macau [17/40]	4	1	3	314	379	−65	14	26	−12	1812	2072	−260	1	Qualified to knockout stage 25th to 32nd place
5	Northern Mariana Islands [17/40]	4	0	4	189	440	−251	0	40	−40	1023	2420	−1397	0	Qualified to knockout stage 33rd to 40th place

Source: TS

=== Poland vs Northern Mariana Islands ===
(110) Poland vs Northern Mariana Islands (48); Monday, 30 September 2024, 12:00 UTC+8; Nanchang International Sports Center, Court 3
#	Category	Poland	Score (Partition score)	Northern Mariana Islands
1	WS	Kaja Ziółkowska (Poland)	11–0 (11–0)	(Northern Mariana Islands) Lina Tsukagoshi
2	XD	Mikołaj Morawski (Poland); Maja Janko (Poland)	22–7 (11–2)	(Northern Mariana Islands) Dave Bryan Olpindo Odicta (Northern Mariana Islands) Shaina Angela Dael Malonzo
3	MS	Bartosz Puńko (Poland)	33–12 (11–2)	(Northern Mariana Islands) Sean Paul Cortuna Dizon
4	WD	Maja Janko (Poland); Kinga Stokfisz (Poland)	44–17 (11–2)	(Northern Mariana Islands) Shaina Angela Dael Malonzo (Northern Mariana Islands) Lina Tsukagoshi
5	MD	Mikołaj Morawski (Poland); Krzysztof Podkowiński (Poland)	55–23 (11–3)	(Northern Mariana Islands) Marlon Bautista (Northern Mariana Islands) Dave Bryan Olpindo Odicta
6	WS	Alicja Syrek (Poland)	66–28 (11–3)	(Northern Mariana Islands) Genelyn Joy Mirando Lansangan
7	XD	Krzysztof Podkowiński (Poland); Kinga Stokfisz (Poland)	77–34 (11–4)	(Northern Mariana Islands) Jude Dominguez Mallari (Northern Mariana Islands) Ruth Charmaine Corpuz Bautista
8	MS	Mateusz Golas (Poland)	88–38 (11–3)	(Northern Mariana Islands) Marlon Bautista
9	WD	Maja Janko (Poland); Kinga Stokfisz (Poland)	99–44 (11–4)	(Northern Mariana Islands) Ruth Charmaine Corpuz Bautista (Northern Mariana Islands) Genelyn Joy Mirando Lansangan
10	MD	Mikołaj Morawski (Poland); Krzysztof Podkowiński (Poland)	110–48 (11–3)	(Northern Mariana Islands) Sean Paul Cortuna Dizon (Northern Mariana Islands) Jude Dominguez Mallari
Result

=== Indonesia vs Macau ===
(110) Indonesia vs Macau (58); Monday, 30 September 2024, 12:00 UTC+8; Nanchang International Sports Center, Court 4
#	Category	Indonesia	Score (Partition score)	Macau
1	MS	Zaki Ubaidillah (Indonesia)	11–3 (11–3)	(Macau) Tong Chon In
2	MD	Anselmus Prasetya (Indonesia); Pulung Ramadhan (Indonesia)	22–6 (11–1)	(Macau) Chang Chi Chon (Macau) Chio Chi Seng
3	WS	Mutiara Ayu Puspitasari (Indonesia)	33–17 (11–7)	(Macau) Chan Hao Wai
4	WD	Isyana Syahira Meida (Indonesia); Rinjani Kwinara Nastine (Indonesia)	44–22 (11–5)	(Macau) Ieong Sam Kio (Macau) Wang Wai Kei
5	XD	Taufik Aderya (Indonesia); Clairine Yustin Mulia (Indonesia)	55–28 (11–6)	(Macau) Kou Sin Iong (Macau) Wong Lei Ian
6	MS	Richie Duta Richardo (Indonesia)	66–36 (11–8)	(Macau) Tong Chon In
7	MD	Dexter Farrell (Indonesia); Wahyu Agung Prasetyo (Indonesia)	77–41 (11–5)	(Macau) Chang Chi Chon (Macau) Ou Ka Hou
8	WS	Ni Kadek Dhinda Amartya Pratiwi (Indonesia)	88–49 (11–8)	(Macau) Chan Hao Wai
9	WD	Riska Anggraini (Indonesia); Salsabila Zahra Aulia (Indonesia)	99–54 (11–5)	(Macau) Ung Cheok Ian (Macau) Wang Wai Kei
10	XD	Darren Aurelius (Indonesia); Bernadine Anindya Wardana (Indonesia)	110–58 (11–4)	(Macau) Kou Sin Iong (Macau) Wong Lei Ian
Result

=== Sri Lanka vs Macau ===
(110) Sri Lanka vs Macau (63); Monday, 30 September 2024, 18:00 UTC+8; Nanchang International Sports Center, Court 5
#	Category	Sri Lanka	Score (Partition score)	Macau
1	MS	Thilina Rajakurana (Sri Lanka)	10–11 (10–11)	(Macau) Tong Chon In
2	WD	Varangana Jayawardana (Sri Lanka); Rashmi Mudalige (Sri Lanka)	21–22 (11–11)	(Macau) Wang Wai Kei (Macau) Wong Lei Ian
3	WS	Ranithma Liyanage (Sri Lanka)	33–25 (12–3)	(Macau) Chan Hao Wai
4	MD	Shenuk Samararatne (Sri Lanka); Thidasa Weragoda (Sri Lanka)	44–31 (11–6)	(Macau) Kou Sin Iong (Macau) Ou Ka Hou
5	XD	Shenuk Samararatne (Sri Lanka); Ranithma Liyanage (Sri Lanka)	55–33 (11–2)	(Macau) Kou Sin Iong (Macau) Wong Lei Ian
6	MS	Thilina Rajakaruna (Sri Lanka)	66–42 (11–9)	(Macau) Tong Chon In
7	WD	Varangana Jayawardana (Sri Lanka); Rashmi Mudalige (Sri Lanka)	77–51 (11–9)	(Macau) Wang Wai Kei (Macau) Wong Lei Ian
8	WS	Ranithma Liyanage (Sri Lanka)	88–55 (11–4)	(Macau) Chan Hao Wai
9	MD	Shenuk Samararatne (Sri Lanka); Thidasa Weragoda (Sri Lanka)	99–61 (11–6)	(Macau) Kou Sin Iong (Macau) Ou Ka Hou
10	XD	Shenuk Samararatne (Sri Lanka); Ranithma Liyanage (Sri Lanka)	110–63 (11–2)	(Macau) Tong Chon In (Macau) Wang Wai Kei
Result

=== Indonesia vs Northern Mariana Islands ===
(110) Indonesia vs Northern Mariana Islands (47); Monday, 30 September 2024, 18:00 UTC+8; Nanchang International Sports Center, Court 5
#	Category	Indonesia	Score (Partition score)	Northern Mariana Islands
1	MS	Bismo Raya Oktora (Indonesia)	11–1 (11–1)	(Northern Mariana Islands) Marlon Bautista
2	WD	Isyana Syahira Meida (Indonesia); Rinjani Kwinara Nastine (Indonesia)	22–6 (11–1)	(Northern Mariana Islands) Shaina Angela Dael Malonzo (Northern Mariana Islands) Lina Tsukagoshi
3	WS	Sausan Dwi Ramadhani (Indonesia)	33–12 (11–2)	(Northern Mariana Islands) Lina Tsukagoshi
4	XD	Taufik Aderya (Indonesia); Clairine Yustin Mulia (Indonesia)	44–17 (11–2)	(Northern Mariana Islands) Jude Dominguez Mallari (Northern Mariana Islands) Ruth Charmaine Corpuz Bautista
5	MD	Anselmus Prasetya (Indonesia); Pulung Ramadhan (Indonesia)	55–21 (11–1)	(Northern Mariana Islands) Marlon Bautista (Northern Mariana Islands) Dave Bryan Olpindo Odicta
6	MS	Hendry Leander (Indonesia)	66–27 (11–2)	(Northern Mariana Islands) Sean Paul Cortuna Dizon
7	WD	Riska Anggraini (Indonesia); Salsabila Zahra Aulia (Indonesia)	77–34 (11–4)	(Northern Mariana Islands) Ruth Charmaine Corpuz Bautista (Northern Mariana Islands) Genelyn Joy Mirando Lansangan
8	WS	Kavitha Nadjwa Aulia (Indonesia)	88–36 (11–1)	(Northern Mariana Islands) Genelyn Joy Mirando Lansangan
9	XD	Darren Aurelius (Indonesia); Bernadine Anindya Wardana (Indonesia)	99–42 (11–2)	(Northern Mariana Islands) Dave Bryan Olpindo Odicta (Northern Mariana Islands) Shaina Angela Dael Malonzo
10	MD	Dexter Farrell (Indonesia); Wahyu Agung Prasetyo (Indonesia)	110–47 (11–2)	(Northern Mariana Islands) Sean Paul Cortuna Dizon (Northern Mariana Islands) Jude Dominguez Mallari
Result

=== Indonesia vs Sri Lanka ===
(110) Indonesia vs Sri Lanka (62); Tuesday, 1 October 2024, 12:30 UTC+8; Nanchang International Sports Center, Court 7
#	Category	Indonesia	Score (Partition score)	Sri Lanka
1	MS	Zaki Ubaidillah (Indonesia)	11–5 (11–5)	(Sri Lanka) Thilina Rajakaruna
2	WD	Isyana Syahira Meida (Indonesia); Rinjani Kwinara Nastine (Indonesia)	22–10 (11–5)	(Sri Lanka) Varangana Jayawardana (Sri Lanka) Rashmi Mudalige
3	WS	Mutiara Ayu Puspitasari (Indonesia)	33–14 (11–4)	(Sri Lanka) Ranithma Liyanage
4	XD	Taufik Aderya (Indonesia); Clairine Yustin Mulia (Indonesia)	44–19 (11–4)	(Sri Lanka) Shenuk Samararatne (Sri Lanka) Ranithma Liyanage
5	MD	Dexter Farrell (Indonesia); Wahyu Agung Prasetyo (Indonesia)	55–28 (11–8)	(Sri Lanka) Shenuk Samararatne (Sri Lanka) Thidasa Weragoda
6	MS	Richie Duta Richardo (Indonesia)	66–38 (11–10)	(Sri Lanka) Thilina Rajakaruna
7	WD	Riska Anggraini (Indonesia); Salsabila Zahra Aulia (Indonesia)	77–43 (11–5)	(Sri Lanka) Varangana Jayawardana (Sri Lanka) Rashmi Mudalige
8	WS	Ni Kadek Dhinda Amartya Pratiwi (Indonesia)	88–48 (11–5)	(Sri Lanka) Ranithma Liyanage
9	XD	Darren Aurelius (Indonesia); Bernadine Anindya Wardana (Indonesia)	99–53 (11–5)	(Sri Lanka) Shenuk Samararatne (Sri Lanka) Ranithma Liyanage
10	MD	Anselmus Prasetya (Indonesia); Pulung Ramadhan (Indonesia)	110–62 (11–9)	(Sri Lanka) Shenuk Samararatne (Sri Lanka) Thidasa Weragoda
Result

=== Poland vs Macau ===
(110) Poland vs Macau (83); Tuesday, 1 October 2024, 12:30 UTC+8; Nanchang International Sports Center, Court 8
#	Category	Poland	Score (Partition score)	Macau
1	MD	Mikołaj Morawski (Poland); Krzysztof Podkowiński (Poland)	11–6 (11–6)	(Macau) Chang Chi Chon (Macau) Ou Ka Hou
2	WS	Kaja Ziółkowska (Poland)	20–22 (9–16)	(Macau) Chan Hao Wai
3	WD	Maja Janko (Poland); Kinga Stokfisz (Poland)	32–33 (12–11)	(Macau) Ieong Sam Kio (Macau) Wang Wai Kei
4	XD	Mikołaj Morawski (Poland); Maja Janko (Poland)	44–39 (12–6)	(Macau) Kou Sin Iong (Macau) Wong Lei Ian
5	MS	Mateusz Golas (Poland)	55–46 (11–7)	(Macau) Tong Chon In
6	MD	Mikołaj Morawski (Poland); Krzysztof Podkowiński (Poland)	66–55 (11–9)	(Macau) Chio Chi Seng (Macau) Ou Ka Hou
7	WS	Alicja Syrek (Poland)	77–67 (11–12)	(Macau) Ieong Sam Kio
8	WD	Maja Janko (Poland); Kinga Stokfisz (Poland)	88–72 (11–5)	(Macau) Chan Hao Wai (Macau) Ung Cheok Ian
9	XD	Krzysztof Podkowiński (Poland); Kinga Stokfisz (Poland)	99–76 (11–4)	(Macau) Kou Sin Iong (Macau) Wong Lei Ian
10	MS	Bartosz Puńko (Poland)	110–83 (11–7)	(Macau) Tong Chon In
Result

=== Poland vs Sri Lanka ===
(110) Poland vs Sri Lanka (104); Wednesday, 2 October 2024, 09:30 UTC+8; Nanchang International Sports Center, Court 1
#	Category	Poland	Score (Partition score)	Sri Lanka
1	MD	Mikołaj Morawski (Poland); Krzysztof Podkowiński (Poland)	11–5 (11–5)	(Sri Lanka) Shenuk Samararatne (Sri Lanka) Thidasa Weragoda
2	WD	Maja Janko (Poland); Kinga Stokfisz (Poland)	22–9 (11–4)	(Sri Lanka) Varangana Jayawardana (Sri Lanka) Rashmi Mudalige
3	WS	Maja Janko (Poland)	24–33 (2–23)	(Sri Lanka) Ranithma Liyanage
4	MS	Mateusz Golas (Poland)	36–44 (12–11)	(Sri Lanka) Thilina Rajakaruna
5	XD	Krzysztof Podkowiński (Poland); Kinga Stokfisz (Poland)	55–54 (19–10)	(Sri Lanka) Shenuk Samararatne (Sri Lanka) Ranithma Liyanage
6	MD	Mikołaj Morawski (Poland); Krzysztof Podkowiński (Poland)	66–65 (11–11)	(Sri Lanka) Shenuk Samararatne (Sri Lanka) Thidasa Weragoda
7	WD	Maja Janko (Poland); Kinga Stokfisz (Poland)	76–77 (10–12)	(Sri Lanka) Varangana Jayawardana (Sri Lanka) Rashmi Mudalige
8	WS	Kinga Stokfisz (Poland)	76–88 (0–11)	(Sri Lanka) Ranithma Liyanage
9	MS	Mateusz Golas (Poland)	99–97 (23–9)	(Sri Lanka) Thilina Rajakaruna
10	XD	Mikołaj Morawski (Poland); Maja Janko (Poland)	110–104 (11–7)	(Sri Lanka) Shenuk Samararatne (Sri Lanka) Ranithma Liyanage
Result

=== Macau vs Northern Mariana Islands ===
(110) Macau vs Northern Mariana Islands (49); Wednesday, 2 October 2024, 09:30 UTC+8; Nanchang International Sports Center, Court 2
#	Category	Macau	Score (Partition score)	Northern Mariana Islands
1	WD	Ieong Sam Kio (Macau); Wang Wai Kei (Macau)	11-1 (11-1)	(Northern Mariana Islands) Genelyn Joy Mirando Lansangan (Northern Mariana Islands) Lina Tsukagoshi
2	MS	Tong Chon In (Macau)	22-9 (11-4)	(Northern Mariana Islands) Marlon Bautista
3	XD	Tong Chon In (Macau); Wang Wai Kei (Macau)	33-11 (11-1)	(Northern Mariana Islands) Jude Dominguez Mallari (Northern Mariana Islands) Ruth Charmaine Corpuz Bautista
4	MD	Chang Chi Chon (Macau); Kou Sin Iong (Macau)	44-21 (11-6)	(Northern Mariana Islands) Marlon Bautista (Northern Mariana Islands) Dave Bryan Olpindo Odicta
5	WS	Chan Hao Wai (Macau)	55-24 (11-3)	(Northern Mariana Islands) Lina Tsukagoshi
6	WD	Ieong Sam Kio (Macau); Wang Wai Kei (Macau)	66-28 (11-3)	(Northern Mariana Islands) Genelyn Joy Mirando Lansangan (Northern Mariana Islands) Shaina Angela Dael Malonzo
7	MS	Tong Chon In (Macau)	77-34 (11-4)	(Northern Mariana Islands) Sean Paul Cortuna Dizon
8	XD	Tong Chon In (Macau); Wang Wai Kei (Macau)	88-37 (11-3)	(Northern Mariana Islands) Dave Bryan Olpindo Odicta (Northern Mariana Islands) Shaina Angela Dael Malonzo
9	MD	Chang Chi Chon (Macau); Kou Sin Iong (Macau)	99-48 (11-8)	(Northern Mariana Islands) Sean Paul Cortuna Dizon (Northern Mariana Islands) Jude Dominguez Mallari
10	WS	Chan Hao Wai (Macau)	110-49 (11-1)	(Northern Mariana Islands) Ruth Charmaine Corpuz Bautista
Result

=== Indonesia vs Poland ===
(110) Indonesia vs Poland (63); Wednesday, 2 October 2024, 15:30 UTC+8; Nanchang International Sports Center, Court 4
#	Category	Indonesia	Score (Partition score)	Poland
1	MS	Bismo Raya Oktora (Indonesia)	11–9 (11–9)	(Poland) Mateusz Golas
2	MD	Dexter Farrell (Indonesia); Wahyu Agung Prasetyo (Indonesia)	22–15 (11–6)	(Poland) Mikołaj Morawski (Poland) Krzysztof Podkowiński
3	WS	Mutiara Ayu Puspitasari (Indonesia)	33–18 (11–3)	(Poland) Kaja Ziółkowska
4	WD	Riska Anggraini (Indonesia); Salsabila Zahra Aulia (Indonesia)	44–31 (11–13)	(Poland) Maja Janko (Poland) Kinga Stokfisz
5	XD	Taufik Aderya (Indonesia); Clairine Yustin Mulia (Indonesia)	55–35 (11–4)	(Poland) Krzysztof Podkowiński (Poland) Kinga Stokfisz
6	MS	Hendry Leander (Indonesia)	66–40 (11–5)	(Poland) Bartosz Puńko
7	MD	Anselmus Prasetya (Indonesia); Pulung Ramadhan (Indonesia)	77–47 (11–7)	(Poland) Mikołaj Morawski (Poland) Krzysztof Podkowiński
8	WS	Ni Kadek Dhinda Amartya Pratiwi (Indonesia)	88–52 (11–5)	(Poland) Alicja Syrek
9	WD	Isyana Syahira Meida (Indonesia); Rinjani Kwinara Nastine (Indonesia)	99–56 (11–4)	(Poland) Maja Janko (Poland) Kinga Stokfisz
10	XD	Darren Aurelius (Indonesia); Bernadine Anindya Wardana (Indonesia)	110–63 (11–7)	(Poland) Mikołaj Morawski (Poland) Maja Janko
Result

=== Sri Lanka vs Northern Mariana Islands ===
(110) Sri Lanka vs Northern Mariana Islands (45); Wednesday, 2 October 2024, 15:30 UTC+8; Nanchang International Sports Center, Court 3
#	Category	Sri Lanka	Score (Partition score)	Northern Mariana Islands
1	XD	Shenuk Samararatne (Sri Lanka); Ranithma Liyanage (Sri Lanka)	11-2 (11-2)	(Northern Mariana Islands) Dave Bryan Olpindo Odicta (Northern Mariana Islands) Shaina Angela Dael Malonzo
2	MS	Thilina Rajakaruna (Sri Lanka)	22-9 (11-4)	(Northern Mariana Islands) Marlon Bautista
3	WD	Varangana Jayawardana (Sri Lanka); Rashmi Mudalige (Sri Lanka)	33-15 (11-5)	(Northern Mariana Islands) Shaina Angela Dael Malonzo (Northern Mariana Islands) Lina Tsukagoshi
4	MD	Shenuk Samararatne (Sri Lanka); Thidasa Weragoda (Sri Lanka)	44-21 (11-6)	(Northern Mariana Islands) Marlon Bautista (Northern Mariana Islands) Dave Bryan Olpindo Odicta
5	WS	Ranithma Liyanage (Sri Lanka)	55-27 (11-6)	(Northern Mariana Islands) Lina Tsukagoshi
6	XD	Shenuk Samararatne (Sri Lanka); Ranithma Liyanage (Sri Lanka)	66-31 (11-4)	(Northern Mariana Islands) Dave Bryan Olpindo Odicta (Northern Mariana Islands) Shaina Angela Dael Malonzo
7	MS	Thilina Rajakaruna (Sri Lanka)	77-36 (11-5)	(Northern Mariana Islands) Marlon Bautista
8	WD	Varangana Jayawardana (Sri Lanka); Rashmi Mudalige (Sri Lanka)	88-37 (11-1)	(Northern Mariana Islands) Shaina Angela Dael Malonzo (Northern Mariana Islands) Lina Tsukagoshi
9	MD	Shenuk Samararatne (Sri Lanka); Thidasa Weragoda (Sri Lanka)	99-44 (11-4)	(Northern Mariana Islands) Marlon Bautista (Northern Mariana Islands) Dave Bryan Olpindo Odicta
10	WS	Ranithma Liyanage (Sri Lanka)	110-45 (11-0)	(Northern Mariana Islands) Lina Tsukagoshi
Result

== Group G ==
Pos	Team	Pld	W	L	MF	MA	MD	GF	GA	GD	PF	PA	PD	Pts	Qualification
1	Japan [5/8]	4	4	0	440	207	+233	40	0	+40	2420	1083	+1337	4	Qualified to knockout stage 1st to 8th
2	England [17/40]	4	3	1	394	316	+78	26	14	+12	2124	1722	+402	3	Qualified to knockout stage 9th to 16th place
3	Slovenia [9/16]	4	2	2	372	356	+16	24	16	+8	2045	1905	+140	2	Qualified to knockout stage 17th to 24th place
4	Latvia [17/40]	4	1	3	283	413	−130	10	30	−20	1541	2204	−663	1	Qualified to knockout stage 25th to 32nd place
5	Uganda [17/40]	4	0	4	243	440	−197	0	40	−40	1204	2420	−1216	0	Qualified to knockout stage 33rd to 40th place

Source: TS

=== Japan vs Latvia ===
(110) Japan vs Latvia (48); Monday, 30 September 2024, 12:00 UTC+8; Nanchang International Sports Center, Court 5
#	Category	Japan	Score (Partition score)	Latvia
1	WS	Niina Matsuta (Japan)	11–2 (11–2)	(Latvia) Anete Priedniece
2	MS	Rui Yamada (Japan)	22–6 (11–1)	(Latvia) Regnārs Bajārs
3	WD	Ririna Hiramoto (Japan); Aya Tamaki (Japan)	33–10 (11–0)	(Latvia) Madara Mackēviča (Latvia) Anete Priedniece
4	MD	Renjiro Inagawa (Japan); Daichi Miura (Japan)	44–19 (11–4)	(Latvia) Regnārs Bajārs (Latvia) Toms Sala
5	XD	Kenta Matsukawa (Japan); Ririna Hiramoto (Japan)	55–23 (11–3)	(Latvia) Andrejs Vilnis (Latvia) Evelina Freija
6	WS	Nayu Shirakawa (Japan)	66–28 (11–3)	(Latvia) Madara Mackēviča
7	MS	Toshiki Nishio (Japan)	77–31 (11–1)	(Latvia) Rūdolfs Andersons
8	WD	Mikoto Aiso (Japan); Rin Ueno (Japan)	88–35 (11–0)	(Latvia) Evelīna Freija (Latvia) Nikola Mukiele
9	MD	Shuji Sawada (Japan); Masato Yamashiro (Japan)	99–43 (11–3)	(Latvia) Rūdolfs Andersons (Latvia) Andrejs Vilnis
10	XD	Rui Yamada (Japan); Mikoto Aiso (Japan)	110–48 (11–3)	(Latvia) Toms Sala (Latvia) Nikola Mukiele
Result

=== Slovenia vs Uganda ===
(110) Slovenia vs Uganda (58); Monday, 30 September 2024, 12:00 UTC+8; Nanchang International Sports Center, Court 6
#	Category	Slovenia	Score (Partition score)	Uganda
1	MS	Nikita Peshekhonov (Slovenia)	11–4 (11–4)	(Uganda) Arafat Tendo Kibirige
2	MD	Tadej Jelenc (Slovenia); Nikita Peshekhonov (Slovenia)	22–11 (11–6)	(Uganda) Aaron Ndawula (Uganda) Eric Ofoyuru
3	XD	Nikita Peshekhonov (Slovenia); Tija Horvat (Slovenia)	33–11 (11–0)	(Uganda) Aaron Ndawula (Uganda) Nazifa Nakiyemba
4	WS	Tinkara Alič (Slovenia)	44–24 (11–9)	(Uganda) Olivia Betty Kyomukama
5	WD	Anja Blazina (Slovenia); Ariana Korent (Slovenia)	55–26 (11–2)	(Uganda) Ramiah Bukenya (Uganda) Nazifa Nakiyemba
6	MS	Tadej Jelenc (Slovenia)	66–31 (11–5)	(Uganda) Eric Ofoyuru
7	MD	Tadej Jelenc (Slovenia); Nikita Peshekhonov (Slovenia)	77–34 (11–3)	(Uganda) Arafat Tendo Kibirige (Uganda) Eric Ofoyuru
8	XD	Tadej Jelenc (Slovenia); Ariana Korent (Slovenia)	88–42 (11–7)	(Uganda) Arafat Tendo Kibirige (Uganda) Olivia Betty Kyomukama
9	WS	Anja Blazina (Slovenia)	99–42 (11–0)	(Uganda) Ramiah Bukenya
10	WD	Tinkara Alič (Slovenia); Tija Horvat (Slovenia)	110–58 (11–13)	(Uganda) Olivia Betty Kyomukama (Uganda) Nazifa Nakiyemba
Result

=== Japan vs Uganda ===
(110) Japan vs Uganda (48); Monday, 30 September 2024, 18:00 UTC+8; Nanchang International Sports Center, Court 7
#	Category	Japan	Score (Partition score)	Uganda
1	XD	Masato Yamashiro (Japan); Sora Hatakeyama (Japan)	11–5 (11–5)	(Uganda) Eric Ofoyuru (Uganda) Olivia Betty Kyomukama
2	WS	Meisa Anami (Japan)	22–5 (11–0)	(Uganda) Nazifa Nakiyemba
3	MS	Hyuga Takano (Japan)	33–10 (11–0)	(Uganda) Aaron Ndawula
4	WD	Mikoto Aiso (Japan); Rin Ueno (Japan)	44–17 (11–2)	(Uganda) Olivia Betty Kyomukama (Uganda) Nazifa Nakiyemba
5	MD	Kenta Matsukawa (Japan); Yuto Nakashizu (Japan)	55–23 (11–3)	(Uganda) Arafat Tendo Kibirige (Uganda) Eric Ofoyuru
6	XD	Shuji Sawada (Japan); Aya Tamaki (Japan)	66–28 (11–3)	(Uganda) Arafat Tendo Kibirige (Uganda) Olivia Betty Kyomukama
7	WS	Mion Yokouchi (Japan)	77–30 (11–0)	(Uganda) Ramiah Bukenya
8	MS	Toshiki Nishio (Japan)	88–37 (11–2)	(Uganda) Arafat Tendo Kibirige
9	WD	Sora Hatakeyama (Japan); Akari Kamio (Japan)	99–43 (11–3)	(Uganda) Ramiah Bukenya (Uganda) Nazifa Nakiyemba
10	MD	Renjiro Inagawa (Japan); Daichi Miura (Japan)	110–48 (11–3)	(Uganda) Aaron Ndawula (Uganda) Eric Ofoyuru
Result

=== England vs Latvia ===
(110) England vs Latvia (47); Monday, 30 September 2024, 18:00 UTC+8; Nanchang International Sports Center, Court 8
#	Category	England	Score (Partition score)	Latvia
1	WD	Lucy Brierley (England); Lila Dundas (England)	11–5 (11–5)	(Latvia) Evelīna Freija (Latvia) Nikola Mukiele
2	WS	Rajvi Parab (England)	22–6 (11–1)	(Latvia) Evelīna Freija
3	MD	Benjamin Horseman (England); Jia Bin Lee (England)	33–12 (11–2)	(Latvia) Rūdolfs Andersons (Latvia) Andrejs Vilnis
4	XD	Benjamin Horseman (England); Lucy Brierley (England)	44–16 (11–1)	(Latvia) Regnārs Bajārs (Latvia) Anete Priedniece
5	MS	Jason Ou (England)	55–25 (11–5)	(Latvia) Toms Sala
6	WD	Lucy Brierley (England); Lila Dundas (England)	66–30 (11–5)	(Latvia) Madara Mackēviča (Latvia) Anete Priedniece
7	WS	Rajvi Parab (England)	77–31 (11–1)	(Latvia) Nikola Mukiele
8	MD	Benjamin Horseman (England); Jia Bin Lee (England)	88–43 (11–8)	(Latvia) Regnārs Bajārs (Latvia) Toms Sala
9	XD	Benjamin Horseman (England); Lucy Brierley (England)	99–45 (11–2)	(Latvia) Rūdolfs Andersons (Latvia) Madara Mackēviča
10	MS	Jason Ou (England)	110–47 (11–2)	(Latvia) Andrejs Vilnis
Result

=== Slovenia vs Latvia ===
(110) Slovenia vs Latvia (78); Tuesday, 1 October 2024, 12:30 UTC+8; Nanchang International Sports Center, Court 1
#	Category	Slovenia	Score (Partition score)	Latvia
1	WD	Anja Blazina (Slovenia); Ariana Korent (Slovenia)	11–7 (11–7)	(Latvia) Madara Mackēviča (Latvia) Anete Priedniece
2	MS	Nikita Peshekhonov (Slovenia)	22–17 (11–10)	(Latvia) Toms Sala
3	WS	Anja Blazina (Slovenia)	33–17 (11–0)	(Latvia) Anete Priedniece
4	MD	Tadej Jelenc (Slovenia); Nikita Peshekhonov (Slovenia)	44–24 (11–7)	(Latvia) Regnārs Bajārs (Latvia) Toms Sala
5	XD	Nikita Peshekhonov (Slovenia); Tinkara Alič (Slovenia)	55–40 (11–16)	(Latvia) Regnārs Bajārs (Latvia) Evelīna Freija
6	WD	Tinkara Alič (Slovenia); Tija Horvat (Slovenia)	66–48 (11–8)	(Latvia) Evelīna Freija (Latvia) Nikola Mukiele
7	MS	Tadej Jelenc (Slovenia)	77–61 (11–13)	(Latvia) Toms Sala
8	WS	Tija Horvat (Slovenia)	88–64 (11–3)	(Latvia) Anete Priedniece
9	MD	Tadej Jelenc (Slovenia); Nikita Peshekhonov (Slovenia)	99–75 (11–11)	(Latvia) Regnārs Bajārs (Latvia) Toms Sala
10	XD	Tadej Jelenc (Slovenia); Ariana Korent (Slovenia)	110–78 (11–3)	(Latvia) Regnārs Bajārs (Latvia) Nikola Mukiele
Result

=== Japan vs England ===
(110) Japan vs England (64); Tuesday, 1 October 2024, 12:30 UTC+8; Nanchang International Sports Center, Court 2
#	Category	Japan	Score (Partition score)	England
1	MS	Kazuma Kawano (Japan)	11–2 (11–2)	(England) Jason Ou
2	WD	Mikoto Aiso (Japan); Rin Ueno (Japan)	22–8 (11–3)	(England) Lila Dundas (England) Matilda Franklin
3	WS	Mion Yokouchi (Japan)	33–13 (11–3)	(England) Rajvi Parab
4	MD	Renjiro Inagawa (Japan); Daichi Miura (Japan)	44–19 (11–4)	(England) Benjamin Horseman (England) Jia Bin Lee
5	XD	Rui Yamada (Japan); Mikoto Aiso (Japan)	55–29 (11–9)	(England) Benjamin Horseman (England) Lucy Brierley
6	MS	Hyuga Takano (Japan)	66–40 (11–11)	(England) Jason Ou
7	WD	Ririna Hiramoto (Japan); Aya Tamaki (Japan)	77–46 (11–6)	(England) Lila Dundas (England) Matilda Franklin
8	WS	Niina Matsuta (Japan)	88–50 (11–4)	(England) Rajvi Parab
9	MD	Kenta Matsukawa (Japan); Yuto Nakashizu (Japan)	99–57 (11–7)	(England) Benjamin Horseman (England) Jia Bin Lee
10	XD	Shuji Sawada (Japan); Aya Tamaki (Japan)	110–64 (11–7)	(England) Benjamin Horseman (England) Lucy Brierley
Result

=== Slovenia vs England ===
(105) Slovenia vs England (110); Wednesday, 2 October 2024, 09:30 UTC+8; Nanchang International Sports Center, Court 3
#	Category	Slovenia	Score (Partition score)	England
1	WD	Anja Blazina (Slovenia); Ariana Korent (Slovenia)	11–8 (11–8)	(England) Lucy Brierley (England) Lila Dundas
2	WS	Anja Blazina (Slovenia)	22–16 (11–8)	(England) Rajvi Parab
3	MD	Tadej Jelenc (Slovenia); Nikita Peshekhonov (Slovenia)	33–24 (11–8)	(England) Benjamin Horseman (England) Jia Bin Lee
4	MS	Nikita Peshekhonov (Slovenia)	37–44 (4–20)	(England) Jason Ou
5	XD	Tadej Jelenc (Slovenia); Ariana Korent (Slovenia)	50–55 (13–11)	(England) Benjamin Horseman (England) Lucy Brierley
6	WD	Anja Blazina (Slovenia); Ariana Korent (Slovenia)	55–66 (5–11)	(England) Lucy Brierley (England) Lila Dundas
7	WS	Anja Blazina (Slovenia)	77–76 (22–10)	(England) Rajvi Parab
8	MD	Tadej Jelenc (Slovenia); Nikita Peshekhonov (Slovenia)	84–88 (7–12)	(England) Benjamin Horseman (England) Jia Bin Lee
9	MS	Tadej Jelenc (Slovenia)	97–99 (13–11)	(England) Jason Ou
10	XD	Nikita Peshekhonov (Slovenia); Tija Horvat (Slovenia)	105–110 (8–11)	(England) Benjamin Horseman (England) Lucy Brierley
Result

=== Uganda vs Latvia ===
(83) Uganda vs Latvia (110); Wednesday, 2 October 2024, 09:30 UTC+8; Nanchang International Sports Center, Court 4
#	Category	Uganda	Score (Partition score)	Latvia
1	WS	Olivia Betty Kyomukama (Uganda)	10–11 (10–11)	(Latvia) Madara Mackēviča
2	MS	Eric Ofoyuru (Uganda)	13–22 (3–11)	(Latvia) Toms Sala
3	MD	Aaron Ndawula (Uganda); Eric Ofoyuru (Uganda)	23–33 (10–11)	(Latvia) Rūdolfs Andersons (Latvia) Regnārs Bajārs
4	XD	Arafat Tendo Kibirige (Uganda); Olivia Betty Kyomukama (Uganda)	28–44 (5–11)	(Latvia) Regnārs Bajārs (Latvia) Anete Priedniece
5	WD	Ramiah Bukenya (Uganda); Nazifa Nakiyemba (Uganda)	35–55 (5–11)	(Latvia) Evelīna Freija (Latvia) Nikola Mukiele
6	WS	Ramiah Bukenya (Uganda)	38–66 (5–11)	(Latvia) Anete Priedniece
7	MS	Arafat Tendo Kibirige (Uganda)	44–77 (6–11)	(Latvia) Toms Sala
8	MD	Arafat Tendo Kibirige (Uganda); Eric Ofoyuru (Uganda)	56–88 (12–11)	(Latvia) Rūdolfs Andersons (Latvia) Regnārs Bajārs
9	XD	Eric Ofoyuru (Uganda); Olivia Betty Kyomukama (Uganda)	61–99 (5–11)	(Latvia) Regnārs Bajārs (Latvia) Evelīna Freija
10	WD	Olivia Betty Kyomukama (Uganda); Nazifa Nakiyemba (Uganda)	83–110 (22–11)	(Latvia) Madara Mackēviča (Latvia) Nikola Mukiele
Result

=== England vs Uganda ===
(110) England vs Uganda (54); Wednesday, 2 October 2024, 15:30 UTC+8; Nanchang International Sports Center, Court 5
#	Category	England	Score (Partition score)	Uganda
1	WD	Lila Dundas (England); Matilda Franklin (England)	11–2 (11–2)	(Uganda) Olivia Betty Kyomukama (Uganda) Nazifa Nakiyemba
2	XD	Benjamin Horseman (England); Lucy Brierley (England)	22–9 (11–4)	(Uganda) Arafat Tendo Kibirige (Uganda) Olivia Betty Kyomukama
3	MD	Benjamin Horseman (England); Jia Bin Lee (England)	33–14 (11–4)	(Uganda) Arafat Tendo Kibirige (Uganda) Eric Ofoyuru
4	WS	Rajvi Parab (England)	44–17 (11–2)	(Uganda) Ramiah Bukenya
5	MS	Jason Ou (England)	55–26 (11–6)	(Uganda) Aaron Ndawula
6	WD	Lila Dundas (England); Matilda Franklin (England)	66–34 (11–8)	(Uganda) Ramiah Bukenya (Uganda) Nazifa Nakiyemba
7	XD	Benjamin Horseman (England); Lucy Brierley (England)	77–37 (11–3)	(Uganda) Eric Ofoyuru (Uganda) Olivia Betty Kyomukama
8	MD	Benjamin Horseman (England); Jia Bin Lee (England)	88–44 (11–7)	(Uganda) Aaron Ndawula (Uganda) Eric Ofoyuru
9	WS	Rajvi Parab (England)	99–49 (11–5)	(Uganda) Olivia Betty Kyomukama
10	MS	Jason Ou (England)	110–54 (11–5)	(Uganda) Arafat Tendo Kibirige
Result

=== Japan vs Slovenia ===
(110) Japan vs Slovenia (47); Wednesday, 2 October 2024, 15:30 UTC+8; Nanchang International Sports Center, Court 6
#	Category	Japan	Score (Partition score)	Slovenia
1	WD	Ririna Hiramoto (Japan); Aya Tamaki (Japan)	11–4 (11–4)	(Slovenia) Anja Blazina (Slovenia) Ariana Korent
2	XD	Kenta Matsukawa (Japan); Ririna Hiramoto (Japan)	22–11 (11–6)	(Slovenia) Nikita Peshekhonov (Slovenia) Tija Horvat
3	WS	Niina Matsuta (Japan)	33–13 (11–2)	(Slovenia) Ariana Korent
4	MS	Toshiki Nishio (Japan)	44–17 (11–2)	(Slovenia) Nikita Peshekhonov
5	MD	Renjiro Inagawa (Japan); Daichi Miura (Japan)	55–24 (11–4)	(Slovenia) Tadej Jelenc (Slovenia) Nikita Peshekhonov
6	WD	Mikoto Aiso (Japan); Rin Ueno (Japan)	66–28 (11–3)	(Slovenia) Tinkara Alič (Slovenia) Tija Horvat
7	XD	Rui Yamada (Japan); Mikoto Aiso (Japan)	77–35 (11–5)	(Slovenia) Tadej Jelenc (Slovenia) Ariana Korent
8	WS	Mion Yokouchi (Japan)	88–40 (11–5)	(Slovenia) Anja Blazina
9	MS	Kazuma Kawano (Japan)	99–45 (11–5)	(Slovenia) Tadej Jelenc
10	MD	Kenta Matsukawa (Japan); Yuto Nakashizu (Japan)	110–47 (11–2)	(Slovenia) Tadej Jelenc (Slovenia) Nikita Peshekhonov
Result

== Group H ==
Pos	Team	Pld	W	L	MF	MA	MD	GF	GA	GD	PF	PA	PD	Pts	Qualification
1	United States [9/16]	4	4	0	440	369	+71	32	8	+24	2343	2054	+289	4	Qualified to knockout stage 1st to 8th
2	Thailand [2]	4	3	1	437	360	+77	32	8	+24	2371	1927	+444	3	Qualified to knockout stage 9th to 16th place
3	Vietnam [17/40]	4	2	2	402	372	+30	16	24	−8	2114	2081	+33	2	Qualified to knockout stage 17th to 24th place
4	Philippines [17/40]	4	1	3	389	408	−19	20	20	0	2216	2133	+83	1	Qualified to knockout stage 25th to 32nd place
5	Portugal [17/40]	4	0	4	281	440	−159	0	40	−40	1571	2420	−849	0	Qualified to knockout stage 33rd to 40th place

Source: TS

=== United States vs Vietnam ===
(110) United States vs Vietnam (85); Monday, 30 September 2024, 12:00 UTC+8; Nanchang International Sports Center, Court 7
#	Category	United States	Score (Partition score)	Vietnam
1	WS	Nicole Krawczyk (United States)	11–9 (11–9)	(Vietnam) Bùi Bích Phương
2	MD	Weslie Chen (United States); Kyle Wang (United States)	22–19 (11–10)	(Vietnam) Nguyễn Văn Mai (Vietnam) Phạm Văn Trường
3	MS	Garret Tan (United States)	33–23 (11–4)	(Vietnam) Trần Quốc Khánh
4	XD	Kai Chong (United States); Stella Pan (United States)	44–34 (11–11)	(Vietnam) Phạm Văn Trường (Vietnam) Bùi Bích Phương
5	WD	Ella Lin (United States); Veronica Yang (United States)	55–46 (11–12)	(Vietnam) Nguyễn Thị Thu Huyền (Vietnam) Nguyễn Vũ Ngọc Trân
6	WS	Ella Lin (United States)	66–50 (11–4)	(Vietnam) Trần Thị Anh
7	MD	Kai Chong (United States); Kyle Wang (United States)	77–62 (11–12)	(Vietnam) Lê Minh Sơn (Vietnam) Trần Quốc Khánh
8	MS	Anderson Lin (United States)	88–70 (11–8)	(Vietnam) Nguyễn Văn Mai
9	XD	Weslie Chen (United States); Stella Pan (United States)	99–78 (11–8)	(Vietnam) Lê Minh Sơn (Vietnam) Nguyễn Vũ Ngọc Trân
10	WD	Chloe Ho (United States); Veronica Yang (United States)	110–85 (11–7)	(Vietnam) Bùi Bích Phương (Vietnam) Trần Thị Anh
Result

=== Thailand vs Philippines ===
(110) Thailand vs Philippines (78); Monday, 30 September 2024, 12:00 UTC+8; Nanchang International Sports Center, Court 8
#	Category	Thailand	Score (Partition score)	Philippines
1	MD	Sittisak Nadee (Thailand); Chayapat Piboon (Thailand)	11–10 (11–10)	(Philippines) Christian Dorega (Philippines) John Vincent Lanuza
2	WS	Sarunrak Vitidsarn (Thailand)	22–12 (11–2)	(Philippines) Christel Rei Fuentespina
3	MS	Patcharakit Apiratchataset (Thailand)	33–25 (11–13)	(Philippines) Jamal Rahmat Pandi
4	XD	Tankhun Setthaprasert (Thailand); Pitchanard Chaiwanna (Thailand)	44–40 (11–15)	(Philippines) Jamal Rahmat Pandi (Philippines) Mary Destiny Untal
5	WD	Kodchaporn Chaichana (Thailand); Pannawee Polyiam (Thailand)	55–50 (11–10)	(Philippines) Andrea Princess Hernandez (Philippines) Mary Destiny Untal
6	MD	Eakanath Kitkawinroj (Thailand); Tankhun Setthaprasert (Thailand)	66–54 (11–4)	(Philippines) John Vincent Lanuza (Philippines) Zeth Quiambao
7	WS	Yataweemin Ketklieng (Thailand)	77–55 (11–1)	(Philippines) Althea Dawn Campao
8	MS	Patcharakit Apiratchataset (Thailand)	88–58 (11–3)	(Philippines) Jamal Rahmat Pandi
9	XD	Pannawat Jamtubtim (Thailand); Naphachanok Utsanon (Thailand)	99–65 (11–7)	(Philippines) Jamal Rahmat Pandi (Philippines) Mary Destiny Untal
10	WD	Yataweemin Ketklieng (Thailand); Passa-Orn Phannachet (Thailand)	110–78 (11–13)	(Philippines) Andrea Princess Hernandez (Philippines) Mary Destiny Untal
Result

=== Philippines vs Portugal ===
(110) Philippines vs Portugal (78); Monday, 30 September 2024, 18:00 UTC+8; Nanchang International Sports Center, Court 1
#	Category	Philippines	Score (Partition score)	Portugal
1	WS	Christel Rei Fuentespina (Philippines)	11–4 (11–4)	(Portugal) Maria Wilkinson
2	WD	Andrea Princess Hernandez (Philippines); Mary Destiny Untal (Philippines)	22–10 (11–6)	(Portugal) Isabella Wilkinson (Portugal) Maria Wilkinson
3	MS	Zeth Quiambao (Philippines)	33–17 (11–7)	(Portugal) Santiago Batalha
4	XD	Jamal Rahmat Pandi (Philippines); Mary Destiny Untal (Philippines)	44–28 (11–11)	(Portugal) Dinis Maia (Portugal) Erica Glória
5	MD	Christian Dorega (Philippines); John Vincent Lanuza (Philippines)	55–37 (11–9)	(Portugal) Tiago Berenguer (Portugal) Alexandre Bernardo
6	WS	Althea Dawn Ocampao (Philippines)	66–51 (11–14)	(Portugal) Mafaldo Avelino
7	WD	Andrea Princess Hernandez (Philippines); Mary Destiny Untal (Philippines)	77–59 (11–8)	(Portugal) Mafaldo Avelino (Portugal) Erica Glória
8	MS	Jamal Rahmat Pandi (Philippines)	88–68 (11–9)	(Portugal) Tiago Berenguer
9	XD	Jamal Rahmat Pandi (Philippines); Mary Destiny Untal (Philippines)	99–71 (11–3)	(Portugal) Alexandre Bernardo (Portugal) Isabella Wilkinson
10	MD	Jamal Rahmat Pandi (Philippines); Zeth Quiambao (Philippines)	110–78 (11–7)	(Portugal) Santiago Batalha (Portugal) Dinis Maia
Result

=== Thailand vs Vietnam ===
(110) Thailand vs Vietnam (97); Monday, 30 September 2024, 18:00 UTC+8; Nanchang International Sports Center, Court 2
#	Category	Thailand	Score (Partition score)	Vietnam
1	WS	Sarunrak Vitidsarn (Thailand)	11–3 (11–3)	(Vietnam) Trần Thị Anh
2	MD	Eakanath Kitkawinroj (Thailand); Tankhun Setthaprasert (Thailand)	22–18 (11–13)	(Vietnam) Nguyễn Văn Mai (Vietnam) Phạm Văn Trường
3	MS	Patcharakit Apiratchataset (Thailand)	33–20 (11–2)	(Vietnam) Lê Minh Sơn
4	XD	Pannawat Jamtubtim (Thailand); Naphachanok Utsanon (Thailand)	44–36 (11–16)	(Vietnam) Nguyễn Văn Mai (Vietnam) Nguyễn Thị Thu Huyền
5	WD	Kodchaporn Chaichana (Thailand); Pannawee Polyiam (Thailand)	55–42 (11–6)	(Vietnam) Bùi Bích Phương (Vietnam) Nguyễn Vũ Ngọc Trân
6	WS	Yataweemin Ketklieng (Thailand)	66–43 (11–1)	(Vietnam) Nguyễn Thị Thu Huyền
7	MD	Sittisak Nadee (Thailand); Chayapat Piboon (Thailand)	77–53 (11–10)	(Vietnam) Lê Minh Sơn (Vietnam) Trần Quốc Khánh
8	MS	Patcharakit Apiratchataset (Thailand)	88–66 (11–13)	(Vietnam) Trần Quốc Khánh
9	XD	Pannawat Jamtubtim (Thailand); Naphachanok Utsanon (Thailand)	99–83 (11–17)	(Vietnam) Phạm Văn Trường (Vietnam) Bùi Bích Phương
10	WD	Yataweemin Ketklieng (Thailand); Passa-Orn Phannachet (Thailand)	110–97 (11–14)	(Vietnam) Bùi Bích Phương (Vietnam) Trần Thị Anh
Result

=== United States vs Philippines ===
(110) United States vs Philippines (108); Tuesday, 1 October 2024, 12:30 UTC+8; Nanchang International Sports Center, Court 3
#	Category	United States	Score (Partition score)	Philippines
1	MS	Garret Tan (United States)	11–10 (11–10)	(Philippines) Jamal Rahmat Pandi
2	MD	Weslie Chen (United States); Kyle Wang (United States)	22–20 (11–10)	(Philippines) John Vincent Lanuza (Philippines) Zeth Quiambao
3	XD	Kai Chong (United States); Stella Pan (United States)	27–33 (5–13)	(Philippines) Jamal Rahmat Pandi (Philippines) Mary Destiny Untal
4	WS	Nicole Krawczyk (United States)	36–44 (9–11)	(Philippines) Christel Rei Fuentespina
5	WD	Ella Lin (United States); Veronica Yang (United States)	44–55 (8–11)	(Philippines) Andrea Princess Hernandez (Philippines) Mary Destiny Untal
6	MS	Anderson Lin (United States)	51–66 (7–11)	(Philippines) Jamal Rahmat Pandi
7	MD	Kai Chong (United States); Kyle Wang (United States)	62–77 (11–11)	(Philippines) John Vincent Lanuza (Philippines) Zeth Quiambao
8	XD	Weslie Chen (United States); Stella Pan (United States)	71–88 (9–11)	(Philippines) Jamal Rahmat Pandi (Philippines) Mary Destiny Untal
9	WS	Ella Lin (United States)	99–98 (28–10)	(Philippines) Christel Rei Fuentespina
10	WD	Chloe Ho (United States); Veronica Yang (United States)	110–108 (11–10)	(Philippines) Andrea Princess Hernandez (Philippines) Mary Destiny Untal
Result

=== Thailand vs Portugal ===
(110) Thailand vs Portugal (75); Tuesday, 1 October 2024, 12:30 UTC+8; Nanchang International Sports Center, Court 4
#	Category	Thailand	Score (Partition score)	Portugal
1	WS	Sarunrak Vitidsarn (Thailand)	11–6 (11–6)	(Portugal) Maria Wilkinson
2	MD	Sittisak Nadee (Thailand); Chayapat Piboon (Thailand)	22–15 (11–9)	(Portugal) Tiago Berenguer (Portugal) Alexandre Bernardo
3	XD	Tankhun Setthaprasert (Thailand); Pitchanard Chaiwanna (Thailand)	33–21 (11–6)	(Portugal) Dinis Maia (Portugal) Erica Glória
4	WD	Kodchaporn Chaichana (Thailand); Pannawee Polyiam (Thailand)	44–30 (11–9)	(Portugal) Isabella Wilkinson (Portugal) Maria Wilkinson
5	MS	Eakanath Kitkawinroj (Thailand)	55–39 (11–9)	(Portugal) Alexandre Bernardo
6	WS	Passa-Orn Phannachet (Thailand)	66–48 (11–9)	(Portugal) Mafaldo Avelino
7	MD	Atiruch Oonwattananukool (Thailand); Tankhun Setthaprasert (Thailand)	77–52 (11–4)	(Portugal) Santiago Batalha (Portugal) Dinis Maia
8	XD	Pannawat Jamtubtim (Thailand); Naphachanok Utsanon (Thailand)	88–64 (11–12)	(Portugal) Santiago Batalha (Portugal) Isabella Wilkinson
9	WD	Yataweemin Ketklieng (Thailand); Passa-Orn Phannachet (Thailand)	99–69 (11–5)	(Portugal) Mafaldo Avelino (Portugal) Erica Glória
10	MS	Patcharakit Apiratchataset (Thailand)	110–75 (11–6)	(Portugal) Tiago Berenguer
Result

=== Vietnam vs Philippines ===
(110) Vietnam vs Philippines (93); Wednesday, 2 October 2024, 9:30 UTC+8; Nanchang International Sports Center, Court 6
#	Category	Vietnam	Score (Partition score)	Philippines
1	WD	Bùi Bích Phương (Vietnam); Trần Thị Anh (Vietnam)	7–11 (7–11)	(Philippines) Andrea Princess Hernandez (Philippines) Mary Destiny Untal
2	XD	Phạm Văn Trường (Vietnam); Bùi Bích Phương (Vietnam)	14–22 (7–11)	(Philippines) Jamal Rahmat Pandi (Philippines) Mary Destiny Untal
3	MS	Trần Quốc Khánh (Vietnam)	22–33 (8–11)	(Philippines) Jamal Rahmat Pandi
4	WS	Bùi Bích Phương (Vietnam)	34–44 (12–11)	(Philippines) Christel Rei Fuentespina
5	MD	Nguyễn Văn Mai (Vietnam); Phạm Văn Trường (Vietnam)	55–54 (11–11)	(Philippines) Jamal Rahmat Pandi (Philippines) Zeth Quiambao
6	WD	Bùi Bích Phương (Vietnam); Trần Thị Anh (Vietnam)	66–65 (11–11)	(Philippines) Andrea Princess Hernandez (Philippines) Mary Destiny Untal
7	XD	Lê Minh Sơn (Vietnam); Nguyễn Vũ Ngọc Trân (Vietnam)	77–73 (11–8)	(Philippines) Jamal Rahmat Pandi (Philippines) Mary Destiny Untal
8	MS	Nguyễn Văn Mai (Vietnam)	88–82 (11–9)	(Philippines) Zeth Quiambao
9	WS	Nguyễn Thị Thu Huyền (Vietnam)	99–88 (11–6)	(Philippines) Althea Dawn Campao
10	MD	Nguyễn Văn Mai (Vietnam); Phạm Văn Trường (Vietnam)	110–93 (11–5)	(Philippines) Christian Dorega (Philippines) John Vincent Lanuza
Result

=== United States vs Portugal ===
(110) United States vs Portugal (69); Wednesday, 2 October 2024, 9:30 UTC+8; Nanchang International Sports Center, Court 5
#	Category	United States	Score (Partition score)	Portugal
1	WS	Nicole Krawczyk (United States)	11–7 (11–7)	(Portugal) Maria Wilkinson
2	MS	Anderson Lin (United States)	22–20 (11-13)	(Portugal) Santiago Batalha
3	WD	Chloe Ho (United States); Stella Pan (United States)	33–26 (11–6)	(Portugal) Erica Glória (Portugal) Maria Wilkinson
4	MD	Kai Chong (United States); Garret Tan (United States)	44–35 (11–9)	(Portugal) Santiago Batalha (Portugal) Dinis Maia
5	XD	Weslie Chen (United States); Chloe Ho (United States)	55–42 (11–7)	(Portugal) Dinis Maia (Portugal) Erica Glória
6	WS	Veronica Yang (United States)	66–48 (11–6)	(Portugal) Mafaldo Avelino
7	MS	Garret Tan (United States)	77–53 (11–5)	(Portugal) Tiago Berenguer
8	WD	Ella Lin (United States); Veronica Yang (United States)	88–60 (11–7)	(Portugal) Mafaldo Avelino (Portugal) Isabella Wilkinson
9	MD	Weslie Chen (United States); Kyle Wang (United States)	99–63 (11–3)	(Portugal) Tiago Berenguer (Portugal) Alexandre Bernardo
10	XD	Kai Chong (United States); Stella Pan (United States)	110–69 (11–6)	(Portugal) Dinis Maia (Portugal) Erica Glória
Result

=== Vietnam vs Portugal ===
(110) Vietnam vs Portugal (59); Wednesday, 2 October 2024, 15:30 UTC+8; Nanchang International Sports Center, Court 8
#	Category	Vietnam	Score (Partition score)	Portugal
1	WS	Bùi Bích Phương (Vietnam)	11–3 (11–3)	(Portugal) Maria Wilkinson
2	MS	Trần Quốc Khánh (Vietnam)	22–10 (11–7)	(Portugal) Tiago Berenguer
3	WD	Bùi Bích Phương (Vietnam); Trần Thị Anh (Vietnam)	33–15 (11–5)	(Portugal) Mafaldo Avelino (Portugal) Isabella Wilkinson
4	MD	Nguyễn Văn Mai (Vietnam); Phạm Văn Trường (Vietnam)	44–19 (11–4)	(Portugal) Santiago Batalha (Portugal) Dinis Maia
5	XD	Lê Minh Sơn (Vietnam); Nguyễn Vũ Ngọc Trân (Vietnam)	55–23 (11–4)	(Portugal) Dinis Maia (Portugal) Erica Glória
6	WS	Nguyễn Thị Thu Huyền (Vietnam)	66–32 (11–9)	(Portugal) Santiago Batalha
7	MS	Nguyễn Văn Mai (Vietnam)	77–43 (11–11)	(Portugal) Santiago Batalha
8	WD	Bùi Bích Phương (Vietnam); Trần Thị Anh (Vietnam)	88–49 (11–6)	(Portugal) Erica Glória (Portugal) Maria Wilkinson
9	MD	Nguyễn Văn Mai (Vietnam); Phạm Văn Trường (Vietnam)	99–53 (11–4)	(Portugal) Tiago Berenguer (Portugal) Alexandre Bernardo
10	XD	Phạm Văn Trường (Vietnam); Bùi Bích Phương (Vietnam)	110–59 (11–6)	(Portugal) Alexandre Bernardo (Portugal) Isabella Wilkinson
Result

=== United States vs Thailand ===
(110) United States vs Thailand (107); Wednesday, 2 October 2024, 15:30 UTC+8; Nanchang International Sports Center, Court 7
#	Category	United States	Score (Partition score)	Thailand
1	XD	Kai Chong (United States); Stella Pan (United States)	11–6 (11–6)	(Thailand) Tankhun Setthaprasert (Thailand) Pitchanard Chaiwanna
2	MS	Garret Tan (United States)	22–12 (11-6)	(Thailand) Patcharakit Apiratchataset
3	WD	Chloe Ho (United States); Veronica Yang (United States)	33–27 (11–15)	(Thailand) Kodchaporn Chaichana (Thailand) Pannawee Polyiam
4	WS	Ella Lin (United States)	44–37 (11–10)	(Thailand) Sarunrak Vitidsarn
5	MD	Weslie Chen (United States); Kyle Wang (United States)	55–46 (11–9)	(Thailand) Eakanath Kitkawinroj (Thailand) Tankhun Setthaprasert
6	XD	Weslie Chen (United States); Ella Lin (United States)	66–62 (11–6)	(Thailand) Pannawat Jamtubtim (Thailand) Pannawee Polyiam
7	MS	Garret Tan (United States)	75–77 (9–15)	(Thailand) Patcharakit Apiratchataset
8	WD	Chloe Ho (United States); Veronica Yang (United States)	85–88 (10–11)	(Thailand) Passa-Orn Phannachet (Thailand) Naphachanok Utsanon
9	WS	Ella Lin (United States)	99–94 (14–6)	(Thailand) Yataweemin Ketklieng
10	MD	Weslie Chen (United States); Kyle Wang (United States)	110–107 (11–13)	(Thailand) Sittisak Nadee (Thailand) Chayapat Piboon
Result
